= 2020 WNBL Finals =

Team	Coach	Wins
Southside Flyers	Cheryl Chambers	1
Townsville Fire	Shannon Seebohm	0
- Dates: 16 – 20 December 2020
- MVP: Leilani Mitchell (STH)
- Preliminary final: Townsville def. Melbourne, 65–62

The 2020 WNBL Finals was the postseason tournament of the WNBL's 2020 season. The Canberra Capitals were the two-time defending champions, but were defeated in the semi-finals by Melbourne. The Southside Flyers won the Grand Final, defeating the Townsville Fire, 99–82. The Flyers took home the franchise's fourth WNBL title overall, this being their first since rebranding as Southside.

Due to the COVID-19 pandemic, a condensed season was held in a North Queensland hub. The season was originally 2020–21 and would be traditionally played over several months across the summer, however this season's scheduling has been amended. The six-week season saw Townsville, Cairns and Mackay host a 52-game regular season fixture, plus a four game Finals series (2 x semi-finals, preliminary final and grand final). The WNBL Finals series schedule and ticketing details were announced 5 December 2020.

== Standings ==
#	WNBL Championship ladder				
#	Team	W	L	PCT	GP
1	Southside Flyers	11	2	84.6	13
2	Townsville Fire	9	4	69.2	13
3	Canberra Capitals	9	4	69.2	13
4	Melbourne Boomers	9	4	69.2	13
5	Sydney Uni Flames	5	8	38.5	13
6	Adelaide Lightning	5	8	38.5	13
7	Perth Lynx	4	9	30.8	13
8	Bendigo Spirit	0	13	0.0	13

== Bracket ==
Semifinals
Southside Flyers	106
Townsville Fire	93
Canberra Capitals	68
Melbourne Boomers	78

Preliminary final
Townsville Fire	65
Melbourne Boomers	62

Grand final
Southside Flyers	99
Townsville Fire	82

== Semi-finals ==
=== (1) Southside Flyers vs. (2) Townsville Fire ===
16 December 2020
7:00 PM (AEST)

Box Score

Southside Flyers	106–93	Townsville Fire
Scoring by quarter: 41–25, 19–27, 26–22, 20–19
Pts: Cambage 31; Rebs: Cambage 18; Asts: Mitchell 10		Pts: Heal, Nicholson 30; Rebs: Aokuso, Nicholson 6 Asts: Heal 7

Townsville Stadium, Townsville, Queensland
Attendance: 1,235
Referees: Byron Geddes, James Griguol, Jack Taylor

=== (3) Canberra Capitals vs. (4) Melbourne Boomers ===
16 December 2020
5:00 PM (AEST)

Box Score

Canberra Capitals	68–78	Melbourne Boomers
Scoring by quarter: 20–32, 15–9, 17–22, 16–15
Pts: Smart 15; Rebs: Griffin 11; Asts: Rocci 7		Pts: Magbegor 20; Rebs: George 12; Asts: Madgen 6

Townsville Stadium, Townsville, Queensland
Referees: Daniel Battye, Jacqui Dover, Calia Hanks

== Preliminary Final ==
=== (2) Townsville Fire vs. (4) Melbourne Boomers ===
18 December 2020
6:00 PM (AEST)

Box Score

Townsville Fire	65–62	Melbourne Boomers
Scoring by quarter: 22–17, 11–12, 21–18, 11–15
Pts: Heal 28; Rebs: McKay, Nicholson 8 Asts: Payne 4		Pts: Magbegor 19; Rebs: George 10; Asts: Madgen 6

Townsville Stadium, Townsville, Queensland
Attendance: 849
Referees: Daniel Battye, Madi Crowley-Long, Guy Richards

== Grand Final ==
=== (1) Southside Flyers vs. (2) Townsville Fire ===
20 December 2020
2:00 PM (AEST)

Box Score

Southside Flyers	99–82	Townsville Fire
Scoring by quarter: 22–22, 26–24, 23–15, 28–21
Pts: Mitchell 31; Rebs: Cambage 8 Asts: Mitchell 5		Pts: Nicholson 20; Rebs: Heal, McKay, Nicholson 7 Asts: Nicholson 4

Townsville Stadium, Townsville, Queensland
Attendance: 1,825
Referees: Daniel Battye, James Griguol, Jack Taylor

=== Rosters ===
2020 Southside Flyers roster
Players
Coaches

Pos.	No.	Nat.	Name	Ht.
G	1	(Australia)	Cole, Rebecca	1.78 m (5 ft 10 in)
G	3	(Australia)	Clydesdale, Aimie	1.78 m (5 ft 10 in)
G/F	4	(Australia)	O'Hea, Jenna (C)	1.87 m (6 ft 2 in)
G	5	(Australia)	Mitchell, Leilani	1.65 m (5 ft 5 in)
G	6	(Australia)	Taylor, Saraid	1.83 m (6 ft 0 in)
G	7	(Australia)	Blicavs, Stephanie	1.78 m (5 ft 10 in)
C	8	(Australia)	Cambage, Liz	2.03 m (6 ft 8 in)
F	9	(Australia)	Pizzey, Rebecca	1.90 m (6 ft 3 in)
F	12	(Australia)	Jarry, Rachel	1.85 m (6 ft 1 in)
G	14	(Australia)	Conti, Monique	1.65 m (5 ft 5 in)
F	15	(Australia)	Blicavs, Sara	1.89 m (6 ft 2 in)
G	20	(Australia)	Giliam, Taylah	1.70 m (5 ft 7 in)

Head coach

- (Australia) Cheryl Chambers

Assistant coach(es)

- (Australia) Belinda Snell

Legend

- (C) Team captain
- (DP) Development player
- (I) Import player
- Injured

- Roster
Updated: 20 December 2020

2020 Townsville Fire roster
Players
Coaches

Pos.	No.	Nat.	Name	Ht.
G	1	(Australia)	Nicholson, Lauren	1.80 m (5 ft 11 in)
G	3	(Australia)	Reid, Stephanie	1.68 m (5 ft 6 in)
G	4	(Australia)	Heal, Shyla	1.67 m (5 ft 6 in)
G/F	7	(Australia)	Woods, Courtney	1.83 m (6 ft 0 in)
G	9	(Australia)	McDermott, Kelsey	1.78 m (5 ft 10 in)
G	10	(Australia)	Murray, Mia	1.85 m (6 ft 1 in)
G	11	(Australia)	Gaze, Kate	1.78 m (5 ft 10 in)
F	12	(Australia)	Payne, Nadeen	1.88 m (6 ft 2 in)
F	14	(Australia)	McSpadden, Lara	1.94 m (6 ft 4 in)
C	15	(Australia)	Aokuso, Zitina	1.94 m (6 ft 4 in)
G	23	(Australia)	Fabbro, Aliza	1.72 m (5 ft 8 in)
F/C	25	(Australia)	McKay, Megan	1.92 m (6 ft 4 in)

Head coach

- (Australia) Shannon Seebohm

Assistant coach(es)

- (Australia) Luke Brennan

Legend

- (C) Team captain
- (DP) Development player
- (I) Import player
- Injured

- Roster
Updated: 20 December 2020
