= 2020 Townsville Fire season =

2020–21 Townsville Fire season
- Head Coach: Shannon Seebohm
- Venue: Townsville Stadium

Results
- Record: 9–4
- Ladder: 2nd
- Finals: Grand Final (defeated by Southside, 82–99)

Leaders
- Points: Nicholson (18.9)
- Rebounds: Payne (6.3)
- Assists: Heal (3.4)

The 2020 Townsville Fire season was the 20th season for the franchise in the Women's National Basketball League (WNBL).

James Cook University remain as the Fire's naming rights partner after signing a three-year extension in September 2019. The Fire announced a different leadership team for this season, with Kate Gaze, Mia Murray, Lauren Nicholson & Nadeen Payne acting as a leadership group rather than a captaincy.

Due to the COVID-19 pandemic, a North Queensland hub is set to host the season. The season was originally 2020–21 and would be traditionally played over several months across the summer, however this seasons scheduling has been condensed. The six-week season will see Townsville, Cairns and Mackay host a 56-game regular season fixture, plus a four game final series (2 x semi-finals, preliminary final and grand final).

== Roster ==
2020 Townsville Fire roster
Players
Coaches

Pos.	No.	Nat.	Name	Ht.
G	1	(Australia)	Nicholson, Lauren	1.80 m (5 ft 11 in)
G	3	(Australia)	Reid, Stephanie	1.68 m (5 ft 6 in)
G	4	(Australia)	Heal, Shyla	1.67 m (5 ft 6 in)
G/F	7	(Australia)	Woods, Courtney	1.83 m (6 ft 0 in)
G	10	(Australia)	Murray, Mia	1.85 m (6 ft 1 in)
G	11	(Australia)	Gaze, Kate	1.78 m (5 ft 10 in)
F	12	(Australia)	Payne, Nadeen	1.88 m (6 ft 2 in)
F	14	(Australia)	McSpadden, Lara	1.94 m (6 ft 4 in)
C	15	(Australia)	Aokuso, Zitina	1.94 m (6 ft 4 in)
G	23	(Australia)	Fabbro, Aliza	1.72 m (5 ft 8 in)
F/C	25	(Australia)	McKay, Megan	1.92 m (6 ft 4 in)

Head coach

- (Australia) Shannon Seebohm

Legend

- (C) Team captain
- (DP) Development player
- (I) Import player
- Injured

- Roster
Updated: 16 October 2020

== Standings ==
#	WNBL Championship ladder				
#	Team	W	L	PCT	GP
1	Southside Flyers	11	2	84.6	13
2	Townsville Fire	9	4	69.2	13
3	Canberra Capitals	9	4	69.2	13
4	Melbourne Boomers	9	4	69.2	13
5	Sydney Uni Flames	5	8	38.5	13
6	Adelaide Lightning	5	8	38.5	13
7	Perth Lynx	4	9	30.8	13
8	Bendigo Spirit	0	13	0.0	13

== Results ==
=== Regular season ===
Game	Date	Team	Score	High points	High rebounds	High assists	Location	Record
1	November; 11	Perth	73–48	Nicholson (16)	Payne (12)	Reid (3)	Mackay Multisports Stadium	1–0
2	November; 15	Canberra	67–78	Nicholson (19)	McSpadden (6)	Heal (4)	Mackay Multisports Stadium	1–1
3	November; 17	Sydney	81–78	Nicholson (17)	Aokuso, McKay (7)	Heal (6)	Townsville Stadium	2–1
4	November; 19	Southside	89–101	Nicholson (21)	Aokuso (8)	Heal (4)	Townsville Stadium	2–2
5	November; 21	Bendigo	91–81	Heal (22)	McKay (14)	McKay (5)	Townsville Stadium	3–2
6	November; 22	Melbourne	87–75	Nicholson (24)	Payne (6)	Nicholson (6)	Townsville Stadium	4–2
7	November; 24	Bendigo	99–51	McKay, Payne (18)	McKay, Payne (8)	Reid (8)	Townsville Stadium	5–2
8	November; 28	Southside	70–94	Heal (17)	Payne (6)	Heal, Murray, Woods (3)	Cairns Pop-Up Arena	5–3
9	November; 29	Sydney	73–59	Aokuso (16)	Aokuso (10)	Heal (6)	Cairns Pop-Up Arena	6–3
10	December; 4	Perth	75–84	Nicholson (28)	Payne (12)	Gaze (5)	Townsville Stadium	6–4
11	December; 6	Canberra	84–71	Heal (27)	Heal, Payne (8)	Heal (3)	Townsville Stadium	7–4
12	December; 11	Adelaide	95–66	Nicholson (21)	Heal, McKay, Payne (7)	Payne (5)	Cairns Pop-Up Arena	8–4
13	December; 13	Melbourne	70–64	Nicholson (23)	Aokuso, Payne (7)	Gaze (5)	Townsville Stadium	9–4

=== Finals ===
Game	Date	Team	Score	High points	High rebounds	High assists	Location	Record
SF	December; 16	Southside	93–106	Heal, Nicholson (30)	Aokuso (6)	Heal (7)	Townsville Stadium	0–1
PF	December; 18	Melbourne	65–62	Heal (28)	McKay, Nicholson (8)	Payne (4)	Townsville Stadium	1–1
GF	December; 20	Southside	82–99	Nicholson (20)	Heal, McKay, Nicholson (7)	Nicholson (4)	Townsville Stadium	1–2
