= 2020 Canberra Capitals season =

2020–21 Canberra Capitals season
- Head Coach: Paul Goriss
- Captain: Kelsey Griffin; Marianna Tolo (co)
- Venue: National Convention Centre

Results
- Record: 9–4
- Ladder: 3rd
- Finals: Semi-Finals (defeated by Melbourne)

Leaders
- Points: Rocci (16.0)
- Rebounds: Griffin (8.1)
- Assists: Tupaea (4.2)

The 2020 Canberra Capitals season is the 37th season for the franchise in the Women's National Basketball League (WNBL).

University of Canberra remain as the owners and naming rights partner of the Capitals for the seventh consecutive season.

Due to the COVID-19 pandemic, a North Queensland hub is set to host the season. The season was originally 2020–21 and would be traditionally played over several months across the summer, however this season's scheduling has been condensed. The six-week season will see Townsville, Cairns and Mackay host a 56-game regular season fixture, plus a four-game final series (2 x semi-finals, preliminary final and grand final). Each team will contest 14 games starting on 12 November, with the grand final scheduled for 20 December.

== Roster ==
2020 Canberra Capitals roster
Players
Coaches

Pos.	No.	Nat.	Name	Ht.
F	1	(Australia)	Taia, Ashley	1.83 m (6 ft 0 in)
G	2	(United States)	Smart, Brittany	1.70 m (5 ft 7 in)
F/C	3	(United States)	Ruef, Mikaela	1.91 m (6 ft 3 in)
G	4	(Australia)	Tupaea, Tahlia	1.75 m (5 ft 9 in)
G	5	(Australia)	Melbourne, Jade	1.76 m (5 ft 9 in)
G/F	7	(Australia)	Kaser, Hannah	1.78 m (5 ft 10 in)
G	8	(Australia)	Cubillo, Abby	1.61 m (5 ft 3 in)
G	9	(Australia)	Rocci, Maddison	1.68 m (5 ft 6 in)
C	12	(Australia)	Tolo, Marianna (C)	1.96 m (6 ft 5 in)
F	14	(Australia)	Delaney, Alex	1.83 m (6 ft 0 in)
F	21	(Australia)	Froling, Keely	1.88 m (6 ft 2 in)
F	23	(Australia)	Griffin, Kelsey (C)	1.88 m (6 ft 2 in)

Head coach

- (Australia) Paul Goriss

Assistant coach(es)

- (Australia) Kristen Veal
- (Australia) Carly Wilson

Legend

- (C) Team captain
- (DP) Development player
- (I) Import player
- Injured

- Roster
Updated: 8 November 2020

== Standings ==
#	WNBL Championship ladder				
#	Team	W	L	PCT	GP
1	Southside Flyers	11	2	84.6	13
2	Townsville Fire	9	4	69.2	13
3	Canberra Capitals	9	4	69.2	13
4	Melbourne Boomers	9	4	69.2	13
5	Sydney Uni Flames	5	8	38.5	13
6	Adelaide Lightning	5	8	38.5	13
7	Perth Lynx	4	9	30.8	13
8	Bendigo Spirit	0	13	0.0	13

== Results ==
=== Regular season ===
Game	Date	Team	Score	High points	High rebounds	High assists	Location	Record
1	November; 11	Adelaide	73–85 (OT)	Rocci (21)	Delaney (9)	Rocci (7)	Mackay Multisports Stadium	0–1
2	November; 15	Townsville	78–67	Rocci (24)	Ruef (13)	Rocci (7)	Mackay Multisports Stadium	1–1
3	November; 16	Bendigo	76–56	Melbourne (14)	Ruef (11)	Cubillo, Tolo (4)	Mackay Multisports Stadium	2–1
4	November; 18	Melbourne	67–50	Melbourne (20)	Tolo (7)	Tupaea (4)	Mackay Multisports Stadium	3–1
5	November; 21	Sydney	68–63	Rocci (17)	Froling (10)	Tupaea (5)	Cairns Pop-Up Arena	4–1
6	November; 23	Southside	95–72	Tolo (19)	Griffin (9)	Melbourne (6)	Cairns Pop-Up Arena	5–1
7	November; 26	Perth	73–70	Griffin (21)	Griffin (12)	Tupaea (7)	Cairns Pop-Up Arena	6–1
8	November; 28	Bendigo	87–51	Tolo (14)	Griffin, Ruef (9)	Tupaea (6)	Townsville Stadium	7–1
9	December; 1	Melbourne	67–73	Griffin (16)	Tolo (12)	Tupaea (4)	Townsville Stadium	7–2
10	December; 4	Adelaide	85–65	Rocci (18)	Griffin (9)	Tupaea (5)	Townsville Stadium	8–2
11	December; 6	Townsville	71–84	Rocci (19)	Ruef (12)	Smart (4)	Townsville Stadium	8–3
12	December; 10	Perth	96–69	Rocci (27)	Griffin (9)	Cubillo (7)	Townsville Stadium	9–3
13	December; 13	Southside	82–101	Tolo (23)	Ruef (12)	Rocci (5)	Townsville Stadium	9–4

=== Finals ===
Game	Date	Team	Score	High points	High rebounds	High assists	Location	Record
SF	December; 16	Melbourne	68–78	Smart (15)	Griffin (11)	Rocci (7)	Townsville Stadium	0–1
