= 2020 Melbourne Boomers season =

2020–21 Melbourne Boomers season
- Head Coach: Guy Molloy
- Captain: Madeleine Garrick; Cayla George (co)
- Venue: State Basketball Centre

Results
- Record: 9–4
- Ladder: 4th
- Finals: Preliminary Final (defeated by Townsville)

Leaders
- Points: Magbegor (15.4)
- Rebounds: George (9.5)
- Assists: Madgen (6.2)

The 2020 Melbourne Boomers season is the 38th season for the franchise in the Women's National Basketball League (WNBL).

Due to the COVID-19 pandemic, a North Queensland hub is set to host the season. The season was originally 2020–21 and would be traditionally played over several months across the summer, however this seasons scheduling has been condensed. The six-week season will see Townsville, Cairns and Mackay host a 56-game regular season fixture, plus a four-game final series (2 x semi-finals, preliminary final and grand final). Each team will contest 14 games starting on 12 November, with the grand final scheduled for 20 December.

== Roster ==
2020 Melbourne Boomers roster
Players
Coaches

Pos.	No.	Nat.	Name	Ht.
G	4	(Australia)	Antoniadou, Rachel	1.75 m (5 ft 9 in)
G	6	(Australia)	Brewster, Rachel	1.80 m (5 ft 11 in)
G	7	(New Zealand)	Farnworth, Antonia	1.81 m (5 ft 11 in)
G	9	(Australia)	Madgen, Tess	1.80 m (5 ft 11 in)
G	10	(Australia)	Wright, Izzy	1.80 m (5 ft 11 in)
F	11	(New Zealand)	Davidson, Penina	1.90 m (6 ft 3 in)
F	13	(Australia)	Magbegor, Ezi	1.93 m (6 ft 4 in)
G	21	(New Zealand)	Beck, Stella	1.83 m (6 ft 0 in)
F/C	22	(Australia)	George, Cayla (C)	1.92 m (6 ft 4 in)
G	23	(Australia)	Garrick, Madeleine (C)	1.78 m (5 ft 10 in)
F	32	(New Zealand)	Purcell, Kalani	1.87 m (6 ft 2 in)
F	47	(New Zealand)	Karaitiana, Ashleigh	1.83 m (6 ft 0 in)

Head coach

- (Australia) Guy Molloy

Assistant coach(es)

- (Australia) Larissa Anderson
- (Australia) Paul Flynn

Legend

- (C) Team captain
- (DP) Development player
- (I) Import player
- Injured

- Roster
Updated: 8 November 2020

== Standings ==
#	WNBL Championship ladder				
#	Team	W	L	PCT	GP
1	Southside Flyers	11	2	84.6	13
2	Townsville Fire	9	4	69.2	13
3	Canberra Capitals	9	4	69.2	13
4	Melbourne Boomers	9	4	69.2	13
5	Sydney Uni Flames	5	8	38.5	13
6	Adelaide Lightning	5	8	38.5	13
7	Perth Lynx	4	9	30.8	13
8	Bendigo Spirit	0	13	0.0	13

== Results ==
=== Regular season ===
Game	Date	Team	Score	High points	High rebounds	High assists	Location	Record
1	November; 12	Sydney	85–70	Madgen (23)	Magbegor (11)	Madgen (5)	Townsville Stadium	1–0
2	November; 14	Southside	89–72	George, Madgen (24)	Madgen (9)	Madgen (5)	Townsville Stadium	2–0
3	November; 16	Perth	62–56	George (25)	Magbegor (8)	Garrick (4)	Mackay Multisports Stadium	3–0
4	November; 18	Canberra	50–67	George (10)	George (6)	Karaitiana (3)	Mackay Multisports Stadium	3–1
5	November; 22	Townsville	75–87	Magbegor (20)	George (13)	Madgen (7)	Townsville Stadium	3–2
6	November; 24	Adelaide	91–51	George, Madgen (16)	George (15)	George, Madgen (6)	Townsville Stadium	4–2
7	December; 1	Canberra	73–67	Garrick (19)	Magbegor (13)	Madgen (8)	Townsville Stadium	5–2
8	December; 3	Sydney	86–64	Magbegor (23)	Magbegor (11)	Madgen (9)	Cairns Pop-Up Arena	6–2
9	December; 5	Bendigo	84–52	Davidson, George (15)	Magbegor (10)	Madgen (6)	Cairns Pop-Up Arena	7–2
10	December; 6	Southside	79–94	Magbegor (20)	George (10)	George (7)	Cairns Pop-Up Arena	7–3
11	December; 8	Adelaide	76–55	George (22)	George (11)	Beck, George, Purcell, Wright (4)	Cairns Pop-Up Arena	8–3
12	December; 11	Bendigo	91–70	Beck (17)	Magbegor (8)	Garrick (8)	Cairns Pop-Up Arena	9–3
13	December; 13	Townsville	64–70	Magbegor (20)	George (17)	Madgen (8)	Townsville Stadium	9–4

=== Finals ===
Game	Date	Team	Score	High points	High rebounds	High assists	Location	Record
SF	December; 16	Canberra	78–68	Magbegor (20)	George (12)	Madgen (6)	Townsville Stadium	1–0
PF	December; 18	Townsville	62–65	Magbegor (19)	George (10)	Madgen (6)	Townsville Stadium	1–1
