= Tahlia Tupaea =

Australian basketball player

Personal information
- Born: 1 June 1997 (age 29) Penrith, New South Wales, Australia
- Listed height: 174 cm (5 ft 9 in)

Career information
- WNBA draft: 2017: 3rd round, 36th overall pick
- Drafted by: Minnesota Lynx
- Playing career: 2012–present
- Position: Guard

Career history
- 2012–2020: Sydney Uni Flames
- 2013; 2015: Penrith Panthers
- 2016: BA Centre of Excellence
- 2017–2018: Sydney Uni Sparks
- 2019: USC Rip City
- 2020–2022: Canberra Capitals
- 2021: Bankstown Bruins
- 2022–2025: Northern Kāhu
- 2023–2024: Penrith Panthers
- 2024–2025: Sydney Flames
- 2025: Inner West Bulls
- 2025: Canberra Capitals
- 2026: Bankstown Bruins

Career highlights
- WNBL champion (2017); NBL1 East champion (2026); TBA champion (2023); TBA MVP (2022); TBA All-Star Five (2022); Waratah League MVP (2021); Waratah League All-Star Five (2021)
- Stats at Basketball Reference
Medals
Representing Australia
Basketball
FIBA U19 World Championship
Bronze medal – third place	2013 Lithuania	Team
Bronze medal – third place	2015 Russia	Team
FIBA Oceania Junior Championships
Gold medal – first place	2013 Melbourne	U17 Team
Gold medal – first place	2014 Suva	U19 Team

Tahlia Tupaea (born 1 June 1997) is an Australian-New Zealand professional basketball player.

== Early life ==
Tupaea was born in Penrith, New South Wales.

== Professional career ==
=== WNBL ===
Tupaea became the second youngest debutant in WNBL history in October 2012 at age 15 and 133 days. She played eight seasons for the Sydney Uni Flames between 2012 and 2020.

Tupaea played for the Canberra Capitals during the 2020 WNBL hub season in Queensland and then re-joined the team for the 2021–22 WNBL season. After sitting out the 2022–23 WNBL season, Tupaea was set to re-join the Capitals for the 2023–24 WNBL season, but she did not end up playing. She played for the Sydney Flames during the 2024–25 WNBL season. In December 2025, she had a one-game stint with the Canberra Capitals.

=== WNBA ===
In April 2017, Tupaea was drafted by the Minnesota Lynx with the 36th and final pick of the 2017 WNBA draft.

=== Australian State Leagues and New Zealand ===
In 2013 and 2015, Tupaea played in the Waratah League for the Penrith Panthers. In 2016, she played for the BA Centre of Excellence in the SEABL. She continued in the SEABL in 2017 and 2018 with the Sydney Uni Sparks before joining the USC Rip City in the QBL in 2019. In 2021, she returned to the Waratah League to play for the Bankstown Bruins, winning league MVP.

In 2022, Tupaea joined the Northern Kāhu for the inaugural season of New Zealand's Tauihi Basketball Aotearoa (TBA), where she won league MVP.

Tupaea started the 2023 NBL1 season with the Penrith Panthers of the NBL1 East before re-joining the Northern Kāhu for the 2023 TBA season. She sustained a shoulder injury early in the season, as the Kāhu went on to win the 2023 TBA championship. She played for the Panthers again in the 2024 NBL1 season and the Northern Kāhu in the 2024 TBA season. She played for the Inner West Bulls in the 2025 NBL1 season and again for the Northern Kāhu in the 2025 TBA season. With the Bankstown Bruins in the 2026 NBL1 season, she helped the team win the NBL1 East championship. At the 2026 NBL1 National Finals, the Bruins reached the championship game, where they were defeated 86–73 by the Knox Raiders.

== National team career ==
Tupaea represented Australia at the 2013 FIBA Oceania U16 Championship, 2013 FIBA U19 World Championship, 2014 FIBA Oceania U18 Championship, 2014 FIBA U17 World Championship, and 2015 FIBA U19 World Championship.

== Personal life ==
Tupaea is a dual citizen of Australia and New Zealand.
