= 2020 Southside Flyers season =

2020–21 Southside Flyers season
- Head Coach: Cheryl Chambers
- Captain: Jenna O'Hea
- Venue: Dandenong Stadium

Results
- Record: 11–2
- Ladder: 1st
- Finals: WNBL Champions (defeated Townsville, 99–82)

Leaders
- Points: Cambage (23.5)
- Rebounds: Cambage (8.7)
- Assists: Mitchell (6.7)

The 2020 Southside Flyers season is the 29th season for the franchise in the Women's National Basketball League (WNBL). With a grand final win over the Townsville Fire, the Flyers took home their fourth championship title. This win marked their first title since rebranding.

Due to the COVID-19 pandemic, a North Queensland hub is set to host the season. The season was originally 2020–21 and would be traditionally played over several months across the summer, however this seasons scheduling has been condensed. The six-week season will see Townsville, Cairns and Mackay host a 52-game regular season fixture, plus a four game final series (2 x semi-finals, preliminary final and grand final).

== Roster ==
2020 Southside Flyers roster
Players
Coaches

Pos.	No.	Nat.	Name	Ht.
G	1	(Australia)	Cole, Rebecca	1.78 m (5 ft 10 in)
G	3	(Australia)	Clydesdale, Aimie	1.78 m (5 ft 10 in)
G/F	4	(Australia)	O'Hea, Jenna (C)	1.87 m (6 ft 2 in)
G	5	(Australia)	Mitchell, Leilani	1.65 m (5 ft 5 in)
F	6	(Australia)	Taylor, Saraid	1.72 m (5 ft 8 in)
G	7	(Australia)	Blicavs, Stephanie	1.78 m (5 ft 10 in)
C	8	(Australia)	Cambage, Liz	2.03 m (6 ft 8 in)
F	9	(Australia)	Pizzey, Rebecca	1.90 m (6 ft 3 in)
G	11	(Australia)	O'Neill, Amy	1.68 m (5 ft 6 in)
F	12	(Australia)	Jarry, Rachel	1.85 m (6 ft 1 in)
G	14	(Australia)	Conti, Monique	1.65 m (5 ft 5 in)
F	15	(Australia)	Blicavs, Sara	1.89 m (6 ft 2 in)
G	20	(Australia)	Giliam, Taylah	1.70 m (5 ft 7 in)

Head coach

- (Australia) Cheryl Chambers

Assistant coach(es)

- (Australia) Belinda Snell

Legend

- (C) Team captain
- (DP) Development player
- (I) Import player
- Injured

- Roster
Updated: 8 November 2020

== Standings ==
#	WNBL Championship ladder				
#	Team	W	L	PCT	GP
1	Southside Flyers	11	2	84.6	13
2	Townsville Fire	9	4	69.2	13
3	Canberra Capitals	9	4	69.2	13
4	Melbourne Boomers	9	4	69.2	13
5	Sydney Uni Flames	5	8	38.5	13
6	Adelaide Lightning	5	8	38.5	13
7	Perth Lynx	4	9	30.8	13
8	Bendigo Spirit	0	13	0.0	13

== Results ==
=== Regular season ===
Game	Date	Team	Score	High points	High rebounds	High assists	Location	Record
1	November; 12	Bendigo	102–60	Cambage (19)	Sa Blicavs (12)	St Blicavs (5)	Townsville Stadium	1–0
2	November; 14	Melbourne	72–89	Cambage (24)	Cambage (19)	Mitchell (7)	Townsville Stadium	1–1
3	November; 15	Sydney	99–72	Cole (27)	Sa Blicavs (9)	Mitchell, O'Hea (8)	Townsville Stadium	2–1
4	November; 19	Townsville	101–89	Cambage (31)	Cambage (13)	Mitchell (8)	Townsville Stadium	3–1
5	November; 21	Perth	117–71	Cambage (21)	Cambage (7)	Cole (5)	Cairns Pop-Up Arena	4–1
6	November; 23	Canberra	72–95	Cambage (26)	Sa Blicavs (7)	Cole (6)	Cairns Pop-Up Arena	4–2
7	November; 25	Perth	102–62	Cambage (23)	Cambage (8)	Cole, O'Hea (5)	Cairns Pop-Up Arena	5–2
8	November; 28	Townsville	94–70	Cambage (26)	Cambage (9)	Mitchell (9)	Cairns Pop-Up Arena	6–2
9	November; 29	Adelaide	110–79	Cambage (25)	Sa Blicavs (9)	Mitchell (10)	Cairns Pop-Up Arena	7–2
10	December; 2	Adelaide	111–72	Cambage (29)	Sa Blicavs (10)	Mitchell (7)	Cairns Pop-Up Arena	8–2
11	December; 6	Melbourne	94–79	Cambage (35)	Sa Blicavs, Cambage (7)	Mitchell (11)	Cairns Pop-Up Arena	9–2
12	December; 10	Sydney	81–77	Cambage (24)	Sa Blicavs (8)	Clydesdale, Cole, Mitchell (5)	Townsville Stadium	10–2
13	December; 13	Canberra	101–82	Cole (23)	Cambage (12)	Mitchell (9)	Townsville Stadium	11–2

=== Finals ===
Game	Date	Team	Score	High points	High rebounds	High assists	Location
Semi Final	December; 16	Townsville	106–93	Cambage (31)	Cambage (18)	Mitchell (10)	Townsville Stadium
Grand Final	December; 20	Townsville	99–82	Mitchell (31)	Cambage (8)	Mitchell (5)	Townsville Stadium
