= WNBL Sixth Woman of the Year Award =

The WNBL Sixth Woman of the Year Award is an annual Women's National Basketball League (WNBL) award given since the 2019–20 WNBL season to the most outstanding player coming off the bench.

== Winners ==
	Denotes player whose team won championship that year
	Denotes player inducted into the Australian Basketball Hall of Fame
	Denotes player who is still active
Player (X)	Denotes the number of times the player had won at that time
Team (X)	Denotes the number of times a player from this team had won at that time

Season	Player	Position	Nationality	Team
2019–20	Alison Schwagmeyer	Guard	United States	Perth Lynx
2020	Zitina Aokuso	Forward/center	Australia	Townsville Fire
2021–22	Kristy Wallace	Guard	Australia	Southside Flyers
2022–23	Isobel Borlase	Guard	Australia	Adelaide Lightning
2023–24	Leilani Mitchell	Guard	Australia	Southside Flyers (2)
2024–25	Abigail Wehrung	Guard	Australia	Bendigo Spirit
2025–26	Lucy Olsen	Guard	United States	Townsville Fire (2)

== See also ==
- All-WNBL Team
- WNBL Most Valuable Player Award
- Australia women's national basketball team
