= 2020 Adelaide Lightning season =

2020–21 Adelaide Lightning season
- Head Coach: Chris Lucas
- Captain: Stephanie Talbot
- Venue: Titanium Security Arena

Results
- Record: 5–8
- Ladder: 6th
- Finals: Did not qualify

Leaders
- Points: Talbot (18.2)
- Rebounds: Talbot (9.0)
- Assists: Wilson (4.3)

The 2020 Adelaide Lightning season is the 29th season for the franchise in the Women's National Basketball League (WNBL).

Due to the COVID-19 pandemic, a North Queensland hub is set to host the season. The season was originally 2020–21 and would be traditionally played over several months across the summer, however this seasons scheduling has been condensed. The six-week season will see Townsville, Cairns and Mackay host a 56-game regular season fixture, plus a four-game final series (2 x semi-finals, preliminary final and grand final). Each team will contest 14 games starting on 12 November, with the grand final scheduled for 20 December.

== Roster ==
2020 Adelaide Lightning roster
Players
Coaches

Pos.	No.	Nat.	Name	Ht.
C	2	(Australia)	Tomlinson, Louella	1.93 m (6 ft 4 in)
G	3	(Australia)	Basham, Brooke
G	4	(Australia)	Wilson, Alex	1.80 m (5 ft 11 in)
G	6	(Australia)	Smith, Carlie	1.85 m (6 ft 1 in)
G/F	7	(Australia)	Talbot, Stephanie (C)	1.88 m (6 ft 2 in)
F/C	8	(Australia)	Brook, Chelsea	1.88 m (6 ft 2 in)
G	9	(Australia)	Brett, Aimee	1.73 m (5 ft 8 in)
G	10	(Australia)	Ortlepp, Taylor	1.78 m (5 ft 10 in)
G	12	(Australia)	Yaeger, Morgan	1.75 m (5 ft 9 in)
G	13	(Australia)	Wehrung, Abigail	1.78 m (5 ft 10 in)
F/C	20	(Australia)	Batish, Ella	1.88 m (6 ft 2 in)
G/F	21	(Australia)	Whittle, Marena	1.80 m (5 ft 11 in)

Head coach

- (Australia) Chris Lucas

Assistant coach(es)

- (Australia) Natalie Hurst

Legend

- (C) Team captain
- (DP) Development player
- (I) Import player
- Injured

- Roster
Updated: 8 November 2020

== Standings ==
#	WNBL Championship ladder				
#	Team	W	L	PCT	GP
1	Southside Flyers	11	2	84.6	13
2	Townsville Fire	9	4	69.2	13
3	Canberra Capitals	9	4	69.2	13
4	Melbourne Boomers	9	4	69.2	13
5	Sydney Uni Flames	5	8	38.5	13
6	Adelaide Lightning	5	8	38.5	13
7	Perth Lynx	4	9	30.8	13
8	Bendigo Spirit	0	13	0.0	13

== Results ==
=== Regular season ===
Game	Date	Team	Score	High points	High rebounds	High assists	Location	Record
1	November; 11	Canberra	85–73 (OT)	Talbot (31)	Talbot (13)	Wilson (6)	Mackay Multisports Stadium	1–0
2	November; 15	Perth	74–69	Talbot (24)	Whittle (12)	Wilson (5)	Mackay Multisports Stadium	2–0
3	November; 24	Melbourne	51–91	Wilson (13)	Talbot (7)	Batish (3)	Townsville Stadium	2–1
4	November; 25	Bendigo	89–83	Wilson (23)	Talbot (12)	Talbot (5)	Townsville Stadium	3–1
5	November; 28	Sydney	75–53	Talbot (30)	Talbot (12)	Wilson (10)	Cairns Pop-Up Arena	4–1
6	November; 29	Southside	79–110	Wehrung (21)	Whittle (9)	Talbot (7)	Cairns Pop-Up Arena	4–2
7	December; 2	Southside	72–111	Wilson (13)	Wilson (9)	Wilson (4)	Cairns Pop-Up Arena	4–3
8	December; 4	Canberra	65–85	Talbot (21)	Talbot (8)	Wilson (4)	Townsville Stadium	4–4
9	December; 6	Perth	78–80	Talbot (23)	Talbot (13)	Talbot, Wehrung (7)	Townsville Stadium	4–5
10	December; 8	Melbourne	55–76	Wilson (14)	Talbot (6)	Tomlinson (3)	Cairns Pop-Up Arena	4–6
11	December; 9	Bendigo	69–59	Talbot (15)	Talbot (6)	Wehrung, Wilson, Tomlinson (3)	Cairns Pop-Up Arena	5–6
12	December; 11	Townsville	66–95	Wehrung (15)	Smith, Talbot, Tomlinson, Whittle (5)	Wehrung (4)	Cairns Pop-Up Arena	5–7
13	December; 13	Sydney	60–86	Talbot (22)	Talbot (13)	Wilson (7)	Townsville Stadium	5–8
