= 2020 Sydney Uni Flames season =

2020–21 Sydney Uni Flames season
- Head Coach: Katrina Hibbert
- Captain: Lauren Mansfield; Alison Schwagmeyer (co)
- Venue: Brydens Stadium

Results
- Record: 5–8
- Ladder: 5th
- Finals: Did not qualify

Leaders
- Points: Mansfield (14.0)
- Rebounds: Maley (12.1)
- Assists: Mansfield (4.5)

The 2020 Sydney Uni Flames season is the 41st season for the franchise in the Women's National Basketball League (WNBL).

Brydens Lawyers remain as the Flames' naming rights sponsor for the eighth consecutive season.

Due to the COVID-19 pandemic, a North Queensland hub is set to host the season. The season was originally 2020–21 and would be traditionally played over several months across the summer, however this seasons scheduling has been condensed. The six-week season will see Townsville, Cairns and Mackay host a 56-game regular season fixture, plus a four game final series (2 x semi-finals, preliminary final and grand final). Each team will contest 14 games starting on 12 November, with the grand final scheduled for 20 December.

== Roster ==
2020 Sydney Uni Flames roster
Players
Coaches

Pos.	No.	Nat.	Name	Ht.
G	3	(Turkey)	Nakkaşoğlu, Funda	1.73 m (5 ft 8 in)
G	7	(Australia)	Calleia, Sherrie
F	8	(Australia)	Rowe, Kiera	1.80 m (5 ft 11 in)
C	9	(Australia)	Burton, Natalie	1.94 m (6 ft 4 in)
F	10	(Australia)	Greaves, Shanae	1.85 m (6 ft 1 in)
C	11	(Australia)	Scherf, Lauren	1.96 m (6 ft 5 in)
F	12	(Australia)	Boag, Christina	1.88 m (6 ft 2 in)
G	22	(Australia)	O'Hehir, Madeleine	1.79 m (5 ft 10 in)
F	24	(Australia)	Maley, Anneli	1.88 m (6 ft 2 in)
G/F	32	(United States)	Schwagmeyer, Alison (C)	1.77 m (5 ft 10 in)
G	33	(Australia)	Mansfield, Lauren (C)	1.70 m (5 ft 7 in)
F	40	(Australia)	Boag, Carly	1.88 m (6 ft 2 in)

Head coach

- (Australia) Katrina Hibbert

Assistant coach(es)

- (United States) Courtney Belger

Legend

- (C) Team captain
- (DP) Development player
- (I) Import player
- Injured

- Roster
Updated: 18 November 2020

== Standings ==
#	WNBL Championship ladder				
#	Team	W	L	PCT	GP
1	Southside Flyers	11	2	84.6	13
2	Townsville Fire	9	4	69.2	13
3	Canberra Capitals	9	4	69.2	13
4	Melbourne Boomers	9	4	69.2	13
5	Sydney Uni Flames	5	8	38.5	13
6	Adelaide Lightning	5	8	38.5	13
7	Perth Lynx	4	9	30.8	13
8	Bendigo Spirit	0	13	0.0	13

== Results ==
=== Regular season ===
Game	Date	Team	Score	High points	High rebounds	High assists	Location	Record
1	November; 12	Melbourne	70–85	Mansfield (17)	Scherf (7)	Mansfield (6)	Townsville Stadium	0–1
2	November; 14	Bendigo	100–63	Mansfield (24)	Burton (8)	Mansfield (5)	Townsville Stadium	1–1
3	November; 15	Southside	72–99	Burton (12)	Maley (12)	Mansfield (8)	Townsville Stadium	1–2
4	November; 17	Townsville	78–81	Scherf (25)	Maley (14)	Mansfield (5)	Townsville Stadium	1–3
5	November; 21	Canberra	63–68	Scherf (19)	Maley (12)	Scherf (4)	Cairns Pop-Up Arena	1–4
6	November; 23	Perth	74–67	Nakkaşoğlu (27)	Maley (20)	Mansfield, Schwagmeyer (4)	Cairns Pop-Up Arena	2–4
7	November; 28	Adelaide	53–75	Burton (14)	Maley, Schwagmeyer (8)	Mansfield (4)	Cairns Pop-Up Arena	2–5
8	November; 29	Townsville	59–73	Scherf (18)	Scherf (19)	Schwagmeyer (5)	Cairns Pop-Up Arena	2–6
9	December; 3	Melbourne	64–86	Mansfield (22)	Maley (11)	Mansfield (3)	Cairns Pop-Up Arena	2–7
10	December; 6	Bendigo	62–54	Ch Boag (16)	Maley (10)	Mansfield (7)	Cairns Pop-Up Arena	3–7
11	December; 8	Perth	71–68	Scherf, Schwagmeyer (19)	Maley (14)	Scherf (5)	Townsville Stadium	4–7
12	December; 10	Southside	77–81	Mansfield (21)	Maley (17)	Mansfield (4)	Townsville Stadium	4–8
13	December; 13	Adelaide	86–60	Mansfield (31)	Maley (15)	Mansfield (4)	Townsville Stadium	5–8
