= 2020 Perth Lynx season =

2020–21 Perth Lynx season
- Head Coach: Ryan Petrik
- Captain: Katie Ebzery
- Venue: WA Basketball Centre

Results
- Record: 4–9
- Ladder: 7th
- Finals: Did not qualify

Leaders
- Points: Ebzery (18.0)
- Rebounds: Sharp (8.0)
- Assists: Ebzery (3.8)

The 2020 Perth Lynx season is the 35th season for the franchise in the Women's National Basketball League (WNBL).

The 2020 season will mark the first season with Ryan Petrik as head coach, after he overtook the role from Andy Stewart who spent five seasons in the position. In November 2020, the Lynx announced that local mining and development company, Westgold Resources Limited, would serve as naming rights partners for the upcoming season.

Due to the COVID-19 pandemic, a North Queensland hub is set to host the season. The season was originally 2020–21 and would be traditionally played over several months across the summer, however this seasons scheduling has been condensed. The six-week season will see Townsville, Cairns and Mackay host a 56-game regular season fixture, plus a four-game final series (2 x semi-finals, preliminary final and grand final). Each team will contest 14 games starting on 12 November, with the grand final scheduled for 20 December.

== Roster ==
2020 Perth Lynx roster
Players
Coaches

Pos.	No.	Nat.	Name	Ht.
F	3	(Australia)	Williams, Nes'eya	1.86 m (6 ft 1 in)
F/C	5	(Australia)	Garbin, Darcee	1.88 m (6 ft 2 in)
G	6	(Australia)	Williams, Jewel	1.68 m (5 ft 6 in)
G/F	8	(Australia)	Ciabattoni, Alex	1.83 m (6 ft 0 in)
G	9	(Australia)	Sharp, Alexandra	1.85 m (6 ft 1 in)
G	10	(Australia)	Ebzery, Katie (C)	1.78 m (5 ft 10 in)
C	12	(Australia)	Edwards, Jessie	1.93 m (6 ft 4 in)
G	15	(Australia)	Burrows, Tayah	1.79 m (5 ft 10 in)
F/C	20	(Australia)	Isenbarger, Ashleigh	1.87 m (6 ft 2 in)
F	33	(United States)	Steindl, Kayla	1.87 m (6 ft 2 in)
F/C	35	(Australia)	Clinch Hoycard, Mackenzie	1.90 m (6 ft 3 in)
F	38	(Australia)	Clarke, Emma	1.85 m (6 ft 1 in)

Head coach

- (Australia) Ryan Petrik

Assistant coach(es)

- (Australia) Keegan Crawford

Legend

- (C) Team captain
- (DP) Development player
- (I) Import player
- Injured

- Roster
Updated: 8 November 2020

== Standings ==
#	WNBL Championship ladder				
#	Team	W	L	PCT	GP
1	Southside Flyers	11	2	84.6	13
2	Townsville Fire	9	4	69.2	13
3	Canberra Capitals	9	4	69.2	13
4	Melbourne Boomers	9	4	69.2	13
5	Sydney Uni Flames	5	8	38.5	13
6	Adelaide Lightning	5	8	38.5	13
7	Perth Lynx	4	9	30.8	13
8	Bendigo Spirit	0	13	0.0	13

== Results ==
=== Regular season ===
Game	Date	Team	Score	High points	High rebounds	High assists	Location	Record
1	November; 11	Townsville	48–73	Garbin (12)	Sharp (11)	Burrows, Garbin, Sharp (2)	Mackay Multisports Stadium	0–1
2	November; 15	Adelaide	69–74	Ebzery (25)	Sharp (9)	Burrows, Garbin (3)	Mackay Multisports Stadium	0–2
3	November; 16	Melbourne	56–62	Sharp (15)	Sharp (12)	Clarke (3)	Mackay Multisports Stadium	0–3
4	November; 18	Bendigo	78–65	Ebzery (24)	Steindl (12)	Ciabattoni (4)	Mackay Multisports Stadium	1–3
5	November; 21	Southside	71–117	Garbin (24)	Garbin (7)	Ebzery (5)	Cairns Pop-Up Arena	1–4
6	November; 23	Sydney	67–74	Garbin (22)	Steindl (12)	Ebzery (5)	Cairns Pop-Up Arena	1–5
7	November; 25	Southside	62–102	Sharp (17)	Edwards (7)	Ebzery (4)	Cairns Pop-Up Arena	1–6
8	November; 26	Canberra	70–73	Ebzery (17)	Garbin (11)	Ebzery (5)	Cairns Pop-Up Arena	1–7
9	December; 1	Bendigo	95–79	Garbin (28)	Sharp (17)	Ciabattoni, Sharp (6)	Townsville Stadium	2–7
10	December; 4	Townsville	84–75	Ebzery, Garbin (21)	Garbin (11)	Ebzery (4)	Townsville Stadium	3–7
11	December; 6	Adelaide	80–78	Garbin (31)	Garbin, Steindl (11)	Ebzery (10)	Townsville Stadium	4–7
12	December; 8	Sydney	68–71	Ebzery (24)	Sharp (12)	Garbin (4)	Townsville Stadium	4–8
13	December; 10	Canberra	69–96	Ebzery (24)	Sharp (8)	Ciabattoni (5)	Townsville Stadium	4–9
