= 2023–24 WNBL season =

- League: Women's National Basketball League
- Sport: Basketball
- Duration: 1 November 2023 – 13 March 2024
- Teams: 8
- TV partner(s): ESPN; 9Now

Regular season
- Top seed: Townsville Fire
- Season MVP: Jordin Canada (MEL)
- Top scorer: Aari McDonald (PER)

Finals
- Champions: Southside Flyers
- Runners-up: Perth Lynx
- Finals MVP: Mercedes Russell (STH)

WNBL seasons
- ← 2022–23 2024–25 →

The 2023–24 WNBL season is the 44th season of the competition since its establishment in 1981. The Townsville Fire were the defending champions, but were defeated in the Semi-Finals by Perth. The Southside Flyers won their fifth championship title after defeating Perth, 2–1 in the Grand Final series.

Cygnett remains as the WNBL's naming rights partner for this season, after signing a three-year deal in September 2022. Spalding again provided equipment including the official game ball, alongside iAthletic supplying team apparel for the seventh consecutive season.

In July 2023, the season structure was confirmed to feature an 84-game regular season and best-of-three Semi-Final & Grand Final series' to follow. All games were again confirmed to be broadcast via 9Now and ESPN, for the second consecutive season.

== Ladder ==
#	2023–24 WNBL Championship ladder				
#	Team	W	L	PCT	GP
1	Townsville Fire	14	7	66.6	21
2	Southside Flyers	13	8	61.9	21
3	Melbourne Boomers	12	9	57.1	21
4	Perth Lynx	11	10	52.3	21
5	Sydney Flames	11	10	52.3	21
6	Bendigo Spirit	11	10	52.3	21
7	Adelaide Lightning	8	13	38.0	21
8	Canberra Capitals	4	17	19.0	21

== Regular season ==
=== Round 1 ===
1 November 2023	Adelaide Lightning	60–68	Melbourne Boomers	Adelaide Arena, Adelaide
6:30 PM (ACDT)	Scoring by quarter: 24–13, 11–13, 13–25, 12–17
ESPN	Pts: Willoughby 14; Rebs: Turner 15; Asts: Turner 8	Box Score	Pts: Hillmon 14; Rebs: Three players 10; Asts: Canada 8	Attendance: 614

3 November 2023	Perth Lynx	85–71	Sydney Flames	Bendat Basketball Centre, Perth
6:30 PM (AWST)	Scoring by quarter: 20–13, 18–16, 18–18, 29–24
9Now	Pts: McDonald 18; Rebs: Maley 21; Asts: McDonald 6	Box Score	Pts: Nicholson 17; Rebs: George 8 Asts: George 5	Attendance: 1,011

4 November 2023	Bendigo Spirit	80–93	Townsville Fire	Red Energy Arena, Bendigo
5:00 PM (AEDT)	Scoring by quarter: 22–25, 18–21, 21–27, 19–20
9Now	Pts: Kraker 16; Rebs: A Wilson 6 Asts: Wehrung, K Wilson 5	Box Score	Pts: Aokuso 20; Rebs: Kunek 6 Asts: Reid 5	Attendance: 588

4 November 2023	Southside Flyers	70–77	Melbourne Boomers	State Basketball Centre, Melbourne
7:30 PM (AEDT)	Scoring by quarter: 18–16, 8–24, 21–16, 23–21
9Now	Pts: Cole 25; Rebs: Russell 9 Asts: Rocci 7	Box Score	Pts: Reed 18; Rebs: Froling, Hillmon 11; Asts: Canada 10	Attendance: 3,198

5 November 2023	Canberra Capitals	79–82	Adelaide Lightning	National Convention Centre Canberra, Canberra
5:30 PM (AEDT)	Scoring by quarter: 20–31, 23–27, 16–12, 20–12
9Now	Pts: Sharp 21; Rebs: Sharp 19; Asts: Melbourne 11	Box Score	Pts: Borlase, Bourne 20; Rebs: Turner 15; Asts: Mansfield 5	Attendance: 1,702

=== Round 2 ===
8 November 2023	Canberra Capitals	79–104	Southside Flyers	National Convention Centre Canberra, Canberra
7:00 PM (AEDT)	Scoring by quarter: 20–27, 20–22, 15–28, 24–27
ESPN	Pts: Sharp 14; Rebs: Bunton 10; Asts: Melbourne 6	Box Score	Pts: Rocci 28; Rebs: Russell 11; Asts: Rocci 7	Attendance: 1,498

10 November 2023	Bendigo Spirit	62–68	Sydney Flames	Mildura Sporting Precinct, Mildura
7:30 PM (AEDT)	Scoring by quarter: 12–12, 8–23, 23–13, 19–20
9Now	Pts: Kraker 14; Rebs: Davis, Kraker 7 Asts: Kraker, A Wilson 4	Box Score	Pts: Nicholson 16; Rebs: Richards 12; Asts: Bradley 4	Attendance: 780

11 November 2023	Townsville Fire	74–75	Southside Flyers	Townsville Entertainment Centre, Townsville
6:30 PM (AEST)	Scoring by quarter: 29–24, 19–22, 15–9, 11–20
9Now	Pts: Reid 18; Rebs: Whitcomb 11; Asts: Reid 7	Box Score	Pts: Russell 22; Rebs: Russell 6 Asts: Rocci 6	Attendance: 2,907

11 November 2023	Perth Lynx	92–85	Adelaide Lightning	Bendat Basketball Centre, Perth
6:30 PM (AWST)	Scoring by quarter: 17–27, 25–17, 24–28, 26–13
9Now	Pts: McDonald 29; Rebs: Maley 13; Asts: McDonald 11	Box Score	Pts: Borlase 20; Rebs: Turner 23; Asts: Mansfield, Turner 5	Attendance: 842

12 November 2023	Sydney Flames	80–95	Melbourne Boomers	Qudos Bank Arena, Sydney
1:30 PM (AEDT)	Scoring by quarter: 23–25, 21–23, 13–23, 23–24
9Now	Pts: Richards 16; Rebs: George 7 Asts: Bradley, George 5	Box Score	Pts: Canada 20; Rebs: Reed 8 Asts: Canada 13	Attendance: 2,589

=== Round 3 ===
15 November 2023	Sydney Flames	86–81	Canberra Capitals	Quaycentre, Sydney
7:00PM (AEDT)	Scoring by quarter: 29–26, 23–19, 16–15, 18–21
ESPN	Pts: Nicholson 25; Rebs: Richards 10; Asts: George 5	Box Score	Pts: Melbourne 31; Rebs: Sharp 13; Asts: Melbourne 7	Attendance: 1,258

17 November 2023	Perth Lynx	86–76	Bendigo Spirit	Bendat Basketball Centre, Perth
6:30 PM (AWST)	Scoring by quarter: 24–20, 22–22, 21–14, 19–20
9Now	Pts: McDonald 34; Rebs: Maley 14; Asts: Goodchild 5	Box Score	Pts: Froling 18; Rebs: Froling 11; Asts: K Wilson 6	Attendance: 656

18 November 2023	Adelaide Lightning	67–56	Southside Flyers	Adelaide Arena, Adelaide
6:00 PM (ACDT)	Scoring by quarter: 14–15, 25–11, 8–9, 20–21
9Now	Pts: Borlase 25; Rebs: Turner 16; Asts: Four players 3	Box Score	Pts: Russell 14; Rebs: Russell 17; Asts: Rocci 5	Attendance: 1,325

18 November 2023	Townsville Fire	85–73	Canberra Capitals	Townsville Entertainment Centre, Townsville
7:30 PM (AEST)	Scoring by quarter: 20–16, 21–17, 24–21, 20–19
9Now	Pts: Kunek 27; Rebs: Aokuso 10; Asts: Whitcomb 7	Box Score	Pts: Three players 14; Rebs: Sharp 7 Asts: Melbourne 15	Attendance: 2,488

19 November 2023	Melbourne Boomers	76–74	Bendigo Spirit	Parkville Stadium, Melbourne
3:00 PM (AEDT)	Scoring by quarter: 16–30, 11–11, 23–21, 26–12
9Now	Pts: Canada 26; Rebs: Canada 8 Asts: Canada 7	Box Score	Pts: Griffin 33; Rebs: Froling 10; Asts: A Wilson 7	Attendance: 2,896

=== Round 4 ===
22 November 2023	Southside Flyers	94–92	Perth Lynx	State Basketball Centre, Melbourne
7:00 PM (AEDT)	Scoring by quarter: 17–32, 17–22, 30–17, 30–21
ESPN	Pts: Russell 19; Rebs: Jackson, Russell 9 Asts: Mitchell, Rocci 6	Box Score	Pts: Potter 22; Rebs: Maley 15; Asts: McDonald 8	Attendance: 2,124

23 November 2023	Adelaide Lightning	51–74	Townsville Fire	Adelaide Arena, Adelaide
7:00 PM (ACDT)	Scoring by quarter: 14–27, 11–11, 17–22, 9–14
9Now	Pts: Willoughby 20; Rebs: Turner 15; Asts: Mansfield 5	Box Score	Pts: Kunek 19; Rebs: Ruef 13; Asts: Ruef 6	Attendance: 530

25 November 2023	Bendigo Spirit	82–66	Sydney Flames	Red Energy Arena, Bendigo
6:30 PM (AEDT)	Scoring by quarter: 17–18, 20–28, 28–9, 17–11
9Now	Pts: Three players 17; Rebs: Three players 7 Asts: K Wilson 5	Box Score	Pts: George 14; Rebs: George 13; Asts: Madgen, Nicholson 3	Attendance: 657

25 November 2023	Perth Lynx	76–92	Townsville Fire	Bendat Basketball Centre, Perth
6:30PM (AWST)	Scoring by quarter: 23–22, 26–23, 10–28, 17–19
9Now	Pts: Atwell 25; Rebs: Maley 10; Asts: McDonald 7	Box Score	Pts: Aokuso 18; Rebs: Aokuso, Ruef 8 Asts: Whitcomb 8	Attendance: 647

26 November 2023	Melbourne Boomers	87–81(OT)	Canberra Capitals	Gippsland Regional Indoor Stadium, Traralgon
3:00 PM (AEDT)	Scoring by quarter: 16–20, 23–18, 17–15, 20–23, Overtime: 11–5
9Now	Pts: Hillmon 33; Rebs: Froling 14; Asts: Canada 9	Box Score	Pts: Melbourne 24; Rebs: Sharp 14; Asts: Melbourne 7	Attendance: 1,100

=== Round 5 ===
29 November 2023	Townsville Fire	67–61	Adelaide Lightning	Townsville Entertainment Centre, Townsville
6:00 PM (AEST)	Scoring by quarter: 15–19, 19–11, 16–21, 17–10
ESPN	Pts: Aokuso 23; Rebs: Ruef 19; Asts: Kunek 5	Box Score	Pts: Borlase 18; Rebs: Turner 17; Asts: Turner 4	Attendance: 2,141

2 December 2023	Southside Flyers	81–64	Canberra Capitals	State Basketball Centre, Melbourne
5:00 PM (AEDT)	Scoring by quarter: 24–10, 14–21, 21–17, 22–16
9Now	Pts: Russell 21; Rebs: Russell 11; Asts: Cole, Mitchell 6	Box Score	Pts: Munger 15; Rebs: Sharp 10; Asts: Melbourne 7	Attendance: 1,754

2 December 2023	Adelaide Lightning	65–70(OT)	Bendigo Spirit	Adelaide Arena, Adelaide
7:00 PM (ACDT)	Scoring by quarter: 15–19, 8–9, 15–22, 22–10, Overtime: 5–10
9Now	Pts: Borlase, Bourne 17; Rebs: Turner 15; Asts: Borlase, Mansfield 5	Box Score	Pts: Kraker, Wilson 16; Rebs: Griffin 11; Asts: Wilson 4	Attendance: 742

3 December 2023	Melbourne Boomers	63–80	Perth Lynx	Parkville Stadium, Melbourne
3:00 PM (AEDT)	Scoring by quarter: 19–19, 9–23, 25–14, 10–24
9Now	Pts: Canada 21; Rebs: Hillmon 15; Asts: Canada 5	Box Score	Pts: McDonald 21; Rebs: Maley 17; Asts: McDonald 9	Attendance: 2,060

=== Round 6 ===
6 December 2023	Adelaide Lightning	64–66	Sydney Flames	Adelaide Arena, Adelaide
6:30 PM (ACDT)	Scoring by quarter: 21–21, 11–13, 12–15, 20–17
ESPN	Pts: Borlase 14; Rebs: Borlase, Turner 9 Asts: Turner 7	Box Score	Pts: Nicholson 20; Rebs: George 15; Asts: George, Madgen 4	Attendance: 521

7 December 2023	Perth Lynx	62–93	Melbourne Boomers	Bendat Basketball Centre, Perth
6:30 PM (AWST)	Scoring by quarter: 22–17, 17–26, 19–23, 4–27
9Now	Pts: Atwell, McDonald 15; Rebs: Maley 9 Asts: McDonald 5	Box Score	Pts: Hillmon 20; Rebs: Froling 10; Asts: Canada 12	Attendance: 571

8 December 2023	Canberra Capitals	70–72	Sydney Flames	National Convention Centre Canberra, Canberra
7:00 PM (AEDT)	Scoring by quarter: 14–22, 18–22, 23–5, 15–23
9Now	Pts: Melbourne 19; Rebs: Sharp 10; Asts: Melbourne 4	Box Score	Pts: Nicholson 26; Rebs: George 5 Asts: George 5	Attendance: 1,273

9 December 2023	Southside Flyers	76–51	Bendigo Spirit	State Basketball Centre, Melbourne
7:00 PM (AEDT)	Scoring by quarter: 17–7, 22–14, 24–17, 13–13
9Now	Pts: Puoch 17; Rebs: Russell 11; Asts: Cole 4	Box Score	Pts: Griffin 16; Rebs: Griffin 7 Asts: A Wilson 6	Attendance: 1,976

10 December 2023	Adelaide Lightning	95–98(OT)	Perth Lynx	Adelaide Arena, Adelaide
3:00 PM (ACDT)	Scoring by quarter: 26–13, 23–23, 19–25, 20–27, Overtime: 7–10
9Now	Pts: Mansfield, Willoughby 23; Rebs: Turner 13; Asts: Three players 4	Box Score	Pts: McDonald 35; Rebs: Maley 15; Asts: Atwell 5	Attendance: 855

10 December 2023	Canberra Capitals	55–84	Townsville Fire	National Convention Centre Canberra, Canberra
5:30 PM (AEDT)	Scoring by quarter: 19–18, 13–19, 11–25, 12–22
9Now	Pts: Sharp 13; Rebs: Sharp 9 Asts: Clark, Melbourne 5	Box Score	Pts: Woods 17; Rebs: Ruef 10; Asts: Whitcomb 7	Attendance: 1,598

=== Round 7 ===
13 December 2023	Perth Lynx	98–58	Sydney Flames	Bendat Basketball Centre, Perth
6:30 PM (AWST)	Scoring by quarter: 23–19, 29–14, 26–8, 20–17
ESPN	Pts: Atwell 21; Rebs: Maley 15; Asts: McDonald 5	Box Score	Pts: George, Hurst 13; Rebs: George 13; Asts: Rowe 4	Attendance: 913

14 December 2023	Southside Flyers	77–105	Townsville Fire	State Basketball Centre, Melbourne
7:00 PM (AEDT)	Scoring by quarter: 15–31, 21–29, 19–29, 22–16
9Now	Pts: Dickey, Russell 20; Rebs: Three players 4 Asts: Cole 10	Box Score	Pts: Reid 22; Rebs: Whitcomb 6 Asts: Reid 6	Attendance: 1,453

15 December 2023	Canberra Capitals	84–72	Melbourne Boomers	Southern Cross Stadium, Canberra
5:30 PM (AEDT)	Scoring by quarter: 20–16, 26–21, 19–21, 19–14
9Now	Pts: Melbourne 30; Rebs: Sharp 13; Asts: Melbourne 10	Box Score	Pts: Hillmon 14; Rebs: Hillmon 12; Asts: Canada 5	Attendance: 1,212

15 December 2023	Bendigo Spirit	81–77	Adelaide Lightning	Geelong Arena, Geelong
7:30 PM (AEDT)	Scoring by quarter: 19–12, 15–20, 23–19, 24–26
9Now	Pts: Kraker 20; Rebs: Griffin 8 Asts: Kraker 5	Box Score	Pts: Mansfield 28; Rebs: Turner 11; Asts: Turner 4	Attendance: 450

16 December 2023	Sydney Flames	48–70	Townsville Fire	Quaycentre, Sydney
6:00 PM (AEDT)	Scoring by quarter: 9–15, 11–18, 14–15, 14–22
9Now	Pts: Nicholson 11; Rebs: George 9 Asts: Nicholson 5	Box Score	Pts: Woods 19; Rebs: Ruef 15; Asts: Woods 5	Attendance: 1,326

17 December 2023	Melbourne Boomers	59–68	Adelaide Lightning	Parkville Stadium, Melbourne
3:00 PM (AEDT)	Scoring by quarter: 22–20, 15–18, 14–15, 8–15
9Now	Pts: Blicavs 21; Rebs: Blicavs, Froling 10; Asts: Blicavs, Conti 4	Box Score	Pts: Borlase 21; Rebs: Turner 14; Asts: Mansfield 8	Attendance: 2,256

17 December 2023	Bendigo Spirit	81–91	Southside Flyers	Red Energy Arena, Bendigo
5:30 PM (AEDT)	Scoring by quarter: 19–14, 18–25, 23–23, 21–29
9Now	Pts: Kraker 20; Rebs: Three players 5 Asts: K Wilson 6	Box Score	Pts: Cole, Rocci 24; Rebs: Jackson 10; Asts: Rocci 7	Attendance: 599

=== Round 8 ===
20 December 2023	Melbourne Boomers	58–86	Sydney Flames	Parkville Stadium, Melbourne
7:00 PM (AEDT)	Scoring by quarter: 16–20, 13–22, 19–18, 10–26
ESPN	Pts: Froling 14; Rebs: Froling 9 Asts: Rocci 4	Box Score	Pts: Nicholson 24; Rebs: George 8 Asts: Bradley 9	Attendance: 1,868

21 December 2023	Canberra Capitals	86–73	Adelaide Lightning	Collegians Centre, Canberra
7:00 PM (AEDT)	Scoring by quarter: 24–14, 19–19, 23–18, 20–22
9Now	Pts: Melbourne 31; Rebs: Fowler, Sharp 13; Asts: Melbourne 7	Box Score	Pts: Borlase, Mansfield 16; Rebs: Turner 12; Asts: Mansfield, Willoughby 13	Attendance: 1,515

22 December 2023	Sydney Flames	79–67	Bendigo Spirit	Quaycentre, Sydney
7:00 PM (AEDT)	Scoring by quarter: 19–25, 24–26, 19–9, 17–7
9Now	Pts: Nicholson 20; Rebs: George 8 Asts: George 9	Box Score	Pts: Griffin 14; Rebs: Davis 8 Asts: A Wilson 8	Attendance: 1,118

23 December 2023	Perth Lynx	95–85	Southside Flyers	Bendat Basketball Centre, Perth
3:30 PM (AWST)	Scoring by quarter: 27–25, 21–21, 29–23, 18–16
9Now	Pts: Atwell 27; Rebs: Potter 12; Asts: McDonald 8	Box Score	Pts: Russell 20; Rebs: Russell 12; Asts: Cole 6	Attendance: 1,002

23 December 2023	Townsville Fire	62–82	Melbourne Boomers	Townsville Entertainment Centre, Townsville
7:30 PM (AEST)	Scoring by quarter: 15–18, 15–14, 14–29, 18–21
9Now	Pts: Woods 22; Rebs: Ruef 9 Asts: Reid 6	Box Score	Pts: Hillmon 22; Rebs: Froling 11; Asts: Reed 7	Attendance: 2,530

=== Round 9 ===
27 December 2023	Perth Lynx	98–90	Canberra Capitals	Bendat Basketball Centre, Perth
6:30 PM (AWST)	Scoring by quarter: 15–27, 27–19, 33–24, 23–20
ESPN	Pts: Atwell 36; Rebs: Maley 15; Asts: Ciabattoni 7	Box Score	Pts: Melbourne 25; Rebs: Sharp 10; Asts: Melbourne 8	Attendance: 949

29 December 2023	Sydney Flames	77–74(OT)	Townsville Fire	Qudos Bank Arena, Sydney
5:00 PM (AEDT)	Scoring by quarter: 10–8, 12–24, 27–18, 15–14, Overtime: 13–10
9Now	Pts: Richards 21; Rebs: George 11; Asts: Nicholson 10	Box Score	Pts: Whitcomb 26; Rebs: Ruef 14; Asts: Reid 5	Attendance: 3,121

30 December 2023	Melbourne Boomers	78–81	Bendigo Spirit	Parkville Stadium, Melbourne
5:00 PM (AEDT)	Scoring by quarter: 18–16, 20–17, 22–29, 18–19
9Now	Pts: Canada, Froling 16; Rebs: Hillmon 13; Asts: Canada 8	Box Score	Pts: Froling 23; Rebs: Froling 12; Asts: Wehrung, A Wilson 5	Attendance: 1,828

30 December 2023	Adelaide Lightning	62–87	Southside Flyers	Adelaide Arena, Adelaide
7:00 PM (ACDT)	Scoring by quarter: 24–19, 16–22, 15–31, 7–15
9Now	Pts: Willoughby 25; Rebs: Turner, Willoughby 5 Asts: Mansfield 5	Box Score	Pts: Puoch 20; Rebs: Jackson 9 Asts: Rocci 9	Attendance: 855

31 December 2023	Townsville Fire	87–64	Perth Lynx	Townsville Entertainment Centre, Townsville
7:00 PM (AEST)	Scoring by quarter: 24–23, 14–15, 22–13, 27–13
9Now	Pts: Whitcomb 26; Rebs: Ruef 12; Asts: Reid 7	Box Score	Pts: Maley 18; Rebs: Maley 13; Asts: Forster 4	Attendance: 2,798

=== Round 10 ===
3 January 2024	Melbourne Boomers	67–61	Southside Flyers	Parkville Stadium, Melbourne
6:00 PM (AEDT)	Scoring by quarter: 21–21, 9–20, 25–11, 12–9
9Now	Pts: Canada 18; Rebs: Hillmon 11; Asts: Canada 5	Box Score	Pts: Russell 17; Rebs: Russell 12; Asts: Cole 6	Attendance: 2,309

3 January 2024	Townsville Fire	104–91	Perth Lynx	Townsville Entertainment Centre, Townsville
7:30 PM (AEST)	Scoring by quarter: 23–30, 31–22, 26–19, 24–20
ESPN	Pts: Ruef 21; Rebs: Aokuso, Ruef 10; Asts: Woods 7	Box Score	Pts: Atwell 25; Rebs: Maley 8 Asts: Atwell, Hannan 3	Attendance: 2,289

5 January 2024	Adelaide Lightning	74–67	Sydney Flames	Adelaide Arena, Adelaide
7:00 PM (ACDT)	Scoring by quarter: 24–19, 12–14, 11–22, 27–12
9Now	Pts: Tonks 15; Rebs: Turner 12; Asts: Turner 6	Box Score	Pts: Richards 21; Rebs: George 13; Asts: Nicholson 8	Attendance: 964

6 January 2024	Southside Flyers	65–75	Canberra Capitals	State Basketball Centre, Melbourne
7:00 PM (AEDT)	Scoring by quarter: 20–14, 14–16, 14–21, 17–24
9Now	Pts: Jackson 16; Rebs: Russell 8 Asts: Cole 6	Box Score	Pts: Melbourne, Sharp 17; Rebs: Melbourne 11; Asts: Melbourne 5	Attendance: 1,723

7 January 2024	Sydney Flames	55–62	Melbourne Boomers	Qudos Bank Arena, Sydney
1:30 PM (AEDT)	Scoring by quarter: 12–13, 16–18, 14–15, 13–16
9Now	Pts: Nicholson 19; Rebs: Richards 15; Asts: Three players 3	Box Score	Pts: Hillmon 14; Rebs: Hillmon 10; Asts: Canada 7	Attendance: 3,432

7 January 2024	Bendigo Spirit	72–86	Townsville Fire	Geelong Arena, Geelong
3:30 PM (AEDT)	Scoring by quarter: 20–21, 18–19, 20–23, 14–23
9Now	Pts: Wilson 19; Rebs: Froling, Griffin 6 Asts: Wilson 4	Box Score	Pts: Reid 23; Rebs: Ruef 12; Asts: Whitcomb 9	Attendance: 440

7 January 2024	Perth Lynx	84–68	Adelaide Lightning	Bendat Basketball Centre, Perth
3:00 PM (AWST)	Scoring by quarter: 20–14, 17–14, 31–21, 16–19
9Now	Pts: Potter 26; Rebs: Potter 11; Asts: Ciabattoni 5	Box Score	Pts: Borlase 31; Rebs: Turner 17; Asts: Brazel, Turner 3	Attendance: 1,042

=== Round 11 ===
10 January 2024	Bendigo Spirit	96–68	Adelaide Lightning	Red Energy Arena, Bendigo
5:00 PM (AEDT)	Scoring by quarter: 33–15, 18-25, 20–10, 25–18
9Now	Pts: Wehrung 18; Rebs: Davis 9 Asts: A Wilson 9	Box Score	Pts: Borlase 16; Rebs: Turner 11; Asts: Turner 4	Attendance: 414

10 January 2024	Melbourne Boomers	57–69	Townsville Fire	Parkville Stadium, Melbourne
7:00 PM (AEDT)	Scoring by quarter: 10-19, 20-25, 15–13, 12-12
ESPN	Pts: Froling 16; Rebs: Hillmon 9 Asts: Canada, Froling 4	Box Score	Pts: Aokuso 17; Rebs: Ruef 16; Asts: Reid 7	Attendance: 1,496

11 January 2024	Canberra Capitals	81–75	Perth Lynx	National Convention Centre Canberra, Canberra
7:00 PM (AEDT)	Scoring by quarter: 17-19, 20–17, 19-23, 25–16
9Now	Pts: Sharp 25; Rebs: Sharp 19; Asts: Melbourne 8	Box Score	Pts: Atwell 29; Rebs: Maley, Potter 12; Asts: Ciabattoni 4	Attendance: 1,756

12 January 2024	Southside Flyers	79–73	Sydney Flames	State Basketball Centre, Melbourne
7:30 PM (AEDT)	Scoring by quarter: 22–17, 12-21, 25–20, 20–15
9Now	Pts: Jackson 28; Rebs: Dickey 8 Asts: Mitchell 6	Box Score	Pts: Nicholson 17; Rebs: George 7 Asts: Nicholson 8	Attendance: 1,804

13 January 2024	Melbourne Boomers	94–58	Townsville Fire	Parkville Stadium, Melbourne
7:00 PM (AEDT)	Scoring by quarter: 25–16, 22–19, 25–10, 22–13
9Now	Pts: Hillmon 24; Rebs: Hillmon 12; Asts: Canada 10	Box Score	Pts: Aokuso, Brown 13; Rebs: Aokuso 7 Asts: Reid 7	Attendance: 1,620

14 January 2024	Sydney Flames	87–84	Perth Lynx	Qudos Bank Arena, Sydney
1:30 PM (AEDT)	Scoring by quarter: 24–16, 21-25, 22–20, 20-23
9Now	Pts: George 28; Rebs: George 10; Asts: Bradley 6	Box Score	Pts: Atwell 22; Rebs: Maley 13; Asts: Maley 5	Attendance: 5,138

14 January 2024	Bendigo Spirit	88–66	Canberra Capitals	Red Energy Arena, Bendigo
3:30 PM (AEDT)	Scoring by quarter: 22-24, 23–21, 30–11, 13–10
9Now	Pts: Griffin 25; Rebs: Griffin 7 Asts: K Wilson 10	Box Score	Pts: Melbourne 15; Rebs: Sharp 12; Asts: Melbourne 5	Attendance: 685

=== Round 12 ===
17 January 2024	Southside Flyers	84–57	Bendigo Spirit	Melbourne Sports and Aquatic Centre, Melbourne
3:00 PM (AEDT)	Scoring by quarter: 30–11, 11–16, 25–13, 18–17
9Now	Pts: Cole 17; Rebs: Russell 7 Asts: Cole 7	Box Score	Pts: Froling 15; Rebs: McGoldrick 6 Asts: A Wilson 4	Attendance: 975

17 January 2024	Sydney Flames	88–65	Adelaide Lightning	Quaycentre, Sydney
7:00 PM (AEDT)	Scoring by quarter: 27–11, 11–16, 22–19, 28–19
ESPN	Pts: Nicholson, Richards 18; Rebs: George 11; Asts: George, Nicholson 6	Box Score	Pts: Willoughby 16; Rebs: Turner 13; Asts: Borlase, Willoughby 4	Attendance: 982

19 January 2024	Sydney Flames	90–65	Canberra Capitals	Quaycentre, Sydney
7:00 PM (AEDT)	Scoring by quarter: 18–17, 24–13, 27–19, 21–16
9Now	Pts: George 18; Rebs: George 10; Asts: Bradley 6	Box Score	Pts: Clark, Sharp 13; Rebs: Three players 4 Asts: Three players 2	Attendance: 1,077

20 January 2024	Townsville Fire	75–90	Adelaide Lightning	Townsville Entertainment Centre, Townsville
6:30 PM (AEST)	Scoring by quarter: 26–17, 15–26, 14–23, 20–24
9Now	Pts: Woods 20; Rebs: Ruef 9 Asts: Whitcomb, Woods 4	Box Score	Pts: Bourne 24; Rebs: Turner 16; Asts: Willoughby 6	Attendance: 2,631

20 January 2024	Perth Lynx	74–95	Bendigo Spirit	Bendat Basketball Centre, Perth
6:30 PM (AWST)	Scoring by quarter: 21–28, 19–20, 22–17, 12–30
9Now	Pts: Potter 20; Rebs: Potter 7 Asts: Goodchild 6	Box Score	Pts: Kraker 27; Rebs: Davis 10; Asts: A Wilson 13	Attendance: 898

21 January 2024	Melbourne Boomers	82–84	Southside Flyers	Parkville Stadium, Melbourne
3:00 PM (AEDT)	Scoring by quarter: 19–26, 21–19, 14–18, 28–21
9Now	Pts: Canada 21; Rebs: Hillmon 9 Asts: Canada 8	Box Score	Pts: Jackson 20; Rebs: Russell 8 Asts: Rocci 6	Attendance: 3,009

=== Round 13 ===
24 January 2024	Melbourne Boomers	90–76	Perth Lynx	Parkville Stadium, Melbourne
7:00 PM (AEDT)	Scoring by quarter: 33–9, 18–32, 26–16, 13–19
ESPN	Pts: Conti 19; Rebs: Blicavs 12; Asts: Canada 7	Box Score	Pts: Goodchild 15; Rebs: Maley 11; Asts: Goodchild 4	Attendance: 1,626

25 January 2024	Bendigo Spirit	93–75	Canberra Capitals	Red Energy Arena, Bendigo
6:00 PM (AEDT)	Scoring by quarter: 25–14, 29–26, 14–16, 25–19
9Now	Pts: Griffin, A Wilson 23; Rebs: Griffin 9 Asts: Kraker 6	Box Score	Pts: Sharp 20; Rebs: Sharp 11; Asts: Fowler 6	Attendance: 1,180

25 January 2024	Sydney Flames	102–81	Southside Flyers	Quaycentre, Sydney
8:00 PM (AEDT)	Scoring by quarter: 29–18, 24–17, 22–23, 27–23
9Now	Pts: George, Nicholson 21; Rebs: Richards 12; Asts: Bradley 6	Box Score	Pts: Cole, Jackson 17; Rebs: Rocci 10; Asts: Cole 6	Attendance: 2,081

27 January 2024	Adelaide Lightning	84–67	Canberra Capitals	Adelaide Arena, Adelaide
5:30 PM (ACDT)	Scoring by quarter: 23–26, 16–15, 18–12, 27–14
9Now	Pts: Willoughby 21; Rebs: Turner 11; Asts: Mansfield 7	Box Score	Pts: Sharp 20; Rebs: Sharp 9 Asts: Melbourne 11	Attendance: 840

30 January 2024	Bendigo Spirit	80–70	Melbourne Boomers	Red Energy Arena, Bendigo
6:00 PM (AEDT)	Scoring by quarter: 19–19, 20–18, 29–19, 12–14
9Now	Pts: Griffin 20; Rebs: Griffin, A Wilson 8 Asts: A Wilson 4	Box Score	Pts: Reed 21; Rebs: Froling 12; Asts: Canada 6	Attendance: 327

30 January 2024	Canberra Capitals	83–91	Townsville Fire	National Convention Centre Canberra, Canberra
7:00 PM (AEDT)	Scoring by quarter: 16–25, 24–22, 16–29, 27–15
9Now	Pts: Potter 25; Rebs: Sharp 9 Asts: Melbourne 6	Box Score	Pts: Reid 23; Rebs: Ruef 8 Asts: Reid 7	Attendance: 1,699

31 January 2024	Southside Flyers	91–70	Perth Lynx	State Basketball Centre, Melbourne
7:30 PM (AEDT)	Scoring by quarter: 19–25, 34–17, 14–11, 24–17
9Now	Pts: Mitchell 22; Rebs: Jackson, Russell 10; Asts: Rocci 9	Box Score	Pts: Atwell 24; Rebs: Atwell 6 Asts: Clinch Hoycard, Goodchild 3	Attendance: 1,054

=== Round 14 ===
15 February 2024	Canberra Capitals	77–85	Bendigo Spirit	Southern Cross Stadium, Canberra
7:00 PM (AEDT)	Scoring by quarter: 20–27, 18–22, 21–17, 18–19
ESPN	Pts: Potter 18; Rebs: Fowler 11; Asts: Sharp 5	Box Score	Pts: Griffin 24; Rebs: Griffin 11; Asts: K Wilson 9	Attendance: 1,222

17 February 2024	Adelaide Lightning	70–61	Melbourne Boomers	Adelaide Arena, Adelaide
6:00 PM (ACDT)	Scoring by quarter: 20–15, 22–18, 15–15, 13–13
9Now	Pts: Turner 17; Rebs: Turner 17; Asts: Mansfield 6	Box Score	Pts: Hillmon 18; Rebs: Hillmon 15; Asts: Canada 9	Attendance: 934

18 February 2024	Sydney Flames	78–81	Southside Flyers	Qudos Bank Arena, Sydney
1:30 PM (AEDT)	Scoring by quarter: 21–23, 24–19, 17–20, 16–19
9Now	Pts: Nicholson, Richards 20; Rebs: George 14; Asts: George, Nicholson 4	Box Score	Pts: Russell 18; Rebs: Three players 7 Asts: Mitchell 5	Attendance: 6,834

18 February 2024	Townsville Fire	60–93	Bendigo Spirit	Townsville Entertainment Centre, Townsville
3:00 PM (AEST)	Scoring by quarter: 17–19, 20–25, 10–23, 13–26
9Now	Pts: Aokuso 11; Rebs: Aokuso 6 Asts: Whitcomb 4	Box Score	Pts: A Wilson 22; Rebs: Griffin 14; Asts: K Wilson 7	Attendance: 2,508

18 February 2024	Perth Lynx	94–79	Canberra Capitals	Bendat Basketball Centre, Perth
3:30 PM (AWST)	Scoring by quarter: 18–15, 28–17, 16–27, 32–20
9Now	Pts: McDonald 24; Rebs: Maley 20; Asts: Maley 8	Box Score	Pts: Potter 20; Rebs: Sharp 13; Asts: Melbourne 11	Attendance: 1,005

=== Round 15 ===
21 February 2024	Townsville Fire	70–77	Southside Flyers	Townsville Entertainment Centre, Townsville
7:30 PM (AEST)	Scoring by quarter: 16-23, 24-26, 15–15, 15–13
9Now	Pts: Reid 19; Rebs: Ruef 10; Asts: Reid, Whitcomb 4	Box Score	Pts: Russell 24; Rebs: Russell 14; Asts: Mitchell 7	Attendance: 2,215

24 February 2024	Canberra Capitals	74–75	Melbourne Boomers	National Convention Centre Canberra, Canberra
2:30 PM (AEDT)	Scoring by quarter: 22-26, 26–18, 7-16, 19–15
9Now	Pts: Munger 20; Rebs: Sharp 12; Asts: Melbourne 11	Box Score	Pts: Hillmon 35; Rebs: Hillmon 8 Asts: Canada, Wallace 4	Attendance: 1,745

24 February 2024	Southside Flyers	60–74	Adelaide Lightning	Parkville Stadium, Melbourne
5:00 PM (AEDT)	Scoring by quarter: 13-17, 16–11, 12-21, 19-25
9Now	Pts: Cole 20; Rebs: Russell 14; Asts: Rocci 6	Box Score	Pts: Turner 20; Rebs: Turner 13; Asts: Borlase, Bourne 5	Attendance: 1,560

24 February 2024	Bendigo Spirit	74–93	Perth Lynx	Red Energy Arena, Bendigo
7:30 PM (AEDT)	Scoring by quarter: 27–16, 22-28, 13-24, 12-25
9Now	Pts: Griffin 24; Rebs: Griffin, A Wilson 12; Asts: A Wilson 5	Box Score	Pts: McDonald 26; Rebs: Maley 11; Asts: McDonald 4	Attendance: 777

25 February 2024	Townsville Fire	90–78	Sydney Flames	Townsville Entertainment Centre, Townsville
6:00 PM (AEST)	Scoring by quarter: 27–23, 21–17, 19–19, 23–19
ESPN	Pts: Ruef 22; Rebs: Ruef 9 Asts: Whitcomb 6	Box Score	Pts: Richards 23; Rebs: George 11; Asts: Nicholson 5	Attendance: 2,690

== Finals ==
Semi Finals
1	Townsville Fire	0
4	Perth Lynx	2
3	Melbourne Boomers	1
2	Southside Flyers	2

Grand Final
4	Perth Lynx	1
2	Southside Flyers	2

== Statistics ==
=== Individual statistic leaders ===
Category	Player	Statistic
Points per game	Aari McDonald (PER)	19.8 PPG
Rebounds per game	Brianna Turner (ADL)	13.8 RPG
Assists per game	Jade Melbourne (CBR)	7.6 APG
Steals per game	Jordin Canada (MEL)	3.1 SPG
Blocks per game	Brianna Turner (ADL)	2.1 BPG

=== Individual game highs ===
Category	Player	Statistic
Points	Lauren Jackson (STH)	38
Rebounds	Brianna Turner (ADL)	23
Assists	Jade Melbourne (CBR)	15
Steals	Maddison Rocci (STH)	9
Blocks	Brianna Turner (ADL)	6

== Awards ==
=== Player of the Round ===
Round #	Player	Ref.
Round 1	Jordin Canada (MEL)	
Round 2	Maddison Rocci (STH)	
Round 3	Aari McDonald (PER)	
Round 4	Naz Hillmon (MEL)	
Round 5	Mikaela Ruef (TSV)	
Round 6	Lauren Nicholson (SYD)	
Round 7	Jade Melbourne (CBR)	
Round 8	Lauren Nicholson (SYD) (2)	
Round 9	Alicia Froling (BEN)	
Round 10	Stephanie Reid (TSV)	
Round 11	Lauren Jackson (STH)	
Round 12	DiDi Richards (SYD)	
Round 13	Kelsey Griffin (BEN)	
Round 14	Kelsey Griffin (BEN) (2)	
Round 15	Naz Hillmon (MEL) (2)	

=== Team of the Round ===
Round #	Team					Ref.
Round 1	Jordin Canada (MEL)	Isobel Borlase (ADL)	Alex Sharp (CBR)	Anneli Maley (PER)	Zitina Aokuso (TSV)	
Round 2	Jordin Canada (MEL) (2)	Aari McDonald (PER)	Maddison Rocci (STH)	Brianna Turner (ADL)	Mercedes Russell (STH)	
Round 3	Jordin Canada (MEL) (3)	Aari McDonald (PER) (2)	Jade Melbourne (CBR)	Isobel Borlase (ADL) (2)	Kelsey Griffin (BEN)	
Round 4	Casey Samuels (BEN)	Keely Froling (MEL)	Mikaela Ruef (TSV)	Naz Hillmon (MEL)	Lauren Jackson (STH)	
Round 5	Aari McDonald (PER) (3)	Alex Wilson (BEN)	Anneli Maley (PER) (2)	Mikaela Ruef (TSV) (2)	Mercedes Russell (STH) (2)	
Round 6	Aari McDonald (PER) (4)	Sami Whitcomb (TSV)	Tess Madgen (SYD)	Lauren Nicholson (SYD)	Nyadiew Puoch (STH)	
Round 7	Rebecca Cole (STH)	Jade Melbourne (CBR) (2)	Courtney Woods (TSV)	Isobel Borlase (ADL) (3)	Amy Atwell (PER)	
Round 8	Aari McDonald (PER) (5)	Jade Melbourne (CBR) (3)	Lauren Nicholson (SYD) (2)	Amy Atwell (PER) (2)	Keely Froling (MEL) (2)	
Round 9	Sami Whitcomb (TSV) (2)	Amy Atwell (PER) (3)	DiDi Richards (SYD)	Alicia Froling (BEN)	Nyadiew Puoch (STH) (2)	
Round 10	Jordin Canada (MEL) (4)	Stephanie Reid (TSV)	Isobel Borlase (ADL) (4)	Alex Sharp (CBR) (2)	Emily Potter (PER)	
Round 11	Alex Wilson (BEN) (2)	Alex Sharp (CBR) (3)	Naz Hillmon (MEL) (2)	Cayla George (SYD)	Lauren Jackson (STH) (2)	
Round 12	Leilani Mitchell (STH)	Mehryn Kraker (BEN)	DiDi Richards (SYD) (2)	Isabelle Bourne (ADL)	Cayla George (SYD) (2)	
Round 13	Leilani Mitchell (STH) (2)	Stephanie Reid (TSV) (2)	Monique Conti (MEL)	Kelsey Griffin (BEN) (2)	Brianna Turner (ADL) (2)	
Round 14	Alex Wilson (BEN) (3)	Anneli Maley (PER) (3)	Kelsey Griffin (BEN) (3)	Brianna Turner (ADL) (3)	Mercedes Russell (STH) (3)	
Round 15	Aari McDonald (PER) (6)	Naz Hillmon (MEL) (3)	Zitina Aokuso (TSV) (2)	Brianna Turner (ADL) (4)	Mercedes Russell (STH) (4)	

=== Postseason Awards ===
Award	Winner	Position	Team
Most Valuable Player	Jordin Canada	Guard	Melbourne Boomers
Grand Final MVP	Mercedes Russell	Center	Southside Flyers
Defensive Player of the Year	Lauren Nicholson	Guard	Sydney Flames
Sixth Woman of the Year	Leilani Mitchell	Guard	Southside Flyers
Breakout Player of the Year	Alex Sharp	Guard	Canberra Capitals
Coach of the Year	Shannon Seebohm	Coach	Townsville Fire
Leading Scorer Award	Aari McDonald	Guard	Perth Lynx
Leading Rebounder Award	Brianna Turner	Forward	Adelaide Lightning
Golden Hands Award	Jordin Canada	Guard	Melbourne Boomers
Cygnett Community Award	Courtney Woods	Guard	Townsville Fire
All-WNBL First Team	Jordin Canada	Guard	Melbourne Boomers
All-WNBL First Team	Jade Melbourne	Guard	Canberra Capitals
All-WNBL First Team	Lauren Nicholson	Guard	Sydney Flames
All-WNBL First Team	Isobel Borlase	Forward	Adelaide Lightning
All-WNBL First Team	Mercedes Russell	Center	Southside Flyers
All-WNBL Second Team	Aari McDonald	Guard	Perth Lynx
All-WNBL Second Team	Sami Whitcomb	Guard	Townsville Fire
All-WNBL Second Team	Amy Atwell	Guard	Perth Lynx
All-WNBL Second Team	DiDi Richards	Forward	Sydney Flames
All-WNBL Second Team	Naz Hillmon	Forward	Melbourne Boomers

== Team captains and coaches ==
Team	Captain	Coach
Adelaide Lightning	Stephanie Talbot	Natalie Hurst
Bendigo Spirit	Kelsey Griffin	Kennedy Kereama
Canberra Capitals	Jade Melbourne / Alexandra Sharp (co)	Kristen Veal
Melbourne Boomers	Keely Froling / Kristy Wallace (co)	Chris Lucas
Perth Lynx	Anneli Maley	Ryan Petrik
Southside Flyers	Rebecca Cole	Cheryl Chambers
Sydney Flames	Tess Madgen	Guy Molloy
Townsville Fire	Sami Whitcomb	Shannon Seebohm
