= WNBL Leading Rebounder Award =

The WNBL Leading Rebounder Award is an annual Women's National Basketball League (WNBL) statistical award given since the 2020 WNBL season.

The Leading Rebounder is determined by the player with the highest average rebounds per game, throughout the regular season. To be eligible, players must have played in at least 50% of games played in the season. Prior to 2020, there was no award for leading the league in rebounds, only the statistical accolade.

== Winners ==
	Denotes player whose team won championship that year
	Denotes player inducted into the Australian Basketball Hall of Fame
	Denotes player who is still active
Player (X)	Denotes the number of times the player had won at that time
Team (X)	Denotes the number of times a player from this team had won at that time

Season	Player	Rebounds	RPG	Nationality	Team
2020	Anneli Maley	157	12.1	Australia	Sydney Uni Flames
2021–22	Anneli Maley (2)	251	15.7	Australia	Bendigo Spirit
2022–23	Cayla George	238	11.3	Australia	Melbourne Boomers
2023–24	Brianna Turner	290	13.8	United States	Adelaide Lightning
2024–25	Brianna Turner (2)	266	12.7	United States	Adelaide Lightning (2)
2025–26	Anneli Maley (3)	326	14.2	Australia	Perth Lynx

== See also ==
- WNBL Leading Scorer Award
- WNBL Golden Hands Award
- WNBA Peak Performers
- WNBL Defensive Player of the Year Award
- All-WNBL Team
