= 2022–23 WNBL season =

- League: Women's National Basketball League
- Sport: Basketball
- Duration: 3 November 2022 – 22 March 2023
- Teams: 8
- Total attendance: 144,010
- TV partner(s): 9Now; ESPN

Regular season
- Top seed: Townsville Fire
- Season MVP: Cayla George (MEL)
- Top scorer: Tiffany Mitchell (MEL)

Finals
- Champions: Townsville Fire
- Runners-up: Southside Flyers
- Finals MVP: Tianna Hawkins (TSV)

WNBL seasons
- ← 2021–22 2023–24 →

The 2022–23 WNBL season is the 43rd season of the competition since its establishment in 1981. The Melbourne Boomers were the defending champions, but were defeated in the Semi-Finals by Southside. The Townsville Fire won their fourth championship title after sweeping Southside, 2–0 in the Grand Final series.

Cygnett was named as the WNBL's naming rights partner for this season, after signing a three-year deal in September 2022. Spalding again provided equipment including the official game ball, alongside iAthletic supplying team apparel for the sixth consecutive season.

In June 2022, the season structure was confirmed to feature an 84-game regular season and best-of-three Semi-Final & Grand Final series' to follow. The WNBL later announced in September 2022 that a new broadcast deal had been signed with the 9Now and ESPN for the upcoming season.

The February 2023 match between the Southside Flyers and the Sydney Flames drew a crowd of 7,681, which is the largest ever WNBL crowd. In total for the season, 127,014 fans attended regular-season games (30% higher than 2019–20), and 16,996 attended the finals series (81% higher than 2019–20), for a total season attendance of 144,010.

== Standings ==
#	WNBL Championship ladder				
#	Team	W	L	PCT	GP
1	Townsville Fire	17	4	80.9	21
2	Southside Flyers	15	6	71.4	21
3	Melbourne Boomers	15	6	71.4	21
4	Perth Lynx	13	8	61.9	21
5	Bendigo Spirit	11	10	52.3	21
6	Sydney Flames	6	15	28.5	21
7	Adelaide Lightning	5	16	23.8	21
8	Canberra Capitals	2	19	5.8	21

== Finals ==
Semi Finals
1	Townsville Fire	2
4	Perth Lynx	0
3	Melbourne Boomers	1
2	Southside Flyers	2

Grand Final
1	Townsville Fire	2
2	Southside Flyers	0

== Statistics ==
=== Individual statistic leaders ===
Category	Player	Statistic
Points per game	Tiffany Mitchell (MEL)	20.2 PPG
Rebounds per game	Cayla George (MEL)	11.3 RPG
Assists per game	Stephanie Reid (TSV)	6.1 APG
Steals per game	Kelsey Griffin (BEN)	2.6 SPG
Blocks per game	Olivia Nelson-Ododa (MEL)	1.5 BPG

=== Individual game highs ===
Category	Player	Statistic
Points	Sara Blicavs (STH)	41
Rebounds	Anneli Maley (BEN)	24
Assists	Stephanie Reid (TSV); Jade Melbourne (CBR)	14
Steals	Kelsey Griffin (BEN)	6
Blocks	Hannah Sjerven (SYD)	5

== Awards ==
=== Player of the Round ===
Round #	Player	Ref.
Round 1	Lauren Nicholson (TSV)	
Round 2	Tiffany Mitchell (MEL)	
Round 3	Lauren Mansfield (ADL)	
Round 4	Anneli Maley (BEN)	
Round 5	Kelsey Griffin (BEN)	
Round 6	Stephanie Reid (TSV)	
Round 7	Cayla George (MEL)	
Round 8	Anneli Maley (BEN) (2)	
Round 9	Sara Blicavs (STH)	
Round 10	Sami Whitcomb (PER)	
Round 11	Lauren Jackson (STH)	
Round 12	Amy Atwell (PER)	
Round 13	Tiana Mangakahia (SYD)	
Round 14	Tianna Hawkins (TSV)	
Round 15	Keely Froling (SYD)	
Round 16		

=== Team of the Round ===
Round #	Team					Ref.
Round 1	Stephanie Reid (TSV)	Lauren Nicholson (TSV)	Isobel Borlase (ADL)	Tiffany Mitchell (MEL)	Kelsey Griffin (BEN)	
Round 2	Kristy Wallace (MEL)	Tiffany Mitchell (MEL) (2)	Amy Atwell (PER)	Anneli Maley (BEN)	Tianna Hawkins (TSV)	
Round 3	Lauren Mansfield (ADL)	Lauren Nicholson (TSV) (2)	Penina Davidson (MEL)	Lauren Scherf (PER)	Cayla George (MEL)	
Round 4	Anneli Maley (BEN) (2)	Sara Blicavs (STH)	Kelsey Griffin (BEN) (2)	Jacinta Monroe (ADL)	Cayla George (MEL) (2)	
Round 5	Shyla Heal (SYD)	Karlie Samuelson (TSV)	Tiffany Mitchell (MEL) (3)	Keely Froling (SYD)	Kelsey Griffin (BEN) (3)	
Round 6	Stephanie Reid (TSV) (2)	Kristy Wallace (MEL) (2)	Kayla Thornton (STH)	Kelsey Griffin (BEN) (4)	Cayla George (MEL) (3)	
Round 7	Shyla Heal (SYD) (2)	Sami Whitcomb (PER)	Mia Murray (MEL)	Lauren Jackson (STH)	Cayla George (MEL) (4)	
Round 8	Shyla Heal (SYD) (3)	Tiffany Mitchell (MEL) (4)	Anneli Maley (BEN) (3)	Chloe Bibby (PER)	Keely Froling (SYD) (2)	
Round 9	Kristy Wallace (MEL) (3)	Isobel Borlase (ADL) (2)	Sara Blicavs (STH) (2)	Tianna Hawkins (TSV) (2)	Lauren Scherf (PER)	
Round 10	Sami Whitcomb (PER) (2)	Anneli Maley (BEN) (4)	Rae Burrell (CBR)	Mikaela Ruef (TSV)	Cayla George (MEL) (5)	
Round 11	Tiana Mangakahia (SYD)	Sami Whitcomb (PER) (3)	Karlie Samuelson (TSV) (2)	Alex Wilson (BEN)	Lauren Jackson (STH) (2)	
Round 12	Jade Melbourne (CBR)	Robbi Ryan (PER)	Amy Atwell (PER) (2)	Kayla Thornton (STH) (2)	Tianna Hawkins (TSV) (3)	
Round 13	Jade Melbourne (CBR) (2)	Tiana Mangakahia (SYD) (2)	Courtney Woods (TSV)	Tianna Hawkins (TSV) (4)	Cayla George (MEL) (6)	
Round 14	Jade Melbourne (CBR) (3)	Chloe Bibby (PER) (2)	Kayla Thornton (STH) (3)	Tianna Hawkins (TSV) (5)	Cayla George (MEL) (7)	
Round 15	Jade Melbourne (CBR) (4)	Tiana Mangakahia (SYD) (3)	Tiffany Mitchell (MEL) (5)	Kayla Thornton (STH) (4)	Keely Froling (SYD) (3)	
Round 16						

=== Postseason Awards ===
Award	Winner	Position	Team
Most Valuable Player	Cayla George	Forward/Center	Melbourne Boomers
Grand Final MVP	Tianna Hawkins	Forward	Townsville Fire
Defensive Player of the Year	Stephanie Talbot	Guard/Forward	Adelaide Lightning
Sixth Woman of the Year	Isobel Borlase	Guard	Adelaide Lightning
Breakout Player of the Year	Isobel Borlase	Guard	Adelaide Lightning
Coach of the Year	Shannon Seebohm	Coach	Townsville Fire
Leading Scorer Award	Tiffany Mitchell	Guard	Melbourne Boomers
Leading Rebounder Award	Cayla George	Forward/Center	Melbourne Boomers
Golden Hands Award	Stephanie Reid	Guard	Townsville Fire
Cygnett Community Award	Stephanie Reid	Guard	Townsville Fire
All-WNBL First Team	Kristy Wallace	Guard	Melbourne Boomers
All-WNBL First Team	Sami Whitcomb	Guard	Perth Lynx
All-WNBL First Team	Kayla Thornton	Forward	Southside Flyers
All-WNBL First Team	Tianna Hawkins	Forward	Townsville Fire
All-WNBL First Team	Cayla George	Forward/Center	Melbourne Boomers
All-WNBL Second Team	Jade Melbourne	Guard	Canberra Capitals
All-WNBL Second Team	Tiffany Mitchell	Guard	Melbourne Boomers
All-WNBL Second Team	Lauren Nicholson	Guard	Townsville Fire
All-WNBL Second Team	Stephanie Talbot	Guard/Forward	Adelaide Lightning
All-WNBL Second Team	Lauren Scherf	Center	Perth Lynx

== Team captains and coaches ==
Team	Captain	Coach
Adelaide Lightning	Stephanie Talbot	Natalie Hurst
Bendigo Spirit	Kelsey Griffin	Kennedy Kereama
Canberra Capitals	Brittany Smart	Kristen Veal
Melbourne Boomers	Cayla George	Chris Lucas
Perth Lynx	Sami Whitcomb	Ryan Petrik
Southside Flyers	Aimie Rocci	Cheryl Chambers
Sydney Uni Flames	Keely Froling	Shane Heal
Townsville Fire	Lauren Nicholson	Shannon Seebohm
