= 2020 WNBL season =

WNBL season
- League: Women's National Basketball League
- Sport: Basketball
- Duration: 11 November 2020 – 20 December 2020
- Teams: 8
- TV partner(s): ABC; Fox Sports

Regular season
- Top seed: Southside Flyers
- Season MVP: Stephanie Talbot (ADL)
- Top scorer: Liz Cambage (STH)

Finals
- Champions: Southside Flyers
- Runners-up: Townsville Fire
- Finals MVP: Leilani Mitchell (STH)

WNBL seasons
- ← 2019–20 2021–22 →

The 2020 WNBL season was the 41st season of the competition since its establishment in 1981. The Canberra Capitals were the two-time defending champions, but were defeated in the semi-finals by Melbourne. The Southside Flyers won the Grand Final, defeating the Townsville Fire, 99–82. The Flyers took home the franchise's fourth WNBL title overall, this being their first since rebranding as Southside.

Chemist Warehouse was again the WNBL's naming rights partner for this season, after signing a three-year deal in July 2018. Spalding again provided equipment including the official game ball, alongside iAthletic supplying team apparel for the fourth consecutive season.

Due to the COVID-19 pandemic, a North Queensland hub was set to host the season. The season was originally 2020–21 and would be traditionally played over several months across the summer, however this season's scheduling had been condensed. The six-week season saw Townsville, Cairns and Mackay host a 52-game regular season fixture, plus a four-game final series (2 x semi-finals, preliminary final and grand final). Each team contested 13 games starting on 11 November, with the grand final scheduled for 20 December.

== Standings ==
#	WNBL Championship ladder				
#	Team	W	L	PCT	GP
1	Southside Flyers	11	2	84.6	13
2	Townsville Fire	9	4	69.2	13
3	Canberra Capitals	9	4	69.2	13
4	Melbourne Boomers	9	4	69.2	13
5	Sydney Uni Flames	5	8	38.5	13
6	Adelaide Lightning	5	8	38.5	13
7	Perth Lynx	4	9	30.8	13
8	Bendigo Spirit	0	13	0.0	13

== Finals ==
Semifinals
Southside Flyers	106
Townsville Fire	93
Canberra Capitals	68
Melbourne Boomers	78

Preliminary final
Townsville Fire	65
Melbourne Boomers	62

Grand final
Southside Flyers	99
Townsville Fire	82

== Statistics ==
=== Individual statistic leaders ===
Category	Player	Statistic
Points per game	Liz Cambage (STH)	23.6 PPG
Rebounds per game	Anneli Maley (SYD)	12.1 RPG
Assists per game	Leilani Mitchell (STH)	6.5 APG
Steals per game	Alison Schwagmeyer (SYD)	2.2 SPG
Blocks per game	Liz Cambage (STH)	1.9 BPG

=== Individual game highs ===
Category	Player	Statistic
Points	Liz Cambage (STH)	35
Rebounds	Anneli Maley (SYD)	20
Assists	Tessa Lavey (BEN)	11
Assists	Leilani Mitchell (STH)	11
Steals	Stephanie Talbot (ADL)	7
Blocks	Liz Cambage (STH)	6

== Awards ==
=== Player of the Round ===
Round #	Player	Ref.
Round 1	Stephanie Talbot (ADL)	
Round 2	Liz Cambage (STH)	
Round 3	Shyla Heal (TSV)	
Round 4	Darcee Garbin (PER)	
Round 5	Lauren Mansfield (SYD)	

=== Team of the Round ===
Round #	Team					Ref.
Round 1	Maddison Rocci (CBR)	Tess Madgen (MEL)	Stephanie Talbot (ADL)	Cayla George (MEL)	Liz Cambage (STH)	
Round 2	Jade Melbourne (CBR)	Shyla Heal (TSV)	Lauren Nicholson (TSV)	Lauren Scherf (SYD)	Liz Cambage (STH) (2)	
Round 3	Shyla Heal (TSV) (2)	Stephanie Talbot (ADL) (2)	Anneli Maley (SYD)	Darcee Garbin (PER)	Liz Cambage (STH) (3)	
Round 4	Katie Ebzery (PER)	Lauren Nicholson (TSV) (2)	Darcee Garbin (PER) (2)	Ezi Magbegor (MEL)	Liz Cambage (STH) (4)	
Round 5	Lauren Mansfield (SYD)	Rebecca Cole (STH)	Anneli Maley (SYD) (2)	Cayla George (MEL) (2)	Zitina Aokuso (TSV)	

=== Postseason Awards ===
Award	Winner	Position	Team
Most Valuable Player	Stephanie Talbot	Guard/Forward	Adelaide Lightning
Grand Final MVP	Leilani Mitchell	Guard	Southside Flyers
Defensive Player of the Year	Stephanie Talbot	Guard/Forward	Adelaide Lightning
Sixth Woman of the Year	Zitina Aokuso	Forward/Center	Townsville Fire
Youth Player of the Year	Shyla Heal	Guard	Townsville Fire
Coach of the Year	Shannon Seebohm	Coach	Townsville Fire
Leading Scorer Award	Liz Cambage	Center	Southside Flyers
Leading Rebounder Award	Anneli Maley	Forward	Sydney Uni Flames
Golden Hands Award	Leilani Mitchell	Guard	Southside Flyers
All-WNBL First Team	Katie Ebzery	Guard	Perth Lynx
All-WNBL First Team	Lauren Nicholson	Guard	Townsville Fire
All-WNBL First Team	Stephanie Talbot	Guard/Forward	Adelaide Lightning
All-WNBL First Team	Cayla George	Forward/Center	Melbourne Boomers
All-WNBL First Team	Liz Cambage	Center	Southside Flyers
All-WNBL Second Team	Shyla Heal	Guard	Townsville Fire
All-WNBL Second Team	Maddison Rocci	Guard/	Canberra Capitals
All-WNBL Second Team	Tess Madgen	Guard	Melbourne Boomers
All-WNBL Second Team	Sara Blicavs	Forward	Southside Flyers
All-WNBL Second Team	Ezi Magbegor	Forward/Center	Melbourne Boomers

== Team captains and coaches ==
Team	Captain	Coach
Adelaide Lightning	Stephanie Talbot	Chris Lucas
Bendigo Spirit	Tessa Lavey	Tracy York
Canberra Capitals	Kelsey Griffin / Marianna Tolo (co)	Paul Goriss
Melbourne Boomers	Madeleine Garrick / Cayla George (co)	Guy Molloy
Perth Lynx	Katie Ebzery	Ryan Petrik
Southside Flyers	Jenna O'Hea	Cheryl Chambers
Sydney Uni Flames	Lauren Mansfield / Alison Schwagmeyer (co)	Katrina Hibbert
Townsville Fire	Gaze, Murray, Nicholson, Payne (group)	Shannon Seebohm
