= Lauren Nicholson (basketball) =

Australian basketball player

No. 1 – Townsville Fire
- Position: Guard
- League: WNBL

Personal information
- Born: 26 March 1993 (age 33) Campbelltown, New South Wales
- Listed height: 6 ft 0 in (1.83 m)

Career information
- High school: Woolooware (Woolooware, New South Wales)
- College: Saint Mary's (2012–2016)
- WNBA draft: 2016: undrafted
- Playing career: 2009–present

Career history
- 2009–2011: Sydney Uni Flames
- 2016–2017: Sydney Uni Flames
- 2017–2020: Adelaide Lightning
- 2020–2023: Townsville Fire
- 2023-present: Sydney Flames

Career highlights
- 2x WNBL champion (2017, 2023); 2x WNBL Defensive Player of the Year (2019, 2024); All-WNBL Second Team (2020)
Medals
Representing Australia
Women's basketball
FIBA Asia Cup
Bronze medal – third place	2019 Bangalore
Bronze medal – third place	2021 Jordan
Bronze medal – third place	2023 Australia

Lauren Nicholson (born 26 March 1993) is an Australian professional basketball player.

== College ==
Nicholson played college basketball at Saint Mary's College of California in Moraga, California for the Saint Mary's Gaels.

=== Statistics ===
Year	Team	GP	GS	MPG	FG%	3P%	FT%	RPG	APG	SPG	BPG	TO	PPG
2012–13	Saint Mary's	31	0	13.9	31.6%	28.6%	76.7%	1.6	0.3	0.1	0.3	0.6	3.0
2013–14	Saint Mary's	18	16	29.7	49.4%	48.0%	80.0%	2.7	1.3	0.0	0.7	1.8	12.4
2014–15	Saint Mary's	33	33	33.1	47.0%	33.6%	81.7%	3.5	1.8	0.2	1.1	3.2	17.6
2015–16	Saint Mary's	28	25	31.6	45.4%	30.1%	89.0%	3.9	2.1	0.1	0.6	2.3	17.0
Career		110	74	26.7	45.4%	36.0%	84.3%	2.9	1.4	0.1	0.7	2.0	12.5

== Career ==
=== WNBL ===
Nicholson would begin her WNBL career in her home town, as a development player, with the Sydney Uni Flames. Nicholson remained a member of the Flames squad through to 2011. She then departed to begin her college career in the United States. After the conclusion of her college career, Nicholson returned to Australia and she was signed by the Sydney Uni Flames for 2016–17.

During her second season with the Adelaide Lightning, Nicholson was recognised as the WNBL Defensive Player of the Year for the 2018–19 season.

In 2020, Nicholson would head North and sign with the Townsville Fire for the 2020–21 WNBL season.

=== NBL1 ===
Nicholson joined the Sutherland Sharks of the NBL1 East for the 2025 season. On 18 July 2025, she recorded 51 points, 11 rebounds, six assists and three steals in a 110–102 overtime win over the Inner West Bulls.

== National team ==
=== Youth Level ===
Nicholson first played for Australia at the 2009 FIBA Oceania Under-16 Championship for Women where she took home Gold in Brisbane, Australia. She would then go on to participate in the inaugural Under-17 world championship in France where Australia placed seventh.

=== Senior Level ===
In January 2019, Nicholson was named to her first Opals squad, earning her a place in the first camp as preparations for this years upcoming tournaments got underway. After taking part in the Opals team camps, Nicholson was named to the final roster for the 2019 FIBA Asia Cup where she would make her Opals debut.

In March 2026, Nicholson was named in the Australia women's national 3x3 team as an emergency for the FIBA 3x3 Champions Cup.
