= Shyla Heal =

Australian basketball player (born 2001)

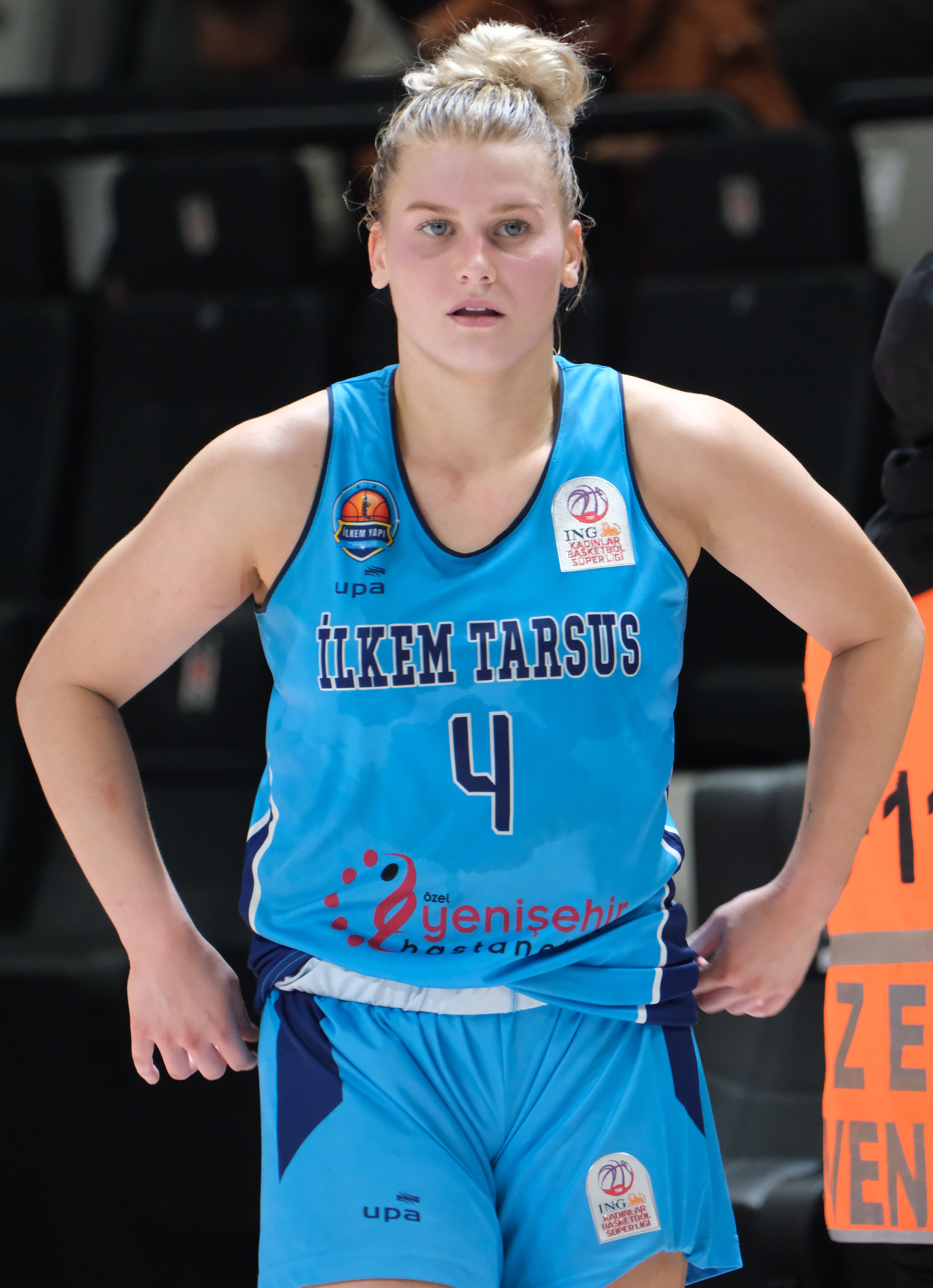
- Heal with Tarsus in 2025

Bankstown Bruins
- Position: Guard
- League: NBL1 East

Personal information
- Born: 19 September 2001 (age 25) Kogarah, New South Wales, Australia
- Listed height: 5 ft 6 in (1.68 m)

Career information
- High school: Brisbane State (Brisbane, Queensland); Lake Ginninderra College (Canberra, ACT)
- WNBA draft: 2021: 1st round, 8th overall pick
- Drafted by: Chicago Sky
- Playing career: 2015–present

Career history
- 2015: South West Metro Pirates
- 2015–2016: South East Queensland Stars
- 2016: Ipswich Force
- 2017–2019: Sutherland Sharks
- 2018: BA Centre of Excellence
- 2018–2019: Perth Lynx
- 2019: Rockhampton Cyclones
- 2019–2020: Bendigo Spirit
- 2020: Townsville Fire
- 2021: Chicago Sky
- 2021–2023: Sydney Flames
- 2022: Northside Wizards
- 2023: Townsville Fire
- 2023–2024: Sydney Comets
- 2023: AZS UMCS Lublin
- 2024: Hapoel Petah Tikva
- 2024: ASVEL Féminin
- 2024–2025: Tarsus Belediyesi Mersin
- 2025–present: Bankstown Bruins
- 2025–2026: Geelong Venom

Career highlights
- WNBL champion (2023); All-WNBL Second Team (2020); WNBL Youth Player of the Year (2020); NBL1 East champion (2026); NBL1 East Grand Final MVP (2026); NBL1 East All-Star Five (2026); NBL1 National Finals All-Star Five (2026)
- Stats at Basketball Reference

Shyla Jade Heal (born 19 September 2001) is an Australian professional basketball player for the Bankstown Bruins of the NBL1 East.

== Early life ==
Heal was born in Kogarah, New South Wales. She attended Brisbane State High School in Brisbane, Queensland, and Lake Ginninderra College in Canberra.

== Professional career ==
After a season in the Queensland Basketball League (QBL) for the South West Metro Pirates in 2015, Heal debuted in the Women's National Basketball League (WNBL) in the 2015–16 season with the South East Queensland Stars as a 14-year-old. Her father, Shane Heal, was coach of the team.

Heal continued in the QBL in 2016 with the Ipswich Force and then had a short stint with the Sutherland Sharks in the Waratah League in 2017. In 2018, she split her year playing for the Sharks in the Waratah League and the BA Centre of Excellence in the SEABL.

For the 2018–19 WNBL season, Heal joined the Perth Lynx. She was injured in the first half of the season after sustaining a stress reaction in her left foot just days before round one.

After splitting 2019 with the Sutherland Sharks in the Waratah League and the Rockhampton Cyclones in the QBL, Heal joined the Bendigo Spirit for the 2019–20 WNBL season. In her debut season with the Spirit, Heal was awarded the Most Consistent Player for her showings, averaging 12.1 points and 4.1 rebounds.

In 2020, Heal played for the Townsville Fire in the WNBL Hub season. She went on to earn WNBL Youth Player of the Year and All-WNBL Second Team.

Heal was selected by the Chicago Sky in the first round of the 2021 WNBA draft. She was unable to participate in the Sky's training camp due to a delay with her visa application, and after playing just 31 minutes in four games, she was traded to the Dallas Wings who then immediately waived her.

For the 2021–22 WNBL season, Heal joined the Sydney Flames. She then played for the Northside Wizards of the NBL1 North in the 2022 season.

Heal returned to the Flames for the 2022–23 WNBL season, but in January 2023, she and her father, coach Shane Heal, parted ways with the Flames. The reasons for their departure were unspecified and coincided with an independent firm's investigation.

On 1 February 2023, Heal signed with the Townsville Fire for the rest of the 2022–23 WNBL season. She went on to help the Fire win the championship.

After playing for the Sydney Comets of the NBL1 East in the 2023 season, Heal joined AZS UMCS Lublin of the Polish Basket Liga Kobiet for the 2023–24 season. She parted ways with Lublin on 4 December 2023. In January 2024, she joined Hapoel Petah Tikva in Israel. After eight games, she joined French team ASVEL Féminin in March.

In May 2024, Heal re-joined the Sydney Comets for the rest of the 2024 NBL1 East season.

In June 2024, Heal signed with Tarsus Belediyesi Mersin of the Women's Basketball Super League.

In March 2025, Heal joined the Phoenix Mercury for training camp. She was waived by the Mercury prior to the start of the 2025 WNBA season.

On 23 May 2025, Heal signed with the Bankstown Bruins for the rest of the 2025 NBL1 East season.

On 16 June 2025, Heal signed with the Geelong Venom for the 2025–26 WNBL season. She parted ways with the Venom after one season.

With the Bruins in the 2026 NBL1 East season, Heal was named to the All-Star Five. She helped the Bruins win the NBL1 East championship in a 90–85 grand final victory over the Manly Warringah Sea Eagles behind a grand final MVP performance of 26 points, four rebounds and four assists. At the 2026 NBL1 National Finals, the Bruins reached the championship game, where they were defeated 86–73 by the Knox Raiders despite Heal's game highs of 30 points and seven assists. She was named to the NBL1 National Finals All-Star Five.

== National team career ==
Heal made her international debut for the Sapphires at the 2017 FIBA Under-17 Oceania Championship in Hagåtña, Guam, where Australia would take home the gold. Heal was named MVP to the Championship game. In 2017, Heal also helped lead the Sapphires to gold at the FIBA Under-16 Asian Championship in Bengaluru, India. Heal would then go on to represent the Sapphires at the Under-17 World Cup in Belarus the following year, where they finished in third place, taking home the bronze medal. Heal also earned a spot on the All-Tournament Team, awarded to the five strongest players of the tournament, after averaging 16.0 points per game.

Heal then made her debut for the Gems at the 2019 Under-19 World Cup in Bangkok, Thailand, where the Gems took home silver after returning to the final for the first time since 1997.

Heal made her senior debut for the Opals in 2022 at the FIBA World Cup Qualifiers in Belgrade, Serbia.

== Personal life ==
Heal is the daughter of former Australian Boomer and NBA player, Shane Heal.

== Career statistics ==
Legend
GP	Games played	GS	Games started	MPG	Minutes per game	RPG	Rebounds per game
APG	Assists per game	SPG	Steals per game	BPG	Blocks per game	PPG	Points per game
TO	Turnovers per game	FG%	Field-goal percentage	3P%	3-point field-goal percentage	FT%	Free-throw percentage
**Bold**	Career best	°	League leader

=== WNBA ===
==== Regular season ====
Year	Team	GP	GS	MPG	FG%	3P%	FT%	RPG	APG	SPG	BPG	TO	PPG
2021	Chicago	4	0	7.8	.125	.000	1.000	.8	.8	.0	.0	2.5	2.0

Source: basketball-reference.com
