= Zitina Aokuso =

Australian basketball player

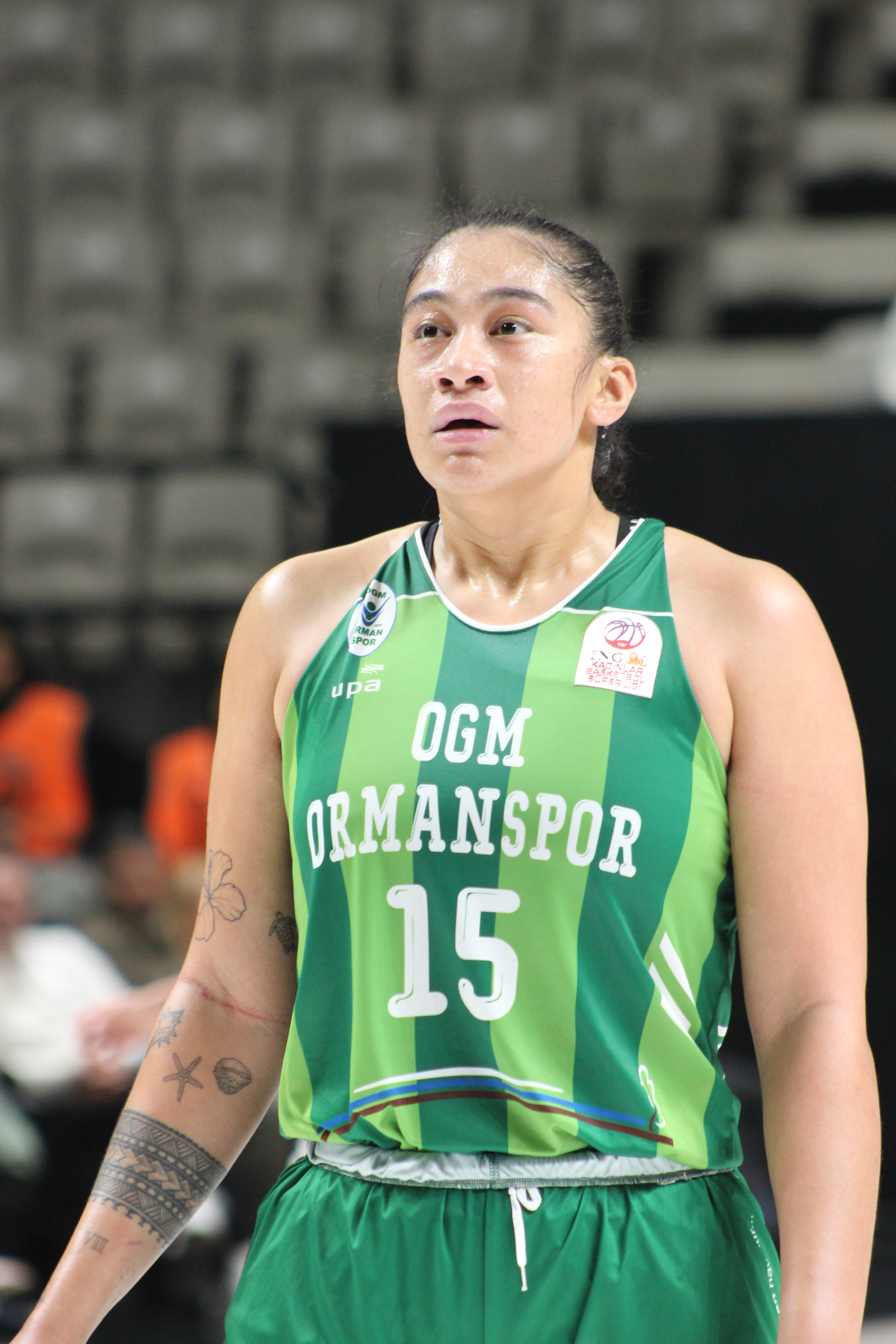
- Aokuso with OGM Ormanspor in 2024

Adelaide Lightning
- Position: Power forward / centre
- League: WNBL

Personal information
- Born: 23 November 1998 (age 27) Penrith, New South Wales, Australia
- Listed height: 193 cm (6 ft 4 in)

Career information
- High school: Runcorn State (Brisbane, Queensland)
- Playing career: 2016–present

Career history
- 2016–2017: BA Centre of Excellence
- 2017–2024: Townsville Fire
- 2018: Logan Thunder
- 2019: Geelong Supercats
- 2021: Melbourne Tigers
- 2022: Ballarat Miners
- 2023–2024: Mount Gambier Pioneers
- 2024–2025: OGM Ormanspor
- 2025: Willetton Tigers
- 2025–2026: University of Canberra Capitals
- 2026: Melbourne Tigers
- 2026–present: Adelaide Lightning

Career highlights
- 2× WNBL champion (2018, 2023); All-NBL1 West First Team (2025)
Medals
Women's basketball
Representing Australia
Asia Cup
Gold medal – first place	2025 China
Bronze medal – third place	2021 Jordan

Zitina Lusia Aokuso (born 23 November 1998) is an Australian professional basketball player.

== Early life ==
Aokuso was born in Penrith, New South Wales. She attended Runcorn State High School in Brisbane, Queensland.

== Professional career ==
=== WNBL ===
In May 2017, Aokuso signed with the Townsville Fire of the Women's National Basketball League (WNBL) for the 2017–18 season. She helped the Fire win the 2017–18 WNBL championship.

In April 2018, Aokuso re-signed with the Fire on a two-year contract.

In the 2018–19 WNBL season, Aokuso stepped up in the absence of Suzy Batkovic to average 10.6 points and 6.1 rebounds per game.

Aokuso missed the entire 2019–20 WNBL season with an ACL injury suffered during the 2019 pre-season.

In February 2020, Aokuso re-signed with the Fire on a two-year contract.

With the Fire in the 2020 WNBL Hub season in Queensland, Aokuso averaged 9.6 points, 5.4 rebounds and 1.1 assists in 16 games.

Aokuso continued with the Fire in 2021–22, 2022–23 and 2023–24.

On 12 June 2025, Aokuso signed with the University of Canberra Capitals for the 2025–26 WNBL season. On 2 October 2025, she was ruled out for four to six weeks due to a right knee injury suffered during the Townsville Tip Off preseason tournament.

On 13 May 2026, Aokuso signed with the Adelaide Lightning for the 2026–27 WNBL season.

=== Overseas ===
For the 2024–25 season, Aokuso joined OGM Ormanspor of the Turkish Women's Basketball Super League.

=== Australian state leagues ===
In 2016 and 2017, Aokuso played for the BA Centre of Excellence in the South East Australian Basketball League.

Aokuso played for the Logan Thunder of the Queensland Basketball League in the 2018 season. She then joined the Geelong Supercats of the NBL1 for the inaugural 2019 season.

Aokuso joined the Melbourne Tigers of the NBL1 South for the 2021 season. She then played for the Ballarat Miners in the 2022 NBL1 South season.

For the 2023 NBL1 South season, Aokuso joined the Mount Gambier Pioneers. She missed the first half of the season due to injury. She returned to the Pioneers for the 2024 season.

Aokuso joined the Willetton Tigers of the NBL1 West for the 2025 season. On 25 April 2025, she recorded a triple-double with 20 points, 12 rebounds and 13 assists in a 94–56 win over the Kalamunda Eastern Suns. On 31 May, she recorded another triple-double with 14 points, 19 rebounds and 10 assists in 104–73 loss to the Cockburn Cougars. On 14 June, she recorded another triple-double with 27 points, 20 rebounds and 14 assists in a 92–84 overtime win over the East Perth Eagles. On 20 June, she scored 45 points in a 92–88 win over the Lakeside Lightning. She was named to the All-NBL1 West First Team.

Aokuso joined the Melbourne Tigers for the 2026 NBL1 South season, returning to the team for a second stint. She parted ways with the Tigers mid season.

== National team career ==
Aokuso made her international debut for the Gems at the 2016 FIBA Under-18 Oceania Championship in Suva, Fiji. Australia would take home the gold and Aokuso herself was named most valuable player of the gold medal game. Aokuso would then go on to represent the Gems at the 2017 Under-19 World Cup in Italy the following year, where they finished in sixth place overall.

In April 2019, Aokuso was named to her first ever Opals squad and attended her first team camp on the Gold Coast. Aokuso was then named to the Opals selection camp in Phoenix, Arizona ahead of the 2019 FIBA Asia Cup.

In May 2025, Aokuso was named in the Opals squad for the 2025 FIBA Women's Asia Cup in China. She helped the Opals win gold.

In July 2026, Aokuso was named in the final Opals squad for the 2026 FIBA Women's Basketball World Cup.

== Personal life ==
Aokuso has a Samoan background and comes from a big Samoan family.
