= Kelsey Griffin =

American-Australian basketball player (born 1987)

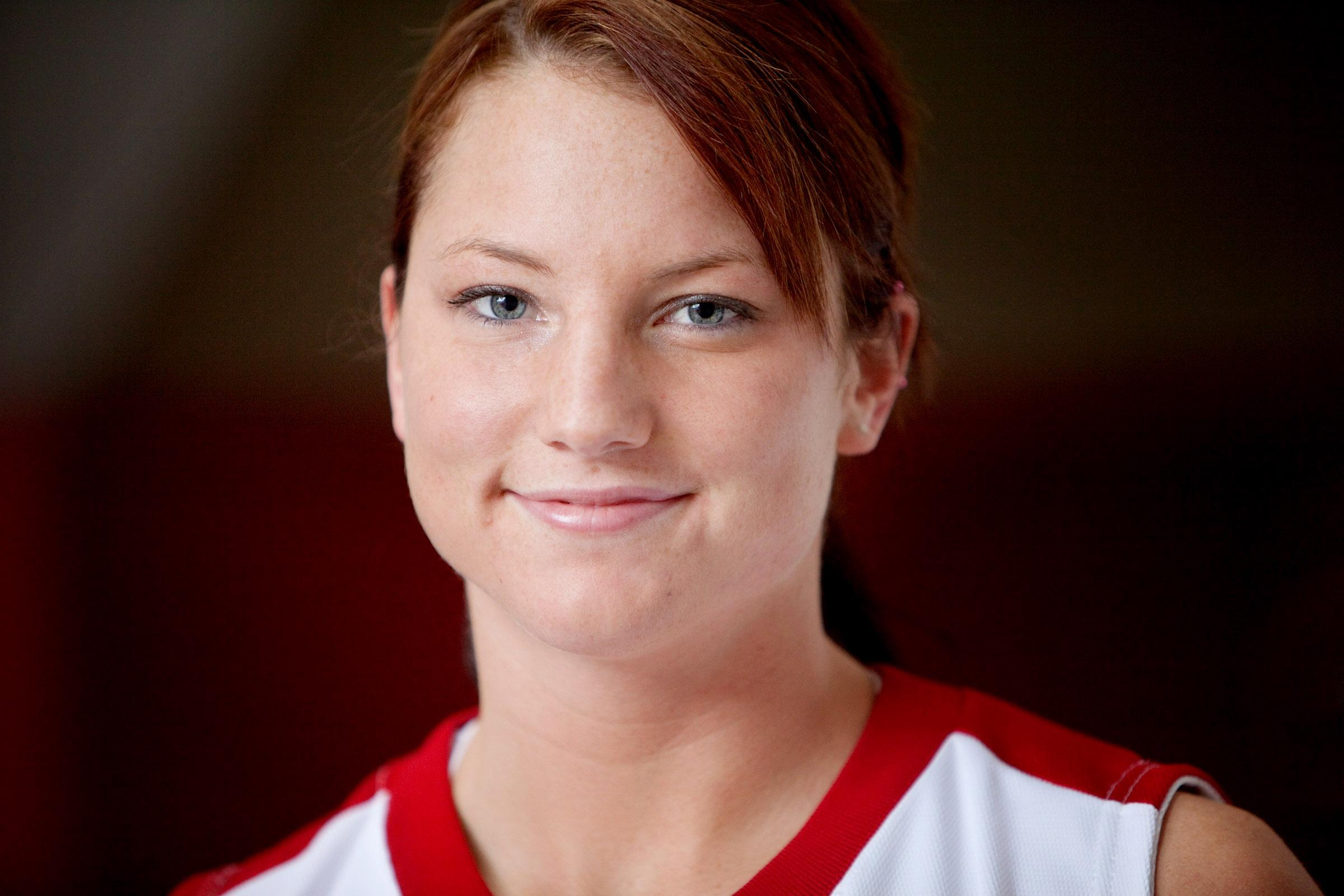

Personal information
- Born: July 2, 1987 (age 39) Anchorage, Alaska, U.S.
- Listed height: 6 ft 2 in (1.88 m)
- Listed weight: 179 lb (81 kg)

Career information
- High school: Chugiak (Chugiak, Alaska)
- College: Nebraska (2005–2010)
- WNBA draft: 2010: 1st round, 3rd overall pick
- Drafted by: Minnesota Lynx
- Playing career: 2010–present
- Position: Forward

Career history
- 2010–2014: Connecticut Sun
- 2010–2011: Pecs 2010
- 2011–2012: Maccabi Ramat Hen
- 2012–2018: Bendigo Spirit
- 2018–2022: Canberra Capitals
- 2022–present: Bendigo Spirit

Career highlights
- 5× WNBL champion (2013, 2014, 2019, 2020, 2025); 3× WNBL Grand Final MVP (2013, 2014, 2019); WNBL Most Valuable Player (2019); 3× All-WNBL First Team (2015, 2016, 2019); 3× All-WNBL Second Team (2022, 2025, 2026); WNBL Defensive Player of the Year (2015); FIBA Asia Cup Most Valuable Player (2017); Senior CLASS Award (2010); All-American – USBWA, State Farm Coaches' (2010); First-team All-American – AP (2010); Big 12 Player of the Year (2010); Big 12 All-Defensive Team (2010); 3× First-team All-Big 12 (2007, 2008, 2010); Big 12 All-Freshman Team (2006); No. 23 retired by Nebraska Cornhuskers
- Stats at WNBA.com
- Stats at Basketball Reference
Medals
Basketball
Representing Australia
Commonwealth Games
Gold medal – first place	2018 Gold Coast
FIBA Asia Cup
Silver medal – second place	2017 India

Kelsey Michelle Griffin (born July 2, 1987) is an American-Australian professional women's basketball player. She was drafted 3rd overall in the 2010 WNBA draft. Griffin played college basketball with the Nebraska Cornhuskers. Griffin was named to many All-America teams and was the winner of the Lowe's Senior CLASS Award. Griffin is currently playing for the Bendigo Spirit in the Australian WNBL. Having obtained Australian citizenship in November 2015, Griffin pledged her allegiance to Australia before the 2016 Summer Olympics in Rio de Janeiro.

== Early life ==
Griffin was born at Providence Hospital in Anchorage, Alaska on July 2, 1987, to Jim and Jan Griffin. Growing up mostly in nearby Eagle River, Griffin attended Chugiak High School.

== College ==
Griffin attended Nebraska for five years. She injured an ankle in the summer of 2008. After not being able to practice for 14 weeks, the decision was made to opt for surgery, so she miss the entire 2008–2009 season and was granted a redshirt season.

== Career statistics ==
Legend
GP	Games played	GS	Games started	MPG	Minutes per game	RPG	Rebounds per game
APG	Assists per game	SPG	Steals per game	BPG	Blocks per game	PPG	Points per game
TO	Turnovers per game	FG%	Field-goal percentage	3P%	3-point field-goal percentage	FT%	Free-throw percentage
**Bold**	Career best	°	League leader

=== WNBA ===
==== Regular season ====
Year	Team	GP	GS	MPG	FG%	3P%	FT%	RPG	APG	SPG	BPG	TO	PPG
2010	Connecticut	**34**	19	20.0	35.0	27.1	**77.4**	4.7	**1.1**	0.7	0.5	1.3	4.4
2011	Connecticut	**34**	2	13.0	35.7	16.7	73.1	3.1	0.5	0.7	0.3	**0.4**	3.6
2012	Connecticut	31	6	12.1	34.3	20.0	70.6	2.9	0.5	0.6	0.3	0.9	3.1
2013	Connecticut	**34**	**34**	**25.4**	**44.3**	**30.8**	73.3	5.0	0.9	1.2	**0.7**	1.0	**8.7**
2014	Connecticut	31	10	19.2	32.7	26.7	70.6	**5.1**	0.8	**1.3**	0.5	0.6	4.4
**Career**	5 years, 1 team	164	71	18.0	37.6	25.6	73.4	4.2	0.8	0.9	0.5	0.8	4.9

==== Playoffs ====
Year	Team	GP	GS	MPG	FG%	3P%	FT%	RPG	APG	SPG	BPG	TO	PPG
2011	Connecticut	**2**	0	**8.0**	**20.0**	0.0	**50.0**	0.0	0.0	0.0	**0.5**	0.5	**1.5**
2012	Connecticut	1	0	4.0	0.0	0.0	0.0	**1.0**	**1.0**	0.0	0.0	**0.0**	0.0
**Career**	2 years, 1 team	3	0	6.7	12.5	0.0	50.0	0.3	0.3	0.0	0.3	0.3	1.0

=== College ===
Year	Team	GP	Points	FG%	3P%	FT%	RPG	APG	SPG	BPG	PPG
2005–06	Nebraska	32	424	54.1	**25.0**	69.5	6.0	0.9	1.3	0.8	13.3
2006–07	Nebraska	32	480	54.6	11.1	72.3	8.3	1.1	1.1	0.6	15.0
2007–08	Nebraska	29	444	53.6	14.3	72.2	7.2	1.0	1.4	**0.9**	15.3
2008–09	Nebraska	Did not play due to injury (redshirt)									
2009–10	Nebraska	**34**	**685**	**59.6**	**25.0**	**75.6**	**10.4**	**1.9**	**1.8**	0.8	**20.1**
**Career**		127	2033	55.8	20.5	72.7	8.0	1.2	1.4	0.7	16.0

== Professional career ==
=== WNBA ===
The Minnesota Lynx had the third pick of the 2010 draft and selected Griffin. As she was about to pose for a picture with a Lynx jersey and WNBA President Donna Orender, she was traded to the Connecticut Sun for future draft picks. In her rookie season for the Sun, Griffin averaged 4.4 points and 4.7 rebounds and was able to earn a spot on the WNBA All Rookie Team.

=== Europe ===
Griffin played for Pécs 2010, a professional basketball team in Pécs, Hungary, playing in the Hungarian A league, one of the premier leagues in EuroBasketball. She led the team to a 23–1 record, which earned an entry in the championship series.

=== Australia ===
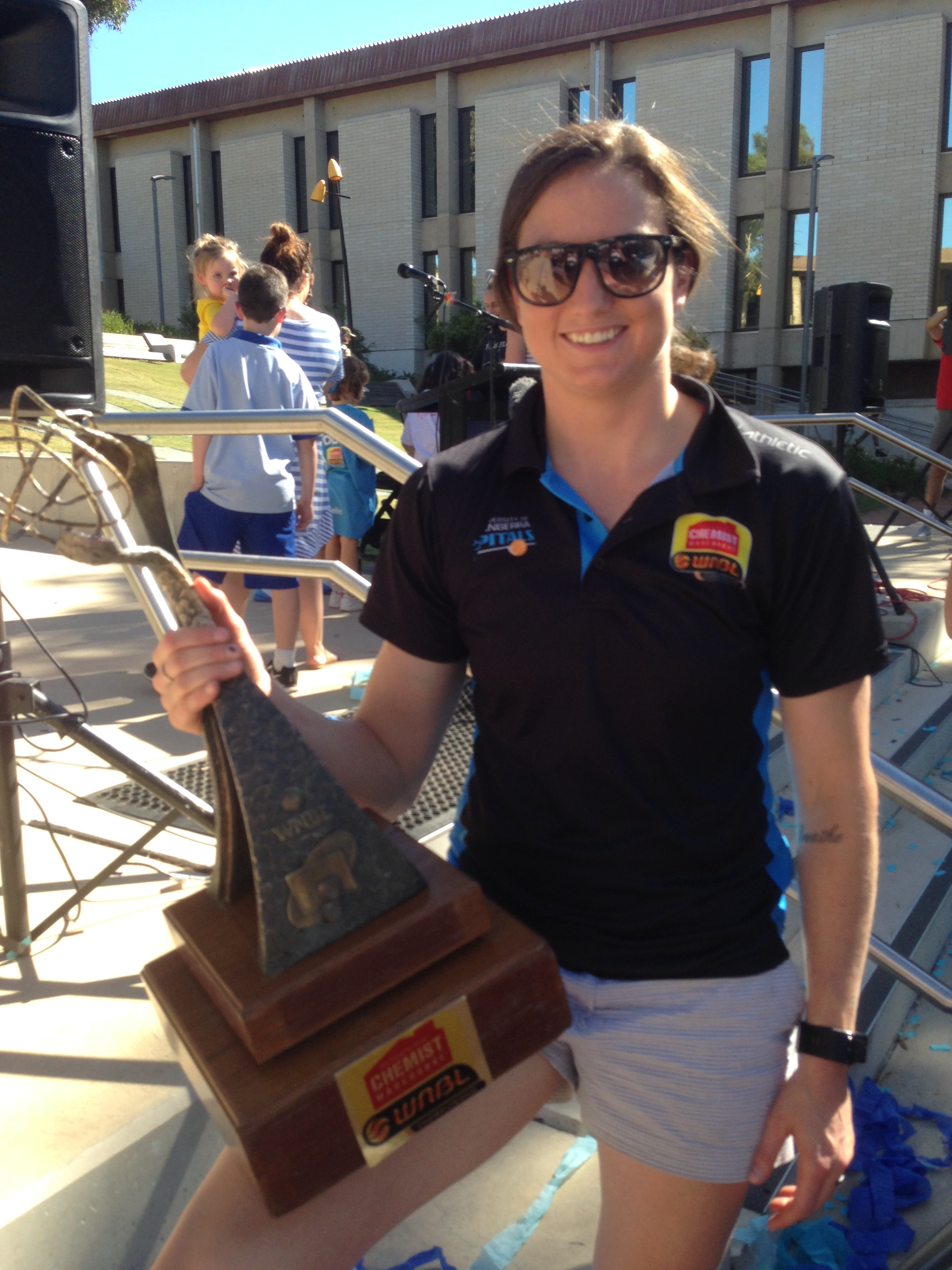
Griffin holds the 2018/19 WNBL trophy

Griffin signed with the Bendigo Spirit for the 2012/13 Australian Women's National Basketball League (WNBL). Due to WNBA commitments, Griffin did not join the Spirit until six rounds into the season. Once cleared to play, she made an instant impact for Bendigo, averaging 16.5 points, 8.6 rebounds per game. Griffin was instrumental in Bendigo's WNBL championship victory, claiming grand final MVP honours after scoring 20 points and collecting 11 rebounds. Despite missing close to a third of the season, Griffin finished sixth overall in the WNBL's end of season league MVP voting.

In the 2024–25 WNBL season, Griffin helped the Bendigo Spirit win the championship, collecting her fifth WNBL title.

== Awards and honors ==
- 2010—Lowe's Senior CLASS Award
- 2010—WBCA First-Team All-American
- 2010—AP First-Team All-American
- 2010—USBWA First-Team All-American
- 2010—Wooden First-Team All-American
- 2010—Big 12 Player of the Year
- 2013—WNBL Grand Final Most Valuable Player
- 2013—WNBL Champion
- 2014—WNBL Grand Final Most Valuable Player
- 2014—WNBL Champion
- 2019—WNBL Grand Final Most Valuable Player
- 2019—WNBL Champion
- 2019—WNBL MVP
- 2020—WNBL Champion
- 2025—WNBL Champion
