= Cairns Pop-Up Arena =

Sports arena in Cairns, Australia

- The Snagpit
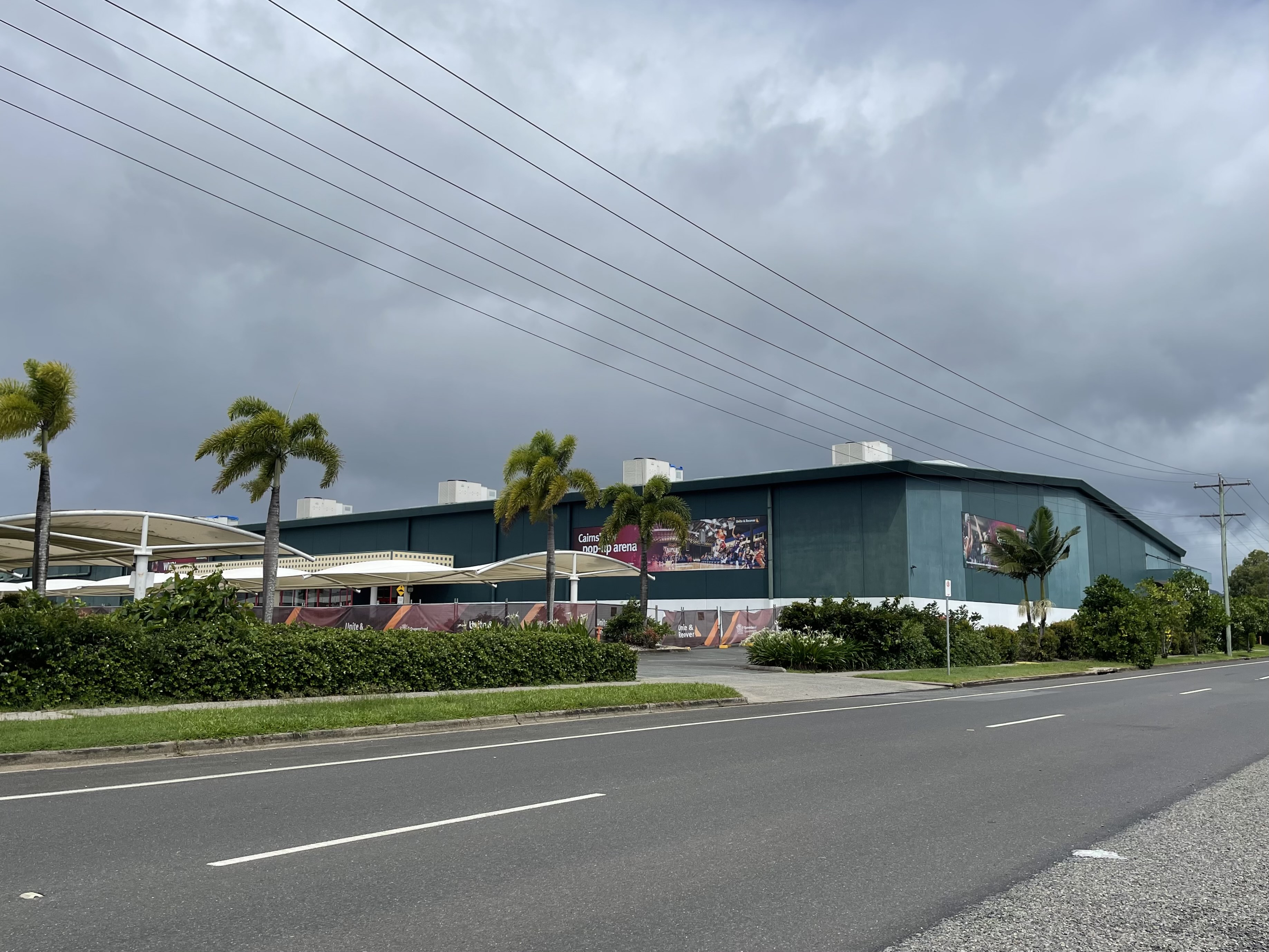
- Cairns Pop-Up Arena from Fearnley Street in January 2021
- Interactive map of Cairns Pop-Up Arena
- Location: Cnr Spence & Fearnley Street, Cairns, Queensland
- Coordinates: 16°55′56″S 145°46′7″E
- Owner: Queensland Government
- Capacity: 2,000
- Record attendance: 1,945 – 28 March 2021 Cairns Taipans vs Adelaide 36ers (NBL)

Construction
- Groundbreaking: 2020
- Opened: 2020
- Closed: 2021

Tenants
- Cairns Taipans (NBL) (2020-2021); South East Melbourne Phoenix (NBL) (2021); Suncorp Super Netball (2020); WNBL (2020)

The Cairns Pop-Up Arena was a sports arena in Cairns, Queensland, Australia. The arena was the temporary host of the Cairns Taipans and the South East Melbourne Phoenix, whilst the Cairns Convention Centre underwent a redevelopment.

== Description ==
The arena had a floor space of 6,500 square metres (70,000 sq ft) on a 4.8-hectare (12-acre) site just outside Cairns City. As a former Bunnings building it only contained one hall, which was fitted with grandstand seating, air conditioning, broadcast lighting, video scoreboards, a public address system, change room facilities, public amenities and catering facilities.

== History ==
Following months of debate about the future of the Cairns Taipans in Cairns due to the delay of upgrades to the Cairns Convention Centre and no other suitable venue ready, on 10 July 2020 Queensland Government Sports Minister Mick de Brenni unveiled plans to upgrade the former Bunnings building on the corner of Spence and Fearnley Streets which had been vacant since 2015.

== Events ==
On 10 July 2020, when de Brenni unveiled the plans to upgrade the former Bunnings building he announced that the Cairns Taipans were going to use the stadium until the Cairns Convention Centre upgrades are completed. The stadium is used by the club for training and pre-season games, as an alternative to Cairns Basketball Stadium.

On 15 September 2020, Suncorp Super Netball announced it would be hosting three games at the venue for the league's Indigenous round.

On 9 October 2020, the Women's National Basketball League announced that they would start their 2020–21 season in a North Queensland hub, with the Cairns Pop-Up Arena to host 20 games.

On 10 February 2021, it was announced that the New Zealand Tall Blacks would be hosting a 2021 FIBA Asia Cup qualifier against the Australian Boomers on 20 February 2021. The Boomers won the game 81–52.

NBL schedule changes due to COVID-19 induced border closures forced the South East Melbourne Phoenix to host games against the Cairns Taipans and the Brisbane Bullets at the arena.

== Closure and transition ==
In October 2021, following the completion of upgrades to the Convention Centre, the Queensland Government announced that the Cairns Pop-Up Arena would be converted into a film studio for Screen Queensland. The transition of the arena into a film studio costs $6.8 million and will be completed by mid-2022.
