= Townsville Stadium =

Sports venue in Annandale, Queensland, Australia

- Location: Murray Lyons Crescent, Annandale, Queensland, 4814
- Owner: City of Townsville
- Operator: City of Townsville
- Capacity: 2,500
- Surface: Hardwood

Construction
- Groundbreaking: 2010
- Opened: 2011

Tenants
- Townsville Fire (WNBL) (2011–2021); Townsville Crocodiles (NBL) (2014–2015)

The Townsville Stadium (previously Townsville RSL Stadium) is a multi-purpose indoor venue located at the Murray Sporting Complex in Annandale, Queensland. The facility features an international standard wooden sports floor, multi-purpose function rooms, a public gym, stadium administration and the Townsville City Council. The Stadium, which opened in 2011, is owned and operated by the City of Townsville, has a total spectator capacity of 2,500 (1,700 seated). The stadium can also host other sports such as netball, volleyball and badminton, and can also be used for indoor events such as expos, conventions, conferences or dinners.

Between 2011 and 2021, the stadium was home to the Townsville Fire of the Women's National Basketball League. In the 2014–15 NBL season, the stadium was home to the Townsville Crocodiles.

The largest attendance at the venue was recorded on 27 July 2011 for a women's international basketball game when the Australian Opals played China in front of 2,200 fans.

In July 2022, the stadium hosted the Wheelchair State of Origin match between the Queensland and New South Wales wheelchair rugby league teams.
