= List of 2016–17 WNBL team rosters =

2016–17 WNBL season
- League: Women's National Basketball League
- Sport: Basketball
- Duration: 7 October 2016 – March 2017
- Number of teams: 8

Regular season

Finals

WNBL seasons
- ← 2015–16 2017–18 →

Below is a list of the rosters for the 2016–17 WNBL season.

== Rosters ==
=== Adelaide Lightning ===
2016–17 Adelaide Lightning roster
Players
Coaches

Pos.	No.	Nat.	Name	Ht.
F	4	(Australia)	Ciabattoni, Alex	1.75 m (5 ft 9 in)
G	5	(New Zealand)	Hunter, Jordan	1.72 m (5 ft 8 in)
G	6	(Australia)	McKay, Shannon	1.69 m (5 ft 7 in)
G	7	(Australia)	Elsworthy, Sarah	1.71 m (5 ft 7 in)
G/F	8	(Australia)	Hatchard, Anne	1.75 m (5 ft 9 in)
F	10	(Australia)	Hodges, Laura (C)	1.88 m (6 ft 2 in)
F	11	(Australia)	Good, Jessica	1.85 m (6 ft 1 in)
G/F	13	(Australia)	Nagy, Ieva	1.75 m (5 ft 9 in)
F/C	14	(Australia)	Brook, Chelsea	1.88 m (6 ft 2 in)
F	15	(Australia)	Roberts, Tayla	1.91 m (6 ft 3 in)
F	21	(Australia)	McKendrick, Mollie	1.82 m (6 ft 0 in)
G	22	(United States)	Logic, Samantha	1.75 m (5 ft 9 in)
C	42	(United States)	Planeta, Colleen	1.88 m (6 ft 2 in)

Head coach

- (Australia) Chris Lucas

Assistant coach(es)

- (Australia) Marcus Wong

Legend

- (C) Team captain
- (DP) Development player
- (I) Import player
- Injured

- Roster
Updated: 6 October 2016

=== Bendigo Spirit ===
2016–17 Bendigo Spirit roster
Players
Coaches

Pos.	No.	Nat.	Name	Ht.
G	4	(United States)	Dietrick, Blake	1.78 m (5 ft 10 in)
G	5	(Australia)	Wilson, Andrea	1.72 m (5 ft 8 in)
G	6	(Australia)	Harrington, Kerryn	1.72 m (5 ft 8 in)
G	7	(Australia)	Oliver, Heather	1.78 m (5 ft 10 in)
F	8	(Canada)	Raincock-Ekunwe, Nayo	1.88 m (6 ft 2 in)
F	11	(Australia)	Spencer, Ashleigh	1.81 m (5 ft 11 in)
F	12	(Australia)	Payne, Nadeen	1.88 m (6 ft 2 in)
G/F	15	(Australia)	Matthews, Molly	1.82 m (6 ft 0 in)
C	20	(Australia)	Richards, Gabrielle	1.88 m (6 ft 2 in)
G/F	21	(Australia)	Rolph, Ebony	1.82 m (6 ft 0 in)
G	22	(Australia)	Karaitiana, Ashleigh	1.83 m (6 ft 0 in)
F	23	(Australia)	Griffin, Kelsey (C)	1.88 m (6 ft 2 in)
G	24	(Australia)	Chalmers, Jane	1.62 m (5 ft 4 in)

Head coach

- (Australia) Simon Pritchard

Assistant coach(es)

- (Australia) David Flint

Legend

- (C) Team captain
- (DP) Development player
- (I) Import player
- Injured

- Roster
Updated: 27 November 2016

=== Canberra Capitals ===
2016–17 Canberra Capitals roster
Players
Coaches

Pos.	No.	Nat.	Name	Ht.
F	3	(United States)	Ruef, Mikaela	1.90 m (6 ft 3 in)
G	4	(United States)	Adams, Janelle	1.75 m (5 ft 9 in)
G	5	(Australia)	Mansfield, Lauren	1.70 m (5 ft 7 in)
G	6	(Australia)	Coddington, Alice	1.78 m (5 ft 10 in)
F	7	(Australia)	Bairstow, Stephanie	1.88 m (6 ft 2 in)
G/F	8	(Australia)	Wilson, Carly (C)	1.89 m (6 ft 2 in)
G	9	(Australia)	Bourne, Callie	1.77 m (5 ft 10 in)
G	10	(Australia)	Gaze, Kate	1.73 m (5 ft 8 in)
C	12	(Australia)	Tolo, Marianna (C)	1.96 m (6 ft 5 in)
G	13	(Australia)	Wehrung, Abigail	1.78 m (5 ft 10 in)
F	14	(Australia)	Bourne, Isabelle	1.86 m (6 ft 1 in)
F	21	(Australia)	Froling, Keely	1.88 m (6 ft 2 in)
G/F	24	(United States)	Gwathmey, Jazmon	1.88 m (6 ft 2 in)

Head coach

- (Australia) Paul Goriss

Assistant coach(es)

- (Australia) Reece Potter

Legend

- (C) Team captain
- (DP) Development player
- (I) Import player
- Injured

- Roster
Updated: 27 November 2016

=== Dandenong Rangers ===
2016–17 Dandenong Rangers roster
Players
Coaches

Pos.	No.	Nat.	Name	Ht.
G	5	(Australia)	Clydesdale, Aimie	1.78 m (5 ft 10 in)
G	6	(Australia)	Antoniadou, Rachel	1.73 m (5 ft 8 in)
G	7	(Australia)	Whatman, Briahna	1.69 m (5 ft 7 in)
G	8	(Australia)	Cumming, Stephanie (C)	1.78 m (5 ft 10 in)
C	9	(Australia)	Kennedy, Jacinta	1.87 m (6 ft 2 in)
F	10	(Australia)	Bibby, Chloe	1.85 m (6 ft 1 in)
C	11	(Australia)	Scherf, Lauren	1.96 m (6 ft 5 in)
G	14	(Australia)	Todhunter, Amelia	1.69 m (5 ft 7 in)
F	15	(Australia)	Blicavs, Sara	1.89 m (6 ft 2 in)
G	21	(United States)	Novosel, Natalie	1.80 m (5 ft 11 in)
G/F	22	(Australia)	Fadljevic, Rosemary	1.84 m (6 ft 0 in)
F	33	(United States)	Malott, Ally	1.90 m (6 ft 3 in)

Head coach

- (Australia) Larissa Anderson

Assistant coach(es)

- (Australia) James Anderson
- (Australia) Michelle Brogan
- (Australia) John White

Legend

- (C) Team captain
- (DP) Development player
- (I) Import player
- Injured

- Roster
Updated: 27 November 2016

=== Melbourne Boomers ===
2016–17 Melbourne Boomers roster
Players
Coaches

Pos.	No.	Nat.	Name	Ht.
F	1	(Australia)	Cunningham, Tegan	1.80 m (5 ft 11 in)
F	2	(New Zealand)	Bygate, Jessica	1.86 m (6 ft 1 in)
G	3	(United States)	Smart, Brittany	1.75 m (5 ft 9 in)
G	4	(Australia)	Cole, Rebecca	1.78 m (5 ft 10 in)
G	5	(Australia)	Burton, Kasey	1.84 m (6 ft 0 in)
G	6	(Australia)	Ott, Rebecca	1.84 m (6 ft 0 in)
F	11	(Australia)	Thompson, Olivia	1.88 m (6 ft 2 in)
G	14	(Australia)	Conti, Monique	1.65 m (5 ft 5 in)
G	23	(Australia)	Garrick, Madeleine	1.79 m (5 ft 10 in)
F	24	(Australia)	Bowen, Kelly	1.85 m (6 ft 1 in)
F	32	(Canada)	Keane, Kalisha	1.86 m (6 ft 1 in)
G/F	41	(Australia)	Kunek, Alice (C)	1.87 m (6 ft 2 in)

Head coach

- (Australia) Guy Molloy

Assistant coach(es)

- (Australia) Al McAughtry

Legend

- (C) Team captain
- (DP) Development player
- (I) Import player
- Injured

- Roster
Updated: 27 November 2016

=== Perth Lynx ===
2016–17 Perth Lynx roster
Players
Coaches

Pos.	No.	Nat.	Name	Ht.
G	1	(Australia)	Lavey, Tessa (C)	1.72 m (5 ft 8 in)
G	7	(New Zealand)	Edmondson, Antonia	1.81 m (5 ft 11 in)
F/C	10	(Australia)	Burton, Natalie	1.94 m (6 ft 4 in)
F	11	(Australia)	Mijović, Carley	1.96 m (6 ft 5 in)
F/C	25	(Australia)	Grant, Ashleigh	1.87 m (6 ft 2 in)
G	30	(United States)	Butler, Brianna	1.80 m (5 ft 11 in)
G/F	32	(United States)	Whitcomb, Sami	1.78 m (5 ft 10 in)
G	35	(Australia)	Phillips, Tenaya	1.78 m (5 ft 10 in)
F	40	(United States)	Lee, Kisha	1.82 m (6 ft 0 in)
C	44	(Canada)	Hamblin, Ruth	1.98 m (6 ft 6 in)

Head coach

- (Australia) Andy Stewart

Assistant coach(es)

- (Australia) Ryan Petrik
- (Australia) Tom Knowles

Legend

- (C) Team captain
- (DP) Development player
- (I) Import player
- Injured

- Roster
Updated: 27 November 2016

=== Sydney Uni Flames ===
2016–17 Sydney Uni Flames roster
Players
Coaches

Pos.	No.	Nat.	Name	Ht.
G	1	(Australia)	Nicholson, Lauren	1.80 m (5 ft 11 in)
G	3	(Australia)	Moffatt, Hayley	1.76 m (5 ft 9 in)
G	4	(Australia)	Tupaea, Tahlia	1.75 m (5 ft 9 in)
C	5	(United States)	Hamson, Jennifer	2.00 m (6 ft 7 in)
G	6	(Australia)	Mitchell, Leilani	1.66 m (5 ft 5 in)
G	7	(Australia)	Wilson, Alex	1.80 m (5 ft 11 in)
F	8	(Australia)	Greaves, Shanae	1.85 m (6 ft 1 in)
F	11	(Australia)	Boag, Carly	1.88 m (6 ft 2 in)
G	12	(Australia)	Snell, Belinda (C)	1.80 m (5 ft 11 in)
F	14	(Australia)	McSpadden, Lara	1.94 m (6 ft 4 in)
F	31	(United States)	Taylor, Asia	1.88 m (6 ft 2 in)
G	33	(Australia)	McLean, Cassidy	1.80 m (5 ft 11 in)
G	44	(Australia)	Graham, Sarah	1.63 m (5 ft 4 in)

Head coach

- (Australia) Cheryl Chambers

Assistant coach(es)

- (Australia) Darren Allie
- (Australia) Karen Dalton

Legend

- (C) Team captain
- (DP) Development player
- (I) Import player
- Injured

- Roster
Updated: 27 November 2016

=== Townsville Fire ===
2016–17 Townsville Fire roster
Players
Coaches

Pos.	No.	Nat.	Name	Ht.
G	4	(United States)	Cloud, Natasha	1.83 m (6 ft 0 in)
G	6	(Australia)	Walsh, Ainsley	1.72 m (5 ft 8 in)
G	7	(Australia)	Andrews, Haylee	1.75 m (5 ft 9 in)
C	8	(Australia)	Batkovic, Suzy (C)	1.93 m (6 ft 4 in)
G/F	10	(Australia)	Murray, Mia	1.81 m (5 ft 11 in)
F	12	(Australia)	Zelenka, Jacqui	1.82 m (6 ft 0 in)
F	14	(Australia)	Garbin, Darcee	1.88 m (6 ft 2 in)
G/F	15	(United States)	Kame, Amy	1.83 m (6 ft 0 in)
G/F	20	(New Zealand)	Paalvast, Chevannah	1.91 m (6 ft 3 in)
G	22	(Australia)	Wilson, Kelly	1.70 m (5 ft 7 in)
G	32	(New Zealand)	Cocks, Micaela	1.74 m (5 ft 9 in)
F	35	(United States)	Standish, Kayla	1.88 m (6 ft 2 in)

Head coach

- (Australia) Claudia Brassard

Assistant coach(es)

- (Australia) Mark Wrobel

Legend

- (C) Team captain
- (DP) Development player
- (I) Import player
- Injured

- Roster
Updated: 27 November 2016
