= List of 2017–18 WNBL team rosters =

2017–18 WNBL season
- League: Women's National Basketball League
- Sport: Basketball
- Duration: October 2017 – March 2018
- Teams: 8

Regular season

Finals

WNBL seasons
- ← 2016–17 2018–19 →

Below is a list of the rosters for the 2017–18 WNBL season.

== Rosters ==
=== Adelaide Lightning ===
2017–18 Adelaide Lightning roster
Players
Coaches

Pos.	No.	Nat.	Name	Ht.
G	1	(Australia)	Nicholson, Lauren	1.80 m (5 ft 11 in)
F/C	4	(Australia)	Bishop, Abby (C)	1.89 m (6 ft 2 in)
G	5	(Australia)	Clydesdale, Aimie	1.78 m (5 ft 10 in)
G	6	(Australia)	McKay, Shannon	1.69 m (5 ft 7 in)
G	7	(Australia)	Elsworthy, Sarah	1.71 m (5 ft 7 in)
F/C	8	(Australia)	Brook, Chelsea	1.88 m (6 ft 2 in)
G	9	(Australia)	Panousis, Vanessa	1.70 m (5 ft 7 in)
F	10	(Australia)	Hodges, Laura	1.88 m (6 ft 2 in)
G/F	12	(Australia)	Good, Jessica	1.85 m (6 ft 1 in)
G	21	(United States)	Novosel, Natalie (injured)	1.80 m (5 ft 11 in)
G	35	(Australia)	Seekamp, Nicole	1.78 m (5 ft 10 in)
F	42	(United States)	Planeta, Colleen	1.88 m (6 ft 2 in)
C	44	(Canada)	Hamblin, Ruth	1.98 m (6 ft 6 in)

Head coach

- (Australia) Chris Lucas

Assistant coach(es)

- (Australia) Jason Chainey
- (Australia) Rachael Sporn
- (Australia) Marcus Wong

Legend

- (C) Team captain
- (DP) Development player
- (I) Import player
- Injured

- Roster
Updated: 21 December 2017

=== Bendigo Spirit ===
2017–18 Bendigo Spirit roster
Players
Coaches

Pos.	No.	Nat.	Name	Ht.
G	1	(United States)	Banham, Rachel	1.75 m (5 ft 9 in)
G	3	(Australia)	Tessari, Kara	1.65 m (5 ft 5 in)
G	7	(Australia)	Oliver, Heather	1.78 m (5 ft 10 in)
F	11	(Australia)	Spencer, Ashleigh	1.83 m (6 ft 0 in)
F	12	(Australia)	Payne, Nadeen	1.88 m (6 ft 2 in)
F	20	(Australia)	Richards, Gabrielle	1.88 m (6 ft 2 in)
F	21	(Australia)	Rolph, Ebony	1.80 m (5 ft 11 in)
F	22	(New Zealand)	Karaitiana, Ashleigh	1.80 m (5 ft 11 in)
F	23	(Australia)	Griffin, Kelsey (C)	1.88 m (6 ft 2 in)
G/F	44	(United States)	Laney, Betnijah	1.80 m (5 ft 11 in)

Head coach

- (Australia) Simon Pritchard

Assistant coach(es)

- (Australia) David Flint
- (Australia) Megan Moody

Legend

- (C) Team captain
- (DP) Development player
- (I) Import player
- Injured

- Roster
Updated: 28 September 2017

=== Canberra Capitals ===
2017–18 Canberra Capitals roster
Players
Coaches

Pos.	No.	Nat.	Name	Ht.
F	3	(United States)	Bass, Mistie	1.93 m (6 ft 4 in)
F	5	(Australia)	Magbegor, Eziyoda	1.93 m (6 ft 4 in)
G	7	(Australia)	Hurst, Natalie (C)	1.63 m (5 ft 4 in)
G	9	(Australia)	Bourne, Callie	1.80 m (5 ft 11 in)
G	10	(Australia)	Gaze, Kate	1.78 m (5 ft 10 in)
F	12	(Australia)	Jarry, Rachel	1.85 m (6 ft 1 in)
G	13	(Australia)	Wehrung, Abigail	1.78 m (5 ft 10 in)
G	20	(New Zealand)	Paalvast, Chevannah	1.80 m (5 ft 11 in)
F	21	(Australia)	Froling, Keely	1.88 m (6 ft 2 in)
C	22	(Australia)	Scherf, Lauren	1.96 m (6 ft 5 in)
G	23	(Australia)	Rocci, Maddison	1.67 m (5 ft 6 in)
F	35	(United States)	Hooper, Jordan	1.88 m (6 ft 2 in)

Head coach

- (Australia) Paul Goriss

Assistant coach(es)

- (Australia) Peta Sinclair
- (Australia) Carly Wilson

Legend

- (C) Team captain
- (DP) Development player
- (I) Import player
- Injured

- Roster
Updated: 28 September 2017

=== Dandenong Rangers ===
2017–18 Dandenong Rangers roster
Players
Coaches

Pos.	No.	Nat.	Name	Ht.
F	2	(United States)	Pedersen, Kayla	1.93 m (6 ft 4 in)
G	5	(Australia)	Lavey, Tessa	1.72 m (5 ft 8 in)
G	6	(Australia)	Antoniadou, Rachel	1.73 m (5 ft 8 in)
F	7	(Australia)	Pizzey, Rebecca	1.90 m (6 ft 3 in)
G	8	(Australia)	Blicavs, Stephanie (C)	1.78 m (5 ft 10 in)
G	9	(Spain)	Palau, Laia	1.80 m (5 ft 11 in)
F	10	(Australia)	Rowe, Kiera	1.80 m (5 ft 11 in)
F	11	(Australia)	Mijović, Carley	1.96 m (6 ft 5 in)
G	14	(Australia)	Todhunter, Amelia	1.69 m (5 ft 7 in)
F	15	(Australia)	Blicavs, Sara	1.89 m (6 ft 2 in)
C	22	(Australia)	Roberts, Tayla	1.91 m (6 ft 3 in)

Head coach

- (Australia) Larissa Anderson

Assistant coach(es)

- (New Zealand) Kennedy Kereama
- (Australia) Samantha Richards
- (Australia) John White

Legend

- (C) Team captain
- (DP) Development player
- (I) Import player
- Injured

- Roster
Updated: 4 October 2017

=== Melbourne Boomers ===
2017–18 Melbourne Boomers roster
Players
Coaches

Pos.	No.	Nat.	Name	Ht.
C	2	(Australia)	Tomlinson, Louella	1.93 m (6 ft 4 in)
G	3	(United States)	Smart, Brittany	1.75 m (5 ft 9 in)
G	4	(Australia)	Cole, Rebecca	1.78 m (5 ft 10 in)
G	6	(Australia)	Ott, Rebecca	1.82 m (6 ft 0 in)
C	8	(Australia)	Cambage, Liz	2.03 m (6 ft 8 in)
G/F	11	(Australia)	O'Hea, Jenna (C)	1.87 m (6 ft 2 in)
G	14	(Australia)	Conti, Monique	1.65 m (5 ft 5 in)
F	15	(Australia)	Grant, Ashleigh	1.88 m (6 ft 2 in)
G	23	(Australia)	Garrick, Madeleine	1.79 m (5 ft 10 in)
F	32	(New Zealand)	Purcell, Kalani	1.87 m (6 ft 2 in)
C	50	(United States)	Duever, Courtney	1.85 m (6 ft 1 in)

Head coach

- (Australia) Guy Molloy

Assistant coach(es)

- (Australia) Katrina Hibbert
- (Australia) Paul Flynn

Legend

- (C) Team captain
- (DP) Development player
- (I) Import player
- Injured

- Roster
Updated: 4 October 2017

=== Perth Lynx ===
Perth Lynx roster
Players
Coaches

Pos.	No.	Nat.	Name	Ht.
G	1	(United States)	Williams, Courtney	1.73 m (5 ft 8 in)
C	3	(United States)	Dowe, Amanda	1.93 m (6 ft 4 in)
G	7	(New Zealand)	Farnworth, Antonia (C)	1.81 m (5 ft 11 in)
G/F	8	(Australia)	Ciabattoni, Alex	1.83 m (6 ft 0 in)
F/C	9	(Australia)	Burton, Natalie	1.94 m (6 ft 4 in)
F	10	(Australia)	Kunek, Alice	1.86 m (6 ft 1 in)
F	11	(Australia)	Thompson, Olivia	1.85 m (6 ft 1 in)
F/C	12	(United States)	Standish, Kayla	1.87 m (6 ft 2 in)
G	32	(United States)	Whitcomb, Sami (C)	1.78 m (5 ft 10 in)

Head coach

- (Australia) Andy Stewart

Assistant coach(es)

- (Australia) Ryan Petrik

Legend

- (C) Team captain
- (DP) Development player
- (I) Import player
- Injured

- Roster
Updated: 27 October 2017

=== Sydney Uni Flames ===
2017–18 Sydney Uni Flames roster
Players
Coaches

Pos.	No.	Nat.	Name	Ht.
G	2	(Australia)	Walmsley, Susannah	1.70 m (5 ft 7 in)
G	3	(Australia)	Moffatt, Hayley	1.76 m (5 ft 9 in)
G	4	(Australia)	Tupaea, Tahlia	1.75 m (5 ft 9 in)
C	5	(United States)	Hamson, Jennifer	2.00 m (6 ft 7 in)
F	6	(Australia)	McLean, Cassidy	1.78 m (5 ft 10 in)
G	7	(Australia)	Wilson, Alex	1.80 m (5 ft 11 in)
F	8	(Australia)	Greaves, Shanae	1.85 m (6 ft 1 in)
G	10	(Australia)	Ebzery, Katie-Rae	1.78 m (5 ft 10 in)
F	11	(Australia)	Boag, Carly	1.88 m (6 ft 2 in)
G	12	(Australia)	Snell, Belinda (C)	1.80 m (5 ft 11 in)
F	14	(Australia)	McSpadden, Lara	1.94 m (6 ft 4 in)
F	31	(United States)	Taylor, Asia	1.85 m (6 ft 1 in)
G	44	(Australia)	Graham, Sarah	1.63 m (5 ft 4 in)

Head coach

- (Australia) Cheryl Chambers

Assistant coach(es)

- (Australia) Karen Dalton

Legend

- (C) Team captain
- (DP) Development player
- (I) Import player
- Injured

- Roster
Updated: 4 October 2017

=== Townsville Fire ===
2017–18 Townsville Fire roster
Players
Coaches

Pos.	No.	Nat.	Name	Ht.
SG	1	(United States)	Mincy, Laurin	1.83 m (6 ft 0 in)
PG	6	(Australia)	Donnelly, Mikhaela	1.73 m (5 ft 8 in)
C	8	(Australia)	Batkovic, Suzy (C)	1.94 m (6 ft 4 in)
SF	10	(Australia)	Murray, Mia	1.84 m (6 ft 0 in)
PF	14	(Australia)	Garbin, Darcee	1.88 m (6 ft 2 in)
C	15	(Australia)	Aokuso, Zitina	1.92 m (6 ft 4 in)
SF	21	(Australia)	Whittle, Marena	1.80 m (5 ft 11 in)
PG	22	(Australia)	Wilson, Kelly	1.70 m (5 ft 7 in)
PF	23	(Australia)	George, Cayla	1.93 m (6 ft 4 in)
SG	24	(United States)	Wiese, Sydney	1.83 m (6 ft 0 in)
PG	32	(New Zealand)	Cocks, Micaela	1.74 m (5 ft 9 in)

Head coach

- (Australia) Claudia Brassard

Assistant coach(es)

- (Australia) Peter Crawford
- (Australia) Rachael McCully
- (Australia) Mark Wrobel

Legend

- (C) Team captain
- (DP) Development player
- (I) Import player
- Injured

- Roster
Updated: 4 October 2017

=== Development players ===
Team	Pos.	No.	Nat.	Player	Ht.
Adelaide Lightning					
Bendigo Spirit	G	8	(Australia)	Hurst, Ahlise	1.71 m (5 ft 7 in)
Bendigo Spirit	G	15	(Australia)	Rennie, Jessie	1.70 m (5 ft 7 in)
Bendigo Spirit	F	34	(Australia)	Wild, Maddison	1.90 m (6 ft 3 in)
Canberra Capitals					
Dandenong Rangers					
Melbourne Boomers	G	5	(Australia)	Burton, Kasey	1.84 m (6 ft 0 in)
Melbourne Boomers	G	7	(Australia)	Gould, Cassidy	1.76 m (5 ft 9 in)
Melbourne Boomers	F	9	(Australia)	Kalka, Peri	1.85 m (6 ft 1 in)
Melbourne Boomers	G	12	(Australia)	D'Angelo, Chelsea	1.77 m (5 ft 10 in)
Perth Lynx	G	6	(Australia)	Pirini, Mikayla	1.69 m (5 ft 7 in)
Perth Lynx	G	20	(Australia)	Denehey, Georgia	1.87 m (6 ft 2 in)
Perth Lynx	G	24	(Australia)	Fejo, Tahlia	1.71 m (5 ft 7 in)
Perth Lynx	F	30	(Australia)	Miotti, Isabelle	1.78 m (5 ft 10 in)
Perth Lynx	G/F	33	(United States)	Schwagmeyer, Alison	1.77 (5 ft 10 in)
Perth Lynx	F/C	–	(United States)	Rintala, Jennie	1.88 m (6 ft 2 in)
Sydney Uni Flames	F	–	(Australia)	Hodge, Kimberley	1.82 m (6 ft 0 in)
Sydney Uni Flames	G	–	(Australia)	Matthews, Emily	1.78 m (5 ft 10 in)
Sydney Uni Flames	G	–	(Australia)	O'Hehir, Madeleine	1.79 m (5 ft 10 in)
Townsville Fire	G	3	(Australia)	Goodchild, Miela	1.75 m (5 ft 9 in)
Townsville Fire	G	7	(Australia)	Andrews, Haylee	1.75 m (5 ft 9 in)
