= List of 2018–19 WNBL team rosters =

2018–19 WNBL season
- League: Women's National Basketball League
- Sport: Basketball
- Number of teams: 8

WNBL seasons
- ← 2017–18 2019–20 →

Below is a list of the rosters for the 2018–19 WNBL season.

== Rosters ==
=== Adelaide Lightning ===
2018–19 Adelaide Lightning roster
Players
Coaches

Pos.	No.	Nat.	Name	Ht.
G	1	(Australia)	Nicholson, Lauren	1.80 m (5 ft 11 in)
G/F	3	(Australia)	Taia, Ashley	1.82 m (6 ft 0 in)
G	5	(Australia)	Clydesdale, Aimie	1.78 m (5 ft 10 in)
G	6	(Australia)	Blicavs, Stephanie (C)	1.78 m (5 ft 10 in)
G	7	(Australia)	Elsworthy, Sarah	1.71 m (5 ft 7 in)
F/C	8	(Australia)	Brook, Chelsea	1.88 m (6 ft 2 in)
G	9	(Australia)	Pirini, Mikayla	1.69 m (5 ft 7 in)
F	11	(New Zealand)	Davidson, Penina	1.90 m (6 ft 3 in)
G	12	(United States)	Coffey, Nia	1.85 m (6 ft 1 in)
G	35	(Australia)	Seekamp, Nicole (C)	1.78 m (5 ft 10 in)
C	40	(Canada)	Alexander, Kayla	1.93 m (6 ft 4 in)
F	42	(United States)	Planeta, Colleen	1.88 m (6 ft 2 in)

Head coach

- (Australia) Chris Lucas

Assistant coach(es)

- (Australia) Marcus Wong

Legend

- (C) Team captain
- (DP) Development player
- (I) Import player
- Injured

- Roster
Updated: 13 October 2018

=== Bendigo Spirit ===
2018–19 Bendigo Spirit roster
Players
Coaches

Pos.	No.	Nat.	Name	Ht.
C	2	(Australia)	Tomlinson, Louella	1.93 m (6 ft 4 in)
G	3	(Australia)	Tessari, Kara	1.65 m (5 ft 5 in)
F	6	(Australia)	McLean, Cassidy	1.78 m (5 ft 10 in)
F	12	(Australia)	Payne, Nadeen	1.88 m (6 ft 2 in)
G	13	(Australia)	Wehrung, Abigail	1.78 m (5 ft 10 in)
G	15	(Australia)	Rennie, Jessie	1.75 m (5 ft 9 in)
G	16	(Australia)	Hurst, Natalie (C)	1.63 m (5 ft 4 in)
G/F	21	(Australia)	Whittle, Marena	1.80 m (5 ft 11 in)
F/C	32	(United States)	Tobin, Rebecca	1.95 m (6 ft 5 in)
F	34	(Australia)	Wild, Maddison	1.90 m (6 ft 3 in)
G/F	35	(United States)	Turner, Barbara	1.83 m (6 ft 0 in)

Head coach

- (Australia) Simon Pritchard

Assistant coach(es)

- (Australia) David Flint
- (United Kingdom) Megan Moody

Legend

- (C) Team captain
- (DP) Development player
- (I) Import player
- Injured

- Roster
Updated: 18 November 2018

=== Canberra Capitals ===
2018–19 Canberra Capitals roster
Players
Coaches

Pos.	No.	Nat.	Name	Ht.
F	2	(Australia)	Young, Hannah	1.85 m (6 ft 1 in)
G	4	(Australia)	Wallace, Kristy	1.80 m (5 ft 11 in)
G	5	(Australia)	Mitchell, Leilani	1.65 m (5 ft 5 in)
C	7	(Australia)	Scherf, Lauren	1.96 m (6 ft 5 in)
G	9	(Australia)	Rocci, Maddison	1.68 m (5 ft 6 in)
G	11	(Canada)	Nurse, Kia	1.83 m (6 ft 0 in)
C	12	(Australia)	Tolo, Marianna (C)	1.96 m (6 ft 5 in)
F	21	(Australia)	Froling, Keely	1.88 m (6 ft 2 in)
G	22	(Australia)	Wilson, Kelly	1.70 m (5 ft 7 in)
F	23	(Australia)	Griffin, Kelsey (C)	1.88 m (6 ft 2 in)
F	41	(United States)	McLaren, Kaili	1.88 m (6 ft 2 in)

Head coach

- (Australia) Paul Goriss

Assistant coach(es)

- (Australia) Phil Brown
- (Australia) Carly Wilson
- (Australia) Bec Goddard

Legend

- (C) Team captain
- (DP) Development player
- (I) Import player
- Injured

- Roster
Updated: 12 October 2018

=== Dandenong Rangers ===
2018–19 Dandenong Rangers roster
Players
Coaches

Pos.	No.	Nat.	Name	Ht.
G	1	(Australia)	Cole, Rebecca	1.78 m (5 ft 10 in)
F	2	(United States)	Pedersen, Kayla	1.93 m (6 ft 4 in)
G	3	(Australia)	Reid, Stephanie	1.68 m (5 ft 6 in)
G/F	4	(United States)	Laney, Betnijah	1.83 m (6 ft 0 in)
G	5	(Australia)	Lavey, Tessa	1.72 m (5 ft 8 in)
F	7	(Australia)	Pizzey, Rebecca	1.90 m (6 ft 3 in)
F	10	(Australia)	Rowe, Kiera	1.80 m (5 ft 11 in)
F	11	(Australia)	Mijović, Carley	1.96 m (6 ft 5 in)
F	12	(Australia)	Jarry, Rachel	1.85 m (6 ft 1 in)
G	14	(Australia)	Todhunter, Amelia (C)	1.69 m (5 ft 7 in)
F	15	(Australia)	Blicavs, Sara	1.89 m (6 ft 2 in)
C	22	(Australia)	Roberts, Tayla	1.91 m (6 ft 3 in)
G	23	(Australia)	Whatman, Bree	1.70 m (5 ft 7 in)

Head coach

- (Australia) Larissa Anderson

Assistant coach(es)

- (Canada) Lori Chizik
- (Australia) John White

Legend

- (C) Team captain
- (DP) Development player
- (I) Import player
- Injured

- Roster
Updated: 10 October 2018

=== Melbourne Boomers ===
2018–19 Melbourne Boomers roster
Players
Coaches

Pos.	No.	Nat.	Name	Ht.
F	1	(Australia)	Grant, Ashleigh	1.88 m (6 ft 2 in)
G	4	(Australia)	Shelley, Jazmin	1.74 m (5 ft 9 in)
G	7	(Australia)	Talbot, Stephanie	1.88 m (6 ft 2 in)
G/F	11	(Australia)	O'Hea, Jenna (C)	1.87 m (6 ft 2 in)
G	12	(Australia)	D'Angelo, Chelsea	1.77 m (5 ft 10 in)
F	13	(Australia)	Magbegor, Eziyoda	1.93 m (6 ft 4 in)
G	14	(Australia)	Conti, Monique	1.65 m (5 ft 5 in)
G	15	(United States)	Allen, Lindsay	1.73 m (5 ft 8 in)
F/C	22	(Australia)	George, Cayla	1.92 m (6 ft 4 in)
G	23	(Australia)	Garrick, Madeleine	1.78 m (5 ft 10 in)
F	32	(New Zealand)	Purcell, Kalani	1.87 m (6 ft 2 in)
C	42	(United States)	Boothe, Sarah	1.95 m (6 ft 5 in)

Head coach

- (Australia) Guy Molloy

Assistant coach(es)

- (New Zealand) Kennedy Kereama
- (Australia) Paul Flynn
- (Australia) Nicole Howard

Legend

- (C) Team captain
- (DP) Development player
- (I) Import player
- Injured

- Roster
Updated: 29 August 2018

=== Perth Lynx ===
2018–19 Perth Lynx roster
Players
Coaches

Pos.	No.	Nat.	Name	Ht.
G	5	(Australia)	Mansfield, Lauren	1.70 m (5 ft 7 in)
G	7	(New Zealand)	Farnworth, Antonia (C)	1.81 m (5 ft 11 in)
G	10	(Australia)	Ebzery, Katie-Rae	1.78 m (5 ft 10 in)
F	11	(Australia)	Allen, Maddison	1.90 m (6 ft 3 in)
F	12	(United States)	Steindl, Kayla	1.87 m (6 ft 2 in)
G	23	(Australia)	Heal, Shyla	1.67 m (5 ft 6 in)
G	24	(United States)	McPhee, Brittany	1.83 m (6 ft 0 in)
F	31	(United States)	Taylor, Asia	1.85 m (6 ft 1 in)
G/F	32	(United States)	Schwagmeyer, Alison	1.77 m (5 ft 10 in)
F/C	34	(Australia)	Collins, Ellie	1.82 m (6 ft 0 in)

Head coach

- (Australia) Andy Stewart

Legend

- (C) Team captain
- (DP) Development player
- (I) Import player
- Injured

- Roster
Updated: 10 October 2018

=== Sydney Uni Flames ===
2018–19 Sydney Uni Flames roster
Players
Coaches

Pos.	No.	Nat.	Name	Ht.
G	2	(Australia)	Walmsley, Susannah	1.70 m (5 ft 7 in)
G	3	(United States)	Smart, Brittany	1.70 m (5 ft 7 in)
G	4	(Australia)	Tupaea, Tahlia	1.75 m (5 ft 9 in)
G	5	(Australia)	Panousis, Vanessa	1.70 m (5 ft 7 in)
G	8	(Australia)	Wilson, Alex	1.80 m (5 ft 11 in)
F	10	(Australia)	Greaves, Shanae	1.85 m (6 ft 1 in)
F	11	(United States)	Johnson, Amanda	1.87 m (6 ft 2 in)
G	12	(Australia)	Snell, Belinda (C)	1.80 m (5 ft 11 in)
C	13	(Australia)	Bunton, Alex	1.96 m (6 ft 5 in)
F	14	(Australia)	McSpadden, Lara	1.94 m (6 ft 4 in)
G	22	(Australia)	O'Hehir, Madeleine	1.79 m (5 ft 10 in)
G	44	(Australia)	Graham, Sarah	1.63 m (5 ft 4 in)

Head coach

- (Australia) Cheryl Chambers

Legend

- (C) Team captain
- (DP) Development player
- (I) Import player
- Injured

- Roster
Updated: 22 September 2018

=== Townsville Fire ===
2018–19 Townsville Fire roster
Players
Coaches

Pos.	No.	Nat.	Name	Ht.
G	1	(United States)	Mincy, Laurin	1.83 m (6 ft 0 in)
G	6	(Australia)	Donnelly, Mikhaela	1.73 m (5 ft 8 in)
G	7	(New Zealand)	Beck, Stella	1.83 m (6 ft 0 in)
C	8	(Australia)	Batkovic, Suzy (C)	1.94 m (6 ft 4 in)
F	9	(Australia)	Madgen, Tess	1.80 m (5 ft 11 in)
F	11	(United States)	Malott, Ally	1.90 m (6 ft 3 in)
G	13	(Australia)	Samuels, Casey	1.82 m (6 ft 0 in)
F	14	(Australia)	Garbin, Darcee	1.88 m (6 ft 2 in)
C	15	(Australia)	Aokuso, Zitina	1.92 m (6 ft 4 in)
G	32	(New Zealand)	Cocks, Micaela	1.74 m (5 ft 9 in)

Head coach

- (Australia) Claudia Brassard

Assistant coach(es)

- (Australia) Luke Brennan
- (Australia) Mike St-Maurice

Legend

- (C) Team captain
- (DP) Development player
- (I) Import player
- Injured

- Roster
Updated: 22 September 2018

== Development players ==
Team	Pos.	No.	Nat.	Player	Ht.
Adelaide Lightning	G	22	(Australia)	Porter, Ruby	1.78 (5 ft 10 in)
Bendigo Spirit	G	4	(Australia)	Dufelmeier, Bianca	1.71 m (5 ft 7 in)
Bendigo Spirit	G	9	(Australia)	Wragg, Courtenay	1.80 m (5 ft 11 in)
Bendigo Spirit	F	40	(Australia)	McLachlan, Caitlin	1.80 m (5 ft 11 in)
Canberra Capitals	G	8	(Australia)	Cubillo, Abby	1.68 m (5 ft 6 in)
Canberra Capitals	F	14	(Australia)	Bourne, Isabelle	1.86 m (6 ft 1 in)
Canberra Capitals	G	25	(Australia)	Loader, Eliza Jane	1.72 m (5 ft 8 in)
Dandenong Rangers	F	6	(Australia)	Puli, Madeline	1.86 m (6 ft 1 in)
Dandenong Rangers	G	20	(Australia)	Giliam, Taylah	1.73 m (5 ft 8 in)
Dandenong Rangers	G	–	(Australia)	Amoore, Georgia	1.67 m (5 ft 6 in)
Dandenong Rangers	–	–	(Australia)	Hanifan, Leia	-.- (-)
Dandenong Rangers	G/F	–	(Australia)	Poa, Last-Tear	1.79 m (5 ft 10 in)
Dandenong Rangers	–	–	(Australia)	Taylor, Saraid	-.- (-)
Melbourne Boomers	F	2	(New Zealand)	Stockill, Josephine	1.90 m (6 ft 3 in)
Melbourne Boomers	F/C	5	(Australia)	Pollerd, Olivia	1.87 m (6 ft 2 in)
Melbourne Boomers	G	6	(Australia)	Santomaggio, Leah	1.75 m (5 ft 9 in)
Melbourne Boomers	F/C	8	(Australia)	Anstey, Isobel	1.91 m (6 ft 3 in)
Melbourne Boomers	–	9	(Australia)	Edmanson, Lara	-.- (-)
Melbourne Boomers	G/F	10	(Australia)	Melbourne, Jade	1.76 m (5 ft 9 in)
Perth Lynx	–	3	(Australia)	Williams, Nes'eya	-.- (-)
Perth Lynx	F	8	(Australia)	Miotti, Isabelle	1.78 m (5 ft 10 in)
Perth Lynx	–	30	(Australia)	Burrows, Tayah	-.- (-)
Perth Lynx	G	35	(Australia)	Denehey, Georgia	1.87 m (6 ft 2 in)
Sydney Uni Flames					
Townsville Fire	F/C	–	(Australia)	Fowler, Alexandra	1.82 m (6 ft 0 in)
