= List of 2019–20 WNBL team rosters =

2019–20 WNBL season
- League: Women's National Basketball League
- Sport: Basketball
- Teams: 8

WNBL seasons
- ← 2018–19 2020 →

Below is a list of the rosters for the 2019–20 WNBL season.

== Rosters ==
=== Adelaide Lightning ===
2019–20 Adelaide Lightning roster
Players
Coaches

Pos.	No.	Nat.	Name	Ht.
G	1	(Australia)	Nicholson, Lauren	1.80 m (5 ft 11 in)
G	3	(Australia)	Kaser, Hannah	1.78 m (5 ft 10 in)
G	6	(Australia)	Elsworthy, Sarah	1.71 m (5 ft 7 in)
G/F	7	(Australia)	Talbot, Stephanie	1.88 m (6 ft 2 in)
F/C	8	(Australia)	Brook, Chelsea	1.88 m (6 ft 2 in)
F	10	(Australia)	Hodges, Laura	1.88 m (6 ft 2 in)
F	11	(United States)	Turner, Brianna	1.91 m (6 ft 3 in)
G	16	(Australia)	Hurst, Natalie	1.63 m (5 ft 4 in)
F	21	(Australia)	Porter, Ruby	1.78 m (5 ft 10 in)
F	33	(United States)	Westbeld, Kathryn	1.88 m (6 ft 2 in)
G	35	(Australia)	Seekamp, Nicole (C)	1.78 m (5 ft 10 in)

Head coach

- (Australia) Chris Lucas

Assistant coach(es)

- (Australia) Zach O'Brien
- (Australia) Marcus Wong

Legend

- (C) Team captain
- (DP) Development player
- (I) Import player
- Injured

- Roster
Updated: 27 November 2019

=== Bendigo Spirit ===
2019–20 Bendigo Spirit roster
Players
Coaches

Pos.	No.	Nat.	Name	Ht.
G	3	(Australia)	Tessari, Kara	1.65 m (5 ft 5 in)
G	4	(Australia)	Heal, Shyla	1.67 m (5 ft 6 in)
F	12	(Australia)	Skinner, Demi	1.90 m (6 ft 3 in)
G	13	(Australia)	Wehrung, Abigail	1.78 m (5 ft 10 in)
F	18	(Australia)	Ernst, Carley	1.96 m (6 ft 5 in)
F	20	(Australia)	Richards, Gabrielle	1.88 m (6 ft 2 in)
G	22	(Australia)	Wilson, Kelly	1.70 m (5 ft 7 in)
G	24	(Australia)	Lavey, Tessa	1.72 m (5 ft 8 in)
F	35	(United States)	Grays, Martè	1.88 m (6 ft 2 in)

Head coach

- (Australia) Tracy York

Assistant coach(es)

- (Australia) Mark Alabakov
- (Australia) Tom Thorn
- (Australia) Cam Wilkosz

Legend

- (C) Team captain
- (DP) Development player
- (I) Import player
- Injured

- Roster
Updated: 16 January 2020

=== Canberra Capitals ===
2019–20 Canberra Capitals roster
Players
Coaches

Pos.	No.	Nat.	Name	Ht.
G	0	(France)	Époupa, Olivia	1.65 m (5 ft 5 in)
G	4	(Australia)	Wallace, Kristy (injured)	1.80 m (5 ft 11 in)
G	8	(Australia)	Cubillo, Abby	1.61 m (5 ft 3 in)
G	9	(Australia)	Rocci, Maddison	1.68 m (5 ft 6 in)
F	10	(Australia)	Potter, Gemma	1.82 m (6 ft 0 in)
G	11	(Canada)	Nurse, Kia	1.83 m (6 ft 0 in)
C	12	(Australia)	Tolo, Marianna (C)	1.96 m (6 ft 5 in)
F	14	(Australia)	Delaney, Alex	1.83 m (6 ft 0 in)
F	21	(Australia)	Froling, Keely	1.88 m (6 ft 2 in)
F	23	(Australia)	Griffin, Kelsey (C)	1.88 m (6 ft 2 in)

Head coach

- (Australia) Paul Goriss

Assistant coach(es)

- (Australia) Carly Wilson
- (Australia) Kristen Veal
- (Australia) Jenny Lonergan

Legend

- (C) Team captain
- (DP) Development player
- (I) Import player
- Injured

- Roster
Updated: 16 January 2020

=== Melbourne Boomers ===
2019–20 Melbourne Boomers roster
Players
Coaches

Pos.	No.	Nat.	Name	Ht.
G	3	(United States)	Cunningham, Sophie	1.85 m (6 ft 1 in)
G	7	(New Zealand)	Farnworth, Antonia	1.81 m (5 ft 11 in)
F	11	(New Zealand)	Davidson, Penina	1.90 m (6 ft 3 in)
G	12	(Australia)	D'Angelo, Chelsea	1.77 m (5 ft 10 in)
F	13	(Australia)	Magbegor, Ezi	1.93 m (6 ft 4 in)
G	14	(Australia)	Conti, Monique	1.65 m (5 ft 5 in)
G	15	(United States)	Allen, Lindsay	1.73 m (5 ft 8 in)
G	21	(New Zealand)	Beck, Stella	1.83 m (6 ft 0 in)
F/C	22	(Australia)	George, Cayla (C)	1.92 m (6 ft 4 in)
G	23	(Australia)	Garrick, Madeleine (C)	1.78 m (5 ft 10 in)
F	32	(New Zealand)	Purcell, Kalani	1.87 m (6 ft 2 in)

Head coach

- (Australia) Guy Molloy

Assistant coach(es)

- (Australia) Larissa Anderson
- (Australia) Paul Flynn
- (New Zealand) Kennedy Kereama

Legend

- (C) Team captain
- (DP) Development player
- (I) Import player
- Injured

- Roster
Updated: 18 August 2019

=== Perth Lynx ===
2019–20 Perth Lynx roster
Players
Coaches

Pos.	No.	Nat.	Name	Ht.
F	3	(Australia)	Williams, Nes'eya	1.86 m (6 ft 1 in)
G	5	(Australia)	Mansfield, Lauren (C)	1.70 m (5 ft 7 in)
G	7	(United States)	Atkins, Ariel	1.80 m (5 ft 11 in)
G	10	(Australia)	Ebzery, Katie (C)	1.78 m (5 ft 10 in)
F	11	(Australia)	Allen, Maddison	1.90 m (6 ft 3 in)
F	12	(Australia)	Payne, Nadeen	1.88 m (6 ft 2 in)
G	15	(Australia)	Burrows, Tayah	1.79 m (5 ft 10 in)
G/F	21	(Australia)	Whittle, Marena	1.80 m (5 ft 11 in)
G/F	32	(United States)	Schwagmeyer, Alison	1.77 m (5 ft 10 in)

Head coach

- (Australia) Andy Stewart

Assistant coach(es)

- (Australia) Ryan Petrik

Legend

- (C) Team captain
- (DP) Development player
- (I) Import player
- Injured

- Roster
Updated: 16 January 2020

=== Southside Flyers ===
2019–20 Southside Flyers roster
Players
Coaches

Pos.	No.	Nat.	Name	Ht.
G	1	(Australia)	Cole, Rebecca	1.78 m (5 ft 10 in)
C	2	(Australia)	Tomlinson, Louella	1.93 m (6 ft 4 in)
G	3	(Australia)	Clydesdale, Aimie	1.78 m (5 ft 10 in)
G/F	4	(Australia)	O'Hea, Jenna (C)	1.87 m (6 ft 2 in)
G	5	(Australia)	Mitchell, Leilani	1.65 m (5 ft 5 in)
F	8	(Australia)	Pizzey, Rebecca	1.90 m (6 ft 3 in)
F	10	(Australia)	Rowe, Kiera	1.80 m (5 ft 11 in)
G	12	(Australia)	Reid, Stephanie	1.68 m (5 ft 6 in)
F	15	(Australia)	Blicavs, Sara	1.89 m (6 ft 2 in)
C	21	(United States)	Russell, Mercedes	1.98 m (6 ft 6 in)
G/F	24	(Australia)	Maley, Anneli	1.88 m (6 ft 2 in)

Head coach

- (Australia) Cheryl Chambers

Assistant coach(es)

- (Australia) Belinda Snell

Legend

- (C) Team captain
- (DP) Development player
- (I) Import player
- Injured

- Roster
Updated: 16 January 2020

=== Sydney Uni Flames ===
2019–20 Sydney Uni Flames roster
Players
Coaches

Pos.	No.	Nat.	Name	Ht.
F	1	(Australia)	Kunek, Alice	1.86 m (6 ft 1 in)
G	3	(United States)	Smart, Brittany	1.70 m (5 ft 7 in)
G	4	(Australia)	Tupaea, Tahlia	1.75 m (5 ft 9 in)
F	7	(Australia)	Hodge, Kim	1.82 m (6 ft 0 in)
G	8	(Australia)	Wilson, Alex	1.80 m (5 ft 11 in)
F	10	(Australia)	Greaves, Shanae	1.85 m (6 ft 1 in)
C	11	(Australia)	Scherf, Lauren	1.96 m (6 ft 5 in)
F	14	(Australia)	McSpadden, Lara	1.94 m (6 ft 4 in)
G	21	(Australia)	Graham, Sarah (C)	1.63 m (5 ft 4 in)
G	22	(Australia)	O'Hehir, Madeleine	1.79 m (5 ft 10 in)
F	30	(United States)	Kuster, Jessica	1.88 m (6 ft 2 in)
F	42	(United States)	Planeta, Colleen (injured)	1.88 m (6 ft 2 in)

Head coach

- (Australia) Katrina Hibbert

Assistant coach(es)

- (Australia) Tom Garlepp
- (Australia) Hannah Lowe

Legend

- (C) Team captain
- (DP) Development player
- (I) Import player
- Injured

- Roster
Updated: 16 January 2020

=== Townsville Fire ===
2019–20 Townsville Fire roster
Players
Coaches

Pos.	No.	Nat.	Name	Ht.
F	4	(Australia)	Young, Hannah	1.85 m (6 ft 1 in)
F	9	(Australia)	Madgen, Tess	1.80 m (5 ft 11 in)
F/C	10	(Australia)	Bishop, Abby	1.89 m (6 ft 2 in)
G	11	(Australia)	Gaze, Kate	1.78 m (5 ft 10 in)
G	12	(Australia)	Ebzery, Alison	1.78 m (5 ft 10 in)
F	14	(Australia)	Garbin, Darcee	1.88 m (6 ft 2 in)
C	15	(Australia)	Aokuso, Zitina (injured)	1.94 m (6 ft 4 in)
G	21	(Canada)	Carleton, Bridget	1.85 m (6 ft 1 in)
F	22	(Australia)	Boag, Christina	1.88 m (6 ft 2 in)
G	32	(New Zealand)	Cocks, Micaela (C)	1.74 m (5 ft 9 in)
G	35	(Belgium)	Vanloo, Julie	1.68 m (5 ft 6 in)

Head coach

- (Australia) Shannon Seebohm

Assistant coach(es)

- (Australia) Luke Brennan

Legend

- (C) Team captain
- (DP) Development player
- (I) Import player
- Injured

- Roster
Updated: 11 October 2019

== Development players ==
Team	Pos.	No.	Nat.	Player	Ht.
Adelaide Lightning	G	5	(Australia)	Angley, Danielle	1.68 m (5 ft 6 in)
Adelaide Lightning	F	9	(Australia)	Edwards, Jessie	1.93 m (6 ft 4 in)
Adelaide Lightning	G	15	(Australia)	Fejo, Jasmin	1.77 m (5 ft 10 in)
Adelaide Lightning	F	31	(United States)	Rintala, Jennie	1.88 m (6 ft 2 in)
Bendigo Spirit	G	1	(Australia)	Stratford, Isabella	1.79 m (5 ft 10 in)
Bendigo Spirit	G	5	(Australia)	Burton, Kasey	1.78 m (5 ft 10 in)
Canberra Capitals	G	1	(Australia)	Wheatley, Maddison	1.75 m (5 ft 9 in)
Canberra Capitals	F	2	(Australia)	Thornberry, Pyper	1.83 m (6 ft 0 in)
Canberra Capitals	G	5	(Australia)	Reilly, Shakera	1.78 m (5 ft 10 in)
Canberra Capitals	G	6	(Australia)	Scanlon, Lily	1.75 m (5 ft 9 in)
Melbourne Boomers	F	4	(Australia)	Price, Paige	1.84 m (6 ft 1 in)
Melbourne Boomers	G	6	(Australia)	Brewster, Rachel	1.80 m (5 ft 11 in)
Perth Lynx	G	6	(Australia)	Williams, Jewel	1.68 m (5 ft 6 in)
Perth Lynx	G	8	(Australia)	Strelein, Emma	1.68 m (5 ft 6 in)
Perth Lynx	G	9	(Australia)	Winter, Hayley	1.65 m (5 ft 5 in)
Perth Lynx	F	22	(Australia)	Counsel, Emily	1.91 m (6 ft 3 in)
Southside Flyers	F	6	(Australia)	Taylor, Saraid	1.72 m (5 ft 8 in)
Southside Flyers	G	9	(Australia)	Trotto, Jacqueline	-.- (-)
Southside Flyers	G	11	(Australia)	O'Neill, Amy	1.68 m (5 ft 6 in)
Southside Flyers	G	20	(Australia)	Giliam, Taylah	1.70 m (5 ft 7 in)
Sydney Uni Flames					
Townsville Fire	G	23	(Australia)	Fabbro, Aliza	1.72 m (5 ft 8 in)
Townsville Fire	G	25	(Australia)	Howe, Jasmin	1.70 m (5 ft 7 in)
