= 2016–17 Dandenong Rangers season =

- Head Coach: Larissa Anderson
- Captain: Aimie Clydesdale; Stephanie Cumming
- Venue: Dandenong Stadium

Results
- Record: 15–9
- Ladder: 2nd
- Finals: Grand Final (defeated by Sydney, 0–2)

Leaders
- Points: Cumming (17.5)
- Rebounds: Blicavs (7.0)
- Assists: Cumming (3.3)

The 2016–17 Dandenong Rangers season was the 25th season for the franchise in the Women's National Basketball League (WNBL). The Rangers finished the regular season with a 15–9 record, securing the 2nd seed going into the finals. After defeating the Perth Lynx 2–1 in the Semi-finals, they then faced the Sydney Uni Flames in the Grand Final series where they lost the series 0–2.

== Roster ==
2016–17 Dandenong Rangers roster
Players
Coaches

Pos.	No.	Nat.	Name	Ht.
G	5	(Australia)	Clydesdale, Aimie (C)	1.78 m (5 ft 10 in)
G	6	(Australia)	Antoniadou, Rachel	1.73 m (5 ft 8 in)
G	7	(Australia)	Whatman, Briahna	1.69 m (5 ft 7 in)
G	8	(Australia)	Cumming, Stephanie (C)	1.78 m (5 ft 10 in)
C	9	(Australia)	Kennedy, Jacinta	1.87 m (6 ft 2 in)
F	10	(Australia)	Bibby, Chloe	1.85 m (6 ft 1 in)
C	11	(Australia)	Scherf, Lauren	1.96 m (6 ft 5 in)
G	14	(Australia)	Todhunter, Amelia	1.69 m (5 ft 7 in)
F	15	(Australia)	Blicavs, Sara	1.89 m (6 ft 2 in)
G	21	(United States)	Novosel, Natalie	1.80 m (5 ft 11 in)
G/F	22	(Australia)	Fadljevic, Rosemary	1.84 m (6 ft 0 in)
F	33	(United States)	Malott, Ally	1.90 m (6 ft 3 in)

Head coach

- (Australia) Larissa Anderson

Assistant coach(es)

- (Australia) James Anderson
- (Australia) Michelle Brogan
- (Australia) John White

Legend

- (C) Team captain
- (DP) Development player
- (I) Import player
- Injured

- Roster
Updated: 27 November 2016

== Standings ==
#	WNBL Championship Ladder				
#	Team	W	L	PCT	GP
1	Sydney Uni Flames	18	6	75.00	24
2	Dandenong Rangers	15	9	62.50	24
3	Perth Lynx	15	9	62.50	24
4	Townsville Fire	14	10	58.33	24
5	Canberra Capitals	13	11	54.17	24
6	Bendigo Spirit	13	11	54.17	24
7	Melbourne Boomers	5	19	20.83	24
8	Adelaide Lightning	3	21	12.50	24

== Results ==
=== Regular season ===
Game	Date	Team	Score	High points	High rebounds	High assists	Location	Record
1	October; 8	@ Canberra	71–69	Blicavs (23)	Scherf (9)	Novosel (2)	Southern Cross Stadium	1–0
2	October; 15	@ Bendigo	44–59	Novosel (9)	Clydesdale, Cumming, Scherf (4)	Clydesdale, Novosel (2)	Bendigo Stadium	1–1
3	October; 16	Perth	94–74	Cumming (31)	Cumming (12)	Novosel (9)	Dandenong Stadium	2–1
4	October; 21	Townsville	92–65	Cumming (21)	Blicavs, Scherf (8)	Clydesdale, Cumming (6)	Dandenong Stadium	3–1
5	October; 28	Bendigo	85–94	Cumming (24)	Scherf (5)	Blicavs, Cumming (5)	Dandenong Stadium	3–2
6	October; 31	@ Melbourne	69–67	Blicavs (28)	Todhunter (12)	Clydesdale (4)	State Basketball Centre	4–2
7	November; 6	Canberra	70–83	Cumming (22)	Blicavs (11)	Cumming (6)	Dandenong Stadium	4–3
8	November; 12	Canberra	82–63	Cumming (18)	Blicavs (8)	Cumming (5)	Traralgon Sports Stadium	5–3
9	November; 20	Melbourne	78–69	Cumming (22)	Malott (8)	Todhunter (5)	Dandenong Stadium	6–3
10	November; 26	Adelaide	77–64	Scherf (21)	Blicavs (16)	Todhunter (4)	Dandenong Stadium	7–3
11	December; 3	Sydney	91–83	Malott (22)	Todhunter (11)	Cumming (6)	Dandenong Stadium	8–3
12	December; 4	@ Bendigo	77–69	Blicavs (20)	Cumming (8)	Blicavs, Cumming (3)	Bendigo Stadium	9–3
13	December; 9	@ Adelaide	79–64	Blicavs (25)	Blicavs (13)	Clydesdale (3)	Adelaide Arena	10–3
14	December; 11	@ Perth	92–71	Cumming (22)	Cumming (11)	Todhunter (5)	Bendat Basketball Centre	11–3
15	December; 17	@ Sydney	67–82	Clydesdale, Cumming (15)	Blicavs (12)	Clydesdale (4)	Brydens Stadium	11–4
16	January; 8	Adelaide	73–80	Blicavs (19)	Malott (8)	Novosel (6)	Dandenong Stadium	11–5
17	January; 14	Melbourne	73–61 (OT)	Malott (24)	Blicavs (9)	Cumming (5)	Dandenong Stadium	12–5
18	January; 21	@ Adelaide	85–58	Cumming (22)	Kennedy (7)	Blicavs (4)	Adelaide Arena	13–5
19	January; 25	@ Melbourne	78–66	Blicavs (25)	Blicavs, Cumming (6)	Clydesdale, Cumming, Novosel, Scherf (3)	State Basketball Centre	14–5
20	January; 29	@ Perth	77–87	Novosel (20)	Blicavs, Malott (5)	Novosel (5)	Bendat Basketball Centre	14–6
21	February; 5	Townsville	78–92	Blicavs (24)	Novosel (7)	Cumming (5)	Dandenong Stadium	14–7
22	February; 10	@ Townsville	66–83	Blicavs (12)	Blicavs (11)	Blicavs, Clydesdale, Kennedy, Todhunter (3)	Townsville RSL Stadium	14–8
23	February; 11	@ Sydney	77–81	Cumming (25)	Scherf (9)	Cumming (5)	Brydens Stadium	14–9
24	December; 30	Perth	81–59	Blicavs (20)	Novosel (7)	Clydesdale (6)	Dandenong Stadium	15–9

=== Finals ===
==== Semifinals ====
Game	Date	Team	Score	High points	High rebounds	High assists	Location	Series
1	February; 25	Perth	73–66	Cumming (25)	Blicavs (8)	Clydesdale (5)	Dandenong Stadium	1–0
2	March; 3	@ Perth	71–91	Cumming (30)	Kennedy (9)	Clydesdale (5)	Bendat Basketball Centre	1–1
3	March; 5	Perth	81–63	Cumming (22)	Kennedy (8)	Cumming (4)	Dandenong Stadium	2–1

==== Grand Final ====
Game	Date	Team	Score	High points	High rebounds	High assists	Location	Series
1	March; 11	@ Sydney	82–91	Blicavs (25)	Blicavs (8)	Cumming, Todhunter (6)	Brydens Stadium	0–1
2	March; 17	Sydney	62–75	Cumming (17)	Blicavs, Novosel (6)	Novosel (3)	Dandenong Stadium	0–2

== Awards ==
=== In-season ===
Award	Recipient	Round(s) / Date	Ref.
Team of the Week	Natalie Novosel	Rounds: 1, 19	
Team of the Week	Stephanie Cumming	Rounds: 2, 3, 6, 10	
Team of the Week	Sara Blicavs	Rounds: 4, 9, 10, 15	
Team of the Week	Lauren Scherf	Round 8	
Team of the Week	Ally Malott	Round 14	
Player of the Week	Stephanie Cumming	Round 10	
Player of the Week	Ally Malott	Round 14	
Coach of the Month	Larissa Anderson	December	
