= 2017 WNBL Finals =

Team	Coach	Wins
Sydney Uni Flames	Cheryl Chambers	2
Dandenong Rangers	Larissa Anderson	0
- Dates: February 25 – March 17
- MVP: Leilani Mitchell Flames

The 2017 WNBL Finals was the postseason tournament of the WNBL's 2016–17 season. The Sydney Uni Flames defeated the Dandenong Rangers 2–0, to win their fourth WNBL Championship title.

== Playoff qualifying ==
#	WNBL Championship Ladder				
#	Team	W	L	PCT	GP
1	Sydney Uni Flames	18	6	75.00	24
2	Dandenong Rangers	15	9	62.50	24
3	Perth Lynx	15	9	62.50	24
4	Townsville Fire	14	10	58.33	24
5	Canberra Capitals	13	11	54.17	24
6	Bendigo Spirit	13	11	54.17	24
7	Melbourne Boomers	5	19	20.83	24
8	Adelaide Lightning	3	21	12.50	24

== Bracket ==
Semifinals
1	Sydney Uni Flames	2
4	Townsville Fire	0
3	Perth Lynx	1
2	Dandenong Rangers	2

Grand Final
1	Sydney Uni Flames	2
2	Dandenong Rangers	0

== Finals ==
=== Semifinals ===
==== (1) Sydney Uni Flames vs. (4) Townsville Fire ====
25 February 2017

Boxscore

Sydney Uni Flames	111–69	Townsville Fire
Scoring by quarter: 25–16, 27–21, 38–14, 21–18
Pts: Wilson 27; Rebs: Hamson 10; Asts: Snell 5		Pts: Batkovic 18; Rebs: Batkovic 10; Asts: Batkovic 5

Brydens Stadium, Sydney, New South Wales

3 March 2017

Boxscore

Townsville Fire	61–76	Sydney Uni Flames
Scoring by quarter: 13–21, 11–16, 24–18, 13–21
Pts: Murray 16; Rebs: Batkovic 17; Asts: Wilson 4		Pts: Tupaea 18; Rebs: Tupaea 10; Asts: Mitchell 7
Sydney win series, 2–0

Townsville RSL Stadium, Townsville, Queensland

==== (2) Dandenong Rangers vs. (3) Perth Lynx ====
25 February 2017

Boxscore

Dandenong Rangers	73–66	Perth Lynx
Scoring by quarter: 20–14, 25–9, 16–17, 12–26
Pts: Cumming 25; Rebs: Blicavs 8 Asts: Clydesdale 5		Pts: Whitcomb 24; Rebs: Whitcomb 13; Asts: Edmondson, Lavey 3

Dandenong Stadium, Dandenong, Victoria

3 March 2017

Boxscore

Perth Lynx	91–71	Dandenong Rangers
Scoring by quarter: 30–22, 18–15, 15–24, 28–10
Pts: Whitcomb 41; Rebs: Whitcomb 9 Asts: Whitcomb 4		Pts: Cumming 30; Rebs: Kennedy 9 Asts: Clydesdale 5

Bendat Basketball Centre, Perth, Western Australia

5 March 2017

Boxscore

Dandenong Rangers	81–63	Perth Lynx
Scoring by quarter: 26–12, 15–17, 19–25, 21–9
Pts: Cumming 22; Rebs: Kennedy 8 Asts: Cumming 4		Pts: Whitcomb 20; Rebs: Mijović 7 Asts: Lavey 5
Dandenong win series, 2–1

Dandenong Stadium, Dandenong, Victoria

=== Grand Final ===
==== (1) Sydney Uni Flames vs. (2) Dandenong Rangers ====
11 March 2017

Boxscore

Sydney Uni Flames	91–82	Dandenong Rangers
Scoring by quarter: 26–22, 20–26, 23–20, 22–14
Pts: Wilson 22; Rebs: Hamson 8 Asts: Mitchell 6		Pts: Blicavs 25; Rebs: Blicavs 8 Asts: Cumming, Todhunter 6

Brydens Stadium, Sydney, New South Wales

17 March 2017

Boxscore

Dandenong Rangers	62–75	Sydney Uni Flames
Scoring by quarter: 22–16, 15–22, 11–20, 14–17
Pts: Cumming 17; Rebs: Blicavs, Novosel 6 Asts: Novosel 3		Pts: Mitchell, Snell 15; Rebs: Snell 11; Asts: Mitchell 4
Sydney win series, 2–0

Dandenong Stadium, Dandenong, Victoria

==== Rosters ====
2016–17 Sydney Uni Flames roster
Players
Coaches

Pos.	No.	Nat.	Name	Ht.
G	1	(Australia)	Nicholson, Lauren	1.80 m (5 ft 11 in)
G	4	(Australia)	Tupaea, Tahlia	1.75 m (5 ft 9 in)
C	5	(United States)	Hamson, Jennifer	2.00 m (6 ft 7 in)
G	6	(Australia)	Mitchell, Leilani	1.66 m (5 ft 5 in)
G	7	(Australia)	Wilson, Alex	1.80 m (5 ft 11 in)
F	10	(Australia)	Greaves, Shanae	1.85 m (6 ft 1 in)
F	11	(Australia)	Boag, Carly	1.88 m (6 ft 2 in)
G	12	(Australia)	Snell, Belinda (C)	1.80 m (5 ft 11 in)
F	14	(Australia)	McSpadden, Lara	1.94 m (6 ft 4 in)
G	15	(Australia)	Walmsley, Susannah	1.70 m (5 ft 7 in)
F	31	(United States)	Taylor, Asia	1.88 m (6 ft 2 in)
G	44	(Australia)	Graham, Sarah	1.63 m (5 ft 4 in)

Head coach

- (Australia) Cheryl Chambers

Assistant coach(es)

- (Australia) Darren Allie
- (Australia) Karen Dalton

Legend

- (C) Team captain
- (DP) Development player
- (I) Import player
- Injured

- Roster
Updated: 27 November 2016

2016–17 Dandenong Rangers roster
Players
Coaches

Pos.	No.	Nat.	Name	Ht.
G	5	(Australia)	Clydesdale, Aimie	1.78 m (5 ft 10 in)
G	6	(Australia)	Antoniadou, Rachel	1.73 m (5 ft 8 in)
G	7	(Australia)	Whatman, Briahna	1.69 m (5 ft 7 in)
G	8	(Australia)	Cumming, Stephanie (C)	1.78 m (5 ft 10 in)
C	9	(Australia)	Kennedy, Jacinta	1.87 m (6 ft 2 in)
F	10	(Australia)	Bibby, Chloe	1.85 m (6 ft 1 in)
C	11	(Australia)	Scherf, Lauren	1.96 m (6 ft 5 in)
G	14	(Australia)	Todhunter, Amelia	1.69 m (5 ft 7 in)
F	15	(Australia)	Blicavs, Sara	1.89 m (6 ft 2 in)
G	21	(United States)	Novosel, Natalie	1.80 m (5 ft 11 in)
G/F	22	(Australia)	Fadljevic, Rosemary	1.84 m (6 ft 0 in)
F	33	(United States)	Malott, Ally	1.90 m (6 ft 3 in)

Head coach

- (Australia) Larissa Anderson

Assistant coach(es)

- (Australia) James Anderson
- (Australia) Michelle Brogan
- (Australia) John White

Legend

- (C) Team captain
- (DP) Development player
- (I) Import player
- Injured

- Roster
Updated: 27 November 2016
