= 2016–17 Sydney Uni Flames season =

- Head Coach: Cheryl Chambers
- Captain: Belinda Snell
- Venue: Brydens Stadium

Results
- Record: 18–6
- Ladder: 1st
- Finals: WNBL Champions (defeated Dandenong, 2–0)

Leaders
- Points: Taylor (16.7)
- Rebounds: Hamson (8.3)
- Assists: Mitchell (6.2)

The 2016–17 Sydney Uni Flames season is the 37th season for the franchise in the Women's National Basketball League (WNBL).

== Roster ==
2016–17 Sydney Uni Flames roster
Players
Coaches

Pos.	No.	Nat.	Name	Ht.
G	1	(Australia)	Nicholson, Lauren	1.80 m (5 ft 11 in)
G	3	(Australia)	Moffatt, Hayley	1.76 m (5 ft 9 in)
G	4	(Australia)	Tupaea, Tahlia	1.75 m (5 ft 9 in)
C	5	(United States)	Hamson, Jennifer	2.00 m (6 ft 7 in)
G	6	(Australia)	Mitchell, Leilani	1.66 m (5 ft 5 in)
G	7	(Australia)	Wilson, Alex	1.80 m (5 ft 11 in)
F	8	(Australia)	Greaves, Shanae	1.85 m (6 ft 1 in)
F	11	(Australia)	Boag, Carly	1.88 m (6 ft 2 in)
G	12	(Australia)	Snell, Belinda (C)	1.80 m (5 ft 11 in)
F	14	(Australia)	McSpadden, Lara	1.94 m (6 ft 4 in)
F	31	(United States)	Taylor, Asia	1.88 m (6 ft 2 in)
G	33	(Australia)	McLean, Cassidy	1.80 m (5 ft 11 in)
G	44	(Australia)	Graham, Sarah	1.63 m (5 ft 4 in)

Head coach

- (Australia) Cheryl Chambers

Assistant coach(es)

- (Australia) Darren Allie
- (Australia) Karen Dalton

Legend

- (C) Team captain
- (DP) Development player
- (I) Import player
- Injured

- Roster
Updated: 27 November 2016

== Standings ==
#	WNBL Championship Ladder				
#	Team	W	L	PCT	GP
1	Sydney Uni Flames	18	6	75.00	24
2	Dandenong Rangers	15	9	62.50	24
3	Perth Lynx	15	9	62.50	24
4	Townsville Fire	14	10	58.33	24
5	Canberra Capitals	13	11	54.17	24
6	Bendigo Spirit	13	11	54.17	24
7	Melbourne Boomers	5	19	20.83	24
8	Adelaide Lightning	3	21	12.50	24

== Results ==
=== Regular season ===
Game	Date	Team	Score	High points	High rebounds	High assists	Location	Record
1	October; 7	Perth	90–93	Hamson (19)	Hamson (17)	Mitchell, Snell (9)	Brydens Stadium	0–1
2	October; 16	Canberra	80–89	Mitchell (20)	Hamson (10)	Mitchell (9)	Brydens Stadium	0–2
3	October; 21	@ Bendigo	74–69	Taylor, Wilson (15)	Boag (7)	Mitchell (5)	Bendigo Stadium	1–2
4	October; 22	Townsville	69–68	Mitchell (20)	Taylor (13)	Snell (7)	Brydens Stadium	2–2
5	November; 5	@ Townsville	83–85 (OT)	Mitchell (16)	Taylor (13)	Taylor (6)	Townsville RSL Stadium	2–3
6	November; 11	Melbourne	87–75	Taylor (20)	Boag (10)	Mitchell, Snell (8)	Brydens Stadium	3–3
7	November; 20	Townsville	78–72	Taylor (25)	Taylor (11)	Mitchell (8)	Brydens Stadium	4–3
8	November; 25	Bendigo	93–86 (OT)	Mitchell (18)	Hamson, Taylor (10)	Mitchell (11)	Brydens Stadium	5–3
9	December; 3	@ Dandenong	83–91	Snell (27)	Hamson, Snell (7)	Mitchell (7)	Dandenong Stadium	5–4
10	December; 4	@ Melbourne	80–71	Mitchell (25)	Hamson (11)	Snell (6)	State Basketball Centre	6–4
11	December; 8	@ Canberra	84–73	Mitchell (23)	Hamson (10)	Mitchell (6)	Southern Cross Stadium	7–4
12	December; 10	Bendigo	55–70	Hamson (16)	Hamson (8)	Graham (4)	Brydens Stadium	7–5
13	December; 17	Dandenong	82–67	Taylor (18)	Hamson (12)	Mitchell (10)	Brydens Stadium	8–5
14	December; 29	@ Adelaide	89–72	Taylor (26)	Hamson, Taylor (14)	Wilson (7)	Adelaide Arena	9–5
15	December; 30	@ Perth	93–69	Mitchell (27)	Taylor (13)	Taylor (8)	Bendat Basketball Centre	10–5
16	January; 8	Canberra	73–76	Wilson (16)	Boag (8)	Mitchell (8)	Brydens Stadium	10–6
17	January; 12	@ Adelaide	77–74	Wilson (15)	Hamson (8)	Mitchell (5)	Adelaide Arena	11–6
18	January; 13	@ Bendigo	71–68	Mitchell (25)	Taylor (10)	Mitchell, Snell (5)	Bendigo Stadium	12–6
19	January; 21	Perth	90–78	Taylor (32)	Taylor (9)	Mitchell (11)	Brydens Stadium	13–6
20	January; 26	@ Canberra	77–75	Snell (30)	Snell (8)	Mitchell (5)	Southern Cross Stadium	14–6
21	January; 28	@ Townsville	76–75	Mitchell (15)	Hamson (10)	Snell (6)	Townsville RSL Stadium	15–6
22	February; 5	@ Melbourne	72–67	Taylor (28)	Taylor (15)	Mitchell (7)	State Basketball Centre	16–6
23	February; 11	Dandenong	81–77	Mitchell (19)	Hamson (14)	Snell (7)	Brydens Stadium	17–6
24	February; 18	Adelaide	98–83	Mitchell (17)	Taylor (7)	Mitchell (6)	Brydens Stadium	18–6

=== Finals ===
==== Semifinals ====
Game	Date	Team	Score	High points	High rebounds	High assists	Location	Series
1	February; 25	Townsville	111–69	Wilson (27)	Hamson (10)	Snell (5)	Brydens Stadium	1–0
2	March; 3	@ Townsville	76–61	Tupaea (18)	Tupaea (10)	Mitchell (7)	Townsville RSL Stadium	2–0

==== Grand Final ====
Game	Date	Team	Score	High points	High rebounds	High assists	Location	Series
1	March; 11	Dandenong	91–82	Wilson (22)	Hamson (8)	Mitchell (6)	Brydens Stadium	1–0
2	March; 17	@ Dandenong	75–62	Mitchell, Snell (15)	Snell (11)	Mitchell (4)	Dandenong Stadium	2–0

== Awards ==
=== In-season ===
Award	Recipient	Round(s) / Date	Ref.
Team of the Week	Jennifer Hamson	Rounds: 1, 10	
Team of the Week	Leilani Mitchell	Rounds: 2, 3, 8, 12, 14, 15	
Team of the Week	Asia Taylor	Rounds: 3, 5, 6, 7, 11, 12, 15, 17	
Team of the Week	Belinda Snell	Rounds: 16, 18	
Player of the Week	Asia Taylor	Rounds: 6, 12	
Player of the Week	Leilani Mitchell	Round 15	
Player of the Week	Belinda Snell	Round 16	
Coach of the Month	Cheryl Chambers	November, January	
Player of the Month	Leilani Mitchell	January	

=== Postseason ===
Award	Recipient	Date	Ref.
Coach of the Year	Cheryl Chambers	23 February 2017	
All-Star Five	Leilani Mitchell	7 March 2017	
All-Star Five	Asia Taylor	7 March 2017	
Grand Final Most Valuable Player	Leilani Mitchell	17 March 2017	
