= Tresa (disambiguation) =

Tresa is a river in Italy and Switzerland.

Tresa may also refer to

- Tresa (name)
- Lavena Ponte Tresa, a municipality in Italy
- Ponte Tresa, a former municipality in Switzerland
- Tresa, Switzerland, a municipality in Switzerland, which contains Ponte Tresa.
  - Lugano–Ponte Tresa railway in Switzerland
  - Ponte Tresa railway station
