= 2014 BYU Cougars women's volleyball team =

American college volleyball season

2014 BYU Cougars women's volleyball

WCC regular season Champ

NCAA, National Runner-up
- Conference: West Coast Conference
- Record: 30–5 (16–2 WCC)
- Head coach: Shawn Olmstead (4th season)
- Assistant coaches: Heather Olmstead (4th season); David Hyte (1st season)
- Home arena: Smith Fieldhouse

The 2014 BYU Cougars women's volleyball team represented Brigham Young University in the 2014 NCAA Division I women's volleyball season. The Cougars, led by fourth year head coach Shawn Olmstead, played their home games at Smith Fieldhouse. The Cougars were members of the WCC and were picked to win the conference title in the preseason poll.

The Cougars won the WCC Championship in November and were awarded an NCAA Tournament berth. Despite being ranked in the Top 15 all season, BYU wasn't awarded one of the 16 NCAA Seeds for the NCAA Volleyball Tournament, forcing the Cougars to play on the road. BYU proceeded to win the Tucson Area, Seattle Regional, and became the first ever unseeded team to make it to the NCAA Volleyball Championship match. 6 different BYU players were awarded WCC honors, and 3 BYU players were awarded All-American honors. Shawn Olmstead was also named Coach of the year (see Season highlights).

The Cougars were swept by Penn State in the NCAA Championship match, giving the Nittany Lions their seventh national title, but the Cougars NCAA Tournament run gave the Cougars the #3 ranking at the end of the season.

2014 West Coast Conference volleyball standings
	Conf.				Overall
Team	W		L	PCT	W		L	PCT
No. 3 BYU ‍†‍‍^{y}	16	–	2	.889	30	–	5	.857
Pacific ‍‍‍	13	–	5	.722	24	–	7	.774
Santa Clara ‍‍‍^{y}	12	–	6	.667	22	–	10	.688
San Diego ‍‍‍^{y}	12	–	6	.667	19	–	12	.613
Loyola Marymount ‍‍‍^{y}	11	–	7	.611	23	–	8	.742
Gonzaga ‍‍‍	8	–	10	.444	17	–	12	.586
Pepperdine ‍‍‍	7	–	11	.389	13	–	17	.433
San Francisco ‍‍‍	5	–	13	.278	12	–	17	.414
Saint Mary's ‍‍‍	5	–	13	.278	9	–	19	.321
Portland ‍‍‍	1	–	17	.056	6	–	23	.207
† – Conference champion y- Invited to the NCAA volleyball tournament As of December 22, 2014; Rankings from AVCA

== Season highlights ==
- The Cougars began the season by sweeping 9 straight sets to win the 2014 Blue & Gold Player's Challenge.
- The Cougars were the last WCC team to lose a conference match.
- BYU clinched a share of the WCC title with their victory over San Diego on Nov. 14.
- BYU clinched the outright WCC title with their victory over Portland on Nov. 20.
- Alexa Gray was named the WCC player of the year; Whitney Young was named WCC defensive player of the year; Shawn Olmstead was named Co-Coach of the Year; Gray, Young, and Jennifer Hamson won WCC First team honors; and Amy Boswell was named WCC honorable mention.
- Boswell, Hamson, and Tia Withers Welling earned Academic All-WCC team first honors. Tambre Nobles and Young were named Honorable mention Academic All-WCC team members.
- Jennifer Hamson was named the Seattle Region MVP.
- Jennifer Hamson was made a first team All-American. Alexa Gray was named a second team All-American. Amy Boswell was named an Honorable mention All-American.
- Shawn Olmstead was named AVCA Coach of the year.
- BYU became the first unseeded team to make the NCAA Championship.

== Roster ==
2014 BYU Cougars Roster
Defensive Specialist/Libero: 1 Jaiden Achermann - Freshman; 8 Makenna Santiago - Sophomore; 14 Ciara Parker - Junior; 17 Tia Withers Welling - Senior; Middle blockers: 4 Madeline Graham - Freshman; 10 Amy Boswell - Sophomore; 16 Whitney Young - Sophomore	Outside hitters: 3 Alohi Robins-Hardy - Freshman; 6 Camille Walker - Freshman; 7 Hannah Robison - Senior; 9 Alexa Gray - Junior; 13 Danelle Parady - Freshman; 15 Tambre Nobles - Senior	Opposite hitters: 2 Cosy Burnett - Freshman; 15 Jennifer Hamson - Senior; Setters: 11 Malery Wahlin - Freshman; 20 Camry Godfrey Willardson - Junior

== Schedule ==
BYU Radio simulcast all BYUtv games with the BYUtv feed. BYU Radio also carried the NCAA semifinals and finals with Dave Neeley providing the call.

Date Time	Opponent	Rank	Arena City (Tournament)	Television	Score	Attendance	Record (WCC Record)
8/29; 5 p.m.	@ West Virginia	#9	WVU Coliseum; Morgantown, WV (Gold & Blue Player's Challenge)	Mountaineer TV	W 3-0 (29–27, 25–20, 25–20)	632	1-0
8/30; 9:30 a.m.	vs. IUPUI	#9	WVU Coliseum; Morgantown, WV (Gold & Blue Player's Challenge)		W 3-0 (25–19, 25–17, 25–18)	218	2-0
8/30; 2:30 p.m.	vs. Toledo	#9	WVU Coliseum; Morgantown, WV (Gold & Blue Player's Challenge)		W 3-0 (25–15, 25–20, 25–14)	215	3-0
9/5; 7 p.m.	#5 Washington	#10	Smith Fieldhouse; Provo, UT (BYU Invitational)	BYUtv	L 3-2 (25–18, 22–25, 25–21, 21–25, 15–10)	3,017	3-1
9/6; Noon	UMBC	#10	Smith Fieldhouse; Provo, UT (BYU Invitational)	BYUtv	W 3-0 (25–12, 25–15, 25–13)	N/A	4-1
9/6; 7 p.m.	Utah Valley	#10	Smith Fieldhouse; Provo, UT (BYU Invitational)	TheW.tv	W 3-0 (25–18, 25–18, 25–16)	1,052	5-1
9/12; 11 a.m.	vs. #14 Colorado State	#9	Pan American Center; Las Cruces, NM (UTEP/NMSU Invitational)		L 3-1 (23–25, 25–23, 25–20, 28–26)	104	5-2
9/12; 7 p.m.	@ UTEP	#9	Memorial Gymnasium; El Paso, TX (UTEP/NMSU Invitational)	C-USA Digital	W 3-0 (25–17, 25–6, 25–16)	793	6-2
9/13; Noon	@ New Mexico State	#9	Pan American Center; Las Cruces, NM (UTEP/NMSU Invitational)	ESPN3/Altitude	W 3-0 (25–16, 25–19, 25–21)	801	7-2
9/16; 7 p.m.	@ Idaho State	#12	Reed Gym; Pocatello, ID	Watch Big Sky	W 3-0 (25–18, 25–22, 25–14)	869	8-2
9/19; 7 p.m.	Utah	#12	Smith Fieldhouse; Provo, UT (Deseret First Duel)	BYUtv	W 3-0 (25–18, 25–16, 25–7)	3,814	9-2
9/25; 7 p.m.	*Gonzaga	#11	Smith Fieldhouse; Provo, UT	BYUtv	W 3-0 (25–22, 25–17, 25–13)	1,477	10-2 (1–0)
9/27; 1 p.m.	*Portland	#11	Smith Fieldhouse; Provo, UT	BYUtv	W 3-0 (25–16, 25–22, 25–21)	1,104	11-2 (2–0)
9/30; 7 p.m.	*@ Pepperdine	#10	Firestone Fieldhouse; Malibu, CA	ESPNU	W 3-0 (25–17, 25–21, 25–20)	823	12-2 (3–0)
10/2; 7 p.m.	*San Francisco	#10	Smith Fieldhouse; Provo, UT	BYUtv	W 3-1 (25–18, 25–18, 23–25, 25–11)	1,134	13-2 (4–0)
10/4; 8 p.m.	*Santa Clara	#10	Smith Fieldhouse; Provo, UT	BYUtv	W 3-0 (25–10, 25–15, 25–18)	1,386	14-2 (5–0)
10/9; 8 p.m.	*@ Pacific	#10	Alex G. Spanos Center; Stockton, CA	TheW.tv	W 3-1 (20–25, 25–17, 25–21, 25–17)	745	15-2 (6–0)
10/11; 2 p.m.	*@ Saint Mary's	#10	McKeon Pavilion; Moraga, CA	TheW.tv	W 3-1 (25–12, 23–25, 27–25, 25–14)	323	16-2 (7–0)
10/17; 8 p.m.	*@ San Diego	#9	Jenny Craig Pavilion; San Diego, CA	TheW.tv	L 3-2 (25–18, 22–25, 17–25, 25–20, 15–8)	876	16-3 (7–1)
10/23; 7 p.m.	*Loyola Marymount	#12	Smith Fieldhouse; Provo, UT	TheW.tv	W 3-0 (25–19, 25–9, 25–23)	1,064	17-3 (8–1)
10/25; 1 p.m.	*Pepperdine	#12	Smith Fieldhouse; Provo, UT	BYUtv	W 3-1 (25–10, 20–25, 25–20, 25–17)	1,286	18-3 (9–1)
10/30; 7 p.m.	*@ Santa Clara	#11	Leavey Center; Santa Clara, CA	Santa Clara Portal	L 3-0 (25–14, 25–21, 25–15)	300	18-4 (9–2)
11/1; 2 p.m.	*@ San Francisco	#11	War Memorial Gymnasium; San Francisco, CA	TheW.tv	W 3-0 (25–20, 26–24, 25–14)	233	19-4 (10–2)
11/6; 7 p.m.	*Saint Mary's	#14	Smith Fieldhouse; Provo, UT	BYUtv	W 3-0 (25–15, 25–15, 25–13)	1,296	20-4 (11–2)
11/8; 1 p.m.	*Pacific	#14	Smith Fieldhouse; Provo, UT	BYUtv	W 3-0 (25–21, 27–25, 26–24)	1,487	21-4 (12–2)
11/14; 7:30 p.m.	*San Diego	#13	Smith Fieldhouse; Provo, UT	BYUtv	W 3-1 (25–13, 25–15, 21–25, 25–15)	2,298	22-4 (13–2)
11/20; 8 p.m.	*@ Portland	#12	Chiles Center; Portland, OR	Portland Portal	W 3-0 (25–14, 25–19, 25–21)	390	23-4 (14–2)
11/22; 1 p.m.	*@ Gonzaga	#12	Charlotte Y. Martin Centre; Spokane, WA	TheW.tv	W 3-2 (21–25, 17–25, 25–18, 25–21, 15–10)	823	24-4 (15–2)
11/25; 8 p.m.	*@ Loyola Marymount	#12	Gersten Pavilion; Los Angeles, CA	TheW.tv	W 3-1 (30–28, 25–12, 23–25, 25–21)	526	25-4 (16–2)
12/4; 4 p.m.	y-vs. Seton Hall	#12	McKale Center; Tucson, AZ (NCAA 1st Round)	P12 Digital	W 3-0 (25–16, 25–18, 25–17)	2,001	26-4
12/5; 5:30 p.m.	y-@ #14 Arizona	#12	McKale Center; Tucson, AZ (NCAA 2nd Round)	P12 Digital	W 3-1 (22–25, 25–20, 25–23, 25–23)	1,515	27-4
12/12; 5 p.m.	y-vs. #8 Florida State	#12	Alaska Airlines Arena; Seattle, WA (NCAA regional semifinal)	ESPN3	W 3-1 (25–20, 25–19, 19–25, 26–24)	6,789	28-4
12/13; 9:30 p.m.	y-vs. #11 Nebraska	#12	Alaska Airlines Arena; Seattle, WA (NCAA Regional final)	ESPNU	W 3-0 (25–21, 25–20, 25–21)	4,885	29-4
12/18; 5 p.m.	y-vs. #6 Texas	#12	Chesapeake Energy Arena; Oklahoma City, OK (NCAA Semifinal)	ESPN2	W 3-1 (25–23, 25–16, 17–25, 26–24)	9,824	30-4
12/20; 5:30 p.m.	y-vs. #4 Penn State	#12	Chesapeake Energy Arena; Oklahoma City, OK (NCAA Final)	ESPN2	L 0-3 (21–25, 24–26, 14–25)	11,018	30-5

*-Indicates Conference Opponent
y-Indicates NCAA Playoffs
Times listed are Mountain Time Zone.

== Announcers for televised games ==
- @ West Virginia: No announcers (video only)
- Washington: Spencer Linton, Kristen Kozlowski, & Andy Boyce
- UMBC: Spencer Linton, Kristen Kozlowski, & Andy Boyce
- Utah Valley: Robbie Bullough & Dave Neeley
- @ UTEP: No announcers (video only)
- @ New Mexico State: Adam Young & Kelli Alvord
- @ Idaho State: Matt Steuart & Kade Vance
- Utah: Spencer Linton, Amy Gant, & Andy Boyce
- Gonzaga: Spencer Linton, Kristen Kozlowski, & Andy Boyce
- Portland: Spencer Linton, Kristen Kozlowski, & Andy Boyce
- @ Pepperdine: Kevin Barnett & Holly McPeak
- San Francisco: Spencer Linton, Amy Gant & Andy Boyce
- Santa Clara: Spencer Linton, Amy Gant, & Andy Boyce
- @ Pacific: Don Gubbins
- @ Saint Mary's: Anthony Schultz & Betsy Sedlak
- @ San Diego: Chris Loucks
- Loyola Marymount: Robbie Bullough & Dave Neeley
- Pepperdine: Jarom Jordan, Kristen Kozlowski, & Andy Boyce
- @ Santa Clara: No announcers (video only)
- @ San Francisco: Pat Olson
- Saint Mary's: Spencer Linton, Kristen Kozlowski, & Andy Boyce
- Pacific: Spencer Linton, Kristen Kozlowski, & Andy Boyce
- San Diego: Spencer Linton, Kristen Kozlowski, & Andy Boyce
- @ Portland: No announcers (video only)
- @ Gonzaga: No announcers (video only)
- @ Loyola Marymount: Steve Quis & Dustin Avol
- vs. Seton Hall: No announcers (video only)
- @ Arizona: No announcers (video only)
- vs. Florida State: Sam Gore & Holly McPeak
- vs. Nebraska: Sam Gore & Holly McPeak
- vs. Texas: Beth Mowins, Karch Kiraly, & Holly Rowe
- vs. Penn State: Beth Mowins, Karch Kiraly, & Holly Rowe
