= 2014 NCAA Division I women's volleyball tournament =

Volleyball competition

2014 NCAA women's Division I volleyball tournament
- 2014 Division I Championship
- Finals site: Chesapeake Energy Arena; Oklahoma City, Oklahoma
- Champions: Penn State (7th title)
- Runner-up: BYU (1st title match)
- Semifinalists: Texas (10th Final Four); Stanford (17th Final Four)
- Winning coach: Russ Rose (7th title)
- Most outstanding player: Megan Courtney (Penn State)
- Final Four All-Tournament Team: Micha Hancock (Penn State) Ali Frantti (Penn State); Jennifer Hamson (BYU); Alexa Gray (BYU); Brittany Howard (Stanford) Chiaka Ogbogu (Texas)

The 2014 NCAA Division I women's volleyball tournament began on December 4 and concluded on December 20 at Chesapeake Energy Arena in Oklahoma City, Oklahoma. The tournament field was announced on November 30.

Penn State defeated BYU in the finals to win the school's 7th NCAA title.

== Qualifying teams ==
The champions of the NCAA's 32 conferences qualify automatically. Twenty-two conferences hold tournaments, while the other ten award their automatic bid on the basis of being the league's regular-season champion. Those that do not hold tournaments are the American Athletic, Atlantic Coast, Big 12, Big Ten, Big West, Ivy League, Mountain West, Pac-12, Southeastern and West Coast Conferences. The other 32 bids are apportioned on an at-large basis. Only the top 16 teams overall are seeded.

=== Records ===
Ames Regional
Seed	School	Conference	Berth Type	RPI	Record
	Alabama State	SWAC	Automatic	274	20-18
	Ark.-Little Rock	Sun Belt	Automatic	31	29-4
	Cal State Bakersfield	WAC	Automatic	204	16-14
	Creighton	Big East	Automatic	24	25-8
8	Florida	Southeastern	Automatic	7	25-3
9	Illinois	Big Ten	At-Large	8	24-7
	Iowa State	Big 12	At-Large	15	18-9
16	Kansas	Big 12	At-Large	11	22-8
	Loyola Marymount	West Coast	At-Large	40	23-7
	Miami (FL)	Atlantic Coast	At-Large	28	21-8
	Michigan State	Big Ten	At-Large	48	18-13
	Murray State	Ohio Valley	Automatic	114	26-5
	Oregon State	Pac-12	At-Large	36	19-12
1	Stanford	Pac-12	Automatic	1	29-1
	UCF	American	Automatic	32	25-7
	Western Kentucky	Conference USA	Automatic	35	30-5

Seattle Regional
Seed	School	Conference	Berth Type	RPI	Record
	Alabama	Southeastern	At-Large	30	25-7
11	Arizona	Pac-12	At-Large	16	23-9
	BYU	West Coast	Automatic	17	25-4
	Duke	Atlantic Coast	At-Large	21	22-7
6	Florida State	Atlantic Coast	At-Large	3	28-2
	Hawaii	Big West	At-Large	39	21-6
	Hofstra	Colonial	Automatic	89	28-5
	Jacksonville	Atlantic Sun	Automatic	149	19-14
	Kansas State	Big 12	At-Large	23	22-8
14	Nebraska	Big Ten	At-Large	13	20-9
	New Hampshire	America East	Automatic	208	20-11
	Samford	Southern	Automatic	123	20-12
	Seton Hall	Big East	At-Large	47	28-7
	Utah	Pac-12	At-Large	37	19-12
3	Washington	Pac-12	At-Large	4	29-2
	Yale	Ivy League	Automatic	67	18-7

Louisville Regional
Seed	School	Conference	Berth Type	RPI	Record
	American	Patriot	Automatic	71	26-6
	Dayton	Atlantic 10	Automatic	58	29-5
	Illinois State	Missouri Valley	Automatic	29	26-5
13	Kentucky	Southeastern	At-Large	14	26-5
	Lipscomb	Atlantic Sun	At-Large	33	21-8
	LIU-Brooklyn	Northeast	Automatic	59	25-6
	Long Beach State	Big West	Automatic	26	26-4
	Marquette	Big East	At-Large	25	24-8
	Oakland	Horizon	Automatic	105	22-9
	Ohio State	Big Ten	At-Large	34	21-11
5	Penn State	Big Ten	At-Large	9	30-3
	San Diego	West Coast	At-Large	43	19-11
	Siena	MAAC	Automatic	186	19-14
12	UCLA	Pac-12	At-Large	18	20-11
	Western Michigan	Mid-American	Automatic	135	22-13
4	Wisconsin	Big Ten	Automatic	6	28-2

Minneapolis Regional
Seed	School	Conference	Berth Type	RPI	Record
	Arizona State	Pac-12	At-Large	41	19-13
	Coastal Carolina	Big South	Automatic	66	25-6
	Colorado	Pac-12	At-Large	27	19-13
15	Colorado State	Mountain West	Automatic	12	29-2
	Denver	Summit	Automatic	70	27-6
	Hampton	MEAC	Automatic	166	21-10
	LSU	Southeastern	At-Large	38	19-8
7	North Carolina	Atlantic Coast	Automatic	5	26-2
	Northern Colorado	Big Sky	Automatic	74	22-10
	Northwestern State	Southland	Automatic	224	16-16
	Oklahoma	Big 12	At-Large	20	20-10
10	Oregon	Pac-12	At-Large	10	21-9
	Santa Clara	West Coast	At-Large	46	22-9
2	Texas	Big 12	Automatic	2	23-2
	Texas A&M	Southeastern	At-Large	19	21-8
	USC	Pac-12	At-Large	22	15-15

== Bracket ==
The first two rounds were held on campus sites (the home court of the seeded team). Regional semifinals and finals were held at pre-determined sites. In 2014, those sites were hosted by Iowa State, Louisville, Minnesota, and Washington. Unlike the NCAA basketball tournament, where teams cannot be placed into regionals that they host, the selectors in the volleyball tournament were required to place qualifying teams in their 'home' regionals, in order to reduce travel costs.

=== Ames Regional ===
First round
1	Stanford	3
CS Bakersfield	0
Stanford, CA
Michigan State	3
Loyola Marymount	1
Creighton	1
Oregon State	3
Lawrence, KS
Arkansas Little Rock	3
16	Kansas	2
9	Illinois	3
Murray State	0
Champaign, IL
Western Kentucky	0
Iowa State	3
UCF	2
Miami	3
Gainesville, FL
Alabama St	0
8	Florida	3

Second round
1	Stanford	3
Michigan St.	1
Oregon St.	3
Arkansas Little Rock	2
9	Illinois	3
Iowa St.	0
Miami	1
8	Florida	3

Regional semifinals
1	Stanford	3
Oregon State	1
9	Illinois	2
8	Florida	3

Regional finals
1	Stanford	3
8	Florida	0

=== Louisville Regional ===
First round
4	Wisconsin	3
Western Michigan	0
Madison, WI
Marquette	2
Illinois St.	3
Lipscomb	0
Ohio State	3
Lexington, KY
Oakland	0
13	Kentucky	3
12	UCLA	3
LIU Brooklyn	0
Los Angeles, CA
Long Beach St.	3
San Diego	0
American	1
Dayton	3
University Park, PA
Siena	0
5	Penn State	3

Second round
4	Wisconsin	3
Illinois St.	0
Ohio St.	3
13	Kentucky	1
12	UCLA	3
Long Beach St.	0
Dayton	0
5	Penn St.	3

Regional semifinals
4	Wisconsin	3
Ohio St.	2
12	UCLA	0
5	Penn St.	3

Regional finals
4	Wisconsin	1
5	Penn St.	3

=== Seattle Regional ===
First round
3	Washington	3
New Hampshire	0
Seattle, WA
Hawaii	3
Duke	0
Kansas St.	0
Utah	3
Lincoln, NE
Hofstra	0
14	Nebraska	3
11	Arizona	3
Yale	0
Tucson, AZ
Seton Hall	0
BYU	3
Alabama	3
Samford	2
Tallahassee, FL
Jacksonville	0
6	Florida St	3

Second round
3	Washington	3
Hawaii	1
Utah	2
14	Nebraska	3
11	Arizona	1
BYU	3
Alabama	0
6	Florida St.	3

Regional semifinals
3	Washington	1
14	Nebraska	3
BYU	3
6	Florida St.	1

Regional finals
14	Nebraska	0
BYU	3

=== Minneapolis Regional ===
First round
2	Texas	3
Northwestern St.	0
Austin, TX
Texas A&M	1
Arizona St.	3
Northern Colorado	1
Colorado	3
Fort Collins, CO
Denver	0
15	Colorado St.	3
10	Oregon	3
Santa Clara	0
Eugene, OR
Oklahoma	0
LSU	3
Coastal Carolina	0
USC	3
Chapel Hill, NC
Hampton	0
7	North Carolina	3

Second round
2	Texas	3
Arizona St.	0
Colorado	2
15	Colorado St.	3
10	Oregon	3
LSU	1
USC	1
7	North Carolina	3

Regional semifinals
2	Texas	3
15	Colorado St.	0
10	Oregon	1
7	North Carolina	3

Regional finals
2	Texas	3
7	North Carolina	1

== Final Four ==
National semifinals
1	Stanford	1
5	Penn State	3
2	Texas	1
BYU	3

National Championship
5	Penn State	3
BYU	0

Final Four All-Tournament Team:

- Megan Courtney - Penn State (Most Outstanding Player)
- Micha Hancock - Penn State
- Ali Frantti - Penn State
- Jennifer Hamson - BYU
- Alexa Gray - BYU
- Brittany Howard - Stanford
- Chiaka Ogbogu - Texas

== Record by conference ==
Conference	# of Bids	Record	Win %	R32	S16	E8	F4	CM	NC
Big Ten	6	17-5	.773	6	5	3	1	1	1
West Coast	4	5-4	.556	1	1	1	1	1	–
Pac-12	10	17-10	.630	10	5	1	1	–	–
Big 12	5	5-5	.500	2	1	1	1	–	–
Southeastern	5	6-5	.545	4	1	1	–	–	–
Atlantic Coast	4	6-4	.600	3	2	1	–	–	–
Mountain West	1	2-1	.667	1	1	–	–	–	–
Big West	2	2-2	.500	2	–	–	–	–	–
Atlantic 10	1	1-1	.500	1	–	–	–	–	–
Missouri Valley	1	1-1	.500	1	–	–	–	–	–
Sun Belt	1	1-1	.500	1	–	–	–	–	–
Big East	3	0-3	.000	–	–	–	–	–	–
Atlantic Sun	2	0-2	.000	–	–	–	–	–	–
Other	19	0-19	.000	–	–	–	–	–	–

The columns R32, S16, E8, F4, CM, and NC respectively stand for the Round of 32, Sweet Sixteen, Elite Eight, Final Four, Championship Match, and National Champion.

== Television ==
Select first and second-round games were broadcast on local networks (NET, Longhorn Network, OC Sports, Pac-12 Network, SEC+, and ESPN3). ESPN3 aired 7 of the 8 Regional semifinals, with ESPNU airing one (Nebraska/Washington). ESPNU aired all the Regional Finals, and ESPN2 had the National semifinals and finals. Below are the ESPN announcing assignments for Volleyball Tournament games.

- Beth Mowins, Karch Kiraly (Ames), & Holly Rowe (Oklahoma City)
- Melissa Lee & Missy Whittemore (Louisville)
- Paul Sunderland & Maria Taylor (Minneapolis)
- Sam Gore & Holly McPeak (Seattle)
