= 2014 Texas Longhorns volleyball team =

American college volleyball season

2014 Texas Longhorns women's volleyball

Big 12 Conference Champion

NCAA volleyball tournament, Semifinal
- Conference: Big 12 Conference

Ranking
- Coaches: No. 5
- Record: 27–3 (15–1 Big 12)
- Head coach: Jerritt Elliott (14th season)
- Assistant coaches: Erik Sullivan (4th season); Tonya Johnson (1st season)
- Home arena: Gregory Gym

The 2014 Texas Longhorns volleyball team represented the University of Texas in the 2014 NCAA Division I women's volleyball season. The Texas Longhorns women's volleyball team, led by 14th year head coach Jerritt Elliott, played their home games at Gregory Gymnasium. The Longhorns were members of the Big 12 and were picked to win the conference title in the preseason poll.

The Longhorns won the Big 12 Championship and advanced to the National semifinals for the third time in four years. In the national semifinal Texas fell to unseeded BYU 3–1 to end their season.

2014 Big 12 Conference volleyball standings
	Conf.				Overall
Team	W		L	PCT	W		L	PCT
No. 5 Texas ‍†‍‍^{y}	15	–	1	.938	27	–	3	.900
Kansas ‍‍‍^{y}	10	–	6	.625	22	–	9	.710
Iowa State ‍‍‍^{y}	10	–	6	.625	19	–	9	.679
Oklahoma ‍‍‍^{y}	10	–	6	.625	20	–	11	.645
Kansas State ‍‍‍^{y}	9	–	7	.563	22	–	9	.710
West Virginia ‍‍‍	6	–	10	.375	16	–	14	.533
TCU ‍‍‍	6	–	10	.375	17	–	15	.531
Baylor ‍‍‍	4	–	12	.250	14	–	17	.452
Texas Tech ‍‍‍	2	–	14	.125	14	–	14	.500
† – Conference champion y- Invited to the NCAA Volleyball Tournament; As of December 18, 2014; Rankings from AVCA

== Season highlights ==
- The Longhorns won the Lobo Challenge & the 26 West Longhorn Classic with a 6–0 record. Even more impressive, they went 18–0 in the sets.
- The Longhorns clinched the Big 12 title with 3 conference games remaining by avenging their only conference loss.
- The Longhorns were awarded the #2 overall seed in the NCAA tournament.

== Roster ==
2014 Texas Longhorns roster
Defensive Specialist/Libero: 6 Kat Brooks - Junior; 8 Cat McCoy - Freshman; 9 Amy Neal - Junior; Setter: 21 Chloe Collins - Sophomore; Utility: 7 Nicole Dalton - Sophomore	Middle blockers: 1 Khat Bell - Senior; 5 Molly McCage - Junior; 11 Chiaka Ogbogu - Sophomore; 15 Sara Hattis - Junior; 17 Mirta Baselovic - Freshman	Outside hitters: 1 Khat Bell - Senior; 2 Tiffany Baker - Junior; 3 Pilar Victoria - Sophomore; 9 Amy Neal - Junior; 10 Haley Eckerman - Senior; 19 Paulina Prieto Cerame - Sophomore

== Schedule ==
Date Time	Opponent	Rank	Arena City (Tournament)	Television	Score	Attendance	Record (Big 12 Record)
8/29; 11:30 a.m.	vs. UTEP Lady Miners	#2	Johnson Center Gymnasium; Albuquerque, NM (Lobo Classic)		W 3-0 (25–23, 25–17, 25–10)	627	1-0
8/29; 8:30 p.m.	@ New Mexico	#2	Johnson Center Gymnasium; Albuquerque, NM (Lobo Classic)	MW Network	W 3-0 (25–21, 25–13, 25–17)	3,875	2-0
8/30; 4:30 p.m.	vs. Seattle	#2	Johnson Center Gymnasium; Albuquerque, NM (Lobo Classic)		W 3-0 (25–14, 25–12, 25–15)	N/A	3-0
9/6; 6:30 p.m.	@ #11 Florida	#3	O'Connell Center; Gainesville, FL	SEC+	W 3-1 (25–16, 26–28, 25–17, 25–16)	4,845	4-0
9/12; 7 p.m.	#21 Arizona	#2	Gregory Gymnasium; Austin, TX (26 West Classic)	LHN	W 3-0 (25–19, 25–21, 25–20)	3,072	5-0
9/13; 12 p.m.	UCF	#2	Gregory Gymnasium; Austin, TX (26 West Classic)	LHN	W 3-0 (25–17, 26–24, 25–9)	2,687	6-0
9/13; 3 p.m.	Florida A&M	#2	Gregory Gymnasium; Austin, TX (26 West Classic)	LHN	W 3-0 (25–18, 25–20, 25–13)	2,687	7-0
9/20; 2 p.m.	@ #9 Nebraska	#2	Devaney Sports Center; Lincoln, NE	NET/BTN+	W 3-2 (25–23, 21–25, 25–19, 23–25, 15–8)	8,312	8-0
9/24; 6 p.m.	*@ West Virginia	#2	WVU Coliseum; Morgantown, WV	ESPNU	W 3-2 (23–25, 19–25, 25–20, 25–18, 15–7)	1,914	9-0 (1–0)
10/01; 7 p.m.	*Iowa State	#2	Gregory Gymnasium; Austin, TX	LHN	W 3-0 (25–23, 25–15, 25–15)	2,899	10-0 (2–0)
10/05; 1 p.m.	*@ Kansas	#2	Horejsi Family Athletics Center; Lawrence, KS	FSN	W 3-1 (25–14, 25–20, 20–25, 25–21)	1,348	11-0 (3–0)
10/07; 7 p.m.	*Baylor	#2	Gregory Gymnasium; Austin, TX	LHN	W 3-0 (25–12, 25–13, 25–17)	2,504	12-0 (4–0)
10/09; 1 p.m.	*Texas Tech	#2	Gregory Gymnasium; Austin, TX	LHN	W 3-0 (25–19, 25–17, 25–19)	2,324	13-0 (5–0)
10/18; 7 p.m.	*@ #25 Kansas State	#2	Ahearn Field House; Manhattan, KS	FCSC	W 3-0 (25–19, 25–22, 25–12)	3,927	14-0 (6–0)
10/22; 7 p.m.	*TCU	#2	Gregory Gymnasium; Austin, TX	LHN	W 3-0 (25–14, 25–16, 25–22)	2,827	15-0 (7–0)
10/25; 5 p.m.	*Oklahoma	#2	Gregory Gymnasium; Austin, TX	LHN	L 0-3 (24–26, 24–26, 24–26)	4,402	15-1 (7–1)
10/27; 7 p.m.	Zhejiang	#5	Gregory Gymnasium; Austin, TX	LHN	W 3-0 (25–15, 26–24, 25–20)	1,869	Exhibition
10/28; 7 p.m.	Zhejiang	#5	Gregory Gymnasium; Austin, TX	LHN	W 3-2 (20–25, 25–18, 21–25, 25–19, 18–16)	2,079	Exhibition
11/02; 2 p.m.	*@ Iowa State	#5	Hilton Coliseum; Ames, IA	ESPNU	W 3-1 (25–21, 20–25, 25–13, 25–14)	4,345	16-1 (8–1)
11/05; 7 p.m.	*@ Texas Tech	#5	United Supermarkets Arena; Lubbock, TX	FSSW/FCSC	W 3-0 (25–10, 25–18, 25–13)	1,260	17-1 (9–1)
11/07; 7 p.m.	*Kansas State	#5	Gregory Gymnasium; Austin, TX	LHN	W 3-1 (16–25, 25–15, 25–21, 25–16)	3,516	18-1 (10–1)
11/12; 7 p.m.	*West Virginia	#5	Gregory Gymnasium; Austin, TX	LHN	W 3-0 (25–20, 25–17, 25–18)	2,306	19-1 (11–1)
11/15; 7 p.m.	*@ #24 Oklahoma	#5	McCasland Field House; Norman, OK	SoonerSports.tv	W 3-2 (22–25, 25–18, 21–25, 25–17, 15–5)	2,439	20-1 (12–1)
11/19; 7 p.m.	*@ Baylor	#3	Ferrell Center; Waco, TX	FSSW+/FCSA	W 3-1 (21–25, 25–14, 25–17, 25–19)	1,683	21-1 (13–1)
11/22; 3 p.m.	*Kansas	#3	Gregory Gymnasium; Austin, TX	LHN	W 3-0 (25–20, 25–23, 25–18)	N/A	22-1 (14–1)
11/26; 6:30 p.m.	*@ TCU	#3	Rec Center; Ft. Worth, TX	FSSW+	W 3-0 (25–17, 25–22, 25–18)	1,350	23-1 (15–1)
11/29; 1:30 p.m.	*#6 Florida	#3	Gregory Gymnasium; Austin, TX	LHN	L 2-3 (26–28, 25–20, 25–23, 22–25, 15–12)	4,276	23-2
2014 NCAA Tournament
12/4; 7:30 p.m.	y-Northwestern State	#6	Gregory Gymnasium; Austin, TX (NCAA 1st Round)	LHN	W 3-0 (25–21, 25–15, 25–18)	2,001	24-2
12/5; 8 p.m.	y-#22 Arizona State	#6	Gregory Gymnasium; Austin, TX (NCAA 2nd Round)	LHN	W 3-0 (25–19, 25–20, 25–22)	2,924	25-2
12/12; 4 p.m.	y-vs. #9 Colorado State	#6	Sports Pavilion; Minneapolis, MN (NCAA regional semifinal)	ESPN3	W 3-0 (25–19, 25–18, 25–17)	1,983	26-2
12/12; 5:30 p.m.	y-vs. #7 North Carolina	#6	Sports Pavilion; Minneapolis, MN (NCAA Regional final)	ESPNU	W 3-1	1,880	27-2
12/18; 6 p.m.	y-vs. #12 BYU	#6	Chesapeake Energy Arena; Oklahoma City, OK (NCAA Semifinal)	ESPN2	L 1-3 (23–25, 16–25, 25–17, 24–26)	9,824	27-3
* Indicates Conference Opponent, Times listed are Central Time Zone, Source

== Announcers for televised games ==
- @ New Mexico: JD Healy & Gale Trip
- @ Tennessee: Larry Vettel & Missy Whittemore
- Arizona: Paul Sunderland & Nell Fortner
- UCF: Paul Sunderland & Nell Fortner
- Florida A&M: Paul Sunderland & Nell Fortner
- @ Nebraska: Larry Punteney & Kathi Wieskamp
- @ West Virginia: Sam Gore & Dain Blanton
- Iowa State: Tyler Denning & Nell Fortner
- @ Kansas: Bill Ferguson & Anne Marie Anderson
- Baylor: Tyler Denning & Nell Fortner
- Texas Tech: Tyler Denning & Nell Fortner
- @ Kansas State: Brian Smoller & Kelsey Stringer
- TCU: Tyler Denning & Nell Fortner
- Oklahoma: Paul Sunderland & Nell Fortner
- Zhejiang: Paul Sunderland & Nell Fortner
- Zhejiang: Paul Sunderland & Nell Fortner
- @ Iowa State: Sam Gore & Dain Blanton
- @ Texas Tech: Robert Giovanetti & Andy Penney
- Kansas State: Paul Sunderland & Nell Fortner
- West Virginia: Tyler Denning & Nell Fortner
- @ Oklahoma: Bruce Haertl & Laura Alford
- @ Baylor: John Morris & Kristen Bates
- Kansas: Paul Sunderland & Nell Fortner
- @ TCU: Chuck LaMendola & Pam Lea
- Florida: Paul Sunderland & Nell Fortner
- Northwestern State: Paul Sunderland & Nell Fortner
- Arizona State: Paul Sunderland & Nell Fortner
- vs. Colorado State: Paul Sunderland & Maria Taylor
- vs. North Carolina: Paul Sunderland & Maria Taylor
- vs. BYU: Beth Mowins, Karch Kiraly, & Holly Rowe
