= Tresa (name) =

Tresa may refer to the following people:

Given name

- Tresa Glenn Protzman (Born 1964), Philanthropist, Producer, Writer, 1980's model and American descendant of William Wallace, Augustine Washington, Old Tassel Reyetaeh ...
- Tresa Hughes (1929–2011), American stage, film and television actress
- Tresa Spaulding Hamson, American basketball player

Surname

- Catherine Tresa (born 1989), Indian film actress and model
