= Tresa Spaulding Hamson =

American basketball player

Personal information
- Listed height: 6 ft 7 in (2.01 m)

Career information
- College: Brigham Young University
- Position: Center

Career history
- 1983, 1985: World University games team
Medals
Women's basketball
Representing the United States
World University Games
Gold medal – first place	1983 Edmonton	Team competition
Gold medal – first place	1985 Kobe	Team competition

Tresa Spaulding Hamson was an American basketball player for the BYU Cougars women's basketball team from 1983 to 1987. She was raised in Meridian, Idaho.

Her freshman year, she was named to the Women's Basketball Yearbook All-American honors first team and was a Street & Smith All-American honorable mention. As a sophomore, she was named First Team All-HCAC, Kodak Division I All-District VII, and American Women's Sports Federation fourth team All-America. Her junior year she was ranked third in the nation for points per game (25.2 average) and seventh in field goal percentage (.636). That same year she also earned HCAC Player of the Year honors and was named Kodak Division I All-District VII. Her senior year, she had the highest points per game in the nation, averaging 28.9, and was also second in the nation in field goal percentage (.652). She again earned the HCAC Player of the Year award, claimed her third straight Kodak Division I District VII award, and was named AWSF First Team All-America, with the designation of "Best Center in America".

During her collegiate career, she also participated as an alternate for the Team USA at the 1984 Olympics. After college, she played two seasons in Europe. In 1998, she was inducted into the BYU Hall of Fame.

Hamson earned two degrees from Brigham Young University: a bachelor's degree in youth leadership, and a master's degree in physical education. Her daughter Jennifer, 6 ft 7 in (201 cm) also played for BYU, starring in both basketball and volleyball. Her son Alan, who stands 7 ft 3 in (221 cm), joined BYU's basketball team as a walk-on in 2015. Several brothers, sisters, and other family members of Hamson also played for BYU or other teams.

Hamson still holds many records at BYU, including the following:

Place	Record Name	Record
Second	Career points	2,309
Second	Career scoring average	23.4
Second	Career rebounds	980
First	field goal percentage (minimum 150 attempts)	.609
First	Career blocked shots	494
First	Points in a single game	50 vrs UNM 1987
Second	Points in a single game	50 vrs UNM 1987
First	Blocks in a single game	11 vrs Houston in 1986
Third	Season scoring average	29.8 1986-1987 (also led the nation that season)

== USA Basketball ==
Spaulding played on the 1983 World University games team, coached by Jill Hutchison. She helped the team win the gold medal for the USA team.

Spaulding played for the USA World University Games team in Kobe, Japan in 1985. The team brought home a silver medal, after falling to the USSR. The team trailed by 18 points at one time, mounted a comeback attempt but fell short, losing 87–81. Spaulding averaged 1.0 point per game.
