= Megan Moody =

British basketball player (born 1983)

Geelong United
- Title: Head coach
- League: NBL1 South

Personal information
- Born: 3 November 1983 (age 43) Melbourne, Victoria, Australia
- Listed height: 1.88 m (6 ft 2 in)

Career information
- High school: Frankston (Melbourne, Victoria)
- College: Tulsa (2002–2006)
- WNBA draft: 2006: undrafted
- Playing career: 2000–2011
- Position: Shooting guard / Small forward
- Coaching career: 2017–present

Career history

Playing
- 2000: Nunawading Spectres
- 2001: Knox Raiders
- 2006: Knox Raiders
- 2006–2007: Fenerbahçe
- 2007: CB Islas Canarias
- 2007–2008: AE Sedis Bàsquet
- 2008–2009: Pallacanestro Ribera
- 2009: Dandenong Rangers (SEABL)
- 2009–2010: Dandenong Rangers
- 2011: Bendigo Braves

Coaching
- 2017–2019: Bendigo Spirit (assistant)
- 2018–2019: Bendigo Braves
- 2025–present: Geelong United
- 2025–2026: Geelong Venom

Career highlights
- As player: Second-team All-C-USA (2006); As coach: SEABL champion (2018); NBL1 South Coach of the Year (2025)

Megan Janelle Moody (born 3 November 1983) is an Australian-British former professional basketball player.

== Early life and career ==
Moody was born in Melbourne, Victoria, in the suburb of Kew. She grew up in Frankston and attended Frankston High School.

In 2000, Moody played for the Nunawading Spectres in the South East Australian Basketball League (SEABL). She helped the Spectres reach the Grand Final of the Australian Basketball Association (ABA) National Finals, where they finished as runners-up. In 2001, she played for the Knox Raiders in the SEABL.

== College career ==
Moody played college basketball for Tulsa between 2002 and 2006.

== Professional career ==
After going undrafted in the 2006 WNBA draft, Moody joined the Houston Comets, where she played one preseason game. She later played for the Knox Raiders during the 2006 SEABL season.

Moody split the 2006–07 season with Fenerbahçe in Turkey and CB Islas Canarias in Spain. She continued in Spain in 2007–08 with AE Sedis Bàsquet. In 2008–09, she played in Italy for Pallacanestro Ribera.

In 2009, Moody played for the Dandenong Rangers in the SEABL. She subsequently joined the Dandenong Rangers WNBL team for the 2009–10 WNBL season.

Moody was on the Bendigo Spirit roster in 2010–11, but she did not play. Her final playing stint came during the 2011 SEABL season with the Bendigo Braves.

== National team career ==
Moody played for the Great Britain women's national basketball team in 2007 and 2009.

== Coaching career ==
In 2017, Moody joined the Bendigo Spirit of the WNBL as an assistant coach. She became head coach of the Bendigo Braves women in the SEABL in 2018 and guided the team to the 2018 SEABL Championship. She continued in both roles until 2019, when she stepped down following the 2019 NBL1 season to focus on her new role with Basketball Victoria as the high-performance coordinator for Bendigo's hub.

Moody became the head coach of the Geelong United women's team in the NBL1 South for the 2025 NBL1 season. She was named NBL1 South Coach of the Year. She helped the team reach the NBL1 South Grand Final, where they lost to the Knox Raiders.

In September 2025, Moody joined the Geelong Venom as an assistant coach for the 2025–26 WNBL season.

In February 2026, Moody was re-appointed head coach of the Geelong United women's team for the 2026 NBL1 South season.

== Personal life ==
Moody is the daughter of Michael and Mary-Ann Moody. She is one of three children.

Moody holds Scottish nationality.
