= Rebecca Ott =

Australian-New Zealand basketball player

No. 6 – Melbourne Boomers
- Position: Guard
- League: WNBL

Personal information
- Born: 9 August 1994 (age 32) Melbourne, Victoria
- Listed height: 6 ft 0 in (1.83 m)

Career information
- High school: Box Hill Senior Secondary College (Melbourne, Victoria)
- Playing career: 2016–present

Career history
- 2016–present: Melbourne Boomers

Rebecca Katherine Ott (born 9 August 1994) is an Australian-New Zealand professional basketball player and Australian rules footballer.

== Basketball career ==
=== WNBL ===
After impressive performances for the Knox Raiders in the semi-professional Big V competition, Ott was signed by the Melbourne Boomers for the 2016–17 season. In March 2017, Ott was re-signed for her second season with the Boomers after strong showings in her debut season. This season, Ott will play alongside the likes of Liz Cambage & Jenna O'Hea.

=== National team ===
Due to her New Zealand parentage, Ott was encouraged to attend the Tall Ferns training camp by her Boomers and Tall Ferns assistant coach, Guy Molloy. Ott has been selected in the final roster for the 2017 FIBA Asia Women's Cup, there she will make her international debut.

== Australian rules football career ==
Ott was elevated to the St Kilda squad as an injury replacement player before the 2021 AFL Women's season. She made her AFLW debut in the round 4 match against Geelong. Her season was ended a few weeks later when she injured her knee playing in the VFL Women's league. In June 2021, she extended her contract by a year.
