= Rosemary Fadljevic =

Australian basketball player

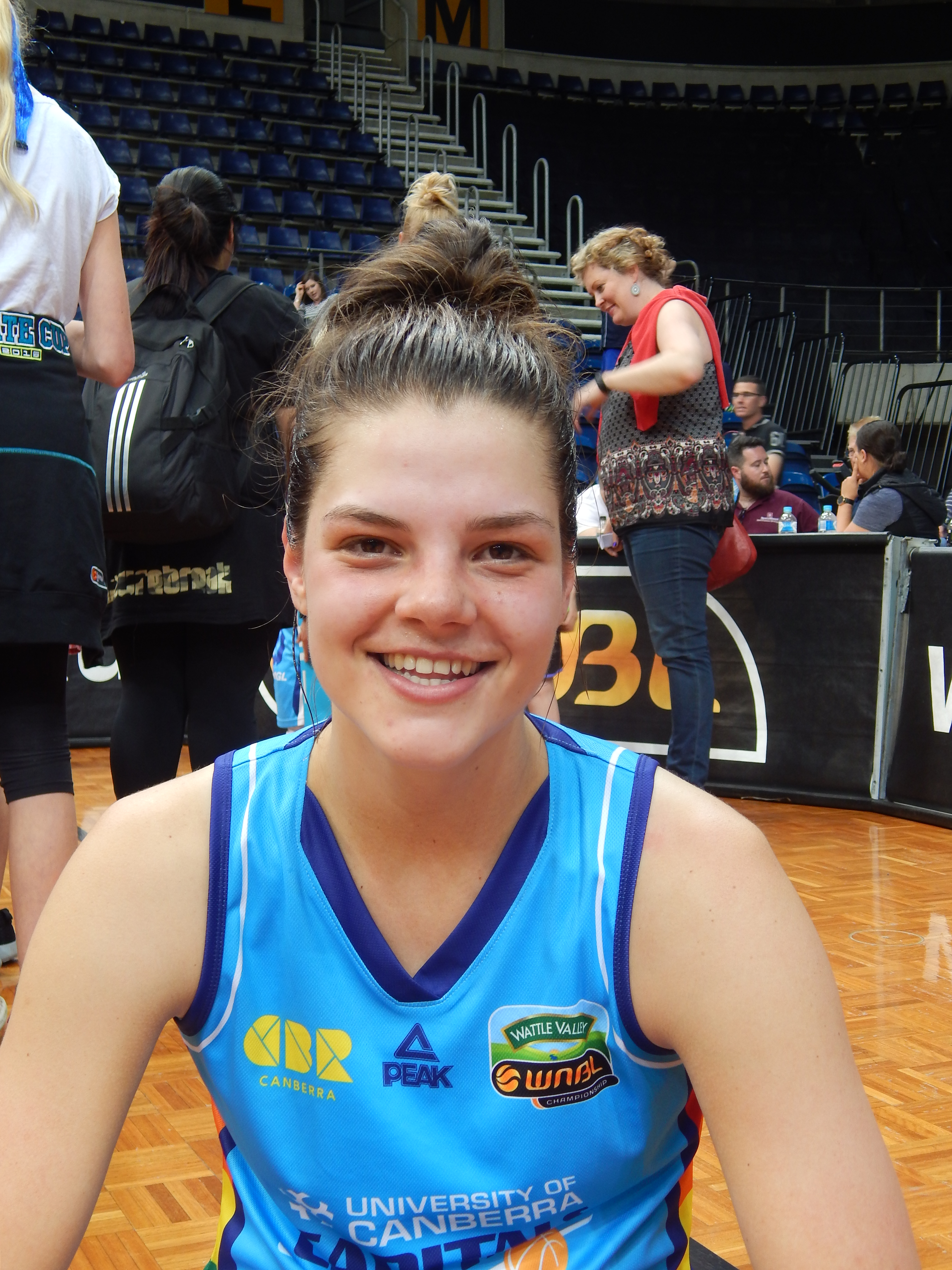

Dandenong Rangers
- Position: Forward
- League: WNBL

Personal information
- Born: 17 September 1993 (age 33) Dandenong, Victoria
- Listed height: 6 ft 0 in (1.83 m)

Career information
- Playing career: 2011–present

Career history
- 2011–2012: Australian Institute of Sport
- 2012–2013: Dandenong Rangers
- 2013–2015: Townsville Fire
- 2015–2016: Canberra Capitals
- 2016–present: Dandenong Rangers

Career highlights
- WNBL champion (2015)
Medals
Representing Australia
Basketball
Youth Olympic Games
Silver medal – second place	2010 Singapore	Team
FIBA U16 Oceania Championship
Gold medal – first place	2009 Australia	Team

Rosemary Fadljevic (born 17 September 1993) is an Australian basketball player for the Dandenong Rangers in the Women's National Basketball League.

== Career ==
=== WNBL ===
Fadljevic began her professional career in 2011, for the Australian Institute of Sport. Fadljevic has spent time with several WNBL teams in her young career. After the AIS, Fadljevic was signed by her home town club, the Dandenong Rangers. After a one-season stint with the Rangers, Fadljevic travelled north to play with the Townsville Fire. In her second season with the Fire, she took home her first WNBL championship alongside the likes of Suzy Batkovic. She then signed with the Canberra Capitals for the 2015–16 season. For the 2016–17 season, she returned to Victoria, home to the Rangers.

== National team ==
=== Youth Level ===
Fadljevic made her international debut at the inaugural FIBA Oceania Under-16 Championship in Brisbane, Australia, where she helped Australia take home gold and qualify for the world championship. Fadljevic would then go on to participate in the inaugural 2010 Summer Youth Olympics in Singapore, in the girls 3x3 basketball event, where Australia placed in second, taking home silver.
