= Sarah Elsworthy =

Australian basketball player (1998-)

No. 7 – Geelong United
- Position: Guard
- League: WNBL

Personal information
- Born: 29 May 1998 (age 28) North Adelaide, South Australia, Australia
- Listed height: 5 ft 7.5 in (1.71 m)

Career information
- Playing career: 2016–present

Career history
- 2016–2018; 2019–2020: Adelaide Lightning
- 2024–present: Geelong United

Sarah Annie Elsworthy (born 29 May 1998) is an Australian professional basketball player.

== Career ==
=== WNBL ===
Elsworthy debuted in the WNBL for the Adelaide Lightning in the 2016–17 season. She played a second season for the Lightning in 2017–18 and a third season in 2019–20. She joined Geelong United for the 2024–25 WNBL season.

=== NBL1 ===
In 2026, Elsworthy won the NBL1 South Golden Hands Award while playing for the Eltham Wildcats.
