= Chelsea Brook =

Australian basketball player

Personal information
- Born: 29 July 1998 (age 28) Truro, South Australia, Australia
- Listed height: 189 cm (6 ft 2 in)
- Listed weight: 80 kg (176 lb)

Career information
- Playing career: 2016–present
- Position: Power forward / Centre

Career history
- 2016–2017: Norwood Flames
- 2016–2023: Adelaide Lightning
- 2018: Sturt Sabres
- 2019: Eltham Wildcats
- 2021: Mackay Meteorettes
- 2022–2023: Darwin Salties
- 2024; 2026: Mackay Meteorettes

Career highlights
- NBL1 North champion (2026); Premier League champion (2016)

Chelsea Abbey Brook (born 29 July 1998) is an Australian professional basketball player.

== Early life ==
Brook hails from country South Australia in Truro.

== Career ==
=== WNBL ===
Brook made her debut in the WNBL with the Adelaide Lightning in the 2016–17 season. She re-signed with the Lightning for the 2017–18 season. She continued with the Lightning in 2018–19, 2019–20, the 2020 Hub season, and again in 2021–22 and 2022–23.

=== State Leagues ===
In 2016 and 2017, Brook played for the Norwood Flames in the South Australian Premier League, winning a championship in her first season. In 2018, she continued in the Premier League for the Sturt Sabes. In 2019, she played in the inaugural NBL1 season with the Eltham Wildcats. In 2021, she played for the Mackay Meteorettes in the NBL1 North.

Brook played for the Darwin Salties of the NBL1 North in 2022 and 2023.

In 2024, Brook returned to the Mackay Meteorettes of the NBL1 North. After not playing in 2025, she re-joined the Meteorettes for the 2026 NBL1 season and helped Mackay win the NBL1 North championship.

=== National team ===
In 2017, Brook played for the Australian National University Team at the World University Games in Taipei, where Australia won gold.
