= Colleen Planeta =

American basketball player

No. 42 – Sydney Uni Flames
- Position: Forward
- League: WNBL

Personal information
- Born: September 3, 1988 (age 38) Surprise, Arizona, U.S.
- Listed height: 6 ft 2 in (1.88 m)

Career information
- High school: Willow Canyon
- College: Point Loma (2006–2010)
- WNBA draft: 2010: undrafted
- Playing career: 2010–present

Career history
- 2010–2011: Barcelos
- 2011–2012: Ano Liosia
- 2012–2013: Saarlouis Royals
- 2014–2016: Hume City Broncos
- 2015–2016: Etzella Ettelbruck
- 2016–2019: Adelaide Lightning
- 2019–present: Sydney Uni Flames

Career highlights
- Luxembourg Cup champion (2016); Big V champion (2014); 2× Big V Most Valuable Player (2014, 2015); 2× Big V All-Star Five (2014, 2015); Big V Defensive Player of the Year (2014)

Colleen Planeta (born September 3, 1988) is an American professional basketball player.

== Career ==
=== College ===
Planeta played college basketball at Point Loma Nazarene University for the Point Loma Sea Lions in San Diego, California.

=== Europe ===
Since leaving college, Planeta played in several different leagues across Europe. Lee played in nations such as Portugal, Greece, Germany and Luxembourg. Taking home the Cup championship in her latter season stint in Luxembourg.

=== Australia ===
Planeta first signed in Victoria, Australia for the Hume City Broncos in the Big V league. Prior to this, she had just finished her season in Germany and was considering retirement. Her presence with the Broncos has been instrumental to their success and since her signing, she was won many awards for her play in the league. Due to her presence and dominance in the league, Planeta was signed by the Adelaide Lightning for the 2016–17 season. The WNBL will be the highest level of basketball she has played at in her career. Planeta was awarded a place in the WNBL's Round 13 Team of the Week as recognition of her excellent performances in Adelaide's two wins of that round.
