= Amelia Todhunter =

Australian basketball player

Personal information
- Born: 21 May 1988 (age 38) Albury, New South Wales, Australia
- Listed height: 5 ft 5 in (1.65 m)

Career information
- Playing career: 2007–2026
- Position: Guard

Career history
- 2007–2010: Dandenong Rangers
- 2010–2012: Bulleen Boomers
- 2012–2013: West Coast Waves
- 2013–2015: Melbourne Boomers
- 2015–2019: Dandenong Rangers
- 2020–2021: Bendigo Spirit

Career highlights
- WNBL champion (2011)

Amelia Todhunter (born 21 May 1988) is an Australian former professional basketball player. Her accolades include a WNBL and NBL1 National Championship.

== Early life ==
Todhunter was born in Albury, New South Wales.

== Professional career ==
=== WNBL ===
Todhunter began her professional career in 2007, for the Dandenong Rangers. She would then move to the Bulleen Boomers and help the team win their first ever championship in the 2011 Grand Final. After a brief stint in the west, she returned to Victoria to suit up for the rebranded Melbourne Boomers. After two seasons with the Boomers, she returned to her roots, rejoining the Dandenong Rangers. Todhunter was resigned for the 2016–17 season, her second consecutive season with the Rangers and fifth overall.

In 2020, Todhunter returned to the league after a one-year absence, signing with the Bendigo Spirit for the 2020–21 season.

In addition to her 246 WNBL games, Amelia has also spent 15+ years of her professional career competing in Australia's second-tier competition (SEABL / NBL1) which sees her currently the co-captain with the Waverly Falcons for the 2023 and 2024 NBL1 season. In 2024, Amelia lead the Waverly Falcons to an NBL1 (South) championship over the Keilor Thunder (87–82). The Falcons then went on to become NBL1 National Champions, defeating Bendigo Braves 97–49.

In August 2026, Todhunter announced her retirement from basketball after approximately 750 games over 20 years across NBL1, SEABL and the WNBL.
