= Stephanie Blicavs =

Australian basketball player

Southside Flyers
- Position: Guard
- League: WNBL

Personal information
- Born: 26 July 1990 (age 36) Dandenong, Victoria
- Listed height: 5 ft 10 in (1.78 m)

Career information
- Playing career: 2006–present

Career history
- 2006–2007: Dandenong Rangers
- 2007–2009: Australian Institute of Sport
- 2009–2013: Dandenong Rangers
- 2013–2015: Townsville Fire
- 2015–2018: Dandenong Rangers
- 2018–2019: Adelaide Lightning
- 2020–present: Southside Flyers

Career highlights
- 3x WNBL champion (2012, 2015, 2020); WNBL Defensive Player of the Year (2016); SEABL MVP (2015); 2x All-SEABL Women's Team (2013, 2015)

Stephanie Blicavs (née Cumming; born 26 July 1990) is an Australian professional basketball player.

== Career ==
=== WNBL ===
Raised in Dandenong and playing for Rangers junior team, Blicavs joined the WNBL squad in 2006. She then gained a scholarship Australian Institute of Sport and joined the WNBL team. She then returned home to play for the Rangers and won a championship in 2012. She then travelled north to play for the Townsville Fire. She once again won the championship title in the 2015 final. For 2015–16 she returned home where she would Captain the Rangers season.

In 2020, Blicavs signed on for her first season since pregnancy, returning to Melbourne for her first season with the rebranded Southside Flyers.

=== SEABL ===
During the WNBL off-season, Blicavs has regularly played in the South East Australian Basketball League. From 2010–2012 she played for the Dandenong Rangers SEABL team as well as the WNBL side. In 2013, she joined the Frankston Blues. In 2014, she took her talents to the Ballarat Rush. In 2015, Blicavs played for the Kilsyth Cobras and led them to the Grand Final where she would go down to her hometown team, Dandenong. Despite losing the final, Blicavs took home the 2015 SEABL MVP award.

== Personal life ==
In March 2017, Blicavs married the brother of her team mate Sara Blicavs, fellow basketballer, Kris. On 4 October 2019, Blicavs gave birth to her first child, Arlo. On 27 April 2022, she gave birth to a girl, Etta.
