= Larissa Anderson =

Australian basketball player (born 1977)

Melbourne Boomers
- Title: Assistant Coach
- League: WNBL

Personal information
- Born: 27 March 1977 (age 49) Sydney, New South Wales
- Listed height: 5 ft 11 in (1.80 m)

Career information
- Playing career: 1995–2008
- Position: Forward / Center
- Number: 10
- Coaching career: 2015–present

Career history

Playing
- 1995: Dandenong Rangers
- 1997: Bulleen Boomers
- 1998: Brisbane Blazers
- 1998–2006: Bulleen Boomers
- 2006–2008: Dandenong Rangers

Coaching
- 2015–2019: Dandenong Rangers
- 2019–present: Melbourne Boomers (assistant)

Larissa Anne Anderson (née Cavanagh; born 27 March 1977) is a former Australian professional basketball player. She currently is an assistant coach for the Melbourne Boomers in the WNBL.

== Career ==
=== WNBL ===
Anderson grew up in Victoria and played for the Nunawading Spectres before joining the Dandenong Rangers WNBL team in 1995. Anderson had a strong career through until 2008 playing for Brisbane, Bulleen & again Dandenong. After seven years away from the WNBL and coaching success in the SEABL, Anderson has returned to the WNBL and to Dandenong as the head coach of the team for the 2015–16 season. She won the WNBL Coach of the Month award twice in her first season. After spending four years in the head coach role at Dandenong, Anderson was not re-appointed when the franchise was rebranded for the 2019–20 season.

In July 2019, Anderson joined the Melbourne Boomers as an assistant coach under Guy Molloy. Anderson was appointed to also focus on the new Boomers Academy program for up-and-coming player development.

== Coaching record ==
Legend
Regular season	G	Games coached	W	Games won	L	Games lost	W–L %	Win–loss %
Playoffs	PG	Playoff games	PW	Playoff wins	PL	Playoff losses	PW–L %	Playoff win–loss %

=== WNBL ===
Team	Year	G	W	L	W–L%	Finish	PG	PW	PL	PW–L%	Result
Dandenong	2015–16	24	15	9	.625	3rd of 9	1	0	1	.000	Lost Semi-final
Dandenong	2016–17	24	15	9	.625	2nd of 8	5	2	3	.400	Lost Grand Final
Dandenong	2017–18	21	7	14	.333	7th of 8	–	–	–	–	
Dandenong	2018–19	21	9	12	.429	5th of 8	–	–	–	–	
Career		90	46	44	.511		6	2	4	.333	
