= Aimie Rocci =

Australian basketball player

No. 3 – Southside Flyers
- Position: Guard
- League: WNBL

Personal information
- Born: 21 September 1993 (age 33) Noble Park, Victoria
- Listed height: 5 ft 10 in (1.78 m)

Career information
- Playing career: 2010–present

Career history
- 2010–2017: Dandenong Rangers
- 2017–2019: Adelaide Lightning
- 2019–2023: Southside Flyers
- 2023–present: Melbourne Boomers

Career highlights
- 2x WNBL Champion (2012, 2020)
Medals
Representing Australia
Basketball
Summer Universiade
Gold medal – first place	2017 Taiwan	Team
FIBA Oceania Junior Championships
Gold medal – first place	2010 New Zealand	U19 Team

Aimie Rocci (née Clydesdale; born 21 September 1993) is an Australian basketball player who plays for the Melbourne Boomers in the Women's National Basketball League.

== Professional career ==
=== WNBL ===
Rocci made her Women's National Basketball League debut in 2010, for the Dandenong Rangers. She has since remained a consistent member of their roster. She was a member of the Rangers, 2011–12 championship winning team. In May 2016, Rocci was re-signed by the Rangers for two more seasons. Rocci will head to South Australia for the 2017–18 season, after signing with the Adelaide Lightning for two seasons.

== National team ==
Rocci was a consistent member of the Australian's women's junior teams. She represented Australia at the inaugural FIBA Under-17 World Championship for Women in Toulouse, France where Australia placed seventh. She was then named to the Gems squad and helped them take home the Gold at the Oceania Under-18 Championship and qualify for the World Championship the following year in Chile. Rocci was once again named to this squad, where they were narrowly defeated in the Bronze medal match by Brazil, finishing the tournament placed fourth.

== Personal life ==
She was a student at Monash University, Endeavour Hills, Victoria, Australia, 2015-2018.
