= Jennifer Hamson =

American volleyball and basketball player (born 1992)

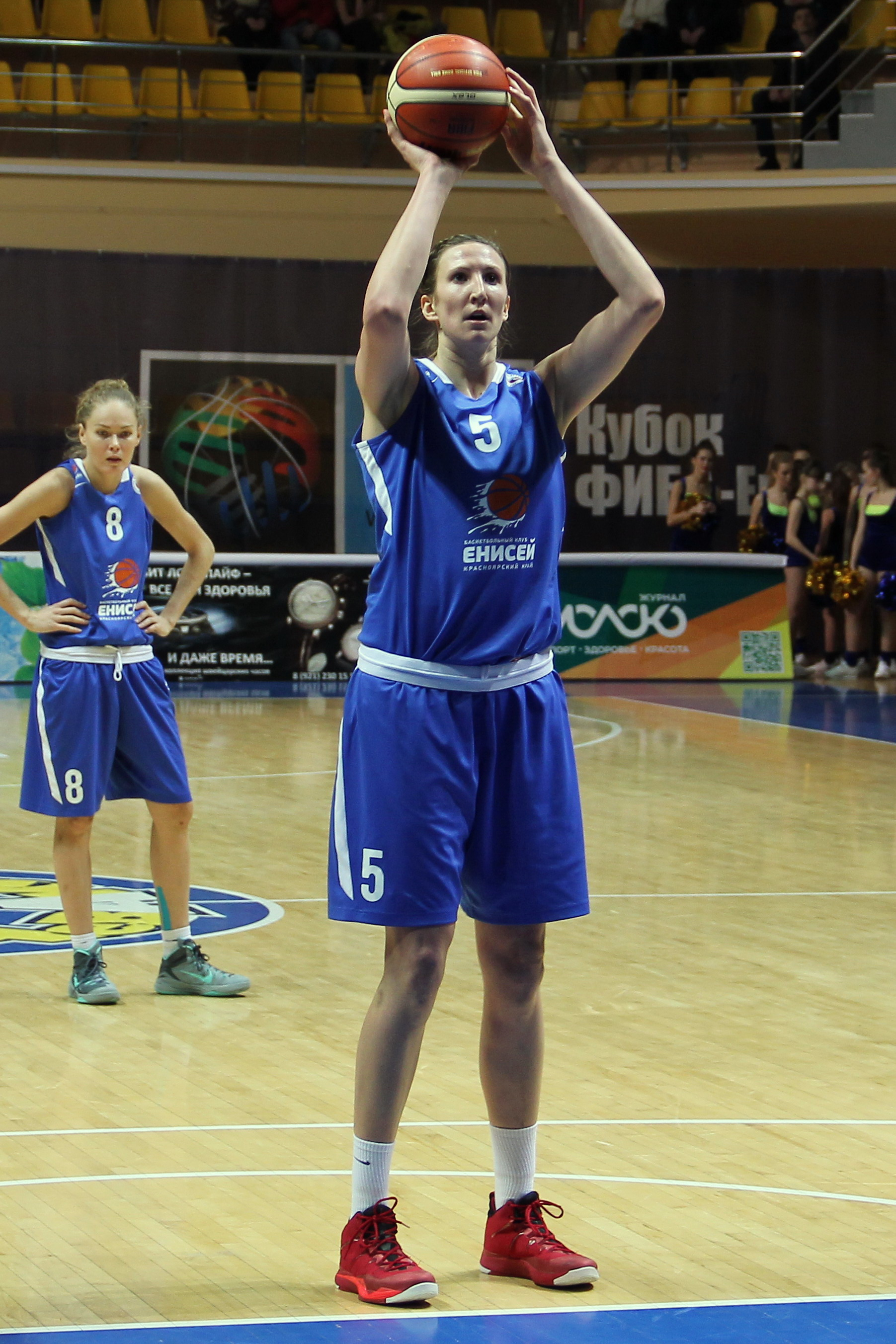

Personal information
- Born: January 23, 1992 (age 34) Lindon, Utah, U.S.
- Listed height: 6 ft 7 in (2.01 m)
- Listed weight: 210 lb (95 kg)

Career information
- High school: Pleasant Grove (Pleasant Grove, Utah)
- College: BYU (2010–2014)
- WNBA draft: 2014: 2nd round, 23rd overall pick
- Drafted by: Los Angeles Sparks
- Playing career: 2015–2018
- Position: Center

Career history
- 2015: Los Angeles Sparks
- 2015–2016: BC Enisey
- 2016–2018: Sydney Uni Flames
- 2017: Indiana Fever

Career highlights
- WNBL champion (2017); WCC Player of the Year (2014); WCC Defensive Player of the Year (2014); 2x All-WCC (2013, 2014)
- Stats at Basketball Reference

Jennifer Hamson (born January 23, 1992) is an American professional volleyball player and former basketball player. She was also an All-American player for the Brigham Young University Cougars volleyball team.

== Early career ==
Hamson grew up in Lindon, Utah. She attended Pleasant Grove High School, where she was an all-state basketball selection and a member of the state championship volleyball team. She also played for the Utah Elite club volleyball team. Hamson was recruited to play volleyball by the University of Utah, Colorado State, Utah State, Long Beach State, University of Louisville, and UNLV.

== College ==
Hamson was a dual sport athlete at Brigham Young University (BYU) in Provo, Utah. She led the Cougars to a sweet sixteen appearance in the 2014 NCAA tournament, only the third #12 seed to ever make it that far. As a senior, she averaged 18 points, 11 rebounds and led the nation with 147 blocked shots. She was named an Associated Press All-America Honorable Mention recipient and was the WCC Player and Defensive Player of the Year, the first time in league history that the honor has gone to the same student-athlete.

== Career statistics ==
Legend
GP	Games played	GS	Games started	MPG	Minutes per game	RPG	Rebounds per game
APG	Assists per game	SPG	Steals per game	BPG	Blocks per game	PPG	Points per game
TO	Turnovers per game	FG%	Field-goal percentage	3P%	3-point field-goal percentage	FT%	Free-throw percentage
**Bold**	Career best	°	League leader

=== WNBA ===
==== Regular season ====
WNBA regular season statistics
Year	Team	GP	GS	MPG	FG%	3P%	FT%	RPG	APG	SPG	BPG	TO	PPG
2014	Did not appear in league												
2015	Los Angeles	**25**	2	6.5	55.2	—	27.6	1.5	0.2	**0.2**	0.5	**0.2**	1.6
2016	Did not play (waived)												
2017	Indiana	12	0	**7.2**	**55.6**	—	**85.7**	**2.1**	0.2	0.1	**0.9**	0.4	**2.2**
**Career**	2 years, 2 teams	37	2	6.7	55.3	—	38.9	1.7	0.2	0.2	0.6	0.3	1.8

=== College ===
NCAA statistics
Year	Team	GP	Points	FG%	3P%	FT%	RPG	APG	SPG	BPG	PPG
2010-11	BYU	30	231	55.9%	—	73.9%	5.1	0.1	0.2	1.5	7.7
2011-12	BYU	31	295	**57.9%**	0.0%	**75.3%**	5.7	0.5	0.5	2.5	9.5
2012-13	BYU	26	290	51.5%	—	63.2%	8.8	0.7	**0.8**	2.8	11.2
2013-14	BYU	**35**	**621**	56.6%	0.0%	71.5%	**11.5**	**1.0**	0.5	**4.2**	**17.7**
**Career**		122	1437	55.5%	0.0%	71.2%	7.9	0.6	0.5	2.8	11.8

== WNBA career ==
Following her collegiate career, Hamson was selected 23rd overall (2nd round) in the 2014 WNBA draft by the Los Angeles Sparks, despite telling teams that she would defer playing a year to complete her volleyball commitments. Hamson signed with the Sparks on February 23, 2015 after sitting out the 2014 WNBA season.

== Volleyball career ==
Hamson chose to defer playing in the WNBA so she could attend the U.S. Collegiate National Volleyball Team camp during the summer of 2014. She completed her eligibility by competing with the BYU volleyball team for the fall 2014 season. Hamson was named an All American for volleyball after the Cougars run to the Sweet Sixteen in 2013.

After leaving basketball, Hamson returned to playing volleyball, by then also professionally. In November 2018, she was signed by German Women's Volleyball League (Frauen-Volleyball-Bundesliga) club VC Wiesbaden to replace compatriot Holly Toliver. She said, "My love for volleyball has never gone away and I worked hard for a successful start in this great sport. I am very happy and grateful that I will get the chance to prove this at VC Wiesbaden. Also, this is really a beautiful city." Wiesbaden advanced to the DVV-Pokal Frauen (Women's German Cup) and Frauen-Bundesliga quarterfinals in the 2018–19 season but was swept in both by eventual league champions Allianz MTV Stuttgart, to which she signed for the succeeding season. With Hanson, Stuttgart reached the 2020 DVV-Pokal final but lost to Dresdner SC women's volleyball team. At the time the 2019–20 Bundesliga season was curtailed before the playoffs, Stuttgart stood at second place in the table. She eventually parted ways with the club.

== Personal life ==
Hamson is a daughter of David and Tresa Spaulding Hamson, who played basketball at BYU.

== Awards and honors ==
=== Basketball ===
- WCC player of the year (2014)
- WCC defensive player of the year (2014)

=== Volleyball ===
- WCC player of the Year (2013)
- All-WCC First Team (2013)
- All-Pacific Region First Team (2013)
- AVCA All-America First Team (2013)
