= Shanae Greaves =

Australian basketball player

No. 8 – Sydney Uni Flames
- Position: Forward
- League: WNBL

Personal information
- Born: 8 April 1993 (age 33) Knox, Victoria
- Listed height: 6 ft 1 in (1.85 m)

Career information
- Playing career: 2013–present

Career history
- 2013–2016: Melbourne Boomers
- 2016–present: Sydney Uni Flames

Career highlights
- WNBL champion (2017)

Shanae Greaves (born 8 April 1993) is an Australian professional basketball player who played for the Sydney Uni Flames in the Women's National Basketball League.

== Professional career ==
=== WNBL ===
After strong showings in the SEABL, Greaves began gaining more attention and before long found herself on the Melbourne Boomers roster. Greaves then made her professional debut with the Boomers in 2013. She has since continued on for two more seasons with the Boomers. Greaves has been signed by the Sydney Uni Flames for the 2016–17 season.

== Personal life ==
Shanae Greaves was born in Melbourne Australia. She has two parents and two brothers. In 2015 Shanae moved to Sydney to play basketball for the Sydney Uni Flames. It was there that she met her best friend Pippa Temperley with who she started a successful fitness and lifestyle Instagram page. Shanae attributes much of her success to Pippa and notes "honestly I wouldn't be the person I am today without Pippa, she is the best friend I could ever ask for".
