= List of 2015–16 WNBL season signings =

2015–16 WNBL season
- League: WNBL
- Sport: Basketball

WNBL seasons
- ← 2014–15 2016–17 →

This is a list of all personnel changes that occurred during the 2015 Women's National Basketball League (WNBL) off-season and 2015–16 WNBL season.

== Incoming Player Movement ==
=== Re-signings ===
Team	Player	Nationality
Adelaide Lightning	Jessica Good; Tara Robinson	Australia; Australia
Bendigo Spirit	Heather Oliver; Jane Chalmers; Andrea Wilson	Australia; Australia; Australia
Canberra Capitals	Stephanie Talbot; Abigail Wehrung; Alice Coddington; Ellie Junod; Carly Wilson; Hanna Zavecz; Abby Bishop	Australia; Australia; Australia; Australia; Australia; Australia; Australia
Dandenong Rangers	Aimie Clydesdale; Lauren Scherf; Annalise Pickrel; Chloe Bibby; Alison Downie	Australia; Australia; United States; Australia; Australia
Melbourne Boomers	Tess Madgen; Olivia Thompson; Rebecca Cole; Shanae Greaves	Australia; Australia; Australia; Australia
Perth Lynx (formerly West Coast Waves)	Louella Tomlinson; Antonia Edmondson	Australia; New Zealand
Sydney Uni Flames	Katie-Rae Ebzery; Tahlia Tupaea; Rohanee Cox; Hayley Moffatt; Nicole How; Kathryn Rendell; Kate Seebohm	Australia; Australia; Australia; Australia; United Kingdom; Australia; Australia
Townsville Fire	Cayla George; Kate Gaze; Mia Murray; Micaela Cocks; Jacqui Zelenka	Australia; Australia; Australia; New Zealand; Australia

=== Internal signings ===
New Team	Player	Nationality	Former team
Adelaide Lightning	Leilani Mitchell; Mikaela Ruef; Kelly Bowen; Mikaela Dombkins; Mikayla Pirini	Australia; United States; Australia; Australia; Australia	Sydney; Sydney; Melbourne; Canberra; West Coast
Bendigo Spirit	Kerryn Harrington; Sarah McAppion	Australia; Australia	Adelaide; Canberra
Canberra Capitals	Rosemary Fadljevic; DeNesha Stallworth	Australia; United States	Townsville; South East Queensland
Dandenong Rangers	Stephanie Cumming; Alexandra Bunton; Sara Blicavs; Amelia Todhunter	Australia; Australia; Australia; Australia	Townsville; Adelaide; Bendigo; Melbourne
Melbourne Boomers	Alice Kunek; Madeleine Garrick; Elyse Penaluna; Kate Oliver; Tayla Roberts; Kristen Veal	Australia; Australia; Australia; Australia; Australia; Australia	Dandenong; Bendigo; Bendigo; Sydney; Bendigo; Canberra
Perth Lynx	Natalie Burton; Carley Mijovic; Tessa Lavey	Australia; Australia; Australia	Melbourne; Adelaide; Bendigo
SEQ Stars	Rachel Jarry; Rebecca Allen; Amy Lewis	Australia; Australia; Australia	Melbourne; Melbourne; Adelaide
Sydney Uni Flames	Alex Wilson	Australia	Townsville
Townsville Fire	Darcee Garbin; Natalie Novosel	Australia; United States	West Coast; Dandenong

=== New signings ===
New Team	Player	Nationality	Former team	Location
Adelaide Lightning	Jess Bygate; Morgan Yaeger; Taylor Ortlepp; Alex Ciabattoni; Mollie McKendrick	New Zealand; Australia; Australia; Australia; Australia	Gladstone; Forestville; Norwood; Stetson; Boston	Queensland; South Australia; South Australia; United States; United States
Bendigo Spirit	Joy Burke; Ashleigh Spencer; Molly Matthews	Taiwan; Australia; Australia	Hørsholm; Hannibal; Ballarat	Denmark; United States (Victoria (state)) Victoria
Canberra Capitals	Renee Montgomery	United States	Vologda	Russia
Dandenong Rangers	Jacinta Kennedy	Australia	Dandenong	(Victoria (state)) Victoria
Melbourne Boomers	Brittany Smart	United States	Sandringham	(Victoria (state)) Victoria
Perth Lynx	Samantha Whitcomb; Eliza Chilcott; Klara Wischer; Stacey Barr; Betnijah Laney	United States; Australia; Australia; Australia; United States	Rockingham; Hobart; Hobart; Idaho; Rutgers	Western Australia; Tasmania; Tasmania; United States; United States
SEQ Stars	Nadeen Payne; Bree Farley; Stephanie Bairstow; DeNesha Stallworth*; Ify Ibekwe; Lauren Mansfield; Emma McKenzie; Jordan Hooper	Australia; Australia; Australia; United States; United States; Australia; Australia; United States	Northside; Ipswich; Utah; Ferrol; Girona; Launceston; Gold Coast; Beşiktaş	Queensland; Queensland; United States; Spain; Spain; Tasmania; Queensland; Turkey
Sydney Uni Flames	Carolyn Swords; Joslyn Tinkle; Carly Boag	United States; United States; Australia	Umbertide; Samsun; Minot	Italy; Turkey; United States
Townsville Fire	Cherie Gallagher; Tamara Tatham; Chevannah Paalvast	Australia; Canada; New Zealand	Townsville; Piešťany; Southern Peninsula	Queensland; Slovakia (Victoria (state)) Victoria

- DeNesha Stallworth was released from the SEQ Stars mid-season and later signed by the Canberra Capitals.

=== Released signings ===
Team	Player	Nationality
Canberra Capitals	Ann Wauters; Kathleen MacLeod	Belgium; Australia
Dandenong Rangers	Elizabeth Cambage	Australia
SEQ Stars	Erin Phillips	Australia
Townsville Fire	Briana Butler	United States

== Outgoing Player Movement ==
=== Retirement ===
Former Team	Player	Nationality
Adelaide Lightning	Jessica Foley; Jennifer Screen	Australia; Australia
Bendigo Spirit	Kristi Harrower	Australia
Townsville Fire	Rachael McCully	Australia

=== Going overseas ===
Former Team	Player	Nationality	New team	Location
Adelaide Lightning	Laura Hodges	Australia	Bourges	France
Dandenong Rangers	Rachel Antoniadou; Penny Taylor; Cappie Pondexter	Australia; Australia; United States	Florida; Shanxi; Beşiktaş	United States; China; Turkey
Townsville Fire	Jillian Harmon	New Zealand	Lucca	Italy

== Coaching changes ==
Team	Incoming Coach	Nationality	Outgoing Coach	Nationality
Adelaide Lightning	Tracy York	Australia	Jeremi Moule	Australia
Bendigo Spirit	Simon Pritchard	Australia	Bernie Harrower	Australia
Dandenong Rangers	Larissa Anderson	Australia	Mark Wright	Australia
Perth Lynx	Andy Stewart	Australia	Kennedy Kereama	New Zealand
SEQ Stars	Shane Heal	Australia	inaugural season	
