= List of 2016–17 WNBL season signings =

2016–17 WNBL season
- League: WNBL
- Sport: Basketball

WNBL seasons
- ← 2015–16 2017–18 →

This is a list of all personnel changes that occurred during the 2016 Women's National Basketball League (WNBL) off-season and 2016–17 WNBL season.

== Incoming Player Movement ==
=== Re-signings ===
Team	Player	Nationality
Adelaide Lightning	Alex Ciabattoni; Jessica Good; Ieva Nagy	Australia; Australia; Australia
Bendigo Spirit	Kerryn Harrington; Heather Oliver; Ashleigh Spencer; Andrea Wilson; Molly Matthews; Ebony Rolph	Australia; Australia; Australia; Australia; Australia; Australia
Canberra Capitals	Carly Wilson	Australia
Dandenong Rangers	Sara Blicavs; Stephanie Cumming; Chloe Bibby; Aimie Clydesdale; Lauren Scherf; Amelia Todhunter; Jacinta Kennedy	Australia; Australia; Australia; Australia; Australia; Australia; Australia
Melbourne Boomers	Rebecca Cole; Brittany Smart; Olivia Thompson; Elyse Penaluna; Alice Kunek	Australia; United States; Australia; Australia; Australia
Perth Lynx	Carley Mijovic; Antonia Edmondson; Natalie Burton; Ashleigh Grant	Australia; New Zealand; Australia; Australia
Sydney Uni Flames	Hayley Moffatt; Alex Wilson; Carly Boag; Tahlia Tupaea	Australia; Australia; Australia; Australia
Townsville Fire	Darcee Garbin; Micaela Cocks; Jacqui Zelenka; Ainsley Walsh; Chevannah Paalvast	Australia; New Zealand; Australia; Australia; New Zealand

=== Internal signings ===
Team	Player	Nationality	Former team
Adelaide Lightning	Tayla Roberts	Australia	Melbourne
Bendigo Spirit	Nadeen Payne	Australia	South East Queensland
Canberra Capitals	Mikaela Ruef; Lauren Mansfield; Stephanie Bairstow; Kate Gaze	United States; Australia; Australia; Australia	Adelaide; South East Queensland; South East Queensland; Townsville
Dandenong Rangers	Natalie Novosel; Rosemary Fadljevic	United States; Australia	Townsville; Canberra
Melbourne Boomers	Tegan Cunningham; Jessica Bygate; Kelly Bowen	Australia; New Zealand; Australia	Dandenong; Adelaide; Adelaide
Perth Lynx	Tenaya Phillips	Australia	Dandenong
Sydney Uni Flames	Shanae Greaves; Belinda Snell; Leilani Mitchell	Australia; Australia; Australia	Melbourne; Bendigo; Adelaide
Townsville Fire	Kelly Wilson; Kayla Standish	Australia; United States	Bendigo; Adelaide

=== New signings ===
New Team	Player	Nationality	Former team	Location
Adelaide Lightning	Laura Hodges; Samantha Logic; Colleen Planeta; Chelsea Brook; Sarah Elsworthy; Shannon McKay; Jordan Hunter	Australia; United States; United States; Australia; Australia; Australia; New Zealand	Bourges; Calais; Hume City; Norwood; North Adelaide; North Adelaide; Sturt	France; France (Victoria (state)) Victoria; South Australia; South Australia; South Australia; South Australia
Bendigo Spirit	Nayo Raincock-Ekunwe; Blake Dietrick; Ashleigh Karaitiana	Canada; United States; Australia	Wasserburg; Princeton; Hawaii	Germany; United States; United States
Canberra Capitals	Keely Froling; Marianna Tolo; Jazmon Gwathmey	Australia; Australia; United States	Dallas; Bourges; James Madison	United States; France; United States
Dandenong Rangers	Ally Malott	United States	Adana	Turkey
Melbourne Boomers	Monique Conti; Chante Black; Rebecca Ott	Australia; United States; Australia	Melbourne; Bendigo; Knox	(Victoria (state)) Victoria (Victoria (state)) Victoria (Victoria (state)) Victoria
Perth Lynx	Ruth Hamblin; Monica Wright; Kisha Lee	Canada; United States; United States	Oregon State; Keflavík; Ansett	United States; Iceland; Northern Territory
Sydney Uni Flames	Lauren Nicholson; Jennifer Hamson; Lara McSpadden; Sarah Graham; Asia Taylor	Australia; United States; Australia; Australia; United States	Saint Mary's; Krasnoyarsk; Centre of Excellence; Hornsby; Yongin	United States; Russia; Australian Capital Territory; New South Wales; South Korea
Townsville Fire	Natasha Cloud; Haylee Andrews; Amy Kame	United States; Australia; United States	Beşiktaş; Townsville; Nunawading	Turkey; Queensland (Victoria (state)) Victoria

== Outgoing Player Movement ==
=== Retirement ===
Former Team	Player	Nationality
Canberra Capitals	Jessica Bibby; Lauren Jackson; Hanna Zavecz	Australia; Australia; Australia
Melbourne Boomers	Kristen Veal	Australia
Sydney Uni Flames	Rohanee Cox	Australia
Townsville Fire	Cherie Gallagher	Australia

=== Going overseas ===
Former Team	Player	Nationality	New Team	Location
Adelaide Lightning	Morgan Yaeger; Taylor Ortlepp	Australia; Australia	Oregon; Boston	United States; United States
Canberra Capitals	Stephanie Talbot	Australia	Gorzów Wlkp.	Poland
Dandenong Rangers	Alexandra Bunton	Australia	Moscow	Russia
Melbourne Boomers	Tess Madgen	Australia	Lublin	Poland
Perth Lynx	Louella Tomlinson	Australia	Logroño	Spain
South East Queensland Stars	Rachel Jarry; Rebecca Allen	Australia; Australia	Lattes; Košice	France; Slovakia
Sydney Uni Flames	Katie-Rae Ebzery; Maddison Penn	Australia; Australia	Moscow; Vancouver	Russia; Canada
Townsville Fire	Cayla George; Tamara Tatham	Australia; Canada	Sopron; Novosibirsk	Hungary; Russia

== Coaching changes ==
Team	Incoming Coach	Nationality	Outgoing Coach	Nationality
Adelaide Lightning	Chris Lucas	Australia	Tracy York	Australia
Canberra Capitals	Paul Goriss	Australia	Carrie Graf	Australia
Sydney Uni Flames	Cheryl Chambers	Australia	Shannon Seebohm	Australia
Townsville Fire	Claudia Brassard	Canada	Chris Lucas	Australia
