= 2016 WNBL Finals =

Team	Coach	Wins
Townsville Fire	Chris Lucas	2
Perth Lynx	Andy Stewart	0
- Dates: March 12 – 18
- MVP: Micaela Cocks Fire
- Preliminary final: Townsville defeated SEQ, 91–71

The 2016 WNBL Finals was the postseason tournament of the WNBL's 2015–16 season.

== Playoff qualifying ==
#	WNBL Championship Ladder				
#	Team	W	L	PCT	GP
1	Townsville Fire	17	7	70.83	24
2	Perth Lynx	16	8	66.67	24
3	Dandenong Rangers	15	9	62.50	24
4	South East Queensland Stars	15	9	62.50	24
5	Sydney Uni Flames	13	11	54.17	24
6	Bendigo Spirit	12	12	50.00	24
7	Adelaide Lightning	10	14	41.67	24
8	Melbourne Boomers	8	16	33.33	24
9	University of Canberra Capitals	2	22	8.33	24

== Bracket ==
Semifinals
28 February – Townsville
Townsville Fire	72
Perth Lynx	91
27 February – Dandenong
Dandenong Rangers	82
South East Queensland Stars	86

Preliminary final
5 March – Townsville
Townsville Fire	91
South East Queensland Stars	71

Grand final
12, 18 March – Perth / Townsville
Perth Lynx	0
Townsville Fire	2

== Semifinals ==
=== Major semifinal: (1) Townsville vs. (2) Perth ===
February 28, 2016
3:00 PM

SF1

Townsville Fire 72, Perth Lynx 91
Scoring by quarter: 20–26, 18–27, 17–23, 17–15
Pts: Novosel 15; Rebs: George 11; Asts: Novosel 5	Pts: Laney 23; Rebs: Mijovic 9 Asts: Lavey 4
Perth wins

Townsville RSL Stadium, Townsville, Queensland
Referees: Sean Myers, Sarah Carey, Nathan Durant

Regular-season series
Townsville won 2–1 in the regular-season series

November 28, 2015

Report

Townsville Fire 91, Perth Lynx 81

Townsville RSL Stadium, Townsville, Queensland

December 31, 2015

Report

Perth Lynx 71, Townsville Fire 77

Bendat Basketball Centre, Perth, Western Australia

February 19, 2016

Report

Perth Lynx 82, Townsville Fire 69

Bendat Basketball Centre, Perth, Western Australia

=== Elimination semifinal: (3) Dandenong vs. (4) South East Queensland ===
February 27, 2016
7:00 PM

SF2

Dandenong Rangers 82, South East Queensland Stars 86
Scoring by quarter: 22–16, 19–17, 21–22, 20–31
Pts: Blicavs 38; Rebs: Blicavs 9 Asts: Pickrel 4	Pts: Jarry 25; Rebs: Ibekwe 14; Asts: Ibekwe 5
SEQ wins

Dandenong Stadium, Dandenong, Victoria
Referees: Damian Lyons, Robyn Manhire, Jon Chapman

Regular-season series
Dandenong won 2–1 in the regular-season series

October 16, 2015

Report

Dandenong Rangers 89, South East Queensland Stars 81

Dandenong Stadium, Dandenong, Victoria

January 2, 2016

Report

South East Queensland Stars 66, Dandenong Rangers 72

Logan Metro, Logan, Queensland

February 21, 2016

Report

Dandenong Rangers 64, South East Queensland Stars 88

Dandenong Stadium, Dandenong, Victoria

== Preliminary final ==
=== (1) Townsville vs. (4) South East Queensland ===
March 6, 2016
3:00 PM

PF

Townsville Fire 91, South East Queensland Stars 71
Scoring by quarter: 31–14, 21–21, 22–21, 17–15
Pts: Batkovic 31; Rebs: George 16; Asts: Cocks 8	Pts: Hooper 20; Rebs: two tied 8 Asts: Jarry 7
Townsville wins

Townsville RSL Stadium, Townsville, Queensland
Referees: David Bull, Jason Kelly, Todd Spain

Regular-season series
SEQ won 2–1 in the regular-season series

November 20, 2015

Report

South East Queensland Stars 85, Townsville Fire 88

Logan Metro, Logan, Queensland

December 18, 2015

Report

South East Queensland Stars 95, Townsville Fire 75

Logan Metro, Logan, Queensland

January 9, 2016

Report

Townsville Fire 80, South East Queensland Stars 90

Townsville RSL Stadium, Townsville, Queensland

== Grand Final ==
=== Perth Lynx vs. Townsville Fire ===
==== Game 1 ====
March 12, 2016
7:00 PM

Game 1

Perth Lynx 57, Townsville Fire 73
Scoring by quarter: 18–18, 16–20, 16–7, 7–28
Pts: Whitcomb 20; Rebs: Laney 14; Asts: Whitcomb 4	Pts: Batkovic 25; Rebs: George 12; Asts: Cocks 5
Townsville leads series, 1–0

Bendat Basketball Centre, Perth, Western Australia
Referees: Damian Lyons, Robyn Manhire, Sarah Carey

==== Game 2 ====
March 18, 2016
7:00 PM

Game 2

Townsville Fire 80, Perth Lynx 70
Scoring by quarter: 20–17, 25–19, 12–25, 23–9
Pts: Novosel 18; Rebs: Batkovic 16; Asts: Murray 4	Pts: two tied 16; Rebs: Whitcomb 10; Asts: two tied 4
Townsville wins series, 2–0

Townsville RSL Stadium, Townsville, Queensland
Attendance: 2,200
Referees: Damian Lyons, Nathan Duranti, Sarah Carey

==== Rosters ====
2015–16 Perth Lynx roster
Players
Coaches

Pos.	No.	Nat.	Name	Ht.
C	2	(Australia)	Tomlinson, Louella	1.93 m (6 ft 4 in)
G	3	(New Zealand)	Edmondson, Antonia	1.81 m (5 ft 11 in)
G	5	(Australia)	Lavey, Tessa (C)	1.72 m (5 ft 8 in)
F	6	(Australia)	Wischer, Klara	1.81 m (5 ft 11 in)
G	7	(Australia)	Moyes, Brianna	1.66 m (5 ft 5 in)
G	9	(Australia)	Chilcott, Izzy	1.80 m (5 ft 11 in)
F/C	10	(Australia)	Burton, Natalie	1.94 m (6 ft 4 in)
F	11	(Australia)	Mijović, Carley	1.96 m (6 ft 5 in)
G	15	(Australia)	Barr, Stacey	1.73 m (5 ft 8 in)
F/C	25	(Australia)	Grant, Ashleigh	1.87 m (6 ft 2 in)
G/F	32	(United States)	Whitcomb, Sami	1.78 m (5 ft 10 in)
G/F	44	(United States)	Laney, Betnijah	1.80 m (5 ft 11 in)

Head coach

- (Australia) Andy Stewart

Assistant coach(es)

- (Australia) Ryan Petrik
- (Australia) Tom Knowles

Legend

- (C) Team captain
- (DP) Development player
- (I) Import player
- Injured

- Roster

2015–16 Townsville Fire roster
Players
Coaches

Pos.	No.	Nat.	Name	Ht.
G	6	(Australia)	Walsh, Ainsley	1.72 m (5 ft 8 in)
C	8	(Australia)	Batkovic, Suzy (C)	1.93 m (6 ft 4 in)
F	9	(Australia)	Gallagher, Cherie	1.80 m (5 ft 11 in)
G/F	10	(Australia)	Murray, Mia	1.81 m (5 ft 11 in)
G	11	(Australia)	Gaze, Kate	1.78 m (5 ft 10 in)
F	12	(Australia)	Zelenka, Jacqui	1.82 m (6 ft 0 in)
F	14	(Australia)	Garbin, Darcee	1.88 m (6 ft 2 in)
G/F	20	(New Zealand)	Paalvast, Chevannah	1.91 m (6 ft 3 in)
G	21	(United States)	Novosel, Natalie	1.80 m (5 ft 11 in)
F	22	(Australia)	George, Cayla	1.93 m (6 ft 4 in)
G	32	(New Zealand)	Cocks, Micaela	1.74 m (5 ft 9 in)

Head coach

- (Australia) Chris Lucas

Assistant coach(es)

- (Canada) Claudia Brassard
- (Australia) Mark Wrobel

Legend

- (C) Team captain
- (DP) Development player
- (I) Import player
- Injured
