= 2015–16 WNBL season =

- League: Women's National Basketball League
- Sport: Basketball
- Duration: 9 October 2015 – 18 March 2016
- Number of teams: 9

Regular season
- Top seed: Townsville Fire
- Season MVP: Suzy Batkovic Fire
- Top scorer: Suzy Batkovic Fire

Finals
- Champions: Townsville Fire
- Runners-up: Perth Lynx
- Finals MVP: Micaela Cocks Fire

WNBL seasons
- ← 2014–15 2016–17 →

The 2015–16 WNBL season is the 36th season of competition since its establishment in 1981. A total of 9 teams contested the league. The regular season was played between October 2015 and February 2016, followed by a post-season involving the top four on 28 February to 18 March 2016. The Townsville Fire were the defending champions and they would go on to repeat their run to the WNBL title, defeating the Perth Lynx 2–0 in the final.

Sponsorship included Wattle Valley, entering its third year as league naming rights sponsor. Spalding provided equipment including the official game ball, with Peak supplying team apparel. This season also saw the return of a team from South Queensland with the debut of the South East Queensland Stars.

== Team standings ==
#	WNBL Championship Ladder				
#	Team	W	L	PCT	GP
1	Townsville Fire	17	7	70.83	24
2	Perth Lynx	16	8	66.67	24
3	Dandenong Rangers	15	9	62.50	24
4	South East Queensland Stars	15	9	62.50	24
5	Sydney Uni Flames	13	11	54.17	24
6	Bendigo Spirit	12	12	50.00	24
7	Adelaide Lightning	10	14	41.67	24
8	Melbourne Boomers	8	16	33.33	24
9	University of Canberra Capitals	2	22	8.33	24

== Finals ==
Semifinals
28 February – Townsville
Townsville Fire	72
Perth Lynx	91
27 February – Dandenong
Dandenong Rangers	82
South East Queensland Stars	86

Preliminary final
5 March – Townsville
Townsville Fire	91
South East Queensland Stars	71

Grand final
12, 18 March – Perth / Townsville
Perth Lynx	0
Townsville Fire	2

== Statistics ==
=== Individual statistic leaders ===
Category	Player	Team	Statistic
Points per game	Suzy Batkovic	Townsville Fire	20.8 PPG
Rebounds per game	Cayla George	Townsville Fire	12.1 RPG
Assists per game	Kelly Wilson	Bendigo Spirit	5.5 APG
Steals per game	Sami Whitcomb	Perth Lynx	2.8 SPG
Blocks per game	Louella Tomlinson	Perth Lynx	2.0 BPG
Three point percentage	Brittany Smart	Melbourne Boomers	49.2%
Free throw percentage	Tahlia Tupaea	Sydney Uni Flames	89.7%

=== Individual game highs ===
Category	Player	Team	Statistic
Points	Sara Blicavs	Dandenong Rangers	38
Rebounds	Cayla George	Townsville Fire	18
Rebounds	Mikaela Ruef	Adelaide Lightning	18
Assists	Lauren Mansfield	South East Queensland Stars	11
Steals	Sami Whitcomb	Perth Lynx	7
Blocks	Elyse Penaluna	Melbourne Boomers	7
Blocks	Louella Tomlinson	Perth Lynx	7
Three pointers	Carley Mijovic	Perth Lynx	9

== Season award winners ==
=== Player of the Week Award ===
Round #	Player	Team
Round 1	Tess Madgen	Melbourne Boomers
Round 2	Suzy Batkovic	Townsville Fire
Round 3	Sami Whitcomb	Perth Lynx
Round 4	Rachel Jarry	South East Queensland Stars
Round 5	Gabrielle Richards	Bendigo Spirit
Round 6	Tahlia Tupaea	Sydney Uni Flames
Round 7	Suzy Batkovic (2)	Townsville Fire
Round 8	Cayla George	Townsville Fire
Round 9	Belinda Snell	Bendigo Spirit
Round 10	Brittany Smart	Melbourne Boomers
Round 11	Jordan Hooper	South East Queensland Stars
Round 12	Kelsey Griffin	Bendigo Spirit
Round 13	Gabrielle Richards (2)	Bendigo Spirit
Round 14	Lauren Mansfield	South East Queensland Stars
Round 15	Kayla Standish	Adelaide Lightning
Round 16	Natalie Novosel	Townsville Fire
Round 17	Leilani Mitchell	Adelaide Lightning
Round 18	Abby Bishop	Canberra Capitals

=== Team of the Week Award ===
Round #	Team				
Round 1	Tess Madgen Boomers	Sami Whitcomb Lynx	Kelsey Griffin Spirit	DeNesha Stallworth Stars	Elyse Penaluna Boomers
Round 2	Katie-Rae Ebzery Flames	Belinda Snell Spirit	Kelsey Griffin (2) Spirit	Suzy Batkovic Fire	Louella Tomlinson Lynx
Round 3	Tahlia Tupaea Flames	Sami Whitcomb (2) Lynx	Kelsey Griffin (3) Spirit	Sara Blicavs Rangers	Nadeen Payne Stars
Round 4	Tess Madgen (2) Boomers	Leilani Mitchell Lightning	Madeleine Garrick Boomers	Rachel Jarry Stars	Suzy Batkovic (2) Fire
Round 5	Katie-Rae Ebzery (2) Flames	Lauren Mansfield Stars	Betnijah Laney Lynx	Gabrielle Richards Spirit	Carolyn Swords Flames
Round 6	Tahlia Tupaea (2) Flames	Sami Whitcomb (3) Lynx	Ify Ibekwe Stars	Suzy Batkovic (3) Fire	Louella Tomlinson (2) Lynx
Round 7	Katie-Rae Ebzery (3) Flames	Sami Whitcomb (4) Lynx	Tamara Tatham Fire	Suzy Batkovic (4) Fire	Elyse Penaluna (2) Boomers
Round 8	Tess Madgen (3) Boomers	Sami Whitcomb (5) Lynx	Stephanie Cumming Rangers	Belinda Snell (2) Spirit	Cayla George Fire
Round 9	Tessa Lavey Lynx	Leilani Mitchell (2) Lightning	Belinda Snell (3) Spirit	Mikaela Ruef Lightning	Gabrielle Richards (2) Spirit
Round 10	Brittany Smart Boomers	Madeleine Garrick (2) Boomers	Annalise Pickrel Rangers	Jordan Hooper Stars	Suzy Batkovic (5) Fire
Round 11	Katie-Rae Ebzery (4) Flames	Lauren Mansfield (2) Stars	Sara Blicavs (2) Rangers	Jordan Hooper (2) Stars	Suzy Batkovic (6) Fire
Round 12	Leilani Mitchell (3) Lightning	Stephanie Cumming (2) Rangers	Kelsey Griffin (4) Spirit	DeNesha Stallworth (2) Capitals	Cayla George (2) Fire
Round 13	Lauren Mansfield (3) Stars	Sami Whitcomb (6) Lynx	Sara Blicavs (3) Rangers	Betnijah Laney (2) Lynx	Gabrielle Richards (3) Spirit
Round 14	Lauren Mansfield (4) Stars	Rachel Jarry (2) Stars	Kelsey Griffin (5) Spirit	Betnijah Laney (3) Lynx	Suzy Batkovic (7) Fire
Round 15	Lauren Mansfield (5) Stars	Sami Whitcomb (7) Lynx	Stephanie Cumming (3) Rangers	Kayla Standish Lightning	Cayla George (3) Fire
Round 16	Lauren Mansfield (6) Stars	Renee Montgomery Capitals	Natalie Novosel Fire	Jordan Hooper (3) Stars	Carley Mijovic Lynx
Round 17	Leilani Mitchell (4) Lightning	Carley Mijovic (2) Lynx	Ify Ibekwe (2) Stars	Abby Bishop Capitals	Suzy Batkovic (8) Fire
Round 18	Katie-Rae Ebzery (5) Flames	Sami Whitcomb (8) Lynx	Jordan Hooper (4) Stars	Abby Bishop (2) Capitals	Cayla George (4) Fire

=== Player & Coach of the Month Awards ===
For games played	Player of the Month		Coach of the Month	
For games played	Player	Team	Coach	Team
October 2015	Suzy Batkovic	Townsville Fire	Shane Heal	South East Queensland Stars
November 2015	Katie-Rae Ebzery	Sydney Uni Flames	Andy Stewart	Perth Lynx
December 2015	Suzy Batkovic (2)	Townsville Fire	Larissa Anderson	Dandenong Rangers
January 2016	Betnijah Laney	Perth Lynx	Larissa Anderson (2)	Dandenong Rangers
February 2016	Jordan Hooper	South East Queensland Stars	Chris Lucas	Townsville Fire

=== Postseason Awards ===
Award	Winner	Position	Team
Most Valuable Player Award	Suzy Batkovic	Centre	Townsville Fire
Grand Final MVP Award	Micaela Cocks	Guard	Townsville Fire
Rookie of the Year Award	Alex Ciabattoni	Forward	Adelaide Lightning
Defensive Player of the Year Award	Stephanie Cumming	Guard	Dandenong Rangers
Top Shooter Award	Suzy Batkovic	Centre	Townsville Fire
Coach of the Year Award	Andy Stewart	Coach	Perth Lynx
All-Star Five	Leilani Mitchell	Guard	Adelaide Lightning
All-Star Five	Sami Whitcomb	Guard	Perth Lynx
All-Star Five	Katie-Rae Ebzery	Guard	Sydney Uni Flames
All-Star Five	Kelsey Griffin	Forward	Bendigo Spirit
All-Star Five	Suzy Batkovic	Centre	Townsville Fire

== Team Captains & Coaches ==
Team	Captain	Coach
Adelaide Lightning	Kelly Bowen / Leilani Mitchell (co)	Tracy York
Bendigo Spirit	Kelly Wilson	Simon Pritchard
Dandenong Rangers	Aimie Clydesdale / Stephanie Cumming (co)	Larissa Anderson
Melbourne Boomers	Tess Madgen	Guy Molloy
Perth Lynx	Tessa Lavey	Andy Stewart
South East Queensland Stars	Rachel Jarry	Shane Heal
Sydney Uni Flames	Katie-Rae Ebzery	Shannon Seebohm
Townsville Fire	Suzy Batkovic	Chris Lucas
University of Canberra Capitals	Abby Bishop / Carly Wilson (co)	Carrie Graf
