= Ainsley Walsh =

Australian basketball player

No. 6 – Townsville Fire
- Position: Guard
- League: WNBL

Personal information
- Born: 28 March 1996 (age 30) Townsville, Queensland
- Listed height: 5 ft 8 in (1.73 m)

Career information
- Playing career: 2015–present

Career history
- 2015–present: Townsville Fire

Career highlights
- WNBL champion (2016)

Ainsley Walsh (born 28 March 1996) is an Australian professional basketball player who plays for the Townsville Fire in the Women's National Basketball League.

== Professional career ==
=== WNBL ===
Walsh made her professional debut with the Fire in 2015, looking to win her first title with the defending champions. Alongside the likes of Suzy Batkovic, Cayla George and Micaela Cocks, Walsh won her first championship and the Fire went back-to-back. Walsh has been re-signed for the 2016–17 season.
