= Tenaya Phillips =

Australian basketball player (born 1994)

Personal information
- Born: 20 June 1994 (age 31) Melbourne, Victoria, Australia
- Listed height: 178 cm (5 ft 10 in)

Career information
- Playing career: 2012–2021
- Position: Guard

Career history
- 2012–2015: Dandenong Rangers (SEABL)
- 2012–2013; 2014–2016: Dandenong Rangers (WNBL)
- 2016–2017: Frankston Blues
- 2016–2017: Perth Lynx
- 2018: Waverley Falcons
- 2019: Sandringham Sabres
- 2021: Dandenong Rangers (NBL1)

Career highlights
- 2× SEABL champion (2012, 2015)
Medals
Representing Australia
Basketball
FIBA Oceania Under-18 Championship
Gold medal – first place	2012 New Zealand	Team

Tenaya Edith Phillips (born 20 June 1994) is an Australian former basketball player. She played four seasons in the Women's National Basketball League (WNBL), three with the Dandenong Rangers and one with the Perth Lynx.

== Early life ==
Phillips was born in Melbourne, Victoria, in the suburb of Dandenong.

== Playing career ==
=== WNBL ===
In the 2012–13 WNBL season, Phillips played one game for the Dandenong Rangers. She returned to the Rangers in 2014–15 and played 11 games. She then played 18 games for the Rangers in 2015–16.

For the 2016–17 WNBL season, Phillips joined the Perth Lynx. She scored 24 points in her debut for the Lynx. She later missed a number of weeks with a lower leg injury.

=== State Leagues ===
Between 2012 and 2015, Phillips played for the Dandenong Rangers in the South East Australian Basketball League (SEABL).

For the 2016 SEABL season, Phillips joined the Frankston Blues. In 21 games, she averaged 12.8 points, 4.5 rebounds, 3.0 assists and 1.0 steals per game. She returned to the Blues in 2017 and averaged 15.2 points, 5.7 rebounds, 3.7 assists and 1.9 steals in 15 games.

In 2018, Phillips played for the Waverley Falcons in the Big V.

In 2019, Phillips played for the Sandringham Sabres in the inaugural NBL1 season.

In 2021, Phillips returned to the Dandenong Rangers, now in the NBL1 South.

=== National team ===
Phillips played for Australia at the 2010 Oceania Youth Tournament in New Caledonia, where the team won gold. Two years later, she won gold with Australia at the FIBA Oceania U18 Championship.

== Personal life ==
Phillips is the daughter of Jerome and Jenny Phillips. She has a twin sister, Kiara, and a younger sister, Shiloh.
