= Ieva Nagy =

Australian basketball player

Personal information
- Born: 22 January 1991 (age 35) Adelaide, South Australia, Australia
- Listed height: 5 ft 9 in (1.75 m)

Career information
- College: Hawaii Pacific (2012–2014)
- Playing career: 2015–present
- Position: Guard / Forward

Career history
- 2015–2017: Adelaide Lightning

Ieva Nagy (born 22 January 1991) is an Australian professional basketball player.

== Career ==
=== College ===
Nagy began her college career at Troy University in Troy, Alabama. After two years, she earned herself a transfer to Hawaii Pacific University in Honolulu, Hawaii for the Hawaii Pacific Sharks in NCAA Division II.

=== WNBL ===
Growing up in Adelaide, Nagy would begin her WNBL career in her home town, with the Adelaide Lightning for the 2015–16 WNBL season. Nagy has been re-signed for the 2016–17 season.
