= Jacqui Zelenka =

Australian basketball player

Personal information
- Born: 26 May 1992 (age 34) Mackay, Queensland
- Listed height: 6 ft 0 in (1.83 m)

Career information
- College: Southwest Baptist (2010–2014)
- Playing career: 2014–present
- Position: Forward

Career history
- 2014–2017: Townsville Fire

Career highlights
- 2x WNBL champion (2015, 2016); 2x All-MIAA Second Team (2013, 2014); All-MIAA Defensive Team (2013)

Jacqui Zelenka (born 26 May 1992) is an Australian professional basketball player. She previously played for the Townsville Fire in the WNBL.

== Career ==
=== College ===
From 2010–2014, Zelenka played for the Southwest Baptist Bearcats located in Bolivar, Missouri where she lived. Participating in the NCAA's Division II and primarily in the Mid-America Intercollegiate Athletics Association (MIAA).

=== WNBL ===
After a successful college career in the United States, Zelenka returned home to Queensland and began her professional career with the Townsville Fire. She has since won two WNBL Championships, led by Suzy Batkovic and Cayla George. She has been re-signed for the 2016–17 season.
