= Molly Mathews =

Australian basketball player

No. 24 – Ballarat Miners
- Position: Forward
- League: NBL1 South

Personal information
- Born: 10 February 1995 (age 31) Ballarat, Victoria
- Listed height: 187 cm (6 ft 2 in)

Career information
- Playing career: 2013–present

Career history
- 2013–2018: Ballarat Rush
- 2015–2017: Bendigo Spirit
- 2019: Melbourne Tigers
- 2021: Cockburn Cougars
- 2022–present: Ballarat Miners

Molly Mathews (born 10 February 1995) is an Australian basketball player.

== Playing career ==
Mathews debuted in the SEABL in 2013 for the Ballarat Rush. She continued with the Rush until 2018.

In 2015–16 and 2016–17, Mathews was a member of the Bendigo Spirit in the Women's National Basketball League (WNBL).

In 2019, Mathews played for the Melbourne Tigers in the NBL1. She joined the Cockburn Cougars for the 2021 NBL1 West season and then played for the Ballarat Miners in the NBL1 South in 2022 and 2023.

== Personal life ==
Mathews' partner is fellow basketball player, Nic Pozoglou.
