= Nicole How =

Malaysian-born British basketball player

Personal information
- Born: 11 October 1991 (age 35) Selangor, Malaysia
- Listed height: 5 ft 6 in (1.68 m)

Career information
- Playing career: 2014–present
- Position: Guard

Career history
- 2014–2016: Sydney Uni Flames

Nicole How (born 11 October 1991) is a Malaysian-born British professional basketball player who played for the Sydney Uni Flames in the Women's National Basketball League.

== Professional career ==
=== WNBL ===
How, growing up playing in New South Wales and in the Waratah League, made her WNBL debut with the Sydney Uni Flames in 2014 alongside the likes of Leilani Mitchell and Katie-Rae Ebzery. She was then re-signed for the 2015–16 season.

=== National team ===
How pledged her allegiance to Great Britain and made her international debut in 2014 in the EuroBasket qualifying tournament. She would then go on to represent at EuroBasket Women 2015.

== Personal life ==
How was born in Selangor, Malaysia to her British mother and Malaysian father. At age nine, she and her family moved to Sydney, Australia and How soon began basketball. Due to her ancestry, she was eligible and has chosen to, represent Great Britain internationally.
