= Maddison Penn =

Australian basketball player

Personal information
- Born: 9 May 1994 (age 32) Wahroonga, New South Wales, Australia
- Listed height: 6 ft 1 in (1.85 m)

Career information
- High school: Pymble Ladies' College (Pymble, New South Wales)
- College: British Columbia (2016–2020)
- Playing career: 2012–present
- Position: Guard

Career history
- 2012–2013: Australian Institute of Sport
- 2014–2015: Sydney Uni Flames
Medals
Representing Australia
Basketball
FIBA U-19 World Championship
Bronze medal – third place	2013 Lithuania	Team
FIBA U-18 Oceania Championship
Gold medal – first place	2012 New Zealand	Team

Maddison Rylie Penn (born 9 May 1994) is an Australian professional basketball player.

== Early life ==
Penn was born in Wahroonga, New South Wales.

== Career ==
=== College ===
Penn began her college basketball career in 2013 at Virginia Tech in Blacksburg, Virginia for the Hokies in the Atlantic Coast Conference of NCAA Division I. However, in 2014, Penn departed Virginia Tech and returned home to Australia. In 2016, she reassumed her college career at the University of British Columbia in Vancouver, British Columbia with the Thunderbirds as a sophomore.

=== WNBL ===
Penn made her WNBL debut in 2012, with the Australian Institute of Sport. After a year of college basketball, she returned and Penn was signed as a development player with the Sydney Uni Flames for the 2014–15 WNBL season.

== National team ==
=== Youth level ===
Penn made her international debut for the Gems at the 2012 FIBA Oceania Under-18 Championship in Porirua, New Zealand. She would once again represent the Gems at the Under-19 World Championship in Lithuania the following year, where they finished in third place and took home the bronze medal.
