= Stephanie Bairstow =

Australian basketball player

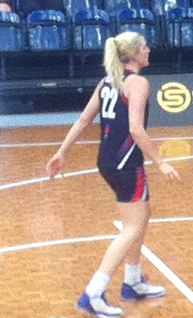

Personal information
- Born: 10 October 1994 (age 32) Sunnybank, Queensland
- Listed height: 6 ft 2 in (1.88 m)

Career information
- College: Utah State (2012–2014)
- Playing career: 2011–present
- Position: Guard / forward

Career history
- 2011–2012: Australian Institute of Sport
- 2015–2016: South East Queensland Stars
- 2016–2017: Canberra Capitals

Stephanie Sarah Bairstow (born 10 October 1994) is an Australian professional basketball player.

== Professional career ==
=== WNBL ===
Bairstow made her professional debut with the Australian Institute of Sport during the 2011–12 season. After her college career, Bairstow returned to the league with the new side in her home state, the South East Queensland Stars. Bairstow was signed by the Canberra Capitals for the 2016–17 season.

She has had Off season Stints With the Brisbane Spartans in the 2016 SEABL season and with the South West Metro Pirates in the 2017 & 2018 QBL season.

=== College ===
From 2012 to 2014, Bairstow played college basketball for the Utah State Aggies located in Logan, Utah. Bairstow left the team after seven games in her junior season.

=== Utah State statistics ===
Ratios
Year	Team	GP	FG%	3P%	FT%	RBG	APG	BPG	SPG	PPG
2012-13	Utah State	32	28.4%	17.2%	62.5%	2.47	0.38	0.56	0.63	2.16
2013-14	Utah State	31	41.9%	38.9%	66.7%	4.58	1.00	0.74	0.61	7.45
2014-15	Utah State	7	35.3%	33.3%	62.5%	2.14	1.00	0.14	1.14	6.43
Career		70	37.5%	31.6%	65.2%	3.37	0.71	0.60	0.67	4.93

Totals
Year	Team	GP	FG	FGA	3P	3PA	FT	FTA	REB	A	BK	ST	PTS
2012-13	Utah State	32	27	95	5	29	10	16	79	12	18	20	69
2013-14	Utah State	31	91	217	21	54	28	42	142	31	23	19	231
2014-15	Utah State	7	18	51	4	12	5	8	15	7	1	8	45
Career		70	136	363	30	95	43	66	236	50	42	47	345

== Personal life ==
Bairstow has two brothers who also play professional basketball: former NBA player Cameron Bairstow and current NBL player Jarred Bairstow.
