= Sami Whitcomb =

American-Australian basketball player (born 1988)

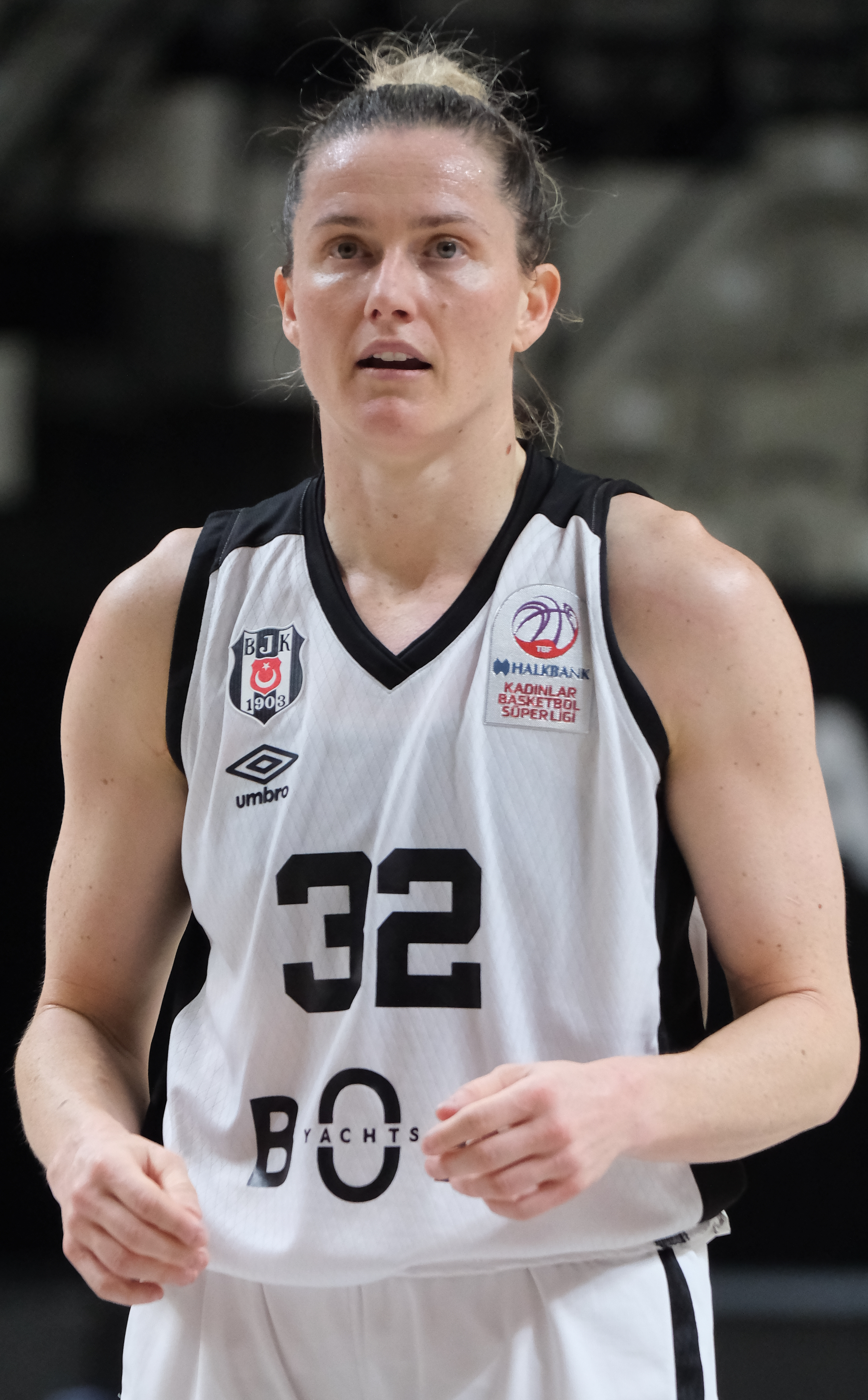
- Whitcomb with Beşiktaş JK in 2025

No. 33 – Phoenix Mercury
- Position: Shooting guard
- League: WNBA

Personal information
- Born: July 20, 1988 (age 38) Ventura, California, U.S.
- Listed height: 5 ft 10 in (1.78 m)
- Listed weight: 149 lb (68 kg)

Career information
- High school: Buena (Ventura, California)
- College: Washington (2006–2010)
- WNBA draft: 2010: undrafted
- Playing career: 2010–present

Career history
- 2011–2012: ChemCats Chemnitz
- 2012–2013: Wolfenbüttel Wildcats
- 2013–2016: Rockingham Flames
- 2013: ŠKBD Rücon
- 2015–2018: Perth Lynx
- 2017–2020: Seattle Storm
- 2018: Willetton Tigers
- 2018–2020: Basket Lattes
- 2021: Galatasaray
- 2021–2022: New York Liberty
- 2021–2023: Perth Lynx
- 2023: Willetton Tigers
- 2023–2024: Seattle Storm
- 2023–2024: Townsville Fire
- 2024: Rockingham Flames
- 2024–2025: Bendigo Spirit
- 2025: Perry Lakes Hawks
- 2025–present: Phoenix Mercury
- 2025–2026: Beşiktaş JK
- 2026: Rockingham Flames
- 2026–present: Perth Lynx

Career highlights
- 2× WNBA champion (2018, 2020); WNBL champion (2025); WNBL Grand Final MVP (2025); WNBL Most Valuable Player (2025); 5× All-WNBL First Team (2016–2018, 2023, 2025); All-WNBL Second Team (2024); 2× WNBL Leading Scorer Award (2017, 2025); 2× SBL champion (2014, 2015); 3× SBL MVP (2013–2015); 2× SBL Grand Final MVP (2014, 2015); 4× SBL All-Star Five (2013–2016); SBL All-Defensive Five (2016); 3× SBL scoring champion (2013–2015); All-Pac-10 (2010)
- Stats at Basketball Reference
Medals
Women's basketball
Representing Australia
Olympic Games
Bronze medal – third place	2024 Paris	Team
FIBA World Cup
Silver medal – second place	2018 Spain
Bronze medal – third place	2022 Australia
FIBA Asia Cup
Bronze medal – third place	2021 Jordan

Samantha Allison Whitcomb (born July 20, 1988) is an American-Australian professional basketball player for the Phoenix Mercury of the Women's National Basketball Association (WNBA). She is also contracted with the Perth Lynx of the Women's National Basketball League (WNBL). She played college basketball for the Washington Huskies before making a name for herself in Australia with the Rockingham Flames in the State Basketball League (SBL) and the Perth Lynx in the WNBL. She made her debut in the WNBA in 2017 and won championships with the Seattle Storm in 2018 and 2020. She became an Australian citizen in 2018 and made her debut for the Australian Opals. With the Bendigo Spirit in 2025, she was named WNBL Most Valuable Player and won her first WNBL championship.

== Early life ==
Born and raised in Ventura, California, Whitcomb played soccer as a child before taking up basketball at age 12. Her parents divorced when she was young, and through basketball she was able to keep a close relationship with her father despite spending less time together.

Whitcomb attended Ventura's Buena High School, where she was a four-year letterwinner and one-year team captain for the basketball team. She won numerous awards during her time at Buena, including the 2004–05 Co-County Player of the Year from the league coaches and the Ventura County Star's 2005–06 Girls' Basketball Player of the Year. She also helped her team win three Channel League titles as a sophomore, junior and senior. As a senior in 2005–06, she averaged 17.3 points, 10.5 rebounds and 3.6 steals per game.

Whitcomb was also a two-time letterwinner in track and field during her sophomore and junior years. In 2005, she placed second in the league in shot put and first in the county for seeded throwers.

== College career ==
As a freshman at Washington in 2006–07, Whitcomb appeared in 21 games and received four starting assignments. She missed eight games mid-season after suffering a broken right hand during practice. She led the team with an 81.0 free-throw shooting percentage (17-for-21), was fourth on the squad with 15 three-pointers made, and averaged 4.3 points and 1.6 rebounds per game.

As a sophomore in 2007–08, Whitcomb's role on the team increased dramatically as she appeared in all 31 games and received 30 starting assignments. Her production subsequently increased and she was rewarded for her efforts with a Pac-10 All-Defensive honorable mention team selection. She also earned Pac-10 All-Academic honorable mention honors. Her 11.2 points per game were ranked second on the team, while her 62 steals was a team high and her 74 assists were also second. On January 4, 2008, she recorded a near triple-double with nine points, nine steals and seven rebounds against Washington State. Her nine steals were two away from matching the UW school record. Six days later, she recorded her first career double-double with 17 points and 10 rebounds against UCLA. She was later named Pac-10 Player of the Week for her 24-point scoring output against California on March 2.

As a junior in 2008–09, Whitcomb appeared in all 30 games while starting 29 of them. She earned All-Pac-10 honorable mention honors and was named to the Pac-10 All-Defensive honorable mention team for a second-straight season. She also earned Pac-10 All-Academic second team honors. She led the Huskies in scoring (12.8 ppg), steals (2.3 spg), three-pointers made (54) and free-throws made (71), while she was second in rebounding (3.9 rpg) and third in assists (1.2 apg). On January 31, 2009, she scored a then career-high 29 points against Arizona State.

As a senior in 2009–10, Whitcomb started all 31 games and earned All-Pac-10 selection and Pac-10 All-Academic honorable mention honors. She averaged a career-best 13.0 points per game, set a personal high with 175 rebounds, and was named Pac-10 Player of the Week on December 28, 2009. She went on to score a career-high 32 points against Washington State on January 29, 2010.

In her four-year career at Washington, Whitcomb scored 1,205 points, a mark that ranks 15th all-time in the program's history. She graduated from Washington in the spring of 2010 with a degree in history. She began as a coaching intern while playing her final season and after a quick WNBA training camp stint, Whitcomb opted to take the open position of the Huskies' video coordinator for the 2010–11 season.

== Professional career ==
=== WNBA ===
After going undrafted in the 2010 WNBA draft, Whitcomb signed a training camp contract with the Chicago Sky on April 25, 2010. She was waived by the Sky on May 9 after appearing in three preseason games.

On February 8, 2017, Whitcomb signed with the Seattle Storm ahead of the 2017 WNBA season. In her WNBA debut on May 13, she recorded three points and three rebounds in just under seven minutes off the bench in a 78–68 loss to the Los Angeles Sparks. On May 26, she scored a career-high 22 points and hit six three-pointers in 15 minutes off the bench in an 87–81 win over the New York Liberty. Her six second-half three-pointers tied the WNBA record for most three-pointers in a half. In 34 games in 2017, she averaged 4.4 points, 1.7 rebounds and 1.0 assists in 12.2 minutes per game.

On February 1, 2018, Whitcomb re-signed with the Storm on a multi-year deal. She averaged 2.9 points and 8.5 minutes in 31 games during the regular season, before averaging 6.2 points and 12.5 minutes in six games throughout the playoffs, helping the Storm win the WNBA championship with a 3–0 sweep over the Washington Mystics in the Finals.

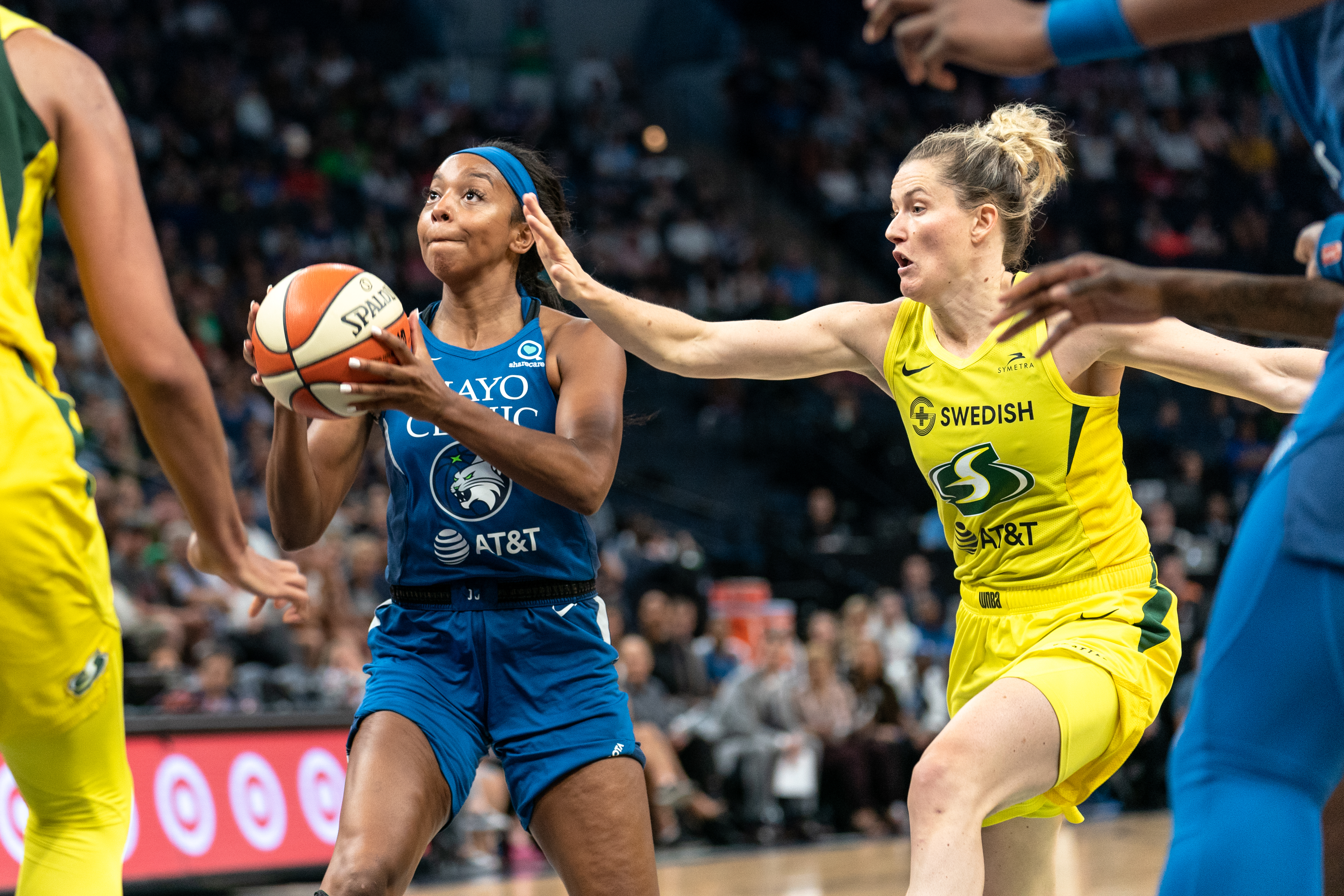
Whitcomb (right) in July 2019, defending Lexie Brown of the Minnesota Lynx

With the Storm in 2019, Whitcomb averaged 7.1 points, 1.7 rebounds, 2.2 assists and 1.1 steals in 35 games.

Due to the COVID-19 pandemic, the 2020 WNBA season was reduced to a 22-game regular season at IMG Academy, without fans present. Whitcomb appeared in all 22 games for the Storm. On August 12, 2020, she tied her career high for 3-pointers in a game with six to finish with a season-high 20 points in a 100–63 win over the Atlanta Dream. After appearing in all three games of the Storm's 3–0 semifinal series sweep over the Minnesota Lynx, she left the WNBA bubble in Bradenton, Florida, and returned to Perth, Australia, to be with her wife for the birth of their first child. The Storm went on to defeat the Las Vegas Aces 3–0 in the Finals to garner Whitcomb her second WNBA championship. For the season, Whitcomb led Seattle's reserves with a career-high 8.1 points per game alongside 2.3 rebounds, 2.0 assists and 16.5 minutes.

On February 10, 2021, Whitcomb was acquired by the New York Liberty via sign-and-trade in exchange for the rights to Stephanie Talbot. On June 26, 2021, she scored a career-high 30 points in a 101–78 win over the Atlanta Dream. She made 7 of 12 from 3-point range and tied her career high with 22 points in the first half. She appeared in 30 games during the 2021 WNBA season, including a career-high 28 starts, averaging career highs of 11.7 points, 5.0 rebounds and 2.7 assists per game. She also shot 42.5% from 3-point range.

After serving as one of the Liberty's captains in 2021, Whitcomb became the team's sole captain in 2022. On July 12, 2022, she scored 15 of her season-high 17 points in the third quarter of the Liberty's 107–101 loss to the Las Vegas Aces. She became the first Liberty player in the quarters era to make five-plus 3-pointers in a single quarter, tying the WNBA record for most threes in a third quarter in the process. Playing in a backup role, she averaged 6.5 points, 2.3 rebounds and 2.3 assists per game while shooting 35.1% from 3-point range.

On February 3, 2023, Whitcomb signed a two-year deal with the Seattle Storm, returning to the franchise for a second stint. On August 18, she had 23 points and five 3-pointers in a 78–70 loss to the Minnesota Lynx. In 40 games during the 2023 WNBA season, she averaged 9.7 points, 2.9 rebounds and 2.9 assists per game.

Whitcomb re-joined the Storm for the 2024 WNBA season. In 40 games, she averaged 5.0 points, 1.9 rebounds and 1.6 assists per game.

On February 2, 2025, Whitcomb signed with the Phoenix Mercury. On July 7, 2025, scored 29 of her career-high 36 points in the first half of the Mercury's 102–72 win over the Dallas Wings. Whitcomb appeared in 43 games (20 starts) during the 2025 WNBA season, averaging 9.1 points, 2.6 rebounds and 2.5 assists per game. She made a team-high 86 three-pointers, which tied for seventh most in the league while becoming just the second Mercury player after Diana Taurasi to reach 80 in a season. She finished the season tied with Kara Lawson for the most threes off the bench (306) in WNBA history.

On April 12, 2026, Whitcomb re-signed with the Mercury on a two-year deal worth almost $2 million. On May 6, she was ruled out for at least four to six weeks due to requiring an arthroscopy to remove a loose body in her left knee. She made her 2026 season debut on July 9.

=== Europe ===
Whitcomb considered signing in Switzerland for the 2010–11 season but the perceived lack of strong competition to prepare her to break into the WNBA ultimately led her to initially end her playing career.

In June 2011, Whitcomb launched her pro basketball career by signing with ChemCats Chemnitz of the Damen-Basketball-Bundesliga (DBBL) in Germany. In 22 games during the 2011–12 season, she averaged 11.8 points, 4.7 rebounds, 3.1 assists and 2.0 steals per game.

Whitcomb returned to Germany for the 2012–13 season, signing with the Wolfenbüttel Wildcats of the DBBL in July 2012. Wolfenbüttel made the finals in 2012–13 but went bankrupt and couldn't play out the season. In 20 games, she averaged 18.5 points, 5.5 rebounds, 2.7 assists and 2.6 steals per game.

In the fall of 2013, Whitcomb played in Slovakia for ŠKBD Rücon Spišská Nová Ves. She averaged 15.8 points, 5.9 rebounds, 2.2 assists and 2.9 steals in 15 MEL games.

Whitcomb was set to return to Germany to play for TSV 1880 Wasserburg in the 2014–15 season, but later asked for the termination of her contract citing the need for a break from playing.

For the 2018–19 season, Whitcomb played for French team Basket Lattes. In December 2018, she scored a season-high 40 points, which included 10 three-pointers. The team finished runners-up in both the French Basketball League and European Cup.

Whitcomb returned to Basket Lattes for the 2019–20 season. She scored a season-high 30 points. Due to the COVID-19 pandemic, the season was cut short.

In March 2021, Whitcomb played in Turkey for Galatasaray of the Women's Basketball Super League. She appeared in six Super League games and two EuroLeague games.

Whitcomb initially signed with French team ESB Villeneuve-d'Ascq for the 2021–22 season, but changes in family circumstance saw her return to Perth instead.

On May 31, 2025, Whitcomb signed with Beşiktaş JK of the Turkish Super League for the 2025–26 season.

=== Australia ===
==== SBL / NBL1 West ====
Whitcomb debuted in Australia in 2013 with the Rockingham Flames of the State Basketball League (SBL). She played four seasons for the Flames, winning SBL championships in 2014 and 2015 and earning grand final MVP both years. She was named SBL Most Valuable Player in 2013, 2014 and 2015, and earned SBL All-Star Five honors all four years between 2013 and 2016.

After becoming an established WNBA player, Whitcomb began having consistent short stints in the SBL / NBL1 West prior to WNBA seasons in 2018 (Willetton Tigers, 4 games); 2023 (Willetton Tigers, 2 games); 2024 (Rockingham Flames, 5 games); 2025 (Perry Lakes Hawks, 2 games); and 2026 (Rockingham Flames, 2 games).

==== WNBL ====
In May 2015, Whitcomb signed with the Perth Lynx for the 2015–16 WNBL season. She earned eight Team of the Week recognitions, was named Player of the Week for Round 3, and helped the Lynx reach their first WNBL Grand Final since 1999. In the grand final series, the Lynx were defeated 2–0 by the Townsville Fire despite Whitcomb's 20 points in game one and 15 points in game two. For the season, Whitcomb earned WNBL All-Star Five honors and finished third in league MVP voting. She appeared in all 27 games for the Lynx in 2015–16, averaging 19.4 points, 5.7 rebounds, 2.9 assists and 2.8 steals per game. She was subsequently named Lynx Club MVP.

Whitcomb re-joined the Lynx for the 2016–17 season and earned Player of the Week honors for Round 3, Player of the Month honors for October, and had 13 Team of the Week recognitions. Her 23.6 points and 2.8 steals per game were first in the WNBL for the regular season, while her 91 three-pointers set a WNBL single-season record. Her 567 total points was also the second best mark ever set in the WNBL regular season after Penny Taylor's 570 points in 2002. On March 3, 2017, Whitcomb scored 41 points in a 91–71 game two semi-final victory over the Dandenong Rangers. She made seven of her 12 three-point shots, as she notched her highest WNBL score. It was the most points scored in a semi-final in WNBL history and set a Perth Lynx individual points scoring record. The Lynx went on to lose game three of the series. She was named to the WNBL All-Star Five, finished second in league MVP voting behind Suzy Batkovic, and earned Lynx Club MVP honors for the second consecutive season. She tallied 652 points and 105 three-pointers throughout her 27 games, the highest single season points and three-pointers total in the WNBL's 36-year history. She finished the season with averages of 24.1 points, 5.2 rebounds, 3.9 assists and 2.6 steals per game, while shooting 41 per cent from beyond the arc.

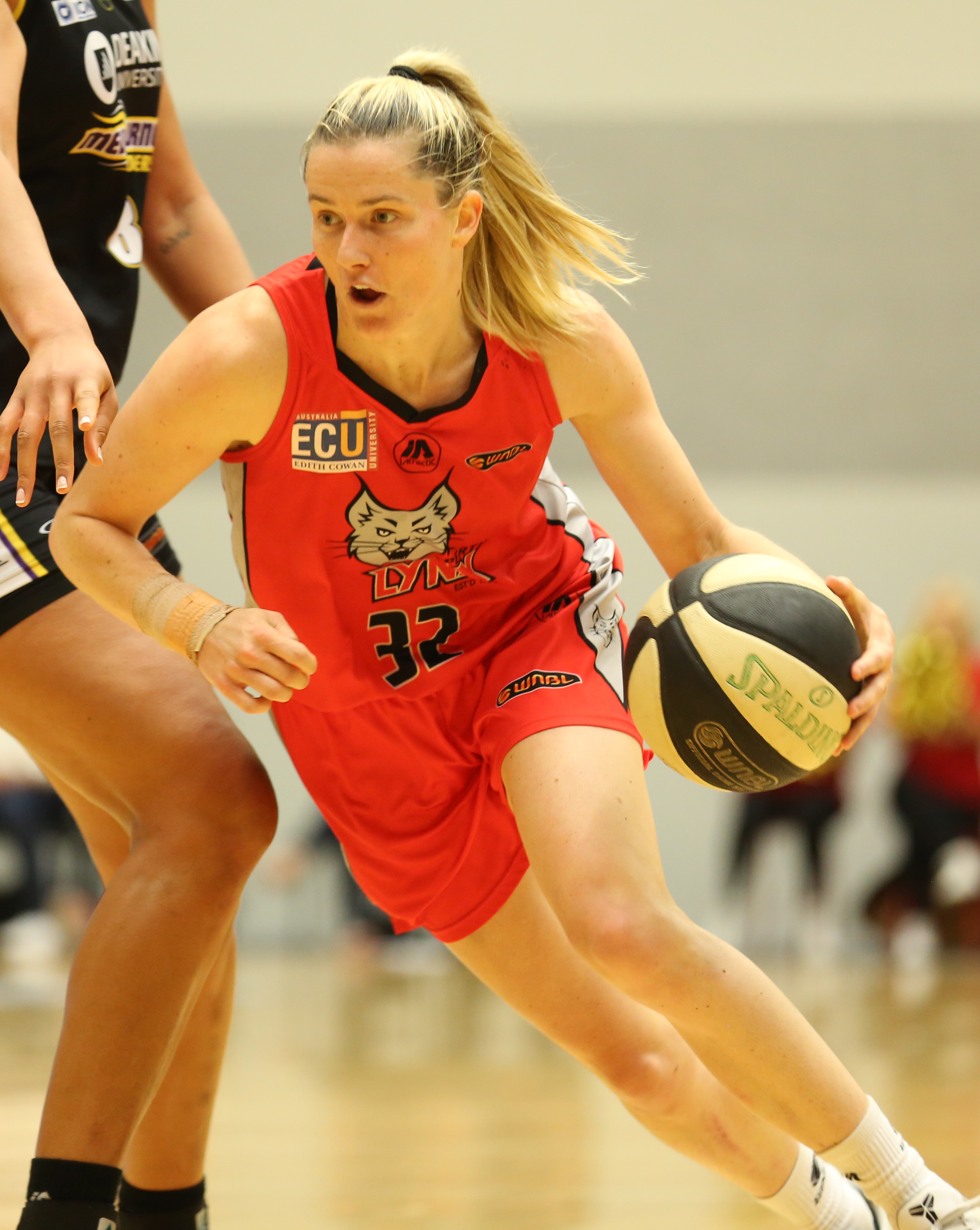
Whitcomb with the Lynx in January 2018

In April 2017, Whitcomb re-signed with the Lynx for the 2017–18 WNBL season. She was named co-captain of the team alongside Toni Farnworth. She helped the Lynx record their first 10-game win streak since 1993, with the streak finally ending after 14 straight wins culminating in claiming the minor premiership with a first-place finish and a 15–6 record. For the season, she earned one Player of the Week award, five Team of the Week selections, and All-Star Five honors for the third consecutive season. She appeared in all 23 games for the Lynx in 2017–18, averaging 17.2 points, 5.2 rebounds, 4.3 assists and 2.6 steals per game. She parted ways with the Lynx following the season.

Whitcomb parted ways with the Lynx in May 2018.

Whitcomb made a return to the Lynx in June 2020, initially signing for the 2020–21 home-and-away season. However, on November 4, 2020, she opted out of joining the Lynx for the WNBL Hub season in Queensland in order to be alongside her wife in Perth for the birth of their first child.

On December 25, 2021, Whitcomb re-signed with the Lynx for the 2021–22 WNBL season. On January 29, 2022, she scored a season-high 23 points in a 90–82 win over the Bendigo Spirit. On March 16, she tied her season high with 23 points in an 84–72 win over the Sydney Uni Flames. The Lynx finished the regular season in second place with an 11–5 record. In game one of the semi-finals against the University of Canberra Capitals, Whitcomb scored a game-high 20 points with 11 rebounds in a 91–77 win. The Lynx reached the grand final, where they lost the series 2–1 to the Melbourne Boomers despite winning game one in Melbourne. In game three, Whitcomb scored all 14 of her points in the first half. For the season, she averaged 14 points, 5.3 rebounds and 3.6 assists per game.

On June 11, 2022, Whitcomb re-signed with the Lynx for the 2022–23 WNBL season. In the season opener on November 2, she scored 30 points in a 104–88 loss to the Melbourne Boomers. On January 13, 2023, she scored 33 points in a 94–86 win over the Southside Flyers. The Lynx reached the semi-finals where they lost 2–0 to the Townsville Fire despite Whitcomb's game-high 26 points in game two. She was named in the All-WNBL First Team. In 21 games, she averaged 18.3 points, 4.3 rebounds and 4.8 assists per game.

On June 27, 2023, Whitcomb signed with the Townsville Fire for the 2023–24 WNBL season. On December 29, 2023, she scored a season-high 26 points while playing all 45 minutes of the Fire's overtime loss to the Sydney Flames. Two days later, she had another 26-point effort with six 3-pointers and five assists in an 87–64 win over the Lynx. She was named to the All-WNBL Second Team.

On September 14, 2024, Whitcomb signed with the Bendigo Spirit for the 2024–25 WNBL season. She averaged 26.7 points over the first four games, helping the Spirit start the season 4–0. On December 5, she recorded the first triple-double of her WNBL career with 16 points, 13 rebounds and 10 assists in a 72–66 win over the Perth Lynx, helping the Spirit remain undefeated to start the season. On December 14, she scored 35 points in an 86–80 win over the Townsville Fire to extend the winning streak to nine in a row. She helped the Spirit finish the regular season in first place with an 18–3 record, leading the league in scoring (440 points) and averaged 21 points, 6.3 rebounds and 5 assists per game. She was subsequently named WNBL Most Valuable Player and All-WNBL First Team. She helped the Spirit reach the WNBL Grand Final with 22 points, 10 rebounds and six assists in a game two victory over the Sydney Flames in the semi-finals. In game one of the grand final series against the Fire, Whitcomb had 12 points, eight rebounds and three assists in a 70–60 win. In game two, she scored 26 points in a 63–55 victory, helping the Spirit win the WNBL championship. She was subsequently named the grand final MVP. She parted ways with the Spirit following the season after receiving an offer to play in Europe.

On May 14, 2026, Whitcomb signed a two-year deal with the Perth Lynx, returning to the team for a third stint. On August 27, 2026, she was ruled out for the entire 2026–27 WNBL season with a knee injury.

== National team career ==
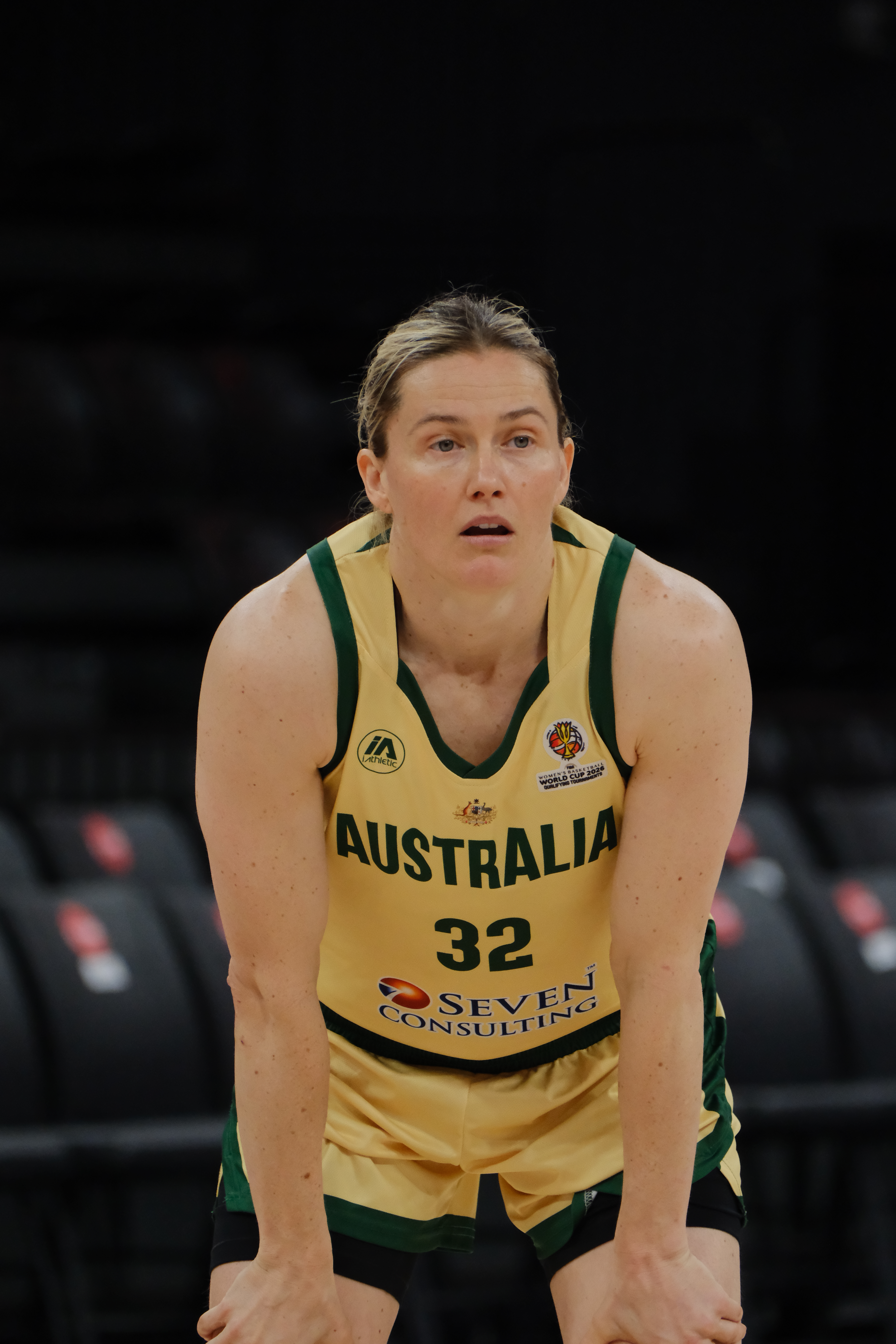
Whitcomb with the Opals in March 2026

In May 2017, Whitcomb applied for Australian citizenship. She qualified after meeting the criteria of living in Australia for at least four years and being a permanent resident for at least 12 months. But the process had stalled by June because of the challenges associated with applying from overseas. In December 2017, she was added to the Australian Opals squad ahead of the 2018 Commonwealth Games, with her Australian citizenship application approval imminent. On February 1, 2018, Whitcomb was naturalized at a ceremony in Perth before flying to Italy the next day for the Opals' training camp. She ultimately missed out on making the final squad.

In September 2018, Whitcomb debuted with the Opals at the FIBA World Cup after she replaced the injured Leilani Mitchell. She won a World Cup silver medal. In June 2019, she was selected to the Opals' Asia Cup training squad.

In September and October 2021, Whitcomb captained the Opals at the FIBA Asia Cup. She helped the Opals reach the bronze medal match, where they defeated South Korea 88–58 behind Whitcomb's 15 points, nine rebounds and eight assists.

In February 2022, Whitcomb captained the Opals at the FIBA World Cup Qualifying Tournament in Serbia. She was named in the All-Star Five for the tournament.

In July 2024, Whitcomb was named in the Opals' final squad for the Paris Olympics. She earned a bronze medal in the competition.

In March 2026, Whitcomb played for the Opals at the 2026 FIBA Women's Basketball World Cup Qualifying Tournament in Turkey, earning tournament MVP and All-Star Five honors. She was named in the final squad for the 2026 FIBA Women's Basketball World Cup, but later withdrew due to a knee injury.

== Career statistics ==
Legend
GP	Games played	GS	Games started	MPG	Minutes per game	RPG	Rebounds per game
APG	Assists per game	SPG	Steals per game	BPG	Blocks per game	PPG	Points per game
TO	Turnovers per game	FG%	Field-goal percentage	3P%	3-point field-goal percentage	FT%	Free-throw percentage
**Bold**	Career best	°	League leader

†	Denotes seasons in which Whitcomb won a WNBA championship

=== WNBA ===
==== Regular season ====
Stats current as of end of 2025 season

WNBA regular season statistics
Year	Team	GP	GS	MPG	FG%	3P%	FT%	RPG	APG	SPG	BPG	TO	PPG
2017	Seattle	33	0	12.2	.361	.333	.810	1.7	1.0	0.7	0.0	0.9	4.5
2018^{†}	Seattle	31	0	8.5	.349	.362	**1.000**	0.9	0.5	0.5	0.1	**0.5**	2.9
2019	Seattle	33	13	20.4	.366	.342	**1.000**	1.7	2.4	**1.1**	0.1	1.6	7.2
2020^{†}	Seattle	22	0	16.5	.443	.381	**1.000**	2.3	2.0	0.7	0.1	1.0	8.1
2021	New York	30	**28**	**28.1**	**.473**	**.425**	.818	**5.0**	2.7	1.0	0.3	2.1	**11.7**
2022	New York	35	6	21.3	.366	.351	.870	2.4	2.3	0.7	0.1	1.4	6.5
2023	Seattle	40	19	24.5	.400	.385	.830	2.9	**2.9**	0.9	**0.4**	2.0	9.7
2024	Seattle	40	3	15.3	.346	.292	.818	1.9	1.6	0.8	0.2	1.0	5.0
2025	Phoenix	**43**	20	23.9	.385	.361	.852	2.6	2.5	0.8	0.2	1.6	9.1
**Career**	9 years, 3 teams	307	89	19.3	.393	.361	.863	2.4	2.0	0.8	0.2	1.4	7.2

==== Playoffs ====
WNBA playoff statistics
Year	Team	GP	GS	MPG	FG%	3P%	FT%	RPG	APG	SPG	BPG	TO	PPG
2017	Seattle	1	0	11.0	.143	.167	—	2.0	1.0	**1.0**	0.0	**0.0**	3.0
2018^{†}	Seattle	6	0	12.5	**.464**	**.500**	**.750**	1.2	1.2	0.7	**0.2**	0.5	**6.2**
2019	Seattle	2	0	12.5	.375	**.500**	—	0.5	0.0	0.5	0.0	0.5	4.5
2020^{†}	Seattle	3	0	10.7	.333	.273	—	1.3	1.7	**1.0**	0.0	0.3	5.0
2021	New York	1	**1**	**34.0**	.250	.333	—	**5.0**	**3.0**	0.0	0.0	**0.0**	3.0
2022	New York	3	0	14.7	.364	.429	—	0.3	2.0	**1.0**	0.0	**0.0**	3.7
2024	Seattle	1	0	2.0	.000	—	—	0.0	0.0	0.0	0.0	1.0	0.0
2025	Phoenix	**11**	0	23.0	.288	.241	.667	1.9	2.5	1.2	**0.2**	1.1	5.9
**Career**	8 years, 3 teams	28	1	17.0	.325	.311	.692	1.5	1.8	0.9	0.1	0.6	5.1

=== College ===
NCAA statistics
Year	Team	GP	GS	MPG	FG%	3P%	FT%	RPG	APG	SPG	BPG	TO	PPG
2006–07	Washington	21	4	13.7	.377	.278	.810	1.6	0.8	0.8	0.0	**0.8**	4.3
2007–08	Washington	31	30	27.9	.375	.335	.676	4.1	2.4	2.0	0.1	2.5	11.2
2008–09	Washington	30	29	29.7	.368	.329	.772	3.9	1.2	**2.3**	**0.3**	2.8	12.8
2009–10	Washington	**31**	**31**	**31.7**	**.397**	**.359**	**.858**	**5.6**	**2.5**	1.5	0.2	2.8	**13.0**
**Career**		113	94	26.8	.380	.333	.786	4.0	1.8	1.7	0.2	2.3	10.6

== Personal life ==
Whitcomb is the daughter of Jan and Sander, and has an older brother, Jason. Her great uncle, Roy Schmidt, played in the NFL with the Falcons, Packers and Redskins in the 1960s and 1970s.

Whitcomb is married to former Willetton Tigers SBL player, Kate Malpass. Malpass is a physiotherapist and physical education teacher. The couple married in the U.S. in 2017 and then had their marriage recognised in Australia when same-sex marriage laws changed. They had their first child in November 2020. The couple have two children as of May 2026.
