= Ify Ibekwe =

Nigerian basketball player (born 1989)

Personal information
- Born: 5 October 1989 (age 37) Los Angeles, California, U.S.
- Listed height: 1.88 m (6 ft 2 in)
- Listed weight: 67 kg (148 lb)

Career information
- High school: Narbonne (Los Angeles, California)
- College: Arizona (2007–2011)
- WNBA draft: 2011: 2nd round, 24th overall
- Drafted by: Seattle Storm
- Playing career: 2011–present
- Position: Small forward / power forward

Career history
- 2011: Seattle Storm
- 2012: CB Ciudad de Burgos
- 2013: Ibaizabal Galdakao
- 2014–2019: Spar Citylift Girona
- 2015–2016: South East Queensland Stars
- 2017: Los Angeles Sparks
- 2019–: Virtus Eirene Ragusa

Career highlights
- Pac-12 Defensive Player of the Year (2011); 3× Pac-12 All-Defensive Team (2009–2011); 3× All Pac-12 (2009–2011); Pac-12 All-Freshman Team (2008)
- Stats at WNBA.com
- Stats at Basketball Reference

Ifunanya Debbie "Ify" Ibekwe (born 5 October 1989) is a Nigerian-American professional basketball player for the Virtus Eirene Ragusa and the Nigeria women's national team.

== Professional career ==
Ibekwe was selected in the second round of the 2011 WNBA draft (24th overall) by the Seattle Storm.

== National team career ==
Ify represents the Nigerian Women's National Team.

== Career statistics ==
Legend
GP	Games played	GS	Games started	MPG	Minutes per game	RPG	Rebounds per game
APG	Assists per game	SPG	Steals per game	BPG	Blocks per game	PPG	Points per game
TO	Turnovers per game	FG%	Field-goal percentage	3P%	3-point field-goal percentage	FT%	Free-throw percentage
**Bold**	Career best	°	League leader

=== WNBA ===
==== Regular season ====
WNBA regular season statistics
Year	Team	GP	GS	MPG	FG%	3P%	FT%	RPG	APG	SPG	BPG	TO	PPG
2011	Seattle	3	0	2.7	0.0	—	—	**1.0**	0.0	0.0	0.0	0.3	0.0
2012	Did not play (waived)												
2013	Did not appear in league												
2014	Did not appear in league												
2015	Did not appear in league												
2016	Did not appear in league												
2017	Los Angeles	**6**	0	**3.8**	**11.1**	0.0	**66.7**	0.8	0.0	**0.2**	0.0	0.3	**1.0**
**Career**	2 years, 2 teams	9	0	3.4	9.1	0.0	66.7	0.9	0.0	0.1	0.0	0.3	0.7

=== College ===
NCAA statistics
Year	Team	GP	Points	FG%	3P%	FT%	RPG	APG	SPG	BPG	PPG
2007–08	Arizona	24	249	47.3	–	53.2	8.0	0.6	1.1	1.3	10.4
2008–09	Arizona	29	456	45.9	25.0	66.1	**11.6**	1.1	2.1	**1.8**	15.7
2009–10	Arizona	31	434	47.2	35.3	61.8	11.4	**2.2**	2.2	1.2	14.0
2010–11	Arizona	**32**	**514**	**47.8**	**42.4**	**70.2**	9.8	1.9	**2.3**	1.5	**16.1**
**Career**		116	1653	47.0	38.9	64.4	10.3	1.5	2.0	1.4	14.3

== Personal life ==
Ibekwe is the daughter of Nigerian parents, Agatha and Augustine Ibekwe. She has two brothers who also played college basketball: Onye played for Long Beach State and Ekene played for the University of Maryland. She also has one sister, Chinyere.
