= Jordan Hooper =

American basketball player (born 1992)

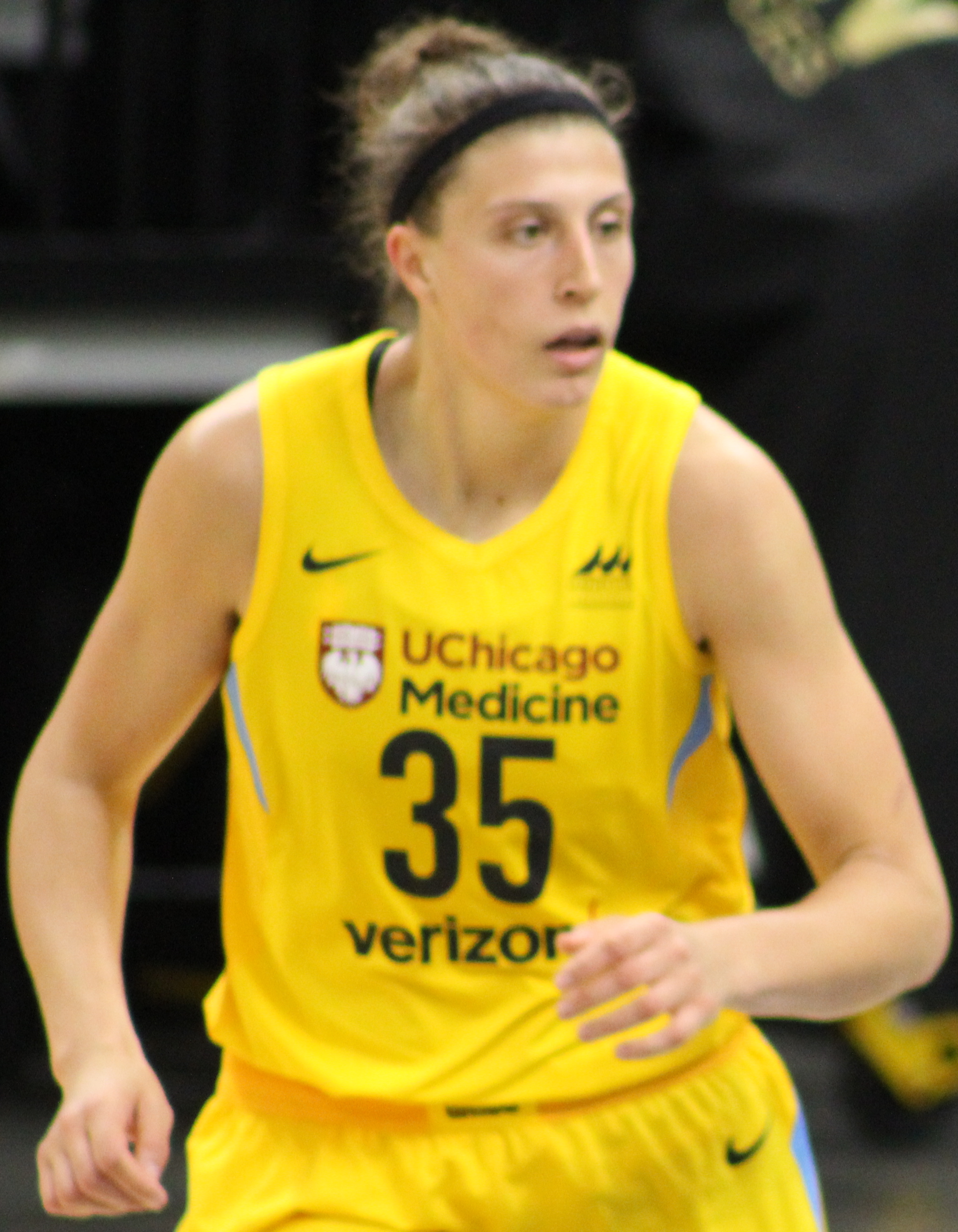
- Hooper in 2018

Free agent
- Position: Small forward

Personal information
- Born: February 20, 1992 (age 34) Alliance, Nebraska, U.S.
- Listed height: 6 ft 2 in (1.88 m)
- Listed weight: 185 lb (84 kg)

Career information
- High school: Alliance (Alliance, Nebraska)
- College: Nebraska (2010–2014)
- WNBA draft: 2014: 2nd round, 13th overall pick
- Drafted by: Tulsa Shock
- Playing career: 2014–present

Career history
- 2014–2016: Tulsa Shock / Dallas Wings
- 2014–2015: Beşiktas
- 2015–2016: South East Queensland Stars
- 2017: Connecticut Sun
- 2017: Atlanta Dream
- 2017: Chicago Sky

Career highlights
- WBCA All-American (2014); Second-team All-American – AP (2014); Big Ten co-Player of the Year – Coaches (2014); 3× First-team All-Big Ten (2012–2014); Big 12 All-Freshman Team (2011)
- Stats at WNBA.com
- Stats at Basketball Reference
Medals
Women's basketball
Representing United States
World University Games
Gold medal – first place	2013 Kazan	Team

Jordan Renee Hooper (born February 20, 1992) is an American basketball player. She last played for the Atlanta Dream of the Women's National Basketball Association (WNBA). She was an All-American forward at the college level for the University of Nebraska–Lincoln.

== High school ==
Hooper grew up on a ranch outside Alliance, Nebraska. As a high school player, she was twice the Gatorade Player of the Year for Nebraska and led Alliance High School to a state title as a freshman in 2007. In addition to her basketball career, she was also an All-State volleyball player and competed in the long jump for the school's track team.

== College career ==
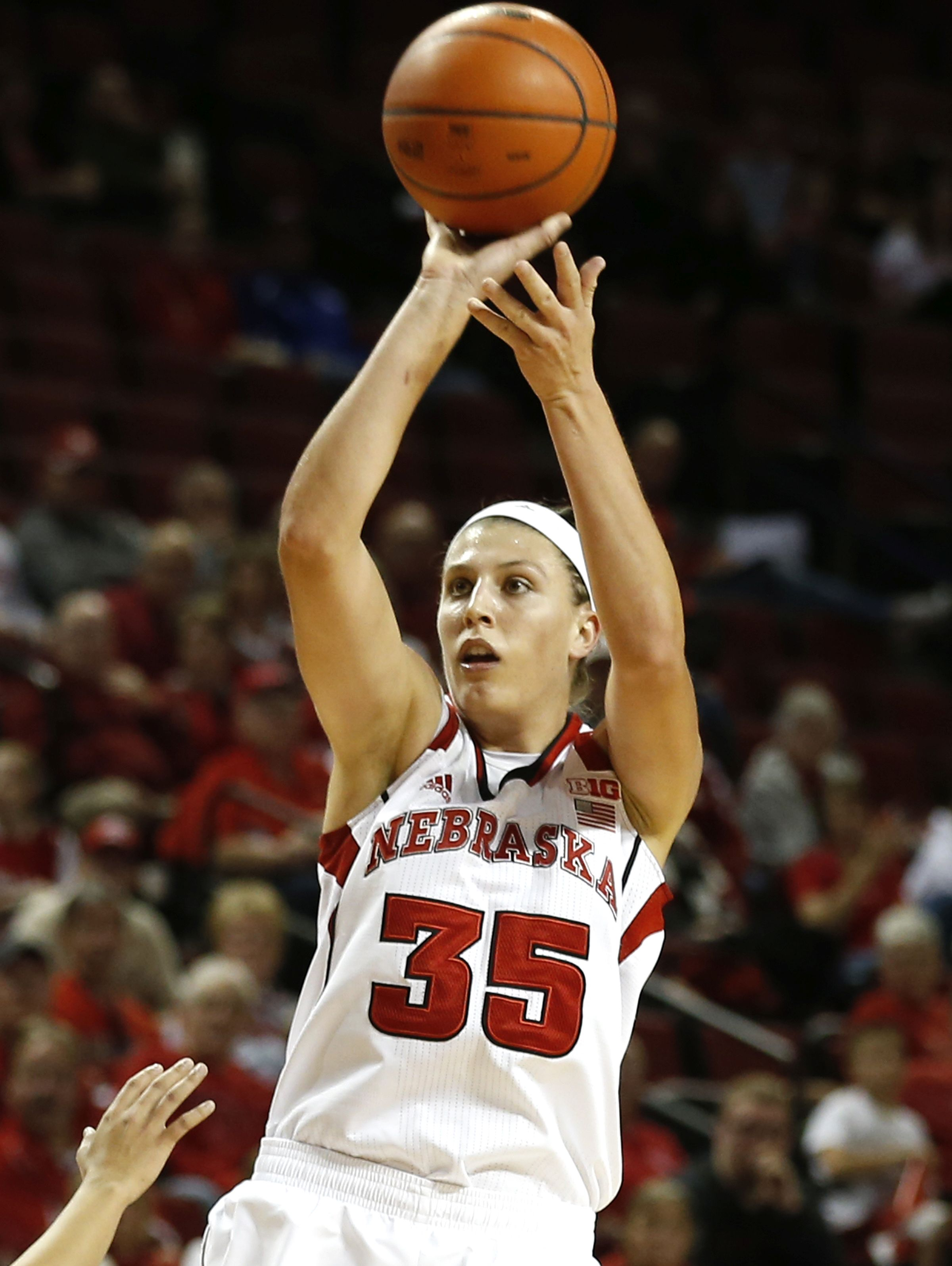
Hooper playing for the Nebraska Cornhuskers

At Nebraska, Hooper played four years under coach Connie Yori and left the program as one of its all-time greats. A four-year starter, she led the Cornhuskers to NCAA Tournament berths in each of her last three years (2012, 2013, 2014) – including a trip to the tournament Sweet Sixteen as a junior. She was named first team All-Big Ten Conference in each of these seasons and capped her career off by being named Big Ten Player of the Year by the league's coaches in 2014. For her career, she scored 2,357 points (18.0 per game) and collected 1,100 rebounds (8.5 per game). She became the third player in school history to pass the 2,000 point/1,000 rebound milestone.

In addition to earning conference player of the year honors, Hooper was named a first team All-American by the Women's Basketball Coaches Association (WBCA) and a second team All-American by the Associated Press. She was a finalist for the Wade Trophy and Wooden Award National Player of the Year honors, as well for the Senior CLASS Award for top senior.

== Career statistics ==
Legend
GP	Games played	GS	Games started	MPG	Minutes per game	RPG	Rebounds per game
APG	Assists per game	SPG	Steals per game	BPG	Blocks per game	PPG	Points per game
TO	Turnovers per game	FG%	Field-goal percentage	3P%	3-point field-goal percentage	FT%	Free-throw percentage
**Bold**	Career best	°	League leader

=== WNBA ===
==== Regular season ====
Year	Team	GP	GS	MPG	FG%	3P%	FT%	RPG	APG	SPG	BPG	TO	PPG
2014	Tulsa	**34**	1	**19.0**	35.4	32.9	71.4	**2.4**	**0.6**	0.4	**0.2**	0.8	5.8
2015	Tulsa	**34**	**5**	17.1	35.8	34.2	68.4	2.1	0.3	0.4	0.1	0.5	4.7
2016	Dallas	32	1	9.1	37.5	34.1	**87.5**	1.2	0.2	0.2	0.1	0.5	3.7
2017	Connecticut	3	0	3.7	0.0	0.0	0.0	0.3	0.0	0.0	0.0	**0.0**	0.0
2017	Atlanta	15	0	6.8	**40.0**	**42.9**	75.0	0.9	0.2	0.3	0.0	0.3	3.1
2017	Chicago	10	0	18.6	36.8	37.0	50.0	2.2	**0.6**	**0.5**	0.1	0.5	**6.0**
Career	4 years, 3 teams	128	7	14.2	36.3	34.6	72.2	1.8	0.3	0.3	0.1	0.6	4.5

==== Playoffs ====
Year	Team	GP	GS	MPG	FG%	3P%	FT%	RPG	APG	SPG	BPG	TO	PPG
2015	Tulsa	2	2	26.0	21.1	18.8	71.4	4.5	0.0	0.0	0.0	0.0	8.0
Career	1 year, 1 team	2	2	26.0	21.1	18.8	71.4	4.5	0.0	0.0	0.0	0.0	8.0

=== College ===
Legend
GP	Games played	GS	Games started	MPG	Minutes per game
FG%	Field goal percentage	3P%	3-point field goal percentage	FT%	Free throw percentage
RPG	Rebounds per game	APG	Assists per game	SPG	Steals per game
BPG	Blocks per game	PPG	Points per game	**Bold**	Career high

Year	Team	GP	Points	FG%	3P%	FT%	RPG	APG	SPG	BPG	PPG
2010-11	Nebraska	31	454	36.2	**36.4**	73.3	6.6	0.3	0.8	0.5	14.6
2011-12	Nebraska	33	624	39.7	31.9	78.1	**9.3**	0.5	0.9	**0.7**	18.9
2012-13	Nebraska	**34**	607	40.0	33.5	**82.1**	8.8	0.6	**1.1**	0.5	17.9
2013-14	Nebraska	33	**672**	**43.7**	**36.4**	80.3	9.1	**1.2**	1.0	0.5	**20.4**
Career	Nebraska	131	2357	40.1	34.5	78.8	8.5	0.7	0.9	0.6	18.0

== Professional career ==
Following her graduation from Nebraska, Hooper was drafted by the WNBA's Tulsa Shock with the first pick of the second round (13th overall) of the 2014 WNBA draft. She was named to the team's final roster for the 2014 WNBA season.

== International career ==
Following her junior season at Nebraska, Hooper was a part of the United States team in the 2013 Summer Universiade in Kazan, Russia. Hooper earned her first start in the championship game and delivered. She helped the team get out to an early lead, and ended up with nine points and nine rebounds. She averaged 6.5 points and 5.8 rebounds per game as the team won the gold medal in the tournament.
