= Lauren Mansfield =

Australian basketball player

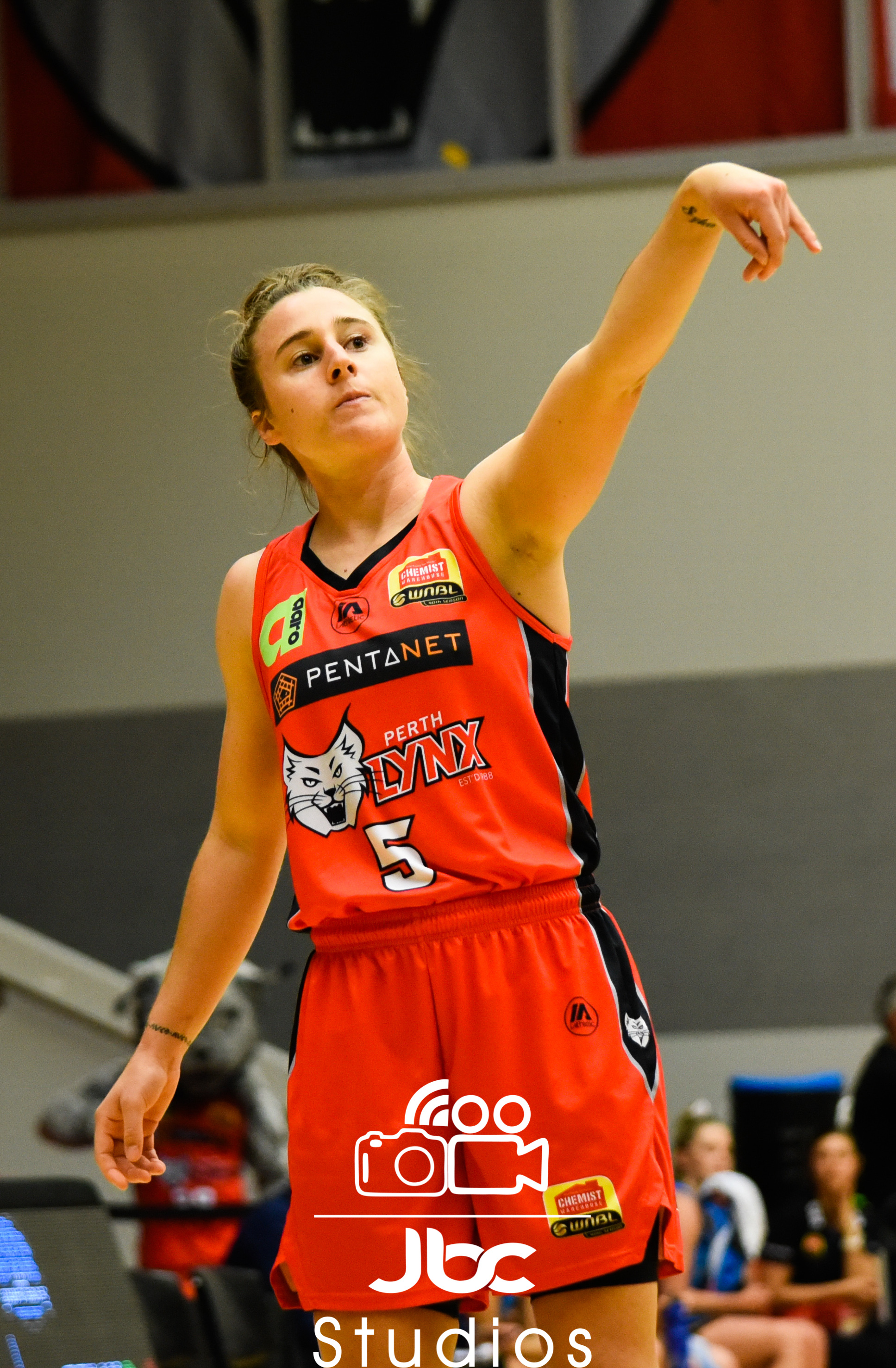
- Mansfield with the Perth Lynx in 2019

Personal information
- Born: 18 December 1989 (age 36) Adelaide, South Australia, Australia
- Listed height: 170 cm (5 ft 7 in)

Career information
- College: Midland (2008–2010); Iowa State (2010–2012)
- WNBA draft: 2012: undrafted
- Playing career: 2012–present
- Position: Guard

Career history
- 2012–2014: Adelaide Lightning
- 2015–2016: South East Queensland Stars
- 2016–2017: Canberra Capitals
- 2018–2020: Perth Lynx
Medals
Representing Australia
Women's basketball
FIBA Asia Cup
Silver medal – second place	2017 India
World University Games
Bronze medal – third place	2009 Belgrade	Team
Bronze medal – third place	2013 Kazan	Team
Women's 3x3 basketball
FIBA 3x3 World Cup
Bronze medal – third place	2023 Vienna	Team
Commonwealth Games
Bronze medal – third place	2022 Birmingham	Team

Lauren Mansfield (born 18 December 1989) is an Australian professional basketball player.

== Career ==
=== College ===
Lauren played college basketball for two years at Midland College in Texas before strong showings earned her a transfer to Iowa State University to play for the Iowa State Cyclones in the Big 12 Conference where she was starting point guard.

=== Australia ===
After returning from college, Mansfield signed on with her home team the Adelaide Lightning. She has also played in the South East Australian Basketball League for the Launceston Tornadoes since the 2013 season. After not playing the 2014–2015 season, Mansfield signed on for the South East Queensland Stars inaugural season making her return to the WNBL. Mansfield played a larger role than originally anticipated due to the untimely injury of Erin Phillips. She made the most of opportunity, finishing in the league's top 10 scorers with 15.5 points per game, and 2nd in the league for assists with 5.4 per game. Her excellent season was recognised by finishing in 8th place for WNBL MVP voting, and being named in the Australian Opals squad for the 2016 Summer Olympics. In May 2016 she was signed by the Canberra Capitals.

On 13 March 2018, Mansfield signed a two-year deal with the Perth Lynx.

== National team ==
Mansfield was named in the Australian 3x3 team for the 2024 Paris Olympics.
