= Hayley Moffatt =

Australian basketball player

No. 3 – Sydney Uni Flames
- Position: Guard
- League: WNBL

Personal information
- Born: 10 August 1985 (age 41) Mossman, Queensland
- Listed height: 5 ft 9 in (1.75 m)

Career information
- Playing career: 2012–present

Career history
- 2012–2013: West Coast Waves
- 2013–2014: Logan Thunder
- 2014–present: Sydney Uni Flames

Career highlights
- WNBL champion (2017)

Hayley Moffatt (born 10 August 1985) is an Australian basketball player, who currently plays for the Sydney Uni Flames in the WNBL.

== Career ==
=== WNBL ===
Moffatt began her WNBL career with the West Coast Waves in 2012. For the following season, she returned home to Queensland and signed with the Logan Thunder. After the team left the league, Moffatt was joined the Sydney Uni Flames. Moffatt has re-signed with the Flames for the 2016–17 season, her third consecutive season in Sydney.
