= DeNesha Stallworth =

American basketball player (born 1992)

Houston Cougars
- Title: Assistant coach
- League: Big 12 Conference

Personal information
- Born: May 5, 1992 (age 34) San Francisco, California, U.S.
- Listed height: 6 ft 3 in (1.91 m)

Career information
- High school: Pinole Valley (Pinole, California)
- College: California (2009–2011); Kentucky (2012–2014)
- WNBA draft: 2014: 3rd round, 25th overall pick
- Drafted by: Connecticut Sun
- Position: Forward

Career history

Coaching
- 2023–2024: UC Santa Barbara (assistant)
- 2024–2025: Boston College (assistant)
- 2025–present: Houston (assistant)

Career highlights
- First-team All-SEC (2013); All Pac-10 (2011); Pac-10 All-Freshman Team (2010); McDonald's All-American (2009)
- Stats at Basketball Reference

DeNesha Rachell Stallworth (born May 5, 1992) is a professional basketball player who briefly played in the WNBA. She is currently an assistant coach of the Houston Cougars women's basketball team.

== College ==
Stallworth spent two years at University of Kentucky and two years at University of California, Berkeley.

== College statistics ==
Legend
GP	Games played	GS	Games started	MPG	Minutes per game
FG%	Field goal percentage	3P%	3-point field goal percentage	FT%	Free throw percentage
RPG	Rebounds per game	APG	Assists per game	SPG	Steals per game
BPG	Blocks per game	PPG	Points per game	**Bold**	Career high

Year	Team	GP	Points	FG%	3P%	FT%	RPG	APG	SPG	BPG	PPG
2009–10	California	**37**	**476**	50.5	39.1	71.7	6.4	0.9	1.0	1.1	12.9
2010–11	California	34	452	47.3	23.8	61.0	6.4	1.1	1.2	1.0	**13.3**
2011–12	Transfer										
2012–13	Kentucky	35	438	48.4	29.4	**80.5**	6.0	**1.9**	1.2	**1.5**	12.5
2013–14	Kentucky	30	374	**52.4**	**54.5**	64.7	**6.9**	1.0	**1.5**	1.2	12.5
Career		136	1740	49.4	33.7	69.1	6.4	1.2	1.2	1.2	12.8

== Personal life ==
Stallworth's parents both played college basketball. She graduated from University of Kentucky with degrees in family sciences and African-American studies.
