= Cherie Gallagher =

Australian basketball player

Townsville Fire
- Position: Forward
- League: WNBL

Personal information
- Born: 8 January 1983 (age 43) Mildura, Victoria
- Listed height: 5 ft 11 in (1.80 m)

Career information
- Playing career: 2002–2016

Career history
- 2002–2007: Adelaide Lightning
- 2007–2010: Townsville Fire
- 2012–2013: Townsville Fire
- 2015–2016: Townsville Fire

Career highlights
- WNBL champion (2016)

Cherie Gallagher (née Smith; born 8 January 1982) is an Australian professional basketball player, who was a championship winning player for the Townsville Fire in the WNBL. She also previously played for the Adelaide Lightning.

== Career ==
=== WNBL ===
Raised in Mildura and playing for Mildura Mavericks junior team, Gallagher found herself in South Australia with the Forestville Eagles. This led to her WNBL debut with the Adelaide Lightning. She then had a three season stint with the Townsville Fire in North Queensland. From 2010 to 2016, Gallagher would play two seasons for the Fire, whilst she was a wife and mother of two. On both occasions she helped them reach the Grand Final. After falling short to the Bendigo Spirit in 2013. She would return to the roster two years later and fulfil what she fell short of those years prior, and was crowned a WNBL champion.
