= Micaela Cocks =

New Zealand basketball player

No. 32 – Townsville Fire
- Position: Guard
- League: WNBL

Personal information
- Born: 2 May 1986 (age 40) Takapuna, New Zealand
- Listed height: 5 ft 9 in (1.75 m)

Career information
- College: Oregon (2006–2010)
- Playing career: 2005–present

Career history
- 2005: North Harbour Breeze
- 2006: Auckland Lady Hawks
- 2010: Energa Torun (Poland)
- 2010: Cote d'Opale Basket (France)
- 2011–present: Townsville Fire

Career highlights
- 3× WNBL champion (2015, 2016, 2018); WNBL Grand Final MVP (2016); TBA All-Star Five (2022); All-Pac-10 (2010); Second-team All Pac-10 (2009)
Medals
Representing New Zealand
Women's basketball
Commonwealth Games
Silver medal – second place	2006 Melbourne	Team
Bronze medal – third place	2018 Gold Coast	Team competition
FIBA Oceania Championships
Silver medal – second place	2007 New Zealand	Team
Silver medal – second place	2011 Australia	Team
Silver medal – second place	2013 Australia / New Zealand	Team
Silver medal – second place	2015 Australia / New Zealand	Team

Micaela Cocks (born 2 May 1986) is a professional basketball player from New Zealand. She currently plays for the Townsville Fire in the WNBL.

== Professional career ==
=== College ===
Cocks played college basketball for the Oregon Ducks in Eugene, Oregon, participating in NCAA Division I. In her final season, she was awarded a place on the All-Pac-10 First-Team.

=== Oregon statistics ===
Legend
GP	Games played	GS	Games started	MPG	Minutes per game
FG%	Field goal percentage	3P%	3-point field goal percentage	FT%	Free throw percentage
RPG	Rebounds per game	APG	Assists per game	SPG	Steals per game
BPG	Blocks per game	PPG	Points per game	**Bold**	Career high

Year	Team	GP	Points	FG%	3P%	FT%	RPG	APG	SPG	BPG	PPG
2006-07	Oregon	31	106	**43.4%**	37.2%	**88.9%**	0.7	1.1	0.3	-	3.4
2007-08	Oregon	30	202	37.4%	36.7%	81.3%	3.1	1.3	0.6	0.0	6.7
2008-09	Oregon	30	404	38.4%	**39.3%**	86.0%	2.6	1.5	0.8	0.1	13.5
2009-10	Oregon	**34**	**483**	40.7%	32.6%	86.5%	**3.2**	**2.9**	**0.9**	**0.1**	**14.2**
Career		125	1195	39.5%	36.5%	85.9%	2.4	1.7	0.7	0.0	9.6

=== Europe ===
Cocks first travelled to Poland after signing with Energa Torun. However, she would only play four games before transferring to France, to play for Cote d'Opale Basket Calais. Once again, she would only participate in four games until her season was cut short.

=== Australia ===
Micaela Cocks was signed for the 2011–12 season, with the Townsville Fire. She has since been a strong, consistent member of their roster. Playing an instrumental role in their title runs in 2015 and 2016, alongside the likes of Suzy Batkovic and Cayla George. In the 2016 WNBL Finals, against the Perth Lynx, Cocks was awarded the WNBL Grand Final Most Valuable Player Award for her showings through the series. Cocks has been re-signed for the 2016–17 and 2017–18 seasons.

== National team ==
At the 2006 Commonwealth Games she won a silver medal as part of the Tall Ferns New Zealand women's basketball team. She represented New Zealand and the Tall Ferns again at the 2008 Summer Olympics. She has taken home a silver medal at the FIBA Oceania Championship on four occasions. She has also participated in two Olympic qualifying tournaments with the Tall Ferns, in 2012 and 2016. Unfortunately, both times, the Tall Ferns fell short on Olympic qualification.
