= Annalise Pickrel =

American basketball player

No. 4 – Dandenong Rangers
- Position: Forward
- League: WNBL

Personal information
- Born: May 2, 1992 (age 34) Grand Rapids, Michigan, U.S.
- Listed height: 6 ft 3 in (1.91 m)

Career information
- High school: Catholic Central High School
- College: Michigan State (2010–2014)
- WNBA draft: 2014: undrafted
- Playing career: 2014–present

Career history
- 2014–present: Dandenong Rangers

Annalise Pickrel (born May 2, 1992) is an American professional basketball player. She currently plays for the Dandenong Rangers in the WNBL.

== Career ==
=== Australia ===
After leaving college, Pickrel failed to get drafted and soon after headed to Australia to play in the Women's National Basketball League with the Dandenong Rangers. She found herself on a roster alongside Penny Taylor and Cappie Pondexter. During the off-season, Pickrel narrowly failed to get a place on the roster of the Los Angeles Sparks. She then returned to Dandenong for the 2015–16 season.

== Michigan State statistics ==
Legend
GP	Games played	GS	Games started	MPG	Minutes per game
FG%	Field goal percentage	3P%	3-point field goal percentage	FT%	Free throw percentage
RPG	Rebounds per game	APG	Assists per game	SPG	Steals per game
BPG	Blocks per game	PPG	Points per game	**Bold**	Career high

Year	Team	GP	Points	FG%	3P%	FT%	RPG	APG	SPG	BPG	PPG
2010–11	Michigan State	31	102	40.6	33.3	69.2	2.4	0.5	0.2	0.5	3.3
2011–12	Michigan State	28	70	32.9	28.9	62.5	2.2	0.5	0.3	0.3	2.5
2012–13	Michigan State	**34**	316	41.1	36.7	**77.3**	4.5	1.0	**0.9**	0.5	9.3
2013–14	Michigan State	33	**409**	**46.2**	**37.2**	75.9	**6.8**	**2.6**	0.8	**1.2**	**12.4**
Career	Michigan State	126	897	42.3	35.8	74.1	4.1	1.2	0.6	0.7	7.1
