= Kelly Bowen =

Australian basketball player

No. 9 – Waverly Falcons
- Position: Forward
- League: WNBL

Personal information
- Born: 7 August 1989 (age 37) Frankston, Victoria
- Listed height: 6 ft 0 in (1.83 m)

Career information
- College: Gonzaga (2008–2012)
- Playing career: 2012–present

Career history
- 2012–2013: Townsville Fire
- 2014–2015: Melbourne Boomers
- 2015–2016: Adelaide Lightning
- 2016–2018: Melbourne Boomers

Career highlights
- 3x WCC Champion (2009, 2010, 2011); All-WCC Freshman Team (2009); Represented Australia in the 2016, 3x3 World Championships in China. Named Australia's number 1, 3x3 player in 2016

Kelly Bowen (born 7 August 1989) is an Australian professional basketball player.

== Career ==
=== College ===
From 2008 to 2012, Bowen played for the Gonzaga Bulldogs located in Spokane, Washington. Participating in the NCAA's Division I and primarily in the West Coast Conference. During her time there, she played alongside Courtney Vandersloot.

=== WNBL ===
After a successful college career in the United States, Bowen began her WNBL career in Queensland, with the Townsville Fire. After a one-year absence, she returned home to Victoria, with the rebranded, Melbourne Boomers. She then moved to the Adelaide Lightning, where she would be co-captain alongside Leilani Mitchell.

=== International ===
During 2016, Bowen represented Australia in the 3x3 World Championships, held in Guangzhou, China. Bowen was ranked Australia's number 1, 3x3 player during 2016.
