= Chevannah Paalvast =

New Zealand basketball player

Personal information
- Born: 4 September 1991 (age 35) West Auckland, New Zealand
- Listed height: 5 ft 11 in (1.80 m)

Career information
- College: Monmouth (2010–2014)
- WNBA draft: 2014: undrafted
- Playing career: 2014–present
- Position: Guard

Career history
- 2014: Waitakere Lady Rangers
- 2015: Southern Peninsula Sharks
- 2015–2017: Townsville Fire
- 2017–2018: Canberra Capitals
- 2020: Bendigo Spirit

Career highlights
- WNBL champion (2016); Third-team All-MAAC (2014)
Medals
Representing New Zealand
Women's basketball
Commonwealth Games
Bronze medal – third place	2018 Gold Coast	Team competition
FIBA Oceania Championships
Silver medal – second place	2015 Australia / New Zealand	Team

Chevannah Paalvast (born 4 September 1991) is a professional basketball player from New Zealand.

== Professional career ==
=== College ===
Paalvast played college basketball for the Monmouth Hawks in West Long Branch, New Jersey, participating in NCAA Division I. In her final season, she was awarded a place on the All-MAAC Third Team.

=== Monmouth statistics ===
Legend
GP	Games played	GS	Games started	MPG	Minutes per game
FG%	Field goal percentage	3P%	3-point field goal percentage	FT%	Free throw percentage
RPG	Rebounds per game	APG	Assists per game	SPG	Steals per game
BPG	Blocks per game	PPG	Points per game	**Bold**	Career high

Year	Team	GP	Points	FG%	3P%	FT%	RPG	APG	SPG	BPG	PPG
2010-11	Monmouth	28	58	28.8%	26.3%	50.0%	1.5	0.5	0.3	-	2.1
2011-12	Monmouth	32	205	34.8%	**29.6%**	55.1%	3.2	1.5	1.1	0.7	6.4
2012-13	Monmouth	28	307	39.1%	24.6%	57.1%	4.9	1.4	1.0	**0.8**	11.0
2013-14	Monmouth	**33**	**436**	**39.9%**	23.5%	**65.8%**	**5.2**	**2.3**	**1.5**	0.8	**13.2**
Career		121	1006	37.8%	26.0%	59.6%	3.8	1.5	1.0	0.6	8.3

=== Australia ===
After a season with the Southern Peninsula Sharks in the Big V, Paalvast was signed by the WNBL defending champions, the Townsville Fire for the 2015–16 season. She would go on to take home her maiden WNBL title and help the Fire achieve back-to-back titles. Paalvast has been re-signed for the 2016–17 season.

In September 2017, Paalvast was signed by the Canberra Capitals for the 2017–18 season.

== National team ==
At the 2015 FIBA Oceania Women's Championship Paalvast made her international debut where she won a silver medal as part of the Tall Ferns New Zealand women's basketball team. She represented New Zealand at FIBA Olympic Qualifying Tournament 2016. Unfortunately, the Tall Ferns fell short on Olympic qualification.
