= Brittany Smart =

American basketball player

No. 2 – Canberra Capitals
- Position: Guard
- League: WNBL

Personal information
- Born: May 28, 1985 (age 41) Xenia, Ohio
- Listed height: 5 ft 9 in (1.75 m)

Career information
- College: Cedarville (2003–2007)
- WNBA draft: 2007: undrafted
- Playing career: 2007–present

Career history
- 2007–2009: Point Chaud Sprimont
- 2010–2013: Kvarnby
- 2013–2014: Northland Luleå BBK
- 2015: Sandringham Sabres
- 2015–2018: Melbourne Boomers
- 2018–2020: Sydney Uni Flames
- 2020–present: Canberra Capitals

Career highlights
- 2000 Point Club - High school; Cedarville University All-Time Leading Scorer; NAIA Division II National Player of the Year - 2007; All-time in NAIA Division II Leading Scorer 3,236; Guard of Year - Basketligan dam - (2014); 1x Basketligan dam Champion (2014); All-Swedish Basketligan dam First Team (2014); 1x All-SEABL Women's Team (2015); SEABL Leading Points Scorer (2015); Melbourne Boomers Most Valuable Player (2017); WNBL Player of the Week

Brittany Smart (born May 28, 1985) is an American professional basketball player.

== Early career ==
=== High school ===
Smart attended 3 different high schools in the Ohio area, ending her high school career at Shawnee High School, Springfield Ohio. Her father, Mike Smart, coached her throughout her high school career. She made the 1st-Team-All-Conference for all four years and led her team to the State Championships. In her senior year, Smart was the leading scorer in the whole of Ohio high school basketball averaging 32.5 points per game and 2,181 points for the season.

=== College ===
Smart signed early to Cedarville University near her hometown of Xenia, Ohio. Declining several Division 1 scholarships, she opted to stay local and go to the same school her grandparents and parents attended.

Smart remains one of Ohio's all-time leading scorers in college basketball, and at the time of her graduation, she was the top scorer in the state of Ohio, men's and women's, with 3,236 Career Points. She remains the Cedarville University All-Time Leading Scorer. In 2003, Smart was crowned the NAIA National Player of the Year. Smart assembled some staggering numbers during her career at Cedarville in which she set 23 career, season, and single-game records. Her 3,236 points is the top mark all-time in NAIA Division II and she is the Ohio college women's basketball career scoring leader for all divisions. Smart was a three-time NAIA All-American and the NAIA Division II National Player of the Year as a senior. The Lady Jackets were 126-16 during her four-year career with two NAIA Division II national runner-up finishes and four conference championships.

She also holds the tournament record for points-in-a-game for NAIA Division II Women's Basketball tournament, 47 points. In 2007, she featured in Sports Illustrated in the “faces in the crowd” segment.

Smart was named MVP of the Coates Sports Management Pro Basketball Exposure Camp in Boston. The two-day event attracted approximately 70 women including several NCAA Division I players, current pro players from overseas, and a few WNBA draftees. It was designed to give players with professional basketball aspirations the opportunity to showcase their skills in front of various pro scouts, coaches, and agents.

As a result of her showing at the camp, Smart received ten offers from various Europeans teams before selecting Point Chaud which is located in Sprimont, Belgium.

== Professional career ==
=== Belgium ===
Smart played her first two years of professional Basketball in Belgium for Point Chaud Sprint from 2007-2009. Her team reached the playoffs both years and she started every game averaging around 15 points per game. She was also in the top 3 for imports of the year her second season there.

=== Sweden ===
In 2012, Smart led Kvarnby Basket to the post-season playoffs for the first time in their existence. They won their first playoff game by a point, 84-83 with Smart scoring 43 points and adding 10 rebounds. Smart was rewarded for her efforts by landing a spot on the All-Swedish Damligan First Team. She was also tabbed the Guard of the Year.

Smart moved up to Lulea after Kvarnby went bankrupt and with Smart's help the team won their first ever Gold Medal in the Swedish National League - SM-Guld.

Throughout the season, Smart led her team in points scored and assists. In the Finals series she averaged 18.7 points, 12.5 rebounds and 2.7 assists.

=== Australia ===
Smart signed with the Sandringham Sabres in the South East Australian Basketball League (SEABL) for the 2015 season. After impressive showings with the Sabres, Smart was signed by the Melbourne Boomers to play in the Women's National Basketball League, Australia's premier women's league and the strongest league in the southern hemisphere. In her first season at Sandringham, Smart was an MVP contender as she led the league in scoring averaging 23.9 points per game. She has been the Sabres standout performer for the last three seasons.

In 2018, Brittany played in the Southeastern Australian Basketball league with the Hobart Chargers averaging 22.1ppg, 5.1reb, 4.2assists per game shooting a high clip of 44.7% from the field. She was in the top 5 of the league in scoring, steals and free throw percentage at 86%. And top 10 in assists. Her team finished 10-10 just outside of the top 8.

Smart signed with the Sandringham Sabres in the South East Australian Basketball League (SEABL) for the 2015 season. After impressive showings with the Sabres, Smart was signed by the Melbourne Boomers to play in the Women's National Basketball League, Australia's premier women's league and the strongest league in the southern hemisphere. [1]

In her first season Smart led the WNBL for three point percentage in 2015/16 with 49.2%, making 30 of her 61 three-pointers. Averaging 10.8 points, 4.7 rebounds, 2.5 assists, and 25.3 minutes per game.

During 2016/17 Smart played 22 games for the Melbourne Boomers, averaging 12.7 points, 4.4 rebounds, 2.5 assists and 1.1 steals per game. At the Melbourne Boomers awards night in February 2017 Smart received the Most Valuable Player (MVP) award as well as the Players’ Player Award.

Smart played her 50th WNBL game for the Melbourne Boomers in November 2017.

In 2020, after two seasons with the Sydney Uni Flames, Smart would sign with the Canberra Capitals for the 2020 season.

== Publishing ==
Smart has also written articles as an experienced athlete and personal trainer for Breaking Muscle Australia.
