= Elyse Penaluna =

Australian basketball player

Bulleen Boomers
- Position: Forward
- League: WNBL

Personal information
- Born: 23 April 1988 (age 38)
- Listed height: 1.93 m (6 ft 4 in)

Elyse Mary Penaluna (born 23 April 1988) is an Australian basketball forward. She has played in the Women's National Basketball League (WNBL) for the Australian Institute of Sport and the Bulleen Boomers, winning a WNBL Championship with that team in 2011/2012. She has been a member of Australia women's national basketball team (the Opals), representing the country in its 2012 Olympic qualifying campaign. Playing for Australia's Australian U21 Sapphires, she won a silver medal at the FIBA Under-21 World Championship for Women in 2007.

== Personal ==
Penaluna was born on 23 April 1988. She is 193 centimetres (76 in) tall, and in 2007, she lived in Craigieburn, Victoria. She was attending the Swinburne University of Technology in 2011.

== Basketball ==
Penaluna plays forward. She is a "tall". In 2007, she averaged 13.6 points per game for the Hume City Broncos in the Big V league despite missing a number of games because of junior national team commitments. In 2011, she played for the Dandenong Rangers in the South East Australian Basketball League (SEABL). That season, she played as a center. In a match against the Hobart Chargers, she scored 29 points and had 6 rebounds in 17 minutes. She injured her knee in the grand final against the Knox Raiders with five minutes left in the game, which her team went on to win. Penaluna was part of the silver medal-winning Sapphire team at the FIBA Under 21 World Championships in Moscow, Russia, in her debut with the team in 2007 She signed a contract to play basketball in Europe during the 2011/2012 season.

=== WNBL ===
Penaluna had a scholarship with the Australian Institute of Sport (AIS) in 2004, and played with the AIS team in the Women's National Basketball League (WNBL). She played for the Bulleen Boomers for the first time in the 2007/2008 season. She was with the team for the 2008/2009 season, in which the team appearing in the league's Grand Final, in which she had 15 points and 11 rebounds. She played for Bulleen again in 2009/2010, when the again team made it to the Grand Final. In an October 2009 game, she had 20 points in a 109–63 victory over the Perth Lynx. In 2010/2011, she played as a forward for the team in every game of the regular season, and averaged 7.4 rebounds per game and had a shooting percentage of 50% from the field. She played for the Bulleen Boomers again in 2011/2012, Her team won the championship that season. and by May, she had re-signed with the team for 2012/2013.

=== National team ===
Penaluna made her debut with national team (the Opals) in a three-game test series against China in 2009. On 2 September 2009, she played in the return game against New Zealand women's national basketball team in the Oceania Championship in Canberra. In 2010, she played in the World Challenge Series against Japan women's national basketball team. The series was three games long, and one of the games was played in Geelong. She played in September 2011 three game Olympic qualification series against the New Zealand women's national basketball team. Her team won the first game. She was a major factor in the Australian's second game win where she scored 17 points. She played in a game against New Zealand in Brisbane that was part of the Oceania qualifying tournament for the Olympics. She did not start, but scored 19 points coming off the bench, 11 of which came in the third quarter. She also represented Australia at the 2011 Summer Universiade in Shenzhen, China, where Australia took home a bronze medal, beating their opposition 66–56 in the bronze medal match. She was named to the 2012 Australia women's national basketball team, but was later "ruled out through injury".
