= Natalie Novosel =

American basketball player (born 1989)

Adelaide Lightning
- Position: Guard
- League: WNBL

Personal information
- Born: November 22, 1989 (age 36) Lexington, Kentucky, U.S.
- Listed height: 5 ft 11 in (1.80 m)
- Listed weight: 165 lb (75 kg)

Career information
- High school: Lexington Catholic (Lexington, Kentucky)
- College: Notre Dame (2008–2012)
- WNBA draft: 2012: 1st round, 8th overall pick
- Drafted by: Washington Mystics
- Playing career: 2012–present

Career history
- 2012: Washington Mystics
- 2012–2013: CSM Târgovişte
- 2013–2014: Dandenong Rangers
- 2015–2016: Townsville Fire
- 2016–2017: Dandenong Rangers
- 2017–present: Adelaide Lightning

Career highlights
- Big East Most Improved Player (2011); 2x First-team All-Big East (2011, 2012); Big East All-Freshman Team (2009)
- Stats at WNBA.com
- Stats at Basketball Reference
Medals
Women's basketball
Representing United States
World University Games
Gold medal – first place	2011 Shenzhen	Team

Natalie Frances Novosel (born November 22, 1989) is an American professional basketball player. Born in Lexington, Kentucky, she went to Lexington Catholic High School and played collegiately at Notre Dame.

== USA Basketball ==
Novosel played on the team representing the US at the 2011 World University Games held in Shenzhen, China. The team, coached by Bill Fennelly, won all six games to earn the gold medal. Novosel averaged 4.5 points per game.

== WNBA career ==
Novosel was selected in the first round of the 2012 WNBA draft (8th overall) by the Washington Mystics, and was later cut by the Mystics before the 2013 WNBA season.

== Career statistics ==
Legend
GP	Games played	GS	Games started	MPG	Minutes per game	RPG	Rebounds per game
APG	Assists per game	SPG	Steals per game	BPG	Blocks per game	PPG	Points per game
TO	Turnovers per game	FG%	Field-goal percentage	3P%	3-point field-goal percentage	FT%	Free-throw percentage
**Bold**	Career best	°	League leader

=== WNBA ===
WNBA regular season statistics
Year	Team	GP	GS	MPG	FG%	3P%	FT%	RPG	APG	SPG	BPG	TO	PPG
2012	Washington	31	0	9.9	33.7	22.0	75.9	1.3	0.7	0.5	0.1	0.6	3.2
**Career**	1 year, 1 team	31	0	9.9	33.7	22.0	75.9	1.3	0.7	0.5	0.1	0.6	3.2

=== College ===
NCAA statistics
Year	Team	GP	Points	FG%	3P%	FT%	RPG	APG	SPG	BPG	PPG
2008-09	Notre Dame	31	214	**49.3**	10.0	72.2	2.9	1.5	1.5	0.1	6.9
2009-10	Notre Dame	35	176	42.8	35.0	76.1	2.2	1.7	1.3	0.2	5.0
2010-11	Notre Dame	39	588	45.2	**41.3**	78.9	4.0	1.9	**1.9**	0.3	15.1
2011-12	Notre Dame	**39**	**591**	42.0	41.1	**82.9**	**4.1**	**2.0**	1.2	**0.4**	**15.2**
**Career**		144	1569	44.2	39.2	78.9	3.3	1.8	1.5	0.2	10.9

== Personal life ==
Shortly after the draft, Novosel said that her first choice of teams was the Mystics, adding that she "couldn't be any happier" that the team selected her. She had personal reasons for wanting to play in Washington, most notably that her twin brother, Nathan, was set to begin a two-year position in the city with Teach for America in late summer 2012.
