= Cayla George =

Australian basketball player (born 1989)

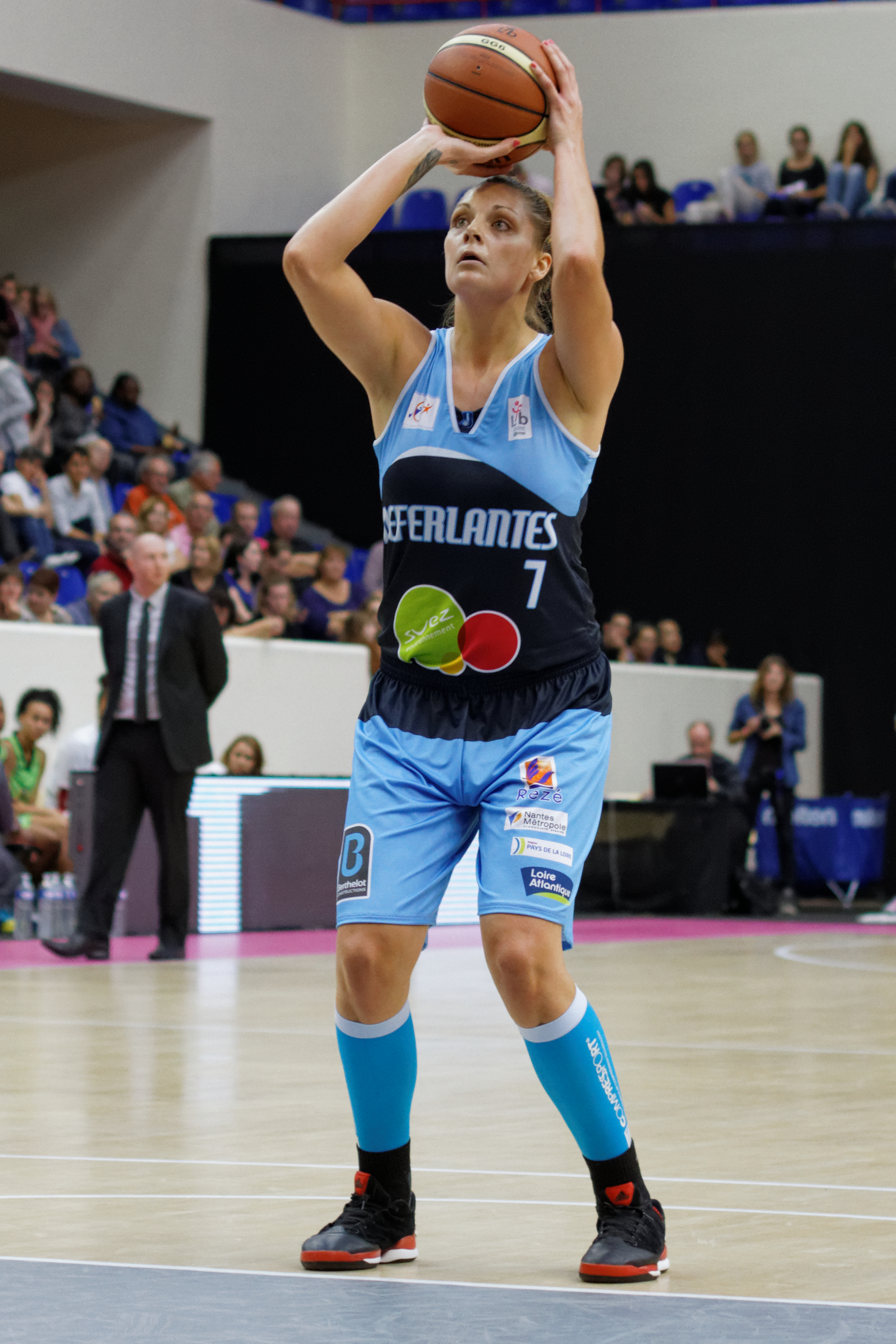
- George with Nantes Rezé Basket in 2013

Personal information
- Born: 1 May 1989 (age 37) Mount Barker, Australia
- Listed height: 6 ft 4 in (1.93 m)
- Listed weight: 192 lb (87 kg)

Career information
- Playing career: 2005–present
- Position: Forward / center

Career history
- 2005–2008: Australian Institute of Sport
- 2008–2010: Adelaide Lightning
- 2010–2012: Logan Thunder
- 2011–2013: Cairns Dolphins
- 2012–2013: Pays d'Aix Basket 13
- 2013–2014: Nantes Rezé Basket
- 2014–2016: Townsville Fire
- 2015: Phoenix Mercury
- 2016–2017: UNIQA Sopron
- 2017: Phoenix Mercury
- 2017–2018: Townsville Fire
- 2018: Dallas Wings
- 2018–2023: Melbourne Boomers
- 2019: Hobart Huskies
- 2021: Mackay Meteorettes
- 2022: Cairns Dolphins
- 2023: Las Vegas Aces
- 2023–2025: Sydney Flames
- 2024–2025: Cathay Life Tigers
- 2025: Cairns Dolphins

Career highlights
- WNBA champion (2023); 4× WNBL champion (2015, 2016, 2018, 2022); WSBL champion (2024); WSBL Finals MVP (2024); WNBL Most Valuable Player (2023); 3× All-WNBL First Team (2015, 2020, 2023); 3× All-WNBL Second Team (2019–20, 2022, 2026)
- Stats at Basketball Reference
Medals
Women's basketball
Representing Australia
Olympic Games
Bronze medal – third place	2024 Paris	Team
FIBA World Cup
Silver medal – second place	2018 Spain
Bronze medal – third place	2014 Turkey
Bronze medal – third place	2022 Australia
Asia Cup
Gold medal – first place	2025 China
Bronze medal – third place	2019 Bangalore
Commonwealth Games
Gold medal – first place	2018 Gold Coast	Team

Cayla George (née Francis; born 1 May 1989) is an Australian professional basketball player. She has played in the Women's National Basketball League (WNBL) and Women's National Basketball Association (WNBA). In 2022, she won her fourth WNBL championship. In 2023, she was named WNBL Most Valuable Player and won a WNBA championship.

George made her Opals debut in 2008 and played at the 2020 Tokyo Olympics. At the 2024 Summer Olympics she earned a bronze medal with the Australian team.

She currently sits on the board of the Australian Basketball Players' Association.

== Early life ==
George was born on 1 May 1989 in Mount Barker, South Australia. Her mother, older sister and half sister live in South Australia, while her father lives in Cairns. She lived with her father in Fiji for four months during 2001.

George is 194 centimetres (76 in) tall The WNBL lists her height at 192 centimetres (76 in) though The Advertiser of Adelaide, list her height as 193 centimetres (76 in) and Logan Thunder and FIBA lists her height as 192 centimetres (76 in).

George started out playing netball, but ultimately chose basketball because she preferred the contact aspect of the sport.

== Playing career ==
George played in the Central Australian Basketball League for the Eastern Mavericks. She was with the team for the 2007 season and went on to help her team win their first league championship in 2008. She was named the league's best and fairest, winning the Halls Medal. She was also named the league's player of the year in 2008. She averaged 22.4 points per game in 2008. She led the league that season in offensive rebounding with 4.8 per game. She also led the league in defensive rebounds per game with 14.2. She led in the rebounding category with 18.9 per game.

In 2009, George played for the Ballarat Lady Miners in the SEABL. In 2010, she played for the Sandringham Sabres in the SEABL. In 2011, she played in the Queensland Basketball League for the Cairns Dolphins. Her play with the team drew the attention the national selectors. In the 2011 season, she was the player of the round in two separate weeks. The first time was in round two. The second time was in round four. She was named a third time in round nine. In an April 2011 game in the SEABL, she scored 26 points and had 16 rebounds.

George earned a silver medal with South Australia Metro at the 2005 U18 National Junior Championships. She participated in the U16 National Junior Championships in 2005, playing for South Australia Country. In 2006, she participated in the U18 National Junior Championships for South Australia Country. In 2006, she was named the South Australian Under 21 Player of the Year. She has won the R.E. Staunton award winner for Female MVP at U20 National Championships in 2008.In 2019 she join the new Hobart women's team the Hobart Huskies for the first three game of the NBL1 season.

=== WNBL ===
George played for the Australian Institute of Sport team for three years, including for the 2005/2006 season. In 2007, she won the WNBL Bettie Watson Rookie of the Year. During the 2007/2008 season, her Australian Institute of Sport team won eight games.

George signed with the Adelaide Lightning in 2008. She played with the team during the 2008/2009 and 2009/2010 seasons. By November 2008 in the 2008/2009 season, she was averaging 16 points a game and 10.6 rebounds a game. In a November 2008 90–62 win over the Australian Institute of Sport, she scored 17 points, and had 7 rebounds in the game. In a November 2009 game against the Australian Institute of Sport which her won 100–77, while on the court 23:38 minutes, she scored 24 points and had a field goal percentage of 75%. In an October 2009 game Adelaide won 75–66 against Dandenong, she had 26 points and 17 rebounds, and had a field goal percentage of 50%. She did not miss a single one of her free throw shots.

George joined the Logan Thunder in 2010. She played for them in 2010/2011 and 2011/2012. In November 2011, she helped her team stage a come from behind victory against the West Coast Waves. She wore no. 4 for the team. In January 2012, she was one of three players seriously considered for player of the week but lost to American Shanavia Dowdell.

George returned to the WNBL with the Townsville Fire in 2014. She played two seasons for the Fire.

George joined the Melbourne Boomers for the 2018–19 WNBL season.

She was named to the All-WNBL Second Team in the 2025–26 WNBL season.

=== WNBA ===
On 4 February 2015, George signed with the WNBA's Phoenix Mercury. In February 2017, George was re-acquired by the Mercury.

On 2 February 2018, George was traded to the Connecticut Sun. On 16 May 2018, George was waived by the Connecticut Sun. On 3 June 2018, George was signed by the Dallas Wings.

On 1 February 2023, George signed as a free agent with the Las Vegas Aces.

== National team career ==
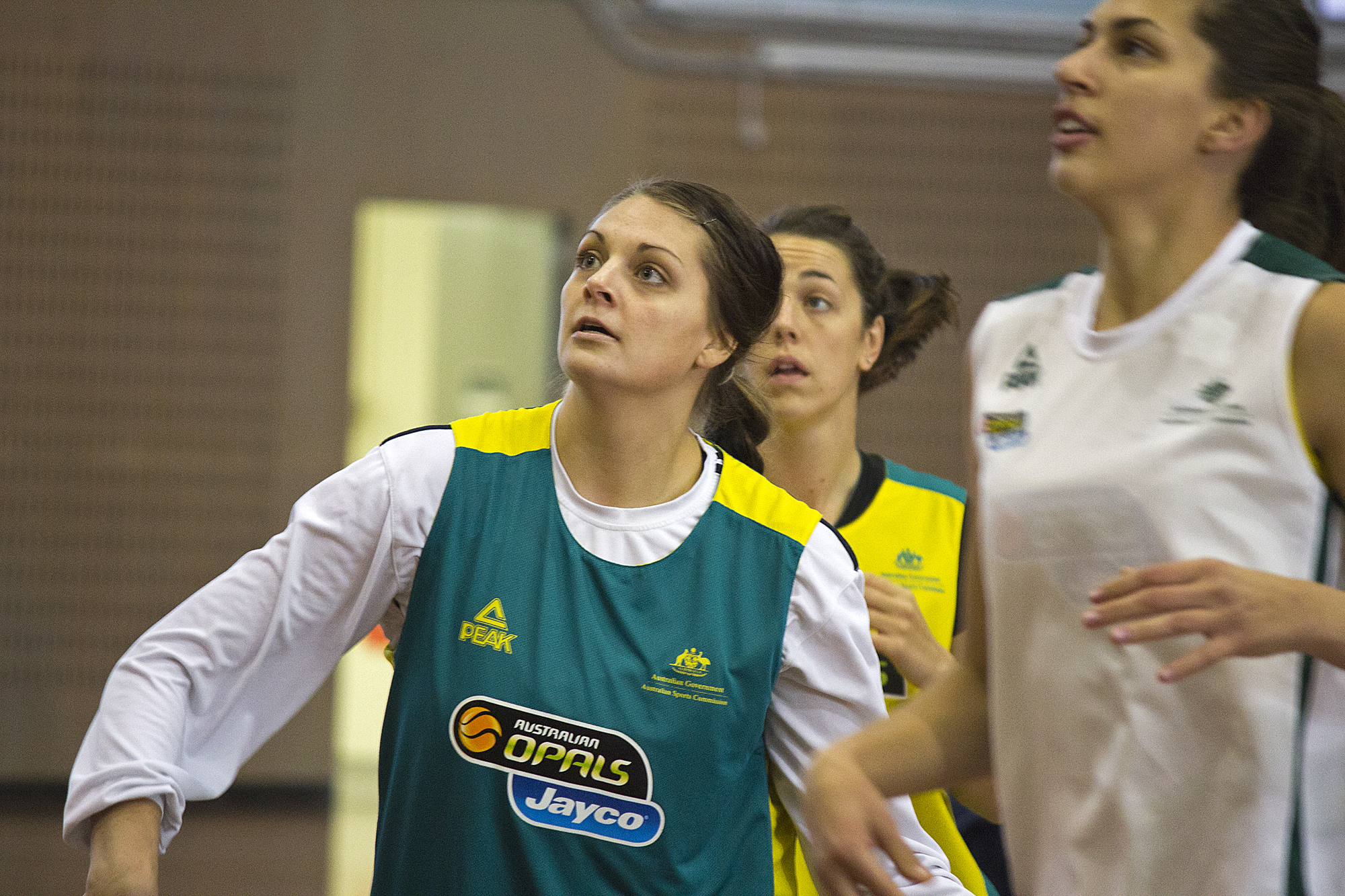
George (green top) with the Opals in 2012

George plays center for the Opals. She was a member of the 2008 Opals squad. In late March, early April 2008, she participated in a week long training camp with the national team in Canberra. In 2008, she had her first Opals cap in a game against New Zealand women's national basketball team. She was a member of the 2009 Opals squad. She was a member of the 2011 Opals squad and, as a member of the team, she earned a gold medal at the FIBA Oceania Championship. In June 2011, she participated in a national team training camp in Canberra. In late July 2011, she played in a three-game test series against China played in Queensland. She was scheduled to participate in the national team training camp held from 14 to 18 May 2012 at the Australian Institute of Sport.

George has also played for Australia's age restricted national sides. She has 31 caps for Australia's junior national team and 14 appearances for the Young Australia team. In 2006, as a member of the Gems, she participated in the Taipei hosted William Jones Cup. In 2006, she was a member of Australia's Under-21 national team, the Sapphires. As a member of the Australian team at the 2007 FIBA U19 World Championship for Women, she finished fifth. She averaged 12.1 points and 7.1 rebounds per game in the competition. In the first-round game against Brazil, she scored 20 points, and went three for three in three-point range. She also had 10 rebounds in the game against Brazil. She averaged 21.1 points per game, 7.1 rebounds per game and 0.3 assists per game. She played 204 minutes in 9 games. She made 43 out of 99 attempted field goals. She was 14/16 at the free throw line. She had 20 offensive rebounds and 44 defensive rebounds. George earned a silver medal at the 2007 FIBA World Championship for Under 21 Women held in Moscow. At the 2007 FIBA U21 World Championship for Women, she averaged 8.6 points per game, 7.6 rebounds per game and 0.5 assists per game. In the competition, she wore number 11. In 2011, she represented Australia at the World University Games.

George played for the Opals at the 2020 Tokyo Olympics. They lost to the United States in the quarter-finals.

In May 2025, George was named in the Opals squad for the 2025 FIBA Women's Asia Cup in China.

== Career statistics ==
Legend
GP	Games played	GS	Games started	MPG	Minutes per game	RPG	Rebounds per game
APG	Assists per game	SPG	Steals per game	BPG	Blocks per game	PPG	Points per game
TO	Turnovers per game	FG%	Field-goal percentage	3P%	3-point field-goal percentage	FT%	Free-throw percentage
**Bold**	Career best	°	League leader

=== WNBA ===
†	Denotes seasons in which George won a WNBA championship

==== Regular season ====
WNBA regular season statistics
Year	Team	GP	GS	MPG	FG%	3P%	FT%	RPG	APG	SPG	BPG	TO	PPG
2015	Phoenix	**34**	**2**	**12.7**	.427	.283	**.864**	**3.1**	**0.7**	**0.4**	**0.6**	0.8	**5.0**
2016	Did not play (Olympics)												
2017	Phoenix	32	0	11.9	.376	.283	.643	2.7	0.5	0.3	0.4	**0.5**	3.3
2018	Dallas	23	1	10.7	**.436**	**.308**	.500	2.8	**0.7**	0.1	0.2	0.6	3.6
2019	Did not play (waived)												
2020	Did not appear in league												
2021	Did not appear in league												
2022	Did not appear in league												
2023^{†}	Las Vegas	32	0	8.5	.288	.234	.000	1.8	0.4	0.3	0.2	0.8	2.3
**Career**	4 years, 3 teams	121	3	11.0	.384	.273	.689	2.6	0.6	0.3	0.4	0.7	3.6

==== Playoffs ====
WNBA playoff statistics
Year	Team	GP	GS	MPG	FG%	3P%	FT%	RPG	APG	SPG	BPG	TO	PPG
2015	Phoenix	3	0	**9.0**	**.375**	**.500**	—	**2.7**	**1.0**	**1.7**	**1.7**	1.3	2.7
2017	Phoenix	2	0	0.5	.000	—	—	0.5	0.0	0.0	0.5	0.5	0.0
2018	Dallas	1	0	5.0	.500	—	—	1.0	0.0	0.0	0.0	1.0	**4.0**
2023^{†}	Las Vegas	**8**	**1**	6.0	.200	.250	**1.000**	0.6	0.5	0.4	0.0	**0.4**	1.6
**Career**	4 years, 3 teams	14	1	5.8	.273	.313	1.000	1.1	0.5	0.6	0.4	0.6	1.8

== See also ==
- List of Australian WNBA players
