= South East Queensland Stars =

- Leagues: WNBL
- Founded: 2015
- Dissolved: 2016
- History: SEQ Stars; 2015–2016
- Arena: Logan Metro Sports Centre
- Location: Logan, Queensland
- Team colours: Blue/Black/Silver
- Championships: 0

The South East Queensland Stars were an Australian professional basketball team that competed in the Women's National Basketball League (WNBL) for one season. The team was based in the South East Queensland city of Logan.

== History ==
The South East Queensland Stars were founded in March 2015 and entered the WNBL in the 2015–16 season. The team was highlighted by coach Shane Heal and Australian Opal Erin Phillips. In February 2016, Stars chairman Jarrod Sierocki placed the team into liquidation and ceased operations immediately, citing financial losses and a lack of crowd and sponsor support. Incoming sponsors La Trobe Financial and Griffith University set up a rescue package that let the Stars play out their last five games of the season. Coach Heal was replaced for the final five games of the season by Paul Goriss.
