= List of 2021–22 WNBL season transactions =

This is a list of transactions that have taken place during the off-season and the 2021–22 WNBL season.

== Front office movements ==
=== Head coach changes ===
Off-season

Departure date	Team	Outgoing head coach	Reason for departure	Hire date	Incoming head coach	Last coaching position	Ref.
March 12	Sydney Uni Flames	(Australia) Katrina Hibbert	Contract expired	March 16	(Australia) Shane Heal	Sutherland Sharks head coach (2018–20)	

== Player movement ==
=== Free agency ===
Player	Date signed	New team	Former team	Ref
(Australia) Lauren Mansfield	April 5	Sydney Uni Flames		
(Australia) Funda Nakkaşoğlu	April 5	Sydney Uni Flames		
(Australia) Mia Murray	April 8	Townsville Fire		
(Australia) Stephanie Reid	April 8	Townsville Fire		
(Australia) Darcee Garbin	April 15	Perth Lynx		
(Australia) Lauren Nicholson	April 15	Townsville Fire		
(Australia) Ezi Magbegor	April 21	Melbourne Boomers		
(Australia) Nadeen Payne	April 22	Townsville Fire		
(Australia) Tessa Lavey	April 23	Bendigo Spirit		
(Australia) Cayla George	April 28	Melbourne Boomers		
(Australia) Ashleigh Isenbarger	April 28	Perth Lynx		
(Australia) Leilani Mitchell	April 29	Bendigo Spirit	Southside Flyers	
(Australia) Lauren Scherf	April 30	Perth Lynx	Sydney Uni Flames	
(Australia) Shyla Heal	April 30	Sydney Uni Flames	Townsville Fire	
(Australia) Stephanie Talbot	May 3	Adelaide Lightning		
(Australia) Kiera Rowe	May 3	Sydney Uni Flames		
(Australia) Anneli Maley	May 4	Bendigo Spirit	Sydney Uni Flames	
(Australia) Tess Madgen	May 6	Melbourne Boomers		
(Australia) Lara McSpadden	May 6	Townsville Fire		
(Australia) Demi Skinner	May 7	Bendigo Spirit		
(Australia) Keely Froling	May 7	Sydney Uni Flames	Canberra Capitals	
(Australia) Madeleine Garrick	May 11	Bendigo Spirit	Melbourne Boomers	
(Australia) Emma Clarke	May 12	Perth Lynx		
(Australia) Sam Simons	May 13	Adelaide Lightning	Saint Mary's Gaels (USA)	
(Australia) Rebecca Pizzey	May 13	Sydney Uni Flames	Southside Flyers	
(Australia) Piper Dunlop	May 14	Bendigo Spirit		
(Australia) Megan McKay	May 18	Bendigo Spirit	Townsville Fire	
(Australia) Cassidy McLean	May 21	Bendigo Spirit		
(Australia) Louise Brown	May 22	Melbourne Boomers	Nunawading Spectres (VIC)	
(Australia) Taylor Ortlepp	May 24	Adelaide Lightning		
(New Zealand) Mary Goulding	May 25	Bendigo Spirit		
(United States) Stephanie Watts	May 25	Sydney Uni Flames	North Carolina Tar Heels (USA)	
(Australia) Lily Scanlon	May 31	Melbourne Boomers	Gonzaga Bulldogs (USA)	
(Australia) Chelsea Brook	June 3	Adelaide Lightning		
(Australia) Kelsey Griffin	June 3	Canberra Capitals		
(Australia) Jenna O'Hea	June 8	Southside Flyers		
(Australia) Kelly Wilson	June 10	Canberra Capitals	Bendigo Spirit	
(Australia) Sara Blicavs	June 10	Southside Flyers		
(New Zealand) Kalani Purcell	June 10	Sydney Uni Flames	Melbourne Boomers	
(Australia) Ella Batish	June 11	Adelaide Lightning		
(United States) Lindsay Allen	June 11	Melbourne Boomers	NIKA Syktyvkar (RUS)	
(United States) Monique Billings	June 15	Townsville Fire	Nadezhda Orenburg (RUS)	
(Australia) Rebecca Cole	June 16	Southside Flyers		
(Australia) Tahlia Tupaea	June 17	Canberra Capitals		
(Australia) Alanna Smith	June 18	Adelaide Lightning		
(Australia) Aimie Clydesdale	June 18	Southside Flyers		
(Australia) Tayla Brazel	June 22	Adelaide Lightning	Sturt Sabres (SA)	
(Australia) Alicia Froling	June 22	Canberra Capitals	Bendigo Spirit	
(Australia) Rachel Jarry	June 22	Southside Flyers		
(Australia) Maddison Rocci	June 23	Southside Flyers	Canberra Capitals	
(Australia) Alex Ciabattoni	June 24	Perth Lynx		
(Australia) Kate Gaze	June 24	Southside Flyers	Townsville Fire	
(United States) Brittney Sykes	June 25	Canberra Capitals	OGM Ormanspor (TUR)	
(United States) Leaonna Odom	June 25	Sydney Uni Flames	New York Liberty (USA)	
(Australia) Rachel Brewster	June 28	Melbourne Boomers		
(United States) Brittany Smart	June 29	Canberra Capitals		
(United States) Emilee Harmon	June 29	Southside Flyers	Dandenong Rangers (VIC)	
(United States) Marina Mabrey	July 1	Perth Lynx	Bnot Hertzeliya (ISR)	
(Australia) Jade Melbourne	July 8	Canberra Capitals		
(Australia) Brooke Basham	July 9	Adelaide Lightning		
(New Zealand) Ashleigh Karaitiana	July 13	Melbourne Boomers		
(Australia) Marena Whittle	July 14	Adelaide Lightning		
(United States) Tiffany Mitchell	July 15	Melbourne Boomers	Elitzur Ramla (ISR)	
(United States) Sug Sutton	July 15	Townsville Fire	Ślęza Wrocław (POL)	
(Australia) Emma Mahady	July 20	Sydney Uni Flames	Albury Wodonga Bandits (NSW)	
(New Zealand) Micaela Cocks	July 21	Townsville Fire	Townsville Flames (QLD)	
(Australia) Mackenzie Clinch Hoycard	July 22	Perth Lynx		
(Canada) Katherine Plouffe	July 30	Bendigo Spirit	Basket Landes (FRA)	
(Australia) Katie Deeble	July 31	Sydney Uni Flames	Centre of Excellence (ACT)	
(Australia) Chyra Evans	July 31	Sydney Uni Flames	Centre of Excellence (ACT)	
(United States) Jackie Young	August 3	Perth Lynx	Ramat Hasharon (ISR)	
(Australia) Carla Drennan	September 1	Townsville Fire	Logan Thunder (QLD)	
(Australia) Aliza Fabbro	September 1	Townsville Fire		
(Australia) Alana Goodchild	September 8	Bendigo Spirit	Centre of Excellence (ACT)	
(Australia) Bella Stratford	September 8	Bendigo Spirit	Cal State Fullerton Titans (USA)	
(Australia) Tayah Burrows	September 10	Perth Lynx		
(Australia) Tess Heal	September 13	Melbourne Boomers	Eltham Wildcats (VIC)	
(Australia) Jasmin Fejo	September 17	Adelaide Lightning		
(Australia) Emma Gandini	September 21	Perth Lynx	Willetton Tigers (WA)	
(Australia) Mia Jacobs	September 21	Perth Lynx	Kalamunda Eastern Suns (WA)	
(Australia) Mia Satie	September 21	Perth Lynx	Perry Lakes Hawks (WA)	
(Australia) Abby Cubillo	September 22	Canberra Capitals		
(Australia) Alex Bunton	October 4	Canberra Capitals		
(Australia) Shaneice Swain	October 9	Canberra Capitals	Centre of Excellence (ACT)	
(Australia) Izzy Wright	October 12	Melbourne Boomers		
(Australia) Carly Boag	October 18	Bendigo Spirit	Sydney Uni Flames	
(Australia) Abby Bishop	October 20	Southside Flyers	Virtus Bologna (ITA)	
(Australia) Kristy Wallace	October 21	Southside Flyers	Melbourne Tigers (VIC)	
(Australia) Sherrie Calleia	October 22	Sydney Uni Flames		
(Australia) Morgan Yaeger	October 22	Sydney Uni Flames	Adelaide Lightning	
(United States) Kiana Williams	October 25	Adelaide Lightning	Stanford Cardinal (USA)	
(Australia) Bronte Corke	October 27	Canberra Capitals	Mandurah Magic (WA)	
(Australia) Casey Samuels	October 27	Canberra Capitals	Gold Coast Rollers (QLD)	
(Australia) Abigail Wehrung	November 1	Adelaide Lightning		
(Australia) Abby Solway	November 4	Canberra Capitals	South Georgia Jets (USA)	
(United States) Chelsea Dungee	November 8	Sydney Uni Flames	Galatasaray S.K. (TUR)	
(Australia) Sophie Burrows	November 9	Melbourne Boomers	Diamond Valley Eagles (VIC)	
(United States) Kylee Shook	November 16	Adelaide Lightning	Kayseri (TUR)	
(Australia) Charlise Dunn	November 25	Melbourne Boomers	Centre of Excellence (ACT)	
(Australia) Jacqueline Trotto	November 27	Melbourne Boomers	Ringwood Hawks (VIC)	
(Australia) Alex Wilson	December 16	Bendigo Spirit	Adelaide Lightning	
(United States) Rennia Davis	December 24	Sydney Uni Flames	Tennessee Lady Volunteers (USA)	
(Australia) Sami Whitcomb	December 25	Perth Lynx		
(Australia) Isobel Borlase	January 21	Adelaide Lightning	Centre of Excellence (ACT)	
(Australia) Carley Ernst	January 21	Melbourne Boomers	Bendigo Spirit	
(United States) Shaquita Snow	January 23	Sydney Uni Flames	Free agent	
(New Zealand) Lauryn Hippolite	February 5	Melbourne Boomers	Canterbury Wildcats (NZL)	
(United States) Maria Blazejewski	February 6	Sydney Uni Flames	Montaneras de Morovis (PUR)	
(Australia) Jennie Rintala	February 11	Bendigo Spirit		

=== Released ===
Player	Date signed	Team	Reason	Ref
(United States) Leaonna Odom	October 6	Sydney Uni Flames	Achilles injury	
(Canada) Katherine Plouffe	October 12	Bendigo Spirit	Vaccination concerns	
(New Zealand) Ashleigh Karaitiana	October 19	Melbourne Boomers	Personal reasons	
(United States) Stephanie Watts	December 14	Sydney Uni Flames	Knee injury	
(United States) Chelsea Dungee	December 24	Sydney Uni Flames	Coach's decision	
(Australia) Leilani Mitchell	January 19	Bendigo Spirit	Pregnancy	
(United States) Rennia Davis	January 28	Sydney Uni Flames	Signed overseas	
(United States) Shaquita Snow	January 28	Sydney Uni Flames	Coach's decision	
(Australia) Casey Samuels	February 23	Canberra Capitals	Disciplinary reasons	

=== Going overseas ===
Player	Date signed	New team	Former team	Ref
(Australia) Paige Price	April 6, 2020	Indiana Hoosiers (USA)	Bendigo Spirit	
(Australia) Marianna Tolo	May 25	Basket Landes (FRA)	Canberra Capitals	
(New Zealand) Ashley Taia	August 4	Wetterbygden Sparks (SWE)	Canberra Capitals	
(United States) Alison Schwagmeyer	September 17	WBC Montana 2003 (BUL)	Sydney Uni Flames	

=== Retirement ===
Name	Date	Team(s) played (years)	Notes	Ref.
(Australia) Louella Tomlinson	June 11	Australian Institute of Sport (2004–07); Dandenong Rangers (2011–12); West Coast Waves / Perth Lynx (2014–16); Melbourne Boomers (2017–18); Bendigo Spirit (2018–19); Southside Flyers (2019–20); Adelaide Lightning (2020)	WNBL Champion (2012); Also played college basketball and overseas in Italy, Hungary & Spain.	
(New Zealand) Antonia Farnworth	August 27	Christchurch Sirens (2007–08); Dandenong Rangers (2009–10); Bendigo Spirit (2010–11); Adelaide Lightning (2011–12); West Coast Waves / Perth Lynx (2012–19); Melbourne Boomers (2019–20)	Played across Australia and New Zealand. Represented New Zealand national team for 14 years.	
(Australia) Katie-Rae Ebzery	October 7	Australian Institute of Sport (2005–08); Dandenong Rangers (2008–09); Sydney Uni Flames (2010–16, 2017–18); Perth Lynx (2018–20)	3x All-WNBL Team (2016, 2019–20, 2020); Also played overseas in Russia. Represented Australia national team for 6 years.	

== See also ==
- List of 2021–22 WNBL team rosters
