= List of 2022–23 WNBL team rosters =

2022–23 WNBL season
- League: Women's National Basketball League
- Sport: Basketball
- Teams: 8

WNBL seasons
- ← 2021–22 2023–24 →

Below is a list of the rosters as they currently stand for the upcoming 2022–23 WNBL season.

== Rosters ==
=== Adelaide Lightning ===
2022–23 Adelaide Lightning roster
Players
Coaches

Pos.	No.	Nat.	Name	Ht.
G	3	(Australia)	Basham, Brooke	1.78 m (5 ft 10 in)
G	5	(Australia)	Borlase, Isobel	1.78 m (5 ft 10 in)
G/F	7	(Australia)	Talbot, Stephanie	1.88 m (6 ft 2 in)
F/C	8	(Australia)	Brook, Chelsea	1.88 m (6 ft 2 in)
G	9	(Australia)	Cubillo, Abby	1.61 m (5 ft 3 in)
G/F	12	(Australia)	Simons, Sam	1.88 m (6 ft 2 in)
F/C	13	(United States)	Monroe, Jacinta	1.96 m (6 ft 5 in)
F	20	(Australia)	Batish, Ella	1.88 m (6 ft 2 in)
G/F	21	(Australia)	Whittle, Marena	1.80 m (5 ft 11 in)
G	33	(Australia)	Mansfield, Lauren	1.70 m (5 ft 7 in)
G/F	41	(Australia)	Brazel, Tayla	1.82 m (6 ft 0 in)

Head coach

- (Australia) Natalie Hurst

Assistant coach(es)

- (Australia) Matthew Clarke

Legend

- (C) Team captain
- (DP) Development player
- (I) Import player
- Injured

- Roster
Updated: 14 October 2022

=== Bendigo Spirit ===
2022–23 Bendigo Spirit roster
Players
Coaches

Pos.	No.	Nat.	Name	Ht.
G	4	(Australia)	Wilson, Alex	1.80 m (5 ft 11 in)
G	6	(Australia)	McLean, Cassidy	1.78 m (5 ft 10 in)
F	8	(Australia)	Locandro, Sophia	1.90 m (6 ft 3 in)
F	9	(Australia)	Froling, Alicia	1.90 m (6 ft 3 in)
G	13	(Australia)	Wehrung, Abigail	1.78 m (5 ft 10 in)
F	15	(Australia)	Maley, Anneli	1.88 m (6 ft 2 in)
F/C	16	(Australia)	Dunlop, Piper	1.88 m (6 ft 2 in)
G	22	(Australia)	Wilson, Kelly	1.70 m (5 ft 7 in)
F	23	(Australia)	Griffin, Kelsey	1.88 m (6 ft 2 in)
G	24	(Australia)	Lavey, Tessa	1.72 m (5 ft 8 in)
F/C	25	(Australia)	McKay, Megan	1.92 m (6 ft 4 in)

Head coach

- (New Zealand) Kennedy Kereama

Assistant coach(es)

- (Australia) Deanna Black
- (Australia) Zoe Carr

Legend

- (C) Team captain
- (DP) Development player
- (I) Import player
- Injured

- Roster
Updated: 14 October 2022

=== Canberra Capitals ===
2022–23 Canberra Capitals roster
Players
Coaches

Pos.	No.	Nat.	Name	Ht.
G	2	(United States)	Smart, Brittany	1.70 m (5 ft 7 in)
G	3	(Australia)	Tonks, Elizabeth	1.72 m (5 ft 8 in)
G	5	(Australia)	Melbourne, Jade	1.76 m (5 ft 9 in)
G	6	(Australia)	Swain, Shaneice	1.75 m (5 ft 9 in)
F	8	(Australia)	Pizzey, Rebecca	1.90 m (6 ft 3 in)
G	10	(Australia)	Potter, Gemma	1.82 m (6 ft 0 in)
G	11	(Australia)	Calleia, Sherrie	1.73 m (5 ft 8 in)
F	12	(United States)	Burrell, Rae	1.88 m (6 ft 2 in)
G/F	13	(Australia)	Tugliach, Chloe	1.79 m (5 ft 10 in)
F	22	(Australia)	Whittle-Harmon, Emilee	1.89 m (6 ft 2 in)
F	33	(United States)	Munger, Nicole	1.80 m (5 ft 11 in)
C	43	(Australia)	Bunton, Alex	1.96 m (6 ft 5 in)

Head coach

- (Australia) Kristen Veal

Assistant coach(es)

- (Australia) Angus Bourke

Legend

- (C) Team captain
- (DP) Development player
- (I) Import player
- Injured

- Roster
Updated: 1 February 2023

=== Melbourne Boomers ===
2022–23 Melbourne Boomers roster
Players
Coaches

Pos.	No.	Nat.	Name	Ht.
G	0	(Australia)	Goodchild, Miela	1.78 m (5 ft 10 in)
G	2	(New Zealand)	Hippolite, Lauryn	1.74 m (5 ft 9 in)
G	3	(Australia)	Wallace, Kristy	1.80 m (5 ft 11 in)
G	4	(Australia)	Burrows, Sophie	1.84 m (6 ft 0 in)
G	6	(Australia)	Brewster, Rachel	1.80 m (5 ft 11 in)
F	7	(Australia)	Brown, Louise	1.90 m (6 ft 3 in)
G	9	(Australia)	Madgen, Tess (injured)	1.80 m (5 ft 11 in)
G	10	(Australia)	Murray, Mia	1.85 m (6 ft 1 in)
F	12	(New Zealand)	Davidson, Penina	1.90 m (6 ft 3 in)
F	20	(United States)	Nelson-Ododa, Olivia	1.96 m (6 ft 5 in)
F/C	22	(Australia)	George, Cayla (C)	1.92 m (6 ft 4 in)
G	25	(United States)	Mitchell, Tiffany	1.75 m (5 ft 9 in)

Head coach

- (Australia) Chris Lucas

Assistant coach(es)

- (Australia) Kristi Harrower

Legend

- (C) Team captain
- (DP) Development player
- (I) Import player
- Injured

- Roster
Updated: 1 February 2023

=== Perth Lynx ===
2022–23 Perth Lynx roster
Players
Coaches

Pos.	No.	Nat.	Name	Ht.
G	6	(Australia)	Forster, Chloe	1.76 m (5 ft 9 in)
G/F	7	(Australia)	Kelley, Desiree	1.75 m (5 ft 9 in)
G	9	(Australia)	Sharp, Alexandra	1.85 m (6 ft 1 in)
C	11	(Australia)	Scherf, Lauren	1.96 m (6 ft 5 in)
F/C	12	(Australia)	Clinch Hoycard, Mackenzie	1.90 m (6 ft 3 in)
C	13	(Australia)	Edwards, Jessie	1.92 m (6 ft 4 in)
G	21	(United States)	Ryan, Robbi	1.75 m (5 ft 9 in)
G	22	(Australia)	Burrows, Tayah	1.79 m (5 ft 10 in)
G/F	25	(Australia)	Atwell, Amy	1.83 m (6 ft 0 in)
G	31	(Australia)	Gandini, Emma	1.72 m (5 ft 8 in)
G	32	(Australia)	Whitcomb, Sami	1.78 m (5 ft 10 in)
F	55	(Australia)	Bibby, Chloe	1.85 m (6 ft 1 in)

Head coach

- (Australia) Ryan Petrik

Assistant coach(es)

- (Australia) Brad Robbins

Legend

- (C) Team captain
- (DP) Development player
- (I) Import player
- Injured

- Roster
Updated: 14 October 2022

=== Southside Flyers ===
2022–23 Southside Flyers roster
Players
Coaches

Pos.	No.	Nat.	Name	Ht.
G	1	(Australia)	Cole, Rebecca	1.78 m (5 ft 10 in)
G	3	(Australia)	Rocci, Aimie (injured)	1.78 m (5 ft 10 in)
F	6	(United States)	Thornton, Kayla	1.85 m (6 ft 1 in)
G	9	(Australia)	Rocci, Maddison	1.68 m (5 ft 6 in)
F/C	10	(Australia)	Bishop, Abby	1.89 m (6 ft 2 in)
F	11	(Australia)	Ernst, Carley	1.96 m (6 ft 5 in)
F	13	(Australia)	Puoch, Nyadiew	1.86 m (6 ft 1 in)
G	14	(Australia)	Conti, Monique	1.65 m (5 ft 5 in)
F	15	(Australia)	Blicavs, Sara	1.89 m (6 ft 2 in)
F/C	25	(Australia)	Jackson, Lauren (injured)	1.96 m (6 ft 5 in)

Head coach

- (Australia) Cheryl Chambers

Assistant coach(es)

- (Australia) Belinda Snell
- (Australia) Kerryn Mitchell
- (Australia) Hannah Lowe

Legend

- (C) Team captain
- (DP) Development player
- (I) Import player
- Injured

- Roster
Updated: 17 March 2023

=== Sydney Flames ===
2022–23 Sydney Flames roster
Players
Coaches

Pos.	No.	Nat.	Name	Ht.
G	0	(Australia)	Bowyer, Indiah	1.71 m (5 ft 7 in)
G	5	(Australia)	Mangakahia, Tiana	1.68 m (5 ft 6 in)
F	7	(Australia)	Clarke, Emma	1.85 m (6 ft 1 in)
G	9	(Australia)	Panousis, Vanessa	1.70 m (5 ft 7 in)
F	10	(Australia)	Rowe, Kiera	1.80 m (5 ft 11 in)
G	11	(Australia)	Allen, Madelyn	1.70 m (5 ft 7 in)
G	12	(Australia)	Rotunno, Lilly	1.70 m (5 ft 7 in)
F	13	(United States)	Willoughby, Jocelyn	1.83 m (6 ft 0 in)
F	21	(Australia)	Froling, Keely	1.88 m (6 ft 2 in)
C	34	(United States)	Sjerven, Hannah	1.90 m (6 ft 3 in)

Head coach

- (Australia) Shelley Gorman

Legend

- (C) Team captain
- (DP) Development player
- (I) Import player
- Injured

- Roster
Updated: 14 October 2022

=== Townsville Fire ===
2022–23 Townsville Fire roster
Players
Coaches

Pos.	No.	Nat.	Name	Ht.
G	1	(Australia)	Nicholson, Lauren	1.80 m (5 ft 11 in)
G	3	(Australia)	Reid, Stephanie	1.68 m (5 ft 6 in)
G	4	(New Zealand)	Leger-Walker, Krystal	1.75 m (5 ft 9 in)
G/F	7	(Australia)	Woods, Courtney	1.83 m (6 ft 0 in)
G	9	(Australia)	Heal, Shyla	1.67 m (5 ft 6 in)
G	12	(Australia)	Gaze, Kate	1.73 m (5 ft 8 in)
F/C	14	(Australia)	McSpadden, Lara	1.94 m (6 ft 4 in)
C	15	(Australia)	Aokuso, Zitina	1.94 m (6 ft 4 in)
F	21	(United States)	Hawkins, Tianna	1.91 m (6 ft 3 in)
F	33	(United States)	Ruef, Mikaela	1.91 m (6 ft 3 in)
G	44	(United Kingdom)	Samuelson, Karlie	1.83 m (6 ft 0 in)

Head coach

- (Australia) Shannon Seebohm

Assistant coach(es)

- (Australia) Marcus Wong

Legend

- (C) Team captain
- (DP) Development player
- (I) Import player
- Injured

- Roster
Updated: 17 March 2023
