= List of 2021–22 WNBL team rosters =

2021–22 WNBL season
- League: Women's National Basketball League
- Sport: Basketball
- Teams: 8

WNBL seasons
- ← 2020 2022–23 →

Below is a list of team rosters as of the conclusion of the 2021–22 WNBL season.

== Rosters ==
=== Adelaide Lightning ===
2021–22 Adelaide Lightning roster
Players
Coaches

Pos.	No.	Nat.	Name	Ht.
G	3	(Australia)	Basham, Brooke	1.78 m (5 ft 10 in)
G/F	7	(Australia)	Talbot, Stephanie (C)	1.88 m (6 ft 2 in)
F/C	8	(Australia)	Brook, Chelsea	1.88 m (6 ft 2 in)
G	10	(Australia)	Ortlepp, Taylor	1.78 m (5 ft 10 in)
F	11	(Australia)	Smith, Alanna	1.91 m (6 ft 3 in)
G/F	12	(Australia)	Simons, Sam	1.88 m (6 ft 2 in)
G	13	(Australia)	Wehrung, Abigail	1.78 m (5 ft 10 in)
F/C	20	(Australia)	Batish, Ella	1.88 m (6 ft 2 in)
G/F	21	(Australia)	Whittle, Marena	1.80 m (5 ft 11 in)
G	23	(United States)	Williams, Kiana	1.73 m (5 ft 8 in)
C	24	(United States)	Shook, Kylee	1.96 m (6 ft 5 in)
G/F	41	(Australia)	Brazel, Tayla	1.82 m (6 ft 0 in)

Head coach

- (Australia) Chris Lucas

Assistant coach(es)

- (Australia) Natalie Hurst

Legend

- (C) Team captain
- (DP) Development player
- (I) Import player
- Injured

- Roster
Updated: 20 March 2022

=== Bendigo Spirit ===
2021–22 Bendigo Spirit roster
Players
Coaches

Pos.	No.	Nat.	Name	Ht.
F	2	(New Zealand)	Goulding, Mary	1.83 m (6 ft 0 in)
G	3	(Australia)	Garrick, Madeleine (C)	1.78 m (5 ft 10 in)
G	6	(Australia)	McLean, Cassidy	1.78 m (5 ft 10 in)
F	11	(Australia)	Goodchild, Alana	1.83 m (6 ft 0 in)
F/C	13	(Australia)	Rintala, Jennie	1.88 m (6 ft 2 in)
F	15	(Australia)	Maley, Anneli	1.88 m (6 ft 2 in)
F/C	16	(Australia)	Dunlop, Piper	1.88 m (6 ft 2 in)
G	22	(Australia)	Wilson, Alex	1.80 m (5 ft 11 in)
F	23	(Australia)	Skinner, Demi	1.90 m (6 ft 3 in)
G	24	(Australia)	Lavey, Tessa (C)	1.72 m (5 ft 8 in)
F/C	25	(Australia)	McKay, Megan	1.92 m (6 ft 4 in)
F	40	(Australia)	Boag, Carly	1.88 m (6 ft 2 in)

Head coach

- (Australia) Tracy York

Assistant coach(es)

- (Australia) Mark Alabakov
- (Australia) Mikaela Dombkins
- (Australia) Rebecca Dudic
- (Australia) Carly Stones

Legend

- (C) Team captain
- (DP) Development player
- (I) Import player
- Injured

- Roster
Updated: 20 March 2022

=== Canberra Capitals ===
2021–22 Canberra Capitals roster
Players
Coaches

Pos.	No.	Nat.	Name	Ht.
G	2	(United States)	Smart, Brittany	1.70 m (5 ft 7 in)
F/C	3	(United States)	Ruef, Mikaela	1.91 m (6 ft 3 in)
G	4	(Australia)	Tupaea, Tahlia	1.75 m (5 ft 9 in)
G	5	(Australia)	Melbourne, Jade	1.76 m (5 ft 9 in)
G/F	6	(Australia)	Swain, Shaneice	1.75 m (5 ft 9 in)
G	8	(Australia)	Cubillo, Abby	1.61 m (5 ft 3 in)
F	9	(Australia)	Froling, Alicia	1.90 m (6 ft 3 in)
G	20	(United States)	Sykes, Brittney	1.75 m (5 ft 9 in)
G	22	(Australia)	Wilson, Kelly	1.70 m (5 ft 7 in)
F	23	(Australia)	Griffin, Kelsey (C)	1.88 m (6 ft 2 in)
C	43	(Australia)	Bunton, Alex	1.96 m (6 ft 5 in)

Head coach

- (Australia) Paul Goriss

Assistant coach(es)

- (New Zealand) Kennedy Kereama
- (Australia) Carly Wilson

Legend

- (C) Team captain
- (DP) Development player
- (I) Import player
- Injured

- Roster
Updated: 26 November 2021

=== Melbourne Boomers ===
2021–22 Melbourne Boomers roster
Players
Coaches

Pos.	No.	Nat.	Name	Ht.
F	0	(Australia)	Ernst, Carley	1.96 m (6 ft 5 in)
G	6	(Australia)	Brewster, Rachel	1.80 m (5 ft 11 in)
F	7	(Australia)	Brown, Louise	1.90 m (6 ft 3 in)
G	8	(Australia)	Scanlon, Lily	1.75 m (5 ft 9 in)
G	9	(Australia)	Madgen, Tess	1.80 m (5 ft 11 in)
G	10	(Australia)	Wright, Izzy	1.80 m (5 ft 11 in)
F	12	(New Zealand)	Davidson, Penina	1.90 m (6 ft 3 in)
F	13	(Australia)	Magbegor, Ezi	1.93 m (6 ft 4 in)
G	15	(United States)	Allen, Lindsay	1.73 m (5 ft 8 in)
F/C	22	(Australia)	George, Cayla (C)	1.92 m (6 ft 4 in)
G	25	(United States)	Mitchell, Tiffany	1.75 m (5 ft 9 in)

Head coach

- (Australia) Guy Molloy

Assistant coach(es)

- (Australia) Larissa Anderson
- (Australia) Paul Flynn

Legend

- (C) Team captain
- (DP) Development player
- (I) Import player
- Injured

- Roster
Updated: 26 January 2022

=== Perth Lynx ===
2021–22 Perth Lynx roster
Players
Coaches

Pos.	No.	Nat.	Name	Ht.
G	0	(United States)	Young, Jackie	1.83 m (6 ft 0 in)
G	3	(United States)	Mabrey, Marina	1.80 m (5 ft 11 in)
F/C	5	(Australia)	Garbin, Darcee (C)	1.88 m (6 ft 2 in)
F	7	(Australia)	Clarke, Emma	1.85 m (6 ft 1 in)
G/F	8	(Australia)	Ciabattoni, Alex	1.83 m (6 ft 0 in)
G	9	(Australia)	Sharp, Alexandra	1.85 m (6 ft 1 in)
C	11	(Australia)	Scherf, Lauren	1.96 m (6 ft 5 in)
F/C	12	(Australia)	Clinch Hoycard, Mackenzie	1.90 m (6 ft 3 in)
F/C	20	(Australia)	Isenbarger, Ashleigh	1.87 m (6 ft 2 in)
G	22	(Australia)	Burrows, Tayah	1.79 m (5 ft 10 in)
G	31	(Australia)	Gandini, Emma	1.72 m (5 ft 8 in)
G	32	(Australia)	Whitcomb, Sami	1.78 m (5 ft 10 in)

Head coach

- (Australia) Ryan Petrik

Assistant coach(es)

- (Australia) Natalie Burton
- (Australia) Brad Robbins

Legend

- (C) Team captain
- (DP) Development player
- (I) Import player
- Injured

- Roster
Updated: 21 March 2022

=== Southside Flyers ===
2021–22 Southside Flyers roster
Players
Coaches

Pos.	No.	Nat.	Name	Ht.
G	1	(Australia)	Cole, Rebecca	1.78 m (5 ft 10 in)
G	2	(Australia)	Simmons, Taylah	1.78 m (5 ft 10 in)
G	3	(Australia)	Rocci, Aimie	1.78 m (5 ft 10 in)
G/F	4	(Australia)	O'Hea, Jenna (C)	1.87 m (6 ft 2 in)
G	5	(Australia)	Wallace, Kristy	1.80 m (5 ft 11 in)
G	9	(Australia)	Rocci, Maddison	1.68 m (5 ft 6 in)
F/C	10	(Australia)	Bishop, Abby	1.89 m (6 ft 2 in)
G	11	(Australia)	Gaze, Kate	1.78 m (5 ft 10 in)
F	12	(Australia)	Jarry, Rachel	1.85 m (6 ft 1 in)
F	15	(Australia)	Blicavs, Sara	1.89 m (6 ft 2 in)
F	22	(Australia)	Whittle-Harmon, Emilee	1.89 m (6 ft 2 in)

Head coach

- (Australia) Cheryl Chambers

Assistant coach(es)

- (Australia) Belinda Snell

Legend

- (C) Team captain
- (DP) Development player
- (I) Import player
- Injured

- Roster
Updated: 4 December 2021

=== Sydney Uni Flames ===
2021–22 Sydney Uni Flames roster
Players
Coaches

Pos.	No.	Nat.	Name	Ht.
G	2	(Australia)	Mahady, Emma	1.79 m (5 ft 10 in)
G	3	(Australia)	Nakkaşoğlu, Funda	1.73 m (5 ft 8 in)
G	4	(Australia)	Heal, Shyla	1.67 m (5 ft 6 in)
F	8	(Australia)	Pizzey, Rebecca	1.90 m (6 ft 3 in)
G	9	(Australia)	Deeble, Katie	1.72 m (5 ft 8 in)
F	10	(Australia)	Rowe, Kiera	1.80 m (5 ft 11 in)
F	12	(Australia)	Evans, Chyra	1.88 m (6 ft 2 in)
F	14	(United States)	Blazejewski, Maria	1.83 m (6 ft 0 in)
F	21	(Australia)	Froling, Keely (C)	1.88 m (6 ft 2 in)
G	24	(Australia)	Yaeger, Morgan	1.75 m (5 ft 9 in)
F	32	(New Zealand)	Purcell, Kalani	1.87 m (6 ft 2 in)
G	33	(Australia)	Mansfield, Lauren (injured) (C)	1.70 m (5 ft 7 in)

Head coach

- (Australia) Shane Heal

Assistant coach(es)

- (Australia) Shelley Gorman

Legend

- (C) Team captain
- (DP) Development player
- (I) Import player
- Injured

- Roster
Updated: 26 January 2022

=== Townsville Fire ===
2021–22 Townsville Fire roster
Players
Coaches

Pos.	No.	Nat.	Name	Ht.
G	0	(United States)	Sutton, Sug	1.73 m (5 ft 8 in)
G	1	(Australia)	Nicholson, Lauren (injured) (C)	1.80 m (5 ft 11 in)
G	3	(Australia)	Reid, Stephanie	1.68 m (5 ft 6 in)
G/F	7	(Australia)	Woods, Courtney	1.83 m (6 ft 0 in)
G	10	(Australia)	Murray, Mia (C)	1.85 m (6 ft 1 in)
F	12	(Australia)	Payne, Nadeen	1.88 m (6 ft 2 in)
F	14	(Australia)	McSpadden, Lara	1.94 m (6 ft 4 in)
C	15	(Australia)	Aokuso, Zitina	1.94 m (6 ft 4 in)
G	23	(Australia)	Fabbro, Aliza	1.72 m (5 ft 8 in)
F	24	(Australia)	Drennan, Carla	1.78 m (5 ft 10 in)
F	25	(United States)	Billings, Monique	1.91 m (6 ft 3 in)
G	32	(New Zealand)	Cocks, Micaela	1.75 m (5 ft 9 in)

Head coach

- (Australia) Shannon Seebohm

Assistant coach(es)

- (Australia) Tania Baxter
- (Australia) Luke Brennan
- (Australia) Mason Rogers

Legend

- (C) Team captain
- (DP) Development player
- (I) Import player
- Injured

- Roster
Updated: 20 March 2022
