= List of 2020 WNBL team rosters =

2020 WNBL season
- League: Women's National Basketball League
- Sport: Basketball
- Teams: 8

WNBL seasons
- ← 2019–20 2021–22 →

Below is a list of the rosters for the 2020 WNBL season.

== Rosters ==
=== Adelaide Lightning ===
2020 Adelaide Lightning roster
Players
Coaches

Pos.	No.	Nat.	Name	Ht.
C	2	(Australia)	Tomlinson, Louella	1.93 m (6 ft 4 in)
G	3	(Australia)	Basham, Brooke
G	4	(Australia)	Wilson, Alex	1.80 m (5 ft 11 in)
G	6	(Australia)	Smith, Carlie	1.85 m (6 ft 1 in)
G/F	7	(Australia)	Talbot, Stephanie (C)	1.88 m (6 ft 2 in)
F/C	8	(Australia)	Brook, Chelsea	1.88 m (6 ft 2 in)
G	9	(Australia)	Brett, Aimee	1.73 m (5 ft 8 in)
G	10	(Australia)	Ortlepp, Taylor	1.78 m (5 ft 10 in)
G	12	(Australia)	Yaeger, Morgan	1.75 m (5 ft 9 in)
G	13	(Australia)	Wehrung, Abigail	1.78 m (5 ft 10 in)
F/C	20	(Australia)	Batish, Ella	1.88 m (6 ft 2 in)
G/F	21	(Australia)	Whittle, Marena	1.80 m (5 ft 11 in)

Head coach

- (Australia) Chris Lucas

Assistant coach(es)

- (Australia) Natalie Hurst

Legend

- (C) Team captain
- (DP) Development player
- (I) Import player
- Injured

- Roster
Updated: 8 November 2020

=== Bendigo Spirit ===
2020 Bendigo Spirit roster
Players
Coaches

Pos.	No.	Nat.	Name	Ht.
F	2	(New Zealand)	Goulding, Mary	1.83 m (6 ft 0 in)
G	4	(Australia)	Todhunter, Amelia	1.69 m (5 ft 7 in)
G	5	(Australia)	Britten, Shelby	1.63 m (5 ft 4 in)
G	6	(Australia)	McLean, Cassidy	1.78 m (5 ft 10 in)
F	9	(Australia)	Froling, Alicia	1.90 m (6 ft 3 in)
G/F	15	(New Zealand)	Paalvast, Chevannah	1.80 m (5 ft 11 in)
F/C	16	(Australia)	Dunlop, Piper	1.88 m (6 ft 2 in)
F	18	(Australia)	Ernst, Carley	1.96 m (6 ft 5 in)
G	21	(Australia)	Price, Paige	1.88 m (6 ft 2 in)
F	23	(Australia)	Skinner, Demi	1.90 m (6 ft 3 in)
G	24	(Australia)	Lavey, Tessa (C)	1.72 m (5 ft 8 in)
F/C	31	(Australia)	Rintala, Jennie	1.88 m (6 ft 2 in)

Head coach

- (Australia) Tracy York

Assistant coach(es)

- (Australia) Mark Alabakov

Legend

- (C) Team captain
- (DP) Development player
- (I) Import player
- Injured

- Roster
Updated: 13 November 2020

=== Canberra Capitals ===
2020 Canberra Capitals roster
Players
Coaches

Pos.	No.	Nat.	Name	Ht.
F	1	(Australia)	Taia, Ashley	1.83 m (6 ft 0 in)
G	2	(United States)	Smart, Brittany	1.70 m (5 ft 7 in)
F/C	3	(United States)	Ruef, Mikaela	1.91 m (6 ft 3 in)
G	4	(Australia)	Tupaea, Tahlia	1.75 m (5 ft 9 in)
G	5	(Australia)	Melbourne, Jade	1.76 m (5 ft 9 in)
G/F	7	(Australia)	Kaser, Hannah	1.78 m (5 ft 10 in)
G	8	(Australia)	Cubillo, Abby	1.61 m (5 ft 3 in)
G	9	(Australia)	Rocci, Maddison	1.68 m (5 ft 6 in)
C	12	(Australia)	Tolo, Marianna (C)	1.96 m (6 ft 5 in)
F	14	(Australia)	Delaney, Alex	1.83 m (6 ft 0 in)
F	21	(Australia)	Froling, Keely	1.88 m (6 ft 2 in)
F	23	(Australia)	Griffin, Kelsey (C)	1.88 m (6 ft 2 in)

Head coach

- (Australia) Paul Goriss

Assistant coach(es)

- (Australia) Kristen Veal
- (Australia) Carly Wilson

Legend

- (C) Team captain
- (DP) Development player
- (I) Import player
- Injured

- Roster
Updated: 8 November 2020

=== Melbourne Boomers ===
2020 Melbourne Boomers roster
Players
Coaches

Pos.	No.	Nat.	Name	Ht.
G	4	(Australia)	Antoniadou, Rachel	1.75 m (5 ft 9 in)
G	6	(Australia)	Brewster, Rachel	1.80 m (5 ft 11 in)
G	7	(New Zealand)	Farnworth, Antonia	1.81 m (5 ft 11 in)
G	9	(Australia)	Madgen, Tess	1.80 m (5 ft 11 in)
G	10	(Australia)	Wright, Izzy	1.80 m (5 ft 11 in)
F	12	(New Zealand)	Davidson, Penina	1.90 m (6 ft 3 in)
F	13	(Australia)	Magbegor, Ezi	1.93 m (6 ft 4 in)
G	21	(New Zealand)	Beck, Stella	1.83 m (6 ft 0 in)
F/C	22	(Australia)	George, Cayla (C)	1.92 m (6 ft 4 in)
G	23	(Australia)	Garrick, Madeleine (C)	1.78 m (5 ft 10 in)
F	32	(New Zealand)	Purcell, Kalani	1.87 m (6 ft 2 in)
F	47	(New Zealand)	Karaitiana, Ashleigh	1.83 m (6 ft 0 in)

Head coach

- (Australia) Guy Molloy

Assistant coach(es)

- (Australia) Larissa Anderson
- (Australia) Paul Flynn

Legend

- (C) Team captain
- (DP) Development player
- (I) Import player
- Injured

- Roster
Updated: 8 November 2020

=== Perth Lynx ===
2020 Perth Lynx roster
Players
Coaches

Pos.	No.	Nat.	Name	Ht.
F	3	(Australia)	Williams, Nes'eya	1.86 m (6 ft 1 in)
F/C	5	(Australia)	Garbin, Darcee	1.88 m (6 ft 2 in)
G	6	(Australia)	Williams, Jewel	1.68 m (5 ft 6 in)
G/F	8	(Australia)	Ciabattoni, Alex	1.83 m (6 ft 0 in)
G	9	(Australia)	Sharp, Alexandra	1.85 m (6 ft 1 in)
G	10	(Australia)	Ebzery, Katie (C)	1.78 m (5 ft 10 in)
C	12	(Australia)	Edwards, Jessie	1.93 m (6 ft 4 in)
G	15	(Australia)	Burrows, Tayah	1.79 m (5 ft 10 in)
F/C	20	(Australia)	Isenbarger, Ashleigh	1.87 m (6 ft 2 in)
F	33	(United States)	Steindl, Kayla	1.87 m (6 ft 2 in)
F/C	35	(Australia)	Clinch Hoycard, Mackenzie	1.90 m (6 ft 3 in)
F	38	(Australia)	Clarke, Emma	1.85 m (6 ft 1 in)

Head coach

- (Australia) Ryan Petrik

Assistant coach(es)

- (Australia) Keegan Crawford

Legend

- (C) Team captain
- (DP) Development player
- (I) Import player
- Injured

- Roster
Updated: 8 November 2020

=== Southside Flyers ===
2020 Southside Flyers roster
Players
Coaches

Pos.	No.	Nat.	Name	Ht.
G	1	(Australia)	Cole, Rebecca	1.78 m (5 ft 10 in)
G	3	(Australia)	Clydesdale, Aimie	1.78 m (5 ft 10 in)
G/F	4	(Australia)	O'Hea, Jenna (C)	1.87 m (6 ft 2 in)
G	5	(Australia)	Mitchell, Leilani	1.65 m (5 ft 5 in)
F	6	(Australia)	Taylor, Saraid	1.72 m (5 ft 8 in)
G	7	(Australia)	Blicavs, Stephanie	1.78 m (5 ft 10 in)
C	8	(Australia)	Cambage, Liz	2.03 m (6 ft 8 in)
F	9	(Australia)	Pizzey, Rebecca	1.90 m (6 ft 3 in)
G	11	(Australia)	O'Neill, Amy	1.68 m (5 ft 6 in)
F	12	(Australia)	Jarry, Rachel	1.85 m (6 ft 1 in)
G	14	(Australia)	Conti, Monique	1.65 m (5 ft 5 in)
F	15	(Australia)	Blicavs, Sara	1.89 m (6 ft 2 in)
G	20	(Australia)	Giliam, Taylah	1.70 m (5 ft 7 in)

Head coach

- (Australia) Cheryl Chambers

Assistant coach(es)

- (Australia) Belinda Snell

Legend

- (C) Team captain
- (DP) Development player
- (I) Import player
- Injured

- Roster
Updated: 8 November 2020

=== Sydney Uni Flames ===
2020 Sydney Uni Flames roster
Players
Coaches

Pos.	No.	Nat.	Name	Ht.
G	3	(Turkey)	Nakkaşoğlu, Funda	1.73 m (5 ft 8 in)
G	7	(Australia)	Calleia, Sherrie
F	8	(Australia)	Rowe, Kiera	1.80 m (5 ft 11 in)
C	9	(Australia)	Burton, Natalie	1.94 m (6 ft 4 in)
F	10	(Australia)	Greaves, Shanae	1.85 m (6 ft 1 in)
C	11	(Australia)	Scherf, Lauren	1.96 m (6 ft 5 in)
F	12	(Australia)	Boag, Christina	1.88 m (6 ft 2 in)
F	14	(Australia)	Norris, Madeleine
G	22	(Australia)	O'Hehir, Madeleine	1.79 m (5 ft 10 in)
F	24	(Australia)	Maley, Anneli	1.88 m (6 ft 2 in)
G/F	32	(United States)	Schwagmeyer, Alison (C)	1.77 m (5 ft 10 in)
G	33	(Australia)	Mansfield, Lauren (C)	1.70 m (5 ft 7 in)
F	40	(Australia)	Boag, Carly	1.88 m (6 ft 2 in)

Head coach

- (Australia) Katrina Hibbert

Assistant coach(es)

- (United States) Courtney Belger

Legend

- (C) Team captain
- (DP) Development player
- (I) Import player
- Injured

- Roster
Updated: 15 November 2020

=== Townsville Fire ===
2020 Townsville Fire roster
Players
Coaches

Pos.	No.	Nat.	Name	Ht.
G	1	(Australia)	Nicholson, Lauren	1.80 m (5 ft 11 in)
G	3	(Australia)	Reid, Stephanie	1.68 m (5 ft 6 in)
G	4	(Australia)	Heal, Shyla	1.67 m (5 ft 6 in)
G/F	7	(Australia)	Woods, Courtney	1.83 m (6 ft 0 in)
G	10	(Australia)	Murray, Mia	1.85 m (6 ft 1 in)
G	11	(Australia)	Gaze, Kate	1.78 m (5 ft 10 in)
F	12	(Australia)	Payne, Nadeen	1.88 m (6 ft 2 in)
F	14	(Australia)	McSpadden, Lara	1.94 m (6 ft 4 in)
C	15	(Australia)	Aokuso, Zitina	1.94 m (6 ft 4 in)
G	23	(Australia)	Fabbro, Aliza	1.72 m (5 ft 8 in)
F/C	25	(Australia)	McKay, Megan	1.92 m (6 ft 4 in)

Head coach

- (Australia) Shannon Seebohm

Assistant coach(es)

- (Australia) Luke Brennan

Legend

- (C) Team captain
- (DP) Development player
- (I) Import player
- Injured

- Roster
Updated: 15 November 2020
