= List of 2023–24 WNBL team rosters =

2023–24 WNBL season
- League: Women's National Basketball League
- Sport: Basketball
- Teams: 8

WNBL seasons
- ← 2022–23 2024–25 →

Below is a list of the rosters as they currently stand for the upcoming 2023–24 WNBL season.

== Rosters ==
=== Adelaide Lightning ===
2022–23 Adelaide Lightning roster
Players
Coaches

Pos.	No.	Nat.	Name	Ht.
G	3	(Australia)	Basham, Brooke	1.78 m (5 ft 10 in)
G	4	(Australia)	Tonks, Elizabeth	1.72 m (5 ft 8 in)
G/F	7	(Australia)	Talbot, Stephanie (injured)	1.88 m (6 ft 2 in)
F	11	(Australia)	Mole, Taylor	1.88 m (6 ft 2 in)
F	13	(United States)	Willoughby, Jocelyn	1.83 m (6 ft 0 in)
G	14	(Australia)	Borlase, Isobel	1.78 m (5 ft 10 in)
F	20	(Australia)	Batish, Ella	1.88 m (6 ft 2 in)
F	21	(United States)	Turner, Brianna	1.91 m (6 ft 3 in)
G	33	(Australia)	Mansfield, Lauren	1.70 m (5 ft 7 in)
G	34	(Australia)	Bourne, Isabelle	1.70 m (5 ft 7 in)
G/F	41	(Australia)	Brazel, Tayla	1.82 m (6 ft 0 in)

Head coach

- (Australia) Natalie Hurst

Assistant coach(es)

- (Australia) Matthew Clarke
- (Australia) Melissa Downer

Legend

- (C) Team captain
- (DP) Development player
- (I) Import player
- Injured

- Roster
Updated: 4 November 2023

=== Bendigo Spirit ===
2023–24 Bendigo Spirit roster
Players
Coaches

Pos.	No.	Nat.	Name	Ht.
F	3	(New Zealand)	McGoldrick, Esra	1.88 m (6 ft 2 in)
G	4	(Australia)	Wilson, Alex	1.80 m (5 ft 11 in)
F	8	(Australia)	Locandro, Sophia	1.90 m (6 ft 3 in)
F	9	(Australia)	Froling, Alicia	1.90 m (6 ft 3 in)
G	12	(United States)	Kraker, Mehryn	1.83 m (6 ft 0 in)
G	13	(Australia)	Wehrung, Abigail	1.78 m (5 ft 10 in)
G	16	(Australia)	Samuels, Casey	1.82 m (6 ft 0 in)
G	22	(Australia)	Wilson, Kelly	1.70 m (5 ft 7 in)
F	23	(Australia)	Griffin, Kelsey (C)	1.88 m (6 ft 2 in)
C	44	(Canada)	Davis, Ruth	1.98 m (6 ft 6 in)

Head coach

- (New Zealand) Kennedy Kereama

Assistant coach(es)

- (Australia) Deanna Black

Legend

- (C) Team captain
- (DP) Development player
- (I) Import player
- Injured

- Roster
Updated: 4 November 2023

=== Canberra Capitals ===
2023–24 Canberra Capitals roster
Players
Coaches

Pos.	No.	Nat.	Name	Ht.
G	5	(Australia)	Melbourne, Jade (C)	1.76 m (5 ft 9 in)
G/F	7	(Australia)	Kirisome, Jade	1.75 m (5 ft 9 in)
F/C	8	(Australia)	Pizzey, Rebecca (injured)	1.90 m (6 ft 3 in)
G	9	(Australia)	Sharp, Alexandra (C)	1.85 m (6 ft 1 in)
G	10	(Australia)	Potter, Gemma	1.82 m (6 ft 0 in)
G/F	11	(Australia)	Reilly, Shakera	1.79 m (5 ft 10 in)
F	12	(Australia)	Fowler, Alex	1.88 m (6 ft 2 in)
G/F	13	(Australia)	Tugliach, Chloe (injured)	1.79 m (5 ft 10 in)
G	19	(Australia)	Clark, Jayda	1.83 m (6 ft 0 in)
F	33	(United States)	Munger, Nicole	1.80 m (5 ft 11 in)
C	43	(Australia)	Bunton, Alex	1.96 m (6 ft 5 in)
F	99	(Japan)	Okoye, Monica	1.83 m (6 ft 0 in)

Head coach

- (Australia) Kristen Veal

Assistant coach(es)

- (Australia) Paul Goriss
- (Australia) Aidan Barnett

Legend

- (C) Team captain
- (DP) Development player
- (I) Import player
- Injured

- Roster
Updated: 19 November 2023

=== Melbourne Boomers ===
2023–24 Melbourne Boomers roster
Players
Coaches

Pos.	No.	Nat.	Name	Ht.
G	0	(United States)	Canada, Jordin	1.68 m (5 ft 6 in)
G	3	(Australia)	Wallace, Kristy (C)	1.80 m (5 ft 11 in)
G	4	(Australia)	Calleia, Sherrie	1.72 m (5 ft 8 in)
F	6	(Australia)	Simmons, Taylah	1.85 m (6 ft 1 in)
F	7	(United States)	Hillmon, Naz	1.88 m (6 ft 2 in)
G	11	(New Zealand)	Reed, Tera	1.89 m (6 ft 2 in)
F	12	(New Zealand)	Davidson, Penina	1.90 m (6 ft 3 in)
G	14	(Australia)	Conti, Monique	1.65 m (5 ft 5 in)
F	21	(Australia)	Froling, Keely (C)	1.88 m (6 ft 2 in)
G	22	(Australia)	Rocci, Aimie	1.78 m (5 ft 10 in)
F	46	(Australia)	Blicavs, Sara	1.89 m (6 ft 2 in)

Head coach

- (Australia) Chris Lucas

Assistant coach(es)

- (Australia) Kristi Harrower

Legend

- (C) Team captain
- (DP) Development player
- (I) Import player
- Injured

- Roster
Updated: 19 November 2023

=== Perth Lynx ===
2023–24 Perth Lynx roster
Players
Coaches

Pos.	No.	Nat.	Name	Ht.
G	1	(Australia)	Miela Goodchild	1.80 m (5 ft 11 in)
G	2	(Australia)	Gorman, Stephanie	1.83 m (6 ft 0 in)
G	3	(United States)	McDonald, Aari	1.68 m (5 ft 6 in)
F/C	5	(Australia)	Hannan, Ashlee	1.92 m (6 ft 4 in)
G	6	(Australia)	Forster, Chloe	1.76 m (5 ft 9 in)
G	8	(Australia)	Ciabattoni, Alex	1.80 m (5 ft 11 in)
C	10	(Canada)	Potter, Emily	1.95 m (6 ft 5 in)
F	12	(Australia)	Clinch Hoycard, Mackenzie	1.91 m (6 ft 3 in)
F	24	(Australia)	Maley, Anneli (C)	1.85 m (6 ft 1 in)
G	25	(Australia)	Atwell, Amy	1.83 m (6 ft 0 in)

Head coach

- (Australia) Ryan Petrik

Assistant coach(es)

- (Australia) Natalie Burton
- (Australia) Brad Robbins

Legend

- (C) Team captain
- (DP) Development player
- (I) Import player
- Injured

- Roster
Updated: 4 November 2023

=== Southside Flyers ===
2023–24 Southside Flyers roster
Players
Coaches

Pos.	No.	Nat.	Name	Ht.
G	1	(Australia)	Cole, Rebecca (C)	1.78 m (5 ft 10 in)
F	4	(Australia)	Brown, Louise	1.90 m (6 ft 3 in)
G	5	(Australia)	Mitchell, Leilani	1.65 m (5 ft 5 in)
G	7	(Australia)	Loughridge, Dallas	1.67 m (5 ft 6 in)
G	9	(Australia)	Rocci, Maddison	1.68 m (5 ft 6 in)
F	11	(Australia)	Ernst, Carley	1.96 m (6 ft 5 in)
F	12	(Australia)	Wischer, Klara	1.90 m (6 ft 3 in)
F	13	(Australia)	Puoch, Nyadiew	1.86 m (6 ft 1 in)
F/C	15	(Australia)	Jackson, Lauren	1.96 m (6 ft 5 in)
G	20	(United States)	Dickey, Jasmine	1.75 m (5 ft 9 in)
C	21	(United States)	Russell, Mercedes	1.98 m (6 ft 6 in)

Head coach

- (Australia) Cheryl Chambers

Assistant coach(es)

- (Australia) Kerryn Mitchell
- (Australia) Hannah Lowe

Legend

- (C) Team captain
- (DP) Development player
- (I) Import player
- Injured

- Roster
Updated: 4 November 2023

=== Sydney Flames ===
2023–24 Sydney Flames roster
Players
Coaches

Pos.	No.	Nat.	Name	Ht.
G	1	(Australia)	Nicholson, Lauren (C)	1.83 m (6 ft 0 in)
G/F	2	(United States)	Richards, DiDi	1.88 m (6 ft 2 in)
G	3	(Australia)	Hurst, Ahlise	1.75 m (5 ft 9 in)
G	5	(Australia)	Panousis, Vanessa	1.70 m (5 ft 7 in)
G	6	(Australia)	Swain, Shaneice (injured)	1.75 m (5 ft 9 in)
F	7	(Australia)	Clarke, Emma	1.85 m (6 ft 1 in)
G	9	(Australia)	Madgen, Tess	1.80 m (5 ft 11 in)
F	10	(Australia)	Rowe, Kiera	1.80 m (5 ft 11 in)
C	12	(Australia)	Juffermans, Isla	1.94 m (6 ft 4 in)
F/C	13	(Australia)	George, Cayla	1.92 m (6 ft 4 in)
C	14	(Australia)	McSpadden, Lara	1.94 m (6 ft 4 in)
G	22	(United States)	Bradley, Paige	1.78 m (5 ft 10 in)

Head coach

- (Australia) Guy Molloy

Assistant coach(es)

- (Australia) Renae Garlepp
- (Australia) Tiana Mangakahia

Legend

- (C) Team captain
- (DP) Development player
- (I) Import player
- Injured

- Roster
Updated: 4 November 2023

=== Townsville Fire ===
2023–24 Townsville Fire roster
Players
Coaches

Pos.	No.	Nat.	Name	Ht.
G	0	(Australia)	Bowyer, Indiah	1.73 m (5 ft 8 in)
F	1	(Australia)	Kunek, Alice (injured)	1.88 m (6 ft 2 in)
G	2	(Australia)	Shiels, Saffron	1.88 m (6 ft 2 in)
G	3	(Australia)	Reid, Stephanie	1.68 m (5 ft 6 in)
G	6	(Australia)	McDowell-White, Jessica	1.68 m (5 ft 6 in)
G/F	7	(Australia)	Woods, Courtney	1.83 m (6 ft 0 in)
C	14	(Australia)	Tofaeono, Ella	1.90 m (6 ft 3 in)
C	15	(Australia)	Aokuso, Zitina	1.94 m (6 ft 4 in)
G	17	(Australia)	Whitcomb, Sami (C)	1.78 m (5 ft 10 in)
F	21	(Canada)	Brown, Cassandra	1.88 m (6 ft 2 in)
F	33	(United States)	Ruef, Mikaela	1.91 m (6 ft 3 in)
C	42	(Sweden)	Zahui B., Amanda	1.93 m (6 ft 4 in)

Head coach

- (Australia) Shannon Seebohm

Assistant coach(es)

- (Australia) Marcus Wong

Legend

- (C) Team captain
- (DP) Development player
- (I) Import player
- Injured

- Roster
Updated: 21 December 2023
