= List of 2024–25 WNBL team rosters =

2024–25 WNBL season
- League: Women's National Basketball League
- Sport: Basketball
- Teams: 8

WNBL seasons
- ← 2023–24 2025–26 →

Below is a list of the rosters as they currently stand for the upcoming 2024–25 WNBL season.

== Rosters ==
=== Adelaide Lightning ===
2024–25 Adelaide Lightning roster
Players
Coaches

Pos.	No.	Nat.	Name	Ht.
G	3	(Australia)	Basham, Brooke	1.72 m (5 ft 8 in)
F	5	(Australia)	Pineau, Georgia	1.85 m (6 ft 1 in)
G/F	7	(Australia)	Talbot, Stephanie (C)	1.88 m (6 ft 2 in)
F	9	(Australia)	Simons, Jess (DP)	1.78 m (5 ft 10 in)
F	10	(Australia)	Freer, Maddy	1.80 m (5 ft 11 in)
G	14	(Australia)	Borlase, Isobel	1.80 m (5 ft 11 in)
G/F	15	(Australia)	Thompson, Krystal (DP)	1.75 m (5 ft 9 in)
F	18	(Australia)	Gordon, Ella	1.84 m (6 ft 0 in)
G	19	(Australia)	Andrews, Haylee	1.78 m (5 ft 10 in)
F	21	(United States)	Turner, Brianna (I)	1.91 m (6 ft 3 in)
F	22	(Australia)	Graham, Grace	1.84 m (6 ft 0 in)
G	24	(United States)	Dean, Japreece (I)	1.70 m (5 ft 7 in)
F	34	(Australia)	Bourne, Isabelle	1.88 m (6 ft 2 in)
G/F	41	(Australia)	Brazel, Tayla (injured)	1.82 m (6 ft 0 in)

Head coach

- (Australia) Scott Ninnis

Assistant coach(es)

- (Australia) Matthew Clarke

Legend

- (C) Team captain
- (DP) Development player
- (I) Import player
- Injured

- Roster
Updated: 12 January 2025

=== Bendigo Spirit ===
2024–25 Bendigo Spirit roster
Players
Coaches

Pos.	No.	Nat.	Name	Ht.
F/C	0	(Australia)	Hannan, Ashlee	1.92 m (6 ft 4 in)
F	3	(Australia)	Bird, Opal	1.89 m (6 ft 2 in)
G	5	(Australia)	Simpson, Micah	1.70 m (5 ft 7 in)
G	6	(United States)	Burton, Veronica (I)	1.75 m (5 ft 9 in)
F	10	(Australia)	Nightingale, Asha (DP)	1.87 m (6 ft 2 in)
C	12	(Australia)	Tolo, Marianna	1.95 m (6 ft 5 in)
G	13	(Australia)	Wehrung, Abigail	1.78 m (5 ft 10 in)
G	14	(Australia)	Booth, Georgia (DP)	1.75 m (5 ft 9 in)
G	16	(Australia)	Samuels, Casey	1.82 m (6 ft 0 in)
G	22	(Australia)	Wilson, Kelly	1.70 m (5 ft 7 in)
F	23	(Australia)	Griffin, Kelsey (C)	1.88 m (6 ft 2 in)
G	32	(Australia)	Whitcomb, Sami	1.78 m (5 ft 10 in)

Head coach

- (New Zealand) Kennedy Kereama

Assistant coach(es)

- (Australia) Deanna Black
- (Australia) Mat Holmes
- (Australia) Andrea Walsh
- (Australia) John White

Legend

- (C) Team captain
- (DP) Development player
- (I) Import player
- Injured

- Roster
Updated: 12 January 2025

=== Canberra Capitals ===
2024–25 Canberra Capitals roster
Players
Coaches

Pos.	No.	Nat.	Name	Ht.
F	0	(Australia)	Horvat, Chantel	1.87 m (6 ft 2 in)
G	1	(Australia)	Bowyer, Indiah	1.78 m (5 ft 10 in)
G	4	(Australia)	Deeble, Katie	1.73 m (5 ft 8 in)
G	5	(Australia)	Melbourne, Jade (C)	1.78 m (5 ft 10 in)
G	9	(Australia)	Bobongie, Monique	1.78 m (5 ft 10 in)
F	10	(United States)	Munger, Nicole (I)	1.80 m (5 ft 11 in)
F/C	12	(Australia)	Jefferson, Meg (injured)	1.85 m (6 ft 1 in)
F	13	(Australia)	Puoch, Nyadiew	1.90 m (6 ft 3 in)
G	21	(Australia)	Clark, Jayda (injured)	1.83 m (6 ft 0 in)
C	35	(United States)	Collier, Charli (I)	1.95 m (6 ft 5 in)
F/C	41	(New Zealand)	Tofaeono, Ella	1.90 m (6 ft 3 in)
F/C	66	(Australia)	Bishop, Abby (NRP)	1.89 m (6 ft 2 in)

Head coach

- (Australia) Paul Goriss

Assistant coach(es)

- (Australia) Carly Wilson
- (Australia) Mel Downer
- (Australia) Aidan Wightman

Legend

- (C) Team captain
- (DP) Development player
- (I) Import player
- (NRP) Nominated replacement player
- Injured

- Roster
Updated: 12 January 2025

=== Geelong United ===
2024–25 Geelong United roster
Players
Coaches

Pos.	No.	Nat.	Name	Ht.
G/F	1	(Australia)	Crichton, Dakota (DP)	1.85 m (6 ft 1 in)
F	2	(Australia)	Knight, Tanielle (DP)	1.85 m (6 ft 1 in)
G	3	(Australia)	Sharp, Alexandra (NRP)	1.82 m (6 ft 0 in)
G	4	(Australia)	Shelley, Jaz	1.75 m (5 ft 9 in)
G	5	(Australia)	Brett, Elissa	1.83 m (6 ft 0 in)
G	7	(Australia)	Elsworthy, Sarah	1.71 m (5 ft 7 in)
G	10	(Australia)	Potter, Gemma	1.82 m (6 ft 0 in)
G	11	(Australia)	Mole, Taylor	1.88 m (6 ft 2 in)
F/C	12	(Australia)	Hank, Hannah	1.88 m (6 ft 2 in)
G/F	13	(United States)	Jones, Haley (I)	1.85 m (6 ft 1 in)
G	14	(Australia)	Conti, Monique	1.65 m (5 ft 5 in)
F	21	(Australia)	Froling, Keely (C)	1.88 m (6 ft 2 in)
F	55	(Israel)	Raber, Daniel (I)	1.80 m (5 ft 11 in)

Head coach

- (Australia) Chris Lucas

Assistant coach(es)

- (Australia) Hannah Lowe

Legend

- (C) Team captain
- (DP) Development player
- (I) Import player
- (NRP) Nominated replacement player
- Injured

- Roster
Updated: 12 January 2025

=== Perth Lynx ===
2024–25 Perth Lynx roster
Players
Coaches

Pos.	No.	Nat.	Name	Ht.
G	1	(Australia)	Goodchild, Miela	1.80 m (5 ft 11 in)
G	2	(Australia)	Gorman, Stephanie	1.83 m (6 ft 0 in)
F/C	3	(United States)	Morrell, Teige (I)	1.90 m (6 ft 3 in)
G	5	(Australia)	Wilson, Alex	1.80 m (5 ft 11 in)
G	8	(Australia)	Ciabattoni, Alex	1.80 m (5 ft 11 in)
F	9	(Australia)	Waite, Kiara	1.90 m (6 ft 3 in)
F	12	(Australia)	Clinch Hoycard, Mackenzie	1.91 m (6 ft 3 in)
F	15	(Canada)	Amihere, Laeticia (I)	1.91 m (6 ft 3 in)
G	21	(Australia)	Scafidi, Jaya (DP)	1.72 m (5 ft 8 in)
F	24	(Australia)	Maley, Anneli (C)	1.85 m (6 ft 1 in)
G	25	(Australia)	Atwell, Amy (C)	1.83 m (6 ft 0 in)
G	42	(Australia)	Fotu, Alira (DP)	1.68 m (5 ft 6 in)

Head coach

- (Australia) Ryan Petrik

Assistant coach(es)

- (Australia) Mike Malat

Legend

- (C) Team captain
- (DP) Development player
- (I) Import player
- Injured

- Roster
Updated: 3 November 2024

=== Southside Flyers ===
2024–25 Southside Flyers roster
Players
Coaches

Pos.	No.	Nat.	Name	Ht.
F	00	(United States)	Hillmon, Naz	1.88 m (6 ft 2 in)
G	1	(Australia)	Cole, Rebecca (C)	1.78 m (5 ft 10 in)
G	7	(Australia)	Loughridge, Dallas	1.67 m (5 ft 6 in)
G	9	(Australia)	Rocci, Maddison	1.68 m (5 ft 6 in)
F	10	(Australia)	Kunek, Alice	1.88 m (6 ft 2 in)
F	11	(Australia)	Ernst, Carley	1.96 m (6 ft 5 in)
G	14	(Australia)	Burrows, Tayah	1.79 m (5 ft 10 in)
F	17	(United States)	Vaughn, Mikayla	1.92 m (6 ft 4 in)
G/F	24	(New Zealand)	Reed, Tera	1.83 m (6 ft 0 in)
F	32	(Australia)	Puoch, Manuela	1.87 m (6 ft 2 in)

Head coach

- (Australia) Kristi Harrower

Assistant coach(es)

- (Australia) Jo Wood

Legend

- (C) Team captain
- (DP) Development player
- (I) Import player
- Injured

- Roster
Updated: 3 November 2024

=== Sydney Flames ===
2024–25 Sydney Flames roster
Players
Coaches

Pos.	No.	Nat.	Name	Ht.
G	0	(United States)	Taylor, Celeste	1.80 m (5 ft 11 in)
F/C	3	(United States)	Ruef, Mikaela	1.91 m (6 ft 3 in)
G	4	(Australia)	Pitman, Carla	1.80 m (5 ft 11 in)
G	6	(Australia)	Swain, Shaneice	1.75 m (5 ft 9 in)
F	7	(Australia)	Clarke, Emma	1.85 m (6 ft 1 in)
G	11	(Australia)	Calleia, Sherrie	1.73 m (5 ft 8 in)
F/C	13	(Australia)	George, Cayla (C)	1.92 m (6 ft 4 in)
C	20	(United States)	Morris, Yemiyah	1.98 m (6 ft 6 in)
G	22	(Australia)	Deas, Bonnie	1.75 m (5 ft 9 in)
G	24	(Australia)	Brancatisano, Isabella	1.78 m (5 ft 10 in)

Head coach

- (Australia) Guy Molloy

Assistant coach(es)

- (Australia) Renae Garlepp
- (Australia) Tiana Mangakahia

Legend

- (C) Team captain
- (DP) Development player
- (I) Import player
- Injured

- Roster
Updated: 3 November 2024

=== Townsville Fire ===
2024–25 Townsville Fire roster
Players
Coaches

Pos.	No.	Nat.	Name	Ht.
G	1	(South Sudan)	Lok, Nyaduoth	1.80 m (5 ft 11 in)
G	2	(Australia)	Shiels, Saffron	1.88 m (6 ft 2 in)
G/F	7	(Australia)	Woods, Courtney (C)	1.83 m (6 ft 0 in)
F	9	(Australia)	Froling, Alicia (C)	1.90 m (6 ft 3 in)
G	11	(United States)	Coffey, Nia	1.85 m (6 ft 1 in)
F	12	(Australia)	Fowler, Alex	1.88 m (6 ft 2 in)
F	15	(United States)	Cox, Lauren	1.93 m (6 ft 4 in)
G	23	(Australia)	Ellis, Abbey	1.68 m (5 ft 6 in)
F	30	(Australia)	Cochrane, Lucy	1.98 m (6 ft 6 in)
G	33	(Australia)	Mansfield, Lauren (C)	1.70 m (5 ft 7 in)

Head coach

- (Australia) Shannon Seebohm

Assistant coach(es)

- (Australia) Marcus Wong

Legend

- (C) Team captain
- (DP) Development player
- (I) Import player
- Injured

- Roster
Updated: 15 March 2025
