= List of 2025–26 WNBL team rosters =

2025–26 WNBL season
- League: Women's National Basketball League
- Sport: Basketball
- Teams: 8

WNBL seasons
- ← 2024–25 2026–27 →

This article features each team roster for the 2025–26 WNBL season. This list was last updated as of 26 October 2025.

== Rosters ==
=== Adelaide Lightning ===
2025–26 Adelaide Lightning roster
Players
Coaches

Pos.	No.	Nat.	Name	Ht.
F/C	1	(New Zealand)	Tofaeono, Ella	1.90 m (6 ft 3 in)
F	2	(United States)	Sundell, Serena (I)	1.85 m (6 ft 1 in)
G	4	(Australia)	Loughridge, Dallas	1.67 m (5 ft 6 in)
G	6	(Australia)	Porter, Ruby (DP)	1.78 m (5 ft 10 in)
G/F	7	(Australia)	Talbot, Stephanie (C)	1.88 m (6 ft 2 in)
F	10	(Australia)	Freer, Maddy	1.80 m (5 ft 11 in)
F	11	(New Zealand)	Robati, Sharne	1.80 m (5 ft 11 in)
F	13	(Australia)	Freer, Jordyn (DP)	1.80 m (5 ft 11 in)
G	15	(Australia)	Fejo, Jasmine	1.77 m (5 ft 10 in)
F/C	20	(United States)	Feagin, Sania (I)	1.91 m (6 ft 3 in)
F	31	(New Zealand)	Strawbridge, Ashlee	1.85 m (6 ft 1 in)
G/F	41	(Australia)	Brazel, Tayla	1.82 m (6 ft 0 in)

Head coach

- (Australia) Kerryn Mitchell

Assistant coach(es)

- (Australia) Cherie Cordoba
- (Australia) Georgia Crouch

Legend

- (C) Team captain
- (DP) Development player
- (I) Import player
- Injured

- Roster
Updated: 26 October 2025

=== Bendigo Spirit ===
2025–26 Bendigo Spirit roster
Players
Coaches

Pos.	No.	Nat.	Name	Ht.
F	0	(Australia)	McDowell-White, Hayley (DP)	1.89 m (6 ft 2 in)
G	3	(Australia)	Booth, Georgia	1.75 m (5 ft 9 in)
G	4	(United States)	McConnell, Megan (I)	1.70 m (5 ft 7 in)
G	5	(Australia)	Simpson, Micah	1.70 m (5 ft 7 in)
F	7	(Australia)	Pollerd, Olivia	1.91 m (6 ft 3 in)
F	8	(Australia)	Macgregor, Catherine (DP)	1.80 m (5 ft 11 in)
C	12	(Australia)	Tolo, Marianna (C)	1.95 m (6 ft 5 in)
G	13	(Australia)	Wehrung, Abigail	1.78 m (5 ft 10 in)
G	14	(Australia)	Borlase, Isobel	1.80 m (5 ft 11 in)
G	16	(Australia)	Samuels, Casey	1.82 m (6 ft 0 in)
F	23	(Australia)	Griffin, Kelsey (C)	1.88 m (6 ft 2 in)
F	53	(Australia)	Rees, Kelsey	1.95 m (6 ft 5 in)

Head coach

- (New Zealand) Kennedy Kereama

Assistant coach(es)

- (Australia) Brayden Heslehurst
- (Australia) John White

Legend

- (C) Team captain
- (DP) Development player
- (I) Import player
- Injured

- Roster
Updated: 26 October 2025

=== Canberra Capitals ===
2025–26 Canberra Capitals roster
Players
Coaches

Pos.	No.	Nat.	Name	Ht.
F/C	3	(United States)	Morrell, Teige	1.90 m (6 ft 3 in)
G	4	(Australia)	Hayward, Sharn (DP)	1.65 m (5 ft 5 in)
G	5	(Australia)	Melbourne, Jade (C)	1.78 m (5 ft 10 in)
G	7	(Australia)	Solway, Abby (DP)	1.62 m (5 ft 4 in)
F	8	(Australia)	Russell, Zara (DP)	1.85 m (6 ft 1 in)
G	9	(Australia)	Bobongie, Monique	1.78 m (5 ft 10 in)
F	10	(United States)	Munger, Nicole (I)	1.80 m (5 ft 11 in)
F	13	(Australia)	Puoch, Nyadiew	1.90 m (6 ft 3 in)
F/C	15	(Australia)	Aokuso, Zitina (injured)	1.93 m (6 ft 4 in)
G	21	(Australia)	Clark, Jayda	1.83 m (6 ft 0 in)
G	24	(Australia)	Brancatisano, Isabella	1.78 m (5 ft 10 in)
F	30	(France)	Sissoko, Kadi (I)	1.88 m (6 ft 2 in)
F	46	(Australia)	Blicavs, Sara (C)	1.88 m (6 ft 2 in)

Head coach

- (Australia) Paul Goriss

Assistant coach(es)

- (Australia) Natalie Hurst
- (Australia) Tracey Wightman

Legend

- (C) Team captain
- (DP) Development player
- (I) Import player
- (NRP) Nominated replacement player
- Injured

- Roster
Updated: 26 October 2025

=== Geelong Venom ===
2025–26 Geelong Venom roster
Players
Coaches

Pos.	No.	Nat.	Name	Ht.
G	1	(Australia)	Dimarco, Tayli (DP)	1.68 m (5 ft 6 in)
G	2	(Australia)	Rotunno, Lilly	1.71 m (5 ft 7 in)
G	3	(Australia)	Stevens, Poppy (DP)	1.72 m (5 ft 8 in)
G	4	(Australia)	Shelley, Jaz (C)	1.75 m (5 ft 9 in)
G	5	(Australia)	Brett, Elissa	1.83 m (6 ft 0 in)
G	7	(Australia)	Taylor, Georgia	1.77 m (5 ft 10 in)
G	9	(Australia)	Sharp, Alexandra (C)	1.82 m (6 ft 0 in)
G	10	(Australia)	Potter, Gemma	1.82 m (6 ft 0 in)
G	11	(Australia)	Mole, Taylor	1.88 m (6 ft 2 in)
F	12	(Australia)	Clinch Hoycard, Mackenzie	1.91 m (6 ft 3 in)
G	23	(Australia)	Heal, Shyla (injured)	1.68 m (5 ft 6 in)
F	35	(United States)	Pili, Alissa (injured) (I)	1.80 m (5 ft 11 in)
F	54	(United States)	Holmes, Mackenzie (I)	1.91 m (6 ft 3 in)

Head coach

- (Australia) Chris Lucas

Assistant coach(es)

- (United Kingdom) Megan Moody
- (Australia) Kaleb Sclater

Legend

- (C) Team captain
- (DP) Development player
- (I) Import player
- (NRP) Nominated replacement player
- Injured

- Roster
Updated: 26 October 2025

=== Perth Lynx ===
2025–26 Perth Lynx roster
Players
Coaches

Pos.	No.	Nat.	Name	Ht.
G	2	(Australia)	Gorman, Stephanie	1.83 m (6 ft 0 in)
G	3	(Australia)	Weir, Kyana (DP)	1.70 m (5 ft 7 in)
G	5	(Australia)	Wilson, Alex	1.80 m (5 ft 11 in)
G	8	(Australia)	Ciabattoni, Alex	1.80 m (5 ft 11 in)
F	9	(Australia)	Waite, Kiara	1.90 m (6 ft 3 in)
G	10	(New Zealand)	Graham, Tegan	1.77 m (5 ft 10 in)
F	11	(United States)	Turner, Brianna (I)	1.91 m (6 ft 3 in)
C	12	(Australia)	Gayo, Kuir (DP)	1.88 m (6 ft 2 in)
C	20	(United States)	Morris, Yemiyah (I)	1.98 m (6 ft 6 in)
G	21	(Australia)	Scafidi, Jaya (DP)	1.72 m (5 ft 8 in)
F	24	(Australia)	Maley, Anneli (C)	1.85 m (6 ft 1 in)
G	25	(Australia)	Atwell, Amy (C)	1.83 m (6 ft 0 in)
G	42	(Australia)	Fotu, Alira	1.68 m (5 ft 6 in)

Head coach

- (Australia) Ryan Petrik

Assistant coach(es)

- (Australia) Andrew Cooper
- (United States) Devondrick Walker

Legend

- (C) Team captain
- (DP) Development player
- (I) Import player
- Injured

- Roster
Updated: 26 October 2025

=== Southside Melbourne Flyers ===
2025–26 Southside Melbourne Flyers roster
Players
Coaches

Pos.	No.	Nat.	Name	Ht.
G	0	(Australia)	Bowyer, Indiah	1.78 m (5 ft 10 in)
F/C	3	(Australia)	George, Cayla (C)	1.92 m (6 ft 4 in)
G	6	(Australia)	Young, Nikita	1.78 m (5 ft 10 in)
G	9	(Australia)	Rocci, Maddison	1.68 m (5 ft 6 in)
G	10	(Australia)	Andrews, Haylee	1.78 m (5 ft 10 in)
F	11	(Australia)	Ernst, Carley	1.96 m (6 ft 5 in)
G	17	(Australia)	Rock, Imogen (DP)	1.78 m (5 ft 10 in)
G	20	(United States)	Marisa, Makenna (I)	1.80 m (5 ft 11 in)
G	22	(South Sudan)	Lok, Nyaduoth	1.80 m (5 ft 11 in)
G/F	29	(New Zealand)	Reed, Tera	1.83 m (6 ft 0 in)
F	32	(Australia)	Puoch, Manuela	1.87 m (6 ft 2 in)
F	34	(Australia)	Bourne, Isabelle	1.88 m (6 ft 2 in)
F	99	(United States)	Peters, Haley (I)	1.91 m (6 ft 3 in)

Head coach

- (Australia) Kristi Harrower

Assistant coach(es)

- (Australia) Matthew Clarke
- (Australia) Jo Wood

Legend

- (C) Team captain
- (DP) Development player
- (I) Import player
- Injured

- Roster
Updated: 26 October 2025

=== Sydney Flames ===
2025–26 Sydney Flames roster
Players
Coaches

Pos.	No.	Nat.	Name	Ht.
G	0	(France)	Époupa, Olivia (I)	1.65 m (5 ft 5 in)
G	1	(Australia)	Nicholson, Lauren (C)	1.83 m (6 ft 0 in)
F	2	(Australia)	Morgan, Isabelle (DP)	1.78 m (5 ft 10 in)
G	3	(Australia)	Cann, Mikhaela	1.73 m (5 ft 8 in)
G	4	(Australia)	Pitman, Carla	1.80 m (5 ft 11 in)
G	6	(Australia)	Swain, Shaneice	1.75 m (5 ft 9 in)
G	11	(Australia)	Emma-Nnopu, Agnes	1.80 m (5 ft 11 in)
G	12	(Australia)	Martin, Caitlyn (DP)	1.62 m (5 ft 4 in)
F	14	(Australia)	McSpadden, Lara	1.93 m (6 ft 4 in)
F	21	(Australia)	Froling, Keely	1.88 m (6 ft 2 in)
G	22	(Australia)	Perkins, Ruby (DP)	1.73 m (5 ft 8 in)
F	30	(Australia)	Norris, Madeleine	1.88 m (6 ft 2 in)
F	52	(United States)	Thompson, Unique (I)	1.90 m (6 ft 3 in)

Head coach

- (Australia) Guy Molloy

Assistant coach(es)

- (Australia) Renae Garlepp

Legend

- (C) Team captain
- (DP) Development player
- (I) Import player
- Injured

- Roster
Updated: 26 October 2025

=== Townsville Fire ===
2025–26 Townsville Fire roster
Players
Coaches

Pos.	No.	Nat.	Name	Ht.
F	0	(Australia)	Horvat, Chantel (IRP)	1.87 m (6 ft 2 in)
G	1	(Australia)	Sowah, Miela	1.80 m (5 ft 11 in)
G	2	(Australia)	Shiels, Saffron (injured)	1.88 m (6 ft 2 in)
G/F	7	(Australia)	Woods, Courtney (C)	1.83 m (6 ft 0 in)
F	9	(Australia)	Froling, Alicia (C)	1.90 m (6 ft 3 in)
G	11	(Australia)	Forster, Chloe	1.78 m (5 ft 10 in)
F	12	(Australia)	Fowler, Alexandra	1.88 m (6 ft 2 in)
F	15	(United States)	Cox, Lauren (I)	1.93 m (6 ft 4 in)
G/F	16	(Australia)	Crichton, Dakota	1.85 m (6 ft 1 in)
F	21	(Australia)	Anderson, Piper (DP)	1.87 m (6 ft 2 in)
G	23	(Australia)	Ellis, Abbey	1.68 m (5 ft 6 in)
F	25	(Australia)	Van Es, Caitlyn (DP)	1.90 m (6 ft 3 in)
F	33	(United States)	Olsen, Lucy (I)	1.78 m (5 ft 10 in)

Head coach

- (Australia) Shannon Seebohm

Assistant coach(es)

- (Australia) Miles Bench
- (Australia) Marcus Wong

Legend

- (C) Team captain
- (DP) Development player
- (I) Import player
- (IRP) Injury replacement player
- Injured

- Roster
Updated: 26 October 2025
