= Izzy Wright =

Australian basketball player

No. 10 – Melbourne Boomers
- Position: Guard
- League: Women's National Basketball League

Personal information
- Born: 9 November 1990 (age 36) Tweed Heads, New South Wales
- Listed height: 5 ft 11 in (1.80 m)

Career information
- High school: Hillcrest (Gold Coast, Queensland)
- College: Pensacola (2008–2010); San Diego (2010–2012)
- WNBA draft: 2012: undrafted
- Playing career: 2012–present

Career history
- 2012–2013: Logan Thunder
- 2013–2016: Hobart Chargers
- 2015–2016: Perth Lynx
- 2018–2019: Nunawading Spectres
- 2020–present: Melbourne Boomers

Eliza "Izzy" Wright (née Chilcott; born 9 November 1990) is an Australian professional basketball player.

== College ==
Upon finishing high school at Hillcrest Christian College, Wright began her college career at Pensacola Junior College in Pensacola, Florida, playing for the Pirates in the NJCAA's Region 8. After two seasons with Pensacola, Wright then went on and transferred to the University of San Diego in San Diego, California, playing with the Toreros in the West Coast Conference of NCAA Division I.

=== Statistics ===
Year	Team	GP	GS	MPG	FG%	3P%	FT%	RPG	APG	SPG	BPG	TO	PPG
2008–09	Pensacola	23	–	–	.557	.333	.903	1.6	1.6	1.6	0.1	1.1	5.9
2009–10	Pensacola	28	–	–	.483	.311	.760	2.9	1.7	1.4	0.0	1.3	10.2
2010–11	San Diego	31	5	–	.370	.333	.777	2.6	0.8	0.6	0.3	1.3	2.4
2011–12	San Diego	35	33	–	.437	.250	.714	6.4	2.0	1.8	0.2	2.0	6.6
Career		117	38	–	.463	.298	.776	3.6	1.5	1.3	0.1	1.5	6.2

== Career ==
=== WNBL ===
In 2012, Wright began her professional career, joining her hometown side, Logan Thunder for the 2012–13 season.

In 2015, after strong showings with the Hobart Chargers in the SEABL, Wright was picked up by the newly rebranded Perth Lynx for 2015–16. This season saw Wright make her WNBL Finals debut, with a trip to the Grand Final, where the Lynx went down 0–2 to Townsville. Wright played in 26 games on the 2015–16 season, averaging 2.2 points and 1.9 rebounds per game.

In 2020, Wright returned to the WNBL after several years away from the league, signing with the Melbourne Boomers for the 2020 season.

In April 2022, Wright was part of the Melbourne Boomers championship team and was voted the Boomers Player's Player of the Year
