= Taylor Ortlepp =

Australian basketball player (born 1997)

- Born: 22 June 1997 (age 29)
- Height: 180 cm (5 ft 11 in)
- Basketball career

Career information
- High school: Saint Ignatius' College (Adelaide, South Australia)
- College: Boston (2016–2020)
- WNBA draft: 2020: undrafted
- Playing career: 2014–present
- Position: Guard

Career history
- 2014–2016: Norwood Flames
- 2015–2016: Adelaide Lightning
- 2020–2022: Adelaide Lightning
- 2021: North Adelaide Rockets
- 2022: Rockingham Flames
- 2023: Melbourne Boomers
- 2023: Melbourne Tigers

Career highlights
- Premier League champion (2015)
Australian rules football career
Personal information
- Debut: Round 6, 2022 (S7), Carlton vs. Greater Western Sydney, at Henson Park
- Position: Utility
Playing career^{1}
Years	Club	Games (Goals)
2022 (S7)–2024	Carlton	13 (1)
- ^{1} Playing statistics correct to the end of the 2024 season.

Taylor Jae Ortlepp (born 22 June 1997) is an Australian professional basketball player and Australian rules footballer. She has played for the Adelaide Lightning and Melbourne Boomers in the Women's National Basketball League (WNBL) and Carlton in the AFL Women's (AFLW).

== Early life ==
Ortlepp grew up playing basketball in country South Australia before moving to Adelaide as an U16, where she played the rest of her junior career with Norwood Basketball Club and attended Saint Ignatius' College.

== Basketball career ==
=== Early years ===
Ortlepp played three seasons in the South Australian Premier League for the Norwood Flames between 2014 and 2016. She also spent the 2014–15 WNBL season with the Adelaide Lightning.

=== College ===
Between 2016 and 2020, Ortlepp played college basketball in the United States for the Boston College Eagles.

=== Professional ===
In 2020, Ortlepp played for the Adelaide Lightning in the WNBL Hub season. After a season with the North Adelaide Rockets in the NBL1 Central, she returned to the Lightning for the 2021–22 WNBL season. She then joined the Rockingham Flames for the 2022 NBL1 West season.

On 28 January 2023, Ortlepp signed with the Melbourne Boomers for the rest of the 2022–23 WNBL season. She then played for the Melbourne Tigers in the 2023 NBL1 South season.

=== National team ===
Ortlepp first represented Australia in 2013 at the FIBA Oceania Under-16 Championship in Melbourne. She would then go on to represent Australia at the 2014 FIBA Under-17 World Championship in the Czech Republic, where they finished in fifth place, with a 6–1 record.

== Football career ==
Ortlepp signed for Carlton in the AFLW ahead of 2022 season 7. In three seasons on the list, she played 13 games for the club. She was delisted at the end of the 2024 season.

== Personal life ==
Ortlepp is the daughter of Julie and Grant, and has a brother, Cameron.
