= Jennie Rintala =

American basketball player

Personal information
- Born: 10 July 1990 (age 36) Osseo, Minnesota
- Listed height: 6 ft 2 in (1.88 m)

Career information
- High school: Osseo (Osseo, Minnesota)
- College: South Dakota State (2008–2012)
- WNBA draft: 2012: undrafted
- Playing career: 2013–present
- Position: Forward

Career history
- 2013–2014: Kalamunda Eastern Suns
- 2015: Rhein-Main Baskets
- 2017–2019: Kalamunda Eastern Suns
- 2018: Résidence Walferdange
- 2019: Adelaide Lightning
- 2020; 2022: Bendigo Spirit
- 2021–2022: West Adelaide Bearcats
- 2023–2024: Diamond Valley Eagles
- 2025: Bulleen Boomers
- 2026: McKinnon Cougars

Career highlights
- 2× Big V champion (2025, 2026); NBL1 Central champion (2022); All-Summit (2011, 2012); Summit Tournament MVP (2012); SBL All Star (2017, 2018); Northwest Suburban Conference 4AAAA Regional Champs (2007 - 2008)

Jennie Rintala (née Sunnarborg; born 10 July 1990) is an American-Australian professional basketball player.

== College ==
Rintala played college basketball at South Dakota State University in Brookings, South Dakota, playing with the Jackrabbits in the Summit League of NCAA Division I. Rintala (nee Sunnarborg) is a 4 time (2009-2012) Summit League Tournament Champion and has 4 NCAA D1 Tournament Appearances (2009-2012)

=== Statistics ===
Year	Team	GP	GS	MPG	FG%	3P%	FT%	RPG	APG	SPG	BPG	TO	PPG
2008–09	South Dakota State	24	0	8.7	.429	.000	.706	1.9	0.1	0.2	0.5	0.8	3.3
2009–10	South Dakota State	33	13	16.5	.455	.385	.759	4.1	0.5	0.3	1.2	2.0	7.6
2010–11	South Dakota State	33	33	24.0	.509	.222	.684	4.3	1.4	0.9	1.3	2.8	13.0
2011–12	South Dakota State	33	33	25.5	.439	.389	.806	6.2	1.5	0.9	0.4	2.0	14.4
Career		123	79	19.4	.467	.331	.753	4.3	1.0	0.6	0.9	2.0	10.0

== Career ==
=== Australia ===
In 2013, Rintala was signed by the Kalamunda Eastern Suns to play in Western Australia's State Basketball League. She had a very successful debut in the SBL, leading the Suns to their first grand final and taking home the club MVP award for the 2013 season. Rintala would remain with the Suns for the 2014 season.

In 2017, Rintala played a third season with the Suns. She went on to spend the 2017–18 WNBL season training with the Perth Lynx. She continued on with the Suns in 2018 and 2019.

In October 2019, Rintala signed with the Adelaide Lightning for the start of the 2019–20 WNBL season as a replacement for injured import Crystal Langhorne. Rintala played five games for the Lightning between 18 October and 22 November.

In September 2020, Rintala signed with the Bendigo Spirit for the 2020 WNBL Hub season in Queensland. She joined the team as a local after becoming a naturalised Australian. In 13 games, she averaged 4.4 points and 3.2 rebounds per game.

Rintala joined the West Adelaide Bearcats of the NBL1 Central for the 2021 season.

In February 2022, Rintala re-joined the Spirit for the rest of the 2021–22 WNBL season. She then re-joined the Bearcats for the 2022 NBL1 Central season and helped the team win the championship.

Rintala joined the Diamond Valley Eagles of the NBL1 South for the 2023 season. She returned to the Eagles for the 2024 season.

Rintala joined the Bulleen Boomers of the Big V for the 2025 season. She helped the Boomers win the Big V championship. In 16 games, she averaged 15.94 points and 9.13 rebounds per game.

In 2026, Rintala won another Big V championship, this time with the McKinnon Cougars.

=== Europe ===
In January 2015, Rintala joined Rhein-Main Baskets if the German DBBL. She left the team after playing six games for the team.

In January 2018, Rintala joined Résidence Walferdange in Luxembourg, competing in the Nationale 1 league. In 10 games, she averaged 18.6 points, 12.1 rebounds, 2.2 assists and 1.4 steals per game.
