= Alexandra Bunton =

Australian basketball player

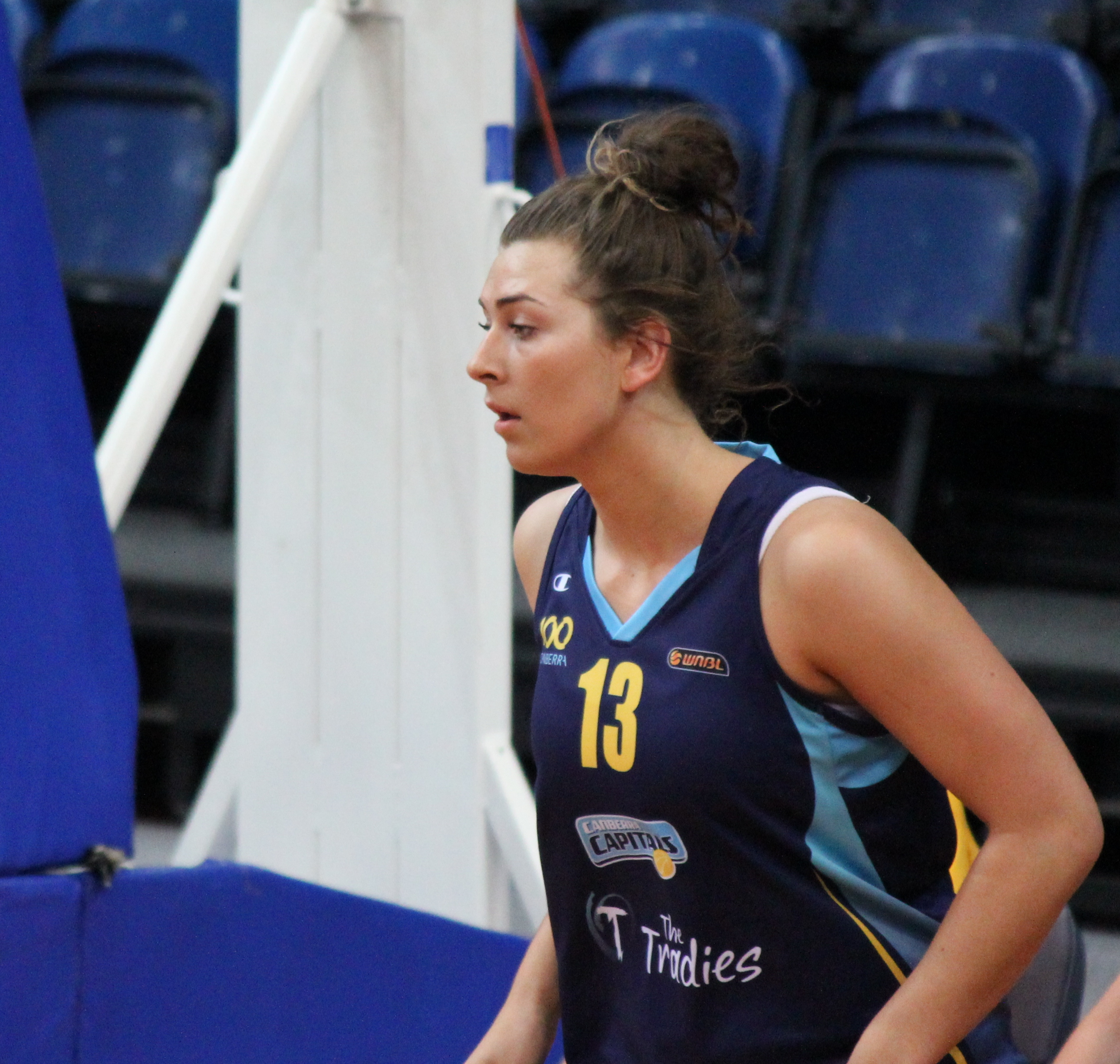

No. 42 – Dynamo Moscow
- Position: Forward / Centre
- League: WBPL

Personal information
- Born: 13 October 1993 (age 33) Lincoln, England
- Listed height: 6 ft 5 in (1.96 m)

Career information
- High school: Lake Ginninderra (Canberra, ACT)
- WNBA draft: 2015: undrafted
- Playing career: 2009–present

Career history
- 2009–2012: Australian Institute of Sport
- 2012–2014: Canberra Capitals
- 2014–2015: Adelaide Lightning
- 2015–2016: Dandenong Rangers
- 2016–present: Dynamo Moscow
Medals
Women's basketball
Representing Australia
FIBA World Cup
| Silver medal – second place | 2018 Spain |

Alexandra Caitlin Bunton (born 13 October 1993) is an Australian professional basketball player.

== Career ==
=== WNBL ===
Bunton began her professional career in 2009, for the Australian Institute of Sport. After the AIS, Bunton was signed by her home town side, Canberra Capitals. After spending two seasons under Carrie Graf alongside the likes of Lauren Jackson, Bunton signed with the Adelaide Lightning in 2014. After a year in Adelaide, she then signed with the Dandenong Rangers for the 2015–16 season.

=== Europe ===
In 2016, Bunton was signed by Dynamo Moscow to play in the 2016–17 season of the Russian Premier League and the Eastern European Basketball Women's League.

== National team ==
=== Youth Level ===
Bunton made her international debut for the Sapphires at the 2010 Under-17 World Championship in France, where Australia placed 7th. Bunton would then represent the Gems at the 2011 Under-19 World Championship in Chile the following year, where they finished in fourth place and narrowly missed out on a medal. She also represented Australia at the 2015 Summer Universiade in Gwangju, South Korea, where they placed 5th.
