= Casey Samuels =

Australian basketball player

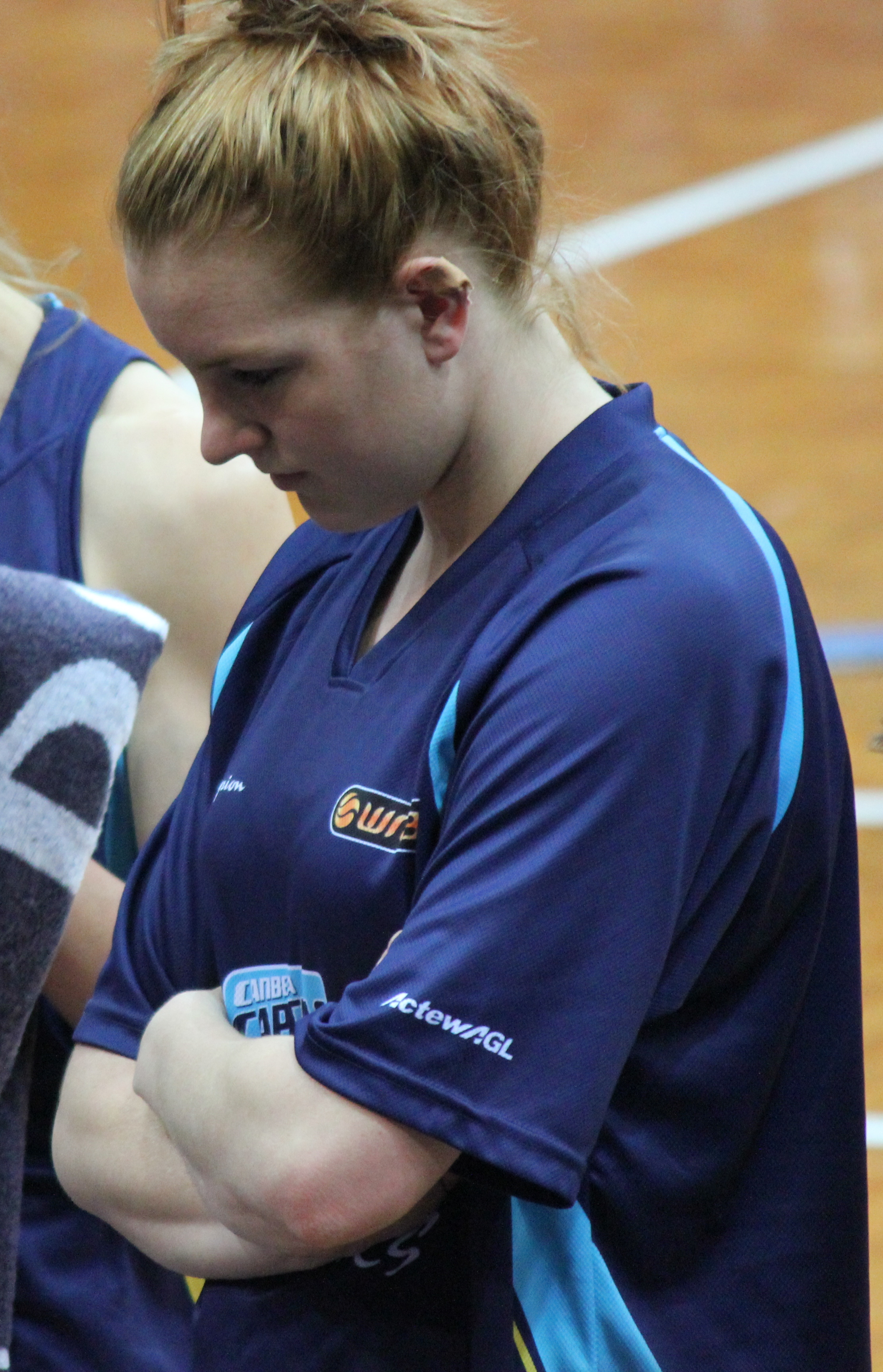
- Samuels with the Canberra Capitals in 2012

No. 16 – Bendigo Spirit
- Position: Guard / Forward
- League: WNBL

Personal information
- Born: 2 August 1994 (age 32) Westmead, New South Wales, Australia
- Listed height: 183 cm (6 ft 0 in)

Career information
- Playing career: 2010–present

Career history
- 2010–2012: Australian Institute of Sport
- 2012–2013: Canberra Capitals
- 2013: Hills Hornets
- 2013–2016: Sydney Uni Flames
- 2015; 2017: Bankstown Bruins
- 2018–2019: North Gold Coast Seahawks
- 2018–2019: Townsville Fire
- 2021: Gold Coast Rollers
- 2021–2022: Canberra Capitals
- 2022: Central Districts Lions
- 2022–2023: ARMS Depiro Rabat Imtarfa
- 2023: Rockingham Flames
- 2023–present: Bendigo Spirit
- 2024: Central Districts Lions
- 2025–: Bendigo Braves

Career highlights
- WNBL champion (2025); NBL1 Central champion (2024); Waratah League champion (2015); NBL1 Central MVP (2024); NBL1 Central All-Star Five (2024)

Casey Jo Samuels (born 2 August 1994) is an Australian professional basketball player for the Bendigo Spirit of the Women's National Basketball League (WNBL). She is also contracted with the Bendigo Braves of the NBL1 South.

== Early life ==
Samuels was born in Westmead, New South Wales.

== Basketball career ==
=== WNBL ===
Samuels debuted in the Women's National Basketball League (WNBL) for the Australian Institute of Sport in 2010. She played two seasons for the AIS. In a 14 December 2011 game against the Canberra Capitals, she was the team's leading scorer with 19 points. In a January 2012 game against the Dandenong Rangers, she scored five points in game her team lost. She was the team's second leading scorer in the game. In an 8 February 2012 game against the Capitals, she scored 10 points in the second half. She finished the game as the team's third leading scorer with eleven points.

For the 2012–13 WNBL season, Samuels joined the Canberra Capitals. Between 2013 and 2016, she played three seasons for the Sydney Uni Flames. Her next WNBL stint came in 2018–19 with the Townsville Fire. This was followed by a return to the Capitals in 2021–22.

In July 2023, Samuels signed with the Bendigo Spirit for the 2023–24 WNBL season. She re-signed with the Spirit for two more seasons in July 2024. She helped the Spirit win the 2024–25 WNBL championship.

=== State Leagues ===
In 2013, Samuels played for the Hills Hornets in the Waratah League. In 2015 and 2017, she played in the Waratah League for the Bankstown Bruins. She then played for the North Gold Coast Seahawks in the Queensland Basketball League in 2018 and 2019 and then for the Gold Coast Rollers in the NBL1 North in 2021.

In 2022, Samuels played for the Central Districts Lions in the NBL1 Central. She played for the Rockingham Flames of the NBL1 West in 2023 and then returned to the Lions for the 2024 NBL1 Central season. She was named NBL1 Central MVP in 2024.

Samuels is set to join the Bendigo Braves of the NBL1 South for the 2025 season.

=== Europe ===
For the 2022–23 season, Samuels joined ARMS Depiro Rabat Imtarfa in Malta, where she led the league in scoring with 23 points per game.
