= Megan McKay =

Australian basketball player

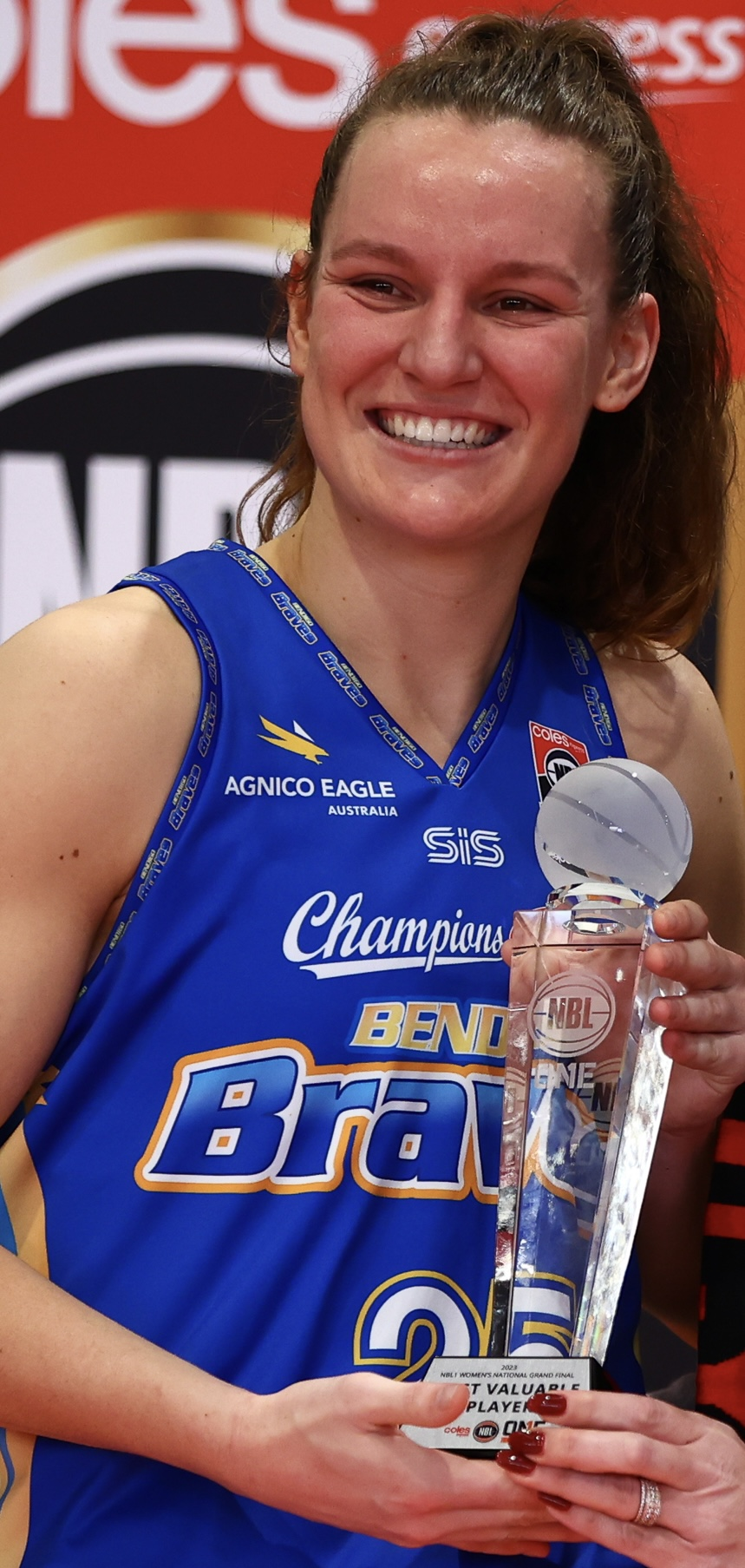
- McKay with the Bendigo Braves in 2023

Perry Lakes Hawks
- Position: Power forward / center
- League: NBL1 West

Personal information
- Born: 8 January 1997 (age 29) Katanning, Western Australia, Australia
- Listed height: 194 cm (6 ft 4 in)

Career information
- High school: St Mary's (Perth, Western Australia)
- College: Saint Mary's (2015–2019)
- WNBA draft: 2019: undrafted
- Playing career: 2013–present

Career history
- 2013–2015: Perry Lakes Hawks
- 2019: Perry Lakes Hawks
- 2019–2020: TSV 1880 Wasserburg
- 2020: Townsville Fire
- 2021: Perry Lakes Hawks
- 2021–2023: Bendigo Spirit
- 2022–2024: Bendigo Braves
- 2024: Melbourne Boomers
- 2025–present: Perry Lakes Hawks

Career highlights
- NBL1 National champion (2023); NBL1 National Finals Championship Game MVP (2023); 2× NBL1 National Finals All-Star Five (2023, 2024); NBL1 South champion (2023); NBL1 South MVP (2023); NBL1 South All-Star Five (2023); 2× First-team All-WCC (2018, 2019)
Medals
Basketball
Representing Australia
Summer Universiade
Gold medal – first place	2017 Taiwan	Team

Megan Ann McKay (born 8 January 1997) is an Australian professional basketball player.

== Early life and career ==
McKay was born and raised in Katanning, Western Australia. She attended St Mary's Anglican Girls' School in Perth.

McKay played for the Perry Lakes Hawks of the State Basketball League (SBL) in 2013, 2014 and 2015.

== College career ==
McKay played four years of college basketball in the United States for the Saint Mary's Gaels between 2015 and 2019. She earned first-team All-West Coast Conference in 2017–18 and 2018–19.

=== Statistics ===
Ratios
Year	Team	GP	FG%	3P%	FT%	RBG	APG	BPG	SPG	PPG
2015-16	Saint Mary's	32	61.9%	–	62.9%	5.91	0.50	0.66	0.38	7.38
2016-17	Saint Mary's	33	55.7%	–	63.2%	7.85	1.33	0.61	0.97	10.67
2017-18	Saint Mary's	30	60.8%	–	69.9%	7.33	0.67	0.43	0.73	15.33
2018-19	Saint Mary's	33	58.2%	29.4%	67.6%	7.85	1.09	0.55	0.21	12.64
Career		128	58.9%	26.3%	66.7%	7.24	0.91	0.56	0.57	11.45

Totals
Year	Team	GP	FG	FGA	3P	3PA	FT	FTA	REB	A	BK	ST	PTS
2015-16	Saint Mary's	32	96	155	0	1	44	70	189	16	21	12	236
2016-17	Saint Mary's	33	146	262	0	1	60	95	259	44	20	32	352
2017-18	Saint Mary's	30	180	296	0	0	100	143	220	20	13	22	460
2018-19	Saint Mary's	33	159	273	5	17	94	139	259	36	18	7	417
Career		128	581	986	5	19	298	447	927	116	72	73	1465

== Professional career ==
Coming out of college, McKay returned to the Perry Lakes Hawks for the 2019 State Basketball League season.

For the 2019–20 season, McKay joined TSV 1880 Wasserburg of the Damen-Basketball-Bundesliga. In 21 games, she averaged 16.2 points and 8.0 rebounds per game.

McKay joined the Townsville Fire for the 2020 WNBL Hub season in Queensland.

McKay re-joined the Perry Lakes Hawks for the 2021 NBL1 West season.

McKay joined the Bendigo Spirit for the 2021–22 WNBL season. She then played for the Bendigo Braves of the NBL1 South during the 2022 NBL1 season and then re-joined the Spirit for the 2022–23 WNBL season.

With the Braves in the 2023 season, McKay earned NBL1 South MVP and NBL1 South All-Star Five. She helped the Braves win the NBL1 South championship and the NBL1 National championship. She was subsequently named NBL1 National Finals Championship Game MVP and NBL1 National Finals All-Star Five.

On 19 January 2024, McKay signed with the Melbourne Boomers for the rest of the 2023–24 WNBL season as an injury replacement for Penina Davidson.

McKay re-joined the Braves for the 2024 NBL1 South season. She stepped away from the team mid season to take a break from basketball for personal reasons. She returned to the squad for the 2024 NBL1 National Finals, where she helped the team reach the championship game and earned All-Star Five honours.

On 21 May 2025, McKay signed with the Perry Lakes Hawks for the rest of the 2025 NBL1 West season.

== National team ==
McKay played for Australia at the 2013 FIBA Oceania Under-16 Championship in Melbourne, where Australia took home the gold. She played for the Australian University National Team in 2017 at the World University Games in Taipei.
