= Shaneice Swain =

Australian basketball player (born 2003)

No. 6 – Sydney Flames
- Position: Guard
- League: WNBL

Personal information
- Born: 5 October 2003 (age 23) Cairns, Queensland, Australia
- Listed height: 5 ft 9 in (1.75 m)

Career information
- High school: Cairns State (Cairns, Queensland)
- WNBA draft: 2023: 2nd round, 14th overall pick
- Drafted by: Los Angeles Sparks
- Playing career: 2023–present

Career history
- 2021–22: University of Canberra Capitals
- 2022–23: Mackay Meteorettes
- 2023–present: Sydney Flames

Career highlights
- NBL1 South Youth Player of the Year (2024); Nike Hoop Summit (2023)
- Stats at WNBA.com
- Stats at Basketball Reference
Medals
Women's basketball
Representing Australia
FIBA Under-19 Women's Basketball World Cup
Silver medal – second place	2019 Thailand U19

Shaneice Swain (born 15 October 2003) is an Australian basketball player for the Sydney Flames of the WNBL league in Australia. She also plays basketball for the Australian women's national basketball team and signed with the Los Angeles Sparks of the American WNBA for the 2025 season.

== Early life ==
Swain was born in Cairns, Queensland, to her father Norman and her mother. She has two brothers and a sister. She is Aboriginal Australian of Goreng Goreng, Yupanguthi, and Gangalidda descent.

Swain began playing basketball at age 5, and often she stayed out late playing with her brothers and father in her backyard. She attended and played basketball at Cairns State High School.

== Professional career ==
Prior to her WNBA draft, she played at both the Cairns Dolphins and the Mackay Meteorettes of the NBL1 North league in Australia. Swain played for the University of Canberra Capitals from 2021 to 2022. In the 2023 season, she started in 13 games and averaged 14.5 points, 3.4 rebounds, and 2.1 assists. She had a 40.9% shot rate from the field, 36.2% from the three-point line, and 63% from the free-throw line. She was recognised as "Captain on the Rise" at a Capitals awards ceremony in 2023 for her stellar stats line. As of March 2023, Swain had scored 261 points, 37 assists, and 35 steals for the Caps. In the 2022–23 season, Swain ranked fourth in the WNBL for steals per game and top 15 for three-pointers.

Swain was drafted in round 2, as the 14th overall pick of the 2023 WNBA draft to the Los Angeles Sparks. She was the only Australian to be drafted in the 2023 WNBA draft.

Due to an injury, Swain was out for most of the 2023 season. She spent the 2024 season with the Sydney Flames of the Women's National Basketball League in Sydney, Australia.

She then transferred to Geelong United of the NBL1 South league in the 2024 season. Her new head coach, Jamie Petty, compliments her "passing, scoring, and on ball defence".

After not playing in the WNBA in 2024, Swain signed with the Los Angeles Sparks on February 5, 2025.
