= Lara McSpadden =

Australian basketball player

No. 14 – Sydney Flames
- Position: Center
- League: WNBL

Personal information
- Born: 2 April 1999 (age 27) Penrith, New South Wales, Australia
- Listed height: 6 ft 4 in (1.93 m)

Career information
- Playing career: 2015–present

Career history
- 2015: Newcastle Hunters
- 2016: BA Centre of Excellence
- 2016–2020: Sydney Uni Flames
- 2017–2018: Sydney Sparks
- 2019–2020: Newcastle Hunters
- 2020–2023: Townsville Fire
- 2021–2024: Rockhampton Cyclones
- 2023–2024: Sydney Flames
- 2024: Tauranga Whai
- 2025: BK Lokomotiva Trutnov
- 2025: Diamond Valley Eagles
- 2025–present: Sydney Flames
- 2026–present: Keilor Thunder

Career highlights
- 2× WNBL champion (2017, 2023); TBA champion (2024); NBL1 North champion (2024); Waratah League champion (2019)
Medals
Representing Australia
Women's basketball
FIBA U17 World Championship
Gold medal – first place	2016 Spain	Team
FIBA Oceania U16 Championship
Gold medal – first place	2015 New Zealand	Team
Women's 3x3 basketball
Asia Cup
Gold medal – first place	2026 Singapore	Team
Commonwealth Games
Gold medal – first place	2026 Glasgow	Team

Lara Gweneth McSpadden (born 2 April 1999) is an Australian professional basketball player.

== Early life ==
McSpadden was born in Penrith, New South Wales.

== Professional career ==
=== WNBL ===
McSpadden began her professional career with the Sydney Uni Flames in the 2016–17 WNBL season. She played four seasons for the Flames, leaving following the 2019–20 WNBL season.

McSpadden joined the Townsville Fire for the 2020 WNBL Hub season in Queensland. She continued on with the Fire in 2021–22 and 2022–23.

For the 2023–24 WNBL season, McSpadden returned to the Sydney Flames.

On 3 July 2025, McSpadden signed a two-year deal with the Sydney Flames.

=== State Leagues ===
In 2015, McSpadden played for the Newcastle Hunters in the Waratah League. In 2016, she played for the BA Centre of Excellence in the South East Australian Basketball League (SEABL). In 2017 and 2018, she played for the Sydney Sparks in the SEABL. She returned to the Hunters for the 2019 Waratah League season and continued with Newcastle in 2020.

In 2021, McSpadden joined the Rockhampton Cyclones of the NBL1 North. She continued with the Cyclones in 2022, 2023 and 2024. She joined the Diamond Valley Eagles of the NBL1 South for the 2025 season. She is set to join the Keilor Thunder for the 2026 NBL1 South season.

=== Other ===
In 2024, McSpadden helped the Tauranga Whai win the Tauihi Basketball Aotearoa championship.

In January 2025, McSpadden joined BK Lokomotiva Trutnov of the Czech Women's Basketball League. In 12 games to finish the 2024–25 season, she averaged 10.8 points, 8.6 rebounds and 1.8 assists per game.

== National team career ==
McSpadden made her international debut at the 2015 FIBA Oceania Under-16 Championship for Women in New Zealand with the U17 Sapphires, where she helped them qualify for the world championship the following year. At the world championship, the Sapphires won their inaugural title in Spain. After snapping Team USA's 28-game win streak at U17 level, Australia went on to take home Gold.

McSpadden went on to represent Australia at the 2017 FIBA Under-19 Women's Basketball World Cup and the 2019 World University Games.

In May 2025, McSpadden was named in the Australian national 3x3 team for the FIBA 3x3 Women's Series in China, where the team won silver.

In March 2026, McSpadden was named in the Australia 3x3 team for the FIBA 3x3 Champions Cup. The following month, she played at the 2026 FIBA 3x3 Asia Cup, helping the team win the gold medal. In June 2026, she was selected for the Australian 3x3 team for the 2026 Commonwealth Games in Glasgow. The team went on to win the gold medal.
