= Emma Clarke (basketball) =

Australian basketball player (born 2000)

No. 10 – Townsville Fire
- Position: Forward
- League: WNBL

Personal information
- Born: 18 March 2000 (age 26) Perth, Australia
- Listed height: 6 ft 1 in (1.85 m)

Career information
- College: Colorado (2018–2020)
- Playing career: 2020–present

Career history
- 2020–2022: Perth Lynx
- 2022–2025: Sydney Flames
- 2025–2026: Bendigo Spirit
- 2026–present: Townsville Fire
Medals
Representing Australia
Women's basketball
FIBA Under-18 Asian Championship
Bronze medal – third place	2018 India	Team
FIBA Under-17 Oceania Cup
Gold medal – first place	2017 Guam	Team
Women's 3x3 basketball
FIBA 3x3 World Cup
Silver medal – second place	2026 Warsaw	Team
Commonwealth Games
Gold medal – first place	2026 Glasgow	Team

Emma Clarke (born 18 March 2000) is an Australian professional basketball player for the Townsville Fire of the Women's National Basketball League (WNBL). She previously played for the Perth Lynx, Sydney Flames and Bendigo Spirit of the WNBL. She is also a member of the Australia women's national 3x3 team.

== Early life and education ==
Clarke was born to Laurel and Michael Bell, and has a younger brother, Jack. She graduated from the BA Centre of Excellence at the Australian Institute of Sport in 2017.

== Playing career ==
Clarke played college basketball at Colorado. During the 2018–19 season, in her freshman year, she appeared in all 30 games, with two starts, and averaged 4.6 points and 3.2 rebounds in 15.9 minutes per game. She made her first career start on 17 February 2019 against Arizona. She scored a season-high 15 points against Washington on 24 February 2019. During the 2019–20 season, in her sophomore year, she appeared in all 30 games, with 29 starts, and averaged 9.7 points and 4.6 rebounds per game.

On 24 March 2020, Clarke transferred to Texas Tech. She signed her national letter of intent on 15 April 2020. However, on 6 November 2020, she signed with the Perth Lynx of the WNBL. During the 2020 WNBL season she appeared in all 13 games and averaged 4.2 points and 3.1 rebounds per game. On 12 May 2021, she re-signed with the Lynx.

On 26 May 2022, she signed a two-year contract with the Sydney Flames. During the 2023 NBL1 West season with the Perry Lakes Hawks, she led the team in scoring and rebounding, averaging 19.7 points and 8.8 rebounds per game. On 23 January 2024, she signed with the Joondalup Wolves for the 2024 NBL1 West season. On 14 June 2024, she signed a two-year contract extension with the Flames.

After being released by the Flames she signed with the Bendigo Spirit for the remainder of the 2025–26 WNBL season on 3 January 2026. On 4 June 2026, she signed with the Townsville Fire.

== 3x3 career ==
In June 2026, Clarke represented Australia at the 2026 FIBA 3x3 World Cup and won a silver medal in the women's tournament, their best finish in FIBA 3x3 World Cup history. She then competed at the FIBA 3x3 Women's Series and helped Australia win gold for the first time at the tournament. She ranked first in player value (44.8), rebounds (26), blocks (5), highlights (17), double-fives (3) and total two-pointers made (10), while ranking second in scoring with 34 points and was subsequently named MVP.

In July 2026, she was selected to represent Australia at the 2026 Commonwealth Games. She helped Australia win a gold medal in 3x3 basketball. She missed the final due to a knee injury.
