= Mackenzie Clinch Hoycard =

Australian basketball player (born 1998)

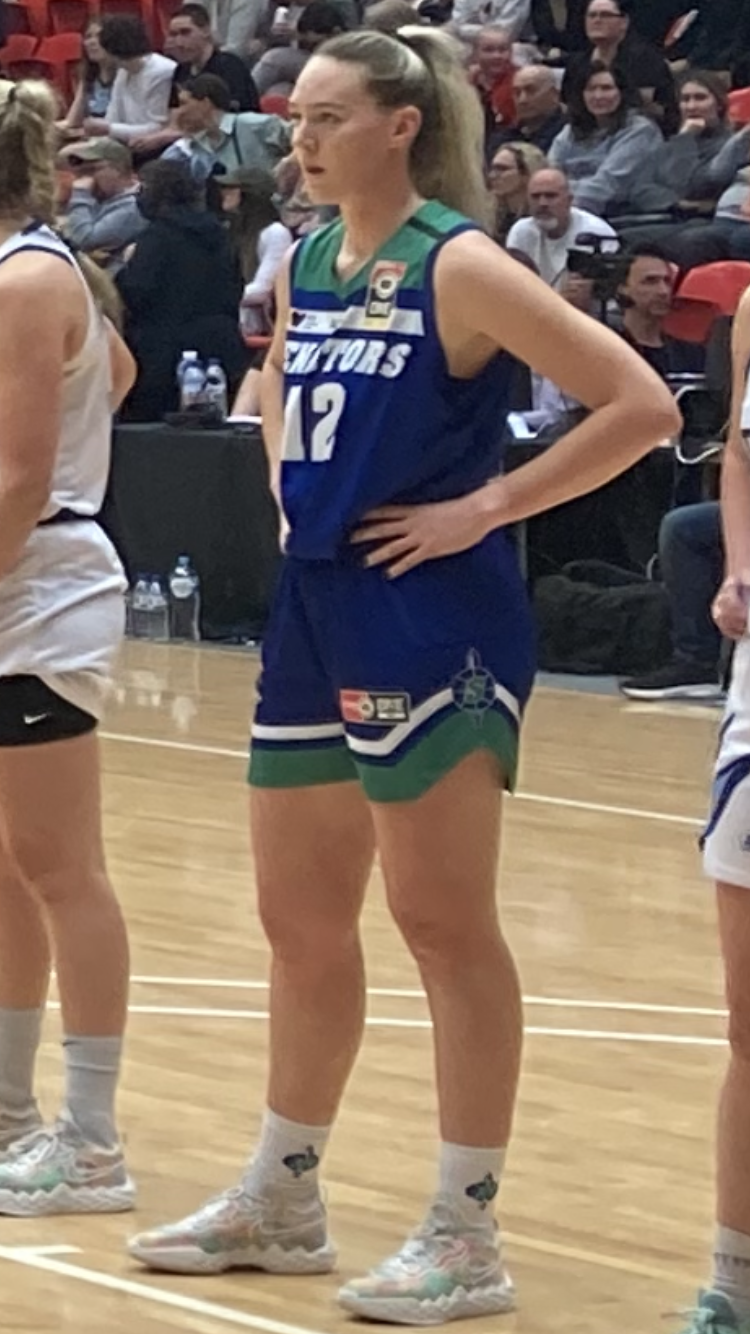
- Clinch Hoycard with the Warwick Senators in 2022

No. 12 – Geelong Venom
- Position: Forward
- League: WNBL

Personal information
- Born: 29 October 1998 (age 28) Kalgoorlie, Western Australia, Australia
- Listed height: 191 cm (6 ft 3 in)

Career information
- High school: John Paul College (Kalgoorlie, Western Australia)
- College: Hawaii (2017–2018)
- Playing career: 2020–present

Career history
- 2020–2023: Warwick Senators
- 2020–2025: Perth Lynx
- 2024: Southern Districts Spartans
- 2025–present: Warwick Senators
- 2025–present: Geelong Venom

Career highlights
- NBL1 National champion (2022); 2× NBL1 West champion (2022, 2026)

Mackenzie Clinch Hoycard (born 29 October 1998) is an Australian professional basketball player for the Geelong Venom of the Women's National Basketball League (WNBL). She is also contracted with the Warwick Senators of the NBL1 West. She played a season of college basketball for the Hawaii Rainbow Wahine before starting her WNBL career as a development player with the Perth Lynx in 2020. In 2022, she became a fully contracted player with the Lynx, going on to spend five seasons with the club. In 2025, she joined the Geelong Venom.

In 2022, Clinch Hoycard helped the Warwick Senators win the NBL1 West championship and NBL1 National championship. She won her second NBL1 West championship with the Senators in 2026.

== Early life and college career ==
Clinch Hoycard was born and raised in Kalgoorlie, Western Australia, where she attended St Mary's Primary School and John Paul College. As a teenager, she regularly travelled to Perth on weekends for basketball opportunities. She played in the Kalgoorlie-Boulder Basketball Association for Christian Brothers College (CBC) Basketball Club and was selected to the Australian U17 Sapphires squad in 2014 and the Australian U19 Gems squad in 2015 and 2016. She also showed talent in both tennis and netball as a junior.

In November 2016, Clinch Hoycard signed to play college basketball in the United States with the Hawaii Rainbow Wahine in the Big West Conference of the NCAA Division I.

As a freshman at Hawaii in 2017–18, Clinch Hoycard was limited to 13 games due to injury. She missed the start of the season, making her debuting on 30 December 2017 against Hawaii Pacific. She had career highs of nine points and six rebounds against Long Beach State on 24 February 2018. She averaged 1.5 points and 2.8 rebounds in 9.1 minutes per game. She fought through foot, knee and jaw injuries, as well as a serious concussion.

In October 2018, just weeks before the start of the 2018–19 season, Clinch Hoycard left the Rainbow Wahine program and returned to Australia citing homesickness.

After struggling with a mystery foot injury for six years, Clinch Hoycard underwent successful surgery in November 2018 after it was discovered she had two bone cysts. Her return to Western Australia resulted in multiple State Basketball League (SBL) offers, but she elected to play for her hometown Goldfields Giants with the Division 1 women's team in 2019.

== Professional career ==
Clinch Hoycard moved to Perth in 2020 to play for the Warwick Senators in the SBL. However, the SBL season was cancelled due to the COVID-19 pandemic. During the 2020 lockdowns, she began experiencing pain and swelling in her ankles after taking up running to keep fit. She was subsequently diagnosed with arthritis. To avoid the pain from a rolled ankle, she shifted her focus away from playing in the keyway and post, concentrating instead on becoming an elite shooter. She played for the Senators in the West Coast Classic and averaged 12.67 points, 7.08 rebounds and 2.67 assists in 12 games.

In November 2020, Clinch Hoycard joined the Perth Lynx of the Women's National Basketball League (WNBL) as a development player for the WNBL Hub season in Queensland. She appeared in five games during the season.

Clinch Hoycard re-joined the Senators for the inaugural NBL1 West season in 2021, where she averaged 15.71 points, 6.62 rebounds, 2.9 assists and 1.29 steals in 21 games. She shot a league-leading 44.44% from 3-point range.

Clinch Hoycard re-joined the Lynx as a development player for the 2021–22 WNBL season. After twelve months of being on medication for ankle arthritis, her knee began swelling too. She required three cortisone injections and had her knee drained three times during 2021–22 despite spending just over 26 minutes on court across the entire season. She began taking Sulfasalazine twice per day and Methotrexate once per month, which helped her long term. She averaged 1.2 points in 10 games during her second season. The Lynx made the WNBL grand final series in 2021–22, where they lost to the Melbourne Boomers.

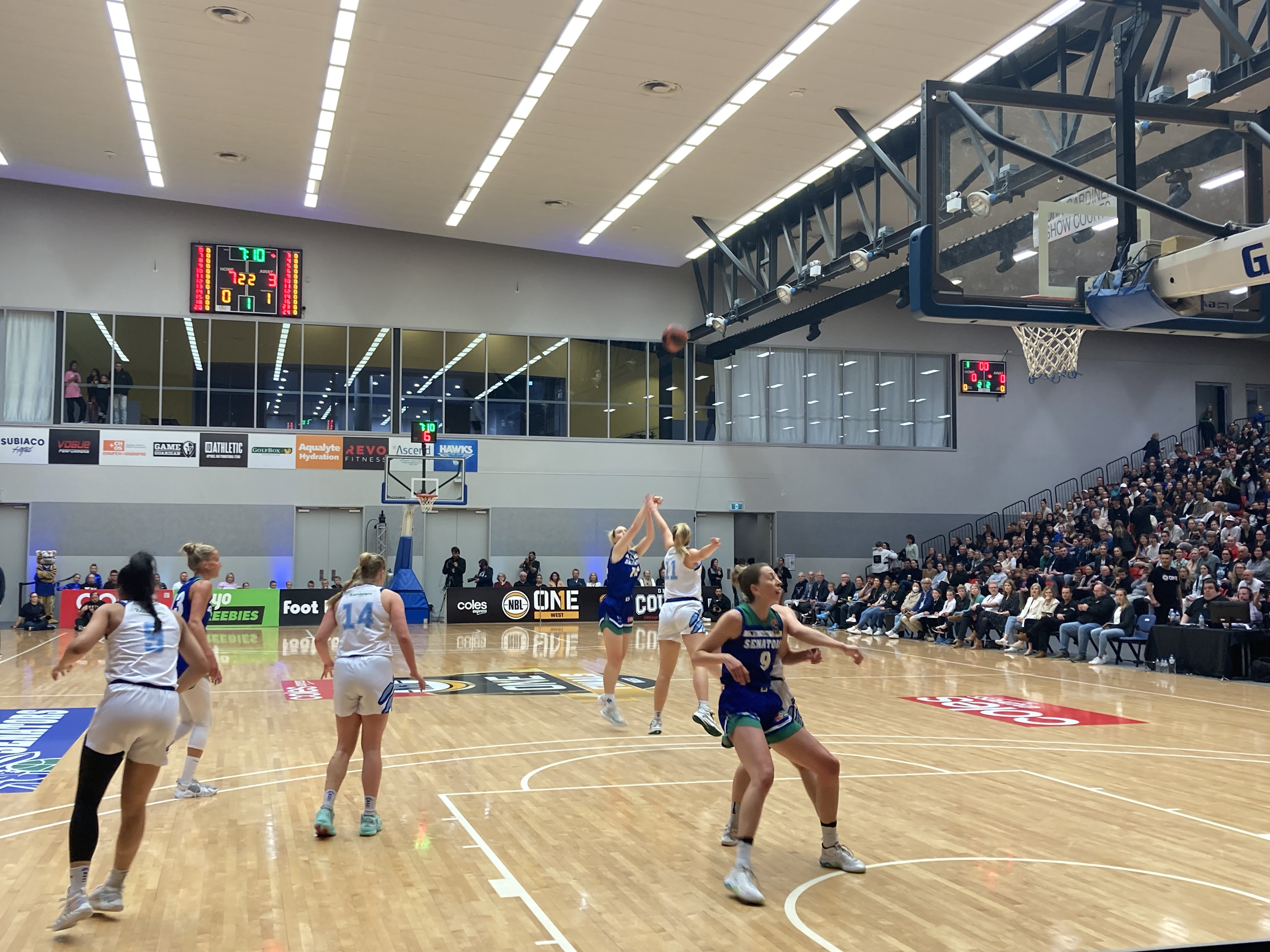
Clinch Hoycard shooting a 3-pointer during the 2022 NBL1 West Grand Final

In 2022, Clinch Hoycard helped the Senators reach the NBL1 West grand final, where they defeated the Willetton Tigers 87–61 to win the championship. She had 15 points and 13 rebounds. In 21 games, she averaged 13.86 points, 7.76 rebounds, 3.05 assists and 1.86 steals per game. At the NBL1 National Finals, the Senators were crowned national champions with an 83–75 win over the Ringwood Hawks in the championship game. Clinch Hoycard had 11 points, five rebounds and three steals.

For the 2022–23 WNBL season, Clinch Hoycard was elevated to the Lynx's main roster as a fully contracted player. She scored a season-high 10 points against the Townsville Fire on 17 December 2022. In 23 games, she averaged 4.0 points and 1.8 rebounds per game.

Clinch Hoycard re-joined the Senators for the 2023 NBL1 West season. In 22 games, she averaged 14.18 points, 10.64 rebounds, 4.0 assists and 1.0 steals per game.

Clinch Hoycard re-joined the Lynx for the 2023–24 WNBL season. On 13 December 2023, scored a career-high 15 points in a career-high 28 minutes in a 98–58 win over the Sydney Flames. The Lynx made the WNBL grand final series in 2023–24, where they lost to the Southside Flyers. She averaged 5.5 points, 3.7 rebounds and 1.2 assists in 26 games.

Clinch Hoycard joined the Southern Districts Spartans of the NBL1 North for the 2024 season. In 18 games, she averaged 9.06 points, 6.89 rebounds, 1.56 assists and 1.22 steals per game.

On 16 July 2024, Clinch Hoycard re-signed with the Lynx for the 2024–25 WNBL season. She was named vice-captain of the team.

Clinch Hoycard re-joined the Warwick Senators for the 2025 NBL1 West season. She helped the team return to the NBL1 West Grand Final, where they lost 91–71 to the Cockburn Cougars with Clinch Hoycard recording five points and 13 rebounds. In 23 games, she averaged 15.91 points, 9.35 rebounds, 2.91 assists and 1.61 steals per game.

On 4 July 2025, Clinch Hoycard signed with the Geelong Venom for the 2025–26 WNBL season.

Clinch Hoycard re-joined the Senators for the 2026 NBL1 West season. She helped the Senators return to the NBL1 West Grand Final, where they defeated the Cougars 102–76 to win the championship. Clinch Hoycard had 22 points and six 3-pointers in winning her second NBL1 West title.

On 15 May 2026, Clinch Hoycard re-signed with the Venom for the 2026–27 WNBL season.

She is set to re-join the Senators for the 2027 NBL1 West season.

== Personal life ==
Clinch Hoycard is the daughter of Craig Hoycard and Fiona Clinch. She has two younger sisters, Emmett and Alexanda. Her father played in the West Australian Football League (WAFL) for Swan Districts and East Fremantle, and was then best on ground in two premierships for Mines Rovers in the Goldfields Football League. Alexanda played for the inaugural Goldfields Giants women's team in the NBL1 West in 2022.
