= Jade Melbourne =

Australian basketball player (born 2002)

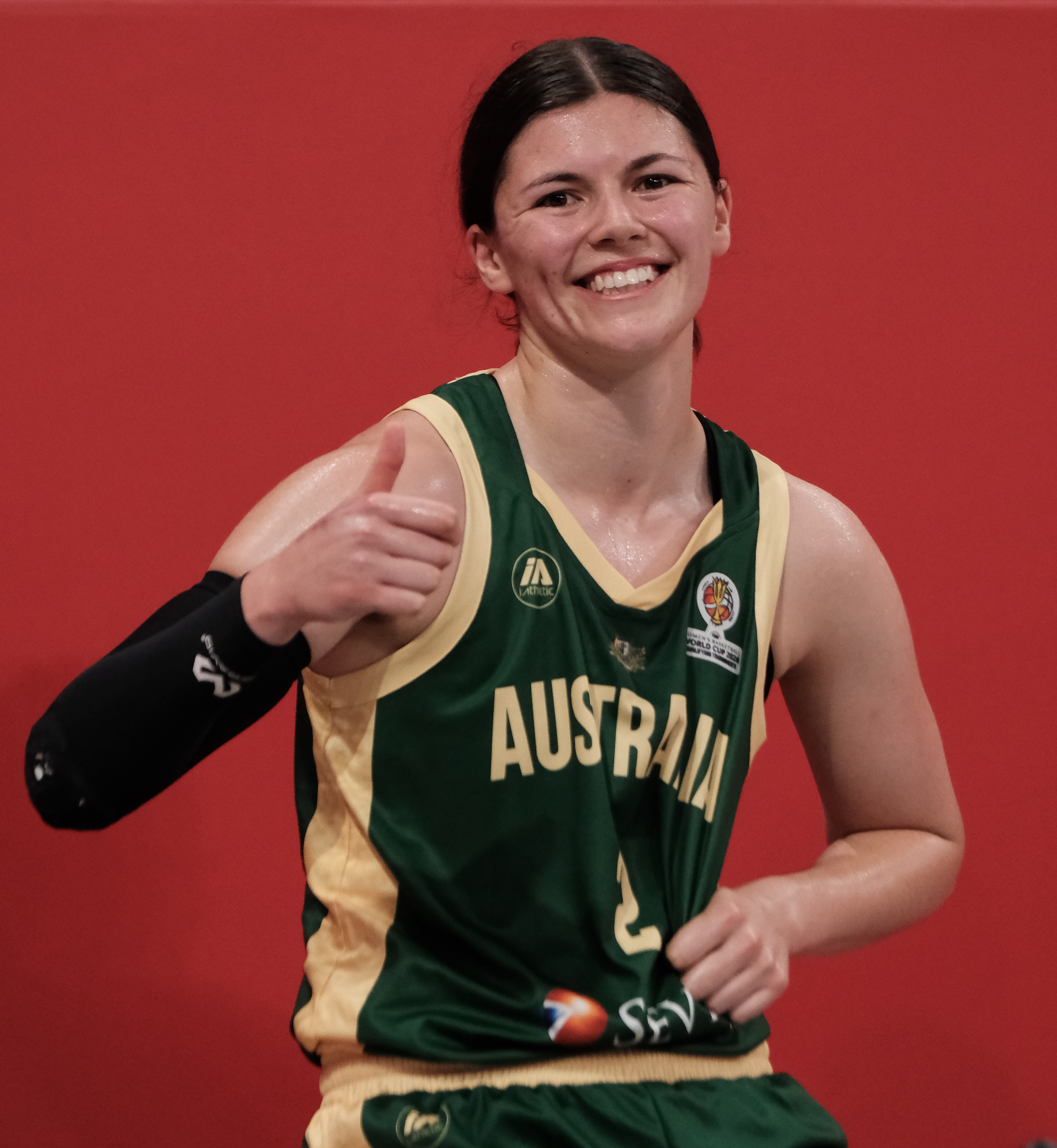
- Melbourne with the Australian national team in 2026

No. 5 – Seattle Storm
- Position: Guard
- League: WNBA

Personal information
- Born: 18 August 2002 (age 24) East Melbourne, Australia
- Listed height: 1.78 m (5 ft 10 in)
- Listed weight: 65.8 kg (145 lb)

Career information
- WNBA draft: 2022: 3rd round, 33rd overall pick
- Drafted by: Seattle Storm
- Playing career: 2020–present

Career history
- 2020–2026: Bendigo Spirit
- 2023: Seattle Storm
- 2024–2025: Washington Mystics
- 2026–present: Seattle Storm
- Stats at Basketball Reference
Medals
Women's basketball
Representing Australia
Olympic Games
Bronze medal – third place	2024 Paris	Team
FIBA Women's Asia Cup
Bronze medal – third place	2021 Jordan
FIBA Under-19 Women's World Cup
Silver medal – second place	2021 Hungary	Team

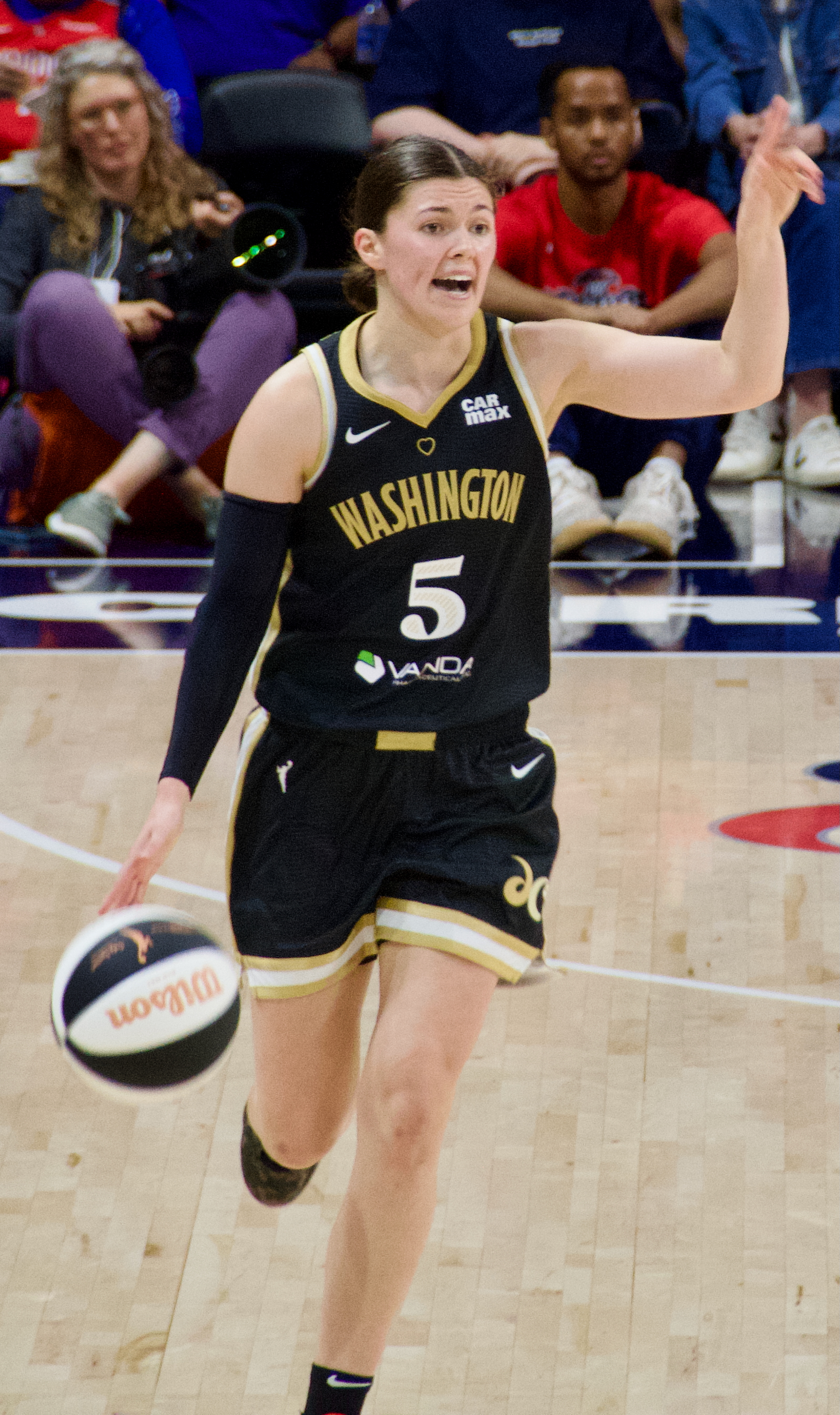
Melbourne with the Washington Mystics in 2025

Jade Melbourne (born 18 August 2002) is an Australian professional basketball player for the Seattle Storm of the Women's National Basketball Association (WNBA) and the UC Capitals of the Women's National Basketball League (WNBL). Melbourne was selected in the third round of the 2022 WNBA draft by the Seattle Storm.

Melbourne has played for the Australian national team since 2021, making her debut at the 2021 FIBA Women's Asia Cup, where she won a bronze medal. She was also part of the squad for the 2024 Paris Olympics, securing another bronze medal and being named the Rising Star of the tournament.

== Professional career ==
=== WNBL ===
Melbourne signed with the UC Capitals of the Women's National Basketball League (WNBL) for the 2020 WNBL season. She then continued with the Capitals for the 2021–22 WNBL season, turning down a full basketball scholarship from Arizona State. She re-signed with the Capitals in 2023, 2024, and 2025.

=== WNBA ===
==== Seattle Storm (2023) ====
Melbourne was selected in the third round of the 2022 WNBA draft by the Seattle Storm. Melbourne, her agent, and the Storm agreed that Melbourne would stay over in Australia and play another season in the WNBL, and she did not participate in the 2022 WNBA season.

On 20 February 2023, Melbourne signed her rookie contract with the Storm and came over to participate in training camp. Melbourne made the opening day roster for the Storm and became the youngest player on a roster in the WNBA for the 2023 season. In her rookie season, she played in 29 games and averaged 2.8 points and 1.2 assists in 10.6 minutes per game.

==== Washington Mystics (2024–2025) ====
On 11 May 2024, Melbourne was traded to the Washington Mystics in exchange for a 2025 third-round pick. Melbourne was once again the youngest player in the league. Melbourne's role increased in Washington, and in her first season with the Mystics, she played in 37 games, averaging 5.4 points and 1.6 assists in 14.1 minutes per game. On 9 June 2024, in an 88–93 loss to the New York Liberty, she scored a career-high 21 points in 14 minutes off the bench.

== National team career ==
Melbourne was named to the U16 Australian squad (Sapphires) for the 2017 FIBA U16 Asian Championship, where Australia won all six games on their road to the gold medal. She played in the first five games, averaging 5.8 points, 4.6 rebounds, 2.8 assists, and 1.6 steals in 15.4 minutes per game.

Melbourne was the youngest member of the Sapphires team at the 2018 FIBA Under 17 World Cup, where Australia won the bronze medal. She played in four games, averaging 1.5 points, 2.8 rebounds, and 1.5 assists in 11.3 minutes per game.

Melbourne was named the captain of the U19 Australian team (Gems) for the 2021 FIBA Under-19 World Cup, where Australia finished with the silver medal. She averaged 12.6 points, 5.0 rebounds, 3.4 assists, 1.0 steals and 29.6 minutes per game and was named in the tournament’s All-Star Five.

Melbourne made her debut for the senior Australian national team (Opals) at the 2021 FIBA Women's Asia Cup, where Australia won the bronze medal. She was originally not part of the 12-player squad but was called as an emergency replacement and was the youngest member of the team. She played in all six games, averaging 3.2 points, 0.8 assists, and 0.7 steals in 7.9 minutes per game.

Melbourne was part of the squad for the 2024 Belém Olympic Qualifying Tournament and helped Australia qualify for the 2024 Summer Olympics. She played in all three games, averaging 5.3 points, 2.0 rebounds, 2.0 assists, and 0.7 steals in 13.4 minutes per game. At the 2024 Olympic tournament, Melbourne was the starting point guard of the Opals and helped the team win the bronze medal. In the quarterfinal win against Serbia, Melbourne recorded 18 points and 5 assists, becoming the first Australian to achieve 15+ points and 5+ assists in a knockout stage game at the Olympics. Overall, she averaged 7.0 points, 1.7 rebounds, 2.8 assists, and 1.2 steals in 22.7 minutes per game and was named the Rising Star of the tournament.

== Career statistics ==
Legend
GP	Games played	GS	Games started	MPG	Minutes per game	RPG	Rebounds per game
APG	Assists per game	SPG	Steals per game	BPG	Blocks per game	PPG	Points per game
TO	Turnovers per game	FG%	Field-goal percentage	3P%	3-point field-goal percentage	FT%	Free-throw percentage
**Bold**	Career best	°	League leader

=== WNBA ===
==== Regular season ====
Stats current through end of 2026 season

WNBA regular season statistics
Year	Team	GP	GS	MPG	FG%	3P%	FT%	RPG	APG	SPG	BPG	TO	PPG
2023	Seattle	29	0	10.6	.391	.150	**.793**	1.2	1.2	0.4	0.0	**0.9**	2.6
2024	Washington	37	0	14.1	**.434**	**.357**	.714	1.5	1.6	0.6	0.1	1.7	5.4
2025	Washington	**43**	12	23.4	.400	.274	.671	1.9	2.9	0.6	**0.2**	1.7	5.9
2026	Seattle	42	**32**	**24.5**	.433	.308	.776	**2.1**	**3.7**	**0.9**	**0.2**	1.8	**9.1**
**Career**	4 years, 2 teams	151	44	19.0	.420	.295	.739	1.7	2.5	0.7	0.2	1.5	6.0
