= Brian Carlwell =

American basketball player (born 1987)

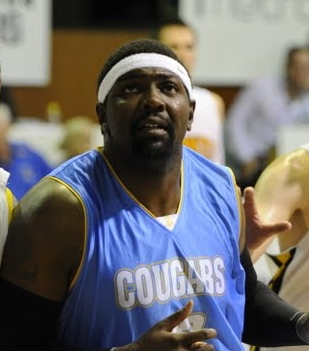
- Carlwell with the Cockburn Cougars in 2013

Personal information
- Born: October 18, 1987 (age 39) Maywood, Illinois, U.S.
- Listed height: 211 cm (6 ft 11 in)
- Listed weight: 120 kg (265 lb)

Career information
- High school: Proviso East (Maywood, Illinois)
- College: Illinois (2006–2008); San Diego State (2009–2011)
- NBA draft: 2011: undrafted
- Playing career: 2012–2021
- Position: Center
- Coaching career: 2023–present

Career history

Playing
- 2012: Cockburn Cougars
- 2012–2013: Argentino de Junín
- 2013: Cockburn Cougars
- 2013: Iwate Big Bulls
- 2016–2019: Perry Lakes Hawks
- 2021: Mandurah Magic

Coaching
- 2023–2024: Kalamunda Eastern Suns (assistant)

Career highlights
- 2× SBL champion (2012, 2018)

Brian Andrew Carlwell (born October 18, 1987) is an American basketball coach and former player. He played college basketball for Illinois and San Diego State before playing professionally in Australia, Argentina and Japan. Best known for his time spent in Australia, Carlwell is a two-time SBL champion, having won his first in 2012 with the Cockburn Cougars and his second in 2018 with the Perry Lakes Hawks.

== High school career ==
Carlwell attended Proviso East High School in his hometown of Maywood, Illinois. As a junior playing for the Proviso East Pirates basketball team in 2004–05, Carlwell was an all-state choice after averaging 15 points, 12 rebounds and six blocks per game.

As a senior at Proviso East in 2005–06, Carlwell was a first-team all-state pick by the Chicago Tribune, Chicago Sun-Times, Associated Press, Champaign-Urbana News-Gazette and Illinois Basketball Coaches Association. He averaged 18.8 points, 12.4 rebounds and 5.4 blocks as a senior en route to earning West Suburban Gold Conference MVP honors.

== College career ==
=== Illinois (2006–2008) ===
As a freshman at Illinois in 2006–07, Carlwell played in 26 games before missing the final eight contests due to head injuries sustained in an alcohol-related crash during a severe blizzard. Carlwell was a passenger in a car driven by teammate Jamar Smith; both had been drinking heavily, and the car spun and crashed into a tree, passenger door first. Smith initially thought Carlwell had been killed in the crash.

Carlwell averaged 1.7 points and 1.4 rebounds in 7.0 minutes in his freshman year, as Illinois finished 23–12 and advanced to the NCAA Tournament where they lost their first-round game to Virginia Tech.

Carlwell returned to the Fighting Illini for his sophomore season in 2007–08, but he managed just three games before suffering a knee injury during a practice session on November 30 that sidelined him for the rest of the season. On February 21, 2008, Carlwell announced his decision to transfer from Illinois following the spring semester.

=== San Diego State (2009–2011) ===
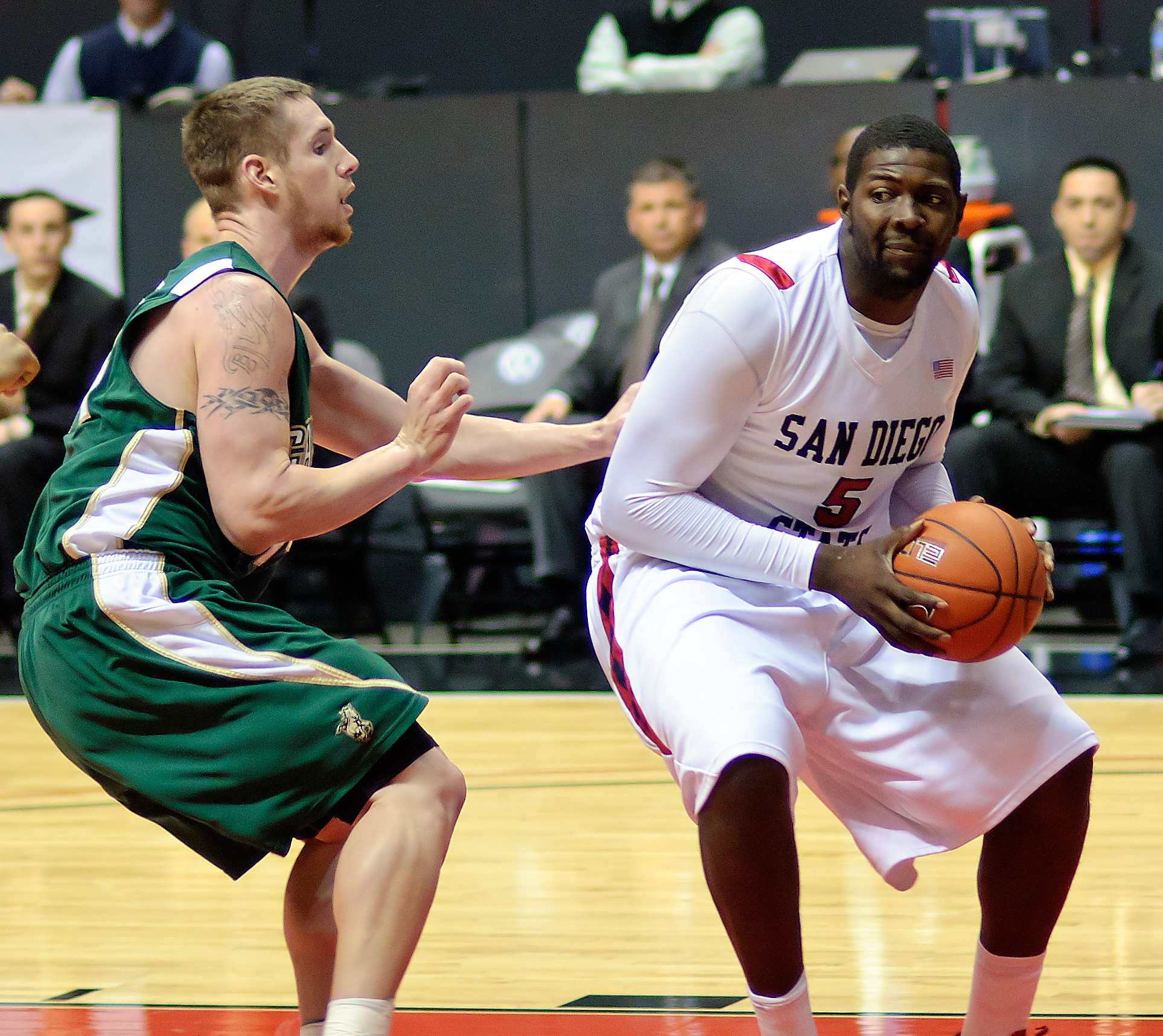
Carlwell in December 2010

In June 2008, Carlwell transferred to San Diego State University and subsequently sat out the 2008–09 season due to NCAA transfer regulations.

As a junior at San Diego State in 2009–10, Carlwell was one of four Aztecs to play in all 34 games, as he averaged 4.7 points and 2.8 rebounds in 14.4 minutes per game. On December 31, 2009, he had a season-best game with 13 points and 6 rebounds against Pomona-Pitzer.

As a senior in 2010–11, Carlwell played in all 37 games for the Aztecs and averaged 3.8 points and 2.7 rebounds, while shooting 51.4 percent from the field. On March 1, 2011, he scored a career-high 15 points against Wyoming.

On August 18, 2011, Carlwell was denied a sixth year of eligibility by the NCAA, effectively ending his college career. In his two-year career at San Diego State, he played in all 71 games, starting four times, and averaged 4.2 points, on 56.5 percent shooting, and 2.7 rebounds.

== Professional career ==
=== Cockburn Cougars (2012) ===
In February 2012, Carlwell signed with the Cockburn Cougars of the State Basketball League (SBL) in Australia for the 2012 season. He made his debut for the Cougars in the team's season opener on March 17, recording 27 points, 16 rebounds and four blocks in a 91–88 loss to the Perth Redbacks. On June 8, he scored a season-high 31 points in a 149–84 win over the Rockingham Flames. Carlwell helped the Cougars finish in third place with a 17–9 record. In game one of the quarter-finals, Carlwell recorded 18 points and a season-high 25 rebounds in a 106–74 win over the Redbacks. The Cougars went to advance through to the SBL Grand Final, where they defeated the East Perth Eagles 105–72 to win the championship behind Carlwell's 21 points. Carlwell appeared in all 32 games for the Cougars in 2012, averaging 20.8 points, 13.6 rebounds, 2.4 assists and 2.2 blocks per game.

=== Argentino de Junín (2012–2013) ===
On August 22, 2012, Carlwell signed with Argentino de Junín of the Liga Nacional de Básquet (LNB) in Argentina for the 2012–13 season. He joined the club in September and made his debut with 17 points and eight rebounds in an 81–67 win over Gimnasia Indalo. On March 3, 2013, he scored a season-high 18 points in another win over Gimnasia Indalo. In the first round of the playoffs, Carlwell helped Argentino defeat Bahía Basket 3–2 in the best-of-five series. They went on to lose 3–0 to Boca Juniors in the second round. Carlwell appeared in 49 games (41 regular season, eight playoff) for the club in 2012–13, averaging 8.3 points and 5.2 rebounds per game.

=== Second stint with Cockburn (2013) ===
In April 2013, Carlwell re-joined the Cockburn Cougars for the rest of the 2013 SBL season. He made his season debut for the Cougars on April 20, recording 21 points, 13 rebounds and four blocks in a 110–101 loss to the Willetton Tigers. On May 4, he scored a career-high 38 points in a 113–103 win over the Stirling Senators. A week later, he had 31 points and 22 rebounds against the Lakeside Lightning, recording consecutive 30+ point games for the first time in his college/professional career. On July 6, he recorded 18 points and a career-high 28 rebounds in a 103–86 loss to the Rockingham Flames. The Cougars missed the finals in 2013, as they finished in 10th place and a 10–16 record. In 18 games, Carlwell averaged 22.1 points, 15.6 rebounds, 1.3 assists and 2.4 blocks per game.

=== Iwate Big Bulls (2013) ===
On September 19, 2013, Carlwell signed with the Iwate Big Bulls of the Japanese bj league. He made his debut for the Bulls in the team's season opener on October 5, scoring 11 points in a 68–53 loss to Aomori Wat's. In the team's fourth game of the season on October 13, he recorded a double-double with 10 points and 10 rebounds in a 75–61 win over Niigata Albirex BB. He appeared in Iwate's first eight games to begin the season before being released by the club on November 5. He helped the team go 4–4 and averaged 5.8 points and 5.3 rebounds per game.

=== Perry Lakes Hawks (2016–2019) ===
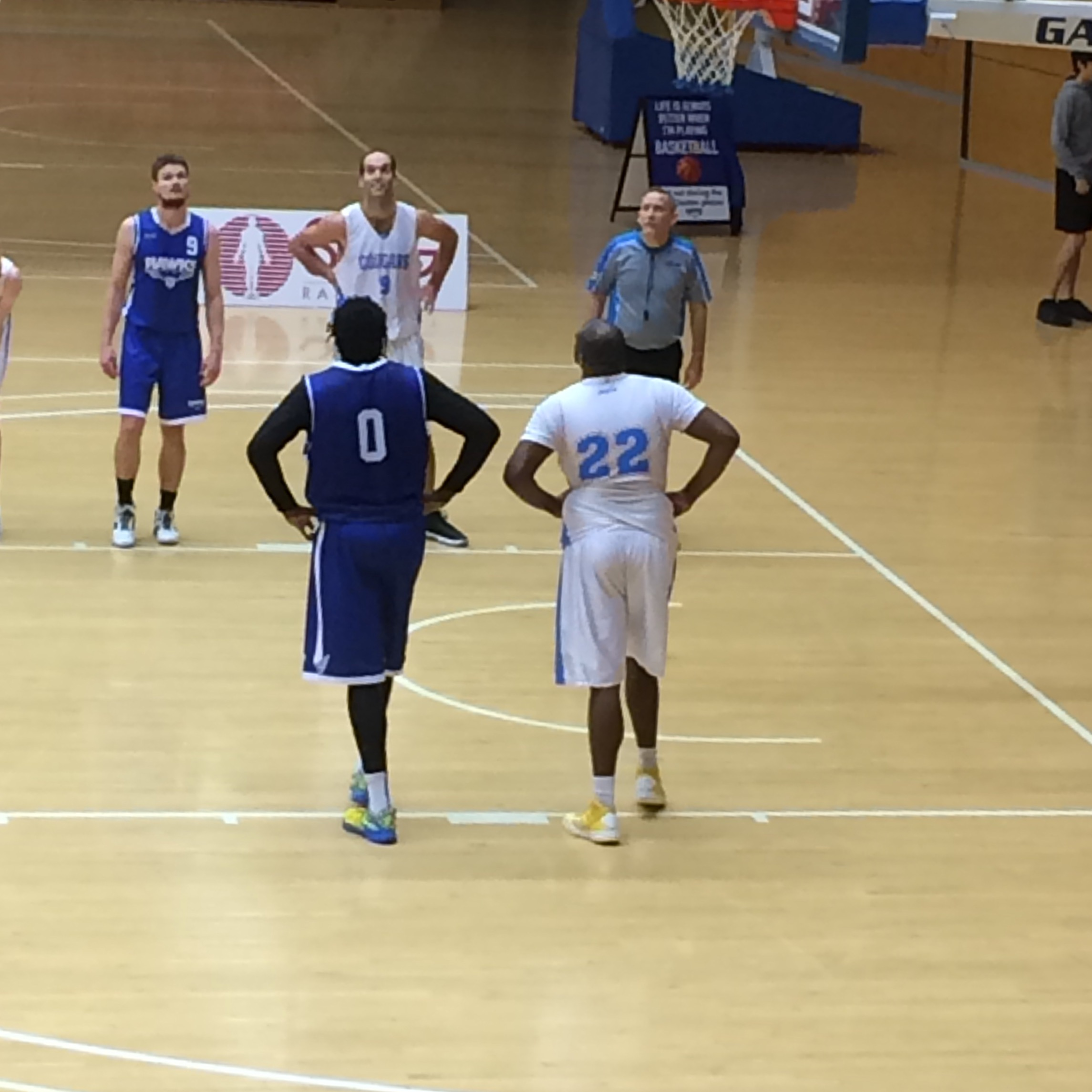
Carlwell (#0) with the Hawks in June 2016

After taking time away from the game to focus on starting a new family, Carlwell returned to the SBL in 2016 and joined the Perry Lakes Hawks. In his fourth game for the Hawks on April 9, Carlwell recorded 20 points and 21 rebounds in a 100–94 overtime loss to the Stirling Senators. On May 15, he had 23 points and 20 rebounds in a 116–90 win over the Kalamunda Eastern Suns. On May 28, he recorded 26 points and a season-high 23 rebounds in a 101–81 loss to the Rockingham Flames. On June 4, he scored a season-high 30 points in a 114–88 win over the Willetton Tigers. In the Hawks' regular-season finale on July 29, Carlwell had his fourth 20/20 game of the season with 26 points and 20 rebounds in a 102–96 win over the Suns. The Hawks finished in eighth place with an 11–15 record and lost 2–1 to the Cockburn Cougars in the quarter-finals. In 28 games for the Hawks in 2016, Carlwell averaged 18.3 points, 12.1 rebounds, 1.9 assists and 1.7 blocks per game.

Carlwell re-joined the Hawks for the 2017 season, coming into the new year better prepared and in much better shape. In the Hawks' third game of the season on March 31, Carlwell recorded 24 points and 15 rebounds in a 97–90 win over the Cockburn Cougars. On April 28, he recorded season highs of 28 points and 20 rebounds in a 90–85 win over the Perth Redbacks. The Hawks finished the regular season in eighth position with a 12–14 record and lost 2–1 to the Willetton Tigers in the quarter-finals, with Carlwell recording 27 points and 15 rebounds in a game one win. He appeared in all 29 games for the Hawks in 2017, averaging 15.48 points, 9.83 rebounds and 1.17 assists per game.

Carlwell returned to the Hawks in 2018. On April 7, he scored a season-high 24 points against the Rockingham Flames. The Hawks started the season with a 6–8 record, before going on a 12-game winning streak to finish in fourth place with an 18–8 record. Carlwell helped the Hawks advance through to the SBL Grand Final, where they defeated the Joondalup Wolves 94–87 to win the championship behind Carlwell's 21 points and 18 rebounds. He appeared in all 33 games for the Hawks in 2018, averaging 9.97 points, 7.52 rebounds and 1.06 assists per game.

Carlwell returned to the Hawks in 2019 as a non-restricted player, having qualified to play as a local. On May 3, he scored a season-high 18 points against the Suns. He helped the Hawks finish the regular season in fifth place with an 18–8 record, before reaching the semi-finals, where they lost 2–0 to the Wolves. He appeared in all 30 games for the Hawks in 2019, averaging 9.3 points and 6 rebounds per game.

=== Perth Redbacks and Mandurah Magic (2020–2021) ===
Carlwell was set to play for the Perth Redbacks in the 2020 SBL season but never made his debut after the season was cancelled due to the COVID-19 pandemic.

In 2021, Carlwell joined the Mandurah Magic for the inaugural NBL1 West season. He helped the Magic advance out of the first round of the playoffs for the first time in club history. In 22 games, he averaged 7.81 points and 4.04 rebounds per game.

== Coaching career ==
In January 2023, Carlwell joined the Kalamunda Eastern Suns men's team as an assistant coach for the 2023 NBL1 West season. He re-joined the Suns as an assistant for the 2024 NBL1 West season.

== Personal life ==
Carwell's brother, Ronnie, played four years of college basketball for Illinois State.

On February 12, 2007, Carlwell suffered a severe concussion when the car he was travelling in, driven by inebriated teammate Jamar Smith, slammed into a tree on an icy road in Champaign, Illinois. Having been knocked unconscious, Smith thought Carlwell was dead and drove him back to his apartment in a panic. Upon arriving back at the apartment complex, residents called 9-1-1; Carlwell was taken to Carle Foundation Hospital in nearby Urbana where he was initially listed in critical condition. Carlwell's concussion was severe enough that he spent several days in intensive care. Smith was subsequently charged with a DUI and leaving the scene of an accident. Carlwell and Smith remained close friends following the incident, and in 2010, Carlwell was named the godfather of Smith's son.
