= Tom Ludwig =

American basketball coach

Personal information
- Born: 1944 (age 81–82) Sault Ste. Marie, Michigan

Career information
- High school: Sault Area (Sault Ste. Marie, Michigan)
- College: Michigan (1962–1965)
- NBA draft: 1965: undrafted
- Position: Guard
- Number: 23
- Coaching career: 1970–2001

Career history

Coaching
- 1970–1974: Lake Superior State
- 1979–1981: Ferris State (interim)
- 1981–1996: Ferris State
- 1997: Crvena zvezda
- 2001: ratiopharm Ulm

Career highlights
- 7× GLIAC regular season champion (1982, 1983, 1987–1990, 1995); 5× GLIAC Coach of the Year (1982, 1983, 1987, 1989, 1990)

Horace Thomas Ludwig Sr. (born 1944) is an American former college and professional basketball coach.

== College career ==
Ludwig played college basketball for the University of Michigan Wolverines for four seasons where he helped to capture two Big Ten Conference titles and a second-place finish at the 1965 NCAA Championships. Over 38 games in four seasons, he averaged 0.9 points and 0.3 rebounds per game.

== Coaching career ==
Ludwig coached at Lake Superior State from 1970 to 1974.

=== Ferris State ===
Ludwig compiled a 266–172 (.607) overall record as head coach of the Ferris State men's basketball program (1981–1995), achieving seven GLIAC titles in his 14 full seasons. Guard Jarvis Walker was one of his players at Ferris State.

He was suspended in 1995.

=== Europe ===
Ludwig had two stints in Europe. On 12 October 1997, Crvena zvezda of the YUBA League hired Ludwig as their new head coach. He coached the club in 16 games. He is the only non–European head coach of the Zvezda. In 2001, he led ratiopharm Ulm in the German 2. Basketball Bundesliga.

== Awards and honors ==
- GLIAC Men's Basketball champion: 7 (1981–82, 1982–83, 1986–87, 1987–88, 1988–89, 1989–90)

Individual

- Upper Peninsula of Michigan Sports Hall of Fame: Class 1994
- GLIAC Men's Basketball Coach of the Year: 1982, 1983, 1987 (with Charlie Parker, WSU), 1989 and 1990

== See also ==
- List of KK Crvena zvezda head coaches
