= 2013 FIBA Oceania Championship for Women =

FIBA Oceania Championship for Women 2013
15th FIBA Oceanian Women's Basketball Championship
- Official logo of the 2013 FIBA Oceania Championship for Women

Tournament details
- Host countries: New Zealand; Australia
- Dates: 14–18 August
- Teams: 2 (from 1 federation)
- Venues: 2 (in 2 host cities)

Final positions
- Champions: Australia (14th title)

Tournament statistics
- Top scorer: (New Zealand) Edmondson (22.0)
- Top rebounds: (Australia) Jackson (8.0)
- Top assists: (Australia) Snell (New Zealand) Cocks (3.0)
- PPG (Team): Australia (75.0)
- RPG (Team): Australia (38.5)
- APG (Team): Australia (12.5)

The 2013 FIBA Oceania Championship for Women was the 15th edition of the tournament. The tournament featured a two-game series between Australia and New Zealand between 14 and 18 August. Game one was held in Auckland, New Zealand followed by the second game in Canberra, Australia.

== Rosters ==
Australia women's national basketball team roster
Players
Coaches

Pos.	No.	Name	Age – Date of birth	Height	Club	Ctr.
G	4	Natalie Hurst	30 – 8 April 1983	1.63 m (5 ft 4 in)	Canberra Capitals	(Australia)
G	5	Kelly Wilson	28 – 1 January 1985	1.70 m (5 ft 7 in)	Bendigo Spirit	(Australia)
F	6	Jennifer Screen	31 – 19 February 1982	1.80 m (5 ft 11 in)	Adelaide Lightning	(Australia)
C	7	Cayla Francis	24 – 1 May 1989	1.92 m (6 ft 4 in)	Rezé-Nantes Basket 44	(France)
C	8	Natalie Burton	24 – 23 May 1989	1.94 m (6 ft 4 in)	West Coast Waves	(Australia)
G	9	Tess Madgen	23 – 12 August 1990	1.80 m (5 ft 11 in)	Melbourne Boomers	(Australia)
G	10	Hanna Zavecz	27 – 21 August 1985	1.83 m (6 ft 0 in)	Logan Thunder	(Australia)
F	11	Laura Hodges	29 – 13 December 1983	1.88 m (6 ft 2 in)	Adelaide Lightning	(Australia)
G	12	Belinda Snell	32 – 10 January 1981	1.80 m (5 ft 11 in)	CCC Polkowice	(Poland)
G	13	Kristen Veal	32 – 21 July 1981	1.76 m (5 ft 9 in)	Logan Thunder	(Australia)
F/C	14	Marianna Tolo	24 – 2 July 1989	1.96 m (6 ft 5 in)	CJM Bourges Basket	(France)
F/C	15	Lauren Jackson	32 – 11 May 1981	1.95 m (6 ft 5 in)	Seattle Storm	(United States)

Head coach

- (Australia) Brendan Joyce

Assistant coach(es)

- (Australia) Damien Cotter
- (Australia) Lori Chizik

Legend

- Club – describes last
  club before the tournament
- Age – describes age
  on 14 August 2013

New Zealand Women's National Basketball Team roster
Players
Coaches

Pos.	No.	Name	Age – Date of birth	Height	Club	Ctr.
F	4	Kalani Purcell	18 – 13 January 1995	1.88 m (6 ft 2 in)	Waikato Wizards	(New Zealand)
C	5	Megan Craig	20 – 11 February 1993	2.03 m (6 ft 8 in)	Albany Great Danes	(United States)
F	6	Penina Davidson	17 – 2 September 1995	1.83 m (6 ft 0 in)	Auckland Lady Hawks	(New Zealand)
F	7	Antonia Edmondson	26 – 10 May 1987	1.83 m (6 ft 0 in)	West Coast Waves	(Australia)
G	8	Samara Gallaher	20 – 2 October 1992	1.78 m (5 ft 10 in)	Otago Gold Rush	(New Zealand)
G	9	Micaela Cocks	27 – 2 May 1986	1.74 m (5 ft 9 in)	Townsville Fire	(Australia)
F	10	Lisa Wallbutton	27 – 14 January 1986	1.83 m (6 ft 0 in)	West Coast Waves	(Australia)
F	11	Jess Bygate	21 – 10 January 1992	1.85 m (6 ft 1 in)	Dickinson State Blue Hawks	(United States)
F	12	Casey Lockwood	27 – 5 November 1985	1.85 m (6 ft 1 in)	Townsville Fire	(Australia)
G	14	Jordan Hunter	22 – 20 August 1990	1.72 m (5 ft 8 in)	Auckland Lady Hawks	(New Zealand)
F	15	Stella Beck	17 – 25 September 1995	1.79 m (5 ft 10 in)	Hutt Valley-Porirua Flyers	(New Zealand)

Head coach

- (Australia) Kereama Kennedy

Assistant coach(es)

- (Australia) Aik Ho
- (Australia) Dean Kinsman

Legend

- (C) Team captain
- Club – describes last
  club before the tournament
- Age – describes age
  on 14 August 2013

== Results ==
Team 1	Agg.	Team 2	1st leg	2nd leg
New Zealand	116–150	Australia	50–66	66–84

All times are local (UTC+12).

=== Game 1 ===
ABC1

14 August 2013
17:00

Boxscore

New Zealand	50–66	Australia
Scoring by quarter: 13–17, 13–17, 14–23, 10–9
Pts: Edmondson 18; Rebs: Edmondson 6 Asts: five players 2		Pts: Jackson 22; Rebs: Jackson 9 Asts: Screen 5

North Shore Events Centre, Auckland, New Zealand
Referees: Elena Chernova (RUS), Toni Caldwell (AUS), Tim Brown (NZL)

=== Game 2 ===
ABC1

18 August 2013
14:00

Boxscore

Australia	84–66	New Zealand
Scoring by quarter: 20–16, 19–18, 27–14, 18–18
Pts: Jackson 21; Rebs: Hurst 10; Asts: Snell 4		Pts: Edmondson 26; Rebs: Cocks 9 Asts: Cocks 4

AIS Arena, Canberra, Australia
Referees: Elena Chernova (RUS), Toni Caldwell (AUS), Tim Brown (NZL)
