= Casey Lockwood =

American-New Zealand basketball player

Personal information
- Born: 5 November 1985 (age 41)
- Listed height: 6 ft 1 in (1.85 m)

Career information
- High school: Marin Catholic (Kentfield, California)
- College: Princeton (2003–2007)
- WNBA draft: 2007: undrafted
- Playing career: 2011–present
- Position: Forward

Career history
- 2011–2012: Otago Gold Rush
- 2011–2013: Townsville Fire
- 2013; 2015: Joondalup Wolves
- 2019; 2023: Sunshine Coast Phoenix

Career highlights
- SBL champion (2013); WCC champion (2011); WBC Most Valuable Player (2011); WBC All-Star Five (2011); Ivy League All-Rookie Team (2004)

Casey Laing Lockwood (born 5 November 1985) is an American-New Zealand former basketball player.

== Early life ==
Lockwood's hometown is Ross, California. She attended Marin Catholic High School in Kentfield, California.

== College career ==
From 2003 to 2007, Lockwood played college basketball at Princeton University for the Tigers.

As a freshman in 2003–04, Lockwood played in and started the first 19 games before suffering season-ending torn ACL. She was named to the Ivy League All-Rookie Team after averaging 10.8 points and a team-high 7.9 rebounds in 30.5 minutes per game. She scored a season-high 20 points in first collegiate game against Nebraska.

As a sophomore in 2004–05, Lockwood returned from the ACL injury in January 2005 and played in 15 games to finish the season.

As a junior in 2005–06, Lockwood started all 28 games and scored double digits in eight games with a high of 18 points against Colgate on 3 December 2005.

As a senior in 2006–07, Lockwood was named honorable mention All-Ivy League. She was one of two Tigers to start all 28 games and she scored a career-best 22 points at Cornell on 16 February 2007.

=== Princeton statistics ===
Legend
GP	Games played	GS	Games started	MPG	Minutes per game
FG%	Field goal percentage	3P%	3-point field goal percentage	FT%	Free throw percentage
RPG	Rebounds per game	APG	Assists per game	SPG	Steals per game
BPG	Blocks per game	PPG	Points per game	**Bold**	Career high

Year	Team	GP	Points	FG%	3P%	FT%	RPG	APG	SPG	BPG	PPG
2003-04	Princeton	19	206	44.4%	29.0%	**75.7%**	**7.9**	1.5	1.1	0.2	**10.8**
2004-05	Princeton	16	88	48.0%	18.8%	76.5%	3.2	0.6	0.5	0.1	5.5
2005-06	Princeton	**28**	211	47.1%	30.4%	60.0%	5.0	1.5	**1.9**	0.1	7.5
2006-07	Princeton	**28**	**293**	**48.9%**	**33.3%**	72.6%	5.6	**1.9**	1.0	**0.3**	10.5
Career		91	798	47.2%	29.5%	71.5%	5.5	1.5	1.2	0.2	8.8

== Professional career ==
After graduating from college, Lockwood moved to Stewart Island in south New Zealand. In 2009, she played for the Southland Pearls at the open nationals tournament in Invercargill. She averaged 23.6 points a game, was named the most valuable women's player and was selected in the tournament team. She subsequently suffered a chronic knee injury that lasted 18 months.

In 2011, Lockwood played for the Otago Gold Rush in the Women's Basketball Championship (WBC). She led the team to the WBC championship and was named WBC Most Valuable Player and WBC All-Star Five.

Lockwood joined the Townsville Fire of the Women's National Basketball League (WNBL) for the 2011–12 season. She averaged 2.8 points and 1.3 rebounds in 12 games. She returned to the Otago Gold Rush in 2012 and then re-joined the Fire for the 2012–13 WNBL season. She averaged 1.7 points and 1.4 rebounds in 11 games in her second WNBL season.

Lockwood joined the Joondalup Wolves of Western Australia's State Basketball League (SBL) for the 2013 season. She helped the Wolves win the SBL championship. After sitting out the 2014 season, she re-joined the Wolves for the 2015 season.

In 2019, Lockwood joined the Sunshine Coast Phoenix of the Queensland Basketball League following a three-year hiatus from competitive basketball. She returned to the Phoenix, now in the NBL1 North, for a five-game stint during the 2023 NBL1 season.

== National team ==
Lockwood played for the New Zealand Tall Ferns at the 2012 FIBA Olympic Qualifying Tournament and the 2013 FIBA Oceania Championship.

== Personal life ==
Lockwood is the daughter of Deborah and Brian Lockwood. She has one brother, Alex.

After graduating from college, Lockwood moved to Stewart Island in south New Zealand with her partner, Kent Centers. There the couple ran a Pāua hatchery. In 2009, Lockwood gained her New Zealand residency. In 2011, she gained New Zealand citizenship.

Lockwood is a musician. She recorded her own original acoustic and folk music while in college.
