= Cooper Land =

American basketball player (born 1988)

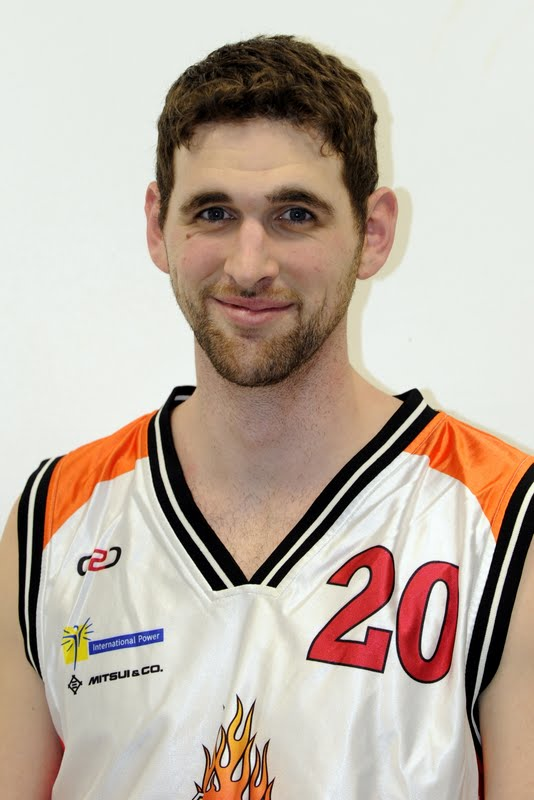
- Land with the Rockingham Flames in 2013

St. Michael's Catholic Academy
- Title: Head coach
- League: TAPPS

Personal information
- Born: November 10, 1988 (age 38) Highland Village, Texas
- Listed height: 205 cm (6 ft 9 in)
- Listed weight: 104 kg (229 lb)

Career information
- High school: Marcus (Flower Mound, Texas)
- College: Wright State (2007–2011)
- NBA draft: 2011: undrafted
- Playing career: 2011–2016
- Position: Power forward / center
- Coaching career: 2013–present

Career history

Playing
- 2011–2012: Asker Aliens
- 2012: VfL Kirchheim Knights
- 2013–2016: Rockingham Flames
- 2014: Rizing Fukuoka

Coaching
- 2013–2014: St. Francis (assistant)
- 2015–2016: St. Francis (associate head coach)
- 2016–2017: St. Edward's (volunteer assistant)
- 2017–2018: Rogers State (assistant)
- 2018–present: St. Michael's Catholic Academy

Career highlights
- 2× SBL MVP (2014, 2016); SBL All-Star Five (2014); All-BLNO First Team (2012); BLNO All-Star (2012)

Cooper Land (born November 10, 1988) is an American former professional basketball player who is most known for his time spent in the State Basketball League (SBL) with the Rockingham Flames. He played college basketball for Wright State University before playing professionally in Norway, Germany, Australia and Japan.

== High school career ==
Land attended Marcus High School in Flower Mound, Texas. As a junior in 2005–06, he averaged ten points and five rebounds per game in helping his team finish with a 20–10 record. As a senior in 2006–07, he averaged 16 points and seven rebounds per game, as his team finished with a 29–7 record and made it to the state's Sweet 16.

== College career ==
Land played four years of college basketball for Wright State between 2007 and 2011. In 33 games as a freshman in 2007–08, he averaged 3.2 points and 2.2 rebounds in 12.8 minutes per game. In 33 games as a sophomore in 2008–09, he averaged 4.2 points and 1.9 rebounds in 13.0 minutes per game. His junior and senior seasons were both interrupted by injury: on February 8, 2010, he tore his ACL in practice and subsequently missed the rest of the 2009–10 season; and in February 2011, he missed time due to another knee injury. In 24 games as a junior, he averaged 5.5 points, 2.9 rebounds and 16.6 minutes, and in 26 games as a senior, he averaged 8.9 points, 3.0 rebounds and 25.7 minutes. On December 30, 2010, he scored a career-high 21 points against Milwaukee.

== Professional career ==
=== Norway and Germany (2011–2012) ===
In August 2011, Land signed his first professional contract, moving to Norway to play for Asker Aliens. He helped Asker reach the BLNO final, where they lost 80–78 to Frøya Basket despite a 15-point effort from Land. He subsequently earned All-BLNO First Team honors. In 23 games for Asker during the 2011–12 season, he averaged 21.4 points, 8.9 rebounds, 1.9 assists and 1.2 steals per game.

In July 2012, Land signed with the German team VfL Kirchheim Knights for the 2012–13 season. On December 27, 2012, he parted ways with Kirchheim after he had a number of poor performances that were linked to a recurring knee injury. In 15 games, he averaged 10.1 points and 2.9 rebounds per game.

=== Australia and Japan (2013–2016) ===
After his stint in Germany, Land moved to Australia to play for the Rockingham Flames in the State Basketball League. He scored 30 points or more in nine games, including a season-high 42 points. In 24 games in 2013, he averaged 27.2 points, 9.6 rebounds, 2.0 assists and 1.2 steals per game.

Land returned to the Flames for the 2014 season and scored 40 points or more in five games, including a career-high 46 points. He subsequently earned SBL MVP honors. In 27 games, he averaged 29.3 points, 10.3 rebounds, 2.4 assists and 1.1 steals per game.

In August 2014, Land signed with Rizing Fukuoka of the Japanese bj league. He left the team in December 2014. In 18 games, he averaged 8.6 points, 4.1 rebounds and 2.7 assists per game.

After leaving Japan, Land returned to Rockingham for the 2015 season. He scored 30 points or more seven times, including a season-high 45 points. In 27 games, he averaged 26.0 points, 11.2 rebounds, 2.7 assists and 1.1 steals per game.

Land returned to the Flames in 2016 for a fourth season. He scored 30 points or more 12 times, including a season-high 45 points. He subsequently earned SBL MVP honors for the second time in three years. In 27 games, he averaged 28.8 points, 10.2 rebounds and 3.1 assists per game.

== Coaching career ==
Land served as Assistant Coach at NAIA Division II's University of St. Francis in 2013–14 and Associate head coach in 2015–16 between playing overseas. In his final season at St. Francis, the Fighting Saints recorded a 28–4 record and No. 1 ranking in NAIA Division II final regular season poll while winning the Chicagoland Collegiate Athletic Conference regular season title.

Land spent 2016–17 as a volunteer assistant at St. Edward's University as the Hilltoppers tallied a 17–15 record while finishing sixth in the conference with a 9–9 league record. At SEU, Land led the development of post players while assisting with film breakdown and game preparation along with scouting and recruiting.

In June 2017, Rogers State men's basketball head coach Justin Barkley announced the hiring of Land as assistant coach.

In 2018, Land became the St. Michael's Catholic Academy basketball coach. He was still in the role as of January 2023.

== Personal ==
Land is the son of Bill and Gayle Land. His father is the play-by-play voice for the San Antonio Spurs. His brother, Taylor, is also a basketball player. In 2012 and 2013, Taylor played for the Mandurah Magic, the Rockingham Flames' number one rival. In 2014, Taylor joined Cooper at the Rockingham Flames and the pair played alongside each other for three straight seasons.

Land is a Christian. In the summer of 2012, he traveled to Israel with Athletes in Action, a Christian organization with the goal to build spiritual movements through sport. He visited over 40 biblical sights and participated in a tournament in Palestine.
