= Ben Beran =

American basketball player (born 1984)

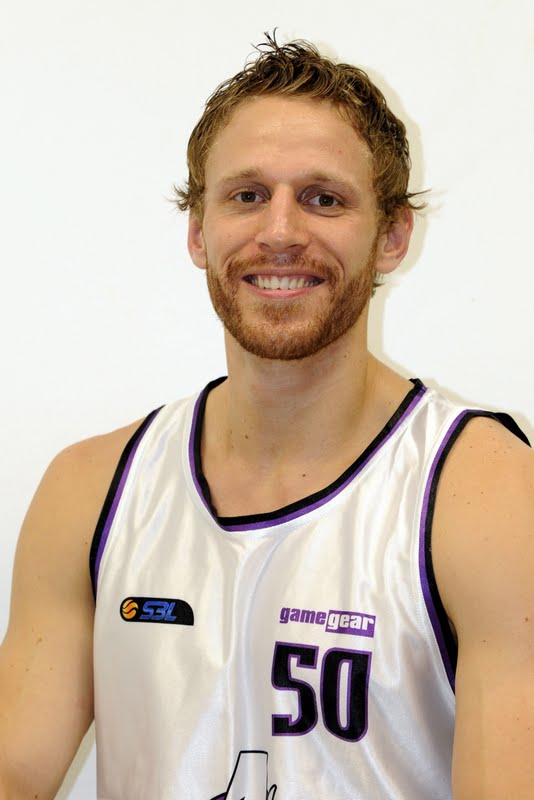
- Beran with the Lakeside Lightning in 2013

Personal information
- Born: October 1, 1984 (age 42) Victor, Iowa, U.S.
- Listed height: 6 ft 7 in (2.01 m)
- Listed weight: 225 lb (102 kg)

Career information
- High school: Hartwick-Ladora-Victor (Victor, Iowa)
- College: South Dakota State (2003–2008)
- NBA draft: 2008: undrafted
- Playing career: 2008–2015
- Position: Forward

Career history
- 2008–2009: USC Heidelberg
- 2010–2013: Lakeside Lightning
- 2013–2015: VfL Kirchheim Knights

Career highlights
- SBL champion (2013); SBL Most Valuable Player (2013); SBL All-Star Five (2013); NCC Freshman of the Year (2004)

Benjamin Beran (born October 1, 1984) is an American former professional basketball player. He played college basketball for the South Dakota State Jackrabbits before playing professionally in Germany and Australia. He was named Most Valuable Player of the State Basketball League (SBL) in 2013 and helped the Lakeside Lightning win the SBL championship the same year.

== Early life ==
Beran was born in Victor, Iowa, where he attended Hartwick-Ladora-Victor High School. He averaged 18.5 points and 15.3 rebounds as a senior and finished his high school career with 1,359 points and 1,082 rebounds alongside three first-team all-conference selections. He led the Warriors to their first state tournament appearance in 30 years and earned two consecutive Iowa Newspaper Association All-State honors. He also played football, track and baseball.

== College career ==
As a freshman at South Dakota State in 2003–04, Beran played in all 34 games and made one start while averaging 5.8 points, 3.9 rebounds and 15.1 minutes per game. He scored season-high 18 points against Augustana. He was subsequently named North Central Conference Freshman of the Year.

For the 2004–05 season, the Jackrabbits entered the NCAA Division I for the first time. As a sophomore, Beran was South Dakota State's leading scorer with 13.6 points per game. He started all 28 games and also averaged 5.9 rebounds per game. In January 2005, he had back-to-back double-doubles with 25 points and 10 rebounds against UMKC and 27 points and 13 rebounds against Morningside.

As a junior in 2005–06, Beran started 28 of the team's 29 games and averaged 12.1 points and 5.4 rebounds per game. He led the team in scoring seven times, including a season-high 25 points against Kentucky in the season opener.

After sitting out the 2006–07 season, Beran returned to the Jackrabbits for his senior season in 2007–08. He became the 38th player in SDSU men's basketball history to reach 1,000 career points. He played in all 29 games and started all but one, averaging 12.3 points, 4.4 rebounds and 26.3 minutes per game. He had 25 points on 11-of-16 shooting in 37 minutes in an overtime loss to Cal State-Bakersfield on December 28, 2007.

Beran finished his career as the 11th all-time leading scorer at South Dakota State with 1,285 career points. His total ranked 15th all time in 2013 and 16th all time in 2015.

After graduating from South Dakota State, Beran toured with Athletes in Action in Europe in May and June 2008.

== Professional career ==
=== USC Heidelberg (2008–2009) ===
In July 2008, Beran signed a contract to play professionally in Germany with USC Heidelberg of the ProA. While sidelined with a knee injury in February 2009, he served as acting head coach for one game. In 26 games during the 2008–09 season, he averaged 16.3 points, 7.5 rebounds, 1.5 assists and 1.1 steals per game.

USC Heidelberg offered Beran a new contract for the 2009–10 season, but he declined it for personal reasons.

=== Lakeside Lightning (2010–2013) ===
After touring with Athletes in Action in Western Australia in December 2009, Beran joined the Lakeside Lightning of the State Basketball League (SBL) for the 2010 season. He scored over 40 points four times, including a 50-point game on July 2 against the Rockingham Flames. He was twice named player of the week and earned player of the month for May. He helped the Lightning reach the SBL Grand Final after averaging 35 points in the semi-final series against the Perth Redbacks. The Lightning lost to the Willetton Tigers in the grand final, with Beran scoring 19 points. In 31 games, he averaged 26.65 points, 7.32 rebounds and 1.97 assists per game.

Beran returned to the Lightning in 2011 and opened the season with 29 points and 21 rebounds against the Kalamunda Eastern Suns. He won the round two player of the week award after recording two 30-point games. He was sidelined early in the season with a back injury. He scored 30 points or more five times, including a 52-point game on July 29 in the quarter-finals against the East Perth Eagles. In 23 games, he averaged 23.78 points, 8.52 rebounds and 1.7 assists per game.

With the Lightning in 2012, Beran was limited to 17 regular-season games, playing just one game in May and one game in July. He scored over 30 points twice and averaged 20.86 points, 7.45 rebounds and 2.0 assists in 22 games.

Beran returned to the Lightning for the 2013 season and won the round seven player of the week award. He scored 30 points or more 10 times and had two games with 20 rebounds. He helped the Lightning reach the grand final, where they defeated the Wanneroo Wolves to win the SBL championship. Beran was hampered by a corked thigh in the third quarter but still contributed 16 points and eight rebounds while shooting 5-of-19 from the field. For the season, he was named the SBL Most Valuable Player and earned SBL All-Star Five honors. In 31 games, he averaged 25.06 points, 9.26 rebounds and 2.65 assists per game.

=== VfL Kirchheim Knights (2013–2015) ===
In September 2013, Beran signed with VfL Kirchheim Knights of the German ProA for the 2013–14 season. While the team missed the playoffs, Beran was the top performer for the Knights, averaging 14.4 points and almost six rebounds in over 30 minutes per game. He was top 20 in the ProA efficiency rating.

In June 2014, Beran re-signed with Kirchheim for the 2014–15 season. He maintained similar averages in his second season as a Knight, with 15 points and six rebounds in just under 30 minutes per game. He played all 60 games over the two seasons.

In July 2015, Beran announced his retirement from basketball.

== Personal life ==
Beran is the son of Bill and Ruth Beran, and has one brother and two sisters. His brother, Matt, played basketball at Truman State University.

Beran and his wife, Jessica, had their first child in 2014.

After retiring from basketball, Beran returned to the United States to work in the artificial fertilizer industry.
