= Damian Matacz =

Australian basketball player (born 1979)

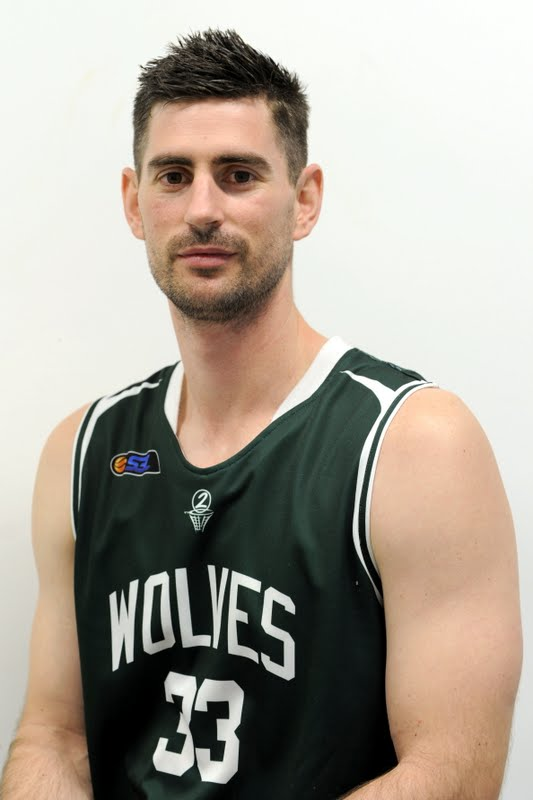
- Matacz with the Wanneroo Wolves in 2013

Personal information
- Born: 28 February 1979 (age 47) Perth, Western Australia
- Listed height: 204 cm (6 ft 8 in)
- Listed weight: 110 kg (243 lb)

Career information
- High school: Greenville (Greenville, Michigan)
- College: Northern Michigan (1998–2002)
- NBA draft: 2002: undrafted
- Playing career: 1999–2019
- Position: Power forward / Centre

Career history
- 1999: Wanneroo Wolves
- 2001–2009: Wanneroo Wolves
- 2002–2003: Perth Wildcats
- 2004: Canterbury Rams
- 2004–2005: UCC Demons
- 2005–2006: TB Weiden
- 2006: BBC Martigny-Ovronnaz
- 2007: Singapore Slingers
- 2011–2013: Wanneroo Wolves
- 2015–2019: Joondalup Wolves

Career highlights
- 2× SBL champion (2011, 2015); SBL MVP (2012); SBL All-Star Five (2012); Irish Superleague champion (2005); GLIAC North Division all-conference first team (2002); GLIAC North Division all-conference second team (2001)

Damian Richard Matacz (born 28 February 1979) is an Australian former professional basketball player. He played four seasons of college basketball in the United States for Northern Michigan University and played 18 seasons for the Joondalup Wolves in the State Basketball League (SBL). He won two SBL championships in 2011 and 2015 and was named the SBL Most Valuable Player in 2012. He also had two short stints in the National Basketball League (NBL) and played in New Zealand, Ireland, Germany and Switzerland. He represented the Irish national team in 2008.

== Early life ==
Matacz was born and raised in Perth, Western Australia, and moved to the United States in the mid-1990s to attend Greenville High School in Greenville, Michigan. At Greenville, he earned all-conference honours with the basketball team in 1997.

== College career ==
In 1998, Matacz enrolled at Northern Michigan University and joined the Wildcats men's basketball program. He played four seasons for the Wildcats and served as co-captain as a junior and senior. He was the team's Newcomer of the Year in 1999 and MVP in 2001 and 2002. He was also named GLIAC North Division all-conference second team in 2001 and all-conference first team in 2002. In 113 career games, he recorded 1,355 points (12.0 pg) and 715 rebounds (6.3 pg). At Northern Michigan, he majored in finance.

== Professional career ==
=== Wanneroo/Joondalup Wolves ===
Matacz debuted for the Wanneroo Wolves of the State Basketball League (SBL) in 1999. He returned to the Wolves in 2001 and went on to play every year until 2009, winning Club MVP in 2001, 2003, 2006 and 2007.

In 2011, Matacz helped the Wolves win the SBL championship with an 88–83 win over the Perry Lakes Hawks in the grand final, where he scored 15 points. In 2012, he was named the SBL Most Valuable Player. Following the 2013 season, he retired from the SBL. He won his sixth and final Club MVP in 2013.

Matacz came out of retirement in 2015. He helped the Wolves win the 2015 SBL championship with a 105–75 win over the South West Slammers in the grand final. He played his 300th SBL game in 2016 and his 350th SBL game in 2018.

In September 2019, Matacz retired from the SBL for the second and final time. In 385 games, he scored 6,412 points.

=== Australian NBL, New Zealand, and Europe ===
Matacz was a member of the Perth Wildcats of the National Basketball League (NBL) during the 2002–03 season. He played two games for the Wildcats, including 20 seconds on 12 October against the Wollongong Hawks and just under six minutes on 18 January against the Canberra Cannons. In the second game, he had six points, two rebounds and one assist.

Matacz played for the Canterbury Rams of the New Zealand NBL during the 2004 season. In 18 games, he averaged 9.8 points and 6.6 rebounds per game.

For the 2004–05 season, Matacz moved to Ireland to play for UCC Demons of the Irish Superleague. He helped Demons win the championship and averaged 21 points, 11.9 rebounds, 1.8 blocks and 1.7 assists in 22 games.

For the 2005–06 season, Matacz moved to Germany to play for TB Weiden of the 2. Basketball Bundesliga. In 13 games for Weiden, he averaged 12.4 points and 6.5 rebounds per game. He finished the season with a two-game stint in Switzerland with BBC Martigny-Ovronnaz.

Matacz initially signed with Spanish team Rhino's Xiria de Carballo for the 2007–08 season, but later joined the Singapore Slingers of the Australian NBL. He played two games for the Slingers to start the 2007–08 NBL season, including in Singapore on 19 September against the Melbourne Tigers and in Perth against the Wildcats on 23 September.

== National team career ==
Matacz represented the Irish national team in 2008, playing in the Emerald Hoops International Series in August and the FIBA EuroBasket 2009 Division B qualifiers in September.

In July 2010, Matacz played for a team representing Australia at the William Jones Cup in Taipei. The team went 0–6 at the tournament.

== Personal life ==
Matacz is the son of Karl and Anne Matacz, and he has a brother, Lucas, and a sister, Rochelle.

Matacz holds an Irish passport.
