= Giro-Live Ballers Osnabrück =

- Founded: 1967
- Dissolved: 2011
- History: List: VfL Osnabrück (1967–1969) GSV Osnabrück (1995–1996) SC Ballers (2005–2006) P4two Ballers (2006–2009) GiroLive-Ballers Osnabrück (2009–2011)
- Arena: KiKxxlarena
- Capacity: 2,128
- Location: Osnabrück, Lower Saxony, Germany
- Championships: 1 German Championship; 1 German Cup
Home	Away

GiroLive-Ballers Osnabrück was a basketball club based in Osnabrück, Lower Saxony, Germany. The team played in Germany's second division Pro A until March 2011, when the club's licence was detracted by the league. Their home games were played at KiKxxlarena.

== Notable players ==
- (Canada) Jevohn Shepherd
- (Australia) Ty Harrelson
- (Germany) Steve Wachalski

== See also ==
- GiroLive Panthers Osnabrück
