= Ty Harrelson =

American-Australian basketball player

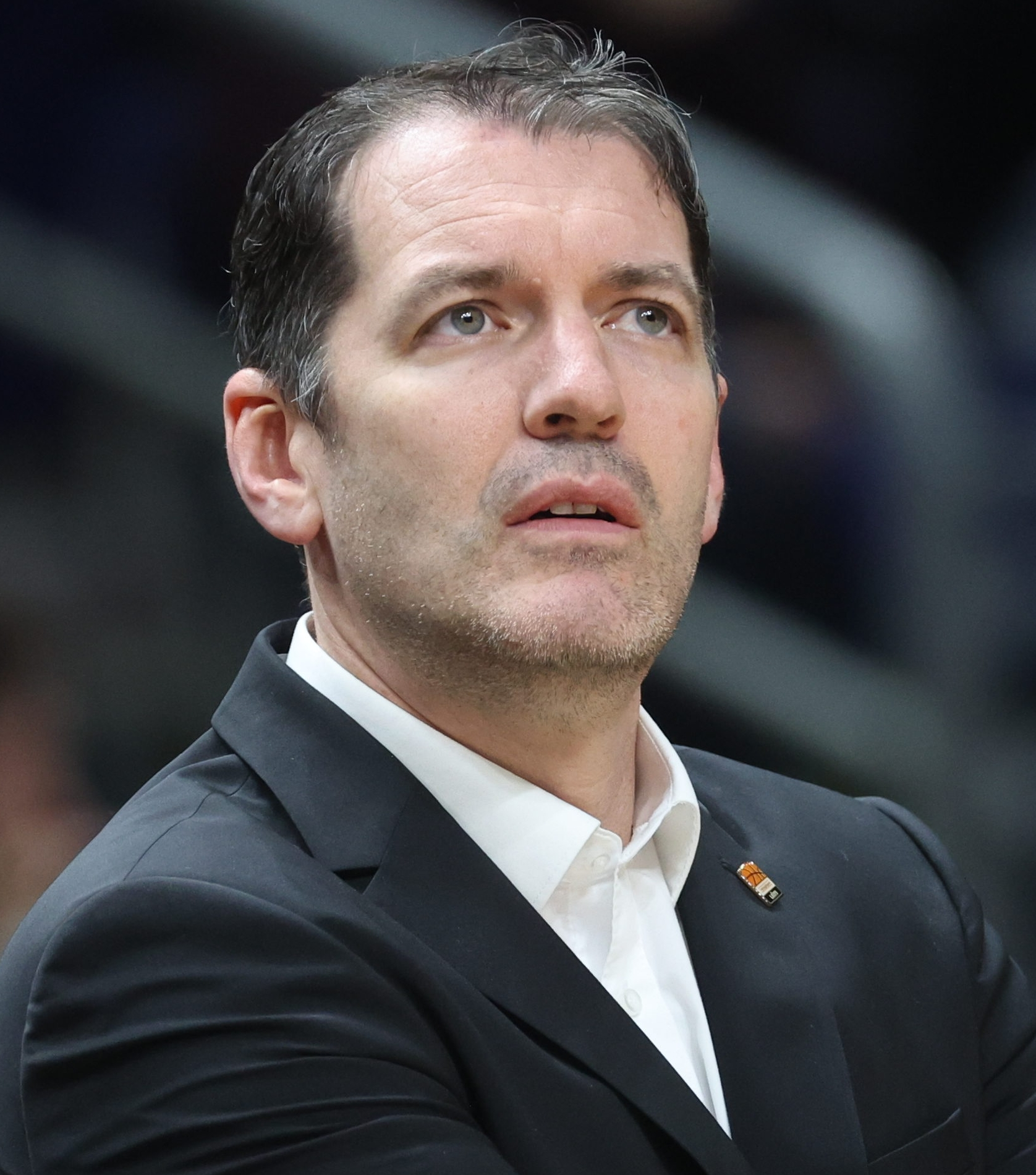
- Harrelson in 2024

Ratiopharm Ulm
- Title: Head coach
- League: Basketball Bundesliga; EuroCup

Personal information
- Born: September 22, 1980 (age 46) Houston, Texas
- Listed height: 6 ft 4 in (1.93 m)

Career information
- High school: Sonora (Sonora, Texas); Rider (Wichita Falls, Texas)
- College: Collin County CC (1999–2000); Cameron (2000–2001); Wayland Baptist (2001–2003)
- NBA draft: 2003: undrafted
- Playing career: 2003–2017, 2022
- Position: Shooting guard / point guard
- Coaching career: 2012–present

Career history

Playing
- 2003–2005: Fresno Heat Wave
- 2005–2006: TV Langen
- 2006–2008: BBC Bayreuth
- 2008: Kataja
- 2008: Falco KC Szombathely
- 2009–2010: Giro-Live Ballers Osnabrück
- 2011: Cockburn Cougars
- 2012: Goldfields Giants
- 2013–2015: South West Slammers
- 2017: South West Slammers
- 2022: TV Langen

Coaching
- 2012: Goldfields Giants (assistant)
- 2013–2015: South West Slammers
- 2015–2021: Wayland Baptist
- 2021–2022: TV Langen
- 2022–2024: SC Rasta Vechta
- 2024–present: Ratiopharm Ulm

Career highlights
- As player: 3× SBL All-Star Five (2011–2013); First-team NAIA All-American (2003); First-team All-SAC (2003); Third-team All-SAC (2002); As coach: German ProA champion (2023); 2× SBL All-Star Game head coach (2014, 2015)

Ty Gary Harrelson (born September 22, 1980) is an American-Australian basketball coach and former player. He played two years of college basketball for Wayland Baptist before playing the majority of his career in Germany and Australia. He is the current head coach of Ratiopharm Ulm of the Basketball Bundesliga (BBL) and the EuroCup.

== High school and college career ==
Harrelson grew up as the son of two college basketball players. He split his high school career at Sonora High School and S. H. Rider High School, finishing with 2,786 career points, which at the time put him 18th on the all-time Texas scoring list.

Harrelson played his freshman college season at Collin County Community College. He spent his sophomore season in the Lone Star Conference at Cameron University before transferring to Wayland Baptist University. In 2001–02, Harrelson helped Wayland Baptist return to the NAIA National Championships for the first time in a decade. In 2002–03, the team posted another 20-win season. Harrelson earned All-Sooner Athletic Conference honors both seasons and was voted Wayland's first-ever NAIA First-Team All-American as a senior. For his two-season WBU career, he scored 1,111 points, tying him for 28th on the Pioneers' all-time points list. As of 2013, Harrelson still held school records for highest assist average in a season (6.8), most assists in a game (15), and best free-throw percentage in a season (88.8).

== Professional career ==
After leaving college, Harrelson had a pre-season stint in Italy with FuturVirtus Castelmaggiore. He played for the Fresno Heat Wave of the ABA in 2003–04 and 2004–05.

In 2005, Harrelson joined German team TV Langen. During the 2005–06 season, he led the 2. Basketball Bundesliga in assists with 5.9 per contest. He played for BBC Bayreuth in the 2. Basketball Bundesliga in 2006–07 and 2007–08.

For the 2008–09 season, Harrelson joined Finnish team Kataja. After four games, he joined Hungarian team Falco KC Szombathely. He left Falco in November 2008 after a further four games.

Harrelson returned to Germany for the 2009–10 season and played with Giro-Live Ballers Osnabrück.

In December 2010, Harrelson signed with the Cockburn Cougars of the State Basketball League (SBL) in Australia. He was named in the SBL All-Star Five for the 2011 season.

In December 2011, Harrelson signed with the Goldfields Giants for the 2012 SBL season. He served in a dual player-assistant coach role. He was named in the SBL All-Star Five for the second straight year.

In October 2012, Harrelson signed a three-year deal with the South West Slammers to be player-coach. He was named in the SBL All-Star Five for the third straight year in 2013. In October 2014, he committed to the Slammers for the 2015 season after rejecting an offer from the Goldfields Giants. He guided the Slammers to the 2015 SBL Grand Final, where they were defeated 105–75 by the Joondalup Wolves.

In July 2017, Harrelson had a three-game stint with the Slammers.

In April 2022, Harrelson had a three-game stint with TV Langen.

== Coaching career ==
On July 11, 2015, Harrelson was hired as head coach of the Wayland Baptist men's basketball program. Under his guidance, the team reached the NAIA national tournament four times. He left the program in August 2021.

In December 2021, Harrelson was named head coach of TV Langen of the German Regionalliga.

On June 1, 2022, Harrelson was appointed head coach of SC Rasta Vechta of the German second division, ProA. In June 2023, he led Vechta to the ProA championship after entering the playoffs as the No. 1 seed. By claiming the championship, the team earned promotion to the German top division, Basketball Bundesliga. As a newcomer to the league in the 2023–24 season, Harrelson and his Vechta outfit reached the play-off quarter final stages. He moved to fellow Bundesliga side Ratiopharm Ulm prior to the 2024–25 campaign. He led the Ulm squad to the 2025 Bundesliga finals, where they fell short to FC Bayern München. Noa Essengue, one of Harrelson's key players, left to the United States during the finals to attend the NBA Draft in which he was picked at number 12 overall by the Chicago Bulls. The same year, a second of Harrelson's players at Ulm, Ben Saraf, was drafted in the first round. In 2025, Harrelson was a member of Denver Nuggets’ staff in the NBA Summer League.

== Personal life ==
Harrelson obtained Australian citizenship in 2014.
