= Quinn McDowell =

American basketball player and coach (born 1990)

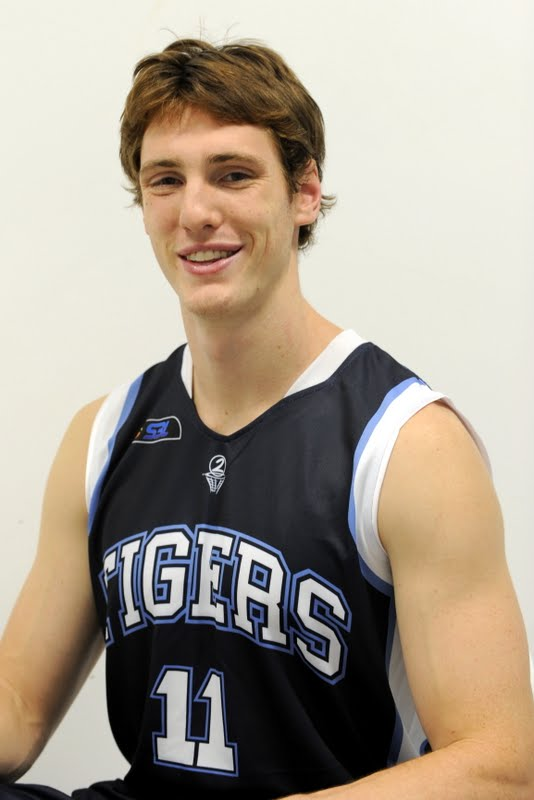
- McDowell with the Willetton Tigers in 2013

Baylor Red Raiders
- Title: Head coach
- League: TSSAA

Personal information
- Born: January 13, 1990 (age 36) Mason, Ohio, U.S.
- Listed height: 6 ft 4 in (1.93 m)
- Listed weight: 205 lb (93 kg)

Career information
- High school: Moeller (Cincinnati, Ohio)
- College: William & Mary (2008–2012)
- NBA draft: 2012: undrafted
- Playing career: 2013–2016
- Position: Shooting guard / small forward
- Coaching career: 2016–present

Career history

Playing
- 2013: Willetton Tigers
- 2013–2014: Springfield Armor
- 2014: Willetton Tigers
- 2014–2015: Palencia
- 2015–2016: VEF Rīga

Coaching
- 2016–2018: Virginia Wesleyan (assistant)
- 2018–2019: Taylor (associate HC)
- 2019–2022: Lehigh (assistant)
- 2022–2024: Longwood (assistant)
- 2024–present: Baylor School

Career highlights
- Copa Príncipe champion (2015); SBL scoring champion (2014); SBL All-Star Five (2013); 2× Third-team All-CAA (2010, 2011); CAA All-Rookie Team (2009)

Quinn Thomas McDowell (born January 13, 1990) is an American former professional basketball player and current head coach of the Baylor School's boys' team in Chattanooga, Tennessee, a position he has held since 2024.

== Professional career ==
In January 2013, McDowell signed with the Willetton Tigers in Australia for the 2013 State Basketball League season. He was named in the SBL All-Star Five and averaged 29.4 points, 8.2 rebounds, 3.5 assists and 1.0 steals in 26 games.

In November 2013, McDowell joined the Springfield Armor of the NBA Development League. He was waived on February 19, 2014, after averaging 3.5 points and 2.1 rebounds in 22 games. He subsequently returned to Australia and re-joined the Willetton Tigers for the 2014 SBL season. He averaged a league-leading 30.1 points per game to go with 10.3 rebounds, 3.9 assists and 1.1 steals in 23 games.

On September 4, 2014, McDowell signed with Palencia Baloncesto for the 2014–15 LEB Oro season. On March 9, 2015, he injured himself at training and subsequently missed six weeks of action. In 25 games for Palencia, he averaged 11.6 points, 3.9 rebounds and 1.2 assists per game.

On July 24, 2015, McDowell signed with VEF Rīga for the 2015–16 Latvian Basketball League season. He left the team in January 2016. In 11 league games for Rīga, he averaged 7.0 points, 2.2 rebounds and 1.5 assists per game. He also appeared in 16 VTB United League games, averaging 5.6 points and 2.6 rebounds per game.

== Coaching career ==
In August 2016, McDowell was appointed assistant coach of the Virginia Wesleyan Marlins men's basketball team, effectively ending his playing career. Following the 2017–18 season, he accepted a position as the associate head coach at Taylor University in Upland, Indiana. In May 2019, he was appointed assistant coach of the Lehigh Mountain Hawks men's basketball team. Three years later, he joined the coaching staff at Longwood University. He spent two seasons at Longwood where he helped the Lancers win 20 games each season. In 2024, he took the head coaching job of the boys' varsity team at the Baylor School in Chattanooga, Tennessee.
