= Jevohn Shepherd =

Canadian basketball player (born 1986)

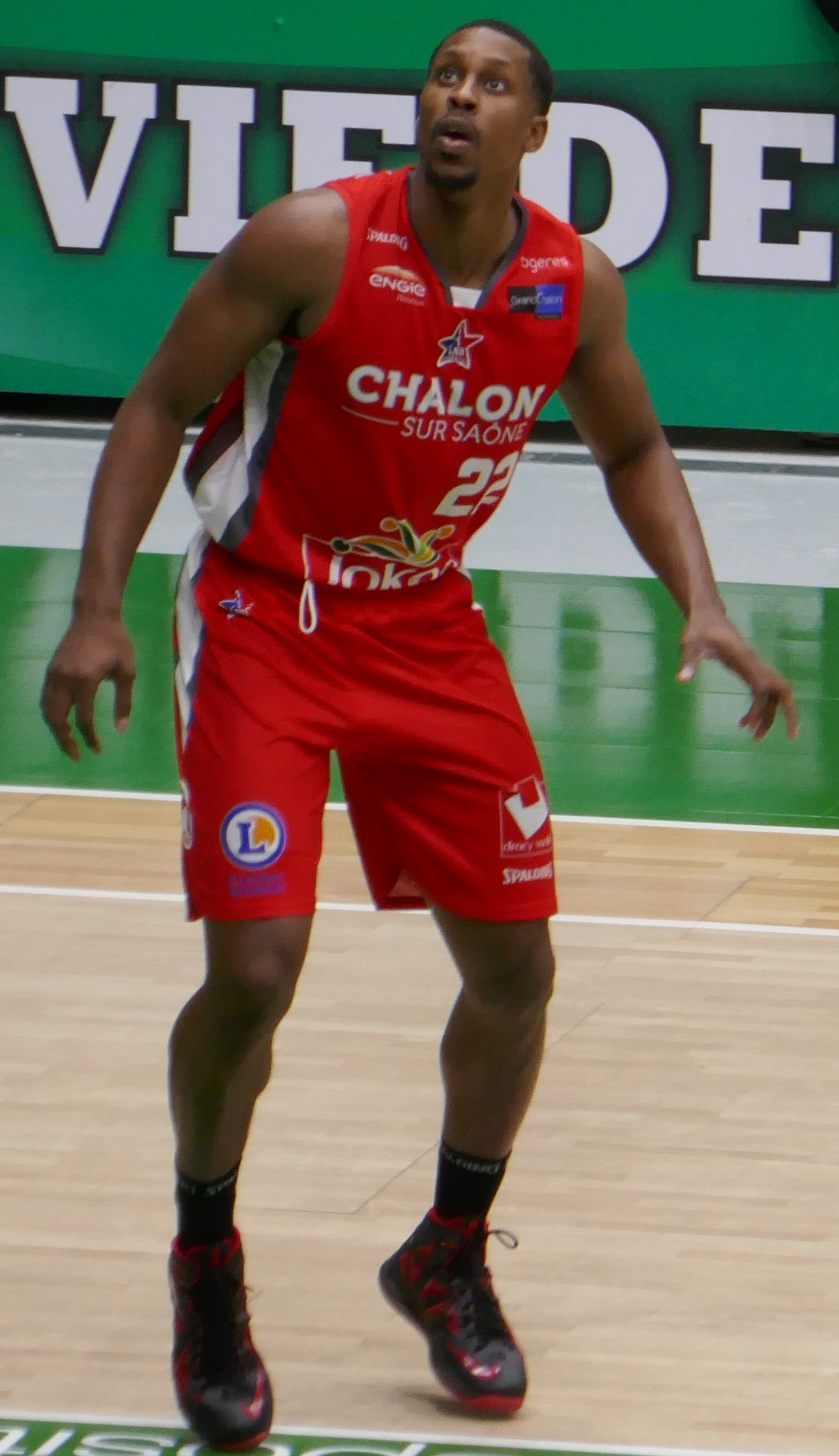
- Shepherd playing for Chalon in 2017

Ottawa Blackjacks
- Title: General manager
- League: CEBL

Personal information
- Born: April 8, 1986 (age 40) Toronto, Ontario
- Listed height: 198 cm (6 ft 6 in)
- Listed weight: 98 kg (216 lb)

Career information
- High school: West Hill Collegiate Institute (Toronto, Ontario)
- College: Michigan (2005–2009)
- NBA draft: 2009: undrafted
- Playing career: 2009–2019
- Position: Small forward
- Number: 4, 11, 13, 15, 22

Career history
- 2009–2010: Halifax Rainmen
- 2010–2011: GiroLive-Ballers Osnabrück
- 2011: Skyliners Frankfurt
- 2011–2012: ZZ Leiden
- 2012–2013: Steaua București
- 2013–2014: Fulgor Omegna
- 2014–2015: Barcellona
- 2015: Varese
- 2015–2016: Victoria Libertas Pesaro
- 2016–2017: Spirou Charleroi
- 2017–2018: Elan Chalon
- 2018: SLUC Nancy
- 2018–2019: Paris
- 2019: Lille Métropole BC

Career highlights
- Dutch Cup winner (2012); DBL All-Star (2012)

Jevohn Shepherd (born April 8, 1986) is a Canadian basketball executive who is the vice-president of basketball operations and general manager for the Ottawa Blackjacks of the Canadian Elite Basketball League (CEBL). He is a former professional basketball player, playing the majority of his career overseas. Shepherd played college basketball for the Michigan Wolverines, and was a longtime member of the Canadian men's national basketball team. He also serves as a colour commentator for the Toronto Raptors on TSN 1050.

== High school ==
Shepherd attended West Hill Collegiate Institute and Don Valley Junior High School in Toronto.

== College career ==
Shepherd played for Michigan in the Big Ten Conference of the NCAA Division I from 2005 to 2009. As a senior, he captained the team to a second-round appearance in the 2009 NCAA Men's Division I Basketball Tournament, the school's first appearance in the tournament in over a decade.

== Professional career ==
After graduating in 2009, Shepherd signed with the Halifax Rainmen of the Premier Basketball League. He averaged 8.5 points per game in eleven games for the Rainmen.

Following the season, Shepherd signed with German second-tier team Giro-Live Ballers Osnabrück. In March 2011 he signed with Skyliners Frankfurt in Germany where he averaged 4.7 points and 2.1 rebounds in 15 games.

On July 22, 2011, Shepherd signed for Zorg en Zekerheid Leiden in the Dutch Basketball League (DBL).

In August 2014, he signed with Basket Barcellona of the Italian second division.

The next season, Shepherd signed with Italian first division side OpenjobMetis Varese for 2015–16.

On August 11, 2016, Shepherd signed with Spirou Charleroi of the Belgian Basketball League.

== International career ==
Shepherd has represented Canada at various levels of competition. He first played with a Canadian squad at the 2005 and 2007 World University Games, helping the team to a surprise bronze medal in the latter competition. He was called to the senior national team for the first time at the 2010 FIBA World Championship. Shepherd concluded his tenure with the Canadian men's national team at the 2017 FIBA AmeriCup.

== Post-playing career ==
On November 23, 2020, Shepherd signed as general manager of the Ottawa BlackJacks of the Canadian Elite Basketball League (CEBL).
