= Steve Wachalski =

German basketball player (born 1983)

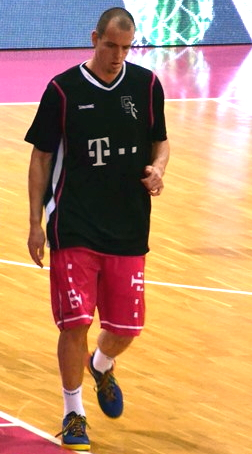

Free Agent
- Position: Power forward

Personal information
- Born: 5 February 1983 (age 42) Köthen (Anhalt), East Germany
- Listed height: 6 ft 8 in (2.03 m)
- Listed weight: 212 lb (96 kg)

Career information
- Playing career: 2003–present

Career history
- 2003–2010: Giro-Live Ballers Osnabrück
- 2010–2011: Bayreuth
- 2011–2013: Mitteldeutscher
- 2013–2015: Telekom Bonn
- 2015–2019: Medi Bayreuth

Steve Wachalski (born 5 February 1983) is a German professional basketball player, who lastly played for Medi Bayreuth of the German Basketball League. He previously played for Telekom Baskets Bonn.
