= 2014 State Basketball League season =

- League: State Basketball League
- Sport: Basketball
- Duration: 14 March – 26 July (Regular season); 1 August – 30 August (Finals)
- Games: 26 (men); 22 (women)
- Teams: 14 (men); 12 (women)

Regular season
- Minor premiers: M: Geraldton Buccaneers; W: Rockingham Flames
- Season MVP: M: Cooper Land (Flames); W: Sami Whitcomb (Flames)
- Top scorer: M: Quinn McDowell (Tigers); W: Sami Whitcomb (Flames)

Finals
- Champions: M: East Perth Eagles; W: Rockingham Flames
- Runners-up: M: Geraldton Buccaneers; W: Lakeside Lightning
- Grand Final MVP: M: Joe-Alan Tupaea (Eagles); W: Sami Whitcomb (Flames)

SBL seasons
- ← 2013 2015 →

The 2014 State Basketball League season was the 26th season of the State Basketball League (SBL). The regular season began on Friday 14 March and ended on Saturday 26 July. The finals began on Friday 1 August and concluded with the women's grand final on Friday 29 August and the men's grand final on Saturday 30 August.

== Pre-season ==
The 2014 SBL Pre-Season Blitz was held at the WA Basketball Centre between Friday 28 February and Sunday 2 March.

== Regular season ==
The regular season began on Friday 14 March and ended on Saturday 26 July after 20 rounds of competition.

=== Standings ===
Men's ladder

Pos
Pos	Team	W	L
1	Geraldton Buccaneers	19	7
2	Rockingham Flames	17	9
3	Perth Redbacks	17	9
4	Lakeside Lightning	16	10
5	Stirling Senators	16	10
6	Mandurah Magic	15	11
7	East Perth Eagles	14	12
8	South West Slammers	14	12
9	Joondalup Wolves	14	12
10	Perry Lakes Hawks	11	15
11	Cockburn Cougars	10	16
12	Willetton Tigers	8	18
13	Kalamunda Eastern Suns	6	20
14	Goldfields Giants	5	21

Women's ladder

Pos
Pos	Team	W	L
1	Rockingham Flames	20	2
2	Lakeside Lightning	19	3
3	Joondalup Wolves	15	7
4	Kalamunda Eastern Suns	14	8
5	Cockburn Cougars	13	9
6	Stirling Senators	12	10
7	Mandurah Magic	12	10
8	Willetton Tigers	10	12
9	South West Slammers	7	15
10	Perry Lakes Hawks	6	16
11	East Perth Eagles	2	20
12	Perth Redbacks	2	20

== Finals ==
The finals began on Friday 1 August and consisted of three rounds. The finals concluded with the women's grand final on Friday 29 August and the men's grand final on Saturday 30 August.

=== Men's bracket ===
Quarter-finals
1	Geraldton Buccaneers	99	93	X
8	South West Slammers	88	92	X
4	Lakeside Lightning	94	112	150
5	Stirling Senators	105	99	144
2	Rockingham Flames	91	81	81
7	East Perth Eagles	102	78	92
3	Perth Redbacks	114	116	X
6	Mandurah Magic	91	94	X

Semi-finals
1	Geraldton Buccaneers	108	96	X
4	Lakeside Lightning	102	86	X
7	East Perth Eagles	106	105	X
3	Perth Redbacks	98	94	X

Grand final
Geraldton Buccaneers	83	X	X
East Perth Eagles	99	X	X

==== Grand Final summary ====
30 August 2014
7:30 pm

Box score
Report

Geraldton Buccaneers 83, East Perth Eagles 99
Pts: Carter Cook 26; Rebs: Mathew Wundenberg 10; Asts: Carter Cook 4	Pts: Tom Jervis 22; Rebs: Tom Jervis 19; Asts: Joe-Alan Tupaea 7
East Perth wins SBL Championship

WA Basketball Centre, Floreat
MVP: Joe-Alan Tupaea (Eagles)

=== Women's bracket ===
Quarter-finals
1	Rockingham Flames	98	89	X
8	Willetton Tigers	84	70	X
4	Kalamunda Eastern Suns	68	84	72
5	Cockburn Cougars	73	73	62
2	Lakeside Lightning	69	86	X
7	Mandurah Magic	56	73	X
3	Joondalup Wolves	74	70	X
6	Stirling Senators	71	58	X

Semi-finals
1	Rockingham Flames	95	84	X
4	Kalamunda Eastern Suns	88	64	X
2	Lakeside Lightning	80	79	X
3	Joondalup Wolves	77	66	X

Grand final
Rockingham Flames	80	X	X
Lakeside Lightning	75	X	X

==== Grand Final summary ====
29 August 2014
7:30 pm

Box score
Report

Rockingham Flames 80, Lakeside Lightning 75
Pts: Sami Whitcomb 32; Rebs: Darcee Garbin 10; Asts: Kaye Tucker 5	Pts: Kari Pickens 25; Rebs: Stoneking, Pickens 8 each Asts: Kari Pickens 5
Rockingham wins SBL Championship

WA Basketball Centre, Floreat
MVP: Sami Whitcomb (Flames)

== All-Star game ==
A men's SBL All-Star game took place at the Eaton Recreation Centre on Sunday 7 September, marking the first North v South SBL All-Star event in over a decade.

=== Rosters ===
South All-Stars
Pos	Player	Team
C	Jarrad Prue	Lakeside Lightning
G	Taylor Land	Rockingham Flames
F/C	Clive Weeden	South West Slammers
F	Gavin Field	Cockburn Cougars
G	Ty Harrelson	South West Slammers
F/C	Taylor Mullenax	Mandurah Magic
G	Ryan Godfrey	Rockingham Flames
F	Nic Cody	Willetton Tigers
G	Chris Sofoulis	Lakeside Lightning
G	Damien Scott	Cockburn Cougars
Head coach: Ty Harrelson (South West Slammers)

North All-Stars
Pos	Player	Team
G/F	Bennie Lewis	Geraldton Buccaneers
F	Adhar Mayen	Kalamunda Eastern Suns
F/C	Dennis Tawhiti	Perth Redbacks
G/F	Carter Cook	Geraldton Buccaneers
G	Kyle Armour	East Perth Eagles
F	Josh Garlepp	Perry Lakes Hawks
F	Ben Purser	Perry Lakes Hawks
G	Joel Wagner	Perth Redbacks
G	Seb Salinas	Joondalup Wolves
G	Ben Smith	Kalamunda Eastern Suns
Head coach: Nik Lackovic (Perth Redbacks)

=== Game data ===
7 September 2014
5:30 pm

Report

South	107–101	North

Eaton Recreation Centre, Bunbury
MVP: Damien Scott (24 pts)

== Awards ==
=== Player of the Week ===
Round	Men's Player	Team	Women's Player	Team	Ref
1	Daniel Thomas	Mandurah Magic	Casey Mihovilovich	Mandurah Magic	
2	John Dickson	Willetton Tigers	Amy Patton	South West Slammers	
3	Odartey Blankson	Geraldton Buccaneers	Sami Whitcomb	Rockingham Flames	
4	Kyle Armour	East Perth Eagles	Kari Pickens	Lakeside Lightning	
5	Jarrad Prue	Lakeside Lightning	Darcee Garbin	Rockingham Flames	
6	Cooper Land	Rockingham Flames	Sami Whitcomb	Rockingham Flames	
7	Seb Salinas	Joondalup Wolves	Sami Whitcomb	Rockingham Flames	
8	Quinn McDowell	Willetton Tigers	Jennie Rintala	Kalamunda Eastern Suns	
9	Stan Okoye	Perth Redbacks	Sami Whitcomb	Rockingham Flames	
10	Cooper Land	Rockingham Flames	Amy Patton	South West Slammers	
11	Corey Easley	Perry Lakes Hawks	Sami Whitcomb	Rockingham Flames	
12	Duran Blue	Goldfields Giants	Kari Pickens	Lakeside Lightning	
13	Lee Roberts	Perth Redbacks	Darcee Garbin	Rockingham Flames	
14	Aaron Ralph	Geraldton Buccaneers	Lauren Jeffers	South West Slammers	
15	Luke Nevill	Kalamunda Eastern Suns	Alison Schwagmeyer	Kalamunda Eastern Suns	
16	Markus Monroe	South West Slammers	Kari Pickens	Lakeside Lightning	
17	Jordan Wild	Stirling Senators	Kari Pickens	Lakeside Lightning	
18	Seb Salinas	Joondalup Wolves	Gabby O'Sullivan	Perth Redbacks	
19	Adrian Majstrovich	Goldfields Giants	Jacinta Bourne	Rockingham Flames	
20	Damien Scott	Cockburn Cougars	Emily Fielding	Lakeside Lightning	

=== Statistics leaders ===
Category	Men's Player	Team	Stat	Women's Player	Team	Stat
Points per game	Quinn McDowell	Willetton Tigers	30.09	Sami Whitcomb	Rockingham Flames	22.55
Rebounds per game	Jarrad Prue	Lakeside Lightning	24.16	Amy Patton	South West Slammers	12.18
Assists per game	Ty Harrelson	South West Slammers	7.40	Shani Amos	Joondalup Wolves	5.15
Steals per game	Trian Iliadis	Joondalup Wolves	2.0	Chelsea Burns	Joondalup Wolves	3.13
Blocks per game	Caleb Palkert	Lakeside Lightning	2.65	Marita Payne	Cockburn Cougars	3.0
Field goal percentage	Jarrad Prue	Lakeside Lightning	72%	Krystal Stoneking	Lakeside Lightning	59%
3-pt field goal percentage	Quinn McDowell	Willetton Tigers	47.2%	Adrienne Jones	Kalamunda Eastern Suns	45.5%
Free throw percentage	Quinn McDowell	Willetton Tigers	88.5%	Sami Whitcomb	Rockingham Flames	82.4%

=== Regular season ===
The 2014 Basketball WA Annual Awards Night was held on Saturday 6 September at the Perth Convention and Exhibition Centre.

- Men's Most Valuable Player: Cooper Land (Rockingham Flames)
- Women's Most Valuable Player: Sami Whitcomb (Rockingham Flames)
- Men's Coach of the Year: Mark Utley (Rockingham Flames)
- Women's Coach of the Year: Darren Nash (Lakeside Lightning)
- Men's Most Improved Player: Sunday Dech (East Perth Eagles)
- Women's Most Improved Player: Alix Hayward (Perth Redbacks)
- Men's All-Star Five:
  - PG: Kyle Armour (East Perth Eagles)
  - SG: Seb Salinas (Joondalup Wolves)
  - SF: Stan Okoye (Perth Redbacks)
  - PF: Cooper Land (Rockingham Flames)
  - C: Jarrad Prue (Lakeside Lightning)
- Women's All-Star Five:
  - PG: Casey Mihovilovich (Mandurah Magic)
  - SG: Sami Whitcomb (Rockingham Flames)
  - SF: Alison Schwagmeyer (Kalamunda Eastern Suns)
  - PF: Kari Pickens (Lakeside Lightning)
  - C: Marita Payne (Cockburn Cougars)

=== Finals ===
- Men's Grand Final MVP: Joe-Alan Tupaea (East Perth Eagles)
- Women's Grand Final MVP: Sami Whitcomb (Rockingham Flames)
