= 2012 State Basketball League season =

- League: State Basketball League
- Sport: Basketball
- Duration: 16 March – 28 July (Regular season); 3 August – 1 September (Finals)
- Number of games: 26 (men); 22 (women)
- Number of teams: 14 (men); 12 (women)

Regular season
- Minor premiers: M: Wanneroo Wolves; W: Wanneroo Wolves
- Season MVP: M: Damian Matacz (Wolves); W: Emma Cannon (Flames)
- Top scorer: M: Robert Kampman (Tigers); W: Stephanie Jones (Cougars)

Finals
- Champions: M: Cockburn Cougars; W: South West Slammers
- Runners-up: M: East Perth Eagles; W: Rockingham Flames
- Grand Final MVP: M: Jeremiah Wilson (Cougars); W: Kim Sitzmann (Slammers)

SBL seasons
- ← 2011 2013 →

The 2012 State Basketball League season was the 24th season of the State Basketball League (SBL). The regular season began on Friday 16 March and ended on Saturday 28 July. The finals began on Friday 3 August and concluded with the women's grand final on Friday 31 August and the men's grand final on Saturday 1 September.

== Pre-season ==
The 2012 SBL Pre-Season Blitz was held at the WA Basketball Centre between Friday 2 March and Sunday 4 March.

== Regular season ==
The regular season began on Friday 16 March and ended on Saturday 28 July after 20 rounds of competition. An additional round was added in 2012 to lighten the travel load of regional teams.

Due to an ineligible player taking part in Men's SBL qualifying games, the Willetton Tigers were deemed to have forfeited three games that were won across June and July. In rounds thirteen to nineteen, the Tigers suited up a player for a total of seven games and failed to lodge a contract, player registration and proof of citizenship which are all documents required by the league before a player is eligible to play. As a result, they were dropped from a 12–13 record to 9–16 heading into the final round.

Similarly, due to an ineligible player taking part in a Women's SBL qualifying game, the South West Slammers were deemed to have forfeited a round sixteen victory against the Wanneroo Wolves after they suited up a development player but failed to lodge a contract, player registration and proof of citizenship.

=== Standings ===
Men's ladder

Pos
Pos	Team	W	L
1	Wanneroo Wolves	23	3
2	Lakeside Lightning	22	4
3	Cockburn Cougars	17	9
4	East Perth Eagles	16	10
5	Mandurah Magic	16	10
6	Perth Redbacks	15	11
7	Goldfields Giants	13	13
8	Kalamunda Eastern Suns	12	14
9	Geraldton Buccaneers	12	14
10	Perry Lakes Hawks	11	15
11	Willetton Tigers	10	16
12	Stirling Senators	8	18
13	Rockingham Flames	4	22
14	South West Slammers	3	23

Women's ladder

Pos
Pos	Team	W	L
1	Wanneroo Wolves	16	6
2	Willetton Tigers	16	6
3	South West Slammers	15	7
4	Rockingham Flames	15	7
5	Kalamunda Eastern Suns	15	7
6	Perth Redbacks	13	9
7	Lakeside Lightning	12	10
8	East Perth Eagles	10	12
9	Perry Lakes Hawks	9	13
10	Cockburn Cougars	5	17
11	Stirling Senators	4	18
12	Mandurah Magic	2	20

== Finals ==
The finals began on Friday 3 August and consisted of three rounds. The finals concluded with the women's grand final on Friday 31 August and the men's grand final on Saturday 1 September.

=== Men's bracket ===
Quarter-finals
1	Wanneroo Wolves	108	103	X
8	Kalamunda Eastern Suns	99	69	X
4	East Perth Eagles	91	93	94
5	Mandurah Magic	99	90	79
2	Lakeside Lightning	96	90	X
7	Goldfields Giants	82	87	X
3	Cockburn Cougars	106	114	X
6	Perth Redbacks	74	79	X

Semi-finals
1	Wanneroo Wolves	77	67	X
4	East Perth Eagles	82	83	X
2	Lakeside Lightning	91	64	92
3	Cockburn Cougars	98	59	102

Grand final
East Perth Eagles	72	X	X
Cockburn Cougars	105	X	X

==== Grand Final summary ====
1 September 2012
7:30 pm

Box score
Report

Cockburn Cougars 105, East Perth Eagles 72
Pts: Carlwell, Scott 21 each Rebs: Jeremiah Wilson 20; Asts: Grant Davey 8	Pts: Jarrod Balcombe 16; Rebs: Tom Jervis 10; Asts: Drew Williamson 4
Cockburn wins SBL Championship

WA Basketball Centre, Floreat
MVP: Jeremiah Wilson (Cougars)

=== Women's bracket ===
Quarter-finals
1	Wanneroo Wolves	62	73	X
8	East Perth Eagles	39	63	X
4	Rockingham Flames	64	68	88
5	Kalamunda Eastern Suns	73	57	79
2	Willetton Tigers	58	74	62
7	Lakeside Lightning	64	59	54
3	South West Slammers	65	73	X
6	Perth Redbacks	43	48	X

Semi-finals
1	Wanneroo Wolves	66	62	60
4	Rockingham Flames	77	46	67
2	Willetton Tigers	55	52	X
3	South West Slammers	79	61	X

Grand final
Rockingham Flames	48	X	X
South West Slammers	85	X	X

==== Grand Final summary ====
31 August 2012
7:30 pm

Box score
Report

South West Slammers 85, Rockingham Flames 48
Pts: Kim Sitzmann 24; Rebs: Kim Sitzmann 12; Asts: Kara Hargreaves 9	Pts: Emma Cannon 12; Rebs: Kaye Tucker 11; Asts: Kaye Tucker 5
South West wins SBL Championship

WA Basketball Centre, Floreat
MVP: Kim Sitzmann (Slammers)

== Awards ==
=== Statistics leaders ===
Category	Men's Player	Team	Stat	Women's Player	Team	Stat
Points per game	Robert Kampman	Willetton Tigers	24.54	Stephanie Jones	Cockburn Cougars	25.86
Rebounds per game	Jarrad Prue	Lakeside Lightning	19.91	Emma Cannon	Rockingham Flames	15.80
Assists per game	Joel Wagner	Perth Redbacks	9.56	Lauren Jeffers	Stirling Senators	4.85
Steals per game	Chris Dodd	Stirling Senators	2.87	Jacinta Bourne	Rockingham Flames	3.27
Blocks per game	Tom Jervis	East Perth Eagles	3.84	Marita Payne	Perth Redbacks	3.17
Field goal percentage	Jarrad Prue	Lakeside Lightning	71.3%	Brooke Hiddlestone	Perth Redbacks	52.2%
3-pt field goal percentage	Joel Questel	Kalamunda Eastern Suns	44.4%	Holly Coomey	Rockingham Flames	38.2%
Free throw percentage	Robert Kampman	Willetton Tigers	87.7%	Jasmine Hooper	Willetton Tigers	78.2%

=== Regular season ===
The 2012 Basketball WA Annual Awards Night was held on Saturday 15 September at the Rendezvous Hotel.

- Men's Most Valuable Player: Damian Matacz (Wanneroo Wolves)
- Women's Most Valuable Player: Emma Cannon (Rockingham Flames)
- Men's Coach of the Year: Jason Chalk (Mandurah Magic)
- Women's Coach of the Year: Ryan Petrik (Rockingham Flames)
- Men's Most Improved Player: Michael Vigor (Perth Redbacks)
- Women's Most Improved Player: Adrienne Jones (Kalamunda Eastern Suns)
- Men's All-Star Five:
  - PG: Joel Wagner (Perth Redbacks)
  - SG: Luke Payne (Lakeside Lightning)
  - SF: Ty Harrelson (Goldfields Giants)
  - PF: Damian Matacz (Wanneroo Wolves)
  - C: Tom Jervis (East Perth Eagles)
- Women's All-Star Five:
  - PG: Adrienne Jones (Kalamunda Eastern Suns)
  - SG: Kim Sitzmann (South West Slammers)
  - SF: Jasmine Hooper (Willetton Tigers)
  - PF: Stephanie Jones (Cockburn Cougars)
  - C: Emma Cannon (Rockingham Flames)

=== Finals ===
- Men's Grand Final MVP: Jeremiah Wilson (Cockburn Cougars)
- Women's Grand Final MVP: Kim Sitzmann (South West Slammers)
