= Ratiopharm Ulm =

Professional basketball team in Ulm, Germany

ratiopharm Ulm
- Nickname: Die Spatzen (The Sparrows)
- Leagues: Basketball Bundesliga; EuroCup
- Founded: 2001; 25 years ago
- Arena: Ratiopharm Arena
- Capacity: 6,000 (BBL)/5,100 (EuroCup)
- Location: Ulm, Germany
- Team colors: Black, white, orange
- Main sponsor: Ratiopharm
- Head coach: Ty Harrelson
- Ownership: Basketball Ulm/Alb-Donau GmbH
- Affiliation: OrangeAcademy
- Championships: 1 German Championship; 1 German Cup
- Website: ratiopharmulm.com
Home	Away	Third

Ratiopharm Ulm, officially stylized as ratiopharm ulm, is a professional basketball club based in Ulm, Germany. The club has two teams, one professional team, which plays in the Basketball Bundesliga (BBL), the major German professional league and one youth team, which plays in the NBBL (Nachwuchs Basketball-Bundesliga). The home arena of the team is the Ratiopharm Arena, an indoor sporting arena with a capacity of approximately 6,000 spectators.

The mascot of the team is a rabbit named Spass ("fun"), who somewhat resembles Bugs Bunny. The main sponsor of the team is the pharmaceutical company Ratiopharm. The team colors are orange, white, and black.

Ulm has played in the BBL for 20 straight seasons since promoting in 2006, and won the national championship in 2023.

== History ==
=== Early years (2001–2006) ===
The club was founded in 2001 after the previous professional basketball team in Ulm, run by the sports-club SSV Ulm 1846, became insolvent and had to resign from the league. Dr. Thomas Stoll and Andreas Oettel, the current CEO of the Basketball Ulm/Alb-Donau GmbH, which is the owner of the club, bought the license of the former team and started a second division team with the name of Basketball Ulm GmbH. After playing in the second division for five years, the team qualified for the Basketball Bundesliga in 2006.

=== First Bundesliga seasons (2006–2011) ===
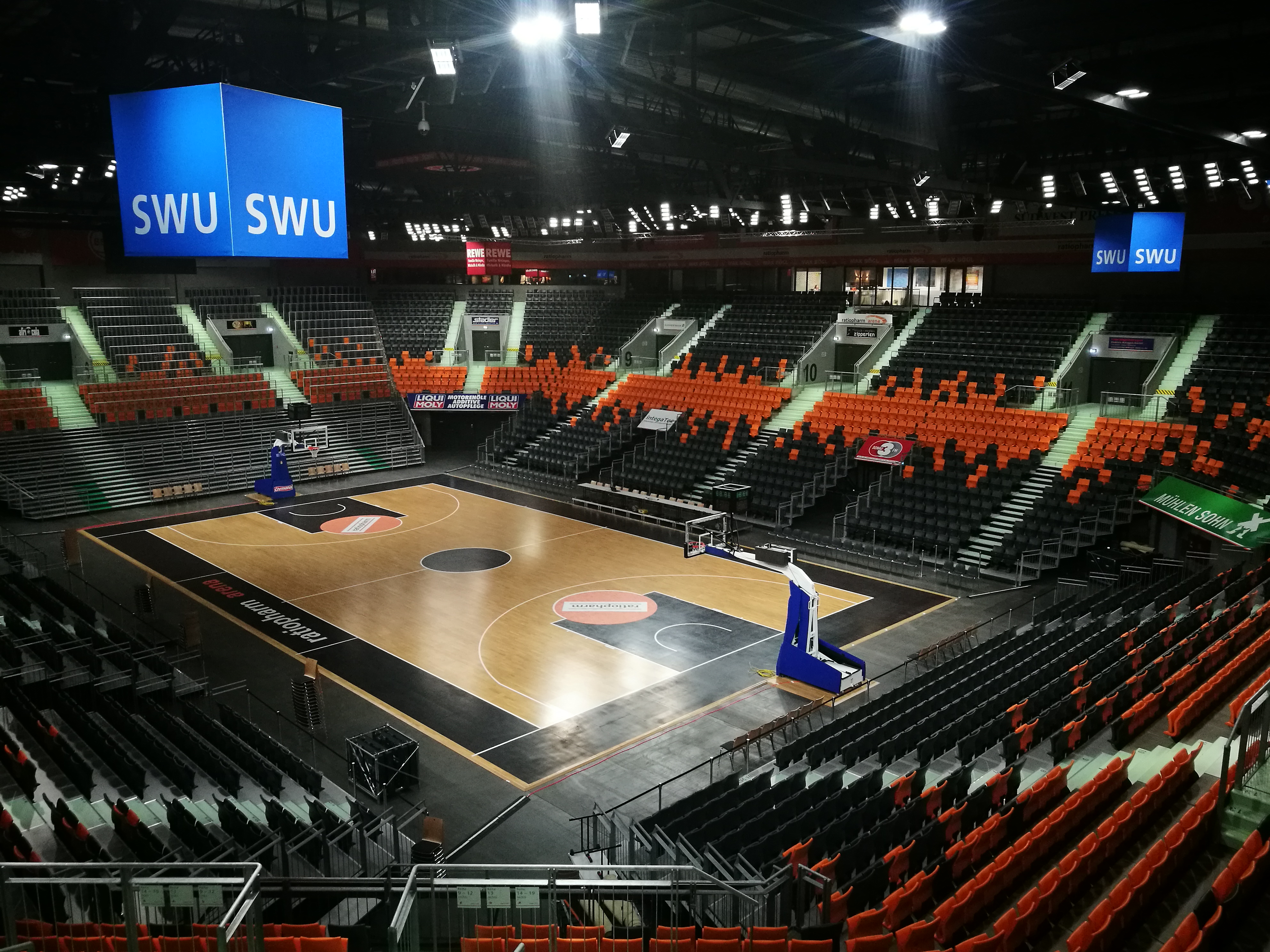
Inside view of the Ratiopharm Arena, the club's home arena since 2011

In the 2006–07 season, led by Head coach Mike Taylor and Assistant coach Rainer Bauer the team headed into their first season in the Basketball Bundesliga as the team with the smallest funds and the smallest arena in the league. With just two new players for the starting five, the team was seen by the media and many experts as the team most likely to be relegated to the second division again after the season. But due to a well-rehearsed team, with only a few players changed in the off-season, the team had some big upset wins and remained in the league with a 16–18 record. At the end of the season point guard Austen Rowland had the league's best assists per game rate and power forward Jeff Gibbs became the best rebounder in the league and was nominated as a starting-five player for the All-Star game.

Still a club with one of the smallest funds in the league, the team experienced some major changes in the pre-season of their second year in the Bundesliga because starting point guard Austen Rowland and shooting guard Jonathan Levy left the team while starting small forward Emeka Erege received a serious injury during an exhibition game. Nevertheless, the team was ranked twelfth in the league after 16 of 34 games with a 9–6 record.

In the 2008–09 season, with a young and talented team, ratiopharm Ulm had a very successful season. At the end of the 2008–09 season ulm was ranked on position five and entered the playoffs with a 21–13 record. But in the playoff the team was eliminated early, throughout a 3–0 loss against Telekom Baskets Bonn.

After a very good season in 2008–09, Ulm lost the league's best rebounder and most efficient player Jeff Gibbs to Eisbären Bremerhaven. The 2009–10 season ended on rank thirteen, which means Ulm was far away from the playoffs and away from a relegation spot, too. In the 2010–11 season, Ulm ended on the 14th place.

=== Climbing the ranks (2011–present) ===
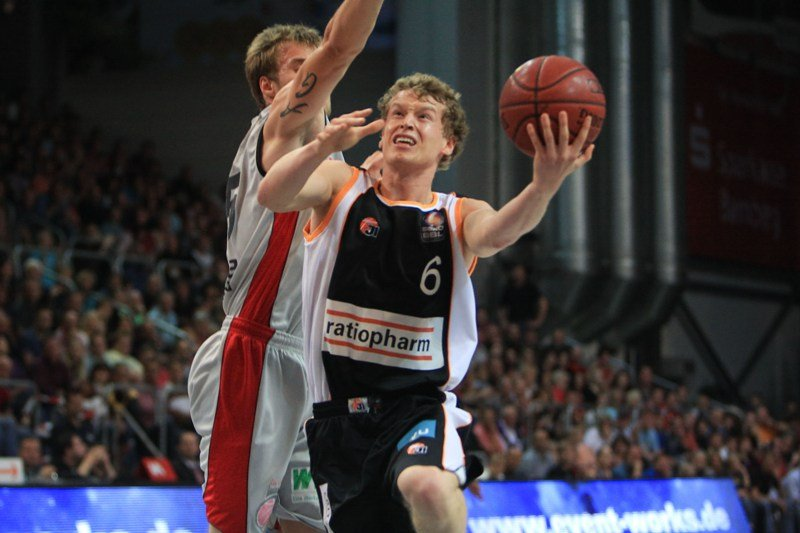
Per Günther, Ulm player since 2008, has been the leader of the team.

In the 2011–12 season Ulm reached the Basketball Bundesliga Finals, after finishing second in the regular season. In the Playoffs Ulm had beaten Phantoms Braunschweig and S.Oliver Baskets and had a Playoff record of 6–0 coming into the Finals. In the Finals Ulm, lost 0–3 to Brose Baskets.

In the 2012–13 season Ulm entered a European competition for the first time, in the 2012–13 Eurocup, the team reached the quarterfinals. Ulm reached the BBL semi-finals and lost in the German Cup Final, 67–85 against Alba Berlin, as well that season.

In the 2016–17 season, the club had a historically successful season as the team started the Basketball Bundesliga with 27 consecutive wins. The club ended in the first place of the regular season with 30 wins and just 2 losses, but could not achieve the title as it lost in the semi-finals of the playoffs by EWE Baskets Oldenburg.

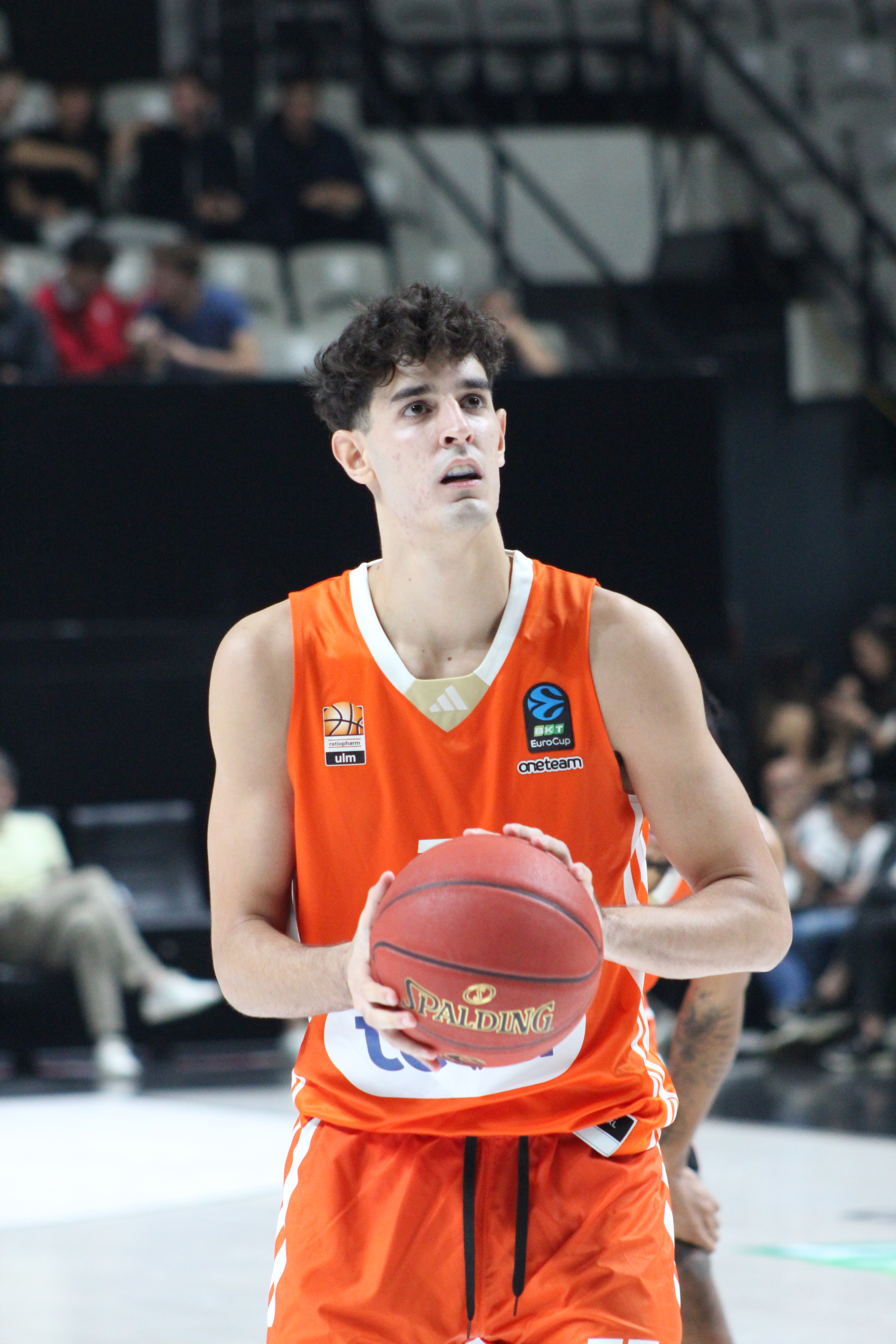
Ben Saraf with Ulm in 2024

In June 2019, Jaka Lakovič signed a three-year contract as head coach of Ulm. His appointment meant the end of the Thorsten Leibenath era, who coached the club for eight seasons. Leibenath stepped down as head coach and started working as sporting director of the club.

On 16 June 2023, Ulm won their first-ever national championship after winning the 2022–23 Basketball Bundesliga season. They defeated Telekom Baskets Bonn in the finals, 3–1, behind Finals MVP Yago dos Santos. As the seventh seed, they were the lowest seed ever to win the national championship in league history.

== Players ==
=== Current roster ===
ratiopharm Ulm roster
Players
Coaches

Pos.	No.	Nat.	Name	Ht.	Age
SG	0	(France)	Atamna, Adam	1.95 m (6 ft 5 in)	18 – 6 December 2007
PG	1	(Germany)	Omog, Namori	1.90 m (6 ft 3 in)	20 – 23 July 2006
G/F	2	(United States)	Watson, Ibi	1.97 m (6 ft 6 in)	28 – 6 January 1998
F	3	(Germany)	Koroma, Dwayne	2.03 m (6 ft 8 in)	25 – 28 April 2001
PG	4	(Poland) (Germany)	Miličić, Teo	1.92 m (6 ft 4 in)	18 – 23 May 2008
SG	10	(United States)	Schmidt, Devin	1.97 m (6 ft 6 in)	31 – 24 November 1994
SF	11	(France)	Faye, Meissa	2.00 m (6 ft 7 in)	18 – 29 December 2007
PF	12	(Germany)	Rataj, Michael	2.04 m (6 ft 8 in)	23 – 12 October 2003
SG	13	(Netherlands)	Slingerland, Yanu	1.94 m (6 ft 4 in)	18 – 15 March 2008
F	15	(Germany)	Failenschmid-Clavera, Nil	2.05 m (6 ft 9 in)	20 – 25 October 2005
SG	30	(United States)	Sims, Jaylen	1.98 m (6 ft 6 in)	27 – 11 December 1998
C	45	(United Kingdom)	Shittu, Simisola	2.08 m (6 ft 10 in)	26 – 7 November 1999
G	47	(Germany)	Heckel, Marvin	1.90 m (6 ft 3 in)	29 – 10 May 1997
SF	55	(Germany)	Liedtke, Lenny	2.00 m (6 ft 7 in)	22 – 8 February 2004
PF	94	(France)	Traoré, Armel	2.03 m (6 ft 8 in)	23 – 23 January 2003

Head coach

- (Australia) (United States) Ty Harrelson

Assistant coach(es)

- (United States) Tyron McCoy

Legend

- (C) Team captain
- Injured

- Roster
Updated: September 15, 2026

=== Depth chart ===
Pos.	Starting 5	Bench 1	Bench 2
C	Armel Traoré	Simisola Shittu	Nil Failenschmid-Clavera
PF	Michael Rataj	Meissa Faye	Devin Schmidt
SF	Dwayne Koroma	Lenny Liedtke	Adam Atamna
SG	Jaylen Sims	Ibi Watson	Yanu Slingerland
PG	Namori Omog	Teo Miličić	Marvin Heckel

== Season by season ==
Season	Tier	League	Pos.	German Cup	European competitions		
2001–02	2	2. BBL	7th				
2002–03	2	2. BBL	3rd				
2003–04	2	2. BBL	2nd				
2004–05	2	2. BBL	2nd				
2005–06	2	2. BBL	1st				
2006–07	1	Bundesliga	12th				
2007–08	1	Bundesliga	12th				
2008–09	1	Bundesliga	6th				
2009–10	1	Bundesliga	13th				
2010–11	1	Bundesliga	14th				
2011–12	1	Bundesliga	2nd	Third position			
2012–13	1	Bundesliga	3rd	Runner-up	2 Eurocup	QF	6–8
2013–14	1	Bundesliga	7th	Runner-up	2 Eurocup	EF	11–7
2014–15	1	Bundesliga	4th	Quarter-finalist	3 EuroChallenge	RS	3–3
2015–16	1	Bundesliga	2nd		2 Eurocup	L32	5–11
2016–17	1	Bundesliga	4th	Quarter-finalist	2 EuroCup	T16	4–10
2017–18	1	Bundesliga	10th	Third position	2 EuroCup	RS	2–8
2018–19	1	Bundesliga	6th	Round of 16	2 EuroCup	T16	8–8
2019–20	1	Bundesliga	3rd	Semifinals	2 EuroCup	Canc.	
2020–21	1	Bundesliga	4th	Semifinals	2 EuroCup	RS	4–6
2021–22	1	Bundesliga	7th	Round of 16	2 EuroCup	QF	8–12
2022–23	1	Bundesliga	1st	Round of 16	2 EuroCup	QF	12–8
2023–24	1	Bundesliga	5th	Runner-up	2 EuroCup	EF	10–9
2024–25	1	Bundesliga	2nd	Round of 16	2 EuroCup	RS	9–9
2025–26	1	Bundesliga	6th	Round of 16	2 EuroCup	RS	7–11
2026–27	1	Bundesliga		Round of 16	2 EuroCup		

== Games against NBA teams ==
16 October 2024

Boxscore

ratiopharm Ulm (Germany)	100–111	(United States) Portland Trail Blazers
Scoring by quarter: 21–28, 24–33, 29–22, 26–28
Pts: Essengue 20; Rebs: Essengue 8 Asts: Herkenhoff, Klepeisz, Plummer 4 each		Pts: Henderson 23; Rebs: Clingan 11; Asts: Henderson 6

Moda Center, Portland, OR
Attendance: 11,627
Referees: JB DeRosa, Tre Maddox, Tyler Mirkovich

== Honors and awards ==
- Basketball Bundesliga
  - Winners: 2022–23
  - Runners-up: 1997–98, 2011–12, 2015–16, 2024–25
- BBL-Pokal
  - Winners: 1996
  - Runners-up: 1994, 1995, 2013, 2014, 2024
- BBL Champions Cup
  - Runners-up: 2012
- ProA
  - Champions: 2005–06
- Stechert Cup
  - Winners: 2011

== Team ==
=== Award winners ===
BBL Most Valuable Player

- John Bryant (2012, 2013)
- Raymar Morgan (2017)

BBL Finals Most Valuable Player

- Yago dos Santos (2023)

BBL Coach of the Year

- Thorsten Leibenath (2012, 2017)

BBL Best Young Player

- Daniel Theis (2014)

BBL Best Offensive Player

- John Bryant (2013)
- Raymar Morgan (2017)

=== Players in the NBA draft ===
*	Denotes player who has been selected for at least one All-Star Game and All-NBA Team
^{#}	Denotes player who has never appeared in an NBA regular-season or playoff game
^{~}	Denotes player who has been selected as Rookie of the Year

Position	Player	Year	Round	Pick	Drafted by
PG	(France) Killian Hayes	2020	1st round	7th	Detroit Pistons
SF/PG	(France) Pacôme Dadiet	2024	1st round	25th	New York Knicks
PG	(Spain) Juan Núñez^{#}	2024	2nd round	36th	Indiana Pacers
PF	(France) Noa Essengue	2025	1st round	12th	Chicago Bulls
PG/SG	(Israel) Ben Saraf	2025	1st round	26th	Brooklyn Nets

=== Notable players ===
Note: Flags indicate national team eligibility at FIBA-sanctioned events. Players may hold other non-FIBA nationalities not displayed.

Criteria

To appear in this section a player must have either:

- Set a club record or won an individual award while at the club
- Played at least one official international match for their national team at any time
- Played at least one official NBA match at any time.

- (Germany) Ismet Akpinar
- (Germany) Stephen Arigbabu
- (Germany) Robin Benzing
- (Germany) Jens Kujawa
- (Germany) Tim Ohlbrecht
- (Germany) Uwe Sauer
- (Germany) Daniel Theis
- (Germany) Konrad Wysocki
- (Brazil) Bruno Caboclo
- (Brazil) Yago dos Santos
- (England) Ray Carter
- (France) Pacôme Dadiet
- (France) Killian Hayes
- (France) Noa Essengue
- (Greece) Ian Vougioukas
- (Iceland) Fannar Ólafsson
- (Israel) Ben Saraf
- (Israel) Alon Stein
- (Poland) Igor Miličić Jr.
- (Spain) Juan Núñez
- (Dominican Republic) (United States) L. J. Figueroa
- (United States) Chris Babb
- (United States) Kyle Bailey
- (United States) John Bryant
- (United States) Deonte Burton
- (United States) Will Clyburn
- (United States) Jeff Gibbs
- (United States) Trent Plaisted
- (United States) Abdul Shamsid-Deen
- (United States) Jarvis Walker
- (United States) (Montenegro) Javonte Green

=== Head coaches ===
2001	(United States) Tom Ludwig
2003–2011	(United States) Mike Taylor
2011–2019	(Germany) Thorsten Leibenath
2019–2022	(Slovenia) Jaka Lakovič
2022–2024	(Germany) (Slovakia) Anton Gavel
2024–present	(Australia) (United States) Ty Harrelson
