= 2013 State Basketball League season =

- League: State Basketball League
- Sport: Basketball
- Duration: 15 March – 27 July (Regular season); 2 August – 31 August (Finals)
- Games: 26 (men); 22 (women)
- Teams: 14 (men); 12 (women)

Regular season
- Minor premiers: M: Lakeside Lightning; W: Willetton Tigers
- Season MVP: M: Ben Beran (Lightning); W: Sami Whitcomb (Flames)
- Top scorer: M: Luke Nevill (Suns); W: Sami Whitcomb (Flames)

Finals
- Champions: M: Lakeside Lightning; W: Wanneroo Wolves
- Runners-up: M: Wanneroo Wolves; W: Kalamunda Eastern Suns
- Grand Final MVP: M: Justin Cecil (Lightning); W: Nikita-Lee Martin (Wolves)

SBL seasons
- ← 2012 2014 →

The 2013 State Basketball League season was the 25th season of the State Basketball League (SBL). The regular season began on Friday 15 March and ended on Saturday 27 July. The finals began on Friday 2 August and concluded with the women's grand final on Friday 30 August and the men's grand final on Saturday 31 August.

== Pre-season ==
The 2013 SBL Pre-Season Blitz was held at the WA Basketball Centre between Friday 1 March and Sunday 3 March.

== Regular season ==
The regular season began on Friday 15 March and ended on Saturday 27 July after 20 rounds of competition.

=== Standings ===
Men's ladder

Pos
Pos	Team	W	L
1	Lakeside Lightning	23	3
2	Perry Lakes Hawks	18	8
3	Geraldton Buccaneers	18	8
4	East Perth Eagles	15	11
5	South West Slammers	15	11
6	Wanneroo Wolves	15	11
7	Mandurah Magic	15	11
8	Perth Redbacks	14	12
9	Willetton Tigers	12	14
10	Cockburn Cougars	10	16
11	Rockingham Flames	9	17
12	Stirling Senators	9	17
13	Goldfields Giants	5	21
14	Kalamunda Eastern Suns	4	22

Women's ladder

Pos
Pos	Team	W	L
1	Willetton Tigers	17	5
2	Rockingham Flames	16	6
3	Wanneroo Wolves	16	6
4	Lakeside Lightning	13	9
5	Kalamunda Eastern Suns	12	10
6	Stirling Senators	11	11
7	Cockburn Cougars	11	11
8	South West Slammers	11	11
9	Perth Redbacks	10	12
10	Perry Lakes Hawks	9	13
11	Mandurah Magic	5	17
12	East Perth Eagles	1	21

== Finals ==
The finals began on Friday 2 August and consisted of three rounds. The finals concluded with the women's grand final on Friday 30 August and the men's grand final on Saturday 31 August.

=== Men's bracket ===
Quarter-finals
1	Lakeside Lightning	84	106	X
8	Perth Redbacks	79	90	X
4	East Perth Eagles	102	134	X
5	South West Slammers	70	101	X
2	Perry Lakes Hawks	96	98	84
7	Mandurah Magic	107	88	74
3	Geraldton Buccaneers	81	81	X
6	Wanneroo Wolves	96	93	X

Semi-finals
1	Lakeside Lightning	98	131	X
4	East Perth Eagles	88	75	X
2	Perry Lakes Hawks	91	98	X
6	Wanneroo Wolves	107	104	X

Grand final
Lakeside Lightning	77	X	X
Wanneroo Wolves	74	X	X

==== Grand Final summary ====
31 August 2013
7:30 pm

Box score
Report

Lakeside Lightning 77, Wanneroo Wolves 74
Pts: Justin Cecil 25; Rebs: Jarrad Prue 21; Asts: Beran, Cecil 2 each	Pts: Damian Matacz 20; Rebs: Damian Matacz 11; Asts: Robbins, Salinas 4 each
Lakeside wins SBL Championship

WA Basketball Centre, Floreat
MVP: Justin Cecil (Lightning)

=== Women's bracket ===
Quarter-finals
1	Willetton Tigers	65	62	X
8	South West Slammers	67	68	X
4	Lakeside Lightning	62	60	X
5	Kalamunda Eastern Suns	65	71	X
2	Rockingham Flames	105	89	X
7	Cockburn Cougars	89	70	X
3	Wanneroo Wolves	84	75	X
6	Stirling Senators	59	68	X

Semi-finals
8	South West Slammers	53	77	X
5	Kalamunda Eastern Suns	69	92	X
2	Rockingham Flames	76	82	52
3	Wanneroo Wolves	89	72	60

Grand final
Kalamunda Eastern Suns	47	X	X
Wanneroo Wolves	72	X	X

==== Grand Final summary ====
30 August 2013
7:30 pm

Box score
Report

Wanneroo Wolves 72, Kalamunda Eastern Suns 47
Pts: Casey Lockwood 14; Rebs: Ainsleigh Sanders 13; Asts: Shani Caldwell 5	Pts: Jennie Rintala 11; Rebs: Jennie Rintala 7 Asts: Adrienne Johnson 5
Wanneroo wins SBL Championship

WA Basketball Centre, Floreat
MVP: Nikita-Lee Martin (Wolves)

== Awards ==
=== Player of the Week ===
Round	Men's Player	Team	Women's Player	Team	Ref
1	Ty Harrelson	South West Slammers	Taylor Lilley	Stirling Senators	
2	Robert Kampman	Geraldton Buccaneers	Ashlee Sidebottom	Mandurah Magic	
3	Jamahr Warren	South West Slammers	Stephanie Jones	Cockburn Cougars	
4	Quinn McDowell	Willetton Tigers	Marita Payne	Perth Redbacks	
5	Ty Harrelson	South West Slammers	Lisa Wallbutton	Willetton Tigers	
6	Quinn McDowell	Willetton Tigers	Sami Whitcomb	Rockingham Flames	
7	Ben Beran	Lakeside Lightning	Nikita-Lee Martin	Wanneroo Wolves	
8	Taylor Mullenax	Mandurah Magic	Kim Sitzmann	South West Slammers	
9	Markhuri Sanders-Frison	Goldfields Giants	Adrienne Jones	Kalamunda Eastern Suns	
10	Ty Harrelson	South West Slammers	Sami Whitcomb	Rockingham Flames	
11	Jordan Wild	Stirling Senators	Stephanie Jones	Cockburn Cougars	
12	Tom Jervis	East Perth Eagles	Amber Land	Stirling Senators	
13	Damien Scott	Cockburn Cougars	Gabriella Clayton	Perry Lakes Hawks	
14	Jarrad Prue	Lakeside Lightning	Sami Whitcomb	Rockingham Flames	
15	Luke Nevill	Kalamunda Eastern Suns	Chelsea Burns	Wanneroo Wolves	
16	Carter Cook	Geraldton Buccaneers	Sami Whitcomb	Rockingham Flames	
17	Cory Cooperwood	Stirling Senators	Antonia Edmondson	Willetton Tigers	
18	Tom Jervis	East Perth Eagles	Taylor Lilley	Stirling Senators	
19	Rhett Della Maddalena	Mandurah Magic	Amber Land	Stirling Senators	
20	Tom Jervis	East Perth Eagles	Nikita-Lee Martin	Wanneroo Wolves	

=== Statistics leaders ===
Category	Men's Player	Team	Stat	Women's Player	Team	Stat
Points per game	Luke Nevill	Kalamunda Eastern Suns	32.29	Sami Whitcomb	Rockingham Flames	23.21
Rebounds per game	Jarrad Prue	Lakeside Lightning	20.38	Lisa Wallbutton	Willetton Tigers	13.79
Assists per game	Ty Harrelson	South West Slammers	8.92	Jessica Van Schie	Lakeside Lightning	4.32
Steals per game	Michael Lay	Perry Lakes Hawks	2.29	Chelsea Burns	Wanneroo Wolves	2.90
Blocks per game	Tom Jervis	East Perth Eagles	3.04	Marita Payne	Perth Redbacks	3.86
Field goal percentage	Jarrad Prue	Lakeside Lightning	69.6%	Marita Payne	Perth Redbacks	47.8%
3-pt field goal percentage	Quinn McDowell	Willetton Tigers	45.1%	Melissa Marsh	Willetton Tigers	38.6%
Free throw percentage	Robert Kampman	Geraldton Buccaneers	89.1%	Krystal Stoneking	Lakeside Lightning	77.1%

=== Regular season ===
The 2013 Basketball WA Annual Awards Night was held on Saturday 7 September at nib Stadium.

- Men's Most Valuable Player: Ben Beran (Lakeside Lightning)
- Women's Most Valuable Player: Sami Whitcomb (Rockingham Flames)
- Men's Coach of the Year: Andy Stewart (Lakeside Lightning)
- Women's Coach of the Year: Glenn Ellis (Stirling Senators)
- Men's Most Improved Player: Nikolas Iliadis (Stirling Senators)
- Women's Most Improved Player: Gabby O'Sullivan (Perth Redbacks)
- Men's All-Star Five:
  - PG: Ty Harrelson (South West Slammers)
  - SG: Quinn McDowell (Willetton Tigers)
  - SF: Ben Beran (Lakeside Lightning)
  - PF: Taylor Mullenax (Mandurah Magic)
  - C: Tom Jervis (East Perth Eagles)
- Women's All-Star Five:
  - PG: Taylor Wild (Stirling Senators)
  - SG: Kim Sitzmann (South West Slammers)
  - SF: Sami Whitcomb (Rockingham Flames)
  - PF: Lisa Wallbutton (Willetton Tigers)
  - C: Marita Payne (Perth Redbacks)

=== Finals ===
- Men's Grand Final MVP: Justin Cecil (Lakeside Lightning)
- Women's Grand Final MVP: Nikita-Lee Martin (Wanneroo Wolves)

=== 25 Year SBL All Star teams ===
==== Men ====
- Coach: John Gardiner
- Assistant coach: Andy Stewart

Point guards		Off guards		Small forwards		Power forwards		Centres	
Selections	Teams	Selections	Teams	Selections	Teams	Selections	Teams	Selections	Teams
Brian Fundingsland	Geraldton; Wanneroo	Jeff Anderson	Willetton	James Fitch	South West	Dan Hunt	Geraldton	Peter Hansen	Perry Lakes
Ryan Gardiner	Perry Lakes	Greg Brown	Geraldton; Cockburn	Carmie Olowoyo	Rockingham; Stirling	Vince Kelley	Kanyana/Mandurah; Wanneroo; Rockingham; East Perth	Jarrad Prue	Lakeside; Willetton
Shamus Ballantyne	Willetton; Goldfields; Geraldton	Wade Bennett	South West	Jamie Baker	Perth	Allan Erickson	Cockburn; Geraldton		
Troy Clarke	Cockburn; WAIS								

==== Women ====
- Coach: Rick Morcom
- Assistant coach: Glenn Ellis

Point guards		Off guards		Small forwards		Power forwards		Centres	
Selections	Teams	Selections	Teams	Selections	Teams	Selections	Teams	Selections	Teams
Tully Bevilaqua	Cockburn; Swan City; Rockingham; Willetton	Jenny Bedford	Perry Lakes; Wanneroo; Stirling; East Perth; Perth	Narelle Henry	Stirling; Perry Lakes; Wanneroo; East Perth; Perth	Melissa Sinfield	Perry Lakes	Natasha Bargeus	Wanneroo; Perth; Rockingham; Stirling
Tanya Kelly	Willetton; Perry Lakes	Jenny Marsh	Perth; Perry Lakes	Casey Mihovilovich	Mandurah	Christine Boyd	Wanneroo; Perth; Rockingham; Perry Lakes	Maryanne Briggs	Wanneroo; Stirling; East Perth; Perth
Kim Malajczuk	Perry Lakes	Melissa Marsh	Willetton	Tegan Walker	Perry Lakes; East Perth; Geraldton; Stirling	Kaye Tucker	Mandurah; Rockingham	Brooke Hiddleston	Wanneroo; Swan City; Stirling; Perth
