= Jarvis Walker (basketball) =

American basketball player

Jarvis Dale Walker (born August 30, 1966 in Detroit, Michigan) is a retired American professional basketball player. He is one of the all-time greats of the German Basketball Bundesliga.

== Career ==
A 6’2" guard for Ferris State University from 1985 to 1989, Walker wrapped up his college career as the Bulldogs’ fifth all-time leading scorer with 1,713 points (114 games) and as the leading assist man (532) in school history. He earned several awards during his time at Ferris State, including All-Great Lakes Intercollegiate Athletic Conference (GLIAC) Co-Player of the Year honors in 1989, All-GLIAC First Team recognition in 1987, 1988 and 1989, All-GLIAC Freshman of the Year honors in 1986 as well as All-GLIAC Defensive Team honors in 1987 and 1988.

After college, Walker worked out with the Charlotte Hornets of the NBA, before taking his game to Germany, signing with SSV Ulm of the country's top flight, Basketball Bundesliga. Eventually, Walker spent his entire professional career with the Ulm team (1990–1999, 2000–01), helping them win the 1996 German cup title and advancing to the Bundesliga finals in 1998. In parts of the 2000–01 season, he served as a player/coach. His 6.581 points in Bundesliga play ranked second all-time in the league when he left in 2001. Walker also played in European competition for Ulm, including the Korac Cup, the EuroCup and the Saporta Cup.

Following his retirement as a basketball player, Walker returned to the United States. His daughter Jordan, the 2016–17 Miss Basketball in Michigan, played college basketball at Western Michigan University and the University of Tennessee. Son Jarvis II played basketball at the Purdue University Fort Wayne, before transferring to the University of Indianapolis.
