= Peter Hansen (basketball) =

American basketball player (born 1965)

Personal information
- Born: February 15, 1965 (age 61) Milwaukee, Wisconsin, U.S.
- Listed height: 200 cm (6 ft 7 in)
- Listed weight: 105 kg (231 lb)

Career information
- College: St. Mary's (1984–1987)
- NBA draft: 1987: undrafted
- Playing career: 1989–1997
- Position: Forward

Career history
- 1989–1990: Perry Lakes Hawks
- 1991–1992: Perth Wildcats
- 1993–1997: Perry Lakes Hawks
- 1995–1996: Perth Wildcats

Career highlights
- 2× NBL champion (1991, 1995); NBL Grand Final MVP (1991); SBL champion (1994); SBL Most Valuable Player (1989); NAIA All-American (1987); 2× All-Big State Conference (1986, 1987)

Peter Hansen (born February 15, 1965) is an American former professional basketball player. He played nine seasons in Australia across the National Basketball League (NBL) with the Perth Wildcats and the State Basketball League (SBL) with the Perry Lakes Hawks. After playing college basketball with the St. Mary's Rattlers, Hansen debuted for the Hawks in 1989 and won the SBL Most Valuable Player Award. Upon joining the Wildcats in 1991, he led the team to the NBL championship behind a grand final MVP performance. He went on to win an SBL championship with the Hawks in 1994 and a second NBL championship with the Wildcats in 1995.

== Early life ==
Hansen was born in Milwaukee, Wisconsin.

== College career ==
Hansen played college basketball at St. Mary's University in San Antonio, Texas, between 1984 and 1987. He played 126 games for the Rattlers and earned All-Big State Conference honors in 1985–86 and 1986–87. He also earned All-NAIA District IV honors in 1985–86 and NAIA All-American honors in 1986–87.

== Professional career ==
Hansen arrived in Australia in 1989 after stints in Venezuela and Spain. He joined the Perry Lakes Hawks of the State Basketball League (SBL) and was named SBL co-Most Valuable Player after averaging 39.8 points in 20 games. With the Hawks in 1990, he averaged 31.0 points in 26 games.

Hansen joined the Perth Wildcats of the National Basketball League (NBL) for the 1991 season. He helped the team reach the NBL grand final series, where they won the championship and Hansen was named grand final MVP. He formed a formidable forward combination with Andrew Vlahov. In 31 games, he averaged 16.2 points, 9.5 rebounds, 1.8 assists, 1.5 steals and 1.1 blocks per game. With the Wildcats in the 1992 season, he averaged 14.4 points, 9.1 rebounds, 1.9 assists and 1.0 steals in 27 games.

Hansen returned to the Perry Lakes Hawks for the 1993 SBL season, where he averaged 26.3 points in 26 games. With the Hawks in 1994, he helped them win the SBL championship while averaging 22.8 points in 32 games. He had 24 points and 17 rebounds in the grand final.

In 1995, Hansen averaged 23.2 points in 26 SBL games for the Perry Lakes Hawks and was also a member of the Perth Wildcats' NBL championship-winning squad. He only appeared in one game for the Wildcats during the 1995 season.

In 1996, Hansen again split the year with the Hawks and the Wildcats, averaging 21.1 points in 25 SBL games for the Hawks and 6.2 points in 13 NBL games for the Wildcats. He played 72 games for the Wildcats over four seasons.

Hansen's final season came in 1997 with the Perry Lakes Hawks, averaging 14.1 points in 24 SBL games.

In 2013, Hansen was named in the 25 Year MSBL All Star team. He was inducted into the Perry Lakes Hawks Hall of Fame in 2023.

== Personal life ==
As of 2012, Hansen was an executive director in charge of fundraising and alumni at his old college, St Mary's University.
