= Tom Jervis =

Australian basketball player (born 1987)

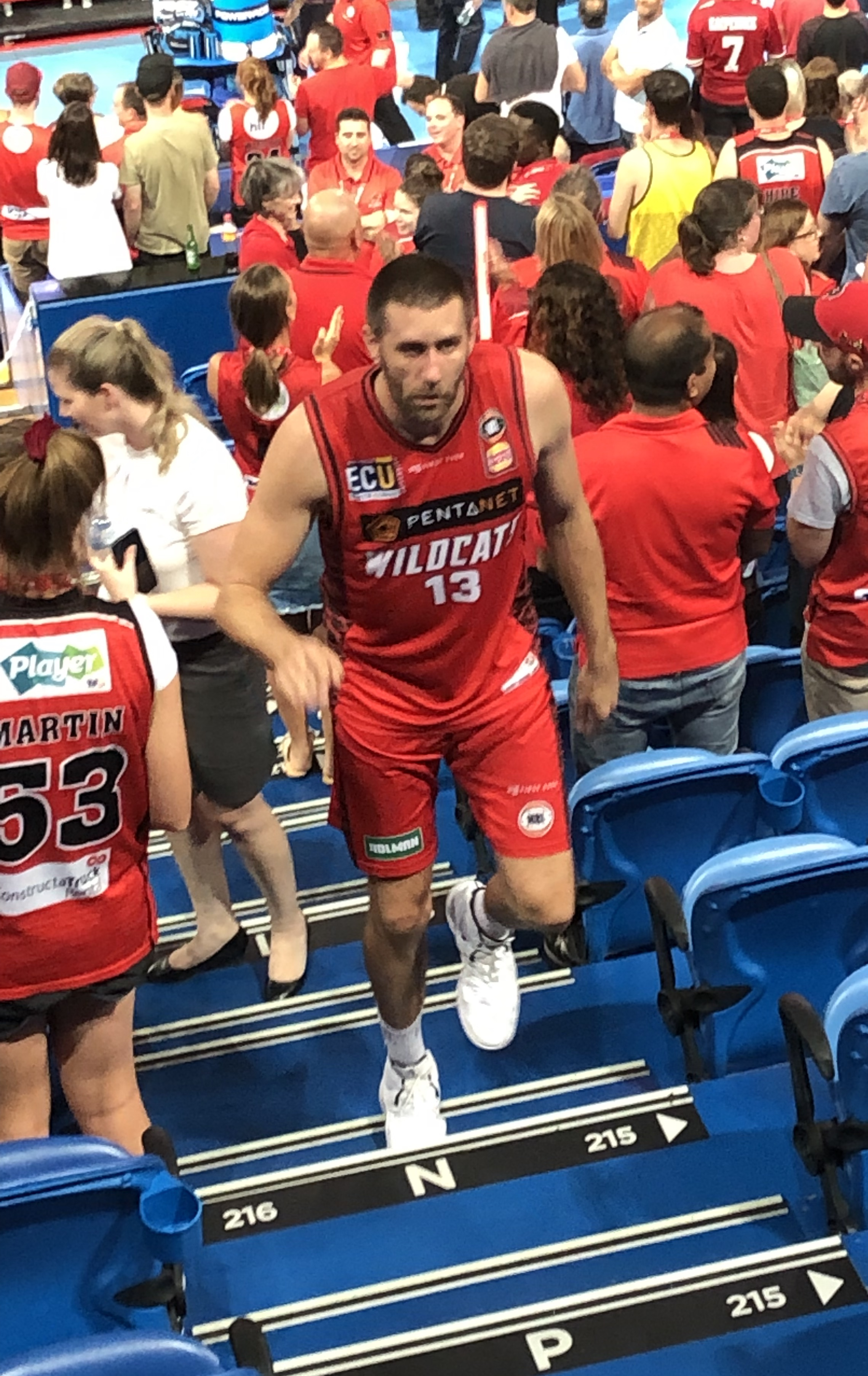
- Jervis in February 2019

Clube Basket de Queluz
- Position: Centre
- League: Proliga

Personal information
- Born: 4 February 1987 (age 39) Kalgoorlie, Western Australia, Australia
- Listed height: 211 cm (6 ft 11 in)
- Listed weight: 105 kg (231 lb)

Career information
- High school: Morley Senior (Perth, Western Australia)
- College: Bevill State CC (2005–2007); Troy (2007–2009)
- NBA draft: 2009: undrafted
- Playing career: 2005–2019, 2021–present

Career history
- 2005: East Perth Eagles
- 2006: Perth Redbacks
- 2009–2016: East Perth Eagles
- 2013–2016: Perth Wildcats
- 2016–2018: Brisbane Bullets
- 2017: Brisbane Spartans
- 2018–2019: Perth Wildcats
- 2021: Perth Wildcats
- 2021–2023: Rockingham Flames
- 2026–present: Clube Basket de Queluz

Career highlights
- 3× NBL champion (2014, 2016, 2019); NBL Cup winner (2021); NBL Rookie of the Year (2014); NBL1 National champion (2022); 2× SBL / NBL1 West champion (2014, 2022); 3× SBL All-Star Five (2011–2013)

Thomas Lachlan Jervis (born 4 February 1987) is an Australian professional basketball player for Clube Basket de Queluz of the Portuguese Proliga. He played college basketball for Bevill State Community College and Troy University in the United States before debuting in the National Basketball League (NBL). He won two NBL championships with the Perth Wildcats between 2013 and 2016. After two seasons with the Brisbane Bullets, Jervis returned to the Wildcats in 2018 and won his third championship. He retired from basketball in 2019 but made a comeback in January 2021 to re-join the Wildcats.

In the State Basketball League (SBL) / NBL1 West, Jervis won a SBL championship with the East Perth Eagles in 2014 and a NBL1 West championship with the Rockingham Flames in 2022.

== Early life and career ==
Jervis was born in the regional Western Australian city of Kalgoorlie. After moving to Perth from the Goldfields as a child, Jervis made his way through the ranks as a junior at the East Perth Basketball Association. He attended Morley Senior High School, represented Western Australia in Under 18s and Under 20s, and made his debut in the State Basketball League (SBL) with the East Perth Eagles in 2005. In 2006, he had a three-game stint with the Perth Redbacks in the SBL.

Between 2005 and 2007, Jervis played basketball for Bevill State Community College. On 24 January 2007, he committed to play for Troy University, joining the Trojans via the JUCO transfer market. As a junior at Troy in 2007–08, Jervis averaged 5.0 points and 4.1 rebounds in 29 games (eight starts). As a senior in 2008–09, he averaged 6.7 points and 6.5 rebounds in 32 games (30 starts).

Following his senior season at Troy, Jervis had a short-lived stint in Germany with Mitteldeutscher BC, signing on 24 July but only to part ways with the team on 24 August for personal reasons.

Jervis played for the Eagles between 2009 and 2013, earning SBL All-Star Five honours every year between 2011 and 2013.

By June 2011, Jervis had established himself as a household name in the SBL and was a regular at Perth Wildcats training sessions. As a result, he earned a call-up to the Australian Boomers squad for their training camp in preparation for their double-header against China in the 2011 YouYi Games. He ultimately did not make the final team, but he had hoped the experience would help him earn the 10th and final place on the Wildcats' roster for the 2011–12 season. Joining Jervis on the shortlist included Everard Bartlett, Greg Hire and Ben Purser. After missing out on the spot to childhood-friend Hire, Jervis was overlooked for a roster spot by the Cairns Taipans after going on tour with them in China.

== Professional career ==
=== Perth Wildcats (2013–2016) ===
==== 2013–14 season ====
"I always hoped to make it as a pro basketballer, but I felt that dream had almost slipped away, so I got on with my life and got a job, but to get that call from the Wildcats was unbelievable, it's something I've worked very hard to achieve."

— Tom Jervis, August 2013

"He's developed really well over the past few months. He always showed potential obviously through his time at college, and he's got some great stats in the SBL. But there's that edge that he's gained now."

— Andy Stewart, October 2013

In June 2013, Jervis started a new career selling radiators to mine sites. Just two months later, on 12 August 2013, he put that career on hold after he signed a one-year contract with the Perth Wildcats. Despite the strength in depth of the Wildcats roster, Jervis forced his way into the rotation, beginning the 2013–14 season as the starting centre with Matt Knight out injured. On 24 January 2014, he scored a season-best 21 points in an 83–80 loss to the Melbourne Tigers. Jervis helped the Wildcats go 21–7 in the regular season before going on to reach the 2014 NBL Grand Final series, where they won the championship with a 2–1 defeat over the Adelaide 36ers. He subsequently earned NBL Rookie of the Year honours. Jervis appeared in all 33 games, averaging 5.1 points, 4.8 rebounds, 1.2 assists and 1.2 blocks per game.

After winning a championship with the Wildcats, Jervis re-joined the East Perth Eagles and helped them win their maiden SBL championship in August 2014. In the grand final, Jervis led the way for East Perth with 22 points, 19 rebounds, three assists and three blocked shots.

==== 2014–15 season ====
After toying with free agency and meeting with Melbourne United, Jervis decided to re-sign with the Wildcats for another two seasons in June 2014. He attracted plenty of attention from rival clubs and was tempted by lucrative offers.

On 31 December 2014, Jervis had a season-best performance in his 50th NBL game, recording his first double-double of the season with 10 points and 10 rebounds in an 86–77 win over the Wollongong Hawks. On 9 January 2015, he scored a season-high 17 points in a 91–76 loss to the Cairns Taipans. On 23 January, he recorded his second career double-double with 12 points and 11 rebounds in a 93–85 overtime win over the Townsville Crocodiles. The Wildcats finished the 2014–15 season in fourth place with a 16–12 record, and lost 2–0 to the Taipans in the semi-finals. Jervis appeared in all 30 games, averaging 7.1 points, 4.9 rebounds and 1.0 blocks per game.

On 18 April 2015, in his sole appearance for the East Perth Eagles during the 2015 season, Jervis had 26 points, seven rebounds and three assists on the back of shooting 10-of-13 from the floor in a 112–98 loss to the Mandurah Magic.

==== 2015–16 season ====
With the Wildcats' off-season addition of Nathan Jawai, Jervis' minutes were reduced coming into the 2015–16 season. Despite this, Jervis still managed a solid start to the season, scoring a season-high 10 points on 4 November in a loss to the Townsville Crocodiles, and recording an equal career-high 11 rebounds on 11 November in a win over the Illawarra Hawks. Over his first 12 games, Jervis' influence was reflective in statistics that are extrapolated for 30 minutes of playing time – 4.6 rebounds in 12:24 minutes per game equaled 11.87 rebounds per 30 minutes, a mark ranking third across the entire NBL behind only Majok Majok (13.7 per 30) and Charles Jackson (12.56). That mark increased to 12.1 rebounds per 30 minutes following Round 10, good for second in the league. On 5 February 2016, Jervis had a career-best game in a home win over the Sydney Kings. In 28 minutes off the bench, he recorded career highs of 23 points and 13 rebounds, tied a career high with six assists, and also added two blocks in leading the Wildcats to a 95–81 victory, booking the club a place in the playoffs for the 30th straight season. The Wildcats finished the regular season in second place with an 18–10 record, and defeated the third-seeded Illawarra Hawks 2–1 in the semi-finals, moving them on to the 2016 NBL Grand Final series, where they defeated the New Zealand Breakers 2–1 to claim their seventh NBL championship. Jervis appeared in all 34 games for the Wildcats in 2015–16, averaging 6.7 points, 5.0 rebounds and 1.2 blocks per game.

=== Brisbane Bullets (2016–2018) ===
==== 2016–17 season ====
On 18 April 2016, Jervis turned his back on Perth to join the Brisbane Bullets on a three-year deal. He had the option to stay in his home state, but chose to head east in the search for more court time and to renew his association with Australian Boomers and Bullets coach Andrej Lemanis. The following month, he re-joined the East Perth Eagles.

Jervis made his debut for the Bullets in their season opener on 6 October, recording five points and six rebounds in 13 minutes as a starter in a 72–65 win over his former team, the Perth Wildcats. On 16 October, he had a season-best game with 12 points and 13 rebounds in a 96–93 overtime loss to the Adelaide 36ers. On 10 December, he scored a season-high 18 points (also a team high) off the bench in a 98–88 loss to the Illawarra Hawks. In the Bullets' regular season finale on 11 February 2017, Jervis scored 14 points off the bench in a 106–79 loss to Illawarra. The Bullets finished the season with a 10–18 record. Jervis appeared in all 28 games, averaging 7.4 points, 4.9 rebounds and 1.1 assists per game.

In April 2017, Jervis joined the Brisbane Spartans for the 2017 Queensland Basketball League season. In his debut for the Spartans in their season opener on 29 April, Jervis recorded 21 points, 17 rebounds, four blocks, three steals and two assists in a 75–58 win over the Logan Thunder. On 27 May, he recorded 39 points and 23 rebounds in a 99–86 loss to the Brisbane Capitals. In 12 games for the Spartans, he averaged 22.9 points, 12.7 rebounds and 1.9 assists per game.

==== 2017–18 season ====
On 7 December 2017, Jervis scored a season-high 20 points in the Bullets' 96–89 loss to the New Zealand Breakers. The Bullets finished the 2017–18 season with a 9–19 record. In 24 games, Jervis averaged 10.2 points and 4.5 rebounds per game. Following the season, the Bullets gave Jervis permission to talk with rival clubs.

=== Return to the Wildcats (2018–2019) ===
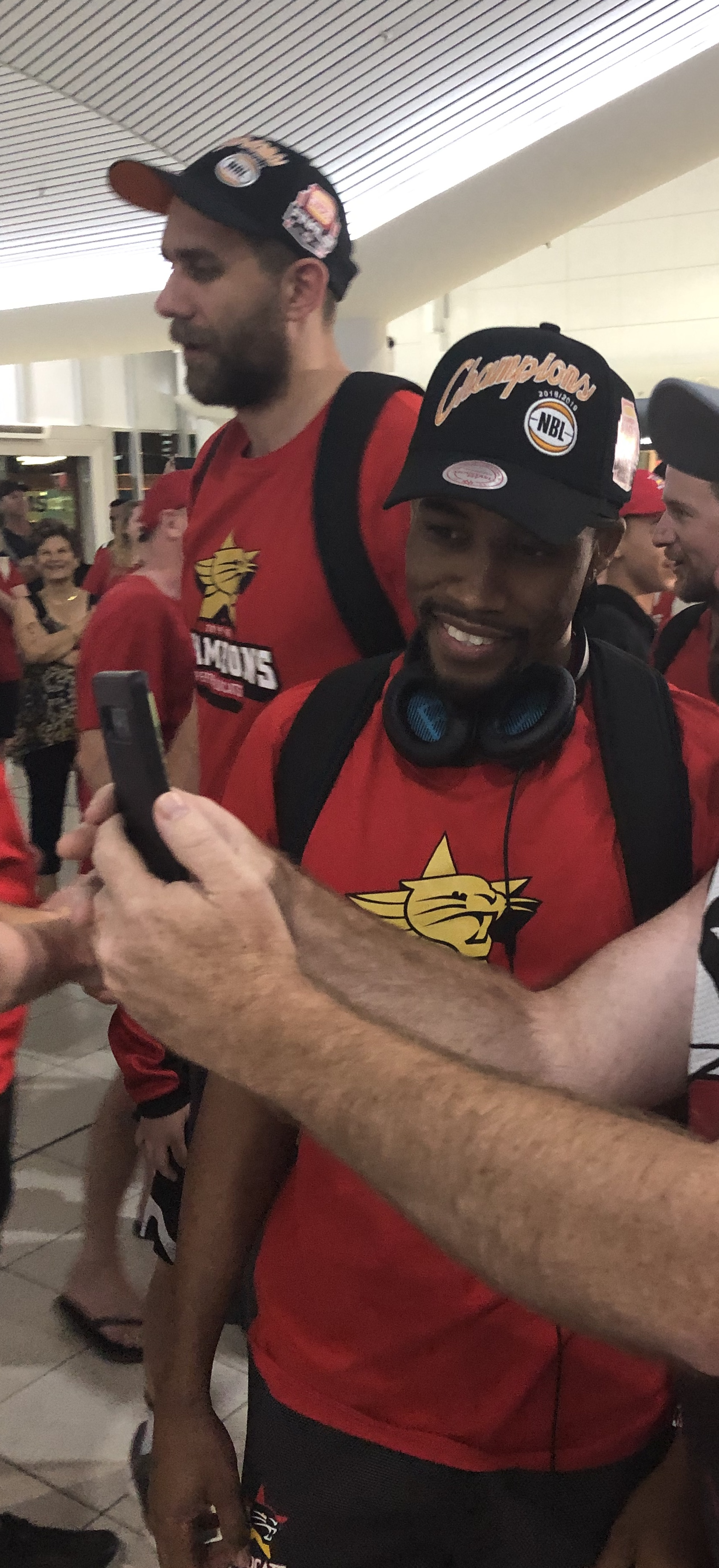
Jervis (background) and teammate Bryce Cotton after winning the 2019 NBL championship

On 16 May 2018, Jervis signed with the Perth Wildcats for the 2018–19 NBL season, returning to the club for a second stint. In the Wildcats' season opener on 11 October, Jervis recorded 12 points, seven rebounds and two blocks in a 99–91 win over the Adelaide 36ers. It was Jervis' 150th NBL game and his first for the Wildcats since 2016. In March 2019, he helped the Wildcats win the championship after defeating Melbourne United 3–1 in the NBL Grand Final series. In 33 games, he averaged 3.8 points and 3.0 rebounds per game.

In April 2019, Jervis parted ways with the Wildcats and signed a two-year deal with the Cairns Taipans. However, on 3 August 2019, Jervis was released from his contract by the Taipans after he made the decision to retire from the NBL in order to provide stability for his wife and daughter.

=== Third stint with the Wildcats (2021) ===
On 14 January 2021, Jervis came out of retirement to sign with the Perth Wildcats ahead of the delayed 2020–21 NBL season. In the Wildcats' season opener on 24 January, he recorded eight points and five rebounds off the bench in an 88–76 win over the South East Melbourne Phoenix. In April 2021, he played his 200th NBL game and 150th game for the Wildcats.

=== Rockingham Flames (2021–2023) ===
In July 2021, Jervis joined the Rockingham Flames for the rest of the 2021 NBL1 West season. He helped the Flames reach the grand final, where they lost 92–82 to the Perry Lakes Hawks, with Jervis recording 11 points and 10 rebounds in the loss. In 10 games, he averaged 14.2 points, 10.1 rebounds, 2.5 assists and 1.9 blocks per game.

In November 2021, Jervis re-signed with the Flames for the 2022 NBL1 West season. On 6 August 2022, he recorded 12 points, 14 rebounds and 10 assists in a 117–90 win over the Perth Redbacks. Later that month, he played his 200th SBL/NBL1 game. He helped the Flames reach a second straight grand final, where they defeated the Geraldton Buccaneers 91–79 to win the championship behind Jervis' 12 points, 10 rebounds and six assists. In 21 games, he averaged 13.33 points, 9.86 rebounds, 3.86 assists and 1.33 blocks per game. At the NBL1 National Finals, the team was crowned national champions with an 85–74 win over the Frankston Blues in the championship game.

In December 2022, Jervis re-signed with the Flames for the 2023 NBL1 West season. He helped the Flames win the minor premiership but they went on to lose to the Joondalup Wolves in the preliminary final. In 20 games, he averaged 12.2 points, 10.05 rebounds, 3.25 assists and 2.0 blocks per game. The Flames went on to reach the grand final of the NBL1 National Finals, where they lost 90–85 to the Knox Raiders. A week later, he played for the NBL1 West Select Team against the Perth Wildcats in two NBL pre-season games.

=== Clube Basket de Queluz (2026–present) ===
In September 2026, Jervis signed with Clube Basket de Queluz of the Portuguese Proliga, returning to play for the first time since 2023.

== National team career ==
In May 2014, Jervis made his international debut for the Australian Boomers in the team's Sino-Australia Challenge against China.

In June 2017, Jervis was named in a 20-man Boomers training camp squad ahead of the 2017 FIBA Asia Cup.

== Personal ==
In May 2015, Jervis married long-time partner Jazze McNeill. In August 2016, Jazze gave birth to Clementine. Jazze is a lawyer. With Jervis' return to the Perth Wildcats in May 2018, Jazze and Clementine remained in Brisbane.
