= Otago Gold Rush (basketball) =

- League: Women's Basketball Championship (formerly); National Basketball League (formerly)
- Location: Otago, New Zealand

Otago Gold Rush was a New Zealand women's basketball team. It won the Women's Basketball Championship (WBC) in 2011, 2015, and 2018.

They were later known as Firebrand Otago Gold Rush.
