= Stacey Barr =

Australian rules footballer and basketball player

No. 10 – East Perth Eagles
- Position: Guard
- League: NBL1 West

Personal information
- Born: 12 November 1992 (age 33) Melbourne, Victoria, Australia
- Listed height: 5 ft 8 in (1.73 m)

Career information
- High school: Maribyrnong College (Melbourne, Victoria)
- College: Idaho (2011–2015)
- WNBA draft: 2015: undrafted
- Playing career: 2015–present

Career history
- 2015: Geelong Supercats
- 2015–2016: Perth Lynx
- 2016: Kalamunda Eastern Suns
- 2017: Willetton Tigers
- 2018: East Perth Eagles
- 2018: Frankston Blues
- 2018–2019: Basket Esch
- 2019–2025: Warwick Senators
- 2026–present: East Perth Eagles

Career highlights
- NBL1 National champion (2022); NBL1 West champion (2022); 2× NBL1 West Most Valuable Player (2019, 2022); 5× All-NBL1 West First Team (2017, 2019, 2021–2023); 2× All-NBL1 West Second Team (2024, 2026); NBL1 West scoring champion (2022); NBL1 National Finals All-Star Five (2022); Second-team All-Big Sky Conference (2015); WAC Player of the Year (2014); First-team All-WAC (2014); Third-team All-WAC (2013); 2× WAC tournament MVP (2013, 2014)

Stacey Marie Barr (born 12 November 1992) is an Australian basketball player and former football player. She played college basketball in the United States for the University of Idaho before playing a season in the Women's National Basketball League (WNBL) for the Perth Lynx in 2015–16. She played two seasons for the Fremantle Football Club in the AFL Women's competition in 2017 and 2018 before returning to basketball.

In the NBL1 West, Barr is a two-time Most Valuable Player recipient (2019 and 2022) and has earned All-NBL1 West First Team selection five times. She helped the Warwick Senators win both the NBL1 West championship and NBL1 National championship in 2022.

== Early life ==
Barr was born in Melbourne, Victoria, where she attended Maribyrnong College. Between 2007 and 2009, she played in the Big V Division One for the Werribee Devils. In 2010 and 2011, she continued in the Big V Division One for the Altona Gators.

== College career ==
Barr moved to the United States in 2011 to play college basketball for the Idaho Vandals. In her freshman season in 2011–12, she was second on the team in scoring and fourth in rebounding after averaging 10.3 points and 4.1 rebounds per game. She played in all 31 games and made four starts. She scored in double figures 19 times and scored 20 or more points four times, including a career-high 23 points in the regular-season finale against Hawaii on 3 March 2012.

As a sophomore in 2012–13, Barr played in 30 total games and made 22 starts, finishing second on the team in scoring with 10.9 points and third with 5.3 rebounds alongside 1.7 assists per game. She scored a then-career-high 23 points on 5 January 2013 against Utah State, and tied for second in program history with six 3-pointers made in that game. She earned WAC tournament MVP honours after averaging 19.6 points and 7.7 rebounds per game during Idaho's championship run. She scored a career-high 26 points in Idaho's WAC semifinal win over Utah State on 15 March.

As a junior in 2013–14, Barr earned WAC Player of the Year honours after averaging 18.2 points, 7.7 rebounds and 2.7 assists in 34 games. She scored in double figures in 31-of-34 games and posted 20+ points in 16 games. She was named WAC tournament MVP for the second straight year after posting averages of 26.0 points, 5.7 rebounds and 3.0 assists per game, including a career-high 35 points in the WAC Semifinals against New Mexico State. During the season, she became the 19th Idaho women's basketball player to surpass the 1,000 career-point mark.

As a senior in 2014–15, Barr averaged a career-high 21.3 points per game and earned All-Big Sky Conference second team honours. She also averaged 6.7 rebounds, 2.2 assists and 1.3 steals per game in her 29 starts and totaled 74 3-pointers, setting a school record with 268 for her career. She scored 20 or more points in 21 games, including twice scoring a season high of 31 points. Barr became the fifth player in program history to pass the 1,500 point mark and finished her career as the fourth leading scorer in school history with 1,896 points.

== Professional and semi-pro career ==
On 4 June 2015, Barr signed with the Geelong Supercats of the South East Australian Basketball League (SEABL). In seven games to finish the 2015 SEABL season, she averaged 2.0 points per game.

On 10 June 2015, Barr signed with the Perth Lynx of the Women's National Basketball League (WNBL) for the 2015–16 season. In 12 games, she averaged 1.1 points per game.

Barr joined the Kalamunda Eastern Suns of the State Basketball League (SBL) for the 2016 season. In 19 games, she averaged 21.26 points, 5.68 rebounds and 3.53 assists per game.

Barr joined the Willetton Tigers for the 2017 SBL season. She was named SBL All-Star Five. In 25 games, she averaged 22.68 points, 6.2 rebounds and 2.84 assists per game.

Barr played two games for the East Perth Eagles to start the 2018 SBL season before joining the Frankston Blues for the 2018 SEABL season. In 15 SEABL games for the Blues, she averaged 20.9 points, 6.4 rebounds and 3.6 assists per game.

Barr joined Basket Esch in Luxembourg for the 2018–19 season. In 18 games, she averaged 23.2 points, 7.5 rebounds and 1.8 assists per game.

In the 2019 SBL season, Barr helped the Warwick Senators reach the grand final, where they lost 85–56 to the Rockingham Flames despite her team-high 16 points. She was named the recipient of the State Basketball League Most Valuable Player Award and earned All-SBL First Team honours. In 25 games, she averaged 23.12 points, 7.28 rebounds and 3.48 assists per game.

Barr returned to the Warwick Senators in 2020 and played in the West Coast Classic. In 12 games, she averaged 23.92 points, 7.75 rebounds and 3.92 assists per game. With the Senators in the inaugural NBL1 West season in 2021, she earned All-NBL1 West First Team honours. In 21 games, she averaged 22.71 points, 8.52 rebounds, 4.67 assists and 1.57 steals per game.

In the 2022 NBL1 West season, Barr was named the recipient of the NBL1 West Most Valuable Player Award and earned All-NBL1 West First Team honours and was the league's leading scorer. She helped the Senators reach the NBL1 West Grand Final, where they defeated the Willetton Tigers 87–61 to win the NBL1 West championship. Barr scored a game-high 23 points. In 22 games, she averaged 25.27 points, 7.5 rebounds, 4.68 assists and 2.68 steals per game. At the 2022 NBL1 National Finals in Melbourne, she helped the Senators win the NBL1 National championship with 17 points in the championship game against the Ringwood Hawks. She was named to the NBL1 National Finals All-Star Five.

On 2 June 2023, Barr scored 51 points in the Senators' 87–58 win over the Perth Redbacks. For the 2023 season, she earned All-NBL1 West First Team honours. In 18 games, she averaged 20.94 points, 5.94 rebounds, 4.22 assists and 1.67 steals per game.

With the Senators in the 2024 season, Barr earned All-NBL1 West Second Team honours. In 20 games, she averaged 17.55 points, 6.15 rebounds, 4.85 assists and 2.25 steals per game.

In the 2025 season, Barr helped the Senators return to the NBL1 West Grand Final, where they lost 91–71 to the Cockburn Cougars despite her game-high 35 points and 13 rebounds. In 18 games, she averaged 23.06 points, 7.83 rebounds, 4.11 assists and 2.06 steals per game.

Barr joined the East Perth Eagles for the 2026 NBL1 West season. She was named team captain. She was named to the All-NBL1 West Second Team. In 21 games, she averaged 19.9 points, 8.48 rebounds, 6.38 assists and 1.76 steals per game.

== Football career ==
Stacey Barr
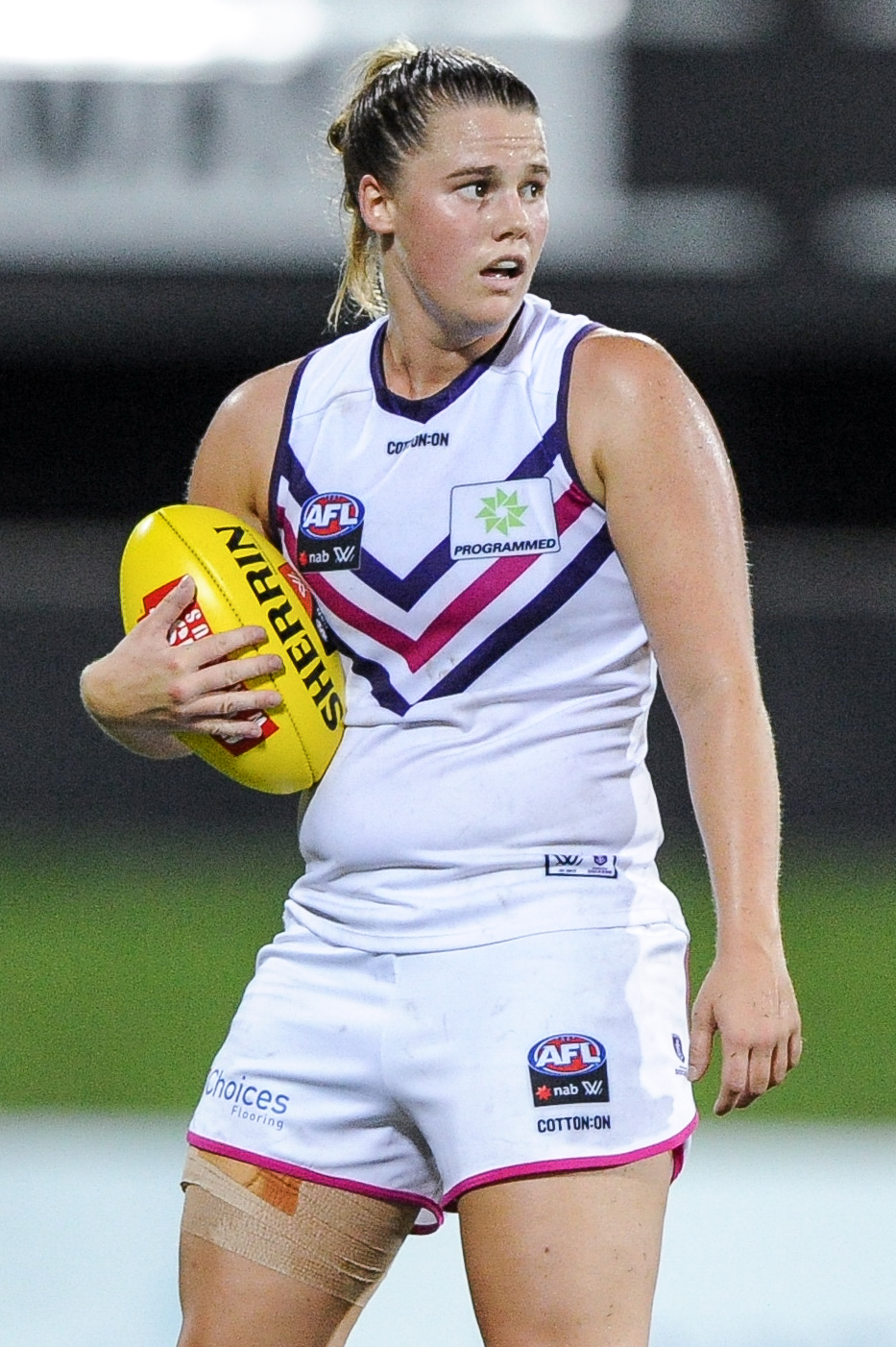
- Barr playing for Fremantle in January 2018

Personal information
- Born: 12 November 1992 (age 33)
- Original team: Swan Districts (WAWFL)
- Draft: No. 68, 2016 AFL Women's draft
- Debut: Round 1, 2017, Fremantle vs. Western Bulldogs, at VU Whitten Oval
- Height: 170 cm (5 ft 7 in)
- Position: Defender

Playing career^{1}
Years	Club	Games (Goals)
2017–2018	Fremantle	12 (5)
- ^{1} Playing statistics correct to the end of the 2018 season.

Barr played a year of junior football in under-10s for Braybrook in Melbourne's western suburbs.

After not receiving a contract extension with the Perth Lynx in 2016, Barr started rediscovering her love of football and had a brief stint in the West Australian Women's Football League (WAWFL) for Swan Districts. As a half-forward, her strength was overhead marking.

Barr was drafted by Fremantle with their ninth selection and sixty-eighth overall in the 2016 AFL Women's draft. She made her debut in the thirty-two point loss to the Western Bulldogs at VU Whitten Oval in the opening round of the 2017 season. She played every match in her debut season to finish with seven matches. She was delisted by Fremantle at the end of the 2018 season.

== Personal life ==
In 2026, Barr married long-time partner Ash.
