= Marshall Nelson =

Australian basketball player (born 1994)

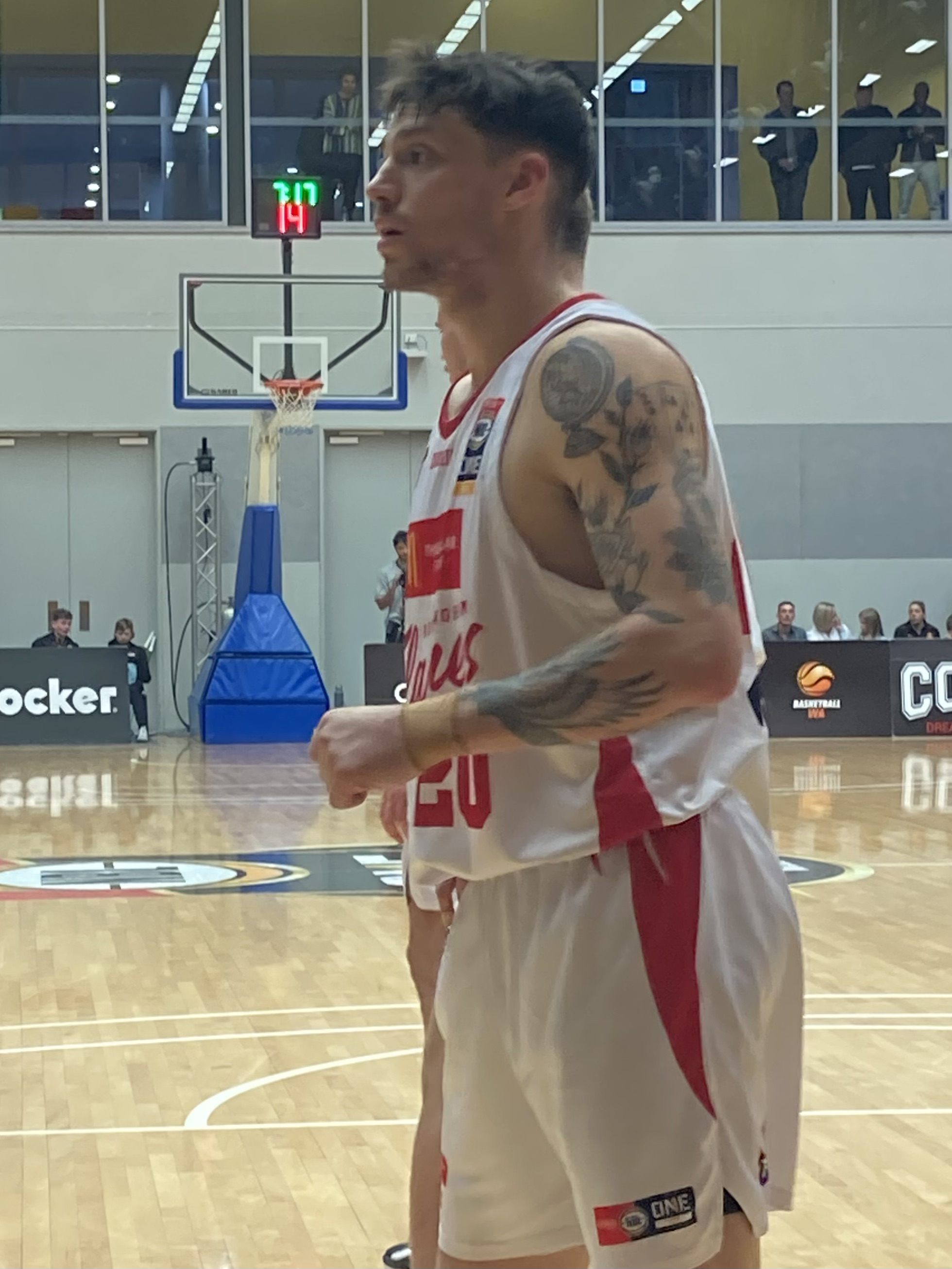
- Nelson in September 2022

Personal information
- Born: 31 January 1994 (age 32) Minnesota, United States
- Listed height: 184 cm (6 ft 0 in)
- Listed weight: 85 kg (187 lb)

Career information
- High school: Lesmurdie Senior (Perth, Western Australia)
- College: CC of Rhode Island (2014–2015); Wayland Baptist (2015–2017)
- NBA draft: 2018: undrafted
- Playing career: 2014–present
- Position: Point guard / shooting guard

Career history
- 2014–2015: Perth Redbacks
- 2017: Perth Redbacks
- 2017–2019: Illawarra Hawks
- 2018: Canberra Gunners
- 2019–2021: Perth Redbacks
- 2019–2020: Jämtland Basket
- 2021: U.M.F. Grindavík
- 2021–2022: Cairns Taipans
- 2022–2023: Rockingham Flames
- 2024: Willetton Tigers
- 2024: PSA Sant'Antimo
- 2025: Kalamunda Eastern Suns
- 2026: Perth Redbacks

Career highlights
- NBL1 National champion (2022); 2× NBL1 National Finals All-Star Five (2022, 2023); 2× SBL / NBL1 West champion (2017, 2022); 2× All-SBL / NBL1 West First Team (2019, 2022); SBL scoring champion (2019); Region 21 NJCAA all-conference (2015)

Marshall Lance Nelson (born 31 January 1994) is an Australian-Belgian professional basketball player who last played for the Perth Redbacks of the NBL1 West. He began his career with the Redbacks in the State Basketball League (SBL) in 2014 before playing three seasons of college basketball in the United States for the Community College of Rhode Island and Wayland Baptist University. In 2017, he joined the Illawarra Hawks of the National Basketball League (NBL) as a development player, where he spent two seasons. He made a return to the NBL in the 2021–22 season, joining the Cairns Taipans as an injury replacement. He has also played in Sweden, Iceland and Italy.

Nelson helped the Redbacks win the SBL championship in 2017, and in 2022, he helped the Rockingham Flames win the NBL1 West championship and the NBL1 National championship.

== Early life ==
Nelson was born in the U.S. state of Minnesota and moved to Perth, Western Australia, when he was four years old. He attended Lesmurdie Senior High School and played in the Western Australian Basketball League (WABL) for the Kalamunda Eastern Suns as a junior.

== Basketball career ==
=== Early years in SBL and college (2014–2017) ===
Nelson debuted in the State Basketball League (SBL) in 2014 for the Perth Redbacks. In 30 games, he averaged 7.9 points, 2.63 rebounds and 1.07 assists per game.

For the 2014–15 U.S. college season, Nelson played for Community College of Rhode Island and earned Region 21 NJCAA all-conference honours. In the final game of the season, he scored a season-high 22 points. In 24 games, he averaged 9.7 points, 4.3 rebounds and 1.6 assists per game.

In May 2015, Nelson re-joined the Perth Redbacks. In 12 games to finish the 2015 SBL season, he averaged 11.0 points, 4.5 rebounds and 1.33 assists per game.

For the 2015–16 U.S. college season, Nelson transferred to Wayland Baptist University of the National Association of Intercollegiate Athletics (NAIA). He played in 32 games for the Pioneers and averaged 9.8 points, 2.7 rebounds and 1.4 assists per game. He helped the Pioneers win the 2016 Sooner Athletic Conference (SAC) finals.

Nelson continued on with Wayland Baptist for the 2016–17 season. On 10 December 2016, he scored 43 points a 102–99 overtime win over Sul Ross State. It was the most scored by a Pioneer in the 21st century and was just seven off the school record of 50 points set in 1955–56. He was subsequently named SAC Player of the Week. In 20 games, he averaged 12.1 points, 2.3 rebounds and 2.45 assists per game.

In May 2017, Nelson re-joined the Perth Redbacks. He helped the Redbacks reach the SBL Grand Final, where they defeated the Joondalup Wolves 103–70 to win the championship. Nelson recorded 17 points, four assists and three rebounds in the grand final with 14 of those points coming in the second half. In 20 games to finish the 2017 SBL season, he averaged 15.45 points, 4.55 rebounds and 3.3 assists per game.

=== Illawarra Hawks and Canberra Gunners (2017–2019) ===
Following the SBL season, Nelson moved to Wollongong to join the Illawarra Hawks as a development player for the 2017–18 NBL season. After not playing during the NBL season, the Hawks sent him to play with the Canberra Gunners in the SEABL for the 2018 season. The Gunners finished with 20 losses and zero wins, as Nelson averaged 16.1 points and 3.2 assists in his 15 games.

Nelson continued on with the Hawks as a development player, this time on a contract, in the 2018–19 NBL season. In 15 games, he averaged 2.2 points and 1.2 rebounds per game.

=== Perth Redbacks and Europe (2019–2021) ===
In March 2019, Nelson returned to the Perth Redbacks for the 2019 SBL season. He averaged a league-leading 27.96 points per game and earned All-SBL First Team honours. In 24 games, he also averaged 6.33 rebounds and 4.62 assists.

On 29 November 2019, Nelson signed with Jämtland Basket of the Swedish Basketball League for the rest of the 2019–20 season. In 14 games, he averaged 8.6 points, 3.0 rebounds, 2.9 assists and 1.4 steals per game.

Nelson was set to play for the Bendigo Braves in the 2020 NBL1 South season, but due to the COVID-19 pandemic, the NBL1 season was cancelled. He subsequently returned to Perth and played for the Redbacks in the West Coast Classic. He appeared in all 13 games, averaging 21.92 points, 6.92 rebounds and 4.62 assists per game.

On 3 February 2021, Nelson signed with U.M.F. Grindavík of the Icelandic top-tier Úrvalsdeild karla for the rest of the 2020–21 season. He broke his finger in April and subsequently returned to Perth. In eight games, he averaged 16.5 points, 3.9 rebounds, 5.9 assists and 1.4 steals per game.

In June 2021, Nelson joined the Redbacks for the rest of the 2021 NBL1 West season. In 14 games, he averaged 20.07 points, 6.42 rebounds and 4.92 assists per game.

=== Cairns Taipans (2021–2022) ===
On 30 December 2021, Nelson signed with the Cairns Taipans as an injury replacement for Scott Machado. He made his debut for the Taipans the next day, recording two points and two rebounds in five minutes off the bench in an 84–78 loss to the Perth Wildcats. He was released from the Taipans roster on 17 March 2022. In 10 games during the 2021–22 NBL season, he averaged 3.3 points, 1.1 rebounds and 1.0 assists per game.

=== Rockingham Flames (2022–2023) ===
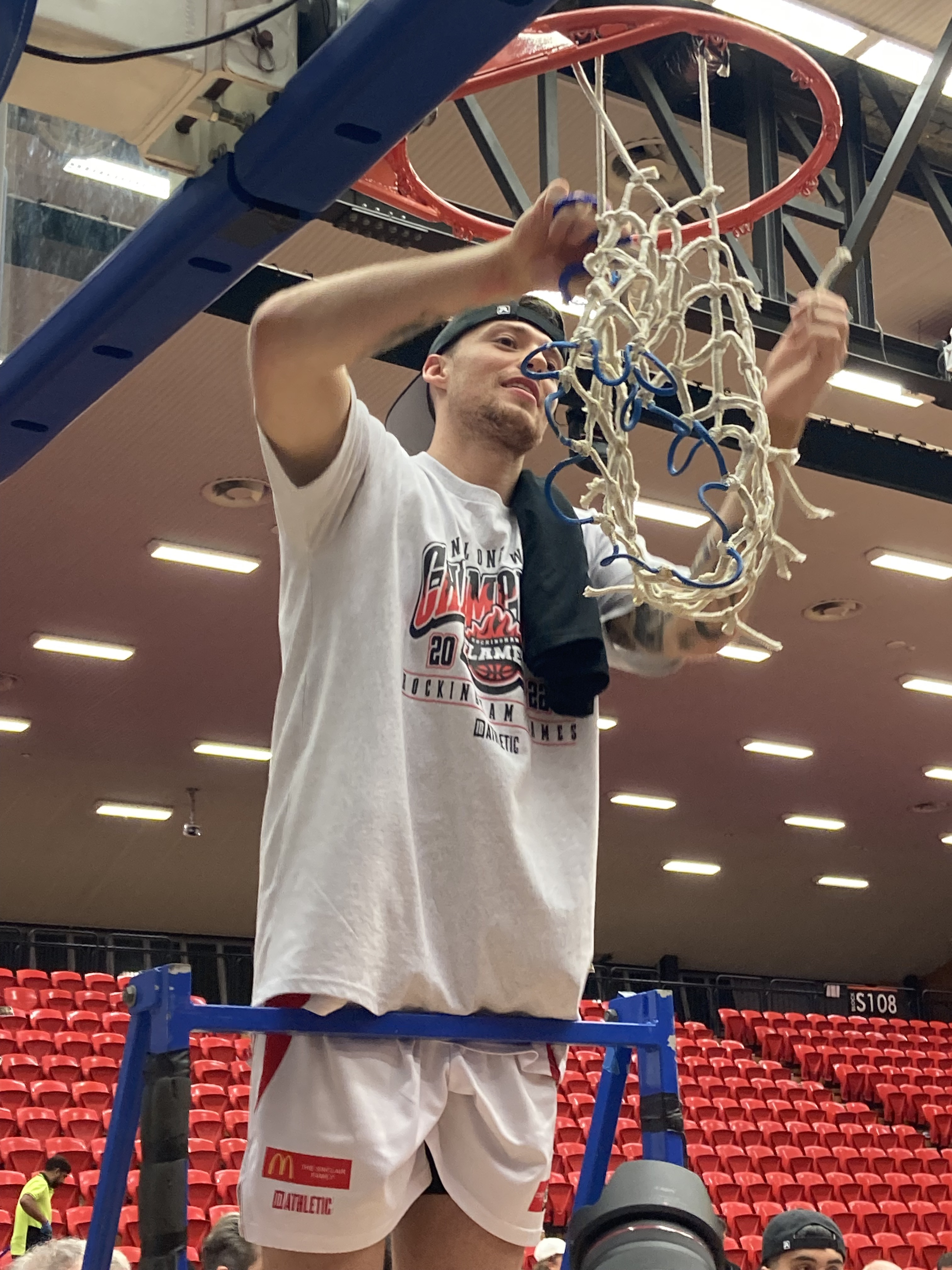
Nelson in September 2022 following the NBL1 West Grand Final

Nelson joined the Rockingham Flames for the 2022 NBL1 West season. On 28 May, he scored 39 points in an 81–65 win over the Willetton Tigers. On 24 June, he recorded 26 points, 10 rebounds and 12 assists in a 102–93 loss to the Perry Lakes Hawks. On 1 July, he scored 39 points in a 114–110 overtime win over the Perth Redbacks. He helped the Flames finish the regular season in second place with an 18–4 record and helped guide them to the NBL1 West Grand Final, where they defeated the Geraldton Buccaneers 91–79 to win the championship behind Nelson's 19 points. For the season, he earned All-NBL1 West First Team honours. In 20 games, he averaged 21.85 points, 6.5 rebounds, 4.5 assists and 1.25 steals per game. At the NBL1 National Finals, the team was crowned national champions with an 85–74 win over the Frankston Blues in the championship game. He was named to the NBL1 National Finals All-Star Five.

In November 2022, Nelson re-signed with the Flames for the 2023 NBL1 West season. He helped the Flames win the minor premiership but they went on to lose to the Joondalup Wolves in the preliminary final. In 23 games, he averaged 15.78 points, 4.22 rebounds, 6.17 assists and 1.09 steals per game. The Flames went on to reach the grand final of the NBL1 National Finals, where they lost 90–85 to the Knox Raiders. Nelson was named to the NBL1 National Finals All-Star Five for the second straight year. A week later, he played for the NBL1 West Select Team against the Perth Wildcats in two NBL pre-season games.

=== Willetton Tigers (2024) ===
After initially re-signing with the Flames, Nelson joined the Willetton Tigers in April 2024 for the 2024 NBL1 West season. In the Tigers' semi-final on 1 August, Nelson scored 48 points with eight 3-pointers in a 108–103 win over the Flames. In the preliminary final two days later, he had 26 points and nine assists in a 98–89 win over the Geraldton Buccaneers. In the grand final, he scored 19 points in a 91–89 loss to the Mandurah Magic. In 23 games, he averaged 19.0 points, 5.5 rebounds, 5.2 assists and 1.3 steals per game. Following the season, he once again played for the NBL1 West Select Team against the Perth Wildcats in two NBL pre-season games.

=== PSA Sant'Antimo (2024) ===
In July 2024, Nelson signed with PSA Sant'Antimo of the Italian Serie B Basket for the 2024–25 season. He left the team in December 2024 after averaging 16.5 points, 4.6 rebounds, 2.8 assists and 1.1 steals in 16 games.

=== Kalamunda Eastern Suns (2025) ===
In February 2025, Nelson signed with the Kalamunda Eastern Suns for the 2025 NBL1 West season. He formed a backcourt duo with Terrico White. On 13 June, Nelson scored 50 points with eight 3-pointers in a 106–91 win over the Perth Redbacks. In 19 games, he averaged 24.58 points, 6.79 rebounds, 5.37 assists and 2.21 steals per game.

=== Return to Perth Redbacks (2026) ===
In November 2025, Nelson signed with the Perth Redbacks for the 2026 NBL1 West season. He appeared in eight games between 27 March and 23 May, averaging 19.88 points, 4.88 rebounds, 4.75 assists and 1.63 steals per game.

== National team career ==
In August 2022, Nelson played in a number of exhibition games for the Belgium national team.

== Personal life ==
Nelson has Belgian citizenship.
