= Josh Ritchart =

American basketball player (born 1992)

Personal information
- Born: March 11, 1992 (age 34) Mountain View, California, U.S.
- Listed height: 6 ft 9 in (2.06 m)
- Listed weight: 235 lb (107 kg)

Career information
- High school: Forest Lake Christian (Auburn, California)
- College: UC Davis (2010–2015)
- NBA draft: 2015: undrafted
- Playing career: 2015–2019
- Position: Power forward

Career history
- 2015–2016: Bambitious Nara
- 2016: Koroivos Amaliadas
- 2017: Malbas
- 2018–2019: Rockingham Flames

Career highlights
- 2× SBL All-Star (2018, 2019); Second-team All-Big West (2015); Big West Freshman of the Year (2011)

Josh Ritchart (born March 11, 1992) is an American former professional basketball player. After five years at UC Davis, Ritchart began his professional career in Japan, before splitting the 2016–17 season in Greece and Sweden. In 2018, he moved to Australia and joined the Rockingham Flames of the State Basketball League (SBL).

== High school career ==
Ritchart played high school basketball at Forest Lake Christian, in Auburn, California.

== College career ==
Ritchart played college basketball at UC Davis from 2010 to 2015.

== Professional career ==
In July 2015, Ritchart signed with Bambitious Nara of the Japanese bj league. In 49 games for Nara in 2016–17, he averaged 11.5 points and 6.9 rebounds per game.

In August 2016, Ritchart signed with Koroivos Amaliadas of the Greek Basket League. He left the team in November 2016 after appearing in five games. In January 2017, Ritchart signed with Malbas of the Swedish Basketligan. In 11 games, he averaged 12.5 points and 5.7 rebounds per game.

In January 2018, Ritchart signed with the Rockingham Flames of the State Basketball League. He averaged 26.3 points, 7.3 rebounds, 2.1 assists and 1.5 blocks in 10 games before being ruled out for the rest of the season in early May with a foot injury.

On October 31, 2018, Ritchart re-signed with the Flames for the 2019 SBL season. In June 2019, he competed in the SBL All-Star Game. Later that month, he sustained a calf injury that saw him sit out for nearly two months. In 20 games, he averaged 19.8 points, 6.8 rebounds and 1.75 assists per game.

In January 2020, Ritchart re-signed with the Flames for the 2020 season. Due to the COVID-19 pandemic, the season was cancelled.
