= 2016–17 Perth Wildcats season =

- Head coach: Trevor Gleeson
- Captain: Damian Martin
- Arena: Perth Arena

NBL results
- Record: 15–13 (53.6%)
- Ladder: 3rd
- Finals finish: Champions
- Stats at NBL.com.au

The 2016–17 NBL season was the 36th season for the Perth Wildcats in the National Basketball League (NBL).

== Season synopsis ==
The 2016 off-season saw the Wildcats part ways with Tom Jervis, Jermaine Beal (both to Brisbane) and Nathan Jawai (Cairns)—three cogs in the team's seventh championship. The trio was replaced with Angus Brandt (Sydney), Jaron Johnson (NBA D-League) and Jameel McKay (college). With the NBL altering its import restriction in 2016 from two to three foreign-born players, the Wildcats were also able to retain Casey Prather for the 2016–17 season. In addition, the Wildcats signed 2015–16 training player Dexter Kernich-Drew to a full-time contract, and retained the core group behind captain and Olympian Damian Martin. In an all too recurring theme for the Wildcats however, big man Matthew Knight injured his right shoulder at training in early September and was ruled out for two months. To replace him, the team recruited former Adelaide 36ers forward Lucas Walker.

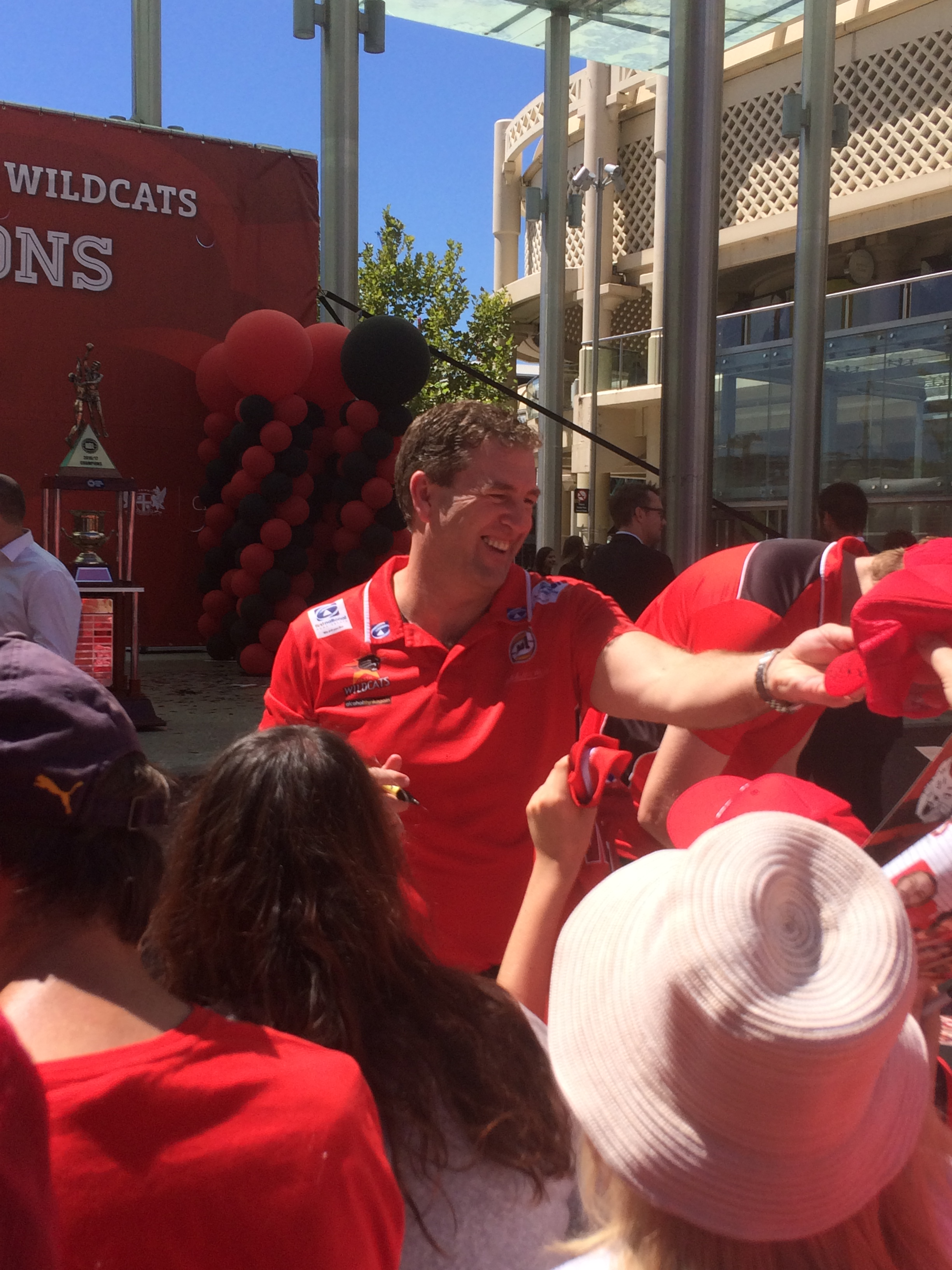
Trevor Gleeson became the most decorated Wildcats coach in 2017 after winning his third title

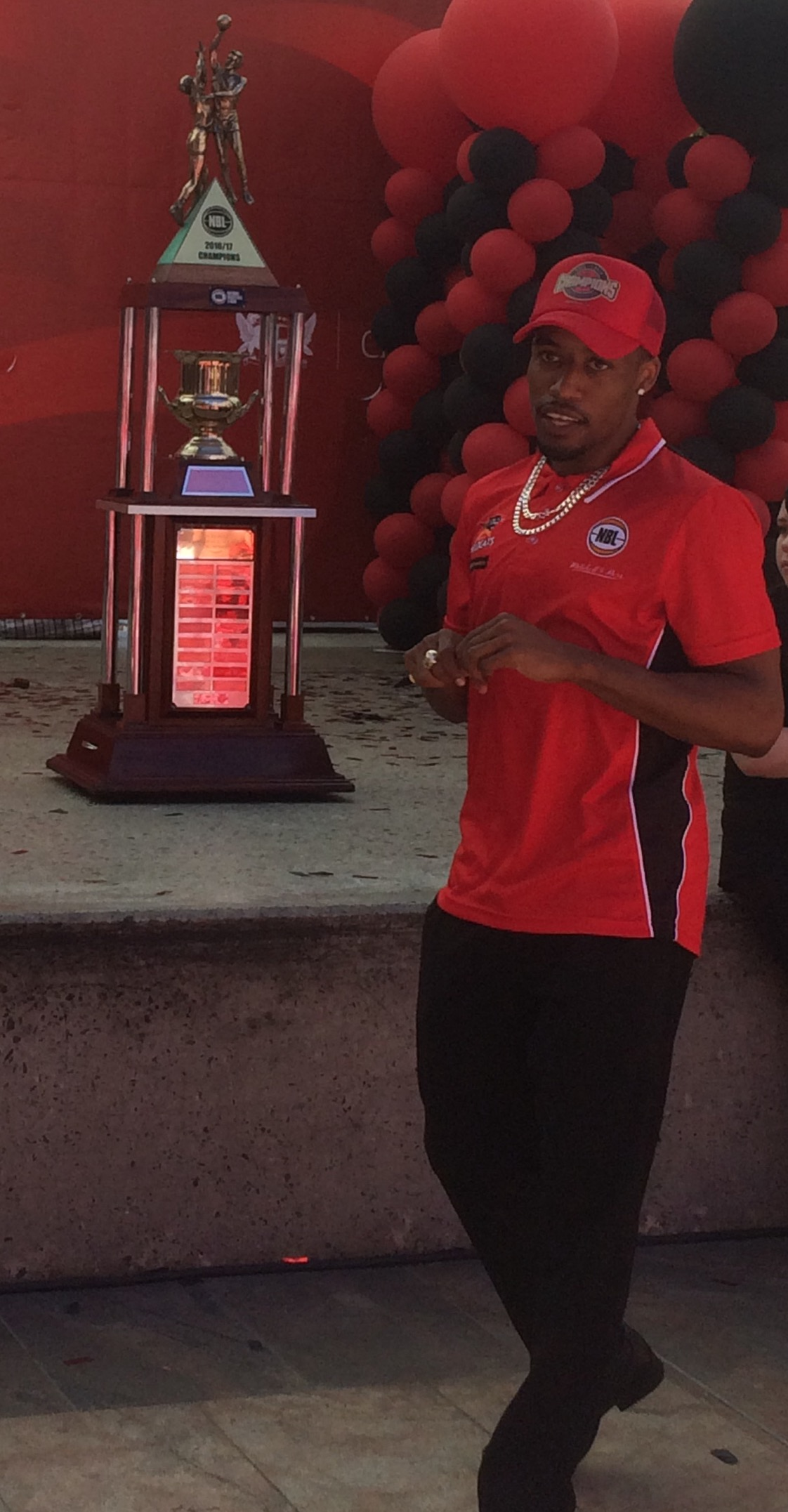
Bryce Cotton on 6 March 2017, a day after scoring 45 points in Game 3 of the 2017 NBL Grand Final series.

After a lacklustre season opener in Brisbane against the reintroduced Brisbane Bullets on 6 October, in which they were defeated 72–65, the Wildcats turned it on two days later in Perth to defeat the Cairns Taipans 84–74 in overtime. The hero of the game was Jaron Johnson, who, after struggling over the first three quarters of the game, stepped up his play in the fourth quarter to nail four triples, including a game-typing three-pointer that sent the game into overtime. Just three games into the season, the Wildcats felt Johnson was not the right fit for the team and replaced him with three-point specialist Andre Ingram. However, Ingram managed just two games for the Wildcats before leaving Perth due to mental health concerns. Injuries to Martin (jaw & knee) and Kenny (groin) left the Wildcats no choice but to reactivate Johnson's contract, elevate development player Corban Wroe, and sign Jackson Hussey. Martin's absence throughout November and December showed, as the Wildcats dropped from a 4–1 record to 7–9 (last place) following a Round 12 loss to Adelaide. As a result of their poor run of form—losing six of their previous seven games and recording a 1–6 road record on the season—the team made the tough decision to release Johnson for a second time just two days before Christmas. Johnson's replacement, Bryce Cotton, made an immediate impact with 26 points on 7 January against Sydney—the most by a Wildcat on NBL debut, surpassing James Ennis' 25-point NBL debut with the Wildcats in 2013.

A rejuvenated Wildcats side, led by Prather, Cotton and Martin (who returned from injury on 7 January), finished their annual five-game road stretch in December and January with a three-game winning streak, lifting them from last place to second place with a 10–9 record. Their 72–68 victory over the Bullets on 9 January marked the first time in three years that the team managed to win three consecutive games on the road. Coming into the final round of the regular season, the Wildcats had a 13–13 record and needed to win both of their Round 19 games to cement a place in the finals. Behind a 55-point weekend from Prather, the Wildcats were successful in defeating Sydney and Melbourne, extending their NBL Finals streak to 31 seasons by sneaking into third spot. The Cotton-Prather duo went on to lead the Wildcats to a Game 1 semi-final win over the second-seeded Taipans in Cairns, with Cotton (34 points) scoring the most points by a Wildcat in a post-season game since Shawn Redhage's 35-point effort in 2008. In Game 2, Prather (24 points, 10 rebounds) and Jesse Wagstaff (20 points, five threes) led the Wildcats to a 74–66 win. The series sweep earned the Wildcats a trip to their sixth NBL Grand Final in eight years and their 13th in franchise history. The Wildcats were matched-up with the fourth-seeded Illawarra Hawks in the grand final, after they defeated the Adelaide 36ers—who were minor premiers—in their semi-final series. As a result, the Wildcats attained home-court advantage in the best-of-five grand final series; the NBL opted for a best-of-five series for the first time since 2009. The Wildcats went on to sweep the Hawks 3–0 to claim their eighth title, going back-to-back for the first time since 1990/1991. Bryce Cotton was named Grand Final MVP after averaging 27.7 points over the three games, including a 45-point effort in Game 3, setting the new all-time Grand Final scoring record in NBL history.

The Wildcats won seven straight games to finish the 2016–17 season and amassed a 13–4 record between 31 December and 5 March, after starting out 7–9 and being ruled out of playoff contention in December. By going back-to-back in 2017, the Wildcats defended their title for just the second in their history, while Trevor Gleeson became the first Wildcats coach to guide the team to a successful title-defence campaign.

== Roster ==
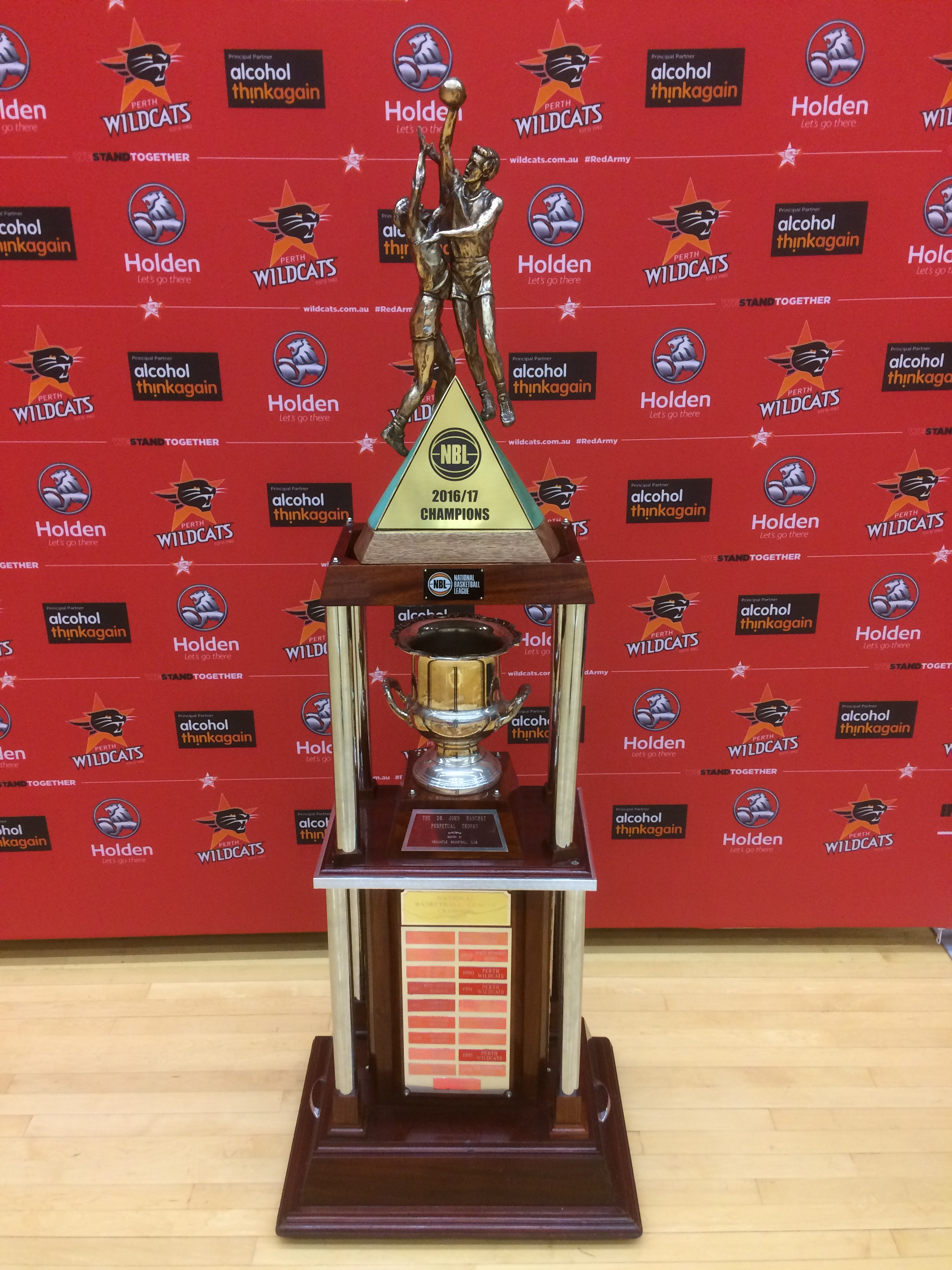
The Wildcats' 2017 championship trophy

Note: Flags indicate national team eligibility at FIBA-sanctioned events. Players may hold other non-FIBA nationalities not displayed.

Perth Wildcats roster
Players
Coaches

Pos.	No.	Nat.	Name	Ht.	Wt.
G	0	(United States)	Cotton, Bryce (I)	1.85 m (6 ft 1 in)	75 kg (165 lb)
F	2	(Australia)	Walker, Lucas (TP)	2.02 m (6 ft 8 in)	102 kg (225 lb)
G/F	4	(Australia)	Hire, Greg	2.01 m (6 ft 7 in)	99 kg (218 lb)
F/C	5	(United States)	McKay, Jameel (I)	2.06 m (6 ft 9 in)	96 kg (212 lb)
G	8	(New Zealand)	Kenny, Jarrod	1.88 m (6 ft 2 in)	87 kg (192 lb)
F/C	9	(Australia)	Knight, Matthew	2.04 m (6 ft 8 in)	109 kg (240 lb)
G	10	(Australia)	Kernich-Drew, Dexter	1.98 m (6 ft 6 in)	83 kg (183 lb)
G	11	(Australia)	Bragg, Mason (DP)	1.82 m (6 ft 0 in)	75 kg (165 lb)
C	12	(Australia)	Brandt, Angus	2.08 m (6 ft 10 in)	110 kg (243 lb)
G/F	23	(United States)	Prather, Casey (I)	1.98 m (6 ft 6 in)	94 kg (207 lb)
F	24	(Australia)	Wagstaff, Jesse	2.03 m (6 ft 8 in)	100 kg (220 lb)
F	25	(Australia)	Vague, Rhys (DP)	2.04 m (6 ft 8 in)
F	42	(Australia)	Redhage, Shawn	2.03 m (6 ft 8 in)	103 kg (227 lb)
G	44	(Australia)	Wroe, Corban (DP)	1.85 m (6 ft 1 in)	86 kg (190 lb)
G	53	(Australia)	Martin, Damian (C)	1.86 m (6 ft 1 in)	92 kg (203 lb)

Head coach

- (Australia) Trevor Gleeson

Assistant coach(es)

- (Australia) Matthew Nielsen
- (Australia) Adam Forde
- (Australia) Jamie O'Loughlin

Strength & conditioning coach(es)

- (Australia) Josh Cavanagh

Legend

- (C) Team captain
- (DP) Development player
- (I) Import player
- (TP) Training player
- Injured

- Roster
Updated: 3 January 2017

== Ladder ==
Pos	2016–17 NBL season											
Pos	Team	Pld	W	L	PCT	Last 5	Streak	Home	Away	PF	PA	PP
1	Adelaide 36ers	28	17	11	60.71%	1–4	L4	9–5	8–6	2582	2505	103.07%
2	Cairns Taipans^{1}	28	15	13	53.57%	4–1	W3	10–4	5–9	2305	2301	100.17%
3	Perth Wildcats^{1}	28	15	13	53.57%	4–1	W2	10–4	5–9	2294	2257	101.64%
4	Illawarra Hawks^{1}	28	15	13	53.57%	3–2	W1	9–5	6–8	2486	2444	101.72%
5	New Zealand Breakers	28	14	14	50.00%	3–2	W2	9–5	5–9	2353	2387	98.58%
6	Melbourne United^{2}	28	13	15	46.43%	2–3	L2	9–5	4–10	2351	2337	100.60%
7	Sydney Kings^{2}	28	13	15	46.43%	2–3	L2	7–7	6–8	2295	2311	99.31%
8	Brisbane Bullets	28	10	18	35.71%	1–4	L4	6–8	4–10	2268	2392	94.82%

Updated to match(es) played on 12 February 2017. Source: NBL.com.au

=== Ladder progression ===
- Numbers highlighted in green indicate that the team finished the round inside the top four.
- Numbers highlighted in blue indicates the team finished first on the ladder in that round.
- Numbers highlighted in red indicates the team finished last place on the ladder in that round.

2016–17 NBL season
Team	1	2	3	4	5	6	7	8	9	10	11	12	13	14	15	16	17	18	19
Adelaide 36ers	5	6	4	4	6	7	8	7	5	2	1	1	1	1	1	1	1	1	1
Brisbane Bullets	2	2	3	3	5	4	2	3	2	6	4	7	5	6	8	8	8	8	8
Cairns Taipans	8	8	8	7	4	6	6	6	4	8	6	6	8	7	7	7	4	5	2
Illawarra Hawks	1	7	7	8	7	5	5	4	3	3	2	2	3	3	2	2	2	2	4
Melbourne United	7	4	5	5	8	8	7	8	6	5	8	4	2	4	3	4	7	3	6
New Zealand Breakers	3	5	6	6	3	3	4	5	8	7	5	5	7	8	6	3	6	7	5
Perth Wildcats	4	3	2	2	2	2	3	2	7	4	7	8	6	2	5	5	5	4	3
Sydney Kings	6	1	1	1	1	1	1	1	1	1	3	3	4	5	4	6	3	6	7
