= 2019 State Basketball League season =

- League: State Basketball League
- Sport: Basketball
- Duration: 15 March – 28 July (Regular season); 2 August – 31 August (Finals)
- Number of games: 26 (men); 22 (women)
- Number of teams: 14 (men); 12 (women)

Regular season
- Minor premiers: M: Joondalup Wolves; W: Lakeside Lightning
- Season MVP: M: Joshua Braun (Suns); W: Stacey Barr (Senators)
- Top scorer: M: Marshall Nelson (Redbacks); W: Darcee Garbin (Flames)

Finals
- Champions: M: Geraldton Buccaneers; W: Rockingham Flames
- Runners-up: M: Joondalup Wolves; W: Warwick Senators
- Grand Final MVP: M: Liam Hunt (Buccaneers); W: Maddison Allen (Flames)

SBL seasons
- ← 2018 2020 →

The 2019 State Basketball League season was the 31st season of the State Basketball League (SBL). The regular season began on Friday 15 March and ended on Sunday 28 July. The finals began on Friday 2 August and concluded with the women's grand final on Friday 30 August and the men's grand final on Saturday 31 August.

== Pre-season ==
The 2019 SBL Pre-Season Blitz was held at Warwick Stadium over Saturday 2 March and Sunday 3 March.

== Regular season ==
The regular season began on Friday 15 March and ended on Sunday 28 July after 20 rounds of competition. Easter games in round 6 were again scheduled for Thursday night, with all teams then on a break over the long weekend. Games tipped-off again on Anzac Day as the tradition continued between the Kalamunda Eastern Suns and Willetton Tigers. There was also Women's Round in round 9 and Heritage Round in round 16, while the new concept of Mental Health Awareness Round was included for round 19.

Changes for the 2019 season saw the Stirling Senators rebrand as the Warwick Senators, while the East Perth Eagles relocated from Morley Sport & Recreation Centre to Herb Graham Recreation Centre.

=== Standings ===
Men's ladder

Pos	Team	W	L	Pts	Qualification
1	Joondalup Wolves	20	6	40	Quarter Finals
2	Lakeside Lightning	20	6	40	Quarter Finals
3	Geraldton Buccaneers	19	7	38	Quarter Finals
4	Rockingham Flames	18	8	36	Quarter Finals
5	Perry Lakes Hawks	18	8	36	Quarter Finals
6	Warwick Senators	16	10	32	Quarter Finals
7	Goldfields Giants	14	12	28	Quarter Finals
8	Kalamunda Eastern Suns	13	13	26	Quarter Finals
9	Willetton Tigers	13	13	26	
10	Perth Redbacks	11	15	22	
11	Cockburn Cougars	7	19	14	
12	East Perth Eagles	6	20	12	
13	Mandurah Magic	6	20	12	
14	South West Slammers	1	25	2	

Source: State Basketball League

Women's ladder

Pos	Team	W	L	Pts	Qualification
1	Lakeside Lightning	16	6	32	Quarter Finals
2	Mandurah Magic	15	7	30	Quarter Finals
3	Joondalup Wolves	14	8	28	Quarter Finals
4	Warwick Senators	14	8	28	Quarter Finals
5	Willetton Tigers	13	9	26	Quarter Finals
6	Perry Lakes Hawks	13	9	26	Quarter Finals
7	Rockingham Flames	13	9	26	Quarter Finals
8	Kalamunda Eastern Suns	11	11	22	Quarter Finals
9	Perth Redbacks	9	13	18	
10	South West Slammers	8	14	16	
11	Cockburn Cougars	5	17	10	
12	East Perth Eagles	1	21	2	

Source: State Basketball League

== Finals ==
The finals began on Friday 2 August and consisted of three rounds. The finals concluded with the women's grand final on Friday 30 August and the men's grand final on Saturday 31 August.

=== Men's bracket ===
Quarter Finals
1	Joondalup Wolves	112	113	X
8	Kalamunda Eastern Suns	97	84	X
4	Rockingham Flames	81	86	X
5	Perry Lakes Hawks	89	89	X
2	Lakeside Lightning	89	102	X
7	Goldfields Giants	85	84	X
3	Geraldton Buccaneers	94	75	79
6	Warwick Senators	84	83	68

Semi Finals
1	Joondalup Wolves	81	109	X
5	Perry Lakes Hawks	77	94	X
2	Lakeside Lightning	68	96	86
3	Geraldton Buccaneers	79	89	96

Grand Final
Joondalup Wolves	80	X	X
Geraldton Buccaneers	92	X	X

==== Grand Final summary ====
31 August 2019
7:30 pm

Box score
Report
Highlights
Game replay

Joondalup Wolves 80, Geraldton Buccaneers 92
Scoring by quarter: 25–26, 12–21, 19–22, 24–23
Pts: Robert Huntington 21; Rebs: Earnest Ross 12; Asts: Earnest Ross 4	Pts: Liam Hunt 24; Rebs: Liam Hunt 10; Asts: Hunt, Ducas 4 each
Geraldton wins SBL Championship

Bendat Basketball Centre, Floreat
MVP: Liam Hunt (Buccaneers)

=== Women's bracket ===
Quarter Finals
1	Lakeside Lightning	85	91	X
8	Kalamunda Eastern Suns	77	81	X
4	Warwick Senators	84	88	X
5	Willetton Tigers	74	58	X
2	Mandurah Magic	65	64	X
7	Rockingham Flames	76	65	X
3	Joondalup Wolves	66	59	X
6	Perry Lakes Hawks	102	103	X

Semi Finals
1	Lakeside Lightning	75	65	X
4	Warwick Senators	87	77	X
7	Rockingham Flames	95	68	X
6	Perry Lakes Hawks	60	61	X

Grand Final
Warwick Senators	56	X	X
Rockingham Flames	85	X	X

==== Grand Final summary ====
30 August 2019
7:30 pm

Box score
Report
Highlights
Game replay

Warwick Senators 56, Rockingham Flames 85
Scoring by quarter: 9–19, 22–32, 17–18, 8–16
Pts: Stacey Barr 16; Rebs: Samaria Howard 9 Asts: Stacey Barr 3	Pts: Allen, Boag 17 each Rebs: Christina Boag 11; Asts: Garbin, Ciabattoni, Burrows 4 each
Rockingham wins SBL Championship

Bendat Basketball Centre, Floreat
MVP: Maddison Allen (Flames)

== All-Star games ==
The 2019 SBL All-Star games took place at Bendat Basketball Centre on Monday 3 June, with all proceeds going to Red Frogs Australia.

=== Men's game ===
==== Rosters ====
Australian All-Stars
Pos	Player	Team
Starters
F	Greg Hire	Rockingham Flames
G	Ryan Godfrey	Rockingham Flames
F	Gavin Field	Cockburn Cougars
G	David Humphries	Goldfields Giants
C	Louis Timms	Kalamunda Eastern Suns
Reserves
F	Cody Ellis	Warwick Senators
G	Kyle Armour	Lakeside Lightning
G	Damien Scott	Willetton Tigers
G	Ryan Smith	Perry Lakes Hawks
F	Caleb Davis	Warwick Senators
C	Jarrad Prue	Lakeside Lightning
G	Marshall Nelson	Perth Redbacks
Head coach: Mike Ellis (Warwick Senators) & Dayle Joseph (Geraldton Buccaneers)

World All-Stars
Pos	Player	Team
Starters
C	(United States) Kevin Davis	Joondalup Wolves
G	(Tonga) Marcus Alipate	Geraldton Buccaneers
G	(United States) Caleb White	Rockingham Flames
F	(United States) Patrick Burke	Goldfields Giants
G	(United States) Joshua Braun	Kalamunda Eastern Suns
Reserves
G	(United States) Justin King	Warwick Senators
G	(United States) Shaun Stewart	Mandurah Magic
F	(United States) Josh Ritchart	Rockingham Flames
F	(United States) Jobi Wall	Lakeside Lightning
F	(United States) Tyler Livingston	South West Slammers
G	(United States) Cameron Williams	East Perth Eagles
F	(United States) Jourdan DeMuynck	Perth Redbacks
Head coach: (Canada) Dave Daniels (Lakeside Lightning)

==== Game data ====
Highlights

3 June 2019
2:00 pm

Box Score
Recap
Recap

Australia 113, World 112
Scoring by quarter: 33–34, 36–27, 25–27, 19–24
Pts: Hire (20); Rebs: Prue (16); Asts: Hire (7)	Pts: Livingston (20); Rebs: Braun (8); Asts: DeMuynck (6)

Bendat Basketball Centre, Floreat
MVP: Greg Hire

=== Women's game ===
==== Rosters ====
Australian All-Stars
Pos	Player	Team
Starters
G	Jewel Williams	Kalamunda Eastern Suns
G	Desiree Kelley	Willetton Tigers
C	Maddison Allen	Rockingham Flames
F	Ashleigh Grant	Lakeside Lightning
F	Nes'eya Williams	Perth Redbacks
Reserves
G	Emma Gandini	Willetton Tigers
F	Sarah Donovan	Perry Lakes Hawks
F	Samantha Roscoe	Warwick Senators
C	Ellyce Ironmonger	Lakeside Lightning
G	Suzi-Rose Deegan	Perth Redbacks
G	Lauren Mansfield	Perth Redbacks
F	Christina Boag	Rockingham Flames
Head coach: Craig Mansfield (Lakeside Lightning)

World All-Stars
Pos	Player	Team
Starters
C	(United States) Jennie Rintala	Kalamunda Eastern Suns
F	(United States) Kisha Lee	Cockburn Cougars
G	(United States) Makailah Dyer	South West Slammers
G	(United States) GeAnna Luaulu-Summers	Lakeside Lightning
F	(United States) Laina Snyder	Willetton Tigers
Reserves
F	(United States) Amber Land	Joondalup Wolves
G	(New Zealand) Mikayla Pirini	Joondalup Wolves
G	(United States) Janelle Adams	Rockingham Flames
G	(United States) Jamie Cherry	Perry Lakes Hawks
C	(United States) Brittni Montgomery	South West Slammers
F	(United States) Bianca Villegas	Warwick Senators
G	(United States) Samaria Howard	Warwick Senators
Head coach: Charles Nix (Joondalup Wolves)

==== Game data ====
Highlights

3 June 2019
12:00 pm

Preview
Box Score
Recap
Recap

Australia 103, World 72
Scoring by quarter: 20–24, 31–13, 23–17, 29–18
Pts: Deegan (18); Rebs: Allen (9); Asts: J. Williams (7)	Pts: Lee (18); Rebs: Snyder (13); Asts: Snyder (5)

Bendat Basketball Centre, Floreat
MVP: Desiree Kelley

== Awards ==
=== Player of the Week ===
Round	Men's Player	Team	Women's Player	Team	Ref
1	Earnest Ross	Joondalup Wolves	Tayla Hepburn	Warwick Senators	
2	Shaun Stewart	Mandurah Magic	Kisha Lee	Cockburn Cougars	
3	Clint Steindl	Perry Lakes Hawks	Emma Gandini	Willetton Tigers	
4	Joshua Braun	Kalamunda Eastern Suns	Jamie Cherry	Perry Lakes Hawks	
5	Jobi Wall	Lakeside Lightning	Laina Snyder	Willetton Tigers	
6	N/A				
7	Shaun Stewart	Mandurah Magic	Laina Snyder	Willetton Tigers	
8	Liam Hunt	Geraldton Buccaneers	GeAnna Luaulu-Summers	Lakeside Lightning	
9	Patrick Burke	Goldfields Giants	Kayla Steindl	Joondalup Wolves	
10	Jack Isenbarger	Lakeside Lightning	Makailah Dyer	South West Slammers	
11	Jay Bowie	Goldfields Giants	Stacey Barr	Warwick Senators	
12	Ridell Camidge	Joondalup Wolves	Courtney Bayliss	South West Slammers	
13	Josh Ritchart	Rockingham Flames	Alina Hartmann	Cockburn Cougars	
14	Marshall Nelson	Perth Redbacks	Lauren Mansfield	Perth Redbacks	
15	Joshua Braun	Kalamunda Eastern Suns	Emma Klasztorny	Mandurah Magic	
16	Javion Blake	Kalamunda Eastern Suns	Stacey Barr	Warwick Senators	
17	Javion Blake	Kalamunda Eastern Suns	Katlyn Yohn	Kalamunda Eastern Suns	
18	Javion Blake	Kalamunda Eastern Suns	Maddison Allen	Rockingham Flames	
19	Jarrad Prue	Lakeside Lightning	Alex Ciabattoni	Rockingham Flames	
20	Marvin Smith II	Mandurah Magic	Jennie Rintala	Kalamunda Eastern Suns	

=== Statistics leaders ===
Category	Men's Player	Team	Stat	Women's Player	Team	Stat
Points per game	Marshall Nelson	Perth Redbacks	27.96	Darcee Garbin	Rockingham Flames	23.0
Rebounds per game	Jarrad Prue	Lakeside Lightning	18.29	Kayla Steindl	Joondalup Wolves	11.67
Assists per game	Javion Blake	Kalamunda Eastern Suns	9.68	Lauren Mansfield	Perth Redbacks	5.43
Steals per game	Michael Lay	South West Slammers	2.77	Emma Gandini	Willetton Tigers	3.0
Blocks per game	Manylok Malek	Goldfields Giants	2.3	Maddison Allen	Rockingham Flames	2.45
Field goal percentage	Jarrad Prue	Lakeside Lightning	62.16%	Brittni Montgomery	South West Slammers	63.01%
3-pt field goal percentage	Joshua Braun	Kalamunda Eastern Suns	42.9%	Stacey Barr	Warwick Senators	40.4%
Free throw percentage	Joshua Braun	Kalamunda Eastern Suns	84.21%	Makailah Dyer	South West Slammers	79.01%

=== Regular season ===
The 2019 Basketball WA Annual Awards Night was held on Saturday 7 September at Crown Perth.

- Men's Most Valuable Player: Joshua Braun (Kalamunda Eastern Suns)
- Women's Most Valuable Player: Stacey Barr (Warwick Senators)
- Men's Coach of the Year: Dave Daniels (Lakeside Lightning)
- Women's Coach of the Year: Craig Watts (Mandurah Magic)
- Men's Most Improved Player: Luke Travers (Rockingham Flames)
- Women's Most Improved Player: Matilda Muir (Cockburn Cougars)
- All-MSBL First Team:
  - PG: Marshall Nelson (Perth Redbacks)
  - SG: Joshua Braun (Kalamunda Eastern Suns)
  - SF: Gavin Field (Cockburn Cougars)
  - PF: Greg Hire (Rockingham Flames)
  - C: Patrick Burke (Goldfields Giants)
- All-WSBL First Team:
  - PG: Lauren Mansfield (Perth Redbacks)
  - SG: Stacey Barr (Warwick Senators)
  - SF: Laina Snyder (Willetton Tigers)
  - PF: Darcee Garbin (Rockingham Flames)
  - C: Amber Land (Joondalup Wolves)
- Men's All-Defensive Team:
  - PG: Cameron Williams (East Perth Eagles)
  - SG: David Humphries (Goldfields Giants)
  - SF: Ben Purser (Perry Lakes Hawks)
  - PF: Maurice Barrow (Willetton Tigers)
  - C: Jarrad Prue (Lakeside Lightning)
- Women's All-Defensive Team:
  - PG: Emma Gandini (Willetton Tigers)
  - SG: Casey Mihovilovich (Mandurah Magic)
  - SF: Desiree Kelley (Willetton Tigers)
  - PF: Jennie Rintala (Kalamunda Eastern Suns)
  - C: Maddison Allen (Rockingham Flames)

=== Finals ===
- Men's Grand Final MVP: Liam Hunt (Geraldton Buccaneers)
- Women's Grand Final MVP: Maddison Allen (Rockingham Flames)
