= 2022 NBL1 West season =

- League: NBL1 West
- Sport: Basketball
- Duration: 8 April – 13 August (Regular season); 19 August – 3 September (Finals)
- Games: 22 (men); 20 (women)
- Teams: 14 (men); 13 (women)

Regular season
- Minor premiers: M: Geraldton Buccaneers; W: Warwick Senators
- Season MVP: M: Devondrick Walker (Rockingham Flames); W: Stacey Barr (Warwick Senators)
- Top scorer: M: Devondrick Walker (Rockingham Flames); W: Stacey Barr (Warwick Senators)

Finals
- Champions: M: Rockingham Flames; W: Warwick Senators
- Runners-up: M: Geraldton Buccaneers; W: Willetton Tigers
- Grand Final MVP: M: Devondrick Walker (Rockingham Flames); W: Leonie Fiebich (Warwick Senators)

NBL1 West seasons
- ← 2021 2023 →

The 2022 NBL1 West season was the second season of the NBL1 West and 33rd overall in State Basketball League (SBL) / NBL1 West history. The regular season began on Friday 8 April and ended on Saturday 13 August. The finals began on Friday 19 August and concluded with the women's grand final on Friday 2 September and the men's grand final on Saturday 3 September.

The 2022 NBL1 season saw the inaugural NBL1 National Finals take place in Melbourne, where both West champions the Rockingham Flames men and Warwick Senators women were crowned as NBL1 National champions.

== Regular season ==
The regular season began on Friday 8 April and ended on Saturday 13 August after 19 rounds of competition. Easter games in round 2 were again scheduled for a blockbuster Thursday night, with all teams then on a break over the long weekend. Games then tipped-off again the following Friday for Anzac Round. There was also Pink Round (5), Mental Health Round (11) and First Nations Round (14). In July, a regular season fixture was played in Esperance.

For the first time in club history, the Goldfields Giants fielded a women's team in 2022.

=== Standings ===
Men's ladder

Pos	Team	Pld	W	L	Pts	Qualification
1	Geraldton Buccaneers	22	19	3	38	Finals
2	Rockingham Flames	22	18	4	36	Finals
3	Joondalup Wolves	22	16	6	32	Finals
4	Cockburn Cougars	22	15	7	30	Finals
5	Warwick Senators	22	14	8	28	Finals
6	Goldfields Giants	22	14	8	28	Finals
7	Mandurah Magic	22	13	9	26	Finals
8	Perry Lakes Hawks	22	12	10	24	Finals
9	Perth Redbacks	22	11	11	22	
10	Willetton Tigers	22	7	15	14	
11	Lakeside Lightning	22	4	18	8	
12	East Perth Eagles	22	4	18	8	
13	Kalamunda Eastern Suns	22	4	18	8	
14	South West Slammers	22	3	19	6	

Source: NBL1

Women's ladder

Pos	Team	Pld	W	L	Pts	Qualification
1	Warwick Senators	20	18	2	36	Finals
2	Joondalup Wolves	20	18	2	36	Finals
3	Mandurah Magic	20	16	4	32	Finals
4	Willetton Tigers	20	15	5	30	Finals
5	Cockburn Cougars	20	13	7	26	Finals
6	Lakeside Lightning	20	11	9	22	Finals
7	Rockingham Flames	20	10	10	20	Finals
8	Perry Lakes Hawks	20	9	11	18	Finals
9	Goldfields Giants	20	8	12	16	
10	East Perth Eagles	20	5	15	10	
11	Perth Redbacks	20	4	16	8	
12	Kalamunda Eastern Suns	20	2	18	4	
13	South West Slammers	20	1	19	2	

Source: NBL1

== Finals ==
The finals began on Friday 19 August and consisted of four rounds. The finals concluded with the women's grand final on Friday 2 September and the men's grand final on Saturday 3 September.

=== Men's bracket ===
Qualifying and elimination finals
Aug 20, Activewest Stadium
1	Geraldton Buccaneers	101
4	Cockburn Cougars	70
Aug 20, Warwick Stadium
5	Warwick Senators	93
8	Perry Lakes Hawks	61
Aug 20, Niels Hansen Stadium
6	Goldfields Giants	78
7	Mandurah Magic	76
Aug 20, Mike Barnett Sports Complex
2	Rockingham Flames	86
3	Joondalup Wolves	77

Semi-finals
Aug 25, Wally Hagan Stadium
Cockburn Cougars	77
Warwick Senators	79
Aug 26, HBF Arena
Joondalup Wolves	85
Goldfields Giants	83

Preliminary finals
Aug 28, Activewest Stadium
Geraldton Buccaneers	107
Joondalup Wolves	81
Aug 27, Mike Barnett Sports Complex
Rockingham Flames	85
Warwick Senators	74

Grand final
Sep 3, Bendat Basketball Centre
Geraldton Buccaneers	79
Rockingham Flames	91

==== Grand Final summary ====
Kayo Sports

3 September 2022
7:00 pm

Box score
Report
Highlights

Geraldton Buccaneers 79, Rockingham Flames 91
Scoring by quarter: 26–21, 23–18, 21–27, 9–25
Pts: Meunier, Muo 15 each Rebs: Liam Hunt 10; Asts: Stewart, Coleman 4 each	Pts: Devondrick Walker 26; Rebs: Justin Beard 11; Asts: Tom Jervis 6
Rockingham wins NBL1 West Championship

Bendat Basketball Centre, Floreat
MVP: Devondrick Walker (Flames)

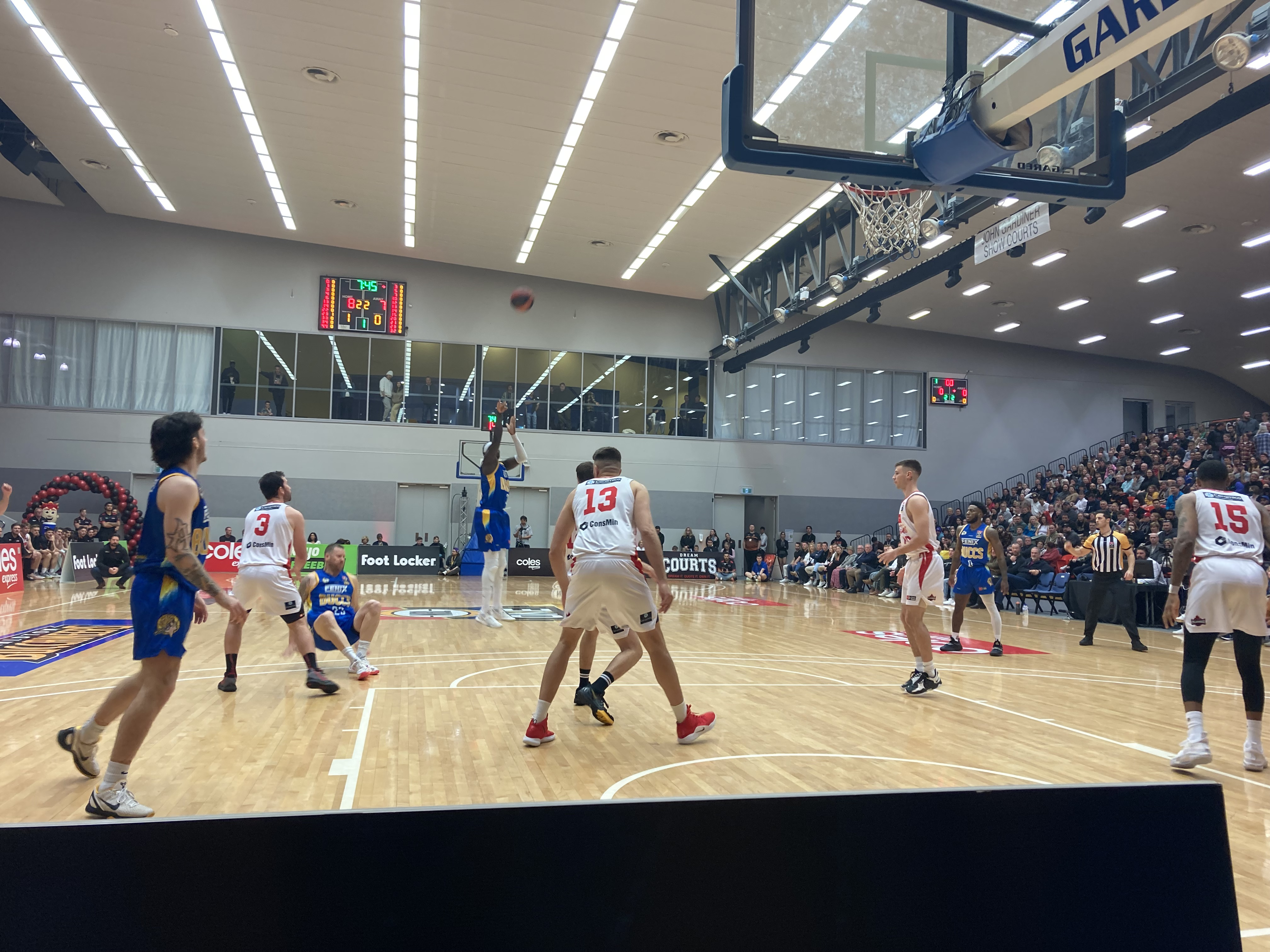
NBL1 West Men's Grand Final

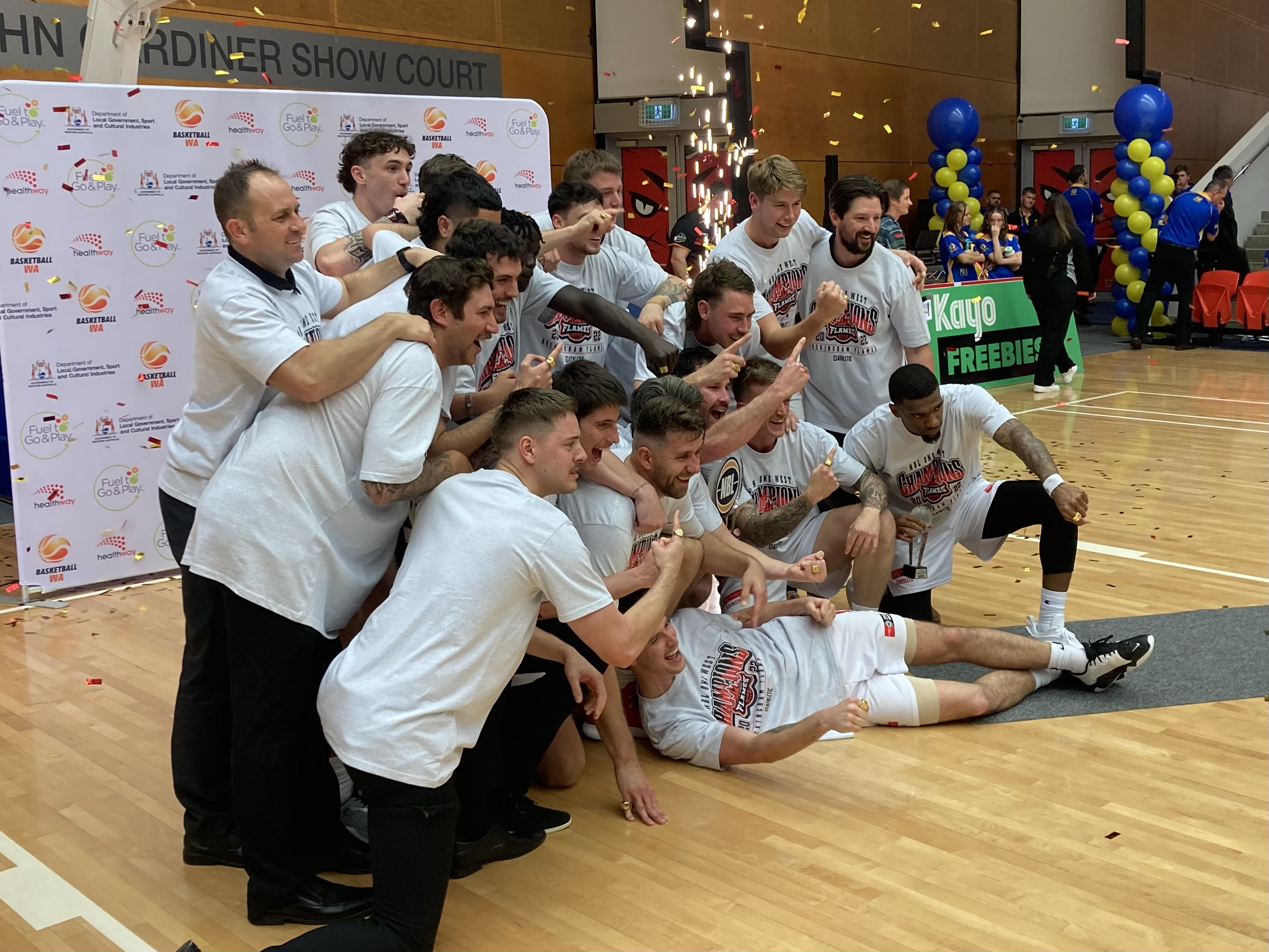
Rockingham Flames 2022 Men's NBL1 West champions

=== Women's bracket ===
Qualifying and elimination finals
Aug 20, Warwick Stadium
1	Warwick Senators	96
4	Willetton Tigers	84
Aug 20, Wally Hagan Stadium
5	Cockburn Cougars	75
8	Perry Lakes Hawks	65
Aug 20, Lakeside Recreation Centre
6	Lakeside Lightning	73
7	Rockingham Flames	76
Aug 19, HBF Arena
2	Joondalup Wolves	81
3	Mandurah Magic	70

Semi-finals
Aug 25, Willetton Basketball Stadium
Willetton Tigers	103
Cockburn Cougars	98
Aug 25, Mandurah ARC
Mandurah Magic	77
Rockingham Flames	72

Preliminary finals
Aug 27, Warwick Stadium
Warwick Senators	79
Mandurah Magic	66
Aug 27, HBF Arena
Joondalup Wolves	81
Willetton Tigers	92

Grand final
Sep 2, Bendat Basketball Centre
Warwick Senators	87
Willetton Tigers	61

==== Grand Final summary ====
Kayo Sports

2 September 2022
7:30 pm

Box score
Report
Highlights

Warwick Senators 87, Willetton Tigers 61
Scoring by quarter: 28–16, 18–14, 23–19, 18–12
Pts: Stacey Barr 23; Rebs: Mackenzie Clinch Hoycard 13; Asts: Stacey Barr 9	Pts: Tayla Hepburn 16; Rebs: Samantha Lubcke 8 Asts: Sharp, Doran 4 each
Warwick wins NBL1 West Championship

Bendat Basketball Centre, Floreat
MVP: Leonie Fiebich (Senators)

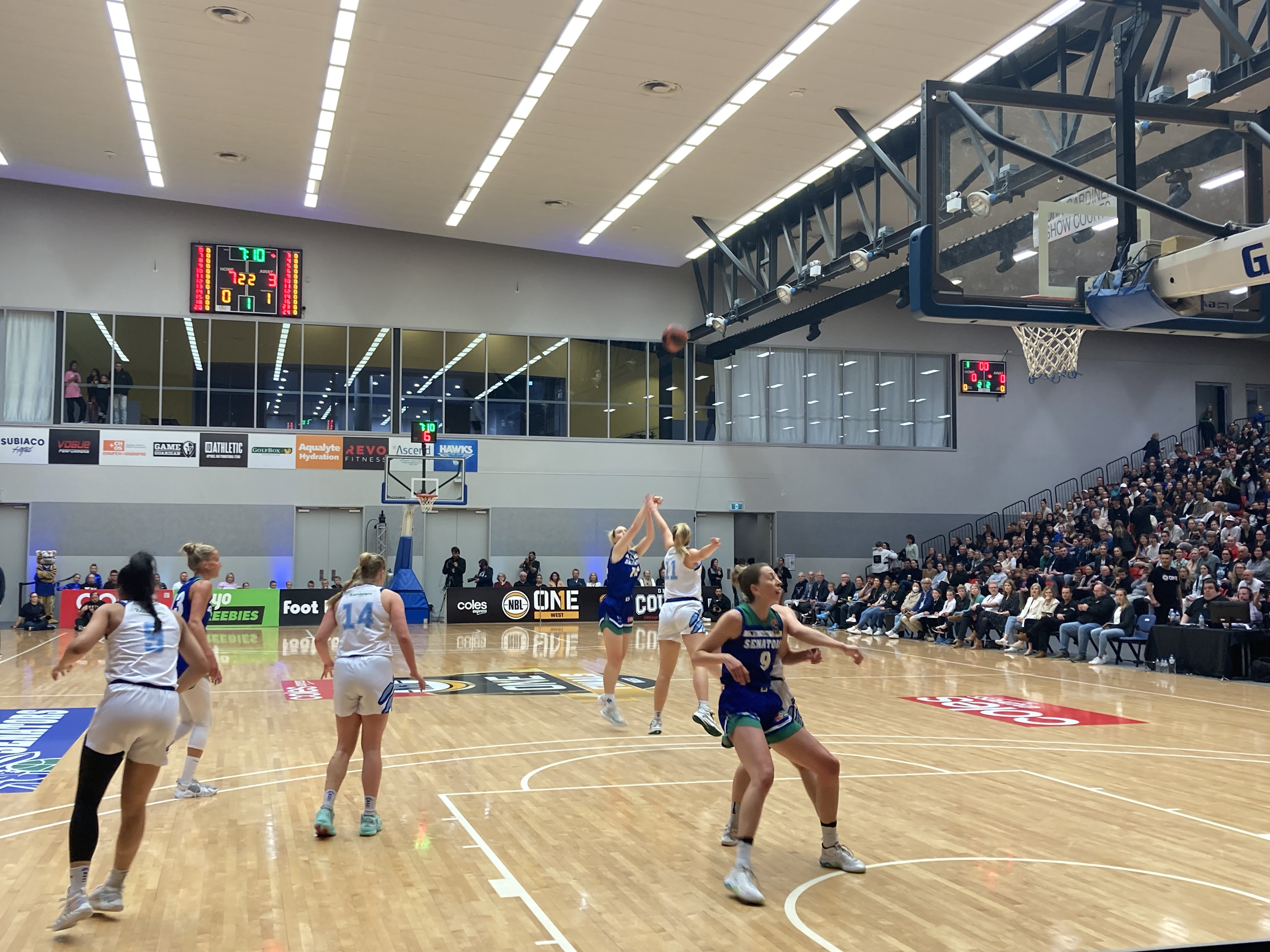
NBL1 West Women's Grand Final

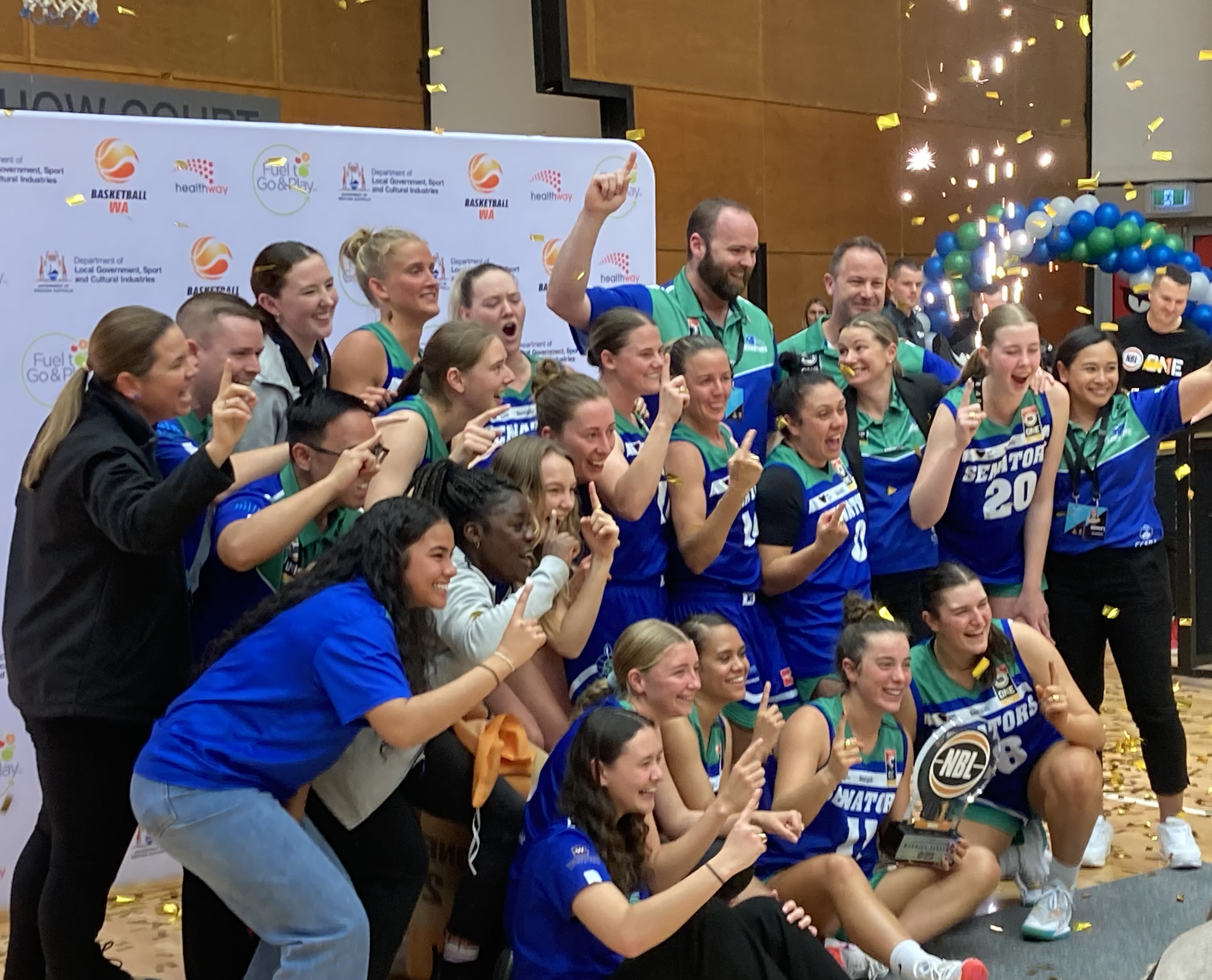
Warwick Senators 2022 Women's NBL1 West champions

== Awards ==
=== Player of the Week ===
Round	Men's Player	Team	Women's Player	Team	Ref
1	Cameron Coleman	Geraldton Buccaneers	Jessie Edwards	Cockburn Cougars	
2	Justin King	East Perth Eagles	Teige Morrell	Joondalup Wolves	
3	Gavin Field	Cockburn Cougars	Caitlyn Jones	Lakeside Lightning	
4	Shaun Stewart	Geraldton Buccaneers	Nes'eya Parker-Williams	Joondalup Wolves	
5	Devondrick Walker	Rockingham Flames	Maria Blazejewski	East Perth Eagles	
6	Jerami Grace	Perth Redbacks	Stacey Barr	Warwick Senators	
7	Mathiang Muo	Geraldton Buccaneers	Patricia Brossmann	Rockingham Flames	
8	Marshall Nelson	Rockingham Flames	Jessie Edwards	Cockburn Cougars	
9	Bye round				
10	Carter Skaggs	Cockburn Cougars	Teige Morrell	Joondalup Wolves	
11	Julian Pesava	Joondalup Wolves	Stacey Barr	Warwick Senators	
12	Gavin Field	Cockburn Cougars	Robbi Ryan	Joondalup Wolves	
13	Marshall Nelson	Rockingham Flames	Mehryn Kraker	Rockingham Flames	
14	Justin King	East Perth Eagles	Leonie Fiebich	Warwick Senators	
15	Devondrick Walker	Rockingham Flames	Emma Clarke	Perry Lakes Hawks	
16	C. J. Turnage	Joondalup Wolves	Alexandra Sharp	Willetton Tigers	
17	Josh Hunt	Cockburn Cougars	Stacey Barr	Warwick Senators	
18	Buay Tuach	South West Slammers	Kat Tudor	Cockburn Cougars	
19	Jerami Grace	Perth Redbacks	Teige Morrell	Joondalup Wolves	

=== Coach of the Month ===
Month	Men's Coach	Team	Women's Coach	Team	Ref
April	Dayle Joseph	Geraldton Buccaneers	Marcus Wong	Joondalup Wolves	
May/June	Dayle Joseph	Geraldton Buccaneers	Marcus Wong	Joondalup Wolves	
June/July	N/A		N/A		
July/August	N/A		N/A		

=== Statistics leaders ===
Stats as of the end of the regular season

Category	Men's Player	Team	Stat	Women's Player	Team	Stat
Points per game	Devondrick Walker	Rockingham Flames	27.05	Stacey Barr	Warwick Senators	25.05
Rebounds per game	Joshua Davey	Lakeside Lightning	11.95	Ruth Davis	Lakeside Lightning	13.38
Assists per game	Seva Chan	Cockburn Cougars	7.00	Jewel Williams	Cockburn Cougars	6.26
Steals per game	Dequan Abrom	Mandurah Magic	2.73	Emma Gandini	Willetton Tigers	3.53
Blocks per game	Paschal Chukwu	Cockburn Cougars	2.50	Ruth Davis	Lakeside Lightning	2.85
Field goal percentage	Paschal Chukwu	Cockburn Cougars	67.37%	Teige Morrell	Joondalup Wolves	61.17%
3-pt field goal percentage	Devondrick Walker	Rockingham Flames	46.02%	Chloe Forster	Warwick Senators	44.73%
Free throw percentage	Justin King	East Perth Eagles	90.81%	Alexandra Sharp	Willetton Tigers	87.87%

=== Regular season ===
The 2022 Basketball WA Annual Awards Night was held on Saturday 13 August at Crown Perth.

- Men's Most Valuable Player: Devondrick Walker (Rockingham Flames)
- Women's Most Valuable Player: Stacey Barr (Warwick Senators)
- Men's Coach of the Year: Dayle Joseph (Geraldton Buccaneers)
- Women's Coach of the Year: Marcus Wong (Joondalup Wolves)
- Men's Defensive Player of the Year: Cameron Coleman (Geraldton Buccaneers)
- Women's Defensive Player of the Year: Emma Gandini (Willetton Tigers)
- Men's Youth Player of the Year: Caleb Van De Griend (South West Slammers)
- Women's Youth Player of the Year: Nes'eya Parker-Williams (Joondalup Wolves)
- Sixth Man of the Year: Johny Narkle (Geraldton Buccaneers)
- Sixth Woman of the Year: Hannah Little (Mandurah Magic)
- Men's Leading Scorer: Devondrick Walker (Rockingham Flames)
- Women's Leading Scorer: Stacey Barr (Warwick Senators)
- Men's Leading Rebounder: Joshua Davey (Lakeside Lightning)
- Women's Leading Rebounder: Ruth Davis (Lakeside Lightning)
- Men's Golden Hands: (Note: Golden Hands Award winner is determined by the following equation: (Total Assists + Total Steals – Total Turnovers) / Games Played = Golden Hands Award Rating.) Seva Chan (Cockburn Cougars)
- Women's Golden Hands: Robbi Ryan (Joondalup Wolves)
- All-NBL1 West Men's 1st Team:
  - Cameron Coleman (Geraldton Buccaneers)
  - Caleb Davis (Warwick Senators)
  - Marshall Nelson (Rockingham Flames)
  - C. J. Turnage (Joondalup Wolves)
  - Devondrick Walker (Rockingham Flames)
- All-NBL1 West Women's 1st Team:
  - Stacey Barr (Warwick Senators)
  - Emma Clarke (Perry Lakes Hawks)
  - Jessie Edwards (Cockburn Cougars)
  - Teige Morrell (Joondalup Wolves)
  - Robbi Ryan (Joondalup Wolves)

=== Finals ===
- Men's Grand Final MVP: Devondrick Walker (Rockingham Flames)
- Women's Grand Final MVP: Leonie Fiebich (Warwick Senators)

== See also ==
- 2022 NBL1 season
