= Corban Wroe =

Australian basketball player (born 1992)

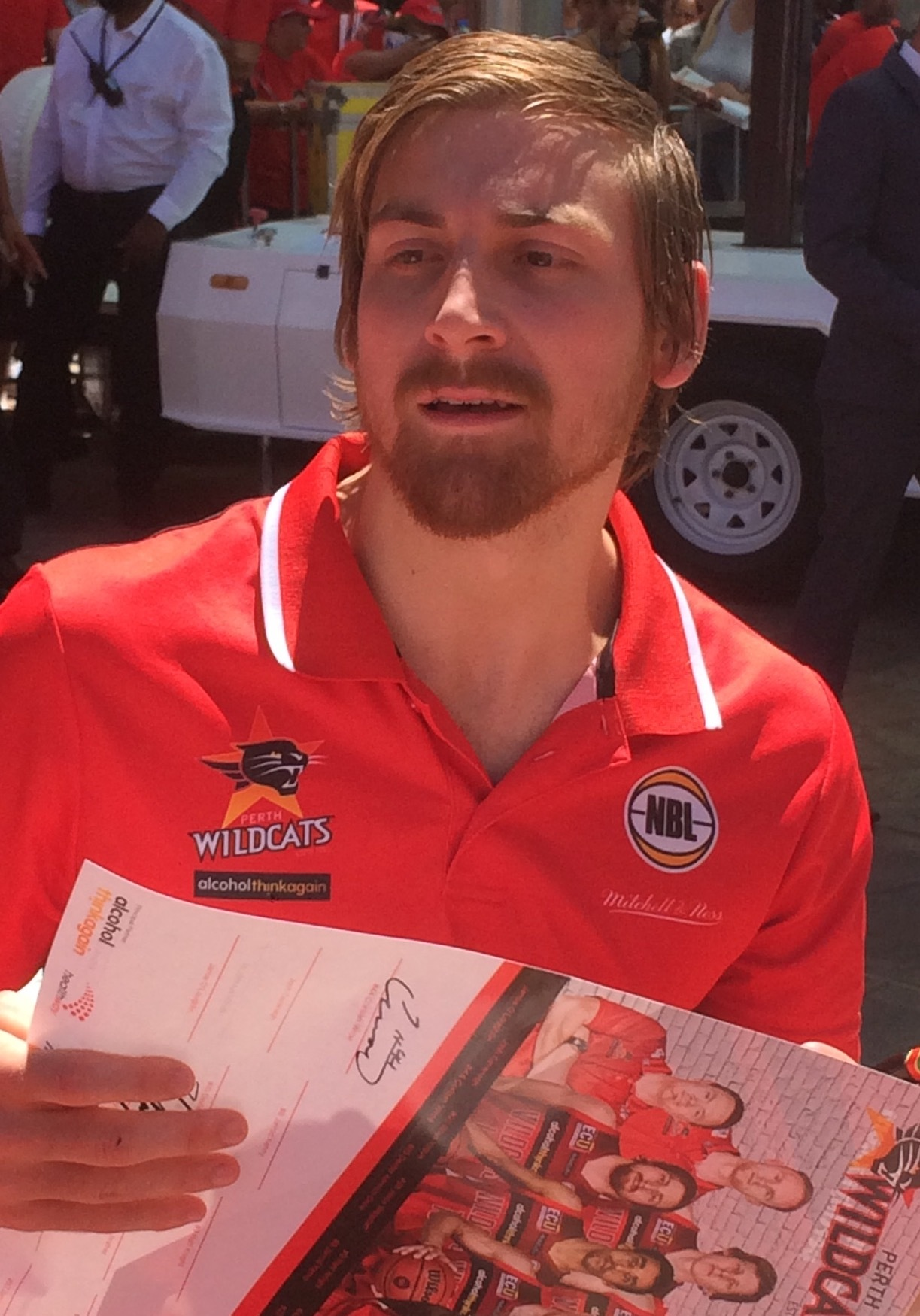
- Wroe in March 2017

Personal information
- Born: 30 September 1992 (age 34) Townsville, Queensland, Australia
- Listed height: 185 cm (6 ft 1 in)
- Listed weight: 86 kg (190 lb)

Career information
- High school: Southern Cross Catholic College (Brisbane, Queensland); Lake Ginninderra Secondary College (Canberra, ACT)
- College: Hartford (2011–2015)
- NBA draft: 2015: undrafted
- Playing career: 2009–2022
- Position: Point guard

Career history
- 2009–2010: Australian Institute of Sport
- 2015: Townsville Heat
- 2015–2017: Perth Wildcats
- 2016–2018; 2020–2022: Stirling/Warwick Senators

Career highlights
- 2× NBL champion (2016, 2017); WCC champion (2020); WCC Grand Final MVP (2020); 2× AEC All-Defensive Team (2014, 2015)

Corban Joel Wroe (born 30 September 1992) is an Australian former professional basketball player. He played four seasons of college basketball in the United States for the Hartford Hawks before spending two seasons as a development player with the Perth Wildcats of the National Basketball League (NBL). He played six seasons for the Warwick Senators of the NBL1 West between 2016 and 2022.

== Early life and career ==
Wroe was born in Townsville, Queensland. He attended Southern Cross Catholic College in Brisbane between 2005 and 2009.

In 2009, Wroe moved to Canberra to attend the Australian Institute of Sport (AIS). That year, he attended Lake Ginninderra Secondary College and represented the school at the Australian Schools Championships. During the year, he played eight games for the AIS men's team in the South East Australian Basketball League (SEABL), averaging 4.4 points and 1.8 rebounds per game.

In 2010, Wroe played 12 games for the AIS in the SEABL, averaging 2.7 points, 1.3 rebounds and 2.1 assists per game.

Wroe continued with the AIS in 2011.

Wroe represented Queensland state teams at Australian under-age national championships between 2007 and 2010. He participated in the 2009 Nike All-Asia Camp and the 2010 Nike Global Challenge. He was named the 2010 Junior Male Player of the Year by Basketball Queensland.

== College career ==
=== Freshman year ===
In April 2011, Wroe signed a national letter of intent to played college basketball for the University of Hartford.

Wroe came into Hartford as just the second Hawk in program history to hail from Australia. Entering his freshman year, he was described by coach John Gallagher as a tough defender who could be relied upon to disrupt the opponent's offensive flow. His maturity and awareness on the offensive end made him a natural leader on the court at the guard position. He played in 31 games for the Hawks in 2011–12, making three starts and averaging 1.6 points and 1.4 rebounds in 9.9 minutes per game. In just his third college game, he scored a season-high 10 points against Mount St. Mary's. He was named to the America East Commissioner's Honor Roll for achieving a grade point average of 3.5 or greater.

=== Sophomore year ===
Wroe's maturity and leadership shown during his freshman year earned him co-captain honours for the 2012–13 season. He was one of three players to start and play in all 31 games in 2012–13, as he averaged 2.8 points and 2.1 rebounds in 19.2 minutes per game. He scored a season-high 8 points on 16 February 2013 against Albany. For the second year in a row, he was named to the America East Commissioner's Honor Roll for achieving a grade point average of 3.5 or greater.

=== Junior year ===
As a junior in 2013–14, Wroe earned America East All-Defensive Team honours and was named to the All-Academic Team. He was also one of 10 NCAA men's basketball players to receive a Division I-AAA Athletics Directors Association Scholar-Athlete award. As team co-captain for a second season, Wroe was one of two players to start and play in all 33 games. He averaged career-best numbers in scoring (6.3 ppg), rebounding (3.2 rpg) and minutes (25.3 mpg), while his 57 total assists were a career-high and ranked third on the team. He scored a career-high 21 points on two occasions, recording the mark in two of the final three games of the season. His 21 points against Stony Brook in the season finale all came from three-pointers, hitting 7-of-9 on the night. His academic prowess was recognised again, earning America East Commissioner's Honor Roll honours for a third time for achieving a grade point average of 3.5 or higher.

=== Senior year ===
As a senior in 2014–15, Wroe earned America East All-Defensive Team and All-Academic Team honours for a second straight year. He became the first player in program history to earn two America East All-Defensive Team nominations. He significantly stepped up his three-point game during his senior season. Combining to make just 33 threes over his first three seasons, he converted from long range 49 times in his final season to finish eighth among America East leaders in threes per game. Wroe put up solid numbers on both ends of the court in 2014–15, as he ranked second in scoring with 9.9 points per game while adding 4.1 rebounds per game, 2.4 assists per game and a team-leading 41 steals. On 19 January 2015, Wroe scored a career-high 23 points in a 65–63 win over UMBC.

Wroe graduated from Hartford with a long list of academic accomplishments and a degree in health sciences. Earning America East Commissioner's Honor Roll laurels all four years for achieving a grade point average of 3.5 or higher, he became the second player in program history to earn repeat America East All-Academic Team honors. In addition, Wroe capped off his career by becoming Hartford's first-ever repeat Division I AAA Scholar-Athlete Team member, as he received the accolade in both 2014 and 2015. In preparation for leaving college, Wroe signed with Mummu Athlete Management.

=== College statistics ===
Year	Team	GP	GS	MPG	FG%	3P%	FT%	RPG	APG	SPG	BPG	PPG
2011–12	Hartford	31	3	9.9	.472	.200	.625	1.4	.5	.4	.0	1.6
2012–13	Hartford	31	31	19.2	.542	.250	.792	2.1	1.1	.9	.1	2.8
2013–14	Hartford	33	33	25.3	.486	.433	.800	3.2	1.7	.6	.1	6.3
2014–15	Hartford	30	29	34.5	.462	.358	.750	4.1	2.4	1.4	.1	9.9
Career		125	96	22.2	.480	.371	.752	2.7	1.4	.8	.1	5.1

== Professional career ==
=== Townsville Heat and Melbourne United (2015) ===
In May 2015, Wroe joined the Townsville Heat of the Queensland Basketball League (QBL). In eight games during the 2015 season, he averaged 12.5 points, 6.4 rebounds and 3.3 assists per game.

In July 2015, Wroe had a two-week training stint with NBL club Melbourne United before touring with them in China for a week.

=== Perth Wildcats (2015–2017) ===
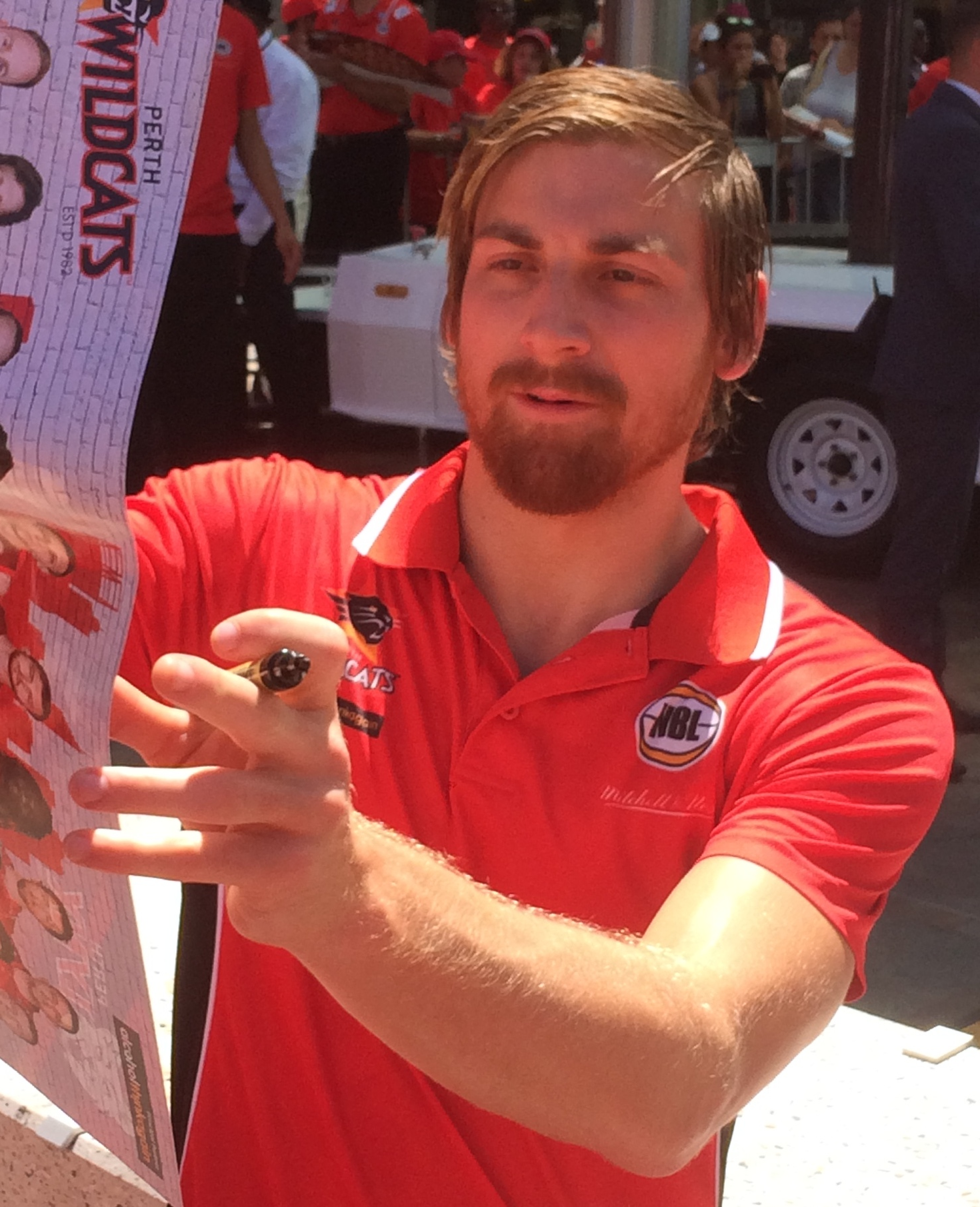
Wroe with the Wildcats in March 2017

On 4 September 2015, Wroe signed with the Perth Wildcats as a development player for the 2015–16 NBL season. He was compared to fellow former Perth Wildcats guard Brad Robbins. He made his NBL debut on 10 October, recording two assists and one rebound in two and a half minutes in a 79–66 win over the Adelaide 36ers. He saw an increase in minutes later that month and into November due to an injury to Damian Martin. He saw extended minutes late in the season as well due to injuries. The Wildcats finished the regular season in second place with an 18–10 record. They defeated the Illawarra Hawks 2–1 in the semi-finals and then took out the championship with a 2–1 victory over the New Zealand Breakers in the grand final series. He appeared in 19 of the team's 34 games in 2015–16, recording totals of 17 points and 15 assists.

Returning to the Wildcats as a development player for the 2016–17 NBL season, Wroe was once again thrust into the line-up early in the season due to injuries to Damian Martin and Jarrod Kenny. He made his season debut for the Wildcats on 28 October against the Illawarra Hawks in Wollongong. In 29 minutes as a starter, he recorded two points, two rebounds and one assist in an 81–76 loss. Martin returned to action for the Wildcats in the following game against the Adelaide 36ers in Perth on 5 November, but sustained another injury mid-game, which led to Wroe playing extended minutes off the bench. In 22 minutes, he recorded five points, five rebounds, four assists and one steal in a 106–103 win. He started for the Wildcats in their next game against the New Zealand Breakers on 13 November, but was struck to the head during the 87–86 overtime loss and was unable to train the following week because of concussion. As a result, he was ruled out of the Wildcats' 17 November game against the Sydney Kings. With Kenny returning to the side, Wroe's minutes decreased significantly averaging 7.14 minutes upon his return between rounds 8 and 14. The Wildcats finished the regular season in third place with a 15–13 record. They defeated the Cairns Taipans 2–0 in the semi-finals and then took out the championship with a 3–0 victory over the Illawarra Hawks in the grand final series. He appeared in 16 of the team's 33 games in 2016–17, averaging 1.3 points, 1.1 rebounds and 0.8 assists in 9.8 minutes per game.

=== Stirling/Warwick Senators (2016–2022) ===
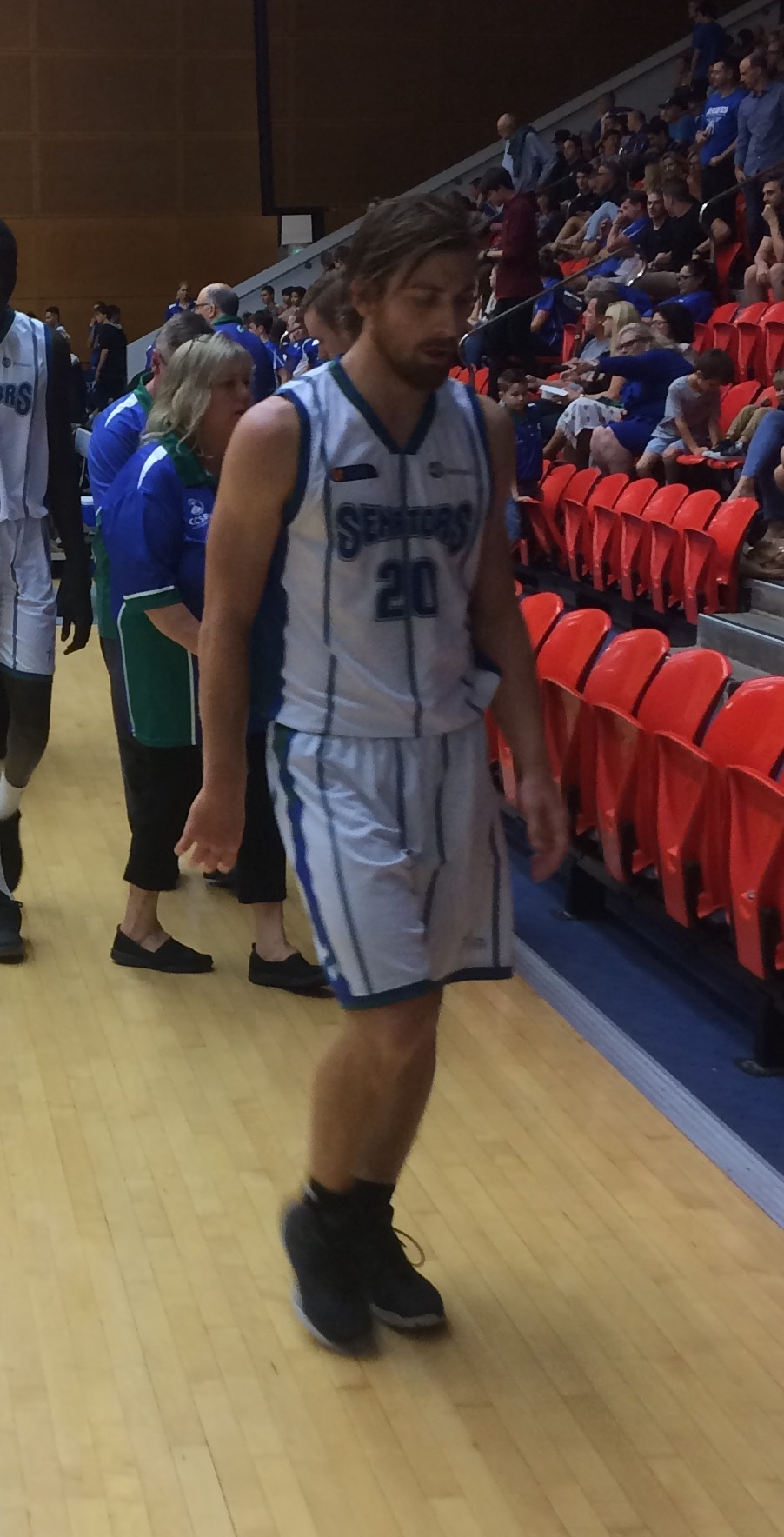
Wroe with the Senators in March 2017

On 15 January 2016, Wroe signed with the Stirling Senators of the State Basketball League (SBL) for the 2016 season. He scored a season-high 25 points on 18 June against the Goldfields Giants. The Senators finished the regular season in sixth place with a 17–9 record, and faced the Willetton Tigers in the quarter-finals, where they were defeated 2–0. In 22 games, Wroe averaged 9.8 points, 3.6 rebounds, 4.9 assists and 1.3 steals per game.

Wroe re-joined to the Senators for the 2017 season. He scored 20 points in the season opener on 17 March against the Perry Lakes Hawks. On 15 July, he scored a season-high 23 points in a 105–95 win over the South West Slammers. The Senators finished the regular season in sixth place with a 15–11 record, and faced the Geraldton Buccaneers in the quarter-finals, where they were defeated 2–1. In 26 games for the Senators in 2017, Wroe averaged 11.2 points, 4.5 rebounds and 4.5 assists per game.

Wroe re-joined the Senators as team captain for the 2018 season. On 25 March, he had 13 assists in a 120–111 win over the Willetton Tigers. Wroe missed time mid-season with an ankle injury. The Senators finished the regular season in sixth place for the third straight year with a 14–12 record. In the first game of the quarter-finals against the Perth Redbacks, Wroe had a season-high 16 points with 10 assists in a 114–109 loss. They went on to defeat the Redbacks in three games before being swept by the Joondalup Wolves in the semi-finals. In 26 games for the Senators in 2018, Wroe averaged 7.3 points, 4.0 rebounds, 6.5 assists and 1.4 steals per game.

The club was renamed Warwick Senators in 2019 but Wroe sat out the season. He returned to the Senators in 2020 but the COVID-19 pandemic forced the cancellation of the SBL season. Wroe later played for the Senators in the West Coast Classic and helped them reach the grand final, where they defeated the Perry Lakes Hawks 96–81 behind his MVP performance of 15 points, six rebounds and six assists.

In December 2020, Wroe re-signed with the Senators for the 2021 NBL1 West season. He sustained an injury in round 9 and did not play again during the season. In eight games, he averaged 7.75 points, 4.5 rebounds, 5.12 assists and 1.75 steals per game.

In December 2021, Wroe re-signed with the Senators for the 2022 NBL1 West season. He only played half the season, averaging 8.4 points, 3.5 rebounds, 5.7 assists and 1.3 steals in 10 games.

== National team career ==
In 2008, Wroe helped the under 19 Australian Emus win the FIBA Oceania Youth Tournament. In 2009, he helped Australia win gold at the Australian Youth Olympic Festival.

In 2010, Wroe helped the Emus win the Albert Schweitzer Tournament. He later helped the Emus go 7–2 on their China tour. He attended a team camp in August in preparation for the FIBA Oceania U18 Championship, but he did not make the final squad.

Wroe was part of the Emus' training camp squad preparing for the 2011 FIBA Under-19 World Championship.
