= 2015 NBA Development League draft =

General information
- Sport: Basketball
- Date: October 31, 2015

Overview
- League: NBA
- First selection: Jeff Ayres, Idaho Stampede

The 2015 NBA Development League draft was the 15th draft of the National Basketball Association Development League (NBDL). The draft was held on October 31, 2015, just before the 2015–16 season.

== Key ==
Pos.	G	F	C
Position	Guard	Forward	Center

^	Denotes player who has been selected to (an) NBA Development League All-Star Game(s)
*	Denotes player who has been selected to (an) NBA Development League All-Star Game(s) and was also selected in an NBA draft
†	Denotes player who was also selected in an NBA Draft

== Draft ==
=== First round ===
Pick	Player	Pos.	Nationality	Team	College/Country
1	Jeff Ayres^{†}	F/C	United States	Idaho Stampede	Arizona State
2	Jimmer Fredette^{†}	G	United States	Westchester Knicks	BYU
3	Perry Jones^{†}	F	United States	Iowa Energy	Baylor
4	Cartier Martin	G/F	United States	Iowa Energy	Kansas State
5	Rysheed Jordan	G	United States	Delaware 87ers	St. John's
6	Amir Williams	C	United States	Rio Grande Valley Vipers	Ohio State
7	Sam Thompson	F	United States	Grand Rapids Drive	Ohio State
8	David Laury	F	United States	Delaware 87ers	Iona
9	Rick Jackson	F/C	United States	Iowa Energy	Syracuse
10	Jarvis Summers	G	United States	Reno Bighorns	Ole Miss
11	Askia Booker	G	United States	Maine Red Claws	Colorado
12	Cliff Hammonds	G	United States	Rio Grande Valley Vipers	Clemson
13	Rodney Carney^{†}	G/F	United States	Oklahoma City Blue	Memphis
14	Jabril Trawick	G	United States	Sioux Falls Skyforce	Georgetown
15	Antonio Barton	G	United States	Canton Charge	Memphis
16	Jean Victor Nguidjol	C	Cameroon	Austin Spurs	Lyceum Pirates
17	Kevin Young	F	Puerto Rico	Bakersfield Jam	Kansas
18	Jarred Shaw	F/C	United States	Santa Cruz Warriors	Utah State
19	Mike Anderson	G	United States	Raptors 905	Washington

=== Second round ===
Pick	Player	Pos.	Nationality	Team	College/Country
1	Karrington Ward	F	United States	Bakersfield Jam	Eastern Michigan
2	Jay Harris	G	United States	Raptors 905	Illinois-Chicago
3	Rashawn Rembert	G	United States	Iowa Energy	East Tennessee
4	J'Mison Morgan	F/C	United States	Westchester Knicks	Baylor
5	Myck Kabongo	G	Canada	Delaware 87ers	Texas
6	Bobby Ray Parks Jr.	G	Philippines	Texas Legends	NUPH
7	Michael Stockton	G	United States	Grand Rapids Drive	Westminster (UT)
8	Troy Huff	G	United States	Erie BayHawks	North Dakota
9	Patrick Miller	G	United States	Oklahoma City Blue	Tennessee
10	Chad Toppert	F	United States	Reno Bighorns	New Mexico
11	Ronnie Brewer^{†}	G/F	United States	Santa Cruz Warriors	Arkansas
12	Ella Ellis	F	United States	Maine Red Claws	Army
13	Stephan Hicks	G/F	United States	Oklahoma City Blue	Cal State Northridge
14	Deonta Stocks	G	United States	Sioux Falls Skyforce	West Georgia
15	Adrian Forbes	F	United States	Canton Charge	Auburn
16	Demetri McCamey	G	United States	Austin Toros	Illinois
17	Justin Hawkins	F	United States	Los Angeles D-Fenders	NM State
18	Justin Manns	G	United States	Santa Cruz Warriors	Kent State
19	Walter Lemon, Jr.	G	United States	Fort Wayne Mad Ants	Bradley

=== Third round ===
Pick	Player	Pos.	Nationality	Team	College/Country
1	Chris Denson	G	United States	Delaware 87ers	Auburn
2	Brett Olson	G	United States	Maine Red Claws	Denver
3	Jamal Branch	G	United States	Los Angeles D-Fenders	St. John's
4	Mark Tyndale	G	United States	Reno Bighorns	Temple
5	Ty Greene	G	United States	Delaware 87ers	USC Upstate
6	Joel Wright	F	United States	Iowa Energy	North Texas
7	Brett Comer	G	United States	Grand Rapids Drive	Florida Gulf Coast
8	Travis Releford	G	United States	Idaho Stampede	Kansas
9	Kourtney Roberson	G	United States	Raptors 905	Texas A&M
10	Karl Cochran	G	United States	Rio Grande Valley Vipers	Wofford
11	Melvin Johnson III	G	United States	Raptors 905	Arkansas State
12	Ian Chiles	C	United States	Los Angeles D-Fenders	Morgan State
13	Anthony Walker	F	United States	Fort Wayne Mad Ants	UT Arlington
14	Russell Byrd	F/G	United States	Sioux Falls Skyforce	Master's
15	Juvonte Reddic	F	United States	Canton Charge	VCU
16	Rodney Glasgow	G	United States	Austin Toros	VMI
17	John Dickson	F	United States	Bakersfield Jam	Sacramento State
18	Verdell Jones III	G	United States	Santa Cruz Warriors	Indiana
19	Kevin Capers	G	United States	Westchester Knicks	Florida Southern

=== Fourth round ===
Pick	Player	Pos.	Nationality	Team	College/Country
1	Da'Shonte Riley	C	United States	Idaho Stampede	Eastern Michigan
2	TJ Hallice	F	United States	Idaho Stampede	Mercer
3	Kentrell Gransberry	F/C	United States	Los Angeles D-Fenders	South Florida
4	Javier Carter	F	United States	Bakersfield Jam	South Alabama
5	Alex Harris	G	United States	Delaware 87ers	Cal State Fullerton
6	Justin Reynolds	F/C	United States	Texas Legends	Texas A&M Corpus Christi
7	Ismael Romero	F	Puerto Rico; Cuba	Grand Rapids Drive	Cuba
8	Trey Sumler	G	United States	Erie BayHawks	Western Carolina
9	Terry Whisnant	G	United States	Iowa Energy	East Carolina
10	Aqeel Quinn	G	United States	Rio Grande Valley Vipers	San Diego State
11	John Puk	C	United States	Raptors 905	Albany
12	Matt Ross	F	United States	Fort Wayne Mad Ants	Chicago State
13	Warren Niles	G	United States	Oklahoma City Blue	Oral Roberts
14	Jereal Scott	F	United States	Sioux Falls Skyforce	Stephen F. Austin
15	Joel Smith	G	United States	Canton Charge	Northeastern
16	Ruben Guillandeaux	F/G	United States	Austin Toros	La Salle
17	Jordan Downing	G	United States	Bakersfield Jam	Presbyterian
18	Earnest Ross	G	United States; Guam	Santa Cruz Warriors	Missouri
19	Jermaine Marshall	G	United States	Maine Red Claws	Arizona State

=== Fifth round ===
Pick	Player	Pos.	Nationality	Team	College/Country
1	Jeremy Williams	F	United States	Idaho Stampede	UTEP
2	Jordon Crawford	G	United States	Westchester Knicks	Bowling Green
3	Jon Octeus	G	United States	Texas Legends	Purdue
4	Steve Forbes	F	United States	Idaho Stampede	IPFW
5	Marlin Mason	F	United States	Delaware 87ers	Cleveland State
6	Thomas Bropleh	G	United States	Texas Legends	Boise State
7	Paul Williams	G	United States	Grand Rapids Drive	Dayton
8	Cory Dixon	F	United States	Erie BayHawks	New Orleans
9	Jourdan DeMuynck	F	United States	Iowa Energy	Prairie View A&M
10	Laquavius Cotton	F	United States	Rio Grande Valley Vipers	Delta State
11	Shaquille Keith	F	Canada	Raptors 905	Kilgore
12	Anthony Harris	G	United States	Fort Wayne Mad Ants	Miami (Florida)
13	Jarekious Bradley	G/F	United States	Oklahoma City Blue	SE Missouri State
14	Deshaunt Walker	G	United States	Sioux Falls Skyforce	Stephen F. Austin
15	Sampson Carter	F	United States	Canton Charge	UMass
16	Mouhamadou Ndoye	C	Senegal	Austin Spurs	Texas A&M–Commerce
17	Jordan Richard	C	United States	Reno Bighorns	Cal State Los Angeles
18	Brandon Wooley	G	United States	Santa Cruz Warriors	NW Oklahoma State
19	Quardell Young	G	United States	Maine Red Claws	Wisconsin–Whitewater

=== Sixth round ===
Pick	Player	Pos.	Nationality	Team	College/Country
1	Duke Mondy	G	United States	Westchester Knicks	Oakland
2	James Carlton	F	United States	Fort Wayne Mad Ants	Howard
3	Michael Craig	F	United States	Reno Bighorns	Southern Miss
4	Samuel Deguara	C	Malta; Italy	Erie BayHawks	Malta
5	Musa Abdul-Aleem	G	United States	Austin Toros	Troy
6	Reggis Onwukamuche	C	United States	Bakersfield Jam	Prairie View A&M
7	Terrence Drisdom	G	United States	Santa Cruz Warriors	Cal Poly Pomona

=== Seventh round ===
Pick	Player	Pos.	Nationality	Team	College/Country
1	Steve Weingarten	F	United States	Los Angeles D-Fenders	La Salle
2	Dondray Walker	F	United States	Reno Bighorns	Newberry
3	Stan Simpson	F	United States	Texas Legends	Memphis
4	Carlos Morla	C	Dominican Republic	Erie BayHawks	Dominican Republic
