= Joshua Braun =

American basketball player

Free agent
- Position: Shooting guard

Personal information
- Born: July 7, 1994 (age 32) Anthem, Arizona, U.S.
- Listed height: 1.93 m (6 ft 4 in)
- Listed weight: 88 kg (194 lb)

Career information
- High school: Boulder Creek (Anthem, Arizona); Westwind Prep (Phoenix, Arizona)
- College: Grand Canyon (2014–2018)
- NBA draft: 2018: undrafted
- Playing career: 2019–present

Career history
- 2019: Kalamunda Eastern Suns
- 2019–2021: Eisbären Bremerhaven
- 2024: Geraldton Buccaneers

Career highlights
- SBL MVP (2019); All-SBL First Team (2019); 2× First-team All-WAC (2016, 2017); Second-team All-WAC (2018); WAC All-Newcomer Team (2015)

Joshua David Braun (born July 7, 1994) is an American professional basketball player who last played for the Geraldton Buccaneers of the NBL1 West. He played four years of college basketball for the Grand Canyon Antelopes, where he finished as the school's second all-time leading scorer and set the record for most career 3-pointers made. He was also a two-time first-team All-WAC honoree. He made his professional debut in 2019 in Australia with the Kalamunda Eastern Suns of the State Basketball League (SBL), where he was named the SBL Most Valuable Player. He then played two seasons in Germany with Eisbären Bremerhaven of the ProA between 2019 and 2021.

== High school career ==
Born and raised in Anthem, Arizona, Braun attended Boulder Creek High School and played three seasons for the school's basketball team. As a freshman in 2009–10, he helped the school win its first state championship while averaging 10.4 points and 5.3 rebounds per game. He put Boulder Creek's program on the map when he blocked a potential-game winning layup in the last second of the state championship game. As a sophomore in 2010–11, he averaged 20.2 points and 9.5 rebounds per game en route to being named player of the year in the Northwest Region. As a junior in 2011–12, he averaged 18.5 points and 9.4 rebounds per game.

For his senior year of high school, Braun transferred to Westwind Preparatory Academy in Phoenix. The transfer to Westwind would provide much-needed increased exposure to recruiters since the school traveled the country playing top high school programs. However, during the summer in an AAU game, he tore the ACL in his right knee. An intense rehab regimen got him ready for the 2012–13 season, where he averaged 9.7 points for Westwind. In the spring, he tore the ACL in his other knee.

== College career ==
=== Redshirt season (2013–14) ===
Coming off two knee injuries to finish his high school career, Braun was left with just two college offers, one of them from Drake University. However, before he could take the offer from Drake, the school fired the entire coaching staff. He later inquired at Grand Canyon University (GCU), despite the fact that the school was a Division II program at the time. GCU were interested in him, but before he could commit, once again the coaching staff was let go.

The incoming coaching staff at GCU led by head coach Dan Majerle still had interest in Braun. Majerle was hired to navigate GCU through a four-year Division I transition, and on May 1, 2013, Braun became Majerle's first signing. However, Braun spent his first year at GCU as a redshirt after suffering a torn meniscus in one of his surgically repaired knees while practicing with the team in the lead-up to the 2013–14 season. Throughout the two-year ordeal, Braun ended up having four knee surgeries.

=== Freshman year (2014–15) ===
Braun made his debut for the Antelopes in the 2014–15 season and played power forward on a team that lacked rebounders. After playing sparingly over the first six games, an injury to a teammate saw Braun record 21 points and seven rebounds in 25 minutes on November 29 against Central Michigan. He posted a season-high 25 points against Texas Pan-American on January 24 and had a season-high 10 rebounds against Kansas City on January 29. He appeared in all 32 games with 26 starts, as he averaged 11.8 points and 4.9 rebounds per game. He led the Antelopes in points scored (379) and 3-point percentage (.381), while finishing eighth highest in the Western Athletic Conference (WAC) for field goal percentage (.460) and sixth in 3-point percentage. He subsequently earned WAC All-Newcomer Team honors.

=== Sophomore year (2015–16) ===
As a sophomore in 2015–16, Braun moved to guard and started 33 of 34 games while averaging 16.6 points and a career-high 5.2 rebounds. He earned first-team All-WAC honors and led the league in both 3-point field goal percentage and free throw percentage. He was honored as the WAC Player of the Week for the week of January 4–10 after recording 23 points and 11 rebounds on January 9 against New Mexico State. He scored 30 or more points three times, including a career-high 34 points on January 16 against Utah Valley.

=== Junior year (2016–17) ===
Braun came into his junior year having undergone knee and ankle surgery during the off-season. He entered the regular season as the Preseason WAC Player of the Year. On November 28, 2016, a painful knee limited him to 10 minutes and no points against SIU Edwardsville. He subsequently missed nine games and the entire month of December after undergoing further knee surgery. In his first game back on January 7, 2017, Braun scored a season-high 31 points (including a career-high 21 points in the first half) and made a career-high seven 3-pointers in an 82–72 win over Utah Valley. He earned WAC Player of the Week for the week of February 20–26 after averaging 28.5 points in wins over Chicago State and Kansas City. He led the WAC in 3-pointers made, and in 22 games in 2016–17, he averaged 17.5 points, 4.6 rebounds and 1.4 assists per game. He subsequently earned first-team All-WAC honors for the second straight year.

=== Senior year (2017–18) ===
Braun was again named Preseason WAC Player of the Year heading into his senior season. However, a slip in his shooting led to a drop from a career-high 17.5 points per game as a junior to a career-low 11.4 points per game in the 2017–18 season. On November 18, he scored 22 of his season-high 29 points in the first half of GCU's 76–51 win over Little Rock. With GCU eligible for postseason play for the first time following their four-year Division I transition, the Antelopes entered the 2018 WAC tournament as the third seed and reached the championship game, where they lost 72–58 to New Mexico State. Braun made just one 3-pointer and shot 6-of-20 overall over the three tournament games, including going scoreless in the quarterfinal against Kansas City. In the Antelopes' first-round loss to Mercer in the CBI tournament, Braun went scoreless on 0-of-7 shooting with five rebounds in 17 minutes in what was his final college game. For the season, he was named to the All-WAC second team.

For his career, Braun scored the second-most points (1,716) in the 69-season history of Grand Canyon basketball, ranking him behind only Bayard Forrest (2,195). He also finished with the record for most career 3-pointers made (257).

Braun, a graduate student, was considered a standout athletically and academically as he was a three-time Academic All-American (first team in 2016 and 2017; third team in 2018). He finished with a 3.60 GPA and earned the MBA degree.

=== College statistics ===
Year	Team	GP	GS	MPG	FG%	3P%	FT%	RPG	APG	SPG	BPG	PPG
2014–15	Grand Canyon	32	26	26.8	.460	.381	.775	4.9	.8	.8	.8	11.8
2015–16	Grand Canyon	34	33	30.7	.438	.392	.868	5.2	1.1	.8	.7	16.6
2016–17	Grand Canyon	22	22	33.6	.445	.416	.803	4.6	1.4	.5	.4	17.5
2017–18	Grand Canyon	34	34	29.4	.372	.340	.742	3.8	1.4	.8	.5	11.4
Career		122	115	29.8	.427	.381	.813	4.6	1.1	.7	.6	14.1

== Professional career ==
In August 2018, Braun was on the verge of joining German club Karlsruhe Lions when just days before he was set to leave Arizona, an equipment failure in the gym saw weights land on his foot and break some toes. He was consequently unable to join the team for the 2018–19 season.

In February 2019, Braun joined the Kalamunda Eastern Suns of the State Basketball League (SBL) in Australia. The Suns started the 2019 season with a 7–11 record before winning their next six. Braun scored 30 or more points ten times, including a season-high 37 points on June 22 in a 122–112 win over the East Perth Eagles. On July 19, he recorded 34 points and 13 rebounds in an 82–80 loss to the Lakeside Lightning. He went on to miss the last regular-season game and the finals due to an ankle injury. With a 13–13 record, the Suns finished eighth and lost 2–0 in the quarterfinals to the Joondalup Wolves. For the season, Braun played in the SBL All-Star Game for Team World and was named SBL Player of the Week twice. He led the league in 3-point percentage and free throw percentage and was named the SBL Most Valuable Player while earning All-SBL First Team honors. In 25 games, he averaged 26.5 points, 8.9 rebounds, 3.4 assists and 1.4 steals per game.

On August 16, 2019, Braun signed with Eisbären Bremerhaven of the German ProA for the 2019–20 season. The coach who wanted him at Karlsruhe in 2018, Michael Mai, was now the coach at Bremerhaven. On October 31, 2019, he scored a season-high 21 points against Science City Jena. Due to the COVID-19 pandemic, the season was cancelled in March 2020 with Bremerhaven in second place with a 20–7 record. In 24 games, Braun averaged 9.1 points and 4.3 rebounds per game.

In August 2020, Braun had his contract extended by Bremerhaven. On October 24, 2020, he scored a season-high 23 points against Ehingen Urspring. In 17 games during the 2020–21 season, he averaged 8.3 points and 2.2 rebounds per game.

In January 2024, Braun signed with the Geraldton Buccaneers of the NBL1 West for the 2024 season. On May 4, 2024, he had 28 points, eight assists and seven rebounds in a 96–87 win over the Warwick Senators. The following day, he suffered a hamstring injury against the Kalamunda Eastern Suns. He helped the Buccaneers reach the preliminary final, where he had 10 points in a 98–89 loss to the Willetton Tigers. In 16 games, he averaged 12.19 points, 3.75 rebounds and 3.06 assists per game.

== Off the court ==
In July 2022, Braun was hired as head of club basketball operations by Grand Canyon University.

== Personal life ==
Braun is of German roots. His grandfather was born in Worms while his grandmother comes from Yugoslavia, but is also of German descent. Both emigrated to Chicago because of World War II.

Braun is the son of David and Kathy. His father played soccer at the University of Wisconsin–Green Bay while his mother played volleyball at Fort Lewis College. His brother Justin also played basketball at Boulder Creek High School.

In July 2018, Braun married former GCU volleyball player Leigh Stonerook.
