= Jourdan DeMuynck =

American professional basketball player

Personal information
- Born: September 29, 1990 (age 36) Berkeley, California
- Listed height: 6 ft 6 in (1.98 m)
- Listed weight: 205 lb (93 kg)

Career information
- High school: Castro Valley (Castro Valley, California)
- College: Chabot (2008–2011); Prairie View A&M (2011–2013)
- NBA draft: 2013: undrafted
- Playing career: 2013–present
- Position: Small forward

Career history
- 2013–2014: Keravnos
- 2014: MZT Skopje
- 2016: Perth Redbacks
- 2016–2017: Union Tarbes Lourdes
- 2017–2018: Shahrdari Tabriz
- 2019: Perth Redbacks
- 2020: Abha

Career highlights
- Iranian Super League champion (2018); 2× SBL All-Star (2016, 2019); Second-team All-SWAC (2013)

Jourdan Kevan Tardieu DeMuynck (born September 29, 1990) is an American professional basketball player. He played college basketball for Chabot College and Prairie View A&M.

== College career ==
DeMuynck spent three years at Chabot College. As a redshirt sophomore in 2010–11, he earned Honorable Mention All-State and first-team All-Conference honors (Coast-North Division League). He finished second in the conference with 17 points per game, while averaging seven rebounds and four assists. He shot 44 percent from the field and ranked fifth in the Coast-North Division League with 3.9 assists and led the league with 2.5 steals.

In April 2011, DeMuynck transferred to Prairie View A&M University.

As a junior at Prairie View A&M in 2011–12, DeMuynck played in 32 games with 13 starts. He began the season as a starter but emerged as a valuable sixth man off the bench once SWAC play began. He led the Panthers in scoring with 10.1 points per game and ranked third in rebounding with 4.3 boards per game. He closed the regular season out strong with a then career-high 27 points against Alcorn State on March 3, 2012.

As a senior in 2012–13, DeMuynck averaged 15.7 points, 6.5 rebounds, 1.5 assists and 1.5 steals in 32 games for the Panthers. He subsequently earned second-team All-SWAC honors and was named to the SWAC All-Tournament Team after helping the Panthers reach the SWAC Tournament Final. In the SWAC Tournament Semifinal on March 15, 2013 against Jackson State, DeMuynck scored a career-high 37 points.

== Professional career ==
In August 2013, DeMuynck signed with Keravnos of Cyprus for the 2013–14 season. In 15 games for Keravnos, he averaged 11.7 points, 5.2 rebounds and 2.4 assists per game.

On August 22, 2014, DeMuynck signed with MZT Skopje of Macedonia for the 2014–15 season. On November 6, 2014, he parted ways with MZT after appearing in two league games and six Adriatic League games. In eight total games, he averaged 7.4 points, 4.2 rebounds and 1.8 assists per game.

On October 31, 2015, DeMuynck was selected by the Iowa Energy in the fifth round of the 2015 NBA Development League Draft. However, he was waived by the Energy six days later.

On January 10, 2016, DeMuynck signed with the Perth Redbacks for the 2016 State Basketball League season. In his debut for the Redbacks, he scored 49 points. He had nine games with 30 or more points, with three of those being 40-plus. In June 2016, he competed in the SBL All-Star Game. DeMuynck appeared in all 28 games for the Redbacks in 2016, averaging 26.5 points, 9.9 rebounds, 4.3 assists and 1.8 steals per game.

On November 17, 2016, DeMuynck signed with Union Tarbes Lourdes of the French NM1. His season was cut short after rupturing his Achilles tendon in February 2017. In 14 games for Lourdes, he averaged 13.9 points, 5.4 rebounds, 2.5 assists and 1.9 steals per game.

In November 2017, DeMuynck signed with Shahrdari Tabriz of the Iranian Super League.

In April 2019, DeMuynck joined the Perth Redbacks for the 2019 SBL season, returning to team for a second stint. On June 5, 2019, two days after competing in the SBL All-Star Game, he was released by the Redbacks. In eight games, he averaged 25.1 points, 6.5 rebounds and 4.4 assists per game.

In January 2020, DeMuynck moved to Saudi Arabia to play for Abha.

In June 2020, DeMuynck signed with Union Dax-Gamarde of the French NM1. He did not end up joining Dax-Gamarde due to family reasons.

== Personal life ==
DeMuynck is French on his mother's side. He subsequently holds a French passport.
