= Maddison Allen =

Australian basketball player

Personal information
- Born: 3 July 1993 (age 33) Newcastle, New South Wales
- Listed height: 6 ft 3 in (1.91 m)

Career information
- High school: John Paul (Brisbane, Queensland)
- College: California Poly (2012–2014); Santa Clara (2014–2016)
- Playing career: 2016–present
- Position: Forward-Center

Career history
- 2016–2017: Canberra Capitals
- 2018–2020: Perth Lynx
Medals
Basketball
Representing Australia

Maddison Allen (born 3 July 1993) is an Australian professional basketball player.

== College ==
Allen began her college career at California Polytechnic State University in San Luis Obispo, California, playing for the Mustangs. After her second year of eligibility, Allen would then transfer to Santa Clara University in Santa Clara, California where she would join the Broncos.

=== Statistics ===
Year	Team	GP	GS	MPG	FG%	3P%	FT%	RPG	APG	SPG	BPG	TO	PPG
2012–13	California Poly	8	0	13.5	.375	.000	.636	2.5	0.1	0.5	1.3	0.5	2.4
2013–14	California Poly	22	10	16.7	.407	.000	.647	5.1	1.0	0.3	1.1	1.5	3.5
2014–15	Santa Clara	27	8	14.5	.452	.000	.533	3.6	0.4	0.3	1.2	1.1	3.7
2015–16	Santa Clara	Injured											
Career		57	18	15.2	.425	.000	.545	4.0	0.6	0.3	1.2	1.1	3.4

== Career ==
=== WNBL ===
Allen would begin her professional career with the Canberra Capitals after signing for the 2016–17 WNBL season. After joining the Capitals, Allen would play alongside the likes of Marianna Tolo and Carly Wilson.

In 2018, Allen would return to the league after signing a full-time contract with the Perth Lynx for the 2018–19 season. Allen was picked up by the Lynx after strong showings with the Rockingham Flames in the SBL. In her first season with the Lynx, Allen was one of the league's leading shot blockers and she would also make her WNBL Finals debut.

== National team ==
=== Youth Level ===
In 2010, Allen made her international debut for the Sapphires during an international series against Japan ahead of the World Championships that year. Allen was not named to the final roster for the Under-17 World Championship in France.
