= 2020 State Basketball League season =

- League: State Basketball League
- Sport: Basketball
- Duration: Season that was scheduled: 14 March – 25 July (Regular season); 31 July – 22 August (Finals)
- Games: 26 (men); 22 (women)
- Teams: 14 (men); 12 (women)

SBL seasons
- ← 2019 2021 →

The 2020 State Basketball League season was scheduled to be the 32nd season of the State Basketball League (SBL), but due to the COVID-19 pandemic, the season was cancelled and later replaced by the amateur-based West Coast Classic.

== Pre-season ==
The 2020 SBL Pre-Season Blitz was held at Bendat Basketball Centre over two weekends: the first for regional men's teams on Saturday 29 February and Sunday 1 March, and the second for metro men's and women's teams on Friday 6 March and Saturday 7 March.

== Season that was scheduled ==
The regular season was set to begin on Saturday 14 March and end on Saturday 25 July after 20 rounds of competition. A small-scale round 1 for the men was scheduled to open the season, with the Goldfields Giants playing away to the Geraldton Buccaneers and Cockburn Cougars. A full round of fixtured games in round 2 was scheduled for the remaining teams to make their season debuts. Round 1 was scheduled as a bye round for the women, with all 12 teams making their season debuts in round 2. In continuing tradition, there was to be Easter Round (5), Anzac Round (6), Women's Round (9), Heritage Round (13), and Mental Health Awareness Round (18). The finals was then scheduled to take place between Friday 31 July and Saturday 22 August under a revised finals model similar to the NBL1 format.

In the wake of the coronavirus outbreak in Australia in early to mid March 2020, the season was suspended indefinitely with no games having taken place. On 14 May 2020, the season was officially cancelled due to the ongoing pandemic.

== West Coast Classic ==
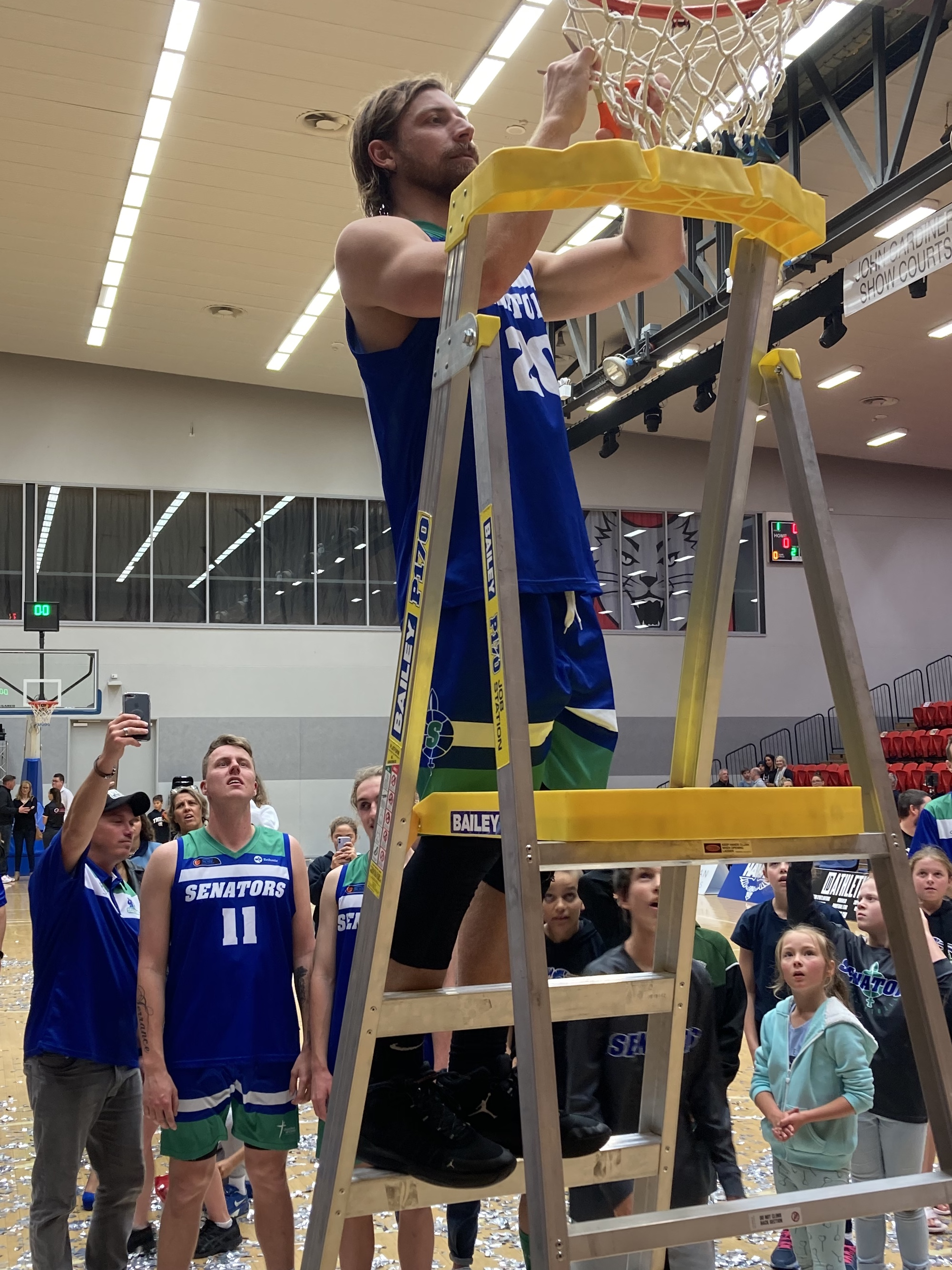
Corban Wroe, 2020 WCC Grand Final MVP

To fill the void of a cancelled SBL season, a state amateur competition known as the West Coast Classic (WCC) was announced on 12 June 2020. All 14 Men's SBL teams and all 12 Women's SBL teams competed in the 10-week competition. The competition began on Friday 24 July and had all teams playing each other once in a home and away fixture. The top four teams following the regular season competed in the finals, with semi-finals on Friday 25 September followed by the women's grand final on Saturday 26 September and the men's grand final on Sunday 27 September. Both grand finals were played at Bendat Basketball Centre.

=== Women ===
The Joondalup Wolves finished atop the regular-season standings with a 10–1 record. The semi-finals featured the Wolves against the fourth-seeded Rockingham Flames and the second-seeded Warwick Senators against the third-seeded Perry Lakes Hawks, with the Wolves defeating the Flames 101–48 and the Hawks defeating the Senators 95–70. In the grand final, the Wolves defeated the Hawks 72–54 behind 13 points and 12 rebounds from game MVP Kayla Steindl.

=== Men ===
The Warwick Senators finished atop the regular-season standings with a 12–1 record. The semi-finals featured the Senators against the fourth-seeded Lakeside Lightning and the second-seeded Perry Lakes Hawks against the third-seeded Joondalup Wolves, with the Senators defeating the Lightning 92–84 and the Hawks defeating the Wolves 96–70. In the grand final, the Senators defeated the Hawks 96–81 behind 15 points, six rebounds and six assists from game MVP Corban Wroe.
