= Kalamunda Eastern Suns =

- Leagues: NBL1 West
- Founded: 2008
- History: Kalamunda Eastern Suns; 2008–present
- Arena: Ray Owen Sports Centre
- Location: Lesmurdie, Western Australia
- Team colors: Orange, black, white
- CEO: Drew Tennant
- Chairman: Jarod Avila
- Head coach: M: Aaron Trahair; W: Derrick Washington Jr.
- Championships: 0
- Website: NBL1.com.au

Kalamunda Eastern Suns is an NBL1 West club based in Perth, Western Australia. The club fields a team in both the Men's and Women's NBL1 West. The club is a division of Kalamunda & Districts Basketball Association (KDBA), the major administrative basketball organisation in Perth's eastern region. The Suns play their home games at Ray Owen Sports Centre.

== Club history ==
=== Background ===
Kalamunda & Districts Basketball Association (KDBA) was incorporated on 1 October 1971. In 1991, KDBA affiliated with Basketball Western Australia and entered teams as the Kalamunda Hornets in the WA Junior State League competition. In 2001, Eastern Region Basketball Association (ERBA) was established as a junior representative association following the amalgamation of KDBA, Swan Mustangs (SDBA), and Mundaring (HRBA). The teams played as the Eastern Suns. Initially there was input from all three associations, but this deteriorated when SDBA found themselves in financial difficulty with increasing debt to Basketball Western Australia. KDBA was in a position to seek a license from the State Basketball League (SBL) but was unwilling to assume the SDBA debt as part of their license (in excess of $40,000). The Swan City Mustangs SBL club and the Association ceased to operate following the 2003 season.

In 2006, ERBA was disbanded and KDBA introduced the Kalamunda Eastern Suns. The following year, KDBA were granted an SBL license for the 2008 season.

=== SBL / NBL1 West ===
In 2008, the Suns debuted in both the Men's SBL and Women's SBL, with the women's team reaching the semi-finals in their first season. In the 2013 season, the women's team made their first SBL Grand Final, where they lost 72–47 to the Wanneroo Wolves. Between 2008 and 2015, the women's team only missed the finals once.

In the 2019 season, the men's team recorded their most wins in a season with 13, making the finals for the first time since 2012 behind league MVP, Joshua Braun.

In 2021, the SBL was rebranded as NBL1 West.

== Accolades ==
Women

- Championships: Nil
- Grand Final appearances: 1 (2013)
- Minor premierships: Nil

Men

- Championships: Nil
- Grand Final appearances: Nil
- Minor premierships: Nil
