= 2024 NBL1 West season =

- League: NBL1 West
- Sport: Basketball
- Duration: 28 March – 20 July (Regular season); 26 July – 10 August (Finals)
- Games: 22 (men); 20 (women)
- Teams: 14 (men); 13 (women)

Regular season
- Minor premiers: M: Geraldton Buccaneers; W: Rockingham Flames
- Season MVP: M: Joel Murray (Mandurah Magic); W: Teige Morrell (Lakeside Lightning)
- Top scorer: M: Joel Murray (Mandurah Magic); W: Anneli Maley (Perth Redbacks)

Finals
- Champions: M: Mandurah Magic; W: Rockingham Flames
- Runners-up: M: Willetton Tigers; W: Cockburn Cougars
- Grand Final MVP: M: Joel Murray (Mandurah Magic); W: Alexandra Sharp (Rockingham Flames)

NBL1 West seasons
- ← 2023 2025 →

The 2024 NBL1 West season was the fourth season of the NBL1 West and 35th overall in State Basketball League (SBL) / NBL1 West history. The regular season began on Thursday 28 March and ended on Saturday 20 July. The finals began on Friday 26 July and concluded with both the women's grand final and the men's grand final on Saturday 10 August.

The 2024 NBL1 season concluded with the third annual NBL1 National Finals being held at UniSC Arena and Caloundra Indoor Stadium on the Sunshine Coast.

== Regular season ==
The regular season began on Thursday 28 March and ended on Saturday 20 July after 17 rounds of competition. Easter games in round 1 on a Thursday night opened the season, followed by Anzac Round in round 5 as well as Pink Round (7), Heritage Round (10), Mental Health Round (12) and First Nations Round (15).

=== Standings ===
Men's ladder

Pos	Team	Pld	W	L	Pts	Qualification
1	Geraldton Buccaneers	22	20	2	40	Finals
2	Joondalup Wolves	22	16	6	32	Finals
3	Willetton Tigers	22	15	7	30	Finals
4	Mandurah Magic	22	13	9	26	Finals
5	Goldfields Giants	22	13	9	26	Finals
6	East Perth Eagles	22	13	9	26	Finals
7	Rockingham Flames	22	13	9	26	Finals
8	Warwick Senators	22	11	11	22	Finals
9	Perry Lakes Hawks	22	9	13	18	
10	Lakeside Lightning	22	8	14	16	
11	Kalamunda Eastern Suns	22	7	15	14	
12	South West Slammers	22	6	16	12	
13	Cockburn Cougars	22	5	17	10	
14	Perth Redbacks	22	5	17	10	

Source: NBL1

Women's ladder

Pos	Team	Pld	W	L	Pts	Qualification
1	Rockingham Flames	20	18	2	36	Finals
2	Warwick Senators	20	17	3	34	Finals
3	Cockburn Cougars	20	16	4	32	Finals
4	Perry Lakes Hawks	20	14	6	28	Finals
5	Willetton Tigers	20	12	8	24	Finals
6	Perth Redbacks	20	11	9	22	Finals
7	Lakeside Lightning	20	10	10	20	Finals
8	Joondalup Wolves	20	9	11	18	Finals
9	Mandurah Magic	20	8	12	16	
10	Kalamunda Eastern Suns	20	6	14	12	
11	East Perth Eagles	20	6	14	12	
12	Goldfields Giants	20	3	17	6	
13	South West Slammers	20	0	20	0	

Source: NBL1

== Finals ==
The finals began on Friday 26 July and consisted of four rounds. The finals concluded with the women's grand final and the men's grand final on Saturday 10 August. Both grand finals were played at RAC Arena in front of 6,460 people.

=== Men's bracket ===
Qualifying and elimination finals
Jul 27, Activewest Stadium
1	Geraldton Buccaneers	106
4	Mandurah Magic	100
Jul 27, Niels Hansen Basketball Stadium
5	Goldfields Giants	103
8	Warwick Senators	88
Jul 27, Morley Sport and Recreation Centre
6	East Perth Eagles	81
7	Rockingham Flames	104
Jul 27, HBF Arena
2	Joondalup Wolves	96
3	Willetton Tigers	78

Semi-finals
Aug 2, Mandurah ARC
Mandurah Magic	110
Goldfields Giants	93
Aug 1, Willetton Basketball Stadium
Willetton Tigers	108
Rockingham Flames	103

Preliminary finals
Aug 3, Activewest Stadium
Geraldton Buccaneers	89
Willetton Tigers	98
Aug 4, HBF Arena
Joondalup Wolves	88
Mandurah Magic	91

Grand final
Aug 10, RAC Arena
Willetton Tigers	89
Mandurah Magic	91

==== Grand Final summary ====
Kayo Sports

10 August 2024
7:00 pm

Box score
Recap
Highlights

Willetton Tigers 89, Mandurah Magic 91
Scoring by quarter: 29–27, 23–18, 23–18, 14–28
Pts: Michael Dupree 32; Rebs: Thomas Gerovich 11; Asts: Michael Vigor 11	Pts: Joel Murray 30; Rebs: Michael Durr 19; Asts: Joel Murray 3
Mandurah wins NBL1 West Championship

RAC Arena, Perth
MVP: Joel Murray (Magic)

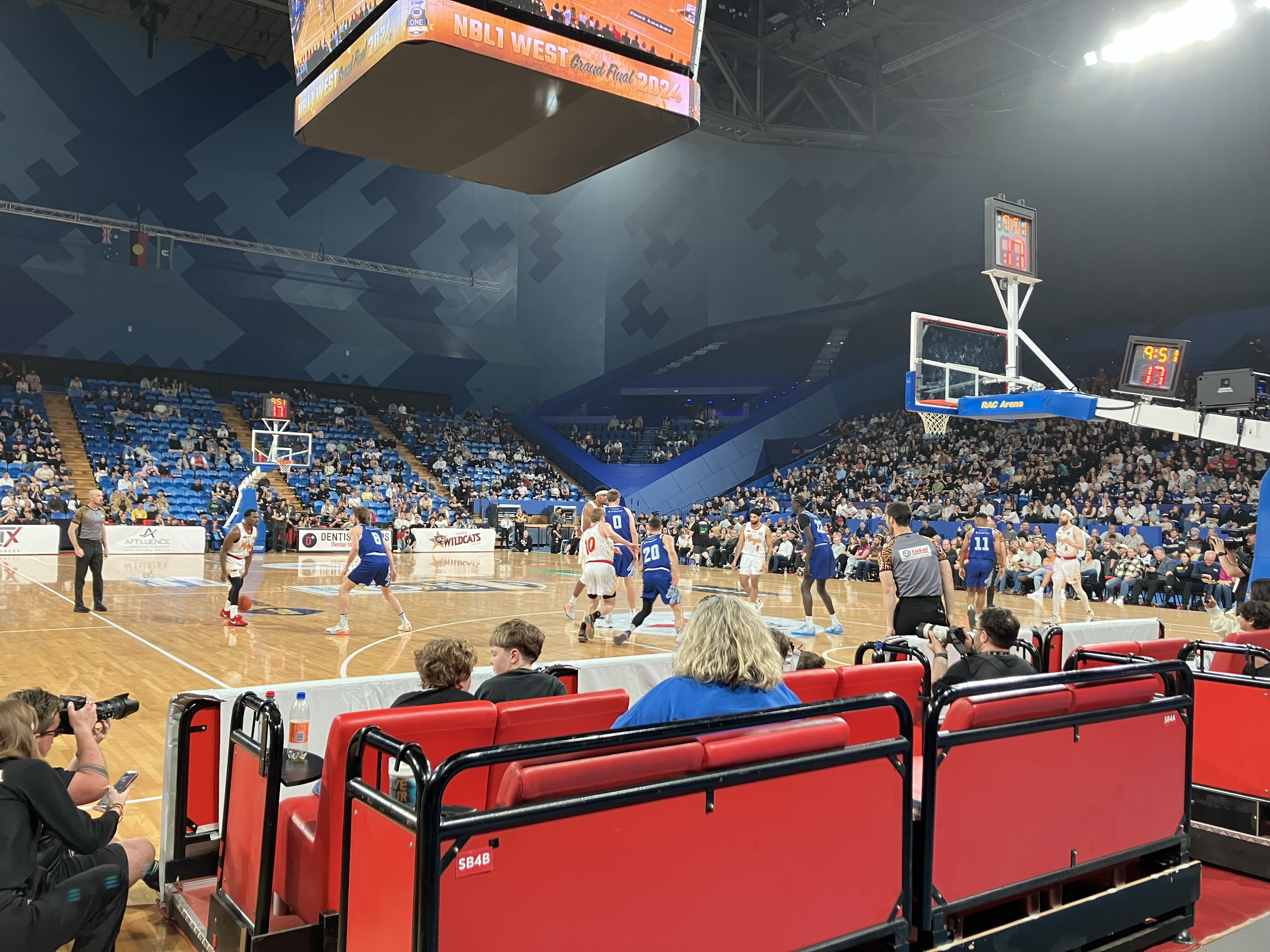
NBL1 West Men's Grand Final

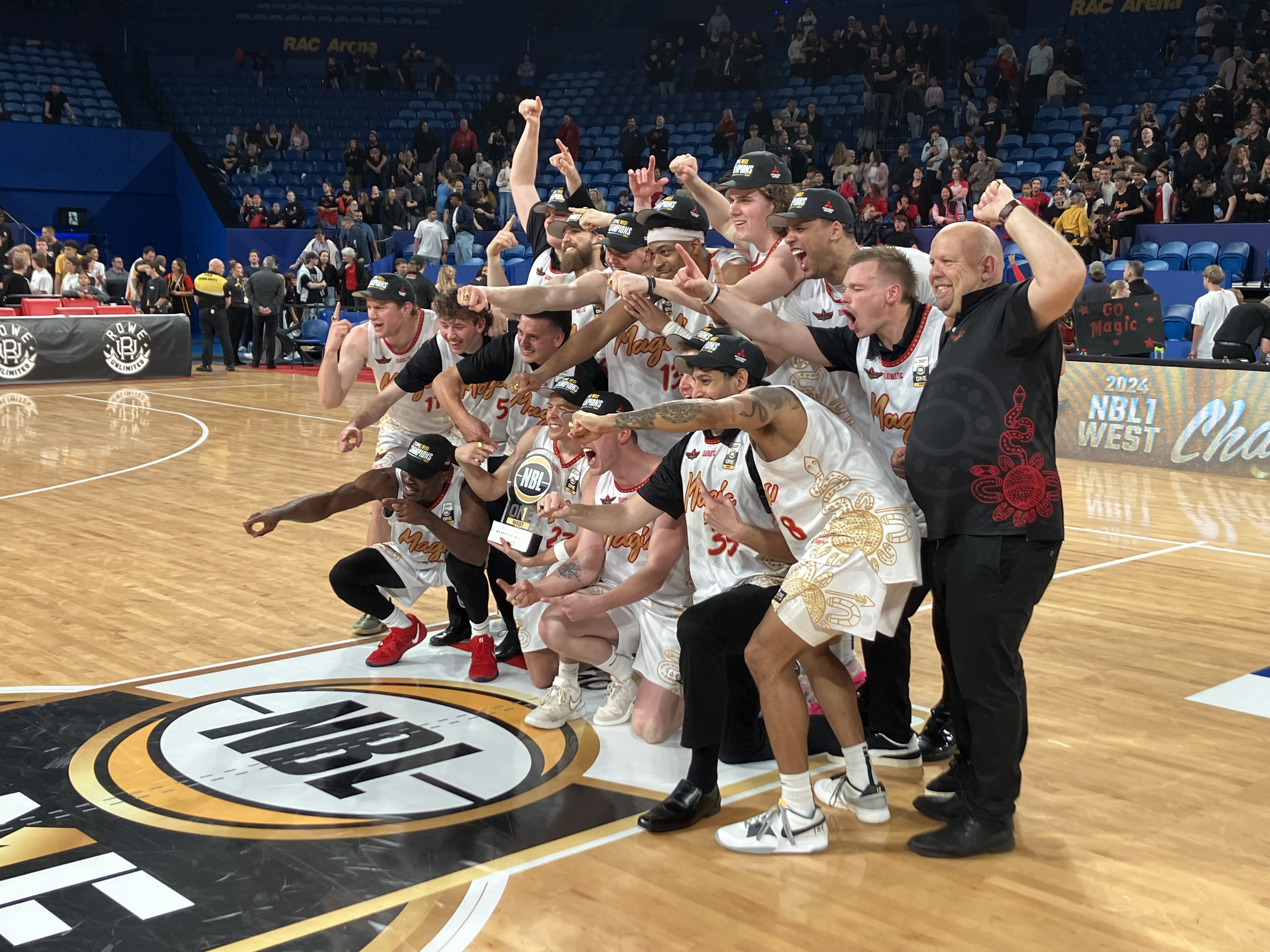
Mandurah Magic 2024 Men's NBL1 West champions

=== Women's bracket ===
Qualifying and elimination finals
Jul 27, Mike Barnett Sports Complex
1	Rockingham Flames	84
4	Perry Lakes Hawks	75
Jul 26, Willetton Basketball Stadium
5	Willetton Tigers	92
8	Joondalup Wolves	76
Jul 26, Belmont Oasis Leisure Centre
6	Perth Redbacks	56
7	Lakeside Lightning	99
Jul 26, Warwick Stadium
2	Warwick Senators	72
3	Cockburn Cougars	88

Semi-finals
Aug 1, Bendat Basketball Centre
Perry Lakes Hawks	88
Willetton Tigers	80
Aug 1, Warwick Stadium
Warwick Senators	63
Lakeside Lightning	67

Preliminary finals
Aug 3, Mike Barnett Sports Complex
Rockingham Flames	92
Lakeside Lightning	86
Aug 3, Wally Hagan Stadium
Cockburn Cougars	93
Perry Lakes Hawks	70

Grand final
Aug 10, RAC Arena
Rockingham Flames	97
Cockburn Cougars	81

==== Grand Final summary ====
Kayo Sports

10 August 2024
4:30 pm

Box score
Recap
Highlights #1
Highlights #2

Rockingham Flames 97, Cockburn Cougars 81
Scoring by quarter: 19–29, 23–14, 22–19, 33–19
Pts: Jessica Jakens 23; Rebs: Nes'eya Parker-Williams 12; Asts: Gandini, Sharp 6 each	Pts: Alex Ciabattoni 30; Rebs: Daniel Raber 17; Asts: Daniel Raber 6
Rockingham wins NBL1 West Championship

RAC Arena, Perth
MVP: Alexandra Sharp (Flames)

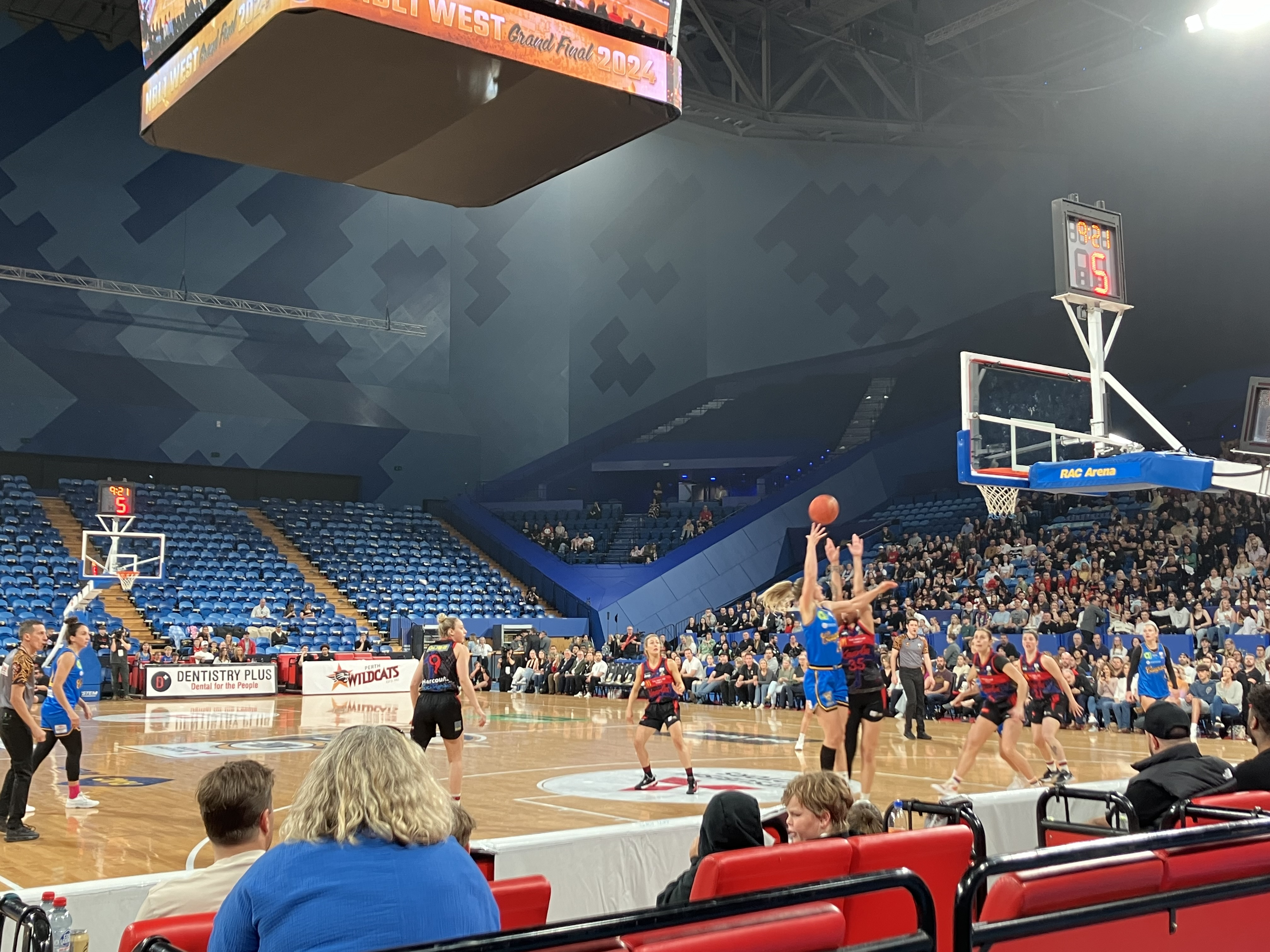
NBL1 West Women's Grand Final

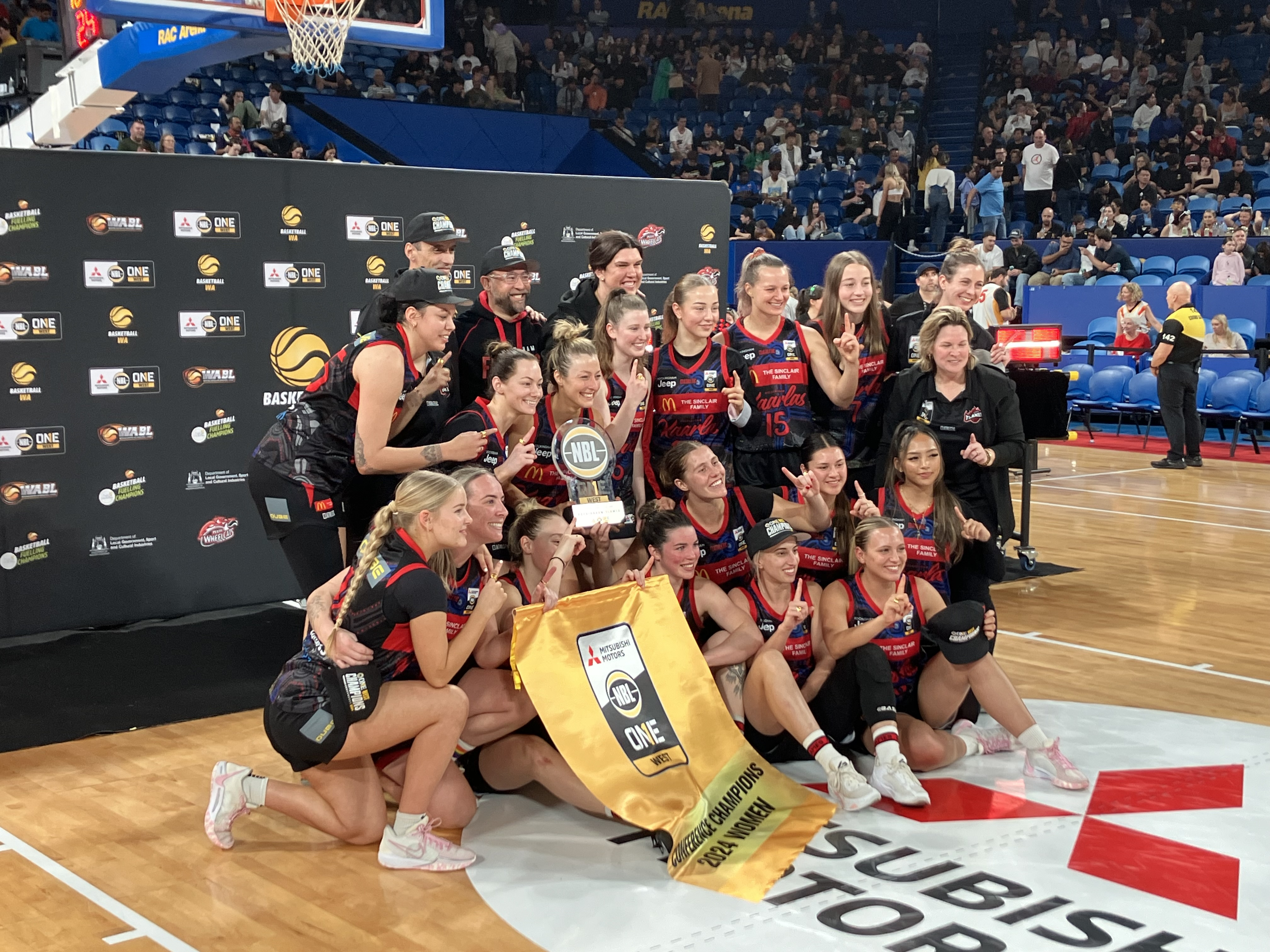
Rockingham Flames 2024 Women's NBL1 West champions

== Awards ==
=== Player of the Week ===
Round	Men's Player	Team	Women's Player	Team	Ref
1	Michael Harris	Warwick Senators	Teige Morrell	Lakeside Lightning	
2	C. J. Turnage	Joondalup Wolves	Tiahna Sears	Kalamunda Eastern Suns	
3	Joel Murray	Mandurah Magic	Imani Guy	Willetton Tigers	
4	Randy Bell	Goldfields Giants	Ashleigh Isenbarger	Perry Lakes Hawks	
5	Joel Murray	Mandurah Magic	Melisa Brčaninović	Willetton Tigers	
6	Mike Adewunmi	Lakeside Lightning	Mary Baskerville	East Perth Eagles	
7	Joel Murray	Mandurah Magic	Emma Gandini	Rockingham Flames	
8	Joel Murray	Mandurah Magic	Georgia Pineau	Rockingham Flames	
9	Randy Bell	Goldfields Giants	Daniel Raber	Cockburn Cougars	
10	Marek Nelson	Kalamunda Eastern Suns	Natalie Chou	Perth Redbacks	
11	Marek Nelson	Kalamunda Eastern Suns	Teige Morrell	Lakeside Lightning	
12	Joel Murray	Mandurah Magic	Anneli Maley	Perth Redbacks	
13	Michael Harris	Warwick Senators	Karly Murphy	Warwick Senators	
14	Joel Murray	Mandurah Magic	Anneli Maley	Perth Redbacks	
15	De'Sean Parsons	Goldfields Giants	Emma Clarke	Joondalup Wolves	
16	Marshall Nelson	Willetton Tigers	Daniel Raber	Cockburn Cougars	
17	Mike Adewunmi	Lakeside Lightning	Chloe Forster	Warwick Senators	

=== Coach of the Month ===
Month	Men's Coach	Team	Women's Coach	Team	Ref
Rd 1–4	David Morrell	Joondalup Wolves	Marcus Wong	Rockingham Flames	
Rd 5–9	Mark Utley	Mandurah Magic	Marcus Wong	Rockingham Flames	
Rd 10–14	Dayle Joseph	Geraldton Buccaneers	Brad Robbins	Warwick Senators	
Rd 15–17	N/A		N/A		

=== Statistics leaders ===
Stats as of the end of the regular season

Category	Men's Player	Team	Stat	Women's Player	Team	Stat
Points per game	Joel Murray	Mandurah Magic	34.32	Anneli Maley	Perth Redbacks	23.09
Rebounds per game	Michael Durr	Mandurah Magic	15.20	Anneli Maley	Perth Redbacks	16.64
Assists per game	Joel Murray	Mandurah Magic	7.37	Chloe Forster	Warwick Senators	6.05
Steals per game	Marek Nelson	Kalamunda Eastern Suns	3.09	Natalie Chou	Perth Redbacks	4.00
Blocks per game	Alex Holcombe	South West Slammers	2.55	Jessie Edwards	Cockburn Cougars	1.67
Field goal percentage	Gorjok Gak	Rockingham Flames	64.00%	Alex Ciabattoni	Cockburn Cougars	60.17%
3-pt field goal percentage	Jonathan Wade	Joondalup Wolves	47.06%	Emma Gandini	Rockingham Flames	40.56%
Free throw percentage	Miles Gibson	Perth Redbacks	90.54%	Melisa Brčaninović	Willetton Tigers	87.50%

=== Regular season ===
The 2024 Basketball WA Annual Awards Night was held on Saturday 20 July at Crown Perth.

- Men's Most Valuable Player: Joel Murray (Mandurah Magic)
- Women's Most Valuable Player: Teige Morrell (Lakeside Lightning)
- Men's Coach of the Year: Dayle Joseph (Geraldton Buccaneers)
- Women's Coach of the Year: Brad Robbins (Warwick Senators)
- Men's Defensive Player of the Year: Michael Durr (Mandurah Magic)
- Women's Defensive Player of the Year: Emma Gandini (Rockingham Flames)
- Men's Youth Player of the Year: Lachlan Bertram (Mandurah Magic)
- Women's Youth Player of the Year: Stephanie Gorman (Cockburn Cougars)
- Sixth Man of the Year: Roosevelt Williams Jr. (Willetton Tigers)
- Sixth Woman of the Year: Mikayla Pirini (Perth Redbacks)
- Men's Leading Scorer: Joel Murray (Mandurah Magic)
- Women's Leading Scorer: Anneli Maley (Perth Redbacks)
- Men's Leading Rebounder: Michael Durr (Mandurah Magic)
- Women's Leading Rebounder: Anneli Maley (Perth Redbacks)
- Men's Golden Hands: (Note: Golden Hands Award winner is determined by the following equation: (Total Assists + Total Steals – Total Turnovers) / Games Played = Golden Hands Award Rating.) Joel Murray (Mandurah Magic)
- Women's Golden Hands: Chloe Forster (Warwick Senators)
- All-NBL1 West Men's 1st Team:
  - Gorjok Gak (Rockingham Flames)
  - Michael Harris (Warwick Senators)
  - Joel Murray (Mandurah Magic)
  - De'Sean Parsons (Goldfields Giants)
  - C. J. Turnage (Joondalup Wolves)
- All-NBL1 West Men's 2nd Team:
  - Randy Bell (Goldfields Giants)
  - Nik DeSantis (Geraldton Buccaneers)
  - Michael Durr (Mandurah Magic)
  - Marek Nelson (Kalamunda Eastern Suns)
  - Todd Withers (Warwick Senators)
- All-NBL1 West Women's 1st Team:
  - Natalie Chou (Perth Redbacks)
  - Alex Ciabattoni (Cockburn Cougars)
  - Chloe Forster (Warwick Senators)
  - Anneli Maley (Perth Redbacks)
  - Teige Morrell (Lakeside Lightning)
- All-NBL1 West Women's 2nd Team:
  - Stacey Barr (Warwick Senators)
  - Melisa Brčaninović (Willetton Tigers)
  - Emma Gandini (Rockingham Flames)
  - Marnelle Garraud (Lakeside Lightning)
  - Ashleigh Isenbarger (Perry Lakes Hawks)
- Men's All-Defensive Team:
  - Michael Durr (Mandurah Magic)
  - Gorjok Gak (Rockingham Flames)
  - Johny Narkle (Geraldton Buccaneers)
  - David Okwera (East Perth Eagles)
  - Todd Withers (Warwick Senators)
- Women's All-Defensive Team:
  - Natalie Chou (Perth Redbacks)
  - Emma Gandini (Rockingham Flames)
  - Stephanie Gorman (Cockburn Cougars)
  - Teige Morrell (Lakeside Lightning)
  - Mia Satie (Perry Lakes Hawks)
- Men's All-Youth Team:
  - Lachlan Bertram (Mandurah Magic)
  - Robert Griechen (Geraldton Buccaneers)
  - Josh Hunt (Cockburn Cougars)
  - Pharrell Keats (South West Slammers)
  - George Pearl (Warwick Senators)
- Women's All-Youth Team:
  - Marnelle Garraud (Lakeside Lightning)
  - Stephanie Gorman (Cockburn Cougars)
  - Claire Jacobs (Willetton Tigers)
  - Brooke Malone (Perth Redbacks)
  - Millie McCarthy (Perry Lakes Hawks)

=== Finals ===
- Men's Grand Final MVP: Joel Murray (Mandurah Magic)
- Women's Grand Final MVP: Alexandra Sharp (Rockingham Flames)

== See also ==
- 2024 NBL1 season
