= State Basketball League Rookie of the Year Award =

The State Basketball League Rookie of the Year was an annual State Basketball League (SBL) award given between 1992 and 2003 to the best rookie in both the Men's SBL and Women's SBL.

== Winners ==
Year	WSBL		MSBL		Ref
Year	Player	Team	Player	Team	Ref
1992	Jody Griffith	Souwest Slammers	Richard Kvesich	Wanneroo Wolves	
1993	Narelle Henry	Stirling Senators	C. J. Bruton	Perry Lakes Hawks	
1994	Sharee Glover	Souwest Slammers	Daniel Cadby	Wanneroo Wolves	
1995	Dayle Carnachan	Wanneroo Wolves	Anthony Exeter	Rockingham Flames	
1996	Natalie Kastropil	Cockburn Cougars	Peter Sinfield	Perry Lakes Hawks	
1997	Christine Boyd	Wanneroo Wolves	James Harvey	Cockburn Cougars	
1998	Rohanee Cox	Willetton Tigers	Trent Mayger	Wanneroo Wolves	
1999	Kelli Hayward	Wanneroo Wolves	Stephen Watts	Wanneroo Wolves	
2000	Alicia Rinaldi	East Perth Eagles	Matt Burston	Perry Lakes Hawks	
2001	Belinda Gibb	Lakeside Lightning	Doolan Rush	Willetton Tigers	
2002	Lauren Clarke	Perth Redbacks	Carlin Hughes	Rockingham Flames	
2003	Carli Boyanich	Perry Lakes Hawks	Nick Burston	Perry Lakes Hawks	
