= Joel Murray (basketball) =

American basketball player (born 1999)

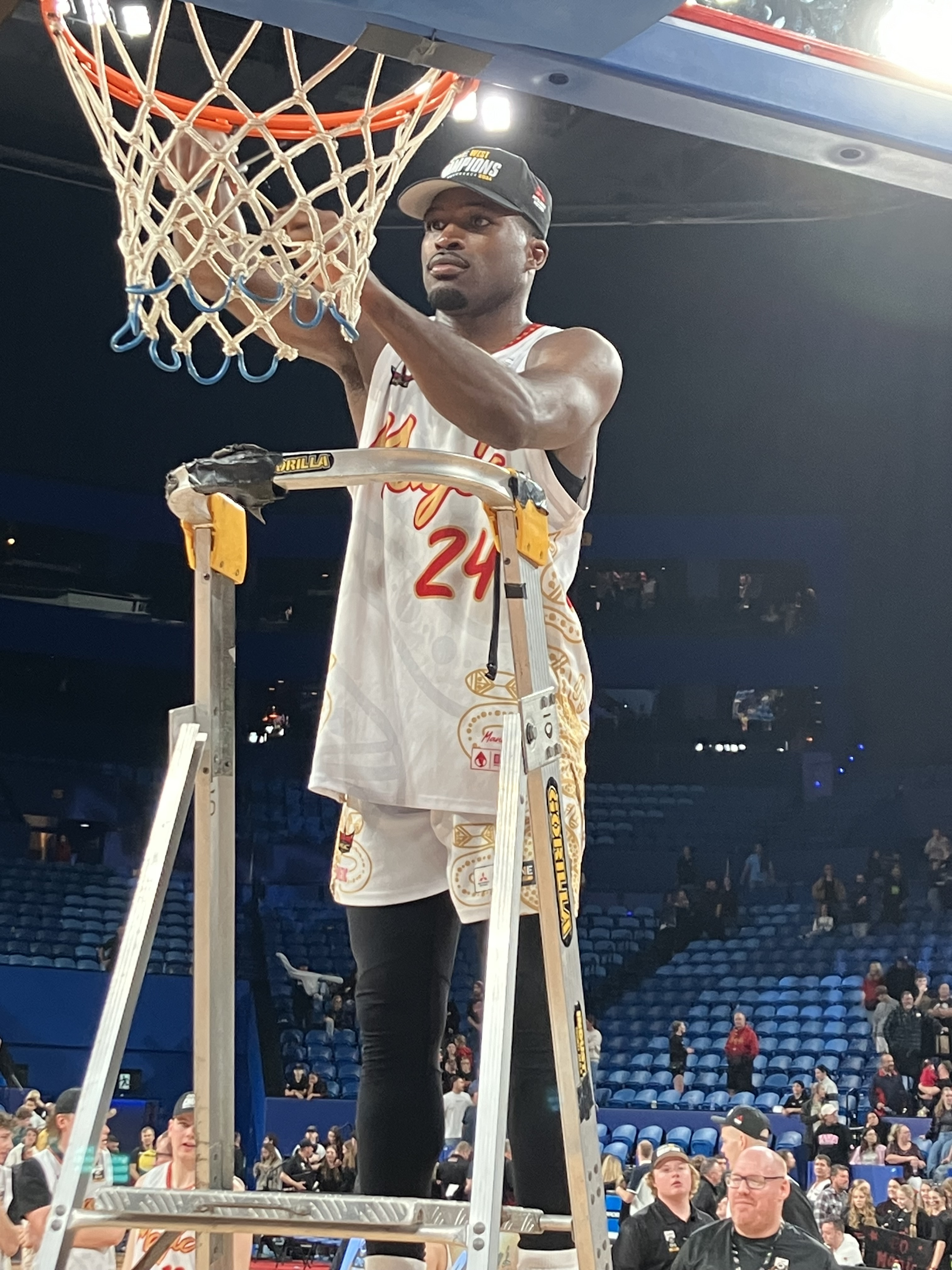
- Murray with the Mandurah Magic in 2024

No. 13 – Antwerp Giants
- Position: Point guard
- League: BNXT League

Personal information
- Born: November 23, 1999 (age 26)
- Listed height: 6 ft 0 in (1.83 m)
- Listed weight: 170 lb (77 kg)

Career information
- High school: Rowlett (Rowlett, Texas)
- College: West Texas A&M (2018–2021); Long Beach State (2021–2023)
- NBA draft: 2023: undrafted
- Playing career: 2024–present

Career history
- 2024: Mandurah Magic
- 2024–2025: LWD Basket
- 2025–present: Antwerp Giants

Career highlights
- BNXT League champion (2026); Belgian League champion (2026); Belgian Cup champion (2026); NBL1 West champion (2024); NBL1 West Grand Final MVP (2024); NBL1 West Most Valuable Player (2024); All-NBL1 West First Team (2024); NBL1 West scoring champion (2024); NBL1 West Golden Hands Award (2024); First-team All-Big West (2022); 2× First-team All-LSC (2020, 2021); Third-team All-LSC (2019); 3× LSC All-Defensive Team (2019–2021); LSC tournament MVP (2020)

Joel Murray (born November 23, 1999) is an American professional basketball player for Antwerp Giants of the BNXT League. He played college basketball for the West Texas A&M Buffaloes and Long Beach State Beach. He was named first-team All-Big West in 2022 before an injury in 2023 ended his final college season with Long Beach State prematurely. He joined the Mandurah Magic of the NBL1 West in Australia in 2024, where he was named the NBL1 West Most Valuable Player and led the team to the NBL1 West championship.

== High school career ==
Murray attended Rowlett High School in Rowlett, Texas, where he was considered a versatile scorer. In December 2016, he hit a game-winning 3-pointer against Highland Park High School. He hit another game winner the following month against Garland High School. During his three-year varsity career, he played in 88 games while averaging 10.5 points and 1.2 assists per game, including 13.9 points per game as a senior. He earned All-District honors three times including a pair of First Team selections as a junior and senior. He was also named an All-Region honoree and the Highland Tournament MVP as a senior while picking up All-Tournament Team accolades at the Allen Tournament. He also competed in track and football at Rowlett.

== College career ==
=== West Texas A&M (2018–2021) ===
When Murray graduated from high school in 2018, his only basketball offer came from Independence Community College in Kansas. He accepted the offer to Independence and was set to play for the junior college team. However, before Murray had the chance to play in his first game, West Texas A&M gave him an offer to come back home and play Division II basketball.

As a freshman at West Texas A&M in 2018–19, Murray appeared in 38 games with 34 starts, averaging 11.7 points, 3.2 rebounds, 3.7 assists and 1.8 steals in 28.3 minutes per game. His 67 steals were the most by a freshman in program history and second-most in a single season in program history. He scored in double figures in 24 games including a season-high 26 points against Texas A&M-Kingsville on February 16. He was named third-team All-LSC and LSC All-Defensive Team.

As a sophomore in 2019–20, Murray started all 33 games and averaged 19.9 points, 4.3 rebounds, 4.5 assists and 2.0 steals per game. He scored in double figures in 31 games including twice scoring a season-high 32 points, the first against UT Permian Basin on February 1 and the second against Texas A&M-Commerce on March 6. He was named most valuable player of the LSC tournament after leading the Buffaloes to victory in the championship game against St. Edward's. The team had an overall record of 32–1 and were about to head to the Regional Championships before COVID-19 canceled the rest of the postseason. He earned All-American honors and was named first-team All-LSC and LSC All-Defensive Team.

As a junior in 2020–21, Murray started in all 22 games and averaged a career-best 23.3 points, 6.2 rebounds and 4.2 assists per game. His 23.3 points per game set the third-highest single-season average in program history. He had 17 games with 20-plus points, including a career-high 37 points against Lubbock Christian. He won a third straight LSC tournament championship and was named to the LSC all-tournament team. The Buffaloes played in the 2021 NCAA Division II men's basketball tournament and reached their first ever title game, where they lost 80–54 to Northwest Missouri State. For the season, he earned first-team All-LSC and LSC All-Defensive Team honors. He helped the team win 51 of 55 games over the previous two seasons.

=== Long Beach State (2021–2023) ===
In April 2021, Murray transferred to Long Beach State with two remaining seasons of eligibility. He had been criticised for being too short and he had encountered coaches and people who doubted he could make the transition to Division I. He chose Long Beach State over Duquesne, Elon, Marshall, Sam Houston State, and Saint Mary's. He subsequently competed outside the state of Texas for the first time.

In the 2021–22 season, Murray started 30 games and led Long Beach State in scoring (16.7) and assists (2.8) on the year. He also averaged 3.0 rebounds per game. He recorded double figures in scoring in 26 games and 20 points or more in 12 games, finishing the season as the league's leading scorer over all games with 551 points. In his first two games, he had 28 points against Idaho and 30 points against UCLA. The team won the Big West Conference regular season championship after having an 11-game winning streak during the year. He was subsequently named first-team All-Big West as well as being the first All-District honoree for the Beach since Nick Faust in 2016, as Murray was named second-team All-District. The Beach went on to reach the final of the Big West tournament, where they lost 72–71 to Cal State Fullerton despite Murray's team-high 24 points. He was named in the all-tournament team.

Following the 2021–22 season, Murray received pre-draft workouts with NBA teams and initially declared for the 2022 NBA draft.

Murray returned to Long Beach State for the 2022–23 season, where he was the team's lone senior. He was chosen for the Preseason All-Big West team and was predicted by ESPN to be the Big West Conference's preseason player of the year. On January 7, 2023, he sustained a wrist injury against UC Irvine. He was subsequently ruled out for the rest of the season after requiring surgery. Despite not playing, he was praised by his teammates over the remainder of the season for his high IQ on the sidelines. Murray led the team in scoring at 15.7 points per game while also contributing 3.8 assists per game. He finished his collegiate career between Long Beach State and West Texas A&M with 2,418 points scored, 561 rebounds, 533 assists and 250 steals. He was also able to complete his major in civil engineering.

Murray was one-handed for 10 months while undergoing rehabilitation. He was subsequently unable to take part in any pre-draft workouts or the NBA Summer League and it denied him from signing with a European team. At the request of coach Dan Monson, Murray spent time with the Beach during the 2023–24 season.

== Professional career ==
=== Mandurah Magic (2024) ===
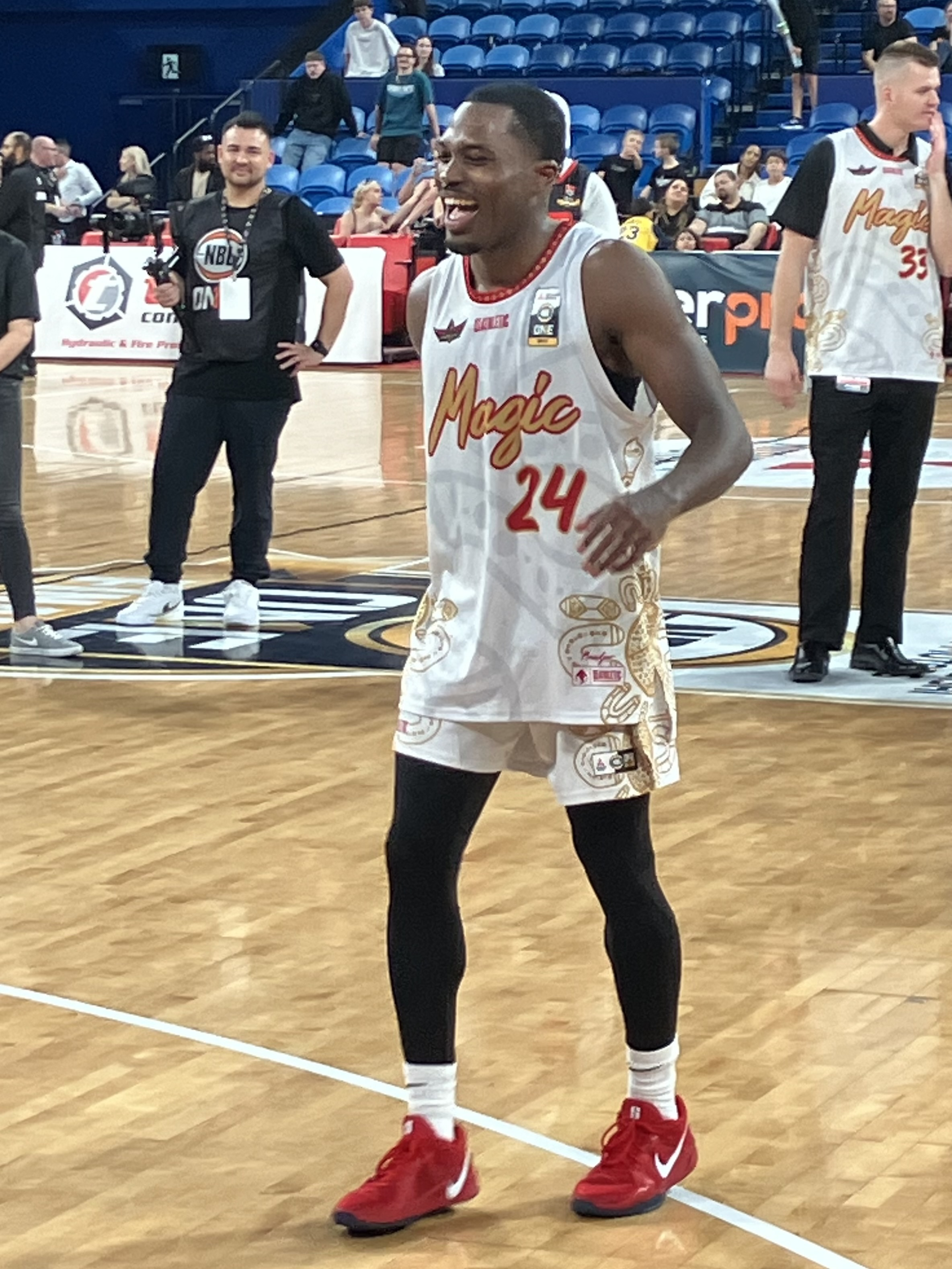
Murray with the Magic in August 2024 following the NBL1 West Grand Final

In early April 2024, Murray joined the Mandurah Magic of the NBL1 West for the 2024 season. He made his debut for the Magic three days after landing in Australia, marking his first game in 15 months. He was later named team captain. On May 11, he scored 42 points in a 107–94 win over the Goldfields Giants. On May 17, he scored 50 points in a 99–81 win over the Willetton Tigers. On June 15, he had 47 points, eight rebounds and nine assists in a 107–103 win over the Warwick Senators. On June 28, he scored 52 points in a 110–97 win over the Lakeside Lightning. On July 13, he scored 41 points in a 115–100 loss to the Geraldton Buccaneers. He helped the Magic finish the regular season in fourth place with a 13–9 record. His 34.3 points per game in the regular season led the entire NBL1 in scoring across all conferences. He was subsequently named the NBL1 West Most Valuable Player along with All-NBL1 West First Team honors and the Golden Hands Award. In the qualifying final, Murray scored 42 points before fouling out late in a 106–100 loss to the Buccaneers. In the semi-final, he had 34 points and 12 assists in a 110–93 win over the Giants. He led the Magic to the NBL1 West Grand Final with 40 points, 10 rebounds and nine assists in a 91–88 overtime win over the Joondalup Wolves in the preliminary final. In the grand final, he scored a team-high 30 points to lead the Magic to a 91–89 victory over the Willetton Tigers to win the NBL1 West championship. He was named grand final MVP after scoring nine points in the last two minutes of the game, including the go-ahead basket. He also finished with seven rebounds and three assists while playing all 40 minutes. In 23 games, he averaged 34.7 points, 4.91 rebounds, 7.35 assists and 2.43 steals per game.

At the 2024 NBL1 National Finals, Murray had 22 points, nine rebounds and eight assists in a 93–82 loss to the Mackay Meteors. He missed the Magic's second National Finals game after injuring his leg against the Meteors.

=== LWD Basket (2024–2025) ===
In July 2024, Murray signed with LWD Basket of the BNXT League in the Netherlands for the 2024–25 season. On November 9, he scored a game-high 26 points in a 79–73 win over BAL. On March 1, 2025, he recorded 29 points and 11 assists in an 86–77 win over Union Mons-Hainaut. Following this game, he was ruled out for a few weeks with a knee injury he sustained during training. He returned to action in mid April. He helped the team reach the Dutch playoffs, where they lost 3–2 in the semi-finals to ZZ Leiden. In game five, Murray scored 18 points in a 90–85 loss. In 32 games, he made five starts and averaged 15.1 points, 2.7 rebounds, 5.3 assists and 1.1 steals in 25.9 minutes per game.

=== Antwerp Giants (2025–present) ===
On July 4, 2025, Murray signed with Antwerp Giants in Belgium for the 2025–26 BNXT League. He was sidelined in January 2026 due to a hamstring injury. In March, he helped Antwerp win the 2025–26 Belgian Cup, scoring six points off the bench in the final in an 80–72 victory over Leuven Bears. He was listed as unavailable in April. In May, Antwerp clinched the BNXT League title by finishing the regular season on top of the ladder. In June, Murray helped Antwerp win the Belgian playoffs with a 3–2 finals series victory over BC Oostende. He recorded 12 points and five assists in the 89–84 overtime win in game five. In 32 games (13 starts), he averaged 10.4 points and 4.1 assists per game.

On June 24, 2026, Murray re-signed with Antwerp Giants for the 2026–27 BNXT League.

== Personal life ==
Murray's father, Joseph, played basketball at Alabama and played in the NBA with the Philadelphia 76ers. His older brother, JJ, played basketball at North Texas while his younger brother, Devin, also attended Rowlett High School.
