= Brad Robbins (basketball) =

Australian basketball player (born 1985)

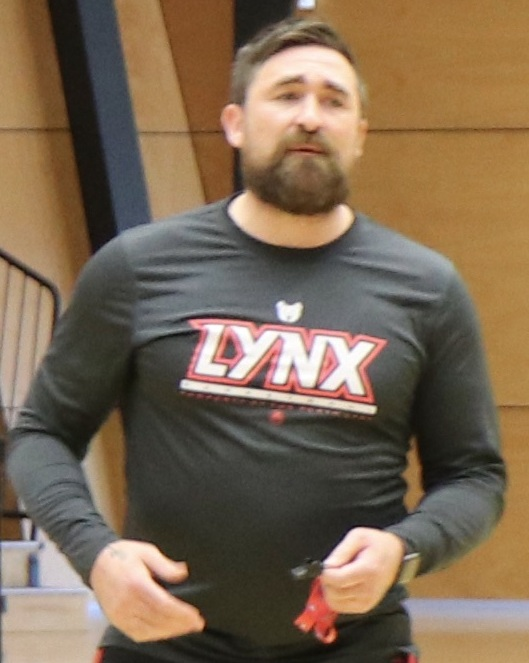
- Robbins with the Perth Lynx in 2021

Warwick Senators
- Title: Head coach
- League: NBL1 West

Personal information
- Born: 12 January 1985 (age 41) Melbourne, Victoria, Australia
- Listed height: 186 cm (6 ft 1 in)
- Listed weight: 102 kg (225 lb)

Career information
- Playing career: 2001–2019
- Position: Point guard
- Coaching career: 2017–present

Career history

Playing
- 2001: Dandenong Rangers
- 2003: Dandenong Rangers
- 2003–2004: Victoria Giants
- 2004–2005: Knox Raiders
- 2004–2005: Cairns Taipans
- 2006–2007: Willetton Tigers
- 2006–2013: Perth Wildcats
- 2011–2013: Wanneroo Wolves
- 2015: Joondalup Wolves
- 2019: Rockingham Flames

Coaching
- 2017–2018: Joondalup Wolves (assistant)
- 2021: Rockingham Flames (assistant)
- 2021–2024: Perth Lynx (assistant)
- 2024–present: Warwick Senators

Career highlights
- As player: NBL champion (2010); SBL champion (2011); 2× SEABL South YPOY (2004, 2005); As coach: NBL1 West champion (2026); NBL1 West Coach of the Year (2024)
Medals
Men's basketball
Representing Australia
FIBA U19 World Cup
Gold medal – first place	2003 Greece	Team

Bradley Dean Robbins (born 12 January 1985) is an Australian basketball coach and former player who is most known for his time spent in the National Basketball League (NBL) with the Perth Wildcats. He currently serves as the head coach of the Warwick Senators women's team in the NBL1 West.

== Early life and career ==
Born in Melbourne, Victoria, Robbins played his junior basketball at Dandenong. He represented Victoria in national competitions in Under 14s in 1998, Under 16s in 2000 and Under 18s in 2001 and 2002. In 2002, he represented Australia in junior men's teams and was then a member of the World Championship winning Australian Emus Under 19 team in 2003.

== Professional career ==
=== NBL ===
Robbins made his debut in the National Basketball League (NBL) with the Victoria Giants during the 2003–04 season. He scored 11 points in 13 games. For the 2004–05 season, he played for the Cairns Taipans and averaged 1.6 points and 1.1 rebounds in 25 games.

After not playing in the NBL in 2005–06, Robbins initially joined the Perth Wildcats as a development player for the 2006–07 season. He was elevated to a full roster sport in September 2006. He played 67 games in his first two seasons in Perth averaging 4.7 points, 2.2 rebounds, 1.2 steals and 1.9 assists a game, but was restricted to just three appearances in 2008–09 through injury.

In the 2009–10 season, Robbins formed a tremendous point guard duo with Damian Martin to help lead the Wildcats to the NBL championship and in 32 games he averaged 4.5 points, 2.3 rebounds, 2.1 assists and 1.1 steals a game. In the 2–1 grand final series win over the Wollongong Hawks, Robbins played through broken ribs, a calf tear and sore hips to drag Perth across the line. He was named co-captain of the Wildcats for the 2010–11 season and averaged 5.4 points, 2.3 rebounds, 2.1 assists and 1.1 steals a game. The 2011–12 season was his second as co-captain and he had career-high numbers right across the board with 7.0 points, 2.9 rebounds, 2.3 assists and 1.4 steals a game as the Wildcats lost in three games to the New Zealand Breakers in the grand final series.

Off-season wrist surgery forced Robbins to miss the first three weeks of the Wildcats' 2012–13 season, but upon returning to action, he managed just eight games before announcing his retirement from the NBL on 11 December 2012. He continued on with the team in an advisory role, but following an Achilles injury to Damian Martin in Game 2 of the Wildcats' semi-final series against the Wollongong Hawks, Robbins came out of retirement to fill in the back-up point guard role for the 2013 grand final series against the New Zealand Breakers. He played in both games of the Wildcats' 2–0 series loss to the Breakers, finishing his NBL career with 215 games and averages of 4.5 points, 2.1 rebounds and 1.7 assists per game.

Robbins revealed in January 2023 that a major depressive disorder was the reason for him retiring in 2012. He described his retirement press conference as a sham, telling the public his body had told him to retire when in fact other forces were the main factor.

=== SEABL and SBL ===
Robbins made his debut in the South East Australian Basketball League (SEABL) in 2001 with the Dandenong Rangers, playing one game. He was a regular member of the Rangers' squad in 2003 and played 21 games. In 2004 and 2005, he played for the Knox Raiders in the SEABL and won the Youth Player of the Year for the South Conference in both years.

In 2006 and 2007, Robbins played for the Willetton Tigers in the State Basketball League (SBL). Between 2011 and 2013, he played for the Wanneroo Wolves in the SBL and helped them win a championship in 2011 and reach another grand final in 2013. He did not play in 2014 but returned to the Wolves in 2015 for a short stint.

Robbins came out of retirement to play for the Rockingham Flames in the 2019 SBL season. He came into the season six kilograms lighter than he was when he was with the Wildcats, but a hamstring injury suffered during pre-season forced him to miss the start of the regular season. He made his debut for the Flames in round nine, but soon suffered a career-ending Achilles injury. In 12 games in his final playing stint, he averaged 5.25 points, 2.75 rebounds and 2.33 assists per game.

== Coaching career ==
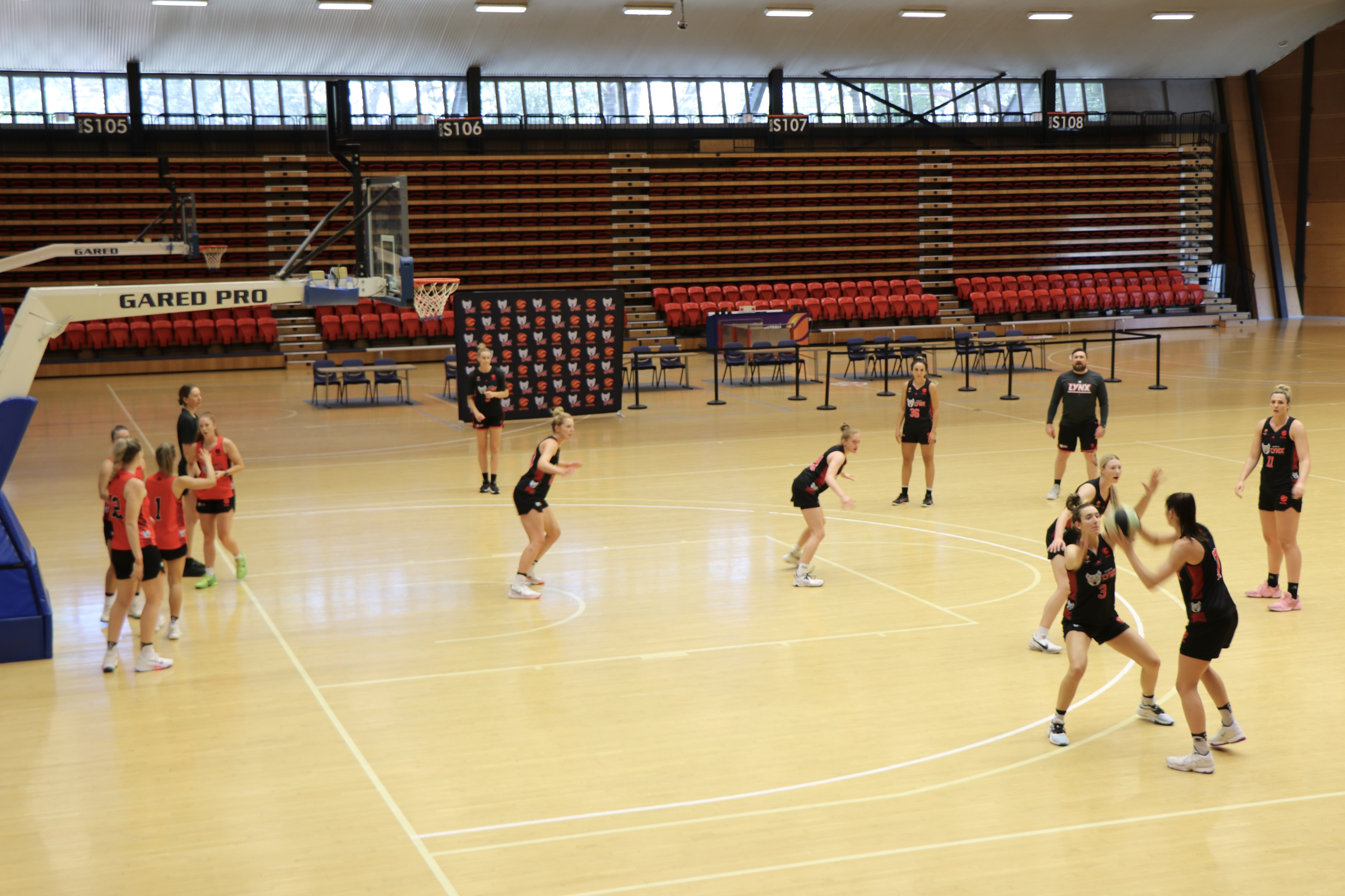
Robbins (back right) with the Lynx in December 2021

In 2017 and 2018, Robbins served as assistant coach for the Joondalup Wolves women's team in the SBL. He was interim head coach for a large chunk of the 2018 season with coach Craig Friday unavailable due to his duties with the national wheelchair team.

During the 2021 NBL1 West season, Robbins served as an assistant under Ryan Petrik with the Rockingham Flames men's team, helping them reach the grand final.

In July 2021, Robbins was appointed assistant coach of the Perth Lynx for the 2021–22 WNBL season. He continued as assistant in 2022–23 and 2023–24.

Robbins was appointed head coach of the Warwick Senators women's team in the NBL1 West for the 2024 season. He was named NBL1 West Coach of the Year. He was re-appointed as Senators women's head coach for the 2025 season. He guided the Senators to the 2025 NBL1 West Grand Final. He was re-appointed as Senators women's head coach for the 2026 season, with the team returning to the NBL1 West Grand Final. Robbins missed the 2026 grand final due to being in India with the Australian Emus, with assistant coach Paul Rogers guiding the Senators to the championship. Robbins went on to miss the 2026 NBL1 National Finals as well.

With the Australian Emus, Robbins served as an assistant coach at the 2026 FIBA U18 Asia Cup.

== Personal life ==
Robbins is married to wife Bekki and he has three children, Charlie, Donovan, and Bowie. He is the brother-in-law and close friend of former Wildcats and SBL teammate Greg Hire, with the pair having both married sisters.

In 2013, Robbins started working part-time as a project officer at the Fremantle Police and Community Youth Centre (PCYC). The centre's Streetball program, which Robbins began co-ordinating, was developed in 2012 to combat anti-social behaviour in the area. Robbins also began studying psychology and counselling at Edith Cowan University in 2013.

In January 2023, Robbins revealed to the public via The West Australian his long-time battle with depression and mental health issues since childhood which plagued him throughout his playing career.
