= Mikayla Pirini =

Australian basketball player

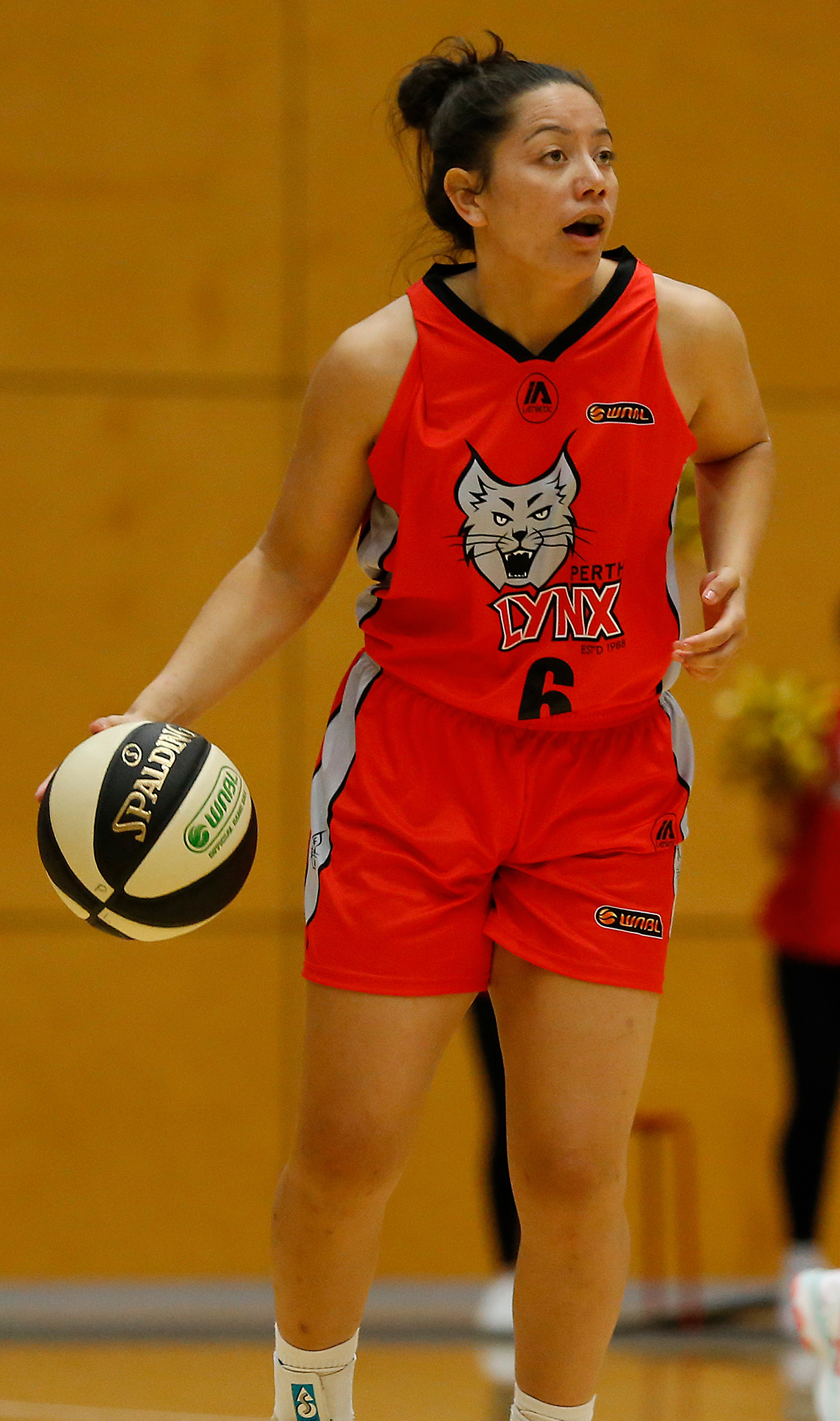
- Pirini with the Perth Lynx in 2017

No. 5 – Sydney Comets
- Position: Guard
- League: NBL1 East

Personal information
- Born: 29 June 1996 (age 30) Queenstown, New Zealand
- Listed height: 170 cm (5 ft 7 in)

Career information
- High school: Willetton (Perth, Western Australia)
- Playing career: 2012–present

Career history
- 2012–2014: Willetton Tigers
- 2013–2015: West Coast Waves
- 2015: BA Centre of Excellence
- 2015–2016: Adelaide Lightning
- 2016–2017: Diamond Valley Eagles
- 2017–2018: Perth Lynx
- 2018: Perth Redbacks
- 2018–2019: Adelaide Lightning
- 2019–2020: Joondalup Wolves
- 2021: Lakeside Lightning
- 2022–2024: Perth Redbacks
- 2025: Sydney Comets

Career highlights
- WCC champion (2020); NBL1 West Sixth Woman of the Year (2024)
Medals
Representing Australia
Basketball
FIBA U19 World Championship
Bronze medal – third place	2015 Russia	Team

Mikayla Dawn Pirini (born 29 June 1996) is an Australian and New Zealand professional basketball player.

== Early life ==
Pirini was born in Queenstown, New Zealand, but grew up in Perth, Western Australia. She attended Willetton Senior High School in Perth.

== Basketball career ==
=== WNBL ===
Pirini joined the West Coast Waves of the Women's National Basketball League (WNBL) for the 2013–14 season. She re-joined Waves for the 2014–15 season. She was used sparingly over two seasons as a development player.

For the 2015–16 WNBL season, Pirini joined the Adelaide Lightning.

For the 2017–18 WNBL season, Pirini joined the Perth Lynx, once again as a development player.

Pirini returned to the Adelaide Lightning for the 2018–19 WNBL season.

In September 2024, Pirini played for the Townsville Fire during the pre-season in the WNBL Hoopsfest in Perth, where she was named player of the game in one of her appearances, having 18 points and six rebounds.

=== State leagues ===
Pirini debuted for the Willetton Tigers of the State Basketball League (SBL) during the 2012 season. She continued with the Tigers in the 2013 SBL season and the 2014 SBL season.

In 2015, Pirini played for the BA Centre of Excellence in the South East Australian Basketball League (SEABL).

In 2016 and 2017, Pirini played for the Diamond Valley Eagles in the Big V, averaging 11.0 points and 3.6 assists in 2016 and 9.9 points and 3.8 assists in 2017.

Pirini joined the Perth Redbacks for the 2018 SBL season.

Pirini joined the Joondalup Wolves for the 2019 SBL season. She continued with the Wolves in 2020 in the West Coast Classic.

In 2021, Pirini joined the Lakeside Lightning, now in the NBL1 West, for the league's inaugural season.

For the 2022 NBL1 West season, Pirini re-joined the Perth Redbacks. She continued with the Redbacks in the 2023 NBL1 West season and the 2024 NBL1 West season. She was named the NBL1 West Sixth Woman of the Year for the 2024 season.

Pirini was set to join the Willetton Tigers for the 2025 NBL1 West season, but ultimately joined the Sydney Comets of the NBL1 East for the 2025 NBL1 season. She re-joined the Comets for the 2026 NBL1 East season.

=== National team ===
Pirini represented Australia at the 2013 Australian Youth Olympic Festival in 3x3 basketball. She played for Australia at the 2015 FIBA Under-19 World Championship in Russia, where she helped the team take home the bronze medal.
