= List of NBL1 West awards =

The NBL1 West presented 18 award categories (9 for the Men and 9 for the Women) to recognise its players and coaches for their accomplishments in the 2026 season. Between 1989 and 2019, the league was known as the State Basketball League (SBL).

The major awards each year are NBL1 West Most Valuable Player Award and NBL1 West Coach of the Year Award. During the SBL era, Most Improved Player and Rookie of the Year featured as prominent awards. In 2021, Defensive Player of the Year and Youth Player of the Year were included for the first time, followed by Sixth Man/Woman of the Year being introduced in 2022. Other major awards include All-NBL1 West First Team.

The only individual award of the postseason is the Grand Final MVP.

== Honours ==
Honor	Created	Description
All-NBL1 West First Team	2005	Two five-player teams, one for Men and one for Women, composed of the best players in the league following every NBL1 West season.
All-Defensive Team	2016	Two five-player teams, one for Men and one for Women, composed of the best defensive players in the league following every NBL1 West season.

== Individual awards ==
Award	Created	Description	Most recent winner(s)
Most Valuable Player	1989	Awarded to the best performing player of the regular season in both the Men's and Women's competitions.	M: Isaac White (Rockingham Flames); W: Jessie Edwards (Cockburn Cougars)
Grand Final MVP	1996	Awarded to the best performing player in both the Men's Grand Final and Women's Grand Final.	M: Isaac White (Rockingham Flames); W: Chloe Forster (Warwick Senators)
Coach of the Year	1989	Awarded to the best head coach of the regular season in both the Men's and Women's competitions.	M: Dayle Joseph (Geraldton Buccaneers); W: Jonelle Morley (East Perth Eagles)
Defensive Player of the Year	2021	Awarded to the best defensive player of the regular season in both the Men's and Women's competitions.	M: Josh Keyes (Geraldton Buccaneers); W: Jessie Edwards (Cockburn Cougars)
Youth Player of the Year	2021	Awarded to the best young player of the regular season in both the Men's and Women's competitions.	M: Marley Sam (Kalamunda Eastern Suns); W: Jayda Clark (Warwick Senators)
Sixth Man/Woman of the Year	2022	Awarded to the best reserve player of the regular season in both the Men's and Women's competitions.	M: Ryan Godfrey (Rockingham Flames); W: Darcee Garbin (Cockburn Cougars)
Leading Scorer	2021	Awarded to the player with highest points per game tally of the regular season in both the Men's and Women's competitions.	M: Jack Browder (Perry Lakes Hawks); W: Makenna Marisa (Perry Lakes Hawks)
Leading Rebounder	2021	Awarded to the player with highest rebounds per game tally of the regular season in both the Men's and Women's competitions.	M: Josh Davey (Lakeside Lightning); W: Trisa Hull (Kalamunda Eastern Suns)
Golden Hands	2021	Awarded to the player with best assists plus steals to turnover ratio in both the Men's and Women's competitions.	M: Emmett Naar (Rockingham Flames); W: Mikayla Pivec (Mandurah Magic)
