= Rainbow Coast Raiders =

- Leagues: State Basketball League
- Founded: 1989
- Dissolved: 1999
- History: Men: Rainbow Coast Raiders; 1989–1995; Albany Raiders; 1996–1997; Great Southern Raiders; 1998; Rainbow Coast Raiders; 1999; Women: Rainbow Coast Raiders; 1992–1994
- Arena: Albany Sports Centre
- Location: Albany, Western Australia
- Team colors: 1989–1997; White, green, yellow/gold 1998–1999; White, purple, black
- Championships: 0

Rainbow Coast Raiders was a State Basketball League (SBL) club based in Albany, Western Australia. The club fielded a team in both the Men's SBL and Women's SBL. The Raiders played their home games at Albany Sports Centre.

== Club history ==
1989 saw the formation of the State Basketball League (SBL) with both a men's and women's competition. A team from Albany, known as the Raiders, entered the Men's SBL for its inaugural season. They were the first team outside of Perth to enter the SBL and represented the Rainbow Coast and Great Southern region.

The Raiders missed the finals in their first three seasons before making the top eight for the first time in 1992, finishing seventh with a 12–12 record and losing 2–0 in the quarter-finals to the Cockburn Cougars. The 1993 season marked the Raiders' best ever season, as they finished third with a 17–7 record and defeated the Willetton Tigers 2–1 in the quarter-finals. They went on to lose 2–1 to the Wanneroo Wolves in the semi-finals.

In 1992, a Raiders women's team entered the Women's SBL for the first time. In three seasons, the team had three wins and 57 losses.

The Raiders men did not play finals again from 1994 onwards and folded following the 1999 season due to financial constraints. The club attempted to re-enter the SBL for the 2001 season but their application was unsuccessful, with the league stating that the Raiders were "not quite ready".

In 2009 and 2011, a regular season SBL game was played at the Albany Leisure and Aquatic Centre. Over the next few years, attempts were made by Albany Basketball Association to submit bids and applications for a return of the Raiders to the SBL. In 2025, a regular season NBL1 West game was played at the Albany Leisure and Aquatic Centre.

== Season-by-season results ==
Men's team
Year	Won	Lost	Pos	Titles
1989	5	17	10th	
1990	11	15	10th	
1991	12	14	9th	
1992	12	12	7th	
1993	17	7	3rd	
1994	9	17	12th	
1995	8	18	11th	
1996	6	20	12th	
1997	7	17	11th	
1998	4	20	13th	Wooden spoon
1999	9	17	11th	

Women's team
Year	Won	Lost	Pos	Titles
1992	0	20	11th	Wooden spoon
1993	2	18	10th	
1994	1	19	11th	Wooden spoon
