= Michael Vigor =

Scottish-born Australian basketball player

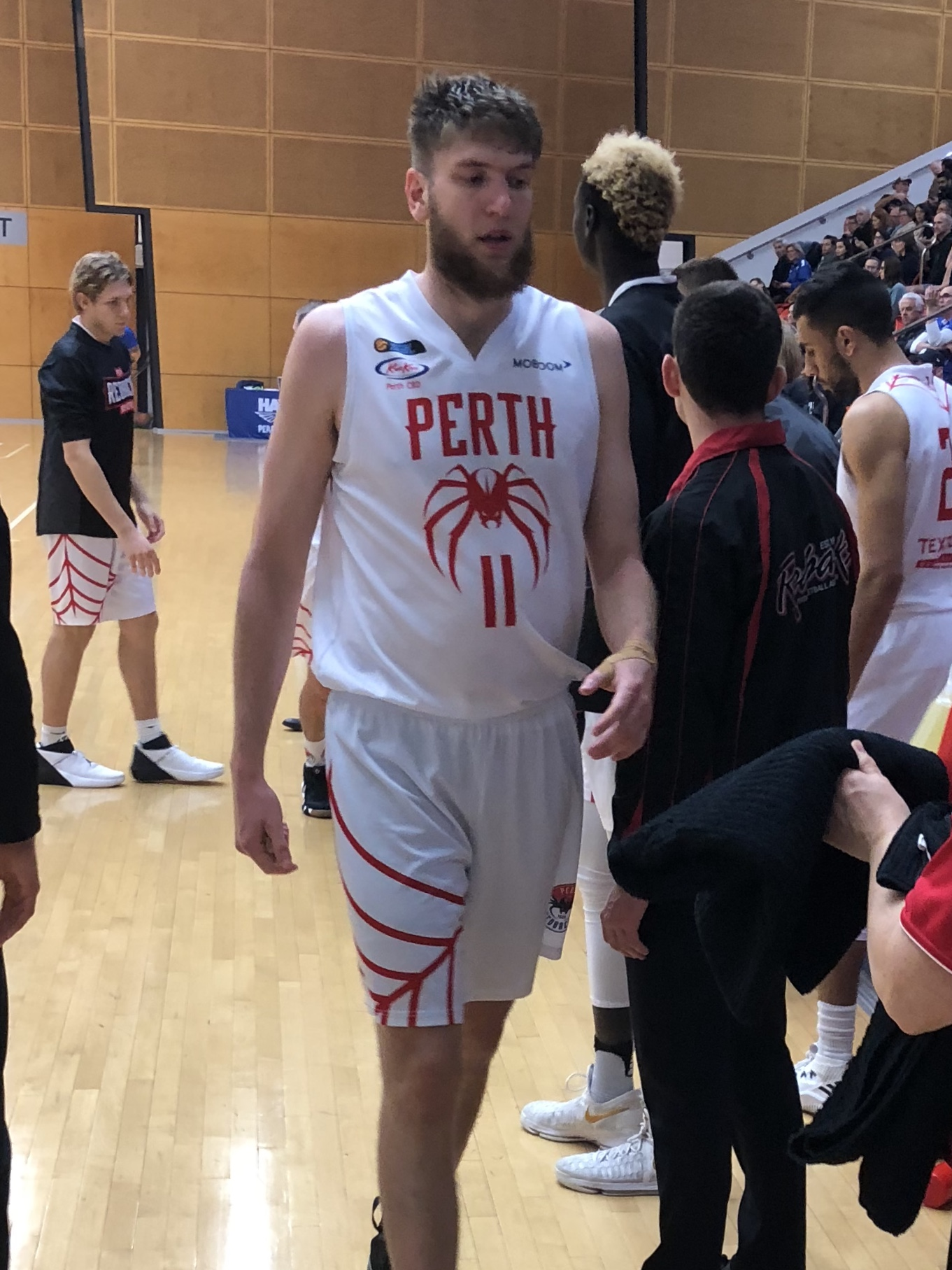
- Vigor with the Perth Redbacks in 2018

No. 0 – Willetton Tigers
- Position: Power forward / Centre
- League: NBL1 West

Personal information
- Born: 17 September 1990 (age 36) Westhill, Scotland
- Listed height: 206 cm (6 ft 9 in)
- Listed weight: 98 kg (216 lb)

Career information
- High school: Wesley College (Perth, Western Australia)
- Playing career: 2008–present

Career history
- 2008–2013: Perth Redbacks
- 2011–2014: Perth Wildcats
- 2014–2015: Bendigo Braves
- 2015–2016: Plymouth Raiders
- 2016–2018: Perth Redbacks
- 2016–2019: Bristol Flyers
- 2019–2020: Lakeside Lightning
- 2019–2020: Libertas Altamura
- 2021–present: Willetton Tigers

Career highlights
- NBL champion (2014); SBL champion (2017); SBL Most Improved Player (2012)

Michael James Vigor (born 17 September 1990) is a Scottish-born Australian professional basketball player for the Willetton Tigers of the NBL1 West. He made his debut in the State Basketball League (SBL) for the Perth Redbacks in 2008 and in 2011 joined the Perth Wildcats of the National Basketball League (NBL) as a development player. He won an NBL championship with the Wildcats in 2014 and an SBL championship with the Redbacks in 2017. He played in Europe between 2015 and 2020, and in 2018 he represented Scotland at the Commonwealth Games.

== Early life ==
Vigor was born in Westhill, Scotland, to an English father and a Scottish mother. He lived there for the first five years of his life before being raised in Australia. Vigor attended Wesley College in Perth, Western Australia, where he played for the school's basketball team. He also played in the Western Australian Basketball League (WABL) for the Perth Redbacks as a junior.

== Professional career ==
=== SBL, SEABL and NBL1 ===
Vigor debuted in the State Basketball League (SBL) for the Perth Redbacks in 2008. He continued with the Redbacks until 2013. In 2012, he won the SBL Most Improved Player Award.

In 2014 and 2015, Vigor played for the Bendigo Braves in the South East Australian Basketball League (SEABL).

Vigor re-joined the Redbacks in 2016 and was named the team MVP. In 2017, he helped the Redbacks win the SBL championship. He played his ninth season with the Redbacks in 2018.

In 2019, Vigor joined the Lakeside Lightning in the SBL. He continued with the Lightning in 2020 in the West Coast Classic.

In 2021, Vigor joined the Willetton Tigers for the inaugural NBL1 West season. In 19 games, he averaged 16.26 points, 10.57 rebounds, 3.15 assists and 1.15 steals per game. He re-joined the Tigers in 2022 and averaged 11.7 points, 6.7 rebounds and 4.1 assists in 19 games. He re-joined the Tigers for the 2023 NBL1 West season and averaged 9.23 points, 6.0 rebounds and 3.45 assists in 22 games.

Vigor re-joined the Tigers for the 2024 NBL1 West season. He suffered a late season calf injury but returned to play his 300th SBL/NBL1 game in July 2024. He helped the Tigers reach the NBL1 West grand final, where they lost 91–89 to the Mandurah Magic. Vigor had six points, eight rebounds and 11 assists.

Vigor re-joined the Tigers for the 2025 NBL1 West season. He re-joined the Tigers for the 2026 NBL1 West season.

=== NBL and Europe ===
Vigor was a development player for the Perth Wildcats of the National Basketball League (NBL) between 2011 and 2014. He was a member of the Wildcats' championship-winning team in the 2013–14 season.

In July 2015, Vigor signed with the Plymouth Raiders of the British Basketball League for the 2015–16 season. In 32 games, he averaged 11.5 points per game on 33% shooting from behind the three-point-line.

On 29 June 2016, Vigor signed with the Bristol Flyers for the 2016–17 season. In 33 games, he averaged 9.8 points and 6.6 rebounds per game.

On 31 May 2017, Vigor re-signed with the Flyers and joined the team as captain for the 2017–18 season. In 32 games, he averaged 8.4 points, 6.3 rebounds and 2.9 assists per game.

In December 2018, Vigor re-joined the Flyers for the rest of the 2018–19 season. In 15 games, he averaged 6.5 points, 4.0 rebounds and 2.3 assists per game.

Vigor played in Italy in the 2019–20 season, averaging 16.1 points in 18 games for Libertas Altamura in the Lega Basket Serie C.

== National team career ==
In January 2018, Vigor received his first international call-up for Scotland ahead of the 2018 Commonwealth Games on the Gold Coast. He qualified to play for Scotland through his mother's Scottish heritage. He helped Scotland reach the bronze medal game at the Commonwealth Games, as they finished the tournament in fourth place.

== Personal life ==
Vigor married his wife Jadie in 2022. The couple had their first child in 2025.

As of August 2025, Vigor worked as a full-time coach with Redhage Basketball alongside former teammate at the Wildcats and Redbacks, Shawn Redhage.
