= Fiona Robinson (sportswoman) =

Australian basketball and handball player

Personal information
- Born: 7 February 1969 (age 57) Perth, Western Australia, Australia
- Listed height: 190 cm (6 ft 3 in)
- Listed weight: 75 kg (165 lb)

Career information
- College: Texas State (1988–1989)
- Playing career: 1985–2004
- Position: Power forward / Centre

Career history
- 1985–1987: Australian Institute of Sport
- 1988: Perth Breakers
- 1990–1994: Stirling Senators
- 1991; 1993–1995: Perth Breakers
- 1996–1997: Canberra Capitals
- 1996–1997: Pool Getafe
- 1997–1998: Gustino Schnitzelpl
- 2003–2004: Frankston Blues

Career highlights
- ABA National champion (2004); SEABL champion (2004); SBL champion (1994); 2× SBL Most Valuable Player (1990, 1992)
Medals
Women's Basketball
Representing Australia
Olympic Games
Bronze medal – third place	1996 Atlanta	Team competition

Fiona Mary Robinson (also known as Fiona Hannan; born 7 February 1969) is an Australian-British former basketball and handball player who won a bronze medal with the Australia women's national basketball team at the 1996 Atlanta Olympics and later competed for the Australia women's national handball team at the 2000 Sydney Olympics.

As a basketball player, Robinson played 10 seasons in the Women's National Basketball League (WNBL) and five seasons in the State Basketball League (SBL).

== Early life ==
Robinson was born in Perth, Western Australia.

== Basketball career ==
Robinson was a state representative for Western Australia as a junior before accepting a scholarship to attend the Australian Institute of Sport (AIS) from 1985 to 1987. During those three years, she played for the AIS women's team in the Women's National Basketball League (WNBL).

In 1988, Robinson debuted for the Perth Breakers in the WNBL, playing nine games. She then moved to the United States after accepting a scholarship to attend Southwest Texas State University. She played for the Texas State Bobcats in the 1988–89 season, averaging 7.8 rebounds per game.

Robinson next played in the WNBL in 1991, re-joining the Perth Breakers, where she finished third in the league in rebounding with 10.4 rebounds per game. After sitting out the 1992 WNBL season, she continued with the Breakers in 1993, 1994 and 1995. In 1996 and 1997, she played for the Canberra Capitals.

Between 1990 and 1994, Robinson played for the Stirling Senators in the State Basketball League (SBL). She was named SBL Most Valuable Player in 1990 and 1992, and helped the Senators win the SBL championship in 1994. She had a 55-point game for the Senators in 1992, and a 60-point game in 1994. In 85 games over five SBL seasons, she scored 2,062 points for an average of 24.3 per game.

In the 1996–97 season, Robinson played for Spanish team Pool Getafe in the EuroLeague. In the 1997–98 season, she played for Austrian team Gustino Schnitzelpl in the Ronchetti Cup.

In 2003 and 2004, Robinson played for the Frankston Blues in the South East Australian Basketball League (SEABL), where she won an ABA national championship.

In July 2023, Robinson was inducted into the Basketball WA Hall of Fame.

=== National team ===
Robinson was selected as an Australian team member for the 1987 Summer Universiade in Zagreb.

Robinson played for the Australia women's national basketball team that won the bronze medal at the 1996 Summer Olympics.

=== Coaching ===
In 2026, Robinson served as an assistant coach with the Perth Redbacks men's team in the NBL1 West. She also served as head coach of the Curtin University women's team in the 2026 University Basketball League (UBL) season.

== Handball career ==
After moving to Europe in the late 1990s, Robinson switched sports and began playing handball. She went on to play for the Australia women's national handball team at the 2000 Summer Olympics.

== Personal life ==
For a period in the early 1990s, Robinson was known as Fiona Massara. Her surname returned to Robinson in the mid-1990s, later changing again to Fiona Hannan after marrying Andy Hannan. The two met in Canberra while she was playing for the Capitals and Andy was at the Australian Defence Force Academy. Their daughter, Ashlee Hannan, was inline to play college basketball in the United States for the University of Texas in 2019–20 but she never debuted. Ashlee joined the Perth Lynx in 2023.

Robinson holds dual nationality with Australia and England.
