= Brad Robbins =

Brad Robbins may refer to:

- Brad Robbins (American football) (born 1998), American football player
- Brad Robbins (basketball) (born 1985), Australian former basketball player
