= Swan City Mustangs =

- Leagues: State Basketball League
- Founded: 1989
- Dissolved: 2003
- History: Swan City Mustangs; 1989–1996; 1999–2003
- Arena: Swan Park Leisure Centre
- Location: Midvale, Western Australia
- Team colors: Black, white, red
- Championships: 4
- Website: SwansBasketball.com

Swan City Mustangs was a State Basketball League (SBL) club based in Perth, Western Australia. The club fielded a team in both the Men's SBL (MSBL) and Women's SBL (WSBL). The club was a division of the now-defunct Swan Districts Basketball Association (SDBA), an administrative basketball organisation in the City of Swan. The Mustangs played their home games at Swan Park Leisure Centre.

== Club history ==
=== Background ===
Swan Districts Basketball Association (SDBA) was founded in 1964. Swans entered the District Competition in 1974, with the men's team winning the grand final that year under coach Bob Muir. The association's next A-grade premiership came in 1982 when the women's team were victorious under coach Fred Pesqua. The women's team won again in 1983, while the men's team won their second A-grade premiership in 1985. Swan Districts did not play in 1987 and 1988.

=== SBL ===
1989 saw the formation of the State Basketball League (SBL) with both a men's and women's competition. Swan Districts entered a team into both the MSBL and WSBL, with both teams recording winless inaugural seasons.

In 1990, the Mustangs women recorded one win, while the men earned the MSBL minor premiership with a first-place finish and a 23–3 record. In 1991, both teams collected minor premierships and earned grand final berths. In the WSBL Grand Final, the Mustangs defeated the Perth Redbacks 79–66; and in the MSBL Grand Final, the Mustangs defeated the Souwest Slammers 123–120.

In 1992, the women won their second straight minor premiership and again reached the WSBL Grand Final, where they lost 74–64 to the Wanneroo Wolves. In 1993, the women won their third straight minor premiership and again reached the WSBL Grand Final, where they defeated the Stirling Senators 109–51 to win their second championship. In 1994, the women won their fourth straight minor premiership while the men reached their second MSBL Grand Final, where they were defeated by the Perry Lakes Hawks 107–86.

In 1995, the women returned to the WSBL Grand Final, where they lost 2–0 in the best-of-three series to the Wanneroo Wolves. In 1996, the women collected their fifth minor premiership in six years and advanced through to their fifth grand final in six years. In the 1996 WSBL Grand Final, the Mustangs defeated the Willetton Tigers 66–61 to win their third championship.

In 1999, the Mustangs returned to the SBL after a two-year hiatus where the Association sought to re-build the programme through juniors and local players. The women's team finished last on the ladder four straight years between 1999 and 2002, winning just one game. The men's team finished last or second last in each of those years as well. In 2002, men's captain Jarrad Mohr was named joint Men's SBL MVP alongside Kurt Slabolepszy of the Stirling Senators. Mohr joined Ken Epperson (1993) as the only Mustangs players to earn MVP honours. In 2003, the women had a 6–10 record while the men had an 11–8 record.

SDBA at this time was in financial difficulty with increasing debt in excess of $40,000 to Basketball Western Australia. Following the 2003 season, the Swan City Mustangs SBL club and the Association ceased to operate.

== Season-by-season results ==
Men's team
Year	Won	Lost	Pos	Titles
1989	0	22	12th	Wooden spoon
1990	23	3	1st	Minor premiership
1991	22	4	1st	Minor premiership MSBL Championship
1992	16	8	5th	
1993	16	8	4th	
1994	20	6	2nd	MSBL Grand Finalist
1995	9	17	10th	
1996	7	19	11th	
1997	DNP			
1998	DNP			
1999	5	21	13th	
2000	5	14	6th (West)	
2001	2	24	14th	Wooden spoon
2002	4	22	13th	
2003	11	8	3rd (North)	

Women's team
Year	Won	Lost	Pos	Titles
1989	0	21	8th	Wooden spoon
1990	1	20	8th	Wooden spoon
1991	16	5	1st	Minor premiership WSBL Championship
1992	18	2	1st	Minor premiership WSBL Grand Finalist
1993	18	2	1st	Minor premiership WSBL Championship
1994	16	4	1st	Minor premiership
1995	18	6	2nd	WSBL Grand Finalist
1996	21	3	1st	Minor premiership WSBL Championship
1997	DNP			
1998	DNP			
1999	1	26	10th	Wooden spoon
2000	0	20	11th	Wooden spoon
2001	0	22	12th	Wooden spoon
2002	0	22	12th	Wooden spoon
2003	6	10	4th (North)	
