= Rockingham Flames =

- Leagues: NBL1 West
- Founded: 1992
- History: Men: Rockingham Flames; 1994–present Women: Rockingham Flames; 1992–present
- Arena: Mike Barnett Sports Complex
- Location: Rockingham, Western Australia
- Team colors: Red, black, white
- President: Jo Clossick
- Vice-president: Karina Tudor
- General manager: Frank Fimmano
- Head coach: M: Ryan Petrik; W: David Morrell
- Championships: 6
- Website: NBL1.com.au

Rockingham Flames is an NBL1 West club based in Perth, Western Australia. The club fields a team in both the Men's and Women's NBL1 West. The club is a division of the Rockingham Basketball and Recreation Association (RBRA), the major administrative basketball organisation in the region. The Flames play their home games at Mike Barnett Sports Complex.

== Club history ==
In the early 1970s, Rockingham and Districts Basketball Association was established.

The Rockingham Flames made their debut in the State Basketball League (SBL) in 1992 in the form of a women's team, becoming the first club to introduce a women's program before a men's program. In 1994, a Rockingham Flames men's team entered the Men's SBL. The club saw little success over their first 20 seasons in the SBL, with neither the women or the men winning a minor premiership or earning a grand final berth.

In 2012, the Flames women made history for the club by reaching their first ever grand final, where they lost 85–48 to the South West Slammers.

Between 2013 and 2016, the Flames had a successful four-year run with women's import Sami Whitcomb and men's import Cooper Land. The pair both won multiple SBL MVPs, while Whitcomb led the Flames to two championships.

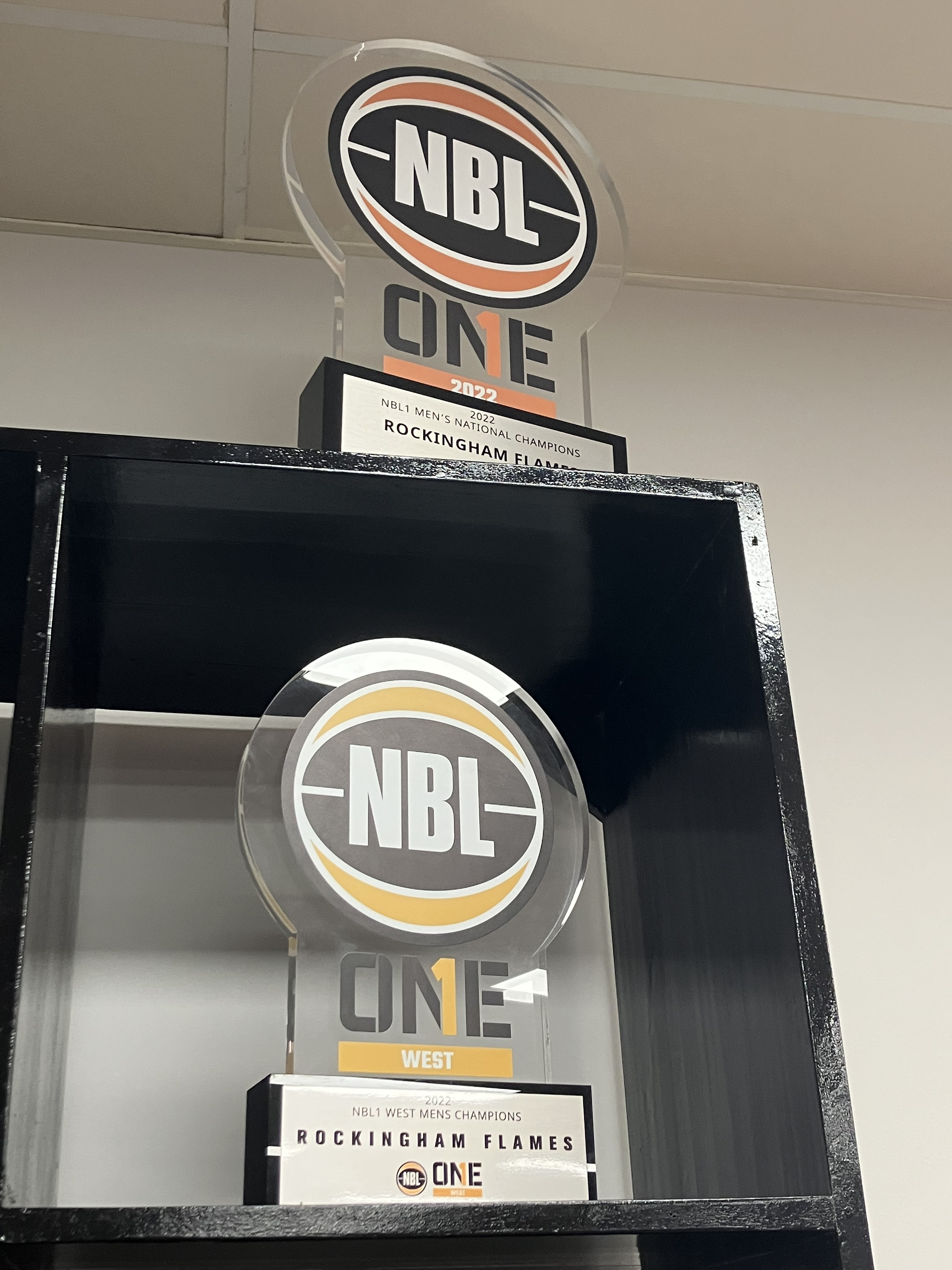
NBL1 Championship Trophies, National (top) and West (bottom), won by the Flames men in 2022

In 2014, the women collected the club's first-ever minor premiership with a first-place finish and a 20–2 record. They went undefeated over the first two rounds of the finals to reach their second grand final, where they defeated the Lakeside Lightning 80–75 to claim their maiden WSBL championship.

In 2015, the women finished as minor premiers for the second straight year, once again with a 20–2 record. They made their way through to their third WSBL Grand Final in four years after going undefeated over the first two rounds of the finals. In the grand final, they defeated the Willetton Tigers 68–63 to claim back-to-back titles.

In 2019, the Flames women finished the regular season in seventh position with a 13–9 record before reaching the WSBL Grand Final after going undefeated over the first two rounds of the finals. In the grand final, the Flames defeated the Warwick Senators 85–56 to win their third WSBL championship.

In 2021, the SBL was rebranded as NBL1 West. The Flames men went on to reach the NBL1 West Grand Final to mark their first grand final appearance in their history, where they were defeated 92–82 by the Perry Lakes Hawks.

In 2022, the Flames men reached their second straight grand final, where they defeated the Geraldton Buccaneers 91–79 to win their maiden championship. At the 2022 NBL1 National Finals, the team was crowned national champions with an 85–74 win over the Frankston Blues in the championship game.

In 2023, the Flames men finished the regular season in first place with a 19–3 record to win their first ever minor premiership. They went on to lose to the Joondalup Wolves in the preliminary final. At the 2023 NBL1 National Finals, the team reached the championship game where they lost 90–85 to the Knox Raiders.

In 2024, the Flames women finished the regular season in first place with an 18–2 record and went on to reach the NBL1 West grand final. In the grand final, the Flames defeated the Cockburn Cougars 97–81 to win their fourth title. They went on a 21–2 run in the last five minutes to overrun the Cougars, including scoring 19 consecutive points.

In 2025, the Flames men finished the regular season in first place with a 19–3 record. They went on to lose to the Warwick Senators in the preliminary final.

In 2026, the Flames men reached the NBL1 West Grand Final, where they defeated the Geraldton Buccaneers 66–62 to win their second championship.

== Accolades ==
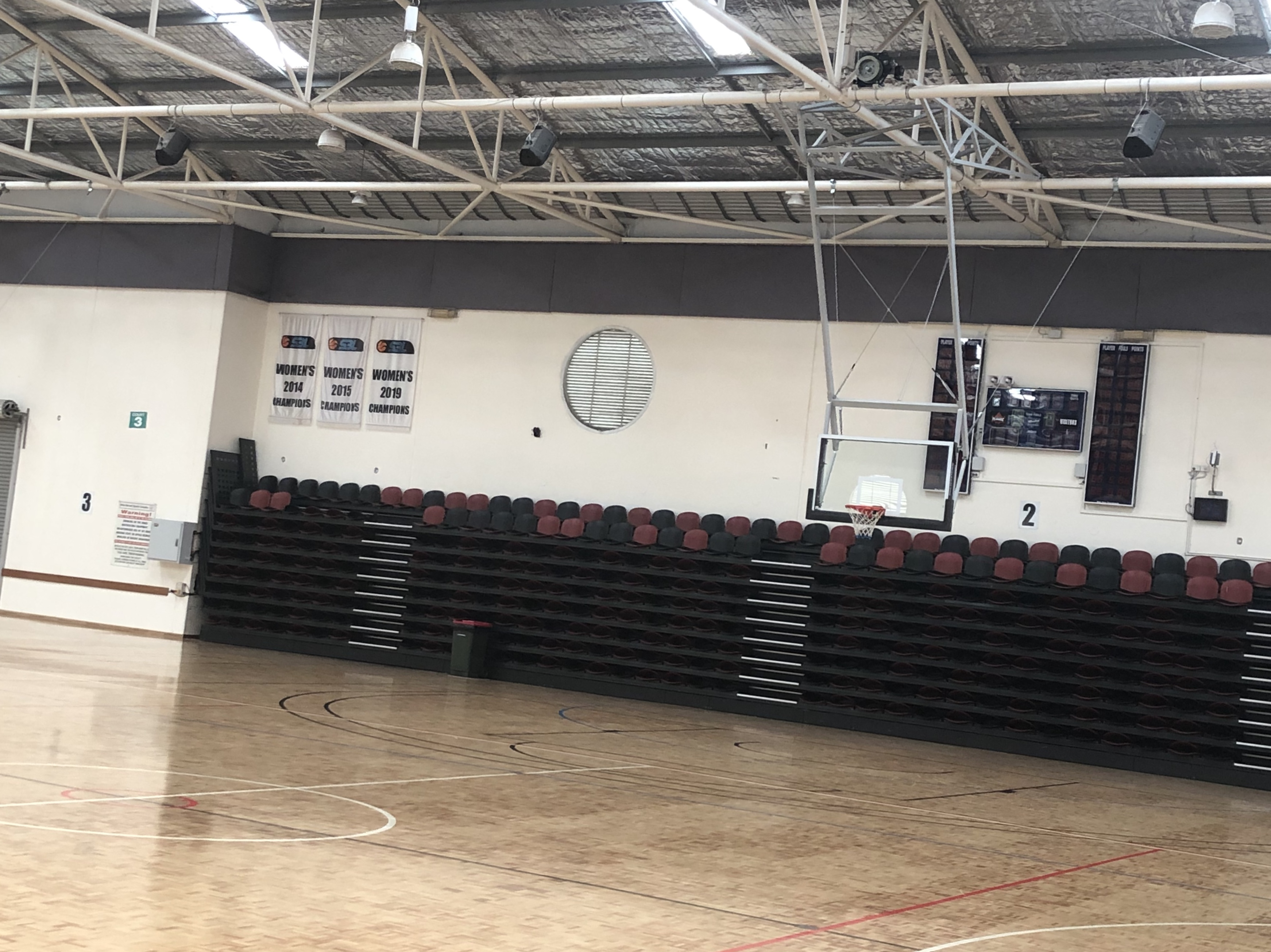
The Flames' three SBL championship banners hanging on the wall at Mike Barnett Sports Complex, July 2020

Women

- Championships: 4 (2014, 2015, 2019, 2024)
- Grand Final appearances: 5 (2012, 2014, 2015, 2019, 2024)
- Minor premierships: 3 (2014, 2015, 2024)

Men

- Championships: 2 (2022, 2026)
- Grand Final appearances: 3 (2021, 2022, 2026)
- Minor premierships: 2 (2023, 2025)
