= Goldfields Basketball Stadium =

Sports venue in Kalgoorlie, Western Australia

- Interactive map of Goldfields Basketball Stadium
- Former names: Niels Hansen Basketball Stadium
- Location: Brookman Street, Kalgoorlie, Western Australia
- Coordinates: 30°44′31″S 121°28′32″E
- Capacity: 1,200 (old show court); 1,000 (new show court)

Construction
- Opened: 1979

Tenants
- Goldfields Basketball Association (1979–present); Goldfields Giants (NBL1 West) (1990–present)

Goldfields Basketball Stadium (also known by its sponsored name, the Evolution Mining Stadium) is a multi-sports basketball stadium and events centre located in Kalgoorlie, Western Australia. It is the home of (and managed by) the Goldfields Basketball Association, and is also the home venue of the Goldfields Giants of the NBL1 West.

The stadium was originally called the Niels Hansen Basketball Stadium, and was named after local Goldfields basketball stalwart, Niels Hansen. He became the fifth life member of Kalgoorlie-Boulder Basketball Association in 1980. He died in 2012, aged 83.

== History ==
The stadium was built in 1979 and was renovated in the late 1990s. In 2018, planning for an expansion of the stadium began. In 2022, it was confirmed that two new courts would be added to the existing three at the facility. In July 2024, the Goldfields Giants played their final home game on the traditional main court before switching to a brand-new show court in 2025.

In January 2025, the official opening of the $14.8 million stadium redevelopment took place, with the facility unveiled by WA Premier Roger Cook as the Goldfields Basketball Stadium. In February 2025, the Kalgoorlie-Boulder Basketball Association underwent a name change to Goldfields Basketball Association to better align with the Goldfields Giants brand.

In August 2025, the stadium was officially named Evolution Mining Stadium under a naming rights partnership between the Goldfields Basketball Association and Evolution Mining. The original three-court section of the stadium retained the Niels Hansen name.

== Notable games ==
On 23 February 2004, the stadium played host to the Perth Wildcats in an official National Basketball League regular season game against the Hunter Pirates.

The stadium also hosted an official Women's National Basketball League regular season game featuring the Perth Lynx in February 2009.
