= Warwick Stadium =

Multi sport venue in Perth, Western Australia

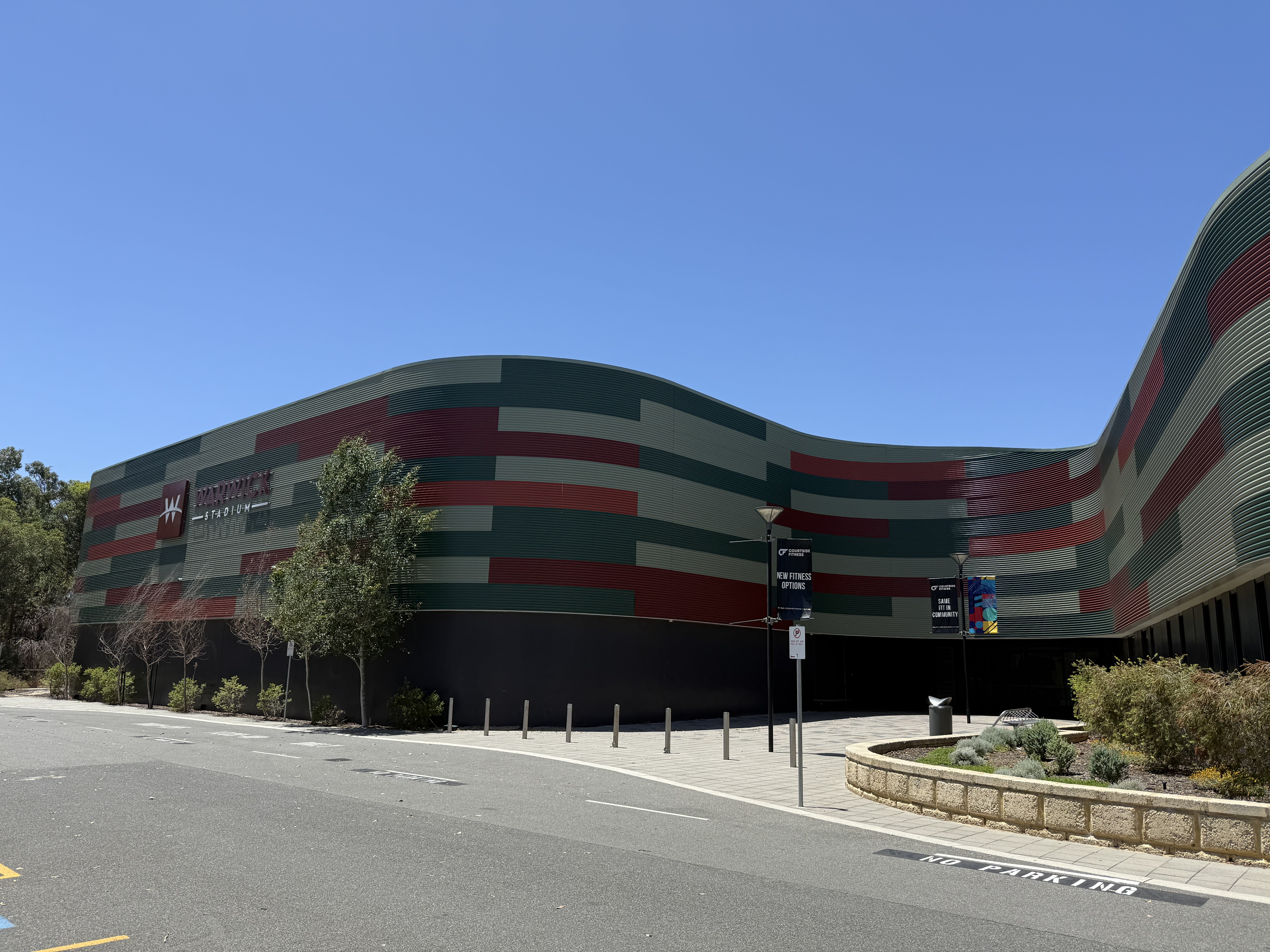
- Main entrance, January 2025
- Interactive map of Warwick Stadium
- Former names: Warwick Leisure Centre (1992–2015)
- Location: Corner Warwick & Wanneroo Roads, Warwick, Western Australia
- Coordinates: 31.834°S 115.820°E
- Owner: Churches of Christ Sport & Recreation Association
- Operator: Churches of Christ Sport & Recreation Association

Construction
- Opened: 1992

Tenant
- Warwick Senators

Warwick Stadium is a multi-purpose stadium located in Perth, Western Australia, catering primarily for basketball.

The stadium features eight multi-sport courts with basketball, netball and volleyball capabilities. The stadium also holds gym and fitness facilities.

The stadium is the home of the Warwick Senators in the NBL1 West.

== History ==
In 1992, the Warwick Leisure Centre was built in the Perth suburb of Warwick. In 2015, the venue received an $8 million expansion, with the Churches of Christ Sport & Recreation Association (CCSRA) investing over $5.5 million and the City of Joondalup committing $2.3 million. The expansion included four new indoor courts to bring the total to eight. The venue was subsequently renamed Warwick Stadium. The renovations were completed in time for the start of the 2016 State Basketball League season.

In January 2025, the WA Labor government committed $16 million for a new high performance venue at Warwick Stadium. The planned expansion includes three new courts and gym facilities to cater for elite operations of Perth's national basketball teams, the Perth Wildcats and Perth Lynx, with both clubs pledging to move their bases from the WA Basketball Centre to Warwick Stadium. Bipartisan support was confirmed the following month, with the WA Liberal Party matching the $16 million pledge. By February 2026, the planning progress had stalled amid a breakdown in communications and funding fears from the City of Joondalup.
