= NBL1 West =

Australian semi-professional basketball league

- Most recent season or competition: 2026 NBL1 West season
- Formerly: State Basketball League; 1989–2020
- Sport: Basketball
- Founded: 1989
- First season: 1989
- No. of teams: W: 14; M: 14
- Country: Australia
- Continent: FIBA Oceania (Oceania)
- Most recent champions: W: Warwick Senators (3rd title); M: Rockingham Flames (2nd title)
- Most titles: W: Willetton Tigers (9 titles); M: Perry Lakes Hawks (7 titles)
- Website: NBL1.com.au/West

NBL1 West, formerly the State Basketball League (SBL), is a semi-professional basketball league in Western Australia, comprising both a men's and women's competition. In 2020, Basketball Western Australia partnered with the National Basketball League (NBL) to bring NBL1 to Western Australia. NBL1 replaced the former SBL to create more professional pathways and opportunities for males and females playing basketball in Western Australia. As a result, the SBL became the west conference of NBL1.

== History ==
The State Basketball League originated in 1972 as the District Competition. The District Competition was introduced by the Western Australian Basketball Federation (WABF) as an 'elite' competition held on Friday nights, featuring eight Perth-based associations from the prominent districts of Perth, Swan Districts, Tangney/Willetton, Subiaco, East Perth, Cockburn, Stirling, and Claremont.

In 1987, plans were put in place to expand the competition and include several country teams. In 1988, it was decided to form a State Basketball League for both men and women, and in 1989 the SBL made its debut season with three new franchises established in country areas: Rainbow Coast Raiders from Albany, Batavia Buccaneers from Geraldton, and Souwest Slammers from Bunbury. Kanyana Kings from Mandurah and Goldfields Giants from Kalgoorlie joined in 1990.

In 2017, the SBL shifted to the 40-minute game format in-line with FIBA, with games consisting of ten minute quarters as opposed to the twelve minute quarters under the previous 48-minute format.

Due to the COVID-19 pandemic, the 2020 SBL season was cancelled and later replaced by the amateur-based West Coast Classic.

In October 2020, Basketball Western Australia and the National Basketball League (NBL) announced a new partnership to bring NBL1 to Western Australia in 2021, with NBL1 replacing the SBL. The SBL was officially renamed NBL1 West and became the west conference of NBL1.

In 2024, an NBL1 West record grand final crowd – also a national record – of 6,460 attended RAC Arena. The 2024 men's grand final set a national viewership record of 333,865 minutes watched. In 2025, the NBL1 West led all NBL1 conferences in streaming numbers, with the men's grand final being the most-viewed NBL1 match in 2025.

In March 2026, it was announced that a Geraldton Buccaneers women's team would enter the 2027 NBL1 West season.

== Current clubs ==
Locations of metropolitan clubs
Locations of regional clubs

Team	Location	Arena	Debut season	
Team	Location	Arena	Women's	Men's
Cockburn Cougars	Hamilton Hill, City of Cockburn	Wally Hagan Stadium	1989	1989
East Perth Eagles	Morley, City of Bayswater	Morley Sport and Recreation Centre	1989	1989
Geraldton Buccaneers	Geraldton	Activewest Stadium	2005^{[e]} 2027	1989
Goldfields Giants	Kalgoorlie	Goldfields Basketball Stadium	2022	1990
Joondalup Wolves^{[a]}	Joondalup, City of Joondalup	Arena Joondalup	1989	1989
Kalamunda Eastern Suns	Lesmurdie, City of Kalamunda	Ray Owen Sports Centre	2008	2008
Lakeside Lightning	North Lake, City of Cockburn	Lakeside Recreation Centre	2001	2000
Mandurah Magic^{[b]}	Mandurah	Mandurah Aquatic & Recreation Centre	1996	1990
Perry Lakes Hawks	Floreat, Town of Cambridge	Bendat Basketball Centre	1989	1989
Perth Redbacks	Belmont, City of Belmont	Belmont Oasis Leisure Centre	1989	1989
Rockingham Flames	Rockingham, City of Rockingham	Mike Barnett Sports Complex	1992	1994
South West Slammers^{[c]}	Bunbury	Eaton Recreation Centre	1992	1989
Warwick Senators^{[d]}	Warwick, City of Joondalup	Warwick Stadium	1989	1989
Willetton Tigers	Willetton, City of Canning	Willetton Basketball Stadium	1989	1989

^{a} Known as Wanneroo Wolves from 1989 to 2013.
^{b} Known as Kanyana Kings from 1990 to 1993, and Mandurah Kings from 1994 to 1995.
^{c} Known as Souwest Slammers from 1989 to 1994, Bunbury City Slammers from 1995 to 2004, and Bunbury Slammers from 2005 to 2008.
^{d} Known as Stirling Senators from 1989 to 2018
^{e} Folded in 2008

== Former clubs ==
Team	Location	Arena	Seasons
Rainbow Coast Raiders^{[a]}	Albany	Albany Sports Centre	Men: 1989–1999; Women: 1992–1994
Swan City Mustangs	Midvale, City of Swan	Swan Park Leisure Centre	1989–1996; 1999–2003
WAIS Warriors	Mount Claremont, Town of Claremont; Crawley, City of Perth	Superdrome; University of Western Australia	Men: 1989–1991

^{a} Known as Albany Raiders from 1996-1997, and Great Southern Raiders in 1998.

== League championships ==
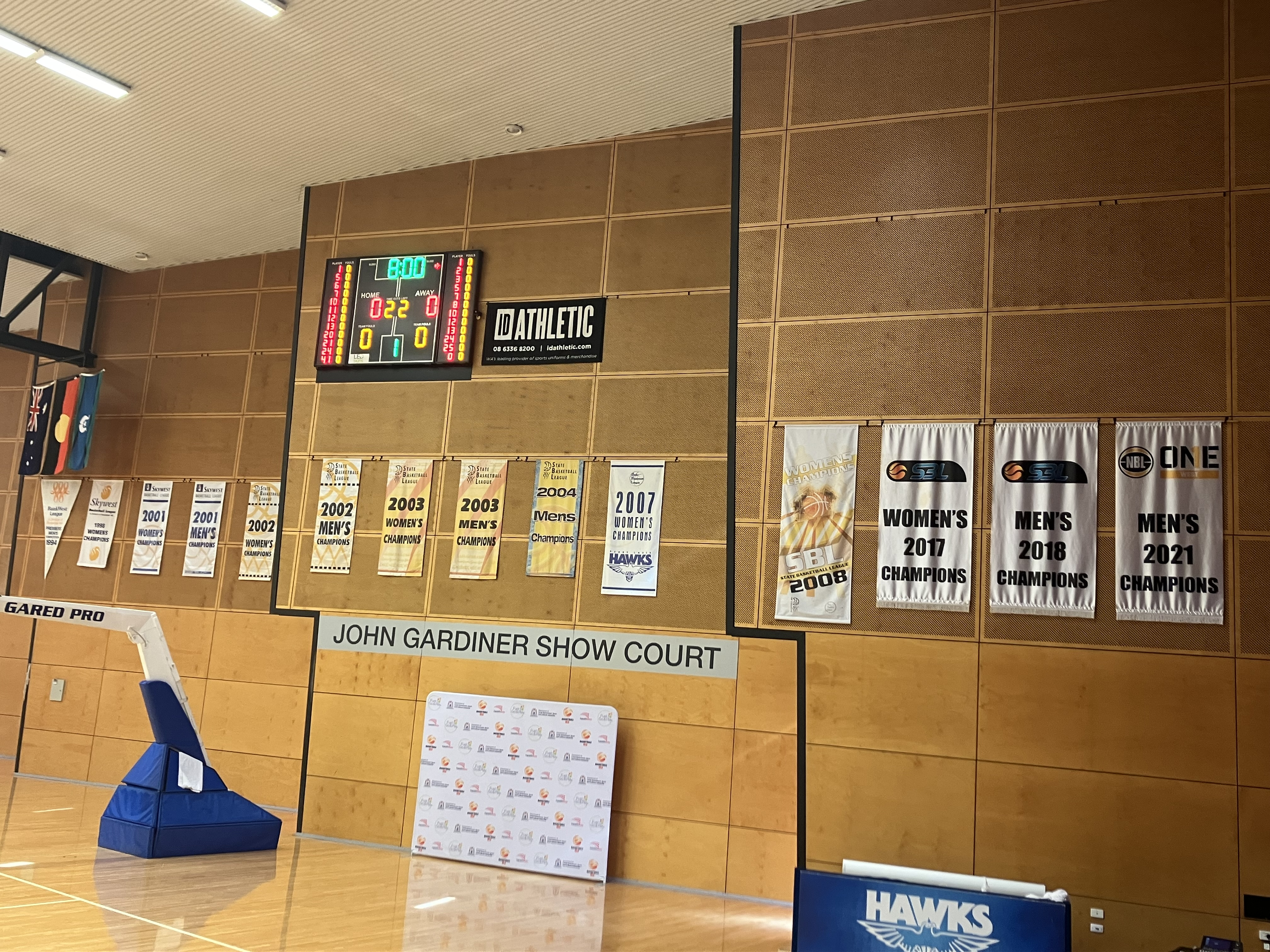
The Hawks' 14 championship banners (July 2024)

The Willetton Tigers have won the most championships in the women's competition with 9 Grand Final wins, while the Perry Lakes Hawks have won the most championships in the men's competition with 7 Grand Final wins. The Hawks women have also amassed seven titles, making Perry Lakes the most successful club in league history with a total of 14 championships.

Women			Men		
Teams		Year(s) won	Teams		Year(s) won
Willetton Tigers	9	1997, 1999, 2004, 2005, 2009, 2010, 2011, 2016, 2021	Perry Lakes Hawks	7	1994, 2001, 2002, 2003, 2004, 2018, 2021
Perry Lakes Hawks	7	1998, 2001, 2002, 2003, 2007, 2008, 2017	Perth Redbacks	4	1989, 1990, 1997, 2017
Joondalup Wolves	4	1990, 1992, 1995, 2013	South West Slammers	4	1995, 1996, 1998, 1999
Rockingham Flames	4	2014, 2015, 2019, 2024	Geraldton Buccaneers	4	2000, 2019, 2023, 2025
Swan City Mustangs^{†}	3	1991, 1993, 1996	Lakeside Lightning	4	2005, 2006, 2009, 2013
Warwick Senators	3	1994, 2022, 2026	Cockburn Cougars	3	1992, 2012, 2016
Perth Redbacks	2	1989, 2000	Joondalup Wolves	3	1993, 2011, 2015
Lakeside Lightning	2	2006, 2018	Goldfields Giants	2	2007, 2008
Cockburn Cougars	2	2023, 2025	Rockingham Flames	2	2022, 2026
South West Slammers	1	2012	Swan City Mustangs^{†}	1	1991
			Willetton Tigers	1	2010
			East Perth Eagles	1	2014
			Mandurah Magic	1	2024
^{†} indicates club is not a current member of NBL1 West

== See also ==
- List of NBL1 West awards
- List of NBL1 West champions
