= Joondalup Wolves =

- Leagues: NBL1 West
- Founded: 1989
- History: Wanneroo Wolves; 1989–2013; Joondalup Wolves; 2014–present
- Arena: Arena Joondalup
- Location: Joondalup, Western Australia
- Team colors: Green & white
- CEO: Rob Kennedy
- President: Ryan Hunter
- Vice-president: Glen Simpson
- Head coach: M: Lucas Allen; W: Mitchell Langford
- Championships: 7
- Website: NBL1.com.au

Joondalup Wolves is an NBL1 West club based in Perth, Western Australia. The club fields a team in both the Men's and Women's NBL1 West. The club is a division of Wanneroo Basketball Association (WBA), the major administrative basketball organisation in the Joondalup/Wanneroo region. The Wolves play their home games at Arena Joondalup.

== Club history ==
=== Background ===
In 1982, Wanneroo District Basketball Association was established. The association moved into Joondalup Basketball Stadium the following year. In 1985, Wanneroo debuted in the District Competition, going on to win both the A Grade Men and A Grade Women championships in 1986.

=== SBL and NBL1 West ===
1989 saw the formation of the State Basketball League (SBL) with both a men's and women's competition. Wanneroo, trading as the Wolves, entered a team into both the Men's SBL and Women's SBL. In 1990, the women's team reached their first WSBL Grand Final, where they defeated the Stirling Senators 70–67 to win the championship. In 1992, the women's team won their second championship with a 74–64 victory over the Swan City Mustangs in the grand final. In 1993, the men's team won their first championship with a 109–91 victory over Cockburn Cougars in the grand final. In 1995, the women's team won the minor premiership and reached the WSBL Grand Final, where they defeated the Mustangs 2–0 in the best-of-three series to win their third championship. In 1997, the women's team reached their fourth WSBL Grand Final, where they were defeated 62–52 by the Willetton Tigers.

In 2011, the men's team reached the grand final, where they defeated the Perry Lakes Hawks 88–83 to claim their second championship. In 2012, both teams won the minor premiership but both failed to reach the grand final. In 2013, both teams made grand final appearances, with the women defeating the Kalamunda Eastern Suns 72–47 to claim their fourth championship while the men were defeated 77–74 by the Lakeside Lightning.

In 2014, the club name was changed to Joondalup Wolves.

In 2015, the men's team claimed their second minor premiership and reached the MSBL Grand Final, where they won their third championship with a 105–75 win over the South West Slammers. In 2016, the women's team claimed their third minor premiership with a 19–3 record before going on to lose 60–58 to the Willetton Tigers in the WSBL Grand Final. The men's team meanwhile made their way through to the MSBL Grand Final, where they were defeated 96–84 by the Cockburn Cougars. In 2017, the men's team reached their third straight MSBL Grand Final, where they lost 103–70 to the Perth Redbacks. In 2018, the Wolves moved into Arena Joondalup after playing out of Joondalup Basketball Stadium for more than three decades. The men's team went on to reach their fourth straight MSBL Grand Final, where they lost 94–87 to the Perry Lakes Hawks. In 2019, the men's team claimed their third minor premiership and reached their fifth straight MSBL Grand Final, where they lost 92–80 to the Geraldton Buccaneers.

In 2020, the women's team finished as minor premiers in the amateur-based West Coast Classic. They reached the grand final, where they defeated the Perry Lakes Hawks 72–54.

In 2021, the SBL was rebranded as NBL1 West. The Wolves women reached the grand final in the inaugural NBL1 West season, where they were defeated by the Willetton Tigers 65–54. In 2023, the men reached the NBL1 West grand final, where they lost 86–80 to the Geraldton Buccaneers.

== Accolades ==
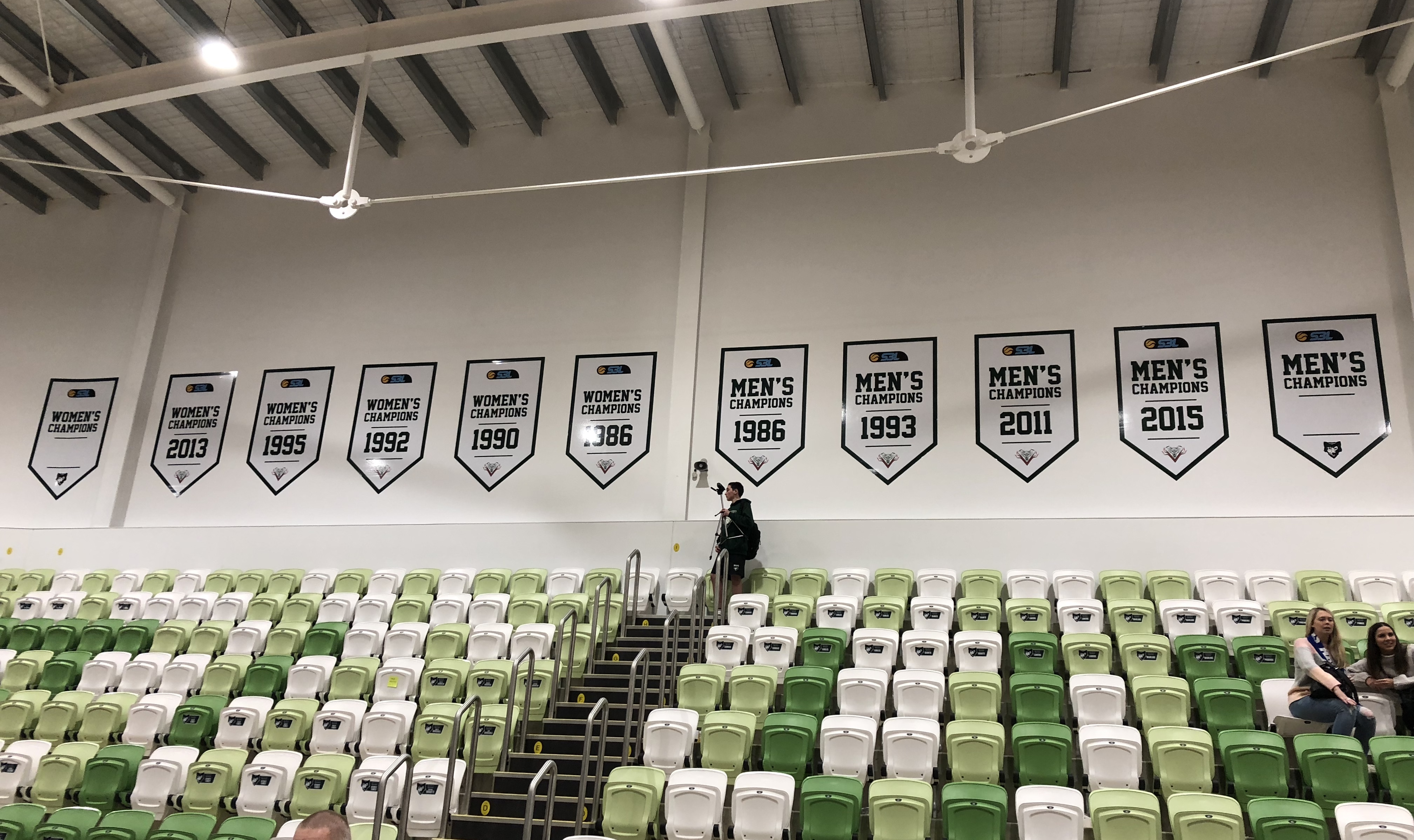
The Wolves' championship banners at Arena Joondalup, 2018

Women

- Championships: 4 (1990, 1992, 1995, 2013)
- Grand Final appearances: 7 (1990, 1992, 1995, 1997, 2013, 2016, 2021)
- Minor premierships: 3 (1995, 2012, 2016)

Men

- Championships: 3 (1993, 2011, 2015)
- Grand Final appearances: 9 (1993, 2011, 2013, 2015, 2016, 2017, 2018, 2019, 2023)
- Minor premierships: 3 (2012, 2015, 2019)
