= Willetton Tigers =

Basketball club based in Willetton, Western Australia

- Leagues: NBL1 West
- Founded: 1989
- History: Willetton Tigers; 1989–present
- Arena: Willetton Basketball Stadium
- Location: Perth, Western Australia
- Team colors: Navy blue and white
- CEO: Mark Winnett
- Chairman: Brad Counsel
- Head coach: M: Adam Nener; W: Sue Williams
- Championships: 10
- Website: NBL1.com.au

Willetton Tigers is an NBL1 West club based in Perth, Western Australia. The club fields a team in both the Men's and Women's NBL1 West. The club is a division of Willetton Basketball Association (WBA), the major administrative basketball organisation in the Melville/Canning region. The Tigers play their home games at Willetton Basketball Stadium.

== Club history ==
=== Background ===
In 1971, a chance meeting set in motion the formation of the Basketball Division of the Willetton Sports Club (WSC). In 1973, the Basketball Division of WSC was formed. At this time, teams representing the Basketball Division of WSC competed in the Canning Districts Basketball Association in Riverton.

In 1978–79, following strong growth in numbers for basketball, the council built four asphalt outdoor courts at the Burrendah / Willetton Reserve. At this time, Willetton basketball teams relocated from Canning Districts Basketball Association to form its own domestic competition as the Willetton Basketball Division of WSC. In 1979–80, Tangney Districts Basketball Association was formed by amalgamating Melville Districts Basketball Association and Willetton Basketball Division of WSC. Following further growth in numbers, the existing facility was expanded to eight outdoor courts, and by the end of 1985, a new four-court indoor stadium was completed. The stadium did not receive expansion until 2020, with an extra four courts added.

In 1987, the Tangney Tigers A-grade men's and women's teams won premierships in the District Competition.

In 1988, Willetton Basketball Association (still a Division of WSC) was formed and Tangney Districts Basketball Association ceased to exist. The association became incorporated in 2004, and transitioned from being a Division of WSC to an Affiliate of WSC in 2007. In 2011, the WSC ceased to trade.

=== SBL / NBL1 West ===
1989 saw the formation of the State Basketball League (SBL) with both a men's and women's competition. Willetton, trading as the Tigers, entered a team into both the Men's SBL and Women's SBL.

Between 1996 and 1999, the women's team played in four straight grand finals, winning championships in 1997 and 1999. They won back-to-back championships in 2004 and 2005 and then played in four straight grand finals between 2008 and 2011, winning a three-peat of championships between 2009 and 2011. In the 2011 grand final, Kate Malpass was named MVP for her game-winning shot and her 24 points, three rebounds, six assists and six steals. They returned to the grand final in 2015 and then won their eighth WSBL championship in 2016.

The men's team made grand finals in 2002 and 2008 before winning their first championship in 2010.

In 2021, the SBL was rebranded as NBL1 West. The Tigers women were crowned minor premiers in the inaugural NBL1 West season and reached their 13th grand final, where they defeated the Joondalup Wolves 65–54 to win their ninth championship. They returned to the grand final in 2022, where they lost 87–61 to the Warwick Senators. They reached their third straight grand final in 2023, where they lost 68–61 to the Cockburn Cougars. In 2024, the Tigers men reached the grand final for the first time since 2010, where they lost 91–89 to the Mandurah Magic.

== Accolades ==
Women

- Championships: 9 (1997, 1999, 2004, 2005, 2009, 2010, 2011, 2016, 2021)
- Grand Final appearances: 15 (1996, 1997, 1998, 1999, 2004, 2005, 2008, 2009, 2010, 2011, 2015, 2016, 2021, 2022, 2023)
- Minor premierships: 9 (1998, 1999, 2003, 2005, 2008, 2010, 2011, 2013, 2021)

Men

- Championships: 1 (2010)
- Grand Final appearances: 4 (2002, 2008, 2010, 2024)
- Minor premierships: 3 (2000, 2006, 2017)
