= 2024 NBL1 season =

- League: NBL1
- Sport: Basketball
- Duration: 23 March – 10 August (Conference seasons); 16–18 August (NBL1 National Finals)

National Finals
- Champions: M: Knox Raiders; W: Waverley Falcons
- Runners-up: M: Mackay Meteors; W: Bendigo Braves
- Grand Final MVP: M: Kyle Bowen (Knox Raiders); W: Rebecca Cole (Waverley Falcons)

NBL1 seasons
- ← 2023 2025 →

The 2024 NBL1 season was the fifth season of the NBL1. The season consisted of five conferences: South, North, Central, West and East.

The third annual National Finals were held on the Sunshine Coast, with two South teams winning the NBL1 National championship for the second straight year. The Waverley Falcons won in the women while the Knox Raiders men defended their 2023 National title.

== Conference seasons ==
The season began on 23 March for the Central Conference, 28 March for the West Conference, 3 April for the South Conference, 6 April for the East Conference and 11 April for the North Conference. All conference finals were concluded by 10 August.

=== South ===
The women's minor premiers were the Knox Raiders with a 20–2 record while the men's minor premiers were the Mount Gambier Pioneers with an 17–5 record. Isabelle Bourne of the Keilor Thunder was named women's MVP while Nick Marshall of the Mount Gambier Pioneers was named men's MVP.

The women's grand final saw the Waverley Falcons defeat the Keilor Thunder 87–82 while the men's grand final saw the Eltham Wildcats defeat the Ballarat Miners 79–70. Carley Ernst of the Waverley Falcons was named women's grand final MVP while Angus Glover of the Eltham Wildcats was named men's grand final MVP.

=== North ===
The women's minor premiers were the Northside Wizards with a 16–1 record while the men's minor premiers were the Mackay Meteors with a 15–2 record. Amanda Johnson of the Northside Wizards was named women's MVP while Sam McDaniel of the Brisbane Capitals was named men's MVP.

The women's grand final series saw the Rockhampton Cyclones defeat the Northside Wizards 2–1, with the Wizards winning 80–71 in game one and the Cyclones winning 81–76 in game two and 80–59 in game three, while the men's grand final series saw the Mackay Meteors defeat the Brisbane Capitals 2–0, with 91–79 in game one and 102–80 in game two. Lauren Heard of the Rockhampton Cyclones was named women's grand final MVP while Todd Blanchfield of the Mackay Meteors was named men's grand final MVP.

=== Central ===
The women's minor premiers were the Sturt Sabres with a 14–4 record while the men's minor premiers were the South Adelaide Panthers with a 15–3 record. Casey Samuels of the Central Districts Lions was named women's MVP while Alex Starling of the South Adelaide Panthers was named men's MVP.

The women's grand final saw the Central Districts Lions defeat the Forestville Eagles 79–67 while the men's grand final saw the Forestville Eagles defeat the South Adelaide Panthers 92–90. Taylah Levy of the Central Districts Lions was named women's grand final MVP while Greg Mays of the Forestville Eagles was named men's grand final MVP.

=== West ===
The women's minor premiers were the Rockingham Flames with an 18–2 record while the men's minor premiers were the Geraldton Buccaneers with a 20–2 record. Teige Morrell of the Lakeside Lightning was named women's MVP while Joel Murray of the Mandurah Magic was named men's MVP.

The women's grand final saw the Rockingham Flames defeat the Cockburn Cougars 97–81 while the men's grand final saw the Mandurah Magic defeat the Willetton Tigers 91–89. Alexandra Sharp of the Rockingham Flames was named women's grand final MVP while Joel Murray of the Mandurah Magic was named men's grand final MVP.

=== East ===
The women's minor premiers were the Albury Wodonga Bandits with a 20–0 record while the men's minor premiers were the Canberra Gunners with an 18–2 record. Nicole Munger of the Newcastle Falcons was named women's MVP while William Cranston-Lown of the Maitland Mustangs was named men's MVP.

The BA Centre of Excellence women's team, who finished the regular season with a 10–10 record, declared that they were not able to field a team for finals. They were subsequently removed from the East finals equation and the ladder was adjusted.

The women's grand final saw the Newcastle Falcons defeat the Sutherland Sharks 85–78 while the men's grand final saw the Maitland Mustangs defeat the Canberra Gunners 86–67. Nicole Munger of the Newcastle Falcons was named women's grand final MVP while William Cranston-Lown of the Maitland Mustangs was named men's grand final MVP.

=== Champions summary ===
==== Women ====
Conference	Champion	Result	Runner-up
South	Waverley Falcons	87 – 82	Keilor Thunder
North	Rockhampton Cyclones	2 – 1 (71–80, 81–76, 80–59)	Northside Wizards
Central	Central Districts Lions	79 – 67	Forestville Eagles
West	Rockingham Flames	97 – 81	Cockburn Cougars
East	Newcastle Falcons	85 – 78	Sutherland Sharks

==== Men ====
Conference	Champion	Result	Runner-up
South	Eltham Wildcats	79 – 70	Ballarat Miners
North	Mackay Meteors	2 – 0 (91–79, 102–80)	Brisbane Capitals
Central	Forestville Eagles	92 – 90	South Adelaide Panthers
West	Mandurah Magic	91 – 89	Willetton Tigers
East	Maitland Mustangs	86 – 67	Canberra Gunners

== National Finals ==
The 2024 NBL1 National Finals took place at the University of the Sunshine Coast and Caloundra Indoor Stadium on the Sunshine Coast from Friday 16 August and Sunday 18 August.

The 2023 defending champions, the Bendigo Braves women and the Knox Raiders men, earned automatic qualification into the 2024 NBL1 National Finals. Joining them in the tournament were the 2024 champions from each of the five conferences. Due to multiple injuries sustained during the grand final series, the North women's champions the Rockhampton Cyclones withdrew from the National Finals. The Southern Districts Spartans subsequently took their place.

The six women's and men's teams were ranked based on their regular season performances while factoring the number of games within a season and the number of NBL/WNBL players and imports within each conference. The three winners from day one, plus the highest ranked loser, progressed to the Semi Finals on day two. The winners of the Semi Finals then played in the Championship Games on day three. The day one match-ups were announced on 11 August, with the women playing at UniSC Arena and the men playing at Caloundra Indoor Stadium. The day two matches saw the women shift to Caloundra while the men shifted to UniSC. The Championship Games on day three were both played at UniSC.

Two South Conference teams were victorious in the Championship Games for the second straight year, with the Waverley Falcons women and Knox Raiders men being crowned NBL1 National champions. The Raiders defended their 2023 title.

=== Day One – Friday ===
==== Women ====
- Rank #1 vs Rank #6

16 August 2024
3:00 pm

Box score
Recap

Rockingham Flames 81, Bendigo Braves 89
Scoring by quarter: 26–26, 23–27, 20–15, 12–21
Pts: Robbi Ryan 26; Rebs: Nes'eya Parker-Williams 14; Asts: Shani Amos 7	Pts: Megan McKay 35; Rebs: Megan McKay 18; Asts: Kelly Wilson 17
After Day 1: Rockingham 4th (-8), Bendigo 3rd (+8)

UniSC Arena, Sunshine Coast

- Rank #3 vs Rank #4

16 August 2024
5:30 pm

Box score
Recap

Central Districts Lions 78, Southern Districts Spartans 70
Scoring by quarter: 20–19, 12–23, 20–8, 26–20
Pts: Lilly Ritz 23; Rebs: Lilly Ritz 22; Asts: Casey Samuels 5	Pts: Madelyn Allen 22; Rebs: Kalani Purcell 13; Asts: Kalani Purcell 5
After Day 1: Central Districts 2nd (+8), Southern Districts 5th (-8)

UniSC Arena, Sunshine Coast

- Rank #2 vs Rank #5

16 August 2024
8:00 pm

Box score
Recap

Newcastle Falcons 85, Waverley Falcons 99
Scoring by quarter: 22–32, 25–23, 22–28, 16–16
Pts: Nicole Munger 31; Rebs: Nicole Munger 10; Asts: Elissa Brett 5	Pts: Renae Mokrzycki 25; Rebs: Carley Ernst 8 Asts: Rebecca Cole 8
After Day 1: Newcastle 6th (-14), Waverley 1st (+14)

UniSC Arena, Sunshine Coast

==== Men ====
- Rank #2 vs Rank #5

16 August 2024
3:30 pm

Box score
Recap

Maitland Mustangs 89, Knox Raiders 99
Scoring by quarter: 20–29, 28–26, 28–22, 13–22
Pts: William Cranston-Lown 33; Rebs: William Cranston-Lown 8 Asts: Millburn, Cranston-Lown 4 each	Pts: Austin Rapp 21; Rebs: Austin Rapp 12; Asts: Ke'Jhan Feagin 7
After Day 1: Maitland 5th (-10), Knox 2nd (+10)

Caloundra Indoor Stadium, Sunshine Coast

- Rank #3 vs Rank #4

16 August 2024
5:30 pm

Box score
Recap

Forestville Eagles 63, Eltham Wildcats 69
Scoring by quarter: 13–13, 13–17, 21–10, 16–29
Pts: Greg Mays 24; Rebs: Owen Hulland 12; Asts: Brad Rathjen 5	Pts: Whelan, Agosta 15 each Rebs: Sam Short 10; Asts: Sam Short 9
After Day 1: Forestville 4th (-6), Eltham 3rd (+6)

Caloundra Indoor Stadium, Sunshine Coast

- Rank #1 vs Rank #6

16 August 2024
7:30 pm

Box score
Recap

Mackay Meteors 93, Mandurah Magic 82
Scoring by quarter: 21–36, 21–12, 29–21, 22–13
Pts: Aiden Krause 22; Rebs: Aiden Krause 11; Asts: Emmett Naar 13	Pts: Joel Murray 22; Rebs: Michael Durr 19; Asts: Joel Murray 8
After Day 1: Mackay 1st (+11), Mandurah 6th (-11)

Caloundra Indoor Stadium, Sunshine Coast

=== Day Two – Saturday ===
==== Women ====
- Semi Final: 2nd vs 3rd

17 August 2024
3:30 pm

Box score
Recap

Central Districts Lions 68, Bendigo Braves 90
Scoring by quarter: 13–28, 18–16, 15–25, 22–21
Pts: Jasmin Fejo 19; Rebs: Lilly Ritz 10; Asts: Casey Samuels 6	Pts: Kasey Burton 20; Rebs: Megan McKay 12; Asts: Kelly Wilson 14

Caloundra Indoor Stadium, Sunshine Coast

- Semi Final: 1st vs 4th

17 August 2024
5:30 pm

Box score
Recap

Waverley Falcons 97, Rockingham Flames 74
Scoring by quarter: 25–27, 32–14, 15–19, 25–14
Pts: Carley Ernst 24; Rebs: Ernst, Mokrzycki 9 each Asts: McKenzie Forbes 8	Pts: Emma Gandini 18; Rebs: Nes'eya Parker-Williams 9 Asts: Georgia Pineau 6

Caloundra Indoor Stadium, Sunshine Coast

- 5th vs 6th

17 August 2024
7:30 pm

Box score
Recap

Southern Districts Spartans 85, Newcastle Falcons 75
Scoring by quarter: 24–20, 21–14, 19–23, 21–18
Pts: Madelyn Allen 23; Rebs: Emily Preston 13; Asts: Derksen, Allen, Purcell 5 each	Pts: Elissa Brett 20; Rebs: Nicole Munger 13; Asts: Nicole Munger 7

Caloundra Indoor Stadium, Sunshine Coast

==== Men ====
- Semi Final: 2nd vs 3rd

17 August 2024
2:00 pm

Box score
Recap

Knox Raiders 90, Eltham Wildcats 66
Scoring by quarter: 24–20, 22–15, 22–16, 22–15
Pts: Ke'Jhan Feagin 16; Rebs: Austin Rapp 9 Asts: Ke'Jhan Feagin 7	Pts: Sam Short 15; Rebs: Sam Short 7 Asts: Sam Short 10

UniSC Arena, Sunshine Coast

- Semi Final: 1st vs 4th

17 August 2024
4:30 pm

Box score
Recap

Mackay Meteors 95, Forestville Eagles 80
Scoring by quarter: 29–28, 22–19, 25–22, 19–11
Pts: Amarco Doyle 26; Rebs: Aiden Krause 14; Asts: Emmett Naar 13	Pts: Daniel Johnson 32; Rebs: Daniel Johnson 10; Asts: Adam Doyle 5

UniSC Arena, Sunshine Coast

- 5th vs 6th

17 August 2024
7:00 pm

Box score
Recap

Maitland Mustangs 98, Mandurah Magic 102
Scoring by quarter: 23–26, 17–31, 31–25, 27–20
Pts: Matthew Gray 25; Rebs: Christian Little 14; Asts: Christian Little 6	Pts: Molnar, Pesava 28 each Rebs: Bertram, Easley 9 each Asts: Julian Pesava 8

UniSC Arena, Sunshine Coast

=== Day Three – Sunday ===
==== Championship Games ====
===== Women =====
====== Rosters ======
Bendigo Braves
#	Player
Starters
5	Kasey Burton
6	Cassidy McLean
14	Madeline Sexton
22	Kelly Wilson (C)
25	Megan McKay
Reserves
1	Caitlin Richardson
3	Poppy Blanch
4	Meg McCarthy
10	Jessie Rennie
17	Jessica Mangan
Pos	Coach
HC	Mark Alabakov
AC	Nathan Batchelor
AC	Andrea Walsh

Waverley Falcons
#	Player
Starters
1	Amelia Todhunter
2	Rebecca Cole
5	McKenzie Forbes
11	Carley Ernst
23	Renae Mokrzycki (C)
Reserves
0	Emma Povh
3	Meg Crupi
8	Sophia Locandro
9	Liana Kinkela
10	Mia Parsons
13	Hayley Joyner
Pos	Coach
HC	Elias Palioyiannis
AC	Lisa Ewin

====== Game summary ======
Kayo Sports

18 August 2024
11:00 am

Box score
Recap
Highlights

Bendigo Braves 49, Waverley Falcons 97
Scoring by quarter: 10–25, 12–30, 9–15, 18–27
Pts: Megan McKay 12; Rebs: Megan McKay 12; Asts: Cassidy McLean 4	Pts: Rebecca Cole 33; Rebs: Renae Mokrzycki 13; Asts: McKenzie Forbes 5
Waverley wins NBL1 National Championship

UniSC Arena, Sunshine Coast
MVP: Rebecca Cole (Falcons)

===== Men =====
====== Rosters ======
Knox Raiders
#	Player
Starters
5	Brody Nunn
9	Malith Machar
10	Ke'Jhan Feagin (C)
14	Kyle Bowen
22	Austin Rapp
Reserves
1	Anzac Rissetto
8	Jacob Foy
15	Madut Akec
21	Dylan Hare
43	Tyrone Simos-Primerano
Pos	Coach
HC	Matthew Nunn
AC	Brayon Blake
AC	Brenton O'Brien

Mackay Meteors
#	Player
Starters
3	Emmett Naar (C)
4	Aiden Krause
19	Luca Yates
32	Amarco Doyle
33	Christian Maran
Reserves
0	Jerron Jamerson
2	Kye Medhurst
5	Mason Khalu
13	Kobey Sager
15	Brad Rasmussen
Pos	Coach
HC	Joel Khalu
AC	Troy Brown
AC	Nathan Arousi

====== Game summary ======
Kayo Sports

18 August 2024
1:30 pm

Box score
Recap
Highlights

Knox Raiders 87, Mackay Meteors 84
Scoring by quarter: 15–25, 27–24, 20–15, 25–20
Pts: Kyle Bowen 24; Rebs: Kyle Bowen 15; Asts: Brody Nunn 9	Pts: Emmett Naar 21; Rebs: Narr, Yates 10 each Asts: Emmett Naar 18
Knox wins NBL1 National Championship

UniSC Arena, Sunshine Coast
MVP: Kyle Bowen (Raiders)

=== All-Star Five ===
==== Women ====
- Rebecca Cole (Waverley Falcons)
- Megan McKay (Bendigo Braves)
- Lilly Ritz (Central Districts Lions)
- Robbi Ryan (Rockingham Flames)
- Kelly Wilson (Bendigo Braves)

==== Men ====
- Kyle Bowen (Knox Raiders)
- Amarco Doyle (Mackay Meteors)
- Ke'Jhan Feagin (Knox Raiders)
- Aiden Krause (Mackay Meteors)
- Emmett Naar (Mackay Meteors)
