= 2025 NBL1 season =

- League: NBL1
- Sport: Basketball
- Duration: 29 March – 23 August (Conference seasons); 29–31 August (NBL1 National Finals)

National Finals
- Champions: M: Canberra Gunners; W: Knox Raiders
- Runners-up: M: Geraldton Buccaneers; W: Cockburn Cougars
- Grand Final MVP: M: William Mayfield (Canberra Gunners); W: Paige Bradley (Knox Raiders)

NBL1 seasons
- ← 2024 2026 →

The 2025 NBL1 season was the sixth season of the NBL1. The season consisted of five conferences: South, North, Central, West and East.

The fourth annual National Finals was held in Canberra, with the East's Canberra Gunners men and South's Knox Raiders women crowned the NBL1 National champions.

== Conference seasons ==
The season began on 29 March for the Central, East and South Conferences, 4 April for the West Conference, and 1 May for the North Conference. All conference finals were concluded by 23 August.

=== South ===
The women's minor premiers were Geelong United with a 22–0 record while the men's minor premiers were the Knox Raiders with a 17–5 record. Due to a power outage in the opening game of the season at Harcourts Stadium in Ulverstone, the North-West Tasmania Thunder and Hobart Chargers men's teams finished the season with 21 games played instead of the 22 scheduled games. Jaz Shelley of Geelong United was named women's MVP while Tom Wilson of the Melbourne Tigers was named men's MVP.

The top-eight finals took place over four rounds across four weekends. The women's grand final saw the Knox Raiders defeat Geelong United 84–64 while the men's grand final saw the Sandringham Sabres defeat the Melbourne Tigers 99–80. Paige Bradley of the Knox Raiders was named women's grand final MVP while Tom Koppens of the Sandringham Sabres was named men's grand final MVP.

=== North ===
The women's minor premiers were the Southern Districts Spartans with a 13–1 record while the men's minor premiers were the Gold Coast Rollers with a 9–5 record. Unique Thompson of the Mackay Meteorettes was named women's MVP while Lamar Patterson of the Ipswich Force was named men's MVP.

The top-six finals took place over three rounds across three weekends. The women's grand final series saw the Logan Thunder defeat the Southern Districts Spartans 2–1, with the Spartans winning 87–69 in game one and the Thunder winning 89–60 in game two and 78–76 in game three, while the men's grand final series saw the Southern Districts Spartans defeat the Brisbane Capitals 2–0, with 90–78 in game one and 93–88 in game two. Leah Scott of the Logan Thunder was named women's grand final MVP while Tamuri Wigness of the Southern Districts Spartans was named men's grand final MVP.

=== Central ===
The women's minor premiers were the Forestville Eagles with a 15–3 record while the men's minor premiers were also the Forestville Eagles with a 16–2 record. Olivia Levicki of the West Adelaide Bearcats was named women's MVP while Keanu Rasmussen also of the West Adelaide Bearcats was named men's MVP.

The top-five finals took place over four rounds across four weekends. The women's grand final saw the Woodville Warriors defeat the Sturt Sabres 73–65 while the men's grand final saw the West Adelaide Bearcats defeat the Central Districts Lions 83–73. Laura Erikstrup of the Woodville Warriors was named women's grand final MVP while Cameron Huefner of the West Adelaide Bearcats was named men's grand final MVP.

=== West ===
The women's minor premiers were the Cockburn Cougars with a 20–0 record while the men's minor premiers were the Rockingham Flames with a 19–3 record. Teige Morrell of the Lakeside Lightning was named women's MVP while Isaac White of the Rockingham Flames was named men's MVP.

The top-eight finals took place over four rounds across three weekends. The women's grand final saw the Cockburn Cougars defeat the Warwick Senators 91–71 while the men's grand final saw the Geraldton Buccaneers defeat the Warwick Senators 81–78. Ruby Porter of the Cockburn Cougars was named women's grand final MVP while Johny Narkle of the Geraldton Buccaneers was named men's grand final MVP.

=== East ===
The women's minor premiers were the Manly Warringah Sea Eagles with an 18–2 record while the men's minor premiers were the Illawarra Hawks with an 15–5 record. Nicole Munger of the Newcastle Falcons was named women's MVP while Todd Blanchfield of the Illawarra Hawks was named men's MVP.

The top-eight finals took place over four rounds across four weekends. The women's grand final saw the Manly Warringah Sea Eagles defeat the BA Centre of Excellence 89–61 while the men's grand final saw the Canberra Gunners defeat the Illawarra Hawks 99–91. Taylor Wurtz of the Manly Warringah Sea Eagles was named women's grand final MVP while Derek Emelifeonwu of the Canberra Gunners was named men's grand final MVP.

=== Champions summary ===
==== Women ====
Conference	Champion	Result	Runner-up
South	Knox Raiders	84 – 64	Geelong United
North	Logan Thunder	2 – 1 (69–87, 89–60, 78–76)	Southern Districts Spartans
Central	Woodville Warriors	73 – 65	Sturt Sabres
West	Cockburn Cougars	91 – 71	Warwick Senators
East	Manly Warringah Sea Eagles	89 – 61	BA Centre of Excellence

==== Men ====
Conference	Champion	Result	Runner-up
South	Sandringham Sabres	99 – 80	Melbourne Tigers
North	Southern Districts Spartans	2 – 0 (90–78, 93–88)	Brisbane Capitals
Central	West Adelaide Bearcats	83 – 73	Central Districts Lions
West	Geraldton Buccaneers	81 – 78	Warwick Senators
East	Canberra Gunners	99 – 91	Illawarra Hawks

== National Finals ==
The 2025 NBL1 National Finals took place at Southern Cross Stadium in Canberra from Friday 29 August to Sunday 31 August. The National Finals coincided with the NBL Blitz preseason tournament, which also took place in Canberra at AIS Arena.

The 2024 defending champions, the Waverley Falcons women and the Knox Raiders men, earned automatic qualification into the 2025 NBL1 National Finals. Joining them in the tournament were the 2025 champions from each of the five conferences. Due to being unable to field a team for the National Finals, the Knox Raiders men were replaced by the minor premiers of the hosting conference, the NBL1 East's Illawarra Hawks.

Following the conclusion of the 10 Conference Grand Finals, the six women's and men's teams were seeded and the day one match-ups were set. The day one fixtures were announced on 25 August. The day two fixture announcement saw two semi finals for both men and women, plus one consolation game in each.

In the Championship Games, the East's Canberra Gunners men and South's Knox Raiders women were crowned the NBL1 National champions.

=== Day One – Friday ===
==== Women ====
- Seed #3 vs Seed #4

29 August 2025
11:30 am

Box score
Recap
Recap

Logan Thunder 85, Waverley Falcons 81 (OT)
Scoring by quarter: 19–25, 12–21, 20–16, 22–11, Overtime: 12–8
Pts: Leah Scott 27; Rebs: Leah Scott 12; Asts: Mikaela Cann 7	Pts: Katelyn Shumate 22; Rebs: Sophia Locandro 8 Asts: Millicent McCarthy 11

Court 2, Southern Cross Stadium, Canberra

- Seed #2 vs Seed #5

29 August 2025
12:00 pm

Box score
Recap
Recap

Knox Raiders 70, Manly Warringah Sea Eagles 42
Scoring by quarter: 20–7, 19–7, 21–10, 10–18
Pts: Kristy Wallace 15; Rebs: Emma-Nnopu, Young 11 each Asts: Paige Bradley 6	Pts: Taylor Wurtz 12; Rebs: Josie Bulman 10; Asts: Alex Delaney 6

Court 1, Southern Cross Stadium, Canberra

- Seed #1 vs Seed #6

29 August 2025
1:30 pm

Box score
Recap
Recap

Cockburn Cougars 132, Woodville Warriors 85
Scoring by quarter: 34–19, 35–21, 34–25, 29–20
Pts: Ruby Porter 34; Rebs: Jessie Edwards 14; Asts: Williams, Mortensen 5 each	Pts: Naomi Allotey 26; Rebs: Naomi Allotey 19; Asts: Jasmin Fejo 7

Court 2, Southern Cross Stadium, Canberra

==== Men ====
- Seed #3 vs Seed #4

29 August 2025
2:00 pm

Box score
Recap
Recap

Canberra Gunners 99, Sandringham Sabres 98
Scoring by quarter: 22–24, 29–27, 23–26, 25–21
Pts: William Mayfield 22; Rebs: Glenn Morison 10; Asts: Mayfield, Morison 4 each	Pts: Elliott Brown 28; Rebs: David Barlow 9 Asts: Elliott Brown 7

Court 1, Southern Cross Stadium, Canberra

- Seed #1 vs Seed #6

29 August 2025
3:30 pm

Box score
Recap
Recap

Geraldton Buccaneers 96, West Adelaide Bearcats 71
Scoring by quarter: 27–15, 19–21, 23–18, 27–17
Pts: Johny Narkle 29; Rebs: Mathew Wundenberg 7 Asts: Verle Williams 16	Pts: Carter Truslove 18; Rebs: Deng, Truslove 5 each Asts: Hamish Staude 5

Court 2, Southern Cross Stadium, Canberra

- Seed #2 vs Seed #5

29 August 2025
4:00 pm

Box score
Recap
Recap

Illawarra Hawks 86, Southern Districts Spartans 95
Scoring by quarter: 25–26, 29–27, 11–20, 21–22
Pts: Kobe McDowell-White 22; Rebs: Kyle Leslie 10; Asts: Kobe McDowell-White 13	Pts: Tamuri Wigness 33; Rebs: Blake Jones 14; Asts: Darcy Ryder 5

Court 1, Southern Cross Stadium, Canberra

=== Day Two – Saturday ===
==== Women ====
- Consolation Game

30 August 2025
11:30 am

Box score
Recap

Woodville Warriors 64, Manly Warringah Sea Eagles 108
Scoring by quarter: 15–25, 13–29, 18–26, 18–28
Pts: Jasmin Fejo 29; Rebs: Naomi Allotey 8 Asts: Fejo, Perkas 4 each	Pts: Sari Mowbray 18; Rebs: Kimberley Dickinson 10; Asts: Chloe Dix 6

Court 2, Southern Cross Stadium, Canberra

- Semi Final 2

30 August 2025
12:00 pm

Box score
Recap
Recap

Knox Raiders 62, Waverley Falcons 52
Scoring by quarter: 7–18, 19–8, 18–19, 18–7
Pts: Alicia Froling 20; Rebs: Alicia Froling 13; Asts: Paige Bradley 8	Pts: Shumate, McCarthy 14 each Rebs: Renae Mokrzycki 12; Asts: Batsch, McCarthy 3 each

Court 1, Southern Cross Stadium, Canberra

- Semi Final 1

30 August 2025
2:00 pm

Box score
Recap
Recap

Cockburn Cougars 89, Logan Thunder 60
Scoring by quarter: 28–14, 23–20, 17–18, 21–8
Pts: Jessie Edwards 27; Rebs: Jessie Edwards 11; Asts: Jewel Williams 13	Pts: Leah Scott 16; Rebs: Leah Scott 15; Asts: Mikaela Cann 5

Court 1, Southern Cross Stadium, Canberra

==== Men ====
- Semi Final 1

30 August 2025
1:30 pm

Box score
Recap
Recap

Geraldton Buccaneers 92, Sandringham Sabres 84
Scoring by quarter: 24–29, 17–13, 22–23, 29–19
Pts: Akeem Springs 30; Rebs: Mathew Wundenberg 12; Asts: Johny Narkle 8	Pts: Malith Machar 29; Rebs: Tom Koppens 12; Asts: Elliott Brown 6

Court 2, Southern Cross Stadium, Canberra

- Consolation Game

30 August 2025
3:30 pm

Box score
Recap

Illawarra Hawks 106, West Adelaide Bearcats 97
Scoring by quarter: 26–21, 29–26, 26–16, 25–34
Pts: Christian Maran 21; Rebs: Christian Maran 14; Asts: Lachlan Dent 11	Pts: Sean Stock 21; Rebs: Tassell, Truslove 7 each Asts: Hamish Staude 6

Court 2, Southern Cross Stadium, Canberra

- Semi Final 2

30 August 2025
4:00 pm

Box score
Recap
Recap

Southern Districts Spartans 83, Canberra Gunners 113
Scoring by quarter: 27–23, 15–30, 23–31, 18–29
Pts: Tamuri Wigness 33; Rebs: Tamuri Wigness 9 Asts: Tamuri Wigness 9	Pts: Glenn Morison 25; Rebs: Glenn Morison 6 Asts: William Mayfield 9

Court 1, Southern Cross Stadium, Canberra

=== Day Three – Sunday ===
==== Championship Games ====
===== Women =====
====== Rosters ======
Knox Raiders
#	Player
Starters
2	Paige Burrows
3	Rachel Bell
5	Kiera Glover (C)
9	Alicia Froling
22	Paige Bradley
Reserves
0	Kristy Wallace
1	Agnes Emma-Nnopu
6	Rachael Quirk
7	Emily Fisher
11	Leah Santomaggio
21	Emma Pearce
31	Katelyn Young
Pos	Coach
HC	Craig Simpson
AC	Bradley Farrell
AC	Kaleb Foster

Cockburn Cougars
#	Player
Starters
1	Stephanie Gorman
8	Jewel Williams (C)
10	Ruby Porter
13	Jessie Edwards
33	Sarah Mortensen
Reserves
2	Lily Gammidge
3	Jessica Hickey
7	Jaya Scafidi
9	Maia Clayden
11	Regan Turnour-McCarty
12	Reece Anticevic
Pos	Coach
HC	Russell Hann

====== Game summary ======
Kayo Sports

31 August 2025
11:00 am

Box score
Recap
Recap
Highlights

Knox Raiders 93, Cockburn Cougars 72
Scoring by quarter: 20–24, 26–18, 25–13, 22–17
Pts: Paige Bradley 15; Rebs: Agnes Emma-Nnopu 13; Asts: Paige Bradley 9	Pts: Jessie Edwards 28; Rebs: Jessie Edwards 14; Asts: Jewel Williams 8
Knox wins NBL1 National Championship

Court 1, Southern Cross Stadium, Canberra
MVP: Paige Bradley (Raiders)

===== Men =====
====== Rosters ======
Geraldton Buccaneers
#	Player
Starters
1	Akeem Springs
6	Johny Narkle (C)
14	Joshua Keyes
23	Mathew Wundenberg
38	Verle Williams
Reserves
0	Nikolas DeSantis
10	Aaron Ralph (C)
22	Jake Baker
33	Liam Hunt
34	Ryan Blanchett
44	William Galvin
Pos	Coach
HC	Dayle Joseph
AC	Aaron Ducas
AC	Carter Cook

Canberra Gunners
#	Player
Starters
2	James Toohey (C)
8	William Mayfield
9	Derek Emelifeonwu
11	Angus Byatt
12	Glenn Morison (C)
Reserves
3	Brooklyn Bruton
5	Cameron Pender
7	Lachlan Smith
10	William Rice
13	Zac McDermott
14	Edward Bigg-Wither
81	Theus Evan Wardlow
Pos	Coach
HC	Peter Herak
AC	Andrew Martin
AC	Mark McKenzie

====== Game summary ======
Kayo Sports

31 August 2025
1:30 pm

Box score
Recap
Recap
Highlights

Geraldton Buccaneers 67, Canberra Gunners 86
Scoring by quarter: 20–27, 15–26, 18–18, 14–15
Pts: Verle Williams 13; Rebs: Johny Narkle 9 Asts: Johny Narkle 5	Pts: William Mayfield 21; Rebs: William Mayfield 14; Asts: Emelifeonwu, Wardlow 4 each
Canberra wins NBL1 National Championship

Court 1, Southern Cross Stadium, Canberra
MVP: William Mayfield (Gunners)

=== All-Star Five ===
==== Women ====
- Jessie Edwards (Cockburn Cougars)
- Alicia Froling (Knox Raiders)
- Sarah Mortensen (Cockburn Cougars)
- Leah Scott (Logan Thunder)
- Kristy Wallace (Knox Raiders)

==== Men ====
- Tom Koppens (Sandringham Sabres)
- William Mayfield (Canberra Gunners)
- Glenn Morison (Canberra Gunners)
- Johny Narkle (Geraldton Buccaneers)
- Tamuri Wigness (Southern Districts Spartans)
