= Kyle Bowen =

Australian basketball player (born 2000)

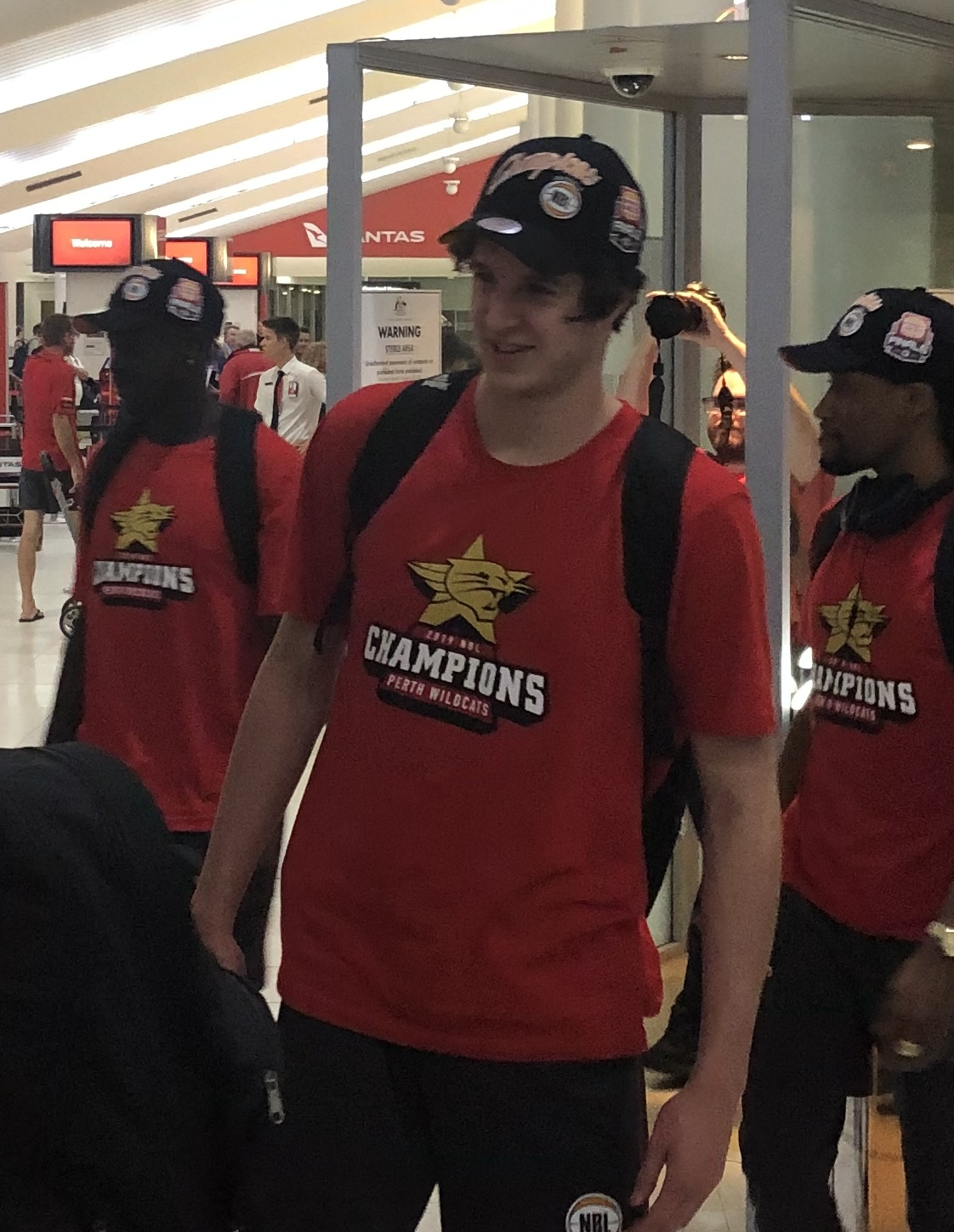
- Bowen with the Perth Wildcats in 2019

No. 14 – Melbourne United
- Position: Forward
- League: NBL

Personal information
- Born: 6 October 2000 (age 26) Perth, Western Australia, Australia
- Listed height: 204 cm (6 ft 8 in)
- Listed weight: 101 kg (223 lb)

Career information
- High school: Wesley College (Perth, Western Australia); Lake Ginninderra (Canberra, ACT)
- College: Saint Mary's (2019–2023)
- NBA draft: 2024: undrafted
- Playing career: 2016–present

Career history
- 2016–2017: Perth Redbacks
- 2017–2019: BA Centre of Excellence
- 2018–2019: Perth Wildcats
- 2019: Perth Redbacks
- 2023–present: Melbourne United
- 2024: Knox Raiders
- 2025: Canterbury Rams
- 2026: Knox Raiders

Career highlights
- NBL1 National champion (2024); NBL champion (2019); SBL champion (2017); NBL1 National Finals Championship Game MVP (2024); NBL1 National Finals All-Star Five (2024)

Kyle Bowen (born 6 October 2000) is an Australian professional basketball player for Melbourne United of the National Basketball League (NBL). Between 2016 and 2019, Bowen split his time with the Perth Redbacks in the State Basketball League (SBL) and the BA Centre of Excellence in the South East Australian Basketball League (SEABL) and NBL1. After winning an NBL championship with the Perth Wildcats in 2018–19, he played four years of college basketball in the United States for the Saint Mary's Gaels. He joined Melbourne United in 2023 and in 2024 won an NBL1 National championship with the Knox Raiders.

== Early life and career ==
Bowen was born in Perth, Western Australia, where he attended Wesley College.

Bowen debuted for the Perth Redbacks in the State Basketball League (SBL) during the 2016 season. In 12 games, he averaged 4.75 points, 2.92 rebounds and 1.08 assists per game. He re-joined the Redbacks for the 2017 SBL season, but midway through the year, he had a five-game stint with the BA Centre of Excellence in the South East Australian Basketball League (SEABL). Bowen was a member of the Redbacks' 2017 grand final team, scoring five points in nine minutes in a 103–70 win over the Joondalup Wolves to win the SBL championship. In 14 SBL games, he averaged 8.36 points, 6.29 rebounds and 1.29 assists per game.

In 2018, Bowen played 17 games for the BA Centre of Excellence in the SEABL, averaging 12.1 points, 7.4 rebounds and 2.6 assists per game.

Bowen joined the Perth Wildcats of the National Basketball League (NBL) as a development player for the 2018–19 season. He played four games for the Wildcats and was a member of their 2018–19 NBL championship-winning squad.

Bowen re-joined the Perth Redbacks for the 2019 SBL season. After playing for the Redbacks on 23 March, he returned to the BA Centre of Excellence, now in the NBL1, for the start of the 2019 NBL1 season. He played four games for the Centre of Excellence between 29 March and 5 April. He returned to the Redbacks and played in four more SBL games.

While in Canberra at the Centre of Excellence, Bowen attended Lake Ginninderra College.

== College career ==
On 28 November 2018, Bowen signed a National Letter of Intent to play college basketball for Saint Mary's College of California.

Bowen made his debut for the Gaels in the 2019–20 season. As a freshman, he played in 31 games and averaged 1.7 points and 1.9 rebounds in 11.0 minutes per game. He had a season-best seven points and seven rebounds against Loyola Marymount on 20 February 2020.

As a sophomore in 2020–21, Bowen appeared in all 24 games and made six starts, averaging 4.0 points and a team-best 5.8 rebounds in 25.1 minutes per game. He scored a career-high 10 points twice against Nicholls and Eastern Washington, and had a career-high 10 rebounds against Sacramento State on 30 December 2020.

As a junior in 2021–22, Bowen appeared in and started all 34 games for the Gaels, averaging a career high in points per game (5.6), assists per game (1.3), and minutes per game (29.4). He scored a career-high 12 points on four different occasions.

As a senior in 2022–23, Bowen was one of four Gaels to start all 35 games on the season, including four in the postseason. He finished second on the team with 33.5 minutes per game, good for the 15th-most minutes in a single season in Gaels history (1,174). He finished seventh in the West Coast Conference in rebounds per game at 7.1, a career-best, and had career-bests in assists (61), blocks (31) and steals (43). He scored 10 or more points on seven occasions, including a career-best 16 points against New Mexico State on 14 December 2022. He had 15 rebounds in a game twice during the season. He earned West Coast Conference All-Academic First Team honours for the second straight season and was named St Mary's Scholar Athlete of the Year.

== Professional career ==
On 20 April 2023, Bowen signed a two-year deal with Melbourne United of the NBL. In 36 games during the 2023–24 season, he averaged 3.4 points and 3.6 rebounds per game.

Bowen joined the Knox Raiders of the NBL1 South for the 2024 season. He put on three to five kilograms of muscle during the season. Despite missing the finals in the NBL1 South, the Raiders still had a spot at the 2024 NBL1 National Finals as the 2023 defending champions. Bowen helped the Raiders reach the championship game of the National Finals, where he recorded 24 points and 15 rebounds in an 87–84 victory over the Mackay Meteors to win the NBL1 National championship. He was subsequently named most valuable player of the final and earned NBL1 National Finals All-Star Five honours.

In the 2024–25 NBL season, Bowen helped United reach the grand final series for the second straight year. In 37 games, he averaged 3.8 points, 3.9 rebounds and 1.5 assists per game.

Bowen joined the Canterbury Rams of the New Zealand National Basketball League (NZNBL) for the 2025 season. On 22 June 2025, he recorded a triple-double with 16 points, 22 rebounds and 10 assists in the Rams' 92–86 loss to the Manawatu Jets.

On 4 April 2025, Bowen re-signed with United on a two-year deal. Prior to the start of the 2025–26 season, he was named United vice captain alongside Shea Ili. On 27 December 2025, he started in place of Finn Delany and recorded 14 points and eight rebounds in a 92–87 win over the Brisbane Bullets.

Bowen joined the Knox Raiders for the 2026 NBL1 South season.

Early in the 2026–27 NBL season, Bowen served as captain of Melbourne United.

== National team career ==
Bowen played for the Australian Crocs at the 2016 FIBA Under-17 World Championship before playing for the Australian Emus at the 2017 FIBA Under-17 Oceania Championship, 2018 FIBA U18 Asian Championship, and 2019 FIBA Under-19 Basketball World Cup.

In November 2024, Bowen joined the Australian Boomers for the 2025 FIBA Asia Cup qualifiers. In April 2025, he was named in the Boomers squad for a trans-Tasman series against New Zealand in May.
