= Matt Nunn =

Matt Nunn may refer to:

- Matt Nunn (media executive) (born 1972), Australian media executive and basketball player/coach
- Matt Nunn (politician) (born 1978), American politician
