= Sarah Mortensen =

Danish basketball player (born 1997)

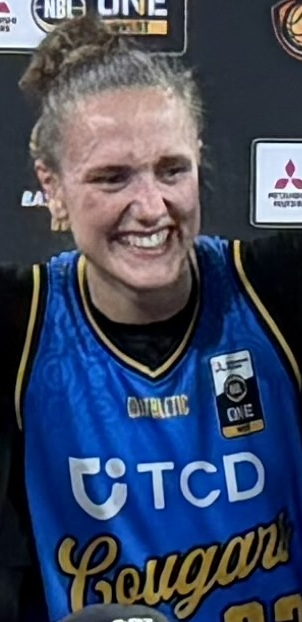
- Mortensen with the Cockburn Cougars in 2025

Personal information
- Born: 9 May 1997 (age 29) Copenhagen, Denmark
- Listed height: 185 cm (6 ft 1 in)

Career information
- High school: Long Island Lutheran (Brookville, New York)
- College: Miami (2016–2019); Villanova (2020–2021)
- Playing career: 2013–present
- Position: Forward

Career history
- 2013–2015: Falcon
- 2021–2022: TSV 1880 Wasserburg
- 2022–2023: Gisa Lions MBC
- 2023: Cockburn Cougars
- 2023: Cab Estepona
- 2024: Grindavík
- 2024–2025: Katarzynki Toruń
- 2025: Cockburn Cougars
- 2025–2026: AO Amyntas
- 2026: East Perth Eagles

Career highlights
- 2× NBL1 West champion (2023, 2025); NBL1 National Finals All-Star Five (2025); 2× All-NBL1 West First Team (2023, 2025); All-NBL1 West Second Team (2026); NBL1 West scoring champion (2023)

Sarah Sofie Mortensen (born 9 May 1997) is a Danish professional basketball player who last played for the East Perth Eagles of the NBL1 West. She played college basketball for the University of Miami and Villanova University. Mortensen is a member of the Danish national team.

== Early life and career ==
Mortensen hails from Copenhagen, Denmark. She played two seasons for Falcon in the Dameligaen in 2013–14 and 2014–15. In 15 games in her second season, she averaged 18.1 points and 9.0 rebounds per game.

Mortensen moved to the United States in 2015 to attend Long Island Lutheran Middle and High School in Brookville, New York. In her one season there, she led the school to the class AA state championship game by averaging 22.5 points, 9.5 rebounds and 3.0 assists per game.

== College career ==
Mortensen played college basketball for the Miami Hurricanes from 2016 to 2019. She transferred to Villanova but sat out the 2019–20 season due to NCAA transfer rules. During her senior season in 2020–21, she averaged 11.0 points and 5.5 rebounds per game for the Wildcats.

== Professional career ==
=== Germany ===
Mortensen played for TSV 1880 Wasserburg of the German Damen-Basketball-Bundesliga in 2021–22, averaging 11.0 points in 22 games. The following season, she played for Gisa Lions MBC.

=== Australia ===
Mortensen joined the Cockburn Cougars of the NBL1 West in Australia for the 2023 season. where she averaged 24.7 points and 11.1 rebounds per game. She earned All-NBL1 West First Team honours and was the league's leading scorer. She helped the Cougars win the NBL1 West championship.

=== Spain ===
Mortensen started the 2023–24 season in Spain with Cab Estepona of the Liga Femenina Challenge, where she averaged 5.0 points in 11 games. She left the team in mid December 2023.

=== Iceland ===
In January 2024, Mortensen signed with Grindavík of the Icelandic Úrvalsdeild kvenna. In her debut, she scored 25 points in 27 minutes. In 17 games, she averaged 19.5 points, 10.3 rebounds, 1.9 assists and 1.6 steals per game.

=== Poland ===
Mortensen joined Katarzynki Toruń of the Polish Basket Liga Kobiet for the 2024–25 season. In 21 games, he averaged 9.5 points, 5.0 rebounds and 1.0 steals per game.

=== Australia and Greece ===
Mortensen re-joined the Cockburn Cougars for the 2025 NBL1 West season. She was named to the All-NBL1 West First Team for the second time. She helped the team reach the NBL1 West Grand Final, where they defeated the Warwick Senators 91–71 to win the championship behind Mortensen's team-high 18 points. At the 2025 NBL1 National Finals, she was named to the All-Star Five.

For the 2025–26 season, Mortensen joined AO Amyntas of the Greek Women's Basketball League.

Mortensen joined the East Perth Eagles for the 2026 NBL1 West season. On 20 June 2026, she recorded a triple-double with 11 points, 13 rebounds and 10 assists in an 89–80 win over the Rockingham Flames. She was named to the All-NBL1 West Second Team.

On 26 August 2026, Mortensen signed with the Mainland Pouākai of the Tauihi Basketball Aotearoa in New Zealand for the 2026 season. She was released by the Pouākai on 20 October after being unable to make her debut due to injury.

== National team career ==
Mortensen played for Denmark at the 2012 FIBA Europe Under-16 Championship Division B and the 2013 FIBA Europe Under-16 Championship Division B.

In May 2015, Mortensen led the Denmark under 18 national team to the Nordic Championship, while being named the tournament MVP. Later that summer, she averaged 14.0 points and 8.4 rebounds in the Division B U18 European Championships.

Mortensen played for the Danish senior national team during the 2019 FIBA Women's EuroBasket Qualifiers, 2021 FIBA Women's EuroBasket Qualifiers and 2023 FIBA Women's EuroBasket Qualifiers.

== Personal life ==
Mortensen is the daughter of Rene and Pia. She is the younger sister of basketball player Daniel Mortensen.
