= 2023 NBL1 West season =

- League: NBL1 West
- Sport: Basketball
- Duration: 31 March – 22 July (Regular season); 28 July – 12 August (Finals)
- Games: 22 (men); 20 (women)
- Teams: 14 (men); 13 (women)

Regular season
- Minor premiers: M: Rockingham Flames; W: Cockburn Cougars
- Season MVP: M: Devondrick Walker (Rockingham Flames); W: Alexandra Sharp (Willetton Tigers)
- Top scorer: M: Quintin Dove (Joondalup Wolves); W: Sarah Mortensen (Cockburn Cougars)

Finals
- Champions: M: Geraldton Buccaneers; W: Cockburn Cougars
- Runners-up: M: Joondalup Wolves; W: Willetton Tigers
- Grand Final MVP: M: Johny Narkle (Geraldton Buccaneers); W: Stephanie Gorman (Cockburn Cougars)

NBL1 West seasons
- ← 2022 2024 →

The 2023 NBL1 West season was the third season of the NBL1 West and 34th overall in State Basketball League (SBL) / NBL1 West history. The regular season began on Friday 31 March and ended on Saturday 22 July. The finals began on Friday 28 July and concluded with the women's grand final on Friday 11 August and the men's grand final on Saturday 12 August.

The 2023 NBL1 season concluded with the second annual NBL1 National Finals being held at HBF Arena in Perth.

== Regular season ==
The regular season began on Friday 31 March and ended on Saturday 22 July after 17 rounds of competition. Easter games in round 2 were again scheduled for a blockbuster Thursday night, followed by Anzac Round in round 4 as well as Pink Round (7), Mental Health Round (12) and First Nations Round (15).

=== Standings ===
Men's ladder

Pos	Team	Pld	W	L	Pts	Qualification
1	Rockingham Flames	22	19	3	38	Finals
2	Geraldton Buccaneers	22	17	5	34	Finals
3	Willetton Tigers	22	15	7	30	Finals
4	Perry Lakes Hawks	22	15	7	30	Finals
5	Perth Redbacks	22	14	8	28	Finals
6	Joondalup Wolves	22	14	8	28	Finals
7	Warwick Senators	22	12	10	24	Finals
8	Lakeside Lightning	22	11	11	22	Finals
9	Cockburn Cougars	22	9	13	18	
10	Kalamunda Eastern Suns	22	8	14	16	
11	Goldfields Giants	22	7	15	14	
12	East Perth Eagles	22	7	15	14	
13	South West Slammers	22	4	18	8	
14	Mandurah Magic	22	2	20	4	

Source: NBL1

Women's ladder

Pos	Team	Pld	W	L	Pts	Qualification
1	Cockburn Cougars	20	18	2	36	Finals
2	Willetton Tigers	20	17	3	34	Finals
3	Joondalup Wolves	20	17	3	34	Finals
4	Rockingham Flames	20	14	6	28	Finals
5	Warwick Senators	20	13	7	26	Finals
6	Mandurah Magic	20	12	8	24	Finals
7	Perry Lakes Hawks	20	11	9	22	Finals
8	Kalamunda Eastern Suns	20	8	12	16	Finals
9	Lakeside Lightning	20	7	13	14	
10	East Perth Eagles	20	5	15	10	
11	Goldfields Giants	20	4	16	8	
12	Perth Redbacks	20	4	16	8	
13	South West Slammers	20	0	20	0	

Source: NBL1

== Finals ==
The finals began on Friday 28 July and consisted of four rounds. The finals concluded with the women's grand final on Friday 11 August and the men's grand final on Saturday 12 August.

=== Men's bracket ===
Qualifying and elimination finals
Jul 28, Mike Barnett Sports Complex
1	Rockingham Flames	94
4	Perry Lakes Hawks	85
Jul 28, Belmont Oasis Leisure Centre
5	Perth Redbacks	98
8	Lakeside Lightning	81
Jul 29, HBF Arena
6	Joondalup Wolves	93
7	Warwick Senators	85
Jul 29, Activewest Stadium
2	Geraldton Buccaneers	87
3	Willetton Tigers	86

Semi-finals
Aug 3, Bendat Basketball Centre
Perry Lakes Hawks	78
Perth Redbacks	89
Aug 3, Willetton Basketball Stadium
Willetton Tigers	94
Joondalup Wolves	99

Preliminary finals
Aug 5, Mike Barnett Sports Complex
Rockingham Flames	94
Joondalup Wolves	97
Aug 5, Activewest Stadium
Geraldton Buccaneers	119
Perth Redbacks	83

Grand final
Aug 12, Bendat Basketball Centre
Geraldton Buccaneers	86
Joondalup Wolves	80

==== Grand Final summary ====
Kayo Sports

12 August 2023
7:00 pm

Box score
Report
Highlights

Geraldton Buccaneers 86, Joondalup Wolves 80
Scoring by quarter: 24–19, 15–29, 19–18, 28–14
Pts: Johny Narkle 21; Rebs: Johny Narkle 11; Asts: Malik Meunier 4	Pts: Quintin Dove 34; Rebs: Bryan Michaels 14; Asts: Ioannis Dimakopoulos 5
Geraldton wins NBL1 West Championship

Bendat Basketball Centre, Floreat
MVP: Johny Narkle (Buccaneers)

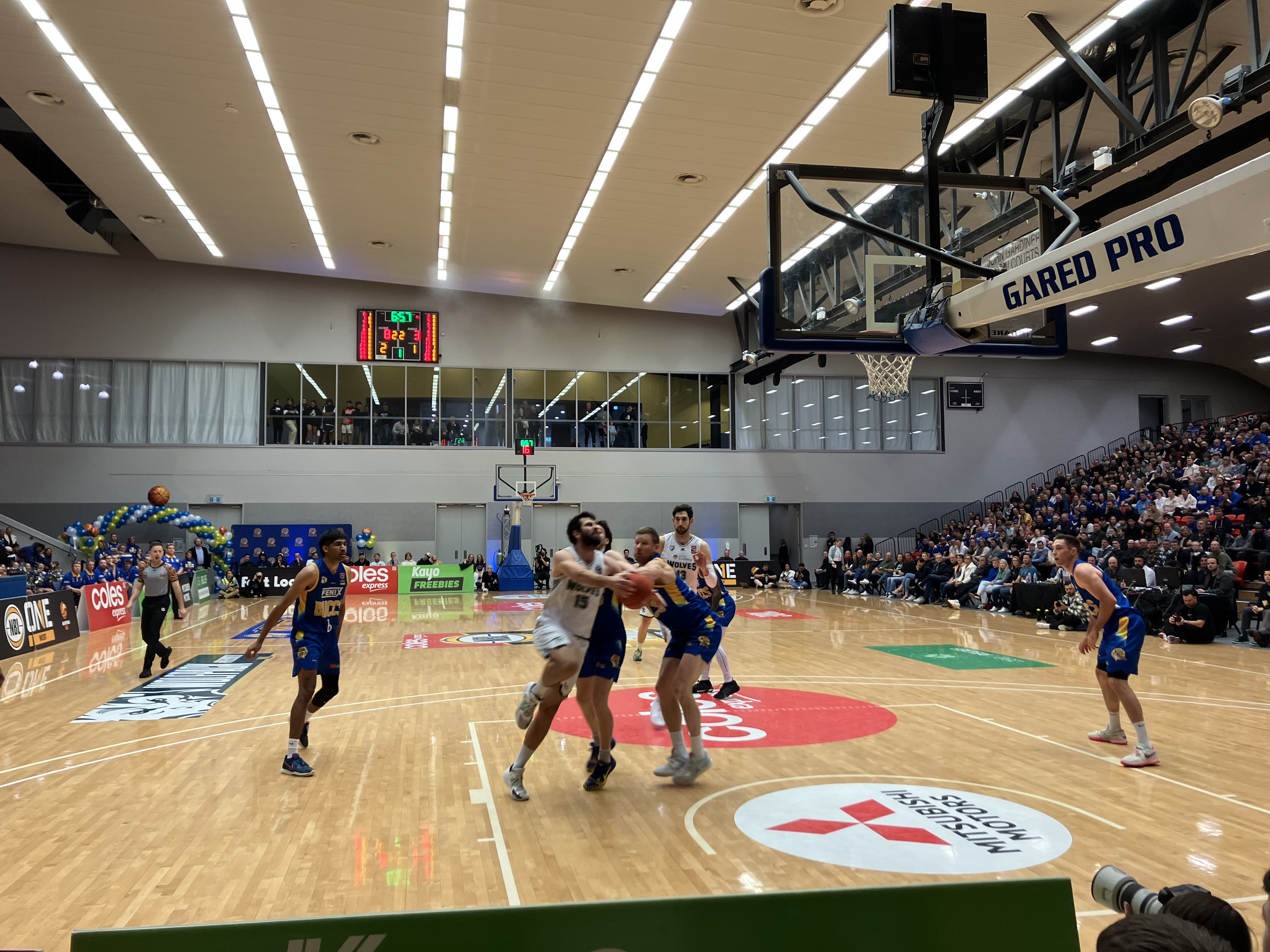
NBL1 West Men's Grand Final

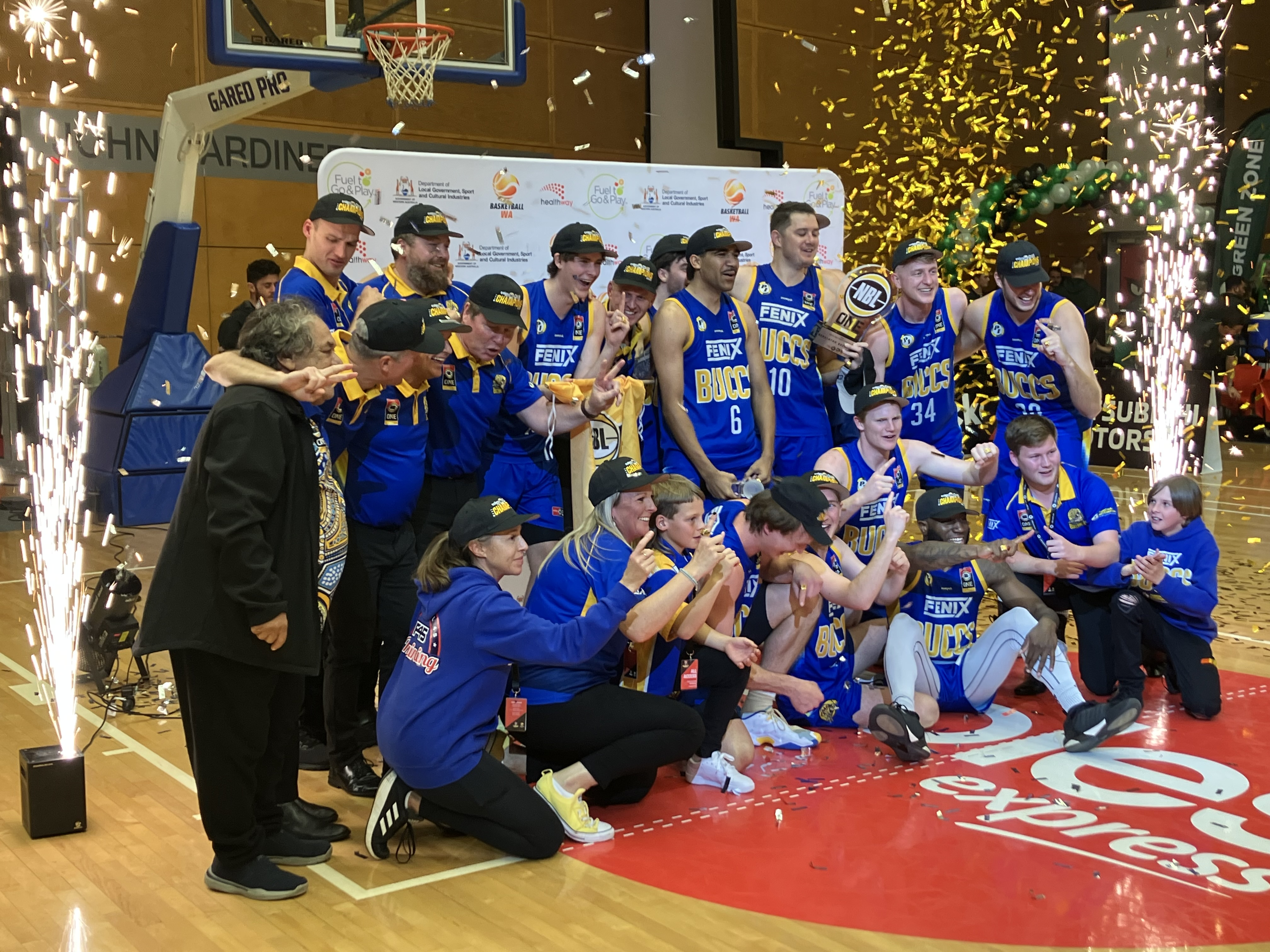
Geraldton Buccaneers 2023 Men's NBL1 West champions

=== Women's bracket ===
Qualifying and elimination finals
Jul 29, Wally Hagan Stadium
1	Cockburn Cougars	80
4	Rockingham Flames	66
Jul 29, Warwick Stadium
5	Warwick Senators	105
8	Kalamunda Eastern Suns	78
Jul 29, Mandurah ARC
6	Mandurah Magic	73
7	Perry Lakes Hawks	53
Jul 29, Willetton Basketball Stadium
2	Willetton Tigers	79
3	Joondalup Wolves	69

Semi-finals
Aug 3, Mike Barnett Sports Complex
Rockingham Flames	95
Warwick Senators	70
Aug 3, HBF Arena
Joondalup Wolves	73
Mandurah Magic	77

Preliminary finals
Aug 5, Wally Hagan Stadium
Cockburn Cougars	88
Mandurah Magic	75
Aug 5, Willetton Basketball Stadium
Willetton Tigers	81
Rockingham Flames	78

Grand final
Aug 11, Bendat Basketball Centre
Cockburn Cougars	68
Willetton Tigers	61

==== Grand Final summary ====
Kayo Sports

11 August 2023
7:30 pm

Box score
Report
Highlights

Cockburn Cougars 68, Willetton Tigers 61
Scoring by quarter: 13–14, 15–23, 18–11, 22–13
Pts: Stephanie Gorman 19; Rebs: Jessie Edwards 17; Asts: Jewel Marie Williams 8	Pts: Alexandra Sharp 21; Rebs: Alexandra Sharp 9 Asts: Amy Jacobs 5
Cockburn wins NBL1 West Championship

Bendat Basketball Centre, Floreat
MVP: Stephanie Gorman (Cougars)

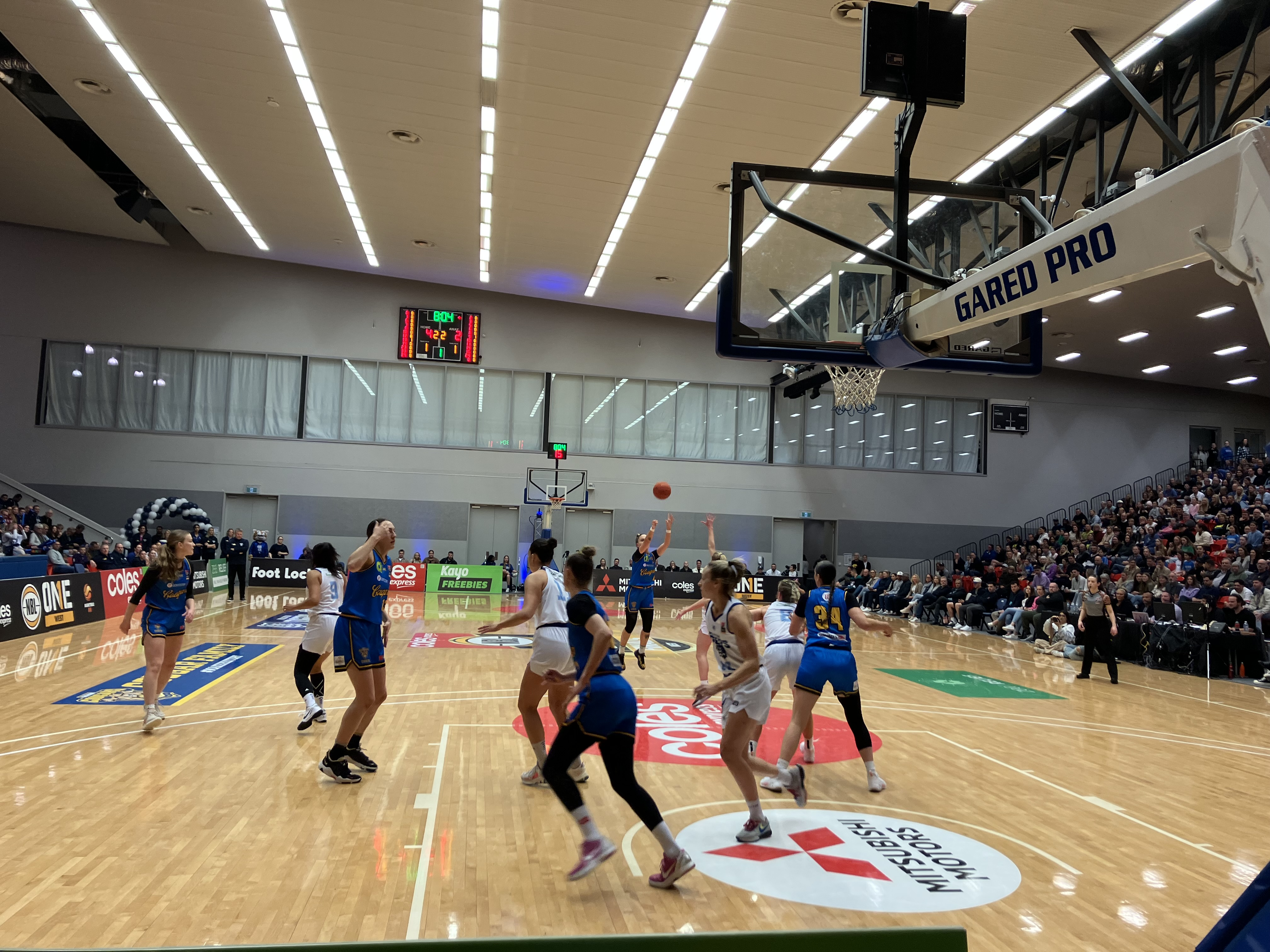
NBL1 West Women's Grand Final

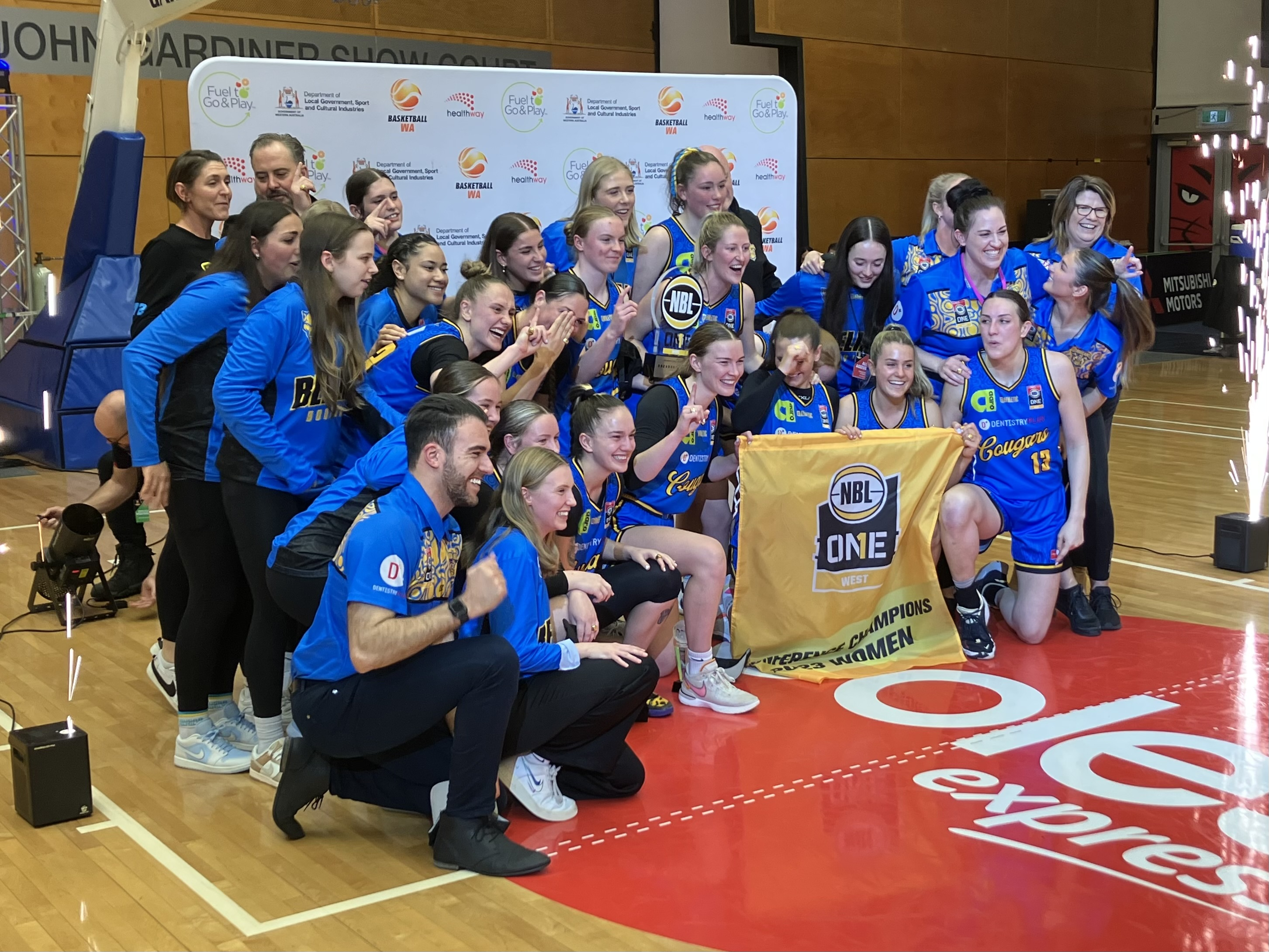
Cockburn Cougars 2023 Women's NBL1 West champions

== Awards ==
=== Player of the Week ===
Round	Men's Player	Team	Women's Player	Team	Ref
1	Devondrick Walker	Rockingham Flames	Robbi Ryan	Joondalup Wolves	
2	Buay Tuach	South West Slammers	Teige Morrell	Joondalup Wolves	
3	Hayden Brown	Lakeside Lightning	Sarah Mortensen	Cockburn Cougars	
4	Devondrick Walker	Rockingham Flames	Alexandra Sharp	Willetton Tigers	
5	Quintin Dove	Joondalup Wolves	Alexandra Sharp	Willetton Tigers	
6	Devondrick Walker	Rockingham Flames	Stephanie Gorman	Cockburn Cougars	
7	Bryton Hobbs	Perth Redbacks	Ashleigh Isenbarger	Perry Lakes Hawks	
8	Liam Hunt	Geraldton Buccaneers	Emma Clarke	Perry Lakes Hawks	
9	Joe Cook-Green	Kalamunda Eastern Suns	Darcee Garbin	Goldfields Giants	
10	Gavin Field	Cockburn Cougars	Stacey Barr	Warwick Senators	
11	Devondrick Walker	Rockingham Flames	Sarah Mortensen	Cockburn Cougars	
12	Devondrick Walker	Rockingham Flames	Robbi Ryan	Joondalup Wolves	
13	Zac Gattorna	Geraldton Buccaneers	Hannah Hank	Mandurah Magic	
14	Mitch Clarke	Perry Lakes Hawks	Sarah Mortensen	Cockburn Cougars	
15	Quintin Dove	Joondalup Wolves	Natalie Chou	Kalamunda Eastern Suns	
16	Buay Tuach	South West Slammers	Chloe Forster	Warwick Senators	
17	Joe Cook-Green	Kalamunda Eastern Suns	Sarah Mortensen	Cockburn Cougars	

=== Coach of the Month ===
Month	Men's Coach	Team	Women's Coach	Team	Ref
April	Ryan Petrik	Rockingham Flames	Marcus Wong	Joondalup Wolves	
May	Dayle Joseph	Geraldton Buccaneers	Tyrone Thwaites	Cockburn Cougars	
June	Ryan Petrik	Rockingham Flames	Simon Parker	Willetton Tigers	
July	N/A		N/A		

=== Statistics leaders ===
Stats as of the end of the regular season

Category	Men's Player	Team	Stat	Women's Player	Team	Stat
Points per game	Quintin Dove	Joondalup Wolves	28.62	Sarah Mortensen	Cockburn Cougars	24.90
Rebounds per game	Sebit Reath	East Perth Eagles	13.00	Alexandra Sharp	Willetton Tigers	13.70
Assists per game	Rowan Mackenzie	Lakeside Lightning	7.38	Mehryn Kraker	Rockingham Flames	6.43
Steals per game	Brian Voelkel	Perth Redbacks	2.77	Desiree Kelley	Willetton Tigers	3.15
Blocks per game	Tom Jervis	Rockingham Flames	2.06	Maddison Allen	East Perth Eagles	2.28
Field goal percentage	Jeremy Combs	Rockingham Flames	72.11%	Jessie Edwards	Cockburn Cougars	60.77%
3-pt field goal percentage	Rowan Mackenzie	Lakeside Lightning	48.57%	Chelsea Belcher	Joondalup Wolves	41.75%
Free throw percentage	Gavin Field	Cockburn Cougars	85.48%	Robbi Ryan	Joondalup Wolves	87.14%

=== Regular season ===
The 2023 Basketball WA Annual Awards Night was held on Saturday 22 July at the Perth Convention and Exhibition Centre.

- Men's Most Valuable Player: Devondrick Walker (Rockingham Flames)
- Women's Most Valuable Player: Alexandra Sharp (Willetton Tigers)
- Men's Coach of the Year: Dayle Joseph (Geraldton Buccaneers)
- Women's Coach of the Year: Tyrone Thwaites (Cockburn Cougars)
- Men's Defensive Player of the Year: Gorjok Gak (Willetton Tigers)
- Women's Defensive Player of the Year: Stephanie Gorman (Cockburn Cougars)
- Men's Youth Player of the Year: Ethan Elliott (Warwick Senators)
- Women's Youth Player of the Year: Chloe Forster (Warwick Senators)
- Sixth Man of the Year: Johny Narkle (Geraldton Buccaneers)
- Sixth Woman of the Year: Amy Jacobs (Willetton Tigers)
- Men's Leading Scorer: Quintin Dove (Joondalup Wolves)
- Women's Leading Scorer: Sarah Mortensen (Cockburn Cougars)
- Men's Leading Rebounder: Sebit Reath (East Perth Eagles)
- Women's Leading Rebounder: Alexandra Sharp (Willetton Tigers)
- Men's Golden Hands: (Note: Golden Hands Award winner is determined by the following equation: (Total Assists + Total Steals – Total Turnovers) / Games Played = Golden Hands Award Rating.) Brian Voelkel (Perth Redbacks)
- Women's Golden Hands: Mehryn Kraker (Rockingham Flames)
- All-NBL1 West Men's 1st Team:
  - Joe Cook-Green (Kalamunda Eastern Suns)
  - Quintin Dove (Joondalup Wolves)
  - Gorjok Gak (Willetton Tigers)
  - Malik Muenier (Geraldton Buccaneers)
  - Devondrick Walker (Rockingham Flames)
- All-NBL1 West Women's 1st Team:
  - Stacey Barr (Warwick Senators)
  - Mehryn Kraker (Rockingham Flames)
  - Teige Morrell (Joondalup Wolves)
  - Sarah Mortensen (Cockburn Cougars)
  - Alexandra Sharp (Willetton Tigers)

=== Finals ===
- Men's Grand Final MVP: Johny Narkle (Geraldton Buccaneers)
- Women's Grand Final MVP: Stephanie Gorman (Cockburn Cougars)

== See also ==
- 2023 NBL1 season
