= Quintin Dove =

American basketball player (born 1998)

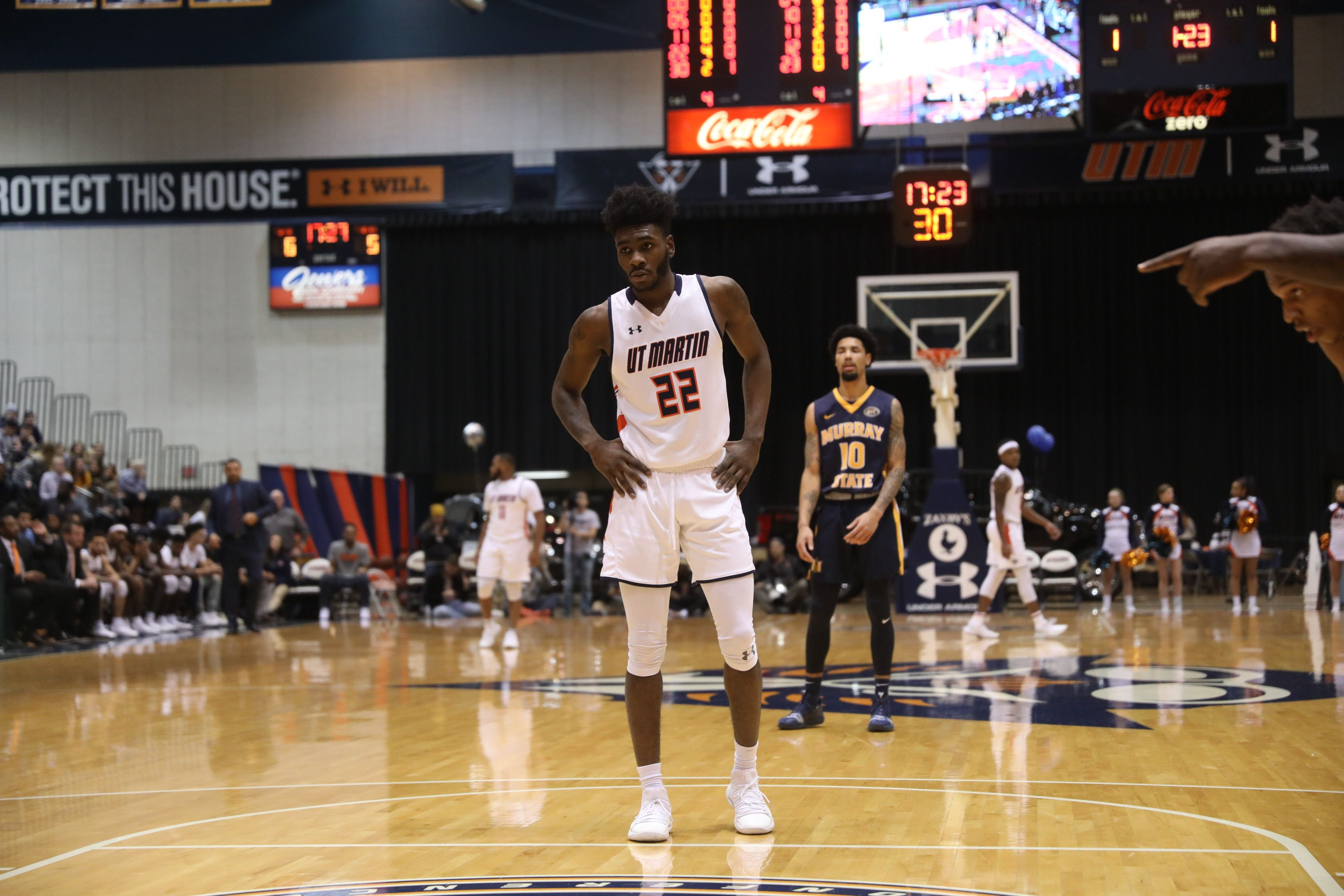
- Dove with the UT Martin Skyhawks in 2019

No. 22 – Northside Wizards
- Position: Forward
- League: NBL1 North

Personal information
- Born: June 5, 1998 (age 28)
- Listed height: 197 cm (6 ft 6 in)
- Listed weight: 90 kg (198 lb)

Career information
- High school: Villa Angela-St. Joseph (Cleveland, Ohio); Euclid (Euclid, Ohio)
- College: Cuyahoga CC (2016–2018); UT Martin (2018–2020)
- NBA draft: 2020: undrafted
- Playing career: 2020–present

Career history
- 2020–2021: BC TSU Tbilisi
- 2021: T71 Dudelange
- 2021–2022: Sparta Bertrange
- 2022: Club Atlético Olimpia
- 2023: Joondalup Wolves
- 2024–2025: Rajawali Medan
- 2024: Rockingham Flames
- 2026–present: Northside Wizards

Career highlights
- NBL1 North scoring champion (2026); IBL scoring champion (2025); IBL All-Star (2025); All-NBL1 West First Team (2023); NBL1 West scoring champion (2023); First-team NJCAA Division II All-American (2018); First-team All-OVC (2020); Second-team All-OVC (2019)

Quintin Dove (born June 5, 1998) is an American professional basketball player for the Northside Wizards of the NBL1 North. He played college basketball for Cuyahoga Community College and UT Martin.

== High school career ==
Dove attended Villa Angela-St. Joseph High School in Cleveland, Ohio, where he primarily played junior varsity basketball. He failed to join the varsity team rotation on a Division III state championship team which included Carlton Bragg. Following his junior season, Dove moved to Euclid, Ohio and joined the varsity basketball team at Euclid High School. He committed to Rider over offers from Buffalo and Central Connecticut State. However, he was unable to join NCAA Division 1 due to poor grades, so he instead opted to attend Cuyahoga Community College.

== College career ==
During his freshman season at Cuyahoga, Dove helped the team to a regional final appearance in the NJCAA Division II Tournament. He was forced to carry more of the offense as a sophomore after Wade Lowman and Devon Robinson suffered broken wrists. Dove was named OCCAC Player of the Year as a sophomore and was selected to the NJCAA Division II All-American first team. He led the team to a seventh-place finish at the NJCAA Division II tournament. Dove averaged 18.9 points and 8.4 rebounds per game. He committed to transfer to UT Martin.

On March 8, 2019, Dove scored a career-high 35 points in an 88–81 loss to Jacksonville State. He averaged 13.3 points and 5.2 rebounds per game as a junior while shooting 59.7 percent from the field. Dove was named to the Second Team All-Ohio Valley Conference. On January 30, 2020, he matched his career-high of 35 points and had nine rebounds in a 99–96 loss to Eastern Kentucky. As a senior at UT Martin, Dove averaged 20.2 points and 7.9 rebounds per game, shooting 56.5 percent from the floor. He was named to the First Team All-Ohio Valley Conference. During his UT Martin career, Dove scored 997 points and collected 390 rebounds.

== Professional career ==
On October 27, 2020, Dove signed his first professional contract with BC TSU Tbilisi of the Georgian Superliga. He left the team in April 2021 after averaging 17.1 points and 8.3 rebounds 15 games.

On July 31, 2021, Dove signed with T71 Dudelange of the Total League in Luxembourg. In November 2021, he left T71 and joined Sparta Bertrange for the rest of the season. He missed the end of the 2021–22 season after suffering an elbow injury.

In October 2022, Dove joined Club Atlético Olimpia of the Liga Uruguaya de Básquetbol. He left in November after five games after getting cut.

On March 16, 2023, Dove signed with the Joondalup Wolves in Australia for the 2023 NBL1 West season. He helped the Wolves reach the grand final, where they lost 86–80 to the Geraldton Buccaneers despite Dove's game-high 34 points. In 25 games, he averaged 28.6 points, 7.6 rebounds, 1.2 assists and 1.1 steals per game.

On October 31, 2023, Dove joined the Oklahoma City Blue of the NBA G League for training camp, but was waived on November 6.

On November 30, 2023, Dove signed with Rajawali Medan of the Indonesian Basketball League for the 2024 season. His final game for Rajawali came on March 10, 2024. On March 30, 2024, he signed with the Rockingham Flames for the 2024 NBL1 West season. He parted ways with the Flames on June 14, 2024.

On November 30, 2024, Dove re-signed with Rajawali Medan for the 2025 IBL season. He led the league in scoring with 29.28 points per game.

In February 2026, Dove signed with the Northside Wizards of the NBL1 North for the 2026 season. He finished the regular season as the league's scoring leader with 28.0 points per game.

== Personal life ==
Dove is the son of Tony and Tracey Dove. His father inspired his interest in engineering, while his mother sparked his love for cooking. Dove's aunt Bonnie Dove played in the WNBA with the Cleveland Rockers.

As of June 2026, Dove's partner is fellow basketball player, Nes'eya Parker-Williams.
