= List of NBL1 National champions =

The champion teams of the NBL1 National Finals are determined by grand final championship games at the conclusion of the finals weekend.

The men's and women's champion from each NBL1 conference competes at the NBL1 National Finals each year. The conferences include: South, North, Central, West and East.

After the inaugural NBL1 season in 2019 consisted of only the South Conference, the 2020 NBL1 season was set to be first season with more than one conference and therefore National participation. However, due to the COVID-19 pandemic, the 2020 and 2021 NBL1 National Finals were cancelled.

The inaugural NBL1 National Finals took place in 2022 at the State Basketball Centre in Melbourne. The second annual NBL1 National Finals in 2023 were held at HBF Arena in Perth. The third annual NBL1 National Finals in 2024 were held at UniSC Arena and Caloundra Indoor Stadium on the Sunshine Coast. The fourth annual NBL1 National Finals in 2025 were held at Southern Cross Stadium in Canberra. The fifth annual NBL1 National Finals in 2026 was held at the State Basketball Centre in Adelaide.

== Champions ==
=== Women ===
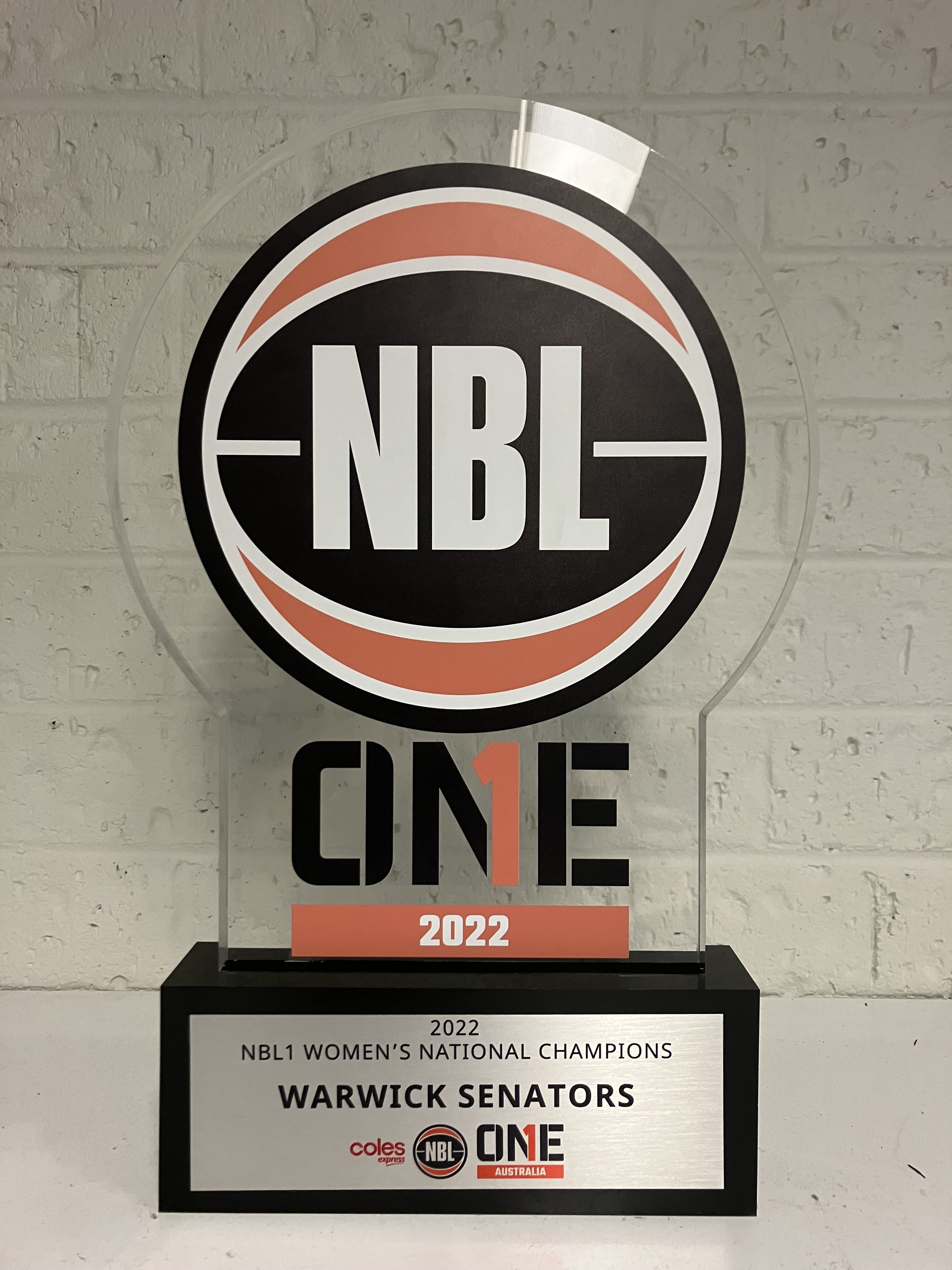
2022 NBL1 National Women's Championship Trophy

Year	Champion	Result	Runner-up	Ref
2022	Warwick Senators (West)	83–75	Ringwood Hawks (South)	
2023	Bendigo Braves (South)	114–87	Norths Bears (East)	
2024	Waverley Falcons (South)	97–49	Bendigo Braves (South)	
2025	Knox Raiders (South)	93–72	Cockburn Cougars (West)	
2026	Knox Raiders (South)	86–73	Bankstown Bruins (East)	

==== Results by team ====
Team	Win	Loss	Total	Year(s) won	Year(s) lost
Knox Raiders	2	0	2	2025, 2026	
Bendigo Braves	1	1	2	2023	2024
Warwick Senators	1	0	1	2022	
Waverley Falcons	1	0	1	2024	
Ringwood Hawks	0	1	1		2022
Norths Bears	0	1	1		2023
Cockburn Cougars	0	1	1		2025
Bankstown Bruins	0	1	1		2026

==== Results by conference ====
Team	Win	Loss	Total	Year(s) won	Year(s) lost
South	4	2	6	2023, 2024, 2025, 2026	2022, 2024
West	1	1	2	2022	2025
East	0	2	2		2023, 2026
North	0	0	0		
Central	0	0	0		

=== Men ===
Year	Champion	Result	Runner-up	Ref
2022	Rockingham Flames (West)	85–74	Frankston Blues (South)	
2023	Knox Raiders (South)	90–85	Rockingham Flames (West)	
2024	Knox Raiders (South)	87–84	Mackay Meteors (North)	
2025	Canberra Gunners (East)	86–67	Geraldton Buccaneers (West)	
2026	Gold Coast Rollers (North)	70–67	Forestville Eagles (Central)	

==== Results by team ====
Team	Win	Loss	Total	Year(s) won	Year(s) lost
Knox Raiders	2	0	2	2023, 2024	
Rockingham Flames	1	1	2	2022	2023
Canberra Gunners	1	0	1	2025	
Gold Coast Rollers	1	0	1	2026	
Frankston Blues	0	1	1		2022
Mackay Meteors	0	1	1		2024
Geraldton Buccaneers	0	1	1		2025
Forestville Eagles	0	1	1		2026

==== Results by conference ====
Team	Win	Loss	Total	Year(s) won	Year(s) lost
South	2	1	3	2023, 2024	2022
West	1	2	3	2022	2023, 2025
North	1	1	2	2026	2024
East	1	0	1	2025	
Central	0	1	1		2026

== See also ==
- List of NBL1 Central champions
- List of NBL1 East champions
- List of NBL1 North champions
- List of NBL1 South champions
- List of NBL1 West champions
