= Emmett Naar =

Australian basketball player (born 1994)

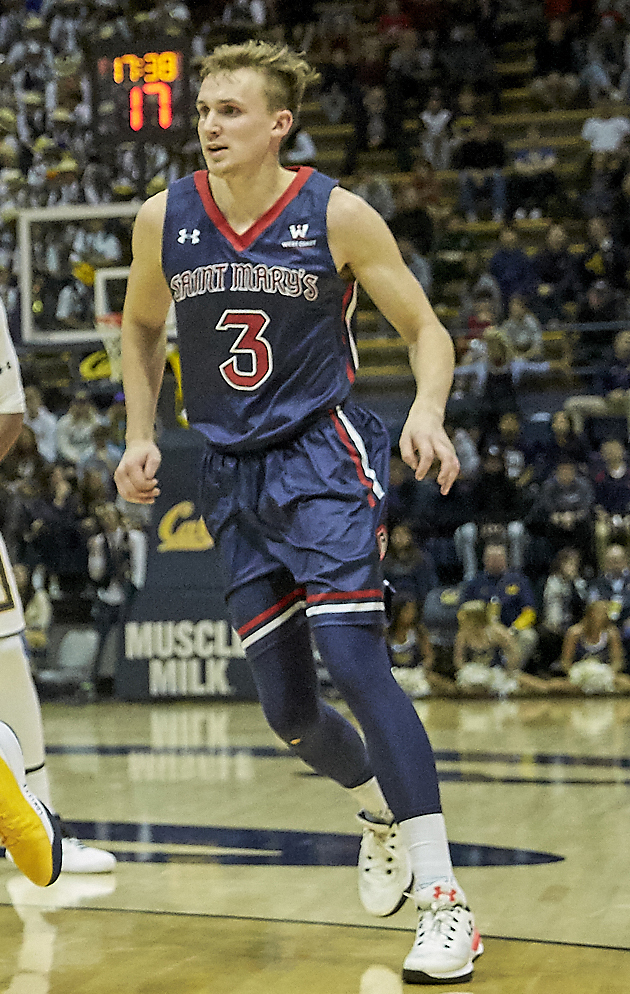
- Naar with the Saint Mary's Gaels in 2017

No. 5 – Rockingham Flames
- Position: Point guard
- League: NBL1 West

Personal information
- Born: 3 July 1994 (age 32) Canberra, Australian Capital Territory
- Listed height: 6 ft 1 in (1.85 m)
- Listed weight: 195 lb (88 kg)

Career information
- High school: Sydney Boys (Sydney, New South Wales)
- College: Saint Mary's (2014–2018)
- NBA draft: 2018: undrafted
- Playing career: 2011–present

Career history
- 2011: Norths Bears
- 2018–2022: Illawarra Hawks
- 2019: Canterbury Rams
- 2021: Ballarat Miners
- 2022: Ringwood Hawks
- 2022–2023: Heroes Den Bosch
- 2024: Mackay Meteors
- 2024–2025: Brisbane Bullets
- 2025–present: Rockingham Flames

Career highlights
- NBL1 West champion (2026); NBL1 North champion (2024); NBL1 National Finals All-Star Five (2024); All-NBL1 West Second Team (2025); NBL1 West Golden Hands (2026); Dutch Supercup winner (2022); 2× First-team All-WCC (2016, 2018); WCC All-Freshman Team (2015)

Emmett Naar (born 3 July 1994) is an Australian professional basketball player for the Rockingham Flames of the NBL1 West. He played college basketball for the Saint Mary's Gaels between 2014 and 2018 before debuting in the National Basketball League (NBL), where he played four seasons for the Illawarra Hawks.

== Early life ==
Naar was born in Canberra, Australian Capital Territory. He attended Sydney Boys High School in Sydney, New South Wales.

In 2011, Naar played for the Norths Bears in the Waratah League.

In 2013, Naar attended the Australian Institute of Sport in Canberra.

== College career ==
Naar joined Saint Mary's College of California just before classes started in 2013 and redshirted his first year. He joined the Gaels for the 2014–15 season. he had a strong sophomore year, averaging 14.0 points and 6.4 assists per game. As a junior, Naar was an Honorable Mention All-West Coast Conference selection. He averaged 9.4 points, 2.4 rebounds, and 5.6 assists per game and shot 42.4% from behind the arc. He was named first-team All-West Coast Conference as a senior. He averaged 9.5 points and 7.9 assists per game as a senior. He broke the school's all-time assist record formerly held by Matthew Dellavedova.

== Professional career ==
On 2 May 2018, Naar signed a three-year deal with the Illawarra Hawks of the National Basketball League (NBL). Following the 2018–19 NBL season, he played for the Canterbury Rams in the 2019 New Zealand NBL season.

On 15 July 2020, Naar re-signed with the Illawarra Hawks.

In 2021, Naar had a three-game stint with the Ballarat Miners of the NBL1 South.

Following the 2021–22 NBL season, Naar played for the Ringwood Hawks of the NBL1 South in the 2022 season.

On 1 August 2022, Naar signed a one-year deal with Heroes Den Bosch of the Dutch BNXT League.

Naar joined the Mackay Meteors of the NBL1 North for the 2024 season. He helped the team win the NBL1 North championship. At the 2024 NBL1 National Finals, he helped the Meteors reach the championship game, where they lost 87–84 to the Knox Raiders despite Naar's triple-double of 21 points, 18 assists and 10 rebounds. He was named to the NBL1 National Finals All-Star Five.

On 29 October 2024, Naar signed with the Brisbane Bullets as nominated replacement player for the remainder of the 2024–25 NBL season.

Naar joined the Rockingham Flames of the NBL1 West for the 2025 season. He earned the league's Golden Hands Award and was named to the All-NBL1 West Second Team.

Naar re-joined the Flames for the 2026 NBL1 West season. He was named the recipient of the NBL1 West Golden Hands Award. He helped the Flames reach the NBL1 West Grand Final, where they defeated the Geraldton Buccaneers 66–62 to win the championship. Narr had eight points, eight assists and five rebounds.

== National team career ==
Naar competed for Australia at the 2013 FIBA Under-19 World Championship in Prague. He averaged 8.8 points, 2.6 rebounds, and 2.4 assists on the fourth-place team. His best game was a 20-point outing versus China. Naar was named to the Australian roster at the 2017 World University Games.

Naar played for the Australian senior team in the FIBA Basketball World Cup 2019 Asian Qualifiers and FIBA Basketball World Cup 2023 Asian Qualifiers.
