= Tamuri Wigness =

Australian basketball player

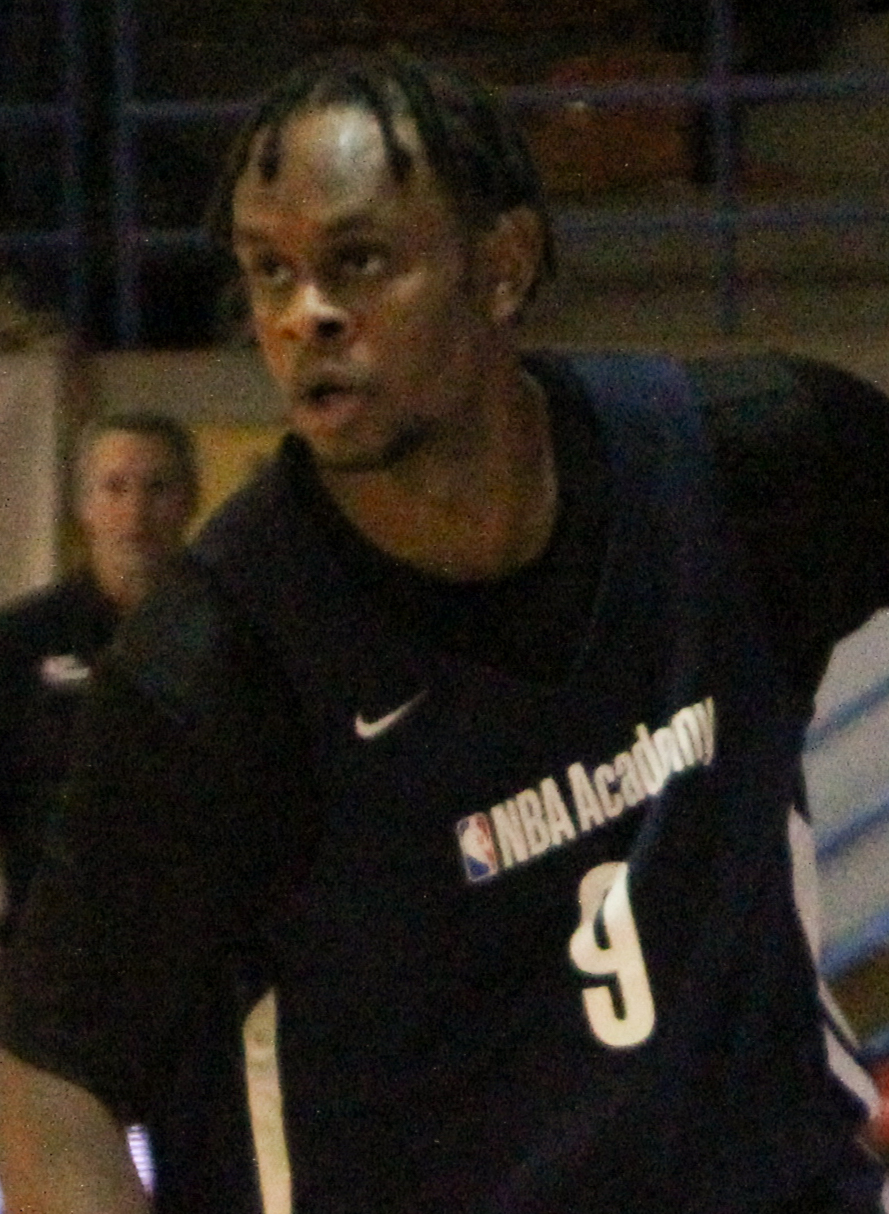
- Wigness in January 2020

Southern Districts Spartans
- Position: Point guard
- League: NBL1 North

Personal information
- Born: 26 March 2002 (age 24) Torres Strait Islands, Australia
- Listed height: 180 cm (5 ft 11 in)
- Listed weight: 84 kg (185 lb)

Career information
- High school: Cairns State (Cairns, Queensland)
- Playing career: 2020–present

Career history
- 2017–2020: BA Centre of Excellence
- 2020: Southern Districts Spartans
- 2020–2022: Brisbane Bullets
- 2021: Brisbane Capitals
- 2022: North Gold Coast Seahawks
- 2025–present: Southern Districts Spartans

Career highlights
- NBL1 North champion (2025); NBL1 North Grand Final MVP (2025); NBL1 North All Star First Team (2025); NBL1 National Finals All-Star Five (2025)
Medals
Men's basketball
Representing Australia
FIBA Asia Under-18 Championship
Gold medal – first place	2018 Thailand	Team
FIBA Oceania Under-17 Championship
Gold medal – first place	2019 New Caledonia	Team
FIBA Asia Under-16 Championship
Gold medal – first place	2017 China	Team

Tamuri Slim Wigness Jr. (born 26 March 2002) is an Australian professional basketball player for the Southern Districts Spartans of the NBL1 North.

== Early life ==
Wigness was born in the Torres Strait Islands to a Torres Strait Islander mother and a Gambian father. He moved with his family to Cairns at an early age to begin his primary schooling education. His first sporting interest began to develop while in Cairns when he played junior rugby league up until the age of 10 when his mother advised him to play basketball instead because it involved less contact. Within a year of picking up the sport, Wigness was placed in Cairns Basketball's Tiny Taipans development program and was given the opportunity to train with professional Cairns Taipans players at the age of 11.

Wigness attended Cairns State High School throughout his teenage years and while in high school he continued to play basketball as well as picking up junior Australian rules football with the Manunda Hawks in the local AFL Cairns competition where he was selected to play for multiple junior representative teams. He and fellow Cairns junior basketball standout Alex Davies were both scouted by the professional Gold Coast Suns AFL team throughout their teenage years and were offered places in the Suns' developmental academy; Davies accepted the offer to pursue football while Wigness elected to focus on basketball. The pair remain close friends and often train together in both sports when based in the same area.

At 14 years of age, Wigness was chosen to represent his home state of Queensland at the 2016 under-16 national championships and starred throughout the tournament scoring an average of 25.56 points per game, with a 45-point highlight coming against South Australia. He accepted an NBA Global Academy scholarship in 2017 and was given access to first class training facilities at the Australian Institute of Sport complex in Canberra. Later that year he was once again chosen to represent Queensland at the under-16 national championships and his dominant performances for Queensland led to selection for the Australian team at the 2017 FIBA Under-16 Asian Championship. He played a pivotal role in winning the gold medal for Australia and was named as the starting point guard in the All-Tournament Team. In 2018 he travelled to Treviso, Italy to take part in the NBA's Global Camp where he impressed scouts by forming an athletic backcourt combination with fellow Australian guard Josh Green.

Wigness was also a part of the gold medal-winning Australian teams at the 2018 FIBA Under-18 Asian Championship and the 2019 FIBA Oceania Under-18 Championship as well as competing for his home nation at the 2018 FIBA Under-17 Basketball World Cup and the 2019 FIBA Under-19 Basketball World Cup.

Between 2017 and 2020, Wigness attended and played for the BA Centre of Excellence in the SEABL, NBL1 and Waratah League. In the 2019 NBL1 season, he averaged 11.7 points, four assists and 3.4 rebounds per game. In his season finale, he posted 22 points and 12 assists. Wigness was put on the radar of several college and NBA scouts when he travelled to Charlotte, North Carolina to compete in the 2019 Basketball Without Borders Global Camp and walked away with All-Tournament honours.

In 2020, Wigness played for the Southern Districts Spartans in the Queensland State League (QSL).

== Professional career ==
On 20 July 2020, Wigness announced his decision to forego the American college system and instead signed a two-year contract with the Brisbane Bullets of the National Basketball League (NBL) as a part of their Next Stars program. He played 44 games for the Bullets over two seasons.

During the 2021 off-season, Wigness had a short stint with the Brisbane Capitals in the NBL1 North. In 2022, he played for the North Gold Coast Seahawks in the NBL1 North.

In March 2025, after a few seasons off due to injury, Wigness signed with the Southern Districts Spartans for the 2025 NBL1 North season. He helped the Spartans win the NBL1 North championship while earning grand final MVP honours. For the season, he was named NBL1 North All Star First Team. At the 2025 NBL1 National Finals, he was named to the All-Star Five.

Wigness re-joined the Southern Districts Spartans for the 2026 NBL1 North season. In July 2026, he was named in the Indigenous Basketball Australia All-Stars team for an exhibition match against Maori Basketball New Zealand.

== National team career ==
Wigness has represented Australia in several junior international tournaments, including at the 2019 FIBA Under-19 Basketball World Cup and the 2018 FIBA Under-17 Basketball World Cup. At the 2019 Under 17 FIBA Oceania Championship, he made the All-Star Five.
