= Joshua Key =

Joshua Key may refer to:

- Joshua Key (soldier) (born 1978), U.S. Army deserter
- Joshua Key (footballer) (born 1999), English footballer

== See also ==
- Josh Keyes
