= Josh Keyes =

Josh or Joshua Keyes may refer to:

- Josh Keyes (artist) (born 1969), American artist
- Josh Keyes (American football) (born 1993), American football linebacker
- Josh Keyes (footballer) (born 2006), English footballer
- Joshua Keyes, American basketball player who plays for Basketligaen Norge

== See also ==
- Joshua Key (disambiguation)
