= Canberra Basketball =

Basketball team in Canberra, Australia

- Leagues: NBL1 East
- History: Men: Canberra Gunners; 1988–present Women: Canberra Nationals; 2005–2011; 2019–present Canberra Capitals Academy; 2012–2018
- Arena: Southern Cross Stadium
- Location: Canberra, ACT
- Team colors: Yellow and blue
- Ownership: Basketball ACT
- Championships: Men: NBL1 (1): 2025; NBL1 East (2): 2022; 2025; Women: Waratah League (1): 2011
- Conference titles: SEABL (1): 2003
- Website: NBL1.com.au

Canberra Basketball is a NBL1 East club based in Canberra. The club fields the Canberra Gunners in the Men's NBL1 East and the Canberra Nationals in the Women's NBL1 East. The club is affiliated with Basketball ACT, the governing body for basketball in the Australian Capital Territory. The Gunners and Nationals play their home games at Southern Cross Stadium.

== Club history ==
=== Canberra Gunners in the SEABL (1988–2018) ===
In 1988, the Canberra Gunners made their debut in the South East Australian Basketball League (SEABL). They missed the playoffs in each of their first six seasons. In 2003, the Gunners finished first in the SEABL East Conference with a 20–6 record and went on to win the East Conference championship with a 90–76 victory over the Hume City Broncos in the grand final. That year, the Canberra Cannons folded from the NBL, leaving the Gunners as the city's only elite male basketball team. In 2006, the Gunners finished first in the East Conference with an 18–8 record but lost in the conference grand final to the Geelong Supercats. In 2007, the Gunners returned to the SEABL East Conference grand final, where they again lost to the Supercats. The team went on miss the SEABL playoffs every year between 2008 and 2018, including losing every match in 2018. The Gunners reached the 30-year milestone playing in the SEABL.

=== Canberra Nationals in the Waratah League (2005–2011) ===
Up until 2004, the ACT Academy of Sport competed in the men's and women's Waratah League in New South Wales.

In 2005, the Canberra Nationals emerged and debuted in the Waratah League. The Nationals women played in the Waratah League every year up until 2011. They were runners-up in 2005 and 2010 before winning the Waratah League championship in 2011.

During this time, there was a short-lived Canberra Nationals men's team that also played in the Waratah League, competing in four seasons between 2005 and 2008. Future NBL player Jesse Wagstaff played for the Nationals men in 2005.

=== Canberra Capitals Academy in the SEABL (2012–2018) ===
In December 2011, the Nationals women were promoted to the SEABL for the 2012 season, marking Canberra's first ever women's SEABL team. The team was subsequently rebranded as the Canberra Capitals Academy under the banner of the Canberra Capitals WNBL team. In July 2015, the Capitals Academy lost 119–37 to the Nunawading Spectres. The 82-point margin was the third-biggest in women's SEABL history, behind Dandenong's 89-point win over Kilsyth in 1991 and Nunawading's 87-point win over Illawarra in 1999. In seven SEABL seasons between 2012 and 2018, the Canberra Capitals Academy missed the playoffs each year.

=== Post-SEABL years (2019–2021) ===
Following the 2018 SEABL season, the competition was dissolved. Basketball ACT opted not to pursue a place in the Victorian-led NBL1 and instead entered the Canberra Gunners into the Waratah League for the 2019 season. The women's team also returned to the Waratah League and was subsequently rebranded back to the Canberra Nationals. The Nationals went on to earn a runners-up finish in 2019. The Gunners and the Nationals continued in the Waratah League in 2020 but withdrew mid season due to the COVID-19 pandemic. In 2021, both teams once again endured an interrupted Waratah League season, with the league being shut down mid season due to COVID-19 and border restrictions.

=== NBL1 East (2022–present) ===
In October 2021, the Waratah League was rebranded as NBL1 East after becoming the East conference of NBL1. The Gunners and the Nationals subsequently entered the 2022 NBL1 season. The Gunners went on to win the 2022 NBL1 East championship with a 76–73 grand final victory over the Maitland Mustangs. In 2024, the Gunners returned to the NBL1 East Grand Final, where they lost 86–67 to the Mustangs. In 2025, the Gunners reached the NBL1 East Grand Final, where they defeated the Illawarra Hawks 99–91 to win their second championship. At the 2025 NBL1 National Finals, the Gunners reached the championship game, where they defeated the Geraldton Buccaneers 86–67 to win the NBL1 National championship. The Gunners returned to the National Finals in 2026 as the defending champions.

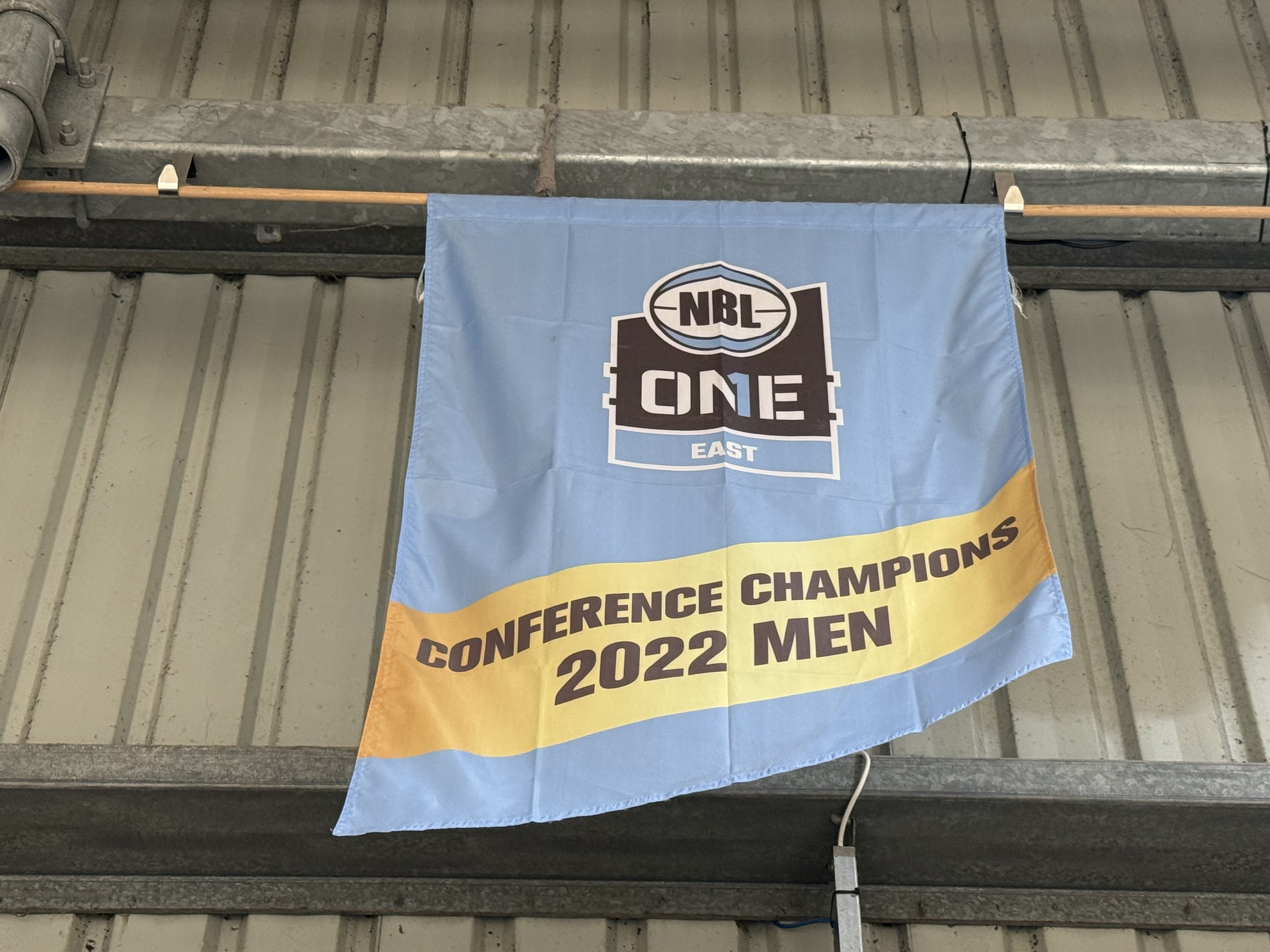
2022 NBL1 East championship banner

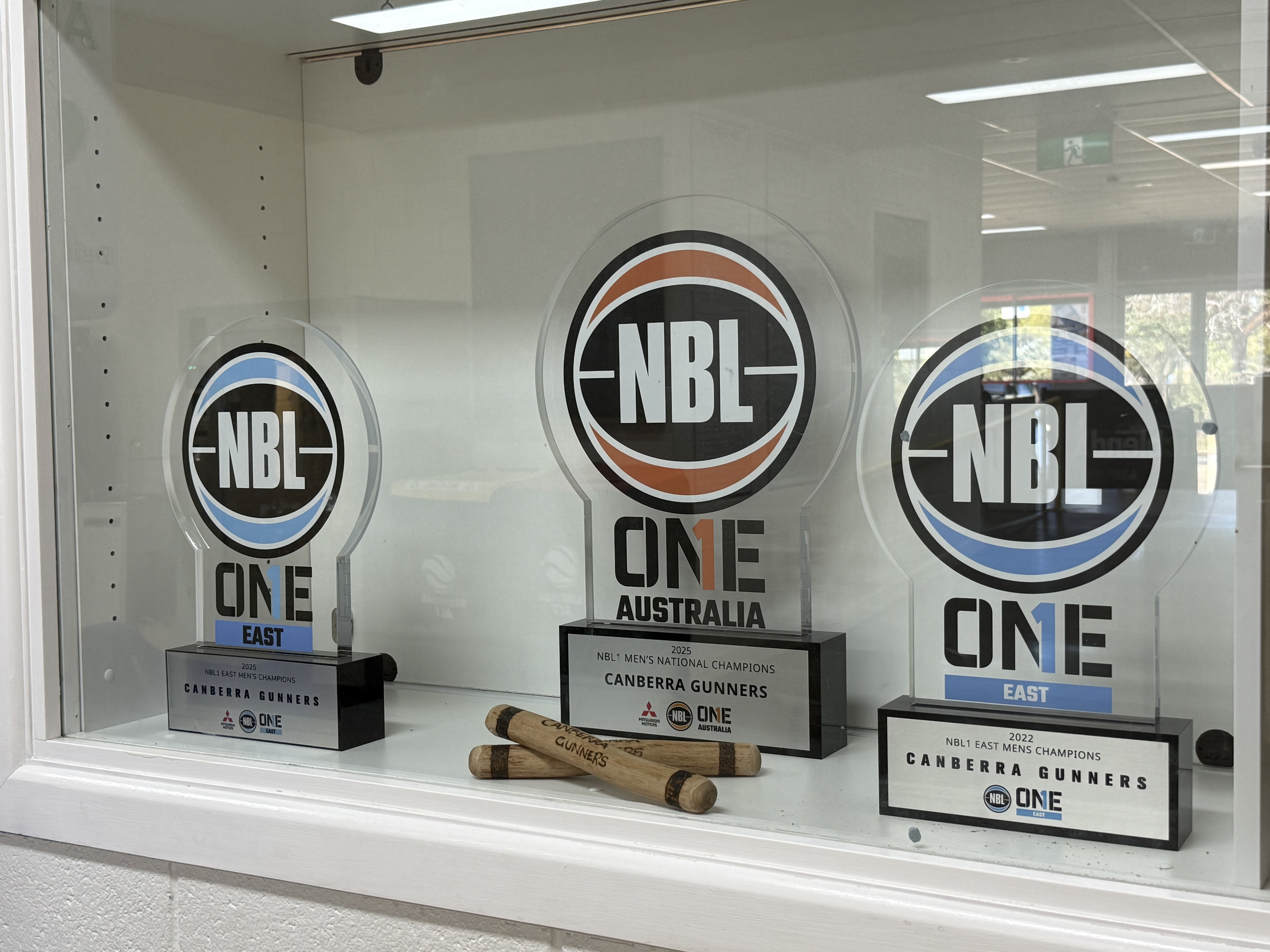
NBL1 trophies – 2022 East (right), 2025 East (left) and 2025 National (centre)

== Stadium ==
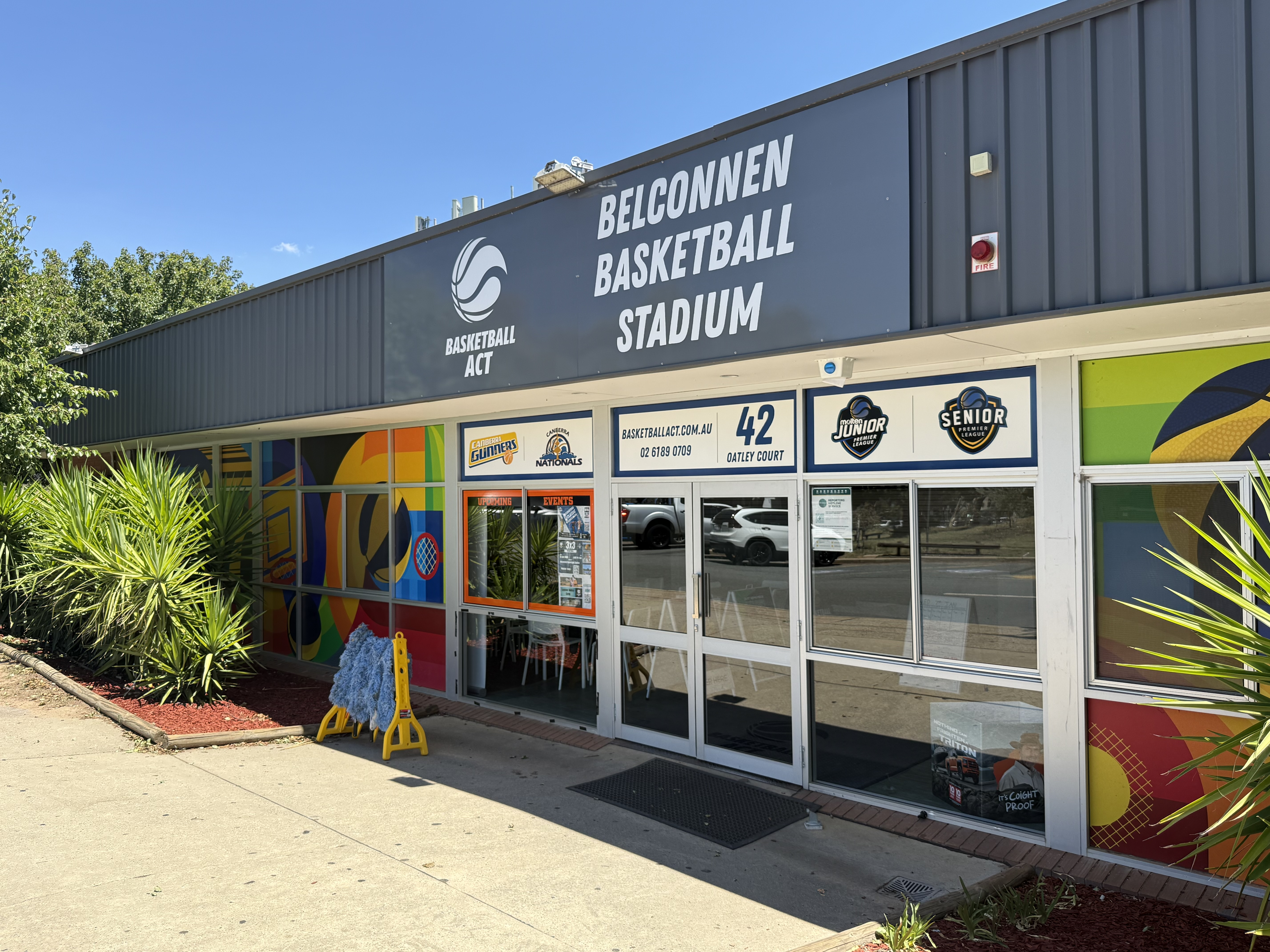
Belconnen Basketball Stadium, January 2026

Basketball ACT is based at Belconnen Basketball Stadium, which was built in 1991. As of 2026, the Gunners and Nationals play their home games at Southern Cross Stadium.
