= Matt Nunn (media executive) =

Australian media executive and former basketball player

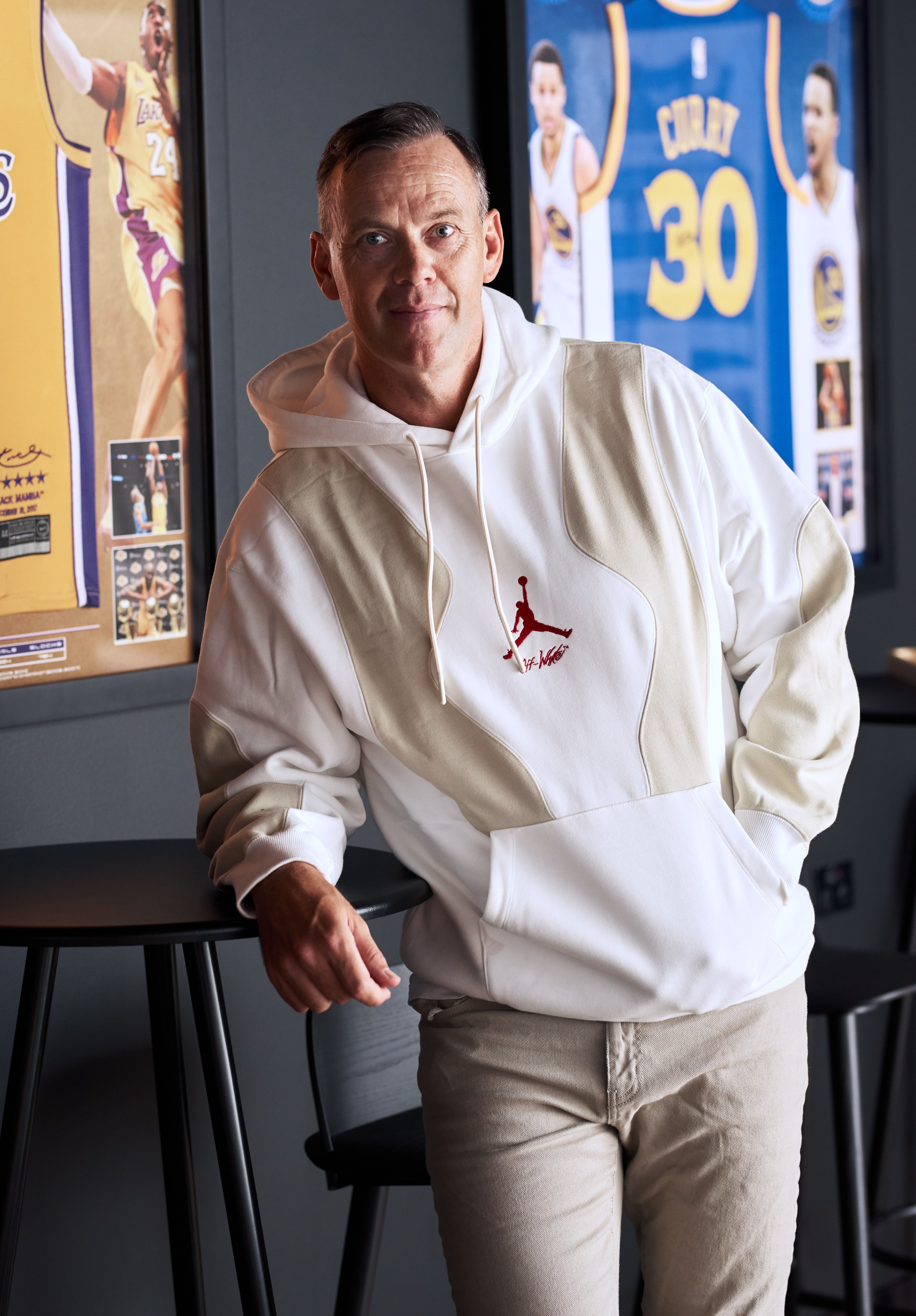
- Nunn in 2022
- Born: 1972 (age 53–54); Ballarat, Victoria, Australia
- Education: Federation University
- Occupations: media executive, basketball player

Matt Nunn is an Australian media executive and former basketball player who set up Nunn Media.

== Early life and education ==
Matt Nunn was born in Ballarat, Victoria, in 1972. He is the second eldest of four children. Nunn attended Ballarat East High School before studying at Federation University, where he graduated with a Bachelor of Education in 1996. He planned to become a physical education teacher.

== Sport career ==
From 1989 to 1998, Nunn played for the Ballarat Miners in the SEABL (now NBL1) senior men's basketball team. During this time, he won three SEABL championships.

In 2020, Matt Nunn served as an Assistant Coach for the Ballarat Miners NBL1 team. In 2021, he took on the role of Head Coach for the U20 Victorian State Team, leading them to a silver medal. Additionally, in 2021, he returned to the Ballarat Miners NBL1 team as an Assistant Coach. In 2022, he again led the U20 Victorian State Team as Head Coach.

In November 2022, Nunn was appointed head coach of the Knox Raiders NBL1 senior men's basketball team. In 2023, he led the team to win the NBL1 National Championship. Nunn also hosts the Building Teams podcast.

In 2024, Matt Nunn received the Lindsay Gaze Award – Coach of the Year from Basketball Victoria.

== Media career ==
In 1998, Nunn transitioned from basketball to media, starting in sales for WIN Television. Later that year, he moved to Melbourne for a media sales position with the Nine Network.

In 2002, Nunn founded Nunn Media with a small team, including his wife, Kim, who served as the accountant. Under his leadership, Nunn Media expanded through several acquisitions, including Kruse Media in 2013, AKA Media in 2014, Innovate Online in 2015, a stake in Local Planet in 2018, and Alley Group in 2021.

Nunn Media has grown into Australia's largest independent media agency, with annual billings exceeding A$500 million, a staff of 200, and a market presence in Australia and the United States. In both 2022 and 2023, he was included in Mediaweek's Agency 50 Power List.

As of 2024, Matt Nunn serves as the managing director of Nunn Media. The agency's notable clients include Spotlight Retail Group, Melbourne Airport, Baker's Delight, Bendigo Bank, JB HiFi, and Levi's.

Since 2018, Nunn also served as the managing director of Local Planet Australia, a global network of independent, owner-managed media agencies.

== Personal life ==
Matt Nunn is married to Kim and has two sons and one daughter.
