= Southern Cross Stadium =

Stadium in Canberra, Australia

- Tuggeranong Stadium
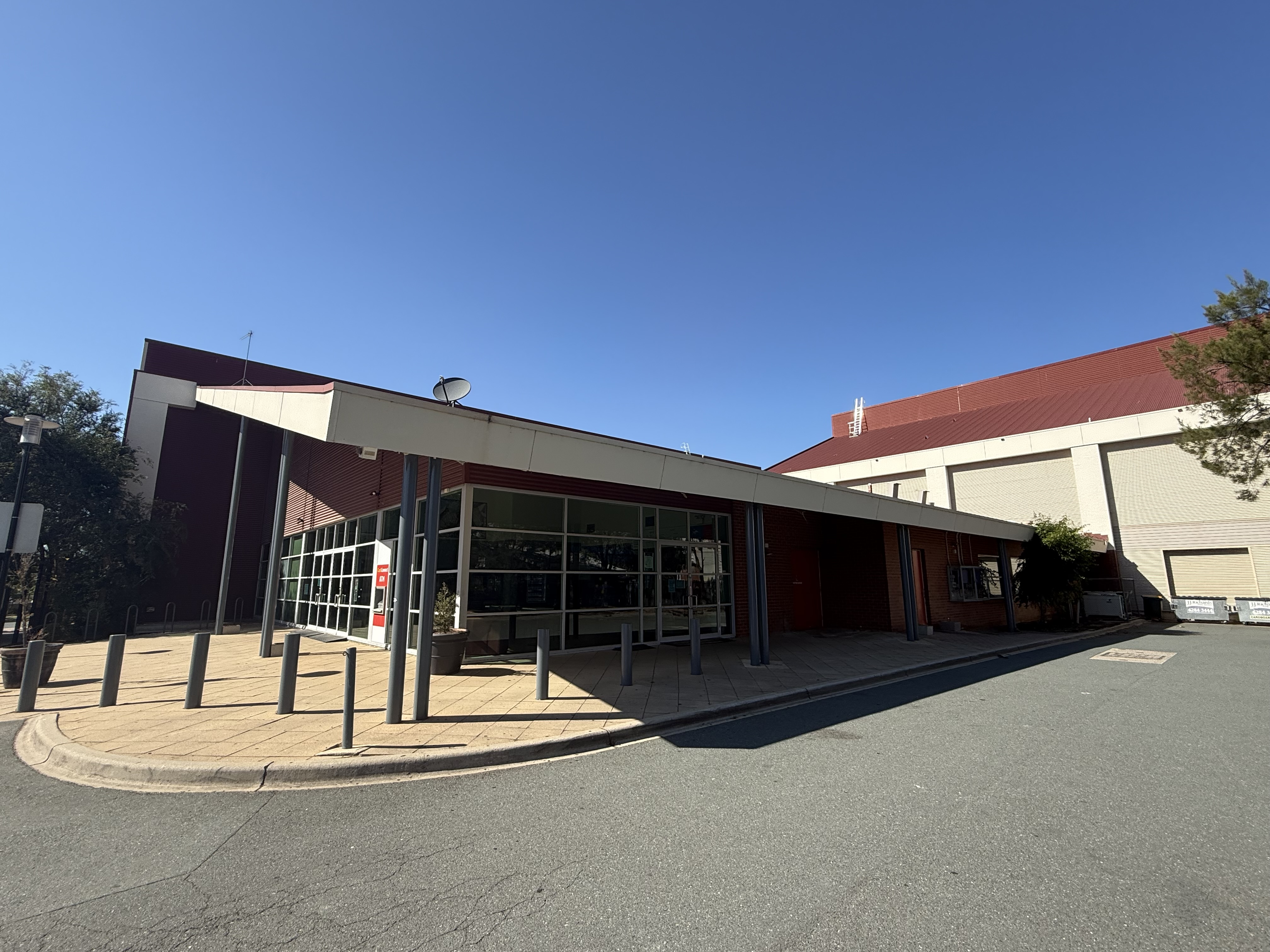
- Southern Cross Stadium, January 2026
- Interactive map of Southern Cross Stadium
- Full name: Southern Cross Basketball Stadium
- Location: Tuggeranong, Australian Capital Territory
- Coordinates: 35°24′53.87″S 149°3′46.59″E
- Owner: Southern Cross Club
- Operator: Southern Cross Club
- Surface: Hardwoods

Tenants
- Canberra Gunners/Canberra Nationals (2026–present); Canberra Roller Derby League

The Southern Cross Stadium is a multi-purpose stadium in Tuggeranong, Australian Capital Territory, primarily used for basketball.

It has served as an alternate venue for the University of Canberra Capitals of the Women's National Basketball League (WNBL) and hosted the 2025 NBL1 National Finals. In 2026, the Canberra Gunners and Canberra Nationals moved their NBL1 East home games to Southern Cross Stadium.

The venue has hosted the Canberra Roller Derby League.
