= Stephanie Gorman =

Australian basketball player (born 2000)

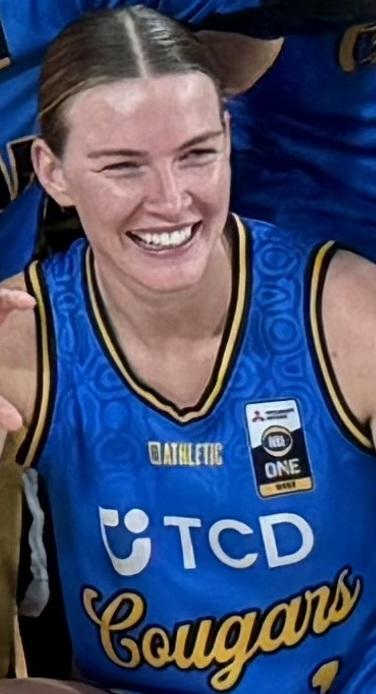
- Gorman with the Cockburn Cougars in 2025

No. 2 – Perth Lynx
- Position: Guard
- League: WNBL

Personal information
- Born: 18 April 2000 (age 26)
- Listed height: 183 cm (6 ft 0 in)

Career information
- High school: Wodonga Senior Secondary College (Wodonga, Victoria)
- College: Utah State (2018–2020); San Diego (2020–2022)
- WNBA draft: 2022: undrafted
- Playing career: 2015–present

Career history
- 2015–2017: Albury Wodonga Bandits
- 2018: Diamond Valley Eagles
- 2022: Ballarat Miners
- 2023–present: Cockburn Cougars
- 2023–present: Perth Lynx

Career highlights
- 2× NBL1 West champion (2023, 2025); NBL1 West Grand Final MVP (2023); All-NBL1 West Second Team (2025); 2× NBL1 West Defensive Player of the Year (2023, 2025); NBL1 West Youth Player of the Year (2024); 2× NBL1 West All-Defensive Team (2024, 2025); NBL1 West All-Youth Team (2024)

Stephanie Gorman (born 18 April 2000) is an Australian professional basketball player for the Perth Lynx of the Women's National Basketball League (WNBL). She is also contracted with the Cockburn Cougars of the NBL1 West. She played college basketball for Utah State and San Diego. In 2023, she debuted for the Perth Lynx in the WNBL. With the Cockburn Cougars, she helped the team win the 2023 NBL1 West championship while earning grand final MVP honours. In 2025, she won her second championship with the Cougars.

== Early life and career ==
Gorman grew up in Wodonga, Victoria, where she attended Wodonga Senior Secondary College and made the Vic Country team in both Under 18s years.

Between 2015 and 2017, Gorman played for the Albury Wodonga Bandits in the South East Australian Basketball League (SEABL). In 2018, she played in the SEABL for the Diamond Valley Eagles.

== College career ==
Gorman played two seasons of college basketball in the United States for the Utah State Aggies between 2018 and 2020. She was named an Academic All-Mountain West Conference Selection and was recognised as a Mountain West Scholar-Athlete in 2018–19. In her sophomore season, she led the team in assists (85), steals (59) and 3-point baskets (68) and ranked third on the squad in scoring (10.7 points per game). She scored a career-high 28 points against Seattle on 9 November 2019. She had a notable game during March Madness in 2020, tallying 17 points, five rebounds, seven assists and a block, including the game-winning assist.

In April 2020, Gorman transferred to San Diego.

Between 2020 and 2022, Gorman played two seasons for the Toreros. She was named an All-Academic honorable mention selection as a junior and averaged 8.9 points per game. As a senior, she was named WCC All-Academic honorable mention and averaged 10.5 points in 31.6 minutes per game. She surpassed 1,000 career points for her collegiate career. She majored in psychology.

== Professional career ==
In June 2022, Gorman signed with the Ballarat Miners of the NBL1 South for the rest of the 2022 season. In 13 games, she averaged 11.9 points, 4.2 rebounds, 2.5 assists and 2.5 steals per game.

Gorman joined the Cockburn Cougars of the NBL1 West for the 2023 season. She helped the Cougars finish the regular season in first place with an 18–2 record and helped the team reach their first ever grand final. In the grand final, Gorman scored a team-high 19 points with five 3-pointers in leading the Cougars to the NBL1 West championship with a 68–61 win over the Willetton Tigers. She was subsequently named grand final MVP. For the season, she was named the league's Defensive Player of the Year, having proved herself a tremendous on-ball lockdown defender. In 23 games, she averaged 15.5 points, 4.6 rebounds, 3.3 assists and 2.5 steals per game.

On 7 June 2023, Gorman signed with the Perth Lynx of the Women's National Basketball League (WNBL) for the 2023–24 season. She was considered a defensive specialist. In mid November, she suffered a strained ligament in her foot. There were initial fears that she could be ruled out for the remainder of the season, but she returned in early December. She helped the Lynx reach the WNBL grand final series, where they lost 2–1 to the Southside Flyers. In 22 games, she averaged 4.1 points, 2.1 rebounds and 1.1 assists per game.

Gorman returned to the Cougars for the 2024 NBL1 West season. She was named the league's Youth Player of the Year along with All-Defensive Team and All-Youth Team. She helped the team return to the NBL1 West grand final, where they lost 97–81 to the Rockingham Flames. Gorman scored 10 points.

On 16 August 2024, Gorman re-signed with the Lynx for the 2024–25 WNBL season. She stepped up in the absence of injured co-captain Amy Atwell early in the season to become one of the WNBL's most damaging three-point shooters while retaining her defensive reputation. On 7 February 2025, she had her the biggest game of her career, recording 19 points with five 3-pointers as well as nine rebounds, five assists and two steals in a 95–77 win over Geelong United.

Gorman re-joined the Cougars for the 2025 NBL1 West season. She was named NBL1 West Defensive Player of the Year for the second time in three years and earned NBL1 West All-Defensive Team honours for the second straight year. She was also named to the All-NBL1 West Second Team. She helped the team reach the NBL1 West Grand Final, where they defeated the Warwick Senators 91–71 to win the championship, with Gorman scoring 12 points.

On 20 June 2025, Gorman re-signed with the Lynx for the 2025–26 WNBL season. She missed the start of the season due to a back injury. After being managed through a back injury all season, Gorman was rested for the Lynx's final regular season game. She helped the Lynx reach the WNBL grand final series, where they lost 2–0 to the Townsville Fire.

Gorman recommitted to the Cougars for the 2026 NBL1 West season, but was replaced early in the season due to injury. She did not appear in a game for the Cougars in 2026.

On 19 May 2026, Gorman re-signed with the Lynx for the 2026–27 WNBL season.

She is set to re-join the Cougars for the 2027 NBL1 West season.

== Personal life ==
Gorman is the daughter of Brendan and Rachel Gorman. She has two younger sisters.
