= Cockburn Cougars =

- Leagues: NBL1 West
- Founded: 1989
- History: Cockburn Cougars; 1989–present
- Arena: Wally Hagan Stadium
- Location: Hamilton Hill, Western Australia
- Team colors: Blue, white, yellow
- CEO: Tia Ucich
- President: Nina Nash
- Vice-president: Cheyne Cameron
- Head coach: M: Matt Parsons; W: Russell Hann
- Championships: 5
- Website: NBL1.com.au

Cockburn Cougars is an NBL1 West club based in Perth, Western Australia. The club fields a team in both the Men's and Women's NBL1 West. The club is a division of Cockburn Basketball Association (CBA), the major administrative basketball organisation in the City of Cockburn. The Cougars play their home games at Wally Hagan Stadium.

== Club history ==
=== Background ===
Cockburn Basketball Association was established in 1972. The association saw success in the 1980s, with the men's team reaching the grand final of the District Competition in 1982 before going on to win their first premiership in 1984. The women's team meanwhile reached four straight grand finals between 1983 and 1986, losing in close encounters all four years.

=== SBL / NBL1 West ===
1989 saw the formation of the State Basketball League (SBL) with both a men's and women's competition. Cockburn, trading as the Cougars, entered a team into both the Men's SBL and Women's SBL. In 1992, the Cougars reached their first MSBL Grand Final and won their first championship with a 107–94 victory over the Souwest Slammers. In 1993, the Cougars made their second straight MSBL Grand Final, where they were defeated 109–91 by the Wanneroo Wolves. In 1998, the Cougars won their first minor premiership with a first-place finish and a 20–4 record. They went on to reach their third MSBL Grand Final, where they were defeated 105–96 by the Slammers.

In 2003, the Cougars finished first in the MSBL's seven-team South Conference with a 16–3 record. They went on to reach their fourth MSBL Grand Final, where they were defeated 76–72 by the Perry Lakes Hawks. Season 2004 saw the men's team claim their third minor premiership with a 21–3 record, while the women's team had their best regular season with a second-place finish and a 17–3 record.

Success eluded the club until 2012, when the Cougars reached their fifth MSBL Grand Final. There they defeated the East Perth Eagles 105–72 behind a grand final MVP performance from import Jeremiah Wilson. In 2016, the Cougars were crowned minor premiers for the fourth time with a first-place finish and a 22–4 record. They went on to reach their sixth MSBL Grand Final, where they defeated the Joondalup Wolves 96–84 behind grand final MVP Rhett Della to win their third championship.

In 2021, the SBL was rebranded as NBL1 West. In 2023, the women's team collected their first ever minor premiership with a first-place finish and an 18–2 record. The 90% winning record marked the best record in club history, men's or women's. They went on to reach their first ever grand final, where they won their maiden championship with a 68–61 win over the Willetton Tigers behind grand final MVP Stephanie Gorman. In 2024, the Cougars women returned to the NBL1 West Grand Final, where they lost 97–81 to the Rockingham Flames.

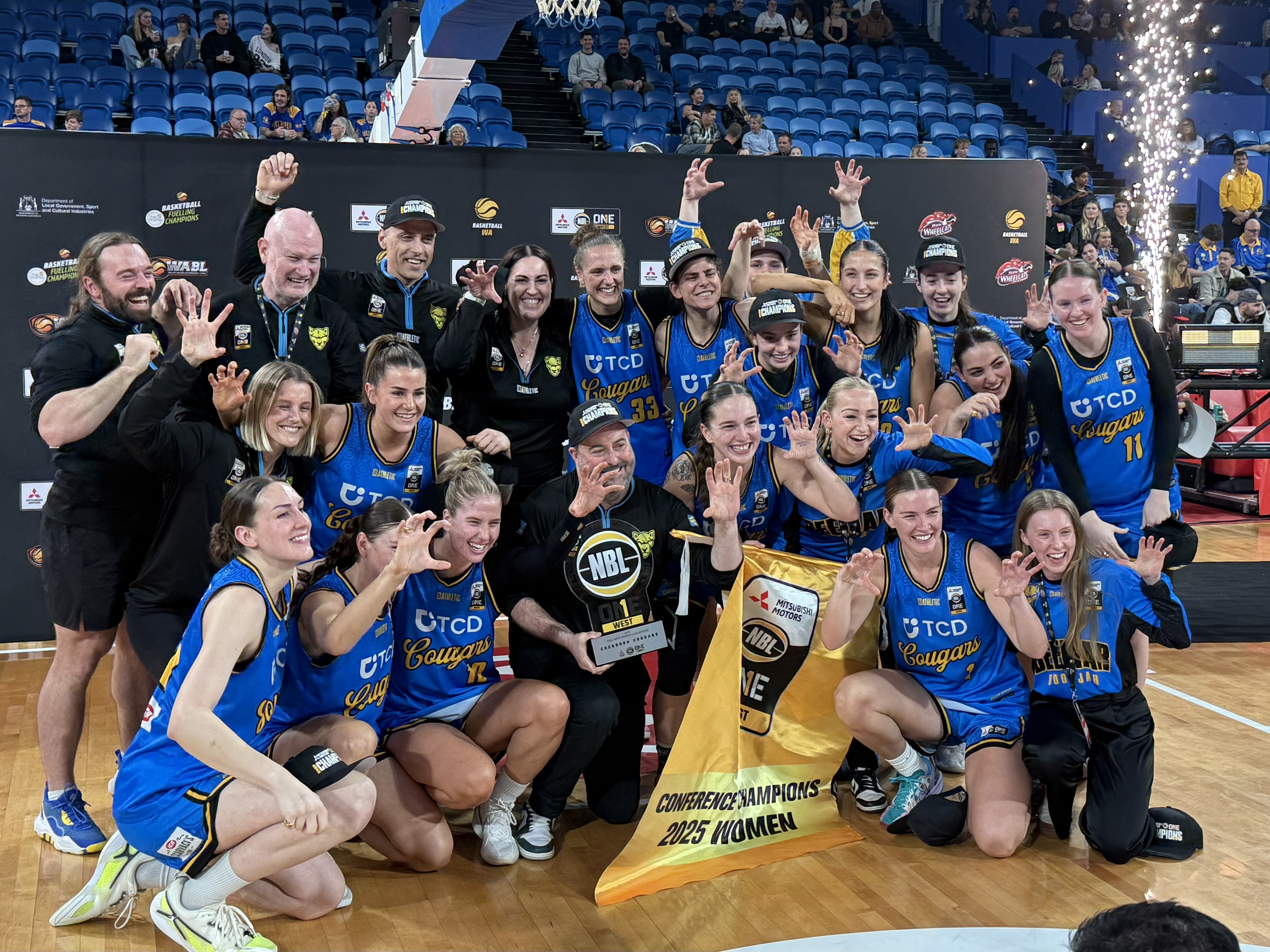
Cockburn Cougars, 2025 NBL1 West women's champions

In 2025, the Cougars women collected the minor premiership with a first-place finish and a 20–0 record, becoming just the third women's team in the history of the SBL / NBL1 West to go undefeated in the regular season. They went on to defeat the Rockingham Flames and Perry Lakes Hawks in the first two rounds of the finals to reach their third straight NBL1 West Grand Final, where they completed their undefeated 23–0 season with a 91–71 win over the Warwick Senators to claim their second championship. At the 2025 NBL1 National Finals, the Cougars won their first two games which saw them reach the championship game, where they lost 93–72 to the Knox Raiders. The loss ended the Cougars' undefeated year.

After winning 23 straight NBL1 West games in 2025, the Cougars women extended that streak to 30 straight wins with a 7–0 record to start the 2026 season. They ended the regular season in top spot for the third time in four years with a 17–3 record, going on to reach their fourth straight NBL1 West Grand Final. In the grand final, the Cougars were defeated 102–76 by the Senators.

== Accolades ==
Women

- Championships: 2 (2023, 2025)
- Grand Final appearances: 4 (2023, 2024, 2025, 2026)
- Minor premierships: 3 (2023, 2025, 2026)

Men

- Championships: 3 (1992, 2012, 2016)
- Grand Final appearances: 6 (1992, 1993, 1998, 2003, 2012, 2016)
- Minor premierships: 4 (1998, 2003, 2004, 2016)
