= Malaysia at the 2018 Commonwealth Games =

- Flag of Malaysia
- CGF code: MAS
- CGA: Olympic Council of Malaysia
- Website: olympic.org.my

in Gold Coast, Australia 4 April 2018 – 15 April 2018
- Competitors: 177 in 16 sports
- Flag bearer: Muhammad Hakimi Ismail (opening)
- Medals Ranked 12th: Gold 7 Silver 5 Bronze 12 Total 24

Commonwealth Games appearances (overview)
- 1950; 1954; 1958; 1962; 1966; 1970; 1974; 1978; 1982; 1986; 1990; 1994; 1998; 2002; 2006; 2010; 2014; 2018; 2022; 2026; 2030

Other related appearances
- British North Borneo (1958, 1962); Sarawak (1958, 1962)

Malaysia competed at the 2018 Commonwealth Games in the Gold Coast, Australia from 4 to 15 April 2018. Squash Racquets Association of Malaysia (SRAM) president Huang Ying How was the chef-de-mission of the delegation.

Track and field athlete Muhammad Hakimi Ismail was the country's flag bearer during the opening ceremony.

== Competitors ==
The following is the list of number of competitors participating at the Games per sport/discipline.

Sport	Men	Women	Total
Athletics	12	2	14
Badminton	5	5	10
Basketball	0	12	12
Cycling	11	3	14
Diving	7	6	13
Gymnastics	2	7	9
Hockey	18	18	36
Lawn bowls	5	5	10
Powerlifting	2	0	2
Rugby sevens	12	0	12
Shooting	6	3	9
Squash	5	4	9
Swimming	5	2	7
Table tennis	4	4	8
Triathlon	1	1	2
Weightlifting	6	4	10
Total	101	76	177

== Medalists ==
Medal	Name	Sport	Event	Date
Gold	Muhammad Azroy Hazalwa	Weightlifting	Men's −56 kg	5 April
Gold	Muhammad Aznil Bidin	Weightlifting	Men's −62 kg	5 April
Gold	Pandelela Rinong; Cheong Jun Hoong	Diving	Women's 10 m synchronised platform	11 April
Gold	Siti Zalina Ahmad; Emma Firyana Saroji	Lawn bowls	Women's Pairs	13 April
Gold	Amy Kwan Dict Weng	Gymnastics	Individual ribbon	13 April
Gold	Lee Chong Wei	Badminton	Men's singles	15 April
Gold	Vivian Hoo Kah Mun; Chow Mei Kuan	Badminton	Women's doubles	15 April
Silver	Chan Peng Soon; Goh V Shem; Chow Mei Kuan; Lee Chong Wei; Goh Liu Ying; Goh Soon Huat; Vivian Hoo Kah Mun; Tan Wee Kiong; Shevon Jemie Lai; Soniia Cheah	Badminton	Mixed Team	9 April
Silver	Jong Yee Khie	Powerlifting	Men's heavyweight	10 April
Silver	Izzah Amzan; Koi Sie Yan; Amy Kwan Dict Weng	Gymnastics	Women's Rhythmic Team	11 April
Silver	Sie Yan Koi	Gymnastics	Individual ball	13 April
Silver	Sie Yan Koi	Gymnastics	Individual clubs	13 April
Bronze	Mohamad Fazrul Azrie	Weightlifting	Men's −85 kg	7 April
Bronze	Nafiizwan Adnan	Squash	Men's singles	9 April
Bronze	Alia Sazana	Shooting	Women's 25m Pistol	10 April
Bronze	Leong Mun Yee; Nur Dhabitah Sabri	Diving	Women's 3 m synchronised springboard	11 April
Bronze	Leong Mun Yee; Nur Dhabitah Sabri	Diving	Women's 10 m synchronised platform	11 April
Bronze	Amy Kwan Dict Weng	Gymnastics	Individual Rhythmic All-around	12 April
Bronze	Afiq Ali Hanafiah	Athletics	Men's 100m T12	12 April
Bronze	Amy Kwan Dict Weng	Gymnastics	Individual hoop	13 April
Bronze	Koi Sie Yan	Gymnastics	Individual ribbon	13 April
Bronze	Ho Ying; Karen Lyne	Table tennis	Women's doubles	13 April
Bronze	Goh V Shem; Tan Wee Kiong	Badminton	Men's doubles	14 April
Bronze	Chan Peng Soon; Goh Liu Ying	Badminton	Mixed doubles	14 April

== Athletics ==
Men
Track & road events

Athlete	Event	Heat		Semifinal		Final	
Athlete	Event	Result	Rank	Result	Rank	Result	Rank
Khairul Hafiz Jantan	100 m	10.50	27	did not advance			
Afiq Ali Hanafiah	100m T12	11.20	2 q	—N/a		11.28	3rd place, bronze medalist(s)
Rayzam Shah Wan Sofian	110 m hurdles	14.03	12	—N/a		did not advance	
Badrul Hisham Abdul Manap; Khairul Hafiz Jantan; Nixson Anak Kennedy; Jonathan Nyepa	4 × 100 m	39.39	7 q	—N/a		39.37	7

Field events

Athlete	Event	Qualification		Final	
Athlete	Event	Distance	Rank	Distance	Rank
Muhammad Hakimi Ismail	Triple jump	16.36	3 q	15.97	9
Hup Wei Lee	High jump	2.21	7 Q	2.21	8
Nauraj Singh Randhawa	High jump	2.21	13 Q	2.18	10
Iskandar Alwi	Pole vault	—N/a		5.00	8
Muhammad Irfan Shamshuddin	Discus throw	NM		did not advance	
Jackie Siew Cheer Wong	Hammer throw	—N/a		64.35	14

Women
Track & road events

Athlete	Event	Heat		Semifinal		Final	
Athlete	Event	Result	Rank	Result	Rank	Result	Rank
Zaidatul Husniah Zulkifli	100 m	11.64	17 Q	11.84	20	did not advance	

Field events

Athlete	Event	Final	
Athlete	Event	Distance	Rank
Yu Tian Chuah	Pole vault	3.70	13

- Q: Qualified by Place
- q: Qualified by Time
- NM: No Mark

== Badminton ==
Malaysia badminton team consisted of ten athletes (five male and five female).

Individual

Athlete	Event	Round of 64	Round of 32	Round of 16	Quarterfinals	Semifinals	Final	Rank
Athlete	Event	Opposition Score	Opposition Score	Opposition Score	Opposition Score	Opposition Score	Opposition Score	Rank
Lee Chong Wei	Men's singles	Bye	Li (IOM); W 2-0	Kasirye (UGA); W 2-0	Loh (SGP); W 2-0	Prannoy (IND); W 2-1	Gold Medal Match; Kidambi (IND); W 2-1	1st place, gold medalist(s)
Soniia Cheah	Women's singles	Bye	Darragh (NIR); W 2-0	Chua (SGP); W 2-0	Li (CAN); L 0-2	did not advance		

Doubles

Athlete	Event	Round of 64	Round of 32	Round of 16	Quarterfinals	Semifinals	Final	Rank
Athlete	Event	Opposition Score	Opposition Score	Opposition Score	Opposition Score	Opposition Score	Opposition Score	Rank
Goh V Shem; Tan Wee Kiong	Men's doubles	—N/a	Bye	Donkor (GHA); Sam (GHA); W 2-0	Dunn (SCO); Hall (SCO); W 2-0	Ellis (ENG); Langridge (ENG); L 1-2	Bronze Medal Match; Dias (SRI); Goonethilleka (SRI); W 2-0	3rd place, bronze medalist(s)
Chan Peng Soon; Goh Soon Huat	Men's doubles	—N/a	Bonkowsky (TTO); Mohammed (TTO); W 2-0	Adcock (ENG); Lane (ENG); W 2-1	Rankireddy (IND); Shetty (IND); L 1-2	did not advance		
Chow Mei Kuan; Vivian Hoo	Women's doubles	—N/a	E Siamupangila (ZAM); O Siamupangila (ZAM); W 2-0	Honderich (CAN); Tsai (CAN); W 2-0	Birch (ENG); Pugh (ENG); W 2-0	Reddy (IND); Ponnappa (IND); W 2-1	Gold Medal Match; Smith (ENG); Walker (ENG); W 2-0	1st place, gold medalist(s)
Soniia Cheah; Shevon Jemie Lai	Women's doubles	—N/a	Atipaka (GHA); Mensah (GHA); W 2-0	Chambers (NIR); Darragh (NIR); W 2-0	Mapasa (AUS); Somerville (AUS); L 0-2	did not advance		
Chan Peng Soon; Goh Liu Ying	Mixed doubles	Bye	Paul (MRI); Allet (MRI); W 2-0	Dunn (SCO); O'Donnell (SCO); W 2-0	Chopra (IND); Reddy (IND); W 2-0	G Adcock (ENG); C Adcock (ENG); L 0-2	Bronze Medal Match; Rankireddy (IND); Ponnappa (IND); W 2-0	3rd place, bronze medalist(s)
Goh Soon Huat; Shevon Jemie Lai	Mixed doubles	Bye	C Chambers (NIR); S Chambers (NIR); W 2-0	Donkor (GHA); Amash (GHA); W 2-0	Rankireddy (IND); Ponnappa (IND); L 0-2	did not advance		

Mixed team

Roster

- Chan Peng Soon
- Soniia Cheah
- Chow Mei Kuan
- Goh Liu Ying
- Goh Soon Huat
- Goh V Shem
- Vivian Hoo
- Shevon Jemie Lai
- Lee Chong Wei
- Tan Wee Kiong

Pool D

Pos	Team	Pld	W	L	MF	MA	MD	GF	GA	GD	PF	PA	PD	Pts	Qualification
1	Malaysia	2	2	0	9	1	+8	19	2	+17	433	202	+231	2	Knockout stage
2	Canada	2	1	1	6	4	+2	12	9	+3	358	328	+30	1	Knockout stage
3	Ghana	2	0	2	0	10	−10	0	20	−20	159	420	−261	0	
4	Seychelles DSQ	0	0	0	0	0	0	0	0	0	0	0	0	0	

Updated to match(es) played on 6 April 2018. Source:

Malaysia
5
Carrara Sports and Leisure Centre, Gold Coast
5 April

Ghana
0

			1	2	3
1	(Malaysia) (Ghana)	Goh V Shem / Tan Wee Kiong; Abraham Ayittey / Micheal Opoku Baah	21; 8	21; 11
2	(Malaysia) (Ghana)	Soniia Cheah; Stella Koteikai Amasah	21; 3	21; 5
3	(Malaysia) (Ghana)	Lee Chong Wei; Daniel Sam	21; 2	21; 7
4	(Malaysia) (Ghana)	Vivian Hoo / Chow Mei Kuan; Grace Atipaka / Eyram Migbodzi	21; 2	21; 3
5	(Malaysia) (Ghana)	Chan Peng Soon / Goh Liu Ying; Emmanuel Donkor / Gifty Mensah	21; 7	21; 6

Malaysia
5
Carrara Sports and Leisure Centre, Gold Coast
6 April

Seychelles
0

			1	2	3
1	(Malaysia) (Seychelles)	Goh Soon Huat; Kervin Ghislain	21; 10	21; 5
2	(Malaysia) (Seychelles)	Soniia Cheah; Juliette Ah-Wan				w/o
3	(Malaysia) (Seychelles)	Tan Wee Kiong / Goh V Shem; Kervin Ghislain / Steve Malcouzane	21; 14	21; 12
4	(Malaysia) (Seychelles)	Vivian Hoo / Chow Mei Kuan; Juliette Ah-Wan / Allisen Camille				w/o
5	(Malaysia) (Seychelles)	Goh Soon Huat / Shevon Jemie Lai; Steve Malcouzane / Allisen Camille	21; 8	21; 4

Malaysia
4
Carrara Sports and Leisure Centre, Gold Coast
6 April

Canada
1

			1	2	3
1	(Malaysia) (Canada)	Goh Soon Huat / Shevon Jemie Lai; Nyl Yakura / Kristen Tsai	21; 17	21; 12
2	(Malaysia) (Canada)	Lee Chong Wei; Jason Ho-Shue	21; 6	21; 5
3	(Malaysia) (Canada)	Soniia Cheah; Michelle Li	21; 14	19; 21	15; 21
4	(Malaysia) (Canada)	Goh V Shem / Tan Wee Kiong; Jason Ho-Shue / Nyl Yakura	21; 14	21; 13
5	(Malaysia) (Canada)	Vivian Hoo / Chow Mei Kuan; Rachel Honderich / Kristen Tsai	21; 16	21; 9

Quarterfinal

Scotland
0
Carrara Sports and Leisure Centre, Gold Coast
7 April

Malaysia
3

			1	2	3
1	(Scotland) (Malaysia)	Adam Hall / Julie MacPherson; Chan Peng Soon / Goh Liu Ying	21; 14	18; 21	15; 21
2	(Scotland) (Malaysia)	Kieran Merrilees; Lee Chong Wei	14; 21	7; 21
3	(Scotland) (Malaysia)	Alexander Dunn / Adam Hall; Goh V Shem / Tan Wee Kiong	10; 21	15; 21
4	(Scotland) (Malaysia)	Kirsty Gilmour; Soniia Cheah				not played
5	(Scotland) (Malaysia)	Eleanor O'Donnell / Julie MacPherson; Vivian Hoo / Chow Mei Kuan				not played

Semifinal

England
0
Carrara Sports and Leisure Centre, Gold Coast
8 April

Malaysia
3

			1	2	3
1	(England) (Malaysia)	Chris Langridge / Marcus Ellis; Goh V Shem / Tan Wee Kiong	9; 21	11; 21
2	(England) (Malaysia)	Chloe Birch; Soniia Cheah	17; 21	21; 15	18; 21
3	(England) (Malaysia)	Rajiv Ouseph; Lee Chong Wei	18; 21	16; 21
4	(England) (Malaysia)	Lauren Smith / Sarah Walker; Vivian Hoo / Chow Mei Kuan				not played
5	(England) (Malaysia)	Chris Adcock / Gabby Adcock; Chan Peng Soon / Goh Liu Ying				not played

Final

India
3
Carrara Sports and Leisure Centre, Gold Coast
9 April

Malaysia
1

			1	2	3
1	(India) (Malaysia)	Satwiksairaj Rankireddy / Ashwini Ponnappa; Chan Peng Soon / Goh Liu Ying	21; 14	15; 21	21; 15
2	(India) (Malaysia)	Srikanth Kidambi; Lee Chong Wei	21; 17	21; 14
3	(India) (Malaysia)	Satwiksairaj Rankireddy / Chirag Shetty; Goh V Shem / Tan Wee Kiong	15; 21	20; 22
4	(India) (Malaysia)	Saina Nehwal; Soniia Cheah	21; 11	19; 21	21; 9
5	(India) (Malaysia)	N. Sikki Reddy / Ashwini Ponnappa; Vivian Hoo / Chow Mei Kuan				not played

== Basketball ==
Malaysia qualified a women's basketball team of 12 athletes. The team was invited by FIBA and the CGF.

=== Women's tournament ===
Roster

The following is the Malaysia roster in the women's basketball tournament of the 2018 Commonwealth Games.

Malaysia women's national basketball team - 2018 Commonwealth Games roster
Players
Coaches

Pos.	No.	Name	Age – Date of birth	Height	Club	Ctr.
F	1	Hui Pin Pang	27 – 29 April 1990	1.76 m (5 ft 9 in)	Segamat BA	(Malaysia)
G	5	Yin Yin Chong	24 – 26 June 1993	1.66 m (5 ft 5 in)	Megainn Selangor	(Malaysia)
G	6	Wei Yin Saw	26 – 2 March 1992	1.66 m (5 ft 5 in)	Megainn Selangor	(Malaysia)
G	7	Nur Izzati Yaakob	28 – 16 November 1989	1.63 m (5 ft 4 in)	KL Binapuri	(Malaysia)
F	8	Poh Yee Ooi	25 – 12 March 1993	1.75 m (5 ft 9 in)	Megainn Selangor	(Malaysia)
F	10	Chia Qian Tai	21 – 15 June 1996	1.70 m (5 ft 7 in)	Melaka 906 Warrior	(Malaysia)
G	11	Phey Chyi Low	24 – 29 March 1994	1.68 m (5 ft 6 in)	Segamat BA	(Malaysia)
C	12	Kalaimathi Rajintiran	27 – 2 September 1990	1.85 m (6 ft 1 in)	Segamat BA	(Malaysia)
F	20	Yu Feng Ng	20 – 7 June 1997	1.68 m (5 ft 6 in)	Segamat BA	(Malaysia)
C	22	Ky Lie Hiew	20 – 22 March 1998	1.78 m (5 ft 10 in)	Megainn Selangor	(Malaysia)
F	35	Fook Yee Yap	24 – 15 June 1993	1.74 m (5 ft 9 in)	KL Binapuri	(Malaysia)
C	72	Chiau Teng Ting	26 – 10 March 1992	1.80 m (5 ft 11 in)	KL Binapuri	(Malaysia)

Head coach

- (Malaysia) Sze Yuin Yoong

Assistant coach(es)

- (Malaysia) Weng Honn Kan
- (Malaysia) Choo Seck Yun

Legend

- (C) Team captain
- Club - describes last
  club before the tournament
- Age - describes age
  on 5 April 2018

Pool B

Pos	Team	Pld	W	L	PF	PA	PD	Pts	Qualification
1	New Zealand	3	3	0	256	148	+108	6	Qualifying finals
2	Jamaica	3	2	1	196	195	+1	5	Qualifying finals
3	Malaysia	3	1	2	187	239	−52	4	
4	India	3	0	3	184	241	−57	3	

Source: GC2018
Rules for classification: 1) Points; 2) Head-to-head results; 3) Points difference; 4) Points scored.

5 April 2018
21:00

Boxscore

New Zealand	86–44	Malaysia
Scoring by quarter: 24–10, 27–15, 15–3, 20–16
Pts: Cocks 15; Rebs: Purcell 12; Asts: Hunter 6		Pts: Yap 12; Rebs: Pang 7 Asts: Pang 5

Cairns Convention Centre, Cairns
Referees: James Boyer (AUS), Sarah Carey (AUS), Kate Webb (ENG)

7 April 2018
18:30

Boxscore

Malaysia	85–72	India
Scoring by quarter: 20–25, 28–12, 11–18, 26–17
Pts: Yap 18; Rebs: Ting 6 Asts: Saw 6		Pts: Skaria 19; Rebs: Skaria 13; Asts: Sonkar 4

Cairns Convention Centre, Cairns
Referees: Viola Gyorgyi (NOR), Sarah Carey (AUS), Kate Webb (ENG)

8 April 2018
20:00

Boxscore

Jamaica	81–58	Malaysia
Scoring by quarter: 21–21, 19–9, 17–17, 24–11
Pts: George 25; Rebs: George 20; Asts: three players 4		Pts: Ting 17; Rebs: Kalaimathi, Ting 6 Asts: Nur Izzati 5

Cairns Convention Centre, Cairns
Referees: Arnauld Kom Njilo (CMR), Sarah Carey (AUS), Kate Webb (ENG)

== Cycling ==
Malaysia participated with 14 athletes (11 men and 3 women).

=== Track ===
Sprint

Athlete	Event	Qualification		Round 1	Quarterfinals	Semifinals	Final/Bronze Medal Match	
Athlete	Event	Time	Rank	Opposition Time	Opposition Time	Opposition Time	Opposition Time	Rank
Muhammad Alif Fahmy Khairul Anuar	Men's sprint	10.183	17	did not advance				
Mohamad Shariz Efendi Mohd Shahrin	Men's sprint	10.692	23	did not advance				
Muhammad Shah Firdaus Sahrom	Men's sprint	10.013	16	M Glaetzer (AUS); W10.696	L Oliva (WAL); W 10.076; 10.312	S Webster (NZL); L	Bronze Medal Match; J Schmid (AUS); L	4
Muhammad Alif Fahmy Khairul Anuar; Muhammad Khairil Rasol; Muhammad Shah Firdaus Sahrom	Men's team sprint	44.760	5	—N/a			did not advance	
Muhammad Afiq Afify Rizan; Muhammad Khairil Rasol (pilot)	Men's tandem sprint B	10.037	4	—N/a		James Ball; Peter Mitchell (pilot) (WAL); L	Bronze Medal Match; Brad Henderson; Tom Clarke (pilot) (AUS); L	4
Farina Shawati Mohd Adnan	Women's sprint	11.585	15	L Genest (CAN); L 11.503	did not advance			
Fatehah Mustapa	Women's sprint	11.142	11	R James (WAL); W 11.514	N Hansen (NZL); L 11.242; 11.670	did not advance		
Farina Shawati Mohd Adnan; Fatehah Mustapa; Ju Pha Som Net	Women's team sprint	34.826	5	—N/a			did not advance	

Keirin

Athlete	Event	Round 1	Repechage	Semifinals	Final
Mohd Azizulhasni Awang	Men's keirin	P Constable (AUS); L Browne (TTO); C Skinner (SCO); H Barrette (CAN); S Kumar (IND) 2 Q	—N/a	M Glaetzer (AUS); L Oliva (WAL); J Truman (ENG); H Barrette (CAN); J Schmid (AUS) 2 Q	1st – 6th classification M Glaetzer (AUS); L Oliva (WAL); S Webster (NZL); E Dawkins (NZL); J Carlin (SCO) 6
Muhammad Shah Firdaus Sahrom	Men's keirin	M Glaetzer (AUS); S Ritter (CAN); P Hindes (ENG); R Singh (IND); B Knipe (NZL) 4	L Oliva (WAL); N Phillip (TTO); C Skinner (SCO) 3	did not advance	
Muhammad Alif Fahmy Khairul Anuar	Men's keirin	J Carlin (SCO); J Schmid (AUS); E Dawkins (NZL); R Owens (ENG); N Phillip (TTO) 5	E Dawkins (NZL); S Kumar (IND); P St-Louis Pivin (CAN) 2	did not advance	
Farina Shawati Mohd Adnan	Women's keirin	N Hansen (NZL); R Stewart (NIR); L Bate (ENG); A Reji (IND); 4	O Podmore (NZL); A Amelia Walsh (CAN); E Coster (WAL); D Deborah (IND); 2 Q	K McCulloch (AUS); N Hansen (NZL); E Cumming (NZL); L Genest (CAN); L Bate (ENG); 3 Q	1st – 6th classification S Morton (AUS); K McCulloch (AUS); N Hansen (NZL); A Amelia Walsh (CAN); O Podmore (NZL) 4
Fatehah Mustapa	Women's keirin	K McCulloch (AUS); E Cumming (NZL); R James (WAL); A Amelia Walsh (CAN); Katy Marchant (ENG)DNF; 1 Q	—N/a	S Morton (AUS); O Podmore (NZL); A Amelia Walsh (CAN); R Stewart (NIR); R James (WAL); REL Q	7th – 12th classification L Genest (CAN); R James (WAL); L Bate (ENG); E Cumming (NZL); R Stewart (NIR); 8

Time trial

Athlete	Event	Time	Rank
Muhammad Alif Fahmy Khairul Anuar	Men's time trial	57.996	11
Muhammad Afiq Afify Rizan; Muhammad Khairil Rasol (pilot)	Men's tandem time trial B	1:03.249	4
Fatehah Mustapa	Women's time trial	51.585	8

Pursuit

Athlete	Event	Qualification		Final	
Athlete	Event	Time	Rank	Opponent Results	Rank
Muhammad Danieal Edy Suhaidee	Men's pursuit	4:39.502	23	did not advance	
Eiman Firdaus Mohd Zamri	Men's pursuit	4:43.211	25	did not advance	
Muhammad Nur Aiman Rosli	Men's pursuit	4:45.314	27	did not advance	
Muhammad Danieal Edy Suhaidee; Irwandie Lakasek; Eiman Firdaus Mohd Zamri; Muhamad Afiq Huznie Othman; Muhammad Nur Aiman Rosli	Men's team pursuit	4:13.033	6	Did not advance	

Points race

Athlete	Event	Qualification		Final	
Athlete	Event	Points	Rank	Points	Rank
Muhammad Danieal Edy Suhaidee	Men's point race	20	Q	2	15
Muhamad Afiq Huznie Othman	Men's point race	3	Q	1	17
Muhammad Nur Aiman Rosli	Men's point race	DNF		did not advance	
Ju Pha Som Net	Women's points race	—N/a		0	20

Scratch race

Athlete	Event	Qualification	Final
Irwandie Lakasek	Men's scratch race	DNF	Did not advance
Eiman Firdaus Mohd Zamri	Men's scratch race	11 Q	DNF
Muhamad Afiq Huznie Othman	Men's scratch race	13	Did not advance
Ju Pha Som Net	Women's scratch race	—N/a	13

== Diving ==
Malaysia participated with a team of 13 athletes (7 men and 6 women).

Men

Athlete	Event	Preliminaries		Final	
Athlete	Event	Points	Rank	Points	Rank
Ahmad Amsyar Azman	1 m springboard	343.75	7 Q	369.40	6
Ooi Tze Liang	1 m springboard	302.30	10 Q	319.00	11
Muhammad Syafiq Puteh	1 m springboard	306.80	8 Q	378.90	5
Ahmad Amsyar Azman	3 m springboard	325.15	16	did not advance	
Chew Yi Wei	3 m springboard	391.75	6 Q	347.20	11
Ooi Tze Liang	3 m springboard	370.10	9 Q	373.75	10
Chew Yi Wei	10 m platform	382.55	6 Q	362.10	9
Gabriel Daim; Muhammad Syafiq Puteh	3 m synchronised springboard	—N/a		369.42	7
Chew Yi Wei; Ooi Tze Liang	3 m synchronised springboard	—N/a		395.40	4
Jellson Jabillin; Hanis Jaya Surya	10 m synchronised platform	—N/a		385.80	4

Women

Athlete	Event	Preliminaries		Final	
Athlete	Event	Points	Rank	Points	Rank
Kimberly Bong	1 m springboard	213.95	12 Q	220.25	9
Jasmine Lai Pui Yee	1 m springboard	249.20	8 Q	223.20	8
Nur Dhabitah Sabri	1 m springboard	258.60	7 Q	235.80	6
Kimberly Bong	3 m springboard	223.75	12 Q	270.10	10
Jasmine Lai Pui Yee	3 m springboard	202.80	15	did not advance	
Nur Dhabitah Sabri	3 m springboard	243.30	9 Q	264.90	11
Kimberly Bong	10 m platform	204.20	12 Q	294.20	10
Cheong Jun Hoong	10 m platform	330.10	2 Q	332.85	5
Pandelela Rinong Pamg	10 m platform	339.00	1 Q	340.20	4
Leong Mun Yee; Nur Dhabitah Sabri	3 m synchronised springboard	—N/a		264.90	3rd place, bronze medalist(s)
Leong Mun Yee; Nur Dhabitah Sabri	10 m synchronised platform	—N/a		308.16	3rd place, bronze medalist(s)
Cheong Jun Hoong; Pandelela Rinong Pamg	10 m synchronised platform	—N/a		328.08	1st place, gold medalist(s)

== Hockey ==
=== Men's tournament ===
Roster

- Norsyafiq Sumantri
- Muhamad Ramadan Rosli
- Mohd Fitri Saari
- Joel Samuel van Huizen
- Faizal Saari
- Syed Mohamad Syafiq Syed Cholan
- Mohamad Sukri Abdul Mutalib
- Muhammad Firhan Ashari
- Muhammad Amirol Aideed Mohd Arshad
- Nabil Fiqri Mohd Noor
- Muhammad Razie Abd Rahim
- Muhammad Azri Hassan
- Meor Muhamad Azuan Hassan
- Muhammad Hafizuddin Othman
- Tengku Ahmad Tajuddin Tengku Abdul Jalil
- Muhammad Najmi Farizal Jazlan
- Muhammad Shahril Saabah
- Muhammad Hairi Abd Rahman

Pool B

Pos	Team	Pld	W	D	L	GF	GA	GD	Pts	Qualification
1	India	4	3	1	0	12	9	+3	10	Advance to Semi-finals
2	England	4	2	1	1	15	8	+7	7	Advance to Semi-finals
3	Malaysia	4	1	1	2	5	10	−5	4	5th–6th place match
4	Pakistan	4	0	4	0	6	6	0	4	7th–8th place match
5	Wales	4	0	1	3	6	11	−5	1	9th–10th place match

Source: FIH
Rules for classification: 1) points; 2) number of wins; 3) goal difference; 4) goals scored; 5) head-to-head results.

6 April 2018
09:30

England	7–0	Malaysia
Ward 14', 20'; Goodfield 21'; Gleghorne 27', 53'; Martin 49'; Roper 59'	Report

Umpires:
Tim Bond (NZL)
Ben de Young (AUS)

7 April 2018
09:30

Malaysia	3–0	Wales
Fitri 19' van Huizen 36'; Faizal 55'	Report

Umpires:
Tim Bond (NZL)
Sean Rapaport (RSA)

10 April 2018
09:30

India	2–1	Malaysia
H. Singh 3', 44'	Report	Saari 16'

Umpires:
Lim Hong Zhen (SGP)
Tyler Klenk (CAN)

11 April 2018
14:30

Malaysia	1–1	Pakistan
Ramadan 39'	Report	Shafqat 9'

Umpires:
Paul Walker (ENG)
Tyler Klenk (CAN)

Fifth and sixth place

13 April 2018
16:15

Scotland	1–2	Malaysia
Forsyth 11'	Report	Shahril 21'; Amirol 39'

Umpires:
Deepak Joshi (IND)
Paul Walker (ENG)

=== Women's tournament ===
Roster

- Farah Ayuni Yahya
- Nuraini Abdul Rashid
- Nuraslinda Said
- Nurul Nabihah Mansur
- Raja Norsharina Raja Shabuddin
- Siti Noor Amarina Ruhani
- Juliani Mohamad Din
- Norbaini Hashim
- Norazlin Sumantri
- Hanis Nadiah Onn
- Surizan Awang Noh
- Nur Syafiqah Mohd Zain
- Mas Huzaimah Md Aziz
- Siti Rahmah Othman
- Fazilla Sylvester Silin
- Wan Norfaiezah Md Saiuti
- Fatin Shafika Mohd Sukri
- Nuramirah Shakirah Zulkifli

Pool A

Pos	Team	Pld	W	D	L	GF	GA	GD	Pts	Qualification
1	England	4	3	0	1	11	3	+8	9	Advance to Semi-finals
2	India	4	3	0	1	9	5	+4	9	Advance to Semi-finals
3	South Africa	4	1	1	2	3	4	−1	4	5th–6th place match
4	Malaysia	4	1	1	2	3	8	−5	4	7th–8th place match
5	Wales	4	1	0	3	4	10	−6	3	9th–10th place match

Source: FIH
Rules for classification: 1) points; 2) number of wins; 3) goal difference; 4) goals scored; 5) head-to-head results.

6 April 2018
14:30

India	4–1	Malaysia
G. Kaur 6', 39'; Rampal 56'; Lalremsiami 59'	Report	Nuraini 38'

Umpires:
Emma Shelbourn (GBR)
Cookie Tan (SGP)

7 April 2018
19:30

South Africa	1–1	Malaysia
Mayne 47'	Report	Nuraslinda 39'

Umpires:
Catherine Wright (WAL)
Lelia Sacre (CAN)

9 April 2018
19:30

England	3–0	Malaysia
Watton 7'; Martin 35'; Bray 53'	Report

Umpires:
Lelia Sacre (CAN)
Wanri Venter (RSA)

11 April 2018
09:30

Malaysia	1–0	Wales
Hanis 23'	Report

Umpires:
Ayanna McClean (TTO)
Cookie Tan (SGP)

Seventh and eighth place

12 April 2018
15:45

Malaysia	2–4	Scotland
Fatin 31'; Nuraini 40'	Report	Brown 5'; Brodie 22', 27'; Lanigan 51'

Umpires:
Jo Cumming (NZL)
Wanri Venter (RSA)

== Gymnastics ==
=== Artistic ===
Malaysia participated with 6 athletes (2 men and 4 women).

Men
Individual Qualification

Athlete	Event	Apparatus						Total	Rank
Athlete	Event	F	PH	R	V	PB	HB	Total	Rank
Loo Phay Xing	Qualification	13.250	13.800 Q	11.750	13.000	11.250	12.800	75.850	18 Q
Tan Fu Jie	Qualification	12.050	11.400	—N/a				—N/a	

Individual Finals

Athlete	Event	Apparatus						Total	Rank
Athlete	Event	F	PH	R	V	PB	HB	Total	Rank
Loo Phay Xing	All-around	11.400	12.600	11.700	13.400	11.900	12.250	73.250	17
Loo Phay Xing	Pommel horse	—N/a	11.766	—N/a				11.766	8

Women
Team Final & Individual Qualification

Athlete	Event	Apparatus				Total	Rank
Athlete	Event	V	UB	BB	F	Total	Rank
Farah Abdul Hadi	Team	13.550	12.550	10.400	11.800	48.300	12 Q
Nur Azira Aziri	Team	11.450	10.450	9.850	11.150	42.900	23
Tan Ing Yueh	Team	12.850	11.650	10.850	11.300	46.650	14 Q
Geanie Ng Ee Ling	Team	DNS					
Total	Team	37.850	34.650	31.100	34.250	137.850	6

Individual Finals

Athlete	Event	Apparatus				Total	Rank
Athlete	Event	V	UB	BB	F	Total	Rank
Farah Abdul Hadi	All-around	13.300	11.050	11.550	10.975	46.875	12
Tan Ing Yueh	All-around	13.100	10.700	12.200	11.400	47.400	11

=== Rhythmic ===
Malaysia participated with 3 athletes (3 women).

Team & Individual Qualification

Athlete	Event	Apparatus				Total	Rank
Athlete	Event	Hoop	Ball	Clubs	Ribbon	Total	Rank
Izzah Amzan	Team	13.150 Q	13.650 Q	12.350	~~9.800~~	48.950	6
Koi Sie Yan	Team	12.900	12.650 Q	13.250 Q	~~11.150~~ Q	49.950	3 Q
Amy Kwan	Team	13.400 Q	11.550	12.400 Q	12.650 Q	50.000	2 Q
Total	Team	39.450	37.850	38.000	12.650	127.950	2nd place, silver medalist(s)

Individual Finals

Athlete	Event	Apparatus				Total	Rank
Athlete	Event	Hoop	Ball	Clubs	Ribbon	Total	Rank
Koi Sie Yan	Individual All-around	13.500	13.100	11.850	9.600	48.050	8
Amy Kwan	Individual All-around	12.100	12.250	14.200	12.950	51.500	3rd place, bronze medalist(s)
Amy Kwan	Individual hoop	13.550	—N/a				3rd place, bronze medalist(s)
Izzah Amzan	Individual hoop	11.900	—N/a				6
Koi Sie Yan	Individual ball	—N/a	13.400	—N/a			2nd place, silver medalist(s)
Izzah Amzan	Individual ball	—N/a	12.450	—N/a			6
Koi Sie Yan	Individual clubs	—N/a		13.850	—N/a		2nd place, silver medalist(s)
Amy Kwan	Individual clubs	—N/a		13.350	—N/a		4
Koi Sie Yan	Individual ribbon	—N/a			12.000	—N/a	3rd place, bronze medalist(s)
Amy Kwan	Individual ribbon	—N/a			13.200	—N/a	1st place, gold medalist(s)

== Lawn bowls ==
Malaysia will compete in Lawn bowls.

Men

Athlete	Event	Group Stage						Quarterfinal	Semifinal	Final / BM	
Athlete	Event	Opposition Score	Opposition Score	Opposition Score	Opposition Score	Opposition Score	Rank	Opposition Score	Opposition Score	Opposition Score	Rank
Muhammad Soufi Rusli	Singles	T Priaulx (GUE); W 21–11	A Rahman Omar (BRU); W 21–13	D Tagelagi (NIU); W 21–5	E Bell (SAM); W 21–12	D Burnette (SCO); L 19–21	2 Q	D Burnette (SCO); L 13–21	did not advance		
Fairul Izwan; Muhammad Hizlee Abdul Rais	Pairs	India; W 27–13	Norfolk Island; W 21–7	Samoa; W 30–6	Niue; W 16–12	Scotland; L 9–27	2 Q	Scotland; L 16–11	did not advance		7
Mohammad Syamil Ramli; Zulhilmie Redzuan; Muhammad Soufi Rusli	Triples	Northern Ireland; T 16–16	Cook Islands; L 10–16	Scotland; T 17–17	Norfolk Island; W 26–4	—N/a	4	did not advance			14
Fairul Izwan; Muhammad Hizlee Abdul Rais; Mohammad Syamil Ramli; Zulhilmie Redzuan	Fours	Niue; W 31–3	Fiji; W 18–9	Namibia; W 14-11	Northern Ireland; L 8-17	—N/a	2 Q	Scotland; L 12-13	did not advance		

Women

Athlete	Event	Group Stage						Quarterfinal	Semifinal	Final / BM	
Athlete	Event	Opposition Score	Opposition Score	Opposition Score	Opposition Score	Opposition Score	Rank	Opposition Score	Opposition Score	Opposition Score	Rank
Emma Firyana	Singles	K Rednall (ENG); W 21–11	l Tikoisuva (FIJ); W 20–19	P Blumsky (NIU); W 21–5	Pinki (IND); W 21–9	J Edwards (NZL); L 7–21	2 Q	J Edwards (NZL); L 9–21	did not advance		8
Siti Zalina; Emma Firyana	Pairs	Brunei; W 28–10	Cook Islands; W 33–6	Botswana; W 29-7	Scotland; W 18-11	—N/a	1 Q	India; W 17-11	Canada; W 15-8	Gold Medal Match; South Africa; W 15-14	1st place, gold medalist(s)
Azlina Arshad; Nur Fidrah Noh; Auni Fathiah	Triples	Cook Islands; W 20–14	Norfolk Island; W 24–13	Scotland; W 17–10	—N/a		1 Q	Scotland; L 15-17	did not advance		5
Siti Zalina; Azlina Arshad; Auni Fathiah; Nur Fidrah Noh	Fours	Cook Islands; W 22–8	Namibia; W 17–13	Papua New Guinea; W 17–6	Australia; L 13–14	—N/a	2 Q	Australia; L 12–14	did not advance		6

== Rugby sevens ==
=== Men's tournament ===
Malaysia qualified a men's rugby sevens team of 12 athletes, by being the second highest ranked Commonwealth nation at the 2017 Asia Rugby Sevens Series.

Roster

- Wan Ismail
- Mohammad Safwan Abdullah
- Muhammad Zulhisham Rasli
- Muhammad Siddiq Jalil
- Nik Mohd Zain
- Mohamad Khairul Ramli
- Zulkiflee Azmi
- Muhammad Zharif Affandi
- Muhammad Ameer Zulkeffli
- Muhammad Azwan Mat Zizi
- Muhammad Nasharuddin Ismail
- Muhamad Firdaus Tarmizi

Pool A

Pos	Team	Pld	W	D	L	PF	PA	PD	Pts	Qualification
1	South Africa	3	3	0	0	121	5	+116	9	Semi-finals
2	Scotland	3	2	0	1	73	26	+47	7	Classification semi-finals
3	Papua New Guinea	3	1	0	2	31	84	−53	5	
4	Malaysia	3	0	0	3	5	115	−110	3	

Source: GC2018
Rules for classification: 1) Points; 2) Head-to-head result; 3) Point difference; 4) Points scored.

14 April 2018
12:05

South Africa	43–0	Malaysia
Try: Sage 2' m Geduld (2) 3' m, 9' c Du Preez 4' c Snyman 7' m Specman 8' c Agaba 10' c Con: Du Preez (2/5) 5', 8'; Geduld (2/2) 9', 10'	(Gold Coast 2018)

Robina Stadium, Gold Coast
Referee: Craig Evans (Wales)

14 April 2018
18:15

Scotland	41–0	Malaysia
Try: Graham 1' m Farndale (2) 3' c, 4' m Horne (2) 6' m, 10' c McFarland 7' c Fergusson 13' m Con: Jackson (1/4) 3'; Horne (2/2) 7', 10'; Fergusson (0/1)	(Gold Coast 2018)

Robina Stadium, Gold Coast
Referee: Richard Haughton (England)

14 April 2018
21:55

Papua New Guinea	31–5	Malaysia
Try: Kapana (2) 4' m, 6' c Guise 7' c Vali 8' c Tirang 12' m Con: Guise (1/3) 6'; Tokavai (2/2) 7', 8'	(Gold Coast 2018)	Try: Tarmizi 10' m Con: Affandi (0/1)

Robina Stadium, Gold Coast
Referee: Rasta Rasivhenge (South Africa)

== Shooting ==
Malaysia participated with 9 athletes (6 men and 3 women).

Men

Athlete	Event	Qualification		Final	
Athlete	Event	Points	Rank	Points	Rank
Muhammad Ezuan Nasir Khan	50 metre rifle prone	609.6	11	did not advance	
Muhammad Ezuan Nasir Khan	10 metre air rifle	614.6	9	did not advance	
Hasli Amir Hasan	25 metre rapid fire pistol	564-13x	7	did not advance	
Johnathan Wong	50 metre pistol	545 -6x	5 Q	126.0	7
Johnathan Wong	10 metre air pistol	570 -18x	3 Q	112.0	8
Charles Chen Seong Fook	Trap	107	22	did not advance	
Abraham Eng Wei Jin	Double trap	117	16	did not advance	
Benjamin Khor Cheng Jie	Double trap	119	15	did not advance	

Women

Athlete	Event	Qualification		Final	
Athlete	Event	Points	Rank	Points	Rank
Nur Suryani Mohamed Taibi	50 metre rifle 3 positions	571-13x	10	did not advance	
Nur Suryani Mohamed Taibi	50 metre rifle prone	—N/a		613.9	7
Nur Suryani Mohamed Taibi	10 metre air rifle	406.6	11	did not advance	
Alia Sazana Azahari	25 metre pistol	571-18x	6 Q	26	3rd place, bronze medalist(s)
Bibiana Ng Pei Chin	25 metre pistol	569-16x	8 Q	12	7
Bibiana Ng Pei Chin	10 metre air pistol	370 -4x	11	did not advance	

== Squash ==
Malaysia participated with 9 athletes (5 men and 4 women).

Individual

Athlete	Event	Round of 64	Round of 32	Round of 16	Quarterfinals	Semifinals	Final/Bronze Medal Match	
Athlete	Event	Opposition Score	Opposition Score	Opposition Score	Opposition Score	Opposition Score	Opposition Score	Rank
Nafiizwan Adnan	Men's singles	Bye	E Williams (NZL); W 3–1	R Cuskelly (AUS); W W/O	N Matthew (ENG); W 3-2	J Willstrop (ENG); L 0-3	Bronze medal match J Makin (WAL); W 3-2	3rd place, bronze medalist(s)
Eain Yow Ng	Men's singles	R Hedrick (AUS); L 2–3	did not advance					
Ivan Yuen	Men's singles	M Patrick (TTO); W 3–0	HP Sandhu (IND); W 3–0	P Coll (NZL); L 0–3	did not advance			
Aifa Azman	Women's singles	Bye	L Aitken (SCO); W W/O	T Evans (WAL); L 1–3	did not advance			
Nicol David	Women's singles	Bye	C Sultana (MLT); W 3–0	S Cornett (CAN); W 3–1	A Waters (ENG); W 3–2	J King (NZL); L 1–3	Bronze medal match T Evans (WAL); L 1–3	4
Sivasangari Subramaniam	Women's singles	Bye	A Thomson (SCO); W 3–1	J King (NZL); L 1–3	did not advance			

Doubles

Athlete	Event	Group stage				Round of 16	Quarterfinals	Semifinals	Final	
Athlete	Event	Opposition Score	Opposition Score	Opposition Score	Rank	Opposition Score	Opposition Score	Opposition Score	Opposition Score	Rank
Mohd Syafiq Kamal; Eain Yow Ng	Men's doubles	Selby (ENG); Waller (ENG); L 0-2	Kawooya (UGA); Rukunya (UGA); W 2-0	—N/a	2 Q	Adnan (MAS); Yuen (MAS); W 2-1	Clyne (SCO); Lobban (SCO); L 1-2	did not advance		
Nafiizwan Adnan; Ivan Yuen	Men's doubles	Bailey (SVG); Wilson (SVG); W 2–0	Bddoes (NZL); Williams (NZL); W 2-0	—N/a	1 Q	Kamal (MAS); Ng (MAS); L 1-2	did not advance			
Rachel Arnold; Sivasangari Subramaniam	Women's doubles	King (NZL); L-Murphy (NZL); W 2–0	Cardwell (AUS); Nunn (AUS); W 2–1	—N/a	1 Q	—N/a	Massaro (ENG); Perry (ENG); L 0-2	did not advance		
Aifa Azman; Sanjay Singh	Mixed doubles	Knaggs (TTO); Wilson (TTO); W 2–0	Grinham (AUS); Cuskelly (AUS); L 0–2	—N/a	2 Q	Dipika (IND); Ghosal (IND); L 1-2	did not advance			

- W/O :Walkover

== Swimming ==
Malaysia participated with 7 athletes (5 men and 2 women).

Men

Athlete	Event	Heat		Semifinal		Final	
Athlete	Event	Time	Rank	Time	Rank	Time	Rank
Jie Chan	50 m butterfly	25.20	23	did not advance			
Jie Chan	100 m butterfly	54.33	11 Q	54.56	13	did not advance	
Keith Lim Kit Sern	50 m freestyle	23.33	22	did not advance			
Keith Lim Kit Sern	100 m freestyle	51.04	28	did not advance			
Keith Lim Kit Sern	50 m butterfly	25.25	25	did not advance			
Welson Sim	100 m freestyle	50.91	27	did not advance			
Welson Sim	200 m freestyle	1:49.58	16	—N/a		did not advance	
Welson Sim	400 m freestyle	3:51.78	8 Q	—N/a		3:53.36	7
Welson Sim	1500 m freestyle	—N/a				15:31.14	5
Tern Jian Han	50 m backstroke	25.83	5 Q	25.60	5 Q	25.96	8
Tern Jian Han	100 m backstroke	58.10	17	did not advance			
Ting Jin Ping	200 m freestyle S14	2:22.52	7 Q	—N/a		2:20.93	7

Women

Athlete	Event	Heat		Semifinal		Final	
Athlete	Event	Time	Rank	Time	Rank	Time	Rank
Caroline Chan Zi Xin	50 m backstroke	30.10	18	did not advance			
Caroline Chan Zi Xin	100 m backstroke	1:05.94	20	did not advance			
Carmen Lim	50 m freestyle S8	35.95	5 Q	—N/a		36.85	5

== Table tennis ==
Malaysia participated with 8 athletes (4 men and 4 women).

Singles

Athletes	Event	Group Stage			Round of 64	Round of 32	Round of 16	Quarterfinal	Semifinal	Final	Rank
Athletes	Event	Opposition Score	Opposition Score	Rank	Opposition Score	Opposition Score	Opposition Score	Opposition Score	Opposition Score	Opposition Score	Rank
Javen Choong	Men's singles	Hukmani (BIZ); W 4–0	Dalgleish (SCO); W 4–1	1 Q	Kamal (IND); L 3-4	did not advance					
Leong Chee Feng	Men's singles	Dookram (TTO); W 4–1	Lartey (GHA); W 4–0	1 Q	Medjugorac (CAN); W 4–1	Yan (AUS); W 4–1	Desai (IND); L 1-4	did not advance			
Ashraf Muhamad Rizal	Men's singles	Daniel (SVG); W 4–0	Watson (JAM); W 4-2	1 Q	—N/a	Powell (AUS); W 4–1	Gao (SGP); L 0-4	did not advance			
Alice Chang Li Sian	Women's singles	Nambozo (UGA); W 4–0	Hursey (WAL); W 4–0	1 Q	—N/a	Yee (FIJ); W 4–0	Zhou (SGP); L 3-4	did not advance			
Ho Ying	Women's singles	Mwaisyula (TAN); W 4–0	Cummings (GUY); W 4–1	1 Q	—N/a	Carey (WAL); W 4–2	Lay (AUS); L 1-4	did not advance			
Karen Lyne	Women's singles	Lowe (GUY); W 4–1	Li (FIJ); W 4–0	1 Q	—N/a	Tapper (AUS); L 1-4	did not advance				

Doubles

Athletes	Event	Round of 64	Round of 32	Round of 16	Quarterfinal	Semifinal	Final	Rank
Athletes	Event	Opposition Score	Opposition Score	Opposition Score	Opposition Score	Opposition Score	Opposition Score	Rank
Javen Choong; Leong Chee Feng	Men's doubles	—N/a	Doughty (BAR); Smith (BAR); W 3-0	Aruna (NGR); Toriola (NGR); L 1-3	did not advance			
Alice Chang Li Sian; Tee Ai Xin	Women's doubles	—N/a	B-Danso (GHA); Kwabi (GHA); W 3-1	Tapper (AUS); Bromley (AUS); L 1-3	did not advance			
Ho Ying; Karen Lyne	Women's doubles	—N/a	Ali (PAK); Khan (PAK); W 3-0	S Yee (FIJ); G Yee (FIJ); W 3-0	Lay (AUS); Miao (AUS); W 3-1	Batra (IND); Das (IND); L 0-3	Bronze Medal Match; Mukherjee (IND); Sahasrabudhe (IND); W 3-1	3rd place, bronze medalist(s)
Ho Ying; Leong Chee Feng	Mixed doubles	Freeman (SKN); Hodge (SKN); W/O; W 3–0	Gnanasekaran (IND); Batra (IND); L 0-3	did not advance				
Tee Ai Xin; Ashraf Muhamad Rizal	Mixed doubles	Ramasawmy (MRI); Yogarajah (MRI); W 3–0	McBeath (ENG); Siblet (ENG); L 0–3	did not advance				
Karen Lyne; Javen Choong	Mixed doubles	Kapugeekiyana (SRI); Ranasinga (SRI); W 3–0	Desai (IND); Sahasrabudhe (IND); W 3–1	Walker (ENG); Payet (ENG); L 1-3	did not advance			

Team

Athletes	Event	Group Stage			Round of 16	Quarterfinal	Semifinal	Final	Rank
Athletes	Event	Opposition Score	Opposition Score	Rank	Opposition Score	Opposition Score	Opposition Score	Opposition Score	Rank
Javen Choong; Leong Chee Feng; Ashraf Muhamad Rizal	Men's team	Nigeria; L 1–3	Belize; W 3–0	2	Scotland; W 3–1	India; L 0–3	did not advance		
Alice Chang Li Sian; Ho Ying; Karen Lyne; Tee Ai Xin	Women's team	Singapore; L 0–3	Fiji; W 3–0	2	—N/a	India; L 0–3	did not advance		

Para-sport

Athletes	Event	Group Stage				Semifinal	Final	Rank
Athletes	Event	Opposition Score	Opposition Score	Opposition Score	Rank	Opposition Score	Opposition Score	Rank
Mohamad Azwar Bakar	Men's TT6–10	Kent (CAN); W 3–1	Daybell (ENG); L 1–3	Stacey (WAL); L 0-3	3	did not advance		

== Triathlon ==
Malaysia participated with 2 athletes (1 man and 1 woman).

Individual

Athlete	Event	Swim (750 m)	Trans 1	Bike (20 km)	Trans 2	Run (5 km)	Total	Rank
Xian Hao Chong	Men's	10:42	0:41	33:21	0:32	19:29	1:04:45	30
Chen Yin Yang	Women's	11:08	0:46	38:41	0:41	24:57	1:16:13	24

== Weightlifting ==
Malaysia participated with 10 athletes (6 men and 4 women).

Men

Athlete	Event	Snatch	Clean & Jerk	Total	Rank
Azroy Hazalwafie	−56 kg	117 GR	144	261 GR	1st place, gold medalist(s)
Muhammad Aznil Bidin	−62 kg	126	162	288	1st place, gold medalist(s)
Muhammad Erry Hidayat	−69 kg	131	160	291	5
Abdul Rahim Mubin	−77 kg	130	160	290	6
Mohamad Fazrul Azrie	−85 kg	145	183	328	3rd place, bronze medalist(s)
Mohamad Norfarhan Ideris	+105 kg	141	185	326	9

Women

Athlete	Event	Snatch	Clean & Jerk	Total	Rank
Sharifah Sydanuar	−53 kg	75	95	170	7
Marlyne Marceeta	−58 kg	65	90	155	11
Jabriella Teo Samuel	−75 kg	81	103	184	8
Siti Aisyah Rosli	−90 kg	91	123	214	4

=== Powerlifting ===
Malaysia participated with 2 athletes (2 men).

Athlete	Event	Result	Rank
Bonnie Bunyau Gustin	Men's lightweight	169.8	4
Jong Yee Khie	Men's heavyweight	188.7	2nd place, silver medalist(s)

== See also ==
- Malaysia at the 2018 Summer Youth Olympics
