= Table tennis at the 2018 Commonwealth Games – Women's doubles =

Table tennis – Women's doubles at the 2018 Commonwealth Games
- Venue: Oxenford Studios
- Dates: 11 – 13 April 2018
- Competitors: 40 from 15 nations

Medalists
gold medal	Feng Tianwei; Yu Mengyu	Singapore
silver medal	Manika Batra; Mouma Das	India
bronze medal	Ho Ying; Karen Lyne	Malaysia

Table tennis women's doubles at the 2018 Commonwealth Games was held at the Oxenford Studios on the Gold Coast, Australia from 11 to 13 April.

== Finals ==
Semifinals
Feng Tianwei (SGP); Yu Mengyu (SGP)	11	11	11
Sutirtha Mukherjee (IND); Pooja Sahasrabudhe (IND)	5	7	5
Ho Ying (MAS); Karen Lyne (MAS)	4	6	5
Manika Batra (IND); Mouma Das (IND)	11	11	11

Gold medal match
Feng Tianwei (SGP); Yu Mengyu (SGP)	11	11	11
Manika Batra (IND); Mouma Das (IND)	5	4	5
Bronze medal match
Sutirtha Mukherjee (IND); Pooja Sahasrabudhe (IND)	13	7	11	7
Ho Ying (MAS); Karen Lyne (MAS)	15	11	8	11

== Top half ==
=== Section 1 ===
Round of 32					Round of 16					Quarterfinals
					Feng TW (SGP); Yu MY (SGP)	11	11	11
					N Cummings (GUY); T Lowe (GUY)	3	2	4
										Feng TW (SGP); Yu MY (SGP)	11	11	11
A Chang LS (MAS); Tee AX (MAS)	11	11	11	11						M Bromley (AUS); M Tapper (AUS)	3	5	1
C Baah-Danso (GHA); C Kwabi (GHA)	4	13	4	3	A Chang LS (MAS); Tee AX (MAS)	2	10	11	7
					M Bromley (AUS); M Tapper (AUS)	11	12	9	11

=== Section 2 ===
Round of 32				Round of 16					Quarterfinals
				C Carey (WAL); C Thomas (WAL)	7	5	11	6
R Kinoo (MRI); SA Ramasawmy (MRI)	3	4	4	S Mukherjee (IND); P Sahasrabudhe (IND)	11	11	8	11
S Mukherjee (IND); P Sahasrabudhe (IND)	11	11	11						S Mukherjee (IND); P Sahasrabudhe (IND)	11	11	14
									A Cote (CAN); Zhang M (CAN)	6	7	12
				D Payet (ENG); K Sibley (ENG)	11	7	4	5
				A Cote (CAN); Zhang M (CAN)	8	11	11	11

== Bottom half ==
=== Section 3 ===
Round of 32				Round of 16						Quarterfinals
				Lin Y (SGP); Zhou YH (SGP)	10	11	11	6	8
				Lay JF (AUS); M Miao (AUS)	12	4	2	11	11
										Lay JF (AUS); M Miao (AUS)	11	11	9	9
Ho Y (MAS); K Lyne (MAS)	11	11	11							Ho Y (MAS); K Lyne (MAS)	9	13	11	11
HA Ali (PAK); F Khan (PAK)	7	4	4	Ho Y (MAS); K Lyne (MAS)	11	11	11
				G Yee (FIJ); S Yee (FIJ)	3	7	6

=== Section 4 ===
Round of 32				Round of 16				Quarterfinals
				T-T Ho (ENG); M Tsaptsinos (ENG)	11	11	11
N Mwaisyula (TAN); F Pazi (TAN)	3	7	4	A Lulu (VAN); P Tommy (VAN)	8	6	5
A Lulu (VAN); P Tommy (VAN)	11	11	11					T-T Ho (ENG); M Tsaptsinos (ENG)	14	3	7	6
								M Batra (IND); M Das (IND)	12	11	11	11
				H Kapugeekinaya (SRI); I Madurangi (SRI)	4	4	1
				M Batra (IND); M Das (IND)	11	11	11
