= Table tennis at the 2018 Commonwealth Games =

- Venue: Oxenford Studios
- Location: Gold Coast, Australia
- Dates: 5 to 15 April 2018

Table tennis at the 2018 Commonwealth Games was the fifth appearance of Table tennis at the Commonwealth Games. The table tennis competition at the 2018 Commonwealth Games was held at the Oxenford Studios on the Gold Coast, Australia, from April 5 to 15. A total of nine events are scheduled to be held, three each for men and women and a mixed doubles event. A further two para sport events are also scheduled to be held.

== Medal table ==
* Host nation (Australia)

Rank	Nation	Gold	Silver	Bronze	Total
1	India	3	2	3	8
2	Singapore	3	2	1	6
3	England	2	2	2	6
4	Australia*	1	0	1	2
5	Nigeria	0	3	0	3
6	Malaysia	0	0	1	1
6	Wales	0	0	1	1
Totals (7 entries)		9	9	9	27

== Medallists ==
Event	Gold	Silver	Bronze
Men's singles	Gao Ning; Singapore	Quadri Aruna; Nigeria	Sharath Kamal; India
Women's singles	Manika Batra; India	Yu Mengyu; Singapore	Feng Tianwei; Singapore
Men's doubles	England; Paul Drinkhall; Liam Pitchford	India; Sharath Kamal; Sathiyan Gnanasekaran	India; Harmeet Desai; Sanil Shetty
Women's doubles	Singapore; Feng Tianwei; Yu Mengyu	India; Manika Batra; Mouma Das	Malaysia; Ho Ying; Karen Lyne
Mixed doubles	Singapore; Gao Ning; Yu Mengyu	England; Liam Pitchford; Tin-Tin Ho	India; Sathiyan Gnanasekaran; Manika Batra
Men's team	India; Sharath Kamal; Anthony Amalraj; Harmeet Desai; Sanil Shetty; Sathiyan Gnanasekaran	Nigeria; Bode Abiodun; Quadri Aruna; Azeez Jamiu; Olajide Omotayo; Segun Toriola	England; Paul Drinkhall; David McBeath; Liam Pitchford; Sam Walker
Women's team	India; Manika Batra; Mouma Das; Sutirtha Mukherjee; Madhurika Patkar; Pooja Sahasrabudhe	Singapore; Feng Tianwei; Lin Ye; Yu Mengyu; Zhang Wanling; Zhou Yihan	England; Tin-Tin Ho; Denise Payet; Kelly Sibley; Maria Tsaptsinos

=== Para ===
Event	Gold	Silver	Bronze
Men's TT6-10	Ross Wilson; England	Kim Daybell; England	Joshua Stacey; Wales
Women's TT6-10	Melissa Tapper; Australia	Faith Obazuaye; Nigeria	Andrea McDonnell; Australia

== Participating nations ==
There are 35 participating nations in Table tennis with a total of 160 athletes.

- Australia (12 athletes)
- Bahamas (1)
- Barbados (4)
- Belize (3)
- Canada (8)
- England (11)
- Fiji (5)
- Ghana (6)
- Guyana (6)
- India (12)
- Jamaica (2)
- Kenya (2)
- Kiribati (3)
- Malaysia (8)
- Mauritius (6)
- Nigeria (7)
- Northern Ireland (4)
- Pakistan (4)
- Papua New Guinea (2)
- Saint Vincent and the Grenadines (3)
- Saint Kitts and Nevis (2)
- Scotland (3)
- Seychelles (2)
- Sierra Leone (2)
- Singapore (10)
- Solomon Islands (2)
- South Africa (1)
- Sri Lanka (6)
- Tanzania (4)
- Trinidad and Tobago (4)
- Tuvalu (3)
- Uganda (2)
- Vanuatu (5)
- Wales (4)
- Zambia (1)
