= Table tennis at the 2018 Commonwealth Games – Women's singles =

Table tennis – Women's singles at the 2018 Commonwealth Games
- Venue: Oxenford Studios
- Dates: 10 – 14 April 2018
- Competitors: 49 from 22 nations

Medalists
gold medal	Manika Batra	India
silver medal	Yu Mengyu	Singapore
bronze medal	Feng Tianwei	Singapore

Table tennis women's singles at the 2018 Commonwealth Games was held at the Oxenford Studios on the Gold Coast, Australia from 10 to 14 April.

== Main draw ==
=== Finals ===
Semifinals
1	Feng Tianwei (SGP)	10	11	8	11	11	9	11
4	Manika Batra (IND)	12	5	11	5	5	11	13
3	Yu Mengyu (SGP)	11	11	9	11	11
2	Zhang Mo (CAN)	7	8	11	8	5

Gold medal match
4	Manika Batra (IND) (gold)	11	11	11	11
3	Yu Mengyu (SGP) (silver)	7	6	2	7
Bronze medal match
1	Feng Tianwei (SGP) (bronze)	11	11	5	8	11	11
2	Zhang Mo (CAN)	2	7	11	11	7	3

=== Top half ===
==== Section 1 ====
Round of 32
K Lyne (MAS)	11	8	11	7	8
12	M Tapper (AUS)	13	11	7	11	11
11	K Sibley (ENG)	11	11	11	11
A Cote (CAN)	3	5	4	1
R Chung (TTO)	7	14	9	2	9
8	M Patkar (IND)	11	12	11	11	11

Round of 16
1	Feng TW (SGP)	11	11	11	11
12	M Tapper (AUS)	5	2	9	7
11	K Sibley (ENG)	11	11	2	11	8	11
8	M Patkar (IND)	9	8	11	3	11	6

Quarterfinals
1	Feng TW (SGP)	11	11	11	14
11	K Sibley (ENG)	5	9	3	12

==== Section 2 ====
Round of 32						Round of 16									Quarterfinals
						7	Zhou YH (SGP)	7	7	7	11	11	11	11
	A Chang LS (MAS)	11	11	11	11		A Chang LS (MAS)	11	11	11	8	5	4	9
16	S Yee (FIJ)	4	4	8	5										7	Zhou YH (SGP)	5	6	2	11	9
13	T Feng (AUS)	11	11	11	11										4	M Batra (IND)	11	11	11	6	11
	C Thomas (WAL)	6	6	9	5	13	T Feng (AUS)	6	6	11	9	7
						4	M Batra (IND)	11	11	9	11	11

=== Bottom half ===
==== Section 3 ====
Round of 32
C Baah-Danso (GHA)	11	11	11	11	11
15	C Bristol (SEY)	13	9	5	7	4
9	T-T Ho (ENG)	11	12	11	11
H Kapugeekinaya (SRI)	8	10	2	5
E Ho WK (MRI)	6	1	8	7
6	M Das (IND)	11	11	11	11

Round of 16
3	Yu MY (SGP)	11	11	11	11
C Baah-Danso (GHA)	3	4	5	4
9	T-T Ho (ENG)	7	11	11	8	13	7	8
6	M Das (IND)	11	7	9	11	11	11	11

Quarterfinals
3	Yu MY (SGP)	15	11	11	7	11
6	M Das (IND)	13	7	5	11	5

==== Section 4 ====
Round of 32
5	Lay JF (AUS)	11	12	11	12
P Tommy (VAN)	4	10	3	10
Ho Y (MAS)	11	5	11	11	8	11
10	C Carey (WAL)	7	11	5	6	11	8
14	G Yee (FIJ)	4	3	2	7
D Payet (ENG)	11	11	11	11

Round of 16
5	Lay JF (AUS)	8	11	11	11	11
Ho Y (MAS)	11	5	7	2	5
D Payet (ENG)	3	4	7	6
2	Zhang M (CAN)	11	11	11	11

Quarterfinals
5	Lay JF (AUS)	2	2	5	6
2	Zhang M (CAN)	11	11	11	11

== Preliminary stage ==
=== Group 1 ===
Name	MP	MW	ML	GW	GL
Priscilla Tommy (VAN)	2	2	0	8	0
Fathiya Pazi (TAN)	2	1	1	4	4
Brenda Katepu (TUV)	2	0	2	0	8

Date		Score		Set 1	Set 2	Set 3	Set 4	Set 5	Set 6	Set 7
10 Apr	Priscilla Tommy (VAN)	4–0	Brenda Katepu (TUV)	11–0	11–6	11–3	11–3			
10 Apr	Fathiya Pazi (TAN)	4–0	Brenda Katepu (TUV)	11–8	11–6	17–15	14–12			
10 Apr	Priscilla Tommy (VAN)	4–0	Fathiya Pazi (TAN)	12–10	12–10	11–6	11–2			

=== Group 2 ===
Name	MP	MW	ML	GW	GL
Elodie Ho Wan Kau (MRI)	2	2	0	8	1
Sejal Thakkar (KEN)	2	1	1	4	5
Stephanie Qwea (VAN)	1	0	2	2	8

Date		Score		Set 1	Set 2	Set 3	Set 4	Set 5	Set 6	Set 7
10 Apr	Stephanie Qwea (VAN)	1–4	Elodie Ho Wan Kau (MRI)	11–8	6–11	8–11	8–11	9–11		
10 Apr	Sejal Thakkar (KEN)	0–4	Elodie Ho Wan Kau (MRI)	5–11	6–11	9–11	4–11			
10 Apr	Stephanie Qwea (VAN)	1–4	Sejal Thakkar (KEN)	6–11	11–9	7–11	6–11	9–11		

=== Group 3 ===
Name	MP	MW	ML	GW	GL
Rheann Chung (TTO)	2	2	0	8	0
Erandi Wasusawithana (SRI)	2	1	1	4	4
Cynthia Kwabi (GHA)	2	0	2	0	8

Date		Score		Set 1	Set 2	Set 3	Set 4	Set 5	Set 6	Set 7
10 Apr	Erandi Wasusawithana (SRI)	4–0	Cynthia Kwabi (GHA)	11–8	11–8	11–4	11–5			
10 Apr	Rheann Chung (TTO)	4–0	Cynthia Kwabi (GHA)	11–4	11–2	13–11	11–3			
10 Apr	Erandi Wasusawithana (SRI)	0–4	Rheann Chung (TTO)	8–11	3–11	4–11	7–11			

=== Group 4 ===
Name	MP	MW	ML	GW	GL
Alicia Cote (CAN)	2	2	0	8	0
Sanjana Alix (MRI)	2	1	1	4	5
Priscilla Greaves (GUY)	2	0	2	1	8

Date		Score		Set 1	Set 2	Set 3	Set 4	Set 5	Set 6	Set 7
10 Apr	Alicia Cote (CAN)	4–0	Sanjana Alix (MRI)	11–7	11–5	11–3	11–4			
10 Apr	Priscilla Greaves (GUY)	1–4	Sanjana Alix (MRI)	1–11	6–11	11–7	7–11	11–13		
10 Apr	Alicia Cote (CAN)	4–0	Priscilla Greaves (GUY)	11–5	11–5	11–4	11–3			

=== Group 5 ===
Name	MP	MW	ML	GW	GL
Chloe Thomas (WAL)	2	2	0	8	0
Fatima Khan (PAK)	2	1	1	4	5
Angelisa Freeman (SKN)	2	0	2	1	8

Date		Score		Set 1	Set 2	Set 3	Set 4	Set 5	Set 6	Set 7
10 Apr	Chloe Thomas (WAL)	4–0	Fatima Khan (PAK)	11–7	11–3	11–5	11–4			
10 Apr	Angelisa Freeman (SKN)	1–4	Fatima Khan (PAK)	7–11	8–11	6–11	11–3	5–11		
10 Apr	Chloe Thomas (WAL)	4–0	Angelisa Freeman (SKN)	11–1	11–3	11–4	11–7			

=== Group 6 ===
Name	MP	MW	ML	GW	GL
Ho Ying (MAS)	2	2	0	8	1
Natalie Cummings (GUY)	2	1	1	5	6
Neema Mwaisyula (TAN)	2	0	2	2	8

Date		Score		Set 1	Set 2	Set 3	Set 4	Set 5	Set 6	Set 7
10 Apr	Ho Ying (MAS)	4–0	Neema Mwaisyula (TAN)	11–1	11–3	11–7	11–1			
10 Apr	Natalie Cummings (GUY)	4–2	Neema Mwaisyula (TAN)	8–11	11–5	11–5	7–11	11–2	11–2	
10 Apr	Ho Ying (MAS)	4–1	Natalie Cummings (GUY)	11–7	9–11	11–5	11–6	11–7		

=== Group 7 ===
Name	MP	MW	ML	GW	GL
Denise Payet (ENG)	2	2	0	8	1
Ishara Madurangi (SRI)	2	1	1	5	5
Ruqaiyah Kinoo (MRI)	2	0	2	1	8

Date		Score		Set 1	Set 2	Set 3	Set 4	Set 5	Set 6	Set 7
10 Apr	Ishara Madurangi (SRI)	4–1	Ruqaiyah Kinoo (MRI)	11–3	9–11	12–10	11–7	11–8		
10 Apr	Denise Payet (ENG)	4–0	Ruqaiyah Kinoo (MRI)	11–2	11–4	11–7	11–2			
10 Apr	Ishara Madurangi (SRI)	1–4	Denise Payet (ENG)	6–11	12–14	11–9	8–11	6–11		

=== Group 8 ===
Name	MP	MW	ML	GW	GL
Karen Lyne (MAS)	2	2	0	8	1
Trenace Lowe (GUY)	2	1	1	5	5
Xuan Li (FIJ)	2	0	2	1	8

Date		Score		Set 1	Set 2	Set 3	Set 4	Set 5	Set 6	Set 7
10 Apr	Trenace Lowe (GUY)	1–4	Karen Lyne (MAS)	12–10	5–11	5–11	11–13	9–11		
10 Apr	Xuan Li (FIJ)	0–4	Karen Lyne (MAS)	7–11	5–11	3–11	2–11			
10 Apr	Trenace Lowe (GUY)	4–1	Xuan Li (FIJ)	11–9	10–12	11–7	11–4	11–6		

=== Group 9 ===
Name	MP	MW	ML	GW	GL
Alice Chang (MAS)	2	2	0	8	0
Anna Hursey (WAL)	2	1	1	4	4
Halima Nambozo (UGA)	2	0	2	0	8

Date		Score		Set 1	Set 2	Set 3	Set 4	Set 5	Set 6	Set 7
10 Apr	Alice Chang (MAS)	4–0	Halima Nambozo (UGA)	11–5	11–5	11–5	11–6			
10 Apr	Anna Hursey (WAL)	4–0	Halima Nambozo (UGA)	11–5	11–4	11–5	11–4			
10 Apr	Alice Chang (MAS)	4–0	Anna Hursey (WAL)	11–8	11–8	11–3	11–4			

=== Group 10 ===
Name	MP	MW	ML	GW	GL
Hansani Kapugeekinaya (SRI)	2	2	0	8	1
Justina Yeung (CAN)	2	1	1	5	4
Hareem Anwar Ali (PAK)	2	0	2	0	8

Date		Score		Set 1	Set 2	Set 3	Set 4	Set 5	Set 6	Set 7
10 Apr	Hansani Kapugeekinaya (SRI)	4–0	Hareem Anwar Ali (PAK)	11–3	11–3	11–6	11–8			
10 Apr	Justina Yeung (CAN)	4–0	Hareem Anwar Ali (PAK)	11–4	11–7	11–2	11–2			
10 Apr	Hansani Kapugeekinaya (SRI)	4–1	Justina Yeung (CAN)	11–7	11–5	7–11	11–9	11–8		

=== Group 11 ===
Name	MP	MW	ML	GW	GL
Celia Baah-Danso (GHA)	2	2	0	8	1
Anolyn Lulu (VAN)	2	1	1	5	4
Lalmah Sifi (SOL)	2	0	2	0	8

Date		Score		Set 1	Set 2	Set 3	Set 4	Set 5	Set 6	Set 7
10 Apr	Celia Baah-Danso (GHA)	4–0	Lalmah Sifi (SOL)	11–6	11–2	11–5	12–10			
10 Apr	Anolyn Lulu (VAN)	4–0	Lalmah Sifi (SOL)	11–4	11–5	11–2	11–6			
10 Apr	Celia Baah-Danso (GHA)	4–1	Anolyn Lulu (VAN)	11–8	11–9	11–7	9–11	11–4		
