= Table tennis at the 2018 Commonwealth Games – Men's TT6–10 singles =

Table tennis – Men's TT6–10 singles at the 2018 Commonwealth Games
- Venue: Oxenford Studios
- Dates: 10 – 14 April 2018
- Competitors: 8 from 7 nations

Medalists
| gold medal | Ross Wilson | England |
| silver medal | Kim Daybell | England |
| bronze medal | Joshua Stacey | Wales |

Table tennis TT6–10 men's singles at the 2018 Commonwealth Games was held at the Oxenford Studios on the Gold Coast, Australia from 10 to 14 April.

== Group stage ==
=== Group 1 ===
| Name | MP | MW | ML | GW | GL |
|---|---|---|---|---|---|
| Kim Daybell (ENG) | 3 | 3 | 0 | 9 | 3 |
| Joshua Stacey (WAL) | 3 | 2 | 1 | 8 | 3 |
| Mohd Azwar Bakar (MAS) | 3 | 1 | 2 | 4 | 7 |
| Ian Kent (CAN) | 3 | 0 | 3 | 1 | 9 |

| Date | | Score | | Set 1 | Set 2 | Set 3 | Set 4 | Set 5 |
|---|---|---|---|---|---|---|---|---|
| 10 Apr | Kim Daybell (ENG) | 3–2 | Joshua Stacey (WAL) | 7–11 | 11–9 | 12–10 | 6–11 | 11–6 |
| 10 Apr | Mohd Azwar Bakar (MAS) | 3–1 | Ian Kent (CAN) | 8–11 | 11–3 | 12–10 | 11–7 | |
| 11 Apr | Kim Daybell (ENG) | 3–1 | Mohd Azwar Bakar (MAS) | 6–11 | 11–9 | 14–12 | 13–11 | |
| 11 Apr | Joshua Stacey (WAL) | 3–0 | Ian Kent (CAN) | 11–8 | 11–6 | 11–7 | | |
| 12 Apr | Mohd Azwar Bakar (MAS) | 0–3 | Joshua Stacey (WAL) | 10–12 | 7–11 | 6–11 | | |
| 12 Apr | Kim Daybell (ENG) | 3–0 | Ian Kent (CAN) | 11–7 | 11–1 | 11–7 | | |

=== Group 2 ===
| Name | MP | MW | ML | GW | GL |
|---|---|---|---|---|---|
| Ross Wilson (ENG) | 3 | 3 | 0 | 9 | 2 |
| Theo Cogill (RSA) | 3 | 2 | 1 | 8 | 3 |
| Barak Mizrachi (AUS) | 3 | 1 | 2 | 3 | 6 |
| Temitope Ogunsanya (NGR) | 3 | 0 | 3 | 0 | 9 |

| Date | | Score | | Set 1 | Set 2 | Set 3 | Set 4 | Set 5 |
|---|---|---|---|---|---|---|---|---|
| 10 Apr | Ross Wilson (ENG) | 3–0 | Barak Mizrachi (AUS) | 11–4 | 11–8 | 11–5 | | |
| 10 Apr | Theo Cogill (RSA) | 3–0 | Temitope Ogunsanya (NGR) | 11–4 | 11–4 | 11–2 | | |
| 11 Apr | Ross Wilson (ENG) | 3–2 | Theo Cogill (RSA) | 11–7 | 10–12 | 9–11 | 11–9 | 11–7 |
| 11 Apr | Barak Mizrachi (AUS) | 3–0 | Temitope Ogunsanya (NGR) | 11–9 | 11–4 | 11–4 | | |
| 12 Apr | Theo Cogill (RSA) | 3–0 | Barak Mizrachi (AUS) | 11–4 | 11–3 | 11–6 | | |
| 12 Apr | Ross Wilson (ENG) | 3–0 | Temitope Ogunsanya (NGR) | 11–2 | 11–3 | 11–3 | | |

== Knockout stage ==
Semifinals
Kim Daybell (ENG) | 11 | 8 | 11 | 6 | 11
Theo Cogill (RSA) | 8 | 11 | 5 | 11 | 6
Joshua Stacey (WAL) | 12 | 2 | 12 | 9
Ross Wilson (ENG) | 10 | 11 | 14 | 11

Gold medal match
Kim Daybell (ENG) | 11 | 10 | 3 | 7
Ross Wilson (ENG) | 7 | 12 | 11 | 11
Bronze medal match
Theo Cogill (RSA) | 11 | 4 | 6 | 13 | 8
Joshua Stacey (WAL) | 8 | 11 | 11 | 11 | 11
