= Table tennis at the 2018 Commonwealth Games – Women's team =

Table tennis – Women's team at the 2018 Commonwealth Games
- Venue: Scotstoun Sports Campus
- Dates: 5 – 8 April 2018

Medalists
gold medal	Manika Batra; Mouma Das; Sutirtha Mukherjee; Madhurika Patkar; Pooja Sahasrabudhe	India
silver medal	Feng Tianwei; Lin Ye; Yu Mengyu; Wanling Zhang; Zhou Yihan	Singapore
bronze medal	Tin-Tin Ho; Kelly Sibley; Maria Tsaptsinos; Denise Payet	England

Table tennis women's team at the 2018 Commonwealth Games was held at the Oxenford Studios on the Gold Coast, Australia from April 5 to 8.

== Group stage ==
- 2 points were awarded for won tie, and 1 point for lost tie.

=== Group 1 ===
Team	Pld	TW	TL	MW	ML	GW	GL	PW	PL	Pts	Qualification
Singapore	2	2	0	6	0	18	1	209	96	4	Knockout stage
Malaysia	2	1	1	3	3	9	9	157	141	3	Knockout stage
Fiji	2	0	2	0	6	1	18	76	205	2	

5 April 2018; 09:30	Singapore	3–0	Malaysia	Oxenford Studios, Gold Coast

report	Individual matches
Feng Tianwei	3–0	Ho Ying	11–3, 11–3, 11–6
Yu Mengyu	3–0	Alice Chang Li Sian	11–4, 12–10, 12–10
Zhou Yihan / Yu Mengyu	3–0	Karen Lyne / Ho Ying	11–6, 11–5, 13–11

5 April 2018; 16:00	Singapore	3–0	Fiji	Oxenford Studios, Gold Coast

report	Individual matches
Zhou Yihan	3–0	Grace Yee	11–2, 11–3, 11–3
Zhang Wanling	3–0	Sally Yee	11–2, 11–6, 11–1
Lin Ye / Zhang Wanling	3–1	Li Xuan / Sally Yee	11–3, 7–11, 11–1, 11–6,

6 April 2018; 09:30	Fiji	0–3	Malaysia	Oxenford Studios, Gold Coast

report	Individual matches
Li Xuan	0–3	Ho Ying	5–11, 2–11, 7–11
Grace Yee	0–3	Alice Chang Li Sian	7–11, 2–11, 5–11
Sally Yee / Grace Yee	0–3	Karen Lyne / Ho Ying	3–11,4 –11, 3–11

=== Group 2 ===
Team	Pld	TW	TL	MW	ML	GW	GL	PW	PL	Pts	Qualification
India	2	2	0	6	1	20	4	254	160	4	Knockout stage
Wales	2	1	1	4	4	15	12	261	262	3	Knockout stage
Sri Lanka	2	0	2	1	6	3	22	151	254	2	

5 April 2018; 09:30	India	3–0	Sri Lanka	Oxenford Studios, Gold Coast

report	Individual matches
Manika Batra	3–0	Erandi Warusawithana	11–3, 11–5, 11–3
Sutirtha Mukherjee	3–0	Ishara Manikku Badu	11–5, 11–8, 11–4
Pooja Sahasrabudhe / Sutirtha Mukherjee	3–0	Hansani Kapugeekiyana / Ishara Manikku Badu	11–6, 11–7, 11–3

5 April 2018; 16:00	India	3–1	Wales	Oxenford Studios, Gold Coast

report	Individual matches
Manika Batra	3–1	Charlotte Carey	11–8, 8–11, 11–5, 11–4
Mouma Das	3–0	Chloe Thomas	12–10, 11–7, 11–7
Madhurika Patkar / Mouma Das	2–3	Anna Hursey / Charlotte Carey	8–11, 5–11, 11–5, 11–7, 11–13
Madhurika Patkar	3–0	Chloe Thomas	11–3, 11–4, 12–10

6 April 2018; 09:30	Wales	3–1	Sri Lanka	Oxenford Studios, Gold Coast

report	Individual matches
Charlotte Carey	3–0	Erandi Warusawithana	11–4, 11–6, 11–7
Anna Hursey	2–3	Ishara Manikku Badu	9–11, 7–11, 11–7, 12–10, 7–11
Chloe Thomas / Anna Hursey	3–0	Hansani Kapugeekiyana / Ishara Manikku Badu	11–8, 11–9, 11–6
Charlotte Carey	3–0	Hansani Kapugeekiyana	11–4, 11–5, 11–8

=== Group 3 ===
Team	Pld	TW	TL	MW	ML	GW	GL	PW	PL	Pts	Qualification
Australia	2	2	0	6	1	20	7	270	212	4	Knockout stage
Canada	2	1	1	4	3	16	11	267	206	3	Knockout stage
Mauritius	2	0	2	0	6	0	18	79	198	2	

5 April 2018; 09:30	Australia	3–0	Mauritius	Oxenford Studios, Gold Coast

report	Individual matches
Jian Fang Lay	3–0	Ruqayyah Kinoo	11–1, 11–7, 11–7
Tracy Feng	3–0	Sanjana Alix Ramasawmy	11–5, 11–6, 11–1
Melissa Tapper / Tracy Feng	3–0	Elodie Ho Wan Kau / Sanjana Alix Ramasawmy	11–4, 11–7, 11–6

5 April 2018; 16:00	Australia	3–1	Canada	Oxenford Studios, Gold Coast

report	Individual matches
Tracy Feng	3–2	Alicia Cote	5–11, 11–9, 8–11, 11–8, 11–9
Jian Fang Lay	2–3	Zhang Mo	4–11, 11–9, 8–11, 11–9, 9–11
Miao Miao / Jian Fang Lay	3–0	Justina Yeung / Alicia Cote	11–9, 11–8, 11–5
Miao Miao	3–2	Zhang Mo	4–11, 11–6, 11–8, 12–14, 11–8

6 April 2018; 09:30	Canada	3–0	Mauritius	Oxenford Studios, Gold Coast

report	Individual matches
Alicia Cote	3–0	Eledie Ho Wan Kau	11–5, 11–4, 11–7
Zhang Mo	3–0	Sanjana Alix Ramasawmy	11–2, 11–5, 11–1
Jestina Yeung / Alicia Cote	3–0	Kinoo Ruqayyah / Sanjana Alix Ramasawmy	11–5, 11–2, 11–4

=== Group 4 ===
Team	Pld	TW	TL	MW	ML	GW	GL	PW	PL	Pts	Qualification
England	2	2	0	6	0	18	0	199	80	4	Knockout stage
Guyana	2	1	1	3	5	9	15	181	215	3	Knockout stage
Vanuatu	2	0	2	2	6	6	18	157	242	2	

5 April 2018; 09:30	England	3–0	Guyana	Oxenford Studios, Gold Coast

report	Individual matches
Tin-Tin Ho	3–0	Natalie Cummings	11–5, 11–5, 11–3
Kelly Sibley	3–0	Trenace Lowe	11–2, 11–9, 11–6
Maria Tsaptsinos / Kelly Sibley	3–0	Priscilla Greaves / Natalie Cummings	11–1, 11–5, 11–3

5 April 2018; 16:00	England	3–0	Vanuatu	Oxenford Studios, Gold Coast

report	Individual matches
Tin-Tin Ho	3–0	Priscilla Tommy	11–2, 11–6, 11–7
Kelly Sibley	3–0	Stephanie Qwea	11–1, 11–2, 11–2
Maria Tsaptsinos / Kelly Sibley	3–0	Anolyn Lulu / Priscilla Tommy	11–6, 12–10, 11–5

6 April 2018; 09:30	Vanuatu	2–3	Guyana	Oxenford Studios, Gold Coast

report	Individual matches
Priscilla Tommy	3–0	Trenace Lowe	11–8, 11–6, 11–7
Stephanie Qwea	0–3	Natalie Cummings	7–11, 6–11, 5–11
Anolyn Lulu / Priscilla Tommy	3–0	Priscilla Greaves / Natalie Cummings	11–7, 11–9, 11–6
Anolyn Lulu	0–3	Trenace Lowe	5–11, 9–11, 3–11
Stephanie Qwea	0–3	Priscilla Greaves	7–11, 5–11, 3–11

== Knockout stage ==
=== Bracket ===
Quarterfinals
6 April
Singapore	3
Guyana	0
6 April
Wales	1
Australia	3
7 April
England	3
Canada	1
7 April
Malaysia	0
India	3

Semifinals
8 April
Singapore	3
Australia	0
8 April
England	0
India	3

Final
8 April
Singapore	1
India	3
Bronze medal
8 April
Australia	1
England	3

=== Quarterfinals ===
6 April 2018; 16:00	Singapore	3–0	Guyana	Oxenford Studios, Gold Coast

report	Individual matches
Yu Mengyu	3–0	Trenace Lowe	11–3, 11–2, 11–3
Lin Ye	3–1	Natalie Cummings	11–5, 11–2, 9–11, 11–4
Zhou Yihan / Lin Ye	3–0	Priscilla Greaves / Natalie Cummings	11–2, 11–4, 11–2

6 April 2018; 16:00	Wales	1–3	Australia	Oxenford Studios, Gold Coast

report	Individual matches
Charlotte Carey	3–1	Jian Fang Lay	4–11, 11–6, 11–8, 15–13
Chloe Thomas	0–3	Melissa Tapper	8–11, 4–11, 3–11
Anna Hursey / Chloe Thomas	0–3	Miao Miao / Jian Fang Lay	8–11, 2–11, 2–11
Charlotte Carey	2–3	Miao Miao	11–5, 4–11, 11–13, 11–8, 3–11

7 April 2018; 09:30	England	3–1	Canada	Oxenford Studios, Gold Coast

report	Individual matches
Kelly Sibley	1–3	Zhang Mo	11–5, 8–11, 4–11, 9–11
Tin-Tin Ho	3–2	Alicia Cote	11–8, 7–11, 11–6, 9–11, 11–5
Maria Tsaptsinos / Kelly Sibley	3–2	Justina Yeung / Alicia Cote	11–6, 11–4, 7–11, 5–11, 11–4
Tin-Tin Ho	3–1	Justina Yeung	11–4, 8–11, 11–3, 11–8

7 April 2018; 09:30	Malaysia	0–3	India	Oxenford Studios, Gold Coast

report	Individual matches
Ho Ying	0–3	Manika Batra	9–11, 7–11, 7–11
Karen Lyne	1–3	Madhurika Patkar	11–7, 9–11, 9–11, 3–11
Tee Ai Xin / Ho Ying	1–3	Mouma Das / Madhurika Patkar	8–11, 12–10, 8–11, 7–11

=== Semifinals ===
8 April 2018; 07:30	Singapore	3–0	Australia	Oxenford Studios, Gold Coast

Report	Individual matches
Feng Tianwei	3–0	Melissa Tapper	11–3, 11–9, 11–7
Yu Mengyu	3–0	Jian Fang Lay	11–6, 11–3, 11–8
Zhou Yihan / Yu Mengyu	3–0	Miao Miao / Jian Fang Lay	11–8, 11–7, 11–8

8 April 2018; 10:45	England	0–3	India	Oxenford Studios, Gold Coast

Report	Individual matches
Kelly Sibley	1–3	Manika Batra	11–9, 7–11, 5–11, 7–11
Tin-Tin Ho	1–3	Madhurika Patkar	7–11, 11–13, 12–10, 8–11
Maria Tsaptsinos / Kelly Sibley	1–3	Mouma Das / Madhurika Patkar	7–11, 11–8, 7–11, 1–11

=== Bronze medal ===
8 April 2018; 16:00	Australia	1–3	England	Oxenford Studios, Gold Coast

report	Individual matches
Melissa Tapper	2–3	Tin-Tin Ho	4–11, 11–8, 3–11, 11–7, 8–11
Jian Fang Lay	3–2	Kelly Sibley	5–11, 21–19, 5–11, 11–7, 11–7
Miao Miao / Jian Fang Lay	1–3	Maria Tsaptsinos / Kelly Sibley	2–11, 11–9, 9–11, 7–11
Miao Miao	2–3	Tin-Tin Ho	7–11, 11–9, 12–14, 13–11, 6–11

=== Final ===
8 April 2018; 18:30	Singapore	1–3	India	Oxenford Studios, Gold Coast

report	Individual matches
Feng Tianwei	2–3	Manika Batra	8–11, 11–8, 11–7, 9–11, 7–11
Yu Mengyu	3–0	Madhurika Patkar	13–11, 11–2, 11–6
Zhou Yihan/Yu Mengyu	1–3	Mouma Das / Madhurika Patkar	7–11, 6–11, 11–8, 7–11
Zhou Yihan	0–3	Manika Batra	7–11, 4–11, 7–11
