= Table tennis at the 2022 Asian Games – Women's doubles =

Women's doubles at the 2022 Asian Games
- Venue: Gongshu Canal Sports Park Gymnasium
- Dates: 28 September – 2 October 2023
- Competitors: 64 from 19 nations

Medalists
gold medal	Jeon Ji-hee; Shin Yu-bin	South Korea
silver medal	Cha Su-yong; Pak Su-gyong	North Korea
bronze medal	Miwa Harimoto; Miyuu Kihara	Japan
bronze medal	Sutirtha Mukherjee; Ayhika Mukherjee	India

The women's doubles table tennis event was part of the table tennis programme and took place between 28 September and 2 October 2023, at the Gongshu Canal Sports Park Gymnasium.

== Schedule ==
All times are China Standard Time (UTC+08:00)

Date	Time	Event
Thursday, 28 September 2023	16:00	Round of 32
Friday, 29 September 2023	16:00	Round of 16
Saturday, 30 September 2023	17:00	Quarterfinals
Monday, 2 October 2023	12:00	Semifinals
Monday, 2 October 2023	18:30	Final

== Results ==
=== Finals ===
Semifinals									Final
1	Jeon Ji-hee (KOR); Shin Yu-bin (KOR)	9	11	11	11	11
5	Miwa Harimoto (JPN); Miyuu Kihara (JPN)	11	8	8	7	7			1	Jeon Ji-hee (KOR); Shin Yu-bin (KOR)	11	11	10	12	11
	Cha Su-yong (PRK); Pak Su-gyong (PRK)	7	11	7	11	11	5	11		Cha Su-yong (PRK); Pak Su-gyong (PRK)	6	4	12	10	3
8	Sutirtha Mukherjee (IND); Ayhika Mukherjee (IND)	11	8	11	8	9	11	2

=== Top half ===
==== Section 1 ====
Round of 32
1	Jeon Ji-hee (KOR); Shin Yu-bin (KOR)	11	11	11
Orawan Paranang (THA); Suthasini Sawettabut (THA)	5	9	7
Kim Kum-yong (PRK); Pyon Song-gyong (PRK)	11	11	11
Hoor Fawad (PAK); Perniya Zaman Khan (PAK)	0	0	1
Sarvinoz Mirkadirova (KAZ); Angelina Romanovskaya (KAZ)	11	11	11
Malak Khoury (LBN); Mariana Sahakian (LBN)	9	8	8
Goi Rui Xuan (SGP); Ser Lin Qian (SGP)	8	8	2
7	Chen Szu-yu (TPE); Huang Yi-hua (TPE)	11	11	11

Round of 16
1	Jeon Ji-hee (KOR); Shin Yu-bin (KOR)	11	5	11	12
Kim Kum-yong (PRK); Pyon Song-gyong (PRK)	4	11	9	10
Sarvinoz Mirkadirova (KAZ); Angelina Romanovskaya (KAZ)	3	11	3	9
7	Chen Szu-yu (TPE); Huang Yi-hua (TPE)	11	8	11	11

Quarterfinals
1	Jeon Ji-hee (KOR); Shin Yu-bin (KOR)	9	11	11	11
7	Chen Szu-yu (TPE); Huang Yi-hua (TPE)	11	6	6	4

==== Section 2 ====
Round of 32
5	Miwa Harimoto (JPN); Miyuu Kihara (JPN)	11	11	11
Batbayaryn Doljinzuu (MGL); Övgönbürgediin Baljinnyam (MGL)	4	5	8
Sreeja Akula (IND); Diya Chitale (IND)	11	15	11
Trần Mai Ngọc (VIE); Nguyễn Thị Nga (VIE)	8	13	6
Lee Ho Ching (HKG); Li Ching Wan (HKG)	11	11	11
Cheong Chi Hun (MAC); Seak Hui Li (MAC)	5	7	6
Markhabo Magdieva (UZB); Rozalina Khadjieva (UZB)	1	4	1
3	Sun Yingsha (CHN); Wang Manyu (CHN)	11	11	11

Round of 16
5	Miwa Harimoto (JPN); Miyuu Kihara (JPN)	11	11	11
Sreeja Akula (IND); Diya Chitale (IND)	3	5	8
Lee Ho Ching (HKG); Li Ching Wan (HKG)	2	3	3
3	Sun Yingsha (CHN); Wang Manyu (CHN)	11	11	11

Quarterfinals
5	Miwa Harimoto (JPN); Miyuu Kihara (JPN)	11	5	11	11
3	Sun Yingsha (CHN); Wang Manyu (CHN)	9	11	7	9

=== Bottom half ===
==== Section 3 ====
Round of 32
4	Cheng I-ching (TPE); Li Yu-jhun (TPE)	11	11	11
Laisa Fathuhulla Ismail (MDV); Aishath Rafa Nazim (MDV)	5	2	8
Cha Su-yong (PRK); Pak Su-gyong (PRK)	11	11	11
Batmönkhiin Bolor-Erdene (MGL); Mönkhbatyn Undram (MGL)	7	4	5
Lee Eun-hye (KOR); Yang Ha-eun (KOR)	11	11	11
Maryam Al-Aali (BRN); Amruta Phadke (BRN)	2	3	9
Kuan Cheok Lam (MAC); Lei Man In (MAC)	3	0	1
6	Doo Hoi Kem (HKG); Zhu Chengzhu (HKG)	11	11	11

Round of 16
4	Cheng I-ching (TPE); Li Yu-jhun (TPE)	11	10	8	11	10
Cha Su-yong (PRK); Pak Su-gyong (PRK)	6	12	11	8	12
Lee Eun-hye (KOR); Yang Ha-eun (KOR)	11	11	3	6	8
6	Doo Hoi Kem (HKG); Zhu Chengzhu (HKG)	3	9	11	11	11

Quarterfinals
Cha Su-yong (PRK); Pak Su-gyong (PRK)	12	8	6	11	11
6	Doo Hoi Kem (HKG); Zhu Chengzhu (HKG)	10	11	11	6	8

==== Section 4 ====
Round of 32
8	Sutirtha Mukherjee (IND); Ayhika Mukherjee (IND)	11	11	11
Zauresh Akasheva (KAZ); Anastassiya Lavrova (KAZ)	7	4	7
Nguyễn Khoa Diệu Khánh (VIE); Nguyễn Thùy Kiều My (VIE)	1	7	6
Wanwisa Aueawiriyayothin (THA); Jinnipa Sawettabut (THA)	11	11	11
Wong Xin Ru (SGP); Zhou Jingyi (SGP)	3	5	6
Miu Hirano (JPN); Miyu Nagasaki (JPN)	11	11	11
Nabita Shrestha (NEP); Sikka Suwal Shrestha (NEP)	3	4	1
2	Chen Meng (CHN); Wang Yidi (CHN)	11	11	11

Round of 16
8	Sutirtha Mukherjee (IND); Ayhika Mukherjee (IND)	11	11	11
Wanwisa Aueawiriyayothin (THA); Jinnipa Sawettabut (THA)	8	7	4
Miu Hirano (JPN); Miyu Nagasaki (JPN)	8	3	7
2	Chen Meng (CHN); Wang Yidi (CHN)	11	11	11

Quarterfinals
8	Sutirtha Mukherjee (IND); Ayhika Mukherjee (IND)	11	11	5	11
2	Chen Meng (CHN); Wang Yidi (CHN)	5	5	11	9
