= Maria Tsaptsinos =

English table tennis player

Personal information
- Nationality: British
- Born: 21 July 1997 (age 29) Reading, England
- Height: 1.65 m (5 ft 5 in)
- Weight: 60 kg (130 lb; 9.4 st)

Sport
- Sport: Table tennis
- Playing style: Shakehand, attacking
- Highest ranking: 149 (May 2019)
- Current ranking: 196
Medal record
Women's table tennis
Representing England
Commonwealth Games
Bronze medal – third place	2018 Gold Coast	Team

Maria Tsaptsinos (born 21 July 1997) is an English table tennis player. She competed for England in the Women's Team event at the 2018 Commonwealth Games where she won a bronze medal alongside teammates Tin-Tin Ho and Kelly Sibley. Tsaptsinos and Ho also competed in the Women's Doubles, reaching the quarter-finals.

At English national level, Tsaptsinos has won the senior title for women's doubles five times in a row - from 2015 to 2017 with Tin-Tin Ho, in 2018 with Kelly Sibley and in 2019 again with Ho. She also twice won the singles title for Under 21s, in 2014 and 2016. In 2019, she won the women's singles title for the first time.

Tsaptsinos was supported while in education by Sport England's Talented Athlete Scholarship Scheme (TASS). In July 2018 she was named as the winner of the TASS Star of the Year award for outstanding achievement in sport and/or study.

== See also ==
- List of England players at the World Team Table Tennis Championships
