= Tin-Tin Ho =

British table tennis player

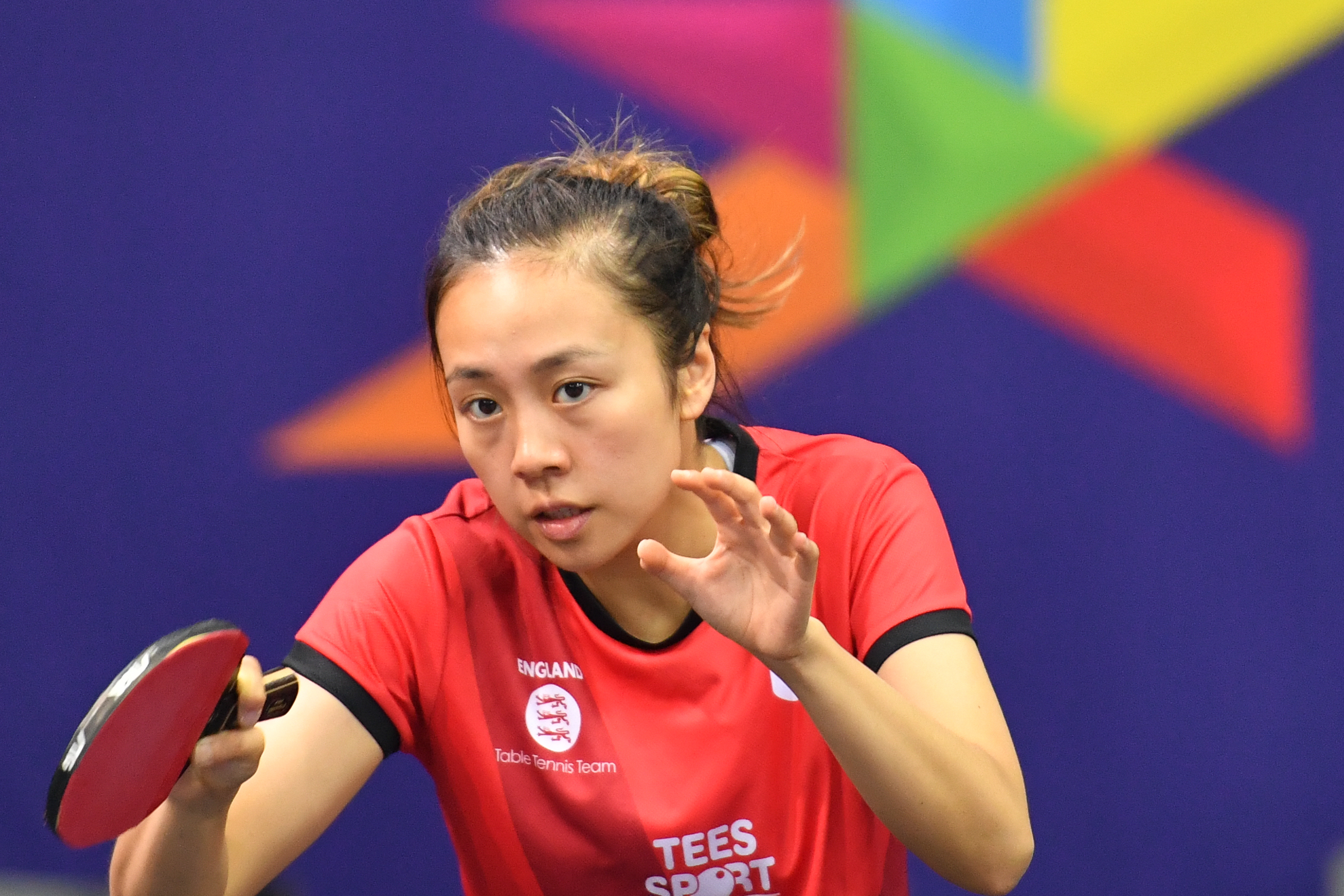

Personal information
- Nationality: British
- Born: 3 September 1998 (age 28) London, England
- Height: 1.59 m (5 ft 2 1/2 in)
- Weight: 50 kg (110 lb; 7.9 st)

Sport
- Sport: Table tennis
- Playing style: Penholder
- Highest ranking: 80 (September 2026)
- Current ranking: 81 (5 October 2026)
Medal record
Representing England
Women's table tennis
Commonwealth Games
Silver medal – second place	2014 Glasgow	Mixed doubles
Silver medal – second place	2018 Gold Coast	Mixed doubles
Bronze medal – third place	2018 Gold Coast	Women's team

Tin-Tin Ho (born 3 September 1998) is an English table tennis player, born and raised in London. She has won multiple national titles, as well as two Commonwealth silver medals, and appeared at the 2020 Summer Olympics.

== Career ==
=== 2014 Commonwealth Games ===
She competed for England in the mixed doubles event at the 2014 Commonwealth Games, where she won a silver medal with partner Liam Pitchford.

=== National champion ===
In March 2016, at the age of 17, she won her first national women's singles title, when she also retained the women's doubles and mixed doubles titles.

=== 2018 Commonwealth Games ===
At the 2018 Commonwealth Games in Gold Coast, Australia, Ho and Pitchford repeated their silver medal from four years earlier and she was also part of the England squad which won team bronze, alongside Kelly Sibley, Maria Tsaptsinos and Denise Payet.

=== 2020 Summer Olympics ===
In qualifying for the delayed 2020 Summer Olympics, Ho became the first British woman since Atlanta 1996 to qualify for an Olympic games in the single's table tennis event. She lost in the first round to Manika Batra of India.

=== Post 2020 Olympics ===
In 2024, she won a 6th women's singles, 7th women's doubles and 7th mixed doubles title at the English National Table Tennis Championships, held at the David Ross Sports Village in Nottingham, to go into third place in the all-time list of winners for the event.

== Personal life ==
Ho is of Hong Kong descent, and her father named her Tin-Tin so that her name would have the same initials as "table-tennis". Her father had originally intended to name her Pong, to match the forename of her brother.

== See also ==
- List of England players at the World Team Table Tennis Championships
