= Barak Mizrachi =

Australian para table tennis player

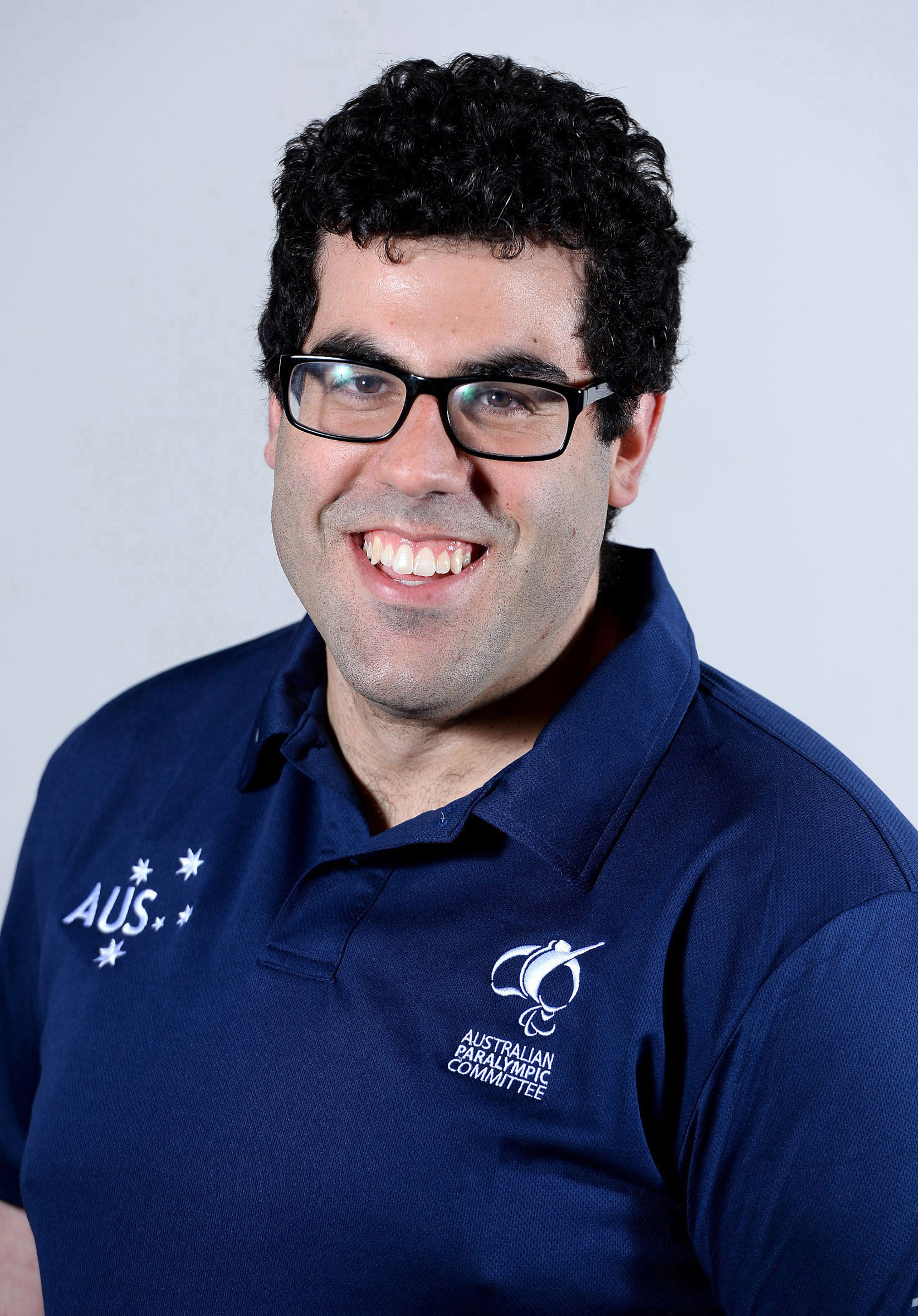
- 2016 Australian Paralympic team portrait of Barak Mizrachi

Personal information
- Nicknames: B, Pres, The Moose
- Nationality: Australian
- Born: 22 March 1988 (age 38) Carnegie, Victoria
- Height: 179 cm (5 ft 10 in)

Sport
- Country: Australia
- Sport: Table tennis
- Club: Maccabi TTC

Achievements and titles
- Highest world ranking: 24th

Barak Mizrachi (born 22 March 1988) is an Australian Paralympic table tennis player. After playing competitive table tennis for the first time in 2001, he went on to make his international debut in 2003 at the Maccabiah Games. He has since represented Australia at the Maccabiah Games in 2005, 2007 and 2009, before being selected for the 2016 Summer Paralympics.

== Personal ==
Mizrachi was born on 22 March 1988 in Carnegie, Victoria. He was born with cerebral palsy right hemiplegia which affects the right side of his body. Outside of table tennis Mizrachi works as a gas engineer.

== Table tennis ==
Mizrachi is a class 8 table tennis player meaning that he competes whilst standing. As a child he started playing table tennis with his father. Mizrachi played the sport throughout high school before getting involved with the Maccabi Club. After playing his first competitive game in 2001, he made his debut in 2003, whilst competing at the Maccabiah Games (a multi sport tournament for Jewish competitors from around the world) an experience he recalls as a thrill making him never want to stop playing for Australia. However, it was not until 2015 that he took his first firm steps towards the 2016 Summer Paralympics in Rio de Janeiro, when Mizrachi defeated the favourite on his way to winning at the Oceania Para-Table Tennis Championships. It was also in this tournament that he was awarded the best and fairest award. Barak also made history in 2013 when he became the first Australian with a disability to be selected in the Australian team to compete at the Summer Universiade in Russia. In 2016, Barak Mizrachi was selected for the 2016 Summer Paralympics.

At the 2016 Rio Paralympics, he narrowly was defeated in both matches, in the Men's Singles Class 8 and missed the opportunity to advance.

== Recognition ==
- Selected for the 2016 Rio Paralympics
- Awarded Best and Fairest at the Oceania Para-Table Tennis Championships in 2015
- 2012 National AWD Championships – dual gold medallist
- 2011 National AWD Championships – four-time gold medallist
- 2004 Victorian Junior State Team Member
- 2011 Oceania Paralympic Championships – dual gold medallist (M8 Singles/Teams)
- 2011 Asia/Oceania Regional Championships – bronze medallist (M8 Teams)
- 4 time Australian representative to Maccabiah Games (2003, 2005, 2007, 2009)
