= Denise Payet =

English table tennis player

Personal information
- Nationality: England
- Born: 6 July 2001 (age 25) London, England

Sport
- Sport: Table tennis
- Club: Urbanspin/Ellenborough
- Highest ranking: 303 (December 2018)
- Current ranking: 355
Medal record
Women's table tennis
Representing England
Commonwealth Games
Bronze medal – third place	2018 Gold Coast	Women's team

Denise Payet is a female international table tennis player from England.

== Table tennis career ==
She represented England at the 2018 World Team Table Tennis Championships (Corbillon Cup women's team event) with Maria Tsaptsinos and Tin-Tin Ho. She then went on to win a bronze medal at the 2018 Commonwealth Games in the Women's team event. alongside Kelly Sibley, Tsaptsinos and Tin-Tin Ho.

== See also ==
- List of England players at the World Team Table Tennis Championships
