= Pooja Sahasrabudhe =

Indian tennis player (born 1991)

Personal information
- Nickname: Poo
- Nationality: Indian
- Born: 13 September 1991 (age 35) Thane, India
- Height: 1.68 m (5 ft 6 in)

Sport
- Sport: Table tennis
- Club: Boosters TT Club, Radiant Sports Academy
- Playing style: Right-handed ShakeHand Grip
Medal record
Women's table tennis
Representing India
Commonwealth Games
Gold medal – first place	2018 Gold Coast	Women's team
South Asian Games
Gold medal – first place	2016 Guwahati/Shillong	Women's doubles

Pooja Sahasrabudhe is an Indian table tennis player from Thane, Maharashtra. She comes from a humble middle-class background, and was born and brought up in Thane, Maharashtra. She took to Table tennis at the age of 9 in the year 2000 and showed keen interest and great talent in the sport. Her coach Mrs. Shailaja Gohad at the Boosters TT Academy, was quick to notice this and it was under her guidance that Pooja groomed as a player. She started representing India at a very young age. Pooja did her schooling and graduation from Thane and was absorbed by ONGC in the year 2010. Pooja recently got married and moved to Pune, India where she continues to train under the guidance of Mr. Rohit Chaudhary - a Shiv Chatrapatee Awardee and her husband Mr. Aniket Koparkar - an ex-international himself.

She has won the Singles National Championship in the U-17 and U-21 events and as of February 2016 she is ranked no.3 in India in the Women's Singles Category and is currently a member of the Indian National Women's Table Tennis Team

== Career highlights ==
- U-17 Junior Girls Singles National Champion 2006–07 at Cuttak, India
- Silver Medal in the Women's Doubles Event at the Commonwealth Youth Games 2008 held at Pune India
- U-21 Youth Girls Singles National Champion 2009–10 at Raipur, India
- Gold Medal in Women's Team Event and silver medal in Women's Doubles event at the 2010 South Asian Games
- Bronze Medal at the ITTF World Tour, Morocco Open
- Gold Medal in Women Team Event and bronze medal in Women's Doubles at 3rd Fajr Cup 2014, Tehran Iran
- Member of the Indian National Women's Table Tennis Team for the 2014 World Team Table Tennis Championships at Tokyo Japan
- Member of the Indian National Women's Team for the Asian Table Tennis Championships 2015 at Pattaya Thailand
- Gold Medal in Team Event (part of PSPB team), Gold Medal in Mixed Doubles along with fellow PSPB teammate Harmeet Desai and Silver Medal in the Women's Singles Event at the 77th Senior National and Inter-State Table Tennis Championships at Hyderabad India
- 2 Gold Medals in Team Event and in Mixed Doubles event at the 2016 South Asian Games held at Shillong India
- Member of the Indian National Women's Table Tennis Team for the 2016 World Team Table Tennis Championships at Kuala Lumpur Malaysia
- Won gold medal in 2018 Commonwealth Games in Women's team event with Manika Batra, Mouma Das, Sutirtha Mukherjee & Madhurika Patkar.
