= Kim Daybell =

British para table tennis player

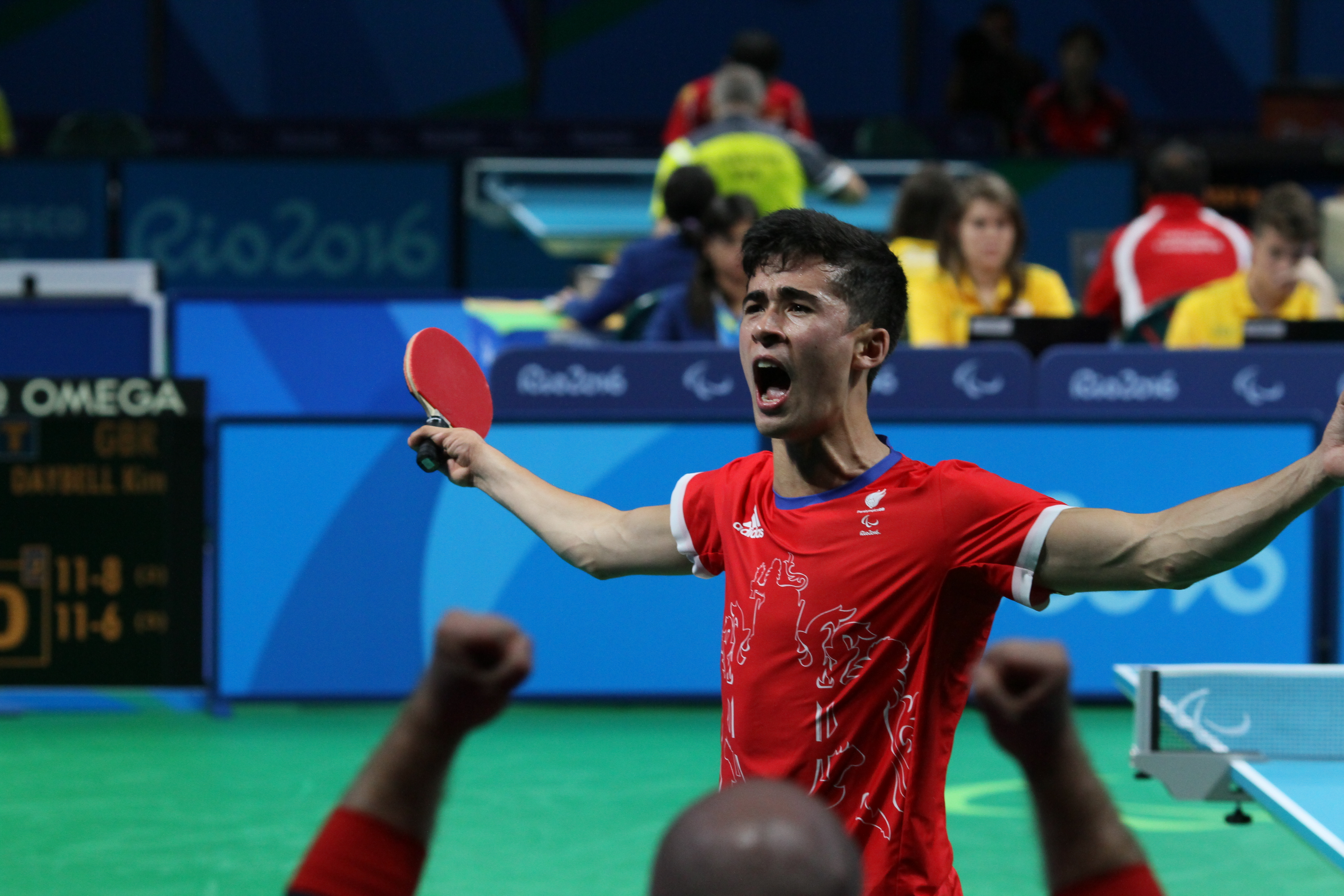

Personal information
- Born: 11 August 1992 (age 33) Sheffield, England, Great Britain
- Education: Leeds University
- Height: 182 cm (6 ft 0 in)
- Weight: 79 kg (174 lb)

Sport
- Country: United Kingdom
- Sport: Para table tennis
- Disability: Poland syndrome
- Disability class: C10
- Club: British Para Table Tennis Association
Medal record
Para table tennis
Representing England
Commonwealth Games
Silver medal – second place	2018 Gold Coast	Men's singles TT6-10
Representing United Kingdom
European Championships
Silver medal – second place	2017 Lasko	Men's teams C10
Bronze medal – third place	2019 Helsingborg	Men's teams C10

Kim Daybell (born 11 August 1992) is a British para table tennis player who competed in international level events.

He has retired from international para table tennis to fight against the COVID-19 pandemic.

Daybell is a junior doctor at Whittington Hospital in north London and is working to mitigate the COVID-19 pandemic.
