= Sutirtha Mukherjee =

Indian table tennis player

Personal information
- Born: 10 October 1995 (age 31) Naihati, West Bengal, India
- Height: 1.60 m (5 ft 3 in)

Sport
- Sport: Table tennis
- Playing style: Right-handed shakehand
- Highest ranking: 75 (June 2024)
- Current ranking: 89 (5 November 2024)
Medal record
Women's table tennis
Representing India
Asian Games
Bronze medal – third place	2022 Hangzhou	Doubles
Asian Championships
Bronze medal – third place	2024 Astana	Team
Bronze medal – third place	2024 Astana	Doubles
Commonwealth Games
Gold medal – first place	2018 Gold Coast	Team
South Asian Games
Gold medal – first place	2019 Kathmandu	Singles
Gold medal – first place	2019 Kathmandu	Mixed doubles
Gold medal – first place	2019 Kathmandu	Team
Silver medal – second place	2019 Kathmandu	Doubles

Sutirtha Mukherjee (born 10 October 1995) is an Indian table tennis player from West Bengal. She has won national table tennis championship and also was a part of gold medal-winning Indian women's team at the 2018 Commonwealth Games. Mukherjee also represented India at the 2020 Summer Olympics and 2022 Asian Games. She won the bronze medal for India in women's doubles table tennis in the 2022 Asian Games.

== Career ==
Mukherjee represented India and began winning titles in ITTF junior events in 2012. She was registered as a player born on 10 October 1997 and made it to participate in the 2014 Summer Youth Olympics, which was eligible for athletes born between 1996 and 1999. The Central Bureau of Investigation in 2014 initiated an inquiry against several table tennis players for allegedly participating in underage categories of competitions by producing forged age records. After the matter was probed in 2016, the Table Tennis Federation of India banned Mukherjee for a year for allegedly fudging her age record.

In 2018, Mukherjee won women's singles title at the Senior National Table Tennis Championships in India and became a part of gold medal-winning Indian women's team at the 2018 Commonwealth Games.

In 2021, Mukherjee represented India at the 2020 Summer Olympics. Fellow compatriot Manika Batra accused Indian national coach Soumyadeep Roy of pressuring her to throw a match at the Olympic qualifiers (in March) to Mukherjee to allow Mukherjee to qualify. A committee composed of two former Supreme Court judges found that Roy had indeed tried to manipulate the match but found no evidence of Batra throwing the match away in an eventual loss to Mukherjee.

Sutirtha Mukherjee and Ayhika Mukherjee advanced to women's doubles final at the WTT Contender Muscat in 2022. The pair won their first WTT title at the WTT Contender Tunis 2023 by defeating South Korea's Shin Yu-bin and Jeon Ji-hee in the semifinal before a victory against Miyuu Kihara and Miwa Harimoto of Japan in the final. Later in the 2022 Asian Games, they defeated the Chinese Champions Chen Meng and Wang Yidi in the quarter finals, won a historical bronze medal for India before losing to North Korea's Cha Su-yong and Pak Su-gyong. At 2024 Asian Table Tennis Championships, Ayhika Mukherjee and Sutirtha Mukherjee won bronze medal by defeating South Korea's Lee Eun-hye and Kim Nayeong in the Quarterfinals. She was also a part of the women's team that clinched first ever bronze medal in the same tournament.
