= Manika Batra =

Indian table tennis player

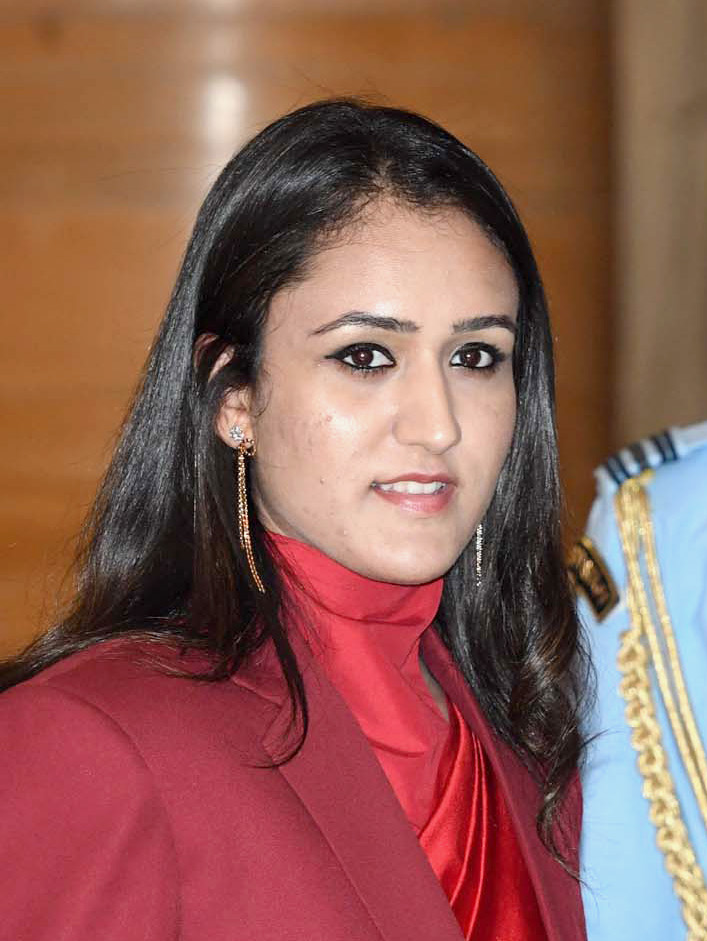
- Batra in 2018

Personal information
- Full name: Manika Batra
- Nationality: Indian
- Born: 15 June 1995 (age 31) Delhi, India
- Height: 1.80 m (5 ft 11 in)
- Weight: 67 kg (148 lb)

Sport
- Sport: Table tennis
- Club: Ahmedabad SG Pipers (2025–); Bengaluru Smashers (2023–2024); Mavericks Kolkata; (2019); Dabang Delhi; (2018); Stag Yoddhas; (2017)
- Playing style: Shakehand grip
- Highest ranking: 24 (May 2024)
- Current ranking: 53 (28 September 2026)
Medal record
Women's table tennis
Representing India
Commonwealth Games
Gold medal – first place	2018 Gold Coast	Women's team
Gold medal – first place	2018 Gold Coast	Women's singles
Silver medal – second place	2018 Gold Coast	Women's doubles
Bronze medal – third place	2018 Gold Coast	Mixed doubles
Asian Games
Bronze medal – third place	2018 Jakarta	Mixed doubles
Asian Championships
Bronze medal – third place	2024 Astana	Women's team
Asian Cup
Bronze medal – third place	2022 Bangkok	Women's singles
South Asian Games
Gold medal – first place	2016 Guwahati	Women's team
Gold medal – first place	2016 Guwahati	Women's doubles
Gold medal – first place	2016 Guwahati	Mixed doubles
Silver medal – second place	2016 Guwahati	Women's singles

Manika Batra (born 15 June 1995) is an Indian table tennis player. She is a triple gold medalist at the South Asian Games, a double gold medalist at the Commonwealth Games, and a bronze medalist at the Asian Games, Asian Championships, and Asian Cup. She is India's number two in women and her world rank is 27 as of Nov 2024.

Batra is the first Indian woman to have won a bronze at the Asian Cup. She is one of the players who uses a long pimple rubber. She was honored with the Major Dhyan Chand Khel Ratna in 2020.

== Early life ==
Batra was born on 15 June 1995 as the youngest of three children. She hails from Naraina Vihar in Delhi. She began playing table tennis at the age of four. Her sister Anchal and brother Sahil both played table tennis, with Anchal having an influence on her during her early playing career. After winning a match in a state-level under-8 tournament, Batra decided to train under coach Sandeep Gupta who suggested her to switch to Hans Raj Model School where he ran his academy. She turned down many modelling offers as a teenager.

When she was 16, she declined a scholarship to train at the Peter Karlsson Academy in Sweden. She studied at Jesus and Mary College, New Delhi for a year before dropping out to focus on table tennis.

== Career ==
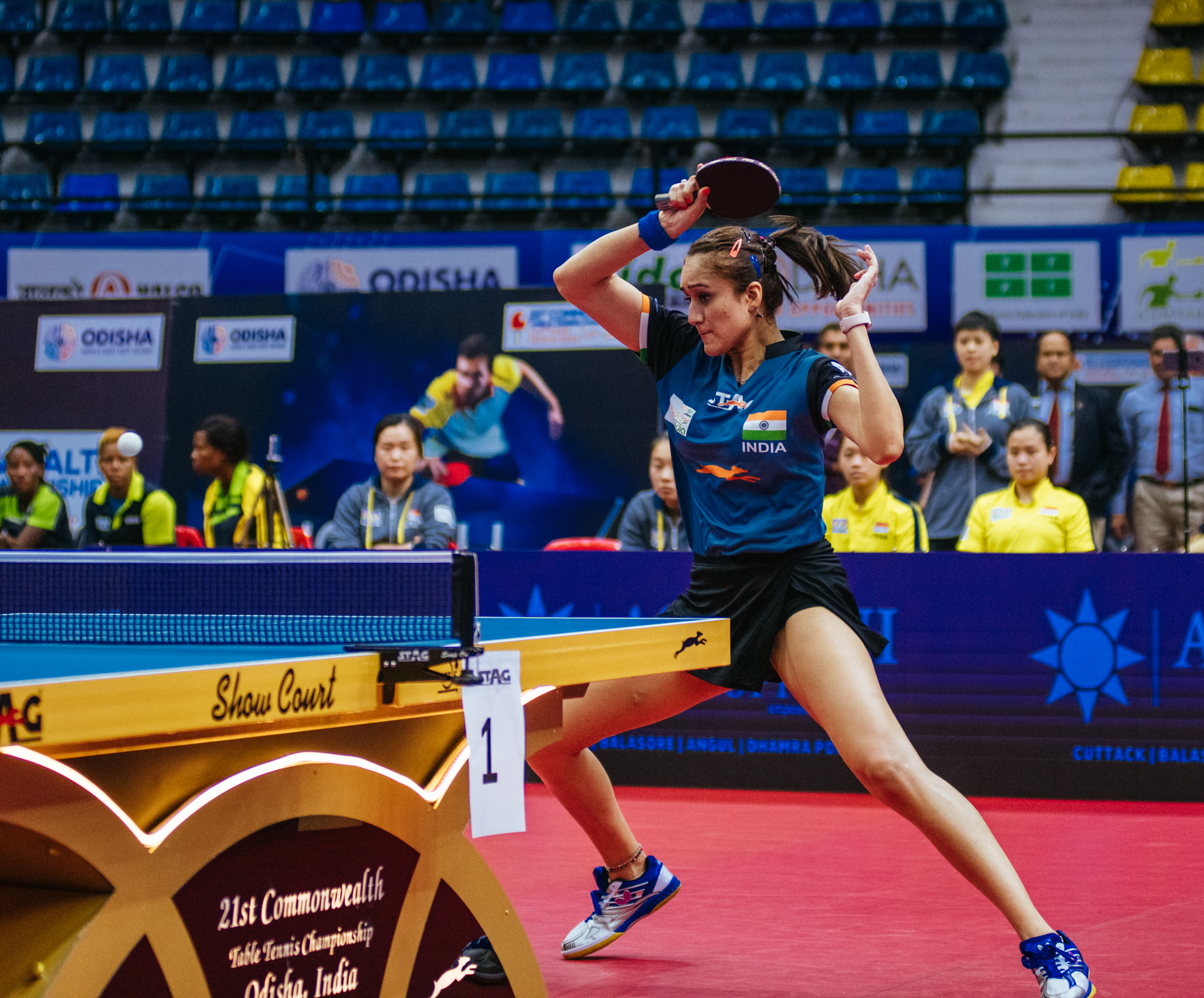
Manika Batra in action at 2019 Commonwealth Table Tennis Championships, Odisha, India

In 2011, Batra won the silver medal in the under-21 category of the Chile Open. She represented India at the 2014 Commonwealth Games at Glasgow, where she finished quarterfinalist, as well as the 2014 Asian Games. She won three medals at the 2015 Commonwealth Table Tennis Championships, winning silver in the women's team event (with Ankita Das and Mouma Das) as well as the women's doubles event (with Ankita Das) and bronze in the women's singles event.

Batra won three gold medals at the 2016 South Asian Games, winning the women's doubles event (with Pooja Sahasrabudhe), mixed doubles event (with Anthony Amalraj) and women's team event (with Mouma Das and Shamini Kumaresan). Batra was denied a fourth gold medal at the Games by Mouma Das, who defeated her in the final of the women's singles event.

=== 2016 Summer Olympics ===
Batra qualified for the women's singles event of the 2016 Summer Olympics by winning the South Asia group of the qualification tournament in April 2016. However, her appearance at the 2016 Olympics short-lived, as she lost to Katarzyna Grzybowska of Poland in the first round of the women's individual event.

Batra led the Indian women's team to a gold medal win in the final against four-time gold medalists and defending champions Singapore at the 2018 Commonwealth Games in Gold Coast, Australia. The Singapore women's table tennis team had never lost in the Commonwealth Games since the sport was inducted in the program in 2002. Batra defeated world number 4 Feng Tianwei as well as Zhou Yihan in India's 3–1 win in the final.

Batra and Mouma Das won India's maiden silver medal in the women's doubles category at the 2018 Commonwealth Games losing to defending champions Feng Tianwei and Yu Mengyu of Singapore in the gold medal clash. Batra became the first Indian woman to bag a commonwealth table tennis individual gold medal in CWG 2018 by beating Yu Mengyu of Singapore. She won 4 medals in 4 events she was participating out of which 2 are gold, 1 silver and 1 bronze medal.

At the 2019 Commonwealth Table Tennis Championships, Batra was the member of the women's team which win the gold by defeating Singapore in the final.

=== 2020 Summer Olympics ===
At the 2020 Summer Olympics, Batra reached the third round of the women's singles event, becoming the first Indian paddler to reach the third round at the Olympics in a singles event.

Batra won the 2021 WTT Contender Budapest mixed doubles with Sathiyan Gnanasekaran by outplaying Hungary's Dora Madarasz and Nandor Ecseki 3–1. Batra then won wtt contender Lasko 2021 women's doubles with Archana Girish Kamath by beating Diaz Sisters pair of Melanie Diaz and Adriana Diaz from Puerto Rico 11–3, 11–8, 12–10. The Indian duo saved four game points in the third set to seal the match.

=== 2022 ===
Batra participated at the 1st ever WTT Grand Smash event which was the Singapore Smash 2022. In the singles her run ended in the 1st round after losing to Zhang Mo. In the mixed doubles she and Sathiyan Gnanasekaran lost top seeds Lin Yun-ju and Cheng I Ching in straight games 3–0. In the women's doubles event she and Archana Girish Kamath lost to Japanese pair of Hina Hayata and Mima Itō 3–0 in the Quarter-finals.

Batra settled for silver at WTT Contender Doha 2022 with Sathiyan Gnanasekaran in mixed doubles where they lost against the top-seeded Chinese Taipei pair of Lin Yun-ju and Cheng I-Ching. The Indians lost 4–11, 5–11, 3–11 in straight games. Batra then bagged a bronze at WTT Star Contender Doha 2022 in women's doubles event with Archana Girish Kamath. They lost in the Semi-finals to Li Yu-Jhun and Cheng I-Ching 8–11, 6–11, 7–11.

On 5 April 2022, the pair of Batra and Archana Girish Kamath reached the pair ranking of world no. 4 which is the highest ever ranking by an Indian Table Tennis player in all categories (Men's Singles, Women's Singles, Men's Doubles, Women's Doubles, Mixed Doubles).

Manika won historic bronze medal in Asian Cup 2022 where she took down Top 10 paddlers - Chen Xingtong and Hina Hayata of China and Japan respectively.

=== 2024 ===
In the Round of 32 at Saudi Smash 2024, She defeated former World Champion & WR2 Wang Manyu of China, which is one of the biggest wins in her career. She cruised up to Quarter finals in that event, her best result ever in the Grand Smash events.

=== 2024 Summer Olympics ===
At the 2024 Summer Olympics, Batra reached the Round of 16 of the women's singles event by beating the home favourite Prithika Pavade, to become the first Indian paddler to reach the Round of 16 at the Olympics in a singles event. However, she lost 1–4 to Japan's Miu Hirano in five games. She qualified to Quarterfinals of WTT Champions Montpellier 2024 by beating Romania's Bernadette Szőcs and became the first Indian to do so in WTT Champions Events.

== In the media ==
Batra was featured on the cover of the July 2018 issue of Femina. She starred in the November 2018 edition of Vogue India. In 2024, she featured on the October cover of Cosmopolitan China.

== Awards and nominations ==
Year	Award	Category	Result	Ref(s)
2018	Arjuna Award	Outstanding Performance in Sports	Won	
2018	ITTF Star Awards	Breakthrough Star	Won	
2019	Indian Sports Honours	Women's Breakthrough of the Year	Nominated	
2020	Khel Ratna Award	Spectacular Performance in the Field of Sports	Won	

== See also ==
- Table tennis in India
