= Mouma Das =

Indian table tennis player

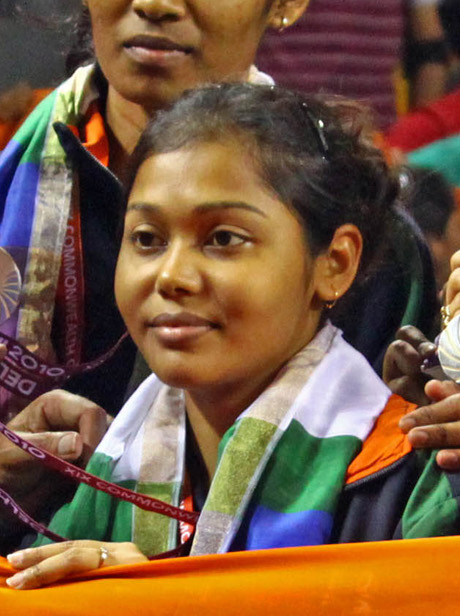
- Das in 2010

Personal information
- Nationality: Indian
- Born: 24 February 1984 (age 42) Narkeldanga, Kolkata, India
- Height: 1.49 m (4 ft 10 in)

Sport
- Sport: Table tennis
Medal record
Women's table tennis
Representing India
Commonwealth Games
Bronze medal – third place	2006 Melbourne	Women's team
Silver medal – second place	2010 Delhi	Women's team
Bronze medal – third place	2010 Delhi	Women's doubles
Gold medal – first place	2018 Gold Coast	Women's team
Silver medal – second place	2018 Gold Coast	Women's doubles
South Asian Games
Gold medal – first place	2004 Pakistan	Team Singles Doubles
Gold medal – first place	2006 Sri Lanka	Team Singles Doubles
Gold medal – first place	2016 Guwahati/Shillong	Women's singles
Gold medal – first place	2016 Guwahati/Shillong	Women's team
Silver medal – second place	2016 Guwahati/Shillong	Women's doubles
Silver medal – second place	2016 Guwahati/Shillong	Mixed doubles

Mouma Das (Bengali: মৌমা দাস; born 24 February 1984) is an Indian table tennis player. Born and brought up in Kolkata, West Bengal, she has represented India in international events since the early 2000s. Das has won multiple medals at the Commonwealth Games including a gold in the Women's Team Competition in 2018. She was awarded the Arjuna Award, India's second highest sporting honour in 2013 for her contributions to the sport.

Das participated in the 2004 Olympic Games where she competed in the singles table tennis competition; she made her second appearance at the event in the 2016 edition after a gap of 12 years. Das reached the quarterfinals of the women's doubles event at the 2017 World Table Tennis Championships partnering Manika Batra; the duo became the first Indian pair (and the first Indians in over 61 years) to do so. The pair also won the silver medal at the 2018 Commonwealth Games.She was awarded India's fourth highest civilian award the Padma Shri in 2021.

== Career ==
Das made her first World Table Tennis Championship appearance in the year 1997, at Manchester, and went on to reach the third round before bowing out. She did not participate the following year, because of an injury. In the subsequent world meets, Das either represented India as a singles player or as the team member: Kuala Lumpur (2000), Osaka (2001), Paris (2003), Doha (2004), Bremen (2006), Zagreb (2007), Guangzhou (2008), Yokohama (2009), Moscow (2010), Rotterdam (2011), Dortmund (2012), Paris (2013), Suzhou (2015), Kuala Lumpur (2016), Düsseldorf (2017), Halmstad (2018) without missing any championships. She registered the highest caps at the Championships, with 17 appearances. Das and Thailand's Komwon Nanthana have both represented their country 17 times each, the maximum by any Asian in both sections.

Das won her 1st International Gold medal in 2nd Children of Asia International Sports Games'2000 in Yakutsk.

Mouma Das played more than 400 international matches against 75 different countries.

At the December 2015 Commonwealth Championships, Das claimed a silver in the singles event along with team medal and became the maximum Commonwealth medal winning Indian Table Tennis player.

Das qualified for the 2016 Rio Olympics at the Asian Qualification Tournament held in Hong Kong in April 2015. However, her appearance at the 2016 Olympics short-lived, as she lost to higher seeded Daniela Dodean of Romania in the first round of the women's individual event.

For the Indian table tennis fraternity, ITTF World Tours have never been easy. But things were different in Olomouc, a city in Moravia, in the east of the Czech Republic. Mouma Das and Manika Batra, the women's doubles pair of India, lifted their game by several notches to reach the semi-finals for the first time at an ITTF World Tour (Major).

Indian star table tennis duo of Mouma Das and Manika Batra reached a world ranking of 12 in the latest ITTF rankings which is the best among 28 Commonwealth countries that play the sport on the big stages.

In 2017 ITTF Challenge Spanish Open Indian pair of Manika Batra and Mouma Das, seeded second, went down to the top-seed Korean duo of Jihee Jeon and Haeun Yang 11–9, 6–11, 11–9, 9–11, 9–11 in a thrilling women doubles final.it was a creditable performance by the Indians who forced the issue to the last two points to become the first Indian women's pair to finish with the silver medal in an ITTF Challenge series. Later that year, Das made her 50th Final in Annual Inter State & Senior National Table Tennis Championship in Ranchi; she also won gold medal in the team event, where she represented PSPB.

Das was a part of the Women's team that won the gold medal in the 2018 Commonwealth Games; the Indian team defeated Singapore in the final with a score of 3–1 to secure the first gold medal for the country in the event. Das won the women's doubles match partnering Madhurika Patkar to give India the lead in the tie. En route to the gold medal, the first by any nation other Singapore, India defeated the top seeded English team in semi-finals. Presently she is an employee of OIL (Oil India Ltd.).

== Records and statistics ==
Top Records

Sl.	For	Total Numbers	References
1	Most Participation in World Championship by an Indian & Asian TT Player	17	
2	Most Medals in Commonwealth TT (Games & Championship) by an Indian TT Player	19	
3	Most Gold hat-trick in Senior Nationals (Team, Single, Double & Mixed Doubles)	7	
4	Most Gold in South Asian Games by a TT Player	8	
5	Twice Gold hat-trick in South Asian Games by a TT Player	2004 & 2006	
6	Single's Gold hat-trick in South Asian Games by a TT Player	2004, 2006 & 2016	
7	Most Gold Medals in Senior Nationals (Team, Single, Double & Mixed Doubles)	32	
8	Most number of Finalist in senior National (Team, Single, Double & Mixed Doubles)	51	
9	Highest number of representation for Indian Team	1997 onwards	
10	Commonwealth (Games & Championship) Most number of finalist Indian women TT player	2010(1) 2013(1) 2015(3) & 2018(2) - 7 Times	
11	Twice medals in all 4 events of Commonwealth TT Championship	2013 & 2015	
12	World Table Tennis Championship Gold in Team Events (2nd Division)	2004 & 2016	
13	Total number of Gold in National & International Events	100+	
14	Total number of International Matches	400+	

=== Commonwealth Table Tennis ===
Following are finishes at the Commonwealth Table Tennis Championships and the Commonwealth Games.

Year	Competition	Medal	Event	References
2001	Championship	Bronze	Team	
2004	Championship	Bronze	Team	
2004	Championship	Bronze	Doubles	
2006	Games	Bronze	Team	
2007	Championship	Bronze	Team	
2009	Championship	Bronze	Team	
2009	Championship	Bronze	Single	
2010	Games	Silver	Team	
2010	Games	Bronze	Doubles	
2013	Championship	Silver	Mixed Doubles	
2013	Championship	Bronze	Doubles	
2013	Championship	Bronze	Team	
2013	Championship	Bronze	Single	
2015	Championship	Bronze	Doubles	
2015	Championship	Silver	Mixed Doubles	
2015	Championship	Silver	Team	
2015	Championship	Silver	Singles	
2018	Games	Gold	Team	
2018	Games	Silver	Doubles	

=== Gold Hat-Trick in Annual Senior Table Tennis Championship ===
Year	Event	Event	Event	References
2000	Team	Doubles	Mixed Doubles	
2001	Team	Singles	Doubles	
2002	Team	Doubles	Mixed Doubles	
2005	Team	Singles	Doubles	
2006	Team	Singles	Doubles	
2010	Team	Doubles	Mixed Doubles	
2014	Team	Singles	Doubles	

=== Indian Senior National Championships & National Games Individual Events ===
Year	Medal	Event	Ref
1996	Silver	Championship-Single	
1998	Silver	Championship-Single	
1999	Gold	Championship-Single	
1999	Gold	Games-Single	
2001	Gold	Championship-Single	
2002	Silver	Championship-Single	
2002	Gold	Games-Single	
2004	Silver	Championship-Single	
2005	Gold	Championship-Single	
2006	Gold	Championship-Single	
2008	Silver	Championship-Single	
2014	Gold	Championship-Single	

=== World Table Tennis Championship ===
Year	Location	References
1997	Manchester-ENGLAND	
2000	Kuala Lumpur-MALAYSIA	
2001	Osaka-JAPAN	
2003	Paris-FRANCE	
2004	Doha-QATAR	
2006	Bremen-GERMANY	
2007	Zagreb-CROATIA	
2008	Guangzhou-CHINA	
2009	Yokohama-JAPAN	
2010	Moscow-RUSSIA	
2011	Rotterdam-NETHERLANDS	
2012	Dortmund-GERMANY	
2013	Paris-FRANCE	
2015	Suzhou-CHINA	
2016	Kuala Lumpur-MALAYSIA	
2017	Düsseldorf-GERMANY	
2018	Halmstad-SWEDEN	

== See also ==
- Sharath Kamal
- Poulomi Ghatak
- Shamini Kumaresan
