= Charlotte Carey =

Welsh table tennis player

Personal information
- Nationality: British
- Born: 11 June 1996 (age 30) Ebbw Vale, Wales
- Height: 174 cm (5 ft 9 in) (2022)
- Weight: 67 kg (148 lb) (2022)

Sport
- Sport: Table tennis
Medal record
Women's table tennis
Representing Wales
Commonwealth Games
Bronze medal – third place	2022 Birmingham	Women's doubles

Charlotte Carey (born 11 June 1996) is a Welsh table tennis player. Her highest career ITTF ranking was 98 in 2018.

Carey comes from Ebbw Vale and attended Glyncoed Comprehensive School. began playing in 2006 and trained at the Sport Wales National Centre in Cardiff. At the 2010 Commonwealth Games in Delhi, aged 14, Carey was the youngest member of the team selected to compete for Wales. In 2013, her career progressed with two bronze medals at the European Youth Championships and in the same year she won two gold medals on the Maltese TTF Global Junior Circuit. At the 2014 Commonwealth Games in Glasgow, she was defeated in the second round of the Women's Singles, and in the third round of the Women's Doubles, with Naomi Owen as her partner. In the team competition at the same games, she was part of the Welsh team that was defeated in the quarter-finals.

At the 2022 Commonwealth Games in Birmingham, Carey and her partner Anna Hursey won the bronze medal in the Women's doubles competition.
