= Kelly Sibley =

British table tennis player

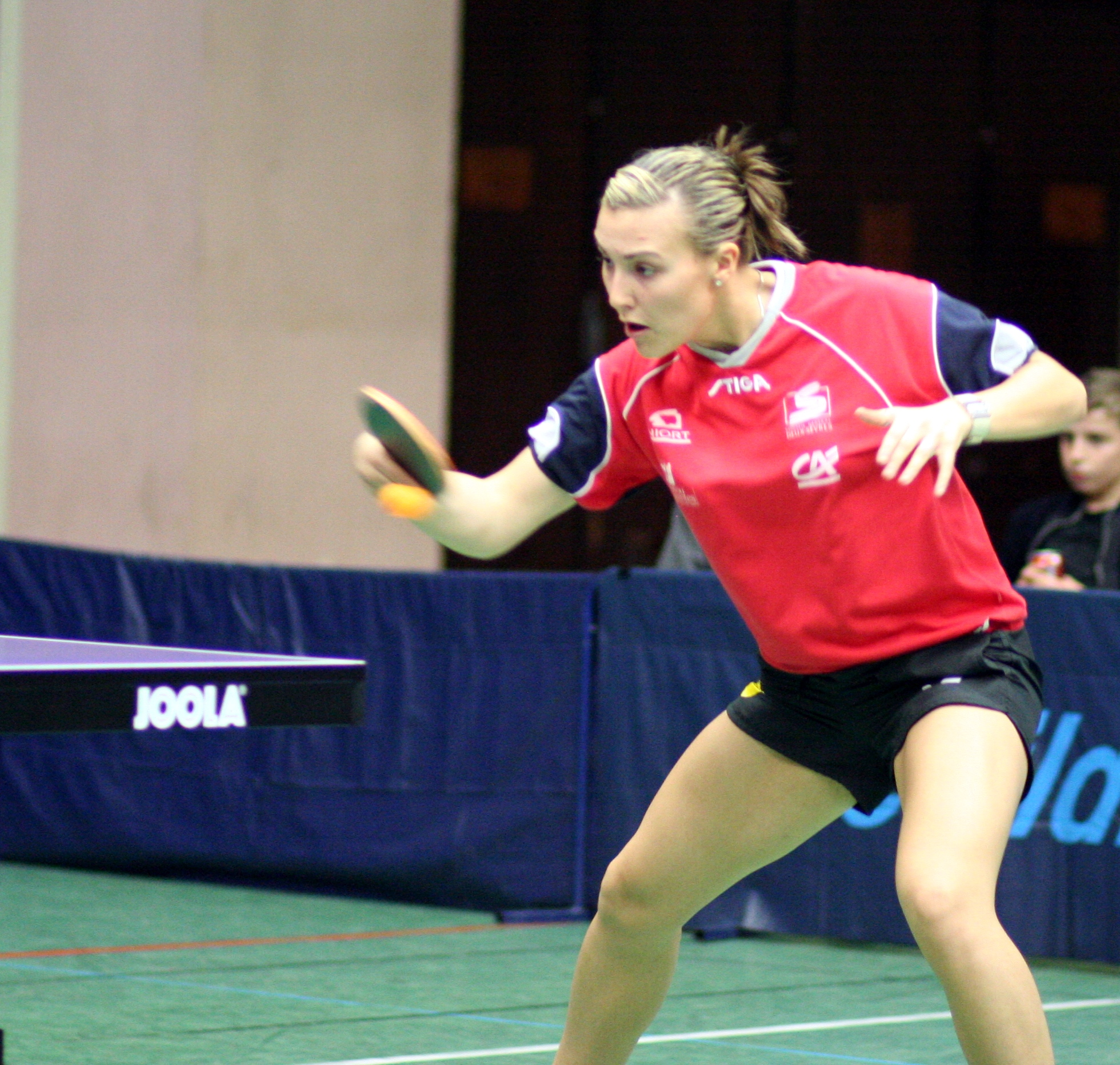
- Kelly Sibley at the Pro B French Championships in 2006

Personal information
- Full name: Kelly Michelle Sibley
- Nationality: England
- Born: 21 May 1988 (age 38) Leamington Spa, England
- Height: 1.72 m (5 ft 8 in)
- Weight: 68 kg (150 lb)

Sport
- Sport: Table tennis
- Playing style: Right Hand Attacking Shakehand
Medal record
Women's table tennis
Representing England
Commonwealth Games
Bronze medal – third place	2014 Glasgow	Mixed Doubles
Bronze medal – third place	2018 Gold Coast	Team

Kelly Sibley (born 21 May 1988) is a former professional table tennis player and current coach from England. Sibley won the singles, girls doubles and mixed doubles at the UK Junior Championships and has represented England at senior level at the Commonwealth Games, European Championships and World Championships.

== Biography ==
Sibley began playing table tennis aged 8 years old at Lillington Free Church table tennis club in Lillington, Leamington Spa, inspired by her mother Lynn Bolitho, a former county-level table tennis player.

In 2000, she represented England at the English Schools Championships.

At the age of 13, she was invited to live and train at the National Training centre in Nottingham where she was coached by Alan Cooke before relocating to the English Institute of Sport in Sheffield.

Sibley represented England at the Commonwealth Games twice without medalling; once in Melbourne, Australia (2006) and again in Delhi, India (2010) where she finished in fourth place in the team women's event. At Glasgow 2014, she won her first Commonwealth Games medal when she took bronze in the mixed doubles alongside Danny Reed.

She also gained a Ladies Doubles Bronze Medal at the 2009 Commonwealth Championships, a team silver at the 2013 Commonwealth Championships and a Division Two Gold Medal at the 2008 World Team Championships in China.

Sibley won 10 consecutive international matches at the 2011 European Championships in Poland and promoted the England Women's team to the top tier.

Funding cuts threatened her chance to compete at the London 2012 Olympics, but it was announced on 30 May 2012 that Sibley would be competing in the games, where she competed in the team event, losing to North Korea in the opening round.

Sibley has won national singles titles at Cadet, Junior, U21 and Senior level, girls' doubles titles at U12, Cadet and Junior levels, women's doubles at Senior level and mixed doubles at Junior and Senior Levels. She won the women's singles national championship in March 2015 and was runner up the next two years.

In June 2015 she was part of the Great Britain table tennis squad which competed at the inaugural European Games in Baku. At the 2018 Commonwealth Games Sibley won a bronze medal in the team event, beating Australia in the play-off game. Shortly after the games she announced her retirement from the sport in order to focus on her job as head coach at the University of Nottingham

As a player, she was sponsored by local firms Wright Hassell, Building and Plumbing Supplies and, in 2011, sports betting site OLBG.com.

=== Personal life ===
Sibley married her wife Laura in April 2017. They met just after the 2012 Summer Olympics whilst Laura was working at a table tennis bar. She proposed to Sibley whilst in The Shard viewing St Paul's Cathedral.

== See also ==
- List of England players at the World Team Table Tennis Championships
