= 2018 World Weightlifting Championships – Women's 64 kg =

2018 women weightlifting championship

The women's 64 kilograms competition at the 2018 World Weightlifting Championships was held on 4–5 November 2018.

In February 2019 Rattanawan Wamalun the original bronze medalist was stripped of her medal.

== Schedule ==
Date	Time	Event
4 November 2018	22:00	Group D
5 November 2018	08:00	Group C
5 November 2018	14:25	Group B
5 November 2018	19:55	Group A

== Medalists ==
Event	Gold		Silver		Bronze	
Snatch	Deng Wei (CHN)	112 kg	Loredana Toma (ROU)	110 kg	Karina Goricheva (KAZ)	107 kg
Clean & Jerk	Deng Wei (CHN)	140 kg	Rim Un-sim (PRK)	134 kg	Mercedes Pérez (COL)	127 kg
Total	Deng Wei (CHN)	252 kg	Rim Un-sim (PRK)	239 kg	Loredana Toma (ROU)	234 kg

== Records ==
Prior to this competition, the existing world records were as follows.

World Record	Snatch	World Standard	110 kg	—	1 November 2018
World Record	Clean & Jerk	World Standard	138 kg	—	1 November 2018
World Record	Total	World Standard	245 kg	—	1 November 2018

== Results ==
Rank	Athlete	Group	Snatch (kg)				Clean & Jerk (kg)				Total
Rank	Athlete	Group	1	2	3	Rank	1	2	3	Rank	Total
1st place, gold medalist(s)	Deng Wei (CHN)	A	~~110~~	110	112	1st place, gold medalist(s)	135	138	140	1st place, gold medalist(s)	252
2nd place, silver medalist(s)	Rim Un-sim (PRK)	A	105	~~109~~	~~109~~	4	130	134	~~137~~	2nd place, silver medalist(s)	239
3rd place, bronze medalist(s)	Loredana Toma (ROU)	A	106	110	~~112~~	2nd place, silver medalist(s)	124	~~128~~	~~129~~	7	234
4	Mercedes Pérez (COL)	A	100	105	~~108~~	5	127	~~131~~	~~131~~	3rd place, bronze medalist(s)	232
5	Assem Sadykova (KAZ)	B	96	101	~~104~~	6	120	125	~~130~~	4	226
6	Karina Goricheva (KAZ)	B	~~100~~	100	107	3rd place, bronze medalist(s)	113	117	~~121~~	17	224
7	Tima Turieva (RUS)	A	96	~~101~~	101	7	117	122	~~126~~	12	223
8	Rosivé Silgado (COL)	A	95	~~98~~	98	10	125	~~129~~	~~130~~	6	223
9	Angie Palacios (ECU)	C	91	95	100	8	115	120	122	10	222
10	Maude Charron (CAN)	B	~~97~~	~~97~~	97	11	120	~~123~~	123	9	220
11	Giorgia Bordignon (ITA)	A	~~95~~	95	100	9	120	~~124~~	~~124~~	15	220
12	Yusleidy Figueroa (VEN)	B	93	~~95~~	~~95~~	20	121	125	~~130~~	5	218
13	Mattie Sasser (USA)	A	94	97	~~100~~	12	~~120~~	121	~~125~~	13	218
14	Tatiana Aleeva (RUS)	B	90	94	95	14	114	119	122	11	217
15	Sarah Davies (GBR)	B	92	94	~~95~~	16	118	121	123	8	217
16	Zoe Smith (GBR)	B	~~92~~	92	95	13	117	~~120~~	120	14	215
17	Anni Vuohijoki (FIN)	B	~~92~~	~~94~~	95	15	~~114~~	115	118	16	213
18	Park Min-kyung (KOR)	C	90	93	~~96~~	17	110	~~115~~	115	21	208
19	Rakhi Halder (IND)	B	88	92	~~94~~	22	116	~~120~~	~~120~~	19	208
20	Hunter Elam (USA)	B	90	~~93~~	~~94~~	29	114	~~116~~	117	18	207
21	Kumushkhon Fayzullaeva (UZB)	B	90	~~93~~	~~94~~	30	112	~~115~~	116	20	206
22	Kiana Elliott (AUS)	B	~~92~~	92	~~95~~	23	110	113	~~116~~	23	205
23	Namika Matsumoto (JPN)	B	~~93~~	93	~~95~~	21	~~109~~	109	111	26	204
24	Mahassen Fattouh (LBN)	C	86	89	~~92~~	32	109	114	~~116~~	22	203
25	Nuray Levent (TUR)	C	~~89~~	90	~~94~~	27	108	112	~~115~~	24	202
26	Kim Ye-ra (KOR)	D	84	86	89	31	105	108	111	25	200
27	Lisa Marie Schweizer (GER)	C	88	~~91~~	91	24	105	108	~~110~~	33	199
28	Beáta Jung (HUN)	C	~~90~~	90	93	19	101	105	~~108~~	36	198
29	Philippa Malone (AUS)	C	90	~~93~~	~~93~~	25	108	~~112~~	~~112~~	31	198
30	Saara Leskinen (FIN)	C	87	~~90~~	90	28	~~105~~	108	~~111~~	32	198
31	Siuzanna Valodzka (BLR)	C	85	90	~~92~~	26	103	~~108~~	108	34	198
32	Ganzorigiin Anuujin (MGL)	C	~~89~~	89	~~92~~	33	109	~~113~~	~~113~~	28	198
33	Irene Martínez (ESP)	C	90	93	~~95~~	18	~~104~~	~~104~~	104	37	197
34	Olauwatoyin Adesanmi (NGR)	D	~~85~~	85	~~90~~	35	~~110~~	110	~~115~~	27	195
35	Ana de Gregorio (ESP)	D	~~84~~	84	87	34	98	103	106	35	193
36	Rachel Siemens (CAN)	D	82	84	~~86~~	36	105	~~108~~	108	30	192
37	Mona Pretorius (RSA)	C	~~83~~	83	~~88~~	37	102	—	—	38	185
38	Yasmin Zammit Stevens (MLT)	D	80	~~83~~	~~83~~	39	96	99	~~101~~	40	179
39	Mabia Akhter (BAN)	D	75	~~79~~	79	41	~~100~~	100	~~103~~	39	179
40	Eliška Pudivítrová (CZE)	D	~~75~~	75	79	40	96	~~99~~	99	41	178
41	Megan Signal (NZL)	D	75	79	82	38	95	~~100~~	~~100~~	45	177
42	Robyn February (RSA)	D	74	78	~~82~~	42	~~98~~	~~99~~	99	42	177
43	Ivana Horná (SVK)	D	75	78	~~80~~	43	~~97~~	~~97~~	98	43	176
44	Eliška Fernezová (SVK)	D	~~74~~	74	~~77~~	44	95	~~100~~	~~100~~	44	169
—	Akane Yoshida (JPN)	C	~~87~~	~~87~~	~~87~~	—	106	~~109~~	109	29	—
—	Kim Hyo-sim (PRK)	A	~~111~~	~~111~~	~~111~~	—	—	—	—	—	—
DQ	Lin Tzu-chi (TPE)	A	~~105~~	105	~~108~~	—	~~130~~	130	~~133~~	—	—
DQ	Rattanawan Wamalun (THA)	A	99	102	~~105~~	—	131	135	137	—	—

- All competitive results obtained by Lin Tzu-chi from 24 June 2016 are disqualified after WADA won an appeal at the Court of Arbitration for Sport.

== New records ==
Snatch	112 kg	Deng Wei (CHN)	WR
Clean & Jerk	140 kg	Deng Wei (CHN)	WR
Total	247 kg	Deng Wei (CHN)	WR
Total	250 kg	Deng Wei (CHN)	WR
Total	252 kg	Deng Wei (CHN)	WR
