= 2014 World Weightlifting Championships – Women's 63 kg =

The women's 63 kilograms event at the 2014 World Weightlifting Championships was held on 12 and 13 November 2014 in Baluan Sholak Sports Palace, Almaty, Kazakhstan.

== Schedule ==
Date	Time	Event
12 November 2014	10:00	Group C
12 November 2014	12:00	Group B
13 November 2014	16:00	Group A

== Medalists ==
Event	Gold		Silver		Bronze	
Snatch	Karina Goricheva (KAZ)	113 kg	Tima Turieva (RUS)	112 kg	Lin Tzu-chi (TPE)	110 kg
Clean & Jerk	Deng Wei (CHN)	142 kg	Choe Hyo-sim (PRK)	140 kg	Tima Turieva (RUS)	140 kg
Total	Deng Wei (CHN)	252 kg	Tima Turieva (RUS)	252 kg	Choe Hyo-sim (PRK)	248 kg

== Records ==
Prior to this competition, the existing world records were as follows.

World Record	Snatch	Svetlana Tsarukaeva (RUS)	117 kg	Paris, France	8 November 2011
World Record	Clean & Jerk	Lin Tzu-chi (TPE)	145 kg	Incheon, South Korea	23 September 2014
World Record	Total	Lin Tzu-chi (TPE)	261 kg	Incheon, South Korea	23 September 2014

== Results ==
Rank	Athlete	Group	Body weight	Snatch (kg)				Clean & Jerk (kg)				Total
Rank	Athlete	Group	Body weight	1	2	3	Rank	1	2	3	Rank	Total
1st place, gold medalist(s)	Deng Wei (CHN)	A	62.21	~~110~~	~~110~~	110	4	130	136	142	1st place, gold medalist(s)	252
2nd place, silver medalist(s)	Tima Turieva (RUS)	A	62.37	108	112	~~114~~	2nd place, silver medalist(s)	136	140	~~142~~	3rd place, bronze medalist(s)	252
3rd place, bronze medalist(s)	Choe Hyo-sim (PRK)	A	62.10	~~108~~	108	~~111~~	8	133	138	140	2nd place, silver medalist(s)	248
4	Lin Tzu-chi (TPE)	A	61.26	~~110~~	110	~~113~~	3rd place, bronze medalist(s)	~~135~~	136	~~140~~	5	246
5	Pimsiri Sirikaew (THA)	A	61.96	102	105	108	7	133	~~137~~	138	4	246
6	Karina Goricheva (KAZ)	A	62.62	103	108	113	1st place, gold medalist(s)	~~128~~	128	133	7	246
7	Jo Pok-hyang (PRK)	A	62.65	105	108	~~110~~	10	~~135~~	135	~~139~~	6	243
8	Nastassia Novikava (BLR)	A	62.73	105	~~109~~	109	5	133	~~138~~	~~138~~	8	242
9	Yuliya Kalina (UKR)	A	61.93	104	~~108~~	108	6	125	131	~~133~~	9	239
10	Nadezda Likhacheva (RUS)	B	62.55	101	105	108	9	126	~~131~~	131	10	239
11	Mercedes Pérez (COL)	A	62.45	100	~~104~~	104	12	127	~~132~~	~~132~~	11	231
12	Sara Ahmed (EGY)	B	62.54	100	~~104~~	104	13	120	125	~~129~~	12	229
13	Alexandra Escobar (ECU)	A	60.91	100	104	105	11	122	~~127~~	~~127~~	14	227
14	Darya Tseveleva (BLR)	B	61.85	88	92	96	16	115	120	123	13	219
15	Giorgia Bordignon (ITA)	B	62.29	92	96	98	14	~~113~~	113	~~116~~	19	211
16	Geralee Vega (USA)	B	61.40	95	~~100~~	~~100~~	18	115	~~121~~	~~124~~	15	210
17	Nadiia Chibisova (UKR)	B	59.96	90	93	95	17	114	~~120~~	~~121~~	16	209
18	Izabella Yaylyan (ARM)	B	61.74	90	95	97	15	110	~~114~~	~~114~~	22	207
19	Sabine Kusterer (GER)	B	61.85	88	91	92	19	107	109	111	21	203
20	Punam Yadav (IND)	B	62.73	83	86	89	23	110	~~113~~	113	20	202
21	Kim Ye-ra (KOR)	C	62.54	83	87	~~91~~	26	108	114	~~118~~	17	201
22	Eda Çakal (TUR)	B	62.82	80	84	86	31	110	114	~~117~~	18	200
23	Eva Gurrola (MEX)	B	62.76	~~88~~	~~88~~	88	24	110	~~114~~	~~114~~	24	198
24	Katarzyna Ostapska (POL)	B	62.69	85	~~87~~	87	27	110	~~113~~	~~113~~	23	197
25	Gulnaz Nauryzova (KAZ)	C	62.70	83	87	91	20	105	~~110~~	~~110~~	30	196
26	Nikoletta Nagy (HUN)	B	62.72	~~85~~	~~85~~	86	30	105	~~107~~	107	25	193
27	Irene Martínez (ESP)	C	62.05	87	90	~~95~~	21	102	~~105~~	~~105~~	33	192
28	Mahassen Fattouh (LIB)	C	61.73	82	~~85~~	85	32	102	106	~~110~~	26	191
29	Sarah Davies (GBR)	C	62.58	83	86	~~90~~	29	105	~~108~~	~~109~~	28	191
30	Emily Godley (GBR)	C	62.59	~~85~~	~~85~~	85	33	105	~~109~~	~~109~~	29	190
31	Solenny Villasmil (VEN)	C	62.03	82	86	~~90~~	28	103	~~106~~	~~106~~	32	189
32	Kristine Petrosyan (ARM)	C	62.21	82	85	87	25	98	102	~~104~~	34	189
33	Anna Everi (FIN)	C	62.70	80	84	~~87~~	34	104	~~108~~	~~108~~	31	188
34	Elnura Abbasova (AZE)	C	60.76	75	~~80~~	80	35	100	105	~~109~~	27	185
35	Vandna Gupta (IND)	C	61.61	73	76	~~78~~	36	92	95	~~98~~	35	171
36	Kinga Szilágyi (HUN)	C	61.79	~~70~~	~~70~~	70	38	85	~~90~~	90	37	160
37	Jacquie White (AUS)	C	62.39	69	71	73	37	80	—	—	38	153
—	Mehtap Kurnaz (TUR)	B	62.10	87	89	90	22	~~108~~	~~108~~	~~108~~	—	—
—	Mihaela Kruljac (CRO)	C	62.37	~~70~~	~~70~~	~~70~~	—	83	88	91	36	—
DQ	Romela Begaj (ALB)	A	62.23	110	~~113~~	113	—	~~127~~	127	132	—	—
