= Weightlifting at the 2014 Asian Games – Women's 63 kg =

Women's 63 kg at the 2014 Asian Games
- Venue: Moonlight Festival Garden Venue
- Date: 23 September 2014
- Competitors: 9 from 9 nations

Medalists
gold medal	Lin Tzu-chi	Chinese Taipei
silver medal	Deng Wei	China
bronze medal	Jo Pok-hyang	North Korea

The women's 63 kilograms event at the 2014 Asian Games took place on 23 September 2014 at Moonlight Festival Garden Weightlifting Venue in Incheon, South Korea.

== Schedule ==
All times are Korea Standard Time (UTC+09:00)

Date	Time	Event
Tuesday, 23 September 2014	16:00	Group A

== Records ==
Prior to this competition, the existing world, Asian and Games records were as follows.

World Record	Snatch	Svetlana Tsarukaeva (RUS)	117 kg	Paris, France	8 November 2011
World Record	Clean & Jerk	Maiya Maneza (KAZ)	143 kg	Antalya, Turkey	20 September 2010
World Record	Total	Liu Haixia (CHN)	257 kg	Chiang Mai, Thailand	23 September 2007
Asian Record	Snatch	Pawina Thongsuk (THA)	116 kg	Doha, Qatar	12 November 2005
Asian Record	Clean & Jerk	Maiya Maneza (KAZ)	143 kg	Antalya, Turkey	20 September 2010
Asian Record	Total	Liu Haixia (CHN)	257 kg	Chiang Mai, Thailand	23 September 2007
Games Record	Snatch	Ouyang Xiaofang (CHN)	115 kg	Doha, Qatar	4 December 2006
Games Record	Clean & Jerk	Pawina Thongsuk (THA)	142 kg	Doha, Qatar	4 December 2006
Games Record	Total	Pawina Thongsuk (THA)	252 kg	Doha, Qatar	4 December 2006

== Results ==
Legend

- NM — No mark

Rank	Athlete	Group	Body weight	Snatch (kg)				Clean & Jerk (kg)				Total
Rank	Athlete	Group	Body weight	1	2	3	Result	1	2	3	Result	Total
1st place, gold medalist(s)	Lin Tzu-chi (TPE)	A	62.31	110	~~115~~	116	116	140	143	145	145	261
2nd place, silver medalist(s)	Deng Wei (CHN)	A	62.23	110	115	~~116~~	115	141	~~144~~	144	144	259
3rd place, bronze medalist(s)	Jo Pok-hyang (PRK)	A	62.09	~~107~~	107	~~112~~	107	137	140	~~144~~	140	247
4	Karina Goricheva (KAZ)	A	62.70	106	111	~~115~~	111	131	136	~~139~~	136	247
5	Pimsiri Sirikaew (THA)	A	61.36	102	106	108	108	134	~~139~~	~~139~~	134	242
6	Sinta Darmariani (INA)	A	62.88	88	92	~~94~~	92	115	~~119~~	~~123~~	115	207
7	Punam Yadav (IND)	A	62.52	83	87	90	90	110	~~115~~	~~115~~	110	200
8	Namika Matsumoto (JPN)	A	62.52	87	90	~~92~~	90	106	110	~~112~~	110	200
—	Kim Soo-kyung (KOR)	A	62.94	90	—	—	90	—	—	—	—	NM

== New records ==
The following records were established during the competition.

Snatch	116	Lin Tzu-chi (TPE)	GR
Clean & Jerk	143	Lin Tzu-chi (TPE)	GR
Clean & Jerk	144	Deng Wei (CHN)	WR
Clean & Jerk	145	Lin Tzu-chi (TPE)	WR
Total	256	Lin Tzu-chi (TPE)	GR
Total	259	Lin Tzu-chi (TPE)	WR
Total	261	Lin Tzu-chi (TPE)	WR
