= 2019 World Weightlifting Championships – Women's 64 kg =

The women's 64 kg competition at the 2019 World Weightlifting Championships was held on 21 and 22 September 2019. Deng Wei from China dominated the championship. She claimed gold in the snatch as well as the clean & jerk events. She bettered her own world records in both events.

== Schedule ==
Date	Time	Event
21 September 2019	22:30	Group D
22 September 2019	08:00	Group C
22 September 2019	12:00	Group B
22 September 2019	20:25	Group A

== Medalists ==
Event	Gold		Silver		Bronze	
Snatch	Deng Wei (CHN)	116 kg	Rim Un-sim (PRK)	114 kg	Loredana Toma (ROU)	112 kg
Clean & Jerk	Deng Wei (CHN)	145 kg	Rim Un-sim (PRK)	137 kg	Mercedes Pérez (COL)	132 kg
Total	Deng Wei (CHN)	261 kg	Rim Un-sim (PRK)	251 kg	Loredana Toma (ROU)	240 kg

== Records ==
Prior to this competition, the existing world records were as follows.

World Record	Snatch	Deng Wei (CHN)	115 kg	Ningbo, China	24 April 2019
World Record	Clean & Jerk	Deng Wei (CHN)	142 kg	Ningbo, China	24 April 2019
World Record	Total	Deng Wei (CHN)	257 kg	Ningbo, China	24 April 2019

== Results ==
Rank	Athlete	Group	Snatch (kg)				Clean & Jerk (kg)				Total
Rank	Athlete	Group	1	2	3	Rank	1	2	3	Rank	Total
1st place, gold medalist(s)	Deng Wei (CHN)	A	108	113	116	1st place, gold medalist(s)	138	143	145	1st place, gold medalist(s)	261
2nd place, silver medalist(s)	Rim Un-sim (PRK)	A	108	112	114	2nd place, silver medalist(s)	130	134	137	2nd place, silver medalist(s)	251
3rd place, bronze medalist(s)	Loredana Toma (ROU)	A	107	112	~~116~~	3rd place, bronze medalist(s)	~~127~~	~~127~~	128	4	240
4	Mercedes Pérez (COL)	A	102	~~106~~	106	5	128	132	~~135~~	3rd place, bronze medalist(s)	238
5	Irina Lepșa (ROU)	A	103	106	109	4	126	~~132~~	~~132~~	6	235
6	Maude Charron (CAN)	A	100	103	~~106~~	6	123	127	~~130~~	5	230
7	Natalia Llamosa (COL)	A	98	102	~~104~~	7	120	~~125~~	~~125~~	15	222
8	Sarah Davies (GBR)	A	95	98	~~100~~	11	124	~~129~~	~~130~~	9	222
9	Giorgia Bordignon (ITA)	B	95	99	101	8	~~120~~	120	~~122~~	14	221
10	Kumushkhon Fayzullaeva (UZB)	B	93	~~96~~	97	12	118	~~123~~	124	7	221
11	Elreen Ando (PHI)	B	95	98	~~100~~	10	115	118	~~121~~	17	216
12	Kim Ye-ra (KOR)	C	93	96	~~98~~	13	115	119	~~121~~	16	215
13	Chen Wen-huei (TPE)	B	92	~~96~~	~~98~~	21	118	123	~~128~~	10	215
14	Rakhi Halder (IND)	B	~~90~~	~~90~~	90	25	120	~~124~~	124	8	214
15	Nuray Levent (TUR)	B	90	~~93~~	94	16	112	117	~~120~~	18	211
16	Sabine Kusterer (GER)	D	91	95	~~97~~	15	111	115	~~117~~	21	210
17	Mahassen Fattouh (LBN)	C	88	~~91~~	~~92~~	27	112	117	121	12	209
18	Anni Vuohijoki (FIN)	B	91	~~94~~	~~94~~	24	114	117	~~119~~	19	208
19	Megan Signal (NZL)	C	88	~~91~~	92	20	~~113~~	113	115	22	207
20	Sarah Cochrane (AUS)	D	88	93	~~96~~	17	108	~~113~~	113	25	206
21	Lisa Marie Schweizer (GER)	C	91	94	96	14	107	110	~~112~~	29	206
22	Namika Matsumoto (JPN)	C	93	~~96~~	~~96~~	19	112	~~114~~	~~114~~	27	205
23	Rachel Siemens (CAN)	D	87	89	91	22	109	112	~~115~~	26	203
24	Akane Yoshida (JPN)	C	86	~~89~~	89	26	114	~~117~~	~~117~~	24	203
25	Kiana Elliott (AUS)	C	93	~~95~~	~~96~~	18	109	~~111~~	~~113~~	31	202
26	Phạm Thị Hồng Thanh (VIE)	C	~~88~~	88	~~91~~	28	108	110	112	28	200
27	Daniela Gherman (SWE)	C	88	~~91~~	91	23	103	108	~~112~~	33	199
28	Polina Gurýewa (TKM)	B	88	~~91~~	~~91~~	29	110	—	—	30	198
29	Marianne Saarhelo (FIN)	C	~~87~~	~~87~~	87	30	109	~~113~~	~~113~~	32	196
30	Mona Pretorius (RSA)	D	80	~~83~~	83	34	102	105	107	34	190
31	Ganzorigiin Anuujin (MGL)	C	~~87~~	~~87~~	87	31	103	~~105~~	—	38	190
32	Amanda Poulsen (DEN)	D	81	85	~~87~~	33	101	104	~~107~~	36	189
33	Vania Ravololoniaina (MAD)	D	85	~~87~~	~~87~~	32	100	~~103~~	~~103~~	39	185
34	Mabia Akhter (BAN)	D	70	75	80	35	95	100	103	37	183
35	Mercedes Portela (URU)	D	68	72	~~75~~	36	86	90	~~95~~	40	162
36	Ivana Rumenović (CRO)	D	~~66~~	~~66~~	66	37	~~85~~	~~85~~	85	41	151
—	Mattie Sasser (USA)	A	96	100	~~103~~	9	~~125~~	~~126~~	~~127~~	—	—
—	Marina Rodríguez (CUB)	B	~~94~~	~~94~~	~~94~~	—	117	120	122	11	—
—	Han So-jin (KOR)	C	~~100~~	~~100~~	~~101~~	—	112	115	120	13	—
—	Yuliya Shymechko (UKR)	B	~~87~~	~~88~~	~~88~~	—	113	~~116~~	116	20	—
—	Angie Palacios (ECU)	B	~~101~~	~~101~~	~~101~~	—	115	—	—	23	—
—	Marit Årdalsbakke (NOR)	D	~~87~~	~~87~~	~~87~~	—	100	104	~~107~~	35	—

== New records ==
Snatch	116 kg	Deng Wei (CHN)	WR
Clean & Jerk	143 kg	Deng Wei (CHN)	WR
Clean & Jerk	145 kg	Deng Wei (CHN)	WR
Total	259 kg	Deng Wei (CHN)	WR
Total	261 kg	Deng Wei (CHN)	WR
