= 2023 World Weightlifting Championships – Women's 64 kg =

The women's 64 kilograms competition at the 2023 World Weightlifting Championships was held on 9 and 10 September 2023.

== Schedule ==
Date	Time	Event
9 September 2023	09:00	Group D
9 September 2023	14:00	Group C
10 September 2023	16:30	Group B
10 September 2023	19:00	Group A

== Medalists ==
Event	Gold		Silver		Bronze	
Snatch	Natalia Llamosa (COL)	101 kg	Julieth Rodríguez (COL)	101 kg	Ruth Ayodele (NGR)	100 kg
Clean & Jerk	Park Min-kyung (KOR)	123 kg	Ruth Ayodele (NGR)	122 kg	Natalia Llamosa (COL)	122 kg
Total	Natalia Llamosa (COL)	223 kg	Ruth Ayodele (NGR)	222 kg	Park Min-kyung (KOR)	220 kg

== Records ==
Prior to this competition, the existing world records were as follows.

World Record	Snatch	Deng Wei (CHN)	117 kg	Tianjin, China	11 December 2019
World Record	Clean & Jerk	Deng Wei (CHN)	145 kg	Pattaya, Thailand	22 September 2019
World Record	Total	Deng Wei (CHN)	261 kg	Pattaya, Thailand	22 September 2019

== Results ==
Rank	Athlete	Group	Snatch (kg)				Clean & Jerk (kg)				Total
Rank	Athlete	Group	1	2	3	Rank	1	2	3	Rank	Total
1st place, gold medalist(s)	Natalia Llamosa (COL)	A	99	101	~~103~~	1st place, gold medalist(s)	118	121	122	3rd place, bronze medalist(s)	223
2nd place, silver medalist(s)	Ruth Ayodele (NGR)	B	~~95~~	95	100	3rd place, bronze medalist(s)	~~117~~	117	122	2nd place, silver medalist(s)	222
3rd place, bronze medalist(s)	Park Min-kyung (KOR)	B	91	95	97	6	117	121	123	1st place, gold medalist(s)	220
4	Julieth Rodríguez (COL)	A	99	101	~~103~~	2nd place, silver medalist(s)	~~119~~	119	~~122~~	4	220
5	Tsabitha Alfiah Ramadani (INA)	A	~~95~~	95	100	4	~~112~~	112	117	5	217
6	Hanna Davydova (UKR)	A	~~94~~	94	98	5	~~112~~	112	~~116~~	13	210
7	Han Ji-an (KOR)	B	~~95~~	95	~~98~~	8	~~110~~	110	~~115~~	19	205
8	Vicky Graillot (FRA)	A	88	90	~~92~~	13	112	116	~~122~~	6	206
9	Mariia Hanhur (UKR)	A	92	94	~~96~~	9	~~111~~	111	~~113~~	15	205
10	Shakhlokhon Abdullaeva (UZB)	A	~~91~~	91	~~94~~	12	108	112	~~115~~	12	203
11	Wiktoria Wołk (POL)	B	87	90	92	11	107	110	~~114~~	18	202
12	Hung Wan-ting (TPE)	C	85	~~88~~	88	16	110	113	~~116~~	7	201
13	Reihaneh Karimi (IRI)	B	84	89	~~92~~	14	~~107~~	108	112	9	201
14	Li Wei-chia (TPE)	B	~~86~~	86	~~89~~	21	108	111	~~113~~	14	197
15	Olivia Selemaia (NZL)	C	84	88	~~90~~	15	104	108	~~111~~	21	196
16	Darcy Kay (AUS)	C	83	~~86~~	86	20	105	~~110~~	110	17	196
17	Myrthe Timmermans (NED)	B	~~88~~	88	~~90~~	17	~~108~~	~~108~~	108	22	196
18	Monica Knowlton (CAN)	C	~~79~~	79	82	27	~~108~~	108	113	8	195
19	Emma McIntyre (NZL)	C	83	~~87~~	87	18	103	~~107~~	107	23	194
20	Fatemeh Keshavarz (IRI)	B	82	87	~~89~~	19	107	~~112~~	~~115~~	24	194
21	Garoa Martínez (ESP)	B	~~84~~	84	~~89~~	23	106	~~110~~	110	20	194
22	Alexa Mina (LBN)	C	~~83~~	83	~~87~~	24	104	107	110	16	193
23	Jessica Gordon Brown (GBR)	C	~~80~~	82	85	22	102	105	—	25	190
24	Tenishia Thornton (MLT)	C	79	81	83	25	100	103	~~105~~	26	186
25	Laura Wheatcroft (GBR)	C	82	~~85~~	~~86~~	26	102	~~104~~	~~105~~	28	184
26	Marta Monteiro (POR)	D	73	~~79~~	79	29	102	~~106~~	~~106~~	27	181
27	Yusleidy Figueroa (VEN)	C	78	~~81~~	~~81~~	30	~~102~~	102	~~105~~	29	180
28	Saara Retulainen (FIN)	D	75	78	80	28	85	89	92	32	172
29	Catarina Augusto (POR)	D	~~70~~	70	75	34	92	97	~~102~~	30	172
30	Amalía Ósk Sigurðardóttir (ISL)	D	73	77	~~80~~	31	93	~~98~~	~~100~~	31	170
31	Katla Björk Ketilsdóttir (ISL)	D	73	76	~~79~~	33	86	89	~~91~~	34	165
32	Ivana Gorišek (CRO)	D	~~74~~	74	77	32	~~87~~	87	~~90~~	35	164
33	Sharada Chaudhary (NEP)	D	65	~~71~~	~~71~~	37	85	90	~~94~~	33	155
34	Winny Chepngeno Langat (KEN)	D	~~63~~	63	67	36	83	~~90~~	~~90~~	36	150
35	Lydia Nakidde (UGA)	D	60	67	~~70~~	35	80	~~85~~	~~85~~	37	147
36	Alzahraa Khamshad (KUW)	D	60	65	~~70~~	38	75	80	~~85~~	38	145
37	Azra Alatović (BIH)	D	56	60	~~62~~	39	70	74	76	39	136
38	Hessa Al-Barrak (KSA)	D	~~50~~	~~50~~	50	40	65	70	~~75~~	40	120
—	Aysel Özkan (TUR)	A	~~97~~	97	~~101~~	7	~~115~~	~~117~~	~~118~~	—	—
—	Otgonchimegiin Tögs-Erdene (MGL)	A	~~99~~	~~101~~	~~101~~	—	112	~~116~~	~~116~~	10	—
—	Eliannys Franco (VEN)	A	87	91	93	10	~~113~~	~~113~~	~~113~~	—	—
—	Ganzorigiin Anuujin (MGL)	A	~~95~~	~~99~~	~~101~~	—	112	~~117~~	~~120~~	11	—
—	Natália Hušťavová (SVK)	C	~~82~~	~~83~~	~~83~~	—	~~103~~	~~103~~	~~104~~	—	—
—	Kiana Elliott (AUS)	B	—	—	—	—	—	—	—	—	—
—	Ine Andersson (NOR)	D	—	—	—	—	—	—	—	—	—
—	Rafif Jear (KSA)	D	Did not start								
