= Weightlifting at the 2017 Summer Universiade – Women's 69 kg =

Women's 69 kg at the XXIX Summer Universiade
- Venues: Tamkang University Shao-Mo Memorial Gymnasium 7F
- Dates: 23 August 2017
- Competitors: 22 from 18 nations

Medalists
1st place, gold medalist(s)		Hung Wan-ting	Chinese Taipei
2nd place, silver medalist(s)		Karina Goricheva	Kazakhstan
3rd place, bronze medalist(s)		Jong Chun-hui	North Korea

The women's 69 kg event at the 2017 Summer Universiade was held on 23 August at the Tamkang University Shao-Mo Memorial Gymnasium 7F.

== Records ==
Prior to this competition, the existing world and Universiade records were as follows.

- Initial records

Category		Nation	Athlete	Record	Place	Date	Meet
World record	Snatch	Russia	Oksana Slivenko	123 kg	Santo Domingo, Dominican Republic	4 October 2006	2006 World Championships
World record	Clean & Jerk	Russia	Zarema Kasayeva	157 kg	Doha, Qatar	13 November 2005	2005 World Championships
World record	Total	Russia	Oksana Slivenko	276 kg	Chiang Mai, Thailand	24 September 2007	2007 World Championships
Universiade records	Snatch	China (CHN)	Kang Yue	110 kg	Shenzhen, China	17 August 2011	2011 Summer Universiade
Universiade records	Clean & Jerk	Russia (RUS)	Oxana Slivenko	135 kg	Kazan, Russia	20 July 2013	2013 Summer Universiade
Universiade records	Total	Russia (RUS)	Oxana Slivenko	242 kg	Kazan, Russia	20 July 2013	2013 Summer Universiade

== Results ==
Rank	Athlete	Group	Body weight	Snatch (kg)				Clean & Jerk (kg)				Total
Rank	Athlete	Group	Body weight	1	2	3	Result	1	2	3	Result	Total
1st place, gold medalist(s)	Hung Wan-ting (TPE)	A	68.65	98	101	~~105~~	101	120	126	~~136~~	126	227
2nd place, silver medalist(s)	Karina Goricheva (KAZ)	A	67.71	100	105	108	108	118	~~122~~	~~122~~	118	226
3rd place, bronze medalist(s)	Jong Chun-hui (PRK)	A	67.32	~~97~~	97	~~101~~	97	117	121	~~125~~	121	218
4	Mariya Khlyan (UKR)	A	68.74	93	~~96~~	96	96	117	120	~~123~~	120	216
5	Lin Meng-shan (TPE)	A	68.71	90	93	96	96	110	113	~~115~~	113	209
6	Danielle Heathe Hudes (USA)	B	65.73	88	90	92	92	110	115	~~118~~	115	207
7	Ani Sargsian (RUS)	A	67.94	~~88~~	88	~~91~~	88	110	115	119	119	207
8	Park Min-young (KOR)	A	68.39	~~90~~	~~90~~	90	90	110	116	~~120~~	116	206
9	Iana Kondrashova (RUS)	B	66.11	90	~~95~~	~~95~~	90	~~113~~	113	~~115~~	113	203
10	Patrycja Piechowiak (POL)	A	68.98	90	92	~~94~~	92	110	~~113~~	~~113~~	110	202
11	Mariana G. Dumitrache (ROU)	A	66.58	~~83~~	83	87	87	107	~~112~~	112	112	199
12	Maria Aguinaga (MEX)	B	68.08	82	~~85~~	85	85	108	111	114	114	199
13	Zeynep Atakan (TUR)	A	67.13	~~83~~	83	87	87	111	~~116~~	~~116~~	111	198
14	Andreanne Messier (CAN)	B	68.95	87	~~90~~	~~90~~	87	106	~~108~~	108	108	195
15	Hinako Toda (JPN)	B	67.14	80	~~83~~	83	83	103	108	~~112~~	108	191
16	Nora Jäggi (SUI)	B	68.05	77	81	~~84~~	81	100	~~104~~	104	104	185
17	Ecaterina Cilcic (MDA)	B	68.23	80	~~84~~	~~84~~	80	100	~~104~~	~~104~~	100	180
18	Pernille Soelun Hansen (DEN)	B	68.88	72	75	~~78~~	75	96	~~100~~	100	100	175
19	Cait Maree Haniver (AUS)	B	68.85	73	~~77~~	77	77	94	~~97~~	97	97	174
20	Mette Fasmila Pedersen (DEN)	B	68.80	76	~~79~~	~~79~~	76	87	~~90~~	~~92~~	87	163
	Otgontuya Gongor (MGL)	A	68.62	~~94~~	~~94~~	~~94~~	–					–
	Magalie Roux (CAN)	B	68.67	~~85~~	~~85~~	~~85~~	–					–
