= 2013 World Weightlifting Championships – Women's 63 kg =

The women's competition in the –63 kg division was held on 23 October 2013 in Centennial Hall, Wrocław, Poland.

== Schedule ==
Date	Time	Event
23 October 2013	14:00	Group B
23 October 2013	16:55	Group A

== Medalists ==
Event	Gold		Silver		Bronze	
Snatch	Tima Turieva (RUS)	112 kg	Jo Pok-hyang (PRK)	109 kg	Deng Mengrong (CHN)	108 kg
Clean & Jerk	Tima Turieva (RUS)	140 kg	Jo Pok-hyang (PRK)	140 kg	Deng Mengrong (CHN)	136 kg
Total	Tima Turieva (RUS)	252 kg	Jo Pok-hyang (PRK)	249 kg	Deng Mengrong (CHN)	244 kg

== Records ==
Prior to this competition, the existing world records were as follows.

World Record	Snatch	Svetlana Tsarukaeva (RUS)	117 kg	Paris, France	8 November 2011
World Record	Clean & Jerk	Maiya Maneza (KAZ)	143 kg	Antalya, Turkey	20 September 2010
World Record	Total	Liu Haixia (CHN)	257 kg	Chiang Mai, Thailand	23 September 2007

== Results ==
Rank	Athlete	Group	Body weight	Snatch (kg)				Clean & Jerk (kg)				Total
Rank	Athlete	Group	Body weight	1	2	3	Rank	1	2	3	Rank	Total
1st place, gold medalist(s)	Tima Turieva (RUS)	A	61.58	105	110	112	1st place, gold medalist(s)	132	137	140	1st place, gold medalist(s)	252
2nd place, silver medalist(s)	Jo Pok-hyang (PRK)	A	62.29	103	~~108~~	109	2nd place, silver medalist(s)	~~135~~	135	140	2nd place, silver medalist(s)	249
3rd place, bronze medalist(s)	Deng Mengrong (CHN)	A	60.73	~~105~~	105	108	3rd place, bronze medalist(s)	133	136	~~141~~	3rd place, bronze medalist(s)	244
4	Karina Goricheva (KAZ)	A	62.94	102	107	~~111~~	4	127	~~133~~	135	5	242
5	Nastassia Novikava (BLR)	A	62.50	103	~~106~~	~~106~~	6	~~130~~	135	~~141~~	4	238
6	Milka Maneva (BUL)	A	62.61	96	98	100	8	122	125	126	6	226
7	Geralee Vega (USA)	A	61.87	95	~~100~~	100	7	125	~~127~~	~~127~~	7	225
8	Romela Begaj (ALB)	A	62.31	~~103~~	~~103~~	103	5	120	~~125~~	~~125~~	11	223
9	Nísida Palomeque (COL)	A	62.07	93	~~96~~	~~96~~	10	~~117~~	117	122	9	215
10	Iriner Jiménez (VEN)	B	62.23	86	91	93	11	116	~~121~~	122	10	215
11	Nidia Pardo (VEN)	B	61.03	85	~~90~~	90	12	115	120	122	8	212
12	Patricia Domínguez (MEX)	B	61.98	92	95	97	9	~~115~~	~~115~~	115	12	212
13	Anna Leśniewska (POL)	B	62.92	87	~~90~~	—	14	110	113	115	13	202
14	Reena (IND)	B	62.89	82	86	88	13	102	106	108	17	196
15	Katarzyna Ostapska (POL)	B	62.93	83	85	~~87~~	15	107	110	~~113~~	16	195
16	Hatice Demirel (TUR)	B	62.67	80	84	~~86~~	16	105	~~110~~	110	15	194
17	Moeha Matsumoto (JPN)	B	62.46	~~83~~	~~83~~	83	17	106	110	~~114~~	14	193
18	Emily Godley (GBR)	B	62.65	82	~~85~~	~~85~~	18	104	~~107~~	~~107~~	18	186
19	Tatiana Vásquez (ECU)	B	61.75	80	~~84~~	~~84~~	19	102	~~105~~	~~105~~	19	182
20	Silvana Vukas (SRB)	B	62.99	71	~~73~~	74	20	93	96	~~98~~	20	170
DQ	Namkhaidorjiin Bayarmaa (MGL)	A	62.80	~~95~~	~~99~~	99	—	121	~~126~~	~~126~~	—	—
