= 2021 World Weightlifting Championships – Women's 64 kg =

Weightlifting Championship

The women's 64 kilograms competition at the 2021 World Weightlifting Championships was held on 12 December 2021.

== Schedule ==
Date	Time	Event
12 December 2021	10:30	Group B
12 December 2021	16:00	Group A

== Medalists ==
Event	Gold		Silver		Bronze	
Snatch	Neama Said (EGY)	106 kg	Han Ji-an (KOR)	99 kg	Chen Wen-huei (TPE)	97 kg
Clean & Jerk	Chen Wen-huei (TPE)	135 kg	Neama Said (EGY)	127 kg	Anastasia Anzorova (RWF)	121 kg
Total	Neama Said (EGY)	233 kg	Chen Wen-huei (TPE)	232 kg	Park Min-kyung (KOR)	217 kg

== Records ==
Prior to this competition, the existing world records were as follows.

World Record	Snatch	Deng Wei (CHN)	117 kg	Tianjin, China	11 December 2019
World Record	Clean & Jerk	Deng Wei (CHN)	145 kg	Pattaya, Thailand	22 September 2019
World Record	Total	Deng Wei (CHN)	261 kg	Pattaya, Thailand	22 September 2019

== Results ==
Rank	Athlete	Group	Snatch (kg)				Clean & Jerk (kg)				Total
Rank	Athlete	Group	1	2	3	Rank	1	2	3	Rank	Total
1st place, gold medalist(s)	Neama Said (EGY)	A	100	103	106	1st place, gold medalist(s)	124	127	~~132~~	2nd place, silver medalist(s)	233
2nd place, silver medalist(s)	Chen Wen-huei (TPE)	A	97	~~101~~	~~101~~	3rd place, bronze medalist(s)	126	131	135	1st place, gold medalist(s)	232
3rd place, bronze medalist(s)	Park Min-kyung (KOR)	A	93	96	~~98~~	5	118	121	~~123~~	4	217
4	Han Ji-an (KOR)	A	~~99~~	~~99~~	99	2nd place, silver medalist(s)	~~116~~	116	~~120~~	7	215
5	Anastasia Anzorova (RWF)	A	~~93~~	~~93~~	93	7	117	121	~~123~~	3rd place, bronze medalist(s)	214
6	Aysel Özkan (TUR)	A	~~97~~	97	~~100~~	4	116	~~119~~	~~119~~	6	213
7	Sarah Cochrane (AUS)	A	90	95	~~100~~	6	110	115	~~121~~	8	210
8	Rodsukon Sonkaew (THA)	A	~~92~~	92	~~95~~	10	~~117~~	117	~~119~~	5	209
9	Tsabitha Alfiah Ramadani (INA)	A	92	~~98~~	~~98~~	9	105	110	~~115~~	10	202
10	Marit Årdalsbakke (NOR)	B	87	90	92	8	105	~~108~~	108	11	200
11	Restu Anggi (INA)	A	86	~~91~~	~~92~~	12	110	~~115~~	~~115~~	9	196
12	Rachel Siemens (CAN)	B	88	~~90~~	~~90~~	11	107	~~111~~	~~111~~	12	195
13	Yasmin Zammit Stevens (MLT)	B	80	82	84	14	100	103	~~106~~	16	187
14	Margaret Colonia (PHI)	B	~~82~~	~~82~~	82	15	105	~~108~~	~~108~~	14	187
15	Katla Björk Ketilsdóttir (ISL)	B	79	~~85~~	85	13	98	101	~~103~~	17	186
16	Eleni Revenikioti (GRE)	B	~~80~~	80	~~83~~	18	102	104	106	13	186
17	Helena Rønnebæk (DEN)	B	80	~~82~~	~~83~~	17	102	104	~~107~~	15	184
18	Komal Khan (IND)	B	~~81~~	~~81~~	81	16	99	~~103~~	~~103~~	18	180
19	Elizabeth Granger (NZL)	B	73	76	~~79~~	20	~~90~~	~~90~~	90	20	166
20	Arshika Vijayabaskar (SRI)	B	65	~~70~~	70	21	85	90	~~94~~	19	160
—	Amalía Ósk Sigurðardóttir (ISL)	B	78	~~82~~	~~83~~	19	~~95~~	~~95~~	~~101~~	—	—
