= Weightlifting at the 2020 Summer Olympics – Women's 64 kg =

Olympic competition

Women's 64 kg at the Games of the XXXII Olympiad
- Venue: Tokyo International Forum
- Date: 27 July 2021
- Competitors: 14 from 14 nations
- Winning total: 236 kg

Medalists
1st place, gold medalist(s)		Maude Charron	Canada
2nd place, silver medalist(s)		Giorgia Bordignon	Italy
3rd place, bronze medalist(s)		Chen Wen-huei	Chinese Taipei

The women's 64 kg weightlifting competition at the 2020 Summer Olympics in Tokyo took place on 27 July at the Tokyo International Forum. Maude Charron won the gold, with a combined lift of 236 kg.

The bouquets were presented by IWF Interim President Dr. Michael Irani (Great Britain), and the medals were presented by IOC Member Stefan Holm (Olympic Champion in athletics, Sweden).

== Records ==
Prior to this competition, the existing world and Olympic records were as follows.

World Record	Snatch	Deng Wei (CHN)	117 kg	Tianjin, China	11 December 2019
World Record	Clean & Jerk	Deng Wei (CHN)	145 kg	Pattaya, Thailand	22 September 2019
World Record	Total	Deng Wei (CHN)	261 kg	Pattaya, Thailand	22 September 2019
Olympic Record	Snatch	Olympic Standard	108 kg	—	1 November 2018
Olympic Record	Clean & Jerk	Olympic Standard	134 kg	—	1 November 2018
Olympic Record	Total	Olympic Standard	242 kg	—	1 November 2018

== Results ==
Rank	Athlete	Nation	Group	Body weight	Snatch (kg)				Clean & Jerk (kg)				Total
Rank	Athlete	Nation	Group	Body weight	1	2	3	Result	1	2	3	Result	Total
1st place, gold medalist(s)	Maude Charron	Canada	A	63.30	102	105	~~108~~	105	~~128~~	128	131	131	236
2nd place, silver medalist(s)	Giorgia Bordignon	Italy	A	63.70	98	101	104	104	121	126	128	128	232
3rd place, bronze medalist(s)	Chen Wen-huei	Chinese Taipei	A	63.90	97	100	103	103	127	~~130~~	~~130~~	127	230
4	Mercedes Pérez	Colombia	A	63.70	~~101~~	101	~~105~~	101	126	~~131~~	~~131~~	126	227
5	Sarah Davies	Great Britain	A	63.90	97	~~100~~	100	100	~~127~~	127	~~133~~	127	227
6	Angie Palacios	Ecuador	A	63.55	100	104	~~108~~	104	122	~~127~~	~~127~~	122	226
7	Elreen Ando	Philippines	A	63.15	96	~~99~~	100	100	118	~~122~~	122	122	222
8	Marina Rodríguez	Cuba	A	64.00	95	~~98~~	98	98	118	~~123~~	123	123	221
9	Nuray Levent	Turkey	A	63.10	97	100	~~103~~	100	116	120	~~124~~	120	220
10	Lisa Schweizer	Germany	A	63.60	97	100	~~102~~	100	117	~~121~~	~~121~~	117	217
11	Kiana Elliott	Australia	B	63.40	93	97	101	101	~~108~~	108	~~111~~	108	209
12	Sema Ludrick	Nicaragua	B	64.00	~~87~~	87	~~92~~	87	110	115	~~118~~	115	202
13	Yasmin Zammit Stevens	Malta	B	63.70	~~84~~	84	~~87~~	84	~~101~~	101	105	105	189
–	Chaima Rahmouni	Tunisia	B	62.90	88	91	~~93~~	91	~~110~~	~~110~~	~~111~~	–	–
