= Weightlifting at the 2016 Summer Olympics – Women's 63 kg =

Women's 63 kg at the Games of the XXXI Olympiad
- Venue: Riocentro
- Date: 9 August 2016
- Competitors: 14 from 14 nations
- Winning total: 262 kg WR

Medalists
1st place, gold medalist(s)		Deng Wei	China
2nd place, silver medalist(s)		Choe Hyo-sim	North Korea
3rd place, bronze medalist(s)		Karina Goricheva	Kazakhstan

The Women's 63 kg weightlifting competitions at the 2016 Summer Olympics in Rio de Janeiro took place on 9 August at the Pavilion 2 of Riocentro.

== Schedule ==
All times are Time in Brazil (UTC-03:00)

Date	Time	Event
9 August 2016	12:30	Group B
9 August 2016	15:30	Group A

== Records ==
Prior to this competition, the existing world and Olympic records were as follows.

World record	Snatch	Svetlana Tsarukaeva (RUS)	117 kg	Paris, France	8 November 2011
World record	Clean & Jerk	Deng Wei (CHN)	146 kg	Houston, United States	25 November 2015
World record	Total	Lin Tzu-chi (TPE)	261 kg	Incheon, South Korea	23 September 2014
Olympic record	Snatch	Hanna Batsiushka (BLR)	115 kg	Athens, Greece	18 August 2004
Olympic record	Clean & Jerk	Nataliya Skakun (UKR)	135 kg	Athens, Greece	18 August 2004
Olympic record	Total	Maiya Maneza (KAZ)	245 kg	London, United Kingdom	31 July 2012

== Results ==
Rank	Athlete	Nation	Group	Body weight	Snatch (kg)				Clean & Jerk (kg)				Total
Rank	Athlete	Nation	Group	Body weight	1	2	3	Result	1	2	3	Result	Total
1st place, gold medalist(s)	Deng Wei	China	A	62.34	108	112	115	115	138	147	–	147 WR	262 WR
2nd place, silver medalist(s)	Choe Hyo-sim	North Korea	A	62.17	105	~~109~~	~~111~~	105	135	138	143	143	248
3rd place, bronze medalist(s)	Karina Goricheva	Kazakhstan	A	62.66	~~107~~	107	111	111	132	~~137~~	~~137~~	132	243
4	Mercedes Pérez	Colombia	A	62.74	100	~~104~~	104	104	125	130	~~137~~	130	234
5	Eva Gurrola	Mexico	A	62.60	97	~~100~~	100	100	120	~~125~~	~~125~~	120	220
6	Giorgia Bordignon	Italy	A	62.75	94	~~98~~	98	98	115	119	~~123~~	119	217
7	Esraa El-Sayed	Egypt	B	61.98	93	97	100	100	112	116	~~118~~	116	216
8	Marina Rodríguez	Cuba	B	62.20	87	91	94	94	117	121	~~123~~	121	215
9	Namika Matsumoto	Japan	B	62.86	90	~~94~~	~~95~~	90	107	111	115	115	205
10	Anni Vuohijoki	Finland	B	62.26	85	~~88~~	~~89~~	85	104	107	~~113~~	107	192
11	Joana Palacios	Argentina	B	62.95	80	83	~~86~~	83	101	102	107	107	190
12	Elisa Ravololoniaina	Madagascar	B	61.91	75	80	85	85	95	~~100~~	100	100	185
13	Mehtap Kurnaz	Turkey	B	62.16	78	81	~~83~~	81	100	~~103~~	~~105~~	100	181
–	Siripuch Gulnoi	Thailand	A	62.56	105	108	~~110~~	108	~~132~~	~~132~~	~~132~~	–	–

== New records ==
Clean & Jerk	138 kg	Deng Wei (CHN)	OR
Total	253 kg	Deng Wei (CHN)	OR
Clean & Jerk	143 kg	Choe Hyo-sim (PRK)	OR
Clean & Jerk	147 kg	Deng Wei (CHN)	OR, WR
Total	262 kg	Deng Wei (CHN)	OR, WR
