= List of Kiribati records in Olympic weightlifting =

The following are the national records in Olympic weightlifting in Kiribati. Records are maintained in each weight class for the snatch lift, clean and jerk lift, and the total for both lifts by the Kiribati Weightlifting Association.

== Current records ==
=== Men ===
Event	Record	Athlete	Date	Meet	Place	Ref
60 kg
Snatch	101 kg	Reinataake Takenteiti	27 April 2026	Oceania Championships	Apia, Samoa	
Clean & Jerk	125 kg	Reinataake Takenteiti	27 April 2026	Oceania Championships	Apia, Samoa	
Total	226 kg	Reinataake Takenteiti	27 April 2026	Oceania Championships	Apia, Samoa	
65 kg
Snatch	105 kg	Kaimauri Erati	27 April 2026	Oceania Championships	Apia, Samoa	
Clean & Jerk	130 kg	Kaimauri Erati	27 April 2026	Oceania Championships	Apia, Samoa	
Total	235 kg	Kaimauri Erati	27 April 2026	Oceania Championships	Apia, Samoa	
71 kg
Snatch						
Clean & Jerk						
Total						
79 kg
Snatch	129 kg	Ruben Katoatau	27 July 2026	Commonwealth Games	Glasgow, United Kingdom	
Clean & Jerk	170 kg	Ruben Katoatau	29 April 2026	Oceania Championships	Apia, Samoa	
Total	297 kg	Ruben Katoatau	29 April 2026	Oceania Championships	Apia, Samoa	
88 kg
Snatch	120 kg	Tekina Moaniba	30 April 2026	Oceania Championships	Apia, Samoa	
Clean & Jerk	146 kg	Tekina Moaniba	30 April 2026	Oceania Championships	Apia, Samoa	
Total	266 kg	Tekina Moaniba	30 April 2026	Oceania Championships	Apia, Samoa	
94 kg
Snatch	100 kg	Buee Iororimo	4 July 2025	Pacific Mini Games	Meyuns, Palau	
Clean & Jerk	135 kg	Buee Iororimo	4 July 2025	Pacific Mini Games	Meyuns, Palau	
Total	235 kg	Buee Iororimo	4 July 2025	Pacific Mini Games	Meyuns, Palau	
110 kg
Snatch						
Clean & Jerk						
Total						
+110 kg
Snatch						
Clean & Jerk						
Total						

=== Women ===
Event	Record	Athlete	Date	Meet	Place	Ref
48 kg
Snatch						
Clean & Jerk						
Total						
53 kg
Snatch						
Clean & Jerk	60 kg	Miita Maikara	2 July 2025	Pacific Mini Games	Meyuns, Palau	
Total						
58 kg
Snatch						
Clean & Jerk						
Total						
63 kg
Snatch						
Clean & Jerk						
Total						
69 kg
Snatch	70 kg	Teangiro Taauta	3 July 2025	Pacific Mini Games	Meyuns, Palau	
Clean & Jerk	90 kg	Teangiro Taauta	3 July 2025	Pacific Mini Games	Meyuns, Palau	
Total	160 kg	Teangiro Taauta	3 July 2025	Pacific Mini Games	Meyuns, Palau	
77 kg
Snatch						
Clean & Jerk						
Total						
86 kg
Snatch	71 kg	Kimeata Rakenang	4 July 2025	Pacific Mini Games	Meyuns, Palau	
Clean & Jerk	85 kg	Kimeata Rakenang	4 July 2025	Pacific Mini Games	Meyuns, Palau	
Total	156 kg	Kimeata Rakenang	4 July 2025	Pacific Mini Games	Meyuns, Palau	
+86 kg
Snatch	75 kg	Tenganga Taunikarawa	5 July 2025	Pacific Mini Games	Meyuns, Palau	
Clean & Jerk	90 kg	Tenganga Taunikarawa	5 July 2025	Pacific Mini Games	Meyuns, Palau	
Total	165 kg	Tenganga Taunikarawa	5 July 2025	Pacific Mini Games	Meyuns, Palau	

== Historical records ==
=== Men (2018–2025) ===
Event	Record	Athlete	Date	Meet	Place	Ref
55 kg
Snatch						
Clean & Jerk						
Total						
61 kg
Snatch	100 kg	Kaimauri Erati	20 November 2023	Pacific Games	Honiara, Solomon Islands	
Clean & Jerk	120 kg	Kaimauri Erati	20 November 2023	Pacific Games	Honiara, Solomon Islands	
Total	220 kg	Kaimauri Erati	20 November 2023	Pacific Games	Honiara, Solomon Islands	
67 kg
Snatch	122 kg	Ruben Katoatau	July 2019	Pacific Games	Apia, Samoa	
Clean & Jerk	160 kg	Ruben Katoatau	July 2019	Pacific Games	Apia, Samoa	
Total	282 kg	Ruben Katoatau	July 2019	Pacific Games	Apia, Samoa	
73 kg
Snatch	124 kg	Taretiita Tabaroua	July 2019	Pacific Games	Apia, Samoa	
Clean & Jerk	158 kg	Taretiita Tabaroua	July 2019	Pacific Games	Apia, Samoa	
Total	282 kg	Taretiita Tabaroua	July 2019	Pacific Games	Apia, Samoa	
81 kg
Snatch	136 kg	Ruben Katoatau	10 September 2023	World Championships	Riyadh, Saudi Arabia	
Clean & Jerk	172 kg	Ruben Katoatau	10 September 2023	World Championships	Riyadh, Saudi Arabia	
Total	308 kg	Ruben Katoatau	10 September 2023	World Championships	Riyadh, Saudi Arabia	
89 kg
Snatch						
Clean & Jerk						
Total						
96 kg
Snatch						
Clean & Jerk						
Total						
102 kg
Snatch	142 kg	David Katoatau	13 July 2019	Pacific Games	Apia, Samoa	
Clean & Jerk	196 kg	David Katoatau	13 July 2019	Pacific Games	Apia, Samoa	
Total	338 kg	David Katoatau	13 July 2019	Pacific Games	Apia, Samoa	
109 kg
Snatch						
Clean & Jerk						
Total						
+109 kg
Snatch						
Clean & Jerk						
Total						

=== Women (2018–2025) ===
Event	Record	Athlete	Date	Meet	Place	Ref
45 kg
Snatch	52 kg	Tebora Willy	9 July 2019	Pacific Games	Apia, Samoa	
Clean & Jerk	67 kg	Tebora Willy	9 July 2019	Pacific Games	Apia, Samoa	
Total	119 kg	Tebora Willy	9 July 2019	Pacific Games	Apia, Samoa	
49 kg
Snatch						
Clean & Jerk						
Total						
55 kg
Snatch						
Clean & Jerk						
Total						
59 kg
Snatch	53 kg	Tabureiti Mauika	21 November 2023	Pacific Games	Honiara, Solomon Islands	
Clean & Jerk	75 kg	Tabureiti Mauika	21 November 2023	Pacific Games	Honiara, Solomon Islands	
Total	128 kg	Tabureiti Mauika	21 November 2023	Pacific Games	Honiara, Solomon Islands	
64 kg
Snatch	60 kg	Teangiro Taauta	21 November 2023	Pacific Games	Honiara, Solomon Islands	
Clean & Jerk	75 kg	Teangiro Taauta	21 November 2023	Pacific Games	Honiara, Solomon Islands	
Total	135 kg	Teangiro Taauta	21 November 2023	Pacific Games	Honiara, Solomon Islands	
71 kg
Snatch						
Clean & Jerk						
Total						
76 kg
Snatch						
Clean & Jerk						
Total						
81 kg
Snatch						
Clean & Jerk						
Total						
87 kg
Snatch						
Clean & Jerk						
Total						
+87 kg
Snatch						
Clean & Jerk						
Total						

=== Men (1998–2018) ===
Event	Record	Athlete	Date	Meet	Place	Ref
56 kg
Snatch	69 kg	Tibwere Kuaaba	23 May 2016	Oceania Championships	Suva, Fiji	
Clean & Jerk	81 kg	Tibwere Kuaaba	23 May 2016	Oceania Championships	Suva, Fiji	
Total	150 kg	Tibwere Kuaaba	23 May 2016	Oceania Championships	Suva, Fiji	
62 kg
Snatch	90 kg	Takirua Betero	5 April 2018	Commonwealth Games	Gold Coast, Australia	
Clean & Jerk	120 kg	Takirua Betero	5 December 2017	Pacific Mini Games	Port Vila, Vanuatu	
Total	210 kg	Takirua Betero	5 April 2018	Commonwealth Games	Gold Coast, Australia	
69 kg
Snatch	120 kg	Ruben Katoatau	6 April 2018	Commonwealth Games	Gold Coast, Australia	
Clean & Jerk	160 kg	Ruben Katoatau	6 April 2018	Commonwealth Games	Gold Coast, Australia	
Total	280 kg	Ruben Katoatau	6 April 2018	Commonwealth Games	Gold Coast, Australia	
77 kg
Snatch	130 kg	Taretiita Tabaroua	7 April 2018	Commonwealth Games	Gold Coast, Australia	
Clean & Jerk	170 kg	Taretiita Tabaroua	21 September 2017	Asian Indoor and Martial Arts Games	Ashgabat, Turkmenistan	
Total	298 kg	Taretiita Tabaroua	6 December 2017	Pacific Mini Games	Port Vila, Vanuatu	
85 kg
Snatch	127 kg	Takenibeia Toromon	26 May 2016	Oceania Championships	Suva, Fiji	
Clean & Jerk	165 kg	Takenibeia Toromon	26 May 2016	Oceania Championships	Suva, Fiji	
Total	292 kg	Takenibeia Toromon	26 May 2016	Oceania Championships	Suva, Fiji	
94 kg
Snatch						
Clean & Jerk						
Total						
105 kg
Snatch	148 kg	David Katoatau	28 May 2016	Oceania Championships	Suva, Fiji	
Clean & Jerk	206 kg	David Katoatau	5 September 2013		Wallis and Futuna	
Total	350 kg	David Katoatau	26 November 2015	World Championships	Houston, United States	
+105 kg
Snatch						
Clean & Jerk						
Total						

=== Women (1998–2018) ===
Event	Record	Athlete	Date	Meet	Place	Ref
48 kg
Snatch						
Clean and jerk						
Total						
53 kg
Snatch						
Clean and jerk						
Total						
58 kg
Snatch						
Clean and jerk						
Total						
63 kg
Snatch						
Clean and jerk						
Total						
69 kg
Snatch	73 kg	Tiiau Bakaekiri	8 April 2018	Commonwealth Games	Gold Coast, Australia	
Clean and jerk	95 kg	Tiiau Bakaekiri	8 April 2018	Commonwealth Games	Gold Coast, Australia	
Total	168 kg	Tiiau Bakaekiri	8 April 2018	Commonwealth Games	Gold Coast, Australia	
75 kg
Snatch						
Clean and jerk						
Total						
+75 kg
Snatch						
Clean and jerk						
Total						
