= 2013 Commonwealth Weightlifting Championships =

- Host city: Batu Uban, Malaysia
- Dates: 25–30 November 2013
- Main venue: Youth & Sport Complex

The 2013 Commonwealth Weightlifting Championships were held at the Youth & Sport Complex in Batu Uban, Penang, Malaysia from 25 to 30 November 2013.

Results shown below are for the senior competition only. Junior and youth results are cited here and here respectively (all results also cited here).

== Medal table ==
* Host nation (Malaysia)

Rank	Nation	Gold	Silver	Bronze	Total
1	Nigeria	4	2	3	9
2	India	3	3	5	11
3	Malaysia*	2	1	1	4
3	Samoa	2	1	1	4
5	Kiribati	1	1	0	2
6	New Zealand	1	0	1	2
6	Papua New Guinea	1	0	1	2
8	Nauru	1	0	0	1
9	Sri Lanka	0	2	1	3
10	Australia	0	1	2	3
11	Barbados	0	1	0	1
11	Canada	0	1	0	1
11	Seychelles	0	1	0	1
11	South Africa	0	1	0	1
Totals (14 entries)		15	15	15	45

== Medal summary ==
=== Men ===
Event	Gold		Silver		Bronze	
56 kg	Sukhen Dey; India	254 kg	Thilanka Palangasinghe; Sri Lanka	241 kg	Sangeeth Wijesuriya; Sri Lanka	233 kg
62 kg (Note: Mohd Dinie Akmal of Malaysia, who lifted 267 kg for gold, tested positive for stanozolol and was subsequently disqualified.)	Vaipava Ioane; Samoa	263 kg	Indika Dissanayake; Sri Lanka	262 kg	Dilli Senthamizh Selvan; India	258 kg
69 kg	Mohd Hafifi Mansor; Malaysia	307 kg	Takenibeia Toromon; Kiribati	288 kg	Yinka Ayenuwa; Nigeria	285 kg
77 kg	Sathish Sivalingam; India	317 kg	François Etoundi; Australia	312 kg	Mamdum Seldum; Nigeria	300 kg
85 kg	Richie Patterson; New Zealand	343 kg	Vikas Thakur; India	322 kg	Gideon Aigbefoh; Nigeria	320 kg
94 kg	Steven Kari; Papua New Guinea	352 kg	Chandrakant Dadu Mali; India	341 kg	Simplice Ribouem; Australia	337 kg
105 kg	David Katoatau; Kiribati	350 kg	Ivorn McKnee; Barbados	350 kg	Tovia Opeloge; Samoa	343 kg
+105 kg	Itte Detenamo; Nauru	360 kg	Mhd Azim Najmi; Malaysia	348 kg	Sandeep Kumar; India	332 kg

=== Women ===
Event	Gold		Silver		Bronze	
48 kg	Saikhom Mirabai Chanu; India	166 kg	Portia Vries; South Africa	157 kg	Tegan Napper; Australia	144 kg
53 kg	Azizah Fadzil; Malaysia	175 kg	Chika Amalaha; Nigeria	175 kg	Sharifah Inani Najwa; Malaysia	171 kg
58 kg	Ndidi Winifred; Nigeria	200 kg	Clementina Agricole; Seychelles	190 kg	Minati Sethi; India	190 kg
63 kg	Obioma Okoli; Nigeria	222 kg	Reena; India	192 kg	Vandna Gupta; India	189 kg
69 kg	Itohan Ebireguesele; Nigeria	215 kg	Vanissa Lui; Samoa	192 kg	Guba Hale; Papua New Guinea	190 kg
75 kg	Mary Opeloge; Samoa	240 kg	Prabdeep Kaur Sanghera; Canada	197 kg	Krishna Kumari; India	186 kg
+75 kg	Mariam Usman; Nigeria	272 kg	Obehi Joseph; Nigeria	245 kg	Tracey Lambrechs; New Zealand	236 kg
