= List of Lebanese records in Olympic weightlifting =

The following are the records of Lebanon in Olympic weightlifting. Records are maintained in each weight class for the snatch lift, clean and jerk lift, and the total for both lifts by the Lebanese Association of Weightlifting.

== Current records ==
=== Men ===
Event	Record	Athlete	Date	Meet	Place	Ref
60 kg
Snatch						
Clean & Jerk						
Total						
65 kg
Snatch						
Clean & Jerk						
Total						
71 kg
Snatch						
Clean & Jerk						
Total						
79 kg
Snatch						
Clean & Jerk						
Total						
88 kg
Snatch						
Clean & Jerk						
Total						
94 kg
Snatch						
Clean & Jerk						
Total						
110 kg
Snatch						
Clean & Jerk						
Total						
+110 kg
Snatch	120 kg	Mohammad Zeitoun	12 November 2025	Islamic Solidarity Games	Riyadh, Saudi Arabia	
Clean & Jerk	155 kg	Mohammad Zeitoun	12 November 2025	Islamic Solidarity Games	Riyadh, Saudi Arabia	
Total	275 kg	Mohammad Zeitoun	12 November 2025	Islamic Solidarity Games	Riyadh, Saudi Arabia	

=== Women ===
Event	Record	Athlete	Date	Meet	Place	Ref
48 kg
Snatch						
Clean & Jerk						
Total						
53 kg
Snatch						
Clean & Jerk						
Total						
58 kg
Snatch						
Clean & Jerk						
Total						
63 kg
Snatch	79 kg	Alexa Marie Mina	10 November 2025	Islamic Solidarity Games	Riyadh, Saudi Arabia	
Clean & Jerk	100 kg	Alexa Marie Mina	10 November 2025	Islamic Solidarity Games	Riyadh, Saudi Arabia	
Total	179 kg	Alexa Marie Mina	10 November 2025	Islamic Solidarity Games	Riyadh, Saudi Arabia	
69 kg
Snatch	94 kg	Mahassen Hala Fattouh	10 November 2025	Islamic Solidarity Games	Riyadh, Saudi Arabia	
Clean & Jerk	114 kg	Mahassen Hala Fattouh	10 November 2025	Islamic Solidarity Games	Riyadh, Saudi Arabia	
Total	208 kg	Mahassen Hala Fattouh	10 November 2025	Islamic Solidarity Games	Riyadh, Saudi Arabia	
77 kg
Snatch						
Clean & Jerk						
Total						
86 kg
Snatch						
Clean & Jerk						
Total						
+86 kg
Snatch						
Clean & Jerk						
Total						

== Historical records ==
=== Men (2018–2025) ===
Event	Record	Athlete	Date	Meet	Place	Ref
55 kg
Snatch						
Clean and Jerk						
Total						
61 kg
Snatch						
Clean & Jerk						
Total						
67 kg
Snatch						
Clean & Jerk						
Total						
73 kg
Snatch						
Clean and Jerk						
Total						
81 kg
Snatch						
Clean and Jerk						
Total						
89 kg
Snatch						
Clean and Jerk						
Total						
96 kg
Snatch						
Clean and Jerk						
Total						
102 kg
Snatch						
Clean and Jerk						
Total						
109 kg
Snatch						
Clean and Jerk						
Total						
+109 kg
Snatch						
Clean and Jerk						
Total						

=== Women (2018–2025) ===
Event	Record	Athlete	Date	Meet	Place	Ref
45 kg
Snatch						
Clean & Jerk						
Total						
49 kg
Snatch						
Clean & Jerk						
Total						
55 kg
Snatch						
Clean & Jerk						
Total						
59 kg
Snatch						
Clean & Jerk						
Total						
64 kg
Snatch	95 kg	Mahassen Fattouh	3 March 2020	39th Torneo Int. Manuel Suarez In Memoriam	Havana, Cuba	
Clean & Jerk	121 kg	Mahassen Fattouh	18 September 2019	World Championships	Pattaya, Thailand	
Total	212 kg	Mahassen Fattouh	3 March 2020	39th Torneo Int. Manuel Suarez In Memoriam	Havana, Cuba	
71 kg
Snatch	94 kg	Mahassen Fattouh	9 May 2023	Asian Championships	Jinju, South Korea	
Clean & Jerk	118 kg	Mahassen Fattouh	14 June 2023	IWF Grand Prix	Havana, Cuba	
Total	210 kg	Mahassen Fattouh	4 December 2023	IWF Grand Prix II	Doha, Qatar	
76 kg
Snatch	96 kg	Mahassen Fattouh	8 April 2024	World Cup	Phuket, Thailand	
Clean & Jerk	124 kg	Mahassen Fattouh	1 August 2021	Olympic Games	Tokyo, Japan	
Total	217 kg	Mahassen Fattouh	1 August 2021	Olympic Games	Tokyo, Japan	
81 kg
Snatch						
Clean & Jerk						
Total						
87 kg
Snatch						
Clean & Jerk						
Total						
+87 kg
Snatch						
Clean & Jerk						
Total						
