= Deng Mengrong =

Chinese weightlifter (born 1990)

Personal information
- Nationality: Chinese
- Born: 5 March 1990 (age 36)
- Weight: 57.06 kg (126 lb)

Sport
- Country: China
- Sport: Weightlifting
- Event: 58 kg

Achievements and titles
- Personal bests: Snatch: 108 kg (2012); Clean and jerk: 136 kg (2012); Total: 244 kg (2012)
Medal record
Women's weightlifting
Representing China
World Championships
Gold medal – first place	2014 Almaty	–58 kg
Silver medal – second place	2015 Houston	–58 kg
Bronze medal – third place	2013 Wrocław	–63 kg
Asian Championships
Gold medal – first place	2012 Pyeongtaek	–63kg

Deng Mengrong (鄧猛榮; born 5 March 1990) is a Chinese weightlifter. She competed at the 2013 World Championships in the Women's 63 kg, winning the bronze medal. She won Gold in the 2014 World Weightlifting Championships in Almaty.
