= Hatice Demirel =

Turkish weightlifter

Personal information
- Full name: Hatice Demirel
- Born: 27 August 1994 (age 31)
- Weight: 68.69 kg (151.4 lb)

Sport
- Country: Turkey
- Sport: Weightlifting
- Weight class: 69 kilograms (152 lb)
- Team: National team
- Updated on 4 September 2016

Hatice Demirel (born 27 August 1994) is a Turkish weightlifter, competing in the 69 kg category and representing Turkey at international competitions. She competed at world championships, most recently at the 2014 World Weightlifting Championships.

== Major results ==
Year	Venue	Weight	Snatch (kg)				Clean & Jerk (kg)				Total	Rank
Year	Venue	Weight	1	2	3	Rank	1	2	3	Rank	Total	Rank
World Championships
2014	Almaty, Kazakhstan	69 kg	85	~~88~~	~~88~~	24	112	~~116~~	~~116~~	19	197	22
2013	Wrocław, Poland	63 kg	80	84	~~86~~	16	105	~~110~~	110	15	194	16
