= Chen Wen-huei =

Taiwanese weightlifter (born 1997)

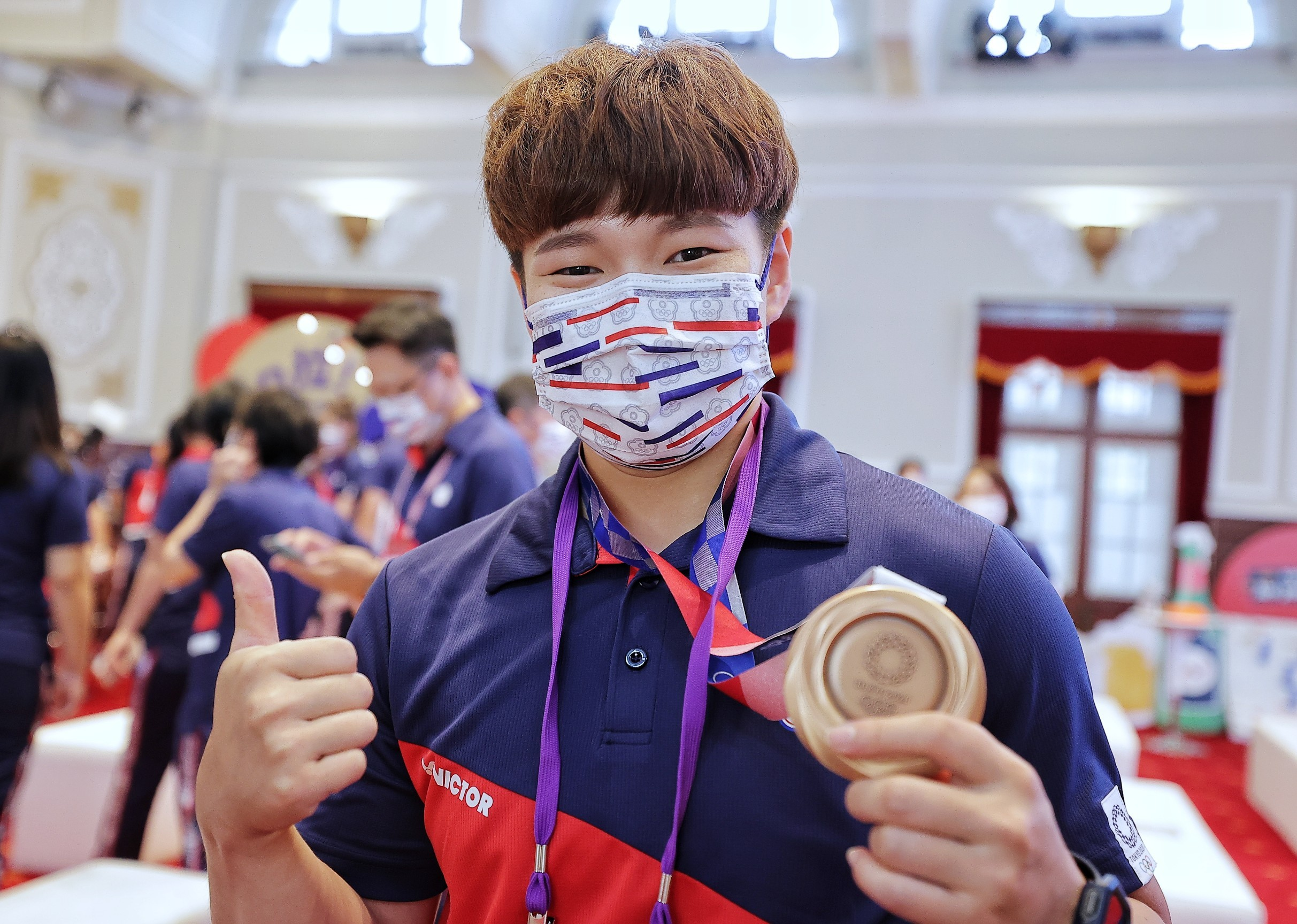
- Chen in 2021

Personal information
- Nationality: Taiwanese
- Born: 23 February 1997 (age 29) Taipei County, Taiwan
- Education: National Taiwan Normal University

Sport
- Sport: Weightlifting
- Coached by: Huang Dade, Ho Hsiao-Chun
Medal record
Women's weightlifting
Representing Chinese Taipei
Olympic Games
Bronze medal – third place	2020 Tokyo	64 kg
World Championships
Silver medal – second place	2021 Tashkent	64 kg
Asian Games
Silver medal – second place	2026 Aichi–Nagoya	69 kg
Asian Championships
Gold medal – first place	2020 Tashkent	64 kg
Silver medal – second place	2024 Tashkent	71 kg
Silver medal – second place	2025 Jiangshan	76 kg
Silver medal – second place	2026 Gandhinagar	69 kg
Bronze medal – third place	2023 Jinju	71 kg

Chen Wen-huei (Chinese: 陳玟卉; pinyin: Chén Wénhuì, born 23 February 1997) is a Taiwanese weightlifter.

== Early life ==
Chen was raised in New Taipei City. She took up weightlifting in her second year of middle school. Originally she trained as a triathlete but disliked running, and a weightlifting coach convinced her to switch sports. She chose weightlifting because the training facility had air conditioning, provided food, and had shorter training sessions.

== Career ==
At the 2017 Asian Indoor and Martial Arts Games held in Ashgabat, Turkmenistan, Chen finished in fifth place in the women's 58 kg event.

In 2019, she competed in the women's 64 kg event at the World Weightlifting Championships held in Pattaya, Thailand.

She represented Chinese Taipei at the 2020 Summer Olympics in Tokyo and she won the bronze medal in the women's 64 kg event. In December 2021, she won the silver medal in the women's 64 kg event at the World Weightlifting Championships held in Tashkent, Uzbekistan.

In 2024, she competed in the women's 71 kg event at the Summer Olympics held in Paris, France. She lifted 236 kg in total and placed sixth.

== Achievements ==
Year	Venue	Weight	Snatch (kg)				Clean & Jerk (kg)				Total	Rank
Year	Venue	Weight	1	2	3	Rank	1	2	3	Rank	Total	Rank
Olympic Games
2021	Tokyo, Japan	64 kg	97	100	103	—N/a	127	~~130~~	~~130~~	—N/a	230	3rd place, bronze medalist(s)
2024	Paris, France	71 kg	~~102~~	103	~~106~~	—N/a	133	~~139~~	~~140~~	—N/a	236	6
World Championships
2019	Pattaya, Thailand	64 kg	92	~~96~~	~~98~~	21	118	123	~~128~~	10	215	13
2021	Tashkent, Uzbekistan	64 kg	97	~~101~~	~~101~~	3rd place, bronze medalist(s)	126	131	135	1st place, gold medalist(s)	232	2nd place, silver medalist(s)
2023	Riyadh, Saudi Arabia	71 kg	99	104	~~107~~	11	131	~~136~~	~~136~~	8	235	10
IWF World Cup
2024	Phuket, Thailand	71 kg	~~103~~	105	~~108~~	15	~~133~~	135	141	4	246	4
Asian Games
2023	Hangzhou, China	76 kg	101	~~105~~	105	—N/a	131	~~135~~	137	—N/a	242	4
Asian Championships
2019	Ningbo, China	64 kg	~~93~~	93	98	4	116	123	~~127~~	4	221	4
2021	Tashkent, Uzbekistan	64 kg	94	98	100	1st place, gold medalist(s)	119	125	128	1st place, gold medalist(s)	228	1st place, gold medalist(s)
2022	Manama, Bahrain	64 kg	~~98~~	~~98~~	~~99~~	—	—	—	—	—	—	—
2023	Jinju, South Korea	71 kg	93	97	101	6	123	128	131	3rd place, bronze medalist(s)	232	3rd place, bronze medalist(s)
2024	Tashkent, Uzbekistan	71 kg	102	106	108	2nd place, silver medalist(s)	128	~~137~~	~~137~~	4	236	2nd place, silver medalist(s)
2025	Jiangshan, China	76 kg	100	105	109	2nd place, silver medalist(s)	~~133~~	~~133~~	133	3rd place, bronze medalist(s)	242	2nd place, silver medalist(s)
