= Galya Shatova =

Bulgarian weightlifter (born 2001)

Galya Anetova Shatova
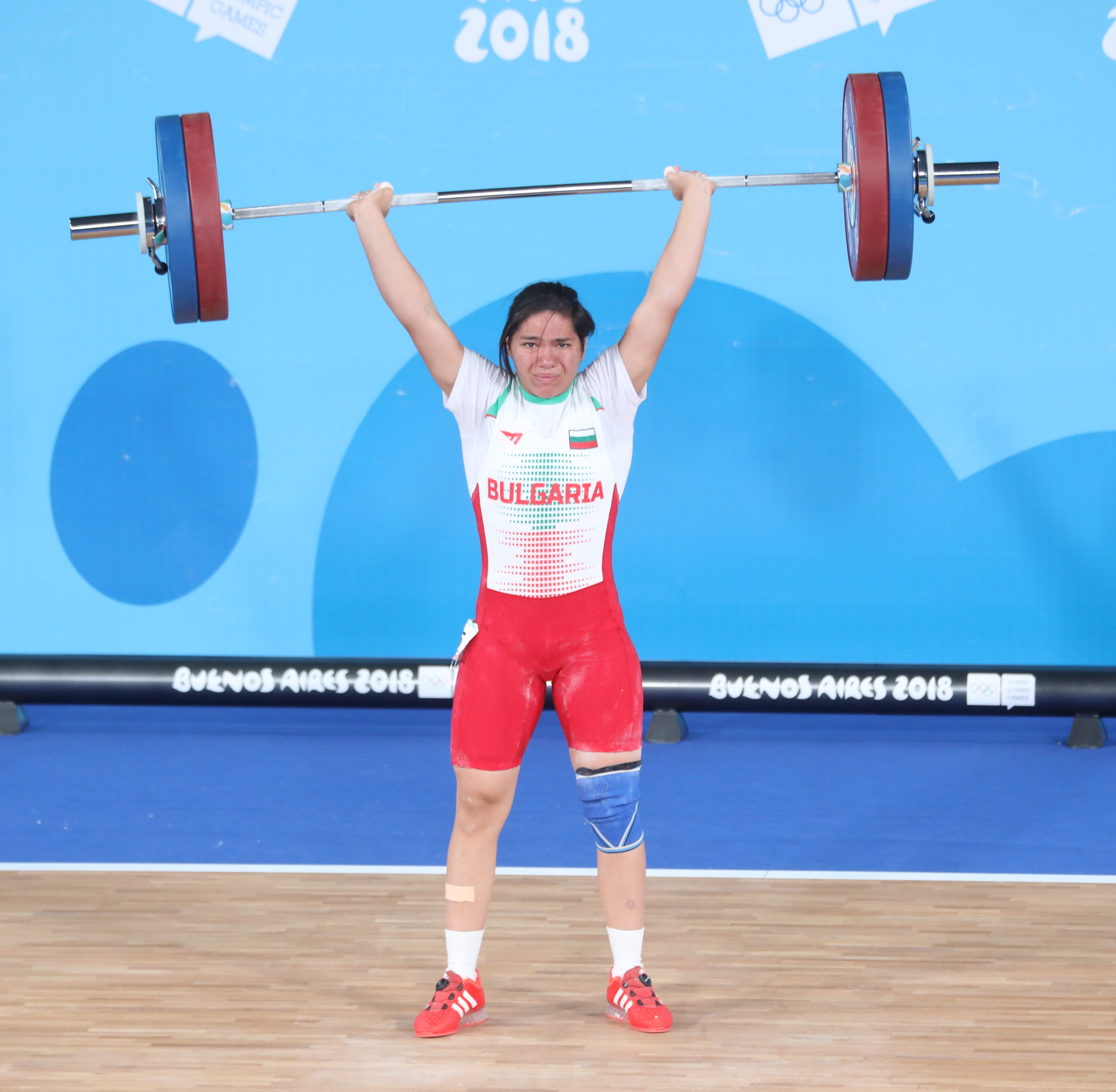
- Galya Shatova lifting 111 kg at the 2018 Summer Youth Olympics

Personal information
- Nationality: Bulgarian
- Born: 29 August 2001 (age 24)
- Weight: 63.54 kg (140.1 lb)

Sport
- Country: Bulgaria
- Sport: Weightlifting
- Weight class: 64 kg
- Club: Karlovo Sport Weightlifting Club
- Coached by: Ivan Luhov

Achievements and titles
- Personal bests: Snatch: 92 kg (2019); Clean and jerk: 111 kg (2019); Total: 203 kg (2019)
Medal record
Youth Olympic Games
Bronze medal – third place	2018 Buenos Aires	63 kg

Galya Anetova Shatova (Bulgarian: Галя Шатова; born 29 August 2001) is a Bulgarian weightlifter competing in the 63 kg category until 2018 and 64 kg starting in 2018 after the International Weightlifting Federation reorganized the categories.

== Career ==
In 2018, she competed in the 63 kg division at the European Weightlifting Championships. and, in that same year, she won the bronze medal at the Summer Youth Olympics in the 63 kg event.

== Major results ==
Year	Venue	Weight	Snatch (kg)				Clean & Jerk (kg)				Total	Rank
Year	Venue	Weight	1	2	3	Rank	1	2	3	Rank	Total	Rank
World Championships
2017	Anaheim, United States	63 kg	85	~~88~~	88	18	105	108	~~110~~	17	196	16
2022	Bogotá, Colombia	59 kg	85	88	~~90~~	26	105	~~107~~	~~107~~	32	193	29
European Championships
2018	Bucharest, Romania	63 kg	87	~~90~~	91	5	105	108	~~110~~	6	199	5
2019	Batumi, Georgia	64 kg	88	~~91~~	92	12	107	~~111~~	111	12	203	12
2024	Sofia, Bulgaria	64 kg	92	94	96	5	115	~~119~~	~~119~~	5	211	5
2025	Chișinău, Moldova	64 kg	92	~~95~~	~~97~~	13	116	119	~~122~~	8	211	7
Youth Olympic Games
2018	Buenos Aires, Argentina	63 kg	85	90	~~94~~	—N/a	102	106	111	—N/a	201	3rd place, bronze medalist(s)
