= Park Min-kyung =

South Korean weightlifter (born 1996)

Personal information
- Born: 16 December 1996 (age 29)

Sport
- Country: South Korea
- Sport: Weightlifting
- Weight class: 64 kg
Medal record
Women's weightlifting
Representing South Korea
World Championships
Bronze medal – third place	2021 Tashkent	64 kg
Bronze medal – third place	2023 Riyadh	64 kg
Asian Championships
Bronze medal – third place	2024 Tashkent	64 kg

Park Min-kyung (born 16 December 1996) is a South Korean weightlifter. She is a two-time bronze medalist in the women's 64 kg event at the World Weightlifting Championships.

She competed in the women's 64 kg event at the 2018 World Weightlifting Championships held in Ashgabat, Turkmenistan. She won the bronze medal in the women's 64 kg event at the 2021 World Weightlifting Championships held in Tashkent, Uzbekistan.

She won the bronze medal in the women's 64 kg event at the 2023 World Weightlifting Championships held in Riyadh, Saudi Arabia.
