= Joana Palacios =

Argentine weightlifter (born 1996)

Personal information
- Born: 8 November 1996 (age 29)
- Height: 1.6 m (5 ft 3 in)
- Weight: 63 kg (139 lb)

Sport
- Country: Argentina
- Sport: Weightlifting
- Event: Women's 63 kg

Joana Palacios (born 8 November 1996) is an Argentine weightlifter. She competed in the women's 63 kg event at the 2016 Summer Olympics.
