= Georgina Black =

Scottish weightlifter

Personal information
- Full name: Georgina Black
- Nationality: United Kingdom ( Scotland)
- Born: 20 December 1989 (age 36)
- Weight: 62.97 kg (138.8 lb)

Sport
- Country: Scotland
- Sport: Weightlifting
- Weight class: 63 kg
- Team: National team
- Updated on 19 October 2016

Georgina Black (born 20 December 1989) is a Scottish female weightlifter, competing in the 63 kg category. She represented Scotland at the 2014 Commonwealth Games in the 63 kg event. She also competed in the 2013 Commonwealth Championships, the 2013 10th International "ASVO-NO" Women's Grand Prix, and the 2011 Commonwealth Championships.

Black has dropping a number of bodyweight divisions, from 75 kg in 2011, to 69 kg in 2013 and 63 kg in 2014, necessitating considerable personal weight loss whilst maintaining her ability to lift.

== Major competitions ==
Year	Venue	Weight	Snatch (kg)				Clean & Jerk (kg)				Total	Rank
Year	Venue	Weight	1	2	3	Rank	1	2	3	Rank	Total	Rank
Commonwealth Games
2014	Glasgow, Scotland	63 kg	75	~~77~~	~~79~~	—N/a	94	98	100	—N/a	175	9
