= Arcangeline Fouodji =

Cameroonian weightlifter

Personal information
- Full name: Arcangeline Fouodji Sonkbou
- Born: 26 August 1987 (age 38) Douala, Cameroon
- Height: 1.58 m (5 ft 2 in)
- Weight: 68 kg (150 lb)

Sport
- Country: Cameroon
- Sport: Weightlifting
- Event: Women's 69 kg

Arcangeline Fouodji Sonkbou (born 26 August 1987) is a Cameroonian weightlifter. She participated at the 2014 Commonwealth Games in the 63 kg event. She competed in the women's 69 kg event at the 2016 Summer Olympics.

After competing in her second Commonwealth Games in 2018, she, along with numerous teammates from the Cameroonian team, defected from the team hotel and sought political asylum in Australia.

== Major competitions ==
Year	Venue	Weight	Snatch (kg)				Clean & Jerk (kg)				Total	Rank
Year	Venue	Weight	1	2	3	Rank	1	2	3	Rank	Total	Rank
Commonwealth Games
2014	Glasgow, Scotland	63 kg	70	75	77	—N/a	95	100	~~102~~	—N/a	177	8
2018	Gold Coast, Australia	69 kg	75	~~80~~	80	—N/a	95	100	~~102~~	—N/a	180	9
