= Emily Muskett =

British weightlifter (born 1989)

Emily Muskett (née Godley)
Personal information
- Born: Emily Victoria Godley; 22 October 1989 (age 36) Farnborough, United Kingdom
- Height: 1.62 m (5 ft 4 in)
- Weight: 70.65 kg (156 lb)

Sport
- Country: England; Great Britain
- Sport: Weightlifting
- Team: National team
- Coached by: Andrew Callard
Medal record
Women's weightlifting
Representing Great Britain
World Championships
Bronze medal – third place	2019 Pattaya	71 kg C&J
European Championships
Gold medal – first place	2021 Moscow	71 kg
Silver medal – second place	2019 Batumi	71 kg
Representing England
Commonwealth Games
Gold medal – first place	2018 Gold Coast	75 kg
Commonwealth Championships
Gold medal – first place	2019 Samoa	71 kg
- Updated on 24 January 2022

Emily Muskett (born Emily Godley 22 October 1989 in Farnborough) is a retired British weightlifter, competing in the 69, 71 and 75 kg categories and representing England and Great Britain at international competitions. She won a gold medal at the 2018 Commonwealth Games in the women 75 kg category, a gold at the 2019 Commonwealth Championships at 76 kg and a silver medal in the 71 kg category at the 2019 European Weightlifting Championships. She has competed in three world championships, including at the 2019 World Weightlifting Championships where she won her only global medal, a minor bronze medalist in the 'clean & jerk'.

Her coach is Andrew Callard. In August 2021, having finished 7th in the Olympic Games, Muskett announced her retirement, and transition to coaching.

== Major results ==
Year	Venue	Weight	Snatch (kg)				Clean & Jerk (kg)				Total	Rank
Year	Venue	Weight	1	2	3	Rank	1	2	3	Rank	Total	Rank
Representing Great Britain
Olympic Games
2021	Tokyo, Japan	76kg	92	95	98		117	123	~~124~~		222	7
World Championships
2019	Pattaya, Thailand	71 kg	94	97	100	4	124	126	~~131~~	3rd place, bronze medalist(s)	226	4
2015	Houston, United States	69 kg	90	~~93~~	~~94~~	32	114	~~118~~	~~119~~	25	204	29
2014	Almaty, Kazakhstan	63 kg	~~85~~	~~85~~	85	33	105	~~109~~	~~109~~	29	190	30
2013	Wrocław, Poland	63 kg	82	~~85~~	~~85~~	18	104	~~107~~	~~107~~	18	186	18
European Championships
2021	Moscow, Russia	71 kg	94	~~97~~	98	2nd place, silver medalist(s)	122	129	~~132~~	1st place, gold medalist(s)	227	1st place, gold medalist(s)
2019	(Georgia (country)) Batumi, Georgia	71 kg	~~93~~	93	~~96~~	5	117	~~120~~	123	2nd place, silver medalist(s)	216	2nd place, silver medalist(s)
2017	Split, Croatia	69 kg	87	90	92	10	112	~~117~~	117	7	209	8
2016	Førde, Norway	63 kg	89	~~92~~	~~93~~	8	110	~~114~~	~~114~~	7	199	6
2014	Tel Aviv, Israel	63 kg	85	~~88~~	88	12	104	~~108~~	~~108~~	10	192	10
Representing England
Commonwealth Games
2018	Gold Coast, Australia	75 kg	91	94	96	1	119	124	126	2	222	1st place, gold medalist(s)
2014	Glasgow, Scotland	63 kg	85	88	~~90~~	4	105	~~108~~	108	5	196	5
2010	Delhi, India	63 kg	~~72~~	~~72~~	~~72~~	—	—	—	—	—	—	—
Commonwealth Championships
2019	Apia, Samoa	76 kg	93	~~97~~	~~97~~	2	119	124	127	1	220	1st place, gold medalist(s)
