= Weightlifting at the 2014 Commonwealth Games – Women's 63 kg =

Weightlifting – Women's 63 kg at the 2014 Commonwealth Games
- Venue: Clyde Auditorium
- Dates: 27 July 2014
- Competitors: 15 from 11 nations
- Winning total weight: 207 kg

Medalists
gold medal	Olauwatoyin Adesanmi	Nigeria
silver medal	Obioma Okoli	Nigeria
bronze medal	Punam Yadav	India

The Women's 63 kg weightlifting event was the third lightest women's weightlifting event at the 2014 Commonwealth Games, limiting competitors to a maximum of 63 kilogrammes of body mass. The competition took place on 27 July at 16:00 at the Clyde Auditorium in Glasgow, Scotland. The weightlifter from Nigeria won the gold, with a combined lift of 207 kg.

== Result ==
Rank	Athlete	Snatch (kg)				Clean & Jerk (kg)				Total
Rank	Athlete	1	2	3	Result	1	2	3	Result	Total
1st place, gold medalist(s)	Olauwatoyin Adesanmi (NGR)	~~92~~	92	~~96~~	92	115	~~120~~	~~120~~	115	207*
2nd place, silver medalist(s)	Obioma Okoli (NGR)	90	~~90~~	~~90~~	90	111	117	~~123~~	117	207
3rd place, bronze medalist(s)	Punam Yadav (IND)	~~85~~	85	88	88	110	114	~~117~~	114	202
4	Vandna Gupta (IND)	87	89	91	91	107	~~110~~	~~110~~	107	198
5	Emily Godley (ENG)	85	88	~~90~~	88	105	~~108~~	108	108	196
6	Myriam Ghekap Wafo (CMR)	77	82	~~86~~	82	100	105	108	108	190
7	Sarah Davies (ENG)	~~83~~	~~83~~	83	83	~~105~~	105	~~110~~	105	188
8	Arcangeline Fouodji Sonkbou (CMR)	70	75	77	77	95	100	~~102~~	100	177
9	Georgina Black (SCO)	75	~~77~~	~~79~~	75	94	98	100	100	175
10	Hepline Iro (SOL)	~~73~~	73	77	77	~~95~~	95	97	97	174
11	Lauren Roberts (NZL)	79	~~81~~	~~81~~	79	88	~~91~~	91	91	170
12	Alexandra Klatsia (CYP)	71	~~74~~	~~74~~	71	~~90~~	~~90~~	90	90	161
13	Stephanie Owens (WAL)	67	~~72~~	~~73~~	67	~~87~~	~~87~~	87	87	154
-	Julia Timi (FIJ)	70	~~73~~	~~73~~	70	~~90~~	~~90~~	~~90~~	—N/a	DNF
-	Mona Pretorius (RSA)	~~82~~	~~82~~	82	82	—N/a				DNF

* Winner determined on account of having less body weight
