= Weightlifting at the 2010 Commonwealth Games – Women's 63 kg =

The women's 63 kg weightlifting event was an event at the weightlifting competition, limiting competitors to a maximum of 63 kilograms of body mass. The competition took place on 7 October. The weightlifter from Nigeria won the gold, with a combined lift of 211 kg.

== Results ==
Rank	Name	Country	B.weight (kg)	Snatch (kg)	Clean & Jerk (kg)	Total (kg)
1st place, gold medalist(s)	Obioma Okoli	Nigeria	62.46	90	121	211
2nd place, silver medalist(s)	Michaela Breeze	Wales	61.68	92	110	202
3rd place, bronze medalist(s)	Marie Fegue	Cameroon	62.83	89	109	198
4	Nurul Johari	Malaysia	62.72	90	105	195
5	Faitoa Togagae	Samoa	61.87	76	100	176
6	Jenlyn Wini Tegu	Solomon Islands	60.40	70	95	165
7	Urima Tyrell	Samoa	62.49	63	85	148
–	Emily Godley	England	62.19	–	–	DNF

== See also ==
- 2010 Commonwealth Games
- Weightlifting at the 2010 Commonwealth Games
