= Takenibeia Toromon =

Kiribati weightlifter

Personal information
- Full name: Takenibeia Toromon
- Born: 29 January 1992 (age 34)
- Weight: 68.15 kg (150.2 lb)

Sport
- Country: Kiribati
- Sport: Weightlifting
- Weight class: 69 kg
- Team: National team
- Updated on 11 October 2016

Takenibeia Toromon (born 29 January 1992) is an I-Kiribati male weightlifter, competing in the 69 kg category and representing Kiribati at international competitions. He participated at the 2010 Commonwealth Games in the 69 kg event. He is the holder of Kiribati records in Olympic weightlifting. He won the bronze medal at the 2011 Pacific Games, and silver at the 2013 Commonwealth Weightlifting Championships.

== Major competitions ==
Year	Venue	Weight	Snatch (kg)				Clean & Jerk (kg)				Total	Rank
Year	Venue	Weight	1	2	3	Rank	1	2	3	Rank	Total	Rank
Commonwealth Games
2010	Delhi, India	69 kg	110	~~115~~	~~115~~	—N/a	135	~~140~~	~~145~~	—N/a	245	11
2014	Glasgow, Scotland	69 kg	110	115	~~120~~	—N/a	140	145	~~150~~	—N/a	260	11
Pacific Games
2011	Nouméa, New Caledonia	77 kg	?	?	?	---	?	?	?	---	269	3rd place, bronze medalist(s)
