= Kumushkhon Fayzullaeva =

Uzbekistani weightlifter (born 2002)

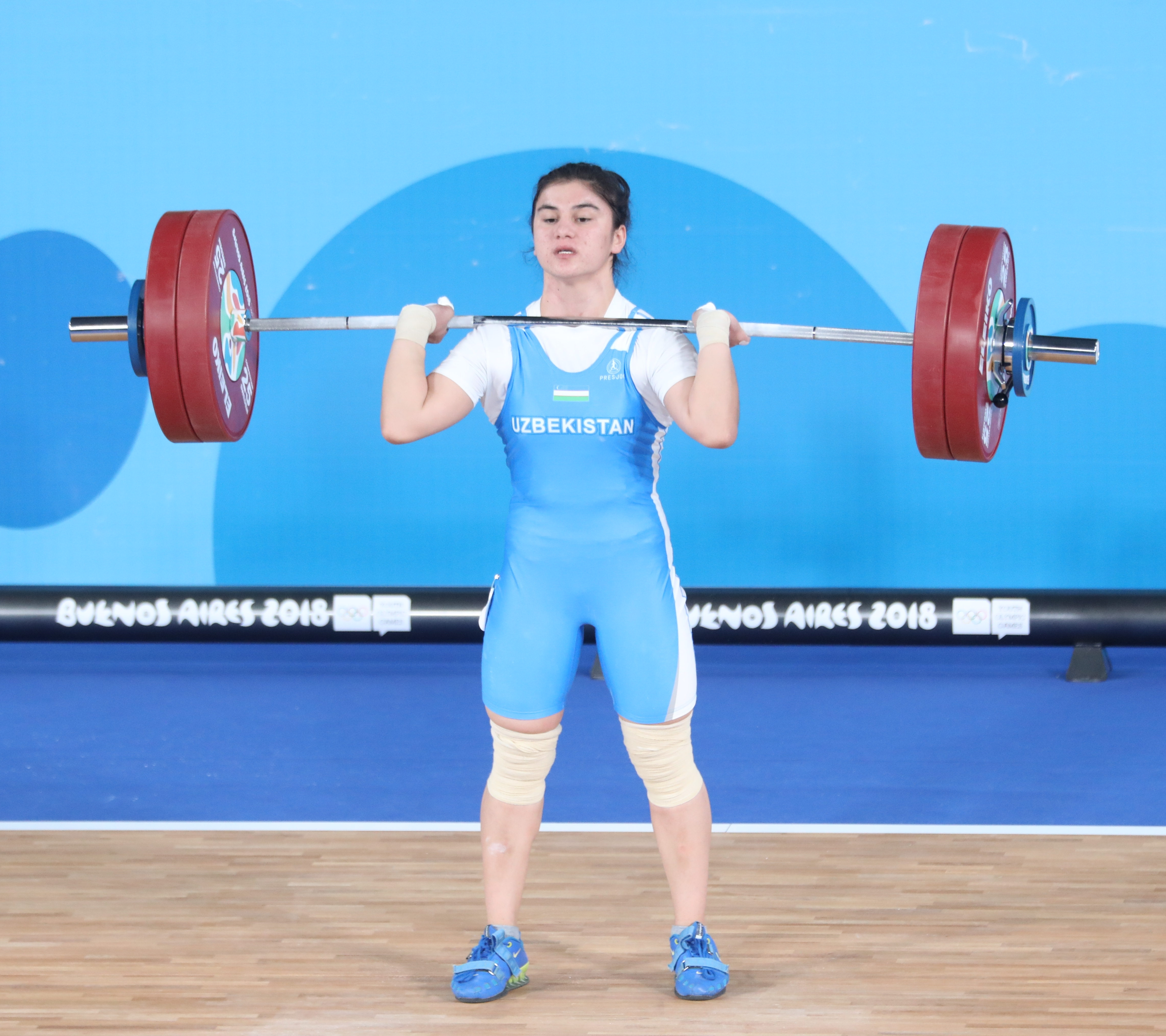
- Kumushkhon Fayzullaeva in 2018

Personal information
- Born: 20 January 2002 (age 24) Nawoiy, Uzbekistan

Sport
- Country: Uzbekistan
- Sport: Weightlifting
Medal record
Women's weightlifting
Representing Uzbekistan
Summer Youth Olympics
Gold medal – first place	2018 Buenos Aires	63 kg
Junior World Championships
Gold medal – first place	2018 Tashkent	63 kg
Silver medal – second place	2021 Tashkent	71 kg
Youth World Championships
Gold medal – first place	2019 Las Vegas	64 kg
Bronze medal – third place	2017 Bangkok	58 kg
Islamic Solidarity Games
Silver medal – second place	2017 Baku	63 kg

Kumushkhon Fayzullaeva (born 20 January 2002) is an Uzbekistani weightlifter. She won the gold medal in the girls' 63 kg event at the 2018 Summer Youth Olympics held in Buenos Aires, Argentina.

== Career ==
Fayzullaeva won the bronze medal in the women's 58 kg event at the 2017 Youth World Weightlifting Championships held in Bangkok, Thailand. At the 2017 Islamic Solidarity Games held in Baku, Azerbaijan, she won the silver medal in the women's 63 kg event.

In 2018, Fayzullaeva won the gold medal in the women's 63 kg event at the Junior World Weightlifting Championships held in Tashkent, Uzbekistan. In that same year, she competed in the 64 kg event at the 2018 World Weightlifting Championships and in 2019, she also competed in the 64 kg event, in both cases without winning a medal. In 2018, she finished in 21st place and in 2019, she improved her result with a finish in 10th place.

Fayzullaeva won the gold medal in the women's 64 kg event at the 2019 Youth World Weightlifting Championships held in Las Vegas, United States. She also won the bronze medal in the women's 64 kg Snatch event at the 6th International Qatar Cup held in Doha, Qatar. In 2021, Fayzullaeva won the silver medal in the women's 71 kg event at the Junior World Weightlifting Championships held in Tashkent, Uzbekistan.

Fayzullaeva represented Uzbekistan at the 2020 Summer Olympics in Tokyo, Japan. She finished in 6th place in the women's 76 kg event. A few months later, she competed in the women's 71 kg event at the 2021 World Weightlifting Championships held in Tashkent, Uzbekistan.

== Achievements ==
Year	Venue	Weight	Snatch (kg)				Clean & Jerk (kg)				Total	Rank
Year	Venue	Weight	1	2	3	Rank	1	2	3	Rank	Total	Rank
Summer Olympics
2021	Tokyo, Japan	76 kg	97	~~101~~	101	—N/a	122	126	~~130~~	—N/a	227	6
