= Weightlifting at the 2018 Summer Youth Olympics – Girls' 63 kg =

Girls' 63 kg at the III Summer Youth Olympic Games
- Venue: Parque Polideportivo Roca
- Dates: October 12
- Competitors: 11 from 11 nations

Medalists
1st place, gold medalist(s)		Kumushkhon Fayzullaeva	Uzbekistan
2nd place, silver medalist(s)		Thipwara Chontavin	Thailand
3rd place, bronze medalist(s)		Galya Shatova	Bulgaria

These are the results for the girls' 63 kg event at the 2018 Summer Youth Olympics.

== Results ==
Rank	Name	Nation	Body Weight	Snatch (kg)				Clean & Jerk (kg)				Total (kg)
Rank	Name	Nation	Body Weight	1	2	3	Res	1	2	3	Res	Total (kg)
1st place, gold medalist(s)	Kumushkhon Fayzullaeva	Uzbekistan		90	~~94~~	94	94	113	117	124	124	218
2nd place, silver medalist(s)	Thipwara Chontavin	Thailand		85	88	~~91~~	88	108	114	~~124~~	114	202
3rd place, bronze medalist(s)	Galya Shatova	Bulgaria		85	90	~~94~~	90	102	106	111	111	201
4	Maria Luz Casadevall	Argentina		81	85	~~88~~	85	~~101~~	101	105	105	190
5	Paulina Rutkowska	Poland		81	84	~~86~~	84	100	103	~~107~~	103	187
6	Maximina Uepa	Nauru		77	80	82	82	95	~~101~~	101	101	183
7	Ketty Lent	Mauritius		70	75	~~79~~	75	92	98	~~102~~	98	173
8	Sumire Hashimoto	Japan		65	70	75	75	85	91	95	95	170
9	Yerika Ríos	Chile		~~63~~	63	66	66	75	~~80~~	80	80	146
10	Shelby Mangion Vassallo	Malta		59	62	~~64~~	62	72	76	~~80~~	76	138
	Song Kuk-hyang	North Korea		~~100~~	~~100~~	~~100~~	—					DNF

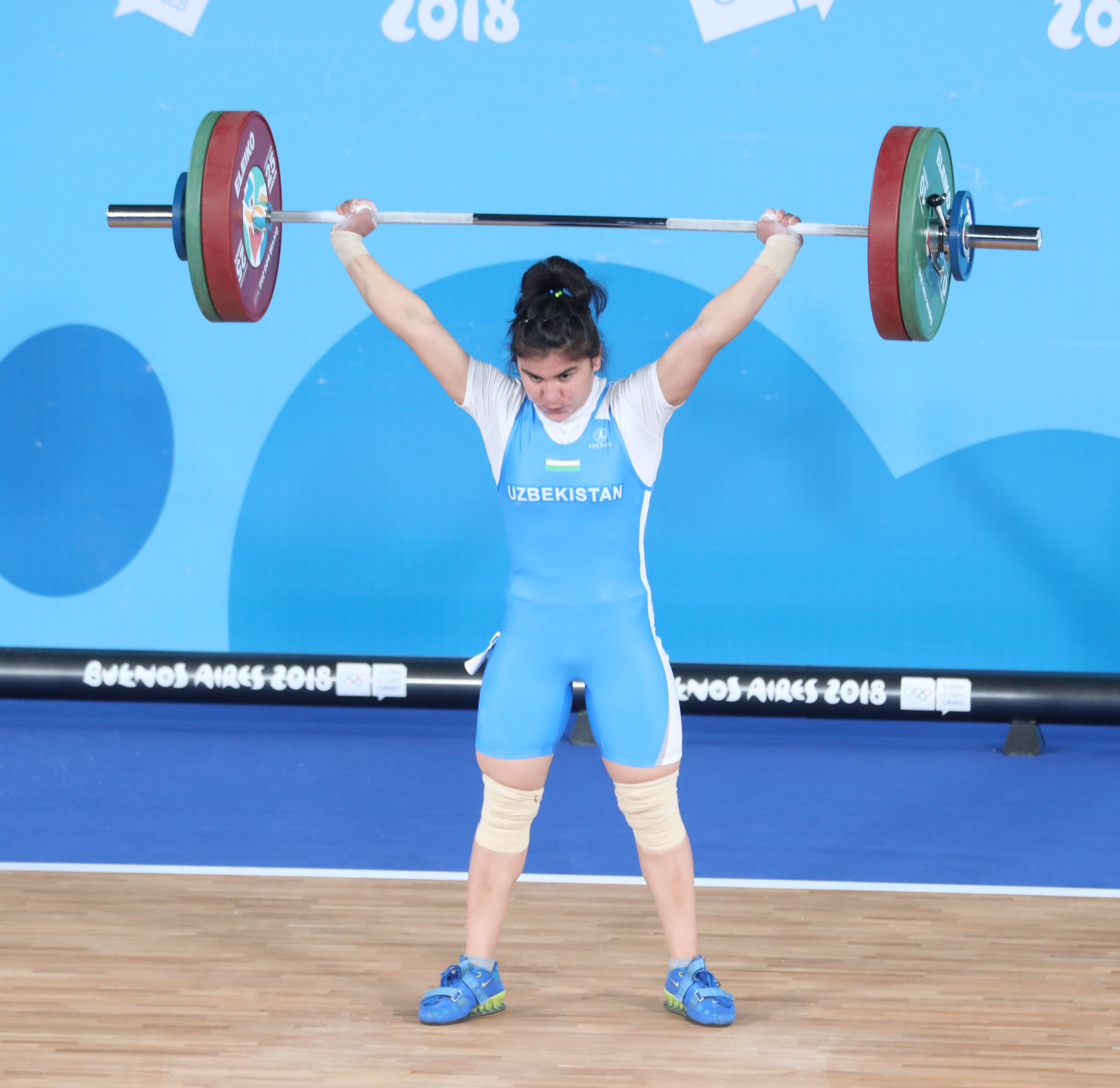
Kumushkhon Fayzullaeva

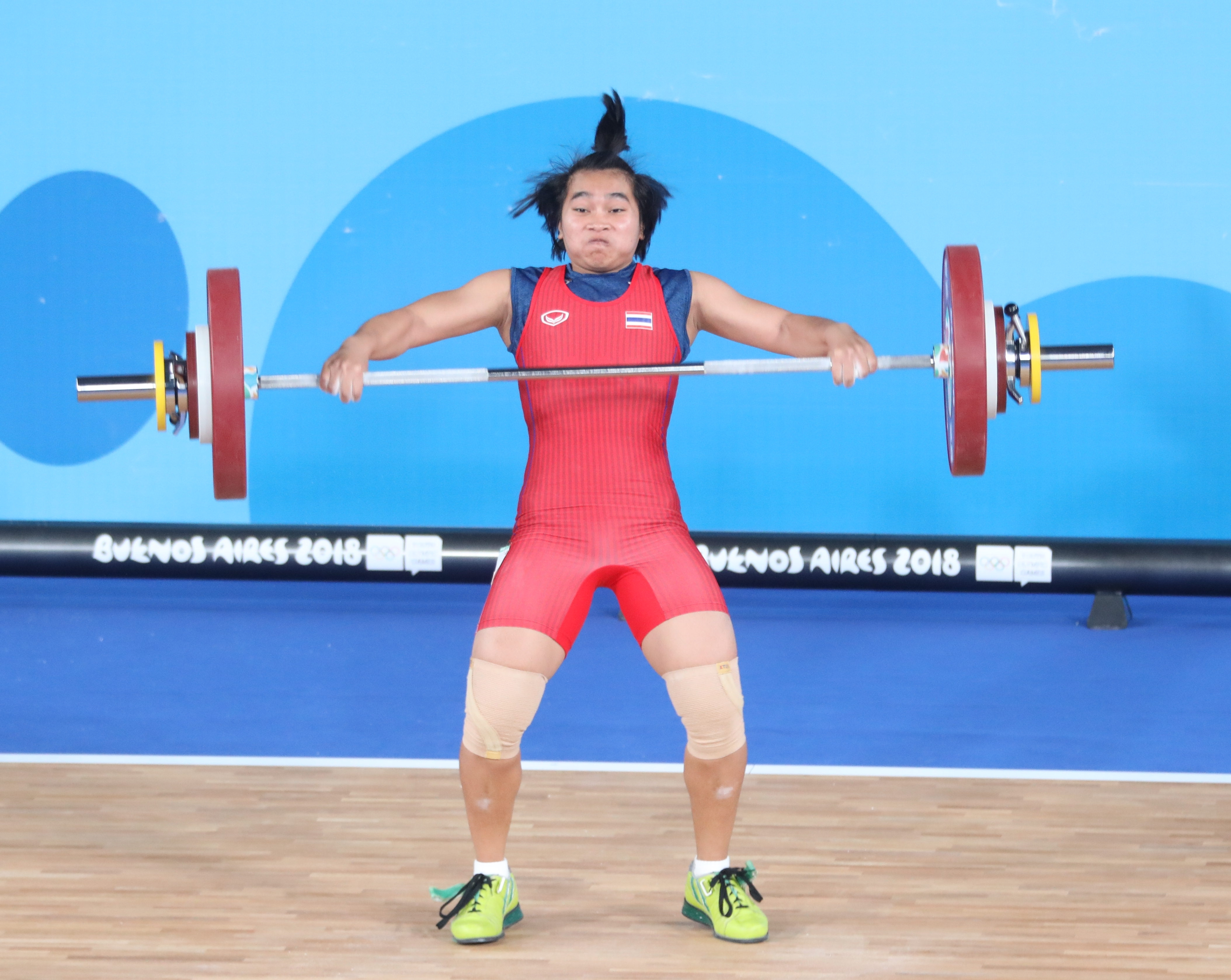
Thipwara Chontavin

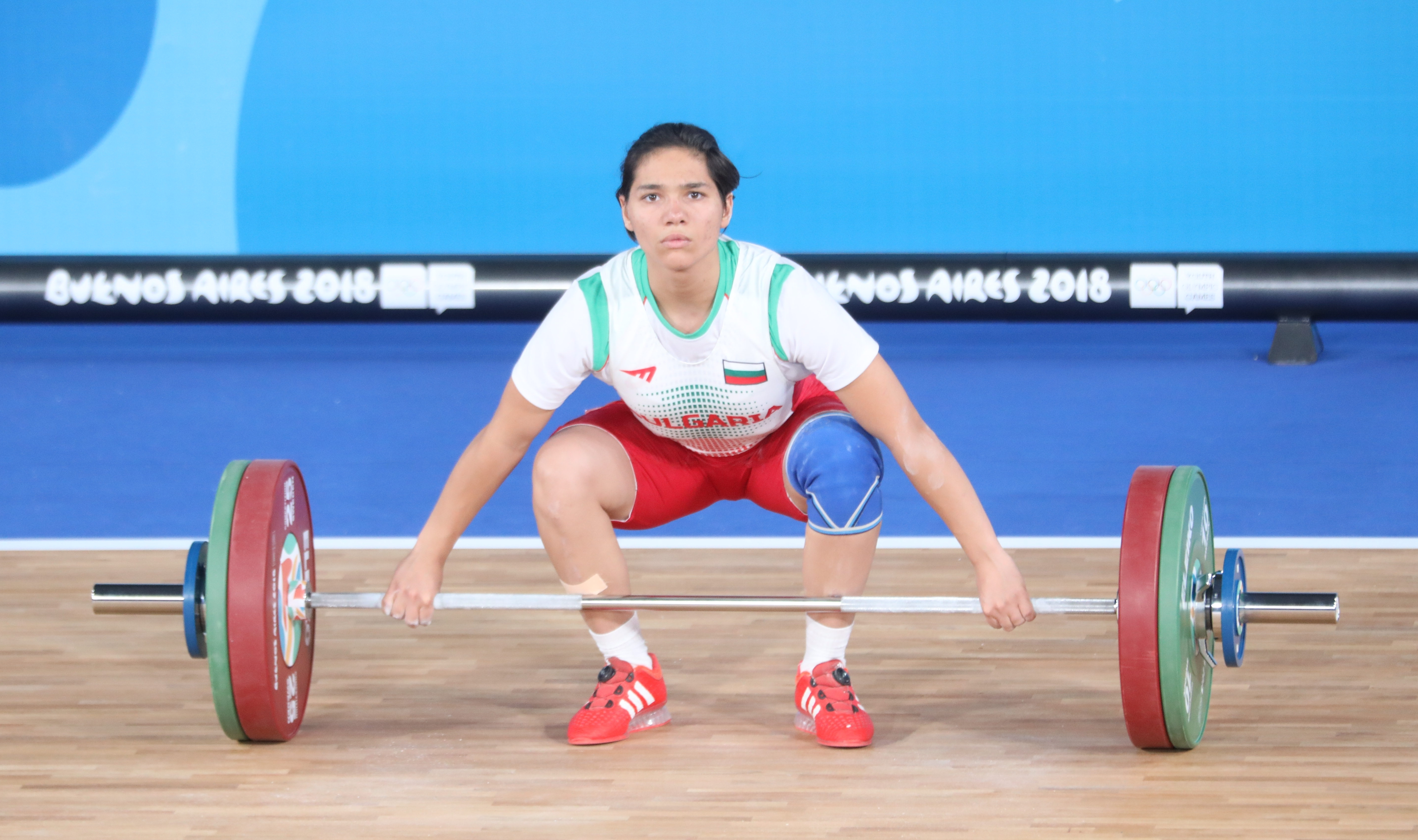
Galya Shatova

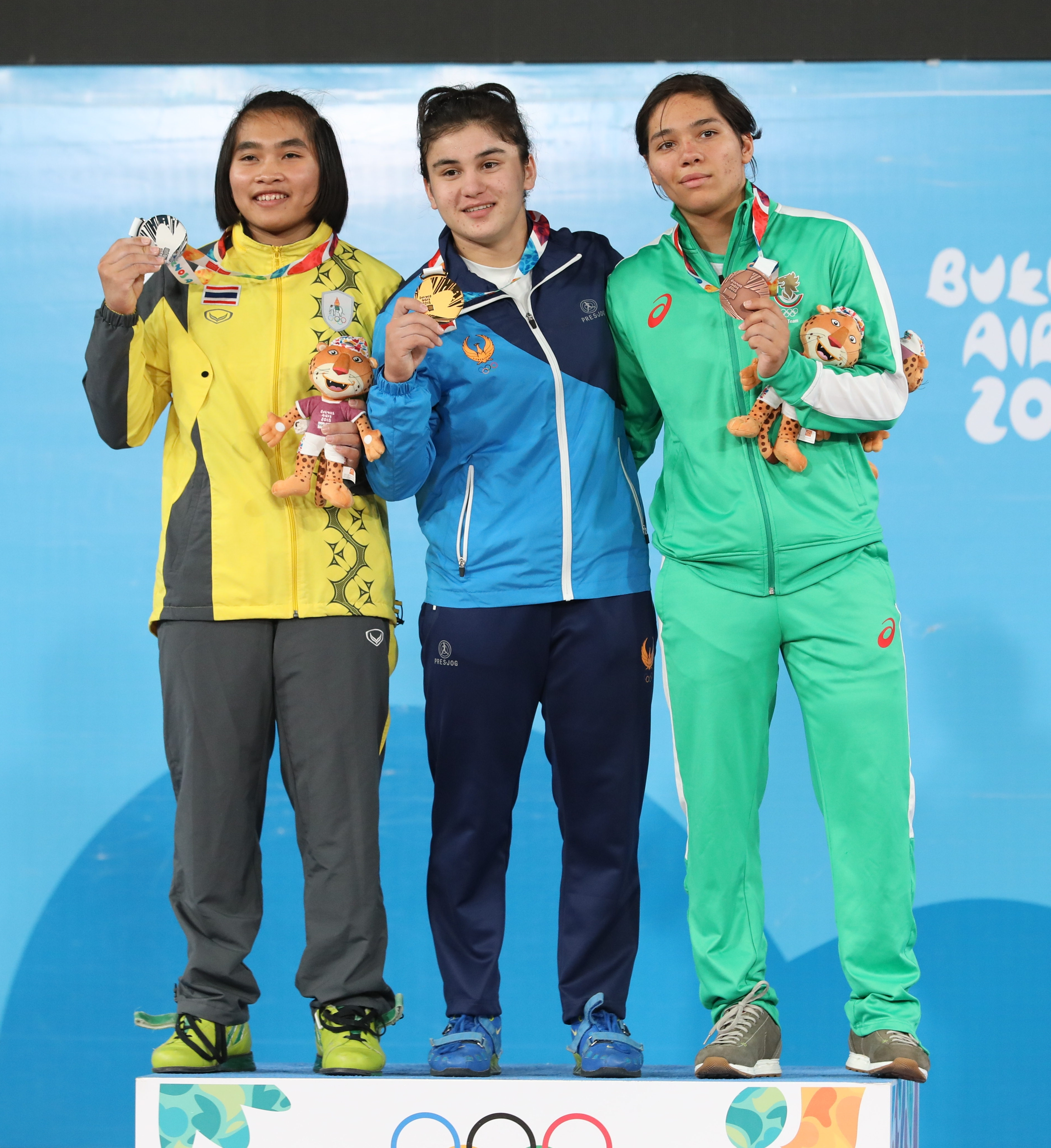
Victory ceremony
