= Hung Wan-ting =

Taiwanese weightlifter (born 1990)

Personal information
- Native name: 洪萬庭
- Born: 21 June 1990 (age 36)
- Education: National Taiwan Sport University

Sport
- Country: Chinese Taipei
- Sport: Weightlifting
Medal record
Women's weightlifting
Representing Chinese Taipei
Asian Games
Silver medal – second place	2018 Jakarta–Palembang	69 kg
Summer Universiade
Gold medal – first place	2017 Taipei	69 kg
Silver medal – second place	2013 Kazan	69 kg
Asian Weightlifting Championships
Silver medal – second place	2016 Tashkent	69 kg
Bronze medal – third place	2017 Ashgabat	69 kg

Hung Wan-ting (born 21 June 1990) is a Taiwanese weightlifter. She won the silver medal in the women's 69 kg event at the 2018 Asian Games held in Jakarta, Indonesia.

== Early life ==
Hung is a native of Beinan, Taitung, and attended National Taiwan Sport University.

== Career ==
At the 2013 Summer Universiade in Kazan, Russia, she won the silver medal in the women's 69 kg event. In 2014, she competed in the women's 69 kg event at the 2014 Asian Games held in Incheon, South Korea without winning a medal. She finished in 6th place.

In 2016, she won the silver medal in the women's 69 kg event at the 2016 Asian Weightlifting Championships held in Tashkent, Uzbekistan.

In 2017, she won the bronze medal in the women's 69 kg event at the 2017 Asian Weightlifting Championships held in Ashgabat, Turkmenistan. Later that year, she won the gold medal in the women's 69 kg event at the 2017 Summer Universiade held in Taipei, Taiwan. In that same year, she also competed in the women's 69 kg event at the 2017 World Weightlifting Championships in Anaheim, United States without winning a medal; she finished in sixth place. This became fifth place after Romela Begaj of Albania tested positive for a banned substance.
