= Yasmin Zammit Stevens =

Maltese weightlifter

Personal information
- Nationality: Maltese
- Born: 21 April 1993 (age 33)
- Height: 161cm [5ft 3in]

Sport
- Sport: Weightlifting
Medal record
Women's weightlifting
Representing Malta
Commonwealth Championships
| Bronze medal – third place | 2021 Tashkent | 64 kg |

Yasmin Zammit Stevens is a Maltese weightlifter.

She competed at the 2018 European Small Nations Weightlifting Tournament. She represented Malta at the 2020 Summer Olympics in women's 64 kg event. She also competed in the women's 64 kg at the 2021 World Weightlifting Championships held in Tashkent, Uzbekistan. In October 2021, she participated in the Queen's Baton Relay ahead of the 2022 Commonwealth Games.

In December 2022, she was elected as member of the IWF Athletes' Commission.
