= Jo Pok-hyang =

North Korean weightlifter (born 1992)

Medal record

Women's weightlifting

Representing North Korea

World Championships
Silver medal – second place	2013 Wrocław	−63 kg

Asian Games
Bronze medal – third place	2014 Incheon	−63 kg

Asian Championships
Silver medal – second place	2013 Astana	−63 kg

- Jo Pok-hyang
- Hangul: 조복향
- RR: Jo Bokhyang
- MR: Cho Pokhyang

Jo Pok-Hyang (Korean: 조복향; born 15 November 1992) is a North Korean weightlifter. She competed at the 2013 World Championships in the Women's 63 kg, winning the Silver medal. Jo represents the Kigwancha Sports Team.
