= Punam Yadav =

Indian weightlifter (born 1995)

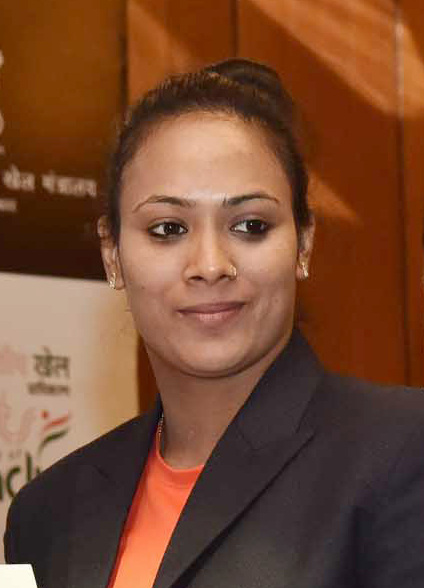
- Punam Yadav in 2018

Personal information
- Native name: पूनम यादव
- Nationality: Indian
- Born: 25 July 1995 (age 31) Varanasi, Uttar Pradesh, India

Sport
- Country: India
- Sport: Weightlifting
- Event: 63 kg
- University team: Kashi Vidyapeeth, Varanasi
Medal record
Women's weightlifting
Representing India
Commonwealth Games
Gold medal – first place	2018 Gold Coast	69 kg
Bronze medal – third place	2014 Glasgow	63 kg
Commonwealth Championships
Gold medal – first place	2015 Pune	63 kg
Silver medal – second place	2017 Gold Coast	69 kg
Silver medal – second place	2021 Tashkent	76 kg
- Updated on 16 January 2022

Punam Yadav (born 9 July 1995) is an Indian weightlifter who won bronze medal in the women's 63 kg weight class at the 2014 Commonwealth Games at Glasgow, where the gold medal was won by Olauwatoyin Adesanmi of Nigeria. She also won a gold medal at the 2018 Commonwealth Games held in Gold Coast, Australia.

== Early life ==
The daughter of a small farmer, Punam grew up helping her parents in a Benaras village. After three years of intense training to become an international weightlifter, Punam finally got a chance to represent India at the 2014 Commonwealth Games. Her father reportedly sold their family buffalo to fund Punam's trip.

She also joined Bhu Kashi Vidhya Peeth for her under graduate courses.

== Yash Bharti Award ==
Punam was given Yash Bharati award by Government of Uttar Pradesh in 2015 for weightlifting.

== Career ==
She won the gold medal by lifting a total of 222 kg: 100 kg in Snatch and 122 kg in Clean and jerk in 2018 Commonwealth Games in women's 69 kg division.

She had won bronze medal in 2014 Commonwealth Games by lifting a total weight of 202 kg, 88 kg in snatch and 114 kg in Clean and jerk. She went for undergraduate course at varanasi kashi vidhya peeth.
