= Vandna Gupta =

Indian weightlifter (born 1994)

Personal information
- Nationality: Indian
- Born: 17 December 1994 (age 31) Lucknow, India
- Height: 1.65 m (5 ft 5 in) (2014)
- Weight: 63 kg (139 lb) (2014)

Sport
- Country: India
- Sport: Weightlifting
- Event: 63 kg
Medal record
Women's weightlifting
Representing India
Commonwealth Championships
Bronze medal – third place	2013 Penang	63 kg
Bronze medal – third place	2017 Gold Coast	63 kg

Vandna Gupta (born 17 December 1994) is an Indian weightlifter who placed fourth in the women's 63 kg weight class at the 2014 Commonwealth Games at Glasgow. Vandana Gupta is from Lucknow and married Sandeep Tomar on 28 February 2017.
