= Weightlifting at the 2018 Commonwealth Games – Women's 69 kg =

Weightlifting – Women's 69 kg at the 2018 Commonwealth Games
- Venue: Carrara Sports and Leisure Centre
- Dates: 8 April 2018
- Competitors: 13 from 13 nations
- Winning total weight: 222

Medalists
gold medal	Punam Yadav	India
silver medal	Sarah Davies	England
bronze medal	Apolonia Vaivai	Fiji

The Women's 69 kg weightlifting event at the 2018 Commonwealth Games took place at the Carrara Sports and Leisure Centre on 8 April 2018. The weightlifter from India won the gold, with a combined lift of 222 kg.

== Records ==
Prior to this competition, the existing world, Commonwealth and Games records were as follows:

World record	Snatch	Oxana Slivenko (RUS)	123 kg	Santo Domingo, Dominican	4 October 2006
World record	Clean & Jerk	Zarema Kasayeva (RUS)	157 kg	Doha, Qatar	13 November 2005
World record	Total	Oxana Slivenko (RUS)	276 kg	Chiang Mai, Thailand	24 September 2007
Commonwealth record	Snatch	Karnam Malleswari (IND)	110 kg	Sydney, Australia	19 September 2000
Commonwealth record	Clean & Jerk	Jeane Lassen (CAN)	136 kg	Santo Domingo, Dominican	4 October 2006
Commonwealth record	Total	Karnam Malleswari (IND)	240 kg	Sydney, Australia	19 September 2000
Games record	Snatch	Christine Girard (CAN)	105 kg	New Delhi, India	8 October 2010
Games record	Clean & Jerk	Jeane Lassen (CAN)	132 kg	Melbourne, Australia	20 March 2006
Games record	Total	Christine Girard (CAN)	235 kg	New Delhi, India	8 October 2010

== Schedule ==
All times are Australian Eastern Standard Time (UTC+10)

Date	Time	Round
Saturday, 8 April 2018	09:42	Final

== Results ==
Rank	Athlete	Body weight (kg)	Snatch (kg)				Clean & Jerk (kg)				Total
Rank	Athlete	Body weight (kg)	1	2	3	Result	1	2	3	Result	Total
1st place, gold medalist(s)	Punam Yadav (IND)	68.97	95	98	100	100	118	~~122~~	122	122	222
2nd place, silver medalist(s)	Sarah Davies (ENG)	68.43	92	~~95~~	95	95	119	122	~~128~~	122	217
3rd place, bronze medalist(s)	Apolonia Vaivai (FIJ)	68.90	97	100	~~103~~	100	~~115~~	116	~~122~~	116	216
4	Andreanne Messier (CAN)	68.97	89	92	95	95	112	116	~~122~~	116	211
5	Pip Malone (AUS)	66.28	92	95	~~98~~	95	114	~~117~~	~~117~~	114	209
6	Andrea Hams (NZL)	67.90	~~92~~	92	95	95	109	~~114~~	~~115~~	109	204
7	Celestie Engelbrecht (RSA)	63.94	83	~~87~~	~~90~~	83	102	106	110	110	193
8	Emanuella Labonne (MRI)	68.58	80	85	~~90~~	85	~~100~~	100	~~108~~	100	185
9	Arcangeline Fouodji (CMR)	68.81	75	~~80~~	80	80	95	100	~~102~~	100	180
10	Faye Pittman (WAL)	68.62	~~78~~	~~78~~	78	78	95	~~100~~	100	100	178
11	Tiiau Bakaekiri (KIR)	67.80	70	~~73~~	73	73	90	95	~~100~~	95	168
12	Rebekah Thompson (NIR)	67.63	67	~~70~~	~~72~~	67	~~87~~	88	91	91	158
13	Daniel Ricci (NRU)	68.64	63	~~68~~	~~68~~	63	80	~~84~~	84	84	147
