= Tima Turieva =

Russian weightlifter (born 1992)

Medal record

Representing Russia

Women's Weightlifting

World Championships
Gold medal – first place	2013 Wrocław	–63 kg
Silver medal – second place	2014 Almaty	–63 kg
Silver medal – second place	2015 Houston	–63 kg

European Championships
Bronze medal – third place	2017 Split	–63 kg

Summer Universiade
Silver medal – second place	2017 Taipei	–63 kg

Tima Budzievna Turieva (Russian: Ти́ма Будзи́евна Тури́ева; born 22 June 1992) is a Russian weightlifter. She competed at the 2013 World Championships in the Women's 63 kg, winning the gold medal.
