= Obioma Okoli =

Nigerian weightlifter (born 1992)

Personal information
- Nationality: Nigerian
- Born: 3 June 1992 (age 34) Lagos, Nigeria
- Weight: 63 kg (139 lb)

Sport
- Sport: Weightlifting
- Event: 63 kg
Medal record
Representing Nigeria
Women's weightlifting
Commonwealth Games
Gold medal – first place	2010 Delhi	Women's 63 kg
Silver medal – second place	2014 Glasgow	Women's 63 kg
- Updated on 11 October 2014

Obioma Okoli (born 3 June 1992) is a Nigerian weightlifter. She competed in the women's 63 kg event at the 2014 Commonwealth Games where she won a silver medal.
