= Manuel Suárez Memorial International Tournament =

- Location: Havana, Cuba
- Organised by: Cuban Weightlifting Federation (CWF)

The Manuel Suárez Memorial International Tournament (in Spanish: Torneo International "Manuel Suárez in Memoriam") is an annual Olympic Weightlifting competition held in Havana, Cuba. In 2022, the 40th iteration hosted 19 countries and more than 130 competitors.
