= Mahassen Fattouh =

Lebanese weightlifter (born 1989)

Mahassen Hala Fattouh
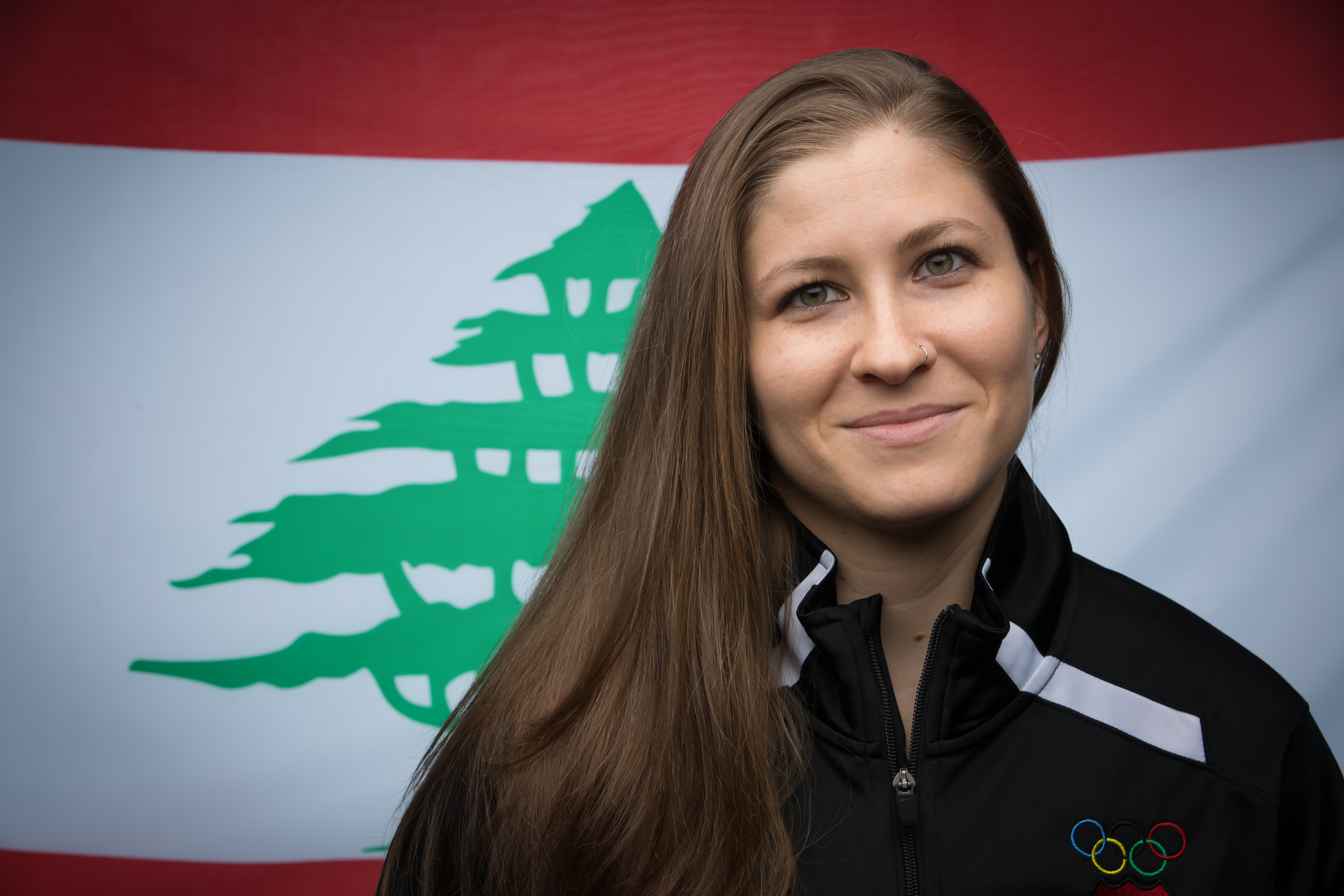

Personal information
- Native name: محاسن هالة مُحَمَّد فتوح
- Full name: Mahassen Hala Mohammed Fattouh
- National team: Lebanon
- Citizenship: Lebanese / American
- Born: 27 August 1989 (age 36) Melbourne, Florida
- Years active: 2005–present
- Height: 167 cm (5 ft 6 in)
- Weight: 69.6 kg (153 lb)
- Spouse: Ryan Paiva (2010–present)
- Parents: Mohammed Fattouh (father); Susan Fattouh (mother)
- Website: mahassenhala.com

Sport
- Country: Lebanon
- Sport: Weightlifting
- Weight class: 64 kg / 71 kg / 76 kg
- Coached by: Rayford Jones / Ryan Paiva

Achievements and titles
- Olympic finals: 9th
- World finals: 10th
- Regional finals: 1st
- Personal best(s): Snatch: 96 kg (212 lb); Clean & Jerk: 124 kg (273 lb); Total: 218 kg (481 lb)

Mahassen Hala Fattouh (born 27 August 1989) is a Lebanese Olympic weightlifter. She represented Lebanon at the 2020 Summer Olympics in Tokyo, Japan. She competed in the women's 76 kg event, finishing 9th overall. She holds 9 Lebanese national records across the 64 kg, 71 kg, and 76 kg weight classes and has earned 14 IWF international medals.

In 2014, Fattouh became the first woman to represent Lebanon internationally in weightlifting, competing in the women's 63 kg event at the World Weightlifting Championships in Almaty, Kazakhstan. In 2018, she earned the first women's IWF international medal for Lebanon in the women's 63 kg event at the 2018 Mediterranean Games held in Tarragona, Spain. In 2019, she became the first female Arab Champion at the Arab Championship held in Amman, Jordan. In 2024, Fattouh earned the first medal ever for Lebanese women's weightlifting at an Asian Championships event by achieving bronze in the clean and jerk at the 2024 Asian Championships held in Tashkent, Uzbekistan.

== Major results ==
Year	Venue	Weight	Snatch (kg)				Clean & Jerk (kg)				Total	Rank
Year	Venue	Weight	1	2	3	Rank	1	2	3	Rank	Total	Rank
Olympic Games
2020 (held in 2021)	Tokyo, Japan	76 kg	88	93	~~97~~	9	112	118	124	7	217	9
Mediterranean Games
2018	Tarragona, Spain	63 kg	~~89~~	~~89~~	~~92~~	-	~~116~~	~~116~~	117	2nd place, silver medalist(s)	-	-
Asian Championships
2024	Tashkent, Uzbekistan	76 kg	92	~~95~~	96	5	112	~~118~~	122	3rd place, bronze medalist(s)	218	4
2023	Jinju, South Korea	71 kg	86	90	94	10	105	110	115	10	209	10
IWF International Solidarity Championships
2018	Cairo, Egypt	64 kg	86	89	92	2nd place, silver medalist(s)	109	113	~~116~~	3rd place, bronze medalist(s)	205	2nd place, silver medalist(s)
IWF Arab Championships
2019	Amman, Jordan	71 kg	88	91	~~92~~	1st place, gold medalist(s)	113	~~117~~	~~117~~	1st place, gold medalist(s)	204	1st place, gold medalist(s)
2018	Cairo, Egypt	64 kg	86	89	92	2nd place, silver medalist(s)	109	113	~~116~~	2nd place, silver medalist(s)	205	2nd place, silver medalist(s)
Manuel Suárez Memorial International Tournament
2020	Havana, Cuba	64 kg	89	92	95	1st place, gold medalist(s)	~~116~~	~~116~~	117	2nd place, silver medalist(s)	212	2nd place, silver medalist(s)
