= Olauwatoyin Adesanmi =

Nigerian weightlifter (born 1992)

Personal information
- Full name: Oluwatoyin Victoria Adesanmi
- Nationality: Nigerian
- Born: 10 April 1992 (age 34) Lagos, Nigeria
- Height: 1.47 m (4 ft 10 in)
- Weight: 62 kg (137 lb)

Sport
- Sport: Weightlifting
- Event: 63 kg
Medal record
Representing Nigeria
Women's weightlifting
Commonwealth Games
Gold medal – first place	2014 Glasgow	Women's 63 kg
- Updated on 11 October 2014

Oluwatoyin Victoria Adesanmi (born 10 April 1992) is a Nigerian weightlifter. She competed in the women's 63 kg event at the 2014 Commonwealth Games where she won a gold medal. She won the gold medal at the 2015 African Games.

== Major results ==
Year	Venue	Weight	Snatch (kg)				Clean & Jerk (kg)				Total	Rank
Year	Venue	Weight	1	2	3	Rank	1	2	3	Rank	Total	Rank
African Games
2015	(Republic of the Congo) Brazzaville, Congo	63 kg	~~95~~	95	~~97~~	2nd place, silver medalist(s)	111	114	116	1st place, gold medalist(s)	211	1st place, gold medalist(s)
