= Namika Matsumoto =

Japanese weightlifter

Personal information
- Born: 7 February 1992 (age 34)
- Height: 1.58 m (5 ft 2 in)
- Weight: 63 kg (139 lb)

Sport
- Country: Japan
- Sport: Weightlifting
- Event: Women's 63 kg

Namika Matsumoto (松本 潮霞, Matsumoto Namika; born 7 February 1992) is a Japanese weightlifter. She equalled the Japanese weightlifting record for her class. She is an alumna of the Waseda University Weightlifting Club. She competed in the women's 63 kg event at her first Olympics in 2016 in Rio.
