= Lin Tzu-chi =

Taiwanese weightlifter (born 1988)

Medal record

Representing Chinese Taipei

Women's weightlifting

Asian Games
Gold medal – first place	2014 Incheon	-63 kg

Asian Championships
Gold medal – first place	2013 Astana	-63 kg

Lin Tzu-chi (Chinese: 林子琦; pinyin: Lín Zǐqí; formerly Lin Wan-hsuan; born 19 March 1988) is a Taiwanese weightlifter. She was to appear at the 2010 Asian Games, but was suspended from competition due to a positive drug test. Lin was banned until 2012. At the 2014 Asian Games, she set a world record in women's 63 kg, with a lift of 261 kg. She also set the clean and jerk record for her weight class, at 145 kg. The government of Taiwan awarded her NT$3 million for this accomplishment. Lin was suspended from the 2016 Summer Olympics due to another positive drug test result. The Court of Arbitration for Sport ruled in November 2018, after an appeal by the World Anti-Doping Agency, that Lin was to serve an eight-year suspension, and additionally vacated all weightlifting medals, prizes and points earned by Lin after 24 June 2016.

She attends Kaohsiung Medical University.
