= Giorgia Bordignon =

Italian weightlifter (born 1987)

Personal information
- Nationality: Italian
- Born: 24 May 1987 (age 39) Gallarate, Italy
- Height: 1.61 m (5 ft 3 in)
- Weight: 63 kg (139 lb)

Sport
- Country: Italy
- Sport: Weightlifting
- Event: Women's 63 kg
- Club: Fiamme Azzurre
Medal record
Women's Weightlifting
Representing Italy
Olympic Games
Silver medal – second place	2020 Tokyo	–64 kg
European Championships
Silver medal – second place	2018 Bucharest	–69 kg
Mediterranean Games
Silver medal – second place	2018 Tarragona	Snatch −69 kg
Silver medal – second place	2018 Tarragona	C&J −69 kg

Giorgia Bordignon (born 24 May 1987) is an Italian weightlifter. She competed at the 2020 Summer Olympics in Tokyo, and won the silver medal in the women's 64 kg event. She competed in the women's 63 kg event at the 2016 Summer Olympics.
