= Deng Wei (weightlifter) =

Chinese weightlifter (born 1993)

Personal information
- Nationality: Chinese
- Born: 14 February 1993 (age 33) Sanming, China
- Height: 1.59 m (5 ft 3 in)
- Weight: 63.40 kg (140 lb)

Sport
- Country: China
- Sport: Weightlifting
- Event: –64 kg
- Club: Fujian Province

Achievements and titles
- Personal bests: Snatch: 117 kg (2019, WR); Clean and jerk: 147 kg (2016, WR); Total: 262 kg (2016, WR)
Medal record
Representing China
Olympic Games
Gold medal – first place	2016 Rio	–63 kg
World Championships
Gold medal – first place	2010 Antalya	–58 kg
Gold medal – first place	2014 Almaty	–63 kg
Gold medal – first place	2015 Houston	–63 kg
Gold medal – first place	2018 Ashgabat	–64 kg
Gold medal – first place	2019 Pattaya	–64 kg
Asian Games
Silver medal – second place	2014 Incheon	–63 kg
Asian Championships
Gold medal – first place	2019 Ningbo	–64 kg
Summer Youth Olympics
Gold medal – first place	2010 Singapore	–58 kg

Deng Wei (simplified Chinese: 邓薇; traditional Chinese: 鄧薇; pinyin: Dèng Wéi, born 14 February 1993) is a Chinese retired weightlifter. She is an Olympic Champion, five-time World Champion and Asian Champion. She competed in the 58 kg and 63 kg categories until 2018 and 64 kg starting in 2018 after the International Weightlifting Federation reorganized the categories.

== Career ==
She competed at the 2016 Summer Olympics in the 63 kg category. She put on a dominating display, she matched the Olympic Record of 115 kg in the snatch, and set new World Records in the clean & jerk and total. She outlifted the silver medalist Choe Hyo-sim by 14 kg.

In 2018 she competed at the 2018 World Weightlifting Championships in Ashgabat, sweeping gold medals in all lifts, while setting 5 new senior world records, and outlifting the silver medalist Rim Un-sim by 14 kg.

Throughout her career she has set 20 senior world records.

== Major results ==
Year	Venue	Weight	Snatch (kg)				Clean & Jerk (kg)				Total	Rank
Year	Venue	Weight	1	2	3	Rank	1	2	3	Rank	Total	Rank
Olympic Games
2016	Rio de Janeiro, Brazil	63 kg	108	112	115	1	138	147 WR	—	1	262 WR	1st place, gold medalist(s)
World Championships
2010	Antalya, Turkey	58 kg	93	~~102~~	102	3rd place, bronze medalist(s)	120	131	135	1st place, gold medalist(s)	237	1st place, gold medalist(s)
2013	Wrocław, Poland	58 kg	105	~~108~~	108	1st place, gold medalist(s)	~~133~~	~~133~~	~~133~~	—	—	—
2014	Almaty, Kazakhstan	63 kg	~~110~~	~~110~~	110	4	130	136	142	1st place, gold medalist(s)	252	1st place, gold medalist(s)
2015	Houston, United States	63 kg	~~110~~	110	113	1st place, gold medalist(s)	140	146 WR	--	1st place, gold medalist(s)	259	1st place, gold medalist(s)
2018	Ashgabat, Turkmenistan	64 kg	~~110~~	110	112 WR	1st place, gold medalist(s)	135	138	140 WR	1st place, gold medalist(s)	252 WR	1st place, gold medalist(s)
2019	Pattaya, Thailand	64 kg	108	113	116 WR	1st place, gold medalist(s)	138	143 WR	145 WR	1st place, gold medalist(s)	261 CWR	1st place, gold medalist(s)
Asian Games
2014	Incheon, South Korea	63 kg	110	115	~~116~~	2	141	~~144~~	144 WR	2	259	2nd place, silver medalist(s)
Asian Championships
2019	Ningbo, China	64 kg	108	112	115 WR	1st place, gold medalist(s)	137	142 WR	—	1st place, gold medalist(s)	257 WR	1st place, gold medalist(s)
IWF World Cup
2019	Fuzhou, China	64 kg	108	113 WR	—	1st place, gold medalist(s)	135	141 WR	—	1st place, gold medalist(s)	254 WR	1st place, gold medalist(s)
2019	Tianjin, China	64 kg	108	113	117 CWR	1st place, gold medalist(s)	138	~~143~~	~~143~~	2nd place, silver medalist(s)	255	1st place, gold medalist(s)
Junior World Championships
2011	Penang, Malaysia	58 kg	105	110	~~112~~	1st place, gold medalist(s)	128	~~133~~	133	1st place, gold medalist(s)	243	1st place, gold medalist(s)
Youth Olympic Games
2010	Singapore, Singapore	58 kg	100	105	110	1	125	132	~~137~~	1	242	1st place, gold medalist(s)
World Youth Championships
2009	Chiang Mai, Thailand	58 kg	86	91	98	1st place, gold medalist(s)	110	116	124	1st place, gold medalist(s)	222	1st place, gold medalist(s)

== See also ==
- List of Olympic medalists in weightlifting
- List of Youth Olympic Games gold medalists who won Olympic gold medals
