= Karina Goricheva =

Kazakhstani weightlifter (born 1993)

Personal information
- Nationality: Kazakh
- Born: 8 April 1993 (age 33) Taldykorgan, Kazakhstan
- Height: 1.60 m (5 ft 3 in)
- Weight: 63 kg (139 lb)

Sport
- Country: Kazakhstan
- Sport: Weightlifting
- Event: Women's 63 kg
Medal record
Women's weightlifting
Representing Kazakhstan
Olympic Games
| Bronze medal – third place | 2016 Rio | –63 kg |

Karina Goricheva (born 8 April 1993) is a Kazakh weightlifter.

She competed at the 2016 Summer Olympics in Rio de Janeiro, where she won a bronze medal in the women's 63 kg.
