= Basketball at the 2018 Commonwealth Games =

- Venue: Cairns Convention Centre; Townsville Entertainment and Convention Centre; Gold Coast Convention and Exhibition Centre
- Dates: 5–15 April 2018
- Competitors: 192 from 11 nations

Basketball at the 2018 Commonwealth Games was held on the Gold Coast, Australia from April 5 to 15. The basketball competition was held at three venues: Cairns Convention Centre in Cairns, Townsville Entertainment and Convention Centre in Townsville for the preliminaries and the Gold Coast Convention and Exhibition Centre on the Gold Coast for the finals. This was the second time that the basketball competition was held at the Commonwealth Games. A total of eight men's and eight women's teams from a total of eleven nations competed (192 athletes, at 12 per team) in each respective tournament.

== Competition schedule ==
The following is the competition schedule for the basketball competitions: The final schedule was released on August 29, 2017.

P	Pool stage	QF	Qualifying finals	½	Semi-finals	B	Bronze Medal Match	F	Gold Medal Match

Event↓/Date →	Thu 5	Fri 6	Sat 7	Sun 8	Mon 9	Tue 10	Wed 11	Thu 12	Fri 13	Sat 14		Sun 15	
Men	P	P	P	P	P	QF				½		B	F
Women	P	P	P	P	P	QF			½	B	F		

== Venues ==
Three venues in Queensland were used. All seat 5,000 for the basketball competitions.

Gold Coast	Cairns	Basketball at the 2018 Commonwealth Games is located in Queensland	Townsville
Gold Coast Convention and Exhibition Centre	Cairns Convention Centre	Basketball at the 2018 Commonwealth Games is located in Queensland	Townsville Entertainment and Convention Centre
Capacity: 5,000	Capacity: 5,000	Basketball at the 2018 Commonwealth Games is located in Queensland	Capacity: 5,000

== Qualification ==
A total of eight men's teams and eight women's teams qualified to compete at the games. Each nation may enter one team in each tournament (12 athletes per team) for a maximum total of 24 athletes. At least four out of the six Commonwealth regions were considered to be represented in each tournament, if possible. For the home nations, each country may compete, however the ranking of Great Britain was given to the home nation with the most players on the team. In this instance its unknown which team was used to determine that. For the purpose below England is attributed the rankings spot and Scotland is noted as being invited

The teams were officially confirmed on July 28, 2017.

== Men's competition ==
=== Qualified teams ===
Event	Date	Vacancies	Qualified
Host Nation	—N/a	1	Australia
Best Commonwealth Teams in the FIBA World Rankings	1 July 2017	3	Nigeria; New Zealand; Canada
CGF/FIBA invitation	7 July 2017	4	England; Scotland; Cameroon; India
Total		8	

== Women’s competition ==
=== Qualified teams ===
Event	Date	Vacancies	Qualified
Host Nation	—N/a	1	Australia
Best Commonwealth Teams in the FIBA World Rankings	1 July 2017	3	Canada; England; Mozambique
CGF/FIBA invitation	7 July 2017	4	Jamaica; New Zealand; India; Malaysia
Total		8	

== Participating nations ==
There are 11 participating nations at the basketball competitions with a total of 192 athletes. The number of athletes a nation entered is in parentheses beside the name of the country.

- Australia (24)
- Cameroon (12)
- Canada (24)
- England (24)
- India (24)
- Jamaica (12)
- Malaysia (12)
- Mozambique (12)
- New Zealand (24)
- Nigeria (12)
- Scotland (12)

== Medal summary ==
=== Medal table ===
Rank	Nation	Gold	Silver	Bronze	Total
1	Australia	2	0	0	2
2	Canada	0	1	0	1
2	England	0	1	0	1
4	New Zealand	0	0	2	2
Totals (4 entries)		2	2	2	6

=== Medalists ===
Event	Gold	Silver	Bronze
Men	Australia; Lucas Walker; Cameron Gliddon; Chris Goulding; Jason Cadee; Mitch Norton; Nick Kay; Brad Newley; Daniel Kickert; Angus Brandt; Damian Martin; Nathan Sobey; Jesse Wagstaff	Canada; Ammanuel Diressa; Jean Pierre-Charles; Justus Alleyn; Mamadou Gueye; Jean-Victor Mukama; Munis Tutu; Grant Shephard; Mambi Diawara; David Kapinga; Conor Morgan; Erik Nissen; Michael Shoveller	New Zealand; Reuben Te Rangi; Finn Delany; Shea Ili; Jarrod Kenny; Mika Vukona; Derone Raukawa; Thomas Abercrombie; Robert Loe; Tohi Smith-Milner; Jordan Ngatai; Ethan Rusbatch; Alex Pledger
Women	Australia; Jenna O'Hea; Tessa Lavey; Stephanie Talbot; Stephanie Blicavs; Liz Cambage; Kelsey Griffin; Katie-Rae Ebzery; Belinda Snell; Ezi Magbegor; Cayla George; Alice Kunek; Nicole Seekamp	England; Melita Emanuel-Carr; Nicolette Fong Lyew Quee; Siobhan Prior; Stef Collins; Rachael Vanderwal; Georgia Jones; Hannah Shaw; Eilidh Simpson; Mollie Campbell; Chantelle Pressley; Azania Stewart; Dominique Allen	New Zealand; Zara Jillings; Erin Rooney; Micaela Cocks; Kalani Purcell; Jordan Hunter; Antonia Farnworth; Natalie Taylor; Chevannah Paalvast; Jessica Bygate; Josephine Stockill; Deena Franklin; Charlisse Leger-Walker
