= England at the 2018 Commonwealth Games =

- Flag of England
- CG code: ENG
- CGA: Commonwealth Games England
- Website: teamengland.org

in Gold Coast, Australia 4 April 2018 – 15 April 2018
- Competitors: 388 in 19 sports
- Flag bearers: Alistair Brownlee (opening); Jade Jones (closing)
- Medals Ranked 2nd: Gold 45 Silver 45 Bronze 46 Total 136

Commonwealth Games appearances (overview)
- 1930; 1934; 1938; 1950; 1954; 1958; 1962; 1966; 1970; 1974; 1978; 1982; 1986; 1990; 1994; 1998; 2002; 2006; 2010; 2014; 2018; 2022; 2026; 2030

England competed at the 2018 Commonwealth Games in Gold Coast, Australia, between 4 and 15 April 2018. It was England's 21st appearance at the Commonwealth Games, having participated at every Games since their inception in 1930.

England sent a total of 394 athletes across all 18 sports, making it the largest team ever to represent the nation at an overseas sporting event. However, only 388 athletes competed. Triathlete Alistair Brownlee was the country's flag bearer during the opening ceremony.

England finished second in the medal table behind Australia with 45 gold medals, 45 silver medals and 46 bronze medals.

With Birmingham as the host of the 2022 Commonwealth Games, the English segment was performed during the Closing Ceremony.

== Competitors ==
The following is the list of number of competitors that participated at the Games per sport/discipline.

Sport	Men	Women	Total
Athletics	39	46 (Note: Jade Jones was selected to compete in both para-athletics and paratriathlon. For this reason she has not been included in the total for the athletics component of the England team.)	85
Badminton	5	5	10
Basketball	12	12	24
Beach volleyball	2	2	4
Boxing	8	4	12
Cycling	14	13	27
Diving	9	4	13
Gymnastics	5	8	13
Hockey	18	18	36
Lawn bowls	10	7	17
Netball	—N/a	12	12
Rugby sevens	13 (Note: As a travelling reserve, Charles Hayter is not included in the total for the rugby sevens component of the England team.)	13 (Note: As a travelling reserve, Vicky Fleetwood is not included in the total for the rugby sevens component of the England team.)	26
Shooting	13	8	21
Squash	5	4	9
Swimming	17	20	37
Table tennis	6	5	11
Triathlon	5	5	10
Weightlifting	8	10	18
Wrestling	4	1	5
Total	192	196	388

== Medal table (top three) ==
Rank	Nation	Gold	Silver	Bronze	Total
1	Australia	80	59	59	198
2	England	45	45	46	136
3	India	26	20	20	66
Totals (3 entries)		151	124	125	400

== Medallists ==
Medal	Name	Sport	Event	Date
1st place, gold medalist(s)	Ellie Robinson	Swimming	Women's S7 50 metre butterfly	5 April 2018
1st place, gold medalist(s)	Aimee Willmott	Swimming	Women's 400 metre individual medley	5 April 2018
1st place, gold medalist(s)	Thomas Hamer	Swimming	Men's S14 200 metre freestyle	5 April 2018
1st place, gold medalist(s)	James Wilby	Swimming	Men's 200 metre breaststroke	5 April 2018
1st place, gold medalist(s)	Sophie Thornhill; Helen Scott (pilot)	Cycling	Women's tandem sprint B	5 April 2018
1st place, gold medalist(s)	Dominick Cunningham; James Hall; Courtney Tulloch; Max Whitlock; Nile Wilson	Gymnastics	Men's artistic team all-around	5 April 2018
1st place, gold medalist(s)	Sarah Vasey	Swimming	Women's 50 metre breastroke	6 April 2018
1st place, gold medalist(s)	Charlie Tanfield	Cycling	Men's individual pursuit	6 April 2018
1st place, gold medalist(s)	Alice Tai	Swimming	Women's S9 100 metre backstroke	6 April 2018
1st place, gold medalist(s)	Joe Townsend	Triathlon	Men's PTWC	7 April 2018
1st place, gold medalist(s)	Jade Jones	Triathlon	Women's PTWC	7 April 2018
1st place, gold medalist(s)	Nile Wilson	Gymnastics	Men's individual all-around	7 April 2018
1st place, gold medalist(s)	Sophie Thornhill; Helen Scott (pilot)	Cycling	Women's tandem kilo B	7 April 2018
1st place, gold medalist(s)	Adam Peaty	Swimming	Men's 100 metre breaststroke	7 April 2018
1st place, gold medalist(s)	Nick Miller	Athletics	Men's hammer throw	8 April 2018
1st place, gold medalist(s)	Courtney Tulloch	Gymnastics	Men's rings	8 April 2018
1st place, gold medalist(s)	Georgia-Mae Fenton	Gymnastics	Women's uneven bars	8 April 2018
1st place, gold medalist(s)	Emily Godley	Weightlifting	Women's 75 kg	8 April 2018
1st place, gold medalist(s)	Siobhan-Marie O'Connor	Swimming	Women's 200 metre individual medley	8 April 2018
1st place, gold medalist(s)	Nile Wilson	Gymnastics	Men's horizontal bar	9 April 2018
1st place, gold medalist(s)	Alice Kinsella	Gymnastics	Women's balance beam	9 April 2018
1st place, gold medalist(s)	James Willstrop	Squash	Men's singles	9 April 2018
1st place, gold medalist(s)	Ben Proud	Swimming	Men's 50 metre freestyle	10 April 2018
1st place, gold medalist(s)	David Luckman; Parag Patel	Shooting	Queen's Prize pairs	10 April 2018
1st place, gold medalist(s)	Jack Laugher	Diving	Men's 1 metre springboard	11 April 2018
1st place, gold medalist(s)	Annie Last	Cycling	Women's cross-country	12 April 2018
1st place, gold medalist(s)	Jack Laugher	Diving	Men's 3 metre springboard	12 April 2018
1st place, gold medalist(s)	Sophie Hahn	Athletics	Women's T38 100 metres	12 April 2018
1st place, gold medalist(s)	Tom Daley; Dan Goodfellow	Diving	Men's synchronised 10 metre platform	13 April 2018
1st place, gold medalist(s)	Jack Laugher; Chris Mears	Diving	Men's synchronised 3 metre springboard	13 April 2018
1st place, gold medalist(s)	Katarina Johnson-Thompson	Athletics	Women's heptathlon	13 April 2018
1st place, gold medalist(s)	Zharnel Hughes; Richard Kilty; Reuben Arthur; Harry Aikines-Aryeetey	Athletics	Men's 4 × 100 metres relay	14 April 2018
1st place, gold medalist(s)	Asha Philip; Lorraine Ugen; Bianca Williams; Dina Asher-Smith	Athletics	Women's 4 × 100 metres relay	14 April 2018
1st place, gold medalist(s)	Ross Wilson	Table tennis	Men's TT6–10 singles	14 April 2018
1st place, gold medalist(s)	Paul Drinkhall; Liam Pitchford	Table tennis	Men's doubles	14 April 2018
1st place, gold medalist(s)	Lisa Whiteside	Boxing	Women's flyweight	14 April 2018
1st place, gold medalist(s)	Sandy Ryan	Boxing	Women's welterweight	14 April 2018
1st place, gold medalist(s)	Galal Yafai	Boxing	Men's light flyweight	14 April 2018
1st place, gold medalist(s)	David Luckman	Shooting	Queen's Prize individual	14 April 2018
1st place, gold medalist(s)	Peter McGrail	Boxing	Men's bantamweight	14 April 2018
1st place, gold medalist(s)	Pat McCormack	Boxing	Men's welterweight	14 April 2018
1st place, gold medalist(s)	Frazer Clarke	Boxing	Men's super heavyweight	14 April 2018
1st place, gold medalist(s)	Chris Adcock; Gabby Adcock	Badminton	Mixed doubles	15 April 2018
1st place, gold medalist(s)	Marcus Ellis; Chris Langridge	Badminton	Men's doubles	15 April 2018
1st place, gold medalist(s)	England netball team: Ama Agbeze (C); Eboni Beckford-Chambers; Jade Clarke; Beth Cobden; Kadeen Corbin; Jodie Gibson; Serena Guthrie; Jo Harten; Natalie Haythornthwaite; Helen Housby; Geva Mentor; Chelsea Pitman	Netball	Tournament	15 April 2018
2nd place, silver medalist(s)	Jessica Learmonth	Triathlon	Women's triathlon	5 April 2018
2nd place, silver medalist(s)	Philip Hindes; Ryan Owens; Joseph Truman	Cycling	Men's team sprint	5 April 2018
2nd place, silver medalist(s)	Kian Emadi; Ethan Hayter; Charlie Tanfield; Oliver Wood	Cycling	Men's team pursuit	5 April 2018
2nd place, silver medalist(s)	Georgia-Mae Fenton; Alice Kinsella; Taeja James; Kelly Simm; Lucy Stanhope	Gymnastics	Women's artistic team all-around	6 April 2018
2nd place, silver medalist(s)	Lewis White	Swimming	Men's S9 100 metre freestyle	6 April 2018
2nd place, silver medalist(s)	David Cumberlidge; Jarvis Parkinson; Ben Proud; James Guy; Elliot Clogg; Cameron Kurle	Swimming	Men's 4 × 100 metre freestyle relay	6 April 2018
2nd place, silver medalist(s)	James Hall	Gymnastics	Men's individual all-around	7 April 2018
2nd place, silver medalist(s)	Jack Oliver	Weightlifting	Men's 77 kg	7 April 2018
2nd place, silver medalist(s)	Alistair Brownlee; Jonny Brownlee; Vicky Holland; Jessica Learmonth	Triathlon	Mixed relay	7 April 2018
2nd place, silver medalist(s)	Zoe Smith	Weightlifting	Women's 63 kg	7 April 2018
2nd place, silver medalist(s)	James Wilby	Swimming	Men's 100 metre breaststroke	7 April 2018
2nd place, silver medalist(s)	Molly Renshaw	Swimming	Women's 200 metre breaststroke	7 April 2018
2nd place, silver medalist(s)	Tom Bosworth	Athletics	Men's 20 kilometre walk	8 April 2018
2nd place, silver medalist(s)	Max Whitlock	Gymnastics	Men's pommel horse	8 April 2018
2nd place, silver medalist(s)	Sarah Davies	Weightlifting	Women's 69 kg	8 April 2018
2nd place, silver medalist(s)	Amber Hill	Shooting	Women's skeet	8 April 2018
2nd place, silver medalist(s)	Nile Wilson	Gymnastics	Men's rings	8 April 2018
2nd place, silver medalist(s)	Alice Tai	Swimming	Women's S9 100 metre freestyle	8 April 2018
2nd place, silver medalist(s)	Cameron Kurle; Jarvis Parkinson; Nick Grainger; James Guy	Swimming	Men's 4 × 200 metre freestyle relay	8 April 2018
2nd place, silver medalist(s)	James Hall	Gymnastics	Men's horizontal bar	9 April 2018
2nd place, silver medalist(s)	Nile Wilson	Gymnastics	Men's parallel bars	9 April 2018
2nd place, silver medalist(s)	Courtney Tulloch	Gymnastics	Men's vault	9 April 2018
2nd place, silver medalist(s)	Sarah-Jane Perry	Squash	Women's singles	9 April 2018
2nd place, silver medalist(s)	Adam Peaty	Swimming	Men's 50 metre breaststroke	9 April 2018
2nd place, silver medalist(s)	James Guy	Swimming	Men's 100 metre butterfly	9 April 2018
2nd place, silver medalist(s)	Harry Tanfield	Cycling	Men's road time trial	10 April 2018
2nd place, silver medalist(s)	Holly Hibbott	Swimming	Women's 400 metre freestyle	10 April 2018
2nd place, silver medalist(s)	Luke Greenbank; Adam Peaty; James Guy; Ben Proud; Elliot Clogg; James Wilby; Jacob Peters; David Cumberlidge	Swimming	Men's 4 × 100 metre medley relay	10 April 2018
2nd place, silver medalist(s)	Louise Sugden	Weightlifting	Women's heavyweight (powerlifting)	10 April 2018
2nd place, silver medalist(s)	Alicia Blagg; Katherine Torrance	Diving	Women's synchronised 3 metre springboard	11 April 2018
2nd place, silver medalist(s)	Evie Richards	Cycling	Women's cross-country	12 April 2018
2nd place, silver medalist(s)	Kyle Langford	Athletics	Men's 800 metres	12 April 2018
2nd place, silver medalist(s)	James Arnott	Athletics	Men's T47 100 metres	13 April 2018
2nd place, silver medalist(s)	Matthew Dixon; Noah Williams	Diving	Men's synchronised 10 metre platform	13 April 2018
2nd place, silver medalist(s)	Morgan Lake	Athletics	Women's high jump	14 April 2018
2nd place, silver medalist(s)	Kim Daybell	Table tennis	Men's TT6–10 singles	14 April 2018
2nd place, silver medalist(s)	Matthew Dixon	Diving	Men's 10 metre platform	14 April 2018
2nd place, silver medalist(s)	England women's basketball team: Melita Emanuel-Carr; Nicolette Fong Lyew Quee; Siobhan Prior; Stef Collins; Rachael Vanderwal; Georgia Jones; Hannah Shaw; Eilidh Simpson; Mollie Campbell; Chantelle Pressley; Azania Stewart (C); Dominique Allen	Basketball	Women's tournament	14 April 2018
2nd place, silver medalist(s)	Paige Murney	Boxing	Women's lightweight	14 April 2018
2nd place, silver medalist(s)	Aaron Heading	Shooting	Men's trap	14 April 2018
2nd place, silver medalist(s)	John Smith	Athletics	Men's T54 marathon	15 April 2018
2nd place, silver medalist(s)	Lauren Smith; Sarah Walker	Badminton	Women's doubles	15 April 2018
2nd place, silver medalist(s)	Liam Pitchford; Tin-Tin Ho	Table tennis	Mixed doubles	15 April 2018
2nd place, silver medalist(s)	Marcus Ellis; Lauren Smith	Badminton	Mixed doubles	15 April 2018
2nd place, silver medalist(s)	Daryl Selby; Adrian Waller	Squash	Men's doubles	15 April 2018
3rd place, bronze medalist(s)	Lauren Bate; Katy Marchant	Cycling	Women's team sprint	5 April 2018
3rd place, bronze medalist(s)	James Guy	Swimming	Men's 400 metre freestyle	5 April 2018
3rd place, bronze medalist(s)	Freya Anderson; Ellie Faulkner; Anna Hopkin; Siobhan-Marie O'Connor	Swimming	Women's 4 × 100 metre freestyle relay	5 April 2018
3rd place, bronze medalist(s)	Alice Kinsella	Gymnastics	Women's artistic individual all-around	7 April 2018
3rd place, bronze medalist(s)	Christopher Latham	Cycling	Men's scratch race	7 April 2018
3rd place, bronze medalist(s)	Freya Anderson; Ellie Faulkner; Holly Hibbott; Siobhan-Marie O'Connor	Swimming	Women's 4 × 200 metre freestyle relay	7 April 2018
3rd place, bronze medalist(s)	Tin-Tin Ho; Kelly Sibley; Maria Tsaptsinos	Table tennis	Women's team	8 April 2018
3rd place, bronze medalist(s)	Emily Kay	Cycling	Women's scratch race	8 April 2018
3rd place, bronze medalist(s)	Ethan Hayter	Cycling	Men's points race	8 April 2018
3rd place, bronze medalist(s)	Dominick Cunningham	Gymnastics	Men's vault	9 April 2018
3rd place, bronze medalist(s)	Kelly Simm	Gymnastics	Women's balance beam	9 April 2018
3rd place, bronze medalist(s)	Marcus Ellis; Lauren Smith; Rajiv Ouseph; Chris Langridge; Chris Adcock; Gabby Adcock; Chloe Birch; Jessica Pugh; Ben Lane; Sarah Walker	Badminton	Mixed team	9 April 2018
3rd place, bronze medalist(s)	Paul Drinkhall; David McBeath; Liam Pitchford; Sam Walker	Table tennis	Men's team	9 April 2018
3rd place, bronze medalist(s)	Owen Boxall	Weightlifting	Men's 105 kg	9 April 2018
3rd place, bronze medalist(s)	Emily Campbell	Weightlifting	Women's +90 kg	9 April 2018
3rd place, bronze medalist(s)	James Wilby	Swimming	Men's 50 metre breaststroke	9 April 2018
3rd place, bronze medalist(s)	Zoe Newson	Weightlifting	Women's lightweight (powerlifting)	10 April 2018
3rd place, bronze medalist(s)	Ali Jawad	Weightlifting	Men's lightweight (powerlifting)	10 April 2018
3rd place, bronze medalist(s)	Hayley Simmonds	Cycling	Women's road time trial	10 April 2018
3rd place, bronze medalist(s)	Kenneth Parr	Shooting	Men's 50 metre rifle prone	10 April 2018
3rd place, bronze medalist(s)	Ellie Faulkner	Swimming	Women's 400 metre freestyle	10 April 2018
3rd place, bronze medalist(s)	Ellen Falkner; Sian Honnor; Katherine Rednall	Lawn bowls	Women's triples	12 April 2018
3rd place, bronze medalist(s)	Georgina Nelthorpe	Wrestling	Women's freestyle 76 kg	12 April 2018
3rd place, bronze medalist(s)	Luke Cutts	Athletics	Men's pole vault	12 April 2018
3rd place, bronze medalist(s)	Shara Proctor	Athletics	Women's long jump	12 April 2018
3rd place, bronze medalist(s)	Dina Asher-Smith	Athletics	Women's 200 metres	12 April 2018
3rd place, bronze medalist(s)	Lois Toulson	Diving	Women's 10 metre platform	12 April 2018
3rd place, bronze medalist(s)	David Bolt; Jamie Chestney; Louis Ridout; Sam Tolchard	Lawn bowls	Men's fours	13 April 2018
3rd place, bronze medalist(s)	Robert Paxton	Lawn bowls	Men's singles	13 April 2018
3rd place, bronze medalist(s)	Sam Gowin	Shooting	Men's 25 metre rapid fire pistol	13 April 2018
3rd place, bronze medalist(s)	Charlie Bowling	Wrestling	Men's freestyle 65 kg	13 April 2018
3rd place, bronze medalist(s)	Niamh Emerson	Athletics	Women's heptathlon	13 April 2018
3rd place, bronze medalist(s)	Luke McCormack	Boxing	Men's light welterweight	13 April 2018
3rd place, bronze medalist(s)	Cheavon Clarke	Boxing	Men's heavyweight	13 April 2018
3rd place, bronze medalist(s)	Laura Weightman	Athletics	Women's 5000 metres	14 April 2018
3rd place, bronze medalist(s)	Rajiv Ouseph	Badminton	Men's singles	14 April 2018
3rd place, bronze medalist(s)	Dean Bale	Shooting	Men's 50 metre three positions	14 April 2018
3rd place, bronze medalist(s)	Parag Patel	Shooting	Queen's Prize individual	14 April 2018
3rd place, bronze medalist(s)	Syerus Eslami	Wrestling	Men's freestyle 86 kg	14 April 2018
3rd place, bronze medalist(s)	England women's field hockey team: Maddie Hinch (GK); Kathryn Lane; Laura Unsworth; Sarah Haycroft; Anna Toman; Hannah Martin; Susannah Townsend; Suzy Petty; Ellie Rayer; Alex Danson (C); Emily Defroand; Giselle Ansley; Sophie Bray; Hollie Pearne-Webb; Ellie Watton; Amy Tennant; Grace Balsdon; Jo Hunter	Hockey	Women's tournament	14 April 2018
3rd place, bronze medalist(s)	England men's field hockey team: George Pinner (GK / C); Harry Gibson (GK); Ollie Willars; Henry Weir; Harry Martin; Chris Griffiths; Ian Sloan (C); Sam Ward; Mark Gleghorne; Phil Roper (C); Adam Dixon; Barry Middleton; Brendan Creed; David Goodfield; Liam Ansell; David Condon; James Gall; Liam Sanford	Hockey	Men's tournament	14 April 2018
3rd place, bronze medalist(s)	Simon Lawson	Athletics	Men's T54 marathon	15 April 2018
3rd place, bronze medalist(s)	Jade Jones	Athletics	Women's T54 marathon	15 April 2018
3rd place, bronze medalist(s)	Declan James; James Willstrop	Squash	Men's doubles	15 April 2018
3rd place, bronze medalist(s)	England women's rugby sevens team: Abbie Brown (C); Claire Allan; Lydia Thompson; Emily Scarratt; Natasha Hunt; Deborah Fleming; Heather Fisher; Emily Scott; Alex Matthews; Megan Jones; Jess Breach; Amy Wilson-Hardy	Rugby sevens	Women's tournament	15 April 2018
3rd place, bronze medalist(s)	England men's rugby sevens team: Alex Davis; Tom Mitchell (C); Dan Norton; Dan Bibby; Ethan Waddleton; Harry Glover; James Rodwell; Michael Ellery; Oliver Lindsay-Hague; Philip Burgess; Richard de Carpentier; Ruaridh McConnochie	Rugby sevens	Men's tournament	15 April 2018

Relay competitors named in italics did not participate in the corresponding finals.

Medals by sport
Sport	1st place, gold medalist(s)	2nd place, silver medalist(s)	3rd place, bronze medalist(s)	Total
Athletics	5	5	7	17
Badminton	2	2	2	6
Basketball	0	1	0	1
Boxing	6	1	2	9
Cycling	4	4	5	13
Diving	4	3	1	8
Gymnastics	6	7	3	16
Hockey	0	0	2	2
Lawn bowls	0	0	3	3
Netball	1	0	0	1
Powerlifting	0	1	2	3
Rugby sevens	0	0	2	2
Shooting	2	2	4	8
Squash	1	2	1	4
Swimming	9	10	5	24
Table tennis	2	2	2	6
Triathlon	2	2	0	4
Weightlifting	1	3	2	6
Wrestling	0	0	3	3
Total	45	45	46	136

Medals by day
Day	1st place, gold medalist(s)	2nd place, silver medalist(s)	3rd place, bronze medalist(s)	Total
5 April	6	3	3	12
6 April	3	3	0	6
7 April	5	6	3	14
8 April	5	7	3	15
9 April	3	6	7	16
10 April	2	4	5	11
11 April	1	1	0	2
12 April	3	2	6	11
13 April	3	2	7	12
14 April	11	6	7	24
15 April	3	5	5	13
Total	45	45	46	136

Medals by gender
Gender	1st place, gold medalist(s)	2nd place, silver medalist(s)	3rd place, bronze medalist(s)	Total
Female	18	16	22	56
Male	26	26	23	75
Mixed	1	3	1	5
Total	45	45	46	136

== Athletics ==
On 24 October 2017, Commonwealth Games England announced a squad of 75 athletes consisting of 35 men and 40 women. Since the initial announcement, selected relay athletes were given permission to fill any remaining slots in the individual sprints.

On 11 December 2017, Commonwealth Games England announced the selection of eighteen athletes to compete in the para-athletic events in Gold Coast. Jade Jones will compete in both the para-athletics and paratriathlon.

Key:

- Q = Qualified for the next round
- q = Qualified for the next round as a fastest loser or, in field events, by position without achieving the qualifying target
- DNS = Did not start
- DNF = Did not finish
- DSQ = Disqualified
- GR = Games record
- NR = National record
- N/A = Round not applicable for the event
- Bye = Athlete not required to compete in round
Note–Ranks given for track events are across all heats

=== Men ===
Track & road events

Athlete	Event	Heat		Semifinal		Final	
Athlete	Event	Result	Rank	Result	Rank	Result	Rank
Harry Aikines-Aryeetey	100 m	10.30	11 Q	10.26	10	Did not advance	
Adam Gemili	100 m	10.24	7 Q	10.11	3 Q	DNS	
Zac Shaw	100 m (T12)	—N/a		11.58	2	Did not advance	
Amar Aichoun	100 m (T38)	—N/a				12.14	8
James Arnott	100 m (T47)	—N/a				11.30	2nd place, silver medalist(s)
Zharnel Hughes	200 m	20.34	2 Q	20.37	3 Q	DSQ	
Richard Kilty	200 m	21.08	22 Q	20.67	5	Did not advance	
Dwayne Cowan	400 m	45.68	4 Q	46.06	10	Did not advance	
Matthew Hudson-Smith	400 m	DSQ		Did not advance			
Rabah Yousif	400 m	46.09	11 Q	46.05	9	Did not advance	
Elliot Giles	800 m	1:48.54	15	—N/a		Did not advance	
Kyle Langford	800 m	1:45.61	3 Q	—N/a		1:45.16	2nd place, silver medalist(s)
Andrew Osagie	800 m	1:48.20	14	—N/a		Did not advance	
Charlie Grice	1500 m	3:47.19	11 Q	—N/a		3:37.43	4
Richard Chiassaro	1500 m (T54)	3:05.76 GR	1 Q	—N/a		3:18.63	8
Dillon Labrooy	1500 m (T54)	3:12.07	6 Q	—N/a		3:12.82	5
Nathan Maguire	1500 m (T54)	3:06.95	3 Q	—N/a		3:12.73	4
Andy Vernon	10000 m	—N/a				28:17.11	9
David King	110 m hurdles	13.74	10	—N/a		Did not advance	
Andrew Pozzi	110 m hurdles	13.29	1 Q	—N/a		13.53	7
Jack Green	400 m hurdles	49.14	4 Q	—N/a		49.18	4
Zharnel Hughes; Richard Kilty; Reuben Arthur; Harry Aikines-Aryeetey	4 × 100 m relay	38.15	1 Q	—N/a		38.10	1st place, gold medalist(s)
Matthew Hudson-Smith; Dwayne Cowan; Rabah Yousif; Jack Green	4 × 400 m relay	DNF		—N/a		Did not advance	
Callum Hall	Marathon (T54)	—N/a				1:37.36	7
Simon Lawson	Marathon (T54)	—N/a				1:31.44	3rd place, bronze medalist(s)
John Smith	Marathon (T54)	—N/a				1:31.44	2nd place, silver medalist(s)
Tom Bosworth	20 km race walk	—N/a				1:19.38 NR	2nd place, silver medalist(s)
Callum Wilkinson	20 km race walk	—N/a				1:22.35	7

Field Events

Athlete	Event	Qualification		Final	
Athlete	Event	Distance	Rank	Distance	Rank
Dan Bramble	Long jump	8.02	4 Q	7.94	5
Nathan Douglas	Triple jump	16.27	6 q	16.35	5
Nathan Fox	Triple jump	DNS		Did not advance	
Chris Baker	High jump	2.21	=1 q	2.21	9
Tom Gale	High jump	2.18	14	Did not advance	
Robbie Grabarz	High jump	2.21	7 q	2.18	12
Luke Cutts	Pole vault	—N/a		5.45	3rd place, bronze medalist(s)
Adam Hague	Pole vault	—N/a		5.45	4
Joshua Bain	Shot put (F38)	11.87	5 Q	12.31	5
Nick Miller	Hammer throw	76.48	1 Q	80.26 GR NR	1st place, gold medalist(s)
Taylor Campbell	Hammer throw	71.69	3 Q	72.03	5

Combined events – Decathlon

Athlete	Event	100 m	LJ	SP	HJ	400 m	110H	DT	PV	JT	1500 m	Final	Rank
John Lane	Result	10.89	7.26	12.93	1.92	49.64	14.96	43.79	4.80	49.86	5:08.56	7529	6
John Lane	Points	885	876	663	731	831	854	742	849	587	511	7529	6

=== Women ===
Track & road events

Athlete	Event	Heat		Semifinal		Final	
Athlete	Event	Result	Rank	Result	Rank	Result	Rank
Corinne Humphreys	100 m	11.62	=12 Q	11.66	15	Did not advance	
Asha Philip	100 m	11.31	3 Q	11.21	1 Q	11.28	4
Daphne Schrager	100 m (T35)	—N/a				17.09	8
Maria Verdeille	100 m (T35)	—N/a				19.38	6
Sophie Hahn	100 m (T38)	—N/a				12.46 GR	1st place, gold medalist(s)
Katrina Hart	100 m (T38)	—N/a				14.82	6
Finette Agyapong	200 m	23.15	6 Q	23.38	3	Did not advance	
Dina Asher-Smith	200 m	23.28	9 Q	22.44	2 Q	22.29	3rd place, bronze medalist(s)
Bianca Williams	200 m	23.20	7 Q	23.23	3 q	23.06	7
Emily Diamond	400 m	52.26	9 Q	52.02	8	Did not advance	
Anyika Onuora	400 m	53.13	18 q	52.73	13	Did not advance	
Perri Shakes-Drayton	400 m	DNS		Did not advance			
Alexandra Bell	800 m	2:00.11	2 Q	—N/a		2:00.83	5
Shelayna Oskan-Clarke	800 m	2:00.81	11	—N/a		Did not advance	
Adelle Tracey	800 m	2:02.03	18	—N/a		Did not advance	
Jessica Judd	1500 m	4:08.87	12 Q	—N/a		4:08.82	14
Sarah McDonald	1500 m	4:09.54	13 Q	—N/a		4:05.77	8
Katie Snowden	1500 m	4:08.00	7 Q	—N/a		4:06.55	11
Nicole Emerson	1500 m (T54)	—N/a				3:51.28	6
Laura Weightman	5000 m	—N/a				15:25.84	3rd place, bronze medalist(s)
Tiffany Porter	100 m hurdles	12.99	4 Q	—N/a		13.12	6
Alicia Barrett	100 m hurdles	13.19	8 q	—N/a		13.64	8
Meghan Beesley	400 m hurdles	56.41	11	—N/a		Did not advance	
Jessica Turner	400 m hurdles	58.26	14	—N/a		Did not advance	
Rosie Clarke	3000 m steeplechase	—N/a				9:36.29	4
Iona Lake	3000 m steeplechase	—N/a				9:58.92	8
Asha Philip; Bianca Williams; Dina Asher-Smith; Lorraine Ugen	4 × 100 m relay	—N/a				42.46 ENR	1st place, gold medalist(s)
Anyika Onuora; Emily Diamond; Finette Agyapong; Perri Shakes-Drayton	4 × 400 m relay	—N/a				3:27.21	4
Alyson Dixon	Marathon	—N/a				2:38.19	6
Sonia Samuels	Marathon	—N/a				2:36.59	5
Nicole Emerson	Marathon (T54)	—N/a				1:50.13	6
Jade Jones	Marathon (T54)	—N/a				1:44.20	3rd place, bronze medalist(s)
Gemma Bridge	20 km race walk	—N/a				1:39.31	5

Field events

Athlete	Event	Qualification		Final	
Athlete	Event	Distance	Position	Distance	Position
Shara Proctor	Long jump	6.89	1 Q	6.75	3rd place, bronze medalist(s)
Jazmin Sawyers	Long jump	6.47	5 q	6.35	7
Lorraine Ugen	Long jump	6.42	8 q	6.69	4
Molly Kingsbury	Long jump (F38)	—N/a		3.85	6
Morgan Lake	High jump	—N/a		1.93	2nd place, silver medalist(s)
Bethan Partridge	High jump	—N/a		1.84	8
Holly Bradshaw	Pole vault	—N/a		4.60	4
Lucy Bryan	Pole vault	—N/a		4.30	7
Molly Caudery	Pole vault	—N/a		4.40	5
Sophie McKinna	Shot put	17.24	4 Q	17.76	5
Amelia Strickler	Shot put	16.57	9 Q	16.78	9
Rachel Wallader	Shot put	17.20	5 Q	17.48	6
Jade Lally	Discus throw	—N/a		53.97	7
Sophie Hitchon	Hammer throw	—N/a		X	-

Combined events – Heptathlon

Athlete	Event	100H	HJ	SP	200 m	LJ	JT	800 m	Final	Rank
Niamh Emerson	Result	14.08	1.84	12.13	24.83	6.06	40.43	2:12.18	6043	3rd place, bronze medalist(s)
Niamh Emerson	Points	967	1029	670	902	868	674	933	6043	3rd place, bronze medalist(s)
Katarina Johnson-Thompson	Result	13.54	1.87	11.54	23.56	6.50	40.46	2:21.24	6255	1st place, gold medalist(s)
Katarina Johnson-Thompson	Points	1044	1067	631	1023	1007	676	807	6255	1st place, gold medalist(s)
Katie Stainton	Result	DSQ	1.72	DNS					DNF	
Katie Stainton	Points	-	879	-	-	-	-	-	DNF	

Relay competitors named in italics did not participate in the corresponding finals.

== Badminton ==
On 8 February 2018, Team England announced its squad of 10 players, 5 of which are male and 5 female.

Singles

Athlete	Event	Round of 64	Round of 32	Round of 16	Quarterfinal	Semifinal	Final / BM	
Athlete	Event	Opposition Score	Opposition Score	Opposition Score	Opposition Score	Opposition Score	Opposition Score	Rank
Rajiv Ouseph	Men's singles	Bye	Ekiring (UGA); W 2-0	Mulenga (ZAM); W 2-0	Ho-Shue (CAN); W 2-0	Kidambi (IND); L 0-2	Bronze medal match Prannoy (IND); W 2-1	3rd place, bronze medalist(s)
Chloe Birch	Women's singles	Scholtz (RSA); W 2-0	Dixon (JER); W 2-0	Gimour (SCO); L 0-2	Did not advance			

Doubles

Athlete	Event	Round of 64	Round of 32	Round of 16	Quarterfinal	Semifinal	Final / BM	
Athlete	Event	Opposition Score	Opposition Score	Opposition Score	Opposition Score	Opposition Score	Opposition Score	Rank
Chris Langridge; Marcus Ellis	Men's doubles	—N/a	Bye	Lindeman & Yang (CAN); W 2-0	Chrisnanta & Hee (SGP); W 2-0	Goh & Tan (MAS); W 2-1	Rankireddy & Shetty (IND); W 2-0	1st place, gold medalist(s)
Chris Adcock; Ben Lane	Men's doubles	—N/a	Middleton & Smith (AUS); W 2-0	Chan & Goh (MAS); L 1-2	Did not advance			
Lauren Smith; Sarah Walker	Women's doubles	—N/a	Bye	MacPherson & O'Donnell (SCO); W 2-0	Hendahewa & Sirimannage (SRI); W 2-0	Mapasa & Somerville (AUS); W 2-0	Chow & Hoo (MAS); L 0-2	2nd place, silver medalist(s)
Chloe Birch; Jessica Pugh	Women's doubles	—N/a	Bye	Johnson & le Tissier (GUE); W 2-0	Chow & Hoo (MAS); L 0-2	Did not advance		
Gabby Adcock; Chris Adcock	Mixed doubles	Bye	Yang & Li (CAN); W 2-0	Wong & Ong (SGP); W 2-0	Serasinghe & Mapasa (AUS); W 2-0	Goh & Chan (MAS); W 2-0	Smith & Ellis (ENG); W 2-1	1st place, gold medalist(s)
Lauren Smith; Marcus Ellis	Mixed doubles	Bye	Campbell & MacPherson (SCO); W 2-0	Leydon-Davis & Leydon-Davis (NZL); W 2-0	Tan & Hee (SGP); W 2-0	Rankireddy & Ponnappa (IND); W 2-1	Adcock & Adcock (ENG); L 1-2	2nd place, silver medalist(s)
Ben Lane; Jessica Pugh	Mixed doubles	Bye	Rankireddy & Ponnappa (IND); L 0-2	Did not advance				

Mixed team

Summary

Team	Event	Group stage				Quarterfinal	Semifinal	Final / BM	
Team	Event	Opposition Score	Opposition Score	Opposition Score	Rank	Opposition Score	Opposition Score	Opposition Score	Rank
England	Mixed team	Uganda; W 5–0	South Africa; W 5–0	Australia; W 5–0	1 Q	Canada; W 3-0	Malaysia; L 0-3	Bronze medal match Singapore; W 3-0	3rd place, bronze medalist(s)

Squad

- Chris Adcock
- Gabby Adcock
- Chloe Birch
- Marcus Ellis
- Ben Lane
- Chris Langridge
- Rajiv Ouseph
- Jessica Pugh
- Lauren Smith
- Sarah Walker

Pool C

Pos	Team	Pld	W	L	MF	MA	MD	GF	GA	GD	PF	PA	PD	Pts	Qualification
1	England	3	3	0	15	0	+15	30	0	+30	630	345	+285	3	Knockout stage
2	Australia	3	2	1	9	6	+3	19	12	+7	576	472	+104	2	Knockout stage
3	South Africa	3	1	2	3	12	−9	6	24	−18	410	592	−182	1	
4	Uganda	3	0	3	3	12	−9	6	25	−19	406	613	−207	0	

Updated to match(es) played on 6 April 2018. Source: GC2018

England
5
Carrara Sports and Leisure Centre, Gold Coast
5 April

Uganda
0

			1	2	3
1	(England) (Uganda)	Chris Adcock / Gabby Adcock; Brian Kasirye / Aisha Nakiyemba	21; 5	21; 9
2	(England) (Uganda)	Rajiv Ouseph; Edwin Ekiring	21; 11	21; 15
3	(England) (Uganda)	Chloe Birch; Shamim Bangi	21; 12	21; 10
4	(England) (Uganda)	Chris Langridge / Marcus Ellis; Brian Kasirye / Edwin Ekiring	21; 9	21; 5
5	(England) (Uganda)	Jessica Pugh / Chloe Birch; Aisha Nakiyemba / Shamim Bangi	21; 12	21; 12

England
5
Carrara Sports and Leisure Centre, Gold Coast
6 April

South Africa
0

			1	2	3
1	(England) (South Africa)	Ben Lane / Jessica Pugh; Prakash Vijayanath / Michelle Butler-Emmett	21; 12	21; 15
2	(England) (South Africa)	Rajiv Ouseph; Bongani von Bodenstein	21; 7	21; 7
3	(England) (South Africa)	Chloe Birch; Johanita Scholtz	21; 10	21; 10
4	(England) (South Africa)	Chris Adcock / Ben Lane; Cameron Coetzer / Bongani von Bodenstein	21; 7	21; 6
5	(England) (South Africa)	Sarah Walker / Lauren Smith; Michelle Butler-Emmett / Elsie de Velliers	21; 12	21; 17

England
5
Carrara Sports and Leisure Centre, Gold Coast
6 April

Australia
0

			1	2	3
1	(England) (Australia)	Chris Adcock / Gabby Adcock; Sawan Serasinghe / Setyana Mapasa	21; 15	21; 15
2	(England) (Australia)	Rajiv Ouseph; Anthony Joe	21; 13	21; 11
3	(England) (Australia)	Marcus Ellis / Chris Langridge; Sawan Serasinghe / Matthew Chau	21; 14	21; 8
4	(England) (Australia)	Chloe Birch; Chen Hsuan-yu	21; 15	21; 15
5	(England) (Australia)	Lauren Smith / Sarah Walker; Setyana Mapasa / Gronya Somerville	21; 17	21; 19

== Basketball ==
England has qualified both men's and women's teams for a total of 24 athletes. The men's team was invited by FIBA and the CGF, while the women's team qualified as being one of the top three ranked teams in the Commonwealth (minus the host nation Australia). Each team will consist of twelve players.

Both teams were announced on 16 March 2018.

Summary

Team	Event	Preliminary round				Qualifying final	Semifinal	Final / BM	
Team	Event	Opposition Score	Opposition Score	Opposition Score	Rank	Opposition Score	Opposition Score	Opposition Score	Rank
England men's	Men's tournament	Scotland; L 65–78	India; W 100–54	Cameroon; W 81–54	2 Q	Canada; L 79–97	Did not advance		
England women's	Women's tournament	Canada; L 54–80	Mozambique; W 78–51	Australia; L 55–118	3 q	Jamaica; W 62–40	Canada; W 65-53	Australia; L 55-99	2nd place, silver medalist(s)

=== Men's tournament ===
Roster

- Adam Thoseby
- Andrew Lasker
- Andrew Thomson
- Callum Jones
- Daniel Edozie
- Jamell Anderson
- Joe Ikhinmwin
- Kofi Josephs
- Michael Tuck (Captain)
- Orlan Jackman
- Robert Gilchrist
- Shane Walker

Pool B

Team	Pld	W	L	PF	PA	PD	Pts	Qualification
Scotland	3	3	0	237	198	+39	6	Qualifying finals
England	3	2	1	246	186	+60	5	Qualifying finals
Cameroon	3	1	2	202	231	−29	4	
India	3	0	3	222	292	−70	3	

5 April 2018
17:30

Boxscore

England	65–78	Scotland
Scoring by quarter: 19–17, 13–18, 16–14, 17–29
Pts: Walker 17; Rebs: Jackman 9 Asts: Jackman 5		Pts: Bunyah 18; Rebs: Fraser, Achara 8 Asts: Fraser, Achara 4

Townsville Entertainment and Convention Centre, Townsville
Referees: Matthew Beattie (USA), Kingsley Ojeaburu (UGR)

7 April 2018
17:30

Boxscore

England	100–54	India
Scoring by quarter: 19–15, 27–9, 29–11, 25–19
Pts: Thoseby 20; Rebs: Walker 8 Asts: Jones 6		Pts: Annadurai 22; Rebs: Y. Singh 7 Asts: At. Singh 5

Townsville Entertainment and Convention Centre, Townsville
Referees: Takaki Kato (JPN), Ryan Jones (NZL)

8 April 2018
14:00

Boxscore

Cameroon	54–81	England
Scoring by quarter: 15-20, 16-17, 14-29, 9-15
Pts: Bogmis 14; Rebs: Yangue 10; Asts: Essome 3		Pts: Josephs 26; Rebs: Jackman 8 Asts: Thoseby, Tuck 3

Townsville Entertainment and Convention Centre, Townsville
Referees: Leonardo Zalazar (ARG), Matthew Beattie (AUS)

Qualifying final

10 April 2018
20:00

Boxscore

Canada	97–79	England
Scoring by quarter: 30–12, 25–14, 22–32, 20–21
Pts: Morgan 24; Rebs: Pierre-Charles 8 Asts: Tutu, Diressa 4		Pts: Thoseby, Josephs 20; Rebs: Gilchrist, Josephs 8 Asts: Thoseby 4

Cairns Convention Centre, Cairns
Referees: Liszka (POL), Boyer (AUS)
Dodds (GBR)

=== Women's tournament ===
Roster

The following is the England roster in the women's basketball tournament of the 2018 Commonwealth Games.

England women's national basketball team - 2018 Commonwealth Games roster
Players
Coaches

Pos.	No.	Name	Age – Date of birth	Height	Club	Ctr.
G	1	Melita Emanuel-Carr	23 – 6 November 1994	1.78 m (5 ft 10 in)	CABC Basket	(France)
G	3	Nicolette Fong Lyew Quee	25 – 14 April 1992	1.65 m (5 ft 5 in)	Durham Palatinates	(England)
G	4	Siobhan Prior	31 – 27 February 1987	1.78 m (5 ft 10 in)	Nottingham Wildcats	(England)
G	6	Stefanie Collins	35 – 30 December 1982	1.68 m (5 ft 6 in)	Cardiff Archers	(Wales)
G	7	Rachael Vanderwal	34 – 27 June 1983	1.75 m (5 ft 9 in)	Universitario de Ferrol	(Spain)
G	8	Georgia Jones	28 – 3 April 1990	1.72 m (5 ft 8 in)	Manchester Mystics	(England)
C	9	Hannah Shaw	27 – 22 September 1990	1.93 m (6 ft 4 in)	Northumbria	(England)
G	10	Eilidh Simpson	25 – 11 September 1992	1.70 m (5 ft 7 in)	Cardiff Archers	(Wales)
F	11	Mollie Campbell	23 – 28 February 1995	1.83 m (6 ft 0 in)	Leicester Riders	(England)
F	12	Chantelle Pressley	27 – 25 May 1990	1.85 m (6 ft 1 in)	Sevenoaks Suns	(England)
C	13	Azania Stewart (C)	29 – 13 March 1989	1.96 m (6 ft 5 in)	TTT Riga	(Latvia)
F/C	20	Dominique Allen	28 – 10 September 1989	1.92 m (6 ft 4 in)	Manchester Mystics	(England)

Head coach

- (Spain) Jose Buceta

Assistant coach(es)

- (England) Chris Bunten
- (England) Vanessa Ellis

Legend

- (C) Team captain
- Club - describes last
  club before the tournament
- Age - describes age
  on 5 April 2018

Pool A

Pos	Team	Pld	W	L	PF	PA	PD	Pts	Qualification
1	Australia (H)	3	3	0	331	169	+162	6	Semi-finals
2	Canada	3	2	1	226	207	+19	5	Semi-finals
3	England	3	1	2	187	249	−62	4	Qualifying finals
4	Mozambique	3	0	3	157	276	−119	3	Qualifying finals

Source: GC2018
Rules for classification: 1) Points; 2) Head-to-head results; 3) Points difference; 4) Points scored.
(H) Hosts

6 April 2018
18:30

Boxscore

Canada	80–54	England
Scoring by quarter: 15–15, 26–17, 27–11, 12–11
Pts: Colley, Provo 14; Rebs: Kiss-Rusk 9 Asts: Nofuente 5		Pts: Jones 11; Rebs: Stewart 8 Asts: Jones 4

Townsville Entertainment and Convention Centre, Townsville
Referees: Snehal Bendke (IND), Jon Chapman (AUS), Sandy Ng (MAS)

8 April 2018
11:30

Boxscore

Mozambique	51–78	England
Scoring by quarter: 14–19, 13–17, 20–22, 4–20
Pts: Mafanela 13; Rebs: Mafanela 7 Asts: Cossa 6		Pts: Stewart 18; Rebs: Stewart 12; Asts: Jones 5

Townsville Entertainment and Convention Centre, Townsville
Referees: Jon Chapman (AUS), Joyce Muchenu (ZIM), Ho Shuet Mei (SGP)

9 April 2018
17:30

Boxscore

England	55–118	Australia
Scoring by quarter: 15–31, 9–30, 18–33, 13–24
Pts: three players 9 Rebs: Allen 7 Asts: Fong 4		Pts: Cambage 30; Rebs: George 10; Asts: Lavey 7

Townsville Entertainment and Convention Centre, Townsville
Referees: Takaki Kato (JPN), Kingsley Ojeaburu (NGR), Joyce Muchenu (ZIM)

Qualifying Final

10 April 2018
18:30

Boxscore

England	62–40	Jamaica
Scoring by quarter: 13–4, 13–9, 22–16, 14–11
Pts: Vanderwal 22; Rebs: Stewart 8 Asts: Collins 6		Pts: T. Gordon 14; Rebs: George 14; Asts: Smith 4

Townsville Entertainment and Convention Centre, Townsville
Referees: Leonardo Zalazar (ARG), Michael Weiland (CAN), Snehal Bendke (IND)

Semi-final

13 April 2018
18:30

Boxscore

Canada	53–65	England
Scoring by quarter: 14–16, 5–19, 19–19, 15–11
Pts: Hamblin 21; Rebs: Hamblin, Kiss-Rusk 10; Asts: Kiss-Rusk 3		Pts: Vanderwal 20; Rebs: Stewart 12; Asts: Vanderwal 6

Gold Coast Convention and Exhibition Centre, Gold Coast
Referees: Takaki Kato (JPN), Joyce Muchenu (ZIM), Snehal Bendke (IND)

Final

14 April 2018
20:30

Boxscore

Australia	99–55	England
Scoring by quarter: 26–10, 23–21, 29–16, 21–8
Pts: George, Griffin 16; Rebs: George 10; Asts: Ebzery 7		Pts: Stewart 13; Rebs: Emanuel-Carr, Vanderwal 5 Asts: Vanderwal 4

Gold Coast Convention and Exhibition Centre, Gold Coast
Referees: Christine Vuong (CAN), Ryan Jones (NZL), Viola Györgyi (NOR)

== Beach volleyball ==
England qualified both men's and women's teams based on the FIVB Beach Volleyball World Rankings as at 31 October 2017. On 23 November 2017, Commonwealth Games England announced the selection of the two pairs who will compete for England at the Games.

Athlete	Event	Preliminary round	Standing	Quarterfinals	Semifinals	Final / BM	
Athlete	Event	Opposition Score	Standing	Opposition Score	Opposition Score	Opposition Score	Rank
Chris Gregory; Jake Sheaf	Men's	O'Dea - O'Dea (NZL); L 1–2; Apostolou - Chrysostomou (CYP); W 2–0; Acacio - Soares (MOZ); W 2–0	2 Q	Miedzybrodski - Cook (SCO); W 2-0	McHugh - Schumann (AUS); L 0–2	O'Dea - O'Dea (NZL); L 0-2	4
Jessica Grimson; Victoria Palmer	Women's	Humana-Paredes - Pavan (CAN); L 0–2; Blackman - Grant (TTO); W 2–0; Ratudina - Nima (FIJ); W 2–0	2 Q	Matautu - Pata (VAN); L 1–2	Did not advance		

== Boxing ==
On 6 February 2018, Team England announced its squad of 12 boxers, 8 of which are male and 4 female.

Men

Athlete	Event	Round of 32	Round of 16	Quarterfinals	Semifinals	Final	
Athlete	Event	Opposition Result	Opposition Result	Opposition Result	Opposition Result	Opposition Result	Rank
Galal Yafai	Light flyweight	—N/a	Fotsala (CMR); W 5-0	Beedassee (MRI); W ABD	Ranasinghe (SRI); W RSC	Panghal (IND); W 3-1	1st place, gold medalist(s)
Peter McGrail	Bantamweight	—N/a	Njangiru (KEN); W RSC-I	Addo (GHA); W 5-0	Mohammed (IND); W 5-0	Walker (AUS); W 4-1	1st place, gold medalist(s)
Calum French	Lightweight	Bye	Ahmad (PAK); W 5-0	Kaushik (IND); L 0-5	Did not advance		
Luke McCormack	Light welterweight	Ssemujju (UGA); W 5–0	McComb (NIR); W 4-1	Wilson (AUS); W 5-0	Jonas (NAM); L 2-3	Did not advance	3rd place, bronze medalist(s)
Pat McCormack	Welterweight	Bye	Francois (GRN); W KO	Bwogi (UGA); W 5-0	Kumar (IND); W 5-0	Walsh (NIR); W 5-0	1st place, gold medalist(s)
Ben Whittaker	Middleweight	Bye	Ebanks (CAY); W 5-0	Docherty (SCO); L 1-4	Did not advance		
Cheavan Clarke	Heavyweight	—N/a	Bye	Forrest (SCO); W 4-0	Nyika (NZL); L 0-5	Did not advance	3rd place, bronze medalist(s)
Frazer Clarke	Super heavyweight	—N/a	Bye	Siutu (AUS); W 5-0	Mailata (NZL); W 3–2	Kumar (IND); W 5-0	1st place, gold medalist(s)

Women

Athlete	Event	Round of 16	Quarterfinals	Semifinals	Final	
Athlete	Event	Opposition Result	Opposition Result	Opposition Result	Opposition Result	Rank
Lisa Whiteside	Flyweight	—N/a	Rani (IND); W 3-2	Robertson (AUS); W 3-2	McNaul (NIR); W 5-0	1st place, gold medalist(s)
Paige Murney	Lightweight	Soma (PNG); W 5-0	Nihell (NIR); W 5-0	Odunuga (NGR); W 4-1	Stridsman (AUS); L 0-5	2nd place, silver medalist(s)
Sandy Ryan	Welterweight	Bye	Borgohain (IND); W 3-2	Parent (CAN); W 4-1	Eccles (WAL); W 3-2	1st place, gold medalist(s)
Natasha Gale	Middleweight	Bye	Parker (AUS); L 0-5	Did not advance		

== Cycling ==
On 6 March 2018, Team England announced its squad of 27 cyclists, of which 14 are male and 13 female.

=== Road ===
Athlete	Event	Time	Rank
Ian Bibby	Men's road race	3:57.12	12
Adam Blythe	Men's road race	DNF	
Christopher Latham	Men's road race	3:59.08	26
Tom Stewart	Men's road race	3:57.01	8
Harry Tanfield	Men's road race	3:59.39	42
Oliver Wood	Men's road race	DNF	
Eleanor Dickinson	Women's road race	3:03.32	14
Emily Kay	Women's road race	DNF	
Melissa Lowther	Women's road race	3:02.26	9
Emily Nelson	Women's road race	DNF	
Hayley Simmonds	Women's road race	3:02.29	10
Abigail Van Twisk	Women's road race	3:03.32	16
Ian Bibby	Men's time trial	50:43.88	9
Charlie Tanfield	Men's time trial	50:42.83	8
Harry Tanfield	Men's time trial	48:43.30	2nd place, silver medalist(s)
Hayley Simmonds	Women's time trial	36:22.09	3rd place, bronze medalist(s)

=== Track ===
Sprint

Athlete	Event	Qualification		Round 1	Quarterfinals	Semifinals	Final	
Athlete	Event	Time	Rank	Opposition Time	Opposition Time	Opposition Time	Opposition Time	Rank
Philip Hindes	Men's sprint	9.669	5 Q	Webster (NZL); L	Did not advance			
Ryan Owens	Men's sprint	9.662	4 Q	Paul (TTO); W	Webster (NZL); L	Did not advance		
Joseph Truman	Men's sprint	9.780	10 Q	Dawkins (NZL); W	Carlin (SCO); L	Did not advance		
Philip Hindes; Ryan Owens; Joseph Truman	Men's team sprint	43.516	2 QG	—N/a			New Zealand; L 43.547	2nd place, silver medalist(s)
Lauren Bate	Women's sprint	11.127	10 Q	Marchant (ENG); W	Genest (CAN); L 0-2	Did not advance		
Katy Marchant	Women's sprint	11.043	7 Q	Bate (ENG); L	Did not advance			
Lauren Bate; Katy Marchant	Women's team sprint	33.739	3 QB	—N/a			Wales; W 33.893	3rd place, bronze medalist(s)
Sophie Thornhill; Helen Scott (pilot)	Women's tandem sprint B	10.609 WR	1 QG	—N/a			Australia; W 2-0	1st place, gold medalist(s)

Keirin

Athlete	Event	Round 1	Repechage	Semifinals	Final
Philip Hindes	Men's keirin	3 R	3	Did not advance	
Ryan Owens	Men's keirin	4 R	1 Q	6	12 B
Joseph Truman	Men's keirin	1 Q	—N/a	5	10 B
Lauren Bate	Women's keirin	3 R	1 Q	6	Did not advance
Katy Marchant	Women's keirin	5	Did not advance		

Time trial

Athlete	Event	Time	Rank
Daniel Bigham	Men's time trial	1:02.691	15
Kian Emadi-Coffin	Men's time trial	1:02.079	12
Joseph Truman	Men's time trial	1:01.795	8
Lauren Bate	Women's time trial	34.546	5
Katy Marchant	Women's time trial	34.583	6
Sophie Thornhill; Helen Scott (pilot)	Women's tandem time trial B	1:04.623 WR	1st place, gold medalist(s)

Pursuit

Athlete	Event	Qualification		Final	
Athlete	Event	Time	Rank	Opponent Results	Rank
Daniel Bigham	Men's pursuit	4:17.174	6	Did not advance	
Ethan Hayter	Men's pursuit	4:17.477	8	Did not advance	
Charlie Tanfield	Men's pursuit	4:11.455 GR	1 QG	John Archibald (SCO); W 4:15.952	1st place, gold medalist(s)
Daniel Bigham; Kian Emadi-Coffin; Ethan Hayter; Charlie Tanfield; Oliver Wood	Men's team pursuit	3:55.359	2 QG	3:55.510	2nd place, silver medalist(s)
Eleanor Dickinson	Women's pursuit	3:37.616	13	Did not advance	
Emily Kay	Women's pursuit	3:37.501	12	Did not advance	
Emily Nelson	Women's pursuit	3:36.397	10	Did not advance	
Eleanor Dickinson; Emily Kay; Emily Nelson; Rebecca Raybould	Women's team pursuit	4:24.519	4 QB	4:24.499	4

Points race

Athlete	Event	Qualification		Final	
Athlete	Event	Points	Rank	Points	Rank
Ethan Hayter	Men's points race	25	1 Q	68	3rd place, bronze medalist(s)
Christopher Latham	Men's points race	8	7Q	50	5
Oliver Wood	Men's points race	28	1 Q	46	6
Eleanor Dickinson	Women's points race	—N/a		2	13
Emily Kay	Women's points race	—N/a		8	6
Emily Nelson	Women's points race	—N/a		5	9

Scratch race

Athlete	Event	Qualification	Final
Ethan Hayter	Men's scratch race	2	5
Christopher Latham	Men's scratch race	1	3rd place, bronze medalist(s)
Oliver Wood	Men's scratch race	2	4
Eleanor Dickinson	Women's scratch race	—N/a	6
Emily Kay	Women's scratch race	—N/a	3rd place, bronze medalist(s)
Emily Nelson	Women's scratch race	—N/a	21

=== Mountain bike ===
Athlete	Event	Time	Rank
Frazer Clacherty	Men's cross country	1:19.14	5
Annie Last	Women's cross country	1:18.02	1st place, gold medalist(s)
Evie Richards	Women's cross country	1:18.50	2nd place, silver medalist(s)

== Diving ==
On 5 February 2018, Team England announced its squad of 13 divers, 9 of which are male and 4 female.

Men

Athlete	Event	Preliminaries		Final	
Athlete	Event	Points	Rank	Points	Rank
Jack Haslam	1 m springboard	305.40	10 Q	325.05	10
Ross Haslam	1 m springboard	363.75	4 Q	368.85	8
Jack Laugher	1 m springboard	399.80	1 Q	438.00	1st place, gold medalist(s)
Jack Haslam	3 m springboard	329.70	12 Q	389.00	8
Ross Haslam	3 m springboard	404.10	3 Q	432.45	4
Jack Laugher	3 m springboard	396.40	5 Q	519.40	1st place, gold medalist(s)
Tom Daley	10 m platform	Withdrew			
Matthew Dixon	10 m platform	429.70	1 Q	449.55	2nd place, silver medalist(s)
Noah Williams	10 m platform	427.25	2 Q	405.85	4
Matty Lee	10 m platform	380.85	7 Q	341.20	11
Jack Laugher; Chris Mears	3 m synchronised springboard	—N/a		436.17	1st place, gold medalist(s)
Jack Haslam; Ross Haslam	3 m synchronised springboard	—N/a		395.31	5
Tom Daley; Daniel Goodfellow	10 m synchronised platform	—N/a		405.81	1st place, gold medalist(s)
Matthew Dixon; Noah Williams	10 m synchronised platform	—N/a		399.99	2nd place, silver medalist(s)

Women

Athlete	Event	Preliminaries		Final	
Athlete	Event	Points	Rank	Points	Rank
Alicia Blagg	1 m springboard	259.90	4 Q	228.55	7
Katherine Torrance	1 m springboard	259.55	5 Q	237.50	5
Alicia Blagg	3 m springboard	287.35	7 Q	282.40	8
Katherine Torrance	3 m springboard	305.85	4 Q	286.05	7
Robyn Birch	10 m platform	319.50	5 Q	308.40	8
Lois Toulson	10 m platform	324.60	4 Q	344.20	3rd place, bronze medalist(s)
Alicia Blagg; Katherine Torrance	3 m synchronised springboard	—N/a		276.90	2nd place, silver medalist(s)
Robyn Birch; Lois Toulson	10 m synchronised platform	—N/a		282.48	5

== Gymnastics ==
On 12 February 2018, Team England announced its squad of 3 rhythmic gymnasts. The initial 10-strong artistic gymnastics squad (5 men and 5 women) was added on 21 February 2018 and the current make-up is correct as of 28 March 2018.

=== Artistic ===
Men
Team Final & Individual Qualification

Athlete	Event	Apparatus						Total	Rank
Athlete	Event	F	PH	R	V	PB	HB	Total	Rank
Dominick Cunningham	Team	~~13.950~~	13.200	~~13.400~~	14.850 Q	13.500	13.600	82.500	3 R
James Hall	Team	14.050	13.950 Q	13.900	~~14.250~~	14.250 Q	14.450 Q	84.850	2 Q
Courtney Tulloch	Team	-	-	15.200 Q	14.850 Q	~~13.050~~	-	—N/a	
Max Whitlock	Team	14.800 Q	15.150 Q	-	-	-	-	—N/a	
Nile Wilson	Team	14.150 Q	~~12.900~~	14.750 Q	14.350	14.850 Q	15.100 Q	86.100	1 Q
Total	Team	43.000	42.300	43.850	44.050	42.600	43.150	258.950	1st place, gold medalist(s)

Individual Finals

Athlete	Event	Apparatus						Total	Rank
Athlete	Event	F	PH	R	V	PB	HB	Total	Rank
James Hall	All-around	13.550	13.550	14.200	14.525	14.050	14.100	83.975	2nd place, silver medalist(s)
Nile Wilson	All-around	13.800	12.600	14.500	14.350	14.600	15.100	84.950	1st place, gold medalist(s)

Athlete	Apparatus	Score	Rank
Max Whitlock	Floor	13.333	6
Nile Wilson	Floor	12.400	8
Max Whitlock	Pommel horse	15.100	2nd place, silver medalist(s)
James Hall	Pommel horse	14.066	5
Courtney Tulloch	Rings	14.833	1st place, gold medalist(s)
Nile Wilson	Rings	14.400	2nd place, silver medalist(s)
Dominick Cunningham	Vault	14.333	3rd place, bronze medalist(s)
Courtney Tulloch	Vault	14.666	2nd place, silver medalist(s)
James Hall	Parallel bars	14.100	5
Nile Wilson	Parallel bars	14.533	2nd place, silver medalist(s)
James Hall	Horizontal bar	14.000	2nd place, silver medalist(s)
Nile Wilson	Horizontal bar	14.533	1st place, gold medalist(s)

Women
Team Final & Individual Qualification

Athlete	Event	Apparatus				Total	Rank
Athlete	Event	V	UB	BB	F	Total	Rank
Georgia-Mae Fenton	Team	-	14.600 Q	12.450	-	—N/a	
Alice Kinsella	Team	13.900	13.350	13.350 Q	13.000 Q	53.600	3 Q
Kelly Simm	Team	13.950	13.750 Q	13.050 Q	12.850	53.600	2 Q
Lucy Stanhope	Team	14.300	-	~~10.350~~	~~11.500~~	—N/a	
Taeja James	Team	~~12.400~~	~~13.000~~	-	14.100 Q	—N/a	
Total	Team	42.150	41.700	38.850	39.950	162.650	2nd place, silver medalist(s)

Individual Finals

Athlete	Event	Apparatus				Total	Rank
Athlete	Event	V	UB	BB	F	Total	Rank
Alice Kinsella	All-around	14.050	13.400	13.150	12.550	53.150	3rd place, bronze medalist(s)
Kelly Simm	All-around	14.100	13.650	11.950	12.900	52.600	5

Athlete	Apparatus	Score	Rank
Georgia-Mae Fenton	Uneven bars	14.600	1st place, gold medalist(s)
Kelly Simm	Uneven bars	12.966	6
Alice Kinsella	Balance beam	13.700	1st place, gold medalist(s)
Kelly Simm	Balance beam	13.033	3rd place, bronze medalist(s)
Alice Kinsella	Floor	11.666	8
Taeja James	Floor	12.666	7

=== Rhythmic ===
Team Final & Individual Qualification

Athlete	Event	Apparatus				Total	Rank
Athlete	Event	Hoop	Ball	Clubs	Ribbon	Total	Rank
Mimi-Isabella Cesar	Team	11.050	10.950	~~9.100~~	~~10.050~~	41.150	19
Hannah Martin	Team	10.850	12.300 Q	10.100	10.450	43.700	16 Q
Stephani Sherlock	Team	11.250	11.050	10.450	10.050	42.800	17 Q
Total	Team	33.150	34.300	20.550	20.500	108.500	6

Individual Finals

Athlete	Event	Apparatus				Total	Rank
Athlete	Event	Hoop	Ball	Clubs	Ribbon	Total	Rank
Hannah Martin	All-around	13.250	12.000	12.250	11.850	49.350	7
Stephani Sherlock	All-around	9.500	10.850	10.350	10.700	41.400	14

Athlete	Apparatus	Score	Rank
Hannah Martin	Ball	12.500	5

== Hockey ==
England qualified both a men's and women's hockey team by placing in the top nine (excluding the host nation, Australia) among Commonwealth nations in the FIH World Rankings as of 31 October 2017. Each team consists of 18 athletes, for a total of 36.

The men's team was announced on 12 March 2018. Following an initial announcement on 15 March 2018, the women's team was confirmed on 20 March 2018.

Summary

Key:

- FT = After full time
- P = Match decided by penalty-shootout

Team	Event	Preliminary round					Semifinal	Final / BM / PM	
Team	Event	Opposition Result	Opposition Result	Opposition Result	Opposition Result	Rank	Opposition Result	Opposition Result	Rank
England men's	Men's tournament	Malaysia; W 7–0	Pakistan; D 2–2	Wales; W 3–2	India; L 3-4	2 Q	Australia; L 1–2	India; W 2–1	3rd place, bronze medalist(s)
England women's	Women's tournament	South Africa; W 2–0	Wales; W 5–1	India; L 1–2	Malaysia; W 3–0	1 Q	New Zealand; L 1–2^{P} FT: 0–0	India; W 6–0	3rd place, bronze medalist(s)

=== Men's tournament ===
Squad

- Liam Ansell
- David Condon
- Brendan Creed
- Adam Dixon
- James Gall
- Harry Gibson
- Mark Gleghorne
- David Goodfield
- Chris Griffiths
- Harry Martin
- Barry Middleton
- George Pinner
- Phil Roper
- Liam Sanford
- Ian Sloan
- Sam Ward
- Henry Weir
- Ollie Willars

Pool B

Pos	Team	Pld	W	D	L	GF	GA	GD	Pts	Qualification
1	India	4	3	1	0	12	9	+3	10	Advance to Semi-finals
2	England	4	2	1	1	15	8	+7	7	Advance to Semi-finals
3	Malaysia	4	1	1	2	5	10	−5	4	5th–6th place match
4	Pakistan	4	0	4	0	6	6	0	4	7th–8th place match
5	Wales	4	0	1	3	6	11	−5	1	9th–10th place match

Source: FIH
Rules for classification: 1) points; 2) number of wins; 3) goal difference; 4) goals scored; 5) head-to-head results.

6 April 2018
09:30

England	7–0	Malaysia
Ward 14', 20'; Goodfield 21'; Gleghorne 27', 53'; Martin 49'; Roper 59'	Report

Umpires:
Tim Bond (NZL)
Ben de Young (AUS)

8 April 2018
14:30

England	2–2	Pakistan
Gleghorne 34'; Ward 51'	Report	Md. Arslan 33'; Ali 57'

Umpires:
Ben de Young (AUS)
Sam Rapaport (RSA)

10 April 2018
14:30

England	3–2	Wales
Ward 38', 49', 57'	Report	Hawker 26'; Francis 30+'

Umpires:
Eric Koh (MAS)
Ben de Young (AUS)

11 April 2018
19:30

India	4–3	England
Manp. Singh 33'; R.P. Singh 51'; Kumar 59'; Mand. Singh 60'	Report	Condon 17'; Ansell 52'; Ward 56'

Umpires:
Sean Rapaport (RSA)
Rawi Anbananthan (MAS)

Semi-finals

13 April 2018
19:30

Australia	2–1	England
Mitton 1', 49'	Report	Sloan 37'

Umpires:
Sean Rapaport (RSA)
David Sweetman (SCO)

Bronze medal match

14 April 2018
19:00

England	2–1	India
Ward 7', 43'	Report	Kumar 27'

Umpires:
Rawi Anbananthan (MAS)
David Sweetman (SCO)

=== Women's tournament ===
Squad

- Giselle Ansley
- Grace Balsdon
- Sophie Bray
- Alex Danson
- Emily Defroand
- Sarah Haycroft
- Maddie Hinch
- Jo Hunter
- Kathryn Lane
- Hannah Martin
- Hollie Pearne-Webb
- Suzy Petty
- Ellie Rayer
- Amy Tennant
- Anna Toman
- Susannah Townsend
- Laura Unsworth
- Ellie Watton

Pool A

Pos	Team	Pld	W	D	L	GF	GA	GD	Pts	Qualification
1	England	4	3	0	1	11	3	+8	9	Advance to Semi-finals
2	India	4	3	0	1	9	5	+4	9	Advance to Semi-finals
3	South Africa	4	1	1	2	3	4	−1	4	5th–6th place match
4	Malaysia	4	1	1	2	3	8	−5	4	7th–8th place match
5	Wales	4	1	0	3	4	10	−6	3	9th–10th place match

Source: FIH
Rules for classification: 1) points; 2) number of wins; 3) goal difference; 4) goals scored; 5) head-to-head results.

5 April 2018
14:30

England	2–0	South Africa
Balsdon 11'; Townsend 20'	Report

Umpires:
Sarah Wilson (GBR)
Nur Hafizah Azman (MAS)

6 April 2018
19:30

England	5–1	Wales
Ansley 23'; Townsend 25'; Martin 48'; Bray 53'; Balsdon 60'	Report	Laity 34'

Umpires:
Lelia Sacre (CAN)
Ayanna McClean (TTO)

8 April 2018
09:30

England	1–2	India
Danson 1'	Report	Navn. Kaur 42'; G. Kaur 48'

Umpires:
Aleisha Neumann (AUS)
Cookie Tan (SGP)

9 April 2018
19:30

England	3–0	Malaysia
Watton 7'; Martin 35'; Bray 53'	Report

Umpires:
Lelia Sacre (CAN)
Wanri Venter (RSA)

Semi-finals

12 April 2018
19:00

England	0–0	New Zealand
	Report
Penalties
Danson (penalty shoot-out missed); Bray (penalty shoot-out missed); Martin (penalty shoot-out scored); Toman (penalty shoot-out missed); Pearne-Webb (penalty shoot-out missed)	1–2	(penalty shoot-out missed) Charlton; (penalty shoot-out missed) Thompson; (penalty shoot-out scored) Harrison; (penalty shoot-out missed) Gunson; (penalty shoot-out scored) Michelsen

Umpires:
Sarah Wilson (SCO)
Aleisha Neumann (AUS)

Bronze medal match

14 April 2018
10:30

England	6–0	India
Webb 27'; Bray 44', 49', 56'; Unsworth 55'; Danson 57'	Report

Umpires:
Aleisha Neumann (AUS)
Lelia Sacre (CAN)

== Lawn bowls ==
On 13 November 2017, Commonwealth Games England announced a full squad consisting of 15 bowlers, 9 of which are male and 6 female. Along with the other athletes, 2 directors were announced, Mark and Sue Wherry, who will assist the visually impaired athletes in the para-lawn bowls.

Men

Athlete	Event	Group Stage						Quarterfinal	Semifinal	Final / BM	
Athlete	Event	Opposition Score	Opposition Score	Opposition Score	Opposition Score	Opposition Score	Rank	Opposition Score	Opposition Score	Opposition Score	Rank
Robert Paxton	Singles	Kumar (FIJ); W 21-13	Xalxo (IND); W 21-19	Newell (JAM); L 16-21	McIlroy (NZL); W 21-18	Kimani (KEN); W 21-14	2 Q	McIlroy (NZL); W 21-16	Wilson (AUS); L 16-21	Burnett (SCO); W 21-14	3rd place, bronze medalist(s)
Louis Ridout; Sam Tolchard	Pairs	Cook Islands; L 13-15	Fiji; D 22-22	Papua New Guinea; W 28-14	Botswana; W 24-9	New Zealand; L 12-14	3	Did not advance			
David Bolt; Jamie Chestney; Robert Paxton	Triples	Papua New Guinea; W 24-6	India; W 15-14	South Africa; W 24-13	Wales; W 17-16	—N/a	1 Q	Norfolk Island; L 18-19	Did not advance		
David Bolt; Jamie Chestney; Louis Ridout; Sam Tolchard	Fours	Singapore; W 25-6	Brunei; W 18-4	Scotland; L 8-12	—N/a		2 Q	New Zealand; W 20-2	Scotland; L 10-18	Wales; W 15-9	3rd place, bronze medalist(s)

Women

Athlete	Event	Group Stage						Quarterfinal	Semifinal	Final / BM	
Athlete	Event	Opposition Score	Opposition Score	Opposition Score	Opposition Score	Opposition Score	Rank	Opposition Score	Opposition Score	Opposition Score	Rank
Katherine Rednall	Singles	Saroji (MAS); L 11-21	Pinki (IND); W 21-11	Edwards (NZL); W 21-17	Blumsky (NIU); W 21-19	Tikoisuva (FIJ); L 20-21	3	Did not advance			
Natalie Chestney; Sophie Tolchard	Pairs	Papua New Guinea; W 16-14	Malta; W 23-10	Zambia; W 30-5	Niue; W 29-8	Australia; L 14-20	2 Q	South Africa; L 12-14	Did not advance		
Ellen Falkner; Sian Honnor; Katherine Rednall	Triples	Northern Ireland; W 16-8	Niue; W 42-5	South Africa; W 28-11	—N/a		1 Q	Wales; W 16-11	Australia; L 13-16	Canada; W 20-12	3rd place, bronze medalist(s)
Natalie Chestney; Ellen Falkner; Sian Honnor; Sophie Tolchard	Fours	Malta; L 10-14	India; L 9-21	Fiji; W 19-11	Northern Ireland; L 14-15	—N/a	4	Did not advance			

Para-bowls

Athlete	Event	Group Stage						Semifinal	Final	
Athlete	Event	Opposition Score	Opposition Score	Opposition Score	Opposition Score	Opposition Score	Rank	Opposition Score	Opposition Score	Rank
Steve Simmons; Guide: Mark Wherry; Alison Yearling; Guide: Sue Wherry	Pairs	Scotland; L 6-16	Australia; W 17-16	Wales; L 11-21	South Africa; L 8-19	New Zealand; L 13-16	6	Did not advance		
Paul Brown; Mike Robertson; Kieran Rollings	Triples	South Africa; D 13-13	New Zealand; W 13-12	Australia; W 16-12	Scotland; W 18-10	Wales; L 13-15	2 Q	New Zealand; L 11-18	South Africa; L 13-16	4

== Netball ==
England qualified a netball team by virtue of being ranked in the top 11 (excluding the host nation, Australia) of the INF World Rankings on 1 July 2017.

The squad was announced on 14 February 2018.

Summary

Team	Event	Preliminary round						Semifinal	Final / BM / PM	
Team	Event	Opposition Result	Opposition Result	Opposition Result	Opposition Result	Opposition Result	Rank	Opposition Result	Opposition Result	Rank
England	Tournament	Scotland; W 74–28	Malawi; W 74–49	Uganda; W 55–49	Wales; W 85–31	New Zealand; W 54–45	1 Q	Jamaica; W 56–55	Australia; W 52–51	1st place, gold medalist(s)

The following is the England roster in the netball tournament of the 2018 Commonwealth Games.

England national netball team – 2018 Commonwealth Games roster
Players
Coaches

Pos.	Name	Age - DOB	Ht.	Club	Club nat.
GD, GK, WD	Ama Agbeze (C)	35 - 12 November 1982	1.84 m (6 ft 0 in)	Adelaide Thunderbirds	(Australia)
GK, GD	Eboni Beckford-Chambers	30 - 4 February 1988	1.85 m (6 ft 1 in)	Team Bath	(England)
C, WD, WA	Jade Clarke	34 - 17 October 1983	1.74 m (5 ft 9 in)	Wasps Netball	(England)
C, WD	Beth Cobden	25 - 3 February 1993	1.77 m (5 ft 10 in)	Loughborough Lightning	(England)
GS, GA	Kadeen Corbin	26 - 27 November 1991	1.77 m (5 ft 10 in)	Mainland Tactix	(New Zealand)
GD, WD	Jodie Gibson	25 - 30 October 1992	1.78 m (5 ft 10 in)	Severn Stars	(England)
C, WD	Serena Guthrie	28 - 5 January 1990	1.77 m (5 ft 10 in)	Giants Netball	(Australia)
GS, GA	Joanne Harten	29 - 21 March 1989	1.88 m (6 ft 2 in)	Giants Netball	(Australia)
WA, GA	Natalie Haythornthwaite	25 - 9 December 1992	1.74 m (5 ft 9 in)	Wasps Netball	(England)
GS, GA	Helen Housby	23 - 19 January 1995	1.84 m (6 ft 0 in)	New South Wales Swifts	(Australia)
GK, GD	Geva Mentor	33 - 17 September 1984	1.91 m (6 ft 3 in)	Sunshine Coast Lightning	(Australia)
WA	Chelsea Pitman	29 - 8 June 1988	1.81 m (5 ft 11 in)	Adelaide Thunderbirds	(Australia)

Head coach

Tracey Neville

Legend

- (C) Team captain
- Club field describes current pro club
- Injured

Pool B

Pos	Team	Pld	W	D	L	GF	GA	GD	Pts	Qualification
1	England	5	5	0	0	342	202	+140	10	Semi-finals
2	New Zealand	5	3	0	2	292	235	+57	6	Semi-finals
3	Uganda	5	3	0	2	287	248	+39	6	Classification matches
4	Malawi	5	3	0	2	277	284	−7	6	Classification matches
5	Scotland	5	1	0	4	195	289	−94	2	Classification matches
6	Wales	5	0	0	5	215	350	−135	0	Classification matches

Updated to match(es) played on 11 April 2018. Source: GC2018

5 April 2018
15:00

Report
England
74–28
Scotland

Gold Coast Convention and Exhibition Centre
Umpires: Kristie Simpson
Joshua Bowring
Reserve umpire: Michelle Phippard
Harten 40/43 (93%)
Corbin 17/18 (94%)
Housby 17/21 (81%)

Goodwin 15/19 (79%)
Gallagher 7/11 (64%)
McCall 4/7 (57%)
Pettitt 2/6 (33%)

6 April 2018
18:30

Report
Malawi
49–74
England

Gold Coast Convention and Exhibition Centre
Umpires: Marc Henning
Jono Bredin
Reserve umpire: Maria van der Merwe
Kumwenda 31/33 (94%)
Mvula 10/11 (91%)
Chimaliro 7/7 (100%)
Simtowe 1/3 (33%)

Harten 48/54 (89%)
Housby 14/18 (78%)
Corbin 6/7 (86%)
Haythornthwaite 6/7 (86%)

8 April 2018
15:00

Report
England
55–49
Uganda

Gold Coast Convention and Exhibition Centre
Umpires: Michelle Phippard
Marc Henning
Reserve umpire: Helen George
Housby 30/34 (88%)
Harten 11/11 (100%)
Corbin 7/10 (70%)
Haythornthwaite 7/7 (100%)

Proscovia 23/26 (88%)
Nanyonga 22/27 (81%)
Nakabuye 4/4 (100%)

9 April 2018
13:00

Report
England
85–31
Wales

Gold Coast Convention and Exhibition Centre
Umpires: Helen George
Theresa Prince
Reserve umpire: Lisa McPhail
Housby 34/36 (94%)
Harten 26/32 (81%)
Haythornthwaite 13/14 (93%)
Corbin 12/14 (86%)

Lewis 22/28 (79%)
Rowe 5/6 (83%)
Moseley 4/6 (67%)

11 April 2018
09:00

Report
New Zealand
45–54
England

Gold Coast Convention and Exhibition Centre
Umpires: Michelle Phippard
Marc Henning
Reserve umpire: Joshua Bowring
Folau 30/39 (77%)
Selby-Rickit 12/19 (63%)
Mes 3/4 (75%)

Housby 27/32 (84%)
Harten 27/31 (87%)

Semi-final

14 April 2018
15:00

Report
England
56–55
Jamaica

Coomera Indoor Sports Centre
Umpires: Marc Henning
Michelle Phippard
Reserve umpire: Joshua Bowring
Housby 29/35 (83%)
Harten 16/18 (89%)
Haythornthwaite 11/13 (85%)

Fowler-Reid 47/50 (94%)
Beckford 8/9 (89%)

Final

15 April 2018
13:00

Report
Australia
51–52
England

Coomera Indoor Sports Centre
Umpires: Lisa McPhail
Jono Bredin
Reserve umpire: Angela Armstrong-Lush
Bassett 22/24 (92%)
Wood 12/14 (86%)
Pettitt 11/12 (92%)
Thwaites 6/6 (100%)

Harten 34/39 (87%)
Housby 18/21 (86%)

== Rugby sevens ==
England qualified both men's and women's teams by finishing as one of the top nine Commonwealth Games Association sides in the 2016-17 World Rugby Sevens Series and as one of the top six sides at the 2016-17 World Rugby Women's Sevens Series respectively, as of 1 July 2017. Each team gets 12 players and a reserve.

The women's squad was announced on 26 March 2018. The men's squad was provisionally selected a few days later, although it was not officially announced until 3 April 2018.

Summary

Team	Event	Preliminary Round				Semifinal / CS	Final / BM / CF	
Team	Event	Opposition Result	Opposition Result	Opposition Result	Rank	Opposition Result	Opposition Result	Rank
England men's	Men's tournament	Jamaica; W 38–5	Samoa; W 33–0	Australia; W 26–17	1 Q	New Zealand; L 12–17	South Africa; W 21-14	3rd place, bronze medalist(s)
England women's	Women's tournament	Fiji; W 17–5	Australia; L 12–29	Wales; W 45–0	2 Q	New Zealand; L 5–26	Canada; W 24-19	3rd place, bronze medalist(s)

=== Men's tournament ===
Squad

- Alex Davis
- Tom Mitchell
- Dan Norton
- Dan Bibby
- Ethan Waddleton
- Harry Glover
- James Rodwell
- Mike Ellery
- Ollie Lindsay-Hague
- Phil Burgess
- Richard de Carpentier
- Ruaridh McConnochie
- Charles Hayter (reserve)

Pool B

Pos	Team	Pld	W	D	L	PF	PA	PD	Pts	Qualification
1	England	3	3	0	0	97	22	+75	9	Semi-finals
2	Australia	3	2	0	1	73	38	+35	7	Classification semi-finals
3	Samoa	3	1	0	2	43	64	−21	5	
4	Jamaica	3	0	0	3	17	106	−89	3	

Source: GC2018
Rules for classification: 1) Points; 2) Head-to-head result; 3) Point difference; 4) Points scored.

14 April 2018
9:53

England	38–5	Jamaica
Try: Mitchell (2) 1' m, 6' c Norton (2) 4' c, 12' m Glover 5' c Lindsay-Hague 8' c Con: Mitchell (3/4) 4', 5', 6'; Bibby (1/2) 8'	(Gold Goast 2018)	Try: Smith 10' m Con: Roy-Smith (0/1); Cards: Adamson (yellow card) 1' to 3'

Robina Stadium, Gold Coast
Referee: Jordan Way (Australia)

14 April 2018
13:33

England	33–0	Samoa
Try: Bibby (2) 2' m, 5' c Mitchell 3' c Glover 7' c Lindsay-Hague 10' c Con: Mitchell (4/5) 4', 5', 7', 11'	(Gold Coast 2018)

Robina Stadium, Gold Coast
Referee: Rasta Rasivhenge (South Africa)

14 April 2018
20:05

England	26–17	Australia
Try: Norton 3' m Davis (2) 7' c, 12' c McConnochie 8' c Con: Mitchell (2/3) 8', 12'; Bibby (1/1) 7'; Cards: Mitchell (yellow card) 4' to 6'	(Gold Coast 2018)	Try: Taylor 1' m Porch 5' c Connor 10' m Con: Lucas (1/2) 5'; Porch (0/1)

Robina Stadium, Gold Coast
Referee: Richard Kelly (New Zealand)

Semi-finals

15 April 2018
11:43

England	12–17	New Zealand
Try: Bibby 1' c Davis 6' m Con: Mitchell (1/2) 1'	(Gold Coast 2018)	Try: Ware (2) 3' m, 9' m Nanai-Seturo 7' c Con: Koroi (1/2) 7'; Knewstubb (0/1)

Robina Stadium, Gold Coast
Referee: Rasta Rasivhenge (South Africa)

Bronze medal match

15 April 2018
14:17

England	21–14	South Africa
Try: Burgess (2) 8' c, 11' c Mitchell 12' c Con: Mitchell (3/3) 8', 11', 12	(Gold Coast 2018)	Try: Du Preez 1' c Nel 6' c Con: Du Preez (2/2) 1', 6'

Robina Stadium, Gold Coast
Referee: Craig Evans (Wales)

=== Women's tournament ===
Squad

- Abbie Brown
- Claire Allan
- Lydia Thompson
- Emily Scarratt
- Natasha Hunt
- Deborah Fleming
- Heather Fisher
- Emily Scott
- Alex Matthews
- Megan Jones
- Jess Breach
- Amy Wilson-Hardy
- Victoria Fleetwood (reserve)

Pool B

Pos	Team	Pld	W	D	L	PF	PA	PD	Pts	Qualification
1	Australia	3	3	0	0	80	27	+53	9	Semi-finals
2	England	3	2	0	1	74	34	+40	7	Semi-finals
3	Fiji	3	1	0	2	44	41	+3	5	Classification semi-finals
4	Wales	3	0	0	3	12	108	−96	3	Classification semi-finals

Source: GC2018
Rules for classification: 1) Points; 2) Head-to-head result; 3) Point difference; 4) Points scored.

13 April 2018
17:15

Fiji	5–17	England
Try: Ravisa 6' m Con: Nagasau (0/1)	(Gold Coast 2018)	Try: Fleming 1' m Scarratt 11' c Thompson 13' m Con: Hunt (1/3) 11'

Robina Stadium, Gold Coast
Referee: Aimee Barrett-Theron (South Africa)

13 April 2018
20:17

Australia	29–12	England
Try: Tonegato 2' m Green 7' c Sykes 8' m Pelite 12' c Staples 14' m Con: Sykes (2/5) 7', 12'	(Gold Coast 2018)	Try: Brown 4' m Fleming 6' c Con: Hunt (1/2) 6'

Robina Stadium, Gold Coast
Referee: Alhambra Nievas (Spain)

13 April 2018
18:59

England	45–0	Wales
Try: Fleming 1' c Hunt (2) 2' c, 6' m Scarratt 4' c Scott 8' c Wilson-Hardy (2) 9' m, 14' c Con: Hunt (3/5) 1', 2', 4'; Scott (2/2) 8', 14'	(Gold Coast 2018)	Cards: Powell Hughes (yellow card) 12' to 14'

Robina Stadium, Gold Coast
Referee: Aimee Barrett-Theron (South Africa)

Semi-finals

15 April 2018	New Zealand	26–5	England	Gold Coast
11:21

Bronze medal match

15 April 2018	Canada	19–24	England	Gold Coast
13:55

== Shooting ==
On 6 December 2017, Team England announced the majority of its 21-strong squad (13 men and 8 women). Another shooter was added at a later date.

Men
Pistol/Small bore

Athlete	Event	Qualification		Final	
Athlete	Event	Points	Rank	Points	Rank
Kristian Callaghan	10 m air pistol	562 -11x	10	Did not advance	
Kristian Callaghan	25 m rapid fire pistol	561 -12x	8	Did not advance	
Sam Gowin	25 m rapid fire pistol	568 -11x	5 Q	17	3rd place, bronze medalist(s)
Kristian Callaghan	50 m pistol	541 -5x	7 Q	181.4	4
Dean Bale	10 m air rifle	615.1	8 Q	141.9	7
David Binney	50 m rifle prone	610.3	10	Did not advance	
Ken Parr	50 m rifle prone	612.7	8 Q	226.6	3rd place, bronze medalist(s)
Dean Bale	50 m rifle 3 positions	1163 -55x	3 Q	441.2	3rd place, bronze medalist(s)
Ken Parr	50 m rifle 3 positions	1158 -62x	4 Q	406.7	6

Shotgun

Athlete	Event	Qualification		Final	
Athlete	Event	Points	Rank	Points	Rank
Jack Fairclough	Skeet	122 +3	3 Q	26	5
Freddie Killander	Skeet	119 +7	5 Q	37	4
Aaron Heading	Trap	119 +3	2Q	43	2nd place, silver medalist(s)
Ed Ling	Trap	119 +2	3 Q	28	4
Matt French	Double trap	130	8	Did not advance	
Steve Scott	Double trap	124	13	Did not advance	

Women
Pistol/Small bore

Athlete	Event	Qualification		Final	
Athlete	Event	Points	Rank	Points	Rank
Victoria Mullin	10 metre air pistol	368-12x	12	Did not advance	
Katie Gleeson	10 m air rifle	405.8	14	Did not advance	
Katie Gleeson	50 m rifle prone	—N/a		607.8	12
Lina Jones	50 m rifle prone	—N/a		615.7	4
Katie Gleeson	50 m rifle 3 positions	573 -17x	8 Q	420.2	5

Shotgun

Athlete	Event	Qualification		Final	
Athlete	Event	Points	Rank	Points	Rank
Emily Hibbs	Skeet	69 +7	5 QF	24	5
Amber Hill	Skeet	69 +8	4 QF	49	2nd place, silver medalist(s)
Abbey Ling	Trap	69+1	2 Q	24	4
Ellie Seward	Trap	63	9	Did not advance	
Rachel Parish	Double trap	—N/a		83	6

Open
Queen's Prize (full bore)

Athlete	Event	Day 1	Day 2	Day 3	Total	
Athlete	Event	Points	Points	Points	Points	Rank
David Luckman	Individual	105- 13v	150- 19v	149- 17v	404- 49v GR	1st place, gold medalist(s)
Parag Patel	Individual	105- 10v	149- 22v	149- 13v	403- 45v	3rd place, bronze medalist(s)
David Luckman; Parag Patel	Pairs	299- 39v	285- 22v	—N/a	584- 61v	1st place, gold medalist(s)

== Squash ==
On 16 February 2018, Team England announced its squad of 9 players, consisting of 5 men and 4 women.

Singles

Athlete	Event	Round of 64	Round of 32	Round of 16	Quarterfinals	Semifinals	Final	Rank
Athlete	Event	Opposition Score	Opposition Score	Opposition Score	Opposition Score	Opposition Score	Opposition Score	Rank
Nick Matthew (1)	Men's singles	Bye	Rukunya (UGA); W 3–0	Malhotra (IND); W 3-1	Adnan (MAS); L 2-3	Did not advance		
James Willstrop (4)	Men's singles	Bye	Zaman (PAK); W 3–0	Grayson (NZL); W 3-1	Pilley (AUS); W 3-2	Adnan (MAS); W 3-0	Coll (NZL); W 3–0	1st place, gold medalist(s)
Daryl Selby (5)	Men's singles	Bye	Kawooya (UGA); W 3–0	Lobban (SCO); W 3-1	Coll (NZL); L 1-3	Did not advance		
Laura Massaro (1)	Women's singles	Bye	Haywood (BAR); W 3–0	Landers-Murphy (NZL); W 3-0	Evans (WAL); L 1-3	Did not advance		
Sarah-Jane Perry (4)	Women's singles	Bye	Mua (FIJ); W 3–0	Todd (CAN); W 3-0	Urquhart (AUS); W 3–1	Evans (WAL); W 3-0	King (NZL); L 2-3	2nd place, silver medalist(s)
Alison Waters (5)	Women's singles	Bye	Best (BAR); W 3–0	Pallikal Karthik (IND); W 3-0	David (MAS); L 2-3	Did not advance		

Doubles

Athletes	Event	Group Stage				Round of 16	Quarterfinal	Semifinal	Final	Rank
Athletes	Event	Opposition Score	Opposition Score	Opposition Score	Rank	Opposition Score	Opposition Score	Opposition Score	Opposition Score	Rank
Declan James & James Willstrop (4)	Men's doubles	Chapman & Sorrentino (IVB); W 2-0	Aslam & Zaman (PAK); W 2-0	—N/a	1 Q	Hindle & Zammit-Lewis (MLT); W 2-0	Malhotra & Tandon (IND); W 2-1	Selby & Waller (ENG); L 1-2	Bronze medal match Clyne & Lobban (SCO); W 2-0	3rd place, bronze medalist(s)
Daryl Selby & Adrian Waller (7)	Men's doubles	Kawooya & Rukunya (UGA); W 2-0	Kamal & Yow (MAS); W 2-0	—N/a	1 Q	Beddoes & Williams (NZL); W 2-0	Cuskelly & Cameron Pilley (AUS); W 2-1	James & Willstrop (ENG); W 2-1	Alexander & Palmer (AUS); L 1-2	2nd place, silver medalist(s)
Jenny Duncalf & Alison Waters (2)	Women's doubles	Aitken & Thomson (SCO); W 2-0	Massaro & Perry (ENG); W 2-0	Bridgeman & Laing (CAY); W 2-0	1 Q	—N/a	King & Landers-Murphy (NZL); L 0-2	Did not advance		
Laura Massaro & Sarah-Jane Perry (7)	Women's doubles	Bridgeman & Laing (CAY); W 2-0	Duncalf & Waters (ENG); L 0-2	Aitken & Thomson (SCO); W 2-1	2 Q	—N/a	Arnold & Subramaniam (MAS); W 2-0	Chinappa & Pallikal Karthik (IND); L 0-2	Bronze medal match Grinham & Urquhart (AUS); L 0-2	4
Alison Waters & Daryl Selby (2)	Mixed doubles	Mua & Henry (FIJ); W 2-0	Best & Simpson (BAR); W 2-0	—N/a	1 Q	Kellis & Hindle (MLT); W 2-0	Duncalf & Waller (ENG); W 2-1	Urquhart & Pilley (AUS); L 1-2	Bronze medal match King & Coll (NZL); L 0-2	4
Jenny Duncalf & Adrian Waller (7)	Mixed doubles	Landers-Murphy & Millar (NZL); W 2-1	Sultana & Zammit-Lewis (MLT); W 2-0	—N/a	1 Q	Aitken & Moran (SCO); W 2-0	Waters & Selby (ENG); L 1-2	Did not advance		

== Swimming ==
Team England announced its squad in two tranches.

The first tranche of 15 swimmers was announced on 4 October 2017. After the Swim England National Winter Championships, a second tranche of 24 swimmers was announced on 5 January 2018.

Jonathan Fox and Oliver Hynd have since withdrawn after their recent reclassifications by the IPC.

=== Men ===
Athlete	Event	Heat		Semifinal		Final	
Athlete	Event	Time	Rank	Time	Rank	Time	Rank
David Cumberlidge	50 m freestyle	22.25	7 Q	22.15	6 Q	22.00	4
Thomas Fannon	50 m freestyle	22.12	5 Q	22.09	4= Q	22.25	8
Ben Proud	50 m freestyle	21.45 GR	1 Q	21.30 GR NR	1 Q	21.35	1st place, gold medalist(s)
David Cumberlidge	100 m freestyle	49.77	13 Q	49.90	16	Did not advance	
Elliot Clogg	100 m freestyle	50.56	23	Did not advance			
Lewis White	100 m freestyle S9	56.83	2 Q	—N/a		56.77	2nd place, silver medalist(s)
Nicholas Grainger	200 m freestyle	1:48.72	11	—N/a		Did not advance	
James Guy	200 m freestyle	1:47.04	2 Q	—N/a		1:46.40	4
Cameron Kurle	200 m freestyle	1:48.96	13	—N/a		Did not advance	
Thomas Hamer	200 m freestyle S14	2:01.08	4 Q	—N/a		1:55.88 WR	1st place, gold medalist(s)
Nicholas Grainger	400 m freestyle	DNS		—N/a		Did not advance	
James Guy	400 m freestyle	3:50.23	5 Q	—N/a		3:45.42	3rd place, bronze medalist(s)
Elliot Clogg	100 m backstroke	55.08	5 Q	55.42	11	Did not advance	
Luke Greenbank	100 m backstroke	54.62	2 Q	54.54	5 Q	54.37	4
Lewis White	100 m backstroke S9	1:07.38	5 Q	—N/a		1:07.25	6
Jacob Leach	100 m backstroke S9	1:07.81	6 Q	—N/a		1:06.59	5
Luke Greenbank	200 m backstroke	1:58.54	4 Q	—N/a		1:57.43	4
Adam Peaty	50 m breaststroke	26.98	1 Q	26.49 GR	1 Q	26.62	2nd place, silver medalist(s)
James Wilby	50 m breaststroke	27.58	5 Q	27.41	3 Q	27.37	3rd place, bronze medalist(s)
Adam Peaty	100 m breaststroke	59.14	1 Q	58.59 GR	1 Q	58.84	1st place, gold medalist(s)
James Wilby	100 m breaststroke	59.80	2 Q	59.69	2 Q	59.43	2nd place, silver medalist(s)
Andrew Willis	100 m breaststroke	1:01.13	7 Q	1:01.29	8 Q	1:01.13	8
Jacob Leach	100 m breaststroke SB8	1:26.17	6 Q	—N/a		1:25.35	5
Andrew Willis	200 m breaststroke	2:10.52	4 Q	—N/a		2:09.31	4
James Wilby	200 m breaststroke	2:10.07	3 Q	—N/a		2:08.05	1st place, gold medalist(s)
Ben Proud	50 m butterfly	DSQ		Did not advance			
Jacob Peters	50 m butterfly	24.19	6 Q	24.05	7 Q	24.00	7
James Guy	100 m butterfly	53.16	1 Q	52.34	2 Q	51.31	2nd place, silver medalist(s)
Jacob Peters	100 m butterfly	53.72	6 Q	53.40	6 Q	53.11	6
James Guy	200 m butterfly	1:58.43	8 Q	—N/a		DNS	
Jacob Peters	200 m butterfly	1:58.42	7 Q	—N/a		1:57.75	5
Joe Litchfield	200 m individual medley	2:01.78	10	—N/a		Did not advance	
Jarvis Parkinson	200 m individual medley	2:02.35	18	—N/a		Did not advance	
Joe Litchfield	400 m individual medley	4:21.31	8 Q	—N/a		4:19.41	6
David Cumberlidge; Jarvis Parkinson; James Guy; Ben Proud; Elliot Clogg; Cameron Kurle	4 × 100 m freestyle relay	3:17.99	4 Q	—N/a		3:15.25	2nd place, silver medalist(s)
James Guy; Nicholas Grainger; Cameron Kurle; Jarvis Parkinson	4 × 200 m freestyle relay	—N/a				7:08.47	2nd place, silver medalist(s)
James Guy; Luke Greenbank; Adam Peaty; Ben Proud; Elliot Clogg; James Wilby; Jacob Peters; David Cumberlidge	4 × 100 m medley relay	3:36.68	2 Q	—N/a		3:31.13	2nd place, silver medalist(s)

=== Women ===
Athlete	Event	Heat		Semifinal		Final	
Athlete	Event	Time	Rank	Time	Rank	Time	Rank
Anna Hopkin	50 m freestyle	25.29	6 Q	25.33	7 Q	25.28	7
Jessica Jackson	50 m freestyle	26.01	12 Q	26.08	13	Did not advance	
Freya Anderson	100 m freestyle	55.12	7 Q	55.28	9	Did not advance	
Anna Hopkin	100 m freestyle	55.21	8 Q	55.17	8 Q	55.03	8
Jessica Jackson	100 m freestyle	55.85	11 Q	55.84	11	Did not advance	
Alice Tai	100 m freestyle S9	1:06.88	4 Q	—N/a		1:03.07	2nd place, silver medalist(s)
Freya Anderson	200 m freestyle	DNS		—N/a		Did not advance	
Ellie Faulkner	200 m freestyle	1:57.87	4 Q	—N/a		1:57.72	4
Holly Hibbott	200 m freestyle	1:58.10	5 Q	—N/a		1:58.55	5
Ellie Faulkner	400 m freestyle	4:11.19	2 Q	—N/a		4:07.35	3rd place, bronze medalist(s)
Holly Hibbott	400 m freestyle	4:11.65	3 Q	—N/a		4:05.31	2nd place, silver medalist(s)
Holly Hibbott	800 m freestyle	8:39.57	5 Q	—N/a		8:29.05	4
Anna Maine	50 m backstroke	29.29	14 Q	29.33	14	Did not advance	
Jessica Fullalove	100 m backstroke	1:01.04	8 Q	1:01.39	11	Did not advance	
Anna Maine	100 m backstroke	1:02.63	14 Q	1:02.29	13	Did not advance	
Elizabeth Simmonds	100 m backstroke	1:00.49	3 Q	1:00.69	8=	Did not advance	
Alice Tai	100 m backstroke S9	109.63	1 Q	—N/a		1:08.77	1st place, gold medalist(s)
Jessica Fullalove	200 m backstroke	2:11.51	4 Q	—N/a		2:11.74	7
Chloe Golding	200 m backstroke	2:13.05	9	—N/a		Did not advance	
Elizabeth Simmonds	200 m backstroke	2:12.12	6 Q	—N/a		2:12.40	8
Molly Renshaw	50 m breaststroke	32.22	16 Q	32.18	15	Did not advance	
Jocelyn Ulyett	50 m breaststroke	32.14	13 Q	31.96	11	Did not advance	
Sarah Vasey	50 m breaststroke	30.77	1 Q	30.75	2 Q	30.60	1st place, gold medalist(s)
Molly Renshaw	100 m breaststroke	1:09.40	10 Q	1:09.22	11	Did not advance	
Jocelyn Ulyett	100 m breaststroke	1:09.74	14 Q	1:08.68	10	Did not advance	
Sarah Vasey	100 m breaststroke	1:08.98	8 Q	1:08.50	7 Q	1:08.36	7
Molly Renshaw	200 m breaststroke	2:25.55	2 Q	—N/a		2:23.28	2nd place, silver medalist(s)
Jocelyn Ulyett	200 m breaststroke	2:29.54	12	—N/a		Did not advance	
Eleanor Robinson	50 m butterfly S7	36.38	1 Q	—N/a		35.71	1st place, gold medalist(s)
Emily Large	100 m butterfly	1:00.46	16 Q	59.96	12	Did not advance	
Laura Stephens	100 m butterfly	59.68	12 Q	1:00.89	15	Did not advance	
Emily Large	200 m butterfly	2:11.36	8 Q	—N/a		2:10.96	7
Laura Stephens	200 m butterfly	2:11.18	7 Q	—N/a		2:11.46	8
Aimee Willmott	200 m butterfly	2:12..40	12	—N/a		Did not advance	
Siobhan-Marie O'Connor	200 m individual medley	2:11.31	1 Q	—N/a		2:09.80	1st place, gold medalist(s)
Aimee Willmott	200 m individual medley	2:13.38	6 Q	—N/a		2:12.07	4
Abbie Wood	200 m individual medley	2:12.85	4 Q	—N/a		2:13.72	7
Rosie Rudin	400 m individual medley	4:47.50	10	—N/a		Did not advance	
Aimee Willmott	400 m individual medley	4:39.19	2 Q	—N/a		4:34.90	1st place, gold medalist(s)
Abbie Wood	400 m individual medley	4:44.39	8 Q	—N/a		4:40.35	6
Freya Anderson; Ellie Faulkner; Anna Hopkin; Siobhan-Marie O'Connor	4 × 100 m freestyle relay	—N/a				3:38.40	3rd place, bronze medalist(s)
Freya Anderson; Ellie Faulkner; Holly Hibbott; Siobhan-Marie O'Connor	4 × 200 m freestyle relay	—N/a				7:55.60	3rd place, bronze medalist(s)
Anna Hopkin; Siobhan-Marie O'Connor; Elizabeth Simmonds; Sarah Vasey	4 × 100m medley relay	—N/a				4:01.67	4

Qualifiers for the latter rounds (Q) of all events were decided on a time only basis, therefore positions shown are overall results versus competitors in all heats.
Relay competitors named in italics did not participate in the corresponding finals.

== Table tennis ==
On 7 February 2018, Team England announced its squad of 11 players, 6 of which are male and 5 female.

Singles

Athletes	Event	Group Stage			Round of 64	Round of 32	Round of 16	Quarterfinal	Semifinal	Final	Rank
Athletes	Event	Opposition Score	Opposition Score	Rank	Opposition Score	Opposition Score	Opposition Score	Opposition Score	Opposition Score	Opposition Score	Rank
Paul Drinkhall	Men's singles	Bye			Bye	Robinson (NIR); W 4-0	Wang (CAN); L 2-4	Did not advance			
Liam Pitchford	Men's singles	Bye			Bye	Abiodun (NGR); W 4-1	Rumgay (SCO); W 4-1	Kamal (IND); L 2-4	Did not advance		
Sam Walker	Men's singles	Bye			Bye	Bernadet (CAN); W 4-0	McCreery (NIR); W 4-0	Gnanasekaran (IND); W 4-0	Gao (SGP); L 0-4	Bronze medal match Kamal (IND); L 1-4	4
Tin-Tin Ho	Women's singles	Bye			—N/a	Kapugeekiyana (SRI); W 4-0	Das (IND); L 3-4	Did not advance			
Denise Payet	Women's singles	Kinoo (MRI); W 4-0	Madurangi (SRI); W 4-1	1 Q	—N/a	Yee (FIJ); W 4-0	Zhang (CAN); L 0-4	Did not advance			
Kelly Sibley	Women's singles	Bye			—N/a	Cote (CAN); W 4-0	Patkar (IND); W 4-2	Feng (SGP); L 0-4	Did not advance		

Doubles

Athletes	Event	Round of 64	Round of 32	Round of 16	Quarterfinal	Semifinal	Final	Rank
Athletes	Event	Opposition Score	Opposition Score	Opposition Score	Opposition Score	Opposition Score	Opposition Score	Rank
Paul Drinkhall; Liam Pitchford	Men's doubles	Bye	Abrefa & Lartey (GHA); W 3-0	Abiodun & Omatayo (NGR); W 3-0	Gao & Pang (SGP); W 3-2	Desai & Shetty (IND); W 3-0	Kamal & Gnanasekaran (IND); W 3-2	1st place, gold medalist(s)
David McBeath; Sam Walker	Men's doubles	Bye	Terry & Hukmani (BIZ); W 3-0	Howieson & Rumgay (SCO); W 3-0	Kamal & Gnanasekaran (IND); L 0-3	Did not advance		
Denise Payet; Kelly Sibley	Women's doubles	—N/a	Bye	Cote & Zhang (CAN); L 1-3	Did not advance			
Tin-Tin Ho; Maria Tsaptsinos	Women's doubles	—N/a	Bye	Lulu & Tommy (VAN); W 3-0	Batra & Das (IND); L 1-3	Did not advance		
Kelly Sibley; David McBeath	Mixed doubles	Bye	Muhamad Rizal & Tee (MAS); W 3-0	Kamal & Das (IND); L 0-3	Did not advance			
Tin-Tin Ho; Liam Pitchford	Mixed doubles	Bye	Beh & Zhang (SGP); W 3-1	Carter & Feng (AUS); W 3-0	Shetty & Patkar (IND); W 3-2	Gnanasekaran & Batra (IND); W 3-2	Gao & Yu (SGP); L 0-3	2nd place, silver medalist(s)
Denise Payet; Sam Walker	Mixed doubles	Nuopula & Sifi (SOL); W 3-0	Bristol & Sultan (SEY); W 3-0	Choong & Lyne (MAS); W 3-0	Gao & Yu (SGP); L 0-3	Did not advance		

Team

Athletes	Event	Group Stage			Round of 16	Quarterfinal	Semifinal	Final	Rank
Athletes	Event	Opposition Score	Opposition Score	Rank	Opposition Score	Opposition Score	Opposition Score	Opposition Score	Rank
Paul Drinkhall; David McBeath; Liam Pitchford; Sam Walker	Men's team	Ghana; W 3–0	Guyana; W 3-0	1 Q	Bye	Northern Ireland; W 3-0	Nigeria; L 2-3	Bronze medal match Singapore; W 3-0	3rd place, bronze medalist(s)
Tin-Tin Ho; Denise Payet; Kelly Sibley; Maria Tsaptsinos	Women's team	Guyana; W 3-0	Vanuatu; W 3-0	1 Q	—N/a	Canada; W 3-1	India; L 0-3	Bronze medal match Australia; W 3-1	3rd place, bronze medalist(s)

Para-sport

Athletes	Event	Group Stage				Semifinal	Final	Rank
Athletes	Event	Opposition Score	Opposition Score	Opposition Score	Rank	Opposition Score	Opposition Score	Rank
Kim Daybell	Men's TT6–10	Stacey (WAL); W 3-2	Bakar (MAS); W 3-1	Kent (CAN); W 3-0	1 Q	Cogill (RSA); W 3-2	Wilson (ENG); L 1-3	2nd place, silver medalist(s)
Ross Wilson	Men's TT6–10	Mizrachi (AUS); W 3-0	Cogill (RSA); W 3-2	Ogunsanya (NGR); W 3-0	1 Q	Stacey (WAL); W 3-1	Daybell (ENG); W 3-1	1st place, gold medalist(s)
Felicity Pickard	Women's TT6–10	Nime (PNG); W 3-0	Tapper (AUS); L 0-3	Sarkar (IND); W 3-0	2 Q	Obazuaye (NGR); L 0-3	Bronze medal match McConnell (AUS); L 0-3	4

== Triathlon ==
On 29 November 2017, Team England announced its squad of 10 triathletes, consisting of 5 men and 5 women.

Individual

Athlete	Event	Swim (1.5 km)	Trans 1	Bike (43 km)	Trans 2	Run (10 km)	Total	Rank
Tom Bishop	Men's	8:59	0:37	29:19	0:31	16:49	56:15	19
Alistair Brownlee	Men's	8:48	0:34	27:44	0:26	16:05	53:37	10
Jonathan Brownlee	Men's	8:51	0:34	27:41	0:25	15:38	53:09	7
Sophie Coldwell	Women's	9:17	0:35	30:44	0:26	17:17	58:19	6
Vicky Holland	Women's	9:47	0:37	30:11	0:33	16:34	57:42	4
Jess Learmonth	Women's	9:04	0:39	29:40	0:30	17:40	57:33	2nd place, silver medalist(s)

Mixed Relay

Athletes	Event	Total Times per Athlete (Swim 250 m, Bike 6 km, Run 1.6 km)	Total Group Time	Rank
Vicky Holland; Jonathan Brownlee; Jessica Learmonth; Alistair Brownlee	Mixed relay	19:51; 18:20; 21:07; 19:10	1:18:28	2nd place, silver medalist(s)

Paratriathlon

Athlete	Event	Comp.	Swim (1.5 km)	Trans 1	Bike (43 km)	Trans 2	Run (10 km)	Total	Rank
Mark Conway	Men's PTWC	0:00	12:00	1:37	38:23	0:47	13:30	1:06:17	4
Joe Townsend	Men's PTWC	3:00	12:32	1:08	31:55	0:36	13:28	1:02:39	1st place, gold medalist(s)
Jade Jones	Women's PTWC	3:58	13:10	1:22	38:05	0:53	13:39	1:11:07	1st place, gold medalist(s)
Lizzie Tench	Women's PTWC	3:58	14:10	2:01	41:58	1:18	16:39	1:20:04	5

== Weightlifting ==
On 12 January 2018, Team England announced its squad of 18 weightlifters and powerlifters, 8 of which are male and 10 female.

Men

Athlete	Event	Weight lifted		Total	Rank
Athlete	Event	Snatch	Clean & jerk	Total	Rank
Jack Oliver	77 kg	145	167	312	2nd place, silver medalist(s)
Alex Collier	85 kg	130	160	290	10
Edmon Avetisyan	94 kg	150	190	340	4
Owen Boxall	105 kg	152	199	351	3rd place, bronze medalist(s)
Ben Watson	+105 kg	160	192	352	6

Women

Athlete	Event	Weight lifted		Total	Rank
Athlete	Event	Snatch	Clean & jerk	Total	Rank
Kelly-Jo Robson	48 kg	65	86	151	6
Fraer Morrow	53 kg	73	99	172	5
Laura Hewitt	58 kg	84	98	182	4
Zoe Smith	63 kg	92	115	207	2nd place, silver medalist(s)
Sarah Davies	69 kg	95	122	217	2nd place, silver medalist(s)
Emily Godley	75 kg	96	126	222	1st place, gold medalist(s)
Emily Campbell	+90 kg	103	139	242	3rd place, bronze medalist(s)

=== Powerlifting ===
Athlete	Event	Total lifted	Factored weight	Rank
Oliver Brown	Men's lightweight	164.2	64.80	6
Ali Jawad	Men's lightweight	182.7	52.50	3rd place, bronze medalist(s)
Nathaniel Wilding	Men's heavyweight	168.9	72.20	5
Natalie Blake	Women's lightweight	77.4	54.80	6
Zoe Newson	Women's lightweight	106.1	41.00	3rd place, bronze medalist(s)
Louise Sugden	Women's heavyweight	89.2	79.80	2nd place, silver medalist(s)

== Wrestling ==
On 13 February 2018, Team England announced its squad of 5 wrestlers, which consists of 4 men and 1 woman.

Men

Athlete	Event	Round of 16	Quarterfinal	Semifinal	Repechage	Final / BM	
Athlete	Event	Opposition Result	Opposition Result	Opposition Result	Opposition Result	Opposition Result	Rank
George Ramm	−57 kg	Aware (IND); L 0–11	Did not advance		Cicchini (AUS); W 11–0	Bilal (PAK); L 1–6	5
Charlie Bowling	−65 kg	—N/a	Chang (WAL); L 0–10	Did not advance	—N/a	Bandou (MRI); W 10–0	3rd place, bronze medalist(s)
Syerus Eslami	−86 kg	Inouyesi (KEN); W 12–2	Fitzpatrick (NZL); W 9–8	Bibo (NGR); L 0–10	Bye	Conteh (SLE); W 11–0	3rd place, bronze medalist(s)
Leon Rattigan	−97 kg	Steen (CAN); L 0–10	Did not advance				

Women

Athlete	Event	Quarterfinal	Semifinal	Final / BM	
Athlete	Event	Opposition Result	Opposition Result	Opposition Result	Rank
Georgina Nelthorpe	−76 kg	De Bruine (AUS); W 3–1	Wiebe (CAN); L 0–11	Kamara (SLE); W 10–0	3rd place, bronze medalist(s)
