= Basketball at the 2018 Commonwealth Games – Women's tournament =

Basketball at the 2018 Commonwealth Games
- Venue: Cairns Convention Centre; Townsville Entertainment and Convention Centre; Gold Coast Convention and Exhibition Centre
- Dates: 5–14 April 2018
- Competitors: 96 from 8 nations

Medalists
| gold medal | Australia |
| silver medal | England |
| bronze medal | New Zealand |

The women's basketball tournament at the 2018 Commonwealth Games was held on the Gold Coast, Australia from April 5 to 15. The basketball competition was held at three venues: Cairns Convention Centre in Cairns, Townsville Entertainment and Convention Centre in Townsville for the preliminaries and the Gold Coast Convention and Exhibition Centre on the Gold Coast for the finals. This was the second time that the basketball competition was held at the Commonwealth Games. A total of eight women's competed (96 athletes, at 12 per team) in each respective tournament. Australia won the gold medal, defeating England in the final. New Zealand won the bronze medal.

== Qualification ==
A total of eight women's teams qualified to compete at the games. At least four out of the six Commonwealth regions were considered to be represented in each tournament, if possible. For the home nations, each country may compete, however the ranking of Great Britain was given to the home nation with the most players on the team. The teams were officially confirmed on July 28, 2017.

| Event | Date | Vacancies | Qualified |
|---|---|---|---|
| Host Nation | —N/a | 1 | Australia |
| Best Commonwealth Teams in the FIBA World Rankings | 1 July 2017 | 3 | Canada; England; Mozambique |
| CGF/FIBA invitation | 7 July 2017 | 4 | Jamaica; New Zealand; Malaysia; India |
| Total | | 8 | |

== Rosters ==
At the start of tournament, all eight participating countries had up to 12 players on their rosters.

- Australia
- Canada
- England
- Jamaica
- India
- Malaysia
- Mozambique
- New Zealand

== Referees ==
The following referees were selected for the tournament.

- James Boyer
- Sarah Carey
- Jon Chapman
- Christine Vuong
- Arnauld Kom Njilo
- Simon Unsworth
- Kate Webb
- Snehal Bendke
- Ceciline Michael Vincent
- Sandy Ng
- Artur Decastro
- Matthew Bathurst
- Ryan Jones
- Viola Gyorgyi
- Chris Dodds
- Shuet Mei Ho
- Joyce Muchenu

== Competition format ==
The host nation, along with the top three teams in the FIBA Rankings played in group A. The other four teams played in group B. The top two teams in group A after the preliminary round advanced to the semifinals, while third and fourth place played the top two teams in group B in the qualifying round. The bottom two teams in group B were eliminated.

== Results ==
All times are Australian Eastern Standard Time (UTC+10)

=== Preliminary round ===
==== Pool A ====
| Pos | Team | Pld | W | L | PF | PA | PD | Pts | Qualification |
|---|---|---|---|---|---|---|---|---|---|
| 1 | Australia (H) | 3 | 3 | 0 | 331 | 169 | +162 | 6 | Semi-finals |
| 2 | Canada | 3 | 2 | 1 | 226 | 207 | +19 | 5 | Semi-finals |
| 3 | England | 3 | 1 | 2 | 187 | 249 | −62 | 4 | Qualifying finals |
| 4 | Mozambique | 3 | 0 | 3 | 157 | 276 | −119 | 3 | Qualifying finals |

Source: GC2018
Rules for classification: 1) Points; 2) Head-to-head results; 3) Points difference; 4) Points scored.
(H) Hosts

6 April 2018
18:30

Boxscore

| Canada | 80–54 | England |
Scoring by quarter: 15–15, 26–17, 27–11, 12–11
| Pts: Colley, Provo 14; Rebs: Kiss-Rusk 9 Asts: Nofuente 5 | | Pts: Jones 11; Rebs: Stewart 8 Asts: Jones 4 |

Townsville Entertainment and Convention Centre, Townsville
Referees: Snehal Bendke (IND), Jon Chapman (AUS), Sandy Ng (MAS)

6 April 2018
21:00

Boxscore

| Australia | 113–53 | Mozambique |
Scoring by quarter: 25–9, 25–11, 36–14, 27–19
| Pts: Cambage 24; Rebs: George 11; Asts: George, Griffin 5 | | Pts: Gimo 18; Rebs: Mucauro 9 Asts: Zita 3 |

Townsville Entertainment and Convention Centre, Townsville
Referees: Joyce Muchenu (ZIM), Ho Shuet Mei (SGP), Matthew Bathurst (NZL)

8 April 2018
11:30

Boxscore

| Mozambique | 51–78 | England |
Scoring by quarter: 14–19, 13–17, 20–22, 4–20
| Pts: Mafanela 13; Rebs: Mafanela 7 Asts: Cossa 6 | | Pts: Stewart 18; Rebs: Stewart 12; Asts: Jones 5 |

Townsville Entertainment and Convention Centre, Townsville
Referees: Jon Chapman (AUS), Joyce Muchenu (ZIM), Ho Shuet Mei (SGP)

8 April 2018
18:30

Boxscore

| Australia | 100–61 | Canada |
Scoring by quarter: 28–7, 22–13, 19–22, 31–19
| Pts: Cambage 23; Rebs: George 8 Asts: Seekamp 4 | | Pts: Kiss-Rusk 15; Rebs: Kiss-Rusk 9 Asts: Boiago, Colley 4 |

Townsville Entertainment and Convention Centre, Townsville
Referees: Snehal Bendke (IND), Ryan Jones (NZL), Sandy Ng (MAS)

9 April 2018
17:30

Boxscore

| England | 55–118 | Australia |
Scoring by quarter: 15–31, 9–30, 18–33, 13–24
| Pts: three players 9 Rebs: Allen 7 Asts: Fong 4 | | Pts: Cambage 30; Rebs: George 10; Asts: Lavey 7 |

Townsville Entertainment and Convention Centre, Townsville
Referees: Takaki Kato (JPN), Kingsley Ojeaburu (NGR), Joyce Muchenu (ZIM)

9 April 2018
20:00

Boxscore

| Canada | 85–53 | Mozambique |
Scoring by quarter: 28–11, 15–17, 28–13, 14–12
| Pts: Hamblin, Provo 13; Rebs: Hamblin 10; Asts: Nofuente 6 | | Pts: Gimo 13; Rebs: Lhavanguane 9 Asts: Mucauro 4 |

Townsville Entertainment and Convention Centre, Townsville
Referees: Matthew Beattie (AUS), Matthew Bathurst (NZL), Snehal Bendke (IND)

==== Pool B ====
| Pos | Team | Pld | W | L | PF | PA | PD | Pts | Qualification |
|---|---|---|---|---|---|---|---|---|---|
| 1 | New Zealand | 3 | 3 | 0 | 256 | 148 | +108 | 6 | Qualifying finals |
| 2 | Jamaica | 3 | 2 | 1 | 196 | 195 | +1 | 5 | Qualifying finals |
| 3 | Malaysia | 3 | 1 | 2 | 187 | 239 | −52 | 4 | |
| 4 | India | 3 | 0 | 3 | 184 | 241 | −57 | 3 | |

Source: GC2018
Rules for classification: 1) Points; 2) Head-to-head results; 3) Points difference; 4) Points scored.

5 April 2018
18:30

Boxscore

| Jamaica | 66–57 | India |
Scoring by quarter: 16–14, 15–13, 17–16, 18–14
| Pts: George 19; Rebs: George 19; Asts: Dixon 6 | | Pts: Limaye 18; Rebs: Limaye, Sidhu 5 Asts: Sonkar 4 |

Cairns Convention Centre, Cairns
Referees: Artur Decastro (MOZ), Chris Dodds (SCO), Christine Vuong (CAN)

5 April 2018
21:00

Boxscore

| New Zealand | 86–44 | Malaysia |
Scoring by quarter: 24–10, 27–15, 15–3, 20–16
| Pts: Cocks 15; Rebs: Purcell 12; Asts: Hunter 6 | | Pts: Yap 12; Rebs: Pang 7 Asts: Pang 5 |

Cairns Convention Centre, Cairns
Referees: James Boyer (AUS), Sarah Carey (AUS), Kate Webb (ENG)

7 April 2018
11:30

Boxscore

| New Zealand | 80–49 | Jamaica |
Scoring by quarter: 17–16, 24–9, 19–14, 20–10
| Pts: Leger-Walker 18; Rebs: Leger-Walker 6 Asts: Cocks 6 | | Pts: George 12; Rebs: Jackson 7 Asts: L. Gordon, Jackson 2 |

Cairns Convention Centre, Cairns
Referees: Christine Vuong (CAN), Ceciline Michael Vincent (IND), Artur Decastro (MOZ)

7 April 2018
18:30

Boxscore

| Malaysia | 85–72 | India |
Scoring by quarter: 20–25, 28–12, 11–18, 26–17
| Pts: Yap 18; Rebs: Ting 6 Asts: Saw 6 | | Pts: Skaria 19; Rebs: Skaria 13; Asts: Sonkar 4 |

Cairns Convention Centre, Cairns
Referees: Viola Gyorgyi (NOR), Sarah Carey (AUS), Kate Webb (ENG)

8 April 2018
17:30

Boxscore

| India | 55–90 | New Zealand |
Scoring by quarter: 12–31, 10–23, 19–19, 14–17
| Pts: Kumari 14; Rebs: Skaria 9 Asts: Limaye, Sidhu 3 | | Pts: Cocks 21; Rebs: Farnworth 7 Asts: Farnworth 5 |

Cairns Convention Centre, Cairns
Referees: James Boyer (AUS), Christine Vuong (CAN), Simon Unsworth (ENG)

8 April 2018
20:00

Boxscore

| Jamaica | 81–58 | Malaysia |
Scoring by quarter: 21–21, 19–9, 17–17, 24–11
| Pts: George 25; Rebs: George 20; Asts: three players 4 | | Pts: Ting 17; Rebs: Kalaimathi, Ting 6 Asts: Nur Izzati 5 |

Cairns Convention Centre, Cairns
Referees: Arnauld Kom Njilo (CMR), Sarah Carey (AUS), Kate Webb (ENG)

=== Medal round ===
Qualifying finals
A4 | Mozambique | 63
B1 | New Zealand | 79
A3 | England | 62
B2 | Jamaica | 40

Semi-finals
A1 | Australia | 109
B1 | New Zealand | 50
A2 | Canada | 53
A3 | England | 65

Gold medal match
A1 | Australia | 99
A3 | England | 55
Third place
B1 | New Zealand | 74
A2 | Canada | 68

==== Qualifying finals ====
10 April 2018
18:30

Boxscore

| England | 62–40 | Jamaica |
Scoring by quarter: 13–4, 13–9, 22–16, 14–11
| Pts: Vanderwal 22; Rebs: Stewart 8 Asts: Collins 6 | | Pts: T. Gordon 14; Rebs: George 14; Asts: Smith 4 |

Townsville Entertainment and Convention Centre, Townsville
Referees: Leonardo Zalazar (ARG), Michael Weiland (CAN), Snehal Bendke (IND)

10 April 2018
21:00

Boxscore

| Mozambique | 63–79 | New Zealand |
Scoring by quarter: 7–18, 19–23, 15–19, 22–19
| Pts: Mafanela 15; Rebs: Lhavanguane, Mucauro 7 Asts: Cossa, Mucauro 5 | | Pts: Taylor 25; Rebs: Taylor 8 Asts: Hunter 7 |

Townsville Entertainment and Convention Centre, Townsville
Referees: Takaki Kato (JPN), Jon Chapman (AUS), Joyce Muchenu (ZIM)

==== Semifinals ====
13 April 2018
18:30

Boxscore

| Canada | 53–65 | England |
Scoring by quarter: 14–16, 5–19, 19–19, 15–11
| Pts: Hamblin 21; Rebs: Hamblin, Kiss-Rusk 10; Asts: Kiss-Rusk 3 | | Pts: Vanderwal 20; Rebs: Stewart 12; Asts: Vanderwal 6 |

Gold Coast Convention and Exhibition Centre, Gold Coast
Referees: Takaki Kato (JPN), Joyce Muchenu (ZIM), Snehal Bendke (IND)

13 April 2018
21:00

Boxscore

| Australia | 109–50 | New Zealand |
Scoring by quarter: 25–12, 28–16, 30–6, 26–16
| Pts: Cambage 21; Rebs: Griffin, Kunek 7 Asts: O'Hea 6 | | Pts: three players 9 Rebs: Paalvast 5 Asts: Cocks, Purcell 3 |

Gold Coast Convention and Exhibition Centre, Gold Coast
Referees: Wojciech Liszka (POL), Viola Gyoergyi (NOR), Chris Dodds (GBR)

==== Bronze medal match ====
14 April 2018
18:00

Boxscore

| New Zealand | 74–58 | Canada |
Scoring by quarter: 16–12, 18–14, 23–13, 17–19
| Pts: Leger-Walker, Taylor 18; Rebs: Purcell 7 Asts: Cocks 7 | | Pts: Nofuente 18; Rebs: three players 6 Asts: Masikewich, Traer 2 |

Gold Coast Convention and Exhibition Centre, Gold Coast
Referees: Jon Chapman (AUS), Sarah Carey (AUS), Kate Webb (ENG)

==== Gold medal match ====
14 April 2018
20:30

Boxscore

| Australia | 99–55 | England |
Scoring by quarter: 26–10, 23–21, 29–16, 21–8
| Pts: George, Griffin 16; Rebs: George 10; Asts: Ebzery 7 | | Pts: Stewart 13; Rebs: Emanuel-Carr, Vanderwal 5 Asts: Vanderwal 4 |

Gold Coast Convention and Exhibition Centre, Gold Coast
Referees: Christine Vuong (CAN), Ryan Jones (NZL), Viola Györgyi (NOR)

== Final standings ==
| Rank | Team | Pld | W | L | PF | PA | PD |
|---|---|---|---|---|---|---|---|
| 1st place, gold medalist(s) | Australia | 5 | 5 | 0 | 539 | 274 | +265 |
| 2nd place, silver medalist(s) | England | 6 | 3 | 3 | 369 | 441 | –72 |
| 3rd place, bronze medalist(s) | New Zealand | 6 | 5 | 1 | 459 | 378 | +81 |
| 4 | Canada | 5 | 2 | 3 | 337 | 346 | –9 |
| 5 | Jamaica | 4 | 2 | 2 | 236 | 257 | –21 |
| 6 | Mozambique | 4 | 0 | 4 | 220 | 355 | –135 |
| 7 | Malaysia | 3 | 1 | 2 | 187 | 239 | –52 |
| 8 | India | 3 | 0 | 3 | 184 | 241 | –57 |
