= Natalie Taylor (basketball) =

New Zealand basketball player

Personal information
- Born: Natalie Purcell; 24 December 1982 (age 43)

Sport
- Position: Small forward
- Team: South West Metro Pirates
Medal record
Representing New Zealand
Women's basketball
Commonwealth Games
Bronze medal – third place	2018 Gold Coast	Team competition

Natalie Taylor (née Purcell; born 24 December 1982) is a New Zealand professional basketball player. She was a member of New Zealand women's national basketball team at the 2008 Beijing Olympics. She scored five points in the game they played against China, which they were defeated 80–63.

Taylor attended high school at Macleans College. She captained her Southeast Missouri State women's basketball team in the 2004-05 & 2005-06 NCAA seasons and broke school history by making the NCAA tournament for the first time in 2006 with an opening game against Stanford University. In 2007 Taylor returned to New Zealand to debut for the New Zealand Tall Ferns national basketball team and play for the inaugural Christchurch Sirens in the WNBL. She played for the University of Limerick in the Irish Superleague in the 2010/2011 season after previously playing for the BDS Logan Thunder in the 2008-09 & 2009-10 WNBL seasons. She was MVP for New Zealand's Women's Basketball League (WBL) in 2007. Taylor has been re-signed for the BDS Logan Thunder in the Women's National Basketball League (WNBL) for 2011/2012.

Taylor is a member of the Church of Jesus Christ of Latter-day Saints. She is the younger sister of fellow New Zealand female professional basketball player and Latter-day Saint Charmian Mellars.

She is married to Ezra Taylor (former Queensland Reds Super Rugby player now playing in the Pro14).

== Sources ==
- Mormon Times article, 13 August 2008
