= Jamell Anderson =

British basketball player (born 1990)

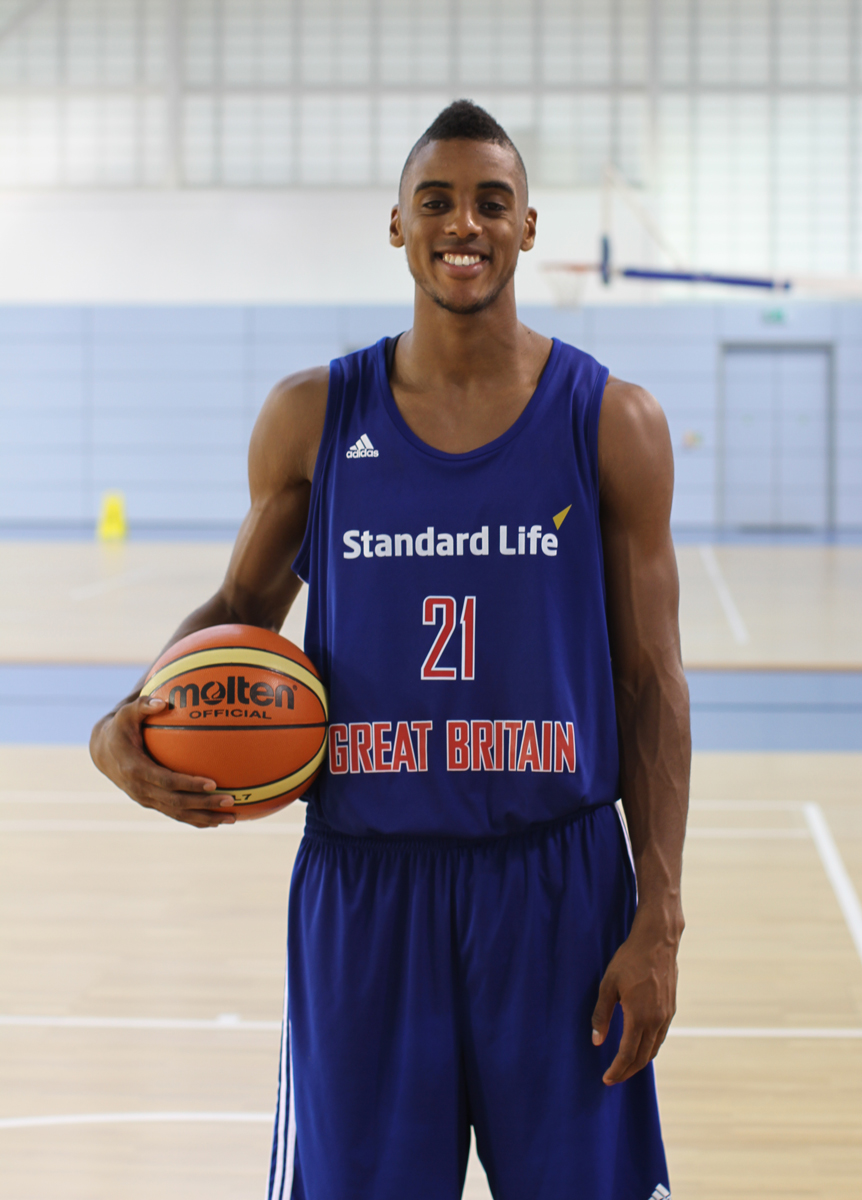

Personal information
- Born: 6 July 1990 (age 36) Nottingham, England
- Listed height: 6 ft 7 in (2.01 m)
- Listed weight: 214 lb (97 kg)

Career information
- NBA draft: 2012: undrafted
- Playing career: 2009–present
- Position: Forward
- Number: 8

Career history
- 2009–2011: Essex Pirates
- 2011–2016: Leicester Riders
- 2016–2017: Cheshire Phoenix
- 2017: Townsville Heat
- 2018-2021: Leicester Riders
- 2021-2022: Manchester Giants
- 2022-2023: Cheshire Phoenix
- 2023-2024: Manchester Giants
- 2024-2025: Sheffield Sharks

Career highlights
- QBL champion (2017); BBL Trophy champion (2016); 3× BBL/SLB Cup winners (2013, 2014, 2025); BBL champion (2013)
Medals
Men's 3x3 basketball
Representing England
Commonwealth Games
Gold medal – first place	2026 Glasgow	Team

Jamell Lenworth Anderson (born 6 July 1990) is a British professional basketball player who last played for Sheffield Sharks of Super League Basketball (SLB).

He has spent the previous four seasons with the Leicester Riders where he won two BBL Championships, two BBL Cup and one BBL Trophy. Anderson also has International experience representing Great Britain throughout their age group squads through to seniors.

== Career ==
=== Nottingham ===
Having been born in Nottingham, Anderson attended Djanogly City Academy where he began his basketball career winning the regional schools competition three years in a row. Whilst in Nottingham Anderson played for Nottingham Youth Basketball Club, Nottingham Nova u18s side and the City of Nottingham's men's side as a 17 year old.

=== Essex Pirates ===
In 2009 he signed professional terms with British Basketball League side the Essex Pirates where he spent two seasons playing Small Forward. He averaged 9 points and 4 rebounds a game in the 2010/11 season.

=== Leicester Riders ===
The 6ft8" forward moved to Leicester in 2011, enabling him to study for a degree at Loughborough University. After being named Most Improved player, Anderson signed a three-year contract in his second season with the club. Anderson represented Loughborough Students, captaining the side to promotion in an unbeaten season in 2011.

In 2013 Anderson's Riders side ended their 12-year wait for a trophy with an 85-80 BBL Cup Final win over the Newcastle Eagles. Anderson scoring a crucial 15 points at the Birmingham National Indoor Arena to help his side in the final. He went on to complete a historic treble adding the BBL Championship & Playoff trophy to the cabinet. He was named Nottingham Sports Personality of the Year for 2013.

The Riders would win the BBL Cup the following season and would pick up a further BBL Championship & BBL Trophy before leaving for Cheshire in the summer of 2016.

=== Cheshire Phoenix ===
Joined the Phoenix in July 2016. Commenting on the move, coach Colin O'Reilly said, "He is a top level defender, and brings championship experience to our club."

=== Townsville Heat ===
On 23 January 2017, Anderson signed with the Townsville Heat for the 2017 Queensland Basketball League season. On 26 May 2017, he was replaced in the line-up by Todd Blanchfield after suffering an ankle injury.

== National team ==
In April 2009, Anderson was selected to play in the U20s European Championship later that summer in Macedonia. He made his International debut in a friendly match against France in preparation for the tournament in Southend, Essex. In 2010, Jamell was named as one of two captains for Great Britain U20s, leading GB to their highest finish with a sixth place in the tournament in Austria.

Over the summer of 2012 Anderson represented England in a 3-on-3 FIBA World Championship in Athens to add to his Great Britain U23 call-up where he played against Lithuania. Anderson was called up to represent England in May, and then in August 2013, was called up to represent the Great Britain senior men's side for the first time.

He represented England at the 2018 Commonwealth Games on the Gold Coast, Australia. He is one of the top three Giant basketball players in Manchester to make the reawakened 2024 British Basketball League All-Star Game roster.

== Personal life ==
Born in England, Anderson is of Jamaican and Trinidadian descent. He is married to Georgia Jones, who plays for the England women's basketball team, after proposing to her on court following England's win against Cameroon at the Commonwealth Games 2018.
