= Dominique Allen =

British basketball player (born 1989)

No. 20 – Manchester Met Mystics
- League: Women's British Basketball League

Personal information
- Born: 10 September 1989 (age 37) Wordsley, West Midlands
- Listed height: 6 ft 4 in (1.93 m)
- Listed weight: 192 lb (87 kg)

Career information
- College: Northumbria University; Oral Roberts Golden Eagles

Career history
- 2018-2019: Visby Ladies
- 2019-2022: Manchester Mystics
Medals
Women's basketball
Representing England
Commonwealth Games
Silver medal – second place	2018 Gold Coast	Team

Dominique Jayne Allen (born 10 September 1989) is a British former basketball player, who last played for the Manchester Mystics of the Women's British Basketball League (WBBL). She was a member of the British women's basketball team at the 2012 Summer Olympics.

== Career ==
=== College career ===
Allen started her career in Birmingham, before spending two seasons playing in the English Basketball League and BUSA competition for Northumbria University, where she earned Most Valuable Player honors in 2006-07. She then transferred to Oral Roberts University in Tulsa, Oklahoma (playing alongside British teammate Georgia Jones), playing 10 games in her first season and 33 in her sophomore year.

In 2010-11, she averaged 5.7 points and 6.0 rebounds per game in 34 games played, including a career-best 15-point and 10 rebound effort against Western Illinois University, her first career double-double.

In her senior season, she averaged 4.3 points and 4.1 rebounds, starting 12 of 31 games played. played her final college game against Wichita State University on March 16, 2012 in the first round of the 2012 Women's National Invitation tournament, playing eight minutes in a 79-57 loss.

=== International career ===
Having already represented Great Britain at the 2008 and 2009 European Championships as an under-20 (averaging 5.2 points and 7.3 rebounds in 2009), Allen went on to play for the GB Futures team at the 2011 World University Games in Shenzhen, China. Allen made her senior international debut in 2012 against Croatia, before being selected as one of twelve players to represent Great Britain at the 2012 Summer Olympics in London. It marked her first appearance in the senior international squad, and the first Oral Roberts University Alumni to appear at an Olympics. It also marked the first appearance of a women's basketball team from Great Britain at an Olympic Games. Allen played for the Great Britain senior team during the 2013, 2015, and 2017 EuroBasket tournaments.

Allen was a member of the Great Britain women's team that competed at the 2018 Commonwealth Games, earning the silver medal after losing 99-55 to Australia in the gold-medal match.

=== Professional career ===
Allen made her professional debut in the 2012-13 season with Italian side Bologna, becoming a regular starter. She left Bologna to sign with the Manchester Mystics for the 2017-18 season, being named the Molten WBBL Player of the Month in January 2017, and later that season, led the Manchester Mystics to a WBBL Cup Final win, earning MVP awards after a 21-point, 11-rebound performance in the final.

In November 2018, she signed a contract with ACS Sepsi in Romania. She also played for Visby Ladies in Sweden in 2019, before returning to the Washington Mystics for the 2019-20 WBBL season.

== Career statistics ==
Legend
GP	Games played	GS	Games started	MPG	Minutes per game
FG%	Field goal percentage	3P%	3-point field goal percentage	FT%	Free throw percentage
RPG	Rebounds per game	APG	Assists per game	SPG	Steals per game
BPG	Blocks per game	PPG	Points per game	**Bold**	Career high

=== Oral Roberts University ===
Year	Team	GP	Points	FG%	3P%	FT%	RPG	APG	SPG	BPG	PPG
2008-09	Oral Roberts	10	11	33.3%	0.0%	14.3%	1.6	0.1	0.3	0.5	1.1
2009-10	Oral Roberts	32	29	44.8%	28.6%	11.1%	1.6	0.2	0.5	0.3	0.9
2010-11	Oral Roberts	**34**	**195**	**55.9%**	0.0%	**68.8%**	**6.0**	0.6	**1.6**	**0.6**	**5.7**
2011-12	Oral Roberts	31	132	50.9%	**35.7%**	54.3%	4.1	**0.8**	1.5	0.5	4.3
Career		107	367	51.9%	25.0%	54.5%	3.7	0.5	1.1	0.5	3.4

== Personal life ==
Dominique is the daughter of former Birmingham Bullets and England men's international Clive Allen. While at Oral Roberts University, Dominique played under the same coach as her father when he was at Northwest Nazarene University. In 2012, she graduated from Oral Roberts with a degree in graphic design.
