= Mollie Campbell =

British basketball player (born 1995)

No. 11 – Durham Palatinates
- Position: Forward
- League: WBBL

Personal information
- Born: 28 February 1995 (age 31) Rochdale, England
- Listed height: 1.83 m (6 ft 0 in)
- Listed weight: 85 kg (187 lb)

Career information
- College: UAPB (2015)
- WNBA draft: 2017: undrafted

Mollie Elizabeth Campbell (born 28 February 1995) is a British basketball player for Durham Palatinates and the Great Britain national team.

She won a silver medal at the 2018 Commonwealth Games and represented Great Britain at the FIBA Women's EuroBasket 2019.

== Early life and education ==
Campbell grew up in Whitworth, a town in Rossendale, Lancashire. She attended Bacup and Rawtenstall Grammar School and Loreto College, Manchester. She graduated from Loughborough University in 2018.
