= Jordan Hunter (basketball, born 1990) =

New Zealand basketball player

Personal information
- Born: 20 August 1990 (age 36) Papakura, New Zealand
- Listed height: 5 ft 8 in (1.73 m)

Career information
- College: Southeast Missouri (2012–2014)
- Playing career: 2014–present
- Position: Guard

Career history
- 2016–2017: Adelaide Lightning
Medals
Representing New Zealand
Women's basketball
Commonwealth Games
Bronze medal – third place	2018 Gold Coast	Team competition
FIBA Oceania Championships
Silver medal – second place	2011 Australia	Team
Silver medal – second place	2013 Australia / New Zealand	Team
Silver medal – second place	2015 Australia / New Zealand	Team

Jordan Taiana Hunter (born 20 August 1990) is a professional basketball player from New Zealand. She played for the Adelaide Lightning in the WNBL in 2016–17.

== Career ==
=== College ===
In 2010, Hunter began her college career at Crowder College in Neosho, Missouri for the Roughriders. Strong showings earned her a transfer to Southeast Missouri State University in Cape Girardeau, Missouri to play for the Redhawks.

=== WNBL ===
Hunter played for the Adelaide Lightning in the 2016–17 WNBL season.

=== NBL1 ===
In 2025, Hunter helped the Woodville Warriors win the NBL1 Central championship.

== National team ==
Hunter is a long time representative of the New Zealand national team. She made her debut for the Tall Ferns at the 2011 FIBA Oceania Championship.
