= Hannah Shaw (basketball) =

British basketball player (born 1990)

No. 5 – Sheffield Hatters
- Position: Center
- League: WBBL

Personal information
- Born: 22 September 1990 (age 36) Stockport, England
- Listed height: 1.92 m (6 ft 4 in)
- Listed weight: 90 kg (198 lb)

Career information
- College: Miami (Florida) (2010)
- WNBA draft: 2012: undrafted

Career history
- 2020–2021: Manchester Mystics
- 2021–: Sheffield Hatters

Hannah Shaw (born 22 September 1990) is a British basketball player for Sheffield Hatters and the Great Britain women's national basketball team.

Shaw represented Team England at the Gold Coast 2018 Commonwealth Games, winning Bronze. She represented Great Britain at the FIBA Women's EuroBasket 2019.
