= Azania Stewart =

British basketball player (born 1989)

London Lions
- Position: Center
- League: WBBL

Personal information
- Born: 13 March 1989 (age 37) Camden, London, England
- Listed height: 1.94 m (6 ft 4 in)

Career history
- 2013: Adelaide Lightning
- 2020-2021: Leicester Riders
- 2021-: London Lions
Medals
Women's basketball
Representing England
Commonwealth Games
Silver medal – second place	2018 Gold Coast	Team

Azania Stewart (born 13 March 1989 in Camden, England) is a basketball player for Great Britain women's national basketball team. She was part of the squad for the 2012 Summer Olympics.

On 16 July 2013, the 6-foot-4-inch (193 cm) tall centre signed to play with the Adelaide Lightning who play in the Australian Women's National Basketball League (WNBL).

On 27 August 2017, her boyfriend, American football player Menelik Watson, proposed to her during a pre-season game, which she accepted.
