= Georgia Jones =

British basketball player

Georgia Anderson
No. 8 – Manchester Basketball
- Position: Shooting guard
- League: SLB W

Personal information
- Born: 3 April 1990 (age 36) Trafford, United Kingdom
- Listed height: 1.72 m (5 ft 8 in)

Career information
- College: Oral Roberts University
- NBA draft: 2012: not drafted
- Playing career: 2008–present

Career history
- 2008–2012: O.R. Golden Eagles
- 2012-2013: Barking Abbey Leopards
- 2013: Cluj-Napoca
- 2013-2014: Loughborough Riders
- 2014–2016: Leicester Riders
- 2016-2023: Manchester Mystics
- 2023-2024: Manchester Giants
- 2024-: Manchester Basketball

Career highlights
- WBBL Cup Winner
Medals
Women's basketball
Representing England
Commonwealth Games
Silver medal – second place	2018 Gold Coast	Team

Georgia Louise Anderson (nee Jones) (born 3 April 1990) is a British female professional basketball player, currently playing for Manchester Basketball in the Super League Basketball. She is married to Jamell Anderson.
