= Ryan Petrik =

Australian basketball coach (born 1981)

- Petrik with the Rockingham Flames in 2022

Perth Lynx
- Position: Head coach
- League: WNBL

Personal information
- Born: 4 March 1981 (age 45) Perth, Western Australia, Australia

Career information
- Coaching career: 2005–present

Career history

Coaching
- 2005–2008: Rockingham Flames (assistant)
- 2009–present: Rockingham Flames
- 2015–2020: Perth Lynx (assistant)
- 2020–present: Perth Lynx

Career highlights
- WNBL Coach of the Year (2022); NBL1 National champion (2022); 4× SBL / NBL1 West champion (2014, 2015, 2022, 2026); 2× SBL / NBL1 West Coach of the Year (2012, 2025)

Ryan Petrik (born 4 March 1981) is an Australian basketball coach who currently serves as head coach of the Perth Lynx in the Women's National Basketball League (WNBL). He also serves as head coach of the Rockingham Flames men's team in the NBL1 West.

Petrik has served as head coach with the Rockingham Flames since 2009. Between 2009 and 2018, he was in charge of the women's team in the State Basketball League (SBL), leading the Flames to two championships (2014 and 2015) and earned SBL Coach of the Year honours in 2012. In 2019, he was reassigned to head coach of the men's team, guiding the Flames to the NBL1 West championship and NBL1 National championship in 2022. During the 2025 NBL1 West season, he took on dual responsibility as head coach of both the Flames men and women.

Between 2015 and 2020, Petrik served as an assistant coach with the Perth Lynx. He was elevated to Lynx head coach in 2020 and was named the WNBL Coach of the Year in 2022.

== Early life ==
Petrik was born and bred in Perth, Western Australia, in the suburb of Rockingham.

== Coaching career ==
=== Rockingham Flames ===
Petrik began his coaching career with the Rockingham Flames men's team in the State Basketball League (SBL). He served as the assistant coach of the men's team for four years before being elevated to head coach of the women's team for the 2009 season. In his first season as head coach, he led the team to one of their best ever performances with a third-place finish and a 15–7 record with no imports and just one national league player. The 2010 season saw the Flames women finish in second place with a 16–6 record while the 2011 season saw them finish last with a 2–20 record.

In 2012, Petrik guided the Flames to the grand final, where they lost to the South West Slammers. For the season, Petrik was named the SBL Coach of the Year. In 2014, the Flames finished first with a 20–2 record and returned to the grand final. There they defeated the Lakeside Lightning to claim their maiden SBL championship. In 2015, the Flames finished as minor premiers for the second straight year, once again with a 20–2 record. They made their way through to another grand final, where they defeated the Willetton Tigers to win back-to-back championships.

Following the 2018 season, Petrik made the switch from coach of the women's team to coach of the men's team for the 2019 season. He returned as men's coach in 2020 for the West Coast Classic.

In 2021, Petrik guided the men's team to their first ever grand final in the inaugural NBL1 West season, where they lost 92–82 to the Perry Lakes Hawks. In 2022, he guided the team to another grand final appearance and their first ever championship, defeating the Geraldton Buccaneers 91–79. At the 2022 NBL1 National Finals, the team was crowned national champions after defeating the Frankston Blues in the championship game. Returning to the Flames for the 2023 NBL1 West season, he guided the team to first place in the regular season with a 19–3 record before losing to the Joondalup Wolves in the preliminary final. At the 2023 NBL1 National Finals, the team reached the grand final where they lost 90–85 to the Knox Raiders.

In October 2023, Petrik signed a two-year deal with the Flames to remain as men's head coach until the end of 2025. He was subsequently appointed in a dual role as the Flames' high performance manager.

On 17 May 2025, Petrik assumed dual responsibility as head coach of both the Flames men and women after the club parted ways with women's head coach, Lukas Carey. Petrik went on to be named NBL1 West Men's Coach of the Year for the 2025 season, with the men's team losing in the preliminary final and the women's team losing in the semi final.

On 29 July 2025, Petrik re-signed as Flames men's head coach for the 2026 and 2027 seasons.

In the 2026 season, Petrik guided the Flames men to the NBL1 West Grand Final, where they defeated the Geraldton Buccaneers 66–62 to win the championship. Petrik subsequently became a four-time championship coach with the Flames – two with both the men and women.

=== Perth Lynx ===
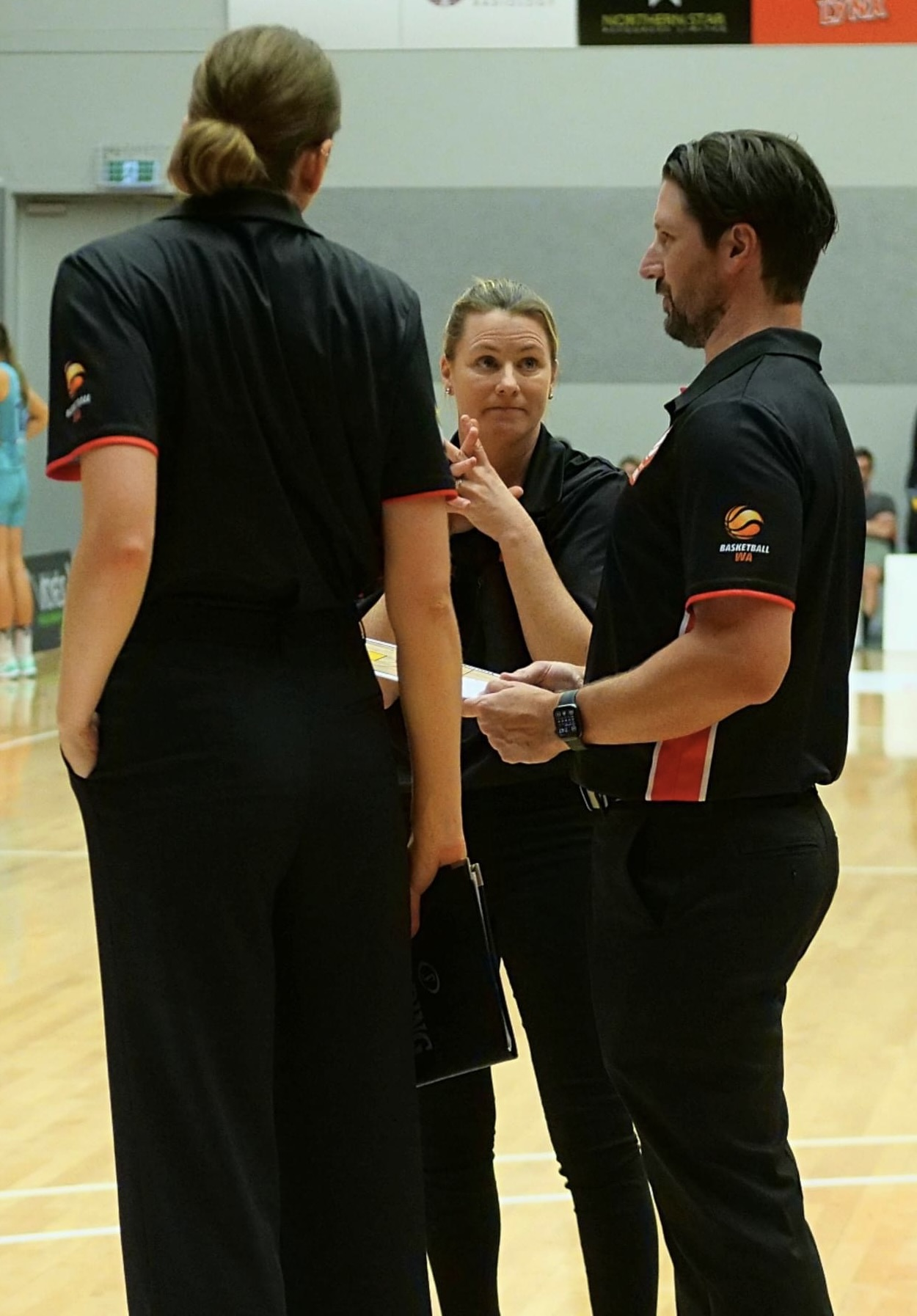
Petrik (right) coaching the Lynx in December 2022

In June 2015, Petrik joined the Perth Lynx of the Women's National Basketball League (WNBL) as an assistant coach.

In June 2020, after five seasons as an assistant under Andy Stewart, Petrik was appointed head coach of the Lynx on a two-year deal. He debuted as head coach in the 2020 WNBL Hub season in Queensland due to the COVID-19 pandemic. The Lynx finished the season in seventh place with a 4–9 record.

In the 2021–22 season, Petrik was named the WNBL Coach of the Year after guiding the Lynx to second place with an 11–5 record. They went on to reach the WNBL Grand Final, where they lost the series 2–1 to the Melbourne Boomers.

On 30 May 2022, Petrik re-signed as coach of the Lynx on a multi-year contract.

In the 2023–24 season, the Lynx finished in fourth place with an 11–10 record and defeated the first-placed Townsville Fire in the semi-finals to reach their second grand final series in three years. They went on to lose the grand final 2–1 to the Southside Flyers.

On 4 July 2024, Petrik re-signed as coach of the Lynx for the 2024–25 WNBL season.

Petrik continued as Lynx head coach for the 2025–26 WNBL season. Known as a running team under Petrik, the club recruited a much bigger squad for the 2025–26 season. He subsequently introduced philosophies he developed coaching Rockingham's men's team in the NBL1 to figure out the best way to maximise tall pair Brianna Turner and Yemiyah Morris. The philosophies helped successfully introduce Chinese center Han Xu into the line-up mid season, and in December 2025, Petrik broke the record for the most ever wins (70) in club history. The following month, he broke the club record (121) for most games as Lynx coach. In the semi-finals, the Lynx defeated the Bendigo Spirit 2–0 to advance to their third WNBL Grand Final in five years. In game one of the grand final series in Townsville against the Townsville Fire, the Lynx lost 88–79. In game two at Perth HPC, the Lynx lost 108–105 in overtime to finish as runners-up for the third time in five years.

On 3 June 2026, Petrik re-signed with the Lynx to continue as head coach on a new multi-year contract.

== Personal life ==
Petrik's father was president of Rockingham Basketball during the 1990s.

In 2019, Petrik married Women's SBL player Chelsea Armstrong. The couple had their first child in April 2021.
