= 2010 State Basketball League season =

- League: State Basketball League
- Sport: Basketball
- Duration: 12 March – 17 July (Regular season); 23 July – 21 August (Finals)
- Games: 26 (men); 22 (women)
- Teams: 14 (men); 12 (women)

Regular season
- Minor premiers: M: Lakeside Lightning; W: Willetton Tigers
- Season MVP: M: Ryan Zamroz (Buccaneers); W: Kaye Tucker (Flames)
- Top scorer: M: Adrian Majstrovich (Suns); W: Casey Mihovilovich (Magic)

Finals
- Champions: M: Willetton Tigers; W: Willetton Tigers
- Runners-up: M: Lakeside Lightning; W: Perry Lakes Hawks
- Grand Final MVP: M: Cameron Tovey (Tigers); W: Jasmine Hooper (Tigers)

SBL seasons
- ← 2009 2011 →

The 2010 State Basketball League season was the 22nd season of the State Basketball League (SBL). The regular season began on Friday 12 March and ended on Saturday 17 July. The finals began on Friday 23 July and concluded with the women's grand final on Friday 20 August and the men's grand final on Saturday 21 August.

== Pre-season ==
In 2010, the SBL held a pre-season tournament for the first time since 2003. The 2010 SBL Pre-Season Blitz was held at Ray Owen Sports Centre in Kalamunda between Friday 26 February and Sunday 28 February.

== Regular season ==
The regular season began on Friday 12 March and ended on Saturday 17 July after 19 rounds of competition.

=== Standings ===
Men's ladder

Pos
Pos	Team	W	L
1	Lakeside Lightning	21	5
2	Willetton Tigers	21	5
3	Geraldton Buccaneers	20	6
4	Perth Redbacks	17	9
5	Wanneroo Wolves	16	10
6	Perry Lakes Hawks	15	11
7	Goldfields Giants	14	12
8	East Perth Eagles	13	13
9	Stirling Senators	11	15
10	Mandurah Magic	10	16
11	Rockingham Flames	8	18
12	Cockburn Cougars	8	18
13	Kalamunda Eastern Suns	7	19
14	South West Slammers	1	25

Women's ladder

Pos
Pos	Team	W	L
1	Willetton Tigers	19	3
2	Rockingham Flames	16	6
3	Perry Lakes Hawks	14	8
4	Perth Redbacks	14	8
5	East Perth Eagles	14	8
6	Mandurah Magic	13	9
7	Wanneroo Wolves	12	10
8	Lakeside Lightning	11	11
9	Kalamunda Eastern Suns	8	14
10	Cockburn Cougars	6	16
11	Stirling Senators	4	18
12	South West Slammers	1	21

== Finals ==
The finals began on Friday 23 July and consisted of three rounds. The finals concluded with the women's grand final on Friday 20 August and the men's grand final on Saturday 21 August. The WA Basketball Centre hosted the grand finals for the first time in 2010, having taken over as the new headquarters from Perry Lakes Basketball Stadium.

=== Men's bracket ===
Quarter-finals
1	Lakeside Lightning	98	105	X
8	East Perth Eagles	76	87	X
4	Perth Redbacks	118	111	X
5	Wanneroo Wolves	109	95	X
2	Willetton Tigers	101	104	X
7	Goldfields Giants	68	85	X
3	Geraldton Buccaneers	108	106	X
6	Perry Lakes Hawks	91	82	X

Semi-finals
1	Lakeside Lightning	114	109	X
4	Perth Redbacks	92	101	X
2	Willetton Tigers	82	108	118
3	Geraldton Buccaneers	112	79	102

Grand final
Lakeside Lightning	96	X	X
Willetton Tigers	107	X	X

==== Grand Final summary ====
21 August 2010
7:30 pm

Box score
Report

Lakeside Lightning 96, Willetton Tigers 107
Pts: Luke Payne 22; Rebs: Jarrad Prue 21; Asts: Ryan Sofoulis 9	Pts: Daniel Johnson 37; Rebs: Ty Shaw 18; Asts: Cameron Tovey 7
Willetton wins SBL Championship

WA Basketball Centre, Floreat
MVP: Cameron Tovey (Tigers)

=== Women's bracket ===
Quarter-finals
1	Willetton Tigers	64	79	X
8	Lakeside Lightning	62	64	X
4	Perth Redbacks	54	61	X
5	East Perth Eagles	47	58	X
2	Rockingham Flames	74	68	47
7	Wanneroo Wolves	79	50	56
3	Perry Lakes Hawks	78	68	X
6	Mandurah Magic	68	62	X

Semi-finals
1	Willetton Tigers	59	70	75
4	Perth Redbacks	60	62	50
7	Wanneroo Wolves	65	60	73
3	Perry Lakes Hawks	68	56	79

Grand final
Willetton Tigers	80	X	X
Perry Lakes Hawks	54	X	X

==== Grand Final summary ====
20 August 2010
7:30 pm

Box score
Report

Willetton Tigers 80, Perry Lakes Hawks 54
Pts: Zoe Harper 16; Rebs: Kate Malpass 13; Asts: Kate Malpass 6	Pts: Belinda Mayger 11; Rebs: Dana-Renae Jones 8 Asts: Dana-Renae Jones 2
Willetton wins SBL Championship

WA Basketball Centre, Floreat
MVP: Jasmine Hooper (Tigers)

== Awards ==
=== Player of the Week ===
Round	Men's Player	Team	Women's Player	Team	Ref
1	Ryan Zamroz	Geraldton Buccaneers	Carli Boyanich	Kalamunda Eastern Suns	
2	Jarrad Prue	Lakeside Lightning	Brooke Hiddlestone	Perth Redbacks	
3	Daniel Johnson	Willetton Tigers	Ashley Gilmore	East Perth Eagles	
4	Doug Gates	Wanneroo Wolves	Brooke Hiddlestone	Perth Redbacks	
5	Jon Meriweather	Perth Redbacks	Casey Mihovilovich	Mandurah Magic	
6	Ryan Zamroz	Geraldton Buccaneers	Kate Malpass	Willetton Tigers	
7	Adrian Majstrovich	Kalamunda Eastern Suns	Dana-Renae Jones	Perry Lakes Hawks	
8	Seb Salinas	Wanneroo Wolves	Brooke Hiddlestone	Perth Redbacks	
9	Tom Jervis	East Perth Eagles	Casey Mihovilovich	Mandurah Magic	
10	Ben Beran	Lakeside Lightning	Heidi McNeill	Lakeside Lightning	
11	Jon Meriweather	Perth Redbacks	Michelle Joy	Stirling Senators	
12	Edward Morris Jr.	Stirling Senators	Marita Payne	Perth Redbacks	
13	Robert Kempf	Perry Lakes Hawks	Samantha Norwood	East Perth Eagles	
14	Demetrius Hazel	Rockingham Flames	Marita Payne	Perth Redbacks	
15	Adrian Majstrovich	Kalamunda Eastern Suns	Kate Malpass	Willetton Tigers	
16	Ty Shaw	Willetton Tigers	Dana-Renae Jones	Perry Lakes Hawks	
17	Ben Beran	Lakeside Lightning	Kelli Hayward	Mandurah Magic	
18	Ryan Hulme	Goldfields Giants	Emma Pass	Cockburn Cougars	
19	Greg Hire	Wanneroo Wolves	Kate Fielding	South West Slammers	

=== Statistics leaders ===
Category	Men's Player	Team	Stat	Women's Player	Team	Stat
Points	Adrian Majstrovich	Kalamunda Eastern Suns	31.2 pg	Casey Mihovilovich	Mandurah Magic	19.64 pg
Rebounds	Jarrad Prue	Lakeside Lightning	502	Brooke Hiddlestone	Perth Redbacks	273
Assists	Joel Wagner	Perth Redbacks	263	Kate Malpass	Willetton Tigers	118
Steals	Ryan Sofoulis	Lakeside Lightning	84	Jess Van Schie	Lakeside Lightning	108
Blocks	Edward Morris Jr.	Stirling Senators	63	Marita Payne	Perth Redbacks	45
Field goal percentage	Jarrad Prue	Lakeside Lightning	75%	Marita Payne	Perth Redbacks	58.2%
3-pt field goal percentage	Doug Gates	Wanneroo Wolves	46.8%	Courtney Byrnes	Lakeside Lightning	34.7%
Free throw percentage	Ryan Zamroz	Geraldton Buccaneers	89.9%	Rebecca Mercer	Wanneroo Wolves	80.4%

=== Regular season ===
The 2010 Basketball WA Annual Awards Night was held on Saturday 4 September at the Burswood on Swan in Burswood.

- Men's Most Valuable Player: Ryan Zamroz (Geraldton Buccaneers)
- Women's Most Valuable Player: Kaye Tucker (Rockingham Flames)
- Men's Coach of the Year: Andy Stewart (Lakeside Lightning)
- Women's Coach of the Year: Narelle Henry (Perth Redbacks)
- Men's Most Improved Player: Seb Salinas (Wanneroo Wolves)
- Women's Most Improved Player: Jasmine Hooper (Willetton Tigers)
- Men's All-Star Five:
  - PG: Joel Wagner (Perth Redbacks)
  - SG: Ryan Zamroz (Geraldton Buccaneers)
  - SF: Cameron Tovey (Willetton Tigers)
  - PF: Adrian Majstrovich (Kalamunda Eastern Suns)
  - C: Jarrad Prue (Lakeside Lightning)
- Women's All-Star Five:
  - PG: Kate Malpass (Willetton Tigers)
  - SG: Casey Mihovilovich (Mandurah Magic)
  - SF: Kaye Tucker (Rockingham Flames)
  - PF: Samantha Norwood (East Perth Eagles)
  - C: Marita Payne (Perth Redbacks)

=== Finals ===
- Men's Grand Final MVP: Cameron Tovey (Willetton Tigers)
- Women's Grand Final MVP: Jasmine Hooper (Willetton Tigers)
