= 2011 State Basketball League season =

- League: State Basketball League
- Sport: Basketball
- Duration: 18 March – 23 July (Regular season); 29 July – 27 August (Finals)
- Games: 26 (men); 22 (women)
- Teams: 14 (men); 12 (women)

Regular season
- Minor premiers: M: Lakeside Lightning; W: Willetton Tigers
- Season MVP: M: Anthony Lee (Hawks); W: Casey Mihovilovich (Magic)
- Top scorer: M: Adrian Majstrovich (Redbacks); W: Hailey Dunham (Magic)

Finals
- Champions: M: Wanneroo Wolves; W: Willetton Tigers
- Runners-up: M: Perry Lakes Hawks; W: East Perth Eagles
- Grand Final MVP: M: Greg Hire (Wolves); W: Kate Malpass (Tigers)

SBL seasons
- ← 2010 2012 →

The 2011 State Basketball League season was the 23rd season of the State Basketball League (SBL). The regular season began on Friday 18 March and ended on Saturday 23 July. The finals began on Friday 29 July and concluded with the women's grand final on Friday 26 August and the men's grand final on Saturday 27 August.

== Pre-season ==
The 2011 SBL Pre-Season Blitz was held at the WA Basketball Centre between Friday 4 March and Sunday 6 March.

== Regular season ==
The regular season began on Friday 18 March and ended on Saturday 23 July after 19 rounds of competition.

=== Standings ===
Men's ladder

Pos
Pos	Team	W	L
1	Lakeside Lightning	24	2
2	Wanneroo Wolves	18	8
3	Cockburn Cougars	18	8
4	Perry Lakes Hawks	17	9
5	Stirling Senators	15	11
6	Perth Redbacks	15	11
7	Willetton Tigers	15	11
8	East Perth Eagles	15	11
9	Goldfields Giants	12	14
10	Kalamunda Eastern Suns	10	16
11	Geraldton Buccaneers	9	17
12	Rockingham Flames	7	19
13	Mandurah Magic	7	19
14	South West Slammers	0	26

Women's ladder

Pos
Pos	Team	W	L
1	Willetton Tigers	18	4
2	Perry Lakes Hawks	17	5
3	East Perth Eagles	16	6
4	Mandurah Magic	16	6
5	Wanneroo Wolves	15	7
6	Kalamunda Eastern Suns	12	10
7	Cockburn Cougars	11	11
8	Lakeside Lightning	10	12
9	Perth Redbacks	7	15
10	Stirling Senators	6	16
11	Rockingham Flames	2	20
12	South West Slammers	2	20

== Finals ==
The finals began on Friday 29 July and consisted of three rounds. The finals concluded with the women's grand final on Friday 26 August and the men's grand final on Saturday 27 August.

=== Men's bracket ===
Quarter-finals
1	Lakeside Lightning	110	97	X
8	East Perth Eagles	91	90	X
4	Perry Lakes Hawks	88	95	X
5	Stirling Senators	83	81	X
2	Wanneroo Wolves	97	89	102
7	Willetton Tigers	86	94	88
3	Cockburn Cougars	104	130	X
6	Perth Redbacks	98	93	X

Semi-finals
1	Lakeside Lightning	76	92	71
4	Perry Lakes Hawks	78	88	84
2	Wanneroo Wolves	104	113	X
3	Cockburn Cougars	95	76	X

Grand final
Perry Lakes Hawks	83	X	X
Wanneroo Wolves	88	X	X

==== Grand Final summary ====
27 August 2011
7:30 pm

Box score
Report

Perry Lakes Hawks 83, Wanneroo Wolves 88
Scoring by quarter: 22–28, 32–27, 16–14, 13–19
Pts: Anthony Lee 27; Rebs: Anthony Lee 13; Asts: Dixon, Tupaea 3 each	Pts: Greg Hire 31; Rebs: Greg Hire 28; Asts: Brad Robbins 6
Wanneroo wins SBL Championship

WA Basketball Centre, Floreat
MVP: Greg Hire (Wolves)

=== Women's bracket ===
Quarter-finals
1	Willetton Tigers	74	74	66
8	Lakeside Lightning	81	58	61
4	Mandurah Magic	61	68	70
5	Wanneroo Wolves	68	42	78
2	Perry Lakes Hawks	72	78	X
7	Cockburn Cougars	59	66	X
3	East Perth Eagles	61	61	75
6	Kalamunda Eastern Suns	69	58	60

Semi-finals
1	Willetton Tigers	68	76	56
5	Wanneroo Wolves	74	68	54
2	Perry Lakes Hawks	66	57	X
3	East Perth Eagles	75	78	X

Grand final
Willetton Tigers	72	X	X
East Perth Eagles	71	X	X

==== Grand Final summary ====
26 August 2011
7:30 pm

Box score (missing stats)
Report #1
Report #2
Report #3
Report #4

Willetton Tigers 72, East Perth Eagles 71
Pts: Kate Malpass 24; Rebs: Unknown; Asts: Kate Malpass 6	Pts: Samantha Norwood 24; Rebs: Samantha Norwood 6 Asts: Unknown
Willetton wins SBL Championship

WA Basketball Centre, Floreat
MVP: Kate Malpass (Tigers)

== Awards ==
=== Player of the Week ===
Round	Men's Player	Team	Women's Player	Team	Ref
1	Greg Hire	Wanneroo Wolves	Casey Mihovilovich	Mandurah Magic	
2	Ben Beran	Lakeside Lightning	Marita Payne	Perth Redbacks	
3	Adrian Majstrovich	Perth Redbacks	Jasmine Hooper	Willetton Tigers	
4	Anthony Lee	Perry Lakes Hawks	Samantha Norwood	East Perth Eagles	
5	Luke Payne	Lakeside Lightning	Tegan Walker	Perry Lakes Hawks	
6	Michael Lay	Geraldton Buccaneers	Gabby Clayton	Perry Lakes Hawks	
7	Justin Brown	Kalamunda Eastern Suns	Melissa Moyle	Kalamunda Eastern Suns	
8	Anthony Lee	Perry Lakes Hawks	Rosie Tobin	Perry Lakes Hawks	
9	Lee Roberts	Stirling Senators	Hailey Dunham	Mandurah Magic	
10	Taylor Mullenax	Mandurah Magic	Casey Mihovilovich	Mandurah Magic	
11	Jarrad Prue	Lakeside Lightning	Ainsleigh Sanders	Wanneroo Wolves	
12	Ben Purser	Perry Lakes Hawks	Emma Pass	Cockburn Cougars	
13	Matthew Knight	Willetton Tigers	Casey Mihovilovich	Mandurah Magic	
14	Ty Harrelson	Cockburn Cougars	Jess Van Schie	Lakeside Lightning	
15	Chris Dodd	Stirling Senators	Samantha Norwood	East Perth Eagles	
16	Luke Payne	Lakeside Lightning	Kate Malpass	Willetton Tigers	
17	Adrian Majstrovich	Perth Redbacks	Heidi McNeil	Lakeside Lightning	
18	Drew Williamson	East Perth Eagles	Samantha Norwood	East Perth Eagles	
19	Adrian Majstrovich	Perth Redbacks	Shelly Boston	Mandurah Magic	

=== Statistics leaders ===
Category	Men's Player	Team	Stat	Women's Player	Team	Stat
Points per game	Adrian Majstrovich	Perth Redbacks	30.04	Hailey Dunham	Mandurah Magic	19.21
Rebounds per game	Jarrad Prue	Lakeside Lightning	21.6	Lavesa Glover	South West Slammers	12.46
Assists per game	Joel Wagner	Perth Redbacks	10.3	Casey Mihivolovich	Mandurah Magic	7.9
Steals per game	Chris Dodd	Stirling Senators	3.2	Casey Mihivolovich	Mandurah Magic	3.19
Blocks per game	Tom Jervis	East Perth Eagles	2.7	Marita Payne	Perth Redbacks	3.44
Field goal percentage	Jarrad Prue	Lakeside Lightning	65.90%	Marita Payne	Perth Redbacks	53.40%
3-pt field goal percentage	Joel Questel	Kalamunda Eastern Suns	47.60%	Kara Hargreaves	Cockburn Cougars	33.30%
Free throw percentage	Matthew Schmechtig	Wanneroo Wolves	89.50%	Leah Rush	Kalamunda Eastern Suns	85.30%

=== Regular season ===
The 2011 Basketball WA Annual Awards Night was held on Saturday 17 September at the Hyatt Regency in Perth.

- Men's Most Valuable Player: Anthony Lee (Perry Lakes Hawks)
- Women's Most Valuable Player: Casey Mihovilovich (Mandurah Magic)
- Men's Coach of the Year: Andy Stewart (Lakeside Lightning)
- Women's Coach of the Year: Anthony Fletcher (East Perth Eagles)
- Men's Most Improved Player: Damien Scott (Cockburn Cougars)
- Women's Most Improved Player: Rosie Tobin (Perry Lakes Hawks)
- Men's All-Star Five:
  - PG: Ty Harrelson (Cockburn Cougars)
  - SG: Luke Payne (Lakeside Lightning)
  - SF: Anthony Lee (Perry Lakes Hawks)
  - PF: Greg Hire (Wanneroo Wolves)
  - C: Tom Jervis (East Perth Eagles)
- Women's All-Star Five:
  - PG: Kate Malpass (Willetton Tigers)
  - SG: Casey Mihovilovich (Mandurah Magic)
  - SF: Jasmine Hooper (Willetton Tigers)
  - PF: Leah Rush (Kalamunda Eastern Suns)
  - C: Samantha Norwood (East Perth Eagles)

=== Finals ===
- Men's Grand Final MVP: Greg Hire (Wanneroo Wolves)
- Women's Grand Final MVP: Kate Malpass (Willetton Tigers)
