= 1992 WNBL season =

- League: Women's National Basketball League (WNBL)
- Sport: Basketball
- Number of teams: 11
- TV partner(s): ABC; Network Ten

Regular season
- Top seed: Perth Breakers
- Season MVP: Debbie Slimmon (Bulleen Boomers)
- Top scorer: Jodie Murphy (Canberra Capitals)

Finals
- Champions: Perth Breakers
- Runners-up: Dandenong Rangers
- Finals MVP: Tanya Fisher (Perth Breakers)

WNBL seasons
- ← 1991 1993 →

The 1992 WNBL season was the 12th season of competition since its establishment in 1981. A total of 11 teams contested the league.

== Regular season ==
=== Ladder ===
	Team	Played	Won	Lost	Won %
1	Perth Breakers	20	17	3	85
2	Melbourne Tigers	20	15	5	75
3	Dandenong Rangers	20	14	6	70
4	Canberra Capitals	20	11	9	55
5	West Adelaide Bearcats	20	11	9	55
6	Bulleen Boomers	20	10	10	50
7	Adelaide City Comets	20	8	12	40
8	Hobart Islanders	20	7	13	35
9	Sydney Flames	20	7	13	35
10	Australian Institute of Sport	20	6	14	30
11	Brisbane Blazers	20	4	16	20

== Finals ==
Semifinals
Perth Breakers	54
Melbourne Tigers	52
Dandenong Rangers	67
Canberra Capitals	65

Preliminary final
Melbourne Tigers	57
Dandenong Rangers	67

Grand final
Perth Breakers	58
Dandenong Rangers	54

=== Season Awards ===
Award	Winner	Team
Most Valuable Player Award	Debbie Slimmon	Bulleen Boomers
Grand Final MVP Award	Tanya Fisher	Perth Breakers
Rookie of the Year Award	Allison Cook	Melbourne Tigers
Defensive Player of the Year Award	Robyn Maher	Perth Breakers
Coach of the Year Award	Tom Maher	Perth Breakers
Top Shooter Award	Jodie Murphy	Canberra Capitals

=== Statistical leaders ===
Category	Player	Team	GP	Totals	Average
Points Per Game	Jodie Murphy	Canberra Capitals	20	354	17.7
Rebounds Per Game	Debbie Slimmon	Bulleen Boomers	20	238	11.9
Assists Per Game	Michele Landon	Sydney Flames	20	158	7.9
Steals Per Game	Debbie Black	Hobart Islanders	20	70	3.5
Blocks per game	Renae Fegent	Canberra Capitals	19	51	2.7
Field Goal %	Maryanne Briggs	Perth Breakers	17	(127/209)	60.8%
Three-Point Field Goal %	Michele Timms	Perth Breakers	17	(35/79)	44.3%
Free Throw %	Jodie Murphy	Canberra Capitals	20	(115/133)	86.5%
