= Lavin (surname) =

Lavin is a surname. Notable people with the surname include:

- Andrew Lavin, Irish politician
- Christine Lavin (born 1952), American folk singer
- Deborah Lavin (born 1939), British academic
- Frank Lavin, American politician
- Gerard Lavin (born 1974), British football player
- Joaquín Lavín (born 1953), Chilean politician
- Johnny Lavin, American baseball player
- Kristy Lavin, basketball player
- Leonard H. Lavin (1919–2017), American businessman and philanthropist
- Linda Lavin (1937–2024), American actress
- Mary Lavin (1912–1996), Irish-American novelist
- Mónica Lavín (born 1955), Mexican writer
- Rodolfo Lavín (born 1977), Mexican race car driver
- Sarah Lavin (born 1994), Irish track athlete
- Sheldon Lavin (1932–2023), American billionaire - owner, CEO and chairman of OSI Group
- Steve Lavin (born 1964), American basketball coach and analyst
- Steve Lavin (businessman), American billionaire, son of Sheldon
- Sylvia Lavin, American architecture scholar
- T. J. Lavin (born 1976), American BMX rider
- Tal Lavin, American journalist
- Tom Lavin, Canadian musician and producer
- William Lavin (1864–1933), American tenor
- Zach Lavin (born 1997), Canadian sledge hockey player

Fictional characters:

- Lucius Lavin, Stargate character
