= List of Roosevelt University people =

This is a list of people associated with Roosevelt University.

== Presidents ==
=== Current president ===
- Ali Malekzadehh

=== Past presidents ===
- Ted Gross
- Charles "Chuck" R. Middleton: the last president
- Edward J. Sparling: the first president
- Rolf A. Weil

== Advisory boards ==
Members of early advisory boards included the following:

- Marian Anderson
- Pearl Buck
- Ralph Bunche
- Albert Einstein
- Marshall Field
- Thomas Mann
- Gunnar Myrdal
- Eleanor Roosevelt
- Albert Schweitzer

== Notable alumni ==
=== Arts and entertainment ===
- Tony Alcantar: actor
- Anthony Braxton: musician and composer
- Merle Dandridge: Broadway actress and singer
- Eddie Harris: jazz musician, saxophonist
- Ramsey Lewis: jazz musician, host of Legends of Jazz and The Ramsey Lewis Morning Show, WNUA radio
- Mary Ann Pollar: concert promoter, activist
- Kate Quigley: comedian
- Courtney Reed: Broadway actress and singer
- Shel Silverstein: musician, poet, and author
- Danitra Vance: comedian (The Second City, Saturday Night Live) and actress

=== Literature, news, and academia ===
- Ira Berkow: author and sportswriter, The New York Times
- Susan Carlson: news anchor
- Parvesh Cheena: actor
- Charles V. Hamilton: political science professor and co-author of Black Power
- Howard Johnson: former chairman, Massachusetts Institute of Technology
- Christopher Robert Reed: historian known for his expertise on the African American experience in 20th-century Chicago
- Martha M. Vertreace-Doody: poet, author, and teacher
- Rick Yancey: novelist

=== Military ===
- Jacques Paul Klein: USAF major general

=== Politics ===
- Melissa Bean (BA): U.S. representative for Illinois's 8th congressional district, 2005–2011
- Leonard F. Becker: Illinois state senator
- Jesse Brown: United States Secretary of Veterans Affairs, 1993–97
- Carla Hayden: Librarian of Congress and former American Library Association president
- Douglas Huff: Illinois politician
- Ambassador Jacques Paul Klein ('63, '71, Hon. Dr. 2005): senior foreign service officer; under-secretary-general of the UN; special representative of the secretary-general and coordinator of United Nations Operations in Croatia (UNTAES), Bosnia and Herzegovina (UNMBIH), and Liberia (UNMIL)
- Mort Kondracke: political commentator and journalist, author of Saving Milly: Love, Politics, and Parkinson's Disease
- Blanche Manning: U.S. District Court judge for the Northern District of Illinois
- LeRoy Martin: chief of police for the State of Illinois, Central Management Services
- Mel Reynolds: politician and congressman, Illinois 2nd 1993–95
- Fred Rice, Jr., superintendent of the Chicago Police Department
- Bobby Rush (BGS): politician and congressman, Illinois 1st since 1993
- Harold Washington (BA): lawyer, 51st mayor of Chicago (first African American to hold the title), former state representative and state senator

== Others ==
- Dankmar Adler: architect of the auditorium building
- Sheldon Lavin (born 1932), billionaire owner, CEO and chairman of OSI Group
- Louis Sullivan: architect of the auditorium building
- Florenz Ziegfeld: founder of Chicago Musical College

== Notable faculty ==
- Mojisola Adeyeye: director general of NAFDAC, Nigeria; founding chair of Biopharmaceutical Sciences
- Rose Hum Lee: first woman and first Chinese American to head a US university sociology department, appointed 1956
