= Lazin (surname) =

Lazin is a surname. Notable people with the surname include:

- Lauren Lazin (fl. 1982–2015), American filmmaker
- Malcolm L. Lazin (born 1943), American social activist, prosecutor, entrepreneur and educator

== See also ==
- Lavin (surname)
