= 2009 State Basketball League season =

- League: State Basketball League
- Sport: Basketball
- Duration: 13 March – 18 July (Regular season); 24 July – 22 August (Finals)
- Games: 26 (men); 22 (women)
- Teams: 14 (men); 12 (women)

Regular season
- Minor premiers: M: Lakeside Lightning; W: Perry Lakes Hawks
- Season MVP: M: Luke Meyer (Buccaneers); W: Brooke Hiddlestone (Redbacks)
- Top scorer: M: Chris Lynch (Redbacks); W: Deanna Smith (Hawks)

Finals
- Champions: M: Lakeside Lightning; W: Willetton Tigers
- Runners-up: M: Perry Lakes Hawks; W: Mandurah Magic
- Grand Final MVP: M: Luke Payne (Lightning); W: Ashley Gilmore (Tigers)

SBL seasons
- ← 2008 2010 →

The 2009 State Basketball League season was the 21st season of the State Basketball League (SBL). The regular season began on Friday 13 March and ended on Saturday 18 July. The finals began on Friday 24 July and concluded with the women's grand final on Friday 21 August and the men's grand final on Saturday 22 August.

== Regular season ==
The regular season began on Friday 13 March and ended on Saturday 18 July after 19 rounds of competition.

=== Standings ===
Men's ladder

Pos
Pos	Team	W	L
1	Lakeside Lightning	22	4
2	Goldfields Giants	21	5
3	Wanneroo Wolves	18	8
4	Geraldton Buccaneers	18	8
5	Cockburn Cougars	18	8
6	Perry Lakes Hawks	17	9
7	Kalamunda Eastern Suns	11	15
8	Perth Redbacks	11	15
9	Stirling Senators	11	15
10	Willetton Tigers	10	16
11	Rockingham Flames	8	18
12	East Perth Eagles	8	18
13	South West Slammers	6	20
14	Mandurah Magic	3	23

Women's ladder

Pos
Pos	Team	W	L
1	Perry Lakes Hawks	19	3
2	Willetton Tigers	15	7
3	Rockingham Flames	15	7
4	Perth Redbacks	14	8
5	Mandurah Magic	13	9
6	Kalamunda Eastern Suns	12	10
7	Lakeside Lightning	12	10
8	Wanneroo Wolves	10	12
9	Cockburn Cougars	9	13
10	East Perth Eagles	9	13
11	South West Slammers	3	19
12	Stirling Senators	1	21

== Finals ==
The finals began on Friday 24 July and consisted of three rounds. The finals concluded with the women's grand final on Friday 21 August and the men's grand final on Saturday 22 August. Perry Lakes Basketball Stadium served as the grand final host venue for the last time in 2009, with the WA Basketball Centre taking over as headquarters in 2010.

=== Men's bracket ===
Quarter-finals
1	Lakeside Lightning	89	105	98
8	Perth Redbacks	96	81	85
4	Geraldton Buccaneers	111	97	107
5	Cockburn Cougars	105	98	95
2	Goldfields Giants	99	111	X
7	Kalamunda Eastern Suns	87	99	X
3	Wanneroo Wolves	96	95	X
6	Perry Lakes Hawks	103	112	X

Semi-finals
1	Lakeside Lightning	97	91	X
4	Geraldton Buccaneers	81	87	X
2	Goldfields Giants	91	99	X
6	Perry Lakes Hawks	94	104	X

Grand final
Lakeside Lightning	85	X	X
Perry Lakes Hawks	77	X	X

==== Grand Final summary ====
22 August 2009
7:30 pm

Box score
Report #1
Report #2

Lakeside Lightning 85, Perry Lakes Hawks 77
Scoring by quarter: 30–18, 30–24, 11–15, 14–20
Pts: Luke Payne 29; Rebs: Jarrad Prue 12; Asts: Ryan Sofoulis 4	Pts: Tom Garlepp 17; Rebs: Daniel Hawkins 13; Asts: Joe-Alan Tupaea 4
Lakeside wins SBL Championship

Perry Lakes Basketball Stadium, Floreat
MVP: Luke Payne (Lightning)

=== Women's bracket ===
Quarter-finals
1	Perry Lakes Hawks	88	72	X
8	Wanneroo Wolves	71	58	X
4	Perth Redbacks	59	67	X
5	Mandurah Magic	86	83	X
2	Willetton Tigers	78	75	X
7	Lakeside Lightning	57	48	X
3	Rockingham Flames	53	83	X
6	Kalamunda Eastern Suns	57	91	X

Semi-finals
1	Perry Lakes Hawks	73	57	X
5	Mandurah Magic	80	66	X
2	Willetton Tigers	77	83	78
6	Kalamunda Eastern Suns	55	84	51

Grand final
Mandurah Magic	63	X	X
Willetton Tigers	73	X	X

==== Grand Final summary ====
21 August 2009
7:30 pm

Box score
Report #1
Report #2

Willetton Tigers 73, Mandurah Magic 63
Pts: Ashley Gilmore 21; Rebs: Ashley Gilmore 9 Asts: Jasmine Hooper 6	Pts: Shelly Boston 15; Rebs: Shelly Boston 10; Asts: Casey Mihovilovich 4
Willetton wins SBL Championship

Perry Lakes Basketball Stadium, Floreat
MVP: Ashley Gilmore (Tigers)

== Awards ==
=== Player of the Week ===
Round	Men's Player	Team	Women's Player	Team	Ref
1	Josh Johnson	Willetton Tigers	Brooke Hiddlestone	Perth Redbacks	
2	Luke Meyer	Geraldton Buccaneers	Natalie Young	Lakeside Lightning	
3	Luke Meyer	Geraldton Buccaneers	Deanna Smith	Perry Lakes Hawks	
4	Tom Garlepp	Perry Lakes Hawks	Kaye Tucker	Rockingham Flames	
5	Robert Epps	Willetton Tigers	Ashley Gilmore	Willetton Tigers	
6	Seb Salinas	Stirling Senators	Sharelle Johnson	Rockingham Flames	
7	Luke Meyer	Geraldton Buccaneers	Shelly Boston	Mandurah Magic	
8	Edward Morris Jr.	Stirling Senators	Deanna Smith	Perry Lakes Hawks	
9	Jeff Dowdell	Wanneroo Wolves	Ashley Gilmore	Willetton Tigers	
10	Adrian Majstrovich	Kalamunda Eastern Suns	Natalie Young	Lakeside Lightning	
11	Ryan Godfrey	Rockingham Flames	Shelly Boston	Mandurah Magic	
12	Jarrad Prue	Lakeside Lightning	Sandra Faye Muller-Garner	East Perth Eagles	
13	Clint Read	Willetton Tigers	Deanna Smith	Perry Lakes Hawks	
14	Douglas McLaughlin-Williams	Cockburn Cougars	Brooke Hiddlestone	Perth Redbacks	
15	Tom Garlepp	Perry Lakes Hawks	Renae Camino	Perth Redbacks	
16	Adrian Majstrovich	Kalamunda Eastern Suns	Carly Wilson	East Perth Eagles	
17	Alonzo Hird	Goldfields Giants	Deanna Smith	Perry Lakes Hawks	
18	Shamus Ballantyne	Goldfields Giants	Ashley Gilmore	Willetton Tigers	
19	Chris Lynch	Perth Redbacks	Kaye Tucker	Rockingham Flames	

=== Statistics leaders ===
Category	Men's Player	Team	Stat	Women's Player	Team	Stat
Points	Chris Lynch	Perth Redbacks	29.47 per game / 560 points	Deanna Smith	Perry Lakes Hawks	32.73 per game / 491 points
Rebounds	Jarrad Prue	Lakeside Lightning	18.33 per game / 440 rebounds	Brooke Hiddlestone	Perth Redbacks	15.4 per game / 318 rebounds
Assists	Joel Wagner	Perth Redbacks	9.15 per game / 238 assists	Tanya Kelly	Perry Lakes Hawks	6.76 per game / 142 assists
Steals	Chris Dodd	Stirling Senators	3.04 per game / 79 steals	Kate Malpass	Willetton Tigers	3.29 per game / 69 steals
Blocks	Chris Christoffersen	Willetton Tigers	4.14 per game / 58 blocks	Sandra Faye Muller-Garner	East Perth Eagles	2.45 per game / 27 blocks
Field goal percentage	Jarrad Prue	Lakeside Lightning	69.6% (119/171)	Deanna Smith	Perry Lakes Hawks	56.5% (173/306)
3-pt field goal percentage	Adrian Majstrovich	Kalamunda Eastern Suns	45.7% (64/140)	Gail Eikhoudt	Rockingham Flames	43.2% (48/111)
Free throw percentage	Bryce Burch	Cockburn Cougars	83.6% (122/146)	Deanna Smith	Perry Lakes Hawks	88.6% (101/114)

=== Regular season ===
The 2009 Basketball WA Annual Awards Night was held on Saturday 5 September at Observation City.

- Men's Most Valuable Player: Luke Meyer (Geraldton Buccaneers)
- Women's Most Valuable Player: Brooke Hiddlestone (Perth Redbacks)
- Men's Coach of the Year: Andy Stewart (Lakeside Lightning)
- Women's Coach of the Year: Glenn Ellis (Perry Lakes Hawks)
- Men's Most Improved Player: Ben Purser (Perry Lakes Hawks)
- Women's Most Improved Player: Courtney Hargreaves (Willetton Tigers)
- Men's All-Star Five:
  - PG: Shamus Ballantyne (Goldfields Giants)
  - SG: Luke Payne (Lakeside Lightning)
  - SF: Luke Meyer (Geraldton Buccaneers)
  - PF: Adrian Majstrovich (Kalamunda Eastern Suns)
  - C: Jarrad Prue (Lakeside Lightning)
- Women's All-Star Five:
  - PG: Kate Malpass (Willetton Tigers)
  - SG: Natalie Young (Lakeside Lightning)
  - SF: Deanna Smith (Perry Lakes Hawks)
  - PF: Ashley Gilmore (Willetton Tigers)
  - C: Shelly Boston (Mandurah Magic)

=== Finals ===
- Men's Grand Final MVP: Luke Payne (Lakeside Lightning)
- Women's Grand Final MVP: Ashley Gilmore (Willetton Tigers)
