= Melissa McClure =

Melissa McClure may refer to:

- Melissa Adams (born 16 December 1977 as Melissa McClure), Canadian curler
- Melissa Sinfield (born 23 March 1977 as Melissa McClure), Australian basketball player

== See also ==
- Naomi Melissa McClure-Griffiths (born 1975), American-born Australian astrophysicist and radio astronomer
