= Elizabeth Woods =

Australian magistrate and basketball administrator (born 1960)

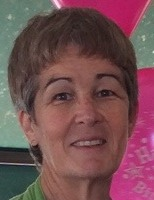
Woods in 2015

Elizabeth Adele "Libby" Woods AM (born 24 May 1960) is an Australian magistrate and basketball administrator who has served as Deputy Chief Magistrate of Western Australia since 2000. Admitted as a legal practitioner in 1984, she worked as a prosecutor with the Crown Solicitor's Office and the Director of Public Prosecutions before being appointed a stipendiary magistrate in 1999. The longest-serving female judicial officer in Western Australia, Woods has also made significant contributions to basketball administration at state, national and international levels, including officiating as a scoretable official at the 2000 Sydney Olympics and Paralympic Games. She served as president and chair of Basketball Western Australia between 2002 and 2014, and has been actively involved with disability sport through Rebound WA since 1986.

In 2026, Woods was appointed as a Member of the Order of Australia (AM) for significant service to the law, to people with disability, and to basketball administration.

== Legal and judicial career ==
Woods completed her law degree at the University of Western Australia in 1982. She first took up articles in 1983 at the Crown Solicitor's Office and was admitted as a legal practitioner in 1984. She was a Legal Officer in the Crown Solicitor's Office until 1992 when she transferred to the Office of the Director of Public Prosecutions as a Legal Officer. She achieved the position of Senior Crown Prosecutor in 1993. As of 1999, she had lectured on a wide range of subjects for organisations such as Curtin University and the Department of Conservation and Land Management.

In July 1999, Woods was appointed a stipendiary magistrate, becoming Western Australia's fifth woman magistrate. She was posted to Kalgoorlie in October 1999, becoming the town's first resident magistrate. She returned to Perth in 2000, where in November of that year, she was appointed Deputy Chief Magistrate of Western Australia by then attorney-general Peter Foss. She remains in that position as of June 2026, earning the title of the state's longest-serving female judicial officer.

=== Evidence in the Corryn Rayney case ===
Woods had been a close friend of Corryn Rayney for about five years prior to Rayney's death in 2007. During the murder trial in 2012, Woods was called to give evidence, telling the court she spoke with Rayney shortly before her disappearance. Woods was a witness and gave evidence during the subsequent defamation trial in 2017.

== Basketball career ==
As a scoretable official, Woods officiated the 1994 FIBA World Championship for Women and the Gold Medal game at the 2000 Sydney Olympics. She also participated as an official at the 1998 Gold Cup and the 2000 Paralympics. In 2005, she became a FIBA Technical Commissioner. She was selected to officiate at the 2026 NBL1 National Finals.

=== Basketball WA ===
Woods first became involved with Basketball Western Australia in 1989. In 1992, she joined the Council of Basketball WA, and remained a Council member until 2006. She was elected to the Basketball WA Executive Committee in 1996 and served as Vice President between 1997 and 2002. She then served as President from 2002 until 2011, at which time under the new Basketball WA Constitution, she was appointed to the position of Chair of the Basketball WA Board. She stepped down from her position as Chair of Basketball WA in 2014.

=== Basketball Australia ===
In 1990, Woods was a founding member of Basketball Australia's National Scoretable Committee. She remained a member up until 2010, when she was appointed Chair of the National Scoretable Committee. She held the position of Chair until 2026.

Between 2006 and 2008, Woods served as a Basketball Australia Board Member. She served a second term on the board between 2014 and 2018.

=== Perth Lynx ===
Between 2005 and 2013, Woods served as Chair of the Perth Lynx / West Coast Waves of the Women's National Basketball League (WNBL).

=== Rebound WA ===
In 1986, Woods became involved with Rebound WA, a non-profit helping West Australians with physical disabilities through sport and recreation. She was a board member between 2005 and 2018, and served as Chair of Rebound WA between 2013 and 2018.

=== Wheelchair Basketball Australia ===
As of 2026, Woods was managing scorebench officials for Wheelchair Basketball Australia.

=== Awards and honours ===
Woods was awarded life membership to Basketball WA in 1999, the Australian Sports Medal in 2000 and Basketball WA Volunteer of the Year Award in 2002. In 2018, she was named a life member of Rebound WA. In 2021, she was one of 11 inaugural inductees into the Basketball WA Hall of Fame.

== Personal life ==
Woods raised a daughter as a single mother.

On 8 June 2026, Woods was appointed as a Member of the Order of Australia (AM) in the King's Birthday Honours for significant service to the law, to people with disability, and to basketball administration.
