= Anthony Lee-Ingram =

American basketball player

Personal information
- Born: March 7, 1988 (age 38) Indianapolis, Indiana
- Listed height: 6 ft 5 in (1.96 m)
- Listed weight: 216 lb (98 kg)

Career information
- College: Danville Area CC (2006–2008); Brescia (2008–2010)
- NBA draft: 2010: undrafted
- Playing career: 2011–2015
- Position: Small forward

Career history
- 2011: Perry Lakes Hawks
- 2011–2012: Asker Aliens
- 2012: Omonia
- 2020–2013: Kumanovo
- 2013–2014: Timișoara
- 2014–2015: BCM Baunach
- 2015: Kumanovo

Career highlights
- All-BLNO First Team (2012); BLNO Defensive Player of the Year (2012); SBL MVP (2011); All-SBL Team (2011)

Anthony Lee-Ingram (born March 7, 1988) is an American former professional basketball player. He played college basketball for Danville Area Community College and Brescia University before playing professionally in Australia, Norway, Cyprus, Macedonia, Romania and Germany.

Lee-Ingram began his professional career in Australia in 2011 with the Perry Lakes Hawks of the State Basketball League (SBL). He helped the Hawks reach the SBL Grand Final, where they lost 88–83 to the Wanneroo Wolves despite Lee-Ingram's 27 points and 13 rebounds. In 32 games, he averaged 28.3 points, 14.8 rebounds and 2.8 assists per game. He was subsequently named SBL MVP and earned All-SBL Team honors.

For the 2011–12 season, Lee-Ingram moved to Norway to play for Asker Aliens. He helped Asker reach the BLNO final, where they lost 80–78 to Frøya Basket despite 18 points and 12 rebounds from Lee-Ingram. He subsequently earned All-BLNO First Team honors and was named the BLNO Defensive Player of the Year. In 23 games, he averaged 20.7 points, 12.3 rebounds, 2.6 assists and 1.4 steals per game.

For the 2012–13 season, Lee-Ingram moved to Cyprus to play for Omonia. He appeared in seven Div A games between October 28 and December 14, averaging 19.9 points and 8.3 rebounds per game. On December 23, 2012, he signed with Kumanovo in Macedonia. He averaged 16.5 points in 15 Macedonian League games, and 14.7 points in nine Balkan League games.

For the 2013–14 season, Lee-Ingram moved to Romania to play for Timișoara of the Liga Națională. In 17 games, he averaged 13.7 points per game.

For the 2014–15 season, Lee-Ingram moved to Germany to play for BCM Baunach of the ProA. In 30 games, he averaged 13.7 points per game.

For the 2015–16 season, Lee-Ingram returned to Macedonia to once again play for Kumanovo. His final professional game came on December 13, 2015. He averaged 9.2 points in nine Macedonian League games, and 10.4 points in five Europe Cup games.
