= Louise Gamman =

English basketball player

Personal information
- Born: 28 August 1983 (age 43) West Drayton, England
- Listed height: 6 ft 0 in (1.83 m)

Louise Gamman (born 28 August 1983) is a basketball player who has been in England's national team. She won a bronze medal at the 2006 Commonwealth Games. She was part of England's first women's basketball squad that competed at the Commonwealth Games. She has called for the sport to be kept in the Commonwealth Games.
