= Ryan Zamroz =

American-Italian basketball player

Personal information
- Born: February 20, 1987 (age 39) Perkasie, Pennsylvania, U.S.
- Listed height: 192 cm (6 ft 4 in)
- Listed weight: 86 kg (190 lb)

Career information
- High school: Pennridge (Perkasie, Pennsylvania); Faith Christian Academy (Sellersville, Pennsylvania)
- College: The Master's (2005–2009)
- Playing career: 2010–2015
- Position: Shooting guard

Career history
- 2010: Geraldton Buccaneers
- 2010–2011: Leicester Riders
- 2011–2012: Borås
- 2012–2013: Sorgues
- 2013: Saint-Vallier Basket Drôme
- 2013–2014: Ourense
- 2014–2015: JA Vichy

Career highlights
- French NM1 Play-Offs winner (2015); BBL All-Star (2011); SBL MVP (2010); SBL All-Star Five (2010); 2× NAIA D1 All-American (2008, 2009)

Ryan Walter Zamroz (born February 20, 1987) is an American-Italian former professional basketball player. He played college basketball for The Master's College before playing professionally in Australia, England, Sweden, France and Spain.

== Early life and college career ==
Zamroz was born in Perkasie, Pennsylvania. He attended Perkasie's Pennridge High as a freshman before transferring to Faith Christian Academy in nearby Sellersville.

Between 2005 and 2009, Zamroz attended The Master's College and played for the Mustangs in the Golden State Athletic Conference of the National Association of Intercollegiate Athletics. He finished his career as the seventh all-time highest scorer with 1,862 points. He also made 222 3-pointers at 40.6% and 378 free throws at 80.1%.

== Professional career ==
In February 2010, Zamroz moved to Australia to begin his professional career with the Geraldton Buccaneers of the State Basketball League (SBL). He went on to be named the SBL Most Valuable Player for the 2010 season. In 31 games for the Buccaneers, he averaged 28.9 points, 4.2 rebounds and 4.5 assists per game.

On September 2, 2010, Zamroz signed with the Leicester Riders for the British Basketball League. In 43 games during the 2010–11 season, he averaged 18.0 points, 3.0 rebounds and 2.9 assists per game.

On May 31, 2011, Zamroz signed with Borås Basket of the Swedish Basketligan. In 45 games in 2011–12, he averaged 16.2 points, 2.1 rebounds and 2.0 assists per game.

In June 2012, Zamroz signed with Sorgues Basket Club of the French Third Division. In 27 games in 2012–13, he averaged 18.6 points, 2.4 rebounds and 3.3 assists per game.

On June 18, 2013, Zamroz signed with Saint-Vallier Basket Drôme of the French LNB Pro B. He left Saint-Vallier in December 2013 after averaging 11.0 points in 12 games. He subsequently moved to Spain and joined Ourense of the LEB Oro for the rest of the 2013–14 season. In 14 games for Ourense, he averaged 11.4 points, 1.3 rebounds and 1.1 assists per game.

Zamroz returned to France for the 2014–15 season, playing for JA Vichy of the French Third Division. He helped Vichy finish second on the season with a 23–11 record before going on to help them win the NM1 Play-Offs with 16 points in the final against ADA Blois. In 32 games, he averaged 12.4 points, 2.3 rebounds and 1.8 assists per game.

== Personal life ==
Zamroz and his wife, Stacy, have three children. His father, Walt, is a former high school basketball coach in Pennsylvania.
