= Luke Payne =

American basketball player and coach

Personal information
- Born: October 3, 1985 (age 41) Charlotte, North Carolina, U.S.
- Listed height: 6 ft 2 in (1.88 m)
- Listed weight: 185 lb (84 kg)

Career information
- High school: Greensboro Day School (Greensboro, North Carolina); Spartanburg (Spartanburg, South Carolina)
- College: USC Upstate (2004–2008)
- NBA draft: 2008: undrafted
- Playing career: 2009–2012
- Position: Guard
- Number: 21
- Coaching career: 2012–2015

Career history

Playing
- 2009–2012: Lakeside Lightning

Coaching
- 2012–2015: USC Upstate (assistant)

Career highlights
- SBL champion (2009); SBL Grand Final MVP (2009); 3× SBL All-Star Five (2009, 2011, 2012)

Luke Payne (born October 3, 1985) is an American former basketball player and coach. He played both guard positions during his playing days; he was a standout college player for the USC Upstate Spartans before moving to Australia and forging a successful four-year career with the Lakeside Lightning of the State Basketball League (SBL). In 2012, he returned to USC Upstate, joining the Spartans men's basketball team as an assistant coach under his father, Eddie, the head coach.

== High school career ==
Payne was born in Charlotte, North Carolina. He began his high school career at Greensboro Day School in Greensboro, North Carolina, where he was a member of the school's state championship team as a sophomore in 2001–02. In 2002, he transferred to Spartanburg High School in Spartanburg, South Carolina, where he was named team captain of the basketball team. As a senior in 2003–04, he averaged 14 points, four assists and four rebounds per game while earning All-Region and All-State honors.

== College career ==
As a freshman at USC Upstate in 2004–05, Payne saw action in 31 games while receiving 16 starting assignments. He ranked fourth on the team in scoring with 8.6 points, and with 2.5 rebounds and 2.6 assists per game, he helped the Spartans win the Peach Belt Conference regular season championship.

As a sophomore in 2005–06, Payne played in all 30 games while starting 28 times and ranking third on the team and 20th in the Peach Belt Conference with 11.8 points per game. He also averaged 2.9 rebounds and 3.2 assists per game, and led the league with a 2.04 assist-to-turnover ratio. His contributions helped lead the Spartans to the 2006 NCAA Division II men's basketball tournament after winning the Peach Belt Conference tournament.

As a junior in 2006–07, Payne played in all 28 games for the Spartans, starting 27 times and averaging 11.2 points per game, good for third on the team. He also averaged 3.1 rebounds and 3.3 assists per game. On February 21, 2007, he scored a then career-high 24 points against Lander University.

After participating in the NCAA Division II men's basketball tournament in back-to-back seasons, the Spartans earned promotion into the NCAA Division I for the 2007–08 season. As a senior that year, Payne earned Atlantic Sun All-Academic honors and was named an Academic All-American. He picked up USC Upstate student-athlete of the year honors in 2007–08 after totalling 448 points, garnered A-Sun Player of the Week honors on December 24, 2007, and was named to the All-Tournament teams at the BP Top of the World Classic and the State Farm Insurance Sun Bowl Tournament. In 30 games (29 starts), he averaged 14.9 points, 2.6 rebounds, 2.8 assists and 1.4 steals in 32.6 minutes per game. On December 22, he scored a career-high 26 points in a loss to Buffalo.

Payne finished his four-year career at USC Upstate with 1,381 points, ranking him 10th on the school's all-time scoring list. His 119 career games and 333 free throws ranks him seventh and fourth respectively in school history.

In January 2015, Payne was inducted into the USC Upstate Hall of Fame, becoming the 14th person affiliated with the men's basketball program at USC Spartanburg/USC Upstate to go into the Hall of Fame, and the first who played at the Division I level.

== Professional career ==
=== Lakeside Lightning (2009–2012) ===
==== 2009 season: SBL championship and grand final MVP ====
Coming out of college, Payne had some European teams interested in him but received no offers, so he landed in Australia's second-tier division, joining the Lakeside Lightning of the State Basketball League (SBL) for the 2009 season. He played well upon arrival and quickly grew a target on his back. He led the league in scoring for most of the season and guided the Lightning to the minor premiership with a 22–4 record. He went on to lead the Lightning through to the SBL Grand Final, where behind Payne's 29 points, Lakeside defeated the Perry Lakes Hawks 85–77 to win the championship. Payne was subsequently named grand final MVP and earned SBL All-Star Five honors.

==== 2010 season: Another grand final appearance ====
Payne returned to the Lightning for the 2010 SBL season and ranked second on the team and fourth in the league with 22.8 points per game during the regular season. He once again helped the Lightning win the minor premiership with a 21–5 record and guided them through to their second straight SBL Grand Final. However, despite Payne top-scoring for Lakeside with 22 points, the Lightning were defeated 107–96 by the Willetton Tigers.

==== 2011 season: Another minor premiership ====
Payne returned to Lakeside for a third season in 2011, but got off to a slow start to begin the campaign as he scored seven points in the season opener and four points a week later. Payne reached double-figures with 15 points against the Perth Redbacks in the third contest of the season, which began a streak of 24 straight games of double-digit scoring for Payne as he finished the regular season with 23 consecutive games of 20 or more points. Payne posted a new career high with 50 points on July 1 in a 100–86 victory over the Rockingham Flames. He connected on a season-best 19 field goals (27 attempts) against the Flames, while also connecting on a season-high 11 three-pointers (13 attempts). The Lightning won 16 consecutive games to finish the regular season, earning their third straight minor premiership with a 24–2 record. Payne led the team and ranked fourth in the league in scoring at 27.8 points per game during the regular season. The Lightning's quest for a third straight grand final appearance ended with a 2–1 defeat at the hands of Perry Lakes in the semi-finals. In Game 1 of the series, a match the Lightning lost 78–76, Payne led Lakeside with 27 points despite missing a significant part of the game after suffering an eye injury in the second quarter. The Lightning went on to even the series with a 92–88 Game 2 victory, but Payne picked up a leg injury in the third quarter and did not return, eventually requiring treatment in hospital. Payne subsequently missed Game 3, as the Hawks went on to prevail with an 84–71 win; the 24-hour recovery time between games proved nowhere near enough for Payne. At the end-of-season awards night, Payne was named in the SBL All-Star Five.

==== 2012 season: Injury-plagued season ====
In 2012, Payne returned to the Lightning for a fourth season. He struggled throughout the regular season with injury, missing six games as a result. The Lightning finished the regular season in second place with a 22–4 record, going on to sweep the Goldfields Giants in the quarter-finals and facing the Cockburn Cougars in the semi-finals. After losing Game 1 against Cockburn, the Lightning evened the series in Game 2 despite losing Payne early in the contest to an ankle injury. Payne subsequently missed Game 3, with Lakeside bowing out of the playoffs at the hands of the Cougars with a 102–92 loss. At the end-of-season awards night, Payne was named in the SBL All-Star Five for the third time in four years.

In 116 games over four seasons for the Lightning, Payne averaged 24.4 points, 4.2 rebounds, 3.1 assists and 1.6 steals per game.

== Coaching career ==
Payne served as an assistant coach for the USC Upstate Spartans men's basketball team in 2012–13, 2013–14 and 2014–15. He served under his father, Eddie, the head coach.

== Personal life ==
Payne is the son of Eddie and Ann Payne, both of whom were basketball coaches.
