= NBL1 West Coach of the Year Award =

The NBL1 West Coach of the Year is an annual NBL1 West award given to the best performing head coach of the regular season. Known as the State Basketball League (SBL) Coach of the Year from 1989 to 2019, the SBL was rebranded to NBL1 West in 2021.

In 2014, the Coach of the Year award for the Men's League was named in honour of John Gardiner following his death. A former Olympian, Gardiner was involved with basketball for more than 50 years as a player, coach and administrator at all levels of the game. He coached more than 400 games and won five Men's SBL championships with the Perry Lakes Hawks, including four consecutive between 2001 and 2004.

== Winners ==
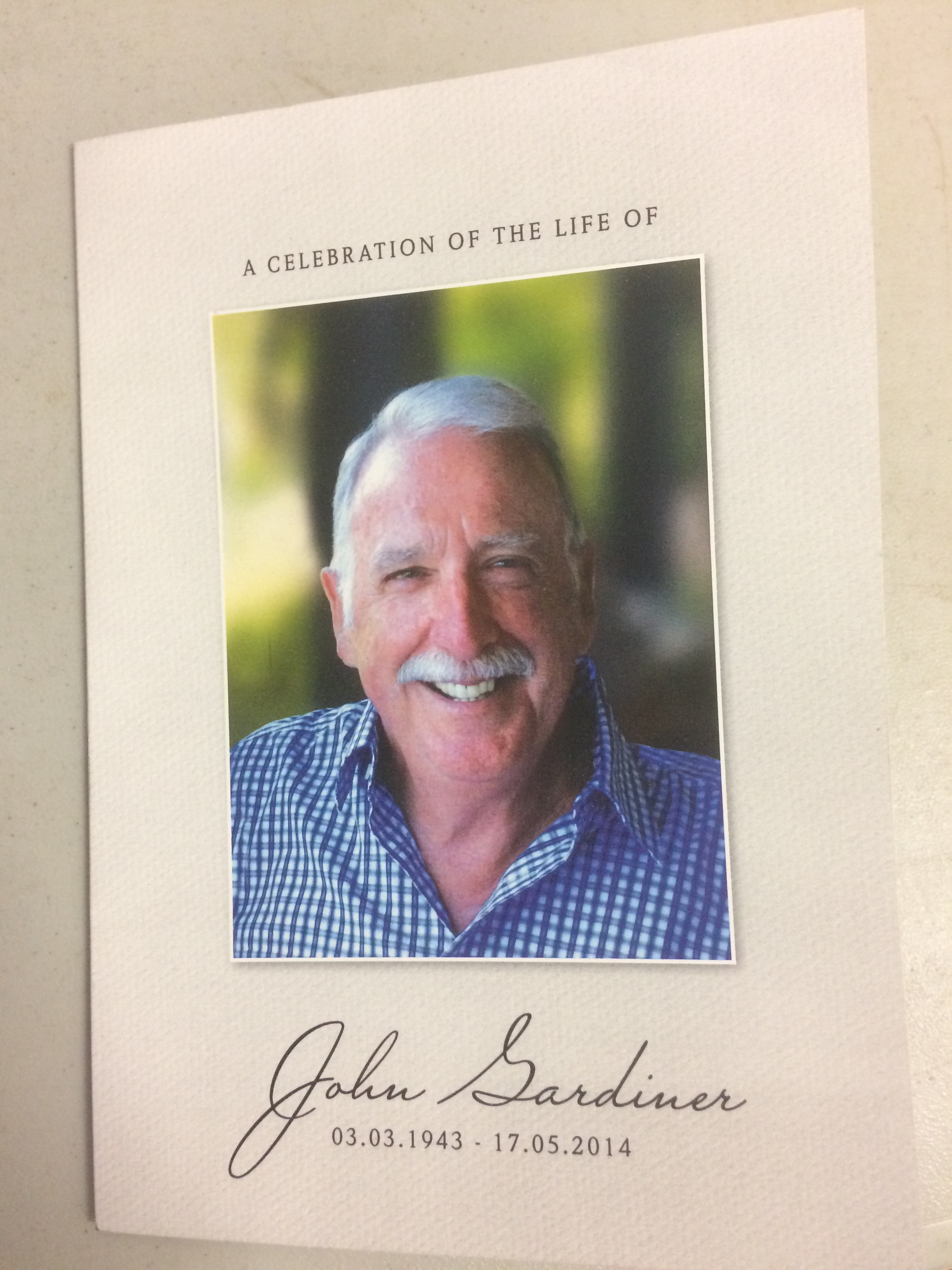
John Gardiner

Year	Women's League		Men's League		Ref
Year	Coach	Team	Coach	Team	Ref
1989	Don Sheppard	Perth Redbacks	Don Sheppard	Perth Redbacks	
1990	Van Kailis	Wanneroo Wolves	Don Sheppard (2)	Perth Redbacks	
1991	Kim Poore	Cockburn Cougars	Alan Black	Souwest Slammers	
1992	Glenn Ellis	Swan City Mustangs	Greg Gurr	Cockburn Cougars	
1993	Glenn Ellis (2)	Swan City Mustangs	Nick Morken	Rainbow Coast Raiders	
1994	Paul Dugan	Wanneroo Wolves	Norm Majors	Swan City Mustangs	
1995	Glenn Ellis (3)	Swan City Mustangs	Steve Hawkins	Bunbury City Slammers	
1996	Steve Jenkins	Willetton Tigers	Jeff Anderson	Willetton Tigers	
1997	John Triscari	Rockingham Flames	Wayne Hayres	Geraldton Buccaneers	
1998	Lloyd Klaman	Cockburn Cougars	Scott Marsden	Cockburn Cougars	
1999	Rick Morcom	Perry Lakes Hawks	C. J. Jackson	Mandurah Magic	
2000	Rick Morcom (2)	Perry Lakes Hawks	Mike Ellis	Stirling Senators	
2001	Brad Spicer	Cockburn Cougars	John Gardiner	Perry Lakes Hawks	
2002	Keith Horwood	Perth Redbacks	John Gardiner (2)	Perry Lakes Hawks	
2003	Lukas Carey	Rockingham Flames	Shayne Hampel	Cockburn Cougars	
2004	Brooke Ryan	Mandurah Magic	Shayne Hampel (2)	Cockburn Cougars	
2005	Robyn Winter	Willetton Tigers	Shayne Hampel (3)	Cockburn Cougars	
2006	Jason Kyle	Mandurah Magic	Steve Charlton	Goldfields Giants	
2007	Rick Morcom (3)	Perry Lakes Hawks	Andy Stewart	Lakeside Lightning	
2008	Robyn Winter (2); Gary McKay	Willetton Tigers; Cockburn Cougars	John Gardiner (3)	Perry Lakes Hawks	
2009	Glenn Ellis (4)	Perry Lakes Hawks	Andy Stewart (2)	Lakeside Lightning	
2010	Narelle Henry	Perth Redbacks	Andy Stewart (3)	Lakeside Lightning	
2011	Anthony Fletcher	East Perth Eagles	Andy Stewart (4)	Lakeside Lightning	
2012	Ryan Petrik	Rockingham Flames	Jason Chalk	Mandurah Magic	
2013	Glenn Ellis (5)	Stirling Senators	Andy Stewart (5)	Lakeside Lightning	
2014	Darren Nash	Lakeside Lightning	Mark Utley	Rockingham Flames	
2015	Randy Miegel	Mandurah Magic	Matt Parsons	Cockburn Cougars	
2016	Craig Friday	Joondalup Wolves	Matt Parsons (2)	Cockburn Cougars	
2017	Randy Miegel (2)	Mandurah Magic	Charles Nix	South West Slammers	
2018	Craig Mansfield	Lakeside Lightning	Dave Daniels	Lakeside Lightning	
2019	Craig Watts	Mandurah Magic	Dave Daniels (2)	Lakeside Lightning	
2020	Season cancelled due to COVID-19 pandemic				
2021	Blake Srdarev	East Perth Eagles	Adam Nener	Willetton Tigers	
2022	Marcus Wong	Joondalup Wolves	Dayle Joseph	Geraldton Buccaneers	
2023	Tyrone Thwaites	Cockburn Cougars	Dayle Joseph (2)	Geraldton Buccaneers	
2024	Brad Robbins	Warwick Senators	Dayle Joseph (3)	Geraldton Buccaneers	
2025	Russell Hann	Cockburn Cougars	Ryan Petrik (2)	Rockingham Flames	
2026	Jonelle Morley	East Perth Eagles	Dayle Joseph (4)	Geraldton Buccaneers	
