= Claire Maytham =

English basketball player

Personal information
- Born: 25 May 1976 (age 50)
- Listed height: 5 ft 7 in (1.70 m)
- Position: point guard

Claire Maytham is a basketball player for England women's national basketball team. She won a bronze medal at the 2006 Commonwealth Games. She was named skipper of England's first women's basketball squad that competed at the Commonwealth Games.

== Personal life ==
Claire grew up in Surrey and studied at Collingwood College, Surrey.
