= Jane Thackray =

English basketball player

Personal information
- Born: 19 March 1968 (age 58)
- Listed height: 6 ft 1 in (1.85 m)
- Position: centre

Jane Thackray (born 19 March 1968) is a former basketball player for England women's national basketball team. She won a bronze medal at the 2006 Commonwealth Games. She was part of England's first women's basketball squad that competed at the Commonwealth Games.
