= Katie Crowley =

English basketball player

Katie Crowley (born 12 September 1982) is a female basketball player who plays for England women's national basketball team.
