= Sally Kaznica =

English basketball player

Sally Kaznica (born 13 March 1981 in Colchester) is a player for England women's national basketball team. She went to the university of Winnipeg and played on the wesmen basketball team in the year 1999 to 2004.
