= England women's national basketball team =

England
- FIBA ranking: None
- Joined FIBA: 1937
- FIBA zone: FIBA Europe
- National federation: Basketball England

Olympic Games
- Appearances: None

World Cup
- Appearances: None

EuroBasket
- Appearances: 1 (1980)
- Medals: None

Commonwealth Games
- Appearances: 2
- Medals: Silver: 1 (2018); Bronze: 1 (2006)
Home	Away

The England women's national basketball team represents England in international basketball competitions. The team is organized by Basketball England, the sport's governing body in England. In 2005 England, along with the basketballscotland and their counterparts in Wales combined forces to form the Great Britain women's national basketball team, with the target goal to field a competitive team capable of winning medals at the London 2012 summer Olympics.

== Commonwealth Games ==
=== Melbourne 2006 ===
The men's and women's teams were competing for the first time as England in a major multi-sport event, and it was the first Commonwealth Games in which basketball was featured.

The women's team included Jane Thackray, who had over 50 international appearances. The squad also featured Andrea Congreaves, one of England's most accomplished players, amalong with several emerging talents.

In the game for the bronze medal, England outscored Nigeria for the first three quarters, but was forced to withstand a sickening comeback when Nigeria shot 29 points to England's 23 in the last quarter. The top scorer for England was Andrea Congreaves with 21 points, Shelly Boston scored 14 and Rosalee Mason with 12 points.

Team

- Rosalee Mason
- Claire Maytham
- Sally Kaznica
- Kristy Lavin
- Caroline Ayres
- Louise Gamman
- Jo Sarjant
- Andrea Congreaves
- Shelly Boston
- Katie Crowley
- Gillian D'Hondt
- Jane Thackray

Coaching Staff

- Coach - Bazany, Branislav
- Assistant coach - Clark, Mark

== See also ==
- England men's national basketball team
- England women's national under-20 basketball team
- Basketball at the 2006 Commonwealth Games
- England at the 2006 Commonwealth Games (Basketball)
