= Flagship Food Group =

Insignia International
- Formerly: Flagship Food Group
- Company type: Private
- Industry: Food processing
- Founded: January 2005; 21 years ago in Los Angeles, California as Flagship Food Group
- Founder: Robert W. Holland
- Headquarters: Denver, CO, U.S.
- Key people: Adam Butler (CEO)
- Products: Packaged foods
- Website: insignia.gg

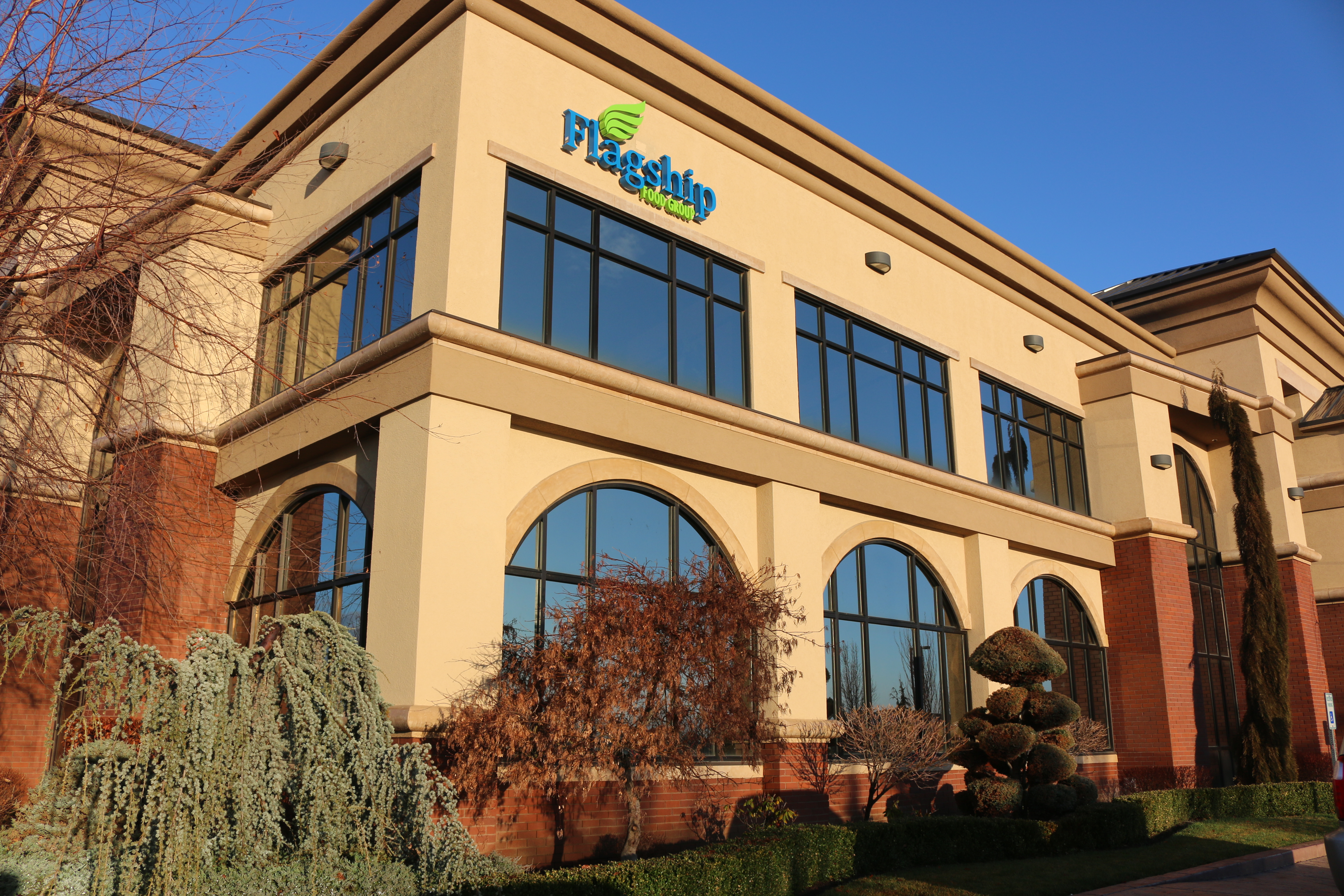
A Flagship Food Group building in Meridian, Idaho as shown in 2014

Insignia International, formerly Flagship Food Group, is a global, diversified food company serving some retail, grocery, food service, and food-related organizations. Flagship was rebranded in March 2024.

== History ==
Flagship Food Group was founded in January 2005 and is the result of a number of businesses and brands brought together to form a diversified food platform company. Starting in 2013 the company had been increasing acquisitions.

Creo Capital Partners acquired New Mexico-based 505 Southwestern, a manufacturer of Hatch Valley green chile products, in 2007; Idaho-based Treasure Valley Specialty Foods, a manufacturer and distributor of branded and private-labeled food products, in 2008; and California-based Excelline Foods, a manufacturer of private-labeled refrigerated and frozen Mexican food products, in 2010.

Creo Capital Partners created Flagship Food Group as a subsidiary in 2012 to bring together a portfolio of food products companies that the company had been acquiring since 2005.

Flagship increased the production manufacturing operations for its 505 Southwestern brand by acquiring a new 80,000 square foot (7,400 m^{2}) facility outside of Albuquerque in 2014. Flagship Food Group relocated its headquarters from Los Angeles to Denver in 2015 to be closer to most of its manufacturing operations.

Flagship expanded its presence in Europe through the acquisition of UK-based Atlantic Foods Group in May 2013. In August 2015, Flagship acquired Oliver James Foods and Proper Pies. In October 2016, Flagship Europe acquired food manufacturer Calder Foods. Flagship sold its European foodservice division to the OSI Group in January 2017 to focus on their American operations.

In January 2021, Flagship acquired controlling interest in the California-based tortilla manufacturer La Tortilla Factory and controlling interest in the Kansas-based tortilla manufacturer Tortilla King a few months later. The La Tortilla Factory manufacturing facility in Santa Rosa was later closed and relocated next to the Tortilla King manufacturing facility in Kansas in March 2024.

In February 2023, Flagship Food Group announced it had acquired the Santa Maria-based Curation Foods subsidiary, guacamole and dip producer Yucatan Foods, for an undisclosed sum.

Adam Butler replaced Rob Holland as chief executive officer in November 2023.
