= Rosalee Mason =

English basketball player

Personal information
- Born: 24 April 1979 (age 47) London, England
- Listed height: 5 ft 10 in (1.78 m)

Career information
- College: Manhattan (2000–2004)
- Position: Guard
Medals
Women's basketball
Representing England
Commonwealth Games
Bronze medal – third place	2006 Melbourne	Team

Rosalee Mason (born 24 April 1979) is a basketball player for England women's national basketball team. She was capped for England over 65 times, has played all over the world and is now a coach. In the 2012 Olympic Games, Mason was one of those selected to carry the Olympic torch.

== Sporting career ==
A veteran of several England campaigns, Mason is one of the original players from the inaugural Great Britain Division B season of 2006. She averaged 10.1 ppg in the Division A campaign of 2009 and made her first major tournament appearance in the 2011 EuroBasket in Poland. She also played for Great Britain at the 2005 World University Games in Turkey and on England’s bronze medal-winning team at the 2006 Commonwealth Games in Melbourne, Australia.

Games	Country	Events	Position	Results
2006	England	Women's Basketball	Bronze	Points
2006–07	GB	European Championships		
2008–09	GB	European Championships		
2011	GB	European Women's Final		Finalist
