= John Gardiner (basketball) =

Australian basketball player

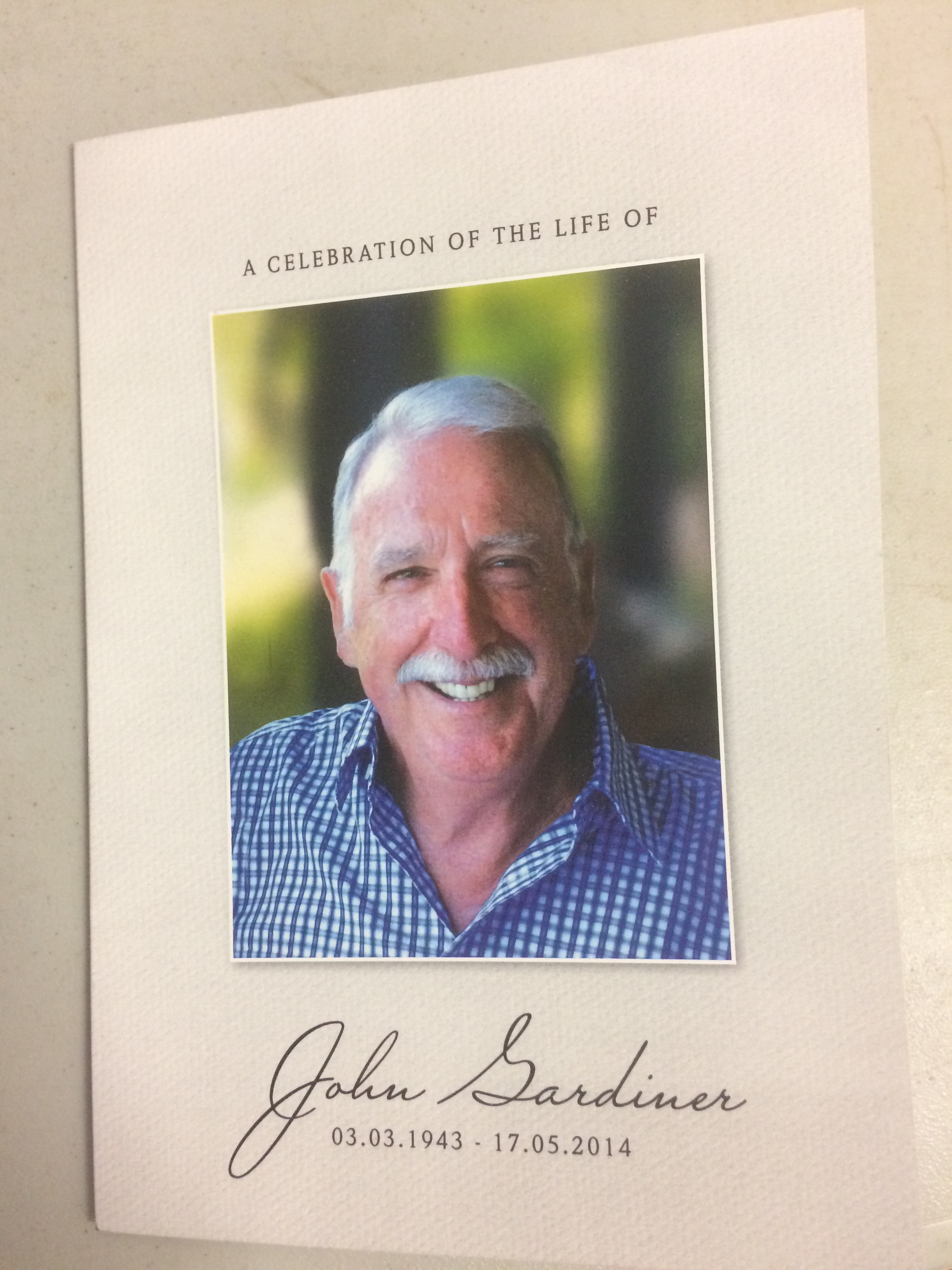

Personal information
- Nationality: Australian
- Born: 3 March 1943 Newcastle, New South Wales, Australia
- Died: 17 May 2014 (aged 71) Perth, Western Australia, Australia

Sport
- Sport: Basketball

John Neville Gardiner (3 March 1943 – 17 May 2014) was an Australian basketball player and coach. He competed in the men's tournament at the 1964 Summer Olympics and was a key figure in the establishment of the National Basketball League.

Gardiner was involved with basketball for more than 50 years as a player, coach and administrator at all levels of the game. He coached more than 400 games and won five Men's SBL championships with the Perry Lakes Hawks, including four consecutive between 2001 and 2004.

Gardiner died of cancer on 17 May 2014. Following his death, the NBL1 West Coach of the Year Award for the Men's League was named in his honour.

In 2021, Gardiner was one of 11 inaugural inductees into the Basketball WA Hall of Fame.
