= Jo Sarjant =

English basketball player

Personal information
- Born: 11 December 1981 (age 44)
- Listed height: 5 ft 6 in (1.68 m)
- Position: guard

Jo Sarjant (born 11 December 1981) is a basketball player for England women's national basketball team. Sarjant won a bronze medal at the 2006 Commonwealth Games. She was part of England's first women's basketball squad that competed at the Commonwealth Games.
