= David Daniels (basketball) =

Canadian basketball player and coach

Medal record

Men's basketball

Representing Canada

FIBA Americas Championship
Bronze medal – third place	2001 Neuquén	National team

David Harley Daniels (born April 2, 1971) is a Canadian basketball coach and former player.

== Early life and career ==
Daniels was born in Fort St. John, British Columbia. He played college basketball at Clackamas Community College and Colorado Christian University, earning first-team all-conference at both colleges. He was named the 1993 Colorado Athletic Conference Most Valuable Player after ranking second nationally in assists and leading his team to the Colorado Athletic Conference title.

Following his collegiate career, Daniels played for the Denver Nuggets at the 1993 Rocky Mountain Review NBA Summer League and split the 1993–94 CBA season with the Rochester Renegades and the Yakima Sun Kings.

Daniels became a regular member of the Canadian national team including at the 1998 World Championships and 2000 Sydney Olympics where he was back up point guard to NBA player Steve Nash.

== Coaching career ==
Daniels spent 10 years working with Athletes in Action before he returned to Colorado Christian College as head coach from 2005 to 2011. He led the Cougars to the NCAA Division II National Tournament in 2008 and was named the 2007–08 Rocky Mountain Athletic Conference Coach of the Year. Between 2011 and 2015, he was head coach of the men's program at Northwest Nazarene University.

In 2018, Daniels moved to Australia to coach the Lakeside Lightning men's team in the State Basketball League (SBL). He was named MSBL Coach of the Year in 2018 and 2019. He took on the dual role of Lightning men's and women's head coach for the 2021 NBL1 West season. He left Lakeside in February 2022.

== Personal life ==
Daniels and his wife Vicki have three daughters.
