= Caroline Ayres =

English basketball player

Caroline Ayres (born 9 October 1981) is a player for England women's national basketball team. She played for the team at the 2006 Commonwealth Games.
