= Edward Morris (basketball) =

US-born Japanese professional basketball player

Edward Morris エドワード・モリス
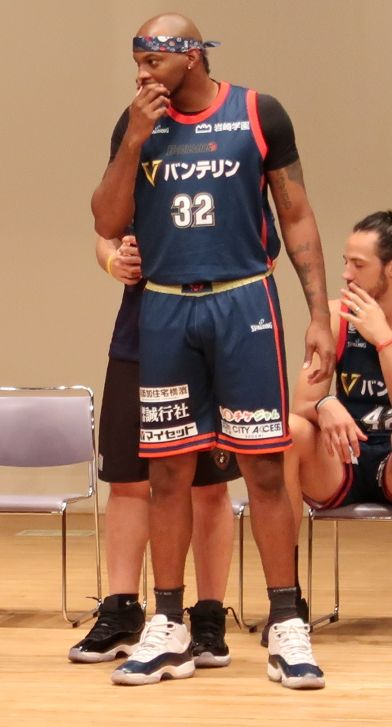

No. 33 – Kyoto Hannaryz
- Position: Power forward
- League: B.League

Personal information
- Born: May 4, 1984 (age 42) Wichita, Kansas
- Listed height: 6 ft 8 in (2.03 m)
- Listed weight: 235 lb (107 kg)

Career information
- College: Pittsburg State (2005–2007)
- NBA draft: 2007: undrafted
- Playing career: 2007–present

Career history
- 2007–2008: Estructuras Zurc/Cruz Torrevieja
- 2008: AB Merida
- 2009: Stirling Senators
- 2009–2010: Aabyhøj IF
- 2010: Stirling Senators
- 2010–2011: Aabyhøj IF
- 2011: Albury Wodonga Bandits
- 2011–2013: Shinshu Brave Warriors
- 2013–2014: Tokyo Cinq Reves
- 2014–2015: Fukushima Firebonds
- 2015–2016: Cyberdyne Ibaraki Robots
- 2016: Saitama Broncos
- 2016–2018: Tokyo Hachioji Trains
- 2018–2024: Yokohama B-Corsairs
- 2023–2024: → Utsunomiya Brex
- 2024: → Shimane Susanoo Magic
- 2024: Shimane Susanoo Magic
- 2024–present: Kyoto Hannaryz

Career highlights
- Japanese B.League D3 champion (2018); SBL leader in blocked shots (2010); Danish League All-Star (2010); First-team All-MIAA (2007); 2× MIAA All-Defensive Team (2006, 2007)

Edward Bernard Morris Jr. (born May 4, 1984) is a US-born Japanese professional basketball player for the Kyoto Hannaryz in Japan. He played college basketball for the Pittsburg State University Gorillas.

== Career statistics ==
Legend
GP	Games played	GS	Games started	MPG	Minutes per game
FG%	Field goal percentage	3P%	3-point field goal percentage	FT%	Free throw percentage
RPG	Rebounds per game	APG	Assists per game	SPG	Steals per game
BPG	Blocks per game	PPG	Points per game	**Bold**	Career high

Year	Team	GP	GS	MPG	FG%	3P%	FT%	RPG	APG	SPG	BPG	PPG
2011-12	Shinshu	52	11	25.8	.576	.208	.532	6.8	1.3	0.9	0.6	13.0
2012-13	Shinshu	52	13	29.2	.528	.091	.663	8.5	2.2	1.0	0.7	13.7
2013-14	Tokyo CR	48	24	30.6	.495	.361	.556	8.6	1.5	1.4	0.5	15.7
2014-15	Fukushima	52		24.8	.529	.277	.596	7.2	1.6	0.8	0.6	11.0
2015-16	Tsukuba/Saitama	50	11	25.8	.478	.227	.564	8.5	1.5	0.8	0.9	11.1
2016-17	Hachioji	50	50	25.2	.479	.301	.601	8.1	1.9	1.0	0.7	13.1
2017-18	Hachioji	61	56	21.1	.513	.250	.565	7.3	2.2	0.9	0.6	11.0

== Trivia ==
He likes to build Tamiya toy cars.
