= Basketball ID at the 2000 Summer Paralympics =

Basketball ID at the XI Paralympic Games
- Paralympic Basketball ID
- Venues: The Dome and Exhibition Complex; Sydney SuperDome
- Competitors: 8 from 8 nations

Paralympic symbol (1994-2004)

Basketball ID at the 2000 Summer Paralympics consisted of a men's event with eight teams competing. The sport was a form of basketball adapted for players with intellectual disabilities (ID).

== Cheating controversy ==
The Basketball ID event at the 2000 Paralympic Games were marred by one of sport's biggest controversies which saw a classification of athlete removed from the next two Paralympic games. Fernando Martin Vicente, former head of the Spanish Federation for Mentally Handicapped Sports, allowed athletes with no disabilities to compete at the Games in order to win the gold medal. The team at the centre of the row was the Spanish basketball team, who won the gold medal after beating Russia in the final despite fielding a team mainly composed of athletes with no intellectual disability. The athletes were quickly exposed and the IPC reacted by stripping Spain of their medal and removing all events from the following Games for athletes with intellectual disabilities. Events for athletes with intellectual disabilities returned to the Paralympic schedule in 2012.

== Medal summary ==
Spain originally won the gold medal, but they were disqualified after it was discovered that ten of the team's twelve players were not disabled.

The official results indicate that no gold medal was awarded for this event: Thomas Reinecke, the Chief Operating Officer of the International Paralympic Committee at the time, stated in an interview with the BBC in September 2021 that the gold medals were withheld because the silver medalists, Russia, had failed to provide evidence regarding the classification of its own team.

Event	Gold	Silver	Bronze
Men's team	Not awarded	Russia (RUS) Oleg Chubasov; Marat Oumarov; Nariman Sadekov; Shamil Kodraleev; Serguei Rogov; Vladimir Fedotov; Igor Gousev; Slava Kosoukhov; Artur Melkonian; Michail Kisilev; Slava Chernobrov; Andrey Zakharov	Poland (POL) Marcin Merk; Andrzej Kołodziejczyk; Robert Kwiatkowski; Tomasz Macholl; Mariusz Wikbold; Adam Krzemiński; Rafał Jastrząb; Łukasz Skory; Grzegorz Sobuś; Tadeusz Truszczyński; Piotr Madej; Robert Wittke

== Group stage ==
Group A
Team	Wins	Losses	Points	Competition score	vs. ESP	vs. POR	vs. BRA	vs. JPN
Spain (ESP) (DSQ)	3	0	254:126	6	-	73:58	94:48	87:20
Portugal (POR)	2	1	251:146	5	58:73	-	71:56	122:17
Brazil (BRA)	1	2	207:189	4	48:94	56:71	-	103:24
Japan (JPN)	0	3	61:312	3	20:87	17:122	24:103	-

Group B
Team	Wins	Losses	Points	Competition score	vs. RUS	vs. POL	vs. AUS	vs. GRE
Russia (RUS)	2	1	239:211	5	-	111:97	79:64	49:50
Poland (POL)	2	1	245:214	5	97:111	-	77:66	71:37
Australia (AUS)	1	2	220:182	4	64:79	66:77	-	90:26
Greece (GRE)	1	2	113:210	4	50:49	37:71	26:90	-

== Finals ==
Semi-finals
Spain (ESP)	97
Poland (POL)	67
Russia (RUS)	73
Portugal (POR)	45

Final
Spain (ESP) (DSQ)	87
Russia (RUS)	63
Third place
Poland (POL)	65
Portugal (POR)	51
