= Tanya Fisher =

Australian basketball player

Tanya-Lee Fisher (born 23 October 1968) is an Australian former basketball player.

== Early life ==
Fisher was born in Northam, Western Australia.

== Career ==
=== WNBL ===
Fisher was a member of the WAIS Rockets in 1987 when the team won the Women's Basketball Conference (WBC). The Perth Breakers subsequently entered the Women's National Basketball League (WNBL) in 1988. With Perth, she averaged 1.0 blocked shots per game in 1990 and 1.1 blocked shots per game in 1991; she also had a .519 field goal percentage (69/113) in 1991. In 1992, she helped the Breakers win the WNBL championship while earning grand final MVP honours.

Following the 1993 WNBL season, Fisher had a two-year break before playing again in 1996 and 1997. As of the 2011–12 WNBL season, Fisher was in the top five all-time in the following categories for Perth: field goal percentage (48%, 528/1111), free throw attempts (343), fouls (366), offensive rebounds (239), defensive rebounds (392), and total rebounds (631, 141 games).

=== SBL ===
Fisher played in the State Basketball League (SBL) for numerous teams:

- Perth 1989–1991, 54g, 1042pt @ 19.3
- Willetton 1992, 15g, 329pt @ 21.9
- Perth 1994–1996, 55g, 873pt @ 15.9
- Cockburn 1997, 11g, 178pt @ 16.2
- Mandurah 1998, 25g, 457pt @ 18.3
- Mandurah 2000–2002, 63g, 531pt @ 8.4

In 1989, she was a member of the Perth Redbacks' SBL championship-winning squad. In 1995, she was named the SBL Most Valuable Player.
