= Jodie Murphy =

Australian basketball player

Medal record
Women's Basketball
Representing Australia

Jodie Lee Murphy (born 18 February 1972) is a retired Australian women's basketball player.

Murphy played in the Women's National Basketball League (WNBL) between 1989 and 1995. During that period Murphy played for three teams; Bulleen Boomers (1989), AIS (1990–91) and Canberra Capitals (1992–95) totaling 122 games.

In 1992, Murphy won the WNBL Top Shooter Award with 376 points at an average of 17.9 points per game. Murphy was also selected to the WNBL All-Star Five in the same year.

== See also ==
- WNBL Top Shooter Award
- WNBL All-Star Five
