= Kristy Lavin =

English basketball player

Kristy Lavin is a player for England women's national basketball team.
