= OSI Group =

American privately owned company

- Type: Private
- Industry: meat processing
- Founded: Chicago, United States (1909)
- Founder: Otto Kolschowsky
- Headquarters: Warrenville, Illinois, United States
- Key people: Steve Lavin, CEO
- Products: Food
- Number of employees: 20,000 (2016)
- Website: osigroup.com

OSI Group is an American privately owned holding company of meat processors that service the retail and food service industries with international headquarters in Warrenville, Illinois. It operates over 80 facilities in 17 countries. Sheldon Lavin was the owner, CEO and chairman until his death in May 2023.

== History ==
=== Early history ===
In 1909, German immigrant Otto Kolschowsky opened a family meat market in Oak Park, Illinois two years after his arrival in the United States. In 1917, he expanded into the wholesale meat trade and relocated the business to nearby Maywood, another Chicago suburb. The company became known as Otto & Sons in 1928. Over several decades, Otto & Sons established a local reputation for offering quality meats. Harold and Jerry Kolschowsky, along with Sheldon Lavin, were influential in expanding the company to what it is today.

In 1955, Ray Kroc opened the first McDonald's restaurant in Des Plaines, Illinois with Otto & Sons as the supplier of fresh ground beef patties. When cryogenic food processing, a method of preserving fresh food through liquid nitrogen freezing, emerged in the late 1960s, Otto & Sons accepted Kroc's offer to become one of McDonald's four meat suppliers. Later, a fifth supplier was added.

In 1973, Otto & Sons opened its first high-volume meat plant in West Chicago with specially developed patty-forming machines and liquid nitrogen freezing tunnels. At the same time, it formed a separate unit called Glenmark, for all non-McDonald's business. In 1975, the company changed its name to OSI Industries. Glenmark was later acquired by Best Chicago Meat Co. in 2011.

=== Expansion ===
Since 1990, OSI has made the following acquisitions and expansions:

- In 1990, it partnered with General Milling Corporation and Alaska Milk Corporation to establish GenOSI, a Philippines-based food processing company.
- In 1995, it entered the India market with the creation of its subsidiary, Vista Processed Foods.
- In 1996, it acquired chicken company Moy Park, which was later sold to Marfrig Group in 2008.
- In 2002, it established OSI China in Beijing.
- In 2004, it acquired G W Padley Poultry and Dove Valley.
- In 2006, it acquired poultry processor Amick Farms.
- In 2009, it established Weihai Poultry Development Co. as a wholly owned subsidiary in China.
- In 2011, it opened a Culinary Innovation Center at its headquarters in Aurora, Illinois.
- In 2013, it established DaOSI in collaboration with Doyoo Group.
- In 2016, it acquired a former Tyson Foods plant in Chicago for $7.4 million.
- In August 2016, it acquired a controlling stake in the Dutch company Baho Food.
- In December 2016, it acquired Flagship Europe from the Flagship Food Group. In 2018, Flagship Europe was renamed Creative Foods Europe.
- In 2018, the merger of Turi Foods and OSI International Foods (Australia) created Turosi Pty Ltd.
- In 2019, it acquired Chicago area meat company Rose Packing Company for an undisclosed amount.

In 2011, Forbes listed OSI as America's 136th largest private company, based on annual revenues of $3 billion. In 2016, it was #58 on the Forbes list of largest private companies, at $6.1 billion. The company's rank slipped slightly to #63 on the Forbes list in 2018. For 2019, its rank came in at #66. Refrigerated & Frozen Foods magazine listed OSI Group as the sixth largest Meat/Poultry/Seafood processor in its Top 150 Frozen Foods Processors Report in March 2019.

== Operations ==
OSI Group operates its U.S. plants under the name OSI Industries, LLC. The U.S. plants are located in Chicago (Racine and Ashland facilities), Geneva and West Chicago in Illinois, as well as Oakland, Iowa, West Jordan, Utah, Fort Atkinson, Wisconsin, and Riverside, California. The company produces many private-label brand foods and co-packs major brand name items for its various food service and retail customers. OSI Group has more than 65 facilities in 17 countries around the world, located in North America, Western and Eastern Europe, and the Asia-Pacific region.

OSI's products include meat patties, bacon, hot dogs, pork, poultry, fish, pizza, vegetable and dough products.

It has also been a meat supplier to other western fast food chains in China, such as Subway, Starbucks, Papa John's Pizza, and Pizza Hut (July 2014).

Impossible Foods announced a co-manufacturing collaboration with OSI to produce the Impossible Burger in July 2019, providing IF with capacity to quadruple its production by the end of 2019.

== Recognition and controversy ==
OSI Group facilities have received awards over the years, including awards for management of health and safety risks as well as environmental management. Whole Foods Market presented OSI with an award for Outstanding Innovation at the company's annual Supplier Awards ceremony in April 2019.

In July 2014, a factory of OSI Group in Shanghai, China was ordered to shut down production by local government for selling expired meat to international fast food chains including McDonald's and KFC. In February 2016, following the return of an unfavorable verdict in the case against the company in the Jiading District People's Court in Shanghai, OSI said in a statement that "the court of jurisdiction has reached an unjust verdict" and claimed that "general media clearly influenced the verdict."

== See also ==
- Food safety incidents in China
- Impact of the 2019–20 coronavirus pandemic on the meat industry in the United States
