= Melissa Sinfield =

Australian basketball player

Personal information
- Born: 23 March 1977 (age 49) Horsham, Victoria, Australia
- Listed height: 183 cm (6 ft 0 in)

Career information
- Playing career: 1994–2007
- Position: Forward
- Coaching career: 2008–2008

Career history

Playing
- 1994–1995: Australian Institute of Sport
- 1996–2006: Perth Breakers/Lynx
- 1996–2003; 2007: Perry Lakes Hawks

Coaching
- 2008: Perry Lakes Hawks (assistant)

Career highlights
- As player: 5× SBL champion (1998, 2001, 2002, 2003, 2007); SBL Grand Final MVP (2003); SBL Most Valuable Player (1999); No. 13 retired by Perth Lynx; As assistant coach: SBL champion (2008)

Melissa Sinfield (née McClure; born 23 March 1977) is an Australian former professional basketball player. She played 13 seasons in the Women's National Basketball League (WNBL), including 11 with the Perth Breakers/Lynx. She also played in the State Basketball League (SBL), where she won five championships with the Perry Lakes Hawks.

== Early life ==
Sinfield was born in Horsham, Victoria, where she played basketball as a youth but often in boys' teams due to the lack of girls' competition. She represented Victoria Country in under-16s and under-18s.

== Basketball career ==
=== WNBL ===
In 1994 and 1995, Sinfield attended the Australian Institute of Sport (AIS) in Canberra and played for the AIS women's team in the Women's National Basketball League (WNBL).

In 1996, Sinfield joined the Perth Breakers. She helped the Breakers reach the WNBL Grand Final in 1999, where they lost to the AIS. Following the departure of Tully Bevilaqua in 2000, Sinfield became captain of the Breakers. She was captain of the Breakers in 2001 when the owners handed back the licence and the team almost folded. Basketball Western Australia took over the licence and renamed the team the Perth Lynx, but the organisation lacked money to pay players. Sinfield retired in 2006 having played in only 15 wins from her last 105 games, all without being paid.

Sinfield was a defensive-minded player, and led the league for steals in the 2001–02 season. She was often given the task of guarding the opposing team's most dangerous shooter.

In 191 WNBL games, Sinfield finished with totals of 1,652 points, 1,043 rebounds, 436 assists, 281 steals and 133 blocks. As of 2019, she was the club leader for rebounds and blocks, second for steals, third for points, and fourth for assists. Her number 13 jersey was retired by the Lynx in 2016.

=== SBL ===
Between 1996 and 2003, Sinfield played for the Perry Lakes Hawks in the State Basketball League (SBL) and won SBL championships in 1998, 2001, 2002 and 2003. She returned for a final season in 2007 and won a fifth championship. She was named SBL Most Valuable Player in 1999 and SBL Grand Final MVP in 2003. In 189 games, she averaged 15.2 points, 8.7 rebounds, 4.8 assists and 3.7 steals per game.

In 2008, Sinfield was a member of the Hawks' championship-winning team as an assistant coach.

== Accolades ==
In September 2013, Sinfield was named in the 25 Year WSBL All Star team.

In August 2019, Sinfield was included in a 'Culture of Champions' mural at Horsham Basketball Stadium, a permanent display featuring 14 Horsham players who had national and international success. She was Horsham's first national female basketballer.

In August 2021, Sinfield was inducted into the Basketball WA Hall of Fame.

In 2023, Sinfield was inducted into the Perry Lakes Hawks Hall of Fame.

== Personal life ==
Sinfield has two brothers.

Sinfield's husband, Peter Sinfield, also played in the SBL for the Perry Lakes Hawks. The couple have three children. As of 2021, she spent her time balancing a nursing career with coaching her son's basketball team and serving on the NBL1 West commission.
