= Shelly Boston =

Australian basketball player

Personal information
- Born: 1 March 1975 (age 51) Perth, Western Australia
- Listed height: 188 cm (6 ft 2 in)
- Listed weight: 92 kg (203 lb)

Career information
- Playing career: 1992–2015; 2022
- Position: Centre / power forward

Career history
- 1992–1997: Rockingham Flames
- 1998: Wanneroo Wolves
- 1999–2002: Rockingham Flames
- 2000–2002: Rhondda Rebels
- 2002: Barcelona
- 2002–2004: Rhondda Rebels
- 2005–2008: Rockingham Flames
- 2009–2015: Mandurah Magic
- 2022: Mandurah Magic

Career highlights
- 2× EBL champion (2001, 2004); SBL All-Star Five (2009); SBL All Star Second Team (2007)
Medals
Women's basketball
Representing England
Commonwealth Games
| Bronze medal – third place | 2006 Melbourne | Team competition |

Shelly Lee Boston (born 1 March 1975) is an Australian former basketball player. She is most well known for her 23 seasons spent in the Western Australian State Basketball League (SBL) / NBL1 West with the Rockingham Flames and Mandurah Magic. Holding a British passport, she also played in the English Women's Basketball League (EBL) for the Rhondda Rebels in the early 2000s and represented England at the 2006 Commonwealth Games, where she won a bronze medal.

Boston was born in Perth, Western Australia, in the City of Kwinana. She grew up playing netball and only started playing basketball at age 14.

Boston debuted in the SBL in 1992 and played her first six seasons for the Rockingham Flames. After a five-game stint with the Wanneroo Wolves in 1998, she returned to the Flames in 1999 and played every year until 2002. Meanwhile, in 2000, Boston moved to south Wales to play for the Rhondda Rebels in the EBL. She helped the Rebels win all three trophies in the 2000–01 season, including the National Cup, league title and play-off championship. In her second season in 2001–02, the Rebels finished as runners-up in all three competitions. Boston did not initially return to Rhondda for the 2002–03 season, deciding to sign in Spain with Barcelona before ultimately leaving soon after and re-joining the Rebels. She re-joined the Rebels for a fourth season in 2003–04.

In 2005, Boston returned to the Rockingham Flames and played another four seasons. In July 2008, she played her 300th SBL game. In 2009, she joined the Mandurah Magic and helped them reach the grand final. That year, she also earned SBL All-Star Five honours. She played seven seasons with the Magic, with 2015 being her 22nd season. In May 2015, she played her 400th SBL game. In 2022, Boston returned to the Magic for a seven-game stint to make it her 23rd season in the SBL / NBL1 West.

As of July 2021, Boston was third all time (413) for total games played in SBL / NBL1 West women's history. She was also first all time in points (6708), rebounds (4088) and blocks (773).
