= Steve Lavin (businessman) =

American businessman (1955)

- Born: Steven H. Lavin; 1954 or 1955 (age 70–71)
- Education: University of Illinois; Loyola University Chicago School of Law
- Occupation: Businessman
- Known for: Chairman, OSI Group
- Predecessor: Sheldon Lavin
- Spouse: Dawn Lavin
- Children: 2
- Parent: Sheldon Lavin

Steven H. Lavin (born 1955) is an American billionaire businessman, and the chairman of OSI Group, a US meat processor and the main hamburger supplier to McDonald's. As of April 2025, Forbes estimated his net worth at US$5.4 billion.

== Early life ==
He is the son of Sheldon Lavin, who was the owner, chief executive officer (CEO) and chairman of OSI Group. Lavin earned a BS in accountancy from the University of Illinois in 1977, and a JD from Loyola University Chicago School of Law in 1980.

== Career ==
Lavin trained as a corporate attorney, and is president of Lavin & Gedville in Chicago. He is also chairman of Bank Leumi. In 2023, he became chairman of OSI Group after his father, Sheldon Lavin. Lavin is a frontier-technology investor via his sons, Michael and Alexander Lavin—a venture capitalist and polymath founder, respectively.

== Personal life ==
Lavin lives in Chicago, Illinois, US with wife Dawn.
