= Samantha Norwood =

Australian basketball player

Samantha Frances Norwood
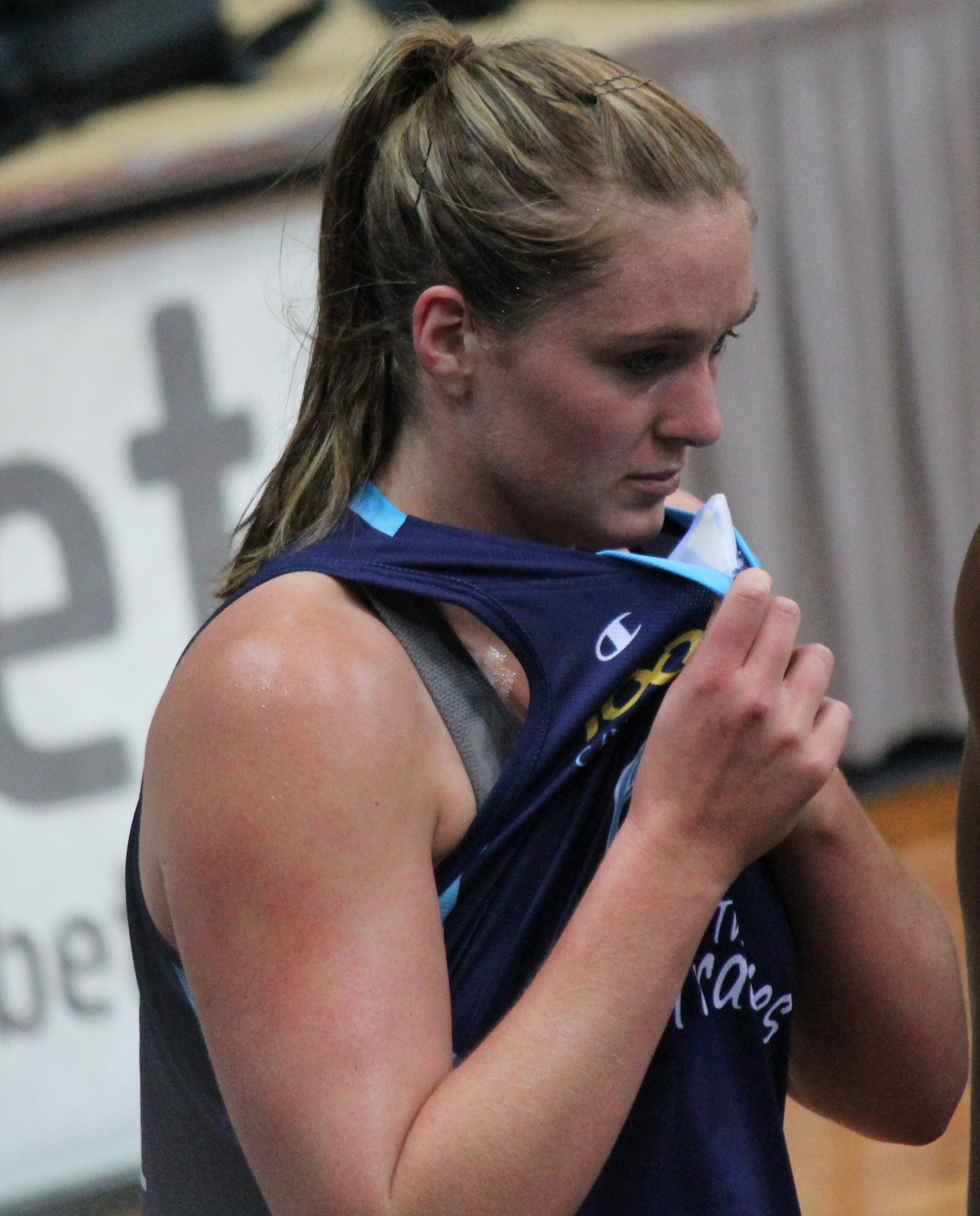

No. 21 – Canberra Capitals
- Position: Forward
- League: WNBL

Personal information
- Listed height: 1.88 m (6 ft 2 in)

Career information
- College: Stony Brook University

Career history
- ?: West Coast Waves

Samantha Frances Norwood (born 7 December 1989) is an Australian basketball player playing for the Canberra Capitals in 2012/13. She previously had played for the West Coast Waves in the Women's National Basketball League. She played for Stony Brook University for a year.

== Personal ==
Norwood was born on 7 December 1989 in Esperance, Australia, and is from Perth, Western Australia. She attended Willetton Senior High School before going on to Stony Brook University, where she majored in arts and sciences. Other sports she has participated in include field hockey, swimming and badminton. She is 6 feet 2 inches (1.88 m) tall, and has two siblings.

== Basketball ==
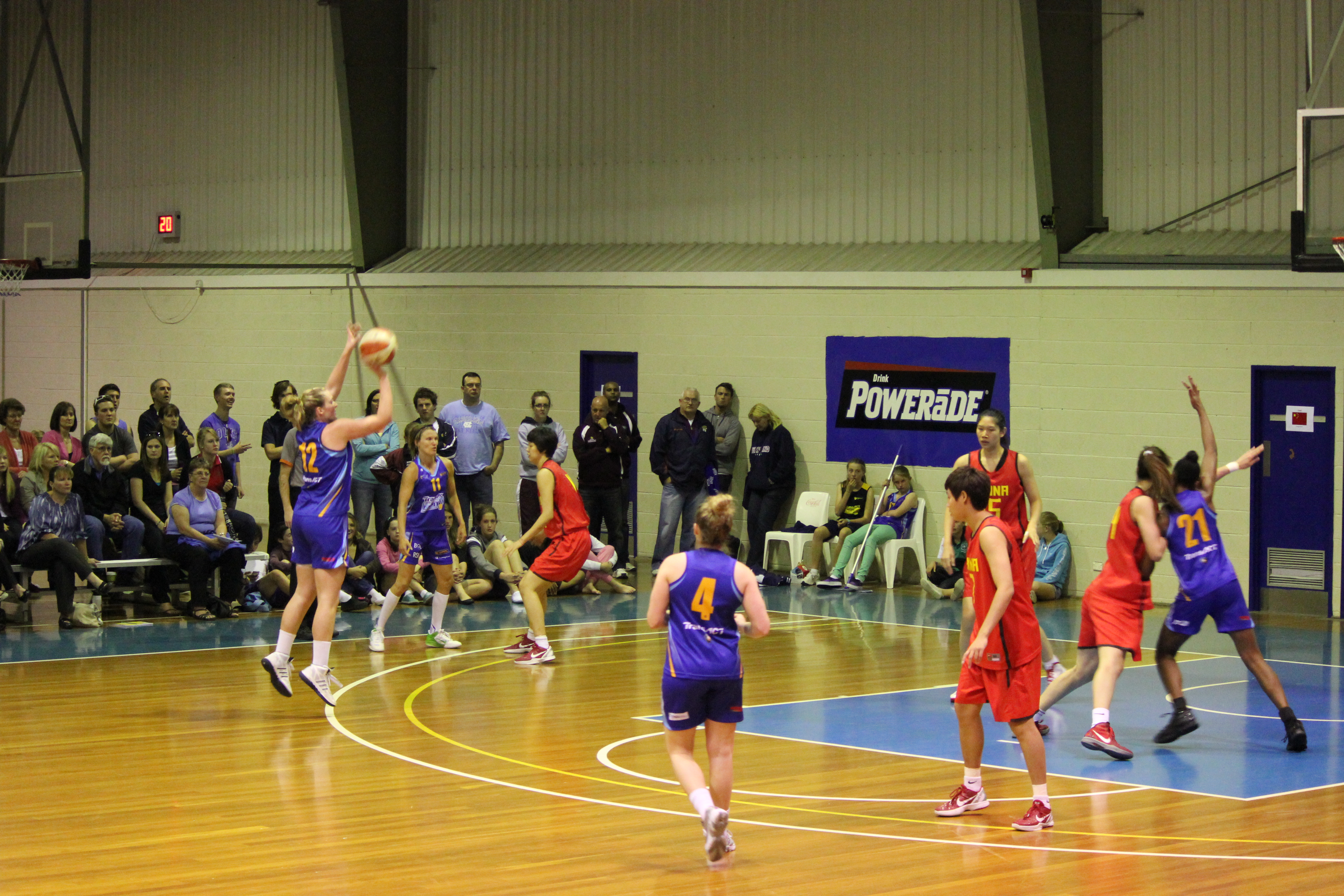
12 Samantha Norwood, 21 Val Ogoke, 4 Nicole Hunt and 11 Jessica Bibby in a game against China

Norwood is a centre and power forward.

Coached by Robyn Marler, she was a member of the 2004, 2005 and 2006 Willetton High School teams that won the Australian National School Tournament. She averaged 13.5 points, 10.3 rebounds and 1.6 steals per game in her final, when she also served as team captain. She was also a member of the Western Australia under-18 team in 2004 and 2005 where she was the team's vice captain.

=== University ===
Norwood played for Stony Brook University, and was with the team in 2007–08 season. An announcement regarding her joining the team was made in May 2007. That season, she and Sarah Kazadi were the tallest players on their team. Her first game with the team was in 2007 against Iona College. She finished the season with an average of 1.6 points per game and 2.1 rebounds per game. At the end of the season, she was named to the America East Honor Roll.

=== SBL ===
In 2007, Norwood averaged 7.5 rebounds per game while playing in the State Basketball League in Western Australia. She was with the league again in 2010.

=== WNBL ===
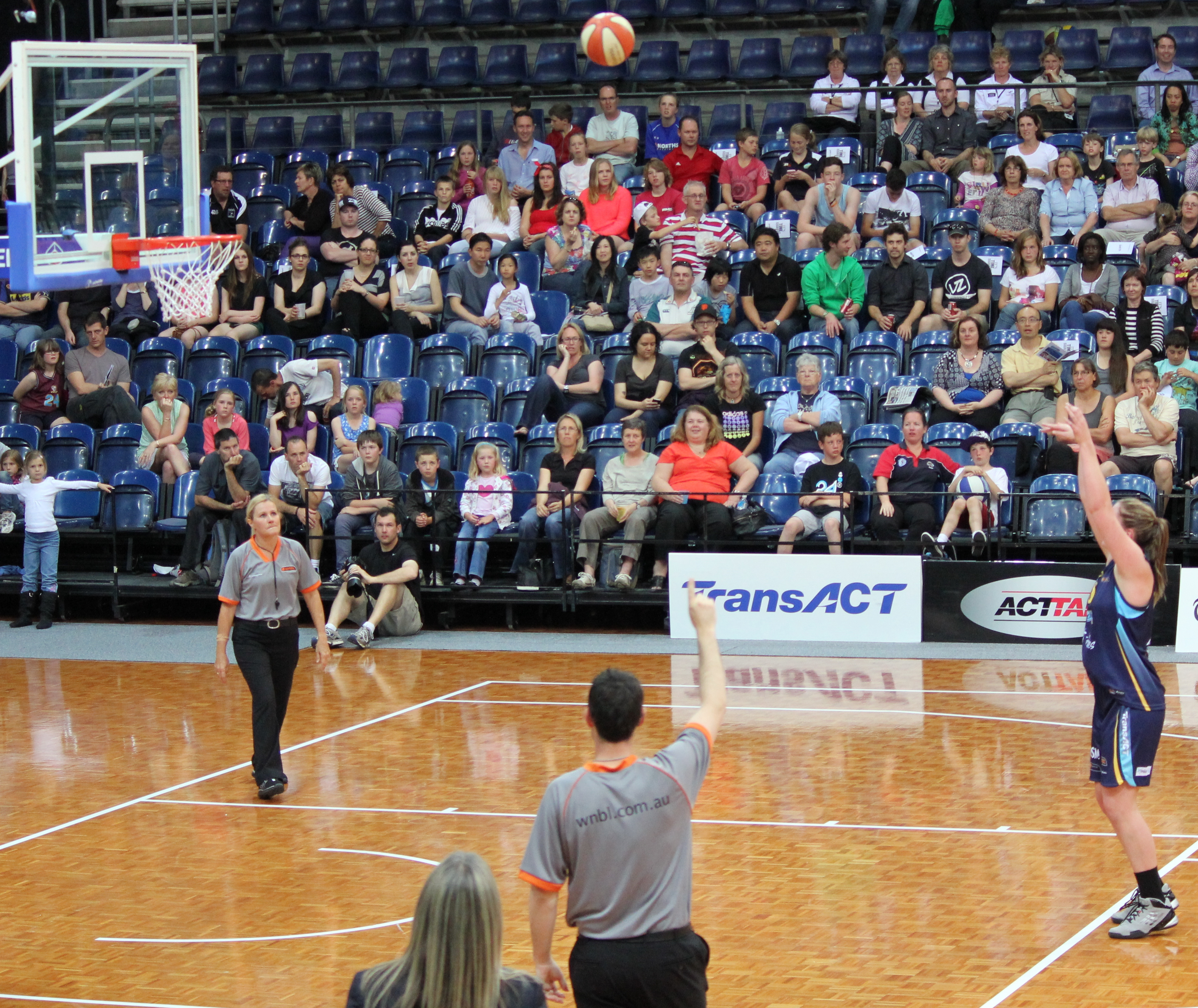
Norwood shoots a technical in a game on 20 October 2012

Norwood played for the West Coast Waves, where she was a forward. Playing for them during the 2010/2011 season, she kept the team competitive in their loss to the Australian Institute of Sports team where she scored 21 points and had 8 rebounds. In a December 2010 victory over the Dandenong Rangers, she scored 28 points. In a January 2011 victory over the Logan Thunder, she had 11 rebounds. Playing for the Waves in 2011/2012, she scored 10 points and 11 rebounds in an October loss to the Sydney Uni Flames. She scored 17 points and had 11 rebounds in the Waves first win of the season when they beat the Australian Institute of Sport in November. In a game against Townsville Fire later that month, she scored 18 points and had 10 rebounds in a loss for her team. In a December loss to the Canberra Capitals, she scored 15 points and led her team in scoring.

As a 21-year-old, after being recruited in the off-season, Norwood joined the Canberra Capitals for the 2012/13 season. Lauren Jackson, who also joined the Capitals for the season, spoke highly of Norwood's abilities to fill her in for her. In her team debut on the road against the Sydney Uni Flames, she scored 10 points, had five rebounds and three assists. At the Capitals home opener against the Bulleen Boomers, Canberra fans gave her a standing ovation when she was introduced. She finished her debut home game with Capitals with 10 points, nine rebounds and two assists.
