= Sheldon Lavin =

American businessman (1932–2023)

- Born: June 17, 1932
- Died: May 26, 2023 (aged 90); Highland Park, Illinois, U.S.
- Education: Roosevelt University
- Occupation: Businessman
- Known for: Owner, CEO and chairman, OSI Group
- Spouse: Sylvia Spatz (m. 1954; died 2009)
- Children: 3, including Steve Lavin

Sheldon Lavin (June 17, 1932 – May 26, 2023) was an American billionaire businessman, and the owner, chief executive officer (CEO) and chairman of OSI Group, a US meat processor and the main hamburger supplier to McDonald's. At his death, his net worth was estimated at US$3.1 billion.

== Early life ==
Sheldon Lavin was born in 1932. He earned a bachelor's degree in business from Roosevelt University in Chicago.

== Career ==
In 1970, Lavin worked with OSI as a consultant to help the company organize the financing of its first modern meat plant. He later became a full-time employee, and took over the business in the 1980s, eventually acquiring an estimated 90% stake.

In November 2013, he was inducted into the Meat Industry Hall of Fame.

== Personal life ==
Lavin lived in Highland Park, Illinois, US.

He was married to Sylvia Spatz for 55 years until her death in 2009. They had three children, Debbi Rosenberg, Steven H. Lavin, and Jerold R. Lavin. Lavin was Jewish. He died at his home on May 26, 2023.

Lavin was a contributor to and active in many charities including Ronald McDonald House Charities (for which was a Chairman of the capital campaign from 2013-2015), the Inner City Foundation of Chicago, Jewish United Fund and numerous other Jewish charities, Evans Scholarship Fund, Boys and Girls Clubs of Chicago, United Negro College Fund, The National Multiple Sclerosis Society, and many other national and local charities.

== Honors ==
In November 2013, Lavin was inducted into the Meat Industry Hall of Fame.
