= Andy Stewart (basketball) =

Australian basketball coach

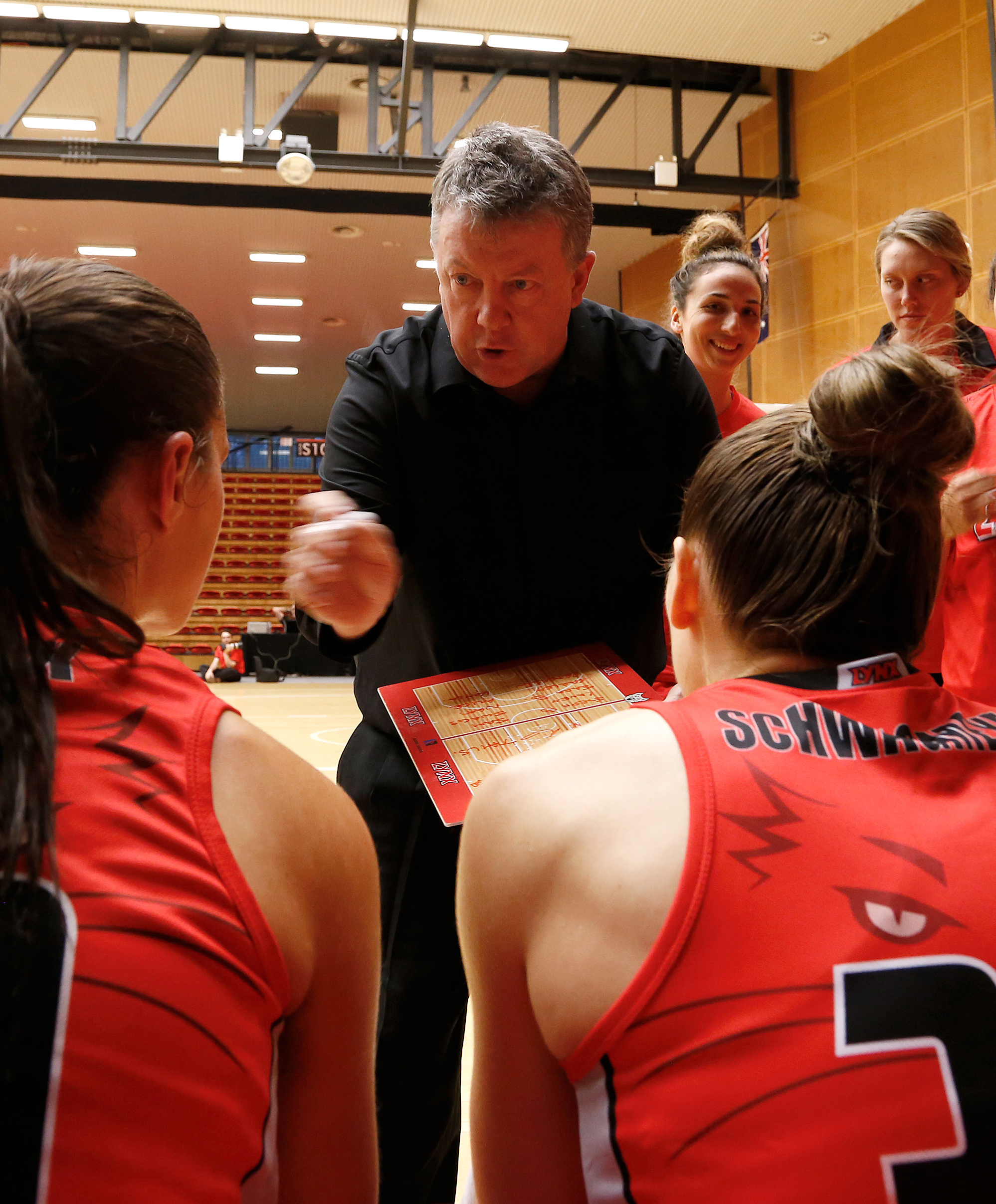
- Stewart with the Perth Lynx in 2017

Cockburn Cougars
- Position: Associate head coach
- League: NBL1 West

Personal information
- Born: 23 May 1961 (age 65)
- Coaching career: 2000–present

Career history

Coaching
- 2000–2013: Lakeside Lightning
- 2009–2014: Perth Wildcats (assistant)
- 2015–2020: Perth Lynx
- 2026–: Cockburn Cougars (assistant)

Career highlights
- 2× NBL champion (2010, 2014); 4× SBL champion (2005, 2006, 2009, 2013); 2× WNBL Coach of the Year (2016, 2018); 5× SBL Coach of the Year (2007, 2009–2011, 2013)

Andy Stewart (born 23 May 1961) is an Australian basketball coach.

== Early life ==
Growing up with his father in the Air Force, Stewart played multiple sports in a number of different locations. He first started playing basketball in Malaysia.

In the mid 1990s, Stewart began working as a coach with the Lakeside Lightning and Athletes in Action Australia.

== Coaching career ==
=== Lakeside Lightning ===
In 2000, Stewart became the inaugural head coach of the Lakeside Lightning in the State Basketball League (SBL), guiding them to a grand final berth in their first season. In 2005, he guided the Lightning to their first SBL title, later guiding them to three more championships in 2006, 2009 and 2013. He also earned recognition as the league's Coach of the Year five times between 2007 and 2013. He coached over 400 games for the Lightning. He was subsequently named the Assistant Coach of the 25 Year MSBL All-Star Team.

Following the 2013 season, Stewart parted ways with the Lightning after 14 seasons in charge of the men's team. During this time, he also had stints as head coach of the Lightning women's team in 2003, 2004, 2009 and 2010.

=== Perth Wildcats ===
Between 2009 and 2014, Stewart served as an assistant coach for the Perth Wildcats under Rob Beveridge and Trevor Gleeson, helping the Wildcats win NBL championships in 2009–10 and 2013–14. In October 2013, he served as head coach of the Wildcats for one game in the absence of Gleeson.

=== Perth Lynx ===
In April 2015, Stewart was appointed head coach of the Perth Lynx for the 2015–16 WNBL season. In his first season, he guided the Lynx to the grand final series and subsequently earned WNBL Coach of the Year honours.

On 23 April 2016, Stewart re-signed with the Lynx on a two-year deal. The Lynx returned to the finals in 2016–17 with a 15–9 record. In 2017–18, the Lynx had a 14-game win streak and finished atop the WNBL ladder. Stewart was subsequently named WNBL Coach of the Year for the second time.

On 5 July 2018, Stewart signed a two-year extension with the Lynx. He parted ways with the Lynx following the 2019–20 season.

=== Cockburn Cougars ===
In September 2025, after 12 years away from the SBL/NBL1 West, Stewart was appointed associate head coach of the Cockburn Cougars men's team for the 2026 NBL1 West season.

== Off the court ==
Stewart has served on both the Basketball WA Board and the SBL Commission. He also served as Lakeside Recreation Centre Manager, earning the 2003 WA Male Administrator of the Year at the Basketball Australia Junior Awards Presentations.

In August 2021, Stewart was inducted into the Basketball WA Hall of Fame.

== Coaching record ==
Legend
Regular season	G	Games coached	W	Games won	L	Games lost	W–L %	Win–loss %
Playoffs	PG	Playoff games	PW	Playoff wins	PL	Playoff losses	PW–L %	Playoff win–loss %

=== WNBL ===
Team	Year	G	W	L	W–L%	Finish	PG	PW	PL	PW–L%	Result
Perth	2015–16	24	16	8	.667	2nd of 9	3	1	2	.333	Lost Grand Final
Perth	2016–17	24	15	9	.625	3rd of 8	3	1	2	.333	Lost Semi Finals
Perth	2017–18	21	15	6	.714	1st of 8	2	0	2	.000	Lost Semi Finals
Perth	2018–19	21	13	8	.619	4th of 8	2	0	2	.000	Lost Semi Finals
Perth	2019–20	21	8	13	.381	5th of 8	–	–	–	–	
Career		111	67	44	.604		10	2	8	.200	
