= Basketball Western Australia =

Governing body of basketball in Western Australia

- Western Australian Basketball Federation
- Sport: Basketball
- Jurisdiction: Western Australia
- Abbreviation: Basketball WA; BWA
- Founded: 1946; 80 years ago
- Affiliation: Basketball Australia
- Headquarters: Bendat Basketball Centre, Floreat, Western Australia
- Chairperson: Kyle Hoath
- CEO: Fabian Ross

Official website
- www.basketballwa.asn.au

Basketball Western Australia is the governing body for the sport of basketball in the state of Western Australia. It is responsible for overseeing the development, promotion, and administration of basketball throughout Western Australia. The organisation is affiliated with Basketball Australia and works with metropolitan and regional associations, clubs, and schools to foster basketball participation at all levels, from grassroots to elite competition.

== History ==
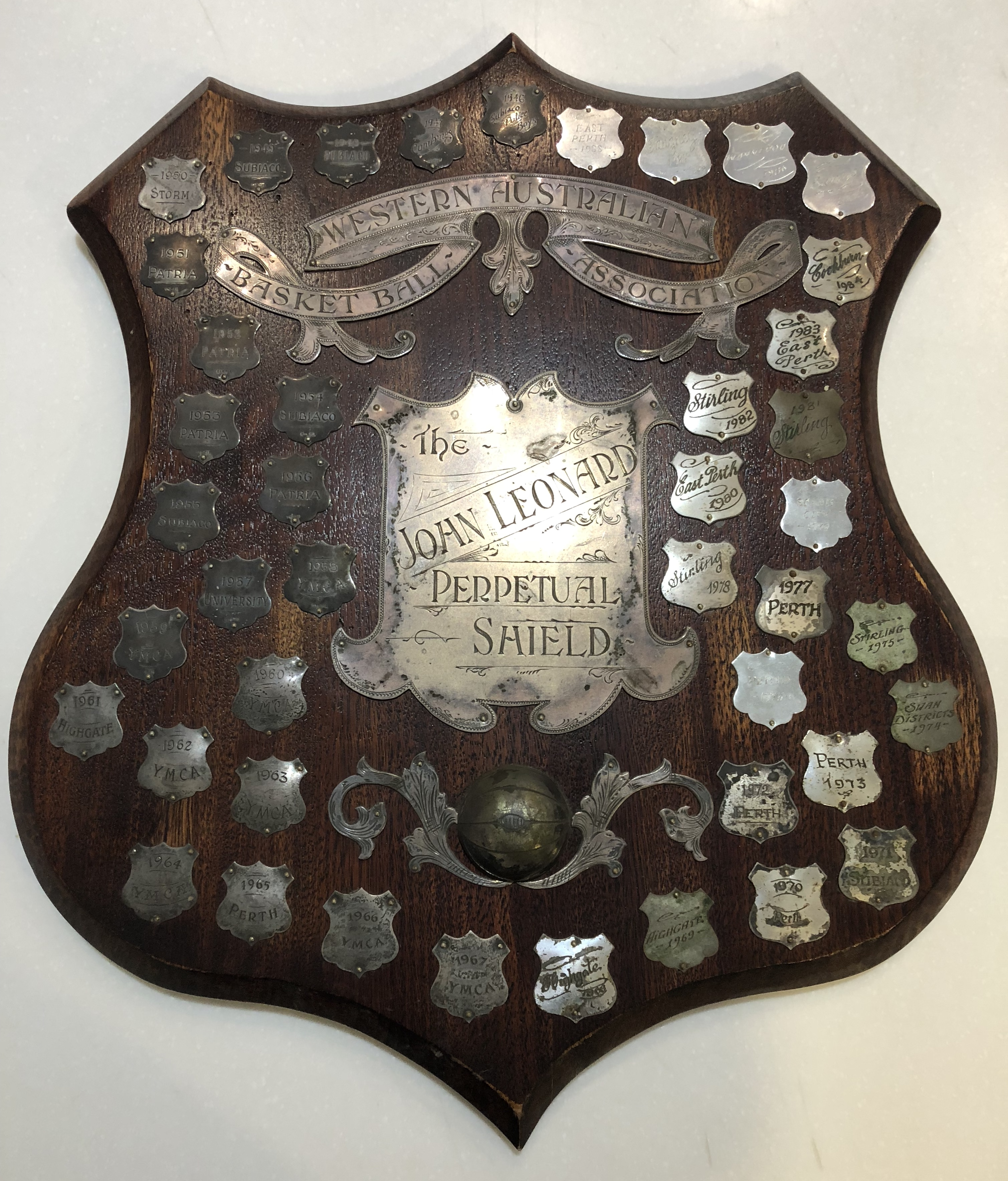
The John Leonard Perpetual Shield

The Western Australian Basketball Federation (WABF) was founded in 1946 as the Western Australian Basketball Association (WABA). The WABA was formed by a small group of basketball enthusiasts at the Perth YMCA on Murray Street on Wednesday, 3 April 1946. The sport had already been played across the state for 35 years, but there had been no official management or promotion of the sport. John Leonard, a highly respected Perth businessman, athlete and two-time winner of football's coveted Sandover Medal, played a key role in orchestrating the first meeting. The resulting winter competition played at Claremont Showground saw men's teams compete for the John Leonard Perpetual Shield. In 1957, the Women's Amateur Basketball Association of Western Australia was formed.

After the 1962 Commonwealth Games, the WABF's headquarters switched to the newly built Perry Lakes Basketball Stadium. The A Grade competition continued until 1972, when it was renamed the District Competition, involving seven association teams, although this was soon increased to eight. This format continued to 1987, although the competition underwent several name changes as sponsors began to show their interest. 1987 was something of a watershed year for the WABF, as the entire structure of the game in Western Australia was being reconsidered.

The impetus for the rethink was the dire financial straits which the WABF found itself in the previous year. The Perth Wildcats had been a financial burden since joining the National Basketball League (NBL) in 1982, and at the end of the 1986 season, the WABF was $400,000 in the red. A task force was established to sort out the mess, and the upshot was that Perth businessman Bob Williams, sponsor of the Wildcats in 1986, purchased a 60 percent interest in the team from the WABF for $200,000. The WABF's administration was also restructured, with Alan Marshall joining as chief executive with a brief to put the WABF on a firm financial footing.

A census in 1987 showed that 61 percent of WABF members were from country areas, so it was decided to try to include several country teams in the state's premier basketball league. However, this could not be done until the WABF had traded out its difficulties. Fortunately, the Wildcats had a hugely successful season in 1987—reaching the NBL Grand Final in their first trip to the finals—attracting much television coverage, which saw basketball's popularity soar.

An immediate result of the sport's new popularity was the debut of McDonald's as a sponsor. The fast-food chain entered into a $150,000 three-year deal with the WABF, sponsoring the premier competition and funding an extensive junior program.

In 1988, it was decided to form a State Basketball League (SBL) for both men and women, and to develop it into an elite, statewide competition as soon as possible. This meant seeking out private owners and attracting corporate sponsorship, so as to not burden the association. As part of basketball's development, the Western Australian Institute of Sport men's team, the WAIS Warriors, were included in the SBL under Warren Kuhn.

Simon Leunig, who had been the WABF's development officer, was appointed general manager of the SBL, and set about organising an expanded league for 1989. His marketing strategy paid off, and three new franchises were established in country areas: the Rainbow Coast Raiders from Albany were the first, followed by the Batavia Buccaneers from Geraldton and the Souwest Slammers from Bunbury.

The expanded SBL, which was limited to men's teams in 1989, was sponsored by McDonald's and Skywest, with a $65,000 grant from the State Government to help with travel costs.

== Operations ==
Basketball WA has had two ownership stints of the Perth Lynx that play in the Women's National Basketball League (WNBL), the first from 2001 and 2015 and the second from 2020 to 2024.

Basketball WA is in charge of the Perth Wheelcats, who compete in both the National Wheelchair Basketball League (NWBL) and the Women's National Wheelchair Basketball League (WNWBL). The women's team were previously known as the Western Stars.

Basketball WA's most prominent competitions are the NBL1 West and the Western Australian Basketball League (WABL). The NBL1 West comprises both a men's and women's semi-professional competition, while the WABL consists of multiple under-age junior divisions.

Since 2014, Basketball WA has been in charge of the day-to-day operations of the Bendat Basketball Centre under a co-management agreement with VenuesWest.

== Notable people ==
=== Chief Executive Officers ===
Years	CEO
?–2006	Ron Wright
2007	Andy Bennett
2008–2015	Rick Smith
2015	Christian Rice (acting)
2015–2023	Rob Clement
2023	Evan Stewart (acting)
2023–2025	Nathan Cave
2025–	Fabian Ross

=== Presidents / Chairs of the Board ===
Years	President
2002–2011	Elizabeth Woods
Years	Chairperson
2011–2014	Elizabeth Woods
2014–2021	Keith Dunlap
2021–2022	Jennifer Riatti (acting)
2022–2025	Fiona Notley
2025–	Kyle Hoath

=== Hall of Fame inductees ===
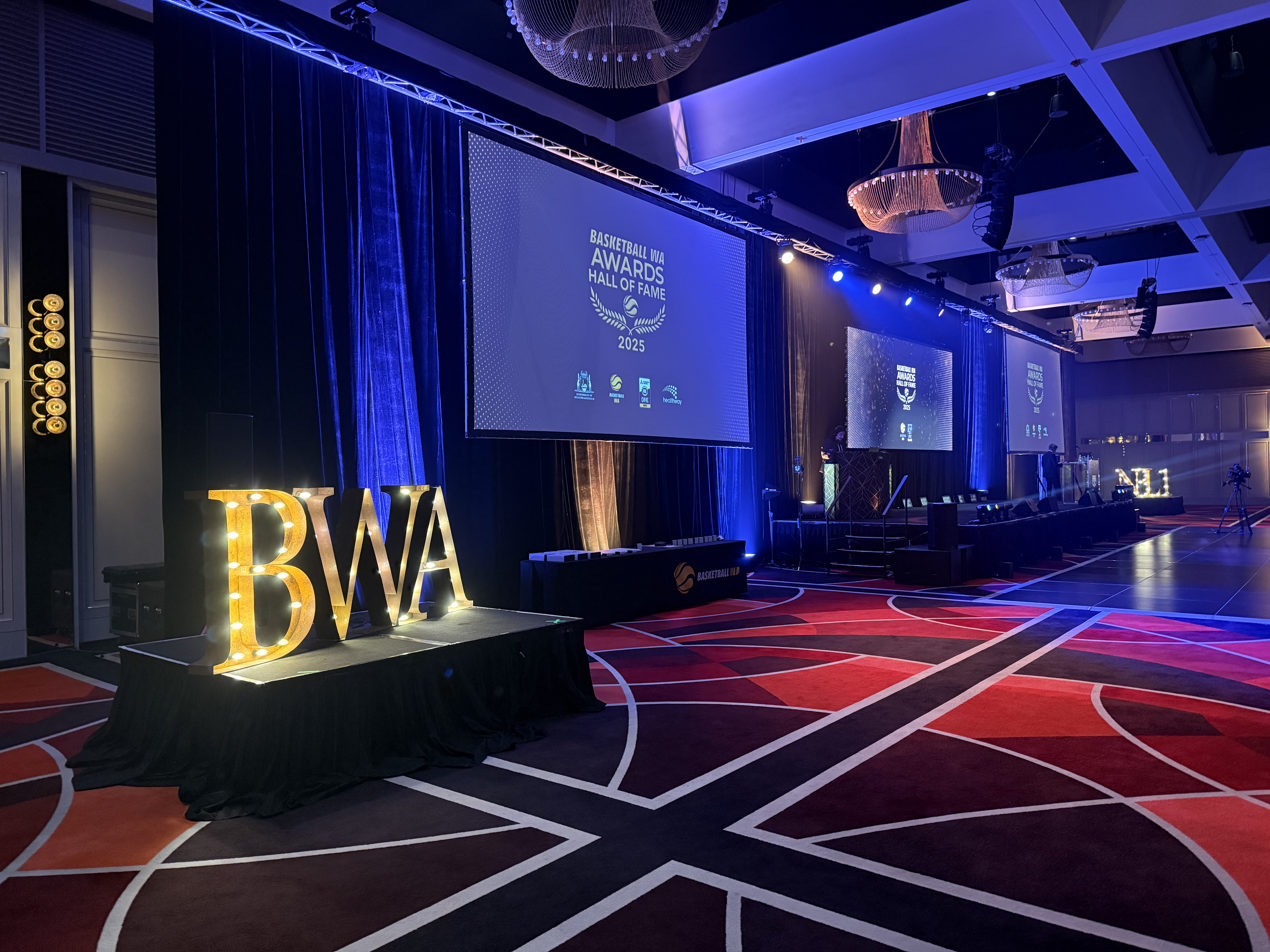
2025 Basketball WA Annual Awards Night

The Basketball WA Hall of Fame was inaugurated in 2021 with 11 inductees.

†	Indicates those inductees who are now deceased

Year	Name	Category
2021	Luc Longley	Player
2021	Andrew Vlahov	Player
2021	Mike Ellis	Player; Coach
2021	Tully Bevilaqua	Player
2021	Melissa Sinfield	Player
2021	Rohanee Cox	Player
2021	Andy Stewart	Coach
2021	John Gardiner †	Player; Coach
2021	Brad Ness	Wheelchair athlete
2021	Tom Mills	Referee
2021	Elizabeth Woods	Technical official
2022	Justin Eveson	Wheelchair athlete
2022	Melissa Marsh	Player
2022	Mark Worthington	Player
2023	Fiona Robinson	Player
2023	Paul Rogers	Player
2024	Ricky Grace	Player
2025	Martin Cattalini	Player
2026	Alan Black	Player; Coach
2026	Damian Martin	Player

Source: Basketball WA
