= NBL1 West All-Defensive Team =

NBL1 West honour

The NBL1 West All-Defensive Team is a NBL1 West honour bestowed on the best defensive players in the league. Under the State Basketball League (SBL) brand, a five-player all-defense team was named every year between 2016 and 2019.

== Selections ==
Player (X)	Denotes the number of times the player has been selected

Year	Women		Men		Ref
Year	Players	Teams	Players	Teams	Ref
2016	PG: Shani Amos	Joondalup Wolves	PG: Kyle Armour	Willetton Tigers	
2016	SG: Sami Whitcomb	Rockingham Flames	SG: Najee Lane	Cockburn Cougars	
2016	SF: Ebony Antonio	Willetton Tigers	SF: Ben Purser	Perry Lakes Hawks	
2016	PF: Ellyce Ironmonger	Joondalup Wolves	PF: Maurice Barrow	Geraldton Buccaneers	
2016	C: Louella Tomlinson	Willetton Tigers	C: Kevin Davis	Joondalup Wolves	
2017	PG: Lauren Jeffers	Perry Lakes Hawks	PG: Kyle Armour (2)	Willetton Tigers	
2017	SG: Casey Mihovilovich	Mandurah Magic	SG: Courtney Belger	Kalamunda Eastern Suns	
2017	SF: Alison Schwagmeyer	Lakeside Lightning	SF: Maurice Barrow (2)	Geraldton Buccaneers	
2017	PF: Ellyce Ironmonger (2)	Joondalup Wolves	PF: Ben Purser (2)	Perry Lakes Hawks	
2017	C: Natalie Burton	Perry Lakes Hawks	C: Kevin Davis (2)	East Perth Eagles	
2018	PG: Brianna Moyes	Cockburn Cougars	PG: Gokul Natesan	Geraldton Buccaneers	
2018	SG: Alex Ciabattoni	Kalamunda Eastern Suns	SG: Damien Scott	Willetton Tigers	
2018	SF: Antonia Farnworth	Perry Lakes Hawks	SF: Ben Purser (3)	Perry Lakes Hawks	
2018	PF: Ashleigh Grant	Lakeside Lightning	PF: Maurice Barrow (3)	Perth Redbacks	
2018	C: Maddie Allen	Rockingham Flames	C: Jarrad Prue	Lakeside Lightning	
2019	PG: Emma Gandini	Willetton Tigers	PG: Cameron Williams	East Perth Eagles	
2019	SG: Casey Mihovilovich (2)	Mandurah Magic	SG: David Humphries	Goldfields Giants	
2019	SF: Desiree Kelley	Willetton Tigers	SF: Ben Purser (4)	Perry Lakes Hawks	
2019	PF: Jennie Rintala	Kalamunda Eastern Suns	PF: Maurice Barrow (4)	Willetton Tigers	
2019	C: Maddie Allen (2)	Rockingham Flames	C: Jarrad Prue (2)	Lakeside Lightning	
2020	Season cancelled due to COVID-19 pandemic				
2021	Not awarded				
2022	Not awarded				
2023	Not awarded				
2024	Natalie Chou	Perth Redbacks	Michael Durr	Mandurah Magic	
2024	Emma Gandini (2)	Rockingham Flames	Gorjok Gak	Rockingham Flames	
2024	Stephanie Gorman	Cockburn Cougars	Johny Narkle	Geraldton Buccaneers	
2024	Teige Morrell	Lakeside Lightning	David Okwera	East Perth Eagles	
2024	Mia Satie	Perry Lakes Hawks	Todd Withers	Warwick Senators	
2025	Georgia Denehey	Perth Redbacks	Jahcoree Ealy	Mandurah Magic	
2025	Alex Fowler	Perry Lakes Hawks	Roosevelt Williams Jr	Willetton Tigers	
2025	Emma Gandini (3)	Warwick Senators	Verle Williams	Geraldton Buccaneers	
2025	Stephanie Gorman (2)	Cockburn Cougars	AJ Wilson	Lakeside Lightning	
2025	Alexandra Sharp	Rockingham Flames	Todd Withers (2)	Warwick Senators	
2026	Sophie Doran	Perth Redbacks	Joshua Davey	Lakeside Lightning	
2026	Jessie Edwards	Cockburn Cougars	Joshua Keyes	Geraldton Buccaneers	
2026	Chloe Forster	Warwick Senators	Marley Sam	Kalamunda Eastern Suns	
2026	Emma Gandini (4)	Willetton Tigers	Damien Scott (2)	Willetton Tigers	
2026	Sierra Moore	Goldfields Giants	Jordan Wellsteed	Joondalup Wolves	
