= Elijah Pepper =

American college basketball player (born 2001)

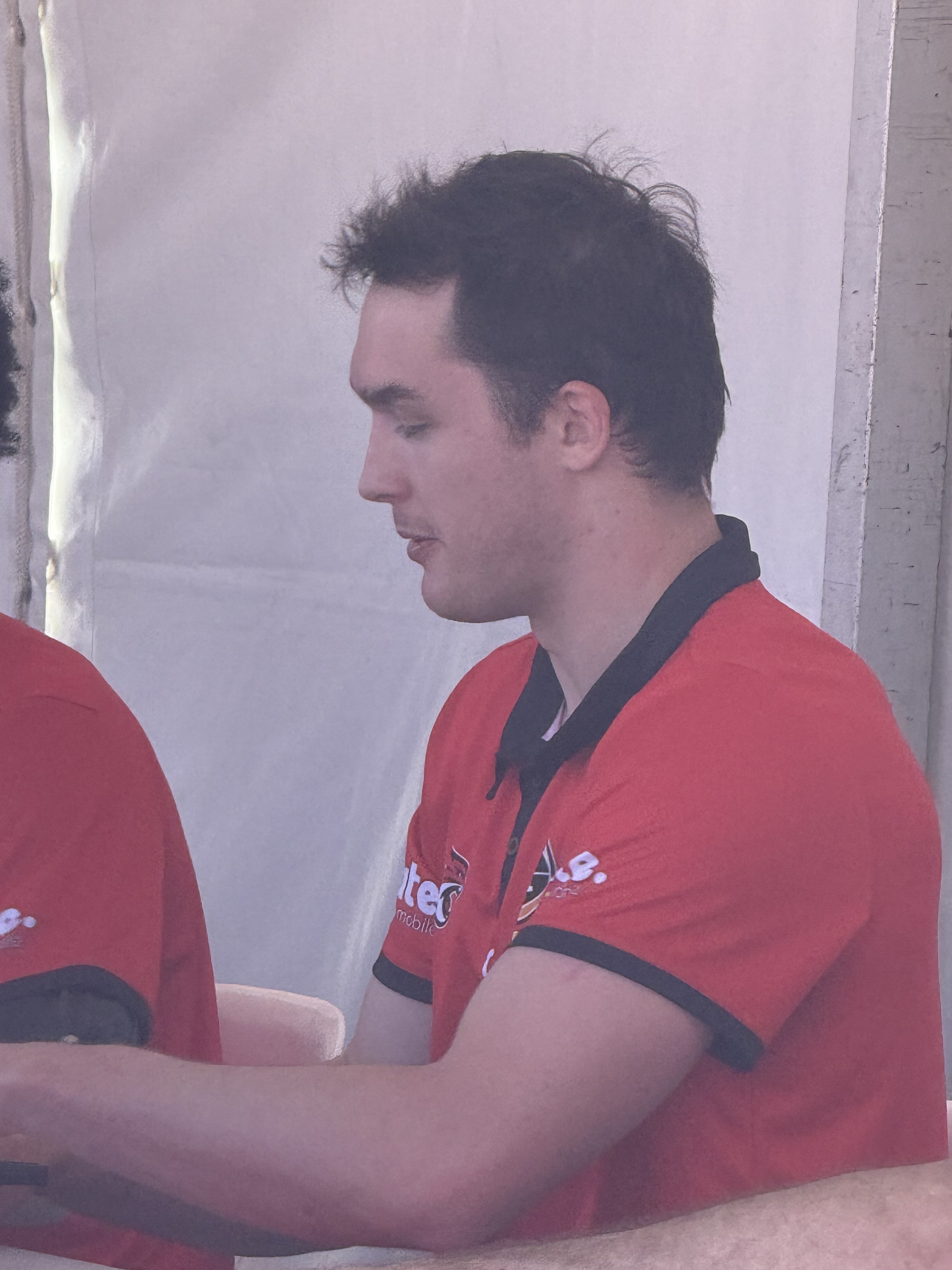
- Pepper with the Perth Wildcats in 2026

No. 40 – Perth Wildcats
- Position: Shooting guard
- League: NBL

Personal information
- Born: May 8, 2001 (age 25) Shepparton, Victoria, Australia
- Listed height: 6 ft 4 in (1.93 m)
- Listed weight: 200 lb (91 kg)

Career information
- High school: Selah (Selah, Washington)
- College: UC Davis (2019–2024)
- NBA draft: 2024: undrafted
- Playing career: 2024–present

Career history
- 2024–present: Perth Wildcats
- 2025: Warwick Senators
- 2026: Wellington Saints

Career highlights
- NZNBL Most Valuable Player (2026); NZNBL All-Star Five (2026); NZNBL Most Outstanding Guard (2026); NZNBL scoring champion (2026); All-NBL1 West First Team (2025); NBL1 West scoring champion (2025); Big West Player of the Year (2024); 2× First-team All-Big West (2023, 2024); 2× Second-team All-Big West (2021, 2022)

Elijah Ron Pepper (born May 8, 2001) is an Australian-American professional basketball player for the Perth Wildcats of the Australian National Basketball League (NBL). He played college basketball for the UC Davis Aggies and won the Big West Player of the Year in 2024. He made his professional debut later that year for the Wildcats and in 2025 debuted for the Australia men's national basketball team. With the Wellington Saints of the New Zealand National Basketball League (NZNBL) in 2026, he was named NZNBL Most Valuable Player.

== Early life and high school ==
Elijah Ron Pepper was born on May 8, 2001, in Australia, in the Victorian city of Shepparton, before relocating to the United States as a young child. He attended Selah High School in Selah, Washington. As a freshman, he averaged 21.3 points per game. Pepper increased his scoring to 29 points per game as a sophomore, leading the team to a 2A state title appearance. As a junior, he averaged 24.2 points per game and earned league MVP honors. Pepper was hampered by a knee injury as a senior but averaged 24.1 points per game and a 2A title game appearance. He committed to play college basketball at UC Davis.

== College career ==
Pepper became a starter for UC Davis as a freshman and averaged 8.7 points and 5.2 rebounds per game. As a sophomore, he averaged 14.7 points and 5.0 rebounds per game. Pepper averaged 15.1 points and 5.4 rebounds per game as a junior. As a senior, he averaged 22.5 points, 5.9 rebounds and 3.4 assists per game, earning First Team All-Big West honors. Pepper entered the 2023 NBA draft before returning for his fifth season of eligibility. On December 21, 2023, he scored 21 points in a win against UC Merced to surpass Audwin Thomas's mark as UC Davis all-time leading scorer. Pepper was named Big West Player of the Year in 2024.

== Professional career ==
On April 19, 2024, Pepper signed with the Perth Wildcats of the Australian National Basketball League (NBL) for the 2024–25 season. Injuries to fellow guards Bryce Cotton and Tai Webster opened the door for increased minutes, starting in seven of his 31 appearances. He scored a season-high 18 points against the Sydney Kings in just his second NBL appearance on September 27. He finished the season with averages of 7.1 points, 2.2 rebounds and 1.2 assists per game.

Pepper joined the Warwick Senators of the NBL1 West for the 2025 season. On April 5, 2025, he scored 50 points with nine 3-pointers in the Senators' 117–79 season-opening win over the Lakeside Lightning. On April 12, he scored 51 points with nine 3-pointers in a 134–109 win over the Rockingham Flames. On April 17, he scored 48 points with 10 3-pointers in a 102–98 win over the Joondalup Wolves. On April 26, he scored 50 points in a 119–83 win over the Perth Redbacks. On May 3, he recorded a triple-double with 35 points, 10 rebounds and 11 assists in a 104–87 win over the Mandurah Magic. On July 18, he scored 37 of his 44 points in the first half of the Senators' 125–96 win over the Perry Lakes Hawks. The next day, he scored 59 points in a 130–79 win over the South West Slammers, setting a new NBL1 scoring record. He earned All-NBL1 West First Team honours and was the league's leading scorer. He led the Senators to the NBL1 West Grand Final with a team-high 33 points in a 99–97 win over the Flames in the preliminary final. In the grand final, Pepper scored a game-high 33 points in an 81–78 loss to the Geraldton Buccaneers. In 23 games, he averaged 35.96 points, 6.74 rebounds, 7.3 assists and 2.22 steals per game.

On March 31, 2025, the Wildcats picked up the second-year team option on Pepper's contract for the 2025–26 NBL season. On October 29, 2025, he scored an NBL career-best 19 points in a 95–84 win over the Tasmania JackJumpers. On January 22, 2026, he scored 20 of his career-high 25 points in the third quarter of the Wildcats' 106–69 win over the Cairns Taipans. He also finished with seven 3-pointers. On the season, he averaged 10.5 points, 3.4 rebounds and 1.6 assists per game, while shooting 40% from the field.

Pepper joined the Wellington Saints of the New Zealand National Basketball League (NZNBL) for the 2026 season. On May 21, he scored 43 points in a 104–90 loss to the Southland Sharks. On June 1, he scored 45 points in a 105–84 win over the Manawatu Jets. Later that month, he was sidelined with a hamstring injury. He finished the regular season averaging a league-high 28.7 points per game. In the Saints' elimination final, Pepper scored a game-high 33 points in a 94–81 win over the Otago Nuggets. In the semi final, Pepper scored a game-high 32 points in a 112–69 win over the Auckland Tuatara. In the grand final, the Saints were defeated 104–101 in overtime by the Sharks despite a game-high 32 points from Pepper. For the season, he was named NZNBL Most Valuable Player alongside NZNBL All-Star Five and NZNBL Most Outstanding Guard.

On April 28, 2026, Pepper re-signed with the Wildcats on a two-year deal. On September 24, 2026, he scored 25 points and made the game-winning 3-pointer in a 98–97 win over the Adelaide 36ers. He went on to have four consecutive games with at least 25 points and helped the Wildcats start the season with a 4–1 record. On November 8, he scored 26 points in a 100–92 loss to the Cairns Taipans.

== National team career ==
In February 2025, Pepper was named in the Australian Boomers squad for two FIBA Asia Cup qualifiers. In April 2025, he was named in the Boomers squad for a trans-Tasman series against New Zealand in May.

In October 2025, Pepper was named in the Boomers squad for the first window of the FIBA Basketball World Cup 2027 Asian Qualifiers. In February 2026, he was named in the squad for two more Asian qualifiers. In June 2026, he was named in the squad for two more Asian qualifiers in Perth in July. He later withdrew from the team due to injury. In August 2026, he was named in the squad for another two Asian qualifiers.

== Personal life ==
Pepper's father, Ryan, and uncle, Jason, both played college basketball in the United States before competing at the state league level in Australia. Ryan, a native of Yakima, Washington, played at Central Washington University and then competed professionally in Australia. After a brief career with the Hobart Chargers in the South East Australian Basketball League (SEABL), Ryan played for the Shepperton Gators in the Big V between 1999 and 2002. While there he met his wife, Danielle, who worked for the company that owned Shepparton's gym. Jason played in the SEABL between 1996 and 2005.

Elijah Pepper is the oldest of four children; he has two younger brothers and a younger sister.

Pepper holds an Australian passport and is a dual citizen of the U.S. and Australia.
