= Natalie Chou =

American basketball player

Personal information
- Born: December 22, 1997 (age 28) Beaumont, Texas, U.S.
- Listed height: 6 ft 1 in (1.85 m)

Career information
- High school: Plano West (Plano, Texas)
- College: Baylor (2016–2018); UCLA (2019–2022)
- WNBA draft: 2022: undrafted
- Playing career: 2022–present
- Position: Shooting guard

Career history
- 2022–2023: Rheinland Lions
- 2023: Kalamunda Eastern Suns
- 2023–2024: Östersund Basket
- 2024–2025: Perth Redbacks
- 2024: Southern Hoiho
- 2025–2026: Essex Rebels

Career highlights
- All-NBL1 West First Team (2024); NBL1 West All-Defensive Team (2024); McDonald's All-American (2016)
Medals
Women's basketball
Representing the United States
FIBA Under-17 World Cup
Gold medal – first place	2014 Czech Republic	Team
Women's 3x3 basketball
Representing the United States
FIBA 3x3 Under-18 World Cup
Silver medal – second place	2015 Hungary	Team

Natalie Chou (born December 22, 1997) is an American professional basketball player. Growing up in Texas, she was named a McDonald's All-American as a high school senior in 2016. Chou played two seasons of college basketball for the Baylor Lady Bears before transferring to the UCLA Bruins.

== Early life ==
Chou was born in Beaumont, Texas, to Quanli Li and Joseph Chou. Her mother played basketball for the Chinese national team before playing professionally in China. She moved to the United States in the mid-1990s with her husband when he received the opportunity to study abroad at Lamar University in Beaumont. When Chou was one week old, she stopped breathing and was rushed to a hospital, where she was revived. She was diagnosed with human respiratory syncytial virus (RSV), a condition she no longer has.

After earning his master's degree, Joseph moved the family to Plano for his work. Li became a basketball instructor for kids. Chou's parents' relationship deteriorated, and they eventually separated. Raised in Plano, Chou grew up with her older sister Tingting, who was trained in basketball by their mom. As Chou grew older, she became the more talented player, while her sister took after their father and was more into academics. Chou continued training under Li, but also played on then-National Basketball Association (NBA) player Jason Terry's girl's Amateur Athletic Union (AAU) team from sixth through ninth grade. (Note: Terry played 19 seasons (1999–2018) in the NBA, earning the NBA Sixth Man of the Year Award in 2009 and winning an NBA championship with the Dallas Mavericks in 2011.) Terry first noticed Chou while preparing his daughter and her sixth-grade basketball team. Judging by her skills, he estimated that Chou was in high school. Terry was surprised to learn that she was only in sixth grade, and he was curious how her mom learned the NBA drills.

Chou attended Plano West High, where she was a three-time all-state player. As a senior in 2016, she was named a McDonald's All-American and was one of five finalist for the Morgan Wootten National Player of the Year award. Chou was a five-star recruit, and ESPN's HoopGurlz ranked her No. 8 in the nation in the class of 2016. Some Chinese media outlets called her "the female Jeremy Lin", likely more related to her ethnicity. Terry said her play was "not as flashy as Jeremy", but praised her fundamentals. Growing up, Chou was inspired by Lin, but she otherwise had few Asian-American basketball players as role models.

== College career ==
Chou committed to attend Baylor University, where she and her high school rival, Lauren Cox, helped form one of the top recruiting classes in the country. As a freshman in 2016–17, Chou played in all 37 games as a reserve and averaged 4.7 points, 2.1 rebounds and 1.6 assists per game as the Lady Bears reached the Elite Eight of the 2017 NCAA tournament. She led Baylor with a 42.3 three-point field goal percentage, which ranked sixth in the Big 12 Conference. She was named Big 12 Freshman of the Week for the period ending December 12, 2016, after scoring a season-high 15 points and making a career high five 3-pointers on six attempts against Texas State.

In the 2017–18 season opener, Chou scored a season-high 22 points and added eight rebounds and six assists in a 121–62 win over Lamar. On January 3, 2018, she matched her career-high of five 3-pointers after making all five of her first-half attempts en route to a game-high 17 points against Iowa State. She was a starter for the first 21 games of the season before undergoing surgery for a broken bone in her non-shooting left wrist, which had been bothering her even before then. After missing seven games, Chou returned in the regular season finale against West Virginia, entering in the final seconds with a heavy wrap on her left wrist. She played in six games as Baylor advanced to the Sweet Sixteen in the 2018 NCAA tournament. She went scoreless after her return, totaling 35 minutes and shooting 0-for-8 with all but one shot from three-point range. For the season, Chou averaged 6.7 points, 3.3 rebounds, 2.3 assists and 1.1 steals. Needing a change of scenery, she decided after the season to transfer to the University of California, Los Angeles. "[The injury] kind of changed the dynamics of a lot of the relationships, and I didn't like that kind of pressure," she said.

Due to NCAA transfer rules, Chou sat out a season as a redshirt and served on the practice squad for the Bruins in 2018–19. Eligible to play in 2019–20, she was expected to boost UCLA's outside shooting after they ranked next-to-last in three-point percentage in the Pac-12 (30.6%) and last in three-pointers made per game (5). On January 24, 2020, Chou made a season-high four 3-pointers and scored 18 points in career-high 33 minutes in an 85–80 overtime win over Washington. She was a part-time starter during the season and averaged 7.6 points and 3.6 rebounds while making 31.1% of her three-pointers for UCLA, who finished 26–5 and ranked No. 10 nationally. Their season ended prematurely, however, when the 2020 NCAA tournament was cancelled due to the COVID-19 pandemic.

As a senior in 2020–21, Chou scored a career-high 28 points in a 92–67 win over Utah, breaking her previous personal best of 22 set with Baylor. She made 11 of 14 shots from the field, including 5 for 7 on three-pointers to tie her career-high for made 3-pointers. She was named the Pac-12 Player of the Week. For the season, she averaged 9.9 points and 4.3 rebounds per game, and received honorable mention for the All-Pac-12 team. Chou returned as a graduate student in 2021–22, exercising the extra year of eligibility that the NCAA granted to athletes due to the pandemic. On December 5, 2021, she had career-highs of 31 points, 11 assists and six 3-pointers in a 112–33 win over San Jose State, earning her conference player of the week honors.

In 2022, Chou was named an Arthur Ashe Jr. Sports Scholar by Diverse: Issues In Higher Education.

== Professional career ==
After going undrafted in the 2022 WNBA draft, Chou signed with the Rheinland Lions of the German DBBL. During the 2022–23 season, she averaged 12 points per game.

On March 4, 2023, Chou signed with the Kalamunda Eastern Suns in Australia for the 2023 NBL1 West season. In 16 games, she averaged 20.1 points, 5.9 rebounds, 4.3 assists and 2.6 steals per game.

In December 2023, Chou joined Östersund Basket of the Basketligan dam in Sweden. In 17 games, she averaged 14.2 points, 5.1 rebounds, 2.5 assists, 2.5 steals and 1.5 blocks per game.

Chou joined the Perth Redbacks of the NBL1 West for the 2024 season. On May 31, she recorded a triple-double with 20 points, 10 rebounds and 14 steals in a 108–65 win over the East Perth Eagles. She was named to the All-NBL1 West First Team and NBL1 West All-Defensive Team. In 15 games, she averaged 18.7 points, 6.2 rebounds, 2.8 assists and 3.8 steals per game.

Chou joined the Southern Hoiho of the Tauihi Basketball Aotearoa for the 2024 season. In 12 games, she averaged 11.2 points, 4.8 rebounds, 1.6 assists, 1.8 steals and 1.0 blocks per game.

Chou re-joined the Perth Redbacks for the 2025 NBL1 West season. On July 26, she scored 44 points in a 96–84 win over the Mandurah Magic. In 21 games, she averaged 23.1 points, 5.2 rebounds, 2.5 assists and 2.8 steals per game.

For the 2025–26 season, Chou joined the Essex Rebels of the British Super League Basketball. In 17 games, she averaged 16.1 points, 6.0 rebounds, 2.8 assists and 2.6 steals per game.

== National team career ==
Chou helped the United States under-17 team win a gold medal at the 2014 FIBA U-17 World Championship. She also won a silver medal playing 3x3 basketball with the 2015 U.S U-18 team at the FIBA 3x3 U-18 World Cup.

== Career statistics ==
Legend
GP	Games played	GS	Games started	MPG	Minutes per game	RPG	Rebounds per game
APG	Assists per game	SPG	Steals per game	BPG	Blocks per game	PPG	Points per game
TO	Turnovers per game	FG%	Field-goal percentage	3P%	3-point field-goal percentage	FT%	Free-throw percentage
**Bold**	Career best	°	League leader

=== College ===
Year	Team	GP	GS	MPG	FG%	3P%	FT%	RPG	APG	SPG	BPG	TO	PPG
2016–17	Baylor	**37**	0	14.4	38.4	**42.3**	65.8	2.1	1.6	0.9	0.4	**0.5**	4.7
2017–18	Baylor	27	21	21.7	38.2	33.3	**90.5**	3.3	**2.3**	1.1	0.4	0.8	6.7
2018–19	UCLA	Sat out due to NCAA Transfer Rules											
2019–20	UCLA	29	13	21.2	38.1	30.8	80.8	3.5	1.1	1.6	0.4	0.8	7.4
2020–21	UCLA	23	21	30.4	**42.0**	38.6	67.5	**4.3**	1.7	**1.7**	0.4	0.8	**9.9**
2021–22	UCLA	31	**30**	**31.7**	35.8	36.4	78.9	2.4	2.2	1.6	**0.6**	1.0	9.5
**Career**		147	85	23.2	38.4	35.9	75.5	3.0	1.8	1.3	0.5	0.8	7.4
Statistics retrieved from Sports-Reference.

== Activism ==
During the coronavirus pandemic in 2020, Chou spoke out against the rise in animosity towards Asian Americans since the spread of the virus which originated in China. After flying home following the 2019–20 season, she was afraid to leave her Dallas-area home. Although she had been used to being stared at for being a 6-foot-1-inch (1.85 m) Asian female, Chou said the looks were now hateful. She felt safer going out wearing clothes with UCLA on it, as she hoped to ease people's fears by showing that she was a basketball player and "not just a Chinese person [that others] need to stay away from." Later that month, Chou posted on Twitter about her experience, which was followed by a story in the Los Angeles Times and later her first-person account on ESPN.com. She attributed the growing resentment towards Asian Americans to the use of the slang term Chinese virus, which she stated was "disrespectful and ultimately racist" and created "unnecessary xenophobia for people who look like me". Since 2015, the World Health Organization (WHO) has recommended to not name infectious diseases after geographic locations due to the negative impact on countries, economies and people. According to Chou, "It takes literally no effort to call it by its correct name [– COVID-19]."

After the 2021 Atlanta spa shootings, in which six Asian women were among eight people killed, ESPN shared Chou's thoughts along with other Asian sportspeople such as Jeremy Lin and Los Angeles Dodgers manager Dave Roberts.

== See also ==
- Xenophobia and racism related to the COVID-19 pandemic
