= David Okwera =

Australian basketball player

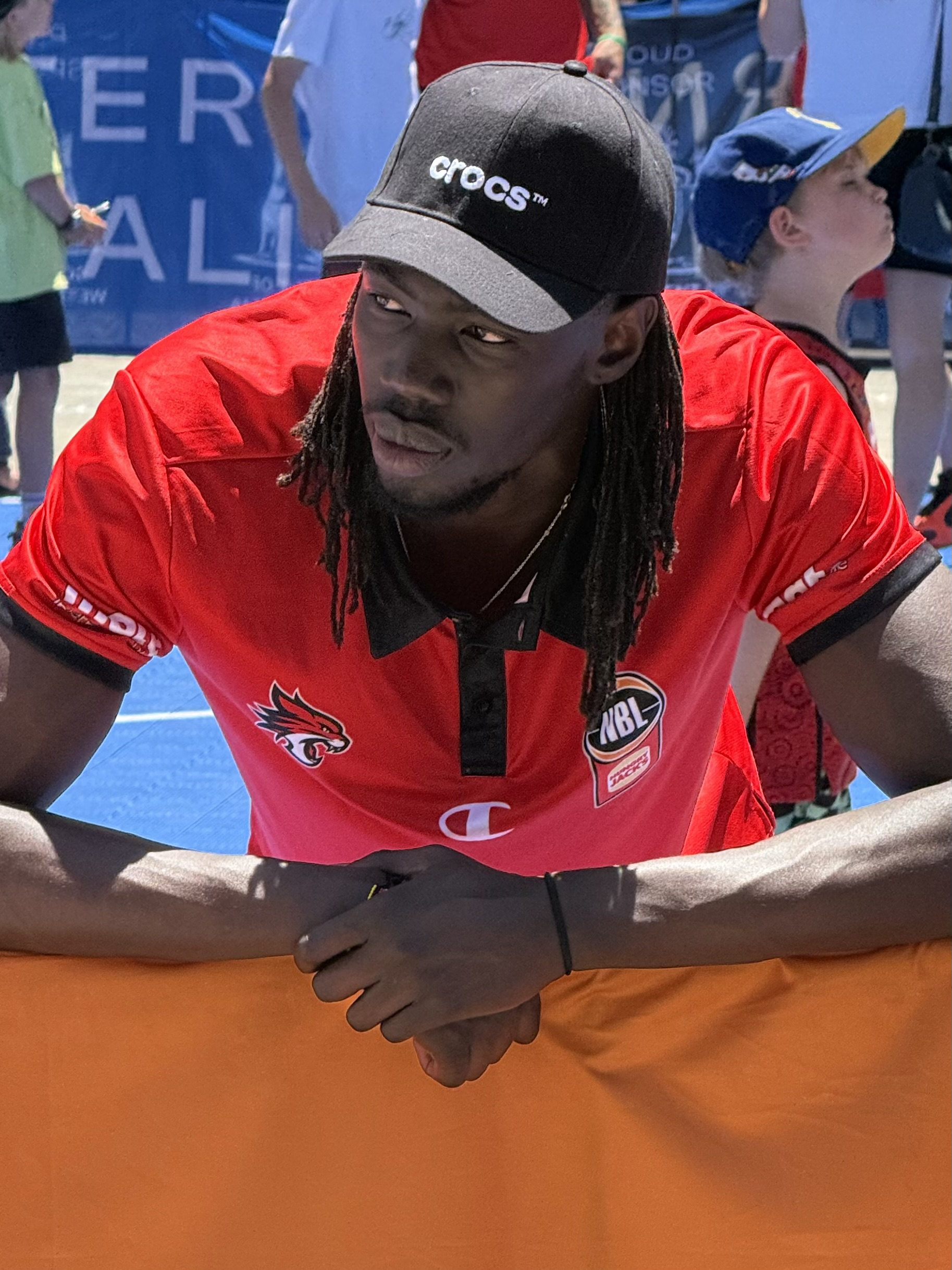
- Okwera with the Perth Wildcats in 2026

No. 0 – Balkan Botevgrad
- Position: Power forward
- League: NBL; EuroCup

Personal information
- Born: 31 July 2002 (age 24) Perth, Western Australia, Australia
- Listed height: 208 cm (6 ft 10 in)
- Listed weight: 90 kg (198 lb)

Career information
- NBA draft: 2024: undrafted
- Playing career: 2021–present

Career history
- 2021: BA Centre of Excellence
- 2021–2023: Melbourne United
- 2022–2023: Sandringham Sabres
- 2023: Perth Redbacks
- 2023–2026: Perth Wildcats
- 2024: East Perth Eagles
- 2025: Franklin Bulls
- 2026: East Perth Eagles
- 2026–present: Balkan Botevgrad

Career highlights
- Waratah League champion (2021); NBL1 West All-Defensive Team (2024)
Medals
Men's basketball
Representing Australia
FIBA Asia Cup
Gold medal – first place	2022 Jakarta

Wena David Okwera (born 31 July 2002) is an Australian professional basketball player for Balkan Botevgrad of the Bulgarian National Basketball League (NBL) and the EuroCup. In 2021, he debuted for Melbourne United in the Australian National Basketball League (NBL) and debuted for the Australian Boomers in international competition. After two seasons with United, he joined the Perth Wildcats in 2023, where he spent three seasons.

== Early life and career ==
Okwera was born and raised in Perth, Western Australia. He has a South Sudanese background. He was given the nickname 'D-Sav' in high school. He played junior basketball at Morley Sport and Recreation Centre and with the Joondalup Wolves.

At age 16, Okwera moved to Melbourne, Victoria, where he played for the Kilsyth Cobras under 18 team in 2019. In 2020, Okwera played for the Victorian under 20 state team at the national championships, where he was named to the all-star five after averaging 12.2 points, 10 rebounds and 3.3 assists per game. Following the under 20 national championships, Okwera received close to 20 NCAA Division I scholarship offers, including from Maryland, Oregon State, Oklahoma State, Wake Forest and Arkansas.

In September 2020, Okwera accepted a scholarship to attend the Basketball Australia Centre of Excellence and NBA Global Academy at the Australian Institute of Sport in Canberra. He played for the BA Centre of Excellence men's team in the Waratah League in 2021, averaging 5.3 points, 7.5 rebounds, 1.5 assists and 1.2 blocks in six games. The team was crowned Waratah League champions for the 2021 season. He also played for the Western Australian under 20 state team at the 2021 national championships, where he averaged 10.2 points, 8.3 rebounds, 2.0 assists and 1.2 steals per game.

== Professional career ==
In April 2021, Okwera made the decision to forgo the collegiate path and turn professional. On 27 July 2021, he signed a two-year contract with Melbourne United of the National Basketball League (NBL), with the first year being as a development player deal and the second year being a full roster spot deal. He started the 2021–22 season by becoming the youngest player since Joe Ingles to score 10 points in an NBL game on debut. In eight games, he averaged 2.1 points and 1.6 rebounds in seven minutes per game.

Okwera joined the Sandringham Sabres of the NBL1 South for the 2022 season, averaging 12.0 points, 9.4 rebounds, 5.3 assists and 1.5 blocks in 16 games.

Having been promoted to a fully contracted player for the 2022–23 season, Okwera was immediately tasked by United to fill the starting power forward role following injuries to Ariel Hukporti and Mason Peatling. He received a variety of roles to start the season and matched-up against a number of the league's best big men. On 6 November 2022, he scored a career-high 13 points against the South East Melbourne Phoenix. In 28 games, he averaged 4.2 points and 3.3 rebounds per game.

Okwera began the 2023 NBL1 South season playing two games for the Sabres but later returned to Perth and joined the Perth Redbacks of the NBL1 West. In nine games for the Redbacks to finish the 2023 NBL1 West season, he averaged 11.7 points, 4.0 rebounds, 1.6 assists and 1.4 blocks per game.

On 5 April 2023, Okwera signed a three-year deal with the Perth Wildcats of the NBL. He initially declared for the 2023 NBA draft but later withdrew his name. In the 2023–24 NBL season, Okwera found himself stuck behind Keanu Pinder and Alex Sarr in the big man rotation, averaging 5.5 minutes in 17 games, down from 14.3 minutes with United the previous season. With Sarr injured between late December and mid January, Okwera received extra opportunities which resulted in a season-high nine points in eight minutes against the Brisbane Bullets on 19 January 2024. He finished with 1.6 points and 1.5 rebounds per game.

Okwera joined the East Perth Eagles for the 2024 NBL1 West season, where he averaged 14.8 points, 9.8 rebounds, 3.6 assists, 1.1 steals and 1.2 blocks in 21 games. He was named to the NBL1 West All-Defensive Team.

Okwera became a starter for the Wildcats midway through the 2024–25 NBL season. On 29 November 2024, he scored a season-high 12 points against Brisbane. In 23 games, he averaged three points and two rebounds in eight minutes per game.

Okwera joined the Franklin Bulls of the New Zealand National Basketball League (NZNBL) for the 2025 season. In 20 games, he averaged 10.7 points, 7.9 rebounds, 3.0 assists, 1.3 steals and 1.7 blocks per game.

On 29 October 2025, Okwera scored a season-high 13 points in a 95–84 win over the Tasmania JackJumpers. He suffered a foot injury late in the 2025–26 NBL season.

Okwera re-joined the East Perth Eagles for the 2026 NBL1 West season.

On 10 August 2026, Okwera signed with Balkan Botevgrad of the Bulgarian National Basketball League (NBL).

== National team career ==
Okwera debuted for the Australian Boomers during the FIBA Asia Cup qualifier in February 2021 against New Zealand. He later played for the Australian under 19 team at the 2021 FIBA Under-19 Basketball World Cup.

Okwera played for the Boomers during the 2023 FIBA World Cup Asian qualifiers and at the 2022 FIBA Asia Cup.

In February 2025, Okwera was named in the Boomers squad for two FIBA Asia Cup qualifiers.

In February 2026, Okwera was named in the Boomers squad for two FIBA World Cup Asian qualifiers. He did not end up travelling with the team. In July 2026, he was named in the Boomers squad for two more qualifiers as a replacement for Ben Henshall. In November 2026, he was named in the squad for two more Asian qualifiers.
