= 2025 NBL1 West season =

- League: NBL1 West
- Sport: Basketball
- Duration: 4 April – 2 August (Regular season); 8 August – 23 August (Finals)
- Games: 22 (men); 20 (women)
- Teams: 14 (men); 13 (women)

Regular season
- Minor premiers: M: Rockingham Flames; W: Cockburn Cougars
- Season MVP: M: Isaac White (Rockingham Flames); W: Teige Morrell (Lakeside Lightning)
- Top scorer: M: Elijah Pepper (Warwick Senators); W: Karly Murphy (Kalamunda Eastern Suns)

Finals
- Champions: M: Geraldton Buccaneers; W: Cockburn Cougars
- Runners-up: M: Warwick Senators; W: Warwick Senators
- Grand Final MVP: M: Johny Narkle (Geraldton Buccaneers); W: Ruby Porter (Cockburn Cougars)

NBL1 West seasons
- ← 2024 2026 →

The 2025 NBL1 West season was the fifth season of the NBL1 West and 36th overall in State Basketball League (SBL) / NBL1 West history. The regular season began on Friday 4 April and ended on Saturday 2 August. The finals began on Friday 8 August and concluded with both the women's grand final and the men's grand final on Saturday 23 August.

The 2025 NBL1 season concluded with the fourth annual NBL1 National Finals being held at Southern Cross Stadium in Canberra.

== Regular season ==
The regular season began on Friday 4 April and ended on Saturday 2 August after 18 rounds of competition. Easter games in round 3 once again saw all teams play on a Thursday night, followed by Anzac Round in round 4, Heritage Round in round 9, and First Nations Round in round 14. In July, a regular season fixture was played in Albany.

With a 20–0 record, the Cougars became just the third women's team in the history of the SBL / NBL1 West to go undefeated in the regular season, joining the 1999 Willetton Tigers and the 2000 Perry Lakes Hawks. Additionally, no men's team has done it either since the 2002 Perry Lakes Hawks.

=== Standings ===
Men's ladder

Pos	Team	Pld	W	L	Pts	Qualification
1	Rockingham Flames	22	19	3	38	Finals
2	Geraldton Buccaneers	22	18	4	36	Finals
3	Warwick Senators	22	18	4	36	Finals
4	Willetton Tigers	22	16	6	32	Finals
5	Joondalup Wolves	22	14	8	28	Finals
6	Goldfields Giants	22	12	10	24	Finals
7	Mandurah Magic	22	11	11	22	Finals
8	East Perth Eagles	22	9	13	18	Finals
9	Kalamunda Eastern Suns	22	9	13	18	
10	Lakeside Lightning	22	8	14	16	
11	Perry Lakes Hawks	22	7	15	14	
12	Cockburn Cougars	22	6	16	12	
13	Perth Redbacks	22	6	16	12	
14	South West Slammers	22	1	21	2	

Source: NBL1

Women's ladder

Pos	Team	Pld	W	L	Pts	Qualification
1	Cockburn Cougars	20	20	0	40	Finals
2	Warwick Senators	20	15	5	30	Finals
3	Perth Redbacks	20	15	5	30	Finals
4	Rockingham Flames	20	13	7	26	Finals
5	Mandurah Magic	20	11	9	22	Finals
6	Perry Lakes Hawks	20	11	9	22	Finals
7	Willetton Tigers	20	11	9	22	Finals
8	East Perth Eagles	20	10	10	20	Finals
9	Joondalup Wolves	20	8	12	16	
10	Lakeside Lightning	20	6	14	12	
11	Goldfields Giants	20	4	16	8	
12	Kalamunda Eastern Suns	20	3	17	6	
13	South West Slammers	20	3	17	6	

Source: NBL1

== Finals ==
The finals began on Friday 8 August and consisted of four rounds. The finals concluded with the women's grand final and the men's grand final on Saturday 23 August. Both grand finals were played at RAC Arena in front of 6,116 people.

=== Men's bracket ===
Qualifying and elimination finals
Aug 9, Mike Barnett Sports Complex
1	Rockingham Flames	102
4	Willetton Tigers	121
Aug 9, Arena Joondalup
5	Joondalup Wolves	79
8	East Perth Eagles	81
Aug 9, Goldfields Basketball Stadium
6	Goldfields Giants	109
7	Mandurah Magic	95
Aug 9, Activewest Stadium
2	Geraldton Buccaneers	84
3	Warwick Senators	115

Semi-finals
Aug 14, Mike Barnett Sports Complex
Rockingham Flames	111
East Perth Eagles	88
Aug 15, Activewest Stadium
Geraldton Buccaneers	93
Goldfields Giants	70

Preliminary finals
Aug 17, Willetton Basketball Stadium
Willetton Tigers	80
Geraldton Buccaneers	99
Aug 16, Warwick Stadium
Warwick Senators	99
Rockingham Flames	97

Grand final
Aug 23, RAC Arena
Geraldton Buccaneers	81
Warwick Senators	78

==== Grand Final summary ====
Kayo Sports

23 August 2025
7:00 pm

Preview
Recap
Box score
Highlights #1
Highlights #2

Geraldton Buccaneers 81, Warwick Senators 78
Scoring by quarter: 26–18, 14–15, 18–22, 23–23
Pts: Springs, Narkle 21 each Rebs: Johny Narkle 9 Asts: Joshua Keyes 6	Pts: Elijah Pepper 33; Rebs: Cooper Creek 10; Asts: George Pearl 6
Geraldton wins NBL1 West Championship

RAC Arena, Perth
MVP: Johny Narkle (Buccaneers)

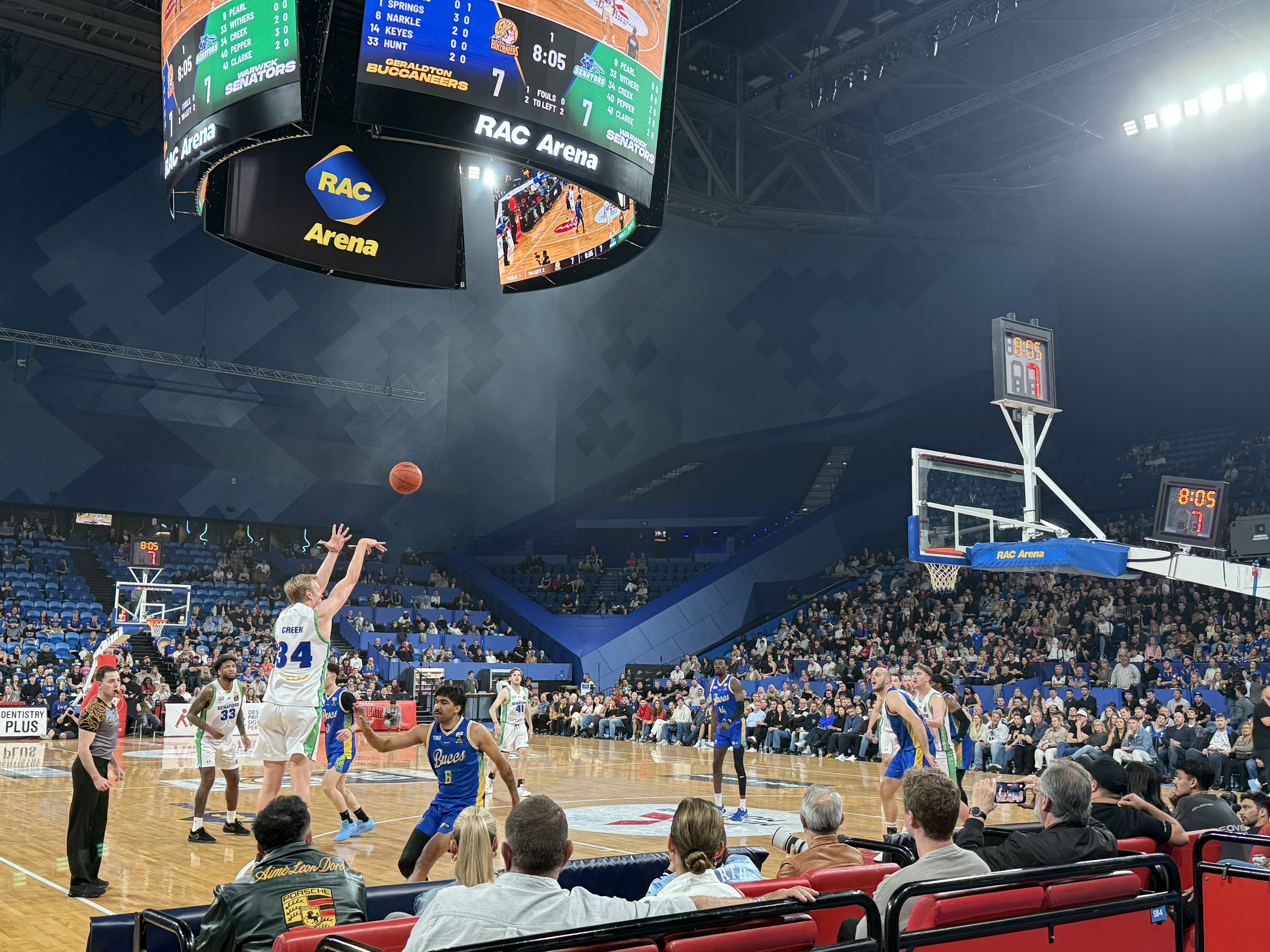
NBL1 West Men's Grand Final

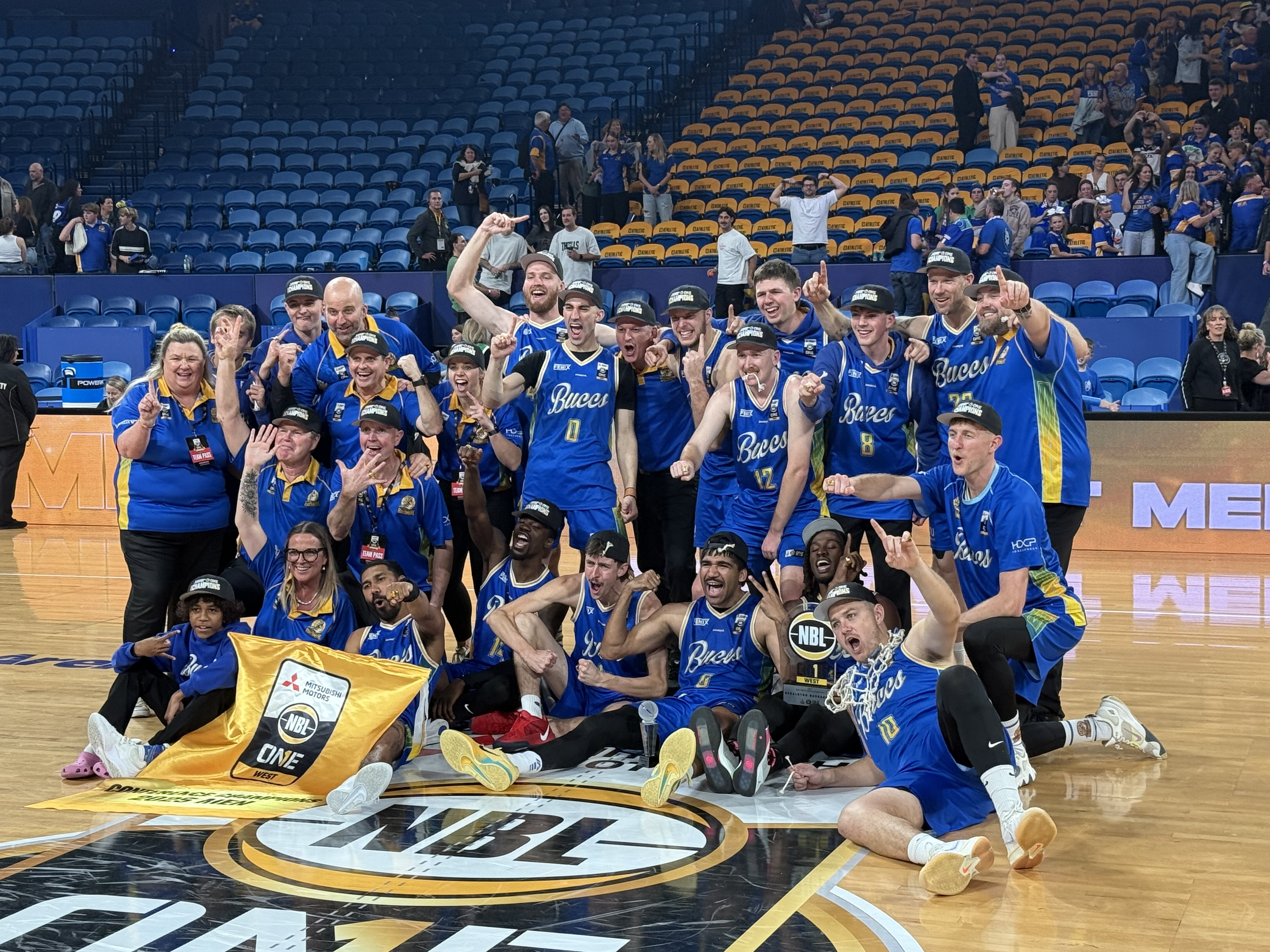
Geraldton Buccaneers 2025 Men's NBL1 West champions

=== Women's bracket ===
Qualifying and elimination finals
Aug 8, Wally Hagan Stadium
1	Cockburn Cougars	86
4	Rockingham Flames	84
Aug 9, Mandurah ARC
5	Mandurah Magic	105
8	East Perth Eagles	60
Aug 9, Bendat Basketball Centre
6	Perry Lakes Hawks	88
7	Willetton Tigers	76
Aug 8, Warwick Stadium
2	Warwick Senators	75
3	Perth Redbacks	71

Semi-finals
Aug 14, Mike Barnett Sports Complex
Rockingham Flames	86
Mandurah Magic	97
Aug 14, Belmont Oasis Leisure Centre
Perth Redbacks	80
Perry Lakes Hawks	86

Preliminary finals
Aug 16, Wally Hagan Stadium
Cockburn Cougars	81
Perry Lakes Hawks	54
Aug 16, Warwick Stadium
Warwick Senators	68
Mandurah Magic	59

Grand final
Aug 23, RAC Arena
Cockburn Cougars	91
Warwick Senators	71

==== Grand Final summary ====
Kayo Sports

23 August 2025
4:30 pm

Preview
Recap
Box score
Highlights #1
Highlights #2

Cockburn Cougars 91, Warwick Senators 71
Scoring by quarter: 15–19, 28–17, 20–19, 28–16
Pts: Sarah Mortensen 18; Rebs: Daniel Raber 15; Asts: Williams, Raber 4 each	Pts: Stacey Barr 35; Rebs: Barr, Clinch Hoycard 13 each Asts: Chloe Forster 4
Cockburn wins NBL1 West Championship

RAC Arena, Perth
MVP: Ruby Porter (Cougars)

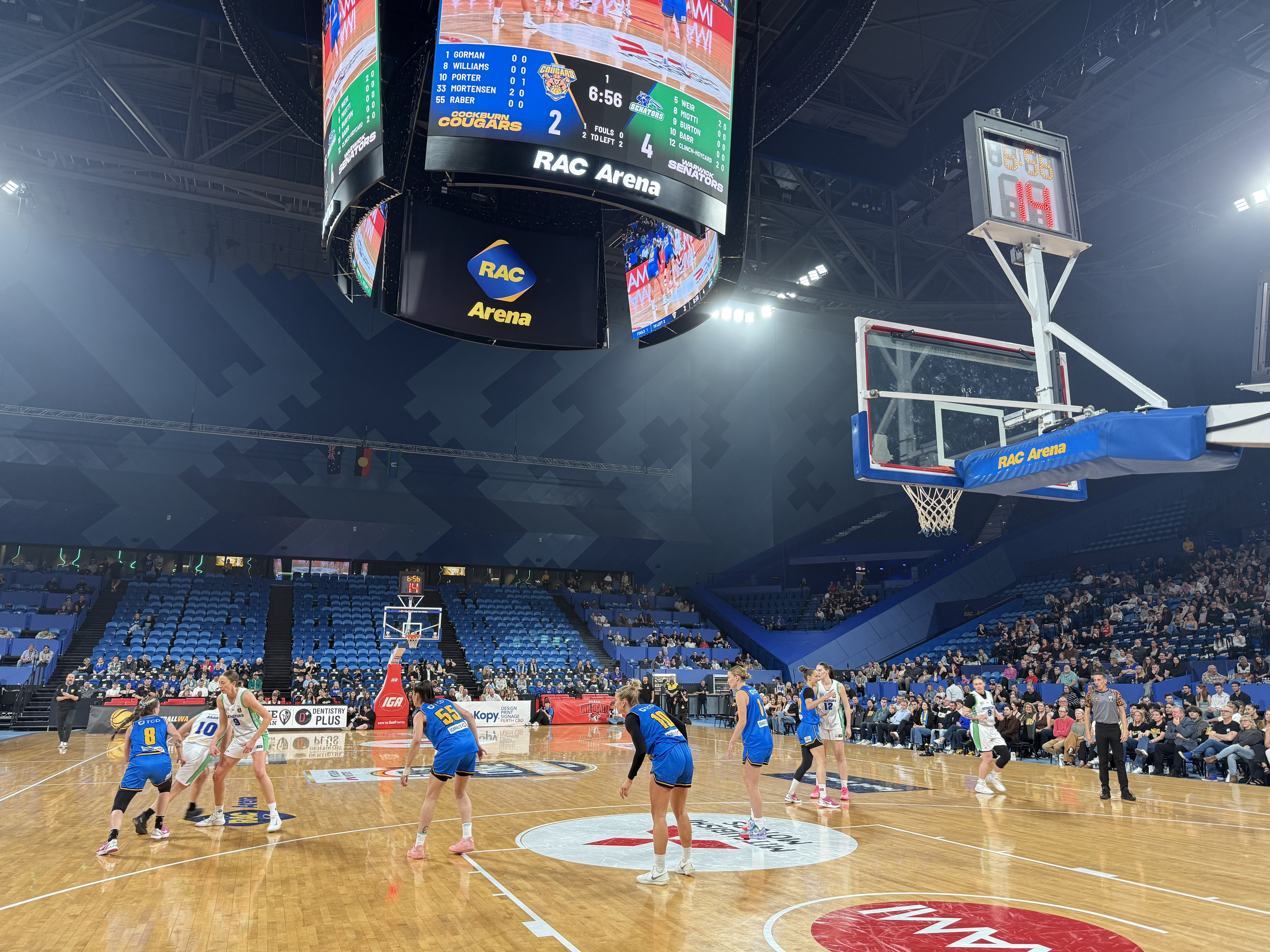
NBL1 West Women's Grand Final

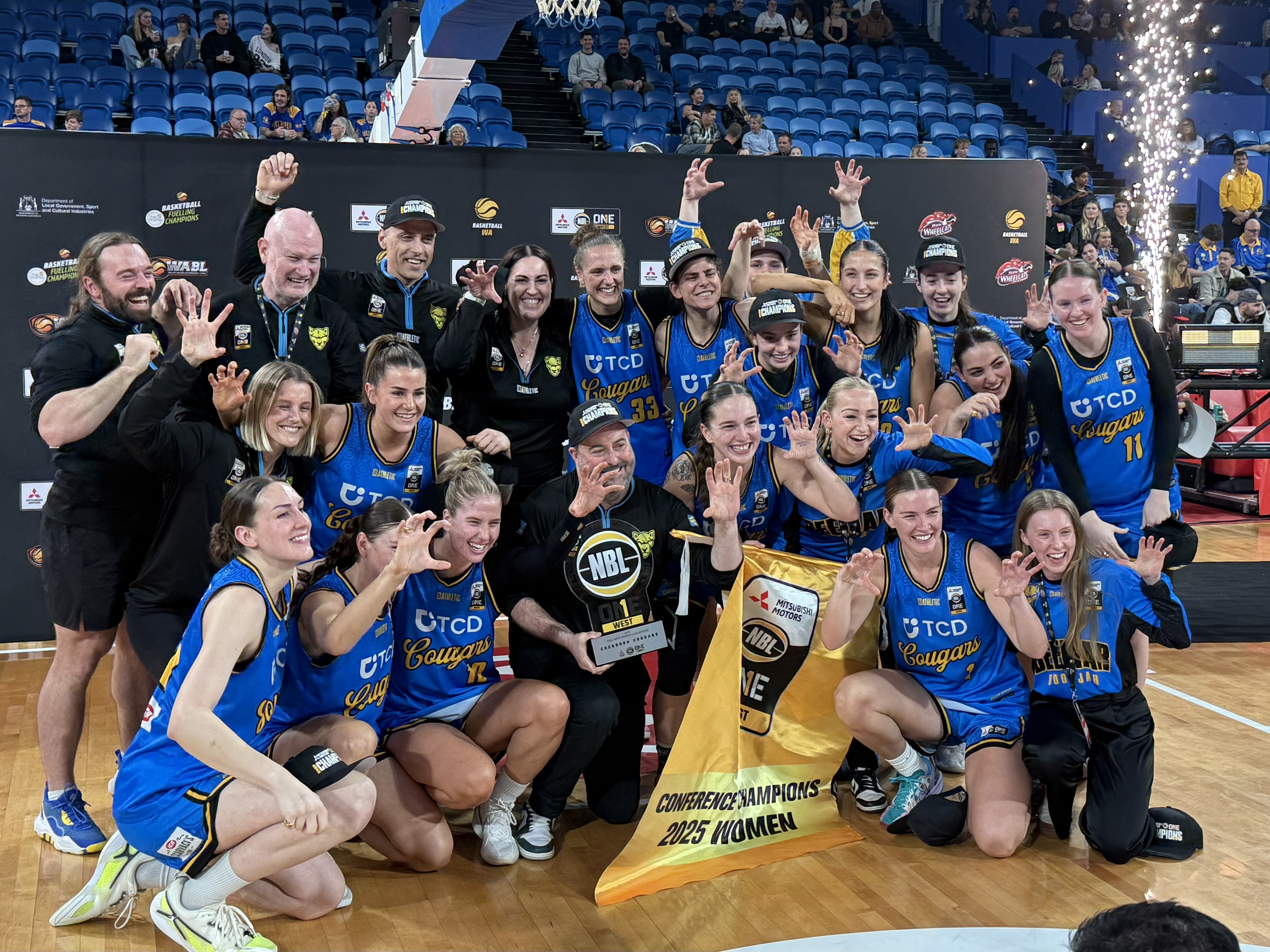
Cockburn Cougars 2025 Women's NBL1 West champions

== Awards ==
=== Player of the Week ===
Round	Men's Player	Team	Women's Player	Team	Ref
1	Elijah Pepper	Warwick Senators	Anneli Maley	Perth Redbacks	
2	Elijah Pepper	Warwick Senators	Sarah Mortensen	Cockburn Cougars	
3	Elijah Pepper	Warwick Senators	Anneli Maley	Perth Redbacks	
4	Elijah Pepper	Warwick Senators	Zitina Aokuso	Willetton Tigers	
5	Isaac White	Rockingham Flames	Erin Antosh	Goldfields Giants	
6	Julian Pesava	Mandurah Magic	Daniel Raber	Cockburn Cougars	
7	Elijah Pepper	Warwick Senators	Sasha Goodlett	East Perth Eagles	
8	Johny Narkle	Geraldton Buccaneers	Karly Murphy	Kalamunda Eastern Suns	
9	Todd Withers	Warwick Senators	Anneli Maley	Perth Redbacks	
10	Matt Leary	Perry Lakes Hawks	Chloe Forster	Warwick Senators	
11	Marshall Nelson	Kalamunda Eastern Suns	Zitina Aokuso	Willetton Tigers	
12	Johny Narkle	Geraldton Buccaneers	Zitina Aokuso	Willetton Tigers	
13	Kortland Martin	Cockburn Cougars	Stacey Barr	Warwick Senators	
14	Randy Bell	Kalamunda Eastern Suns	Nici Gilday	Goldfields Giants	
15	Lachlan Bertram	Mandurah Magic	Sarah Mortensen	Cockburn Cougars	
16	Elijah Pepper	Warwick Senators	Alexandra Sharp	Rockingham Flames	
17	Taeshon Cherry	Willetton Tigers	Natalie Chou	Perth Redbacks	
18	Elijah Pepper	Warwick Senators	Marena Whittle	Rockingham Flames	

=== Coach of the Month ===
Month	Men's Coach	Team	Women's Coach	Team	Ref
Rd 1–4	Andrew Cooper	Warwick Senators	Tim Symons	East Perth Eagles	
Rd 5–9	Ryan Petrik	Rockingham Flames	Russell Hann	Cockburn Cougars	
Rd 10–14	Dayle Joseph	Geraldton Buccaneers	Russell Hann	Cockburn Cougars	
Rd 15–18	N/A		N/A		

=== Statistics leaders ===
Stats as of the end of the regular season

Category	Men's Player	Team	Stat	Women's Player	Team	Stat
Points per game	Elijah Pepper	Warwick Senators	36.50	Karly Murphy	Kalamunda Eastern Suns	25.33
Rebounds per game	Josh Davey	Lakeside Lightning	13.65	Anneli Maley	Perth Redbacks	18.38
Assists per game	Emmett Naar	Rockingham Flames	8.19	Zitina Aokuso	Willetton Tigers	7.80
Steals per game	Pharell Keats	South West Slammers	2.24	Mykea Gray	South West Slammers	3.95
Blocks per game	A. J. Wilson	Lakeside Lightning	2.29	Jessie Edwards	Cockburn Cougars	1.58
Field goal percentage	LaQuinton Ross	Rockingham Flames	68.13%	Alex Fowler	Perry Lakes Hawks	68.75%
3-pt field goal percentage	Todd Withers	Warwick Senators	45.45%	Stephanie Gorman	Cockburn Cougars	47.28%
Free throw percentage	Elijah Pepper	Warwick Senators	88.59%	Nici Gilday	Goldfields Giants	89.85%

=== Regular season ===
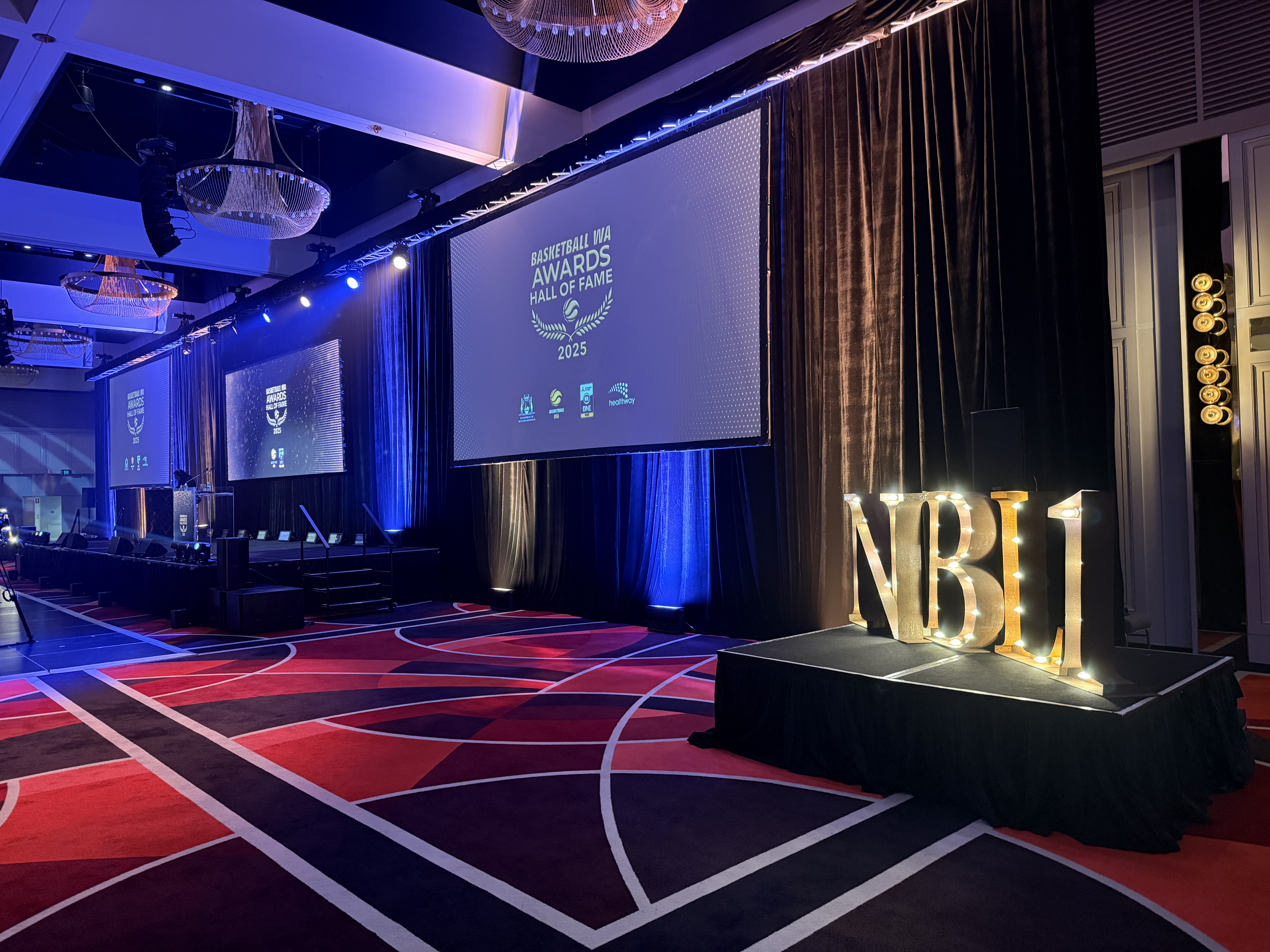
2025 Basketball WA Annual Awards Night

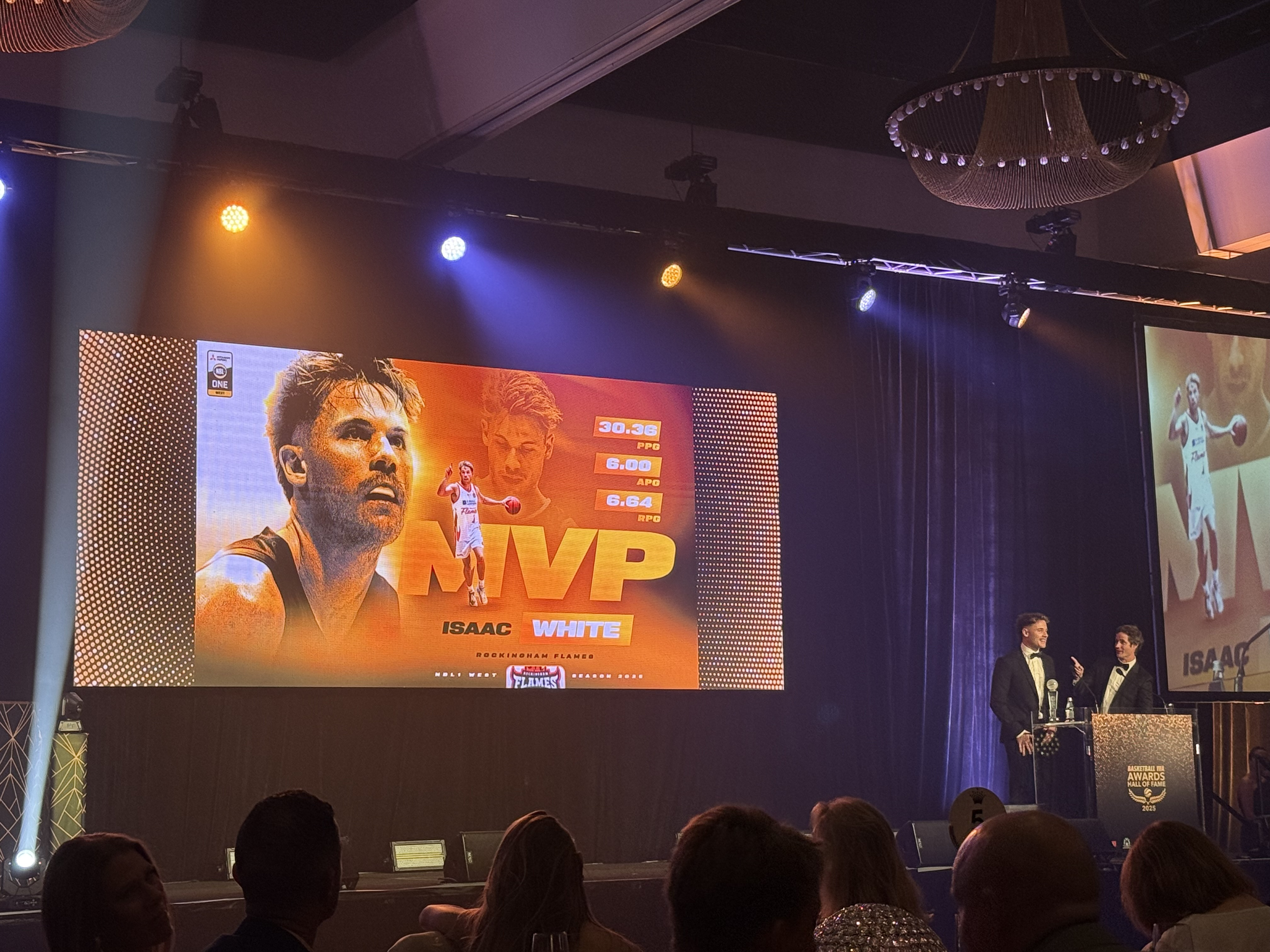
Isaac White of the Rockingham Flames being awarded men's MVP

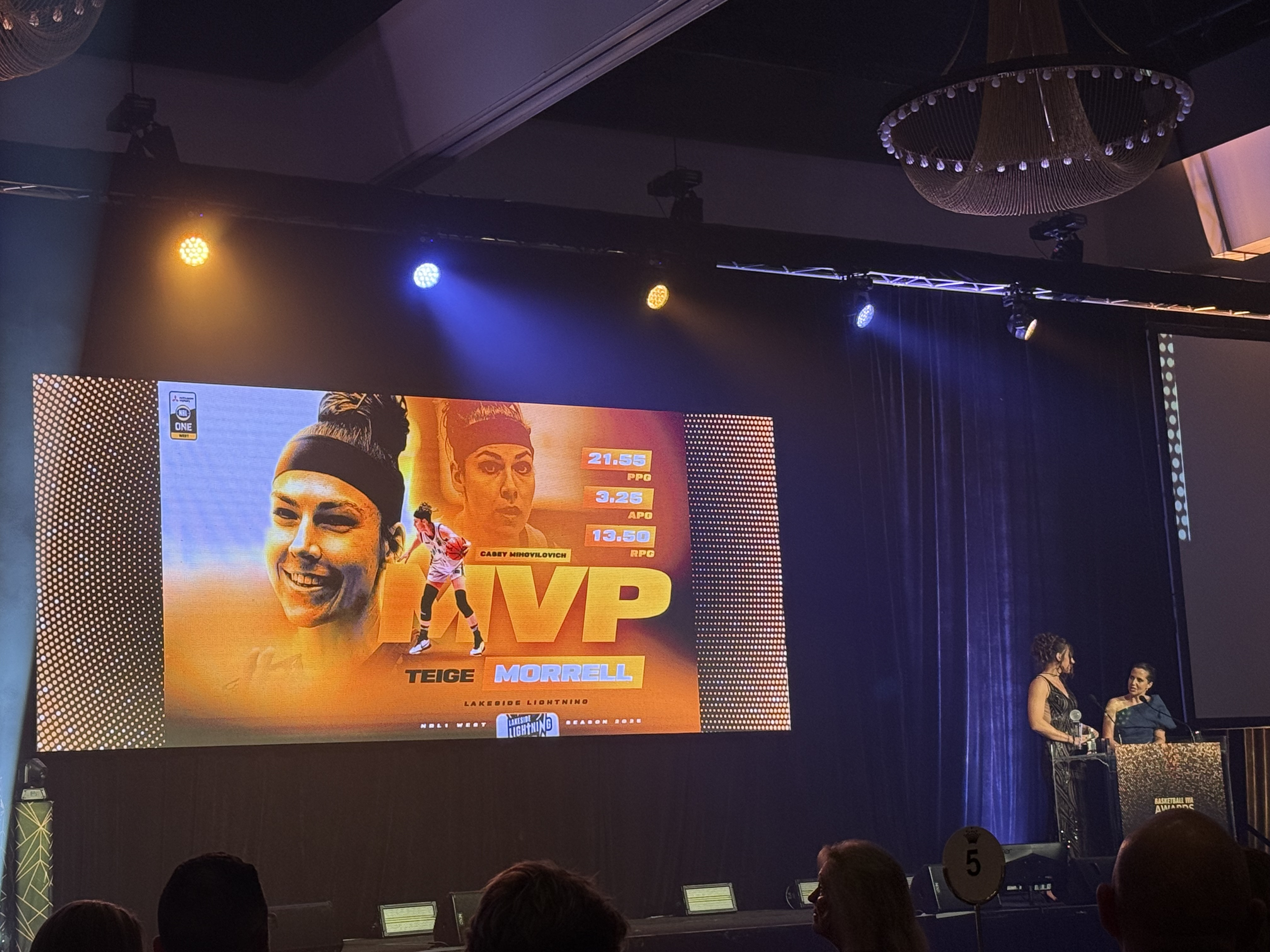
Teige Morrell of the Lakeside Lightning being awarded women's MVP

The 2025 Basketball WA Annual Awards Night was held on Saturday 2 August at Crown Perth.

- Men's Most Valuable Player: Isaac White (Rockingham Flames)
- Women's Most Valuable Player: Teige Morrell (Lakeside Lightning)
- Men's Coach of the Year: Ryan Petrik (Rockingham Flames)
- Women's Coach of the Year: Russell Hann (Cockburn Cougars)
- Men's Defensive Player of the Year: Todd Withers (Warwick Senators)
- Women's Defensive Player of the Year: Stephanie Gorman (Cockburn Cougars)
- Men's Youth Player of the Year: Johny Narkle (Geraldton Buccaneers)
- Women's Youth Player of the Year: Alaska Rhebok (Perth Redbacks)
- Sixth Man of the Year: Verle Williams (Geraldton Buccaneers)
- Sixth Woman of the Year: Kyana Weir (Warwick Senators)
- Men's Leading Scorer: Elijah Pepper (Warwick Senators)
- Women's Leading Scorer: Karly Murphy (Kalamunda Eastern Suns)
- Men's Leading Rebounder: Josh Davey (Lakeside Lightning)
- Women's Leading Rebounder: Anneli Maley (Perth Redbacks)
- Men's Golden Hands: (Note: Golden Hands Award winner is determined by the following equation: (Total Assists + Total Steals – Total Turnovers) / Games Played = Golden Hands Award Rating.) Emmett Naar (Rockingham Flames)
- Women's Golden Hands: Stefanie Berberabe (Joondalup Wolves)
- All-NBL1 West Men's 1st Team:
  - Johny Narkle (Geraldton Buccaneers)
  - De'Sean Parsons (Goldfields Giants)
  - Elijah Pepper (Warwick Senators)
  - C. J. Turnage (Joondalup Wolves)
  - Isaac White (Rockingham Flames)
- All-NBL1 West Men's 2nd Team:
  - Taeshon Cherry (Willetton Tigers)
  - Joshua Duach (Goldfields Giants)
  - Emmett Naar (Rockingham Flames)
  - Julian Pesava (Mandurah Magic)
  - Jamal Poplar (South West Slammers)
- All-NBL1 West Women's 1st Team:
  - Zitina Aokuso (Willetton Tigers)
  - Chloe Forster (Warwick Senators)
  - Anneli Maley (Perth Redbacks)
  - Teige Morrell (Lakeside Lightning)
  - Sarah Mortensen (Cockburn Cougars)
- All-NBL1 West Women's 2nd Team:
  - Abby Cubillo (East Perth Eagles)
  - Alex Fowler (Perry Lakes Hawks)
  - Nici Gilday (Goldfields Giants)
  - Stephanie Gorman (Cockburn Cougars)
  - Karly Murphy (Kalamunda Eastern Suns)
- Men's All-Defensive Team:
  - Jahcoree Ealy (Mandurah Magic)
  - Roosevelt Williams Jr (Willetton Tigers)
  - Verle Williams (Geraldton Buccaneers)
  - AJ Wilson (Lakeside Lightning)
  - Todd Withers (Warwick Senators)
- Women's All-Defensive Team:
  - Georgia Denehey (Perth Redbacks)
  - Alex Fowler (Perry Lakes Hawks)
  - Emma Gandini (Warwick Senators)
  - Stephanie Gorman (Cockburn Cougars)
  - Alexandra Sharp (Rockingham Flames)

=== Finals ===
- Men's Grand Final MVP: Johny Narkle (Geraldton Buccaneers)
- Women's Grand Final MVP: Ruby Porter (Cockburn Cougars)

== See also ==
- 2025 NBL1 season
