= Todd Withers =

American basketball player (born 1996)

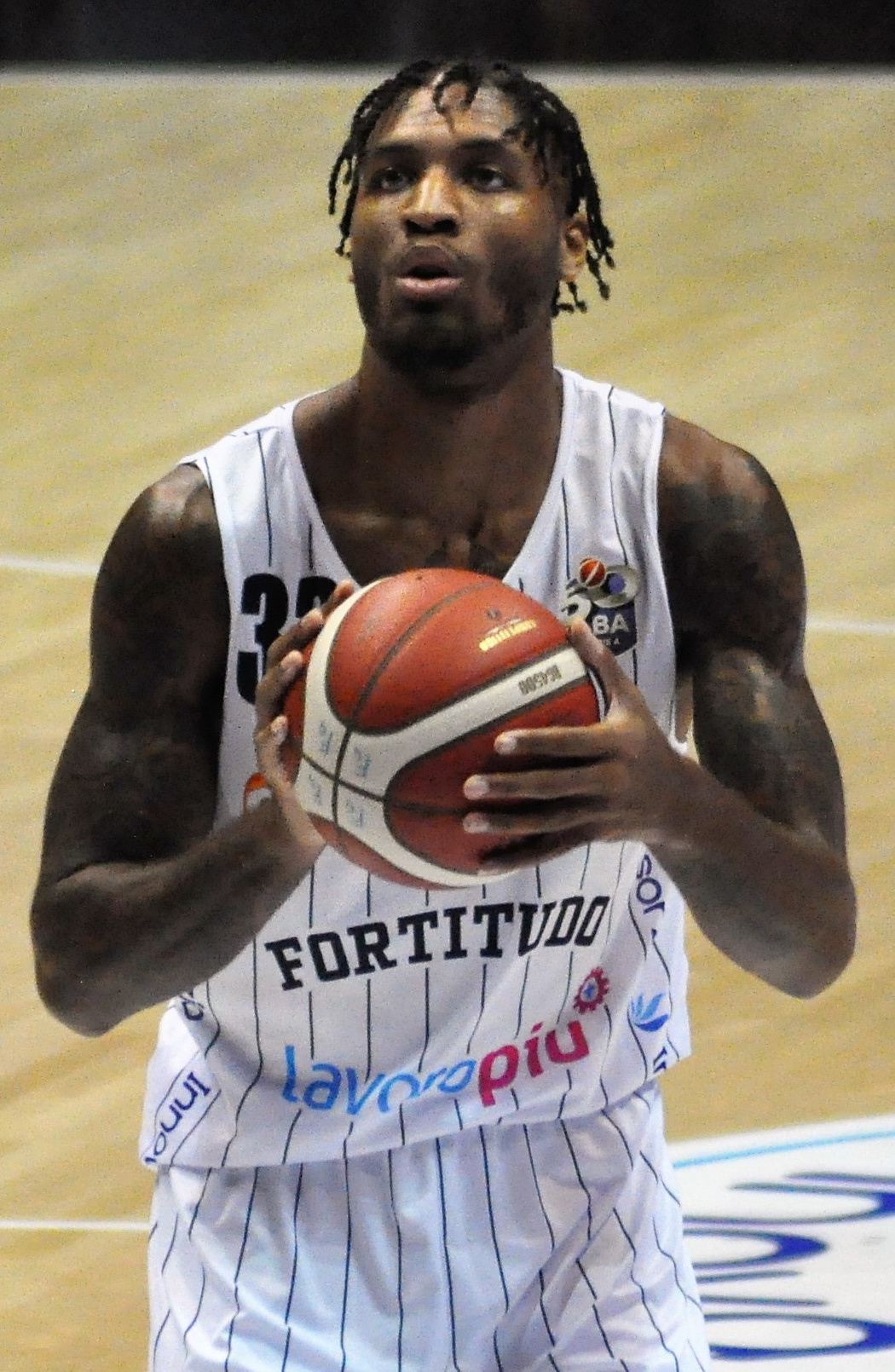
- Withers with Fortitudo Bologna in 2020

No. 33 – Rostock Seawolves
- Position: Small forward / power forward
- League: Basketball Bundesliga; EuroCup

Personal information
- Born: May 6, 1996 (age 30) Greensboro, North Carolina, U.S.
- Listed height: 6 ft 7 in (2.01 m)
- Listed weight: 216 lb (98 kg)

Career information
- High school: Northeast Guilford (McLeansville, North Carolina)
- College: Queens (2014–2018)
- NBA draft: 2018: undrafted
- Playing career: 2018–present

Career history
- 2018–2020: Grand Rapids Drive
- 2020–2021: Fortitudo Bologna
- 2021–2022: Adelaide 36ers
- 2022–2023: Otago Nuggets
- 2022–2023: Texas Legends
- 2023: Darüşşafaka
- 2024–2025: Warwick Senators
- 2024–2025: Perth Wildcats
- 2025: Otago Nuggets
- 2025–2026: Hapoel Holon
- 2026: Canterbury Rams
- 2026–present: Rostock Seawolves

Career highlights
- NZNBL champion (2022); NBL1 West Defensive Player of the Year (2025); All-NBL1 West Second Team (2024); 2× NBL1 West All-Defensive Team (2024, 2025); NZNBL All-Star Five (2023); Division II All-American – NABC (2018); First-team All-SAC (2018); Second-team All-SAC (2017)
- Stats at Basketball Reference

Todd Dwoyne Withers (born May 6, 1996) is an American professional basketball player for Rostock Seawolves of the Basketball Bundesliga (BBL) and the EuroCup. He played college basketball for the Queens Royals.

== Early life ==
Withers was born in Greensboro, North Carolina. He was raised in Greensboro by his single mother Kattodda, never meeting his biological father. She brought up him and his three siblings.

Withers attended Northeast Guilford High School in McLeansville, North Carolina, where he was a member of the basketball, football, tennis and track and field teams. He was named All-Mid State Conference as a junior and senior, when he was also named the conference most valuable player.

== College career ==
Withers played four seasons of college basketball for the Queens Royals. He played in 14 games as a freshman in 2014–15. That increased to 32 games in 2015–16, where he averaged 10.4 points and 6.1 rebounds per game.

As a junior in 2016–17, Withers played in 34 games and 32 of them, averaging 13.6 points, 7.0 rebounds and 1.1 blocks per game. He was subsequently named second-team South Atlantic Conference (SAC).

As a senior in 2017–18, Withers was named an All-American by the National Association of Basketball Coaches (NABC), becoming the first Royal to receive the honor since 2004. He led the team in scoring, rebounding, and blocked shots, averaging 13.6 points, 8.0 rebounds and 1.7 blocks per game. He was also named first-team All-SAC, second-team All-Region (D2CCCA) and an All-State selection (NCCSIA). The team went 32–4, compiling the program's best record, and won the Southeast Regional title to advance to the Elite Eight of the 2018 NCAA Division II men's basketball tournament for the first time since 2003. In the national quarterfinals, Withers had 26 points, seven rebounds and five assists to help Queens make its second all-time appearance in the national semifinals, tying for the deepest postseason run in program history.

In his four years with the Royals, Withers had 1,356 points (seventh all-time) and 766 rebounds (third all-time). In 113 career appearances (third all-time) and 95 starts, Withers compiled 15 double-doubles and twice recorded a career high of 29 points in a game.

== Professional career ==
=== Grand Rapids Drive (2018–2020) ===
On October 11, 2018, Withers signed with the Grand Rapids Drive of the NBA G League. He started 37 games for the Drive in the 2018–19 season, averaging 6.9 points, 5.6 rebounds, 1.1 assists, 1.0 steals, and 0.8 blocks in 25.8 minutes per game.

Withers played for the Detroit Pistons in the 2019 NBA Summer League and then signed a contract with the Pistons on July 23. He was waived by the Pistons October 17, 2019. He subsequently returned to Grand Rapids for the 2019–20 season and averaged 10.7 points, 5.0 rebounds and 1.0 assists in 42 games.

=== Fortitudo Bologna (2020–2021) ===
On July 2, 2020, Withers signed with Fortitudo Bologna of Italian Lega Basket Serie A (LBA).

=== Adelaide 36ers (2021–2022) ===
On August 5, 2021, Withers signed with the Adelaide 36ers for the 2021–22 NBL season. He averaged 8.3 points and 3.8 rebounds per game.

=== Otago Nuggets and Texas Legends (2022–2023) ===
On April 22, 2022, Withers signed with the Otago Nuggets for the 2022 New Zealand NBL season. He helped the Nuggets win the championship with an 81–73 win over the Auckland Tuatara in the grand final.

After initially signing in Lithuania with Rytas Vilnius, Withers joined the Texas Legends of the NBA G League on December 26, 2022.

On March 8, 2023, Withers re-signed with the Nuggets for the 2023 New Zealand NBL season. He was named to the NZNBL All-Star Five.

=== Darüşşafaka (2023) ===
On July 22, 2023, Withers signed with Darüşşafaka of the Basketbol Süper Ligi (BSL). He left the team in mid December.

=== Warwick Senators, Perth Wildcats and Otago Nuggets (2024–2025) ===
In February 2024, Withers signed with the Warwick Senators of the NBL1 West for the 2024 season. He was named to the All-NBL1 West Second Team and NBL1 West All-Defensive Team.

Following the NBL1 West season, Withers began training with the Perth Wildcats during the pre-season. On August 30, 2024, he signed with the Wildcats on a nominated replacement player (NRP) contract for the 2024–25 NBL season. He covered for all three imports – Bryce Cotton, Kristian Doolittle and Dylan Windler – during the season. In 14 games, he averaged 5.8 points and 2.6 rebounds per game.

On March 18, 2025, Withers signed a short-term contract with the Otago Nuggets for the start of the 2025 New Zealand NBL season. He then re-joined the Senators for the 2025 NBL1 West season. On May 31, he scored 34 points and made 11 3-pointers in the Senators' 114–113 win over the Goldfields Giants. He was named NBL1 West Defensive Player of the Year and earned NBL1 West All-Defensive Team honors for the second straight year. He helped the team reach the NBL1 West Grand Final, where they lost 81–78 to the Geraldton Buccaneers with Withers scoring 12 points.

=== Hapoel Holon (2025–2026) ===
In September 2025, Withers joined Hapoel Holon of the Israeli Basketball Premier League. He appeared in 12 Premier League games and seven BCL games, with his final game coming on January 20, 2026.

=== Canterbury Rams (2026) ===
On April 1, 2026, Withers signed with the Canterbury Rams for the 2026 New Zealand NBL season.

=== Rostock Seawolves (2026–present) ===
On July 24, 2026, Withers signed with Rostock Seawolves of the Basketball Bundesliga.
