= 2026 NBL1 West season =

- League: NBL1 West
- Sport: Basketball
- Duration: 26 March – 25 July (Regular season); 31 July – 15 August (Finals)
- Games: 22 (men); 20 (women)
- Teams: 14 (men); 13 (women)

Regular season
- Minor premiers: M: Geraldton Buccaneers; W: Cockburn Cougars
- Season MVP: M: Isaac White (Rockingham Flames); W: Jessie Edwards (Cockburn Cougars)
- Top scorer: M: Jack Browder (Perry Lakes Hawks); W: Makenna Marisa (Perry Lakes Hawks)

Finals
- Champions: M: Rockingham Flames; W: Warwick Senators
- Runners-up: M: Geraldton Buccaneers; W: Cockburn Cougars
- Grand Final MVP: M: Isaac White (Rockingham Flames); W: Chloe Forster (Warwick Senators)

NBL1 West seasons
- ← 2025 2027 →

The 2026 NBL1 West season was the sixth season of the NBL1 West and 37th overall in State Basketball League (SBL) / NBL1 West history. The regular season began on Thursday 26 March and ended on Saturday 25 July. The finals began on Friday 31 July and concluded with both the women's grand final and the men's grand final on Saturday 15 August.

The 2026 NBL1 season concluded with the fifth annual NBL1 National Finals held at the State Basketball Centre in Adelaide.

== Regular season ==
The regular season began on Thursday 26 March and ended on Saturday 25 July after 18 rounds of competition. The season featured Easter Round (2), Anzac Round (5), Heritage Round (10), and First Nations Round (15–16).

A round one game between the Geraldton Buccaneers and Warwick Senators was postponed due to the anticipated impact of ex-tropical Cyclone Narelle on Geraldton, with the Buccaneers' home venue designated as a potential emergency evacuation centre.

A round 10 game between the Geraldton Buccaneers and Goldfields Giants was abandoned at half-time due to unsafe court conditions caused by high humidity. The league subsequently declared the fixture a washout, with the game recorded as a "No Game" and neither team receiving a win or loss. Final ladder positions will be determined by win percentage.

Due to remediation works at Bendat Basketball Centre, the round 11 match-up between the Perry Lakes Hawks and Rockingham Flames was postponed. The match-up was later moved to round 16.

A second round 11 game between the Geraldton Buccaneers and Willetton Tigers was rescheduled to round 15.

=== Standings ===
Men's ladder

Pos	Team	Pld	W	L	PCT	Qualification
1	Geraldton Buccaneers	21	18	3	.857	Finals
2	Rockingham Flames	22	18	4	.818	Finals
3	Joondalup Wolves	22	16	6	.727	Finals
4	Cockburn Cougars	22	15	7	.682	Finals
5	Willetton Tigers	22	13	9	.591	Finals
6	Kalamunda Eastern Suns	22	13	9	.591	Finals
7	Perry Lakes Hawks	22	12	10	.545	Finals
8	East Perth Eagles	22	10	12	.455	Finals
9	Lakeside Lightning	22	9	13	.409	
10	Perth Redbacks	22	8	14	.364	
11	Mandurah Magic	22	7	15	.318	
12	Goldfields Giants	21	6	15	.286	
13	Warwick Senators	22	6	16	.273	
14	South West Slammers	22	2	20	.091	

Source: NBL1
Due to a washout between Geraldton Buccaneers and Goldfields Giants, both teams played one less game than the other 12 men's teams. The ladder was subsequently ranked on win percentage.

Women's ladder

Pos	Team	Pld	W	L	Pts	Qualification
1	Cockburn Cougars	20	17	3	34	Finals
2	Rockingham Flames	20	16	4	32	Finals
3	East Perth Eagles	20	15	5	30	Finals
4	Warwick Senators	20	14	6	28	Finals
5	Mandurah Magic	20	13	7	26	Finals
6	Goldfields Giants	20	9	11	18	Finals
7	Lakeside Lightning	20	9	11	18	Finals
8	Joondalup Wolves	20	9	11	18	Finals
9	Kalamunda Eastern Suns	20	8	12	16	
10	Perth Redbacks	20	7	13	14	
11	Perry Lakes Hawks	20	6	14	12	
12	Willetton Tigers	20	4	16	8	
13	South West Slammers	20	3	17	6	

Source: NBL1

== Finals ==
The finals began on Friday 31 July and consisted of four rounds. The finals concluded with the women's grand final and the men's grand final on Saturday 15 August. Both grand finals were played at RAC Arena in front of 5,211 people.

=== Men's bracket ===
Qualifying and elimination finals
Aug 1, Activewest Stadium
1	Geraldton Buccaneers	95
4	Cockburn Cougars	110
Aug 1, Willetton Basketball Stadium
5	Willetton Tigers	96
8	East Perth Eagles	83
Aug 1, Ray Owen Sports Centre
6	Kalamunda Eastern Suns	57
7	Perry Lakes Hawks	87
Aug 1, Mike Barnett Sports Complex
2	Rockingham Flames	97
3	Joondalup Wolves	99

Semi-finals
Aug 7, Activewest Stadium
Geraldton Buccaneers	78
Willetton Tigers	74
Aug 6, Mike Barnett Sports Complex
Rockingham Flames	88
Perry Lakes Hawks	75

Preliminary finals
Aug 8, Wally Hagan Stadium
Cockburn Cougars	102
Rockingham Flames	116
Aug 9, Arena Joondalup
Joondalup Wolves	76
Geraldton Buccaneers	88

Grand final
Aug 15, RAC Arena
Rockingham Flames	66
Geraldton Buccaneers	62

==== Grand Final summary ====
Kayo Sports

15 August 2026
7:10 pm

Box score
Report

Rockingham Flames 66, Geraldton Buccaneers 62
Scoring by quarter: 13–10, 16–14, 24–25, 13–13
Pts: Isaac White 19; Rebs: Blake Jones 11; Asts: Emmett Naar 8	Pts: Devondrick Walker 16; Rebs: Joshua Keyes 12; Asts: Devondrick Walker 9
Rockingham wins NBL1 West Championship

RAC Arena, Perth
MVP: Isaac White (Flames)

NBL1 West Men's Grand Final

Rockingham Flames 2026 Men's NBL1 West champions

=== Women's bracket ===
Qualifying and elimination finals
Jul 31, Wally Hagan Stadium
1	Cockburn Cougars	91
4	Warwick Senators	79
Jul 31, Mandurah ARC
5	Mandurah Magic	81
8	Joondalup Wolves	90
Aug 1, Goldfields Basketball Stadium
6	Goldfields Giants	93
7	Lakeside Lightning	78
Aug 1, Mike Barnett Sports Complex
2	Rockingham Flames	86
3	East Perth Eagles	84

Semi-finals
Aug 6, Warwick Stadium
Warwick Senators	91
Joondalup Wolves	70
Aug 7, Morley Sport and Recreation Centre
East Perth Eagles	84
Goldfields Giants	77

Preliminary finals
Aug 9, Wally Hagan Stadium
Cockburn Cougars	120
East Perth Eagles	86
Aug 8, Mike Barnett Sports Complex
Rockingham Flames	86
Warwick Senators	90

Grand final
Aug 15, RAC Arena
Cockburn Cougars	76
Warwick Senators	102

==== Grand Final summary ====
Kayo Sports

15 August 2026
4:30 pm

Box score
Report

Cockburn Cougars 76, Warwick Senators 102
Scoring by quarter: 25–26, 19–28, 15–26, 17–22
Pts: Edwards, Garbin 18 each Rebs: Edwards, Garbin 5 each Asts: Daniel Raber 5	Pts: Chloe Forster 34; Rebs: Jayda Clark 7 Asts: Jayda Clark 9
Warwick wins NBL1 West Championship

RAC Arena, Perth
MVP: Chloe Forster (Senators)

NBL1 West Women's Grand Final

Warwick Senators 2026 Women's NBL1 West champions

== Awards ==
=== Player of the Week ===
Round	Men's Player	Team	Women's Player	Team	Ref
1	George Pearl	Warwick Senators	Sierra Moore	Goldfields Giants	
2	David Okwera	East Perth Eagles	Sami Whitcomb	Rockingham Flames	
3	Taeshon Cherry	Willetton Tigers	Anneli Maley	Perth Redbacks	
4	Cameron Huefner	Perry Lakes Hawks	Bridgette Rettstatt	Perry Lakes Hawks	
5	Isaac White	Rockingham Flames	Mikayla Pivec	Mandurah Magic	
6	Terrandus Smith	Kalamunda Eastern Suns	Sierra Moore	Goldfields Giants	
7	Michael Harris	Rockingham Flames	Chloe Forster	Warwick Senators	
8	Marley Sam	Kalamunda Eastern Suns	Teige Morrell	Rockingham Flames	
9	Devondrick Walker	Geraldton Buccaneers	Mikayla Pivec	Mandurah Magic	
10	Sharif Black	Joondalup Wolves	Stacey Barr	East Perth Eagles	
11	Johny Narkle	Cockburn Cougars	Patricia Brossmann	Perth Redbacks	
12	Cam Huefner	Perry Lakes Hawks	Sam Ashby	Perth Redbacks	
13	Sharif Black	Joondalup Wolves	Makenna Marisa	Perry Lakes Hawks	
14	Joseph Bradshaw	Cockburn Cougars	Kim Pierre-Louis	Joondalup Wolves	
15	Sean Conway	Perth Redbacks	Alyssa Bowen	Kalamunda Eastern Suns	
16	Jack Browder	Perry Lakes Hawks	Delaynie Byrne	Goldfields Giants	
17	Marshawn Blackmon	Warwick Senators	Jessie Edwards	Cockburn Cougars	
18	Matthew Norman	Geraldton Buccaneers	Trista Hull	Kalamunda Eastern Suns	

=== Coach of the Month ===
Month	Men's Coach	Team	Women's Coach	Team	Ref
March/April	Adam Nener	Willetton Tigers	Russell Hann	Cockburn Cougars	
May	Ryan Petrik	Rockingham Flames	David Morrell	Rockingham Flames	
June	N/A		N/A		
July	N/A		N/A		

=== Statistics leaders ===
Stats as of the end of the regular season

Category	Men's Player	Team	Stat	Women's Player	Team	Stat
Points per game	Jack Browder	Perry Lakes Hawks	30.72	Makenna Marisa	Perry Lakes Hawks	26.42
Rebounds per game	Josh Davey	Lakeside Lightning	13.10	Trista Hull	Kalamunda Eastern Suns	15.00
Assists per game	Emmett Naar	Rockingham Flames	9.05	Mikayla Pivec	Mandurah Magic	8.38
Steals per game	Marley Sam	Kalamunda Eastern Suns	3.32	Emma Gandini	Willetton Tigers	3.59
Blocks per game	David Okwera	East Perth Eagles	1.57	Trista Hull	Kalamunda Eastern Suns	2.38
Field goal percentage	Maxwell Bucknell	Perry Lakes Hawks	65.35%	Jessie Edwards	Cockburn Cougars	70.76%
3-pt field goal percentage	Rowan Mackenzie	Cockburn Cougars	50.44%	Sara Puckett	Rockingham Flames	47.22%
Free throw percentage	Sean Conway	Perth Redbacks	89.71%	Sydney Wright	East Perth Eagles	88.51%

=== Regular season ===
2026 Basketball WA Annual Awards Night

The 2026 Basketball WA Annual Awards Night was held on Saturday 25 July at Crown Perth.

- Men's Most Valuable Player: Isaac White (Rockingham Flames)
- Women's Most Valuable Player: Jessie Edwards (Cockburn Cougars)
- Men's Coach of the Year: Dayle Joseph (Geraldton Buccaneers)
- Women's Coach of the Year: Jonelle Morley (East Perth Eagles)
- Men's Defensive Player of the Year: Joshua Keyes (Geraldton Buccaneers)
- Women's Defensive Player of the Year: Jessie Edwards (Cockburn Cougars)
- Men's Youth Player of the Year: Marley Sam (Kalamunda Eastern Suns)
- Women's Youth Player of the Year: Jayda Clark (Warwick Senators)
- Sixth Man of the Year: Ryan Godfrey (Rockingham Flames)
- Sixth Woman of the Year: Darcee Garbin (Cockburn Cougars)
- Men's Leading Scorer: Jack Browder (Perry Lakes Hawks)
- Women's Leading Scorer: Makenna Marisa (Perry Lakes Hawks)
- Men's Leading Rebounder: Josh Davey (Lakeside Lightning)
- Women's Leading Rebounder: Trista Hull (Kalamunda Eastern Suns)
- Men's Golden Hands: (Note: Golden Hands Award winner is determined by the following equation: (Total Assists + Total Steals – Total Turnovers) / Games Played = Golden Hands Award Rating.) Emmett Naar (Rockingham Flames)
- Women's Golden Hands: Mikayla Pivec (Mandurah Magic)
- All-NBL1 West Men's 1st Team:
  - Sharif Black (Joondalup Wolves)
  - Jack Browder (Perry Lakes Hawks)
  - Cameron Huefner (Perry Lakes Hawks)
  - Liam Hunt (Geraldton Buccaneers)
  - Isaac White (Rockingham Flames)
- All-NBL1 West Men's 2nd Team:
  - Taeshon Cherry (Willetton Tigers)
  - Joshua Keyes (Geraldton Buccaneers)
  - Rowan Mackenzie (Cockburn Cougars)
  - Johny Narkle (Cockburn Cougars)
  - Marley Sam (Kalamunda Eastern Suns)
- All-NBL1 West Women's 1st Team:
  - Jessie Edwards (Cockburn Cougars)
  - Makenna Marisa (Perry Lakes Hawks)
  - Sierra Moore (Goldfields Giants)
  - Mikayla Pivec (Mandurah Magic)
  - Sara Puckett (Rockingham Flames)
- All-NBL1 West Women's 2nd Team:
  - Samantha Ashby (Perth Redbacks)
  - Stacey Barr (East Perth Eagles)
  - Chloe Forster (Warwick Senators)
  - Esmeralda Morales (Lakeside Lightning)
  - Sarah Mortensen (East Perth Eagles)
- Men's All-Defensive Team:
  - Josh Davey (Lakeside Lightning)
  - Joshua Keyes (Geraldton Buccaneers)
  - Marley Sam (Kalamunda Eastern Suns)
  - Damien Scott (Willetton Tigers)
  - Jordan Wellsteed (Joondalup Wolves)
- Women's All-Defensive Team:
  - Sophie Doran (Perth Redbacks)
  - Jessie Edwards (Cockburn Cougars)
  - Chloe Forster (Warwick Senators)
  - Emma Gandini (Willetton Tigers)
  - Sierra Moore (Goldfields Giants)

=== Finals ===
- Men's Grand Final MVP: Isaac White (Rockingham Flames)
- Women's Grand Final MVP: Chloe Forster (Warwick Senators)

== See also ==
- 2026 NBL1 season
