= Johny Narkle =

Australian basketball player

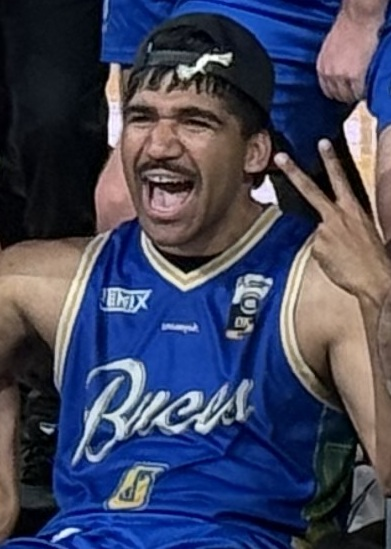
- Narkle with the Geraldton Buccaneers in 2025

No. 16 – Illawarra Hawks
- Position: Guard
- League: NBL

Personal information
- Born: 1 August 2001 (age 25)
- Listed height: 199 cm (6 ft 6 in)
- Listed weight: 79 kg (174 lb)

Career information
- Playing career: 2020–present

Career history
- 2020; 2022–2025: Geraldton Buccaneers
- 2025–present: Illawarra Hawks
- 2026: Cockburn Cougars

Career highlights
- 2× NBL1 West champion (2023, 2025); 2× NBL1 West Grand Final MVP (2023, 2025); All-NBL1 West First Team (2025); All-NBL1 West Second Team (2026); 2× NBL1 National Finals All-Star Five (2023, 2025); NBL1 West Youth Player of the Year (2025); 2× NBL1 West Sixth Man of the Year (2022, 2023); NBL1 West All-Defensive Team (2024)

Johny Narkle (born 1 August 2001) is an Australian professional basketball player for the Illawarra Hawks of the National Basketball League (NBL).

Narkle played for the Geraldton Buccaneers between 2020 and 2025. He won back-to-back NBL1 West Sixth Man of the Year awards in 2022 and 2023 and led the Buccaneers to the NBL1 West championship in 2023 behind his grand final MVP performance. In 2025, he won his second championship with the Buccaneers behind another grand final MVP performance, while also earning NBL1 West Youth Player of the Year and All-NBL1 West First Team honours.

In the 2025–26 season, Narkle debuted in the NBL for the Illawarra Hawks.

== Early life ==
Narkle grew up in Geraldton, Western Australia, with four brothers and five sisters. He attended Clontarf Academy and juggled being a two-sport athlete, playing both basketball and football as a teenager.

In 2018, Narkle played for the Australian Indigenous All Stars in a Trans-Tasman series against the New Zealand Maori national team. In 2019, he played at the inaugural Australian Indigenous Basketball (AIB) National Tournament in Cairns.

== Career ==
=== Geraldton Buccaneers (2020; 2022–2025) ===
In 2020, Narkle joined the Geraldton Buccaneers of the State Basketball League (SBL). After the SBL season was cancelled due to the COVID-19 pandemic, Narkle debuted for the Buccaneers in the West Coast Classic. With the team having lost their imports and also key local players, Narkle was required to fill a starting role in his first season which fast tracked his development. He finished the season with four-straight double digit games. In 12 games, he averaged 9.17 points, 5.17 rebounds and 2.83 assists per game.

Narkle impressed with Chapman Valley in the Great Northern Football League (GNFL) at the end of 2020. He subsequently joined the Subiaco Football Club of the West Australian Football League (WAFL) in 2021. He played seven games for Subiaco's WAFL reserves team. He switched back to basketball in 2022.

Narkle returned to the Geraldton Buccaneers for the 2022 NBL1 West season. He was named Sixth Man of the Year and helped the Buccaneers reach the NBL1 West grand final, where they lost 91–79 to the Rockingham Flames. In 24 games, he averaged 8.0 points, 3.67 rebounds and 1.17 steals per game.

With the Buccaneers in the 2023 NBL1 West season, Narkle earned Sixth Man of the Year honours for the second straight year. Towards the end of the regular season, he was moved into the starting line-up. He helped the Buccaneers return to the NBL1 West grand final, where they defeated the Joondalup Wolves 86–80 to win the championship. Narkle had 21 points, 11 rebounds, three assists and four steals to earn grand final MVP honours. He became the first Indigenous man to win the award. In 25 games, he averaged 12.12 points, 5.64 rebounds, 2.32 assists and 1.76 steals per game. At the NBL1 National Finals, he scored 27 points against the Sutherland Sharks and 30 points against the Ipswich Force. He was subsequently named in the National Finals All-Star Five. A week later, he played for the NBL1 West Select Team against the Perth Wildcats in two National Basketball League (NBL) pre-season games. Following this, he had a two-day trial with Melbourne United of the NBL.

In October 2023, Narkle re-signed with the Buccaneers for the 2024 NBL1 West season. He suffered a broken bone in his arm early in the season, which ruled him out for four to six weeks. In June 2024, he was named in an Indigenous Basketball Australia All-Stars team for an exhibition match against the Sacramento State Hornets. Despite missing 10 games, he was named to the NBL1 West All-Defensive Team. He went on to help the Buccaneers reach the preliminary final, where they lost 98–89 to the Willetton Tigers despite Narkle's 40 points and 11 rebounds. In 14 games, he averaged 23.0 points, 7.36 rebounds, 3.5 assists, 1.64 steals and 1.21 blocks per game. Following the season, he once again played for the NBL1 West Select Team against the Perth Wildcats in two NBL pre-season games.

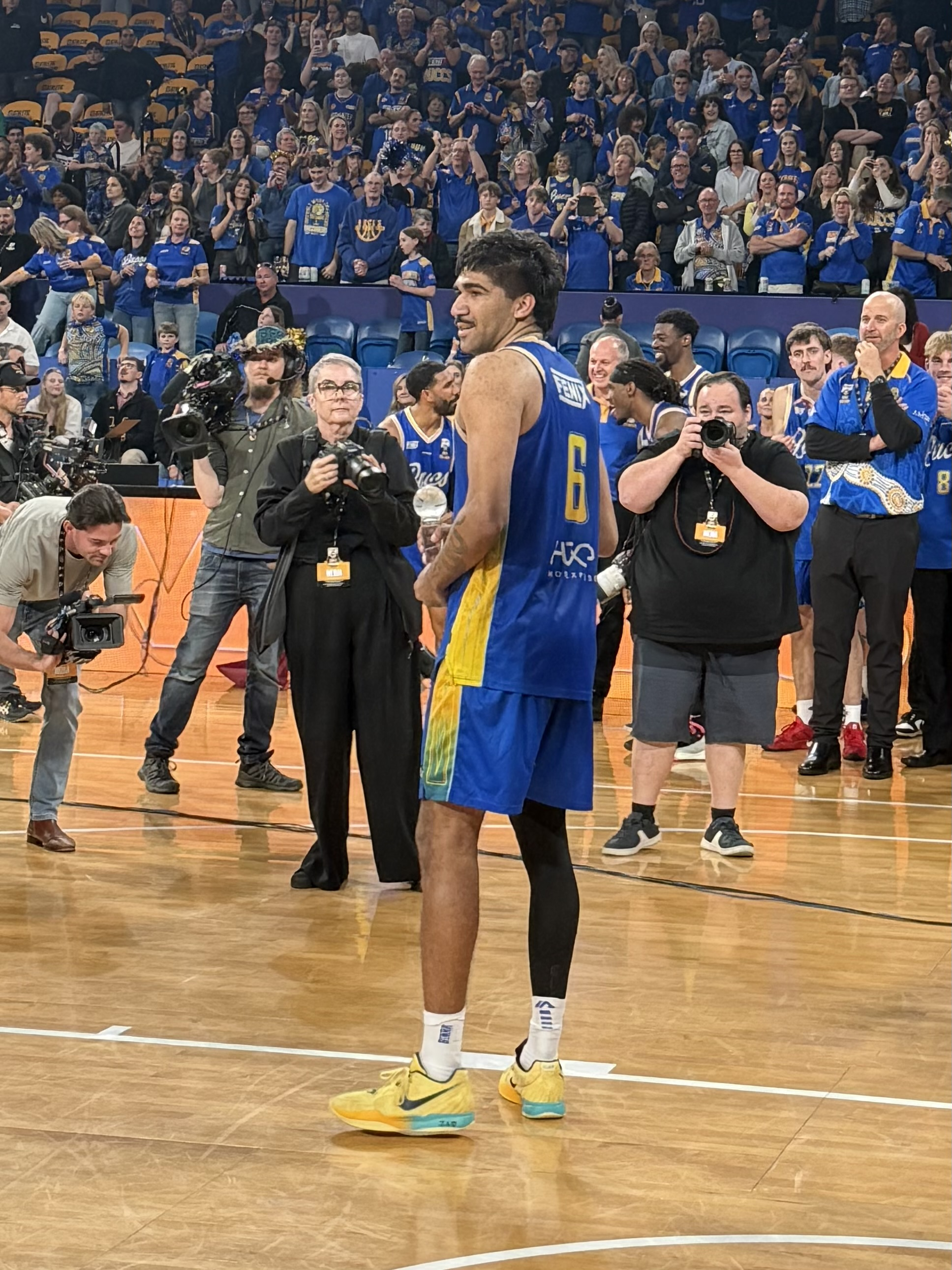
Narkle after winning the 2025 NBL1 West Grand Final MVP

In February 2025, Narkle re-signed with the Buccaneers for the 2025 NBL1 West season. On 11 June 2025, he played for the Indigenous Basketball Australia All-Stars team in an exhibition match against Maori Basketball New Zealand, where he had 10 points, four rebounds and four assists in a 104–90 win. On 21 June, he scored 53 points in the Buccaneers' 135–88 win over the Goldfields Giants. He was named NBL1 West Youth Player of the Year and earned All-NBL1 West First Team honours. He helped the Buccaneers reach the NBL1 West Grand Final with 25 points, 11 rebounds, seven assists and two steals in a 99–80 win over the Willetton Tigers in the preliminary final. In the grand final, he had 21 points, nine rebounds, four steals, three assists and three blocks in an 81–78 victory over the Warwick Senators to win his second NBL1 West championship. He was subsequently named grand final MVP for the second time. In 26 games, he averaged 23.15 points, 7.92 rebounds, 4.96 assists, 2.15 steals and 1.65 blocks per game. At the 2025 NBL1 National Finals, the Buccaneers reached the championship game, where they lost 86–67 to the Canberra Gunners despite Narkle's 12 points, nine rebounds, five assists and three steals. He was named to the NBL1 National Finals All-Star Five for the second time.

=== Illawarra Hawks and Cockburn Cougars (2025–present) ===
On 5 August 2025, Narkle signed with the Illawarra Hawks as a development player for the 2025–26 NBL season. In his NBL debut on 11 October 2025, he scored five points in a 116–89 win over the Brisbane Bullets. He was elevated to the Hawks' main roster for their game against the Perth Wildcats on 25 October, replacing Jonah Antonio. He finished the season having played 18 games, including a season finale where he played a career-high 20 minutes for six points, four rebounds, an assist, a steal and a block against the Tasmania JackJumpers.

Narkle joined the Cockburn Cougars for the 2026 NBL1 West season. On 6 June, he scored 28 of his 40 points in the fourth quarter of the Cougars' 91–82 win over the Goldfields Giants. On 20 June, he scored 47 points in a 103–84 win over the Willetton Tigers. In July 2026, he played for the Indigenous Basketball Australia All-Stars team in an exhibition match against Maori Basketball New Zealand, where he scored 19 points in a 106–88 win. He was named to the All-NBL1 West Second Team. In the Cougars' qualifying final, Narkle recorded 20 points, seven rebounds and six assist in a 110–95 win over the Buccaneers in Geraldton. In the preliminary final, the Cougars lost 116–102 to the Rockingham Flames despite 28 points from Narkle.

On 16 June 2026, Narkle re-signed with the Illawarra Hawks on a two-year deal. On 25 September 2026, he produced his best NBL performance with 15 points, four rebounds and two assists while being +12 in 22 minutes in a 103–95 loss to the Brisbane Bullets.
