= Chloe Forster =

Australian basketball player (born 2003)

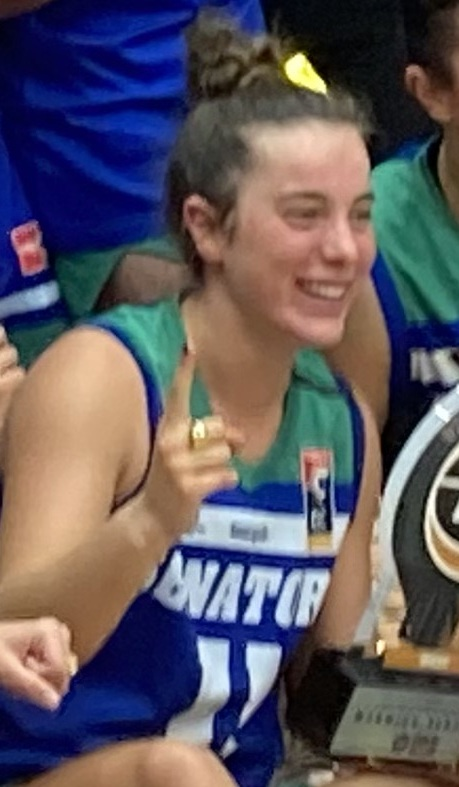
- Forster with the Warwick Senators in 2022

No. 11 – Townsville Fire
- Position: Guard
- League: WNBL

Personal information
- Born: 7 May 2003 (age 23)
- Listed height: 178 cm (5 ft 10 in)

Career information
- High school: Woodvale Secondary College (Perth, Western Australia)
- Playing career: 2019–present

Career history
- 2019–present: Warwick Senators
- 2022–2024: Perth Lynx
- 2024: Northern Kahu
- 2025–present: Townsville Fire

Career highlights
- WNBL champion (2026); NBL1 National champion (2022); 2× NBL1 West champion (2022, 2026); NBL1 West Grand Final MVP (2026); 2× All-NBL1 West First Team (2024, 2025); All-NBL1 West Second Team (2026); NBL1 West All-Defensive Team (2026); NBL1 West Golden Hands (2024); NBL1 West Youth Player of the Year (2023); TBA Youth Player of the Year (2024)

Chloe Forster (born 7 May 2003) is an Australian professional basketball player for the Townsville Fire of the Women's National Basketball League (WNBL). She is also contracted with the Warwick Senators of the NBL1 West. She debuted for the Senators in the State Basketball League (SBL) in 2019. In 2022, she helped the Senators win the NBL1 West championship and the NBL1 National championship. In 2024 and 2025, she earned back-to-back All-NBL1 West First Team honours, and in 2026, she won her second NBL1 West championship behind a grand final MVP performance.

Forster debuted in the WNBL in 2022 with the Perth Lynx. After two seasons with the Lynx, she played a season in the Tauihi Basketball Aotearoa in New Zealand with the Northern Kahu and then joined the Townsville Fire for the 2025–26 season, where she won a WNBL championship.

== Early life ==
Forster hails from Hocking in Perth, Western Australia. She attended Woodvale Secondary College in Perth and was a member of the School Sport WA state school girls basketball team in 2019, where she was a medal winner and earned All-Australian honours at the national championships held in Bendigo, Victoria.

Forster studied a Bachelor of Sports Science at the University of Western Australia.

== Basketball career ==
Forster debuted for the Warwick Senators of the State Basketball League (SBL) in the 2019 season. She scored eight points in a round one win. She helped the Senators reach the SBL Grand Final, where they lost 85–56 to the Rockingham Flames. Forster scored one point in three minutes off the bench in the grand final. In 17 games, she averaged 2.59 points and 1.41 rebounds per game.

In 2020, Forster played for the Senators in the West Coast Classic. In round five, she had a 17-point game. In 12 games, she averaged 8.75 points, 4.17 rebounds and 2.58 assists per game.

Forster joined the Senators for the inaugural NBL1 West season in 2021, scoring 18 points in round one. She had a 23-point game in round 15. In 20 games, she averaged 10.65 points, 4.3 rebounds, 2.2 assists and 1.45 steals per game. That year, she played in the University Basketball League (UBL) for the University of Western Australia, averaging a league-best 27.8 points per game and earning UBL Most Valuable Player honours.

In round one of the 2022 NBL1 West season, Forster set a new career high with 29 points in a Senators win. She helped the Senators finish on top of the ladder with an 18–2 record before going on to reach the NBL1 West Grand Final. In the grand final, the Senators defeated the Willetton Tigers 87–61 to win the NBL1 West championship. Forster recorded two points, three rebounds, five assists and one steal in the grand final. In 20 NBL1 West games, she averaged 15.55 points, 4.45 rebounds, 3.4 assists and 1.5 steals per game. At the 2022 NBL1 National Finals in Melbourne, Forster helped the Senators win the NBL1 National championship, scoring 18 points in the championship game.

On 20 September 2022, Forster signed with the Perth Lynx of the Women's National Basketball League (WNBL) as a development player for the 2022–23 season. She had been a Perth Lynx Academy player in 2020 and a Lynx training player in 2021. Having spent only 15 minutes on the court all season while recording two total points, Forster received an opportunity to play in the regular-season finale on 4 March 2023 after the Lynx rested starters Lauren Scherf and Robbi Ryan, while also playing Sami Whitcomb for only the first half. Forster finished with 12 points, three rebounds, three assists and one steal in 21 minutes in a 107–94 win over the University of Canberra Capitals. She appeared in eight games during the season.

Forster re-joined the Senators for the 2023 NBL1 West season. She was named NBL1 West Youth Player of the Year. In 22 games, she averaged 13.45 points, 5.55 rebounds, 4.36 assists and 1.68 steals per game.

On 26 May 2023, Forster was elevated by the Perth Lynx, signing as a fully contracted player for the 2023–24 WNBL season. In 20 games, she averaged 1.4 points per game.

In the 2024 NBL1 West season, Forster had a career-best year with the Senators, averaging 19.5 points, 6.3 rebounds and 5.9 assists per game. She finished runner-up in the league's MVP voting and earned All-NBL1 West First Team honours, as well as the Golden Hands Award and the league's assist title. She had a 31-point game in the regular-season finale. Following the NBL1 West season, she joined the Northern Kahu of the Tauihi Basketball Aotearoa in New Zealand. In the 2024 Tauihi season, she started eight of 12 games and averaged 7.8 points, 5.1 rebounds, 4 assists in 25.9 minutes per game. She was subsequently named the league's Youth Player of the Year.

Forster re-joined the Senators for the 2025 NBL1 West season. Between round nine and round 11, she had three straight games with 30 or more points, including a 32-point game. She was named All-NBL1 West First Team for the second straight year but ankle injuries limited her at the end of the regular season and during the finals. The Senators reached the 2025 NBL1 West Grand Final, but Forster played in only one of their previous seven matches after injuring her left ankle on 5 July. Upon returning for the qualifying final on 8 August, she then injured her right ankle. She spent the week leading up to the grand final rehabbing her injured ankle. In the grand final, Forster had six points and four assists in a 91–71 loss to the Cockburn Cougars. In 17 games, she averaged 20.06 points, 5.0 rebounds, 5.53 assists and 2.06 steals per game.

On 30 June 2025, Forster signed a two-year deal with the Townsville Fire. On 4 January 2026, having scored 20 points all season, Forster scored a season-high 12 points in an 83–69 win over the Adelaide Lightning. She enjoyed increased minutes leading up to that game in the absence of injured captain Courtney Woods. She helped the Fire win the WNBL championship in the 2025–26 season. In 21 games, she averaged 2.24 points per game.

Forster re-joined the Senators for the 2026 NBL1 West season as team captain. In round one, she had a 31-point game, and in round seven, she had a 35-point game. She was named All-NBL1 West Second Team and earned NBL1 West All-Defensive Team honours. She helped the Senators return to the NBL1 West Grand Final, where they defeated the Cougars 102–76 to win the championship behind Forster's game-high 34 points. She was subsequently named grand final MVP. In 24 NBL1 West games, she averaged 19.79 points, 6.29 rebounds, 5.5 assists and 2.0 steals per game.

Forster re-joined the Fire for the 2026–27 WNBL season.

She is set to re-join the Senators for the 2027 NBL1 West season.
