= Teige Morrell =

American basketball player (born 1995)

No. 3 – Perth Lynx
- Position: Power forward / center
- League: WNBL

Personal information
- Born: December 8, 1995 (age 30) Dubai, UAE
- Listed height: 6 ft 3 in (1.91 m)

Career information
- High school: Los Lunas (Los Lunas, New Mexico)
- College: Nevada (2014–2018)
- WNBA draft: 2018: undrafted
- Playing career: 2019–present

Career history
- 2019: Woodville Warriors
- 2019–2020: Bendigo Spirit
- 2021: Southern Tigers
- 2022–2023: Joondalup Wolves
- 2023–2025: Perth Lynx
- 2024–2025: Lakeside Lightning
- 2025–2026: University of Canberra Capitals
- 2026: Rockingham Flames
- 2026–present: Perth Lynx

Career highlights
- 2× NBL1 West Most Valuable Player (2024, 2025); 4× All-NBL1 West First Team (2022–2025); NBL1 West All-Defensive Team (2024); NBL1 Central champion (2021); NBL1 Central Grand Final MVP (2021); 2× Premier League / NBL1 Central MVP (2019, 2021); 2× Premier League / NBL1 Central All-Star Five (2019, 2021); All-Mountain West Team (2018)

Teige Laine Morrell (née Zeller; born December 8, 1995) is an American professional basketball player for the Perth Lynx of the Women's National Basketball League (WNBL). She played college basketball for the Nevada Wolf Pack before playing professionally in Australia. She won the NBL1 Central MVP in 2019 with the Woodville Warriors and then spent a season with the Bendigo Spirit in the WNBL. In 2021, she helped the Southern Tigers win the NBL1 Central championship behind another MVP season. She joined the Joondalup Wolves of the NBL1 West in 2022 and earned All-NBL1 West First Team honors in 2022 and 2023. After a season with the Perth Lynx in the WNBL, she joined the Lakeside Lightning in 2024 and earned NBL1 West MVP. She returned to the Lynx for a second season in 2024–25 and then won back-to-back NBL1 West MVPs with the Lakeside Lightning in 2025. She spent the 2025–26 season with the University of Canberra Capitals.

Morrell became an Australian permanent resident in 2024.

== Early life ==
Morrell was born in Dubai, United Arab Emirates, to an American father, Marty, and a Zimbabwean mother, Gael. She was the couple's third child; her two older brothers, Roman and Weston, were born in Australia and Cyprus respectively. Her parents met in Perth, Western Australia, and had been globetrotters while her father played or coached basketball in Europe, Australia and the Middle East. The family moved to the United States in 1999 and settled down in New Mexico, where her younger brother Zanen was born.

Morrell attended Los Lunas High School in Los Lunas, New Mexico. Between 2010 and 2014, she played for the girls basketball team coached by her father. She was a two-time All-Metro Player of the Year, two-time Defensive Player of the Year, two-time state basketball tournament MVP, two-time District 6 AAAA Player of the Year, and three-time first-team All-State. The team won a district and state championship in her junior year in 2012–13 and a district title in her senior year in 2013–14. In high school, she also competed in cross country, tennis, volleyball, and track.

== College career ==
As a freshman at Nevada in 2014–15, Morrell appeared in 29 games with two starts, averaging 2.6 points and 2.8 rebounds in 10.0 minutes per game. She had a season-high eight rebounds against Utah State on February 11, and a season-high nine points against New Mexico on February 14.

As a sophomore in 2015–16, Morrell appeared in all 30 games with 21 starts, averaging 7.3 points and 5.9 rebounds in 24.0 minutes per game. She scored in double figures in nine games and posted two double-doubles, including 11 points and a season-high 18 rebounds against San Jose State on February 17, and a season-high 17 points and 13 rebounds against Boise State on March 1.

As a junior in 2016–17, Morrell appeared in all 30 games with 18 starts, averaging 5.6 points, 5.6 rebounds and 1.4 assists in 19.7 minutes per game. She had a season-high 16 rebounds in a triple-overtime win over Hawaii on December 18, and a season-high 14 points against San Diego State on February 12.

As a senior in 2017–18, Morrell played and started in all 36 games, averaging 14.2 points, 8.6 rebounds and 1.3 assists in 28.2 minutes per game. She scored in double figures in 31 games and recorded a career-high 12 double-doubles and six 20-point games, which included career highs of 24 points and 19 rebounds against Stanislaus State on December 12. She was subsequently named to the All-Mountain West Team. She helped the Wolf Pack reach the final of the 2018 Mountain West tournament, where they lost 62–60 to Boise State despite 14 points from Morrell. She was subsequently named to the all-tournament team.

In each of her first three seasons, Morrell earned Mountain West Scholar-Athlete honors and was named to the All-Mountain West academic team.

Following her senior season, Morrell toured internationally with Athletes in Action.

== Professional career ==
Morrell moved to Australia in 2019 to play for the Woodville Warriors of the South Australian Premier League. She was named league MVP and All-Star Five after averaging 22 points and 13 rebounds per game.

On October 18, 2019, Morrell signed with the Bendigo Spirit of the Women's National Basketball League (WNBL) as a short-term injury replacement for Rebecca Tobin. She played three games in her first stint. She re-joined the Spirit in January 2020 as an injury replacement for Marté Grays and played five more games to finish the 2019–20 WNBL season. In eight games, she averaged 1.8 points and 2.8 rebounds per game.

Morrell was set to return to South Australia to play for the Southern Tigers in the rebranded NBL1 Central in the 2020 season, but the season was cancelled due to the COVID-19 pandemic.

Morrell made her debut for the Southern Tigers in the 2021 NBL1 season. She was named NBL1 Central MVP and All-Star Five after averaging 23.1 points and 12.4 rebounds per game. She helped the Tigers reach the NBL1 Central grand final, where they defeated the North Adelaide Rockets 87–77 to win the championship. Morrell was named grand final MVP after recording 27 points and 16 rebounds.

On October 4, 2021, Morrell signed a two-year deal with the Joondalup Wolves of the NBL1 West. In the 2022 season, she was named to the All-NBL1 West First Team. In 22 games, she averaged 21.64 points, 11.18 rebounds, 3.55 assists and 1.32 steals per game.

With the Wolves in the 2023 NBL1 West season, Morrell was named to the All-NBL1 West First Team for the second straight year. In 22 games, she averaged 22.0 points, 12.23 rebounds, 3.05 assists, 1.18 steals and 1.41 blocks per game.

Morrell joined the Perth Lynx as a development player for the 2023–24 WNBL season. She was elevated to the Lynx playing squad in late December 2023 following an injury to import guard Aari McDonald. In her debut for the Lynx on January 3, 2024, she had seven points and four rebounds in 12 minutes off the bench in a 104–91 loss to the Townsville Fire. On January 24, she had 14 points and 10 rebounds in a 90–76 loss to the Melbourne Boomers. The Lynx made the WNBL grand final series in 2023–24, where they lost to the Southside Flyers. In seven games, she averaged 4.9 points and 3.0 rebounds per game.

Morrell joined the Lakeside Lightning for the 2024 NBL1 West season. In her debut for the Lightning on March 28, 2024, she had 27 points and 31 rebounds in an 80–71 overtime win over the Willetton Tigers. She was named NBL1 West Most Valuable Player alongside All-NBL1 West First Team and NBL1 West All-Defensive Team. She became the first player in NBL1 history to win the respective MVP awards across two conferences. She helped the Lightning reach the preliminary final, where they lost 92–86 in overtime to the Rockingham Flames despite Morrell's 20 points, 22 rebounds and nine assists. In 23 games, she averaged 21.39 points, 14.48 rebounds, 3.39 assists, 1.17 steals and 1.13 blocks per game.

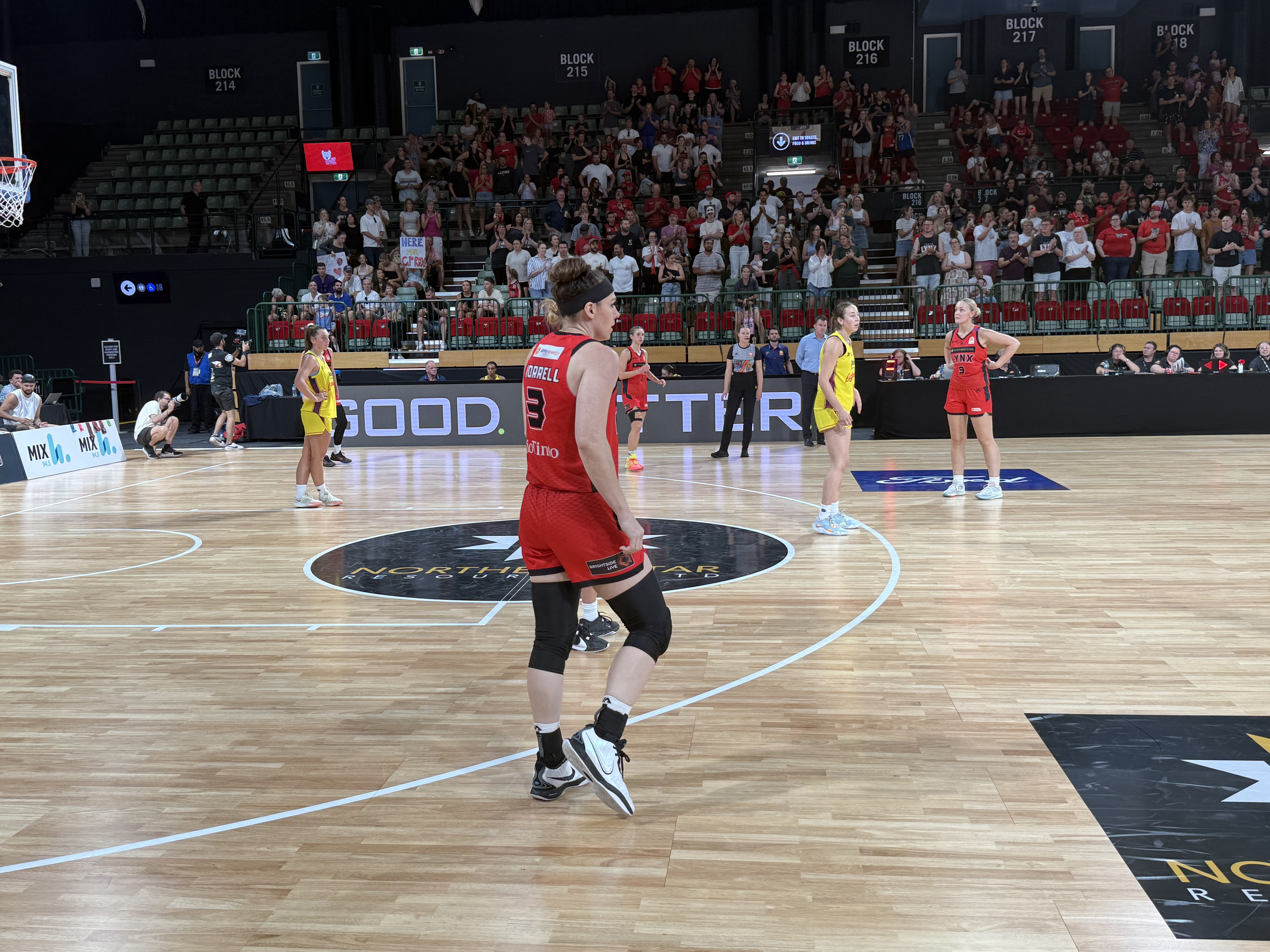
Morrell with the Lynx in January 2025

On July 28, 2024, Morrell re-signed with the Lynx as a fully contracted player for the 2024–25 WNBL season. Having obtained Australian permanent residency, she joined the roster as an unrestricted player. In 21 games, she averaged 3.4 points and 3.0 rebounds per game.

Morrell re-joined the Lakeside Lightning for the 2025 NBL1 West season. On April 17, she recorded 23 points, 23 rebounds and seven assists in an 86–77 win over the South West Slammers. On May 2, she recorded 14 points and 24 rebounds in a 74–65 win over the Joondalup Wolves. On July 12, she recorded 36 points and 15 rebounds in the Lightning's 81–76 loss to the Perry Lakes Hawks. She was named NBL1 West Most Valuable Player for the second straight year and earned All-NBL1 West First Team honours for the fourth straight year. In 20 games, she averaged 21.55 points, 13.5 rebounds, 3.25 assists, 1.6 steals and 1.3 blocks per game.

On July 11, 2025, Morrell signed with the University of Canberra Capitals for the 2025–26 WNBL season. On November 1, 2025, she scored a career-high 15 points in a 73–65 loss to the Adelaide Lightning. In 22 games, she averaged 5.1 points and 4.1 rebounds per game.

In February 2026, Morrell signed with the Rockingham Flames for the 2026 NBL1 West season. In the preliminary final, the Flames lost 90–86 in overtime to the Warwick Senators despite 20 points and 13 rebounds from Morrell. In 21 games, she averaged 18.67 points, 11.67 rebounds and 3.19 assists per game.

On May 21, 2026, Morrell signed with the Perth Lynx for the 2026–27 WNBL season, returning to the team for a second stint.

== Career statistics ==
Legend
GP	Games played	GS	Games started	MPG	Minutes per game	RPG	Rebounds per game
APG	Assists per game	SPG	Steals per game	BPG	Blocks per game	PPG	Points per game
TO	Turnovers per game	FG%	Field-goal percentage	3P%	3-point field-goal percentage	FT%	Free-throw percentage
**Bold**	Career best	°	League leader

=== College ===
Year	Team	GP	GS	MPG	FG%	3P%	FT%	RPG	APG	SPG	BPG	TO	PPG
2014–15	Nevada	29	2	10.1	38.0	50.0	68.4	2.8	0.4	0.2	0.5	0.8	2.6
2015–16	Nevada	30	21	24.0	46.3	0.0	72.9	5.9	0.8	0.8	0.8	1.4	7.3
2016–17	Nevada	29	17	19.8	42.5	0.0	69.6	5.6	1.4	0.6	0.6	1.9	5.8
2017–18	Nevada	36	36	28.2	51.4	0.0	78.0	8.6	1.3	0.6	0.5	1.9	14.2
**Career**		124	76	21.0	47.3	33.3	74.2	5.9	1.0	0.6	0.6	1.5	7.8
Statistics retrieved from Sports-Reference.

== Personal life ==
Morrell's father, Marty, played basketball at New Mexico Military Institute (NMMI) and Baylor University before becoming a professional basketball coach. He had a successful high school coaching career in the 2010s. He returned to Australia in 2024 to coach the Lakeside Lightning women's team in the NBL1 West.

Her brother, Weston, also played basketball at NMMI.

Her husband, David Morrell, is an American basketball coach who also attended the University of Nevada. He accompanied Teige to Australia in 2019 and coached at the same clubs as her until 2023. The couple reunited at the same club and same team in 2026, when David coached Teige on the Rockingham Flames women's team.

In 2023, Morrell applied to become an Australian permanent resident, but delays with her government paperwork meant she was classified as an import for the 2023–24 WNBL season. She gained permanent residency in April 2024.

She is a Christian.
