= Geraldton Buccaneers =

- Leagues: NBL1 West
- Founded: 1989
- History: Men: Geraldton Buccaneers; 1989–present Women: Geraldton Buccaneers; 2005–2008; 2027–
- Arena: Activewest Stadium
- Location: Geraldton, Western Australia
- Team colors: Blue & gold
- President: Peter Brown
- General manager: Andrew Horstman
- Head coach: M: Dayle Joseph; W: Sharni Winter
- Championships: 4
- Website: NBL1.com.au

Geraldton Buccaneers is an NBL1 West club based in Geraldton, Western Australia. The club fields a team in both the Men's and Women's NBL1 West. The club is a division Geraldton Amateur Basketball Association (GABA), the major administrative basketball organisation in the region. The Buccaneers play their home games at Activewest Stadium.

== Club history ==
=== Background ===
Organised men's basketball in Geraldton commenced in 1950, with a women's competition beginning ten years later. The association was officially named the Geraldton Amateur Basketball Association in 1960.

In the 1980s, the Western Australian Basketball Federation sought to expand the Perth-based District Competition and began approaching various business people in the country areas to gauge their interest in a statewide basketball competition. Among those approached were Brian Middleton and Graham Greenaway, residents of Geraldton. Middleton and Greenaway convinced Kevin Jones, the Administrator of the GABA, to join them in establishing a basketball team in Geraldton. With Jones leading the project, Middleton and Greenaway provided funding for the licence and became the team's private owners. They served as the licencees until the GABA eventually bought the rights to the team. Geraldton was joined by Albany and Bunbury, and then Kalgoorlie and Mandurah.

=== SBL / NBL1 West ===
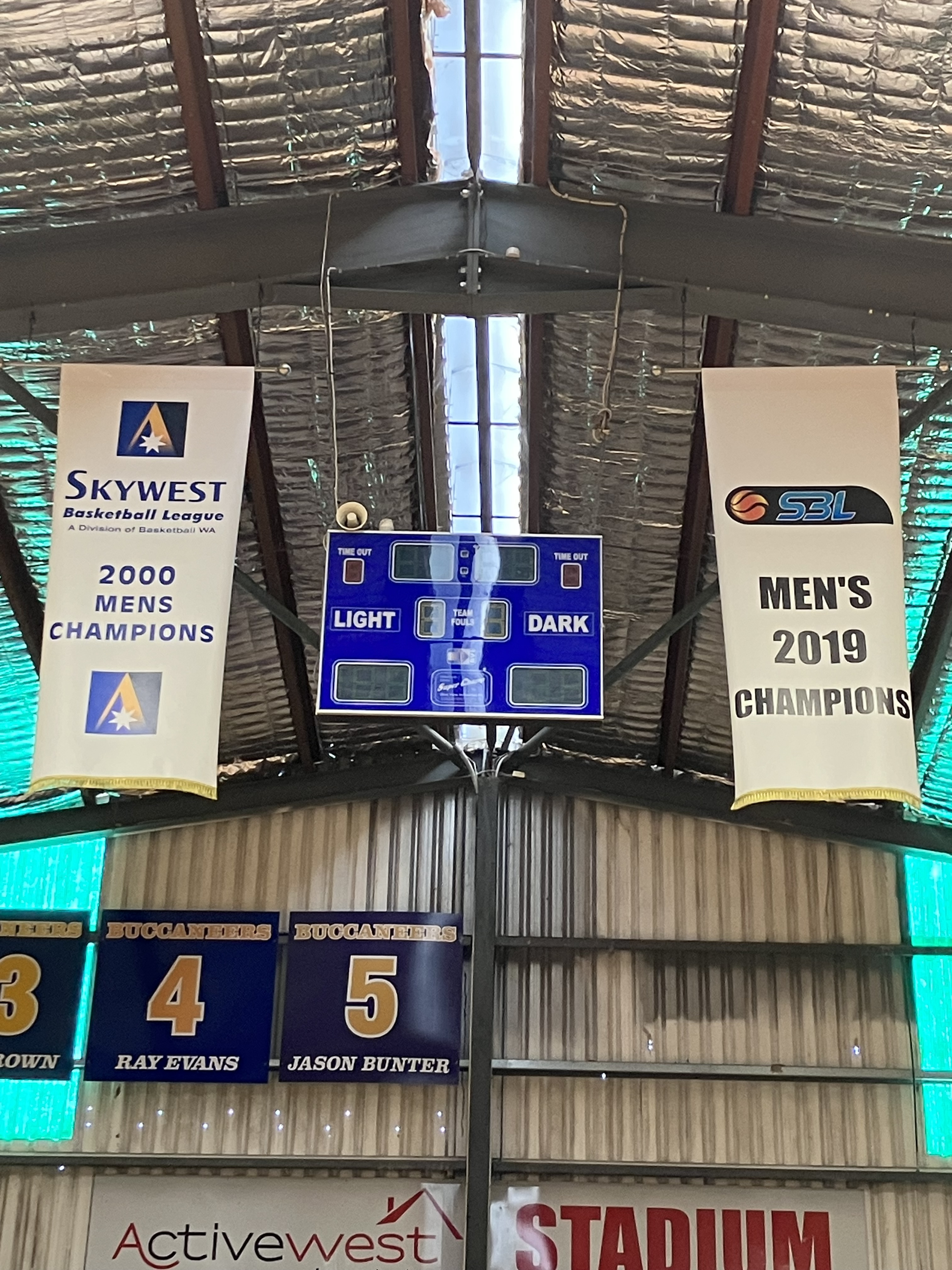
Buccaneers' championship banners at Activewest Stadium, October 2023

1989 saw the formation of the State Basketball League (SBL). Initially known as the Batavia Buccaneers, the team's inaugural coaching staff included head coach Tom McClain, a former player for the Perth Wildcats, and his two assistants, Kevin Jones and Jim O'Dea. Americans Dan Hunt and Brian Fundingsland were the team's first two import players, while Perth native Ray Chamberlain joined the squad. All three players were members of the East Perth Eagles' 1988 premiership team. The Buccaneers finished their inaugural season as minor premiers, earning first place on the standings with a 19–3 record. They defeated the Willetton Tigers 106–93 in the semi-finals before losing 114–89 to the Perth Redbacks in the SBL Grand Final.

In 1993, the Buccaneers won their second minor premiership after finishing the regular season in first place with a 19–5 record. In 1996, they made their first grand final appearance since 1989, where they lost 103–86 to the Bunbury City Slammers. In 1997, they returned to the SBL Grand Final, where they lost 94–92 to the Perth Redbacks.

In 2000, the Buccaneers finished on top of the West Conference table with a league-best 17–2 record. They made it through to their fourth SBL Grand Final, where they defeated the Lakeside Lightning 96–76 to win their maiden championship. In 2001, the team made their fifth grand final appearance in 13 years, where they lost 101–83 to the Perry Lakes Hawks.

In 2005, a Buccaneers women's team entered the Women's SBL for the first time. In four seasons between 2005 and 2008, the team had 18 wins and 72 losses.

In 2011, the Buccaneers men missed the finals for the first time since 1998. They missed the finals again in 2012 before returning to form in 2013 with a playoff appearance. In 2014, the Buccaneers claimed their first minor premiership since 2000 with a 19–7 record and went on to reach their first SBL Grand Final since 2001. In the grand final, they were defeated 99–83 by the East Perth Eagles. The Buccaneers had now won just the one championship from six grand final appearances.

In 2018, the Buccaneers finished the regular season in first place with a 23–3 record. It also marked the team's best regular-season record since 2001, when they finished second at 24–2. They went on to lose to the eighth-seeded Rockingham Flames in the quarter-finals. In 2019, the Buccaneers finished the regular season in third place with a 19–7 record, and after two three-game playoff series, they reached the SBL Grand Final. In the grand final, the Buccaneers defeated the Joondalup Wolves 92–80 to win their second championship.

In 2021, the SBL was rebranded as NBL1 West.

In 2022, the Buccaneers reached their eighth grand final, where they were defeated by the Rockingham Flames 91–79. They returned to the grand final in 2023, where they won their third championship with an 86–80 win over the Joondalup Wolves. In 2024, the Buccaneers finished the regular season in first place with a 20–2 record but went on to lose in the preliminary final to the Willetton Tigers. In 2025, the Buccaneers reached the NBL1 West Grand Final, where they defeated the Warwick Senators 81–78 to win their fourth championship. At the 2025 NBL1 National Finals, the Buccaneers reached the championship game, where they lost 86–67 to the Canberra Gunners. In 2026, the Buccaneers finished the regular season in first place with an 18–3 record and went on to reach the NBL1 West Grand Final. In the grand final, the Buccaneers were defeated 66–62 by the Flames.

==== Women's team return ====
The Buccaneers women's team will make a return to the NBL1 West in 2027. After years of advocacy for the return of a women's team, it was officially announced in September 2026 that the Buccaneers women would enter the 2027 NBL1 West season.

== Notable past players ==
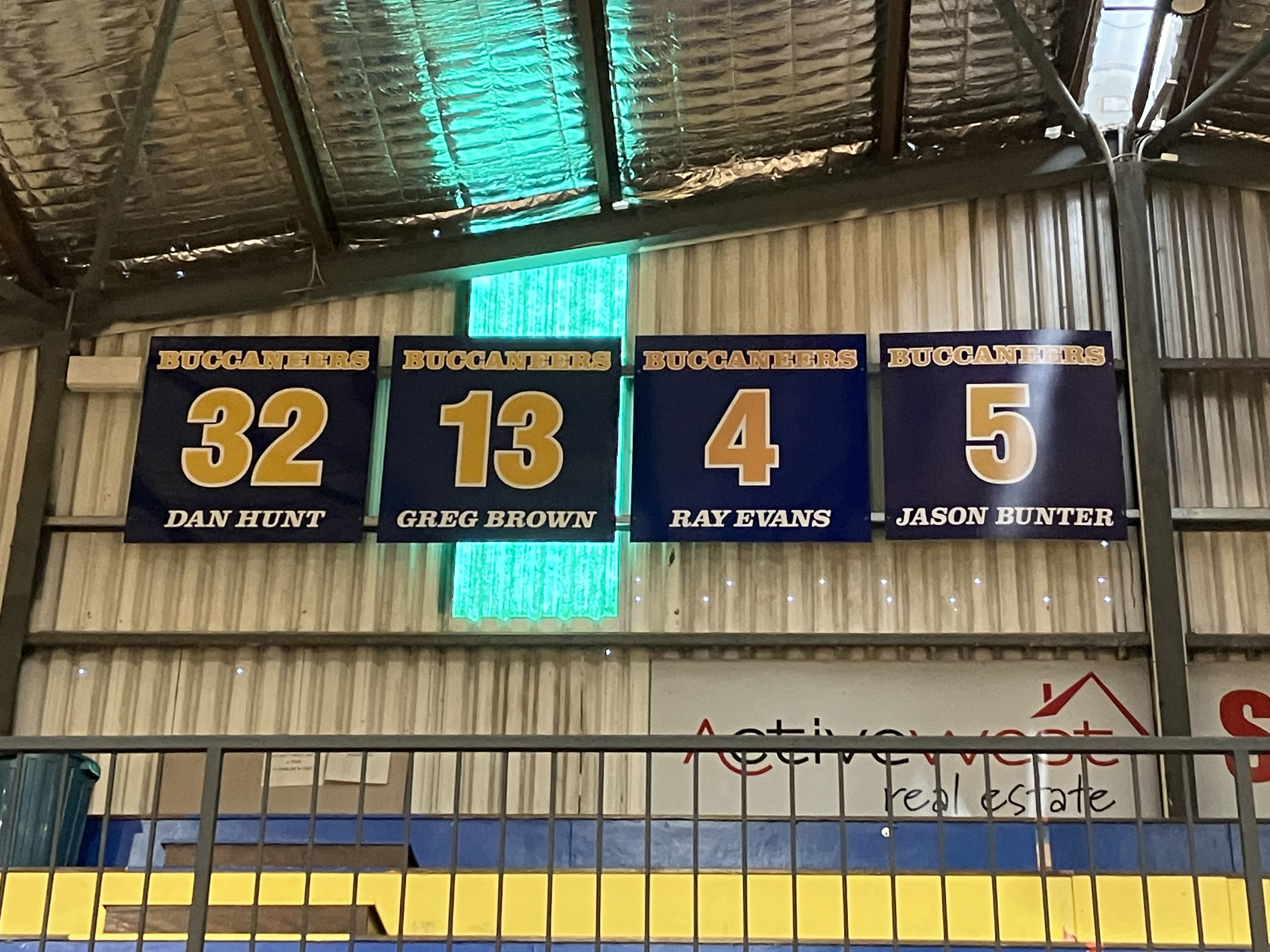
Buccaneers' retired jersey numbers, October 2023

- (Australia) Matthew Adekponya
- (United States) Maurice Barrow
- (New Zealand) Everard Bartlett
- (United States) Dwayne Benjamin
- (Australia) Alex Ducas
- (United States) / (Australia) Bennie Lewis
- (Australia) / (South Sudan) Mathiang Muo
- (Australia) Johny Narkle
- (United States) Earnest Ross
- (United States) / (Italy) Ryan Zamroz

== Accolades ==
Women

- Championships: Nil
- Grand Final appearances: Nil
- Minor premierships: Nil

Men

- Championships: 4 (2000, 2019, 2023, 2025)
- Grand Final appearances: 11 (1989, 1996, 1997, 2000, 2001, 2014, 2019, 2022, 2023, 2025, 2026)
- Minor premierships: 7 (1989, 1993, 2000, 2014, 2018, 2022, 2024, 2026)
