= East Perth Eagles =

- Leagues: NBL1 West
- Founded: 1989
- History: Men: East Perth Eagles; 1989–present Women: East Perth Eagles; 1989–1995; 1997–present
- Arena: Morley Sport and Recreation Centre
- Location: Morley, Western Australia
- Team colors: Blue, white, orange
- President: Mia Filpo
- Vice-president: Michel Bartier
- General manager: Blake Lornie-Duguid
- Head coach: M: Carl Filpo; W: Jonelle Morley
- Championships: 1
- Website: NBL1.com.au

East Perth Eagles is an NBL1 West club based in Perth, Western Australia. The club fields a team in both the Men's and Women's NBL1 West. The club is a division of East Perth District Basketball Association (EPDBA), the major administrative basketball organisation in Perth's north eastern suburbs. The Eagles play their home games at Morley Sport and Recreation Centre.

== Club history ==
=== Background ===
East Perth District Basketball Association (EPDBA) was established in 1946 as a founding member of the Western Australian Basketball Association. The organisation was originally known as the Youth Catholic Workers (YCW) Highgate Basketball Club before being renamed Highgate Basketball Club in 1948. In 1956, along with YMCA (Perth), Highgate was a founding member of the Women's Division of the Western Australian Basketball Association.

In 1972, Highgate Basketball Club was given the task of combining all local basketball clubs in the East Perth Football Club's broad catchment area to form a 'District' Club. The organisation was subsequently renamed North Eastern Suburbs Basketball Association (NESBA), but later changed the name in 1975 to East Perth District Basketball Association to more accurately reflect the organisation's origins and the area represented.

In the District Competition, East Perth's women's team won four straight premierships between 1977 and 1980 while the men's team won premierships in 1980, 1983 and 1988.

=== SBL / NBL1 West ===
1989 saw the formation of the State Basketball League (SBL) with both a men's and women's competition. East Perth, trading as the Eagles, entered a team into both the Men's SBL and Women's SBL. In the inaugural SBL season, both teams made the finals with the men finishing in sixth place with a 12–10 record, while the women finished in fourth place with a 14–7 record. The Eagles struggled for wins across the 1990s and 2000s. The women's team went 0–20 in 1993 and 0–24 in 1998, and even sat out the 1996 season. The club was initially suspended from the 2001 season due to on-court struggles and off-court issues, but both teams were eventually reinstated and did participate in the 2001 season. The club was subjected to a review by the league at the end of the 2001 season and were granted entry into the 2002 season.

At the conclusion of the 2009 season, the men had amassed an overall record of 150 wins and 362 losses (.293 winning percentage), while the women had amassed 78 wins and 356 losses (.180 winning percentage). In 2010, both teams set winning records, with the women having their best season since 1989 with a fifth-place finish and a 14–8 record, while the men had their best season since 1998 with an eighth-place finish and a 13–13 record.

In 2011, the women improved to third place with a club-best 16–6 record after winning their last nine games of the regular season. They advanced through to their first ever WSBL Grand Final, where they were defeated 72–71 by the Willetton Tigers.

In 2012, the men's team finished in fourth place with a team-best 16–10 record and went on to reach their first ever MSBL Grand Final, where they were defeated 105–72 by the Cockburn Cougars. It was the largest losing margin in grand final history.

In 2014, the Eagles returned to the MSBL Grand Final under coach Adam Forde and players Drew Williamson, Tom Jervis, Sunday Dech and Mathiang Muo. Despite finishing in seventh place with a 14–12 record, the Eagles went on to defeat the Rockingham Flames 2–1 in the quarter-finals before sweeping the Perth Redbacks in the semi-finals. In the grand final, the Eagles won their maiden championship with a 99–83 victory over the Geraldton Buccaneers, with Joe-Alan Tupaea earning grand final MVP for his 12 points, 12 rebounds and seven assists.

In 2021, the SBL was rebranded as NBL1 West.

In 2024, the Eagles returned to a redeveloped Morley Sport and Recreation Centre after five years playing at Herb Graham Recreation Centre in Mirrabooka. The men's team went on to make the finals in 2024 for the first time since 2014.

In 2026, the Eagles women reached the NBL1 West preliminary final following a semi-final victory, marking the team's first playoff win since 2011. They went on to lose the preliminary final.

== Accolades ==
Women

- Championships: Nil
- Grand Final appearances: 1 (2011)
- Minor premierships: Nil

Men

- Championships: 1 (2014)
- Grand Final appearances: 2 (2012, 2014)
- Minor premierships: Nil
