= Jarrad Prue =

Australian basketball player (born 1982)

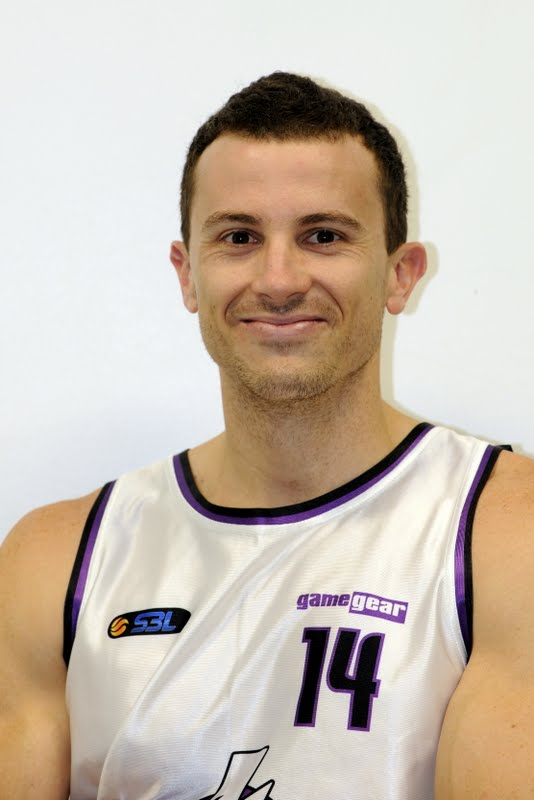
- Prue with the Lakeside Lightning in 2013

Personal information
- Born: 11 February 1982 (age 44)
- Listed height: 198 cm (6 ft 6 in)

Career information
- Playing career: 2003–2021
- Position: Centre
- Coaching career: 2022–present

Career history

Playing
- 2003–2004: Lakeside Lightning
- 2005: Willetton Tigers
- 2006–2015: Lakeside Lightning
- 2013: Perth Wildcats
- 2018–2019; 2021: Lakeside Lightning

Coaching
- 2022; 2025: Lakeside Lightning (assistant)

Career highlights
- 3× SBL champion (2006, 2009, 2013); 3× SBL All-Star Five (2009, 2010, 2014); 2× SBL All-Defensive Five (2018, 2019); 13× SBL / NBL1 West leading rebounder (2004, 2006, 2007, 2009–2015, 2018, 2019, 2021); 8× SBL field goal percentage leader (2007, 2009–2014, 2019); No. 14 retired by Lakeside Lightning

Jarrad Prue (born 11 February 1982) is an Australian former basketball player. He played 15 seasons with the Lakeside Lightning of the NBL1 West between 2003 and 2021 and won three championships. He is the NBL1 West's all-time leading rebounder.

Prue had a three-game stint with the Perth Wildcats of the National Basketball League (NBL) in 2013, and in 2020 was appointed president of the Lakeside Lightning.

== Early life ==
Prue grew up preferring cricket over basketball. He was a Willetton Tigers junior.

== Playing career ==
=== SBL / NBL1 West ===
Prue debuted for the Lakeside Lightning in the State Basketball League (SBL) in 2003. He averaged 3.96 points and 6.4 rebounds in 24 games in his first season and 9.65 points and 18.5 rebounds in 26 games in 2004.

Prue joined the Willetton Tigers for the 2005 SBL season, where he averaged a career-best 14.56 points to go with 14.2 rebounds in nine games.

Prue returned to the Lakeside Lightning for the 2006 season and helped them win the championship after defeating the Goldfields Giants 83–66 in the SBL Grand Final. He had 10 points and 13 rebounds in the grand final. In 30 games, he averaged 12.97 points and 19.1 rebounds per game.

In 2007, Prue helped the Lightning return to the SBL Grand Final, where they were defeated 96–94 by the Giants. He had 18 rebounds in the grand final. In 29 games, he averaged 9.7 points and 15.3 rebounds per game. He earned league awards for Best Field Goal Percentage and Leader in Rebounds per game.

After appearing in just five games in 2008 due to semi-retirement, Prue was captain of the Lightning in 2009 as they returned to the SBL Grand Final, where they defeated the Perry Lakes Hawks 85–77. He had 14 points and 12 rebounds in the grand final. In 30 games, he averaged 11.6 points and 18.5 rebounds per game. He was named to the SBL All-Star Five.

In 2010, the Lightning were once again grand finalists but lost 107–96 to the Willetton Tigers despite Prue's 20 points and 21 rebounds. In 31 games, he averaged 10.6 points and 19.7 rebounds per game. He was again named to the SBL All-Star Five. Following the 2010 season, Prue captained the SBL All-Star Team on a two-game tour to Indonesia.

In 2011, Prue averaged 7.9 points and 21.4 rebounds in 30 games for the Lightning. In 2012, he averaged 10.4 points and 18.8 rebounds in 29 games.

In 2013, Prue played his 250th SBL game, led the league in rebounding for the eighth time, and became the all-time leading SBL rebounder. He was also named in the SBL 25th Year All Star Team. He helped the Lightning return to the SBL Grand Final, where they defeated the Wanneroo Wolves 77–74 behind Prue's 22 rebounds as he claimed his third championship. In 31 games, he averaged 7.9 points and 20.3 rebounds per game. Following the 2013 season, he played for the SBL All-Star Team in an exhibition game against the Perth Wildcats.

In 2014, Prue had 31 rebounds in the season opener against the East Perth Eagles. He went on to record a career-best 24.16 rebounds per game during the regular season. He played his 300th SBL game in game one of the quarter-final series against the Stirling Senators. In 30 games, he averaged 12.0 points and 24.0 rebounds per game. He was named to the SBL All-Star Five. Following the 2014 season, he captained the SBL All-Star Team in another exhibition game against the Perth Wildcats and played for the South All-Stars in the first North v South SBL All-Star game in over a decade.

In 2015, Prue competed in the SBL All-Star Game for the South All-Stars. In the season finale, he had a season-high 32 rebounds in a 99–92 loss to the Goldfields Giants. In 26 games, he averaged 8.0 points and 17.5 rebounds per game. He retired following the 2015 season.

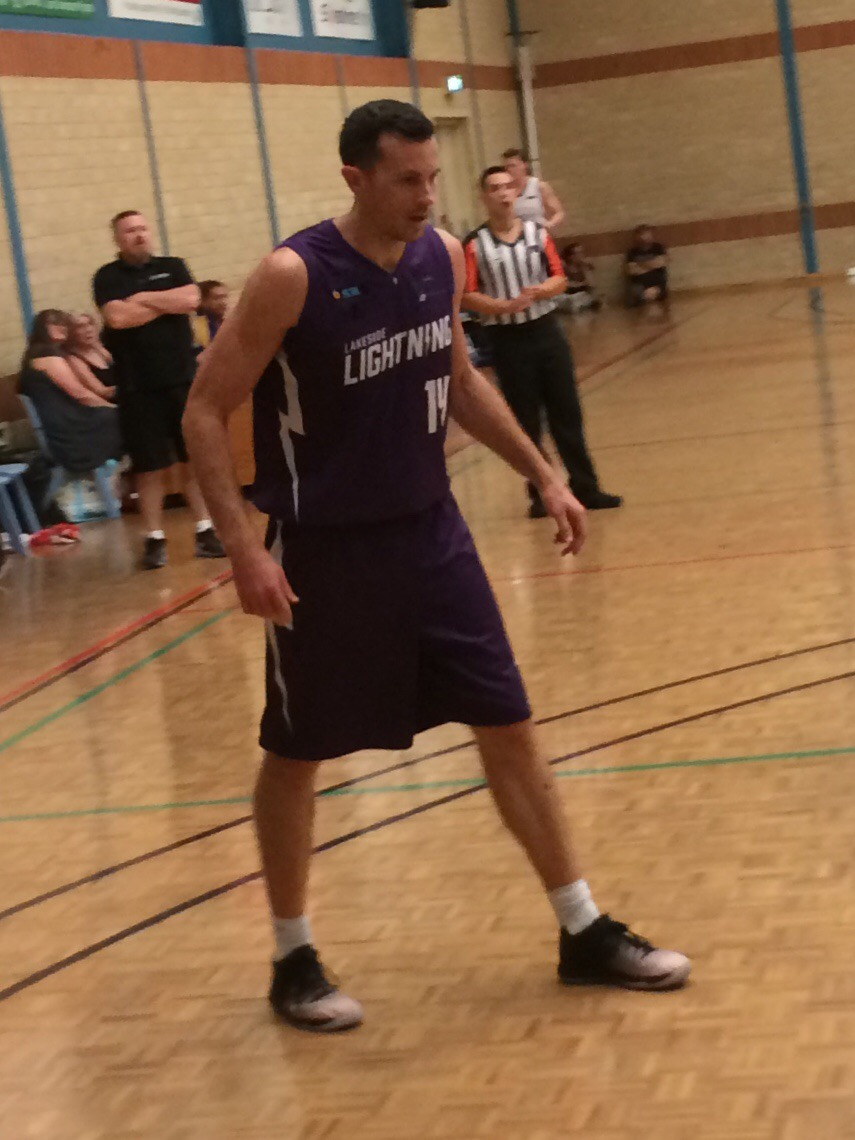
Prue with the Lightning in March 2018

Prue came out of retirement in 2018 to re-join the Lightning. In his first game back, he had 21 rebounds against the Perth Redbacks. On 26 May, he 29 rebounds against the Cockburn Cougars. He competed in the SBL All-Star Game for the South All-Stars. On 6 July, he played his 350th SBL game in a 110–99 win over the South West Slammers. In 28 games, he averaged 6.6 points and 19.3 rebounds per game. He subsequently earned All-Defensive Team honours.

Prue opened the 2019 season with 28 rebounds against the Mandurah Magic, as he celebrated his 350th game for the Lightning. He missed games early in the season with a hamstring injury. He competed in the SBL All-Star Game for the Australian All-Stars. On 19 July, he had 36 rebounds (18 of them offensive) in an 82–80 win over the Kalamunda Eastern Suns. The following night, he had 27 rebounds in a 96–95 win over the Perry Lakes Hawks. In 26 games, he averaged 8.12 points and 18.31 rebounds per game. He subsequently earned All-Defensive Team honours and was the league leader in rebounds per game and field goal percentage.

After not playing in 2020, Prue returned to the Lightning in 2021 for the inaugural NBL1 West season. He recorded 20 rebounds or more three times during the season, including a season-high 23 rebounds on 22 May against the Geraldton Buccaneers. He reached 400 career games in August 2021. He averaged 5.5 points and 15.07 rebounds for the season, and was the league's rebounding leader.

In July 2025, Prue's number 14 jersey was retired by the Lakeside Lightning.

=== NBL ===
In September 2013, Prue had a two-game pre-season trial with the Perth Wildcats of the National Basketball League (NBL). He subsequently signed with the Wildcats on 2 October 2013 as a short-term replacement for injured centre Matthew Knight to start the 2013–14 NBL season. Prue appeared in three games between 18 October and 1 November. In his third game, Prue had seven rebounds in nine minutes of action in an 87–47 win over the Wollongong Hawks. He finished with nine rebounds in his three games. Knight returned from injury in mid November.

With Knight sidelined again in the 2014–15 NBL season, Prue was on the Wildcats' shortlist for injury replacement options.

== Coaching career ==
Prue served as an assistant coach with the Lakeside Lightning men's and women's teams during the 2022 NBL1 West season. He returned as Lightning men's assistant coach for the 2025 NBL1 West season.

== Personal life ==
Prue and his wife, Emma, have two children.

As of 2018, Prue was an auditor and a partner at BDO Australia.

In October 2020, Prue was appointed president of the Lakeside Lightning. He still held the position of president as of April 2023.
