= Mikayla Pivec =

American basketball player

Personal information
- Born: November 18, 1997 (age 28) Lynnwood, Washington, U.S.
- Listed height: 5 ft 10 in (1.78 m)

Career information
- High school: Lynnwood (Bothell, Washington)
- College: Oregon State (2016–2020)
- WNBA draft: 2020: 3rd round, 25th overall pick
- Drafted by: Atlanta Dream
- Playing career: 2020–present
- Position: Guard

Career history
- 2020: Campus Promete
- 2021–2022: Cadi La Seu
- 2022: Montaneras de Morovis
- 2023: Bursa Uludag
- 2023–2024: Albury Wodonga Bandits
- 2023: Cangrejeras de Santurce
- 2023: Waterford Wildcats
- 2023–2024: Casademont Zaragoza
- 2024: Pollitas de Isabela
- 2025: Lointek Gernika Bizkaia
- 2025: Bendigo Braves
- 2026: Mandurah Magic
- 2026: Mainland Pouākai

Career highlights
- All-NBL1 West First Team (2026); 2× NBL1 East All-Star Five (2023, 2024); NBL1 West Golden Hands (2026); Pac-12 All-Defensive Team (2020); 2× All-Pac-12 (2019, 2020); Pac-12 All-Freshman Team (2017)
- Stats at WNBA.com
- Stats at Basketball Reference
Medals
Women's basketball
Representing the United States
Pan American Games
Silver medal – second place	2019 Lima	Team

Mikayla Denali Pivec (born November 18, 1997) is an American professional basketball player who last played for the Mainland Pouākai of the Tauihi Basketball Aotearoa. She played college basketball for the Oregon State Beavers before playing professionally in Spain, Puerto Rico, Turkey, Australia, Ireland and New Zealand.

== Early life ==
Pivec was born in Lynnwood, Washington. She attended Lynnwood High School in nearby Bothell, where she graduated in 2016.

== College career ==
Pivec played college basketball for the Oregon State Beavers between 2016 and 2020.

== Professional career ==
Pivec was selected by the Atlanta Dream with the 25th overall pick in the 2020 WNBA draft. In May, with the 2020 WNBA season in jeopardy due to the COVID-19 pandemic, Pivec opted out of the WNBA season for personal reasons.

On July 13, 2020, Pivec signed with Campus Promete of the Spanish Liga Femenina de Baloncesto. In 15 games during the 2020–21 season between October 3 and December 19, she averaged 5.1 points and 3.1 rebounds per game.

On April 3, 2021, Pivec signed with the Minnesota Lynx for training camp. She was waived by the Lynx on May 13 after appearing in two preseason games.

For the 2021–22 season, Pivec joined Cadi La Seu of the Liga Femenina de Baloncesto. In 34 games, she averaged 9.4 points, 5.7 rebounds and 2.1 assists per game.

In October 2022, Pivec joined Montaneras de Morovis of the Puerto Rican Baloncesto Superior Nacional Femenino (BSNF). In 14 games during the 2022 season, she averaged 16.0 points, 9.8 rebounds, 4.1 assists and 1.7 steals per game.

In January 2023, Pivec joined Bursa Uludag of the Turkish Women's Basketball Super League. In five games between January 7 and February 3, she averaged 5.6 points, 5.2 rebounds and 1.4 assists per game.

On March 3, 2023, Pivec signed with the Atlanta Dream for training camp. She was waived on May 5 prior to the start of the 2023 WNBA season.

Pivec joined the Albury Wodonga Bandits of the NBL1 East in Australia for the 2023 NBL1 season. In 12 games, she averaged 18.9 points, 12.3 rebounds, 7.2 assists and 2.6 steals per game. She had three triple-doubles and was subsequently named to the NBL1 East All-Star Five. She later joined Cangrejeras de Santurce of the BSNF, where she averaged 11.5 points, 7.6 rebounds, 4.9 assists and 1.3 steals in 16 games during the 2023 season.

Pivec started the 2023–24 season with the Waterford Wildcats of the Irish Women's Super League, averaging 23.0 points, 14.0 rebounds, 3.7 assists and 4.0 steals in three games. In November, she joined Casademont Zaragoza of the Liga Femenina de Baloncesto. In 11 league games, she averaged 2.5 points, 2.8 rebounds and 1.2 assists per game. She also averaged 3.6 points, 3.6 rebounds and 1.4 assists in eight EuroLeague games.

Pivec re-joined the Albury Wodonga Bandits for the 2024 NBL1 season, where she had seven triple-doubles and was named the NBL1 East All-Star Five for the second straight year. In 22 games, she averaged 17.8 points, 10.8 rebounds, 9.9 assists and 1.5 steals per game. She later joined Pollitas de Isabela of the BSNF, where she averaged 18.0 points, 11.4 rebounds, 8.0 assists and 2.5 steals in eight games during the 2024 season.

In January 2025, Pivec joined Lointek Gernika Bizkaia of the Liga Femenina de Baloncesto. In 11 games between January 11 and March 15, she averaged 2.5 points and 1.7 rebounds per game.

Pivec joined the Bendigo Braves of the NBL1 South for the 2025 NBL1 season. In nine games, she averaged 14.8 points, 8.4 rebounds, 4.8 assists and 1.9 steals per game.

In February 2026, Pivec signed with the Mandurah Magic of the NBL1 West for the 2026 season. In her debut on April 24, she recorded a triple-double with 21 points, 11 rebounds and 10 assists in an 86–84 win over the Rockingham Flames. On May 22, she recorded 20 points, 14 rebounds and 13 assists in a 96–84 win over the Perth Redbacks. On May 30, she recorded 13 points, 11 rebounds and 11 assists in a 111–68 win over the South West Slammers. On June 21, she recorded 14 points, 15 rebounds and 10 assists in a 91–79 win over the Goldfields Giants. She was named All-NBL1 West First Team and earned the NBL1 West Golden Hands Award. In the Magic's elimination final, Pivec recorded 10 points, 12 rebounds and 15 assists in a 90–81 loss to the Joondalup Wolves.

On September 1, 2026, Pivec signed with the Mainland Pouākai of the Tauihi Basketball Aotearoa for the 2026 season. She was released by the Pouākai on October 20 due to injury.

== National team ==
In May 2019, Pivec was selected to represent Team USA at the 2019 Pan American Games. She started in all five games and averaged 4.2 points, 4.0 rebounds and 2.4 assists per game to help the USA to a 4–1 record and the silver medal.

== Career statistics ==
Legend
GP	Games played	GS	Games started	MPG	Minutes per game	RPG	Rebounds per game
APG	Assists per game	SPG	Steals per game	BPG	Blocks per game	PPG	Points per game
TO	Turnovers per game	FG%	Field-goal percentage	3P%	3-point field-goal percentage	FT%	Free-throw percentage
**Bold**	Career best	°	League leader

=== College ===
Year	Team	GP	GS	MPG	FG%	3P%	FT%	RPG	APG	SPG	BPG	TO	PPG
2016–17	Oregon State	**36**	27	23.3	42.3	27.4	**74.7**	5.0	2.0	0.9	0.3	**1.5**	7.5
2017–18	Oregon State	34	**34**	29.2	45.0	34.8	73.7	7.1	**5.0**	0.8	0.3	2.9	11.1
2018–19	Oregon State	34	**34**	**34.2**	**52.6**	**41.7**	71.1	9.2	3.4	0.9	**0.5**	2.2	**15.2**
2019–20	Oregon State	32	32	34.0	50.1	36.1	72.6	**9.3**	4.5	**1.1**	0.3	2.4	14.8
**Career**		136	127	30.0	48.2	34.9	72.7	7.6	3.7	0.9	0.4	2.3	12.1
Statistics retrieved from Sports-Reference.
