= 2007 State Basketball League season =

- League: State Basketball League
- Sport: Basketball
- Duration: 30 March – 4 August (Regular season); 10 August – 8 September (Finals)
- Games: 24 (men); 22 (women)
- Teams: 13 (men); 12 (women)

Regular season
- Minor premiers: M: Lakeside Lightning; W: Stirling Senators
- Season MVP: M: Aaron Shaw (Lightning); W: Christine Boyd (Redbacks)
- Top scorer: M: Jason Harris (Buccaneers); W: Christine Boyd (Redbacks)

Finals
- Champions: M: Goldfields Giants; W: Perry Lakes Hawks
- Runners-up: M: Lakeside Lightning; W: Stirling Senators
- Grand Final MVP: M: Shamus Ballantyne (Giants); W: Carli Boyanich (Hawks)

SBL seasons
- ← 2006 2008 →

The 2007 State Basketball League season was the 19th season of the State Basketball League (SBL). The regular season began on Friday 30 March and ended on Saturday 4 August. The finals began on Friday 10 August and concluded with the women's grand final on Friday 7 September and the men's grand final on Saturday 8 September.

== Regular season ==
The regular season began on Friday 30 March and ended on Saturday 4 August after 18 rounds of competition.

=== Standings ===
Men's ladder

Pos
Pos	Team	W	L
1	Lakeside Lightning	20	4
2	Goldfields Giants	17	7
3	Willetton Tigers	16	8
4	Geraldton Buccaneers	15	9
5	Perry Lakes Hawks	14	10
6	Cockburn Cougars	14	10
7	Rockingham Flames	14	10
8	Stirling Senators	14	10
9	Wanneroo Wolves	10	14
10	Bunbury Slammers	7	17
11	East Perth Eagles	7	17
12	Perth Redbacks	5	19
13	Mandurah Magic	3	21

Women's ladder

Pos
Pos	Team	W	L
1	Stirling Senators	20	2
2	Willetton Tigers	18	4
3	Perry Lakes Hawks	18	4
4	Lakeside Lightning	14	8
5	Mandurah Magic	13	9
6	Wanneroo Wolves	12	10
7	Perth Redbacks	12	10
8	Cockburn Cougars	8	14
9	Rockingham Flames	7	15
10	Geraldton Buccaneers	4	18
11	Bunbury Slammers	3	19
12	East Perth Eagles	3	19

== Finals ==
The finals began on Friday 10 August and consisted of three rounds. The finals concluded with the women's grand final on Friday 7 September and the men's grand final on Saturday 8 September.

=== Men's bracket ===
Quarter-finals
1	Lakeside Lightning	103	103	X
8	Stirling Senators	76	92	X
4	Geraldton Buccaneers	108	113	69
5	Perry Lakes Hawks	118	101	89
2	Goldfields Giants	86	131	122
7	Rockingham Flames	91	81	74
3	Willetton Tigers	83	87	X
6	Cockburn Cougars	110	97	X

Semi-finals
1	Lakeside Lightning	86	79	X
5	Perry Lakes Hawks	77	66	X
2	Goldfields Giants	101	105	X
6	Cockburn Cougars	91	70	X

Grand Final
Lakeside Lightning	94	X	X
Goldfields Giants	96	X	X

==== Grand Final summary ====
8 September 2007
8:00pm

Box score
Report

Goldfields Giants 96, Lakeside Lightning 94
Scoring by quarter: 29–28, 22–32, 16–17, 29–17
Pts: Hulme, Ballantyne 18 each Rebs: Ty Shaw 18; Asts: Shamus Ballantyne 6	Pts: Charleston Long 31; Rebs: Jarrad Prue 18; Asts: Aaron Shaw 5
Goldfields wins SBL Championship

Perry Lakes Basketball Stadium, Floreat
MVP: Shamus Ballantyne (Giants)

=== Women's bracket ===
Quarterfinals
1	Stirling Senators	67	62	X
6	Wanneroo Wolves	66	35	X
2	Willetton Tigers	75	69	76
5	Mandurah Magic	67	73	62
3	Perry Lakes Hawks	81	85	X
4	Lakeside Lightning	72	54	X

Semifinals
1W	Stirling Senators	63	71	X
1L	Lakeside Lightning	53	50	X
2W	Willetton Tigers	68	58	67
3W	Perry Lakes Hawks	71	53	79

Grand final
Stirling Senators	40
Perry Lakes Hawks	66

==== Grand Final summary ====
7 September 2007
7:45pm

Box score
Report

Stirling Senators 40, Perry Lakes Hawks 66
Pts: Alicia Rinaldi 12; Rebs: Alicia Rinaldi 8 Asts: Devenney, Langford 2 each	Pts: Ca. Boyanich, Duff 17 each Rebs: Tanya Kelly 10; Asts: Whitney Perret 8
Perry Lakes wins SBL Championship

Perry Lakes Basketball Stadium, Floreat
MVP: Carli Boyanich (Hawks)

== Awards ==
=== Statistics leaders ===
Category	Men's Player	Team	Women's Player	Team
Points	Jason Harris	Geraldton Buccaneers	Christine Boyd	Perth Redbacks
Rebounds	Jarrad Prue	Lakeside Lightning	Shelly Boston	Rockingham Flames
Assists	Joel Wagner	Perth Redbacks	Tanya Kelly	Perry Lakes Hawks
Steals	Charleston Long	Lakeside Lightning	Casey Mihovilovich	Mandurah Magic
Blocks	Robert Epps	Willetton Tigers	Shelly Boston	Rockingham Flames
Field goal percentage	Jarrad Prue	Lakeside Lightning	Sophia Kelly	Perth Redbacks
3-pt field goal percentage	Doug Gates	Wanneroo Wolves	Jessica Spinner	Wanneroo Wolves
Free throw percentage	Ben Hunt	Willetton Tigers	Carly Wilson	Stirling Senators

=== Regular season ===
- Men's Most Valuable Player: Aaron Shaw (Lakeide Lightning)
- Women's Most Valuable Player: Christine Boyd (Perth Redbacks)
- Men's Coach of the Year: Andy Stewart (Lakeside Lightning)
- Women's Coach of the Year: Rick Morcom (Perry Lakes Hawks)
- Men's Most Improved Player: Joel Wagner (Perth Redbacks)
- Women's Most Improved Player: Jessica Bone (Lakeside Lightning)
- Men's All Star First Team:
  - Michael Lay (Geraldton Buccaneers)
  - Aaron Shaw (Lakeide Lightning)
  - Jason Harris (Geraldton Buccaneers)
  - Robert Epps (Willetton Tigers)
  - Ty Shaw (Goldfields Giants)
- Men's All Star Second Team:
  - Shamus Ballantyne (Goldfields Giants)
  - Ben Hunt (Willetton Tigers)
  - Jeff Dowdell (Wanneroo Wolves)
  - Jarrad Prue (Lakeside Lightning)
  - Sean Sonderleiter (Perry Lakes Hawks)
- Men's All Star Third Team:
  - Joel Wagner (Perth Redbacks)
  - Chris Stephens (Rockingham Flames)
  - Charleston Long (Lakeside Lightning)
  - Kyle Kunkel (Stirling Senators)
  - Damian Matacz (Wanneroo Wolves)
- Women's All Star First Team:
  - Tanya Kelly (Perry Lakes Hawks)
  - Myra Donkin (Lakeside Lightning)
  - Carly Wilson (Stirling Senators)
  - Liz Cooke (Stirling Senators)
  - Christine Boyd (Perth Redbacks)
- Women's All Star Second Team:
  - Casey Mihovilovich (Mandurah Magic)
  - Melissa Marsh (Willetton Tigers)
  - Emma Pass (Cockburn Cougars)
  - Carli Boyanich (Perry Lakes Hawks)
  - Shelly Boston (Rockingham Flames)
- Women's All Star Third Team:
  - Tegan Walker (Geraldton Buccaneers)
  - Sue Williams (Willetton Tigers)
  - Jessica Spinner (Wanneroo Wolves)
  - Kaye Tucker (Mandurah Magic)
  - Jessica Bone (Lakeside Lightning)

=== Finals ===
- Men's Grand Final MVP: Shamus Ballantyne (Goldfields Giants)
- Women's Grand Final MVP: Carli Boyanich (Perry Lakes Hawks)
