= 2006 State Basketball League season =

- League: State Basketball League
- Sport: Basketball
- Duration: 31 March – 5 August (Regular season); 11 August – 9 September (Finals)
- Games: 24 (men); 22 (women)
- Teams: 13 (men); 12 (women)

Regular season
- Minor premiers: M: Willetton Tigers; W: Mandurah Magic
- Season MVP: M: Justin Brown (Eagles); W: Tanya Kelly (Hawks)
- Top scorer: M: Curtis Marshall (Buccaneers); W: Christine Boyd (Redbacks)

Finals
- Champions: M: Lakeside Lightning; W: Lakeside Lightning
- Runners-up: M: Goldfields Giants; W: Mandurah Magic
- Grand Final MVP: M: Ben Earle (Lightning); W: Kristi Channing (Lightning)

SBL seasons
- ← 2005 2007 →

The 2006 State Basketball League season was the 18th season of the State Basketball League (SBL). The regular season began on Friday 31 March and ended on Saturday 5 August. The finals began on Friday 11 August and concluded with the women's grand final on Friday 8 September and the men's grand final on Saturday 9 September.

== Regular season ==
The regular season began on Friday 31 March and ended on Saturday 5 August after 18 rounds of competition.

=== Standings ===
Men's ladder

Pos
| Pos | Team | W | L |
|---|---|---|---|
| 1 | Willetton Tigers | 21 | 3 |
| 2 | Goldfields Giants | 21 | 3 |
| 3 | Perry Lakes Hawks | 17 | 7 |
| 4 | Geraldton Buccaneers | 15 | 9 |
| 5 | Lakeside Lightning | 14 | 10 |
| 6 | Cockburn Cougars | 12 | 12 |
| 7 | Stirling Senators | 12 | 12 |
| 8 | Wanneroo Wolves | 11 | 13 |
| 9 | Rockingham Flames | 10 | 14 |
| 10 | East Perth Eagles | 9 | 15 |
| 11 | Perth Redbacks | 8 | 16 |
| 12 | Mandurah Magic | 5 | 19 |
| 13 | Bunbury Slammers | 1 | 23 |

Women's ladder

Pos
| Pos | Team | W | L |
|---|---|---|---|
| 1 | Mandurah Magic | 19 | 3 |
| 2 | Willetton Tigers | 18 | 4 |
| 3 | Lakeside Lightning | 15 | 7 |
| 4 | Perry Lakes Hawks | 14 | 8 |
| 5 | Perth Redbacks | 14 | 8 |
| 6 | Rockingham Flames | 13 | 9 |
| 7 | Wanneroo Wolves | 12 | 10 |
| 8 | Cockburn Cougars | 11 | 11 |
| 9 | Stirling Senators | 6 | 16 |
| 10 | Bunbury Slammers | 4 | 18 |
| 11 | Geraldton Buccaneers | 4 | 18 |
| 12 | East Perth Eagles | 2 | 20 |

== Finals ==
The finals began on Friday 11 August and consisted of three rounds. The finals concluded with the women's grand final on Friday 8 September and the men's grand final on Saturday 9 September.

=== Men's bracket ===
Quarter-finals
1 | Willetton Tigers | 75 | 112 | X
8 | Wanneroo Wolves | 74 | 82 | X
4 | Geraldton Buccaneers | 84 | 70 | 79
5 | Lakeside Lightning | 81 | 75 | 97
2 | Goldfields Giants | 115 | 112 | X
7 | Stirling Senators | 99 | 95 | X
3 | Perry Lakes Hawks | 104 | 94 | 95
6 | Cockburn Cougars | 113 | 61 | 105

Semi-finals
1 | Willetton Tigers | 81 | 94 | X
5 | Lakeside Lightning | 87 | 109 | X
2 | Goldfields Giants | 104 | 99 | X
6 | Cockburn Cougars | 89 | 78 | X

Grand Final
Lakeside Lightning | 83 | X | X
Goldfields Giants | 66 | X | X

==== Grand Final summary ====
9 September 2006
7:45pm

Box score
Report

Goldfields Giants 66, Lakeside Lightning 83
| Pts: Shamus Ballantyne 16; Rebs: Burch, T. Shaw 18 each Asts: Williamson, T. Shaw 5 each | Pts: Ben Earle 32; Rebs: Jarrad Prue 13; Asts: Aaron Shaw 10 |
Lakeside wins SBL Championship

Perry Lakes Basketball Stadium, Floreat
MVP: Ben Earle (Lightning)

=== Women's bracket ===
Quarterfinals
1 | Mandurah Magic | 67 | 56 | X
6 | Rockingham Flames | 53 | 47 | X
2 | Willetton Tigers | 70 | 57 | 74
5 | Perth Redbacks | 73 | 56 | 63
3 | Lakeside Lightning | 75 | 79 | 70
4 | Perry Lakes Hawks | 78 | 75 | 67

Semifinals
1W | Mandurah Magic | 66 | 67 | 59
1L | Perry Lakes Hawks | 67 | 42 | 51
2W | Lakeside Lightning | 78 | 48 | 65
3W | Willetton Tigers | 68 | 61 | 58

Grand final
Mandurah Magic | 53
Lakeside Lightning | 56

==== Grand Final summary ====
8 September 2006
7:45pm

Box score
Report

Mandurah Magic 53, Lakeside Lightning 56
| Pts: Gemma Thomas 22; Rebs: Kaye Tucker 9 Asts: Casey Mihovilovich 4 | Pts: Kristi Channing 22; Rebs: Jessica Bone 14; Asts: Erin Scholz 4 |
Lakeside wins SBL Championship

Perry Lakes Basketball Stadium, Floreat
MVP: Kristi Channing (Lightning)

== Awards ==
=== Statistics leaders ===
| Category | Men's Player | Team | Women's Player | Team |
|---|---|---|---|---|
| Points | Curtis Marshall | Geraldton Buccaneers | Christine Boyd | Perth Redbacks |
| Rebounds | Jarrad Prue | Lakeside Lightning | Brooke Hiddlestone | Perth Redbacks |
| Assists | Shamus Ballantyne | Goldfields Giants | Tanya Kelly | Perry Lakes Hawks |
| Steals | Andrew McLennan | Stirling Senators | Casey Mihovilovich | Mandurah Magic |
| Blocks | Justin Brown | East Perth Eagles | Danielle Ramsay | Willetton Tigers |
| Field goal percentage | N/A | | N/A | |
| 3-pt field goal percentage | Leon Williamson | Goldfields Giants | Tanya Kelly | Perry Lakes Hawks |
| Free throw percentage | Bryce Burch | Goldfields Giants | Brooke Hiddlestone | Perth Redbacks |

=== Regular season ===
- Men's Most Valuable Player: Justin Brown (East Perth Eagles)
- Women's Most Valuable Player: Tanya Kelly (Perry Lakes Hawks)
- Men's Coach of the Year: Steve Charlton (Goldfields Giants)
- Women's Coach of the Year: Jason Kyle (Mandurah Magic)
- Men's Most Improved Player: Greg Hire (Wanneroo Wolves)
- Women's Most Improved Player: Ainsleigh Sanders (Wanneroo Wolves)
- Men's All-Star Five:
  - Shamus Ballantyne (Goldfields Giants)
  - Carmichael Olowoyo (Stirling Senators)
  - Luke Mackay (Perth Redbacks)
  - Ty Shaw (Goldfields Giants)
  - Paul Rogers (Willetton Tigers)
- Women's All-Star Five:
  - Tanya Kelly (Perry Lakes Hawks)
  - Melinda Bartlett (Wanneroo Wolves)
  - Kristi Channing (Lakeside Lightning)
  - Brooke Hiddlestone (Perth Redbacks)
  - Christine Boyd (Perth Redbacks)

=== Finals ===
- Men's Grand Final MVP: Ben Earle (Lakeside Lightning)
- Women's Grand Final MVP: Kristi Channing (Lakeside Lightning)
