= 2008 State Basketball League season =

- League: State Basketball League
- Sport: Basketball
- Duration: 28 March – 2 August (Regular season); 8 August – 6 September (Finals)
- Games: 26 (men); 24 (women)
- Teams: 14 (men); 13 (women)

Regular season
- Minor premiers: M: Perry Lakes Hawks; W: Willetton Tigers
- Season MVP: M: Curtis Marshall (Buccaneers); W: Deanna Smith (Hawks)
- Top scorer: M: Curtis Marshall (Buccaneers); W: Deanna Smith (Hawks)

Finals
- Champions: M: Goldfields Giants; W: Perry Lakes Hawks
- Runners-up: M: Willetton Tigers; W: Willetton Tigers
- Grand Final MVP: M: Darnell Dialls (Giants); W: Deanna Smith (Hawks)

SBL seasons
- ← 2007 2009 →

The 2008 State Basketball League season was the 20th season of the State Basketball League (SBL). The regular season began on Friday 28 March and ended on Saturday 2 August. The finals began on Friday 8 August and concluded with the women's grand final on Friday 5 September and the men's grand final on Saturday 6 September.

== Regular season ==
The regular season began on Friday 28 March and ended on Saturday 2 August after 19 rounds of competition.

=== Standings ===
Men's ladder

Pos
Pos	Team	W	L
1	Perry Lakes Hawks	21	5
2	Rockingham Flames	21	5
3	Goldfields Giants	19	7
4	Geraldton Buccaneers	18	8
5	Cockburn Cougars	17	9
6	Wanneroo Wolves	17	9
7	Lakeside Lightning	15	11
8	Willetton Tigers	13	13
9	Kalamunda Eastern Suns	12	14
10	Stirling Senators	9	17
11	Perth Redbacks	6	20
12	Bunbury Slammers	6	20
13	Mandurah Magic	4	22
14	East Perth Eagles	4	22

Women's ladder

Pos
Pos	Team	W	L
1	Willetton Tigers	22	2
2	Perry Lakes Hawks	22	2
3	Cockburn Cougars	17	7
4	Stirling Senators	16	8
5	Mandurah Magic	15	9
6	Kalamunda Eastern Suns	13	11
7	Perth Redbacks	13	11
8	Wanneroo Wolves	11	13
9	Rockingham Flames	9	15
10	Lakeside Lightning	6	18
11	Bunbury Slammers	6	18
12	Geraldton Buccaneers	5	19
13	East Perth Eagles	1	23

== Finals ==
The finals began on Friday 8 August and consisted of three rounds. The finals concluded with the women's grand final on Friday 5 September and the men's grand final on Saturday 6 September.

=== Men's bracket ===
Quarter-finals
1	Perry Lakes Hawks	76	94	75
8	Willetton Tigers	99	89	99
4	Geraldton Buccaneers	94	100	115
5	Cockburn Cougars	104	97	118
2	Rockingham Flames	99	105	X
7	Lakeside Lightning	101	116	X
3	Goldfields Giants	123	130	X
6	Wanneroo Wolves	101	107	X

Semi-finals
8	Willetton Tigers	98	103	X
5	Cockburn Cougars	96	95	X
7	Lakeside Lightning	94	88	X
3	Goldfields Giants	104	103	X

Grand Final
Willetton Tigers	82	X	X
Goldfields Giants	101	X	X

==== Grand Final summary ====
6 September 2008
7:30 pm

Box score
Report

Goldfields Giants 101, Willetton Tigers 82
Scoring by quarter: 24–14, 24–17, 25–24, 28–27
Pts: Darnell Dialls 32; Rebs: Darnell Dialls 16; Asts: Ryan Hulme 5	Pts: Robert Epps 29; Rebs: Kunkel, Epps 13 each Asts: Greg Regan 4
Goldfields wins SBL Championship

Perry Lakes Basketball Stadium, Floreat
MVP: Darnell Dialls (Giants)

=== Women's bracket ===
Quarter-finals
1	Willetton Tigers	96	86	X
8	Wanneroo Wolves	72	52	X
4	Stirling Senators	62	77	53
5	Mandurah Magic	65	50	50
2	Perry Lakes Hawks	69	79	X
7	Perth Redbacks	61	73	X
3	Cockburn Cougars	66	58	X
6	Kalamunda Eastern Suns	68	67	X

Semi-finals
1	Willetton Tigers	81	64	X
4	Stirling Senators	55	60	X
2	Perry Lakes Hawks	100	84	X
6	Kalamunda Eastern Suns	64	63	X

Grand Final
Willetton Tigers	69	X	X
Perry Lakes Hawks	87	X	X

==== Grand Final summary ====
5 September 2008
7:30 pm

Box score
Report

Willetton Tigers 69, Perry Lakes Hawks 87
Scoring by quarter: 12–24, 16–22, 17–17, 24–24
Pts: Rebecca Duke 20; Rebs: Marsh, Duke 9 each Asts: Melissa Marsh 4	Pts: Deanna Smith 39; Rebs: Chelsea Boyanich 13; Asts: Kelly, Malajczuk 6 each
Perry Lakes wins SBL Championship

Perry Lakes Basketball Stadium, Floreat
MVP: Deanna Smith (Hawks)

== Awards ==
=== Statistics leaders ===
Category	Men's Player	Team	Women's Player	Team
Points	Curtis Marshall	Geraldton Buccaneers	Deanna Smith	Perry Lakes Hawks
Rebounds	Kenny Harris	Perth Redbacks	Dana Jones	Geraldton Buccaneers
Assists	Joel Wagner	Perth Redbacks	Kim Malajczuk; Fleur McIntyre	Perry Lakes Hawks; Cockburn Cougars
Steals	Michael Lay	Geraldton Buccaneers	Jessica Van Schie	Lakeside Lightning
Blocks	Stephen Newman	Kalamunda Eastern Suns	Sarah Brodie	East Perth Eagles
Field goal percentage	Gavin Field	Cockburn Cougars	Natalie Burton	Perry Lakes Hawks
3-pt field goal percentage	Joseph Nixon	Kalamunda Eastern Suns	Tanya Kelly	Perry Lakes Hawks
Free throw percentage	Adam Caporn	Rockingham Flames	Deanna Smith	Perry Lakes Hawks

=== Regular season ===
The 2008 Basketball WA Annual Awards Night was held on Saturday 21 September at the Parmelia Hilton in Perth.

- Men's Most Valuable Player: Curtis Marshall (Geraldton Buccaneers)
- Women's Most Valuable Player: Deanna Smith (Perry Lakes Hawks)
- Men's Coach of the Year: John Gardiner (Perry Lakes Hawks)
- Women's Coach of the Year: Robyn Winter (Willetton Tigers) & Gary McKay (Cockburn Cougars)
- Men's Most Improved Player: Chris Dodd (Stirling Senators)
- Women's Most Improved Player: Natalie Burton (Perry Lakes Hawks)
- Men's All Star First Team:
  - Curtis Marshall (Geraldton Buccaneers)
  - Michael Lay (Geraldton Buccaneers)
  - Peter Crawford (Perry Lakes Hawks)
  - Jeff Dowdell (Wanneroo Wolves)
  - Sean Sonderleiter (Perry Lakes Hawks)
- Men's All Star Second Team:
  - Adam Caporn (Rockingham Flames)
  - Joseph Nixon (Kalamunda Eastern Suns)
  - Carmichael Olowoyo (Stirling Senators)
  - Tom Garlepp (Perry Lakes Hawks)
  - Damian Matacz (Wanneroo Wolves)
- Men's All Star Third Team:
  - Joe-Alan Tupaea (Perry Lakes Hawks)
  - Ben Hunt (Willetton Tigers)
  - Chris Dodd (Stirling Senators)
  - Christian Moody (Lakeside Lightning)
  - Michael Haney (Goldfields Giants)
- Women's All Star First Team:
  - Tanya Kelly (Perry Lakes Hawks)
  - Deanna Smith (Perry Lakes Hawks)
  - Rebecca Duke (Willetton Tigers)
  - Carly Wilson (Stirling Senators)
  - Eleanor Haring (Stirling Senators)
- Women's All Star Second Team:
  - Samantha Richards (Mandurah Magic)
  - Rebecca Mercer (Kalamunda Eastern Suns)
  - Teagan Walker (Geraldton Buccaneers)
  - Brooke Hiddlestone (Perth Redbacks)
  - Natalie Burton (Perry Lakes Hawks)
- Women's All Star Third Team:
  - Kate Malpass (Willetton Tigers)
  - Melissa Marsh (Willetton Tigers)
  - Liz Cooke (Stirling Senators)
  - Ashley Gilmore (Lakeside Lightning)
  - Dana Jones (Geraldton Buccaneers)

=== Finals ===
- Men's Grand Final MVP: Darnell Dialls (Goldfields Giants)
- Women's Grand Final MVP: Deanna Smith (Perry Lakes Hawks)
