= NBL1 West Grand Final Most Valuable Player Award =

Annual NBL1 West awards

The NBL1 West Grand Final Most Valuable Player is an annual NBL1 West award given to the best performing player in both the Women's Grand Final and Men's Grand Final. Known as the State Basketball League (SBL) Grand Final Most Valuable Player from 1996 (earliest known case) to 2019, the SBL was rebranded to NBL1 West in 2021.

== Winners ==
Denotes players that won the award as a member of the losing grand final side.

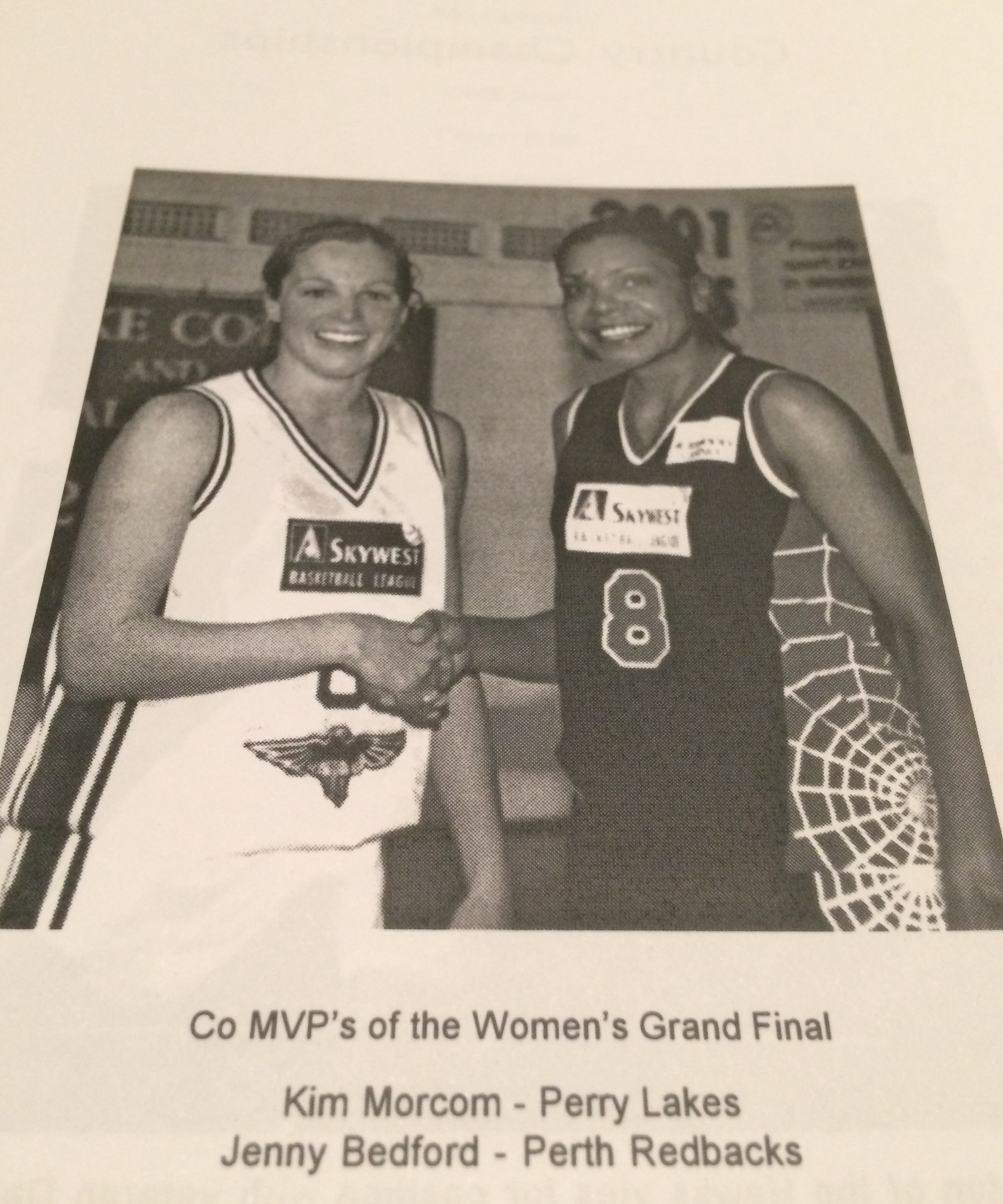
Morcom (Hawks) and Bedford (Redbacks), co-MVPs in 2001

Year	Women		Men		Ref
Year	Player	Team	Player	Team	Ref
1996	Tully Bevilaqua	Willetton Tigers	James Fitch	Bunbury City Slammers	
1997	Tully Bevilaqua (2)	Willetton Tigers	Dwayne Michaels	Perth Redbacks	
1998	Jenny Whittle	Perry Lakes Hawks	James Fitch (2)	Bunbury City Slammers	
1999	Rohanee Cox	Willetton Tigers	James Fitch (3)	Bunbury City Slammers	
2000	Jenny Bedford	Perth Redbacks	Greg Brown	Geraldton Buccaneers	
2001	Kim Morcom	Perry Lakes Hawks	Matt Burston	Perry Lakes Hawks	
2001	Jenny Bedford (2)	Perth Redbacks	Matt Burston	Perry Lakes Hawks	
2002	Kate Simkovic	Perry Lakes Hawks	Stephen Black	Willetton Tigers	
2003	Melissa McClure	Perry Lakes Hawks	Alan Erickson	Cockburn Cougars	
2004	Melissa Marsh	Willetton Tigers	Eric Carter	Perry Lakes Hawks	
2005	Sue Williams	Willetton Tigers	Andy Gilbert	Lakeside Lightning	
2006	Kristi Channing	Lakeside Lightning	Ben Earle	Lakeside Lightning	
2007	Carli Boyanich	Perry Lakes Hawks	Shamus Ballantyne	Goldfields Giants	
2008	Deanna Smith	Perry Lakes Hawks	Darnell Dialls	Goldfields Giants	
2009	Ashley Gilmore	Willetton Tigers	Luke Payne	Lakeside Lightning	
2010	Jasmine Hooper	Willetton Tigers	Cameron Tovey	Willetton Tigers	
2011	Kate Malpass	Willetton Tigers	Greg Hire	Wanneroo Wolves	
2012	Kim Sitzmann	South West Slammers	Jeremiah Wilson	Cockburn Cougars	
2013	Nikita-Lee Martin	Wanneroo Wolves	Justin Cecil	Lakeside Lightning	
2014	Sami Whitcomb	Rockingham Flames	Joe-Alan Tupaea	East Perth Eagles	
2015	Sami Whitcomb (2)	Rockingham Flames	Trian Iliadis	Joondalup Wolves	
2016	Kate Malpass (2)	Willetton Tigers	Rhett Della	Cockburn Cougars	
2017	Antonia Farnworth	Perry Lakes Hawks	Lee Roberts	Perth Redbacks	
2018	Alison Schwagmeyer	Lakeside Lightning	Ben Purser	Perry Lakes Hawks	
2019	Maddie Allen	Rockingham Flames	Liam Hunt	Geraldton Buccaneers	
2020	Season cancelled due to COVID-19 pandemic				
2021	Alexandra Sharp	Willetton Tigers	Andrew Ferguson	Perry Lakes Hawks	
2022	Leonie Fiebich	Warwick Senators	Devondrick Walker	Rockingham Flames	
2023	Stephanie Gorman	Cockburn Cougars	Johny Narkle	Geraldton Buccaneers	
2024	Alexandra Sharp (2)	Rockingham Flames	Joel Murray	Mandurah Magic	
2025	Ruby Porter	Cockburn Cougars	Johny Narkle (2)	Geraldton Buccaneers	
2026	Chloe Forster	Warwick Senators	Isaac White	Rockingham Flames	
