= NBL1 West Most Valuable Player Award =

Annual basketball award

The NBL1 West Most Valuable Player (MVP) is an annual NBL1 West award given to the best performing player of the regular season. Known as the State Basketball League (SBL) MVP from 1989 to 2019, the SBL was rebranded to NBL1 West in 2021.

In 2022, the Women's MVP award was named in honour of Casey Mihovilovich after she broke the league's all-time games record.

== Winners ==
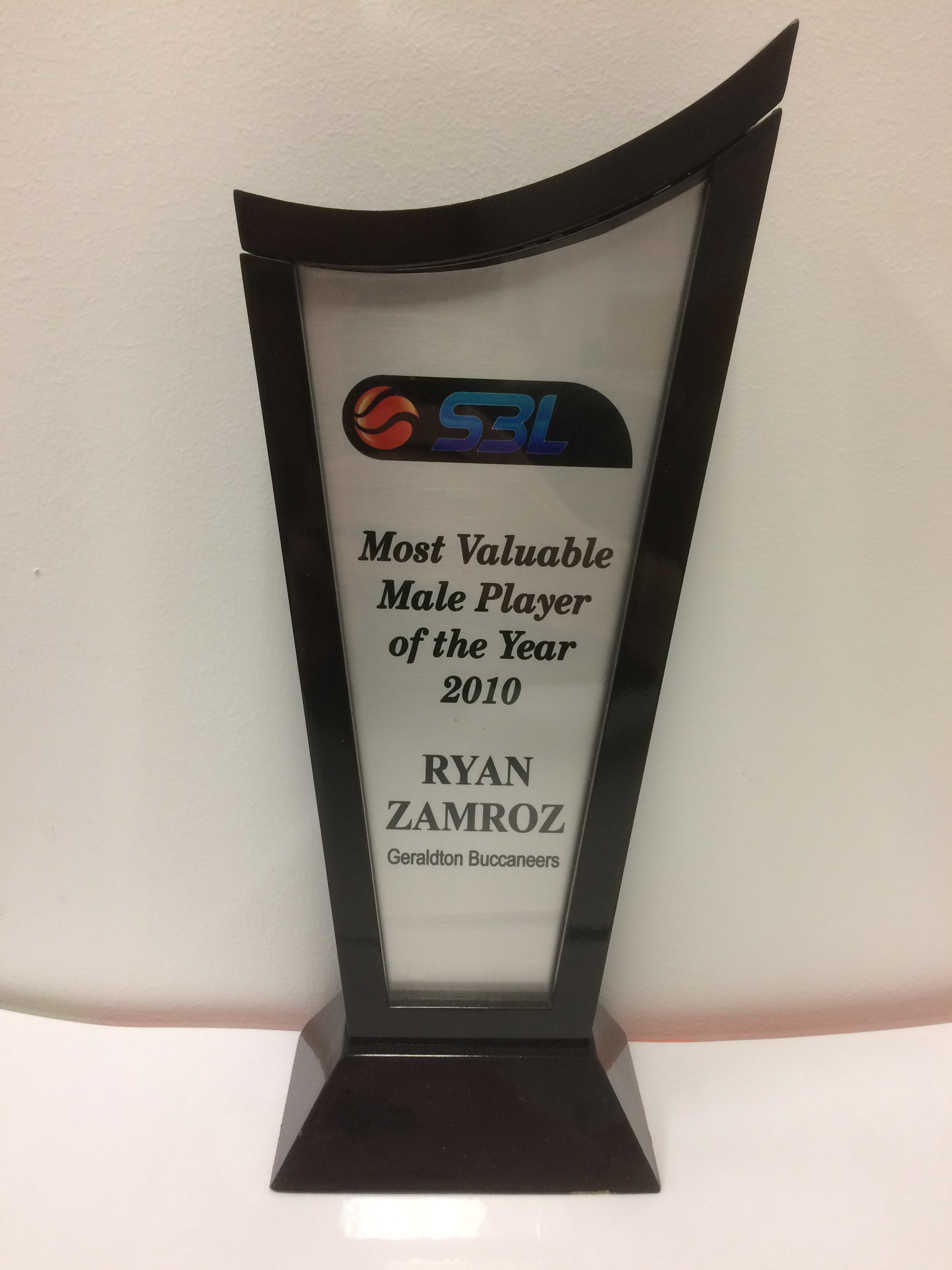
Ryan Zamroz's 2010 MVP trophy

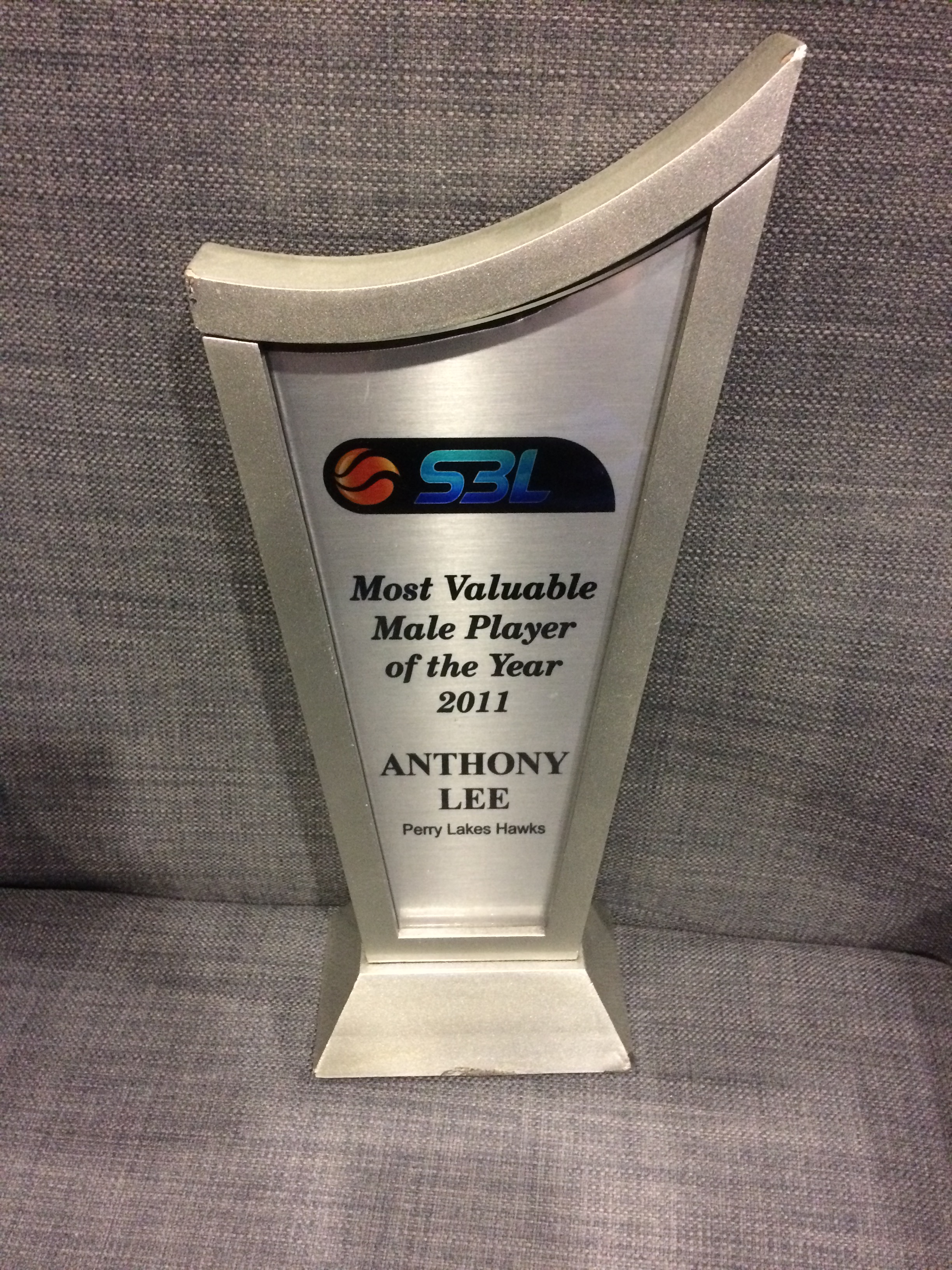
Anthony Lee's 2011 MVP trophy

Year	Women		Men		Ref
Year	Player	Team	Player	Team	Ref
1989	Sue Arthur	Cockburn Cougars	Jeff Anderson; Peter Hansen	Willetton Tigers; Perry Lakes Hawks	
1990	Fiona Robinson	Stirling Senators	Jeff Anderson (2)	Willetton Tigers	
1991	Lisa Vlahov	Perth Redbacks	Carl Gonder	Kanyana Kings	
1992	Fiona Robinson (2)	Stirling Senators	Vince Kelley	Wanneroo Wolves	
1993	Katrine Linssen	Perth Redbacks	Ken Epperson	Swan City Mustangs	
1994	Claire Hotchin	Perry Lakes Hawks	Dapreis Owens	Stirling Senators	
1995	Tanya Fisher	Perth Redbacks	John Pierce	Stirling Senators	
1996	Katrine Linssen (2)	Perth Redbacks	Gerald Jarmon	Albany Raiders	
1997	Brooke Ryan	Mandurah Magic	Dwayne Michaels	Perth Redbacks	
1998	Katrine Linssen (3)	Perth Redbacks	Alan Erickson	Cockburn Cougars	
1999	Melissa McClure	Perry Lakes Hawks	Matt Foster	Willetton Tigers	
2000	Megan Clarke	Willetton Tigers	Anthony Exeter	Rockingham Flames	
2001	Megan Clarke (2)	Willetton Tigers	Jeff Bevington; Justin Lyons	Geraldton Buccaneers; Cockburn Cougars	
2002	Jenny Crouse	Lakeside Lightning	Jarrad Mohr; Kurt Slabolepszy	Swan City Mustangs; Stirling Senators	
2003	Tegan Walker	East Perth Eagles	Greg Brown	Geraldton Buccaneers	
2004	Jasmine Finnigan	Stirling Senators	Ryan Neill	Perth Redbacks	
2005	Rohanee Cox	Willetton Tigers	Eric Brand	Geraldton Buccaneers	
2006	Tanya Kelly	Perry Lakes Hawks	Justin Brown	East Perth Eagles	
2007	Christine Boyd	Perth Redbacks	Aaron Shaw	Lakeside Lightning	
2008	Deanna Smith	Perry Lakes Hawks	Curtis Marshall	Geraldton Buccaneers	
2009	Brooke Hiddlestone	Perth Redbacks	Luke Meyer	Geraldton Buccaneers	
2010	Kaye Tucker	Rockingham Flames	Ryan Zamroz	Geraldton Buccaneers	
2011	Casey Mihovilovich	Mandurah Magic	Anthony Lee	Perry Lakes Hawks	
2012	Emma Cannon	Rockingham Flames	Damian Matacz	Wanneroo Wolves	
2013	Sami Whitcomb	Rockingham Flames	Ben Beran	Lakeside Lightning	
2014	Sami Whitcomb (2)	Rockingham Flames	Cooper Land	Rockingham Flames	
2015	Sami Whitcomb (3)	Rockingham Flames	Ray Turner	Perth Redbacks	
2016	Alison Schwagmeyer	Lakeside Lightning	Cooper Land (2)	Rockingham Flames	
2017	Alison Schwagmeyer (2)	Lakeside Lightning	Jacob Holmen	Goldfields Giants	
2018	Alison Schwagmeyer (3)	Lakeside Lightning	Jalen Billups	Joondalup Wolves	
2019	Stacey Barr	Warwick Senators	Joshua Braun	Kalamunda Eastern Suns	
2020	Season cancelled due to COVID-19 pandemic				
2021	Alexandra Sharp	Willetton Tigers	Nic Pozoglou	Cockburn Cougars	
2022	Stacey Barr (2)	Warwick Senators	Devondrick Walker	Rockingham Flames	
2023	Alexandra Sharp (2)	Willetton Tigers	Devondrick Walker (2)	Rockingham Flames	
2024	Teige Morrell	Lakeside Lightning	Joel Murray	Mandurah Magic	
2025	Teige Morrell (2)	Lakeside Lightning	Isaac White	Rockingham Flames	
2026	Jessie Edwards	Cockburn Cougars	Isaac White (2)	Rockingham Flames	
