= State Basketball League Most Improved Player Award =

The State Basketball League Most Improved Player was an annual State Basketball League (SBL) award given between 2004 and 2019 to the player who has shown the most progress during the season compared to previous seasons in both the Men's SBL and Women's SBL.

== Winners ==
Year	WSBL		MSBL		Ref
Year	Player	Team	Player	Team	Ref
2004	Samantha Duff	Wanneroo Wolves	Cameron Tovey	Willetton Tigers	
2005	Renee Wharekura	Perry Lakes Hawks	Matthew Schmechtig	Wanneroo Wolves	
2006	Ainsleigh Sanders	Wanneroo Wolves	Greg Hire	Wanneroo Wolves	
2007	Jessica Bone	Lakeside Lightning	Joel Wagner	Perth Redbacks	
2008	Natalie Burton	Perry Lakes Hawks	Chris Dodd	Stirling Senators	
2009	Courtney Hargreaves	Willetton Tigers	Ben Purser	Perry Lakes Hawks	
2010	Jasmine Hooper	Willetton Tigers	Seb Salinas	Wanneroo Wolves	
2011	Rosie Tobin	Perry Lakes Hawks	Damien Scott	Cockburn Cougars	
2012	Adrienne Jones	Kalamunda Eastern Suns	Michael Vigor	Perth Redbacks	
2013	Gabby O'Sullivan	Perth Redbacks	Nikolas Iliadis	Stirling Senators	
2014	Alix Hayward	Perth Redbacks	Sunday Dech	East Perth Eagles	
2015	Ashleigh Grant	Lakeside Lightning	Rhys Vague	East Perth Eagles	
2016	Amy Kidner	Joondalup Wolves	Jayden Coburn	Stirling Senators	
2017	Chelsea Belcher	Joondalup Wolves	Corey Shervill	Lakeside Lightning	
2018	Jewel Williams	Kalamunda Eastern Suns	Travis Durnin	South West Slammers	
2019	Matilda Muir	Cockburn Cougars	Luke Travers	Rockingham Flames	
2020	Season cancelled due to COVID-19 pandemic				
