= Deanna Smith =

Australian basketball player (born 1980)

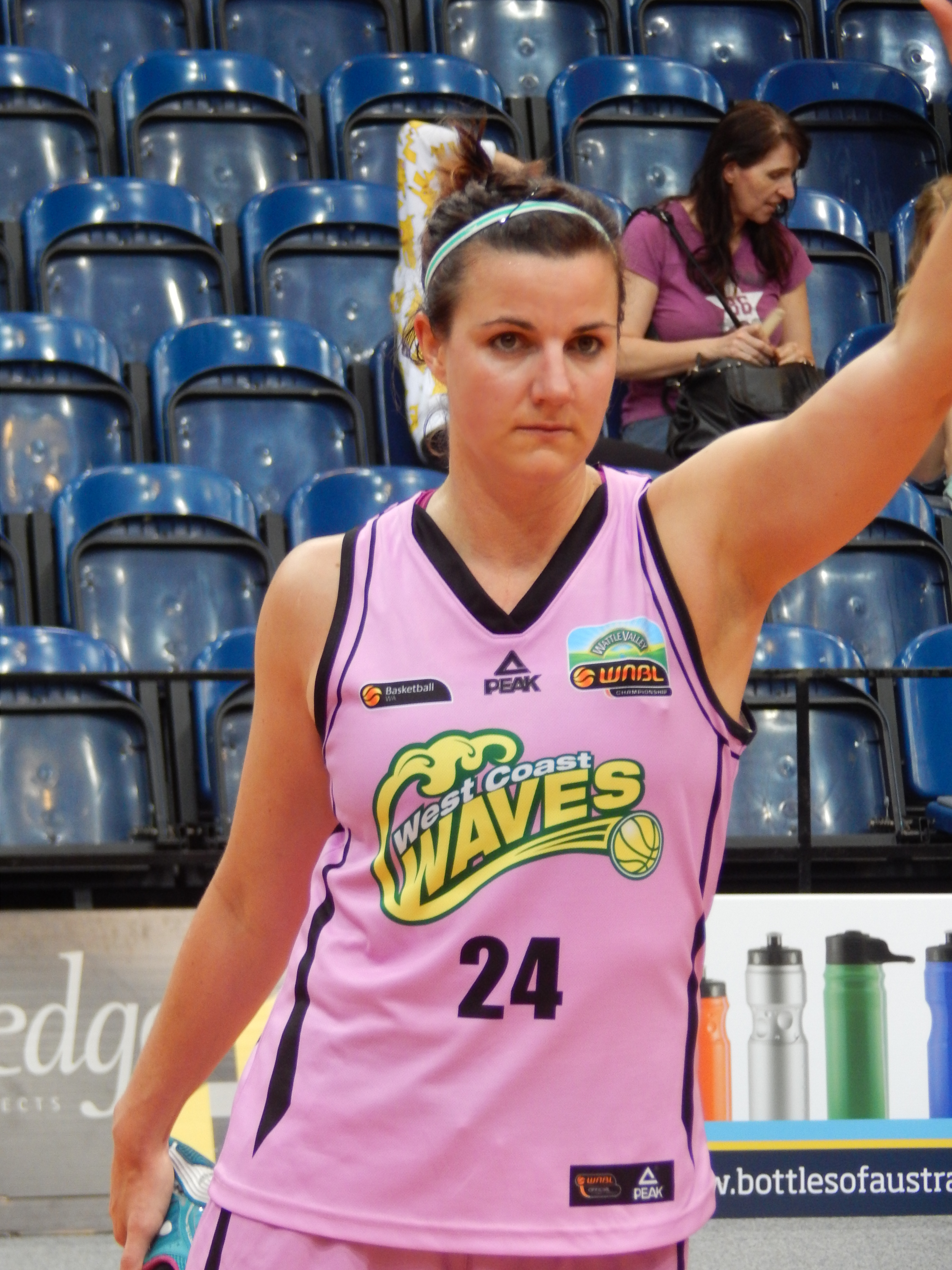
- Smith with the West Coast Waves in 2014

Personal information
- Born: 24 December 1980 (age 45) Bendigo, Victoria, Australia (Note: WNBL rosters in 2011–12 and 2012–13 list her birthplace as Bendigo, Victoria, while rosters in 2007–08 and 2009–10 list her birthplace as Geelong, Victoria.)
- Listed height: 179 cm (5 ft 10 in)

Career information
- Playing career: 1996–2016
- Position: Guard
- Coaching career: 2014–present

Career history

Playing
- 1996: Melbourne Tigers
- 1997–1999: AIS
- 1999: Bendigo Braves
- 1999–2000: Canberra Capitals
- 2000: Warrnambool Mermaids
- 2000–2004: Adelaide Lightning
- 2003–2004: South Adelaide Panthers
- 2004–2005: Manchester Mystics
- 2005: Nunawading Spectres
- 2005–2009: Perth Lynx
- 2006: CAB Madeira
- 2006: Ballarat Miners
- 2007: Nunawading Spectres
- 2008–2009: Perry Lakes Hawks
- 2009–2010: Sydney Uni Flames
- 2010: Kilsyth Cobras
- 2011–2012: Geelong Supercats
- 2011–2012: Bendigo Spirit
- 2012–2015: West Coast Waves
- 2014–2015: Cockburn Cougars
- 2016: Perry Lakes Hawks

Coaching
- 2014–2015: Cockburn Cougars
- 2017–2021: Perry Lakes Hawks
- 2022–2025: Bendigo Spirit (assistant)
- 2025: Bendigo Braves

Career highlights
- As player: 2× WNBL champion (1999, 2000); 3× WNBL All-Star Five (2006, 2009, 2010); WNBL scoring champion (2006); Portuguese League champion (2006); SBL champion (2008); SBL Grand Final MVP (2008); SBL MVP (2008); 3× SBL All-Star Five (2008, 2009, 2015); 2× SBL scoring champion (2008, 2009); SEABL champion (1999); As coach: SBL champion (2017)

Deanna Louise Smith (born 24 December 1980) is an Australian basketball coach and former player. She played the majority of her career in the Women's National Basketball League (WNBL), winning two WNBL championships and earning three WNBL All-Star Five honours. She also played wheelchair basketball in the Women's National Wheelchair Basketball League (WNWBL), becoming the first player to play in both the WNBL and WNWBL.

== Early life ==
Smith was born in Bendigo, Victoria. She represented Country Victoria at U16 (1995) and U18 (1996 and 1997) Australian Junior Championships, winning in 1996 and 1997 and captaining in 1997. She was All Australian in 1995, 1996 and 1997.

== Professional career ==
=== WNBL and Europe ===
Smith debuted in the Women's National Basketball League (WNBL) in 1996 with the Melbourne Tigers. She subsequently played the next three seasons with the Australian Institute of Sport (AIS), where she won the 1999 WNBL championship. For the 1999–2000 WNBL season, she joined the Canberra Capitals and helped the team win the championship. Between 2000 and 2004, she played for the Adelaide Lightning.

After a season with the Manchester Mystics in the British League, Smith joined the Perth Lynx for the 2005–06 WNBL season. She earned WNBL All-Star Five and the top scoring trophy for the 2005–06 season. Following the WNBL season, she had a brief stint with Portuguese team CAB Madeira, helping them win the 2005–06 championship.

Smith was on the Perth Lynx roster in 2006–07 and 2007–08, but she did not play. She played her second season for the Lynx in 2008–09 and earned her second WNBL All-Star Five recognition.

For the 2009–10 WNBL season, Smith joined the Sydney Uni Flames. She subsequently earned her third WNBL All-Star Five recognition. She was sidelined for the entire 2010–11 WNBL season before returning with the Bendigo Spirit in 2011–12. She returned to Perth in 2012 and joined the West Coast Waves. Having managed only half-a-dozen games in 2012–13 due to a foot fracture, Smith made just three appearances for the Waves in 2013–14 before suffering a cartilage tear in her knee. She returned to action in 2014–15 and played her 250th WNBL game that season.

=== State Leagues ===
Smith played many seasons in the Australian State Leagues. She played for the Bendigo Braves in the South East Australian Basketball League (SEABL) in 1999 and the Warrnambool Mermaids in Big V in 2000. She averaged 26 points per game with Warrnambool.

In 2003 and 2004, Smith won back-to-back Central ABL best and fairest awards playing for the South Adelaide Panthers.

Smith played in the SEABL for the Nunawading Spectres in 2005, Ballarat Miners in 2006, and again for Nunawading in 2007.

In 2008 and 2009, Smith played for the Perry Lakes Hawks in the State Basketball League (SBL). In her first season, she helped the Hawks win the SBL championship and earned the Grand Final MVP. She was also named SBL MVP in 2008 as well as SBL All-Star Five in 2008 and 2009. She was also SBL scoring champion both seasons.

Smith returned to the SEABL and played for the Kilsyth Cobras in 2010 and the Geelong Supercats in 2011 and 2012. She then returned to the SBL where she served as player-coach for the Cockburn Cougars in 2014 and 2015 before finishing with the Perry Lakes Hawks in 2016.

== Coaching career ==
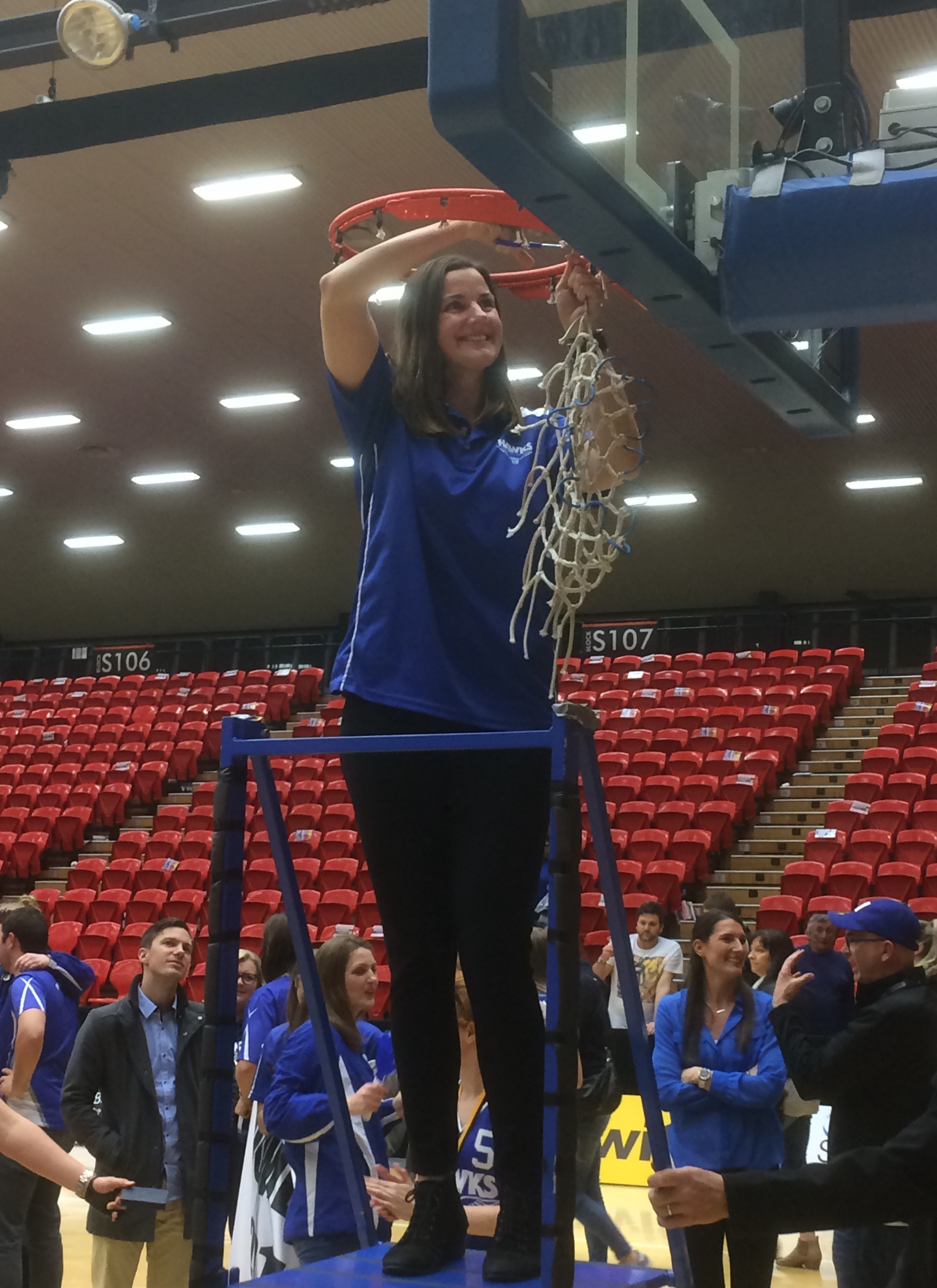
Smith with the Perry Lakes Hawks in 2017

In November 2016, Smith was appointed head coach of the Perry Lakes Hawks women's team for the 2017 SBL season. Four months later, she announced her retirement from playing basketball. The team won the opening eight games of the season as Smith guided the Hawks to the minor premiership with a 20–2 record. They went on to reach the SBL Grand Final, where they defeated the Mandurah Magic 59–48 to win the championship. She parted ways with the Hawks in October 2021.

In October 2022, Smith was appointed an assistant coach of the Bendigo Spirit ahead of the 2022–23 WNBL season. She returned to the Spirit for a second season as assistant coach in 2023–24, and a third season in 2024–25.

Smith served as head coach of the Bendigo Braves women's team in the NBL1 South during the 2025 NBL1 season.

== National team ==
Smith represented Australia in 2002 at the South East Asian Games and was an Australian Opals squad member from 2005 to 2010.

== Wheelchair basketball ==
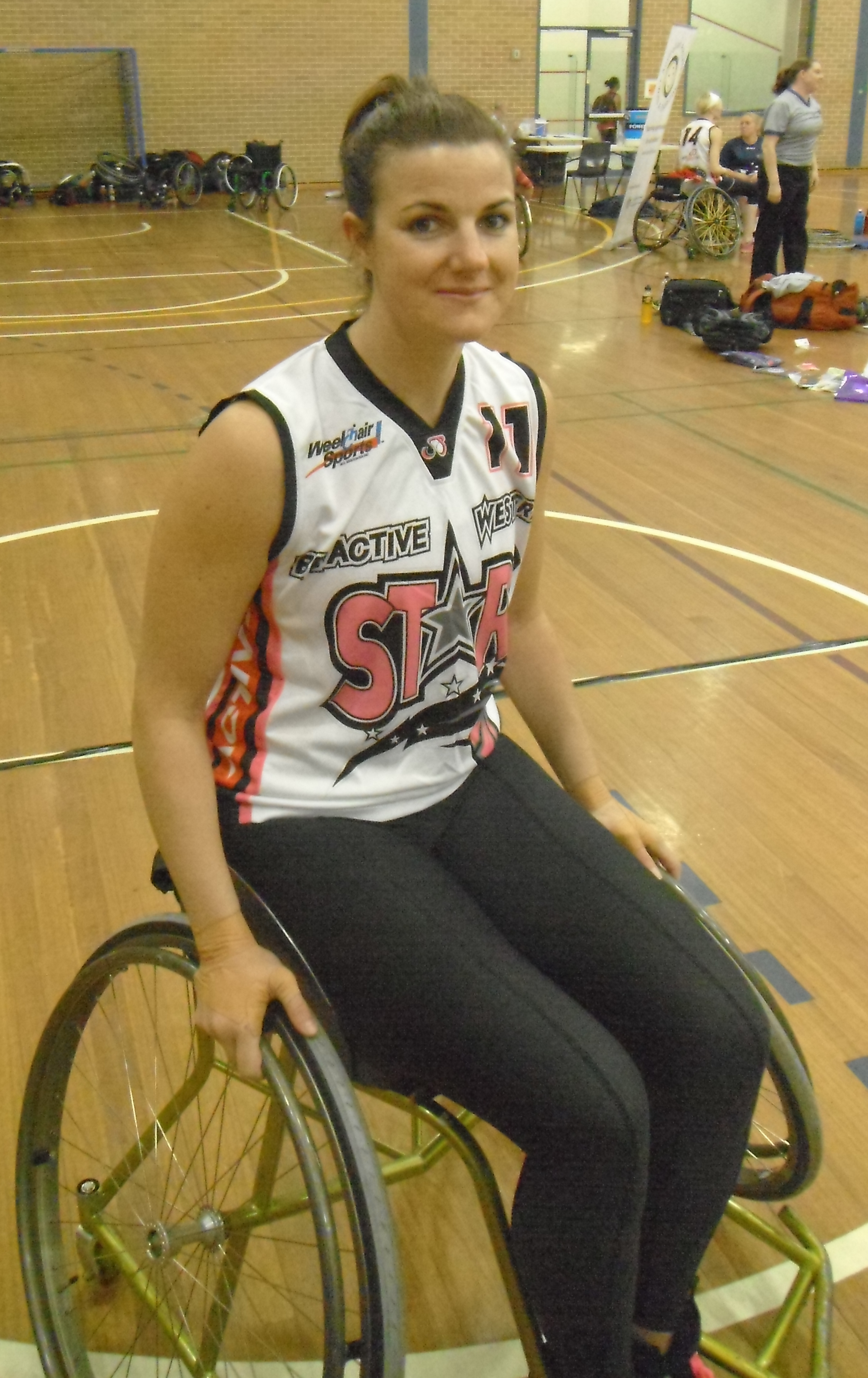
Smith with the Be Active Western Stars in 2013

Smith played wheelchair basketball in the Women's National Wheelchair Basketball League (WNWBL) with the Be Active Western Stars in 2013, and the Red Dust Lady Heelers in 2017. She became the first player to play in both the WNBL and WNWBL, with each WNWBL team being permitted to field a limited number of able-bodied 4.5-point players.

== Personal life ==
Smith's husband, Stephen Black, is a former National Basketball League (NBL) player. The couple have a son.

Smith's younger sister, Jaclyn, played for the Bendigo Spirit.
