= Alexandra Sharp =

Australian basketball player (born 1997)

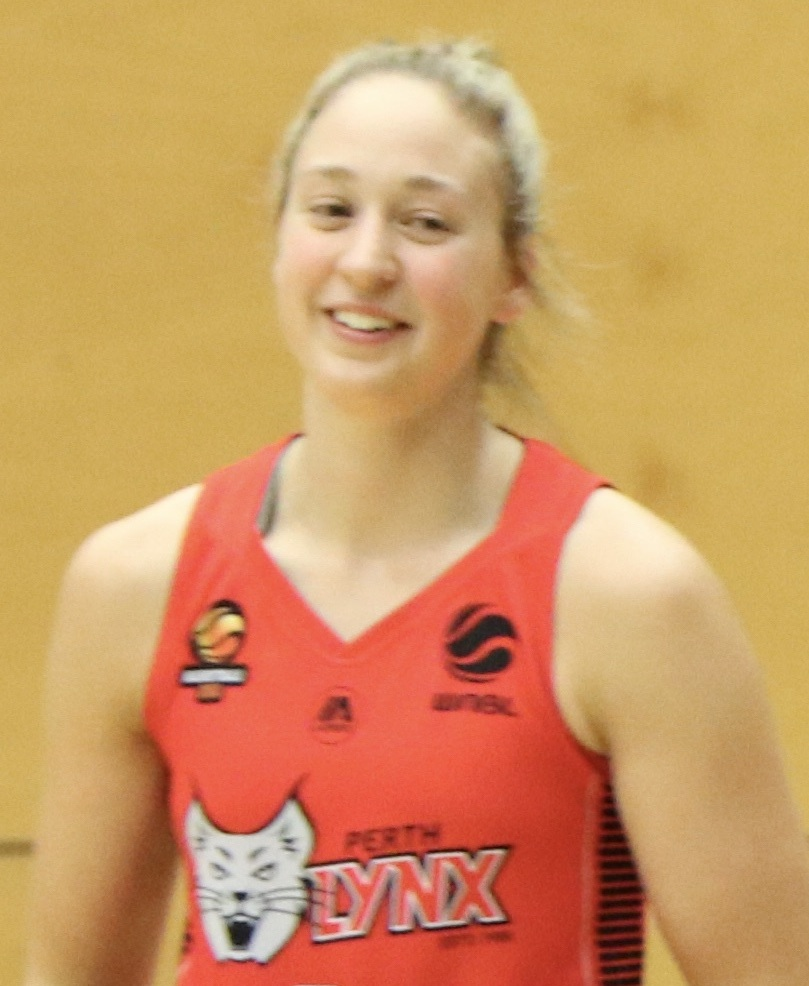
- Sharp with the Perth Lynx in 2021

No. 9 – Geelong Venom
- Position: Guard
- League: WNBL

Personal information
- Born: 4 February 1997 (age 29) Melbourne, Victoria, Australia
- Listed height: 182 cm (6 ft 0 in)

Career information
- High school: Our Lady of Mercy College (Melbourne, Victoria)
- College: Wake Forest (2016–2020)
- WNBA draft: 2020: undrafted
- Playing career: 2014–present

Career history
- 2014–2015: BA Centre of Excellence
- 2016: Diamond Valley Eagles
- 2020–2023: Perth Lynx
- 2021–2023: Willetton Tigers
- 2023–2024: UC Capitals
- 2024–2025: Rockingham Flames
- 2024: CB Estudiantes
- 2024–present: Geelong United/Venom
- 2026: Diamond Valley Eagles

Career highlights
- WNBL Breakout Player of the Year (2024); 2× NBL1 West champion (2021, 2024); 2× NBL1 West Grand Final MVP (2021, 2024); 2× NBL1 West Most Valuable Player (2021, 2023); 2× All-NBL1 West First Team (2021, 2023); NBL1 West All-Defensive Team (2025); NBL1 West leading rebounder (2023); ACC All-Freshman Team (2017)
Medals
Basketball
Representing Australia
FIBA Asia Cup
Bronze medal – third place	2021 Jordan
Summer Universiade
Gold medal – first place	2017 Taiwan	Team
Gold medal – first place	2019 Italy	Team

Alexandra Jane Sharp (born 4 February 1997) is an Australian professional basketball player.

== Early life and career ==
Sharp was born in Melbourne, Victoria, in the suburb of Carlton. She attended Our Lady of Mercy College.

In 2014, Sharp moved to Canberra to attend the Australian Institute of Sport (AIS). She played for the BA Centre of Excellence in the South East Australian Basketball League (SEABL) in 2014 and 2015. In 2016, she played in the Big V for the Diamond Valley Eagles.

== College career ==
Sharp played college basketball in the United States for the Wake Forest Demon Deacons in the Atlantic Coast Conference of the NCAA Division I between 2016 and 2020.

=== Statistics ===
Year	Team	GP	GS	MPG	FG%	3P%	FT%	RPG	APG	SPG	BPG	TO	PPG
2016–17	Wake Forest	32	25	33.4	.337	.345	.712	7.6	2.3	0.6	0.6	3.0	7.4
2017–18	Wake Forest	15	15	35.3	.381	.319	.762	9.3	2.3	0.8	0.4	2.6	12.7
2018–19	Wake Forest	31	31	33.2	.421	.250	.681	8.4	3.0	0.5	0.5	2.8	10.5
2019–20	Wake Forest	32	32	33.3	.420	.402	.800	8.7	1.8	0.8	0.4	2.4	12.3
Career		110	103	33.8	.451	.334	.740	8.3	2.4	0.6	0.5	2.7	10.4

== Professional career ==
=== Perth Lynx and Willetton Tigers (2020–2023) ===
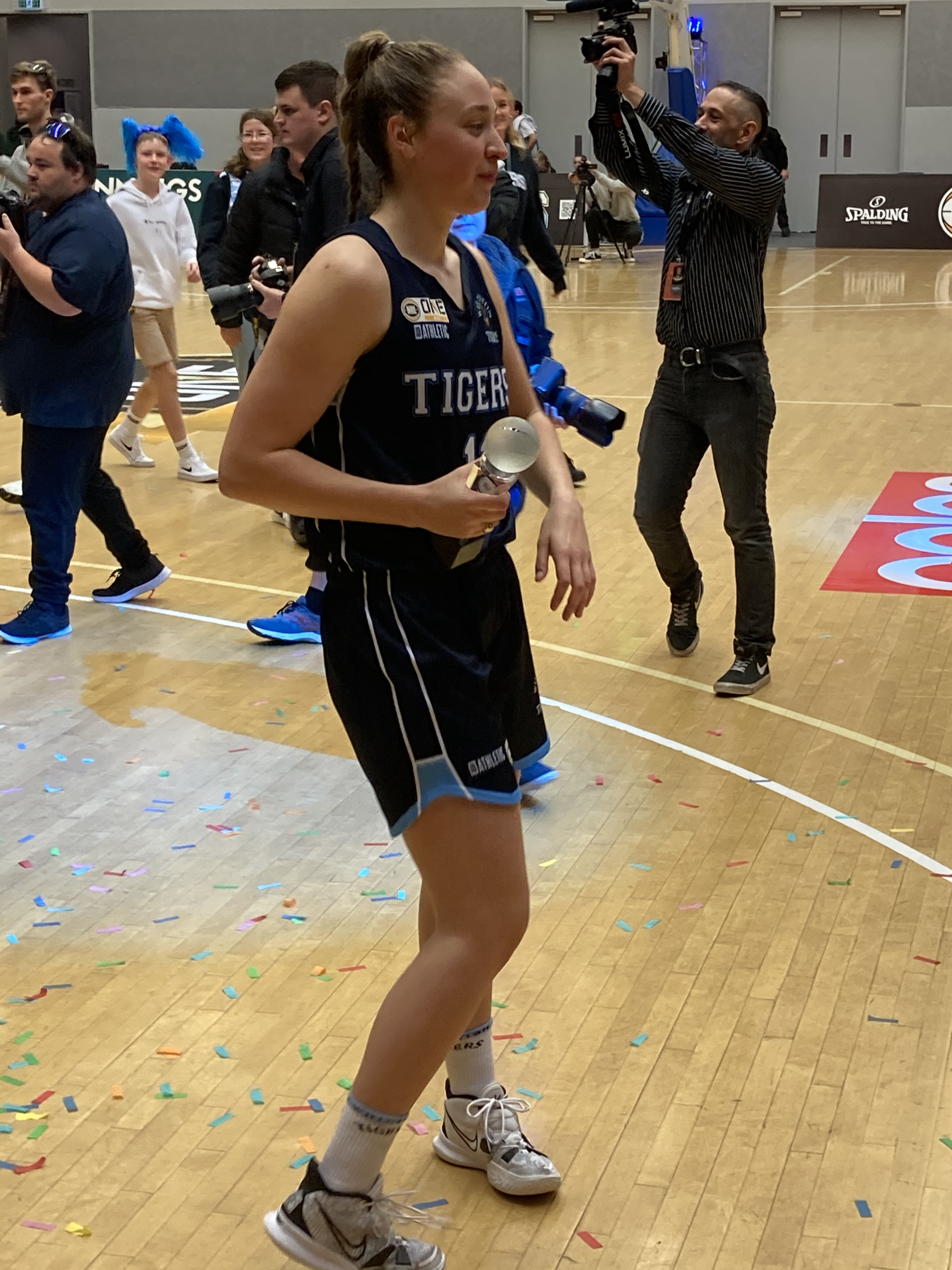
Sharp with the Willetton Tigers in 2021

In July 2020, Sharp signed her first professional contract with the Perth Lynx of the Women's National Basketball League (WNBL). During the 2020 WNBL Hub season in Queensland, she led the team in rebounds with 7.9 per game and was the fourth highest scorer with 8.9 points per game.

Sharp joined the Willetton Tigers of the NBL1 West for the 2021 season. She was named NBL1 West MVP and All-NBL1 West First Team and helped lead the Tigers to the grand final, where they defeated the Joondalup Wolves 65–54 to win the championship. Sharp was named grand final MVP for her 13 points, 15 rebounds and four assists. In 20 games, she averaged 18.95 points, 13.3 rebounds, 5.25 assists and 1.7 steals per game.

Sharp returned to the Lynx for the 2021–22 WNBL season, played a second season with the Tigers in the 2022 NBL1 West season, and then played a third season for the Lynx in 2022–23. With the Tigers in the 2023 NBL1 West season, Sharp was named NBL1 West MVP for the second time in three seasons.

=== UC Capitals, Rockingham Flames and Estudiantes (2023–2024) ===
On 2 June 2023, Sharp signed with the UC Capitals for the 2023–24 WNBL season. She was named WNBL Breakout Player of the Year.

Sharp joined the Rockingham Flames for the 2024 NBL1 West season. She helped the Flames reach the NBL1 West grand final, where she had 19 points, 10 rebounds and six assists in a 97–81 victory over the Cockburn Cougars to win her second NBL1 West championship. She was subsequently named grand final MVP for the second time.

On 2 July 2024, Sharp signed with CB Estudiantes of the Liga Femenina de Baloncesto. She played her final game for Estudiantes on 14 December 2024 after being granted a release from her contract. In 12 league games, she averaged 5.4 points, 4.4 rebounds and 1.4 assists per game.

=== Geelong United/Venom, Rockingham Flames and Diamond Valley Eagles (2024–present) ===
On 18 December 2024, Sharp signed with Geelong United for the rest of the 2024–25 WNBL season.

Sharp re-joined the Flames for the 2025 NBL1 West season. On 25 July 2025, he recorded a triple-double with 12 points, 15 rebounds and 11 assists in an 88–68 win over the Lakeside Lightning. She was named to the NBL1 West All-Defensive Team.

Sharp re-joined Geelong, now known as the Venom, for the 2025–26 WNBL season. She was named co-captain of the Venom.

On 10 March 2026, Sharp signed with the Diamond Valley Eagles of the NBL1 South for the 2026 season, returning to the club for a second stint.

On 31 March 2026, Sharp re-signed with the Geelong Venom for the 2026–27 WNBL season.

== National team career ==
Sharp made her international debut with the Sapphires at the 2013 FIBA Under-16 Oceania Championship in Melbourne where Australia swept New Zealand to take home Gold. Sharp would go on to represent the Sapphires at the FIBA Under-17 World Championship in the Czech Republic the following year.

Sharp then made her debut with the Gems at the 2015 FIBA Under-19 World Championship in Russia, where the Gems took home the bronze.

Sharp was named to represent the Australian Opals at the 2021 FIBA Asia Cup.

In April 2025, Sharp was named in the Opals squad for a trans-Tasman series against New Zealand in May.
