= Greg Hire =

Australian basketball player (born 1987)

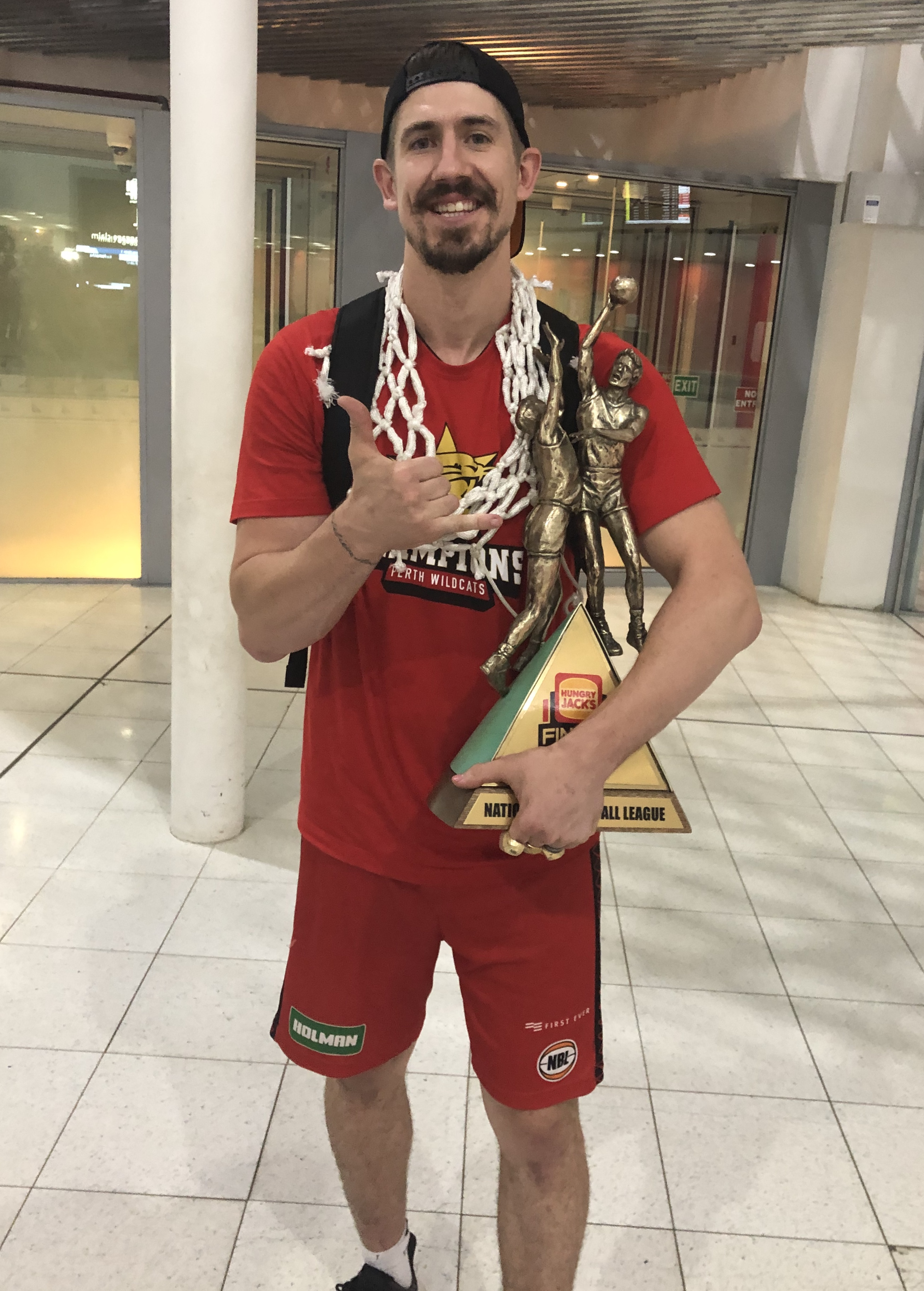
- Hire in March 2019

Personal information
- Born: 19 September 1987 (age 39) Perth, Western Australia, Australia
- Listed height: 201 cm (6 ft 7 in)
- Listed weight: 100 kg (220 lb)

Career information
- High school: Woodvale Senior (Perth, Western Australia)
- College: Miles CC (2006–2008); Augusta (2008–2010)
- NBA draft: 2010: undrafted
- Playing career: 2005–2022
- Position: Small forward / shooting guard

Career history
- 2005–2012: Wanneroo Wolves
- 2010–2019: Perth Wildcats
- 2016: Joondalup Wolves
- 2018–2019; 2021–2022: Rockingham Flames

Career highlights
- 4× NBL champion (2014, 2016, 2017, 2019); 2× SBL / NBL1 West champion (2011, 2022); SBL Grand Final MVP (2011); 2× SBL All-Star Five (2011, 2019); SBL Most Improved Player (2006)

Greg Hire (born 19 September 1987) is an Australian former professional basketball player. He played four years of college basketball in the United States before joining the Perth Wildcats of the National Basketball League (NBL) in 2010 as a development player. In 2011, he was elevated to the full-time roster and in 2014 he won his first NBL championship. He went on to win three more championships in 2016, 2017 and 2019. In the NBL1 West, he won a championship with the Wanneroo Wolves in 2011 and again with the Rockingham Flames in 2022.

== Early life and career ==
Hire was born in Perth, Western Australia, in the suburb of Subiaco. His mother, a Hungarian immigrant, moved to Australia as a refugee and settled in Perth. Hire's parents did not have a healthy relationship and split when he was around 10 years old. He grew up around domestic violence, drugs, alcohol, depression and a lack of positive role models. He eventually turned to basketball. He attended Woodvale Senior High School, where he played basketball and football. He represented Western Australia at both the under-18 and under-20 national championships.

Hire debuted for the Wanneroo Wolves in the State Basketball League (SBL) in 2005. With the Wolves in 2006, he won the SBL Most Improved Player. While in college, he continued to play for the Wolves in the off-seasons in 2007, 2008, 2009 and 2010.

== College career ==
Hire played college basketball in the United States between 2006 and 2010, attending both Miles Community College (2006–08) and Augusta State University (2008–10). He averaged a double-double during both seasons at Miles, including 16.5 points and 10.7 rebounds per game during the 2007–08 season. He was a Mon-Dak all-conference first-team selection in 2006–07 and second-team selection in 2007–08. He was also an all-region first-team pick in both 2006–07 and 2007–08. In his first season at Augusta State, he averaged 5.3 points and 5.1 rebounds in 35 games (34 starts). He helped Augusta State win the Peach Belt Conference regular season championship and the Peach Belt tournament title in 2009. The next year, he led them to the Peach Belt East Division regular season championship as well as the Peach Belt Tournament semi-finals. He was also part of the Augusta State team that advanced to the NCAA Division II Final Four in 2009 and the Elite Eight in 2010.

== Professional career ==
=== Perth Wildcats (2010–2019) ===
Hire joined the Perth Wildcats of the National Basketball League (NBL) as a development player for the 2010–11 season. He impressed in his first season, showing a significant improvement in his fitness, mobility, strength and shooting, and took the floor in 13 games. He subsequently earned the Coach's Award for the 2010–11 season.

Hire was elevated to a fully contracted player with the Wildcats for the 2011–12 season. He turned to four-time NBL champion and dual Olympian Martin Cattalini for guidance and mentorship during his first full-time campaign. After averaging five minutes a game for the season, Hire was considered a "game changer" in game two of the Wildcats' grand final series against the New Zealand Breakers in Perth. He delivered a rousing half-time speech before injecting life into Perth in the third term, recording seven points and four rebounds for the quarter, leading the way as the key figure in the comeback that reduced a deficit that at its worst reached 13 points. He finished the game playing almost 17 minutes in what was a one-point win. The Wildcats went on to lose the championship to the Breakers with a loss in game three.

Hire continued on with the Wildcats for the 2012–13 season and loomed as a key member. During his second full-time season, he was promoted to the team's starting five and the club's leadership group. His season featured improvements in all statistical areas and included his first double-double effort, which he nearly converted into a rare triple-double in game one of the semi-final series against the Wollongong Hawks, when he had 10 points, 10 rebounds and seven assists. He also had a career-high 14 rebounds in February against the Adelaide 36ers. The Wildcats reached the 2013 NBL Grand Final series, where they were defeated 2–0 by the Breakers. Hire averaged 4.9 points, 5.7 rebounds and 1.7 assists per game during the season, with his playing minutes more than doubling from the 2011–12 season.

For the 2013–14 season, Hire was named co-vice captain of the Wildcats alongside Shawn Redhage. In February 2014, he played his 100th NBL game. The Wildcats reached their third straight NBL Grand Final in 2014, with Hire winning his first NBL championship after they defeated the Adelaide 36ers 2–1. Hire was touted as a possible grand final MVP when he came off the bench in the deciding third game and contributed nine rebounds and five assists to inspire the Wildcats to victory.

Hire appeared in the Wildcats' 2014–15 season opener, but then missed the next three months with a tear to his left calf muscle, an injury he sustained at training. He travelled with the team despite being sidelined to provide leadership and support from the bench. During his time off, Hire strived to improve his outside jumper through high-volume shooting sessions and tweaked his diet in order to become more streamlined and versatile on the court. He also dropped roughly 3 kg and lost 25mm of skinfolds. He later missed game two of the Wildcats' semi-final series against the Cairns Taipans with a right calf injury he sustained in game one, a series the Wildcats lost in straight sets. Hire played in a career-low 11 games in 2014–15.

Hire's court time was limited for the Wildcats during the 2015–16 season, but he still managed to play in every game. He moved to a guard/forward role in 2015–16. He had 13 points and 11 rebounds against the Illawarra Hawks on 25 October, and scored a then career-high 14 points against the Cairns Taipans on 25 January. The Wildcats returned to the NBL Grand Final in 2016, where they defeated the Breakers 2–1, with Hire claiming his second title in three years.

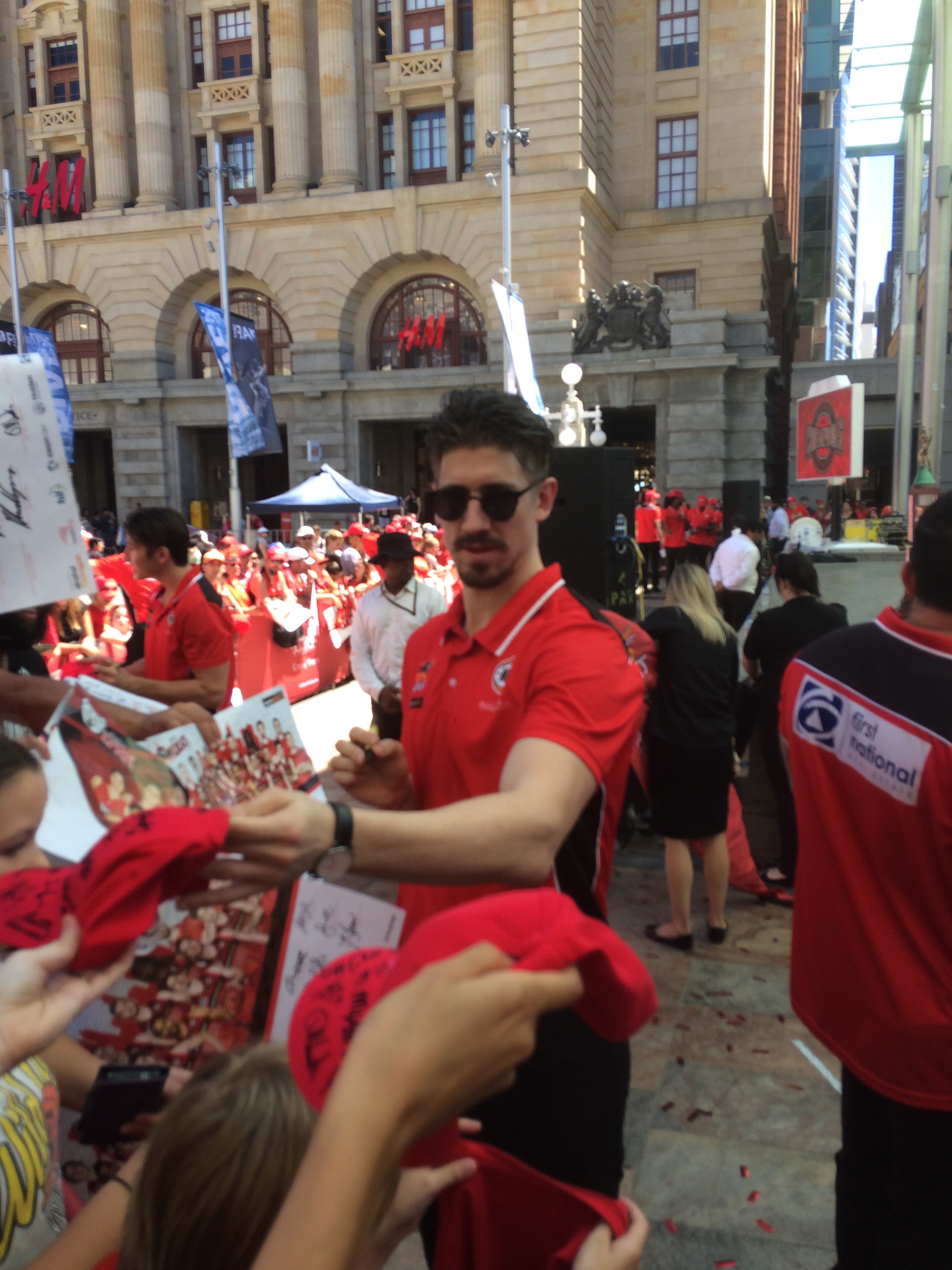
Hire in March 2017, at the Wildcats' championship ceremony. Prior to joining the Rockingham Flames in 2018, Hire was affectionately known by fans of the Wildcats as the 'Mayor of Wanneroo'.

Coming off a disrupted pre-season after dislocating his finger at training, Hire came into the 2016–17 season hungry for a bigger role after averaging just over 12 minutes per game in 2015–16. In February 2017, he scored a career-high 20 points against the Brisbane Bullets. The Wildcats went on to reach the 2017 NBL Grand Final series, where in the best-of-five series, the Wildcats defeated the Illawarra Hawks in three games to claim back-to-back championships, with Hire collecting his third title.

In December of the 2017–18 season, Hire played his 200th game for the Wildcats, becoming the 11th Wildcat to play 200 games for the club, and just the fifth West Australian. He later missed five games with a low grade calf strain. The Wildcats finished the regular season in third place with a 16–12 record, before going on to lose to the Adelaide 36ers in the semi-finals.

Hire returned to the Wildcats in 2018 for one final season, announcing his retirement from the NBL on 6 February 2019, effective at the end of the 2018–19 season. He retired as one of only 16 players in NBL history have won four titles, after the Wildcats defeated Melbourne United 3–1 in the 2019 NBL Grand Final series.

=== SBL / NBL1 West ===
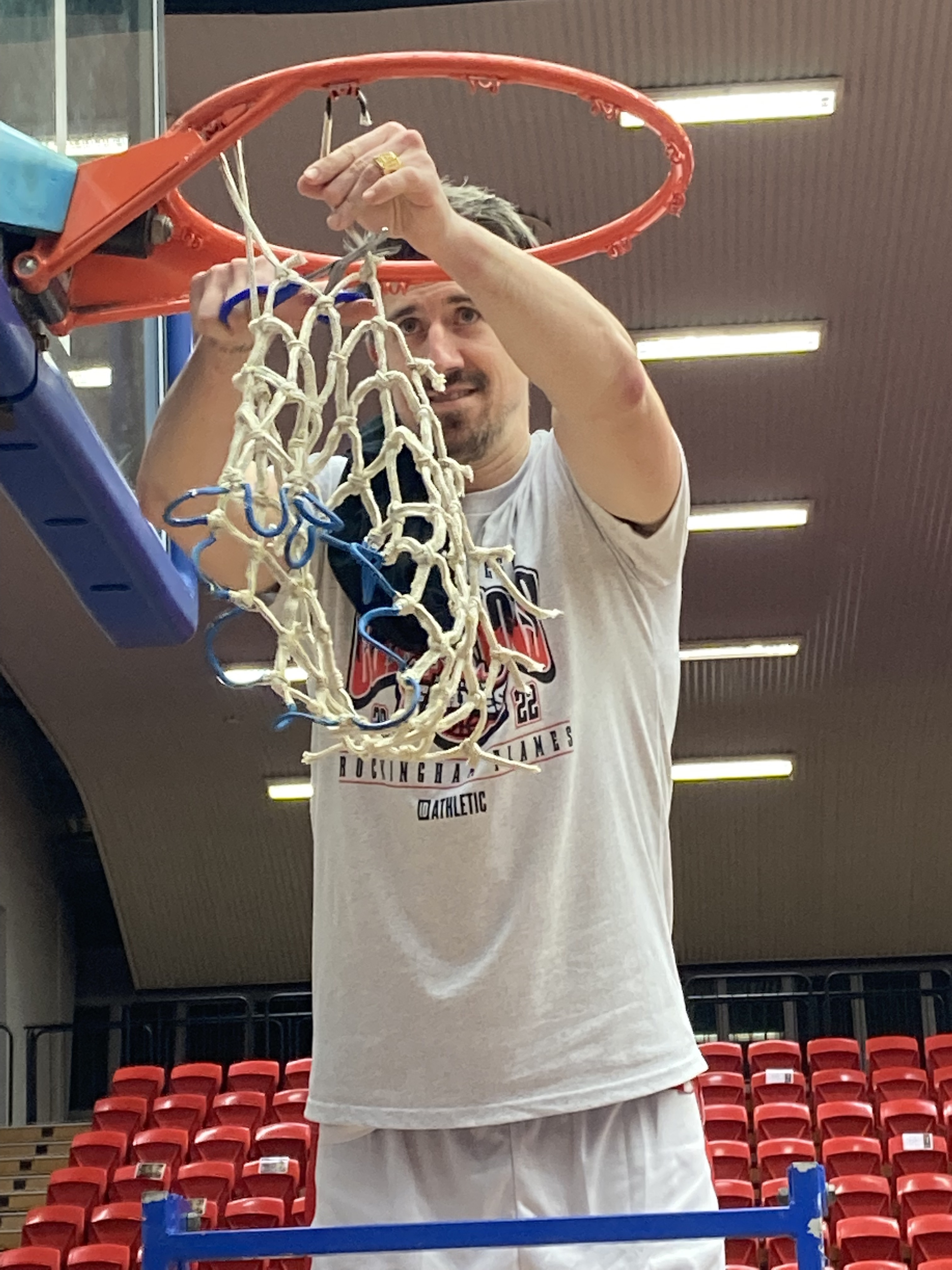
Hire in September 2022 following the NBL1 West Grand Final

In 2011, Hire led the Wanneroo Wolves to the SBL championship after recording 31 points and 28 rebounds in the grand final against the Perry Lakes Hawks, earning Grand Final MVP honours. While playing for the Wolves in 2012, Hire suffered a finger injury.

Hire played for the Joondalup Wolves during the 2016 SBL season, where he reached 150 games for the Wolves.

Hire joined the Rockingham Flames for the 2018 SBL season. In game one of the semi-finals against the Perry Lakes Hawks, Hire recorded 19 points and 20 rebounds in a 92–73 win. The Flames went on to lose the next two games to bow out of the finals, despite Hire scoring a game-high 29 points in a 102–96 loss in game three. In 24 games for the Flames, he averaged 18.54 points, 13.58 rebounds and 5.96 assists per game.

Hire returned to the Flames for the 2019 SBL season, where in the opening game he record a triple-double with 18 points, 11 rebounds and 10 assists against the Cockburn Cougars. In May 2019, he played in the same SBL game alongside former Wildcats teammates and fellow retirees Brad Robbins and Shawn Redhage when the Flames faced the Perry Lakes Hawks. On 8 June 2019, he recorded 20 points, 18 rebounds and 10 assists in the Flames' 108–98 win over the Kalamunda Eastern Suns. He helped the Flames finish the regular season in fourth place with an 18–8 record, and in the finals, they lost 2–0 to the Hawks in the quarter-finals. In 19 games, he averaged 17.47 points, 15.58 rebounds and 5.63 assists per game. For the season, he was named to the SBL All-Star Five.

In December 2019, Hire re-signed with the Flames for the 2020 season. Due to the COVID-19 pandemic, the season was cancelled.

In December 2020, Hire re-signed with the Flames for the 2021 NBL1 West season. In his season debut for the Flames on 15 May, he recorded 14 points and 12 rebounds in an 85–82 loss to the Geraldton Buccaneers. He had 13 rebounds in a game twice during the season and helped the Flames reach the grand final, where they lost to the Perry Lakes Hawks. In 20 games, he averaged 7.2 points, 7.6 rebounds and 2.9 assists per game.

In December 2021, Hire re-signed with the Flames for the 2022 NBL1 West season. The Flames returned to the grand final in 2022, where they defeated the Geraldton Buccaneers 91–79 to win the championship. He had 12 or more rebounds six times including three doubles and averaged 7.5 points, 9.3 rebounds and 2.8 assists in 15 games. Hire did not join the Flames in Melbourne for the NBL1 National Finals, where the team won the national championship.

== National team career ==
In May 2019, Hire played for the Australian men's 3x3 team at the FIBA 3x3 Asia Cup in China, where they won the gold medal. Three years later, he helped Australia win gold again at the 2022 FIBA 3x3 Asia Cup in Singapore. He represented Australia in 3x3 at the 2022 Commonwealth Games in England, where the team won silver.

On 10 March 2025, Hire was appointed an assistant coach of the Australian men's 3x3 team under head coach Adam Forde.

== Personal life ==
On 24 May 2014, Hire married long-time partner Ainsleigh Sanders. Teammate Damian Martin was chosen by the couple as the marriage celebrant, while former Wildcats teammates Cameron Tovey and Brad Robbins were chosen as his groomsmen. Robbins is Hire's brother-in-law, with the pair having both married sisters.

Hire is an ambassador for the Perth-based charity, "Youth Focus". The charity offers mental health support to young people. In December 2014, he started his own charity called "A Stitch in Time". Earlier in the year, Hire won a Pride of Australia medal after saving at least two young lives through his charity work. On 1 June 2018, Hire was named the recipient of the 2018 Western Australian of the Year Youth Award, for his work with A Stitch in Time.
