= Devondrick Walker =

American basketball player (born 1992)

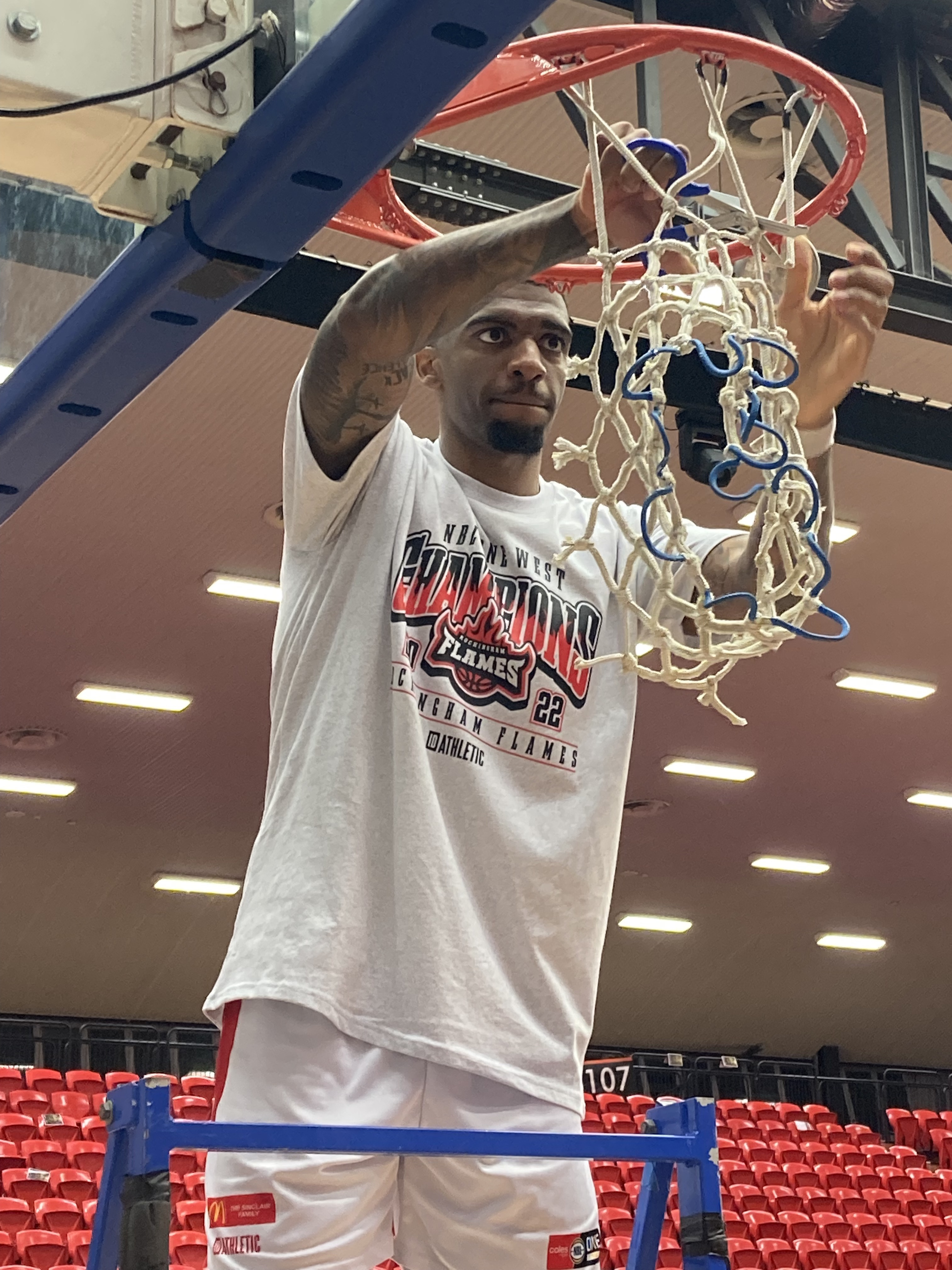
- Walker with the Rockingham Flames in 2022

Mandurah Magic
- Title: Head coach
- League: NBL1 West

Personal information
- Born: July 11, 1992 (age 34) Dallas, Texas, U.S.
- Listed height: 6 ft 4 in (194 cm)
- Listed weight: 209 lb (95 kg)

Career information
- High school: South Garland (Garland, Texas)
- College: NW Oklahoma State (2010–2011); East Texas A&M (2011–2014)
- NBA draft: 2014: undrafted
- Playing career: 2014–2026
- Position: Shooting guard / small forward
- Coaching career: 2025–present

Career history

Playing
- 2014–2015: Austin Spurs
- 2016: Westchester Knicks
- 2016–2017: Delaware 87ers
- 2018: Pallacanestro Trieste
- 2019: New Basket Brindisi
- 2019–2020: Chorale Roanne Basket
- 2020: South East Melbourne Phoenix
- 2021: Hawke's Bay Hawks
- 2021–2022: VEF Rīga
- 2022–2024: Rockingham Flames
- 2022: Brisbane Bullets
- 2024–2025: Borneo Hornbills
- 2026–present: Geraldton Buccaneers

Coaching
- 2025–2026: Perth Lynx (assistant)
- 2027–: Mandurah Magic

Career highlights
- NBL1 West champion (2022); NBL1 West Grand Final MVP (2022); 2× NBL1 West Most Valuable Player (2022, 2023); 2× All-NBL1 West First Team (2022, 2023); NBL1 West scoring champion (2022); NBA D-League Most Improved Player (2017); Second-team All-LSC (2014)

Devondrick Deshawn Walker (born July 11, 1992) is an American basketball coach and former player who is currently the head coach of the Mandurah Magic men's team in the NBL1 West. He played three years of college basketball for the East Texas A&M Lions between 2011 and 2014 before playing the first three seasons of his professional career in the NBA Development League. He later played in Italy, France, Australia, New Zealand, Latvia and Indonesia. In 2022, he led the Rockingham Flames to the NBL1 West championship behind a grand final MVP performance. He was named back-to-back NBL1 West Most Valuable Player in 2022 and 2023. After playing for the Geraldton Buccaneers in 2026, he was appointed head coach of the Mandurah Magic for 2027.

Walker served as an assistant coach with the Perth Lynx of the Women's National Basketball League (WNBL) during the 2025–26 season.

== Early life ==
Walker was born in Dallas, Texas. He attended South Garland High School in Garland, Texas, where he was a three-year letterwinner. As a senior in 2009–10, he averaged 10 points, four rebounds and four assists per game, while being named second-team all-district.

== College career ==
Coming out of high school, Walker had no scholarship offers. Instead, he secured a last-second offer through a connection his high school assistant coach had. In May 2010, Walker signed a National Letter of Intent to play college basketball for Northwestern Oklahoma State University in the 2010–11 season. He rarely played, however, and after one season transferred to Texas A&M University–Commerce.

As a sophomore in 2011–12, Walker saw action in all 27 games with 21 starts, and averaged 28.1 minutes, 8.9 points, 3.9 rebounds, 1.7 assists and 1.0 steals per game. He ranked 10th in the Lone Star Conference in free throw percentage (76.9) and was named the Lone Star Conference Offensive Player of the Week on February 27, 2012. He scored in double digits in 11 contests, including a career-best 24 points in the regular season finale against Angelo State on February 25, 2012. He thrived under head coach Sam Walker.

As a junior in 2012–13, Walker appeared in all 29 games for the Lions with 14 starts. He averaged 9.5 points, 3.2 rebounds, 1.3 assists and 0.9 steals in 24.7 minutes per game. He shot 41.5 percent from the floor, including 41.9 percent from three-point range, while hitting 82.3 percent of his free throws, ranking second in the Lone Star Conference. He posted 13 double figure point totals on the year, highlighted by his 20-point performance against Southern Arkansas on November 26, 2012.

As a senior in 2013–14, Walker was a second-team all-Lone Star Conference selection. He finished the season ranked in the top 10 in the league with 13.6 points per game and led the LSC with a 91.3-percent mark from the foul stripe. He also was named to the academic all-LSC team for the second time in his career, graduating in May. On June 5, 2014, he was named the recipient of the 2013–14 Lone Star Conference Scholar-Athlete Award for A&M-Commerce.

== Professional career ==
=== NBA D-League/G League (2014–2018) ===
==== 2014–15 season ====
Walker had no contract offers coming out of college. After attending open tryouts with the Austin Spurs, Texas Legends and Rio Grande Valley Vipers of the NBA Development League, he joined the Spurs for the 2014–15 season. He helped Austin reach the 2015 Western Conference Finals. In 37 games as a rookie, he averaged 3.0 points and 1.5 rebounds per game.

==== 2015–16 season ====
Walker initially re-joined the Austin Spurs for the 2015–16 season, but he was waived on November 11, 2015, prior to the start of the regular season.

On January 18, 2016, Walker was acquired by the Westchester Knicks. In 25 games, he averaged 4.8 points and 2.2 rebounds per game.

==== 2016–17 season ====
Walker re-joined the Westchester Knicks for the 2016–17 season. He averaged 10 points per game with Westchester to start the season.

On December 14, 2016, Walker was traded to the Delaware 87ers in exchange for Von Wafer. At the D-League Showcase, he scored 46 points over two games on 15-of-18 from the field, including 12-of-12 from 3-point range. Five of his six 20-point games with Delaware came after December, including a career-high 24 points in a 131–125 loss to the Maine Red Claws on February 4. Walker also tallied at least 17 points in 12 games, with 10 of those performances coming after December. Having demonstrated the most significant improvement during the season, Walker was named the 2016–17 NBA D-League Most Improved Player. In his third season, Walker appeared in 48 games (38 with Delaware, 10 with Westchester), averaging 12.0 points, 2.8 rebounds and 1.3 assists.

==== 2017–18 season ====
After playing for the Utah Jazz during the 2017 NBA Summer League, Walker moved to Australia to play for the Perth Wildcats in the 2017–18 NBL season. However, after suffering a fracture in his left foot during preseason, Walker was replaced in the squad by J. P. Tokoto.

Walker returned to the Delaware 87ers in March 2018, but he did not play for the 87ers to finish the 2017–18 NBA G League season. He then played for the Philadelphia 76ers during the 2018 NBA Summer League.

=== Italy and France (2018–2020) ===
On July 31, 2018, Walker signed with Italian team Pallacanestro Trieste for the 2018–19 LBA season. He appeared in four games between October 7 and October 28. On January 9, 2019, he signed with New Basket Brindisi for the rest of the LBA season. In seven games for Brindisi, he averaged 11.4 points and 3.0 rebounds per game.

On December 12, 2019, Walker signed with French team Chorale Roanne Basket of the LNB Pro A. He parted ways with Chorale Roanne on January 13, 2020. He appeared in four games for Roanne, averaging 9.3 points in 23 minutes per game.

=== South East Melbourne Phoenix (2020) ===
On January 14, 2020, Walker signed with the South East Melbourne Phoenix for the rest of the 2019–20 NBL season, returning to Australia for a second stint. In eight games, he averaged 7.38 points and 2.25 rebounds per game.

=== New Zealand (2021) ===
On March 9, 2021, Walker signed with the Hawke's Bay Hawks for the 2021 New Zealand NBL season. He averaged 21 points, 5 rebounds and 3 assists per game.

=== Latvia (2021–2022) ===
On August 22, 2021, Walker signed with VEF Rīga of the Latvian–Estonian Basketball League (LEBL). He parted ways with Rīga on January 24, 2022. In 12 LEBL games, he averaged 12.2 points, 3.9 rebounds and 2.0 assists per game. He also averaged 5.9 points, 1.5 rebounds and 1.6 assists in eight BCL games.

=== Australia and Indonesia (2022–2026) ===
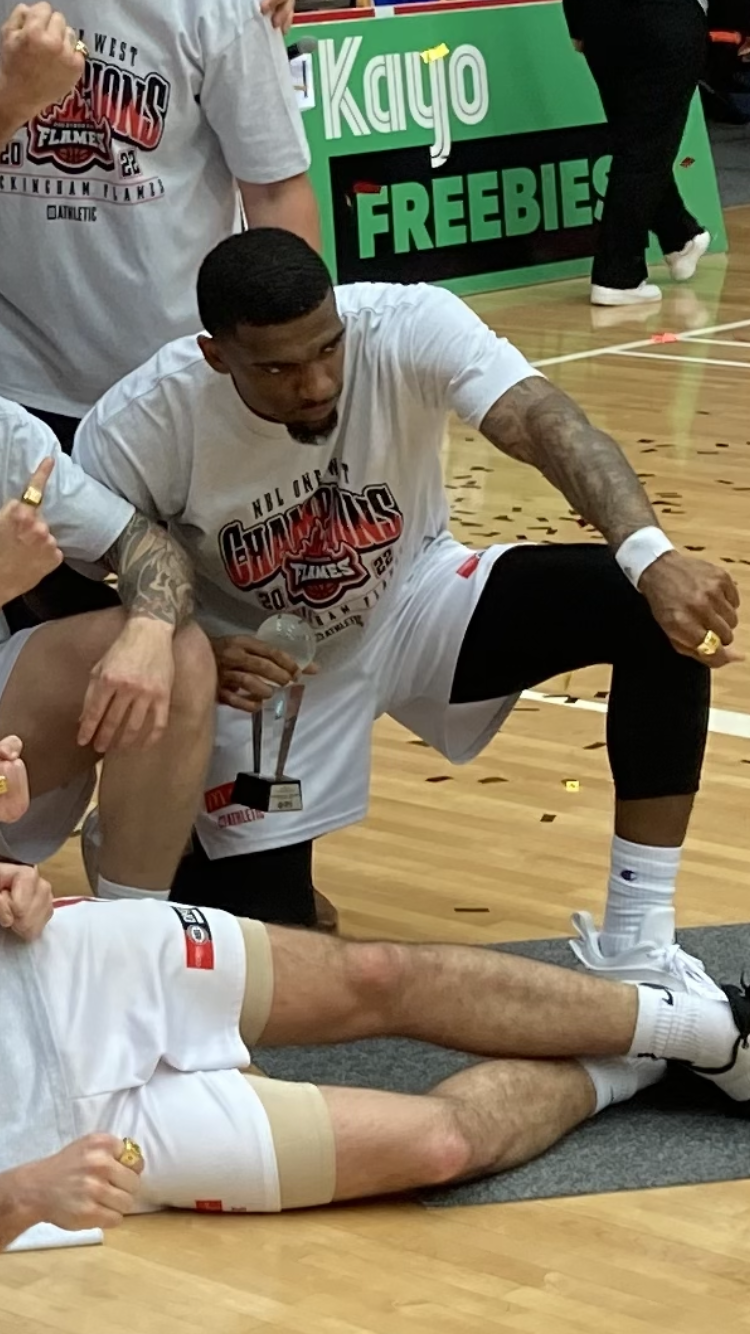
Walker with his championship ring and Grand Final MVP trophy following the 2022 NBL1 West Grand Final

On March 29, 2022, Walker signed with the Rockingham Flames of the NBL1 West for the 2022 season. On May 14, he scored 37 points with seven 3-pointers in an 88–86 loss to the Geraldton Buccaneers. The Flames reached the grand final where they defeated the Buccaneers 91–79 to win the NBL1 West championship. Walker was named grand final MVP for his game-high 26 points. For the season, he was named the NBL1 West West Most Valuable Player alongside All-NBL1 West First Team and the league's scoring title. In 24 games, he averaged 26.96 points, 5.63 rebounds, 3.71 assists and 1.92 steals per game. Walker sat out the 2022 NBL1 National Finals, but the Flames went on to win the NBL1 National championship without him.

On September 5, 2022, Walker signed with the Brisbane Bullets for the 2022–23 NBL season. He was released by the Bullets on November 5, 2022, after averaging 9 points, 1.8 rebounds and 1.4 assists in five games.

On February 7, 2023, Walker re-signed with the Flames for the 2023 NBL1 West season. On May 5, he scored 50 points in a 108–87 win over the Mandurah Magic. He was named NBL1 West MVP for the second straight season. The Flames went on to reach the preliminary final, where they lost 97–94 in overtime to the Joondalup Wolves. Walker recorded 32 points and 11 rebounds in the loss but connected on 4-of-20 from 3-point range. In 24 games, he averaged 27.13 points, 4.46 rebounds, 3.67 assists and 1.17 steals per game. At the 2023 NBL1 National Finals, the Flames reached the championship game where they lost 90–85 to the Knox Raiders despite Walker's game-high 37 points and nine 3-pointers.

In December 2023, Walker signed with the Borneo Hornbills of the Indonesian Basketball League (IBL) for the 2024 season. He was released on February 19, 2024, after appearing in only two games due to injury. He was replaced on the roster by Steve Taylor Jr. He had been recovering from a meniscus injury and then suffered a torn tendon in his thigh.

On February 27, 2024, Walker re-signed with the Flames for the 2024 NBL1 West season. He missed eight straight games during the middle of the season due to injury. The Flames finished seventh in the regular season and beat the sixth-seeded East Perth Eagles in the elimination final, winning 104–81 behind Walker's 38 points. In 14 games, he averaged 21.79 points, 1.93 rebounds, 4.93 assists and 1.36 steals per game.

In December 2024, Walker re-signed with the Borneo Hornbills for the 2025 IBL season. In March 2025, he was replaced by Nate Grimes. In seven games, he averaged 16.0 points, 3.6 rebounds and 3.0 assists per game. He was unable to play in the 2025 NBL1 West season due to injury.

On March 11, 2026, Walker signed with the Geraldton Buccaneers for the 2026 NBL1 West season. He helped the Buccaneers reach the NBL1 West Grand Final, where they lost 66–62 to the Flames despite Walker's team-high 16 points and game-high nine assists along with six rebounds. In 19 games, he averaged 18.11 points, 3.79 rebounds, 3.84 assists and 1.32 steals per game.

Following the 2026 season, Walker announced his retirement from playing.

== Coaching career ==
Walker worked as a volunteer skills coach with the Perth Lynx during the 2023–24 WNBL season.

For the 2025–26 WNBL season, Walker joined the Perth Lynx as an assistant coach. He helped guide the Lynx to the WNBL grand final under head coach and close friend, Ryan Petrik.

On 2 October 2026, Walker was appointed head coach of the Mandurah Magic men's team in the NBL1 West on a three-year deal.

== Personal life ==
Walker is good friends with former teammates Jonathon Simmons and Bryce Cotton. Walker grew up idolising Detroit Pistons' great Isiah Thomas.

Walker and his wife have a daughter.
