= Goldfields Giants =

Basketball team in Western Australia

- Leagues: NBL1 West
- Founded: 1990
- History: Men: Goldfields Giants; 1990–present Women: Goldfields Giants; 2022–present
- Arena: Goldfields Basketball Stadium
- Capacity: 1,200
- Location: Kalgoorlie, Western Australia
- Team colors: Navy blue & gold
- President: Rob Tagliaferri
- Head coach: M: Cal Bruton; W: Jaymi Worthington
- Championships: 2
- Website: NBL1.com.au

Goldfields Giants is an NBL1 West club based in Kalgoorlie, Western Australia. The club fields a team in both the Men's and Women's NBL1 West. The club is owned by the Goldfields Basketball Association (GBA), the major administrative basketball organisation in the region. The Giants play their home games at Goldfields Basketball Stadium.

== Club history ==
=== SBL ===
A men's basketball team known as the Goldfields Giants entered the State Basketball League (SBL) in 1990. The team made their debut at Niels Hansen Basketball Stadium on 9 March 1990, winning 76–70 over the Cockburn Cougars. The Giants' inaugural squad featured American wing Paul Graham, who averaged 43.3 points in 10 games, including scoring 82 points in his final game. It marked the equal highest single-game points total in SBL history. The Giants finished their inaugural season in 12th place with a 7–19 record.

In 1995, the Giants were led by Jeff Williamson. They finished the regular season in third place with a 19–7 record and advanced through to their first ever SBL Grand Final, where they were defeated 2–0 by the Bunbury City Slammers. In the SBL's only best-of-three grand final series, the Giants lost 91–78 in game one. Their bid to square-up the series ended dramatically in game two when Bunbury hit a two-pointer on the final buzzer in a tied game to win 88–86.

In 2004, the Giants set a new franchise-best campaign, as they finished the regular season in second place with a 20–4 record. They went on to advance through to the SBL Grand Final, where they lost 104–97 to the Perry Lakes Hawks. In 2006, the Giants had their best-ever regular season, as they finished in second place with a 21–3 record. They went on to advance through to the SBL Grand Final, where they lost 83–66 to the Lakeside Lightning.

The Giants celebrate their maiden championship in 2007

In 2007, the Giants returned to the SBL Grand Final after finishing the regular season in second place with a 17–7 record. In the grand final, the Giants won their maiden SBL championship with a 96–94 victory over the Lakeside Lightning. Shamus Ballantyne was named grand final MVP for his 18 points, six rebounds and six assists. In 2008, the Giants finished the regular season in third place with a 19–7 record and advanced through to their fourth SBL Grand Final in five years. In the grand final, the Giants defeated the Willetton Tigers 101–82 to claim back-to-back championships. Darnell Dialls was named grand final MVP for his 32 points and 16 rebounds.

In 2017, American forward Jacob Holmen became the first Giants player to be named the SBL Most Valuable Player.

=== NBL1 West ===
In 2021, the SBL was rebranded as NBL1 West.

In August 2021, a Goldfields Giants women's team was approved for entry into the NBL1 West for 2022. The Giants women made the playoffs for the first time in 2026.

== Notable past men's players ==
- (Australia) Atem Kuol Atem
- (United States) Jay Bowie
- (United States) Paul Graham
- (United States) / (Australia) Ty Harrelson
- (Australia) Brent Hobba
- (United States) Jacob Holmen
- (New Zealand) / (Australia) Adrian Majstrovich
- (Australia) Mathiang Muo
- (United States) Donald Whiteside

== Accolades ==
Women

- Championships: Nil
- Grand Final appearances: Nil
- Minor premierships: Nil

Men

- Championships: 2 (2007, 2008)
- Grand Final appearances: 5 (1995, 2004, 2006, 2007, 2008)
- Minor premierships: Nil
