= South West Slammers =

- Leagues: NBL1 West
- Founded: 1989
- History: Men: Souwest Slammers; 1989–1994; Bunbury City Slammers; 1995–2004; Bunbury Slammers; 2005–2008; South West Slammers; 2009–present Women: Souwest Slammers; 1992–1994; Bunbury City Slammers; 2000–2004; Bunbury Slammers; 2005–2008; South West Slammers; 2009–present
- Arena: Eaton Recreation Centre
- Location: Bunbury, Western Australia
- Team colors: Red, blue, white
- Chairman: Sean Tilbrook
- Head coach: M: Xavi Mascaró; W: Jo Lofgren
- Championships: 5
- Retired numbers: 2 (10, 12)
- Website: NBL1.com.au

South West Slammers is an NBL1 West club based in Bunbury, Western Australia. The club fields a team in both the Men's and Women's NBL1 West. The Slammers play their home games at Eaton Recreation Centre and represent Western Australia's South West region.

The club has gone through a number of name changes over the years.

== Club history ==
1989 saw the formation of the State Basketball League (SBL) with both a men's and women's competition. A team from Bunbury, known as the Slammers, entered the Men's SBL for its inaugural season. In 1991, the Slammers made their first MSBL Grand Final, where they lost 123–120 in overtime to the Swan City Mustangs.

In 1992, a Slammers women's team entered the Women's SBL. That year, the men's team recorded their first minor premiership with a first-place finish and a 22–2 record. They went on to reach their second straight MSBL Grand Final, where they lost 107–94 to the Cockburn Cougars.

Following the 1994 season, the Slammers women withdrew from the SBL. They finished in ninth place in each of their first three seasons, registering a 6–14 record in both 1992 and 1993, and a 3–17 record in 1994.

In 1995, the men's team was led by American imports James Fitch and Steve Branch, and coach Steve Hawkins. Halfway through the season, the Slammers had a 6–7 record. They went on to win 12 of their next 13 games to finish in fifth place, and then had series wins in both the quarter-finals and semi-finals. In the 1995 MSBL Grand Final, the league's only best-of-three grand final series, the Slammers defeated the Goldfields Giants 2–0 to claim their first SBL championship, winning 91–78 in game one and 88–86 in game two. Game two ended with a two-pointer on the final buzzer. Both grand final games were held at Challenge Stadium.

In 1996, the men's team recorded their second minor premiership with a first-place finish and a 21–5 record. They went on to reach their fourth MSBL Grand Final, where they won back-to-back championships with a 103–86 victory over the Geraldton Buccaneers.

In 1998, the men's team made their fifth MSBL Grand Final, where they defeated the Cougars 105–96 to win their third championship.

In 1999, the men's team recorded their third minor premiership with a first-place finish and a 21–5 record. They went on to reach their sixth MSBL Grand Final, where they once again claimed back-to-back championships with an 89–73 victory over the Perth Redbacks.

In 2000, the Slammers women returned to the SBL after a five-year hiatus. In the 2012 season, after 15 years of not playing in the finals, the women's team finished in third place with a 15–7 record. They went on to reach the WSBL Grand Final, where they defeated the Rockingham Flames 85–48 to win their maiden championship behind grand final MVP, Kim Sitzmann.

Following the Slammers men's halcyon period in the 1990s, the team had 11 years without making the finals and an overall record of 46–225, which included two winless seasons and two years where they had just one win. The Slammers men returned to the finals in 2013, 2014 and 2015, with 2015 culminating in a 105–75 grand final loss to the Joondalup Wolves.

In 2021, the SBL was rebranded as NBL1 West.

Coming into the 2024 season, the Slammers women had lost 32 straight matches and 73 of their last 74. After going winless in 2024, the team entered the 2025 season on a 52-game losing streak. On 5 April 2025, in the season opener, the Slammers women won their first NBL1 West game since 21 May 2022.

== Accolades ==
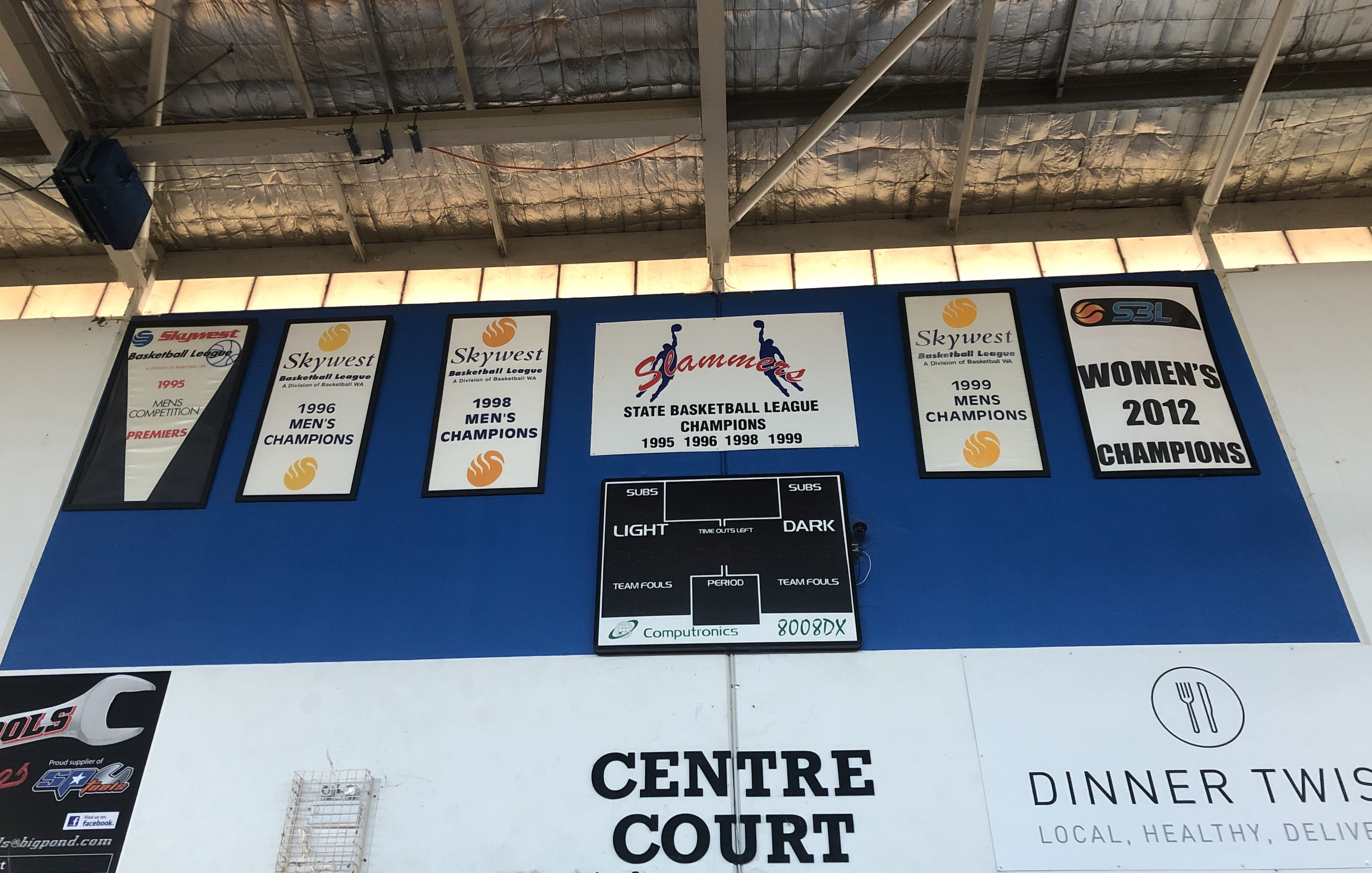
The Slammers' 5 SBL championship banners on display at Eaton Recreation Centre, 2019

Women

- Championships: 1 (2012)
- Grand Final appearances: 1 (2012)
- Minor premierships: Nil

Men

- Championships: 4 (1995, 1996, 1998, 1999)
- Grand Final appearances: 7 (1991, 1992, 1995, 1996, 1998, 1999, 2015)
- Minor premierships: 3 (1992, 1996, 1999)
