= Mandurah Magic =

- Leagues: NBL1 West
- Founded: 1990
- History: Men: Kanyana Kings; 1990–1993; Mandurah Kings; 1994–1995; Mandurah Magic; 1996–present Women: Mandurah Magic; 1996–present
- Arena: Mandurah Aquatic & Recreation Centre
- Location: Mandurah, Western Australia
- Team colors: Red, gold, black
- Chairman: Cliff Kearns
- General manager: Brent Barclay
- Head coach: M: Devondrick Walker; W: Vlad Alava
- Championships: 1
- Website: NBL1.com.au

Mandurah Magic is an NBL1 West club based in Mandurah, Western Australia. The club fields a team in both the Men's and Women's NBL1 West. The club is a division of Mandurah Basketball Association (MBA), the major administrative basketball organisation in the region. The Magic play their home games at Mandurah Aquatic & Recreation Centre.

== Club history ==
=== Background ===
Mandurah Basketball Association (MBA) was established in 1957. In 1983, MBA moved into the Mandurah Aquatic & Recreation Centre following the stadium's completion of four new courts.

=== SBL / NBL1 West ===
The Kanyana Kings men's team was established in Mandurah in 1990, with Don Mihovilovich as the inaugural coach. The Kings finished their inaugural State Basketball League (SBL) season in second place with a 20–6 record. The Kanyana name was dropped in 1994 before a full rebrand to the Mandurah Magic took place in 1996 alongside the inclusion of a women's team.

In 2003, the women's team reached the SBL Grand Final for the first time, where they were defeated 73–44 by the Perry Lakes Hawks. In 2004, the women were crowned minor premiers for the first time after finishing the regular season in first place with a 17–3 record. In 2005, the Magic reached their second SBL Grand Final, where they were defeated 59–54 by the Willetton Tigers. In 2006, they were crowned minor premiers for the second time after finishing the regular season in first place with a team-best 19–3 record. They went on to reach their third SBL Grand Final in four years, where they lost 56–53 to the Lakeside Lightning. In 2009, the Magic reached their fourth SBL Grand Final, where they were defeated 73–63 by the Tigers.

In 2012, the men's team reached the playoffs for the first time since 1999.

Due to renovations to the Mandurah Aquatic & Recreation Centre, the Magic hosted all of their games in 2016 at the Rockingham Flames' home venue of Mike Barnett Sports Complex.

In 2017, the women reached their fifth SBL Grand Final, where they were defeated 59–48 by the Hawks. In 2018, the Magic reached their sixth SBL Grand Final, where they were defeated 75–64 by the Lightning despite leading 64–54 with 5:30 remaining in the game.

In 2021, the SBL was rebranded as NBL1 West. In the inaugural NBL1 West season, the Magic men advanced out of the first round of the playoffs for the first time in club history.

After finishing at the bottom of the ladder in 2023, the Magic men finished the 2024 regular season in fourth place with a 13–9 record behind 34 points per game from league MVP, Joel Murray. They went on to reach their first ever grand final with a 91–88 overtime win over the Joondalup Wolves in the preliminary final. In the grand final, the Magic defeated the Willetton Tigers 91–89 to win their maiden NBL1 West championship. Murray was named grand final MVP for his team-high 30 points.

== Accolades ==
Women

- Championships: Nil
- Grand Final appearances: 6 (2003, 2005, 2006, 2009, 2017, 2018)
- Minor premierships: 2 (2004, 2006)

Men

- Championships: 1 (2024)
- Grand Final appearances: 1 (2024)
- Minor premierships: Nil
