= Perth Redbacks =

- Leagues: NBL1 West
- Founded: 1989
- History: Perth Redbacks; 1989–present
- Arena: Belmont Oasis Leisure Centre
- Location: Belmont, Western Australia
- Team colors: Red, black, white
- CEO: Ben Fraser
- President: Anthony Nixon
- Vice-president: Amien Sym
- Head coach: M: Luke Sunderland; W: Tim Rendulic
- Championships: 6
- Retired numbers: 1 (10)
- Website: NBL1.com.au

Perth Redbacks is an NBL1 West club based in Perth, Western Australia. The club fields a team in both the Men's and Women's NBL1 West. The club is a division of Perth Basketball Association (PBA), the major administrative basketball organisation in Perth's eastern suburbs and across the CBD. The Redbacks play their home games at Belmont Oasis Leisure Centre.

== Club history ==
=== Background ===
Perth Basketball Association (PBA) was established in 1964 as Perth Basketball Club. The club nickname was originally the Demons. Perth's men's team won two titles in the 1960s which was followed by titles in 1972, 1973, 1976 and 1977. The women's team won a premiership in 1975.

=== SBL / NBL1 West ===
1989 saw the formation of the State Basketball League (SBL) with both a men's and women's competition. Perth, trading as the Redbacks, entered a team into both the Men's SBL and Women's SBL. The Redbacks women finished the inaugural season in second place with a 14–7 record and went on to reach the grand final, where they defeated the Perry Lakes Hawks 79–66 to win the championship. The men's team finished the inaugural season in third place with a 17–5 record and also reached the grand final, where they defeated the Geraldton Buccaneers 114–89 to win the championship. Both teams were coached by Don Sheppard, who subsequently won the SBL Coach of the Year Award for both the women's division and men's division. In 1990, the men's team returned to the grand final, where they defended their title with a 114–91 win over the Stirling Senators. Sheppard was named MSBL Coach of the Year for the second straight season. Future NBA player Luc Longley was a member of the Redbacks' back-to-back championship squads. In 1991, the women's team returned to the grand final and lost 79–66 to the Swan City Mustangs.

In 1997, the Redbacks men finished on top of the ladder with a 19–5 record and went on to reach the grand final, where they defeated Buccaneers 94–92 to win their third championship. In 1999, the men's team returned to the grand final and lost 89–73 to the Bunbury City Slammers. In 2000, the women's team finished the regular season in second place with a 15–5 record and went on to reach the grand final, where they defeated the previously unbeaten Perry Lakes Hawks 74–66 to win their second championship. In 2001, the women's team returned to the grand final and lost 74–58 to the Hawks.

In 2017, the men's team finished the regular season in fourth place with a 16–10 record and went to reach the grand final, where they defeated the Joondalup Wolves 103–70 to win their fourth championship. The team featured forwards Shawn Redhage and Lee Roberts.

In 2021, the SBL was rebranded as NBL1 West.

== Accolades ==
Women

- Championships: 2 (1989, 2000)
- Grand Final appearances: 4 (1989, 1991, 2000, 2001)
- Minor premierships: Nil

Men

- Championships: 4 (1989, 1990, 1997, 2017)
- Grand Final appearances: 5 (1989, 1990, 1997, 1999, 2017)
- Minor premierships: 1 (1997)
