= Ashleigh Isenbarger =

Australian basketball player

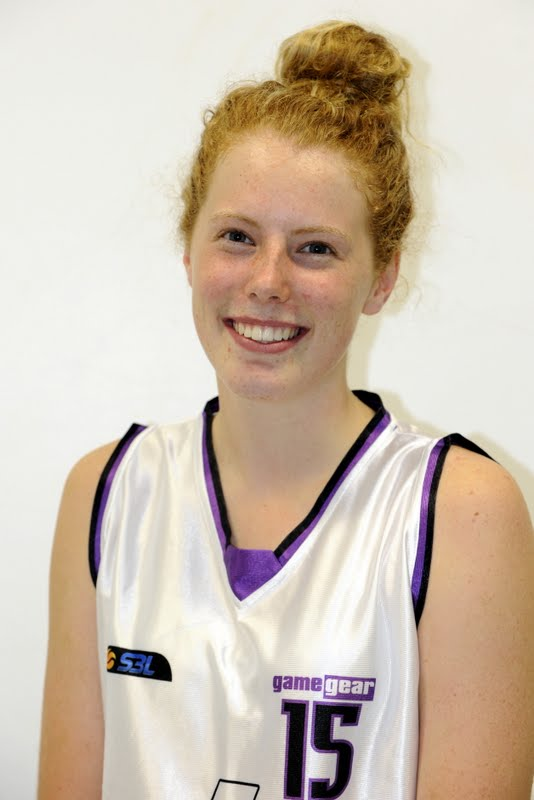
- Isenbarger with the Lakeside Lightning in 2013

Personal information
- Born: 15 May 1997 (age 29)
- Listed height: 188 cm (6 ft 2 in)

Career information
- Playing career: 2012–present
- Position: Forward / Centre

Career history
- 2012–2022: Lakeside Lightning
- 2015–2017: Perth Lynx
- 2017–2019: Melbourne Boomers
- 2020–2022: Perth Lynx
- 2023–2024: Perry Lakes Hawks

Career highlights
- SBL champion (2018); All-NBL1 West Second Team (2024); SBL All-Defensive Five (2018); SBL Most Improved Player (2015)

Ashleigh Isenbarger (née Grant; born 15 May 1997) is an Australian professional basketball player who last played for the Perry Lakes Hawks of the NBL1 West.

== Early life ==
Isenbarger represented Western Australia at the 2015 under-20 national championships, where WA earned a silver medal.

== Basketball career ==
=== SBL / NBL1 West ===
Isenbarger made her debut in the State Basketball League (SBL) for the Lakeside Lightning in 2012. In 2015, she earned SBL Most Improved Player honours. In 2018, she helped the Lightning win the championship while earning SBL All-Defensive Five honours. She played for the Lightning in the West Coast Classic in 2020 and then in the NBL1 West in 2021 and 2022. In August 2022, she played her 200th SBL/NBL1 game.

For the 2023 NBL1 West season, Isenbarger joined the Perry Lakes Hawks. On 12 May 2023, she had a triple-double with 12 points, 12 rebounds and 10 blocks in a 72–44 win over the Lakeside Lightning. She re-joined the Hawks in 2024 and was named to the All-NBL1 West Second Team.

=== WNBL ===
Isenbarger's first stint in the Women's National Basketball League (WNBL) came with the West Coast Waves academy during the 2013–14 season.

For the 2015–16 WNBL season, Isenbarger joined the Perth Lynx as a development player. She was elevated to a contracted player for the 2016–17 season.

For the 2017–18 WNBL season, Isenbarger joined the Melbourne Boomers. She earned the Boomers' Most Improved Player award. She returned to the Boomers for the 2018–19 season.

Isenbarger re-joined the Lynx for the 2020 WNBL Hub season and continued on in the 2021–22 season.

== Personal life ==
Isenbarger's husband, Jack Isenbarger, is also a basketball player and has played in the SBL and NBL1 West.
