= Ben Purser =

Australian basketball player (born 1990)

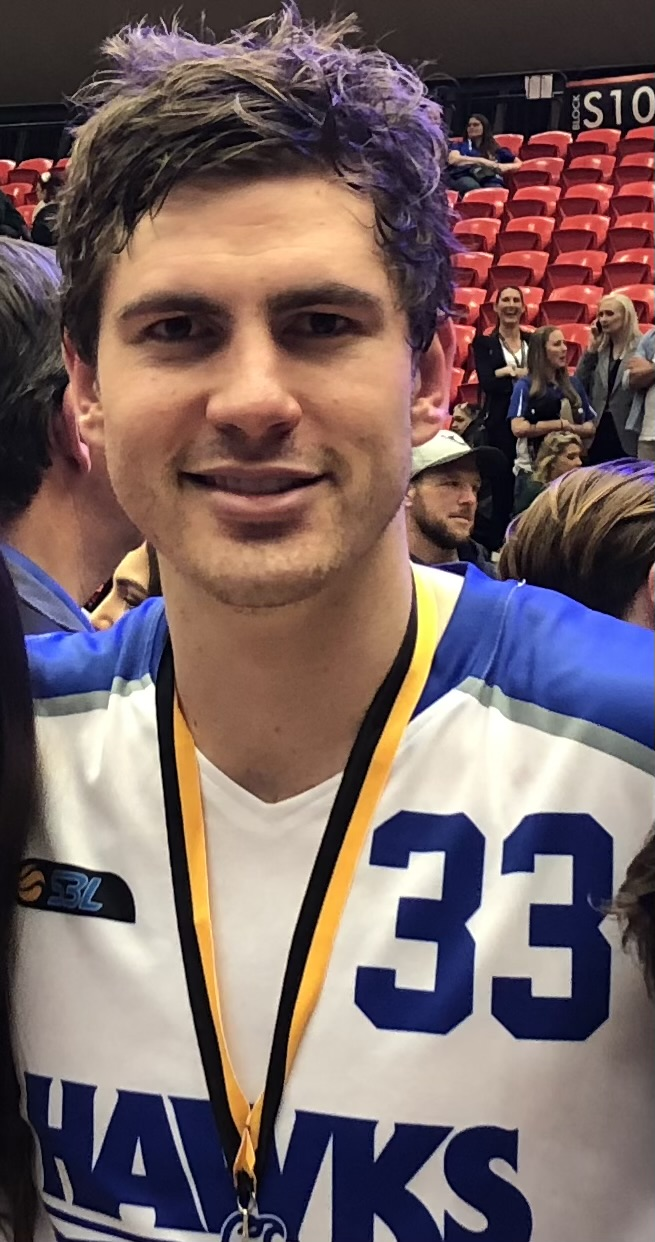
- Purser with the Perry Lakes Hawks in 2018

Personal information
- Born: 24 February 1990 (age 36) Perth, Western Australia, Australia
- Listed height: 6 ft 7 in (2.01 m)
- Listed weight: 207 lb (94 kg)

Career information
- High school: Christ Church Grammar School (Perth, Western Australia)
- College: Augusta (2010–2011)
- Playing career: 2008–2023
- Position: Guard / Forward

Career history
- 2008–2023: Perry Lakes Hawks
- 2011–2013: Perth Wildcats

Career highlights
- 2× SBL / NBL1 West champion (2018, 2021); SBL Grand Final MVP (2018); All-SBL First Team (2018); 4× SBL All-Defensive Five (2016–2019); SBL Most Improved Player (2009)
Medals
Men's basketball
Representing Australia
FIBA Oceania Tournament
Gold medal – first place	2009 Northern Mariana Islands

Benjamin Purser (born 24 February 1990) is an Australian former basketball player. He spent 16 seasons with the Perry Lakes Hawks of the NBL1 West, making his debut in 2008 and playing through until his retirement in 2023. As team captain, he led the Hawks to two championships: the first in 2018 in the State Basketball League (SBL), where he was named grand final MVP, and the second in 2021 during the inaugural NBL1 West season. He earned All-SBL First Team honours in 2018 and was selected to the SBL All-Defensive Five every year from 2016 to 2019. Additionally, he was recognised as the league's Most Improved Player in 2009.

Between 2010 and 2013, Purser played a season of college basketball in the United States for Augusta State University and had a two-year stint with the Perth Wildcats of the National Basketball League (NBL) as a development player. He appeared in 24 NBL games between 2011 and 2013.

== Early life ==
Purser was born in Perth, Western Australia. He attended Christ Church Grammar School, where he played basketball and football and served as school captain.

As a youth, Purser played for the Perry Lakes Hawks in the Western Australian Basketball League (WABL). He also represented Western Australia at multiple junior national championships, winning silver with the Under 18 Metro team in 2007 and bronze with the Under 20 team in 2008.

== Playing career ==
=== SBL / NBL1 West ===
Purser made his debut for the Perry Lakes Hawks in the State Basketball League (SBL) in the 2008 season. The Hawks finished first in the regular season but lost to the Willetton Tigers in the quarter-finals. In game two of the quarter-finals, he scored 21 points. In 28 games, he averaged 8.0 points, 4.8 rebounds and 1.3 assists per game.

In 2009, Purser recorded a triple-double with 17 points, 11 rebounds and 12 assists against the Perth Redbacks on 4 April, and had a season-high 28 points against the Mandurah Magic on 16 May. He helped the Hawks reach the SBL Grand Final, where they were defeated 85–77 by the Lakeside Lightning. He had eight points, two assists, one rebound and one steal in the grand final. For the season, Purser won the SBL Most Improved Player Award. In 28 games, he averaged 13.4 points, 6.2 rebounds and 3.5 assists per game.

In 2010, Purser scored in double figures in all but one game, including a season-high 28 points against the Cockburn Cougars on 20 March. The Hawks were defeated in the quarter-finals by the Geraldton Buccaneers. In 26 games, he averaged 17.8 points, 7.3 rebounds, 5.1 assists and 1.6 steals per game.

In 2011, Purser again scored in double figures in all but one game. On 6 June, he recorded 16 points, 21 rebounds and seven assists in a 94–85 win over the Goldfields Giants. He was subsequently named Player of the Week for Round 12. He later had back-to-back games with 28 points on 10 July and 16 July. The Hawks reached the SBL Grand Final for the second time in three years, where they were defeated 88–83 by the Wanneroo Wolves despite 18 points from Purser. In 22 games, he averaged 18.2 points, 7.4 rebounds, 4.2 assists and 1.0 steals per game.

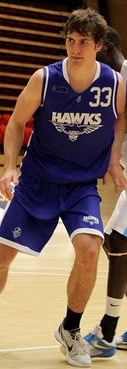
Purser with the Hawks in May 2012

Purser was named team captain for the 2012 season. On 26 May, he scored 32 points in a 95–90 win over the Willetton Tigers. The Hawks missed the finals in 2012 for the first time since 1992, with Purser averaging 17.2 points, 9.0 rebounds, 4.8 assists and 1.6 steals in 19 games.

In 2013, Purser had three games with 30 points of more, including 34 points in a 104–97 win over the Perth Redbacks on 26 July. He helped the Hawks return to the semi-finals, where they lost to the Wanneroo Wolves. In 29 games, he averaged 17.6 points, 7.6 rebounds, 3.4 assists and 1.0 steals per game.

In 2014, Purser recorded a triple-double with 28 points, 13 rebounds and 12 assists in a 138–134 double-overtime win over the Stirling Senators on 23 May. On 21 June, he scored a season-high 31 points against the Joondalup Wolves. He scored in double figures in all but one game as the Hawks missed the finals. He appeared in all 26 games, averaging 20.8 points, 7.9 rebounds and 5.0 assists per game. At the season's end, Purser played for the North All-Stars in the first North v South SBL All-Star game in over a decade.

In 2015, Purser helped the Hawks return to the finals following a successful second half of the season where they won nine of their final 13 games. They lost in the quarter-finals to the Joondalup Wolves. On 4 July, in his 200th SBL game, Purser had 29 points, 14 rebounds, four assists and four steals in a 104–102 overtime win over the Goldfields Giants. He appeared in all 29 games, averaging 18.1 points, 9.4 rebounds and 4.3 assists per game.

In 2016, Purser participated in the SBL All-Star Game and earned SBL All-Defensive Five honours. On 7 May, he scored a season-high 31 points in a 92–91 loss to the Willetton Tigers. In the Hawks' regular-season finale on 29 July, he recorded 24 points and 21 rebounds in a 102–96 win over the Kalamunda Eastern Suns. The Hawks lost in the quarter-finals to the Cockburn Cougars. Purser once again appeared in all 29 games, averaging 15.8 points, 9.0 rebounds, 4.6 assists and 1.0 steals per game.

In 2017, Purser again participated in the SBL All-Star Game and earned SBL All-Defensive Five honours. In the third game of the season, he had a season-high 25 points against the Cockburn Cougars. On 10 June, in his 250th SBL game, Purser scored a team-high 22 points in a 74–69 loss to the Goldfields Giants. The Hawks lost in the quarter-finals to the Willetton Tigers. In 27 games, Purser averaged 14.3 points, 8.0 rebounds and 4.0 assists per game.

In 2018, Purser was named in the All-Defensive Team for the third straight year and earned All-SBL First Team honours for the first time. The Hawks went on a 12-game winning streak to finish in regular season in fourth place. He had a season-high 29 points in game two of the semi-finals against the Rockingham Flames, with the Hawks going on to reach the SBL Grand Final. In the grand final, Purser led the Hawks to a 94–87 victory over the Joondalup Wolves to win his first championship. He was named grand final MVP with 12 points, 10 rebounds and a game-high eight assists in playing all 40 minutes. He appeared in all 33 games, averaging 16.9 points, 8.3 rebounds and 5.6 assists per game.

In 2019, Purser was named in the All-Defensive Team for the fourth straight year and finished fourth in SBL MVP voting. He had a triple-double with 10 points, 10 rebounds and 11 assists against the Mandurah Magic on 5 April, and had a season-high 24 points against the East Perth Eagles on 30 June. In July, he became the all-time leader in games played for Hawks men with 318. The Hawks lost in the semi-finals to the Joondalup Wolves. He appeared in all 30 games, averaging 14.6 points, 7.5 rebounds and 5.6 assists per game.

With a cancelled 2020 SBL season due to the COVID-19 pandemic, Purser played for the Hawks in the West Coast Classic. He helped them reach the grand final, where they lost 96–81 to the Warwick Senators despite Purser's game-high 24 points, nine assists, eight rebounds and two steals. He appeared in all 15 games, averaging 16.0 points, 6.0 rebounds and 4.6 assists per game.

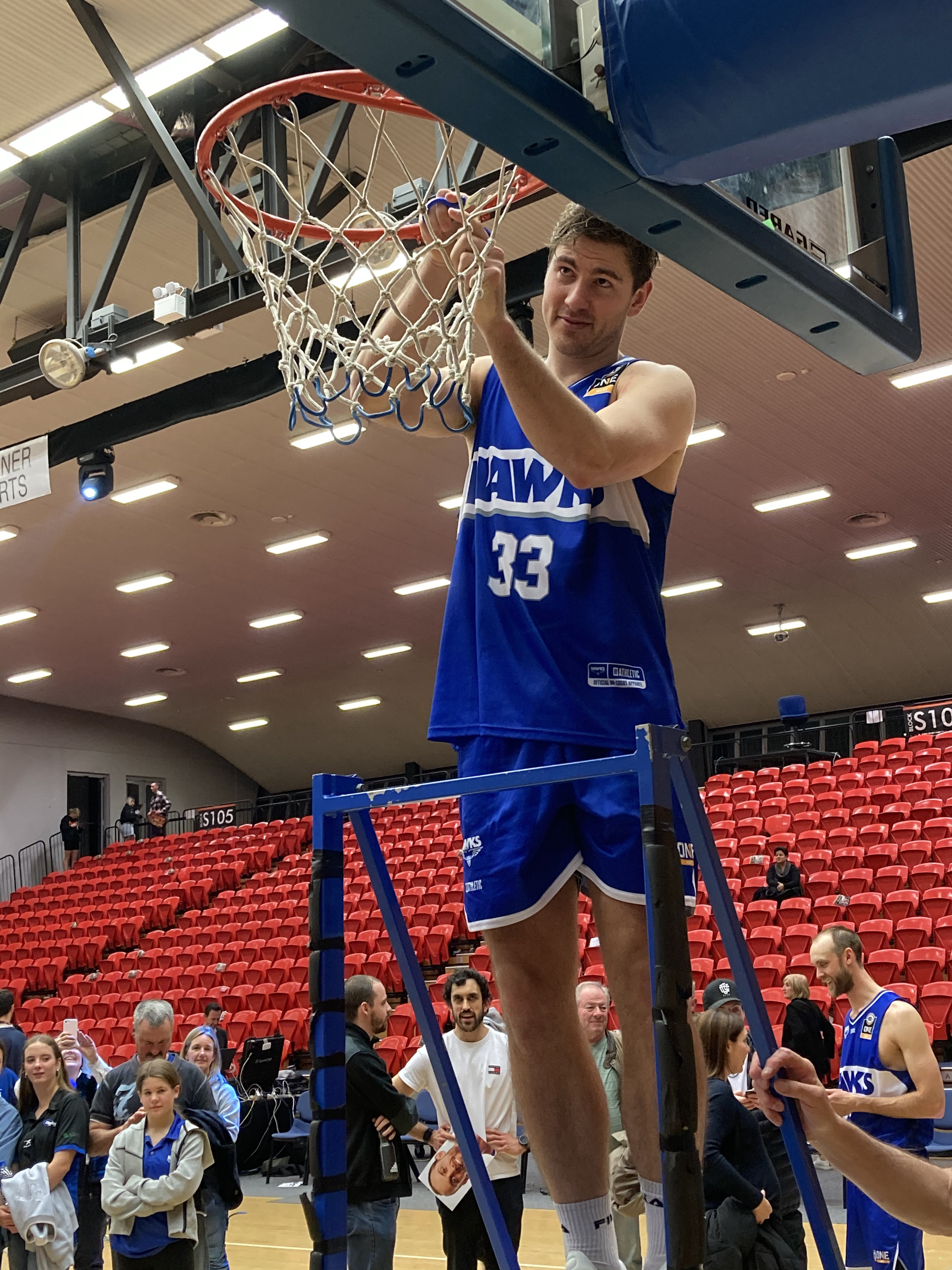
Purser in September 2021, after winning the NBL1 West championship

The SBL was rebranded as NBL1 West for the 2021 season. On 11 June, Purser scored a season-high 21 points against the Lakeside Lightning. He became the Hawks' overall games record holder in July 2021 when he played his 337th SBL/NBL1 game. He helped the Hawks finish the regular season as minor premiers with an 18–4 record. They went undefeated in the first two weekends of the finals to reach the NBL1 West Grand Final. In the grand final, Purser recorded 16 points, four rebounds and four assists in a 92–82 win over the Rockingham Flames to claim his second championship with the Hawks. In 21 games, he averaged 13.3 points, 5.3 rebounds, 5.0 assists and 1.4 steals per game.

In 2022, Purser recorded 23 points and 11 rebounds against the Joondalup Wolves on 22 April in his 350th SBL/NBL1 game. He had another 23-point game against the Wolves on 10 June. In 23 games, he averaged 11.0 points, 6.0 rebounds and 4.9 assists per game.

Purser returned for his 15th SBL/NBL1 season in 2023. It marked his 12th year as captain. He scored a season-high 17 points in the second game of the season on 1 April against the Lakeside Lightning. In 23 games, he averaged 8.7 points, 4.3 rebounds, 3.9 assists and 1.0 steals per game.

In November 2023, Purser announced his retirement from the NBL1 West. In 393 SBL/NBL1 games, he averaged 15.1 points, 7.3 rebounds and 4.3 assists per game.

=== College and NBL ===
In August 2010, Purser moved to the United States to attend Augusta State University and play for the Jaguars men's basketball team in the NCAA Division II. He scored a season-high 21 points on 3 January 2011 against North Georgia. The Jaguars matched a school record with 30 wins in 2010–11, winning the Peach Belt Conference (PBC) championship and the PBC tournament title. They subsequently appeared in the NCAA tournament. In 34 games, Purser made 11 starts and averaged 7.7 points, 3.5 rebounds and 1.5 assists in 20.9 minutes per game.

"He's doing a tremendous job as one of our development players and I think he's definitely an NBL player."

— Wildcats coach Rob Beveridge, March 2012

Purser did not return to Augusta State for a second season, deciding instead to join the Perth Wildcats of the National Basketball League (NBL) as a development player.

In the 2011–12 NBL season, Purser appeared in 10 games for the Wildcats, scoring a total of 20 points. Highlights for Purser included scoring 6 points in 5½ minutes against the New Zealand Breakers on 23 December 2011, and being nominated for the NBL's Round 23 Play of the Week for a three-point play against the Cairns Taipans on 11 March 2012. He was subsequently nominated for the NBL Rookie of the Year Award. The Wildcats reached the NBL Grand Final in 2012, where they lost 2–1 to the Breakers.

In the 2012–13 NBL season, Purser appeared in 14 games for the Wildcats, scoring a total of 11 points. He served as an injury replacement for guard Brad Robbins early in the season. Purser was eligible to be elevated to the senior roster for the NBL Grand Final in place of the injured Damian Martin but the Wildcats opted for Robbins coming out of retirement instead. The Wildcats went on to lose the grand final series 2–0 to the Breakers.

Purser was with the Wildcats squad during the pre-season leading up to the 2013–14 NBL season.

=== National team ===
In June 2009, Purser represented Australia at the FIBA Oceania Basketball Tournament in Saipan. The team went undefeated in the round robin and finals, going 6–0 to win the gold medal. A highlight for Purser was recording 13 points, 10 rebounds and six assists in a 107–41 win over CNMI on day 3.

=== 3x3 ===
In April 2018, Purser played in the NBL 3x3 Pro Hustle and helped his team reach the final of the tournament.

== Personal life ==
Purser's father, Andrew, is a former Australian rules footballer who played in the Victorian Football League (VFL) for the Footscray Football Club from 1983 to 1987.

As of November 2023, Purser and his wife were expecting their first child in January 2024.

Purser studied law and commerce at the University of Western Australia. He was admitted as a lawyer in 2015 and was made an associate in 2018.
