= Daniel Alexander (basketball) =

New Zealand basketball player

Personal information
- Born: July 18, 1991 (age 35)
- Listed height: 206 cm (6 ft 9 in)
- Listed weight: 98 kg (216 lb)

Career information
- High school: Dripping Springs (Dripping Springs, Texas)
- College: Texas A&M (2011–2012); Grand Canyon (2013–2015)
- NBA draft: 2015: undrafted
- Playing career: 2016–2023
- Position: Power forward

Career history
- 2016: Lakeside Lightning
- 2016–2017: Northern Arizona Suns
- 2017: Mount Gambier Pioneers
- 2017–2018: Austin Spurs
- 2018: Lakeside Lightning
- 2018: BC Luleå
- 2023: Perry Lakes Hawks

Career highlights
- NBA G League champion (2018); SEABL champion (2017); All-SEABL First Team (2017); 2× All-SBL First Team (2016, 2018); SBL scoring champion (2018); WAC All-Newcomer Team (2014)

Daniel Alexander (born July 18, 1991) is an American former professional basketball player. He played college basketball for Texas A&M and Grand Canyon before splitting his first three years as a professional in Australia and the NBA G League. He won a SEABL championship with the Mount Gambier Pioneers in 2017 and an NBA G League championship with the Austin Spurs in 2018.

== Early life ==
Alexander was homeschooled growing up until middle school. While living in Washington, D.C., as a third grader, Alexander was inspired to play basketball after attending a Harlem Globetrotters game. He was a sneakerhead growing up and had numerous jerseys of his favorite NBA players. Prior to reaching high school, he was a regular in adult pickup games around Austin, Texas.

== High school career ==
Alexander attended Dripping Springs High School in Dripping Springs, Texas. A member of the varsity from his freshman year, Alexander helped the team steadily improve each of his first three years. As a junior in 2008–09, he earned district MVP honors after averaging 19.6 points and 12 rebounds per game.

In the off-season between his junior and senior years, Alexander was the No. 89-ranked prospect in the country by Rivals.com and was featured on the cover of ESPN Rise. He also attended the LeBron James Skills Academy and the Vince Carter Skills Academy. He subsequently signed a National Letter of Intent to play college basketball for Texas A&M University in November 2009. At the time, he was considered "a guard in a forward's body" due to his ball handling and passing capabilities.

As a senior in 2009–10, Alexander was named First-Team All-District and led the team to the regional semifinals. He was also nominated for the McDonald's All-American Game.

== College career ==
=== Texas A&M ===
Alexander joined the Texas A&M Aggies for the 2010–11 season but was redshirted. He would go on to endure four coaching changes over four years, which he revealed soured his college experience.

Alexander made his debut for the Aggies in the 2011–12 season, going on to play in 28 games with four starts and averaging 2.4 points and 2.3 rebounds in 11.0 minutes per game. He then played in one game to begin the 2012–13 season before deciding to transfer to Grand Canyon University.

=== Grand Canyon ===
Due to NCAA transfer regulations, Alexander was unable to debut for the Grand Canyon Antelopes until December 2013. Despite missing half of the 2013–14 season, he led the team with 58 3-pointers and 34 blocks and he was named to the WAC All-Newcomer Team. In 22 games, he made 21 starts and averaged 12.7 points, 5.6 rebounds, 2.9 assists and 1.5 blocks in 33.0 minutes per game. He scored a career-high 22 points on February 22 against Idaho.

Alexander was a consistent starter for the Antelopes upon becoming eligible until roughly a month into the 2014–15 season when he had to adjust to the role of sixth man. In 29 games, he made seven starts and averaged 9.0 points, 4.9 rebounds and 1.2 assists per game. He scored a season-high 19 points on January 29 against Kansas City.

After graduating from Grand Canyon with a Film degree, Alexander initially did not plan on playing professional basketball but due to the connections he made while travelling with Athletes in Action, he received his first opportunity.

== Professional career ==
=== Lakeside Lightning (2016) ===
Alexander began his professional career in Australia in 2016 with the Lakeside Lightning of the State Basketball League (SBL). He scored 30 points or more 13 times, including a 41-point game on May 27 against the Joondalup Wolves and a 43-point game on July 22 against the Willetton Tigers. He had 17 double-doubles, including a game with 38 points and 20 rebounds on June 25 against the Mandurah Magic. He also had one triple-double with 35 points, 18 rebounds and 10 assists on July 9 against the Perth Redbacks. The Lightning missed the playoffs after finishing 11th with a 7–19 record. Alexander appeared in all 26 games, averaging 27.9 points, 12.8 rebounds, 3.1 assists and 1.7 blocks per game. He was subsequently named in the SBL All-Star Five.

=== Northern Arizona Suns (2016–2017) ===
In October 2016, Alexander joined the Northern Arizona Suns of the NBA Development League after a successful tryout. He played in 15 games with four starts during the 2016–17 season before being waived by the Suns on February 5, 2017. He averaged 3.7 points and 2.7 rebounds in 12.8 minutes per game.

=== Mount Gambier Pioneers (2017) ===
Alexander returned to Australia in 2017 to play for the Mount Gambier Pioneers of the South East Australian Basketball League (SEABL). He led the team with 18.5 points, 9.8 rebounds and 2.4 assists per game, shooting at 55% as well as 83% from the free-throw line for the season. He helped the team finish with a 21–3 record and win the SEABL championship. He averaged 13.3 points and 13.3 rebounds in the playoffs. In the grand final, he had 15 points and a game-high 16 rebounds. He was named player of the week for round 16 and earned All-SEABL First Team honors. He was also named the Pioneers' Team MVP.

=== Austin Spurs (2017–2018) ===
In October 2017, Alexander joined the Austin Spurs of the NBA G League after a successful tryout. He played in 28 games during the 2017–18 regular season, averaging 3.1 points and 1.8 rebounds in 8.1 minutes per game. He played in two games during the Spurs' playoff run as the team won the NBA G League championship.

=== Lakeside Lightning (2018) ===
Alexander returned to Australia for a third time in 2018, re-joining the Lakeside Lightning in the SBL. He scored 30 points or more seven times, including a 40-point game on June 9 against the Kalamunda Eastern Suns and a 43-point game on June 15 against the Cockburn Cougars. His league-leading 27.24 points per game in the regular season saw him earn the scoring title. The Lightning finished with a 15–11 record and lost in the quarter-finals. In 20 games, he averaged 26.9 points, 8.1 rebounds and 5.0 assists per game. He was subsequently named in the All-SBL First Team.

=== BC Luleå (2018) ===
On July 27, 2018, Alexander signed with BC Luleå of the Swedish Basketligan for the 2018–19 season. On November 5, 2018, he was ruled out for the rest of the season with a knee injury. He suffered a torn ACL and meniscus as well as cartilage damage. He averaged 12.4 points, 6.1 rebounds and 1.7 assists in nine league games. He also appeared in two FIBA Europe Cup games.

=== Southland Sharks (2021) ===
On January 15, 2021, Alexander signed with the Southland Sharks for the 2021 New Zealand NBL season. However, he was replaced on the roster on April 3, 2021, after advising the team he was unable to travel to New Zealand due to family circumstances.

=== Perry Lakes Hawks (2023) ===
On January 27, 2023, Alexander signed with the Perry Lakes Hawks in Australia for the 2023 NBL1 West season. In 24 games, he averaged 18.96 points, 7.04 rebounds and 2.83 assists per game.

== Personal life ==
Alexander is the son of Dan and Lyn. He is the grandson of Clarence R. Autery, a highly decorated two-star Major General who served 30 years in the United States Air Force.

Alexander is a devout Christian. After graduating college, he took a youth pastor position at his childhood church.
