= Jalen Billups =

American basketball player (born 1992)

Personal information
- Born: December 21, 1992 (age 33)
- Listed height: 200 cm (6 ft 7 in)
- Listed weight: 109 kg (240 lb)

Career information
- High school: Shroder (Cincinnati, Ohio)
- College: Northern Kentucky (2011–2016)
- NBA draft: 2016: undrafted
- Playing career: 2017–2022
- Position: Power forward / center

Career history
- 2017: Cockburn Cougars
- 2017: Glasgow Rocks
- 2018: Joondalup Wolves
- 2019: Southern Huskies
- 2021–2022: Toyoda Gosei Scorpions

Career highlights
- SBL MVP (2018); All-SBL First Team (2018); Second-team All-A-Sun (2015)

Jalen Christopher Billups (born December 21, 1992) is an American former professional basketball player. He played five years of college basketball for Northern Kentucky before starting his professional career in Australia with the Cockburn Cougars of the State Basketball League (SBL) in 2017. After a short stint in Scotland with the Glasgow Rocks, he returned to the SBL in 2018 and won the league's MVP with the Joondalup Wolves. He joined the Southern Huskies in 2019 for their inaugural season in the New Zealand NBL and then moved to Japan in 2021 to play for the Toyoda Gosei Scorpions of the Japanese B.League.

== Early life ==
Hailing from Cincinnati, Ohio, Billups attended Shroder High School, where he graduated in 2011. He averaged 19.2 points and 8.6 rebounds as a senior and was named to the all-city team and earned All-Cincinnati Metro Atlantic Conference accolades.

== College career ==
As a freshman with the Northern Kentucky Norse in 2011–12 in the NCAA Division II, Billups played 25 games with five starts and averaged 5.0 points per game. He scored a season-high 16 points against Lane College on November 18, 2011.

For the 2012–13 season, the Norse entered the NCAA Division I. Billups started seven games to begin the season before missing the final 19 games due to a medical condition. In December 2012, just days after Christmas, he collapsed during practice. He was diagnosed with an arrhythmia, caused by problems with the system that regulates a steady heartbeat, and subsequently had a defibrillator placed inside his body in September 2013. The season was classified as a medical redshirt year for Billups, which deemed him eligible for three more years upon being cleared to return to play.

In the 2013–14 season, Billups saw action in all 30 games with 25 starts. He was third on the team in scoring (9.6 ppg) and first in rebounding (5.2 rpg). He scored a career-high 25 points in NKU's 91–86 overtime win over Tulane on November 24, 2013.

As a junior in 2014–15, Billups played 30 games with four starts and averaged 11.1 points, 5.9 rebounds and 1.2 blocks per game. He subsequently earned second-team All-A-Sun honors.

As a senior in 2015–16, Billups led NKU in scoring at 12.2 points per game to go with 5.5 rebounds. He recorded five 20-point outings during the season, including a season-high 22 points in a win against Oakland on January 19, 2016. He again played in 30 games and started 29 of them.

Billups graduated 20th all-time in scoring with 1,185 points and 11th in rebounds with 599. His 62.0 percent career shooting was second-best all time in 2016.

== Professional career ==
Billups moved to Australia in early 2017 to play for the Cockburn Cougars of the State Basketball League (SBL). He recorded season highs of 40 points and 16 rebounds on May 6 against the Willetton Tigers. He was named SBL Player of the Week four times and helped the Cougars finish the regular season in seventh place with a 15–11 record. They went on to lose 2–1 to the Joondalup Wolves in the quarter-finals. In 29 games during the 2017 SBL season, he averaged 23.83 points, 9.76 rebounds and 1.59 assists per game.

On August 24, 2017, Billups signed with the Glasgow Rocks of the British Basketball League (BBL) for the 2017–18 season. He was named in the BBL All-Star Five for week four. He played 12 games for the Rocks between October 1 and December 3, averaging 15.3 points, 4.4 rebounds and 1.3 assist per game.

On January 15, 2018, Billups signed with the Joondalup Wolves for the 2018 SBL season. He scored a season-high 34 points on July 14 against the Lakeside Lightning. He was named SBL Player of the Week two times and helped the Wolves finish the regular season in second place with a 21–5 record. They went on to reach the SBL Grand Final after going undefeated over the first two rounds of the finals. In the grand final, the Wolves lost 94–87 to the Perry Lakes Hawks despite Billups' 22 points and 13 rebounds, with foul trouble limiting him to 24 minutes. For the season, he was named the SBL MVP and earned All-SBL First Team honors. In 31 games, he averaged 23.87 points, 8.16 rebounds and 1.48 assists per game.

Following the SBL season, Billups trialled with the Maine Red Claws of the NBA G League. He was then set to play for Kinmen Kaoliang Liquor in the Taiwanese Super Basketball League during the 2018–19 season before a leg injury cut short his stint.

On December 10, 2018, Billups signed with the Southern Huskies for their inaugural season in the New Zealand NBL. In their third game of the 2019 season on April 21, he recorded 32 points and 15 rebounds against the Hawke's Bay Hawks. He was subsequently named NZNBL Player of the Week for round two and over the course of the season earned three Team of the Week honors. The Huskies missed the finals with a fifth-place finish and a 9–9 record. In 18 games, he averaged 21.1 points, 7.9 rebounds and 1.1 assists per game.

On February 14, 2020, Billups signed with the Ballarat Miners of the NBL1 South. He was unable to debut for the Miners following the cancellation of the 2020 NBL1 season due to the COVID-19 pandemic.

On August 30, 2021, Billups signed with the Toyoda Gosei Scorpions of the Japanese B.League third division. He had three 40-point games throughout the 2021–22 season, including 46 points on January 22, 2022, against the Yamaguchi Patriots. The Scorpions finished the season in 13th place with a 9–39 record. In 48 games, he averaged 20.9 points, 9.1 rebounds, 1.9 assists and 1.0 blocks per game.
