= 2018 State Basketball League season =

- League: State Basketball League
- Sport: Basketball
- Duration: 16 March – 28 July (Regular season); 3 August – 1 September (Finals)
- Games: 26 (men); 22 (women)
- Teams: 14 (men); 12 (women)

Regular season
- Minor premiers: M: Geraldton Buccaneers; W: Lakeside Lightning
- Season MVP: M: Jalen Billups (Wolves); W: Alison Schwagmeyer (Lightning)
- Top scorer: M: Daniel Alexander (Lightning); W: Anita Brown (Magic)

Finals
- Champions: M: Perry Lakes Hawks; W: Lakeside Lightning
- Runners-up: M: Joondalup Wolves; W: Mandurah Magic
- Grand Final MVP: M: Ben Purser (Hawks); W: Alison Schwagmeyer (Lightning)

SBL seasons
- ← 2017 2019 →

The 2018 State Basketball League season was the 30th season of the State Basketball League (SBL). The regular season began on Friday 16 March and ended on Saturday 28 July. The finals began on Friday 3 August and concluded with the women's grand final on Friday 31 August and the men's grand final on Saturday 1 September.

== Pre-season ==
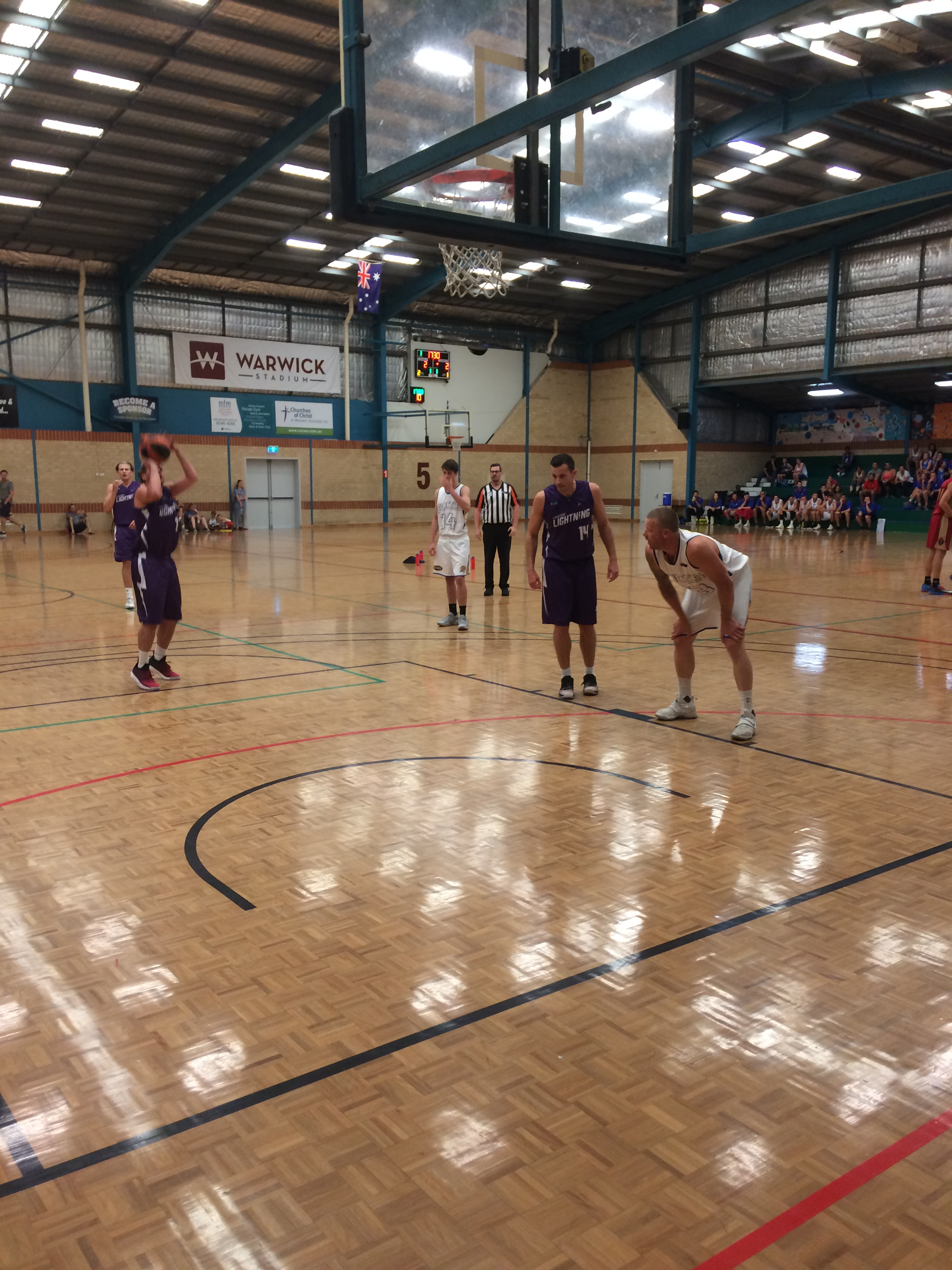
Lightning vs Buccaneers pre-season game at Warwick Stadium, 4 March 2018

The 2018 SBL Pre-Season Blitz was held at Warwick Stadium over Saturday 3 March and Sunday 4 March.

== Regular season ==
The regular season began on Friday 16 March and ended on Saturday 28 July after 20 rounds of competition. Easter games in round 3 were again scheduled for Thursday night, with all teams then on a break over the long weekend. Anzac Round took place in round 6 of the competition with the Kalamunda Eastern Suns and Willetton Tigers continuing their Anzac Day game tradition. There was also Women's Round in round 9, Rivalry Round in round 12, and Heritage Round in round 16.

=== Standings ===
Men's ladder

Pos
Pos	Team	W	L
1	Geraldton Buccaneers	23	3
2	Joondalup Wolves	21	5
3	Perth Redbacks	19	7
4	Perry Lakes Hawks	18	8
5	Lakeside Lightning	15	11
6	Stirling Senators	14	12
7	Willetton Tigers	13	13
8	Rockingham Flames	12	14
9	Cockburn Cougars	11	15
10	Kalamunda Eastern Suns	10	16
11	East Perth Eagles	9	17
12	South West Slammers	7	19
13	Mandurah Magic	5	21
14	Goldfields Giants	5	21

Women's ladder

Pos
Pos	Team	W	L
1	Lakeside Lightning	21	1
2	Perth Redbacks	17	5
3	Rockingham Flames	16	6
4	Willetton Tigers	14	8
5	Kalamunda Eastern Suns	14	8
6	Mandurah Magic	11	11
7	Stirling Senators	10	12
8	Perry Lakes Hawks	9	13
9	South West Slammers	9	13
10	Cockburn Cougars	6	16
11	Joondalup Wolves	5	17
12	East Perth Eagles	0	22

== Finals ==
The finals began on Friday 3 August and consisted of three rounds. The finals concluded with the women's grand final on Friday 31 August and the men's grand final on Saturday 1 September.

=== Men's bracket ===
Quarter-finals
1	Geraldton Buccaneers	76	89	X
8	Rockingham Flames	89	96	X
4	Perry Lakes Hawks	112	100	92
5	Lakeside Lightning	79	103	87
2	Joondalup Wolves	102	109	X
7	Willetton Tigers	66	87	X
3	Perth Redbacks	114	96	69
6	Stirling Senators	109	107	71

Semi-finals
8	Rockingham Flames	92	92	96
4	Perry Lakes Hawks	73	96	102
2	Joondalup Wolves	87	87	X
6	Stirling Senators	78	74	X

Grand final
Perry Lakes Hawks	94	X	X
Joondalup Wolves	87	X	X

==== Grand Final summary ====
1 September 2018
7:30 pm

Box score
Report
Highlights
Game replay

Joondalup Wolves 87, Perry Lakes Hawks 94
Scoring by quarter: 20–23, 24–27, 22–20, 21–24
Pts: Jalen Billups 22; Rebs: Jalen Billups 13; Asts: four players 3	Pts: Ryan Smith 24; Rebs: Brian Carlwell 18; Asts: Ben Purser 8
Perry Lakes wins SBL Championship

Bendat Basketball Centre, Floreat
MVP: Ben Purser (Hawks)

=== Women's bracket ===
Quarter-finals
1	Lakeside Lightning	81	71	X
8	Perry Lakes Hawks	75	68	X
4	Willetton Tigers	65	73	X
5	Kalamunda Eastern Suns	72	79	X
2	Perth Redbacks	92	76	X
7	Stirling Senators	67	65	X
3	Rockingham Flames	48	63	X
6	Mandurah Magic	72	71	X

Semi-finals
1	Lakeside Lightning	92	94	X
5	Kalamunda Eastern Suns	41	71	X
2	Perth Redbacks	72	82	X
6	Mandurah Magic	73	83	X

Grand final
Lakeside Lightning	75	X	X
Mandurah Magic	64	X	X

==== Grand Final summary ====
31 August 2018
7:30 pm

Box score
Report
Highlights
Game replay

Lakeside Lightning 75, Mandurah Magic 64
Scoring by quarter: 19–18, 14–15, 13–18, 29–13
Pts: Alison Schwagmeyer 25; Rebs: Ashleigh Grant 11; Asts: Courtney Byrnes 4	Pts: Anita Brown 19; Rebs: Emma-Jayne Klasztorny 11; Asts: Mihovilovich, Palusna 4 each
Lakeside wins SBL Championship

Bendat Basketball Centre, Floreat
MVP: Alison Schwagmeyer (Lightning)

== All-Star games ==
The 2018 SBL All-Star games took place at Bendat Basketball Centre on Monday 4 June, with all proceeds going to Red Frogs Australia.

=== Men's game ===
==== Rosters ====
North All-Stars
Pos	Player	Team
Starters
F	Shawn Redhage	Perth Redbacks
G	Justin King	Stirling Senators
C	Kevin Davis	Kalamunda Eastern Suns
G	Gokul Natesan	Geraldton Buccaneers
G	Drew Williamson	East Perth Eagles
Reserves
F	Jacob Holmen	Perry Lakes Hawks
G	Lochlan Cummings	Perry Lakes Hawks
F/C	Jalen Billups	Joondalup Wolves
C	Jonathan Morse	East Perth Eagles
F	Colter Lasher	Geraldton Buccaneers
G	Earnest Ross	Geraldton Buccaneers
G	Courtney Belger	Kalamunda Eastern Suns
Head coach: Ben Ettridge (Joondalup Wolves)

South All-Stars
Pos	Player	Team
Starters
F	Greg Hire	Rockingham Flames
F	Daniel Alexander	Lakeside Lightning
G	Damien Scott	Willetton Tigers
F	Gavin Field	Cockburn Cougars
G	John Isenbarger	Lakeside Lightning
Reserves
G	Kyle Armour	Willetton Tigers
C	Jarrad Prue	Lakeside Lightning
G/F	Jeylyn Sharpe	Goldfields Giants
G	Shaun Stewart	Mandurah Magic
F	Jamal Shabazz	Mandurah Magic
C	Brandon Sebirumbi	Cockburn Cougars
G	Brandon Thompson	South West Slammers
Head coach: Stephen Black (Willetton Tigers)

==== Game data ====
Highlights

4 June 2018
2:00 pm

Box Score
Report

North 123, South 110
Scoring by quarter: 35–22, 23–35, 40–24, 25–29
Pts: Belger (17); Rebs: Davis (10); Asts: Holmen (7)	Pts: Alexander (32); Rebs: Alexander (12); Asts: Stewart (7)

Bendat Basketball Centre, Floreat
MVP: Daniel Alexander

=== Women's game ===
==== Rosters ====
North All-Stars
Pos	Player	Team
Starters
C	Jennie Rintala	Kalamunda Eastern Suns
G	Antonia Farnworth	Perry Lakes Hawks
F	Nikita-Lee Martin	Joondalup Wolves
F	Alex Ciabattoni	Kalamunda Eastern Suns
F	Kayla Steindl	Perth Redbacks
Reserves
F	Eryn Fisher	East Perth Eagles
F	Jessica Jakens	Perth Redbacks
G	Jewel Williams	Kalamunda Eastern Suns
F	Amber Land	Stirling Senators
G	Mikayla Pirini	Perth Redbacks
G	Emma Clarke	Perry Lakes Hawks
G	Makailah Dyer	Perth Redbacks
Head coach: Charles Nix (Perth Redbacks)

South All-Stars
Pos	Player	Team
Starters
G	Georgia Denehey	South West Slammers
G/F	Sydnee Fipps	Lakeside Lightning
F	Ashleigh Grant	Lakeside Lightning
G/F	Alison Schwagmeyer	Lakeside Lightning
G	Anita Brown	Mandurah Magic
Reserves
F/C	Courtney Bayliss	South West Slammers
F	Kisha Lee	Cockburn Cougars
C	Maddison Allen	Rockingham Flames
G	Courtney Byrnes	Lakeside Lightning
F/C	Charlotte van Kleef	South West Slammers
F	D'Lesha Lloyd	Rockingham Flames
F	Ashli Payne	Willetton Tigers
Head coach: Craig Mansfield (Lakeside Lightning)

==== Game data ====
Highlights

4 June 2018
12:00 pm

Box Score
Report

North 76, South 103
Scoring by quarter: 24–16, 16–28, 9–17, 27–42
Pts: Steindl (20); Rebs: Steindl (8); Asts: Farnworth (4)	Pts: Schwagmeyer (21); Rebs: Schwagmeyer & Grant (9); Asts: Schwagmeyer (6)

Bendat Basketball Centre, Floreat
MVP: Alison Schwagmeyer

== Awards ==
=== Player of the Week ===
Round	Men's Player	Team	Women's Player	Team	Ref
1	Justin King	Stirling Senators	Sami Whitcomb	Willetton Tigers	
2	Justin King	Stirling Senators	Sami Whitcomb	Willetton Tigers	
3	Kevin Davis	Kalamunda Eastern Suns	Sami Whitcomb	Willetton Tigers	
4	Colter Lasher	Geraldton Buccaneers	Anita Brown	Mandurah Magic	
5	Greg Hire	Rockingham Flames	Alison Schwagmeyer	Lakeside Lightning	
6	Shawn Redhage	Perth Redbacks	Darcee Garbin	Rockingham Flames	
7	Shaun Stewart	Mandurah Magic	Maddison Allen	Rockingham Flames	
8	Brian Voelkel	South West Slammers	Jennie Rintala	Kalamunda Eastern Suns	
9	Jeylyn Sharpe	Goldfields Giants	Kayla Steindl	Perth Redbacks	
10	Daniel Alexander	Lakeside Lightning	Alison Schwagmeyer	Lakeside Lightning	
11	Jalen Billups	Joondalup Wolves	Natalie Burton	Perry Lakes Hawks	
12	Gokul Natesan	Geraldton Buccaneers	Kayla Steindl	Perth Redbacks	
13	Jonathan Morse	East Perth Eagles	Kisha Lee	Cockburn Cougars	
14	Daniel Alexander	Lakeside Lightning	Alex Ciabattoni	Kalamunda Eastern Suns	
15	Kyle Sovine	Goldfields Giants	Kisha Lee	Cockburn Cougars	
16	Brian Voelkel	South West Slammers	Kayla Steindl	Perth Redbacks	
17	Earnest Ross	Geraldton Buccaneers	Antonia Farnworth	Perry Lakes Hawks	
18	Jalen Billups	Joondalup Wolves	Maddison Allen	Rockingham Flames	
19	Gavin Field	Cockburn Cougars	Ashleigh Grant	Lakeside Lightning	
20	Travis Durnin	South West Slammers	Alex Ciabattoni	Kalamunda Eastern Suns	

=== Statistics leaders ===
Category	Men's Player	Team	Stat	Women's Player	Team	Stat
Points per game	Daniel Alexander	Lakeside Lightning	27.24	Anita Brown	Mandurah Magic	24.18
Rebounds per game	Jarrad Prue	Lakeside Lightning	19.48	Natalie Burton	Perry Lakes Hawks	12
Assists per game	Brian Voelkel	South West Slammers	7.63	Alex Ciabattoni	Kalamunda Eastern Suns	5.45
Steals per game	Courtney Belger	Kalamunda Eastern Suns	2.5	Cameron Flynn	East Perth Eagles	2.65
Blocks per game	Curtis Washington	Rockingham Flames	1.58	Maddison Allen	Rockingham Flames	2.86
Field goal percentage	Kevin Davis	Kalamunda Eastern Suns	67.20%	Jessica Jakens	Perth Redbacks	55.06%
3-pt field goal percentage	Ryan Smith	Perry Lakes Hawks	46.43%	Taneisha Harrison	Rockingham Flames	42.53%
Free throw percentage	Justin King	Stirling Senators	86.96%	Sydnee Fipps	Lakeside Lightning	86.27%

=== Regular season ===
The 2018 Basketball WA Annual Awards Night was held on Saturday 8 September at Crown Perth.

- Men's Most Valuable Player: Jalen Billups (Joondalup Wolves)
- Women's Most Valuable Player: Alison Schwagmeyer (Lakeside Lightning)
- Men's Coach of the Year: Dave Daniels (Lakeside Lightning)
- Women's Coach of the Year: Craig Mansfield (Lakeside Lightning)
- Men's Most Improved Player: Travis Durnin (South West Slammers)
- Women's Most Improved Player: Jewel Williams (Kalamunda Eastern Suns)
- All-MSBL First Team:
  - PG: Jack Isenbarger (Lakeside Lightning)
  - SG: Gavin Field (Cockburn Cougars)
  - SF: Ben Purser (Perry Lakes Hawks)
  - PF: Jalen Billups (Joondalup Wolves)
  - C: Daniel Alexander (Lakeside Lightning)
- All-WSBL First Team:
  - PG: Alison Schwagmeyer (Lakeside Lightning)
  - SG: Anita Brown (Mandurah Magic)
  - SF: Antonia Farnworth (Perry Lakes Hawks)
  - PF: Jennie Rintala (Kalamunda Eastern Suns)
  - C: Kayla Steindl (Perth Redbacks)
- Men's All-Defensive Team:
  - PG: Gokul Natesan (Geraldton Buccaneers)
  - SG: Damien Scott (Willetton Tigers)
  - SF: Ben Purser (Perry Lakes Hawks)
  - PF: Maurice Barrow (Perth Redbacks)
  - C: Jarrad Prue (Lakeside Lightning)
- Women's All-Defensive Team:
  - PG: Brianna Moyes (Cockburn Cougars)
  - SG: Alex Ciabattoni (Kalamunda Eastern Suns)
  - SF: Antonia Farnworth (Perry Lakes Hawks)
  - PF: Ashleigh Grant (Lakeside Lightning)
  - C: Maddison Allen (Rockingham Flames)

=== Finals ===
- Men's Grand Final MVP: Ben Purser (Perry Lakes Hawks)
- Women's Grand Final MVP: Alison Schwagmeyer (Lakeside Lightning)
