= All-NBL1 West First Team =

The All-NBL1 West First Team is an annual NBL1 West honour bestowed on the best players in the league each year. Under the State Basketball League (SBL) brand, a five-player all-star team was named every year between 2005 and 2019. On a few occasions, the Most Valuable Player has not been named in the All-Star Five / First Team.

== Selections ==
Player (X)	Denotes the number of times the player has been selected
**Player** **(in bold text)**	Indicates the player who won the Most Valuable Player in the same year

=== 2005 to 2008 ===
From the 2005 season to 2008 season, the team was composed of five roster spots and selected without regard to position. The players are therefore listed in alphabetical order.

Year	Women		Men		Ref
Year	Players	Teams	Players	Teams	Ref
2005	Christine Boyd	Perth Redbacks	Shamus Ballantyne	Goldfields Giants	
2005	**Rohanee Cox**	Willetton Tigers	**Eric Brand**	Geraldton Buccaneers	
2005	Emily Fielding	South West Slammers	Eric Carter	Perry Lakes Hawks	
2005	Tanya Kelly	Perry Lakes Hawks	Andy Gilbert	Lakeside Lightning	
2005	Renee Wharekura	Perry Lakes Hawks	Carmichael Olowoyo	Rockingham Flames	
2006	Melinda Bartlett	Wanneroo Wolves	Shamus Ballantyne (2)	Goldfields Giants	
2006	Christine Boyd (2)	Perth Redbacks	Luke Mackay	Perth Redbacks	
2006	Kristi Channing	Lakeside Lightning	Carmichael Olowoyo (2)	Stirling Senators	
2006	Brooke Hiddlestone	Perth Redbacks	Paul Rogers	Willetton Tigers	
2006	**Tanya Kelly** (2)	Perry Lakes Hawks	Ty Shaw	Goldfields Giants	
2007	**Christine Boyd** (3)	Perth Redbacks	Robert Epps	Willetton Tigers	
2007	Myra Donkin	Lakeside Lightning	Jason Harris	Geraldton Buccaneers	
2007	Liz Cooke	Stirling Senators	Michael Lay	Geraldton Buccaneers	
2007	Tanya Kelly (3)	Perry Lakes Hawks	**Aaron Shaw**	Lakeside Lightning	
2007	Carly Wilson	Stirling Senators	Ty Shaw (2)	Goldfields Giants	
2008	Rebecca Duke	Willetton Tigers	Peter Crawford	Perry Lakes Hawks	
2008	Eleanor Haring	Stirling Senators	Jeff Dowdell	Wanneroo Wolves	
2008	Tanya Kelly (4)	Perry Lakes Hawks	Michael Lay (2)	Geraldton Buccaneers	
2008	**Deanna Smith**	Perry Lakes Hawks	**Curtis Marshall**	Geraldton Buccaneers	
2008	Carly Wilson (2)	Stirling Senators	Sean Sonderleiter	Perry Lakes Hawks	

=== 2009 to 2019 ===
From the 2009 season to 2019 season, the team was composed of five roster spots and selected with regard to position. The players are therefore listed according to the position they were assigned in the official league awards.

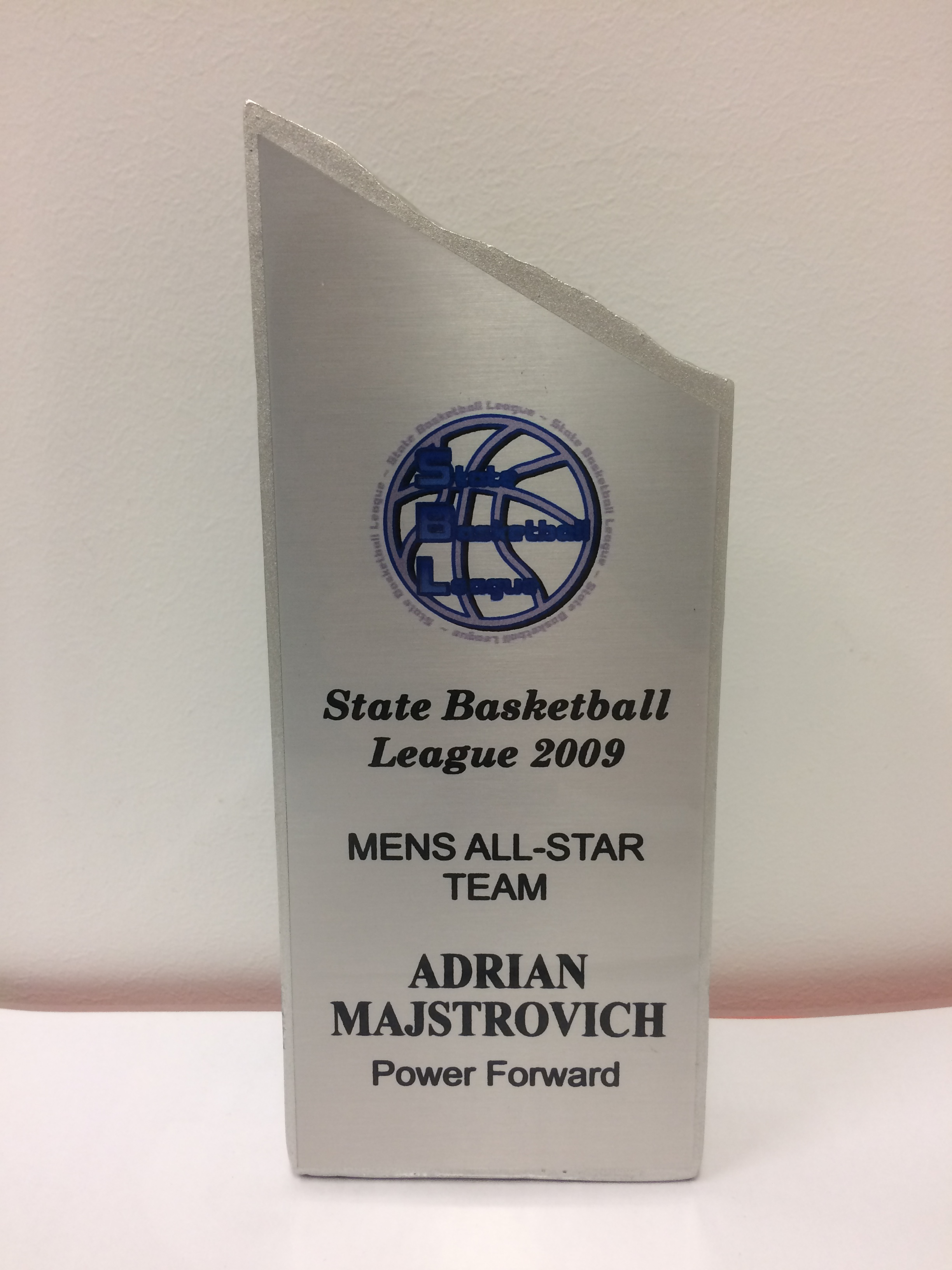
Adrian Majstrovich's 2009 All-Star Team trophy

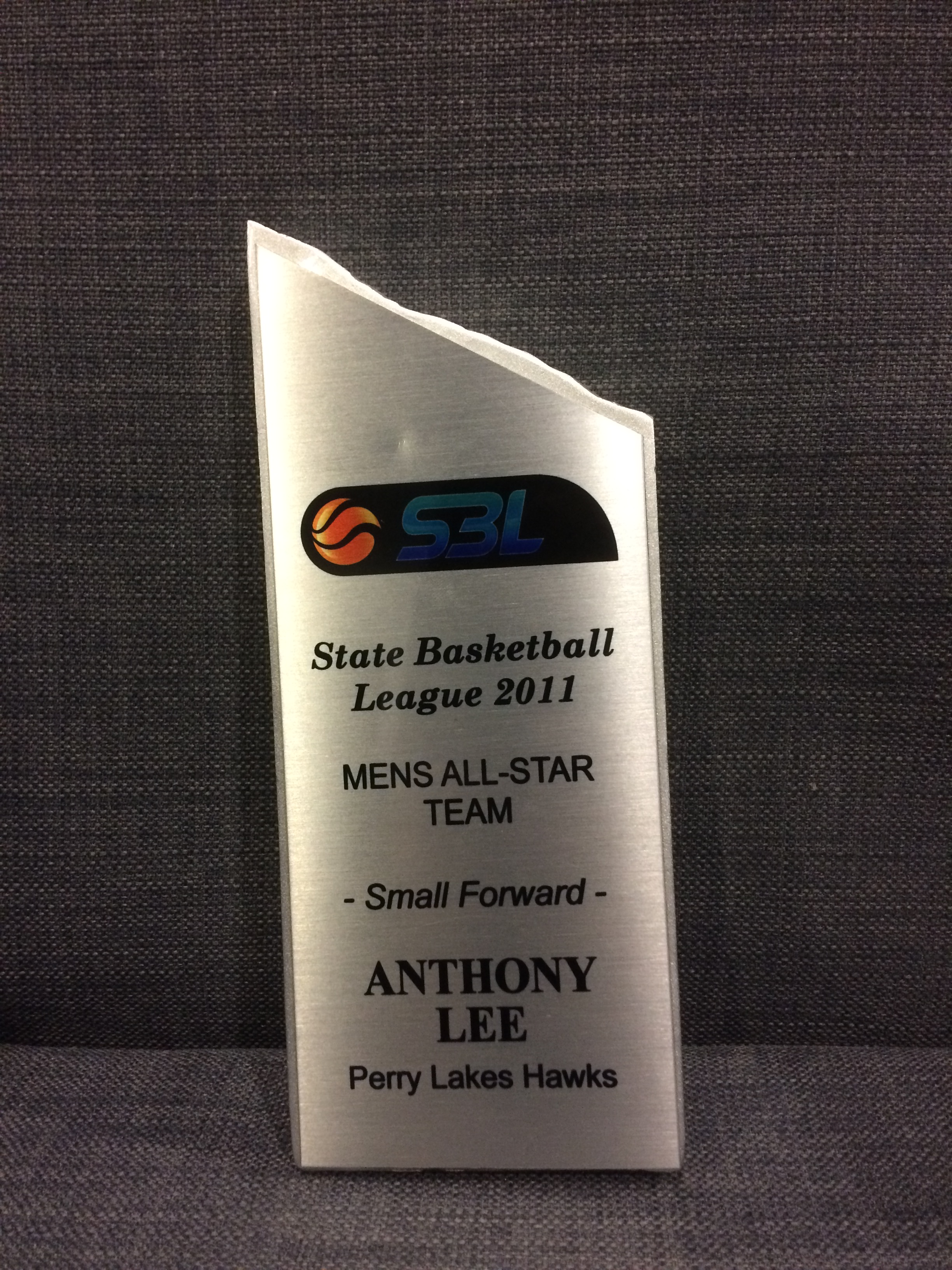
Anthony Lee's 2011 All-Star Team trophy

Year	Women		Men		Ref
Year	Players	Teams	Players	Teams	Ref
2009	PG: Kate Malpass	Willetton Tigers	PG: Shamus Ballantyne (3)	Goldfields Giants	
2009	SG: Natalie Young	Lakeside Lightning	SG: Luke Payne	Lakeside Lightning	
2009	SF: Deanna Smith (2)	Perry Lakes Hawks	SF: **Luke Meyer**	Geraldton Buccaneers	
2009	PF: Ashley Gilmore	Willetton Tigers	PF: Adrian Majstrovich	Kalamunda Eastern Suns	
2009	C: Shelly Boston	Mandurah Magic	C: Jarrad Prue	Lakeside Lightning	
2010	PG: Kate Malpass (2)	Willetton Tigers	PG: Joel Wagner	Perth Redbacks	
2010	SG: Casey Mihovilovich	Mandurah Magic	SG: **Ryan Zamroz**	Geraldton Buccaneers	
2010	SF: **Kaye Tucker**	Rockingham Flames	SF: Cameron Tovey	Willetton Tigers	
2010	PF: Samantha Norwood	East Perth Eagles	PF: Adrian Majstrovich (2)	Kalamunda Eastern Suns	
2010	C: Marita Payne	Perth Redbacks	C: Jarrad Prue (2)	Lakeside Lightning	
2011	PG: Kate Malpass (3)	Willetton Tigers	PG: Ty Harrelson	Cockburn Cougars	
2011	SG: **Casey Mihovilovich** (2)	Mandurah Magic	SG: Luke Payne (2)	Lakeside Lightning	
2011	SF: Jasmine Hooper	Willetton Tigers	SF: **Anthony Lee**	Perry Lakes Hawks	
2011	PF: Leah Rush	Kalamunda Eastern Suns	PF: Greg Hire	Wanneroo Wolves	
2011	C: Samantha Norwood (2)	East Perth Eagles	C: Tom Jervis	East Perth Eagles	
2012	PG: Adrienne Jones	Kalamunda Eastern Suns	PG: Joel Wagner (2)	Perth Redbacks	
2012	SG: Kim Sitzmann	South West Slammers	SG: Luke Payne (3)	Lakeside Lightning	
2012	SF: Jasmine Hooper (2)	Willetton Tigers	SF: Ty Harrelson (2)	Goldfields Giants	
2012	PF: Stephanie Jones	Cockburn Cougars	PF: **Damian Matacz**	Wanneroo Wolves	
2012	C: **Emma Cannon**	Rockingham Flames	C: Tom Jervis (2)	East Perth Eagles	
2013	PG: Taylor Wild	Stirling Senators	PG: Ty Harrelson (3)	South West Slammers	
2013	SG: Kim Sitzmann (2)	South West Slammers	SG: Quinn McDowell	Willetton Tigers	
2013	SF: **Sami Whitcomb**	Rockingham Flames	SF: **Ben Beran**	Lakeside Lightning	
2013	PF: Lisa Wallbutton	Willetton Tigers	PF: Taylor Mullenax	Mandurah Magic	
2013	C: Marita Payne (2)	Perth Redbacks	C: Tom Jervis (3)	East Perth Eagles	
2014	PG: Casey Mihovilovich (3)	Mandurah Magic	PG: Kyle Armour	East Perth Eagles	
2014	SG: **Sami Whitcomb** (2)	Rockingham Flames	SG: Seb Salinas	Joondalup Wolves	
2014	SF: Alison Schwagmeyer	Kalamunda Eastern Suns	SF: Stan Okoye	Perth Redbacks	
2014	PF: Kari Pickens	Lakeside Lightning	PF: **Cooper Land**	Rockingham Flames	
2014	C: Marita Payne (3)	Cockburn Cougars	C: Jarrad Prue (3)	Lakeside Lightning	
2015	PG: Kate Malpass (4)	Willetton Tigers	PG: Tre Nichols	South West Slammers	
2015	SG: Casey Mihovilovich (4)	Mandurah Magic	SG: Jordan Swing	Lakeside Lightning	
2015	SF: **Sami Whitcomb** (3)	Rockingham Flames	SF: Bennie Lewis	Geraldton Buccaneers	
2015	PF: Deanna Smith (3)	Cockburn Cougars	PF: Gavin Field	Cockburn Cougars	
2015	C: Louella Tomlinson	Willetton Tigers	C: **Ray Turner**	Perth Redbacks	
2016	PG: Shani Amos	Joondalup Wolves	PG: Tre Nichols (2)	South West Slammers	
2016	SG: Sami Whitcomb (4)	Rockingham Flames	SG: Matthew Adekponya	Geraldton Buccaneers	
2016	SF: Klara Wischer	Joondalup Wolves	SF: Gavin Field (2)	Cockburn Cougars	
2016	PF: Candace Williams	Cockburn Cougars	PF: Daniel Alexander	Lakeside Lightning	
2016	C: Louella Tomlinson (2)	Willetton Tigers	C: Marcus Goode	Cockburn Cougars	
2017	PG: Nici Gilday	Mandurah Magic	PG: Tre Nichols (3)	South West Slammers	
2017	SG: Stacey Barr	Willetton Tigers	SG: Dwayne Benjamin	Geraldton Buccaneers	
2017	SF: **Alison Schwagmeyer** (2)	Lakeside Lightning	SF: Brian Voelkel	South West Slammers	
2017	PF: Carly Boag	Mandurah Magic	PF: Shawn Redhage	Perth Redbacks	
2017	C: Natalie Burton	Perry Lakes Hawks	C: Ray Turner (2)	Willetton Tigers	
2018	PG: **Alison Schwagmeyer** (3)	Lakeside Lightning	PG: Jack Isenbarger	Lakeside Lightning	
2018	SG: Anita Brown	Mandurah Magic	SG: Gavin Field (3)	Cockburn Cougars	
2018	SF: Antonia Farnworth	Perry Lakes Hawks	SF: Ben Purser	Perry Lakes Hawks	
2018	PF: Jennie Rintala	Kalamunda Eastern Suns	PF: **Jalen Billups**	Joondalup Wolves	
2018	C: Kayla Steindl	Perth Redbacks	C: Daniel Alexander (2)	Lakeside Lightning	
2019	PG: Lauren Mansfield	Perth Redbacks	PG: Marshall Nelson	Perth Redbacks	
2019	SG: **Stacey Barr** (2)	Warwick Senators	SG: **Joshua Braun**	Kalamunda Eastern Suns	
2019	SF: Laina Snyder	Willetton Tigers	SF: Gavin Field (4)	Cockburn Cougars	
2019	PF: Darcee Garbin	Rockingham Flames	PF: Greg Hire (2)	Rockingham Flames	
2019	C: Amber Land	Joondalup Wolves	C: Patrick Burke	Goldfields Giants	
2020	Season cancelled due to COVID-19 pandemic				

=== 2021 to present ===
Since the 2021 season, the team has been composed of five roster spots and selected without regard to position. The players are therefore listed in alphabetical order.

Year	Women		Men		Ref
Year	Players	Teams	Players	Teams	Ref
2021	Stacey Barr (3)	Warwick Senators	Jay Bowie	Lakeside Lightning	
2021	Mary Goulding	East Perth Eagles	Scott Machado	Mandurah Magic	
2021	Samantha Lubcke	Willetton Tigers	Mathiang Muo	Geraldton Buccaneers	
2021	**Alexandra Sharp**	Willetton Tigers	**Nic Pozoglou**	Cockburn Cougars	
2021	Kayla Steindl (2)	Joondalup Wolves	Louis Timms	Perth Redbacks	
2022	**Stacey Barr** (4)	Warwick Senators	Cameron Coleman	Geraldton Buccaneers	
2022	Emma Clarke	Perry Lakes Hawks	Caleb Davis	Warwick Senators	
2022	Jessie Edwards	Cockburn Cougars	Marshall Nelson (2)	Rockingham Flames	
2022	Teige Morrell	Joondalup Wolves	C. J. Turnage	Joondalup Wolves	
2022	Robbi Ryan	Joondalup Wolves	**Devondrick Walker**	Rockingham Flames	
2023	Stacey Barr (5)	Warwick Senators	Joe Cook-Green	Kalamunda Eastern Suns	
2023	Mehryn Kraker	Rockingham Flames	Quintin Dove	Joondalup Wolves	
2023	Teige Morrell (2)	Joondalup Wolves	Gorjok Gak	Willetton Tigers	
2023	Sarah Mortensen	Cockburn Cougars	Malik Muenier	Geraldton Buccaneers	
2023	**Alexandra Sharp** (2)	Willetton Tigers	**Devondrick Walker** (2)	Rockingham Flames	
2024	Natalie Chou	Perth Redbacks	Gorjok Gak (2)	Rockingham Flames	
2024	Alex Ciabattoni	Cockburn Cougars	Michael Harris	Warwick Senators	
2024	Chloe Forster	Warwick Senators	**Joel Murray**	Mandurah Magic	
2024	Anneli Maley	Perth Redbacks	De'Sean Parsons	Goldfields Giants	
2024	**Teige Morrell** (3)	Lakeside Lightning	C. J. Turnage (2)	Joondalup Wolves	
2025	Zitina Aokuso	Willetton Tigers	Johny Narkle	Geraldton Buccaneers	
2025	Chloe Forster (2)	Warwick Senators	De'Sean Parsons (2)	Goldfields Giants	
2025	Anneli Maley (2)	Perth Redbacks	Elijah Pepper	Warwick Senators	
2025	**Teige Morrell** (4)	Lakeside Lightning	C. J. Turnage (3)	Joondalup Wolves	
2025	Sarah Mortensen (2)	Cockburn Cougars	**Isaac White**	Rockingham Flames	
2026	**Jessie Edwards** (2)	Cockburn Cougars	Sharif Black	Joondalup Wolves	
2026	Makenna Marisa	Perry Lakes Hawks	Jack Browder	Perry Lakes Hawks	
2026	Sierra Moore	Goldfields Giants	Cameron Huefner	Perry Lakes Hawks	
2026	Mikayla Pivec	Mandurah Magic	Liam Hunt	Geraldton Buccaneers	
2026	Sara Puckett	Rockingham Flames	**Isaac White** (2)	Rockingham Flames	
