= Alison Schwagmeyer =

American basketball player (born 1990)

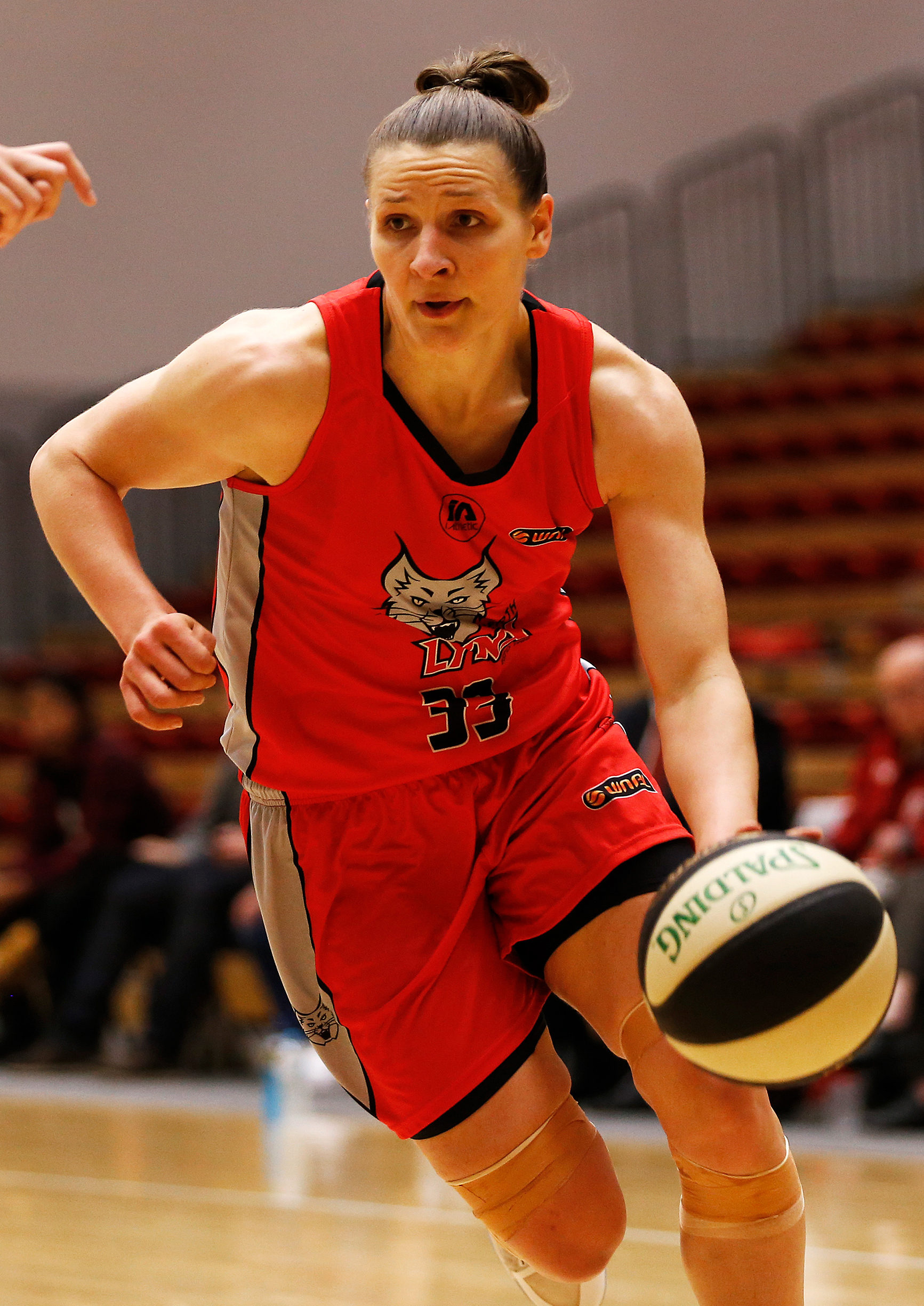
- Schwagmeyer with the Perth Lynx in 2017

Personal information
- Born: July 31, 1990 (age 36)
- Listed height: 180 cm (5 ft 11 in)
- Listed weight: 80 kg (176 lb)

Career information
- High school: Central (Camp Point, Illinois)
- College: Charleston Southern (2008–2010); Quincy (2010–2012)
- WNBA draft: 2012: undrafted
- Playing career: 2012–2023
- Position: Shooting guard / small forward

Career history
- 2012–2014: GiroLive Panthers
- 2014: Kalamunda Eastern Suns
- 2014: CSBT Alexandria
- 2014: Cadí La Seu D'urgell
- 2016–2019: Lakeside Lightning
- 2017–2020: Perth Lynx
- 2020: Sydney Uni Flames
- 2021: Crvena zvezda
- 2022–2023: UC Capitals

Career highlights
- WNBL Sixth Woman of the Year (2020); SBL champion (2018); SBL Grand Final MVP (2018); 3× SBL Most Valuable Player (2016–2018); 3× SBL All-Star Five (2014, 2017, 2018); SBL All-Defensive Five (2017); GLVC Player of the Year (2011); 2× First-team All-GLVC (2011, 2012); Big South All-Freshman Team (2009)

Alison Renee Schwagmeyer (born July 31, 1990) is an American former professional basketball player. She played college basketball for the Charleston Southern Buccaneers and the Quincy Hawks before playing in Germany, Australia, Romania, Spain, and Serbia. In Australia, she helped the Lakeside Lightning win the SBL championship in 2018 and earned three consecutive SBL Most Valuable Player awards. She also played in the Women's National Basketball League (WNBL) for the Perth Lynx, Sydney Uni Flames and UC Capitals.

== High school career ==
Schwagmeyer attended Central High School in Camp Point, Illinois. She earned four varsity letters in basketball and holds school career records for points (1,950) and steals (500). She was a two-time all-state selection for basketball and was the Herald-Whig Player of the Year in volleyball in 2007.

== College career ==
Schwagmeyer played her first two college basketball seasons with the Charleston Southern Buccaneers. She averaged 8.5 points and 6.8 rebounds per game and earned Big South All-Freshman Team honors in 2008–09, and averaged 6.9 points and 7.6 rebounds per game as a sophomore in 2009–10.

Schwagmeyer transferred to Quincy University for the 2010–11 season and went on to be named the GLVC Player of the Year as a junior. She also earned GLVC First Team All-Conference honors and was named Daktronics First Team All-Region. In 28 games for the Hawks, she made 27 starts and averaged 17.6 points and 6.6 rebounds per game.

In 27 games for Quincy as a senior in 2011–12, Schwagmeyer made 26 starts and averaged 18.0 points, 7.9 rebounds, 3.2 assists and 2.0 steals per game. She subsequently earned first-team All-GLVC honors for the second year in a row.

=== College statistics ===
Legend
GP	Games played	GS	Games started	MPG	Minutes per game
FG%	Field goal percentage	3P%	3-point field goal percentage	FT%	Free throw percentage
RPG	Rebounds per game	APG	Assists per game	SPG	Steals per game
BPG	Blocks per game	PPG	Points per game	**Bold**	Career high

Year	Team	GP	Points	FG%	3P%	FT%	RPG	APG	SPG	BPG	PPG
2008–09	Charleston Southern	**30**	254	40.9%	32.3%	63.6%	6.8	1.2	1.7	–	8.5
2009–10	Charleston Southern	28	192	42.6%	17.9%	60.7%	7.6	1.5	1.4	**0.2**	6.9
2010–11	Quincy	28	**493**	**50.4%**	28.9%	73.9%	6.6	**4.3**	1.6	0.1	17.6
2011–12	Quincy	27	485	45.4%	**39.0%**	**79.2%**	**7.9**	3.2	**2.1**	0.1	**18.0**
Career		113	1424	45.6%	11.1%	71.7%	8.8	2.5	1.7	0.1	12.6

== Professional career ==
=== Germany (2012–2014) ===
In July 2012, Schwagmeyer signed with the GiroLive Panthers of the German Damen-Basketball-Bundesliga. In 30 games in 2012–13, she averaged 14.0 points, 8.1 rebounds and 1.3 steals per game.

After suffering an ankle injury in the off-season, Schwagmeyer returned to the GiroLive Panthers in January 2014. In 11 games to finish the 2013–14 season, she averaged 15.2 points, 8.1 rebounds, 2.2 assists and 2.0 steals per game.

=== Australia (2014) ===
In April 2014, Schwagmeyer moved to Australia to play for the Kalamunda Eastern Suns in the State Basketball League (SBL). She was named Player of the Week for Round 15 for her back-to-back 20-point games. She averaged 19.1 points, 7.5 rebounds, 4.0 assists and 2.4 steals per game for the Suns, earning All-Star Five honors.

=== Romania and Spain (2014) ===
For the 2014–15 season, Schwagmeyer moved to Romania to play for CSBT Alexandria. She played just one game for Alexandria, scoring 30 points in 20 minutes, before accepting an offer from a first division team in Spain. She joined Cadí La Seu D'urgell, but she left the team in December 2014 to return home following the death of her sister.

=== Return to Australia (2016–2020) ===
After some time away from the game, Schwagmeyer returned to Australia in 2016 to play for the Lakeside Lightning in the SBL. She produced a number of standout performances despite playing through injury most of the season. She averaged 20.6 points, 6.6 rebounds, 3.4 assists and 2.5 steals per game in 23 contests, and was named the SBL's Most Valuable Player.

Schwagmeyer returned to the Lightning in 2017 as co-captain. She helped the Lightning improve from 11–11 to 17–5; played for the South All-Stars in the SBL All-Star Game; won five Player of the Week awards; and won her second straight SBL MVP award to go with All-Star Five and All-Defensive Five honors. In 27 games, she averaged 21.9 points, 8.4 rebounds and 4.6 assists per game.

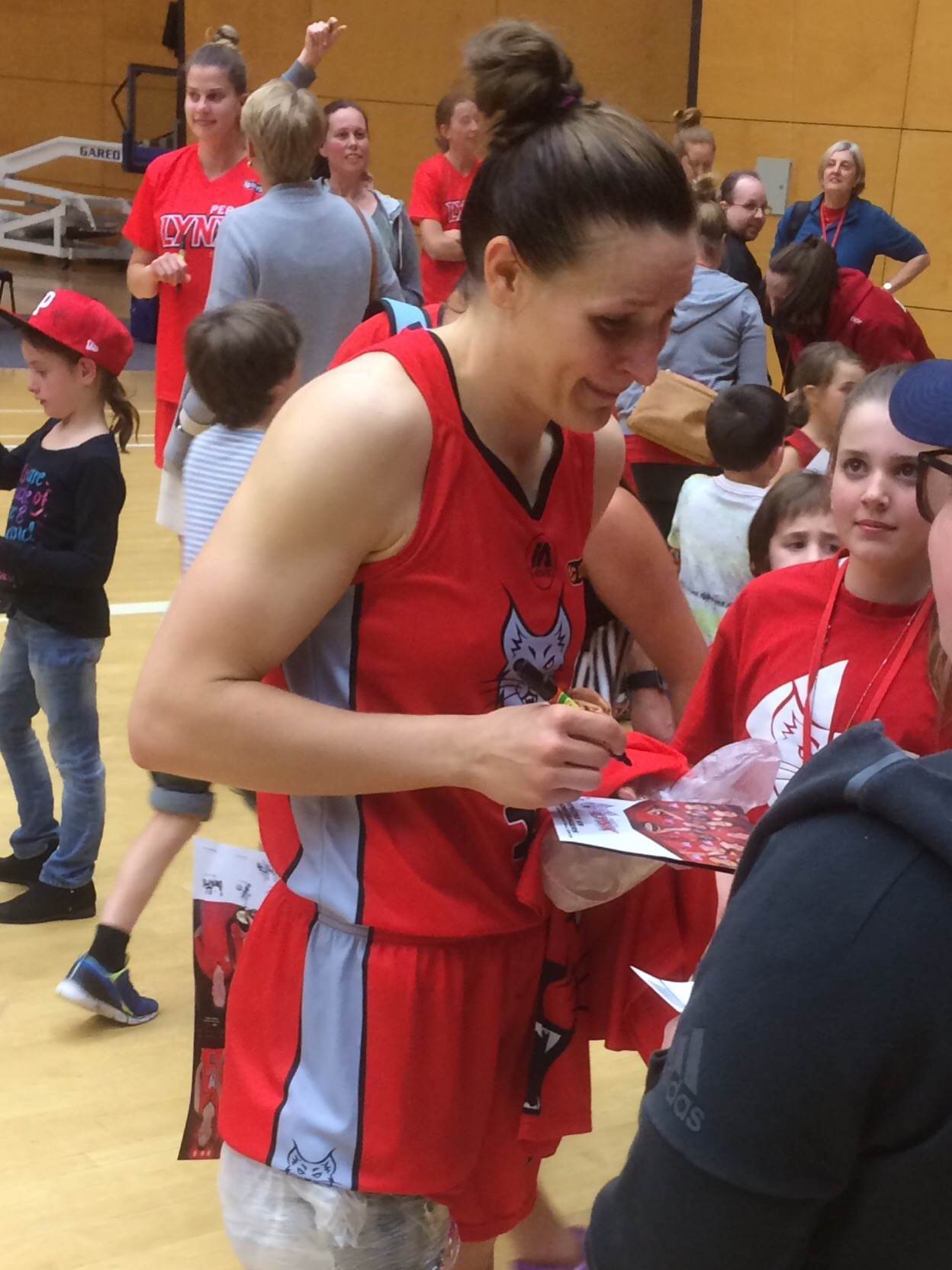
Schwagmeyer signing autographs in October 2017 following her WNBL debut for the Perth Lynx

Following the 2017 SBL season, there were hopes of Schwagmeyer joining the Perth Lynx of the Women's National Basketball League (WNBL) for the 2017–18 season after she had applied to become a permanent resident in Australia. The lengthy process meant she was unable to be part of the full squad due to import restrictions, but an injury to import guard Courtney Williams led to Schwagmeyer making her WNBL debut on October 27, 2017. She stepped straight into the starting five and had a big impact with her defensive energy against the Dandenong Rangers. She finished with 10 points in the 88–78 win, including seven consecutive points from late in the third quarter to early in the final period. Delays in her permanent residency application saw Schwagmeyer watch from the sidelines for the remainder of the season. She was subsequently named the recipient of the Perth Lynx Coaches' Award.

Schwagmeyer returned to the Lightning in 2018 for a third season. She won Player of the Week for rounds 5 and 10, won MVP of the All-Star Game, and helped the Lightning win the minor premiership and reach the SBL Grand Final. In the grand final, the Lightning defeated the Mandurah Magic 75–64 behind a 25-point performance from Schwagmeyer that garnered her Grand Final MVP honors. To conclude the year, she was named league MVP for the third straight year to go with All-Star Five honors. In 24 games, she averaged 22.4 points, 7.5 rebounds and 4.8 assists per game.

Having received her Australian residency, Schwagmeyer signed a full-time contract with the Perth Lynx as an unrestricted player on June 14, 2018, rejecting European contracts and the chance to be closer to her partner to play in the WNBL. She averaged 14 points, 4.59 rebounds, 1.95 assists and 1.14 steals in the 2018–19 season, and was selected in the WNBL Team of the Week in round eight. Round eight featured her best game of the season, with 22 points, five rebounds, three assists, and two steals in a four-point win over the UC Capitals.

Schwagmeyer returned to the Lightning in 2019, but only for the first seven rounds.

Schwagmeyer returned to the Lynx for the 2019–20 season. She took a different approach to training in the off-season, shedding 10 kg to enter her second full WNBL season looking to play lighter. She missed the last three games of the season with a right foot injury. For the season, she earned WNBL Sixth Woman of the Year honors after averaging 15.3 points, 5.6 rebounds and 1.9 assists per game with predominately a bench role.

On July 1, 2020, Schwagmeyer signed with the Sydney Uni Flames. During the 2020 WNBL Hub season in Queensland, she averaged 13.3 points, 5.7 rebounds, 3.0 assists and 2.2 steals per game.

=== Serbia (2021) ===
On October 9, 2021, Schwagmeyer signed with Crvena zvezda of the Basketball League of Serbia for the 2021–22 season. After the team's EuroCup season ended on December 22, Schwagmeyer was rested for team's December 26 match and then did not appear again in the new year. In six league games, she averaged 10.3 points, 3.2 rebounds, 1.8 assists and 1.5 steals per game. In five EuroCup games, she averaged 9.8 points, 4.4 rebounds and 2.4 assists per game.

=== Return to Australia (2022–2023) ===
On December 9, 2022, Schwagmeyer signed with the University of Canberra Capitals. She played two games for the Capitals in the 2022–23 WNBL season.

== Coaching career ==
In June 2024, Schwagmeyer was named head coach of the John Wood Community College women's basketball team.

== Personal life ==
Schwagmeyer is the daughter of Mike and Sherry Schwagmeyer. She has one brother, Corey, and three sisters, Lori, Kim and Angie (deceased). Her sister Angie died in a car crash in St. Louis in 2014.

Following the death of her sister, Schwagmeyer remained in the United States throughout 2015 and served as an assistant coach for the Hannibal–LaGrange University women's basketball team while also working at the Quincy YMCA.

In February 2018, Schwagmeyer received her Australian permanent resident status.

In July 2019, Schwagmeyer married long-time boyfriend and fellow basketball player Courtney Belger. He too has played in Germany and in the State Basketball League.
