= Kisha Lee =

American basketball player

Personal information
- Born: July 11, 1985 (age 41) Chicago, Illinois
- Listed height: 182 cm (6 ft 0 in)

Career information
- High school: Carver (Chicago, Illinois)
- College: UNLV (2003–2007)
- WNBA draft: 2007: undrafted
- Playing career: 2007–2021
- Position: Forward

Career history
- 2007–2008: Celeritas-Donar
- 2008–2009: BC Powerbasket Wels
- 2009: Bundaberg Bears
- 2009–2010: Helios Basket
- 2010: Chicago Steam
- 2010–2011: Sheffield Hatters
- 2011: Bundaberg Bears
- 2012–2013: Toowoomba Mountaineers
- 2013–2014: Sheffield Hatters
- 2014–2015: Toowoomba Mountaineers
- 2015: Ansett
- 2016–2017: Perth Lynx
- 2017: Stirling Senators
- 2018–2019: Cockburn Cougars
- 2019: USC Rip City
- 2020: Gold Coast Rollers
- 2021: South West Metro Pirates

Career highlights
- 2× SBL All-Star (2017, 2018); EBL champion (2011); Austrian Cup champion (2009)

Kisha Lee (born July 11, 1985) is an American former professional basketball player. She played college basketball for UNLV.

== UNLV statistics ==
Legend
GP	Games played	GS	Games started	MPG	Minutes per game
FG%	Field goal percentage	3P%	3-point field goal percentage	FT%	Free throw percentage
RPG	Rebounds per game	APG	Assists per game	SPG	Steals per game
BPG	Blocks per game	PPG	Points per game	**Bold**	Career high

Year	Team	GP	Points	FG%	3P%	FT%	RPG	APG	SPG	BPG	PPG
2003–04	UNLV	5	8	**66.7%**	0.0%	–	1.4	0.2	–	–	1.6
2004–05	UNLV	24	80	54.2%	0.0%	66.7%	2.6	0.5	0.2	0.1	3.3
2005–06	UNLV	**30**	**198**	54.2%	44.4%	**77.4%**	**3.6**	0.3	0.7	0.1	**6.6**
2006–07	UNLV	17	105	37.0%	26.3%	60.0%	3.0	**0.8**	**0.7**	**0.2**	6.2
Career		76	391	48.4%	34.2%	69.3%	3.0	0.5	0.5	0.1	5.1

== Professional career ==
Lee's first two professional seasons were spent in Europe, playing for Dutch team Celeritas-Donar in 2007–08, and then Austrian team BC Powerbasket Wels in 2008–09. After a stint with the Bundaberg Bears of the Queensland Basketball League (QBL) during the 2009 Australian winter, Lee returned to Europe for the 2009–10 season, joining Swiss team Helios Basket. She then had a stint with the Chicago Steam in 2010 before moving to England to play for the Sheffield Hatters. She helped the Haters win the 2010–11 EBL championship.

Between 2011 and 2013, she played three straight seasons in the QBL with Bundaberg (2011) and the Toowoomba Mountaineers (2012–13). She returned to the Sheffield Hatters for the 2013–14 EBL season before re-joining the Mountaineers for the 2014 season. In 2015, she split her year with Toowoomba and in Darwin with Ansett. In 13 games for Ansett, she averaged 19 points per game.

In August 2016, Lee joined the Perth Lynx of the Women's National Basketball League (WNBL). Following the 2016–17 WNBL season, Lee remained in Perth and played in the State Basketball League (SBL) for the Stirling Senators. She continued on in the SBL in 2018 and 2019, playing for the Cockburn Cougars. In June 2019, Lee left the Cougars and returned to Queensland, where she joined the USC Rip City.

In 2020, Lee played for the Gold Coast Rollers of the Queensland State League (QSL). In 2021, she joined the South West Metro Pirates of the NBL1 North.
