= Kayla Steindl =

American basketball player (born 1989)

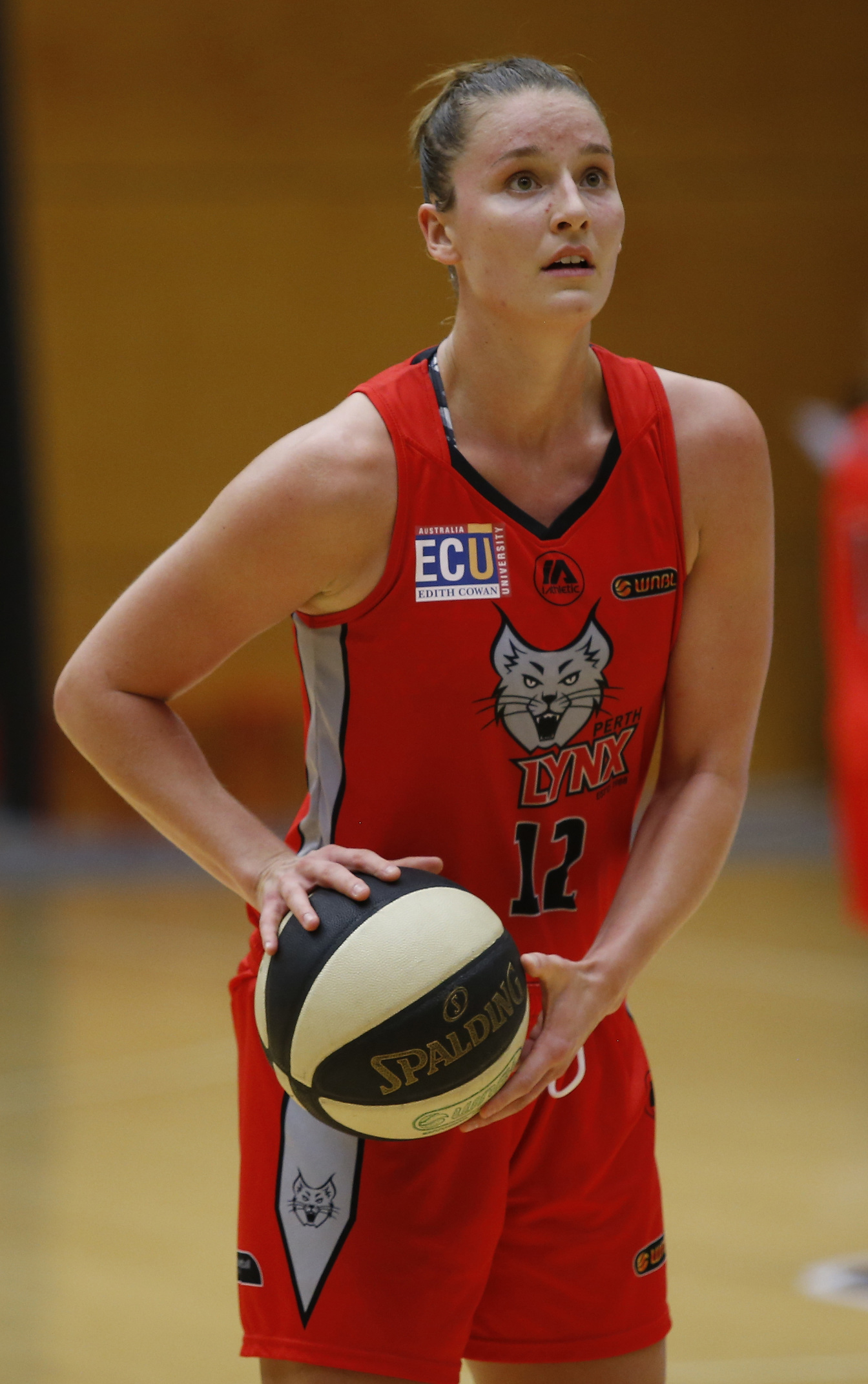
- Steindl with the Perth Lynx in 2018

Personal information
- Born: November 19, 1989 (age 36) Ellensburg, Washington, U.S.
- Listed height: 187 cm (6 ft 2 in)

Career information
- High school: Ellensburg (Ellensburg, Washington)
- College: Gonzaga (2008–2012)
- WNBA draft: 2012: 2nd round, 19th overall pick
- Drafted by: Minnesota Lynx
- Playing career: 2012–present
- Position: Forward

Career history
- 2012–2014: Townsville Fire
- 2013–2015: Mackay Meteorettes
- 2015–2016: Adelaide Lightning
- 2016: Frankston Blues
- 2016–2017: Townsville Fire
- 2017–2019: Perth Lynx
- 2018: Perth Redbacks
- 2019–2021: Joondalup Wolves
- 2020: Perth Lynx
- 2023–2025: Hobart Chargers

Career highlights
- WCC champion (2020); WCC Grand Final MVP (2020); 2× All-SBL / NBL1 West First Team (2018, 2021); SBL All-Star (2018); 2× QBL champion (2013, 2014); 2× First-team All-WCC (2011, 2012)
- Stats at Basketball Reference

Kayla Maria Steindl (née Standish; born November 19, 1989) is an American professional basketball player who last played for the Hobart Chargers of the NBL1 South. The Ellensburg, Washington native played four years of college basketball for Gonzaga before moving to Australia to play in the Women's National Basketball League (WNBL).

== College career ==
Steindl, a two-time All-West Coast Conference honoree, helped Gonzaga to its third-straight NCAA Tournament Sweet Sixteen appearance in 2011–12. She averaged a team-best 16.4 points, 7.5 rebounds and 1.5 blocks per game as a senior, while shooting an impressive 48.0 percent (214-of-446) from the field and 78.9 percent (127-of-161) at the charity stripe. She exploded in the 2012 post-season, averaging 23.2 points, 6.0 rebounds and 2.0 assists over the Zags' five games, including three NCAA Tournament contests. She shot 50.0 percent (43-of-86) from the field and 85.3 percent (29-of-34) at the free throw line.

Steindl closed out her Gonzaga career as the school's leader in games played (138) and blocks (176). She also stands fifth in the career record book for rebounds (809), seventh in both points (1,583) and field goal percentage (48.8), and eight in free throws made (289). Her numbers from the 2011–12 season also placed her in the Zag single-season record book. Her 50 blocks stands sixth; her 557 points, 214 field goals made and 127 free throws made all stand eight in their respective categories; and her 256 rebounds is tied for ninth.

Steindl helped Gonzaga to a 115–23 overall record in her four years, a 54–4 West Coast Conference record, four WCC regular-season titles, three WCC Tournament championships, an 8–4 NCAA Tournament record, two Sweet Sixteen appearances and Gonzaga's first-ever Elite Eight appearance. She earned both Associated Press and WBCA State Farm All-America honorable mention accolades in 2011–12 as a result.

=== College statistics ===
Legend
GP	Games played	GS	Games started	MPG	Minutes per game
FG%	Field goal percentage	3P%	3-point field goal percentage	FT%	Free throw percentage
RPG	Rebounds per game	APG	Assists per game	SPG	Steals per game
BPG	Blocks per game	PPG	Points per game	**Bold**	Career high

Year	Team	GP	FG%	3P%	FT%	RPG	APG	SPG	BPG	PPG
2008–09	Gonzaga	34	.302	.222	.757	2.9	0.5	0.8	0.5	3.9
2009–10	Gonzaga	34	.480	.189	.750	4.4	0.9	1.0	1.4	8.1
2010–11	Gonzaga	**36**	**.561**	**.375**	**.789**	**8.4**	1.2	1.3	**1.6**	17.1
2011–12	Gonzaga	34	.480	.111	.789	7.5	**1.6**	**1.4**	1.5	**16.4**
Career		138	.489	.225	.779	5.9	1.0	1.1	1.3	11.5

== Professional career ==
On April 16, 2012, Steindl was selected by the defending WNBA champion Minnesota Lynx with the 19th overall pick in the 2012 WNBA draft. She later moved to Australia and joined the Townsville Fire for the 2012–13 WNBL season. After a stint with the QBL's Mackay Meteorettes in 2013, she re-joined the Fire for the 2013–14 WNBL season. With the Fire, she played a key role in leading the team to successive WNBL Grand Finals, both of which resulted in runner-up finishes.

Steindl again played for the Mackay Meteorettes in 2014 and 2015 before returning to the WNBL for the 2015–16 season with the Adelaide Lightning.

After a stint with the Frankston Blues in 2016, Steindl returned to the Townsville Fire for the 2016–17 WNBL season.

For the 2017–18 WNBL season, Steindl joined the Perth Lynx. After playing for the Perth Redbacks in the 2018 State Basketball League season, she returned to the Lynx for the 2018–19 WNBL season.

Steindl played for the Joondalup Wolves in the 2019 State Basketball League season. In 2020, she helped the Wolves win the West Coast Classic title behind her grand final MVP performance. She then played for the Lynx in the 2020 WNBL Hub season in Queensland.

In 2021, Steindl re-joined the Joondalup Wolves and earned All-NBL1 West First Team honours.

In February 2023, Steindl signed with the Hobart Chargers of the NBL1 South for the 2023 season. She returned to the Chargers for the 2024 season and again for the 2025 season.

== Later Life ==
In August 2025, Steindl was appointed assistant general manager of the new Tasmanian WNBL team, the Tasmania Jewels.

Steindl went on to play Netball for the Kingston Blues in the 2026 season of the Tasmanian Netball League.

== National team career ==
Steindl was selected to represent Team USA at the 2011 Pan American Games in Guadalajara, Mexico. Team USA lost their first two games in close contests, before rebounding to win their next two games. Their 2–2 record earned them seventh-place finish. Steindl appeared in all four games and scored eight points.

== Personal life ==
Steindl's sister, Tami Willey, is also a professional basketball player. She too has played for Adelaide in the WNBL and with the Mackay Meteorettes in the QBL.

In 2018, she married NBL player Clint Steindl. The couple have two children.
