= List of NBL1 West champions =

The champion teams of the NBL1 West, formerly the State Basketball League (SBL), are determined annually by a grand final weekend hosted by Basketball Western Australia. All grand finals have been played in a one-game championship decider, except in 1995 when a best-of-three series was used. In 2010, the WA Basketball Centre hosted the grand finals for the first time. In 2024, the grand final host venue shifted to Perth Arena.

== Champions ==
=== Women ===
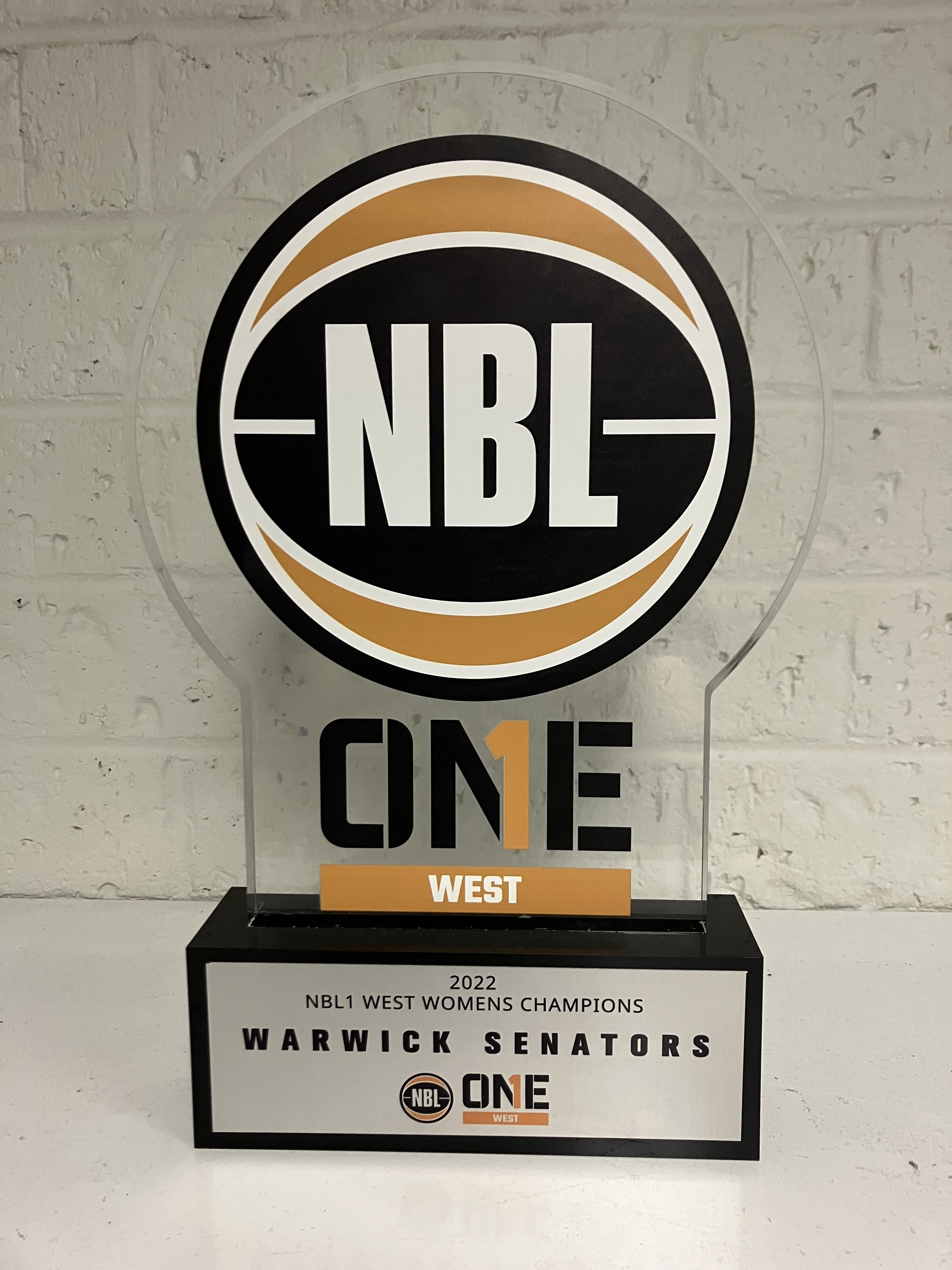
2022 NBL1 West Women's Championship Trophy

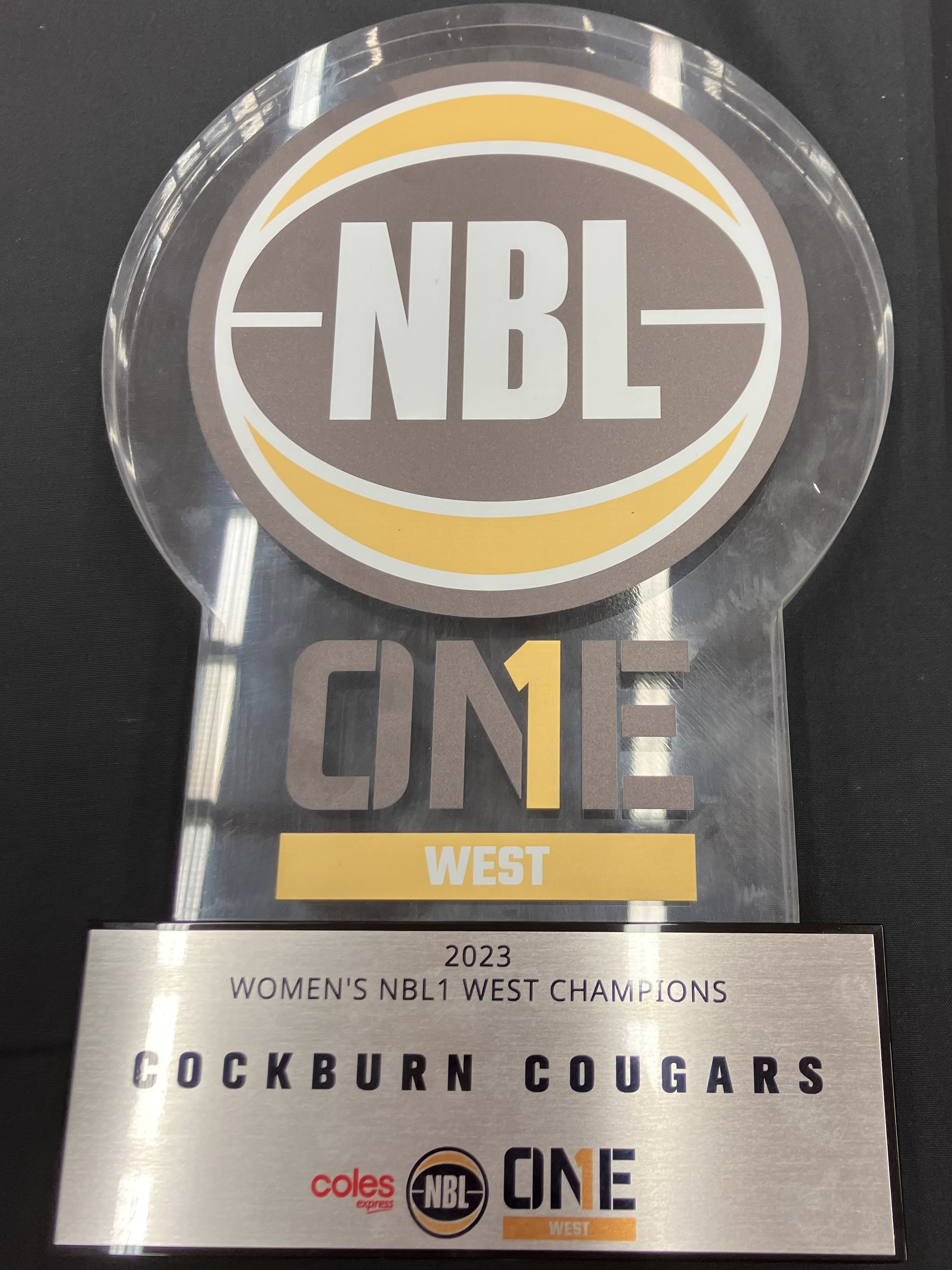
2023 NBL1 West Women's Championship Trophy

Year	Champion	Result	Runner-up
1989	Perth Redbacks	79 – 66	Perry Lakes Hawks
1990	Wanneroo Wolves	70 – 67	Stirling Senators
1991	Swan City Mustangs	79 – 66	Perth Redbacks
1992	Wanneroo Wolves	74 – 64	Swan City Mustangs
1993	Swan City Mustangs	68 – 51	Stirling Senators
1994	Stirling Senators	72 – 59	Perry Lakes Hawks
1995	Wanneroo Wolves	2 – 0 (83–49, 60–55)	Swan City Mustangs
1996	Swan City Mustangs	66 – 61	Willetton Tigers
1997	Willetton Tigers	62 – 52	Wanneroo Wolves
1998	Perry Lakes Hawks	71 – 63	Willetton Tigers
1999	Willetton Tigers	70 – 55	Perry Lakes Hawks
2000	Perth Redbacks	74 – 66	Perry Lakes Hawks
2001	Perry Lakes Hawks	74 – 58	Perth Redbacks
2002	Perry Lakes Hawks	84 – 55	Lakeside Lightning
2003	Perry Lakes Hawks	73 – 44	Mandurah Magic
2004	Willetton Tigers	61 – 46	Perry Lakes Hawks
2005	Willetton Tigers	59 – 54	Mandurah Magic
2006	Lakeside Lightning	56 – 53	Mandurah Magic
2007	Perry Lakes Hawks	66 – 40	Stirling Senators
2008	Perry Lakes Hawks	87 – 69	Willetton Tigers
2009	Willetton Tigers	73 – 63	Mandurah Magic
2010	Willetton Tigers	80 – 54	Perry Lakes Hawks
2011	Willetton Tigers	72 – 71	East Perth Eagles
2012	South West Slammers	85 – 48	Rockingham Flames
2013	Wanneroo Wolves	72 – 47	Kalamunda Eastern Suns
2014	Rockingham Flames	80 – 75	Lakeside Lightning
2015	Rockingham Flames	68 – 63	Willetton Tigers
2016	Willetton Tigers	60 – 58	Joondalup Wolves
2017	Perry Lakes Hawks	59 – 48	Mandurah Magic
2018	Lakeside Lightning	75 – 64	Mandurah Magic
2019	Rockingham Flames	85 – 56	Warwick Senators
2020	Season cancelled due to COVID-19 pandemic		
2021	Willetton Tigers	65 – 54	Joondalup Wolves
2022	Warwick Senators	87 – 61	Willetton Tigers
2023	Cockburn Cougars	68 – 61	Willetton Tigers
2024	Rockingham Flames	97 – 81	Cockburn Cougars
2025	Cockburn Cougars	91 – 71	Warwick Senators
2026	Warwick Senators	102 – 76	Cockburn Cougars

==== Results by teams ====
Team	Win	Loss	Total	Year(s) won	Year(s) lost
Tigers	9	6	15	1997, 1999, 2004, 2005, 2009, 2010, 2011, 2016, 2021	1996, 1998, 2008, 2015, 2022, 2023
Hawks	7	6	13	1998, 2001, 2002, 2003, 2007, 2008, 2017	1989, 1994, 1999, 2000, 2004, 2010
Wolves	4	3	7	1990, 1992, 1995, 2013	1997, 2016, 2021
Flames	4	1	5	2014, 2015, 2019, 2024	2012
Senators	3	5	8	1994, 2022, 2026	1990, 1993, 2007, 2019, 2025
Mustangs	3	2	5	1991, 1993, 1996	1992, 1995
Redbacks	2	2	4	1989, 2000	1991, 2001
Lightning	2	2	4	2006, 2018	2002, 2014
Cougars	2	2	4	2023, 2025	2024, 2026
Slammers	1	0	1	2012	—
Magic	0	6	6	—	2003, 2005, 2006, 2009, 2017, 2018
Eagles	0	1	1	—	2011
Suns	0	1	1	—	2013

=== Men ===
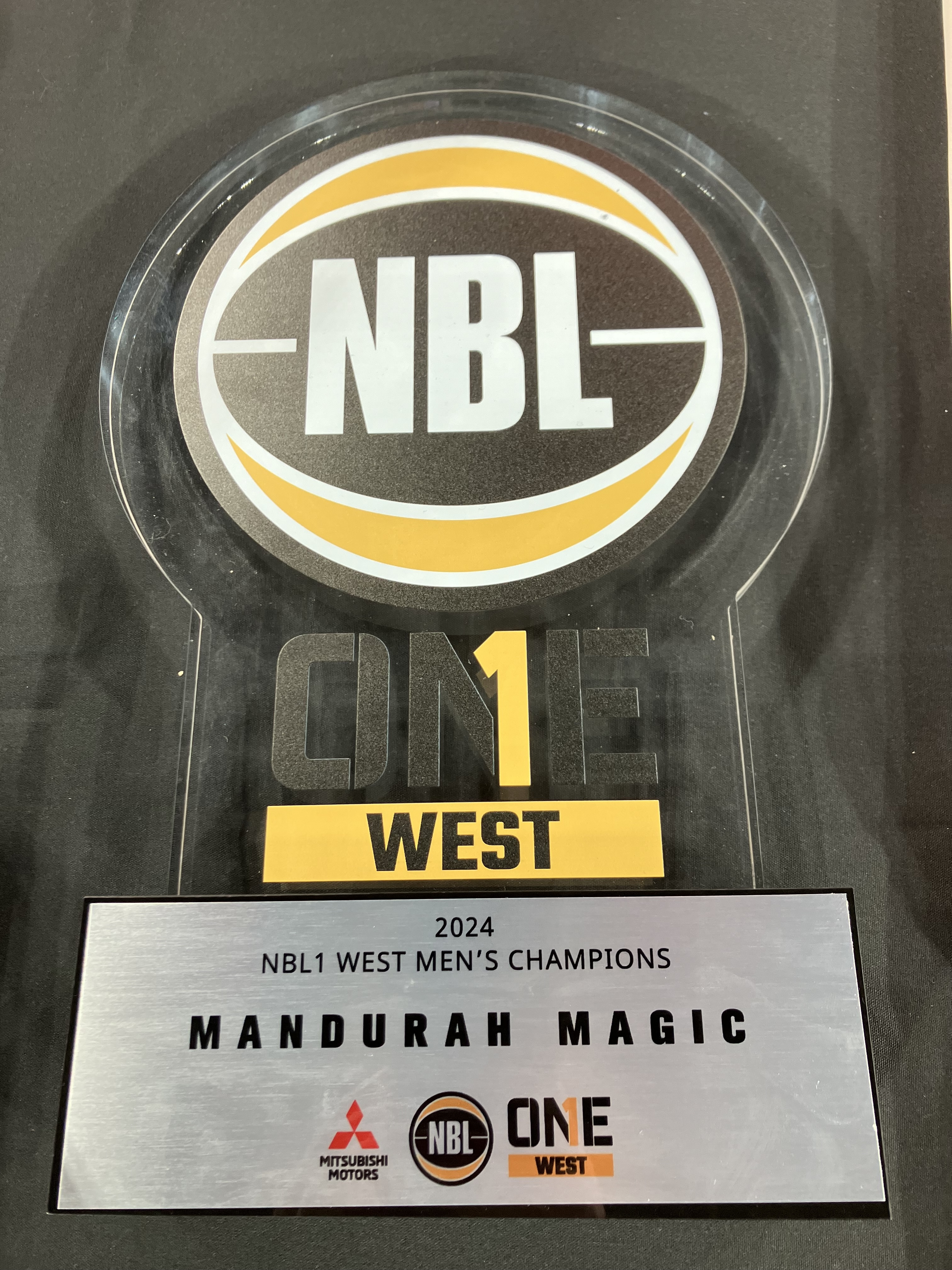
2024 NBL1 West Men's Championship Trophy

Year	Champion	Result	Runner-up
1989	Perth Redbacks	114 – 89	Geraldton Buccaneers
1990	Perth Redbacks	114 – 91	Stirling Senators
1991	Swan City Mustangs	123 – 120	Souwest Slammers
1992	Cockburn Cougars	107 – 94	Souwest Slammers
1993	Wanneroo Wolves	109 – 91	Cockburn Cougars
1994	Perry Lakes Hawks	107 – 86	Swan City Mustangs
1995	Bunbury City Slammers	2 – 0 (91–78, 88–86)	Goldfields Giants
1996	Bunbury City Slammers	103 – 86	Geraldton Buccaneers
1997	Perth Redbacks	94 – 92	Geraldton Buccaneers
1998	Bunbury City Slammers	105 – 96	Cockburn Cougars
1999	Bunbury City Slammers	89 – 73	Perth Redbacks
2000	Geraldton Buccaneers	96 – 76	Lakeside Lightning
2001	Perry Lakes Hawks	101 – 83	Geraldton Buccaneers
2002	Perry Lakes Hawks	101 – 97	Willetton Tigers
2003	Perry Lakes Hawks	76 – 72	Cockburn Cougars
2004	Perry Lakes Hawks	104 – 97	Goldfields Giants
2005	Lakeside Lightning	97 – 88	Perry Lakes Hawks
2006	Lakeside Lightning	83 – 66	Goldfields Giants
2007	Goldfields Giants	96 – 94	Lakeside Lightning
2008	Goldfields Giants	101 – 82	Willetton Tigers
2009	Lakeside Lightning	85 – 77	Perry Lakes Hawks
2010	Willetton Tigers	107 – 96	Lakeside Lightning
2011	Wanneroo Wolves	88 – 83	Perry Lakes Hawks
2012	Cockburn Cougars	105 – 72	East Perth Eagles
2013	Lakeside Lightning	77 – 74	Wanneroo Wolves
2014	East Perth Eagles	99 – 83	Geraldton Buccaneers
2015	Joondalup Wolves	105 – 75	South West Slammers
2016	Cockburn Cougars	96 – 84	Joondalup Wolves
2017	Perth Redbacks	103 – 70	Joondalup Wolves
2018	Perry Lakes Hawks	94 – 87	Joondalup Wolves
2019	Geraldton Buccaneers	92 – 80	Joondalup Wolves
2020	Season cancelled due to COVID-19 pandemic		
2021	Perry Lakes Hawks	92 – 82	Rockingham Flames
2022	Rockingham Flames	91 – 79	Geraldton Buccaneers
2023	Geraldton Buccaneers	86 – 80	Joondalup Wolves
2024	Mandurah Magic	91 – 89	Willetton Tigers
2025	Geraldton Buccaneers	81 – 78	Warwick Senators
2026	Rockingham Flames	66 – 62	Geraldton Buccaneers

==== Results by teams ====
Team	Win	Loss	Total	Year(s) won	Year(s) lost
Hawks	7	3	10	1994, 2001, 2002, 2003, 2004, 2018, 2021	2005, 2009, 2011
Buccaneers	4	7	11	2000, 2019, 2023, 2025	1989, 1996, 1997, 2001, 2014, 2022, 2026
Slammers	4	3	7	1995, 1996, 1998, 1999	1991, 1992, 2015
Lightning	4	3	7	2005, 2006, 2009, 2013	2000, 2007, 2010
Redbacks	4	1	5	1989, 1990, 1997, 2017	1999
Wolves	3	6	9	1993, 2011, 2015	2013, 2016, 2017, 2018, 2019, 2023
Cougars	3	3	6	1992, 2012, 2016	1993, 1998, 2003
Giants	2	3	5	2007, 2008	1995, 2004, 2006
Flames	2	1	3	2022, 2026	2021
Tigers	1	3	4	2010	2002, 2008, 2024
Mustangs	1	1	2	1991	1994
Eagles	1	1	2	2014	2012
Magic	1	0	1	2024	–
Senators	0	2	2	—	1990, 2025

== Historical records ==
=== Past trophies ===
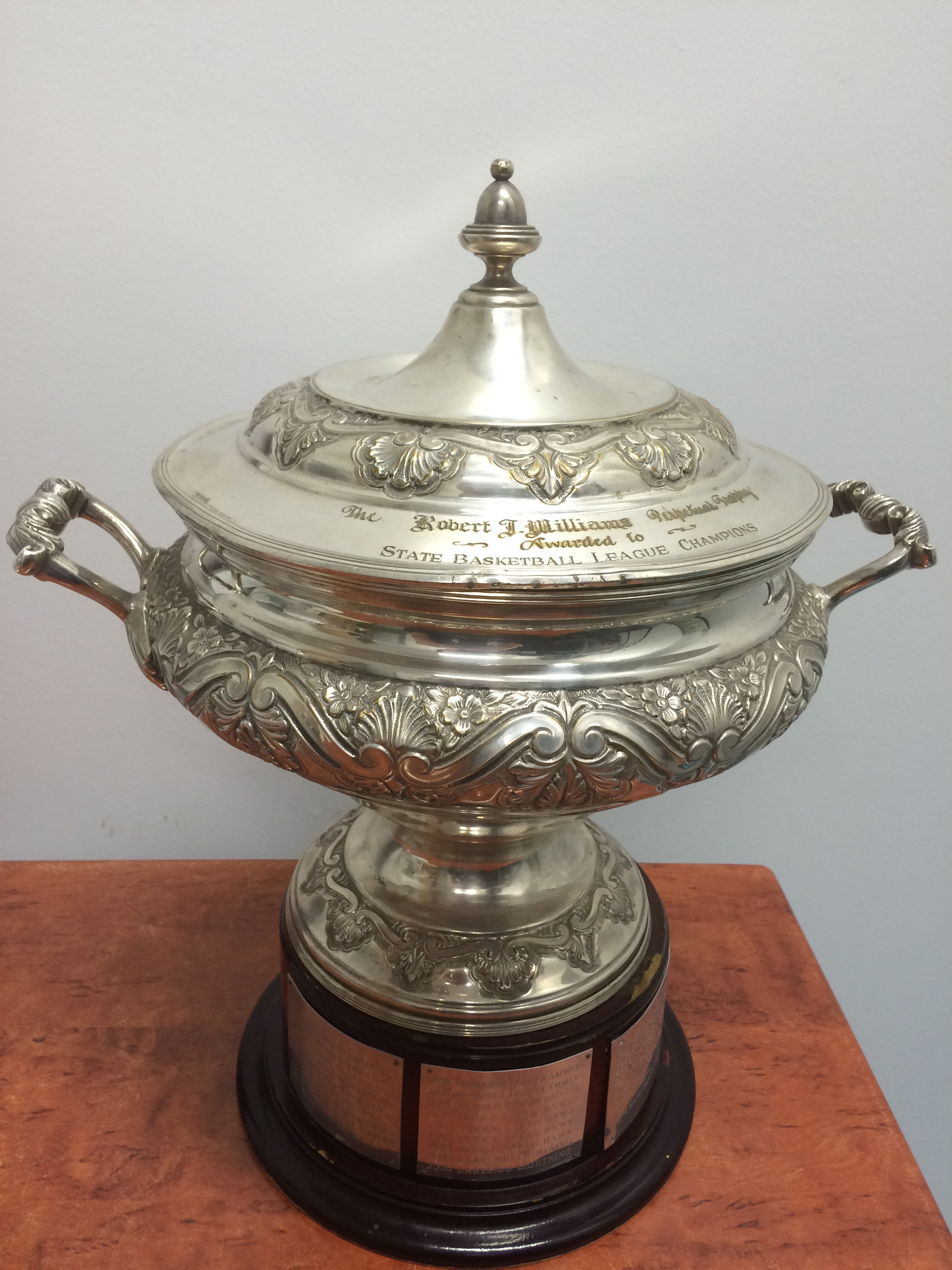
The Robert J Williams Perpetual Trophy for MSBL champions

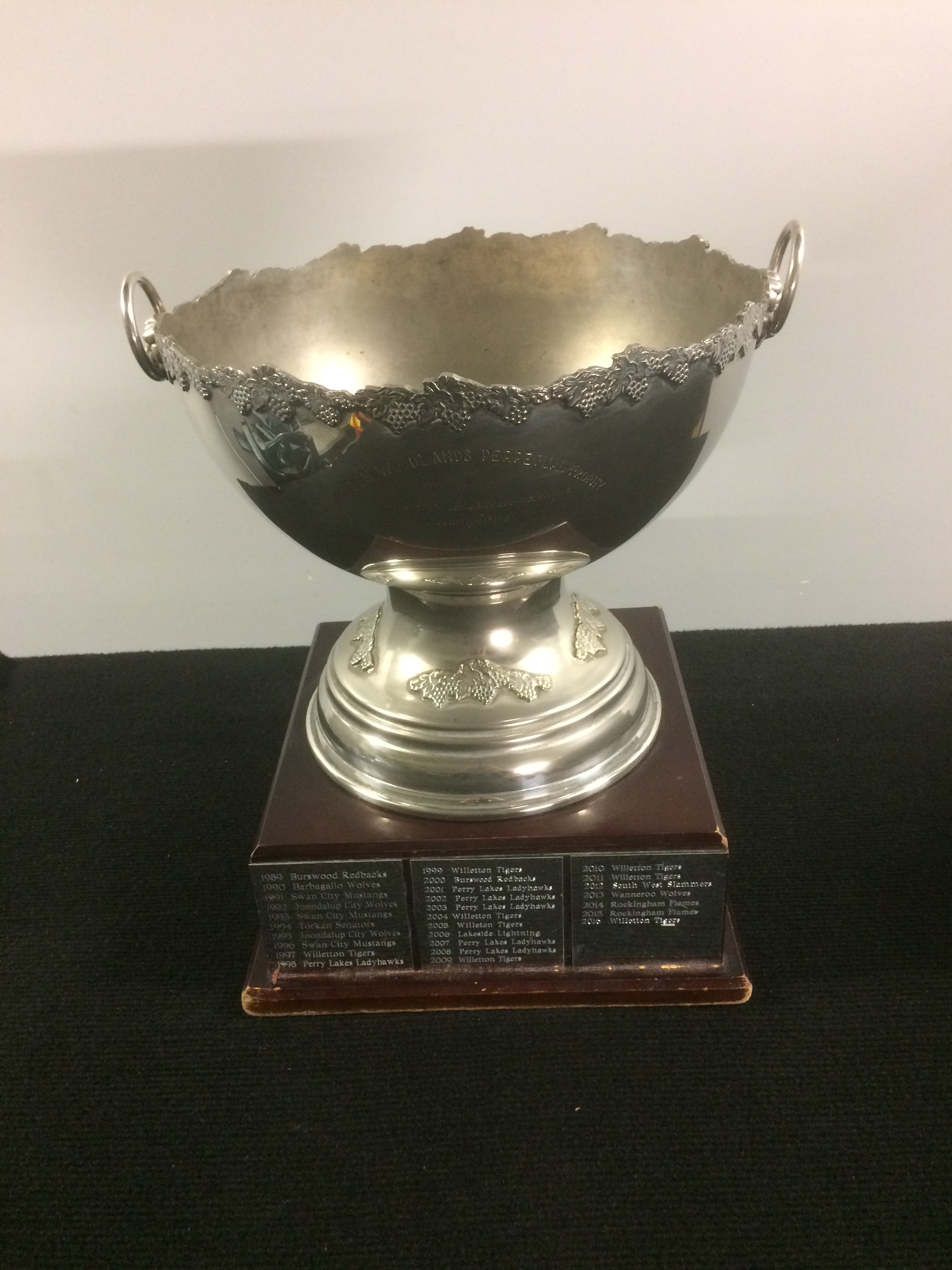
The Len Woodlands Perpetual Trophy for WSBL champions

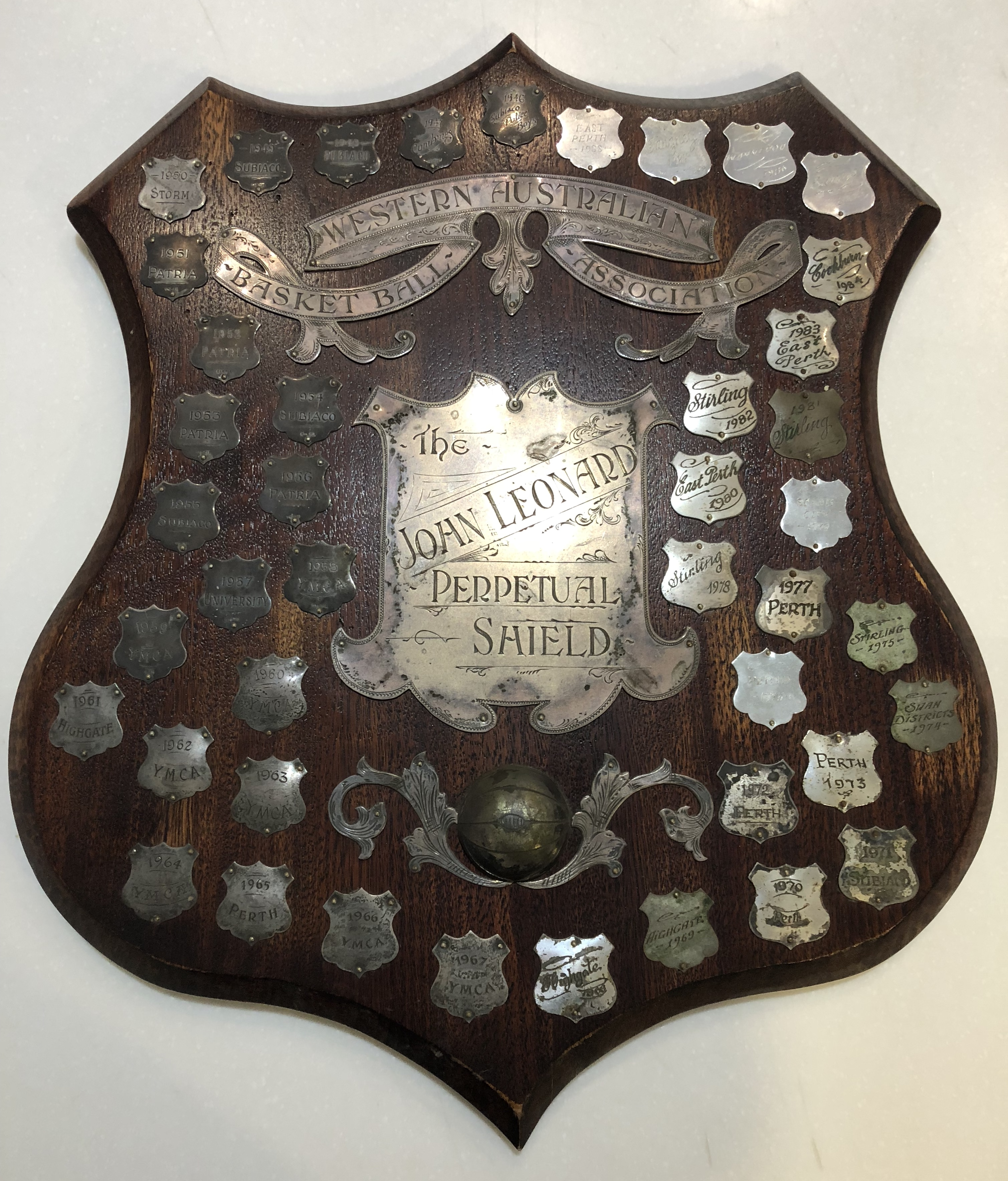
The John Leonard Perpetual Shield for men's champions 1946–1988

=== Pre-SBL ===
Year	Men's Result	Women's Result	Ref
1972	Perth (scores unavailable)	N/A	
1973	Perth (scores unavailable)	N/A	
1974	Swan Districts 80 d Stirling 67	Stirling 65 d Melville 38	
1975	Stirling 69 d Perth 68	Perth 55 d Melville 43	
1976	Perth d Stirling (scores unavailable)	Melville d East Perth (scores unavailable)	
1977	Perth 80 d Scarborough City 78	East Perth 76 d Stirling 56	
1978	Stirling 69 d Melville 65	East Perth 53 d Swan Districts 47	
1979	Scarborough City 96 d Stirling 87	East Perth 59 d Subiaco 46	
1980	East Perth 80 d Stirling 67	East Perth 52 d Subiaco 45	
1981	Stirling 78 d Scarborough City 62	Stirling 61 d East Perth 57	
1982	Stirling 112 d Cockburn 96	Swan Districts 63 d Stirling 62	
1983	East Perth 86 d Stirling 84	Swan Districts 61 d Cockburn 54	
1984	Cockburn 86 d Perth 78	Stirling 59 d Cockburn 53	
1985	Swan Districts 86 d East Perth 71	Stirling 54 d Cockburn 53	
1986	Wanneroo 103 d East Perth 78	Wanneroo 63 d Cockburn 55	
1987	Tangney 99 d Stirling 88	Tangney 71 d Stirling 61	
1988	East Perth 84 d Wanneroo 71	Stirling 80 d Tangney 60	
