= Perry Lakes Hawks =

- Leagues: NBL1 West
- Founded: 1989
- History: Perry Lakes Hawks; 1989–present
- Arena: Bendat Basketball Centre
- Location: Floreat, Western Australia
- Team colors: Blue & white
- CEO: Corey Ranger
- Chairman: Blake Whitby (interim)
- Head coach: M: Ben Peterson; W: Marcus Embury
- Championships: 14
- Website: NBL1.com.au

Perry Lakes Hawks is an NBL1 West club based in Perth, Western Australia. The club fields a team in both the Men's and Women's NBL1 West. The club is a division of Perry Lakes Basketball Association (PLBA), the major administrative basketball organisation in Perth's western suburbs. The Hawks play their home games at Bendat Basketball Centre.

== Club history ==
=== Background ===
Perry Lakes Basketball Association was established in 1973 as Scarborough City District Basketball Club. It was formed from the amalgamation of three 'Metropolitan' clubs from the Claremont district: City Beach, Claremont and Scarborough. Scarborough City played out of Perry Lakes Basketball Stadium and competed in the Western Australian Basketball Federation's (WABF) District Competition. The men's A Grade team reached the grand final in 1977, 1979 and 1981, finishing as runners-up in their first and third tries while claiming their first premiership in 1979.

=== SBL / NBL1 West ===
1989 saw the formation of the State Basketball League (SBL) with both a men's and women's competition. Perry Lakes, trading as the Hawks, entered a team into both the Men's SBL and Women's SBL. Both teams had strong inaugural seasons, with the men finishing in second place with a 19–3 record and the women earning the minor premiership with a first-place finish and a 15–6 record. The women went on to reach the inaugural WSBL Grand Final, where they lost 79–66 to the Perth Redbacks.

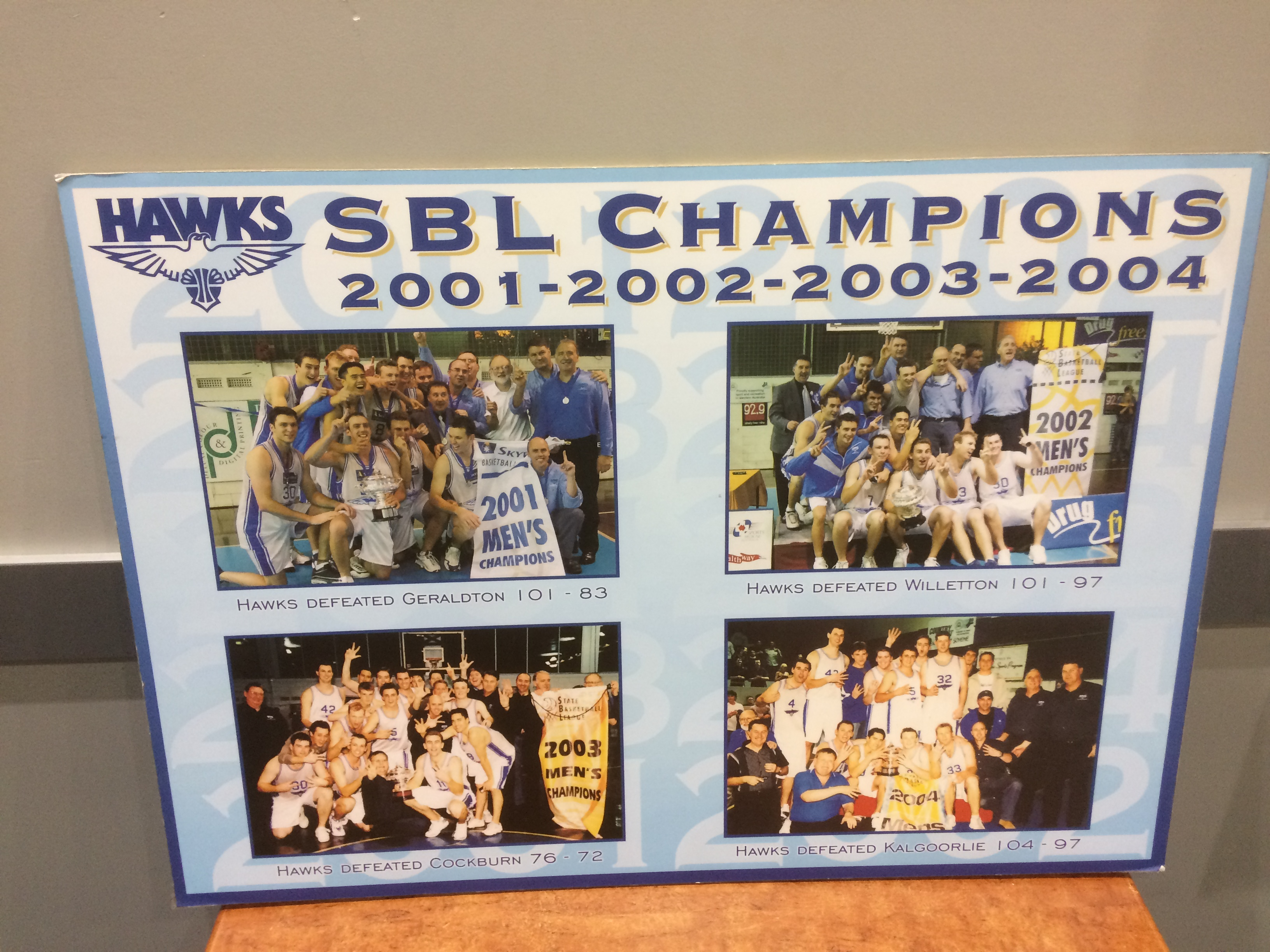
Men's championship four-peat commemorative plaque

In 1994, both teams reached the grand final. The women were defeated by the Stirling Senators, while the men claimed their maiden MSBL championship with a 107–86 win over the Swan City Mustangs. The women claimed their first championship in 1998. Between 1998 and 2004, they played in every WSBL Grand Final, including winning three in a row between 2001 and 2003. In a similar dominant era for the men, the Hawks competed in five straight MSBL Grand Finals between 2001 and 2005, as they claimed a four-peat between 2001 and 2004 under coach John Gardiner. In 2007 and 2008, the women claimed back-to-back championships.

In 2009, the Hawks returned to the MSBL Grand Final but fell short of their sixth championship with an 85–77 loss to the Lakeside Lightning. Grand final appearances followed for the women in 2010 and the men again in 2011. In 2012, both teams missed the finals for the first time in two decades.

In 2017, the women returned to the WSBL Grand Final. They defeated the Mandurah Magic 59–48 to win their seventh championship. Toni Farnworth took out the Grand Final MVP award for her 26 points.

In 2018, the men returned to the MSBL Grand Final. They defeated the Joondalup Wolves 94–87 to win their sixth championship. Ben Purser was named Grand Final MVP for his 12 points, 10 rebounds and game-high eight assists.

In 2020, both teams reached the grand final in the West Coast Classic.

In 2021, the SBL was rebranded as NBL1 West. The Hawks men were crowned minor premiers in the inaugural NBL1 West season and reached their 10th SBL / NBL1 West grand final, where they defeated the Rockingham Flames 92–82 to win their seventh championship. Andrew Ferguson was named Grand Final MVP for his 18 points and 15 rebounds.

== Accolades ==
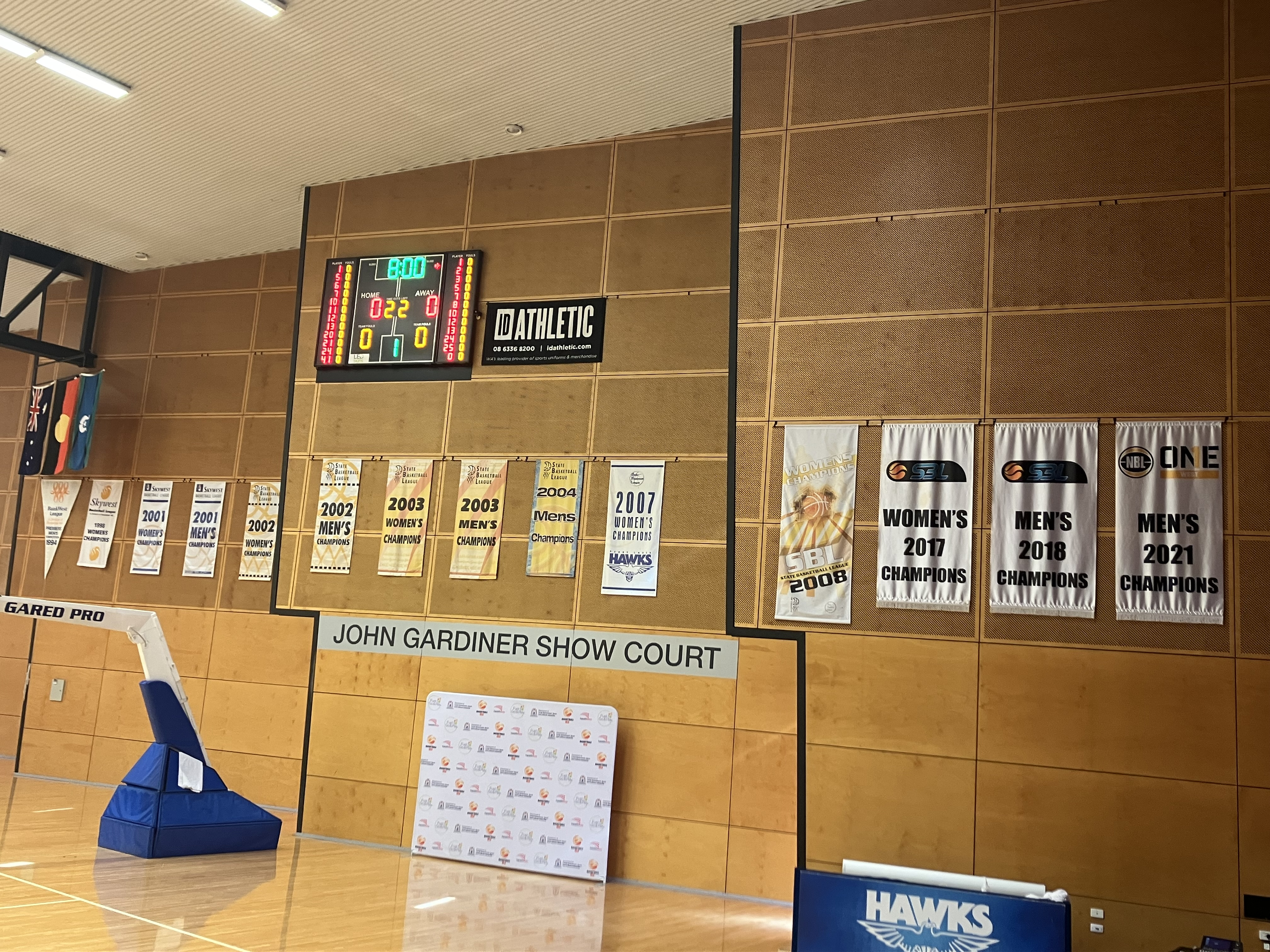
The Hawks' 14 SBL/NBL1 championship banners hanging at Bendat Basketball Centre, July 2024

Women

- Championships: 7 (1998, 2001, 2002, 2003, 2007, 2008, 2017)
- Grand Final appearances: 13 (1989, 1994, 1998, 1999, 2000, 2001, 2002, 2003, 2004, 2007, 2008, 2010, 2017)
- Minor premierships: 8 (1989, 1997, 2000, 2001, 2002, 2003, 2009, 2017)

Men

- Championships: 7 (1994, 2001, 2002, 2003, 2004, 2018, 2021)
- Grand Final appearances: 10 (1994, 2001, 2002, 2003, 2004, 2005, 2009, 2011, 2018, 2021)
- Minor premierships: 8 (1994, 1995, 2001, 2002, 2003, 2005, 2008, 2021)
