= Lakeside Lightning =

Australian basketball club

- Leagues: NBL1 West
- Founded: 2000
- History: Men: Lakeside Lightning; 2000–present Women: Lakeside Lightning; 2001–present
- Arena: Lakeside Recreation Centre
- Location: North Lake, Western Australia
- Team colors: Purple & white
- President: Jarrad Prue
- General manager: Jake Breytenbach
- Head coach: M: Steve Bezant; W: Craig Mansfield
- Championships: 6
- Website: NBL1.com.au

Lakeside Lightning is an NBL1 West club based in Perth, Western Australia. The club fields a team in both the Men's and Women's NBL1 West. The club is owned and managed by Lakeside Baptist Church. The Lightning play their home games at Lakeside Recreation Centre.

== Club history ==
=== Background ===
The Lakeside Recreation Centre was opened in 1992. The first Lakeside Lightning junior teams competed at the Basketball WA Championships in 1993, which was followed by junior teams entering the Western Australian Basketball League (WABL) for the first time in 1995.

=== SBL / NBL1 West ===
The Lakeside Lightning men's team debuted in the State Basketball League (SBL) in 2000. They finished their inaugural season in third place on the Sky Conference ladder with a 12–7 record and advanced through to the MSBL Grand Final, where they were defeated 96–76 by the Geraldton Buccaneers.

In 2001, the Lakeside Lightning women's team debuted in the SBL. In 2002, the women's team finished the regular season in fourth place with a 15–7 record and advanced through to the WSBL Grand Final, where they were defeated 84–55 by the Perry Lakes Hawks.

In 2005, the men's team reached the MSBL Grand Final, where they defeated the Perry Lakes Hawks 97–88 in overtime to win their first championship. American forward Andy Gilbert was named grand final MVP for his 36 points.

In 2006, both teams made grand final appearances, with the club claiming an SBL championship double. In the WSBL Grand Final, the Lightning defeated the Mandurah Magic 56–53 behind a grand final MVP performance from American guard-forward Kristi Channing. Channing had 22 points in the win. In the MSBL Grand Final, the Lightning defeated the Goldfields Giants 83–66 behind a grand final MVP performance from American guard Ben Earle. Earle had 32 points in the win.

In 2007, the men won their first ever minor premiership after finishing the regular season in first place with a 20–4 record. They went on to reach their third straight MSBL Grand Final, where they were defeated 96–94 by the Goldfields Giants.

In 2009, the men won their second minor premiership after finishing the regular season in first place with a 22–4 record. They went on to reach their fourth MSBL Grand Final in five years, where they defeated the Hawks 85–77 behind a grand final MVP performance from American guard Luke Payne. Payne had 29 points in the win.

In 2010, the men won their third minor premiership after finishing the regular season in first place with a 21–5 record. They went on to reach their fifth MSBL Grand Final in six years, where they were defeated 107–96 by the Willetton Tigers despite Luke Payne's team-high 22 points.

In 2011, the men failed to reach the grand final despite claiming their third straight minor premiership with a team-best 24–2 record. During the year, they had an 18-game winning streak.

In 2013, the men won their fifth minor premiership in seven years after finishing the regular season in first place with a 23–3 record. They advanced to their seventh MSBL Grand Final, where they defeated the Wanneroo Wolves 77–74 behind a grand final MVP performance from American forward Justin Cecil. Cecil had 25 points and seven rebounds in helping the Lightning claim their fourth MSBL championship.

Following the 2013 season, inaugural head coach Andy Stewart parted ways with the Lightning after 14 seasons in charge of the men's team. During this time, he also had stints as head coach of the Lightning women's team in 2003, 2004, 2009 and 2010.

In 2014, the women's team advanced through to their first WSBL Grand Final since 2006, where they were defeated by the Rockingham Flames 80–75.

In 2015, the women's team went from grand finalists to wooden spooners after winning just one game to be clear on the bottom of the standings. The men's team also had their 13-year finals run ended in 2015.

In 2018, the women's team finished the regular season in first place and a 21–1 record and went on to reach their fourth WSBL Grand Final, where they defeated the Mandurah Magic 75–64 to win their second championship. In the last five minutes, the Lightning came from 10 points behind to score the last 21 points of the match. American guard Alison Schwagmeyer was named grand final MVP for her 25 points, seven rebounds and three assists.

In 2021, the SBL was rebranded as NBL1 West.

== Accolades ==
Lakeside Lightning championship banners, May 2026

Women

- Championships: 2 (2006, 2018)
- Grand Final appearances: 4 (2002, 2006, 2014, 2018)
- Minor premierships: 2 (2018, 2019)

Men

- Championships: 4 (2005, 2006, 2009, 2013)
- Grand Final appearances: 7 (2000, 2005, 2006, 2007, 2009, 2010, 2013)
- Minor premierships: 5 (2007, 2009, 2010, 2011, 2013)
