= Klara Wischer =

Australian basketball player (born 1991)

No. 12 – Sandringham Sabres
- Position: Forward
- League: NBL1 South

Personal information
- Born: 9 April 1991 (age 35) Melbourne, Victoria, Australia
- Listed height: 190 cm (6 ft 3 in)

Career information
- High school: Methodist Ladies' College (Melbourne, Victoria)
- College: Cloud County CC (2009–2011); San Diego (2011–2013)
- WNBA draft: 2013: undrafted
- Playing career: 2014–present

Career history
- 2014–2015: Hobart Chargers
- 2015–2016: Perth Lynx
- 2016–2017: Joondalup Wolves
- 2018: Hobart Chargers
- 2019: Kilsyth Cobras
- 2021–2022: Knox Raiders
- 2023–present: Sandringham Sabres
- 2023–2024: Southside Flyers

Career highlights
- WNBL champion (2024); NBL1 champion (2019); SBL All-Star Five (2016); 2× SBL All-Star (2016, 2017); SBL All-Star Game MVP (2016); Third-team NJCAA D1 All-America (2011)

Klara Wischer (born 9 April 1991) is an Australian professional basketball player for the Sandringham Sabres of the NBL1 South. She played two seasons of college basketball in the United States for the San Diego Toreros before debuting in the Women's National Basketball League (WNBL) for the Perth Lynx in 2015. After many seasons in the Australian state leagues, she returned to the WNBL in 2023 with the Southside Flyers.

== Early life ==
Born and raised in Melbourne, Victoria, Wischer attended Methodist Ladies' College and played as a junior for the Nunawading Spectres.

== College career ==
In 2009, Wischer moved to the United States to play college basketball for Cloud County Community College. As a freshman at Could County in 2009–10, she averaged 4.9 points and 3.5 rebounds per game. As a sophomore in 2010–11, she averaged 12.1 points per game to go with her team-leading 8.6 rebounding average as she helped lead the Thunderbirds to a 27–9 overall record. Competing in all 36 contests, she also led the team in blocks (64) and steals (128) while dishing off a respectable 130 assists. She helped the Thunderbirds win the 2011 Region VI Championship, subsequently earning first-team NJCAA All-Region VI honours, as well as being named to the NJCAA D1 All-America third team. She also earned Region VI All-Tournament Team honours, and was named to the league's All-Academic Team.

Following her sophomore season at Could County, Wischer transferred to the University of San Diego, where as a junior in 2011–12, she played in all 35 games for the Toreros and made two starts at the forward position. She helped the team record a program-best 24–9 overall record with her 3.7 points, 4.3 rebounds and 1.0 assists per game.

As a senior at San Diego in 2012–13, Wischer averaged 7.7 points, a team-high 6.9 rebounds, 3.2 assists and 1.7 steals in 32 games (all starts).

== Professional career ==
=== Hobart Chargers (2014–2015) ===
On 28 November 2013, Wischer signed with the Hobart Chargers for the 2014 SEABL season. She helped the Chargers win the SEABL South Conference title, but despite her 10-point effort in the SEABL National Championship game, the Chargers were defeated 75–59 by the Brisbane Spartans. In 26 games for the Chargers in 2014, Wischer averaged 9.3 points, 6.7 rebounds and 2.1 assists per game.

On 18 December 2014, Wischer re-signed with the Chargers for the 2015 SEABL season. On 13 June 2015, she recorded a career-high 32 points and 12 rebounds in a win over the Canberra Capitals. In 23 games for the Chargers in 2015, Wischer averaged 15.8 points, 8.9 rebounds and 2.0 assists per game.

=== Perth Lynx (2015–2016) ===
On 3 June 2015, Wischer signed with the Perth Lynx for the 2015–16 WNBL season. She appeared in all nine games to begin the season before missing a two-game Queensland road trip in late November due to sickness. She missed a third straight game on 4 December after earning no court time in a two-point loss to the Dandenong Rangers. She went on to receive court time in the team's next two games. She played in three of the team's next four games, where on 9 January 2016, she scored a season-high 10 points in an 89–63 road win over the Canberra Capitals. She then played in five of the team's final six games of the regular season, helping the Lynx finish in second place with a 16–8 record. The Lynx went on to defeat the first-seeded Townsville Fire in the semi-finals, thus advancing to the WNBL Grand Final for the first time since 1999. In the best-of-three championship series against Townsville, the Lynx were defeated 2–0. Wischer saw court time in the Lynx's semi-final game, and in first game of the grand final series. She appeared in 21 of the team's 27 games in 2015–16, averaging 2.7 points and 2.0 rebounds per game.

=== Joondalup Wolves (2016–2017) ===
Following the conclusion of the 2015–16 WNBL season, Wischer joined the Joondalup Wolves for the 2016 State Basketball League season. In her debut for the Wolves on 24 March 2016, she recorded team highs of 29 points and 14 rebounds in an 89–79 loss to the Rockingham Flames. For her 28 points, 15 rebounds, 8 assists, 3 steals and 3 blocks in week seven against the South West Slammers, Wischer was named SBL Player of the Week. On 19 May, she was named a starter on the SBL North All-Stars team. On 6 June, she recorded 17 points and 8 rebounds for the North All-Stars in a 93–70 win over the South. She subsequently earned All-Star Game MVP honours. On 6 July, she was named Player of the Week for Round 16 after averaging 18.5 points over two games, resulting in two wins. On 19 July, she recorded season highs of 31 points and 17 rebounds against the Kalamunda Eastern Suns. Wischer helped the Wolves win the minor premiership with a first-place finish and a 19–3 record. The Wolves went on to reach the SBL Grand Final, where they were defeated 60–58 by the Willetton Tigers despite a 20-point, 13-rebound effort from Wischer. She appeared in 27 of the team's 28 games in 2016, totalling 490 points at 18.1 per game, with 9.89 rebounds and 4.33 assists per game. She subsequently earned SBL All-Star Five honours.

On 24 October 2016, Wischer re-signed with the Wolves for the 2017 season. In her season debut on 1 April 2017, she recorded 35 points and 11 rebounds against the Rockingham Flames. On 20 May, she recorded 22 points and a season-high 18 rebounds against the Willetton Tigers. The Wolves finished the regular season in sixth place with a 12–10 record, and went on to lose 2–0 to the Lakeside Lightning in the quarter-finals. She appeared in 21 of the team's 24 games in 2017, totalling 372 points at 17.7 per game.

=== Return to Hobart (2018) ===
On 6 December 2017, Wischer signed with the Hobart Chargers for the 2018 SEABL season, returning to the club for a second stint. She missed nearly two months of the season after injuring her knee against the Sandringham Sabres in late April. On 15 July, she scored a season-high 37 points against the Dandenong Rangers. The Chargers missed the playoffs with a ninth-place finish and a 10–10 record. In 13 games, she averaged 11.7 points, 5.5 rebounds and 2.0 assists per game.

=== Kilsyth Cobras (2019) ===
On 14 February 2019, Wischer signed with the Kilsyth Cobras of the NBL1 for the 2019 season. She helped the Cobras reach the grand final, where she had 16 points, five rebounds and three assists in an 86–76 win over the Geelong Supercats. In 23 games, she averaged 13.2 points, 7.9 rebounds, 3.4 assists and 1.7 steals per game.

=== Knox Raiders (2021–2022) ===
On 12 March 2021, Wischer signed with the Knox Raiders of the NBL1 South for the 2021 season.

Wischer returned to the Raiders for the 2022 season.

=== Sandringham Sabres and Southside Flyers (2023–present) ===
In October 2022, Wischer signed with the Sandringham Sabres for the 2023 NBL1 South season.

In September 2023, Wischer signed with the Southside Flyers for the 2023–24 WNBL season.

Wischer returned to the Sandringham Sabres for the 2024 season and was the NBL1 South's leading rebounder.

With the Sabres in the 2025 NBL1 South season, Wischer averaged 12.0 points, 8.0 rebounds, 3.39 assists and 1.78 steals per game.

Wischer re-joined the Sabres for the 2026 season.
