= Jordan Swing =

American basketball player (born 1990)

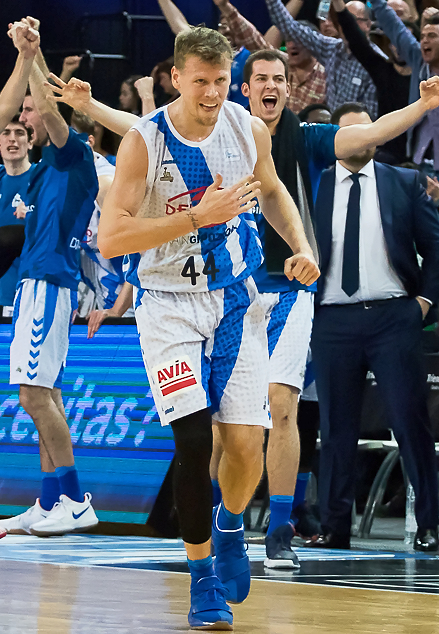
- Swing with Gipuzkoa Basket in 2018

Personal information
- Born: December 31, 1990 (age 35) Memphis, Tennessee, U.S.
- Listed height: 6 ft 6 in (1.98 m)
- Listed weight: 200 lb (91 kg)

Career information
- High school: Vestavia Hills (Vestavia Hills, Alabama)
- College: Western Kentucky (2009–2010); UAB (2011–2014)
- NBA draft: 2014: undrafted
- Playing career: 2014–present
- Position: Shooting guard / small forward

Career history
- 2014–2015: Canton Charge
- 2015: Lakeside Lightning
- 2015–2016: Oviedo CB
- 2016: CAI Zaragoza
- 2016–2017: Limburg United
- 2017–2018: Gipuzkoa Basket
- 2018–2019: Hapoel Be'er Sheva
- 2019–2020: Maccabi Rishon LeZion
- 2020: Maccabi Haifa
- 2020–2021: Hamburg Towers
- 2021: Soles de Mexicali
- 2021–2022: BC Kyiv
- 2022: Birmingham Squadron
- 2022: Grises de Humacao
- 2022–2023: Birmingham Squadron
- 2024: Carplus Fuenlabrada
- 2024: Soles de Mexicali
- 2025: Birmingham Squadron

Career highlights
- SBL All-Star Five (2015); Israeli League All-Star (2019)

Jordan Tyler Swing (born December 31, 1990) is an American professional basketball player who last played for the Birmingham Squadron of the NBA G League. He played college basketball for Western Kentucky and UAB before playing professionally in the NBA G League, Australia, Spain, Belgium, Israel, Germany, Mexico, Ukraine and Puerto Rico.

== High school career ==
Swing attended Vestavia Hills High School in Vestavia Hills, Alabama where he played for coach George Hatchett. As a sophomore playing for the Rebels in 2006–07, he averaged 13 points, six rebounds and four assists per game. As a junior in 2007–08, he averaged 19 points, eight rebounds and three assists per game in earning third-team all-state honors.

On November 13, 2008, Swing signed a National Letter of Intent to play college basketball for Western Kentucky University.

As a senior playing for Vestavia Hills in 2008–09, Swing averaged 19 points, nine rebounds and six assists per game, and led his team to a 28–8 record, including scoring 33 points in the championship game as the Rebels won the Alabama 6A state title. He was subsequently selected as the MVP of the regional and state tournament finals, as well as first-team all-state honoree. To cap off his senior campaign, he was selected as the Gatorade Alabama Player of the Year ahead of front runners Eric Bledsoe and DeMarcus Cousins. The Birmingham News also named Swing as its State Player of the Year.

== College career ==
As a freshman at Western Kentucky in 2009–10, Swing played in 22 games and averaged 2.3 points and 1.1 rebounds in 7.6 minutes per game. On February 18, 2010, he scored a season-high 11 points against South Alabama.

On June 30, 2010, it was announced that Swing would not return to the Western Kentucky for the 2010–11 season. Two weeks later, he returned home to Alabama, transferring to UAB and subsequently sitting out the 2010–11 season due to NCAA transfer regulations.

As a redshirted sophomore playing for the UAB Blazers in 2011–12, Swing stepped right in and made an immediate impact, playing in 28 contests while making 24 starts at a variety of positions including point guard, shooting guard and small forward. He was the team's leading returning scorer (11.2 ppg) and three-point shooter (38.7 percent), and finished the year ranked fourth in Conference USA in three-point shooting percentage and was third in the league in conference games only (42.6). He missed three games between January 25 and February 1 due to a broken right (non-shooting) hand he suffered against UCF on January 21. A month after returning to action, he scored a season-high 22 points, including four three-pointers, in the win over Tulsa on February 29.

As a junior in 2012–13, Swing scored in double figures in 26 of 33 games, and was the team's second-leading scorer with 14.0 points per game. He scored a career-high 24 points, including the game tying basket to send the game into overtime against UTEP on January 30.

In August 2013, Swing participated in the Athletes In Action basketball tour to Lithuania. As a senior in 2013–14, Swing played in 31 games for the Blazers and started in 22 of them. During the season, he scored a season-high 17 points against Chattanooga on December 18, and hit the 1,000 career point mark on February 27 in a 61–60 win over Rice. He finished the season averaging the lowest numbers of his three-year career at UAB, recording 6.0 points, 3.5 rebounds and 2.0 assists in 21.8 minutes per game.

=== College statistics ===
Year	Team	GP	GS	MPG	FG%	3P%	FT%	RPG	APG	SPG	BPG	PPG
2009–10	Western Kentucky	22	0	7.6	.367	.208	.750	1.1	.1	.2	.1	2.3
2011–12	UAB	28	24	31.2	.390	.387	.845	3.9	1.8	.5	.2	11.2
2012–13	UAB	33	26	30.5	.467	.359	.788	5.8	2.7	1.3	.4	14.0
2013–14	UAB	31	22	21.8	.373	.244	.696	3.5	2.0	.7	.2	6.0
Career		114	72	23.9	.418	.333	.785	3.8	1.8	.7	.2	8.9

== Professional career ==
=== Canton Charge (2014–2015) ===
After going undrafted in the 2014 NBA draft, Swing tried out for the Canton Charge of the NBA Development League. He subsequently joined the Charge for the 2014–15 season. He made his debut for the Charge on November 15 in the team's season-opening game, recording 12 points and 4 steals off the bench in a 109–106 triple-overtime loss to the Delaware 87ers. He was waived by the team on January 14, 2015. In 11 games, he averaged 4.0 points on .455 shooting with 1.8 rebounds and 0.8 assists in 13.8 minutes per game.

=== Lakeside Lightning (2015) ===
Swing joined the Lakeside Lightning of the State Basketball League (SBL) in Australia for the 2025 season. During the season, he earned Player of the Week honors for Round 8 and participated in the SBL All-Star Game. The Lightning finished the season in 12th place with a 9–17 record. He appeared in all 26 games, averaging 27.2 points, 8.1 rebounds, 4.8 assists, 1.8 steals and 1.0 blocks per game, earning himself All-Star Five honors at the season's end.

=== Spain (2015–2016) ===
On August 14, 2015, Swing signed with Unión Financiera Baloncesto Oviedo of the Spanish LEB Oro. On December 5, 2015, he scored a season-high 42 points in a win over Leyma Básquet Coruña.

In January 2025, Swing left Oviedo and signed with CAI Zaragoza of the Liga ACB, the top division in Spain. In 16 games for Oviedo, he averaged 17.8 points, 4.5 rebounds, 2.4 assists and 1.5 steals per game. On January 27, he had his best game for Zaragoza, scoring 13 points in 20 minutes of Eurocup action against Dinamo Basket Sassari. In 14 league games for Zaragoza, he averaged 3.1 points and 1.8 rebounds per game. He also appeared in six Eurocup games, averaging 4.2 points and 1.0 rebounds per game.

=== Limburg United (2016–2017) ===
On August 15, 2016, Swing signed with Limburg United of the Belgian League. In his debut for Limburg on October 1, 2016, Swing scored a season-high 27 points in a 93–90 loss to Leuven Bears. His only other game 20-point game of the season came on January 21, 2017, as he scored 23 points in a 103–90 win over Antwerp Giants. In 39 league games for Limburg in 2016–17, Swing averaged 9.9 points, 4.3 rebounds and 2.6 assists per game. He also averaged 11.7 points, 5.2 rebounds and 4.2 assists in six FIBA Europe Cup games.

=== Return to Spain (2017–2018) ===
On July 27, 2017, Swing signed with Real Betis Energía Plus of the LEB Oro, returning for Spain for a second stint. However, on August 23, 2017, his contract was terminated by Real Betis in a mutual agreement. That same day, he signed with Gipuzkoa Basket of the Liga ACB. In 34 games for Gipuzkoa in 2017–18, he averaged 10.4 points, 3.6 rebounds and 1.8 assists per game.

=== Israel (2018–2020) ===
On July 12, 2018, Swing signed with Hapoel Be'er Sheva of the Israeli Premier League. On April 12, 2019, he participated in the 2019 Israeli League All-Star Game and the Three-Point Shootout during the same event. Swing took part in 36 Israeli League games, averaging 15.4 points, 5.5 rebounds and 3.2 assists per game. He helped Be'er Sheva reach the 2019 Israeli League playoffs, where they eventually were eliminated by Hapoel Jerusalem in the quarter finals.

On July 6, 2019, Swing signed a one-year deal with Maccabi Rishon LeZion. On December 22, 2019, he recorded a season-high 35 points, while shooting 7-of-12 from three-point range, along with seven rebounds and two assists in a 114–118 triple-overtime loss to Ironi Nahariya.

On February 27, 2020, after parting ways with Rishon, Swing signed with Maccabi Haifa for the rest of the season.

=== Hamburg Towers (2020–2021) ===
On August 29, 2020, Swing signed with the Hamburg Towers of the Basketball Bundesliga.

=== Mexico (2021) ===
In 2021, Swing joined Soles de Mexicali of the Mexican LNBP. He averaged 16.1 points, 5.2 rebounds, 3.7 assists and 1.2 steals per game.

=== Ukraine (2021–2022) ===
On November 26, 2021, Swing signed with BC Kyiv of the Ukrainian Basketball SuperLeague. He left the team in February 2022, just days prior the Russian invasion of Ukraine.

=== Birmingham Squadron (2022) ===
On March 16, 2022, Swing was acquired by the Birmingham Squadron of the NBA G League.

=== Grises de Humacao (2022) ===
On April 12, 2022, Swing signed with Grises de Humacao of the Puerto Rican BSN.

=== Return to Birmingham (2022–2023) ===
On November 4, 2022, Swing was named to the opening night roster for the Birmingham Squadron.

=== Carplus Fuenlabrada (2024) ===
On March 1, 2024, Swing signed with Carplus Fuenlabrada of the LEB Oro. In 13 games, he averaged 13.7 points, 3.8 rebounds and 1.7 assists per game.

=== Return to Soles de Mexicali (2024) ===
In July 2024, Swing joined Soles de Mexicali of the Mexican LNBP for a second stint. In 42 games, he averaged 9.0 points, 2.8 rebounds and 2.0 assists per game.

=== Return to Birmingham (2025) ===
On February 11, 2025, Swing re-joined the Birmingham Squadron of the NBA G League. He was waived by the Squadron on March 3, and was then re-acquired on March 5.

== Personal life ==
Swing is the son of Rick and Linda Swing, and has one brother, Josh, and one sister, Danielle.

Swing's wife, Carlee, is a native of Trussville, Alabama.
