= 2017 State Basketball League season =

- League: State Basketball League
- Sport: Basketball
- Duration: 17 March – 29 July (Regular season); 4 August – 2 September (Finals)
- Number of games: 26 (men); 22 (women)
- Number of teams: 14 (men); 12 (women)

Regular season
- Minor premiers: M: Willetton Tigers; W: Perry Lakes Hawks
- Season MVP: M: Jacob Holmen (Giants); W: Alison Schwagmeyer (Lightning)
- Top scorer: M: Shawn Redhage (Redbacks); W: Chastity Reed (Flames)

Finals
- Champions: M: Perth Redbacks; W: Perry Lakes Hawks
- Runners-up: M: Joondalup Wolves; W: Mandurah Magic
- Grand Final MVP: M: Lee Roberts (Redbacks); W: Antonia Farnworth (Hawks)

SBL seasons
- ← 2016 2018 →

The 2017 State Basketball League season was the 29th season of the State Basketball League (SBL). The regular season began on Friday 17 March and ended on Saturday 29 July. The finals began on Friday 4 August and concluded with the women's grand final on Friday 1 September and the men's grand final on Saturday 2 September.

== Pre-season ==
The 2017 SBL Pre-Season Blitz was held at Warwick Stadium over Saturday 4 March and Sunday 5 March. The tournament featured the Malaysia women's national basketball team.

== Regular season ==
The regular season began on Friday 17 March and ended on Saturday 29 July after 20 rounds of competition. All games over the Easter Round were played on a Thursday night with six venues all hosting games before the league took a break for the Easter long weekend. Anzac Round took place again in round 6 of the competition with the Kalamunda Eastern Suns and Willetton Tigers continuing their Anzac Day game tradition while being joined this year by the Cockburn Cougars hosting the Rockingham Flames on the Tuesday afternoon. There was also Women's Round in round 9, Rivalry Round in round 12, and Heritage Round in round 16.

=== Standings ===
Men's ladder

Pos
Pos	Team	W	L
1	Willetton Tigers	20	6
2	Joondalup Wolves	20	6
3	Geraldton Buccaneers	19	7
4	Perth Redbacks	16	10
5	South West Slammers	15	11
6	Stirling Senators	15	11
7	Cockburn Cougars	15	11
8	Perry Lakes Hawks	12	14
9	Lakeside Lightning	12	14
10	Rockingham Flames	11	15
11	East Perth Eagles	8	18
12	Goldfields Giants	8	18
13	Kalamunda Eastern Suns	7	19
14	Mandurah Magic	4	22

Women's ladder

Pos
Pos	Team	W	L
1	Perry Lakes Hawks	20	2
2	Mandurah Magic	19	3
3	Lakeside Lightning	17	5
4	Stirling Senators	15	7
5	Willetton Tigers	13	9
6	Joondalup Wolves	12	10
7	Perth Redbacks	8	14
8	Cockburn Cougars	8	14
9	Kalamunda Eastern Suns	6	16
10	South West Slammers	6	16
11	Rockingham Flames	6	16
12	East Perth Eagles	2	20

== Finals ==
The finals began on Friday 4 August and consisted of three rounds. The finals concluded with the women's grand final on Friday 1 September and the men's grand final on Saturday 2 September.

=== Men's bracket ===
Quarter-finals
1	Willetton Tigers	80	85	90
8	Perry Lakes Hawks	90	84	87
4	Perth Redbacks	94	107	87
5	South West Slammers	97	99	81
2	Joondalup Wolves	90	90	86
7	Cockburn Cougars	83	120	65
3	Geraldton Buccaneers	89	80	84
6	Stirling Senators	80	93	82

Semi-finals
1	Willetton Tigers	81	92	X
4	Perth Redbacks	85	101	X
2	Joondalup Wolves	77	87	93
3	Geraldton Buccaneers	84	84	81

Grand final
Perth Redbacks	103	X	X
Joondalup Wolves	70	X	X

==== Grand Final summary ====
2 September 2017
7:30 pm

Box score
Report
Highlights

Joondalup Wolves 70, Perth Redbacks 103
Scoring by quarter: 16–24, 21–22, 19–30, 14–27
Pts: Ben Ironmonger 15; Rebs: Ryan Wright 10; Asts: Ben Ironmonger 3	Pts: Lee Roberts 28; Rebs: Lee Roberts 17; Asts: Shawn Redhage 6
Perth wins SBL Championship

Bendat Basketball Centre, Floreat
MVP: Lee Roberts (Redbacks)

=== Women's bracket ===
Quarter-finals
1	Perry Lakes Hawks	83	85	X
8	Cockburn Cougars	68	61	X
4	Stirling Senators	79	65	67
5	Willetton Tigers	74	71	85
2	Mandurah Magic	66	79	X
7	Perth Redbacks	59	54	X
3	Lakeside Lightning	76	73	X
6	Joondalup Wolves	58	56	X

Semi-finals
1	Perry Lakes Hawks	93	90	X
5	Willetton Tigers	81	62	X
2	Mandurah Magic	86	78	67
3	Lakeside Lightning	76	86	61

Grand final
Perry Lakes Hawks	59	X	X
Mandurah Magic	48	X	X

==== Grand Final summary ====
1 September 2017
7:30 pm

Box score
Report
Highlights

Perry Lakes Hawks 59, Mandurah Magic 48
Scoring by quarter: 15–16, 13–14, 14–12, 17–6
Pts: Antonia Farnworth 26; Rebs: Natalie Burton 15; Asts: Lauren Jeffers 5	Pts: Nici Gilday 20; Rebs: Carly Boag 12; Asts: Casey Mihovilovich 3
Perry Lakes wins SBL Championship

Bendat Basketball Centre, Floreat
MVP: Antonia Farnworth (Hawks)

== All-Star games ==
The 2017 SBL All-Star games took place at Bendat Basketball Centre on Monday 5 June, with all proceeds going to Lifeline WA for suicide prevention.

=== Men's game ===
==== Rosters ====
North All-Stars
Pos	Player	Team
Starters
F	Maurice Barrow	Geraldton Buccaneers
G	Courtney Belger	Kalamunda Eastern Suns
C	Kevin Davis	East Perth Eagles
F	Shawn Redhage	Perth Redbacks
G	Benjamin Smith	Perth Redbacks
Reserves
F	Cody Ellis	Stirling Senators
G	Jackson Hussey	Geraldton Buccaneers
F	Ben Purser	Perry Lakes Hawks
C	Rhys Vague	Stirling Senators
G	Drew Williamson	East Perth Eagles
Head coach: Nik Lackovic (Perth Redbacks)

South All-Stars
Pos	Player	Team
Starters
G	Kyle Armour	Willetton Tigers
F	Jalen Billups	Cockburn Cougars
G/F	Julius Bowie	Willetton Tigers
F	Jacob Holmen	Goldfields Giants
G	Tre Nichols	South West Slammers
Reserves
F	Gavin Field	Cockburn Cougars
F	JB Pillard	Goldfields Giants
G	Damien Scott	Willetton Tigers
F	Ray Turner	Willetton Tigers
F	Brian Voelkel	South West Slammers
Head coach: Stephen Black (Willetton Tigers)

==== Game data ====
Highlights

5 June 2017
2:00 pm

Box Score Report Report

North 126, South 129 (OT)
Scoring by quarter: 28–27, 27–38, 29–33, 26–22, Overtime: 16–19
Pts: Smith (26); Rebs: Redhage (11); Asts: Ellis (8)	Pts: Turner (39); Rebs: Turner (10); Asts: Voelkel (9)

Bendat Basketball Centre, Floreat
MVP: Ray Turner

=== Women's game ===
==== Rosters ====
North All-Stars
Pos	Player	Team
Starters
G	Shani Amos	Joondalup Wolves
F/C	Natalie Burton	Perry Lakes Hawks
G	Antonia Farnworth	Perry Lakes Hawks
C	Emilee Harmon	Perth Redbacks
F	Kisha Lee	Stirling Senators
Reserves
G	Chelsea Belcher	Joondalup Wolves
C	Ellyce Ironmonger	Joondalup Wolves
G	Lauren Jeffers	Perry Lakes Hawks
F/C	Jennie Rintala	Kalamunda Eastern Suns
F	Klara Wischer	Joondalup Wolves
F/C	Sarah Donovan	Perry Lakes Hawks
Head coach: Deanna Smith (Perry Lakes Hawks)

South All-Stars
Pos	Player	Team
Starters
G	Stacey Barr	Willetton Tigers
F	Carly Boag	Mandurah Magic
G	Nici Gilday	Mandurah Magic
F	Brittany Hodges	South West Slammers
G/F	Alison Schwagmeyer	Lakeside Lightning
Reserves
F	Courtney Bayliss	South West Slammers
G/F	Sydnee Fipps	Lakeside Lightning
C	Zoe Harper	Willetton Tigers
G	Casey Mihovilovich	Mandurah Magic
F	Kersten Mitchell	Cockburn Cougars
Head coach: Randy Miegel (Mandurah Magic)

==== Game data ====
Highlights

5 June 2017
12:00 pm

Box Score Report Report

North 66, South 106
Scoring by quarter: 13–23, 21–27, 20–20, 12–36
Pts: Burton (18); Rebs: Burton (8); Asts: Wischer (4)	Pts: Boag & Schwagmeyer (18); Rebs: Barr, Boag & Gilday (12); Asts: Gilday (10)

Bendat Basketball Centre, Floreat
MVP: Nici Gilday

== Awards ==
=== Player of the Week ===
Round	Men's Player	Team	Women's Player	Team	Ref
1	Dwayne Benjamin	Geraldton Buccaneers	Chelsea Belcher	Joondalup Wolves	
2	Jalen Billups	Cockburn Cougars	Stacey Barr	Willetton Tigers	
3	Jacob Holmen	Goldfields Giants	Kisha Lee	Stirling Senators	
4	Kevin Davis	East Perth Eagles	Nici Gilday	Mandurah Magic	
5	Jalen Billups	Cockburn Cougars	Emilee Harmon	Perth Redbacks	
6	Jackson Hussey	Geraldton Buccaneers	Alison Schwagmeyer	Lakeside Lightning	
7	Shawn Redhage	Perth Redbacks	Stacey Barr	Willetton Tigers	
8	Ray Turner	Willetton Tigers	Carly Boag	Mandurah Magic	
9	Dwayne Benjamin	Geraldton Buccaneers	Kisha Lee	Stirling Senators	
10	Ray Turner	Willetton Tigers	Klara Wischer	Joondalup Wolves	
11	Jalen Billups	Cockburn Cougars	Alison Schwagmeyer	Lakeside Lightning	
12	Matthew Adekponya	Perry Lakes Hawks	Sydnee Fipps	Lakeside Lightning	
13	Brian Voelkel	South West Slammers	Carly Boag	Mandurah Magic	
14	Jalen Billups	Cockburn Cougars	Nici Gilday	Mandurah Magic	
15	Dwayne Benjamin	Geraldton Buccaneers	Toni Farnworth	Perry Lakes Hawks	
16	Dwayne Benjamin	Geraldton Buccaneers	Sydnee Fipps	Lakeside Lightning	
17	Taylor Mullenax	Mandurah Magic	Alison Schwagmeyer	Lakeside Lightning	
18	James Padgett	Lakeside Lightning	Alison Schwagmeyer	Lakeside Lightning	
19	Brian Voelkel	South West Slammers	Alison Schwagmeyer	Lakeside Lightning	
20	Shawn Redhage	Perth Redbacks	Taylor Roberts	Stirling Senators	

=== Statistics leaders ===
Category	Men's Player	Team	Stat	Women's Player	Team	Stat
Points per game	Shawn Redhage	Perth Redbacks	27.53	Chastity Reed	Rockingham Flames	23.44
Rebounds per game	Brian Voelkel	South West Slammers	16.13	Carly Boag	Mandurah Magic	12.5
Assists per game	Brian Voelkel	South West Slammers	8.65	Shani Amos	Joondalup Wolves	5.00
Steals per game	Rob Brandenberg	Kalamunda Eastern Suns	2.73	Carly Boag	Mandurah Magic	3.30
Blocks per game	Donovon Jack	Rockingham Flames	2.00	Samantha Roscoe	Lakeside Lightning	2.46
Field goal percentage	Mathew Wundenberg	Geraldton Buccaneers	65.22%	Brittany Hodges	South West Slammers	55.00%
3-pt field goal percentage	Lochlan Cummings	Cockburn Cougars	44.36%	Sydnee Fipps	Lakeside Lightning	38.69%
Free throw percentage	Shawn Redhage	Perth Redbacks	87.14%	Nici Gilday	Mandurah Magic	85.37%

=== Regular season ===
The 2017 Basketball WA Annual Awards Night was held on Friday 8 September at Crown Perth.

- Men's Most Valuable Player: Jacob Holmen (Goldfields Giants)
- Women's Most Valuable Player: Alison Schwagmeyer (Lakeside Lightning)
- Men's Coach of the Year: Charles Nix (South West Slammers)
- Women's Coach of the Year: Randy Miegel (Mandurah Magic)
- Men's Most Improved Player: Corey Shervill (Lakeside Lightning)
- Women's Most Improved Player: Chelsea Belcher (Joondalup Wolves)
- Men's All-Star Five:
  - PG: Tre Nichols (South West Slammers)
  - SG: Dwayne Benjamin (Geraldton Buccaneers)
  - SF: Brian Voelkel (South West Slammers)
  - PF: Shawn Redhage (Perth Redbacks)
  - C: Ray Turner (Willetton Tigers)
- Women's All-Star Five:
  - PG: Nici Gilday (Mandurah Magic)
  - SG: Stacey Barr (Willetton Tigers)
  - SF: Alison Schwagmeyer (Lakeside Lightning)
  - PF: Carly Boag (Mandurah Magic)
  - C: Natalie Burton (Perry Lakes Hawks)
- Men's All-Defensive Five:
  - PG: Kyle Armour (Willetton Tigers)
  - SG: Courtney Belger (Kalamunda Eastern Suns)
  - SF: Maurice Barrow (Geraldton Buccaneers)
  - PF: Ben Purser (Perry Lakes Hawks)
  - C: Kevin Davis (Joondalup Wolves)
- Women's All-Defensive Five:
  - PG: Lauren Jeffers (Perry Lakes Hawks)
  - SG: Casey Mihovilovich (Mandurah Magic)
  - SF: Alison Schwagmeyer (Lakeside Lightning)
  - PF: Ellyce Ironmonger (Joondalup Wolves)
  - C: Natalie Burton (Perry Lakes Hawks)

=== Finals ===
- Men's Grand Final MVP: Lee Roberts (Perth Redbacks)
- Women's Grand Final MVP: Antonia Farnworth (Perry Lakes Hawks)
