= Jacob Holmen =

American basketball player (born 1991)

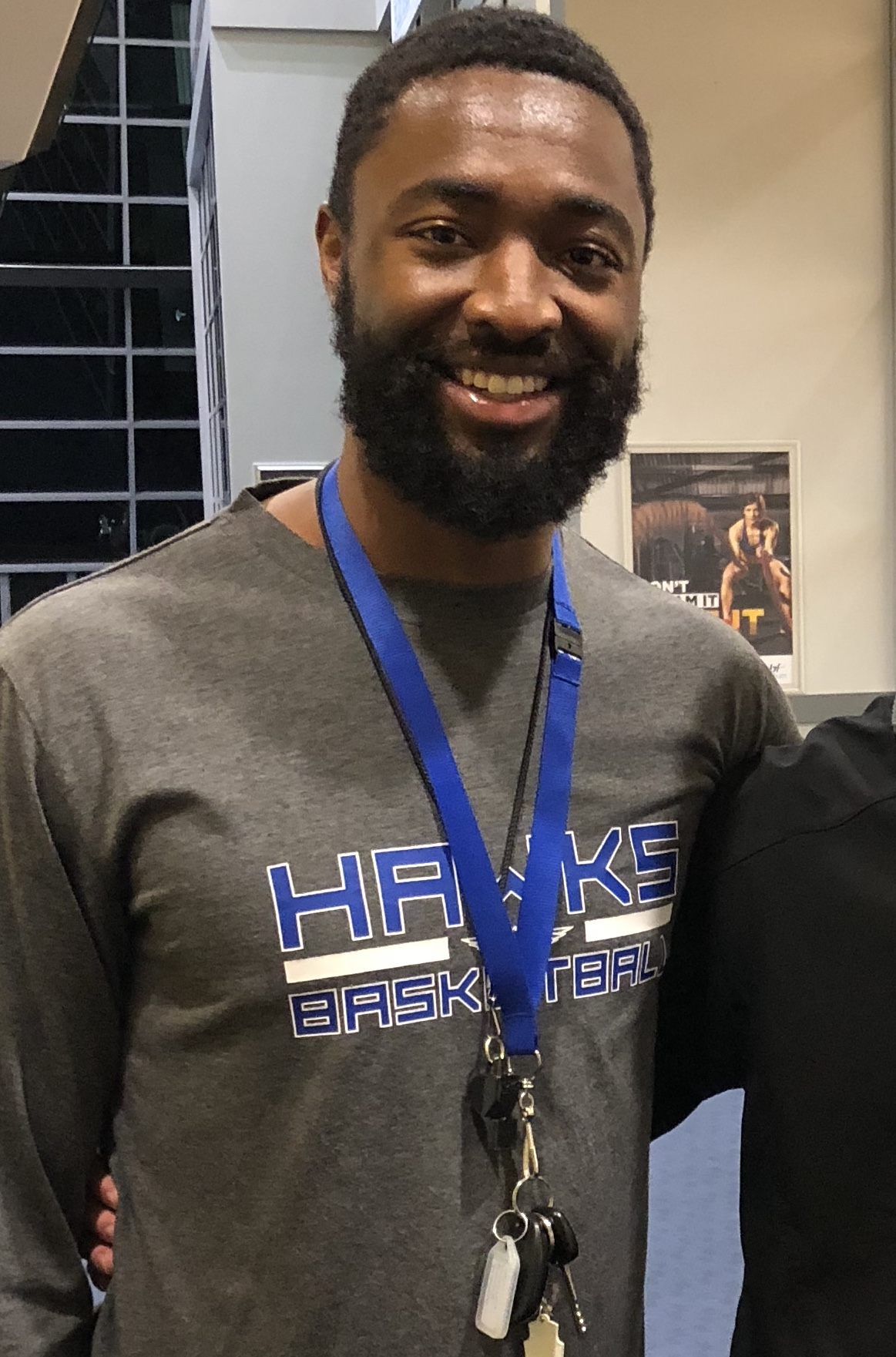
- Holmen in August 2018

Personal information
- Born: August 17, 1991 (age 35) Ohio, U.S.
- Listed height: 6 ft 8 in (2.03 m)
- Listed weight: 225 lb (102 kg)

Career information
- High school: Whitehouse (Whitehouse, Texas)
- College: North Texas (2009–2013)
- NBA draft: 2013: undrafted
- Playing career: 2015–2018
- Position: Power forward

Career history
- 2015–2017: Goldfields Giants
- 2016: Balkan Botevgrad
- 2018: Perry Lakes Hawks

Career highlights
- SBL champion (2018); SBL Most Valuable Player (2017)

Jacob Ervin Holmen (born August 17, 1991) is an American former professional basketball player. He played four years of college basketball for North Texas, but his time on the court was restricted due to injuries, including his senior year where he sat out the entire second half of the season after sustaining a third concussion in just over a year. Upon turning pro, he played in Australia and Bulgaria, making a name for himself in the State Basketball League (SBL). He was named SBL Most Valuable Player in 2017 and won an SBL championship in 2018, but two knee injuries in less than a year saw his playing career come to an end.

== High school career ==
Holmen was born in the U.S. state of Ohio. He attended Whitehouse High School in Whitehouse, Texas, where he played for the school's basketball team. As a sophomore, he was named the 11-4A Newcomer of the Year. As a junior, he was the District 11-4A Defensive Player of the Year and a First-Team All-East Texas selection by the Tyler Morning Telegraph. He averaged 17 points, 10 rebounds and four blocks per game in leading Whitehouse to the 2008 Regional semifinals.

On November 19, 2008, Holmen signed a National Letter of Intent to play college basketball for the University of North Texas.

As a senior in 2008–09, Holmen averaged 20 points and 11.5 rebounds per game in earning All-East Texas MVP honors.

A versatile athlete, Holmen also lettered in football and track at Whitehouse. Specializing as a sprinter, Holmen took first place in District 14-4A in both the 400-meter dash and the 4x400-meter relay, and won his heat in the 400 at the Region II 4A Track Championships.

== College career ==
As a freshman at North Texas in 2009–10, Holmen played a career-high 31 games with eight starts, and averaged 4.8 points and 2.4 rebounds in 13.5 minutes per game. On December 28, he hit a 15-foot jumper with three seconds remaining to lift North Texas to a 71–69 victory over Texas Southern. He was a member of NT's Sun Belt tournament championship, which saw them move onto the 2010 NCAA tournament where they lost in the first round of the West Regional finals. Holmen saw six minutes in the NCAA tournament game against Kansas State.

As a sophomore in 2010–11, Holmen missed the final seven games of the season after suffering a broken hand in a loss to Louisiana-Monroe on February 19. In 26 games, he averaged 5.8 points and 3.0 rebounds in 14.7 minutes per game off the bench. He had gradually ascended late in the season, having scored in double figures in three of his final six games and posted a double-double with 15 points and 10 rebounds in a loss to Louisiana-Lafayette on January 27.

As a junior in 2011–12, Holmen played 22 games and made a career-high 14 starts. He subsequently averaged a career-high 7.0 points with 3.3 rebounds in 20.8 minutes per game. He suffered two concussions during the season and missed 10 games. On February 11, he scored a then career-high 20 points in an 86–81 double-overtime win over Florida Atlantic. He was held scoreless in the first half, but scored 12 of NT's 16 points to open the second half. In the semifinal of the 2012 Sun Belt tournament, he scored a career-high 21 points in a 76–72 win over Arkansas State. In the final, he scored 11 points in a 74–70 loss to Western Kentucky. He was subsequently named in the Sun Belt All-Tournament Team.

As a senior in 2012–13, Holmen appeared in just 15 games, with his final college appearance coming on January 12, 2013, against South Alabama. He was ruled out for the rest of the season after sustaining a third concussion in just over a year. He had seven starts in his final season and averaged 5.6 points and a career-high 3.5 rebounds in 15.7 minutes per game.

Deprived of turning pro upon graduating from North Texas, Holmen began a youth coaching career.

=== College statistics ===
Year	Team	GP	GS	MPG	FG%	3P%	FT%	RPG	APG	SPG	BPG	PPG
2009–10	North Texas	31	8	13.5	.415	.130	.806	2.4	.4	.3	.2	4.8
2010–11	North Texas	26	0	14.7	.433	.353	.750	3.0	.5	.2	.1	5.8
2011–12	North Texas	22	14	20.8	.391	.333	.786	3.3	1.0	.3	.1	7.0
2012–13	North Texas	15	7	15.7	.381	.323	.769	3.5	.3	.3	.3	5.6
Career		94	29	15.9	.407	.299	.780	2.9	.5	.2	.2	5.7

== Professional career ==
=== First two seasons with the Giants (2015–2016) ===
On December 22, 2014, Holmen signed a professional contract in Australia with the Goldfields Giants of the State Basketball League (SBL) for the 2015 season. He joined the Giants vowing to bring a winning attitude to the struggling club. In his professional debut, he had 22 points and six rebounds in a 114–76 loss to the Willetton Tigers. After the Giants started the season 0–8, Holmen helped them get their first win with 43 points and 15 rebounds against the East Perth Eagles. The Giants won 14 of their final 18 games to finish the regular season in seventh place with a 14–12 record. They went on to defeat the second-seeded Geraldton Buccaneers 2–0 in the quarter-finals, with Holmen scoring 29 points in game one and 14 points in game two. In game one of the semifinals, Holmen had 35 points, 15 rebounds and six assists in a 116–111 overtime loss to the South West Slammers. The Giants went on to lose game two 100–95 despite Holmen's 26 points. He appeared in all 30 games for the Giants, averaging 24.3 points, 10.6 rebounds and 2.6 assists per game.

During the off-season, Holmen returned to Texas and drew the attention of the NBA D-League after a successful tryout in Houston which saw him eligible to be drafted in the 2015 draft. He ultimately went undrafted and thus turned his attention back to Australia.

On December 15, 2015, Holmen re-signed with the Giants for the 2016 State Basketball League season. He was named team captain for 2016 and was considered a league MVP candidate mid-season. In round two, he had 37 points and 19 rebounds in the first outing and 38 points and 21 rebounds in the second. In round four, he had 32 points and 18 rebounds in the first outing and 39 points and 16 rebounds in the second. In round 12, he had a 36-point effort. In the Giants' season finale, Holmen recorded a season-high 46 points with 19 rebounds in a 129–123 loss to the Slammers. The Giants missed the finals in 2016 with a 7–19 record and a 12th-place finish. Holmen appeared in all 26 games and averaged 25.3 points, 12.5 rebounds and 2.7 assists. He subsequently finished top 10 in the SBL MVP voting.

=== Bulgaria (2016) ===
Following the conclusion of the SBL season, Holmen moved to Bulgaria to play for Balkan Botevgrad of the National Basketball League. In September 2016, he helped the team win the Botevgrad Cup, scoring 22 points in the final against Serbian team Dynamic. He appeared in the first three games of the 2016–17 season, with Balkan losing all three contests. In his third and final game, he recorded 21 points with five 3-pointers and eight rebounds. He left the team in early November, reportedly unexpectedly without telling anyone at the club.

=== MVP season (2017) ===
On December 24, 2016, Holmen re-signed with the Giants for the 2017 State Basketball League season. He continued on as captain of the Giants in 2017, but a hamstring injury suffered on the eve of the season saw him miss the first three games. In his season debut, he scored a season-high 37 points. He had a 36-point game in early May, and two 35-point games in early June. In the Giants' season finale, Holmen scored 34 points in an 88–79 win over the Rockingham Flames. The Giants missed the finals in 2017 with an 8–18 record and a 12th-place finish. Holmen capped off his third season by being named SBL Most Valuable Player, becoming the first Giants player to win the award in the club's 28 seasons in the league. Despite the three games he missed at the start of the year, he polled 130 votes to finish three votes ahead of second. In 23 games, he averaged 25.4 points, 9.9 rebounds and 3.7 assists per game.

=== Injury-riddled end to career (2018) ===
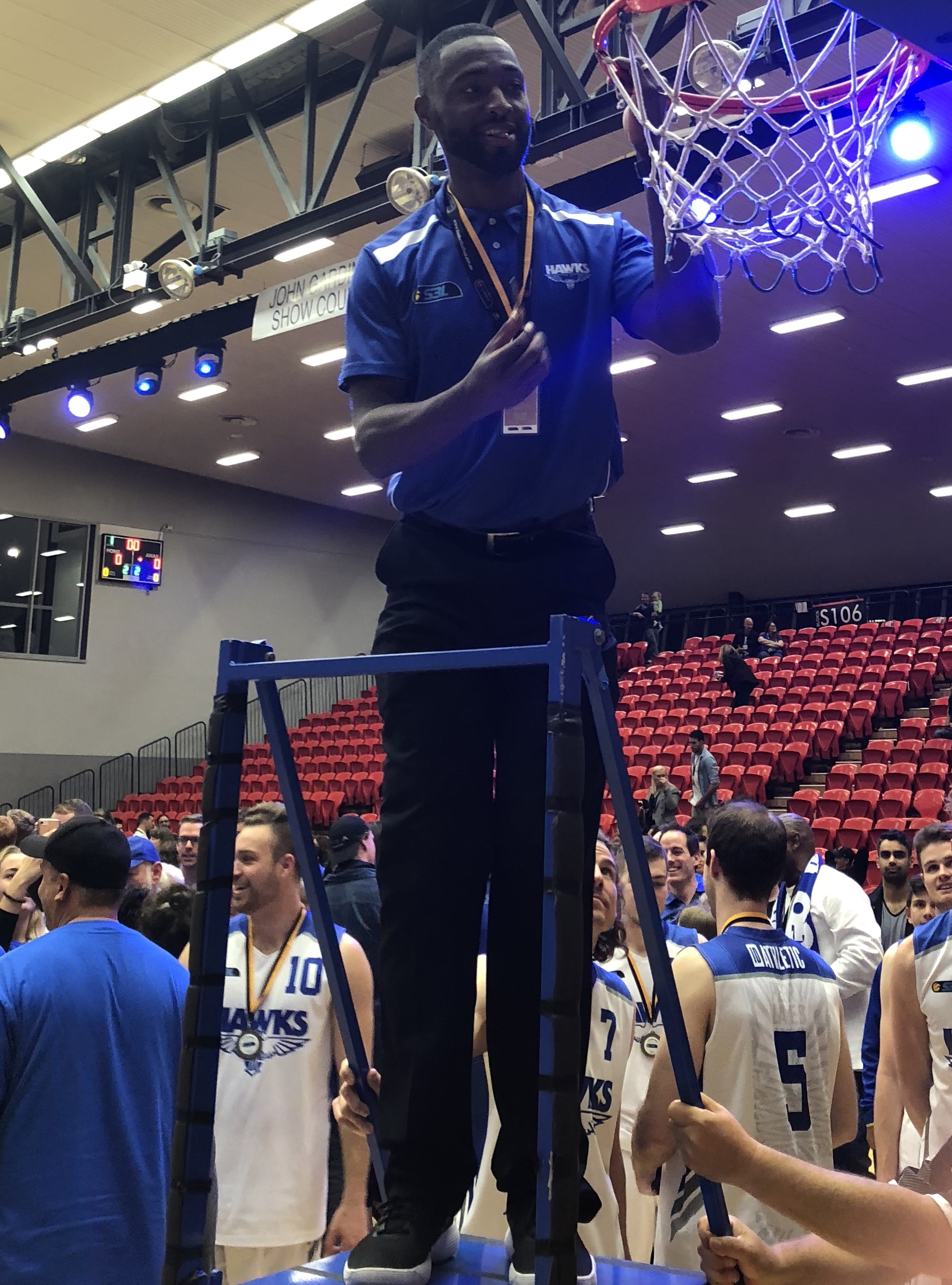
Holmen following the Hawks' championship win

In November 2017, Holmen was on the verge of signing with the Hobart Chargers of the South East Australian Basketball League until he ruptured his ACL.

In April 2018, Holmen returned to the SBL and joined the Perry Lakes Hawks. In his debut for the Hawks, he scored 14 points. In his fifth game for the Hawks, he had 28 points and 23 rebounds. He scored 30 points or more three times during the 2018 season, including a season-high 38 points. The Hawks started the season with a 6–8 record, before going on a 12-game winning streak to finish in fourth place at 18–8. In the quarter-finals, Holmen helped the Hawks defeat the Lakeside Lightning 2–1 with a 33-point effort in game three. In game one of the semi-finals against the Rockingham Flames on August 18, Holmen suffered a season-ending knee injury in the first quarter as the Hawks lost 92–73. It was later announced that Holmen would require a knee reconstruction after again rupturing his ACL and suffering a torn meniscus. Despite losing Holmen, the Hawks went on to defeat the Flames in three games to reach the SBL Grand Final. In the grand final, the Hawks defeated the Joondalup Wolves 94–87 to win Holmen his first SBL championship. In 24 games for the Hawks in 2018, he averaged 17.8 points, 9.4 rebounds and 2.4 assists per game.

== Personal life ==
Holmen got married in October 2017.

In September 2018, Holmen returned to Texas and became a coach at Coram Deo Academy. He was still in the role as of February 2023.
