= Dwayne Benjamin (basketball) =

American basketball player (born 1993)

Personal information
- Born: June 7, 1993 (age 33) Lafayette, Louisiana, U.S.
- Listed height: 6 ft 7 in (2.01 m)
- Listed weight: 210 lb (95 kg)

Career information
- High school: Northside (Lafayette, Louisiana)
- College: Mt. San Jacinto (2012–2014); Oregon (2014–2016)
- NBA draft: 2016: undrafted
- Playing career: 2016–2020
- Position: Forward

Career history
- 2016: Bakken Bears
- 2017: Geraldton Buccaneers
- 2017–2018: Blokotehna
- 2018: Pardubice
- 2019: Levickí Patrioti
- 2019: Rabotnički
- 2020: Ostioneros de Guaymas

Career highlights
- Slovak Cup winner (2019); SBL All-Star Five (2017); SBL All-Star (2017)

Dwayne Benjamin (born June 7, 1993) is an American former professional basketball player. He played two seasons of college basketball for Oregon before playing professionally in Denmark, Australia, North Macedonia, Czech Republic, Slovakia and Mexico.

== High school career ==
Benjamin attended Northside High School in Lafayette, Louisiana, where he played basketball, football and track and field. He helped Northside's basketball team earn a 26–4 record as a senior in 2011–12. He was a talented wide receiver on the football team as well, with many schools offering him scholarships to play football. He caught 14 touchdowns and totaled 927 receiving yards on 45 receptions in 2010.

== College career ==
Coming out of high school, Benjamin joined Mt. San Jacinto College in California. During his freshman campaign in 2012–13, he averaged 15.8 points, 7.2 rebounds and 1.6 assists per game, while compiling seven double-doubles. Playing 28 of 31 games, he was a major factor in the team's success as they finished with a 21–11 record.

As a sophomore in 2013–14, Benjamin averaged 21.1 points per game while starting all 28 of the games he played. He also averaged 7.8 rebounds and 2.1 assists, and shot 44.4 percent from the field. He scored 25 or more points nine different times, including a high of 38, and grabbed more than 10 rebounds in five different games to help the team finish with a 25–5 record.

After committing to Oregon in October 2013, Benjamin joined the Ducks squad as a junior in 2014–15. He played in 34 of 36 games while starting in 13 as a junior, averaging 8.4 points, 5.8 rebounds and 1.0 assists in 23.2 minutes per game. On February 8, 2015, Benjamin scored a career-high 25 points in a 95–72 victory over Washington State. He finished 10 of 11 from the field and was perfect on three 3-point attempts.

As a senior at Oregon in 2015–16, Benjamin averaged 7.8 points, 3.0 rebounds and 1.0 steals in 21.7 minutes over 38 appearances as the Ducks' sixth man. On November 25, 2015, he tied his career high of 25 points in a 91–68 win over Arkansas State. Known for his athleticism and leaping ability while at Oregon, Benjamin was a valuable piece for the Ducks during their Elite Eight run in March and April 2016. He also practiced with the football team a number times during the spring before ultimately deciding that he wanted to continue his basketball career.

== Professional career ==
=== Bakken Bears (2016) ===
On June 30, 2016, Benjamin signed with the Bakken Bears of the Danish Basketball League for the 2016–17 season. However, on November 10, 2016, he was released by Bakken. In five league games, he averaged 12.6 points, 4.0 rebounds, 1.4 assists and 1.2 steals per game. He also appeared in six BCL games, averaging 7.5 points, 5.2 rebounds, 1.2 assists and 1.0 steals per game.

=== Geraldton Buccaneers (2017) ===
In January 2017, Benjamin signed with the Geraldton Buccaneers of the State Basketball League for the 2017 season. He made his debut for the Buccaneers in their season opener on March 18, 2017, recording 33 points, five rebounds, seven assists, four steals and one block in a 119–84 win over the Kalamunda Eastern Suns. A day later, he had 29 points, nine rebounds, four assists, four steals and one block in a 99–85 win over the Lakeside Lightning. He was subsequently named Player of the Week for Round 1. On May 13, 2017, he recorded season highs of 42 points and 16 rebounds in a 117–113 win over the Perth Redbacks. On July 1, 2017, he had another 42-point effort in a 111–77 win over the East Perth Eagles. He helped the Buccaneers finish the regular season in third place with a 19–7 record, while garnering a total of four Player of the Week awards. In Game 3 of the Buccaneers' Quarter Finals series against the Stirling Senators, Benjamin scored a game-high 33 points to help the team win 84–82 and move on to the Semi Finals with a 2–1 series win. In Game 1 of the Buccaneers' Semi Finals series against the Joondalup Wolves, Benjamin scored a game-high 34 points to help the team win 84–77. The Buccaneers went on to lose the series 2–1 despite a 21-point effort from Benjamin in the 93–81 Game 3 loss. In 30 games for the Buccaneers, he averaged 26.4 points, 7.3 rebounds and 2.6 assists per game. At the end-of-season awards night, Benjamin was selected to the SBL All-Star Five.

On September 26, 2017, Benjamin signed with the Joondalup Wolves for the 2018 SBL season. However, on January 22, 2018, Benjamin was replaced on the roster in order for him to pursue other, higher-level opportunities.

=== Blokotehna (2017–2018) ===
On July 3, 2017, Benjamin signed with Macedonian club Blokotehna for the 2017–18 season. He made his debut for Blokotehna in their season opener on October 8, 2017, recording 28 points and 13 rebounds in a 99–56 win over Kožuv. In 31 games in the Macedonian First League, he averaged 15.0 points, 5.5 rebounds, 2.4 assists and 1.3 steals per game. He also averaged 19.2 points, 6.1 rebounds, 2.1 assists and 1.8 steals in 13 Balkan League games.

=== Pardubice and Levice (2018–2019) ===
On June 27, 2018, Benjamin signed with Czech club Pardubice for the 2018–19 season. He averaged 15 points per game in the Czech NBL, but was released in December 2018 due to violating the club's internal rules on dieting. He was also carrying an injury at the time. In January 2019, he signed with Levickí Patrioti of the Slovak Basketball League. In 14 league games, he averaged 10.8 points and 5.7 rebounds per game. He also averaged 14.0 points, 7.3 rebounds and 3.3 assists in three Alpe Adria Cup games.

=== Rabotnički (2019) ===
On September 13, 2019, Benjamin signed with Rabotnički of the Macedonian First League. He left the team in December 2019 after averaging 17.7 points, 6.4 rebounds, 3.9 assists and 1.8 steals in 10 games.

=== Ostioneros de Guaymas (2020) ===
In March 2020, Benjamin joined Mexican team Ostioneros de Guaymas of the CIBACOPA.
