= Lee Roberts (basketball) =

American basketball player (born 1987)

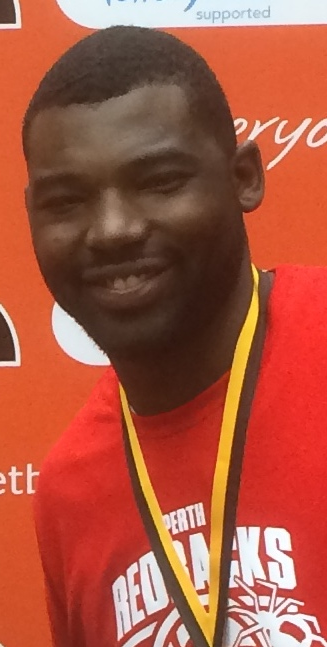
- Roberts with the Perth Redbacks in 2017

No. 24 – East Perth Eagles
- Position: Power forward / center
- League: NBL1 West

Personal information
- Born: February 10, 1987 (age 39) Seattle, Washington, U.S.
- Listed height: 201 cm (6 ft 7 in)
- Listed weight: 103 kg (227 lb)

Career information
- High school: Midpark (Middleburg Heights, Ohio)
- College: Findlay (2005–2009)
- NBA draft: 2009: undrafted
- Playing career: 2009–present

Career history
- 2009–2010: SG Braunschweig
- 2010–2011: Team FOG Næstved
- 2011: Stirling Senators
- 2011–2012: Shinshu Brave Warriors
- 2012: Kalamunda Eastern Suns
- 2012–2014: Estudiantes Concordia
- 2014: Bucaneros de La Guaira
- 2014: Perth Redbacks
- 2014–2015: Ciclista Olímpico
- 2015–2016: Libertad Sunchales
- 2016–2017: Ironi Nes Ziona
- 2017–2019: Perth Redbacks
- 2017–2018: Virtus Roma
- 2018–2019: San Martín Corrientes
- 2019–2021: Atlético Aguada
- 2020: Joondalup Wolves
- 2021–present: East Perth Eagles
- 2021–2023: Club Atlético Peñarol
- 2024: Club Trouville

Career highlights
- LUB champion (2020); SBL champion (2017); SBL Grand Final MVP (2017); Israeli National League champion (2017); Israeli Leumit Cup winner (2016); Argentinian TNA champion (2013); Japanese BJ League All-Star (2012); Danish League All-Star (2011); NCAA Division II champion (2009); GLIAC South Division All-Defensive Team (2009)

Lee Roberts (born February 10, 1987) is an American professional basketball player for the East Perth Eagles of the NBL1 West. He played college basketball for the Findlay Oilers between 2005 and 2009, where he won an NCAA Division II national championship as a senior. Since 2011, Roberts has had consistent yearly stints in the State Basketball League (SBL) / NBL1 West in Australia. He also consistently played seasons in South America between 2012 and 2024.

In 2017, Roberts helped the Perth Redbacks win the SBL championship while earning grand final MVP honors. He has also won championships in the Argentinian TNA (2013), Israeli National League (2017), and Uruguayan League (2020).

== Early life ==
Roberts was born in Seattle, Washington to army parents. He lived in Seattle for seven years before moving to Alaska, where he spent 2½ years before to moving to Cleveland, Ohio. He attended middle school and high school in the Cleveland area, as he played basketball for Midpark High School in Middleburg Heights. He received recognition playing for Midpark; in 2014, Roberts said "I was actually recruited for high jump, I was waiting for a couple of schools to ask about basketball and then Findlay offered me a full scholarship. I went to visit them and I was sold."

== College career ==
Roberts played four years of college basketball for the University of Findlay between 2005 and 2009. The Oilers lost only 12 games in his four years at Findley, as they were GLIAC Tournament winners in 2007 and 2009, and NCAA Division II national champions in 2009. The Oilers entered the 2008–09 season as the top ranked team in NCAA Division II basketball. 36 games later, the Oilers remained on top as they were crowned the 2009 NCAA Division II men's basketball champions in Springfield, Massachusetts on March 28. The Oilers began their road to the championship by winning all 27 of their regular season games en route to a GLIAC South Division title. After winning the GLIAC Tournament, the Oilers had a flawless run during the 2009 NCAA Division II Tournament, including reaching the Final 4 for the first time in school history with an 89–79 win over C.W. Post behind a career-high 23 points from Roberts. In the national championship game against Cal Poly Pomona, Roberts had nine points, eight rebounds and three steals. Individually, Roberts earned GLIAC All-Tournament Team honors in 2008 and GLIAC South Division All-Defensive Team honors in 2009. As a senior in 2008–09, he appeared in all 36 games and averaged 10.4 points and 6.6 rebounds per game.

=== College statistics ===
Year	Team	GP	GS	MPG	FG%	3P%	FT%	RPG	APG	SPG	BPG	PPG
2005–06	Findlay	29	0	10.3	.694	.000	.458	2.0	.1	.4	.4	2.7
2006–07	Findlay	31	1	14.9	.654	.000	.708	4.6	.2	.5	1.0	6.8
2007–08	Findlay	31	27	25.4	.633	.500	.753	6.1	.8	.9	.8	12.5
2008–09	Findlay	36	36	26.6	.609	.000	.645	6.6	.5	.5	1.0	10.4

== Professional career ==
Coming out of college, Roberts signed with an agent from Germany, who set him up with a team in France. However, he was considered too short by his coach, and after two weeks he was cut. He subsequently moved to Germany to live with his agent. There he tried out for numerous teams, but money was always the issue. He landed at Bayern Munich, but after a month, he was cut after sustaining an injury. He ultimately joined SG Braunschweig of the German ProB. In 30 games for Braunschweig in 2009–10, he averaged 18.0 points, 7.9 rebounds, 1.5 assists and 1.2 steals per game.

In July 2010, Roberts signed with Team FOG Næstved of the Danish Basketligaen. In 30 games during the 2010–11 season, he averaged 18.4 points, 13.2 rebounds, 1.6 assists, 1.6 steals and 1.2 blocks per game.

Roberts joined the Stirling Senators of the State Basketball League (SBL) in Australia for the 2011 season. He averaged 26.1 points and 14.9 rebounds per game.

In September 2011, Roberts signed with the Shinshu Brave Warriors of the Japanese BJ League. In 52 games during the 2011–12 season, he averaged 16.9 points, 10.2 rebounds, 1.8 assists and 1.2 steals per game.

Roberts joined the Kalamunda Eastern Suns for the 2012 SBL season, helping them make the playoffs. In 15 games, he averaged 23.2 points, 17.8 rebounds, 3.5 assists and 2.1 steals per game.

In September 2012, Roberts signed with Estudiantes Concordia of the Argentinian second-tier league, TNA. He helped Estudiantes win the 2012–13 championship, which saw them be promoted to the top league for the 2013–14 season. Roberts had 16 points in the deciding Game 5. In 36 games during the 2012–13 season, he averaged 17.7 points, 11.8 rebounds, 1.1 assists, 1.1 steals and 1.0 blocks per game.

In July 2013, Roberts re-signed with Estudiantes Concordia for the 2013–14 LigaA season. In 44 games, he averaged 16.7 points, 10.8 rebounds, 1.6 assists and 1.4 steals per game.

In April 2014, Roberts signed with Bucaneros de La Guaira of the Venezuelan SPB. In 10 games, he averaged 10.4 points and 6.1 rebounds per game.

In June 2014, Roberts joined the Perth Redbacks for the rest of the 2014 SBL season. In 15 games, he averaged 24.8 points, 14.0 rebounds, 2.6 assists, 1.7 steals and 1.3 blocks per game.

Roberts returned to Argentina for the 2024–15 season and joined Ciclista Olímpico of the LigaA. In 55 games, he averaged 17.6 points, 10.1 rebounds, 1.4 assists and 1.2 steals per game.

For the 2015–16 LigaA season, Roberts joined Libertad Sunchales. He suffered rib injuries in early October 2015 when he and two teammates were attacked by roughly 30 people in a bar in the city of Rafaela. He ended up leaving the team in April 2016, citing personal problems. In 52 games, he averaged 18.4 points, 9.5 rebounds, 1.5 assists and 1.1 steals per game.

In August 2016, Roberts signed with Israeli team Ironi Nes Ziona. A month later, he helped Nes Ziona claim the Leumit Cup title after overcoming Maccabi Rehovot in the final. Nes Ziona finished the regular season in fourth position with a 16–10 record and advanced through to the National League Finals, where they swept Hapoel Be'er Sheva 3–0 in the best-of-five series. In 35 games during the 2016–17 season, he averaged 16.4 points, 8.7 rebounds, 1.0 assists, 1.6 steals and 1.2 blocks per game.

In May 2017, Roberts joined the Perth Redbacks for the rest of the 2017 SBL season. He helped the Redbacks reach the SBL Grand Final, where he recorded 28 points and 17 rebounds in a 103–70 victory over the Joondalup Wolves to win the championship. He was subsequently named grand final MVP. In 19 games for the Redbacks in 2017, he averaged 22.1 points, 10.6 rebounds, 2.7 assists and 1.5 steals per game.

On August 12, 2017, Roberts signed with Acea Virtus Roma of the Italian Serie A2 for the 2017–18 season. In 31 games, he averaged 18.7 points, 8.3 rebounds, 1.6 assists and 1.1 steals per game.

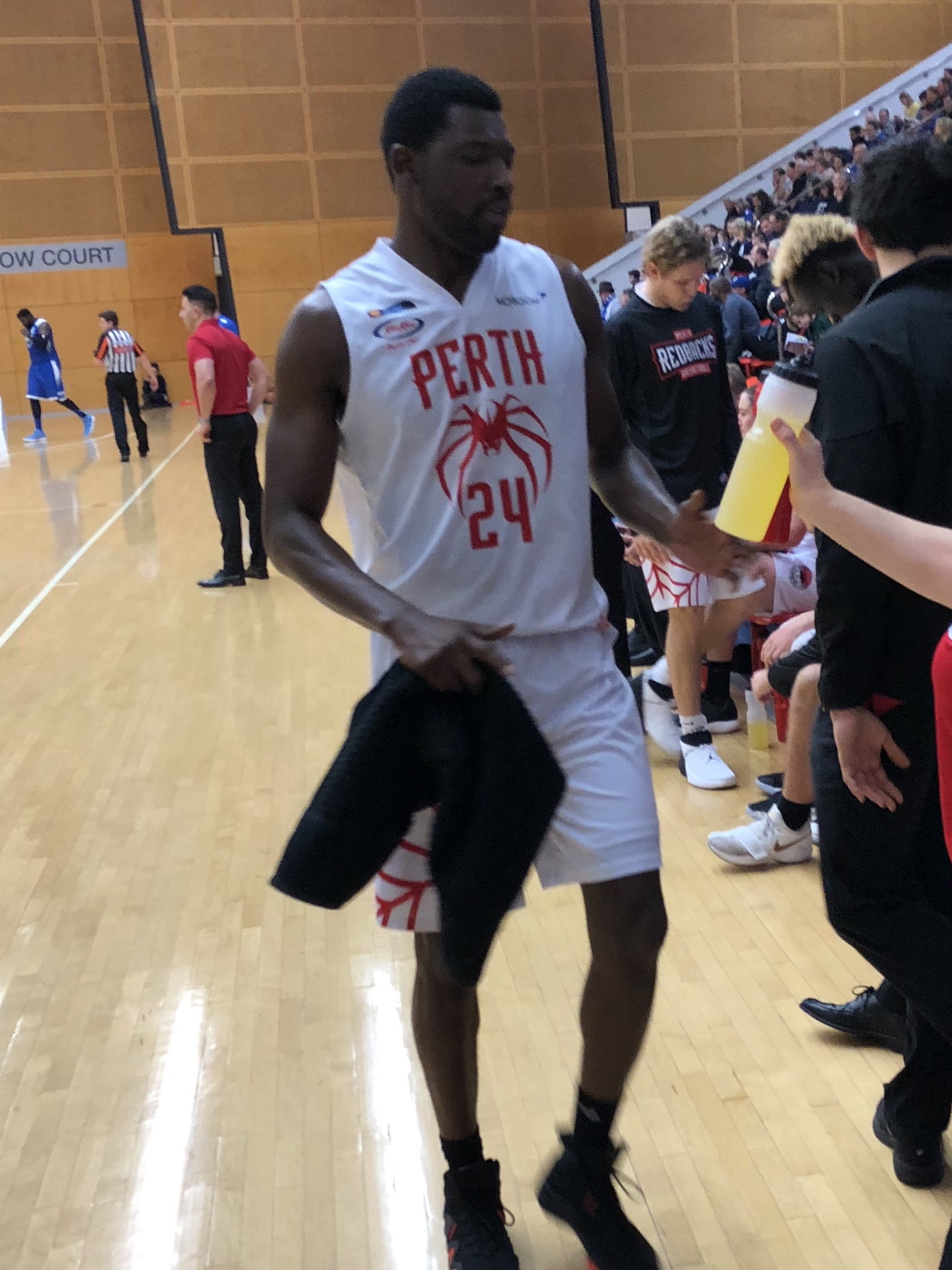
Roberts with the Redbacks in June 2018

Roberts re-joined the Perth Redbacks for the 2018 SBL season. In the first game of the quarter-finals, Roberts recorded 30 points and 14 rebounds in a 114–109 win over the Stirling Senators. In 16 games, he averaged 15.4 points, 7.6 rebounds and 2.6 assists per game.

In July 2018, Roberts signed with San Martín Corrientes of the LigaA, returning to Argentina for a fifth season. In 39 games, he averaged 13.6 points, 9.2 rebounds, 1.9 assists and 1.1 steals per game.

In June 2019, Roberts re-joined the Perth Redbacks for the rest of the 2019 SBL season, despite being unable to qualify for the finals. In the Redbacks' season finale on July 26, Roberts scored a season-high 30 points in a 106–80 win over the Cockburn Cougars. In seven games, he averaged 25 points, 9.29 rebounds and 1.43 assists per game.

In August 2019, Roberts signed with Atlético Aguada of the Liga Uruguaya de Basketball (LUB). The 2019–20 LUB season was halted in March 2020. Roberts had played 24 games up until this point. He went on to play six games for the Joondalup Wolves during the 2020 West Coast Classic in Perth. In November 2020, the 2019–20 LUB season playoffs began, but were paused later that month before resuming in February 2021. On February 26, 2021, Aguada was crowned 2019–20 champions after a 3–1 finals victory over Trouville. In 36 total games for Aguada between October 2019 and February 2021, Roberts averaged 16.2 points, 10.1 rebounds, 1.7 assists and 1.3 steals per game.

Roberts re-joined Aguada for the 2021 LUB season, which started in March 2021. In 13 games, he averaged 16.9 points and 8.9 rebounds per game.

In June 2021, Roberts joined the East Perth Eagles of the NBL1 West for the rest of the 2021 season. In nine games, he averaged 19.44 points, 12.11 rebounds, 1.66 assists and 1.55 steals per game.

For the 2021–22 LUB season, Roberts joined Club Atlético Peñarol. He helped the team reach the LUB Finals, where they lost 4–1 to Biguá. In 38 games, he averaged 16.2 points, 8.3 rebounds and 1.2 steals per game.

Roberts re-joined the Eagles for the 2022 NBL1 West season. In 10 games, he averaged 17.6 points, 8.3 rebounds, 2.0 assists and 1.7 steals per game.

Roberts returned to Club Atlético Peñarol for the 2022–23 LUB season. In 30 games, he averaged 15.1 points and 8.2 rebounds per game.

Roberts re-joined the Eagles for the 2023 NBL1 West season. In 17 games, he averaged 15.9 points, 9.5 rebounds and 2.2 assists per game.

In January 2024, Roberts joined Club Trouville of the LUB. In 26 games to finish the 2023–24 season, he averaged 16.3 points, 8.0 rebounds, 1.8 assists and 1.1 steals per game.

Roberts re-joined the Eagles for the 2024 NBL1 West season. In 15 games, he averaged 13.8 points, 7.4 rebounds, 2.5 assists and 1.1 steals per game.

After spending his first full off-season solely in Perth, Roberts re-joined the Eagles for the 2025 NBL1 West season as an unrestricted local player. He took on the captaincy role in 2025. In 24 games, he averaged 17.71 points, 8.88 rebounds and 3.08 assists per game.

In December 2025, Roberts re-signed with the Eagles for the 2026 NBL1 West season. He continued as team captain. At 39 years old, he took a step back and ultimately averaged less than 12 points or 20 minutes a game for the first time in his professional career.

== Personal life ==
As of May 2024, Roberts was married to Taylor Roberts (née Bestry), a fellow basketball player with the East Perth Eagles women's team. He has two daughters, with one being born in Uruguay. He speaks Spanish.
