= Carly Boag =

Australian basketball player

Personal information
- Born: 4 September 1991 (age 35)
- Listed height: 6 ft 2 in (1.88 m)

Career information
- High school: Abbotsleigh (Sydney, New South Wales)
- College: Minot State (2010–2014)
- WNBA draft: 2014: undrafted
- Playing career: 2014–present
- Position: Forward

Career history
- 2014–2015: Leon Tregor Basket 29
- 2015–2016: Bundaberg Bears
- 2015–2018: Sydney Uni Flames
- 2017–2019: Mandurah Magic
- 2019–2020: Espoo Basket
- 2020: Hornsby Spiders
- 2020: Sydney Uni Flames
- 2021–2023: Mandurah Magic
- 2021–2022: Bendigo Spirit

Career highlights
- WNBL champion (2017); SBL All-Star Five (2017)

Carly Denise Elizabeth Boag (born 4 September 1991) is an Australian-Canadian basketball player who last played for the Mandurah Magic of the NBL1 West. She played college basketball for the Minot State Beavers and has played in the Women's National Basketball League (WNBL) for the Sydney Uni Flames and Bendigo Spirit.

== Early life ==
Boag grew up in Tamworth, New South Wales, and attended Abbotsleigh in Sydney.

== College career ==
Boag played college basketball in the United States for the Minot State Beavers in the NCAA Division II between 2010 and 2014.

== Professional career ==
Boag's first stint out of college was in France with Leon Tregor Basket 29 of the Ligue Féminine de Basketball 2 during the 2014–15 season.

Boag returned to Australia in 2015 and played for the Bundaberg Bears in the Queensland Basketball League (QBL). She then joined the Sydney Uni Flames for the 2015–16 WNBL season. She returned to the Bears for the 2016 QBL season.

Boag returned to the Flames for the 2016–17 WNBL season and helped them win the WNBL championship.

After playing for the Mandurah Magic in the 2017 State Basketball League season and earning All-Star Five honours, Boag played her third season with the Flames in 2017–18. She continued with the Magic in 2018 and 2019.

For the 2019–20 season, Boag played in Finland's Naisten Korisliiga for Espoo Basket.

In 2020, Boag had a six-game stint with the Hornsby Spiders in the Waratah League and then played for the Sydney Uni Flames in the WNBL Hub season in Queensland.

Boag returned to the Mandurah Magic for the 2021 NBL1 West season. After playing for the Bendigo Spirit in the 2021–22 WNBL season, she returned to the Magic for the 2022 NBL1 West season. She suffered a knee injury with the Magic in June 2023.

== Personal life ==
Boag is the daughter of Dianna and John Boag. She played alongside her twin sister, Christina, at college and professionally. She has dual citizenship in both Australia and Canada.
