= Maurice Barrow =

American basketball player (born 1992)

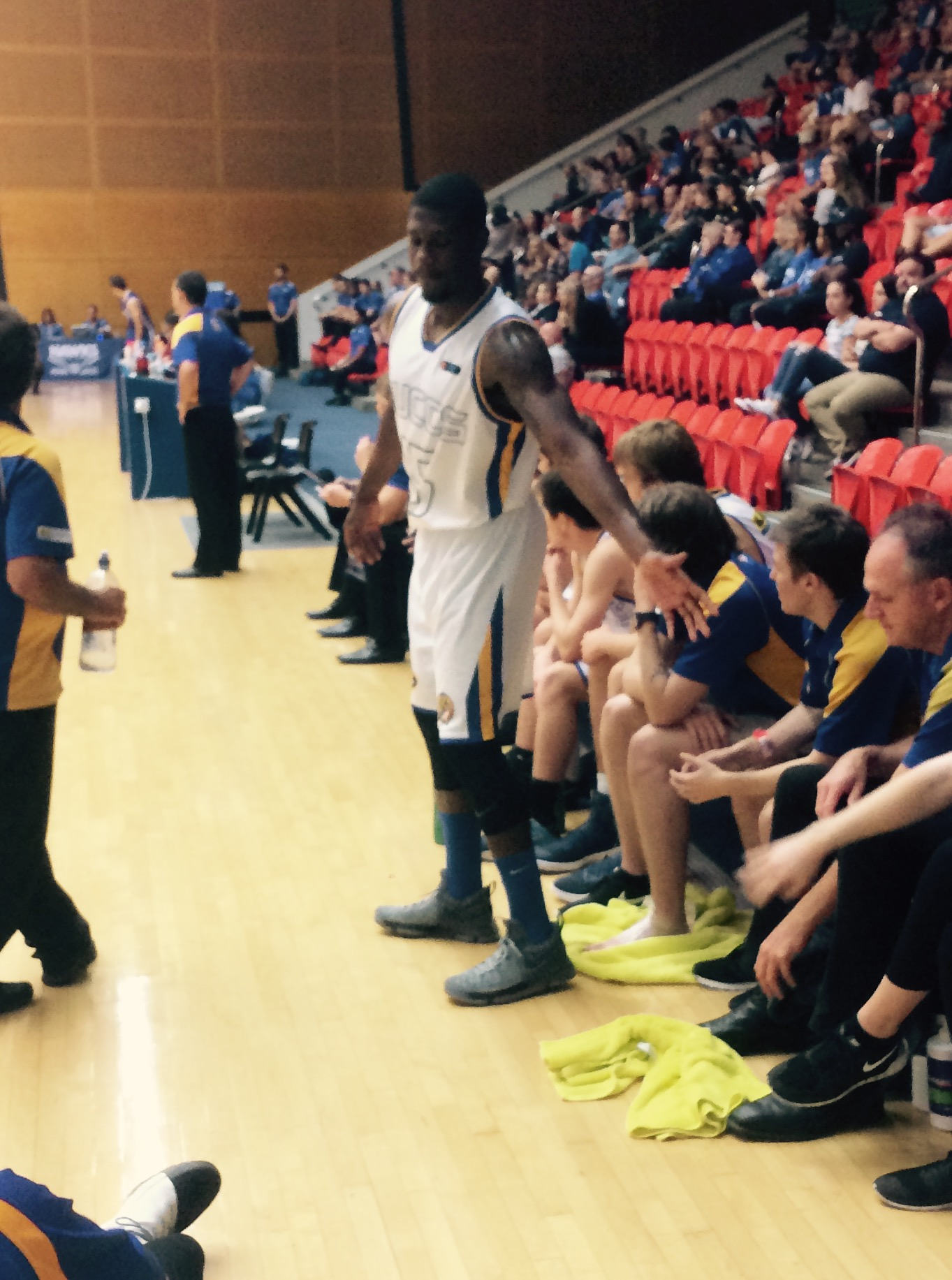
- Barrow with the Geraldton Buccaneers in 2017

Personal information
- Born: January 15, 1992 (age 34) New York City, New York, U.S.
- Listed height: 6 ft 5 in (1.96 m)
- Listed weight: 210 lb (95 kg)

Career information
- High school: Christ the King (Queens, New York)
- College: Fairfield (2010–2014)
- NBA draft: 2014: undrafted
- Playing career: 2014–2019
- Position: Small forward

Career history
- 2014–2015: WBC Wels
- 2016: Geraldton Buccaneers
- 2016: Klosterneuburg Dukes
- 2017: Geraldton Buccaneers
- 2018: Perth Redbacks
- 2019: Willetton Tigers

Career highlights
- 4× SBL All-Defensive Five (2016–2019); 2× SBL All-Star (2016, 2017); Austrian League All-Star (2015); 2× MAAC Sixth Man of the Year (2013, 2014); MAAC All-Rookie Team (2011)

Maurice Barrow (born January 15, 1992) is an American former professional basketball player. He played college basketball for Fairfield University before playing professionally in Austria and Australia.

== High school career ==
Barrow attended Christ the King Regional High School in Queens, New York. As a junior in 2008–09, he led Christ the King to the CHSAA Class AA intersectional championship by tallying a double double in the decisive game. He scored 24 points and grabbed 13 rebounds in the contest, which tied his scoring high in 2008–09. As a senior in 2009–10, he averaged 12.4 points and 6.5 rebounds per game. He capped his final season with several awards, including the CHSAA Class AA championship game most valuable player. Barrow was also named second-team All-CHSAA in his final campaign with Christ the King.

== College career ==
As a freshman at Fairfield in 2010–11, Barrow was twice named MAAC Rookie of the Week and finished the year ranked second among his teammates with 189 total rebounds. He established a personal-best with 16 rebounds in the regular-season finale against Siena, and a career-best 14 points at Niagara and against Canisius. In 33 games for the Stags, he averaged 6.2 points, 5.7 rebounds and 1.3 assists in 25.2 minutes per game. He subsequently earned MAAC All-Rookie Team honors.

As a sophomore in 2011–12, Barrow developed into one of the program's top rebounders, finishing second among his teammates with six rebounds per game. He shot 51 percent from the floor (140-of-275), the top percentage among his teammates with 100 or more made field goals, and finished sixth overall in the MAAC in field goal percentage. He reached 19 points in the season opener against Quinnipiac and later against Marist at home. In 37 games, he also averaged 9.3 points, 2.0 assists and 1.0 steals in 30.4 minutes per game.

As a junior in 2012–13, Barrow was the only Stag to grab more offensive than defensive rebounds, with 70 offensive and 68 defensive rebounds. He contributed both as a starter and as a reserve, getting the nod in the first seven games of the season before coming off the bench for most of the remaining games. On February 4, 2013, he was named MAAC Player of the Week after leading the Stags with a double-double against Rider. In 35 games, he averaged 8.9 points, 3.9 rebounds and 1.1 assists in 26.9 minutes per game. He subsequently earned MAAC Sixth Man of the Year honors.

As a senior in 2013–14, Barrow was the Stags' second leading scorer, averaging 14.0 points coming off the bench. He was also Fairfield's second leading rebounder with 5.1 rebounds per game. Barrow, who averaged 29.3 minutes per game, shot .439 from the floor and .741 from the foul line, also second for the Stags. In his final regular season game, Barrow scored 22 points to climb into 15th place on the Stags all-time scoring list with 1,295 points.

== Professional career ==
=== WBC Wels (2014–2015) ===
In September 2014, Barrow signed with WBC Wels of the Austrian Basketball League for the 2014–15 season. He appeared in 35 of the team's 36 regular season games and helped them finish sixth with a 19–17 record. In their quarter-final match-up with Kapfenberg, Wels were defeated 3–1 despite winning Game 1 of the series. In 39 games for Wels, Barrow averaged 9.8 points, 4.4 rebounds and 1.7 assists per game. During the season, he was selected to the ABL All-Star Game and helped Wels reach the Austrian Cup Final.

=== Geraldton Buccaneers (2016) ===
In December 2015, Barrow signed with the Geraldton Buccaneers for the 2016 State Basketball League season. On April 23, 2016, he recorded 32 points and 13 rebounds in a 96–87 win over the Stirling Senators. He subsequently earned Player of the Week honors for Round 6. On June 4, he scored a season-high 36 points in a 112–93 win over the Goldfields Giants. He helped the Buccaneers finish the regular season in fourth place with an 18–8 record. After sweeping the Rockingham Flames in the quarter-finals, the Buccaneers were themselves swept by the Joondalup Wolves in the semi-finals. Barrow appeared in all 30 games for the Buccaneers, averaging 23.7 points, 8.9 rebounds, 3.1 assists and 1.7 steals per game. During the season, he was selected to the SBL All-Star Game, and at the end-of-season awards night, he was selected to the All-Defensive Five team.

=== Klosterneuburg Dukes (2016) ===
On September 8, 2016, Barrow signed with the Klosterneuburg Dukes for the 2016–17 season, returning to Austria for a second stint. In December 2016, he left Klosterneuburg and returned to Geraldton. In 10 games for Klosterneuburg, he averaged 11.8 points, 4.3 rebounds and 1.2 assists per game.

=== Second stint with the Buccaneers (2017) ===
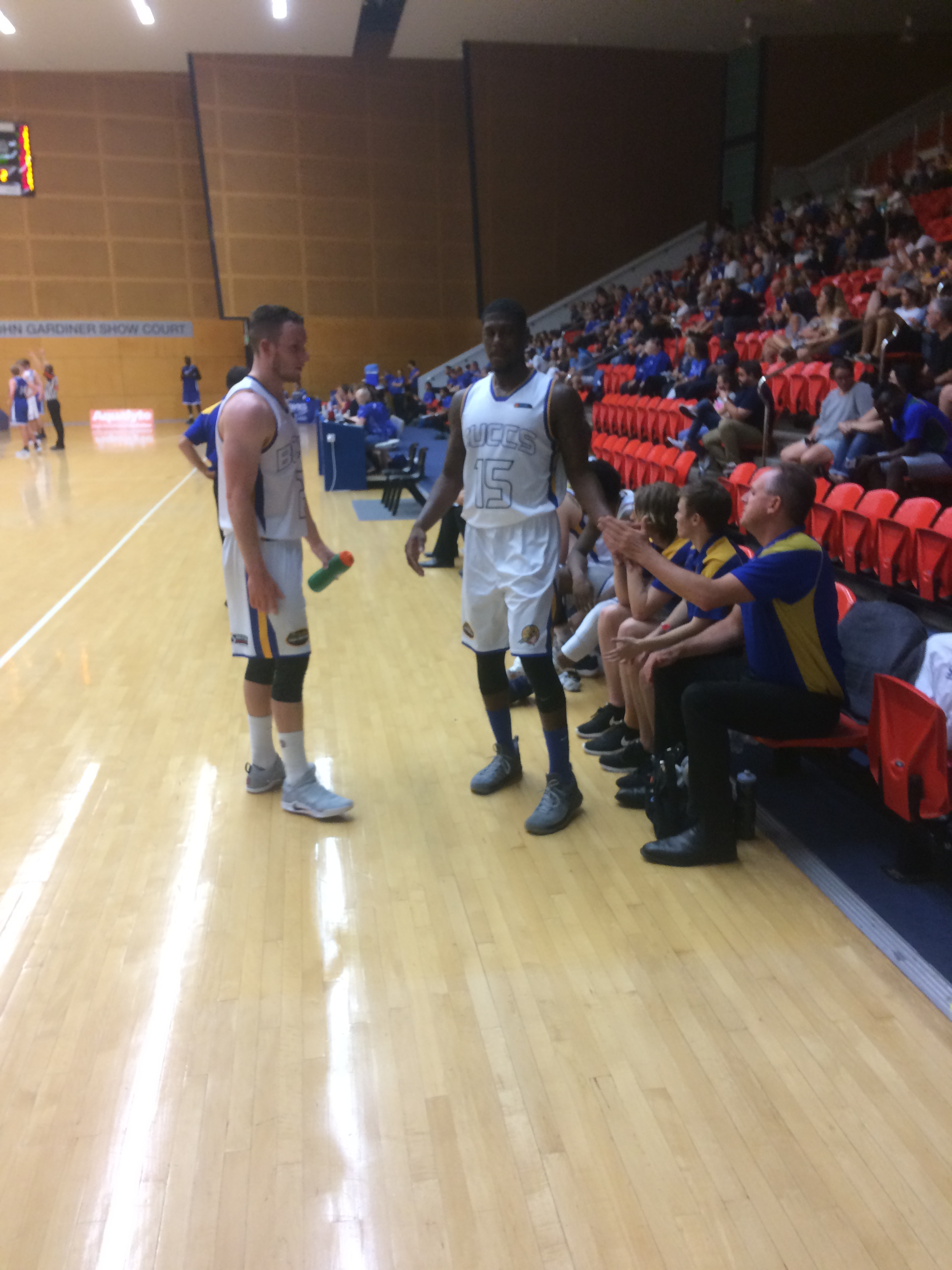
Barrow (#15) with the Buccaneers in April 2017

In January 2017, Barrow re-signed with the Geraldton Buccaneers for the 2017 State Basketball League season. In the Buccaneers' season opener on March 18, Barrow recorded 16 points, a game-high 12 rebounds, six assists, three steals and one block in a 119–84 win over the Kalamunda Eastern Suns. On March 25, he recorded a season-high 29 points, nine rebounds, three blocks and two steals in a 92–69 win over the East Perth Eagles. On July 2, he had a 27-point effort in a 95–94 loss to the Willetton Tigers. He helped the Buccaneers finish the regular season in third place with a 19–7 record. After defeating the Stirling Senators 2–1 in the quarter-finals, the Buccaneers were defeated 2–1 by the Joondalup Wolves in the semi-finals. Barrow appeared in all 32 games for the Buccaneers, averaging 17.0 points, 6.6 rebounds and 2.6 assists per game. During the season, he was selected to the SBL All-Star Game, and at the end-of-season awards night, he was selected to the All-Defensive Five team for the second straight year.

=== Perth Redbacks (2018) ===
On February 5, 2018, Barrow signed with the Perth Redbacks for the 2018 State Basketball League season. In his debut for the Redbacks in their season opener on March 16, 2018, Barrow scored a game-high 33 points to go with nine assists, seven rebounds and four steals in a 102–88 win over the Lakeside Lightning. On April 21, 2018, he recorded 10 points, a season-high 16 rebounds and five assists in an 83–69 loss to the Goldfields Giants. The Redbacks finished the regular season in third place with a 19–7 record, before losing 2–1 to the sixth-seeded Stirling Senators in the quarter-finals. Barrow appeared in all 29 games for the Redbacks in 2018, averaging 16.7 points, 6.2 rebounds and 2.4 assists per game. At the end-of-season awards night, he was selected to the All-Defensive Five team for the third straight year.

=== Willetton Tigers (2019) ===
On October 16, 2018, Barrow signed with the Willetton Tigers for the 2019 State Basketball League season. On June 1, 2019, he scored 36 points in a 101–92 win over the Geraldton Buccaneers. The Tigers missed the finals in 2019 with a ninth-place finish and a 13–13 record. Barrow appeared in all 26 games, averaging 17.65 points, 7.19 and 3.77 assists per game. At the end-of-season awards night, he was selected to the All-Defensive Five team for the fourth straight year.
