= 2015 State Basketball League season =

- League: State Basketball League
- Sport: Basketball
- Duration: 13 March – 25 July (Regular season); 31 July – 29 August (Finals)
- Games: 26 (men); 22 (women)
- Teams: 14 (men); 12 (women)

Regular season
- Minor premiers: M: Joondalup Wolves; W: Rockingham Flames
- Season MVP: M: Ray Turner (Redbacks); W: Sami Whitcomb (Flames)
- Top scorer: M: Ray Turner (Redbacks); W: Sami Whitcomb (Flames)

Finals
- Champions: M: Joondalup Wolves; W: Rockingham Flames
- Runners-up: M: South West Slammers; W: Willetton Tigers
- Grand Final MVP: M: Trian Iliadis (Wolves); W: Sami Whitcomb (Flames)

SBL seasons
- ← 2014 2016 →

The 2015 State Basketball League season was the 27th season of the State Basketball League (SBL). The regular season began on Friday 13 March and ended on Saturday 25 July. The finals began on Friday 31 July and concluded with the women's grand final on Friday 28 August and the men's grand final on Saturday 29 August.

== Pre-season ==
The 2015 SBL Pre-Season Blitz was held at the WA Basketball Centre between Friday 27 February and Sunday 1 March.

== Regular season ==
The regular season began on Friday 13 March and ended on Saturday 25 July after 20 rounds of competition.

=== Standings ===
Men's ladder

Pos
Pos	Team	W	L
1	Joondalup Wolves	23	3
2	Geraldton Buccaneers	20	6
3	South West Slammers	17	9
4	Cockburn Cougars	17	9
5	Rockingham Flames	15	11
6	Willetton Tigers	14	12
7	Goldfields Giants	14	12
8	Perry Lakes Hawks	12	14
9	Mandurah Magic	12	14
10	Stirling Senators	10	16
11	Perth Redbacks	10	16
12	Lakeside Lightning	9	17
13	East Perth Eagles	7	19
14	Kalamunda Eastern Suns	2	24

Women's ladder

Pos
Pos	Team	W	L
1	Rockingham Flames	20	2
2	Willetton Tigers	20	2
3	Joondalup Wolves	18	4
4	Mandurah Magic	15	7
5	Kalamunda Eastern Suns	12	10
6	South West Slammers	10	12
7	Perry Lakes Hawks	10	12
8	Cockburn Cougars	9	13
9	East Perth Eagles	8	14
10	Perth Redbacks	5	17
11	Stirling Senators	4	18
12	Lakeside Lightning	1	21

== Finals ==
The finals began on Friday 31 July and consisted of three rounds. The finals concluded with the women's grand final on Friday 28 August and the men's grand final on Saturday 29 August.

=== Men's bracket ===
Quarter-finals
1	Joondalup Wolves	86	92	109
8	Perry Lakes Hawks	85	94	100
4	Cockburn Cougars	82	116	87
5	Rockingham Flames	91	94	99
2	Geraldton Buccaneers	101	107	X
7	Goldfields Giants	104	114	X
3	South West Slammers	90	88	X
6	Willetton Tigers	83	87	X

Semi-finals
1	Joondalup Wolves	99	119	X
5	Rockingham Flames	88	108	X
7	Goldfields Giants	111	95	X
3	South West Slammers	116	100	X

Grand final
Joondalup Wolves	105	X	X
South West Slammers	75	X	X

==== Grand Final summary ====
29 August 2015
7:30 pm

Box score (original, missing stats)
Box score (with stats)
Report

Joondalup Wolves 105, South West Slammers 75
Scoring by quarter: 26–16, 22–17, 33–15, 24–27
Pts: Trian Iliadis 28; Rebs: Kevin Davis 11; Asts: Seb Salinas 8	Pts: Wade Hitchcock 14; Rebs: Brian Voelkel 19; Asts: Brian Voelkel 9
Joondalup wins SBL Championship

Bendat Basketball Centre, Floreat
MVP: Trian Iliadis (Wolves)

=== Women's bracket ===
Quarter-finals
1	Rockingham Flames	79	82	X
8	Cockburn Cougars	48	61	X
4	Mandurah Magic	64	63	X
5	Kalamunda Eastern Suns	53	51	X
2	Willetton Tigers	69	77	X
7	Perry Lakes Hawks	53	56	X
3	Joondalup Wolves	88	99	X
6	South West Slammers	65	46	X

Semi-finals
1	Rockingham Flames	90	80	X
4	Mandurah Magic	70	51	X
2	Willetton Tigers	82	68	X
3	Joondalup Wolves	68	62	X

Grand final
Rockingham Flames	68	X	X
Willetton Tigers	63	X	X

==== Grand Final summary ====
28 August 2015
7:30 pm

Box score
Report

Rockingham Flames 68, Willetton Tigers 63
Scoring by quarter: 20–15, 12–18, 18–14, 18–16
Pts: Sami Whitcomb 41; Rebs: Lizel Buckley 8 Asts: Talisia Bourne 2	Pts: Louella Tomlinson 14; Rebs: Louella Tomlinson 15; Asts: Louella Tomlinson 6
Rockingham wins SBL Championship

Bendat Basketball Centre, Floreat
MVP: Sami Whitcomb (Flames)

== All-Star games ==
The 2015 SBL All-Star games took place at Bendat Basketball Centre on Monday 1 June, with all proceeds going to Youth Focus to help prevent youth suicide.

=== Men's game ===
==== Rosters ====
South All-Stars
Pos	Player	Team
Starters
F	Nic Cody	Willetton Tigers
F	Gavin Field	Cockburn Cougars
F	Cooper Land	Rockingham Flames
G	Tre Nichols	South West Slammers
G/F	Jordan Swing	Lakeside Lightning
Reserves
G	Najee Lane	Cockburn Cougars
C	Jarrad Prue	Lakeside Lightning
G	Taylor Land	Rockingham Flames
G	Kyle Armour	Willetton Tigers
F	Jacob Holmen	Goldfields Giants
F	Brian Voelkel	South West Slammers
F/C	Taylor Mullenax	Mandurah Magic
Head coach: Ty Harrelson (South West Slammers)

North All-Stars
Pos	Player	Team
Starters
G	Trian Iliadis	Joondalup Wolves
C	Kevin Davis	Joondalup Wolves
G	Seb Salinas	Joondalup Wolves
G/F	Carter Cook	Geraldton Buccaneers
G/F	Bennie Lewis	Geraldton Buccaneers
Reserves
G	Seva Chan	Kalamunda Eastern Suns
G	Sunday Dech	East Perth Eagles
G	Austin Bruton	Stirling Senators
F	Kyle Lindbergh	Stirling Senators
F/C	Mat Wundenberg	Geraldton Buccaneers
F/C	Robert Huntington	Joondalup Wolves
F	Lien Phillip	Kalamunda Eastern Suns
Head coach: Ben Ettridge (Joondalup Wolves)

==== Game data ====
1 June 2015
2:00 pm

Box Score
Report

South 143, North 135
Scoring by quarter: 37–36, 36–35, 38–35, 32–29
Pts: Nichols (26); Rebs: Lane & Prue (8); Asts: Armour (6)	Pts: Lewis (19); Rebs: Phillip (11); Asts: Bruton (5)

Bendat Basketball Centre, Floreat
MVP: Tre Nichols

=== Women's game ===
==== Rosters ====
South All-Stars
Pos	Player	Team
Starters
G/F	Sami Whitcomb	Rockingham Flames
G	Casey Mihovilovich	Mandurah Magic
G	Kate Malpass	Willetton Tigers
C	Louella Tomlinson	Willetton Tigers
F	Darcee Garbin	Rockingham Flames
Reserves
G	Deonica McCormick	South West Slammers
G	Jacinta Bourne	Rockingham Flames
G	Ebony Antonio	Willetton Tigers
F	Ashleigh Grant	Lakeside Lightning
F/C	Patricia Bright	South West Slammers
C	Ashlee Sidebottom	Mandurah Magic
Head coach: Ryan Petrik (Rockingham Flames)

North All-Stars
Pos	Player	Team
Starters
G	Gabriella Clayton	Perth Redbacks
G	Shani Amos	Joondalup Wolves
G/F	Melissa Moyle	Kalamunda Eastern Suns
G	Rebecca Mercer	Joondalup Wolves
C	Kassi Conditt	Perry Lakes Hawks
Reserves
G/F	Tegan Walker	Stirling Senators
F	Jessica Jakens	Perth Redbacks
G	Kelsey Maffin	East Perth Eagles
F/C	Danika Pisconeri	Perry Lakes Hawks
C	Amber Land	Stirling Senators
F	Jessie Edwards	Kalamunda Eastern Suns
Head coach: Vlad Alava (Joondalup Wolves)

==== Game data ====
1 June 2015
12:00 pm

Box Score
Report

South 87, North 76
Scoring by quarter: 21–30, 23–16, 15–11, 28–19
Pts: Garbin (21); Rebs: Tomlinson & Garbin (11); Asts: Mihovilovich & McCormick (4)	Pts: Clayton (22); Rebs: Land (10); Asts: Amos (3)

Bendat Basketball Centre, Floreat
MVP: Gabriella Clayton

== Awards ==
=== Player of the Week ===
Round	Men's Player	Team	Women's Player	Team	Ref
1	Kevin Davis	Joondalup Wolves	Deanna Smith	Cockburn Cougars	
2	Marshall Brown	Perth Redbacks	Deanna Smith	Cockburn Cougars	
3	Najee Lane	Cockburn Cougars	Deonica McCormick	South West Slammers	
4	Tre Nichols	South West Slammers	Sami Whitcomb	Rockingham Flames	
5	Ray Turner	Perth Redbacks	Casey Mihovilovich	Mandurah Magic	
6	Gavin Field	Cockburn Cougars	Megan McKay	Perry Lakes Hawks	
7	Ray Turner	Perth Redbacks	Casey Mihovilovich	Mandurah Magic	
8	Jordan Swing	Lakeside Lightning	Louella Tomlinson	Willetton Tigers	
9	Gavin Field	Cockburn Cougars	Louella Tomlinson	Willetton Tigers	
10	Bryton Hobbs	Perry Lakes Hawks	Katie Loberg	Cockburn Cougars	
11	Gavin Field	Cockburn Cougars	Darcee Garbin	Rockingham Flames	
12	Drew Williamson	East Perth Eagles	Deonica McCormick	South West Slammers	
13	Rhys Vague	East Perth Eagles	Jacinta Bourne	Rockingham Flames	
14	Bryton Hobbs	Perry Lakes Hawks	Kate Malpass	Willetton Tigers	
15	Bennie Lewis	Geraldton Buccaneers	Rebecca Mercer	Joondalup Wolves	
16	Jay Bowie	Goldfields Giants	Deanna Smith	Cockburn Cougars	
17	Ty Harrelson	South West Slammers	Sami Whitcomb	Rockingham Flames	
18	Jacob Holmen	Goldfields Giants	Louella Tomlinson	Willetton Tigers	
19	Tre Nichols	South West Slammers	Deonica McCormick	South West Slammers	
20	Ray Turner	Perth Redbacks	Emma Klasztorny	Mandurah Magic	

=== Statistics leaders ===
Category	Men's Player	Team	Stat	Women's Player	Team	Stat
Points per game	Ray Turner	Perth Redbacks	31.23	Sami Whitcomb	Rockingham Flames	25.52
Rebounds per game	Jarrad Prue	Lakeside Lightning	17.50	Amber Land	Stirling Senators	12.73
Assists per game	Brian Voelkel	South West Slammers	7.68	Deanna Smith	Cockburn Cougars	5.45
Steals per game	Najee Lane	Cockburn Cougars	2.80	Casey Mihovilovich	Mandurah Magic	3.95
Blocks per game	Kevin Davis	Joondalup Wolves	2.93	Louella Tomlinson	Willetton Tigers	4.90
Field goal percentage	Kevin Davis	Joondalup Wolves	64.1%	Darcee Garbin; Katie Loberg	Rockingham Flames; Cockburn Cougars	51.2%
3-pt field goal percentage	Austin Bruton	Stirling Senators	42.9%	Rebecca Mercer	Joondalup Wolves	45.3%
Free throw percentage	Gavin Field	Cockburn Cougars	91.1%	Deanna Smith	Cockburn Cougars	88.4%

=== Regular season ===
- Men's Most Valuable Player: Ray Turner (Perth Redbacks)
- Women's Most Valuable Player: Sami Whitcomb (Rockingham Flames)
- Men's Coach of the Year: Matt Parsons (Cockburn Cougars)
- Women's Coach of the Year: Randy Miegel (Mandurah Magic)
- Men's Most Improved Player: Rhys Vague (East Perth Eagles)
- Women's Most Improved Player: Ashleigh Grant (Lakeside Lightning)
- Men's All-Star Five:
  - PG: Tre Nichols (South West Slammers)
  - SG: Jordan Swing (Lakeside Lightning)
  - SF: Bennie Lewis (Geraldton Buccaneers)
  - PF: Gavin Field (Cockburn Cougars)
  - C: Ray Turner (Perth Redbacks)
- Women's All-Star Five:
  - PG: Kate Malpass (Willetton Tigers)
  - SG: Casey Mihovilovich (Mandurah Magic)
  - SF: Sami Whitcomb (Rockingham Flames)
  - PF: Deanna Smith (Cockburn Cougars)
  - C: Louella Tomlinson (Willetton Tigers)

=== Finals ===
- Men's Grand Final MVP: Trian Iliadis (Joondalup Wolves)
- Women's Grand Final MVP: Sami Whitcomb (Rockingham Flames)
