= Ray Turner (basketball) =

American basketball player

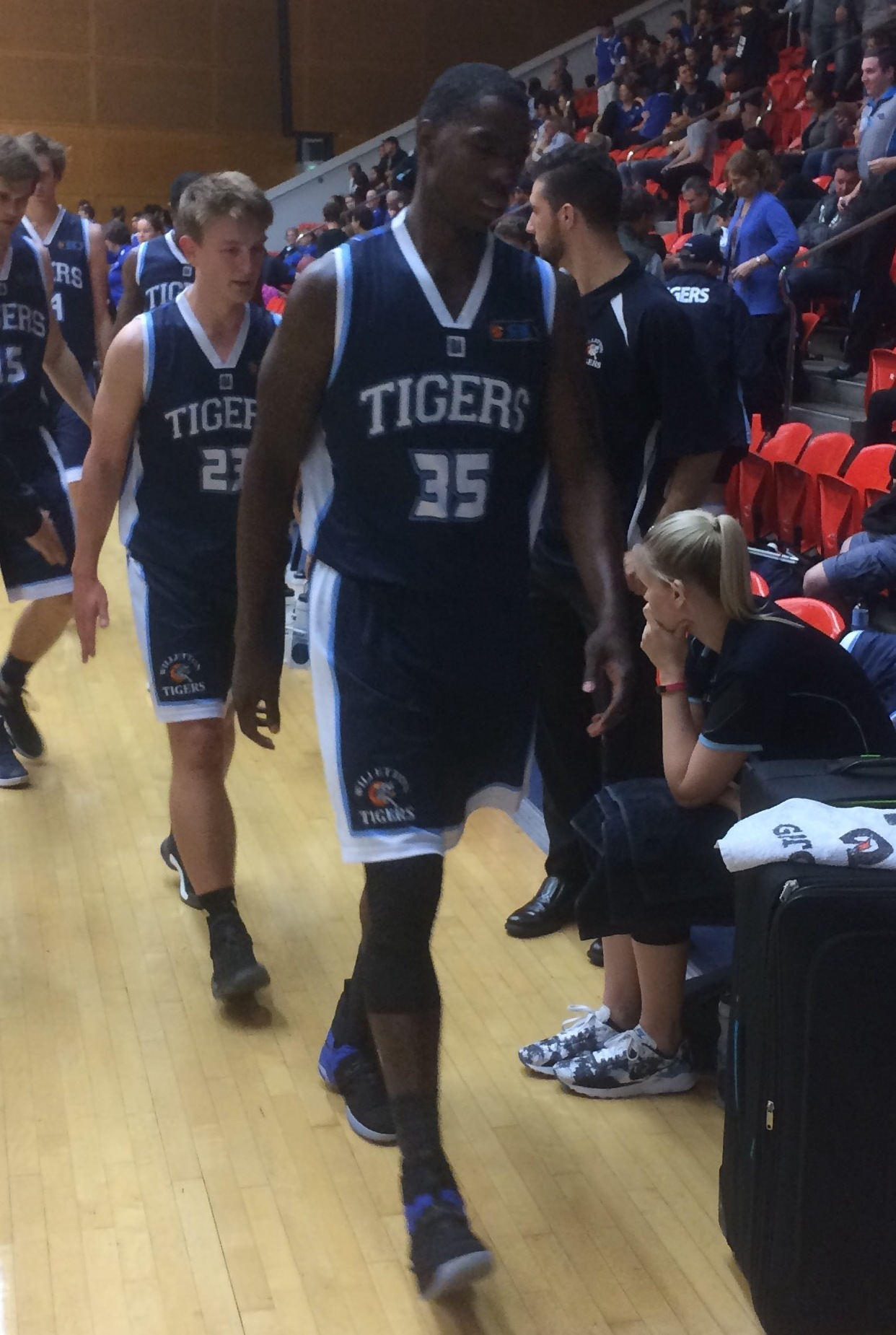
- Turner with the Willetton Tigers in 2017

No. 35 – Bendigo Braves
- Position: Power forward / center
- League: NBL1 South

Personal information
- Born: January 24, 1990 (age 36) Houston, Texas, U.S.
- Listed height: 6 ft 9 in (2.06 m)
- Listed weight: 230 lb (104 kg)

Career information
- High school: Jones (Houston, Texas)
- College: Texas A&M (2009–2013)
- NBA draft: 2013: undrafted
- Playing career: 2013–present

Career history
- 2013: Apollon Limassol
- 2014: Rockhampton Rockets
- 2015: Perth Redbacks
- 2015–2016: Akita Northern Happinets
- 2016: Rockhampton Rockets
- 2016: Falco KC Szombathely
- 2017: Willetton Tigers
- 2018–2019: Bendigo Braves
- 2019: Sydney Kings
- 2021: Bendigo Braves
- 2022–2023: Mandurah Magic
- 2026–present: Bendigo Braves

Career highlights
- NBL1 All-Star Five (2019); All-SEABL First Team (2018); SBL MVP (2015); 2× SBL All-Star Five (2015, 2017); SBL scoring champion (2015); QBL champion (2014); QBL All-League Team (2014)

Ray Lee Turner (born January 24, 1990) is an American professional basketball player for the Bendigo Braves of the NBL1 South. He played college basketball for Texas A&M University before playing professionally in Cyprus, Australia, Japan and Hungary. During his first two years in Australia, Turner won a QBL championship with the Rockhampton Rockets and was named the SBL Most Valuable Player with the Perth Redbacks.

== Early life and high school ==
Turner was born in Houston, Texas, and grew up in the south-central area of South Park without a father and with a sick mother. As an adolescent, Turner missed a lot of school and was often getting into trouble, but basketball provided a positive outlet. He attended South Park BallCats, a basketball academy run by Turner's guardian and father figure Keith Perry.

Turner attended South Park's Jesse H. Jones High School, where as a junior in 2007–08, he averaged 16.0 points, 9.5 rebounds and 4.5 blocks per game for the school's basketball team. As a senior in 2008–09, he averaged 16.5 points and earned district MVP honors in addition to being named to the all-state and all-region teams. He also played in the THSCA All-Star Game as a senior and led his team to a 29–7 record and the district title.

== College career ==
After he was initially deemed ineligible to play college basketball by the NCAA to begin the 2009–10 season, Turner began practicing with the Texas A&M Aggies in December 2009 and appeared in the final 20 games of the season off the bench. He averaged 2.9 points and 2.6 rebounds in just under 10 minutes per game. On February 3, 2010, he recorded four points and two offensive rebounds in a win over Missouri, including a slam dunk that made ESPN's top 10 plays list and was voted the Big 12 Play of the Week.

As a sophomore in 2010–11, Turner appeared in 32 games, starting one, and averaged 13.4 minutes, 4.0 points and 3.2 rebounds per game. He also led the team in blocks and was fifth in rebounds. In his first career start on February 26, 2011, he recorded six points and four rebounds in a loss to Baylor.

As a junior in 2011–12, Turner appeared in all 32 games, starting 16, and averaged 21.6 minutes, 9.1 points and a team-high 5.5 rebounds per game. He was also the team leader in field-goal percentage (118-of-206, 57.3 percent) and ranked second in blocks (14). In the first two games of the season, he had two 20-point outings for the first time in his career, and on December 7, he recorded his first career double-double with 15 points and 10 rebounds in a win over Sam Houston.

As a senior in 2012–13, Turner played all 33 games and started all but one. He averaged 23.4 minutes per game and recorded three double-doubles to give him seven for his career. He also compiled 303 points to finish third on the squad with 9.2 per game and pulled down 206 rebounds to average 6.2 per game. He finished with 536 career rebounds, the 20th most in program history. On November 15, he scored a season-high 17 points in a win over Prairie View A&M.

=== College statistics ===
Year	Team	GP	GS	MPG	FG%	3P%	FT%	RPG	APG	SPG	BPG	PPG
2009–10	Texas A&M	20	0	9.8	.590	.000	.500	2.6	.0	.3	.6	2.9
2010–11	Texas A&M	32	1	13.4	.462	.000	.603	3.2	.2	.2	.5	4.0
2011–12	Texas A&M	32	16	21.6	.573	.000	.607	5.5	.3	.4	.4	9.1
2012–13	Texas A&M	33	32	23.4	.515	.000	.627	6.2	.2	.4	.7	9.2
Career		117	49	17.9	.533	.000	.605	4.6	.2	.3	.6	6.6

== Professional career ==
=== Uruguay and Cyprus (2013) ===
After going undrafted in the 2013 NBA draft, Turner spent time in Uruguay during the Liga Uruguaya de Basketball pre-season. He had a stint with Atlético Bigua and Atlético Olimpia. He signed with Apollon Limassol in Cyprus and in his short time averaged 7.3 points and 7.0 rebounds in seven games. He left the team due to non-payment.

=== Rockhampton Rockets (2014) ===
On February 20, 2014, Turner signed with the Rockhampton Rockets in Australia for the 2014 Queensland Basketball League season. He helped the Rockets win the minor premiership with a 14–2 record before advancing through to the QBL Grand Final series, where they swept the Mackay Meteors 2–0 to win the championship. Turner was named MVP of game two after recording 31 points and 15 rebounds. In 19 games for the Rockets, he averaged 20.5 points, 12.8 rebounds, 1.7 assists and 1.4 blocks per game, while shooting 64.1% from the floor. He was subsequently named in the QBL All-League Team.

=== Injured off-season ===
On November 1, 2014, Turner was selected by the Los Angeles D-Fenders in the third round of the 2014 NBA Development League Draft. However, he was unable to compete due to injury and was waived on November 12 prior to the start of the regular season. On November 28, he signed a trial contract with German team Phoenix Hagen. Due to an injury suffered at training, Turner returned to the United States the day he was scheduled to debut for the team.

=== Perth Redbacks (2015) ===
In February 2015, Turner returned to Australia, signing with the Perth Redbacks for the 2015 State Basketball League season. In his debut for the Redbacks on March 14, Turner recorded 32 points and 30 rebounds in an 84–72 season-opening loss to the Stirling Senators. In April, he had three games with 45 points or more, including a 58-point effort along with 26 rebounds in a 123–120 double-overtime loss to the Willetton Tigers on April 27. On May 15, he scored 50 points in a 121–114 loss to the Cockburn Cougars. In the Redbacks' season finale on July 25, Turner recorded 38 points and 20 rebounds in a 115–102 win over the South West Slammers. He subsequently earned Player of the Week honors for a third time. The Redbacks failed to qualify for the playoffs, finishing in 11th place with a 10–16 record. Turner appeared in all 26 games and averaged a league-leading 31.2 points, 16.1 rebounds (fourth in the league), 1.3 assists and 1.8 blocks per game. He was subsequently named the SBL MVP.

=== Tour team (2015) ===
In August 2015, Turner joined New Zealand team the Wellington Saints for their Asian tour, playing in Taiwan at the William Jones Cup and in the Philippines at the MVP Cup.

=== Akita Northern Happinets (2015–2016) ===
Turner joined the Akita Northern Happinets of the Japanese bj league for the 2015–16 season. In his debut for the Northern Happinets on October 3, Turner had 11 rebounds in a 77–56 season-opening win over the Saitama Broncos. On October 10, he recorded 32 points and 10 rebounds in an 86–77 loss to the Gunma Crane Thunders. On January 24, 2016, he competed in the league's Slam Dunk Contest. On February 13, he recorded 31 points and 18 rebounds in a 78–68 win over the Gunma Crane Thunders. On February 21, he recorded 26 points and 21 rebounds in an 89–82 loss to the Toyama Grouses. In the regular-season finale on April 24, Turner had 31 points on 13-for-17 shooting and 16 rebounds in a 100–82 win over the Sendai 89ers. The Northern Happinets finished the regular season in third place in the Eastern Conference with a 35–17 record. They went on to reach the Eastern Conference final, where they were defeated 99–84 by the Toyama Grouses despite a 15-point effort from Turner. In 54 games on the season, Turner averaged 15.7 points, 10.0 rebounds, 1.2 assists, 1.2 steals and 1.0 blocks per game.

=== Second stint with Rockhampton (2016) ===
On June 8, 2016, Turner joined the Rockhampton Rockets for the rest of the 2016 Queensland Basketball League season, returning to the club for a second stint. Two days later, he made his season debut for the Rockets, recording 24 points and 14 rebounds in an 82–71 win over the Sunshine Coast Rip. On July 23, he scored a season-high 31 points in a 103–100 loss to the Gladstone Port City Power. In the Rockets' season finale on August 5, Turner recorded 28 points and 14 rebounds in a 116–111 loss to the Ipswich Force. The loss gave the Rockets a 9–8 record for the season, as they missed the playoffs for the first time in 14 years. In 11 games for the Rockets in 2016, Turner averaged 22.5 points, 12.3 rebounds, 1.3 steals and 1.7 blocks per game.

=== Falco KC Szombathely (2016) ===
On August 10, 2016, Turner signed with Falco KC Szombathely of the Hungarian League. On November 29, he had a season-best game with 14 points and nine rebounds in an 85–69 win over BC Körmend. On December 22, his contract was terminated by Falco in a mutual agreement. In 11 games, he averaged 9.4 points and 5.2 rebounds per game.

=== Willetton Tigers (2017) ===
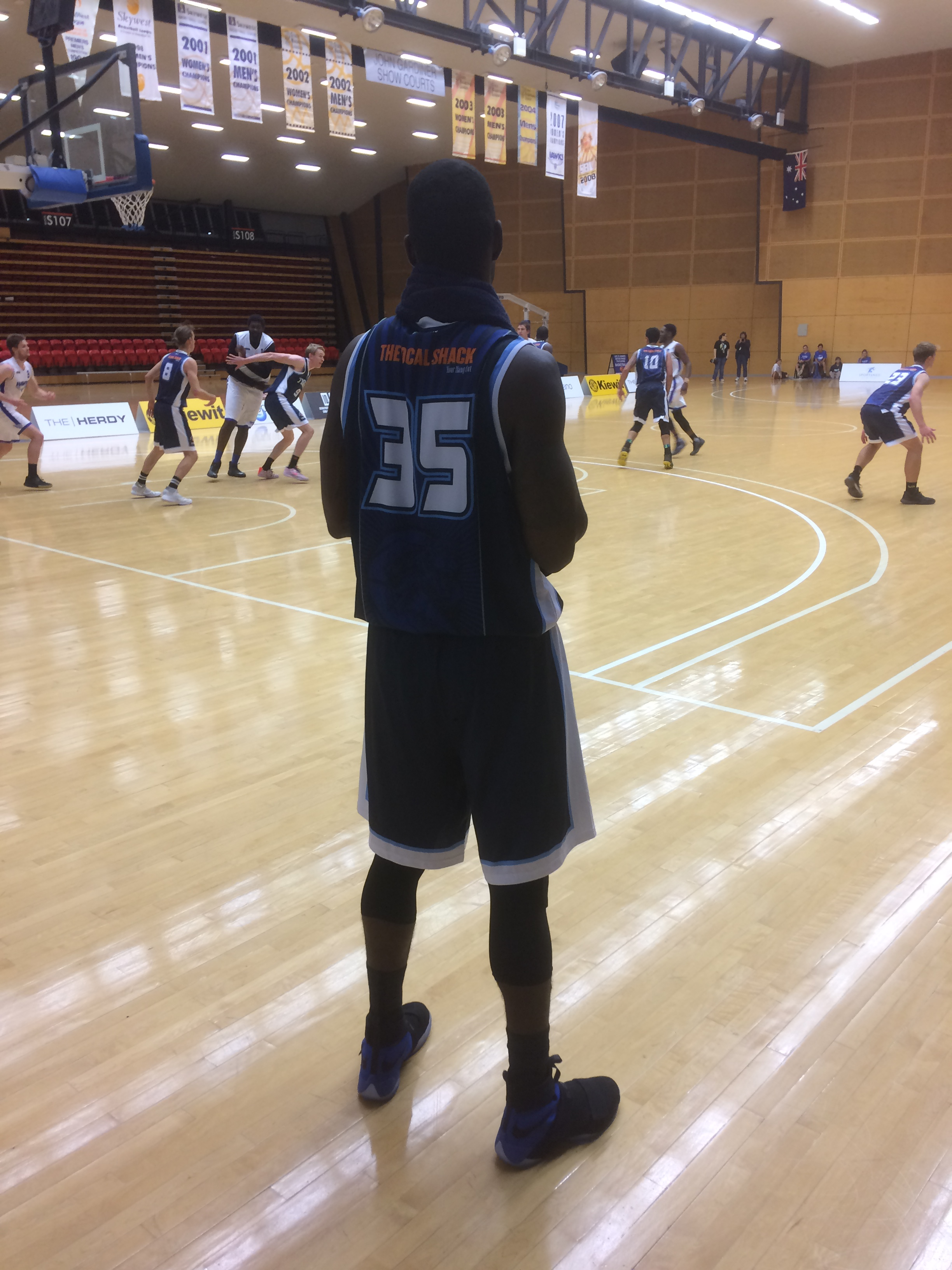
Turner with the Tigers in April 2017, donning his traditional #35

On February 10, 2017, Turner signed with the Willetton Tigers for the 2017 SBL season, returning to the league for a second stint. After missing the Tigers' first two games of the season due to a knee injury, Turner made his debut for Willetton on April 1 against the Geraldton Buccaneers. In 37 minutes, he recorded 32 points and 20 rebounds in a 95–83 win. On May 6, he recorded 43 points and 24 rebounds in a 120–118 double-overtime win over the Cockburn Cougars. He was subsequently named Player of the Week for Round 8. On July 2, he recorded 29 points and 20 rebounds in a 95–94 win over Geraldton. Five days later, he recorded a game-high 34 points and 14 rebounds in a 99–92 win over the South West Slammers. Turner helped the Tigers finish the regular season as minor premiers with a 20–6 record. After defeating the Perry Lakes Hawks 2–1 in the quarter-finals, the Tigers faced the Perth Redbacks in the semi-finals, where they were swept 2–0 despite Turner's 26 points and 13 rebounds in a 101–92 loss in game two. In 28 games for the Tigers, he averaged 25.2 points, 12.3 rebounds and 1.5 assists per game.

=== Bendigo Braves and Sydney Kings (2018–2021) ===
On December 27, 2017, Turner signed with the Bendigo Braves of the South East Australian Basketball League (SEABL) for the 2018 season. In the Braves' season opener on April 6, 2018, Turner scored 20 points in a 78–77 win over the Diamond Valley Eagles. On April 27, he recorded 25 points and 25 rebounds in an 89–75 win over the Mount Gambier Pioneers. Two days later, he had a team-high 21 points to go with a game-high 16 rebounds in a 93–72 win over the Albury Wodonga Bandits. He was subsequently named SEABL Player of the Week for Round 4. On May 5, he scored a season-high 32 points in an 88–72 win over the Canberra Gunners. On May 11, he was named SEABL Player of the Month for April. On June 23, he set a new season high with 39 points in a 102–94 overtime win over the Bandits. The Braves finished the regular season in seventh place with an 11–9 record. In their elimination final, Turner recorded 37 points and 11 rebounds in a 97–75 win over the BA Centre of Excellence. They went on to lose their semi-final against the Kilsyth Cobras 111–88 despite Turner's 27 points and nine rebounds. He appeared in all 22 games for the Braves in 2018, averaging 22.6 points, 11.0 rebounds and 1.1 assists per game.

On January 15, 2019, after practising with the team for two weeks, Turner signed with the Sydney Kings for the rest of the 2018–19 NBL season. In his debut for the Kings four days later, Turner recorded two points, two rebounds and one block in 7:16 off the bench before fouling out in what was a 119–99 loss to the Adelaide 36ers. It was the fastest foul out in a debut game in NBL history. On January 27, he scored eight points in just under eight minutes off the bench in an 88–68 loss to the Perth Wildcats. The Kings finished the regular season in third place with an 18–10 record before losing 2–0 to Melbourne United in the semi-finals, despite Turner's 12 points off the bench in game two. In 10 games, he averaged 4.5 points and 2.1 rebounds per game.

Following the conclusion of the Kings' season, Turner re-joined the Bendigo Braves in the NBL1 for the 2019 season. The Braves finished the regular season in eighth place and went on to reach the NBL1 grand final behind Turner's 16 points and 13 rebounds in their preliminary final win over the Frankston Blues. In the grand final, the Braves lost 99–90 to the Nunawading Spectres despite Turner's 24 points. For the season, he was named to the NBL1 All-Star Five. In 23 games, he averaged 23.4 points, 12.3 rebounds, 1.7 assists, 1.2 steals and 1.3 blocks per game.

On November 22, 2019, Turner re-signed with the Braves for the 2020 NBL1 season. However, the season was cancelled due to the COVID-19 pandemic.

On February 23, 2021, Turner re-signed with the Braves, now in the NBL1 South, for the 2021 NBL1 season. In 15 games, he averaged 24.2 points, 10.6 rebounds and 1.2 steals per game.

=== Mandurah Magic (2022–2023) ===
On November 9, 2021, Turner signed with the Mandurah Magic of the NBL1 West for the 2022 season. In 22 games, he averaged 15.0 points and 8.6 rebounds per game.

On February 25, 2023, Turner re-signed with the Magic for the 2023 NBL1 West season. In 21 games, he averaged 19.8 points and 10.6 rebounds per game.

=== Bendigo Braves (2026–present) ===
In March 2026, Turner signed with the Bendigo Braves of the NBL1 South for the 2026 NBL1 season, returning to the team for a second stint.

== Personal life ==
Turner wears No. 35 in honor of good friend and 2010 Aggie signee Tobi Oyedeji, who was killed in a Houston car accident in May 2010.

Turner's wife, Gabby (née Clayton), is Australian. She too is a basketball player. The couple have a son.

In April 2020, Turner received Australian permanent resident status.

While in Mandurah, Turner began working in real estate.
