= 2016 State Basketball League season =

- League: State Basketball League
- Sport: Basketball
- Duration: 18 March – 30 July (Regular season); 5 August – 3 September (Finals)
- Number of games: 26 (men); 22 (women)
- Number of teams: 14 (men); 12 (women)

Regular season
- Minor premiers: M: Cockburn Cougars; W: Joondalup Wolves
- Season MVP: M: Cooper Land (Flames); W: Alison Schwagmeyer (Lightning)
- Top scorer: M: Tre Nichols (Slammers); W: Candace Williams (Cougars)

Finals
- Champions: M: Cockburn Cougars; W: Willetton Tigers
- Runners-up: M: Joondalup Wolves; W: Joondalup Wolves
- Grand Final MVP: M: Rhett Della Maddalena (Cougars); W: Kate Malpass (Tigers)

SBL seasons
- ← 2015 2017 →

The 2016 State Basketball League season was the 28th season of the State Basketball League (SBL). The regular season began on Friday 18 March and ended on Saturday 30 July. The finals began on Friday 5 August and concluded with the women's grand final on Friday 2 September and the men's grand final on Saturday 3 September.

== Pre-season ==
The 2016 SBL Pre-Season Blitz was held at Warwick Stadium over Saturday 5 March and Sunday 6 March.

== Regular season ==
The regular season began on Friday 18 March and ended on Saturday 30 July after 20 rounds of competition.

The Stirling Senators entered the 2016 season with a renovated Warwick Stadium, while the Perth Redbacks moved home to the Belmont Oasis Leisure Centre after a trial year at Curtin University in 2015. Additionally, due to renovations to the Mandurah Aquatic and Recreation Centre, the Mandurah Magic hosted all of their games in 2016 at the Rockingham Flames' home venue of Mike Barnett Sports Complex.

=== Standings ===
Men's ladder

Pos
Pos	Team	W	L
1	Cockburn Cougars	22	4
2	Joondalup Wolves	21	5
3	Willetton Tigers	18	8
4	Geraldton Buccaneers	18	8
5	Rockingham Flames	17	9
6	Stirling Senators	17	9
7	Perth Redbacks	15	11
8	Perry Lakes Hawks	11	15
9	East Perth Eagles	10	16
10	South West Slammers	8	18
11	Lakeside Lightning	7	19
12	Goldfields Giants	7	19
13	Kalamunda Eastern Suns	6	20
14	Mandurah Magic	5	21

Women's ladder

Pos
Pos	Team	W	L
1	Joondalup Wolves	19	3
2	Rockingham Flames	18	4
3	Willetton Tigers	17	5
4	Perry Lakes Hawks	15	7
5	Mandurah Magic	12	10
6	Lakeside Lightning	11	11
7	Perth Redbacks	10	12
8	Cockburn Cougars	9	13
9	Kalamunda Eastern Suns	9	13
10	Stirling Senators	8	14
11	East Perth Eagles	2	20
12	South West Slammers	2	20

== Finals ==
The finals began on Friday 5 August and consisted of three rounds. The finals concluded with the women's grand final on Friday 2 September and the men's grand final on Saturday 3 September.

=== Men's bracket ===
Quarter-finals
1	Cockburn Cougars	109	85	130
8	Perry Lakes Hawks	104	96	115
4	Geraldton Buccaneers	107	107	X
5	Rockingham Flames	105	101	X
2	Joondalup Wolves	110	103	X
7	Perth Redbacks	95	78	X
3	Willetton Tigers	110	103	X
6	Stirling Senators	97	99	X

Semi-finals
1	Cockburn Cougars	100	92	X
4	Geraldton Buccaneers	96	86	X
2	Joondalup Wolves	122	99	110
3	Willetton Tigers	103	128	95

Grand final
Cockburn Cougars	96	X	X
Joondalup Wolves	84	X	X

==== Grand Final summary ====
3 September 2016
7:30 pm

Box score
Report
Highlights
Game replay part 1
Game replay part 2
Game replay part 3

Cockburn Cougars 96, Joondalup Wolves 84
Scoring by quarter: 26–17, 25–19, 20–24, 25–24
Pts: Najee Lane 24; Rebs: Marcus Goode 15; Asts: McIntyre, Thomas 4 each	Pts: Kevin Davis 20; Rebs: Kevin Davis 14; Asts: Questel, Maxwell 4 each
Cockburn wins SBL Championship

Bendat Basketball Centre, Floreat
MVP: Rhett Della Maddalena (Cougars)

=== Women's bracket ===
Quarter-finals
1	Joondalup Wolves	84	84	X
8	Cockburn Cougars	67	63	X
4	Perry Lakes Hawks	71	65	71
5	Mandurah Magic	69	73	69
2	Rockingham Flames	90	77	X
7	Perth Redbacks	66	56	X
3	Willetton Tigers	101	78	X
6	Lakeside Lightning	58	66	X

Semi-finals
1	Joondalup Wolves	80	56	74
4	Perry Lakes Hawks	50	60	49
2	Rockingham Flames	59	76	50
3	Willetton Tigers	82	62	54

Grand final
Joondalup Wolves	58	X	X
Willetton Tigers	60	X	X

==== Grand Final summary ====
2 September 2016
7:30 pm

Box score
Report

Joondalup Wolves 58, Willetton Tigers 60
Scoring by quarter: 12–14, 21–22, 13–10, 12–14
Pts: Klara Wischer 20; Rebs: Klara Wischer 13; Asts: Klara Wischer 3	Pts: Kate Malpass 28; Rebs: Ebony Antonio 13; Asts: Tomlinson, Antonio 3 each
Willetton wins SBL Championship

Bendat Basketball Centre, Floreat
MVP: Kate Malpass (Tigers)

== All-Star games ==
The 2016 SBL All-Star games took place at Bendat Basketball Centre on Monday 6 June, with all proceeds going to Lifeline WA for suicide prevention.

=== Men's game ===
==== Rosters ====
North All-Stars
Pos	Player	Team
Starters
C	Kevin Davis	Joondalup Wolves
F	Maurice Barrow	Geraldton Buccaneers
G/F	Jourdan DeMuynck	Perth Redbacks
F	Ben Purser	Perry Lakes Hawks
F	Rhys Vague	East Perth Eagles
Reserves
F	Bobby Evans	Joondalup Wolves
G	Joel Wagner	Perth Redbacks
F	Thomas Korf	East Perth Eagles
G	Jayden Coburn	Stirling Senators
F	Kyle Lindbergh	Stirling Senators
G	Timothy Squire	Kalamunda Eastern Suns
Head coach: Ben Ettridge (Joondalup Wolves)

South All-Stars
Pos	Player	Team
Starters
G/F	Kenny Manigault	Goldfields Giants
G	Najee Lane	Cockburn Cougars
G	Tre Nichols	South West Slammers
F	Jacob Holmen	Goldfields Giants
F/C	T. J. Hallice	Lakeside Lightning
Reserves
G	Damien Scott	Willetton Tigers
F	Gavin Field	Cockburn Cougars
G/F	Jay Bowie	Willetton Tigers
F	Daniel Alexander	Lakeside Lightning
F	Cooper Land	Rockingham Flames
F	Trevor Setty	Mandurah Magic
Head coach: Matt Parsons (Cockburn Cougars)

==== Game data ====
6 June 2016
2:00 pm

Box Score
Report #1
Report #2

North 104, South 116
Scoring by quarter: 31–37, 24–27, 23–28, 26–24
Pts: Vague (21); Rebs: Lindbergh (10); Asts: Vague (4)	Pts: Holmen (21); Rebs: Setty (12); Asts: Nichols (6)

Bendat Basketball Centre, Floreat
MVP: Najee Lane

=== Women's game ===
==== Rosters ====
South All-Stars
Pos	Player	Team
Starters
G	Casey Mihovilovich	Mandurah Magic
C	Adijat Adams	Mandurah Magic
G	Courtney Byrnes	Lakeside Lightning
F	Candace Williams	Cockburn Cougars
G	Dena English	South West Slammers
Reserves
F	Courtney Bayliss	South West Slammers
G	Rachel Halleen	Mandurah Magic
F	Cherridy Thornton	Cockburn Cougars
F	Ashleigh Grant	Lakeside Lightning
F	Ashlee Sidebottom	Rockingham Flames
Head coach: Ryan Petrik (Rockingham Flames)

North All-Stars
Pos	Player	Team
Starters
G	Stacey Barr	Kalamunda Eastern Suns
G	Adrienne Jones	Perth Redbacks
F/C	Amber Land	Stirling Senators
G/F	Taylor Bestry	Stirling Senators
F	Klara Wischer	Joondalup Wolves
Reserves
G	Lauren Jeffers	Perry Lakes Hawks
F	Jessica Jakens	Perth Redbacks
G	Rebecca Benson	Perth Redbacks
G	Nicole Jorre St Jorre	East Perth Eagles
F	Nikita-Lee Martin	Joondalup Wolves
G	Shani Amos	Joondalup Wolves
Head coach: Craig Friday (Joondalup Wolves)

==== Game data ====
6 June 2016
12:00 pm

Box Score
Report

South 70, North 93
Scoring by quarter: 18–21, 14–25, 25–30, 13–17
Pts: Williams (16); Rebs: Williams (16); Asts: English (4)	Pts: Wischer (17); Rebs: Jakens (11); Asts: Amos (6)

Bendat Basketball Centre, Floreat
MVP: Klara Wischer

== Awards ==
=== Player of the Week ===
Round	Men's Player	Team	Women's Player	Team	Ref
1	Cooper Land	Rockingham Flames	Kate Malpass	Willetton Tigers	
2	Jacob Holmen	Goldfields Giants	Sami Whitcomb	Rockingham Flames	
3	Rhys Vague	East Perth Eagles	Stacey Barr	Kalamunda Eastern Suns	
4	Tre Nichols	South West Slammers	Deanna Smith	Perry Lakes Hawks	
5	Daniel Alexander	Lakeside Lightning	Candace Williams	Cockburn Cougars	
6	Maurice Barrow	Geraldton Buccaneers	Candace Williams	Cockburn Cougars	
7	Matthew Adekponya	Geraldton Buccaneers	Klara Wischer	Joondalup Wolves	
8	Trian Iliadis	Joondalup Wolves	Louella Tomlinson	Willetton Tigers	
9	Tom Jervis	East Perth Eagles	Stacey Barr	Kalamunda Eastern Suns	
10	Damien Scott	Willetton Tigers	Sami Whitcomb	Rockingham Flames	
11	Cody Ellis	Stirling Senators	Amber Land	Stirling Senators	
12	Gavin Field	Cockburn Cougars	Ashleigh Grant	Lakeside Lightning	
13	Marcus Goode	Cockburn Cougars	Candace Williams	Cockburn Cougars	
14	Marcus Goode	Cockburn Cougars	Carley Mijović	Kalamunda Eastern Suns	
15	Trevor Setty	Mandurah Magic	Deanna Smith	Perry Lakes Hawks	
16	Lewis Thomas	Perth Redbacks	Klara Wischer	Joondalup Wolves	
17	Daniel Alexander	Lakeside Lightning	Candace Williams	Cockburn Cougars	
18	Cooper Land	Rockingham Flames	N/A		
19	Tre Nichols	South West Slammers	Louella Tomlinson	Willetton Tigers	
20	Tre Nichols	South West Slammers	Sami Whitcomb	Rockingham Flames	

=== Statistics leaders ===
Category	Men's Player	Team	Stat	Women's Player	Team	Stat
Points per game	Tre Nichols	South West Slammers	31.13	Candace Williams	Cockburn Cougars	28.06
Rebounds per game	Marcus Goode	Cockburn Cougars	14.58	Candace Williams	Cockburn Cougars	16.33
Assists per game	Taylor Land	Rockingham Flames	6.48	Kate Malpass	Willetton Tigers	5.52
Steals per game	Kenny Manigault	Goldfields Giants	3.23	Sami Whitcomb	Rockingham Flames	3.2
Blocks per game	Marcus Goode	Cockburn Cougars	2.62	Louella Tomlinson	Willetton Tigers	3.13
Field goal percentage	Kevin Davis	Joondalup Wolves	60.8%	Lara Napier	Willetton Tigers	55.6%
3-pt field goal percentage	Gavin Field	Cockburn Cougars	44.2%	Lyndal Gardner	Stirling Senators	38.3%
Free throw percentage	Kyle Armour	Willetton Tigers	83.6%	Deanna Smith	Perry Lakes Hawks	92.2%

=== Regular season ===
The 2016 Basketball WA Annual Awards Night was held on Saturday 17 September at the State Reception Centre in Kings Park.

- Men's Most Valuable Player: Cooper Land (Rockingham Flames)
- Women's Most Valuable Player: Alison Schwagmeyer (Lakeside Lightning)
- Men's Coach of the Year: Matt Parsons (Cockburn Cougars)
- Women's Coach of the Year: Craig Friday (Joondalup Wolves)
- Men's Most Improved Player: Jayden Coburn (Stirling Senators)
- Women's Most Improved Player: Amy Kidner (Joondalup Wolves)
- Men's All-Star Five:
  - PG: Tre Nichols (South West Slammers)
  - SG: Matthew Adekponya (Geraldton Buccaneers)
  - SF: Gavin Field (Cockburn Cougars)
  - PF: Daniel Alexander (Lakeside Lightning)
  - C: Marcus Goode (Cockburn Cougars)
- Women's All-Star Five:
  - PG: Shani Amos (Joondalup Wolves)
  - SG: Sami Whitcomb (Rockingham Flames)
  - SF: Klara Wischer (Joondalup Wolves)
  - PF: Candace Williams (Cockburn Cougars)
  - C: Louella Tomlinson (Willetton Tigers)
- Men's All-Defensive Five:
  - PG: Kyle Armour (Willetton Tigers)
  - SG: Najee Lane (Cockburn Cougars)
  - SF: Ben Purser (Perry Lakes Hawks)
  - PF: Maurice Barrow (Geraldton Buccaneers)
  - C: Kevin Davis (Joondalup Wolves)
- Women's All-Defensive Five:
  - PG: Shani Amos (Joondalup Wolves)
  - SG: Sami Whitcomb (Rockingham Flames)
  - SF: Ebony Antonio (Willetton Tigers)
  - PF: Ellyce Ironmonger (Joondalup Wolves)
  - C: Louella Tomlinson (Willetton Tigers)

=== Finals ===
- Men's Grand Final MVP: Rhett Della Maddalena (Cockburn Cougars)
- Women's Grand Final MVP: Kate Malpass (Willetton Tigers)
