= All-WNBL Team =

The All-WNBL Team is an annual Women's National Basketball League (WNBL) honour bestowed on the best performing players in the league following every WNBL season. From 1988 to 2018–19, the honour was known as the All-Star Five. As of 2020, it is awarded in two teams to the ten most outstanding players in the league.

== Honourees ==
=== 1988 to 2019 ===
| Season | All-Star Five | | |
| Season | Player | Nationality | Team |
|---|---|---|---|
| 1988 | Donna Brown | Australia | North Adelaide Rockets |
| 1988 | Shelley Gorman | Australia | Nunawading Spectres |
| 1988 | Robyn Maher | Australia | Nunawading Spectres |
| 1988 | Michele Timms | Australia | Nunawading Spectres |
| 1988 | Debbie Slimmon | Australia | Coburg Cougars |
| 1989 | Michele Timms (2) | Australia | Nunawading Spectres |
| 1989 | Shelley Gorman (2) | Australia | Nunawading Spectres |
| 1989 | Karin Maar | Australia | Bulleen Melbourne Boomers |
| 1989 | Debbie Slimmon (2) | Australia | Bulleen Melbourne Boomers |
| 1989 | **Kathy Foster** | Australia | Hobart Islanders |
| 1990 | **Debbie Slimmon** (3) | Australia | Bulleen Melbourne Boomers |
| 1990 | Michele Timms (3) | Australia | Nunawading Spectres |
| 1990 | Kathy Foster (2) | Australia | Hobart Islanders |
| 1990 | Vicki Daldy | Australia | North Adelaide Rockets |
| 1990 | Donna Brown (2) | Australia | North Adelaide Rockets |
| 1991 | **Joanne Metcalfe** | Australia | Melbourne Tigers |
| 1991 | Vicki Daldy (2) | Australia | North Adelaide Rockets |
| 1991 | Michele Timms (4) | Australia | Perth Breakers |
| 1991 | Shelley Gorman (3) | Australia | Melbourne East |
| 1991 | Samantha Thornton | Australia | Melbourne East |
| 1992 | Michele Timms (5) | Australia | Perth Breakers |
| 1992 | Allison Cook | Australia | Melbourne Tigers |
| 1992 | Michelle Griffiths | Australia | Adelaide City Comets |
| 1992 | Rachael Sporn | Australia | West Adelaide Bearcats |
| 1992 | Jodie Murphy | Australia | Canberra Capitals |
| 1993 | Vicki Daldy (3) | Australia | Adelaide Lightning |
| 1993 | Rachael Sporn (2) | Australia | Adelaide Lightning |
| 1993 | **Allison Cook** (2) | Australia | Melbourne Tigers |
| 1993 | Samantha Thornton (2) | Australia | Dandenong Rangers |
| 1993 | Shelley Gorman (4) | Australia | Sydney Flames |
| 1994 | Rachael Sporn (3) | Australia | Adelaide Lightning |
| 1994 | Sandy Brondello | Australia | Brisbane Blazers |
| 1994 | Michele Timms (6) | Australia | Perth Breakers |
| 1994 | Allison Cook (3) | Australia | Melbourne Tigers |
| 1994 | **Shelley Gorman** (5) | Australia | Sydney Flames |
| 1995 | Rachael Sporn (4) | Australia | Adelaide Lightning |
| 1995 | **Sandy Brondello** (2) | Australia | Brisbane Blazers |
| 1995 | Debbie Slimmon (4) | Australia | Bulleen Melbourne Boomers |
| 1995 | Allison Cook (4) | Australia | Melbourne Tigers |
| 1995 | Shelley Gorman (6) | Australia | Sydney Flames |
| 1996 | **Rachael Sporn** (5) | Australia | Adelaide Lightning |
| 1996 | Trisha Fallon | Australia | Sydney Flames |
| 1996 | Gina Stevens | Australia | Perth Breakers |
| 1996 | Michele Timms (7) | Australia | Sydney Flames |
| 1996 | Jenny Whittle | Australia | Brisbane Blazers |
| 1997 | **Rachael Sporn** (6) | Australia | Adelaide Lightning |
| 1997 | Kristi Harrower | Australia | Melbourne Tigers |
| 1997 | Trisha Fallon (2) | Australia | Sydney Flames |
| 1997 | Allison Cook (5) | Australia | Melbourne Tigers |
| 1997 | Jenny Whittle (2) | Australia | Brisbane Blazers |
| 1998 | **Michelle Griffiths** (2) | Australia | Sydney Flames |
| 1998 | Kristi Harrower (2) | Australia | Melbourne Tigers |
| 1998 | Annie La Fleur | Australia | Sydney Flames |
| 1998 | Carla Porter | Australia | Adelaide Lightning |
| 1998 | Allison Cook (6) | Australia | Bulleen Melbourne Boomers |
| 1998–99 | Kristi Harrower (3) | Australia | Melbourne Tigers |
| 1998–99 | Rachael Sporn (7) | Australia | Adelaide Lightning |
| 1998–99 | **Lauren Jackson** | Australia | AIS |
| 1998–99 | Shelley Sandie (7) | Australia | Canberra Capitals |
| 1998–99 | Gina Stevens (2) | Australia | Perth Breakers |
| 1999–00 | **Lauren Jackson** (2) | Australia | Canberra Capitals |
| 1999–00 | **Trisha Fallon** (3) | Australia | Sydney Flames |
| 1999–00 | Kristi Harrower (4) | Australia | Melbourne Tigers |
| 1999–00 | Kristin Folkl | United States | Melbourne Tigers |
| 1999–00 | Jo Hill | Australia | Adelaide Lightning |
| 2000–01 | Jae Kingi | Australia | Adelaide Lightning |
| 2000–01 | Annie Burgess (2) | Australia | Sydney Panthers |
| 2000–01 | Belinda Snell | Australia | Sydney Panthers |
| 2000–01 | **Penny Taylor** | Australia | Dandenong Rangers |
| 2000–01 | Lauren Jackson (3) | Australia | Canberra Capitals |
| 2001–02 | Rachael Sporn (8) | Australia | Adelaide Lightning |
| 2001–02 | Jae Kingi (2) | Australia | Adelaide Lightning |
| 2001–02 | Natalie Hughes | Australia | Sydney Panthers |
| 2001–02 | **Penny Taylor** (2) | Australia | Dandenong Rangers |
| 2001–02 | Lauren Jackson (4) | Australia | Canberra Capitals |
| 2002–03 | Kristen Veal | Australia | Canberra Capitals |
| 2002–03 | Carly Wilson | Australia | Dandenong Rangers |
| 2002–03 | Shelley Hammonds | Australia | Sydney Panthers |
| 2002–03 | Natalie Porter | Australia | Townsville Fire |
| 2002–03 | **Lauren Jackson** (5) | Australia | Canberra Capitals |
| 2003–04 | Jodie Datson | Australia | Townsville Fire |
| 2003–04 | Jacinta Hamilton | Australia | Dandenong Rangers |
| 2003–04 | Shelley Hammonds (2) | Australia | Sydney Uni Flames |
| 2003–04 | Belinda Snell (2) | Australia | Sydney Uni Flames |
| 2003–04 | **Lauren Jackson** (6) | Australia | Canberra Capitals |
| 2004–05 | **Katrina Hibbert** | Australia | Bulleen Melbourne Boomers |
| 2004–05 | Jenny Whittle (3) | Australia | Canberra Capitals |
| 2004–05 | Belinda Snell (3) | Australia | Sydney Uni Flames |
| 2004–05 | Trisha Fallon (4) | Australia | Sydney Uni Flames |
| 2004–05 | Erin Phillips | Australia | Adelaide Lightning |
| 2005–06 | Deanna Smith | Australia | Perth Lynx |
| 2005–06 | Jacinta Hamilton (2) | Australia | Dandenong Rangers |
| 2005–06 | Jenny Whittle (4) | Australia | Canberra Capitals |
| 2005–06 | Erin Phillips (2) | Australia | Adelaide Fellas |
| 2005–06 | **Katrina Hibbert** (2) | Australia | Bulleen Melbourne Boomers |
| 2006–07 | Natalie Porter (2) | Australia | Sydney Uni Flames |
| 2006–07 | **Hollie Grima** | Australia | Bulleen Melbourne Boomers |
| 2006–07 | Erin Phillips (3) | Australia | Adelaide Lightning |
| 2006–07 | Carly Wilson (2) | Australia | Perth Lynx |
| 2006–07 | Sharin Milner | Australia | Bulleen Melbourne Boomers |
| 2007–08 | **Natalie Porter** (3) | Australia | Sydney Uni Flames |
| 2007–08 | Tracy Gahan | United States | Adelaide Lightning |
| 2007–08 | Rohanee Cox | Australia | Townsville Fire |
| 2007–08 | Kathleen MacLeod | Australia | Bendigo Spirit |
| 2007–08 | Jessica Foley | Australia | Adelaide Lightning |
| 2008–09 | Kristi Harrower (5) | Australia | Bendigo Spirit |
| 2008–09 | Deanna Smith (2) | Australia | Perth Lynx |
| 2008–09 | **Rohanee Cox** (2) | Australia | Townsville Fire |
| 2008–09 | Abby Bishop | Australia | Canberra Capitals |
| 2008–09 | Jennifer Crouse | United States | Townsville Fire |
| 2009–10 | **Kristi Harrower** (6) | Australia | Bendigo Spirit |
| 2009–10 | Jenna O'Hea | Australia | Bulleen Boomers |
| 2009–10 | Deanna Smith (3) | Australia | Sydney Uni Flames |
| 2009–10 | Liz Cambage | Australia | Bulleen Boomers |
| 2009–10 | Suzy Batkovic | Australia | Sydney Uni Flames |
| 2010–11 | **Liz Cambage** (2) | Australia | Bulleen Boomers |
| 2010–11 | Marianna Tolo | Australia | Canberra Capitals |
| 2010–11 | Amy Denson | United States | Sydney Uni Flames |
| 2010–11 | Kathleen MacLeod (2) | Australia | Dandenong Rangers |
| 2010–11 | Jenna O'Hea (2) | Australia | Bulleen Boomers |
| 2011–12 | **Suzy Batkovic** (2) | Australia | Adelaide Lightning |
| 2011–12 | Belinda Snell (4) | Australia | Sydney Uni Flames |
| 2011–12 | Shanavia Dowdell | United States | Townsville Fire |
| 2011–12 | Jenna O'Hea (3) | Australia | Dandenong Rangers |
| 2011–12 | Kathleen MacLeod (3) | Australia | Dandenong Rangers |
| 2011–12 | Samantha Richards | Australia | Bulleen Boomers |
| 2012–13 | **Suzy Batkovic** (3) | Australia | Adelaide Lightning |
| 2012–13 | Jenna O'Hea (4) | Australia | Dandenong Rangers |
| 2012–13 | Kristi Harrower (7) | Australia | Bendigo Spirit |
| 2012–13 | Kathleen MacLeod (4) | Australia | Dandenong Rangers |
| 2012–13 | Gabrielle Richards | Australia | Bendigo Spirit |
| 2013–14 | Leilani Mitchell | Australia | Dandenong Rangers |
| 2013–14 | Jenna O'Hea (5) | Australia | Dandenong Rangers |
| 2013–14 | Laura Hodges | Australia | Adelaide Lightning |
| 2013–14 | **Suzy Batkovic** (4) | Australia | Townsville Fire |
| 2013–14 | Gabrielle Richards (2) | Australia | Bendigo Spirit |
| 2014–15 | Tess Madgen | Australia | Melbourne Boomers |
| 2014–15 | Kelsey Griffin | United States | Bendigo Spirit |
| 2014–15 | Penny Taylor (3) | Australia | Dandenong Rangers |
| 2014–15 | **Abby Bishop** (2) | Australia | Canberra Capitals |
| 2014–15 | Cayla Francis | Australia | Townsville Fire |
| 2015–16 | Leilani Mitchell (2) | Australia | Adelaide Lightning |
| 2015–16 | Sami Whitcomb | United States | Perth Lynx |
| 2015–16 | Katie Ebzery | Australia | Sydney Uni Flames |
| 2015–16 | Kelsey Griffin (2) | Australia | Bendigo Spirit |
| 2015–16 | **Suzy Batkovic** (5) | Australia | Townsville Fire |
| 2016–17 | Leilani Mitchell (3) | Australia | Sydney Uni Flames |
| 2016–17 | Sami Whitcomb (2) | United States | Perth Lynx |
| 2016–17 | Asia Taylor | United States | Sydney Uni Flames |
| 2016–17 | **Suzy Batkovic** (6) | Australia | Townsville Fire |
| 2016–17 | Marianna Tolo (2) | Australia | Canberra Capitals |
| 2017–18 | Courtney Williams | United States | Perth Lynx |
| 2017–18 | Sami Whitcomb (3) | United States | Perth Lynx |
| 2017–18 | Asia Taylor (2) | United States | Sydney Uni Flames |
| 2017–18 | **Suzy Batkovic** (7) | Australia | Townsville Fire |
| 2017–18 | Liz Cambage (3) | Australia | Melbourne Boomers |
| 2018–19 | Lindsay Allen | United States | Melbourne Boomers |
| 2018–19 | Rebecca Cole | Australia | Dandenong Rangers |
| 2018–19 | Asia Taylor (3) | United States | Perth Lynx |
| 2018–19 | Nia Coffey | United States | Adelaide Lightning |
| 2018–19 | **Kelsey Griffin** (3) | Australia | Canberra Capitals |

=== 2019 to present ===
| Season | First Team | | | Second Team | | |
| Season | Player | Nationality | Team | Player | Nationality | Team |
|---|---|---|---|---|---|---|
| 2019–20 | Leilani Mitchell (4) | Australia | Southside Flyers | Rebecca Cole (2) | Australia | Southside Flyers |
| 2019–20 | Katie Ebzery (2) | Australia | Perth Lynx | Stephanie Talbot | Australia | Adelaide Lightning |
| 2019–20 | **Kia Nurse** | Canada | Canberra Capitals | Alice Kunek | Australia | Sydney Uni Flames |
| 2019–20 | Jenna O'Hea (6) | Australia | Southside Flyers | Cayla George (2) | Australia | Melbourne Boomers |
| 2019–20 | Brianna Turner | United States | Adelaide Lightning | Mercedes Russell | United States | Southside Flyers |
| 2020 | Katie Ebzery (3) | Australia | Perth Lynx | Shyla Heal | Australia | Townsville Fire |
| 2020 | Lauren Nicholson | Australia | Townsville Fire | Maddison Rocci | Australia | Canberra Capitals |
| 2020 | **Stephanie Talbot** (2) | Australia | Adelaide Lightning | Tess Madgen (2) | Australia | Melbourne Boomers |
| 2020 | Cayla George (3) | Australia | Melbourne Boomers | Sara Blicavs | Australia | Southside Flyers |
| 2020 | Liz Cambage (4) | Australia | Southside Flyers | Ezi Magbegor | Australia | Melbourne Boomers |
| 2021–22 | Jackie Young | United States | Perth Lynx | Lindsay Allen (2) | United States | Melbourne Boomers |
| 2021–22 | Brittney Sykes | United States | Canberra Capitals | Marina Mabrey | United States | Perth Lynx |
| 2021–22 | Stephanie Talbot (3) | Australia | Adelaide Lightning | Kelsey Griffin (4) | Australia | Canberra Capitals |
| 2021–22 | **Anneli Maley** | Australia | Bendigo Spirit | Alanna Smith | Australia | Adelaide Lightning |
| 2021–22 | Ezi Magbegor (2) | Australia | Melbourne Boomers | Cayla George (4) | Australia | Melbourne Boomers |
| 2022–23 | Kristy Wallace | Australia | Melbourne Boomers | Jade Melbourne | Australia | Canberra Capitals |
| 2022–23 | Sami Whitcomb (4) | Australia | Perth Lynx | Tiffany Mitchell | United States | Melbourne Boomers |
| 2022–23 | Kayla Thornton | United States | Southside Flyers | Lauren Nicholson (2) | Australia | Townsville Fire |
| 2022–23 | Tianna Hawkins | United States | Townsville Fire | Stephanie Talbot (4) | Australia | Adelaide Lightning |
| 2022–23 | **Cayla George** (5) | Australia | Melbourne Boomers | Lauren Scherf | Australia | Perth Lynx |
| 2023–24 | **Jordin Canada** | United States | Melbourne Boomers | Aari McDonald | United States | Perth Lynx |
| 2023–24 | Jade Melbourne (2) | Australia | Canberra Capitals | Sami Whitcomb (5) | Australia | Townsville Fire |
| 2023–24 | Lauren Nicholson (3) | Australia | Sydney Flames | Amy Atwell | Australia | Perth Lynx |
| 2023–24 | Isobel Borlase | Australia | Adelaide Lightning | DiDi Richards | United States | Sydney Flames |
| 2023–24 | Mercedes Russell (2) | United States | Southside Flyers | Naz Hillmon | United States | Melbourne Boomers |
| 2024–25 | Alex Wilson | Australia | Perth Lynx | Jade Melbourne (3) | Australia | Canberra Capitals |
| 2024–25 | **Sami Whitcomb** (6) | Australia | Bendigo Spirit | Veronica Burton | United States | Bendigo Spirit |
| 2024–25 | Courtney Woods | Australia | Townsville Fire | Miela Sowah | Australia | Perth Lynx |
| 2024–25 | Naz Hillmon (2) | United States | Southside Flyers | Anneli Maley (2) | Australia | Perth Lynx |
| 2024–25 | Laeticia Amihere | Canada | Perth Lynx | Kelsey Griffin (5) | Australia | Bendigo Spirit |
| 2025–26 | Alex Wilson (2) | Australia | Perth Lynx | Alex Ciabattoni | Australia | Perth Lynx |
| 2025–26 | Courtney Woods (2) | Australia | Townsville Fire | Miela Sowah (2) | Australia | Townsville Fire |
| 2025–26 | **Isobel Borlase** (2) | Australia | Bendigo Spirit | Kelsey Griffin (6) | Australia | Bendigo Spirit |
| 2025–26 | Mackenzie Holmes | United States | Geelong Venom | Cayla George (6) | Australia | Southside Melbourne Flyers |
| 2025–26 | Anneli Maley (3) | Australia | Perth Lynx | Han Xu | China | Perth Lynx |

The MVP of each season is highlighted in bold text.

== Most selections ==
| Denotes player inducted into the Australian Basketball Hall of Fame |
| Denotes player who is still active |

| Player | Total | 1st Team | 2nd Team | MVP | Seasons |
|---|---|---|---|---|---|
| Rachael Sporn | 8 | 8 | – | 2 | 17 |
| Michele Timms | 7 | 7 | – | 0 | 17 |
| Shelley Sandie | 7 | 7 | – | 1 | – |
| Kristi Harrower | 7 | 7 | – | 1 | 18 |
| Suzy Batkovic | 7 | 7 | – | 6 | 17 |
| Allison Tranquilli | 6 | 6 | – | 1 | – |
| Lauren Jackson | 6 | 6 | 0 | 4 | 14 |
| Jenna O'Hea | 6 | 6 | 0 | 0 | 15 |
| Cayla George | 5 | 3 | 2 | 1 | 15 |
| Debbie Slimmon | 4 | 4 | – | 2 | – |
| Trisha Fallon | 4 | 4 | – | 1 | – |
| Jenny Whittle | 4 | 4 | – | 0 | – |
| Belinda Snell | 4 | 4 | – | 0 | 15 |
| Kathleen MacLeod | 4 | 4 | – | 0 | 9 |
| Leilani Mitchell | 4 | 4 | 0 | 0 | 9 |
| Liz Cambage | 4 | 4 | 0 | 1 | 7 |
| Sami Whitcomb | 4 | 4 | 0 | 0 | 5 |
| Kelsey Griffin | 4 | 3 | 1 | 1 | 11 |
| Stephanie Talbot | 4 | 2 | 2 | 1 | 10 |
| Vicki Daldy | 3 | 3 | – | 0 | – |
| Erin Phillips | 3 | 3 | – | 0 | 6 |
| Natalie Porter | 3 | 3 | – | 1 | 15 |
| Deanna Smith | 3 | 3 | – | 0 | 15 |
| Penny Taylor | 3 | 3 | – | 2 | 7 |
| Asia Taylor | 3 | 3 | – | 0 | 3 |
| Katie Ebzery | 3 | 3 | 0 | 0 | 14 |

The table above only lists players with at least three total selections.

== See also ==
- WNBL Most Valuable Player Award
- WNBL Defensive Player of the Year Award
- All-NBL Team
- All-WNBA Team
- List of Australian WNBA players
- Australia women's national basketball team
