= Samantha Richards =

Australian basketball player

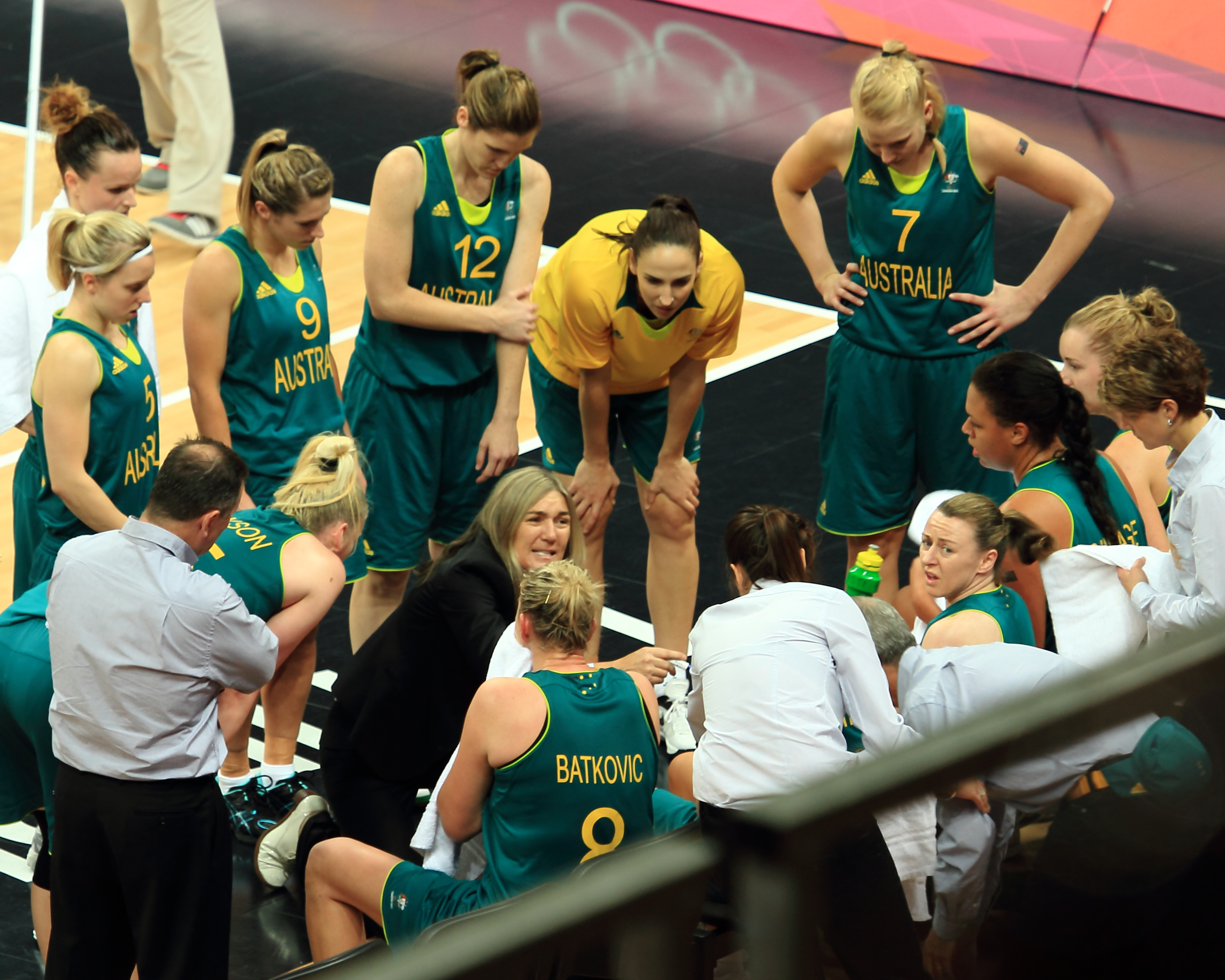
- Richards (wearing #5) at the London 2012 Summer Olympics

Personal information
- Born: 24 February 1983 (age 43)
- Listed height: 170 cm (5 ft 7 in)
- Listed weight: 64 kg (141 lb)
- Position: Guard

Career highlights
- WNBL All-Star Five (2011/12)

Samantha Richards (born 24 February 1983) is an Australian basketball guard from Melbourne, Victoria who played her junior basketball in Nunawading. She has played professionally in Australia for the WNBL's Dandenong Rangers, the Australian Institute of Sport, the Perth Lynx and the Bulleen Boomers. She has also played professionally in Europe. Richards has been a member of the Australia women's national basketball team on the U19, U21, University and Senior teams.

== Personal ==
Richards was born on 24 February 1983 in Melbourne.

== Basketball ==
Richards is a guard, specialising as a point guard. She played her junior basketball for Nunawading.

=== Europe ===
Richards has played basketball in Europe. In 2007, she signed to play with AZS PWSZ Gorzow in Poland. In 2009, she was playing for a Czech team.

=== WNBL ===
Richards played for the Dandenong Rangers in 1998, and 1998/1999 WNBL seasons. In 1999, she earned a scholarship with the Australian Institute of Sport (AIS) and played with the WNBL AIS team in 1999/2000. She rejoined Dandenong for the 2001/2002 season and continued to play for them during the 2002/2003 and 2003/2004 seasons, and was a key player in their Grand Final victory in 2003/2004. Her 2004 Dandenong team competed in the FIBA World League. She played for the Dandenong Rangers in 2004/2005. That season, her team won the league championship, Richards being a key part. She continued to play for the team in 2005/2006 and 2006/2007, missing the first third of the 2006/2007 season because she was injured. That season, she was the team's co-captain alongside Caitlin Ryan. This season, she was 25 years old. In the team's 66–61 loss to the Adelaide Lightning, she scored only five points, while attempting only a pair of three-point shots that she lost. In 2008, she was named as one of the players on the Dandenong Rangers Team of the Decade.

Richards joined the Perth Lynx in 2007/2008. In a December 2007 game against her former team the Rangers, she scored 23 total points, 14 of them in the first half. She played for the Perth Lynx in 2008/2009. In a December 2008 game against the Christchurch Sirens, she scored 12 points in 66–61 win for the Sirens. She missed a pair of three-point shots in the clutch that would have tied the game for her team. Following the loss, her team remained in tenth and last position on the WNBL's ladder.

Richards played for the Bulleen Boomers in 2011/2012. That season, she was named to the WNBL's All-Star Five.

=== National team ===
Richards has represented Australia on U19, U21 and University level, and made her international debut in 2001, in the U19 World Championships for Australia. She has 20 caps for Australia's junior national team and 18 caps for the Australian Young national team. She was part of the Australian side at the 2003 FIBA U21 Women's Championships in Croatia and the 2007 Australian World University gold medal-winning team.

Richards was a member of the Australian Opals in 2005 and 2007. In 2007, she was a member of the Australia women's senior team that won a gold medal at the Oceania World Qualifications series. and by March 2007, she was named to the national team what would prepare for the 2008 Summer Olympics.

Richards was with the Opals in 2008 and participated in a week-long training camp with the national team in Canberra in late March, early April. She played in a three-game test series Taiwan in May 2008.

Richards continued to play for the Opals in 2009, playing in a Canberra-hosted return game against New Zealand in the Oceania Championship on 2 September, having gotten permission from her Czech club to participate. Her team ended up winning a gold medal at the FIBA Oceania Women's Championships. In mid-2010, she participated in a tour of China, USA and Hungary. In 2010, she participated in the Salamanca Invitational Basketball Tournament in Spain. Her team beat Spain 85–64. They also beat the United States. As the team's guard, she helped prevent turnovers in the game against Spain. In 2010, she was a member of the senior women's national team that competed at the World Championships in the Czech Republic.

Richards was a member of the 2011 Opals squad. In July 2011, she participated in the Olympic qualification competition, returning to the team following an injury. She was named to the 2012 Australia women's national basketball team. She was scheduled to participate in the national team training camp held from 14 to 18 May 2012 at the Australian Institute of Sport. At the 2012 Summer Olympics, she was part of the Australian team that won the bronze medal.
