= Shelley Hammonds =

Australian basketball player

Australian Institute of Sport Sydney Uni Flames Perth Lynx Dandenong Rangers Melbourne Boomers Adelaide Lightning
- Position: Centre
- League: WNBL

Personal information
- Born: 6 March 1983 (age 43) Wollongong, New South Wales
- Listed height: 6 ft 2 in (1.88 m)

Shelley Jane Hammonds (born 6 March 1983) is a retired Australian women's basketball player, who represented the country at both junior and senior levels. Hammonds is married to basketball player Matt Burston.

== Biography ==
Hammonds commenced playing in the Women's National Basketball League (WNBL) in 1999. Since then, Hammonds has played for the AIS (1999 to 2002), Sydney Uni Flames (2002/03 to 2003/04); Perth Lynx (2004/05); Dandenong Rangers (2005/06 to 2007/08), Melbourne Boomers (2008/09 and 2010/11) and Adelaide Lightning (2009/10). Hammonds retired following the completion of the 2010/11 season having played 210 games.

In season 1999/00, Hammonds won the WNBL Rookie of the Year Award for the most outstanding first year player. Hammonds was also selected to the WNBL All-Star Five on two occasions; 2002/03 and 2003/04.

At official FIBA tournaments, Hammonds represented Australia at the 2001 World Championship for Junior Women and 2003 World Championship for Young Women. At the 2001 Championship, Hammonds led the points scored for Australia with an average of 17.9 points per game.

== See also ==
- WNBL Rookie of the Year Award
- WNBL All-Star Five
