= Cheryl Chambers =

Australian basketball player (born 1968)

Sandringham Sabres
- Title: Head coach
- League: NBL1 South

Personal information
- Born: 18 April 1968 (age 58)

Career information
- Playing career: 1984–1997
- Position: Guard
- Coaching career: 2001–present

Career history

Playing
- 1984–1985: Melbourne East
- 1986–1988: Coburg Cougars
- 1989–1995: Bulleen Boomers
- 1996–1997: Melbourne Tigers

Coaching
- 2001–2009: Bulleen Boomers
- 2005–2007: Australian Opals (assistant)
- 2010–2013: Australian Gems
- 2013–2016: Melbourne Boomers (assistant)
- 2016–2019: Sydney Uni Flames
- 2017–present: Australian Opals (assistant)
- 2019–2024: Southside Flyers
- 2026–: Sandringham Sabres

Career highlights
- As player: WNBL champion (1984); As coach: 3× WNBL champion (2017, 2020, 2024); 3× WNBL Coach of the Year (2005, 2009, 2017)

Cheryl Chambers (born 18 April 1968) is an Australian basketball coach and former player. She currently serves as head coach of the Sandringham Sabres women's team in the NBL1 South.

== Career ==
=== WNBL ===
Chambers played 261 games in the Women's National Basketball League (playing for the Melbourne East, Coburg, Bulleen Boomers and Melbourne Tigers) and is a Life Member of the WNBL. After her playing career, Chambers went on to coach the Bulleen Boomers from 2001 through to 2009. In her time there, she won the WNBL Coach of the Year Award twice in 2004–05 and 2008–09 respectively.

Following on from stints with Australia's U-19 national team, Knox Raiders in the SEABL and an assistant coach position back with the Melbourne Boomers under Guy Molloy, Chambers returned to the league after an eight-year hiatus from a head coaching role. During her time in Sydney, Chambers would win a WNBL Championship and again take home the WNBL Coach of the Year.

In 2019, Chambers signed as head coach to the newly rebranded Southside Flyers back in her home city of Melbourne.

In September 2025, Chambers was appointed head coach of the Sandringham Sabres women's team in the NBL1 South for the 2026 season. In September 2026, she re-signed as Sabres head coach for the 2027 NBL1 season.

== Coaching record ==
Legend
Regular season	G	Games coached	W	Games won	L	Games lost	W–L %	Win–loss %
Playoffs	PG	Playoff games	PW	Playoff wins	PL	Playoff losses	PW–L %	Playoff win–loss %

=== WNBL ===
Team	Year	G	W	L	W–L%	Finish	PG	PW	PL	PW–L%	Result
Bulleen	2001–02	17	4	13	.235	6th of 8	–	–	–	–	
Bulleen	2002–03	21	6	15	.286	6th of 8	–	–	–	–	
Bulleen	2003–04	21	11	10	.524	6th of 8	–	–	–	–	
Bulleen	2004–05	21	16	5	.762	2nd of 8	2	0	2	.000	Lost Preliminary final
Bulleen	2005–06	21	13	8	.619	4th of 8	1	0	1	.000	Lost Semi-final
Bulleen	2006–07	21	12	9	.571	5th of 8	–	–	–	–	
Bulleen	2007–08	24	11	13	.458	5th of 10	–	–	–	–	
Bulleen	2008–09	22	17	5	.773	2nd of 10	3	1	2	.333	Lost Grand Final
Sydney	2016–17	24	18	6	.750	1st of 8	4	4	0	1.000	Won Grand Final
Sydney	2017–18	21	14	7	.667	2nd of 8	2	0	2	.000	Lost Semi-final
Sydney	2018–19	21	2	19	.095	8th of 8	–	–	–	–	
Southside	2019–20	21	17	4	.810	1st of 8	4	2	2	.500	Lost Grand Final
Southside	2020	13	11	2	.846	1st of 8	3	3	0	1.000	Won Grand Final
Career		268	152	116	.567		19	10	9	.526	
