= 2004–05 WNBL season =

- League: Women's National Basketball League
- Sport: Basketball
- Duration: October 2004 – February 2005
- Teams: 8
- TV partner: ABC

Regular season
- Top seed: Dandenong Rangers
- Season MVP: Katrina Hibbert (Bulleen Boomers)
- Top scorer: Belinda Snell (Sydney Uni Flames)

Finals
- Champions: Dandenong Rangers
- Runners-up: Sydney Uni Flames
- Finals MVP: Jacinta Hamilton (Rangers)

WNBL seasons
- ← 2003–04 2005–06 →

The 2004–05 WNBL season was the 25th season of competition since its establishment in 1981. A total of 8 teams contested the league.

Broadcast rights were held by the free-to-air network ABC. ABC broadcast one game a week, at 1:00 p.m. at all standard time in Australia.

Molten provided equipment including the official game ball, with the Hoop2Hoop supplying team apparel.

== Team standings ==
| # | WNBL Championship Ladder | | | | |
| # | Team | W | L | PCT | GP |
|---|---|---|---|---|---|
| 1 | Dandenong Rangers | 19 | 2 | 90.0 | 21 |
| 2 | Bulleen Boomers | 16 | 5 | 76.0 | 21 |
| 3 | Sydney Uni Flames | 16 | 5 | 76.0 | 21 |
| 4 | Adelaide Lightning | 13 | 8 | 62.0 | 21 |
| 5 | Canberra Capitals | 9 | 12 | 43.0 | 21 |
| 6 | Townsville Fire | 7 | 14 | 33.0 | 21 |
| 7 | AIS | 3 | 18 | 14.0 | 21 |
| 8 | Perth Lynx | 1 | 20 | 5.00 | 21 |

== Finals ==
Semifinals
Dandenong Rangers | 63
Bulleen Boomers | 59
Sydney Uni Flames | 94
Adelaide Lightning | 93

Preliminary final
Bulleen Boomers | 71
Sydney Uni Flames | 79

Grand final
Dandenong Rangers | 52
Sydney Uni Flames | 47

== Season award winners ==
| Award | Winner | Team |
|---|---|---|
| Most Valuable Player Award | Katrina Hibbert | Bulleen Boomers |
| Grand Final MVP Award | Jacinta Hamilton | Dandenong Rangers |
| Rookie of the Year Award | Renae Camino | AIS |
| Defensive Player of the Year Award | Emily McInerny | Dandenong Rangers |
| Coach of the Year Award | Cheryl Chambers | Bulleen Boomers |
| Top Shooter Award | Belinda Snell | Sydney Uni Flames |
| All-Star Five | Katrina Hibbert; Jenny Whittle (3) ; Belinda Snell (3) ; Trisha Fallon (4) ; Erin Phillips | |

== Statistics leaders ==
| Category | Player | Team | GP | Totals | Average |
|---|---|---|---|---|---|
| Points Per Game | Belinda Snell | Sydney Uni Flames | 21 | 427 | 20.3 |
| Rebounds Per Game | Donna Loffhagen | Canberra Capitals | 12 | 120 | 10.0 |
| Assists Per Game | Jennifer Screen | Adelaide Lightning | 21 | 123 | 5.9 |
| Steals Per Game | Tully Bevilaqua | Canberra Capitals | 15 | 40 | 2.7 |
| Blocks per game | Jenny Whittle | Canberra Capitals | 21 | 48 | 2.3 |
| Field Goal % | Laura Summerton | Adelaide Lightning | 21 | (171/318) | 53.8% |
| Three-Point Field Goal % | Tully Bevilaqua | Canberra Capitals | 15 | (36/80) | 45.0% |
| Free Throw % | Katrina Hibbert | Bulleen Boomers | 21 | (60/66) | 90.9% |
