= Joanne Metcalfe =

Australian basketball player

Personal information
- Born: 13 April 1969 (age 57) Adelaide, South Australia
Medal record
Women's Basketball
Representing Australia
Junior World Championships
Bronze medal – third place	1989 Spain	Team competition

Joanne (Jo) Metcalfe (née Moyle) (born 13 April 1969) is a former Australian women's basketball player.

== Biography ==
Joanne (Jo) played for the Australia women's national basketball team during the late 1980s and early 1990s and competed for Australia at the 1990 World Championship held in Brazil. Jo was selected to play for Australia at the 1992 Olympics held in Barcelona, but the Opals failed to qualify for the tournament. She won a bronze medal for Australia at the 1989 Junior World Championships in Spain where she played alongside future great, Shelley Gorman. That squad was the first Australian basketball team – junior or senior – to win a medal at world championships or Olympic games, though she just missed them.

In the domestic Women's National Basketball League (WNBL), Jo played 272 games for the Australian Institute of Sport (1985 to 1987), West Adelaide (1988 & 1989), Melbourne Tigers (1990–1995 & 1998–00) and the Bulleen Boomers (1996 to 1998). In season 1991, Jo won the WNBL Most Valuable Player award and was also named to the WNBL All Star Five. That year, she also led the WNBL in points scored with 479 at an average of 21.8 per game. In 1999, Jo had a major knee reconstruction, which effectively ended her playing career.

In 1998/99, Jo was awarded Life Membership of the WNBL. During the 25th year celebration of the WNBL, she was named in the top 25 Australian players for that time. Jo is close friends with Opals player Kristi Harrower and in 2006 her daughter's formed part of Harrower's bridal party. Jo lives in Warrandyte with her husband and two daughters, where she is the coach of the local domestic basketball team (Warrandyte Redbacks).

== See also ==
- WNBL Top Shooter Award
- WNBL All-Star Five
