= 2003–04 WNBL season =

- League: Women's National Basketball League
- Sport: Basketball
- Duration: October 2003 – February 2004
- Number of teams: 8
- TV partner(s): ABC

Regular season
- Top seed: Dandenong Rangers
- Season MVP: Lauren Jackson (Canberra Capitals)
- Top scorer: Lauren Jackson (Canberra Capitals)

Finals
- Champions: Dandenong Rangers
- Runners-up: Sydney Uni Flames
- Finals MVP: Emily McInerny (Rangers)

WNBL seasons
- ← 2002–03 2004–05 →

The 2003–04 WNBL season was the 24th season of competition since its establishment in 1981. A total of 8 teams contested the league.

Broadcast rights were held by free-to-air network ABC. ABC broadcast one game a week, at 1:00PM at every standard time in Australia.

Molten provided equipment including the official game ball, with Hoop2Hoop supplying team apparel.

== Team standings ==
#	WNBL Championship Ladder				
#	Team	W	L	PCT	GP
1	Dandenong Rangers	17	4	80.0	21
2	Sydney Uni Flames	13	8	62.0	21
3	Adelaide Lightning	13	8	62.0	21
4	Canberra Capitals	13	8	62.0	21
5	Townsville Fire	12	9	57.0	21
6	Bulleen Boomers	7	9	52.0	21
7	AIS	5	16	24.0	21
8	Perth Lynx	0	21	0.00	21

== Finals ==
Semifinals
Dandenong Rangers	85
Sydney Uni Flames	68
Adelaide Lightning	72
Canberra Capitals	63

Preliminary final
Sydney Uni Flames	65
Adelaide Lightning	61

Grand final
Dandenong Rangers	63
Sydney Uni Flames	53

== Season award winners ==
Award	Winner	Team
Most Valuable Player Award	Lauren Jackson	Canberra Capitals
Grand Final MVP Award	Emily McInerny	Dandenong Rangers
Rookie of the Year Award	Kathleen MacLeod	AIS
Defensive Player of the Year Award	Emily McInerny	Dandenong Rangers
Coach of the Year Award	Gary Fox	Dandenong Rangers
Top Shooter Award	Lauren Jackson	Canberra Capitals
All-Star Five	Jodie Datson; Jacinta Hamilton; Shelley Hammonds (2) ; Belinda Snell (2) ; Lauren Jackson (6)	

== Statistics leaders ==
Category	Player	Team	GP	Totals	Average
Points Per Game	Lauren Jackson	Canberra Capitals	14	391	27.9
Rebounds Per Game	Lauren Jackson	Canberra Capitals	14	193	13.8
Assists Per Game	Emily McInerny	Dandenong Rangers	21	84	4.0
Steals Per Game	Katrina Hibbert; Emily McInerny; Gina Stevens	Bulleen Boomers; Dandenong Rangers; Townsville Fire	21	42	2.0
Blocks per game	Lauren Jackson	Canberra Capitals	14	34	2.4
Field Goal %	Rachel Warren	AIS	15	(35/64)	54.7%
Three-Point Field Goal %	Shelley Hammonds	Sydney Uni Flames	20	(18/39)	46.2%
Free Throw %	Jessica Bibby	Dandenong Rangers	21	(41/47)	87.2%
