= Samantha Thornton =

Australian basketball player (born 1966)

Personal information
- Born: 20 April 1966 (age 60) Melbourne, Victoria
Medal record
Women's Basketball
Representing Australia

Samantha Thornton (born 20 April 1966) is a former Australian women's basketball player.

== Biography ==
Thornton was a member of the national team roster for several years, from 1989 to 1995 competing at two World Championships; 1990 held in Malaysia and 1994 held in Australia. The Opals not qualifying for the 1992 Olympic Games in Barcelona probably cost Thornton her only chance to compete at an Olympic Games.

In the domestic Women's National Basketball League (WNBL), Thornton played 230 games for Bulleen Boomers (1984–87), Melbourne East (1988–91) and Dandenong Rangers (1992–96). In 1989, Thornton won the Maher Medal for the Australian International Player of the Year. Thornton was also twice named to the WNBL All Star Five, in seasons 1991 and 1993. In 1993, Thornton won the WNBL Top Shooter award with 359 points at an average of 18.9 per game.

== See also ==
- WNBL Top Shooter Award
- WNBL All-Star Five
