= Donna Brown (basketball) =

Australian basketball player

Donna Quinn
Personal information
- Born: 12 October 1963 (age 62) Pittsworth, Queensland

Sport
- Country: Australia
- Sport: Women's Basketball

Donna Quinn (born 12 October 1963) is a former Australian women's basketball player.

5 feet 11 inch (180 cm) Forward

1984 Los Angeles Olympics, 1988 Seoul Olympics

== Biography ==
Donna played for the Australian national team between 1982 and 1989, competing at the 1984 Olympic Games in Los Angeles and the 1988 Olympic Games in Seoul. Brown also represented Australia at one World Championship; 1986 held in the Soviet Union.

In the domestic Women's National Basketball League (WNBL) Brown played 215 games for both the Australian Institute of Sport (44 games) and the North Adelaide Rockets (171 games). Brown was also named to the WNBL All Star Five on two occasions; 1988 and 1990.

Donna Quinn started playing basketball as a ten-year-old on the Pittsworth bitumen courts. During her junior years, she represented Pittsworth, Toowoomba, Queensland South Zone, and Queensland at all junior levels.

In 1981, she won an inaugural scholarship to the new Australian Institute of Sport in Canberra. At the AIS Donna successfully juggled a bank job with the rigours and demands of training every day and set herself a goal of playing at the 1984 Olympics.

Donna was a member of the fledgling AIS team in the WNBL Her play was so impressive that she was selected to tour China in early 1984 and was then selected for the Olympic Qualification Tournament in Cuba.

Donna then went on to represent Australia at the 1985 Australia Games where Australia won Gold, at the 1986 World Championships, the 1988 Olympic Games and tours of Europe, U.S. and Canada.

Donna’s national career was even more impressive, playing a total of 215 WNBL games and is renowned for being one of the more dominant players in the WNBL for those nine years. In 1990 Donna won the WNBL Grand Final with the North Adelaide Rockets and was named the Finals MVP.

Donna retired from elite basketball at the end of the 1990 season.

Donna Quinn was inducted in the 2021 Queensland Basketball Hall of Fame, which praised her drive, work ethic and competitive spirit.

== Donna Quinn Basketball Accomplishments ==
=== QLD JUNIORS ===
1976 Under 14 Qld Women's Honorary Team

1977 Australian Championships Under 16

1978 Australian Championships Under 16 – Runner Ups - Captain

1979 Australian Championships Under 18

1980 Australian Championships Under 18 - Winners - Captain

1981 Australian Championships Under 20

Australian Institute of Sport Selected – Foundation Year

Oceania Championships – Winner

1982 Australian Championships Under 20

Australian Institute of Sport

1983 Australian Championships Opens

Australian Institute of Sport

=== WNBL ===
1981–1983 Australian Institute of Sport - 44 games

1984–1987 Noarlunga - 76 games

1984 Australian Club Championship Winners

1984–1986 State League Winners

1985 WNBL Runners-up

1986 Australian Club Championships - Named MVP

1986 State League Winners

1987 SA All Star 5, Halls Medalist runners-up, Defensive Player

1988–1991 North Adelaide - 75 games

1988 WNBL All Star 5

1988 Sport Australia Award - Team of The Year

1989 Sport Australia Award - Team of the Year

1990 WNBL Champions - Named MVP FINAL

1990 WNBL All Star 5

1990 Hall Medalist

1990 State all Star 5

1990 Best Defensive Player

1990 Won Both State Leagues, Australian Club Championships, WNBL All Star 5, MVP, Halls Medalist, State All Star 5, Defensive Player

1992 Adelaide Lightning - 20 games

== See also ==
- WNBL All-Star Five
