= Jodie Datson =

Australian basketball player

No. 4 – Opals
- Position: Point guard
- League: WNBL

Personal information
- Born: 14 August 1977 (age 49)
- Listed height: 5 ft 6 in (1.68 m)

Career highlights
- WNBL All-Star Five (2003-04); Townsville Fire MVP (2004)

Jodie Victoria Datson (born 14 August 1977) is a retired Australian women's basketball player.

== Biography ==
Datson played for the Australia women's national basketball team between 2003-2005 and was also a member of the 2004 Olympic squad for Athens. She was not selected in the final team.

Datson's best season in the Women's National Basketball League (WNBL) was 2003–04 with the Townsville Fire, where she was awarded their most valuable player and named in the national All-Star Five. To help celebrate the Fire's 15th anniversary in the WNBL in 2015, Datson was named in their commemorative All-Star team.
