= Desiree Glaubitz =

Australian basketball player

Desiree Glaubitz (born 24 September 1979 in Traralgon) is an Australian basketball player, captain of the Bulleen Boomers in the Women's National Basketball League.

Glaubitz is 177 centimetres tall and plays guard. In the WNBL, she has played with AIS 1997–99; Sydney 1999/00; Townsville 2001/02; Bulleen Boomers from 2003/04.
