= 2005–06 WNBL season =

- League: Women's National Basketball League
- Sport: Basketball
- Duration: October 2005 – February 2006
- Number of teams: 8
- TV partner(s): ABC

Regular season
- Top seed: Dandenong Rangers
- Season MVP: Katrina Hibbert (Bulleen Boomers)
- Top scorer: Deanna Smith (Perth Lynx)

Finals
- Champions: Canberra Capitals
- Runners-up: Dandenong Rangers
- Finals MVP: Lauren Jackson (Canberra Capitals)

WNBL seasons
- ← 2004–05 2006–07 →

The 2005–06 WNBL season was the 26th season of competition since its establishment in 1981. A total of 8 teams contested the league.

Broadcast rights were held by free-to-air network ABC. ABC broadcast one game a week, at 1:00 PM at every standard time in Australia.

Molten provided equipment including the official game ball, with Hoop2Hoop supplying team apparel.

== Team standings ==
#	WNBL Championship Ladder				
#	Team	W	L	PCT	GP
1	Dandenong Rangers	14	7	67.0	21
2	Adelaide Fellas	14	7	67.0	21
3	Canberra Capitals	14	7	67.0	21
4	Bulleen Boomers	13	8	62.0	21
5	Sydney Uni Flames	13	8	62.0	21
6	Townsville Fire	12	9	57.0	21
7	Perth Lynx	4	17	19.0	21
8	AIS	0	21	0.00	21

== Finals ==
Semifinals
Dandenong Rangers	75
Adelaide Fellas	70
Canberra Capitals	67
Bulleen Boomers	62

Preliminary final
Adelaide Fellas	81
Canberra Capitals	83

Grand final
Dandenong Rangers	55
Canberra Capitals	68

== Season award winners ==
Award	Winner	Team
Most Valuable Player Award	Katrina Hibbert	Bulleen Boomers
Grand Final MVP Award	Lauren Jackson	Canberra Capitals
Rookie of the Year Award	Abby Bishop	AIS
Defensive Player of the Year Award	Emily McInerny	Dandenong Rangers
Coach of the Year Award	Gary Fox	Dandenong Rangers
Top Shooter Award	Deanna Smith	Perth Lynx

== Statistics leaders ==
Category	Player	Team	GP	Totals	Average
Points Per Game	Deanna Smith	Perth Lynx	21	456	21.7
Rebounds Per Game	Hollie Grima	Bulleen Boomers	21	191	9.1
Assists Per Game	Erin Phillips	Adelaide Fellas	21	102	4.9
Steals Per Game	Tully Bevilaqua	Canberra Capitals	21	48	2.3
Blocks per game	Louella Tomlinson	AIS	19	51	2.7
Field Goal %	Tracey Beatty	Canberra Capitals	21	(70/121)	57.9%
Three-Point Field Goal %	Jennifer Screen	Adelaide Fellas	20	(43/100)	43.0%
Free Throw %	Desiree Glaubitz	Bulleen Boomers	20	(58/67)	86.6%
