= Vicki Daldy =

Australian basketball player

North Adelaide Rockets West Adelaide Bearcats Adelaide Link Dandenong Rangers
- Position: Guard
- League: WNBL

Personal information
- Born: 24 October 1966 (age 60) Adelaide, South Australia, Australia
- Listed height: 5 ft 7 in (1.70 m)

Vicki Daldy (born 24 October 1966) is an Australian former basketball player, who represented the country at both junior and senior levels. Her married name is Vicki Valk.

== Biography ==
Daldy commenced playing in the Women's National Basketball League (WNBL) in 1984. Since then, Daldy played for the North Adelaide Rockets (1984 to 1991), West Adelaide Bearcats (1992); Adelaide Link (1993 to 1994) and Dandenong Rangers (1996), totaling 247 games. Daldy retired following the completion of the 1996 season.

Daldy was also selected to the WNBL All-Star Five on three occasions; 1990, 1991 and 1993. In 1992, Daldy would win the Halls Medal for the best and fairest player in the South Australian Women's competition. Daldy was awarded WNBL Life Membership, as an inaugural member. At official FIBA events, Daldy represented Australia at the 1992 World Olympic Qualifying Tournament for Women.

Following her retirement, Daldy became a coach of the Adelaide Lightning and a player and development officer with Basketball South Australia.

In 2025, Daldy coached the Woodville Warriors women's team to the NBL1 Central championship.

== See also ==
- WNBL All-Star Five
