= Nyaduoth Lok =

South Sudanese-Australian basketball player (born 2000)

Free agent
- Position: Guard

Personal information
- Born: 24 April 2000 (age 26) Ethiopia
- Listed height: 180 cm (5 ft 11 in)

Career information
- College: Midland College (2019–2021); George Washington (2021–2024)
- WNBA draft: 2024: undrafted
- Playing career: 2019–present

Career history
- 2019: Waverley Falcons
- 2024–2025: Townsville Fire
- 2025: Ringwood Hawks
- 2025–2026: Southside Melbourne Flyers
- 2026: Casey Cavaliers

Career highlights
- First-team All-WJCAC (2021)

Nyaduoth Gach Lok (born 24 April 2000) is a South Sudanese-Australian professional basketball player who last played for the Casey Cavaliers of the NBL1 South. She played college basketball for the Midland College Chaps and the George Washington Revolutionaries before debuting in the Women's National Basketball League (WNBL) in 2024 with the Townsville Fire.

== Early life and career ==
Lok was born at a refugee camp in Ethiopia after her South Sudanese parents fled the country due to the Second Sudanese Civil War. She lived there until she was 5 years old, after which the family moved to Australia in 2005 and settled down in Melbourne in the suburb of Cranbourne. She grew up playing soccer and competing in track until discovering basketball as a young teenager.

In 2019, Lok debuted for the Waverley Falcons of the NBL1 in the league's inaugural season. In 17 games, she averaged 4.8 points and 2.2 rebounds per game.

== College career ==
As a freshman for the Midland College Chaps in 2019–20, Lok started 17 of 28 games and averaged 8.0 points, 3.6 rebounds and 1.4 assists in 21.1 minutes per game.

As a sophomore in 2020–21, Lok was named NJCAA Region V Player of the Week three times and was named to the All-WJCAC first team after averaging 14.2 points, 7.2 rebounds and 2.4 assists per game. She started all 17 games and recorded double figures in 13 games.

In May 2021, Lok transferred to the George Washington Revolutionaries. In the 2021–22 season, she appeared in 24 games and made 11 starts while averaging 5.8 points and 2.4 rebonds in 16.7 minutes per game. She scored a career-high 26 points on 10-17 shooting in 38 minutes against Virginia on 5 December 2021.

In 2022–23, Lok played 29 games with eight starts and averaged 8.0 points and 3.5 rebounds per game. She scored a season-high 21 points against Rhode Island on 3 March 2023 in George Washington's A-10 quarterfinal appearance.

In 2023–24, Lok played 29 games with 25 starts and averaged 10.0 points and 4.7 rebounds in 27.4 minutes per game. She registered a season-high 19 points on two occasions and reached the 1,000-point milestone for her career.

== Professional career ==
On 1 August 2024, Lok signed with the Townsville Fire of the Women's National Basketball League (WNBL) for the 2024–25 season. In 18 games, she averaged 2.6 points per game.

In March 2025, Lok signed with the Ringwood Hawks of the NBL1 South for the 2025 NBL1 season. In 21 games, she averaged 13.3 points, 6.8 rebounds and 1.9 assists per game.

Heading into the 2025–26 WNBL season, Lok didn't have a contract, instead she had to fight her way onto the Southside Melbourne Flyers roster as a train-on player in preseason. After earning her way onto the main roster, she became a key defensive player for the Flyers. In 19 games, she averaged 4.8 points, 1.8 rebounds and 1.0 assists per game. For the season, she was named the winner of the WNBL Community Award for her work off the court in the community.

In February 2026, Lok signed with the Casey Cavaliers for the 2026 NBL1 South season.

On 6 May 2026, Lok signed with the Perth Lynx for the 2026–27 WNBL season. On 13 September 2026, Lok and the Lynx agreed to part ways following a change in personal circumstances.

== National team ==
In July 2021, Lok played for the South Sudan women's national basketball team in the FIBA Afrobasket Zone 5 Qualifiers in Rwanda.

== Personal life ==
Lok has four brothers and three sisters.
