= Jo Hill =

Australian basketball player

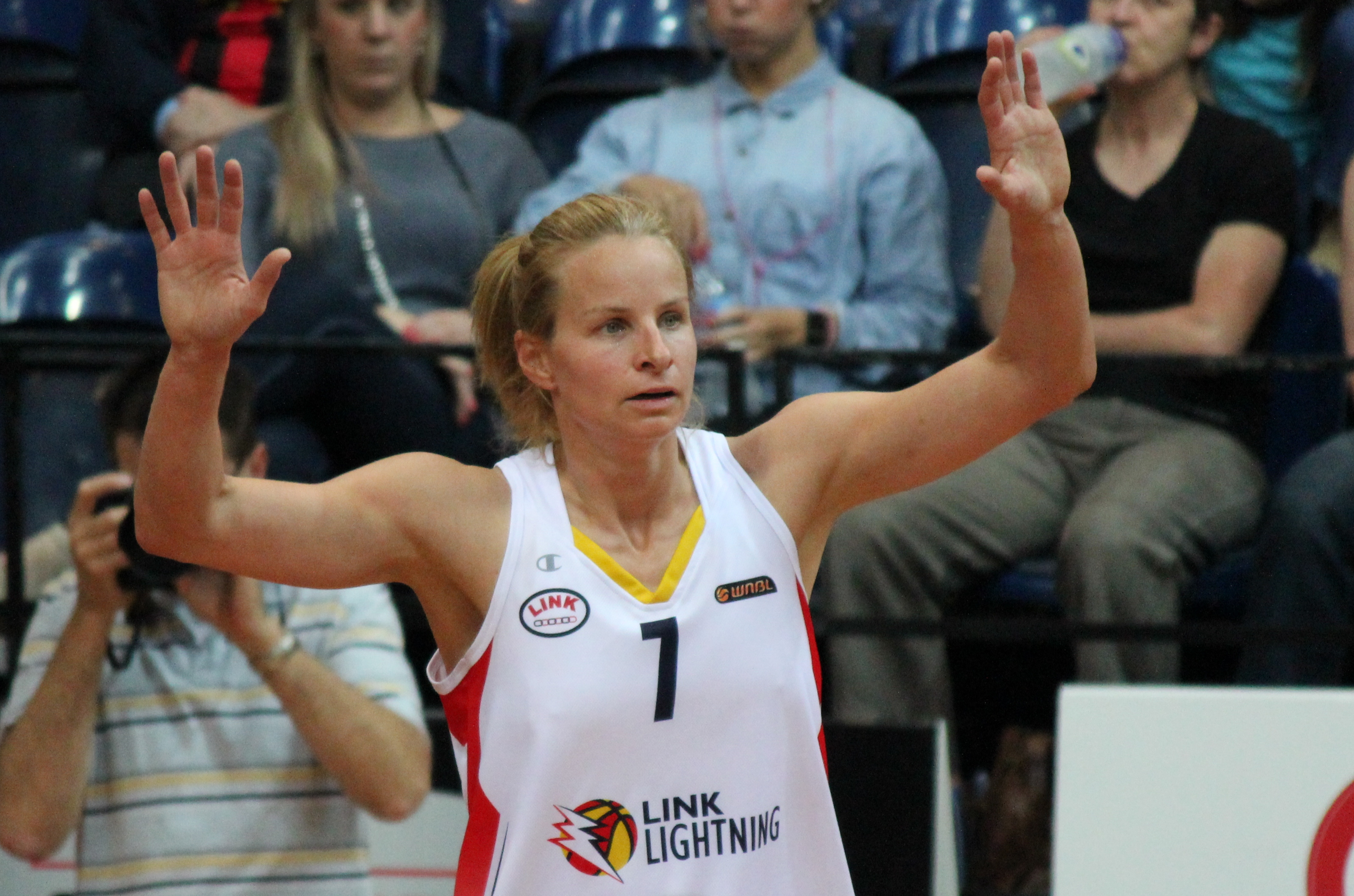

Personal information
- Full name: Joanne Kay Hill
- Born: 19 June 1973 (age 53) Murray Bridge, South Australia
Medal record
Women's Basketball
Representing Australia
Olympic Games
Silver medal – second place	2000 Sydney	Team competition
World Championships
Bronze medal – third place	1998 Germany	Team competition
World Junior Championships
Gold medal – first place	1993 South Korea	Team competition

Joanne Kay Hill (born 19 June 1973) is a former Australian women's basketball player.

== Biography ==
Hill played for the Australia women's national basketball team during the late 1990s and early 2000s, and competed at the 2000 Summer Olympics in Sydney, where she won a silver medal. She attended the Australian Institute of Sport in 1992-1993. Hill also represented Australia at the 1998 World Championship in Germany, where she won a bronze medal. In 1993, Hill was a member of Australia's first ever basketball gold medal winning team at the World Championships for Junior Women held in South Korea. While playing for the Opals, Hill was known as a talented and versatile player, who provided spark off the bench.

In the domestic Women's National Basketball League (WNBL) Hill played over 300 games for North Adelaide (1989 - 1991), the Australian Institute of Sport (1992 - 1993), Adelaide Lightning (1994 - 1999/00 and 2011/12), Canberra Capitals (2003/04) and Townsville Fire (2009/10 - 2010/11). Along with Hill, only 8 other players have played 300 or more games in the WNBL. Had Hill not played several seasons in France and Spain during the mid to late 2000s, it was likely that she would have broken the 377 games record held by her former teammate Rachael Sporn and Lucille Baillie.

At 37, Hill announced her retirement from professional basketball at the conclusion of the 2010/11 WNBL season. However, she was enticed out of retirement to return to play for Adelaide Lightning for the 2011-12 season, where she was appointed captain.

=== Awards ===
In 1993, Hill won the Halls Medal for the best and fairest player in the South Australian Women's competition. In season 1999/00, Hill was named into the WNBL All-Star Five. In 2003/04, Hill was awarded WNBL Life Membership.
