= 1981 WIBC season =

- League: Women's National Basketball League
- Sport: Basketball
- Duration: 19 June 1981 –
- Teams: 9
- TV partner: ABC

Regular season
- Top seed: North Adelaide Rockets
- Top scorer: Julie Nykiel (Noarlunga Tigers)

Finals
- Champions: St. Kilda Saints
- Runners-up: North Adelaide Rockets

WNBL seasons
- None 1982 →

The Women's Interstate Basketball Conference (WIBC) was the inaugural season of what would become the Australian Women's National Basketball League (WNBL).

== History ==
On 4 October 1980, during the Australian Women’s Club Championship in Sydney, a meeting of delegates from six of the leading clubs in Australian women’s basketball was held. The clubs were North Adelaide Rockets, West Adelaide Bearcats and Glenelg from South Australia and CYMS (Catholic Young Men's Society), Melbourne Telstars and St. Kilda Saints from Victoria.

The meeting resolved to form a two-round competition between these teams to be held in July and August in 1981. The basis for the idea was that many of the top sides in both states wanted a varied competition from their standard state leagues as well as a suitable preparation for the Australian Club Championship, which was held on an annual basis for the top 24 teams in the country. With the formation of the men's National Basketball League in 1979, the women felt that one of the best ways to develop the game was to provide more opportunities for the best players and clubs to play against each other more regularly.

A major consideration was finance and with this in mind the competition was formed with the six teams with a full home and away series between all teams with three games on one weekend to save costs. The New South Welsh teams of Bankstown Bruins and Sutherland Sharks were not happy due to costs and offered to pay their own way to Melbourne and Adelaide where they would play each team once for double points.

In 1981, the Australian Institute of Sport was also opened and the men's head coach Dr. Adrian Hurley contacted the clubs and asked whether the AIS could also participate in the competition to commence later that year.

The competition commenced on 19 June 1981 with the first game to be played in Adelaide between the AIS and West Adelaide Bearcats.

The competition was named the Women’s Interstate Basketball Conference with each the teams paying the sum of $25 to be a part of the WIBC – giving a central fund of $200 to conduct the competition.

== Ladder ==
The ladder at the end of the regular season.

	Team	Played	Won	Lost	For	Against	Won %	%
1	North Adelaide Rockets	13	10	3	832	713	77	116.69
2	St. Kilda Saints	13	11	2	892	751	85	118.77
3	West Adelaide Bearcats	13	6	7	803	848	46	94.69
4	Melbourne Telstars	13	8	5	880	786	62	111.96
5	Bankstown Bruins	10	6	4	599	571	60	104.9
6	Catholic Young Men's Society	13	5	8	807	840	38	96.07
7	Noarlunga Tigers	13	4	9	828	957	31	86.52
8	Australian Institute of Sport	10	2	8	581	656	20	88.57
9	Sutherland Sharks	10	2	8	523	623	20	83.95

== Finals ==
Semi-finals
2	St Kilda Saints	80
3	West Adelaide Bearcats	53
1	North Adelaide Rockets	66
4	Melbourne Telstars	63

Grand Final
2	St Kilda Saints	77
1	North Adelaide Rockets	58

The inaugural winner was St. Kilda Saints defeating North Adelaide Rockets 77 points to 58. St. Kilda Saints also went on to win the Victorian State Championship and the Australian Club Championship in Melbourne defeating Bankstown Bruins in the final. St. Kilda Saints had three Australian representatives in Tracy Morris, Karen Ogden and Patricia Cockrem.
