= Kathleen MacLeod =

Australian basketball player

No. 44 – Dandenong Rangers
- Position: Guard
- League: WNBL

Personal information
- Born: 23 October 1986 (age 40) Melbourne, Victoria, Australia
- Listed height: 168 cm (5 ft 6 in)

Career information
- Playing career: 2003–present

Career history
- 2003–2005: Australian Institute of Sport
- 2005–2007: Dandenong Rangers
- 2007–2008: Bendigo Spirit
- 2010–present: Dandenong Rangers

Career highlights
- WNBL Champion (2012); WNBL Grand Final MVP (2012); WNBL Rookie of the Year (2004); WNBL All-Star Five (2008, 2011, 2012, 2013)

Kathleen MacLeod (born 23 October 1986) is an Australian basketball player who was part of the Australian team that won the bronze medal at the 2012 Summer Olympics.

== Personal ==
MacLeod is from Melbourne. She has four siblings, two brothers and two sisters. She is 168 centimetres (66 in) tall.

== Basketball ==
MacLeod is a guard. As a competitor at the 2005 Australian Under-20 national championships, she won the Bob Staunton Award. She played junior basketball for the Victorian-based Nunawading Spectres. She played basketball in Hungary in 2008/2009 and France in 2009/2010.

=== WNBL ===
MacLeod had a scholarship with the Australian Institute of Sport in 2003 and 2004, and was a member of their team during the 2003/2004 and in 2004/2005 seasons. MacLeod joined and played the Dandenong Rangers during the 2005/2006 season, and continued to play for them in 2006/2007. She missed the first third of the season because she was injured. In the team's 66-61 preliminary loss to the Adelaide Lightning, she scored only 11 points as the only other player on the team to score in the double digits. For the 2007/2008 season, MacLeod was a member of the Bendigo Spirit. In a January 2008 game against Townsville, she scored 28 points in an 83–78 loss for Bendigo. MacLeod played for the WNBL's Dandenong Rangers in 2010/2011, where she was the team's leader alongside Abby Bishop. In a February 2011 game victory for the Dandenong Rangers over Townsville Fire with a score of 70–54, she scored 14 points. She continued to play for Dandenong in 2011/2012, helping guide her team to the WNBL's championship. She was named to the WNBL's All-Star Five. She played guard for the Rangers.

=== National team ===
MacLeod was a member of the 2005 Opals. In March 2007, she was named to the national team what would prepare for the 2008 Summer Olympics. In late March, early April 2008, she participated in a week-long training camp with the national team in Canberra. She played in a three-game test series Taiwan in May 2008. She was named to the 2012 Australia women's national basketball team. She was scheduled to participate in the national team training camp held from 14 to 18 May 2012 at the Australian Institute of Sport.

== See also ==
- WNBL Rookie of the Year Award
