= Jennifer Screen =

Australian basketball player

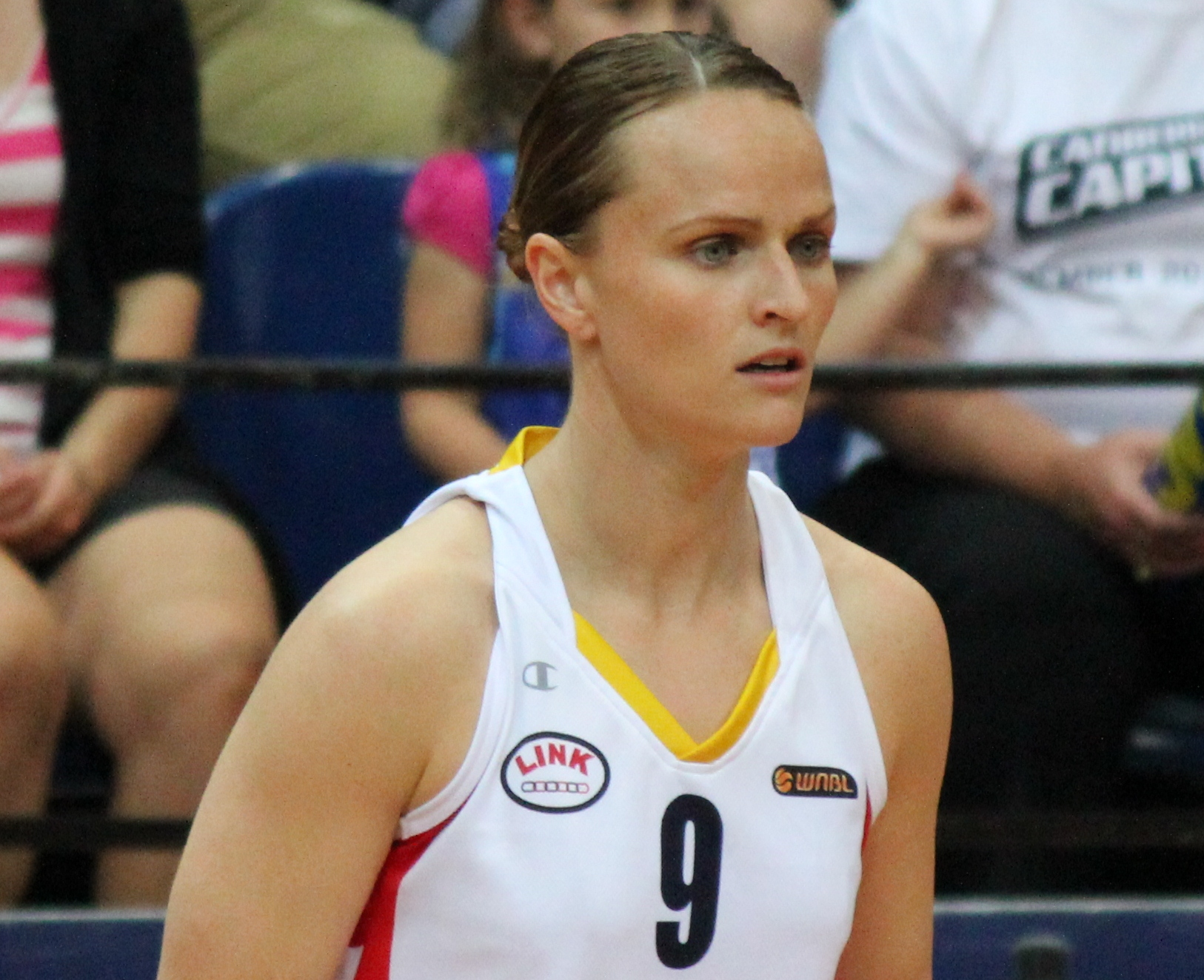
- In a game for the Adelaide Lightning against Canberra

Adelaide Lightning
- Position: Guard
- League: WNBL

Personal information
- Born: 26 February 1983 (age 43) Newcastle, New South Wales
- Listed height: 180 cm (5 ft 11 in)
- Listed weight: 67 kg (148 lb)
Medals
Women's basketball
Representing Australia
Olympic Games
Silver medal – second place	2008 Beijing	Team competition
Bronze medal – third place	2012 London	Team
World Championship
Gold medal – first place	2006 Brazil	Team competition
Commonwealth Games
Gold medal – first place	2006 Melbourne	Team competition

Jennifer (Jennie) Screen (born 26 February 1983) is an Australian basketball player. She has played for the Australian Institute of Sport, the Adelaide Fellas and the Adelaide Lightning in Australia's WNBL, and has spent time playing professionally for Parma in Italy. As a member of the Australia women's national basketball team, she has won a gold medal at the 2006 Commonwealth Games, a silver medal at the 2008 Summer Olympics and a bronze medal at the 2012 Summer Olympics.

== Personal ==
Screen was born on 26 February 1983 in Newcastle, New South Wales, She is 180 centimetres (71 in) tall.

At Christmas time in 2006, she became engaged. On 30 June 2007, she married Neil Mottram, a basketball player. The ceremony took place in Adelaide. In 2007, she was living in Italy. In 2010, if you googled her on Italian Google, one of the first search results for her showed off her basketball skills.

== Basketball ==
Screen is a guard. She has been described as a basketball sniper. She played junior basketball in Toowoomba, Queensland.

=== Europe ===
Screen has played professional basketball in Italy, starting in 2006/2007 when she played for Parma. In her first season with the team, she averaged 11 points per game during the regular season. In 2007/2008, she averaged 9.9 points per game and 6.0 rebounds per game with Parma, where she played guard. In the 2008/2009 season with Parma, she played 23 games, averaging 9.4 points per game and 6 rebounds per game.

=== WNBL ===
In 1999 and 2000, Screen had a scholarship with and played for the Australian Institute of Sport during the 1999/2000 and 2000/2001 seasons. She played for the Adelaide Lightning in 2001/2002, 2002/2003, 2003/2004 and 2004/2005. In February 2005, she was awarded the WNBL's Good Hands award. She played for the Adelaide Fellas in 2005/2006. She played for the Adelaide Lightning in 2011/2012.

=== National team ===
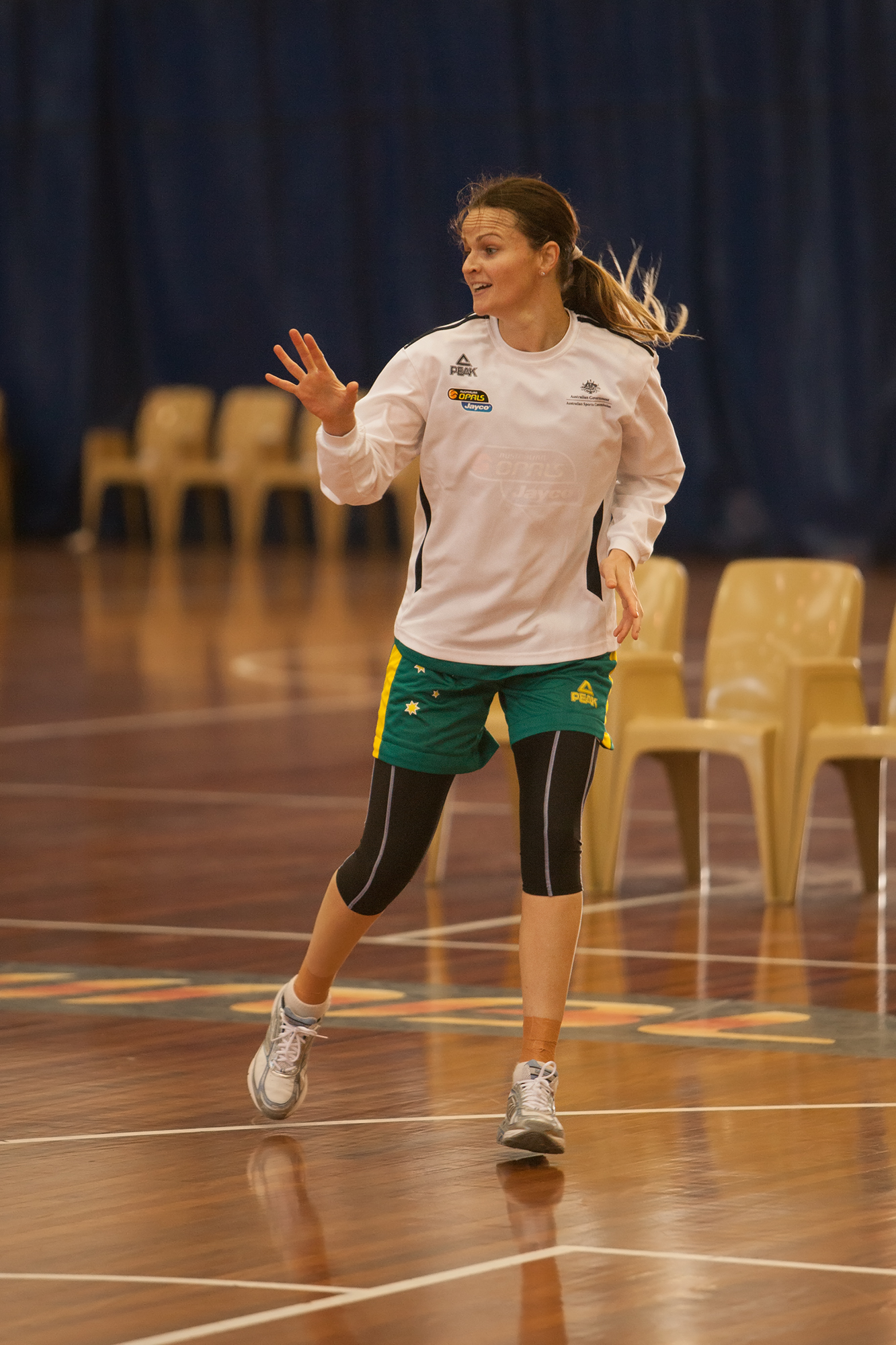
Jennifer Screen at the Opals training camp

Screen played 19 games for the Australian junior team and 11 games for the Young Australian team. She has also represented Australia on the university team. In 2001, she was a member of the Australian Junior Women's Team that won a gold medal at the World Championships in the Czech Republic. In 2002, she was a member of the Australian Junior Women's Team that won a gold medal in the World Qualification Series. She was a member of the Australian team at the 2005 University Games, and took home a bronze. In the bronze medal match against Russia, she scored 30 points in Australia 81–72 victory.

Screen was named to the Australian Opals for the first time in 2005. In 2006, she was a member of the Australian women's senior team that won a gold medal at the Commonwealth Games. In 2006, she was a member of the Australian women's senior team that won a gold medal at the World Championships in Brazil. This was her first major call up to the national team.

In March 2007, Screen was named to the national team what would prepare for the 2008 Summer Olympics. She played in a three-game test series Taiwan in May 2008. She was a member of the 2008 Summer Olympics Australian women's team that won a silver medal at the Olympics.

In mid-2010, Screen participated in a tour of China, USA and Hungary. In 2010, she was trying to make the team to play at the World Championships in the Czech Republic. She was named to the 2012 Australia women's national basketball team. She was scheduled to participate in the national team training camp held from 14 to 18 May 2012 at the Australian Institute of Sport.
