= Katrina Hibbert =

Australian basketball player (born 1977)

Personal information
- Born: 29 September 1977 (age 49) Melbourne, Victoria, Australia
- Listed height: 5 ft 11 in (1.80 m)

Career information
- College: Louisiana State (1996–2000)
- WNBA draft: 2000: 4th round, 57th overall pick
- Drafted by: Seattle Storm
- Playing career: 2000–2009
- Coaching career: 2017–present

Career history

Playing
- 2000: Seattle Storm
- 2000–2001: Dandenong Rangers
- 2001–2006: Bulleen Boomers
- 2002–2004: Szolnoki MÁV Coop
- 2006–2008: TSV 1880 Wasserburg
- 2008–2009: Bulleen Boomers

Coaching
- 2017–2018: Melbourne Boomers (assistant)
- 2019–2020: Sydney Uni Flames

Career highlights
- As player: 2× WNBL Most Valuable Player (2005, 2006); 2× WNBL All-Star Five (2005, 2006)
- Stats at Basketball Reference
Medals
Women's Basketball
Representing Australia
Commonwealth Games
Gold medal – first place	2006 Melbourne	Team competition
Oceania Championship
Gold medal – first place	2005 New Zealand	Team competition

Katrina Hibbert (born 29 September 1977) is an Australian basketball coach and retired professional basketball player.

== Playing career ==
=== College ===
In her final year of High School, Hibbert travelled on exchange to the United States where she would attend Denham Springs High School, Louisiana, hoping to secure a college basketball scholarship. Hibbert played college basketball at Louisiana State University in Baton Rouge, Louisiana, playing with the Lady Tigers in the Southeastern Conference of NCAA Division I.

=== WNBA ===
After Hibbert spent four years playing college basketball she would then go on to be drafted in round 4 (pick 57 overall) of the 2000 WNBA draft by the Seattle Storm. In her first and only season, Hibbert played 20 games and has the honour of scoring the franchise's first ever points. Hibbert was released before the start of the 2001 WNBA season and returned to Australia.

=== WNBL ===
In the domestic Women's National Basketball League (WNBL) Hibbert played 112 games for the Bulleen Boomers. During her WNBL career, Hibbert was named the Most Valuable Player on two occasions; 2004/05 and 2005/06. Hibbert was also named to the WNBL All-Star Five on two occasions; 2004/05 and 2005/06. Hibbert was a member of the national team roster during the 2000s and played in the Australian team that won a gold medal at the 2006 Commonwealth Games. Hibbert announced her retirement from WNBL basketball in March 2009.

== Coaching career ==
=== WNBL ===
After brief head coaching stints in the Big V with the Hume City Broncos and Eltham Wildcats, Hibbert took on a Lead Assistant Coach position with the Melbourne Boomers, under head coach Guy Molloy. Following on from this, Hibbert was then appointed as Head Coach of the Sydney Uni Flames ahead of the 2019–20 season.

== Coaching record ==
Legend
Regular season	G	Games coached	W	Games won	L	Games lost	W–L %	Win–loss %
Playoffs	PG	Playoff games	PW	Playoff wins	PL	Playoff losses	PW–L %	Playoff win–loss %

=== WNBL ===
Team	Year	G	W	L	W–L%	Finish	PG	PW	PL	PW–L%	Result
Sydney	2019–20	21	7	14	.333	6th of 8	–	–	–	–	
Career		21	7	14	.333		0	0	0	–	

== See also ==
- List of Australian WNBA players
