= Sydney Flames =

- Leagues: WNBL
- Founded: 1981
- History: Bankstown Bruins; 1981–1988; Sydney Bruins; 1989–1990; Sydney Flames; 1991–2000; Sydney Panthers; 2000–2002; Sydney Flames; 2002–2003; Sydney Uni Flames; 2003–2022; Sydney Flames; 2022–present
- Arena: Quaycentre; Qudos Bank Arena
- Location: Sydney, New South Wales
- Team colors: Black, pink and white
- CEO: Chris Pongrass (outgoing)
- General manager: James Newman (incoming)
- Head coach: Renae Garlepp
- Ownership: Hoops Capital Pty Ltd
- Championships: 4 (1993, 1997, 2001, 2017)
- Website: sydneyflames.wnbl.com.au

The Sydney Flames are an Australian professional basketball team based in Sydney, New South Wales. The Flames compete in the Women's National Basketball League (WNBL) and play their home games at Quaycentre. The club has won four WNBL championships, in 1993, 1997, 2001 and 2017.

== History ==
The club began as the Bankstown Bruins in the 1981 WIBC season. The Bruins were WNBL runners-up in 1982 with a grand final defeat to St Kilda. They competed as the Bankstown Bruins until 1988, when for the 1989 season they were renamed the Sydney Bruins. In 1991, they were renamed the Sydney Flames. In 2000, they were renamed the Sydney Panthers. After two seasons as the Panthers, the club returned to the Sydney Flames for the 2002–03 season.

In 2003, they were renamed the Sydney Uni Flames. The University of Sydney and Sydney Uni Sport and Fitness owned the Flames for 17 years, selling the club to the owners of the Sydney Kings in 2020. The team remained as the Sydney Uni Flames for two more seasons.

In 2022, the team rebranded back to the Sydney Flames.

== Season summaries ==
=== Season-by-season record ===
Season	Standings	Regular season			Finals	Head coach
Season	Standings	W	L	PCT	Finals	Head coach
Bankstown Bruins
1981	5th	6	4	60.0	Did Not Quality	Robbie Cadee
1982	1st	10	2	83.3	Won Semi-Final (West Adelaide Bearcats, 71–66) Loss Grand Final (St Kilda Saints, 56–62)	Robbie Cadee
1983	8th	5	12	29.4	Did Not Quality	Kevin Landon
1984	5th	12	6	66.6	Did Not Quality	Steve Farnham
1985	8th	7	12	36.8	Did Not Quality	Alan Morris
1986	9th	8	16	33.3	Did Not Quality	Rick Bywater
1987	8th	8	12	40.0	Did Not Quality	Robbie Cadee
1988	3rd	16	6	72.7	Loss Semi-Final (West Adelaide Bearcats, 56–73)	Robbie Cadee
Sydney Bruins
1989	5th	14	8	63.6	Did Not Quality	Robbie Cadee
1990	7th	13	11	54.1	Did Not Quality	Bernie Slattery
Sydney Flames
1991	9th	10	12	45.4	Did Not Quality	Bernie Slattery
1992	9th	7	13	53.8	Did Not Quality	Bernie Slattery
1993	1st	17	1	94.4	Won Semi-Final (Adelaide, 64–59) Won Grand Final (Perth, 65–64)	Carrie Graf
1994	3rd	14	4	77.7	Loss Semi-Final (Perth, 58–62)	Carrie Graf
1995	2nd	16	2	88.8	Loss Semi-Final (Adelaide, 63–73)	Carrie Graf
1996	1st	17	1	94.4	Won Semi-Final (Adelaide, 57–54) Loss Grand Final (Adelaide, 80–65)	Carrie Graf
1997	1st	18	0	100	Loss Semi-Final (Adelaide, 54–58) Won Preliminary Final (Melbourne Tigers, 57–54) Won Grand Final (Adelaide, 61–56)	Bill Tomlinson
1998	1st	10	2	83.3	Won (Adelaide, 61–42) Loss (Adelaide, 67–56)	Murray Wardle
1998–99	6th	10	11	47.6	Did Not Quality	Murray Wardle
1999–00	6th	10	11	47.6	Did Not Quality	Bill Tomlinson
Sydney Panthers
2000–01	2nd	16	5	76.1	Loss Semi-Final (Canberra, 56–73) Won Preliminary Final (Dandenong, 78–72) Won Grand Final (Canberra, 69–65)	Karen Dalton
2001–02	4th	13	8	61.9	Won Semi-Final (Dandenong, 98–85) Won Preliminary Final (Adelaide, 66–64) Loss Grand Final (Canberra, 69–75)	Karen Dalton
Sydney Flames
2002–03	3rd	14	7	66.6	Won Semi-Final (Adelaide, 72–70) Won Preliminary Final (Townsville, 83–78) Loss Grand Final (Canberra, 67–69)	Karen Dalton
Sydney Uni Flames
2003–04	2nd	13	8	61.9	Loss Semi-Final (Dandenong, 68–85) Won Preliminary Final (Adelaide, 65–61) Loss Grand Final (Dandenong, 53–63)	Karen Dalton
2004–05	3rd	16	5	76.1	Won Semi-Final (Adelaide, 94–93) Won Preliminary Final (Bulleen, 79–71) Loss Grand Final (Dandenong, 47–52)	Karen Dalton
2005–06	5th	13	8	61.9	Did Not Quality	Karen Dalton
2006–07	1st	16	5	76.1	Won Semi-Final (Canberra, 74–65) Loss Grand Final (Canberra, 59–73)	Karen Dalton
2007–08	2nd	17	7	70.8	Won Semi-Final (Adelaide, 90–71) Loss Grand Final (Adelaide, 92–82)	Karen Dalton
2008–09	6th	9	13	42.8	Did Not Quality	Karen Dalton
2009–10	2nd	17	5	77.2	Loss Semi-Final (Bulleen, 55–72) Loss Preliminary Final (Canberra, 56–61)	Karen Dalton
2010–11	6th	10	12	45.4	Did Not Quality	Karen Dalton
2011–12	5th	13	9	59.0	Loss Elimination Final (Townsville, 78–85)	Karen Dalton
2012–13	7th	7	17	29.1	Did Not Quality	Karen Dalton
2013–14	6th	10	14	41.6	Did Not Quality	Karen Dalton
2014–15	4th	11	11	50.0	Won Semi-Final (Dandenong, 89–80) Loss Preliminary Final (Bendigo, 77–85)	Shannon Seebohm
2015–16	5th	13	11	54.1	Did Not Quality	Shannon Seebohm
2016–17	1st	18	6	75.0	Won Semi-Final (Townsville, 2–0) Won Grand Final (Dandenong, 2–0)	Cheryl Chambers
2017–18	2nd	14	7	66.6	Loss Semi-Final (Townsville, 0–2)	Cheryl Chambers
2018–19	8th	2	19	9.5	Did Not Quality	Cheryl Chambers
2019–20	6th	7	14	33.3	Did Not Quality	Katrina Hibbert
2020	5th	5	8	38.4	Did Not Quality	Katrina Hibbert
2021–22	8th	4	13	23.5	Did Not Quality	Shane Heal
Sydney Flames
2022–23	6th	6	15	28.5	Did Not Quality	Shane Heal
2023–24	5th	11	10	52.3	Did Not Quality	Guy Molloy
2024–25	4th	8	13	38.1	Loss Semi-Final (Bendigo, 0-2)	Guy Molloy
Regular season		513	383	57.2	7 Minor Premierships	
Finals		21	20	51.2	4 WNBL Championships	

== Players ==
=== Current roster ===
2025–26 Sydney Flames roster
Players
Coaches

Pos.	No.	Nat.	Name	Ht.
G	0	(France)	Époupa, Olivia (I)	1.65 m (5 ft 5 in)
G	1	(Australia)	Nicholson, Lauren (C)	1.83 m (6 ft 0 in)
F	2	(Australia)	Morgan, Isabelle (DP)	1.78 m (5 ft 10 in)
G	3	(Australia)	Cann, Mikhaela	1.73 m (5 ft 8 in)
G	4	(Australia)	Pitman, Carla	1.80 m (5 ft 11 in)
G	6	(Australia)	Swain, Shaneice	1.75 m (5 ft 9 in)
	8	(Australia)	Miller, Zoey
G	11	(Australia)	Emma-Nnopu, Agnes	1.80 m (5 ft 11 in)
G	12	(Australia)	Martin, Caitlyn (DP)	1.62 m (5 ft 4 in)
F	14	(Australia)	McSpadden, Lara	1.93 m (6 ft 4 in)
F	21	(Australia)	Froling, Keely	1.88 m (6 ft 2 in)
G	22	(Australia)	Perkins, Ruby (DP)	1.73 m (5 ft 8 in)
	24	(Australia)	McDowell-White, Jessica
F	30	(Australia)	Norris, Madeleine	1.88 m (6 ft 2 in)
F	52	(United States)	Thompson, Unique (I)	1.90 m (6 ft 3 in)

Head coach

- (Australia) Renae Garlepp

Assistant coach(es)

- (Australia) Tom Garlepp
- (Australia) Macsen Monk

Legend

- (C) Team captain
- (DP) Development player
- (I) Import player
- Injured

- Roster
Updated: 27 December 2025

== Coaches and staff ==
=== Head coaches ===
Sydney Flames head coaches
Name	Start	End	Seasons	Regular season				Finals			
Name	Start	End	Seasons	W	L	PCT	G	W	L	PCT	G
Robbie Cadee ^{[a]}	1981	1982	5	54	32	62.7	86	1	2	33.3	3
Kevin Landon	1983	1983	1	5	12	29.4	17	0	0	0.00	0
Steve Farnham	1984	1984	1	12	6	66.6	18	0	0	0.00	0
Alan Morris	1985	1985	1	7	12	36.8	19	0	0	0.0	0
Rick Bywater	1986	1986	1	8	16	33.3	24	0	0	0.0	0
Robbie Cadee ^{[a]}	1987	1989	5	54	32	62.7	86	1	2	33.3	3
Bernie Slattery	1990	1992	3	30	36	45.4	66	0	0	0.0	0
Carrie Graf	1993	1996	4	64	8	88.8	72	3	4	42.8	7
Bill Tomlinson ^{[b]}	1997	1997	2	28	11	71.7	39	2	1	66.6	3
Murray Wardle	1998	1999	2	20	13	60.6	33	1	1	50.0	2
Bill Tomlinson ^{[b]}	1999	2000	2	28	11	71.7	39	2	1	66.6	3
Karen Dalton	2000	2014	14	185	122	60.2	307	11	11	50.0	22
Shannon Seebohm	2014	2016	2	24	22	52.2	46	1	1	50.0	2
Cheryl Chambers	2016	2019	3	34	32	51.5	66	4	2	66.6	6
Katrina Hibbert	2019	2021	1	0	0	0.0	0	0	0	0.0	0
Shane Heal	2021	2023	2	8	22	26	0	0	0	0.0	0
Shelley Gorman	2023	2023	1	2	6	25	0	0	0	0.0	0
Guy Molloy	2023		1								

Notes

- ^{a} Across the years of 1981–1989, Robbie Cadee coached four seasons (1981–1982, 1987–1989)
- ^{b} Across the years of 1997–2000, Bill Tomlinson coached two seasons (1997 & 1999–00)
- Win/Loss statistics stand as of the end of the 2018–19 WNBL season
