= Geelong Venom =

- Leagues: WNBL
- Founded: 1984
- History: Bulleen Boomers; 1984–2013; Melbourne Boomers; 2013–2024; Geelong United; 2024–2025; Geelong Venom; 2025–present
- Arena: Geelong Arena
- Capacity: 2,000
- Location: Geelong, Victoria
- Team colors: Navy, white, lime green
- CEO: Mark Neeld
- Head coach: Cheryl Chambers
- Team captain: Alexandra Sharp
- Championships: 2 (2011, 2022)
- Website: geelongvenom.wnbl.com.au

The Geelong Venom are an Australian professional basketball team based in Geelong, Victoria. The Venom compete in the Women's National Basketball League (WNBL) and play their home games at Geelong Arena.

Beginning as the Bulleen Boomers in 1984, the team underwent a name change in 2013 to Melbourne Boomers. In 2024, the Boomers' WNBL licence was transferred to Geelong United Basketball. In 2025, the team underwent a rebrand from Geelong United to Geelong Venom.

== History ==
Bulleen-Templestowe Basketball Club (BTBC) was established in 1969. In 1984, BTBC secured a licence to join the Women's National Basketball League (WNBL), marking the debut of the Bulleen Boomers.

The Boomers were first coached by Trevor Cook, with the initial team including Michele Timms and Samantha Thornton. The club first qualified for the WNBL finals in 1989 under the guidance of coach Paul Deacon, and, after progressing to the same stage the following year, missed the playoffs until 1996. In coach Lori Chizik's first season, Bulleen finished third in the regular season before bowing out in the semi-finals. Chizik led the Boomers to the 1999–2000 preliminary final, marking the club's best-ever result to that point. Cheryl Chambers then took over in 2001–02 and steered the club to two finals appearances, including the 2004–05 preliminary final. Katrina Hibbert and Hollie Grima formed the backbone of the Boomers during the 2000s. Hibbert won back-to-back League MVP awards during the 2004–05 and 2005–06 seasons.

Bulleen made four straight WNBL grand finals between 2008–09 and 2011–12, winning their first championship in 2010–11 behind Desiree Glaubitz, Sharin Milner, Liz Cambage, Rachel Jarry, Jenna O'Hea and coach Tom Maher.

In 2013, BTBC changed the team name to Melbourne Boomers to target a wider area of population and boost crowd numbers. The team also changed its colours from blue and gold to purple and gold, and moved their home games to the State Basketball Centre in Wantirna. In 2014, Deakin University joined as a naming rights partner. In 2016, a new ownership group took over the Boomers' license from BTBC.

In the 2017–18 season, the Boomers reached the grand final but lost to the Townsville Fire. In the 2021–22 season, the Boomers won their second WNBL championship under coach Guy Molloy.

In March 2024, Geelong United Basketball (GUB) and a consortium of local private investors from Geelong expressed interest in acquiring the Boomers' licence after the Boomers' ownership group looked to transfer its licence. Two months later, the license was officially transferred to GUB, with the team moving to Geelong under a new brand Geelong United. In the 2024–25 WNBL season, Geelong United finished in seventh place with a 6–15 record.

On 1 July 2025, GUB rebranded the WNBL team as Geelong Venom.

== Home venues ==
The franchise has had a number of home venues, including Sheahan's Road Basketball Centre, Keilor Basketball Stadium, Melbourne Entertainment Centre, the Veneto Club, State Basketball Centre (2013–2023), and Parkville Stadium (2021–2024).

With the move to Geelong in 2024, the home venue shifted to Geelong Arena.

== Season-by-season records ==
Season	Standings	Regular season			Finals	Head coach
Season	Standings	W	L	PCT	Finals	Head coach
Bulleen Boomers
1984	9th	5	13	27.7	Did Not Quality	Trevor Cook
1985	10th	3	15	16.6	Did Not Quality	Trevor Cook
1986	12th	5	19	20.8	Did Not Quality	Trevor Cook
1987	11th	3	17	15.0	Did Not Quality	Trevor Cook
1988	10th	5	17	22.7	Did Not Quality	Trevor Cook
1989	4th	16	8	66.6	Loss Semi-Final (Nunawading Spectres, 68-69)	Paul Deacon
1990	3rd	17	7	70.8	Loss Semi-Final (Nunawading Spectres, 69-89)	Lori Chizik
1991	6th	11	11	50.0	Did Not Quality	Lori Chizik
1992	6th	10	10	50.0	Did Not Quality	Lori Chizik
1993	7th	7	11	38.8	Did Not Quality	Lori Chizik
1994	8th	5	13	27.7	Did Not Quality	Lori Chizik
1995	7th	6	12	33.3	Did Not Quality	Lori Chizik
1996	3rd	14	4	77.7	Loss Semi-Final (Perth, 58-75)	Lori Chizik
1997	9th	5	13	27.7	Did Not Quality	Lori Chizik
1998	7th	3	9	25.0	Did Not Quality	Lori Chizik
1998–99	5th	11	10	52.3	Did Not Quality	Lori Chizik
1999–00	3rd	11	10	52.3	Won Semi-Final (Perth, 61-60) Loss Premliminary Final (Canberra, 66-80)	Lori Chizik
2000–01	6th	7	14	33.3	Did Not Quality	Lori Chizik
2001–02	6th	6	15	28.5	Did Not Quality	Cheryl Chambers
2002–03	6th	6	15	28.5	Did Not Quality	Cheryl Chambers
2003–04	6th	7	9	43.7	Did Not Quality	Cheryl Chambers
2004–05	2nd	16	5	76.1	Loss Semi-Final (Dandenong, 59-63) Loss Premliminary Final (Sydney, 71-79)	Cheryl Chambers
2005–06	4th	13	8	61.9	Loss Semi-Final (Canberra, 62-67)	Cheryl Chambers
2006–07	5th	12	9	57.1	Did Not Quality	Cheryl Chambers
2007–08	5th	11	13	45.8	Did Not Quality	Cheryl Chambers
2008–09	2nd	17	5	77.2	Loss Semi-Final (Canberra, 52-60) Win Preliminary Final (Townsville, 79-68) Loss Grand Final (Canberra, 58-61)	Cheryl Chambers
2009–10	1st	21	1	95.4	Won Semi-Final (Sydney, 72-55) Loss Grand Final (Canberra, 70-75)	Tom Maher
2010–11	1st	19	3	86.3	Won Semi-Final (Canberra, 71-67) Won Grand Final (Canberra, 103-78)	Tom Maher
2011–12	2nd	15	7	68.1	Won Semi-Final (Adelaide, 73-70) Loss Grand Final (Dandenong, 70-94)	Tom Maher
2012–13	5th	10	14	41.6	Did Not Quality	Tom Maher
Melbourne Boomers
2013–14	4th	14	10	58.3	Loss Semi-Final (Townsville, 73-78)	Guy Molloy
2014–15	6th	11	11	50.0	Did Not Quality	Guy Molloy
2015–16	8th	8	16	33.3	Did Not Quality	Guy Molloy
2016–17	7th	5	19	20.8	Did Not Quality	Guy Molloy
2017–18	4th	12	9	57.1	Won Semi-Final (Perth, 2-0) Loss Grand Final (Townsville, 1-2)	Guy Molloy
2018–19	2nd	15	6	71.4	Loss Semi-Final (Adelaide, 0-2)	Guy Molloy
2019–20	3rd	15	6	71.4	Loss Semi-Final (Canberra, 1-2)	Guy Molloy
2020	4th	9	4	69.2	Won Semi-Final (Canberra, 78-68) Loss Preliminary Final (Townsville, 62-65)	Guy Molloy
2021–22	1st	12	5	70.5	Won Semi-Final (Adelaide, 2-0) Won Grand Final (Perth, 2-1)	Guy Molloy
2022–23	3rd	15	6	71.4	Loss Semi-Final (Southside, 1-2)	Chris Lucas
2023–24	3rd	12	9	57.1	Loss Semi-Final (Southside, 1-2)	Chris Lucas
Geelong United
2024–25	7th	6	15	28.6	Did Not Qualify	Chris Lucas
Regular season		431	430	50.1	3 Minor Premierships	
Finals		11	19	36.6	2 WNBL Championships	

== Players ==
=== Current roster ===
Geelong Venom roster
Players
Coaches

Pos.	No.	Nat.	Name	Ht.
G	1	(Australia)	Dimarco, Tayli (DP)	1.68 m (5 ft 6 in)
G	2	(Australia)	Rotunno, Lilly	1.71 m (5 ft 7 in)
G	3	(Australia)	Stevens, Poppy (DP)	1.72 m (5 ft 8 in)
G	4	(Australia)	Shelley, Jaz (C)	1.75 m (5 ft 9 in)
G	5	(Australia)	Brett, Elissa	1.83 m (6 ft 0 in)
G	7	(Australia)	Taylor, Georgia	1.77 m (5 ft 10 in)
G	9	(Australia)	Sharp, Alexandra (C)	1.82 m (6 ft 0 in)
G	10	(Australia)	Potter, Gemma	1.82 m (6 ft 0 in)
G	11	(Australia)	Mole, Taylor	1.88 m (6 ft 2 in)
F	12	(Australia)	Clinch Hoycard, Mackenzie	1.91 m (6 ft 3 in)
G	23	(Australia)	Heal, Shyla (injured)	1.68 m (5 ft 6 in)
F	35	(United States)	Pili, Alissa (injured) (I)	1.80 m (5 ft 11 in)
F	54	(United States)	Holmes, Mackenzie (I)	1.91 m (6 ft 3 in)

Head coach

- (Australia) Chris Lucas

Assistant coach(es)

- (United Kingdom) Megan Moody
- (Australia) Kaleb Sclater

Legend

- (C) Team captain
- (DP) Development player
- (I) Import player
- (NRP) Nominated replacement player
- Injured

- Roster
Updated: 26 October 2025

=== Former coaches ===
- (Australia) Cheryl Chambers
- (Australia) Guy Molloy

=== Former players ===
- (Australia) Lindsay Allen
- (Australia) Rebecca Allen
- (New Zealand) Stella Beck
- (Australia) Liz Cambage
- (Australia) Carley Ernst
- (Australia) Michele Timms
- (Australia) Allison Tranquilli
- (Australia) Debbie Slimmon
- (Australia) Samantha Thornton
- (Australia) Katrina Hibbert
- (Australia) Sharin Milner
- (Australia) Desiree Glaubitz
- (Australia) Hollie Grima
- (Australia) Rachel Jarry
- (Australia) Alice Kunek
- (Australia) Jenna O'Hea
- (New Zealand) Ashleigh Karaitiana
- (New Zealand) Antonia Farnworth
- (Australia) Madeleine Garrick
- (New Zealand) Kalani Purcell
- (Australia) Izzy Wright
- (Australia) Ezi Magbegor
