= Adelaide Lightning =

Women's basketball team

- Leagues: WNBL
- Founded: 1993
- History: Adelaide Lightning; 1993–2005; 2006–present Adelaide Fellas; 2005–2006
- Arena: State Basketball Centre
- Location: Wayville, South Australia
- Team colors: Plum; Lavender; Mandarin
- CEO: Melanie MacGillivray
- General manager: Tess Madgen
- Head coach: Aja Parham-Ammar
- Ownership: WNBL
- Championships: 5 (1994, 1995, 1996, 1998, 2008)
- Website: Official website

The Adelaide Lightning are an Australian professional basketball team competing in the Women's National Basketball League (WNBL). The club is based in the city of Adelaide, South Australia, and will play their home games at the State Basketball Centre in Wayville from the 2025–26 season.

== History ==
The Adelaide Lightning were formed in 1993 as a South Australian composite team following multiple Adelaide team entries in the Women's National Basketball League (WNBL) since the league's inception in 1981. The Lightning originally played at the Clipsal Powerhouse.

Under coach Jan Stirling, the Lightning won three straight WNBL championships between 1994 and 1996. After a runner-up finish in 1997, the Lightning won their fourth championship in 1998. They finished runners-up again in 2000. Between 1993 and 2009, the team played in the WNBL playoffs every year.

The club's captain during its glory years of the 1990s was Rachael Sporn. Sporn represented Australia at three Olympic Games, winning two silver and one bronze medal, and three World Championships. She played 377 WNBL games and was named MVP in 1996 and 1997 and was a key member of the Lightning's four championships. She was inducted into the Australian Basketball Hall of Fame in 2007. Her number 14 jersey was retired in 2007.

The team changed to private ownership in 2005–06, with Fellas Gifts taking over the club and renaming the team to Adelaide Fellas. After one season, the team was sold to Link Engineering, with new owner Vince Marino changing the team name back to Adelaide Lightning for the 2006–07 WNBL season.

In the 2007–08 season, the Lightning won their fifth WNBL championship with a 92–82 grand final victory over the Sydney Uni Flames.

In the 2013–14 season, the Lightning entered a one-year management agreement with the Adelaide 36ers of the NBL, allowing the 36ers to oversee the club's marketing, membership, and sponsorship operations. This arrangement aimed to streamline resources between the two clubs. Following the 2014–15 season, Vince Marino relinquish the team's WNBL licence.

For the 2015–16 season, Basketball SA assumed control of the Lightning while seeking a new owner for the team.

In 2016–17, the Adelaide Basketball consortium took over the club and appointed Chris Lucas as head coach. The consortium was later sold to Grant Kelley, who managed the team through the 2017–18 and 2018–19 seasons. At the end of the 2018–19 season—during which the Lightning reached the Grand Final, ultimately falling to Canberra in Game 3—Kelley announced that Adelaide Basketball would return the team's licence.

On 5 March 2019, Bruce Spangler and a group of business associates were granted the licence to operate the Lightning for the 2019–20 season. Following the conclusion of the 2021–22 season, Spangler announced that ownership of the club had been transferred to the Pelligra Group, a property development company.

In September 2023, the Lightning and Rachael Sporn agreed to un-retire her number 14 jersey.

In September 2024, Pelligra informed the league of its intention to relinquish the licence at the end of the 2024–25 season. However, following the WNBL's announcement of a new ownership group set to assume control in 2025, Pelligra indicated it would reverse its decision. In late April 2025, the WNBL denied the Lightning entry into the 2025–26 season after declining Pelligra's request to continue in the league. As a result, all Lightning players were released from their contracts. On 8 May 2025, the club was saved from collapse after the South Australian Government agreed to fund a league-run team, with the government providing $571,000 to the club per year over three years while supporting the league in a transition to new ownership. The club subsequently gained access to train at the newly opened South Australian Sports Institute and moved its home games from Adelaide Arena to the State Basketball Centre in Wayville. A minority ownership group of South Australian investors later joined the club.

On 30 May 2025, the WNBL acquired the intellectual property of the Lightning name from former owner Pelligra. In August 2025, the club launched a new brand identity ahead of the 2025–26 WNBL season.

== Season-by-season records ==
Season	Standings	Regular season			Finals	Head coach
Season	Standings	W	L	PCT	Finals	Head coach
Adelaide Lightning
1993	2nd	16	2	88.8	Lost Semi Final (Sydney, 59–64); Lost Preliminary Final (Perth, 66–68)	Jan Stirling
1994	1st	16	2	88.8	Won Semi Final (Melbourne, 84–82); Won Grand Final (Melbourne, 84–77)	Jan Stirling
1995	1st	16	2	88.8	Won Semi Final (Sydney, 73–63); Won Grand Final (Melbourne, 50–43)	Jan Stirling
1996	2nd	16	2	88.8	Lost Semi Final (Sydney, 54–57); Won Preliminary Final (Perth, 87–55); Won Grand Final (Sydney, 80–65)	Jan Stirling
1997	2nd	14	4	77.7	Won Semi Final (Sydney, 58–54); Lost Grand Final (Sydney, 56–61)	Jan Stirling
1998	2st	9	3	75.0	Lost Semi Final (Sydney, 42–61); Won Preliminary Final (AIS, 81–54); Won Grand Final (Sydney, 67–57)	Jan Stirling
1998–99	3rd	12	9	57.1	Won Semi Final (Melbourne, 63–54); Lost Preliminary Final (Perth, 46–67)	Jan Stirling
1999–00	2nd	13	8	61.9	Won Semi Final (Canberra, 91–84); Lost Grand Final (Canberra, 50–67)	Jan Stirling
2000–01	3rd	15	6	71.4	Lost Semi Final (Dandenong, 71–83)	Jan Stirling
2001–02	1st	17	4	80.9	Lost Semi Final (Canberra, 62–66); Lost Preliminary Final (Sydney, 64–66)	Jan Stirling
2002–03	4th	12	9	57.1	Lost Semi Final (Sydney, 70–72)	Jan Stirling
2003–04	3rd	13	8	61.9	Won Semi Final (Canberra, 72–63); Lost Preliminary Final (Sydney, 61–65)	Jan Stirling
2004–05	4th	13	8	61.9	Lost Semi Final (Sydney, 93–94)	Chris Lucas
Adelaide Fellas
2005–06	2nd	14	7	66.6	Lost Semi Final (Dandenong, 70–75); Lost Preliminary Final (Canberra, 81–83)	Chris Lucas
Adelaide Lightning
2006–07	3rd	15	6	71.4	Won Semi Final (Dandenong, 66–61); Lost Preliminary Final (Canberra, 74–82)	Chris Lucas
2007–08	1st	21	3	87.5	Lost Semi Final (Sydney, 71–90); Won Preliminary Final (Dandenong, 74–64); Won Grand Final (Sydney, 92–82)	Vicki Valk
2008–09	4th	15	7	68.1	Won Elimination Final (Bendigo, 81–73); Lost Semi Final (Townsville, 78–91)	Vicki Valk
2009–10	6th	13	9	59.0	Did not qualify	Vicki Valk
2010–11	9th	3	19	13.6	Did not qualify	Stephen Breheny
2011–12	1st	18	4	81.8	Lost Semi Final (Bulleen, 70–73); Lost Preliminary Final (Dandenong, 78–91)	Peter Buckle
2012–13	3rd	18	6	75.0	Lost Semi Final (Townsville, 53–60)	Peter Buckle
2013–14	5th	12	12	50.0	Did not qualify	Peter Buckle; Richard Dickel
2014–15	7th	7	15	31.8	Did not qualify	Jeremi Moule
2015–16	7th	10	14	41.6	Did not qualify	Tracy York
2016–17	8th	3	21	12.5	Did not qualify	Chris Lucas
2017–18	5th	11	10	52.3	Did not qualify	Chris Lucas
2018–19	3rd	13	8	61.9	Won Semi Final (Melbourne, 2–0); Lost Grand Final (Canberra, 1–2)	Chris Lucas
2019–20	4th	12	9	57.1	Lost Semi Final (Southside, 0–2)	Chris Lucas
2020	6th	5	8	38.5	Did not qualify	Chris Lucas
2021–22	4th	10	7	58.8	Lost Semi Final (Melbourne Boomers, 0–2)	Chris Lucas
2022–23	7th	5	16	23.8	Did not qualify	Natalie Hurst
2023–24	7th	8	13	38.0	Did not qualify	Natalie Hurst
2024–25	6th	7	14	33.3	Did not qualify	Natalie Hurst; Scott Ninnis
Adelaide Lightning
2025–26	7th	6	17	26.1	Did not qualify	Kerryn Mitchell; Aja Parham-Ammar
Regular season		406	292	58.2	5 Minor Premierships	
Finals		19	27	41.3	5 WNBL Championships	

Source: Adelaide Lightning

== Statistics ==
Adelaide Lightning statistics
2010s
Season	PPG	RPG	APG	SPG	BPG
2010–11	A. Marino (15.2)	D. Walker (6.5)	A. Marino (4.2)	D. Walker (1.9)	D. Walker (1.9)
2011–12	S. Batkovic (24.6)	S. Batkovic (10.2)	A. Marino (3.5)	S. Batkovic (2.6)	S. Batkovic (1.6)
2012–13	S. Batkovic (21.0)	S. Batkovic (9.7)	J. Screen (4.3)	S. Batkovic (1.5)	S. Batkovic (2.6)
2013–14	L. Hodges (17.8)	L. Hodges (7.7)	A. Marino (3.4)	J. Foley (1.0)	C. Shegog (1.1)
2014–15	L. Hodges (16.5)	J. Screen (6.9)	J. Screen (3.7)	J. Foley (1.3)	K. Scheer (0.7)
2015–16	L. Mitchell (16.8)	M. Ruef (9.9)	L. Mitchell (4.5)	L. Mitchell (2.1)	K. Standish (0.8)
2016–17	L. Hodges (17.5)	L. Hodges (7.1)	S. Logic (5.4)	S. Logic (1.8)	C. Planeta (1.5)
2017–18	A. Bishop (15.7)	A. Bishop (9.2)	N. Seekamp (5.0)	N. Novosel (2.4)	R. Hamblin (1.0)
2018–19	N. Coffey (17.5)	K. Alexander (8.9)	N. Seekamp (6.0)	N. Seekamp (2.2)	N. Coffey (1.3)

== Players ==
=== Current roster ===
2025–26 Adelaide Lightning roster
Players
Coaches

Pos.	No.	Nat.	Name	Ht.
F/C	1	(New Zealand)	Tofaeono, Ella	1.90 m (6 ft 3 in)
F	2	(United States)	Sundell, Serena (I)	1.85 m (6 ft 1 in)
G	4	(Australia)	Loughridge, Dallas	1.67 m (5 ft 6 in)
G	6	(Australia)	Porter, Ruby (DP)	1.78 m (5 ft 10 in)
G/F	7	(Australia)	Talbot, Stephanie (C)	1.88 m (6 ft 2 in)
F	10	(Australia)	Freer, Maddy	1.80 m (5 ft 11 in)
F	11	(New Zealand)	Robati, Sharne	1.80 m (5 ft 11 in)
F	13	(Australia)	Freer, Jordyn (DP)	1.80 m (5 ft 11 in)
G	15	(Australia)	Fejo, Jasmine	1.77 m (5 ft 10 in)
F/C	20	(United States)	Feagin, Sania (I)	1.91 m (6 ft 3 in)
F	31	(New Zealand)	Strawbridge, Ashlee	1.85 m (6 ft 1 in)
G/F	41	(Australia)	Brazel, Tayla	1.82 m (6 ft 0 in)

Head coach

- (Australia) Kerryn Mitchell

Assistant coach(es)

- (Australia) Cherie Cordoba
- (Australia) Georgia Crouch

Legend

- (C) Team captain
- (DP) Development player
- (I) Import player
- Injured

- Roster
Updated: 26 October 2025

== Honour roll ==
WNBL Championships:	5 (1994, 1995, 1996, 1998, 2007/08)
WNBL Finals Appearances:	19 (1993, 1994, 1995, 1996, 1997, 1998, 1998/99, 1999/2000, 2000/01, 2001/02, 2002/03, 2003/04, 2004/05, 2005/06, 2006/07, 2007/08, 2008/09, 2011/12, 2012/13)
WNBL Grand Final appearances:	7 (1994, 1995, 1996, 1997, 1998, 1999/2000, 2007/08)
WNBL Most Valuable Players:	Rachael Sporn (1996, 1997), Suzy Batkovic (2012, 2013)
WNBL Grand Final MVPs:	Rachael Sporn (1994, 1995), Michelle Brogan (1996), Jo Hill (1998), Renae Camino (2008)
WNBL Coach of the Year:	Jan Stirling (1993), Peter Buckle (2012)
WNBL Rookie of the Year:	Kamala Lamshed (2002)
