= Southside Melbourne Flyers =

- Leagues: WNBL
- Founded: 1992
- History: Dandenong Rangers 1992–2019; Southside Flyers 2019–2025; Southside Melbourne Flyers 2025–present
- Arena: State Basketball Centre
- Capacity: 3,200
- Location: Wantirna South, Victoria, Australia
- Team colors: Aqua, Navy, White
- Main sponsor: Jayco
- General manager: Ian Coutts
- Head coach: Sam Mackinnon
- Ownership: Gerry Ryan
- Championships: 5 (2004, 2005, 2012, 2020, 2024)
- Website: wnbl.basketball/southside

The Southside Melbourne Flyers are an Australian professional basketball team based in Melbourne, Victoria. The Flyers compete in the Women's National Basketball League (WNBL) and play their home games at the State Basketball Centre. For sponsorship purposes, they are known as the Jayco Southside Melbourne Flyers.

The team was founded as the Dandenong Rangers in 1992. In 2019, the team was rebranded as the Southside Flyers. In 2025, the team rebranded to the Southside Melbourne Flyers.

== History ==
Dandenong Rangers

The Dandenong Rangers made their debut in the Women's National Basketball League (WNBL) in the 1992 season after Dandenong Basketball Association (DBA) obtained a WNBL license from the Nunawading Spectres. The Rangers went on to finish as runners-up in their first season, losing 58–54 in the grand final to the Perth Breakers. In the 2003–04 and 2004–05 seasons, the Rangers won back-to-back WNBL championships. They finished as runners-up in 2005–06. The team won their third championship in 2011–12 and finished runners-up again in 2016–17.

In July 2019, the Dandenong Rangers franchise was purchased from DBA by long-time sponsor Gerry Ryan and rebranded to the Southside Flyers. The team continued to play at Dandenong Stadium until moving to the State Basketball Centre in 2022.

In the 2019–20 WNBL season, the Flyers finished as runners-up. In the 2020 WNBL Hub season in Queensland, the Flyers won their first championship and fourth in franchise history. They finished runners-up again in 2022–23. The Flyers won their second WNBL championship and the franchise's fifth in the 2023–24 season. In the third and deciding game of the 2024 grand final series, the Flyers won 115–81 over the Perth Lynx, breaking the record for both the biggest winning margin in a grand final and the highest score.

Following the 2023–24 season, the Flyers sought to rebrand as the Melbourne Flyers following the transfer of the Melbourne Boomers' WNBL license to Geelong. The name change was initially accepted but later declined by the new league owners.

In July 2025, the team was rebranded as the Southside Melbourne Flyers.

== Season-by-season records ==
Season	Standings	Regular season			Finals	Head coach
Season	Standings	W	L	PCT	Finals	Head coach
Dandenong Rangers
1992	3rd	14	6	70.0	Won Semi Final (Canberra, 67–65); Won Preliminary Final (Melbourne, 67–57); Lost Grand Final (Perth, 54–58)	Alex Palazzolo
1993	4th	10	8	55.5	Lost Semi Final (Perth, 68–83)	Alex Palazzolo
1994	5th	10	8	55.5	Did not qualify	Alex Palazzolo
1995	8th	4	14	22.2	Did not qualify	Alex Palazzolo
1996	6th	9	9	50.0	Did not qualify	Steve Barr
1997	4th	9	9	50.0	Lost Qualifying Final (AIS, 66–76)	Steve Barr
1998	6th	7	5	58.3	Did not qualify	Steve Barr
1998–99	7th	6	15	28.5	Did not qualify	Mark Wright
1999–00	5th	11	10	52.3	Did not qualify	Mark Wright
2000–01	4th	15	6	71.4	Won Semi Final (Adelaide, 83–71); Lost Preliminary Final (Sydney, 72–78)	Mark Wright
2001–02	3rd	15	6	71.4	Lost Semi Final (Sydney, 85–98)	Mark Wright
2002–03	5th	11	10	52.3	Did not qualify	Gary Fox
2003–04	1st	17	4	80.9	Won Semi Final (Sydney, 85–68); Won Grand Final (Sydney, 63–53)	Gary Fox
2004–05	1st	19	2	90.4	Won Semi Final (Bulleen, 63–59); Won Grand Final (Sydney, 52–47)	Gary Fox
2005–06	1st	14	7	66.6	Won Semi Final (Adelaide, 75–70); Lost Grand Final (Canberra, 55–68)	Gary Fox
2006–07	4th	12	9	57.1	Lost Semi Final (Adelaide, 61–66)	Gary Fox
2007–08	4th	12	12	50.0	Won Semi Final (Canberra, 60–54); Lost Preliminary Final (Adelaide, 64–74)	Dale Waters
2008–09	7th	7	15	31.8	Did not qualify	Dale Waters
2009–10	7th	7	15	31.8	Did not qualify	Dale Waters / Dean Kinsman
2010–11	4th	12	10	54.5	Lost Elimination Final (Logan, 73–83)	Mark Wright
2011–12	3rd	14	8	63.4	Won Semi Final (Townsville, 77–66); Won Preliminary Final (Adelaide, 91–78); Won Grand Final (Bulleen, 94–70)	Mark Wright
2012–13	2nd	19	5	79.2	Lost Semi Final (Bendigo, 71–78); Lost Preliminary Final (Townsville, 64–78)	Mark Wright
2013–14	2nd	16	8	66.6	Lost Semi Final (Bendigo, 62–71); Lost Preliminary Final (Townsville, 71–74)	Mark Wright
2014–15	3rd	12	10	54.5	Lost Semi Final (Sydney, 80–89)	Mark Wright
2015–16	3rd	15	9	62.5	Lost Semi Final (South East Queensland, 82–86)	Larissa Anderson
2016–17	2nd	15	9	62.5	Won Semi Final (Perth, 2–1); Lost Grand Final (Sydney, 0–2)	Larissa Anderson
2017–18	7th	7	14	33.3	Did not qualify	Larissa Anderson
2018–19	5th	9	12	42.8	Did not qualify	Larissa Anderson
Southside Flyers
2019–20	1st	17	4	80.9	Won Semi Final (Adelaide, 2–0); Lost Grand Final (Canberra, 0–2)	Cheryl Chambers
2020	1st	11	2	84.6	Won Semi Final (Townsville, 106–93); Won Grand Final (Townsville, 99–82)	Cheryl Chambers
2021–22	7th	5	12	41.1	Did not qualify	Cheryl Chambers
2022–23	2nd	15	6	71.4	Won Semi Final (Melbourne, 2–1); Lost Grand Final (Townsville, 0–2)	Cheryl Chambers
2023–24	2nd	13	8	61.9	Won Semi Final (Melbourne, 2–1); Won Grand Final (Perth, 2–1)	Cheryl Chambers
Regular season		389	287	57.5	5 Minor Premierships	
Finals		18	20	47.3	5 WNBL Championships	

Source: WNBL

== Players ==
=== Current roster ===
2025–26 Southside Melbourne Flyers roster
Players
Coaches

Pos.	No.	Nat.	Name	Ht.
G	0	(Australia)	Bowyer, Indiah	1.78 m (5 ft 10 in)
F/C	3	(Australia)	George, Cayla (C)	1.92 m (6 ft 4 in)
G	6	(Australia)	Young, Nikita	1.78 m (5 ft 10 in)
G	9	(Australia)	Rocci, Maddison	1.68 m (5 ft 6 in)
G	10	(Australia)	Andrews, Haylee	1.78 m (5 ft 10 in)
F	11	(Australia)	Ernst, Carley	1.96 m (6 ft 5 in)
G	17	(Australia)	Rock, Imogen (DP)	1.78 m (5 ft 10 in)
G	20	(United States)	Marisa, Makenna (I)	1.80 m (5 ft 11 in)
G	22	(South Sudan)	Lok, Nyaduoth	1.80 m (5 ft 11 in)
G/F	29	(New Zealand)	Reed, Tera	1.83 m (6 ft 0 in)
F	32	(Australia)	Puoch, Manuela	1.87 m (6 ft 2 in)
F	34	(Australia)	Bourne, Isabelle	1.88 m (6 ft 2 in)
F	99	(United States)	Peters, Haley (I)	1.91 m (6 ft 3 in)

Head coach

- (Australia) Kristi Harrower

Assistant coach(es)

- (Australia) Matthew Clarke
- (Australia) Jo Wood

Legend

- (C) Team captain
- (DP) Development player
- (I) Import player
- Injured

- Roster
Updated: 26 October 2025

=== Former players ===
- Jessica Bibby
- Stephanie Blicavs
- Liz Cambage
- Aimie Clydesdale
- Alison Downie
- Jacinta Kennedy
- Kathleen MacLeod
- Anneli Maley
- Emily McInerny
- Leilani Mitchell
- Jenna O'Hea
- Laia Palau
- Kayla Pedersen
- Cappie Pondexter
- Stephanie Reid
- Mercedes Russell
- Penny Taylor
- Samantha Thornton
- Louella Tomlinson
- Carly Wilson
