= Women's National Basketball League =

Women's professional basketball league in Australia

Women's National Basketball League (WNBL)
- Current season, competition or edition: 2026–27 WNBL season
- WNBL Logo since 2025
- Formerly: Women's Interstate Basketball Conference (WIBC) (1981)
- Sport: Basketball
- Founded: 1981
- First season: 1981
- CEO: Justin Nelson
- No. of teams: 9
- Country: Australia
- Continent: FIBA Oceania (Oceania)
- Most recent champions: Townsville Fire (5th title)
- Most titles: Canberra Capitals (9 titles)
- Broadcasters: 9Go! ESPN
- Streaming partners: 9Now; Disney+ Kayo Sports
- Level on pyramid: 1
- Related competitions: Women's Basketball Conference
- Website: wnbl.com.au/

The Women's National Basketball League (WNBL) is a professional women's basketball league in Australia composed of nine teams. The league was founded in 1981 and is the women's counterpart to the National Basketball League (NBL).

== History ==
=== Founding of the WNBL ===
Following an exchange of letters with St Kilda coach Bill Palmer, West Adelaide Bearcat coach Ted Powell in August 1980 called a meeting at the Governor Hindmarsh Hotel in Adelaide. Attended by Powell, North Adelaide coach Kay McFarlane and Noarlunga coach Brendan Flynn, at this meeting it was decided to approach three Victorian teams (St Kilda, CYMS and Nunawading) with the idea of forming a home-and-away interstate competition.

The six teams' delegates then met and confirmed the new League at the Town and Country Motel in Sydney, during the 1980 Australian Club Championships. The meeting resolved to form a two-round competition between these teams, to be held in July and August of 1981. The basis for the idea was that many of the top sides in both states wanted a competition that would differ from their standard state leagues, as well as a suitable preparation for the Australian Club Championship, which was held on an annual basis for the top 24 teams in the country. With the formation of the Men's National League in 1979, it was identified that providing more opportunities for the best female players and clubs to play against each other more regularly would develop the women's game.

The competition was formed with the six teams to play a full home-and-away series between all teams, with three games on one weekend, to save costs. The NSW-based clubs of Bankstown and Sutherland paid their own way to travel to Melbourne and Adelaide, where they would play each team once, for double points. Thus, the WNBL was born. Reference. (Boti Nagy. High flyers: women's basketball in Australia 1990. Sun Books)

Also in 1981, the Australian Institute of Sport (AIS) was opened and the men's head coach, Dr Adrian Hurley (who went on to coach the Australian Boomers in the 1988 and 1992 Olympics), contacted the clubs and asked whether the AIS could also participate in the competition to commence later that year.

The nine teams in the inaugural season of the league were the AIS, Bankstown Bruins, Catholic Young Men's Society (CYMS), Melbourne Telstars, Noarlunga Tigers, North Adelaide Rockets, St Kilda Saints, Sutherland Sharks and West Adelaide Bearcats. On 19 June 1981, the competition commenced with the first game played in Adelaide, between the AIS and West Adelaide. The competition was called the Women's Interstate Basketball Conference, with each team paying $25 to be a part of the WIBC – giving a central fund of $200 to conduct the competition.

=== 1981–1985: early years ===
The inaugural winner was St Kilda, defeating the North Adelaide Rockets 77–58. St Kilda also went on to win the Victorian State Championship and the Australian Club Championship in Melbourne, defeating Bankstown Bruins in the final. St Kilda had three Australian representative players in Tracy Morris, Karen Ogden and Patricia Cockrem. Ogden would go on to become the national league's first two-time Most Valuable Player award winner, receiving the individual trophy in 1982 (the first season for which it was presented) and again in 1983.

In 1982, the competition expanded into another state, with the entry of a Brisbane team. The new revised program saw Victorian teams travelling to NSW and the ACT, NSW teams travelling to South Australia, and South Australian teams travelling to Victoria. The competition also changed its name to the more appropriate Women's Basketball League (WBL). St Kilda repeated its inaugural victory in 1982 with a grand final win over Bankstown. St Kilda's men's team also won the first two NBL titles, which showed the strength of St Kilda at that time.

In 1983, the, Nunawading Spectres led by Robyn Maher, easily defeated St Kilda in the grand final and went on to win nine WNBL titles in 12 years. During the 1983 Australian Club Championships, a workshop was held to discuss women's basketball and from that meeting came the decision to bring together a second tier of clubs to form the Women's Basketball Conference (WBC). There were now 20 women's teams playing in a home-and-away competition, which immediately improved the standard of women's basketball in Australia.

With the NBL riding a sudden wave of popularity, media interest in the women's league was also increasing. Most clubs were recognising the need to promote themselves and the image of the league. Pairing women's games with games of the men's NBL and South East Basketball League (a secondary interstate competition) in double-headers exposed the women's game to a wider spectator audience unfamiliar with the quality of women's basketball.

In 1985, the two women's competitions worked together to improve women's basketball, recognising the need to promote the competitions, as well as the individual clubs and athletes. Hobart won the second WBC title.

=== 1986–1989: league expansion and growth ===
When a Perth was admitted for the 1986 Women's Basketball Conference, the two women's leagues combined provided a truly national competition. The Australian Basketball Federation approved the WBL's application to be renamed the National Women's Basketball League and a new era was underway. 1986 was the first year that the WNBL played its first full home-and-away competition. In 1987, Perth sought and was granted a position in the national league, on the basis that Perth paid its own airfares in its first two years.

Following the success of Australian basketball at the 1988 Seoul Olympics, the WNBL appointed Lyn Palmer in the newly created full-time General Manager position. Palmer had just retired after a distinguished playing career with St Kilda, Nunawading and Coburg. Her husband Bill was General Manager of the men's NBL.

In 1989, the WNBL gained its first sponsorship from Pony, one of Australia's leading sporting apparel companies at the time for a reported $258,000. The ABC broadcast the finals series. There were 13 teams in the WNBL for the 1989 season. The Bankstown Bruins changed its name to the Sydney Bruins.

=== 1990s: continued growth ===
The next few years saw the league continue to grow, with Australia chosen to host the Women's World Championships in 1994.

In 1993, the WNBL teams agreed to contribute financially so that games could be televised on a weekly basis by the ABC. This coincided with the men's Sydney Kings taking over the ownership of the Sydney Bruins, renaming the women's team again, to the Sydney Flames. Coached by Carrie Graf, the Flames became one of Australia's most popular women's sporting teams.

In the early 1990s, the Perth Breakers started wearing the bodysuits that would become synonymous with the women's game in Australia. The Sydney Flames won the title in 1993, gaining back page coverage in the Sydney newspapers - a feat not envisaged in the early 1980s.

The 1990s were dominated by Sydney, Melbourne Tigers, Adelaide Lightning and Canberra. The AIS won its first title in the first summer season of 1998–99, led by one of the best basketballers in the world, Lauren Jackson.

In 1995, Leeanne Grantham (née Christie) became the Chief Executive of the WNBL. Throughout the mid-to-late 1990s, and into the early 2000s, the WNBL brand became the best known women's sport brand in Australia. It was also recognised as one of the top three leading women's basketball leagues in the world.

The ABC televised weekly WNBL games and broadcast the 1994 Women's World Championships, held in Australia. This provided women's basketball the profile required to secure significant sponsorship, enabling the League to continue to build on the WNBL brand.

=== 2000s ===
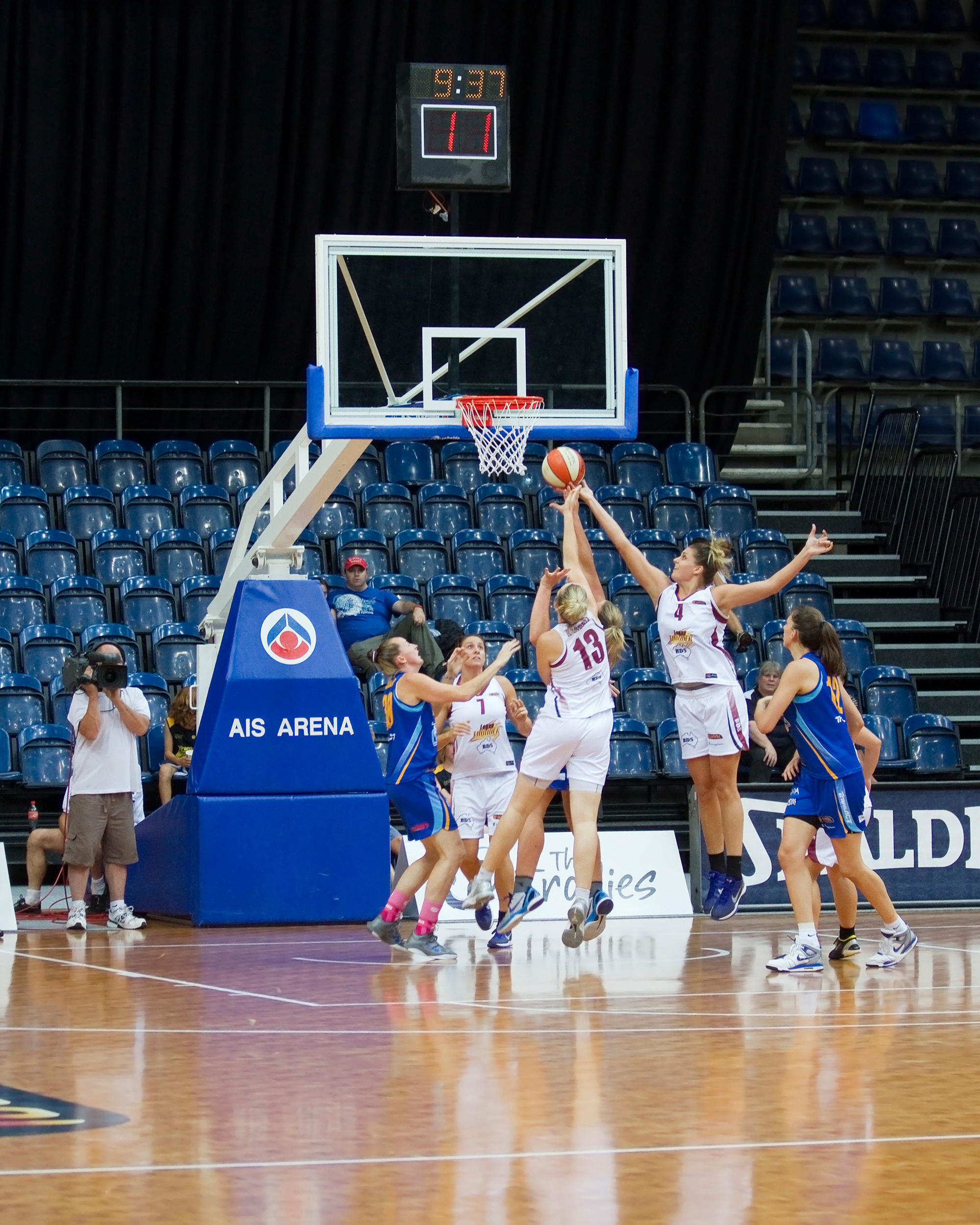
WNBL teams, the Logan Thunder in white and the University of Canberra Capitals in blue, battle for the ball in a game on 20 January 2012.

The ABC continued to televise the league, despite some difficulties in mid-2001, when the ABC contemplated changing its televising of sport. A successful partnership between the WNBL and Netball Australia subsequently saw both sports retained on the ABC. The ABC undertook to increase its coverage by showing Friday night games live on ABC digital television and replays on Saturday afternoons.

The WNBL was very stable with eight teams for a number of seasons, with Tasmania and Northern Territory not represented. In 2006, through the efforts of a strong community focus for women's basketball, Bendigo commenced discussions with Basketball Australia about entering a team for the 2007–08 season. At the same time, Basketball New Zealand had discussions with Basketball Australia about a team from New Zealand entering the next season.

In October 2006, the decision was made to welcome two new teams into the WNBL for the 2007–08 season in Bendigo Spirit and the Christchurch Sirens, who had a number of the New Zealand Tall Ferns players on their initial roster. One of the strategic objectives of the WNBL was to see a second team from the south of Queensland and after studying the feasibility, Logan Basketball Association was successful in being admitted to the 2008–09 season, with the Logan Thunder.

The February 2023 match between the Southside Flyers and the Sydney Flames drew the largest ever WNBL crowd of 7,681.

=== New league management ===
In June 2024, Basketball Australia sold the WNBL to a consortium co-managed by the National Basketball League (NBL). The NBL assumed operation of the WNBL from April 2025, following the 2024–25 WNBL season.

In May 2025, a new brand and logo were revealed by the WNBL.

== Clubs ==
=== Current clubs ===
Overview of WNBL teams
Club	City	Region/State	Arena (Note: Arenas shown with their non-commercial names where possible.)	Capacity	Head coach	Title(s)	Founded
Adelaide Lightning	Adelaide	South Australia	SA State Basketball Centre	1,600	(United States) Aja Parham-Ammar	5	1992
Bendigo Spirit	Bendigo	Victoria	Bendigo Stadium	4,000	(New Zealand) Kennedy Kereama	3	2007
Canberra Capitals	Canberra	Australian Capital Territory	AIS Arena	6,000	(Australia) Paul Goriss	9	1986
Geelong Venom (Note: Founded as the Bulleen Boomers (1984–2013), then rebranded to Melbourne Boomers (2013–2024). Club licence was sold and relocated to Geelong in 2024, rebranding as the Geelong Venom.)	Geelong	Victoria	Geelong Arena	2,000	(Australia) Cheryl Chambers	2	1984
Perth Lynx	Perth	Western Australia	Perth High Performance Centre	4,500	(Australia) Ryan Petrik	1	1988
Southside Melbourne Flyers (Note: Founded as the Dandenong Rangers (1992–2019), rebranded to Southside in 2019, and again to Southside Melbourne in 2025.)	Melbourne	Victoria	State Basketball Centre	3,200	(Australia) Sam Mackinnon	4	1992
Sydney Flames	Sydney	New South Wales	Sydney SuperDome	18,000	(Australia) Renae Garlepp	4	1981
Townsville Fire	Townsville	Queensland	Townsville Entertainment Centre	5,257	(Australia) Shannon Seebohm	4	2001
Tasmania Jewels (Note: In August 2025, the WNBL announced league expansion with a Tasmanian team to be managed by the Tasmania JackJumpers. It is planned to commence in the 2026–27 season. The WNBL also intends to add a tenth team commencing in the same season.)	Hobart	Tasmania	Derwent Entertainment Centre	4,340	(Canada) Claudia Brassard	0	2025

=== Former clubs ===
Overview of defunct WNBL clubs
Club	City/Town	Region/State/Territory	Country	WNBL season(s)
Adelaide City Comets	Adelaide	South Australia	Australia	1992
Australian Institute of Sport (AIS)	Canberra	Australian Capital Territory	Australia	1981–2012
Brisbane Blazers	Brisbane	Queensland	Australia	1982–1998
Christchurch Sirens	Christchurch	Canterbury	New Zealand	2007–2008
Coburg Cougars	Melbourne	Victoria	Australia	1983–1990
Geelong Cats	Geelong	Victoria	Australia	1986
Hobart Islanders	Hobart	Tasmania	Australia	1986–1996
Logan Thunder	Logan	Queensland	Australia	2008–2014
Melbourne Telstars	Melbourne	Victoria	Australia	1981
Melbourne Tigers	Melbourne	Victoria	Australia	1989–2001
Noarlunga City Tigers	Glenelg	South Australia	Australia	1981–1991
North Adelaide Rockets	Adelaide	South Australia	Australia	1981–1991
Nunawading Spectres	Melbourne	Victoria	Australia	1982–1991
South East Queensland Stars	Logan	Queensland	Australia	2015–2016
St. Kilda Saints	Melbourne	Victoria	Australia	1981–1985
Sutherland Sharks	Sydney	New South Wales	Australia	1981–1986
West Adelaide Bearcats	Adelaide	South Australia	Australia	1981–1992

== Season format ==
=== Regular season ===
The WNBL regular season typically begins in October and concludes in mid-to-late February. The WNBL runs a full home-and-away season, with Finals being played in best-of-three series. Teams play each other three times (21 games per team), meaning an 84-game regular season. The top four teams on the championship ladder move on to the WNBL Finals, usually taking place in March.

After April, teams hold training camps that allow the coaching staff to prepare the players for the next regular season and determine the roster with which they will begin the regular season. After training camp, a series of preseason exhibition games are held.

=== WNBL finals ===
The top four teams at the end of the regular season advances to the finals. The teams finishing in the first and second positions at the completion of the regular season receive home advantage in their three-game first-round match-ups against the teams finishing in fourth and third positions, respectively. The winners of these series advance to the grand final series, with home advantage again awarded to the highest remaining seed. The winner of the three-game grand final series is crowned as WNBL champion.

The WNBL finals
1980s

Season	Champions		Runners-up		Format	Result	Finals MVP
Season	Team	Coach	Team	Coach	Format	Result	Finals MVP
1981	St Kilda Saints		North Adelaide Rockets	Kay McFarlane	Single game	77–58	N/A
1982	St Kilda Saints		Bankstown Bruins	Robbie Cadee	Single game	63–56	N/A
1983	Nunawading Spectres	Tom Maher	St Kilda Saints		Single game	70–46	N/A
1984	Nunawading Spectres	Tom Maher	West Adelaide Bearcats	Ted Powell	Single game	78–65	N/A
1985	Coburg Cougars		Noarlunga Tigers	Jim Madigan	Single game	73–71	Karin Maar
1986	Nunawading Spectres		Australian Institute of Sport		Single game	62–51	Shelley Gorman
1987	Nunawading Spectres	Tom Maher	Coburg Cougars		Single game	67–59	Tracey Browning
1988	Nunawading Spectres	Tom Maher	North Adelaide Rockets	Kay McFarlane	Single game	71–43	Shelley Gorman
1989	Nunawading Spectres	Tom Maher	Hobart Islanders		Single game	80–69	Robyn Maher

1990s

Season	Champions		Runners-up		Format	Result	Finals MVP
Season	Team	Coach	Team	Coach	Format	Result	Finals MVP
1990	North Adelaide Rockets	Mark Molitor	Hobart Islanders		Single game	72–57	Donna Brown
1991	Hobart Islanders		Nunawading Spectres		Single game	67–64	Debbie Black
1992	Perth Breakers	Tom Maher	Dandenong Rangers	Alex Palazzolo	Single game	58–54	Tanya Fisher
1993	Sydney Flames	Carrie Graf	Perth Breakers	Guy Molloy	Single game	65–64	Annie Burgess
1994	Adelaide Lightning	Jan Stirling	Melbourne Tigers	Ray Tomlinson	Single game	84–77	Rachael Sporn
1995	Adelaide Lightning	Jan Stirling	Melbourne Tigers	Ray Tomlinson	Single game	50–43	Rachael Sporn
1996	Adelaide Lightning	Jan Stirling	Sydney Flames	Carrie Graf	Single game	80–65	Michelle Brogan
1997	Sydney Flames	Bill Tomlinson	Adelaide Lightning	Jan Stirling	Single game	61–56	Trisha Fallon
1998	Adelaide Lightning	Jan Stirling	Sydney Flames	Murray Wardle	Single game	67–56	Jo Hill
1998–99	Australian Institute of Sport	Phil Brown	Perth Breakers	Murray Treseder	Single game	88–79	Kristen Veal

2000s

Season	Champions		Runners-up		Format	Result	Finals MVP
Season	Team	Coach	Team	Coach	Format	Result	Finals MVP
1999–00	Canberra Capitals	Carrie Graf	Adelaide Lightning	Jan Stirling	Single game	67–50	Kristen Veal
2000–01	Sydney Panthers	Karen Dalton	Canberra Capitals	Carrie Graf	Single game	67–50	Annie Burgess
2001–02	Canberra Capitals	Carrie Graf	Sydney Flames	Karen Dalton	Single game	75–69	Lauren Jackson
2002–03	Canberra Capitals	Tom Maher	Sydney Flames	Karen Dalton	Single game	69–67	Lauren Jackson
2003–04	Dandenong Rangers	Gary Fox	Sydney Uni Flames	Karen Dalton	Single game	65–53	Emily McInerny
2004–05	Dandenong Rangers	Gary Fox	Sydney Uni Flames	Karen Dalton	Single game	52–47	Jacinta Hamilton
2005–06	Canberra Capitals	Carrie Graf	Dandenong Rangers	Gary Fox	Single game	68–55	Lauren Jackson
2006–07	Canberra Capitals	Carrie Graf	Sydney Uni Flames	Karen Dalton	Single game	73–59	Tracey Beatty
2007–08	Adelaide Lightning	Vicki Valk	Sydney Uni Flames	Karen Dalton	Single game	92–82	Renae Camino
2008–09	Canberra Capitals	Carrie Graf	Bulleen Boomers	Cheryl Chambers	Single game	61–58	Natalie Hurst

2010s

Season	Champions		Runners-up		Format	Result	Finals MVP
Season	Team	Coach	Team	Coach	Format	Result	Finals MVP
2009–10	Canberra Capitals	Carrie Graf	Bulleen Boomers	Tom Maher	Single game	75–70	Lauren Jackson
2010–11	Bulleen Boomers	Tom Maher	Canberra Capitals	Carrie Graf	Single game	103–78	Sharin Milner
2011–12	Dandenong Rangers	Mark Wright	Bulleen Boomers	Tom Maher	Single game	94–70	Kathleen MacLeod
2012–13	Bendigo Spirit	Bernie Harrower	Townsville Fire	Chris Lucas	Single game	71–57	Kelsey Griffin
2013–14	Bendigo Spirit	Bernie Harrower	Townsville Fire	Chris Lucas	Single game	94–83	Kelsey Griffin
2014–15	Townsville Fire	Chris Lucas	Bendigo Spirit	Bernie Harrower	Single game	75–65	Mia Newley
2015–16	Townsville Fire	Chris Lucas	Perth Lynx	Andy Stewart	Best-of-three	2–0	Micaela Cocks
2016–17	Sydney Uni Flames	Cheryl Chambers	Dandenong Rangers	Larissa Anderson	Best-of-three	2–0	Leilani Mitchell
2017–18	Townsville Fire	Claudia Brassard	Melbourne Boomers	Guy Molloy	Best-of-three	2–1	Suzy Batkovic
2018–19	Canberra Capitals	Paul Goriss	Adelaide Lightning	Chris Lucas	Best-of-three	2–1	Kelsey Griffin

2020s

Season	Champions		Runners-up		Format	Result	Finals MVP
Season	Team	Coach	Team	Coach	Format	Result	Finals MVP
2019–20	Canberra Capitals	Paul Goriss	Southside Flyers	Cheryl Chambers	Best-of-three	2–0	Olivia Époupa
2020	Southside Flyers	Cheryl Chambers	Townsville Fire	Shannon Seebohm	Single game	99–82	Leilani Mitchell
2021–22	Melbourne Boomers	Guy Molloy	Perth Lynx	Ryan Petrik	Best-of-three	2–1	Lindsay Allen
2022–23	Townsville Fire	Shannon Seebohm	Southside Flyers	Cheryl Chambers	Best-of-three	2–0	Tianna Hawkins
2023–24	Southside Flyers	Cheryl Chambers	Perth Lynx	Ryan Petrik	Best-of-three	2–1	Mercedes Russell
2024–25	Bendigo Spirit	Kennedy Kereama	Townsville Fire	Shannon Seebohm	Best-of-three	2–0	Sami Whitcomb
2025–26	Townsville Fire	Shannon Seebohm	Perth Lynx	Ryan Petrik	Best-of-three	2–0	Courtney Woods

== Players and coaches ==
The success of the WNBL over the years has been vital to the success of the Australian national team, the Opals. The WNBL has seen the development of famous Opals such as Robyn Maher, Michele Timms, Karen Dalton, Rachael Sporn, Shelley Sandie, Julie Nykiel, Jenny Whittle, Lauren Jackson and Penny Taylor, all of whom have represented Australia with distinction and have been key performers for their clubs, season after season.

=== Milestones ===
Milestone	Player	Team	Date	Information
Most career points	Rachael Sporn	Adelaide	1993–2004	5,823 points
Most career rebounds	Rachael Sporn	Adelaide	1993–2004	3,229 rebounds
Most career assists	Kristen Veal	AIS, Canberra, Sydney, Logan, Melbourne	1997–2016	1,617 assists
Most career blocks	Jenny Whittle	AIS, Brisbane, Perth, Bulleen, Canberra, Adelaide	1989–2009	672 blocks
Most career steals	Tully Bevilaqua	Perth, Canberra	1991–2011	722 steals
Most career three-points made	Belinda Snell	AIS, Sydney, Bendigo	1998–2019	605 three-points made
Most career games played	Kelly Wilson	AIS, Sydney, Townsville, Bendigo, Canberra	2002–present	395 games played

=== Awards ===
The Most Valuable Player Award is given to player deemed the most valuable for her team that season. The Grand Final Most Valuable Player Award is given to the player deemed the most valuable for her team in the finals. The Rookie of the Year Award is awarded to the most outstanding first-year player. The Defensive Player of the Year Award is awarded to the league's best defender. The Top Shooter of the Year Award is given to the player who averages the most points at the conclusion of the regular season. The Coach of the Year Award is awarded to the coach who makes the most positive difference to a team. Also named are the All-Star Five, who are the most valuable and best performing players of each season.

==== Most recent award winners (2025–26) ====
Award	Winner	Position	Team
Most Valuable Player	Isobel Borlase	Guard	Bendigo Spirit
Grand Final MVP	Courtney Woods	Guard	Townsville Fire
Defensive Player of the Year	Han Xu	Center	Perth Lynx
Sixth Woman of the Year	Lucy Olsen	Forward	Townsville Fire
Breakout Player of the Year	Dallas Loughridge	Guard	Adelaide Lightning
Coach of the Year	Kennedy Kereama	Coach	Bendigo Spirit
Leading Scorer Award	Isobel Borlase	Guard	Bendigo Spirit
Leading Rebounder Award	Anneli Maley	Forward	Perth Lynx
Golden Hands Award	Courtney Woods	Guard	Townsville Fire
Community Award	Nyaduoth Lok	Guard	Southside Melbourne Flyers
Fans MVP Award	Anneli Maley	Forward	Perth Lynx
Referee of the Year	Daniel Battye	Referee	
All-WNBL First Team	Alex Wilson	Guard	Perth Lynx
All-WNBL First Team	Courtney Woods	Guard	Townsville Fire
All-WNBL First Team	Isobel Borlase	Guard	Bendigo Spirit
All-WNBL First Team	Mackenzie Holmes	Forward	Geelong Venom
All-WNBL First Team	Anneli Maley	Forward	Perth Lynx
All-WNBL Second Team	Alex Ciabattoni	Guard	Perth Lynx
All-WNBL Second Team	Miela Sowah	Guard	Townsville Fire
All-WNBL Second Team	Kelsey Griffin	Forward	Bendigo Spirit
All-WNBL Second Team	Cayla George	Forward	Southside Melbourne Flyers
All-WNBL Second Team	Han Xu	Center	Perth Lynx

=== International influence ===
The WNBL has been a major stepping-stone for Australians to become noticed in European leagues and in the WNBA of the United States. It has also attracted a number of WNBA players from other English-speaking countries who supplement their WNBA salaries by playing in the WNBL. This is possible because the WNBA conducts its season in the northern hemisphere summer, which is the off-season for most basketball leagues throughout the world, including the WNBL. A number of international players have played in the WNBL, such as:

- Chelsea Aubry, Canada – long-time member and two-time champion with the Bendigo Spirit.
- Alana Beard, United States – with the Canberra Capitals.
- Micaela Cocks, New Zealand – three-time champion with the Townsville Fire.
- Shanavia Dowdell, United States – with the Townsville Fire.
- Olivia Époupa, France – champion with the Canberra Capitals.
- (New Zealand) Antonia Farnworth, United States – with the Perth Lynx.
- Ruth Hamblin, Canada – with the Perth Lynx and Adelaide Lightning.
- Laurie Koehn, United States – with the Melbourne Boomers.
- Betnijah Laney, United States – with the Perth Lynx, Bendigo Spirit and Dandenong Rangers.
- (United Kingdom) Jo Leedham, Great Britain – with the Bulleen Boomers.
- Angela Marino, New Zealand – with the Canberra Capitals, Perth Lynx and Adelaide Lightning.
- Kia Nurse, Canada – first international MVP and two-time champion with the Canberra Capitals.
- Krista Phillips, Canada – champion with the Dandenong Rangers.
- Cappie Pondexter, United States – with the Dandenong Rangers.
- Qiu Chen, China – with the Canberra Capitals.
- Julie Vanloo, Belgium – with the Townsville Fire.
- Amanda Zahui B., Sweden – with the Townsville Fire.

== Television ==
The ABC held the rights from the inaugural season in 1981 until cancelling its coverage in the 2014/15 season.

After two seasons without television coverage, Fox Sports picked up the rights for the 2017/18 season.

With the 2020 season, coverage returned to the screens of the ABC and also aired on Fox Sports and Kayo.

ESPN picked up the rights for the 2022/23 season with 9Now streaming every remaining game.

== See also ==
- Australian Basketball Association
- Basketball Australia
- Basketball in Australia
- National Basketball League
- Women's Basketball Conference
- Timeline of women's basketball
