= 2006 WNBL Finals =

Team	Coach	Wins
Canberra Capitals	Carrie Graf	1
Dandenong Rangers	Gary Fox	0
- Dates: 3 – 18 February 2006
- MVP: Lauren Jackson (Canberra)
- Preliminary final: Canberra def. Adelaide, 83–81

The 2006 WNBL Finals was the postseason tournament of the WNBL's 2005–06 season. The Dandenong Rangers were the two-time defending champions, but were defeated in the Grand Final by the Canberra Capitals, 68–55.

== Standings ==
#	WNBL Championship Ladder				
#	Team	W	L	PCT	GP
1	Dandenong Rangers	14	7	67.0	21
2	Adelaide Fellas	14	7	67.0	21
3	Canberra Capitals	14	7	67.0	21
4	Bulleen Boomers	13	8	62.0	21
5	Sydney Uni Flames	13	8	62.0	21
6	Townsville Fire	12	9	57.0	21
7	Perth Lynx	4	17	19.0	21
8	AIS	0	21	0.00	21

== Bracket ==
Semifinals
Dandenong Rangers	75
Adelaide Fellas	70
Canberra Capitals	67
Bulleen Boomers	62

Preliminary final
Adelaide Fellas	81
Canberra Capitals	83

Grand final
Dandenong Rangers	55
Canberra Capitals	68

== Semi-finals ==
=== (1) Dandenong Rangers vs. (2) Adelaide Fellas ===
4 February 2006

Report

Dandenong Rangers	75–70	Adelaide Fellas
Pts: Randall 13; Rebs: Hamilton 9 Asts: Wilson 3		Pts: Willey 22; Rebs: Phillips 8 Asts: Phillips 6

Dandenong Stadium, Dandenong, Victoria

=== (3) Canberra Capitals vs. (4) Bulleen Boomers ===
3 February 2006

Report

Canberra Capitals	67–62	Bulleen Boomers
Pts: Jackson 29; Rebs: Jackson 13; Asts: Abrams 3		Pts: Grima, Milner 12; Rebs: Grima 9 Asts: Milner 5

AIS Arena, Canberra, Australian Capital Territory

== Preliminary final ==
=== (2) Adelaide Fellas vs. (3) Canberra Capitals ===
11 February 2006

Report

Adelaide Fellas	81–83 (OT)	Canberra Capitals
Pts: Phillips 23; Rebs: Phillips 9 Asts: Woosnam 7		Pts: Jackson 33; Rebs: Jackson 11; Asts: Sharp 11

Distinctive Homes Dome, Adelaide, South Australia

== Grand Final ==
=== (1) Dandenong Rangers vs. (3) Canberra Capitals ===
18 February 2006

Report 1 Report 2

Dandenong Rangers	55–68	Canberra Capitals
Pts: Ryan, Wilson 17; Rebs: Hamilton 11; Asts: Richards 3		Pts: Jackson 24; Rebs: Jackson 11; Asts: Sharp 6

Dandenong Stadium, Dandenong, Victoria
Attendance: 2,200

=== Rosters ===
2005–06 Dandenong Rangers roster
Players
Coaches

Pos.	No.	Nat.	Name	Ht.
G	4	(Australia)	Ryan, Caitlin	1.75 m (5 ft 9 in)
G	5	(Australia)	Wilson, Carly (C)	1.80 m (5 ft 11 in)
G	7	(Australia)	MacLeod, Kathleen	1.75 m (5 ft 9 in)
G	8	(Australia)	Richards, Samantha	1.70 m (5 ft 7 in)
F	9	(Australia)	McInerny, Emily (C)	1.84 m (6 ft 0 in)
G/F	10	(Australia)	O'Hea, Jenna	1.87 m (6 ft 2 in)
G	11	(Australia)	Bibby, Jessica	1.69 m (5 ft 7 in)
G/F	12	(Australia)	Downie, Alison	1.81 m (5 ft 11 in)
F/C	14	(Australia)	Randall, Emma	1.88 m (6 ft 2 in)
F/C	15	(Australia)	Hamilton, Jacinta	1.87 m (6 ft 2 in)

Head coach

- (Australia) Gary Fox

Legend

- (C) Team captain
- (DP) Development player
- (I) Import player
- Injured

2005–06 Canberra Capitals roster
Players
Coaches

Pos.	No.	Nat.	Name	Ht.
G	5	(New Zealand)	Marino, Angela	1.63 m (5 ft 4 in)
G	7	(Australia)	Hurst, Natalie	1.63 m (5 ft 4 in)
F	8	(Australia)	Sharp, Eleanor	1.79 m (5 ft 10 in)
C	10	(Australia)	Whittle, Jenny	1.97 m (6 ft 6 in)
G	13	(Australia)	Abrams, Kellie	1.75 m (5 ft 9 in)
F	14	(Australia)	Cooper, Nerrida	1.86 m (6 ft 1 in)
F/C	15	(Australia)	Jackson, Lauren	1.96 m (6 ft 5 in)
C	25	(Australia)	Beatty, Tracey	2.02 m (6 ft 8 in)
F	32	(Australia)	Gwyther, Kylie	1.78 m (5 ft 10 in)
G	44	(Australia)	Bevilaqua, Tully	1.64 m (5 ft 5 in)

Head coach

- (Australia) Carrie Graf

Legend

- (C) Team captain
- (DP) Development player
- (I) Import player
- Injured
