= 2004 WNBL Finals =

Postseason tournament

Team	Coach	Wins
Dandenong Rangers	Gary Fox	1
Sydney Uni Flames	Karen Dalton	0
- Dates: 6 – 21 February 2004
- MVP: Emily McInerny (Dandenong)
- Preliminary final: Sydney def. Adelaide 65–61

The 2004 WNBL Finals was the postseason tournament of the WNBL's 2003–04 season. The Canberra Capitals were the two-time defending champions, but were defeated in the Semi-finals by Adelaide. The Dandenong Rangers won the Grand Final over the Sydney Uni Flames, 63–53, taking home their first ever WNBL title.

== Standings ==
#	WNBL Championship Ladder				
#	Team	W	L	PCT	GP
1	Dandenong Rangers	17	4	80.0	21
2	Sydney Uni Flames	13	8	62.0	21
3	Adelaide Lightning	13	8	62.0	21
4	Canberra Capitals	13	8	62.0	21
5	Townsville Fire	12	9	57.0	21
6	Bulleen Boomers	7	9	52.0	21
7	AIS	5	16	24.0	21
8	Perth Lynx	0	21	0.00	21

== Finals ==
Semifinals
Dandenong Rangers	85
Sydney Uni Flames	68
Adelaide Lightning	72
Canberra Capitals	63

Preliminary final
Sydney Uni Flames	65
Adelaide Lightning	61

Grand final
Dandenong Rangers	63
Sydney Uni Flames	53

== Semi-finals ==
=== (1) Dandenong Rangers vs. (2) Sydney Uni Flames ===
6 February 2004

Dandenong Rangers	85–68	Sydney Uni Flames
Scoring by quarter: 27–13, 24–16, 12–19, 22–20
Pts: Ryan 18; Rebs: Douglas 11; Asts: McInerny 5		Pts: Snell 36; Rebs: Hammonds, Snell 8 Asts: Hammonds, Snell 3

Dandenong Stadium, Melbourne, Victoria

=== (3) Adelaide Lightning vs. (4) Canberra Capitals ===
6 February 2004

Adelaide Lightning	72–63	Canberra Capitals
Scoring by quarter: 14–22, 16–9, 17–15, 25–17
Pts: Screen, Summerton 16; Rebs: Four players 7 Asts: Screen 4		Pts: Jackson 30; Rebs: Bailie, Jackson 9 Asts: Veal 7

Wayville Basketball Stadium, Adelaide, South Australia

== Preliminary final ==
=== (2) Sydney Uni Flames vs. (3) Adelaide Lightning ===
14 February 2004

Sydney Uni Flames	65–61	Adelaide Lightning
Scoring by quarter: 22–17, 17–12, 14–17, 12–15
Pts: Snell 21; Rebs: Snell 10; Asts: Musselwhite, Snell 2		Pts: Smith 13; Rebs: Brogan 12; Asts: Screen 5

Sydney Uni Sports & Aquatic Centre, Sydney, New South Wales

== Grand Final ==
=== (1) Dandenong Rangers vs. (2) Sydney Uni Flames ===
21 February 2004

Dandenong Rangers	63–53	Sydney Uni Flames
Scoring by quarter: 17–18, 13–16, 16–12, 17–7
Pts: Hamilton 18; Rebs: Douglas, Hamilton 11; Asts: Hamilton, McInerny 3		Pts: Snell 19; Rebs: Snell 8 Asts: Snell 3

Dandenong Stadium, Melbourne, Victoria
Attendance: 2,000

=== Rosters ===
2003–04 Dandenong Rangers roster
Players
Coaches

Pos.	No.	Nat.	Name	Ht.
G	4	(Australia)	Ryan, Caitlin	1.75 m (5 ft 9 in)
G	5	(Australia)	Wilson, Carly	1.80 m (5 ft 11 in)
G	6	(Australia)	Ranford, Deanne	1.75 m (5 ft 9 in)
F/C	7	(Australia)	Douglas, Allie (C)	1.89 m (6 ft 2 in)
G	8	(Australia)	Richards, Samantha	1.70 m (5 ft 7 in)
F	9	(Australia)	McInerny, Emily	1.84 m (6 ft 0 in)
C	10	(Australia)	Waixel, Demelza	1.88 m (6 ft 2 in)
G	11	(Australia)	Bibby, Jessica	1.69 m (5 ft 7 in)
G/F	12	(Australia)	Downie, Alison	1.81 m (5 ft 11 in)
F/C	15	(Australia)	Hamilton, Jacinta	1.87 m (6 ft 2 in)

Head coach

- (Australia) Gary Fox

Legend

- (C) Team captain
- (DP) Development player
- (I) Import player
- Injured

2003–04 Sydney Uni Flames roster
Players
Coaches

Pos.	No.	Nat.	Name	Ht.
G	5	(Australia)	Lindsay, Narelle	1.76 m (5 ft 9 in)
G	6	(Australia)	Wilson, Kelly	1.70 m (5 ft 7 in)
F/C	7	(Australia)	Hoare, Tammy	1.89 m (6 ft 2 in)
F/C	8	(Australia)	Hammonds, Shelley	1.88 m (6 ft 2 in)
G	9	(Australia)	Gilbert, Adrianne	1.72 m (5 ft 8 in)
G/F	10	(Australia)	Snell, Belinda	1.80 m (5 ft 11 in)
G	11	(Australia)	Hennessy, Briana	1.78 m (5 ft 10 in)
F/C	12	(Australia)	Randall, Emma	1.88 m (6 ft 2 in)
F	14	(New Zealand)	Cotton, Rebecca	1.85 m (6 ft 1 in)
G	15	(Australia)	Musselwhite, Michelle	1.78 m (5 ft 10 in)

Head coach

- (Australia) Karen Dalton

Legend

- (C) Team captain
- (DP) Development player
- (I) Import player
- Injured
