= 2005 WNBL Finals =

Team	Coach	Wins
Dandenong Rangers	Gary Fox	1
Sydney Uni Flames	Karen Dalton	0
- Dates: 4 – 19 February 2005
- MVP: Jacinta Hamilton (Dandenong)
- Preliminary final: Sydney def. Bulleen 79–71

The 2005 WNBL Finals was the postseason tournament of the WNBL's 2004–05 season. The Dandenong Rangers were the defending champions and they successfully defended their title, defeating the Sydney Uni Flames 52–47.

== Standings ==
#	WNBL Championship Ladder				
#	Team	W	L	PCT	GP
1	Dandenong Rangers	19	2	90.0	21
2	Bulleen Boomers	16	5	76.0	21
3	Sydney Uni Flames	16	5	76.0	21
4	Adelaide Lightning	13	8	62.0	21
5	Canberra Capitals	9	12	43.0	21
6	Townsville Fire	7	14	33.0	21
7	AIS	3	18	14.0	21
8	Perth Lynx	1	20	5.00	21

== Finals ==
Semifinals
Dandenong Rangers	63
Bulleen Boomers	59
Sydney Uni Flames	94
Adelaide Lightning	93

Preliminary final
Bulleen Boomers	71
Sydney Uni Flames	79

Grand final
Dandenong Rangers	52
Sydney Uni Flames	47

== Semi-finals ==
=== (1) Dandenong Rangers vs. (2) Bulleen Boomers ===
5 February 2005

Dandenong Rangers	63–59	Bulleen Boomers
Scoring by quarter: 25–10, 10–15, 16–19, 12–15
Pts: Richards 16; Rebs: McInerny 10; Asts: Wilson 3		Pts: Cavanagh, Grima 12; Rebs: Grima 12; Asts: Cavanagh 5

Dandenong Stadium, Melbourne, Victoria

=== (3) Sydney Uni Flames vs. (4) Adelaide Lightning ===
4 February 2005

Sydney Uni Flames	94–93 (OT)	Adelaide Lightning
Scoring by quarter: 26–19, 22–24, 18–19, 11–15, Overtime: 17–16
Pts: Snell 40; Rebs: Afeaki 8 Asts: Snell 5		Pts: Phillips 40; Rebs: Summerton 7 Asts: Phillips 5

Sydney Uni Sports & Aquatic Centre, Sydney, New South Wales

== Preliminary final ==
=== (2) Bulleen Boomers vs. (3) Sydney Uni Flames ===
12 February 2005

Bulleen Boomers	71–79	Sydney Uni Flames
Scoring by quarter: 28–17, 23–16, 9–19, 11–27
Pts: Davis 17; Rebs: Cavanagh, Grima 8 Asts: Hibbert 4		Pts: Snell 22; Rebs: Musselwhite 9 Asts: Five players 2

The Veneto Club, Melbourne, Victoria

== Grand Final ==
=== (1) Dandenong Rangers vs. (3) Sydney Uni Flames ===
19 February 2005

Dandenong Rangers	52–47	Sydney Uni Flames
Scoring by quarter: 13–15, 15–16, 11–11, 13–15
Pts: Hamilton 23; Rebs: McInerny 14; Asts: Hamilton, Wilson 2		Pts: Fallon 14; Rebs: Fallon 8 Asts: Hennessy 3

Dandenong Stadium, Melbourne, Victoria

=== Rosters ===
2004–05 Dandenong Rangers roster
Players
Coaches

Pos.	No.	Nat.	Name	Ht.
G	4	(Australia)	Ryan, Caitlin	1.75 m (5 ft 9 in)
G	5	(Australia)	Wilson, Carly	1.80 m (5 ft 11 in)
G	6	(Australia)	Ranford, Deanne	1.75 m (5 ft 9 in)
F/C	7	(Australia)	Douglas, Allie	1.89 m (6 ft 2 in)
G	8	(Australia)	Richards, Samantha	1.70 m (5 ft 7 in)
F	9	(Australia)	McInerny, Emily	1.84 m (6 ft 0 in)
G	11	(Australia)	Bibby, Jessica	1.69 m (5 ft 7 in)
G/F	12	(Australia)	Downie, Alison	1.81 m (5 ft 11 in)
F/C	14	(Australia)	Randall, Emma	1.88 m (6 ft 2 in)
F/C	15	(Australia)	Hamilton, Jacinta	1.87 m (6 ft 2 in)

Head coach

- (Australia) Gary Fox

Legend

- (C) Team captain
- (DP) Development player
- (I) Import player
- Injured

2004–05 Sydney Uni Flames roster
Players
Coaches

Pos.	No.	Nat.	Name	Ht.
G	4	(Australia)	Gilbert, Adrianne	1.72 m (5 ft 8 in)
G	5	(Australia)	Wilson, Kelly	1.70 m (5 ft 7 in)
	6	(Australia)	MacKinnon, Rebecca
F/C	7	(Australia)	Hoare, Tammy	1.89 m (6 ft 2 in)
G	8	(Australia)	Afeaki, Eva	1.84 m (6 ft 0 in)
F	9	(Australia)	Fallon, Trisha	1.90 m (6 ft 3 in)
G/F	10	(Australia)	Snell, Belinda (C)	1.80 m (5 ft 11 in)
G	11	(Australia)	Hennessy, Briana	1.78 m (5 ft 10 in)
	12	(Australia)	Fitzgerald, Lauren
G	15	(Australia)	Musselwhite, Michelle	1.78 m (5 ft 10 in)

Head coach

- (Australia) Karen Dalton

Legend

- (C) Team captain
- (DP) Development player
- (I) Import player
- Injured
