= List of WNBL champions =

The WNBL Grand Final is the championship series of the Women's National Basketball League.

== Champions ==
| Season | Champions | | Runners-Up | | Format | Result | Finals MVP | Ref. |
| Season | Team | Coach | Team | Coach | Format | Result | Finals MVP | Ref. |
|---|---|---|---|---|---|---|---|---|
| 1981 | St Kilda Saints | Bill Palmer | North Adelaide Rockets | Kay McFarlane | Single game | 77–58 | | |
| 1982 | St Kilda Saints (2) | Bill Palmer | Bankstown Bruins | Robbie Cadee | Single game | 63–56 | | |
| 1983 | Nunawading Spectres | Tom Maher | St Kilda Saints | Bill Palmer | Single game | 70–46 | | |
| 1984 | Nunawading Spectres (2) | Tom Maher | West Adelaide Bearcats | Ted Powell | Single game | 78–65 | | |
| 1985 | Coburg Cougars | Les Riddle | Noarlunga Tigers | Jim Madigan | Single game | 73–71 | Karin Maar | |
| 1986 | Nunawading Spectres (3) | Tom Maher | Australian Institute of Sport | Adrian Hurley | Single game | 62–51 | Shelley Gorman | |
| 1987 | Nunawading Spectres (4) | Tom Maher | Coburg Cougars | | Single game | 67–59 | Tracey Browning | |
| 1988 | Nunawading Spectres (5) | Tom Maher | North Adelaide Rockets | Kay McFarlane | Single game | 71–43 | Shelley Gorman (2) | |
| 1989 | Nunawading Spectres (6) | Tom Maher | Hobart Islanders | Danny Adams | Single game | 80–69 | Samantha Thornton | |
| 1990 | North Adelaide Rockets | Mark Molitor | Hobart Islanders | Danny Adams | Single game | 72–57 | Donna Brown | |
| 1991 | Hobart Islanders | Jim Pappas | Nunawading Spectres | Lori Chizik | Single game | 67–64 | Robyn Maher | |
| 1992 | Perth Breakers | Tom Maher | Dandenong Rangers | Alex Palazzolo | Single game | 58–54 | Tanya Fisher | |
| 1993 | Sydney Flames | Carrie Graf | Perth Breakers | Guy Molloy | Single game | 65–64 | Annie Burgess | |
| 1994 | Adelaide Lightning | Jan Stirling | Melbourne Tigers | Ray Tomlinson | Single game | 84–77 | Rachael Sporn | |
| 1995 | Adelaide Lightning (2) | Jan Stirling | Melbourne Tigers | Ray Tomlinson | Single game | 50–43 | Rachael Sporn (2) | |
| 1996 | Adelaide Lightning (3) | Jan Stirling | Sydney Flames | Carrie Graf | Single game | 80–65 | Michelle Brogan | |
| 1997 | Sydney Flames (2) | Bill Tomlinson | Adelaide Lightning | Jan Stirling | Single game | 61–56 | Trisha Fallon | |
| 1998 | Adelaide Lightning (4) | Jan Stirling | Sydney Flames | Murray Wardle | Single game | 67–56 | Jo Hill | |
| 1998–99 | Australian Institute of Sport | Phil Brown | Perth Breakers | Murray Treseder | Single game | 88–79 | Kristen Veal | |
| 1999–00 | Canberra Capitals | Carrie Graf | Adelaide Lightning | Jan Stirling | Single game | 67–50 | Kristen Veal (2) | |
| 2000–01 | Sydney Panthers (3) | Karen Dalton | Canberra Capitals | Carrie Graf | Single game | 67–50 | Annie Burgess (2) | |
| 2001–02 | Canberra Capitals (2) | Carrie Graf | Sydney Panthers | Karen Dalton | Single game | 75–69 | Lauren Jackson | |
| 2002–03 | Canberra Capitals (3) | Tom Maher | Sydney Panthers | Karen Dalton | Single game | 69–67 | Lauren Jackson (2) | |
| 2003–04 | Dandenong Rangers | Gary Fox | Sydney Uni Flames | Karen Dalton | Single game | 63–53 | Emily McInerny | |
| 2004–05 | Dandenong Rangers (2) | Gary Fox | Sydney Uni Flames | Karen Dalton | Single game | 52–47 | Jacinta Hamilton | |
| 2005–06 | Canberra Capitals (4) | Carrie Graf | Dandenong Rangers | Gary Fox | Single game | 68–55 | Lauren Jackson (3) | |
| 2006–07 | Canberra Capitals (5) | Carrie Graf | Sydney Uni Flames | Karen Dalton | Single game | 73–59 | Tracey Beatty | |
| 2007–08 | Adelaide Lightning (5) | Vicki Valk | Sydney Uni Flames | Karen Dalton | Single game | 92–82 | Renae Camino | |
| 2008–09 | Canberra Capitals (6) | Carrie Graf | Bulleen Boomers | Cheryl Chambers | Single game | 61–58 | Natalie Hurst | |
| 2009–10 | Canberra Capitals (7) | Carrie Graf | Bulleen Boomers | Tom Maher | Single game | 75–70 | Lauren Jackson (4) | |
| 2010–11 | Bulleen Boomers | Tom Maher | Canberra Capitals | Carrie Graf | Single game | 103–78 | Sharin Milner | |
| 2011–12 | Dandenong Rangers (3) | Mark Wright | Bulleen Boomers | Tom Maher | Single game | 94–70 | Kathleen MacLeod | |
| 2012–13 | Bendigo Spirit | Bernie Harrower | Townsville Fire | Chris Lucas | Single game | 71–57 | Kelsey Griffin | |
| 2013–14 | Bendigo Spirit (2) | Bernie Harrower | Townsville Fire | Chris Lucas | Single game | 94–83 | Kelsey Griffin (2) | |
| 2014–15 | Townsville Fire | Chris Lucas | Bendigo Spirit | Bernie Harrower | Single game | 75–65 | Mia Newley | |
| 2015–16 | Townsville Fire (2) | Chris Lucas | Perth Lynx | Andy Stewart | Best-of-three | 2–0 | Micaela Cocks | |
| 2016–17 | Sydney Uni Flames (4) | Cheryl Chambers | Dandenong Rangers | Larissa Anderson | Best-of-three | 2–0 | Leilani Mitchell | |
| 2017–18 | Townsville Fire (3) | Claudia Brassard | Melbourne Boomers | Guy Molloy | Best-of-three | 2–1 | Suzy Batkovic | |
| 2018–19 | Canberra Capitals (8) | Paul Goriss | Adelaide Lightning | Chris Lucas | Best-of-three | 2–1 | Kelsey Griffin (3) | |
| 2019–20 | Canberra Capitals (9) | Paul Goriss | Southside Flyers | Cheryl Chambers | Best-of-three | 2–0 | Olivia Époupa | |
| 2020 | Southside Flyers (4) | Cheryl Chambers | Townsville Fire | Shannon Seebohm | Single game | 99–82 | Leilani Mitchell (2) | |
| 2021–22 | Melbourne Boomers (2) | Guy Molloy | Perth Lynx | Ryan Petrik | Best-of-three | 2–1 | Lindsay Allen | |
| 2022–23 | Townsville Fire (4) | Shannon Seebohm | Southside Flyers | Cheryl Chambers | Best-of-three | 2–0 | Tianna Hawkins | |
| 2023–24 | Southside Flyers (5) | Cheryl Chambers | Perth Lynx | Ryan Petrik | Best-of-three | 2–1 | Mercedes Russell | |
| 2024–25 | Bendigo Spirit (3) | Kennedy Kereama | Townsville Fire | Shannon Seebohm | Best-of-three | 2–0 | Sami Whitcomb | |
| 2025–26 | Townsville Fire (5) | Shannon Seebohm | Perth Lynx | Ryan Petrik | Best-of-three | 2–0 | Courtney Woods | |

== Results by team ==
| Teams | Win | Loss | Total | Win % | Year(s) won | Year(s) lost |
|---|---|---|---|---|---|---|
| Canberra Capitals | 9 | 2 | 11 | .818 | 2000, 2002, 2003, 2006, 2007, 2009, 2010, 2019, 2020 | 2001, 2011 |
| Nunawading Spectres (Note: withdrew in 1991) | 6 | 1 | 7 | .857 | 1983, 1984, 1986, 1987, 1988, 1989 | 1991 |
| Adelaide Lightning | 5 | 3 | 8 | .625 | 1994, 1995, 1996, 1998, 2008 | 1997, 2000, 2019 |
| Southside Melbourne Flyers (Note: previously known as Dandenong Rangers (1992–2019)) | 5 | 4 | 9 | .556 | 2004, 2005, 2012, 2021, 2024 | 1992, 2006, 2017, 2020 |
| Townsville Fire | 5 | 4 | 9 | .556 | 2015, 2016, 2018, 2023, 2026 | 2013, 2014, 2021, 2025 |
| Sydney Flames (Note: previously known as Bankstown Bruins (1981–1990) and Sydney Panthers (2000–2002)) | 4 | 9 | 13 | .308 | 1993, 1997, 2001, 2017 | 1982, 1996, 1998, 2002, 2003, 2004, 2005, 2007, 2008 |
| Bendigo Spirit | 3 | 1 | 4 | .750 | 2013, 2014, 2025 | 2015 |
| St Kilda Saints (Note: dissolved in 1985) | 2 | 1 | 3 | .667 | 1981, 1982 | 1983 |
| Melbourne Boomers (Note: since rebranded as Geelong Venom) | 2 | 4 | 6 | .333 | 2011, 2022 | 2009, 2010, 2012, 2018 |
| Perth Lynx (Note: previously known as Perth Breakers (1988–2001) and West Coast Waves (2010–2015)) | 1 | 6 | 7 | .143 | 1992 | 1993, 1999, 2016, 2022, 2024, 2026 |
| North Adelaide Rockets (Note: withdrew in 1991) | 1 | 2 | 3 | .333 | 1990 | 1981, 1988 |
| Hobart Islanders (Note: dissolved in 1996) | 1 | 2 | 3 | .333 | 1991 | 1989, 1990 |
| Coburg Cougars (Note: dissolved in 1990) | 1 | 1 | 2 | .500 | 1985 | 1987 |
| Australian Institute of Sport (Note: withdrew in 2012) | 1 | 1 | 2 | .500 | 1999 | 1986 |
| Melbourne Tigers (Note: withdrew in 2001) | 0 | 2 | 2 | .500 | | 1994, 1995 |
| West Adelaide Bearcats (Note: withdrew in 1992) | 0 | 1 | 1 | .000 | | 1984 |
| Noarlunga Tigers (Note: withdrew in 1991) | 0 | 1 | 1 | .000 | | 1985 |

== See also ==
- NBL Grand Final
- AFL Women's Grand Final
- NRL Women's Grand Final
- W-League Grand Final
