= 2011 WNBL Finals =

Team	Coach	Wins
Bulleen Boomers	Tom Maher	1
Canberra Capitals	Carrie Graf	0
- Dates: 23 February – 13 March 2011
- MVP: Sharin Milner (Bulleen)
- Preliminary final: Canberra def. Bendigo, 83–78

The 2011 WNBL Finals was the postseason tournament of the WNBL's 2010–11 season. The Canberra Capitals were the two-time defending champions, but were defeated in the Grand Final by the Bulleen Boomers.

== Standings ==
#	WNBL Championship Ladder				
#	Team	W	L	PCT	GP
1	Bulleen Boomers	19	3	86.4	22
2	Canberra Capitals	18	4	81.8	22
3	Bendigo Spirit	15	7	68.2	22
4	Dandenong Rangers	12	10	54.5	22
5	Logan Thunder	12	10	54.5	22
6	Sydney Uni Flames	10	12	45.5	22
7	Townsville Fire	10	12	45.5	22
8	West Coast Waves	8	14	36.4	22
9	Adelaide Lightning	3	19	13.6	22
10	AIS	3	19	13.6	22

== Bracket ==
Elimination final
4	Dandenong Rangers	73
5	Logan Thunder	83

Semifinals
1	Bulleen Boomers	71
2	Canberra Capitals	67
3	Bendigo Spirit	74
5	Logan Thunder	53

Preliminary final
Canberra Capitals	83
Bendigo Spirit	78

Grand final
Bulleen Boomers	103
Canberra Capitals	78

== Elimination final ==
=== (4) Dandenong Rangers vs. (5) Logan Thunder ===
23 February 2011

Boxscore

Dandenong Rangers	73–83	Logan Thunder
Scoring by quarter: 23–17, 22–22, 15–22, 13–22
Pts: MacLeod 24; Rebs: Cumming 8 Asts: MacLeod 7		Pts: Camino 21; Rebs: Francis, Veal 11; Asts: Veal 8

Dandenong Stadium, Melbourne, Victoria

== Semi-finals ==
=== (1) Bulleen Boomers vs. (2) Canberra Capitals ===
26 February 2011

Boxscore

Bulleen Boomers	71–67	Canberra Capitals
Scoring by quarter: 12–15, 17–12, 19–19, 23–21
Pts: Cambage 29; Rebs: Zavecz 10; Asts: Cambage 2		Pts: Bibby 22; Rebs: Bowley 8 Asts: Hunt, Wilson 4

Melbourne Sports and Aquatic Centre, Melbourne, Victoria

=== (3) Bendigo Spirit vs. (5) Logan Thunder ===
27 February 2011

Boxscore

Bendigo Spirit	74–53	Logan Thunder
Scoring by quarter: 14–16, 17–14, 18–12, 25–11
Pts: Madgen 23; Rebs: Richards 13; Asts: Harrower 8		Pts: Camino 14; Rebs: Graham, Veal 5 Asts: Veal 4

Bendigo Stadium, Bendigo, Victoria

== Preliminary final ==
=== (2) Canberra Capitals vs. (3) Bendigo Spirit ===
5 March 2011

Boxscore

Canberra Capitals	83–78	Bendigo Spirit
Scoring by quarter: 26–18, 16-20, 19–18, 22–22
Pts: Wilson 21; Rebs: Tolo 9 Asts: Lacey 4		Pts: Harrower 26; Rebs: Richards 13; Asts: Harrower 3

AIS Arena, Canberra, Australian Capital Territory

== Grand Final ==
=== (1) Bulleen Boomers vs. (2) Canberra Capitals ===
13 March 2011

Boxscore

Bulleen Boomers	103–78	Canberra Capitals
Scoring by quarter: 29–15, 27–21, 23-19, 24–23
Pts: Milner 27; Rebs: Penaluna 14; Asts: Milner 5		Pts: Batkovic 28; Rebs: Cosier, Wilson 9 Asts: Batkovic, Hunt, Romeo 2

State Netball and Hockey Centre, Melbourne, Victoria

=== Rosters ===
2010–11 Bulleen Boomers roster
Players
Coaches

Pos.	No.	Nat.	Name	Ht.
G	4	(Australia)	Milner, Sharin (C)	1.87 m (6 ft 2 in)
F	5	(Australia)	Kunek, Alice	1.86 m (6 ft 1 in)
G	6	(Australia)	Glaubitz, Desiree (C)	1.77 m (5 ft 10 in)
C	7	(Australia)	Hammonds, Shelley	1.88 m (6 ft 2 in)
C	8	(Australia)	Cambage, Liz	2.03 m (6 ft 8 in)
G	9	(Australia)	Reid, Kylie	1.73 m (5 ft 8 in)
G/F	11	(Australia)	O'Hea, Jenna	1.87 m (6 ft 2 in)
F	12	(Australia)	Jarry, Rachel	1.85 m (6 ft 1 in)
G	14	(Australia)	Todhunter, Amelia	1.69 m (5 ft 7 in)
C	21	(Australia)	Penaluna, Elyse	1.93 m (6 ft 4 in)
G/F	33	(Australia)	Zavecz, Hanna	1.81 m (5 ft 11 in)
F	41	(Australia)	Crosswhite, Anna	1.86 m (6 ft 1 in)

Head coach

- (Australia) Tom Maher

Assistant coach(es)

- (Australia) Michele Timms
- (Australia) Gary Fox

Legend

- (C) Team captain
- (DP) Development player
- (I) Import player
- Injured

2010–11 Canberra Capitals roster
Players
Coaches

Pos.	No.	Nat.	Name	Ht.
G	4	(Australia)	Lacey, Alison	1.82 m (6 ft 0 in)
F	5	(Australia)	Dalgleish, Michaela	1.79 m (5 ft 10 in)
G	8	(Australia)	Wilson, Carly	1.89 m (6 ft 2 in)
C	9	(Australia)	Batkovic, Suzy	1.92 m (6 ft 4 in)
G	10	(Australia)	Hunt, Nicole	1.67 m (5 ft 6 in)
G	11	(Australia)	Bibby, Jessica (C)	1.69 m (5 ft 7 in)
F/C	12	(Australia)	Tolo, Marianna	1.96 m (6 ft 5 in)
G	14	(Australia)	Romeo, Nicole	1.66 m (5 ft 5 in)
F	20	(Australia)	Haynes, Rebecca	1.85 m (6 ft 1 in)
F	21	(Australia)	Bowley, Hannah	1.85 m (6 ft 1 in)
G	30	(Australia)	Cosier, Michelle	1.78 m (5 ft 10 in)
C	41	(Australia)	Beatty, Tracey	2.02 m (6 ft 8 in)

Head coach

- (Australia) Carrie Graf

Assistant coach(es)

- (Australia) Chris Lucas
- (Australia) Sandy Tomley

Legend

- (C) Team captain
- (DP) Development player
- (I) Import player
- Injured
