= 2008 WNBL Finals =

Postseason tournament of WNBL

Team	Coach	Wins
Adelaide Lightning	Vicki Valk	1
Sydney Uni Flames	Karen Dalton	0
- Dates: 23 February – 8 March 2008
- MVP: Renae Camino (Adelaide)
- Preliminary final: Adelaide def. Dandenong, 74–64

The 2008 WNBL Finals was the postseason tournament of the WNBL's 2007–08 season. The Canberra Capitals were the two-time defending champions but were defeated by Dandenong in the Semi-finals. The Adelaide Lightning won their fifth WNBL championship with a 92–82 win over the Sydney Uni Flames.

== Standings ==
#	WNBL Championship Ladder				
#	Team	W	L	PCT	GP
1	Adelaide Lightning	21	3	87.5	24
2	Sydney Uni Flames	17	7	70.83	24
3	Canberra Capitals	17	7	70.83	24
4	Dandenong Rangers	12	12	50	24
5	Bulleen Boomers	11	13	45.83	24
6	Townsville Fire	10	14	41.67	24
7	Bendigo Spirit	10	14	41.67	24
8	Christchurch Sirens	9	15	37.5	24
9	AIS	8	16	33.33	24
10	Perth Lynx	5	19	20.83	24

== Bracket ==
Semifinals
Adelaide Lightning	71
Sydney Uni Flames	90
Canberra Capitals	54
Dandenong Rangers	60

Preliminary final
Adelaide Lightning	74
Dandenong Rangers	64

Grand final
Sydney Uni Flames	82
Adelaide Lightning	92

== Semi-finals ==
=== (1) Adelaide Lightning vs. (2) Sydney Uni Flames ===
23 February 2008

Report

Adelaide Lightning	71–90	Sydney Uni Flames
Scoring by quarter: 12–17, 20–19, 21–31, 18–23
Pts: Camino 20; Rebs: Camino 10; Asts: Phillips 5		Pts: Porter, Poto 17; Rebs: Poto 8 Asts: Veal 7

Distinctive Homes Dome, Adelaide, South Australia

=== (3) Canberra Capitals vs. (4) Dandenong Rangers ===
22 February 2008

Report

Canberra Capitals	54–60	Dandenong Rangers
Scoring by quarter: 16–8, 17–10, 9–20, 12–22
Pts: Bishop 15; Rebs: Beatty 10; Asts: Bevilaqua 4		Pts: Ryan 18; Rebs: Brogan 7 Asts: Three tied 2

AIS Arena, Canberra, Australian Capital Territory

== Preliminary final ==
=== (1) Adelaide Lightning vs. (4) Dandenong Rangers ===
1 March 2008

Report

Adelaide Lightning	74–64	Dandenong Rangers
Scoring by quarter: 21–12, 21–19, 22–19, 10–14
Pts: Camino 24; Rebs: Woosnam 12; Asts: Woosnam 9		Pts: Brogan 18; Rebs: Brogan 11; Asts: McInerny 5

Distinctive Homes Dome, Adelaide, South Australia

== Grand Final ==
=== (1) Adelaide Lightning vs. (2) Sydney Uni Flames ===
8 March 2008

Report

Sydney Uni Flames	82–92	Adelaide Lightning
Scoring by quarter: 16–30, 19–10, 17–24, 30–28
Pts: Porter 23; Rebs: Musselwhite 9 Asts: Poto 6		Pts: Camino 32; Rebs: Camino, Whittle 9 Asts: Foley 6

Wollongong Entertainment Centre, Wollongong, New South Wales

=== Rosters ===
2007–08 Sydney Uni Flames roster
Players
Coaches

Pos.	No.	Nat.	Name	Ht.
F	4	(Australia)	Shiels, Kiera	1.90 m (6 ft 3 in)
F	5	(Australia)	Rice, Molly	1.81 m (5 ft 11 in)
G	6	(Australia)	Poto, Alicia	1.66 m (5 ft 5 in)
G	8	(Australia)	Afeaki, Eva	1.84 m (6 ft 0 in)
G	11	(Australia)	Dombkins, Mikaela	1.81 m (5 ft 11 in)
F	12	(Australia)	Smith, Melissa	1.87 m (6 ft 2 in)
C	13	(Australia)	Herrick, Rachel	1.92 m (6 ft 4 in)
F	14	(Australia)	Porter, Natalie (C)	1.85 m (6 ft 1 in)
G/F	15	(Australia)	Musselwhite, Michelle	1.76 m (5 ft 9 in)
G	23	(Australia)	Lorenzini, Erin	1.75 m (5 ft 9 in)
G	32	(Australia)	Veal, Kristen	1.76 m (5 ft 9 in)

Head coach

- (Australia) Karen Dalton

Legend

- (C) Team captain
- (DP) Development player
- (I) Import player
- Injured

2007–08 Adelaide Lightning roster
Players
Coaches

Pos.	No.	Nat.	Name	Ht.
G	5	(Australia)	Mahony, Jessica	1.69 m (5 ft 7 in)
G	6	(Australia)	King, Lauren	1.80 m (5 ft 11 in)
G/F	7	(Australia)	Duke, Rebecca	1.83 m (6 ft 0 in)
G	8	(Australia)	Camino, Renae	1.77 m (5 ft 10 in)
F	9	(Australia)	Woosnam, Samantha (C)	1.85 m (6 ft 1 in)
G	11	(New Zealand)	Marino, Angela	1.66 m (5 ft 5 in)
C	12	(Australia)	Whittle, Jenny	1.97 m (6 ft 6 in)
G	13	(Australia)	Phillips, Erin	1.73 m (5 ft 8 in)
F	21	(United States)	Gahan, Tracy	1.83 m (6 ft 0 in)
G	24	(Australia)	Foley, Jess	1.82 m (6 ft 0 in)

Head coach

- (Australia) Vicki Valk

Legend

- (C) Team captain
- (DP) Development player
- (I) Import player
- Injured
