= List of 2022–23 WNBL season transactions =

This is a list of transactions that have taken place during the off-season and the 2022–23 WNBL season.

== Front office movements ==
=== Head coach changes ===
Off-season

| Departure date | Team | Outgoing head coach | Reason for departure | Hire date | Incoming head coach | Last coaching position | Ref. |
|---|---|---|---|---|---|---|---|
| November 19, 2021 | Melbourne Boomers | (Australia) Guy Molloy | Contract expired | May 11 | (Australia) Chris Lucas | Adelaide Lightning head coach (2016–2022) | |
| April 5 | Bendigo Spirit | (Australia) Tracy York | Resigned | May 24 | (New Zealand) Kennedy Kereama | Canberra Capitals assistant coach (2021–2022) | |
| April 9 | Canberra Capitals | (Australia) Paul Goriss | Resigned | April 26 | (Australia) Kristen Veal | Centre for Excellence head coach (2018–2022) | |
| May 11 | Adelaide Lightning | (Australia) Chris Lucas | Contract expired | May 25 | (Australia) Natalie Hurst | Adelaide Lightning assistant coach (2020–2022) | |

== Player movement ==
=== Free agency ===
| Player | Date signed | Former team | New team | Ref |
|---|---|---|---|---|
| (Australia) Lauren Nicholson | March 22 | Townsville Fire | | |
| (Australia) Courtney Woods | April 29 | Townsville Fire | | |
| (New Zealand) Kalani Purcell | April 29 | Sydney Flames | | |
| (Australia) Keely Froling | April 30 | Sydney Flames | | |
| (Australia) Zitina Aokuso | May 2 | Townsville Fire | | |
| (Australia) Tahlia Tupaea | May 5 | Canberra Capitals | | |
| (United States) Brittany Smart | May 19 | Canberra Capitals | | |
| (Australia) Tiana Mangakahia | May 25 | Dynamo Moscow (RUS) | Sydney Flames | |
| (Australia) Emma Clarke | May 26 | Perth Lynx | Sydney Flames | |
| (Australia) Tayah Burrows | May 31 | Perth Lynx | | |
| (Australia) Lauren Scherf | June 3 | Perth Lynx | | |
| (Australia) Amy Atwell | June 4 | Hawaii Rainbow Wahine (USA) | Perth Lynx | |
| (Australia) Jessie Edwards | June 8 | Cockburn Cougars (WA) | Perth Lynx | |
| (Australia) Alex Bunton | June 9 | Canberra Capitals | | |
| (United States) Mikaela Ruef | June 9 | Canberra Capitals | Townsville Fire | |
| (Australia) Alexandra Sharp | June 10 | Perth Lynx | | |
| (Australia) Sami Whitcomb | June 11 | Perth Lynx | | |
| (United States) Hannah Sjerven | June 8 | South Dakota Coyotes (USA) | Sydney Flames | |
| (Australia) Lauren Mansfield | June 23 | Sydney Flames | Adelaide Lightning | |
| (Australia) Kelsey Griffin | June 24 | Canberra Capitals | Bendigo Spirit | |
| (Australia) Brooke Basham | June 28 | Adelaide Lightning | | |
| (United Kingdom) Karlie Samuelson | June 29 | CB Avenida (ESP) | Townsville Fire | |
| (Australia) Stephanie Talbot | July 1 | Adelaide Lightning | | |
| (United States) Jocelyn Willoughby | July 1 | New York Liberty (USA) | Sydney Flames | |
| (Australia) Morgan Yaeger | July 12 | Sydney Flames | Townsville Fire | |
| (Australia) Alex Wilson | July 15 | Bendigo Spirit | | |
| (Australia) Vanessa Panousis | July 15 | Sutherland Sharks (NSW) | Sydney Flames | |
| (Australia) Marena Whittle | July 19 | Adelaide Lightning | | |
| (Australia) Emilee Whittle-Harmon | July 21 | Southside Flyers | Canberra Capitals | |
| (United States) Tianna Hawkins | July 25 | Atlanta Dream (USA) | Townsville Fire | |
| (Australia) Mackenzie Clinch Hoycard | July 27 | Perth Lynx | | |
| (Australia) Rebecca Pizzey | July 28 | Sydney Flames | Canberra Capitals | |
| (Australia) Rachel Brewster | July 29 | Melbourne Boomers | | |
| (Australia) Louise Brown | July 29 | Melbourne Boomers | | |
| (Australia) Sophie Burrows | July 29 | Melbourne Boomers | | |
| (New Zealand) Penina Davidson | July 29 | Melbourne Boomers | | |
| (Australia) Cayla George | July 29 | Melbourne Boomers | | |
| (New Zealand) Lauryn Hippolite | July 29 | Melbourne Boomers | | |
| (Australia) Tess Madgen | July 29 | Melbourne Boomers | | |
| (United States) Tiffany Mitchell | July 29 | Melbourne Boomers | | |
| (Australia) Mia Murray | July 29 | Townsville Fire | Melbourne Boomers | |
| (Australia) Kristy Wallace | July 29 | Southside Flyers | Melbourne Boomers | |
| (Australia) Lily Scanlon | July 29 | Melbourne Boomers | | |
| (Australia) Emma Gandini | July 29 | Perth Lynx | | |
| (Australia) Chloe Bibby | August 2 | Maryland Terrapins (USA) | Perth Lynx | |
| (Australia) Indiah Bowyer | August 3 | Logan Thunder (QLD) | Sydney Flames | |
| (Australia) Lilly Rotunno | August 3 | Gold Coast Rollers (QLD) | Sydney Flames | |
| (United States) Robbi Ryan | August 4 | Grindavík (ISL) | Perth Lynx | |
| (Australia) Abby Cubillo | August 9 | Canberra Capitals | Adelaide Lightning | |
| (Australia) Rebecca Cole | August 16 | Southside Flyers | | |
| (Australia) Sara Blicavs | August 18 | Southside Flyers | | |
| (United States) Dekeiya Cohen | August 18 | Hapoel Rishon LeZion (ISR) | Canberra Capitals | |
| (Australia) Madelyn Allen | August 18 | Southern Districts Spartans (QLD) | Sydney Flames | |
| (Australia) Maddison Rocci | August 23 | Southside Flyers | | |
| (Australia) Lauren Jackson | August 24 | Albury Wodonga Bandits (NSW) | Southside Flyers | |
| (Australia) Abigail Wehrung | August 25 | Adelaide Lightning | Bendigo Spirit | |
| (Australia) Sherrie Calleia | August 25 | Sydney Flames | Canberra Capitals | |
| (Australia) Abby Bishop | August 26 | Southside Flyers | | |
| (New Zealand) Krystal Leger-Walker | August 26 | Washington State Cougars (USA) | Townsville Fire | |
| (Australia) Megan McKay | August 29 | Bendigo Spirit | | |
| (Australia) Aimie Rocci | August 29 | Southside Flyers | | |
| (United States) Rae Burrell | August 30 | Tennessee Lady Volunteers (USA) | Canberra Capitals | |
| (Australia) Alicia Froling | August 31 | Bendigo Spirit | | |
| (Australia) Tessa Lavey | September 5 | Bendigo Spirit | | |
| (Australia) Carley Ernst | September 7 | Melbourne Boomers | Southside Flyers | |
| (Australia) Nyadiew Puoch | September 8 | Centre of Excellence (ACT) | Southside Flyers | |
| (Australia) Dallas Loughridge | September 9 | Centre of Excellence (ACT) | Southside Flyers | |
| (Australia) Aliza Fabbro | September 16 | Townsville Fire | | |
| (Australia) Tia Hay | September 16 | Ipswich Force (QLD) | Townsville Fire | |
| (Australia) Nes'eya Parker-Williams | September 16 | Joondalup Wolves (WA) | Townsville Fire | |
| (Australia) Chloe Forster | September 20 | Warwick Senators (WA) | Perth Lynx | |
| (Australia) Desiree Kelley | September 20 | Willetton Tigers (WA) | Perth Lynx | |
| (Australia) Sophia Locandro | September 21 | UC Irvine Anteaters (USA) | Bendigo Spirit | |
| (Australia) Cassidy McLean | September 21 | Bendigo Spirit | | |
| (Australia) Isobel Borlase | September 27 | Adelaide Lightning | | |
| (Australia) Piper Dunlop | September 27 | Bendigo Spirit | | |
| (Australia) Kelly Wilson | September 30 | Canberra Capitals | Bendigo Spirit | |
| (Australia) Elizabeth Tonks | October 4 | Canberra Nationals (ACT) | Canberra Capitals | |
| (United States) Jacinta Monroe | October 5 | Flammes Carolo Basket (FRA) | Adelaide Lightning | |
| (Australia) Ruby Vlahov | October 11 | Perry Lakes Hawks (WA) | Perth Lynx | |
| (United States) Olivia Nelson-Ododa | October 12 | Los Angeles Sparks (USA) | Melbourne Boomers | |
| (Australia) Abby Solway | October 13 | Canberra Capitals | | |
| (Australia) Chloe Tugliach | October 13 | Canberra Nationals (ACT) | Perth Lynx | |
| (United States) Kayla Thornton | October 24 | Reyer Venezia (ITA) | Southside Flyers | |
| (Australia) Dyani Anaviev | October 26 | Bendigo Spirit | | |
| (Sweden) Ida Andersson | October 26 | Sunbury Jets (VIC) | Bendigo Spirit | |
| (Australia) Aneta Bandilovska | October 26 | Keilor Thunder (VIC) | Bendigo Spirit | |
| (Australia) Erin Condron | October 26 | Bendigo Braves (VIC) | Bendigo Spirit | |
| (Australia) Emma Mahady | October 26 | Sydney Flames | Bendigo Spirit | |
| (Australia) Ruby Porter | October 26 | Nebraska Cornhuskers (USA) | Bendigo Spirit | |
| (Australia) Micah Simpson | October 26 | Launceston Tornadoes (TAS) | Bendigo Spirit | |
| (Australia) Holly Griffiths | November 2 | Bulleen Boomers (VIC) | Southside Flyers | |
| (Australia) Lana Hollingsworth | November 2 | Santa Clara Broncos (USA) | Southside Flyers | |
| (Australia) Georgia Pineau | November 2 | Bendigo Spirit | Southside Flyers | |
| (Australia) Stephanie Bairstow | November 11 | South West Metro Pirates (QLD) | Sydney Flames | |
| (Australia) Miela Goodchild | November 20 | Duke Blue Devils (USA) | Melbourne Boomers | |
| (Australia) Monique Conti | November 28 | Casey Cavaliers (VIC) | Southside Flyers | |
| (United States) Nicole Monger | November 30 | CB Aridane (ESP) | Canberra Capitals | |
| (Australia) Kate Gaze | December 6 | Southside Flyers | Townsville Fire | |
| (United States) Alison Schwagmeyer-Belger | December 9 | ŽKK Crvena zvezda (SRB) | Canberra Capitals | |
| (Australia) Taylor Ortlepp | January 28 | Adelaide Lightning | Melbourne Boomers | |

=== Released ===
| Player | Date signed | Team | Reason | Ref |
|---|---|---|---|---|
| (Australia) Gemma Potter | November 5 | Canberra Capitals | ACL injury | |
| (Australia) Lily Scanlon | November 9 | Melbourne Boomers | Achilles injury | |
| (New Zealand) Kalani Purcell | November 11 | Sydney Flames | Personal reasons | |
| (United States) Dekeiya Cohen | November 28 | Canberra Capitals | Personal decision | |
| (Australia) Dallas Loughridge | November 28 | Southside Flyers | Knee injury | |
| (Australia) Stephanie Bairstow | December 1 | Sydney Flames | Coach's decision | |
| (United States) Kierstan Bell | December 29 | Adelaide Lightning | Personal decision | |

== Outgoing movement ==
=== Going overseas ===
| Player | Date signed | Former team | New team | Ref |
|---|---|---|---|---|
| (Australia) Katie Deeble | November 11 | Sydney Flames | Wake Forest Demon Deacons (USA) | |
| (Australia) Tess Heal | November 21 | Melbourne Boomers | Santa Clara Broncos (USA) | |
| (United States) Sug Sutton | April 2 | Townsville Fire | Poznań (POL) | |
| (Australia) Ezi Magbegor | May 7 | Melbourne Boomers | Sopron Basket (HUN) | |
| (United States) Brittney Sykes | May 7 | Canberra Capitals | Sopron Basket (HUN) | |
| (United States) Marina Mabrey | June 10 | Perth Lynx | PF Schio (ITA) | |
| (Australia) Darcee Garbin | June 12 | Perth Lynx | DVTK Miskolc (HUN) | |
| (Australia) Alanna Smith | June 21 | Adelaide Lightning | Gorzów Wielkopolski (POL) | |
| (Australia) Madeleine Garrick | June 22 | Bendigo Spirit | Geas Basket (ITA) | |
| (United States) Jackie Young | July 14 | Perth Lynx | Hatayspor (TUR) | |
| (United States) Kylee Shook | July 22 | Adelaide Lightning | Olympiacos (GRE) | |
| (United States) Kiana Williams | July 28 | Adelaide Lightning | Cekk Cegléd (HUN) | |
| (United States) Monique Billings | September 1 | Townsville Fire | Al-Fuheis (JOR) | |
| (Australia) Chyra Evans | August 11 | Sydney Flames | Michigan Wolverines (USA) | |
| (United States) Lindsay Allen | August 23 | Melbourne Boomers | Gorzów Wielkopolski (POL) | |

=== Retirement ===
| Name | Date | Team(s) played (years) | Notes | Ref. |
|---|---|---|---|---|
| (Australia) Jenna O'Hea | March 8 | Australian Institute of Sport (2003–2005); Dandenong Rangers (2005–2007, 2011–2014); Bendigo Spirit (2007–08); Bulleen / Melbourne Boomers (2009–2011, 2017–2019); Southside Flyers (2019–2022) | 3x WNBL Champion (2011, 2012, 2020); 6x All-WNBL First Team (2010–2014, 2020); Also played overseas in the WNBA & France. Represented Australia national team over 11 years. | |
| (Australia) Izzy Wright | May 25 | Logan Thunder (2012–13); Perth Lynx (2015–16); Melbourne Boomers (2020–2022) | WNBL Champion (2022) | |

== See also ==
- List of 2022–23 WNBL team rosters
