= 2012 WNBL Finals =

Team	Coach	Wins
Dandenong Rangers	Mark Wright	1
Bulleen Boomers	Tom Maher	0
- Dates: 22 February – 11 March 2012
- MVP: Kathleen MacLeod (Dandenong)
- Preliminary final: Dandenong def. Adelaide, 91–78

The 2012 WNBL Finals was the postseason tournament of the WNBL's 2011–12 season. The Bulleen Boomers were the defending champions but were defeated in the Grand Final by the Dandenong Rangers.

== Standings ==
#	WNBL Championship Ladder				
#	Team	W	L	PCT	GP
1	Adelaide Lightning	18	4	81.8	22
2	Bulleen Boomers	15	7	68.2	22
3	Dandenong Rangers	14	8	63.4	22
4	Townsville Fire	13	9	59.0	22
5	Sydney Uni Flames	13	9	59.0	22
6	Bendigo Spirit	12	10	54.5	22
7	Logan Thunder	12	10	54.5	22
8	Canberra Capitals	9	13	40.9	22
9	West Coast Waves	2	20	9.0	22
10	AIS	2	20	9.0	22

== Bracket ==
Elimination Final
4	Townsville Fire	85
5	Sydney Uni Flames	78

Semifinals
1	Adelaide Lightning	70
2	Bulleen Boomers	73
3	Dandenong Rangers	77
4	Townsville Fire	66

Preliminary final
Adelaide Lightning	78
Dandenong Rangers	91

Grand final
Bulleen Boomers	70
Dandenong Rangers	94

== Elimination final ==
=== (4) Townsville Fire vs. (5) Sydney Uni Flames ===
22 February 2012

Boxscore

Townsville Fire	85–78	Sydney Uni Flames
Scoring by quarter: 30–22, 23–25, 16–20, 16–11
Pts: Foley 21; Rebs: Foley 9 Asts: Flanagan 9		Pts: Denson 18; Rebs: King, Snell 8 Asts: Poto 5

Townsville RSL Stadium, Townsville, Queensland

== Semi-finals ==
=== (1) Adelaide Lightning vs. (2) Bulleen Boomers ===
25 February 2012

Boxscore

Adelaide Lightning	71–73	Bulleen Boomers
Scoring by quarter: 19–25, 11–13, 20–17, 21–18
Pts: Bishop 23; Rebs: Batkovic 7 Asts: Batkovic, Bishop, Lewis 3		Pts: Cambage 29; Rebs: Jarry 10; Asts: Leedham 3

Adelaide Arena, Adelaide, South Australia

=== (3) Dandenong Rangers vs. (4) Townsville Fire ===
26 February 2012

Boxscore

Dandenong Rangers	77–66	Townsville Fire
Scoring by quarter: 19–16, 15–17, 18–25, 25–8
Pts: O'Hea 24; Rebs: Phillips 14; Asts: MacLeod 8		Pts: Payne 18; Rebs: Dowdell 9 Asts: Cocks 4

Dandenong Stadium, Melbourne, Victoria

== Preliminary final ==
=== (1) Adelaide Lightning vs. (3) Dandenong Rangers ===
4 March 2012

Boxscore

Adelaide Lightning	78–91	Dandenong Rangers
Scoring by quarter: 22–20, 19–15, 19–23, 18–33
Pts: Batkovic 34; Rebs: Screen 8 Asts: Batkovic, Bishop 4		Pts: O'Hea 28; Rebs: Phillips 14; Asts: O'Hea 8

Adelaide Arena, Adelaide, South Australia

== Grand Final ==
=== (2) Bulleen Boomers vs. (3) Dandenong Rangers ===
11 March 2012

Bulleen Boomers	70–94	Dandenong Rangers
Pts: Cambage 22; Rebs: Cambage 14		Pts: MacLeod 22; Rebs: Phillips, O'Hea 7 Asts: MacLeod 9

State Netball and Hockey Centre, Melbourne, Victoria
Attendance: 3,500

=== Rosters ===
2011–12 Bulleen Boomers roster
Players
Coaches

Pos.	No.	Nat.	Name	Ht.
G	4	(Australia)	Todhunter, Amelia	1.69 m (5 ft 7 in)
G	6	(Australia)	Richards, Samantha	1.70 m (5 ft 7 in)
C	8	(Australia)	Cambage, Liz	2.03 m (6 ft 8 in)
G	9	(Australia)	Harrington, Kerryn	1.73 m (5 ft 8 in)
F	10	(Australia)	Kunek, Alice	1.86 m (6 ft 1 in)
F	11	(Australia)	Roberts, Tayla	1.91 m (6 ft 3 in)
F	12	(Australia)	Jarry, Rachel	1.85 m (6 ft 1 in)
G	13	(Australia)	Perera, Chantella	1.74 m (5 ft 9 in)
F	15	(Australia)	Pearce, Lauren	1.81 m (5 ft 11 in)
G/F	23	(United Kingdom)	Leedham, Johannah	1.80 m (5 ft 11 in)
G/F	33	(Australia)	Probst, Faith	1.86 m (6 ft 1 in)

Head coach

- (Australia) Tom Maher

Assistant coach(es)

- (Australia) Michele Timms

Legend

- (C) Team captain
- (DP) Development player
- (I) Import player
- Injured

2011–12 Dandenong Rangers roster
Players
Coaches

Pos.	No.	Nat.	Name	Ht.
G/F	4	(Australia)	O'Hea, Jenna	1.87 m (6 ft 2 in)
G	5	(Australia)	Clydesdale, Aimie	1.78 m (5 ft 10 in)
G/F	6	(Australia)	Woosnam, Sam	1.85 m (6 ft 1 in)
F	7	(Australia)	Cunningham, Tegan	1.86 m (6 ft 1 in)
G	8	(Australia)	Cumming, Stephanie	1.78 m (5 ft 10 in)
F	9	(Australia)	Terdich, Hope	1.92 m (6 ft 4 in)
G	11	(Australia)	Papavs, Clare	1.80 m (5 ft 11 in)
F	12	(Australia)	Downie, Alison	1.82 m (6 ft 0 in)
C	22	(Australia)	Tomlinson, Louella	1.93 m (6 ft 4 in)
C	25	(Canada)	Phillips, Krista	1.98 m (6 ft 6 in)
G	44	(Australia)	MacLeod, Kathleen (C)	1.68 m (5 ft 6 in)
F	51	(United States)	Wilkins, Brittany	1.91 m (6 ft 3 in)

Head coach

- (Australia) Mark Wright

Assistant coach(es)

- (Australia) Andrew Sherwell

Legend

- (C) Team captain
- (DP) Development player
- (I) Import player
- Injured
