= Sue Geh =

Australian basketball player

Personal information
- Born: 10 September 1959 Canberra, Australia
- Died: 14 September 1998 (aged 39) Canberra, Australia
- Height: 205 cm (6 ft 9 in)

Susanna Geh (10 September 1959 – 14 September 1998) was an Australian basketball player.

== Early life ==
Geh was educated in Canberra at Forrest Primary School, Alfred Deakin High School and Phillip College (1976). After leaving school, she worked at the Department of Defence. Her parents were Karl and Inge and she had an older sister, Gaby.

== Sporting career ==
Geh's basketball career started in 1969 when her older sister Gaby informed coach Joe Cosgrove that her younger sister was very tall. Geh began playing with the Weston Creek Woden basketball club. In 1980, Geh was awarded a scholarship with the University of Alabama at Birmingham. She was not allowed to fulfill the scholarship after a medical examination showed that she had a slight heart murmur. Between 1983 and 1984, Geh held a basketball scholarship at the Australian Institute of Sport.

Geh played for the national team between 1983 and 1986, competing at the 1984 Olympic Games in Los Angeles. At the Games, she played a prominent role in Australia defeating Yugoslavia 62–59 in the playoff for fifth and sixth place. In the second half, she shot 10 points, had four assists, blocked three shots and had three rebounds. Geh also represented Australia at the 1986 World Championship held in the Soviet Union. At 205 centimetres (6 ft 8 1/2 in), Geh was Australia's tallest ever international female basketball player, being two centimetres taller than Liz Cambage who played with the Opals until 2021.

Jerry Lee, one of her Canberra Capitals coaches commented that "Suzie was a woman of outstanding character on and off the court. When she first began playing at the higher level she copped plenty because the referees didn't know what was going on with the players who kept mugging her under the basket. She was constantly frustrated but always kept her cool, particularly in tough situations. She never berated other players, she used what she had well, she shot a good percentage, and was a very good defensive players and played her games, always with decorum".

In the domestic Women's National Basketball League (WNBL), Geh played for the Canberra Capitals in 1986 and 1987. At age 26, a hereditary heart condition forced Geh into early retirement following her participation in the 1986 World Championships in Moscow. Geh died in Canberra Hospital on 14 September 1998 from heart failure, aged 39.

== Legacy ==
- Sue Geh Circuit in the Canberra suburb of Nicholls is named after her.
- Basketball Canberra runs the Sue Geh Cup, a competition for primary-school girls.
- In November 2015, Geh was inducted into the ACT Sport Hall of Fame.
