= Liz Cambage =

Australian basketball player (born 1991)

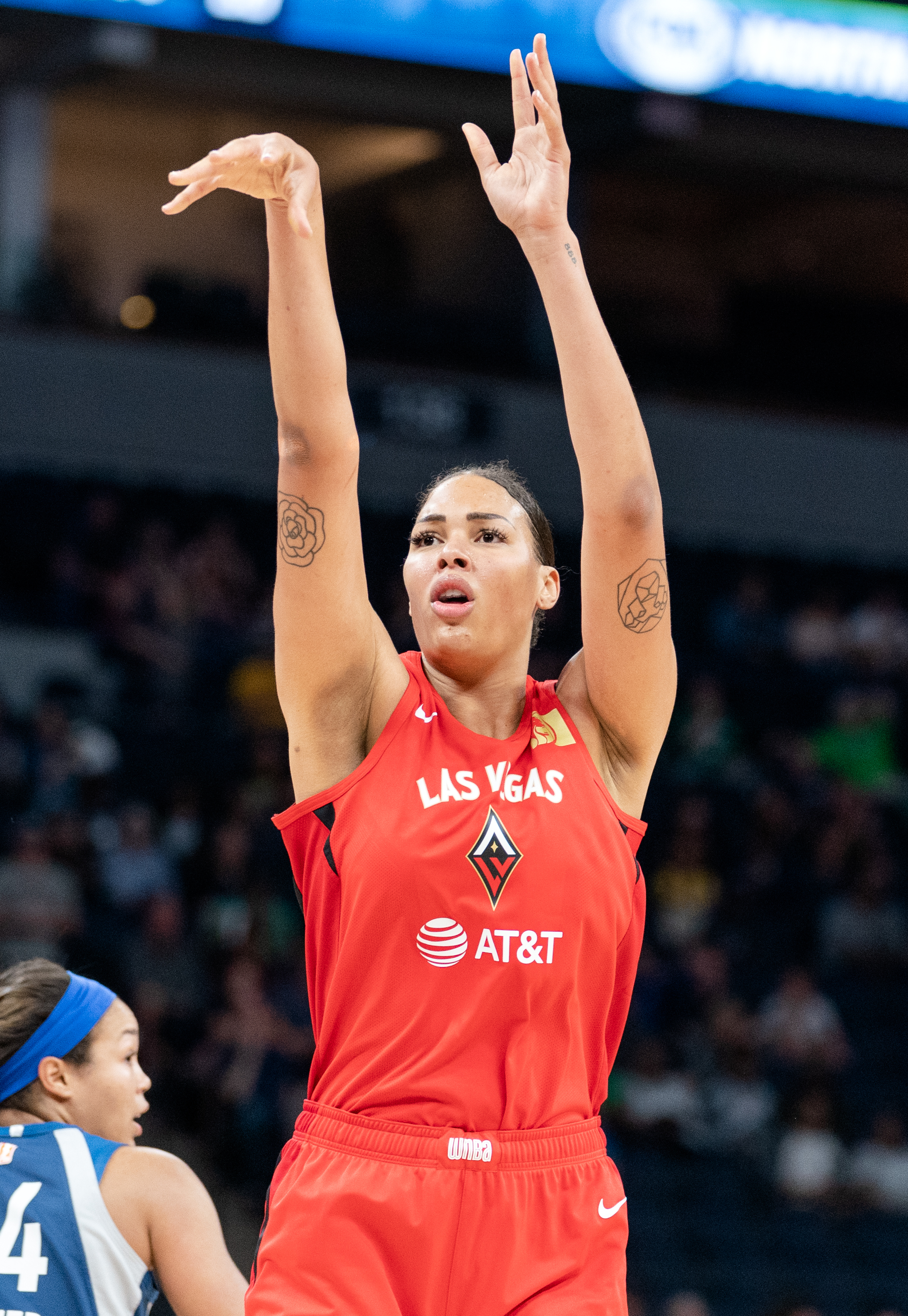
- Cambage with the Las Vegas Aces in 2019

No. 18 – Sichuan Yuanda
- Position: Center
- League: Women's Chinese Basketball Association

Personal information
- Born: 18 August 1991 (age 35) London, England
- Listed height: 6 ft 9 in (2.06 m)
- Listed weight: 216 lb (98 kg)

Career information
- High school: Padua College (Mornington, Victoria)
- WNBA draft: 2011: 1st round, 2nd overall pick
- Drafted by: Tulsa Shock
- Playing career: 2007–present

Career history
- 2007: Dandenong Rangers
- 2007–2008: Australian Institute of Sport
- 2009–2012: Bulleen Boomers
- 2011: Tulsa Shock
- 2012–2013: Zhejiang Chouzhou
- 2013: Tulsa Shock
- 2013–2014: Beijing Great Wall
- 2015–2016: Shanghai Swordfish
- 2017–2018: Melbourne Boomers
- 2018: Dallas Wings
- 2018–2019: Shanxi Flame
- 2019, 2021: Las Vegas Aces
- 2020: Southside Flyers
- 2022: Los Angeles Sparks
- 2023: Maccabi Bnot Ashdod
- 2024–present: Sichuan Yuanda

Career highlights
- 2× WCBA champion (2024, 2026); WNBA Peak Performer (2018); 4× WNBA All-Star (2011, 2018, 2019, 2021); All-WNBA First Team (2018); All-WNBA Second Team (2019); WNBA scoring leader (2018); WNBA All-Rookie Team (2011); 2× WNBL Champion (2011, 2020); WNBL MVP (2011); 4× All-WNBL First Team (2010, 2011, 2018, 2020)
- Stats at WNBA.com
- Stats at Basketball Reference

Elizabeth Folake Cambage (/kæmˈbeɪʒ/ kam-BAYZH; born 18 August 1991) is an Australian professional basketball player for the Sichuan Yuanda of the Women's Chinese Basketball Association. She won the Women's National Basketball League in 2011 and 2014 and the Women's Chinese Basketball Association championship in 2024. Cambage currently shares the WNBA single-game scoring record with Marina Mabrey and A'ja Wilson, with her 53-point performance against the New York Liberty on 17 July 2018.

She played for the Australia national team, the Opals, between 2009 and 2021, winning a gold medal in the 2018 Commonwealth Games, silver in the 2018 World Cup, and bronze in the 2012 Olympics.

== Early life ==
Cambage was born on 18 August 1991 in London to a Nigerian father and an Australian mother. Her parents separated when Cambage was three months old and she moved to Australia with her mother. First settling in Eden in New South Wales, the family moved to Melbourne when Cambage was 10 years of age and later the Mornington Peninsula.

Cambage is 2.06 metres (6 ft 9 in) tall. She was teased about her height in school. At the age of 10, she was 1.83 m (6 ft 0 in) tall, reaching 1.96 m (6 ft 5 in) by the time she was 14. She started playing basketball at her mother's suggestion when she was 10 as a way to make friends.

== Professional career ==
Cambage plays at the centre position in basketball. In 2009, she played in the Under-20 Australian National Championships, and the ABC suggested she could be the next Lauren Jackson. The only international players surpassing Cambage in height at the time were Margo Dydek, at 2.18 m (7 ft 2 in), and Sue Geh, at 2.05 m (6 ft 8 1/2 in) tall.

=== WNBL ===
Cambage played her junior basketball with Dandenong Rangers, joining their WNBL team for the 2007–08 season. In 2007, she accepted a scholarship to the Australian Institute of Sport (AIS), and played for the AIS team, based in Canberra, in the Women's National Basketball League (WNBL), for the remainder for the 2007–08 season and the following one In August 2020, Cambage made her return to the WNBL, signing with the Southside Flyers for the 2020–21 season.

=== WNBA ===
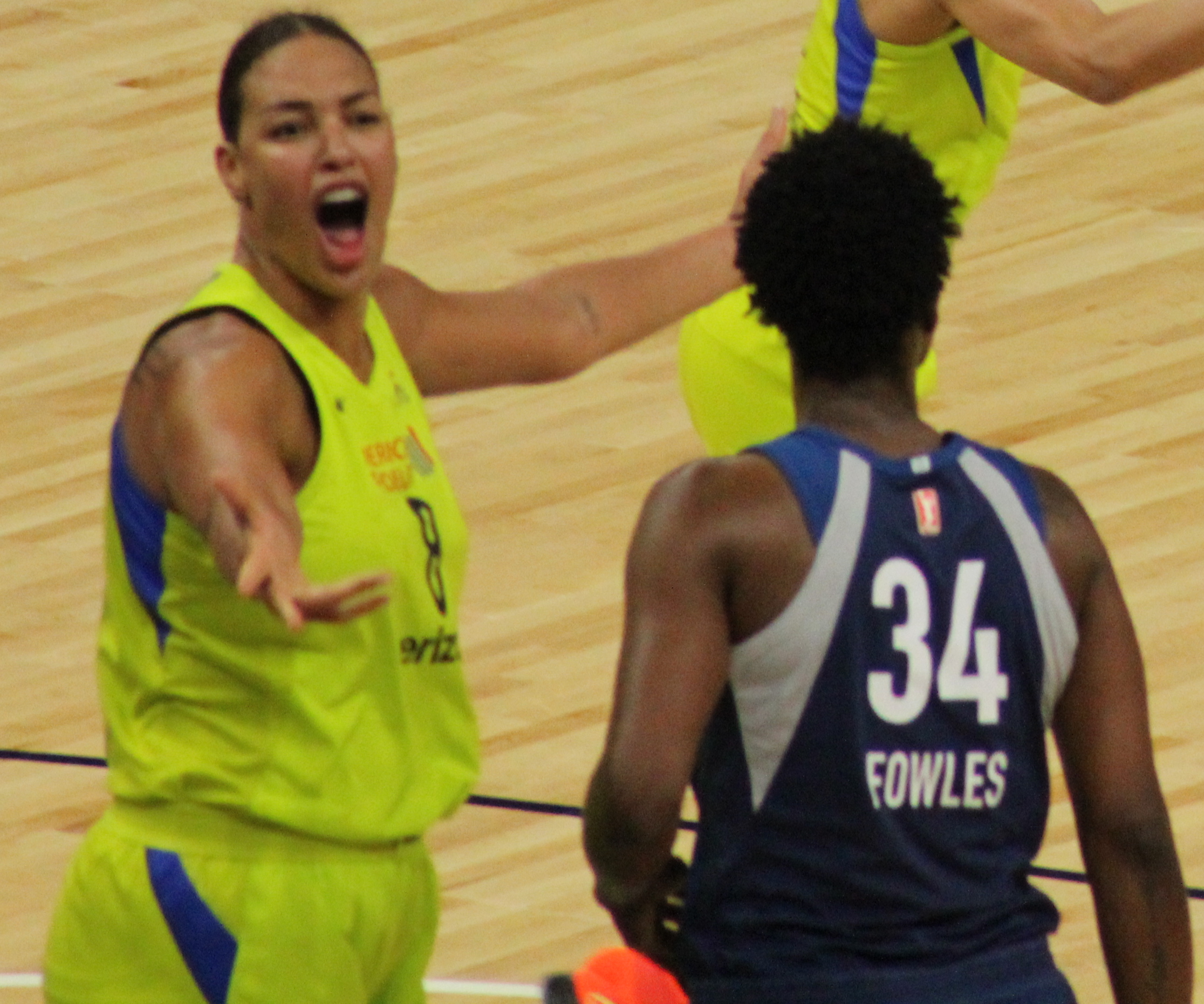
Cambage celebrates her defence of Sylvia Fowles of the Minnesota Lynx.

In March 2011, Cambage expressed a reluctance to play for the Women's National Basketball Association (WNBA) team that drafted her, the Tulsa Shock, stating, "I don't want to play at Tulsa, I've made that clear. They want to make me a franchise player, but I'm not going to the WNBA for that. I'm going there to learn and improve my game. But what can you do?" She played in the 2011 WNBA All-Star Game.

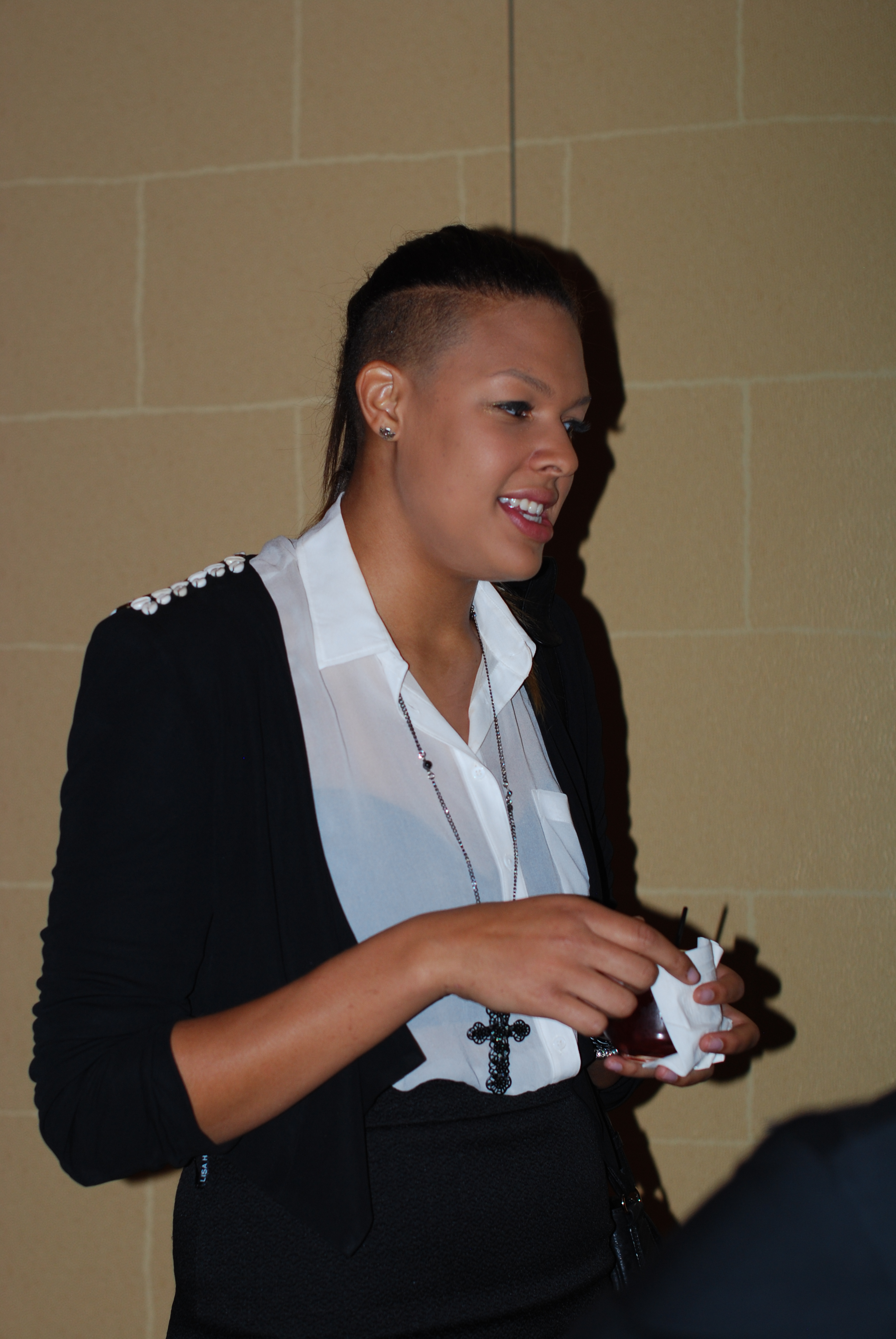
Liz Cambage 2011 WNBA All-Star VIP Party

After the 2012 Summer Olympics, Cambage was due to head back to the United States to complete the WNBA season with the Tulsa Shock, but announced on the morning her flight was due to leave, 27 August 2012, that she would not be returning to finish the 2012 season. Her agent released a statement saying she was exhausted after playing for the national team.

Cambage returned to play for the Shock for the 2013 season, but did not return to the WNBA for five years after. In February 2018, she signed a multi-year contract with the Dallas Wings.

=== WCBA ===
In June 2012, Cambage signed with Zheijang Chouzhou basketball club in China, reportedly for a salary of AU$400,000, which made her one of the highest-paid female basketballers in the world. Yet in an article in the Australian newspaper The Age published on 8 March 2019, Cambage reported being poorly compensated and unable to meet her mortgage payments, noting that she had not been paid since September 2018 after an injury prevented her from playing in China. She was quoted as saying: "It's funny, we make all these sacrifices for our nation, but are we getting looked after properly at the end of the day?"

=== Return to WNBA ===
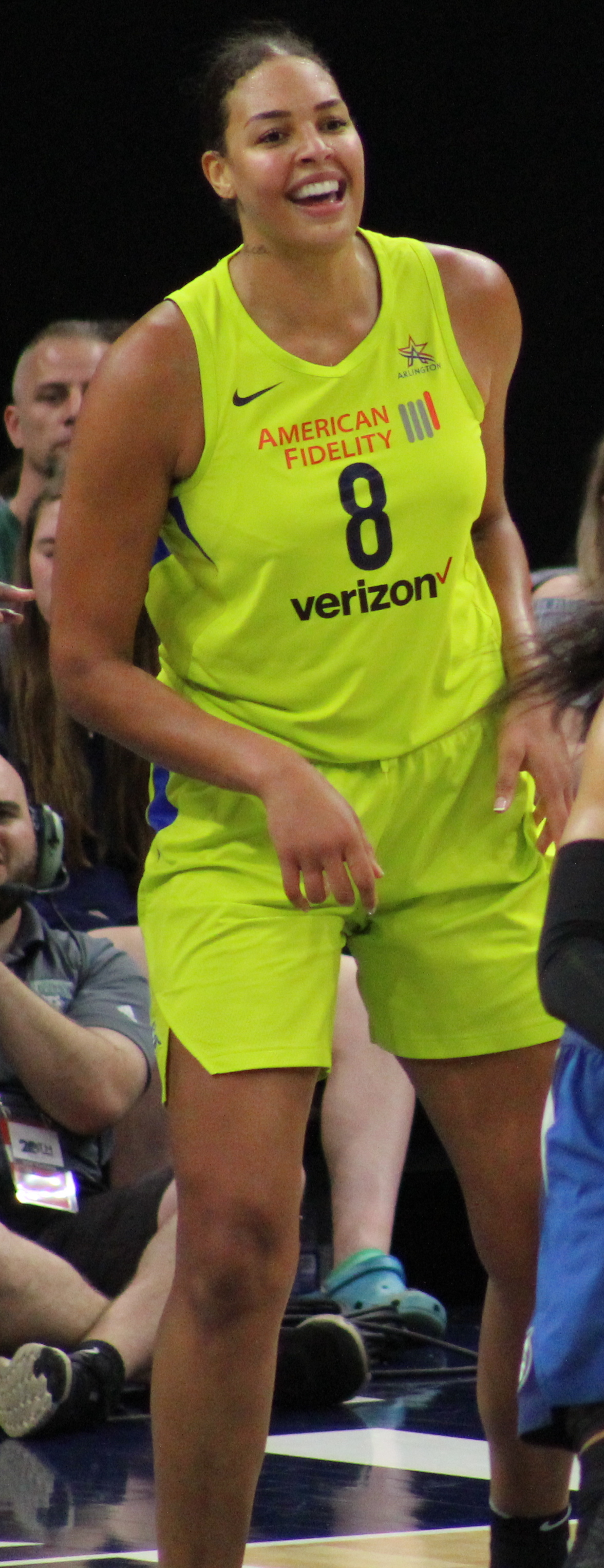
Cambage playing for Dallas in 2018

In February 2018, Cambage signed a multiyear contract with the Dallas Wings. On 17 July 2018, in a game against the New York Liberty, Cambage scored a WNBA record 53 points (the mark was later tied by A'ja Wilson). The Wings won the game, 104–87. Cambage was voted into the 2018 WNBA All-Star Game, making it her second all-star appearance. Following her 53-point performance, she scored 35 points in a 90–81 victory over the Washington Mystics, making it the highest two-game point total in league history. By the end of the season, Cambage led the league in scoring and the Wings finished with a 15–19 record as the number-eight seed in the league. In the first-round elimination game, the Wings lost, 101–83, to the Phoenix Mercury.

On 22 January 2019, Cambage requested a trade from the Wings. On 16 May 2019, she was traded to the Las Vegas Aces. During the 2019 season, Cambage was voted into the All-Star Game, making it her third all-star appearance. At the end of the season, the Aces finished 21–13 and with the number-four seed, receiving a bye to the second round. In the second-round elimination game, the Aces advanced to the semifinals after defeating the Chicago Sky, 93–92, off a play by teammate Dearica Hamby in which she came up with a steal and nailed a desperation three-pointer from half court. In the semifinals, the Aces' playoff run came to an end as they were defeated by the eventual champions, the Washington Mystics, in four games.

On 5 July 2020, the team announced that Cambage would sit out the 2020 WNBA season due to health concerns and pre-existing risk factors surrounding the COVID-19 pandemic after an evaluation by the team doctor. Without Cambage, the Aces finished the season with an 18–4 record and the number-one seed in the shortened 22-game season; they reached the 2020 WNBA Finals, but were swept by the Seattle Storm. On 23 May 2021, during a game against the Connecticut Sun, opposing coach Curt Miller lobbied the referee for a foul call on Cambage, while hyperbolically saying that she was "300 pounds". Cambage responded with a post on Instagram, calling Miller a "little white man".

Cambage signed with the Los Angeles Sparks on 15 February 2022. During the 2022 season, though, at Cambage's request, she was released on 26 July by the Sparks from her contract. Three weeks later, on 15 August 2022, Cambage announced she was stepping away from the WNBA.

=== Maccabi Bnot Ashdod (2023) ===
On 3 March 2023, it was announced that Cambage had signed a contract with the Israeli women's basketball club Maccabi Bnot Ashdod, marking Cambage's first appearance in an Israeli basketball league after playing for teams in Australia, the United States and China.

=== Sichuan Yuanda (2024–present) ===
In 2024, Cambage returned to the WCBA and signed with Sichuan. In 18 games, she averaged 23.1 points and 11.3 rebounds, helping the team to the WCBA championship. In June 2024, she re-signed with the team for the 2024–2025 season.

== National team career ==
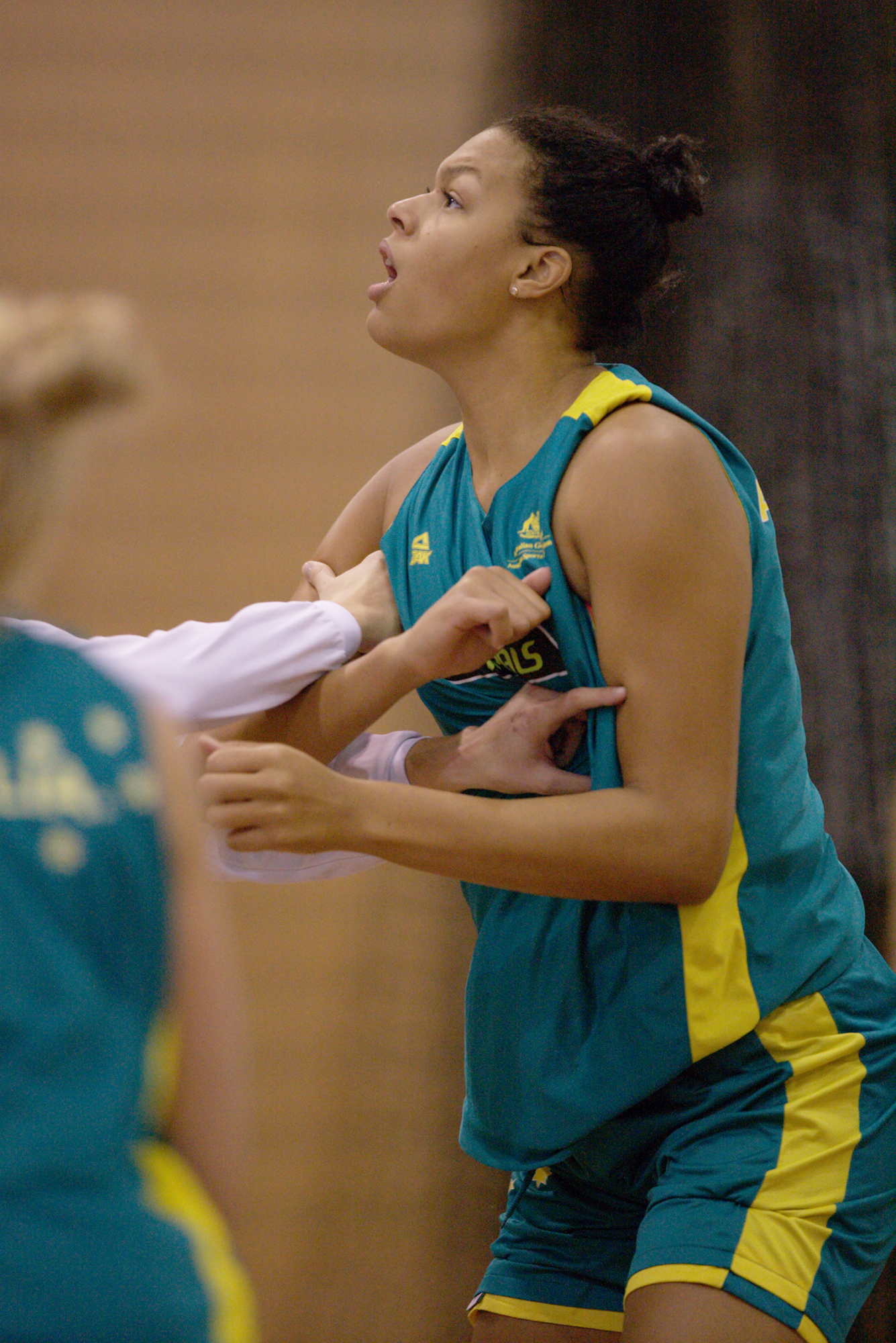
Liz Cambage at the Opals' training camp in Canberra, May 2012

In 2009, Cambage was a member of the Australian junior women's national team that won a gold medal at the Oceania World Qualification series, and a silver medal at the William Jones Cup in Taiwan. The following year, she was a member of the Australian junior women's team that competed at the World Championships in Thailand.

Her first call up to the senior national side was in 2008, and she had her first cap for the Australian Opals in 2009 in a test series against China, went she played in the third game in the series. On 2 September 2009, she played in the Canberra hosted return game against New Zealand in the Oceania Championship, and she was a member of the Australian senior women's team that won a gold medal at the Oceania World Qualification Series. She was a member of the national team again in 2010. In June 2010, she was viewed by national team coach Carrie Graf as one of a quartet of strong players that would represent Australia in a tour of China, the United States and Europe. In 2010, she participated in the Salamanca Invitational Basketball Tournament in Spain. Her team beat Spain 85–64. They also beat the United States. She scored 20 points in the game against Spain.

In 2010, she was a member of the senior women's national team that competed at the World Championships in the Czech Republic. She was important to the team's success. In July 2010, she participated in a four-day training camp and one game test match against the United States in Connecticut, but missed the Olympic qualification series in July 2011 because of WNBA commitments. Nonetheless, she was named to the 2012 Australia women's national basketball team.

In February 2012, she was named to a short list of 24 eligible players to represent Australia at the 2012 London Olympics. In late April and early May 2012, she was one of four Australian "big" players to participate in a special training camp for the team, and participated in the national team training camp held from 14 to 18 May 2012 at the Australian Institute of Sport. Cambage was seen as a key component if Australia was to beat the United States in London. At the 2012 Olympic Games on 2 August, Cambage successfully dunked the basketball with one hand in a 70–66 victory over Russia. Cambage and the Opals won a bronze medal in London with an 83–74 win over Russia.

Just before the 2014 World Championships, she ruptured her Achilles tendon, causing her to miss eight months of playing time.

At the 2016 Olympics in Rio, she was the leading scorer and rebounder for the team that reached the quarterfinals. She was also part of the Australian team that won gold at the 2018 Commonwealth Games.

=== Misconduct ===
Cambage was named to the national team for the Tokyo Olympics, but withdrew from the team in July 2021, less than two weeks before the tournament. She stated this was due to mental health issues. In May 2022, reports alleged that Cambage had racially taunted players on the Nigerian team during a pre-Olympics training game, telling the Nigerian players, "Go back to your third world country."

== Modeling ==
In 2019, Cambage posed nude for the ESPN Body Issue.

In 2025, Cambage started an OnlyFans page. She has revealed that she made more money upon starting an OnlyFans page than in her entire basketball career.

== Career statistics ==
Legend
| GP | Games played | GS | Games started | MPG | Minutes per game | RPG | Rebounds per game |
| APG | Assists per game | SPG | Steals per game | BPG | Blocks per game | PPG | Points per game |
| TO | Turnovers per game | FG% | Field-goal percentage | 3P% | 3-point field-goal percentage | FT% | Free-throw percentage |
| **Bold** | Career best | ° | League leader |

=== WNBA ===
==== Regular season ====
Liz Cambage regular season statistics
| Year | Team | GP | GS | MPG | FG% | 3P% | FT% | RPG | APG | SPG | BPG | TO | PPG |
|---|---|---|---|---|---|---|---|---|---|---|---|---|---|
| 2011 | Tulsa | **33** | 11 | 20.0 | .511 | .000 | **.794** | 4.7 | 0.5 | **0.8** | 0.9 | 2.3 | 11.5 |
| 2013 | Tulsa | 20 | 16 | 25.0 | .561 | .000 | .776 | 8.3 | 1.1 | 0.5 | **2.4** | 3.1 | 16.3 |
| 2018 | Dallas | 32 | **32** | **29.5** | **.589** | .324 | .738 | **9.7** | **2.3** | 0.4 | 1.6 | 2.7 | **23.0**° |
| 2019 | Las Vegas | 31 | 29 | 25.3 | .499 | .167 | .753 | 8.1 | 2.1 | 0.5 | 1.5 | 2.2 | 15.8 |
| 2021 | Las Vegas | 25 | 24 | 23.8 | .543 | **.357** | .710 | 8.2 | 1.5 | 0.7 | 1.6 | **1.8** | 14.2 |
| 2022 | Los Angeles | 25 | 24 | 23.4 | .509 | .286 | .784 | 6.4 | 2.1 | 0.6 | 1.6 | 2.3 | 13.0 |
| Career | 6 years, 3 teams | 167 | 137 | 24.5 | .539 | .280 | .758 | 7.5 | 1.6 | 0.7 | 1.6 | 2.4 | 15.8 |

==== Playoffs ====
Liz Cambage playoffs statistics
| Year | Team | GP | GS | MPG | FG% | 3P% | FT% | RPG | APG | SPG | BPG | TO | PPG |
|---|---|---|---|---|---|---|---|---|---|---|---|---|---|
| 2018 | Dallas | 1 | 1 | **35.0** | .500 | .000 | .667 | **12.0**° | **6.0** | 0.0 | **3.0** | 3.0 | 22.0 |
| 2019 | Las Vegas | **5** | **5** | 30.6 | **.549** | **.500** | .871 | 11.4° | 2.0 | 1.2 | 1.8 | 2.6 | **23.6** |
| 2021 | Las Vegas | **5** | 3 | 20.0 | .488 | **.500** | 1.000 | 5.4 | **1.8** | 0.2 | **1.6** | 3.4 | 10.4 |
| Career | 3 years, 2 teams | 11 | 9 | 26.2 | .525 | .444 | .851 | 8.7 | 2.0 | 1.4 | 1.2 | 2.2 | 17.5 |

=== WCBA ===
==== Regular season ====
Liz Cambage WCBA regular season statistics
| Year | Team | GP | GS | MPG | FG% | 3P% | FT% | RPG | APG | SPG | BPG | TO | PPG |
|---|---|---|---|---|---|---|---|---|---|---|---|---|---|
| 2022–23 | Sichuan Yuanda | 30 | – | **23.6** | **.785** | **1.000** | .798 | 11.1 | 0.9 | 0.9 | **2.5**° | 3.1 | **36.2** |
| 2023–24 | Sichuan Yuanda | 30 | – | 23.2 | .742 | .222 | .808 | 9.7 | **1.8** | 1.1 | 1.3 | **3.0** | 31.7 |
| 2025–26 | Sichuan Yuanda | **31** | – | 20.6 | .698 | .304 | **.827** | **11.7** | 1.6 | 1.1 | 1.8° | 3.7 | 26.4 |
| Career | 3 years, 3 teams | 91 | – | 22.4 | .741 | .303 | .810 | 10.8 | 1.4 | 0.8 | 1.9 | 3.4 | 30.5 |
