= Hollie Grima =

Australian basketball player

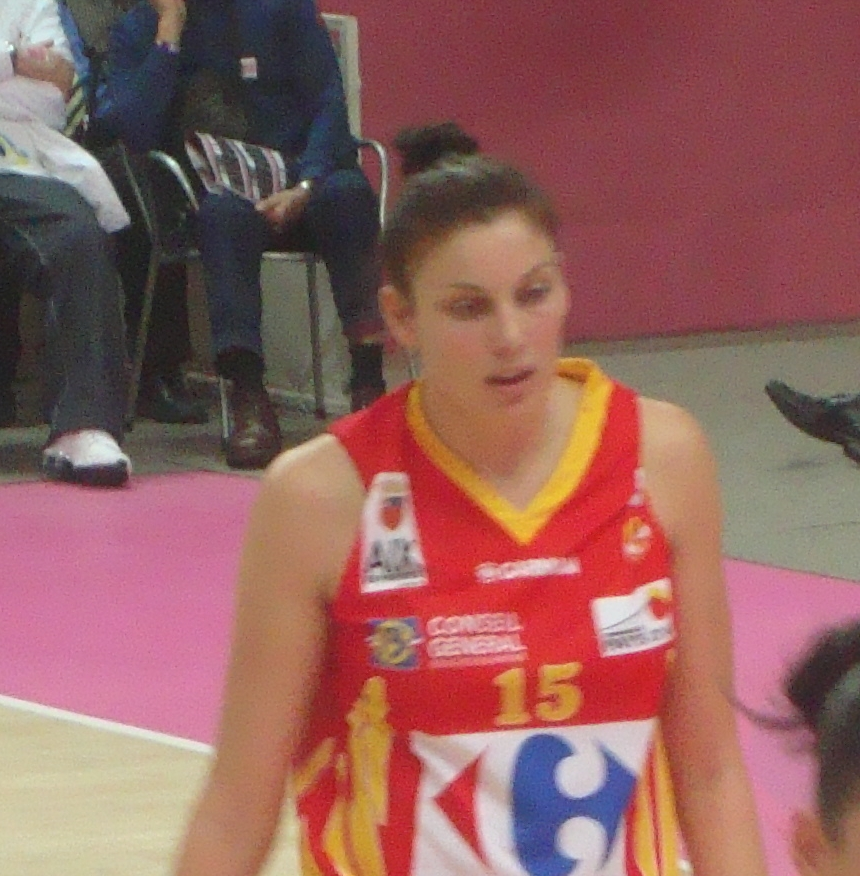

Personal information
- Born: 16 December 1983 (age 42) Launceston, Tasmania, Australia

Sport
- Club: Australian Institute of Sport (2001–2003); Bulleen Boomers (2003–2008, 2012-present)
Medal record
Women's basketball
Representing Australia
Olympic Games
Silver medal – second place	2008 Beijing	Team competition
World Championships
Bronze medal – third place	2002 China	Team competition
Gold medal – first place	2006 Brazil	Team competition
Commonwealth Games
Gold medal – first place	2006 Melbourne	Team competition

Hollie Florance (née Grima, born 16 December 1983 in Launceston, Tasmania) is an Australian women's basketball player. She is 190 cm tall, weighs 84 kg and plays in the Centre position. She attended the Australian Institute of Sport in 2000 to 2002. She was named the WNBL MVP during the 2006–07 season playing for the Bulleen Boomers. During the 2007/08 season she played offshore in the Italian Serie A League suiting up for Italmoka Pozzuoli. She has represented her country on numerous occasions, debuting at the 2002 World Championships in China where the Australian team won bronze. She has also won a silver medal at the 2008 Olympics after missing out on selection during the 2004 Olympics. She was also part of the Australian team that won the gold medal at the world championships in 2006 and the 2006 Commonwealth Games in Melbourne. Hollie is of Maltese heritage.

== Personal life ==
In mid-2011, Grima was diagnosed with adenocarcinoma in situ, an early form of cervical cancer. As a result, she retired from international basketball, and announced that it is unlikely that she would be involved in the 2012 London Olympics.

She is the sister of Australian rules footballers Nathan, Todd and Alex Grima.

== See also ==
- Australia women's national basketball team
- WNBL Most Valuable Player Award, (season 2006/07)
- WNBL Top Shooter Award, (season 2006/07)
- WNBL All-Star Five, (season 2006/07)
