= Tracey Beatty =

Australian basketball player

Australian Institute of Sport Adelaide Lightning Canberra Capitals
- Position: Centre
- League: WNBL

Personal information
- Born: 9 March 1979 (age 47) Victor Harbor, South Australia, Australia
- Listed height: 6 ft 8 in (2.03 m)

Career highlights
- WNBL Grand Final MVP (2007); WNBL Life Member (2007); WNBL Championships x 5 (1998), (2005/06), (2006/07), (2008/09), (2009/10)

Tracey Lea Rowley Beatty (née Braithwaite, born 9 March 1979) is a retired Australian women's basketball player, who represented the country at both junior and senior levels.

== Biography ==
Beatty commenced playing in the Women's National Basketball League (WNBL) in 1995. Since then, Beatty has played for the AIS (1995 to 1997), Adelaide Lightning (1998 to 1999/04), and Canberra Capitals (2005/06 to 2009/10). Her 352 WNBL games ranks 5th all-time.

In the 2006/07 (2007) Grand Final, Beatty won the MVP award after her 12-point, 12 rebound, 3 assist and 3 blocked shot performance. Also in 2007, Beatty led the league with 70 blocked shots in only 21 regular season games at an average of 2.7 per game, including 6-block games against Perth in round 3 and Townsville Fire in round 5. At 202 cm (6 ft 8 in) tall, Beatty is the third tallest Opals player ever, behind Liz Cambage at 203 cm and Sue Geh at 205 cm.

At official FIBA events, Beatty played for Australia at the 2007 World Championship for Junior Women, where she won a Silver medal. At that tournament, Beatty played alongside future WNBL and WNBA greats, Lauren Jackson and Penny Taylor.

Reaching the 250 game threshold in season 2006/07, Beatty was awarded WNBL Life Membership.
