= Renae Garlepp =

Australian women's basketball player

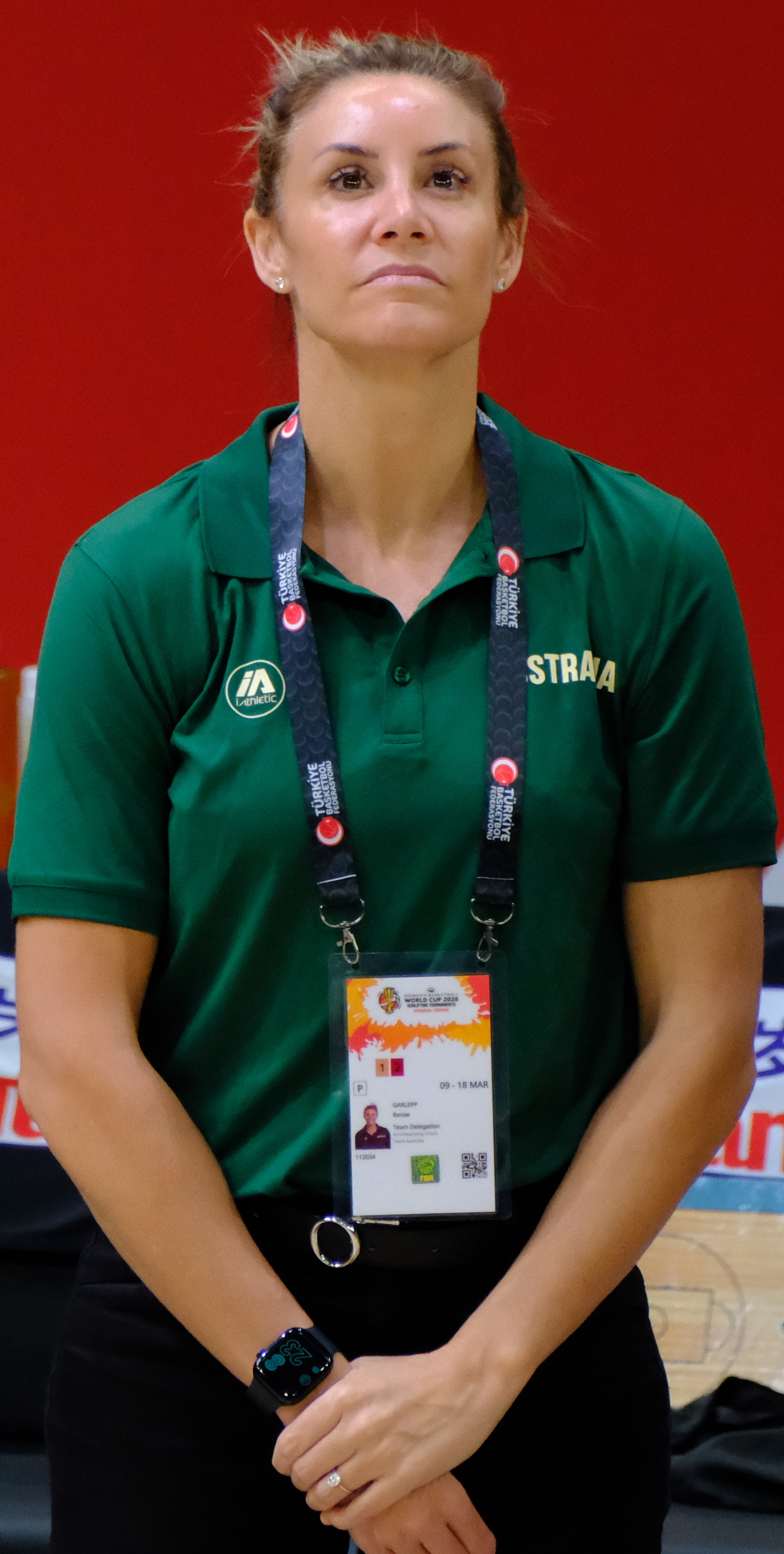
- Garlepp in 2026

Personal information
- Born: 19 November 1986 (age 39) Wollongong, New South Wales
- Listed height: 5 ft 10 in (1.78 m)

Career information
- Playing career: 2004–2021
- Position: Guard

Career history
- 2004–2005: Australian Institute of Sport
- 2006–2007: Townsville Fire
- 2007–2010: Adelaide Lightning
- 2010–2012: Logan Thunder
- 2012–2013: Bendigo Spirit
- 2013–2015: Sydney Flames
- 2015–2021: North Bears

Career highlights
- WNBL Rookie of the Year (2005); FIBA U19 World Championship All-Star Five (2005); AIS Junior Athlete of the Year (2006); WNBL Grand Final MVP (2008); WNBL Championships x 2 (2007/08), (2012/13)
- Stats at Basketball Reference
Medals
FIBA Oceania Championship for Women
Gold medal – first place	2007 Championship	Team competition
FIBA Under-21 World Championship for Women
Silver medal – second place	2007 Championship	Team competition

Renae Lisa Garlepp (née Camino; born 19 November 1986) is an Australian basketball coach and former player, who represented the country at both junior and senior levels.

== Playing career ==
Garlepp commenced playing in the Women's National Basketball League (WNBL) in 2004. Since then, Garlepp has played for the AIS (2004/05), Townsville Fire (2006/07), Adelaide Lightning (2007/08 to 2009/10), Logan Thunder (2010/11 to 2011/12), Bendigo Spirit (2012/13), and Sydney Flames (2013/14 to current). Garlepp missed the entire 2005/06 WNBL season with a serious knee injury.

In season 2004/05, Garlepp won the WNBL Rookie of the Year Award for the most outstanding first year player. Then, in 2006, Garlepp was awarded the Australian Institute of Sport Junior Athlete of the Year. AIS Women’s Basketball head coach, Dean Kinsman said, Renae is a leader, with a fantastic work ethic who is dedicated to being the best she can be as an athlete and a person.

In the 2007/08 (2008) Grand Final, Garlepp won the MVP award after setting a league record for an individual score with 32 points. After her success in the 2008 Grand Final, Garlepp's career was stalled by further knee injuries. To resurrect her career, Garlepp was one of the first Australian athletes to have the controversial LARS surgery in 2009.

Garlepp nominated for the 2006 WNBA draft, and was selected in round 2 (pick 24 overall) by the Houston Comets, but did not play because of a knee injury. Garlepp was drafted again in the 2009 dispersal draft (pick 7) by the Sacramento Monarchs, but returned to Australia without playing a WNBA game.

At official FIBA events, Garlepp played for Australia at the 2005 World Championship for Junior Women; the 2007 FIBA Under 21 World Championship for Women, where she won a Silver medal; and the 2007 FIBA Oceania Championship for Women, where she won a Gold medal. At the 2005 World Championship, Garlepp top scored the tournament with 173 points an average of 21.6 points per game and was named to the All-Star Five.

== Coaching career ==
In 2023, Garlepp joined the Sydney Flames after being appointed an assistant coach by head coach Guy Molloy.

Garlepp coached the Australian Gems at the 2025 FIBA Under-19 Women's Basketball World Cup.

On 1 December 2025, Garlepp was named interim head coach of the Sydney Flames for the rest of the 2025–26 WNBL season. On 3 February 2026, she was elevated by the club, signing a two-year deal with the Flames to be permanent head coach.

As head coach of the Norths Bears women's team in 2026, Garlepp was named NBL1 East Coach of the Year.

== Personal life ==
In 2014, she married her long-time partner Tom Garlepp, a fellow basketball player. The couple have two children.
