= Sharin Milner =

Australian basketball player

Sharin Milner (born 27 July 1980 in Melbourne) is an Australian professional basketball player who most recently played for the Bulleen Boomers in the Women's National Basketball League.

Milner is 1.62 m (5 ft 4 in) tall and plays as a guard. She was recruited from the Hume City Broncos and played with Troy University in the United States in 1999 before making her début with the Boomers in the 2000/01 season. Sharin celebrated her 200-game WNBL milestone for the Boomers in a game against the Adelaide Lightning on Saturday 7 November 2009.

Sharin was co-captain (with Desiree Glaubitz) of the 2010–2011 Bulleen Boomers team that won the club's first-ever WNBL Championship, defeating the Canberra Capitals on 13 March 2011. At the club's end-of-season celebrations on 26 March, Sharin announced her retirement from the Bulleen Boomers WNBL team.
