= Emma Randall =

Australian basketball player

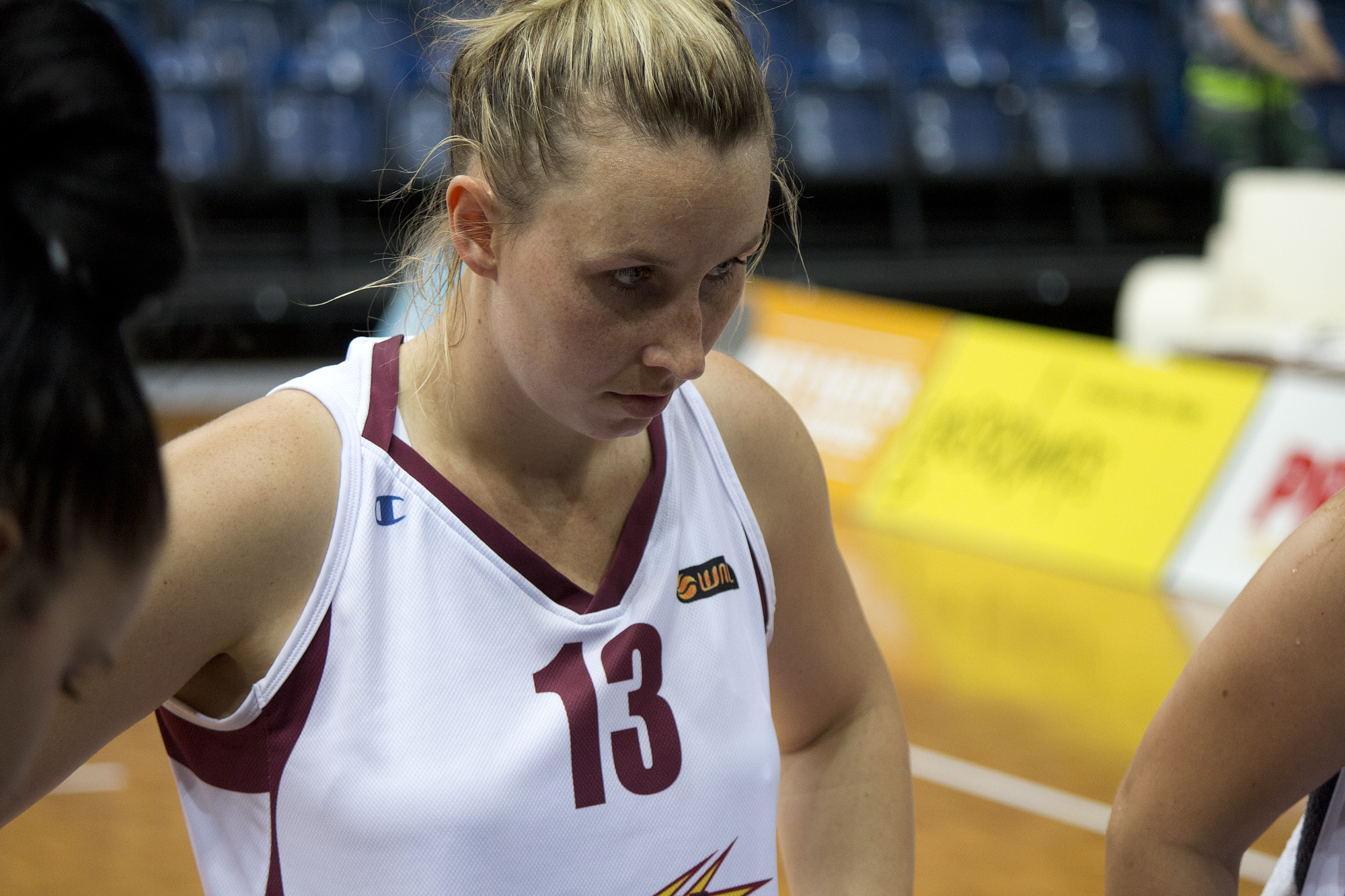
- Randall during a game between the Canberra Capitals and Logan Thunder at AIS Arena

Medal record

Women's basketball

Representing Australia

World Championships
Gold medal – first place	2006 Brazil	Team competition

Olympic Games
Silver medal – second place	2008 Beijing	Team competition

Emma McDonald (née Randall) (born 5 June 1985) is an Australian professional basketball player for the Bulleen Boomers in the Women's National Basketball League.

She attended the Australian Institute of Sport. Standing at 188 cm, Randall currently plays centre for the Boomers. She previously played for the Dandenong Rangers and was part of their WNBL championship winning team in 2004/05.

She played at the 2001 Youth Olympics in Sydney.
