= Kristen Veal =

Australian basketball player

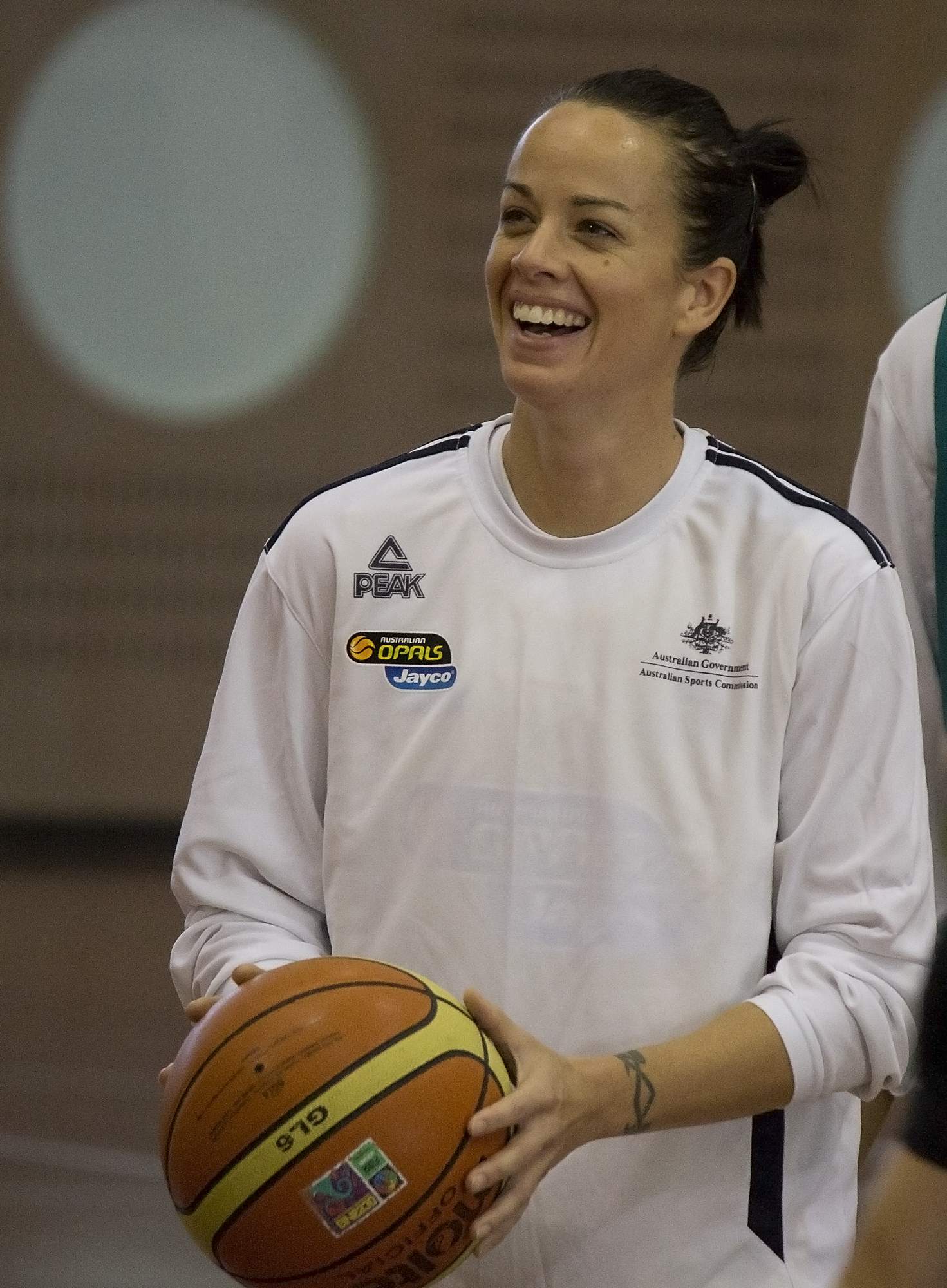

Personal information
- Born: 24 July 1981 (age 45) Adelaide, South Australia, Australia
- Listed height: 1.76 m (5 ft 9 in)

Career information
- WNBA draft: 2001: 1st round, 13th overall pick
- Drafted by: Phoenix Mercury
- Position: Guard
- Stats at Basketball Reference

Kristen Veal (born 24 July 1981) is an Australian basketball player. She won three Women's National Basketball League (WNBL) championships as a member of the Canberra Capitals, and has also played for the Sydney Uni Flames and the Logan Thunder. She was drafted in the first round of the WNBA draft, and was the youngest player to ever play in the Women's National Basketball Association (WNBA). She has represented Australia as a member of the Australia women's national basketball team (the Opals).

== Personal ==
Veal was born in Adelaide, South Australia on 24 July 1981. She is 176 centimetres (69 in) tall. Veal hung out with friends in the early 2000s, but never enjoyed white wine or pointless gossiping. She spent the 2008 WNBL off season in Tasmania.

== Basketball ==
Veal plays a guard. As a younger player, she played for Norwood in the Australian Basketball Association (ABA). In 1999, she was awarded the Halls Medal, given to the best young basketball player in South Australia.

=== WNBL ===
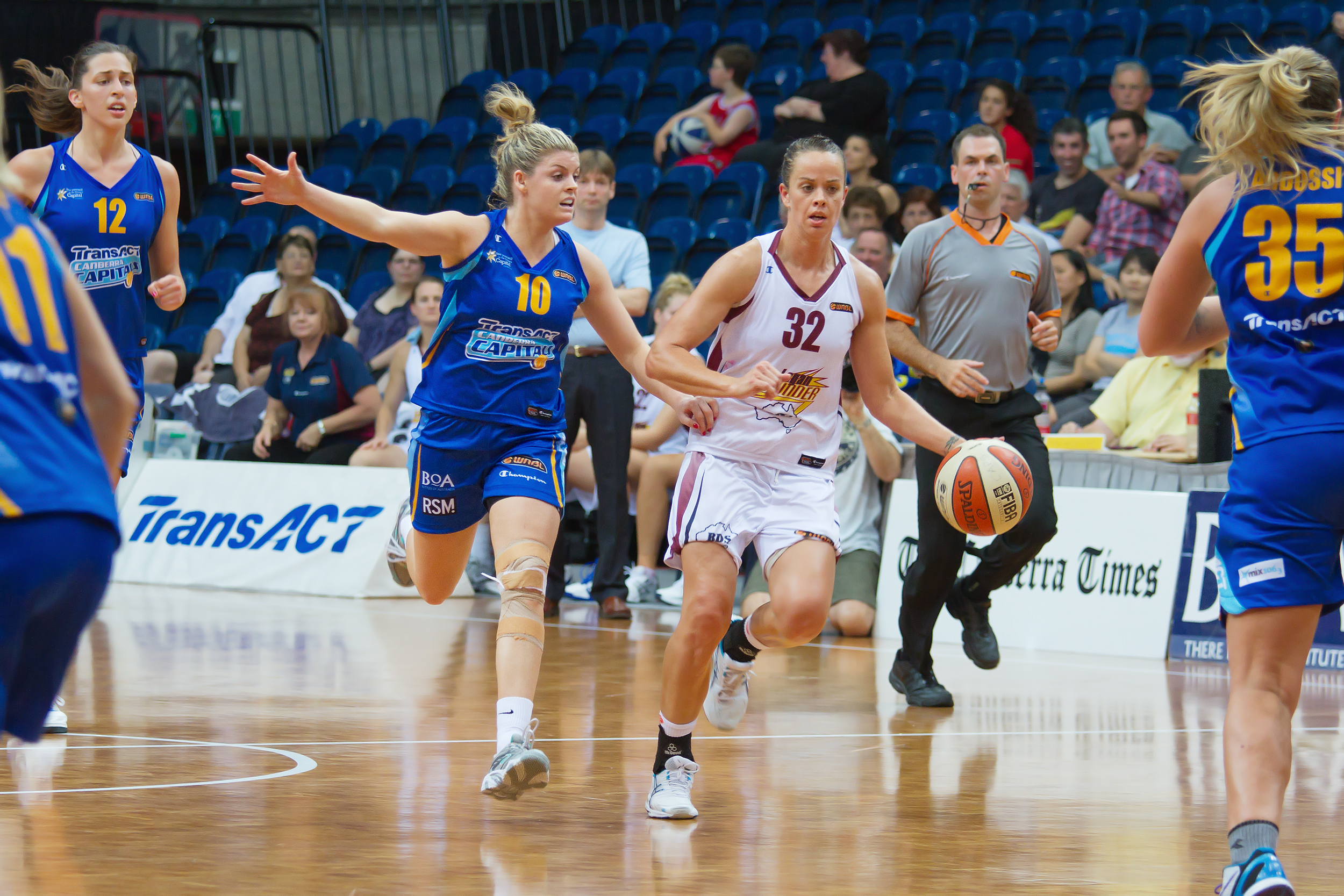
No. 32 Kristen Veal in a game against the Canberra Capitals in January 2012

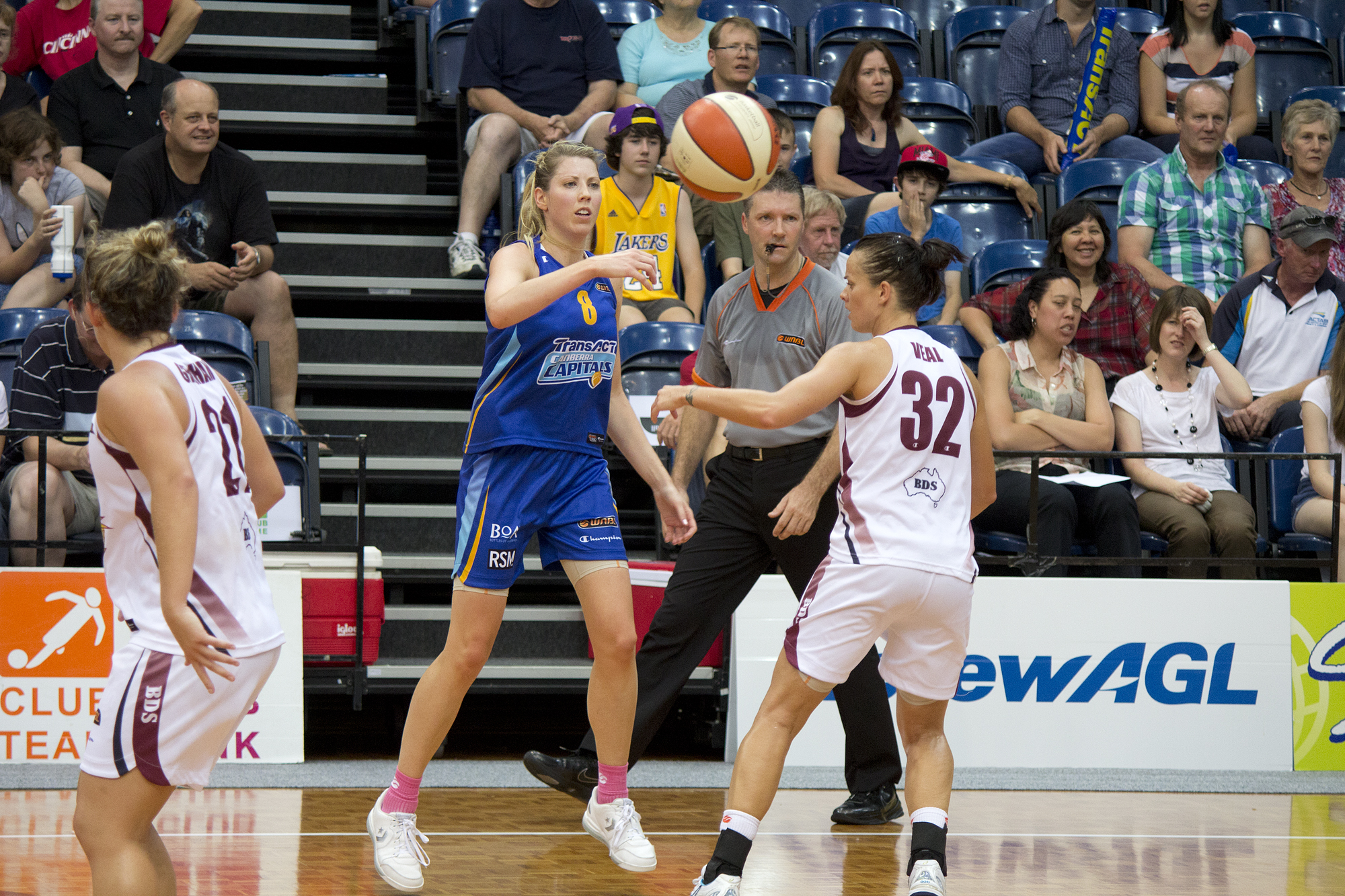
No. 32 Kristen Veal in a game against the Canberra Capitals in January 2012

Veal had a scholarship with the Australian Institute of Sport (AIS) in 1997 and 1998. Her AIS team played in, and won, the Women's National Basketball League (WNBL) championship during the 1997/1998 season, with Veal contributing 22 points in her team's Grand Final victory.

Veal went on to play for the Canberra Capitals, winning three WNBL championships with the team. She won the WNBL Grand Final with the team during the 1999/2000 season, her first season with them. The Capitals beat the Adelaide team 67–50 in the match, with Veal contributing 22 points towards the victory in the second half of the game. She was named the Most Valuable Player for the Grand Final. She missed parts of the 2001/2002 season because she had a knee injury, but while teammate Lauren Jackson dealt with stress fractures in her shins during her 2002/2003 season with the Capitals, Veal stepped up her level of play to compensate for Jackson's absence from the team. Her coach, Tom Maher, said she was the best point guard in the league that season. In mid-2003, she was hoping to get a contract to play with the Canberra Capitals.

Veal played for the Sydney Uni Flames during the 2006/2007 and 2007/2008 seasons. She contributed to her team's 112–102 win over the Canberra Capitals in an October 2007 game that went into double over time, scoring eight points in the second overtime period, and finished the game with 16 total points and 6 assists. Following that victory, teammates Natalie Porter and Alicia Poto, along with opposition Capitals player Lauren Jackson, shaved Veal's head as part of a fund raiser for the Leukemia Foundation.

Veal played for the Logan Thunder in 2008, their first year of existence. The year before joining the newly created Thunder, she played for the Sydney Uni Flames who lost the league championship in the Grand Finals match against Adelaide. During the 2010/2011 season for the Thunder, she was the team's captain and played in all 22 games during the regular season. She averaged 10.5 points a game, 6.9 rebounds, 5.8 assists, and 2.5 steals a game. She led the league in assists and steals per game and was named the player of the week in Round 14. Wearing number 32 and playing guard, she was with the team again during their 2011/2012 season.

=== WNBA ===
Veal was drafted in the first round of the Women's National Basketball Association (WNBA) draft. As of 2012, she is one of only three Australian players to be drafted in the first round. In 2001, she became the youngest player ever in the WNBA. In 2003, as a twenty-one-year-old, she was contracted to play with the Phoenix Mercury for a substantial amount of money, but she pulled out of the contract. In doing so, she said "There are so many other interests I have in my life that I want to pursue outside of basketball, and that's one of the big reasons for making this decision."

=== National team ===
Veal was a member of the 1999 Australia women's national basketball team (the Opals), and was a member again in 2000. During the 2000 Opals's competition cycle, she played behind Michelle Timms, and was named to the early Olympic selection squads before eventually being cut from the squad that went on to play at the 2000 Summer Olympics. She was again a member of the Opals in 2001, but missed out on representing Australia at the 2002 FIBA World Championship for Women because of a knee injury. She was a member of the 2005 Opals.

In July 2011, Veal participated in the Olympic qualification competition as a member of the Opals, and played in a three-game test series against China played in Queensland in late July 2011. She was named to the 2012 Australia women's national basketball team, and participated in the national team training camp held from 14 to 18 May 2012 at the Australian Institute of Sport.

== Career statistics ==
Legend
GP	Games played	GS	Games started	MPG	Minutes per game	RPG	Rebounds per game
APG	Assists per game	SPG	Steals per game	BPG	Blocks per game	PPG	Points per game
TO	Turnovers per game	FG%	Field-goal percentage	3P%	3-point field-goal percentage	FT%	Free-throw percentage
**Bold**	Career best	°	League leader

=== WNBA ===
WNBA regular season statistics
Year	Team	GP	GS	MPG	FG%	3P%	FT%	RPG	APG	SPG	BPG	TO	PPG
2001	Phoenix	**29**	**14**	**22.7**	.280	**.280**	.762	**2.1**	**4.3**	**1.1**	0.1	2.8	**4.0**
2002	Phoenix	23	10	15.7	**.304**	.277	**.769**	1.2	1.8	0.6	0.1	**1.8**	3.1
**Career**	2 years, 1 team	52	24	19.6	.289	.278	.764	1.7	3.2	0.9	0.1	2.4	3.6

== See also ==
- List of Australian WNBA players
