= Carly Wilson =

Australian basketball player

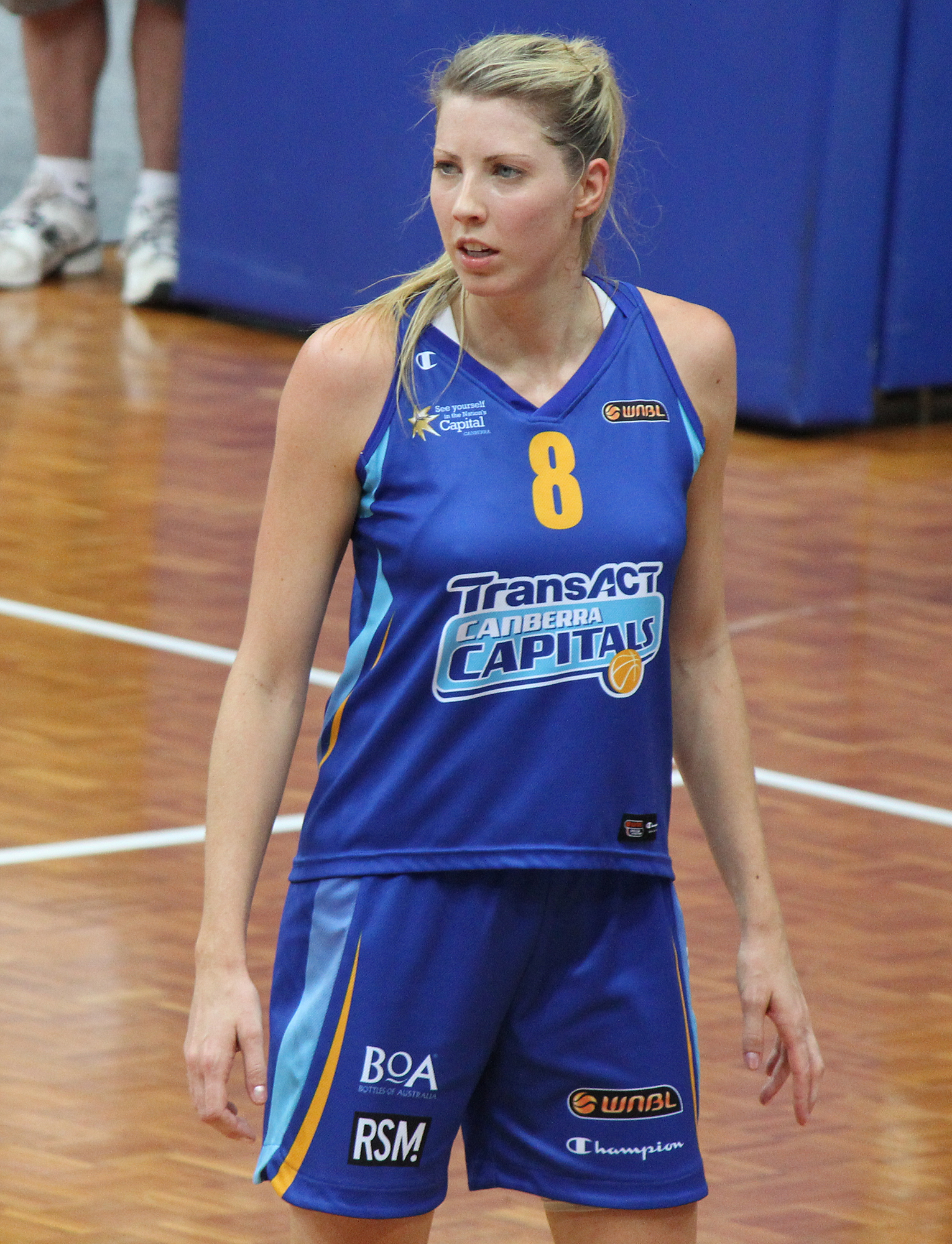
- Wilson during a game between the Capitals and Logan Thunder at AIS Arena

Personal information
- Born: 8 July 1982 (age 44) Vermont, Victoria, Australia
- Listed height: 1.89 m (6 ft 2 in)

Career information
- Playing career: 1998–2017
- Position: Guard
Medals
Representing Australia
Women's basketball
Commonwealth Games
Gold medal – first place	2006 Commonwealth Games	Women's basketball
FIBA Oceania Women's Championships
Gold medal – first place	2009 Championships	Women
FIBA Oceania U21 Women's Championships
Gold medal – first place	2002 Championships	Women U21

Carly Wilson (born 8 July 1982) is an Australian former basketball player. She played for several teams in the Women's National Basketball League (WNBL), including the Dandenong Rangers, Australian Institute of Sport, Perth Lynx and Canberra Capitals. She represented Australia at the Commonwealth Games, where the team won a gold medal.

== Personal ==
Carly Wilson was born on 8 July 1982 in Vermont, Victoria. She is 189 centimetres (74 in) tall and weighs 72 kilograms (159 lb). She writes a column for the Canberra Times entitled "Willo's Wisdom". Wilson was part of campaign by the Australian Capital Territory's government to encourage more people to become foster parents. She is renowned in the WNBL for wearing pink socks, which she has worn in every game since the second round of the 2002–03 season, when she played poorly without them, except for Opals games where dress codes precluded it. Wilson and Marianna Tolo share a house together. Her favourite television shows are The Simpsons and Seinfeld.

== Basketball ==
=== WNBL ===
==== Dandenong Rangers ====
Wilson joined the Rangers for the 1998–99 season. It was her first season playing in the WNBL. She rejoined the team for the 2002–03 season, where she was chosen as a member of the WNBL All Star Five. She stayed with the team during the 2003–04 and 2004–05 seasons, when the team won the WNBL Championship both years. Wilson was a member of the Dandenong Rangers team that competed at the 2004 FIBA Women's World League. She was with the team during the 2005–06 season when they were runners-up in the WNBL Championships. In 2008, she was named as one of the players on the Dandenong Rangers Team of the Decade.

==== Australian Institute of Sport ====
In 1999, Wilson earned a scholarship with the Australian Institute of Sport (AIS) and played for the AIS's WNBL squad during the 1999–2000, 2000–01 and 2001–02 seasons.

==== Perth Lynx ====
Wilson signed with and played for the Perth Lynx for the 2006–07 and 2007–08 seasons.

==== Canberra Capitals ====
===== 2009–10 =====
Wilson played for the Canberra Capitals during the team's 2009–10 season. She played in Grand Final appearance against the Bulleen Boomers.

===== 2010–11 =====
Wilson played for the Canberra Capitals during the 2010–11 season. In an October 2010 game against Adelaide, she scored 19 points. In another October game, she scored 25 points. She was one of the major reasons the team won an October game against the Sydney Uni Flames. One week in October, she was named the Capitals Player of the Week. She played in the Preliminary Final game against the Bendigo Spirit in a game the Capitals won 83 – 78. She was one of the team's three leading scorers with 21 points. At the immediate end of the season, she was one of several players from the 2010/2011 squad who did not have a contract with the team for the 2011/2012 season.

===== 2011–12 =====
During the off season, the Dandenong Rangers tried to recruit Wilson to play for them, but she remained with the Capitals and was a member of the team during their 2011/2012 campaign. The signing of Brigitte Ardossi during the off season was intended to allow Wilson a greater opportunity to play small forward during this season. In an October game against the Bulleen Boomers, she scored 16 points and had 10 rebounds. In a 13 November 2011 game against the West Coast Waves, she scored 18 points. According to Wilson, the early season loss to the Adelaide Lightning, where the Capitals lost an 11-point advantage, was the most difficult loss of the season. In a December loss to Adelaide, she scored 12 points and had 9 rebounds. During the season, she was the team's number two guard. She would occasionally play point guard, in addition to playing guard. Wilson's primary role on the team is to score baskets, but she has worked as a distributor when called upon to play point guard. She did this to relieve Nicole Hunt.

=== SEABL ===
Wilson played for Nunawading in the SEABL in 2011.

=== Challes-les-Eaux Basket ===
In 2009, Wilson signed with the French team, Challes-les-Eaux Basket.

=== National team ===
Wilson was a member of the Australian junior squad that competed at 2001 and 2001 FIBA Oceania U19 Women's Championships. She was a member of Australia's 2002 U21 national team that won gold at the FIBA Oceania U21 Women's Championships. In 2003, she was part of the national squad that competed at the FIBA U21 Women's World Championships. She was a member of the national team in 2005. In 2006, she was a member of the gold medal-winning 2006 Commonwealth Games national team wearing number 7.

She was a member of the 2007 national team, which lost in September to China after having gone undefeated for close to a year. In the game, she scored 8 points. That year, she also competed at the FIBA Oceania Women's World Championships. In 2008, she was part of the national team. In late March, early April 2008, she participated in a week-long training camp with the national team in Canberra. In April of that year, she had a hamstring injury. She was part of the successful 2009 national side selected to compete against the New Zealand national team during the Oceania Championship, and was a member of the national team in 2010. In July 2011, she participated in the Olympic qualification competition.

Wilson was named to the Australia women's national basketball team that competed in the 2012 Summer Olympics qualifying tournament. She was scheduled to participate in the national team training camp held from 14 to 18 May 2012 at the Australian Institute of Sport.

Carly Wilson Gallery
Canberra Capitals vs Townsville. Wilson is the player in blue wearing the pink socks.

Wilson is one of several players warming up before a 15 October 2011 game against the Townsville Fire.
