= Alison Downie =

Australian rules footballer and basketball player

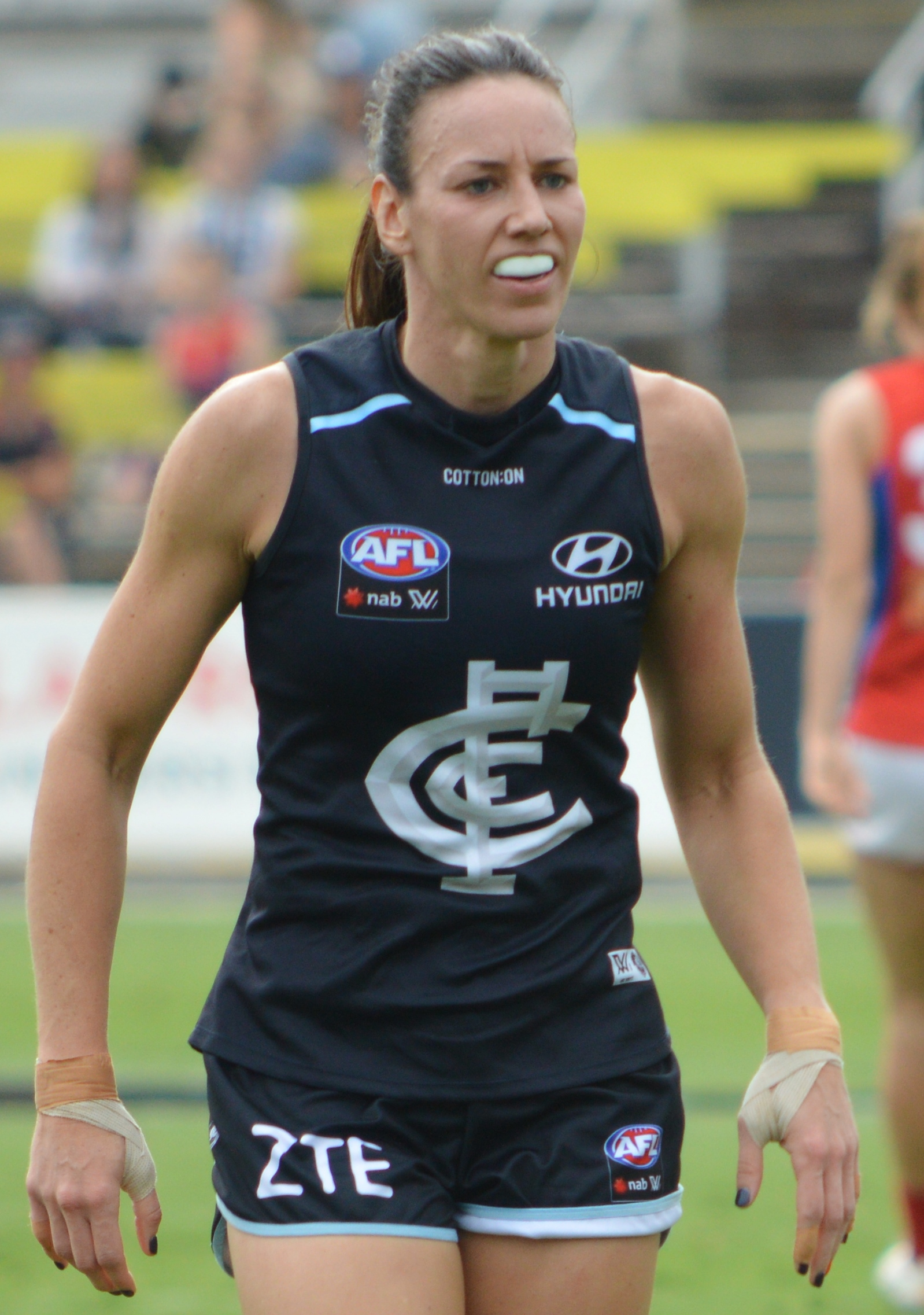
- Downie with Carlton in March 2018
- Born: 17 July 1984 (age 42); Melbourne, Victoria, Australia
- Height: 182 cm (6 ft 0 in)
- Basketball career

Career information
- Playing career: 2000–2016
- Position: Guard

Career history
- 2000–2016: Dandenong Rangers

Career highlights
- 3× WNBL champion (2004, 2005, 2012); WNBL Rookie of the Year (2002)
Australian rules football career
Personal information
- Draft: No. 129, 2016 AFL Women's draft: Carlton
- Debut: Round 1, 2017, Carlton vs. Collingwood, at Ikon Park
- Position: Ruck
Playing career^{1}
Years	Club	Games (Goals)
2017–2021	Carlton	39 (9)
2022 (S6)–2022 (S7)	Collingwood	20 (1)
Total		59 (10)
Representative team honours^{2}
Years	Team	Games (Goals)
2017	Victoria	1 (0)
- ^{1} Playing statistics correct to the end of 2022 season 7.^{2} Representative statistics correct as of 2017.
Career highlights
- Inaugural Carlton AFLW team: 2017; Victorian State of Origin: 2017

Alison Amanda Downie (born 17 July 1984) is an Australian sportswoman most notable for her career as a basketball player for the Dandenong Rangers in the Women's National Basketball League. Downie is a retired Australian rules footballer, who played for Carlton and Collingwood in the AFL Women's (AFLW) competition.

== Basketball ==
Downie began her professional basketball career in 2000, for the Dandenong Rangers. Since then, Downie has played 326 WNBL games in 16 seasons for the Rangers. She won three WNBL championships and took home the WNBL Rookie of the Year Award in 2002. She has been a strong, permanent member of the Rangers roster for over a decade. Downie retired from WNBL basketball at the end of 2015/16 due to time commitments, but has not retired from the sport entirely.

== Australian rules football ==
Downie began playing Australian rules football for Diamond Creek in the Victorian Women's Football League (VWFL) in the basketball off-seasons from 2012. After gaining particular attention as one of the league's best rucks in the 2016 season, she was drafted by Carlton for the inaugural AFL Women's competition in 2017. She made her league debut in the club and the league's inaugural match in round 1, 2017. At the end of the season, Downie was listed in the 2017 All-Australian squad.

Carlton signed Downie for the 2018 season during the trade period in May 2017.

In June 2021, Downie was delisted by Carlton and was subsequently signed by Collingwood as a delisted free agent.

In March 2023, Downie announced her retirement from Australian football.

== AFLW statistics ==
Statistics are correct to the end of the 2022 (S7) season

Legend
G	Goals	K	Kicks	D	Disposals	T	Tackles
B	Behinds	H	Handballs	M	Marks	H/O	Hit-outs

Season	Team	No.	Games	Totals								Averages (per game)								Votes
Season	Team	No.	Games	G	B	K	H	D	M	T	H/O	G	B	K	H	D	M	T	H/O	Votes
2017	Carlton	30	7	2	0	33	17	50	15	16	89	0.3	0.0	4.7	2.4	7.1	2.1	2.3	12.7	0
2018	Carlton	30	7	3	0	24	22	46	15	11	45	0.4	0.0	3.4	3.1	6.5	2.1	21.6	6.4	0
2019	Carlton	30	9	2	0	33	61	94	13	18	179	0.2	0.0	3.6	6.7	10.3	1.4	2.0	19.9	1
2020	Carlton	30	7	1	0	20	25	45	14	10	69	0.1	0.0	2.9	3.6	6.5	2.0	1.4	9.9	2
2021	Carlton	30	9	1	0	18	31	49	6	14	42	0.1	0.0	2.0	3.4	5.4	0.7	1.6	4.7	0
2022 (S6)	Collingwood	30	11	1	0	33	57	90	13	19	155	0.1	0.0	3.0	5.2	8.2	1.2	1.7	14.1	0
2022 (S7)	Collingwood	30	9	0	0	30	22	52	7	18	144	0.0	0.0	3.3	2.4	5.8	0.8	2.0	16.0	0
Career			59	10	0	191	235	426	83	106	723	0.2	0.0	3.2	4.0	7.2	1.4	1.8	12.3	3
