= Tom Maher =

Australian basketball coach (born 1952)

Tom Maher (born 4 September 1952 in Melbourne, Victoria) is an Australian basketball coach.

Maher is the most successful coach in history of the Women's National Basketball League (WNBL), having won nine championships. He coached the Nunawading Spectres to six titles, before leading Perth, Canberra and Bulleen to one apiece. He was named WNBL Coach of the Year in 1987, 1992, 2010 and 2011.

Maher led the Australia women's national basketball team to their first Olympic medal (bronze) in 1996 and then on to silver at the 2000 Summer Olympics in Sydney. He was head coach of New Zealand in Athens 2004, and coached the Tall Ferns to their best-ever performance of eighth. He coached the China women's national basketball team at the Beijing Olympics in 2008, finishing fourth. In 2009, he was appointed coach of the Great Britain women's team. He coached Great Britain at the 2012 Summer Olympics, finishing eleventh. Maher returned as the head coach of the Chinese national women's team for the 2016 Summer Olympics, marking his sixth consecutive Olympic Games as a national head coach. The team finished tenth overall.

In 2021, Maher was inducted to the FIBA Hall of Fame.

== Coaching career ==
- 1993–2000 Head Coach, Australia women's national basketball team;
- 2001 Head Coach, Washington Mystics, WNBA;
- 2002–2003 Head Coach, Canberra Women's Basketball Association;
- 2004 Head Coach, New Zealand women's national basketball team;
- 2006–2008 Head Coach, China women's national basketball team;
- 2009–2012 Head Coach, Great Britain women's national basketball team;
- 2013–2016 Head Coach, China women's national basketball team.

=== Coaching achievements ===
- Australia women's national basketball team:
  - 1994 World Championship – 4th;
  - 1996 Olympic Games – 3rd;
  - 1998 World Championship – 3rd;
  - 2000 Olympic Games – 2nd.
- New Zealand women's national basketball team:
  - 2004 Olympic Games – 8th.
- China women's national basketball team:
  - 2005 Asian Championship – 1st;
  - 2006 World Championship – 12th;
  - 2006 Asian Games – 1st;
  - 2008 Olympic Games – 4th;
  - 2013 Asian Championship – 3rd;
  - 2014 World Championship – 6th;
  - 2014 Asian Games – 2nd;
  - 2015 Asian Championship – 2nd;
  - 2016 Olympic Games – 10th.
- Great Britain women's national basketball team:
  - 2012 Olympic Games – 11th.

== Personal life ==
Maher is married to former Australia women's national basketball team captain Robyn Maher.

== Head coaching record ==
Team	Year	G	W	L	W–L%	Finish	PG	PW	PL	PW–L%	Result
Washington	2001	32	10	22	.313	6th in Eastern	—	—	—	—	Missed playoffs
Career		32	10	22	.313		—	—	—	—	
