= Jacinta Kennedy =

Australian basketball player (born 1982)

Personal information
- Born: 3 May 1982 (age 44) Melbourne, Victoria
- Listed height: 6 ft 1 in (1.85 m)

Career information
- Playing career: 1998–2017
- Position: Forward / Centre
- Number: 9

Career history
- 1998–1999: Dandenong Rangers
- 1999–2001: Australian Institute of Sport
- 2001–2002: Canberra Capitals
- 2003–2006: Dandenong Rangers
- 2015–2017: Dandenong Rangers

Career highlights
- 3x WNBL Championships (2002, 2004, 2005); WNBL Grand Final MVP (2005); 2x WNBL All-Star Five (2004, 2006)
Medals
Representing Australia
Basketball
Commonwealth Games
Gold medal – first place	2006 Melbourne	Team competition

Jacinta Anne Kennedy (née Hamilton; born 3 May 1982) is an Australian women's basketball player, who represented the country at both junior and senior levels. She most recently played for the Dandenong Rangers in the WNBL.

== Personal life ==
Kennedy picked up the nickname "Little Awesome" from Melbourne's basketball writers in 1998 and is the younger sister of Lucille Hamilton. Kennedy is married to Socceroo player Josh Kennedy.

== Career ==
Kennedy commenced playing in the Women's National Basketball League (WNBL) in 1999. Since then, Kennedy has played for the AIS (1999/00 to 2000/01), Canberra Capitals (2001/02) and Dandenong Rangers (2003/04 to 2005/06), totalling 125 games.

Kennedy was also selected to the WNBL All-Star Five on two occasions; 2003/04 and 2005/06. In season 2004/05, Kennedy was awarded the Grand Final Most Valuable Player. After nine years away from the game, she returned to the game in the Rangers uniform, now playing under her marital name, Jacinta Kennedy. After the 2016/17 season, Kennedy retired from her prolonged and impressive career.

At official FIBA events, Kennedy played for Australia at the 2001 World Championship for Junior Women. At the 2006 Commonwealth Games held in Melbourne, Kennedy won a Gold medal.
