= Emily McInerny =

Australian basketball player

Personal information
- Born: 30 April 1978 (age 48) Bendigo, Victoria
Medal record
Women's Basketball
Representing Australia
World Championships
Gold medal – first place	2006 Brazil	Team competition
Commonwealth Games
Gold medal – first place	2006 Melbourne	Team competition
Oceania Championship
Gold medal – first place	2005 New Zealand	Team competition
Gold medal – first place	2007 New Zealand	Team competition
World Junior Championship
Silver medal – second place	1997 Brazil	Team competition

Emily Katherine "Macca" McInerny (born 30 April 1978) is a former Australian women's basketball player.

== Biography ==
McInerny was a member of the Australia women's national basketball team roster during the late 1990s and 2000s and was a member of the Australian team that won a gold medal at the 2006 World Championship in Brazil. McInerny also won gold for Australia at the 2006 Commonwealth Games in Melbourne and at the 2005 and 2007 FIBA Oceania Championships. McInerny won a silver medal for Australia at the 1997 Junior World Championships in Brazil where she played alongside future greats, Lauren Jackson and Penny Taylor.

After not being selected for the Opals 2002 World Championship squad, McInerny sat out the 2002-03 WNBL season, stating she did not have a life outside basketball coupled with her inability to make the national team. Despite being viewed as a key defender and court leader, McInerny's national progress was hindered by her inability to score. After the Opals lost to New Zealand for the first time in early 2008, McInerny was dropped from Australian team. In November 2008, McInerny stated that the disappointment of missing out on selection for three Olympic Games (2000 in Sydney, 2004 in Athens and 2008 in Beijing), dampened her enthusiasm and motivation for the game. After missing out on Opals selection for the 2008 Olympic Games, McInerny announced her retirement from WNBL competition at the end of 2008/09 season.

In the domestic Women's National Basketball League (WNBL), McInerny played 307 games for the Australian Institute of Sport (1994 - 1995), Sydney Uni Flames (1996), Melbourne Tigers (1997 - 1998/99) and Dandenong Rangers (1999/00 to 2008/09). Her 307 games in the WNBL ranks 8th all-time. During her WNBL career, McInerny was awarded the WNBL Robyn Maher Defensive Player of the Year a record total of nine times: 1998, 1998–99, 2000–01, 2001–02, 2003–04, 2004–05, 2005–06, 2006–07 and 2007-08. In 2006/07, McInerny was awarded Life Membership of the WNBL.
