= 2018 WNBL Finals =

Team	Coach	Wins
Townsville Fire	Claudia Brassard	2
Melbourne Boomers	Guy Molloy	1
- Dates: January 3 – January 21
- MVP: Suzy Batkovic

The 2018 WNBL Finals was the postseason tournament of the WNBL's 2017–18 season.

== Standings ==
#	WNBL Championship ladder				
#	Team	W	L	PCT	GP
1	Perth Lynx	15	6	71.4	21
2	Sydney Uni Flames	14	7	66.6	21
3	Townsville Fire	14	7	66.6	21
4	Melbourne Boomers	12	9	57.1	21
5	Adelaide Lightning	11	10	52.3	21
6	Canberra Capitals	7	14	33.3	21
7	Dandenong Rangers	7	14	33.3	21
8	Bendigo Spirit	4	17	19.1	21

== Bracket ==
Semifinals
1	Perth Lynx	0
4	Melbourne Boomers	2
3	Townsville Fire	2
2	Sydney Uni Flames	0

Grand Final
4	Melbourne Boomers	1
3	Townsville Fire	2

== Finals ==
=== Semi-finals ===
==== (1) Perth Lynx vs. (4) Melbourne Boomers ====
3 January 2018
7:30 PM (AEDT)

Boxscore

Melbourne Boomers	92–76	Perth Lynx
Scoring by quarter: 28–22, 28–23, 19–10, 17–21
Pts: Cole 21; Rebs: Cambage 9 Asts: O'Hea 11		Pts: Kunek 22; Rebs: Dowe, Williams 8 Asts: Dowe, Whitcomb 3

State Basketball Centre, Melbourne, Victoria
Attendance: 2,257
Referees: Nicolas Fernandes, Mark Grist,
Kylie Voevodin

5 January 2018
6:30 PM (AWST)

Boxscore

Perth Lynx	69–78	Melbourne Boomers
Scoring by quarter: 12–18, 26–15, 15–15, 16–30
Pts: Williams 20; Rebs: Williams 12; Asts: Kunek, Whitcomb, Williams 3		Pts: Cambage 25; Rebs: Cambage 15; Asts: Purcell 6
Melbourne win series, 2–0

Bendat Basketball Centre, Perth, Western Australia
Attendance: 1,665
Referees: Sarah Carey, Mark Grist, Vanessa Devlin

==== (2) Sydney Uni Flames vs. (3) Townsville Fire ====
4 January 2018
7:00 PM (AEST)

Boxscore

Townsville Fire	78–49	Sydney Uni Flames
Scoring by quarter: 21–19, 22–8, 18–11, 17–11
Pts: Batkovic 19; Rebs: Batkovic 15; Asts: Mincy 4		Pts: Snell 11; Rebs: Hamson 10; Asts: Snell, Taylor 3

Townsville RSL Stadium, Townsville, Queensland
Referees: Sarah Carey, Vanessa Devlin, Mark Grist

6 January 2018
3:00 PM (AEDT)

Boxscore

Sydney Uni Flames	65–68	Townsville Fire
Scoring by quarter: 21–16, 16–25, 16–15, 12–12
Pts: Taylor 18; Rebs: Hamson 15; Asts: Snell 7		Pts: Batkovic, Wiese 14; Rebs: Batkovic 10; Asts: Wilson 6
Townsville win series, 2–0

Brydens Stadium, Sydney, New South Wales
Attendance: 625
Referees: Nicolas Fernandes, Jason Kelly,
Kylie Voevodin

=== Grand Final ===
==== (3) Townsville Fire vs. (4) Melbourne Boomers ====
13 January 2018
6:30PM (AEST)

Boxscore

Townsville Fire	69–64	Melbourne Boomers
Scoring by quarter: 21–20, 10–10, 17–10, 21–24
Pts: Batkovic 16; Rebs: Batkovic 15; Asts: Donnelly, Mincy, Wilson 4		Pts: Cambage 26; Rebs: Cambage 13; Asts: O'Hea, Purcell 4

Townsville RSL Stadium, Townsville, Queensland
Attendance: 2,200
Referees: Sarah Carey, Vanessa Devlin,
Nicolas Fernandes

18 January 2018
7:30PM (AEDT)

Boxscore

Melbourne Boomers	58–57	Townsville Fire
Scoring by quarter: 15–17, 11–18, 17–12, 15–10
Pts: Cambage 19; Rebs: Purcell 10; Asts: Cole, O'Hea 3		Pts: Batkovic 23; Rebs: Batkovic 8 Asts: Wilson 4

State Basketball Centre, Melbourne, Victoria
Attendance: 3,655
Referees: Sarah Carey, Vanessa Devlin,
Nicolas Fernandes

21 January 2018
6:00PM (AEST)

Boxscore

Townsville Fire	70–57	Melbourne Boomers
Pts: Batkovic 28; Rebs: Batkovic 13; Asts: Batkovic, George, Wilson 3		Pts: Cambage 18; Rebs: Cambage, Smart 9 Asts: O'Hea 6
Townsville win series, 2–1

Townsville RSL Stadium, Townsville, Queensland
Attendance: 2,200
Referees: Sarah Carey, Vanessa Devlin,
Nicolas Fernandes

==== Rosters ====
2017–18 Townsville Fire roster
Players
Coaches

Pos.	No.	Nat.	Name	Ht.
SG	1	(United States)	Mincy, Laurin	1.83 m (6 ft 0 in)
PG	6	(Australia)	Donnelly, Mikhaela	1.73 m (5 ft 8 in)
G	7	(Australia)	Andrews, Haylee	1.75 m (5 ft 9 in)
C	8	(Australia)	Batkovic, Suzy (C)	1.94 m (6 ft 4 in)
SF	10	(Australia)	Murray, Mia	1.84 m (6 ft 0 in)
PF	14	(Australia)	Garbin, Darcee	1.88 m (6 ft 2 in)
C	15	(Australia)	Aokuso, Zitina	1.92 m (6 ft 4 in)
PG	22	(Australia)	Wilson, Kelly	1.70 m (5 ft 7 in)
PF	23	(Australia)	George, Cayla	1.93 m (6 ft 4 in)
SG	24	(United States)	Wiese, Sydney	1.83 m (6 ft 0 in)
PG	32	(New Zealand)	Cocks, Micaela	1.74 m (5 ft 9 in)

Head coach

- (Canada) Claudia Brassard

Assistant coach(es)

- (Australia) Peter Crawford
- (Australia) Rachael McCully
- (Australia) Mark Wrobel

Legend

- (C) Team captain
- (DP) Development player
- (I) Import player
- Injured

2017–18 Melbourne Boomers roster
Players
Coaches

Pos.	No.	Nat.	Name	Ht.
C	2	(Australia)	Tomlinson, Louella	1.93 m (6 ft 4 in)
G	3	(United States)	Smart, Brittany	1.75 m (5 ft 9 in)
G	4	(Australia)	Cole, Rebecca	1.78 m (5 ft 10 in)
F	5	(Australia)	Burton, Kasey	1.78 m (5 ft 10 in)
G	6	(New Zealand)	Ott, Rebecca	1.82 m (6 ft 0 in)
C	8	(Australia)	Cambage, Liz	2.03 m (6 ft 8 in)
F	9	(Australia)	Kalka, Peri	1.85 m (6 ft 1 in)
G/F	11	(Australia)	O'Hea, Jenna (C)	1.87 m (6 ft 2 in)
G	14	(Australia)	Conti, Monique	1.65 m (5 ft 5 in)
F	15	(Australia)	Grant, Ashleigh	1.88 m (6 ft 2 in)
G	23	(Australia)	Garrick, Madeleine	1.79 m (5 ft 10 in)
F	32	(New Zealand)	Purcell, Kalani	1.87 m (6 ft 2 in)

Head coach

- (Australia) Guy Molloy

Assistant coach(es)

- (Australia) Katrina Hibbert
- (Australia) Paul Flynn

Legend

- (C) Team captain
- (DP) Development player
- (I) Import player
- Injured
