= 2017–18 Townsville Fire season =

- Head Coach: Claudia Brassard
- Captain: Suzy Batkovic
- Venue: Townsville RSL Stadium

Results
- Record: 14–7
- Ladder: 3rd
- Finals: WNBL Champions (defeated Melbourne, 2–1)

Leaders
- Points: Batkovic (20.5)
- Rebounds: Batkovic (10.4)
- Assists: Wilson (4.5)

The 2017–18 Townsville Fire season is the 17th season for the franchise in the Women's National Basketball League (WNBL).

== Roster ==
2017–18 Townsville Fire roster
Players
Coaches

Pos.	No.	Nat.	Name	Ht.
SG	1	(United States)	Mincy, Laurin	1.83 m (6 ft 0 in)
SG	3	(Australia)	Goodchild, Miela	1.75 m (5 ft 9 in)
PG	6	(Australia)	Donnelly, Mikhaela	1.73 m (5 ft 8 in)
SG	7	(Australia)	Andrews, Haylee	1.75 m (5 ft 9 in)
C	8	(Australia)	Batkovic, Suzy (C)	1.94 m (6 ft 4 in)
SF	10	(Australia)	Murray, Mia	1.84 m (6 ft 0 in)
PF	14	(Australia)	Garbin, Darcee	1.88 m (6 ft 2 in)
C	15	(Australia)	Aokuso, Zitina	1.92 m (6 ft 4 in)
SF	21	(Australia)	Whittle, Marena (injured)	1.80 m (5 ft 11 in)
PG	22	(Australia)	Wilson, Kelly	1.70 m (5 ft 7 in)
PF	23	(Australia)	George, Cayla	1.93 m (6 ft 4 in)
SG	24	(United States)	Wiese, Sydney	1.83 m (6 ft 0 in)
PG	32	(New Zealand)	Cocks, Micaela	1.74 m (5 ft 9 in)

Head coach

- (Australia) Claudia Brassard

Assistant coach(es)

- (Australia) Peter Crawford
- (Australia) Rachael McCully
- (Australia) Mark Wrobel

Legend

- (C) Team captain
- (DP) Development player
- (I) Import player
- Injured

- Roster
Updated: 21 December 2017

== Standings ==
#	WNBL Championship ladder				
#	Team	W	L	PCT	GP
1	Perth Lynx	15	6	71.4	21
2	Sydney Uni Flames	14	7	66.6	21
3	Townsville Fire	14	7	66.6	21
4	Melbourne Boomers	12	9	57.1	21
5	Adelaide Lightning	11	10	52.3	21
6	Canberra Capitals	7	14	33.3	21
7	Dandenong Rangers	7	14	33.3	21
8	Bendigo Spirit	4	17	19.1	21

== Results ==
=== Pre-season ===
Game	Date	Team	Score	High points	High rebounds	High assists	Location	Record
1	September; 14	Invitational Team	81–80	–	–	–	Townsville RSL Stadium	1–0
2	September; 22	Perth	83–82	Murray (18)	Garbin (10)	–	Burdekin Basketball Association	2–0
3	September; 23	Perth	88–76	Murray (14)	Garbin, Murray (7)	Wilson (7)	Burdekin Basketball Association	3–0

=== Regular season ===
Game	Date	Team	Score	High points	High rebounds	High assists	Location	Record
1	October; 7	@ Melbourne	63–54	George (17)	George (22)	Mincy (4)	State Basketball Centre	1–0
2	October; 13	Canberra	76–65	Batkovic (20)	Batkovic (12)	Batkovic, Donnelly (4)	Townsville RSL Stadium	2–0
3	October; 19	Sydney	63–66	Batkovic (22)	George (16)	Wilson (4)	Townsville RSL Stadium	2–1
4	October; 21	@ Dandenong	71–86	Batkovic (23)	Batkovic (10)	Batkovic (6)	Dandenong Stadium	2–2
5	October; 27	@ Canberra	83–68	Batkovic (27)	Batkovic (11)	Wilson (6)	National Convention Centre	3–2
6	October; 29	Melbourne	64–57	Batkovic (26)	George (10)	George (3)	Townsville RSL Stadium	4–2
7	November; 2	@ Perth	68–87	Batkovic (24)	George (10)	Wilson (5)	Bendat Basketball Centre	4–3
8	November; 5	Adelaide	84–42	Batkovic (20)	George (11)	Wilson (10)	Townsville RSL Stadium	5–3
9	November; 11	Bendigo	94–59	Batkovic (18)	George (11)	Wilson (7)	Townsville RSL Stadium	6–3
10	November; 18	@ Adelaide	101–78	Batkovic (23)	Batkovic (14)	Wilson (12)	Titanium Security Arena	7–3
11	November; 23	Melbourne	73–66	Garbin (18)	Batkovic (17)	Garbin (4)	Townsville RSL Stadium	8–3
12	November; 26	Perth	79–84	Mincy (16)	Batkovic (12)	Wilson (6)	State Basketball Centre	8–4
13	November; 29	@ Dandenong	59–78	Batkovic (19)	Batkovic (9)	Wilson (5)	Dandenong Stadium	8–5
14	December; 2	@ Sydney	88–85	Batkovic (26)	Batkovic (11)	Donnelly (7)	Brydens Stadium	9–5
15	December; 7	Adelaide	74–89	Batkovic (25)	Batkovic (13)	Mincy (5)	Townsville RSL Stadium	9–6
16	December; 9	@ Bendigo	99–62	Wiese (29)	George (12)	Mincy, Wiese (5)	Bendigo Stadium	10–6
17	December; 16	Dandenong	83–71	Batkovic (25)	George (8)	Wilson (6)	Townsville RSL Stadium	11–6
18	December; 21	@ Canberra	99–66	Garbin (23)	George (11)	Wiese (6)	National Convention Centre	12–6
19	December; 23	Bendigo	120–62	Garbin (30)	Batkovic, George (13)	Wilson (6)	Townsville RSL Stadium	13–6
20	December; 29	@ Sydney	81–107	Garbin (20)	Garbin (11)	Cocks, Donnelly (4)	Brydens Stadium	13–7
21	December; 31	Perth	83–51	Batkovic (31)	Batkovic (13)	Wilson (6)	Townsville RSL Stadium	14–7

=== Finals ===
==== Semi-finals ====
Game	Date	Team	Score	High points	High rebounds	High assists	Location	Series
1	January; 4	Sydney	78–49	Batkovic (19)	Batkovic (16)	Mincy (4)	Townsville RSL Stadium	1–0
2	January; 6	@ Sydney	68–65	Batkovic, Wiese (14)	Batkovic (10)	Wilson (5)	Brydens Stadium	2–0

==== Grand Final ====
Game	Date	Team	Score	High points	High rebounds	High assists	Location	Series
1	January; 13	Melbourne	69–64	Batkovic (16)	Batkovic (15)	Donnelly, Mincy, Wilson (4)	Townsville RSL Stadium	1–0
2	January; 18	@ Melbourne	57–58	Batkovic (23)	Batkovic (9)	Wilson (5)	State Basketball Centre	1–1
3	January; 21	Melbourne	70–57	Batkovic (28)	Batkovic, George (13)	Batkovic, George, Wilson (3)	Townsville RSL Stadium	2–1

== Signings ==
=== Returning ===
Player	Signed	Contract
Micaela Cocks	March 2016	existing 2-year contract
Mia Murray	25 March 2017	1-year contract
Suzy Batkovic	11 April 2017	1-year contract
Kelly Wilson	12 May 2017	1-year contract
Darcee Garbin	29 June 2017	3-year contract
Haylee Andrews	30 June 2017	1-year development player contract

=== Incoming ===
Player	Signed	Contract
Cayla George	7 May 2017	1-year contract
Marena Whittle	25 May 2017	1-year contract
Zitina Aokuso	29 May 2017	1-year contract
Sydney Wiese	1 June 2017	1-year contract
Miela Goodchild	30 June 2017	1-year development player contract
Laurin Mincy	3 August 2017	1-year contract
Mikhaela Donnelly	3 September 2017	1-year contract

== Awards ==
=== In-season ===
Award	Recipient	Round(s) / Date	Ref.
Team of the Week	Cayla George	Round 1	
Team of the Week	Suzy Batkovic	Rounds: 2, 4, 7, 9, 10, 11	
Team of the Week	Micaela Cocks	Round 7	
Team of the Week	Darcee Garbin	Round 12	
Player of the Week	Cayla George	Round 1	
Player of the Week	Suzy Batkovic	Round 4	
