= 2017–18 Melbourne Boomers season =

- Head Coach: Guy Molloy
- Captain: Jenna O'Hea
- Venue: State Basketball Centre

Results
- Record: 12–9
- Ladder: 4th
- Finals: Grand Final (defeated by Townsville, 1–2)

Leaders
- Points: Cambage (23.1)
- Rebounds: Cambage (10.4)
- Assists: O'Hea (4.5)

The 2017–18 Melbourne Boomers season is the 35th season for the franchise in the Women's National Basketball League (WNBL).

== Roster ==
2017–18 Melbourne Boomers roster
Players
Coaches

Pos.	No.	Nat.	Name	Ht.
C	2	(Australia)	Tomlinson, Louella	1.93 m (6 ft 4 in)
G	3	(United States)	Smart, Brittany	1.75 m (5 ft 9 in)
G	4	(Australia)	Cole, Rebecca	1.78 m (5 ft 10 in)
G	5	(Australia)	Burton, Kasey	1.84 m (6 ft 0 in)
G	6	(Australia)	Ott, Rebecca	1.82 m (6 ft 0 in)
G	7	(Australia)	Gould, Cassidy	1.76 m (5 ft 9 in)
C	8	(Australia)	Cambage, Liz	2.03 m (6 ft 8 in)
F	9	(Australia)	Kalka, Peri	1.85 m (6 ft 1 in)
G/F	11	(Australia)	O'Hea, Jenna (C)	1.87 m (6 ft 2 in)
G	12	(Australia)	D'Angelo, Chelsea	1.77 m (5 ft 10 in)
G	14	(Australia)	Conti, Monique	1.65 m (5 ft 5 in)
F	15	(Australia)	Grant, Ashleigh	1.88 m (6 ft 2 in)
G	23	(Australia)	Garrick, Madeleine	1.79 m (5 ft 10 in)
F	32	(New Zealand)	Purcell, Kalani	1.87 m (6 ft 2 in)
C	50	(United States)	Duever, Courtney (injured)	1.85 m (6 ft 1 in)

Head coach

- (Australia) Guy Molloy

Assistant coach(es)

- (Australia) Katrina Hibbert
- (Australia) Paul Flynn

Legend

- (C) Team captain
- (DP) Development player
- (I) Import player
- Injured

- Roster
Updated: 4 October 2017

== Standings ==
#	WNBL Championship ladder				
#	Team	W	L	PCT	GP
1	Perth Lynx	15	6	71.4	21
2	Sydney Uni Flames	14	7	66.6	21
3	Townsville Fire	14	7	66.6	21
4	Melbourne Boomers	12	9	57.1	21
5	Adelaide Lightning	11	10	52.3	21
6	Canberra Capitals	7	14	33.3	21
7	Dandenong Rangers	7	14	33.3	21
8	Bendigo Spirit	4	17	19.1	21

== Results ==
=== Pre-season ===
Game	Date	Team	Score	High points	High rebounds	High assists	Location	Record
1	September; 9	Invitational Team	90–76	O'Hea (16)	Purcell (8)	Cole (5)	Boardman Stadium	1–0
2	September; 15	Adelaide	61–80	–	–	–	Nunawading Basketball Centre	1–1
3	September; 16	Dandenong	79–75	Cole (19)	Purcell (10)	Cole (5)	Kilsyth Sports Centre	2–1
4	September; 22	Bendigo	72–73	Grant (31)	Purcell (9)	O'Hea (7)	MARS Minerdome	2–2

=== Regular season ===
Game	Date	Team	Score	High points	High rebounds	High assists	Location	Record
1	October; 5	@ Dandenong	76–61	Cambage (17)	O'Hea (11)	Purcell, Smart (4)	Dandenong Stadium	1–0
2	October; 7	Townsville	54–63	Cambage (15)	O'Hea (14)	Cole (4)	State Basketball Centre	1–1
3	October; 13	Bendigo	90–63	Cambage (25)	Cambage (14)	O'Hea (5)	Geelong Arena	2–1
4	October; 15	@ Canberra	92–63	Cambage (27)	Cambage (9)	Cole (5)	National Convention Centre	3–1
5	October; 21	Perth	79–77 (OT)	Cambage (23)	Cambage (23)	Cole (8)	State Basketball Centre	4–1
6	October; 27	@ Sydney	56–65	Cambage (19)	Purcell (8)	Conti, Purcell, Smart (3)	Brydens Stadium	4–2
7	October; 29	@ Townsville	57–64	Smart (16)	Cambage (6)	Tomlinson (3)	Townsville RSL Stadium	4–3
8	November; 4	@ Bendigo	66–71	Garrick (18)	Tomlinson (11)	Smart (5)	Bendigo Stadium	4–4
9	November; 6	Dandenong	60–57	Cambage (27)	Purcell (10)	Smart (6)	State Basketball Centre	5–4
10	November; 11	@ Sydney	88–65	O'Hea (22)	Purcell (10)	Purcell (6)	Brydens Stadium	6–4
11	November; 12	Adelaide	77–74	Cambage (44)	Cambage (12)	Cole, Smart (4)	State Basketball Centre	7–4
12	November; 18	Canberra	96–66	Cambage (32)	Purcell (12)	Purcell (5)	State Basketball Centre	8–4
13	November; 23	@ Townsville	66–73	O'Hea (13)	Purcell (11)	Purcell (6)	Townsville RSL Stadium	8–5
14	November; 26	Sydney	89–101	Cambage (22)	Cole, Purcell, Tomlinson (5)	Cambage (7)	State Basketball Centre	8–6
15	December; 2	Canberra	92–72	Cambage (38)	Cambage (13)	O'Hea (6)	State Basketball Centre	9–6
16	December; 7	Bendigo	86–42	O'Hea (18)	Cambage (12)	O'Hea (6)	State Basketball Centre	10–6
17	December; 9	@ Adelaide	64–62	Cambage (32)	Cambage, Purcell (11)	Cole, O'Hea, Smart (4)	Titanium Security Arena	11–6
18	December; 17	Perth	89–92	Cambage (38)	Cambage (15)	O'Hea (7)	State Basketball Centre	11–7
19	December; 21	@ Adelaide	56–67	Cambage (21)	Cambage (17)	O'Hea (5)	Titanium Security Arena	11–8
20	December; 23	@ Perth	66–84	O'Hea (15)	Purcell (13)	O'Hea (6)	Bendat Basketball Centre	11–9
21	December; 30	Dandenong	80–45	Cambage (20)	Purcell (10)	Garrick (4)	State Basketball Centre	12–9

=== Finals ===
==== Semi-finals ====
Game	Date	Team	Score	High points	High rebounds	High assists	Location	Series
1	January; 3	Perth	92–76	Cole (21)	Cambage (9)	O'Hea (11)	State Basketball Centre	1–0
2	January; 5	@ Perth	78–69	Cambage (25)	Cambage (15)	Purcell (6)	Bendat Basketball Centre	2–0

==== Grand Final ====
Game	Date	Team	Score	High points	High rebounds	High assists	Location	Series
1	January; 13	@ Townsville	64–69	Cambage (26)	Cambage (13)	O'Hea, Purcell (4)	Townsville RSL Stadium	0–1
2	January; 18	Townsville	58–57	Cambage (19)	Purcell (10)	Cole, O'Hea (3)	State Basketball Centre	1–1
3	January; 21	@ Townsville	57–70	Cambage (18)	Cambage (9)	O'Hea (6)	Townsville RSL Stadium	1–2

== Signings ==
=== Returning ===
Player	Signed	Contract
Monique Conti	March 2017	1-year contract
Brittany Smart	March 2017	1-year contract
Madeleine Garrick	March 2017	1-year contract
Rebecca Ott	March 2017	1-year contract
Rebecca Cole	March 2017	1-year contract

=== Incoming ===
Player	Signed	Contract
Jenna O'Hea	9 March 2017	2-year contract
Liz Cambage	3 May 2017	1-year contract
Louella Tomlinson	3 May 2017	1-year contract
Kalani Purcell	7 June 2017	2-year contract
Courtney Duever	28 June 2017	1-year contract
Ashleigh Grant	31 August 2017	1-year development player contract

== Awards ==
=== In-season ===
Award	Recipient	Round(s) / Date	Ref.
Team of the Week	Liz Cambage	Rounds: 2, 3, 5, 6, 9, 10, 11	
Team of the Week	Jenna O'Hea	Round 6	
Player of the Week	Liz Cambage	Rounds: 3, 5, 6, 9	
