= 2017–18 Sydney Uni Flames season =

- Head Coach: Cheryl Chambers
- Captain: Belinda Snell
- Venue: Brydens Stadium

Results
- Record: 14–7
- Ladder: 2nd
- Finals: Semi-finals (defeated by Townsville, 0–2)

Leaders
- Points: Taylor (18.8)
- Rebounds: Hamson (9.7)
- Assists: Snell (5.3)

The 2017–18 Sydney Uni Flames season is the 38th season for the franchise in the Women's National Basketball League (WNBL).

== Roster ==
2017–18 Sydney Uni Flames roster
Players
Coaches

Pos.	No.	Nat.	Name	Ht.
G	2	(Australia)	Walmsley, Susannah	1.70 m (5 ft 7 in)
G	3	(Australia)	Moffatt, Hayley	1.76 m (5 ft 9 in)
G	4	(Australia)	Tupaea, Tahlia (injured)	1.75 m (5 ft 9 in)
C	5	(United States)	Hamson, Jennifer	2.00 m (6 ft 7 in)
F	6	(Australia)	McLean, Cassidy	1.78 m (5 ft 10 in)
G	7	(Australia)	Wilson, Alex	1.80 m (5 ft 11 in)
F	8	(Australia)	Greaves, Shanae	1.85 m (6 ft 1 in)
G	10	(Australia)	Ebzery, Katie-Rae	1.78 m (5 ft 10 in)
F	11	(Australia)	Boag, Carly	1.88 m (6 ft 2 in)
G	12	(Australia)	Snell, Belinda (C)	1.80 m (5 ft 11 in)
F	14	(Australia)	McSpadden, Lara	1.94 m (6 ft 4 in)
F	31	(United States)	Taylor, Asia	1.85 m (6 ft 1 in)
G	44	(Australia)	Graham, Sarah	1.63 m (5 ft 4 in)

Head coach

- (Australia) Cheryl Chambers

Assistant coach(es)

- (Australia) Karen Dalton

Legend

- (C) Team captain
- (DP) Development player
- (I) Import player
- Injured

- Roster
Updated: 21 December 2017

== Standings ==
#	WNBL Championship ladder				
#	Team	W	L	PCT	GP
1	Perth Lynx	15	6	71.4	21
2	Sydney Uni Flames	14	7	66.6	21
3	Townsville Fire	14	7	66.6	21
4	Melbourne Boomers	12	9	57.1	21
5	Adelaide Lightning	11	10	52.3	21
6	Canberra Capitals	7	14	33.3	21
7	Dandenong Rangers	7	14	33.3	21
8	Bendigo Spirit	4	17	19.1	21

== Results ==
=== Pre-season ===
Game	Date	Team	Score	High points	High rebounds	High assists	Location	Record
1	September; 11	Fujitsu Red Wave	74–63	Snell (19)	–	–	Brydens Stadium	1–0
2	September; 12	Fujitsu Red Wave	81–84	Ebzery (19)	Boag (11)	–	Brydens Stadium	1–1
3	September; 23	Canberra	72–69	Wilson (20)	–	–	Brydens Stadium	2–1

=== Regular season ===
Game	Date	Team	Score	High points	High rebounds	High assists	Location	Record
1	October; 6	@ Adelaide	80–91	Ebzery (20)	Taylor (10)	Ebzery (7)	Titanium Security Arena	0–1
2	October; 8	@ Perth	93–80	Hamson, Taylor (20)	Hamson, Taylor (9)	Snell (9)	Bendat Basketball Centre	1–1
3	October; 14	Dandenong	70–65	Taylor (17)	Taylor (11)	Ebzery (5)	Brydens Stadium	2–1
4	October; 19	@ Townsville	66–63	Ebzery (20)	Taylor (9)	Snell (5)	Townsville RSL Stadium	3–1
5	October; 27	Melbourne	65–56	Taylor (27)	Taylor (15)	Ebzery (4)	Brydens Stadium	4–1
6	October; 29	@ Dandenong	68–70	Taylor (24)	Snell (10)	Taylor, Wilson (5)	Dandenong Stadium	4–2
7	November; 2	Canberra	81–62	Taylor (18)	Hamson, Snell, Taylor (10)	Snell (4)	Brydens Stadium	5–2
8	November; 4	@ Canberra	81–72	Taylor (29)	Hamson (14)	Snell (8)	National Convention Centre	6–2
9	November; 9	@ Bendigo	105–75	Ebzery (26)	Hamson (11)	Wilson (7)	Bendigo Stadium	7–2
10	November; 11	Melbourne	65–88	Taylor (23)	Taylor (8)	Ebzery (5)	Brydens Stadium	7–3
11	November; 19	@ Perth	71–83	Taylor (31)	Taylor (9)	Ebzery (7)	Bendat Basketball Centre	7–4
12	November; 26	@ Melbourne	101–89	Taylor (29)	Greaves, Taylor, Wilson (6)	Ebzery (10)	State Basketball Centre	8–4
13	November; 29	Adelaide	74–77	Hamson (25)	Hamson (17)	Snell (4)	Brydens Stadium	8–5
14	December; 2	Townsville	85–88	Ebzery (21)	Hamson (9)	Snell (6)	Brydens Stadium	8–6
15	December; 7	@ Canberra	73–67	Ebzery, Wilson (17)	Hamson (17)	Snell (9)	National Convention Centre	9–6
16	December; 9	Perth	79–84	Wilson (22)	Hamson (16)	Ebzery (11)	Qudos Bank Arena	9–7
17	December; 14	@ Dandenong	70–65	Snell (20)	Hamson (14)	Wilson (5)	Dandenong Stadium	10–7
18	December; 16	Bendigo	90–57	Wilson (21)	Hamson (10)	Snell (9)	Brydens Stadium	11–7
19	December; 23	Adelaide	104–97 (OT)	Taylor (35)	Hamson (10)	Snell (9)	Brydens Stadium	12–7
20	December; 29	Townsville	107–81	Hamson (24)	Taylor (11)	Snell (10)	Brydens Stadium	13–7
21	December; 31	@ Bendigo	75–63	Taylor (15)	Hamson (10)	Ebzery (6)	Bendigo Stadium	14–7

=== Finals ===
==== Semifinals ====
Game	Date	Team	Score	High points	High rebounds	High assists	Location	Series
1	January; 4	@ Townsville	49–78	Snell (11)	Hamson (10)	Snell, Taylor (3)	Townsville RSL Stadium	0–1
2	January; 6	Townsville	65–68	Taylor (18)	Hamson (15)	Snell (7)	Brydens Stadium	0–2

== Signings ==
=== Returning ===
Player	Signed	Contract
Belinda Snell	September 2016	existing 2-year contract
Shanae Greaves	September 2016	existing 2-year contract
Alex Wilson	29 March 2017	1-year contract
Tahlia Tupaea	18 April 2017	2-year contract
Jennifer Hamson	9 May 2017	1-year contract
Carly Boag	12 June 2017	1-year contract
Sarah Graham	23 July 2017	1-year contract
Asia Taylor	3 August 2017	1-year contract
Cassidy McLean	22 August 2017	1-year contract
Lara McSpadden	22 August 2017	1-year contract
Susannah Walmsley	22 August 2017	1-year contract

=== Incoming ===
Player	Signed	Contract
Katie-Rae Ebzery	25 May 2017	1-year contract

== Awards ==
=== In-season ===
Award	Recipient	Round(s) / Date	Ref.
Team of the Week	Belinda Snell	Rounds: 1, 8, 10	
Team of the Week	Katie-Rae Ebzery	Rounds: 3, 6, 12	
Team of the Week	Asia Taylor	Rounds: 4, 5, 7, 8, 12, 13	
Team of the Week	Jennifer Hamson	Rounds: 5, 11, 13	
Player of the Week	Belinda Snell	Round 8	
Player of the Week	Asia Taylor	Round 12	
Player of the Week	Jennifer Hamson	Round 13	
