= Courtney Duever =

American basketball player

Personal information
- Born: December 27, 1991 (age 34) Austin, Texas
- Listed height: 6 ft 1 in (1.85 m)

Career information
- High school: Westlake (Austin, Texas)
- College: Central Arkansas (2010–2014)
- WNBA draft: 2014: undrafted
- Playing career: 2014–present
- Position: Forward / Center

Career history
- 2014–2015: Montana 2003
- 2017: Melbourne Boomers

Career highlights
- Southland Player of the Year (2014); Southland All-Defensive Team (2014); First-team All-Southland (2014); 2013-14 Southland All-Defense

Courtney Duever (born December 27, 1991) is an American professional basketball player.

== Career ==
=== College ===
Duever played college basketball at the University of Central Arkansas in Conway, Arkansas for the Sugar Bears in the Southland Conference of NCAA Division I.

=== Central Arkansas statistics ===
Legend
GP	Games played	GS	Games started	MPG	Minutes per game
FG%	Field goal percentage	3P%	3-point field goal percentage	FT%	Free throw percentage
RPG	Rebounds per game	APG	Assists per game	SPG	Steals per game
BPG	Blocks per game	PPG	Points per game	**Bold**	Career high

Year	Team	GP	Points	FG%	3P%	FT%	RPG	APG	SPG	BPG	PPG
2010–11	Central Arkansas	**33**	247	41.3%	28.3%	47.2%	4.8	1.0	**1.4**	0.8	7.5
2011–12	Central Arkansas	31	245	43.0%	28.6%	67.2%	5.7	1.0	1.2	0.4	7.9
2012–13	Central Arkansas	30	407	**48.3%**	**37.1%**	**77.5%**	8.8	1.0	1.0	0.9	13.6
2013–14	Central Arkansas	30	**449**	47.8%	21.7%	74.2%	**9.2**	**1.7**	1.3	**1.0**	**15.0**
Career		124	1348	45.6%	29.4%	68.9%	7.1	1.2	1.2	0.8	10.9

=== Europe ===
After her college career, Duever began her professional career with Montana 2003 in the Bulgarian Women's Basketball Championship. There, she averaged 17.6 points and 9.1 rebounds per game.

=== Australia ===
After impressive showings for the Sunbury Jets in the semi-professional Big V competition, Duever has been signed by the Melbourne Boomers for the 2017–18 WNBL season. This will be the highest level of competition in her career. Duever will play under Guy Molloy, alongside the likes of Liz Cambage & Jenna O'Hea.
