= 2017–18 WNBL season =

- League: Women's National Basketball League
- Sport: Basketball
- Duration: 5 October 2017 – 21 January 2018
- Teams: 8
- TV partner: Fox Sports

Regular season
- Top seed: Perth Lynx
- Season MVP: Suzy Batkovic (TSV)
- Top scorer: Liz Cambage (MEL)

Finals
- Champions: Townsville Fire
- Runners-up: Melbourne Boomers
- Finals MVP: Suzy Batkovic (TSV)

WNBL seasons
- ← 2016–17 2018–19 →

The 2017–18 WNBL season was the 38th season of the competition since its establishment in 1981. The regular season began on 5 October 2017, with the Melbourne Boomers visiting the Dandenong Rangers. The Sydney Uni Flames were the defending champions but were defeated in the semi-finals by Townsville. The Townsville Fire took home their third WNBL championship after defeating Melbourne, 2–0.

This season sees the return to television, with Fox Sports broadcasting the WNBL for the first time since 2015. Spalding once again provided equipment including the official game ball, whilst iAthletic took over supplying team apparel.

== Standings ==
#	WNBL Championship ladder				
#	Team	W	L	PCT	GP
1	Perth Lynx	15	6	71.4	21
2	Sydney Uni Flames	14	7	66.6	21
3	Townsville Fire	14	7	66.6	21
4	Melbourne Boomers	12	9	57.1	21
5	Adelaide Lightning	11	10	52.3	21
6	Canberra Capitals	7	14	33.3	21
7	Dandenong Rangers	7	14	33.3	21
8	Bendigo Spirit	4	17	19.1	21

== Finals ==
Semifinals
1	Perth Lynx	0
4	Melbourne Boomers	2
3	Townsville Fire	2
2	Sydney Uni Flames	0

Grand Final
4	Melbourne Boomers	1
3	Townsville Fire	2

== Statistics ==
=== Individual statistic leaders ===
Category	Player	Statistic
Points per game	Liz Cambage (MEL)	23.7 PPG
Rebounds per game	Liz Cambage (MEL)	10.4 RPG
Assists per game	Natalie Hurst (CAN)	6.7 APG
Steals per game	Sami Whitcomb (PER)	2.5 SPG
Blocks per game	Jennifer Hamson (SYD)	2.6 BPG

=== Individual game highs ===
Category	Player	Statistic
Points	Liz Cambage (MEL)	44
Rebounds	Liz Cambage (MEL)	23
Assists	Natalie Hurst (CAN)	14
Steals	Natalie Novosel (ADL)	8
Blocks	Jennifer Hamson (SYD)	7

== Awards ==
=== Player of the Week ===
Round #	Player	Ref.
Round 1	Cayla George (TSV)	
Round 2	Abby Bishop (ADL)	
Round 3	Liz Cambage (MEL)	
Round 4	Suzy Batkovic (TSV)	
Round 5	Liz Cambage (MEL) (2)	
Round 6	Liz Cambage (MEL) (3)	
Round 7	Courtney Williams (PER)	
Round 8	Belinda Snell (SYD)	
Round 9	Liz Cambage (MEL) (4)	
Round 10	Sami Whitcomb (PER)	
Round 11	Courtney Williams (PER) (2)	
Round 12	Asia Taylor (SYD)	
Round 13	Jennifer Hamson (SYD)	

=== Team of the Week ===
Round #	Team				
Round 1	Natalie Hurst (CAN)	Belinda Snell (SYD)	Natalie Novosel (ADL)	Jordan Hooper (CAN)	Cayla George (TSV)
Round 2	Nicole Seekamp (ADL)	Nadeen Payne (BEN)	Abby Bishop (ADL)	Suzy Batkovic (TSV)	Liz Cambage (MEL)
Round 3	Katie-Rae Ebzery (SYD)	Colleen Planeta (ADL)	Sara Blicavs (DAN)	Carley Mijović (DAN)	Liz Cambage (MEL) (2)
Round 4	Natalie Novosel (ADL) (2)	Sami Whitcomb (PER)	Asia Taylor (SYD)	Abby Bishop (ADL) (2)	Suzy Batkovic (TSV) (2)
Round 5	Rachel Banham (BEN)	Alice Kunek (PER)	Asia Taylor (SYD) (2)	Jennifer Hamson (SYD)	Liz Cambage (MEL) (3)
Round 6	Courtney Williams (PER)	Katie-Rae Ebzery (SYD) (2)	Jenna O'Hea (MEL)	Kayla Pedersen (DAN)	Liz Cambage (MEL) (4)
Round 7	Courtney Williams (PER) (2)	Tessa Lavey (DAN)	Micaela Cocks (TSV)	Asia Taylor (SYD) (3)	Suzy Batkovic (TSV) (3)
Round 8	Courtney Williams (PER) (3)	Sami Whitcomb (PER) (2)	Belinda Snell (SYD) (2)	Asia Taylor (SYD) (4)	Betnijah Laney (BEN)
Round 9	Courtney Williams (PER) (4)	Sami Whitcomb (PER) (3)	Carley Mijović (DAN) (2)	Suzy Batkovic (TSV) (4)	Liz Cambage (MEL) (5)
Round 10	Courtney Williams (PER) (5)	Sami Whitcomb (PER) (4)	Belinda Snell (SYD) (3)	Suzy Batkovic (TSV) (5)	Liz Cambage (MEL) (6)
Round 11	Courtney Williams (PER) (6)	Sami Whitcomb (PER) (5)	Jennifer Hamson (SYD) (2)	Suzy Batkovic (TSV) (6)	Liz Cambage (MEL) (7)
Round 12	Courtney Williams (PER) (7)	Katie-Rae Ebzery (SYD) (3)	Asia Taylor (SYD) (5)	Abby Bishop (ADL) (3)	Darcee Garbin (TSV)
Round 13	Nicole Seekamp (ADL) (2)	Brittany Smart (MEL)	Asia Taylor (SYD) (6)	Jordan Hooper (CAN) (2)	Jennifer Hamson (SYD) (3)

=== Postseason Awards ===
Award	Winner	Position	Team
Most Valuable Player	Suzy Batkovic	Center	Townsville Fire
Grand Final MVP	Suzy Batkovic	Center	Townsville Fire
Rookie of the Year	Ezi Magbegor	Forward	Canberra Capitals
Defensive Player of the Year	Kayla Pedersen	Forward	Dandenong Rangers
Top Shooter Award	Liz Cambage	Center	Melbourne Boomers
Coach of the Year	Andy Stewart	Coach	Perth Lynx
All-Star Five	Courtney Williams	Guard	Perth Lynx
All-Star Five	Sami Whitcomb	Guard	Perth Lynx
All-Star Five	Asia Taylor	Forward	Sydney Uni Flames
All-Star Five	Suzy Batkovic	Center	Townsville Fire
All-Star Five	Liz Cambage	Center	Melbourne Boomers

== Team captains and coaches ==
Team	Captain	Coach
Adelaide Lightning	Abby Bishop	Chris Lucas
Bendigo Spirit	Kelsey Griffin	Simon Pritchard
Canberra Capitals	Natalie Hurst	Paul Goriss
Dandenong Rangers	Stephanie Blicavs	Larissa Anderson
Melbourne Boomers	Jenna O'Hea	Guy Molloy
Perth Lynx	Antonia Farnworth / Sami Whitcomb (co)	Andy Stewart
Sydney Uni Flames	Belinda Snell	Cheryl Chambers
Townsville Fire	Suzy Batkovic	Claudia Brassard
