= Laurin Mincy =

American basketball player

Personal information
- Born: February 3, 1992 (age 34) Newark, New Jersey, U.S.
- Listed height: 6 ft 0 in (1.83 m)
- Listed weight: 160 lb (73 kg)

Career information
- High school: University (Newark, New Jersey)
- College: Maryland (2010–2015)
- WNBA draft: 2015: 3rd round, 27th overall pick
- Drafted by: New York Liberty
- Playing career: 2015–present
- Position: Guard
- Number: 1

Career history
- 2015–2016: Electra Ramat Hasharon
- 2016–2017: Hapoel Rishon LeZion
- 2017–2018: Townsville Fire
- 2022-present: Athletes Unlimited Pro Basketball

Career highlights
- McDonald's All-American (2010)
- Stats at Basketball Reference

Laurin Mincy (born February 3, 1992) is an American professional women's basketball player.

== Career ==
=== High school ===
In her first year at University High in Newark, Micy became the first freshman ever named to New Jersey All-State team and in the same year led University High School to its first state title. She played in the McDonald's All-American Game in 2010 after her senior year being a two-time New Jersey Star-Ledger Player of the Year (2008, '09) 2009 New Jersey Gatorade Player of the Year. She was also named a "Girl Athlete to Remember" by NJ.com as one of the best of the decade and was two-time first team All-Tri State, Three-time All-County, three-time All-Conference and the 2007 Essex County Player of the Year, along with two state championships.

=== College ===
Mincy played college basketball at the University of Maryland in College Park, Maryland for the Terrapins in the Big Ten Conference of NCAA Division I. In five years with Maryland, she averaged 9.6 Points Per Game.

=== Israel ===
After her college career, Mincy began her professional career with Electra Ramat Hasharon in Israel's Ligat ha'Al, for the 2015–16 season. There, she averaged 15.9 points and 3.3 assists per game. For the 2016–17 season, Mincy remained in Israel, signing with Hapoel Rishon LeZion. However, Mincy left the team after just four games.

=== Australia ===
Mincy signed with the Townsville Fire for the 2017–18 WNBL season. Mincy played alongside Claudia Brassard, Suzy Batkovic and Cayla George and ended up winning the WNBL Championship in 2017

=== Athletes Unlimited ===
In 2021, Mincy signed to play for Athletes Unlimited Pro Basketball, which ran from January 26 through February 26, 2022 in Las Vegas. The league takes place over five weeks and there are no set rosters, instead captains pick their new teams each week. This model allows for players to have more options and also for fans to directly impact and interact with the games and teams.

== Career statistics ==
Legend
GP	Games played	GS	Games started	MPG	Minutes per game	RPG	Rebounds per game
APG	Assists per game	SPG	Steals per game	BPG	Blocks per game	PPG	Points per game
TO	Turnovers per game	FG%	Field-goal percentage	3P%	3-point field-goal percentage	FT%	Free-throw percentage
**Bold**	Career best	°	League leader

=== College ===
Year	Team	GP	GS	MPG	FG%	3P%	FT%	RPG	APG	SPG	BPG	TO	PPG
2010–11	Maryland	31	1	16.4	38.2	27.4	73.1	2.3	0.8	0.5	0.4	1.4	4.9
2011–12	Maryland	36	35	**32.3**	43.6	**40.0**	80.9	**4.5**	2.1	**0.9**	0.4	1.9	13.1
2012–13	Maryland	5	5	25.4	**44.4**	38.5	85.7	4.4	**3.8**	0.6	**1.2**	2.4	8.6
2013–14	Maryland	34	9	17.1	39.2	28.6	76.4	2.4	1.7	0.8	0.1	**1.4**	6.3
2014–15	Maryland	**37**	**37**	30.3	44.3	38.5	**86.1**	4.0	3.4	0.8	0.2	2.4	**13.5**
**Career**		143	87	24.5	42.4	35.6	81.7	3.4	2.1	0.7	0.3	1.8	9.6
Statistics retrieved from Sports-Reference.
