= 2017–18 Adelaide Lightning season =

National Basketball League team season

- Head Coach: Chris Lucas
- Captain: Abby Bishop
- Venue: Titanium Security Arena

Results
- Record: 11–10
- Ladder: 5th
- Finals: Did not qualify

Leaders
- Points: Bishop (15.7)
- Rebounds: Bishop (9.2)
- Assists: Seekamp (5.1)

The 2017–18 Adelaide Lightning season is the 26th season of the franchise in the Women's National Basketball League (WNBL).

== Roster ==
2017–18 Adelaide Lightning roster
Players
Coaches

Pos.	No.	Nat.	Name	Ht.
G	1	(Australia)	Nicholson, Lauren	1.80 m (5 ft 11 in)
F/C	4	(Australia)	Bishop, Abby (C)	1.89 m (6 ft 2 in)
G	5	(Australia)	Clydesdale, Aimie	1.78 m (5 ft 10 in)
G	6	(Australia)	McKay, Shannon	1.69 m (5 ft 7 in)
G	7	(Australia)	Elsworthy, Sarah	1.71 m (5 ft 7 in)
F/C	8	(Australia)	Brook, Chelsea	1.88 m (6 ft 2 in)
G	9	(Australia)	Panousis, Vanessa	1.70 m (5 ft 7 in)
F	10	(Australia)	Hodges, Laura	1.88 m (6 ft 2 in)
G/F	12	(Australia)	Good, Jessica	1.85 m (6 ft 1 in)
G	21	(United States)	Novosel, Natalie (injured)	1.80 m (5 ft 11 in)
G	35	(Australia)	Seekamp, Nicole	1.78 m (5 ft 10 in)
F	42	(United States)	Planeta, Colleen	1.88 m (6 ft 2 in)
C	44	(Canada)	Hamblin, Ruth	1.98 m (6 ft 6 in)

Head coach

- (Australia) Chris Lucas

Assistant coach(es)

- (Australia) Jason Chainey
- (Australia) Rachael Sporn
- (Australia) Marcus Wong

Legend

- (C) Team captain
- (DP) Development player
- (I) Import player
- Injured

- Roster
Updated: 21 December 2017

== Standings ==
#	WNBL Championship ladder				
#	Team	W	L	PCT	GP
1	Perth Lynx	15	6	71.4	21
2	Sydney Uni Flames	14	7	66.6	21
3	Townsville Fire	14	7	66.6	21
4	Melbourne Boomers	12	9	57.1	21
5	Adelaide Lightning	11	10	52.3	21
6	Canberra Capitals	7	14	33.3	21
7	Dandenong Rangers	7	14	33.3	21
8	Bendigo Spirit	4	17	19.1	21

== Results ==
=== Pre-season ===
Game	Date	Team	Score	High points	High rebounds	High assists	Location	Record
1	September; 15	@ Melbourne	80–61	–	–	–	Nunawading Basketball Centre	1–0
2	September; 16	@ Bendigo	76–74	–	–	–	Boardman Stadium	2–0

=== Regular season ===
Game	Date	Team	Score	High points	High rebounds	High assists	Location	Record
1	October; 6	Sydney	91–80	Novosel (21)	Hamblin, Novosel (8)	Novosel (9)	Titanium Security Arena	1–0
2	October; 8	@ Canberra	77–84	Bishop (21)	Hamblin (13)	Novosel (8)	National Convention Centre	1–1
3	October; 12	Perth	89–81	Bishop (35)	Nicholson (12)	Seekamp (7)	Titanium Security Arena	2–1
4	October; 21	Bendigo	79–75	Planeta (21)	Bishop (11)	Novosel, Seekamp (6)	Titanium Security Arena	3–1
5	October; 25	Canberra	80–77	Bishop (21)	Bishop (12)	Seekamp (6)	Titanium Security Arena	4–1
6	October; 27	@ Bendigo	79–66	Planeta (18)	Hamblin (18)	Novosel (8)	Bendigo Stadium	5–1
7	November; 2	Dandenong	81–83	Seekamp (18)	Bishop (10)	Novosel (5)	Titanium Security Arena	5–2
8	November; 5	@ Townsville	42–84	Bishop (11)	Novosel (7)	Bishop, Seekamp (3)	Townsville RSL Stadium	5–3
9	November; 10	@ Dandenong	69–63	Bishop (15)	Bishop (12)	Novosel (4)	Dandenong Stadium	6–3
10	November; 12	@ Melbourne	74–77	Novosel (19)	Bishop (9)	Seekamp (6)	State Basketball Centre	6–4
11	November; 18	Townsville	78–101	Bishop (24)	Bishop (13)	Seekamp (5)	Titanium Security Arena	6–5
12	November; 25	Dandenong	70–49	Seekamp (15)	Bishop (12)	Bishop, Seekamp (5)	State Basketball Centre	7–5
13	November; 29	@ Sydney	77–74	Seekamp (22)	Bishop (10)	Novosel (7)	Brydens Stadium	8–5
14	December; 2	Perth	74–89	Seekamp (14)	Bishop (11)	Bishop, Novosel (5)	Titanium Security Arena	8–6
15	December; 7	@ Townsville	89–74	Novosel (21)	Bishop, Hamblin; Seekamp (9)	Clydesdale, Novosel, Seekamp (4)	Townsville RSL Stadium	9–6
16	December; 9	Melbourne	62–64	Seekamp (16)	Bishop (14)	Seekamp (6)	Titanium Security Arena	9–7
17	December; 15	@ Perth	82–99	Bishop (20)	Bishop (7)	Seekamp (7)	Bendat Basketball Centre	9–8
18	December; 17	@ Canberra	87–88	Clydesdale, Planeta (18)	Planeta (6)	Nicholson, Seekamp (6)	National Convention Centre	9–9
19	December; 21	Melbourne	67–56	Bishop (22)	Bishop (8)	Seekamp (7)	Titanium Security Arena	10–9
20	December; 23	@ Sydney	97–104 (OT)	Clydesdale (28)	Bishop (14)	Bishop (8)	Brydens Stadium	10–10
21	December; 29	Bendigo	87–74	Hamblin (23)	Bishop, Hamblin (9)	Seekamp (6)	Titanium Security Arena	11–10

== Signings ==
=== Returning ===
Player	Signed	Contract
Sarah Elsworthy	14 March 2017	1-year contract
Chelsea Brook	9 April 2017	1-year contract
Laura Hodges	15 June 2017	1-year contract
Jessica Good	13 September 2017	1-year contract
Shannon McKay	13 September 2017	1-year contract
Colleen Planeta	TBC	TBC

=== Incoming ===
Player	Signed	Contract
Aimie Clydesdale	27 April 2017	2-year contract
Natalie Novosel	8 May 2017	2-year contract
Nicole Seekamp	10 May 2017	1-year contract
Ruth Hamblin	17 May 2017	1-year contract
Lauren Nicholson	19 May 2017	1-year contract
Abby Bishop	22 June 2017	1-year contract
Vanessa Panousis	18 July 2017	1-year contract

== Awards ==
=== In-season ===
Award	Recipient	Round(s) / Date	Ref.
Team of the Week	Natalie Novosel	Rounds: 1, 4	
Team of the Week	Abby Bishop	Rounds: 2, 4, 12	
Team of the Week	Nicole Seekamp	Round 2	
Team of the Week	Colleen Planeta	Round 3	
Player of the Week	Abby Bishop	Round 2	
