= 2017–18 Dandenong Rangers season =

- Head Coach: Larissa Anderson
- Captain: Stephanie Blicavs
- Venue: Dandenong Stadium

Results
- Record: 7–14
- Ladder: 7th
- Finals: Did not qualify

Leaders
- Points: St. Blicavs (15.1)
- Rebounds: Pedersen (8.3)
- Assists: Palau (4.6)

The 2017–18 Dandenong Rangers season is the 26th season for the franchise in the Women's National Basketball League (WNBL).

== Roster ==
2017–18 Dandenong Rangers roster
Players
Coaches

| Pos. | No. | Nat. | Name | Ht. |
|---|---|---|---|---|
| F | 2 | (United States) | Pedersen, Kayla | 1.93 m (6 ft 4 in) |
| G | 5 | (Australia) | Lavey, Tessa | 1.72 m (5 ft 8 in) |
| G | 6 | (Australia) | Antoniadou, Rachel | 1.73 m (5 ft 8 in) |
| F | 7 | (Australia) | Pizzey, Rebecca | 1.90 m (6 ft 3 in) |
| G | 8 | (Australia) | Blicavs, Stephanie (C) | 1.78 m (5 ft 10 in) |
| G | 9 | (Spain) | Palau, Laia | 1.80 m (5 ft 11 in) |
| F | 10 | (Australia) | Rowe, Kiera | 1.80 m (5 ft 11 in) |
| F | 11 | (Australia) | Mijović, Carley | 1.96 m (6 ft 5 in) |
| G | 13 | (Australia) | Richards, Samantha | 1.70 m (5 ft 7 in) |
| G | 14 | (Australia) | Todhunter, Amelia | 1.69 m (5 ft 7 in) |
| F | 15 | (Australia) | Blicavs, Sara (injured) | 1.89 m (6 ft 2 in) |
| C | 22 | (Australia) | Roberts, Tayla | 1.91 m (6 ft 3 in) |

Head coach

- (Australia) Larissa Anderson

Assistant coach(es)

- (New Zealand) Kennedy Kereama
- (Australia) Samantha Richards
- (Australia) John White

Legend

- (C) Team captain
- (DP) Development player
- (I) Import player
- Injured

- Roster
Updated: 13 December 2017

== Standings ==
| # | WNBL Championship ladder | | | | |
| # | Team | W | L | PCT | GP |
|---|---|---|---|---|---|
| 1 | Perth Lynx | 15 | 6 | 71.4 | 21 |
| 2 | Sydney Uni Flames | 14 | 7 | 66.6 | 21 |
| 3 | Townsville Fire | 14 | 7 | 66.6 | 21 |
| 4 | Melbourne Boomers | 12 | 9 | 57.1 | 21 |
| 5 | Adelaide Lightning | 11 | 10 | 52.3 | 21 |
| 6 | Canberra Capitals | 7 | 14 | 33.3 | 21 |
| 7 | Dandenong Rangers | 7 | 14 | 33.3 | 21 |
| 8 | Bendigo Spirit | 4 | 17 | 19.1 | 21 |

== Results ==
=== Pre-season ===
| Game | Date | Team | Score | High points | High rebounds | High assists | Location | Record |
|---|---|---|---|---|---|---|---|---|
| 1 | September; 16 | Melbourne | 75–79 | Sa. Blicavs (24) | Mijović (11) | St. Blicavs (4) | Kilsyth Sports Centre | 0–1 |
| 2 | September; 17 | Bendigo | 62–68 | – | – | – | Eagle Stadium | 0–2 |

=== Regular season ===
| Game | Date | Team | Score | High points | High rebounds | High assists | Location | Record |
|---|---|---|---|---|---|---|---|---|
| 1 | October; 5 | Melbourne | 61–76 | Sa. Blicavs (17) | Pedersen (11) | St. Blicavs (6) | Dandenong Stadium | 0–1 |
| 2 | October; 14 | @ Sydney | 65–70 | Pedersen (19) | Pedersen (9) | Lavey, Pedersen (4) | Brydens Stadium | 0–2 |
| 3 | October; 21 | Townsville | 86–71 | Mijović (28) | Pedersen (13) | Lavey (7) | Dandenong Stadium | 1–2 |
| 4 | October; 22 | @ Canberra | 77–76 | Sa. Blicavs (24) | Pedersen (12) | Sa. Blicavs (6) | National Convention Centre | 2–2 |
| 5 | October; 27 | @ Perth | 78–88 | St. Blicavs (24) | Pedersen (10) | St. Blicavs (6) | Bendat Basketball Centre | 2–3 |
| 6 | October; 29 | Sydney | 70–68 | St. Blicavs (14) | Roberts (11) | St. Blicavs, Lavey (5) | Dandenong Stadium | 3–3 |
| 7 | November; 2 | @ Adelaide | 83–81 | Roberts (16) | Sa. Blicavs, Pedersen (9) | Sa. Blicavs (8) | Titanium Security Arena | 4–3 |
| 8 | November; 6 | @ Melbourne | 57–60 | St. Blicavs (13) | Pedersen (9) | St. Blicavs (4) | State Basketball Centre | 4–4 |
| 9 | November; 10 | Adelaide | 63–69 | Mijović (17) | Pedersen (12) | Pedersen (6) | Dandenong Stadium | 4–5 |
| 10 | November; 19 | Bendigo | 80–70 | St. Blicavs, Lavey (19) | Mijović (8) | Palau (9) | Traralgon Sports Stadium | 5–5 |
| 11 | November; 23 | Perth | 62–74 | St. Blicavs (17) | Lavey (7) | Palau (6) | Dandenong Stadium | 5–6 |
| 12 | November; 25 | Adelaide | 49–70 | St. Blicavs (14) | Pedersen (8) | Palau (5) | State Basketball Centre | 5–7 |
| 13 | November; 29 | Townsville | 78–59 | Mijović (18) | Mijović (16) | Lavey, Palau (5) | Dandenong Stadium | 6–7 |
| 14 | December; 2 | @ Bendigo | 75–67 | St. Blicavs (19) | Pedersen (10) | Palau (7) | Bendigo Stadium | 7–7 |
| 15 | December; 7 | @ Perth | 73–78 | Pedersen (19) | Pedersen (10) | Palau, Pedersen (5) | Bendat Basketball Centre | 7–8 |
| 16 | December; 9 | Canberra | 78–81 | St. Blicavs (29) | Pedersen (8) | St. Blicavs, Richards (5) | Dandenong Stadium | 7–9 |
| 17 | December; 14 | Sydney | 65–70 | St. Blicavs (16) | Mijović (10) | Pedersen (5) | Dandenong Stadium | 7–10 |
| 18 | December; 16 | @ Townsville | 71–83 | Mijović (22) | Pedersen, Roberts (7) | St. Blicavs (5) | Townsville RSL Stadium | 7–11 |
| 19 | December; 21 | @ Bendigo | 47–64 | Mijović, Roberts (12) | Mijović (11) | Richards, Rowe (3) | Bendigo Stadium | 7–12 |
| 20 | December; 23 | Canberra | 59–63 | St. Blicavs (17) | St. Blicavs, Mijović (7) | St. Blicavs (5) | Dandenong Stadium | 7–13 |
| 21 | December; 30 | @ Melbourne | 45–80 | Mijović (18) | Mijović (10) | St. Blicavs (5) | State Basketball Centre | 7–14 |

== Signings ==
=== Returning ===
| Player | Signed | Contract |
|---|---|---|
| Sara Blicavs | 8 June 2016 | 1-year contract |
| Stephanie Blicavs | 18 May 2017 | 1-year contract |
| Amelia Todhunter | 7 June 2017 | 1-year contract |

=== Incoming ===
| Player | Signed | Contract |
|---|---|---|
| Carley Mijović | 9 May 2017 | 1-year contract |
| Kayla Pedersen | 16 May 2017 | 1-year contract |
| Tessa Lavey | 24 May 2017 | 2-year contract |
| Kiera Rowe | 25 May 2017 | 2-year contract |
| Rebecca Pizzey | 25 May 2017 | 2-year contract |
| Laia Palau | 1 June 2017 | 1-year contract |
| Tayla Roberts | 15 June 2017 | 1-year contract |

== Awards ==
=== In-season ===
| Award | Recipient | Round(s) / Date | Ref. |
|---|---|---|---|
| Team of the Week | Sara Blicavs | Round 3 | |
| Team of the Week | Carley Mijović | Rounds: 3, 9 | |
| Team of the Week | Kayla Pedersen | Round 6 | |
| Team of the Week | Tessa Lavey | Round 7 | |
