= 2017–18 Canberra Capitals season =

- Head Coach: Paul Goriss
- Captain: Natalie Hurst
- Venue: National Convention Centre

Results
- Record: 7–14
- Ladder: 6th
- Finals: Did not qualify

Leaders
- Points: Bass (11.7)
- Rebounds: Hooper (4.9)
- Assists: Hurst (6.7)

The 2017–18 Canberra Capitals season was the 34th season for the franchise in the Women's National Basketball League (WNBL).

== Roster ==
2017–18 Canberra Capitals roster
Players
Coaches

| Pos. | No. | Nat. | Name | Ht. |
|---|---|---|---|---|
| F | 3 | (United States) | Bass, Mistie | 1.93 m (6 ft 4 in) |
| F | 5 | (Australia) | Magbegor, Eziyoda | 1.93 m (6 ft 4 in) |
| G | 7 | (Australia) | Hurst, Natalie (C) | 1.63 m (5 ft 4 in) |
| G | 9 | (Australia) | Bourne, Callie | 1.80 m (5 ft 11 in) |
| G | 10 | (Australia) | Gaze, Kate | 1.78 m (5 ft 10 in) |
| F | 12 | (Australia) | Jarry, Rachel (injured) | 1.85 m (6 ft 1 in) |
| G | 13 | (Australia) | Wehrung, Abigail | 1.78 m (5 ft 10 in) |
| G | 20 | (New Zealand) | Paalvast, Chevannah | 1.80 m (5 ft 11 in) |
| F | 21 | (Australia) | Froling, Keely | 1.88 m (6 ft 2 in) |
| C | 22 | (Australia) | Scherf, Lauren | 1.96 m (6 ft 5 in) |
| G | 23 | (Australia) | Rocci, Maddison | 1.67 m (5 ft 6 in) |
| F | 35 | (United States) | Hooper, Jordan | 1.88 m (6 ft 2 in) |

Head coach

- (Australia) Paul Goriss

Assistant coach(es)

- (Australia) Peta Sinclair
- (Australia) Carly Wilson

Legend

- (C) Team captain
- (DP) Development player
- (I) Import player
- Injured

- Roster
Updated: 28 September 2017

== Standings ==
| # | WNBL Championship ladder | | | | |
| # | Team | W | L | PCT | GP |
|---|---|---|---|---|---|
| 1 | Perth Lynx | 15 | 6 | 71.4 | 21 |
| 2 | Sydney Uni Flames | 14 | 7 | 66.6 | 21 |
| 3 | Townsville Fire | 14 | 7 | 66.6 | 21 |
| 4 | Melbourne Boomers | 12 | 9 | 57.1 | 21 |
| 5 | Adelaide Lightning | 11 | 10 | 52.3 | 21 |
| 6 | Canberra Capitals | 7 | 14 | 33.3 | 21 |
| 7 | Dandenong Rangers | 7 | 14 | 33.3 | 21 |
| 8 | Bendigo Spirit | 4 | 17 | 19.1 | 21 |

== Results ==
=== Pre-season ===
| Game | Date | Team | Score | High points | High rebounds | High assists | Location | Record |
|---|---|---|---|---|---|---|---|---|
| 1 | September; 15 | Fujitsu Red Wave | 75–73 | – | – | – | Belconnen Basketball Centre | 1–0 |
| 2 | September; 23 | @ Sydney | 69–72 | Scherf (17) | – | – | Brydens Stadium | 1–1 |

=== Regular season ===
| Game | Date | Team | Score | High points | High rebounds | High assists | Location | Record |
|---|---|---|---|---|---|---|---|---|
| 1 | October; 6 | Bendigo | 93–80 | Wehrung (22) | Hurst, Magbegor (8) | Hurst (14) | National Convention Centre | 1–0 |
| 2 | October; 8 | Adelaide | 84–77 | Hooper (19) | Hooper (7) | Hurst (7) | National Convention Centre | 2–0 |
| 3 | October; 13 | @ Townsville | 65–76 | Hurst, Scherf (13) | Scherf (8) | Hurst (6) | Townsville RSL Stadium | 2–1 |
| 4 | October; 15 | Melbourne | 63–92 | Magbegor (11) | Magbegor (4) | Rocci (4) | National Convention Centre | 2–2 |
| 5 | October; 22 | Dandenong | 76–77 | Wehrung (19) | Scherf (8) | Hurst (8) | National Convention Centre | 2–3 |
| 6 | October; 25 | @ Adelaide | 77–80 | Wehrung (14) | Hooper (7) | Hurst (6) | Titanium Security Arena | 2–4 |
| 7 | October; 27 | Townsville | 68–83 | Bass (11) | Hooper, Scherf, Wehrung (9) | Hurst (8) | National Convention Centre | 2–5 |
| 8 | November; 2 | @ Sydney | 62–81 | Bass (15) | Hooper (11) | Gaze, Hurst (3) | Brydens Stadium | 2–6 |
| 9 | November; 4 | Sydney | 72–81 | Hurst (13) | Scherf (6) | Hurst (8) | National Convention Centre | 2–7 |
| 10 | November; 11 | @ Perth | 67–85 | Hooper (13) | Scherf (10) | Hurst (5) | Bendat Basketball Centre | 2–8 |
| 11 | November; 18 | @ Melbourne | 66–96 | Bass (12) | Magbegor (9) | Hurst (7) | State Basketball Centre | 2–9 |
| 12 | November; 25 | Bendigo | 80–83 | Magbegor (16) | Bass, Hurst (7) | Hurst (7) | State Basketball Centre | 2–10 |
| 13 | November; 30 | @ Perth | 76–89 | Hooper (20) | Hooper (6) | Hurst (7) | Bendat Basketball Centre | 2–11 |
| 14 | December; 2 | @ Melbourne | 72–92 | Hurst (21) | Scherf (5) | Rocci (3) | State Basketball Centre | 2–12 |
| 15 | December; 7 | Sydney | 67–73 | Bass (16) | Hurst (7) | Hurst (8) | National Convention Centre | 2–13 |
| 16 | December; 9 | @ Dandenong | 81–78 | Hooper (21) | Bass (8) | Hurst (9) | Dandenong Stadium | 3–13 |
| 17 | December; 14 | @ Bendigo | 91–80 | Hurst (18) | Gaze (5) | Hurst (6) | Bendigo Stadium | 4–13 |
| 18 | December; 17 | Adelaide | 88–87 | Bass (21) | Gaze, Hooper, Wehrung (5) | Wehrung (8) | National Convention Centre | 5–13 |
| 19 | December; 21 | Townsville | 66–99 | Bass (18) | Bass, Scherf (5) | Hurst, Rocci (5) | National Convention Centre | 5–14 |
| 20 | December; 23 | @ Dandenong | 63–59 | Gaze (14) | Gaze, Scherf (5) | Paalvast, Rocci (5) | Dandenong Stadium | 6–14 |
| 21 | December; 29 | Perth | 74–69 | Hooper (22) | Magbegor (8) | Hurst (8) | National Convention Centre | 7–14 |

== Signings ==
=== Returning ===
| Player | Signed | Contract |
|---|---|---|
| Keely Froling | 8 June 2016 | 2-year contract |
| Abigail Wehrung | 18 May 2017 | 1-year contract |
| Kate Gaze | 7 June 2017 | 1-year contract |

=== Incoming ===
| Player | Signed | Contract |
|---|---|---|
| Rachel Jarry | 20 April 2017 | 1-year contract |
| Lauren Scherf | 4 May 2017 | 2-year contract |
| Jordan Hooper | 30 May 2017 | 1-year contract |
| Natalie Hurst | 9 June 2017 | 1-year contract |
| Maddison Rocci | 21 June 2017 | 1-year contract |
| Eziyoda Magbegor | 6 July 2017 | 1-year contract |
| Mistie Bass | 3 August 2017 | 1-year contract |
| Chevannah Paalvast | 14 September 2017 | 1-year contract |

== Awards ==
=== In-season ===
| Award | Recipient | Round(s) / Date | Ref. |
|---|---|---|---|
| Team of the Week | Jordan Hooper | Round 1 | |
| Team of the Week | Natalie Hurst | Round 1 | |
