= Kelly Wilson =

Australian basketball player (born 1984)

Bendigo Spirit
- Position: Guard
- League: WNBL

Personal information
- Born: 1 January 1984 (age 42) (Note: Some sources list her as being born on 1 January 1984, while others state she was born on 1 January 1985.) Melbourne, Victoria, Australia
- Listed height: 170 cm (5 ft 7 in)

Career information
- Playing career: 2001–present

Career history
- 2001–2002: Nunawading Spectres
- 2002–2003: Australian Institute of Sport
- 2003: Sydney Comets
- 2003–2005: Sydney Uni Flames
- 2004: Sutherland Sharks
- 2005: Bendigo Braves
- 2005–2008: Townsville Fire
- 2006: Townsville Flames
- 2008: Mackay Meteorettes
- 2008–2016: Bendigo Spirit
- 2009–2011: Bendigo Braves
- 2012–2014: Knox Raiders
- 2015–2019: Bendigo Braves
- 2016–2018: Townsville Fire
- 2018–2019: Canberra Capitals
- 2019–2020: Bendigo Spirit
- 2021–2024: Bendigo Braves
- 2021–2022: Canberra Capitals
- 2022–present: Bendigo Spirit
- 2026: Bendigo Braves

Career highlights
- 5× WNBL champion (2013, 2014, 2018, 2019, 2025); WNBL Rookie of the Year (2003); NBL1 National champion (2023); NBL1 South champion (2023); NBL1 Most Valuable Player (2019); 2× NBL1 South All-Star Five (2019, 2023); NBL1 National Finals All-Star Five (2024); 2× SEABL champion (2013, 2018); 2× SEABL MVP (2009, 2013); QBL MVP (2008); QBL Sunstate Division U23 Youth Player of the Year (2006)

Kelly Louise Wilson (born 1 January 1984) is an Australian professional basketball player.

== Early life ==
Wilson was born in Melbourne, Victoria, and grew up in the Victorian country town of Leongatha. She played her junior basketball for Leongatha Basketball Association.

== Career ==
=== WNBL ===
Wilson made her WNBL debut with the Australian Institute of Sport (AIS) in 2002 and won the WNBL Rookie of the Year. She played for the Sydney Uni Flames between 2003 and 2005, and the Townsville Fire between 2005 and 2008. She played the next eight seasons for the Bendigo Spirit, winning championships in 2013 and 2014. She returned to the Fire in 2016 and played two seasons, winning a third championship in 2018. For the 2018–19 season, she played for the Canberra Capitals and won her fourth championship. For the 2019–20 season, she returned to the Spirit. In January 2020, Wilson broke the WNBL's all-time games played record, when she took to the court in her 395th game, beating the previous record-holder, Jessica Bibby.

After sitting out the 2020 hub season due to the birth of her first child, Wilson returned to the Canberra Capitals for the 2021–22 season. In January 2022, she played her 400th WNBL game. She returned to the Bendigo Spirit for the 2022–23 WNBL season.

In February 2024, Wilson became the first WNBL player to reach 450 WNBL games.

In the 2024–25 WNBL season, Wilson helped the Spirit win the championship, collecting her fifth WNBL title.

On 29 January 2026, Kelly joined the Spirit for the last three games of the 2025–26 WNBL season as an injury replacement for Micah Simpson.

On 4 September 2026, Kelly re-signed with the Spirit for the 2026–27 WNBL season, marking her 23rd WNBL season.

=== State Leagues ===
Wilson debuted in the South East Australian Basketball League (SEABL) in 2001 for the Nunawading Spectres. She played a second season for the Spectres in 2002. She played in the Waratah League over the next two years, first with the Sydney Comets in 2003 and then with the Sutherland Sharks in 2004. She returned to the SEABL in 2005 to play for the Bendigo Braves.

In 2006, Wilson played for the Townsville Flames in the Queensland Basketball League (QBL) and was named the Sunstate Division U23 Youth Player of the Year. She returned to QBL in 2008 with the Mackay Meteorettes and was named league MVP.

Wilson returned to the SEABL in 2009 and won the league MVP with the Bendigo Braves. After being cut by the Braves following three seasons, she joined the Knox Raiders in 2012, going on to win the SEABL championship and her second league MVP in 2013. After three seasons with Knox, she returned to Bendigo in 2015 and in 2018 won her second SEABL championship. She played for the Braves in the inaugural NBL1 season in 2019, winning the league MVP. She had a short stint with the Braves during the 2021 NBL1 South season. She continued with the Braves in 2022 and 2023. She was named NBL1 South All-Star Five in 2023 and led the Braves to the NBL1 South championship and the NBL1 National championship. With the Braves in 2024, she earned the NBL1 South Golden Hands Award. The Braves missed the 2024 NBL1 South playoffs but returned to the 2024 NBL1 National Finals as defending champions, where they reached the championship game and Wilson earned All-Star Five honours.

Wilson re-joined the Bendigo Braves for the 2026 NBL1 South season.

=== National team ===
Wilson made her international debut for Australia in 2003. In 2007, she was part of the historic Emerging Opals team that claimed the gold medal at the World University Games in Bangkok, Thailand. She earned a national team call-up in 2013 to help Australia win the FIBA Oceania Championships.

== Personal life ==
Wilson's sister, Andrea, also played in the WNBL.

In September 2025, Wilson gave birth to her second child.
