= Kalani Purcell =

New Zealand basketball player

Personal information
- Born: 13 January 1995 (age 31) Auckland, New Zealand
- Listed height: 6 ft 2 in (1.88 m)

Career information
- High school: John Paul College (Brisbane, Queensland)
- College: Hutchinson CC (2013–2015); BYU (2015–2017)
- WNBA draft: 2017: undrafted
- Playing career: 2012–present
- Position: Forward

Career history
- 2012: South West Metro Pirates
- 2013: Waikato Wizards
- 2014: Auckland Lady Hawks
- 2017: Brisbane Spartans
- 2017–2020: Melbourne Boomers
- 2018: South West Metro Pirates
- 2019: Auckland Dream
- 2020–2022: Southern Districts Spartans
- 2021–2022: Sydney Uni Flames
- 2023: Tokomanawa Queens
- 2024–2025: Southern Districts Spartans

Career highlights
- WBC champion (2019); WBC MVP (2014); WBC All-Star Five (2014); 2× WCC First Team (2016, 2017); WCC Defensive Player of the Year (2017); WCC Newcomer of the Year (2016)
Medals
Representing New Zealand
Women's basketball
Commonwealth Games
| Bronze medal – third place | 2018 Gold Coast | Team competition |
FIBA Oceania Championship
| Silver medal – second place | 2013 Australia / New Zealand | Team |
| Silver medal – second place | 2015 Australia / New Zealand | Team |

Kalani Purcell (born 13 January 1995) is a New Zealand professional basketball player.

== Early life and career ==
Purcell was born in Auckland, New Zealand. She later moved to Australia, where she attended John Paul College in Brisbane, Queensland.

Purcell played for the South West Metro Pirates in the Queensland Basketball League in 2012, before returning to New Zealand to play in the Women's Basketball Championship (WBC) for the Waikato Wizards in 2013 and the Auckland Lady Hawks in 2014. She was named WBC MVP and earned league All-Star Five honours in 2014.

== College career ==
Purcell played her first two seasons of college basketball for Hutchinson Community College between 2013 and 2015. She joined the BYU Cougars in 2015 and played two seasons of NCAA Division I.

=== Statistics ===
| Year | Team | GP | GS | MPG | FG% | 3P% | FT% | RPG | APG | SPG | BPG | TO | PPG |
|---|---|---|---|---|---|---|---|---|---|---|---|---|---|
| 2013–14 | Hutchinson | 36 | 5 | 26.3 | .522 | .421 | .593 | 10.3 | 3.7 | 3.6 | 1.4 | 3.2 | 13.7 |
| 2014–15 | Hutchinson | 34 | 34 | 31.0 | .561 | .174 | .733 | 11.9 | 5.1 | 3.5 | 1.2 | 3.0 | 18.1 |
| 2015–16 | Brigham Young | 33 | 33 | 35.6 | .451 | .237 | .678 | 12.6 | 4.7 | 2.0 | 0.7 | 4.3 | 12.0 |
| 2016–17 | Brigham Young | 32 | 32 | 36.8 | .469 | .286 | .622 | 10.5 | 4.9 | 2.2 | 1.3 | 4.9 | 12.7 |
| Career | | 135 | 104 | 32.2 | .504 | .270 | .658 | 11.3 | 4.5 | 2.8 | 1.1 | 3.8 | 14.1 |

== Professional career ==
=== WNBL ===
Purcell joined the Melbourne Boomers of the Women's National Basketball League (WNBL) for the 2017–18 season. She continued with the Boomers in 2018–19, 2019–20, and the 2020 WNBL Hub season. She joined the Sydney Uni Flames for the 2021–22 WNBL season.

=== QBL/NBL1 North and WBC/Tauihi ===
Purcell played for the Brisbane Spartans in the Queensland Basketball League (QBL) in 2017 before re-joining the South West Metro Pirates for the 2018 QBL season. In 2019, she played for the Auckland Dream in New Zealand's Women's Basketball Championship.

In 2020, Purcell played for the Southern Districts Spartans in the Queensland State League (QSL). She continued with the Spartans, now in the NBL1 North, in the 2021 NBL1 season and 2022 NBL1 season.

In 2023, Purcell played for the Tokomanawa Queens in the Tauihi Basketball Aotearoa.

Purcell returned to the Spartans for the 2024 NBL1 season, and again for the 2025 NBL1 season.

== National team career ==
Purcell debuted for New Zealand at the 2009 FIBA Oceania Under-16 Championship. She made her senior international debut with the Tall Ferns at the 2013 FIBA Oceania Championship. She went on to play for the Tall Ferns at the 2015 FIBA Oceania Championship, 2016 FIBA World Olympic Qualifying Tournament, 2017 FIBA Women's Asia Cup, 2019 FIBA Women's Asia Cup, 2019 FIBA Women’s Olympic Pre-Qualifying Asian Tournament, and 2021 FIBA Women's Asia Cup.

Purcell played for the New Zealand women's national 3x3 team at the 2022 Commonwealth Games.

== Personal life ==
Purcell is the youngest of seven children to Ingrid and Brian Purcell. Two of her older sisters, Charmian and Natalie, have also represented the Tall Ferns and are both Olympians.

Purcell and her partner, NBL player Tyrell Harrison, had their first child in 2023.
