= Sydney Wiese =

American basketball player (born 1995)

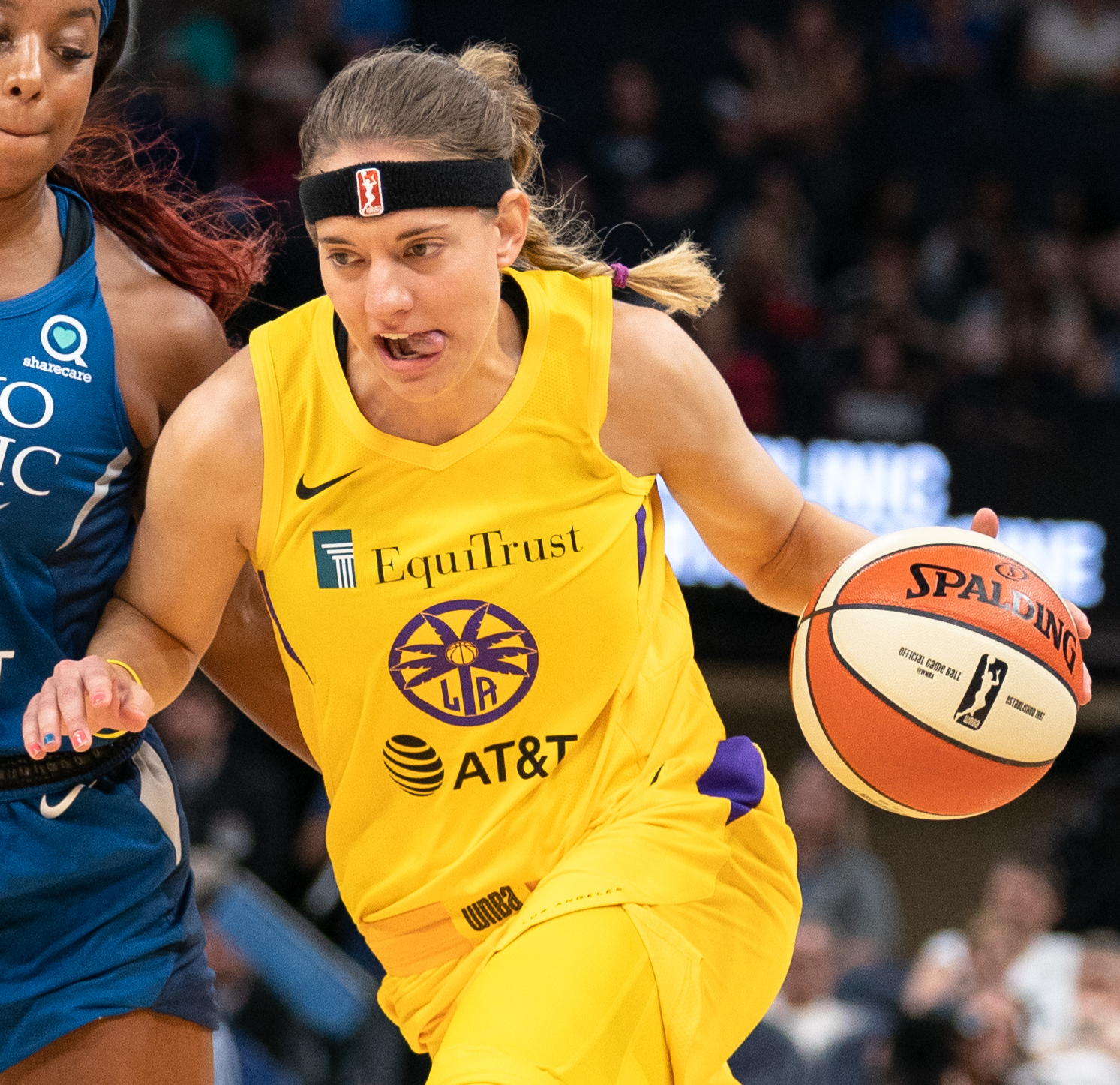
- Wiese in 2019

Personal information
- Born: June 16, 1995 (age 31) Phoenix, Arizona, U.S.
- Listed height: 6 ft 0 in (1.83 m)
- Listed weight: 165 lb (75 kg)

Career information
- High school: Pinnacle (Phoenix, Arizona)
- College: Oregon State (2013–2017)
- WNBA draft: 2017: 1st round, 11th overall pick
- Drafted by: Los Angeles Sparks
- Playing career: 2017–present
- Position: Point guard / shooting guard

Career history
- 2017–2020: Los Angeles Sparks
- 2017–2018: Townsville Fire
- 2018–2019: A.S. Ramat HaSharon
- 2019–2020: AE Sedis Bàsquet
- 2021: Washington Mystics

Career highlights
- Senior CLASS Award (2017); Third-team All-American – AP (2017); All-American – USBWA (2017); Pac-12 All-Freshman Team (2014); 4x All-Pac 12 (2014–2017)
- Stats at WNBA.com
- Stats at Basketball Reference
Medals
Women's basketball
Representing United States
2015 Summer Universiade
Gold medal – first place	2015 Gwangju	Team

Sydney Rose Wiese (born June 16, 1995) is an American former professional basketball player and basketball coach. A four-time All-Pac-12 Team point guard and third-team All American during her collegiate career with the Oregon State University Beavers, Wiese was drafted with the 11th overall pick in the 2017 WNBA draft.

== Biography ==
=== Early years ===
Sydney Wiese was born June 16, 1995, in Phoenix, Arizona. She attended Pinnacle High School in Phoenix. She was a star player at Pinnacle, playing under her father, rookie head coach Troy Wiese, during her senior year. During her high school career she helped lead the Pioneers to three appearances in the Arizona state high school basketball championships.

During her senior year, Wiese averaged 18.5 points and 5.2 assists per game en route to being named the 2013 Arizona Big Schools Player of the Year.

== College career ==
A point guard for the Oregon State Beavers, Wiese ended her career with school records in assists and three pointers made. She also holds the Pac-12 conference record for career three-pointers made, with 373.

Wiese was named to the All-Pac-12 Team by a vote of coaches and members of the news media throughout her college career, becoming one of just 13 players in the history of the conference to be so recognized for all four seasons of their collegiate career. She was also one of ten semi-finalists for the 2017 Naismith Award as collegiate player of the year and was a third team member of the AP All-American Team.

Wiese was a member of the 2015 USA Basketball team which won a gold medal at the 2015 World University Games in Gwangju, South Korea.

== Professional career ==
=== WNBA ===
Wiese was drafted with the 11th overall pick in the 2017 WNBA draft by the Los Angeles Sparks. Wiese would play off the bench for the Sparks in her rookie season. She would transition into the shooting guard position after playing point guard in college. In just her second game, Wiese scored a career-high 22 points along with 6 three-pointers off the bench in a 99–89 victory over the Washington Mystics. By the end of the season, Wiese averaged 2.3 ppg and the Sparks were the number 2 seed in the league with a 26–8 record, receiving a double-bye to the semifinals. The Sparks would advance to the Finals for the second season in a row after defeating the Phoenix Mercury in a 3-game sweep of the semi-finals, setting up a rematch with the Minnesota Lynx. The Sparks had a 2–1 series lead in the Finals, but would lose the next two games.

In 2018, Wiese would have an unproductive season, playing 11 games without scoring any points while receiving barely any playing time. The Sparks were the number 6 seed in the league with a 19–15 record. They would defeat the championship-defending Minnesota Lynx in the first round elimination game 75–68. In the second round elimination game, the Sparks would lose 96–64 to the Washington Mystics.

In 2019, Wiese's role increased with more playing time and would get her first career start in the Sparks' starting lineup. She played 32 games with 16 starts and a career-high in minutes. The Sparks finished 22–12 with the number 3 seed, receiving a bye to the second round. In the second round elimination game, the Sparks defeated the championship-defending Seattle Storm 92–69. In the semi-finals, the Sparks would lose to the Connecticut Sun in a three-game sweep.

In 2020, the season was delayed and shortened to 22 games in a bubble at IMG Academy due to the COVID-19 pandemic. In May 2020, Wiese had signed a multi-year contract extension with the Sparks. On August 7, 2020, Wiese scored a season-high 18 points in a 86–82 loss to the Las Vegas Aces. During the season, Wiese played 19 games with 15 starts, putting up career-highs in scoring and also in both field goal and three-point shooting percentages. The Sparks finished the season 15–7 as the number 3 seed with a bye to the second round elimination game, but would once again lose to the Connecticut Sun.

On May 13, 2021, Wiese was traded to the Washington Mystics in exchange for a 2022 second-round WNBA Draft pick.

=== Overseas ===
In 2017, Wiese signed with the Townsville Fire of the Women's National Basketball League for the 2017-18 off-season. In 2018, she signed with A.S. Ramat Hasharon, an Israel D1 team for the 2018-19 off-season. In 2019, Wiese signed with AE Sedis Bàsquet of the Spanish league for the 2019-20 off-season.

== Career statistics ==
Legend
GP	Games played	GS	Games started	MPG	Minutes per game	RPG	Rebounds per game
APG	Assists per game	SPG	Steals per game	BPG	Blocks per game	PPG	Points per game
TO	Turnovers per game	FG%	Field-goal percentage	3P%	3-point field-goal percentage	FT%	Free-throw percentage
**Bold**	Career best	°	League leader

=== College ===
Year	Team	GP	GS	MPG	FG%	3P%	FT%	RPG	APG	SPG	BPG	TO	PPG
2013–14	Oregon State	35	35	34.2	44.7	42.4	79.5	3.3	4.0	1.1	.2	3.1	14.3
2014–15	Oregon State	32	32	32.5	**44.9**	41.8	81.5	2.5	**5.6**	.8	.3	**2.7**	12.7
2015–16	Oregon State	29	27	33.1	42.7	36.1	78.9	**5.8**	4.9	**1.4**	**.5**	3.0	12.8
2016–17	Oregon State	**36**	**36**	**34.6**	44.2	**42.6**	**85.8**	4.9	4.5	.8	.1	2.9	**15.2**
**Career**		132	130	33.7	44.1	41.0	81.9	4.1	4.7	1.0	.3	2.9	13.8

=== WNBA ===
==== Regular season ====
Year	Team	GP	GS	MPG	FG%	3P%	FT%	RPG	APG	SPG	BPG	TO	PPG
2017	Los Angeles	28	0	7.9	38.3	40.0	50.0	.8	.3	.2	.1	**.1**	2.3
2018	Los Angeles	11	0	3.3	.000	.000	.000	.3	.2	.0	–	**.1**	0.0
2019	Los Angeles	**32**	**16**	20.6	38.5	36.6	**1.000**	1.3	**1.8**	.5	**.3**	1.0	4.8
2020	Los Angeles	19	15	19.1	**50.5**	**47.2**	91.7	**1.7**	1.2	**.6**	.1	1.2	**6.8**
2021	Washington	27	8	**21.4**	32.3	29.1	77.8	1.3	1.6	0.4	–	1.0	4.4
Career	5 years, 2 teams	117	29	15.9	38.9	36.4	80.9	1.2	1.1	.4	.1	.7	4.0

==== Playoffs ====
Year	Team	GP	GS	MPG	FG%	3P%	FT%	RPG	APG	SPG	BPG	TO	PPG
2017	Los Angeles	1	0	0.5	.000	.000	.000	.0	.0	.0	.0	.0	0.0
2018	Los Angeles	1	0	2.8	.000	.000	.000	.0	.0	.0	.0	.0	0.0
2019	Los Angeles	**4**	0	**18.8**	**27.8**	**25.0**	**1.000**	**1.5**	**1.0**	**.5**	.0	.8	**4.3**
2020	Los Angeles	1	**1**	18.0	.000	.000	.000	.0	1.0	.0	.0	.0	0.0
Career	4 years, 1 team	7	1	13.9	23.8	21.4	1.000	.9	.7	.3	.0	.4	2.4

== Personal life ==
Wiese is the daughter of Patti and Troy Wiese and has an older brother, Christian Wiese. Her mother Patti is a church administrator and her father Troy is a sixth-grade teacher and high school girls' basketball coach. Wiese is also a Christian who has been involved in her church in Phoenix, participating in church youth programs and summer camps.
