= Asia Taylor =

American basketball player (born 1991)

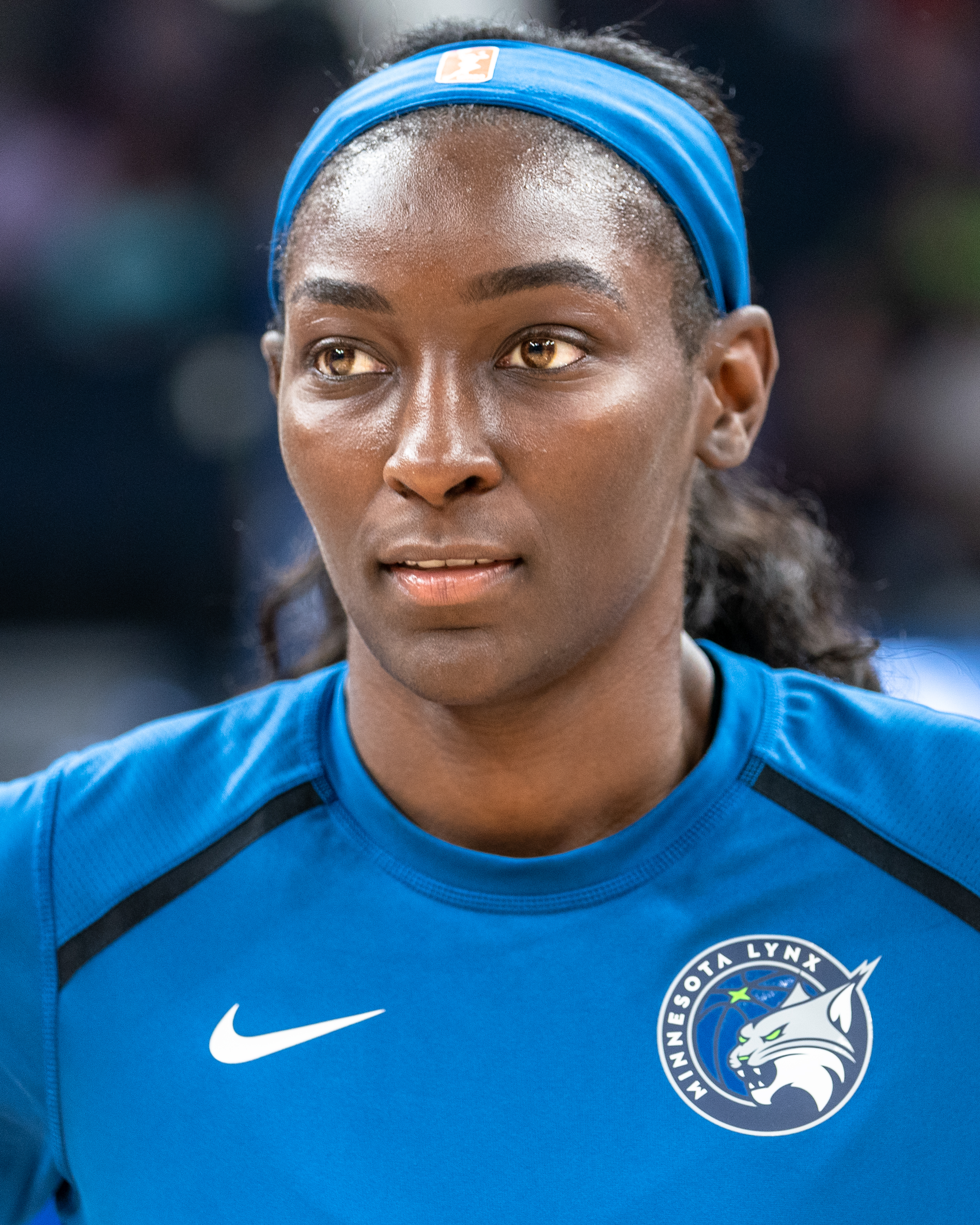
- Taylor with the Minnesota Lynx in 2019

Personal information
- Born: August 22, 1991 (age 35)
- Listed height: 6 ft 1 in (1.85 m)
- Listed weight: 167 lb (76 kg)

Career information
- High school: Whetstone (Columbus, Ohio)
- College: Louisville (2009–2014)
- WNBA draft: 2014: 3rd round, 36th overall pick
- Drafted by: Minnesota Lynx
- Playing career: 2014–2019
- Position: Small forward

Career history
- 2014: Minnesota Lynx
- 2014: CUS Cagliari
- 2015: Elitzur Holon
- 2015–2016: ASA Jerusalem
- 2016: Connecticut Sun
- 2016–2018: Sydney Uni Flames
- 2017: Washington Mystics
- 2018–2019: Indiana Fever
- 2018–present: Perth Lynx
- 2019: Phoenix Mercury
- 2020–?: UNI Győr Hungary

Career highlights
- WNBL champion (2017); 3× WNBL All-Star Five (2017–2019); AAC Most Improved Player (2014); First-team All-AAC (2014)
- Stats at WNBA.com
- Stats at Basketball Reference

Asia Taylor (born August 22, 1991) is an American professional basketball player.

== Louisville statistics ==
=== Louisville statistics ===
Legend
GP	Games played	GS	Games started	MPG	Minutes per game
FG%	Field goal percentage	3P%	3-point field goal percentage	FT%	Free throw percentage
RPG	Rebounds per game	APG	Assists per game	SPG	Steals per game
BPG	Blocks per game	PPG	Points per game	**Bold**	Career high

Year	Team	GP	Points	FG%	3P%	FT%	RPG	APG	SPG	BPG	PPG
2009-10	Louisville	31	43	34.4%	17.4%	60.0%	2.6	0.6	0.5	0.3	4.3
2010-11	Louisville	31	120	41.0%	33.3%	60.0%	3.3	0.7	0.7	0.2	3.9
2011-12	Louisville	32	180	47.9%	**50.0%**	70.5%	4.8	1.0	0.7	0.3	5.6
2012-13	Louisville	Medical redshirt									
2013-14	Louisville	**38**	**409**	**49.7%**	0.0%	**75.8%**	**7.2**	**2.0**	**1.4**	**0.6**	**10.8**
Career		127	752	42.3%	33.3%	62.0%	9.6	0.5	0.8	0.8	5.9

== WNBA career statistics ==
Legend
GP	Games played	GS	Games started	MPG	Minutes per game	RPG	Rebounds per game
APG	Assists per game	SPG	Steals per game	BPG	Blocks per game	PPG	Points per game
TO	Turnovers per game	FG%	Field-goal percentage	3P%	3-point field-goal percentage	FT%	Free-throw percentage
**Bold**	Career best	°	League leader

=== Regular season ===
Year	Team	GP	GS	MPG	FG%	3P%	FT%	RPG	APG	SPG	BPG	TO	PPG
2014	Minnesota	22	0	7.9	.525	.000	.750	1.4	0.5	0.2	0.0	0.7	2.7
2016	Connecticut	4	0	4.3	**.600**	.000	.857	1.0	0.8	0.0	0.0	0.3	3.0
2017	Washington	**24**	0	6.7	.325	.000	.731	**1.8**	0.4	**0.3**	**0.1**	0.5	1.9
2018	Indiana	14	0	**8.3**	.310	**.200**	.778	**1.8**	0.4	0.2	0.0	0.8	1.9
2019	Minnesota	8	0	8.1	.355	.000	**.833**	**1.8**	**0.9**	0.1	**0.1**	0.6	**3.1**
2019	Phoenix	4	0	7.8	.000	.000	.500	**1.8**	0.3	**0.3**	0.9	0.5	0.3
Career	5 years, 5 teams	76	0	7.4	.394	.111	.757	1.6	0.5	0.2	0.0	0.6	2.2

=== Playoffs ===
Year	Team	GP	GS	MPG	FG%	3P%	FT%	RPG	APG	SPG	BPG	TO	PPG
2014	Minnesota	2	0	1.0	**1.000**	.000	.000	0.0	0.0	0.0	0.0	0.0	**1.0**
2017	Washington	**4**	0	**1.8**	**1.000**	.000	**.400**	**0.8**	0.0	**0.3**	0.0	0.0	**1.0**
Career	2 years, 2 teams	6	0	1.5	1.000	.000	.400	0.5	0.0	0.2	0.0	0.0	1.0
