= Belinda Snell =

Australian basketball player (born 1981)

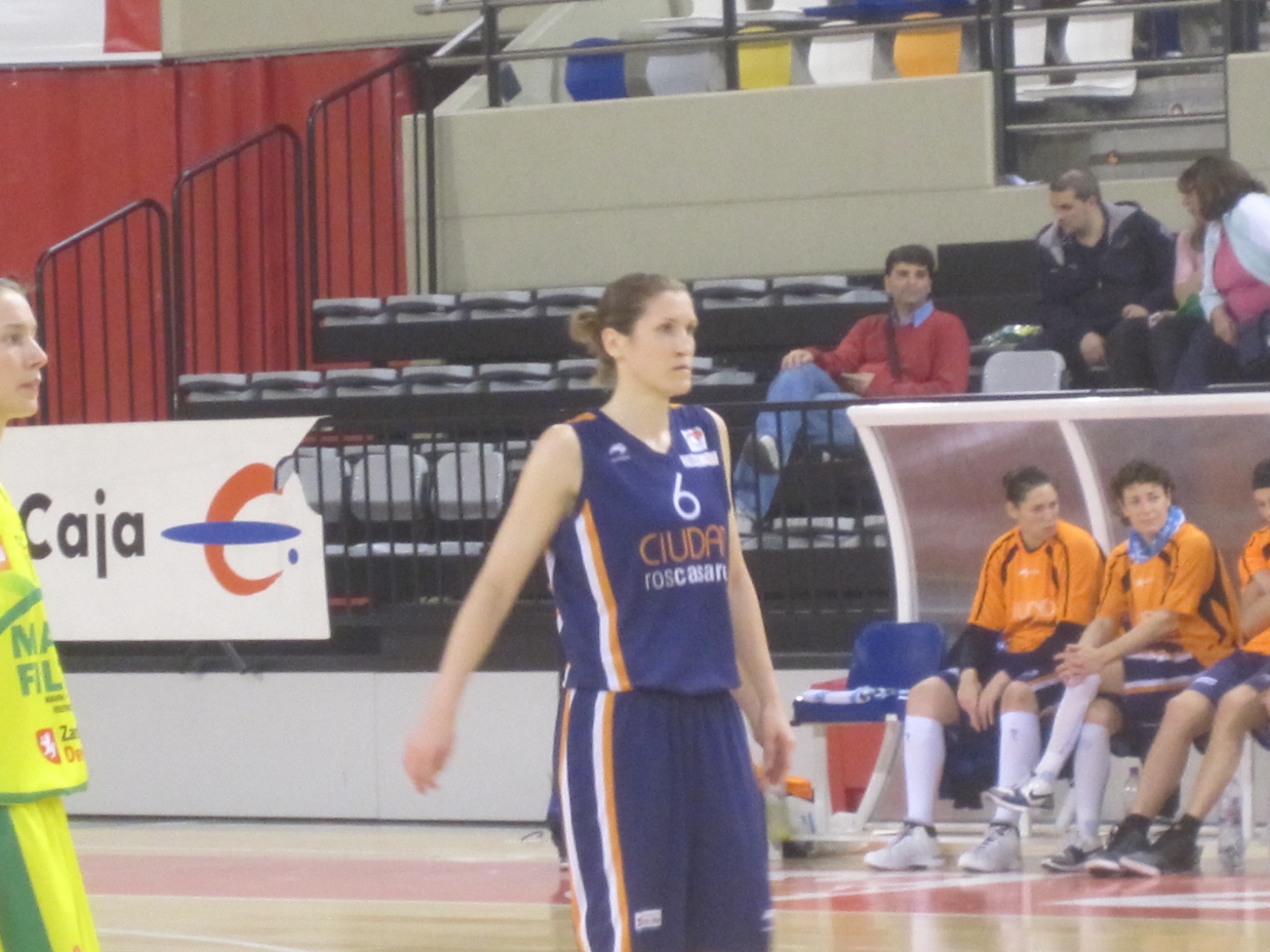
- Snell in 2010

Personal information
- Born: 10 January 1981 (age 45) Mirboo North, Victoria, Australia
- Listed height: 180 cm (5 ft 11 in)

Career information
- Playing career: 1998–2019
- Position: Shooting guard / small forward

Career history
- 1998–2000: AIS
- 2000–2006: Sydney Panthers / Uni Flames
- 2005–2007: Phoenix Mercury
- 2006–2007: Cestistica Spezzina
- 2007–2008: CJM Bourges Basket
- 2008–2009: Dynamo Moscow
- 2009–2010: San Antonio Silver Stars
- 2009–2010: Ros Casares Valencia
- 2010–2011: Avenida
- 2011: Seattle Storm
- 2011–2012: Sydney Uni Flames
- 2012–2014: CCC Polkowice
- 2014–2016: Bendigo Spirit
- 2016–2019: Sydney Uni Flames

Career highlights
- WNBA champion (2007); WNBL champion (1999, 2001, 2017); EuroLeague champion (2011); 2× Spanish LFB champion (2010, 2011); French LFB champion (2008); PLKK champion (2013); 4× WNBL All-Star Five (2001, 2004, 2005, 2012); WNBL Top Shooter Award (2005)
- Stats at Basketball Reference

Belinda Snell (born 10 January 1981) is an Australian former professional basketball player. She played 10 seasons in the Women's National Basketball League (WNBL) in addition to the WNBA and Europe.

She was a member of the Australia women's national basketball team, winning two silver medals at the 2004 and 2008 Summer Olympics, a bronze medal at the 2012 Summer Olympics, a gold medal at the 2006 Commonwealth Games, a gold medal at the 2018 Commonwealth Games, a gold medal at the 2006 World Championships, and a bronze medal at the 2014 World Championships.

== Personal ==
Snell was born on 10 January 1981 in Mirboo North, Victoria. She is 180 centimetres (71 in) tall. In 2006, she weighed 80 kilograms (180 lb).

Other sports Snell has played include tennis and netball. In April 2012, she was at the Reservoir West Primary School for the launch of Prime Minister's Olympic and Paralympic Challenges. As part of the event, she tried out in sports including goal ball and sitting basketball.

== Basketball ==
Snell is a guard and forward. She started playing basketball when she was eight years old in Mirboo North for a mixed gendered team. For under-14 basketball, she played for a team in Knox, Victoria, travelling two hours to Melbourne each Friday night to play. She was later selected for the Country Victoria team.

=== Professional ===
==== WNBL ====
Snell was born the year the WNBL was founded.

In 1998/1999, she had a scholarship with and played for the Australian Institute of Sport. When she joined the AIS WNBL team, she was one of the newest members of the squad, with most of the team having been hold overs from the previous year. Her AIS team won the championship in 1998/1999. Her teammates included Lauren Jackson, Penny Taylor and Suzy Batkovic. In the 2000/2001 season, she was named WNBL's All-Star Five. In the 2004/2005 season, she was named WNBL's All-Star Five. She played for the Sydney Uni Flames this season. In a January 2005 game against the Perth Lynx that her team won 109–54, Snell scored 54 points and broke a WNBL single game scoring record set by Julie Nykiel in 1982 where Nykiel scored 53 points. In the game, she shot 12 of 21 from three-point range. This broke the WNBL's record of eight three-pointers in a game set by Michele Timms in 1988 and Narelle Fletcher in 2003. She had 29 points at the half. After reaching the 50-point mark, her teammates started intentionally feeding her the ball to help her break the record. She shot 6 of 9 from the free throw line in the game. She also had 9 rebounds, 9 steals and 7 assists. She played in 37 minutes of the 40-minute game. That season, she was coached by Karen Dalton.

In 2005/2006, Snell played for the WNBL's Sydney Uni Flames. She played for the Sydney Uni Flames in 2011/2012. In an October 2011 game against the Logan Thunder, she scored 23 points, sinking 5 of her 6 attempted three-pointers. She was named to the WNBL's All-Star Five. She missed at least one game in the WNBL pre-season. The team started off the season 7–0.

==== Europe ====
Snell has played professional basketball in Italy, Russia, Spain and France. In 2006, she was playing for Spezia in the Italian league. In June 2009, she joined by Ros Casares, then current champion of the Spanish Women's League. In June 2010, she joined another Spanish team, the great rival of Ros Casares; Perfumerías Avenidas de Salamanca. In PLKK season 2012/13 she played for CCC Polkowice and won Championship's title and Polish Cup as well.

==== WNBA ====
Snell was selected by the Phoenix Mercury following her performance at the 2004 Summer Olympics. and played for them during the 2006 season. In 2007, she played for the Phoenix Mercury but she did not feel like she got enough playing time. That season, she started in two games after Diana Taurasi's suspensions. By July 2007, she had was averaging four points a game, playing low minutes including three in one and thirteen in another. As of mid-July, she had a player efficiency rating of around 5.0. Her team won the Championship that year. Prior to the start of the 2011 WNBA season, she had signed a training camp contract with the Seattle Storm. She played for the Storm during the regular season but spent most of her time on the bench. In 2011, she played for the Seattle Storm, making appearances in 21 regular season games, playing an average of 6.4 minutes per game. She had a field goal percentage of 39.3%, with a three-point shooting percentage of 38.1%.

=== National team ===
Snell is a member of the Australia women's national basketball team. In 2003, she was a member of the Australian Women's Senior Team that competed in the Oceania Championship Series. She was a member of the Australian senior team that won a silver medal at the 2004 Summer Olympics. She was a member of the 2005 Opals. In 2006, she was a member of the Australian women's senior team that won a gold medal at the Commonwealth Games. She wore number 12. In 2006, she was a member of the Australian women's senior team that won a gold medal at the World Championships in Brazil. This was one of the highlights of her basketball playing career. She was one of the key components for the team's success. Her team beat the Canada women's national basketball team by 32 points with a final score of 97–65 in their third game of the competition. In the Canadian victory, she was the team's leading scorer with 24 points, three steals, two rebounds and two assists. On their off day from the tournament, she and her teammates did "girly" things like going shopping at a local mall.

In March 2007, Snell was named to the national team what would prepare for the 2008 Summer Olympics. She was a member of the 2008 Summer Olympics Australian women's team that won a silver medal at the Olympics. In the gold medal game against the United States, she scored 15 points in the first half. In June 2010, she was viewed by national team coach Carrie Graf as one of a quartet of strong players that would represent Australia in a tour of China, the United States and Europe. In July 2010, she participated in a four-day training camp and one game test match against the United States in Connecticut. In 2010, she was a member of the senior women's national team that competed at the World Championships in the Czech Republic. The team finished fifth. She was a member of the Opals in 2011. She was named to the 2012 Australia women's national basketball team. In February 2012, she was named to a short list of 24 eligible players to represent Australia at the Olympics. Opals teammate Lauren Jackson said O'Hea and Snell were players who would step up after Penny Taylor was injured and ruled out for London. She was scheduled to participate in the national team training camp held from 14 to 18 May 2012 at the Australian Institute of Sport.

On 31 July 2012, during the Opals' Olympics preliminary round game against France, Snell hit a buzzer-beating three-point shot from behind the half-court line to tie the game at 65–65, and force overtime. Unfortunately for the Opals, they would lose the game 74–70.

== Career statistics ==
Legend
GP	Games played	GS	Games started	MPG	Minutes per game	RPG	Rebounds per game
APG	Assists per game	SPG	Steals per game	BPG	Blocks per game	PPG	Points per game
TO	Turnovers per game	FG%	Field-goal percentage	3P%	3-point field-goal percentage	FT%	Free-throw percentage
**Bold**	Career best	°	League leader

†	Denotes season(s) in which Snell won a WNBA championship

=== WNBA ===
==== Regular season ====
WNBA regular season statistics
Year	Team	GP	GS	MPG	FG%	3P%	FT%	RPG	APG	SPG	BPG	TO	PPG
2005	Phoenix	20	0	11.4	.345	.297	.889	1.8	0.9	0.4	**0.1**	0.6	3.3
2006	Phoenix	**30**	0	8.3	.389	.317	**1.000**	1.3	0.6	0.5	**0.1**	0.6	3.3
2007 †	Phoenix	**30**	2	11.4	.349	.329	.636	1.5	1.5	0.7	**0.1**	0.6	3.6
2008	Did not play (Olympics prioritization)												
2009	San Antonio	**30**	**6**	18.4	.335	.307	.793	**2.3**	1.2	**0.9**	**0.1**	0.6	**6.2**
2010	San Antonio	2	1	**19.0**	.333	.200	**1.000**	2.0	**2.5**	0.0	0.0	1.0	4.5
2011	Seattle	21	0	6.4	**.393**	**.381**	.846	0.7	0.3	0.1	**0.1**	**0.4**	2.0
**Career**	6 years, 3 teams	133	9	11.6	.353	.316	.831	1.6	1.0	0.5	0.1	0.6	3.8

==== Playoffs ====
WNBA playoff statistics
Year	Team	GP	GS	MPG	FG%	3P%	FT%	RPG	APG	SPG	BPG	TO	PPG
2007 †	Phoenix	**8**	0	6.5	**.174**	**.222**	**.500**	1.1	0.9	**0.1**	0.0	0.3	**1.6**
2009	San Antonio	1	0	**7.0**	.000	.000	—	**2.0**	**1.0**	0.0	0.0	**0.0**	0.0
2011	Seattle	2	0	3.0	.000	—	—	0.0	0.0	0.0	0.0	0.5	0.0
**Career**	3 years, 3 teams	11	0	5.9	.154	.200	.500	1.0	0.7	0.1	0.0	0.3	1.2

== See also ==
- List of Australian WNBA players
