= Jenna O'Hea =

Australian basketball player (born 1987)

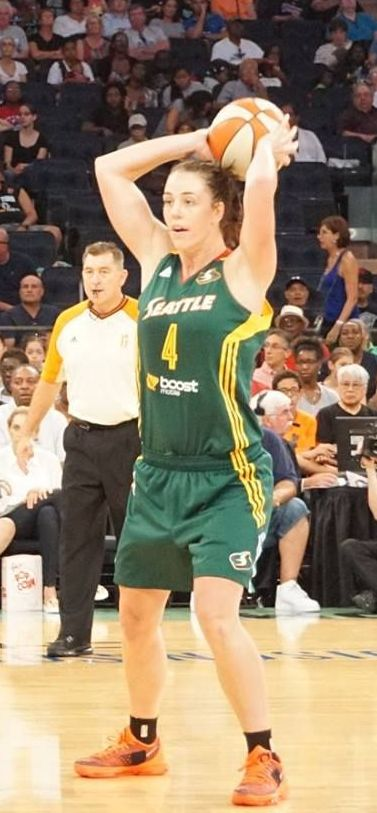
- O'Hea at Madison Square Garden in 2015

No. 4 – Southside Flyers
- Position: Guard / forward
- League: WNBL

Personal information
- Born: 6 June 1987 (age 39) Traralgon, Victoria, Australia
- Listed height: 186 cm (6 ft 1 in)
- Listed weight: 174 lb (79 kg)

Career information
- High school: Caulfield Grammar, Melbourne
- Playing career: 2003–2022

Career history
- 2003–2005: Australian Institute of Sport
- 2005–2007: Dandenong Rangers
- 2007–2008: Bendigo Spirit
- 2008–2009: ASPTT Arras
- 2009–2011: Bulleen Boomers
- 2011–2013: Los Angeles Sparks
- 2011–2014: Dandenong Rangers
- 2014–2016: Seattle Storm
- 2014–2016: BLMA
- 2017–2019: Melbourne Boomers
- 2019: Melbourne Tigers
- 2019–2022: Southside Flyers
- 2021: Sandringham Sabres

Career highlights
- 3× WNBL champion (2011, 2012, 2020); 6× All-WNBL Team (2010–2014, 2020); French League champion (2016); 2× French Cup winner (2015, 2016)
- Stats at WNBA.com
- Stats at Basketball Reference
Medals
Basketball
Representing Australia
Olympic Games
Bronze medal – third place	2012 London	Team
FIBA World Cup
Silver medal – second place	2018 Spain	Team
FIBA Asia Cup
Bronze medal – third place	2019 Bangalore	Team
Commonwealth Games
Gold medal – first place	2018 Gold Coast	Team

Jenna O'Hea (born 6 June 1987) is an Australian former professional basketball player and former captain of Australia's national team, the Opals.

O'Hea was the captain of the Australian Women's basketball team (Opals) at the 2020 Tokyo Olympics. The Opals were eliminated after losing to the USA in the quarterfinals.

== Basketball career ==
=== Junior Basketball ===
O'Hea played for the Nunawading Spectres at junior level, and represented her home state of Victoria at the U16, U18 and U20 levels. She played for Victoria Metro in the Australian under-16 championships in 2001 and 2002, and at the Australian under-18 Championships in 2003. She also represented Victoria in netball at the U16 Championships in New Zealand. In 2003, O'Hea was awarded a scholarship with the Australian Institute of Sport (AIS), earning the Betty Watson Rookie of the Year Award. She had 19 caps with the Australian U19 Gems team in 2003, 2004 and 2005, and was a member of the team that won a gold medal in the Oceania World Qualification Series in 2004. but missed the World Championship through injury. She had 17 caps with the Australian U21 Sapphires, which she led in scoring at the 2007 World Championships in Russia, netting 132 points in eight games to average 16.5 per game which was also fourth best in the tournament. She averaged 5.3 rebounds and 3.4 assists per game. The team won the silver medal.

=== WNBL ===
O'Hea played part of the 2005 season with the Australian Institute of Sport team in the Women's National Basketball League (WNBL), before joining the Dandenong Rangers for the 2005/2006 season, in which her team were runners up. She averaged 5.1 points per game and 2.8 rebounds per game this season, but had to deal with a foot injury. In the 2006/2007 season she played in the forward position for the Rangers. She avoided training during the early part of so as not to aggravate a foot injury. Nonetheless, in the first seven games of the season, she averaged 21.8 points and 5.6 rebounds per game. In one game against Bulleen, she scored 28 points. In those seven games, she only shot under 20 points only two times. Her team lost only in the two games she did not play. That season, she was coached by Gary Fox. In the team's 66–61 preliminary loss to the Adelaide Lightning, O'Hea scored 28 points and had a field goal percentage of 55%. She led the game in scoring.

She was with the Bendigo Spirit for the 2007/2008 season, and then played her first season with the Bulleen Boomers in 2009/2010. The Boomers were runners-up in the WNBL Grand Finals. She was described as a rising star in the WNBL in August 2010 by the Australian Broadcasting Corporation. For most of the 2010/2011 season, she dealt with two injuries, the first of which left her on the bench for four weeks. Her second was a knee injury. She finished the season with an average of 12 points per game, 4 rebounds and 5 assists per game. The Boomers won the championship that season and she was named to the WNBL All-Star Five. She played for the Dandenong Rangers in 2011/2012, again helping her team to win the WNBL's championship. She played for the Dandengong Rangers again in 2012, and re-signed with the team in May 2012 for the 2012/2013 season.

In March 2022, O'Hea announced her retirement from the WNBL.

=== Overseas ===
She played in France in 2008/2009 with Arras Pays d'Artois Basket Féminin in the Fédération Française de Basket-Ball, and in the American Women's National Basketball Association (WNBA) for the Los Angeles Sparks in the 2011–2013 seasons, before being traded to the Seattle Storm for the 2014 season.

== National team career ==
Lauren Jackson, Jenna O'Hea and Carrie Graf at a 14 May 2012 press conference at the Australian Institute of Sport

In March 2007, O'Hea was named to the national team what would prepare for the 2008 Summer Olympics. She participated in a week-long training camp with the national team in Canberra in late March and early April 2008, but did not make her Opals debut until 2009. She was named in the 2010 Opals World Championship Squad. In mid-2010, she participated in a tour of China, USA and Hungary, and in 2010, was a member of the senior women's national team that competed at the World Championships in the Czech Republic. She missed the Olympic qualification series in July 2011 because of WNBA commitments, but was named to the 2012 team. In February 2012, she was named to a short list of 24 eligible players to represent Australia at the 2012 London Olympics. Opals teammate Lauren Jackson named O'Hea and Belinda Snell as players who would step up after Penny Taylor was injured and ruled out for London.

O'Hea participated in the national team training camp held from 14 to 18 May 2012 at the Australian Institute of Sport. The local paper expected that she would be an Olympic starter in the 2012 Games. Opal players who make the team wear Dunlop Volleys shoes, which are highly coveted by O'Hea. In early May 2012, O'Hea and several of her national team teammates did a strength conditioning effort in the lead up to the mid-May training camp.

O'Hea, like all the other members of the 2020 Tokyo Olympics Opals women's basketball team, had a difficult tournament. The Opals lost their first two group stage matches. They looked flat against Belgium and then lost to China in heartbreaking circumstances. In their last group match the Opals needed to beat Puerto Rico by 25 or more in their final match to progress. This they did by 27 in a very exciting match. However, they lost to the United States in their quarterfinal 79 to 55.

== Career statistics ==
Legend
GP	Games played	GS	Games started	MPG	Minutes per game	RPG	Rebounds per game
APG	Assists per game	SPG	Steals per game	BPG	Blocks per game	PPG	Points per game
TO	Turnovers per game	FG%	Field-goal percentage	3P%	3-point field-goal percentage	FT%	Free-throw percentage
**Bold**	Career best	°	League leader

=== WNBA ===
==== Regular season ====
Year	Team	GP	GS	MPG	FG%	3P%	FT%	RPG	APG	SPG	BPG	TO	PPG
2011	Los Angeles	31	5	16.4	.434	.444	.786	1.5	1.3	0.3	0.1	0.8	4.8
2012	Los Angeles	8	0	18.0	**.520**	.500	.714	**2.5**	2.0	0.3	0.1	0.7	4.8
2013	Los Angeles	29	0	13.7	.438	**.500**	.667	1.3	1.0	0.4	0.3	**0.8**	3.0
2014	Seattle	29	0	13.4	.436	.403	.900	1.3	1.0	0.4	0.3	0.8	4.8
2015	Seattle	**34**	**14**	**20.9**	.381	.383	**.923**	1.9	**2.4**	**0.5**	0.2	1.1	**5.9**
2016	Seattle	22	2	11.5	.348	.316	.900	1.3	0.9	0.3	0.1	**0.6**	3.0
Career	6 years, 2 teams	153	21	15.7	.412	.411	.835	1.6	1.4	0.4	0.2	0.8	4.4

==== Postseason ====
Year	Team	GP	GS	MPG	FG%	3P%	FT%	RPG	APG	SPG	BPG	TO	PPG
2012	Los Angeles	**4**	0	**17.8**	.250	.200	**1.000**	**1.8**	**1.3**	0.2	0.0	1.2	2.3
2013	Los Angeles	2	0	11.9	**.333**	**.250**	.870	1.0	1.0	**0.5**	0.0	**1.0**	**3.0**
Career	2 years, 1 team	6	0	15.8	.286	.222	.833	1.5	1.2	0.3	0.0	1.2	2.5

== Personal life ==
Jenna O'Hea was born in Traralgon, Victoria on 6 June 1987, and was educated at Caulfield Grammar School in Melbourne, from which she graduated in 2006. She has two brothers, Matthew and Luke. Both have played basketball; Matt for the Melbourne Tigers, and her other and older brother Luke in Ireland. She is 185 centimetres (73 in) tall and weighs 79 kilograms (12 st 6 lb). Her best friend is Opals teammate Kathleen MacLeod. She currently sits on the board of the Australian Basketball Players’ Association

== See also ==
- List of Australian WNBA players
- List of Caulfield Grammar School people
- List of WNBA annual 3-point field goal percentage leaders
