= Suzy Batkovic =

Australian basketball player (born 1980)

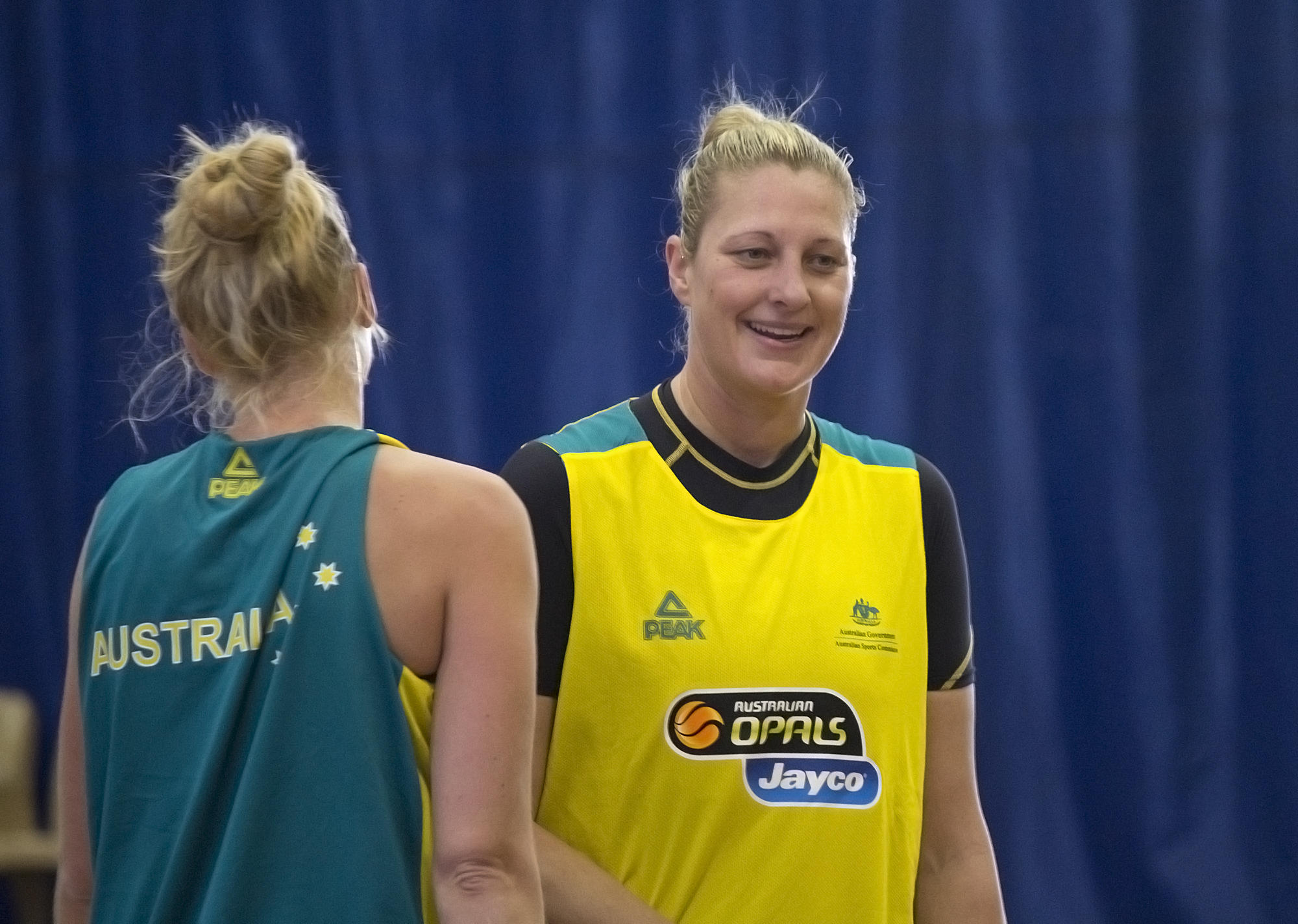

Councillor of the City of Townsville for Division 6
- Incumbent
- Assumed office 28 March 2020
- Preceded by: Verena Coombe

Personal details
- Born: Suzy Batkovic; 17 December 1980 (age 45) Newcastle, New South Wales, Australia
- Party: Team Jenny Hill
- Basketball career

Personal information
- Listed height: 193 cm (6 ft 4 in)
- Listed weight: 197 lb (89 kg)

Career information
- WNBA draft: 2003: 2nd round, 22nd overall pick
- Drafted by: Seattle Storm
- Playing career: 2003–2019
- Position: Center
- Number: 8

Career history
- 1996–1999: Australian Institute of Sport
- 1999–2001: Sydney Uni Flames
- 2001–2002: Townsville Fire
- 2005: Seattle Storm
- 2009: Seattle Storm
- 2009–2010: Sydney Uni Flames
- 2010–2011: Canberra Capitals
- 2011–2013: Adelaide Lightning
- 2013–2019: Townsville Fire

Career highlights
- 5× WNBL champion (1999, 2001, 2015, 2016, 2018); 6× WNBL Most Valuable Player (2012–2014, 2016-2018); 7× WNBL All-Star Five (2010, 2012–2014, 2016-2018); 4× WNBL Top Shooter (2010, 2012, 2013, 2016)
- Stats at WNBA.com
- Stats at Basketball Reference
Medals
Women's basketball
Representing Australia
Olympic Games
| Silver medal – second place | 2004 Athens | Team competition |
| Silver medal – second place | 2008 Beijing | Team competition |
| Bronze medal – third place | 2012 London | Team competition |

Suzy Batkovic (born 17 December 1980) is an Australian professional basketball player and politician. Suzy played her junior basketball with the Port Hunter Basketball Club in Newcastle. She has played basketball for several European clubs including the French Valenciennes, the Spanish side Ros Casares, the Russian side UMMC Ekaterinburg, and Italian side Cras Basket. In the United States, she has played for the Seattle Storm after having been selected as a first round draft pick in 2003. She has played professional basketball domestically for the Australian Institute of Sport in 1996–1999, the Sydney Uni Flames from 1999–2001, and 2009–2010, the Townsville Fire in 2001–2002, the Canberra Capitals in 2010–2011, and the Adelaide Lightning in 2011–2013; she returned to the Fire for the 2013–14 season. She has been a member of the Australia women's national basketball team, being named to the team for the first time in 1999. She won a silver medal with the team at the 2004 Summer Olympics and the 2008 Summer Olympics and a bronze medal at the 2012 Summer Olympics.

After retiring from professional basketball, Batkovic was elected as a Townsville City Councillor in 2020.

== Personal ==
Batkovic was born on 17 December 1980 in Newcastle, New South Wales. She is 192 centimetres (76 in) tall.

== Basketball ==
Batkovic is a forward and center. She has played professional basketball for over twenty years. She has won several basketball honours, including being named the 2001 Maher Medal International Player of the Year and the she co-won the 2008 co-winner for the Maher Medal International Player of the Year.

=== Europe ===
Batkovic has played basketball for several European clubs including the she played for the French side, Valenciennes in 2002/2003. That season, they won the French championships and finished at the top of the French League ladder. She played for Valenciennes again during the 2003/2004 season, the year the team won the EuroLeague Championship. For the 2004/2005, she played with the Spanish side Ros Casares. She was with a new side for the 2005/2006 season when she played for the Russian side UMMC Ekaterinburg. That season, she was named to the EuroLeague World All-Star team. In 2007/2008, she again played for Ekaterinburg, Russia. In 2008/2009, she played for the Italian side Cras Basket. She averaged 17.4 points and 7.0 rebounds per game for the season. Her team won the Italian Serie A championship. She earned being named first-team All-EuroCup while with the team.

=== WNBA ===
Batkovic was drafted by the Seattle Storm in 2003 and was 22nd pick overall. She was the only Australian drafted by the WNBA that year. Her friend Lauren Jackson was playing on the team at the time. She did play for the Seattle Storm in 2005. In 29 games where she came off the bench to average 15.9 minutes per game, she averaged 6.9 points per game and 3.2 rebounds per game. At that stage, coming back wasn't something I wanted to do in my life. Europe is what I focus on for eight months out of the year." That season, she played 461 total minutes, had 76 total field goals, had 174 total field goal attempts, made 45 total free throws on 58 attempts, had 94 total rebounds of which 26 were offensive and 68 defensive. She finished the season with an efficiency rating of 17.7. She took a year off from WNBA basketball in 2008 because of an injury. She signed with the Seattle Storm again in February 2009. Lauren Jackson was instrumental in her decision to sign with the team.

=== WNBL ===
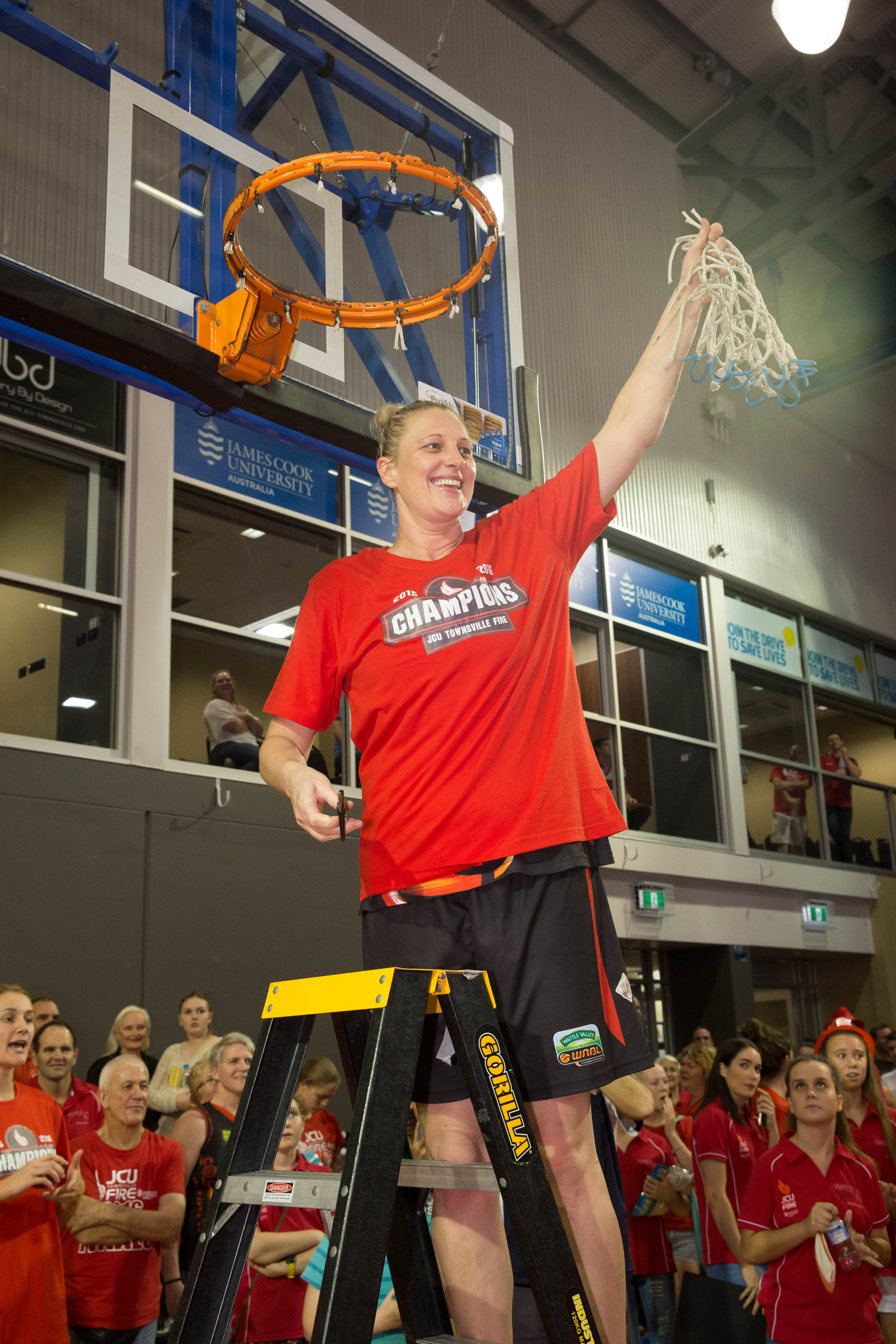
Townsville Fire captain Suzy Batkovic cutting down the game net following the club's WNBL Grand Final victory at Townsville RSL Stadium, 18 March 2016

Batkovic had a scholarship with and played for the Australian Institute of Sport in 1996, 1997 and 1998/1999. She won a WNBL Championship with the team during the 1998/1999 season. She played for the Sydney Panthers in 1999/2000 and 2000/2001 seasons, winning WNBL Championship in 2000/2001. She played for the Townsville Fire in 2001/2002. She played for the Sydney Uni Flames during the 2009/2010 season. That season, she was named to the WNBL's All-Star Five. She was the league's Top Shooter, averaging 24.6 points per game. In a 101-49 win for her team over the Australian Institute of Sport, she scored 21 points. In an October 2009 game against the Adelaide Lightning, she scored 29 points. In an October 2009 game against the AIS, she had 21 points, nine rebounds, five assists and three blocks. Her field goal percentage in the AIS game was 40%. She went 9 for 10 at the free throw line. She joined the Canberra Capitals for the 2010/2011 season, missing several games early in the season due to injury. She was named the WNBL player of the week in rounds 12 and 17. The team were runners up in the league's Grand Finals. She played for the Adelaide Lightning in 2011/2012. In an October 2011 game against the Australian Institute of Sport, she scored 22 points in a 97-47 win for Adelaide. Her team lost to the Dandenong Rangers in the preliminary finals. She played centre this season. She was the WNBL League MVP in 2011/2012. She was also named to the WNBL's All-Star Five. This was only the second time in her WNBL career she had earned this honour.

Batkovic repeated as both an All-Star Five member and league MVP in the 2012–13 season. At the end of that season, she became a free agent, and signed a contract to return to the Townsville Fire for the 2013–14 season.

=== National team ===
Batkovic played in her first international for Australia in 1999 and has over 110 caps for the Australian senior team. Batkovic had her first call up to the Australian senior women's team in 1999, and continued to be on the team during 2000 and 2001. As a member of the 2001 team, she earned a gold medal at the FIBA Oceania Women's Championship.

Batkovic was a member of the 2002 Australian Senior Women's Team that won a bronze medal in the World Championships in Spain. In 2003, she was a member of the Australian Women's Senior Team that competed in the Oceania Championship Series. She was again with the team in 2005 and 2006. She was injured in 2006, which prevented her from making the national squad that competed at the World Championships in Brazil. She continued to be named to the squad during 2007, 2008, 2009, 2010, 2011 and 2012. In late July 2011, she played in a three-game test series against China played in Queensland. She had 12 points and 9 points in the first game against China that Australia won 73-67. She played in September 2011 three game test series against New Zealand. She was a major factor in the Australian's first game win. In the second game, which Australia won 92-73 in Sydney, she scored 19 points overall, 11 coming in the first half. She won a gold medal at the 2011 FIBA Oceania Championship. She was named to the 2012 Australia women's national basketball team. In February 2012, she was named to a short list of 24 eligible players to represent Australia at the Olympics. In late April and early May 2012, she was one of four Australian "big" players to participate in a special training camp for the team. She participated in the national team training camp held from 14 to 18 May 2012 at the Australian Institute of Sport.

==== Olympics ====
She has represented Australia at the Olympics. She was a member of the Australian senior team that won a silver medal at the 2004 Summer Olympics. In March 2007, she was named to the national team what would prepare for the 2008 Summer Olympics. In 2008, she participated in the Good Luck Beijing 2008 held in China in the lead up to the Olympics. Her team was joined by national teams from United States, Cuba, Korea, New Zealand and China. She was a member of the 2008 Summer Olympics Australian women's team that won a silver medal at the Olympics. In July 2011, she participated in the Olympic qualification competition. She had not played a game with the team prior to this dating back to the Beijing Olympics. She played in the 2012 Summer Olympic qualifying game against the New Zealand women's national basketball team.

== Career statistics ==
Legend
| GP | Games played | GS | Games started | MPG | Minutes per game | RPG | Rebounds per game |
| APG | Assists per game | SPG | Steals per game | BPG | Blocks per game | PPG | Points per game |
| TO | Turnovers per game | FG% | Field-goal percentage | 3P% | 3-point field-goal percentage | FT% | Free-throw percentage |
| **Bold** | Career best | ° | League leader |

=== WNBA ===
==== Regular season ====
WNBA regular season statistics
| Year | Team | GP | GS | MPG | FG% | 3P% | FT% | RPG | APG | SPG | BPG | TO | PPG |
|---|---|---|---|---|---|---|---|---|---|---|---|---|---|
| 2003 | Did not appear in league | | | | | | | | | | | | |
| 2004 | Did not play (Olympic prioritization) | | | | | | | | | | | | |
| 2005 | Seattle | **29** | 0 | **15.9** | .437 | **.286** | **.776** | **3.2** | **0.9** | **0.6** | **0.8** | **1.1** | **6.9** |
| 2006 | Did not appear in league | | | | | | | | | | | | |
| 2007 | Did not appear in league | | | | | | | | | | | | |
| 2008 | Did not play (injury) | | | | | | | | | | | | |
| 2009 | Seattle | 20 | 0 | 7.4 | **.488** | .273 | .250 | 1.5 | 0.2 | 0.3 | 0.3 | 1.2 | 2.4 |
| **Career** | 2 years, 1 team | 49 | 0 | 12.4 | .447 | .278 | .712 | 2.5 | 0.6 | 0.4 | 0.6 | 1.1 | 5.0 |

==== Playoffs ====
WNBA playoff statistics
| Year | Team | GP | GS | MPG | FG% | 3P% | FT% | RPG | APG | SPG | BPG | TO | PPG |
|---|---|---|---|---|---|---|---|---|---|---|---|---|---|
| 2005 | Seattle | **3** | 0 | 14.3 | **.500** | — | .500 | **3.3** | 0.0 | 0.0 | 0.7 | **1.7** | 4.7 |
| 2009 | Seattle | **3** | 0 | **28.7** | **.500** | .538 | **.750** | **3.3** | 0.0 | **1.3** | **2.3** | 2.3 | **12.7** |
| **Career** | 2 years, 1 team | 6 | 0 | 21.5 | .500 | .538 | .556 | 3.3 | 0.0 | 0.7 | 1.5 | 2.0 | 8.7 |

== See also ==
- List of Australian WNBA players
