= State Basketball Centre =

Sports arena in Melbourne, Victoria

Coordinates: 37°52′50.322″S 145°12′42.029″E

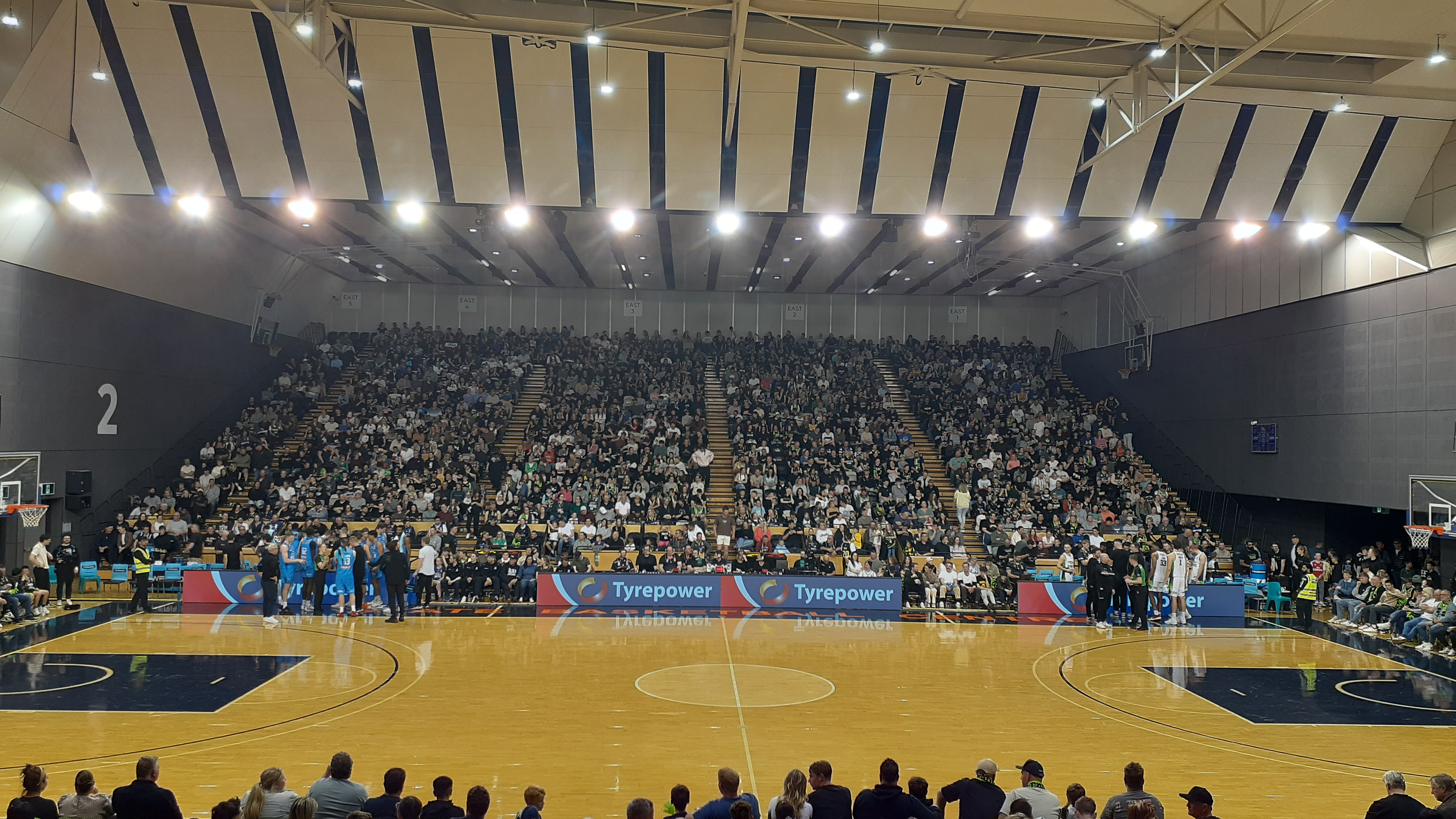
- The SBC's show court, August 2024
- Interactive map of State Basketball Centre
- Location: Wantirna South, Victoria, Australia
- Capacity: 3,200; 3,422 (basketball)

Construction
- Groundbreaking: 2011
- Opened: 22 June 2012
- Cost: A$27m

Tenants
- Knox Raiders (NBL1 South) (2012–present); Melbourne Boomers (WNBL) (2013–2023); Southside Flyers (WNBL) (2022–present); South East Melbourne Phoenix (NBL) (2019–present)

The State Basketball Centre is a sports arena located in Melbourne, Victoria, Australia, used primarily for basketball. The stadium features 18 courts, including one basketball show court with seating for 3,200. The stadium houses the offices of Basketball Australia, Basketball Victoria, Knox Basketball Incorporated, and South East Melbourne Phoenix.

It is the host venue for NBL1 South Grand Finals, as well as WNBL home games for the Southside Flyers. The stadium also hosts at least three regular season South East Melbourne Phoenix home games each NBL season, as well as at least one pre-season game.

== History ==
In March 2021, the State Basketball Centre hosted four games as part of the NBL Cup.

In September 2022, the State Basketball Centre hosted the NBL1 National Finals.

In January 2024, the stadium unveiled 12 new basketball courts following a $132 million upgrade, increasing the total number to 18 courts. Following the opening of the new courts, works began on refurbishing the original six courts including the show court, which led to the Southside Flyers being unable to host their 2024 WNBL finals games at the State Basketball Centre.

In January 2025, the stadium had a sellout crowd of 3,422 at the Phoenix's game against the Tasmania JackJumpers.

Gallery

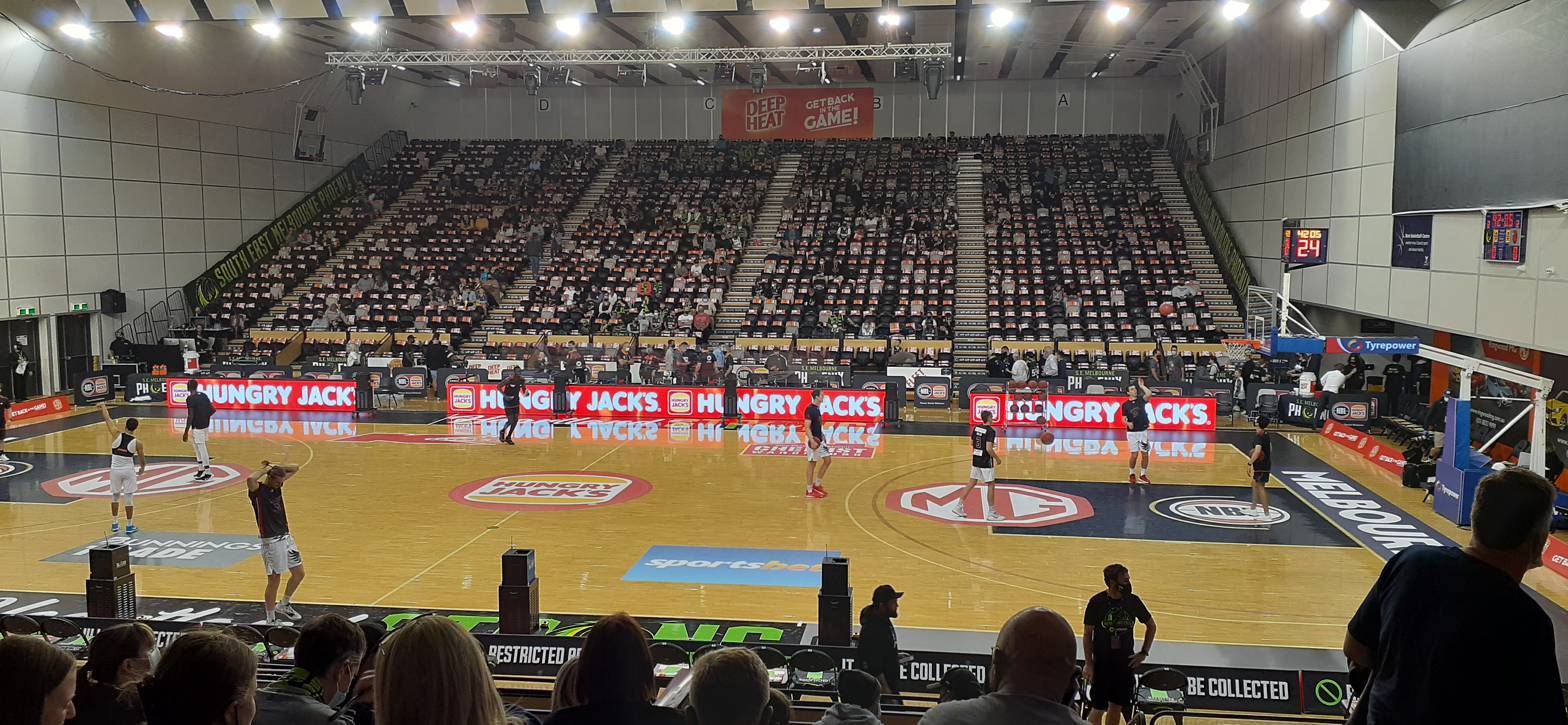
The State Basketball Centre before Phoenix vs The Hawks - 7 February 2021

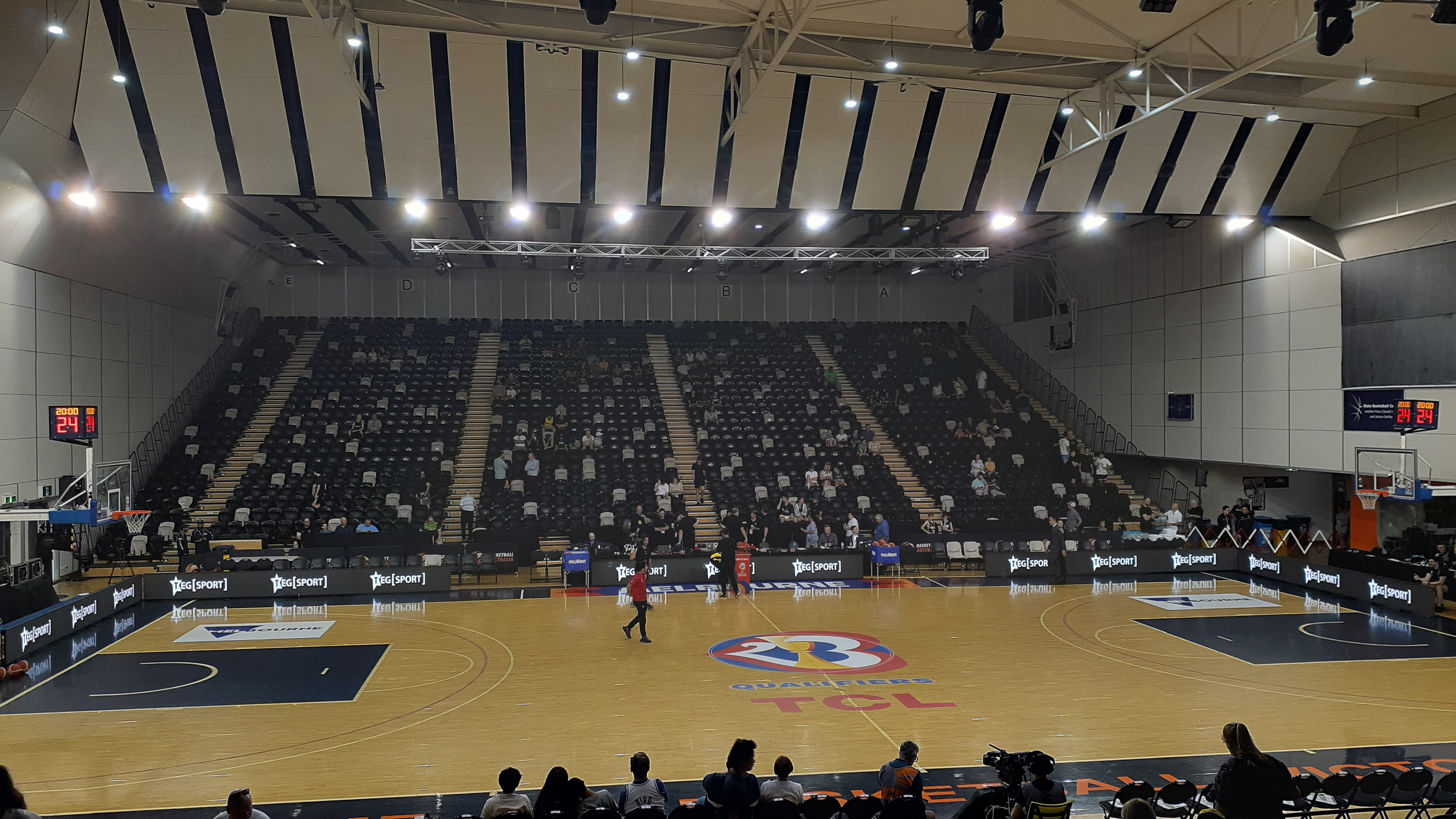
State Basketball Centre before a FIBA World Cup Qualifier Match - 23 February 2023
