= 2019–20 WNBL Finals =

2020 WNBL Finals
Team	Coach	Wins
Canberra Capitals	Paul Goriss	2
Southside Flyers	Cheryl Chambers	0
- Dates: 16 February – March 2020
- MVP: Olivia Époupa (CBR)
- Preliminary final: Southside def. Adelaide, 2–0; Canberra def. Melbourne, 2–1

The 2020 WNBL Finals is the postseason tournament of the WNBL's 2019–20 season. The Canberra Capitals were the defending champions and they successfully defended their title, taking home their ninth WNBL Championship.

The WNBL Finals schedule was announced 2 February 2020.

== Standings ==
#	WNBL Championship ladder				
#	Team	W	L	PCT	GP
1	Southside Flyers	17	4	80.9	21
2	Canberra Capitals	15	6	71.4	21
3	Melbourne Boomers	15	6	71.4	21
4	Adelaide Lightning	12	9	57.1	21
5	Perth Lynx	8	13	38.0	21
6	Sydney Uni Flames	7	14	33.3	21
7	Bendigo Spirit	5	16	23.8	21
8	Townsville Fire	5	16	23.8	21

== Bracket ==
Semifinals
1	Southside Flyers	2
4	Adelaide Lightning	0
3	Melbourne Boomers	1
2	Canberra Capitals	2

Grand Final
1	Southside Flyers	0
2	Canberra Capitals	2

== Semi-finals ==
=== (1) Southside Flyers vs. (4) Adelaide Lightning ===
18 February 2020
7:30 PM (AEDT)

Boxscore

Southside Flyers	68–65	Adelaide Lightning
Scoring by quarter: 17–25, 17–14, 22–7, 12–19
Pts: Russell 20; Rebs: Russell 19; Asts: Cole, Mitchell 4		Pts: Nicholson 14; Rebs: Talbot, Turner 9 Asts: Talbot 6

Dandenong Stadium, Dandenong, Victoria
Attendance: 1,269
Referees: Calia Hanks, Jason Kelly, Jack Taylor

22 February 2020
7:00 PM (ACDT)

Boxscore

Adelaide Lightning	79–82	Southside Flyers
Scoring by quarter: 26–27, 17–24, 20–15, 16–16
Pts: Turner 25; Rebs: Turner 18; Asts: Seekamp 11		Pts: Cole 19; Rebs: Cole 10; Asts: Mitchell 9
Southside win series, 2–0

Titanium Security Arena, Adelaide, South Australia
Attendance: 1,806
Referees: Craig Copes, Madi Crowley-Long, Shahrad Shafaghi

=== (2) Canberra Capitals vs. (3) Melbourne Boomers ===
16 February 2020
5:30 PM (AEDT)

Boxscore

Canberra Capitals	84–70	Melbourne Boomers
Scoring by quarter: 23–22, 16–17, 18–16, 27–15
Pts: Nurse 25; Rebs: Griffin 12; Asts: Époupa 6		Pts: Allen 17; Rebs: George 8 Asts: Allen 5

AIS Arena, Canberra, Australian Capital Territory
Attendance: 2,492
Referees: Daniel Battye, Vanessa Devlin, Jacqui Dover

23 February 2020
6:00 PM (AEDT)

Boxscore

Melbourne Boomers	88–76	Canberra Capitals
Scoring by quarter: 23–18, 26–16, 15–16, 24–26
Pts: Allen 25; Rebs: Magbegor 9 Asts: George 5		Pts: Griffin, Nurse 17; Rebs: Froling, Griffin 7 Asts: Nurse 4

State Basketball Centre, Melbourne, Victoria
Attendance: 3,116
Referees: James Griguol, Guy Richards, Kylie Voevodin

26 February 2020
7:30 PM (AEDT)

Boxscore

Canberra Capitals	77–64	Melbourne Boomers
Scoring by quarter: 22–16, 15–12, 22–22, 18–14
Pts: Tolo 20; Rebs: Griffin 9 Asts: Époupa 9		Pts: Cunningham 14; Rebs: George 12; Asts: George 4
Canberra win series, 2–1

AIS Arena, Canberra, Australian Capital Territory
Attendance: 2,201
Referees: Daniel Battye, Jason Kelly, Madi Crowley-Long

== Grand Final ==
=== (1) Southside Flyers vs. (2) Canberra Capitals ===
1 March 2020
5:00 PM (AEDT)

Boxscore

Southside Flyers	80–82	Canberra Capitals
Scoring by quarter: 20–22, 27–21, 22–20, 11–19
Pts: Cole 23; Rebs: Russell 9 Asts: Cole 7		Pts: Nurse 19; Rebs: Griffin 12; Asts: Époupa 6

Dandenong Stadium, Dandenong, Victoria
Attendance: 1,956
Referees: Craig Copes, Jack Taylor, Kylie Voevodin

4 March 2020
7:30 PM (AEDT)

Boxscore

Canberra Capitals	71–68	Southside Flyers
Scoring by quarter: 16–24, 19–21, 21–9, 15–14
Pts: Tolo 19; Rebs: Griffin 13; Asts: Époupa 11		Pts: Cole 23; Rebs: Russell 13; Asts: Cole, O'Hea 3
Canberra win series, 2–0

AIS Arena, Canberra, Australian Capital Territory
Attendance: 4,481
Referees: James Griguol, Jason Kelly, Guy Richards

=== Rosters ===
2019–20 Southside Flyers roster
Players
Coaches

Pos.	No.	Nat.	Name	Ht.
G	1	(Australia)	Cole, Rebecca	1.78 m (5 ft 10 in)
C	2	(Australia)	Tomlinson, Louella	1.93 m (6 ft 4 in)
G	3	(Australia)	Clydesdale, Aimie	1.78 m (5 ft 10 in)
G/F	4	(Australia)	O'Hea, Jenna (C)	1.87 m (6 ft 2 in)
G	5	(Australia)	Mitchell, Leilani	1.65 m (5 ft 5 in)
F	8	(Australia)	Pizzey, Rebecca	1.90 m (6 ft 3 in)
F	10	(Australia)	Rowe, Kiera	1.80 m (5 ft 11 in)
G	11	(Australia)	O'Neill, Amy	1.68 m (5 ft 6 in)
G	12	(Australia)	Reid, Stephanie	1.68 m (5 ft 6 in)
F	15	(Australia)	Blicavs, Sara	1.89 m (6 ft 2 in)
C	21	(United States)	Russell, Mercedes	1.98 m (6 ft 6 in)
G/F	24	(Australia)	Maley, Anneli	1.88 m (6 ft 2 in)

Head coach

- (Australia) Cheryl Chambers

Assistant coach(es)

- (Australia) Belinda Snell

Legend

- (C) Team captain
- (DP) Development player
- (I) Import player
- Injured

2019–20 Canberra Capitals roster
Players
Coaches

Pos.	No.	Nat.	Name	Ht.
G	0	(France)	Époupa, Olivia	1.65 m (5 ft 5 in)
G	5	(Australia)	Reilly, Shakera	1.78 m (5 ft 10 in)
G	6	(Australia)	Scanlon, Lily	1.75 m (5 ft 9 in)
G	8	(Australia)	Cubillo, Abby	1.61 m (5 ft 3 in)
G	9	(Australia)	Rocci, Maddison	1.68 m (5 ft 6 in)
G	11	(Canada)	Nurse, Kia	1.83 m (6 ft 0 in)
C	12	(Australia)	Tolo, Marianna (C)	1.96 m (6 ft 5 in)
F	14	(Australia)	Delaney, Alex	1.83 m (6 ft 0 in)
F	21	(Australia)	Froling, Keely	1.88 m (6 ft 2 in)
F	23	(Australia)	Griffin, Kelsey (C)	1.88 m (6 ft 2 in)

Head coach

- (Australia) Paul Goriss

Assistant coach(es)

- (Australia) Carly Wilson
- (Australia) Kristen Veal
- (Australia) Jenny Lonergan

Legend

- (C) Team captain
- (DP) Development player
- (I) Import player
- Injured
