= 2019–20 Canberra Capitals season =

- Head Coach: Paul Goriss
- Captain: Kelsey Griffin; Marianna Tolo (co)
- Venue: National Convention Centre

Results
- Record: 15–6
- Ladder: 2nd
- Finals: WNBL Champions (defeated Southside, 2–0)

Leaders
- Points: Nurse (21.3)
- Rebounds: Griffin (10.9)
- Assists: Époupa (6.7)

The 2019–20 Canberra Capitals season was the 36th season for the franchise in the Women's National Basketball League (WNBL). The Capitals were the defending champions and they successfully defended their title, taking home their ninth championship with a 2–0 win over the Southside Flyers.

University of Canberra remain as the owners and naming rights partner of the Capitals.

== Roster ==
2019–20 Canberra Capitals roster
Players
Coaches

Pos.	No.	Nat.	Name	Ht.
G	0	(France)	Époupa, Olivia	1.65 m (5 ft 5 in)
G	4	(Australia)	Wallace, Kristy	1.80 m (5 ft 11 in)
G	8	(Australia)	Cubillo, Abby	1.61 m (5 ft 3 in)
G	9	(Australia)	Rocci, Maddison	1.68 m (5 ft 6 in)
F	10	(Australia)	Potter, Gemma	1.82 m (6 ft 0 in)
G	11	(Canada)	Nurse, Kia	1.83 m (6 ft 0 in)
C	12	(Australia)	Tolo, Marianna (C)	1.96 m (6 ft 5 in)
F	14	(Australia)	Delaney, Alex	1.83 m (6 ft 0 in)
F	21	(Australia)	Froling, Keely	1.88 m (6 ft 2 in)
F	23	(Australia)	Griffin, Kelsey (C)	1.88 m (6 ft 2 in)

Head coach

- (Australia) Paul Goriss

Assistant coach(es)

- (Australia) Carly Wilson
- (Australia) Kristen Veal
- (Australia) Jenny Lonergan

Legend

- (C) Team captain
- (DP) Development player
- (I) Import player
- Injured

- Roster
Updated: 16 January 2019

== Standings ==
#	WNBL Championship ladder				
#	Team	W	L	PCT	GP
1	Southside Flyers	17	4	80.9	21
2	Canberra Capitals	15	6	71.4	21
3	Melbourne Boomers	15	6	71.4	21
4	Adelaide Lightning	12	9	57.1	21
5	Perth Lynx	8	13	38.0	21
6	Sydney Uni Flames	7	14	33.3	21
7	Bendigo Spirit	5	16	23.8	21
8	Townsville Fire	5	16	23.8	21

== Results ==
=== Pre-season ===
Game	Date	Team	Score	High points	High rebounds	High assists	Location	Record
1	September; 14	Aisin AW Wings	97–56	Froling (35)	Froling (17)	–	Belconnen Basketball Stadium	1–0
2	September; 16	China	97–62	Froling (39)	Froling (12)	Cubillo (6)	Tuggeranong Basketball Stadium	2–0

=== Regular season ===
Game	Date	Team	Score	High points	High rebounds	High assists	Location	Record
1	October; 13	Adelaide	90–83	Nurse (28)	Griffin (20)	Époupa (8)	AIS Arena	1–0
2	October; 20	Townsville	67–65	Griffin, Nurse (16)	Griffin (13)	Époupa, Griffin (4)	National Convention Centre	2–0
3	October; 25	@ Melbourne	72–107	Froling (14)	Griffin (10)	Époupa (4)	Geelong Arena	2–1
4	October; 27	@ Sydney	75–81	Nurse (21)	Tolo (9)	Époupa, Griffin (4)	Brydens Stadium	2–2
5	November; 2	Sydney	91–66	Nurse (21)	Tolo (9)	Époupa (10)	AIS Arena	3–2
6	November; 7	@ Southside	91–72	Nurse (21)	Griffin (13)	Époupa (7)	Dandenong Stadium	4–2
7	November; 9	@ Melbourne	79–76	Nurse (22)	Griffin (9)	Époupa (8)	State Basketball Centre	5–2
8	November; 24	Perth	84–66	Griffin (19)	Griffin (15)	Époupa, Nurse (6)	National Convention Centre	6–2
9	November; 30	Townsville	87–78	Griffin (27)	Époupa, Griffin (7)	Époupa (6)	National Convention Centre	7–2
10	December; 6	@ Bendigo	91–66	Nurse (32)	Griffin (12)	Époupa (6)	Bendigo Stadium	8–2
11	December; 15	Southside	65–70	Tolo (16)	Griffin (12)	Époupa (7)	National Convention Centre	8–3
12	December; 21	Bendigo	76–66	Froling (30)	Époupa (12)	Époupa (5)	National Convention Centre	9–3
13	December; 27	@ Adelaide	68–78 (OT)	Tolo (22)	Époupa, Tolo (12)	Nurse (5)	Titanium Security Arena	9–4
14	December; 29	@ Perth	76–59	Nurse (23)	Époupa (14)	Époupa (7)	Bendat Basketball Centre	10–4
15	January; 3	@ Bendigo	90–94	Tolo (26)	Tolo (17)	Époupa (11)	Bendigo Stadium	10–5
16	January; 10	@ Townsville	69–102	Nurse, Tolo (17)	Froling (10)	Époupa (8)	Townsville Stadium	10–6
17	January; 17	Melbourne	76–75 (OT)	Nurse (23)	Époupa (16)	Époupa (7)	National Convention Centre	11–6
18	January; 19	@ Southside	98–74	Nurse (33)	Époupa (13)	Époupa (8)	Dandenong Stadium	12–6
19	January; 22	Perth	89–75	Tolo (22)	Tolo (9)	Époupa (8)	National Convention Centre	13–6
20	January; 26	Sydney	82–66	Nurse (25)	Griffin, Tolo (7)	Époupa (8)	National Convention Centre	14–6
21	February; 1	Adelaide	73–71	Nurse (28)	Griffin (10)	Griffin (7)	National Convention Centre	15–6

=== Finals ===
==== Semi-finals ====
Game	Date	Team	Score	High points	High rebounds	High assists	Location	Series
1	February; 16	Melbourne	84–70	Nurse (25)	Griffin (12)	Époupa (6)	AIS Arena	1–0
2	February; 23	@ Melbourne	76–88	Griffin, Nurse (17)	Froling, Griffin (7)	Nurse (4)	State Basketball Centre	1–1
3	February; 26	Melbourne	77–64	Tolo (20)	Griffin (9)	Époupa (9)	AIS Arena	2–1

==== Grand Final ====
Game	Date	Team	Score	High points	High rebounds	High assists	Location	Series
1	March; 1	Southside	82–80	Nurse (19)	Griffin (12)	Époupa (6)	Dandenong Stadium	1–0
2	March; 4	@ Southside	71–68	Tolo (19)	Griffin (13)	Époupa (11)	AIS Arena	2–0

== Awards ==
=== In-season ===
Award	Recipient	Round(s)	Ref.
Player of the Week	Kelsey Griffin	Round 1	
Player of the Week	Kia Nurse	Rounds 3 & 9	
Team of the Week	Kelsey Griffin	Rounds 1, 5, 6 & 7	
Team of the Week	Kia Nurse	Rounds 1, 5, 8, 14, 15 & 16	
Team of the Week	Olivia Époupa	Rounds 4, 11 & 14	
Team of the Week	Keely Froling	Round 10	
Team of the Week	Marianna Tolo	Round 11	
Team of the Week	Maddison Rocci	Round 15	

=== Post-season ===
Award	Recipient	Date	Ref.
Top Shooter Award	Kia Nurse	3 February 2020	
Most Valuable Player	Kia Nurse	14 February 2020	
All-WNBL First Team	Kia Nurse	17 February 2020	
Coach of the Year	Paul Goriss	17 February 2020	
Grand Final MVP	Olivia Époupa	4 March 2020	

=== Club Awards ===
Award	Recipient	Date	Ref.
Most Valuable Player	Kia Nurse	10 March 2020	
Best Defensive Player	Olivia Époupa	10 March 2020	
Players Player	Marianna Tolo	10 March 2020	
Capital on the Rise Award	Abby Cubillo	10 March 2020	
