= 2019 WNBL Finals =

Basketball tournament season in Australia

Team	Coach	Wins
Canberra Capitals	Paul Goriss	2
Adelaide Lightning	Chris Lucas	1
- Dates: 25 January – February 2019
- MVP: Kelsey Griffin (CAN)
- Preliminary final: Canberra def. Perth, 2–0; Adelaide def. Melbourne, 2–0

The 2019 WNBL Finals was the postseason tournament of the WNBL's 2018–19 season. The Townsville Fire were the defending champions, however they failed to qualify for the finals series.

== Standings ==
#	WNBL Championship ladder				
#	Team	W	L	PCT	GP
1	Canberra Capitals	16	5	76.1	21
2	Melbourne Boomers	15	6	71.4	21
3	Adelaide Lightning	13	8	61.9	21
4	Perth Lynx	13	8	61.9	21
5	Dandenong Rangers	9	12	42.8	21
6	Townsville Fire	9	12	42.8	21
7	Bendigo Spirit	7	14	33.3	21
8	Sydney Uni Flames	2	19	9.5	21

== Bracket ==
Semifinals
1	Canberra Capitals	2
4	Perth Lynx	0
3	Adelaide Lightning	2
2	Melbourne Boomers	0

Grand Final
1	Canberra Capitals	2
3	Adelaide Lightning	1

== Semi-finals ==
=== (1) Canberra Capitals vs. (4) Perth Lynx ===
25 January 2019
7:00 PM (AEDT)

Boxscore

Canberra Capitals	95–76	Perth Lynx
Scoring by quarter: 28–16, 10–27, 34–13, 23–20
Pts: Nurse 31; Rebs: Griffin 12; Asts: Griffin, Mitchell, Wilson 7		Pts: McPhee 25; Rebs: McPhee 8 Asts: Farnworth 4

AIS Arena, Canberra, Australian Capital Territory
Attendance: 2,212
Referees: Craig Copes, Vanessa Devlin, Jason Kelly

31 January 2019
6:30 PM (AWST)

Boxscore

Perth Lynx	75–91	Canberra Capitals
Scoring by quarter: 23–14, 12–28, 23–17, 17–32
Pts: Ebzery, Schwagmeyer 17; Rebs: McPhee 19; Asts: Allen, Ebzery 4		Pts: Nurse 27; Rebs: Griffin 13; Asts: Wilson 12
Canberra win series, 2–0

Bendat Basketball Centre, Perth, Western Australia
Attendance: 1,155
Referees: Craig Copes, Vanessa Devlin, Jason Kelly

=== (2) Melbourne Boomers vs. (3) Adelaide Lightning ===
27 January 2019
5:00 PM (AEDT)

Boxscore

Melbourne Boomers	60–76	Adelaide Lightning
Scoring by quarter: 15–11, 20–24, 13–21, 12–20
Pts: Magbegor 14; Rebs: George 12; Asts: Allen 5		Pts: Seekamp 18; Rebs: Alexander 11; Asts: Seekamp 6

State Basketball Centre, Melbourne, Victoria
Attendance: 2,213
Referees: Daniel Battye, Sarah Carey, Guy Richards

31 January 2019
7:00 PM (ACDT)

Boxscore

Adelaide Lightning	100–92	Melbourne Boomers
Scoring by quarter: 25–22, 22–26, 29–21, 24–23
Pts: Coffey 30; Rebs: Alexander, Coffey 9 Asts: Seekamp 12		Pts: Allen 29; Rebs: George 9 Asts: Allen 6
Adelaide win series, 2–0

Titanium Security Arena, Adelaide, South Australia
Attendance: 1,017
Referees: Daniel Battye, Sarah Carey, Guy Richards

== Grand Final ==
=== (1) Canberra Capitals vs. (3) Adelaide Lightning ===
9 February 2019
5:30PM (AEDT)

Boxscore

Canberra Capitals	88–67	Adelaide Lightning
Scoring by quarter: 18–25, 30–13, 20–18, 20–11
Pts: Nurse 23; Rebs: Griffin 12; Asts: Mitchell 8		Pts: Nicholson 21; Rebs: Coffey 11; Asts: Seekamp 8

AIS Arena, Canberra, Australian Capital Territory
Attendance: 4,120
Referees: Sarah Carey, Vanessa Devlin, Jason Kelly

13 February 2019
6:30PM (ACDT)

Boxscore

Adelaide Lightning	74–73	Canberra Capitals
Scoring by quarter: 19–23, 18–21, 18–12, 19–17
Pts: Seekamp 19; Rebs: Alexander 11; Asts: Seekamp 5		Pts: Griffin 24; Rebs: Griffin 23; Asts: Mitchell 9

Titanium Security Arena, Adelaide, South Australia
Attendance: 3,702
Referees: Craig Copes, Vanessa Devlin, Jason Kelly

16 February 2019
5:00PM (AEDT)

Boxscore

Canberra Capitals	93–73	Adelaide Lightning
Scoring by quarter: 25–24, 24–21, 25–17, 19–11
Pts: Griffin 29; Rebs: Griffin 15; Asts: Mitchell 6		Pts: Planeta 15; Rebs: Alexander 7 Asts: Coffey, Nicholson 3
Canberra win series, 2–1

AIS Arena, Canberra, Australian Capital Territory
Attendance: 4,817
Referees: Daniel Battye, Craig Copes, Jason Kelly

=== Rosters ===
2018–19 Canberra Capitals roster
Players
Coaches

Pos.	No.	Nat.	Name	Ht.
F	2	(Australia)	Young, Hannah	1.85 m (6 ft 1 in)
G	5	(Australia)	Mitchell, Leilani	1.65 m (5 ft 5 in)
C	7	(Australia)	Scherf, Lauren	1.96 m (6 ft 5 in)
G	8	(Australia)	Cubillo, Abby	1.61 m (5 ft 3 in)
G	9	(Australia)	Rocci, Maddison	1.68 m (5 ft 6 in)
G	11	(Canada)	Nurse, Kia	1.83 m (6 ft 0 in)
C	12	(Australia)	Tolo, Marianna (C)	1.96 m (6 ft 5 in)
F	21	(Australia)	Froling, Keely	1.88 m (6 ft 2 in)
G	22	(Australia)	Wilson, Kelly	1.70 m (5 ft 7 in)
F	23	(Australia)	Griffin, Kelsey (C)	1.88 m (6 ft 2 in)
G	25	(Australia)	Loader, Eliza-Jane	1.73 m (5 ft 8 in)
F	41	(United States)	McLaren, Kaili	1.88 m (6 ft 2 in)

Head coach

- (Australia) Paul Goriss

Assistant coach(es)

- (Australia) Phil Brown
- (Australia) Carly Wilson
- (Australia) Bec Goddard

Legend

- (C) Team captain
- (DP) Development player
- (I) Import player
- Injured

- Roster
Updated: 9 February 2019

2018–19 Adelaide Lightning roster
Players
Coaches

Pos.	No.	Nat.	Name	Ht.
G	1	(Australia)	Nicholson, Lauren	1.80 m (5 ft 11 in)
G/F	3	(Australia)	Taia, Ashley	1.82 m (6 ft 0 in)
G	5	(Australia)	Clydesdale, Aimie	1.78 m (5 ft 10 in)
G	6	(Australia)	Blicavs, Stephanie (C)	1.78 m (5 ft 10 in)
F/C	8	(Australia)	Brook, Chelsea	1.88 m (6 ft 2 in)
G	9	(Australia)	Pirini, Mikayla	1.69 m (5 ft 7 in)
F	11	(New Zealand)	Davidson, Penina	1.90 m (6 ft 3 in)
G	12	(United States)	Coffey, Nia	1.85 m (6 ft 1 in)
G	22	(Australia)	Porter, Ruby	1.78 m (5 ft 10 in)
G	35	(Australia)	Seekamp, Nicole (C)	1.78 m (5 ft 10 in)
C	40	(Canada)	Alexander, Kayla	1.93 m (6 ft 4 in)
F	42	(United States)	Planeta, Colleen	1.88 m (6 ft 2 in)

Head coach

- (Australia) Chris Lucas

Assistant coach(es)

- (Australia) Jason Chainey
- (Australia) Marcus Wong

Legend

- (C) Team captain
- (DP) Development player
- (I) Import player
- Injured

- Roster
Updated: 9 February 2019
