= 2019–20 Sydney Uni Flames season =

- Head Coach: Katrina Hibbert
- Captain: Sarah Graham
- Venue: Brydens Stadium

Results
- Record: 7–14
- Ladder: 6th
- Finals: Did not qualify

Leaders
- Points: Kunek (18.9)
- Rebounds: Scherf (8.0)
- Assists: Wilson (5.0)

The 2019–20 Sydney Uni Flames season is the 40th season for the franchise in the Women's National Basketball League (WNBL).

Brydens Lawyers remain as the Flames' naming rights sponsor for the seventh consecutive season.

== Roster ==
2019–20 Sydney Uni Flames roster
Players
Coaches

| Pos. | No. | Nat. | Name | Ht. |
|---|---|---|---|---|
| F | 1 | (Australia) | Kunek, Alice | 1.86 m (6 ft 1 in) |
| G | 3 | (United States) | Smart, Brittany | 1.70 m (5 ft 7 in) |
| G | 4 | (Australia) | Tupaea, Tahlia | 1.75 m (5 ft 9 in) |
| F | 7 | (Australia) | Hodge, Kim | 1.82 m (6 ft 0 in) |
| G | 8 | (Australia) | Wilson, Alex | 1.80 m (5 ft 11 in) |
| F | 10 | (Australia) | Greaves, Shanae | 1.85 m (6 ft 1 in) |
| C | 11 | (Australia) | Scherf, Lauren | 1.96 m (6 ft 5 in) |
| F | 14 | (Australia) | McSpadden, Lara | 1.94 m (6 ft 4 in) |
| G | 21 | (Australia) | Graham, Sarah (C) | 1.63 m (5 ft 4 in) |
| G | 22 | (Australia) | O'Hehir, Madeleine | 1.79 m (5 ft 10 in) |
| F | 30 | (United States) | Kuster, Jessica | 1.88 m (6 ft 2 in) |
| F | 42 | (United States) | Planeta, Colleen | 1.88 m (6 ft 2 in) |

Head coach

- (Australia) Katrina Hibbert

Assistant coach(es)

- (Australia) Tom Garlepp
- (Australia) Hannah Lowe

Legend

- (C) Team captain
- (DP) Development player
- (I) Import player
- Injured

- Roster
Updated: 11 October 2019

== Standings ==
| # | WNBL Championship ladder | | | | |
| # | Team | W | L | PCT | GP |
|---|---|---|---|---|---|
| 1 | Southside Flyers | 17 | 4 | 80.9 | 21 |
| 2 | Canberra Capitals | 15 | 6 | 71.4 | 21 |
| 3 | Melbourne Boomers | 15 | 6 | 71.4 | 21 |
| 4 | Adelaide Lightning | 12 | 9 | 57.1 | 21 |
| 5 | Perth Lynx | 8 | 13 | 38.0 | 21 |
| 6 | Sydney Uni Flames | 7 | 14 | 33.3 | 21 |
| 7 | Bendigo Spirit | 5 | 16 | 23.8 | 21 |
| 8 | Townsville Fire | 5 | 16 | 23.8 | 21 |

== Results ==
=== Pre-season ===
| Game | Date | Team | Score | High points | High rebounds | High assists | Location | Record |
|---|---|---|---|---|---|---|---|---|
| 1 | September; 17 | Aisin AW Wings | 78–70 | – | – | – | Brydens Stadium | 1–0 |
| 2 | September; 20 | China | 74–67 | – | – | – | Brydens Stadium | 2–0 |
| 3 | September; 28 | @ Townsville | 77–58 | – | – | – | Townsville Stadium | 3–0 |
| 4 | September; 29 | @ Townsville | 93–87 | – | – | – | Townsville Stadium | 4–0 |

=== Regular season ===
| Game | Date | Team | Score | High points | High rebounds | High assists | Location | Record |
|---|---|---|---|---|---|---|---|---|
| 1 | October; 11 | @ Adelaide | 79–89 | Planeta (30) | Scherf (17) | Kunek (6) | Titanium Security Arena | 0–1 |
| 2 | October; 13 | @ Perth | 62–79 | Kunek (15) | Planeta (9) | Kunek, Scherf (3) | Bendat Basketball Centre | 0–2 |
| 3 | October; 19 | Southside | 72–85 | Kunek (17) | Kuster (10) | Kunek, Tupaea (4) | Brydens Stadium | 0–3 |
| 4 | October; 27 | Canberra | 81–75 | Kunek (24) | Scherf (10) | Tupaea (4) | Brydens Stadium | 1–3 |
| 5 | November; 2 | @ Canberra | 66–91 | Kunek (17) | Scherf (9) | Scherf, Wilson (4) | AIS Arena | 1–4 |
| 6 | November; 7 | Townsville | 82–73 | Kunek (22) | Tupaea (8) | Kunek (4) | Brydens Stadium | 2–4 |
| 7 | November; 9 | @ Perth | 74–93 | Planeta (23) | Planeta (8) | Kunek (5) | Bendat Basketball Centre | 2–5 |
| 8 | November; 22 | Perth | 82–91 | Planeta, Wilson (16) | Kuster, Planeta (9) | Wilson (9) | Brydens Stadium | 2–6 |
| 9 | November; 29 | @ Bendigo | 80–75 | Kuster (23) | Scherf (13) | Wilson (8) | Bendigo Stadium | 3–6 |
| 10 | November; 30 | @ Melbourne | 81–94 | Kunek (24) | Planeta, Scherf (6) | Wilson (8) | State Basketball Centre | 3–7 |
| 11 | December; 8 | Adelaide | 81–69 | Planeta (28) | Planeta (12) | Kunek, Kuster (4) | Brydens Stadium | 4–7 |
| 12 | December; 15 | @ Townsville | 57–61 | Wilson (20) | Kuster (8) | Wilson (5) | Townsville Stadium | 4–8 |
| 13 | December; 19 | @ Bendigo | 88–81 | Kunek, Kuster (20) | Scherf (12) | Wilson (5) | Bendigo Stadium | 5–8 |
| 14 | December; 21 | @ Southside | 86–79 | Kunek (27) | Kunek (11) | Wilson (9) | Dandenong Stadium | 6–8 |
| 15 | December; 29 | Adelaide | 72–80 | Kunek (26) | Scherf (7) | Kunek, Kuster, Scherf, Wilson (4) | Brydens Stadium | 6–9 |
| 16 | January; 5 | Melbourne | 63–86 | Scherf (20) | Scherf (9) | Wilson (6) | Brydens Stadium | 6–10 |
| 17 | January; 12 | Townsville | 76–83 | Kunek (30) | Scherf (10) | Wilson (7) | Brydens Stadium | 6–11 |
| 18 | January; 18 | Melbourne | 62–76 | Smart (18) | Scherf (11) | Wilson (6) | Brydens Stadium | 6–12 |
| 19 | January; 26 | Canberra | 66–82 | Smart (21) | Scherf (8) | Kuster (8) | National Convention Centre | 6–13 |
| 20 | January; 30 | Bendigo | 78–68 | Smart (22) | Kuster, Wilson (9) | Wilson (8) | Brydens Stadium | 7–13 |
| 21 | February; 1 | @ Southside | 61–78 | Kuster (21) | Kuster (6) | Scherf (3) | Dandenong Stadium | 7–14 |

== Awards ==
=== In-season ===
| Award | Recipient | Round(s) | Ref. |
|---|---|---|---|
| Player of the Week | Colleen Planeta | Round 8 | |
| Player of the Week | Alice Kunek | Round 10 | |
| Team of the Week | Alice Kunek | Rounds 3 & 10 | |
| Team of the Week | Jessica Kuster | Rounds 7 & 10 | |
| Team of the Week | Colleen Planeta | Round 8 | |

=== Post-season ===
| Award | Recipient | Date | Ref. |
|---|---|---|---|
| All-WNBL Second Team | Alice Kunek | 17 February 2020 | |

=== Club Awards ===
| Award | Recipient | Date | Ref. |
|---|---|---|---|
| Most Valuable Player | Alice Kunek | 7 February 2020 | |
| Most Improved Player | Madeleine O'Hehir; Lauren Scherf | 7 February 2020 | |
| Players Player | Sarah Graham | 7 February 2020 | |
| Coaches Award | Colleen Planeta | 7 February 2020 | |
