= 2019–20 Southside Flyers season =

- Head Coach: Cheryl Chambers
- Captain: Jenna O'Hea
- Venue: Dandenong Stadium

Results
- Record: 17–4
- Ladder: 1st
- Finals: Grand Final (defeated by Canberra, 0–2)

Leaders
- Points: Cole (17.3)
- Rebounds: Russell (9.8)
- Assists: Mitchell (5.2)

The 2019–20 Southside Flyers season is the 28th season for the franchise in the Women's National Basketball League (WNBL). 2019–20 will be their first season as the Southside Flyers, concluding 27 seasons as the Dandenong Rangers.

== Roster ==
2019–20 Southside Flyers roster
Players
Coaches

Pos.	No.	Nat.	Name	Ht.
G	1	(Australia)	Cole, Rebecca	1.78 m (5 ft 10 in)
C	2	(Australia)	Tomlinson, Louella	1.93 m (6 ft 4 in)
G	3	(Australia)	Clydesdale, Aimie	1.78 m (5 ft 10 in)
G/F	4	(Australia)	O'Hea, Jenna (injured) (C)	1.87 m (6 ft 2 in)
G	5	(Australia)	Mitchell, Leilani	1.65 m (5 ft 5 in)
F	8	(Australia)	Pizzey, Rebecca	1.90 m (6 ft 3 in)
F	10	(Australia)	Rowe, Kiera	1.80 m (5 ft 11 in)
G	12	(Australia)	Reid, Stephanie	1.68 m (5 ft 6 in)
F	15	(Australia)	Blicavs, Sara	1.89 m (6 ft 2 in)
C	21	(United States)	Russell, Mercedes	1.98 m (6 ft 6 in)
G/F	24	(Australia)	Maley, Anneli	1.88 m (6 ft 2 in)

Head coach

- (Australia) Cheryl Chambers

Assistant coach(es)

- (Australia) Belinda Snell

Legend

- (C) Team captain
- (DP) Development player
- (I) Import player
- Injured

- Roster
Updated: 16 January 2019

== Standings ==
#	WNBL Championship ladder				
#	Team	W	L	PCT	GP
1	Southside Flyers	17	4	80.9	21
2	Canberra Capitals	15	6	71.4	21
3	Melbourne Boomers	15	6	71.4	21
4	Adelaide Lightning	12	9	57.1	21
5	Perth Lynx	8	13	38.0	21
6	Sydney Uni Flames	7	14	33.3	21
7	Bendigo Spirit	5	16	23.8	21
8	Townsville Fire	5	16	23.8	21

== Results ==
=== Pre-season ===
Game	Date	Team	Score	High points	High rebounds	High assists	Location	Record
1	August; 31	NBL1 All-Stars	89–50	Rowe (19)	Maley (19)	Cole, Reid (3)	Frankston Stadium	1–0
2	October; 3	Bendigo	56–73	Clydesdale (13)	Maley (14)	Cole (5)	Dandenong Stadium	1–1
3	October; 5	@ Melbourne	70–66	Clydesdale, Cole (19)	Russell (12)	Clydesdale, Cole (3)	State Basketball Centre	2–1

=== Regular season ===
Game	Date	Team	Score	High points	High rebounds	High assists	Location	Record
1	October; 12	Townsville	81–72	Mitchell (21)	O'Hea (8)	Cole (6)	Dandenong Stadium	1–0
2	October; 17	Perth	97–93 (OT)	O'Hea (19)	Russell (15)	Mitchell (10)	Dandenong Stadium	2–0
3	October; 19	@ Sydney	85–72	O'Hea (22)	Russell (11)	Mitchell (10)	Brydens Stadium	3–0
4	October; 26	Bendigo	85–77	Blicavs (23)	Russell (11)	Mitchell (7)	Traralgon Sports Stadium	4–0
5	November; 3	Bendigo	93–80	Cole (23)	Russell (15)	Mitchell (6)	Dandenong Stadium	5–0
6	November; 4	@ Melbourne	81–74	Russell (19)	Russell (11)	Cole (6)	State Basketball Centre	6–0
7	November; 7	Canberra	72–91	Mitchell (23)	Blicavs (6)	Mitchell, O'Hea (3)	Dandenong Stadium	6–1
8	November; 23	@ Townsville	91–59	O'Hea (21)	Blicavs (13)	Mitchell (8)	Townsville Stadium	7–1
9	November; 30	@ Perth	82–68	Cole (21)	Blicavs (8)	Mitchell (7)	Bendat Basketball Centre	8–1
10	December; 1	@ Adelaide	91–85	Russell (24)	Russell (14)	Cole (8)	Titanium Security Arena	9–1
11	December; 7	Melbourne	89–82	O'Hea (22)	Blicavs (10)	O'Hea (6)	Dandenong Stadium	10–1
12	December; 13	Townsville	81–62	O'Hea (17)	Blicavs, Russell (8)	Mitchell (6)	Dandenong Stadium	11–1
13	December; 15	@ Canberra	70–65	Cole (21)	Russell (10)	Clydesdale, O'Hea (3)	National Convention Centre	12–1
14	December; 21	Sydney	79–86	Blicavs (23)	Blicavs (9)	Mitchell (8)	Dandenong Stadium	12–2
15	January; 3	@ Perth	90–75	Cole (30)	Russell (11)	Cole (4)	Bendat Basketball Centre	13–2
16	January; 5	@ Adelaide	93–104	Russell (28)	Russell (10)	Mitchell (8)	Titanium Security Arena	13–3
17	January; 12	@ Melbourne	75–73 (OT)	Mitchell (21)	Russell (11)	Cole (6)	State Basketball Centre	14–3
18	January; 18	@ Bendigo	91–76	Cole (22)	Russell (12)	Mitchell (6)	Bendigo Stadium	15–3
19	January; 19	Canberra	74–98	Russell (18)	Russell (10)	Mitchell (5)	Dandenong Stadium	15–4
20	January; 25	Adelaide	81–69	Cole (28)	Blicavs (9)	Cole (5)	Dandenong Stadium	16–4
21	February; 1	Sydney	78–61	Blicavs (18)	Blicavs (8)	Blicavs (6)	Dandenong Stadium	17–4

=== Finals ===
==== Semi-finals ====
Game	Date	Team	Score	High points	High rebounds	High assists	Location	Series
1	February; 18	Adelaide	68–65	Russell (20)	Russell (19)	Cole, Mitchell (4)	Dandenong Stadium	1–0
2	February; 22	@ Adelaide	82–79	Cole (19)	Cole (10)	Mitchell (9)	Titanium Security Arena	2–0

==== Grand Final ====
Game	Date	Team	Score	High points	High rebounds	High assists	Location	Series
1	March; 1	Canberra	80–82	Cole (23)	Russell (9)	Cole (7)	Dandenong Stadium	0–1
2	March; 4	@ Canberra	68–71	Cole (23)	Russell (13)	Cole, O'Hea (3)	AIS Arena	0–2

== Awards ==
=== In-season ===
Award	Recipient	Round(s)	Ref.
Player of the Week	Jenna O'Hea	Round 2	
Player of the Week	Mercedes Russell	Round 7	
Player of the Week	Rebecca Cole	Round 15	
Player of the Week	Sara Blicavs	Round 16	
Team of the Week	Leilani Mitchell	Rounds 1, 7 & 13	
Team of the Week	Jenna O'Hea	Rounds 2, 6 & 8	
Team of the Week	Sara Blicavs	Rounds 3 & 16	
Team of the Week	Rebecca Cole	Rounds 4, 12 & 15	
Team of the Week	Mercedes Russell	Rounds 4, 7, 9 & 12	

=== Post-season ===
Award	Recipient	Date	Ref.
Defensive Player of the Year	Mercedes Russell	17 February 2020	
All-WNBL First Team	Leilani Mitchell	17 February 2020	
All-WNBL First Team	Jenna O'Hea	17 February 2020	
All-WNBL Second Team	Rebecca Cole	17 February 2020	
All-WNBL Second Team	Mercedes Russell	17 February 2020	

=== Club Awards ===
Award	Recipient	Date	Ref.
Most Valuable Player	Leilani Mitchell	11 March 2020	
X-Factor Award	Mercedes Russell	11 March 2020	
Val Ryan Players Player Award	Aimie Clydesdale	11 March 2020	
