= 2019–20 Perth Lynx season =

- Head Coach: Andy Stewart
- Captain: Katie Ebzery; Lauren Mansfield (co)
- Venue: Bendat Basketball Centre

Results
- Record: 8–13
- Ladder: 5th
- Finals: Did not qualify

Leaders
- Points: Ebzery (16.3)
- Rebounds: Schwagmeyer-Belger (5.6)
- Assists: Mansfield (4.5)

The 2019–20 Perth Lynx season is the 34th season for the franchise in the Women's National Basketball League (WNBL).

In September 2019, it was announced that local internet providers, Pentanet, would serve as principal partners for the Perth Lynx after signing a one-year deal. Andy Stewart remains as head coach, serving his fifth season in the role.

== Roster ==
2019–20 Perth Lynx roster
Players
Coaches

Pos.	No.	Nat.	Name	Ht.
F	3	(Australia)	Williams, Nes'eya	1.86 m (6 ft 1 in)
G	5	(Australia)	Mansfield, Lauren (C)	1.70 m (5 ft 7 in)
G	7	(United States)	Atkins, Ariel (I)	1.80 m (5 ft 11 in)
G	8	(Australia)	Strelein, Emma (DP)	1.78 m (5 ft 10 in)
G	10	(Australia)	Ebzery, Katie (C)	1.78 m (5 ft 10 in)
F	11	(Australia)	Allen, Maddison	1.90 m (6 ft 3 in)
F	12	(Australia)	Payne, Nadeen	1.88 m (6 ft 2 in)
G	15	(Australia)	Burrows, Tayah	1.79 m (5 ft 10 in)
G/F	21	(Australia)	Whittle, Marena	1.80 m (5 ft 11 in)
G/F	32	(United States)	Schwagmeyer, Alison	1.77 m (5 ft 10 in)

Head coach

- (Australia) Andy Stewart

Assistant coach(es)

- (Australia) Ryan Petrik

Legend

- (C) Team captain
- (DP) Development player
- (I) Import player
- Injured

- Roster
Updated: 16 January 2019

== Standings ==
#	WNBL Championship ladder				
#	Team	W	L	PCT	GP
1	Southside Flyers	17	4	80.9	21
2	Canberra Capitals	15	6	71.4	21
3	Melbourne Boomers	15	6	71.4	21
4	Adelaide Lightning	12	9	57.1	21
5	Perth Lynx	8	13	38.0	21
6	Sydney Uni Flames	7	14	33.3	21
7	Bendigo Spirit	5	16	23.8	21
8	Townsville Fire	5	16	23.8	21

== Results ==
=== Pre-season ===
Game	Date	Team	Score	High points	High rebounds	High assists	Location	Record
1	September; 20	Adelaide	54–64	Schwagmeyer-Belger (13)	Allen (11)	Whittle (3)	Mandurah Aquatic & Recreation Centre	0–1
2	September; 21	Adelaide	80–77	Schwagmeyer-Belger (21)	Whittle (9)	Mansfield (9)	Bendat Basketball Centre	1–1

=== Regular season ===
Game	Date	Team	Score	High points	High rebounds	High assists	Location	Record
1	October; 13	Sydney	79–62	Schwagmeyer-Belger (21)	Schwagmeyer-Belger (10)	Ebzery (7)	Bendat Basketball Centre	1–0
2	October; 17	@ Southside	93–97 (OT)	Schwagmeyer-Belger (34)	Schwagmeyer-Belger (12)	Mansfield (9)	Dandenong Stadium	1–1
3	October; 20	@ Bendigo	79–91	McGee-Stafford, Payne, Whittle (15)	McGee-Stafford, Schwagmeyer-Belger (9)	Ebzery, Schwagmeyer-Belger (5)	Bendigo Stadium	1–2
4	October; 26	Adelaide	86–90 (OT)	Ebzery, Payne (22)	Allen (8)	Ebzery (15)	Bendat Basketball Centre	1–3
5	November; 2	Townsville	88–93 (OT)	Schwagmeyer-Belger (23)	Atkins (7)	Ebzery (9)	Bendat Basketball Centre	1–4
6	November; 9	Sydney	93–74	Ebzery (28)	Allen, Schwagmeyer-Belger (9)	Mansfield (7)	Bendat Basketball Centre	2–4
7	November; 22	@ Sydney	91–82	Schwagmeyer-Belger (25)	Schwagmeyer-Belger (10)	Atkins (4)	Brydens Stadium	3–4
8	November; 24	@ Canberra	66–84	Mansfield (23)	Payne (10)	Mansfield (4)	National Convention Centre	3–5
9	November; 29	Southside	68–82	Schwagmeyer-Belger (16)	Allen, Ebzery (8)	Mansfield (4)	Bendat Basketball Centre	3–6
10	December; 6	@ Adelaide	69–79	Ebzery (18)	McGee-Stafford (11)	Mansfield (5)	Titanium Security Arena	3–7
11	December; 8	@ Melbourne	63–72	Schwagmeyer-Belger (13)	McGee-Stafford (11)	Whittle (5)	State Basketball Centre	3–8
12	December; 15	Melbourne	68–66	Ebzery (16)	McGee-Stafford (9)	Mansfield, Schwagmeyer-Belger (4)	Bendat Basketball Centre	4–8
13	December; 21	@ Townsville	82–77	Atkins (16)	Ebzery, Payne (6)	Mansfield (6)	Townsville Stadium	5–8
14	December; 29	Canberra	59–76	Ebzery (25)	Whittle (13)	Schwagmeyer-Belger (4)	Bendat Basketball Centre	5–9
15	January; 3	@ Southside	75–90	Ebzery (20)	McGee-Stafford (9)	Ebzery, Mansfield (6)	Dandenong Stadium	5–10
16	January; 12	Bendigo	100–81	Payne, Whittle (19)	Allen (7)	Ebzery, Mansfield (6)	Bendat Basketball Centre	6–10
17	January; 19	Townsville	95–62	Schwagmeyer-Belger (21)	Ebzery (8)	Atkins, Mansfield (3)	Bendat Basketball Centre	7–10
18	January; 22	@ Canberra	75–89	Whittle (18)	Allen (10)	Ebzery, Mansfield (4)	National Convention Centre	7–11
19	January; 24	@ Bendigo	89–66	Ebzery (28)	Atkins (10)	Mansfield (9)	Bendigo Stadium	8–11
20	January; 30	@ Adelaide	74–75	Atkins, Ebzery (16)	Allen (15)	Atkins, Mansfield (3)	Titanium Security Arena	8–12
21	February; 1	@ Melbourne	75–104	Atkins (24)	Atkins, Whittle (8)	Mansfield (3)	State Basketball Centre	8–13

== Awards ==
=== In-season ===
Award	Recipient	Round(s)	Ref.
Team of the Week	Alison Schwagmeyer	Rounds 1, 2 & 6	
Team of the Week	Katie Ebzery	Rounds 3, 5, 10, 14 & 15	
Team of the Week	Lauren Mansfield	Round 9	
Team of the Week	Marena Whittle	Round 13	

=== Post-season ===
Award	Recipient	Date	Ref.
All-WNBL First Team	Katie Ebzery	17 February 2020	
Sixth Woman of the Year	Alison Schwagmeyer	17 February 2020	

=== Club Awards ===
Award	Recipient	Date	Ref.
Most Valuable Player	Katie Ebzery	2 March 2020	
Best Defensive Player	Maddison Allen	2 March 2020	
Most Improved Player	Marena Whittle	2 March 2020	
Coaches Award	Alison Schwagmeyer	2 March 2020	
