= 2019–20 Melbourne Boomers season =

- Head Coach: Guy Molloy
- Captain: Madeleine Garrick; Cayla George (co)
- Venue: State Basketball Centre

Results
- Record: 15–6
- Ladder: 3rd
- Finals: Semi-Finals (defeated by Canberra, 1–2)

Leaders
- Points: Allen (14.8)
- Rebounds: George (8.5)
- Assists: Allen (4.8)

The 2019–20 Melbourne Boomers season is the 37th season for the franchise in the Women's National Basketball League (WNBL).

Deakin University are again the Boomers' naming rights partner, after signing a two-year extension in November 2017.

== Roster ==
2019–20 Melbourne Boomers roster
Players
Coaches

Pos.	No.	Nat.	Name	Ht.
G	3	(United States)	Cunningham, Sophie	1.85 m (6 ft 1 in)
G	7	(New Zealand)	Farnworth, Antonia	1.81 m (5 ft 11 in)
F	11	(New Zealand)	Davidson, Penina	1.90 m (6 ft 3 in)
G	12	(Australia)	D'Angelo, Chelsea	1.77 m (5 ft 10 in)
F	13	(Australia)	Magbegor, Ezi	1.93 m (6 ft 4 in)
G	14	(Australia)	Conti, Monique	1.65 m (5 ft 5 in)
G	15	(United States)	Allen, Lindsay	1.73 m (5 ft 8 in)
G	21	(New Zealand)	Beck, Stella	1.83 m (6 ft 0 in)
F/C	22	(Australia)	George, Cayla (C)	1.92 m (6 ft 4 in)
G	23	(Australia)	Garrick, Madeleine (C)	1.78 m (5 ft 10 in)
F	32	(New Zealand)	Purcell, Kalani	1.87 m (6 ft 2 in)

Head coach

- (Australia) Guy Molloy

Assistant coach(es)

- (Australia) Larissa Anderson
- (Australia) Paul Flynn
- (New Zealand) Kennedy Kereama

Legend

- (C) Team captain
- (DP) Development player
- (I) Import player
- Injured

- Roster
Updated: 18 August 2019

== Standings ==
#	WNBL Championship ladder				
#	Team	W	L	PCT	GP
1	Southside Flyers	17	4	80.9	21
2	Canberra Capitals	15	6	71.4	21
3	Melbourne Boomers	15	6	71.4	21
4	Adelaide Lightning	12	9	57.1	21
5	Perth Lynx	8	13	38.0	21
6	Sydney Uni Flames	7	14	33.3	21
7	Bendigo Spirit	5	16	23.8	21
8	Townsville Fire	5	16	23.8	21

== Results ==
=== Pre-season ===
Game	Date	Team	Score	High points	High rebounds	High assists	Location	Record
1	September; 7	NBL1 All-Stars	81–70	Magbegor (15)	Purcell (11)	Conti (5)	Mullum Mullum Stadium	1–0
2	September; 10	China	79–70	Garrick (26)	Magbegor (9)	Beck (7)	Casey Stadium	2–0
3	September; 15	Bendigo	62–64	Garrick (26)	Beck (8)	Beck, George, Purcell (2)	Traralgon Sports Stadium	2–1
4	October; 5	Southside	66–70	Magbegor (15)	Garrick (8)	Conti (4)	State Basketball Centre	2–2

=== Regular season ===
Game	Date	Team	Score	High points	High rebounds	High assists	Location	Record
1	October; 12	@ Bendigo	87–72	Allen (19)	George (9)	Allen (7)	Bendigo Stadium	1–0
2	October; 19	Bendigo	74–70	George (24)	George (12)	Allen (6)	State Basketball Centre	2–0
3	October; 25	Canberra	107–72	Allen (23)	George (12)	Allen, George (6)	Geelong Arena	3–0
4	October; 27	@ Townsville	80–71	Allen (25)	George (7)	Allen (5)	Townsville Stadium	4–0
5	November; 4	Southside	74–81	George (22)	George (13)	Allen (6)	State Basketball Centre	4–1
6	November; 9	Canberra	76–79	Allen, Cunningham (18)	George (8)	Allen (6)	State Basketball Centre	4–2
7	November; 22	@ Adelaide	71–57	Allen (20)	Magbegor (11)	Allen (5)	Titanium Security Arena	5–2
8	November; 24	@ Bendigo	75–59	Allen (17)	Cunningham, Magbegor (7)	George (6)	Bendigo Stadium	6–2
9	November; 30	Sydney	94–81	Garrick (26)	George (14)	George (8)	State Basketball Centre	7–2
10	December; 7	@ Southside	82–89	George (19)	George (8)	Allen (8)	Dandenong Stadium	7–3
11	December; 8	Perth	72–63	Garrick (17)	Purcell (7)	George (4)	State Basketball Centre	8–3
12	December; 15	@ Perth	66–68	Cunningham (16)	George (10)	Conti (5)	Bendat Basketball Centre	8–4
13	December; 22	Adelaide	66–57	Allen (22)	Magbegor (10)	Allen, Cunningham; Magbegor (3)	State Basketball Centre	9–4
14	December; 27	Townsville	77–61	George (27)	Magbegor, Purcell (9)	Purcell (6)	State Basketball Centre	10–4
15	January; 5	@ Sydney	86–63	Garrick (19)	George, Magbegor (10)	Allen (6)	Brydens Stadium	11–4
16	January; 10	@ Adelaide	74–69	Cunningham (18)	Garrick (9)	George (7)	Titanium Security Arena	12–4
17	January; 12	Southside	73–75 (OT)	Magbegor (24)	Magbegor (12)	Conti, George (5)	State Basketball Centre	12–5
18	January; 17	@ Canberra	75–76 (OT)	Cunningham (22)	George (8)	Beck, Purcell (3)	National Convention Centre	12–6
19	January; 18	@ Sydney	76–62	Magbegor (25)	George (8)	Garrick (7)	Brydens Stadium	13–6
20	January; 25	@ Townsville	79–68	Magbegor (21)	Garrick (7)	Farnworth (5)	Townsville Stadium	14–6
21	February; 1	Perth	104–75	George (24)	George, Magbegor (12)	George (9)	State Basketball Centre	15–6

=== Finals ===
==== Semi-finals ====
Game	Date	Team	Score	High points	High rebounds	High assists	Location	Series
1	February; 16	@ Canberra	70–84	Allen (17)	George (8)	Allen (5)	AIS Arena	0–1
2	February; 23	Canberra	88–76	Allen (25)	Magbegor (9)	George (5)	State Basketball Centre	1–1
3	February; 26	@ Canberra	64–77	Cunningham (14)	George (12)	George (4)	AIS Arena	1–2

== Awards ==
=== In-season ===
Award	Recipient	Round(s)	Ref.
Player of the Week	Lindsay Allen	Round 6	
Team of the Week	Lindsay Allen	Rounds 1, 3, 6 & 10	
Team of the Week	Cayla George	Rounds 2, 6, 11 & 16	
Team of the Week	Madeleine Garrick	Round 7	
Team of the Week	Ezi Magbegor	Rounds 13, 14 & 15	

=== Post-season ===
Award	Recipient	Date	Ref.
All-WNBL Second Team	Cayla George	17 February 2020	
Youth Player of the Year	Ezi Magbegor	17 February 2020	

=== Club Awards ===
Award	Recipient	Date	Ref.
Michele Timms Medal (Most Valuable Player)	Cayla George	12 March 2020	
Most Improved Player	Ezi Magbegor	12 March 2020	
Players Player	Sophie Cunningham	12 March 2020	
Members Player	Cayla George	12 March 2020	
Coaches Award	Stella Beck	12 March 2020	
Deakin High Performance Player of the Season	Stella Beck	12 March 2020	
