= 2019–20 Adelaide Lightning season =

- Head Coach: Chris Lucas
- Captain: Nicole Seekamp
- Venue: Titanium Security Arena

Results
- Record: 12–9
- Ladder: 4th
- Finals: Semi-Finals (defeated by Southside, 0–2)

Leaders
- Points: Turner (16.1)
- Rebounds: Turner (10.8)
- Assists: Seekamp (8.0)

The 2019–20 Adelaide Lightning season is the 28th season for the franchise in the Women's National Basketball League (WNBL).

== Roster ==
2019–20 Adelaide Lightning roster
Players
Coaches

Pos.	No.	Nat.	Name	Ht.
G	1	(Australia)	Nicholson, Lauren	1.80 m (5 ft 11 in)
G	3	(Australia)	Kaser, Hannah	1.78 m (5 ft 10 in)
G	6	(Australia)	Elsworthy, Sarah	1.71 m (5 ft 7 in)
G/F	7	(Australia)	Talbot, Stephanie	1.88 m (6 ft 2 in)
F/C	8	(Australia)	Brook, Chelsea	1.88 m (6 ft 2 in)
F	10	(Australia)	Hodges, Laura	1.88 m (6 ft 2 in)
F	11	(United States)	Turner, Brianna	1.91 m (6 ft 3 in)
G	16	(Australia)	Hurst, Natalie	1.63 m (5 ft 4 in)
F	21	(Australia)	Porter, Ruby	1.78 m (5 ft 10 in)
F	33	(United States)	Westbeld, Kathryn	1.88 m (6 ft 2 in)
G	35	(Australia)	Seekamp, Nicole (C)	1.78 m (5 ft 10 in)

Head coach

- (Australia) Chris Lucas

Assistant coach(es)

- (Australia) Zach O'Brien
- (Australia) Marcus Wong

Legend

- (C) Team captain
- (DP) Development player
- (I) Import player
- Injured

- Roster
Updated: 21 November 2019

== Standings ==
#	WNBL Championship ladder				
#	Team	W	L	PCT	GP
1	Southside Flyers	17	4	80.9	21
2	Canberra Capitals	15	6	71.4	21
3	Melbourne Boomers	15	6	71.4	21
4	Adelaide Lightning	12	9	57.1	21
5	Perth Lynx	8	13	38.0	21
6	Sydney Uni Flames	7	14	33.3	21
7	Bendigo Spirit	5	16	23.8	21
8	Townsville Fire	5	16	23.8	21

== Results ==
=== Pre-season ===
Game	Date	Team	Score	High points	High rebounds	High assists	Location	Record
1	September; 20	@ Perth	64–54	Edwards (19)	Brook (10)	Elsworthy, Porter (3)	Mandurah Aquatic & Recreation Centre	1–0
2	September; 21	@ Perth	77–80	Porter (17)	Edwards (12)	Rintala (5)	Bendat Basketball Centre	1–1

=== Regular season ===
Game	Date	Team	Score	High points	High rebounds	High assists	Location	Record
1	October; 11	Sydney	89–79	Langhorne (20)	Langhorne (13)	Seekamp (8)	Titanium Security Arena	1–0
2	October; 13	@ Canberra	83–90	Nicholson (32)	Seekamp, Talbot (7)	Seekamp (8)	AIS Arena	1–1
3	October; 18	@ Townsville	86–68	Turner (19)	Turner (9)	Seekamp (7)	Townsville Stadium	2–1
4	October; 26	@ Perth	90–86 (OT)	Turner (26)	Turner (17)	Seekamp (12)	Bendat Basketball Centre	3–1
5	November; 1	@ Bendigo	54–67	Turner (21)	Turner (12)	Seekamp (7)	Bendigo Stadium	3–2
6	November; 9	Bendigo	105–77	Turner (22)	Turner (8)	Seekamp (9)	Titanium Security Arena	4–2
7	November; 22	Melbourne	57–71	Seekamp (15)	Turner (14)	Nicholson (5)	Titanium Security Arena	4–3
8	December; 1	Southside	85–91	Talbot (25)	Talbot, Turner (8)	Seekamp (6)	Titanium Security Arena	4–4
9	December; 6	Perth	79–69	Turner (24)	Turner (13)	Seekamp (8)	Titanium Security Arena	5–4
10	December; 8	@ Sydney	69–81	Turner (19)	Seekamp, Talbot, Turner (7)	Seekamp (7)	Brydens Stadium	5–5
11	December; 15	Bendigo	91–75	Turner (23)	Turner (13)	Talbot (9)	Titanium Security Arena	6–5
12	December; 22	@ Melbourne	57–66	Turner (19)	Turner (11)	Seekamp (5)	State Basketball Centre	6–6
13	December; 27	Canberra	78–68 (OT)	Talbot (21)	Talbot (16)	Seekamp (9)	Titanium Security Arena	7–6
14	December; 29	@ Sydney	80–72	Westbeld (17)	Talbot (9)	Talbot (9)	Brydens Stadium	8–6
15	January; 3	@ Townsville	87–61	Turner (17)	Seekamp, Talbot, Turner (7)	Seekamp (8)	Townsville Stadium	9–6
16	January; 5	Southside	104–93	Turner (25)	Turner (9)	Seekamp (20)	Titanium Security Arena	10–6
17	January; 10	Melbourne	69–74	Turner (23)	Turner (11)	Seekamp (11)	Titanium Security Arena	10–7
18	January; 17	Townsville	77–60	Talbot (16)	Talbot (10)	Seekamp (9)	Titanium Security Arena	11–7
19	January; 25	@ Southside	69–81	Turner (20)	Talbot (10)	Talbot (6)	Dandenong Stadium	11–8
20	January; 30	Perth	75–74	Seekamp (17)	Turner (24)	Seekamp (8)	Titanium Security Arena	12–8
21	February; 1	@ Canberra	71–73	Nicholson (16)	Talbot, Turner (12)	Talbot (9)	National Convention Centre	12–9

=== Finals ===
==== Semi-finals ====
Game	Date	Team	Score	High points	High rebounds	High assists	Location	Series
1	February; 18	@ Southside	65–68	Nicholson (14)	Talbot, Turner (9)	Talbot (6)	Dandenong Stadium	0–1
2	February; 22	Southside	79–82	Turner (25)	Turner (18)	Seekamp (11)	Titanium Security Arena	0–2

== Awards ==
=== In-season ===
Award	Recipient	Round(s)	Ref.
Player of the Week	Brianna Turner	Rounds 3 & 9	
Player of the Week	Stephanie Talbot	Round 11	
Player of the Week	Nicole Seekamp	Round 12	
Team of the Week	Brianna Turner	Rounds 3, 8, 9, 12 & 16	
Team of the Week	Stephanie Talbot	Rounds 5, 9, 11 & 14	
Team of the Week	Nicole Seekamp	Rounds 5 & 12	

=== Post-season ===
Award	Recipient	Date	Ref.
All-WNBL First Team	Brianna Turner	17 February 2020	
All-WNBL Second Team	Stephanie Talbot	17 February 2020	

=== Club Awards ===
Award	Recipient	Date	Ref.
Most Valuable Player	Brianna Turner	2 March 2020	
Best Defensive Player	Lauren Nicholson	2 March 2020	
Players Player	Natalie Hurst	2 March 2020	
Coaches Award	Chelsea Brook	2 March 2020	
Rachael Sporn Award	Jasmin Fejo	2 March 2020	
