= 2019–20 WNBL season =

- League: Women's National Basketball League
- Sport: Basketball
- Teams: 8
- TV partner: Fox Sports

Regular season
- Top seed: Southside Flyers
- Season MVP: Kia Nurse (CBR)
- Top scorer: Kia Nurse (CBR)

Finals
- Champions: Canberra Capitals
- Runners-up: Southside Flyers
- Finals MVP: Olivia Époupa (CBR)

WNBL seasons
- ← 2018–19 2020 →

The 2019–20 WNBL season is the 40th season of the competition since its establishment in 1981. The Canberra Capitals were the defending champions and they successfully defended their title with a 2–0 win over Southside. The 2019–20 title was the ninth overall for the Capitals franchise.

Chemist Warehouse will again be the WNBL's naming rights partner for this season, after signing a three-year deal in July 2018. Spalding again provided equipment including the official game ball, alongside iAthletic supplying team apparel for the third year.

== Standings ==
#	WNBL Championship ladder				
#	Team	W	L	PCT	GP
1	Southside Flyers	17	4	80.9	21
2	Canberra Capitals	15	6	71.4	21
3	Melbourne Boomers	15	6	71.4	21
4	Adelaide Lightning	12	9	57.1	21
5	Perth Lynx	8	13	38.0	21
6	Sydney Uni Flames	7	14	33.3	21
7	Bendigo Spirit	5	16	23.8	21
8	Townsville Fire	5	16	23.8	21

== Finals ==
Semifinals
1	Southside Flyers	2
4	Adelaide Lightning	0
3	Melbourne Boomers	1
2	Canberra Capitals	2

Grand Final
1	Southside Flyers	0
2	Canberra Capitals	2

== Statistics ==
=== Individual statistic leaders ===
Category	Player	Statistic
Points per game	Kia Nurse (CBR)	21.3 PPG
Rebounds per game	Kelsey Griffin (CBR)	10.9 RPG
Assists per game	Nicole Seekamp (ADL)	8.0 APG
Steals per game	Olivia Époupa (CBR)	3.1 SPG
Blocks per game	Brianna Turner (ADL)	2.2 BPG

=== Individual game highs ===
Category	Player	Statistic
Points	Alison Schwagmeyer (PER)	34
Rebounds	Brianna Turner (ADL)	24
Assists	Nicole Seekamp (ADL)	20
Steals	Olivia Époupa (CBR)	7
Steals	Kelsey Griffin (CBR)	7
Blocks	Brianna Turner (ADL)	5

== Awards ==
=== Player of the Week ===
Round #	Player	Ref.
Round 1	Kelsey Griffin (CBR)	
Round 2	Jenna O'Hea (STH)	
Round 3	Brianna Turner (ADL)	
Round 4		
Round 5	Kia Nurse (CBR)	
Round 6	Lindsay Allen (MEL)	
Round 7	Mercedes Russell (STH)	
Round 8	Colleen Planeta (SYD)	
Round 9	Brianna Turner (ADL) (2)	
Round 10	Alice Kunek (SYD)	
Round 11	Stephanie Talbot (ADL)	
Round 12	Nicole Seekamp (ADL)	
Round 13	Bridget Carleton (TSV)	
Round 14	Kia Nurse (CBR) (2)	
Round 15	Rebecca Cole (STH)	
Round 16	Sara Blicavs (STH)	

=== Team of the Week ===
Round #	Team					Ref.
Round 1	Lindsay Allen (MEL)	Leilani Mitchell (STH)	Kia Nurse (CBR)	Alison Schwagmeyer (PER)	Kelsey Griffin (CBR)	
Round 2	Jenna O'Hea (STH)	Alison Schwagmeyer (PER) (2)	Carley Ernst (BEN)	Abby Bishop (TSV)	Cayla George (MEL)	
Round 3	Lindsay Allen (MEL) (2)	Katie Ebzery (PER)	Alice Kunek (SYD)	Sara Blicavs (STH)	Brianna Turner (ADL)	
Round 4	Olivia Époupa (CBR)	Micaela Cocks (TSV)	Rebecca Cole (STH)	Abby Bishop (TSV) (2)	Mercedes Russell (STH)	
Round 5	Katie Ebzery (PER) (2)	Nicole Seekamp (ADL)	Kia Nurse (CBR) (2)	Stephanie Talbot (ADL)	Kelsey Griffin (CBR) (2)	
Round 6	Lindsay Allen (MEL) (3)	Jenna O'Hea (STH) (2)	Alison Schwagmeyer (PER) (3)	Kelsey Griffin (CBR) (3)	Cayla George (MEL) (2)	
Round 7	Leilani Mitchell (STH) (2)	Madeleine Garrick (MEL)	Jessica Kuster (SYD)	Kelsey Griffin (CBR) (4)	Mercedes Russell (STH) (2)	
Round 8	Jenna O'Hea (STH) (3)	Kia Nurse (CBR) (3)	Colleen Planeta (SYD)	Darcee Garbin (TSV)	Brianna Turner (ADL) (2)	
Round 9	Lauren Mansfield (PER)	Stephanie Talbot (ADL) (2)	Darcee Garbin (TSV) (2)	Brianna Turner (ADL) (3)	Mercedes Russell (STH) (3)	
Round 10	Lindsay Allen (MEL) (4)	Katie Ebzery (PER) (3)	Alice Kunek (SYD) (2)	Jessica Kuster (SYD) (2)	Keely Froling (CBR)	
Round 11	Olivia Époupa (CBR) (2)	Abigail Wehrung (BEN)	Stephanie Talbot (ADL) (3)	Cayla George (MEL) (3)	Marianna Tolo (CBR)	
Round 12	Nicole Seekamp (ADL) (2)	Shyla Heal (BEN)	Rebecca Cole (STH) (2)	Brianna Turner (ADL) (4)	Mercedes Russell (STH) (4)	
Round 13	Leilani Mitchell (STH) (3)	Julie Vanloo (TSV)	Marena Whittle (PER)	Bridget Carleton (TSV)	Ezi Magbegor (MEL)	
Round 14	Katie Ebzery (PER) (4)	Olivia Époupa (CBR) (3)	Kia Nurse (CBR) (4)	Stephanie Talbot (ADL) (4)	Ezi Magbegor (MEL) (2)	
Round 15	Katie Ebzery (PER) (5)	Maddison Rocci (CBR)	Rebecca Cole (STH) (3)	Kia Nurse (CBR) (5)	Ezi Magbegor (MEL) (3)	
Round 16	Tessa Lavey (BEN)	Kia Nurse (CBR) (6)	Sara Blicavs (STH)	Brianna Turner (ADL) (5)	Cayla George (MEL) (4)	

=== Postseason Awards ===
Award	Winner	Position	Team
Most Valuable Player	Kia Nurse	Guard	Canberra Capitals
Grand Final MVP	Olivia Époupa	Guard	Canberra Capitals
Defensive Player of the Year	Mercedes Russell	Center	Southside Flyers
Sixth Woman of the Year	Alison Schwagmeyer	Guard	Perth Lynx
Youth Player of the Year	Ezi Magbegor	Forward	Melbourne Boomers
Top Shooter Award	Kia Nurse	Guard	Canberra Capitals
Coach of the Year	Paul Goriss	Coach	Canberra Capitals
All-WNBL First Team	Leilani Mitchell	Guard	Southside Flyers
All-WNBL First Team	Katie Ebzery	Guard	Perth Lynx
All-WNBL First Team	Kia Nurse	Guard	Canberra Capitals
All-WNBL First Team	Jenna O'Hea	Guard/Forward	Southside Flyers
All-WNBL First Team	Brianna Turner	Forward/Center	Adelaide Lightning
All-WNBL Second Team	Rebecca Cole	Guard	Southside Flyers
All-WNBL Second Team	Stephanie Talbot	Guard/Forward	Adelaide Lightning
All-WNBL Second Team	Alice Kunek	Guard/Forward	Sydney Uni Flames
All-WNBL Second Team	Cayla George	Forward/Center	Melbourne Boomers
All-WNBL Second Team	Mercedes Russell	Center	Southside Flyers

== Team captains and coaches ==
Team	Captain	Coach
Adelaide Lightning	Nicole Seekamp	Chris Lucas
Bendigo Spirit	Tessa Lavey / Kelly Wilson (co)	Tracy York
Canberra Capitals	Kelsey Griffin / Marianna Tolo (co)	Paul Goriss
Melbourne Boomers	Madeleine Garrick / Cayla George (co)	Guy Molloy
Perth Lynx	Katie Ebzery / Lauren Mansfield (co)	Andy Stewart
Southside Flyers	Jenna O'Hea	Cheryl Chambers
Sydney Uni Flames	Sarah Graham	Katrina Hibbert
Townsville Fire	Micaela Cocks	Shannon Seebohm
