= 2019–20 Townsville Fire season =

- Head Coach: Shannon Seebohm
- Captain: Micaela Cocks
- Venue: Townsville Stadium

Results
- Record: 5–16
- Ladder: 8th
- Finals: Did not qualify

Leaders
- Points: Bishop (15.9)
- Rebounds: Bishop (7.6)
- Assists: Vanloo (4.4)

The 2019–20 Townsville Fire season is the 19th season for the franchise in the Women's National Basketball League (WNBL).

James Cook University remain as the Fire's naming rights partner after signing a three-year extension in September 2019. 2019–20 will be the Fire's first season under new head coach, Shannon Seebohm, who overtook the role from Claudia Brassard after she spent three seasons in the position.

== Roster ==
2019–20 Townsville Fire roster
Players
Coaches

Pos.	No.	Nat.	Name	Ht.
F	4	(Australia)	Young, Hannah	1.85 m (6 ft 1 in)
F	9	(Australia)	Madgen, Tess	1.80 m (5 ft 11 in)
F/C	10	(Australia)	Bishop, Abby	1.89 m (6 ft 2 in)
G	11	(Australia)	Gaze, Kate	1.78 m (5 ft 10 in)
G	12	(Australia)	Ebzery, Alison	1.78 m (5 ft 10 in)
F	14	(Australia)	Garbin, Darcee	1.88 m (6 ft 2 in)
C	15	(Australia)	Aokuso, Zitina (injured)	1.94 m (6 ft 4 in)
G	21	(Canada)	Carleton, Bridget	1.85 m (6 ft 1 in)
F	22	(Australia)	Boag, Christina	1.88 m (6 ft 2 in)
G	32	(New Zealand)	Cocks, Micaela (C)	1.74 m (5 ft 9 in)
G	35	(Belgium)	Vanloo, Julie	1.68 m (5 ft 6 in)

Head coach

- (Australia) Shannon Seebohm

Assistant coach(es)

- (Australia) Luke Brennan

Legend

- (C) Team captain
- (DP) Development player
- (I) Import player
- Injured

- Roster
Updated: 11 October 2019

== Standings ==
#	WNBL Championship ladder				
#	Team	W	L	PCT	GP
1	Southside Flyers	17	4	80.9	21
2	Canberra Capitals	15	6	71.4	21
3	Melbourne Boomers	15	6	71.4	21
4	Adelaide Lightning	12	9	57.1	21
5	Perth Lynx	8	13	38.0	21
6	Sydney Uni Flames	7	14	33.3	21
7	Bendigo Spirit	5	16	23.8	21
8	Townsville Fire	5	16	23.8	21

== Results ==
=== Pre-season ===
Game	Date	Team	Score	High points	High rebounds	High assists	Location	Record
1	September; 28	Sydney	58–77	–	–	–	Townsville Stadium	0–1
2	September; 29	Sydney	87–93	–	–	–	Townsville Stadium	0–2

=== Regular season ===
Game	Date	Team	Score	High points	High rebounds	High assists	Location	Record
1	October; 12	@ Southside	72–81	Carleton (20)	Carleton, Madgen, Garbin (7)	Madgen, Vanloo (4)	Dandenong Stadium	0–1
2	October; 18	Adelaide	68–86	Bishop (24)	Garbin (10)	Madgen (4)	Townsville Stadium	0–2
3	October; 20	@ Canberra	65–67	Carleton (14)	Bishop (13)	Vanloo (5)	National Convention Centre	0–3
4	October; 27	Melbourne	71–80	Bishop (20)	Bishop, Garbin, Madgen (6)	Madgen (5)	Townsville Stadium	0–4
5	November; 2	@ Perth	93–88 (OT)	Bishop (31)	Bishop (11)	Cocks, Madgen (5)	Bendat Basketball Centre	1–4
6	November; 7	@ Sydney	73–82	Garbin (19)	Garbin (7)	Bishop (7)	Brydens Stadium	1–5
7	November; 23	Southside	59–91	Bishop (20)	Bishop (8)	Cocks, Garbin (3)	Townsville Stadium	1–6
8	November; 30	@ Canberra	78–87	Bishop (23)	Carleton (7)	Madgen (6)	National Convention Centre	1–7
9	December; 8	Bendigo	94–80	Garbin (27)	Carleton, Garbin (7)	Vanloo (9)	Townsville Stadium	2–7
10	December; 13	@ Southside	62–81	Garbin (28)	Bishop, Madgen (6)	Vanloo (8)	Dandenong Stadium	2–8
11	December; 15	Sydney	61–57	Garbin, Madgen (15)	Carleton (13)	Bishop, Cocks (4)	Townsville Stadium	3–8
12	December; 21	Perth	77–82	Bishop (18)	Bishop (16)	Vanloo (7)	Townsville Stadium	3–9
13	December; 27	@ Melbourne	61–77	Bishop (19)	Garbin (7)	Madgen (4)	State Basketball Centre	3–10
14	December; 28	@ Bendigo	78–79	Carleton (19)	Carleton (12)	Vanloo (9)	Bendigo Stadium	3–11
15	January; 3	Adelaide	61–87	Garbin (21)	Garbin (7)	Madgen (5)	Townsville Stadium	3–12
16	January; 10	Canberra	102–69	Madgen (26)	Carleton (11)	Vanloo (10)	Townsville Stadium	4–12
17	January; 12	@ Sydney	83–76	Garbin (18)	Garbin (9)	Vanloo (6)	Brydens Stadium	5–12
18	January; 17	@ Adelaide	60–77	Madgen (19)	Garbin (10)	Madgen (4)	Titanium Security Arena	5–13
19	January; 19	@ Perth	62–95	Garbin (19)	Carleton (12)	Carleton, Gaze, Vanloo (3)	Bendat Basketball Centre	5–14
20	January; 25	Melbourne	68–79	Carleton (16)	Boag, Garbin (7)	Vanloo (8)	Townsville Stadium	5–15
21	February; 1	Bendigo	69–89	Boag (22)	Boag (15)	Vanloo (7)	Townsville Stadium	5–16

== Awards ==
=== In-season ===
Award	Recipient	Round(s)	Ref.
Player of the Week	Bridget Carleton	Round 13	
Team of the Week	Abby Bishop	Rounds 2 & 4	
Team of the Week	Micaela Cocks	Round 4	
Team of the Week	Darcee Garbin	Rounds 8 & 9	
Team of the Week	Bridget Carleton	Round 13	
Team of the Week	Julie Vanloo	Round 13	

=== Club Awards ===
Award	Recipient	Date	Ref.
Most Valuable Player	Darcee Garbin	5 February 2020	
Players' Player	Micaela Cocks	5 February 2020	
Coaches Award	Micaela Cocks	5 February 2020	
Club Person of the Year	Kate Gaze	5 February 2020	
Commitment to Excellence Award	Tess Madgen	5 February 2020	
