= 2018–19 WNBL season =

- League: Women's National Basketball League
- Sport: Basketball
- Duration: 12 October 2018 – 16 February 2019
- Teams: 8
- TV partner(s): SBS; Fox Sports

Regular season
- Top seed: Canberra Capitals
- Season MVP: Kelsey Griffin (CAN)
- Top scorer: Asia Taylor (PER)

Finals
- Champions: Canberra Capitals
- Runners-up: Adelaide Lightning
- Finals MVP: Kelsey Griffin (CAN)

WNBL seasons
- ← 2017–18 2019–20 →

The 2018–19 WNBL season is the 39th season of the competition since its establishment in 1981. The Townsville Fire were the defending champions, however they failed to qualify for the finals. Canberra Capitals won their record eighth championship, defeating Adelaide in the grand final series, 2–1.

Chemist Warehouse was announced as the WNBL's naming rights partner for this season, after signing a three-year deal in July 2018. Spalding again provided equipment including the official game ball, alongside iAthletic supplying team apparel for a second year.

== Standings ==
#	WNBL Championship ladder				
#	Team	W	L	PCT	GP
1	Canberra Capitals	16	5	76.1	21
2	Melbourne Boomers	15	6	71.4	21
3	Adelaide Lightning	13	8	61.9	21
4	Perth Lynx	13	8	61.9	21
5	Dandenong Rangers	9	12	42.8	21
6	Townsville Fire	9	12	42.8	21
7	Bendigo Spirit	7	14	33.3	21
8	Sydney Uni Flames	2	19	9.5	21

== Finals ==
Semifinals
1	Canberra Capitals	2
4	Perth Lynx	0
3	Adelaide Lightning	2
2	Melbourne Boomers	0

Grand Final
1	Canberra Capitals	2
3	Adelaide Lightning	1

== Statistics ==
=== Individual statistic leaders ===
Category	Player	Statistic
Points per game	Asia Taylor (PER)	19.7 PPG
Rebounds per game	Kelsey Griffin (CAN)	11.6 RPG
Assists per game	Kelly Wilson (CAN)	6.1 APG
Steals per game	Nicole Seekamp (ADL)	2.4 SPG
Blocks per game	Marianna Tolo (CAN)	1.8 BPG

=== Individual game highs ===
Category	Player	Statistic
Points	Nia Coffey (ADL)	37
Rebounds	Kelsey Griffin (CAN)	23
Assists	Tess Madgen (TSV)	14
Steals	Nicole Seekamp (ADL)	6
Blocks	Nia Coffey (ADL)	5

== Awards ==
=== Player of the Week ===
Round #	Player	Ref.
Round 1	Kia Nurse (CAN)	
Round 2	Kelsey Griffin (CAN)	
Round 3	Asia Taylor (PER)	
Round 4	Natalie Hurst (BEN)	
Round 5	Lindsay Allen (MEL)	
Round 6	Lindsay Allen (MEL) (2)	
Round 7	Tess Madgen (TSV)	
Round 8	Brittany Smart (SYD)	
Round 9	Lauren Nicholson (ADL)	
Round 10	Rebecca Cole (DAN)	
Round 11	Kelsey Griffin (2) (CAN)	
Round 12	Kia Nurse (2) (CAN)	
Round 13	Rebecca Cole (2) (DAN)	
Round 14	Leilani Mitchell (CAN)	
Round 15	Nia Coffey (ADL)	

=== Team of the Week ===
Round #	Team				
Round 1	Rebecca Cole (DAN)	Kia Nurse (CAN)	Marena Whittle (BEN)	Rebecca Tobin (BEN)	Nia Coffey (ADL)
Round 2	Lindsay Allen (MEL)	Brittany McPhee (PER)	Kelsey Griffin (CAN)	Rebecca Tobin (BEN) (2)	Suzy Batkovic (TSV)
Round 3	Alex Wilson (SYD)	Kia Nurse (CAN) (2)	Asia Taylor (PER)	Nia Coffey (ADL) (2)	Suzy Batkovic (TSV) (2)
Round 4	Natalie Hurst (BEN)	Brittany McPhee (PER) (2)	Stephanie Talbot (MEL)	Asia Taylor (PER) (2)	Kelsey Griffin (CAN) (2)
Round 5	Lindsay Allen (MEL) (2)	Lauren Nicholson (ADL)	Brittany McPhee (PER) (3)	Kelsey Griffin (CAN) (3)	Nadeen Payne (BEN)
Round 6	Lindsay Allen (MEL) (3)	Rebecca Cole (DAN) (2)	Kelsey Griffin (CAN) (4)	Cayla George (MEL)	Suzy Batkovic (TSV) (3)
Round 7	Lindsay Allen (MEL) (4)	Tess Madgen (TSV)	Kelsey Griffin (CAN) (5)	Rebecca Tobin (BEN) (3)	Suzy Batkovic (TSV) (4)
Round 8	Brittany Smart (SYD)	Nicole Seekamp (ADL)	Alison Schwagmeyer (PER)	Carley Mijović (DAN)	Cayla George (MEL) (2)
Round 9	Tahlia Tupaea (SYD)	Lauren Nicholson (ADL) (2)	Asia Taylor (PER) (3)	Kelsey Griffin (CAN) (6)	Kayla Pedersen (DAN)
Round 10	Rebecca Cole (DAN) (3)	Betnijah Laney (DAN)	Ally Malott (TSV)	Kelsey Griffin (CAN) (7)	Kayla Alexander (ADL)
Round 11	Stephanie Talbot (MEL) (2)	Colleen Planeta (ADL)	Asia Taylor (PER) (4)	Kelsey Griffin (CAN) (8)	Rebecca Tobin (BEN) (4)
Round 12	Lindsay Allen (MEL) (5)	Leilani Mitchell (CAN)	Kia Nurse (CAN) (3)	Belinda Snell (SYD)	Nia Coffey (ADL) (3)
Round 13	Rebecca Cole (DAN) (4)	Nicole Seekamp (ADL) (2)	Asia Taylor (PER) (5)	Kelsey Griffin (CAN) (9)	Eziyoda Magbegor (MEL)
Round 14	Leilani Mitchell (CAN) (2)	Jenna O'Hea (MEL)	Asia Taylor (PER) (6)	Kelsey Griffin (CAN) (10)	Nia Coffey (ADL) (4)
Round 15	Abigail Wehrung (BEN)	Madeleine Garrick (MEL)	Belinda Snell (SYD) (2)	Kelsey Griffin (CAN) (11)	Nia Coffey (ADL) (5)

=== Player & Coach of the Month Awards ===
For games played	Player of the Month		Coach of the Month	
For games played	Player	Team	Coach	Team
October 2018	Kia Nurse	Canberra Capitals	Paul Goriss	Canberra Capitals
November 2018	Lindsay Allen	Melbourne Boomers	Andy Stewart	Perth Lynx
December 2018	Kelsey Griffin	Canberra Capitals	Chris Lucas	Adelaide Lightning

=== Postseason Awards ===
Award	Winner	Position	Team
Most Valuable Player	Kelsey Griffin	Forward	Canberra Capitals
Grand Final MVP	Kelsey Griffin	Forward	Canberra Capitals
Rookie of the Year	Jazmin Shelley	Guard	Melbourne Boomers
Defensive Player of the Year	Lauren Nicholson	Forward	Adelaide Lightning
Top Shooter Award	Asia Taylor	Forward	Perth Lynx
Coach of the Year	Chris Lucas	Coach	Adelaide Lightning
All-Star Five	Lindsay Allen	Guard	Melbourne Boomers
All-Star Five	Rebecca Cole	Guard	Dandenong Rangers
All-Star Five	Asia Taylor	Forward	Perth Lynx
All-Star Five	Nia Coffey	Forward	Adelaide Lightning
All-Star Five	Kelsey Griffin	Forward	Canberra Capitals

== Team captains and coaches ==
Team	Captain	Coach
Adelaide Lightning	Stephanie Blicavs / Nicole Seekamp (co)	Chris Lucas
Bendigo Spirit	Natalie Hurst	Simon Pritchard
Canberra Capitals	Kelsey Griffin / Marianna Tolo (co)	Paul Goriss
Dandenong Rangers	Amelia Todhunter	Larissa Anderson
Melbourne Boomers	Jenna O'Hea	Guy Molloy
Perth Lynx	Katie-Rae Ebzery / Antonia Farnworth (co)	Andy Stewart
Sydney Uni Flames	Belinda Snell	Cheryl Chambers
Townsville Fire	Suzy Batkovic	Claudia Brassard
