= Abby Cubillo =

Australian basketball player

Personal information
- Born: 18 May 1999 (age 27) Darwin, Northern Territory, Australia
- Listed height: 163 cm (5 ft 4 in)

Career information
- High school: Barker College (Sydney, New South Wales); Lake Ginninderra College (Canberra, ACT)
- Playing career: 2015–present
- Position: Guard

Career history
- 2015: Hornsby Spiders
- 2016–2017: BA Centre of Excellence
- 2018–2019: Canberra Capitals Academy
- 2018–2022: Canberra Capitals
- 2020–2021: Canberra Nationals
- 2022–2023: Brisbane Capitals
- 2022–2023: Adelaide Lightning
- 2024: Southern Districts Spartans
- 2024: Mainland Pouakai
- 2025: East Perth Eagles

Career highlights
- 2× WNBL champion (2019, 2019–20); All-NBL1 West Second Team (2025); NBL1 North First Team (2022)
Medals
Representing Australia
Basketball
FIBA Under-17 World Championship for Women
Gold medal – first place	2016 Spain	Team

Abby Lorna Cubillo (born 18 May 1999) is an Australian professional basketball player. She played five seasons in the Women's National Basketball League (WNBL) between 2018 and 2023.

== Early life and career ==
Cubillo was born in Darwin, Northern Territory. She is of Aboriginal Australian descent through her father, one of the Larrakia, the traditional owners of the Darwin region. She left Darwin and moved to Sydney, where she boarded at Barker College, and won a gold medal at the Pacific School Games.

In 2015, Cubillo played for the Hornsby Spiders in the Waratah League. 14 games, she averaged 8.8 points, 2.1 rebounds and 1.8 assists per game.

In November 2015, Cubillo was awarded one of eight places in the Centre of Excellence program at the Australian Institute of Sport (AIS) in Canberra. She became the second Northern Territorian to be awarded an AIS basketball scholarship, the first being Toni Gabelish, who was there in 1990 and 1991, and who also played for the Tracey Village Jets in the Northern Territory. In Canberra she studied at the Lake Ginninderra Secondary College.

In 2016 and 2017, Cubillo played for the BA Centre of Excellence in the South East Australian Basketball League (SEABL). She then played for the Canberra Capitals Academy in the 2018 SEABL season.

== Professional career ==
Cubillo joined the University of Canberra Capitals of the Women's National Basketball League (WNBL) for the 2018–19 season. She debuted against the Sydney Uni Flames at Brydens Stadium on 12 October 2018, becoming the first player born and raised in the Northern Territory to play in the WNBL. The Capitals won 97–78; although on the court for only 2 minutes and 42 seconds, she took a rebound and was credited with an assist. For the WNBL indigenous round in December 2018, she unveiled indigenous-themed uniforms that the Capitals wore in their game against the Perth Lynx. The Capitals went on to win the WNBL finals, and while Cubillo did not take to the court during the three-game final series, as part of the team she became a WNBL champion.

In 2019, Cubillo played a second season for the Canberra Capitals Academy, this time in the Waratah League.

In the 2019–20 WNBL season, Cubillo helped the Capitals win their second straight WNBL championship. In 21 games, she averaged 1.3 points per game.

In 2020, Cubillo had a one-game stint with the Canberra Nationals in the Waratah League. In the 2020 WNBL Hub season in Queensland, Cubillo played 14 games for the Capitals. She then played nine games for the Canberra Nationals in the 2021 Waratah League season.

Cubillo re-joined the Capitals for the 2021–22 WNBL season. She then played for the Brisbane Capitals of the NBL1 North in the 2022 season, where she was named to the NBL1 North First Team.

Cubillo joined the Adelaide Lightning for the 2022–23 WNBL season. She then re-joined the Brisbane Capitals for the 2023 NBL1 North season. She tore her ACL during the 2023 season. Prior to her injury, Cubillo averaged 17.7 points, 4.7 rebounds and 3.5 assists for Brisbane in seven games.

Cubillo joined the Southern Districts Spartans for the 2024 NBL1 North season. She then played for the Mainland Pouakai of the Tauihi Basketball Aotearoa in the 2024 season.

Cubillo joined the East Perth Eagles of the NBL1 West for the 2025 season. On 5 July 2025, she recorded a triple-double with 21 points, 12 rebounds and 10 assists in a 116–112 double overtime loss to the Goldfields Giants. She was named to the All-NBL1 West Second Team.

== National team ==
Cubillo was the starting point guard for the Australia women's national under-17 basketball team (Sapphires) at the 2016 FIBA Under-17 World Championship for Women in Spain in July 2016, where the Sapphires won gold. In September, she was selected as part of the Australia women's national under-19 basketball team (Gems) squad for the 2017 FIBA Under-19 Women's Basketball World Cup in Italy.
