= Paul Goriss =

Australian basketball coach

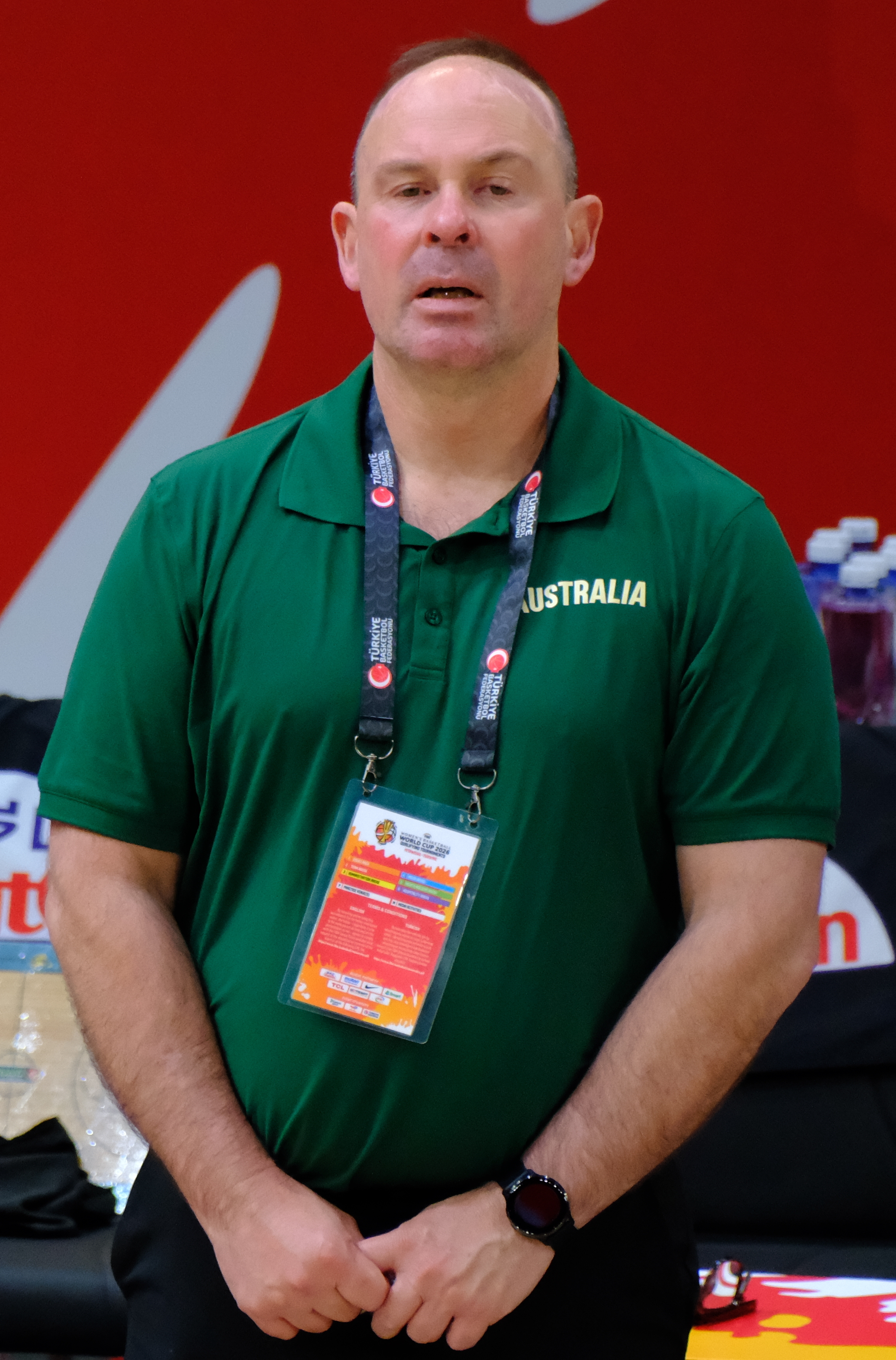
- Goriss in 2026

Canberra Capitals
- Position: Head coach
- League: WNBL
- Coaching career: 2015–present

Career history

Coaching
- 2015–2016: South East Queensland Stars (assistant)
- 2016: South East Queensland Stars
- 2016–2022: Canberra Capitals
- 2022–2024: Atlanta Dream (assistant)
- 2023–2024: Canberra Capitals (assistant)
- 2024–present: Canberra Capitals

Career highlights
- 2× WNBL champion (2019, 2019–20); WNBL Coach of the Year (2019–20)

Paul Goriss is an Australian basketball coach. He is currently head coach of the University of Canberra Capitals in the WNBL and assistant coach of the Atlanta Dream in the WNBA. He is also an assistant coach of the Australian women's national basketball team (the Opals).

== Early life and career ==
Goriss moved to Townsville when he was ten years old, and began playing basketball there. When he was seventeen he was asked to coach his younger brother Ben's under-14 side. He wound up coaching his brother' teams for several years, right up to the under-23s. He won two state titles with the Townsville under-18s. In 2000, he moved to Canberra to take up a position as scholarship coach with the Australian Institute of Sport (AIS) men's basketball program. At the end of 2000, he moved back to Townsville to coach the Townsville Heat and in 2003 he was offered a position back at the AIS as assistant coach of the men's basketball program.

Goriss was associate women's coach for the BA Centre of Excellence from 2013 to 2016.

== Professional career ==
Goriss' first WNBL coaching experience was with the South East Queensland Stars, where he served as an assistant before being promoted to head coach for the last five games of the 2015–16 season.

In March 2016, Goriss was appointed head coach of the University of Canberra Capitals in succession to Carrie Graf. The team required some rebuilding in the wake of the retirement of Graf and veteran players Jess Bibby and Lauren Jackson. Goriss assembled a team with championship material on paper, with captain Natalie Hurst, Abbey Wehrung and Kate Gaze, but after an opening round win, the Capitals went on a thirteen-game losing streak, missing the finals for the seventh year in a row, and finishing sixth.

For the 2018–19 season, the Capitals signed Kelly Wilson, Kelsey Griffin, Kristy Wallace, Marianna Tolo, Leilani Mitchell, and Canadian Kia Nurse. Goriss retained Carly Wilson as an assistant coach, and she was joined on the coaching bench by Phil Brown and Bec Goddard. The team looked impressive on paper, but were carrying a host of ailments. The Capitals won six of the first eight games without Tolo, and gradually became stronger as Tolo, Griffin and Mitchell recovered. Goriss was intensely protective of his players, and was fined $2,500 for comments he made that were critical of the referees and officials after rough conduct by Perth Lynx player left Kelsey Griffin bleeding profusely from a head wound. The season ended with the Capitals winning nine games in a row, and finishing on top of the ladder. This became eleven after the Capitals notched up back-to-back semifinal wins against the Lynx. He guided the Capitals to a 2–1 grand final series win over the Adelaide Lightning to win the championship.

On 4 March 2019, Goriss's contract with the Capitals was extended for another two years. His retention was considered crucial to the Capitals re-signing players like Tolo, Griffin and Keely Froling. His popularity with the players is partly explained by his philosophy of putting the goals of the athletes first. "Whether you get recognised or not", he told an interview, "just do the right thing by the players, work on being a better coach and the players achieving their goals, not 'what next on my bucket list?'" He guided the Capitals to back-to-back titles in the 2019–20 WNBL season and was named WNBL Coach of the Year.

Goriss continued as coach in the 2020 WNBL Hub season in Queensland and again in 2021–22. He left the Capitals after six seasons.

Goriss joined the Atlanta Dream as an assistant coach for the 2022 WNBA season. He returned to Dream for the 2023 WNBA season.

Goriss returned to the Capitals as an assistant under head coach Kristen Veal for the 2023–24 WNBL season. He then returned to the Dream for a third season as an assistant in 2024.

On 14 June 2024, Goriss was appointed head coach of the Capitals for the 2024–25 WNBL season after Veal stepped down for medical reasons. In May 2025, he re-signed with the Capitals for the 2025–26 WNBL season.

In February 2026, Goriss signed a two-year contract extension with the Capitals.

== National team career ==
Goriss was an assistant coach of the Australian men's national under-19 basketball team (the Emus) that competed at the 2011 and 2013 FIBA Under-19 World Championships, and of South East Queensland Stars in the Women's National Basketball League (WNBL) during the latter part of the 2015/16 season. He was head coach of the Australian women's national under-19 basketball team (the Gems) at the 2015 FIBA Under-19 World Championship for Women in Russia, where they won bronze.

On 2 May 2017, Goriss was appointed an assistant coach of the Australian women's national basketball team (the Opals), working under the Opals' head coach Sandy Brondello, and alongside the Sydney University Flames' coach Cheryl Chambers, who was also named as an assistant coach. In the Opals' run up to the 2020 Tokyo Olympic Games, their immediate challenge was the 2017 FIBA Women's Asia Cup in Bangalore, India, in July 2017, where Australia needed a fourth-place finish in order to qualify for the FIBA Women's Basketball World Cup; they finished second, losing to Japan in the final. At the 2018 FIBA Women's Basketball World Cup in Tenerife, Spain, the Opals won silver, this time losing out to the United States in the final on 30 September 2018.

In February 2025, Goriss was appointed as associate head coach of the Opals.
