= Alice Kunek =

Australian basketball player

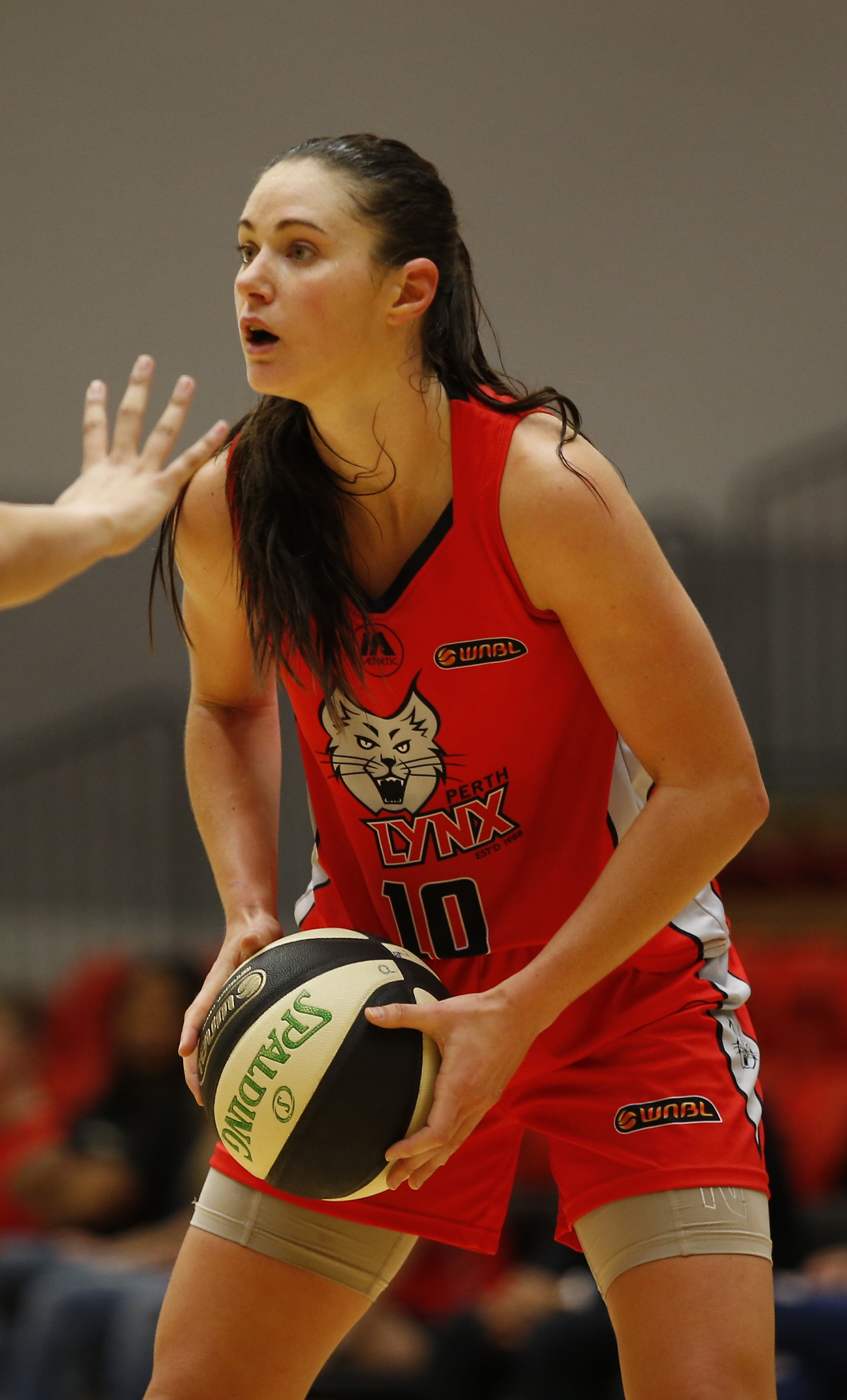
- Kunek in action with the Perth Lynx

No. 1 – Sopron Basket
- Position: Forward
- League: EuroLeague Women

Personal information
- Born: 6 January 1991 (age 35) Melbourne, Victoria, Australia
- Listed height: 187 cm (6 ft 2 in)

Career information
- High school: Caulfield Grammar (Melbourne, Victoria); Lake Ginninderra College (Canberra, ACT)
- Playing career: 2007–present

Career history
- 2007–2010: AIS
- 2010–2013: Bulleen Boomers
- 2013–2015: Dandenong Rangers
- 2015–2017: Melbourne Boomers
- 2017: Lyon Basket féminin
- 2017–2018: Perth Lynx
- 2018–2019: Tarbes Gespe Bigorre
- 2019–2020: Sydney Uni Flames
- 2020–2022: Arka Gdynia
- 2022–2024: Sopron Basket
- 2024–: Southside Flyers
- 2024: Inner Mongolia WCBA
- 2025- current: Beijing WCBA

Career highlights
- WNBL champion (2011)
Medals
Basketball
Representing Australia
Commonwealth Games
Gold medal – first place	2018 Gold Coast
FIBA Asia Cup
Silver medal – second place	2017 India
Bronze medal – third place	2023 Australia
FIBA Oceania Championships
Gold medal – first place	2015 Australia / New Zealand
FIBA 3x3 World Championships
Bronze medal – third place	2012 Athens
World University Games
Bronze medal – third place	2013 Kazan

Alice Kunek (born 6 January 1991) is an Australian-Irish professional basketball player for Beijing in the WCBA, WCBA.

== Early life ==
Kunek was born in Melbourne, Victoria, in the suburb of Box Hill.

== Professional career ==
=== WNBL ===
Kunek began her WNBL career at the AIS alongside fellow up and coming players. She spent three seasons at the AIS, before moving signing with the Bulleen Boomers, where she played for three seasons. In her first season with the Boomers, she helped them take home their inaugural WNBL Championship, averaging 9.9 points per game. In 2013, Kunek left the Boomers and signed with the Dandenong Rangers. In her first season with the Rangers, Kunek averaged a career high 15.9 points per game. After two seasons with the Rangers, she returned to the Melbourne Boomers. Kunek was named captain of the Melbourne Boomers ahead of the 2016–17 season.

On 16 May 2017, Kunek signed with the Perth Lynx for the 2017–18 WNBL season. On 8 November 2017, Kunek was named to the WNBL Team of the Week, after scoring 25 points, including five three-pointers, in her team's victory over the Townsville Fire. On 29 December 2017, Kunek played her 200th career WNBL game.

=== Overseas ===
At the conclusion of the 2016/17 WNBL season, she joined French side Lyon Basket féminine for the remainder of their season. Kunek played 10 games with Lyon, averaging 6.3 points and 5.1 rebounds, and helped her side avoid relegation. On 17 January 2018, Kunek signed as an injury replacement for French side Tarbes Gespe Bigorre.

== National team ==
Kunek was a member of the Gems. She was then named to the Gems squad and helped them take home the Gold at the Oceania Under-18 Championship and qualify for the World Championship the following year in Thailand. Playing alongside, Elizabeth Cambage, the team placed fifth. In 2015, Kunek was named to the Opals side for the 2015 FIBA Oceania Women's Championship. She was once again named to the Opals squad, in the lead up to the 2016 Summer Olympics. However, as the squad was dropped down to 17 members, Kunek was cut from the Olympic squad.

Kunek joined the Opals side ahead of the 2017 FIBA Asia Cup, where Australia took home Silver. In December 2017, Kunek was named to the Opals training camp squad ahead of the 2018 Commonwealth Games.

== Personal life ==
Kunek is currently studying a Master of International Business at Deakin University.

== See also ==
- List of Caulfield Grammar School people
