= Brittany McPhee =

American basketball player

Personal information
- Born: 12 January 1996 (age 30) Seattle, Washington
- Listed height: 6 ft 0 in (1.83 m)

Career information
- High school: Mount Rainier (Des Moines, Washington)
- College: Stanford (2014–2018)
- WNBA draft: 2018: undrafted
- Playing career: 2018–present
- Position: Guard

Career history
- 2018–2019: Perth Lynx

Career highlights
- 2x All-Pac 12 (2017, 2018)

Brittany McPhee (born 12 January 1996) is an American professional basketball player.

== College career ==
McPhee began her college career at Stanford University in Stanford, California for the Cardinal. During her time at Stanford, McPhee achieved several accolades from a range of platforms and the Pac-12 Conference of NCAA Division I. This included the 2017 Pac-12 All-Academic Second Team and 2018 Pac-12 All-Academic First Team.

=== College statistics ===
Year	Team	GP	GS	MPG	FG%	3P%	FT%	RPG	APG	SPG	BPG	PPG
2014–15	Stanford	30	8	9.9	.359	.194	.780	2.3	0.3	0.4	0.5	3.5
2015–16	Stanford	34	3	16.6	.414	.343	.737	3.1	0.6	0.3	0.4	6.5
2016–17	Stanford	37	37	29.0	.446	.709	.772	4.9	2.0	0.8	0.9	13.3
2017–18	Stanford	26	26	31.7	.447	.267	.687	5.4	2.4	1.3	0.7	16.7
Career		127	74	21.7	.433	.288	.716	3.9	1.3	0.7	0.6	9.8

== Professional career ==
=== WNBA ===
McPhee was signed as a free-agent to the Seattle Storm training camp roster in April 2018. However, a month later McPhee was then waived by the storm.

=== WNBL ===
In September 2018, McPhee was signed by the Perth Lynx in the Women's National Basketball League.
