= Mercedes Russell =

American basketball player (born 1995)

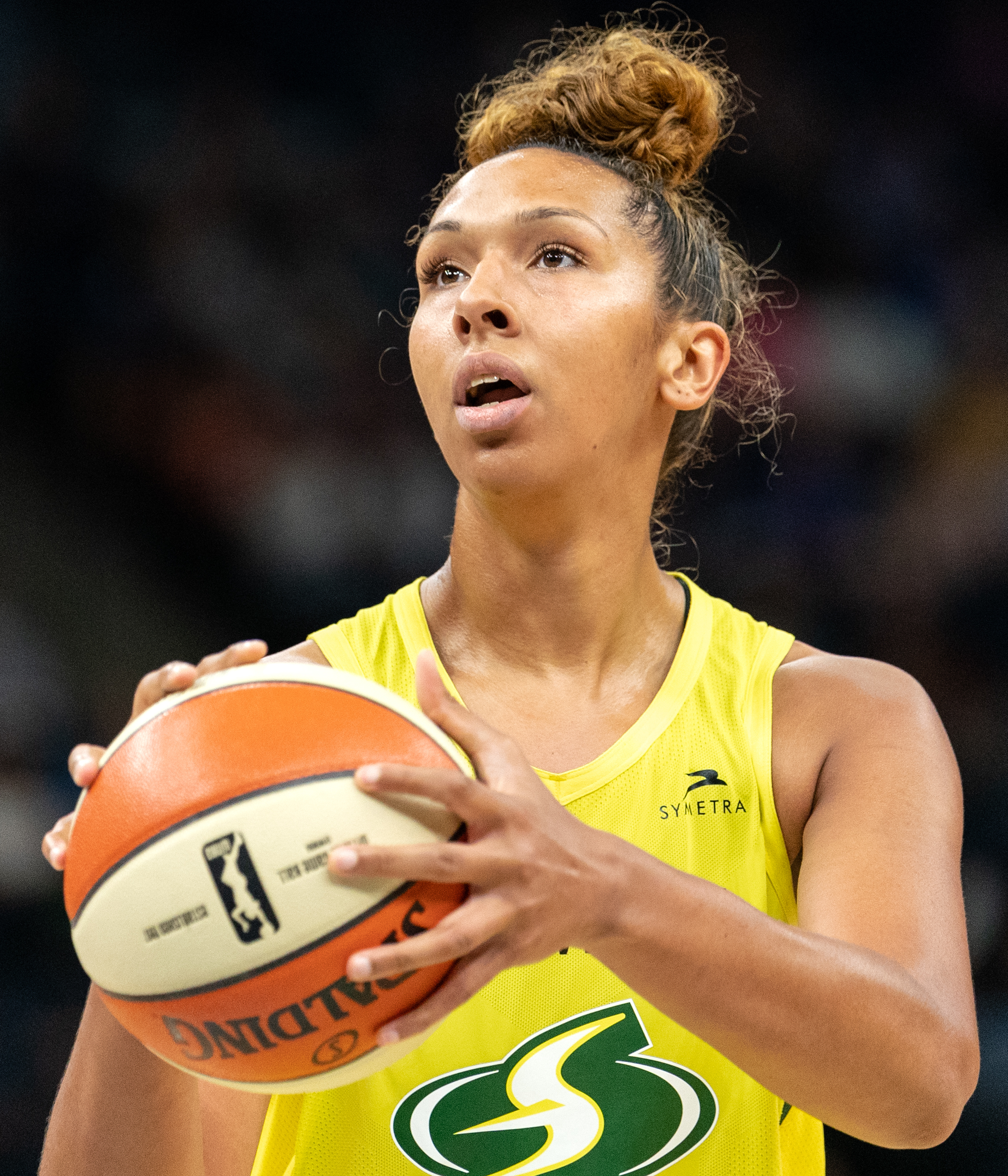
- Russell with the Seattle Storm in 2019

No. 5 – Indiana Fever
- Position: Center
- League: WNBA

Personal information
- Born: July 27, 1995 (age 31) Springfield, Oregon, U.S.
- Listed height: 6 ft 6 in (1.98 m)
- Listed weight: 195 lb (88 kg)

Career information
- High school: Springfield (Springfield, Oregon)
- College: Tennessee (2013–2018)
- WNBA draft: 2018: 2nd round, 22nd overall pick
- Drafted by: New York Liberty
- Playing career: 2018–present

Career history
- 2018: New York Liberty
- 2018–2024: Seattle Storm
- 2019–2020: Southside Flyers
- 2020–2021: Galatasaray
- 2023–2024: Southside Flyers
- 2024: Heilongjiang Dragons
- 2025: Shanxi Flame
- 2025: Los Angeles Sparks
- 2026–present: Indiana Fever

Career highlights
- 2× WNBA champion (2018, 2020); WNBA Commissioner's Cup champion (2021); WNBL champion (2024); WNBL Grand Final MVP (2024); First-team All-SEC (2018); Gatorade National Player of the Year (2013); McDonald's All-American Game MVP (2013)
- Stats at Basketball Reference
Medals
Women's basketball
Representing the United States
2015 Summer Universiade
Gold medal – first place	2015 Gwangju	Team
FIBA Under-17 World Cup
Gold medal – first place	2012 Netherlands	Team
FIBA Americas Under-16 Championship
Gold medal – first place	2011 Mexico	Team

Mercedes Brianna Russell (born July 27, 1995) is an American professional basketball player for the Indiana Fever of the Women's National Basketball Association (WNBA). She was drafted 22nd overall by the New York Liberty in the 2018 WNBA draft. Russell played college basketball for Tennessee. In high school, she was named 2013 Gatorade Girls' Basketball Player of the Year.

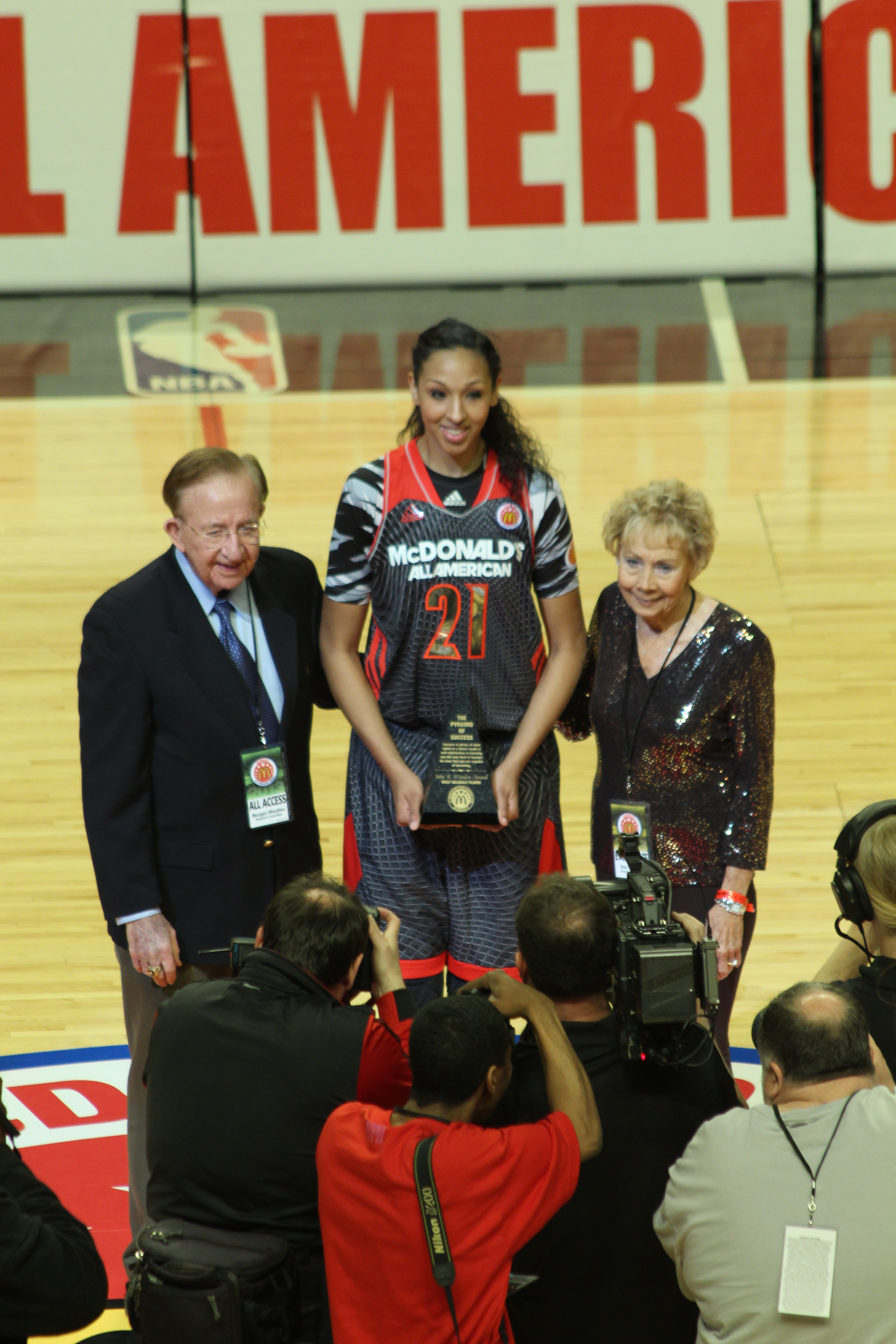
Russell was MVP of the 2013 McDonalds All-American game

== College career ==
Russell played college basketball at the University of Tennessee in Knoxville, Tennessee for the Lady Volunteers.

== Professional career ==
=== WNBA ===
At the 2018 WNBA draft, Russell was drafted in the second round by the New York Liberty. After making her WNBA debut with the Liberty, Russell was waived and soon after picked up by the Seattle Storm. In joining the Storm's line-up featuring players such as Sue Bird, Breanna Stewart and Natasha Howard, Russell would take home a WNBA Championship in her first professional season. She played with the Storm 2018-2024.

On February 11, 2025, Russell signed with the Los Angeles Sparks. On July 12, 2025, she was waived by the Sparks.

On August 10, 2026, she signed with the Indiana Fever as a season-ending injury exception.

=== WNBL ===
In 2019, Russell was signed by the newly rebranded Southside Flyers in Australia's Women's National Basketball League (WNBL). There she would play alongside the likes of Leilani Mitchell and Jenna O'Hea.

With the Flyers in the 2023–24 WNBL season, Russell helped the team win the championship while earning grand final MVP honours.

== Career statistics ==
Legend
GP	Games played	GS	Games started	MPG	Minutes per game	RPG	Rebounds per game
APG	Assists per game	SPG	Steals per game	BPG	Blocks per game	PPG	Points per game
TO	Turnovers per game	FG%	Field-goal percentage	3P%	3-point field-goal percentage	FT%	Free-throw percentage
**Bold**	Career best	°	League leader

=== WNBA ===
==== Regular season ====
WNBA regular season statistics
Year	Team	GP	GS	MPG	FG%	3P%	FT%	RPG	APG	SPG	BPG	TO	PPG
2018^{†}	New York	2	0	16.0	.333	—	.750	1.5	1.0	1.0	**.5**	.5	2.5
2018^{†}	Seattle	22	0	4.6	.484	—	.500	1.4	.1	.0	.1	.3	1.6
2019	Seattle	34	**30**	**25.6**	.520	—	.646	**6.1**	1.0	**1.1**	**.5**	1.0	**7.5**
2020^{†}	Seattle	22	2	13.8	.410	—	.560	3.2	.6	.4	.4	.7	3.5
2021	Seattle	30	28	24.7	**.617**	—	**.766**	**6.1**	**1.6**	.9	.4	1.3	7.3
2022	Seattle	5	0	10.8	.500	—	.667	1.8	.2	.0	.0	1.4	2.0
2023	Seattle	**37**	13	19.1	.516	.000	.605	4.0	1.3	.4	**.5**	1.5	5.0
2024	Seattle	**37**	6	15.7	.517	—	.636	3.0	.8	.6	.2	.7	3.9
2025	Los Angeles	20	0	8.2	.444	—	.714	1.2	.6	.3	.2	.4	1.7
2026	Indiana	7	0	9.7	.250	—	.700	1.1	.6	.6	.0	**.1**	1.6
**Career**	9 years, 4 teams	216	79	16.8	.518	.000	.655	3.7	.9	.6	.3	.9	4.5

==== Playoffs ====
WNBA playoff statistics
Year	Team	GP	GS	MPG	FG%	3P%	FT%	RPG	APG	SPG	BPG	TO	PPG
2018^{†}	Seattle	1	0	4.0	—	—	—	1.0	.0	.0	.0	**.0**	.0
2019	Seattle	2	**2**	32.0	**.769**°	—	**1.000**	8.5	2.0	.0	1.0	1.0	**11.5**
2020^{†}	Seattle	**6**	0	17.5	.619	—	**1.000**	3.8	1.0	.2	.2	.8	5.2
2021	Seattle	1	1	**45.0**°	.556	—	—	**12.0**°	**4.0**	.0	**2.0**	**.0**	10.0
2024	Seattle	2	1	23.0	.500	—	**1.000**	7.0	.0	**.5**	.0	2.5	5.0
2026	Indiana	1	0	4.0	—	—	—	1.0	1.0	.0	.0	**.0**	.0
**Career**	6 years, 2 teams	13	4	20.6	.627	—	1.000	5.2	1.2	.2	.4	.9	5.7

=== College ===
Year	Team	GP	GS	MPG	FG%	3P%	FT%	RPG	APG	SPG	BPG	TO	PPG
2013–14	Tennessee	35	5	18.5	**.596**	.000	.514	5.0	.5	.4	1.1	**1.2**	6.3
2014–15	Tennessee	Injured											
2015–16	Tennessee	**36**	31	29.3	.548	.000	.545	8.3	.8	.4	**1.8**	1.6	9.9
2016–17	Tennessee	32	32	**34.6**	.562	.000	.671	**9.7**	**1.2**	.7	1.4	2.0	**16.1**
2017–18	Tennessee	33	**33**	32.7	.583	.000	**.682**	9.2	.8	**1.1**	1.3	1.4	15.3
Career		136	101	28.6	.570	.000	.622	8.0	.8	.6	1.4	1.6	11.7
