= Katie-Rae Ebzery =

Australian basketball player

Personal information
- Born: 8 January 1990 (age 36) Newcastle, New South Wales, Australia
- Listed height: 178 cm (5 ft 10 in)
- Listed weight: 70 kg (154 lb)

Career information
- High school: St Mary's (Newcastle, New South Wales)
- Playing career: 2005–2021
- Position: Shooting guard / small forward

Career history
- 2005–2008: Australian Institute of Sport
- 2008–2012: Newcastle Hunters
- 2008–2009: Dandenong Rangers
- 2010–2016: Sydney Uni Flames
- 2014: Hornsby Spiders
- 2015: BA Centre of Excellence
- 2016: Newcastle Hunters
- 2016–2017: Dynamo Moscow
- 2017–2018: Sydney Uni Flames
- 2018–2020: Perth Lynx
- 2021: Newcastle Hunters

Career highlights
- 3× All-WNBL First Team (2016, 2019–20, 2020); 2× Waratah League champion (2014, 2021); Waratah League Grand Final MVP (2014); Waratah League MVP (2011)
Medals
Representing Australia
Women's basketball
FIBA World Cup
Silver medal – second place	2018 Spain	Team
FIBA Asia Cup
Silver medal – second place	2017 Bangalore	Team
Bronze medal – third place	2019 Bangalore	Team
FIBA Oceania Championships
Gold medal – first place	2015 Australia / New Zealand	Team
Commonwealth Games
Gold medal – first place	2018 Gold Coast	Team
Summer Universiade
Bronze medal – third place	2011 Shenzhen	Team
Bronze medal – third place	2013 Kazan	Team
3x3 basketball
FIBA 3x3 World Championships
Bronze medal – third place	2012 Athens	Team

Katie-Rae Ebzery (born 8 January 1990), also known as Katie Ebzery, is an Australian former professional basketball player who played 15 seasons in the Women's National Basketball League (WNBL). She was a three-time All-WNBL First Team member and a two-time Olympian with the Australian Opals.

== Early life ==
Ebzery was born in Newcastle, New South Wales, in the suburb of Waratah. From a young age, she would watch her mum and cousins play basketball. She started playing socially at the age of five, and by the age of nine she was playing representative basketball for the Newcastle Hunters. She attended St Mary's High School in Newcastle.

== Professional career ==
Ebzery debuted in the Women's National Basketball League (WNBL) in 2005 with the Australian Institute of Sport (AIS). The talented guard left the AIS after three seasons with 65 WNBL games to her name at just 18 years of age. After playing for the Dandenong Rangers in the 2008–09 season, she stepped away from the WNBL for the 2009–10 season.

In 2010, Ebzery joined the Sydney Uni Flames. In 2014–15, she passed 200 WNBL games and was named the Flames Club MVP after averaging 16.8 points per game, the sixth highest average in the league. She played her sixth season for the Flames in 2015–16 and was named to the WNBL All-Star Five.

For the 2016–17 season, Ebzery moved to Russia to play for Dynamo Moscow.

Ebzery returned to the WNBL and the Sydney Uni Flames for the 2017–18 season.

In June 2018, Ebzery signed a two-year contract with the Perth Lynx. In the 2019–20 season, she was named to the WNBL All-Star First Team.

In June 2020, Ebzery re-signed with the Lynx. In the 2020 WNBL Hub season in Queensland, she was named to the All-WNBL First Team. She finished the regular season fourth (18.0) in scoring and ninth (3.6) in assists.

In October 2021, Ebzery retired from the WNBL after 15 seasons and 304 games.

=== Off-season stints ===
Between 2008 and 2012, Ebzery played for the Newcastle Hunters in the Waratah League. She was named Waratah League MVP in 2011. In 2014, she played for the Hornsby Spiders and helped them win the Waratah League championship with a grand final MVP performance. In 2015, she played for the BA Centre of Excellence in the SEABL. In 2016, she had a short stint with the Hunters. In 2021, she played four games for the Hunters, who were crowned champions following the season's cancellation due to the COVID-19 pandemic.

== National team career ==
In 2007, Ebzery represented Australia at the FIBA Under-19 World Championship in Slovakia.

In 2011 and 2013, Ebzery won bronze with the Australian University Team at the World University Games. She also won bronze with the Australian 3x3 team at the inaugural FIBA 3x3 World Championships in 2012.

Ebzery made her Australian Opals debut at the 2015 FIBA Oceania Championship, where the Opals claimed gold. In 2016, she played for the Opals at the Olympic Test Event in Rio de Janeiro, and later in the Rio Olympics.

In 2017, Ebzery played for the Opals at the FIBA Women's Asia Cup, where she helped them win silver in Division A.

In 2018, Ebzery helped the Opals win gold at the Commonwealth Games and silver at the FIBA World Cup.

In 2019, Ebzery helped the Opals win bronze at the FIBA Asia Cup. She later played in the FIBA Olympic pre-qualifying tournament and the FIBA Olympic Qualifying Tournament.

At the Tokyo Olympics in July and August 2021, Ebzery averaged 6.5 points, 3.5 rebounds and 4.3 assists in four games.

== Personal life ==
Ebzery is the daughter of Helen and Robert. She has three siblings, brothers Andrew and Mathew, and sister Alison. Alison made her debut in the WNBL in 2019.

Ebzery married her fiancé Dane in the Hunter Valley on 19 October 2024, and they live in Country NSW.
