= Olivia Époupa =

French basketball player (born 1994)

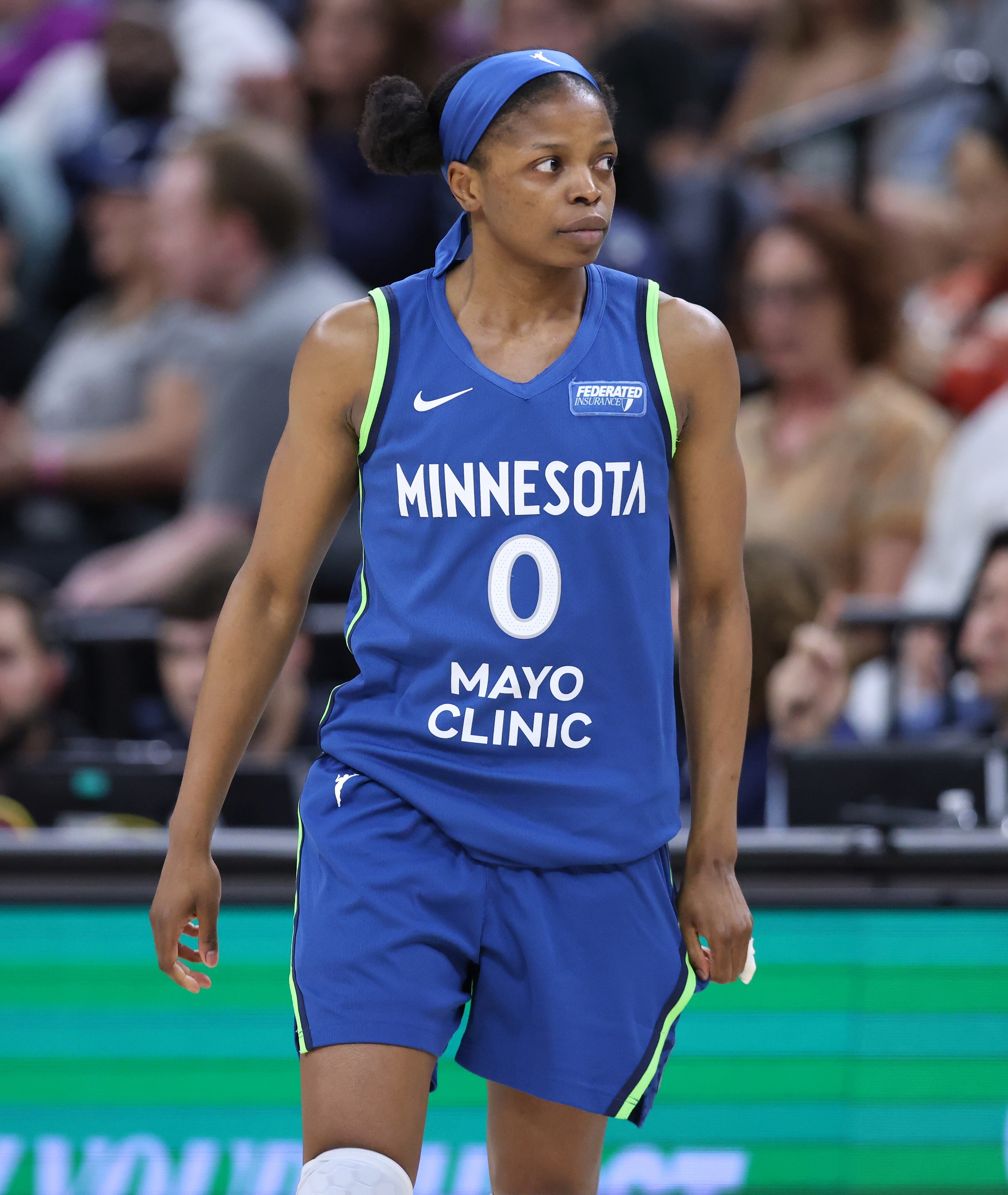
- Époupa with the Minnesota Lynx in 2024

No. 0 – OGM Ormanspor
- Position: Point guard
- League: Turkish Super League

Personal information
- Born: 30 April 1994 (age 32) Paris, France
- Listed height: 5 ft 5 in (1.65 m)
- Listed weight: 117 lb (53 kg)

Career information
- WNBA draft: 2016: undrafted
- Playing career: 2012–present

Career history
- 2012–2014: Basket Landes
- 2014–2016: Toulouse MB
- 2016–2017: Villeneuve-d'Ascq
- 2017–2018: Galatasaray
- 2018–2019: Beşiktaş
- 2019–2020: Canberra Capitals
- 2020–2021: Charnay
- 2021–2022: Basket Lattes Montpellier Agglomération
- 2022–2023: Fenerbahçe Safiport
- 2023: Sopron Basket
- 2023–2024: Çukurova Basketbol Mersin
- 2024: Minnesota Lynx
- 2025–present: OGM Ormanspor

Career highlights
- WNBA Commissioner's Cup Champion (2024); WNBL Grand Final MVP (2020)
- Stats at Basketball Reference

Olivia Époupa (born 30 April 1994) is a French professional basketball player for OGM Ormanspor of the Turkish Super League.

== Professional career ==
=== Europe ===
In January 2025, Époupa joined OGM Ormanspor of the Turkish Super League.

=== WNBA ===
Époupa was signed by the Minnesota Lynx for the 2024 season. In the June 2, 2024, Lynx home game win against the Dallas Wings, Napheesa Collier said Époupa "was the momentum change when she came in... and busted the game open for us." Époupa had 4 points, 4 steals, 2 assists, and 1 rebound in just under 14 minutes of play. The game was her fifth appearance with the Lynx in the 2024 season and was her breakout game for the team. On August 20, 2024, Époupa was traded to the Washington Mystics and was waived on the same day.

Époupa re-signed with the Lynx on the last day of the regular season to a rest of the season contract.

== Career statistics ==
Legend
GP	Games played	GS	Games started	MPG	Minutes per game	RPG	Rebounds per game
APG	Assists per game	SPG	Steals per game	BPG	Blocks per game	PPG	Points per game
TO	Turnovers per game	FG%	Field-goal percentage	3P%	3-point field-goal percentage	FT%	Free-throw percentage
**Bold**	Career best	°	League leader

=== WNBA ===
==== Regular season ====
WNBA regular season statistics
Year	Team	GP	GS	MPG	FG%	3P%	FT%	RPG	APG	SPG	BPG	TO	PPG
2024	Minnesota	17	0	6.7	.375	—	1.000	1.1	1.5	0.8	0.0	0.9	0.8
**Career**	1 year, 1 team	17	0	6.7	.375	—	1.000	1.1	1.5	0.8	0.0	0.9	0.8

==== Playoffs ====
WNBA playoff statistics
Year	Team	GP	GS	MPG	FG%	3P%	FT%	RPG	APG	SPG	BPG	TO	PPG
2024	Minnesota	4	0	0.5	—	—	—	0.0	0.0	0.0	0.0	0.0	0.0
**Career**	1 year, 1 team	4	0	0.5	—	—	—	0.0	0.0	0.0	0.0	0.0	0.0

== Personal life ==
Born in France, Époupa is of Cameroonian descent.
