= Nicole Seekamp =

Australian basketball player

Adelaide Lightning
- Position: Guard
- League: WNBL

Personal information
- Born: 26 April 1992 (age 34) Renmark, South Australia, Australia
- Listed height: 5 ft 10 in (1.78 m)

Career information
- High school: Brighton Secondary (Adelaide, South Australia)
- College: South Dakota (2012–2016)
- WNBA draft: 2016: undrafted
- Playing career: 2009–present

Career history
- 2009–2010: Australian Institute of Sport
- 2010–2011: Adelaide Lightning
- 2016–2017: Gorzów Wielkopolski
- 2017–2020: Adelaide Lightning
- Stats at Basketball Reference
Medals
Representing Australia
Basketball
FIBA Asia Cup
Bronze medal – third place	2019 Bangalore	Team
Commonwealth Games
Gold medal – first place	2018 Gold Coast	Team

Nicole Seekamp (born 26 April 1992) is an Australian professional basketball player.

== College ==
Seekamp played college basketball at the University of South Dakota in Vermillion, South Dakota for the Coyotes. After sitting out the 2011–12 season as a redshirt, Seekamp made her debut in 2012. Seekamp was the 2015–16 Summit League Player of the Year and led the Coyotes to a championship in the Women's National Invitation Tournament. She was named the Most Valuable Player of the 2016 WNIT. Seekamp was a three-time all-Summit League performer (2014–16) and two-time Summit League Tournament MVP (2013, 2015). She graduated from South Dakota as the program's second-leading scorer (2,056 points), second in assists (628) and second in steals (265).

=== Statistics ===
Year	Team	GP	GS	MPG	FG%	3P%	FT%	RPG	APG	SPG	BPG	TO	PPG
2012–13	South Dakota	35	35	29.5	.413	.324	.836	4.0	3.3	1.6	0.2	2.6	14.9
2013–14	South Dakota	28	25	31.2	.380	.319	.885	4.0	3.8	1.8	0.5	2.3	15.5
2014–15	South Dakota	34	34	28.8	.464	.304	.842	3.6	5.1	1.9	0.1	2.5	15.6
2015–16	South Dakota	36	36	30.0	.450	.370	.864	3.9	6.4	2.4	0.1	2.6	15.9
Career		133	130	29.8	.429	.333	.858	3.9	4.7	1.9	0.2	2.5	15.5

== Career ==
=== WNBL ===
Seekamp began her career, playing for the Australian Institute of Sport. After a brief stint, she then signed in her home state, with the Adelaide Lightning beginning with the 2017–18 WNBL season, after signing with the Adelaide Lightning. There, she joins a roster alongside the likes of Abby Bishop and Natalie Novosel. Seekamp garnered WNBL second-team honors in her first season back in Australia with a stat-line of 13.2 points, 5.1 assists, 4.2 rebounds and 2.4 steals per game. After the 2019–20 WNBL season Seekamp announced quit basketball and she has returned to her rural roots, started farmering in New South Wales.

=== Europe ===
Seekamp was signed by AZS PWSZ Gorzów Wielkopolski to play in the Polska Liga Koszykówki Kobiet for 2016–17. She averaged 11 points, five assists and 1.5 steals in her first professional season before deciding to return home to Australia to continue her playing career with the Adelaide Lightning in 2017.

== National team ==
=== Youth level ===
Seekamp made her international debut for the Gems at the 2010 FIBA Oceania Under-18 Championship in Palmerston, New Zealand. Seekamp was not selected for the Gems side for the Under-19 World Championship in Chile the following year.

=== Senior level ===
In March 2018, Seekamp was named to the Opals final roster for the 2018 Commonwealth Games. This would be Seekamp's debut for the Opals and at the senior international level. In 2019, Seekamp would go on to make her Opals debut at an official FIBA event after being named to the Opals roster for the 2019 FIBA Asia Cup.
