= Keely Froling =

Australian basketball player

No. 21 – Tasmania Jewels
- Position: Forward
- League: WNBL

Personal information
- Born: 31 January 1996 (age 30) Townsville, Queensland
- Listed height: 6 ft 2 in (1.88 m)

Career information
- High school: Lake Ginninderra College (Canberra, ACT)
- College: SMU (2014–2016)
- Playing career: 2011–present

Career history
- 2011–2014: Townsville Fire
- 2016–2020: Canberra Capitals
- 2021–2023: Sydney Flames
- 2023–2024: Melbourne Boomers
- 2024–2025: Geelong United
- 2025–2026: Sydney Flames
- 2026–present: Tasmania Jewels

Career highlights
- 2× WNBL champion (2019, 2019–20)
Medals
Representing Australia
Women's basketball
FIBA Asia Cup
Bronze medal – third place	2021 Jordan
Bronze medal – third place	2023 Australia
Summer Universiade
Gold medal – first place	2017 Taiwan	Team
Gold medal – first place	2019 Italy	Team
FIBA Oceania Under-16 Championship
Gold medal – first place	2011 Canberra	Team

Keely Jane Froling (born 31 January 1996) is an Australian professional basketball player.

== Career ==
=== College ===
Froling played college basketball for two years at Southern Methodist University in Dallas, Texas for the SMU Mustangs. Froling decided to return home after her sophomore season, to complete her studies and pursue her career in Australia.

=== WNBL ===
Born and raised in Townsville, Froling would begin her WNBL career in her home town, signed as a development player alongside her twin sister, with the Townsville Fire for the 2011–12 WNBL season. Froling remained a member of the Fire's roster through to 2014. She then departed to begin her college career in the United States. Froling cut her college career short to return to Australia and join the Canberra Capitals. She played five seasons for the Capitals, the last of which came in the 2020 WNBL Hub season. She played for the Sydney Flames in 2021–22 and 2022–23 before joining the Melbourne Boomers for the 2023–24 season. She then joined Geelong United for the 2024–25 season. She returned to the Sydney Flames for the 2025–26 season.

On 17 April 2026, Froling signed with the Tasmania Jewels for the 2026–27 WNBL season, becoming the club's first rostered player signing. In her debut for the Jewels, she sustained a calf muscle strain which ruled her out for several weeks.

=== State league ===
In May 2021, Froling recorded 52 points and 26 rebounds for the Launceston Tornadoes against the Diamond Valley Eagles during the 2021 NBL1 season.

In 2025, Froling re-joined the Tornadoes of the NBL1 South for her fifth season with the club.

In 2026, Froling joined the Northern Force for their inaugural season in the NBL1 South. She was named All-NBL1 South Second Team.

=== National team ===
Froling first played for Australia at the 2011 FIBA Oceania Under-16 Championship for Women where she took home Gold. She would then go on to participate in the world championship in Amsterdam, Netherlands where Australia placed 5th.

== Personal life ==
Froling has a twin sister, Alicia who is also a professional basketball player. She played alongside her in Townsville, SMU and the U17 National team. Their younger brothers, Harry and Sam, have also represented Australia internationally.

Froling's mother, Jenny, was part of the 1991 Hobart Islanders WNBL championship-winning team.
