= National Convention Centre Canberra =

Convention centre in Canberra, Australia

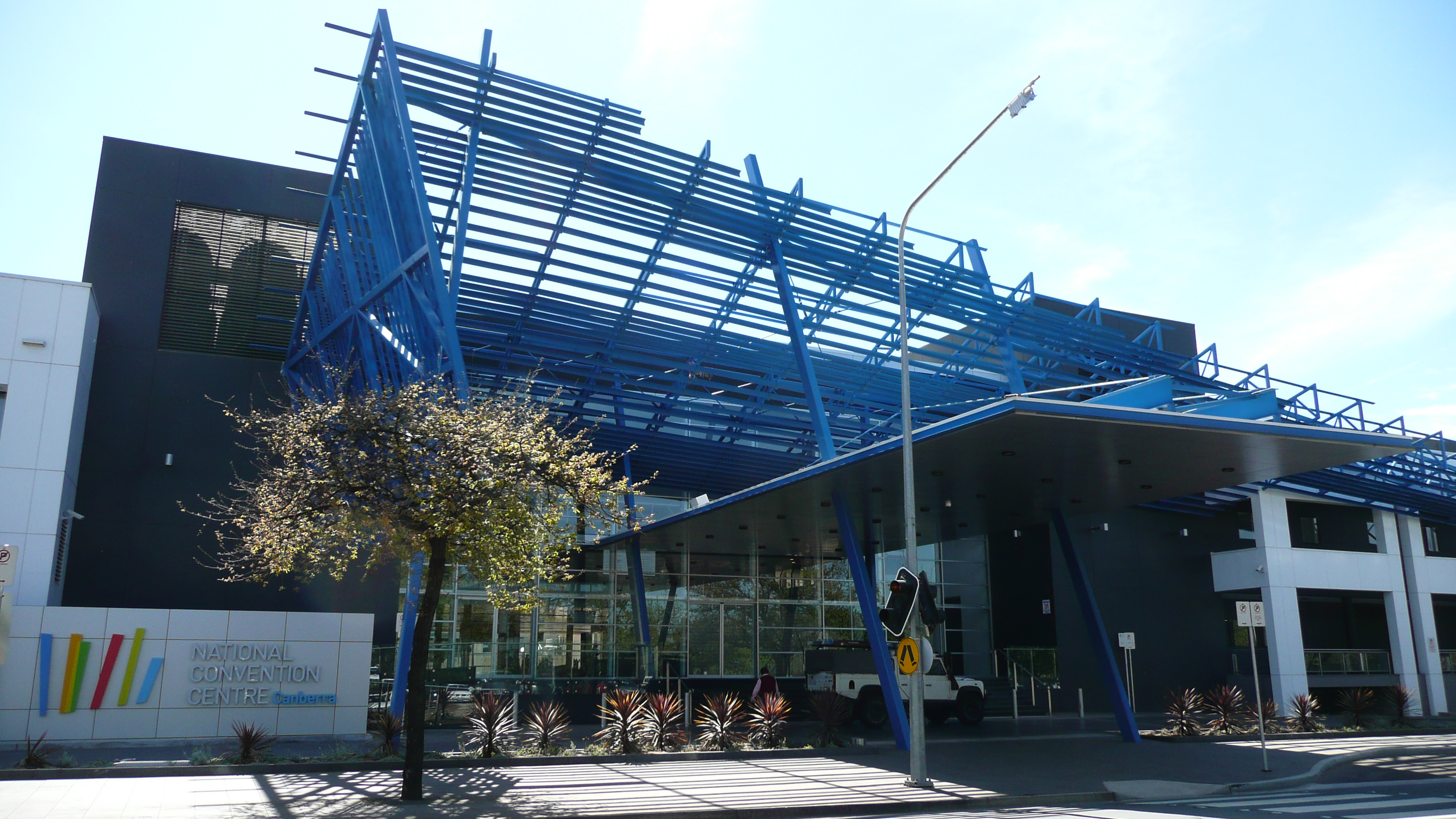
- National Convention Centre in 2008
- Location: Canberra, Australia,
- Coordinates: 35.284619°S 149.134523°E
- Owner: Government of the Australian Capital Territory

Construction
- Opened: 1989
- Renovated: 2005

Website
- Official website

The National Convention Centre Canberra is a convention centre in Canberra, Australia, which opened in 1989. The centre is Canberra's largest, purpose-built functions, meetings and events venue, and is managed by IHG Hotels & Resorts. It provides a collection of more than 13 spaces over two floors.

The centre hosts sporting events, concerts, trade fairs and meetings. The Royal Theatre, the largest space, can accommodate 2,460; the Exhibition Hall has space for up to 2,000. In 2005, the centre underwent a $30 million capital upgrade.

== Events ==
Eric Clapton performed at the venue on 10 November 1990 during his Journeyman World Tour in front of a sold-out crowd of 10,000 people. On the evenings of 12 and 13 March 2009, a reformed Midnight Oil, played at the Royal Theatre.
