= WA Basketball Centre =

Multi sport venue in Perth, Western Australia

Bendat Basketball Centre
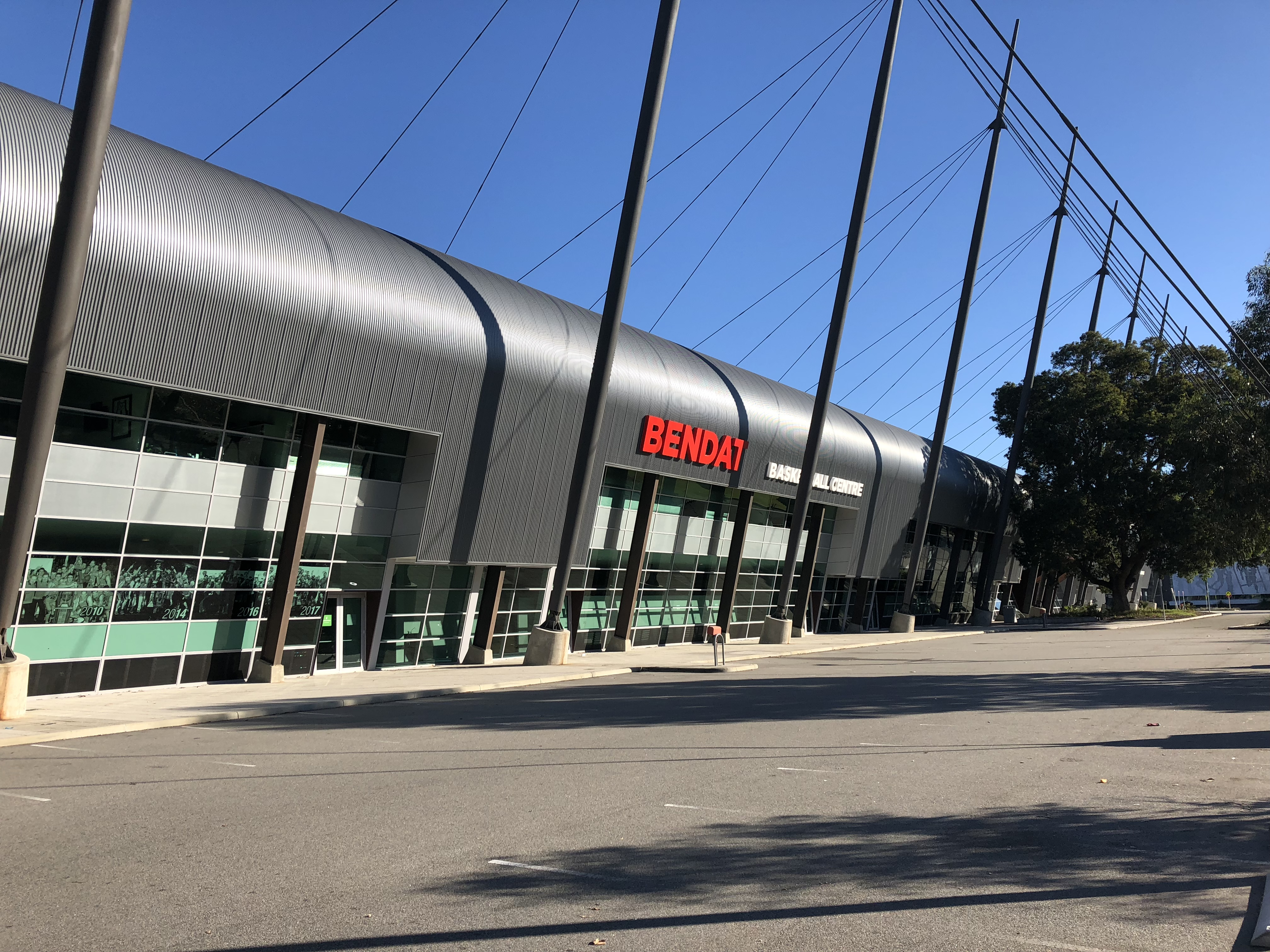
- Interactive map of Bendat Basketball Centre
- Former names: WA Basketball Centre
- Location: Underwood Avenue, Floreat, Western Australia
- Coordinates: 31°56′55″S 115°47′08″E
- Owner: Government of Western Australia
- Operator: Co-managed by Basketball WA and VenuesWest
- Capacity: Basketball: 2,000 (show court)
- Surface: Hardwood

Construction
- Groundbreaking: 2008
- Opened: 24 January 2010
- Cost: A$40m

Tenants
- Basketball Western Australia; Perry Lakes Basketball Association; Perth Wildcats

The WA Basketball Centre (also known by its sponsored name, the Bendat Basketball Centre) is a multi-purpose stadium located in Perth, Western Australia, catering primarily for basketball.

The stadium features eight multi-sport courts, including two show courts with 1,100 permanent seats and 900 retractable seats primarily used for basketball. Facilities also cater for netball, volleyball and badminton. The stadium also holds a function room on the first floor for up to 270 people, with bar and kitchen facilities.

The stadium houses the offices of Basketball Western Australia, Perry Lakes Basketball Association, and the Perth Wildcats. The facility is the main training base of the Wildcats, home court of the Perth Lynx, and hosts many state, junior and social games throughout the year.

== History ==
In 2008, construction started at AK Reserve in Mount Claremont on new athletics and basketball facilities to replace the crumbling former Commonwealth Games facilities at Perry Lakes. Being built across the road from the old Perry Lakes Athletics Stadium and Perry Lakes Basketball Stadium, the new facilities would join the sports precinct which was already home to Challenge Stadium, the Western Australian Institute of Sport, and UWA Sports Park. While the WA Athletics Stadium opened in 2009, the WA Basketball Centre was officially opened on 24 January 2010. The combined construction cost of the WA Athletics Stadium, WA Basketball Centre and supporting infrastructure was $73 million, with the basketball facilities costing approximately $40 million. The WA Rugby Centre later joined the precinct on adjacent land.

On 1 October 2014, Basketball Western Australia took on the day-to-day operations of the stadium under a co-management agreement with VenuesWest, with VenuesWest continuing to maintain the facility after being the sole operator since its opening.

On 6 May 2015, the stadium was renamed Bendat Basketball Centre in a 21-year sponsorship agreement in honour of Perth Wildcats owner Jack Bendat.

On 23 March 2020, the stadium was closed to the public indefinitely due to the COVID-19 pandemic. The stadium was reopened on 25 May 2020, initially in a limited capacity.

In May 2026, courts 1 and 2 at Bendat Basketball Centre were temporarily closed for remediation works.
