= Dandenong Stadium =

Sports venue in Dandenong, Australia

- Interactive map of Dandenong Stadium
- Former names: Dandenong Indoor Sports Centre; Dandenong Basketball Stadium
- Location: Dandenong, Victoria
- Coordinates: 37°57′51″S 145°13′34″E
- Capacity: Basketball: 2,500

Construction
- Opened: 1992
- General contractor: Britton Timbers - flooring

Tenants
- Volleyball Victoria; Dandenong Basketball Association

Website
- Dandenong Stadium

Dandenong Stadium is an Australian sports and entertainment centre in Dandenong, Victoria. The stadium is home to Volleyball Victoria and Dandenong Basketball Association. The stadium features 10 basketball courts, 7 volleyball courts and 3 beach volleyball courts.

The original Dandenong Stadium floor was laid in 1982.

The stadium was home to the Dandenong Rangers in the Women's National Basketball League (WNBL) as well as the Victoria Giants in the National Basketball League (NBL).
