= List of WNBL awards =

The Women's National Basketball League (WNBL) presents 7 annual awards and honours to recognise its teams, players, and coaches for their accomplishments. In addition, the team award of the WNBL Championship is awarded to the winner of each season's Grand Final.

== Team trophies ==
Award	Created	Description	Most recent winner	Notes
WNBL Championship	1981	Awarded to the winner of the WNBL Finals Series. most titles: Canberra Capitals (9)	Southside Flyers	

== Individual awards ==
Award	Created	Description	Most recent winner(s)	Notes
Most Valuable Player (Suzy Batkovic Medal)	1982	Awarded to the best performing player of the WNBL season.	(Australia) Stephanie Talbot (2020)	
Grand Final Most Valuable Player (Rachael Sporn Medal)	1985	Awarded to the best performing player of the WNBL Grand Final	(Australia) Leilani Mitchell (2020)	
Defensive Player of the Year (Robyn Maher Medal)	1990	Awarded to the best defensive player of the WNBL season.	(Australia) Stephanie Talbot (2020)	
Youth Player of the Year (Betty Watson Medal)	1988	Awarded to the best performing player 23 years of age or under at the completion of the season.	(Australia) Shyla Heal (2020)	
Sixth Woman of the Year	2020	Awarded to the most incredible talent coming off the bench.	(Australia) Zitina Aokuso (2020)	
Coach of the Year	1987	Awarded to the best coach of the WNBL season.	(Australia) Shannon Seebohm (2020)	
Leading Scorer Award	1981	Awarded to the player with the highest average points per game throughout the regular season.	(Australia) Liz Cambage (2020)	
Leading Rebounder Award	2020	Awarded to the player with the highest average rebounds per game throughout the regular season.	(Australia) Anneli Maley (2020)	
Golden Hands Award	2020	Awarded to the player with the highest Golden Hands Rating across the regular season.	(Australia) Leilani Mitchell (2020)	

== Honours ==
Honour	Created	Description	Notes
All-WNBL Team	1988	Awarded to the best five players in the league following every WNBL season. The WNBL All Star Five award is determined by poll of the head coach, assistant coach and team captain of each WNBL team, voters are not permitted to vote for members of their own team. most selections: (Australia) Rachael Sporn (8)	

== See also ==
- List of National Basketball League (Australia) awards
- NBL1 Awards
- List of National Basketball League (New Zealand) awards
