= 1994 WNBL season =

- League: Women's National Basketball League (WNBL)
- Sport: Basketball
- Number of teams: 10
- TV partner(s): ABC; Network Ten

Regular season
- Top seed: Adelaide Lightning
- Season MVP: Shelley Sandie (Sydney Flames)
- Top scorer: Sandy Brondello (Brisbane Blazers); Shelley Sandie (Sydney Flames)

Finals
- Champions: Adelaide Lightning
- Runners-up: Melbourne Tigers
- Finals MVP: Rachael Sporn (Adelaide Lightning)

WNBL seasons
- ← 1993 1995 →

The 1994 WNBL season was the 14th season of competition since its establishment in 1981. A total of 10 teams contested the league.

== Regular season ==
=== Ladder ===
	Team	Played	Won	Lost	Won %
1	Adelaide Lightning	18	16	2	89
2	Melbourne Tigers	18	14	4	78
3	Sydney Flames	18	14	4	78
4	Perth Breakers	18	12	6	67
5	Dandenong Rangers	18	10	8	56
6	Brisbane Blazers	18	8	10	44
7	Canberra Capitals	18	7	11	39
8	Bulleen Boomers	18	5	13	28
9	Australian Institute of Sport	18	4	14	22
10	Hobart Islanders	18	0	18	0

== Finals ==
Semifinals
Adelaide Lightning	84
Melbourne Tigers	82
Sydney Flames	58
Perth Breakers	62

Preliminary final
Melbourne Tigers	74
Perth Breakers	64

Grand final
Adelaide Lightning	84 (OT)
Melbourne Tigers	77

=== Season Awards ===
Award	Winner	Team
Most Valuable Player Award	Shelley Sandie	Sydney Flames
Grand Final MVP Award	Rachael Sporn	Adelaide Lightning
Rookie of the Year Award	Maryanne Difrancesco	Melbourne Tigers
Defensive Player of the Year Award	Robyn Maher	Sydney Flames
Coach of the Year Award	Ray Tomlinson	Melbourne Tigers
Top Shooter Award	Sandy Brondello; Shelley Sandie	Brisbane Blazers; Sydney Flames

=== Statistical leaders ===
Category	Player	Team	GP	Totals	Average
Points Per Game	Sandy Brondello; Shelley Sandie	Brisbane Blazers; Sydney Flames	17; 17	340; 340	20.0; 20.0
Rebounds Per Game	Debbie Slimmon	Bulleen Boomers	18	243	13.5
Assists Per Game	Michele Timms	Perth Breakers	16	94	5.9
Steals Per Game	Robyn Maher	Sydney Flames	17	54	3.2
Blocks per game	Jenny Whittle	Brisbane Blazers	17	49	2.9
Field Goal %	Jo Hill	Adelaide Lightning	18	(92/165)	55.8%
Three-Point Field Goal %	Samantha Tomlinson	Melbourne Tigers	13	(17/36)	47.2%
Free Throw %	Sandy Brondello	Brisbane Blazers	17	(74/84)	88.1%
