= 1997 WNBL season =

- League: Women's National Basketball League (WNBL)
- Sport: Basketball
- Number of teams: 9
- TV partner(s): ABC; Network Ten

Regular season
- Top seed: Sydney Flames
- Season MVP: Rachael Sporn (Adelaide Lightning)
- Top scorer: Rachael Sporn (Adelaide Lightning)

Finals
- Champions: Sydney Flames
- Runners-up: Adelaide Lightning
- Finals MVP: Trisha Fallon (Sydney Flames)

WNBL seasons
- ← 1996 1998 →

The 1997 WNBL season was the 17th season of competition since its establishment in 1981. A total of nine teams contested the league.

== Regular season ==
=== Ladder ===
	Team	Played	Won	Lost	Won %
1	Sydney Flames	18	18	0	100
2	Adelaide Lightning	18	14	4	78
3	Melbourne Tigers	18	12	6	67
4	Dandenong Rangers	18	9	9	50
5	Australian Institute of Sport	16	5	11	31
6	Canberra Capitals	18	6	12	33
7	Brisbane Blazers	18	6	12	33
8	Perth Breakers	18	5	13	28
9	Bulleen Boomers	18	5	13	28

== Finals ==
Elimination final
4	Dandenong Rangers	66
5	AIS	76

Semifinals
1	Sydney Flames	54
Adelaide Lightning	58
Melbourne Tigers	57
AIS	48

Preliminary final
Sydney Flames	57
Melbourne Tigers	54

Grand final
Adelaide Lightning	56
Sydney Flames	61

=== Season awards ===
Award	Winner	Team
Most Valuable Player Award	Rachael Sporn	Adelaide Lightning
Grand Final MVP Award	Trisha Fallon	Sydney Flames
Rookie of the Year Award	Lauren Jackson	AIS
Defensive Player of the Year Award	Tully Bevilaqua	Perth Breakers
Coach of the Year Award	Bill Tomlinson	Sydney Flames
Top Shooter Award	Rachael Sporn	Adelaide Lightning

=== Statistical leaders ===
Category	Player	Team	GP	Totals	Average
Points Per Game	Rachael Sporn	Adelaide Lightning	18	400	22.2
Rebounds Per Game	Rachael Sporn	Adelaide Lightning	18	185	10.3
Assists Per Game	Robyn Maher	Sydney Flames	17	83	4.9
Steals Per Game	Tully Bevilaqua	Perth Breakers	18	55	3.1
Blocks per game	Jenny Whittle	Brisbane Blazers	18	52	2.9
Field Goal %	Rachael Sporn	Adelaide Lightning	18	(176/316)	55.7%
Three-Point Field Goal %	Trisha Fallon	Sydney Flames	18	(19/43)	44.2%
Free Throw %	Allison Cook	Melbourne Tigers	18	(82/91)	90.1%
