= 1995 WNBL season =

- League: Women's National Basketball League (WNBL)
- Sport: Basketball
- Number of teams: 10
- TV partner(s): ABC; Network Ten

Regular season
- Top seed: Adelaide Lightning
- Season MVP: Sandy Brondello (Brisbane Blazers)
- Top scorer: Sandy Brondello (Brisbane Blazers)

Finals
- Champions: Adelaide Lightning
- Runners-up: Melbourne Tigers
- Finals MVP: Rachael Sporn (Adelaide Lightning)

WNBL seasons
- ← 1994 1996 →

The 1995 WNBL season was the 15th season of competition since its establishment in 1981. A total of 10 teams contested the league.

== Regular season ==
=== Ladder ===
	Team	Played	Won	Lost	Won %
1	Adelaide Lightning	18	16	2	89
2	Sydney Flames	18	16	2	89
3	Melbourne Tigers	18	13	5	72
4	Perth Breakers	18	12	6	67
5	Brisbane Blazers	18	10	8	56
6	Canberra Capitals	18	8	10	44
7	Bulleen Boomers	18	6	12	33
8	Dandenong Rangers	18	4	14	22
9	Australian Institute of Sport	18	4	14	22
10	Hobart Islanders	18	1	17	6

== Finals ==
Semifinals
Adelaide Lightning	73
Sydney Flames	63
Melbourne Tigers	60
Perth Breakers	39

Preliminary final
Sydney Flames	56
Melbourne Tigers	69

Grand final
Adelaide Lightning	50
Melbourne Tigers	43

=== Season Awards ===
Award	Winner	Team
Most Valuable Player Award	Sandy Brondello	Brisbane Blazers
Grand Final MVP Award	Rachael Sporn	Adelaide Lightning
Rookie of the Year Award	Chika Emeagi	AIS
Defensive Player of the Year Award	Tully Bevilaqua	Perth Breakers
Coach of the Year Award	Guy Molloy	Perth Breakers
Top Shooter Award	Sandy Brondello	Brisbane Blazers

=== Statistical leaders ===
Category	Player	Team	GP	Totals	Average
Points Per Game	Sandy Brondello	Brisbane Blazers	18	357	19.8
Rebounds Per Game	Debbie Slimmon	Bulleen Boomers	18	226	12.6
Assists Per Game	Michele Timms	Sydney Flames	18	95	5.3
Steals Per Game	Michele Timms	Sydney Flames	18	59	3.3
Blocks per game	Jenny Whittle	Brisbane Blazers	18	50	2.8
Field Goal %	Trisha Fallon	Sydney Flames	15	(92/168)	54.8%
Three-Point Field Goal %	Gina Stevens	Perth Breakers	17	(15/34)	44.1%
Free Throw %	Sandy Brondello	Brisbane Blazers	18	(82/93)	88.2%
