= 1998 WNBL season =

- League: Women's National Basketball League (WNBL)
- Sport: Basketball
- Number of teams: 9
- TV partner(s): ABC

Regular season
- Top seed: Sydney Flames
- Season MVP: Michelle Griffiths (Sydney Flames)
- Top scorer: Allison Cook (Bulleen Boomers)

Finals
- Champions: Adelaide Lightning
- Runners-up: Sydney Flames
- Finals MVP: Jo Hill (Adelaide Lightning)

WNBL seasons
- ← 1997 1998–99 →

The 1998 WNBL season was the 18th season of competition since its establishment in 1981. A total of 9 teams contested the league.

== Regular season ==
=== Ladder ===
	Team	Played	Won	Lost	Won %
1	Sydney Flames	12	10	2	83
2	Adelaide Lightning	12	9	3	75
3	Perth Breakers	12	8	4	67
4	Australian Institute of Sport	12	8	4	67
5	Melbourne Tigers	12	7	5	58
6	Dandenong Rangers	12	7	5	58
7	Bulleen Boomers	12	3	9	25
8	Canberra Capitals	12	2	10	17
9	Brisbane Blazers	12	0	12	0

== Finals ==
Semifinals
Sydney Flames	61
Adelaide Lightning	42
Perth Breakers	70
AIS	84

Preliminary final
Adelaide Lightning	81
AIS	54

Grand final
Sydney Flames	56
Adelaide Lightning	67

=== Season Awards ===
Award	Winner	Team
Most Valuable Player Award	Michelle Griffiths	Sydney Flames
Grand Final MVP Award	Jo Hill	Adelaide Lightning
Rookie of the Year Award	Andrea Cartledge	Melbourne Tigers
Defensive Player of the Year Award	Emily McInerny	Melbourne Tigers
Coach of the Year Award	Phil Brown	AIS
Top Shooter Award	Allison Cook	Bulleen Boomers

=== Statistical leaders ===
Category	Player	Team	GP	Totals	Average
Points Per Game	Allison Cook	Bulleen Boomers	12	232	19.3
Rebounds Per Game	Lucille Hamilton	Dandenong Rangers	12	135	11.3
Assists Per Game	Robyn Maher	Sydney Flames	11	62	5.6
Steals Per Game	Tully Bevilaqua	Perth Breakers	9	37	4.1
Blocks per game	Jenny Whittle	Perth Breakers	12	40	3.3
Field Goal %	Kelly Lemezs	Melbourne Tigers	12	(45/73)	61.6%
Three-Point Field Goal %	Kim Wielens	Canberra Capitals	12	(18/36)	50.0%
Free Throw %	Allison Cook	Bulleen Boomers	12	(44/50)	88.0%
