= 1996 WNBL season =

- League: Women's National Basketball League (WNBL)
- Sport: Basketball
- Number of teams: 10
- TV partner(s): ABC; Network Ten

Regular season
- Top seed: Sydney Flames
- Season MVP: Rachael Sporn (Adelaide Lightning)
- Top scorer: Gina Stevens (Perth Breakers)

Finals
- Champions: Adelaide Lightning
- Runners-up: Sydney Flames
- Finals MVP: Michelle Griffiths (Adelaide Lightning)

WNBL seasons
- ← 1995 1997 →

The 1996 WNBL season was the 16th season of competition since its establishment in 1981. A total of 10 teams contested the league.

== Regular season ==
=== Ladder ===
	Team	Played	Won	Lost	Won %
1	Sydney Flames	18	17	1	94
2	Adelaide Lightning	18	16	2	89
3	Bulleen Boomers	18	14	4	78
4	Perth Breakers	18	11	7	61
5	Brisbane Blazers	18	9	9	50
6	Dandenong Rangers	18	9	9	50
7	Melbourne Tigers	18	6	12	33
8	Canberra Capitals	18	5	13	28
9	Hobart Islanders	18	2	16	11
10	Australian Institute of Sport	18	1	17	6

== Finals ==
Elimination final
4	Perth Breakers	95
5	Brisbane Blazers	62

Semifinals
1	Sydney Flames	57
Adelaide Lightning	54
Bulleen Boomers	58
Perth Breakers	75

Preliminary final
Adelaide Lightning	87
Perth Breakers	55

Grand final
Sydney Flames	65
Adelaide Lightning	80

=== Season Awards ===
Award	Winner	Team
Most Valuable Player Award	Rachael Sporn	Adelaide Lightning
Grand Final MVP Award	Michelle Griffiths	Adelaide Lightning
Rookie of the Year Award	Jessica Bibby	Dandenong Rangers
Defensive Player of the Year Award	Tully Bevilaqua	Perth Breakers
Coach of the Year Award	Lori Chizik	Bulleen Boomers
Top Shooter Award	Gina Stevens	Perth Breakers

=== Statistical leaders ===
Category	Player	Team	GP	Totals	Average
Points Per Game	Gina Stevens	Perth Breakers	18	375	20.8
Rebounds Per Game	Jenny Whittle	Brisbane Blazers	17	189	11.1
Assists Per Game	Debbie Black	Hobart Islanders	17	83	4.9
Steals Per Game	Debbie Black	Hobart Islanders	17	86	5.1
Blocks per game	Jenny Whittle	Brisbane Blazers	17	70	4.1
Field Goal %	Sally Barney	Brisbane Blazers	13	(26/42)	61.9%
Three-Point Field Goal %	Michele Timms	Sydney Flames	15	(48/99)	48.5%
Free Throw %	Allison Cook	Dandenong Rangers	18	(68/74)	91.9%
