= 1991 WNBL season =

- League: Women's National Basketball League (WNBL)
- Sport: Basketball
- Number of teams: 12
- TV partner(s): ABC

Regular season
- Top seed: Hobart Islanders
- Season MVP: Joanne Metcalfe (Melbourne Tigers)
- Top scorer: Joanne Metcalfe (Melbourne Tigers)

Finals
- Champions: Hobart Islanders
- Runners-up: Nunawading Spectres
- Finals MVP: Robyn Maher (Hobart Islanders)

WNBL seasons
- ← 1990 1992 →

The 1991 WNBL season was the 11th season of competition since the league's establishment in 1981. A total of 12 teams contested the league.

== Regular season ==
=== Ladder ===
	Team	Played	Won	Lost	Won %
1	Hobart Islanders	22	18	4	82
2	Nunawading Spectres	22	18	4	82
3	Perth Breakers	22	15	7	68
4	North Adelaide Rockets	22	13	9	59
5	Canberra Capitals	22	12	10	55
6	Bulleen Boomers	22	11	11	50
7	Melbourne Tigers	22	11	11	50
8	Australian Institute of Sport	22	10	12	45
9	Sydney Flames	22	10	12	45
10	Brisbane Lady Bullets	22	9	13	41
11	Noarlunga Tigers	22	5	17	23
12	West Adelaide Bearcats	22	0	22	0

== Finals ==
Semifinals
Hobart Islanders	73
Nunawading Spectres	78
Perth Breakers	82
North Adelaide Rockets	72

Preliminary final
Hobart Islanders	74
Perth Breakers	61

Grand final
Nunawading Spectres	64
Hobart Islanders	67

=== Season Awards ===
Award	Winner	Team
Most Valuable Player Award	Joanne Metcalfe	Melbourne Tigers
Grand Final MVP Award	Robyn Maher	Hobart Islanders
Rookie of the Year Award	Michelle Brogan	Noarlunga Tigers
Defensive Player of the Year Award	Kim Foley	Hobart Islanders
Coach of the Year Award	Jerry Lee	Canberra Capitals
Top Shooter Award	Joanne Metcalfe	Melbourne Tigers

=== Statistical leaders ===
Category	Player	Team	GP	Totals	Average
Points Per Game	Joanne Metcalfe	Melbourne Tigers	22	479	21.8
Rebounds Per Game	Debbie Slimmon	Bulleen Boomers	22	279	12.7
Assists Per Game	Michele Landon	Sydney Flames	22	158	7.2
Steals Per Game	Michele Timms	Perth Breakers	22	79	3.6
Blocks per game	Jenny Whittle	AIS	22	57	2.6
Field Goal %	Lucille Hamilton	Nunawading Spectres	22	(117/201)	58.2%
Three-Point Field Goal %	Debbie Black	Hobart Islanders	22	(21/49)	42.9%
Free Throw %	Sally Phillips	AIS	22	(52/57)	91.2%
