= 1993 WNBL season =

- League: Women's National Basketball League (WNBL)
- Sport: Basketball
- Number of teams: 10
- TV partner(s): ABC; Network Ten

Regular season
- Top seed: Sydney Flames
- Season MVP: Allison Cook (Melbourne Tigers)
- Top scorer: Samantha Thornton (Dandenong Rangers)

Finals
- Champions: Sydney Flames
- Runners-up: Perth Breakers
- Finals MVP: Annie Burgess (Sydney Flames)

WNBL seasons
- ← 1992 1994 →

The 1993 WNBL season was the 13th season of competition since its establishment in 1981. A total of 10 teams contested the league.

== Regular season ==
=== Ladder ===
	Team	Played	Won	Lost	Won %
1	Sydney Flames	18	17	1	94
2	Adelaide Lightning	18	16	2	89
3	Perth Breakers	18	12	6	67
4	Dandenong Rangers	18	10	8	56
5	Melbourne Tigers	18	9	9	50
6	Australian Institute of Sport	18	8	10	44
7	Bulleen Boomers	18	7	11	39
8	Canberra Capitals	18	7	11	39
9	Brisbane Blazers	18	2	16	11
10	Hobart Islanders	18	2	16	11

== Finals ==
Semifinals
Sydney Flames	64 (OT)
Adelaide Lightning	59
Perth Breakers	83
Dandenong Rangers	68

Preliminary final
Adelaide Lightning	66
Perth Breakers	68 (OT)

Grand final
Sydney Flames	65
Perth Breakers	64

=== Season Awards ===
Award	Winner	Team
Most Valuable Player Award	Allison Cook	Melbourne Tigers
Grand Final MVP Award	Annie Burgess	Sydney Flames
Rookie of the Year Award	Allison Cook	Melbourne Tigers
Defensive Player of the Year Award	Karen Dalton	Sydney Flames
Coach of the Year Award	Jan Stirling	Adelaide Lightning
Top Shooter Award	Samantha Thornton	Dandenong Rangers

=== Statistical leaders ===
Category	Player	Team	GP	Totals	Average
Points Per Game	Samantha Thornton	Dandenong Rangers	18	337	18.7
Rebounds Per Game	Debbie Slimmon	Bulleen Boomers	16	209	13.1
Assists Per Game	Michele Landon	Sydney Flames	18	142	7.9
Steals Per Game	Debbie Black	Hobart Islanders	18	63	3.5
Blocks per game	Diana Sadovnikova	Canberra Capitals	14	36	2.6
Field Goal %	Regina Days	Dandenong Rangers	18	(104/185)	56.2%
Three-Point Field Goal %	Michele Gubbels	Dandenong Rangers	18	(16/34)	47.1%
Free Throw %	Kerryn Henderson	Melbourne Tigers	18	(34/37)	91.9%
