= 1990 WNBL season =

- League: Women's National Basketball League (WNBL)
- Sport: Basketball
- Number of teams: 13
- TV partner(s): ABC

Regular season
- Top seed: North Adelaide Rockets
- Season MVP: Debbie Slimmon (Bulleen Boomers)
- Top scorer: Debbie Slimmon (Bulleen Boomers)

Finals
- Champions: North Adelaide Rockets
- Runners-up: Hobart Islanders
- Finals MVP: Donna Brown (North Adelaide Rockets)

WNBL seasons
- ← 1989 1991 →

The 1990 WNBL season was the tenth season of competition since its establishment in 1981. A total of 13 teams contested the league.

== Regular season ==
=== Ladder ===
| | Team | Played | Won | Lost | Won % |
| 1 | North Adelaide Rockets | 24 | 22 | 2 | 92 |
| 2 | Hobart Islanders | 24 | 19 | 5 | 79 |
| 3 | Bulleen Boomers | 24 | 17 | 7 | 71 |
| 4 | Nunawading Spectres | 24 | 17 | 7 | 71 |
| 5 | Melbourne Tigers | 24 | 17 | 7 | 71 |
| 6 | Australian Institute of Sport | 24 | 16 | 8 | 67 |
| 7 | Sydney Bruins | 24 | 13 | 11 | 54 |
| 8 | Perth Breakers | 24 | 10 | 14 | 42 |
| 9 | Brisbane Lady Bullets | 24 | 9 | 15 | 38 |
| 10 | West Adelaide Bearcats | 24 | 6 | 18 | 25 |
| 11 | Canberra Capitals | 24 | 5 | 19 | 21 |
| 12 | Coburg Cougars | 24 | 3 | 21 | 12 |
| 13 | Noarlunga Tigers | 24 | 2 | 22 | 8 |

== Finals ==
Semifinals
North Adelaide Rockets | 65
Hobart Islanders | 68
Bulleen Boomers | 69
Nunawading Spectres | 89

Preliminary final
North Adelaide Rockets | 79
Nunawading Spectres | 70

Grand final
Hobart Islanders | 57
North Adelaide Rockets | 72

=== Season Awards ===
| Award | Winner | Team |
|---|---|---|
| Most Valuable Player Award | Debbie Slimmon | Bulleen Boomers |
| Grand Final MVP Award | Donna Brown | North Adelaide Rockets |
| Rookie of the Year Award | Trisha Fallon | AIS |
| Defensive Player of the Year Award | Karen Dalton | Sydney Bruins |
| Coach of the Year Award | Jenny Cheesman | AIS |
| Top Shooter Award | Debbie Slimmon | Bulleen Boomers |

=== Statistical leaders ===
| Category | Player | Team | GP | Totals | Average |
|---|---|---|---|---|---|
| Points Per Game | Debbie Slimmon | Bulleen Boomers | 24 | 535 | 22.3 |
| Rebounds Per Game | Debbie Slimmon | Bulleen Boomers | 24 | 328 | 13.7 |
| Assists Per Game | Michele Landon | Sydney Bruins | 24 | 175 | 7.3 |
| Steals Per Game | Michele Timms | Nunawading Spectres | 20 | 68 | 3.4 |
| Blocks per game | Sarah Sullivan | Coburg Cougars | 20 | 50 | 2.5 |
| Field Goal % | Rachael Sporn | North Adelaide Rockets | 20 | (119/198) | 60.1% |
| Three-Point Field Goal % | Vicki Daldy | North Adelaide Rockets | 24 | (19/43) | 44.2% |
| Free Throw % | Sandy Brondello | Sydney Bruins | 21 | (31/34) | 91.2% |
