= 1988 WNBL season =

- League: Women's National Basketball League (WNBL)
- Sport: Basketball
- Number of teams: 12
- TV partner(s): ABC

Regular season
- Top seed: Nunawading Spectres
- Season MVP: Julie Nykiel (Noarlunga Tigers)
- Top scorer: Julie Nykiel (Noarlunga Tigers)

Finals
- Champions: Nunawading Spectres
- Runners-up: North Adelaide Rockets
- Finals MVP: Shelley Gorman (Nunawading Spectres)

WNBL seasons
- ← 1987 1989 →

The 1988 WNBL season was the eighth season of competition since its establishment in 1981. A total of 12 teams contested the league.

== Regular season ==
=== Ladder ===
	Team	Played	Won	Lost	Won %
1	Nunawading Spectres	22	21	1	95
2	North Adelaide Rockets	22	18	4	82
3	Bankstown Bruins	22	16	6	73
4	West Adelaide Bearcats	22	14	8	64
5	Canberra Capitals	22	13	9	59
6	Coburg Cougars	22	13	9	59
7	Noarlunga Tigers	22	12	10	55
8	Brisbane Lady Bullets	22	11	11	50
9	Perth Breakers	22	6	16	27
10	Bulleen Melbourne Boomers	22	5	17	23
11	Australian Institute of Sport	22	3	19	14
12	Hobart Islanders	22	0	22	0

== Finals ==
Semi-finals
1	Nunawading Spectres	81
4	West Adelaide Bearcats	63
3	Bankstown Bruins	56
2	North Adelaide Rockets	73

Grand Final
1	Nunawading Spectres	71
2	North Adelaide Rockets	43

=== Season Awards ===
Award	Winner	Team
Most Valuable Player Award	Julie Nykiel	Noarlunga Tigers
Grand Final MVP Award	Shelley Gorman	Nunawading Spectres
Rookie of the Year Award	Lucille Hamilton	Australian Institute of Sport
Coach of the Year Award	Robbie Cadee	Bankstown Bruins
Top Shooter Award	Julie Nykiel	Noarlunga Tigers

=== Statistical leaders ===
Category	Player	Team	GP	Totals	Average
Points Per Game	Julie Nykiel	Noarlunga Tigers	21	452	21.5
Rebounds Per Game	Debbie Slimmon	Coburg Cougars	19	245	12.9
Assists Per Game	Karin Maar	Coburg Cougars	22	112	5.1
Steals Per Game	Donna Brown	North Adelaide Rockets	21	75	3.6
Blocks per game	Roksana Boreli	Hobart Islanders	6	13	2.2
Field Goal %	Julie Nykiel	Noarlunga Tigers	21	(180/312)	57.7%
Three-Point Field Goal %	Michele Timms	Nunawading Spectres	21	(44/85)	51.8%
Free Throw %	Laura Giaretto	North Adelaide Rockets	19	(42/48)	87.5%
