= 1987 WNBL season =

- League: Women's National Basketball League (WNBL)
- Sport: Basketball
- Number of teams: 11
- TV partner(s): ABC

Regular season
- Top seed: Nunawading Spectres
- Season MVP: Robyn Maher (Nunawading Spectres)
- Top scorer: Kathy Foster (Hobart Islanders)

Finals
- Champions: Nunawading Spectres
- Runners-up: Coburg Cougars
- Finals MVP: Tracey Browning (Nunawading Spectres)

WNBL seasons
- ← 1986 1988 →

The 1987 WNBL season was the seventh season of competition since its establishment in 1981. A total of 11 teams contested the league.

== Regular season ==
=== Ladder ===
	Team	Played	Won	Lost	Won %
1	Nunawading Spectres	20	18	2	90
2	Coburg Cougars	20	14	6	70
3	North Adelaide Rockets	20	13	7	65
4	West Adelaide Bearcats	20	13	7	65
5	Australian Institute of Sport	20	10	10	50
6	Brisbane Lady Bullets	20	10	10	50
7	Noarlunga Tigers	20	10	10	50
8	Bankstown Bruins	20	8	12	40
9	Canberra Capitals	20	7	13	35
10	Hobart Islanders	20	4	16	20
11	Bulleen Melbourne Boomers	20	3	17	15

== Finals ==
Semi-finals
1	Nunawading Spectres	61
4	West Adelaide Bearcats	52
3	North Adelaide Rockets	60
2	Coburg Cougars	67

Grand Final
1	Nunawading Spectres	67
2	Coburg Cougars	59

=== Season Awards ===
Award	Winner	Team
Most Valuable Player Award	Robyn Maher	Nunawading Spectres
Grand Final MVP Award	Tracey Browning	Nunawading Spectres
Coach of the Year Award	Tom Maher	Nunawading Spectres
Top Shooter Award	Kathy Foster	Hobart Islanders

=== Statistical leaders ===
Category	Player	Team	GP	Totals	Average
Points Per Game	Kathy Foster	Hobart Islanders	20	415	20.8
Rebounds Per Game	Samantha Thornton	Bulleen Melbourne Boomers	18	221	12.3
Assists Per Game	Karin Maar	Coburg Cougars	20	104	5.2
Steals Per Game	Donna Brown	Noarlunga Tigers	20	66	3.3
Blocks per game	Chris Saunders	Bulleen Melbourne Boomers	20	24	1.2
Field Goal %	Marisa Rowe	Coburg Cougars	17	(69/129)	53.5%
Three-Point Field Goal %	Cheryl Chambers	Coburg Cougars	19	(18/42)	42.9%
Free Throw %	Sandy Brondello	Australian Institute of Sport	18	(34/43)	79.1%
