= 1989 WNBL season =

- League: Women's National Basketball League (WNBL)
- Sport: Basketball
- Number of teams: 12 (13)
- TV partner(s): ABC

Regular season
- Top seed: Nunawading Spectres
- Season MVP: Kathy Foster (Hobart Islanders)
- Top scorer: Kathy Foster (Hobart Islanders)

Finals
- Champions: Nunawading Spectres
- Runners-up: Hobart Islanders
- Finals MVP: Samantha Thornton (Nunawading Spectres)

WNBL seasons
- ← 1988 1990 →

The 1989 WNBL season was the ninth season of competition since its establishment in 1981. A total of 13 teams contested the league to start the season, but the Perth Breakers withdrew midseason.

== Regular season ==
=== Ladder ===
	Team	Played	Won	Lost	Won %
1	Nunawading Spectres	24	20	4	83
2	Hobart Islanders	23	16	7	70
3	North Adelaide Rockets	23	18	5	78
4	Bulleen Boomers	24	16	8	67
5	Sydney Bruins	22	14	8	64
6	Brisbane Lady Bullets	21	11	10	52
7	West Adelaide Bearcats	24	13	11	54
8	Melbourne Tigers	23	10	13	43
9	Canberra Capitals	23	8	15	35
10	Coburg Cougars	24	6	18	25
11	Noarlunga Tigers	22	3	19	14
12	Australian Institute of Sport	24	3	21	12

The Perth Breakers had a 9–8 record at the time they withdrew from the season due to the pilot strike.

== Finals ==
Semi-finals
1	Nunawading Spectres	69
4	Bulleen Boomers	68
2	Hobart Islanders	69
3	North Adelaide Rockets	53

Grand Final
1	Nunawading Spectres	80
2	Hobart Islanders	69

=== Season Awards ===
Award	Winner	Team
Most Valuable Player Award	Kathy Foster	Hobart Islanders
Grand Final MVP Award	Samantha Thornton	Nunawading Spectres
Rookie of the Year Award	Renae Fegent	AIS
Coach of the Year Award	Mark Molitor	North Adelaide Rockets
Top Shooter Award	Kathy Foster	Hobart Islanders

=== Statistical leaders ===
Category	Player	Team	GP	Totals	Average
Points Per Game	Kathy Foster	Hobart Islanders	23	467	20.3
Rebounds Per Game	Rachael Sporn	West Adelaide Bearcats	22	314	14.3
Assists Per Game	Karin Maar	Bulleen Boomers	24	134	5.6
Steals Per Game	Kathy Hahn	Noarlunga Tigers	22	70	3.2
Blocks per game	Sarah Duncan	Coburg Cougars	15	30	2.0
Field Goal %	Trina Roberts	Brisbane Lady Bullets	21	(147/237)	62.0%
Three-Point Field Goal %	Cherie Hogg	Canberra Capitals	23	(22/51)	43.1%
Free Throw %	Patricia Mickan	North Adelaide Rockets	23	(38/43)	88.4%
