= 1986 WNBL season =

- League: Women's National Basketball League (WNBL)
- Sport: Basketball
- Number of teams: 13
- TV partner(s): ABC

Regular season
- Top seed: Nunawading Spectres
- Season MVP: Kathy Foster (Hobart Islanders)
- Top scorer: Karin Maar (Coburg Cougars)

Finals
- Champions: Nunawading Spectres
- Runners-up: Australian Institute of Sport
- Finals MVP: Shelley Gorman (Nunawading Spectres)

WNBL seasons
- ← 1985 1987 →

The 1986 season of the Australian Women's National Basketball League (WNBL) was the sixth season of competition since its establishment in 1981. A total of 13 teams contested the league, and Nunawading Spectres emerged as champions.

== Ladder ==
	Team	Played	Won	Lost	Won %
1	Nunawading Spectres	24	20	4	83
2	Brisbane Lady Bullets	24	18	6	75
3	Australian Institute of Sport	24	18	6	75
4	Coburg Cougars	24	17	7	71
5	North Adelaide Rockets	24	16	8	67
6	Canberra Capitals	24	16	8	67
7	West Adelaide Bearcats	24	14	10	58
8	Noarlunga Tigers	24	11	13	46
9	Bankstown Bruins	24	8	16	33
10	Hobart Islanders	24	8	16	33
11	Geelong Cats	24	5	19	21
12	Bulleen Melbourne Boomers	24	5	19	21
13	Sutherland Sharks	24	0	24	0

== Finals ==
Semi-finals
1	Nunawading Spectres	65
4	Coburg Cougars	57
3	Australian Institute of Sport	64
2	Brisbane Lady Bullets	61

Grand Final
1	Nunawading Spectres	62
3	Australian Institute of Sport	51

=== Season Awards ===
Award	Winner	Team
Most Valuable Player Award	Kathy Foster	Hobart Islanders
Grand Final MVP Award	Shelley Gorman	Nunawading Spectres
Top Shooter Award	Karin Maar	Coburg Cougars
