= Guy Molloy =

Australian basketball coach (born 1965)

Jilin Northeast Tigers
- Position: Assistant coach
- League: CBA

Personal information
- Born: 4 November 1965 (age 61) Young, New South Wales, Australia

Career history

Coaching
- 1989: Canberra Capitals
- 1991–1992: Canberra Cannons (assistant)
- 1991–1992: Canberra Gunners
- 1993–1996: Perth Breakers
- 1997–1998: South East Melbourne Magic (assistant)
- 1998–2000: Victoria Titans (assistant)
- 2001–2005: Cairns Taipans
- 2006–2009: South Dragons (assistant)
- 2013–2022: Melbourne Boomers
- 2022: Wellington Saints
- 2023–2024: Southland Sharks
- 2023–2025: Sydney Flames
- 2026–present: Jilin Northeast Tigers (assistant)

Career highlights
- WNBL champion (2022); NBL champion (2009); 2× WNBL Coach of the Year (1995, 2014)
Medals
Basketball coach
Representing Australia
FIBA Under-17 World Championship
Silver medal – second place	2012 Lithuania
Representing New Zealand
Commonwealth Games
Bronze medal – third place	2018 Gold Coast

Guy Edward Molloy (born 4 November 1965) is an Australian basketball coach who is currently an assistant coach for the Jilin Northeast Tigers of the Chinese Basketball Association.

== Early life ==
Molloy was born in Young, New South Wales. He moved to Canberra to study one of the first sports science degrees, with a major in coaching, at the University of Canberra in 1984. He became ACT Basketball's development officer and later the ACT director of coaching. He also spent a year as a coach with the ACT Academy of Sport.

== Coaching career ==
=== WNBL ===
Molloy began his coaching career as head coach of the Canberra Capitals in the 1989 WNBL season.

Between 1993 and 1996, Molloy served as head coach of the Perth Breakers. The Breakers reached the finals in all four of Molloy's seasons, including reaching the 1993 WNBL Grand Final. In 1995, Molloy was named the WNBL Coach of the Year.

In 2013, Molloy returned to the WNBL, as head coach of the newly branded Melbourne Boomers. In his first season back, after leading the Boomers to the semi-finals, he was named the WNBL Coach of the Year for the second time. He parted ways with the Boomers at the end of the 2021–22 WNBL season after leading them to the championship.

In April 2023, Molloy was appointed head coach of the Sydney Flames. He guided the team to 11 wins and 10 losses in the 2023–24 WNBL season. He returned to the Flames for the 2024–25 WNBL season. In February 2025, he coached his 350th WNBL game.

On 29 November 2025, Molloy stepped down as head coach of the Sydney Flames and moved into an advisory role with the club for the rest of the 2025–26 WNBL season.

=== NBL ===
In 1991 and 1992, Molloy served as assistant coach of the Canberra Cannons in the NBL. At the same time, he served as head coach of the Canberra Gunners in the South East Australian Basketball League.

Following his time with the Perth Breakers, Molloy moved to Melbourne and assisted Brian Goorjian at the South East Melbourne Magic. After two seasons with the Magic, he served as assistant with the Victoria Titans between 1998 and 2000.

Molloy was appointed head coach of the Cairns Taipans in 2001. He left the Taipans in 2005 after four seasons. Between 2006 and 2009, he served as an assistant coach with the South Dragons. He was a member of their championship-winning team in 2009.

=== NZNBL ===
In November 2021, Molloy was appointed head coach of the Wellington Saints for the 2022 New Zealand NBL season. As defending champions and the most successful club in NZNBL history with 12 titles, the Saints went 3–7 over the first ten games to be in danger of missing the top six finals for the first time since 2007. As a result, Molloy was sacked on 21 June 2022.

In December 2022, Molloy was appointed head coach of the Southland Sharks for the 2023 New Zealand NBL season. He re-signed with the Sharks for two more seasons on 7 September 2023. He parted ways with the Sharks in October 2024.

=== CBA ===
On 25 May 2026, Molloy was named as the first assistant coach of CBA team Jilin Northeast Tigers.

=== National teams ===
Molloy served as an assistant coach with the Australian Opals from 1989 to 1994. During this time, he was on board during both the 1990 and 1994 FIBA World Championship tournaments.

In 2009, Molloy was appointed head coach of the Australia U-17 men's team, leading into the inaugural FIBA Under-17 World Championship in 2010. Following Australia's sixth-place finish in 2010, Molloy was reappointed leading into the next tournament in 2012. Here, Molloy coached a Dante Exum-led team to a silver medal.

In 2017, Molloy was appointed as assistant coach to Kennedy Kereama with the New Zealand Tall Ferns, leading into the 2017 FIBA Asia Women's Cup. In 2018, he was promoted to head coach of the Tall Ferns. He led the Tall Ferns to the bronze medal at the 2018 Commonwealth Games. He parted ways with the Tall Ferns in March 2024 after six years as head coach.

== Coaching record ==
Legend
Regular season	G	Games coached	W	Games won	L	Games lost	W–L %	Win–loss %
Playoffs	PG	Playoff games	PW	Playoff wins	PL	Playoff losses	PW–L %	Playoff win–loss %

=== WNBL ===
Team	Year	G	W	L	W–L%	Finish	PG	PW	PL	PW–L%	Result
Canberra	1989	23	8	15	.348	9th of 12	–	–	–	–	
Perth	1993	18	12	6	.667	3rd of 10	3	2	1	.667	Lost Grand Final
Perth	1994	18	12	6	.667	4th of 10	2	1	1	.500	Lost Preliminary Final
Perth	1995	18	12	6	.667	4th of 10	1	0	1	.000	Lost Semi Finals
Perth	1996	18	11	7	.611	4th of 10	3	2	1	.667	Lost Preliminary Final
Melbourne	2013–14	24	14	10	.583	4th of 9	1	0	1	.000	Lost Semi Finals
Melbourne	2014–15	22	11	11	.500	6th of 8	–	–	–	–	
Melbourne	2015–16	24	8	16	.333	8th of 9	–	–	–	–	
Melbourne	2016–17	24	5	19	.208	7th of 8	–	–	–	–	
Melbourne	2017–18	21	12	9	.571	4th of 8	5	3	2	.600	Lost Grand Final
Melbourne	2018–19	21	15	6	.714	2nd of 8	2	0	2	.000	Lost Semi Finals
Melbourne	2019–20	21	15	6	.714	3rd of 8	3	1	2	.333	Lost Semi Finals
Melbourne	2020	13	9	4	.692	4th of 8	2	1	1	.500	Lost Preliminary Final
Career		265	144	121	.543		22	10	12	.455	
