= WNBL Most Valuable Player Award =

Annual award in Australian basketball

The Women's National Basketball League Most Valuable Player (MVP) is an annual Women's National Basketball League (WNBL) award given since the league's second season. MVP voting takes place throughout the regular season and is determined by a players' accumulated score from game-by-game voting. In every game, each head coach and the referees from each respective game complete a voting card, with three points being awarded for a first place vote, two for second, one for third, a player can take a maximum of nine votes from any one game. It is the most prestigious award for individual players in the WNBL.

Suzy Batkovic is the most decorated player in WNBL history, winning the prestigious award a record six times. Due to this, from 2019 onwards the award will be known as the Suzy Batkovic Most Valuable Player Award (known as the Suzy Batkovic Medal). Highly regarded as one of the greatest of all time, Lauren Jackson also won the award four times, and solely held the record until 2016.

== Winners ==
	Denotes player whose team won the Championship that year
	Denotes player inducted into the Australian Basketball Hall of Fame
	Denotes player who is still active
Player (X)	Denotes the number of times the player had been named MVP at that time
Team (X)	Denotes the number of times a player from this team had won at that time

Season	Player	Position	Nationality	Team	Ref
1982	Karen Ogden		Australia	St Kilda Saints	
1983	Karen Ogden (2)		Australia	St Kilda Saints (2)	
1983	Robyn Maher		Australia	Nunawading Spectres	
1984	Julie Nykiel		Australia	Noarlunga Tigers	
1985	Kathy Foster		Australia	North Adelaide Rockets	
1986	Kathy Foster (2)		Australia	Hobart Islanders	
1987	Robyn Maher (2)		Australia	Nunawading Spectres (2)	
1988	Julie Nykiel (2)		Australia	Noarlunga Tigers (2)	
1989	Kathy Foster (3)		Australia	Hobart Islanders (2)	
1990	Debbie Slimmon		Australia	Bulleen Melbourne Boomers	
1991	Joanne Metcalfe		Australia	Melbourne Tigers	
1992	Debbie Slimmon (2)		Australia	Bulleen Melbourne Boomers (2)	
1993	Allison Cook	Guard	Australia	Melbourne Tigers (2)	
1994	Shelley Gorman	Guard	Australia	Sydney Flames	
1995	Sandy Brondello	Guard	Australia	Brisbane Blazers	
1996	Rachael Sporn	Forward	Australia	Adelaide Lightning	
1997	Rachael Sporn (2)	Forward	Australia	Adelaide Lightning (2)	
1998	Michelle Griffiths	Forward	Australia	Sydney Flames (2)	
1998–99	Lauren Jackson	Forward/center	Australia	Australian Institute of Sport	
1999–00	Lauren Jackson (2)	Forward/center	Australia	Canberra Capitals	
1999–00	Trisha Fallon	Guard/forward	Australia	Sydney Flames (3)	
2000–01	Penny Taylor	Forward	Australia	Dandenong Rangers	
2001–02	Penny Taylor (2)	Forward	Australia	Dandenong Rangers (2)	
2002–03	Lauren Jackson (3)	Forward/center	Australia	Canberra Capitals (2)	
2003–04	Lauren Jackson (4)	Forward/center	Australia	Canberra Capitals (3)	
2004–05	Katrina Hibbert	Guard/forward	Australia	Bulleen Melbourne Boomers (3)	
2005–06	Katrina Hibbert (2)	Guard/forward	Australia	Bulleen Melbourne Boomers (4)	
2006–07	Hollie Grima	Center/forward	Australia	Bulleen Melbourne Boomers (5)	
2007–08	Natalie Porter	Forward	Australia	Sydney Uni Flames (4)	
2008–09	Rohanee Cox	Guard/forward	Australia	Townsville Fire	
2009–10	Kristi Harrower	Guard	Australia	Bendigo Spirit	
2010–11	Liz Cambage	Center	Australia	Bulleen Boomers (6)	
2011–12	Suzy Batkovic	Center	Australia	Adelaide Lightning (3)	
2012–13	Suzy Batkovic (2)	Center	Australia	Adelaide Lightning (4)	
2013–14	Suzy Batkovic (3)	Center	Australia	Townsville Fire (2)	
2014–15	Abby Bishop	Forward/center	Australia	Canberra Capitals (4)	
2015–16	Suzy Batkovic (4)	Center	Australia	Townsville Fire (3)	
2016–17	Suzy Batkovic (5)	Center	Australia	Townsville Fire (4)	
2017–18	Suzy Batkovic (6)	Center	Australia	Townsville Fire (5)	
2018–19	Kelsey Griffin	Forward	Australia	Canberra Capitals (5)	
2019–20	Kia Nurse	Guard	Canada	Canberra Capitals (6)	
2020	Stephanie Talbot	Guard/forward	Australia	Adelaide Lightning (5)	
2021–22	Anneli Maley	Forward	Australia	Bendigo Spirit (2)	
2022–23	Cayla George	Forward/center	Australia	Melbourne Boomers (7)	
2023–24	Jordin Canada	Guard	United States	Melbourne Boomers (8)	
2024–25	Sami Whitcomb	Guard	Australia	Bendigo Spirit (3)	
2025–26	Isobel Borlase	Guard	Australia	Bendigo Spirit (4)	

== Multi-time winners ==
Rank	Player	Team(s)	Awards	Years
1	Suzy Batkovic	Adelaide Lightning (2) / Townsville Fire (4)	6	2012, 2013, 2014, 2016, 2017, 2018
2	Lauren Jackson	Australian Institute of Sport (1) / Canberra Capitals (3)	4	1999, 2000, 2003, 2004
3	Kathy Foster	North Adelaide Rockets (1) / Hobart Islanders (2)	3	1985, 1986, 1989
4	Karen Ogden	St Kilda Saints	2	1982, 1983
4	Julie Nykiel	Noarlunga Tigers	2	1984, 1988
4	Debbie Slimmon	Bulleen Melbourne Boomers	2	1990, 1992
4	Rachael Sporn	Adelaide Lightning	2	1996, 1997
4	Penny Taylor	Dandenong Rangers	2	2001, 2002
4	Katrina Hibbert	Bulleen Melbourne Boomers	2	2005, 2006

== See also ==
- All-WNBL Team
- WNBL Defensive Player of the Year Award
- WNBA Most Valuable Player Award
- NBL Most Valuable Player Award
- Australia women's national basketball team
