= 1998–99 WNBL season =

- League: Women's National Basketball League
- Sport: Basketball
- Duration: October 1998 – February 1999
- Number of teams: 8
- TV partner(s): ABC

Regular season
- Top seed: AIS
- Season MVP: Lauren Jackson (AIS)
- Top scorer: Lauren Jackson (AIS)

Finals
- Champions: AIS
- Runners-up: Perth Breakers
- Finals MVP: Kristen Veal (AIS)

WNBL seasons
- ← 1998 1999–2000 →

The 1998–99 WNBL season was the 19th season of competition since its establishment in 1981. A total of 8 teams contested the league.

== Team standings ==
#	WNBL Championship Ladder				
#	Team	W	L	PCT	GP
1	AIS	16	5	76.0	21
2	Perth Breakers	14	7	67.0	21
3	Adelaide Lightning	12	9	57.0	21
4	Melbourne Tigers	11	10	52.0	21
5	Bulleen Boomers	11	10	52.0	21
6	Sydney Flames	10	11	48.0	21
7	Dandenong Rangers	6	15	29.0	21
8	Canberra Capitals	4	17	19.00	21

== Finals ==
Semifinals
AIS	81
Perth Breakers	62
Adelaide Lightning	63
Melbourne Tigers	54

Preliminary final
Perth Breakers	67
Adelaide Lightning	46

Grand final
AIS	88
Perth Breakers	79

== Season award winners ==
Award	Winner	Team
Most Valuable Player Award	Lauren Jackson	AIS
Grand Final MVP Award	Kristen Veal	AIS
Rookie of the Year Award	Caitlin Ryan	Dandenong Rangers
Defensive Player of the Year Award	Emily McInerny	Melbourne Tigers
Coach of the Year Award	Phil Brown	AIS
Top Shooter Award	Lauren Jackson	AIS

== Statistics leaders ==
Category	Player	Team	GP	Totals	Average
Points Per Game	Lauren Jackson	AIS	20	463	23.2
Rebounds Per Game	Lauren Jackson	AIS	20	238	4.1
Assists Per Game	Kristen Veal	AIS	17	112	6.6
Steals Per Game	Tully Bevilaqua	Perth Breakers	20	48	2.4
Blocks per game	Jenny Whittle	Perth Breakers	21	53	2.5
Field Goal %	Lauren Jackson	AIS	20	(192/355)	54.1%
Three-Point Field Goal %	Rohanee Cox	Perth Breakers	21	(13/31)	41.9%
Free Throw %	Shelley Sandie	Canberra Capitals	21	(72/86)	83.7%
