= 1983 WNBL season =

- League: Women's National Basketball League (WNBL)
- Sport: Basketball
- Number of teams: 10
- TV partner(s): ABC

Regular season
- Top seed: St Kilda Saints
- Season MVP: (Australia) Karen Ogden (Australia) Robyn Maher
- Top scorer: (Australia) Julie Nykiel

Finals
- Champions: Nunawading Spectres
- Runners-up: St Kilda Saints

WNBL seasons
- ← 1982 1984 →

The 1983 WNBL season (Women's National Basketball League) was the third season of competition since its establishment in 1981. A total of 10 teams contested the league.

== Ladder ==
	Team	Played	Won	Lost	Won %
1	St Kilda Saints	17	14	3	82
2	Nunawading Spectres	17	13	4	76
3	Coburg Cougars	17	12	5	71
4	Australian Institute of Sport	18	12	6	67
5	West Adelaide Bearcats	17	9	8	53
6	North Adelaide Rockets	17	7	10	41
7	Brisbane Lady Bullets	10	3	7	30
8	Bankstown Bruins	17	5	12	29
9	Noarlunga Tigers	17	4	13	24
10	Sutherland Sharks	17	3	14	18

== Finals ==
Semi-finals
1	St Kilda Saints	72
4	Australian Institute of Sport	63
3	Coburg Cougars	60
2	Nunawading Spectres	63

Grand Final
1	St Kilda Saints	46
2	Nunawading Spectres	70

== 1983 WNBL Awards ==
Award	Winner	Team
Most Valuable Player Award	(Australia) Karen Ogden (Australia) Robyn Maher	St Kilda Saints; Nunawading Spectres
Top Shooter Award	(Australia) Julie Nykiel	Noarlunga Tigers
