= List of Australian WNBA players =

The following is a chronological list of Australian players who have played at least one game in the Women's National Basketball Association (WNBA). The list includes both past and present players. Active WNBA players are shown in bold.

== Australian WNBA players ==
#	**Player**	**Position**	**Drafted / Signed**	**Debut**	**Ref**
1	Michele Timms	Guard	Signed by the WNBA and assigned to the Phoenix Mercury on 22 January 1997	1997	
2	Rachael Sporn	Forward	Selected round 2 (pick 14 overall) in the 1998 WNBA draft by the Detroit Shock	1998	
3	Sandy Brondello	Shooting guard	Selected round 4 (pick 34 overall) in the 1998 WNBA draft by the Detroit Shock	1998	
4	Tully Bevilaqua	Guard	Signed by the Cleveland Rockers as a free agent before the start of the 1998 season	1998	
5	Michelle Brogan (m. Griffiths)	Forward	Signed by the Phoenix Mercury as a free agent before the start of the 1998 season	1998	
6	Carla Boyd (m. Porter)	Forward	Signed by the Detroit Shock as a free agent before the start of the 1998 season	1998	
7	Kristi Harrower	Point guard	Signed by the Phoenix Mercury as a free agent before the start of the 1998 season	1998	
8	Trisha Fallon	Guard/forward	Selected round 2 (pick 19 overall) in the 1999 WNBA draft by the Minnesota Lynx	1999	
9	Jenny Whittle	Centre	Selected round 4 (pick 37 overall) in the 1999 WNBA draft by the Washington Mystics	1999	
10	Annie La Fleur a (née Burgess)	Guard	Signed by the Minnesota Lynx as a free agent before the start of the 1999 season	1999	
11	Jessica Bibby	Guard	Selected round 3 (pick 45 overall) in the 2000 WNBA draft by the New York Liberty	2000	
12	Katrina Hibbert	Guard	Selected round 4 (pick 57 overall) in the 2000 WNBA draft by the Seattle Storm	2000	
13	Michelle Cleary (née Chandler)	Guard	Signed by the Phoenix Mercury as a free agent before the start of the 2000 season	2000	
14	Lauren Jackson	Forward/centre	Selected round 1 (pick 1 overall) in the 2001 WNBA draft by the Seattle Storm	2001	
15	Penny Taylor	Forward	Selected round 1 (pick 11 overall) in the 2001 WNBA draft by the Cleveland Rockers	2001	
16	Kristen Veal	Guard	Selected round 1 (pick 13 overall) in the 2001 WNBA draft by the Phoenix Mercury	2001	
17	Jae Kingi-Cross b	Guard	Selected round 2 (pick 22 overall) in the 2001 WNBA draft by the Detroit Shock	2001	
18	Suzy Batkovic-Brown	Centre	Selected round 2 (pick 22 overall) in the 2003 WNBA draft by the Seattle Storm	2005	
19	Belinda Snell	Guard	Signed by the Phoenix Mercury as a free agent following the 2004 Olympic Games	2005	
20	Laura Hodges (née Summerton)	Centre	Signed by the Connecticut Sun as a free agent in March 2005	2005	
21	Erin Phillips	Guard	Selected round 2 (pick 21 overall) in the 2005 WNBA draft by the Connecticut Sun	2006	
22	Leilani Mitchell c	Point guard	Selected round 2 (pick 25 overall) in the 2008 WNBA draft by the Phoenix Mercury	2008	
23	Kelsey Griffin d	Forward	Selected round 1 (pick 3 overall) in the 2010 WNBA draft by the Minnesota Lynx	2010	
24	Alison Lacey	Guard	Selected round 1 (pick 10 overall) in the 2010 WNBA draft by the Seattle Storm	2010	
25	Abby Bishop	Forward	Signed by the Seattle Storm as a free agent before the start of the 2010 season	2010	
26	Liz Cambage e	Centre	Selected round 1 (pick 2 overall) in the 2011 WNBA draft by the Tulsa Shock	2011	
27	Jenna O'Hea	Guard	Signed by the Los Angeles Sparks as a free agent before the 2011 season	2011	
28	Rachel Jarry	Forward	Selected round 2 (pick 18 overall) in the 2011 WNBA draft by the Atlanta Dream	2013	
29	**Rebecca Allen**	Forward	Signed by the New York Liberty as a free agent following the 2014 World Cup	2015	
30	Cayla George (née Francis)	Centre	Signed by the Phoenix Mercury as a free agent following the 2014 World Cup	2015	
31	Marianna Tolo	Centre	Signed by the Los Angeles Sparks as a free agent in February 2015	2015	
32	Tess Madgen	Guard/Forward	Signed by the Phoenix Mercury as a free agent in February 2015	2015	
33	**Stephanie Talbot**	Guard	Selected round 3 (pick 33 overall) in the 2014 WNBA draft by the Phoenix Mercury	2017	
34	**Sami Whitcomb** f	Shooting guard	Signed by the Seattle Storm as a free agent in February 2017	2017	
35	**Alanna Smith**	Forward	Selected round 1 (pick 8 overall) in the 2019 WNBA draft by the Phoenix Mercury	2019	
36	**Ezi Magbegor** g	Forward	Selected round 1 (pick 12 overall) in the 2019 WNBA draft by the Seattle Storm	2020	
37	Shyla Heal	Guard	Selected round 1 (pick 8 overall) in the 2021 WNBA draft by the Chicago Sky	2021	
38	**Amy Atwell**	Guard	Selected round 3 (pick 27 overall) in the 2022 WNBA draft by the Los Angeles Sparks	2022	
39	**Anneli Maley**	Forward	Signed by the Chicago Sky as a free agent in March 2022	2022	
40	**Kristy Wallace**	Guard	Selected round 2 (pick 16 overall) in the 2018 WNBA draft by the Atlanta Dream	2022	
41	**Jade Melbourne**	Guard	Selected round 3 (pick 33 overall) in 2022 WNBA draft by the Seattle Storm	2023	
42	Chloe Bibby	Forward / Stretch four	Signed by the Golden State Valkyries as a free agent in February 2025 before joining the Indiana Fever	2025	
43	**Georgia Amoore**	Point guard	Selected round 1 (pick 6th overall) in the 2025 WNBA draft by the Washington Mystics	2026	
44	**Miela Sowah**	Guard	Signed to a developmental contract by the Golden State Valkyries in May 2026	2026	
45	**Isobel Borlase**	Guard	Selected round 2 (pick 20th overall) in the 2024 WNBA draft by the Atlanta Dream	2026	
46	**Nyadiew Puoch**	Forward	Drafted round 2 (pick 16th overall) in the 2026 WNBA expansion draft by the Portland Fire	2026	
47	**Alex Fowler**	Forward	Signed to a developmental contract by the New York Liberty in May 2026	2026	

Key

- a Annie La Fleur was born in Port Moresby, Papua New Guinea, but moved to Australia as a child with her parents.
- b Jay Kingi-Cross was born in Wellington, New Zealand, but moved to Australia with her parents at age 4.
- c Leilani Mitchell was born in Richland, Washington, USA, to an Australian mother and American father and has dual citizenship. In December 2013, Mitchell pledged her allegiances to, and represents Australia internationally.
- d Kelsey Griffin was born in Anchorage, Alaska USA. Having obtained Australian citizenship in November 2015, Griffin pledged her allegiances to, and represents Australia internationally.
- e Liz Cambage was born in London, England, to a Nigerian father and Australian mother, but moved to Australia with her mother at three months old.
- f Sami Whitcomb was born and raised in Ventura, California. In February 2018, Whitcomb became an Australian citizen and represents Australia internationally.
- g Ezi Magbegor was born in Wellington, New Zealand, but moved to Australia at six years old.

== See also ==
- Australia women's national basketball team
- Australia under-19 women's national basketball team
- Basketball Australia
- Women's National Basketball League
- WNBL Most Valuable Player Award
- List of WNBA players born outside the United States
- List of Women's National Basketball Association players
- List of Australian NBA players
- List of Serbian WNBA players
