= 1985 WNBL season =

- League: Women's National Basketball League (WNBL)
- Sport: Basketball
- Number of teams: 11
- TV partner(s): ABC

Regular season
- Top seed: North Adelaide Rockets
- Season MVP: Kathy Foster (North Adelaide Rockets)
- Top scorer: Julie Nykiel (Noarlunga Tigers)

Finals
- Champions: Coburg Cougars
- Runners-up: Noarlunga Tigers
- Finals MVP: Karin Maar (Coburg Cougars)

WNBL seasons
- ← 1984 1986 →

The 1985 WNBL season was the fifth season of competition in the Australian Women's National Basketball League (WNBL) since its establishment in 1981. A total of 11 teams contested the league.

== Ladder ==
	Team	Played	Won	Lost	Won %
1	North Adelaide Rockets	18	15	3	83
2	Nunawading Spectres	18	14	4	78
3	Noarlunga Tigers	18	13	5	72
4	Coburg Cougars	18	13	5	72
5	Brisbane Lady Bullets	12	7	5	58
6	West Adelaide Bearcats	18	10	8	56
7	St Kilda Saints	18	9	9	50
8	Bankstown Bruins	19	7	12	37
9	Australian Institute of Sport	18	3	15	17
10	Bulleen Melbourne Boomers	18	3	15	17
11	Sutherland Sharks	19	3	16	16

== Finals ==
Semi-finals
1	North Adelaide Rockets	52
4	Coburg Cougars	56
3	Noarlunga Tigers	64
2	Nunawading Spectres	54

Grand Final
4	Coburg Cougars	73
3	Noarlunga Tigers	71

=== Season Awards ===
Award	Winner	Team
Most Valuable Player Award	Kathy Foster	North Adelaide Rockets
Grand Final MVP Award	Karin Maar	Coburg Cougars
Top Shooter Award	Julie Nykiel	Noarlunga Tigers
