= WNBL Leading Scorer Award =

The WNBL Leading Scorer Award is an annual Women's National Basketball League (WNBL) statistical award given since the 1981 WNBL season.

The Leading Scorer is determined by the player with the highest average points per game, throughout the regular season. To be eligible, players must have played in at least 50% of games played in the season. From 1981 to 2020, this award was previously known as the Top Shooter Award.

== Winners ==
	Denotes player whose team won championship that year
	Denotes player inducted into the Australian Basketball Hall of Fame
	Denotes player who is still active
Player (X)	Denotes the number of times the player had won at that time
Team (X)	Denotes the number of times a player from this team had won at that time

Season	Player	Points	PPG	Nationality	Team
1981	Julie Nykiel	288	22.1	Australia	Noarlunga Tigers
1982	Karen Ogden	410	24.1	Australia	St Kilda Saints
1983	Julie Nykiel (2)	398	23.4	Australia	Noarlunga Tigers (2)
1984	Julie Nykiel (3)	227	25.2	Australia	Noarlunga Tigers (3)
1985	Julie Nykiel (4)	297	19.8	Australia	Noarlunga Tigers (4)
1986	Karin Maar	500	20.0	Australia	Coburg Cougars
1987	Kathy Foster	415	20.8	Australia	Hobart Islanders
1988	Julie Nykiel (5)	452	21.5	Australia	Noarlunga Tigers (5)
1989	Kathy Foster (2)	517	20.7	Australia	Hobart Islanders (2)
1990	Debbie Slimmon	553	22.1	Australia	Bulleen Melbourne Boomers
1991	Joanne Metcalfe	479	21.8	Australia	Melbourne Tigers
1992	Jodie Murphy	376	17.9	Australia	Canberra Capitals
1993	Samantha Thornton	359	18.9	Australia	Dandenong Rangers
1994	Sandy Brondello	340	17.0	Australia	Brisbane Blazers
1994	Shelley Gorman	340	17.0	Australia	Sydney Flames
1995	Sandy Brondello (2)	357	20.0	Australia	Brisbane Blazers (2)
1996	Gina Stevens	375	21.3	Australia	Perth Breakers
1997	Rachael Sporn	429	21.0	Australia	Adelaide Lightning
1998	Allison Cook	232	19.0	Australia	Bulleen Melbourne Boomers (2)
1998–99	Lauren Jackson	463	23.2	Australia	Australian Institute of Sport
1999–00	Trisha Fallon	434	20.7	Australia	Sydney Flames (2)
2000–01	Penny Taylor	536	25.5	Australia	Dandenong Rangers (2)
2001–02	Penny Taylor (2)	570	28.5	Australia	Dandenong Rangers (3)
2002–03	Lauren Jackson (2)	462	27.2	Australia	Canberra Capitals (2)
2003–04	Lauren Jackson (3)	391	27.9	Australia	Canberra Capitals (3)
2004–05	Belinda Snell	427	20.3	Australia	Sydney Uni Flames (3)
2005–06	Deanna Smith	456	21.7	Australia	Perth Lynx (2)
2006–07	Hollie Grima	403	19.0	Australia	Bulleen Melbourne Boomers (3)
2007–08	Natalie Porter	566	24.6	Australia	Sydney Uni Flames (4)
2008–09	Rohanee Cox	466	21.2	Australia	Townsville Fire
2009–10	Suzy Batkovic	491	24.6	Australia	Sydney Uni Flames (5)
2010–11	Liz Cambage	490	22.3	Australia	Bulleen Boomers (4)
2011–12	Suzy Batkovic (2)	439	24.3	Australia	Adelaide Lightning (2)
2012–13	Suzy Batkovic (3)	405	21.3	Australia	Adelaide Lightning (3)
2013–14	Jenna O'Hea	453	20.6	Australia	Dandenong Rangers (4)
2014–15	Abby Bishop	506	23.0	Australia	Canberra Capitals (4)
2015–16	Suzy Batkovic (4)	498	20.8	Australia	Townsville Fire (2)
2016–17	Sami Whitcomb	567	23.6	United States	Perth Lynx (3)
2017–18	Liz Cambage (2)	451	23.7	Australia	Melbourne Boomers (5)
2018–19	Asia Taylor	415	19.7	United States	Perth Lynx (4)
2019–20	Kia Nurse	447	21.3	Canada	Canberra Capitals (5)
2020	Liz Cambage (3)	307	23.6	Australia	Southside Flyers (5)
2021–22	Anneli Maley	316	19.8	Australia	Bendigo Spirit
2022–23	Tiffany Mitchell	364	20.2	United States	Melbourne Boomers (6)
2023–24	Aari McDonald	257	19.8	United States	Perth Lynx (5)
2024–25	Sami Whitcomb (2)	440	21.0	Australia	Bendigo Spirit (2)
2025–26	Isobel Borlase	524	22.8	Australia	Bendigo Spirit (3)

== See also ==
- WNBL Leading Rebounder Award
- WNBL Golden Hands Award
- WNBA Peak Performers
- WNBL Most Valuable Player Award
- All-WNBL Team
