= WNBL Breakout Player of the Year Award =

Annual award for the Women's National Basketball League

The WNBL Breakout Player of the Year is an annual Women's National Basketball League (WNBL) award given since the 1988 WNBL season. The award is named the Betty Watson Breakout Player of the Year Award.

Between 1988 and 1994, the award was known as the WNBL Youth Player of the Year. It was then known as the WNBL Rookie of the Year between 1995 and 2019. The award returned to Youth Player of the Year for the 2019–20 season, with new criteria seeing Australian players 23 years old or under eligible. In 2022–23, the award was again redefined, to acknowledge any breakout player with an improved overall performance each season.

== Winners ==
	Denotes player inducted into the Australian Basketball Hall of Fame
	Denotes player who is still active
Player (X)	Denotes the number of times the player had won at that time
Team (X)	Denotes the number of times a player from this team had won at that time

Season	Player	Position	Nationality	Team
1988	Lucille Hamilton		Australia	Australian Institute of Sport
1989	Renae Fegent		Australia	Australian Institute of Sport (2)
1990	Trisha Fallon		Australia	Australian Institute of Sport (3)
1991	Michelle Brogan		Australia	Noarlunga Tigers
1992	Allison Cook		Australia	Melbourne Tigers
1993	Allison Cook (2)		Australia	Melbourne Tigers (2)
1994	Maryanne Difrancesco		Australia	Melbourne Tigers (3)
1995	Chika Emeagi		Australia	Australian Institute of Sport (4)
1996	Jessica Bibby	Guard	Australia	Dandenong Rangers
1997	Lauren Jackson	Forward/center	Australia	Australian Institute of Sport (5)
1998	Andrea Cartledge		Australia	Melbourne Tigers (4)
1998–99	Caitlin Ryan	Guard	Australia	Dandenong Rangers (2)
1999–00	Shelley Hammonds	Center	Australia	Australian Institute of Sport (6)
2000–01	Laura Summerton	Forward	Australia	Australian Institute of Sport (7)
2001–02	Alison Downie	Forward	Australia	Dandenong Rangers (3)
2001–02	Kamala Lamshed		Australia	Adelaide Lightning
2002–03	Kelly Wilson	Guard	Australia	Australian Institute of Sport (8)
2003–04	Kathleen MacLeod	Guard	Australia	Australian Institute of Sport (9)
2004–05	Renae Camino	Guard	Australia	Australian Institute of Sport (10)
2005–06	Abby Bishop	Forward/center	Australia	Australian Institute of Sport (11)
2006–07	Cayla Francis	Forward/center	Australia	Australian Institute of Sport (12)
2007–08	Nicole Hunt	Guard	Australia	Australian Institute of Sport (13)
2008–09	Sarah Graham	Guard	Australia	Logan Thunder
2009–10	Tayla Roberts	Forward/center	Australia	Australian Institute of Sport (14)
2010–11	Gretel Tippett	Forward/center	Australia	Logan Thunder (2)
2011–12	Carley Mijović	Forward	Australia	Australian Institute of Sport (15)
2012–13	Stephanie Talbot	Guard	Australia	Adelaide Lightning (2)
2013–14	Alex Wilson	Guard	Australia	Townsville Fire
2014–15	Lauren Scherf	Forward	Australia	Dandenong Rangers (4)
2015–16	Alex Ciabattoni	Forward	Australia	Adelaide Lightning (3)
2016–17	Monique Conti	Guard	Australia	Melbourne Boomers
2017–18	Ezi Magbegor	Forward	Australia	Canberra Capitals
2018–19	Jazmin Shelley	Guard	Australia	Melbourne Boomers (2)
2019–20	Ezi Magbegor (2)	Forward	Australia	Melbourne Boomers (3)
2020	Shyla Heal	Guard	Australia	Townsville Fire (2)
2021–22	Ezi Magbegor (3)	Forward	Australia	Melbourne Boomers (4)
2022–23	Isobel Borlase	Guard	Australia	Adelaide Lightning (4)
2023–24	Alex Sharp	Guard	Australia	Canberra Capitals (2)
2024–25	Abbey Ellis	Guard	Australia	Townsville Fire (3)
2025–26	Dallas Loughridge	Guard	Australia	Adelaide Lightning (5)
