= Tracey Browning =

Australian basketball player

Personal information
- Born: 7 December 1963 (age 62)
Medal record
Women's Basketball
Representing Australia

Tracey Browning (born 7 December 1963) is a former Australian women's basketball player.

== Biography ==
Browning played for the Australia women's national basketball team during the late 1980s and early 1990s and competed for Australia at the 1990 World Championship held in Brazil.

In the domestic Women's National Basketball League (WNBL), Browning played 282 games for the Australian Institute of Sport (1982 & 1983), Coburg Cougars (1984 & 1985), Nunawading Spectres (1986 – 1991) and the Dandenong Rangers (1992 – 1995).

In the 1987 Grand Final between the Nunawading Spectres and Coburg Cougars, Browning was awarded the MVP. Having played over 250 games in the WNBL, Browning was awarded Life Membership in 1989.

Starating in 2001, she worked at the adult lifestyle exhibition, Sexpo. As of 2014, she was the general manager, having staged 65 shows.
