= WNBL Coach of the Year Award =

The WNBL Coach of the Year Award is an annual Women's National Basketball League (WNBL) award given since the 1987 WNBL season.

== Winners ==
	Denotes coach whose team won championship that year
	Denotes coach/player inducted into the Australian Basketball Hall of Fame
	Denotes coach who is currently active
Player (X)	Denotes the number of times the player had won at that time
Team (X)	Denotes the number of times a player from this team had won at that time

Season	Coach	Nationality	Team
1987	Tom Maher	Australia	Nunawading Spectres
1988	Robbie Cadee	Australia	Bankstown Bruins
1989	Mark Molitor	Australia	North Adelaide Rockets
1990	Jenny Cheesman	Australia	Australian Institute of Sport
1991	Jerry Lee	Australia	Canberra Capitals
1992	Tom Maher (2)	Australia	Perth Breakers
1993	Jan Stirling	Australia	Adelaide Lightning
1994	Ray Tomlinson	Australia	Melbourne Tigers
1995	Guy Molloy	Australia	Perth Breakers (2)
1996	Lori Chizik	Canada	Bulleen Melbourne Boomers
1997	Bill Tomlinson	Australia	Sydney Flames
1998	Phil Brown	Australia	Australian Institute of Sport (2)
1998–99	Phil Brown (2)	Australia	Australian Institute of Sport (3)
1999–00	Mark Wright	Australia	Dandenong Rangers
2000–01	Mark Wright (2)	Australia	Dandenong Rangers (2)
2001–02	Karen Dalton	Australia	Sydney Panthers (2)
2002–03	David Herbert	Australia	Townsville Fire
2003–04	Gary Fox	Australia	Dandenong Rangers (3)
2004–05	Cheryl Chambers	Australia	Bulleen Melbourne Boomers (2)
2005–06	Gary Fox (2)	Australia	Dandenong Rangers (4)
2006–07	Carrie Graf	Australia	Canberra Capitals (2)
2007–08	Carrie Graf (2)	Australia	Canberra Capitals (3)
2008–09	Cheryl Chambers (2)	Australia	Bulleen Boomers (3)
2009–10	Tom Maher (3)	Australia	Bulleen Boomers (4)
2010–11	Tom Maher (4)	Australia	Bulleen Boomers (5)
2011–12	Peter Buckle	Australia	Adelaide Lightning (2)
2012–13	Bernie Harrower	Australia	Bendigo Spirit
2013–14	Guy Molloy (2)	Australia	Melbourne Boomers (6)
2014–15	Shannon Seebohm	Australia	Sydney Uni Flames (3)
2015–16	Andy Stewart	Australia	Perth Lynx (3)
2016–17	Cheryl Chambers (3)	Australia	Sydney Uni Flames (4)
2017–18	Andy Stewart (2)	Australia	Perth Lynx (4)
2018–19	Chris Lucas	Australia	Adelaide Lightning (3)
2019–20	Paul Goriss	Australia	Canberra Capitals (4)
2020	Shannon Seebohm (2)	Australia	Townsville Fire (2)
2021–22	Ryan Petrik	Australia	Perth Lynx (5)
2022–23	Shannon Seebohm (3)	Australia	Townsville Fire (3)
2023–24	Shannon Seebohm (4)	Australia	Townsville Fire (4)
2024–25	Shannon Seebohm (5)	Australia	Townsville Fire (5)
2025–26	Kennedy Kereama	New Zealand	Bendigo Spirit (2)
