= 1982 WNBL season =

- League: Women's National Basketball League (WNBL)
- Sport: Basketball
- Teams: 10
- TV partner: ABC

Regular season
- Top seed: Bankstown Bruins
- Season MVP: (Australia) Karen Ogden
- Top scorer: (Australia) Karen Ogden

Finals
- Champions: St. Kilda Saints
- Runners-up: Bankstown Bruins

WNBL seasons
- ← 1981 1983 →

The 1982 WNBL season was the second season of competition since the establishment of Women's National Basketball League in 1981. A total of 10 teams contested the league.

== Ladder ==
	Team	Played	Won	Lost	Won %
1	Bankstown Bruins	12	10	2	83
2	St. Kilda Saints	15	11	4	73
3	Noarlunga Tigers	14	10	4	71
4	West Adelaide Bearcats	17	10	7	59
5	Nunawading Spectres	15	9	6	60
6	Australian Institute of Sport	15	7	8	47
7	North Adelaide Rockets	14	5	9	36
8	Catholic Young Men's Society	15	6	9	40
9	Brisbane Comets	9	1	8	11
10	Sutherland Sharks	12	0	12	0

== Finals ==
Semi-finals
1	Bankstown Bruins	71
4	West Adelaide Bearcats	66
3	Noarlunga Tigers	64
2	St Kilda Saints	74

Grand Final
1	Bankstown Bruins	56
2	St Kilda Saints	62

== Season Awards ==
Award	Winner	Team
Most Valuable Player Award	(Australia) Karen Ogden	St Kilda Saints
Top Shooter Award	(Australia) Karen Ogden	St Kilda Saints
