= Chika Emeagi =

Australian basketball player

No. 14 – Australian Institute of Sport Melbourne Tigers Perth Breakers
- Position: Forward
- League: WNBL

Personal information
- Born: 4 January 1979 (age 47) Box Hill, Victoria, Australia
- Listed height: 6 ft 1 in (1.85 m)

Career highlights
- WNBL Rookie of the Year Award (1995)

Chika Maree Emeagi (born 4 January 1979) is a retired Australian women's basketball player, who represented the country at both junior and senior levels.

== Biography ==
Emeagi commenced playing in the Women's National Basketball League (WNBL) in 1995. Since then, Emeagi has played for the AIS (1995/96), Melbourne Tigers (1997 to 1998/99) and Perth Breakers (1999/00), totalling 107 games. Emeagi stopped playing basketball in Australia following the 1999/00 season, at the age of 21, deciding instead to play in Europe.

In season 1995, Emeagi won the WNBL Rookie of the Year Award for the most outstanding first year player. She was described as an exciting and talented player.

At official FIBA events, Emeagi played for Australia at the 1997 World Championship for Junior Women, where she won a Silver medal. At that tournament, Emeagi led the scoring for Australia with 105 points at an average of 15.0 points per game, outscoring teammate Lauren Jackson with 100 points at 14.3.
