= WNBL Defensive Player of the Year Award =

The WNBL Defensive Player of the Year Award is an annual Women's National Basketball League (WNBL) award given since the 1990 WNBL season to the best defensive player throughout the regular season. Since 2000, the award has been known as the Robyn Maher Defensive Player of the Year (commonly known as the Maher Medal). Emily McInerny has won the award nine times, while Tully Bevilaqua has won it on four occasions.

== Winners ==
	Denotes player whose team won championship that year
	Denotes player inducted into the Australian Basketball Hall of Fame
	Denotes player who is still active
Player (X)	Denotes the number of times the player had won at that time
Team (X)	Denotes the number of times a player from this team had won at that time

Season	Player	Position	Nationality	Team
1990	Karen Dalton		Australia	Sydney Bruins
1991	Kim Foley		United States	Hobart Islanders
1992	Robyn Maher		Australia	Perth Breakers
1993	Karen Dalton (2)		Australia	Sydney Flames (2)
1994	Robyn Maher (2)		Australia	Sydney Flames (3)
1995	Tully Bevilaqua	Guard	Australia	Perth Breakers (2)
1996	Tully Bevilaqua (2)	Guard	Australia	Perth Breakers (3)
1997	Tully Bevilaqua (3)	Guard	Australia	Perth Breakers (4)
1998	Emily McInerny	Forward	Australia	Melbourne Tigers
1998–99	Emily McInerny (2)	Forward	Australia	Melbourne Tigers (2)
1999–00	Tully Bevilaqua (4)	Guard	Australia	Perth Breakers (5)
2000–01	Emily McInerny (3)	Forward	Australia	Dandenong Rangers
2001–02	Emily McInerny (4)	Forward	Australia	Dandenong Rangers (2)
2002–03	Natalie Porter	Forward	Australia	Townsville Fire
2003–04	Emily McInerny (5)	Forward	Australia	Dandenong Rangers (3)
2004–05	Emily McInerny (6)	Forward	Australia	Dandenong Rangers (4)
2005–06	Emily McInerny (7)	Forward	Australia	Dandenong Rangers (5)
2006–07	Emily McInerny (8)	Forward	Australia	Dandenong Rangers (6)
2007–08	Emily McInerny (9)	Forward	Australia	Dandenong Rangers (7)
2008–09	Alicia Poto	Guard	Australia	Sydney Uni Flames (4)
2009–10	Rachael Flanagan	Guard	Australia	Townsville Fire (2)
2010–11	Rachael Flanagan (2)	Guard	Australia	Townsville Fire (3)
2011–12	Alicia Poto (2)	Guard	Australia	Sydney Uni Flames (5)
2012–13	Kristi Harrower	Guard	Australia	Bendigo Spirit
2013–14	Rebecca Allen	Forward	Australia	Melbourne Boomers
2014–15	Kelsey Griffin	Forward	United States	Bendigo Spirit (2)
2015–16	Stephanie Cumming	Guard	Australia	Dandenong Rangers (8)
2016–17	Marianna Tolo	Center	Australia	Canberra Capitals
2017–18	Kayla Pedersen	Forward	United States	Dandenong Rangers (9)
2018–19	Lauren Nicholson	Guard	Australia	Adelaide Lightning
2019–20	Mercedes Russell	Center	United States	Southside Flyers (10)
2020	Stephanie Talbot	Guard/forward	Australia	Adelaide Lightning (2)
2021–22	Brittney Sykes	Guard	United States	Canberra Capitals (2)
2022–23	Stephanie Talbot (2)	Guard/forward	Australia	Adelaide Lightning (3)
2023–24	Lauren Nicholson (2)	Guard	Australia	Sydney Flames (6)
2024–25	Lauren Cox	Forward	United States	Townsville Fire (4)
2025–26	Han Xu	Center	China	Perth Lynx (6)

== Multi-time winners ==
Rank	Player	Team(s)	Awards	Years
1	Emily McInerny	Melbourne Tigers (2) / Dandenong Rangers (7)	9	1998, 1999, 2001, 2002, 2004, 2005, 2006, 2007, 2008
2	Tully Bevilaqua	Perth Breakers	4	1999, 2000, 2003, 2004
3	Karen Dalton	Sydney Flames	2	1990, 1993
3	Robyn Maher	Perth Breakers (1) / Sydney Flames (1)	2	1992, 1994
3	Rachael McCully	Townsville Fire	2	2010, 2011
3	Alicia Poto	Sydney Uni Flames	2	2009, 2012
3	Stephanie Talbot	Adelaide Lightning	2	2020, 2023
3	Lauren Nicholson	Adelaide Lightning (1) / Sydney Flames (1)	2	2019, 2024

== See also ==
- WNBL All-Star Five
- WNBL Most Valuable Player Award
- WNBA Defensive Player of the Year Award
- NBL Best Defensive Player Award
- Australia women's national basketball team
