= 2016–17 WNBL season =

- League: Women's National Basketball League
- Sport: Basketball
- Duration: 7 October 2016 – 17 March 2017
- Teams: 8

Regular season
- Top seed: Sydney Uni Flames
- Season MVP: Suzy Batkovic Fire
- Top scorer: Sami Whitcomb Lynx

Finals
- Champions: Sydney Uni Flames
- Runners-up: Dandenong Rangers
- Finals MVP: Leilani Mitchell Flames

WNBL seasons
- ← 2015–16 2017–18 →

The 2016–17 WNBL season is the 37th season of competition since its establishment in 1981. The regular season begins on October 7, 2016 when the Sydney Uni Flames host the Perth Lynx and is scheduled to conclude on February 19, 2017. Townsville Fire were the two-time defending champions, but they were defeated by the Sydney Uni Flames in the Semifinals. The Flames would go on to take home their fourth WNBL title, their first in sixteen years, after defeating the Dandenong Rangers in the final.

== Team standings ==
#	WNBL Championship Ladder				
#	Team	W	L	PCT	GP
1	Sydney Uni Flames	18	6	75.00	24
2	Dandenong Rangers	15	9	62.50	24
3	Perth Lynx	15	9	62.50	24
4	Townsville Fire	14	10	58.33	24
5	Canberra Capitals	13	11	54.17	24
6	Bendigo Spirit	13	11	54.17	24
7	Melbourne Boomers	5	19	20.83	24
8	Adelaide Lightning	3	21	12.50	24

== Finals ==
Semifinals
1	Sydney Uni Flames	2
4	Townsville Fire	0
3	Perth Lynx	1
2	Dandenong Rangers	2

Grand Final
1	Sydney Uni Flames	2
2	Dandenong Rangers	0

== Statistics ==
=== Individual statistic leaders ===
Category	Player	Team	Statistic
Points per game	Sami Whitcomb	Perth Lynx	23.6 PPG
Rebounds per game	Mikaela Ruef	Canberra Capitals	11.0 RPG
Assists per game	Leilani Mitchell	Sydney Uni Flames	6.2 APG
Steals per game	Sami Whitcomb	Perth Lynx	2.8 SPG
Blocks per game	Jennifer Hamson	Sydney Uni Flames	2.6 BPG

=== Individual game highs ===
Category	Player	Team	Statistic
Points	Sami Whitcomb	Perth Lynx	41
Rebounds	Mikaela Ruef	Canberra Capitals	22
Assists	Leilani Mitchell	Sydney Uni Flames	11
Steals	Samantha Logic	Adelaide Lightning	7
Blocks	Suzy Batkovic	Townsville Fire	6

== Awards ==
=== Player of the Week Award ===
Round #	Player	Team
Round 1	Suzy Batkovic	Townsville Fire
Round 2	Marianna Tolo	Canberra Capitals
Round 3	Sami Whitcomb	Perth Lynx
Round 4	Nayo Raincock-Ekunwe	Bendigo Spirit
Round 5	Lauren Mansfield	Canberra Capitals
Round 6	Asia Taylor	Sydney Uni Flames
Round 7	Kelsey Griffin	Bendigo Spirit
Round 8	Marianna Tolo (2)	Canberra Capitals
Round 9	Suzy Batkovic (2)	Townsville Fire
Round 10	Stephanie Cumming	Dandenong Rangers
Round 11	Kelsey Griffin (2)	Bendigo Spirit
Round 12	Asia Taylor (2)	Sydney Uni Flames
Round 13	Tayla Roberts	Adelaide Lightning
Round 14	Ally Malott	Dandenong Rangers
Round 15	Leilani Mitchell	Sydney Uni Flames
Round 16	Belinda Snell	Sydney Uni Flames
Round 17	Suzy Batkovic (3)	Townsville Fire
Round 18	Kelly Wilson	Townsville Fire
Round 19	Nayo Raincock-Ekunwe (2)	Bendigo Spirit

=== Team of the Week Award ===
Round #	Team				
Round 1	Natalie Novosel Rangers	Sami Whitcomb Lynx	Laura Hodges Lightning	Suzy Batkovic Fire	Jennifer Hamson Flames
Round 2	Leilani Mitchell Flames	Sami Whitcomb (2) Lynx	Stephanie Cumming Rangers	Nayo Raincock-Ekunwe Spirit	Marianna Tolo Capitals
Round 3	Leilani Mitchell (2) Flames	Sami Whitcomb (3) Lynx	Stephanie Cumming (2) Rangers	Alice Kunek Boomers	Asia Taylor Flames
Round 4	Kerryn Harrington Spirit	Sami Whitcomb (4) Lynx	Sara Blicavs Rangers	Nayo Raincock-Ekunwe (2) Spirit	Mikaela Ruef Capitals
Round 5	Lauren Mansfield Capitals	Mia Murray Fire	Kelsey Griffin Spirit	Asia Taylor (2) Flames	Marianna Tolo (2) Capitals
Round 6	Amy Kame Fire	Sami Whitcomb (5) Lynx	Stephanie Cumming (3) Rangers	Nayo Raincock-Ekunwe (3) Spirit	Asia Taylor (3) Flames
Round 7	Kate Gaze Capitals	Sami Whitcomb (6) Lynx	Kelsey Griffin (2) Spirit	Asia Taylor (4) Flames	Mikaela Ruef (2) Capitals
Round 8	Leilani Mitchell (3) Flames	Sami Whitcomb (7) Lynx	Kayla Standish Fire	Lauren Scherf Rangers	Marianna Tolo (3) Capitals
Round 9	Mia Murray (2) Fire	Sami Whitcomb (8) Lynx	Sara Blicavs (2) Rangers	Suzy Batkovic (2) Fire	Mikaela Ruef (3) Capitals
Round 10	Stephanie Cumming (4) Rangers	Sara Blicavs (3) Rangers	Kelsey Griffin (3) Spirit	Suzy Batkovic (3) Fire	Jennifer Hamson (2) Flames
Round 11	Brittany Smart Boomers	Sami Whitcomb (9) Lynx	Kelsey Griffin (4) Spirit	Suzy Batkovic (4) Fire	Asia Taylor (5) Flames
Round 12	Leilani Mitchell (4) Flames	Sami Whitcomb (10) Lynx	Brittany Smart (2) Boomers	Suzy Batkovic (5) Fire	Asia Taylor (6) Flames
Round 13	Amy Kame (2) Fire	Sami Whitcomb (11) Lynx	Colleen Planeta Lightning	Tayla Roberts Lightning	Ruth Hamblin Lynx
Round 14	Leilani Mitchell (5) Flames	Samantha Logic Lightning	Ally Malott Rangers	Suzy Batkovic (6) Fire	Marianna Tolo (4) Capitals
Round 15	Leilani Mitchell (6) Flames	Sara Blicavs (4) Rangers	Asia Taylor (7) Flames	Suzy Batkovic (7) Fire	Marianna Tolo (5) Capitals
Round 16	Belinda Snell Flames	Sami Whitcomb (12) Lynx	Laura Hodges (2) Lightning	Nayo Raincock-Ekunwe (4) Spirit	Marianna Tolo (6) Capitals
Round 17	Mia Murray (3) Fire	Sami Whitcomb (13) Lynx	Asia Taylor (8) Flames	Suzy Batkovic (8) Fire	Marianna Tolo (7) Capitals
Round 18	Belinda Snell (2) Flames	Kelly Wilson Fire	Alex Ciabattoni Lightning	Abigail Wehrung Capitals	Carley Mijović Lynx
Round 19	Natalie Novosel (2) Rangers	Colleen Planeta (2) Lightning	Nayo Raincock-Ekunwe (5) Spirit	Suzy Batkovic (9) Fire	Marianna Tolo (8) Capitals

=== Player & Coach of the Month Awards ===
For games played	Player of the Month		Coach of the Month	
For games played	Player	Team	Coach	Team
October 2016	Sami Whitcomb	Perth Lynx	Simon Pritchard	Bendigo Spirit
November 2016	Marianna Tolo	Canberra Capitals	Cheryl Chambers	Sydney Uni Flames
December 2016	Suzy Batkovic	Townsville Fire	Larissa Anderson	Dandenong Rangers
January 2017	Leilani Mitchell	Sydney Uni Flames	Cheryl Chambers (2)	Sydney Uni Flames

=== Postseason Awards ===
Award	Winner	Position	Team
Most Valuable Player Award	Suzy Batkovic	Center	Townsville Fire
Grand Final MVP Award	Leilani Mitchell	Guard	Sydney Uni Flames
Rookie of the Year Award	Monique Conti	Guard	Melbourne Boomers
Defensive Player of the Year Award	Marianna Tolo	Center	Canberra Capitals
Top Shooter Award	Sami Whitcomb	Guard	Perth Lynx
Coach of the Year Award	Cheryl Chambers	Coach	Sydney Uni Flames
All-Star Five	Leilani Mitchell	Guard	Sydney Uni Flames
All-Star Five	Sami Whitcomb	Guard	Perth Lynx
All-Star Five	Asia Taylor	Forward	Sydney Uni Flames
All-Star Five	Suzy Batkovic	Center	Townsville Fire
All-Star Five	Marianna Tolo	Center	Canberra Capitals

== Team Captains & Coaches ==
Team	Captain	Coach
Adelaide Lightning	Laura Hodges	Chris Lucas
Bendigo Spirit	Kelsey Griffin	Simon Pritchard
Canberra Capitals	Marianna Tolo / Carly Wilson (co)	Paul Goriss
Dandenong Rangers	Aimie Clydesdale / Stephanie Cumming (co)	Larissa Anderson
Melbourne Boomers	Alice Kunek	Guy Molloy
Perth Lynx	Tessa Lavey	Andy Stewart
Sydney Uni Flames	Belinda Snell	Cheryl Chambers
Townsville Fire	Suzy Batkovic	Claudia Brassard
