= Isobel Borlase =

Australian basketball player (born 2004)

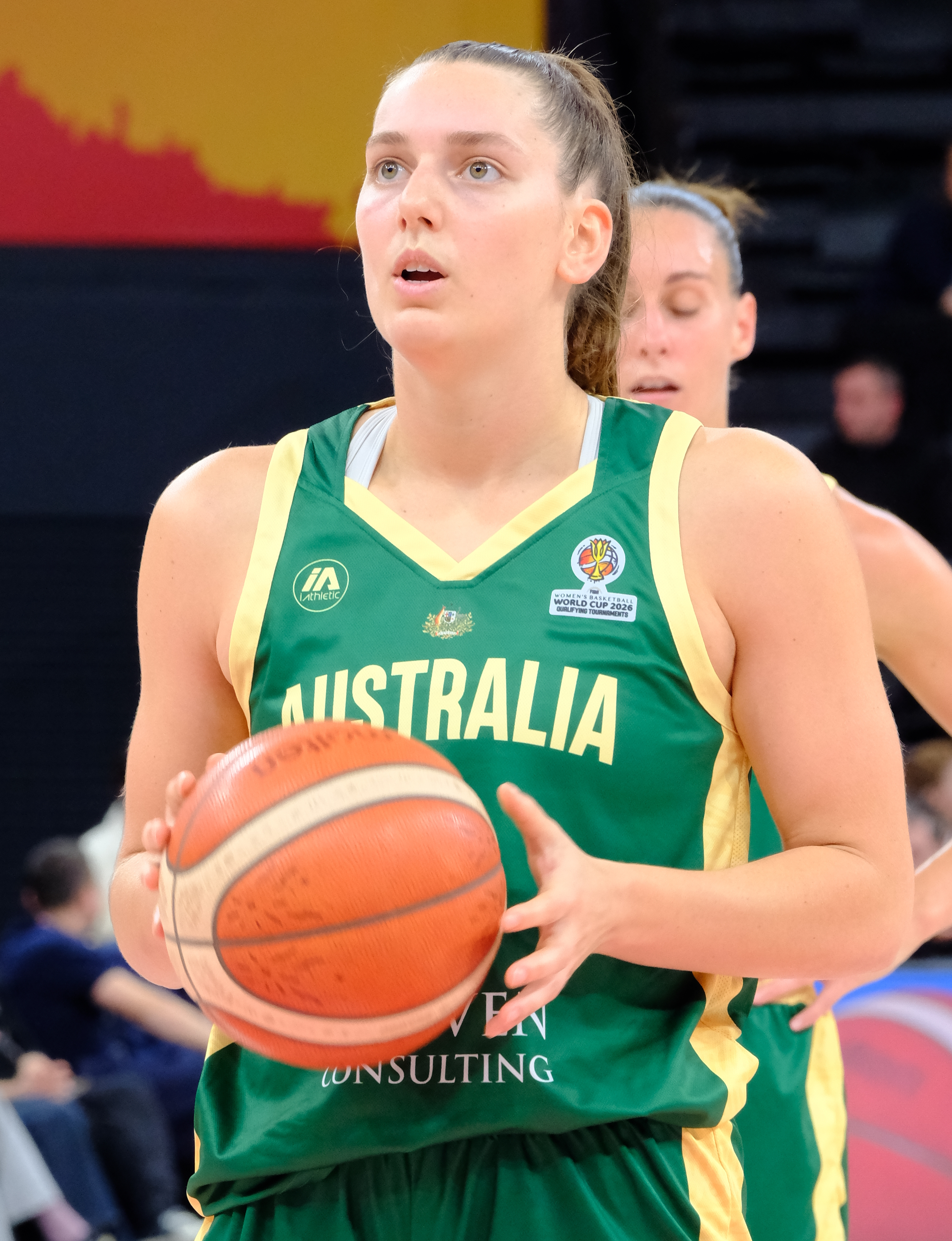
- Borlase with the Australian Opals in 2026

No. 20 – Atlanta Dream
- Position: Guard
- League: WNBA

Personal information
- Born: 12 September 2004 (age 22) Melbourne, Victoria, Australia
- Listed height: 180 cm (5 ft 11 in)

Career information
- High school: Loreto College (Adelaide, South Australia); Mercedes College (Adelaide, South Australia); Lake Ginninderra College (Canberra, ACT)
- WNBA draft: 2024: 2nd round, 20th overall pick
- Drafted by: Atlanta Dream
- Playing career: 2021–present

Career history
- 2021–2022: BA Centre of Excellence
- 2022–2025: Adelaide Lightning
- 2023–2024: Forestville Eagles
- 2025: Melbourne Tigers
- 2025–present: Bendigo Spirit
- 2026–present: Atlanta Dream

Career highlights
- WNBL Most Valuable Player (2026); 2× All-WNBL First Team (2024, 2026); WNBL scoring champion (2026); WNBL Sixth Woman of the Year (2023); WNBL Breakout Player of the Year (2023)
- Stats at Basketball Reference
Medals
Women's basketball
Representing Australia
Olympic Games
Bronze medal – third place	2024 Paris	Team
Asia Cup
Gold medal – first place	2025 China
Under-19 World Cup
Silver medal – second place	2021 Hungary	National team
Under-18 Asian Championship
Gold medal – first place	2022 India	National team

Isobel Borlase (born 12 September 2004) is an Australian professional basketball player for the Atlanta Dream of the Women's National Basketball Association (WNBA). She is also contracted with the Bendigo Spirit of the Women's National Basketball League (WNBL). She debuted for the Adelaide Lightning of the WNBL in 2022, and in 2023 won the WNBL Sixth Woman of the Year and WNBL Breakout Player of the Year. In 2024, she was named to the All-WNBL First Team and was drafted 20th overall by the Atlanta Dream in the WNBA draft. In 2026, she was named the WNBL Most Valuable Player.

Borlase helped the Australian Gems win silver at the 2021 FIBA Under-19 World Cup and gold at the 2022 FIBA Under-18 Asian Championship.

== Early life and career ==
Borlase was born in Melbourne, Victoria, in the suburb of Sandringham. She grew up in Adelaide, South Australia, where she attended Loreto College and Mercedes College. She played junior basketball for the Forestville Eagles and led South Australia Metro to victory at the 2021 Australian Under-18 Championships. She also played netball and did surf lifesaving.

Borlase joined the BA Centre of Excellence in 2021, where she played in four games in the Waratah League. While in Canberra, she attended Lake Ginninderra College.

== Professional career ==
In January 2022, Borlase joined the Adelaide Lightning of the Women's National Basketball League (WNBL) for the rest of the 2021–22 season. She appeared in one game.

With the Centre of Excellence in the NBL1 during the 2022 season, Borlase averaged 13.57 points, 5.29 rebounds, 2.64 assists and 2.0 steals in 14 games.

In September 2022, Borlase re-signed the Adelaide Lightning for the 2022–23 WNBL season. In the season opener, she had 25 points and nine rebounds in a loss to the Southside Flyers. She finished the season averaging 13.5 points per game. She was subsequently named WNBL Sixth Woman of the Year and WNBL Breakout Player of the Year.

Borlase joined the Forestville Eagles of the NBL1 Central for the 2023 season, but appeared in only two games. A back injury limited her during the 2023 off-season.

In May 2023, Borlase re-signed the Adelaide Lightning for the 2023–24 WNBL season. She entered WNBA draft pick discussions in her second full season, and with team captain Stephanie Talbot sidelined, she began shouldering more responsibility. On 7 January 2024, she scored a career-high 31 points in an 84–68 loss to the Perth Lynx. She was named to the All-WNBL First Team after averaging 15.6 points, 4.7 rebounds and 2.5 assists per game.

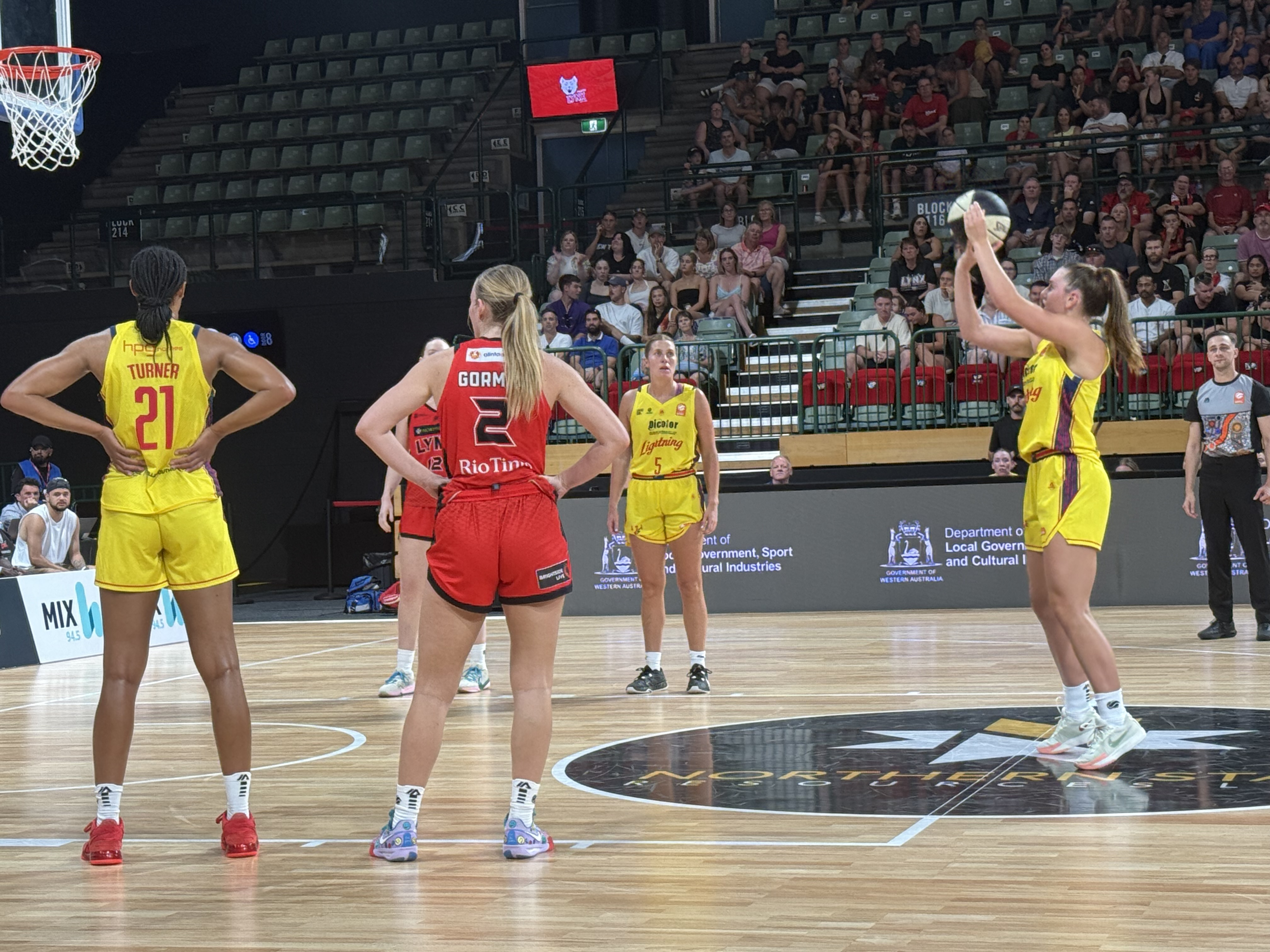
Borlase (right) shooting a free throw with the Adelaide Lightning in January 2025

On 15 April 2024, Borlase was selected by the Atlanta Dream with the 20th overall pick in the 2024 WNBA draft. Choosing to remain in Adelaide for another 12 months, Borlase joined the Forestville Eagles for the 2024 NBL1 Central season. In six games for the Eagles, she averaged 15.33 points, 5.33 rebounds, 3.17 assists and 2.33 steals per game.

Borlase returned to the Adelaide Lightning for the 2024–25 WNBL season. She averaged 14.6 points, 4.4 rebounds and 2.1 assists per game.

Borlase joined the Melbourne Tigers of the NBL1 South for the 2025 season.

On 5 June 2025, Borlase signed with the Bendigo Spirit for the 2025–26 WNBL season. On 21 January 2026, she scored a career-high 42 points in a 98–88 win over the Southside Melbourne Flyers, becoming the first player to score 42 points in a WNBL game since Penny Taylor in 2002, and just the 11th player in league history to reach the mark. She led the league in scoring with 22.9 points per game, the highest average in five years, alongside 6.3 rebounds and 3.5 assists per game with a 90.7 free throw percentage and a 45.6 field goal accuracy. She was subsequently named the WNBL Most Valuable Player, becoming the youngest WNBL MVP winner since Liz Cambage (19 years old) in 2011 and the fifth to win the league's MVP as a 21-year-old or younger, joining Cambage, Lauren Jackson, Penny Taylor and Allison Cook. Borlase also earned All-WNBL First Team for the second time in three years. In the semi-finals, the Spirit lost 2–0 to the Perth Lynx despite Borlase's 22 points, 16 rebounds and seven assists in game one, and 23 points, eight rebounds and eight assists in game two.

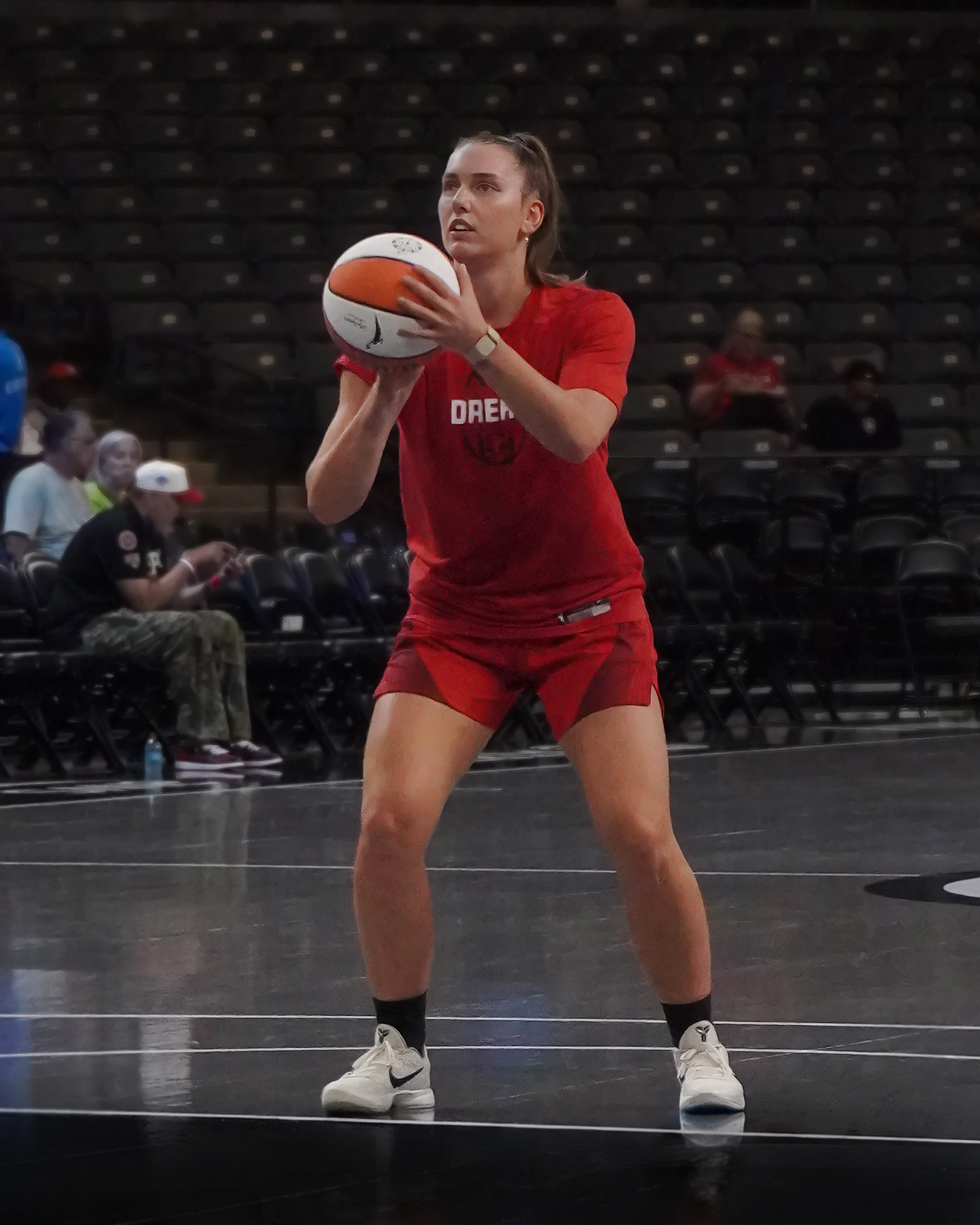
Borlase with the Atlanta Dream in 2026

On 12 April 2026, Borlase signed a rookie scale contract with the Atlanta Dream for the 2026 WNBA season. On 14 June 2026, she scored a career-high 17 points in a 102–77 win over the Toronto Tempo. The Dream reached the WNBA Finals, where they lost in seven games to the Golden State Valkyries. In game seven, Borlase recorded eight points and two rebounds in 14 minutes off the bench.

She is set to re-join the Spirit for the 2026–27 WNBL season.

== National team career ==
Borlase debuted for Australia at the 2021 FIBA Under-19 World Cup in Hungary with the Gems. She helped the Gems win the silver medal.

In 2022, Borlase helped the Gems win the gold medal at the FIBA Under-18 Asian Championship in India. She was named to the All-Star Five after averaging 14.4 points, 7.6 rebounds, 4.4 assists and 2.8 steals per game.

Borlase played for the Gems at the 2023 FIBA Under-19 World Cup in Spain.

In July 2024, Borlase was named in the Australian Opals' final squad for the Paris Olympics. She helped the Opals win the bronze medal.

In April 2025, Borlase was named in the Opals squad for a trans-Tasman series against New Zealand in May. She was subsequently selected for the Opals' final squad for the 2025 FIBA Women's Asia Cup in China.

In July 2026, Borlase was named in the final Opals squad for the 2026 FIBA Women's Basketball World Cup.

== Personal life ==
Borlase is the daughter of Darryl Borlase and Jenny Borlase. Her father played Australian rules football for the Port Adelaide Football Club while her mother played for the Australian netball team. Her older sister, Ella, has represented Australia in surfboat rowing while her older brother, James, is also a footballer who made his AFL debut in 2023 with the Adelaide Crows.

== Career statistics ==
Legend
GP	Games played	GS	Games started	MPG	Minutes per game	RPG	Rebounds per game
APG	Assists per game	SPG	Steals per game	BPG	Blocks per game	PPG	Points per game
TO	Turnovers per game	FG%	Field-goal percentage	3P%	3-point field-goal percentage	FT%	Free-throw percentage
**Bold**	Career best	°	League leader

=== WNBA ===
==== Regular season ====
WNBA regular season statistics
Year	Team	GP	GS	MPG	FG%	3P%	FT%	RPG	APG	SPG	BPG	TO	PPG
2026	Atlanta	44°	1	13.0	.433	.324	.895	1.5	1.0	.3	.1	.8	4.8
**Career**	1 year, 1 team	44	1	13.0	.433	.324	.895	1.5	1.0	.3	.1	.8	4.8
