= Nfinity Athletic Corporation =

- Type: Private
- Founded: 2003
- Headquarters: Atlanta, GA
- Key people: Tate Chalk (Founder/President/CEO)
- Products: Women's Performance Footwear and Apparel
- Website: Nfinity.com

Nfinity is headquartered in Atlanta, Georgia, in the United States. Nfinity markets cheerleading, basketball, and volleyball shoes and apparel particularly for female athletes. Nfinity designs shoes for a segment of female athletes, and has attempted to break into the apparel space but is not succeeding, attempting to fit to the biochemical needs to enhance athletic performance and lower the risk of injury.
