= Ray Tomlinson (basketball) =

Australian basketball player

Personal information
- Full name: Raymond John Tomlinson
- Nationality: Australian
- Born: 19 February 1948 (age 77); Melbourne, Australia

Sport
- Sport: Basketball

Raymond John Tomlinson (born 19 February 1948) is an Australian basketball player. He competed in the men's tournament at the 1972 Summer Olympics and the 1976 Summer Olympics. In 2006, Tomlinson was inducted into the Australian Basketball Hall of Fame.
