= Julie Nykiel =

Australian basketball player

Personal information
- Born: 13 December 1958 (age 67) Noarlunga, South Australia

Sport
- Country: Australia
- Sport: Basketball

Julie Dawn Nykiel OAM (born 13 December 1958) is a former Australian women's basketball player.

== Biography ==
=== Basketball ===
Nykiel played for the national team between 1979 and 1990, competing at two Olympic Games; 1984 and 1988. Nykiel also represented Australia at three World Championships - 1979, 1983 and 1986.

In the domestic competition, Nykiel was the Women's National Basketball League (WNBL) Most Valuable Player in 1984 and 1988. Her single-game record of 53 points (set in 1982) stood for over 20 years and was achieved without the benefit of a three-point line. Nykiel led the WNBL in points scored on 5 occasions; 1981, 1983, 1984, 1985 & 1988. In 2006, Nykiel polled as the 7th greatest Australian female basketball player in the 25-year team. Nykiel is also recognised as one of the leading players in WNBL history.

=== Netball ===
Nykiel also played netball for Contax. Together with Kathryn Harby, she was a member of the Contax teams that won the 1990 and 1991 South Australia state league titles.

== Honours and recognition ==
In the 1997 Australia Day Honours Nykiel was awarded the Medal of the Order of Australia (OAM). In 2000 she was awarded the Australian Sports Medal and in 2001 the Centenary Medal.

Nykiel was inducted into the Australian Basketball Hall of Fame in 2004.

== See also ==
- WNBL Top Shooter Award
- WNBL All-Star Five
