= Jenny Whittle =

Australian basketball player (born 1973)

Personal information
- Born: 5 September 1973 (age 53) Gold Coast, Queensland
- Listed height: 6 ft 6 in (1.98 m)

Career information
- WNBA draft: 1999: 4th round, 37th overall pick
- Drafted by: Washington Mystics
- Position: Centre

Career highlights
- 4× WNBL All-Star Five (1996, 1997, 2005, 2006); 2× WNBL champion (2006, 2008); Australian Basketball Hall of Fame (2016)
- Stats at Basketball Reference
Medals
Women's basketball
Representing Australia
Olympic Games
Silver medal – second place	2000 Sydney	Team competition
Bronze medal – third place	1996 Atlanta	Team competition
World Cups
Gold medal – first place	2006 Brazil	Team competition
Bronze medal – third place	2002 China	Team competition
Bronze medal – third place	1998 Germany	Team competition
World Junior Championships
Gold medal – first place	1993 Seoul	Team competition
Commonwealth Games
Gold medal – first place	2006 Melbourne	Team competition

Jennifer Hazel (Jenny) Whittle (born 5 September 1973) is a retired Australian women's basketball player. Whittle was a regular member of the national team for over a decade, from 1994 until 2006. Playing Centre, Whittle was a key contributor to the Opals' success at international events during the 1990s and 2000s, with strong rebounding and defence a feature of her game. Following an outstanding national and WNBL career, Whittle was elected to the Australian Basketball Hall of Fame in 2016.

== Biography ==
=== National team ===
Whittle broke into the Australian side as a 20-year-old, following her success at the 1993 World Championship for Junior Women, where she won a Gold medal. Averaging 10.1 points per contest, the centre added six points and provided a dominant defensive presence under the rim in the gold medal game as Australia defeated Russia 72–54. She was immediately placed on the Opals radar. At that tournament, Whittle played alongside other future Opals stars, Michelle Brogan, Kristi Harrower, Carla Boyd and Jo Hill. The following year, Whittle was selected to play for the Opals at the 1994 World Championship for Women, held in Australia. The young side finished a respectable 4th and would mark the start of a highly successful era for Whittle and the Opals.

Whittle was selected to play for Australia at the 1996 Atlanta Olympics. That team would go on to win a Bronze medal earning Australia its first ever international basketball medal for either men or women at the senior level. At the 1998 World Championships held in Germany, Whittle would win her second bronze medal. Playing in front of a home crowd at the Sydney 2000 Olympics, Whittle won a Silver medal, her second medal at an Olympic Games. At the 2002 World Championship held in China, the Opals and Whittle would win their 4th consecutive medal in international play, claiming another Bronze.

Having retired following the 2002 World Championship, Whittle was not considered for selection to represent Australia at the 2004 Olympics in Athens. However, later that year former Opals coach Tom Maher convinced Whittle to break her retirement. That decision led to the highlight of Whittle's career at the 2006 World Championship held in Brazil. As co-captain of the team with Lauren Jackson, the Opals won the tournament and first ever Gold medal at an official international event. In a sign of true respect for Whittle, after Jackson accepted the World Championship trophy, she walked down the line of Opals players and handed it to Whittle. Earlier that year, Whittle would also win a gold medal at the Commonwealth Games, again as co-captain with Lauren Jackson.

Following the Opals success at the 2006 World Championship, Whittle retired from international competition, saying, "it's the right time to go" and "it's great to leave the international game on top". Whittle ended her career having played 262 games for the Opals, 5th highest all-time. Her six medals (2 Gold, 1 Silver & 3 Bronze) at official FIBA tournaments makes Whittle one of Australia's most successful and decorated basketball players at the international level. Whittle has also been referred to as one of the Opals best ever players. Along with her Gold medal win at the 2006 World Championship, Whittle also named the Sydney Olympics as a career event highlight, as well as playing alongside World Champions Lauren Jackson and Tully Bevilaqua.

In 2013, Whittle was one of several former players on new Opals head coach, Brendan Joyce, list to be appointed as the assistant coach, but she declared herself unavailable. In November 2013, Whittle was inducted into the Gold Coast Sporting Hall of Fame, joining other recipients that included golfer Greg Norman and five-time World 500cc champion Mick Doohan. Also in November 2013, Kristi Harrower named the 12 best Opals players she had played with over 20 years and named Whittle in that team.

The link between three of Australian basketball's greatest moments internationally, Whittle was elected to the Australian Basketball Hall of Fame in 2016. Whittle provided the height that had been lacking from Australia's line-ups in years past and her rebounding and rim protection proved critical to Australia's chances, becoming the mainstay in the middle of the Australian defence for over a decade. Whittle was described as a cornerstone of the golden age for the Opals.

=== WNBL ===
In the domestic Women's National Basketball League (WNBL), Whittle played 295 games for the Australian Institute of Sport (1989–1991), Brisbane Blazers (1992–1997), Perth Breakers (1998–1999), Bulleen Boomers (2000), Canberra Capitals (2005–2006) and Adelaide Lightning (2007–2009). When Whittle retired in 2009, her 295 career games ranked 11th all-time. Whittle's three years at the Australian Institute of Sport was as a scholarship holder. Despite missing several seasons while playing in Europe, Whittle holds the WNBL all-time records for blocked shots (673) and defensive assists (106). She also ranks in the all-time top 10 for points scored (3,670), defensive rebounds (1,842), total rebounds (2,255) and turnovers (727).

Whittle was selected to the WNBL All-Star Five on four occasions; 1996, 1997, 2004/05 and 2005/06. Also in 2005/06, Whittle was named the Canberra Capitals Most Valuable Player. Whittle won WNBL Championships with Canberra in 2005/06 and with Adelaide Lightning in 2007/08.

Having played over 250 games in the WNBL, Whittle was awarded Life Membership in 2006.

=== WNBA ===
Whittle nominated for the 1999 Women's National Basketball Association draft and was selected in the fourth round (pick 37 overall) by the Washington Mystics. In 1999, she played in 3 games before returning to Australia to concentrate on playing for Australia at the 2000 Sydney Olympics and practice full-time with the team. In 2001, Whittle was playing in Europe, but returned to the WNBA where she played a further 4 games for the Mystics. On 14 June 2001, Whittle was placed on the injured list and eight days later her contract was terminated by the Mystics. She returned to Europe to play.

=== European Leagues ===
For a number of years from the late 1990s until the mid 2000s, Whittle played professionally in Europe – with distinction – with the Burgos club in the Spanish Basketball League, Tarbes in the French Basketball League and Pécs 2010 in the Hungarian Basketball League.

== See also ==
- Australian Basketball Hall of Fame
- WNBL All-Star Five
- Basketball Australia
- List of Australian WNBA players
- List of women Olympic medalists in Basketball
