= Allison Tranquilli =

Australian basketball player

Personal information
- Full name: Allison Petra Cook-Tranquilli
- Born: 12 August 1972 (age 54) Melbourne, Victoria, Australia
Medal record
Women's Basketball
Representing Australia
Olympic Games
Silver medal – second place	2004 Athens	Team competition
Bronze medal – third place	1996 Atlanta	Team competition

Allison Petra Cook-Tranquilli (born 12 August 1972 in Melbourne, Victoria) is an Australian former basketball player. A two-time Olympian, she was a member of the national women's team (Opal's) that claimed the bronze medal at the 1996 Summer Olympics in Atlanta, Georgia. She attended the Australian Institute of Sport in 1990–1991. She was inducted into the Australian Basketball Hall of Fame in 2019 alongside Lauren Jackson.

Tranquilli played in the Women's National Basketball League (WNBL) lasted 10 years (1990 to 2000) and 227 games; over that time she played a total of 227 games for the AIS, Melbourne Tigers, Dandenong Rangers (now the Southside Melbourne Flyers), and Bulleen Melbourne Boomers (now the Geelong Venom). She is the only player to win the WNBL Betty Watson Rookie of the Year award twice (1992, 1993). In 1993, she was named the recipient of the WNBL Most Valuable Player Award and the WNBL Rookie of the Year Award as a member of the Melbourne Tigers, becoming the first and only player to win both in the same year. That season (1993) she averaged 17.8 points, 7.3 assists, and 1.6 steals, with a 41% Field Goal Percentage, 40% Three-Point Field Goal Percentage, and 82% Free-Throw Percentage. In 1998 while playing for the Bulleen Melbourne Boomers she was the league's leading scorer with a total 232 points and an average of 19.0 points per game. She was named on the WNBL All-Star Five six times in 1992, 1993, 1994, 1995, 1997, 1998; which is the equal-third most in the league (tied with Lauren Jackson and Jenna O'Hea).

The guard represented Australia on the international stage many times, with her first appearance Australia with "a Youth team tour of the USA and her performances there helped her earn a spot with the Opals just a year later in 1991." She debut as an Opal was at the 1994 FIBA World Championship for Women's team, and she played at two more FIBA World Championships in 1998 and 2002. She made her Olympic debut with the Opal's at the 1996 Olympic Games winning a Bronze Medal, and her final appearance as an Opal was at the 2004 Olympic Games where she won a Silver Medal. After not being selected for the Opal's squad for the Sydney 2000 Olympics, she pivoted to playing overseas to hone her game, which paid off with her return to the Opal's in 2002 and 2004.

== See also ==
- WNBL Top Shooter Award
- WNBL Rookie of the Year Award
