= Trisha Fallon =

Australian basketball player (born 1972)

Trish Fallon
Personal information
- Born: 23 July 1972 (age 54) Melbourne, Victoria, Australia
Medal record
Women's Basketball
Representing Australia
Olympic Games
| Bronze medal – third place | 1996 Atlanta | National team |
| Silver medal – second place | 2000 Sydney | National team |
| Silver medal – second place | 2004 Athens | National team |
World Championships
| Bronze medal – third place | 2002 China | Team competition |

Trisha Nicole Dykstra (née Fallon; born 23 July 1972) is an Australian former basketball player in the Australian Women's National Basketball League and the Women's National Basketball Association (WNBA) of the United States. She also played with the Australian national team during the three consecutive Summer Olympics, starting in 1996, including as captain at the 2004 Athens Olympics. Fallon started her career at age sixteen.

Fallon was selected by the Minnesota Lynx in the second round (19th pick overall) of the 1999 WNBA draft. After the 1999 WNBA season, she was traded to the Phoenix Mercury along with Adia Barnes and Tonya Edwards in exchange for Marlies Askamp, Angela Aycock and Kristi Harrower on 27 October 1999.

Fallon was married to Stuart Dykstra on 29 July 2007 in Port Douglas, Queensland.

In 2010 Fallon was inducted into the Australian Basketball Hall of Fame.

She has remained involved with basketball in Australia having worked for the Sydney Uni Flames and now with the Dandenong Rangers Basketball Association in Victoria. She is also the Team Manager for the Australian Opals.

Fallon had a decorated basketball career and played 224 games for Australia at junior and senior level including 34 games as the Opals Captain.

== Career highlights ==
- Three-time Olympian (two silver and one bronze medal)
- Two World Championships (bronze medal in 2002)
- Maher Medal - International Player of the Year
- Played 251 in the WNBL for three clubs, AIS, Melbourne and Sydney between 1989 and 2007
- WNBL Youth Player of the Year - 1991
- Four Time WNBL All-Star Selection 1996, 1997, 1999/00, 2004/05
- WNBL Co-MVP in 1999/2000
- Member of the WNBL's 25th Anniversary Team
- Played with numerous teams in Europe including Spain's Ros Casares Valencia, with whom she won the Spanish Cup in 2003

== WNBA career statistics ==
Legend
| GP | Games played | GS | Games started | MPG | Minutes per game | RPG | Rebounds per game |
| APG | Assists per game | SPG | Steals per game | BPG | Blocks per game | PPG | Points per game |
| TO | Turnovers per game | FG% | Field-goal percentage | 3P% | 3-point field-goal percentage | FT% | Free-throw percentage |
| **Bold** | Career best | ° | League leader |

=== Regular season ===
| Year | Team | GP | GS | MPG | FG% | 3P% | FT% | RPG | APG | SPG | BPG | TO | PPG |
|---|---|---|---|---|---|---|---|---|---|---|---|---|---|
| 1999 | Minnesota | 26 | 0 | 10.8 | .300 | .353 | .742 | 0.8 | 0.8 | 0.4 | 0.2 | 0.6 | 3.0 |
| 2001 | Phoenix | **31** | **16** | **27.1** | **.490** | **.405** | **.815** | **2.5** | **1.1** | **1.1** | **0.4** | 1.5 | **10.4** |
| Career | 2 years, 2 teams | 57 | 16 | 19.7 | .445 | .389 | .792 | 1.7 | 1.0 | 0.8 | 0.3 | 1.1 | 7.0 |

== See also ==
- List of Australian WNBA players
- WNBL Most Valuable Player Award, (season 1999–00)
- WNBL Rookie of the Year Award, (season 1990)
- WNBL Top Shooter Award, (season 1999–00)
- WNBL All-Star Five, (seasons 1996, 1997, 1999–00 & 2004–05)
