= Kathy Foster (basketball) =

Australian basketball player

Personal information
- Born: 7 May 1960 (age 66) Launceston, Tasmania

Sport
- Country: Australia
- Sport: Basketball

Kathryn Joy Foster (born 7 May 1960) is an Australian former basketball player.

== Biography ==
Foster played for the national team between 1981 and 1988, competing at the 1984 Olympic Games in Los Angeles. Foster also represented Australia at two World Championships – 1983 and 1986. Foster was vice-captain of the team from 1983 until her international retirement in early 1988.

In the domestic competition, Foster was the Women's National Basketball League (WNBL) Most Valuable Player on three occasions; 1985, 1986 and 1989. Playing for the North Adelaide Rockets and later the Hobart Islanders, Foster was the WNBL first three-time winner of the award. Foster was also named to the WNBL All-Star Five in 1989 and 1990. Foster also won the WNBL Top Shooter Award on two occasions, 1987 and 1989 with 415 and 517 points respectively.

In 2013, Foster was elected to the Australian Basketball Hall of Fame.
