= Tully Bevilaqua =

Australian basketball player (born 1972)

Personal information
- Born: 19 July 1972 (age 54) Merredin, Western Australia, Australia
- Listed height: 5 ft 7 in (1.70 m)
- Listed weight: 145 lb (66 kg)

Career information
- WNBA draft: 1998: undrafted
- Playing career: 1998–2012
- Position: Guard
- Coaching career: 2023–present

Career history

Playing
- 1991–2000: Perth Breakers
- 1998: Cleveland Rockers
- 2000–2002: Portland Fire
- 2000–2001: DJK Wildcats Aschaffenburg
- 2001–2003: GYSEV Sopron
- 2003–2004: Seattle Storm
- 2003–2004: Perth Lynx
- 2004–2008: Canberra Capitals
- 2005–2010: Indiana Fever
- 2010–2011: West Coast Waves
- 2011–2012: San Antonio Silver Stars

Career highlights
- WNBA champion (2004); Kim Perrot Sportsmanship Award (2007)
- Stats at WNBA.com
- Stats at Basketball Reference
Medals
Women's basketball
Representing Australia
Olympic Games
Silver medal – second place	2008 Beijing	Team competition
World Championship
Gold medal – first place	2006 Brazil	Team competition
Commonwealth Games
Gold medal – first place	2006 Melbourne	Team competition

Tully Louise Bevilaqua (née Crook on 19 July 1972) is an Australian retired professional women's basketball player. She previously served as an assistant with the Phoenix Mercury in 2023; she was added to the Indiana Fever coaching staff as a video associate in 2024. She formerly played for the San Antonio Stars in the WNBA and the Perth Lynx in Australia's WNBL. The 5'7" Bevilaqua's play style is energetic and disruptive, so much so that she is usually in the top 10 in steals. In the 2005 regular season, she had more steals per turnover than any other player.

== WNBA career ==
Bevilaqua went undrafted but was signed by the Cleveland Rockers as a free agent before the 1998 season began. She appeared in 12 regular-season games before being waived by the team in July 1998.

In 2000, she signed a free agent contract with the Portland Fire and played with them for three seasons until the franchise folded after the 2002 season.

In 2003, she signed another contract with the Seattle Storm, and played two seasons for them, capping the 2004 season when the Storm won the WNBA Championship, defeating the Connecticut Sun, two games to one.

In 2005, she signed with the Indiana Fever, and led them to a #2 seed in the playoffs, where they swept the New York Liberty in two games, but in turn were swept by the Connecticut Sun in the Eastern Conference Finals.

Bevilaqua did not make the Australian national team until 2006 at the age of 34, when she helped lead the Opals to the gold medal in the 2006 FIBA World Championship for Women.

On 27 August 2007, Bevilaqua played a key scoring, defensive, and leadership role in the greatest comeback in WNBA history when the Indiana Fever overcame a 22-point first half deficit to win the deciding game three of the Eastern Conference Semi-Finals against the Connecticut Sun. Later that week on 31 August 2007 Tully was awarded the Kim Perrot Sportsmanship Award from the WNBA.

The WNBA listed Bevilaqua's height at 5'7" (about 170 cm), though she was listed at only 164 cm (about 5'4.5") in the WNBL.

Bevilaqua is one of only four WNBA players to record at least 800 career assists and 500 career steals.

== 2004 Championship season ==
One of the highlights of Bevilaqua's career was her participation on the 2004 Seattle Storm championship team. In the championship series, the Connecticut Sun won the first game of a three-game series. Then, before sold-out crowds at Seattle's KeyArena, Bevilaqua and the Storm won the second and third games to take the crown as champion. Bevilaqua's role in the series was backup point guard to Sue Bird and Betty Lennox, but she contributed in every phase of the game—scoring, rebounding, and playing the tenacious defense that has become her trademark on the Indiana Fever.

Though listed as a backup guard, in the course of the Storm's 2004 championship run Bevilaqua played unusually long minutes. This was most evident in the second game against the Minnesota Lynx. Sue Bird was injured early in the game, and WNBA Finals MVP Betty Lennox quickly got into foul trouble. Storm coach Anne Donovan sent Bevilaqua in to run the offense, and she played 27 minutes to carry the team to victory. The Seattle crowd chanted her name repeatedly during the game.

== WNBL career ==
In June 2010, Bevilaqua signed with the Perth Lynx (later rebranded to West Coast Waves) for the 2010–11 WNBL season.

== Accolades ==
In August 2021, Bevilaqua was inducted into the Basketball WA Hall of Fame.

== Personal life ==
Bevilaqua was born in Merredin, Western Australia in 1972. She played Australian rules football as a youth. Her hobbies include karaoke singing, golfing, tennis, cricket, and reading Patricia Cornwell's novels. Bevilaqua wrote a regular column in The Canberra Times on the progress of the Canberra Capitals during the 2006/07 WNBL season, and helped launch Nfinity's women-specific basketball shoes in 2009.

In 2013, Bevilaqua married her partner Lindsay, with the union becoming official with Indiana's recognition of same-sex marriage in October 2014. Tully and Lindsay have two children, Parker and Mackenzie.

== Career statistics ==
Legend
GP	Games played	GS	Games started	MPG	Minutes per game	RPG	Rebounds per game
APG	Assists per game	SPG	Steals per game	BPG	Blocks per game	PPG	Points per game
TO	Turnovers per game	FG%	Field-goal percentage	3P%	3-point field-goal percentage	FT%	Free-throw percentage
**Bold**	Career best	°	League leader

†	Denotes seasons in which Bevilaqua won a WNBA championship

=== WNBA ===
==== Regular season ====
Year	Team	GP	GS	MPG	FG%	3P%	FT%	RPG	APG	SPG	BPG	TO	PPG
1998	Cleveland	11	2	11.5	**.571**	.333	.667	.9	2.1	1.1	**.2**	.8	1.9
2000	Portland	32°	32°	24.9	.357	.283	**.778**	**3.0**	2.8	1.3	**.2**	2.1	4.8
2001	Portland	31	31	25.4	.328	.315	.732	2.8	**3.3**	1.9	**.2**	1.7	4.9
2002	Portland	27	19	15.6	.410	.417	.655	1.2	1.6	.8	.1	1.0	3.1
2003	Seattle	31	0	8.1	.333	.381	.762	.8	1.0	.5	.0	.6	1.9
2004†	Seattle	**34**°	0	10.5	.400	**.423**	.690	.8	.9	1.1	.1	.8	2.3
2005	Indiana	31	31	28.2	.389	.379	.545	2.0	2.6	1.9	.0	1.6	6.3
2006	Indiana	**34**°	**34**°	**29.7**	.411	.311	.717	2.3	2.3	**2.1**	.0	1.6	**6.6**
2007	Indiana	**34**°	**34**°	26.5	.440	.371	.682	2.2	2.7	1.6	.1	1.6	5.3
2008	Indiana	30	30	29.2	.405	.337	.607	2.3	2.2	2.0	.1	1.2	5.8
2009	Indiana	**34**°	32	25.3	.376	.346	.667	2.3	2.9	1.8	**.2**	1.4	6.1
2010	Indiana	**34**	27	19.4	.383	.338	.583	2.1	1.6	1.4	.1	1.2	3.9
2011	San Antonio	**34**°	25	14.5	.451	.286	.722	1.4	1.6	.7	.1	.7	2.9
2012	San Antonio	28	0	5.6	.167	.125	.500	.3	.4	.3	.0	**.3**	.2
Career	14 years, 5 teams	425	297	20.2	.392	.341	.687	1.8	2.0	1.3	.1	1.2	4.2

==== Playoffs ====
Year	Team	GP	GS	MPG	FG%	3P%	FT%	RPG	APG	SPG	BPG	TO	PPG
2004†	Seattle	8°	0	13.9	**.471**	.429	.750	2.0	1.4	1.0	.1	1.1	2.8
2005	Indiana	4	4	**38.0**	.320	.429	.714	2.3	2.8	**1.8**	.3	2.5	6.8
2006	Indiana	2	2	31.0	.200	.333	.667	**3.0**	1.0	.5	.0	**.0**	4.5
2007	Indiana	6	6	35.8	.295	.286	.833	2.7	**3.2**	**1.8**	.0	1.3	**7.3**
2008	Indiana	3	3	31.3	.292	.278	**1.000**	2.3	2.3	1.0	.0	.3	6.7
2009	Indiana	**10**	**10**	22.4	.340	.313	.700	2.3	2.0	1.2	.1	1.1	5.3
2010	Indiana	3	3	22.0	.429	**.444**	–	.7	1.3	.7	.0	1.7	5.3
2011	San Antonio	3	0	12.3	.429	.333	–	2.0	1.0	.0	**.7**	.7	2.7
Career	8 years, 3 teams	39	28	24.6	.335	.333	.750	2.2	2.0	1.1	.1	1.2	5.1

== See also ==
- List of Australian WNBA players
- WNBL Defensive Player of the Year Award
