= Debbie Slimmon =

Australian basketball player

Personal information
- Full name: Deborah Lee Slimmon
- Born: 3 April 1967 (age 59) Melbourne, Victoria

Sport
- Country: Australia
- Sport: Women's basketball

Deborah Lee "Debbie" Slimmon (born 3 April 1967) is a retired Australian women's basketball player.

== Biography ==
Slimmon played for the national team between 1987 and 1990, competing at the 1988 Olympic Games in Seoul. Slimmon also represented Australia at the 1985 FIBA Under-19 World Championship held in the United States.

In the domestic competition, Slimmon was the Women's National Basketball League (WNBL) Most Valuable Player on two occasions; 1990 and 1992. Although Slimmon represented Australia at only one Olympic Games and at no World Championships, she is still considered one of Australia’s best ever women basketballers. Slimmon was also named to the WNBL All-Star Five on four occasions; 1988, 1989, 1990 and 1995. In season 1990, Slimmon set a WNBL record with 553 points scored at an average of 22.1 per game. This record would remain for 12 years until broken by Penny Taylor in season 2001/02 with 570 points.

== See also ==
- WNBL Top Shooter Award
- WNBL All-Star Five
