= Michelle Brogan =

Australian basketball player (born 1973)

Personal information
- Born: 8 February 1973 (age 53) Adelaide, Australia
Medal record
Women's Basketball
Representing Australia
Olympic Games
Bronze medal – third place	1996 Atlanta	Team competition
Silver medal – second place	2000 Sydney	Team competition
World Championships
Bronze medal – third place	1998 Germany	Team competition
Bronze medal – third place	2002 China	Team competition
World Junior Championships
Gold medal – first place	1993 Seoul	Team competition

Michelle Brogan (born 8 February 1973) is an Australian former basketball player who won the bronze medal with the Australia women's national basketball team at the 1996 Summer Olympics. Four years later she was on the side that claimed the silver medal in Sydney, Australia, when she was known as Michelle Griffiths. She attended the Australian Institute of Sport in 1988–1990.

Michelle Brogan is the older sister of former National Basketball league player and AFL player Dean Brogan.

Brogan's son, Bailey Griffiths, played for South Adelaide in the SANFL. Her son, Che, played for the Adelaide 36ers in the NBL.

== Career statistics ==
Legend
GP	Games played	GS	Games started	MPG	Minutes per game	RPG	Rebounds per game
APG	Assists per game	SPG	Steals per game	BPG	Blocks per game	PPG	Points per game
TO	Turnovers per game	FG%	Field-goal percentage	3P%	3-point field-goal percentage	FT%	Free-throw percentage
**Bold**	Career best	°	League leader

=== WNBA ===
==== Regular season ====
Year	Team	GP	GS	MPG	FG%	3P%	FT%	RPG	APG	SPG	BPG	TO	PPG
1998	Phoenix	**30**°	**25**	**26.0**	.505	**.478**	.796	**4.4**	1.4	**1.5**	**.2**	1.7	**9.2**
2000	Phoenix	28	23	25.9	**.511**	.320	**.797**	4.0	**1.8**	1.1	**.2**	**1.3**	7.5
Career	2 years, 1 team	58	48	25.9	.508	.396	.797	4.2	1.6	1.3	.2	1.5	8.4

==== Playoffs ====
Year	Team	GP	GS	MPG	FG%	3P%	FT%	RPG	APG	SPG	BPG	TO	PPG
1998	Phoenix	**6**	**6**	**28.5**	**.500**	**.455**	.650	**6.5**	**2.3**	**.7**	.3	1.7	**12.3**
2000	Phoenix	2	2	26.0	.385	.250	**.786**	4.5	.5	.5	**.5**	**1.5**	11.0
Career	2 years, 1 team	8	8	27.9	.478	.400	.706	6.0	1.9	.6	.4	1.6	12.0

== See also ==
- List of Australian WNBA players
- WNBL Rookie of the Year Award
