= Shelley Sandie =

Australian basketball player

Personal information
- Born: 22 January 1969 (age 57)
Medal record
Women's Basketball
Representing Australia
Olympic Games
Bronze medal – third place	1996 Atlanta	Team competition
Silver medal – second place	2000 Sydney	Team competition

Shelley Ann Gorman-Sandie (born 22 January 1969 in Melbourne, Victoria) is a retired female basketball player from Australia, who played for the Canberra Capitals. A three-time Olympian she was a member of the national women's team that claimed the bronze medal at the 1996 Summer Olympics in Atlanta, Georgia. She attended the Australian Institute of Sport in 1987.

In 2010, Sandie was elected to the Australian Basketball Hall of Fame.

== See also ==
- WNBL Top Shooter Award
- WNBL All-Star Five
