= Rachael Sporn =

Australian basketball player (born 1968)

Personal information
- Born: 26 May 1968 (age 58) Murrayville, Victoria, Australia
- Listed height: 6 ft 1 in (1.85 m)
- Listed weight: 175 lb (79 kg)

Career information
- WNBA draft: 1998: 2nd round, 14th overall pick
- Drafted by: Detroit Shock
- Playing career: 1986–2004
- Position: Forward

Career history
- 1986–1989: West Adelaide Bearcats
- 1990–1991: North Adelaide Rockets
- 1992: West Adelaide Bearcats
- 1993–2004: Adelaide Lightning
- 1998–1999, 2001: Detroit Shock

Career highlights
- 5× WNBL champion (1990, 1994–1996, 1998); 2× WNBL Grand Final MVP (1994, 1995); 2× WNBL MVP (1996, 1997); 8× WNBL All-Star Five (1992–1997, 1999, 2002); WNBL Top Shooter Award (1997)
- Stats at Basketball Reference
Medals
Representing Australia
Olympic Games
Silver medal – second place	2004 Athens	National team
Silver medal – second place	2000 Sydney	National team
Bronze medal – third place	1996 Atlanta	National team
World Championships
Bronze medal – third place	1998 Germany	Team competition

Rachael Pamela Sporn OAM (born 26 May 1968) is an Australian former basketball player and three-time Olympian.

== Career ==
Born in Murrayville, Victoria, Sporn debuted in the Women's National Basketball League (WNBL) in 1986 with the West Adelaide Bearcats. After four seasons with the Bearcats, she joined the North Adelaide Rockets where she won her first WNBL championship in 1990. After two seasons with the Rockets, she returned for a season with the Bearcats in 1992 before joining the Adelaide Lightning in 1993.

Sporn played 12 seasons for the Adelaide Lightning between 1993 and 2004. She was twice named WNBL MVP and was an eight-time WNBL All-Star Five honouree. She finished her career as the WNBL's all-time points and rebounding leader. She also played three seasons for the Detroit Shock of the Women's National Basketball Association (WNBA).

Sporn played 304 games for the Australia women's national basketball team, the Opals, earning three Olympic Games medals – two silver medals (2000 and 2004) and a bronze (1996). She also competed at the World Championships in 1990, 1994 and 1998.

Sporn is a member of the Australian Sports Hall of Fame and the Australian Basketball Hall of Fame. She was awarded the Australian Sports Medal in 2000 and the Centenary Medal in 2001.

In 2007, Sporn's number 14 jersey was retired by the Adelaide Lightning. In September 2023, Sporn and the Lightning agreed to un-retired her jersey so Isobel Borlase could wear it. Sporn agreed to un-retire her number again in September 2026 so her niece Sienna Lehmann could wear it.

== Personal life ==
Sporn's older brother, Kieran, is a former Australian rules footballer.

Sporn and her husband, Maurie Ranger, have two children. As of 2019, they live in Adelaide.

In 2015, Sporn was awarded the Medal of the Order of Australia.

== Career statistics ==
Legend
GP	Games played	GS	Games started	MPG	Minutes per game	RPG	Rebounds per game
APG	Assists per game	SPG	Steals per game	BPG	Blocks per game	PPG	Points per game
TO	Turnovers per game	FG%	Field-goal percentage	3P%	3-point field-goal percentage	FT%	Free-throw percentage
**Bold**	Career best	°	League leader

=== WNBA ===
==== Regular season ====
Year	Team	GP	GS	MPG	FG%	3P%	FT%	RPG	APG	SPG	BPG	TO	PPG
1998	Detroit	**30**°	1	17.8	.408	–	.500	**3.6**	1.3	.3	**.4**	1.1	4.5
1999	Detroit	18	**10**	**18.9**	**.468**	.000	**.643**	3.3	**1.5**	**.8**	.2	.9	**5.9**
2001	Detroit	23	1	11.5	.404	–	.333	2.3	.5	.3	.2	**.6**	1.8
Career	3 years, 1 team	71	12	16.1	.427	.000	.536	3.1	1.1	.4	.3	.9	4.0
