= Robyn Maher =

Australian basketball player

Personal information
- Born: 6 October 1959 (age 67) Ballarat, Victoria, Australia
- Listed height: 178 cm (5 ft 10 in)
- Listed weight: 73 kg (11 st 7 lb; 161 lb)
- Position: Shooting guard

Career highlights
- 10× WNBL champion (1983, 1984, 1986–1989, 1991–1993, 1997); Australian Basketball Hall of Fame (2006); Sport Australia Hall of Fame (2018)
- FIBA Hall of Fame
Medals
Women's Basketball
Representing Australia
Olympic Games
Bronze medal – third place	1996 Atlanta	Team competition
World Championship
Bronze medal – third place	1998 Germany	Team competition

Robyn Maher AM (born 6 October 1959) is an Australian former basketball player. A three-time Olympian, she was a member of the national women's team that won the bronze medal at the 1996 Summer Olympics in Atlanta, Georgia. In the Women's National Basketball League, she played for the Nunawading Spectres, Hobart Islanders, Perth Breakers and Sydney Uni Flames.

Maher was appointed a Member of the Order of Australia (AM) in the 2002 Australia Day Honours in recognition of her "service to basketball as a player and administrator, and for the promotion of the sport among young people". In 2006, Maher was inducted into the Australian Basketball Hall of Fame. In October 2018, she was inducted into the Sport Australia Hall of Fame.

== Early life ==
Born in Ballarat, Victoria, Maher initially played tennis and netball but switched to basketball in primary school.

== WNBL career ==
Maher played 369 games in the Women's National Basketball League, featuring in 10 championships and 13 grand finals. With the Nunawading Spectres, she won six titles in seven years between 1983 and 1989 under coach and husband Tom Maher. With the Hobart Islanders in 1991, she was grand final MVP as she led the Islanders to a victory over her old Spectres team. Her and Tom reunited as a player/coach duo at the Perth Breakers in 1992 and won another championship. She completed a hat-trick of WNBL championships in 1993 with the Sydney Uni Flames. She won her tenth championship in 1997 with Sydney.

== Personal life ==
Maher's father is former Victorian Football League player Jim Gull. Her brother, Stewart Gull, also played in the VFL.

Maher's husband is former Opals coach Tom Maher.

== See also ==
- WNBL All-Star Five
- WNBL Defensive Player of the Year Award
