= Hobart Islanders =

Australian women's basketball team

- Leagues: WNBL
- Founded: 1986
- Dissolved: 1996
- History: Hobart Islanders; 1986–1996
- Arena: Kingborough Sports Centre
- Location: Hobart, Tasmania
- Team colors: Light blue, green, white
- Championships: 1 (1991)

The Hobart Islanders (also known as the Tassie Islanders) were an Australian professional basketball team based in Hobart, Tasmania. The Islanders competed in the Women's National Basketball League (WNBL) and played their home games at Kingborough Sports Centre.

== History ==
=== Hobart Hustlers (1984–1985) ===
In 1984, the Hobart Hustlers were inaugural champions of the Women's Basketball Conference (WBC). In 1985, the Hustlers finished third in the WBC.

=== Hobart Islanders (1986–1996) ===
The Hobart Islanders made their debut in the Women's National Basketball League (WNBL) in the 1986 season, finishing tenth with an 8–16 record. The Islanders finished tenth in 1987 with a 4–16 record and last in 1988 with a 0–22 record.

In 1989, the Islanders finished second with a 16–7 record and reached the WNBL Grand Final behind league MVP Kathy Foster, who averaged a league-leading 20.3 points per game. In the grand final, they lost 80–69 to the Nunawading Spectres. In 1990, the Islanders again finished second with a 19–5 record and returned to the WNBL Grand Final, where they lost 72–57 to the North Adelaide Rockets. In 1991, the Islanders finished first with an 18–4 record and reached their third straight WNBL Grand Final. In the grand final, Robyn Maher top scored with 19 points to lead the Islanders to their maiden WNBL championship with a 67–64 win over the Nunawading Spectres at Kingborough Sports Centre.

The Islanders dropped to eighth with a 7–13 record in 1992 before finishing on the bottom of the ladder each year between 1993 and 1995. In the 1996 WNBL season, they finish ninth with a 2–16 record.

Following the 1996 season, the Islanders were reportedly $45,000 in debt and relied on fundraising to remain operational. The club's financial difficulties contributed to a significant departure of players, and it folded three weeks before the start of the 1997 season.
