= Melbourne Tigers (NBL1 South) =

- Leagues: NBL1 South
- Founded: 1981
- History: Men: Melbourne Tigers; 1981–1983; 2004–present Women: Melbourne Tigers; 1989–present
- Arena: Melbourne Sports and Aquatic Centre
- Location: Melbourne, Victoria
- Team colors: Red, yellow, black
- Main sponsor: Western Union
- Head coach: M: Andrew Gaze; W: Kaleb Sclater
- Championships: Men: ABA (1): 1983; SEABL (1): 1983; Big V (2): 2008; 2009; Women: Big V (2): 2003; 2004
- Website: NBL1.com.au

Melbourne Tigers is a NBL1 South club based in Melbourne, Victoria. The club fields a team in both the Men's and Women's NBL1 South. The club is a division of Melbourne Central Basketball Association (MCBA), the major administrative basketball organisation south of Melbourne's Central Business District. The Tigers play their home games at Melbourne Sports and Aquatic Centre.

== Club history ==
=== Background ===
The Melbourne Tigers were established in 1931 with the birth of the Victorian Basketball Association (VBA). The Melbourne senior men's club began as St Lukes from North Fitzroy, where basketball games were played at St Lukes hall from 1924. The name of the club went through an evolution process where the club changed from St Lukes to Church of England, to becoming Church. It then became Melbourne Church and finally in 1975 the club decided to change its name to Melbourne Tigers. Considered Australian basketball's most famous club, the Tigers were founded by Ken Watson. Watson coached Tigers' senior teams from the 1940s to the 1970s.

The Junior Boys' Club originated from the Saturday night Church of England Boys' Society (CEBS) competition run at Albert Park Stadium, which began in 1959. Junior girls' basketball was not played until 1968. The CEBS competition folded in 1970, which led to the Melbourne Tigers Junior Basketball Association taking over competitions run at Albert Park. Watson was heavily involved in Tigers junior teams until the early 2000s.

In 2025, Melbourne Basketball Association (with roots dating back to 1931) merged with a number of associations and clubs to form Melbourne Central Basketball Association (MCBA).

=== Men's team ===
Between 1965 and 1970, Melbourne Church of England won the South Eastern Conference (SEC) championship every year. The league was abandoned in 1971.

In 1981, the Tigers were an inaugural team in the South East Australian Basketball League (SEABL). In 1982, they finished second on the SEABL ladder before going on to reach the ABA National grand final, where they lost to the Frankston Bears. In 1983, they finished first on the SEABL ladder to win the SEABL championship. They went on to reach the ABA National grand final, where they won the National championship with a victory over the Bulleen Boomers.

In 1984, the Melbourne Tigers NBL team was established and they debuted in the National Basketball League (NBL). The Tigers name continued in the NBL until the franchise rebranded as Melbourne United in 2014.

In 2004, a Tigers state league men's team joined the Big V Championship Division. In 2008 and 2009, the team won back-to-back Big V titles.

Following the 2015 season, the Tigers men's team left the Big V and returned to the SEABL in 2016 for the first time since 1983.

In 2019, following the demise of the SEABL, the Tigers men and women joined the NBL1 South.

In the 2025 NBL1 South season, the Tigers men reached the grand final, where they lost 99–80 to the Sandringham Sabres.

=== Women's team ===
The Melbourne Tigers played in the Women's National Basketball League (WNBL) between 1989 and 2001. They reached back-to-back WNBL grand finals in 1994 and 1995, finishing runners-up in both years. In 1992 and 1993, a Tigers women's team also competed in the Country Victorian Invitation Basketball League (CVIBL) Division One.

In 2002, the Tigers women's team joined the Big V Championship Division. In 2003 and 2004, the team won back-to-back Big V titles. In 2011 and 2012, the team lost back-to-back Big V grand final series to the Eltham Wildcats.

In 2017, the Tigers women's team joined the SEABL for the first time.
