= Brisbane Blazers =

Australian women's basketball team

- Leagues: WNBL
- Founded: 1982
- Dissolved: 1998
- History: Brisbane Comets; 1982; Brisbane Lady Bullets; 1983–1991; Brisbane Blazers; 1992–1998
- Arena: Auchenflower Stadium
- Location: Brisbane, Queensland
- Championships: 0

The Brisbane Blazers were an Australian professional basketball team based in Brisbane, Queensland. The Blazers competed in the Women's National Basketball League (WNBL) and played their home games at Auchenflower Stadium.

== History ==
In 1982, Brisbane Basketball Incorporated entered a team into the Women's National Basketball League (WNBL). The team debuted as the Brisbane Comets before changing to Brisbane Lady Bullets in 1983. In 1986, the Bullets reached the semi-finals for the first and only time. In 1992, the team name was changed to Brisbane Blazers. Brisbane Basketball relinquished their WNBL license in 1995 and the Blazers played their final WNBL season in 1998.
