= Australian Institute of Sport (WNBL team) =

Australian Institute of Sport (AIS)
- Nickname: Pumas
- Founded: 1981
- Dissolved: 2012
- History: Australian Institute of Sport; 1981–2012
- Arena: AIS Training Hall
- Team colours: Red, Blue, White
- Championships: 1 (1999)

The Australian Institute of Sport (AIS), known as AIS Pumas in the 1980s, competed in the Women's National Basketball League (WNBL) for 32 seasons. They were an inaugural team in the WNBL in 1981 and won a WNBL championship in the 1998–99 season.

After winning just eight games in four seasons, the team was withdrawn from the WNBL following the 2011–12 season. The withdrawal was coordinated with Basketball Australia, which sought to address the flagging depth in its female junior ranks.

== Notable players ==
- Liz Cambage
- Lauren Jackson
- Penny Taylor
- Deanna Smith

== WBC team ==
The program's second team, also known as the AIS Pumas, played in the second-tier Women's Basketball Conference (WBC) in the 1980s.
