= List of 2017–18 WNBL season signings =

2017–18 WNBL season

WNBL seasons
- ← 2016–17 2018–19 →

This is a list of all personnel changes that occurred during the 2017 Women's National Basketball League (WNBL) off-season and 2017–18 WNBL season.

== Incoming Movement ==
=== Returning ===
Team	Player	Nationality	Contract	Ref.
Townsville Fire	Darcee Garbin	Australia	existing	
Townsville Fire	Micaela Cocks	New Zealand	existing	
Canberra Capitals	Keely Froling	Australia	existing	
Sydney Uni Flames	Belinda Snell	Australia	existing	
Sydney Uni Flames	Shanae Greaves	Australia	existing	
Melbourne Boomers	Monique Conti	Australia	re-signing	
Melbourne Boomers	Brittany Smart	United States	re-signing	
Adelaide Lightning	Sarah Elsworthy	Australia	re-signing	
Melbourne Boomers	Madeleine Garrick	Australia	re-signing	
Melbourne Boomers	Rebecca Ott	Australia	re-signing	
Townsville Fire	Mia Murray	Australia	re-signing	
Melbourne Boomers	Rebecca Cole	Australia	re-signing	
Sydney Uni Flames	Alex Wilson	Australia	re-signing	
Perth Lynx	Sami Whitcomb	United States	re-signing	
Perth Lynx	Antonia Farnworth	New Zealand	re-signing	
Townsville Fire	Suzy Batkovic	Australia	re-signing	
Sydney Uni Flames	Tahlia Tupaea	Australia	re-signing	
Bendigo Spirit	Nadeen Payne	Australia	re-signing	
Dandenong Rangers	Sara Blicavs	Australia	re-signing	
Sydney Uni Flames	Jennifer Hamson	United States	re-signing	
Townsville Fire	Kelly Wilson	Australia	re-signing	
Dandenong Rangers	Stephanie Cumming	Australia	re-signing	
Canberra Capitals	Abigail Wehrung	Australia	re-signing	
Bendigo Spirit	Kelsey Griffin	Australia	re-signing	
Dandenong Rangers	Amelia Todhunter	Australia	re-signing	
Canberra Capitals	Kate Gaze	Australia	re-signing	
Sydney Uni Flames	Carly Boag	Australia	re-signing	
Adelaide Lightning	Laura Hodges	Australia	re-signing	
Bendigo Spirit	Gabrielle Richards	Australia	re-signing	
Bendigo Spirit	Kara Tessari	Australia	re-signing	
Townsville Fire	Haylee Andrews	Australia	re-signing	
Bendigo Spirit	Ashleigh Spencer	Australia	re-signing	
Bendigo Spirit	Heather Oliver	Australia	re-signing	
Bendigo Spirit	Ashleigh Karaitiana	Australia	re-signing	
Sydney Uni Flames	Sarah Graham	Australia	re-signing	
Bendigo Spirit	Ebony Rolph	Australia	re-signing	
Sydney Uni Flames	Asia Taylor	United States	re-signing	
Perth Lynx	Natalie Burton	Australia	re-signing	
Sydney Uni Flames	Cassidy McLean	Australia	re-signing	
Sydney Uni Flames	Lara McSpadden	Australia	re-signing	
Sydney Uni Flames	Susannah Walmsley	Australia	re-signing	

=== Incoming (Domestic) ===
New Team	Player	Nationality	Previous Team	Location	Ref.
Adelaide Lightning	Aimie Clydesdale	Australia	Dandenong	Australia	
Canberra Capitals	Lauren Scherf	Australia	Dandenong	Australia	
Adelaide Lightning	Natalie Novosel	United States	Dandenong	Australia	
Dandenong Rangers	Carley Mijović	Australia	Perth	Australia	
Perth Lynx	Alice Kunek	Australia	Melbourne	Australia	
Adelaide Lightning	Ruth Hamblin	Canada	Perth	Australia	
Adelaide Lightning	Lauren Nicholson	Australia	Sydney	Australia	
Dandenong Rangers	Tessa Lavey	Australia	Perth	Australia	
Perth Lynx	Olivia Thompson	Australia	Melbourne	Australia	
Perth Lynx	Kayla Standish	United States	Townsville	Australia	
Dandenong Rangers	Tayla Roberts	Australia	Adelaide	Australia	
Perth Lynx	Alex Ciabattoni	Australia	Adelaide	Australia	
Melbourne Boomers	Ashleigh Grant	Australia	Perth	Australia	
Canberra Capitals	Chevannah Paalvast	New Zealand	Townsville	Australia	
Townsville Fire	Marena Whittle	Australia	Nunawading	(Victoria (state)) Victoria	
Dandenong Rangers	Kiera Rowe	Australia	Centre of Excellence	Australian Capital Territory	
Dandenong Rangers	Rebecca Pizzey	Australia	Bulleen	(Victoria (state)) Victoria	
Townsville Fire	Zitina Aokuso	Australia	Centre of Excellence	Australian Capital Territory	
Canberra Capitals	Maddison Rocci	Australia	Centre of Excellence	Australian Capital Territory	
Melbourne Boomers	Courtney Duever	United States	Sunbury	(Victoria (state)) Victoria	
Townsville Fire	Miela Goodchild	Australia	Logan	Queensland	
Canberra Capitals	Eziyoda Magbegor	Australia	Centre of Excellence	Australian Capital Territory	
Townsville Fire	Mikhaela Donnelly	Australia	Logan	Queensland	

=== Incoming (International) ===
New Team	Player	Nationality	Previous Team	Location	Ref.
Melbourne Boomers	Jenna O'Hea	Australia	Seattle	United States	
Canberra Capitals	Rachel Jarry	Australia	Lattes	France	
Melbourne Boomers	Liz Cambage	Australia	Shanghai	China	
Adelaide Lightning	Abby Bishop	Australia	Tarbes	France	
Melbourne Boomers	Louella Tomlinson	Australia	Miskolc	Hungary	
Townsville Fire	Cayla George	Australia	Sopron	Hungary	
Adelaide Lightning	Nicole Seekamp	Australia	Gorzów Wielkopolski	Poland	
Dandenong Rangers	Kayla Pedersen	United States	Lucca	Italy	
Sydney Uni Flames	Katie-Rae Ebzery	Australia	Moscow	Russia	
Bendigo Spirit	Betnijah Laney	United States	Chicago	United States	
Canberra Capitals	Jordan Hooper	United States	İstanbul	Turkey	
Melbourne Boomers	Kalani Purcell	New Zealand	Brigham Young	United States	
Dandenong Rangers	Laia Palau	Spain	Prague	Czech Republic	
Townsville Fire	Sydney Wiese	United States	Oregon State	United States	
Canberra Capitals	Natalie Hurst	Australia	Hatay	Turkey	
Bendigo Spirit	Rachel Banham	United States	Connecticut	United States	
Adelaide Lightning	Vanessa Panousis	Australia	Virginia Tech	United States	
Canberra Capitals	Mistie Bass	United States	Phoenix	United States	
Townsville Fire	Laurin Mincy	United States	Rishon LeZion	Israel	
Perth Lynx	Courtney Williams	United States	Girne	Turkey	
Perth Lynx	Amanda Dowe	United States	Bretagne	France	

== Outgoing Movement ==
=== Going overseas ===
Previous Team	Player	Nationality	New Team	Location	Ref.
Dandenong Rangers	Chloe Bibby	Australia	Mississippi State	United States	
Adelaide Lightning	Anneli Maley	Australia	Oregon	United States	
Bendigo Spirit	Nayo Raincock-Ekunwe	Canada	Nantes	France	
Sydney Uni Flames	Leilani Mitchell	Australia	Hatay	Turkey	
Canberra Capitals	Marianna Tolo	Australia	Kayseri	Turkey	
Canberra Capitals	Jazmon Gwathmey	United States	Bucheon	South Korea	
Perth Lynx	Brianna Butler	United States	Zamarat	Spain	
Dandenong Rangers	Ally Malott	United States	Rīga	Latvia	

=== Retirement ===
Previous Team	Player	Nationality
Canberra Capitals	Carly Wilson	Australia
Dandenong Rangers	Jacinta Kennedy	Australia
