= List of 2019–20 WNBL season transactions =

This is a list of transactions that have taken place during the off-season and the 2019–20 WNBL season.

== Front office movements ==
=== Head coach changes ===
Off-season

Departure date	Team	Outgoing head coach	Reason for departure	Hire date	Incoming head coach	Last coaching position	Ref.
January 7	Sydney Uni Flames	(Australia) Cheryl Chambers	Did not seek contract renewal	March 5	(Australia) Katrina Hibbert	Basketball Victoria U/20	
January 23	Bendigo Spirit	(Australia) Simon Pritchard	Contract not renewed	February 22	(Australia) Tracy York	Adelaide 36ers assistant coach (2014–2019)	
February 5	Southside Flyers	(Australia) Larissa Anderson	Did not seek contract renewal	July 2	(Australia) Cheryl Chambers	Sydney Uni Flames head coach (2016–2019)	
May 16	Townsville Fire	(Canada) Claudia Brassard	Resigned	June 14	(Australia) Shannon Seebohm	Australian Opals assistant coach (2019)	

== Player movement ==
=== Free agency ===
Player	Date signed	New team	Former team	Ref
(New Zealand) Micaela Cocks	February 28	Townsville Fire		
(Australia) Marianna Tolo	March 7	Canberra Capitals		
(Australia) Alex Wilson	March 7	Sydney Uni Flames		
(Australia) Tahlia Tupaea	March 11	Sydney Uni Flames		
(United States) Rebecca Tobin	March 13	Bendigo Spirit		
(Australia) Lara McSpadden	March 15	Sydney Uni Flames		
(Australia) Lauren Nicholson	March 19	Adelaide Lightning		
(Australia) Tess Madgen	March 20	Townsville Fire		
(Australia) Stephanie Talbot	March 25	Adelaide Lightning	Melbourne Boomers	
(Canada) Kia Nurse	March 26	Canberra Capitals		
(United States) Natalie Novosel	April 2	Adelaide Lightning		
(Australia) Abigail Wehrung	April 2	Bendigo Spirit		
(Australia) Maddison Rocci	April 2	Canberra Capitals		
(Australia) Tessa Lavey	April 4	Bendigo Spirit	Dandenong Rangers	
(Belgium) Julie Vanloo	April 4	Townsville Fire	PEAC-Pécs (HUN)	
(United States) Alison Schwagmeyer	April 6	Perth Lynx		
(Australia) Nicole Seekamp	April 9	Adelaide Lightning		
(Australia) Nadeen Payne	April 9	Perth Lynx	Bendigo Spirit	
(Australia) Marena Whittle	April 9	Perth Lynx	Bendigo Spirit	
(Australia) Shyla Heal	April 11	Bendigo Spirit	Perth Lynx	
(Australia) Kelly Wilson	April 26	Bendigo Spirit	Canberra Capitals	
(Australia) Chelsea Brook	May 2	Adelaide Lightning		
(Australia) Carley Ernst	May 2	Bendigo Spirit	Dandenong Rangers	
(Australia) Kate Gaze	May 2	Townsville Fire	Canberra Capitals	
(United States) Ariel Atkins	May 3	Perth Lynx	Gorzów Wielkopolski (POL)	
(United States) Brianna Turner	May 7	Adelaide Lightning	Notre Dame Fighting Irish (USA)	
(Canada) Bridget Carleton	May 9	Townsville Fire	Iowa State Cyclones (USA)	
(Australia) Lauren Scherf	May 10	Sydney Uni Flames	Canberra Capitals	
(Australia) Gabrielle Richards	May 21	Bendigo Spirit	Bendigo Braves (VIC)	
(Australia) Sarah Graham	May 21	Sydney Uni Flames		
(United States) Jessica Kuster	May 30	Sydney Uni Flames	Ragusa (ITA)	
(Australia) Natalie Hurst	June 11	Adelaide Lightning	Bendigo Spirit	
(United States) Imani McGee-Stafford	June 13	Perth Lynx	Liaoning Flying Eagles (CHN)	
(Australia) Alex Delaney	June 19	Canberra Capitals	Sydney Uni Flames	
(Australia) Alicia Froling	June 20	Bendigo Spirit	SMU Mustangs (USA)	
(New Zealand) Stella Beck	June 22	Melbourne Boomers	Townsville Fire	
(New Zealand) Penina Davidson	June 23	Melbourne Boomers	Adelaide Lightning	
(Australia) Sarah Elsworthy	June 26	Adelaide Lightning	Werribee Devils (VIC)	
(United States) Colleen Planeta	June 27	Sydney Uni Flames	Adelaide Lightning	
(United States) Lindsay Allen	June 30	Melbourne Boomers		
(United States) Sophie Cunningham	June 30	Melbourne Boomers	Missouri Tigers (USA)	
(Australia) Shanae Greaves	July 1	Sydney Uni Flames		
(Australia) Abby Bishop	July 3	Townsville Fire	Atomerőmű KSC Szekszárd (HUN)	
(Australia) Madeleine O'Hehir	July 8	Sydney Uni Flames		
(New Zealand) Antonia Farnworth	July 18	Melbourne Boomers	Perth Lynx	
(Australia) Laura Hodges	July 30	Adelaide Lightning		
(Australia) Jenna O'Hea	July 31	Southside Flyers	Melbourne Boomers	
(Australia) Kara Tessari	August 8	Bendigo Spirit		
(Australia) Kasey Burton	August 9	Bendigo Spirit	Melbourne Tigers (VIC)	
(Australia) Isabella Stratford	August 9	Bendigo Spirit	South Adelaide Panthers (SA)	
(Australia) Hannah Kaser	August 12	Adelaide Lightning	Canberra Nationals (ACT)	
(Australia) Sara Blicavs	August 12	Southside Flyers	Dandenong Rangers	
(Australia) Rebecca Cole	August 12	Southside Flyers	Dandenong Rangers	
(Australia) Louella Tomlinson	August 12	Southside Flyers	Bendigo Spirit	
(United States) Martè Grays	August 14	Bendigo Spirit	DePaul Blue Demons (USA)	
(France) Olivia Époupa	August 14	Canberra Capitals	Beşiktaş (TUR)	
(Australia) Aimie Clydesdale	August 15	Southside Flyers	Adelaide Lightning	
(Australia) Alice Kunek	August 23	Sydney Uni Flames	Energa Toruń (POL)	
(United States) Crystal Langhorne	August 26	Adelaide Lightning	Seattle Storm (USA)	
(Australia) Stephanie Reid	August 27	Southside Flyers	Dandenong Rangers	
(Australia) Anneli Maley	August 28	Southside Flyers	TCU Horned Frogs (USA)	
(Australia) Kim Hodge	August 28	Sydney Uni Flames	Manly Warringah Sea Eagles (NSW)	
(Australia) Demi Skinner	August 29	Bendigo Spirit	Toowoomba Mountaineers (QLD)	
(Australia) Abby Cubillo	August 29	Canberra Capitals		
(Australia) Alison Ebzery	August 29	Townsville Fire	Newcastle Hunters (NSW)	
(Australia) Aliza Fabbro	August 29	Townsville Fire	Townsville Flames (QLD)	
(Australia) Hannah Young	August 29	Townsville Fire	Canberra Capitals	
(Australia) Leilani Mitchell	August 31	Southside Flyers	Canberra Capitals	
(Australia) Kiera Rowe	September 1	Southside Flyers	Dandenong Rangers	
(Australia) Rebecca Pizzey	September 4	Southside Flyers	Dandenong Rangers	
(United States) Mikaela Ruef	September 5	Canberra Capitals	Logan Thunder (QLD)	
(United States) Mercedes Russell	September 8	Southside Flyers	Wisła Kraków (POL)	
(Australia) Tayah Burrows	September 9	Perth Lynx		
(Australia) Jewel Williams	September 9	Perth Lynx	Kalamunda Eastern Suns (WA)	
(Australia) Nes'eya Williams	September 9	Perth Lynx		
(Australia) Gemma Potter	September 10	Canberra Capitals	Centre of Excellence (ACT)	
(Australia) Rachel Brewster	September 12	Melbourne Boomers	Utah State Aggies (USA)	
(Australia) Paige Price	September 12	Melbourne Boomers	Centre of Excellence (ACT)	
(Australia) Christina Boag	September 16	Townsville Fire	Rockingham Flames (WA)	
(Australia) Shakera Riley	September 25	Canberra Capitals	Maitland Mustangs (NSW)	
(Australia) Pyper Thornberry	September 25	Canberra Capitals	Canberra Nationals (ACT)	
(Australia) Maddison Wheatley	September 25	Canberra Capitals	Canberra Nationals (ACT)	
(Australia) Lily Scanlon	October 2	Canberra Capitals	Centre of Excellence (ACT)	
(United States) Teige Morrell	October 18	Bendigo Spirit	Woodville Warriors (SA)	
(United States) Kathryn Westbeld	November 17	Adelaide Lightning	Atenienses de Manatí (PUR)	

=== Released ===
Player	Date	Former team	Reason	Ref
(United States) Natalie Novosel	July 16	Adelaide Lightning	ACL injury	
(Australia) Alicia Froling	September 13	Bendigo Spirit	Injury	
(Australia) Zitina Aokuso	September 19	Townsville Fire	ACL injury	
(United States) Crystal Langhorne	November 17	Adelaide Lightning	Knee injury	
(United States) Rebecca Tobin	December 12	Bendigo Spirit	Personal	
(United States) Mikaela Ruef	January 14	Canberra Capitals	Immigration issues	
(United States) Imani McGee-Stafford	January 14	Perth Lynx	Disciplinary	

=== Going overseas ===
Player	Date signed	New team	Former team	Ref
(Australia) Jazmin Shelley	October 15	Oregon Ducks (USA)	Melbourne Boomers	
(Australia) Jessie Rennie	April 18	Tennessee Lady Volunteers (USA)	Bendigo Spirit	
(United States) Brittany McPhee	July 5	CD Zamarat (ESP)	Perth Lynx	
(Australia) Vanessa Panousis	July 22	Niki Lefkadas (GRE)	Sydney Uni Flames	
(United States) Barbara Turner	August 7	Çankaya (TUR)	Bendigo Spirit	
(Canada) Kayla Alexander	August 11	Çukurova (TUR)	Adelaide Lightning	
(United States) Nia Coffey	August 14	Çukurova (TUR)	Adelaide Lightning	
(United States) Sarah Boothe	September 1	OA Chania (GRE)	Melbourne Boomers	
(United States) Asia Taylor	October 12	Explosivas de Moca (PUR)	Perth Lynx	

=== Retirement ===
Name	Date	Team(s) played (years)	Notes	Ref.
(Australia) Suzy Batkovic	September 26	Australian Institute of Sport (1996–1999); Sydney Uni Flames (1999–2001, 2009–10); Townsville Fire (2001–02); Canberra Capitals (2010–11); Adelaide Lightning (2011–2013); Townsville Fire (2013–2019)	5x WNBL champion (1999, 2001, 2015, 2016, 2018); 6x WNBL Most Valuable Player (2012–2014, 2016–2018); 7x WNBL All-Star Five (2010, 2012–2014, 2016–2018); WNBL Grand Final Most Valuable Player (2018); Also played overseas in the WNBA, France, Spain, Russia & Italy.	
(Australia) Belinda Snell	October 25	Australian Institute of Sport (1998–2000); Sydney Uni Flames (2000–2006, 2011–12); Bendigo Spirit (2014–2016); Sydney Uni Flames (2016–2019)	3x WNBL champion (1999, 2001, 2017); 4x WNBL All-Star Five (2001, 2004, 2005, 2012); Also played overseas in the WNBA, Italy, France, Russia, Spain & Poland.	
(United States) Kayla Pedersen	January 18	Dandenong Rangers (2013–14, 2017–2019)	WNBL Defensive Player of the Year (2018); Played college basketball, in the WNBA, Slovakia, Turkey & Italy.	

== See also ==
- List of 2019–20 WNBL team rosters
