= List of 2018–19 WNBL season transactions =

This is a list of transactions that have taken place during the off-season and the 2018–19 WNBL season.

== Front office movements ==
=== Head coach changes ===
Off-season

Departure date	Team	Outgoing head coach	Reason for departure	Hire date	Incoming head coach	Last coaching position	Ref.
NA							

== Player movement ==
=== Free agency ===
Player	Date signed	New team	Former team	Ref
(Australia) Suzy Batkovic	February 5	Townsville Fire		
(New Zealand) Micaela Cocks	February 18	Townsville Fire		
(Australia) Tess Madgen	February 21	Townsville Fire	AZS UMCS Lublin (POL)	
(United States) Brittany Smart	March 6	Sydney Uni Flames	Melbourne Boomers	
(Australia) Abigail Wehrung	March 8	Bendigo Spirit	Canberra Capitals	
(Australia) Kelsey Griffin	March 8	Canberra Capitals	Bendigo Spirit	
(Australia) Tahlia Tupaea	March 9	Sydney Uni Flames		
(Australia) Kate Gaze	March 13	Adelaide Lightning	Canberra Capitals	
(Australia) Lauren Mansfield	March 13	Perth Lynx	Energa Toruń (POL)	
(Australia) Lara McSpadden	March 14	Sydney Uni Flames		
(Australia) Jazmin Shelley	March 16	Melbourne Boomers	Southern Peninsula Sharks (VIC)	
(Australia) Belinda Snell	March 16	Sydney Uni Flames		
(Australia) Cayla George	March 17	Melbourne Boomers	Townsville Fire	
(Australia) Madeleine Garrick	March 18	Melbourne Boomers		
(Australia) Stephanie Talbot	March 19	Melbourne Boomers	USO Mondeville (FRA)	
(Australia) Shanae Greaves	March 19	Sydney Uni Flames		
(Australia) Leilani Mitchell	March 23	Canberra Capitals	Hatay (TUR)	
(Australia) Alex Wilson	March 26	Sydney Uni Flames		
(Australia) Eziyoda Magbegor	March 27	Melbourne Boomers	Canberra Capitals	
(Australia) Keely Froling	March 29	Canberra Capitals		
(Australia) Zitina Aokuso	April 3	Townsville Fire		
(United States) Laurin Mincy	April 11	Townsville Fire		
(Australia) Nadeen Payne	April 13	Bendigo Spirit		
(Australia) Maddison Rocci	April 17	Canberra Capitals		
(Australia) Mikhaela Donnelly	April 17	Townsville Fire		
(Australia) Marianna Tolo	April 19	Canberra Capitals	AGÜ Spor (TUR)	
(United States) Lindsay Allen	April 19	Melbourne Boomers	Dynamo Moscow (RUS)	
(Australia) Natalie Hurst	April 24	Bendigo Spirit	Canberra Capitals	
(Australia) Stephanie Blicavs	May 1	Adelaide Lightning	Dandenong Rangers	
(Australia) Marena Whittle	May 2	Bendigo Spirit	Townsville Fire	
(Australia) Kristy Wallace	May 3	Canberra Capitals	Baylor Lady Bears (USA)	
(Australia) Alex Bunton	May 7	Sydney Uni Flames	Dynamo Moscow (RUS)	
(Australia) Kara Tessari	May 9	Bendigo Spirit		
(Australia) Sara Blicavs	May 11	Dandenong Rangers		
(United States) Kayla Pedersen	May 15	Dandenong Rangers		
(United States) Rebecca Tobin	May 16	Bendigo Spirit	TSV 1880 Wasserburg (GER)	
(Australia) Rebecca Cole	May 17	Dandenong Rangers	Melbourne Boomers	
(Australia) Casey Samuels	May 18	Townsville Fire	North Gold Coast Seahawks (QLD)	
(Canada) Kayla Alexander	May 21	Adelaide Lightning	Indiana Fever (USA)	
(United States) Nia Coffey	May 21	Adelaide Lightning	Maccabi Ramat Hen (ISR)	
(Australia) Cassidy McLean	May 21	Bendigo Spirit	Sydney Uni Flames	
(Australia) Tayla Roberts	May 28	Dandenong Rangers		
(Australia) Isobel Anstey	May 29	Melbourne Boomers	Dandenong Rangers (VIC)	
(Australia) Lara Edmanson	May 29	Melbourne Boomers	Hawthorn Magic (VIC)	
(Australia) Rachel Jarry	June 1	Dandenong Rangers	Canberra Capitals	
(Australia) Jade Melbourne	June 1	Melbourne Boomers	Latrobe City Energy (VIC)	
(United States) Asia Taylor	June 6	Perth Lynx	Sydney Uni Flames	
(Australia) Louella Tomlinson	June 8	Bendigo Spirit	Melbourne Boomers	
(Australia) Carley Mijović	June 8	Dandenong Rangers		
(Australia) Maddison Allen	June 8	Perth Lynx	Rockingham Flames (WA)	
(New Zealand) Antonia Farnworth	June 14	Perth Lynx		
(United States) Alison Schwagmeyer	June 14	Perth Lynx		
(United States) Kayla Standish	June 14	Perth Lynx		
(Australia) Katie-Rae Ebzery	June 15	Perth Lynx	Sydney Uni Flames	
(Australia) Nicole Seekamp	June 18	Adelaide Lightning		
(Australia) Lauren Nicholson	June 19	Adelaide Lightning		
(New Zealand) Stella Beck	June 19	Townsville Fire	Saint Mary's Gaels (USA)	
(United States) Colleen Planeta	June 20	Adelaide Lightning		
(Australia) Chelsea Brook	June 21	Adelaide Lightning		
(Australia) Kelly Wilson	June 22	Canberra Capitals	Townsville Fire	
(Canada) Jamie Scott	July 5	Bendigo Spirit	Universitario de Ferrol (ESP)	
(Australia) Shyla Heal	July 5	Perth Lynx	Sutherland Sharks (NSW)	
(United States) Amanda Johnson	July 6	Sydney Uni Flames	Ipswich Force (QLD)	
(Australia) Olivia Pollerd	July 10	Melbourne Boomers	BA Centre of Excellence (ACT)	
(Australia) Alexandra Fowler	July 10	Townsville Fire	Townsville Flames (QLD)	
(New Zealand) Penina Davidson	July 17	Adelaide Lightning	California Golden Bears (USA)	
(Australia) Maddison Wild	July 25	Bendigo Spirit		
(Australia) Hannah Young	July 25	Canberra Capitals	SCM Timișoara (ROU)	
(United States) Sarah Boothe	July 25	Melbourne Boomers	Montana 2003 (BUL)	
(Australia) Sarah Graham	August 2	Sydney Uni Flames		
(Canada) Kia Nurse	August 9	Canberra Capitals	Connecticut Huskies (USA)	
(United States) Kaela Davis	August 10	Perth Lynx	Galatasaray S.K. (TUR)	
(Australia) Vanessa Panousis	August 15	Sydney Uni Flames	Adelaide Lightning	
(Australia) Amelia Todhunter	August 20	Dandenong Rangers		
(United States) Kaili McLaren	August 21	Canberra Capitals	Bornova (TUR)	
(Australia) Bianca Dufelmeier	August 22	Bendigo Spirit	Bendigo Braves (VIC)	
(Australia) Caitlin McLachlan	August 22	Bendigo Spirit	Bendigo Braves (VIC)	
(New Zealand) Josephine Stockill	August 23	Melbourne Boomers	Sunbury Jets (VIC)	
(Australia) Stephanie Reid	August 24	Dandenong Rangers	Buffalo Bulls (USA)	
(Australia) Courtenay Wragg	August 27	Bendigo Spirit	Melbourne Boomers	
(United States) Ally Malott	August 28	Townsville Fire	TTT Riga (LAT)	
(Australia) Ellie Collins	September 3	Perth Lynx	Launceston Tornadoes (TAS)	
(Australia) Susannah Walmsley	September 5	Sydney Uni Flames		
(Australia) Mikayla Pirini	September 7	Adelaide Lightning	Perth Lynx	
(Australia) Ashley Taia	September 7	Adelaide Lightning	Indiana State Sycamores (USA)	
(United States) Brittany McPhee	September 12	Perth Lynx	Stanford Cardinal (USA)	
(Australia) Ruby Porter	September 18	Adelaide Lightning	Sturt Sabres (SA)	
(Australia) Taylah Gilliam	September 21	Dandenong Rangers		
(Australia) Saraid Taylor	September 21	Dandenong Rangers		
(Australia) Briahna Whatman	September 21	Dandenong Rangers	Diamond Valley Eagles (VIC)	
(United States) Barbara Turner	October 18	Bendigo Spirit	Hatay (TUR)	

=== Released ===
Player	Date	Former team	Ref
(United States) Kaela Davis	September 4	Perth Lynx	
(Canada) Jamie Scott	October 18	Bendigo Spirit	

=== Going overseas ===
Player	Date signed	New team	Former team	Ref
(Australia) Callie Bourne	November 27	Idaho State Bengals (USA)	Canberra Capitals	
(Australia) Miela Goodchild	March 15	Duke Blue Devils (USA)	Townsville Fire	
(Australia) Ahlise Hurst	April 12	New Mexico Lobos (USA)	Bendigo Spirit	
(Australia) Haylee Andrews	March 15	Portland Pilots (USA)	Townsville Fire	
(Spain) Laia Palau	May 10	Uni Girona CB (ESP)	Dandenong Rangers	
(Canada) Ruth Hamblin	May 25	BC Castors Braine (BEL)	Adelaide Lightning	
(Australia) Sami Whitcomb	May 30	Basket Lattes (FRA)	Perth Lynx	
(United States) Jordan Hooper	June 13	Elitzur Holon (ISR)	Canberra Capitals	
(Australia) Alice Kunek	August 12	Energa Toruń (POL)	Perth Lynx	
(Australia) Jessica Good	August 18	Sevenoaks Suns (GBR)	Adelaide Lightning	
(Australia) Alex Ciabattoni	August 28	Venezia (ITA)	Perth Lynx	
(Australia) Natalie Burton	August 31	Herner TC (GER)	Perth Lynx	
(Australia) Abby Bishop	September 1	KSC Szekszárd (HUN)	Adelaide Lightning	
(United States) Sydney Wiese	September 5	Ramat Hasharon (ISR)	Townsville Fire	

=== Retirement ===
Name	Date	Team(s) played (years)	Notes	Ref.
(Australia) Heather Oliver	June 15	Bendigo Spirit (2010–2018)	WNBL champion (2014); Also played college basketball in the US	

== See also ==
- List of 2018–19 WNBL team rosters
