= 2017–18 Bendigo Spirit season =

- Head Coach: Simon Pritchard
- Captain: Kelsey Griffin
- Venue: Bendigo Stadium

Results
- Record: 4–17
- Ladder: 8th
- Finals: Did not qualify

Leaders
- Points: Laney (14.6)
- Rebounds: Richards (6.8)
- Assists: Laney (3.8)

The 2017–18 Bendigo Spirit season is the 11th season for the franchise in the Women's National Basketball League (WNBL).

== Roster ==
2017–18 Bendigo Spirit roster
Players
Coaches

Pos.	No.	Nat.	Name	Ht.
G	1	(United States)	Banham, Rachel	1.75 m (5 ft 9 in)
G	3	(Australia)	Tessari, Kara	1.65 m (5 ft 5 in)
G	7	(Australia)	Oliver, Heather	1.78 m (5 ft 10 in)
G	8	(Australia)	Hurst, Ahlise	1.71 m (5 ft 7 in)
F	11	(Australia)	Spencer, Ashleigh	1.83 m (6 ft 0 in)
F	12	(Australia)	Payne, Nadeen	1.88 m (6 ft 2 in)
G	15	(Australia)	Rennie, Jessie	1.70 m (5 ft 7 in)
F	20	(Australia)	Richards, Gabrielle	1.88 m (6 ft 2 in)
F	21	(Australia)	Rolph, Ebony	1.80 m (5 ft 11 in)
F	22	(New Zealand)	Karaitiana, Ashleigh	1.80 m (5 ft 11 in)
F	23	(Australia)	Griffin, Kelsey (injured) (C)	1.88 m (6 ft 2 in)
F	34	(Australia)	Wild, Maddison	1.90 m (6 ft 3 in)
G/F	44	(United States)	Laney, Betnijah	1.80 m (5 ft 11 in)

Head coach

- (Australia) Simon Pritchard

Assistant coach(es)

- (Australia) David Flint
- (Australia) Megan Moody

Legend

- (C) Team captain
- (DP) Development player
- (I) Import player
- Injured

- Roster
Updated: 21 December 2017

== Standings ==
#	WNBL Championship ladder				
#	Team	W	L	PCT	GP
1	Perth Lynx	15	6	71.4	21
2	Sydney Uni Flames	14	7	66.6	21
3	Townsville Fire	14	7	66.6	21
4	Melbourne Boomers	12	9	57.1	21
5	Adelaide Lightning	11	10	52.3	21
6	Canberra Capitals	7	14	33.3	21
7	Dandenong Rangers	7	14	33.3	21
8	Bendigo Spirit	4	17	19.1	21

== Results ==
=== Pre-season ===
Game	Date	Team	Score	High points	High rebounds	High assists	Location	Record
1	September; 16	Adelaide	74–76	–	–	–	Boardman Stadium	0–1
2	September; 17	Dandenong	68–62	–	–	–	Eagle Stadium	1–1
3	September; 22	Melbourne	73–72	Banham (22)	Laney (11)	Karaitiana (4)	MARS Minerdome	2–1

=== Regular season ===
Game	Date	Team	Score	High points	High rebounds	High assists	Location	Record
1	October; 6	@ Canberra	80–93	Griffin (22)	Oliver (8)	Banham (4)	National Convention Centre	0–1
2	October; 13	@ Melbourne	63–90	Payne (16)	Laney (7)	Karaitiana, Laney, Rolph (2)	Geelong Arena	0–2
3	October; 14	Perth	123–65	Laney (27)	Griffin (8)	Laney (9)	Bendigo Stadium	1–2
4	October; 19	@ Perth	79–106	Griffin (22)	Griffin (11)	Banham, Rolph (3)	Bendat Basketball Centre	1–3
5	October; 21	@ Adelaide	75–79	Richards (22)	Griffin (16)	Karaitiana (6)	Titanium Security Arena	1–4
6	October; 27	Adelaide	66–79	Payne (17)	Griffin (8)	Banham (4)	Bendigo Stadium	1–5
7	November; 4	Melbourne	71–66	Banham (17)	Griffin (8)	Banham, Laney (4)	Bendigo Stadium	2–5
8	November; 9	Sydney	75–105	Banham (21)	Oliver (7)	Laney (8)	Bendigo Stadium	2–6
9	November; 11	@ Townsville	59–94	Laney (17)	Laney (10)	Laney, Spencer (2)	Townsville RSL Stadium	2–7
10	November; 17	Perth	59–83	Richards (14)	Richards (13)	Richards (3)	Bendigo Stadium	2–8
11	November; 19	@ Dandenong	70–80	Laney (17)	Richards (11)	Payne (5)	Traralgon Sports Stadium	2–9
12	November; 25	Canberra	83–80	Laney (23)	Richards (7)	Laney (6)	State Basketball Centre	3–9
13	December; 2	Dandenong	67–75	Laney (18)	Richards (8)	Oliver (5)	Bendigo Stadium	3–10
14	December; 7	@ Melbourne	42–86	Laney (16)	Payne (12)	Laney (5)	State Basketball Centre	3–11
15	December; 10	Townsville	62–99	Hurst (15)	Laney (7)	Laney, Richards (3)	Bendigo Stadium	3–12
16	December; 14	Canberra	80–91	Banham (20)	Richards (10)	Banham (6)	Bendigo Stadium	3–13
17	December; 16	@ Sydney	57–90	Laney (15)	Richards (7)	Laney, Payne (4)	Brydens Stadium	3–14
18	December; 21	Dandenong	64–47	Banham, Payne (16)	Richards (10)	Karaitiana, Laney, Payne (4)	Bendigo Stadium	4–14
19	December; 23	@ Townsville	62–120	Banham (16)	Banham, Karaitiana, Spencer (4)	Richards (3)	Townsville RSL Stadium	4–15
20	December; 29	@ Adelaide	74–87	Laney (20)	Richards (10)	Payne (4)	Titanium Security Arena	4–16
21	December; 31	Sydney	63–75	Banham (17)	Laney (10)	Laney (4)	Bendigo Stadium	4–17

== Signings ==
=== Returning ===
Player	Signed	Contract
Nadeen Payne	28 April 2017	1-year contract
Kelsey Griffin	18 May 2017	1-year contract
Gabrielle Richards	21 June 2017	1-year contract
Kara Tessari	28 June 2017	1-year contract
Ashleigh Spencer	5 July 2017	1-year contract
Heather Oliver	12 July 2017	1-year contract
Ashleigh Karaitiana	19 July 2017	1-year contract
Ebony Rolph	26 July 2017	1-year contract

=== Incoming ===
Player	Signed	Contract
Betnijah Laney	27 April 2017	1-year contract
Rachel Banham	8 May 2017	1-year contract
Ahlise Hurst	9 August 2017	1-year development player contract
Jessie Rennie	9 August 2017	1-year development player contract
Maddison Wild	9 August 2017	1-year development player contract

== Awards ==
=== In-season ===
Award	Recipient	Round(s) / Date	Ref.
Team of the Week	Nadeen Payne	Round 2	
Team of the Week	Rachel Banham	Round 5	
Team of the Week	Betnijah Laney	Round 8	
