= 2013 WNBL Finals =

Team	Coach	Wins
Bendigo Spirit	Bernie Harrower	1
Townsville Fire	Chris Lucas	0
- Dates: 23 February – 10 March 2013
- MVP: Kelsey Griffin (Bendigo)
- Preliminary final: Townsville def. Dandenong, 1–0

The 2013 WNBL Finals was the postseason tournament of the WNBL's 2012–13 season. The Dandenong Rangers were the defending champions but were defeated in the preliminary final by Townsville.

== Standings ==
#	WNBL Championship Ladder				
#	Team	W	L	PCT	GP
1	Bendigo Spirit	21	3	87.5	24
2	Dandenong Rangers	19	5	79.2	24
3	Adelaide Lightning	18	6	75.0	24
4	Townsville Fire	13	11	54.2	24
5	Bulleen Boomers	10	14	41.7	24
6	Logan Thunder	8	16	33.3	24
7	Sydney Uni Flames	8	16	33.3	24
8	Canberra Capitals	7	17	29.2	24
9	West Coast Waves	4	20	16.7	24

== Bracket ==
Semifinals
Bendigo Spirit	78
Dandenong Rangers	71
Adelaide Lightning	53
Townsville Fire	60

Preliminary final
Dandenong Rangers	64
Townsville Fire	78

Grand final
Bendigo Spirit	71
Townsville Fire	57

== Semi-finals ==
=== (1) Bendigo Spirit vs. (2) Dandenong Rangers ===
23 February 2013

Boxscore

Bendigo Spirit	78–71	Dandenong Rangers
Pts: K. Wilson 21; Rebs: Griffin 14; Asts: Harrower 9		Pts: O'Hea 23; Rebs: O'Hea 12; Asts: O'Hea 7

Bendigo Stadium, Bendigo, Victoria

=== (3) Adelaide Lightning vs. (4) Townsville Fire ===
23 February 2013

Boxscore

Adelaide Lightning	53–60	Townsville Fire
Scoring by quarter: 11–14, 16–16, 14–15, 12–15
Pts: Batkovic 15; Rebs: Hill 8 Asts: Batkovic, Marino 3		Pts: Flanagan 17; Rebs: Adair 9 Asts: Cocks, Foley 4

Adelaide Arena, Adelaide, South Australia

== Preliminary final ==
=== (2) Dandenong Rangers vs. (4) Townsville Fire ===
3 March 2013

Boxscore

Dandenong Rangers	64–78	Townsville Fire
Pts: Cumming 11; Rebs: O'Hea 9 Asts: MacLeod, O'Hea 3		Pts: Cocks 20; Rebs: Adair 12; Asts: Foley 4

Dandenong Stadium, Melbourne, Victoria

== Grand Final ==
=== (1) Bendigo Spirit vs. (4) Townsville Fire ===
10 March 2013

Boxscore

Bendigo Spirit	71–57	Townsville Fire
Pts: Griffin, Richards 20; Rebs: Griffin 11; Asts: Harrower, K. Wilson 5		Pts: Adair, Foley 11; Rebs: Adair 10; Asts: Cocks 3

Bendigo Stadium, Bendigo, Victoria
Attendance: 2,800

=== Rosters ===
2012–13 Bendigo Spirit roster
Players
Coaches

Pos.	No.	Nat.	Name	Ht.
G	5	(Australia)	Wilson, Andrea	1.73 m (5 ft 8 in)
G	6	(Australia)	Perera, Chantella	1.74 m (5 ft 9 in)
G	7	(Australia)	Camino, Renae	1.78 m (5 ft 10 in)
G/F	8	(Australia)	Munro, Hayley	1.85 m (6 ft 1 in)
G	9	(Australia)	Garrick, Madeleine	1.78 m (5 ft 10 in)
G	10	(Australia)	Harrower, Kristi (C)	1.62 m (5 ft 4 in)
F	14	(Canada)	Aubry, Chelsea	1.88 m (6 ft 2 in)
F/C	20	(Australia)	Richards, Gabrielle	1.88 m (6 ft 2 in)
G	22	(Australia)	Wilson, Kelly	1.70 m (5 ft 7 in)
F	23	(United States)	Griffin, Kelsey	1.88 m (6 ft 2 in)
G	24	(Australia)	Chalmers, Jane	1.63 m (5 ft 4 in)
C	33	(Australia)	Herrick, Rachel	1.92 m (6 ft 4 in)

Head coach

- (Australia) Bernie Harrower

Legend

- (C) Team captain
- (DP) Development player
- (I) Import player
- Injured

2012–13 Townsville Fire roster
Players
Coaches

Pos.	No.	Nat.	Name	Ht.
C	1	(United States)	Adair, Jessica	1.93 m (6 ft 4 in)
G	5	(Australia)	Flanagan, Rachael (C)	1.70 m (5 ft 7 in)
G/F	6	(Australia)	Bowen, Kelly	1.82 m (6 ft 0 in)
F	8	(Australia)	Thompson, Olivia	1.85 m (6 ft 1 in)
G	10	(Australia)	Newley, Mia	1.88 m (6 ft 2 in)
F	12	(United States)	Standish, Kayla	1.87 m (6 ft 2 in)
G	14	(Australia)	Romeo, Nicole	1.67 m (5 ft 6 in)
F	22	(Australia)	Gallagher, Cherie	1.80 m (5 ft 11 in)
G	24	(Australia)	Foley, Jess	1.82 m (6 ft 0 in)
G	32	(New Zealand)	Cocks, Micaela	1.74 m (5 ft 9 in)

Head coach

- (Australia) Chris Lucas

Legend

- (C) Team captain
- (DP) Development player
- (I) Import player
- Injured
