= 2015 WNBL Finals =

2015 women's basketball finals

Team	Coach	Wins
Townsville Fire	Chris Lucas	1
Bendigo Spirit	Bernie Harrower	0
- Dates: 21 February – 8 March 2015
- MVP: Mia Newley (TSV)
- Preliminary final: Bendigo def. Sydney, 1–0

The 2015 WNBL Finals was the postseason tournament of the WNBL's 2014–15 season. The Bendigo Spirit were the two-time defending champions, however they were defeated in the Grand Final by the Townsville Fire. The 2014–15 WNBL Championship was Townsville's first title.

== Standings ==
#	WNBL Championship Ladder				
#	Team	W	L	PCT	GP
1	Townsville Fire	17	5	77.27	22
2	Bendigo Spirit	15	7	68.18	22
3	Dandenong Rangers	12	10	54.55	22
4	Sydney Uni Flames	11	11	50.00	22
5	Canberra Capitals	11	11	50.00	22
6	Melbourne Boomers	11	11	50.00	22
7	Adelaide Lightning	7	15	31.82	22
8	West Coast Waves	4	18	18.18	22

== Bracket ==
Semifinals
22 February – Townsville RSL Stadium
Townsville Fire	82
Bendigo Spirit	63
21 February – Dandenong Basketball Stadium
Dandenong Rangers	80
Sydney Uni Flames	89

Preliminary final
1 March – Bendigo Stadium
Bendigo Spirit	85
Sydney Uni Flames	77

Grand final
8 March – Townsville RSL Stadium
Townsville Fire	75
Bendigo Spirit	65

== Semi-finals ==
=== (1) Townsville Fire vs. (2) Bendigo Spirit ===
22 February 2015
2:00PM (AEST)

Boxscore

Townsville Fire	82–63	Bendigo Spirit
Scoring by quarter: 26–16, 12–23, 22–7, 22–17
Pts: Francis 20; Rebs: Francis 14; Asts: McCully 10		Pts: Griffin 21; Rebs: Griffin 9 Asts: Oliver 3

Townsville RSL Stadium, Townsville, Queensland
Referees: Toni Caldwell, Sean Myers

=== (3) Dandenong Rangers vs. (4) Sydney Uni Flames ===
21 February 2015
3:00PM (AEDT)

Boxscore

Dandenong Rangers	80–89	Sydney Uni Flames
Scoring by quarter: 26–20, 23–16, 13–21, 18–32
Pts: Pondexter 27; Rebs: Taylor 7 Asts: Pondexter, Taylor 3		Pts: Cox 24; Rebs: Ruef 9 Asts: Mitchell 4

Dandenong Stadium, Melbourne, Victoria
Referees: Scott Brown, Peter Houghton, Sarah Carey

== Preliminary final ==
=== (2) Bendigo Spirit vs. (4) Sydney Uni Flames ===
1 March 2015
3:00PM (AEDT)

Boxscore

Bendigo Spirit	85–77	Sydney Uni Flames
Scoring by quarter: 33–24, 20–26, 17–12, 15–15
Pts: Wilson 32; Rebs: Richards 15; Asts: Griffin 6		Pts: Johnson, Ruef 17; Rebs: Johnson 8 Asts: Ebzery 5

Bendigo Stadium, Bendigo, Victoria
Referees: Sarah Carey, Jason Kelly, Sean Myers

== Grand Final ==
=== (1) Townsville Fire vs. (2) Bendigo Spirit ===
8 March 2015
2:00PM (AEST)

Boxscore

Townsville Fire	75–65	Bendigo Spirit
Scoring by quarter: 21–23, 26–16, 12–12, 16–14
Pts: Newley 23; Rebs: Batkovic 11; Asts: McCully 9		Pts: Snell 17; Rebs: Richards 17; Asts: Wilson 5

Townsville RSL Stadium, Townsville, Queensland
Attendance: 2,200
Referees: Scott Brown, Jason Kelly, Sean Myers

=== Rosters ===
2014–15 Townsville Fire roster
Players
Coaches

Pos.	No.	Nat.	Name	Ht.
G	4	(Australia)	Wilson, Alex	1.80 m (5 ft 11 in)
G	5	(Australia)	McCully, Rachael	1.70 m (5 ft 7 in)
F	6	(Australia)	Fadljevic, Rosemary	1.83 m (6 ft 0 in)
G	7	(Australia)	Cumming, Stephanie	1.78 m (5 ft 10 in)
C	8	(Australia)	Batkovic, Suzy	1.94 m (6 ft 4 in)
G	10	(Australia)	Newley, Mia	1.88 m (6 ft 2 in)
G	11	(Australia)	Gaze, Kate	1.78 m (5 ft 10 in)
F	12	(Australia)	Zelenka, Jacqui	1.83 m (6 ft 0 in)
F/C	22	(Australia)	Francis, Cayla	1.92 m (6 ft 4 in)
G	32	(New Zealand)	Cocks, Micaela	1.74 m (5 ft 9 in)
F	33	(New Zealand)	Harmon, Jillian	1.85 m (6 ft 1 in)

Head coach

- (Australia) Chris Lucas

Legend

- (C) Team captain
- (DP) Development player
- (I) Import player
- Injured

2014–15 Bendigo Spirit roster
Players
Coaches

Pos.	No.	Nat.	Name	Ht.
G	4	(Australia)	Lavey, Tessa	1.72 m (5 ft 8 in)
G	5	(Australia)	Wilson, Andrea	1.73 m (5 ft 8 in)
G	7	(Australia)	Oliver, Heather	1.78 m (5 ft 10 in)
G	9	(Australia)	Garrick, Madeleine	1.78 m (5 ft 10 in)
C	11	(Australia)	Roberts, Tayla	1.91 m (6 ft 3 in)
G/F	12	(Australia)	Snell, Belinda	1.80 m (5 ft 11 in)
F	14	(Canada)	Aubry, Chelsea	1.88 m (6 ft 2 in)
F	15	(Australia)	Blicavs, Sara	1.89 m (6 ft 2 in)
F/C	20	(Australia)	Richards, Gabrielle	1.88 m (6 ft 2 in)
G	22	(Australia)	Wilson, Kelly	1.70 m (5 ft 7 in)
F	23	(United States)	Griffin, Kelsey	1.88 m (6 ft 2 in)
G	24	(Australia)	Chalmers, Jane	1.63 m (5 ft 4 in)

Head coach

- (Australia) Bernie Harrower

Legend

- (C) Team captain
- (DP) Development player
- (I) Import player
- Injured
