= List of 2023–24 WNBL season transactions =

This is a list of transactions that have taken place during the off-season and the 2023–24 WNBL season.

== Front office movements ==
=== Head coach changes ===
Off-season

Departure date	Team	Outgoing head coach	Reason for departure	Hire date	Incoming head coach	Last coaching position	Ref.
May 11	Sydney Flames	(Australia) Shelley Gorman	Interim head coach	April 18	(Australia) Guy Molloy	Melbourne Boomers head coach (2013–2022)	

== Player movement ==
=== Free agency ===
Player	Date signed	New team	Former team	Ref
(Australia) Jade Melbourne	March 3	Canberra Capitals		
(United States) Nicole Monger	March 10	Canberra Capitals		
(Australia) Rebecca Pizzey	March 21	Canberra Capitals		
(Australia) Gemma Potter	April 27	Canberra Capitals		
(Australia) Kiera Rowe	May 8	Sydney Flames		
(Australia) Isobel Borlase	May 9	Adelaide Lightning		
(New Zealand) Penina Davidson	May 17	Melbourne Boomers		
(Australia) Kristy Wallace	May 17	Melbourne Boomers		
(Australia) Tess Madgen	May 18	Sydney Flames	Melbourne Boomers	
(Australia) Kate Gaze	May 18	Townsville Fire		
(Australia) Amy Atwell	May 19	Perth Lynx		
(Australia) Mackenzie Clinch Hoycard	May 22	Perth Lynx		
(Australia) Jayda Clark	May 24	Canberra Capitals	Centre of Excellence (ACT)	
(Australia) Lauren Nicholson	May 25	Sydney Flames	Townsville Fire	
(United States) Mikaela Ruef	May 25	Townsville Fire		
(Australia) Chloe Forster	May 26	Perth Lynx		
(Australia) Alexandra Sharp	June 2	Canberra Capitals	Perth Lynx	
(Australia) Sara Blicavs	June 5	Melbourne Boomers	Southside Flyers	
(Australia) Monique Conti	June 5	Melbourne Boomers	Southside Flyers	
(Australia) Keely Froling	June 5	Melbourne Boomers	Sydney Flames	
(Australia) Miela Goodchild	June 5	Perth Lynx	Melbourne Boomers	
(Australia) Stephanie Gorman	June 7	Perth Lynx	Cockburn Cougars (WA)	
(Australia) Alice Kunek	June 7	Townsville Fire	Sopron Basket (HUN)	
(Australia) Taylah Simmons	June 8	Melbourne Boomers	ŽKK Celje (SLO)	
(Australia) Cayla George	June 8	Sydney Flames	Melbourne Boomers	
(Australia) Stephanie Talbot	June 16	Adelaide Lightning		
(Australia) Shaneice Swain	June 16	Sydney Flames	Canberra Capitals	
(Australia) Isabelle Bourne	June 22	Adelaide Lightning	Nebraska Cornhuskers (USA)	
(Australia) Alex Fowler	June 22	Canberra Capitals	Portland Pilots (USA)	
(Australia) Anneli Maley	June 23	Perth Lynx	Bendigo Spirit	
(Australia) Vanessa Panousis	June 23	Sydney Flames		
(Australia) Alex Ciabattoni	June 26	Perth Lynx	South West Slammers (WA)	
(Australia) Kelsey Griffin	June 27	Bendigo Spirit		
(Australia) Sami Whitcomb	June 27	Townsville Fire	Perth Lynx	
(Australia) Ella Batish	June 28	Adelaide Lightning		
(Australia) Lara McSpadden	June 29	Sydney Flames	Townsville Fire	
(Australia) Taylor Mole	July 1	Adelaide Lightning	UC Santa Barbara Gauchos (USA)	
(Japan) Monica Okoye	July 3	Canberra Capitals	Eleutheria Moschato (GRE)	
(Australia) Elizabeth Tonks	July 5	Adelaide Lightning	Canberra Capitals	
(Australia) Saffron Shiels	July 6	Townsville Fire	Centre of Excellence (ACT)	
(Australia) Alex Wilson	July 7	Bendigo Spirit		
(Australia) Aimie Rocci	July 7	Melbourne Boomers	Southside Flyers	
(United States) Jocelyn Willoughby	July 13	Adelaide Lightning	Sydney Flames	
(Canada) Cassandra Brown	July 13	Townsville Fire	Mount Gambier Pioneers (SA)	
(United States) Jordin Canada	July 14	Melbourne Boomers	Los Angeles Sparks (USA)	
(Canada) Emily Potter	July 14	Perth Lynx	Panathinaikos (GRE)	
(Australia) Jessica McDowell-White	July 14	Townsville Fire	San Francisco Dons (USA)	
(United States) Mehryn Kraker	July 17	Bendigo Spirit	Luleå Basket (SWE)	
(United States) Tianna Hawkins	July 17	Townsville Fire		
(Australia) Brooke Basham	July 19	Adelaide Lightning		
(Australia) Maddison Rocci	July 19	Southside Flyers		
(Australia) Rebecca Cole	July 20	Southside Flyers		
(Australia) Alicia Froling	July 21	Bendigo Spirit		
(United States) Brianna Turner	July 25	Adelaide Lightning	Çankaya Üniversitesi (TUR)	
(Australia) Casey Samuels	July 26	Bendigo Spirit	Rockingham Flames (WA)	
(United States) Jantel Lavender	July 26	Melbourne Boomers	Emlak Konut (TUR)	
(New Zealand) Tera Reed	July 27	Melbourne Boomers	Pyrintö (FIN)	
(Australia) Nyadiew Puoch	July 27	Southside Flyers		
(Australia) Abigail Wehrung	August 2	Bendigo Spirit		
(United States) Mercedes Russell	August 10	Southside Flyers	Seattle Storm (USA)	
(Australia) Chloe Tugliach	August 11	Canberra Capitals		
(Australia) Leilani Mitchell	August 15	Southside Flyers	Melbourne Boomers	
(Australia) Kelly Wilson	August 17	Bendigo Spirit		
(Canada) Ruth Davis	August 22	Bendigo Spirit	Barça CBS (ESP)	
(Australia) Shakera Reilly	August 23	Canberra Capitals		
(Australia) Abby Solway	August 23	Canberra Capitals		
(United States) Aari McDonald	August 25	Perth Lynx	Atlanta Dream (USA)	
(New Zealand) Esra McGoldrick	September 1	Bendigo Spirit	Mainland Pouākai (NZL)	
(United States) Jasmine Dickey	September 7	Southside Flyers	Basket Crema (ITA)	
(Australia) Indiah Bowyer	September 7	Townsville Fire	Sydney Flames	
(Australia) Ella Tofaeono	September 7	Townsville Fire	Texas Tech Lady Raiders (USA)	
(Australia) Louise Brown	September 8	Southside Flyers	Melbourne Boomers	
(Australia) Ashlee Hannan	September 11	Perth Lynx	Albury Wodonga Bandits (NSW)	
(United States) Paige Bradley	September 13	Sydney Flames	Southern Hoiho (NZL)	
(Australia) Klara Wischer	September 14	Southside Flyers	Sandringham Sabres (VIC)	
(Australia) Molly Coleman	September 15	Adelaide Lightning		
(Australia) Jess Simons	September 15	Adelaide Lightning	Forestville Eagles (SA)	
(Australia) Bianca Stasinowsky	September 15	Adelaide Lightning	Southern Tigers (SA)	
(Australia) Sharna Thompson	September 15	Adelaide Lightning	Norwood Flames (SA)	
(United States) DiDi Richards	September 15	Sydney Flames	Free agent	
(Australia) Grace Foster	September 25	Perth Lynx	Willetton Tigers (WA)	
(Australia) Amy Jacobs	September 25	Perth Lynx	La Salle Explorers (USA)	
(Australia) Emma Klasztorny	September 25	Perth Lynx	Joondalup Wolves (WA)	
(United States) Teige Morrell	September 25	Perth Lynx	Joondalup Wolves (WA)	
(Australia) Lauren Jackson	October 2	Southside Flyers		
(United States) Naz Hillmon	October 4	Melbourne Boomers	Atlanta Dream (USA)	
(Australia) Ahlise Hurst	October 11	Sydney Flames	Oregon Ducks (USA)	
(Australia) Sherrie Calleia	October 23	Melbourne Boomers	Canberra Capitals	
(Australia) Georgia Booth	October 28	Southside Flyers	Kilsyth Cobras (VIC)	
(Australia) Emily Fisher	October 28	Southside Flyers	TCU Horned Frogs (USA)	
(Australia) Isis Lopes	October 28	Southside Flyers	Kilsyth Cobras (VIC)	
(Australia) Emma Nankervis	October 28	Southside Flyers	Washington State Cougars (USA)	
(Australia) Nikita Young	October 28	Southside Flyers	Kilsyth Cobras (VIC)	
(Australia) Abigail Curtin	October 31	Sydney Flames	Newcastle Falcons (NSW)	
(Australia) Isla Juffermans	October 31	Sydney Flames	Centre of Excellence (ACT)	
(Australia) Caitlyn Martin	October 31	Sydney Flames	Norths Bears (NSW)	
(Australia) Carla Pitman	October 31	Sydney Flames	Norths Bears (NSW)	
(Australia) Claudea Waihape-Andrews	November 13	Canberra Capitals	Canberra Nationals (ACT)	
(Australia) Jade Kirisome	November 15	Canberra Capitals	Saint Mary's Gaels (USA)	
(Australia) Grace Graham	November 17	Melbourne Boomers	Kansas City Roos (USA)	
(Australia) Sarah Allen	November 22	Perth Lynx	East Perth Eagles (WA)	
(Sweden) Amanda Zahui B.	December 4	Townsville Fire	PF Schio (ITA)	
(Australia) Megan McKay	January 19	Melbourne Boomers	Bendigo Spirit	

=== Released ===
Player	Date	Team	Reason	Ref
(Australia) Kate Gaze	July 5	Townsville Fire	Pregnancy	
(United States) Jantel Lavender	October 3	Melbourne Boomers	Personal reasons	
(United States) Tianna Hawkins	October 30	Townsville Fire	Injury	
(New Zealand) Tahlia Tupaea	November 3	Canberra Capitals	Injury	
(Australia) Taylah Simmons	December 30	Melbourne Boomers	Going overseas	

== Outgoing movement ==
=== Going overseas ===
Player	Date signed	Former team	New team	Ref
(Australia) Malia Tharpe	May 19	Perth Lynx	San Diego Toreros (USA)	
(Australia) Marena Whittle	June 5	Adelaide Lightning	CB Estudiantes (ESP)	
(Australia) Abby Bishop	June 5	Southside Flyers	CB Jairis (ESP)	
(Australia) Lauren Scherf	June 6	Perth Lynx	Flammes Carolo Basket (FRA)	
(Australia) Emma Donnelly	June 14	Sydney Flames	Iona Gaels (USA)	
(United States) Tiffany Mitchell	June 28	Melbourne Boomers	Galatasaray S.K. (TUR)	
(United States) Rae Burrell	July 3	Canberra Capitals	Kangoeroes Basket Mechelen (BEL)	
(Australia) Chloe Bibby	July 3	Perth Lynx	Gorzów Wielkopolski (POL)	
(United States) Robbi Ryan	July 10	Perth Lynx	Luleå Basket (SWE)	
(Australia) Tayah Burrows	July 13	Perth Lynx	Östersund Basket (SWE)	
(United States) Jacinta Monroe	July 14	Adelaide Lightning	KSC Szekszárd (HUN)	
(United Kingdom) Karlie Samuelson	July 17	Townsville Fire	London Lions (GBR)	
(Australia) Shyla Heal	July 29	Townsville Fire	Lublin (POL)	
(United States) Olivia Nelson-Ododa	October 1	Melbourne Boomers	Guangdong Vermilion Birds (CHN)	
(United States) Kayla Thornton	November 17	Southside Flyers	Dynamo Kursk (RUS)	
(Australia) Taylah Simmons	January 15	Melbourne Boomers	Gisa Lions MBC (GER)	

=== Retirement ===
Name	Date	Team(s) played (years)	Notes	Ref.
(Australia) Mia Murray	May 17	Australian Institute of Sport (2005–2008); Adelaide Lightning (2008–2011); Townsville Fire (2011–2018, 2020–2022); Melbourne Boomers (2022–23)	3x WNBL Champion (2015, 2016, 2018); Grand Final MVP (2015)	
(Australia) Rachel Brewster	May 17	Melbourne Boomers (2019–2023)	WNBL Champion (2022)	
(Australia) Tiana Mangakahia	June 5	Australian Institute of Sport (2011–12); Townsville Fire (2013–14); Sydney Flames (2022–23)		

== See also ==
- List of 2023–24 WNBL team rosters
