= 2019–20 Bendigo Spirit season =

- Head Coach: Tracy York
- Captain: Tessa Lavey; Kelly Wilson (co)
- Venue: Bendigo Stadium

Results
- Record: 5–16
- Ladder: 7th
- Finals: Did not qualify

Leaders
- Points: Ernst (12.0)
- Rebounds: Ernst (6.7)
- Assists: Wilson (5.8)

The 2019–20 Bendigo Spirit season is the 13th season for the franchise in the Women's National Basketball League (WNBL).

This is the Spirit's first season under new head coach, Tracy York, who overtook the role from Simon Pritchard after he spent four seasons in the position.

== Roster ==
2019–20 Bendigo Spirit roster
Players
Coaches

Pos.	No.	Nat.	Name	Ht.
G	3	(Australia)	Tessari, Kara	1.65 m (5 ft 5 in)
G	4	(Australia)	Heal, Shyla	1.67 m (5 ft 6 in)
F	12	(Australia)	Skinner, Demi	1.90 m (6 ft 3 in)
G	13	(Australia)	Wehrung, Abigail	1.78 m (5 ft 10 in)
F	18	(Australia)	Ernst, Carley	1.96 m (6 ft 5 in)
F	20	(Australia)	Richards, Gabrielle	1.88 m (6 ft 2 in)
G	22	(Australia)	Wilson, Kelly (C)	1.70 m (5 ft 7 in)
G	24	(Australia)	Lavey, Tessa (C)	1.72 m (5 ft 8 in)
F/C	32	(United States)	Tobin, Rebecca	1.95 m (6 ft 5 in)
F	35	(United States)	Grays, Martè	1.88 m (6 ft 2 in)

Head coach

- (Australia) Tracy York

Assistant coach(es)

- (Australia) Mark Alabakov
- (Australia) Tom Thorn
- (Australia) Cam Wilkosz

Legend

- (C) Team captain
- (DP) Development player
- (I) Import player
- Injured

- Roster
Updated: 11 October 2019

== Standings ==
#	WNBL Championship ladder				
#	Team	W	L	PCT	GP
1	Southside Flyers	17	4	80.9	21
2	Canberra Capitals	15	6	71.4	21
3	Melbourne Boomers	15	6	71.4	21
4	Adelaide Lightning	12	9	57.1	21
5	Perth Lynx	8	13	38.0	21
6	Sydney Uni Flames	7	14	33.3	21
7	Bendigo Spirit	5	16	23.8	21
8	Townsville Fire	5	16	23.8	21

== Results ==
=== Pre-season ===
Game	Date	Team	Score	High points	High rebounds	High assists	Location	Record
1	September; 11	China	88–66	Ernst (29)	Grays (12)	Ernst (5)	Bendigo Stadium	1–0
2	September; 15	Melbourne	64–62	Ernst (29)	Tobin (10)	Wilson (6)	Traralgon Sports Stadium	2–0
3	September; 21	BA Centre of Excellence	94–54	–	–	–	Echuca Basketball Association	3–0
4	September; 25	NBL1 All-Stars	120–63	–	–	–	Sunbury Basketball Stadium	4–0
5	October; 3	@ Southside	73–56	Tobin (15)	Richards (8)	Lavey, Wilson (6)	Dandenong Stadium	5–0

=== Regular season ===
Game	Date	Team	Score	High points	High rebounds	High assists	Location	Record
1	October; 12	Melbourne	72–87	Grays, Heal, Skinner (14)	Grays (9)	Wilson (8)	Bendigo Stadium	0–1
2	October; 19	@ Melbourne	70–74	Wilson (19)	Ernst (9)	Wilson (7)	State Basketball Centre	0–2
3	October; 20	Perth	91–79	Ernst (29)	Ernst (16)	Wilson (9)	Bendigo Stadium	1–2
4	October; 26	@ Southside	77–85	Grays (22)	Grays (9)	Lavey (7)	Traralgon Sports Stadium	1–3
5	November; 1	Adelaide	67–54	Wehrung (16)	Tobin (12)	Wilson (7)	Bendigo Stadium	2–3
6	November; 3	@ Southside	80–93	Tobin (16)	Ernst, Tobin (6)	Lavey, Wilson (7)	Dandenong Stadium	2–4
7	November; 9	@ Adelaide	77–105	Ernst (17)	Ernst, Tobin (6)	Heal, Lavey (3)	Titanium Security Arena	2–5
8	November; 24	Melbourne	59–75	Wehrung (13)	Tobin (15)	Wilson (9)	Bendigo Stadium	2–6
9	November; 29	Sydney	75–80	Lavey (16)	Tobin (16)	Lavey (11)	Bendigo Stadium	2–7
10	December; 6	Canberra	66–91	Lavey (17)	Tobin (7)	Wilson (7)	Bendigo Stadium	2–8
11	December; 8	@ Townsville	80–94	Skinner (26)	Wilson (10)	Wilson (7)	Townsville Stadium	2–9
12	December; 15	@ Adelaide	75–91	Ernst (21)	Ernst (9)	Wilson (6)	Titanium Security Arena	2–10
13	December; 19	Sydney	81–88	Ernst (20)	Ernst (7)	Ernst (5)	Bendigo Stadium	2–11
14	December; 21	@ Canberra	66–76	Skinner (15)	Ernst (11)	Lavey (3)	National Convention Centre	2–12
15	December; 28	Townsville	79–78	Ernst (24)	Ernst, Wehrung, Wilson (6)	Wilson (5)	Bendigo Stadium	3–12
16	January; 3	Canberra	94–90	Heal (24)	Heal, Richards (8)	Wilson (9)	Bendigo Stadium	4–12
17	January; 12	@ Perth	81–100	Heal (30)	Ernst (10)	Wilson (11)	Bendat Basketball Centre	4–13
18	January; 18	Southside	76–91	Lavey (20)	Heal (8)	Wilson (5)	Bendigo Stadium	4–14
19	January; 24	Perth	66–89	Heal (17)	Heal (8)	Lavey (5)	Bendigo Stadium	4–15
20	January; 30	@ Sydney	68–78	Heal (17)	Richards (6)	Lavey (6)	Brydens Stadium	4–16
21	February; 1	@ Townsville	89–69	Ernst (26)	Ernst (10)	Ernst, Lavey (7)	Townsville Stadium	5–16

== Awards ==
=== In-season ===
Award	Recipient	Round(s)	Ref.
Team of the Week	Carley Ernst	Round 2	
Team of the Week	Abigail Wehrung	Round 11	
Team of the Week	Shyla Heal	Round 12	
Team of the Week	Tessa Lavey	Round 16	

=== Club Awards ===
Award	Recipient	Date	Ref.
Most Valuable Player	Carley Ernst	3 February 2020	
Most Consistent Player	Shyla Heal	3 February 2020	
Team Spirit Award	Tessa Lavey	3 February 2020	
