= Andrea Wilson =

Australian basketball player

Personal information
- Born: 5 December 1985 (age 40) Melbourne, Victoria
- Listed height: 5 ft 8 in (1.73 m)

Career information
- Playing career: 2007–present
- Position: Guard

Career history
- 2007–2017: Bendigo Spirit

Career highlights
- 2× WNBL champion (2013, 2014)

Andrea Wilson (born 5 December 1985) is an Australian basketball player.

== Early life ==
Wilson was born in Melbourne, Victoria.

== Professional career ==
=== WNBL ===
Wilson made her professional debut with the Spirit in 2007. She has since been a strong, consistent member of the Spirit roster. With the Spirit, she has won two Championships in 2013 and 2014, led by the likes of Kristi Harrower, Gabrielle Richards and her sister, Kelly Wilson. Wilson has been re-signed for the 2016–17 season.

== Personal life ==
Wilson's older sister, Kelly, is also a professional basketball player. They spent several seasons together at the Bendigo Spirit.
