= Natalie Burton =

Australian basketball player (born 1989)

- Burton with the Warwick Senators in 2026

Personal information
- Born: 23 March 1989 (age 37) Perth, Western Australia, Australia
- Listed height: 194 cm (6 ft 4 in)

Career information
- High school: Carine Senior (Perth, Western Australia)
- College: West Virginia (2008–2012)
- WNBA draft: 2012: undrafted
- Playing career: 2006–2026
- Position: Power forward / center
- Coaching career: 2021–present

Career history

Playing
- 2006–2008: Perry Lakes Hawks
- 2012–2013: Perry Lakes Hawks
- 2012–2014: West Coast Waves
- 2014: BA Centre of Excellence
- 2014–2015: Melbourne Boomers
- 2015–2018: Perth Lynx
- 2017–2021: Perry Lakes Hawks
- 2018–2019: Herner TC
- 2019: Union Saint-Amand Porte du Hainaut
- 2020: Sydney Uni Flames
- 2022–2026: Warwick Senators
- 2023: Mainland Pouakai

Coaching
- 2021–2024: Perth Lynx (assistant)

Career highlights
- NBL1 National champion (2022); 5× SBL / NBL1 West champion (2007, 2008, 2017, 2022, 2026); DBBL champion (2019); DBBL Cup winner (2019); SBL Most Improved Player (2008)

Natalie Burton (born 23 March 1989) is an Australian former professional basketball player. She played college basketball in the United States for the West Virginia Mountaineers before beginning her career in the Women's National Basketball League (WNBL) in 2012. She played seven seasons in the WNBL and played in Germany and France in 2018 and 2019. In the NBL1 West, Burton has played for the Perry Lakes Hawks and Warwick Senators. She is a five-time NBL1 West champion, three with the Hawks (2007, 2008, 2017) and two with the Senators (2022, 2026). She helped the Senators win the NBL1 National championship in 2022 as well. She served as an assistant coach with the Perth Lynx in the WNBL between 2021 and 2024.

Burton played for the Australian national team, the Opals, between 2013 and 2016. She was an Olympian with the Opals at the 2016 Summer Olympics in Rio. She holds dual Australian and British nationality.

== Early life and career ==
Burton was born in Perth, Western Australia, in the suburb of Stirling. She attended Carine Senior High School.

Burton played in the State Basketball League (SBL) for the Perry Lakes Hawks in 2006, 2007 and 2008. In the 2008 season, she was named the SBL Most Improved Player. The Hawks won SBL championships in 2007 and 2008.

== College career ==
Between 2008 and 2012, Burton played college basketball in the United States for the West Virginia Mountaineers. She averaged 2.8 points and 2.6 rebounds in 119 games, with her 52.8 career field goal percentage ranking her as the second best in West Virginia history. She graduated in May 2012 with a degree in finance.

=== West Virginia statistics ===
Ratios
Year	Team	GP	FG%	3P%	FT%	RBG	APG	BPG	SPG	PPG
2008-09	West Virginia	33	50.4%	-	29.5%	4.94	0.33	0.46	0.58	4.79
2009-10	West Virginia	35	53.3%	-	48.1%	2.17	0.14	0.40	0.26	2.66
2010-11	West Virginia	28	60.5%	-	23.1%	1.32	0.14	0.18	0.46	1.96
2011-12	West Virginia	23	51.7%	-	37.5%	1.22	0.22	0.52	0.17	1.44
Career		119	52.8%	-	33.9%	2.55	0.21	0.39	0.38	2.85

Totals
Year	Team	GP	FG	FGA	3P	3PA	FT	FTA	REB	A	BK	ST	PTS
2008-09	West Virginia	33	70	139	0	0	18	61	163	11	15	19	158
2009-10	West Virginia	35	40	75	0	0	13	27	76	5	14	9	93
2010-11	West Virginia	28	26	43	0	0	3	13	37	4	5	13	55
2011-12	West Virginia	23	15	29	0	0	3	8	28	5	12	4	33
Career		119	151	286	0	0	37	109	304	25	46	45	339

== Professional career ==
=== WNBL and Europe ===
Burton debuted in the Women's National Basketball League (WNBL) with the West Coast Waves in the 2012–13 season. She averaged 8.1 points and 5.4 rebounds in 24 games in her rookie season and then averaged 6.8 points and 4.7 rebounds in 17 games with the Waves in the 2013–14 season.

In April 2014, Burton signed with the Melbourne Boomers for the 2014–15 WNBL season. In 22 games, she averaged 7.0 points and 5.1 rebounds per game.

On 17 April 2015, Burton signed with the Perth Lynx for the 2015–16 WNBL season. She helped the Lynx reach the WNBL Grand Final, where they lost 2–0 to the Townsville Fire. In 27 games, she averaged 6.0 points and 5.1 rebounds per game.

On 27 May 2016, Burton re-signed with the Lynx for the 2016–17 WNBL season. On 25 November 2016, she played her 100th WNBL game.

On 31 August 2017, Burton re-signed with the Lynx for the 2017–18 WNBL season.

In January 2018, Burton joined German team Herner TC for the rest of the 2017–18 DBBL season. She returned to Herner TC for the 2018–19 season and helped the team win the DBBL championship and DBBL Cup.

Burton joined Union Saint-Amand Porte du Hainaut of the French LFB for the 2019–20 season, but left the team in December 2019 after appearing in nine games.

Burton joined the Sydney Uni Flames for the 2020 WNBL Hub season in Queensland.

=== Australian state leagues and New Zealand ===
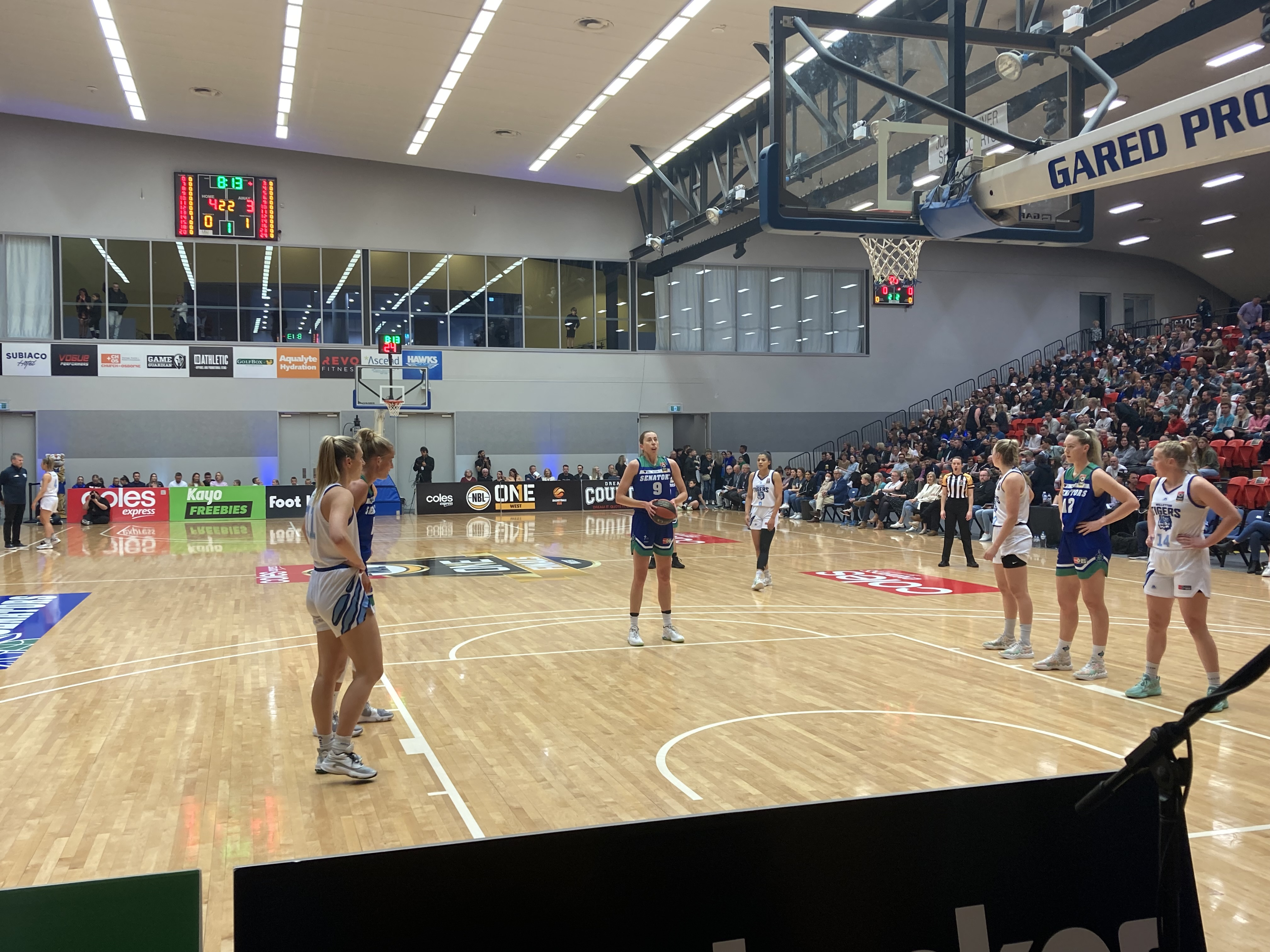
Burton with the Senators during the 2022 NBL1 West Grand Final

Burton returned to the Perry Lakes Hawks for a five-game stint during the 2012 State Basketball League season. She played 15 games for the Hawks in the 2013 season.

In 2014, Burton played nine games for the BA Centre of Excellence in the South East Australian Basketball League.

Burton's next stint with the Hawks came in the 2017 season, where she helped the team win the SBL championship. She continued with the Hawks in the SBL in 2018 and 2019, and then played for the Hawks in the West Coast Classic in 2020. She played for the Hawks in the inaugural season of the NBL1 West in 2021.

Burton joined the Warwick Senators for the 2022 NBL1 West season. She helped the team win the NBL1 West championship, and at the NBL1 National Finals, the Senators went undefeated and won the NBL National championship.

Burton returned to the Senators for the 2023 NBL1 West season and played her 200th SBL/NBL1 game in June 2023. Following the NBL1 West season, she had a three-game stint with the Mainland Pouakai of the Tauihi Basketball Aotearoa in New Zealand. She returned to the Senators for the 2024 NBL1 West season. She re-joined the Senators for the 2025 NBL1 West season, helping them reach the NBL1 West Grand Final, where they lost 91–71 to the Cockburn Cougars.

Burton re-joined the Senators for the 2026 NBL1 West season. On 31 July 2026, she announced that she would retire at the end of the 2026 season. She helped the Senators return to the NBL1 West Grand Final, where they defeated the Cougars 102–76 to win the championship. Burton had four points, three rebounds and three steals in winning her fifth championship and second with the Senators. At the 2026 NBL1 National Finals, Burton suffered a lower leg injury in the first game.

== National team career ==
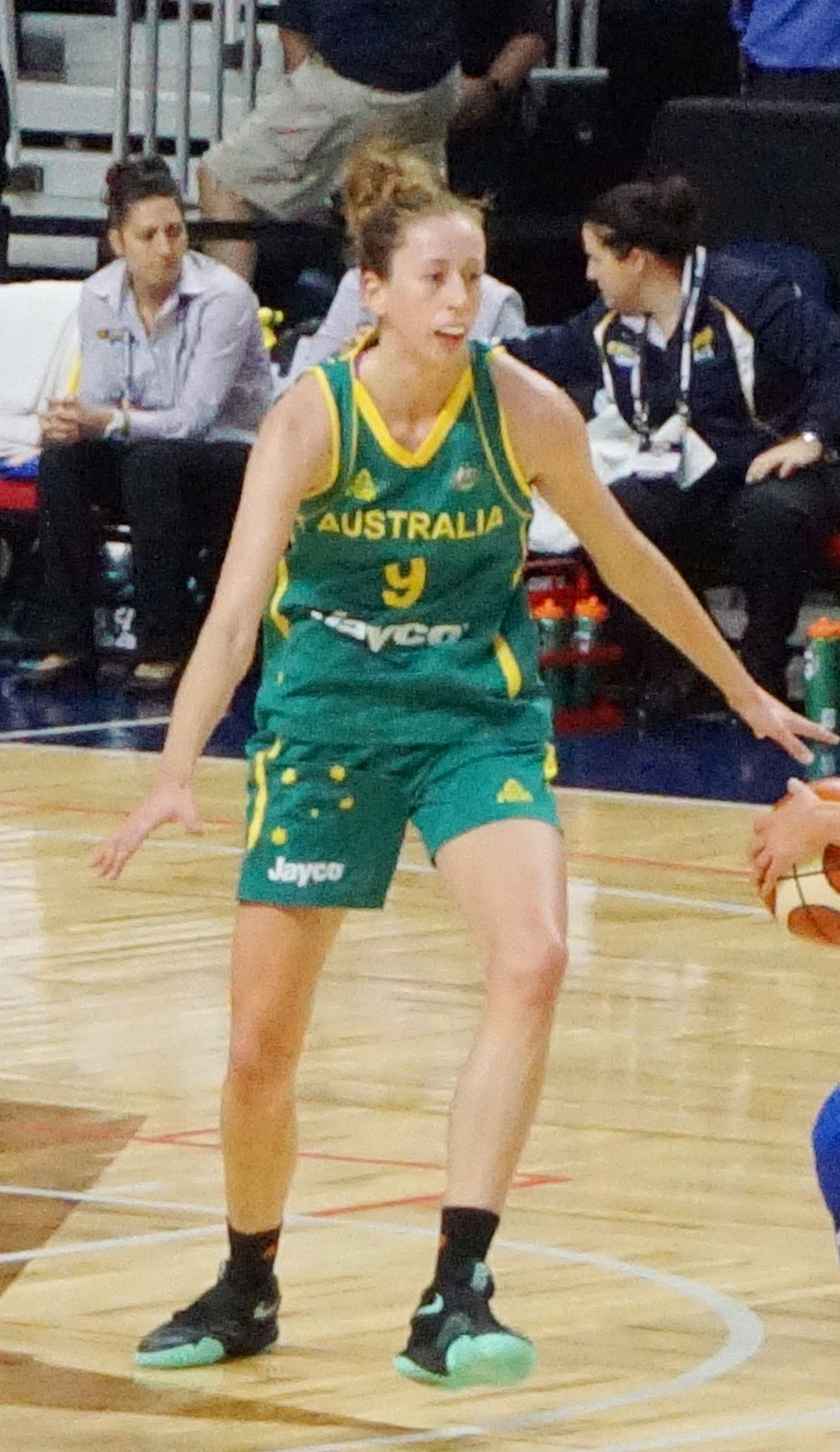
Burton with the Australian Opals in July 2016

Burton represented Australia at the 2013 World University Games in Russia, where they lost to Team USA in the semi-finals. Burton scored four points in the semi-final. Australia went on to win the bronze medal game.

Burton debuted for the Australian Opals at the 2013 FIBA Oceania Championship. In 2014, she helped the Opals win bronze at the FIBA World Championship. She played for the Opals at the 2015 FIBA Oceania Championship and then became an Olympian with the Opals at the 2016 Summer Olympics in Rio. The Opals were knocked out in the quarter-finals at the Rio Olympics, which led to Burton never being invited back to a training camp with the team.

== Coaching career ==
In September 2021, Burton was appointed assistant coach of the Perth Lynx for the 2021–22 WNBL season. She continued as assistant in 2022–23 and 2023–24.

== Personal life ==
Burton is the daughter of Cliff and Rosemary Burton. Her younger sister, Emily, also played basketball and was a member of the Hawks' 2017 championship team.

Burton holds dual Australian and British nationality.
