= Rebeca Davila =

Puerto Rican basketball referee

Rebeca Davila (born in 1989) is a Puerto Rican professional basketball referee. In 2020, she became the third woman in history to work a Baloncesto Superior Nacional regular season game. On November 10 of that year, Davila joined Carmen Garcia and Brenda Mateo as a woman referee in the league. Garcia was the first one, doing so from 2004 to 2014, and Mateo was the second one, working from 2010 to 2015.

Davila also has worked as a referee at the Women's Baloncesto Superior Nacional league. During the 2020 BSN league's season, which, because of the COVID-19 outbreak, was played inside a "bubble" at the Wyndham hotel in Rio Grande, she was called to referee games. During the 2022 BSN season, she was joined as referee by Sonia Maldonado and, later also, by former basketball player Julirys Guzmán. During 2025, Davila also worked as a referee at the BSN's female offshoot, the BSNF (WNBF).

== See also ==
- List of Puerto Ricans
