= Jane Chalmers =

Australian basketball player

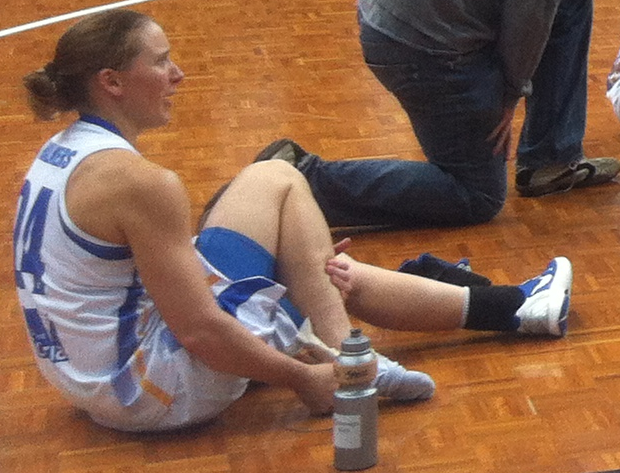

No. 24 – Bendigo Spirit
- Position: Guard

Personal information
- Born: 10 March 1983 (age 43) Echuca, Victoria
- Listed height: 5 ft 4 in (1.63 m)

Career information
- College: Northwest Missouri (2002–2004)
- Playing career: 2007–present

Career history
- 2007–2016: Bendigo Spirit

Career highlights
- 2x WNBL Champion (2013, 2014)

Jane Chalmers (born 10 March 1983) is an Australian professional basketball player who plays for the Bendigo Spirit in the Women's National Basketball League.

== Professional career ==
=== College ===
Chalmers began her college career at Iowa Central Community College in Fort Dodge, Iowa for the Iowa Central Tritons, from 2000 to 2002. After strong showings, Chalmers transferred to Northwest Missouri State University in Maryville, Missouri with the Bearcats, in NCAA Division II.

=== WNBL ===
After strong showings with Bendigo in the SEABL, Chalmers was invited to attend training with the incoming WNBL side, the Bendigo Spirit. Chalmers then made her professional debut with the Spirit in 2007. She has since been a consistent member of the Spirit roster. With the Spirit, she has won two Championships in 2013 and 2014, led by the likes of Kristi Harrower, Gabrielle Richards and Kelsey Griffin.
