= Carley Ernst =

Australian basketball player (born 1994)

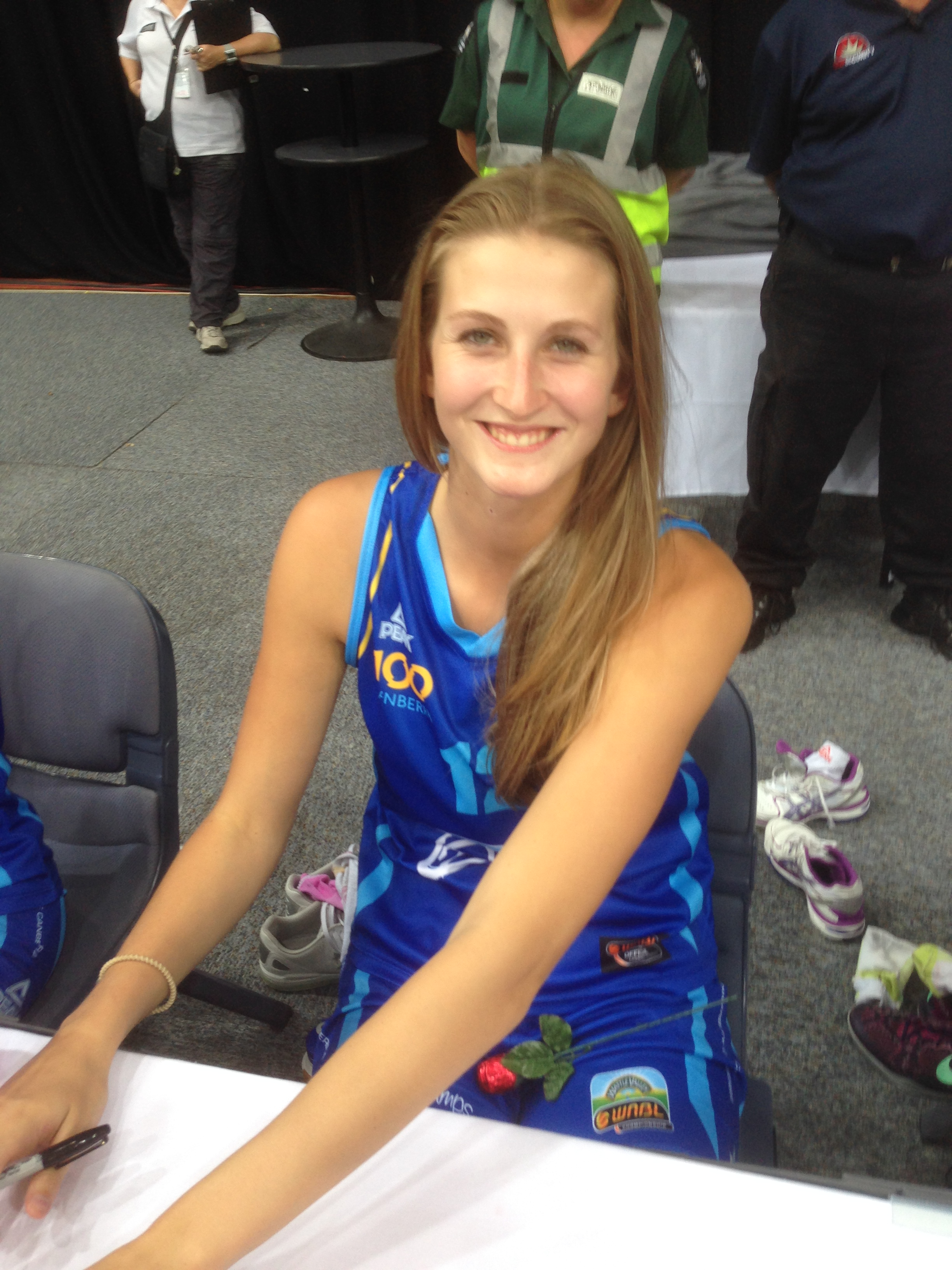
- Ernst with the Canberra Capitals in 2014

No. 11 – Southside Flyers
- Position: Power forward / Centre
- League: WNBL

Personal information
- Born: 1 August 1994 (age 32) Melbourne, Victoria, Australia
- Listed height: 196 cm (6 ft 5 in)

Career information
- WNBA draft: 2014: 3rd round, 30th overall pick
- Drafted by: Washington Mystics
- Playing career: 2009–present

Career history
- 2009–2012: AIS
- 2012–2013: Dandenong Rangers
- 2013–2014: Canberra Capitals
- 2014–2015: Adelaide Lightning
- 2015–2017: Perth Lynx
- 2017–2019: Dandenong Rangers
- 2018: ACS Sepsi SIC
- 2019–2020: Bendigo Spirit
- 2022: Melbourne Boomers
- 2022–present: Southside Flyers

Career highlights
- 2× WNBL champion (2022, 2024); WNBL Rookie of the Year (2012)
- Stats at Basketball Reference

Carley Monika Ernst (née Mijović; born 1 August 1994) is an Australian professional basketball player.

== Early life ==
Ernst was born in Melbourne, Victoria, in the suburb of Dandenong.

== Career ==
Ernst began her professional career in 2009 when she joined the Australian Institute of Sport (AIS) for the 2009–10 WNBL season. She managed just four games in her first season and went on to sit out the entire 2010–11 season after undergoing a second knee operation. She returned to the AIS line-up in 2011–12 and played out her first full season. She subsequently earned WNBL Rookie of the Year honours after averaging 9.1 points and 5.2 rebounds in 18 games.

In May 2012, Ernst signed with the Dandenong Rangers for the 2012–13 WNBL season. In 23 games for Dandenong, she averaged 6.1 points and 3.5 rebounds per game. During the 2013 off-season, she played for the Kilsyth Cobras.

In June 2013, Ernst signed with the Canberra Capitals for the 2013–14 WNBL season. In 24 games for Canberra, she averaged 9.4 points and 4.0 rebounds per game. During the 2014 off-season, she remained in Canberra and continue her development at Basketball Australia's Centre of Excellence.

On 11 June 2014, Ernst signed with the Adelaide Lightning for the 2014–15 WNBL season. In 22 games for Adelaide, she averaged 6.9 points and 3.5 rebounds per game. During the 2015 off-season, she played for the Waverley Falcons.

On 3 June 2015, Ernst signed with the Perth Lynx for the 2015–16 WNBL season. She helped lead the Lynx to a second place regular season finish with a 16–8 win–loss record, and went on to score 17 points in the team's semi-final win over the first-seeded Townsville Fire. With the win, the Lynx advanced to the WNBL grand final for the first time since 1999. There they were outclassed by the defending champion Townsville (who made it to the grand final via the preliminary final), losing the best-of-three series 2–0. She appeared in all 27 games for the Lynx in 2015–16, averaging 11.6 points and 3.6 rebounds per game. She remained in Perth during the 2016 off-season and joined the Kalamunda Eastern Suns of the State Basketball League.

On 28 April 2016, Ernst re-signed with the Lynx for the 2016–17 WNBL season. She helped lead the Lynx finish third in the regular season with a 15–9 win–loss record; the Lynx went on to lose 2–1 to the Dandenong Rangers in the semi-finals. Ernst appeared in all 27 games for the Lynx in 2016–17, averaging 13.3 points, 7.3 rebounds and 1.2 assists per game. Following her second season with the Lynx, Ernst joined the Frankston Blues for the 2017 SEABL season.

After a season with the Dandenong Rangers in 2017–18, she joined ACS Sepsi SIC in Romania in February 2018.

She returned to the Rangers for the 2018–19 season and then played for the Bendigo Spirit in 2019–20 and the 2020 WNBL Hub season. In January 2022, she joined the Melbourne Boomers for the rest of the 2021–22 season. With the Southside Flyers in 2022–23, she played her 250th WNBL game.

In 2024, Ernst helped the Waverley Falcons win the NBL1 South championship while earning grand final MVP honours. She went on to help the Falcons win the NBL1 National championship at the 2024 NBL1 National Finals.

Ernst was set to play for the Southside Flyers in 2025–26 but ultimately missed the season due to pregnancy. She re-joined the Flyers for the 2026–27 season and played her 300th WNBL game in October 2026.

== National team ==
=== Youth level ===
Ernst has been a member of both the Australian Under-17 and Under-19 national women's teams, winning bronze in 2013 with the Gems at the FIBA Under-19 World Championship.

== Personal life ==
Ernst holds a dual-passport through her Serbian heritage.

Ernst and her husband, Josh, have two children.
