= Ebony Rolph =

Australian basketball player

Personal information
- Born: 16 August 1994 (age 32) Portland, Victoria
- Listed height: 5 ft 11 in (1.80 m)

Career information
- Playing career: 2011–2019
- Position: Forward

Career history
- 2011; 2013; 2015–2019: Geelong Supercats
- 2015–2018: Bendigo Spirit

Ebony Tamika Rolph (born 16 August 1994) is an Australian former basketball player.

== Playing career ==
Rolph played in the SEABL for the Geelong Supercats in 2011, 2013, and every year between 2015 and 2018. In 2019, she played for the Supercats in the inaugural NBL1 season.

Between 2015 and 2018, Rolph was a member of the Bendigo Spirit of the Women's National Basketball League (WNBL).
