= Ashleigh Karaitiana =

New Zealand-Australian basketball player

No. 47 – Melbourne Boomers
- Position: Forward
- League: Women's National Basketball League

Personal information
- Born: 26 June 1992 (age 34) Hamilton, New Zealand
- Listed height: 6 ft 0 in (1.83 m)
- Listed weight: 172 lb (78 kg)

Career information
- High school: Endeavour (Sydney, New South Wales)
- College: Hawaii (2012–2016)
- Playing career: 2010–present

Career history
- 2010–2011: Sydney Uni Flames
- 2016–2018: Bendigo Spirit
- 2020–present: Melbourne Boomers

Career highlights
- Big West Tournament MVP (2016)

Ashleigh Karaitiana (born 26 June 1992) is a New Zealand and Australian professional basketball player.

== College ==
Karaitiana played college basketball at the University of Hawaiʻi for the Rainbow Wahine in Honolulu, Hawaii. In her last year Karaitiana scored 17 points, making five 3-pointers, and Hawaii throttled UC Davis 78-59 in the Big West Conference Tournament championship game To qualify for the NCAA tournament. They went on to the tournament and lost to UCLA 50-66.

=== Statistics ===
Year	Team	GP	GS	MPG	FG%	3P%	FT%	RPG	APG	SPG	BPG	TO	PPG
2012–13	Hawaii	31	30	26.4	.404	.314	.614	4.4	1.3	0.8	0.1	2.6	8.5
2013–14	Hawaii	31	9	26.7	.386	.382	.703	5.2	1.6	0.6	0.2	2.1	10.4
2014–15	Hawaii	31	30	30.0	.346	.281	.697	5.0	2.5	1.1	0.3	1.8	10.0
2015–16	Hawaii	32	32	26.3	.361	.323	.721	3.9	2.4	0.5	0.3	1.8	8.5
Career		125	101	27.3	.375	.319	.681	4.6	1.9	0.7	0.2	2.1	9.3

== Career ==
=== SEABL ===
Karaitiana would play her first season in SEABL with the Southern Districts Spartans where she would play two games of the season before returning to Hawaii to graduate in 2016.

=== WNBL ===
Karaitiana would begin her WNBL career in her home town of Sydney, signed as a development player with the Sydney Uni Flames for the 2010–11 WNBL season. Karaitiana would then depart to begin her college career in the United States. Karaitiana was signed by the Bendigo Spirit for 2016–17, where she will make her return to the league.

After a two-year absence and giving birth to her first child, Karaitiana returned to the league signing with the Melbourne Boomers for the 2020 season. There, Karaitiana joins several of her Tall Ferns teammates all playing under national team head coach, Guy Molloy.

== National team ==
=== Youth Level ===
Karaitiana first represented Australia, alongside Elizabeth Cambage at the 2009 Under-19 World Championship in Bangkok, Thailand where Australia placed fifth. She would once again represent the Gems at the 2011 Under-19 World Championship in Chile where they narrowly missed out on the bronze medal, placing fourth.

=== Senior Level ===
Karaitiana has since switched her allegiances to her country of birth and began representing the New Zealand Tall Ferns in 2018. Karaitiana was named to the final roster for the 2019 FIBA Asia Cup.
