= Rachael McCully =

Australian basketball player

Townsville Fire
- Position: Guard
- League: WNBL

Personal information
- Born: 5 April 1982 (age 44) Adelaide, South Australia, Australia
- Listed height: 170 cm (5 ft 7 in)

Career highlights
- 2× WNBL Defensive Player of Year (2010, 2011); 2× ACC All-Star five (2007, 2008)

Rachael McCully (née Flanagan; born 5 April 1982) is one of Australia's most accomplished female basketballers. During a decorated WNBL career, McCully played for the Adelaide Lightning, Dandenong Rangers and Townsville Fire, earning the WNBL's Robyn Maher Defensive Player of Year award in 2009/2010 and 2010/2011. She played her 324th and final WNBL game in the 2014/15 WNBL Grand Final as she led the Townsville Fire to their inaugural championship. McCully was also a member of the Australia women's national basketball team, being named in the team for the first time in 2010 and narrowly missing out on selection for the 2014 FIBA World Championship for Women.

== Personal ==
Flanagan was born on 5 April 1982 in Adelaide. She is 170 cm (5 ft 7 in) tall. She has a certificate IV in Fitness and is a personal trainer.

In July 2011, Flanagan "was diagnosed with a potentially career-threatening knee condition." She had "severe swelling of the patellar tendon" that her doctor "warned could jeopardise her career if she did not take "immediate steps to address it"."

== Basketball ==
Flanagan is a guard and played junior basketball for the South Australian Forestville Eagles.

Flanagan took the basketball season between the 2008/2009 and 2009/2010 offseason off. Of the break, she said: "It's a lot. I feel like I'm 55 (years old) sometimes, especially during warm-ups, but it was a great break and my body really appreciated it. I'm a bit more refreshed this time after playing eight seasons straight through WNBL and ABA, so I'm very refreshed and really looking forward to that first game." In 2010, she was named to the Queensland Basketball League's All-Star Five. That year, she played for the Mackay Meteorettes.

=== WNBL ===
Flanagan played for the Adelaide Lightning in the 2000/2001 season and stayed with the team until the end of the 2003/2004 season. She then played for the Townsville Fire from 2004/2005 until 2006/2007.

Flanagan played for the Dandenong Rangers in the 2007/2008 season. She played as a point guard for the team. She had an average of 5.7 points per game that season.

Flanagan returned to the Fire for the 2008/2009 season and continued to be on the roster into the 2014/15 season. During this time, McCully became all-time games record holder for the club with 228. She surpassed former teammate Tania Baxter, who previously held the record with 131. After guiding the Fire to their inaugural championship in 2014/15, McCully became the first player club history to have her number (5) retired. In 2006/2007, she played in 21 games and earned 62 assists. In 2008/2009, she averaged 6.5 points per game for a total of 157 points scored in the season. She also had 113 assists, leading her team in this area. She was with the team in 2009/2010. That season, she was fourth in the league for steals with an average of 1.7 per game, seventh in the league for four shot percentage at 78.6% and seventh in the league for assists with an average of 4.1 per game. That season, she also averaged 13 points a game, and 3.4 rebounds a game. In the post season, she played in two games where she had an average of 2 assists, 3 steals, 3 rebounds ad 14.5 points per game. In 2009/2010, she was one of the two most players with WNBL experience on the Fire. In an October 2009 game against Canberra, she was fouled with 1.9 left in the game, had two free throws which she made and gave her team the win to the game. In an October 2009 game against the AIS, she scored 19 points in a game her team won 97–62. In the 2010/2011 season, she played in all regular season games, 22 total. For the season, she had an average of 14.3 points and 4.9 assists per game, which was her best performance to date in the league. She was named the Fire's MVP in 2009/2010, and was named the team's Players' Player and Fans' Player of the Year honours. She was one of the stars on Townsville team. She earned the WNBL's Robyn Maher Defensive Player of Year for the 2009/2010 and 2010/2011 seasons. She was the team captain in 2010/2011. In November 2010, she played in a game against the Australian Institute of Sport that her team won 95–55. Before a crowd of 478, she scored 24 points, had 5 rebounds and 3 assists. She played for the Townsville Fire in 2011/2012. At the end of the season, she assisted the head coach in player recruitment. She re-signed with the team for another season on 22 March 2012. She was the team's captain. In the 2011/2012 season, she played her 150th game in the league. At the end season, for Townsville, she was the all-time assists leader with 572 and steals with 172. Her 2011/2012 style of play was described by the Townsville Bulletin as gutsy. In a February 2011 game victory for the Dandenong Rangers over Townsville Fire with a score of 70–54, she scored 18 points while forcing 8 turnovers.

=== National team ===
Flanagan was named in the senior national team for the first time in 2010. She participated in a national team training camp in June 2011. She played 16 games with the senior national team in 2011 as a member of the team that played in the Chinese hosted Women's 4 Nations Tournament. The 4 nations tournament was her début with the senior national team. In late July 2011 she missed the test series against China played in Queensland because of injury. She was very upset about having to miss the game in front of a home crowd. In the first game, she was the Opals leading scorer with 14 points. In the first game against China, Australia won 73–67. She was named to the 2012 Australia women's national basketball team. She participated in her first training camp with the team in March 2012. The training camp had five sessions over the course of 48 hours. She survived the first cut of players down to 17.

Flanagan also represented Australia at the 2005 World University Games where her team took home a bronze medal.

== See also ==
- WNBL Defensive Player of the Year Award
