= 2014–15 WNBL season =

- League: Women's National Basketball League
- Sport: Basketball
- Duration: 17 October 2014 – 8 March 2015
- Number of teams: 8
- TV partner(s): ABC

Regular season
- Top seed: Townsville Fire
- Season MVP: Abby Bishop Capitals
- Top scorer: Abby Bishop Capitals

Finals
- Champions: Townsville Fire
- Runners-up: Bendigo Spirit
- Finals MVP: Mia Newley Fire

WNBL seasons
- ← 2013–14 2015–16 →

The 2014–15 WNBL season was the 35th season of competition since its establishment in 1981. A total of 8 teams contested the league. The regular season was played between 17 October 2014 and 15 February 2015, followed by a post-season involving the top four on 21 February 2015 until 8 March 2015.

Broadcast rights were held by free-to-air network ABC. ABC broadcast one game a week, at 1:00PM at every standard time in Australia. Regular hosts are John Casey & Rachael Sporn.

Sponsorship included Wattle Valley, entering its second year as league naming rights sponsor. Spalding provided equipment including the official game ball, with Peak supplying team apparel.

== Team standings ==
#	WNBL Championship Ladder				
#	Team	W	L	PCT	GP
1	Townsville Fire	17	5	77.27	22
2	Bendigo Spirit	15	7	68.18	22
3	Dandenong Rangers	12	10	54.55	22
4	Sydney Uni Flames	11	11	50.00	22
5	Canberra Capitals	11	11	50.00	22
6	Melbourne Boomers	11	11	50.00	22
7	Adelaide Lightning	7	15	31.82	22
8	West Coast Waves	4	18	18.18	22

== Finals ==
Semifinals
22 February – Townsville RSL Stadium
Townsville Fire	82
Bendigo Spirit	63
21 February – Dandenong Basketball Stadium
Dandenong Rangers	80
Sydney Uni Flames	89

Preliminary final
1 March – Bendigo Stadium
Bendigo Spirit	85
Sydney Uni Flames	77

Grand final
8 March – Townsville RSL Stadium
Townsville Fire	75
Bendigo Spirit	65

== Statistics ==
=== Individual statistic leaders ===
Category	Player	Team	Statistic
Points per game	Abby Bishop	Canberra Capitals	23.0 PPG
Rebounds per game	Abby Bishop	Canberra Capitals	10.6 RPG
Assists per game	Leilani Mitchell	Sydney Uni Flames	5.9 APG
Steals per game	Rebecca Allen	Melbourne Boomers	1.8 SPG
Blocks per game	Louella Tomlinson	West Coast Waves	2.6 BPG
Three point percentage	Micaela Cocks	Townsville Fire	54.9%
Free throw percentage	Deanna Smith	West Coast Waves	92.5%

== Season award winners ==
=== Player of the Week Award ===
Round #	Player	Team
Round 1	Cayla Francis	Townsville Fire
Round 2	Gabrielle Richards	Bendigo Spirit
Round 3	Tess Madgen	Melbourne Boomers
Round 4	Abby Bishop	Canberra Capitals
Round 5	Leilani Mitchell	Sydney Uni Flames
Round 6	Lindsey Moore	West Coast Waves
Round 7	Abby Bishop (2)	Canberra Capitals
Round 8	Belinda Snell	Bendigo Spirit
Round 9	Suzy Batkovic	Townsville Fire
Round 10	Abby Bishop (3)	Canberra Capitals
Round 11	Penny Taylor	Dandenong Rangers
Round 12	Rebecca Cole	Melbourne Boomers
Round 13	Cayla Francis (2)	Townsville Fire
Round 14	Abby Bishop (4)	Canberra Capitals
Round 15	Gabrielle Richards (2)	Bendigo Spirit
Round 16	Cayla Francis (3)	Townsville Fire
Round 17	Stephanie Talbot	Canberra Capitals

=== Player & Coach of the Month Awards ===
For games played	Player of the Month		Coach of the Month	
For games played	Player	Team	Coach	Team
November 2014	Abby Bishop	Canberra Capitals	Chris Lucas	Townsville Fire
December 2014	Suzy Batkovic	Townsville Fire	Mark Wright	Dandenong Rangers
January 2015	Penny Taylor	Dandenong Rangers	Mark Wright (2)	Dandenong Rangers

=== Postseason awards ===
Award	Winner	Position	Team
Most Valuable Player Award	Abby Bishop	Forward	Canberra Capitals
Grand Final MVP Award	Mia Newley	Guard	Townsville Fire
Rookie of the Year Award	Lauren Scherf	Forward	Dandenong Rangers
Defensive Player of the Year Award	Kelsey Griffin	Forward	Bendigo Spirit
Top Shooter Award	Abby Bishop	Forward	Canberra Capitals
Coach of the Year Award	Shannon Seebohm	Coach	Sydney Uni Flames
All-Star Five	Tess Madgen	Guard	Melbourne Boomers
All-Star Five	Kelsey Griffin	Forward	Bendigo Spirit
All-Star Five	Abby Bishop	Forward	Canberra Capitals
All-Star Five	Penny Taylor	Forward	Dandenong Rangers
All-Star Five	Cayla Francis	Center	Townsville Fire
