= Ashleigh Spencer =

Australian basketball player

Personal information
- Born: 23 October 1992 (age 34) Adelaide, South Australia, Australia
- Listed height: 6 ft 0 in (1.83 m)

Career information
- College: Hannibal–LaGrange (2011–2015)
- Playing career: 2015–present
- Position: Forward

Career history
- 2015–2018: Bendigo Spirit

Ashleigh Spencer (born 23 October 1992) is an Australian basketball player.

== Professional career ==
=== College ===
Spencer played college basketball at Hannibal–LaGrange University in Hannibal, Missouri. Playing for the HLGU Trojans in the National Association of Intercollegiate Athletics (NAIA) as a member of the American Midwest Conference.

=== WNBL ===
Spencer returned home from college and began her professional career in 2015, for the Bendigo Spirit. Spencer has been re-signed for the 2016–17 season, her second consecutive season with the Spirit. Spencer is currently playing for South Adelaide Panthers as of the 2025 season
