= Baloncesto Superior Nacional Femenino =

Women's basketball league in Puerto Rico

Baloncesto Superior Nacional Femenino (BSNF)
- Sport: Basketball
- Founded: 1974
- First season: 1974
- President: Luis G. Miranda Ramos
- Motto: ¡Vive la emoción!
- No. of teams: 8
- Country: Puerto Rico
- Continent: FIBA Americas (Americas)
- Most recent champion: Gigantes de Carolina #17
- Most titles: Gigantes de Carolina (17 titles)
- Broadcaster: DirecTV
- Level on pyramid: 1
- Website: bsnfpr.net

The Baloncesto Superior Nacional Femenino (BSNF) is the top professional women's basketball league in Puerto Rico. In 2023, the president of BSNF said the games would be covered by Telemundo.

== Current teams ==
The current league organization features 8 teams and is in the process of expansion.

Team	Location	Arena	Capacity
Atenienses de Manatí	Manatí, Puerto Rico	Juan Cruz Abreu Coliseum	8,000
Explosivas de Moca	Moca, Puerto Rico	Dr. Juan Sanchez Coliseum	
Santeras de Aguada	Aguada, Puerto Rico	Ismael "Chavalillo" Delgado Coliseum	
Cangrejeras de Santurce	San Juan, Puerto Rico	Roberto Clemente Coliseum	9,000
Indias de Mayagüez	Mayagüez, Puerto Rico	Palacio de Recreación y Deportes	5,500
Gigantes de Carolina	Carolina, Puerto Rico	Guillermo Angulo Coliseum	
Montañeras de Morovis	Morovis, Puerto Rico	José "Pepe" Huyke Coliseum	
Bravas de Cidra	Cidra, Puerto Rico	Juanito Cabello Court	

Locations of announced teams participating in 2021 BSNF season

== List of BSNF champions ==
Season	Champions	Runners-up
2024	Cangrejeras de Santurce	Gigantes de Carolina
2025	Explosivas de Moca	Atenienses de Manatí

== See also ==
- Puerto Rico women's national basketball team
- Baloncesto Superior Nacional
