= Vanessa Panousis =

Australian basketball player (born 1995)

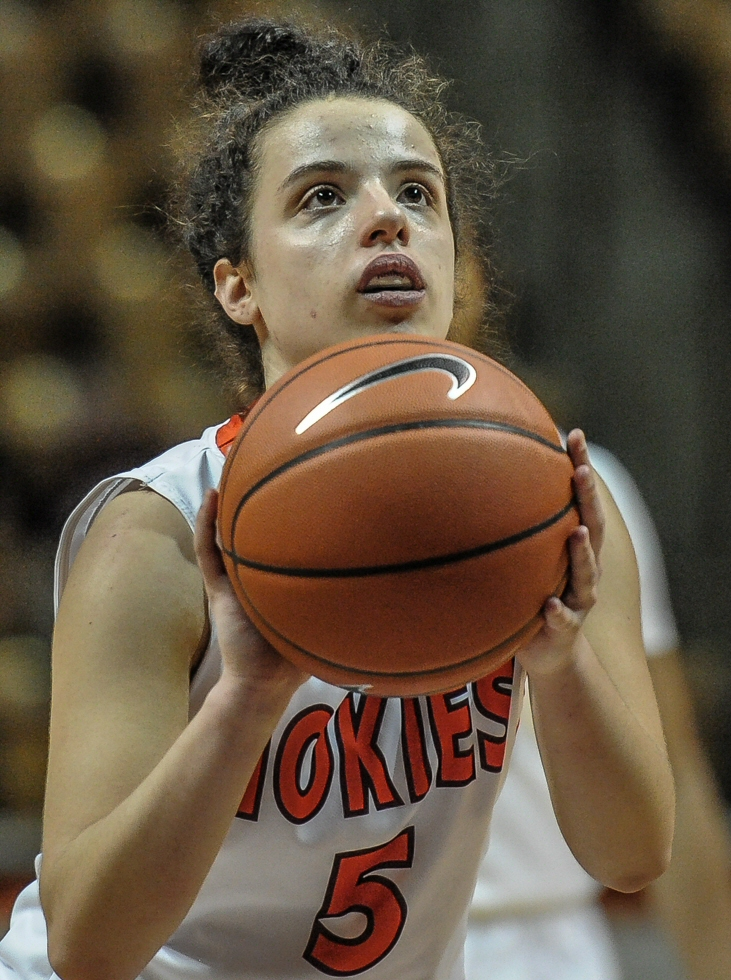
- Panousis in 2013 playing for Virginia Tech

Personal information
- Born: 23 February 1995 (age 31) Darlinghurst, New South Wales
- Listed height: 5 ft 7 in (1.70 m)

Career information
- High school: Brigidine College (Randwick, New South Wales)
- College: Virginia Tech (2013–2017)
- Playing career: 2012–present
- Position: Guard

Career history
- 2012–2013: Sydney Uni Flames
- 2017–2018: Adelaide Lightning
- 2018–2019: Sydney Uni Flames

Career highlights
- 2× ACC All-Academic Team (2015, 2016)
Medals
Representing Australia
Basketball
Summer Universiade
Gold medal – first place	2017 Taiwan	Team
FIBA U-19 World Championship
Bronze medal – third place	2013 Lithuania	Team
FIBA U-16 Oceania Championship
Gold medal – first place	2011 Australia	Team

Vanessa Vassiliki Panousis (born 23 February 1995) is an Australian professional basketball player.

== Career ==
=== College ===
Panousis played college basketball for the Virginia Tech Hokies in Blacksburg, Virginia in the Atlantic Coast Conference. She had a very successful college career. Being named to the ACC All-Academic Team twice. She was also known to the ACC All-Tournament Second Team in her sophomore year, alongside the likes of eventual No. 1 pick in the 2015 WNBA draft, Jewell Loyd.

=== Virginia Tech statistics ===
Ratios
Year	Team	GP	FG%	3P%	FT%	RBG	APG	BPG	SPG	PPG
2013-14	Virginia Tech	30	36.4%	32.8%	81.3%	3.07	4.03	0.10	0.33	12.43
2014-15	Virginia Tech	31	32.5%	28.3%	88.9%	3.13	3.19	0.03	0.71	13.45
2015-16	Virginia Tech	32	30.7%	31.7%	90.3%	2.16	1.91	0.06	0.41	8.59
2016-17	Virginia Tech	34	32.9%	31.1%	82.5%	2.41	1.77	0.06	0.29	9.24
Career		127	33.1%	30.7%	84.6%	2.68	2.69	0.06	0.43	10.86

Totals
Year	Team	GP	FG	FGA	3P	3PA	FT	FTA	REB	A	BK	ST	PTS
2013-14	Virginia Tech	30	114	313	58	177	87	107	92	121	3	10	373
2014-15	Virginia Tech	31	142	437	77	272	56	63	97	99	1	22	417
2015-16	Virginia Tech	32	92	300	63	199	28	31	69	61	2	13	275
2016-17	Virginia Tech	34	105	319	71	228	33	40	82	60	2	10	314
Career		127	453	1369	269	876	204	241	340	341	8	55	1379

=== WNBL ===
Panousis was a development player with the Sydney Uni Flames for the 2012–13 WNBL season. After finishing her college career, Panousis has been signed by the Adelaide Lightning for the 2017–18 WNBL season. There she will join the likes of Laura Hodges and Abby Bishop.

== National team ==
=== Youth Level ===
Panousis made her international debut for the Sapphires at the 2011 FIBA Oceania Under-16 Championship in Canberra, Australia. She would once again represent the Sapphires at the 2012 Under-17 World Championship in Amsterdam, Netherlands, where Australia placed 5th. Panousis would then represent the Gems at the Under-19 World Championship in Lithuania the following year, where they finished in third place and took home the bronze medal. She also represented Australia at the 2015 Summer Universiade in Gwangju, South Korea, where they placed 5th.
