= Heather Oliver =

Australian basketball player

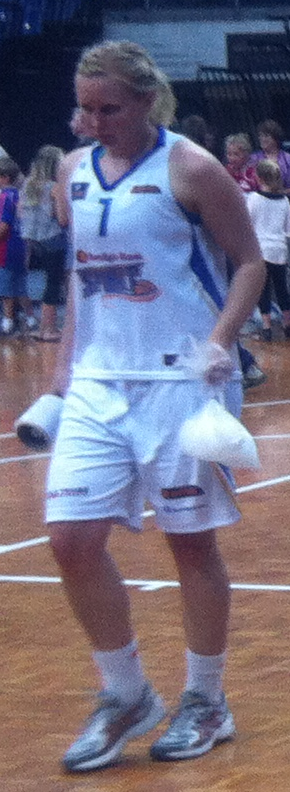

Personal information
- Born: 2 September 1987 (age 39) Adelaide, South Australia, Australia
- Listed height: 5 ft 10 in (1.78 m)

Career information
- College: Southern California (2007–2010)
- Playing career: 2010–2018
- Position: Guard

Career history
- 2010–2012: Bendigo Spirit
- 2013–2018: Bendigo Spirit

Career highlights
- WNBL champion (2014)
Medals
Representing Australia
Basketball
FIBA U21 World Championship
Silver medal – second place	2007 Moscow	Team

Heather Helen Oliver (born 2 September 1987) was an Australian professional basketball player.

== Professional career ==
=== College ===
Oliver played her freshman season and college debut with Central Arizona College. Where she was one of two freshmen to earn NJCCA First Team honours and was named to NJCCA Championship All-Tournament Team. After a successful freshman season, Oliver found herself joining the USC Trojans in NCAA Division I. During her time there, she twice received All-Pac-10 Defensive Honourable Mention.

=== WNBL ===
Oliver returned home from college to Victoria and began her professional career in 2010, for the Bendigo Spirit. After two seasons with the Spirit, Oliver took a one-year break from the league. She then returned to the Spirit roster and helped them take home the championship in 2014. Oliver has been re-signed for the 2016–17 season. After seven seasons in the league, Oliver announced her retirement from professional basketball in June 2018.
