= Nadeen Payne =

Australian basketball player

No. 12 – Townsville Fire
- Position: Forward
- League: WNBL

Personal information
- Born: 7 June 1993 (age 33) Townsville, Queensland, Australia
- Listed height: 6 ft 2 in (1.88 m)

Career information
- Playing career: 2009–present

Career history
- 2009–2010: Australian Institute of Sport
- 2010–2012: Townsville Fire
- 2012–2014: Adelaide Lightning
- 2015–2016: South East Queensland Stars
- 2016–2019: Bendigo Spirit
- 2019–2020: Perth Lynx
- 2020–present: Townsville Fire

Nadeen Payne (born 7 June 1993) is an Australian professional basketball player. She currently plays for the Townsville Fire in the WNBL.

== Career ==
=== WNBL ===
Payne began her WNBL career with the Australian Institute of Sport. She would then return home and play for her home side, Townsville Fire. This was followed by two seasons with the Adelaide Lightning. After a year away from the game, Payne returned with the new look South East Queensland Stars. After the Stars became defunct, Payne was signed by the Bendigo Spirit for 2016–17. Payne will re-join the Spirit for a second consecutive season, after signing on for 2017–18. Payne joined the Perth Lynx for the 2019-20 WNBL Season.

=== National team ===
Payne first represented Australia at the 2010 Under-17 World Championship in France where Australia placed seventh. She would once again represent Australia, this time for the Gems at the 2011 Under-19 World Championship in Chile where they narrowly missed out on the bronze medal, placing fourth.
