= 2012–13 WNBL season =

- League: Women's National Basketball League
- Sport: Basketball
- Duration: 5 October 2012 – 10 March 2013
- Number of teams: 9
- TV partner(s): ABC

Regular season
- Top seed: Bendigo Spirit
- Season MVP: Suzy Batkovic Adelaide
- Top scorer: Suzy Batkovic Adelaide

Finals
- Champions: Bendigo Spirit
- Runners-up: Townsville Fire
- Finals MVP: Kelsey Griffin Bendigo

WNBL seasons
- ← 2011–12 2013–14 →

The 2012–13 WNBL season was the 33rd season of competition since the Women's National Basketball League's establishment in 1981. A total of nine teams contested the league. The regular season was played between 5 October 2012 and 16 February 2013, followed by a post-season involving the top five on 23 February 2013 until 10 March 2013.

Broadcast rights were held by free-to-air network ABC. ABC broadcast one game a week, at 3 pm at every standard time in Australia.

Spalding provided equipment including the official game ball, with Champion supplying team apparel.

== Team standings ==
#	WNBL Championship Ladder				
#	Team	W	L	PCT	GP
1	Bendigo Spirit	21	3	87.5	24
2	Dandenong Rangers	19	5	79.2	24
3	Adelaide Lightning	18	6	75.0	24
4	Townsville Fire	13	11	54.2	24
5	Bulleen Boomers	10	14	41.7	24
6	Logan Thunder	8	16	33.3	24
7	Sydney Uni Flames	8	16	33.3	24
8	Canberra Capitals	7	17	29.2	24
9	West Coast Waves	4	20	16.7	24

== Finals ==
Semifinals
Bendigo Spirit	78
Dandenong Rangers	71
Adelaide Lightning	53
Townsville Fire	60

Preliminary final
Dandenong Rangers	64
Townsville Fire	78

Grand final
Bendigo Spirit	71
Townsville Fire	57

== Season award winners ==
Award	Winner	Position	Team
Most Valuable Player Award	(Australia) Suzy Batkovic	Forward/Centre	Adelaide Lightning
Grand Final MVP Award	(United States) Kelsey Griffin	Forward	Bendigo Spirit
Rookie of the Year Award	(Australia) Stephanie Talbot	Guard	Adelaide Lightning
Defensive Player of the Year Award	(Australia) Kristi Harrower	Guard	Bendigo Spirit
Coach of the Year Award	(Australia) Bernie Harrower	Coach	Bendigo Spirit
Top Shooter Award	(Australia) Suzy Batkovic	Forward/Centre	Adelaide Lightning
All-Star Five	(Australia) Kristi Harrower (Australia) Kathleen MacLeod (Australia) Jenna O'Hea (Australia) Suzy Batkovic (Australia) Gabrielle Richards	Guard; Guard; Guard/Forward; Forward/Centre; Centre	Bendigo Spirit; Dandenong Rangers; Dandenong Rangers; Adelaide Lightning; Bendigo Spirit

== Statistics leaders ==
Category	Player	Team	GP	Totals	Average
Points Per Game	(Australia) Suzy Batkovic	Adelaide Lightning	19	405	21.3
Rebounds Per Game	(Australia) Suzy Batkovic	Adelaide Lightning	19	186	9.7
Assists Per Game	(Australia) Kristi Harrower	Bendigo Spirit	24	169	6.5
Steals Per Game	(United States) Kelsey Griffin	Bendigo Spirit	17	31	1.8
Blocks per game	(Australia) Suzy Batkovic	Adelaide Lightning	19	50	2.6
Field Goal %	(Australia) Laura Hodges	Adelaide Lightning	19	(108/190)	56.8%
Three-Point Field Goal %	(Australia) Alicia Poto	Sydney Uni Flames	23	(49/105)	46.7%
Free Throw %	(Australia) Katie-Rae Ebzery	Sydney Uni Flames	24	(84/95)	88.4%
