= Kate Gaze =

Australian basketball player

No. 11 – Townsville Fire
- Position: Guard
- League: WNBL

Personal information
- Born: 18 February 1990 (age 36) Mulgrave, Victoria
- Listed height: 5 ft 8 in (1.73 m)

Career information
- High school: Endeavour (Sydney, New South Wales)
- College: Saint Mary's (2009–2014)
- WNBA draft: 2014: undrafted
- Playing career: 2006–present

Career history
- 2006–2009: Australian Institute of Sport
- 2014–2016: Townsville Fire
- 2016–2018: Canberra Capitals
- 2019–present: Townsville Fire

Career highlights
- 3x WNBL champion (2015, 2016, 2023); WCC All-Freshman Team (2010)

Kate Gaze (born 18 February 1990) is an Australian professional basketball player. She currently plays for the Townsville Fire in the WNBL.

== Career ==
=== College ===
From 2009–2014, Gaze played for the Saint Mary's Gaels located in Moraga, California. Participating in the NCAA's Division I and primarily in the West Coast Conference.

=== St. Mary's statistics ===
Ratios
| Year | Team | GP | FG% | 3P% | FT% | RBG | APG | BPG | SPG | PPG |
|---|---|---|---|---|---|---|---|---|---|---|
| 2009-10 | St. Mary's | 31 | 32.0% | 33.8% | 90.0% | 1.61 | 1.61 | 0.10 | 0.45 | 4.39 |
| 2010-11 | St. Mary's | 32 | 37.2% | 42.4% | 86.5% | 2.84 | 1.94 | 0.13 | 0.56 | 11.00 |
| 2011-12 | St. Mary's | 8 | 36.2% | 37.8% | 77.8% | 2.00 | 3.25 | 0.25 | 0.88 | 7.88 |
| 2012-13 | St. Mary's | 31 | 36.9% | 31.5% | 72.3% | 2.42 | 2.90 | - | 0.68 | 11.03 |
| 2013-14 | St. Mary's | 33 | 34.0% | 32.6% | 87.4% | 3.39 | 4.85 | 0.15 | 0.82 | 12.42 |
| Career | | 135 | 35.5% | 35.4% | 83.2% | 2.55 | 2.87 | 0.10 | 0.64 | 9.65 |

Totals
| Year | Team | GP | FG | FGA | 3P | 3PA | FT | FTA | REB | A | BK | ST | PTS |
|---|---|---|---|---|---|---|---|---|---|---|---|---|---|
| 2009-10 | St. Mary's | 31 | 41 | 128 | 27 | 80 | 27 | 30 | 50 | 50 | 3 | 14 | 136 |
| 2010-11 | St. Mary's | 32 | 103 | 277 | 56 | 132 | 90 | 104 | 91 | 62 | 4 | 18 | 352 |
| 2011-12 | St. Mary's | 8 | 21 | 58 | 14 | 37 | 7 | 9 | 16 | 26 | 2 | 7 | 63 |
| 2012-13 | St. Mary's | 31 | 115 | 312 | 39 | 124 | 73 | 101 | 75 | 90 | 0 | 21 | 342 |
| 2013-14 | St. Mary's | 33 | 120 | 353 | 45 | 138 | 125 | 143 | 112 | 160 | 5 | 27 | 410 |
| Career | | 135 | 400 | 1128 | 181 | 511 | 322 | 387 | 344 | 388 | 14 | 87 | 1303 |

=== WNBL ===
After a successful college career in the United States, Gaze returned home to Australia and reignited her professional career with the Townsville Fire. She has since won two WNBL Championships, led by Suzy Batkovic and Cayla George. She has been re-signed for the 2017–18 season with the Capitals. From January through March 2018 she played professionally overseas for the BVUK. Sharks Wuerzburg in Germany's 2. division.

== Personal life ==
Gaze, comes from an athletic background. Her father Mark represented Australia in basketball at the 1982 FIBA World Championship and played 182 National Basketball League games from 1983–1991. Her mother Michelle O'Connor was a WNBL champion with the Coburg Cougars, and her grandfather Tony Gaze was a former Australian Opals coach. She is also related to Australian basketball legends Andrew Gaze (first cousin, once removed) and his father Lindsay Gaze (great-uncle).
