= Kara Tessari =

Australian basketball player

Personal information
- Born: 18 March 1999 (age 27) Monegeetta, Victoria
- Listed height: 5 ft 5 in (1.65 m)

Career information
- High school: Assumption (Kilmore, Victoria)
- Playing career: 2016–2023
- Position: Guard

Career history
- 2016–2017: Bulleen Boomers
- 2017–2020: Bendigo Spirit
- 2018: Bendigo Braves
- 2019: Kilsyth Cobras
- 2021–2022: Knox Raiders
- 2023: Diamond Valley Eagles

Career highlights
- NBL1 champion (2019); SEABL champion (2018)

Kara Tessari (born 18 March 1999) is an Australian former basketball player.

== Playing career ==
In 2016, Tessari played for the Bulleen Boomers in the Big V.

In January 2017, Tessari joined the Bendigo Spirit for the rest of the 2016–17 WNBL season.

After a second season with Bulleen in 2017, Tessari re-joined the Spirit for the 2017–18 WNBL season.

In 2018, Tessari helped the Bendigo Braves win the SEABL championship. After a third season with the Spirit in 2018–19, she helped the Kilsyth Cobras win the inaugural NBL1 championship in 2019. She played a fourth season for the Spirit in 2019–20.

In 2021 and 2022, Tessari played for the Knox Raiders in the NBL1 South. She joined the Diamond Valley Eagles for the 2023 NBL1 South season.
