= Mia Murray =

Australian basketball player

Personal information
- Born: 4 August 1988 (age 38) Bedford Park, South Australia, Australia
- Listed height: 184 cm (6 ft 0 in)

Career information
- Playing career: 2005–2023
- Position: Forward

Career history
- 2005–2008: Australian Institute of Sport
- 2008–2011: Adelaide Lightning
- 2011–2018: Townsville Fire
- 2020–2022: Townsville Fire
- 2022–2023: Melbourne Boomers

Career highlights
- 3× WNBL champion (2015, 2016, 2018); WNBL Grand Final MVP (2015); NBL1 North champion (2022); No. 10 retired by Townsville Fire
Medals
World University Games
Bronze medal – third place	2009 Games	Team competition
Bronze medal – third place	2011 Games	Team competition

Mia Suzanne Murray (née Newley; born 4 August 1988) is an Australian former professional basketball player. She played 16 seasons in the Women's National Basketball League (WNBL), winning three championships with the Townsville Fire.

== Professional career ==
Murray debuted in the Women's National Basketball League (WNBL) in the 2005–06 season for the Australian Institute of Sport (AIS). After three seasons for the AIS, she played for the Adelaide Lightning (2008–2011), Townsville Fire (2011–2018; 2020–2022), and Melbourne Boomers (2022–2023). She played 207 games for the Fire and won three WNBL championships alongside the grand final MVP in 2015.

In February 2024, the Townsville Fire retired Murray's number 10 jersey.

== National team career ==
Murray represented Australia at both junior and senior levels. She played for Australia at the 2007 World Championship for Junior Women and won bronze at the 2009 and 2011 World University Games.

== Personal life ==
She began going by her married name, Mia Murray, in 2015.

Murray's brother, Brad Newley, is also a professional basketball player.
