= 2013–14 WNBL season =

- League: Women's National Basketball League
- Sport: Basketball
- Duration: 4 October 2013 – 9 March 2014
- Number of teams: 9
- TV partner(s): ABC

Regular season
- Top seed: Bendigo Spirit
- Season MVP: Suzy Batkovic Fire
- Top scorer: Jenna O'Hea Rangers

Finals
- Champions: Bendigo Spirit
- Runners-up: Townsville Fire
- Finals MVP: Kelsey Griffin Spirit

WNBL seasons
- ← 2012–13 2014–15 →

The 2013–14 WNBL season was the 34th season of the Australian Women's National Basketball League (WNBL) competition since the league's establishment in 1981. A total of 9 teams contested the league. The regular season was played between 4 October 2013 and 15 February 2014, followed by a post-season involving the top five from 22 February 2014 until 9 March 2014. Bendigo Spirit finished the regular season as minor premiers and defeated Townsville Fire to claim back-to-back championships.

Broadcast rights were held by free-to-air network ABC. ABC broadcast one game a week, at 3pm at every standard time in Australia.

Sponsorship included Wattle Valley, entering its first year as league naming rights sponsor. Spalding provided equipment including the official game ball, with Champion supplying team apparel.

== Team standings ==
| # | WNBL Championship Ladder | | | | |
| # | Team | W | L | PCT | GP |
|---|---|---|---|---|---|
| 1 | Bendigo Spirit | 22 | 2 | 91.7 | 24 |
| 2 | Dandenong Rangers | 16 | 8 | 66.6 | 24 |
| 3 | Townsville Fire | 16 | 8 | 66.6 | 24 |
| 4 | Melbourne Boomers | 14 | 10 | 58.3 | 24 |
| 5 | Adelaide Lightning | 12 | 12 | 50 | 24 |
| 6 | Sydney Uni Flames | 10 | 14 | 41.7 | 24 |
| 7 | Canberra Capitals | 10 | 14 | 41.7 | 24 |
| 8 | Logan Thunder | 7 | 17 | 29.2 | 24 |
| 9 | West Coast Waves | 1 | 23 | 4.2 | 24 |

== Finals ==
Semifinals
Bendigo Spirit | 71
Dandenong Rangers | 62
Townsville Fire | 78
Melbourne Boomers | 73

Preliminary final
Dandenong Rangers | 71
Townsville Fire | 74

Grand final
9 March 2014 – Bendigo Stadium
Bendigo Spirit | 94
Townsville Fire | 83

== Season award winners ==
| Award | Winner | Position | Team |
|---|---|---|---|
| Most Valuable Player Award | Suzy Batkovic | Forward / Centre | Townsville Fire |
| Grand Final MVP Award | Kelsey Griffin | Forward | Bendigo Spirit |
| Rookie of the Year Award | Alex Wilson | Guard | Townsville Fire |
| Defensive Player of the Year Award | Rebecca Allen | Forward | Melbourne Boomers |
| Top Shooter Award | Jenna O'Hea | Guard / Forward | Dandenong Rangers |
| Coach of the Year Award | Guy Molloy | Coach | Melbourne Boomers |
| All-Star Five | Leilani Mitchell | Guard | Dandenong Rangers |
| All-Star Five | Jenna O'Hea | Guard / Forward | Dandenong Rangers |
| All-Star Five | Laura Hodges | Forward | Adelaide Lightning |
| All-Star Five | Gabrielle Richards | Forward | Bendigo Spirit |
| All-Star Five | Suzy Batkovic | Forward / Centre | Townsville Fire |
