= Abigail Wehrung =

Australian basketball player

Personal information
- Born: 28 December 1995 (age 30) Daylesford, Victoria
- Listed height: 5 ft 10 in (1.78 m)

Career information
- Playing career: 2014–present
- Position: Guard

Career history
- 2014–2018: Canberra Capitals
- 2018–2020: Bendigo Spirit
- 2020–2022: Adelaide Lightning
- 2024–present: Bendigo Spirit

Career highlights
- WNBL champion (2025)
Medals
Representing Australia
Women's basketball
FIBA Asia Cup
Bronze medal – third place	2021 Jordan
Summer Universiade
Gold medal – first place	2017 Taiwan	Team
Gold medal – first place	2019 Italy	Team
FIBA U16 Oceania Championship
Gold medal – first place	2011 Australia	Team

Abigail Wehrung (born 28 December 1995) is an Australian professional basketball player.

== Career ==
=== WNBL ===
Wehrung began her professional career in 2014, for the Canberra Capitals. Wehrung was re-signed for the 2016–17 season, her third consecutive season with the Capitals. After strong showings throughout her 2016–17 season, Wehrung was re-signed for the 2017–18 season. Abbey is playing for Bendigo Spirit in the WNBL summer 2019 season.

In October 2020, Wehrung signed with the Adelaide Lightning for the 2020 season.

=== NBL1 ===
In 2026, Wehrung was named All-NBL1 South Second Team while playing for the Ballarat Miners.

== National team ==
=== Youth level ===
Wehrung made her international debut at the 2011 FIBA U16 Oceania Championship where she helped Australia take gold and qualify for the World Championship the following year. Wehrung represented Australia at the 2012 FIBA U17 World Championship in Amsterdam, Netherlands. Australia came in fifth place.
