= Laura Hodges =

Australian basketball player (born 1983)

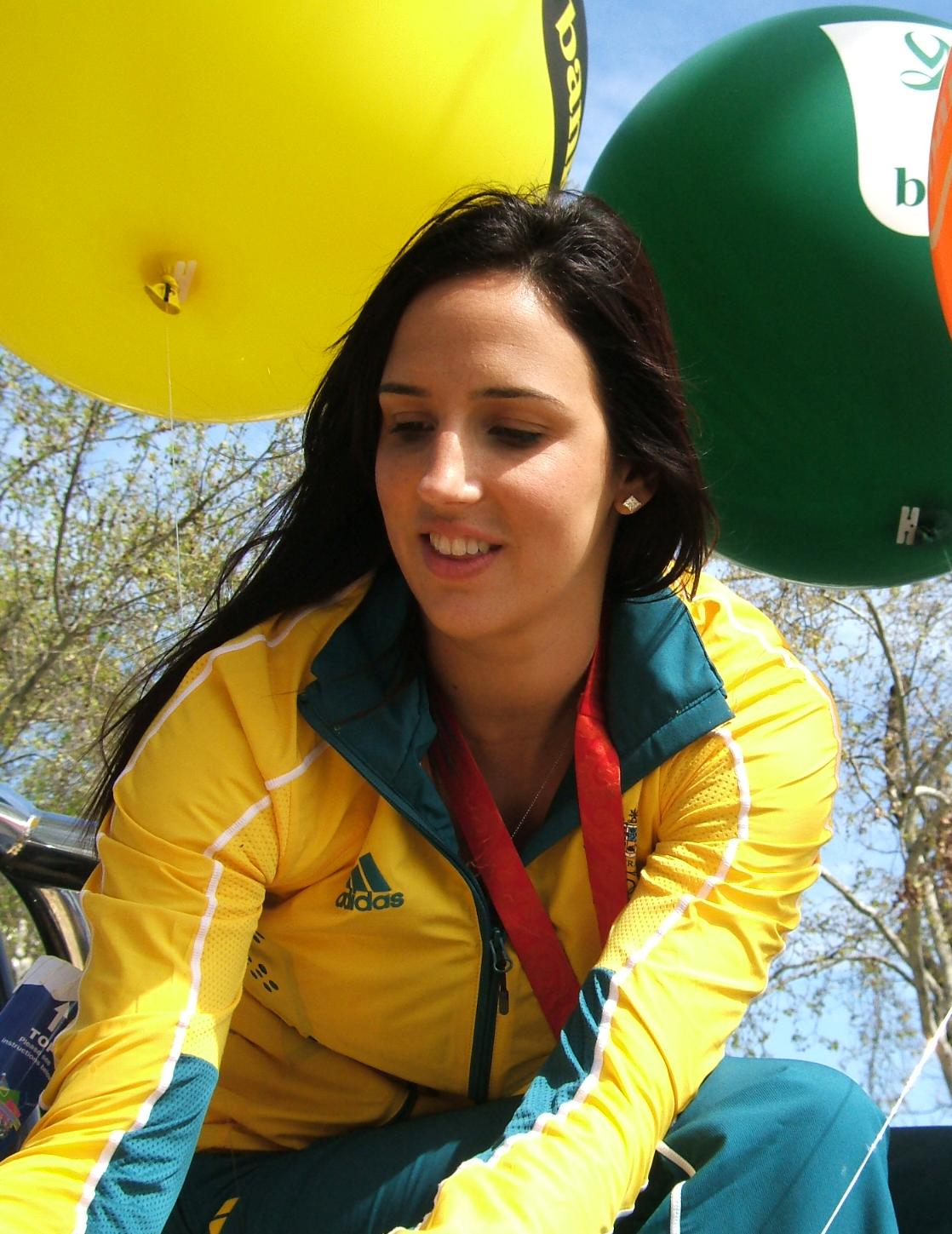

Personal information
- Born: 13 December 1983 (age 42) Adelaide, South Australia, Australia
- Listed height: 188 cm (6 ft 2 in)
- Listed weight: 167 lb (76 kg)

Career information
- Playing career: 2000–2017
- Position: Forward

Career history
- 2000–2002: Australian Institute of Sport
- 2002–2006: Adelaide Lightning
- 2005–2006: Connecticut Sun
- 2006–2008: Taranto Cras Basket
- 2008–2010: Basket Parma
- 2010–2012: Geas Basket
- 2012–2014: Adelaide Lightning
- 2014–2016: Bourges Basket
- 2016–2017: Adelaide Lightning
- Stats at WNBA.com
- Stats at Basketball Reference
Medals
Representing Australia
Olympic Games
Silver medal – second place	2004 Athens	Team
Silver medal – second place	2008 Beijing	Team
Bronze medal – third place	2012 London	Team
World Championships
Gold medal – first place	2006 Brazil
Bronze medal – third place	2014 Turkey
FIBA Asia Cup
Silver medal – second place	2017 India
Commonwealth Games
Gold medal – first place	2006 Melbourne	Team competition

Laura Ann Hodges (née Summerton; born 13 December 1983) is an Australian female professional basketball player, having played in Australia's Women's National Basketball League (WNBL), Europe, and the WNBA. She currently plays for the Adelaide Lightning in the WNBL. She currently sits on the board of the Australian Basketball Players’ Association

She has been a member of Australia women's national basketball team, winning a pair of silver medals with the team at the 2004 Summer Olympics, 2008 Summer Olympics and a bronze at the 2012 Summer Olympics. She won a gold medal at the 2006 Commonwealth Games and 2006 World Championships.

== Personal ==
Hodges was born on 13 December 1983 in Adelaide, South Australia. Hodges is a 188 cm (6 ft 2 in) tall Forward. She was a student in 2006, and attended Jennifer Screen's 30 June 2007 wedding in Adelaide. Her married last name is Hodges.

== Basketball ==
As a competitor at the 2002 Australian Under-20 national championships, Hodges won the Bob Staunton Award as the player of the tournament. In 2003, she was described as one of the best young talents in the country.

=== Professional basketball ===
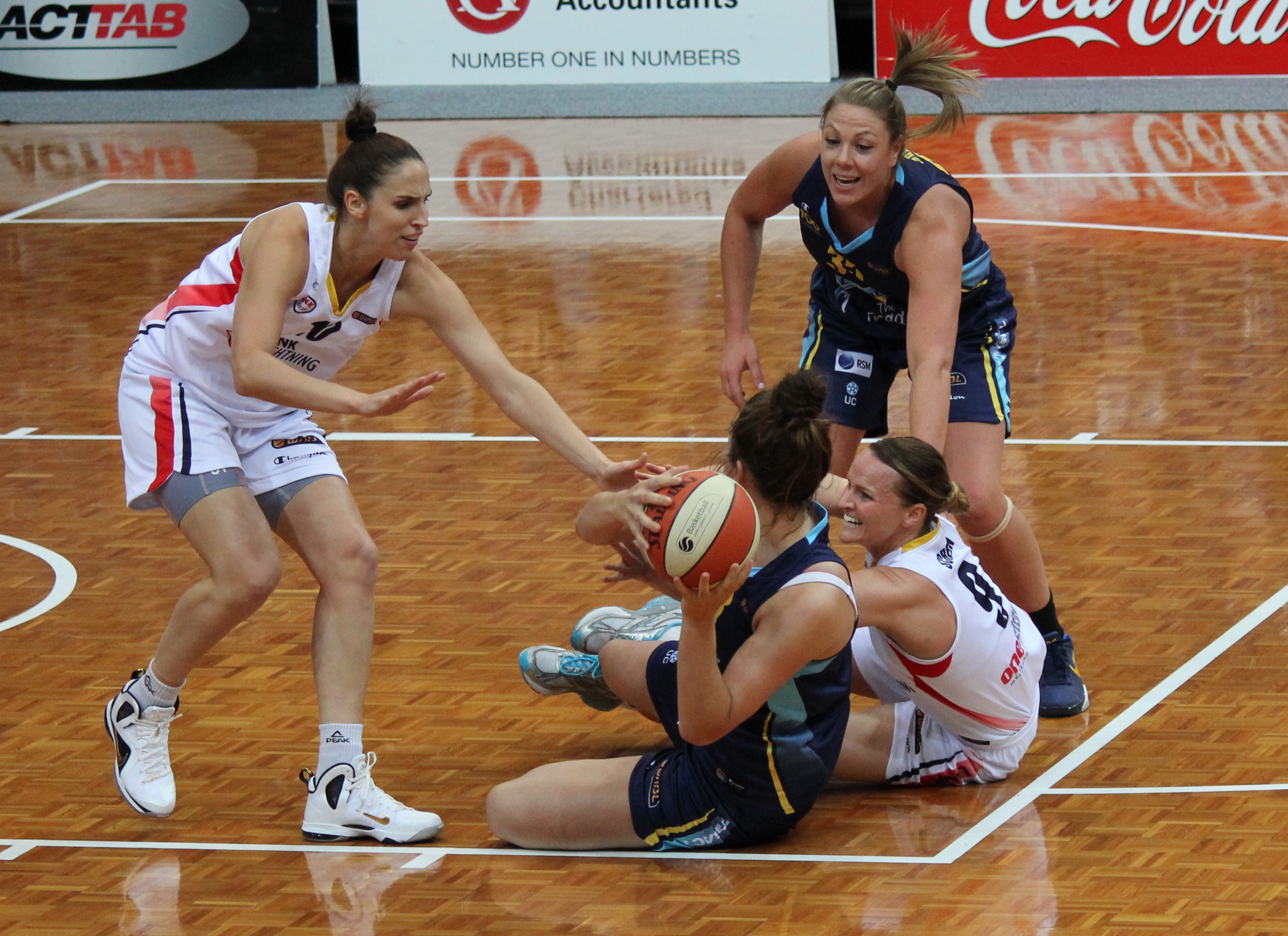
Hodges in action for the Lightning against the Canberra Capitals

Hodges is a professional basketball player. She has played in Australia's WNBL, Europe, and the WNBA.

Hodges had a scholarship with and played for the Australian Institute of Sport in 2000 and 2001. At the end of the season 2000/2001 season, she was voted the NBL Rookie of the Year. She played 44 games for the Australian Institute of Sport team. She played in the WNBL in the 2002/2003 season for the Adelaide Lightning and was with the team up to the 2005/2006 season. Between 2001/2002 and 2005/2006, she had 85 caps with the team. From her start with AIS until the end of 2005/2006 WNBL season, she averaged 14.8 points a game, 6.5 rebounds a game and 1.9 assists a game.

Hodges has played for the Italian side Basket Parma. She played for Bracco Geas in Italy from 2010 to 2012, where she wore jersey number 11. In the 2011/2012 season, she played 24 games, averaging 28.7 minutes a game, 9.4 points a game, shot 67.4% from the free throw line, 49.7% from the 2-point field goal range and 35.1% from the three-point field goal range.

Hodges played for the Connecticut Sun in the WNBA and was with the team during the 2006 season.

=== National team ===
Hodges has represented Australia on the Junior, Young and Senior levels.

As a member of the 2000 Australia Junior Women's Team, Hodges won a gold medal at the World Qualification Series. She was a member of the Australian Junior Women's Team that competed at the 2001 World Championships in the Czech Republic. In 2002, she was a member of the Australian Junior Women's Team that won a gold medal in the World Qualification Series. In 2003, she was a member of the Australian Young Women's Team that competed at the World Championships in Croatia.

Hodges was a member of the Australian Opals that won a silver medal in the 2002 World Championships in Spain. She was viewed by national team coaches in 2003 as an emerging talent alongside other players like Lauren Jackson, Penny Taylor, and Hollie Grima. That year, she was a member of the team that competed in the Oceania Championship Series. She went on to represent Australia on the basketball team at the 2004 Summer Olympics where she won a silver medal.

Hodges was a member of the 2005 Opals. She stayed on the roster in 2006, winning a gold medal with the team at the Commonwealth Games, wearing number 11. That year, she was also part of the team that took home a gold medal at the World Championships in Brazil. In March 2007, Summerton was named to the national team what would prepare for the 2008 Summer Olympics. She stayed on the roster, went to the games and earned a silver medal.

Hodges was viewed by national team coach Carrie Graf in June 2010 as one of a quartet of strong players that would represent Australia in a tour of China, the United States and Europe. In July 2010, she participated in a four-day training camp and one game test match against the United States in Connecticut. She was named to the 2012 Australia women's national basketball team. She was scheduled to participate in the national team training camp held from 14 to 18 May 2012 at the Australian Institute of Sport. She was part of the Australian team that won the bronze medal.

== Career statistics ==
Legend
GP	Games played	GS	Games started	MPG	Minutes per game	RPG	Rebounds per game
APG	Assists per game	SPG	Steals per game	BPG	Blocks per game	PPG	Points per game
TO	Turnovers per game	FG%	Field-goal percentage	3P%	3-point field-goal percentage	FT%	Free-throw percentage
**Bold**	Career best	°	League leader

=== WNBA ===
==== Regular season ====
WNBA regular season statistics
Year	Team	GP	GS	MPG	FG%	3P%	FT%	RPG	APG	SPG	BPG	TO	PPG
2005	Connecticut	11	0	3.9	.333	—	**.800**	0.9	0.3	**0.2**	0.0	**0.4**	0.9
2006	Connecticut	**33**	**3**	**10.9**	**.432**	**.200**	.593	**1.1**	**0.6**	0.1	**0.1**	0.6	**2.5**
**Career**	2 years, 1 team	44	3	9.1	.422	.200	.625	1.0	0.5	0.1	0.0	0.5	2.1

==== Playoffs ====
WNBA playoff statistics
Year	Team	GP	GS	MPG	FG%	3P%	FT%	RPG	APG	SPG	BPG	TO	PPG
2005	Connecticut	**2**	0	1.0	—	—	—	0.0	0.0	0.0	0.0	**0.0**	0.0
2006	Connecticut	**2**	0	**3.5**	**.500**	—	—	**0.5**	0.0	0.0	0.0	**0.0**	1.0
**Career**	2 years, 1 team	4	0	2.3	.500	—	—	0.3	0.0	0.0	0.0	0.0	0.5

== See also ==
- List of Australian WNBA players
- WNBL Rookie of the Year Award
