= Gabrielle Richards =

Australian basketball player

- Richards in 2012 while with the Bendigo Spirit

Personal information
- Born: 19 November 1984 (age 41) Melbourne, Victoria
- Listed height: 6 ft 2 in (1.88 m)

Career information
- High school: Assumption (Kilmore, Victoria)
- College: Oregon (2004–2007)
- Playing career: 2002–2020
- Position: Forward/Center
- Number: 20

Career history
- 2002–2004: Australian Institute of Sport
- 2007–2018: Bendigo Spirit
- 2019–2020: Bendigo Spirit

Career highlights
- 2x WNBL Champion (2013, 2014); 2x All-WNBL Team (2013, 2014)
Medals
Representing Australia
Basketball
FIBA World Championship
| Bronze medal – third place | 2014 Turkey | Team |

Gabrielle Richards (born 19 November 1984) is an Australian professional basketball player.

== Career ==
=== WNBL ===
Richards began her WNBL career with the Australian Institute of Sport. She would then return to Victoria and play for the newest franchise, the Bendigo Spirit. During her time with the Spirit, Richards has won two WNBL Championships alongside the likes of Kristi Harrower and Kelsey Griffin. Richards is also a two-time awardee to the WNBL All-Star Five. Richards returned to the Spirit for her tenth season, after signing on for 2017–18.

== National team ==
=== Youth Level ===
Richards first represented Australia at the 2003 Under-21 World Championship in Croatia where Australia placed fifth. Playing alongside Laura Hodges, Jess Foley, Samantha Richards and Kelly Wilson.

=== Senior Level ===
Richards was a long standing squad member of the Opals, but was unable to make the final team for competition. At the 2014 FIBA World Championship, Liz Cambage was ruled out from the squad due to injury. Therefore, Richards was awarded the call up and rounded out the Opals roster under head coach, Brendan Joyce. Richards took to the floor in five out of Australia's six matches, including the Bronze Medal match where Australia defeated tournament hosts, Turkey.
