= WNBL statistical leaders =

Annual leaders in the WNBL

After each season, the WNBL recognises the league leaders of each statistical category.

== Statistical leaders ==
=== Points ===
Main article: WNBL Leading Scorer Award

Year	Player	Points	PPG	Nationality	Team
1981	Julie Nykiel	288	22.1	Australia	Noarlunga Tigers
1982	Karen Ogden	410	24.1	Australia	St Kilda Saints
1983	Julie Nykiel (2)	398	23.4	Australia	Noarlunga Tigers
1984	Julie Nykiel (3)	227	25.2	Australia	Noarlunga Tigers
1985	Julie Nykiel (4)	297	19.8	Australia	Noarlunga Tigers
1986	Karin Maar	500	20.0	Australia	Coburg Cougars
1987	Kathy Foster	415	20.8	Australia	Hobart Islanders
1988	Julie Nykiel (5)	452	21.5	Australia	Noarlunga Tigers
1989	Kathy Foster (2)	517	20.7	Australia	Hobart Islanders
1990	Debbie Slimmon	553	22.1	Australia	Bulleen Melbourne Boomers
1991	Joanne Metcalfe	479	21.8	Australia	Melbourne Tigers
1992	Jodie Murphy	376	17.9	Australia	Canberra Capitals
1993	Samantha Thornton	359	18.9	Australia	Dandenong Rangers
1994	Sandy Brondello; Shelley Gorman	340; 340	20.0; 20.0	Australia; Australia	Brisbane Blazers; Sydney Flames
1995	Sandy Brondello (2)	357	19.8	Australia	Brisbane Blazers
1996	Gina Stevens	375	20.8	Australia	Perth Breakers
1997	Rachael Sporn	429	21.5	Australia	Adelaide Lightning
1998	Allison Cook	232	19.3	Australia	Bulleen Melbourne Boomers
1998–99	Lauren Jackson	463	23.2	Australia	Australian Institute of Sport
1999–00	Trisha Fallon	434	20.7	Australia	Sydney Flames
2000–01	Penny Taylor	536	25.5	Australia	Dandenong Rangers
2001–02	Penny Taylor (2)	570	28.5	Australia	Dandenong Rangers
2002–03	Lauren Jackson (2)	462	27.2	Australia	Canberra Capitals
2003–04	Lauren Jackson (3)	391	27.9	Australia	Canberra Capitals
2004–05	Belinda Snell	427	20.3	Australia	Sydney Uni Flames
2005–06	Deanna Smith	456	21.7	Australia	Perth Lynx
2006–07	Hollie Grima	403	19.2	Australia	Bulleen Melbourne Boomers
2007–08	Natalie Porter	566	24.6	Australia	Sydney Uni Flames
2008–09	Rohanee Cox	466	21.2	Australia	Townsville Fire
2009–10	Suzy Batkovic	491	24.6	Australia	Sydney Uni Flames
2010–11	Liz Cambage	490	22.3	Australia	Bulleen Boomers
2011–12	Suzy Batkovic (2)	439	24.3	Australia	Adelaide Lightning
2012–13	Suzy Batkovic (3)	405	21.3	Australia	Adelaide Lightning
2013–14	Jenna O'Hea	453	20.6	Australia	Dandenong Rangers
2014–15	Abby Bishop	506	23.0	Australia	Canberra Capitals
2015–16	Suzy Batkovic (4)	498	20.8	Australia	Townsville Fire
2016–17	Sami Whitcomb	567	23.6	United States	Perth Lynx
2017–18	Liz Cambage (2)	451	23.7	Australia	Melbourne Boomers
2018–19	Asia Taylor	415	19.7	United States	Perth Lynx
2019–20	Kia Nurse	447	21.3	Canada	Canberra Capitals
2020	Liz Cambage (3)	307	23.6	Australia	Southside Flyers
2021–22	Anneli Maley	316	19.8	Australia	Bendigo Spirit
2022–23	Tiffany Mitchell	364	20.2	United States	Melbourne Boomers

=== Rebounds ===
Year	Player	Rebounds	RPG	Nationality	Team
1987	Samantha Thornton	221	12.3	Australia	Bulleen Melbourne Boomers
1988	Debbie Slimmon	245	12.9	Australia	Coburg Cougars
1989	Rachael Sporn	314	14.3	Australia	West Adelaide Bearcats
1990	Debbie Slimmon (2)	328	13.7	Australia	Bulleen Melbourne Boomers
1991	Debbie Slimmon (3)	279	12.7	Australia	Bulleen Melbourne Boomers
1992	Debbie Slimmon (4)	238	11.9	Australia	Bulleen Melbourne Boomers
1993	Debbie Slimmon (5)	209	13.1	Australia	Bulleen Melbourne Boomers
1994	Debbie Slimmon (6)	243	13.5	Australia	Bulleen Melbourne Boomers
1995	Debbie Slimmon (7)	226	12.6	Australia	Bulleen Melbourne Boomers
1996	Jenny Whittle	189	11.1	Australia	Brisbane Blazers
1997	Rachael Sporn (2)	185	10.3	Australia	Adelaide Lightning
1998	Lucille Hamilton	135	11.3	Australia	Dandenong Rangers
1998–99	Lauren Jackson	238	11.9	Australia	Australian Institute of Sport
1999–00	Kristin Folkl	205	9.8	United States	Melbourne Tigers
2000–01	Lauren Jackson (2)	284	14.2	Australia	Canberra Capitals
2001–02	Suzy Batkovic	256	12.2	Australia	Townsville Fire
2002–03	Lauren Jackson (3)	197	11.6	Australia	Canberra Capitals
2003–04	Lauren Jackson (4)	193	13.8	Australia	Canberra Capitals
2004–05	Donna Loffhagen	120	10.0	New Zealand	Canberra Capitals
2005–06	Hollie Grima	191	9.1	Australia	Bulleen Melbourne Boomers
2006–07	Hollie Grima (2)	233	11.1	Australia	Bulleen Melbourne Boomers
2007–08	Jennifer Crouse	290	12.1	Australia	Townsville Fire
2008–09	Abby Bishop	235	10.7	Australia	Canberra Capitals
2009–10	Liz Cambage	211	9.6	Australia	Bulleen Boomers
2010–11	Cayla Francis	204	9.3	Australia	Logan Thunder
2011–12	Suzy Batkovic (2)	196	10.9	Australia	Adelaide Lightning
2012–13	Suzy Batkovic (3)	186	9.8	Australia	Adelaide Lightning
2013–14	Suzy Batkovic (4)	322	13.4	Australia	Townsville Fire
2014–15	Abby Bishop (2)	233	10.6	Australia	Canberra Capitals
2015–16	Cayla George (2)	290	12.1	Australia	Townsville Fire
2016–17	Mikaela Ruef	265	11.0	United States	Canberra Capitals
2017–18	Liz Cambage (2)	199	10.4	Australia	Melbourne Boomers
2018–19	Kelsey Griffin	243	11.6	Australia	Canberra Capitals
2019–20	Kelsey Griffin (2)	152	10.9	Australia	Canberra Capitals
2020	Anneli Maley	157	12.1	Australia	Sydney Uni Flames
2021–22	Anneli Maley (2)	251	15.7	Australia	Bendigo Spirit
2022–23	Cayla George (3)	238	11.3	Australia	Melbourne Boomers

=== Assists ===
Year	Player	Assists	APG	Nationality	Team
1987	Karin Maar	104	5.2	Australia	Coburg Cougars
1988	Karin Maar (2)	112	5.1	Australia	Coburg Cougars
1989	Karin Maar (3)	134	5.6	Australia	Bulleen Melbourne Boomers
1990	Michelle Landon	175	7.3	Australia	Sydney Bruins
1991	Michelle Landon (2)	158	7.2	Australia	Sydney Bruins
1992	Michelle Landon (3)	158	7.9	Australia	Sydney Flames
1993	Michelle Landon (4)	142	7.9	Australia	Sydney Flames
1994	Michele Timms	94	5.9	Australia	Perth Breakers
1995	Michele Timms (2)	95	5.3	Australia	Sydney Flames
1996	Debbie Black	83	4.9	United States	Hobart Islanders
1997	Robyn Maher	83	4.9	Australia	Sydney Flames
1998	Robyn Maher (2)	62	5.6	Australia	Sydney Flames
1998–99	Kristen Veal	112	6.6	Australia	Australian Institute of Sport
1999–00	Kristen Veal (2); Kristi Harrower	102	4.9	Australia	Canberra Capitals; Melbourne Tigers
2000–01	Annie Burgess	138	6.6	Australia	Sydney Panthers
2001–02	Jae Kingi	100	4.8	Australia	Adelaide Lightning
2002–03	Kristen Veal (3)	113	5.4	Australia	Canberra Capitals
2003–04	Emily McInerny	84	4.0	Australia	Dandenong Rangers
2004–05	Jennifer Screen	123	5.9	Australia	Adelaide Lightning
2005–06	Erin Phillips	102	4.9	Australia	Adelaide Lightning
2006–07	Erin Phillips (2)	84	4.9	Australia	Adelaide Lightning
2007–08	Kathleen MacLeod	127	5.3	Australia	Bendigo Spirit
2008–09	Kristi Harrower	112	5.9	Australia	Bendigo Spirit
2009–10	Kristi Harrower (2)	110	5.0	Australia	Bendigo Spirit
2010–11	Kristen Veal (4)	127	5.8	Australia	Logan Thunder
2011–12	Kathleen MacLeod (2)	162	7.4	Australia	Dandenong Rangers
2012–13	Kristi Harrower (3)	169	6.5	Australia	Bendigo Spirit
2013–14	Kristi Harrower (4)	194	8.1	Australia	Bendigo Spirit
2014–15	Leilani Mitchell	129	5.9	Australia	Sydney Uni Flames
2015–16	Kelly Wilson	132	5.5	Australia	Bendigo Spirit
2016–17	Leilani Mitchell (2)	149	6.2	Australia	Sydney Uni Flames
2017–18	Natalie Hurst	129	6.7	Australia	Canberra Capitals
2018–19	Kelly Wilson (2)	128	6.1	Australia	Canberra Capitals
2019–20	Nicole Seekamp	160	8.0	Australia	Adelaide Lightning
2020	Leilani Mitchell (3)	85	6.5	Australia	Southside Flyers
2021–22	Stephanie Talbot	102	6.4	Australia	Adelaide Lightning
2022–23	Stephanie Reid	110	6.1	Australia	Townsville Fire

=== Steals ===
Year	Player	Steals	SPG	Nationality	Team
1987	Donna Brown	66	3.3	Australia	Noarlunga Tigers
1988	Donna Brown (2)	75	3.6	Australia	North Adelaide Rockets
1989	Kathy Hahn	70	3.2	Australia	Noarlunga Tigers
1990	Michele Timms	68	3.4	Australia	Nunawading Spectres
1991	Michele Timms (2)	79	3.6	Australia	Perth Breakers
1992	Debbie Black	70	3.5	United States	Hobart Islanders
1993	Debbie Black (2)	63	3.5	United States	Hobart Islanders
1994	Robyn Maher	54	3.2	Australia	Sydney Flames
1995	Michele Timms (3)	59	3.3	Australia	Sydney Flames
1996	Debbie Black (3)	86	5.1	United States	Hobart Islanders
1997	Tully Bevilaqua	55	3.1	Australia	Perth Breakers
1998	Tully Bevilaqua (2)	37	4.1	Australia	Perth Breakers
1998–99	Tully Bevilaqua (3)	48	2.4	Australia	Perth Breakers
1999–00	Tully Bevilaqua (4)	60	2.9	Australia	Perth Breakers
2000–01	Penny Taylor	52	2.5	Australia	Dandenong Rangers
2001–02	Melissa McClure	52	2.5	Australia	Perth Lynx
2002–03	Narelle Fletcher	54	2.6	Australia	Dandenong Rangers
2003–04	Katrina Hibbert; Emily McInerny; Gina Stevens	42	2.0	Australia	Bulleen Melbourne Boomers; Dandenong Rangers; Townsville Fire
2004–05	Tully Bevilaqua (5)	40	2.7	Australia	Canberra Capitals
2005–06	Tully Bevilaqua (6)	48	2.3	Australia	Canberra Capitals
2006–07	Emily McInerny (2)	52	2.5	Australia	Dandenong Rangers
2007–08	Tully Bevilaqua (7)	57	2.6	Australia	Canberra Capitals
2008–09	Alicia Poto	52	2.5	Australia	Sydney Uni Flames
2009–10	Kristen Veal	46	2.2	Australia	Logan Thunder
2010–11	Kristen Veal (2)	55	2.5	Australia	Logan Thunder
2011–12	Suzy Batkovic	43	2.4	Australia	Adelaide Lightning
2012–13	Kelsey Griffin	31	1.8	United States	Bendigo Spirit
2013–14	Rebecca Allen	45	1.8	Australia	Melbourne Boomers
2014–15	Rebecca Allen (2)	40	1.8	Australia	Melbourne Boomers
2015–16	Sami Whitcomb	67	2.8	United States	Perth Lynx
2016–17	Sami Whitcomb (2)	67	2.8	United States	Perth Lynx
2017–18	Sami Whitcomb (3)	54	2.5	United States	Perth Lynx
2018–19	Nicole Seekamp	50	2.4	Australia	Adelaide Lightning
2019–20	Olivia Époupa	66	3.0	France	Canberra Capitals
2020	Alison Schwagmeyer	28	2.2	United States	Sydney Uni Flames
2021–22	Kalani Purcell	47	2.8	New Zealand	Sydney Uni Flames
2022–23	Kelsey Griffin (2)	36	2.6	Australia	Bendigo Spirit

=== Blocks ===
Year	Player	Blocks	BPG	Nationality	Team
1987	Chris Saunders	24	1.2	Australia	Bulleen Melbourne Boomers
1988	Roksana Boreli	13	2.2	Yugoslavia	Hobart Islanders
1989	Sarah Duncan	30	2.0	Australia	Coburg Cougars
1990	Sarah Sullivan (2)	50	2.5	Australia	Coburg Cougars
1991	Jenny Whittle	57	2.6	Australia	Australian Institute of Sport
1992	Renae Fegent	51	2.7	Australia	Canberra Capitals
1993	Diana Sadovnikova	36	2.6	Ukraine	Canberra Capitals
1994	Jenny Whittle (2)	49	2.9	Australia	Brisbane Blazers
1995	Jenny Whittle (3)	50	2.8	Australia	Brisbane Blazers
1996	Jenny Whittle (4)	70	4.1	Australia	Brisbane Blazers
1997	Jenny Whittle (5)	52	2.9	Australia	Brisbane Blazers
1998	Jenny Whittle (6)	40	3.3	Australia	Perth Breakers
1998–99	Jenny Whittle (7)	53	2.5	Australia	Perth Breakers
1999–00	Kristin Folkl	40	1.9	United States	Melbourne Tigers
2000–01	Lauren Jackson	86	4.3	Australia	Canberra Capitals
2001–02	Lauren Jackson (2)	44	3.4	Australia	Canberra Capitals
2002–03	Jennifer Crouse	88	4.2	Australia	Perth Lynx
2003–04	Lauren Jackson (3)	34	2.4	Australia	Canberra Capitals
2004–05	Jenny Whittle (8)	48	2.3	Australia	Canberra Capitals
2005–06	Louella Tomlinson	51	2.7	Australia	Australian Institute of Sport
2006–07	Tracey Beatty	59	2.8	Australia	Canberra Capitals
2007–08	Jennifer Crouse (2)	55	2.3	Australia	Townsville Fire
2008–09	Jennifer Crouse (3)	55	2.5	Australia	Townsville Fire
2009–10	Marianna Tolo	66	3.0	Australia	Canberra Capitals
2010–11	Liz Cambage	62	2.8	Australia	Bulleen Boomers
2011–12	Marianna Tolo (2)	68	3.1	Australia	Canberra Capitals
2012–13	Suzy Batkovic	50	2.6	Australia	Adelaide Lightning
2013–14	Suzy Batkovic (2)	46	1.9	Australia	Townsville Fire
2014–15	Louella Tomlinson (2)	41	2.6	Australia	West Coast Waves
2015–16	Louella Tomlinson (3)	42	2.0	Australia	Perth Lynx
2016–17	Jennifer Hamson	57	2.6	United States	Sydney Uni Flames
2017–18	Jennifer Hamson (2)	56	2.6	United States	Sydney Uni Flames
2018–19	Nia Coffey	38	1.8	United States	Adelaide Lightning
2019–20	Brianna Turner	46	2.2	United States	Adelaide Lightning
2020	Liz Cambage (2)	24	1.9	Australia	Southside Flyers
2021–22	Ezi Magbegor	22	1.6	Australia	Melbourne Boomers
2022–23	Olivia Nelson-Ododa	30	1.5	United States	Melbourne Boomers
