= List of WNBL seasons =

Season	Teams	Champion	Season MVP	Coach of the Year	Breakout Player of the Year	Leading Scorer	Defensive Player of the Year	Grand Final MVP
1981	9	St Kilda Saints	N/A	N/A	N/A	Julie Nykiel; Noarlunga Tigers	N/A	N/A
1982	10	St Kilda Saints (2)	Karen Ogden; St Kilda Saints	N/A	N/A	Karen Ogden; St Kilda Saints	N/A	N/A
1983	10	Nunawading Spectres	Karen Ogden (2); St Kilda Saints; Robyn Maher; Nunawading Spectres	N/A	N/A	Julie Nykiel (2); Noarlunga Tigers	N/A	N/A
1984	11	Nunawading Spectres (2)	Julie Nykiel; Noarlunga Tigers	N/A	N/A	Julie Nykiel (3); Noarlunga Tigers	N/A	N/A
1985	11	Coburg Cougars	Kathy Foster; North Adelaide Rockets	N/A	N/A	Julie Nykiel (4); Noarlunga Tigers	N/A	Karin Maar; Coburg Cougars
1986	13	Nunawading Spectres (3)	Kathy Foster (2); Hobart Islanders	N/A	N/A	Karin Maar; Coburg Cougars	N/A	Shelley Gorman; Nunawading Spectres
1987	11	Nunawading Spectres (4)	Robyn Maher (2); Nunawading Spectres	Tom Maher; Nunawading Spectres	N/A	Kathy Foster; Hobart Islanders	N/A	Tracey Browning; Nunawading Spectres
1988	12	Nunawading Spectres (5)	Julie Nykiel (2); Noarlunga Tigers	Robbie Cadee; Bankstown Bruins	Lucille Hamilton; AIS	Julie Nykiel (5); Noarlunga Tigers	N/A	Shelley Gorman (2); Nunawading Spectres
1989	12	Nunawading Spectres (6)	Kathy Foster (3); Hobart Islanders	Mark Molitor; North Adelaide Rockets	Renae Fegent; AIS	Kathy Foster (2); Hobart Islanders	N/A	Robyn Maher; Nunawading Spectres
1990	13	North Adelaide Rockets	Debbie Slimmon; Bulleen Boomers	Jenny Cheesman; AIS	Trisha Fallon; AIS	Debbie Slimmon; Bulleen Boomers	Karen Dalton; Sydney Bruins	Donna Brown; North Adelaide Rockets
1991	12	Hobart Islanders	Joanne Metcalfe; Melbourne Tigers	Jerry Lee; Canberra Capitals	Michelle Brogan; Noarlunga Tigers	Joanne Metcalfe; Melbourne Tigers	Kim Foley; Hobart Islanders	Debbie Black; Hobart Islanders
1992	11	Perth Breakers	Debbie Slimmon (2); Bulleen Boomers	Tom Maher (2); Perth Breakers	Allison Cook; Melbourne Tigers	Jodie Murphy; Canberra Capitals	Robyn Maher; Perth Breakers	Tanya Fisher; Perth Breakers
1993	10	Sydney Flames	Alison Cook; Melbourne Tigers	Jan Stirling; Adelaide Lightning	Allison Cook (2); Melbourne Tigers	Samantha Thornton; Dandenong Rangers	Karen Dalton (2); Sydney Flames	Annie Burgess; Sydney Flames
1994	10	Adelaide Lightning	Shelley Gorman; Sydney Flames	Ray Tomlinson; Melbourne Tigers	Maryanne Difrancesco; Melbourne Tigers	Sandy Brondello; Brisbane Blazers; Shelley Gorman; Sydney Flames	Robyn Maher (2); Sydney Flames	Rachael Sporn; Adelaide Lightning
1995	10	Adelaide Lightning (2)	Sandy Brondello; Brisbane Blazers	Guy Molloy; Perth Breakers	Chika Emeagi; AIS	Sandy Brondello (2); Brisbane Blazers	Tully Bevilaqua; Perth Breakers	Rachael Sporn (2); Adelaide Lightning
1996	10	Adelaide Lightning (3)	Rachael Sporn; Adelaide Lightning	Lori Chizik; Bulleen Boomers	Jessica Bibby; Dandenong Rangers	Gina Stevens; Perth Breakers	Tully Bevilaqua (2); Perth Breakers	Michelle Griffiths; Adelaide Lightning
1997	9	Sydney Flames (2)	Rachael Sporn (2); Adelaide Lightning	Bill Tomlinson; Sydney Flames	Lauren Jackson; AIS	Rachael Sporn; Adelaide Lightning	Tully Bevilaqua (3); Perth Breakers	Trisha Fallon; Sydney Flames
1998	9	Adelaide Lightning (4)	Michelle Griffiths; Sydney Flames	Phil Brown; AIS	Andrea Cartledge; Melbourne Tigers	Alison Cook; Bulleen Boomers	Emily McInerny; Melbourne Tigers	Jo Hill; Adelaide Lightning
1998–99	8	Australian Institute of Sport	Lauren Jackson; AIS	Phil Brown (2); AIS	Caitlin Ryan; Dandenong Rangers	Lauren Jackson; AIS	Emily McInerny (2); Melbourne Tigers	Kristen Veal; AIS
1999–00	8	Canberra Capitals	Lauren Jackson (2); Canberra Capitals; Trisha Fallon; Sydney Flames	Mark Wright; Dandenong Rangers	Shelley Hammonds; AIS	Trisha Fallon; Sydney Flames	Tully Bevilaqua (4); Perth Breakers	Kristen Veal (2); Canberra Capitals
2000–01	8	Sydney Panthers (2)	Penny Taylor; Dandenong Rangers	Mark Wright (2); Dandenong Rangers	Laura Summerton; AIS	Penny Taylor; Dandenong Rangers	Emily McInerny (3); Dandenong Rangers	Annie Burgess (2); Sydney Panthers
2001–02	8	Canberra Capitals (2)	Penny Taylor (2); Dandenong Rangers	Karen Dalton; Sydney Panthers	Alison Downie; Dandenong Rangers; Kamala Lamshed; Adelaide Lightning	Penny Taylor (2); Dandenong Rangers	Emily McInerny (4); Dandenong Rangers	Lauren Jackson; Canberra Capitals
2002–03	8	Canberra Capitals (3)	Lauren Jackson (3); Canberra Capitals	David Herbert; Townsville Fire	Kelly Wilson; AIS	Lauren Jackson (2); Canberra Capitals	Natalie Porter; Townsville Fire	Lauren Jackson (2); Canberra Capitals
2003–04	8	Dandenong Rangers	Lauren Jackson (4); Canberra Capitals	Gary Fox; Dandenong Rangers	Kathleen MacLeod; AIS	Lauren Jackson (3); Canberra Capitals	Emily McInerny (5); Dandenong Rangers	Emily McInerny; Dandenong Rangers
2004–05	8	Dandenong Rangers (2)	Katrina Hibbert; Bulleen Boomers	Cheryl Chambers; Bulleen Boomers	Renae Camino; AIS	Belinda Snell; Sydney Uni Flames	Emily McInerny (6); Dandenong Rangers	Jacinta Hamilton; Dandenong Rangers
2005–06	8	Canberra Capitals (4)	Katrina Hibbert (2); Bulleen Boomers	Gary Fox (2); Dandenong Rangers	Abby Bishop; AIS	Deanna Smith; Perth Lynx	Emily McInerny (7); Dandenong Rangers	Lauren Jackson (3); Canberra Capitals
2006–07	8	Canberra Capitals (5)	Hollie Grima; Bulleen Boomers	Carrie Graf; Canberra Capitals	Cayla Francis; AIS	Hollie Grima; Bulleen Boomers	Emily McInerny (8); Dandenong Rangers	Tracey Beatty; Canberra Capitals
2007–08	10	Adelaide Lightning (5)	Natalie Porter; Sydney Uni Flames	Carrie Graf (2); Canberra Capitals	Nicole Hunt; AIS	Natalie Porter; Sydney Uni Flames	Emily McInerny (9); Dandenong Rangers	Renae Camino; Adelaide Lightning
2008–09	10	Canberra Capitals (6)	Rohanee Cox; Townsville Fire	Cheryl Chambers (2); Bulleen Boomers	Sarah Graham; Logan Thunder	Rohanee Cox; Townsville Fire	Alicia Poto; Sydney Uni Flames	Natalie Hurst; Canberra Capitals
2009–10	10	Canberra Capitals (7)	Kristi Harrower; Bendigo Spirit	Tom Maher (3); Bulleen Boomers	Tayla Roberts; AIS	Suzy Batkovic; Sydney Uni Flames	Rachael Flanagan; Townsville Fire	Lauren Jackson (4); Canberra Capitals
2010–11	10	Bulleen Boomers	Liz Cambage; Bulleen Boomers	Tom Maher (4); Bulleen Boomers	Gretel Tippett; Logan Thunder	Liz Cambage; Bulleen Boomers	Rachael Flanagan (2); Townsville Fire	Sharin Milner; Bulleen Boomers
2011–12	10	Dandenong Rangers (3)	Suzy Batkovic; Adelaide Lightning	Peter Buckle; Adelaide Lightning	Carley Mijovic; AIS	Suzy Batkovic (2); Adelaide Lightning	Alicia Poto (2); Sydney Uni Flames	Kathleen MacLeod; Dandenong Rangers
2012–13	9	Bendigo Spirit	Suzy Batkovic (2); Adelaide Lightning	Bernie Harrower; Bendigo Spirit	Stephanie Talbot; Adelaide Lightning	Suzy Batkovic (3); Adelaide Lightning	Kristi Harrower; Bendigo Spirit	Kelsey Griffin; Bendigo Spirit
2013–14	9	Bendigo Spirit (2)	Suzy Batkovic (3); Townsville Fire	Guy Molloy; Melbourne Boomers	Alex Wilson; Townsville Fire	Jenna O'Hea; Dandenong Rangers	Rebecca Allen; Melbourne Boomers	Kelsey Griffin (2); Bendigo Spirit
2014–15	8	Townsville Fire	Abby Bishop; Canberra Capitals	Shannon Seebohm; Sydney Uni Flames	Lauren Scherf; Dandenong Rangers	Abby Bishop; Canberra Capitals	Kelsey Griffin; Bendigo Spirit	Mia Newley; Townsville Fire
2015–16	9	Townsville Fire (2)	Suzy Batkovic (4); Townsville Fire	Andy Stewart; Perth Lynx	Alex Ciabattoni; Adelaide Lightning	Suzy Batkovic (4); Townsville Fire	Stephanie Cumming; Dandenong Rangers	Micaela Cocks; Townsville Fire
2016–17	8	Sydney Uni Flames (4)	Suzy Batkovic (5); Townsville Fire	Cheryl Chambers (3); Sydney Uni Flames	Monique Conti; Melbourne Boomers	Sami Whitcomb; Perth Lynx	Marianna Tolo; Canberra Capitals	Leilani Mitchell; Sydney Uni Flames
2017–18	8	Townsville Fire (3)	Suzy Batkovic (6); Townsville Fire	Andy Stewart (2); Perth Lynx	Ezi Magbegor; Canberra Capitals	Liz Cambage (2); Melbourne Boomers	Kayla Pedersen; Dandenong Rangers	Suzy Batkovic; Townsville Fire
2018–19	8	Canberra Capitals (8)	Kelsey Griffin; Canberra Capitals	Chris Lucas; Adelaide Lightning	Jazmin Shelley; Melbourne Boomers	Asia Taylor; Perth Lynx	Lauren Nicholson; Adelaide Lightning	Kelsey Griffin (3); Canberra Capitals
2019–20	8	Canberra Capitals (9)	Kia Nurse; Canberra Capitals	Paul Goriss; Canberra Capitals	Ezi Magbegor (2); Melbourne Boomers	Kia Nurse; Canberra Capitals	Mercedes Russell; Southside Flyers	Olivia Époupa; Canberra Capitals
2020	8	Southside Flyers (4)	Stephanie Talbot; Adelaide Lightning	Shannon Seebohm (2); Townsville Fire	Shyla Heal; Townsville Fire	Liz Cambage (3); Southside Flyers	Stephanie Talbot; Adelaide Lightning	Leilani Mitchell (2); Southside Flyers
2021–22	8	Melbourne Boomers (2)	Anneli Maley; Bendigo Spirit	Ryan Petrik; Perth Lynx	Ezi Magbegor (3); Melbourne Boomers	Anneli Maley; Bendigo Spirit	Brittney Sykes; Canberra Capitals	Lindsay Allen; Melbourne Boomers
2022–23	8		Cayla George; Melbourne Boomers	Shannon Seebohm (3); Townsville Fire	Isobel Borlase; Adelaide Lightning	Tiffany Mitchell; Melbourne Boomers	Stephanie Talbot (2); Adelaide Lightning	

== See also ==
- List of National Basketball League (Australia) seasons
