= Antonia Farnworth =

New Zealand basketball player (born 1987)

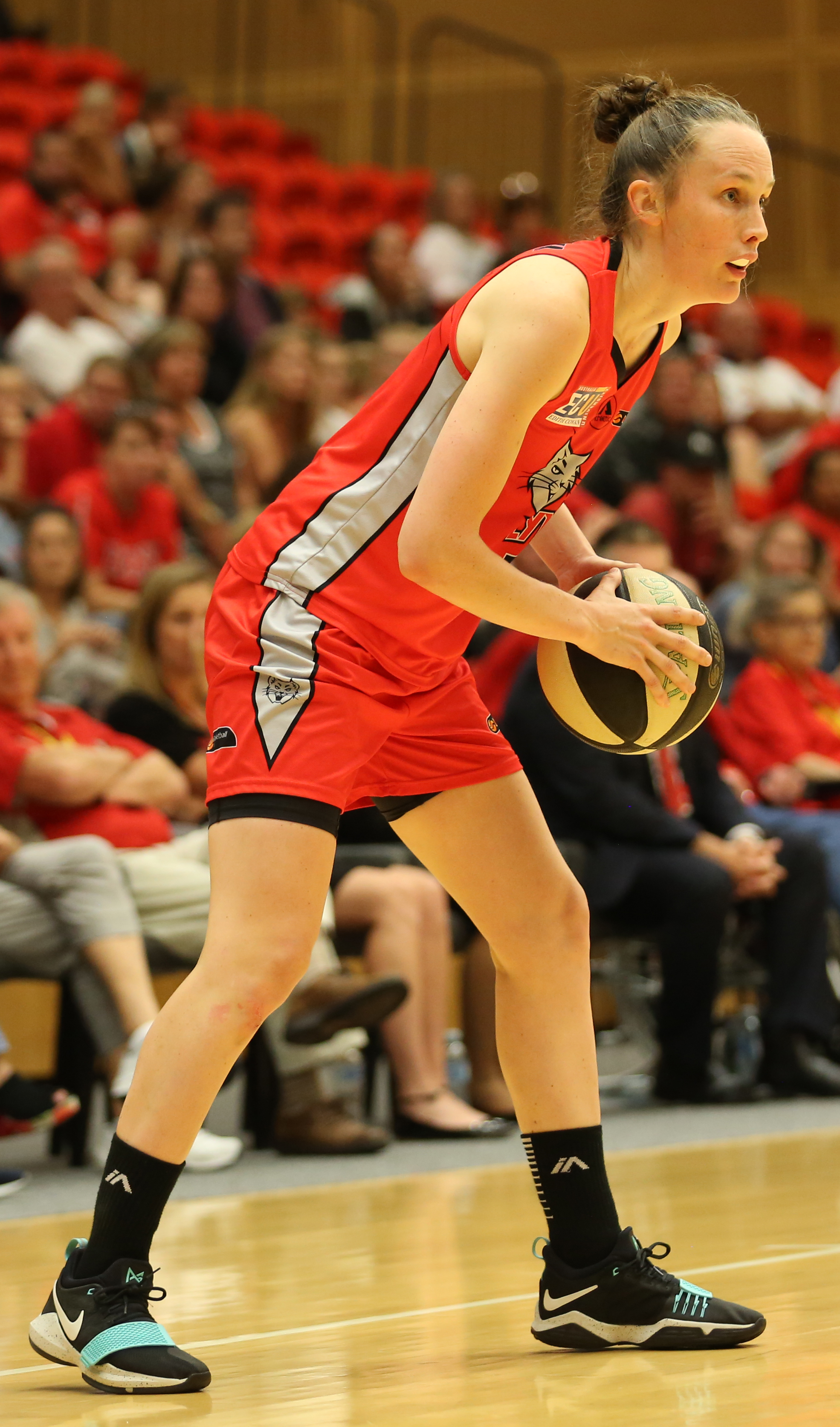
- Farnworth in January 2018

Personal information
- Born: 10 May 1987 (age 39) Christchurch, New Zealand
- Listed height: 181 cm (5 ft 11 in)

Career information
- High school: Christchurch Girls' (Christchurch, New Zealand)
- Playing career: 2007–2021
- Position: Guard

Career history
- 2007–2008: Christchurch Sirens
- 2009–2010: Albury Wodonga Bandits
- 2009–2010: Dandenong Rangers
- 2010–2011: Bendigo Spirit
- 2011: Bendigo Braves
- 2011–2012: Adelaide Lightning
- 2012: Hume City Broncos
- 2012–2015: West Coast Waves
- 2013–2014: Willetton Tigers
- 2015: Joondalup Wolves
- 2015–2019: Perth Lynx
- 2016–2018: Perry Lakes Hawks
- 2019: Ringwood Hawks
- 2019–2020: Melbourne Boomers
- 2021: Ringwood Hawks

Career highlights
- SBL champion (2017); SBL Grand Final MVP (2017); SBL All-Star Five (2018); SBL All-Defensive Five (2018)
Medals
Representing New Zealand
Women's basketball
Commonwealth Games
Bronze medal – third place	2018 Gold Coast	Team competition
FIBA Oceania Championships
Silver medal – second place	2007 New Zealand	Team
Silver medal – second place	2009 Australia / New Zealand	Team
Silver medal – second place	2011 Australia	Team
Silver medal – second place	2013 Australia / New Zealand	Team

Antonia "Toni" Farnworth (née Edmondson) (born 10 May 1987) is a New Zealand former professional basketball player. She spent most of her career playing in the Women's National Basketball League (WNBL) in Australia and was a representative and captain of the New Zealand national team, the Tall Ferns.

== Early life ==
Farnworth was born in Christchurch, New Zealand.

== Professional career ==
=== Early years (2007–2012) ===
Farnworth began her professional career in 2007 when she joined her hometown team, the Christchurch Sirens, of the Women's National Basketball League (WNBL). She played one season for the Sirens before the club folded prior to the start of the 2008–09 season.

In 2009, Farnworth moved to Australia and joined the Albury Wodonga Bandits of the South East Australian Basketball League (SEABL). In 21 games for the Bandits in 2009, she averaged 15.1 points and 7.3 rebounds per game.

Farnworth returned to the WNBL for the 2009–10 season, joining the Dandenong Rangers. In 22 games for the club, she averaged 5.0 points and 2.2 rebounds per game.

After spending the 2010 SEABL season with Albury Wodonga, Farnworth joined the Bendigo Spirit for the 2010–11 WNBL season. In 24 games for the club, she averaged 4.3 points and 2.8 rebounds per game. Following the 2010–11 WNBL season, Farnworth joined the Bendigo Braves for the 2011 SEABL season.

In July 2011, Farnworth signed with the Adelaide Lightning for the 2011–12 WNBL season. In 24 games for the club, she averaged 4.2 points and 2.4 rebounds per game. Following the 2011–12 WNBL season, she joined the Hume City Broncos for the 2012 Big V season. In 12 games for Hume City, she averaged 20.9 points, 8.5 rebounds, 3.1 assists and 1.4 blocks per game.

=== West Coast Waves (2012–2015) ===
In August 2012, Farnworth signed with the West Coast Waves for the 2012–13 WNBL season. Edmondson found her place with the Waves in Perth while playing under her long-time coach and mentor Kennedy Kereama. However, success eluded the Waves over her three seasons with the club as they finished on the bottom of the ladder every year, winning just nine total games over that span. Her best season with the Waves came in 2013–14 when she recorded averages of 13.2 points, 4.1 rebounds and 2.4 assist per game, all career highs. During her time with the Waves, she played in the State Basketball League (SBL) during the off-seasons, competing with the Willetton Tigers (2013 & 2014) and Joondalup Wolves (2015).

=== Perth Lynx (2015–2019) ===
On 2 September 2015, Farnworth signed with the Perth Lynx for the 2015–16 WNBL season, joining the rebranded club after the Perth Wildcats purchased the West Coast Waves. She helped the Lynx reach their first WNBL Grand Final since 1999, where they lost the best-of-three series 2–0 to the Townsville Fire. She appeared in all 27 games for the Lynx in 2015–16, averaging 3.7 points, 2.1 rebounds and 1.4 assists per game.

For the 2016 SBL season, Farnworth joined the Perry Lakes Hawks.

On 3 May 2016, Farnworth re-signed with the Perth Lynx for the 2016–17 WNBL season. She started all 27 games for the Lynx in 2016–17, averaging 8.8 points, 3.6 rebounds and 2.4 assists per game.

In March 2017, Farnworth re-joined the Perry Lakes Hawks. Farnworth was a powerful force for the Hawks in 2017, helping them win the minor premiership with a 20–2 record before reaching the SBL Grand Final. Farnworth took out the Grand Final MVP award after her dominant performance in leading the Hawks to championship victory over the Mandurah Magic, particularly in the second half where she had 18 of her 26 points. She shot 8-of-18 from the field, 3-of-7 from downtown and 7-of-8 at the foul line.

On 11 April 2017, Farnworth re-signed with the Perth Lynx for the 2017–18 WNBL season. On 28 September 2017, just a week out from the start of the WNBL season, Farnworth was ruled out for up to 12 weeks with a broken wrist she suffered during pre-season play. On 25 November 2017, she was cleared to return three weeks ahead of the initial time frame. The Lynx finished on top of the ladder thanks to a 14-game winning streak, but a brutal travel schedule and string of injuries robbed them of the chance to taste ultimate success.

She re-joined the Hawks in 2018, before re-signing with the Lynx on 14 June 2018.

=== Melbourne Boomers and Ringwood Hawks (2019–2021) ===
For the 2019–20 WNBL season and the 2020 WNBL Hub season in Queensland, Farnworth played for the Melbourne Boomers. She retired from the WNBL in August 2021.

In 2019 and 2021, Farnworth played in the NBL1 South for the Ringwood Hawks.

== National team career ==
Farnworth made her debut for the New Zealand Tall Ferns during the 2007 FIBA Oceania Championship. At the 2013 FIBA Oceania Championship, Farnworth averaged a tournament-leading 22 points per game. She represented the Tall Ferns at the 2017 FIBA Women's Asia Cup, averaging 7.7 points and 6.2 rebounds. Farnworth was selected in the New Zealand team for the 2018 Commonwealth Games. She retired from the Tall Ferns in August 2021 after amassing more than 100 games for New Zealand – one of just nine players to have achieved such a figure.

== Personal life ==
In April 2017, she married Josh Farnworth.
