= 2009–10 WNBL season =

- League: Women's National Basketball League
- Sport: Basketball
- Duration: 2 October 2009 – 6 March 2010
- Number of teams: 10
- TV partner(s): ABC

Regular season
- Top seed: Bulleen Boomers
- Season MVP: Kristi Harrower Bendigo
- Top scorer: Suzy Batkovic Sydney

Finals
- Champions: Canberra Capitals
- Runners-up: Bulleen Boomers
- Finals MVP: Lauren Jackson Canberra

WNBL seasons
- ← 2008–09 2010–11 →

The 2009–10 WNBL season was the 30th season of competition since its establishment in 1981. A total of 10 teams contested the league. The regular season was played between October 2009 and March 2010, followed by a post-season involving the top five in March 2010. The Canberra Capitals were the defending champions and they successfully defended their title with a 75–70 win over the Bulleen Boomers in the Grand Final.

Broadcast rights were held by free-to-air network ABC. ABC broadcast one game a week, at 1:00PM at every standard time in Australia. Molten provided equipment including the official game ball, with Hoop2Hoop supplying team apparel.

== Team standings ==
#	WNBL Championship Ladder				
#	Team	W	L	PCT	GP
1	Bulleen Boomers	21	1	95.5	22
2	Sydney Uni Flames	17	5	77.3	22
3	Canberra Capitals	16	6	72.7	22
4	Townsville Fire	14	8	63.6	22
5	Bendigo Spirit	13	9	59.1	22
6	Adelaide Lightning	13	9	59.1	22
7	Dandenong Rangers	7	15	31.8	22
8	Logan Thunder	6	16	27.3	22
9	Perth Lynx	2	20	9.1	22
10	Australian Institute of Sport	1	21	4.5	22

== Finals ==
Elimination final
4	Townsville Fire	84
5	Bendigo Spirit	73

Semifinals
1	Bulleen Boomers	72
Sydney Uni Flames	55
Canberra Capitals	70
Townsville Fire	39

Preliminary final
Sydney Uni Flames	56
Canberra Capitals	61

Grand final
Bulleen Boomers	70
Canberra Capitals	75

== Season award winners ==
Award	Winner	Position	Team
Most Valuable Player Award	Kristi Harrower	Guard	Bendigo Spirit
Grand Final MVP Award	Lauren Jackson	Centre	Canberra Capitals
Rookie of the Year Award	Tayla Roberts	Forward	AIS
Defensive Player of the Year Award	Rachael Flanagan	Guard	Townsville Fire
Coach of the Year Award	Tom Maher	Coach	Bulleen Boomers
Top Shooter Award	Suzy Batkovic	Forward/Centre	Sydney Uni Flames
All-Star Five	Liz Cambage; Suzy Batkovic; Deanna Smith; Jenna O'Hea; Kristi Harrower	Centre; Forward/Centre; Forward; Guard/Forward; Guard	Bulleen Boomers; Sydney Uni Flames; Sydney Uni Flames; Bulleen Boomers; Bendigo Spirit

== Statistics leaders ==
Category	Player	Team	GP	Totals	Average
Points Per Game	Suzy Batkovic	Sydney Uni Flames	20	491	24.6
Rebounds Per Game	Liz Cambage	Bulleen Boomers	22	211	9.6
Assists Per Game	Kristi Harrower	Bendigo Spirit	22	110	5.0
Steals Per Game	Kristen Veal	Logan Thunder	21	46	2.2
Blocks per game	Marianna Tolo	Canberra Capitals	22	66	3.0
Field Goal %	Liz Cambage	Bulleen Boomers	22	(169/286)	59.1%
Three-Point Field Goal %	Sarah Graham	Logan Thunder	18	(29/71)	40.8%
Free Throw %	Rohanee Cox	Townsville Fire	11	(60/69)	87.0%
