= 2011–12 WNBL season =

- League: Women's National Basketball League
- Sport: Basketball
- Duration: 7 October 2011 – 11 March 2012
- Teams: 10
- TV partner: ABC

Regular season
- Top seed: Adelaide Lightning
- Season MVP: (Australia) Suzy Batkovic Adelaide
- Top scorer: (Australia) Suzy Batkovic Adelaide

Finals
- Champions: Dandenong Rangers
- Runners-up: Bulleen Boomers
- Finals MVP: (Australia) Kathleen MacLeod Dandenong

WNBL seasons
- ← 2010–11 2012–13 →

The 2011–12 WNBL season was the 32nd season of competition since its establishment in 1981. A total of 10 teams contested the league. The regular season was played between October 2011 and March 2012, followed by a post-season involving the top five in March 2012. The Bulleen Boomers attempted to defend their title, but fell short at the last phase, losing in the finals to the Dandenong Rangers.

Broadcast rights were held by free-to-air network ABC. ABC broadcast one game a week, at 1:00PM at every standard time in Australia.

Sponsorship included iiNet, entering its second year as league naming rights sponsor. Spalding provided equipment including the official game ball, with Champion supplying team apparel.

== Team standings ==
#	WNBL Championship Ladder				
#	Team	W	L	PCT	GP
1	Adelaide Lightning	18	4	81.8	22
2	Bulleen Boomers	15	7	68.2	22
3	Dandenong Rangers	14	8	63.4	22
4	Townsville Fire	13	9	59.0	22
5	Sydney Uni Flames	13	9	59.0	22
6	Bendigo Spirit	12	10	54.5	22
7	Logan Thunder	12	10	54.5	22
8	Canberra Capitals	9	13	40.9	22
9	West Coast Waves	2	20	9.0	22
10	AIS	2	20	9.0	22

== Finals ==
Elimination Final
4	Townsville Fire	85
5	Sydney Uni Flames	78

Semifinals
1	Adelaide Lightning	70
2	Bulleen Boomers	73
3	Dandenong Rangers	77
4	Townsville Fire	66

Preliminary final
Adelaide Lightning	78
Dandenong Rangers	91

Grand final
Bulleen Boomers	70
Dandenong Rangers	94

== Season award winners ==
Award	Winner	Position	Team
Most Valuable Player Award	(Australia) Suzy Batkovic	Forward/Centre	Adelaide Lightning
Grand Final MVP Award	(Australia) Kathleen MacLeod	Guard	Dandenong Rangers
Rookie of the Year Award	(Australia) Carley Mijovic	Forward	AIS
Defensive Player of the Year Award	(Australia) Alicia Poto	Guard	Sydney Uni Flames
Coach of the Year Award	(Australia) Peter Buckle	Coach	Adelaide Lightning
Top Shooter Award	(Australia) Suzy Batkovic	Forward/Centre	Adelaide Lightning
All-Star Five	(Australia) Suzy Batkovic (United States) Shanavia Dowdell (Australia) Belinda Snell (Australia) Jenna O'Hea (Australia) Kathleen MacLeod (Australia) Samantha Richards	Forward/Centre; Forward; Guard/Forward; Guard/Forward; Guard; Guard	Adelaide Lightning; Townsville Fire; Sydney Uni Flames; Dandenong Rangers; Dandenong Rangers; Bulleen Boomers

== Statistics leaders ==
Category	Player	Team	GP	Totals	Average
Points Per Game	(Australia) Suzy Batkovic	Adelaide Lightning	18	438	24.3
Rebounds Per Game	(Australia) Suzy Batkovic	Adelaide Lightning	18	196	10.9
Assists Per Game	(Australia) Kathleen MacLeod	Dandenong Rangers	22	162	7.4
Steals Per Game	(Australia) Suzy Batkovic	Adelaide Lightning	18	43	2.4
Blocks per game	(Australia) Marianna Tolo	Canberra Capitals	22	68	3.1
Field Goal %	(Australia) Elizabeth Cambage	Bulleen Boomers	22	(181/305)	59.4%
Three-Point Field Goal %	(Australia) Sarah Graham	Logan Thunder	22	(40/91)	44.0%
Free Throw %	(Australia) Carly Wilson	Canberra Capitals	22	(47/50)	94.0%

Source: 2014–15 WNBL Media Guide
