= Natasha Bargeus =

Australian basketball player

Personal information
- Born: 8 June 1971 (age 55) Port Hedland, Western Australia, Australia

Natasha Jane Bargeus (born 8 June 1971) is an Australian former basketball player born in Port Hedland, Western Australia.

She played a total of 177 games from 1988 to 1998 for the Perth Breakers in the Women's National Basketball League.

She was part of the Australian team which won bronze at the 1989 FIBA Under-19 World Championship for Women in Bilbao, Spain.

On 13 September 2000, she was awarded the Australian Sports Medal for basketballing achievements. In September 2013, she was named in the 25 Year State Basketball League (SBL) All Star team.
