= 2006–07 WNBL season =

- League: Women's National Basketball League
- Sport: Basketball
- Duration: October 2006 – February 2007
- Number of teams: 8
- TV partner(s): ABC

Regular season
- Top seed: Sydney Uni Flames
- Season MVP: Hollie Grima (Bulleen Boomers)
- Top scorer: Hollie Grima (Bulleen Boomers)

Finals
- Champions: Canberra Capitals
- Runners-up: Sydney Uni Flames
- Finals MVP: Tracey Beatty (Canberra Capitals)

WNBL seasons
- ← 2005–06 2007–08 →

The 2006–07 WNBL season was the 27th season of competition since its establishment in 1981. A total of 8 teams contested the league. The regular season was played between October 2006 and March 2007, followed by a post-season involving the top five in March 2007.

Broadcast rights were held by free-to-air network ABC. ABC broadcast one game a week, at 1:00PM at every standard time in Australia.

Molten provided equipment including the official game ball, with Hoop2Hoop supplying team apparel.

== Team standings ==
#	WNBL Championship Ladder				
#	Team	W	L	PCT	GP
1	Sydney Uni Flames	16	5	76.2	21
2	Canberra Capitals	15	6	71.4	21
3	Adelaide Lightning	15	6	71.4	21
4	Dandenong Rangers	12	9	57.1	21
5	Bulleen Boomers	12	9	57.1	21
6	Townsville Fire	10	11	47.6	21
7	Perth Lynx	3	18	14.3	21
8	AIS	1	20	4.8	21

== Finals ==
Semifinals
Sydney Uni Flames	74
Canberra Capitals	65
Adelaide Lightning	66
Dandenong Rangers	61

Preliminary final
Canberra Capitals	82
Adelaide Lightning	74

Grand final
Sydney Uni Flames	59
Canberra Capitals	73

== Season award winners ==
Award	Winner	Team
Most Valuable Player Award	Hollie Grima	Bulleen Boomers
Grand Final MVP Award	Tracey Beatty	Canberra Capitals
Rookie of the Year Award	Cayla Francis	AIS
Defensive Player of the Year Award	Emily McInerny	Dandenong Rangers
Coach of the Year Award	Carrie Graf	Canberra Capitals
Top Shooter Award	Hollie Grima	Bulleen Boomers

== Statistics leaders ==
Category	Player	Team	GP	Totals	Average
Points Per Game	Hollie Grima	Bulleen Boomers	21	403	19.2
Rebounds Per Game	Hollie Grima	Bulleen Boomers	21	233	11.1
Assists Per Game	Erin Phillips	Adelaide Lightning	17	84	4.9
Steals Per Game	Emily McInerny	Dandenong Rangers	21	52	2.5
Blocks per game	Tracey Beatty	Canberra Capitals	21	59	2.8
Field Goal %	Jennifer Crouse	Townsville Fire	21	(90/152)	59.2%
Three-Point Field Goal %	Kathleen MacLeod	Dandenong Rangers	11	(14/33)	42.4%
Free Throw %	Kathleen MacLeod	Dandenong Rangers	11	(44/49)	89.8%
