= 2010–11 WNBL season =

- League: Women's National Basketball League
- Sport: Basketball
- Duration: 9 October 2010 – 13 March 2011
- Teams: 10
- TV partner: ABC

Regular season
- Top seed: Bulleen Boomers
- Season MVP: Liz Cambage Bulleen
- Top scorer: Liz Cambage Bulleen

Finals
- Champions: Bulleen Boomers
- Runners-up: Canberra Capitals
- Finals MVP: Sharin Milner Bulleen

WNBL seasons
- ← 2009–10 2011–12 →

The 2010–11 WNBL season was the 31st season of competition since its establishment in 1981. A total of 10 teams contested the league. The regular season was played between 9 October 2010 and 13 March 2011, followed by a post-season involving the top five in March 2011. The Canberra Capitals were the two-time defending champions, but were defeated in the Grand Final by the Bulleen Boomers.

Broadcast rights were held by free-to-air network ABC. ABC broadcast one game a week, at 1:00PM at every standard time in Australia. Sponsorship included iiNet, entering its first year as league naming rights sponsor. Spalding provided equipment, including the official game ball, with Champion supplying team apparel.

== Team standings ==
#	WNBL championship ladder				
#	Team	W	L	PCT	GP
1	Bulleen Boomers	19	3	86.4	22
2	Canberra Capitals	18	4	81.8	22
3	Bendigo Spirit	15	7	68.2	22
4	Dandenong Rangers	12	10	54.5	22
5	Logan Thunder	12	10	54.5	22
6	Sydney Uni Flames	10	12	45.5	22
7	Townsville Fire	10	12	45.5	22
8	West Coast Waves	8	14	36.4	22
9	Adelaide Lightning	3	19	13.6	22
10	AIS	3	19	13.6	22

== Finals ==
Elimination final
4	Dandenong Rangers	73
5	Logan Thunder	83

Semifinals
1	Bulleen Boomers	71
2	Canberra Capitals	67
3	Bendigo Spirit	74
5	Logan Thunder	53

Preliminary final
Canberra Capitals	83
Bendigo Spirit	78

Grand final
Bulleen Boomers	103
Canberra Capitals	78

== Season award winners ==
Award	Winner	Position	Team
Most Valuable Player Award	Liz Cambage	Centre	Bulleen Boomers
Grand Final MVP Award	Sharin Milner	Guard	Bulleen Boomers
Rookie of the Year Award	Gretel Tippett	Forward	Logan Thunder
Defensive Player of the Year Award	Rachael Flanagan	Guard	Townsville Fire
Coach of the Year Award	Tom Maher	Coach	Bulleen Boomers
Top Shooter Award	Liz Cambage	Centre	Bulleen Boomers
All-Star Five	Liz Cambage; Marianna Tolo; Amy Denson; Jenna O'Hea; Kathleen MacLeod	Centre; Forward; Forward; Guard/Forward; Guard	Bulleen Boomers; Canberra Capitals; Sydney Uni Flames; Bulleen Boomers; Dandenong Rangers

== Statistics leaders ==
Category	Player	Team	GP	Totals	Average
Points Per Game	Liz Cambage	Bulleen Boomers	22	490	22.3
Rebounds Per Game	Cayla Francis	Logan Thunder	22	204	9.3
Assists Per Game	Kristen Veal	Logan Thunder	22	127	5.8
Steals Per Game	Kristen Veal	Logan Thunder	22	55	2.5
Blocks per game	Liz Cambage	Bulleen Boomers	22	62	2.8
Field Goal %	Liz Cambage	Bulleen Boomers	22	(187/314)	59.6%
Three-Point Field Goal %	Rebecca Mercer	West Coast Waves	19	(26/62)	41.9%
Free Throw %	Angela Marino	Adelaide Lightning	20	(70/78)	89.7%
