= 2002–03 WNBL season =

- League: Women's National Basketball League
- Sport: Basketball
- Duration: October 2002 – February 2003
- Number of teams: 8
- TV partner(s): ABC

Regular season
- Top seed: Canberra Capitals
- Season MVP: Lauren Jackson (Canberra Capitals)
- Top scorer: Lauren Jackson (Canberra Capitals)

Finals
- Champions: Canberra Capitals
- Runners-up: Sydney Flames
- Finals MVP: Lauren Jackson (Canberra Capitals)

WNBL seasons
- ← 2001–02 2003–04 →

The 2002–03 WNBL season was the 23rd season of competition since its establishment in 1981. A total of 8 teams contested the league.

== Team standings ==
#	WNBL Championship Ladder				
#	Team	W	L	PCT	GP
1	Canberra Capitals	16	5	76.0	21
2	Townsville Fire	15	6	71.0	21
3	Sydney Flames	14	7	67.0	21
4	Adelaide Lightning	12	9	57.0	21
5	Dandenong Rangers	11	10	52.0	21
6	Bulleen Boomers	6	15	29.0	21
7	Perth Lynx	6	15	29.0	21
8	AIS	4	17	19.00	21

== Finals ==
Semifinals
Canberra Capitals	68
Townsville Fire	67
Sydney Flames	72 (OT)
Adelaide Lightning	70

Preliminary final
Townsville Fire	78
Sydney Flames	83

Grand final
Canberra Capitals	69
Sydney Flames	67

== Season award winners ==
Award	Winner	Team
Most Valuable Player Award	Lauren Jackson	Canberra Capitals
Grand Final MVP Award	Lauren Jackson	Canberra Capitals
Rookie of the Year Award	Kelly Wilson	AIS
Defensive Player of the Year Award	Natalie Porter	Townsville Fire
Coach of the Year Award	David Herbert	Townsville Fire
Top Shooter Award	Lauren Jackson	Canberra Capitals

== Statistics leaders ==
Category	Player	Team	GP	Totals	Average
Points Per Game	Lauren Jackson	Canberra Capitals	17	462	27.2
Rebounds Per Game	Lauren Jackson	Canberra Capitals	17	197	11.6
Assists Per Game	Kristen Veal	Canberra Capitals	21	113	5.4
Steals Per Game	Narelle Fletcher	Dandenong Rangers	21	54	2.6
Blocks per game	Jennifer Crouse	Perth Lynx	21	88	4.2
Field Goal %	Lauren Jackson	Canberra Capitals	17	(173/318)	54.4%
Three-Point Field Goal %	Carly Wilson	Dandenong Rangers	21	(24/63)	38.1%
Free Throw %	Belinda Snell	Sydney Flames	21	(59/70)	84.3%
