= 2008–09 WNBL season =

- League: Women's National Basketball League
- Sport: Basketball
- Duration: October 2008 – March 2009
- Teams: 10
- TV partner: ABC

Regular season
- Top seed: Canberra Capitals
- Season MVP: Rohanee Cox (Townsville Fire)
- Top scorer: Rohanee Cox (Townsville Fire)

Finals
- Champions: Canberra Capitals
- Runners-up: Bulleen Boomers
- Finals MVP: Natalie Hurst (Canberra Capitals)

WNBL seasons
- ← 2007–08 2009–10 →

The 2008–09 WNBL season was the 29th season of competition since its establishment in 1981. A total of 10 teams contested the league. The regular season was played between October 2008 and March 2009, followed by a post-season involving the top five in March 2009.

Broadcast rights were held by free-to-air network ABC. ABC broadcast one game a week, at 1:00PM at every standard time in Australia.

Molten provided equipment including the official game ball, with Hoop2Hoop supplying team apparel.

== Team standings ==
#	WNBL Championship Ladder				
#	Team	W	L	PCT	GP
1	Canberra Capitals	19	3	86.36	22
2	Bulleen Boomers	17	5	77.27	22
3	Townsville Fire	16	6	72.73	22
4	Adelaide Lightning	15	7	68.18	22
5	Bendigo Spirit	14	8	63.64	22
6	Sydney Uni Flames	9	13	40.91	22
7	Dandenong Rangers	7	15	31.82	22
8	Logan Thunder	7	15	31.82	22
9	Perth Lynx	4	18	18.18	22
10	Australian Institute of Sport	2	20	9.09	22

== Finals ==
Elimination final
4	Adelaide Lightning	81
5	Bendigo Spirit	73

Semifinals
1	Canberra Capitals	60
2	Bulleen Boomers	52
3	Townsville Fire	91
4	Adelaide Lightning	78

Preliminary final
Bulleen Boomers	79
Townsville Fire	68

Grand final
Canberra Capitals	61
Bulleen Boomers	58

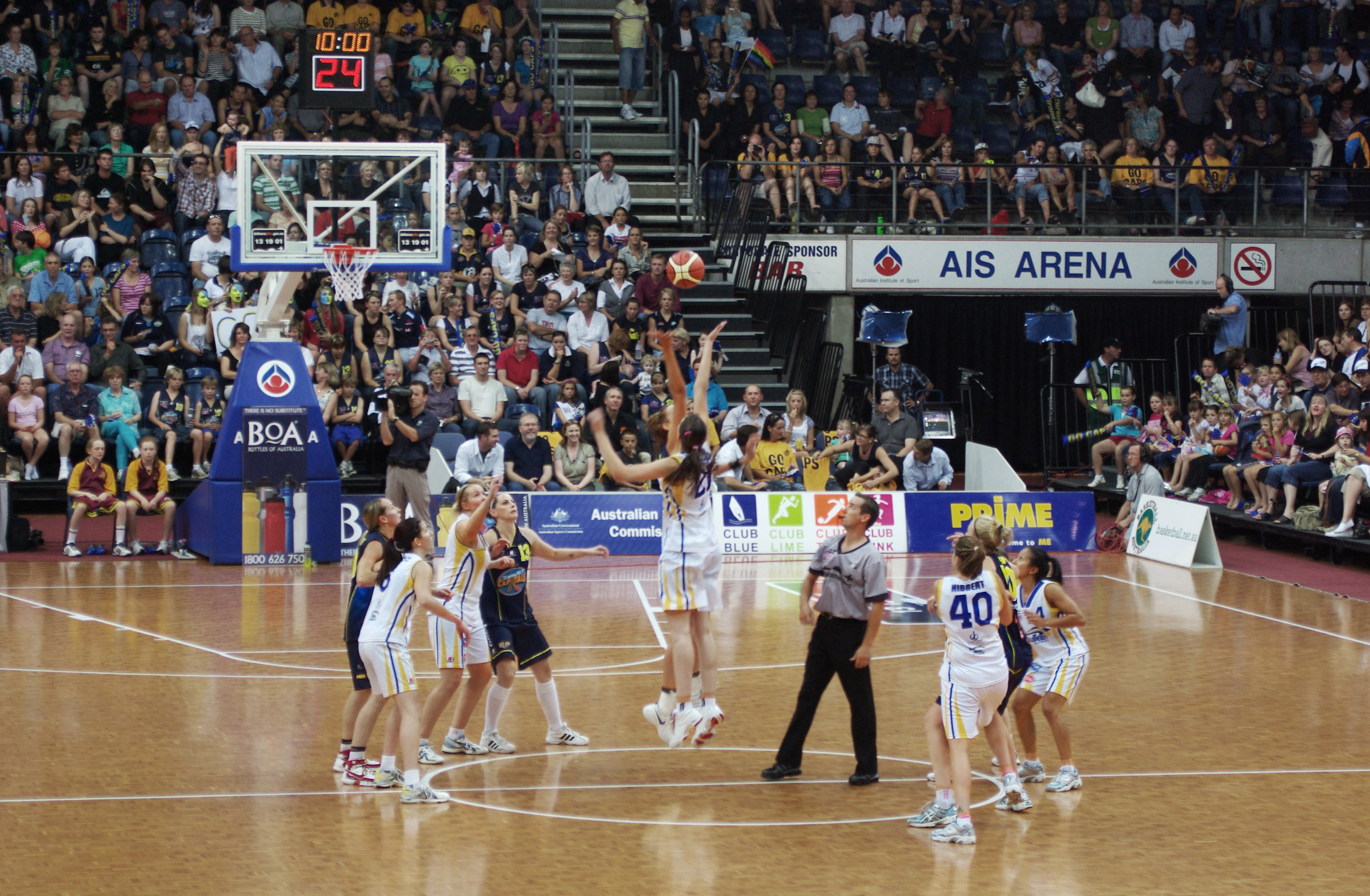
2009 WNBL Grand Final Tip-off at AIS Arena, Capitals vs Boomers

== Season award winners ==
Award	Winner	Team
Most Valuable Player Award	Rohanee Cox	Townsville Fire
Grand Final MVP Award	Natalie Hurst	Canberra Capitals
Rookie of the Year Award	Sarah Graham	Logan Thunder
Defensive Player of the Year Award	Alicia Poto	Sydney Uni Flames
Coach of the Year Award	Cheryl Chambers	Bulleen Boomers
Top Shooter Award	Rohanee Cox	Townsville Fire

== Statistics leaders ==
Category	Player	Team	GP	Totals	Average
Points Per Game	Rohanee Cox	Townsville Fire	22	466	21.2
Rebounds Per Game	Abby Bishop	Canberra Capitals	22	235	10.7
Assists Per Game	Kristi Harrower	Bendigo Spirit	19	112	5.9
Steals Per Game	Alicia Poto	Sydney Uni Flames	21	52	2.5
Blocks per game	Jennifer Crouse	Townsville Fire	22	55	2.5
Field Goal %	Elizabeth Cambage	AIS	16	(87/139)	62.6%
Three-Point Field Goal %	Lisa Pardon	Bulleen Boomers	22	(31/68)	45.6%
Free Throw %	Deanna Smith	Perth Lynx	17	(87/97)	89.7%
