= Marianna Tolo =

Australian basketball player (born 1989)

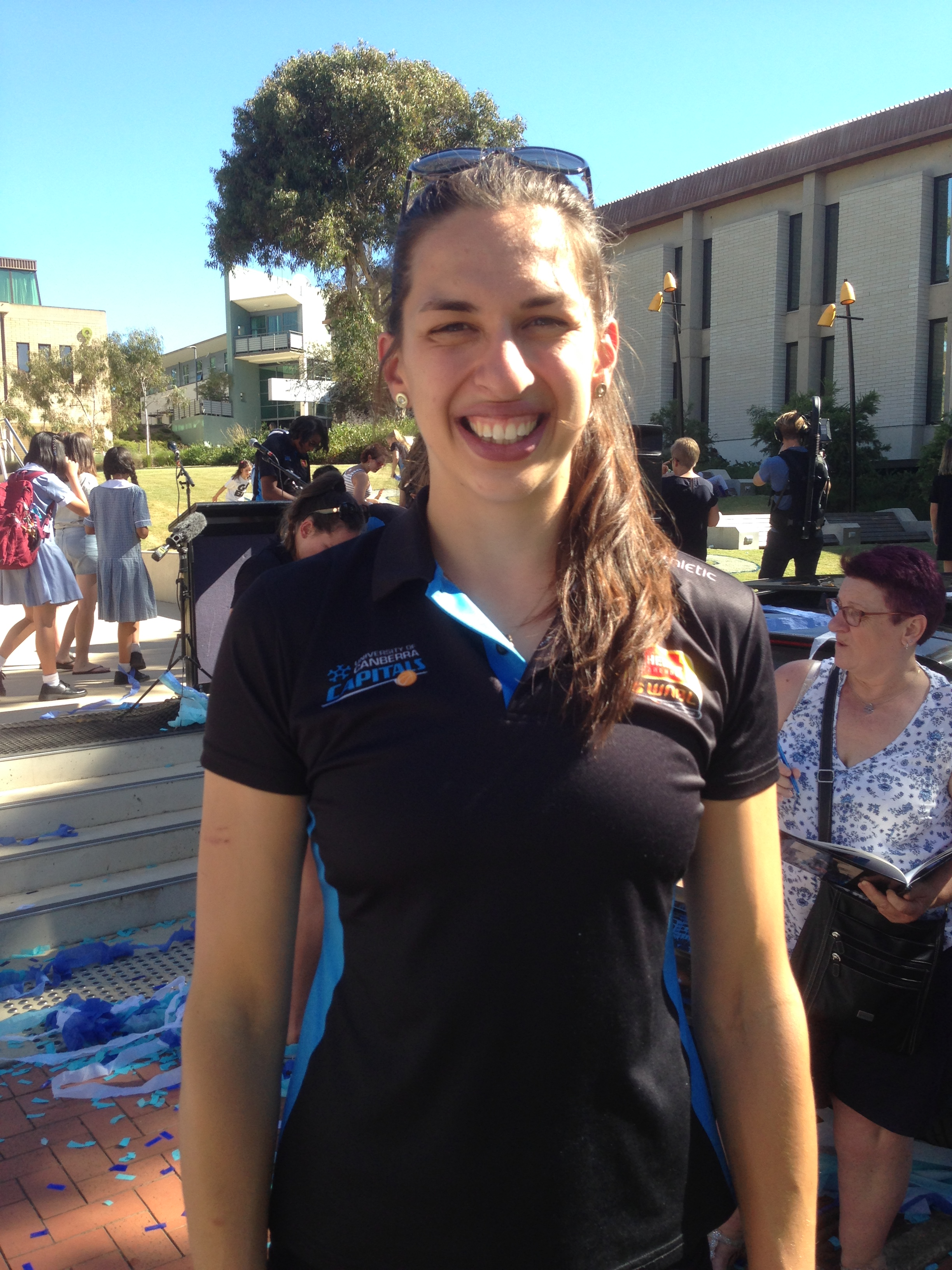
- Tolo with the UC Capitals in 2019

Personal information
- Born: 2 July 1989 (age 37) Mackay, Queensland
- Listed height: 6 ft 5 in (1.96 m)

Career information
- Playing career: 2006–present
- Position: Center

Career history
- 2006–2008: Australian Institute of Sport
- 2008–2012: Canberra Capitals
- 2012–2013: Pays d'Aix Basket 13
- 2013–2015: CJM Bourges Basket
- 2015: Los Angeles Sparks
- 2016–2020: Canberra Capitals
- 2024–present: Bendigo Spirit

Career highlights
- 5× WNBL champion (2009, 2010, 2019, 2019–20, 2025); 2× WNBL All-Star Five (2011, 2017); WNBL Defensive Player of the Year (2017)
- Stats at WNBA.com
- Stats at Basketball Reference
Medals
Women's basketball
Representing Australia
Olympic Games
Bronze medal – third place	2024 Paris	Team
FIBA World Cup
Bronze medal – third place	2014 Turkey
Bronze medal – third place	2022 Australia
FIBA Asia Cup
Silver medal – second place	2017 India

Marianna Tolo (born 2 July 1989) is an Australian basketball player. She has played the majority of her career in the Women's National Basketball League (WNBL) and has been a member of the Australia women's national basketball team. She has played for the Los Angeles Sparks in the WNBA. At the 2024 Summer Olympics she earned a bronze medal with the Australian team.

== Personal life ==
Tolo was born in Mackay, Queensland, on 2 July 1989. At 1.96 m (6 ft 5 in) tall, she is one of the tallest players on the Canberra Capitals' roster. In March 2011, she attended the Sport for Women Day at the University of Canberra and participated in an outdoor Zumba class alongside some of her University of Canberra Capitals teammates. Tolo and Carly Wilson share a house, where they have hosted a party for the University of Canberra Capitals.

== Juniors ==
Tolo was a member of the Queensland North squad in 2003 and 2004 during the Australian U16 Championships. She was a member of the Queensland North squad in 2005 and 2006 during the Australian U18 Championships. She was a member of the Queensland squad in 2007 and 2008 during the Australian U20 Championships.

== Australian Institute of Sport ==
In 2006, Tolo earned a scholarship at the Australian Institute of Sport (AIS) for basketball. She competed in the 2006/2007, and 2007/2008 AIS squads that played in the WNBL.

== Canberra Capitals ==
=== 2008/2009 and 2009/2010: early years ===
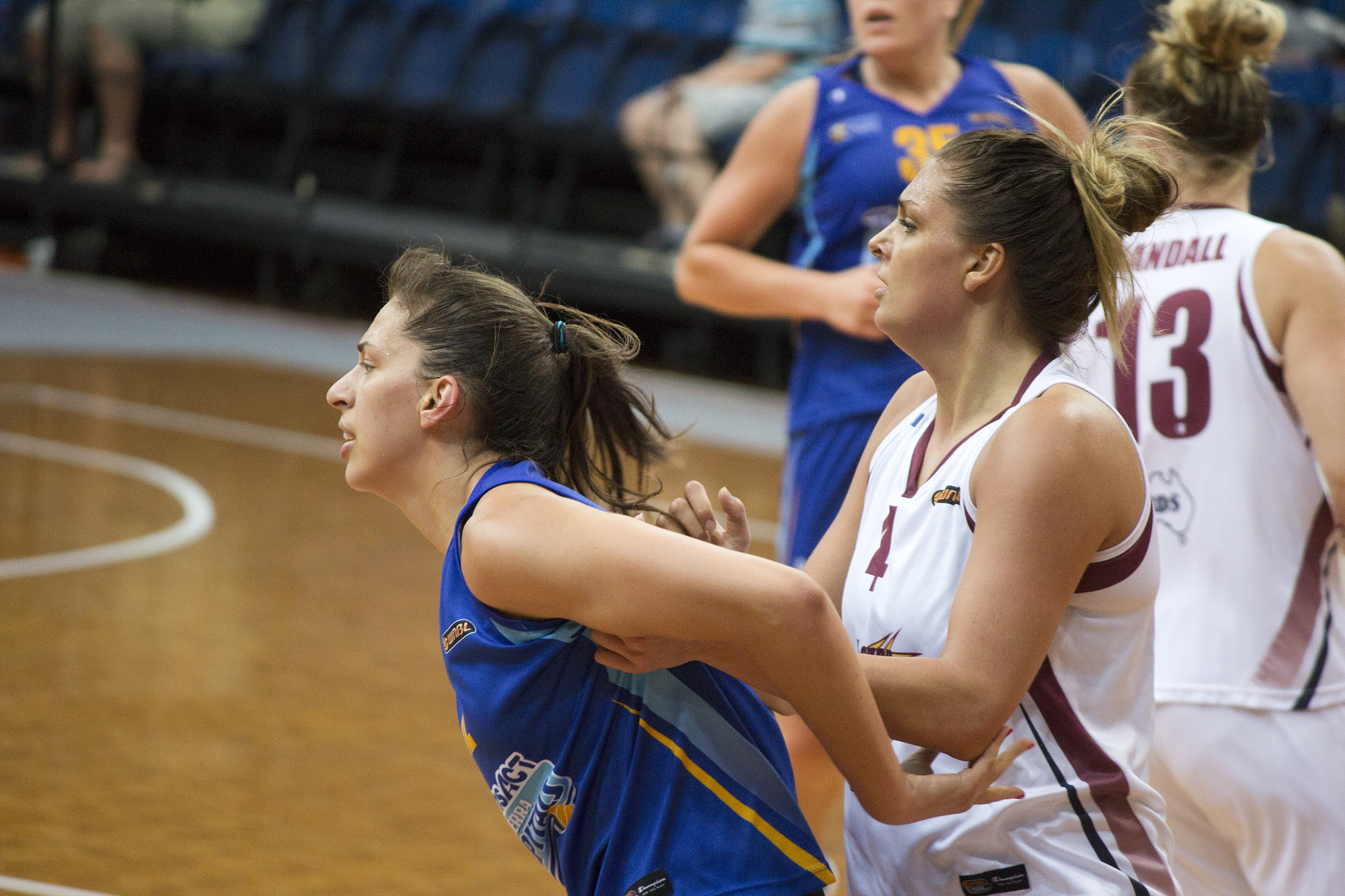
Tolo in a 2011/2012 game for Canberra Capitals

Tolo was a member of the 2008/2009 Canberra Capitals squad that won the WNBL championship. During the regular season, she was not a regular starter.

During the 2009/2010 season, Tolo set a WNBL record for the most shots blocked in a single game when she blocked 13 in a 5 November 2009 game against the Townsville Fire. In an October 2009 game, she scored 21 points in a game against the Adelaide Lightning. She played in the team's Grand Finals victory over the Bulleen Boomers, where she was primarily guarding Elizabeth Cambage. She was the team's season MVP.

=== 2010/2011 ===
Tolo played for the Canberra Capitals again during the 2010/2011 season. She was one of the reasons the Capitals beat Townsville in Townsville for the first time in two years. In an October 2010 game, she scored 12 points and had 13 rebounds in a game against the Sydney Uni Flames. She played in the Preliminary Final game against the Bendigo Spirit in a game the Capitals won 83–78. She was one of the team's three leading scorers with 20 points. According to Tolo, she "was running on fumes toward the back end of last season." She was the team's season MVP this season, with 8.4 rebounds and average 13.4 points a game. At the end of the season, she was named a member of the WNBL All Star Five. During the team's Mad Monday celebration at the end of the season, Tolo dressed as Xena: Warrior Princess. At the immediate end of the season, she was one of several players from the 2010/2011 squad who did not have a contract with the team for the 2011/2012 season.

=== 2011/2012 ===
Canberra Capitals vs Townsville. Tolo is the tall player in blue.

Porter takes the floor to relieve Tolo during a 15 October 2011 game against the Townsville Fire.

Between WNBL seasons, Tolo played for the national team but did not play for a club team in a league like the SEABL. She participated in the team's first training session for the season on 13 September 2011 at the Belconnen Basketball Centre. In one of Canberra's opening games of the season, she led the team in scoring with 12 points in a loss against Dandengong. In a 13 November 2011 game against the West Coast Waves, she scored 21 points, had seven rebounds, and seven assists. On 18 December 2011, 85–78 victory over the Bulleen Boomers, she scored 22 points, and was one of Canberra's top three scorers. In 2011/2012, Tolo's height was used as part of the strategy to scare and intimidate other teams. It was used in the game against the Australian Institute of Sport team in early December. In the game right before the WNBL broke for the holiday against the Bulleen Boomers, she injured her ankle. The local press asserted that Tolo herself with the team, had become a more responsible team member and was taking more shots during games.

The Townsville Fire tried to sign her at the end of the season when she became a free agent.

Tolo moved to France to play for Aix En Provence in the Ligue Féminine de Basket with former AIS teammate Cayla Francis in August 2012. Tolo later played for the CJM Bourges Basket before the 2013–2014 season.

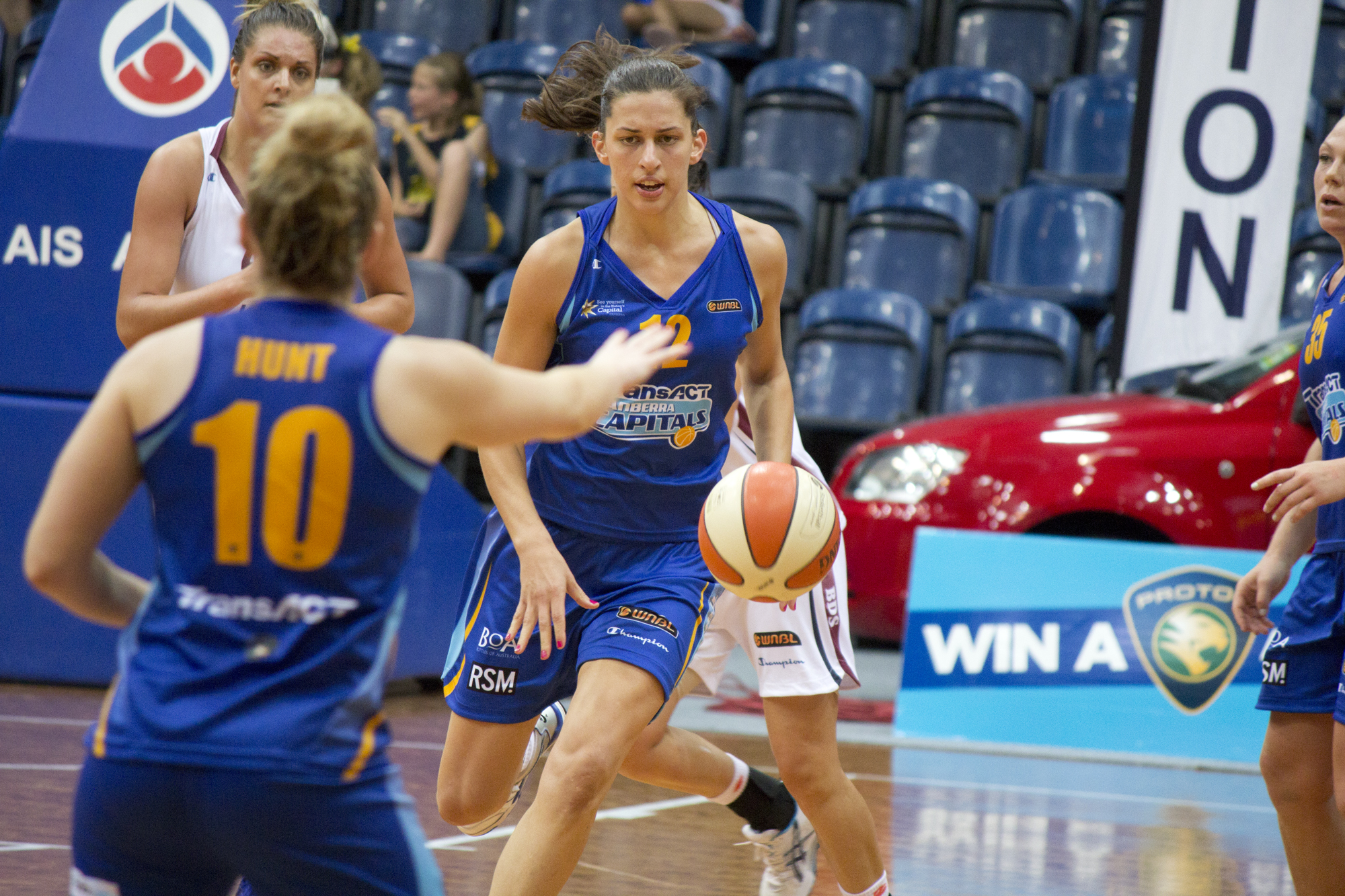
Tolo during a 2011/2012 season game

== SEABL ==
In 2010, Tolo played for the Nunawading Spectres in the SEABL season held between the end of the 2009/2010 WNBL season and start of the 2010/2011 season. Tolo contemplated playing for a Canberra-based SEABL team during the Canberra Capitals off-season in 2012.

== WNBA ==
On 9 February 2015 Tolo signed with the WNBA's Los Angeles Sparks.

== National team ==
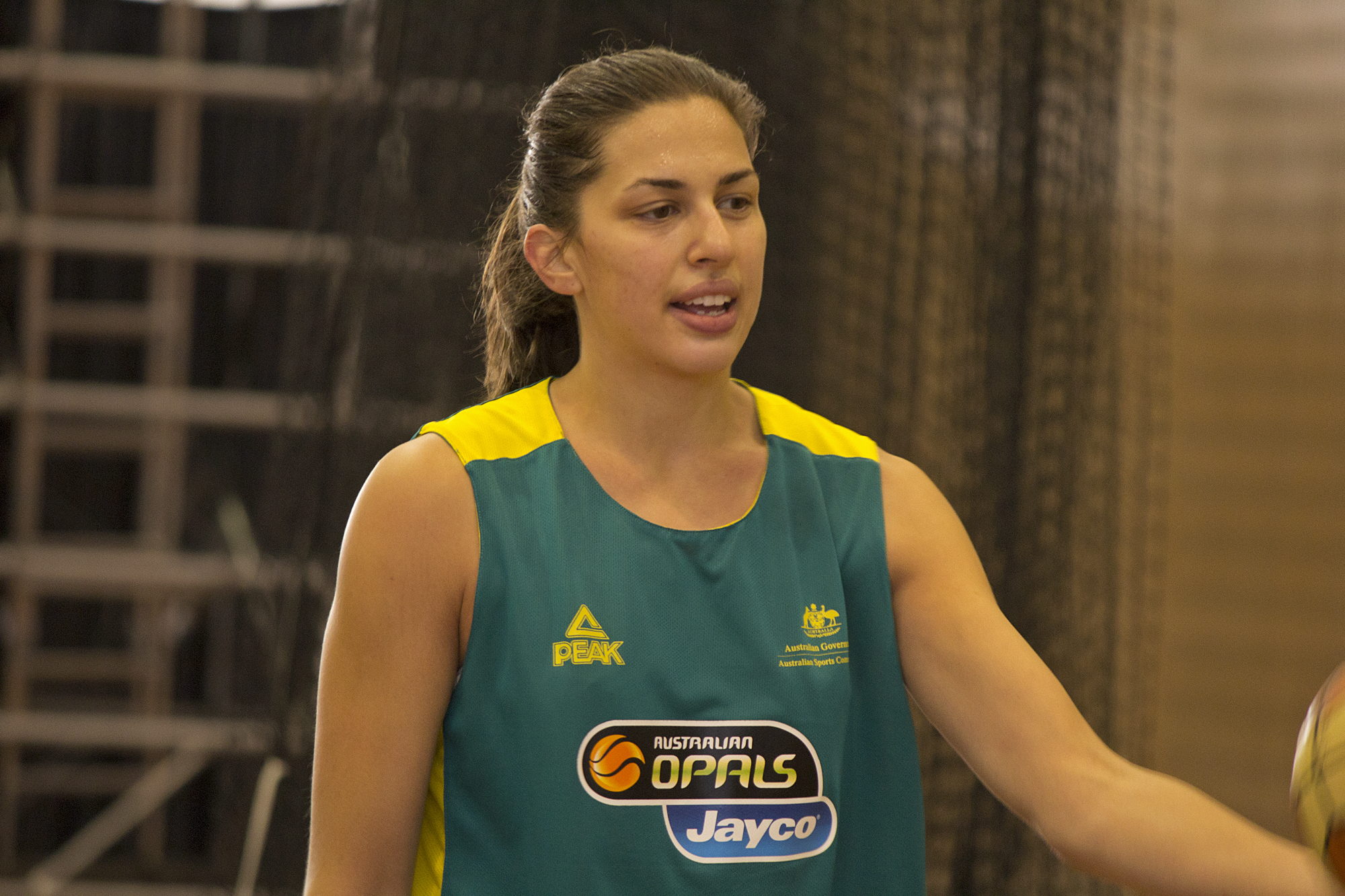
Tolo at day two of the Opals camp

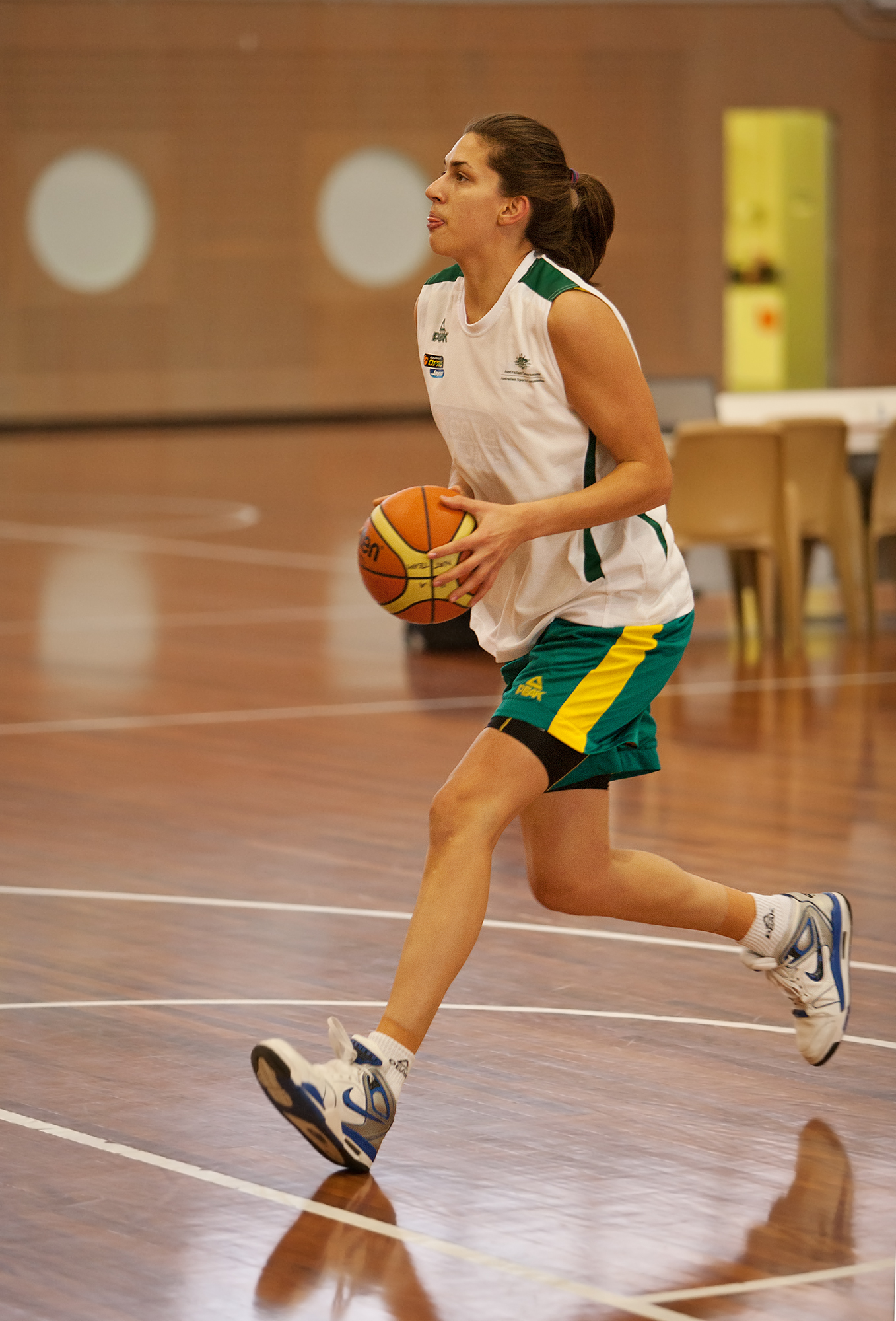
Tolo at day two of the Opals camp

Tolo was a member of the junior national team, where she had 31 caps. As a member of this team, she competed at the 2006 FIBA Oceania U19 Championships. She as a member of the senior team in 2007, where she was part of the team that competed at the 2007 FIBA Oceania Women's Championships. She was a member of the national squad during 2008. In late March, early April 2008, she participated in a week-long training camp with the national team in Canberra. She was part of the 2009 national side selected to compete against the New Zealand national team during the Oceania Championship, where her team took home gold.

She was a member of the national team in 2010. Tolo was supposed to compete in a Salamanca Invitational Basketball Tournament game against Spain, but had to miss the match because of a bad ankle. In 2010, she also competed for Australia at the FIBA Women's World Championships. In July 2011, she participated in the Olympic qualification competition. Tolo was named to the Australia women's national basketball team that competed in the 2012 Summer Olympics qualifying tournament. As of January 2012, she had 47 caps for the national team. In late April and early May 2012, she was one of four of Australia's "big" players to participate in a special training camp for the team. She was scheduled to participate in the national team training camp held from 14 to 18 May 2012 at the Australian Institute of Sport.

Tolo was a member for the national team for the 2014 FIBA World Championships. The team beat host nation Turkey to finish with the bronze medal. In this tournament Tolo led her team in scoring with an average of 12.2 PPG (13th in the tournament), led her team in field goal percentage with an average of 56% FG (1st in the tournament), led her team in free throw percentage with an average of 85% FT (2nd in the tournament) and tied in her team for blocked shots at 1.0 per game (tied for 6th in the tournament).

Tolo, like all the other members of the 2020 Tokyo Olympics Opals women's basketball team, had a difficult tournament. The Opals lost their first two group stage matches. They had a disappointing match against Belgium and then lost to China in heartbreaking circumstances. In their last group match the Opals needed to beat Puerto Rico by 25 or more in their final match to progress. This they did by 27 in a very exciting match. However, they lost to the United States in their quarterfinal 79 to 55.

== Career statistics ==
Legend
GP	Games played	GS	Games started	MPG	Minutes per game	RPG	Rebounds per game
APG	Assists per game	SPG	Steals per game	BPG	Blocks per game	PPG	Points per game
TO	Turnovers per game	FG%	Field-goal percentage	3P%	3-point field-goal percentage	FT%	Free-throw percentage
**Bold**	Career best	°	League leader

=== WNBA ===
WNBA regular season statistics
Year	Team	GP	GS	MPG	FG%	3P%	FT%	RPG	APG	SPG	BPG	TO	PPG
2015	Los Angeles	28	14	19.0	.462	.000	.806	3.0	1.0	0.3	1.0	1.0	4.9
**Career**	1 year, 1 team	28	14	19.0	.462	.000	.806	3.0	1.0	0.3	1.0	1.0	4.9

== See also ==
- List of Australian WNBA players
