= 2007–08 WNBL season =

- League: Women's National Basketball League
- Sport: Basketball
- Duration: October 2007 – March 2008
- Number of teams: 10
- TV partner(s): ABC

Regular season
- Top seed: Adelaide Link
- Season MVP: Natalie Porter (Sydney Uni Flames)
- Top scorer: Natalie Porter (Sydney Uni Flames)

Finals
- Champions: Adelaide Link
- Runners-up: Sydney Uni Flames
- Finals MVP: Renae Camino (Adelaide Link)

WNBL seasons
- ← 2006–07 2008–09 →

The 2007–08 WNBL season was the 28th season of competition since its establishment in 1981. A total of 10 teams contested the league. The regular season was played between October 2007 and March 2008, followed by a post-season involving the top five in March 2008.

Broadcast rights were held by free-to-air network ABC. ABC broadcast one game a week, at 1:00PM at every standard time in Australia.

Molten provided equipment including the official game ball, with Hoop2Hoop supplying team apparel.

== Team standings ==
#	WNBL Championship Ladder				
#	Team	W	L	PCT	GP
1	Adelaide Link	21	3	87.5	24
2	Sydney Uni Flames	17	7	70.83	24
3	Canberra Capitals	17	7	70.83	24
4	Dandenong Rangers	12	12	50	24
5	Bulleen Boomers	11	13	45.83	24
6	Townsville Fire	10	14	41.67	24
7	Bendigo Spirit	10	14	41.67	24
8	Christchurch	9	15	37.5	24
9	AIS	8	16	33.33	24
10	Perth Lynx	5	19	20.83	24

== Finals ==
Semifinals
Adelaide Lightning	71
Sydney Uni Flames	90
Canberra Capitals	54
Dandenong Rangers	60

Preliminary final
Adelaide Lightning	74
Dandenong Rangers	64

Grand final
Sydney Uni Flames	82
Adelaide Lightning	92

== Season award winners ==
Award	Winner	Team
Most Valuable Player Award	Natalie Porter	Sydney Uni Flames
Grand Final MVP Award	Renae Camino	Adelaide Link
Rookie of the Year Award	Nicole Hunt	AIS
Defensive Player of the Year Award	Emily McInerny	Dandenong Rangers
Coach of the Year Award	Carrie Graf	Canberra Capitals
Top Shooter Award	Natalie Porter	Sydney Uni Flames

== Statistics leaders ==
Category	Player	Team	GP	Totals	Average
Points Per Game	Natalie Porter	Sydney Uni Flames	23	566	24.6
Rebounds Per Game	Jennifer Crouse	Townsville Fire	24	290	12.1
Assists Per Game	Kathleen MacLeod	Bendigo Spirit	24	127	5.3
Steals Per Game	Tully Bevilaqua	Canberra Capitals	22	57	2.6
Blocks per game	Jennifer Crouse	Townsville Fire	24	55	2.3
Field Goal %	Tracey Beatty	Canberra Capitals	24	(113/194)	58.2%
Three-Point Field Goal %	Jessica Foley	Adelaide Link	23	(34/72)	47.2%
Free Throw %	Kathleen MacLeod	Bendigo Spirit	24	(105/126)	83.3%
