= 1984 WNBL season =

- League: Women's National Basketball League (WNBL)
- Sport: Basketball
- Number of teams: 11
- TV partner(s): ABC

Regular season
- Top seed: West Adelaide Bearcats
- Season MVP: (Australia) Julie Nykiel
- Top scorer: (Australia) Julie Nykiel

Finals
- Champions: Nunawading Spectres
- Runners-up: West Adelaide Bearcats

WNBL seasons
- ← 1983 1985 →

The 1984 WNBL season (Women's National Basketball League) was the fourth season of competition since its establishment in 1981. A total of 11 teams contested the league.

== Ladder ==
	Team	Played	Won	Lost	Won %
1	West Adelaide Bearcats	18	14	4	78
2	Nunawading Spectres	17	13	4	76
3	Noarlunga Tigers	18	12	6	67
4	North Adelaide Rockets	18	12	6	67
5	Bankstown Bruins	18	12	6	67
6	Coburg Cougars	17	11	6	65
7	Brisbane Lady Bullets	10	5	5	50
8	Australian Institute of Sport	18	5	13	28
9	Bulleen Melbourne Boomers	18	5	13	28
10	St Kilda Saints	18	3	15	17
11	Sutherland Sharks	18	2	16	11

== Finals ==
Semi-finals
1	West Adelaide Bearcats	62
4	North Adelaide Rockets	60
3	Noarlunga Tigers	48
2	Nunawading Spectres	75

Grand Final
1	West Adelaide Bearcats	65
2	Nunawading Spectres	78

== 1984 WNBL Awards ==
Award	Winner	Team
Most Valuable Player Award	(Australia) Julie Nykiel	Noarlunga Tigers
Top Shooter Award	(Australia) Julie Nykiel	Noarlunga Tigers
