= Gina Stevens =

Australian basketball player

Australian Institute of Sport Perth Breakers Bulleen Boomers Townsville Fire
- Position: Forward
- League: WNBL

Personal information
- Born: 4 July 1975 (age 51) Ballarat, Victoria, Australia
- Listed height: 6 ft 0 in (1.83 m)

Georgina (Gina) Stevens (born 4 July 1975) is a retired Australian women's basketball player, who represented the country at both junior and senior levels.

== Biography ==
=== WNBL ===
Stevens played in the Women's National Basketball League (WNBL) between 1992 and 2004. During that period Stevens played for four teams; AIS (1992 to 1993), Perth Breakers (1994 to 1999/00), Bulleen Boomers (2000/01) and Townsville Fire (2002/03 to 2003/04), totaling 204 games.

In 1996, Stevens won the WNBL Top Shooter Award with 375 points at an average of 21.3 points per game. Stevens was also selected to the WNBL All-Star Five on two occasions; 1996 and 1998/99.

=== SBL ===
Stevens played 97 games in the State Basketball League (SBL) between 1994 and 2003. She played for the Stirling Senators in 1994, 1995, 1996, 1998, 2002 and 2003, and had one season with the Mandurah Magic in 2000. She had a 55-point game for the Senators in 2002.

=== National team ===
At official FIBA tournaments, Stevens played for Australia at the 1993 World Championship for Junior Women, where she won a Gold medal.

== See also ==
- WNBL Top Shooter Award
- WNBL All-Star Five
