= Jennifer Crouse =

American basketball player

Personal information
- Born: May 23, 1977 (age 49) Freeport, Illinois
- Listed height: 6 ft 4 in (1.93 m)

Career information
- High school: Freeport (Freeport, Illinois)
- College: North Dakota (1995–1999)
- WNBA draft: 1999: undrafted
- Playing career: 1999–2009
- Position: Center

Career history
- 1999–2000: CB Santa Rosa de Lima (Spain)
- 2002–2003: Perth Lynx (Australia)
- 2003–2004: Athens (Greece)
- 2004–2005: Saarlouis Royals (Germany)
- 2005–2009: Townsville Fire (Australia)

Career highlights
- WNBL All-Star Five (2009)

Jennifer Crouse (born May 23, 1977) is an American retired professional basketball player.

== Career ==
=== College ===
In college, Crouse attended University of North Dakota in Grand Forks, North Dakota, playing for the Fighting Sioux (It was controversially named Fighting Sioux at the time) in NCAA Division II. Whilst completing her degree in 2001, Crouse would remain on board as the Assistant Coach of the UND Women's basketball team. Until she decided to pursue her professional career in Australia.

=== WNBA ===
After her college career, Crouse was signed by the Phoenix Mercury for the 1999 WNBA season. However, she was waived one month later. The following year, Crouse was invited to the Miami Sol's training camp before the 2000 WNBA season. Crouse was released before the season began.

=== Europe ===
After completing her years with the Fighting Sioux, Crouse then travelled to Barcelona, Spain, signing with CB Santa Rosa de Lima for the 1999–2000 Liga Femenina de Baloncesto season. After a season in Australia, Crouse returned to Europe and signed with an Athens side in the A1 Ethiniki Basketball for the 2003–04 season. She would then travel west and sign with Saarlouis Royals for the 2004–05 season of Germany's Damen-Basketball-Bundesliga.

=== Australia ===
In 2002, after strong showings with the Lakeside Lightning in Western Australia's State Basketball League, Crouse was signed by the Perth Lynx for the 2002–03 WNBL season. Averaging 4.2 blocks per game, Crouse currently holds the record for most blocks recorded in one season (88 blocks). In 2005, Crouse was signed by the Townsville Fire. She would remain a strong member of the Fire roster for four seasons. For the 2008–09 WNBL season, Crouse was named to the WNBL All-Star Five. The Fire narrowly missed out on the Grand Final, losing to Bulleen in the Preliminary Final. At the conclusion of the season, Crouse shockingly announced her retirement from basketball and that she was returning to America. Crouse ranks highly in several WNBL records for her blocking and rebounding efforts.
