= Perth Lynx =

Western Australian women's basketball team

- Leagues: WNBL
- Founded: 1988; 38 years ago
- History: Perth Breakers; 1988–2001; Perth Lynx; 2001–2010; 2015–present West Coast Waves; 2010–2015
- Arena: Perth High Performance Centre
- Capacity: 4,500
- Location: Perth, Western Australia
- Team colors: Red, peach, black
- Main sponsor: Northern Star Resources
- CEO: Craig Hutchison
- Chairman: Christian Hauff; Jodi Millhahn
- General manager: Chris Earl
- Head coach: Ryan Petrik
- Team captain: Anneli Maley; Alex Ciabattoni
- Ownership: Sports Entertainment Group (majority owners)
- Championships: 1 (1992)
- Website: perthlynx.wnbl.com.au

The Perth Lynx are an Australian professional basketball team based in Perth, Western Australia. The Lynx compete in the Women's National Basketball League (WNBL) and play their home games at Perth High Performance Centre. For sponsorship reasons, they are known as the Northern Star Resources Perth Lynx.

The Lynx were established in 1988 as the Perth Breakers. After being owned and operated by Basketball Western Australia from 2001 to 2015, the Perth Wildcats took over ownership and operation of the team for a period of five years. In 2020, the licence was transferred back to Basketball Western Australia. In 2024, the licence was transferred to Sports Entertainment Group's sporting teams business, SEN Teams. The Lynx have reached six WNBL Grand Finals, winning their only championship in 1992.

== History ==
=== WAIS Rockets (1987) ===
In 1985, the Western Australian Basketball Federation sent its senior women's team to the Australian women's club championships. Prior to the championships, WA was seen as at least two years away from a national conference berth. After the team went 5–1 at the championships, WA was granted entry into the Women's Basketball Conference (WBC), a second-tier national league under the Women's National Basketball League (WNBL). Former Australian representative Sue Harcus was a key figure in getting a WA side into the national competition. The entry was seen as a two-year apprenticeship on the basis that they paid their own airfares in the first two years. The team debuted in the WBC in 1986, funded by the Western Australian Institute of Sport (WAIS) and the WA Basketball Federation, and backed by Adidas. Harcus served as assistant coach under head coach Dave Hancock. The team endured tough travel schedules, sometimes playing three games in 36 hours or four games in five days. In 12 games, the team had five wins and seven losses.

In 1987, the team was known as the WAIS Rockets. For WA to be admitted to the WNBL, the state was told that the Rockets had to win the 1987 WBC title. That year, the Rockets played all of their games away from home including finals, finishing on top of the ladder with a 10–1 record and beating the Forestville Eagles in overtime to advance to the grand final, where they won the title 56–47 against the Knox Raiders. The Rockets featured Tanya Fisher and Cheryl Kickett-Tucker.

=== Perth Breakers (1988–2001) ===
The franchise debuted in the WNBL in the 1988 season as the Perth Breakers. The Rockets name was dropped due to the WNBL already having the North Adelaide Rockets in the league. The Breakers finished their inaugural season in ninth place with a 6–16 record.

In the 1989 WNBL season, the Breakers amassed a 9–8 record over the first half of the season. As a consequence of the 1989 pilot strike, the team withdrew from the season and their record was deleted from the ladder. The Breakers returned to action in the 1990 season. After playing at the Superdrome in Mount Claremont over their first two seasons, the side returned to its original venue at Perry Lakes Basketball Stadium.

The Breakers appeared in the WNBL finals every year between 1991 and 2000 except 1997, making grand final appearances in 1992, 1993 and 1999.

In the 1992 season, the Breakers won the WNBL championship behind captain Michele Timms and coach Tom Maher, along with Robyn Maher, Tanya Fisher, Natasha Bargeus, Lisa MacLean, Marynne Briggs and Marianna Vlahov. They defeated the Dandenong Rangers 58–54 in the grand final. Tom Maher won the Coach of the Year award; Robyn Maher was the league's Best Defensive Player, and Timms was recognised as the league's number one point guard.

In 1993, the Breakers made the Perth Entertainment Centre their new home venue. Under coach Guy Molloy, the Breakers returned to the grand final but lost 65–64 to the Sydney Flames.

In the 2000–01 season, the Breakers split their home games between Perry Lakes Stadium and Challenge Stadium.

=== Basketball WA's first ownership stint (2001–2015) ===
In 2001, just three months before round one of the new WNBL season, the owners handed back the licence and the players were told the club would fold. Basketball Western Australia subsequently took over the licence and changed the team name to Perth Lynx, which remained as such until 2010.

Basketball WA lacked money to pay players and coaches. The players had to pay for their own gym memberships and maintained full-time jobs. They also travelled on game day or took midnight flights to save money. Despite the challenges, Perth won four games in 2001–02 and six in 2002–03. The Lynx played exclusively at Perry Lakes Stadium in 2001–02.

After finishing last on the ladder in the 2009–10 WNBL season with a 2–20 record, the team was rebranded as the West Coast Waves for the 2010–11 WNBL season. The change symbolised the reinvigoration of the Basketball WA program under experienced head coach David Herbert and home-grown legend Tully Bevilaqua, and gave a nod to the team's history with the reintroduction of the black, green and gold colours. The Waves also debuted at the newly opened WA Basketball Centre.

On 1 November 2014, the Waves played a WNBL regular-season home game at Warwick Leisure Centre.

In 14 seasons under Basketball WA, the team failed to make a finals appearance.

=== Perth Wildcats management (2015–2020) ===
In April 2015, the team's licence was purchased by the Perth Wildcats and their chairman and owner Jack Bendat. The Wildcats subsequently brought back the Perth Lynx brand name and red colour.

In the 2015–16 season, the Lynx qualified for the finals for the first time since 2000. They went on to reach the grand final, their first since 1999, where they lost 2–0 to the Townsville Fire.

In the 2017–18 season, the Lynx won 14 consecutive games throughout the season and finished on top of the ladder, before losing four matches in a row after enduring seven flights in eight days. They lost to Canberra and Townsville in the final weekend of the regular season and were then swept 2–0 by fourth-placed Melbourne in the semi-finals.

In March 2018, the licence agreement with the Wildcats was extended.

=== Basketball WA's second ownership stint (2020–2024) ===
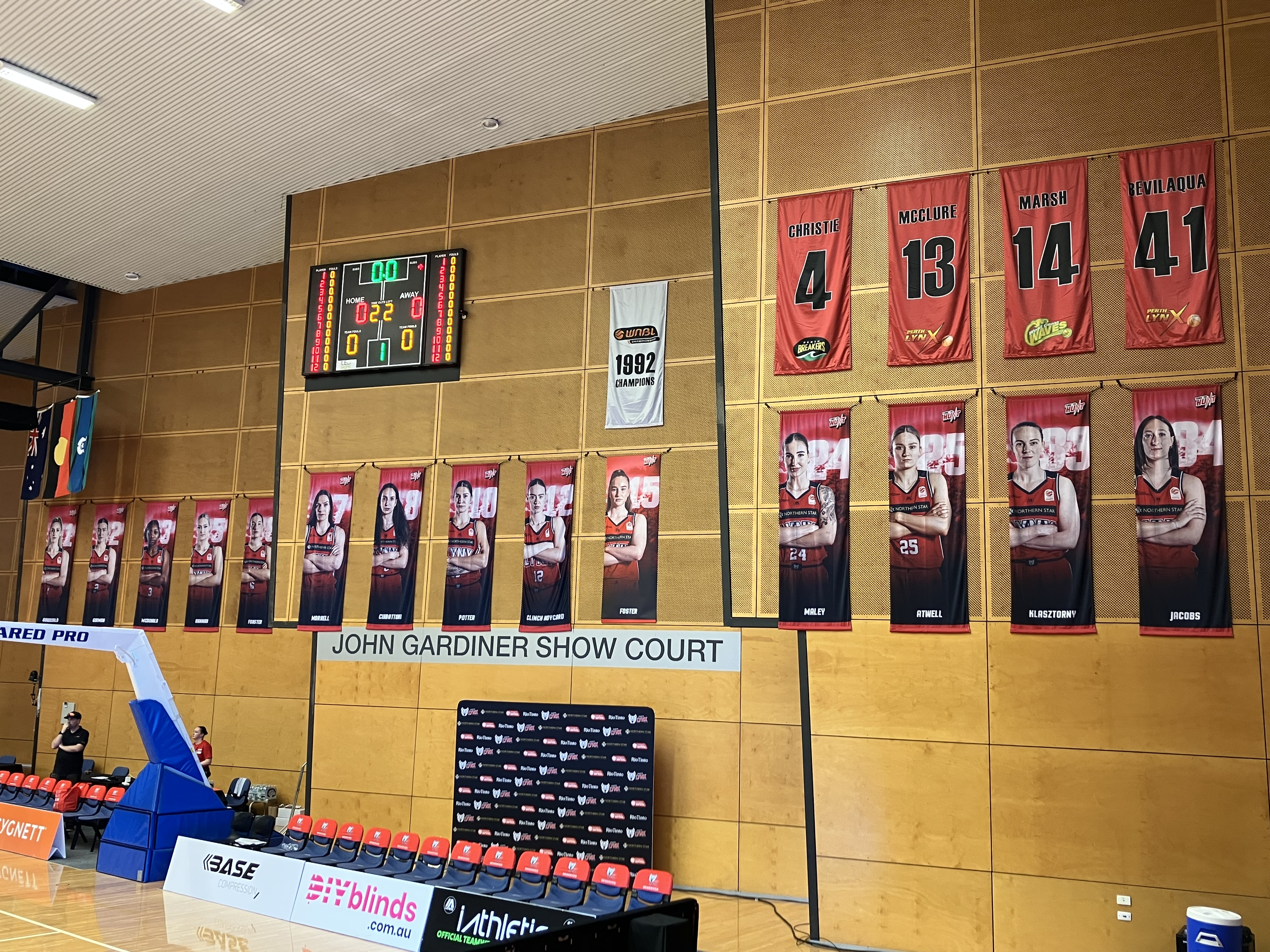
Perth Lynx banners at Bendat Basketball Centre, November 2023

In March 2020, the Perth Lynx's WNBL licence was transferred back to Basketball WA.

In the 2021–22 season, the Lynx finished in second place with an 11–5 record and reached the grand final, where they lost the series 2–1 to the Melbourne Boomers despite winning game one in Melbourne.

In the 2023–24 season, the Lynx finished in fourth place with an 11–10 record and defeated the first-placed Townsville Fire in the semi-finals to reach their second grand final series in three years. The Lynx won 101–79 in game one of the grand final series against the Southside Flyers. They became only the second team to ever score 100 points in a WNBL grand final and finished the game with 22 three-pointers. They went on to finish runners-up after losing game two 97–95 and game three 115–81. In the grand final game two at Bendat Basketball Centre, the Lynx set a club record attendance of 1,753.

=== New ownership (2024–present) ===
In May 2024, Perth business couple Christian Hauff and Jodi Millhahn were revealed as the front runners to take over ownership of the Perth Lynx from Basketball WA. The couple had earlier in the year become minor investors in Sports Entertainment Group's sporting teams business, SEN Teams. On 13 June 2024, the Lynx's WNBL licence was transferred to Perth Lynx Pty Ltd, owned by Hauff and Millhahn, with management and operational support from SEN Teams. On 10 December 2024, SEN Teams took over from Hauff and Millhahn as majority owners of the Lynx. Hauff and Millhahn remained shareholders and co-chairs of the club's board of directors.

During the pre-season in the lead up to the 2024–25 WNBL season, the Lynx played two games as part of HoopsFest at RAC Arena. During the 2024–25 regular season, the Lynx split their home games between Bendat Basketball Centre and the 4,000-capacity Perth High Performance Centre. They played three games at Perth High Performance Centre and made the venue their training base.

In June 2025, it was announced that all Lynx home games in the 2025–26 WNBL season would be played at Perth High Performance Centre. The following month, the club underwent a rebrand with a new logo. Following the mid-season addition of Chinese center Han Xu, the Lynx achieved a record crowd for Han's first home game at Perth HPC, with 3,121 fans attending the 98–81 win over the Southside Melbourne Flyers on 5 December 2025. The previous club record attendance was 1,753. On 15 January 2026, the Lynx played their first ever regular season game at RAC Arena as part of HoopsFest in Perth, winning 85–81 over the Bendigo Spirit. On 7 February 2026, co-captain Anneli Maley recorded 18 points, 10 rebounds and 10 assists in a 108–93 win over the Sydney Flames, becoming just the fifth player in club history to record a triple-double (after Michele Timms, Tully Bevilaqua, Deanna Smith and Melissa Marsh) and the first since Marsh in 2009. In the semi-finals, the Lynx defeated the Bendigo Spirit 2–0 to advance to their third WNBL Grand Final in five years. In game one of the grand final series in Townsville against the Townsville Fire, the Lynx lost 88–79. In game two at Perth HPC, the Lynx lost 108–105 in overtime to finish as runners-up for the third time in five years.

On 15 November 2026, the Lynx defeated the Southside Melbourne Flyers 114–80, posting the second-highest score in club history, behind their 124-point record set in 1999.

== Season-by-season records ==
Season	Standings	Regular season			Finals	Head coach
Season	Standings	W	L	PCT	Finals	Head coach
Perth Breakers
1988	9th	6	16	.273	Did not qualify	Dave Hancock
1989	Withdrew midseason					Dave Hancock
1990	8th	10	14	.417	Did not qualify	Don Sheppard
1991	3rd	15	7	.682	Won Semi-final (North Adelaide, 82–72); Lost Preliminary Final (Hobart, 74–61)	Don Sheppard
1992	1st	17	3	.850	Won Semi-final (Melbourne, 54–52); Won Grand Final (Dandenong, 58–54)	Tom Maher
1993	3rd	12	6	.667	Won Semi-final (Dandenong, 83–68); Won Preliminary Final (Adelaide, 68–66); Lost Grand Final (Sydney, 65–64)	Guy Molloy
1994	4th	12	6	.667	Won Semi-final (Sydney, 62–58); Lost Preliminary Final (Melbourne, 74–64)	Guy Molloy
1995	4th	12	6	.667	Lost Semi-final (Melbourne, 60–39)	Guy Molloy
1996	4th	11	7	.611	Won Qualifying Final (Brisbane, 95–62); Won Semi-final (Bulleen, 75–58); Lost Preliminary Final (Adelaide, 87–55)	Guy Molloy
1997	8th	5	13	.278	Did not qualify	Murray Treseder
1998	3rd	8	4	.667	Lost Semi-final (AIS, 84–70)	Murray Treseder
1998–99	2nd	14	7	.667	Lost Semi-final (AIS, 81–62); Won Preliminary Final (Adelaide, 67–46); Lost Grand Final (AIS, 88–79)	Murray Treseder
1999–00	4th	11	10	.524	Lost Semi-final (Bulleen, 61–60)	Murray Treseder
2000–01	7th	4	17	.190	Did not qualify	James Crawford
Perth Lynx
2001–02	7th	4	17	.190	Did not qualify	Rick Morcom
2002–03	7th	6	15	.286	Did not qualify	Rick Morcom
2003–04	8th	0	21	.000	Did not qualify	Murray Treseder
2004–05	8th	1	20	.048	Did not qualify	Craig Friday
2005–06	7th	4	17	.190	Did not qualify	Paul O'Brien
2006–07	7th	3	18	.143	Did not qualify	Paul O'Brien
2007–08	10th	5	19	.208	Did not qualify	Joe McKay
2008–09	9th	4	18	.182	Did not qualify	Joe McKay
2009–10	9th	2	20	.091	Did not qualify	Joe McKay / Vlad Alava
West Coast Waves
2010–11	8th	8	14	.364	Did not qualify	David Herbert
2011–12	9th	2	20	.091	Did not qualify	David Herbert
2012–13	9th	4	20	.167	Did not qualify	Kennedy Kereama
2013–14	9th	1	23	.042	Did not qualify	Kennedy Kereama
2014–15	8th	4	18	.182	Did not qualify	Kennedy Kereama
Perth Lynx
2015–16	2nd	16	8	.667	Won Semi-final (Townsville, 91–72); Lost Grand Final (Townsville, 0–2)	Andy Stewart
2016–17	3rd	15	9	.625	Lost Semi-final (Dandenong, 1–2)	Andy Stewart
2017–18	1st	15	6	.714	Lost Semi-final (Melbourne, 0–2)	Andy Stewart
2018–19	4th	13	8	.619	Lost Semi-final (Canberra, 0–2)	Andy Stewart
2019–20	5th	8	13	.381	Did not qualify	Andy Stewart
2020	7th	4	9	.308	Did not qualify	Ryan Petrik
2021–22	2nd	11	5	.688	Won Semi-final (Canberra, 91–77); Lost Grand Final (Melbourne, 1–2)	Ryan Petrik
2022–23	4th	13	8	.619	Lost Semi-final (Townsville, 0–2)	Ryan Petrik
2023–24	4th	11	10	.524	Won Semi-final (Townsville, 2–0); Lost Grand Final (Southside, 1–2)	Ryan Petrik
2024–25	2nd	16	5	.762	Lost Semi-final (Townsville, 0–2)	Ryan Petrik
2025–26	2nd	18	5	.783	Won Semi-final (Bendigo, 2–0); Lost Grand Final (Townsville, 0–2)	Ryan Petrik
Regular season		315	460	.406	2 Minor Premierships	
Finals		18	27	.400	1 WNBL Championship	

Source: Year By Year

== Arena history ==
- Superdrome / Challenge Stadium / Perth HPC (1988–1989; 2000–2001; 2024–present)
- Perry Lakes Basketball Stadium (1990–1992; 2000s)
- Perth Entertainment Centre (1993)
- Bendat Basketball Centre (2010–2025)

== Players ==
=== Current roster ===
Perth Lynx roster
Players
Coaches

Pos.	No.	Nat.	Name	Ht.
G	2	(Australia)	Gorman, Stephanie	1.83 m (6 ft 0 in)
F/C	3	(United States)	Morrell, Teige	1.91 m (6 ft 3 in)
G	5	(Australia)	Amoore, Georgia	1.68 m (5 ft 6 in)
G	6	(Australia)	Weir, Kyana (DP)	1.70 m (5 ft 7 in)
F	7	(United States)	Key, Teonni (I)	1.93 m (6 ft 4 in)
G	8	(Australia)	Ciabattoni, Alex (C)	1.80 m (5 ft 11 in)
G/F	10	(Australia)	Hodges, Chloe	1.83 m (6 ft 0 in)
F	12	(Australia)	Anticevic, Reece (AP)	1.86 m (6 ft 1 in)
F	15	(Australia)	Malone, Brooke (DP)	1.85 m (6 ft 1 in)
F	24	(Australia)	Maley, Anneli (C)	1.85 m (6 ft 1 in)
G	30	(Australia)	Ashby, Samantha	1.78 m (5 ft 10 in)
G	32	(Australia)	Whitcomb, Sami (injured)	1.78 m (5 ft 10 in)
F	33	(United States)	Peters, Haley (I)	1.91 m (6 ft 3 in)

Head coach

- (Australia) Ryan Petrik

Assistant coach(es)

- (Australia) Andrew Cooper
- (Australia) Marcus Embury
- (Australia) Carlin Hughes

Legend

- (C) Team captain
- (DP) Development player
- (I) Import player
- Injured

- Roster
Updated: 10 November 2026

=== Notable former players ===
- (United States) Ariel Atkins
- (Australia) Natasha Bargeus
- (Australia) Tully Bevilaqua
- (Australia) Rohanee Cox
- (New Zealand) Antonia Farnworth
- (United States) Betnijah Laney
- (Australia) Tessa Lavey
- (New Zealand) Angela Marino
- (Australia) Melissa Marsh
- (Australia) Fiona Robinson
- (United States) Asia Taylor
- (Australia) Michele Timms
- (Australia) Sami Whitcomb
- (United States) Courtney Williams
- (Australia) Carly Wilson
- (United States) Jackie Young

== Honour roll ==
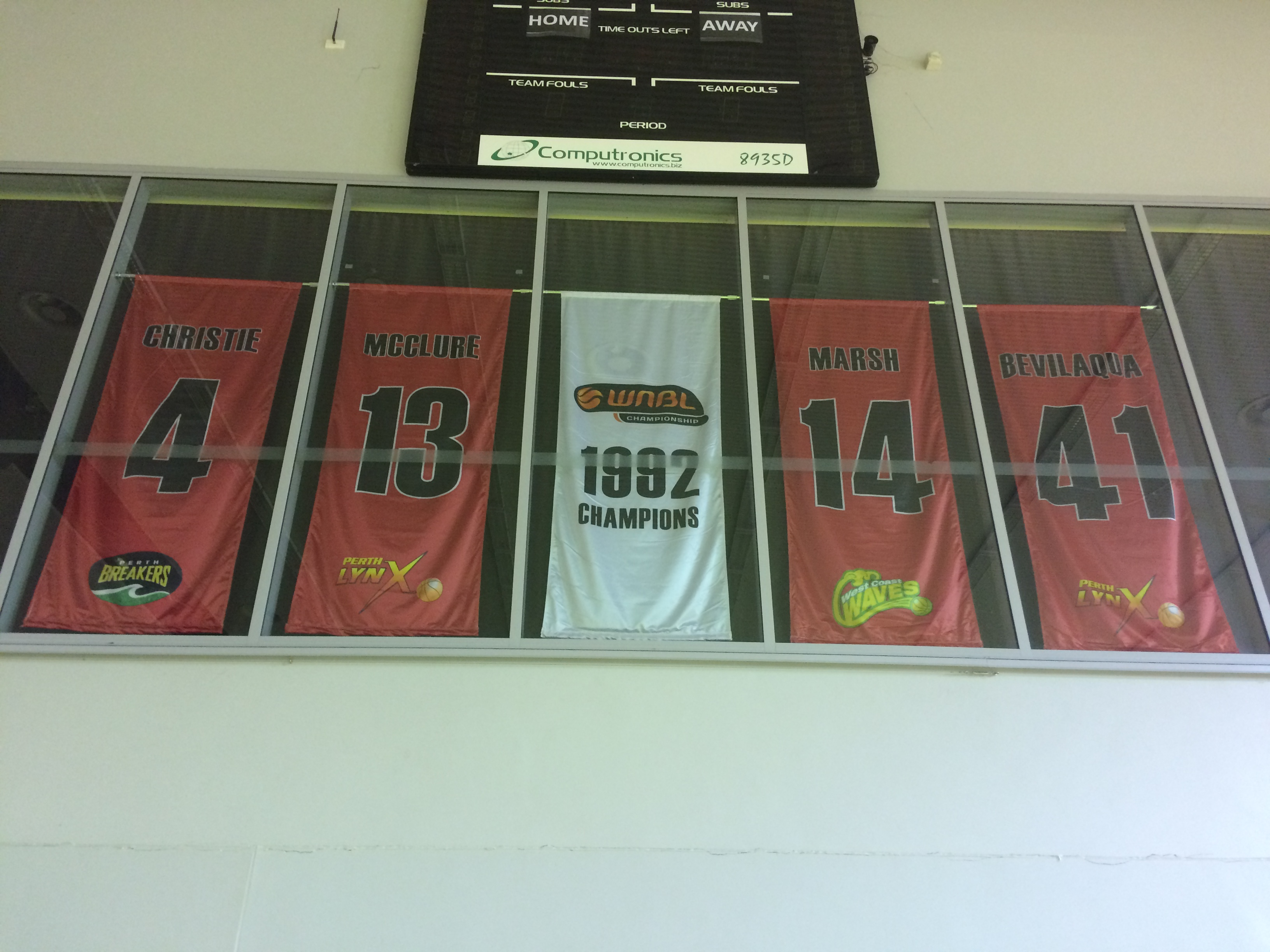
The Lynx's retired numbers and championship banner, on display at Bendat Basketball Centre in January 2018

WNBL Championships:	1 (1992)
WNBL Finals appearances:	18 (1991, 1992, 1993, 1994, 1995, 1996, 1998, 1999, 2000, 2016, 2017, 2018, 2019, 2022, 2023, 2024, 2025, 2026)
WNBL Grand Final appearances:	7 (1992, 1993, 1999, 2016, 2022, 2024, 2026)
WNBL Grand Final MVPs:	Tanya Fisher (1992)
All-WNBL First Team:	Michele Timms (1991, 1992, 1994), Gina Stevens (1996, 1999), Deanna Smith (2006, 2009), Carly Wilson (2007), Sami Whitcomb (2016, 2017, 2018, 2023), Courtney Williams (2018), Asia Taylor (2019), Katie-Rae Ebzery (2019–20, 2020), Jackie Young (2022), Alex Wilson (2025, 2026), Laeticia Amihere (2025), Anneli Maley (2026)
All-WNBL Second Team:	Marina Mabrey (2022), Lauren Scherf (2023), Aari McDonald (2024), Amy Atwell (2024), Miela Sowah (2025), Anneli Maley (2025), Alex Ciabattoni (2026), Han Xu (2026)
WNBL Coach of the Year:	Tom Maher (1992), Guy Molloy (1995), Andy Stewart (2016, 2018), Ryan Petrik (2022)
WNBL Defensive Player of the Year:	Robyn Maher (1992), Tully Bevilaqua (1995, 1996, 1997, 2000), Han Xu (2026)
WNBL Sixth Woman of the Year:	Alison Schwagmeyer (2019–20)
WNBL Leading Scorer:	Gina Stevens (1996), Deanna Smith (2006), Sami Whitcomb (2017), Asia Taylor (2019), Aari McDonald (2024)
Retired numbers:	4 – Tina Christie, 13 – Melissa McClure, 14 – Melissa Marsh, 41 – Tully Bevilaqua

Source: Perth Lynx Achievements
