= Bendigo Spirit =

- Leagues: WNBL
- Founded: 2007
- History: Bendigo Spirit; 2007–present
- Arena: Red Energy Arena
- Capacity: 2800
- Location: Bendigo, Victoria
- Team colors: Blue, yellow, white
- Main sponsor: TAC
- General manager: Daniel Jackson
- Head coach: Kennedy Kereama
- Ownership: Sports Entertainment Group
- Championships: 3 (2013, 2014, 2025)
- Website: wnbl.basketball/bendigo

The Bendigo Spirit are an Australian professional basketball team based in Bendigo, Victoria. The Spirit play in the Women's National Basketball League (WNBL) and play their home games at Red Energy Arena. The team debuted in the WNBL in 2007.

== History ==
The Bendigo Spirit were formed in 2007 and debuted in the Women's National Basketball League in the 2007–08 season. The inaugural team was coached by Bernie Harrower and was led by his daughter, Kristi Harrower.

The Spirit played in three straight WNBL Grand Finals between 2013 and 2015, winning back-to-back WNBL championships in 2012–13 and 2013–14. At the time, the team was led by Harrower, Gabrielle Richards, Kelly Wilson as well as imports Chelsea Aubry and the now naturalised, Kelsey Griffin.

The Spirit missed the playoffs every year between 2015–16 and 2023–24. In 2024–25, the Spirit returned to the playoffs and made the WNBL Grand Final behind league MVP, Sami Whitcomb. The Spirit went on to defeat the Townsville Fire 2–0 in the grand final series to win their third WNBL championship.

In July 2025, the Spirit unveiled a new logo with a rebranded colour scheme and identity.

== Season-by-season records ==
Season	Standings	Regular season			Finals	Head coach
Season	Standings	W	L	PCT	Finals	Head coach
Bendigo Spirit
2007–08	7th	10	14	41.6	Did not qualify	Bernie Harrower
2008–09	5th	14	8	63.6	Lost Elimination Final (Adelaide, 73–81)	Bernie Harrower
2009–10	5th	13	9	59.1	Lost Elimination Final (Townsville, 73–84)	Bernie Harrower
2010–11	3rd	15	7	68.2	Won Semi Final (Logan, 74–53); Lost Preliminary Final (Canberra, 78–83)	Bernie Harrower
2011–12	6th	12	10	54.5	Did not qualify	Bernie Harrower
2012–13	1st	21	3	87.5	Won Semi Final (Dandenong, 78–71); Won Grand Final (Townsville, 71–57)	Bernie Harrower
2013–14	1st	22	2	91.6	Won Semi Final (Dandenong, 71–62); Won Grand Final (Townsville, 94–83)	Bernie Harrower
2014–15	2nd	15	7	68.2	Lost Semi Final (Townsville, 63–82); Won Preliminary Final (Sydney, 85–77); Lost Grand Final (Townsville, 65–75)	Bernie Harrower
2015–16	6th	12	12	50.0	Did not qualify	Simon Pritchard
2016–17	6th	13	11	54.1	Did not qualify	Simon Pritchard
2017–18	8th	4	17	19.1	Did not qualify	Simon Pritchard
2018–19	7th	7	14	33.3	Did not qualify	Simon Pritchard
2019–20	7th	5	16	23.8	Did not qualify	Tracy York
2020	8th	0	13	0.0	Did not qualify	Tracy York
2021–22	5th	7	9	43.7	Did not qualify	Tracy York
2022–23	5th	11	10	52.3	Did not qualify	Tracy York
2023–24	6th	11	10	52.3	Did not qualify	Kennedy Kereama
2024-25	1st	18	3	85.7	Won Semi Final (Sydney, 76-67, 91-74) Won Grand Final (Townsville, 70-60, 63-55)	Kennedy Kereama
Regular season		210	172	52.7	3 Minor Premierships	
Finals		6	5	54.5	3 WNBL Championships	

Source: Bendigo Spirit

== Players ==
=== Current roster ===
Bendigo Spirit roster
Players
Coaches

Pos.	No.	Nat.	Name	Ht.
F	0	(Australia)	McDowell-White, Hayley (DP)	1.89 m (6 ft 2 in)
G	3	(Australia)	Booth, Georgia	1.75 m (5 ft 9 in)
G	4	(United States)	McConnell, Megan (I)	1.70 m (5 ft 7 in)
G	5	(Australia)	Simpson, Micah	1.70 m (5 ft 7 in)
F	7	(Australia)	Pollerd, Olivia	1.91 m (6 ft 3 in)
F	8	(Australia)	Macgregor, Catherine (DP)	1.80 m (5 ft 11 in)
C	12	(Australia)	Tolo, Marianna (C)	1.95 m (6 ft 5 in)
G	13	(Australia)	Wehrung, Abigail	1.78 m (5 ft 10 in)
G	14	(Australia)	Borlase, Isobel	1.80 m (5 ft 11 in)
G	16	(Australia)	Samuels, Casey	1.82 m (6 ft 0 in)
F	23	(Australia)	Griffin, Kelsey (C)	1.88 m (6 ft 2 in)
F	53	(Australia)	Rees, Kelsey	1.95 m (6 ft 5 in)

Head coach

- (New Zealand) Kennedy Kereama

Assistant coach(es)

- (Australia) Brayden Heslehurst
- (Australia) John White

Legend

- (C) Team captain
- (DP) Development player
- (I) Import player
- Injured

- Roster
Updated: 26 October 2025

=== Former players ===
- (Australia) Kathleen MacLeod, (2007–08)
- (Australia) Jenna O'Hea, (2007–08)
- (Australia) Kristi Harrower, (2008–2015)
- (Canada) Chelsea Aubry, (2009–2015)
- (Australia) Heather Oliver, (2010–2018)
- (United States) / (Australia) Kelsey Griffin, (2012–2018)
- (Australia) Sara Blicavs, (2013–2015)
- (Australia) Belinda Snell, (2014–2016)
- (United States) Betnijah Laney, (2017–18)
- (United States) Jennie Rintala
- (Australia) Carley Ernst
- (New Zealand) Chevannah Paalvast
- (Australia) Alicia Froling
- (Australia) Amelia Todhunter

== Coaches and staff ==
=== Head coaches ===
Bendigo Spirit head coaches
Name	Start	End	Seasons	Regular season				Finals			
Name	Start	End	Seasons	W	L	PCT	G	W	L	PCT	G
Bernie Harrower	2007	2015	8	121	61	66.4	182	6	5	54.5	11
Simon Pritchard	2015	2018	4	36	54	40.0	90	0	0	0.0	0
Tracy York	2019	2022	3	5	16	23.8	0	0	0	0.0	0
Kennedy Kereama	2022		1	7	0	100	0	0	0	0.0	0

== Ownership ==
In April 2022, the team's WNBL license was purchased from Bendigo Stadium Limited (BSL) by Sports Entertainment Group.
