= Townsville Fire =

Australian women's basketball team

- Leagues: WNBL
- Founded: 2001
- History: Townsville Fire; 2001–present
- Arena: Townsville Entertainment and Convention Centre
- Capacity: 5,257
- Location: Townsville, Queensland
- Main sponsor: James Cook University
- General manager: Sam Pascoe
- Head coach: Shannon Seebohm
- Championships: 5 (2015, 2016, 2018, 2023, 2026)

The Townsville Fire are an Australian professional basketball team competing in the Women's National Basketball League (WNBL). The Fire are based in Townsville, Queensland, and play their home games at Townsville Entertainment and Convention Centre.

The team was established in 2001. In 2014, James Cook University became the team's principal partner and naming rights sponsor.

The Fire are five-time WNBL champions, winning in 2015, 2016, 2018, 2023 and 2026.

== History ==
In May 2001, Townsville Basketball were granted a WNBL license for the 2001–02 season.

In 2011, the Fire were close to folding under the weight of financial pressures.

The Fire reached four straight WNBL Grand Finals between 2012–13 and 2015–16, winning back-to-back championships in 2015 and 2016. Their victory in March 2015 was the city's maiden national premiership. The Fire returned to the WNBL Grand Final in 2017–18 and won their third title in four years. The team won their fourth championship in 2023, and fifth championship in 2026.

== Season-by-season records ==
Season	Standings	Regular season			Finals	Head coach
Season	Standings	W	L	PCT	Finals	Head coach
Townsville Fire
2001–02	8th	3	18	14.2	Did not qualify	David Herbert
2002–03	2nd	15	6	71.0	Lost Semi Final (Canberra, 67–68); Lost Preliminary Final (Sydney, 78–83)	David Herbert
2003–04	5th	12	9	57.0	Did not qualify	David Herbert
2004–05	6th	7	14	33.0	Did not qualify	David Herbert
2005–06	6th	12	9	57.0	Did not qualify	David Herbert
2006–07	6th	10	11	48.0	Did not qualify	David Herbert
2007–08	6th	10	14	41.6	Did not qualify	Peter Buckle
2008–09	3rd	16	6	72.7	Won Semi Final (Adelaide, 91–78); Lost Preliminary Final (Bulleen, 68–79)	Peter Buckle
2009–10	4th	14	8	63.6	Won Elimination Final (Bendigo, 84–73); Lost Semi Final (Canberra, 39–60)	Peter Buckle
2010–11	7th	10	12	45.4	Did not qualify	Peter Buckle
2011–12	4th	13	9	59.0	Won Elimination Final (Sydney, 85–78); Lost Semi Final (Dandenong, 66–77)	Chris Lucas
2012–13	4th	13	11	54.1	Won Semi Final (Adelaide, 60–53); Won Preliminary Final (Dandenong, 78–64); Lost Grand Final (Bendigo, 57–71)	Chris Lucas
2013–14	3rd	16	8	66.6	Won Semi Final (Melbourne, 78–73); Won Preliminary Final (Dandenong, 74–71); Lost Grand Final (Bendigo, 83–94)	Chris Lucas
2014–15	1st	17	5	77.7	Won Semi Final (Bendigo, 82–63); Won Grand Final (Bendigo, 75–65)	Chris Lucas
2015–16	1st	17	7	70.8	Lost Semi Final (Perth, 72–91); Won Preliminary Final (South East Queensland, 91–71); Won Grand Final (Perth, 2–0)	Chris Lucas
2016–17	4th	14	10	58.3	Lost Semi Final (Sydney, 0–2)	Claudia Brassard
2017–18	3rd	14	7	66.6	Won Semi Final (Sydney, 2–0); Won Grand Final (Melbourne, 2–1)	Claudia Brassard
2018–19	6th	9	12	42.8	Did not qualify	Claudia Brassard
2019–20	8th	5	16	23.8	Did not qualify	Shannon Seebohm
2020	2nd	9	4	69.2	Lost Semi Final (Southside, 93–106); Won Preliminary Final (Melbourne, 65–62); Lost Grand Final (Southside, 82–99)	Shannon Seebohm
2021–22	6th	7	10	41.1	Did not qualify	Shannon Seebohm
2022–23	1st	17	4	80.9	Won Semi Final (Perth, 2-0) Won Grand Final (Southside, 2-0)	Shannon Seebohm
2023–24	1st	14	7	66.6	Loss Semi Final (Perth, 0-2)	Shannon Seebohm
Regular season		274	221	55.3	4 Minor Premierships	
Finals		19	15	55.8	4 WNBL Championships	

== Players ==
=== Current roster ===
2025–26 Townsville Fire roster
Players
Coaches

Pos.	No.	Nat.	Name	Ht.
F	0	(Australia)	Horvat, Chantel (IRP)	1.87 m (6 ft 2 in)
G	1	(Australia)	Sowah, Miela	1.80 m (5 ft 11 in)
G	2	(Australia)	Shiels, Saffron (injured)	1.88 m (6 ft 2 in)
G/F	7	(Australia)	Woods, Courtney (C)	1.83 m (6 ft 0 in)
F	9	(Australia)	Froling, Alicia (C)	1.90 m (6 ft 3 in)
G	11	(Australia)	Forster, Chloe	1.78 m (5 ft 10 in)
F	12	(Australia)	Fowler, Alexandra	1.88 m (6 ft 2 in)
F	15	(United States)	Cox, Lauren (I)	1.93 m (6 ft 4 in)
G/F	16	(Australia)	Crichton, Dakota	1.85 m (6 ft 1 in)
F	21	(Australia)	Anderson, Piper (DP)	1.87 m (6 ft 2 in)
G	23	(Australia)	Ellis, Abbey	1.68 m (5 ft 6 in)
F	25	(Australia)	Van Es, Caitlyn (DP)	1.90 m (6 ft 3 in)
F	33	(United States)	Olsen, Lucy (I)	1.78 m (5 ft 10 in)

Head coach

- (Australia) Shannon Seebohm

Assistant coach(es)

- (Australia) Miles Bench
- (Australia) Marcus Wong

Legend

- (C) Team captain
- (DP) Development player
- (I) Import player
- (IRP) Injury replacement player
- Injured

- Roster
Updated: 26 October 2025

=== Former players ===
- (Australia) Gina Stevens, (2002–2004)
- (Australia) Jodie Datson, (2002–05)
- (Australia) Natalie Porter, (2004–2006)
- (Australia) Rachael McCully, (2004–2007, 2008–2015)
- (Australia) Rohanee Cox, (2005–2010)
- (United States) Jennifer Crouse, (2005–2009)
- (Australia) Kelly Wilson, (2005–2008, 2016–2018)
- (New Zealand) Aneka Kerr, (2008–2010)
- (Australia) Jo Hill, (2009–2011)
- (Australia) Nadeen Payne, (2010–2012)
- (United States) Shanavia Dowdell, (2011–2012)
- (Australia) Jessica Foley, (2011–2013)
- (Australia) Suzy Batkovic, (2013–2019)
- (United States) Karlie Samuelson, (2022-2023)

== Coaches and staff ==
=== Owners ===
- Townsville Fire Limited (2011–present)

=== Head coaches ===
Townsville Fire head coaches
Name	Start	End	Seasons	Regular season				Finals			
Name	Start	End	Seasons	W	L	PCT	G	W	L	PCT	G
David Herbert	2001	2007	6	59	67	46.82	126	0	2	0.00	2
Peter Buckle	2007	2011	4	50	40	55.55	90	2	2	50.00	4
Chris Lucas	2011	2016	5	76	40	65.51	116	10	4	71.42	14
Claudia Brassard	2016	2019	3	37	29	56.06	66	4	3	57.14	7
Shannon Seebohm	2019	Current	4	14	20	41.17	34	1	2	33.33	3
