= Rohanee Cox =

Australian basketball player

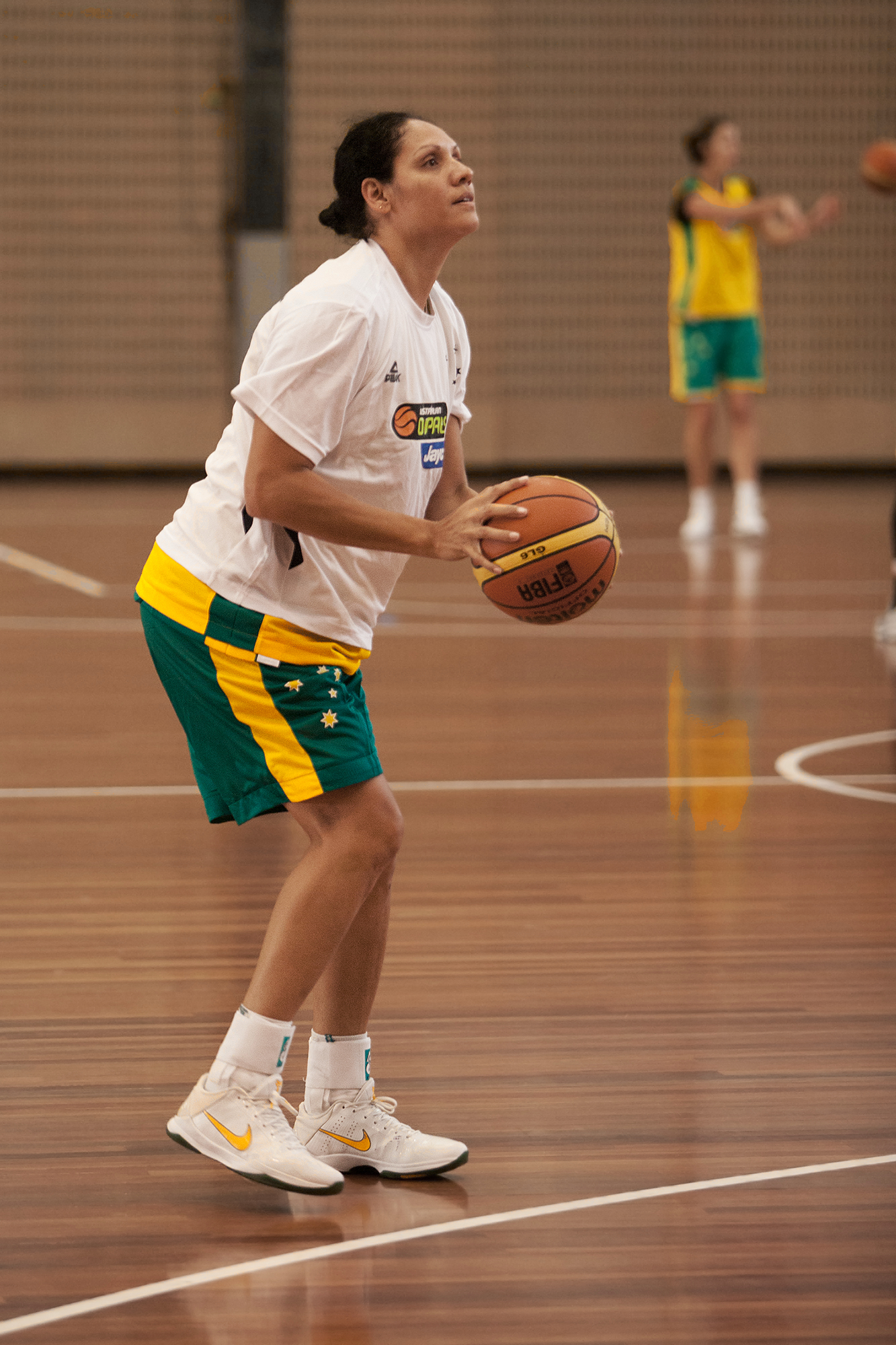
- Cox at a 2012 Opals training camp

Personal information
- Born: 23 April 1980 (age 46) Broome, Western Australia, Australia
- Listed height: 182 cm (6 ft 0 in)

Career information
- High school: Willetton Senior (Perth, Western Australia)
- Playing career: 1996–2016
- Position: Small forward / shooting guard

Career history
- 1996–1998: Australian Institute of Sport
- 1998–2000: Perth Lynx
- 2002–2003: Perth Lynx
- 2005–2010: Townsville Fire
- 2011–2012: West Coast Waves
- 2012–2016: Sydney Uni Flames

Career highlights
- WNBL MVP (2009); 2× WNBL All-Star Five (2008, 2009); ACC All-Star five (2007); 3× QBL All-League Team (2007, 2009, 2011); 3× SBL champion (1999, 2004, 2005); SBL MVP (2005); SBL Grand Final MVP (1999); SBL All-Star Five (2005); SBL Rookie of the Year (1998)
Medals
Representing Australia
Olympic Games
Silver medal – second place	2008 Beijing	Team competition

Rohanee "Roey" Cox (born 23 April 1980) is an Australian former professional basketball player. She was one of the first Aboriginal Australians to represent her country in basketball at the Olympics and won a silver medal with the Opals at the 2008 Summer Olympics.

She played in the Women's National Basketball League (WNBL) for the Australian Institute of Sport, Perth Lynx, Townsville Fire, West Coast Waves and Sydney Uni Flames. She has also played in the State Basketball League for the Willetton Tigers, and has spent time in the Queensland Basketball League with the Townsville Flames, Mackay Meteroettes and Cairns Dolphins.

== Early life ==
Cox, nicknamed Roey, was born on 23 April 1980 in Broome, Western Australia. She is an Indigenous Australian, and well-known in the Kimberley region of Western Australia.

When she was 20 years old, she was living in remote Western Australian town of One Arm Point, single and pregnant, and has a daughter named Alyriah. She has also encouraged her daughter to play basketball, signing her up for a local league.

== Physical characteristics ==
She is 183 centimetres (72 in) tall. The WNBL and Yahoo!Sport list her height as 182 centimetres (72 in). FIBA lists her height as 180 centimetres (71 in). On her back, she has a tattoo that means "last chance", which she had done in 2006.

== Basketball ==
Cox played a guard-forward role. She left the game for a while, but returned to basketball a year after the birth of her daughter. Her daughter inspired her to do as she wanted, so her daughter would understand what was possible. She said of this: "Just having her made me realise that I wanted her to have as much of an opportunity [in life] as I did. Just getting back into basketball has helped her get on her way and, more or less, helped me with my life and our lives together." She was also inspired to return by Cathy Freeman's performance at the 2000 Summer Olympics. She later took another year off from basketball in order to have her second child.

=== WNBL ===
Cox had a scholarship with and played for the Australian Institute of Sport in 1996, 1997 and 1998. She played for the Perth Lynx in 1999/2000, and 2002/2003.

In 2005/2006, she played for the Townsville Fire. She was with them again during the 2007/2008 season. In a January 2008 game against Bendigo, she scored 23 points in an 83–78 win for Townsville. She was named in the WNBL's All-Star Five this season. In 2008/2009, she was the WNBL MVP. She was the league's leading scorer that season. She played for the Townsville Fire again in 2009/2010, although she had to miss the first ten weeks of the season because of a knee injury. Cox played for the West Coast Waves in 2011/2012.

=== National team ===
Cox was one of the first Aboriginal Australians to represent her country in basketball at the Olympics. She earned 53 caps with Australia's junior national team. In 1995, she made her first international appearance with Australia's U/19 team at the FIBA World Championships. She played for them again in 1997, where Cox averaged 10.1 points per game, 3.9 rebounds per game and 1.2 assists per game, and her team took home a silver medal.

Cox made her Australian Opals debut as a teenager, however she left the team and sport shortly after that and did not play with the side again until 2006, eight years later. Getting back into the squad for 2008 was a challenge as she had to overcome a knee injury. She first played for the Opals in 1998 at the Brazil Olympic Committee Invitational and was named in the 1999 and 2000 squads.

In March 2007, Cox was named to the national team what would prepare for the 2008 Summer Olympics. She participated in the 2007 FIBA Oceania Championship for Women. She averaged 9.3 points per game and 4.3 rebounds per game and 3.0 assists per game. She participated in the 2008 FIBA Diamond Ball Tournament for Women. She averaged 6.3 points per game and 2.3 rebounds per game and 1.3 assists per game. At the 2008 Summer Olympics, she had had an Aboriginal flag and an Australian flag on her kit. Her parents and sister watched her play in Beijing. She won a silver medal at the 2008 Summer Olympics. She was the first Aboriginal Australian to win an Olympic medal in basketball. Her team won 7 straight games at the Olympics, only losing to the United States in the gold medal game. She averaged 5 points per game and 3 rebounds per game and 0.2 assists per game. At the time she won the medal, her daughter was seven years old.

Cox played in 2009 in a series against China which Australia won 2 games to 1. She was expected to step up for the third game. On 2 September 2009, she played in the Canberra-hosted return game against New Zealand in the Oceania Championship. Her team took a gold in the Oceania Championships. In the competition, she averaged 2 points per game, 1 rebound per game and 1 assist per game. She was a member of the national team again in 2001 and 2011. She was trying to make the Opals squad that will represent Australia at the 2012 Summer Olympics and participated in the national team training camp held from 14 to 18 May 2012 at the Australian Institute of Sport.

== Recognition ==
Cox has won several honours, including:

- 2007: Maher Medal for International Player of the Year
- 2008: Featured as a basketball star on myFiba
- 2009: Deadly Award for Female Sportsperson of the Year
- 2009: Featured in the WNBL's 2009 league calendar
- NAIDOC Sportsperson of the Year

In August 2021, Cox was inducted into the Basketball WA Hall of Fame. In November 2025, she was inducted into the Western Australian Hall of Champions.
