= Logan Thunder (WNBL) =

Basketball team from Australia

- Founded: 2008
- Dissolved: 2014
- History: Logan Thunder; 2008–2014
- Stadium: Logan Metro Sports Centre, Logan, Queensland, Australia
- Team colours: Home: Navy Blue & Marone; Away: White
- Head coach: Jason Chainey

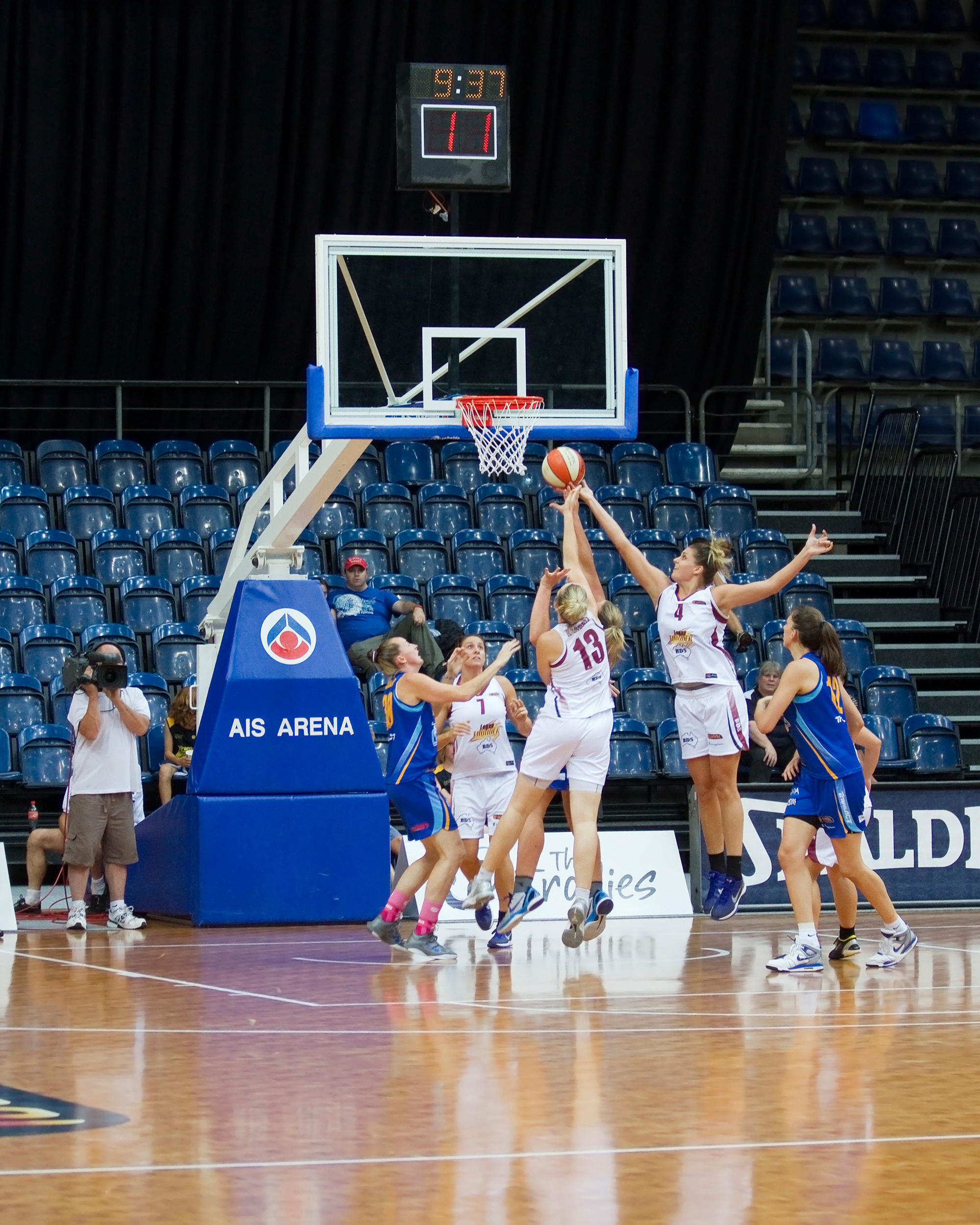
The Logan Thunder in white battle for the ball in a game against the Canberra Capitals on 20 January 2012

The Logan Thunder was an Australian professional women's basketball team competing in the Women's National Basketball League (WNBL). The team was based in Logan, Queensland.

== History ==
The Logan Thunder started in 2008 replacing New Zealand-based team Christchurch Sirens. They were the first team to represent South East Queensland in over 10 years. Thunder withdrew from the 2014/15 WNBL season due to financial difficulties and the team later folded.
