= WNBL Grand Final Most Valuable Player Award =

The Women's National Basketball League Grand Final Most Valuable Player (MVP) is an annual Women's National Basketball League (WNBL) award given to the best player of the Grand Final. Since 2014, the award has been known as the Rachael Sporn Medal, named after Adelaide's most recognised and successful WNBL player, Rachael Sporn, also a twice winner of the award. Lauren Jackson has won the award four times, while Kelsey Griffin has won the award three times.

== Winners ==
	Denotes player inducted into the Australian Basketball Hall of Fame
	Denotes player who is still active
Player (X)	Denotes the number of times the player had been named MVP at that time
Team (X)	Denotes the number of times a player from this team had won at that time

Season	Player	Position	Nationality	Team
1985	Karin Maar		Australia	Coburg Cougars
1986	Shelley Gorman		Australia	Nunawading Spectres
1987	Tracey Browning		Australia	Nunawading Spectres (2)
1988	Shelley Gorman (2)		Australia	Nunawading Spectres (3)
1989	Samantha Thornton		Australia	Nunawading Spectres (4)
1990	Donna Brown		Australia	North Adelaide Rockets
1991	Robyn Maher		Australia	Hobart Islanders
1992	Tanya Fisher		Australia	Perth Breakers
1993	Annie Burgess	Guard	Australia	Sydney Flames
1994	Rachael Sporn	Forward	Australia	Adelaide Lightning
1995	Rachael Sporn (2)	Forward	Australia	Adelaide Lightning (2)
1996	Michelle Griffiths	Forward	Australia	Adelaide Lightning (3)
1997	Trisha Fallon	Guard/forward	Australia	Sydney Flames (2)
1998	Jo Hill	Forward	Australia	Adelaide Lightning (4)
1999	Kristen Veal	Guard	Australia	Australian Institute of Sport
2000	Kristen Veal (2)	Guard	Australia	Canberra Capitals
2001	Annie Burgess (2)	Guard	Australia	Sydney Panthers (3)
2002	Lauren Jackson	Forward/center	Australia	Canberra Capitals (2)
2003	Lauren Jackson (2)	Forward/center	Australia	Canberra Capitals (3)
2004	Emily McInerny	Forward	Australia	Dandenong Rangers
2005	Jacinta Hamilton	Forward/center	Australia	Dandenong Rangers (2)
2006	Lauren Jackson (3)	Forward/center	Australia	Canberra Capitals (4)
2007	Tracey Beatty	Center	Australia	Canberra Capitals (5)
2008	Renae Camino	Guard	Australia	Adelaide Lightning (5)
2009	Natalie Hurst	Guard	Australia	Canberra Capitals (6)
2010	Lauren Jackson (4)	Forward/center	Australia	Canberra Capitals (7)
2011	Sharin Milner	Guard	Australia	Bulleen Boomers
2012	Kathleen MacLeod	Guard	Australia	Dandenong Rangers (3)
2013	Kelsey Griffin	Forward	United States	Bendigo Spirit
2014	Kelsey Griffin (2)	Forward	United States	Bendigo Spirit (2)
2015	Mia Newley	Guard	Australia	Townsville Fire
2016	Micaela Cocks	Guard	New Zealand	Townsville Fire (2)
2017	Leilani Mitchell	Guard	Australia	Sydney Uni Flames (4)
2018	Suzy Batkovic	Center	Australia	Townsville Fire (3)
2019	Kelsey Griffin (3)	Forward	Australia	Canberra Capitals (8)
2019–20	Olivia Époupa	Guard	France	Canberra Capitals (9)
2020	Leilani Mitchell (2)	Guard	Australia	Southside Flyers (4)
2022	Lindsay Allen	Guard	United States	Melbourne Boomers (2)
2023	Tianna Hawkins	Forward	United States	Townsville Fire (4)
2024	Mercedes Russell	Center	United States	Southside Flyers (5)
2025	Sami Whitcomb	Guard	Australia	Bendigo Spirit (3)
2026	Courtney Woods	Guard	Australia	Townsville Fire (5)

== Multi-time winners ==
Rank	Player	Team(s)	Awards	Years
1	Lauren Jackson	Canberra Capitals	4	2002, 2003, 2006, 2010
2	Kelsey Griffin	Bendigo Spirit (2) / Canberra Capitals (1)	3	2013, 2014, 2019
3	Shelley Gorman	Nunawading Spectres	2	1986, 1988
3	Rachael Sporn	Adelaide Lightning	2	1994, 1995
3	Kristen Veal	Australian Institute of Sport (1) / Canberra Capitals (1)	2	1999, 2000
3	Annie Burgess	Sydney Flames / Panthers	2	1993, 2001
3	Leilani Mitchell	Sydney Uni Flames (1) / Southside Flyers (1)	2	2017, 2020

== See also ==
- NBL Grand Final Most Valuable Player Award
