= 2024 WNBL Finals =

Women's National Basketball League Finals

Team	Coach	Wins
Southside Flyers	Cheryl Chambers	2
Perth Lynx	Ryan Petrik	1
- Dates: 28 February – 13 March
- Season: 2023–24
- Teams: 4
- MVP: Mercedes Russell (STH)
- Semifinalists: Townsville Fire; Melbourne Boomers
- Matches played: 8
- Attendance: 16,389 (2,049 per match)
- All statistics correct as of 17 March 2024.

The 2024 WNBL Finals is the postseason tournament of the WNBL's 2023–24 season. The Townsville Fire were the defending champions, but were defeated by Perth in the Semi-Finals. The WNBL Finals schedule was confirmed 25 February 2024, followed by the Grand Finals series schedule announced 6 March 2024.

== Overview ==
=== Finals appearances ===
- The Townsville Fire qualified for Finals for the second consecutive season and were back-to-back minor premiers.
- The Southside Flyers qualified for Finals for the second consecutive season.
- The Melbourne Boomers qualified for Finals for the seventh consecutive season, which is the longest active run of WNBL Finals appearances.
- The Perth Lynx qualified for Finals for the third consecutive season.
- The Sydney Flames missed Finals for the sixth consecutive season.
- The Bendigo Spirit missed Finals for the ninth consecutive season, currently the longest break between Finals appearances in the WNBL.
- The Adelaide Lightning missed Finals for the second consecutive season.
- The Canberra Capitals missed Finals for the second consecutive season.

=== Notable occurrences ===
- The same four teams that qualified for Finals in 2023, again qualified for the 2024 Finals. This marked the first occurrence of back-to-back appearances of the exact same teams since 2001–2002.

== Standings ==
#	2023–24 WNBL Championship ladder				
#	Team	W	L	PCT	GP
1	Townsville Fire	14	7	66.6	21
2	Southside Flyers	13	8	61.9	21
3	Melbourne Boomers	12	9	57.1	21
4	Perth Lynx	11	10	52.3	21
5	Sydney Flames	11	10	52.3	21
6	Bendigo Spirit	11	10	52.3	21
7	Adelaide Lightning	8	13	38.0	21
8	Canberra Capitals	4	17	19.0	21

== Bracket ==
Semi Finals
1	Townsville Fire	0
4	Perth Lynx	2
3	Melbourne Boomers	1
2	Southside Flyers	2

Grand Final
4	Perth Lynx	1
2	Southside Flyers	2

== Semi-Finals ==
=== (1) Townsville Fire vs. (4) Perth Lynx ===
29 February 2024
6:00 PM (AEST)

Box Score

Townsville Fire	87–88	Perth Lynx
Scoring by quarter: 27–25, 24–19, 14–27, 22–17
Pts: Whitcomb 24; Rebs: Aokuso 10; Asts: Reid 5		Pts: McDonald 26; Rebs: Potter 10; Asts: McDonald 9

Townsville Entertainment Centre, Townsville, Queensland
Attendance: 2,341
Referees: Scott Beker, Tayla Flint, Elliot Green

3 March 2024
12:30 PM (AWST)

Box Score

Perth Lynx	108–102	Townsville Fire
Scoring by quarter: 28–23, 28–21, 23–24, 29–34
Pts: Atwell, McDonald 27; Rebs: Potter 13; Asts: McDonald 11		Pts: Whitcomb 24; Rebs: Ruef 9 Asts: Reid 7
Perth win series, 2–0

Bendat Basketball Centre, Perth, Western Australia
Attendance: 1,275
Referees: Joshua Durand, Brad Henshaw, Jack Taylor

Regular season series
Townsville won 3–0 in the regular season series

25 November 2023

Box Score

Perth Lynx 76, Townsville Fire 92

Bendat Basketball Centre, Perth, Western Australia

31 December 2023

Box Score

Townsville Fire 87, Perth Lynx 64

Townsville Entertainment Centre, Townsville

3 January 2024

Box Score

Townsville Fire 104, Perth Lynx 91

Townsville Entertainment Centre, Townsville

=== (2) Southside Flyers vs. (3) Melbourne Boomers ===
28 February 2024
7:00 PM (AEDT)

Box Score

Southside Flyers	90–86	Melbourne Boomers
Scoring by quarter: 19–21, 25–26, 26–14, 20–25
Pts: Jackson 20; Rebs: Three players 8 Asts: Mitchell, Russell 5		Pts: Froling 23; Rebs: Froling, Hillmon 7 Asts: Canada 11

Melbourne Sports Centre Parkville, Melbourne, Victoria
Attendance: 890
Referees: Calia Hanks, Travis Stewart, Jack Taylor

2 March 2024
7:00 PM (AEDT)

Box Score

Melbourne Boomers	88–67	Southside Flyers
Scoring by quarter: 14–12, 21–17, 27–23, 26–15
Pts: Hillmon 22; Rebs: Conti, Hillmon 9 Asts: Canada 5		Pts: Jackson 21; Rebs: Jackson, Russell 6 Asts: Mitchell, Rocci 6

Melbourne Sports Centre Parkville, Melbourne, Victoria
Attendance: 2,892
Referees: James Boyer, Madison Crowley-Long, Jacqui Dover

6 March 2024
7:00 PM (AEDT)

Box Score

Southside Flyers	93–77	Melbourne Boomers
Scoring by quarter: 22–20, 25–21, 27–17, 19–19
Pts: Jackson 38; Rebs: Jackson 11; Asts: Rocci 6		Pts: Canada 18; Rebs: Hillmon 8 Asts: Canada 7
Southside win series, 2–1

Melbourne Sports Centre Parkville, Melbourne, Victoria
Attendance: 1,896
Referees: Calia Hanks, Travis Stewart, Jack Taylor

Regular season series
Melbourne won 2–1 in the regular season series

4 November 2023

Box Score

Southside Flyers 70, Melbourne Boomers 77

State Basketball Centre, Melbourne

3 January 2024

Box Score

Melbourne Boomers 67, Southside Flyers 61

Melbourne Sports Centre Parkville, Melbourne

21 January 2024

Box Score

Melbourne Boomers 82, Southside Flyers 84

Melbourne Sports Centre Parkville, Melbourne

== Grand Final ==
=== (2) Southside Flyers vs. (4) Perth Lynx ===
10 March 2024
3:30 PM (AEDT)

Box Score

Southside Flyers	79–101	Perth Lynx
Scoring by quarter: 16–26, 21–34, 16–22, 26–19
Pts: Jackson 21; Rebs: Rocci 9 Asts: Mitchell 6		Pts: Atwell 30; Rebs: Potter 10; Asts: McDonald 10

Melbourne Sports Centre Parkville, Melbourne, Victoria
Attendance: 2,356
Referees: Scott Beker, Calia Hanks, Jack Taylor

14 March 2024
6:30 PM (AWST)

Box Score

Perth Lynx	95–97	Southside Flyers
Scoring by quarter: 25–28, 18–27, 28–23, 24–19
Pts: McDonald 26; Rebs: Maley 17; Asts: McDonald 8		Pts: Dickey 19; Rebs: Russell 17; Asts: Rocci 6

Bendat Basketball Centre, Perth, Western Australia
Attendance: 1,753
Referees: Scott Beker, Tayla Flint, Jack Taylor

17 March 2024
1:30 PM (AEDT)

Box Score

Southside Flyers	115–81	Perth Lynx
Scoring by quarter: 28–27, 24–12, 33–26, 30–16
Pts: Dickey 19; Rebs: Russell 13; Asts: Mitchell 6		Pts: Atwell 22; Rebs: Maley 6 Asts: McDonald 3

Melbourne Sports Centre Parkville, Melbourne, Victoria
Attendance: 2,986
Referees: Scott Beker, Tayla Flint, Jack Taylor

Regular season series
Southside won 2–1 in the regular season series

22 November 2023

Box Score

Southside Flyers 94, Perth Lynx 92

State Basketball Centre, Melbourne

23 December 2023

Box Score

Perth Lynx 95, Southside Flyers 85

Bendat Basketball Centre, Perth

31 January 2024

Box Score

Southside Flyers 91, Perth Lynx 70

State Basketball Centre, Melbourne

=== Rosters ===
2023–24 Southside Flyers roster
Players
Coaches

Pos.	No.	Nat.	Name	Ht.
G	1	(Australia)	Cole, Rebecca (C)	1.78 m (5 ft 10 in)
F	4	(Australia)	Brown, Louise	1.90 m (6 ft 3 in)
G	5	(Australia)	Mitchell, Leilani	1.65 m (5 ft 5 in)
G	7	(Australia)	Loughridge, Dallas	1.67 m (5 ft 6 in)
G	9	(Australia)	Rocci, Maddison	1.68 m (5 ft 6 in)
F	11	(Australia)	Ernst, Carley	1.96 m (6 ft 5 in)
F	12	(Australia)	Wischer, Klara	1.90 m (6 ft 3 in)
F	13	(Australia)	Puoch, Nyadiew	1.86 m (6 ft 1 in)
F/C	15	(Australia)	Jackson, Lauren	1.96 m (6 ft 5 in)
G	20	(United States)	Dickey, Jasmine	1.75 m (5 ft 9 in)
C	21	(United States)	Russell, Mercedes	1.98 m (6 ft 6 in)

Head coach

- (Australia) Cheryl Chambers

Assistant coach(es)

- (Australia) Kerryn Mitchell
- (Australia) Hannah Lowe

Legend

- (C) Team captain
- (DP) Development player
- (I) Import player
- Injured

- Roster
Updated: 7 March 2024

2023–24 Perth Lynx roster
Players
Coaches

Pos.	No.	Nat.	Name	Ht.
G	1	(Australia)	Goodchild, Miela	1.80 m (5 ft 11 in)
G	2	(Australia)	Gorman, Stephanie	1.83 m (6 ft 0 in)
G	3	(United States)	McDonald, Aari	1.68 m (5 ft 6 in)
F/C	5	(Australia)	Hannan, Ashlee	1.92 m (6 ft 4 in)
G	6	(Australia)	Forster, Chloe	1.76 m (5 ft 9 in)
G	8	(Australia)	Ciabattoni, Alex	1.80 m (5 ft 11 in)
C	10	(Canada)	Potter, Emily	1.95 m (6 ft 5 in)
F	12	(Australia)	Clinch Hoycard, Mackenzie	1.91 m (6 ft 3 in)
F	24	(Australia)	Maley, Anneli (C)	1.85 m (6 ft 1 in)
G	25	(Australia)	Atwell, Amy	1.83 m (6 ft 0 in)

Head coach

- (Australia) Ryan Petrik

Assistant coach(es)

- (Australia) Natalie Burton
- (Australia) Brad Robbins

Legend

- (C) Team captain
- (DP) Development player
- (I) Import player
- Injured

- Roster
Updated: 7 March 2024
