= Andris Blicavs =

Australian basketball player

Personal information
- Born: 30 July 1954 (age 72) New Zealand

Sport
- Country: Australia
- Sport: Basketball

Andris Blicavs (born 30 July 1954) is an Australian retired basketball player.

== Biography ==
Blicavs was born in New Zealand to Latvian immigrant parents. He grew up in Adelaide and Melbourne. His sister Ilze also played the game at elite level.

Blicavs played for the Australia men's national basketball team during the 1970s. He competed for Australia at the 1974 World Championship in Puerto Rico and the 1978 World Championship in the Philippines. Blicavs also represented Australia at the 1976 Olympic Games in Montreal.

Blicavs is married to former Opals player Karen Ogden, who represented Australia at the 1983 World Championship held in Brazil. Their son Mark was drafted by the Geelong Football Club in 2012, while their daughter Sara has played basketball for the Australian Insitiute of Sport and Dandenong Rangers.

== See also ==
- Blicavs
