= Valerie Ogoke =

American basketball player

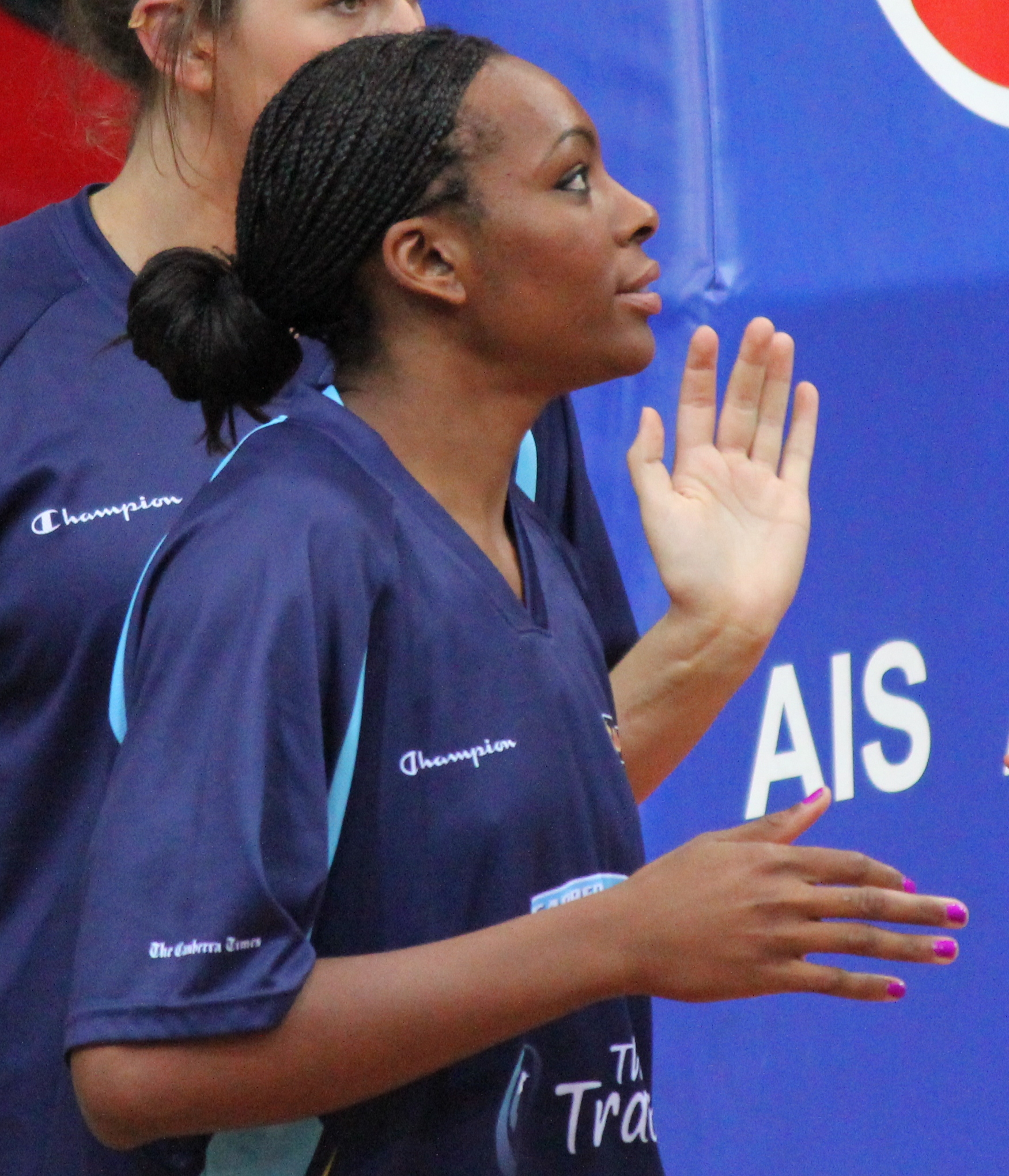
- Before a Canberra Capitals game

No. 20 – Canberra Capitals
- Position: Forward
- League: WNBL

Personal information
- Born: 10 September 1986 (age 40) Inglewood, California
- Listed height: 1.8 m (5 ft 11 in)

Career information
- College: Loyola Marymount (2004–2008)

Career highlights
- WCC All-Freshman Team (2005)

Valerie Ogoke (born 10 September 1986) is an American basketball forward playing professionally in Australia for the Canberra Capitals. She played high school basketball for St. Mary's Academy, before going on to play university basketball for Loyola Marymount University (LMU) from 2004 to 2008. While with the LMU team, she participated in a game in Australia against the Australian Institute of Sport team. After finishing university, where she majored in accounting, she played in the Western Australian State Basketball League for the South West Slammers. In 2012, following a three-week trial, she signed with the Canberra Capitals in Australia's Women's National Basketball League.

== Personal ==
Ogoke was born on 10 September 1986 in Inglewood, California. Her mother attended university in Nigeria, and Ogoke has two brothers and a sister. She is 1.8 metres (5 ft 11 in) tall. She graduated from St. Mary's Academy in 2004, and then attended Loyola Marymount University from 2004 to 2008, where she majored in accounting.

== Basketball ==
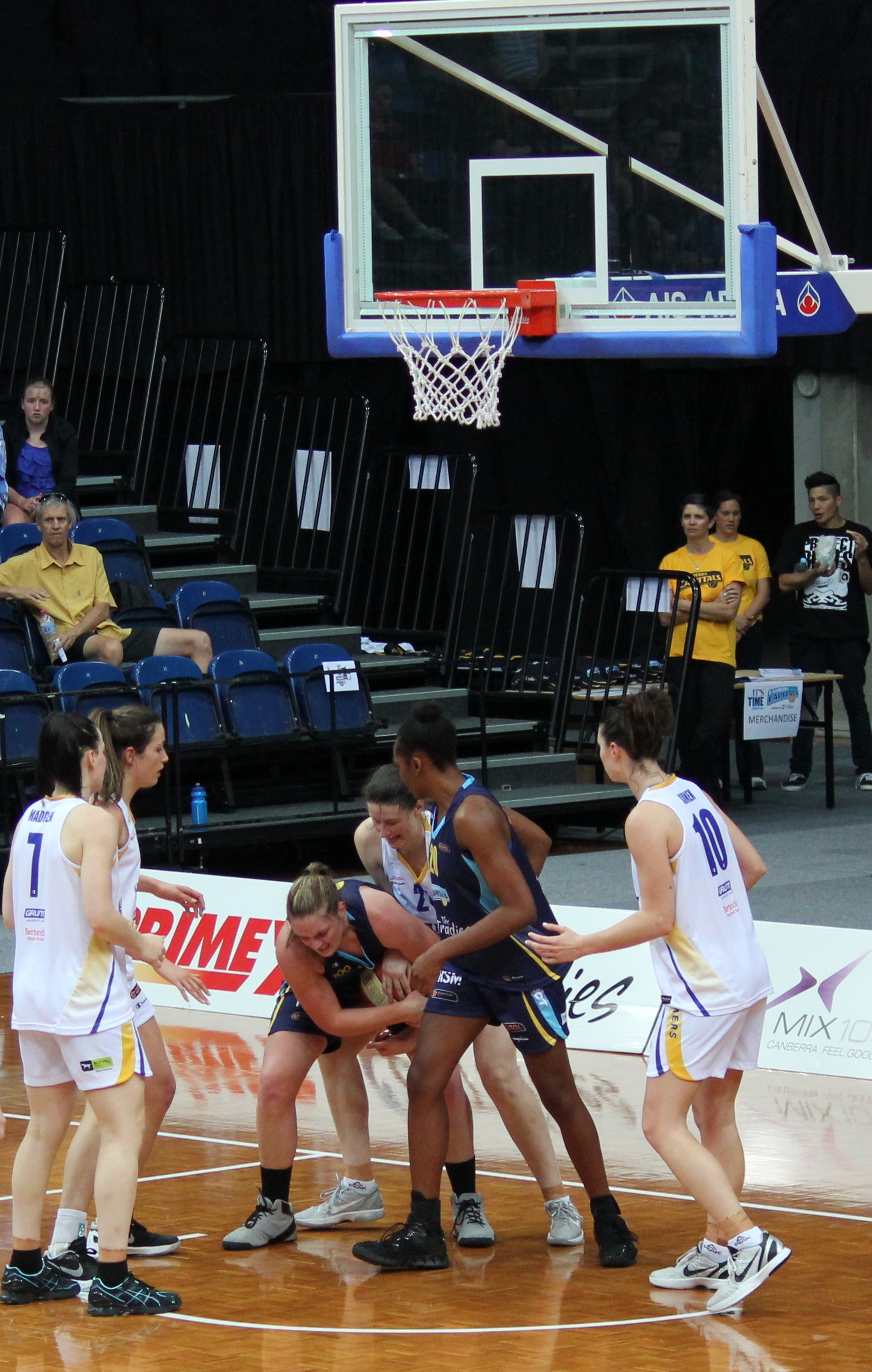
Ogoke watches other players tussle for the ball

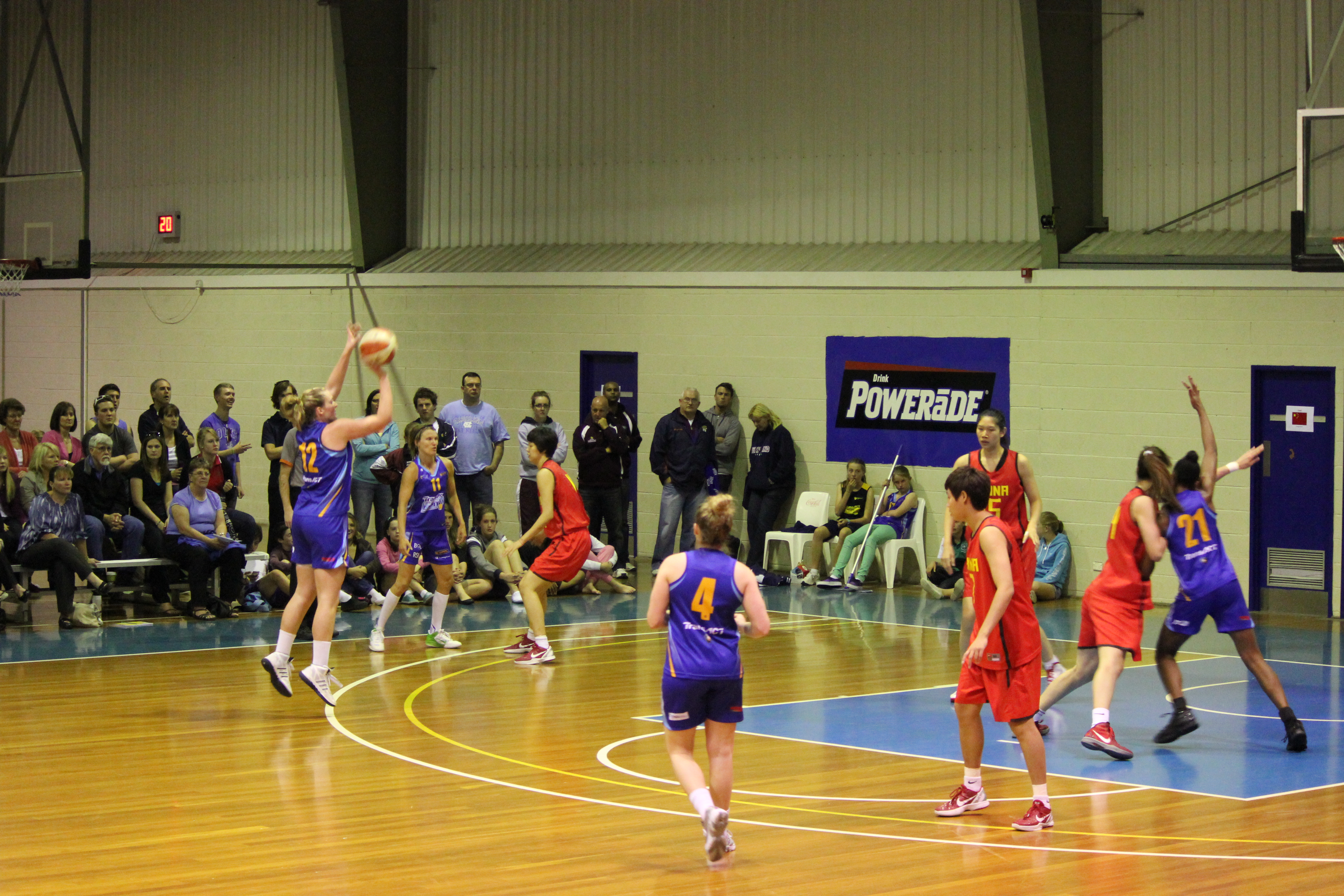
12 Samantha Norwood, 21 Val Ogoke, 4 Nicole Hunt and 11 Jessica Bibby in a game against China

Ogoke is a forward. She played varsity high school basketball for four years at St. Mary's Academy for four years, and was the team captain for three of those years. After completing university, Ogoke played in the Western Australian State Basketball League for the South West Slammers.

=== University ===
Ogoke was recruited by several university basketball programs including Princeton University, Dartmouth College, the University of California, San Diego, the University of Santa Clara and the University of Portland. She selected Loyola Marymount University (LMU) because of the academics, university location and sports program. She played for the team from 2004/2005 to 2007/2008. During the 2004/2005 season, she was named to the WCC's All-Freshman Team. She averaged 18.4 minutes, 5.4 points, 4.3 rebounds per game, and led the team in average offensive rebounds per game with 2.7. In an October 2004 game, she had her first university double double in a loss to Cal Poly. In May 2005, she traveled with her team to Australia, where they played against the Australian Institute of Sport (AIS) team. In the team's second game against the AIS with LMU, she scored 14 points and had 11 rebounds. In the 2005/2006 season, she was second on the team for total number of offensive rebounds with 67. She was also the team's leading blocker that season. In a February 2006 game against the University of Santa Clara, she scored 16 points and had 12 rebounds. In 2006/2007, she averaged 7.7 points and 7.1 rebounds per game. During her 2006/2007 season with the team, she averaged 7.8 points and 8.5 rebounds per game.

=== WNBL ===
Ogoke joined the Canberra Capitals for the 2012/13 season. The Canberra Times said she was crucial for the Capitals in terms of filling in until Lauren Jackson returned to the team. She signed to the team in September 2012 following a three-week trial. She was recruited to the team by David Herbert, the current Capitals assistant coach and former West Coast Waves head coach.

== Career statistics ==
Legend
GP	Games played	GS	Games started	MPG	Minutes per game	RPG	Rebounds per game
APG	Assists per game	SPG	Steals per game	BPG	Blocks per game	PPG	Points per game
TO	Turnovers per game	FG%	Field-goal percentage	3P%	3-point field-goal percentage	FT%	Free-throw percentage
**Bold**	Career best	°	League leader

=== College ===
Year	Team	GP	GS	MPG	FG%	3P%	FT%	RPG	APG	SPG	BPG	TO	PPG
2004–05	Loyola Marymount	29	-	18.1	45.0	0.0	51.3	4.3	0.6	0.9	0.8	**1.2**	5.3
2005–06	Loyola Marymount	29	-	20.9	45.1	0.0	**56.4**	5.6	0.5	**1.5**	1.1	1.7	7.6
2006–07	Loyola Marymount	**31**	-	24.2	42.1	0.0	51.4	5.6	**0.8**	1.0	1.3	1.9	7.0
2007–08	Loyola Marymount	30	-	**27.0**	**46.6**	0.0	40.2	**8.5**	**0.8**	**1.5**	**1.7**	1.8	**7.8**
**Career**		119	-	22.6	44.6	0.0	49.4	6.0	0.7	1.2	1.2	1.6	6.9
Statistics retrieved from Sports-Reference.
