= Blicavs =

Family name

Origin
- Region of origin: Latvia

Blicavs (pronounced Blitzavs) is a surname of Latvian descent, common to a well-known sporting family of Australia.

== People with the surname ==
- Andris Blicavs (born 1954), retired Australian basketball player
- Ilze Blicavs (m. Nagy), retired Australian basketball player
- Karen Ogden (m. Blicavs), retired Australian basketball player
- Mark Blicavs (born 1991), current Australian rules footballer
- Sara Blicavs (born 1993), current Australian basketball player
- Stephanie Blicavs (nee Cumming; born 1990), current Australian basketball player
