= 2023 WNBL Finals =

Australian women's basketball league finals

Team	Coach	Wins
Townsville Fire	Shannon Seebohm	2
Southside Flyers	Cheryl Chambers	0
- Dates: 8 – 22 March
- Season: 2022–23
- Teams: 4
- MVP: Tianna Hawkins (TSV)
- Semifinalists: Melbourne Boomers; Perth Lynx
- Matches played: 7
- Attendance: 16,949 (2,421 per match)
- All statistics correct as of 22 March 2023.

The 2023 WNBL Finals was the postseason tournament of the WNBL's 2022–23 season. The Melbourne Boomers were the defending champions, but were defeated in the Semi-Finals by Southside. The Townsville Fire won their fourth championship title after sweeping Southside, 2–0 in the Grand Final series.

The WNBL Finals schedule was confirmed 3 March 2023. In addition to domestic broadcast via ESPN and 9Now, the 2023 WNBL Finals will be broadcast internationally through new partnerships with ESPN, beIN Sports & Unbeaten.

== Overview ==
=== Finals appearances ===
- The Townsville Fire qualified for Finals for the first time since 2020.
- The Southside Flyers qualified for Finals for the first time since 2020.
- The Melbourne Boomers qualified for Finals for the sixth consecutive season, which is the longest active run of WNBL Finals appearances.
- The Perth Lynx qualified for Finals for the second consecutive season.
- The Bendigo Spirit missed Finals for the eighth consecutive season, currently the longest break between Finals appearances in the WNBL.
- The Sydney Flames missed Finals for the fifth consecutive season.
- The Adelaide Lightning missed Finals for the first time since 2020.
- The Canberra Capitals missed Finals for the first time since 2017–18.

== Standings ==
#	WNBL Championship ladder				
#	Team	W	L	PCT	GP
1	Townsville Fire	17	4	80.9	21
2	Southside Flyers	15	6	71.4	21
3	Melbourne Boomers	15	6	71.4	21
4	Perth Lynx	13	8	61.9	21
5	Bendigo Spirit	11	10	52.3	21
6	Sydney Flames	6	15	28.5	21
7	Adelaide Lightning	5	16	23.8	21
8	Canberra Capitals	2	19	5.8	21

== Bracket ==
Semi Finals
1	Townsville Fire	2
4	Perth Lynx	0
3	Melbourne Boomers	1
2	Southside Flyers	2

Grand Final
1	Townsville Fire	2
2	Southside Flyers	0

== Semi-Finals ==
=== (1) Townsville Fire vs. (4) Perth Lynx ===
9 March 2023
6:30 PM (AEST)

Box Score

Townsville Fire	81–68	Perth Lynx
Scoring by quarter: 21–19, 27–18, 16–20, 17–11
Pts: Reid 24; Rebs: Ruef 12; Asts: Reid, Ruef 3		Pts: Whitcomb 22; Rebs: Atwell, Bibby 9 Asts: Scherf, Whitcomb 5

Townsville Entertainment Centre, Townsville, Queensland
Attendance: 2,989
Referees: Tayla Flint, Byron Geddes, Jack Taylor

12 March 2023
3:30 PM (AWST)

Box Score

Perth Lynx	84–91	Townsville Fire
Scoring by quarter: 22–27, 21–26, 21–15, 20–23
Pts: Whitcomb 26; Rebs: Bibby 7 Asts: Whitcomb 7		Pts: Hawkins 23; Rebs: Hawkins, Ruef 8 Asts: Nicholson 7
Townsville win series, 2–0

Bendat Basketball Centre, Perth, Western Australia
Attendance: 1,212
Referees: Joshua Durand, Travis Stewart, Jack Taylor

=== (2) Southside Flyers vs. (3) Melbourne Boomers ===
8 March 2023
7:30 PM (AEDT)

Box Score

Southside Flyers	84–76	Melbourne Boomers
Scoring by quarter: 25–15, 22–20, 17-18, 20–23
Pts: Blicavs 18; Rebs: Thornton 7 Asts: M Rocci 7		Pts: T Mitchell 36; Rebs: George 14; Asts: Wallace 5

State Basketball Centre, Melbourne, Victoria
Attendance: 1,623
Referees: Craig Copes, Elliot Green, Calia Hanks

11 March 2023
7:30 PM (AEDT)

Box Score

Melbourne Boomers	96–77	Southside Flyers
Scoring by quarter: 27–13, 25–23, 28–23, 16–18
Pts: George 28; Rebs: Nelson-Ododa 8 Asts: Wallace 6		Pts: Blicavs 15; Rebs: M Rocci 9 Asts: M Rocci 8

Melbourne Sports Centre Parkville, Melbourne, Victoria
Attendance: 2,477
Referees: Madi Crowley-Long, Tayla Flint, Brad Henshaw

15 March 2023
7:30 PM (AEDT)

Box Score

Southside Flyers	73–72	Melbourne Boomers
Scoring by quarter: 16–15, 22–17, 18–19, 17–21
Pts: Blicavs, M Rocci 14; Rebs: Bishop 12; Asts: M Rocci 6		Pts: T Mitchell 23; Rebs: George 13; Asts: George, Wallace 3
Southside win series, 2–1

State Basketball Centre, Melbourne, Victoria
Attendance: 1,815
Referees: Byron Geddes, Elliot Green, Calia Hanks

== Grand Final ==
=== (1) Townsville Fire vs. (2) Southside Flyers ===
18 March 2023
7:00 PM (AEST)

Box Score

Townsville Fire	94–63	Southside Flyers
Scoring by quarter: 28–14, 29–24, 21–14, 16–11
Pts: Heal 23; Rebs: Ruef 9 Asts: Reid 7		Pts: Cole 20; Rebs: Blicavs 6 Asts: M Rocci 4

Townsville Entertainment Centre, Townsville, Queensland
Attendance: 3,717
Referees: Tayla Flint, Byron Geddes, Jack Taylor

22 March 2023
6:30 PM (AEDT)

Box Score

Southside Flyers	69–82	Townsville Fire
Scoring by quarter: 18–24, 21–17, 17–16, 13–25
Pts: Cole 26; Rebs: Thornton 8 Asts: Bishop 4		Pts: Reid 20; Rebs: Ruef 13; Asts: Reid, Ruef 4
Townsville win series, 2–0

State Basketball Centre, Melbourne, Victoria
Attendance: 3,116
Referees: Tayla Flint, Calia Hanks, Jack Taylor

=== Rosters ===
2022–23 Townsville Fire roster
Players
Coaches

Pos.	No.	Nat.	Name	Ht.
G	1	(Australia)	Nicholson, Lauren	1.80 m (5 ft 11 in)
G	3	(Australia)	Reid, Stephanie	1.68 m (5 ft 6 in)
G	4	(New Zealand)	Leger-Walker, Krystal	1.75 m (5 ft 9 in)
G/F	7	(Australia)	Woods, Courtney	1.83 m (6 ft 0 in)
G	9	(Australia)	Heal, Shyla	1.67 m (5 ft 6 in)
G	12	(Australia)	Gaze, Kate	1.73 m (5 ft 8 in)
F/C	14	(Australia)	McSpadden, Lara	1.94 m (6 ft 4 in)
C	15	(Australia)	Aokuso, Zitina	1.94 m (6 ft 4 in)
F	21	(United States)	Hawkins, Tianna	1.91 m (6 ft 3 in)
F	33	(United States)	Ruef, Mikaela	1.91 m (6 ft 3 in)
G/F	35	(Australia)	Parker-Williams, Nes'eya	1.88 m (6 ft 2 in)
G	44	(United Kingdom)	Samuelson, Karlie	1.83 m (6 ft 0 in)

Head coach

- (Australia) Shannon Seebohm

Assistant coach(es)

- (Australia) Marcus Wong
- (Australia) Hayden Zasadny

Legend

- (C) Team captain
- (DP) Development player
- (I) Import player
- Injured

- Roster
Updated: 22 March 2023

2022–23 Southside Flyers roster
Players
Coaches

Pos.	No.	Nat.	Name	Ht.
G	1	(Australia)	Cole, Rebecca	1.78 m (5 ft 10 in)
F	5	(Australia)	Pineau, Georgia	1.85 m (6 ft 1 in)
F	6	(United States)	Thornton, Kayla	1.85 m (6 ft 1 in)
G	9	(Australia)	Rocci, Maddison	1.68 m (5 ft 6 in)
F/C	10	(Australia)	Bishop, Abby	1.89 m (6 ft 2 in)
F	11	(Australia)	Ernst, Carley	1.96 m (6 ft 5 in)
F/C	12	(Australia)	Griffiths, Holly	1.90 m (6 ft 3 in)
F	13	(Australia)	Puoch, Nyadiew	1.86 m (6 ft 1 in)
G	14	(Australia)	Conti, Monique	1.65 m (5 ft 5 in)
F	15	(Australia)	Blicavs, Sara	1.89 m (6 ft 2 in)

Head coach

- (Australia) Cheryl Chambers

Assistant coach(es)

- (Australia) Kerryn Mitchell
- (Australia) Hannah Lowe

Legend

- (C) Team captain
- (DP) Development player
- (I) Import player
- Injured

- Roster
Updated: 22 March 2023
