= Mark Blicavs =

Australian rules footballer

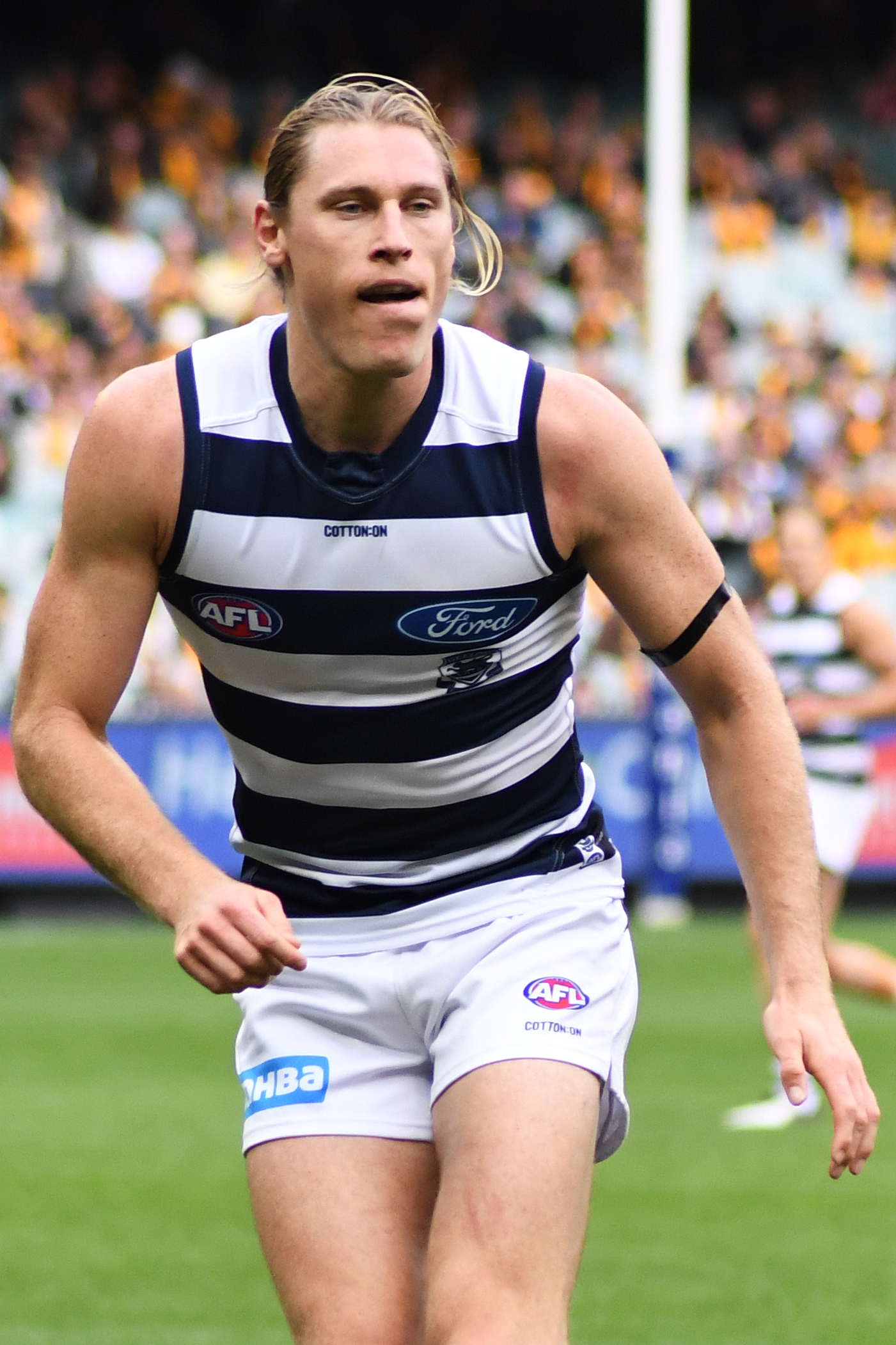
- Blicavs playing for Geelong in April 2019

Personal information
- Born: 28 March 1991 (age 35)
- Original team: Taylors Lakes (EDFL)
- Draft: No. 54, 2012 rookie draft
- Height: 198 cm (6 ft 6 in)
- Weight: 100 kg (220 lb)
- Position: Utility

Club information
- Current club: Geelong
- Number: 46

Playing career^{1}
Years	Club	Games (Goals)
2013–	Geelong	315 (85)

Representative team honours
Years	Team	Games (Goals)
2020	Victoria	1 (0)
- ^{1} Playing statistics correct to the end of 2026.

Career highlights
- AFL premiership player: (2022); All-Australian: (2022); 2× Carji Greeves Medal: (2015, 2018); Geelong best young player: 2013; 3x Geelong Best Clubman award: 2020, 2025, 2026

Mark Blicavs (/ˈblɪtsɑːvz/ BLIT-sahvz; born 28 March 1991) is a professional Australian rules footballer for the Geelong Football Club in the Australian Football League (AFL). He made his debut for the club in round one of the 2013 AFL season. He is considered to be one of the most versatile players in AFL history.

== Early life ==
Blicavs' parents were both born overseas – his father was born in New Zealand to Latvian parents, and his mother was born on the isle of Jersey. Both of his parents represented Australia at basketball. His father Andris Blicavs played at the 1976 Montreal Olympics and his mother Karen Ogden was a member of the team that competed at the 1983 World Championships. His brother Kris has played basketball in the South East Australian Basketball League (SEABL) and his sister Sara Blicavs played in the Women's National Basketball League (WNBL).

Prior to being recruited by Geelong, Blicavs was a middle-distance runner and steeplechaser, who attempted to qualify for the 2012 Summer Olympics.

== Football career ==
He made his debut in Round 1, 2013, against Hawthorn at the Melbourne Cricket Ground. In 2015, Blicavs won the Carji Greeves Medal as Geelong's best and fairest player.

== Statistics ==
Updated to the end of round 22, 2026.

Legend
G	Goals	K	Kicks	D	Disposals	T	Tackles
B	Behinds	H	Handballs	M	Marks	H/O	Hit-outs

Season	Team	No.	Games	Totals								Averages (per game)								Votes
Season	Team	No.	Games	G	B	K	H	D	M	T	H/O	G	B	K	H	D	M	T	H/O	Votes
2013	Geelong	46	22	7	8	96	143	239	63	69	238	0.3	0.4	4.4	6.5	10.9	2.9	3.1	10.8	0
2014	Geelong	46	23	5	4	142	135	277	92	76	197	0.2	0.2	6.2	5.9	12.0	4.0	3.3	8.6	0
2015	Geelong	46	21	4	6	156	226	382	96	126	343	0.2	0.3	7.4	10.8	18.2	4.6	6.0	16.3	4
2016	Geelong	46	24	7	7	170	257	427	100	139	195	0.3	0.3	7.1	10.7	17.8	4.2	5.8	8.1	1
2017	Geelong	46	20	12	5	148	176	324	82	102	121	0.6	0.3	7.4	8.8	16.2	4.1	5.1	6.1	1
2018	Geelong	46	23	1	3	153	182	335	91	76	79	0.0	0.1	6.7	7.9	14.6	4.0	3.3	3.4	0
2019	Geelong	46	25	0	3	182	154	336	124	90	91	0.0	0.1	7.3	6.2	13.4	5.0	3.6	3.6	0
2020 (Note: The 2020 season was played with 17 home-and-away matches per team (down from 22) and 16-minute quarters with time on (down from 20-minute quarters with time on) due to the impact of the COVID-19 pandemic.)	Geelong	46	21	3	1	132	132	264	70	59	180	0.1	0.0	6.3	6.3	12.6	3.3	2.8	8.6	0
2021	Geelong	46	24	5	0	164	166	330	94	67	283	0.2	0.0	6.8	6.9	13.8	3.9	2.8	11.8	0
2022^{#}	Geelong	46	24	8	5	186	239	425	97	121	350	0.3	0.2	7.8	10.0	17.7	4.0	5.0	14.6	9
2023	Geelong	46	19	12	7	154	147	301	65	88	202	0.6	0.4	8.1	7.7	15.8	3.4	4.6	10.6	3
2024	Geelong	46	24	5	7	162	179	341	77	86	230	0.2	0.3	6.8	7.5	14.2	3.2	3.6	9.6	0
2025	Geelong	46	25	11	9	157	198	355	96	80	341	0.4	0.4	6.3	7.9	14.2	3.8	3.2	13.6	3
2026	Geelong	46	17	2	5	93	134	227	45	47	167	0.1	0.3	5.5	7.9	13.4	2.6	2.8	9.8	0
Career			312	82	70	2095	2468	4563	1192	1226	3017	0.3	0.2	6.7	7.9	14.6	3.8	3.9	9.7	21

== Honours and achievements ==
Team

- AFL premiership player (Geelong): 2022
- 2× McClelland Trophy (Geelong): 2019, 2022

Individual

- 2× Carji Greeves Medal: 2015, 2018
- All-Australian team: 2022
- Victorian Representative Honours in Bushfire Relief Match: 2020
- Geelong F.C. Best Young Player Award: 2013
- Geelong F.C. Tom Harley Award for Best Clubman: 2020

== See also ==
- Blicavs
