= Karen Ogden =

Australian basketball player

Karen Blicavs
Personal information
- Born: Jersey

Sport
- Country: Australia
- Sport: Basketball

Karen Blicavs (maiden name: Ogden) is a former Australian women's basketball player.

== Biography ==
Blicavs was born on the isle of Jersey. She played for the Australia women's national basketball team during the 1980s and competed for Australia at the 1983 World Championship held in Brazil. Blicavs was selected to play for Australia at the 1984 Olympic Games held in Los Angeles before a knee injury forced her to withdraw from the team.

In the domestic competition, Blicavs played 130 games for Melbourne East and St Kilda Saints and was the Women's National Basketball League (WNBL) Most Valuable Player on two occasions; 1982 and 1983. Blicavs was also a key member of the St Kilda team that became the inaugural winner of the newly formed WNBL competition in 1981. In 1982, Blicavs led the WNBL in points scored with 410 at an average of 24.1 per game.

Blicavs is married to former Boomer player Andris Blicavs, who represented Australia at the 1976 Olympic Games held in Montreal, Quebec, Canada. Their son, Mark Blicavs was drafted by the Geelong Football Club in 2012, while their daughter, Sara Blicavs has played basketball for the Australian Insitiute of Sport and Dandenong Rangers.

== See also ==
- WNBL Top Shooter Award
- Blicavs
