= 1999–2000 WNBL season =

- League: Women's National Basketball League
- Sport: Basketball
- Duration: October 1999 – February 2000
- Number of teams: 8
- TV partner(s): ABC

Regular season
- Top seed: Canberra Capitals
- Season MVP: Lauren Jackson (Canberra Capitals); Trisha Fallon (Sydney Flames)
- Top scorer: Trisha Fallon (Sydney Flames)

Finals
- Champions: Canberra Capitals
- Runners-up: Adelaide Lightning
- Finals MVP: Kristen Veal (Canberra Capitals)

WNBL seasons
- ← 1998–99 2000–01 →

The 1999–2000 WNBL season was the 20th season of competition since its establishment in 1981. A total of 8 teams contested the league.

== Team standings ==
#	WNBL Championship Ladder				
#	Team	W	L	PCT	GP
1	Canberra Capitals	16	5	76.0	21
2	Adelaide Lightning	13	8	62.0	21
3	Bulleen Boomers	11	10	52.0	21
4	Perth Breakers	11	10	52.0	21
5	Dandenong Rangers	11	10	52.0	21
6	Sydney Flames	10	11	48.0	21
7	Melbourne Tigers	10	11	48.0	21
8	AIS	2	19	10.00	21

== Finals ==
Semifinals
Canberra Capitals	84
Adelaide Lightning	91
Bulleen Boomers	61
Perth Lynx	60

Preliminary final
Canberra Capitals	80
Bulleen Boomers	66

Grand final
Adelaide Lightning	50
Canberra Capitals	67

== Season award winners ==
Award	Winner	Team
Most Valuable Player Award	Lauren Jackson; Trisha Fallon	Canberra Capitals; Sydney Flames
Grand Final MVP Award	Kristen Veal	Canberra Capitals
Rookie of the Year Award	Shelley Hammonds	AIS
Defensive Player of the Year Award	Tully Bevilaqua	Perth Breakers
Coach of the Year Award	Mark Wright	Dandenong Rangers
Top Shooter Award	Trisha Fallon	Sydney Flames

== Statistics leaders ==
Category	Player	Team	GP	Totals	Average
Points Per Game	Trisha Fallon	Sydney Flames	21	434	20.7
Rebounds Per Game	Kristin Folkl	Melbourne Tigers	21	205	9.8
Assists Per Game	Kristen Veal; Kristi Harrower	Canberra Capitals; Melbourne Tigers	21	102	4.9
Steals Per Game	Tully Bevilaqua	Perth Breakers	21	60	2.4
Blocks per game	Kristin Folkl	Melbourne Tigers	21	40	1.9
Field Goal %	Kristin Folkl	Melbourne Tigers	21	(149/262)	56.9%
Three-Point Field Goal %	Jae Kingi-Cross	Adelaide Lightning	21	(24/63)	38.1%
Free Throw %	Shelley Sandie	Canberra Capitals	21	(59/67)	88.1%
