= Alice Coddington =

Australian basketball player

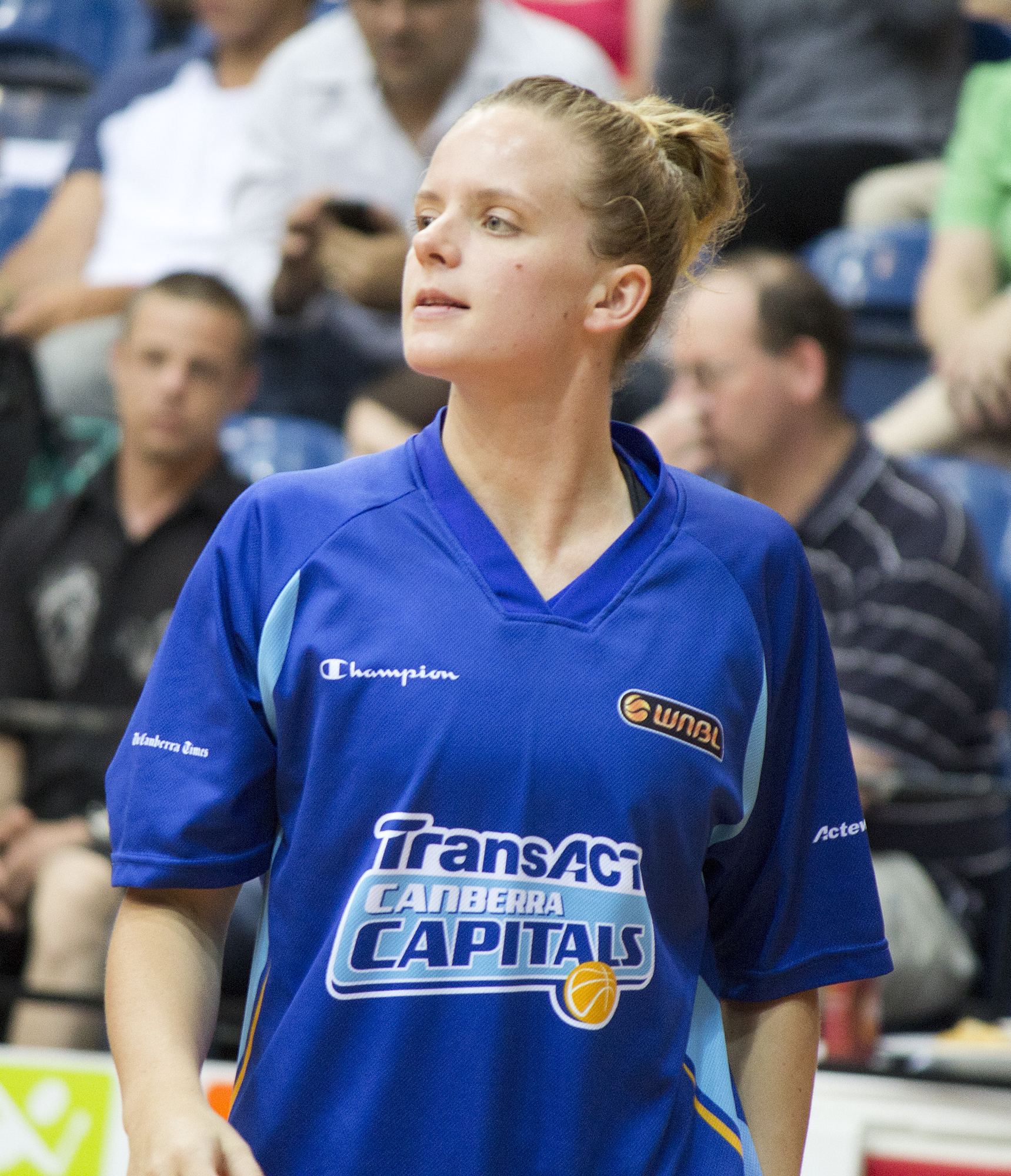
- Coddington during a game between the Capitals and Logan Thunder at AIS Arena

No. 7 – Canberra Capitals
- Position: Guard
- League: WNBL

Personal information
- Born: 24 October 1988 (age 38) Canberra, ACT, Australia
- Listed height: 1.78 m (5 ft 10 in)

Career information
- College: Utah State (2007–2011)
- Playing career: 2011–present

Alice Clare Coddington (born 24 October 1988) is an Australian basketball player. She played at the junior level in the Australian Capital Territory at Radford College, played college basketball in the United States at Utah State, and currently plays for the Canberra Capitals in Australia's Women's National Basketball League (WNBL). She has represented Australia on the U-19 "Gems" team.

== Personal ==
Coddington was born on 24 October 1988 in Canberra, Australia. She attended Radford College in the Australian Capital Territory. She is 178 centimetres (70 in) tall. While attending Utah State, she worked on earning a degree in marketing.

== Basketball ==
Coddington wears the number 7 when playing and is a guard.

=== Junior basketball ===
Coddington played her junior basketball in the Australian Capital Territory. In 2006, she was named the ACT Junior Female Basketball Player of the Year. She competed in the U-20 Australian National Championships, where she was the tournament's leading scorer. As a junior player, she was on the roster for a game for the Canberra Capitals against a Japanese touring team, which included four members of Japan's national team.

=== Radford College ===
In 2006, Coddington was the captain of Radford College's basketball team.

=== Utah State ===
Coddington played collegiate basketball in the United States for Utah State, where she was a "stand out player." She wore number 13 for the team. During the 2008/2009 and 2009/2010 seasons, she started every game for the team. As a member of the team, she earned several honours including being named to the 2010 Western Athletic Conference All-WAC Defensive Team, and to the 2008, 2009 and 2010 Academic All-WAC.

=== Utah State statistics ===
Ratios
| Year | Team | GP | FG% | 3P% | FT% | RBG | APG | BPG | SPG | PPG |
|---|---|---|---|---|---|---|---|---|---|---|
| 2007-08 | Utah State | 28 | 26.4% | 20.0% | 41.2% | 1.93 | 0.82 | 0.04 | 0.96 | 2.50 |
| 2008-09 | Utah State | 31 | 33.0% | 22.6% | 71.4% | 4.87 | 2.74 | 0.10 | 1.65 | 5.07 |
| 2009-10 | Utah State | 30 | 35.7% | 31.3% | 66.1% | 3.70 | 2.93 | 0.33 | 2.50 | 8.27 |
| 2010-11 | Utah State | 33 | 38.9% | 31.0% | 70.2% | 3.67 | 4.18 | 0.30 | 2.52 | 7.12 |
| Career | | 122 | 34.6% | 27.2% | 66.7% | 3.58 | 2.74 | 0.20 | 1.93 | 5.82 |

Totals
| Year | Team | GP | FG | FGA | 3P | 3PA | FT | FTA | REB | A | BK | ST | PTS |
|---|---|---|---|---|---|---|---|---|---|---|---|---|---|
| 2007-08 | Utah State | 28 | 28 | 106 | 7 | 35 | 7 | 17 | 54 | 23 | 1 | 27 | 70 |
| 2008-09 | Utah State | 31 | 60 | 182 | 12 | 53 | 25 | 35 | 151 | 85 | 3 | 51 | 157 |
| 2009-10 | Utah State | 30 | 94 | 263 | 21 | 67 | 39 | 59 | 111 | 88 | 10 | 75 | 248 |
| 2010-11 | Utah State | 33 | 79 | 203 | 18 | 58 | 59 | 84 | 121 | 138 | 10 | 83 | 235 |
| Career | | 122 | 261 | 754 | 58 | 213 | 130 | 195 | 437 | 334 | 24 | 236 | 710 |

=== Canberra Capitals ===
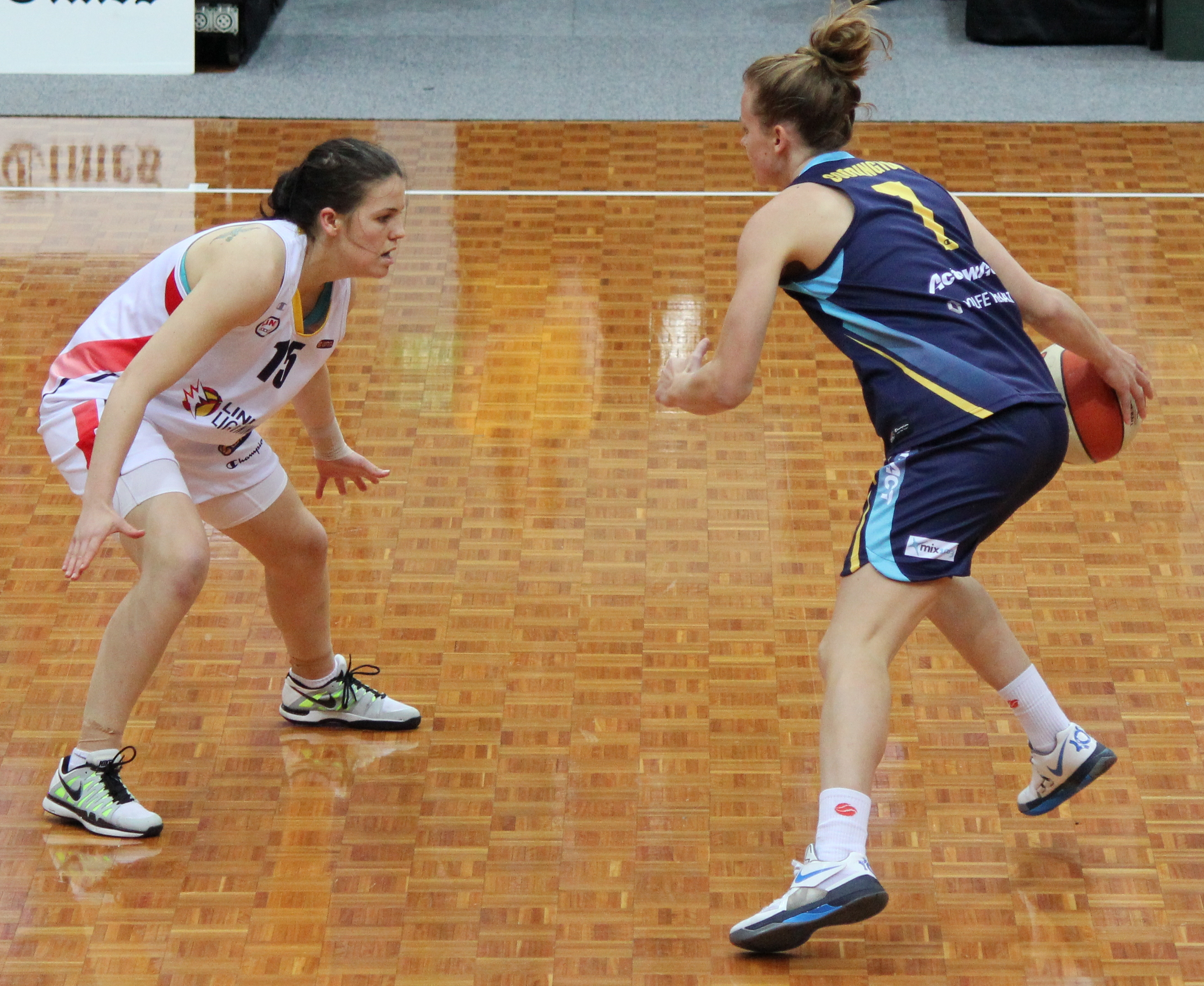
Coddington takes on Adelaide's Kelsey Ireland

Coddington signed with the Canberra Capitals for the 2011/2012 season in June 2011, around the same time that Lauren Jackson signed with the Capitals to play for them in 2012/2013. Coddington was expected to play the role of point guard and shooting guard. She participated in the team's first training session for the season on 13 September 2011 at the Belconnen Basketball Centre. It was her first season playing for the Canberra Capitals, and she played in her first match during the first game of the season when she played five minutes. She made her second appearance five weeks into the season. In that game, a match against West Coast Waves, she played eight minutes, made two assists and scored a three-point basket. She also played in the November match against the Australian Institute of Sport that was played in Albury, New South Wales. The expectation was that later in the season she would be able to come off the bench and play a similar role to Nicole Hunt.

=== National team ===
In 2006, Coddington was a member of the Australian U-19 "Gems" team.
