= Ilze Blicavs =

Australian basketball player

Personal information
- Born: Adelaide, South Australia

Sport
- Country: Australia
- Sport: Women's Basketball

Ilze Nagy (née Blicavs) is a former Australian women's basketball player.

== Biography ==
Blicavs played for the Australia women's national basketball team during the 1970s and competed for Australia at the 1975 World Championship held in Colombia.

Playing in an era before the creation of the Women's National Basketball League (WNBL) in 1981, Blicavs played for Sturt in the South Australian competition. Blicavs won the Halls Medal for the best and fairest player in the South Australian Women's competition on two occasions; 1973 and 1984.

Blicavs is married to Boti Nagy, who played basketball for South Australia at the national level during the 1970s. Their daughter, Ieva, played basketball for Troy University. Blicavs's brother, Andris Blicavs, played basketball for Australia at the 1974 and 1978 World Championships in Puerto Rico and the Philippines, as well as representing Australia at the 1976 Olympic Games in Montreal.

== See also ==
- Blicavs
