= 2014 WNBL Finals =

Team	Coach	Wins
Bendigo Spirit	Bernie Harrower	1
Townsville Fire	Chris Lucas	0
- Dates: 22 February – 9 March 2014
- MVP: Kelsey Griffin (BEN)
- Preliminary final: Townsville def. Dandenong, 1–0

The 2014 WNBL Finals was the postseason tournament of the WNBL's 2013–14 season. The Bendigo Spirit were the defending champions and they successfully defended their title by defeating the Townsville Fire.

== Standings ==
#	WNBL Championship Ladder				
#	Team	W	L	PCT	GP
1	Bendigo Spirit	22	2	91.7	24
2	Dandenong Rangers	16	8	66.6	24
3	Townsville Fire	16	8	66.6	24
4	Melbourne Boomers	14	10	58.5	24
5	Adelaide Lightning	12	12	50	24
6	Sydney Uni Flames	10	14	41.7	24
7	Canberra Capitals	10	14	41.7	24
8	Logan Thunder	7	17	29.2	24
9	West Coast Waves	1	23	4.2	24

== Bracket ==
Semifinals
Bendigo Spirit	71
Dandenong Rangers	62
Townsville Fire	78
Melbourne Boomers	73

Preliminary final
Dandenong Rangers	71
Townsville Fire	74

Grand final
9 March 2014 – Bendigo Stadium
Bendigo Spirit	94
Townsville Fire	83

== Semi-finals ==
=== (1) Bendigo Spirit vs. (2) Dandenong Rangers ===
23 February 2014

Boxscore

Bendigo Spirit	71–62	Dandenong Rangers
Scoring by quarter: 17–23, 21–15, 20–14, 13–10
Pts: Griffin 19; Rebs: Griffin 16; Asts: Harrower 10		Pts: O'Hea 16; Rebs: Pedersen 8 Asts: Mitchell 5

Bendigo Stadium, Bendigo, Victoria

=== (3) Townsville Fire vs. (4) Melbourne Boomers ===
22 February 2014

Boxscore

Townsville Fire	78–73	Melbourne Boomers
Scoring by quarter: 22–19, 15–17, 21–23, 20–14
Pts: Batkovic 24; Rebs: Batkovic 15; Asts: McCully 7		Pts: Allen 22; Rebs: Hegge 10; Asts: Madgen 7

Townsville RSL Stadium, Townsville, Queensland

== Preliminary final ==
=== (2) Dandenong Rangers vs. (3) Townsville Fire ===
2 March 2014

Boxscore

Dandenong Rangers	71–74	Townsville Fire
Scoring by quarter: 16–22, 15–12, 17–18, 23–22
Pts: O'Hea 27; Rebs: Pedersen 10; Asts: Mitchell, O'Hea 4		Pts: Cumming 15; Rebs: Batkovic 16; Asts: McCully 3

Dandenong Stadium, Melbourne, Victoria

== Grand Final ==
=== (1) Bendigo Spirit vs. (3) Townsville Fire ===
9 March 2014

Boxscore Report 1

Bendigo Spirit	94–83	Townsville Fire
Scoring by quarter: 25–17, 21–24, 24–28, 24–14
Pts: Griffin 28; Rebs: Griffin 15; Asts: Harrower 9		Pts: Batkovic 21; Rebs: Batkovic 9 Asts: McCully 6

Bendigo Stadium, Bendigo, Victoria
Attendance: 2,500

=== Rosters ===
2013–14 Bendigo Spirit roster
Players
Coaches

Pos.	No.	Nat.	Name	Ht.
G	4	(Australia)	Lavey, Tessa	1.72 m (5 ft 8 in)
G	5	(Australia)	Wilson, Andrea	1.73 m (5 ft 8 in)
G	6	(Australia)	Perera, Chantella	1.74 m (5 ft 9 in)
G	7	(Australia)	Oliver, Heather	1.78 m (5 ft 10 in)
G	9	(Australia)	Garrick, Madeleine	1.78 m (5 ft 10 in)
G	10	(Australia)	Harrower, Kristi (C)	1.62 m (5 ft 4 in)
F	14	(Canada)	Aubry, Chelsea	1.88 m (6 ft 2 in)
F	15	(Australia)	Blicavs, Sara	1.89 m (6 ft 2 in)
F/C	20	(Australia)	Richards, Gabrielle	1.88 m (6 ft 2 in)
G	22	(Australia)	Wilson, Kelly	1.70 m (5 ft 7 in)
F	23	(United States)	Griffin, Kelsey	1.88 m (6 ft 2 in)
G	24	(Australia)	Chalmers, Jane	1.63 m (5 ft 4 in)

Head coach

- (Australia) Bernie Harrower

Legend

- (C) Team captain
- (DP) Development player
- (I) Import player
- Injured

2013–14 Townsville Fire roster
Players
Coaches

Pos.	No.	Nat.	Name	Ht.
G	4	(Australia)	Wilson, Alex	1.80 m (5 ft 11 in)
G	5	(Australia)	McCully, Rachael	1.70 m (5 ft 7 in)
G	6	(Australia)	Mangakahia, Tiana	1.68 m (5 ft 6 in)
G	7	(Australia)	Cumming, Stephanie	1.78 m (5 ft 10 in)
C	8	(Australia)	Batkovic, Suzy	1.94 m (6 ft 4 in)
G	10	(Australia)	Newley, Mia	1.88 m (6 ft 2 in)
F	12	(United States)	Standish, Kayla	1.87 m (6 ft 2 in)
F	13	(Australia)	Fadljevic, Rosemary	1.83 m (6 ft 0 in)
F	15	(Australia)	Thompson, Olivia	1.85 m (6 ft 1 in)
G	32	(New Zealand)	Cocks, Micaela	1.74 m (5 ft 9 in)
C	45	(Australia)	McKenzie, Emma	1.89 m (6 ft 2 in)

Head coach

- (Australia) Chris Lucas

Legend

- (C) Team captain
- (DP) Development player
- (I) Import player
- Injured
