= Sara Blicavs =

Australian basketball player

Shichuan Yuanda Meile
- Position: Forward
- League: Women's Chinese Basketball Association

Personal information
- Born: 15 February 1993 (age 33) Sunbury, Victoria, Australia
- Listed height: 6 ft 2 in (1.88 m)

Career information
- Playing career: 2009–present

Career history
- 2009–2012: Australian Institute of Sport
- 2012–2013: Dandenong Rangers
- 2013–2015: Bendigo Spirit
- 2015–2019: Dandenong Rangers
- 2019–2023: Southside Flyers
- 2023–2024: Melbourne Boomers
- 2026: Shandong Six Stars

Career highlights
- 2× WNBL champion (2014, 2020); All-WNBL Second Team (2020)
- Stats at Basketball Reference
Medals
Women's basketball
Representing Australia
FIBA World Cup
Bronze medal – third place	2022 Australia
Asia Cup
Gold medal – first place	2025 China
Silver medal – second place	2017 India
Bronze medal – third place	2019 India
FIBA Oceania Championship
Gold medal – first place	2015 Australia / New Zealand

Sara Blicavs (Latvian: Sāra Blicava; born 15 February 1993) is an Australian professional basketball player. She played 15 seasons in the Women's National Basketball League between 2009 and 2024.

== Career ==
Blicavs plays in the guard or forward positions.

=== WNBL ===
Blicavs began her career, playing for the Australian Institute of Sport. After a brief stint with the Dandenong Rangers, Blicavs moved to the Bendigo Spirit. There, she won her first WNBL championship. For the 2015–16 WNBL season, Blicavs returned to the Dandenong Rangers. Blicavs has been re-signed for a third season with the Rangers.

== National team ==
=== Youth level ===
Blicavs made her international debut with the Under-17 program at the FIBA Oceania Under-16 Championship in 2009. She would then go on to represent Australia at the FIBA Under-17 World Championship in France, where Australia placed seventh. She would then go on to represent the Gems at the FIBA Under-19 World Championship in Chile, where Australia narrowly missed out on bronze, placing fourth.

=== Senior level ===
Blicavs made her debut with the Opals at the 2015 FIBA Oceania Championship, where Australia took home Gold and qualified for the 2016 Summer Olympics. She also participated in the Olympic Test Event in Rio de Janeiro, in January 2016.

Blicavs played for the Opals at the 2020 Tokyo Olympics, where they lost in the quarterfinal.

In May 2025, Blicavs was named in the Opals squad for the 2025 FIBA Women's Asia Cup in China.

== Personal life ==
Blicavs is from Victoria, Australia. She is of Latvian descent through her father and Jersey (Channel Islands) descent through her mother. Her parents, Andris Blicavs and Karen Blicavs, both played for Australian national basketball teams, and her brother Mark plays for the Geelong Football Club. Her parents' careers in basketball both ended because of knee injuries. She is 188 centimetres (6 ft 2 in) tall.

== See also ==
- Blicavs
