= 2001–02 WNBL season =

- League: Women's National Basketball League
- Sport: Basketball
- Duration: October 2001 – February 2002
- Number of teams: 8
- TV partner(s): ABC

Regular season
- Top seed: Adelaide Lightning
- Season MVP: Penny Taylor (Dandenong Rangers)
- Top scorer: Penny Taylor (Dandenong Rangers)

Finals
- Champions: Canberra Capitals
- Runners-up: Sydney Panthers
- Finals MVP: Lauren Jackson (Canberra Capitals)

WNBL seasons
- ← 2000–01 2002–03 →

The 2001–02 WNBL season was the 22nd season of competition since its establishment in 1981. A total of 8 teams contested the league.

== Team standings ==
#	WNBL Championship Ladder				
#	Team	W	L	PCT	GP
1	Adelaide Lightning	17	4	80.95	21
2	Canberra Capitals	15	6	71.43	21
3	Dandenong Rangers	15	6	71.43	21
4	Sydney Panthers	13	8	61.9	21
5	AIS	11	10	52.38	21
6	Bulleen Boomers	6	15	28.57	21
7	Perth Lynx	4	17	19.05	21
8	Townsville Fire	3	18	14.29	21

== Finals ==
Semifinals
Adelaide Lightning	62
Canberra Capitals	66
Dandenong Rangers	85
Sydney Panthers	98

Preliminary final
Adelaide Lightning	64
Sydney Panthers	66

Grand final
Canberra Capitals	75
Sydney Panthers	69

== Season award winners ==
Award	Winner	Team
Most Valuable Player Award	Penny Taylor	Dandenong Rangers
Grand Final MVP Award	Lauren Jackson	Canberra Capitals
Rookie of the Year Award	Alison Downie; Kamala Lamshed	Dandenong Rangers; Adelaide Lightning
Defensive Player of the Year Award	Emily McInerny	Dandenong Rangers
Coach of the Year Award	Karen Dalton	Sydney Panthers
Top Shooter Award	Penny Taylor	Dandenong Rangers

== Statistics leaders ==
Category	Player	Team	GP	Totals	Average
Points Per Game	Penny Taylor	Dandenong Rangers	20	570	28.5
Rebounds Per Game	Suzy Batkovic	Townsville Fire	21	256	12.2
Assists Per Game	Jae Kingi-Cross	Adelaide Lightning	21	100	4.8
Steals Per Game	Melissa McClure	Perth Lynx	21	52	2.5
Blocks per game	Lauren Jackson	Canberra Capitals	13	44	3.4
Field Goal %	Lauren Jackson	Canberra Capitals	13	(118/224)	52.7%
Three-Point Field Goal %	Jessica Foley	AIS	(31/76)	40.8%	
Free Throw %	Deanna Smith	Adelaide Lightning	15	(19/19)	100%
