= 2000–01 WNBL season =

- League: Women's National Basketball League
- Sport: Basketball
- Duration: October 2000 – February 2001
- Number of teams: 8
- TV partner(s): ABC

Regular season
- Top seed: Canberra Capitals
- Season MVP: Penny Taylor (Dandenong Rangers)
- Top scorer: Penny Taylor (Dandenong Rangers)

Finals
- Champions: Sydney Panthers
- Runners-up: Canberra Capitals
- Finals MVP: Annie Burgess (Sydney Panthers)

WNBL seasons
- ← 1999–2000 2001–02 →

The 2000–01 WNBL season was the 21st season of competition since its establishment in 1981. A total of 8 teams contested the league.

== Team standings ==
#	WNBL Championship Ladder				
#	Team	W	L	PCT	GP
1	Canberra Capitals	17	4	81.0	21
2	Sydney Panthers	16	5	76.0	21
3	Adelaide Lightning	15	6	71.0	21
4	Dandenong Rangers	15	6	71.0	21
5	AIS	7	14	33.0	21
6	Bulleen Boomers	7	14	33.0	21
7	Perth Breakers	4	17	19.0	21
8	Melbourne Tigers	3	18	14.00	21

== Finals ==
Semifinals
Canberra Capitals	73
Sydney Panthers	56
Adelaide Lightning	71
Dandenong Rangers	83

Preliminary final
Sydney Panthers	78
Dandenong Rangers	72

Grand final
Canberra Capitals	65
Sydney Panthers	69

== Season award winners ==
Award	Winner	Team
Most Valuable Player Award	Penny Taylor	Dandenong Rangers
Grand Final MVP Award	Annie Burgess	Sydney Panthers
Rookie of the Year Award	Laura Summerton	AIS
Defensive Player of the Year Award	Emily McInerny	Dandenong Rangers
Coach of the Year Award	Mark Wright	Dandenong Rangers
Top Shooter Award	Penny Taylor	Dandenong Rangers

== Statistics leaders ==
Category	Player	Team	GP	Totals	Average
Points Per Game	Penny Taylor	Dandenong Rangers	21	536	25.5
Rebounds Per Game	Lauren Jackson	Canberra Capitals	20	284	14.2
Assists Per Game	Annie Burgess	Sydney Panthers	21	138	6.6
Steals Per Game	Penny Taylor	Dandenong Rangers	21	52	2.5
Blocks per game	Lauren Jackson	Canberra Capitals	20	86	4.3
Field Goal %	Allie Douglas	Dandenong Rangers	21	(108/202)	53.5%
Three-Point Field Goal %	Jae Kingi-Cross	Adelaide Lightning	19	(28/66)	42.4%
Free Throw %	Gina Stevens	Bulleen Boomers	20	(82/88)	93.2%
