= University of Canberra Capitals =

- Leagues: WNBL
- Founded: 1984
- History: Canberra Capitals; 1984–2014; University of Canberra Capitals; 2014–present
- Arena: AIS Arena
- Location: Canberra, Australia
- Team colours: Home: Navy/Teal/Gold; Away: White/Navy/Gold
- Team manager: Tracey Peacock
- Head coach: Paul Goriss
- Assistants: Natalie Hurst, Aidan Barnett, Abbie Ketels
- Team captain: Isabella Brancatisano, Nicole Munger
- Ownership: University of Canberra Union
- Championships: 9 (2000, 2002, 2003, 2006, 2007, 2009, 2010, 2019, 2019–20)

The University of Canberra Capitals are an Australian professional women's basketball team competing in the Women's National Basketball League (WNBL). The team is based in Canberra, Australian Capital Territory. In 2014 the University of Canberra Union took control of the Capitals from Basketball ACT. The University of Canberra is the current naming rights sponsor for the Capitals.

== History ==
Founded in 1984, the Capitals first competed in the WNBL in the 1986 season after winning the Women's Basketball Conference (WBC) in 1985. After struggling to make an impact on the competition for more than a decade, the Capitals became one of the dominant teams in the WNBL in the 2000s, due in part to the ascension of one of the greatest female players in the world Lauren Jackson. They have won the WNBL Grand Final in 2000, 2002, 2003, 2006, 2007, 2009, 2010, 2019 and 2019–20.

From 2017, the Capitals played out of the National Convention Centre Canberra for regular season games, as well as community and school venues Southern Cross Stadium, Tuggeranong and Radford College. For the 2024–25 WNBL season, the Capitals returned to the AIS Arena for the first time since the 2019–20 season after the venue received $15 million worth of repair work.

Between 2012 and 2018, the Canberra Capitals Academy played in the South East Australian Basketball League.

== WNBL Grand Final appearances ==
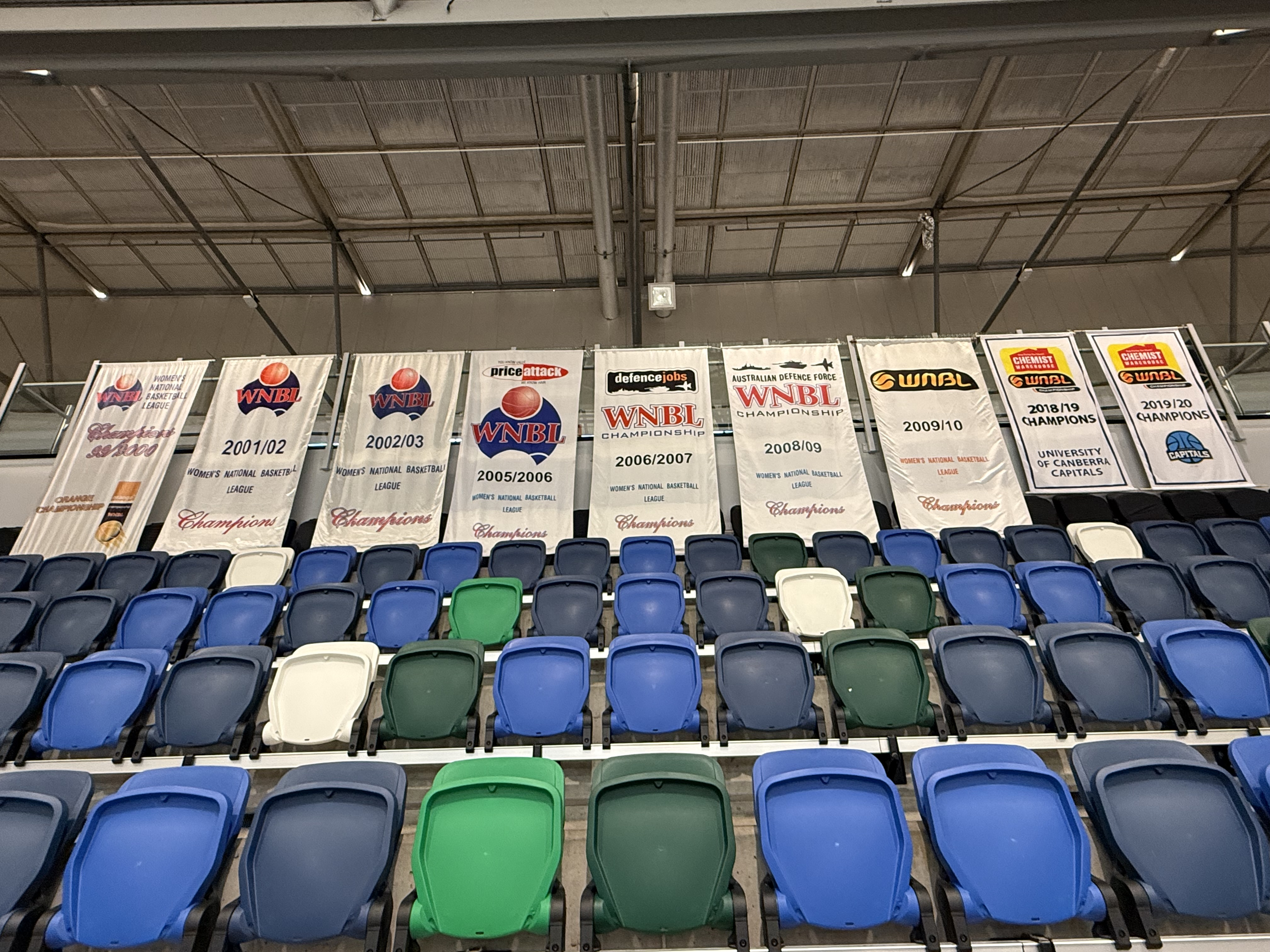
Canberra Capitals WNBL championship banners at AIS Arena, January 2026

The Capitals have competed in 11 Grand Finals, winning 9 (both WNBL records):

Season	Opponent	Result	Score	Venue
1999/00	Adelaide Lightning	Won	67–50	Clipsal Powerhouse, Adelaide
2000/01	Sydney Panthers	Lost	65–69	AIS Arena, Canberra
2001/02	Sydney Panthers	Won	75–69	AIS Arena, Canberra
2002/03	Sydney Flames	Won	69–67	AIS Arena, Canberra
2005/06	Dandenong Rangers	Won	68–55	Dandenong Basketball Stadium, Dandenong
2006/07	Sydney Uni Flames	Won	73–59	ACUVUE Sports Hall, Sydney
2008/09	Bulleen Boomers	Won	61–58	AIS Arena, Canberra
2009/10	Bulleen Boomers	Won	75–70	State Netball and Hockey Centre, Melbourne
2010/11	Bulleen Boomers	Lost	78–103	State Netball and Hockey Centre, Melbourne
2018/19	Adelaide Lightning	Won	93–73	AIS Arena, Canberra

== Season summaries ==
=== Season-by-season records ===
Season	Standings	Regular season			Finals	Head coach
Season	Standings	W	L	PCT	Finals	Head coach
Canberra Capitals
1986	6th	16	8	66.7	Did not qualify	Jerry Lee
1987	9th	7	13	35.0	Did not qualify	Ken Simpson
1988	5th	13	9	59.1	Did not qualify	Dave Nelson
1989	9th	8	15	34.8	Did not qualify	Guy Molloy
1990	11th	5	19	20.8	Did not qualify	Tony McGee
1991	5th	12	10	54.5	Did not qualify	Jerry Lee
1992	4th	11	9	55.0	Lost Semi Final (Dandenong, 65–67)	Jerry Lee
1993	8th	7	11	38.9	Did not qualify	Tad Duffelmeir
1994	7th	7	11	38.9	Did not qualify	Jerry Lee
1995	6th	8	10	44.4	Did not qualify	Michelle Wall
1996	8th	5	13	27.8	Did not qualify	Michelle Wall
1997	6th	6	12	33.3	Did not qualify	Mike McHugh
1998	8th	2	10	16.7	Did not qualify	Mike McHugh
1998–99	8th	4	17	19.0	Did not qualify	Mike McHugh
1999–00	1st	16	5	76.2	Lost Semi Final (Adelaide, 84–91); Won Preliminary Final (Bulleen, 80–66); Won Grand Final (Adelaide, 67–50)	Carrie Graf
2000–01	1st	17	4	81.0	Won Semi Final (Sydney, 73–56); Lost Grand Final (Sydney, 65–69)	Carrie Graf
2001–02	2nd	15	6	71.4	Won Semi Final (Adelaide, 66–62); Won Grand Final (Sydney, 75–69)	Carrie Graf
2002–03	1st	16	5	76.2	Won Semi Final (Townsville, 68–67); Won Grand Final (Sydney, 69–67)	Tom Maher
2003–04	4th	13	8	61.9	Lost Semi Final (Adelaide, 63–72)	Carrie Graf
2004–05	5th	9	12	42.9	Did not qualify	Tom Maher
2005–06	3rd	14	7	66.7	Won Semi Final (Bulleen, 67–62); Won Preliminary Final (Adelaide, 83–81); Won Grand Final (Dandenong, 68–55)	Carrie Graf
2006–07	2nd	15	6	71.4	Lost Semi Final (Sydney, 65–74); Won Preliminary Final (Adelaide, 82–74); Won Grand Final (Sydney, 73–59)	Carrie Graf
2007–08	3rd	17	7	70.8	Lost Semi Final (Dandenong, 54–60)	Carrie Graf
2008–09	1st	19	3	86.4	Won Semi Final (Bulleen, 60–52); Won Grand Final (Bulleen, 61–58)	Carrie Graf
2009–10	3rd	16	6	72.7	Won Semi Final (Townsville, 60–39); Won Preliminary Final (Sydney, 61–56); Won Grand Final (Bulleen, 75–70)	Carrie Graf
2010–11	2nd	18	4	81.8	Lost Semi Final (Bulleen, 67–71); Won Preliminary Final (Bendigo, 83–78); Lost Grand Final (Bulleen, 78–103)	Carrie Graf
2011–12	8th	9	13	40.9	Did not qualify	Carrie Graf
2012–13	8th	7	17	29.2	Did not qualify	Carrie Graf
2013–14	7th	10	14	41.7	Did not qualify	Carrie Graf
University of Canberra Capitals
2014–15	5th	11	11	50.0	Did not qualify	Carrie Graf
2015–16	9th	2	22	8.3	Did not qualify	Carrie Graf
2016–17	5th	13	11	54.2	Did not qualify	Paul Goriss
2017–18	6th	7	14	33.3	Did not qualify	Paul Goriss
2018–19	1st	16	5	76.2	Won Semi Final (Perth, 2–0); Won Grand Final (Adelaide, 2–1)	Paul Goriss
2019–20	2nd	15	6	71.4	Won Semi Final (Melbourne, 2–1); Won Grand Final (Southside, 2–0)	Paul Goriss
2020	3rd	9	4	69.2	Lost Semi Final (Melbourne Boomers, 68–78)	Paul Goriss
2021–22	3rd	11	6	64.7	Lost Semi Final (Perth Lynx, 0–1)	Paul Goriss
2022–23	8th	2	19	9.5	Did not qualify	Kristen Veal
2023–24	8th	4	17	19.0	Did not qualify	Kristen Veal
2024-25	5th	8	13	38.1	Did not qualify	Paul Goriss
2025-26	5th	9	14	39.1	Did not qualify	Paul Goriss
Regular season		429	426	50.2	5 Minor Premierships	
Finals		22	10	68.8	9 WNBL Championships	

=== 1990 to 1998/99 ===
In 1992 the Canberra City Group Capitals made the WNBL finals for the first time since their inception in 1984. The team finished 4th in the 11 team competition under coach Jerry Lee, with an 11–9 win–loss record. Jodie Murphy was named the top shooter in the WNBL for the season with 17.9 ppg and also made the WNBL All Star Five alongside Michelle Timms (Perth Breakers), Allison Cook (Melbourne Tigers), Michelle Brogan (Adelaide City) and Rachael Sporn (Adelaide City). Shooting guard Narelle Fletcher also ranked 3rd in the league in 3-point percentage, shooting 37% for the season (27/73). The team was knocked out in the Preliminary Final by the 3rd placed Dandenong Rangers 75-65 (J. Murphy 23 pts, K. Tominac 13).

After some success in 1992, hopes were high in 1993 for the Capitals to become a premiership contender under new coach Tad Duffelmeir. These hopes increased with the recruitment of 196 cm Ukrainian centre Diana Sadovnikova in round 6 of the competition. Unfortunately the Capitals were unable to find stability with the rest of the team and were unable to replicate their form from the previous season. The Capitals finished 7th in the 10 team league with a 7–11 win–loss record.

The Capitals once again hired Jerry Lee as their head coach for the 1994 season, hoping to replicate their finals experience two years earlier. They signed another European import, Joulia Goureeva to bolster the club alongside Sandovnikova. Despite the return of Lee and the two European imports the team still struggled for consistency, again finishing with a 7–11 record leaving them in 7th spot in the 10 team league.

Canberra started the 1995 season with a new coach, Michelle Wall. Unfortunately they lost the services of their two European imports Diana Sadovnikova and Joulia Goureeva who both departed to play for the Dandenong Rangers. The Capitals recruited forward/centre Latonya McGhee from the University of Florida, who finished went on to average 17.2 ppg (4th in the league) and 10.4 rpg (2nd in the league) and guard Cherie Hogg who returned to Australia after a two-year stint playing for the University of Nevada Las Vegas. Despite the good form of the new recruits the team still finished 6th in the league with an 8–10 win–loss record.

1996 saw Kerryn Owens step into the Captain role and lead from the point guard position. Cheree Hogg departed for her hometown team Adelaide Lightning and Capitals also lost McGhee, who returned to the U.S. To add experience to a young team the Capitals signed Opals forward Fiona Robinson from Perth. Robinson went on to average 17.8 ppg (equal 5th in the league) and 7.5 rpg (4th in the league) and was selected in the Opals team and won a bronze medal for Australia at the 1996 Atlanta Olympics. Joulia Goureeva also returned to the Capitals from Dandenong. The addition of Robinson and New Zealand guard Kim Wielens was not enough for the Capitals however as they finished 8th in the league with a 5–13 win–loss record.

The Capitals improved in 1997 narrowly missing out on a finals spot. The club signed American import Tanya Haave who combined well with Co-Captains Owens and Robinson, with the trio scoring an average of 40+ points per game between them. The club also added small forward Eleanor Sharp and AIS graduate guard Kellie Abrams to the squad. Haave proved to be a good recruit for the club and was named team MVP for the season and the team finished equal 6th with Brisbane, just missing out on a top 5 finals spot with a 6–12 win–loss record.

The Capitals lost their three leading scorers, Fiona Robinson, Tanya Haave and Kerryn Owens for the 1998 season. Robinson quit the WNBL to represent Australia in European Handball prior to the 2000 Sydney Olympics, while Haave continued her career with Swedish team Sätila SK, and Owens was recruited to play in Holland. As a result, the team struggled to remain competitive, finishing second last in the competition with a 2–10 win–loss record, beating only the winless Brisbane. Thankfully the season was a shortened one, as the WNBL switched to a summer league later that year.

In 1998/99 the WNBL switched to a summer competition for the first time. The season signalled the beginning of a turnaround for the Capitals program. The club secured Opals shooting guard Shelley Sandie who returned to the WNBL after the collapse of the US ABL league. Sandie combined with new centre/forward Karen Smith to make the Capitals a competitive team, however the club still finished last with a 4–17 record. Sandie was honoured with a WNBL life membership and was also named in the WNBL All Star Five at the end of the season, alongside Kristi Harrower (Melbourne Tigers), Rachael Sporn (Adelaide Lightning), Lauren Jackson (AIS) and Gina Stevens (Perth Breakers).

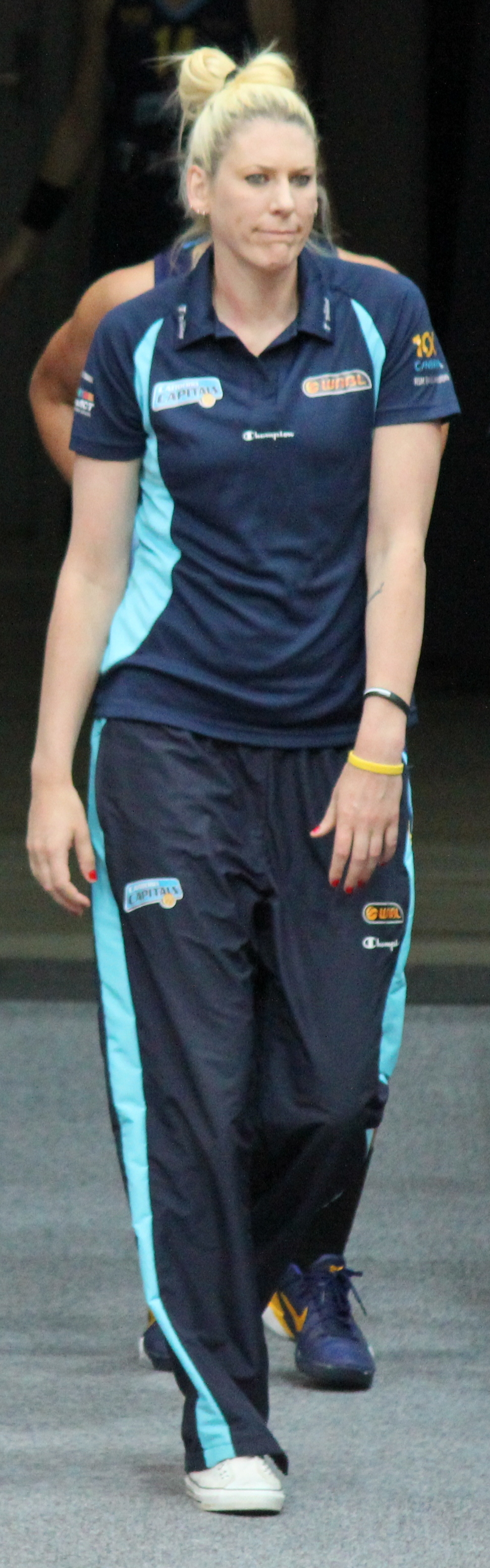
Lauren Jackson joined the Capitals in 1999 and went on to win five WNBL titles with the team.

=== 1999/2000 season ===
The 1999/2000 season provided the Capitals with their biggest turnaround in franchise history. On the back of signing premiership winning coach Carrie Graf from Sydney, the Capitals managed to secure the nucleus of their WNBL dynasty by recruiting a number of graduates from the 1998/99 championship winning AIS team. The Capitals signed 1998/99 league MVP Lauren Jackson in a recruitment coup that also netted the club point guard Kristen Veal and swingman Deanna Smith. When these three pieces of the puzzle were combined with veterans Shelley Sandie and Karen Smith along with forward Eleanor Sharp the Capitals finally had a team capable of contending for the WNBL title.

The Capitals managed to live up to pre-season expectations, finishing as minor premiers with a 16–5 win–loss record. In the Major Semi Final the Capitals played the 2nd placed Adelaide Lightning at the AIS Arena, going down in a hard-fought match 84–91. The loss meant they needed to back up in the Preliminary Final against the 3rd placed Bulleen Boomers. This proved to be a much easier matchup, with the Capitals winning 80–66. Having now lost home court advantage for the Grand Final, Canberra made the trip to Adelaide to avenge their semi-final loss. The Capitals triumphed 67–50, raising the banner for the first time in the club's history. Jackson finished the season as WNBL top scorer with 23.4 ppg, while Kristen Veal topped the league in assists with 4.9 apg. Jackson was also named league MVP for the season, appearing in the WNBL All Star Five alongside Trisha Fallon (Sydney Flames), Kristi Harrower (Melbourne Tigers), Kristin Folkl (Melbourne Tigers) and Jo Hill (Adelaide Lightning).

=== 2000/01 season ===
After 2 seasons with the Capitals, centre Karen Smith decided to quit the game for personal reasons prior to the opening of the 2000/01 season. The Capitals replaced her with Lucille Hamilton, the 187 cm forward from Dandenong. Deanna Smith also left the club for Adelaide while guard Kim Wielens decided to take a break from the WNBL.

The change in personnel did not appear to affect the Capitals however, as the team managed to improve on their minor premier performance from the previous season, coming first with a 17–4 win–loss record. Lauren Jackson recorded the 2nd highest ppg for the league with 21.6 (behind league MVP Penny Taylor's 25.5 ppg), while Shelley Sandie provided the one-two punch from outside, recording the league's 4th highest scoring average with 17.3 ppg. Jackson also led the league in rebounds with 14.2 rpg and blocked shots with 4.3 bpg.

In the Major Semi Final at the AIS arena, Canberra thrashed the 2nd placed Sydney Panthers 73–56 winning the right to host the WNBL Grand Final for the first time. The week off did them no favours however, as Sydney overcame a half time deficit to win the Grand Final 69-65 despite Jackson recording figures of 22 points, 20 rebounds and 8 blocked shots for the game.

=== 2001/02 season ===
Canberra finished the regular season 2nd on the ladder with a 15–6 win–loss record. They faced minor premiers Adelaide in the Major Semi Final in Adelaide, winning a hard-fought game 66-62 thanks to 30 points from Lauren Jackson. The win gave them the right to host the Grand Final at the AIS Arena for the second year running. In the following weekends Preliminary Final the 4th placed Sydney also beat Adelaide in a close game, 66–64, setting up a repeat of the previous season's Grand Final.

This time the result would be different. The Capitals avenged the previous seasons loss, beating Sydney in the 2001/02 decider 75-69 for their second WNBL crown and their first title won in front of the home fans. Jackson again dominated the game with 29 points and 21 rebounds. The Grand Final win allowed Shelley Sandie to retire from the WNBL on a winning note having played in 321 WNBL games throughout her career, ranking her 6th on the competition's all-time player list. The win also gave coach Carrie Graf a fitting farewell as she left the Capitals to concentrate on establishing a WNBA coaching career.

=== 2002/03 season ===
Canberra entered the 2003/03 season with a new head coach, WNBL legend Tom Maher. The team also suited up without the retired Shelley Sandie, guard Kim Wielens and up and coming forward Jacinta Hamilton, who left to play for the Dandenong Rangers. Despite this loss of depth and experience the Capitals core group of Lauren Jackson, Kristen Veal, Lucille Hamilton, Eleanor Sharp and Kellie Abrams went one step better than the 2001/02 team, finishing the competition as minor premiers with a 16–5 win–loss record.

This time the team faced second placed Townsville in the Major Semi Final, overcoming them in a thrilling one point victory 68-67 thanks to Lauren Jackson's domination with 38 points, 21 rebounds and 9 blocks. The win gave them the right to host the Grand Final at the AIS Arena for the third year running. In the following weekends Preliminary Final the 3rd placed Sydney also beat Townsville 83–78, setting up the third Grand Final between the two rivals.

The Capitals completed their first back-to-back premiership, beating Sydney 69–67 in a tense decider with Jackson replicating her Semi Final dominance, with 30 points and 23 rebounds. Jackson was named the WNBL MVP for the third time, dominating the league with an average of 27.2 points per game (almost 10 ppg more than the league's second highest scorer, Perth's Carly Wilson) and 11.6 rebounds per game.

==== 2003 FIBA Women's World Cup Championship ====
As the defending WNBL Champions, the Capitals represented Australia at the inaugural FIBA Women's World Cup held in Russia on 14–19 October 2003. The Capitals were included in Group B of the competition, alongside EuroLeague runners-up US Valenciennes (France), ANSO Volgaburmash Samara (Russia) and Mambas de Mozambique (Mozambique). Group A included the EuroLeague champions UMMC Ekaterinbourg (Russia), Woori Bank Hansae (South Korea), São Paulo Futebal Clube (Brazil) and a WNBA Select Team (United States).

The Capitals, including new recruits Jo Hill, Zoe Carr and Kate Cohen, finished equal 2nd in Group B and 5th overall with a 3–2 record, beating Mambas 102–45, São Paulo 88-66 and Woori Bank Hansae 74–63, while losing to USVA Valenciennes 89-68 and Volgaburmash 72–56.

=== 2004/05 season ===
The 2004/05 season saw the WNBL celebrate its 25th anniversary and for the Canberra Capitals it became a year of rebuilding. The team which was knocked out in the Minor Semi Final against Adelaide the season before had lost their coach Carrie Graf to the Phoenix Mercury in the WNBA. In her place returned Tom Maher, confirming his commitment in May 2004 to coach the Capitals for the second time in 3 seasons. However, Maher's desire to coach Lauren Jackson a second time around took a turn for the worse as Jackson was ruled out of the entire WNBL season after undergoing ankle surgery at the end of the 2004 WNBA competition. The Capitals had another blow with point guard Kristen Veal deciding to quit the WNBL before the season started, citing a loss of passion for the game.

Thankfully the Capitals had already coaxed veteran centre Jenny Whittle out of retirement and had also picked up 18-year-old New Zealand point guard Angela Marino from the local Adelaide competition. Whittle last played in the WNBL for Bulleen in 1999/00 and had just retired after playing professionally in Spain and France. When Veal confirmed that she was no longer playing in the WNBL, the Capitals managed to snare point guard Tully Bevilaqua from the Indiana Fever in the WNBA. Veteran small forward Eleanor Sharp was named captain for the season, replacing Jackson in that role. Seven games into the season, the Capitals were struck another blow with defensive specialist Kellie Abrams announcing she was quitting the club in what appeared to be a personality clash with coach Maher. Replacing Abrams in the Capitals squad was New Zealand international forward Donna Loffhagen, signed by the club to bolster their rebounding presence in the absence of the injured Jackson.

Loffhagen finished the season with the highest average rebounding record in the WNBL with 10.0 rpg, while Marino ended up as the 5th highest scorer with 17.5 ppg. Bevilaqua finished with the highest 3pt percentage in the competition, hitting a remarkable 45% of her outside shots (36/80). Despite the good form of the new recruits, the Capitals finished 5th in the 8 team comp with a 9–12 win–loss record, missing the finals for the first time in 5 years.

==== WNBL 25th Anniversary Team ====
To celebrate the WNBL's milestone of 25 seasons, the league announced an anniversary team of 10 players and head coach. Three Capitals players made it into the honorary team: Lauren Jackson; Shellie Sandie; Jenny Cheesman as well as coach Tom Maher.

In order of votes, the players named were:

Rank	Name	Team(s)
1	Lauren Jackson	AIS, Canberra
2	Robyn Maher	Melbourne, Melbourne East, Tasmania, Perth, Sydney
3	Michele Timms	Bulleen, Melbourne East, Perth, Sydney
4	Rachael Sporn	West Adelaide, North Adelaide, Adelaide
5	Shelley Sandie	Melbourne East, AIS, Dandenong, Sydney, Canberra
6	Penny Taylor	AIS, Dandenong
7	Julie Nykiel	Noarlunga
8	Jenny Cheesman	Noarlunga, AIS, Canberra
9	Karin Maar	CYMS, Coburg, Bulleen
10	Trisha Fallon	AIS, Melbourne, Sydney
Coach	Tom Maher	Melbourne, Nunawading, Tasmania, Perth, Sydney, Canberra

=== 2005/06 season ===
The 2005/06 season saw the return of coach Carrie Graf who was cut as head coach of the WNBA club Phoenix Mercury after achieving a 33–35 win–loss record over the 2004 and 2005 seasons. On her return, coach Graf signed Adelaide's 1998 premiership winning centre Tracey Beatty to bolster the team's front court. The twin towers of Beatty (203 cm) and Whittle (197 cm) had the job of replacing Lauren Jackson who was ruled out of the early rounds of the competition due to injury. To compensate for the loss of scoring power provided by Jackson, Graf used her U.S. connections to engineer a WNBL coup by signing WNBA All Star guard/forward Alana Beard for 8 games. Beard averaged 26.9 points and 3 steals a game, also setting the third highest individual scoring game ever for the Capitals, with 41 points on 11 November 2005. In the 8 games she played in the WNBL, Beard proved to be one of the best imports to have played in the league. The Capitals also welcomed back guard Kellie Abrams.

Although Beard departed after the return of Lauren Jackson, the rest of the WNBL teams could not contend with the triple towers of Beatty, Whittle and Jackson. The Capitals met the Adelaide Lightning in the semi-final, overcoming them in a thrilling 83–81 overtime victory. They went on to win the WNBL Grand Final, defeating the minor premiers Dandenong Rangers 68–55. Lauren Jackson was named the Grand Final MVP, scoring a game high 24 points. Coach Carrie Graf and centre Jenny Whittle were also honoured with a WNBL lifetime memberships.

=== 2006/07 season ===
The 2006/07 season heralded a new beginning for the Capitals. Superstar forward Lauren Jackson left the club to pursue her career in Europe, while Jenny Whittle again retired from the WNBL. To replace Jackson and Whittle in the front court the Capitals tried to recruit AIS centre Hollie Grima, however they missed out on signing Grima who instead went on to become the league's MVP with the Bulleen Boomers. The Capitals did however sign guard Jess Bibby from Dandenong and forward Abby Bishop from the AIS to complement the core group of Beatty, Abrams, Sharp and Bevilaqua.

On the back of an all-round team performance during the season the Capitals finished second on the WNBL ladder with a 15–6 win–loss record. Livewire guard Jess Bibby top scored for the Caps with 15.5 ppg, while centre Tracey Beatty filled the gap left by Jackson and Whittle finishing in the WNBL top 10 categories for Blocked Shots (2.8 bpg, first in the league), Total Rebounds (7.4 rpg) and Field Goal Percentage (49.7%). The Caps faced first placed Sydney in the major semi-final, losing 74-65 and setting up a repeat of the previous year's Preliminary Final against Adelaide. Once again the Capitals triumphed over the Lightning, winning their way through to another Grand Final, 82–74.

The Capitals won their 5th WNBL title, avenging their semi-final loss to the Sydney Uni Flames with a 73–59 victory at the ACUVUE Sports Hall. Centre Tracey Beatty was named the Grand Final MVP courtesy of her 12 points, 12 rebounds, 3 assists and 3 blocked shots.

=== 2007/08 season ===
The Capitals finished the 2007/08 season third on the WNBL ladder with a 17–7 win–loss record. Jess Bibby again top scored for the team with 16.1 ppg while Tracey Beatty topped the league in Field Goal Percentage (58.2%) and ranked second in Blocked Shots with 2.3 bpg.

The team was knocked out in the minor semi-final by Dandenong 60–54, ending their quest for a championship three-peat.

=== 2008/09 season ===
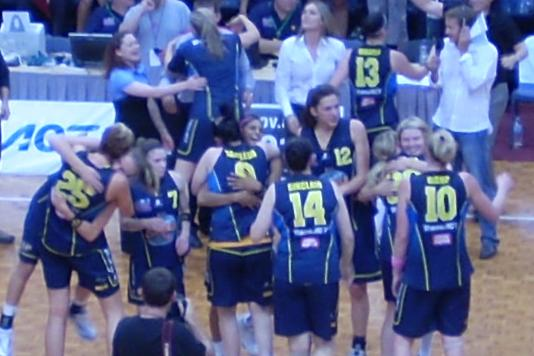
Capitals win the 2009 WNBL Title

The Capitals had a further boost in April 2009 with coach Carrie Graf extending her contract for a further 4 seasons after being appointed as the Australian Opals head coach.

On the back of a WNBL All-Star 5 season from Abby Bishop, who topped the WNBL in rebounding with 10.7 rpg on top of 17.3 points per game the Capitals finished the regular season as minor premiers with a 19–3 record. The Capitals faced 2nd place Bulleen in the Major Semi Final at the AIS Arena, beating them 60–52 to win their way into their 7th Grand Final.

The Capitals won their 6th Grand Final in 10 years on 13 March 2009, defeating the Bulleen Boomers 61–58 at the AIS Arena. Point Guard Natalie Hurst was named Grand Final MVP after a 12-point, 6 rebound performance. She was assisted by Michelle Musselwhite who top scored for the Capitals with 13 points, forward Abby Bishop (six points, 14 rebounds) and centre Marianna Tolo who starred off the bench with 12 points, 9 rebounds and 5 blocked shots.

=== 2009/10 season ===
The Capitals began the 2009/10 WNBL season with a number of changes to their roster. Opals forward and MVP from 2008 to 2009, Abby Bishop, started the season rehabilitating from an injury to her shoulder suffered while playing with the Rockhampton Cyclones in the Queensland Basketball League during the WNBL off season. Bishop was replaced by 20-year-old New Zealand international centre/forward Jess McCormack. The team also lost guard/forward Michelle Cosier (née Musselwhite) who fell pregnant during the offseason. Cosier was replaced by ex Opals guard Carly Wilson who left French team Challes-les-Eaux, signing a one-year deal to play under Opals coach Carrie Graf in an attempt to improve her chances of representing Australia at the 2010 World Championships. Peta Sinclair retired from the WNBL to take up a scholarship coaching role with the AIS women's basketball team and guard Michaela Bennie left to focus on university studies. Replacing Sinclair and Bennie on the Capitals bench was 20-year-old point guard Nicole Romeo, who signed with the Capitals after quitting the University of Washington Huskies after her freshman season, and 22-year-old forward Katie Rose, who returned to the Capitals after last playing for them in the 2004–05 season.

On 25 November the Canberra Capitals made the international women's basketball signing coup of the year by enticing Lauren Jackson back to the WNBL with a $220,000 contract to play out the remainder of the season. Jackson received a clearance from her Russian club WBC Spartak Moscow following the assassination of team owner Shabtai von Kalmanovich on 2 November. Jackson was recovering from stress fractures in her back at the AIS when an approach was made to her with funding acquired from a consortium of the ACT government, Canberra businesses and local football clubs, the Canberra Raiders and the ACT Brumbies. Jackson played her first game back in the WNBL on 12 December vs the Perth Lynx, scoring 18 points and taking 7 rebounds. The return of Bishop and Jackson to the Capitals lineup saw the release of Jess McCormack who struggled to make an impact in her time on court.

The Capitals finished the WNBL season 3rd on the table with a 16–6 win–loss record, behind the Bulleen Boomers and Sydney Uni Flames. The team faced the 4th placed Townsville Fire in the second semi-final at the AIS Arena, after the Fire beat Bendigo 84-73 only 4 days earlier in an elimination final. The Capitals dominated a fatigued Townsville, winning 70-39 and in so doing set a WNBL record in limiting Townsville to the lowest score in a finals matchup. The win meant Canberra faced their arch rival Sydney at the Sydney Olympic Park Sports Centre in the Preliminary Final. The Capitals triumphed 61–56 in a physical encounter, winning their way to an 8th Grand Final in a replay of last season's decider against minor premiers Bulleen.

On 6 March 2010, Canberra raised their 8th WNBL banner with a hard-fought 75–70 win over Bulleen at the sold-out State Netball and Hockey Centre in Melbourne. After 23 lead changes during the game, the Capitals finished off the match with a 13–2 run in the last four and a half minutes to clinch the decider. Lauren Jackson was named the Grand Final MVP with 18 points and 13 rebounds but she was well supported by Natalie Hurst who top scored for the Caps with 21 and Marianna Tolo who pulled down 8 rebounds and made 6 blocks through the game. Bulleen swingman Jenna O'Hea top scored for the match with 26 points to go with her 7 rebounds.

=== 2010/11 season ===
After winning four championships over the past five seasons, the Capitals again entered a rebuilding phase after winning the 2009/10 title. Lauren Jackson departed the club for the third time to re-establish her career in Europe and the United States, captain (and club game record holder) Kellie Abrams retired, while point guard and 206 WNBL game veteran, Natalie Hurst left to join the Aix en Provence club in France on a one-year deal. The loss of Hurst signalled the end of an era for the club given she was the only Capitals player to have suited up for the team in all 7 of their championship wins. Forward Abby Bishop also left the Capitals to join the Dandenong Rangers on a one-year deal after failing to secure a contract with a European club. Reserve guard Chantella Perera became the fourth player to depart, joining Bishop at Dandenong on a one-season deal. Centre Tracey Beatty also decided to take the season off due to her ongoing ankle injuries. These departures left Carly Wilson as the only surviving member of the championship winning starting five from the previous season.

The club was however able to soften the blow of losing Jackson, Beatty and Bishop from the front court by enticing Sydney Flames and Opals powerhouse centre Suzy Batkovic to Canberra on a one-year deal. The club also secured Canberra born point guard Alison Lacey and Dandenong backup point guard Nicole Hunt on a one-year deals to replace Hurst. Lacey returning home in the WNBA off-season after being recruited by the Seattle Storm as the 10th pick in the 2010 WNBA draft. Returning for the Capitals were centre Marianna Tolo and guard Carly Wilson who both signed on for one more season.

The Capitals opened the 2010/11 season with a grand final replay against the Bulleen Boomers at the Veneto Club in Bulleen, winning 79–71. Unfortunately Suzy Batkovic injured her knee in the victory, sitting her out for the following 4 weeks. To cover for the injured centre the Capitals were able to entice Tracey Beatty out of retirement on a short-term contract, which eventuated in her remaining on board for the entire season. The Caps went on to finish second on the WNBL table with an 18–4 record, Bulleen finishing first with a 19–3 record. The scene was set for another grand final showdown between the two powerhouse clubs with Bulleen centre and league MVP Liz Cambage joining swingman Jenna O'Hea in the WNBL All Star 5 (for the second year running) up against Capitals All Star 5 forward Tolo and last year's All Star 5 centre Batkovic, alongside Opal swingman Wilson and the emerging point guard Hunt.

The Capitals lost their first round Semi Final against Bulleen 71–67, after leading 25–12 at quarter time. This result gave Bulleen their second consecutive home Grand Final. Captain Jess Bibby top scored for the Caps with 22 points, while bench forward Hannah Bowley grabbed the most boards with 8. Canberra then took care of Bendigo in the Preliminary Final, winning 83–78, with Wilson top scoring with 21 points and Tolo grabbing 9 boards to go with her 20 points. The win set up another Grand Final showdown with Bulleen, however this time the result was vastly different from 2009/10, with Bulleen coming off a week's break to beat the Capitals 103–78 in the decider, setting a new WNBL record for the highest Grand Final score recorded. Bulleen Point Guard Sharin Milner finished her WNBL career as Grand Final MVP by top scoring for the Boomers with 27 points at a remarkable 82% success rate. Canberra Centre Suzie Batkivic top scored for the game with 28 points with Michelle Cosier chipping in 19, however the Boomers were far too good on the day with five players scoring in double figures, securing the club's first WNBL grand final win in emphatic style.

=== 2011/12 season ===
15 October 2011 Canberra Capitals v Townsville Fire home opener at AIS Arena in Canberra. Capitals lost.

The 2011/12 season saw significant turnover in the Capitals roster. During the offseason the team lost Opals centre Suzy Batkovic to the Adelaide Lightning, centre Tracey Beatty to retirement, point guard Nicole Romeo to the Townsville Fire as well as forwards Rebecca Haynes and Michaela Dalgleish and guard Alison Lacey. The Capitals recruited forwards Molly Lewis from Sydney, Brigitte Ardossi from the Georgia Tech Yellow Jackets and Lauren Angel from University of Portland, guard Mikaela Dombkins who sat out the 2010/11 WNBL season due to injuries, as well as two Canberra locals, forward Alice Coddington returning from Utah State University and swingman Abbie Davis. During the preseason the Capitals also lost their key starting off-guard Michelle Cosier for at least the first half of the season, to osteitis pubis.

The Capitals season began with a difficult road trip to play the defending champions Bulleen at the Veneto Club and Dandenong at the Dandenong Basketball stadium. The Capitals struggled for offensive cohesion in both games, losing the first 68-88 and the second 63–66. As a result, the club enticed veteran post player Natalie Porter out of retirement to assist centre Marianna Tolo under the basket. Unfortunately the Capitals were unable to maintain consistency through the season, finishing 8th with a 9–13 record, missing the finals for the first time since 2004/05. After such a disappointing season, the theme of the Capitals' traditional "Mad Tuesday" costume party was "we're no good at basketball, so let's try different sports". Molly Lewis dressed as a Wests Tigers rugby player, Carly Wilson as a cheerleader, Jessica Bibby as a surfer, Michelle Coser as a Canberra Cavalry baseball player, coach Carrie Graf as a golfer, Hannah Bowley as a boxer, Marianna Tolo as a gymnast and Nicole Hunt as a Carlton Blues footballer.

=== 2012/13 season ===
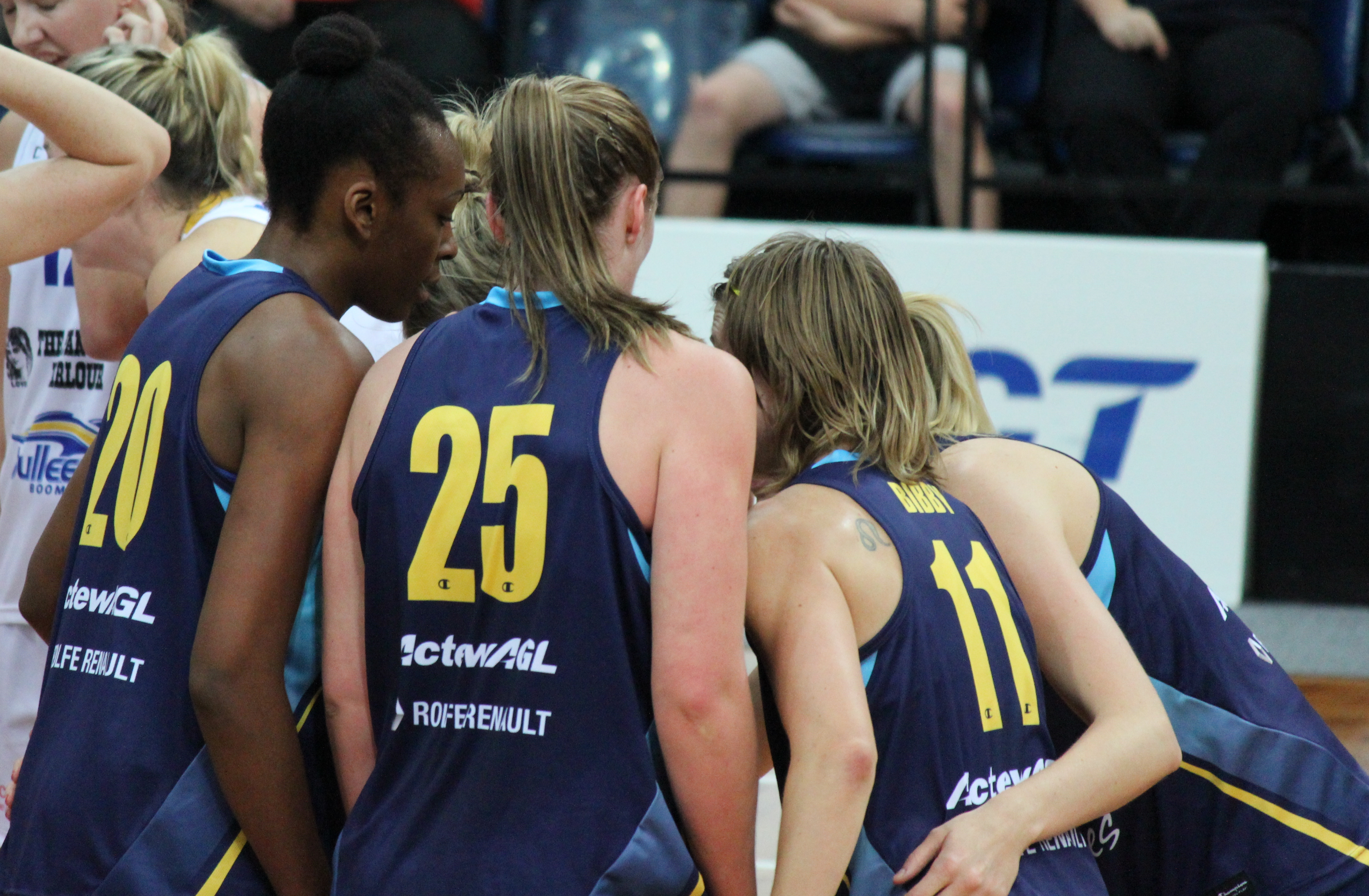
20 Val Ogoke, 25 Samantha Norwood, 11 Jessica Bibby and 8 Carly Wilson

At the beginning of the 2011/2012 season, it was announced that Lauren Jackson had signed a $1 million deal to re-join the team for 3 of the next 4 seasons starting in 2012/2013. However, hopes of a dominant front court pairing with Mariana Tolo escaped the Caps with Tolo signing a one-year deal with French club Aix-en-Provence. The club also welcomed forwards Samantha Norwood from the West Coast Waves and American import Valerie Ogoke from St Mary's Academy, California to fill out the front court alongside Jackson and Ardossi.

Unfortunately the 2012/13 season did not pan out as the Capitals would have hoped, as Jackson sat out the entire season with a chronic hamstring injury and the team slumped to finish second last on the table with a 7-17 W/L record, despite starting the season with a 5–3 run. The Capitals backcourt stars Carly Wilson and Jess Bibby struggled to find consistency at the offensive end, particularly during the middle of the season, with Wilson scoring 6.3 ppg at 34.6% and Bibby scoring 12.8 ppg at 36.8%. The front court battled on admirably without a veteran presence in the middle, clearly missing the size and experience of Jackson and the departed Tolo. Highlights for the season included forward Brigitte Ardossi winning the team's MVP award (despite being suspended for the last 3 games of the season) and the continued emergence of young local centre Alex Bunton. The team's inconsistent form was reflected in their wins against premiers Bendigo, fourth placed Townsville and last year's grand finalist Bulleen, alongside two losses to last placed West Coast. For the first time since 1998/99 the Capitals had missed the WNBL finals two seasons running.

Despite the turmoil of Jackson's injury and the indifferent form of the team late in the season, the Capitals were boosted by coach Carrie Graf choosing to stand down from the Opals head coaching role, committing to the club for another three seasons in February 2013.

=== 2013/14 season ===
After a difficult end to the 2012/13 season the Capitals began talks with Jackson to renegotiate her contract and play for the club in 2013/14 in lieu of 2015/16. Despite some interest from Jackson, the negotiations fell through and her contract to play for the Capitals through the 2014/15 and 2015/16 seasons remained unchanged. Despite this setback, Canberra continued to be active in the player market, luring back point guard Natalie Hurst from Europe on a one-year deal and forward Abby Bishop, who signed a multi-season deal to return to the Capitals for the 2013/14 and 2015/16 seasons. Bishop brought with her French guard Isabelle Strunc, a team-mate from the French WBL club Perpignan after that club collapsed from financial difficulties. The Caps also secured young centre Carley Mijovic from the Dandenong Rangers to support Alex Bunton in the middle. These signings were offset by the departure of forward Bridgette Ardossi and guard Mikaela Dombkins to Melbourne-based clubs, along with exciting young prospect, guard Casey Samuels who exited her 2-year deal with the Capitals to return home to Sydney. Swingman Michelle Cosier also sat out the season with the pregnancy of her second child. Despite a season from Abby Bishop worthy of an MVP nomination, finishing the year with 18.5 ppg (3rd in the league) and 10.35 rpg (2nd in the league), supported by solid performances from Mijovic (9.4 ppg) and Bibby (14.9 ppg), the Capitals struggled for consistency throughout the season. The team missed the finals for the third year running, finishing the season in equal 6th position, tied with Sydney on a 10-14 W/L record.

=== 2014/15 season ===
The 2014/15 season was another year of player turnover at the club. Young centres Carley Mijovic and Alex Bunton departed for Adelaide, Isabelle Strunc returned to France to play with Nice and Natalie Hurst returned to Hungary, signing a contract with PEAC Pecs. Returning to the club were veterans Lauren Jackson and Michelle Cosier, while point guard Kristen Veal pulled on a Capitals singlet for the first time since the 2005/06 season, after the Logan Thunder folded at the end of the 2013/14 season. The club also signed star Adelaide forward Stephanie Talbot, guard Hanna Zavecz from the Thunder and brought back forward Sam Norwood to help Jackson, Bishop and Talbot in the front court.

=== 2015/16 season ===
For the first time in eleven years, the Capitals had a new coach in Paul Goriss. Without Lauren Jackson and sufficient crowds to fill the AIS Arena after the dismal 2014/15 Season in which the Capitals won only two games out of 24 and finished ninth, the Capitals retreated back to their old home base, the tin shed with wooden benches that was the Southern Cross Stadium in Tuggeranong. The season saw considerable improvement, with the Capitals winning 13 games out of 24, but Round 19 loss to the Adelaide Lightning—the league's bottom-ranked side—ended hopes of the Capitals making the playoffs again, and they finished a disappointing fifth. Mikaela Ruef was the only player to average a double-double through the regular season, with 32.8 points and 19.5 rebounds per game. The season saw the return of Marianna Tolo, who was named the Capitals' MVP and the WNBL Defensive Player of the Year. Tolo led the league with 58 blocks for the season, averaged 5.5 defensive rebounds per game, and was ranked third in the league in points scored, averaging 18.1 per game, and rebounds, with 8.5 per game. At the other end of the court, Tolo shot 56% from the field and 85% from the free-throw line. An important acquisition was Keely Froling. The end of the season saw the retirement of Carly Wilson, who was seventh in the list of all-time WNBL games played, but not the last; she returned in 2017–18 as an assistant coach.

=== 2017/18 season ===
For the 2017/18 season, the Capitals moved from Tuggeranong to the air-conditioned and far more comfortable National Convention Centre Canberra, where a basketball court was constructed in the Royal Theatre for $250,000, split evenly between the ACT government and the University of Canberra, the team's major sponsor. Despite solid performances from captain Nat Hurst, Abbey Wehrung, who averaged 9.5 points per game, and Kate Gaze, who shot 35% from the three-point line for 7.4 points per game, the Capitals' court performance oscillated between disappointing and dismal. Following an opening round win that saw them briefly on top of the WNBL ladder, the Capitals went on a thirteen-game losing streak, missing the finals for the seventh year in a row, and finishing sixth.

=== 2018/19 season ===
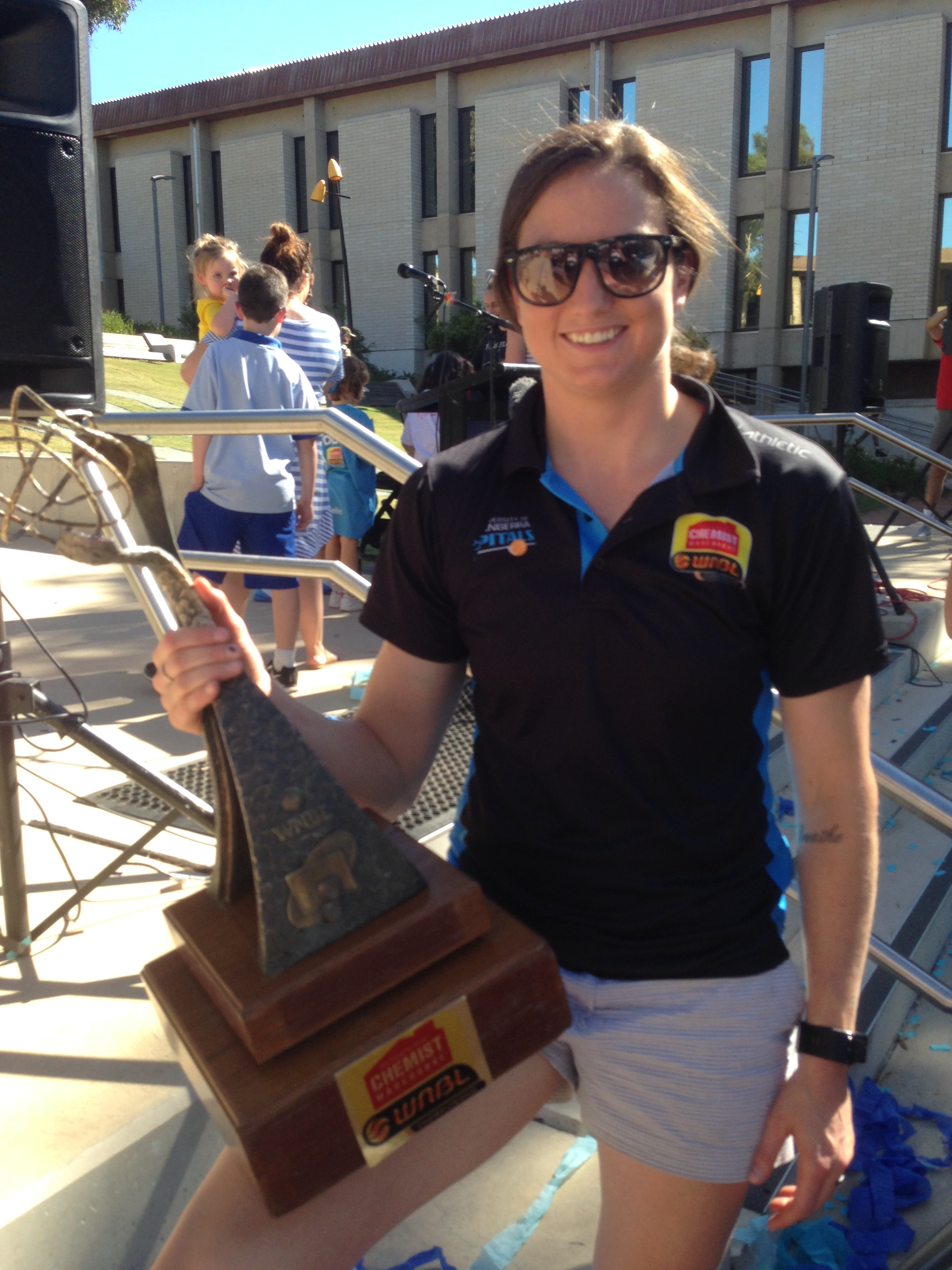
Kelsey Griffen holds the 2018/19 WNBL trophy

An intense recruiting effort saw the Capitals signing Kelly Wilson from Townsville, Kelsey Griffin from Bendigo, Kristy Wallace from the Baylor Lady Bears basketball, and Opals Marianna Tolo and Leilani Mitchell. Kia Nurse, a no. 10 draft pick in the WNBA and a two-time NCAA champion with the University of Connecticut was brought in from Canada. They joined Capitals Lauren Scherf, Keely Froling and Maddison Rocci. The team was impressive on paper, but were carrying a host of ailments: Griffin had played just six games in 2017/18 after surgery and hamstring problems; Mitchell had missed the 2018 FIBA Women's Basketball World Cup on account of a leg injury; and Tolo and Wallace had torn an ACL. Goriss retained Carly Wilson as an assistant coach. She was joined on the coaching bench by Phil Brown, a veteran development coach who helped over 30 players become Olympians, including Lauren Jackson, and Penny Taylor, and Bec Goddard, an Australian football coach who had led the Adelaide Crows to the AFLW premiership in 2017, but had returned to Canberra to coach the Canberra Demons in the NEAFL. The Capitals adopted the slogan: "Go Big".

Three straight wins at the start of the season aroused cautious hopes that "maybe, just maybe, this group can bring an eighth banner to Canberra." This was reflected in crowd sizes; 12,000 spectators went through the gates in their ten regular season home games, more than double the season before. The regular season ended with the Capitals winning nine games in a row, and the Capitals finished on top of the ladder. This became eleven when the Capitals notched up back-to-back semifinal wins against Perth. Some 4,120 fans packed the AIS Arena to watch the Capitals defeat Adelaide in the first game of the best-of-three Grand Final series, and then 4,817 for the third game after a controversial one-point loss to Adelaide to watch the Capitals post a 20-point win and claim an eighth premiership. Capitals captain Kelsey Griffin was awarded the Rachael Sporn medal for the best player in the grand final series for the third time, and was both the Capitals' and the WNBL's MVP. On International Women's Day 2019, the Capitals were named the 2019 Canberra Citizens of the Year.

=== 2019/20 season ===
First order of business for the 2019/20 season was re-signing Paul Goriss as coach. For assistant coaches he retained Carly Wilson, and recruited the 2019 Waratah League Women's Coach of The Year, Jenny Lonergan, and former capitals player Kristen Veal. Kelsey Griffin, Keely Froling and Kristy Wallace already had contracts in place, and the Capitals quickly moved to re-sign Mariana Tolo. Griffin and Tolo were named co-captains for the season. Griffin had suffered a broken plantar plate in the 2019 semi-final in January which precluded her playing for the Minnesota Lynx in the WNBA during the off season. Kia Nurse was re-signed, but her commitments with the New York Liberty in the WNBA and the Canadian national team meant she arrived back in Canberra just days before the start of round one. She went on to win player of the round nonetheless.

A major gap in the line up was caused by the departure of point guards Kelly Wilson and Leilani Mitchell. To replace them, the Capitals recruited French player Olivia Epoupa. and 20-year-olds Maddison Rocci and Abby Cubillo, They also signed 23-year-old Alex Delaney, and picked up 17-year-old Gemma Potter, who had played for the U17s Sapphires and U19s Gems national sides at the FIBA World Championships where she had won bronze and silver, 18-year-old BA Centre of Excellence rising star Lily Scanlon, and three development players: Shakera Reilly, Pyper Thornberry and Maddy Wheatley. Mikaela Ruef was signed as an additional forward, but she was still a US citizen; WNBL rules permitted only two foreign imports per team, and the Capitals already had two in Kia Nurse and Olivia Epoupa. Processing of her paperwork by the US and Australian immigration departments took longer than expected, and she missed the seven-game minimum required to be eligible to play in finals, and eventually departed for France without playing a single game.

The season opened with a grand final rematch against the Adelaide Lightning. In a sign of things to come, the Capitals fought back from a ten-point deficit to take the win. The season saw the Capitals struggle with a series of injuries; Kelsey Griffin was sidelined with an ankle injury after the losing round nine game against the Southside Flyers, requiring Keely Froling to step up, which she did, notching up a double-double and career-high of 30 points and 10 rebounds in the round 10 match against Benfigo Spirit. Bushfires in New South Wales caused the cancellation of the round twelve clash against Perth Lynx due to Canberra's poor air quality, prompting Nurse and Griffin to pledge $5 to bushfire relief for every point scored by the Capitals over the next five rounds.

In round fourteen, Froling had her nose and cheekbone broken by Melbourne Boomer Sophie Cunningham, but still played on, and scored the winning basket for the Capitals in extra time. During the semi-finals, Cunningham punched Froling in her broken nose, for which the WNBL Incident Review Panel fined Cunningham $250. Cunningham had already been fined $500 for a hit on Maddison Rocci in the January game, but the Incident Review Panel decision allowed Cunningham to play in the deciding semi-final against the Capitals. This could be compared with Paul Goriss's $2,500 in 2019 for criticising the referees, and Froling's $2,000 in medical bills. When Froling and Tolo took to Twitter to vent their anger at the decision, they were fined $250 as well. But the Capitals went on to win the deciding game of the semi-final series, 77–64.

The Capitals went on to win the first game of the Grand Final series by a slender two points, and then, in front of a home town crowd at the AIS arena, fought their way back from a ten-point deficit to claim their ninth WNBL title. Kia Nurse was named the winner of the Suzy Batkovic Medal for season MVP, the first time a foreign player had won. She was presented with the medal by Lauren Jackson before the first semi-final match. Paul Goriss was named league coach of the year, and Olivia Epoupa took out the Rachael Sporn medal for Grand Final MVP after notching up 16 points, 7 rebounds and 11 assists on the night.

=== 2020/21 to 2021/22 - COVID –19 Impacted Seasons ===
The impact of the COVID-19 pandemic meant that the entire 2020/21 WNBL season was condensed into a one-month period with each team relocating to a bubble in North Queensland. After a loss in overtime to the Adelaide Lightning in round one, the Capitals would go on a seven-game winning streak to lead the competition. Jade Melbourne debuted for the Capitals in round two of the competition, and immediately made an impact, averaging 15.3 points across her first three games.

The Capitals lost three of their last five games to slip to third on the ladder at the end of the regular season. Facing the Melbourne Boomers in the semifinals, the Caps started slow, trailing 20–32 at the conclusion of the 1st quarter. Despite putting up some fight, the deficit was too much, and the Caps would go down 68-78 ending their dreams of a three-peat. At the end of the season, the Capitals were awarded with the CBR Sport ‘Team of the Year Award’, which they shared with the ACT Brumbies. During the season, a camera crew followed the team for a film titled ‘Go Big: The Story of the Canberra Capitals’ which also covered the history of the franchise.

The Capitals signed import Brittany Sykes for the 2021/22 season in a major boost to the squad. However, the team also lost Keely Froling, Maddison Rocci and Marrianna Tolo in the off season. Sykes impressed in her first year with the club, averaging 16.1 ppg while Kelsey Griffin and Mikaela Ruef both had strong seasons. On March 8th, 2022, the Capitals announced that head coach Paul Gorris would depart the team at the end of the season to take up an opportunity with the Atlanta Dream in the WNBA.

The Capitals finished the season in third place, one win behind ladder leaders Melbourne to qualify for the finals. The Capitals faced Perth in a best of three series for a spot in the Grand Final Series. After losing the first game, eight members of the UC Capitals squad tested positive to the virus which forced a postponement of the 2nd match meaning the series would be decided over two games and points accumulated. The Capitals later withdrew from the competition before game two as the squad in its entirety was placed in isolation.

=== 2022/23 to 2023/24 Kirsten Veal era and Rebuild ===
Following the departure of Paul Gorris, three-time Capitals champion player Kristen Veal took over as the coach of the club. The Capitals entered a rebuild in this season, with numerous players departing the club including Mikaela Ruef, Abby Cubillo, Kelly Wilson, Gemma Potter and Brittany Sykes. Bolstering a team of young athletes, the Caps also brought in guard Nicole Munger as a replacement for Dekeiya Cohen who returned to the United States mid-season. The young Capitals had a tough season, winning just two of their twenty-one games. Jade Melbourne had another strong season personally, leading the league in assists. Despite the poor season results the Capitals enjoyed record crowds and a drastic climb in membership to boost the franchise off the court after a challenging time during the COVID-19 pandemic.

In March 2023, with an eye on the future the UC Capitals secured the signatures of Jade Melbourne and Nicole Munger. After six rounds the Capitals were struggling, having not recorded a win in the season. From there however, the Capitals enjoyed a brilliant stretch of games winning four of their next five matches with three of those coming against teams who eventually qualified for the playoffs. The Capitals fell away from here, failing to win another game for the remainder of the season.

Jade Melbourne featured for the Capitals, recording averages of 16.1 points, 5.1 rebounds and 7.6 assists per game which resulted in her being named the WNBL Fan MVP for the season. Her fellow Vice Captain Alex Sharp was named Breakout player of the season.

=== 2024/25 - Paul Gorris Returns ===
On the 22nd of February 2024, the Capitals announced that Kristen Veal had re-signed as head coach of the UC Capitals on a one-year contract. However, it was announced on June 14th that Veal would step down as head coach due to complications regarding her knee surgery, that hindered her ability to coach the team. Paul Gorris, who had been working as an assistant coach with the side, returned to the head coach position for the first time since the 2021/22 season.

Jade Melbourne re-signed with the club on July 2nd just prior to departing for the 2024 Paris Olympic Games where she was a part of the Opals squad that claimed a bronze medal. The Capitals recruitment continued to make moves in the offseason, securing the services of Nyadiew Puoch from the Southside Flyers as well as Ella Tofaeono and Indiah Bowyer from Townsville Fire. In addition, Katie Deeble and Monique Bobongie joined the club while in a major signing coup former WNBA Number One Draft pick Charli Collier agreed to a deal with the franchise. The organisation announced on July 16th that Alex Sharp would be taking up and opportunity overseas, thus leaving Canberra.

Early in the season the Capitals struggled for momentum, falling to a 2–10 record and languishing in 2nd last on the table. However, at the turn of the new year the Capitals form resurged. Two wins against Adelaide and one each against Geelong and Southside place the Capitals finals aspirations into their own hands.

The Capitals faced the Sydney Flames at the AIS arena in a game that shaped as critical to both side finals hopes. With scores level, and 1.6 seconds left, the Capitals inbounded with Nyadiew Puoch putting up a shot which narrowly missed, sending the game into overtime. The Flames ultimately won the contest 88–92, which meant the Caps needed to win every game for the remainder of the season to qualify for the playoffs. A win against Geelong two days after the Flames game gave the Capitals hope of a finals berth, however, those hopes were dashed after a frustrating loss to Sydney the following week.

In the final game of the year the Capitals secured a consolation victory over eventual champions the Bendigo Spirit. Jade Melbourne capped off another stellar season with 40 points in the game, while the team also farewelled Abby Bishop who officially retired after briefly returning to the side mid-season.

In the weeks following, the Capitals re-signed Paul Gorris as head coach, while Jade Melbourne also agreed to return to Canberra for 2025/26. Melbourne also was recognised as a member of the All WNBL 2nd Team in addition to being awarded the UC Capitals Most Valuable Player for the 3rd consecutive year.

== Players ==
=== Current roster ===
2026–27 Canberra Capitals roster
Players
Coaches

Pos.	No.	Nat.	Name	Ht.
G	0	(Australia)	Boutzos, Jasmyn (DP)	1.63 m (5 ft 4 in)
G	3	(Australia)	Funnell, Zara (DP)	1.76 m (5 ft 9 in)
G	4	(Australia)	Palmer, Isabel	1.78 m (5 ft 10 in)
G	8	(Australia)	Jones, Caitlyn	1.75 m (5 ft 9 in)
F	10	(United States)	Munger, Nicole (C, I)	1.80 m (5 ft 11 in)
F	11	(New Zealand)	Robati, Sharne	1.91 m (6 ft 3 in)
F	13	(Australia)	Puoch, Nyadiew	1.91 m (6 ft 3 in)
G	16	(United States)	McConnell, Megan (I)	1.70 m (5 ft 7 in)
G	24	(Australia)	Brancatisano, Isabella (C)	1.70 m (5 ft 7 in)
G	25	(Australia)	Atwell, Amy	1.83 m (6 ft 0 in)
C	32	(Australia)	Puoch, Manuela	1.85 m (6 ft 1 in)
C	45	(New Zealand)	Whittaker, Charlotte	1.90 m (6 ft 3 in)

Head coach

- (Australia) Paul Goriss

Assistant coach(es)

- (Australia) Natalie Hurst
- (Australia) Aidan Barnett
- (Australia) Abbie Ketels

Legend

- (C) Team captain
- (DP) Development player
- (I) Import player
- (NRP) Nominated replacement player
- Injured

- Roster
Updated: 17 October 2026

=== Former players ===
No.	Player	Position	Seasons Played	Notes
	Jenny Cheesman	Guard	1986–1989, 1991	Captained Australia at the 1984 and 1988 Olympic Games. Inducted into the Australian Basketball Hall of Fame in 2004. Named in the WNBL 25th Anniversary team in 2005. Number retired by the Capitals.
	Sue Geh	Centre	1986–1987	Played for Australia at the 1984 Olympic Games. Has a street named after her in the Canberra suburb of Nicholls.
5	Kristen Veal	Point Guard	1999/00-2003/04, 2014/15	Drafted by WNBA team Phoenix Mercury in 2001/02 becoming the youngest player to play in the WNBA.
10	Jenny Whittle	Centre	2004/05-2005/06	Played for Australia at the 1996 and 2000 Olympics. Played for Australia at the 1994, 1998, 2002 and 2006 World Championships.
11	Shelley Gorman	Guard	1988/89-2001/02	Played for Australia at the 1988, 1996 and 2000 Olympics. Named in the WNBL 25th Anniversary team in 2005.
15	Fiona Robinson	Forward	1996–1997	Represented Australia in Basketball at the 1996 Olympic Games and European Handball at the 2000 Olympic Games.
15	Lauren Jackson	Forward/Centre	1999/00-2003/04, 2005/06, 2009/10, 2014/15, 2015/16	Represented Australia at the 2000, 2004, 2008 and 2012 Olympic Games. WNBL MVP with the Capitals in 1999/00, 2002/03 and 2003/04. Multiple WNBA All Star appearances. Named in the WNBL 25th Anniversary team in 2005.
35	Alana Beard	Guard	2005/06	WNBA All Star Guard from the Washington Mystics.
44	Tully Bevilaqua	Point Guard	2004/05-2007/08	Represented Australia at the 2008 Olympics. Played in the WNBA with Cleveland, Portland, Seattle and Indiana. Had her number retired by the Canberra Capitals in 2008.

== Coaches and staff ==
=== Head coaches ===
The Capitals have had 11 head coaches since their WNBL inception in 1986:

Canberra Capitals head coaches
Name	Start	End	Seasons	Regular season				Finals			
Name	Start	End	Seasons	W	L	PCT	G	W	L	PCT	G
Ken Simpson	1987	1987	1	7	13	35.0	20	0	0	0.00	0
Dave Nelson	1988	1988	1	13	9	59.1	22	0	0	0.00	0
Guy Molloy	1989	1989	1	8	15	34.7	23	0	0	0.00	0
Tony McGee	1990	1990	1	5	19	20.8	24	0	0	0.0	0
Tad Dufelmeier Sr.	1993	1993	1	7	11	38.8	18	0	0	0.0	0
Jerry Lee ^{[a]}	1986	1994	4	39	27	59.1	66	0	1	0.00	1
Michelle Wall	1995	1996	2	13	23	36.1	36	0	0	0.0	0
Mike McHugh	1997	1999	3	10	39	20.4	49	0	0	0.0	0
Tom Maher ^{[b]}	2002	2005	2	25	17	59.5	42	2	0	100.0	2
Carrie Graf ^{[c]}	1999	2016	15	199	133	59.9	332	16	7	69.5	23
Paul Goriss^{[d]}	2016	Present	3	36	30	54.5	66	4	1	80.0	5
Kristen Veal	2022	2024	2	6	36	16.6	42	0	0	0.0	0

Notes

- ^{a} Across the years of 1986–1994, Jerry Lee coached four seasons (1986, 1991–1992, 1994)
- ^{b} Across the years of 2002–2005, Tom Maher coached two seasons (2002–03 & 2004–05)
- ^{c} Across the years of 1999–2016, Carrie Graf coached fifteen seasons (1999–2002, 2003–04, 2005–2016)
- ^{d} Across the years of 2016–Present, Paul Goriss coached seven seasons (2016–2022, 2024–Present)
- Win/Loss statistics stand as of the end of the 2023–24 WNBL season
