= Adrien Sturt =

Australian-British basketball player

Personal information
- Born: 2 May 1986 (age 40) Rose Park, South Australia, Australia
- Listed height: 209 cm (6 ft 10 in)
- Listed weight: 93 kg (205 lb)

Career information
- High school: Box Hill (Melbourne, Victoria)
- College: Snow College (2006–2007)
- Playing career: 2007–present
- Position: Centre

Career history
- 2007–2009: Melbourne Tigers
- 2007–2009: Melbourne Tigers
- 2010: Dexia Mons-Hainaut
- 2010–2011: Essex Pirates
- 2011: Eltham Wildcats
- 2011–2014: Milton Keynes/London Lions
- 2012: Ringwood Hawks
- 2013: Bulleen Boomers
- 2014–2015: Cheshire Phoenix
- 2015–2016: Plymouth Raiders
- 2018: Waverley Falcons
- 2019; 2021; 2023: Ringwood Hawks

Career highlights
- NBL champion (2008); 3× Big V champion (2008, 2009, 2012); 2× BBL All-Star (2013, 2014)

Adrien Richard Sturt (born 2 May 1986) is an Australian-British professional basketball player. He previously played for the Great Britain Under-23 team.

== High school and college ==
In 2004, Sturt played for Melbourne University in the VBL Premier Division (D1M), winning that year's championship under the leadership of head coach Dean Vickerman.

After graduating from Box Hill Senior Secondary College in 2006, Sturt attended Utah's Snow College in 2006–07 where he helped the team win the SWAC Conference Championship.

== Professional career ==
Sturt returned to Australia in 2007 and joined the Melbourne Tigers, where he played two seasons and won an NBL championship in his rookie season. He also played for the Tigers' affiliate team in the Big V, where he won championships in 2008 and 2009.

In April 2010, Sturt signed with Dexia Mons-Hainaut of Belgium for the rest of the 2009–10 season. Later that year, he signed with the Essex Pirates for the 2010–11 British Basketball League season. In 31 games for the Pirates, he averaged 10.9 points, 5.9 rebounds, 1.3 assists and 1.1 steals per game.

In March 2011, Sturt signed with the Eltham Wildcats for the 2011 Big V season.

Sturt moved to England for the 2011–12 season, signing with the Milton Keynes Lions of the British Basketball League. In 27 games for the Lions, he averaged 9.7 points, 5.8 rebounds and 1.4 assists per game. Following the BBL season, he returned to Australia and joined the Ringwood Hawks for the 2012 Big V season.

In August 2012, the Milton Keynes Lions moved to London and thus became the London Lions. Sturt subsequently joined the London Lions for the 2012–13 British Basketball League season. In 32 games for the Lions, he averaged 13.6 points, 6.4 rebounds, 1.2 assists and 1.4 blocks per game. Following the BBL season, he joined the Bulleen Boomers for the 2013 Big V season.

On 29 July 2013, Sturt re-signed with the London Lions for the 2013–14 British Basketball League season. In 34 games for the Lions, he averaged 10.8 points and 5.9 rebounds per game.

On 11 September 2014, Sturt again re-signed with the Lions for the 2014–15 British Basketball League season. On 18 November 2014, he was released by the Lions after appearing in the first six games of the season. Eight days later, he signed with the Cheshire Phoenix for the rest of the season. In 28 games for the Phoenix, he averaged 6.6 points and 5.1 rebounds per game.

On 9 November 2015, Sturt signed with the Plymouth Raiders for the rest of the 2015–16 British Basketball League season.

In 2018, Sturt joined the Waverley Falcons of the Big V.

In 2019, Sturt played for the Ringwood Hawks in the inaugural NBL1 season. He continued with Ringwood in the NBL1 in 2021 and 2023.
