= Rebecca Cole (basketball) =

Australian basketball player (born 1992)

No. 1 – Geelong Venom
- Position: Shooting guard
- League: WNBL

Personal information
- Born: 19 March 1992 (age 34) Melbourne, Victoria, Australia
- Listed height: 5 ft 10 in (1.78 m)

Career information
- High school: Caulfield Grammar
- Playing career: 2009–present

Career history
- 2009–2012: Australian Institute of Sport
- 2012–2018: Bulleen/Melbourne Boomers
- 2015–2016: Nunawading Spectres
- 2017: Eltham Wildcats
- 2018: Melbourne Tigers
- 2018–2025: Dandenong Rangers / Southside Flyers
- 2019: Dandenong Rangers (NBL1)
- 2021: Bulleen Boomers (Big V)
- 2022–2026: Waverley Falcons
- 2026–present: Geelong Venom

Career highlights
- 2× WNBL champion (2020, 2024); NBL1 National champion (2024); NBL1 National Finals Championship Game MVP (2024); NBL1 National Finals All-Star Five (2024); NBL1 South champion (2024); WNBL All-Star Five (2019)

Rebecca Joy Cole (born 19 March 1992) is an Australian professional basketball player for the Geelong Venom of the WNBL. She is a two-time champion with the Southside Flyers of the Women's National Basketball League (WNBL) and has been a member of the Australian Opals.

== Early life ==
Cole was born in Melbourne, Victoria, in the suburb of Mount Waverley. She attended secondary school at Caulfield Grammar School.

== Professional career ==
=== WNBL ===
Cole made her debut in the Women's National Basketball League (WNBL) with the Australian Institute of Sport (AIS) in the 2009–10 season at 16 years old. After three seasons with the AIS, she joined the Bulleen Boomers. She played for the Bulleen/Melbourne Boomers every year between 2012 and 2018. She was a member of the Boomers' grand final team in 2017–18.

For the 2018–19 season, Cole joined the Dandenong Rangers. She was named to the 2018–19 WNBL All-Star Five and was named the Rangers Club MVP. For the 2019–20 season, the Rangers rebranded as the Southside Flyers. Cole continued with the Flyers in 2019–20 and the 2020 WNBL Hub season in Queensland, helping the team win the Hub championship. They finished runners-up in 2022–23 and won the WNBL championship in 2023–24. She returned to Southside for the 2024–25 WNBL season. She parted ways with the Flyers in August 2025.

On April 22nd, the Geelong Venom announced that Cole would be joining the team on a two-year deal, for the 2026-27 and 2027-28 WNBL seasons. Cole was recruited to the club by her former coach at Southside, Cheryl Chambers.

=== State Leagues ===
In 2015 and 2016, Cole played for the Nunawading Spectres in the South East Australian Basketball League (SEABL). She played for the Eltham Wildcats in the Big V in 2017 and the Melbourne Tigers in the SEABL in 2018.

In 2019, Cole joined the Dandenong Rangers for the inaugural NBL1 season. In 2021, she played for the Bulleen Boomers in the Big V. She joined the Waverley Falcons of the NBL1 South in 2022 and in 2024 helped the team win the NBL1 South championship. She went on to lead the Falcons to the NBL1 National championship at the 2024 NBL1 National Finals while earning MVP of the championship game. She was also named to the NBL1 National Finals All-Star Five.

Cole re-joined the Waverley Falcons for the 2025 NBL1 South season. She was named NBL1 South All Second Team. She re-joined the Falcons for the 2026 season.

== National team career ==
=== 5x5 ===
Cole made her international debut with the Under-19 program in 2011. She was chosen as captain for the Australian Gems (Australia's Under 19 Women's Team) at the FIBA Under-19 World Championship in Chile, where Australia narrowly missed out on bronze, placing fourth. She played all eight games.

In January 2019, it was announced that Cole was part of the 2019 Opals squad.

=== 3x3 ===
Cole was a member of both the 2018 and 2019 Australian teams in the FIBA 3x3 Asia Cup. In 2018, Australia won bronze and in 2019 Australia went undefeated winning the gold medal, with Cole being named the MVP of the 2019 tournament. FIBA named Cole one of the "10 Women Who Defined 3x3 in 2019".

== Personal life ==
Cole is the daughter of Gary and Ros Cole and has two older sisters, Jessica and Emma.

As of 2022, Cole is the Ambassador for Lymphoma Australia.
