= Orla O'Reilly =

Irish basketball player

No. 4 – Waverley Falcons
- Position: Guard
- League: NBL1 South

Personal information
- Born: 28 February 1990 (age 35); Cork, Ireland
- Listed height: 182 cm (6 ft 0 in)

Career information
- College: Binghamton (2008–2012)
- WNBA draft: 2012: undrafted
- Playing career: 2012–present

Career history
- 2012–2013: BK Lokomotiva Karlovy Vary
- 2013–2014: C.B. Bembibre PDM
- 2014–2016: Embutidos Pajariel Bembibre PDM
- 2017–2019; 2021: Sunbury Jets
- 2018–2019: KR
- 2022; 2024–: Waverley Falcons

Career highlights
- NBL1 South champion (2024); 2× Big V champion (2017, 2018)

Orla O'Reilly (born 28 February 1990) is an Irish professional basketball player and a member of the Irish national basketball team.

== College career ==
O'Reilly played college basketball for Binghamton University from 2008 to 2012.

== Professional career ==
After graduating from college, O'Reilly played for BK Lokomotiva Karlovy Vary of the Czech Women's Basketball League in the 2012–13 season. Her season ended early however due to a meniscus injury to her knee.

For the 2013–14 season, O'Reilly joined C.B. Bembibre PDM of the Liga Femenina de Baloncesto. She continued in Spain in 2014–15 and 2015–16 with Embutidos Pajariel Bembibre PDM. She returned to Embutidos Pajariel Bembibre in 2016-17 but left in November 2016.

In 2017, O'Reilly joined the Sunbury Jets of the Big V in Australia. She continued with Sunbury in 2018.

For the 2018–19 season, O'Reilly joined KR of the Icelandic Úrvalsdeild kvenna, where she averaged 19.1 points and 8.9 rebounds per game.

O'Reilly returned to the Sunbury Jets in 2019 and played for them again in 2021.

In 2022, O'Reilly played for the Waverley Falcons of the NBL1 South. She returned to Waverley in 2024 and helped them win the NBL1 South championship.

== Personal life ==
O'Reilly's older brothers, Colin O'Reilly and Niall O'Reilly, both played professional basketball. Her twin sister, Sinead, was her teammate at Binghamton University.
