= Dexter Kernich-Drew =

Australian basketball player (born 1991)

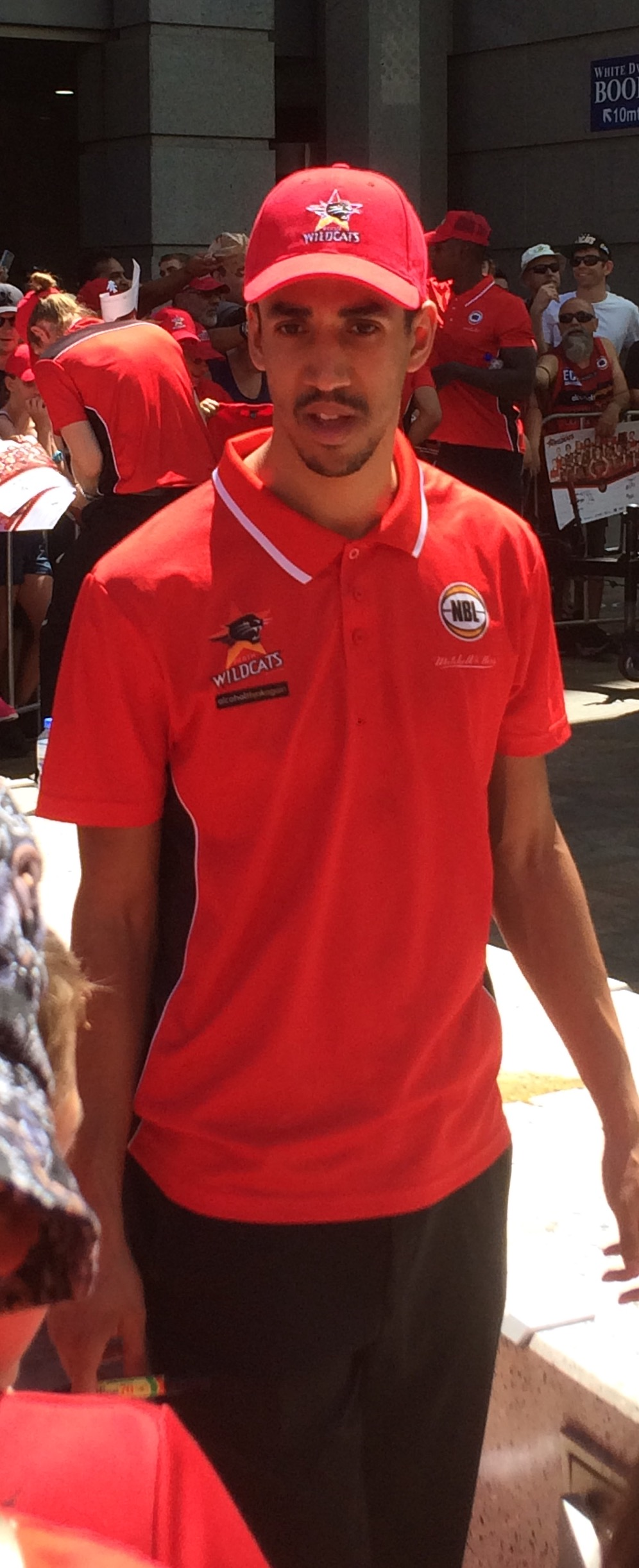
- Kernich-Drew in March 2017

Personal information
- Born: 16 October 1991 (age 35) Melbourne, Victoria, Australia
- Listed height: 198 cm (6 ft 6 in)
- Listed weight: 85 kg (187 lb)

Career information
- High school: Caulfield Grammar School (Melbourne, Victoria)
- College: Washington State (2011–2015)
- NBA draft: 2015: undrafted
- Playing career: 2015–present
- Position: Guard

Career history
- 2015: Melbourne Tigers
- 2015: Minas
- 2015–2018: Perth Wildcats
- 2016: Waverley Falcons
- 2017–2018: Rockingham Flames
- 2018: Melbourne Tigers
- 2018–2019: Cairns Taipans
- 2019: Dandenong Rangers
- 2021: Sydney Kings
- 2021–2024: Waverley Falcons

Career highlights
- 2× NBL champion (2016, 2017)

Dexter Grant Kernich-Drew (born 16 October 1991) is an Australian professional basketball player who last played for the Waverley Falcons of the NBL1 South. He played college basketball for Washington State before beginning a career in the National Basketball League.

== Early life and career ==
Kernich-Drew was born in Melbourne, Victoria. He attended Caulfield Grammar School, where he competed in basketball, volleyball and track and field. He led the school's basketball team to the 2008 McDonald's Cup Senior Boys State Championship, where he was named the tournament MVP. Caulfield went on to capture the National School Basketball Tournament (NSBT) Championship, defeating Mountain Creek State High School.

In 2009, Kernich-Drew played for the Waverley Falcons in the Big V Youth League Division 1. In 15 games for Waverley during the year, he averaged 23.3 points, 7.3 rebounds, 3.2 assists and 1.1 steals per game. He was subsequently named Player of the Year. He also played for Waverley the following year in the same league, averaging 24.8 points, 4.8 rebounds, 3.1 assists and 1.2 steals in 12 games.

== College career ==
In May 2010, Kernich-Drew signed a Financial Aid Agreement with Washington State University in order to join the school's men's basketball team for the 2010–11 season. However, he ultimately redshirted the 2010–11 season and joined the Cougars for the 2011–12 season as a freshman.

In his freshman season, Kernich-Drew appeared in 30 of the team's 37 games, while earning one starting assignment and averaging 2.3 points per game. He recorded career highs with 10 points and five rebounds in 22 minutes against Eastern Washington on 3 December 2011.

As a sophomore in 2012–13, Kernich-Drew played in 32 games for the Cougars, including 14 starts. He averaged 23.3 minutes, 6.4 points and 2.4 rebounds per game. He scored a career-high 16 points against Texas A&M on 20 November 2012, and played a career-high 39 minutes at home against UCLA on 6 March 2013. In the UCLA contest, he led the Cougars with a career-high 11 rebounds and scored 11 points for his only double-double of the season.

As a junior in 2013–14, Kernich-Drew appeared in 30 games for the Cougars, notching 21 starts. He averaged 22.2 minutes, 6.3 points, 0.8 assists, and 1.7 rebounds per game, and scored in double digits six times. He scored a season high and career-best 24 points against Colorado on 8 January 2014 after missing his only game of the season a week earlier due to a concussion.

As a senior in 2014–15, Kernich-Drew played in all 31 games for the Cougars, notching 12 starts. He averaged 18.9 minutes, 6.6 points, 1.6 rebounds, and 0.6 assists per game. He came on strong at the end of the season and ranked sixth in the Pac-12 with a .433 (42-for-97) three-point clip. He had a career-high 27 points in WSU's win over Arizona State at home on 13 February 2015, and scored 20 points and tied his career high with six three-pointers at home against Arizona two days later.

In 123 games for the Cougars over four seasons, Kernich-Drew averaged 5.4 points and 1.6 rebounds in 18.3 minutes per game.

== Professional career ==
After graduating from Washington State University, Kernich-Drew returned to Australia and played for the Melbourne Tigers in the 2015 Big V season, averaging 22.9 points, 5.2 rebounds, 1.8 assists and 1.0 steals in nine games.

After a brief stint in Brazil with Minas, Kernich-Drew joined the Perth Wildcats of the National Basketball League as a training player in November 2015. He was touted as a possible injury-replacement player for Damian Martin and was ultimately a member of the Wildcats' 2015–16 championship-winning squad.

Kernich-Drew joined the Waverley Falcons for the 2016 Big V season. He was named a finalist for the Defensive Player of the Year award. In 21 games, he averaged 15.6 points, 3.2 rebounds and 1.5 assists per game.

On 29 July 2016, Kernich-Drew signed a two-year deal with the Perth Wildcats. On 28 October 2016, he had 14 points in an 81–76 loss to the Illawarra Hawks. On New Year's Eve also against the Hawks, Kernich-Drew had eight of his 13 points in the final quarter to help lead the Wildcats to a 95–87 win. The Wildcats went on to defeat the Hawks 3–0 in the NBL Grand Final series to win the 2016–17 championship. For the season, he averaged 2.3 points in 29 games.

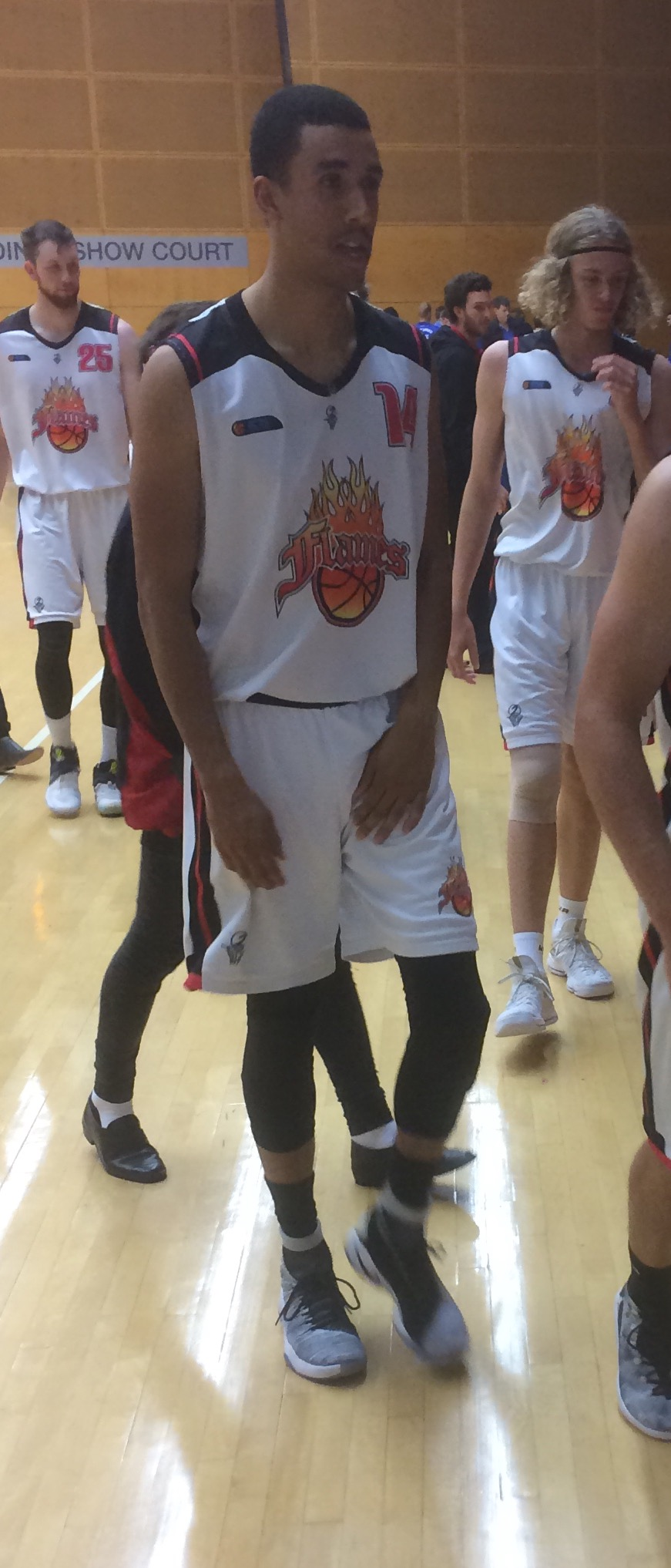
Kernich-Drew with the Flames in May 2017

On 9 May 2017, Kernich-Drew signed with the Rockingham Flames of the State Basketball League for the rest of the 2017 season. On 8 July, he had 38 points in a 105–103 win over the East Perth Eagles. On 17 July, he was ruled out for the rest of the SBL season after suffering a broken jaw against the Perry Lakes Hawks three days earlier. In 10 games for the Flames, he averaged 21.0 points, 5.2 rebounds and 2.5 assists per game.

In the Wildcats' second game of the 2017–18 NBL season on 13 October, Kernich-Drew had 11 points in a 74–64 win over the Illawarra Hawks. For the season, he averaged 2.2 points in 21 games.

After a one-game stint with the Rockingham Flames, Kernich-Drew joined the Melbourne Tigers for the 2018 SEABL season. In 11 games, he averaged 22.6 points, 4.3 rebounds and 4.0 assists per game.

On 9 May 2018, Kernich-Drew signed with the Cairns Taipans for the 2018–19 NBL season. On 13 December 2018, he was ruled out for six weeks after being diagnosed with multiple undisplaced fractures around his eye socket and cheekbone. For the season, he averaged 3.3 points and 1.5 rebounds in 18 games.

In March 2019, Kernich-Drew signed with the Dandenong Rangers of the NBL1 for the league's inaugural season. In 15 games, he averaged 17.6 points, 2.8 rebounds, 2.0 assists and 1.1 steals per game.

After spending time with Melbourne United early in the 2019–20 NBL season as an injury replacement for David Barlow, Kernich-Drew was set to play for the Geelong Supercats in the 2020 NBL1 season but the season was cancelled due to the COVID-19 pandemic.

On 5 February 2021, Kernich-Drew signed with the Sydney Kings as an injury replacement for Angus Glover. He appeared in eight games during the 2020–21 NBL season.

In April 2021, Kernich-Drew joined the Waverley Falcons of the NBL1 South. He averaged 16.2 points, 4.5 assists and 3.7 rebounds per game in 2022. He re-joined the Falcons in 2023. With the Falcons in 2024, he averaged 9.2 points in 19 games.

== Personal ==
Kernich-Drew is the son of Maurice and Margaret, and has a younger sister, Marli.
