= Daniel Dillon (basketball) =

Australian basketball player (born 1986)

Personal information
- Born: 19 March 1986 (age 40) Melbourne, Victoria, Australia
- Listed height: 193 cm (6 ft 4 in)
- Listed weight: 91 kg (201 lb)

Career information
- High school: North Laurel (London, Kentucky)
- College: Arizona (2004–2008)
- NBA draft: 2008: undrafted
- Playing career: 2008–2022
- Position: Point guard / shooting guard

Career history
- 2008–2009: South Dragons
- 2009–2010: Sandringham Sabres
- 2010–2011: Cairns Taipans
- 2011–2012: Waverley Falcons
- 2011–2012: Melbourne Tigers
- 2012–2015: CSM U Oradea
- 2015–2016: PGE Turów Zgorzelec
- 2016–2017: Hiroshima Dragonflies
- 2017: Kilsyth Cobras
- 2018: Waverley Falcons
- 2018–2019: Paris Basketball
- 2019–2021: Adelaide 36ers
- 2020: Polpharma Starogard Gdański
- 2021–2022: Waverley Falcons

Career highlights
- 2× NBL champion (2009, 2018); Big V champion (2011); 2× Liga Națională All-Star (2014, 2015); SEABL South Youth Player of the Year (2009)

Daniel James Dillon (born 19 March 1986) is an Australian former professional basketball player. He played college basketball for the Arizona Wildcats before playing professionally in Australia, Romania, Poland, Japan, and France.

== Early life ==
Dillon was born in Melbourne, Victoria. He grew up in the Melbourne suburb of Hampton. In 2003, he moved to the United States to attend North Laurel High School in London, Kentucky. He averaged 23 points, 10 rebounds and six assists per game for the school's basketball team.

== College career ==
Dillon had a four-year college basketball career with the Arizona Wildcats under coach Lute Olson from 2004 to 2008. He played sparingly for the Wildcats, averaging 1.6 points and 10.5 minutes in 113 career games with six starts. As a senior in 2007–08, he averaged 2.0 points, 1.3 assists and 14.4 minutes in 30 games with five starts.

== Professional career ==
After a brief stint with the Milwaukee Bucks in the NBA Summer League, Dillon returned to Australia and joined the South Dragons as a development player for the 2008–09 NBL season. The Dragons went on to win the 2008–09 NBL championship. In 12 games, Dillon averaged 1.8 points per game.

Following the NBL season, Dillon joined the Sandringham Sabres for the 2009 South East Australian Basketball League (SEABL) season. He was named the 2009 SEABL South Men Australian Youth Player of the Year.

In February 2010, Dillon travelled with a SEABL Select Team to Doha to play the Qatar national team in a two-game friendly series. He then returned to the Sabres for the 2010 SEABL season.

Dillon joined the Cairns Taipans for the 2010–11 NBL season. He helped the Taipans reach the NBL Grand Final series, where they were defeated 2–1 by the New Zealand Breakers.

After helping the Waverley Falcons win the championship in the Big V in 2011, Dillon joined the Melbourne Tigers for the 2011–12 NBL season. He left the Tigers after one season and reportedly agreed to join the Gold Coast Blaze for the 2012–13 season before the club folded.

After another stint with the Waverley Falcons in the Big V, Dillon moved to Romania to play for CSM Oradea in the 2012–13 season. He played three seasons for Oradea.

For the 2015–16 season, Dillon joined PGE Turów Zgorzelec of the Polish Basketball League. He moved to Japan for the 2016–17 season, joining Hiroshima Dragonflies of the B.League.

In June 2017, Dillon joined the Kilsyth Cobras of the SEABL. He suffered an Achilles injury playing for Kilsyth and was ruled out for six to eight months. He had signed with Melbourne United, but subsequently missed the entire 2017–18 NBL season. Melbourne went on to win the 2017–18 NBL championship.

After a season with the Waverley Falcons in the Big V, Dillon moved to France to play for Paris Basketball of the LNB Pro B in the 2018–19 season.

Dillon joined the Adelaide 36ers for the 2019–20 NBL season. Following the NBL season, he had a short stint in Poland with Polpharma Starogard Gdański to finish the 2019–20 PLK season.

Dillon returned to the 36ers for the 2020–21 NBL season.

In 2021 and 2022, Dillon played for the Waverley Falcons in the NBL1 South.

== Career statistics ==
Legend
GP	Games played	GS	Games started	MPG	Minutes per game
FG%	Field goal percentage	3P%	3-point field goal percentage	FT%	Free throw percentage
RPG	Rebounds per game	APG	Assists per game	SPG	Steals per game
BPG	Blocks per game	PPG	Points per game	**Bold**	Career high

=== College ===
Year	Team	GP	GS	MPG	FG%	3P%	FT%	RPG	APG	SPG	BPG	PPG
2004–05	Arizona	23	0	5.1	**.444**	**.400**	.500	.6	.4	.2	.0	1.0
2005–06	Arizona	**31**	1	10.4	.326	.269	**.714**	.9	.5	**.4**	**.1**	1.5
2006–07	Arizona	29	0	11.0	.400	.346	.478	.9	.8	.3	.0	1.9
2007–08	Arizona	30	**5**	**14.4**	.327	.355	.889	**1.1**	**1.3**	**.4**	.0	**2.0**
Career		113	6	10.5	.361	.333	.651	.9	.8	.3	.9	1.6
