= Owen Foxwell =

Australian basketball player (born 2003)

No. 15 – Wisconsin Badgers
- Position: Point guard
- League: Big Ten Conference

Personal information
- Born: 17 August 2003 (age 23)
- Listed height: 188 cm (6 ft 2 in)
- Listed weight: 87 kg (192 lb)

Career information
- College: Wisconsin (2026–present)
- Playing career: 2021–present

Career history
- 2021–2026: South East Melbourne Phoenix
- 2022–2024: Eltham Wildcats
- 2025: Taranaki Airs

Career highlights
- NBL1 South champion (2024); NZNBL assist champion (2025); NBL1 South Youth Player of the Year (2022)
Medals
Men's basketball
Representing Australia
FIBA Asia Cup
Gold medal – first place	2025 Saudi Arabia

Owen Stephen Foxwell (born 17 August 2003) is an Australian college basketball player for the Wisconsin Badgers of the Big Ten Conference. Foxwell formerly played professionally for the South East Melbourne Phoenix of the National Basketball League (NBL) and has also represented the Australia men's national basketball team, most notably being a part of the gold medal-winning team at the 2025 FIBA Asia Cup. Standing at 6-foot-2-inch (1.88 m), Foxwell plays the point guard position.

== Early life ==
Foxwell grew up in Bulleen, a suburb in Melbourne, Victoria. He played as a junior for the Bulleen Boomers.

== Professional career ==
Foxwell joined the South East Melbourne Phoenix of the National Basketball League (NBL) as a development player for the 2021–22 season. He appeared in four games in his first season. He joined the Eltham Wildcats of the NBL1 South for the 2022 season. As an 18-year-old, he averaged 14.9 points, 3.7 rebounds and 3.0 assists per game, subsequently earning NBL1 South Youth Player of the Year.

Foxwell returned to the Phoenix as a development player for the 2022–23 NBL season. He experienced a breakout campaign, where he took part in 16 games and finished among the top 20 players in the competition for steals with an average of 1.3 per game. He also averaged over three points, one assist and one rebound per game. He returned to the Eltham Wildcats for the 2023 NBL1 South season, where he averaged 18.6 points, 5.2 assists and 4.2 rebounds per game.

In March 2023, Foxwell re-signed with the Phoenix on a two-year deal, joining the full roster. In the 2023–24 NBL season, he averaged 4.3 points, 1.3 rebounds, and 1.2 assists in 11.5 minutes per game over 24 outings. He was named the Phoenix's Community Player of the Year. He returned to the Eltham Wildcats for the 2024 NBL1 South season, where he helped them win the NBL1 South championship.

Foxwell entered the 2024–25 NBL season as the Phoenix's second-longest tenured player. He averaged 8.1 points, 1.8 rebounds, and 2.6 assists per game across 33 games. In January 2025, Foxwell described himself as playing the best basketball of his career under new head coach Josh King, particularly emphasizing his defensive impact and improved role on the team. That month, he re-signed with the Phoenix on a new two-year deal. He emerged in the finals as one of the most impactful young players, posting strong performances off the bench with efficient shooting in a three-game series against the Illawarra Hawks. He was the recipient of the Phoenix's inaugural Clubman Award.

Foxwell joined the Taranaki Airs of the New Zealand National Basketball League (NZNBL) for the 2025 season. He was contracted for the full season, but left in June to attend the Adidas EuroCamp. He was named the NZNBL assist champion for his 8.0 assists per game.

Foxwell was handed the starting point guard role by Phoenix coach Josh King for the 2025–26 NBL season. He cemented his place in the Phoenix's starting lineup and had career-best campaign, averaging 11.1 points, three rebounds and 4.5 assists per game and finishing third in the NBL Next Generation Award.

== College career ==
On 23 February 2026, Foxwell announced he had committed to play college basketball for LSU. However, after LSU fired Matt McMahon and re-hired Will Wade, Foxwell flipped his committed in early April to play for Wisconsin. It will reunite him with his longtime friend and former Phoenix teammate Austin Rapp. Foxwell officially signed on 21 April.

== National team ==
Foxwell made his debut for the Australia men's national basketball team at the 2025 FIBA Asia Cup, averaging 7.8 points in six games. He helped the Boomers win the gold medal.

In October 2025, Foxwell was named in the Boomers squad for the first window of the FIBA Basketball World Cup 2027 Asian Qualifiers. He was later replaced in the squad by Ben Ayre.

== Personal life ==
Foxwell's father, Steve, played in the South East Australian Basketball League (SEABL). He has two younger brothers, Joel and Austin, who are also basketball players. Joel played for Melbourne United as a development player during the 2024–25 season. Austin joined Foxwell on the Phoenix by signing as a development player in 2025.
