= Funda Nakkaşoğlu =

Australian-Turkish basketball player

No. 3 – Sandringham Sabres
- Position: Guard
- League: NBL1 South

Personal information
- Born: 22 September 1995 (age 31) Melbourne, Victoria, Australia
- Listed height: 5 ft 8 in (1.73 m)

Career information
- High school: St Leonard's (Melbourne, Victoria)
- College: Utah State (2014–2016); Florida (2017–2019)
- WNBA draft: 2019: undrafted
- Playing career: 2012–present

Career history
- 2012–2014: Bulleen/Melbourne Boomers (WNBL)
- 2013–2014: Bulleen Boomers (Big V)
- 2019–2020: Galatasaray S.K.
- 2020–2022: Sydney Uni Flames
- 2021: Ringwood Hawks
- 2022–present: Sandringham Sabres

Career highlights
- All-MWC Team (2016); MWC Freshman of the Year (2015); MWC All-Freshman Team (2015)

Funda Nakkaşoğlu (born 22 September 1995) is an Australian-Turkish basketball player for the Sandringham Sabres of the NBL1 South. She played college basketball for the Utah State Aggies and Florida Gators, and has previously played in the Women's National Basketball League (WNBL) for the Bulleen Boomers and Sydney Uni Flames.

== Early life and career ==
Nakkaşoğlu was born and bred in Melbourne, Australia. She grew up with a father who played basketball and a mother who played volleyball. Nakkaşoğlu graduated from St Leonard's in Melbourne.

Nakkaşoğlu debuted in the Women's National Basketball League (WNBL) with the Bulleen Boomers during the 2012–13 season. In 10 games, she averaged 2.5 points and 1.0 assists per game. She joined the Bulleen Boomers Big V team for the 2013 Big V season, averaging 14.5 points, 3.1 rebounds and 2.4 assists in 18 games.

Nakkaşoğlu continued with the Boomers' WNBL team, now known as the Melbourne Boomers, in 2013–14 but she did not play. She returned to the Boomers' Big V team for the 2014 season and averaged 20.2 points, 4.3 rebounds, 2.3 assists and 1.6 steals in 17 games.

== College career ==
Nakkaşoğlu moved to the United States in 2014 to play college basketball for the Utah State Aggies. She was the Mountain West Conference's leading scorer in the 2015–16 season, averaging 20.8 points per game. She ranked 21st in the country in scoring and was named to the All-Mountain West first team.

After two seasons with the Aggies, Nakkaşoğlu transferred to the Florida Gators. She sat out the 2016–17 season due to NCAA transfer regulations and then played two seasons for the Gators between 2017 and 2019, finishing her collegiate career with 2,047 points (1,149 with Utah State and 898 with Florida).

== Professional career ==
In August 2019, Nakkaşoğlu signed with Galatasaray S.K. of the Turkish Super League. In nine games during the 2019–20 season, she averaged 4.7 points, 1.3 rebounds and 1.4 assists per game. She also appeared in two EuroCup games.

In July 2020, Nakkaşoğlu signed with the Sydney Uni Flames. In 12 games for the Flames during the 2020 WNBL Hub season in Queensland, she averaged 8.3 points and 1.0 rebounds per game.

Nakkaşoğlu joined the Ringwood Hawks of the NBL1 South for the 2021 NBL1 season. In 12 games, she averaged 19.2 points, 3.5 rebounds, 2.8 assists and 1.0 steals per game.

Nakkaşoğlu re-joined the Sydney Uni Flames for the 2021–22 WNBL season. In 13 games, she averaged 7.2 points, 1.6 rebounds and 1.4 assists per game.

Nakkaşoğlu joined the Sandringham Sabres for the 2022 NBL1 South season. In 19 games, she averaged 18.8 points, 2.6 rebounds and 1.3 assists per game. With the Sabres in the 2023 season, she averaged 18.7 points, 2.4 rebounds, 2.1 assists and 1.3 steals in 19 games. With the Sabres in the 2024 season, she averaged 21.2 points, 3.3 rebounds and 2.2 assists in 10 games, missing the end of the season with an injury. With the Sabres in the 2025 season, she averaged 20.5 points, 2.5 rebounds and 2.5 assists in 17 games. She re-signed with the Sabres for the 2026 season.

== National team ==
In 2016, Nakkaşoğlu was selected to the extended Turkish national team squad for a pre-tournament camp ahead of the Rio Olympics. In 2018, she participated in a multiphase selection camp for the Turkish national team.

== Personal life ==
Nakkaşoğlu's father is from Turkey and she subsequently holds both Australian and Turkish passports.
