= Dane Pineau =

Australian basketball player

No. 22 – Sandringham Sabres
- Position: Center
- League: NBL1 South

Personal information
- Born: 2 August 1994 (age 32) Melbourne, Victoria, Australia
- Listed height: 206 cm (6 ft 9 in)
- Listed weight: 103 kg (227 lb)

Career information
- High school: Melbourne Grammar School (Melbourne, Victoria)
- College: Saint Mary's (2013-2017)
- NBA draft: 2017: undrafted
- Playing career: 2011–2025

Career history
- 2011–2012: Melbourne Tigers
- 2017–2019: Sydney Kings
- 2018: Kilsyth Cobras
- 2019: Melbourne Tigers
- 2019–2023: South East Melbourne Phoenix
- 2022: Diamond Valley Eagles
- 2023–present: Sandringham Sabres
- 2023–2025: New Zealand Breakers

Career highlights
- NBL1 South champion (2025); NBL1 All-Star Five (2019); NBL1 Defensive Player of the Year (2019)

Dane Luke Pineau (born 2 August 1994) is an Australian basketball player for the Sandringham Sabres of the NBL1 South. He previously played eight seasons in the National Basketball League (NBL). He played college basketball in the United States for the Saint Mary's Gaels before debuting in the NBL in 2017 with the Sydney Kings. He went on to also play for the South East Melbourne Phoenix and New Zealand Breakers.

== Early life ==
Pineau was born in Melbourne, Victoria, in the suburb of Fitzroy. He graduated from Melbourne Grammar School in 2013.

In 2011, Pineau had a one-game stint in the Big V for the Melbourne Tigers. In 2012, he played 13 games for the Tigers in the Big V, averaging 11.5 points, 7.1 rebounds, 1.5 assists and 1.2 steals per game.

== College career ==
Pineau four years of college basketball in the United States for the Saint Mary's Gaels between 2013 and 2017. As a freshman in 2013–14, he appeared in 27 games and made two starts, averaging 1.9 points and 1.4 rebounds per game. As a sophomore in 2014–15, he appeared in all 31 games and started five during the season, averaging 3.8 points and 3.7 rebounds in 14.3 minutes per game.

As a junior in 2015–16, Pineau started all 35 games and averaged 11.3 points and a team-high 8.1 rebounds per game.

As a senior in 2016–17, Pineau played in 33 of the 34 games after a minor injury before the start of the season. He helped the Gaels reach the second round of the NCAA Tournament as a reliable sixth-man, averaging 6.6 points and 6.1 rebounds per game while shooting an efficient 61% from the field. Saint Mary's finished with a 29–5 record for the season.

Pineau finished as Saint Mary's all-time leader in field goal percentage, connecting on nearly 62% of his attempts.

== Professional career ==
=== NBL ===
In April 2017, Pineau signed with the Sydney Kings of the National Basketball League (NBL). He played limited minutes in his two seasons for the Kings.

In April 2019, Pineau signed with the South East Melbourne Phoenix for their inaugural season in the NBL in 2019–20. He appeared in only one game in 2020–21 due to a back injury. He required three-nerve root injections, a cortisone injection and two epidural injections to push through the pain. He returned in 2021–22 and played his 100th NBL game in April 2022. He played his fourth season for the Phoenix in 2022–23.

On 20 June 2023, Pineau signed a two-year deal with the New Zealand Breakers. Pineau endured injuries in the 2024–25 NBL season. He made his return from a meniscus tear for the Breakers' final game of the season on 5 February 2025 against the Illawarra Hawks. He announced his retirement from the NBL following the game.

=== State leagues ===
In 2018, Pineau played for the Kilsyth Cobras in the South East Australian Basketball League. He joined the Melbourne Tigers of the NBL1 for the league's inaugural season in 2019. He was named to the NBL1 All-Star Five and the NBL1 Defensive Player of the Year.

In 2022, Pineau played for the Diamond Valley Eagles in the NBL1 South. He continued in the NBL1 South in 2023 and 2024 with the Sandringham Sabres. He returned to the Sabres for the 2025 season, where he helped them win the NBL1 South championship. He re-signed with the Sabres for the 2026 NBL1 South season.

== National team career ==
In 2012, Pineau played for the Australia men's national under-19 basketball team at the FIBA Oceania U18 Championship and captained the team at the Albert Schweitzer Tournament.

Pineau played for the Australia men's national under-19 basketball team at the 2013 FIBA Under-19 World Championship in Prague. He averaged 11.8 points, 9 rebounds, and 1.3 assists on the fourth-place team. His best game was a 21-point outing versus Serbia.

In 2020, Pineau played for the Australian Boomers in two FIBA Asia Cup qualifiers.

== Personal life ==
Pineau is the son of Brad Pineau, who played in the NBL for the Devonport Warriors and Melbourne Tigers.

In 2025, Pineau moved back to Melbourne, married his wife Louise, and started a new job as part of the Major Client Group with the Commonwealth Bank.
