= Jordan Vandenberg =

Australian basketball player

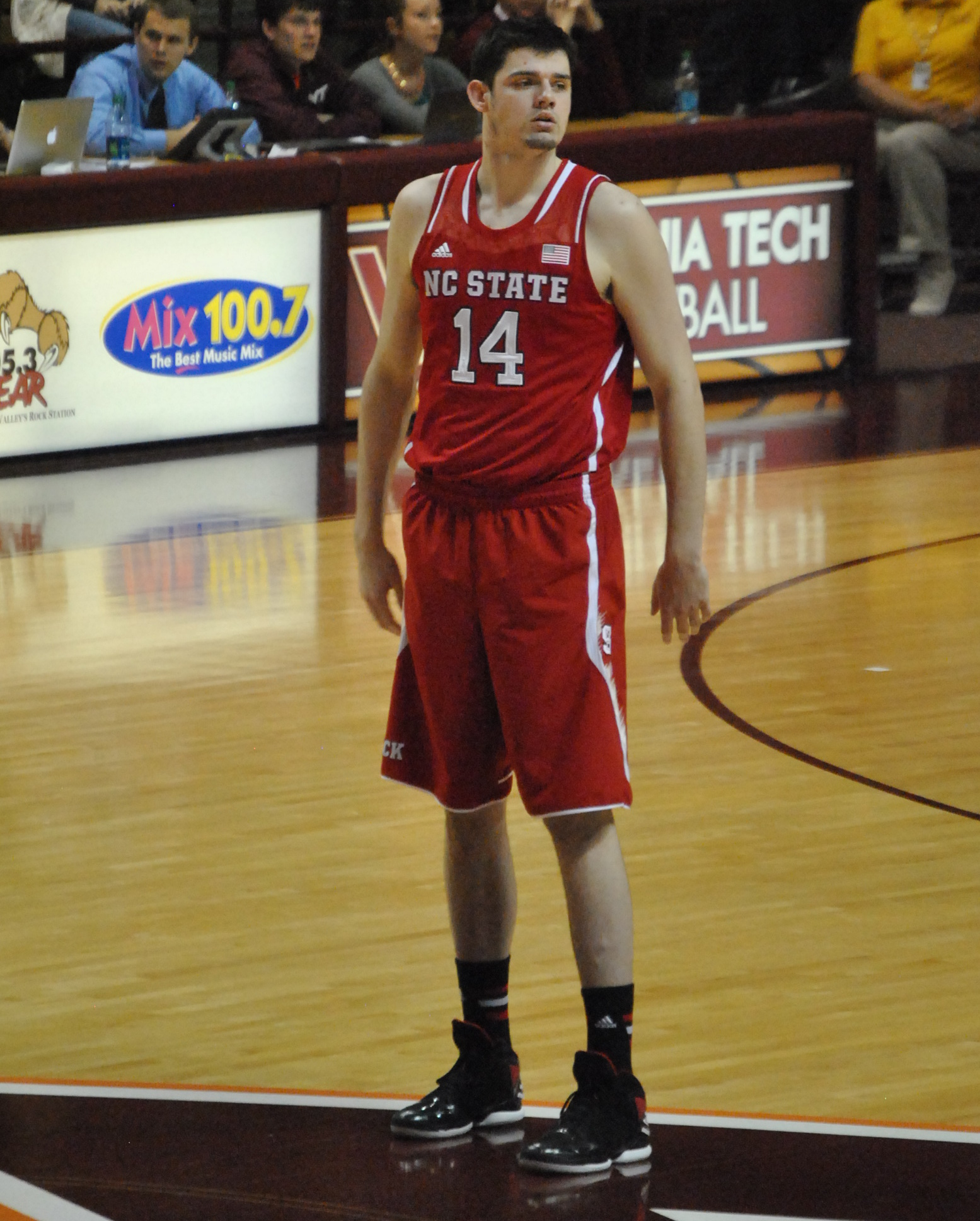
- Vandenberg with NC State in February 2014

No. 10 – McKinnon Cougars
- Position: Center
- League: Big V

Personal information
- Born: 25 March 1990 (age 36) Melbourne, Victoria, Australia
- Listed height: 216 cm (7 ft 1 in)
- Listed weight: 120 kg (265 lb)

Career information
- High school: Box Hill (Melbourne, Victoria)
- College: NC State (2009–2014)
- NBA draft: 2014: undrafted
- Playing career: 2008–present

Career history
- 2008: Australian Institute of Sport
- 2014: Westchester Knicks
- 2015: Bendigo Braves
- 2016: Sydney Kings
- 2016: Sandringham Sabres
- 2016–2018: Nishinomiya Storks
- 2018: Kumamoto Volters
- 2019: Southern Huskies
- 2021–present: McKinnon Cougars

Career highlights
- 2× Big V champion (2023, 2025)
- Stats at Basketball Reference

Jordan Vandenberg (born 25 March 1990) is an Australian professional basketball player for the McKinnon Cougars of the Big V. He played four seasons of college basketball for North Carolina State University. He also holds a Dutch passport because of his father.

== Early life ==
Born in Melbourne, Vandenberg played junior basketball for the Waverley Falcons and attended Box Hill Senior Secondary College. In 2008, he accepted a basketball scholarship at the Australian Institute of Sport (AIS) where he went on to represent Australia at the Albert Schweitzer Tournament. With the AIS men's team in the South East Australian Basketball League, he averaged 2.0 points and 2.1 rebounds in 17 games during the 2008 season.

In April 2009, Vandenberg committed to play college basketball for North Carolina State.

== College career ==
Vandenberg played five seasons (2009–14) for the NC State Wolfpack after being granted a medical redshirt during his junior season. He averaged 4.6 points, on 68% shooting, with 4.7 rebounds and 1.4 blocks over 22.3 minutes in 32 games (all starts) his senior season.

== Professional career ==
After going undrafted in the 2014 NBA draft, Vandenberg joined the New York Knicks for the 2014 NBA Summer League. On 23 October 2014, he signed with the Knicks, only to be waived by the team two days later. On 3 November 2014, he was acquired by the Westchester Knicks of the NBA Development League as an affiliate player of New York. On 23 December 2014, he was waived by Westchester after appearing in nine games.

On 4 March 2015, Vandenberg signed with the Bendigo Braves for the 2015 SEABL season. In 27 games for the Braves, he averaged 5.4 points and 4.6 rebounds per game.

On 7 January 2016, Vandenberg signed with the Sydney Kings as an injury replacement for Julian Khazzouh, joining the team for the rest of the 2015–16 NBL season. He appeared in eight games for the Kings, averaging 3.1 points and 1.6 rebounds per game.

On 29 March 2016, Vandenberg signed with the Sandringham Sabres of the 2016 SEABL season. In 24 games for the Sabres, he averaged 8.3 points and 6.6 rebounds per game.

On 27 October 2016, Vandenberg signed with Japanese team Nishinomiya Storks. In 53 games for Nishinomiya in 2016–17, he averaged 9.7 points, 9.1 rebounds, 1.2 assists and 1.6 blocks per game. He returned to Nishinomiya for the 2017–18 season before joining Kumamoto Volters in January 2018.

In April 2019, Vandenberg joined the Southern Huskies for the 2019 New Zealand NBL season. In 18 games, he averaged 5.1 points and 4.4 rebounds per game.

In March 2021, Vandenberg signed with the McKinnon Cougars for the 2021 Big V season. He re-signed with McKinnon in March 2022. In 2023, he helped the Cougars win the Big V championship. He returned to McKinnon in 2024 and 2025. He was a member of McKinnon's 2025 Big V championship-winning team.

== Personal life ==
Vandenberg is the son of Peter and Catherine Vandenberg, and has four siblings. One of his younger sisters, Jacinta, plays college basketball for the University of Oregon.
