= South East Melbourne Phoenix all-time roster =

The South East Melbourne Phoenix are an Australian professional basketball team based in Melbourne, Australia, and play in the National Basketball League. The team was established in 2019, and they play their regular season games at John Cain Arena and the State Basketball Centre.

The following is a list of all the players, both past and current, who have appeared in at least one game or have signed with the club. (Updated 13 August 2021)

== 2020s ==
=== Players ===
Player	#	Position	Nationality	2019/2020	2020/21	2021/22	2022/23	2023/24	2024/25	2025/26	2026/27	2027/28	2028/29
Deng Acuoth	12	C	South Sudanese	Player									
Kyle Adnam	4	PG	Australian	Player	Captain	Signed	Signed						
Terry Armstrong	35	SG	American	Player									
Keith Benson	34	C/PF	American	Player									
Ryan Broekhoff	45	SG/SF	Australian		Player	Signed	Signed						
Mitch Creek	55	SF/SG	Australian	MVP	Captain	Signed							
Jaye Crockett	30	F	American	Player									
Tristan Forsyth	30	F/C	Australian		Player								
Adam Gibson	1	G	Australian	Captain	Captain								
Cameron Gliddon	3	SG	Australian		Player	Signed							
Zach Hankins	–	C	America			Signed							
William Hickey	6	G	Australian	Player									
Mike Karena	14	C	New Zealander		Player								
Ben Madgen	9	SG/SF	Australian	Player									
Izayah Mauriohooho-Le’afa	8	G	New Zealander		Player	Signed	Signed						
Geremy McKay	14	PF	Australian	Player									
Ben Moore	26	PF	American		Player								
Dane Pineau	22	C	Australian	Player	Player	Signed	Signed						
Tohi Smith-Milner	–	F	New Zealander			Signed	Signed						
John Roberson	3	PG	American	Player									
Kendall Stephens	21	G	Australian	Player	Player								
Keifer Sykes	28	G	American		Player								
Reuben Te Rangi	7	SG/SF	New Zealander		Player	Signed							
Daniel Trist	25	F	Australian	Player									
Devondrick Walker	2	SG/SF	American	Player									
Tai Wesley	42	PF	American	Player									
Yanni Wetzell	10	F	New Zealander		Player								

- (United States) Xavier Munford

=== Coaching staff ===
Coach	2019/2020	2020/21	2021/22	2022/23	2023/24	2024/25	2025/26	2026/27	2027/28	2028/29
Judd Flavell	Assistant	Assistant								
Luke Kendall	Assistant	Assistant								
Simon Mitchell	Head Coach	Head Coach	Signed							
Ian Stacker	Assistant									
