= Corio Bay Stingrays =

- Leagues: Big V
- History: Corio Bay Stingrays; 2012–2019
- Arena: Geelong Basketball Netball Centre
- Location: Geelong, Victoria
- Team colors: White, blue, black
- Championships: 2 (2013, 2015)

The Corio Bay Stingrays were a basketball team based in Geelong, Victoria. The Stingrays competed in the men's Big V and played their home games at Geelong Basketball Netball Centre. The team was affiliated with Corio Bay Basketball Association (CBBA), which later merged to create Geelong United Basketball.

== Team history ==
=== CBL origins ===
Corio Bay Basketball Association originated with the Corio Bay-Barwon Bullets entering the men's Country Basketball League (CBL) in Victoria in 2009. The team won back-to-back CBL championships.

=== Big V ===
In December 2011, the Corio Bay Stingrays were accepted into the Big V for the 2012 season.

In 2013, the Stingrays reached the Big V grand final series, where they defeated the Ringwood Hawks 2–0 to win the championship. In 2014, the Stingrays reached the grand final series for the second straight year, where they lost 2–1 to the Hawks despite winning game one. In 2015, after five years being coached by Dan Riches, the Stingrays appointed Mark Leader as head coach. They went on to reach their third straight grand final series, where they defeated the McKinnon Cougars 2–0 to win their second Big V championship. The Stingrays returned to the grand final series in 2016, where they were defeated 2–0 by the Hawks.

After four straight grand final appearances, the Stingrays fell to eleventh in 2017 and then twelfth in 2018. A ninth-place finish in 2019 marked the team's final season in the top Big V division. That same year, Corio Bay Basketball Association and Basketball Geelong amalgamated under a new banner, Geelong United Basketball.

=== Post-amalgamation ===
For the 2020 season, a senior Stingrays women's team entered the Big V for the first time in Division Two. The men's team dropped to Division One. All home games were shifted to Geelong United's home bases of AWA Alliance Bank Stadium and Geelong Arena. The season ultimately did not take place due to the COVID-19 pandemic. In 2021 and 2022, the men remained in Division One and the women remained in Division Two. The Corio Bay Stingrays ceased to exist from 2023 onwards.
