= Mark Leader =

American basketball player (1960–2023)

Personal information
- Born: 7 January 1960 Idaho, United States
- Died: 17 January 2023 (aged 63)
- Listed height: 6 ft 4 in (1.93 m)

Career information
- College: Western Oregon (1980–1982)
- NBA draft: 1982: undrafted
- Playing career: 1983–1995
- Position: Guard
- Coaching career: 1996–2016

Career history

Playing
- 1983–1984: Devonport Warriors
- 1985: West Adelaide Bearcats
- 1986–1987: Geelong Supercats
- 1988–1995: North Melbourne Giants

Coaching
- 1996–1997: North Melbourne Giants (assistant)
- 1997–2000: Ballarat Miners
- 2002–2009: Geelong Supercats
- 2015–2016: Corio Bay Stingrays

Career highlights
- As player: 2× NBL champion (1989, 1994); As coach: Big V champion (2015); ABA champion (2006); 3× SEABL East champion (2005–2007)

Mark Allan Leader (7 January 1960 – 17 January 2023) was an American-Australian basketball player and coach. He played college basketball for Western Oregon University before moving to Australia where he played 12 seasons in the National Basketball League (NBL) between 1983 and 1995. He then continued in Australia as a coach. Leader was a two-time NBL champion as a player and won multiple championships as a coach at the state league level.

== Early life ==
Mark Allan Leader was born on 7 January 1960 in Idaho. He grew up in Oregon.

== College career ==
Leader attended Western Oregon University between 1980 and 1982. He was the team leader in assists in 1981–82 with 102.

== Professional career ==
Leader moved to Australia in 1982 to play for the Ulverstone Redhoppers in the North West Basketball Union in Tasmania. He made his National Basketball League (NBL) debut with the Devonport Warriors in 1983 and averaged 22.1 points and 10.5 rebounds in his first season. In 1984, he served as the Warriors' player/coach and had his best statistical season, averaging 28.7 points, 14.3 rebounds, 5.7 assists, 2.1 steals and 1.7 blocks.

After the demise of the Warriors, Leader joined the West Adelaide Bearcats in the SA State League and was set to play for the Bearcats NBL team as well but after the team merged with the Adelaide 36ers for the 1985 NBL season, he missed out on a roster spot to Mark Davis.

In 1986 and 1987, Leader played for the Geelong Supercats in the NBL. He averaged 18.8 points and 8.2 rebounds for the Supercats in 1987.

In 1988, Leader joined the North Melbourne Giants and went on to win NBL championships in 1989 and 1994 before retiring following the 1995 season. He was captain of the Giants for their championship in 1994.

Leader was the first player in NBL history to record four triple-doubles.

== Coaching career ==
In 1996 and 1997, Leader served as assistant coach of the North Melbourne Giants under head coach Brett Brown.

Between 1997 and 2000, Leader served as head coach of the Ballarat Miners in the South East Australian Basketball League (SEABL).

Leader returned to the SEABL in 2002, as he coached the Geelong Supercats for eight seasons until 2009. He won three SEABL East championships in a row between 2005 and 2007, and in 2006 he guided the Supercats to the ABA National championship.

In 2015 and 2016, Leader coached the Corio Bay Stingrays in the Big V, winning a championship in 2015.

== Personal life ==
Leader became a naturalised Australian in 1987.

== Death ==
Leader died of cancer on 17 January 2023.
