= Angus Glover =

Australian basketball player (born 1998)

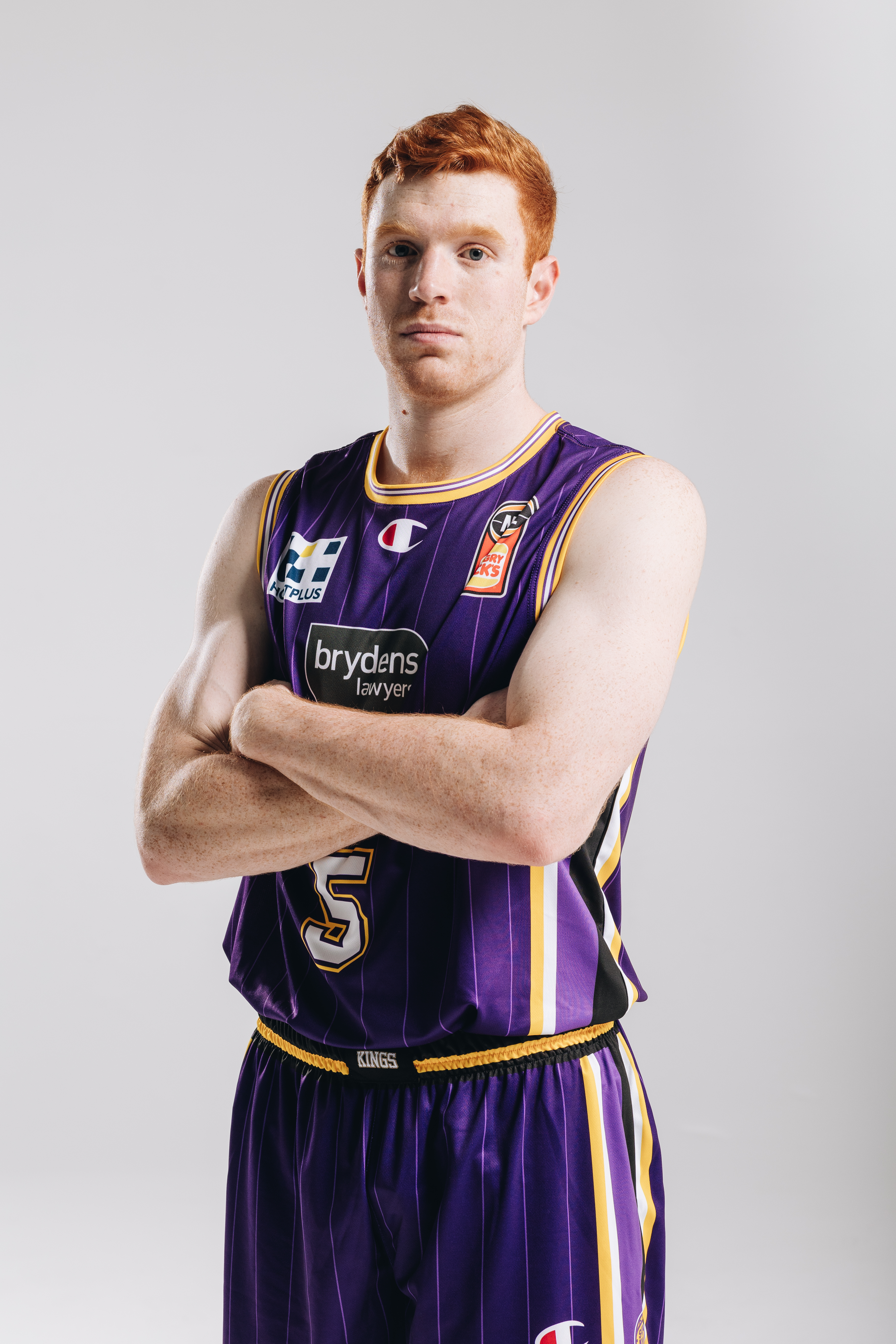
- Glover with the Sydney Kings in 2021

No. 5 – South East Melbourne Phoenix
- Position: Guard
- League: NBL

Personal information
- Born: 8 September 1998 (age 28) Mount Warrigal, New South Wales, Australia
- Listed height: 194 cm (6 ft 4 in)
- Listed weight: 90 kg (198 lb)

Career information
- High school: Holy Spirit College (Wollongong, New South Wales)
- Playing career: 2014–present

Career history
- 2014–2017: BA Centre of Excellence
- 2014: Illawarra Hawks (Waratah)
- 2016–2020: Illawarra Hawks
- 2019: BA Centre of Excellence
- 2020–2024: Sydney Kings
- 2023–2024: Eltham Wildcats
- 2024–present: South East Melbourne Phoenix
- 2025: Ringwood Hawks
- 2026: Kilsyth Cobras

Career highlights
- 2× NBL champion (2022, 2023); NBL1 South champion (2024); NBL1 South Grand Final MVP (2024); NBL Best Sixth Man (2026)

Angus Jack Glover (born 8 September 1998) is an Australian professional basketball player for the South East Melbourne Phoenix of the National Basketball League (NBL).

== Early life and career ==
Glover was born in Mount Warrigal, New South Wales, and raised in nearby Wollongong. He grew up playing for the New South Wales Country basketball team. Glover attended Holy Spirit College in Wollongong.

In 2014, Glover made his debut in the SEABL for the BA Centre of Excellence and also had a one-game stint in the Waratah League for the Illawarra Hawks. He returned to the Centre of Excellence in 2015, 2016 and 2017. He had another quick stint with the Centre of Excellence in 2019 in the inaugural NBL1 season.

== Professional career ==
=== Illawarra Hawks (2016–2020) ===
Glover signed with his hometown Illawarra Hawks as a development player in 2016. In 2017, he tore his anterior cruciate ligament (ACL) for the second time and rehabilitated while contracted to the Hawks as he turned down an offer to play college basketball with the Saint Mary's Gaels.

Glover returned to play in 2019 and subsequently signed a two-year full contract with the Hawks. His remaining contract with the Hawks was voided when the club was liquidated on 18 May 2020.

=== Sydney Kings (2020–2024) ===
On 20 July 2020, Glover signed a three-year deal with the Sydney Kings. In 2021 he tore his ACL for the third time. His father's hamstring was used to repair this tear after using his own hamstrings to repair the previous two tears. He went on to became a two-time NBL champion in 2022 and 2023. Following the 2022–23 NBL season, he joined the Eltham Wildcats of the NBL1 South.

On 24 March 2023, Glover re-signed with the Kings on a two-year deal. On 5 April 2024, he was granted a release from the final year of his contract. He subsequently re-joined the Eltham Wildcats for the 2024 NBL1 South season. He helped the Wildcats win the NBL1 South championship while earning grand final MVP honours.

=== South East Melbourne Phoenix (2024–present) ===
On 16 April 2024, Glover signed a two-year deal with the South East Melbourne Phoenix. In 34 games during the 2024–25 NBL season, he averaged 10.1 points, 2.7 rebounds and 2.3 assists per game.

Glover was originally slated to join the Taranaki Airs for the 2025 New Zealand NBL season and then attempted to sign with Riesen Ludwigsburg of the Basketball Bundesliga. After returning to Australia due to a reported failed medical, he joined the Ringwood Hawks for the 2025 NBL1 South season.

On 18 October 2025, Glover scored a career-high 26 points in the Phoenix's 116–76 win over the Illawarra Hawks. For the 2025–26 NBL season, he was named the NBL Best Sixth Man and averaged a career-high 10.4 points per game.

In May 2026, Glover joined the Kilsyth Cobras for the rest of the 2026 NBL1 South season.

In November 2026, Glover played his 200th NBL game.

== National team career ==
Glover played for Australian national junior teams between 2014 and 2016. He won silver at the 2016 FIBA Oceania Under-18 Championship in Fiji. He debuted for the Australian Boomers during the FIBA Asia Cup 2021 Qualifiers.

In April 2025, Glover was named in the Boomers squad for a trans-Tasman series against New Zealand in May. In July 2025, he was named in the Boomers squad in the lead up to the 2025 FIBA Asia Cup in Saudi Arabia. A shoulder injury saw him miss the final Asia Cup squad.

In October 2025, Glover was named in the Boomers squad for the first window of the FIBA Basketball World Cup 2027 Asian Qualifiers. In June 2026, he was named in the squad for two more Asian qualifiers in Perth in July. In August 2026, he was named in the squad for two more Asian qualifiers.

== Personal life ==
Glover's wife, Kiera Rowe, is a former WNBL player.
