= David Barlow (basketball) =

Australian basketball player

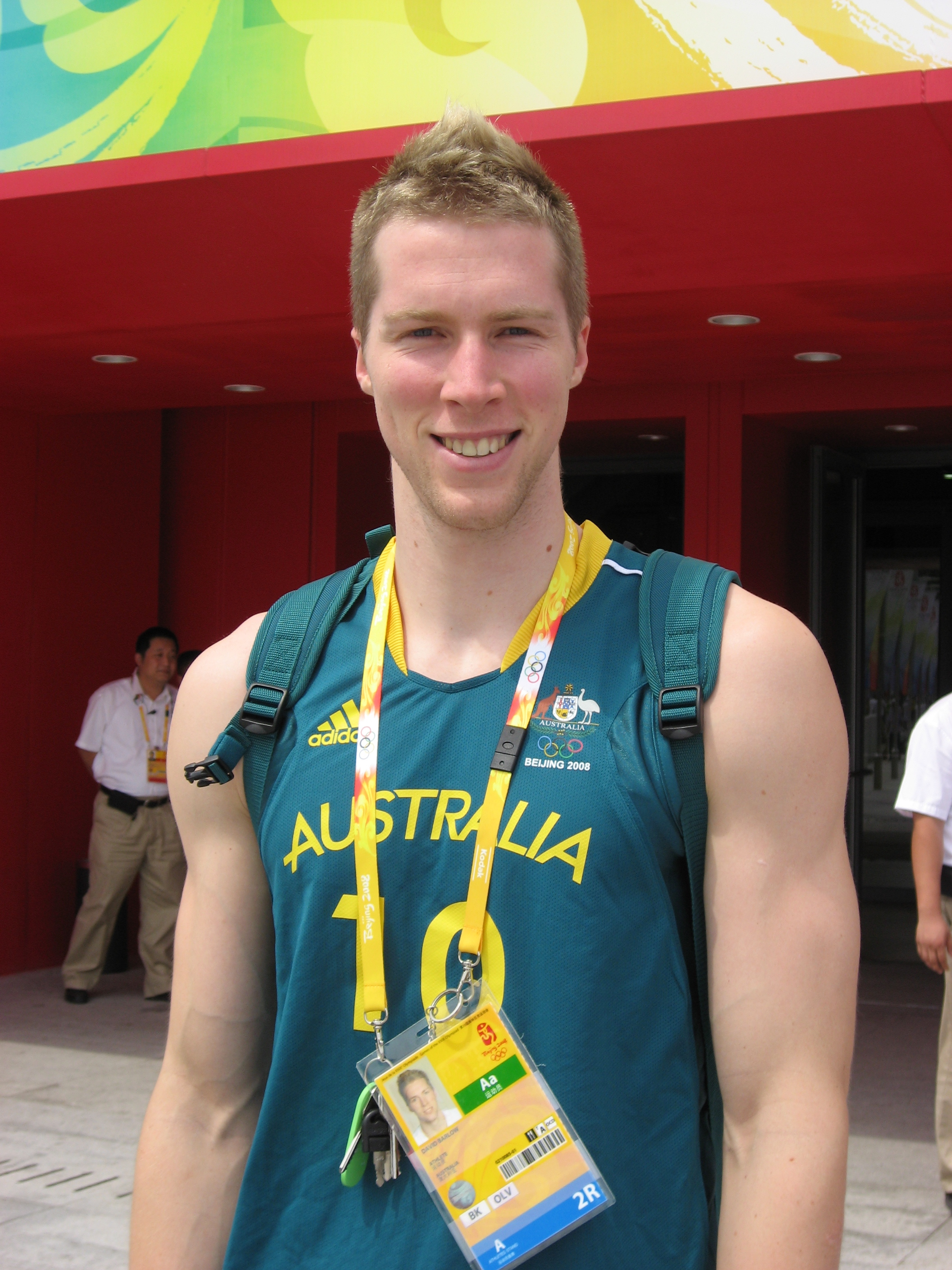
- Barlow in August 2008

Melbourne United
- Title: Assistant coach
- League: NBL

Personal information
- Born: 22 October 1983 (age 43) Melbourne, Victoria, Australia
- Listed height: 205 cm (6 ft 9 in)
- Listed weight: 103 kg (227 lb)

Career information
- High school: Sandringham College (Melbourne, Victoria)
- College: Metro State (2002–2003)
- Playing career: 2001–present
- Position: Small forward / power forward
- Coaching career: 2022–present

Career history

Playing
- 2001–2003: Sandringham Sabres
- 2003–2007: Sydney Kings
- 2004–2006: Sydney Comets
- 2007–2009: Melbourne Tigers
- 2009–2011: CAI Zaragoza
- 2011–2013: UCAM Murcia
- 2013–2014: Stelmet Zielona Góra
- 2014–2023: Melbourne United
- 2017: Obradoiro
- 2018–2019; 2022–: Sandringham Sabres

Coaching
- 2022–present: Sandringham Sabres
- 2023–present: Melbourne United (assistant)

Career highlights
- 5× NBL champion (2004, 2005, 2008, 2018, 2021); NBL1 South champion (2025); LEB Oro champion (2010); 2× Waratah League champion (2004, 2005); Big V champion (2002); All-NBL Third Team (2009)

David Barlow (born 22 October 1983) is an Australian basketball player and coach. He currently serves as an assistant coach of Melbourne United in the National Basketball League (NBL). He also serves as player-coach of the Sandringham Sabres in the NBL1 South.

Barlow played professional basketball between 2003 and 2023. He won five NBL championships in 2004, 2005, 2008, 2018 and 2021.

== Junior career ==
Born in the Melbourne suburb of Sandringham, Barlow played for the Sandringham Sabres of the Big V from 2001 to 2003. In 2002, Barlow moved to the United States to attend Metropolitan State University of Denver in Colorado. In 2002–03, he played 30 games (13 starts) for the Roadrunners, averaging 2.9 points and 1.9 rebounds per game.

== Professional career ==
=== Early years in the NBL (2003–2009) ===
Barlow returned to Australia in 2003 and signed with the Sydney Kings of the National Basketball League (NBL). He spent four seasons with the Kings and was a member of two championship-winning teams. On 28 November 2006, he was ruled out of the rest of the 2006–07 NBL season after rupturing the anterior cruciate ligament in his right knee at training the day before. Between 2004 and 2006, Barlow also played in the Waratah League for the Sydney Comets.

In April 2007, Barlow signed with the Melbourne Tigers. He spent two seasons with the Tigers and helped the club win the 2007–08 NBL championship.

=== Spain (2009–2013) ===
In August 2009, Barlow parted ways with the Tigers and signed a one-year deal with Spanish club CAI Zaragoza. In 2009–10, he helped Zaragoza win the LEB Oro championship. In May 2010, he re-signed with CAI Zaragoza for the 2010–11 season.

In August 2011, Barlow signed a one-year deal with UCAM Murcia. In July 2012, he re-signed with Murcia on a two-year deal. In July 2013, he parted ways with Murcia.

=== Poland (2013–2014) ===
On 9 August 2013, Barlow signed a two-year deal with Polish club Stelmet Zielona Góra. On 14 January 2014, he parted ways with Stelmet.

=== Melbourne United, Obradoiro and Sandringham Sabres (2014–2023) ===
On 2 July 2014, Barlow signed a two-year deal with Melbourne United. In 2014–15, he averaged 9.0 points and 3.7 rebounds in 25 games. Barlow sat out the entire 2015–16 season with an achilles injury.

On 24 May 2016, Barlow re-signed with Melbourne United for the 2016–17 NBL season. He missed the team's first nine games of the season with a calf injury. Following the NBL season, he joined Obradoiro in Spain but only appeared in one game to finish the 2016–17 ACB season.

On 16 June 2017, Barlow re-signed with Melbourne United for the 2017–18 NBL season. In March 2018, he helped United win the NBL championship. During the 2018 off-season, he was initially set to play in New Zealand for the Hawke's Bay Hawks but ultimately played for the Sandringham Sabres in the SEABL.

On 7 May 2018, Barlow re-signed with United for the 2018–19 NBL season. In March 2019, Barlow set a new record for NBL Grand Final appearances with his 26th appearance. In April 2019, he re-joined the Sandringham Sabres.

On 29 April 2019, Barlow re-signed with United for the 2019–20 NBL season. After injuring his thumb in a pre-season game he missed both of United's pre-season NBLxNBA games and the first two rounds of the season, however he returned to help them recover from a poor start to the season and reach the semi-finals.

On 22 July 2020, Barlow re-signed with United for the 2020–21 NBL season. In June 2021, he helped United win the NBL championship.

On 5 July 2021, Barlow re-signed with United for the 2021–22 NBL season.

After initially announcing his retirement and joining United's coaching staff, Barlow reversed his retirement decision and re-signed with the United on 16 September 2022 for the 2022–23 NBL season.

=== Sandringham Sabres player-coach (2022–present) ===
Barlow served as player-coach of the Sandringham Sabres in the NBL1 South during the 2022 season. He returned to the Sabres as player-coach for the 2023 NBL1 South season, helping the team reach the grand final, where they lost 90–86 to the Knox Raiders. He continued as the Sabres' player-coach in 2024 and 2025. He guided the Sabres as playing-coach to the 2025 NBL1 South championship.

In November 2025, Barlow re-signed with the Sabres as player-coach for another two seasons.

== National team career ==
In 2006, Barlow made his debut for the Australian national team at the 2006 FIBA World Championship in Japan. He went on to make his Olympic debut in Beijing 2008 where the Boomers finished seventh. In 2010, Barlow was part of the Boomers team to contest the World Championships in Turkey where the team placed 10th. Barlow returned to Olympic competition at the London 2012 Games. With Australia losing their opening two preliminary matches to Brazil and Spain, they went on to defeat China, hosts Great Britain and Russia to set up a quarter-final match against the USA. The Boomers went down 119–86 to the eventual gold medallists to finish seventh.

== Coaching career ==
On 10 August 2023, Barlow was appointed an assistant coach of Melbourne United for the 2023–24 NBL season. He continued as United's assistant coach in 2024–25 and 2025–26.

In February 2026, Barlow was appointed an assistant coach for the Australian Boomers for two FIBA Basketball World Cup 2027 Asian Qualifiers. In November 2026, he was named an assistant coach for two more Asian qualifiers.

== Personal life ==
Barlow and his wife Tiwi have 3 children. His wife is a native of Bali.
