= 2021–22 Southside Flyers season =

Women's National Basketball League season

- Head Coach: Cheryl Chambers
- Captain: Jenna O'Hea
- Venue: Dandenong Stadium

Results
- Record: 5–12
- Ladder: 7th
- Finals: Did not qualify

Leaders
- Points: Cole (16.7)
- Rebounds: Bishop (9.8)
- Assists: M. Rocci (4.5)

The 2021–22 Southside Flyers season is the 30th season for the franchise in the Women's National Basketball League (WNBL).

== Roster ==
2021–22 Southside Flyers roster
Players
Coaches

Pos.	No.	Nat.	Name	Ht.
G	1	(Australia)	Cole, Rebecca	1.78 m (5 ft 10 in)
G	2	(Australia)	Simmons, Taylah	1.78 m (5 ft 10 in)
G	3	(Australia)	Rocci, Aimie	1.78 m (5 ft 10 in)
G/F	4	(Australia)	O'Hea, Jenna (C)	1.87 m (6 ft 2 in)
G	5	(Australia)	Wallace, Kristy	1.80 m (5 ft 11 in)
G	9	(Australia)	Rocci, Maddison	1.68 m (5 ft 6 in)
F/C	10	(Australia)	Bishop, Abby	1.89 m (6 ft 2 in)
G	11	(Australia)	Gaze, Kate	1.78 m (5 ft 10 in)
F	12	(Australia)	Jarry, Rachel	1.85 m (6 ft 1 in)
F	15	(Australia)	Blicavs, Sara	1.89 m (6 ft 2 in)
F	22	(Australia)	Whittle-Harmon, Emilee	1.89 m (6 ft 2 in)

Head coach

- (Australia) Cheryl Chambers

Assistant coach(es)

- (Australia) Belinda Snell

Legend

- (C) Team captain
- (DP) Development player
- (I) Import player
- Injured

- Roster
Updated: 4 December 2021

== Standings ==
#	WNBL Championship ladder				
#	Team	W	L	PCT	GP
1	Melbourne Boomers	12	5	70.5	17
2	Perth Lynx	11	5	68.7	16
3	Canberra Capitals	11	6	64.7	17
4	Adelaide Lightning	10	7	58.8	17
5	Bendigo Spirit	7	9	43.7	16
6	Townsville Fire	7	10	41.1	17
7	Southside Flyers	5	12	29.4	17
8	Sydney Uni Flames	4	13	23.5	17

== Results ==
=== Regular season ===
Game	Date	Team	Score	High points	High rebounds	High assists	Location	Record
1	December; 4	Bendigo	94–83	Blicavs (27)	Bishop (11)	M. Rocci (8)	Dandenong Stadium	1–0
2	December; 11	@ Melbourne	72–91	M. Rocci (21)	Bishop (12)	A. Rocci (4)	Melbourne Sports Centre Parkville	1–1
3	December; 18	Melbourne	72–87	Cole (20)	O'Hea (6)	O'Hea (6)	Dandenong Stadium	1–2
4	December; 23	Townsville	86–81	Cole (24)	O'Hea (10)	Bishop (4)	Dandenong Stadium	2–2
5	January; 12	Perth	79–83 (OT)	Blicavs (21)	Bishop (17)	Bishop, Cole, A. Rocci (5)	Selkirk Stadium	2–3
6	January; 15	@ Melbourne	72–75	Bishop, Cole (17)	Bishop (10)	Bishop (5)	Melbourne Sports Centre Parkville	2–4
7	January; 27	Perth	78–85	Gaze (16)	Bishop (12)	O'Hea (6)	Dandenong Stadium	2–5
8	January; 30	@ Sydney	73–70	Cole (21)	Blicavs (10)	M. Rocci (5)	Qudos Bank Arena	3–5
9	February; 5	@ Canberra	69–94	Whittle-Harmon (20)	O'Hea, Whittle-Harmon (7)	Cole (4)	National Convention Centre	3–6
10	February; 17	@ Canberra	0–20^{a}	–	–	–	National Convention Centre	3–7
11	February; 19	Adelaide	72–85	Cole (17)	Blicavs (10)	M. Rocci (4)	Dandenong Stadium	3–8
12	February; 26	Bendigo	80–96	M. Rocci (29)	Whittle-Harmon (6)	Cole (5)	MyState Bank Arena	3–9
13	March; 2	@ Bendigo	70–78	Blicavs (24)	Blicavs (8)	M. Rocci (6)	MyState Bank Arena	3–10
14	March; 5	Canberra	64–106	Blicavs (23)	Blicavs (11)	M. Rocci (6)	Dandenong Stadium	3–11
15	March; 10	Sydney	66–68	O'Hea (19)	M. Rocci (8)	A. Rocci (6)	Dandenong Stadium	3–12
16	March; 13	@ Townsville	100–79	Whittle-Harmon (22)	Whittle-Harmon (11)	M. Rocci (8)	Townsville Stadium	4–12
17	March; 19	@ Adelaide	87–79	Cole (23)	A. Rocci (8)	Cole, M. Rocci (5)	The Lights Community and Sports Centre	5–12

Notes

- ^{a} Southside's Round 11 game against the Canberra Capitals was a loss by forfeit.
