= Marie Gülich =

German basketball player (born 1994)

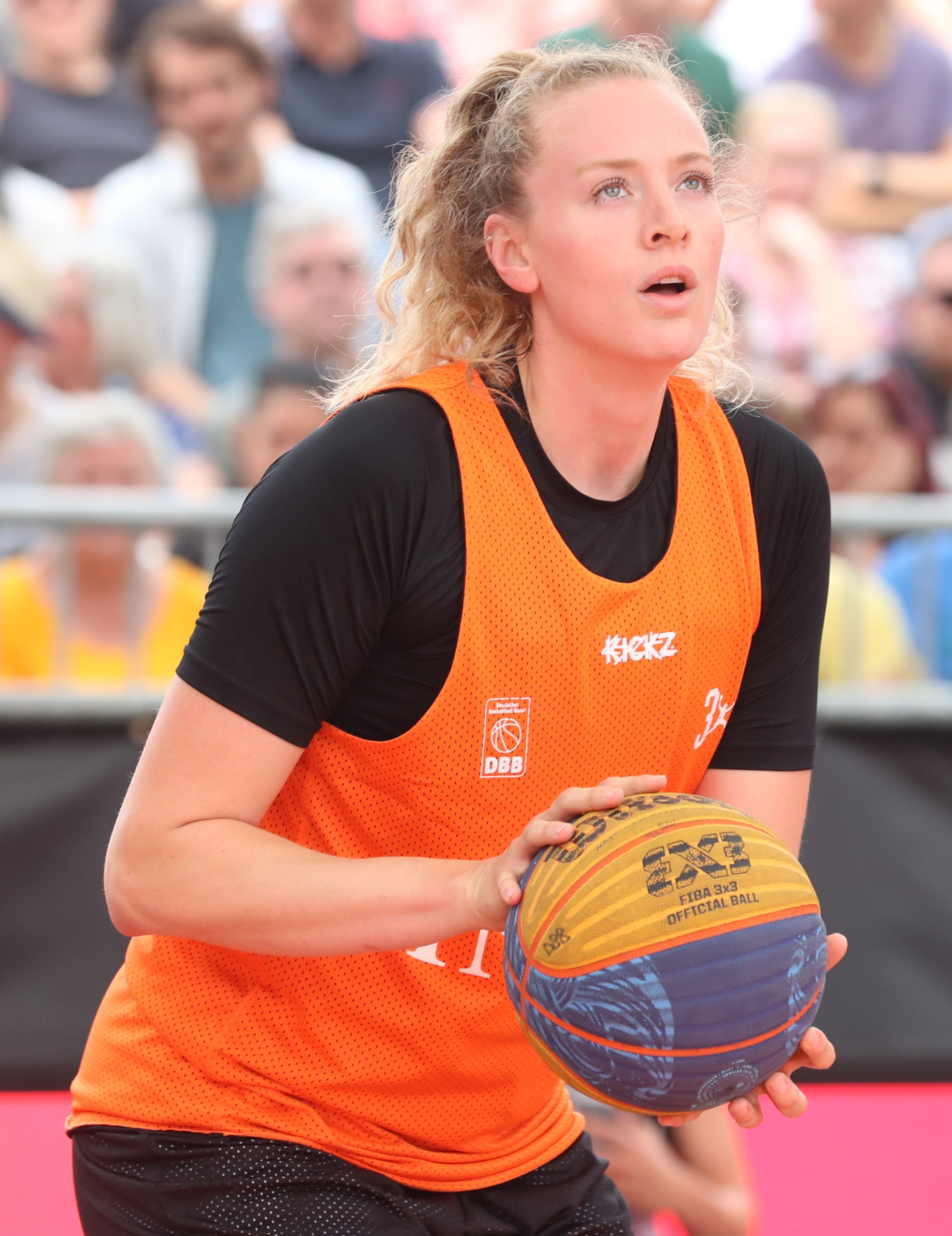

No. 21 – Townsville Fire
- Position: Center
- League: WNBL

Personal information
- Born: 28 May 1994 (age 32) Altenkirchen, Germany
- Listed height: 6 ft 5 in (1.96 m)
- Listed weight: 205 lb (93 kg)

Career information
- High school: Landrat-Lucas Gymnasium
- College: Oregon State (2014–2018)
- WNBA draft: 2018: 1st round, 12th overall pick
- Drafted by: Phoenix Mercury
- Playing career: 2011–2014；2018–present

Career history
- 2011–2014: BBZ Opladen
- 2013–2014: New Basket Oberhausen
- 2018: Phoenix Mercury
- 2018–2019: Reyer Venezia
- 2019: Atlanta Dream
- 2019–2020: Arka Gdynia
- 2020: Los Angeles Sparks
- 2020–2024: Valencia Basket
- 2024–2026: Taiyuan Textile
- 2026-present: Townsville Fire

Career highlights
- 3× First-team All-Pac-12 (2016–2018)
- Stats at Basketball Reference

Marie Isabelle Gülich (born 28 May 1994) is a German professional basketball player. She was drafted 12th overall by the Phoenix Mercury in the 2018 WNBA draft. Gülich played center for the Oregon State Beavers women's basketball team in college. During the 2019 WNBA draft she was traded to the Atlanta Dream for the 11th overall pick Brianna Turner.

== WNBA career statistics ==
Legend
| GP | Games played | GS | Games started | MPG | Minutes per game | RPG | Rebounds per game |
| APG | Assists per game | SPG | Steals per game | BPG | Blocks per game | PPG | Points per game |
| TO | Turnovers per game | FG% | Field-goal percentage | 3P% | 3-point field-goal percentage | FT% | Free-throw percentage |
| **Bold** | Career best | ° | League leader |

| † | Denotes seasons in which Parker won a WNBA championship |

=== Regular season ===
| Year | Team | GP | GS | MPG | FG% | 3P% | FT% | RPG | APG | SPG | BPG | PPG |
|---|---|---|---|---|---|---|---|---|---|---|---|---|
| 2018 | Phoenix | 23 | 0 | 5.0 | .483 | .000 | .750 | 1.0 | 0.1 | 0.0 | 0.6 | 1.5 |
| 2019 | Atlanta | **31** | 1 | **11.3** | .361 | **.320** | .727 | **2.7** | **0.6** | 0.2 | **1.0** | **3.3** |
| 2020 | Los Angeles | 12 | 1 | 9.9 | **.500** | .000 | **1.000** | 1.5 | **0.6** | **0.3** | 0.4 | 2.4 |
| Career | | 66 | 2 | 8.8 | .405 | .286 | .758 | 1.9 | 0.4 | 0.2 | 0.5 | 2.5 |
