= 2021–22 Sydney Uni Flames season =

Women's National Basketball season

- Head Coach: Shane Heal
- Captain: Keely Froling; Lauren Mansfield (co)
- Venue: Qudos Bank Arena / Brydens Stadium

Results
- Record: 4–13
- Ladder: 8th
- Finals: Did not qualify

Leaders
- Points: Froling (16.3)
- Rebounds: Purcell (9.4)
- Assists: Heal (4.2)

The 2021–22 Sydney Uni Flames season was the 42nd season for the franchise in the Women's National Basketball League (WNBL).

In 2021, Shane Heal made his debut as the new head coach of the Flames. Keely Froling and Lauren Mansfield were named as the new Team Co-Captains. Brydens Lawyers remain as the Flames' naming rights sponsor for the ninth consecutive season.

== Roster ==
2021–22 Sydney Uni Flames roster
Players
Coaches

Pos.	No.	Nat.	Name	Ht.
G	2	(Australia)	Mahady, Emma	1.79 m (5 ft 10 in)
G	3	(Australia)	Nakkaşoğlu, Funda	1.73 m (5 ft 8 in)
G	4	(Australia)	Heal, Shyla	1.67 m (5 ft 6 in)
F	8	(Australia)	Pizzey, Rebecca	1.90 m (6 ft 3 in)
G	9	(Australia)	Deeble, Katie	1.72 m (5 ft 8 in)
F	10	(Australia)	Rowe, Kiera	1.80 m (5 ft 11 in)
F	12	(Australia)	Evans, Chyra	1.88 m (6 ft 2 in)
F	14	(United States)	Blazejewski, Maria	1.83 m (6 ft 0 in)
F	21	(Australia)	Froling, Keely (C)	1.88 m (6 ft 2 in)
G	24	(Australia)	Yaeger, Morgan	1.75 m (5 ft 9 in)
F	32	(New Zealand)	Purcell, Kalani	1.87 m (6 ft 2 in)
G	33	(Australia)	Mansfield, Lauren (injured) (C)	1.70 m (5 ft 7 in)

Head coach

- (Australia) Shane Heal

Assistant coach(es)

- (Australia) Shelley Gorman

Legend

- (C) Team captain
- (DP) Development player
- (I) Import player
- Injured

- Roster
Updated: 26 January 2022

== Standings ==
#	WNBL Championship ladder				
#	Team	W	L	PCT	GP
1	Melbourne Boomers	12	5	70.5	17
2	Perth Lynx	11	5	68.7	16
3	Canberra Capitals	11	6	64.7	17
4	Adelaide Lightning	10	7	58.8	17
5	Bendigo Spirit	7	9	43.7	16
6	Townsville Fire	7	10	41.1	17
7	Southside Flyers	5	12	29.4	17
8	Sydney Uni Flames	4	13	23.5	17

== Results ==
=== Regular season ===
Game	Date	Team	Score	High points	High rebounds	High assists	Location	Record
1	December; 5	Canberra	55–58	Watts (16)	Purcell (8)	Purcell (4)	Qudos Bank Arena	0–1
2	December; 18	@ Townsville	56–75	Heal (12)	Purcell (9)	Mansfield (7)	Townsville Entertainment Centre	0–2
3	December; 22	Melbourne	77–83	Heal (29)	Froling (10)	Mansfield (8)	Qudos Bank Arena	0–3
4	January; 20	Adelaide	52–77	Heal (13)	Heal (7)	Heal (4)	Brydens Stadium	0–4
5	January; 23	Perth	81–86	Mansfield (24)	Davis (13)	Heal (7)	Qudos Bank Arena	0–5
6	January; 25	@ Bendigo	83–72	Heal (22)	Froling (6)	Heal, Purcell (5)	Bendigo Stadium	1–5
7	January; 28	@ Canberra	54–86	Heal (16)	Froling (7)	Mansfield (5)	National Convention Centre	1–6
8	January; 30	Southside	70–73	Nakkaşoğlu (17)	Purcell (14)	Heal (7)	Qudos Bank Arena	1–7
9	February; 6	Townsville	66–86	Nakkaşoğlu (14)	Froling, Purcell (8)	Purcell (5)	Qudos Bank Arena	1–8
10	February; 17	@ Townsville	63–84	Froling (31)	Purcell (10)	Nakkaşoğlu, Purcell (4)	Townsville Entertainment Centre	1–9
11	February; 20	@ Melbourne	76–85	Froling (24)	Purcell (16)	Purcell (6)	State Basketball Centre	1–10
12	February; 26	Adelaide	56–73	Heal (24)	Purcell (12)	Heal (5)	Hills Basketball Stadium	1–11
13	March; 5	@ Perth	66–63	Froling (30)	Froling (22)	Purcell (2)	Bendat Basketball Centre	2–11
14	March; 10	@ Southside	68–66	Froling (21)	Purcell (14)	Heal (4)	Dandenong Stadium	3–11
15	March; 12	@ Bendigo	61–56	Froling (18)	Purcell (12)	Nakkaşoğlu (3)	Bendigo Stadium	4–11
16	March; 16	Perth	72–84	Froling (19)	Froling (13)	Purcell (10)	Brydens Stadium	4–12
17	March; 20	Bendigo	73–85	Froling (27)	Froling (9)	Heal (6)	Brydens Stadium	4–13
