= Geelong United =

Geelong United may refer to:

- Geelong United Basketball, basketball association in Geelong, Victoria
- Geelong United (NBL1 South), basketball club in the NBL1 South, formerly known as Geelong Supercats in NBL, SEABL and NBL1
- Geelong Venom, basketball team in the WNBL formerly known as Geelong United
