= Marty Clarke =

Marty Clarke may refer to:

- Martin Clarke (footballer) (born 1987), Gaelic and Australian rules footballer
- Marty Clarke (basketball) (born 1967), Australian basketball player and coach
