= Luke Kendall =

Australian basketball player and coach

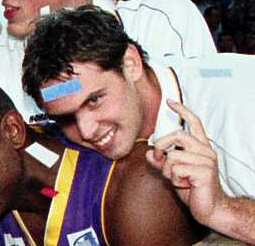
- Kendall with the Sydney Kings in 2005

Casey Cavaliers
- Title: Head coach
- League: NBL1 South

Personal information
- Born: 25 May 1981 (age 45) Melbourne, Victoria, Australia
- Listed height: 193 cm (6 ft 4 in)
- Listed weight: 90 kg (198 lb)

Career information
- High school: Box Hill (Melbourne, Victoria)
- College: Metro State (2000–2004)
- NBA draft: 2004: undrafted
- Playing career: 1999–2014
- Position: Point guard / Shooting guard
- Coaching career: 2015–present

Career history

Playing
- 1999–2000; 2004: Kilsyth Cobras
- 2004–2008: Sydney Kings
- 2008: Perth Wildcats
- 2009–2010: Melbourne Tigers
- 2010: Sydney Kings
- 2011: Gold Coast Blaze
- 2011: Nunawading Spectres
- 2012: Sandringham Sabres
- 2013–2014: Sydney Comets

Coaching
- 2015–2017: Sydney Comets
- 2016–2019: Sydney Kings (assistant)
- 2019–2022: South East Melbourne Phoenix (assistant)
- 2025: Gujarat Stallions
- 2025–present: Casey Cavaliers

Career highlights
- As player: NBL champion (2005); SEABL champion (2011); NCAA Division II champion (2002); First-team All-RMAC (2003); As coach: INBL champion (2025); Waratah League champion (2015); Waratah League Coach of the Year (2017)
Medals
Men's basketball
Representing Australia
Gold medal – first place	2006 Melbourne	Team competition

Luke Kendall (born 25 May 1981) is an Australian basketball coach and former player. He played seven years in the National Basketball League (NBL) between 2004 and 2011, winning a championship in 2005.

== Early life ==
Kendall was born in Melbourne, Victoria. He attended Box Hill Senior Secondary College and played for the Kilsyth Cobras in the SEABL in 1999 and 2000.

== College career ==
Kendall played four years of NCAA Division II college basketball for Metro State between 2000 and 2004. The Roadrunners won the NCAA Division II championship in 2002 and Kendall was named first-team All-Rocky Mountain Athletic Conference in 2003.

== Professional career ==
After graduating college in 2004, Kendall returned to the Kilsyth Cobras in the SEABL. He then joined the Sydney Kings of the NBL for the 2004–05 season. He was a contender for NBL Rookie of the Year in 2005 before a knee injury ended his season after just 12 games. The Kings went on to win the 2004–05 NBL championship.

After four seasons with the Kings, the team folded following the 2007–08 NBL season. He subsequently joined the Perth Wildcats for 2008–09 NBL season. He left the Wildcats in December 2008 after 12 games, and in January 2009 he joined the Melbourne Tigers for the remainder of the 2008–09 season. He continued on with the Tigers for the 2009–10 NBL season.

The Kings returned to the NBL in the 2010–11 season. Kendall played one game for the Kings in November 2010 before joining the Gold Coast Blaze in February 2011 for the rest of the season.

Kendall finished his NBL career with 173 games and averages of 10.6 points, 3.5 rebounds and 3.6 assists per game.

Kendall returned to the SEABL in 2011 and played for the Nunawading Spectres. He then played for the Sandringham Sabres in 2012. Between 2013 and 2014, he played in the Waratah League for the Sydney Comets.

== National team career ==
Kendall represented Australia at the 2001 World Championship for Young Men, 2006 FIBA Stanković Continental Champions' Cup, 2006 FIBA World Championship, and 2007 FIBA Oceania Championship. He was also a member of the Australian team that won the gold medal at the 2006 Commonwealth Games.

== Coaching career ==
Between 2015 and 2017, Kendall served as coach of the Sydney Comets in the Waratah League.

Kendall joined the Sydney Kings for the 2016–17 NBL season in a part-time coaching role. He was promoted to a full-time assistant coach for the 2017–18 season.

After three years with the Kings, Kendall joined the South East Melbourne Phoenix in a part-time player development role in 2019 for their inaugural NBL season. He was promoted to a full-time assistant coach for the 2020–21 season. He left the Phoenix in May 2022.

Kendall joined the Gujarat Stallions of the Indian National Basketball League (INBL) for the 2025 season. He led the team to the league championship.

Following the INBL season, Kendall joined the Casey Cavaliers of the NBL1 South as the head coach of the men's team for the 2025 NBL1 season. He was re-appointed by the Cavaliers as head coach for the 2026 season and again for the 2027 season.
