= Box Hill Senior Secondary College =

Coordinates: 37°48′37″S 145°06′47″E

- Box Hill, Victoria; Australia

Information
- Type: State school
- Principal: Nick Healy, Vice Principal: Christopher Christofidis
- Years offered: Year 9, Year 10, Year 11, Year 12 With All Years Able to choose a sports program of Tennis, AFL or Basketball.
- Gender: Co-Educational
- Enrollment: Approximately 350
- Colours: Navy and Gold
- Sports: AFL, Tennis, Basketball
- Mascot: Bane The Box Hill Kangaroo
- Website: http://www.bhssc.vic.edu.au/

Box Hill Senior Secondary College (BHSSC) is a state-run co-educational senior secondary school located in Box Hill, Victoria, Australia. The senior school has a four-year curriculum, composed of years nine to twelve, with those years also being able to select a sports program.

Box Hill Senior Secondary College has no feeder schools, new students are welcomed from all over Melbourne, but are only selected after interview.

Box Hill Senior Secondary College is also the location of the Middle Years Sports Campus, which was established in 2005. The Middle Years Sports Campus also includes an AFL football academy for Year 9 students. Students of the Middle Years Sports Campus have access to all Box Hill Senior Secondary College's facilities to help them learn.

== History ==
The college began operating as Box Hill Senior Secondary College in 1993. It was formerly Box Hill Technical School, a boys school founded in 1942 and first became coeducational in 1984 when it merged with the Whitehorse Girls Technical School.

== School uniform ==
Despite being a government school, the College does not have a set day to day uniform. However, there is a required sports uniform for students participating in the Sports Academy.

== Facilities and subjects ==
Students are able to integrate their chosen sport specialty with a wide range of academic pursuits. The college offers traditional academic studies in VCE, alongside VCE Vocational Major and VET studies, including pre-apprenticeship courses. Facilities at Box Hill Senior Secondary College include technology (Building and Electrical pre - apprenticeships, Plumbing and Horticulture), design, art, photography, music recording and multimedia centres and facilities, a commercial kitchen, a basketball stadium, indoor training facility for Netball and 9 tennis courts.

== Notable alumni ==
- 360 – Hip-hop artist
- Maddy Brancatisano – AFLW player
- Deng Deng – basketball player
- Luke Kendall – basketball coach and former player
- Emmanuel Malou – basketball player
- Rob Mills – entertainer
- Rebecca Ott – basketballer and AFLW player
- Mick Parker – mountaineer
- Ben Simmons – NBA Player
- Adrien Sturt – basketball player
- Jordan Vandenberg – basketball player
- Robbie Gray – AFL
- Taylin Duman
- Tilly Lucas-Rodd – AFLW player
- Matthew Bate – AFL Footballer
- James Parsons – AFL Footballer
- Nick Malceski – AFL Footballer
- Cameron Cloke – AFL footballer
- Jason Cloke – AFL footballer
- Anneli Maley – Basketballer

== Basketball Team Achievements ==
=== Championship Men (Open) ===
- Australian Schools Championships

(gold) Champions: 2017
(silver) Runners Up: 2019
(bronze) Third Place: 2011

=== Championship Women (Open) ===
- Australian Schools Championships

(gold) Champions: (2) 2016, 2019
(silver) Runners Up: 2011
(bronze) Third Place: 2015
