= Mick Parker =

Australian mountaineer (1973–2009)

Personal information
- Nationality: Australian
- Born: Michael Francis Parker; 10 March 1973 Melbourne, Australia
- Died: 4 June 2009 (aged 36) Kathmandu, Nepal
- Occupation: Mountaineer

Climbing career
- Major ascents: Cho Oyu (2003); Broad Peak (2004); Gasherbrum I (2007); Manaslu (2008); Makalu (2009)

Michael Francis Parker (10 March 1973 – 4 June 2009) was an Australian mountaineer. He successfully climbed the Seven Summits and five of the fourteen eight-thousanders. After ascending Makalu in 2009, he fell ill due to dissipated pulmonary and cerebral oedema and subsequently died in Kathmandu on 4 June, aged 36.

== Early life ==
Mick Parker was born in Box Hill, a suburb of Melbourne, to Gail and Bruce Parker. He attended Donburn Primary School and Wesley College, where he took up cross country running and rock climbing, before leaving school to study graphic arts at Box Hill Senior Secondary College.

== Climbing career ==
Parker's passion for climbing began in 1996 when he took an ice climbing course in New Zealand. In 2003 he climbed Cho Oyu's northwest face from Tibet after an unsuccessful attempt on Kangchenjunga. He summited Broad Peak for the first time in Pakistan in 2004 (he made a second unsuccessful attempt in 2006). In 2005, he made attempts to climb Mount Everest and K2, but failed in both. On K2, he chose to give up his chance of reaching the summit in order to bring an endangered Irish climber to safety and escort him back to base camp; on Everest, he was forced to retreat because of poor weather. In 2007, Parker joined the Australian Army Alpine Association—for whom he led numerous expeditions—on their attempt to climb Gasherbrum I in Pakistan. After leaving the rest of the team who decided to turn around, he continued climbing alone and reached the summit on 29 July, becoming the second Australian to have climbed the mountain. He also made a solo attempt on Dhaulagiri I in 2007, but abandoned the expedition after falling into a crevasse. In 2008, Parker made his second attempt on Manaslu in Nepal, reaching the summit on 14 May. Later that year, he returned to Dhaulagiri but was unsuccessful again.

== Death and legacy ==
Parker climbed Makalu with Roland Hunter in 2009, summiting on 21 May. Suffering from dissipated pulmonary and cerebral oedema, he fell unconscious several times on the return journey from Makalu to Kathmandu and ultimately died in Kathmandu on 4 June, aged 36. His father travelled to Nepal to retrieve Parker's body and bring it back to Melbourne, where Parker was buried in Lilydale Memorial Park. In 2010, Parker's family donated a collection of his climbing equipment to an exhibit at the National Sports Museum in Melbourne.

By the time of his death, Parker had attempted to climb nine of the fourteen peaks over 8,000 metres high, and had summited five—Cho Oyu, Broad Peak, Gasherbrum I, Manaslu, and Makalu—all without the assistance of Sherpa guides or bottled oxygen.
