= Geelong United Basketball =

Australian basketball team

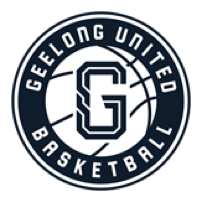
- Leagues: Big V; NBL1 South; Victorian Junior Basketball League; Women's National Basketball League
- Founded: 2019
- Arena: Beyond Bank Stadium; Geelong Arena
- Location: Geelong, Victoria
- CEO: Mark Neeld
- Chairman: Jessica Chappell
- Website: Geelong United Basketball

Geelong United Basketball (GUB) is a basketball association in Geelong, Victoria.

The city of Geelong and its surrounding region had two large associations fighting for resources over a 20-year period. Basketball Geelong had a strong club competition focusing on junior programs where as Corio Bay Basketball Association had a more adult-orientated program focusing on social basketball competitions. Geelong United Basketball was established in 2019 as a joint partnership of Basketball Geelong and Corio Bay.

GUB manages the Geelong United NBL1 program (formerly the Geelong Supercats) in the NBL1 South and enters teams in the Victorian Junior Basketball League (VJBL) and the Big V youth divisions. The organisation previously managed Country Basketball League (CBL) teams and the Corio Bay Stingrays in the Big V senior divisions.

In March 2024, Geelong United Basketball and a consortium of local private investors from Geelong expressed interest in acquiring the Melbourne Boomers' Women's National Basketball League (WNBL) licence. Two months later, the license was officially transferred to GUB, which saw the Geelong United WNBL team enter for the 2024–25 WNBL season. On 1 July 2025, GUB rebranded the WNBL team as Geelong Venom.

In October 2025, GUB was appointed as the new venue manager of Geelong Arena on a three-year deal.
