= Devonport Warriors =

Basketball club in Devonport, Tasmania, Australia

- Leagues: NBL (1983–1984); SEABL (1986–1993)
- Founded: 1949; 76 years ago
- History: Devonport Warriors; 1983–1984; 1986–1993
- Arena: Devonport Recreation Centre
- Location: Devonport, Tasmania
- Team colors: Dark green, navy blue, white
- Main sponsor: Jackson Ford
- President: Craig Martin
- Head coach: Phil Thomas (1983); Mark Leader (1984); Glenn Simonds (1987)
- Championships: 0
- Website: https://devonportwarriors.com.au

The Devonport Warriors are an amateur basketball club located in Devonport, Tasmania, Australia, best known for their tenures in the professional National Basketball League between 1983–1984 and the semi-professional South East Australian Basketball League (SEABL) between 1986–1993. As of 2024, the club facilitates both senior and junior men's and women's teams in the North West Basketball Union (NWBU), and boasts over 1,000 members.

The club also operates as the Devonport Basketball Association, serving as the primary basketball governing body in the city under Basketball Tasmania.

The Warriors play their home games at the Devonport Recreation Centre. Since their establishment, the Warriors have actively sought to promote basketball and develop the city's basketball infrastructure, notably supporting the Devonport Youth Centre in 1956, the Devonport Sports Stadium in 1963, and the proposed $60 million, 2,000-seat court within the Devonport Sports Precinct in 2024.

== History ==
The Devonport Warriors were established in 1949 by George Russell, coinciding with the formation of the Devonport Basketball Association. The club captured its first NWBU championship in the inaugural season of 1974.

=== National Championships ===
In 1974, the Warriors' under-14 boys team, coached by Glenn Simonds, became the first Tasmanian basketball team to claim a national title, defeating North Queensland.

=== NBL tenure (1983–1984) ===
Nationally, the Warriors are best known for competing in the National Basketball League in 1983 and 1984. The Warriors were the shortest-lived team in league history.

The team set the record for the fewest points scored in a game, losing to the Hobart Devils 85–40 on 12 February 1983, and suffered one of the greatest margin losses in NBL history, losing 128–66 to the Brisbane Bullets on 3 June 1984. They recorded both one of the highest and lowest field goal percentages in league history, achieving 70% shooting against the Geelong Supercats in 1983 and 30% against the Brisbane Bullets in 1984. Although the Warriors only won four games in the 1984 season, three of their wins came consecutively between 24 April and 12 May, and they won their last game of the season, which was at Devonport Stadium.

The Warriors were forced to exit the NBL after the league made the decision to reduce the number of teams from 17 to 14 for the 1985 NBL season. Devonport is considered rare for defunct NBL teams as they did not leave the league due to financial hardship. Despite the club's short tenure, the Warriors featured US import Mark Leader, who was player-coach in 1984, and Tasmanian native Marty Clarke.

==== Season by season ====
Devonport Warriors NBL logo 1983–1984

NBL champions	League champions	Runners-up	Finals berth

Season	Tier	League	Regular season					Post-season	Head coach
Season	Tier	League	Finish	Played	Wins	Losses	Win %	Post-season	Head coach
Devonport Warriors
1983	1	NBL	8th	22	2	20	.091	Did not qualify	Phil Thomas
1984	1	NBL	7th	23	4	19	.174	Did not qualify	Mark Leader
Regular season record				45	6	39	.133	0 regular season champions	
Finals record				0	0	0	.000	0 NBL championships	

As of the end of the 1984 season

*Note: In 1983 and 1984, the NBL was split into Eastern and Western divisions during the regular season.

=== South East Australian Basketball League (1986–1993) ===
Following their exit from the NBL, the Warriors transitioned to the South East Australian Basketball League (SEABL), a semi-professional basketball league. Devonport debuted in the SEABL in 1986. Amalgamating with clubs in surrounding North West Tasmania townships, the SEABL team would ultimately expand and diverge from the Warriors namesake. North-West Tasmania Thunder made their SEABL debut in 1994, and made the SEABL playoffs for the first time under former Warriors coach Phil Thomas.
