= Eltham Wildcats =

- Leagues: NBL1 South
- Founded: 1982
- History: Men: Eltham Wildcats; 1982–1984; 1997–present Women: Eltham Wildcats; 1985; 1987–present
- Arena: Montmorency Secondary College
- Location: Montmorency, Victoria
- Team colors: Red, black, white
- CEO: Steven Chadd (interim)
- President: Peter Meehan
- Head coach: M: Craig Stratford; W: Matt Bongetti
- Championships: Men: NBL1 South (1): 2024; Women: VWC/CVIBL (2): 1987; 1990; Big V (3): 2005; 2011; 2012
- Website: NBL1.com.au

Eltham Wildcats is a NBL1 South club based in Melbourne, Victoria. The club fields a team in both the Men's and Women's NBL1 South. The club is a division of the overarching Eltham Wildcats Basketball Club, the major administrative basketball organisation in the Eltham region. The Wildcats play their home games at Montmorency Secondary College.

== Club history ==
=== Background ===
Eltham Wildcats Basketball Club was founded in 1964 at Eltham High School by teacher David Hickman.

=== SEABL and Big V ===
In 1982, the Eltham Wildcats men's team debuted in the South East Australian Basketball League (SEABL), finishing their first season in 13th place with a 5–12 record. In their second season in 1983, Eltham finished in 15th place with a 3–19 record. Known as Eltham/Coburg in 1984, the team finished their third SEABL season in 11th place with a 9–17 record. Eltham ceased to compete in the SEABL men's competition from 1985 onwards after combining with other clubs to create the North East Melbourne Arrows.

The Eltham Wildcats women's team made a one-season appearance in the Women's Basketball Conference (WBC) in 1985. Their next appearance came in 1987 when they won the inaugural Victorian Women's Conference (VWC) championship. They went on to finish as VWC runners-up in 1988. After the league rebranded to the Country Victorian Invitation Basketball League (CVIBL) in 1989, Eltham won the CVIBL Division One championship in 1990 and earned runners-up honours in 1991. In 1992, Eltham entered the SEABL women's competition for the first time. In their first SEABL season, the Wildcats women finished in fourth place with a 12–8 record. They finished fifth in 1993 with a 11–9 record, before finishing fourth again in 1994 with a 17–9 record. In 1995, they finished second with a 21–5 record. Eltham ceased to compete in the SEABL women's competition from 1996 onwards. While playing in the SEABL, Eltham continued to have a women's team playing in the CVIBL Division One in 1993, 1994 and 1995.

In 1996, the Eltham women competed in the league below the CVIBL Premier Division. In 1997, the women continued in the CVIBL second division while a men's team made a return and played in the Victorian Basketball League (VBL) second division. In 1998, the women's CVIBL became known as the VBL; the women and men continued in the second divisions. This was followed by both the men and women entering the VBL Premier Division in 1999.

In 2000, the Wildcats were inaugural members of the Big V Championship Division. The women's team made their first Big V grand final in 2004, finishing as runners-up with a 2–1 series loss to the Melbourne Tigers. In 2005, women's team returned to the grand final, where they won their maiden Big V championship with a 2–1 series win over the Sandringham Sabres.

In 2011, both the men's and women's teams reached the Big V grand final. While the men lost to the Waverley Falcons, the women won the championship over the Melbourne Tigers. In 2012, both teams returned to the grand final, with the men losing to the Ringwood Hawks and women once again winning the championship over the Melbourne Tigers. In 2018, the men reached their first Big V grand final since 2012, where they lost to the Ringwood Hawks.

=== NBL1 ===
Following the 2018 Big V season, the Wildcats were granted entry into the NBL1 for the league's inaugural season in 2019. The club had resisted the urge to join the SEABL during the 2010s because of the costs involved, focusing instead on investment in facilities, including upgrades at Montmorency Secondary College and Eltham High School. The NBL1 South season did not go ahead in 2020 due to the COVID-19 pandemic.

In the 2024 NBL1 season, the Wildcats men won the NBL1 South championship with a 79–70 grand final victory over the Ballarat Miners.

In the 2026 NBL1 season, the Wildcats men returned to the NBL1 South Grand Final, where they were defeated 78–75 by the Frankston Blues.
