= Glen Eira Sports and Aquatic Centre =

Aquatic centre in Victoria, Australia

Coordinates: 37°54′57″S 145°03′39″E

- Interactive map of Glen Eira Sports and Aquatic Centre
- Former names: East Bentleigh Swimming Pool
- Location: 200 East Boundary Road, East Bentleigh, 3165
- Owner: Glen Eira City Council
- Operator: Glen Eira City Council
- Facilities: 25 metre Indoor Pool, 50 metre Outdoor Pool, Two Water slides, Leisure Pool, Hot Water Pool, Spa, Sauna, Steam room, Gymnasium, 4 group exercise studios, 3 court indoor sports stadium, childcare centre, cafe, consulting suites.

Construction
- Opened: 7 May 2012
- Cost: $44 million
- Architect: Mantric

Website
- www.geleisure.com.au

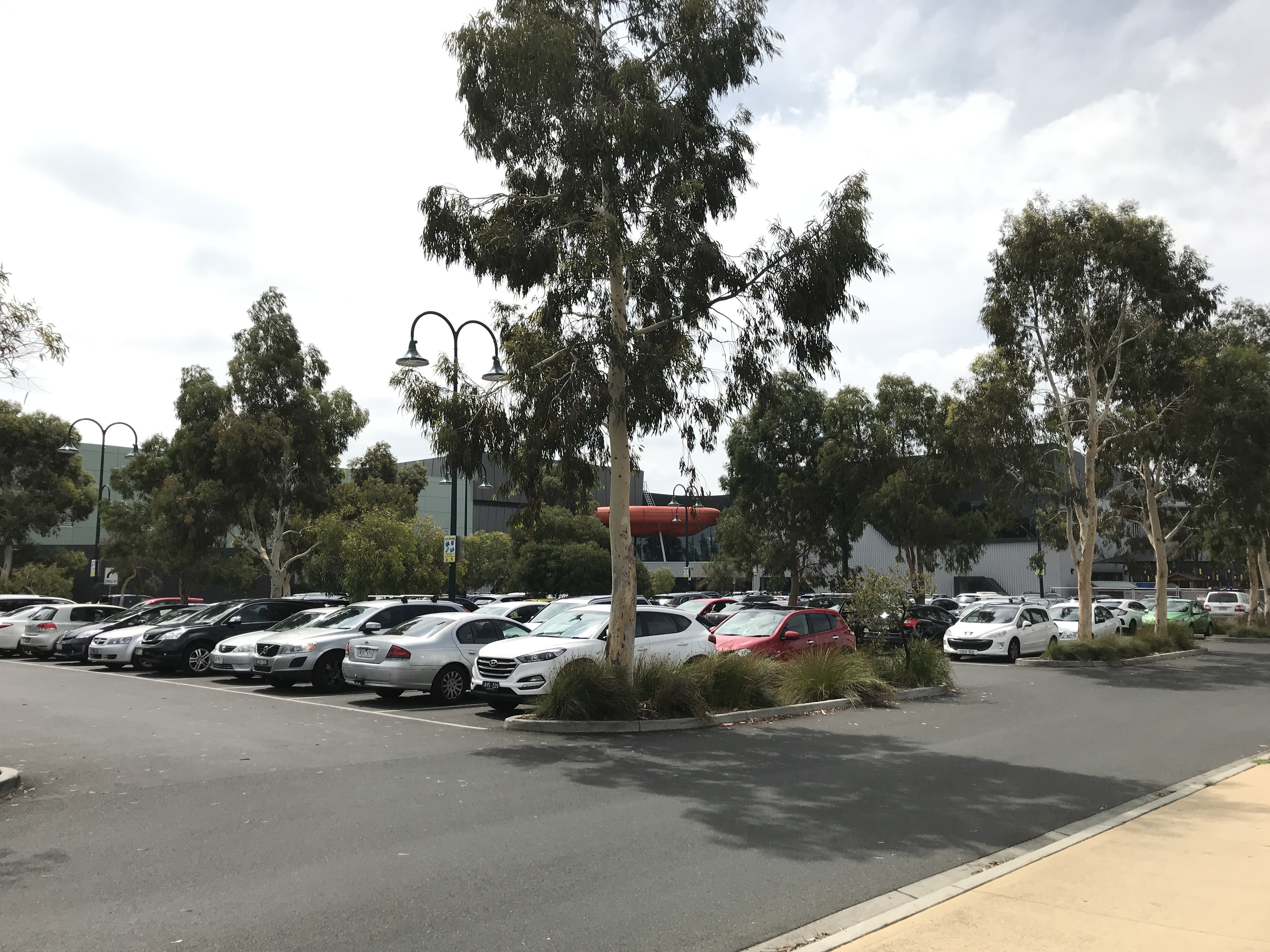
Glen Eira Sports and Aquatic Centre

Glen Eira Sports and Aquatic Centre (GESAC) is an aquatic centre in Victoria, Australia, that was developed by Hansen Yuncken and is owned by City of Glen Eira. It is a rival to Melbourne Sports and Aquatic Centre as it contains a 50-metre outdoor pool, 25 metre indoor pool, water slides, leisure pools, gymnasium and a stadium. It was constructed at a total cost of $44m dollars, with significant contributions from Federal and Victorian State Governments.

It is the first indoor pool in Glen Eira.

== History ==
In 2009, construction was approved and the pool had started to develop. It was opened on Monday 7 May 2012 at 6:00am.
