= Geelong Arena =

Sports venue in Geelong, Victoria

- Interactive map of Geelong Arena
- Former names: The Arena; Geelong Basketball Centre
- Location: 110 Victoria Street, North Geelong, Victoria 2292
- Coordinates: 38°7′24″S 144°21′5″E
- Owner: City of Greater Geelong
- Operator: Geelong United Basketball
- Capacity: Basketball / Netball: 2,000
- Surface: Sprung wooden floors

Tenants
- Geelong Supercats (NBL) (1982–1996); Geelong Supercats/United (SEABL/NBL1) (1997–present); Geelong Venom (WNBL) (2024–present)

Website
- microkeeperarena.com.au

Geelong Arena (also known as Microkeeper Arena under naming rights) is a multi-use sports and entertainment venue in Geelong, Victoria. The building was constructed in the 1950s as a wool store for The Australian Mercantile Land and Finance Company and was later called Elliott's wool store.

After its conversion into a venue named the Geelong Arena, it served as the home venue for the Geelong Supercats, a men's basketball team, who played in the National Basketball League (NBL) between 1982 and 1996. It is currently the home venue for Geelong United Basketball's elite programs in the Women's National Basketball League (WNBL) and NBL1 South.

Since 1996, the venue has hosted a number of NBL and WNBL games. It also hosted basketball games during the 2006 Commonwealth Games.

The arena has the majority of its 2,000 seating capacity on the broadcast side of the court with two smaller sections at each end plus two levels of corporate boxes on the opposite to the broadcast side. The venue has four courts.

In 2023, Geelong United Basketball (GUB) revealed plans to bid for management rights of Geelong Arena. In October 2025, GUB was appointed as the new venue manager of Geelong Arena on a three-year deal.

In October 2026, the Arena signed a naming rights sponsorship deal with Geelong-born workforce management and payroll software company Microkeeper. This coincided with the repainting of the venue's exterior from navy blue to red.
