= Marty Clarke (basketball) =

Australian basketball player and coach

Personal information
- Born: 22 May 1967 (age 59) Penguin, Tasmania
- Listed height: 189 cm (6 ft 2 in)
- Listed weight: 84 kg (185 lb)

Career information
- Playing career: 1984–1992
- Position: Guard
- Coaching career: 1993–2018

Career history

Playing
- 1984: Devonport Warriors
- 1985–1987: Australian Institute of Sport
- 1988–1992: North Melbourne Giants

Coaching
- 1998–2002: Australian Institute of Sport (assistant)
- 2003–2010: Australian Institute of Sport
- 2010–2013: Adelaide 36ers
- 2013–2018: Saint Mary's Gaels (assistant)

Career highlights
- NBL champion (1989)

Martin John Clarke (born 22 May 1967) is an Australian former professional basketball player and coach. He is most notably the former head coach of the National Basketball League's Adelaide 36ers and assistant coach of the Australian Boomers at the 2012 London Olympics. In 2018, Clarke was hired as the director of the NBA Global Academy at the Basketball Australia Centre of Excellence in Canberra.

== Playing career ==
As a player, Clarke was a Guard who originally played for the Devonport Warriors in the Tasmanian State League in 1984. He was then offered a scholarship at the Australian Institute of Sport (AIS) where he played for the AIS men's team in the South East Australian Basketball League (SEABL) from 1985 to 1987. While attending the AIS, Clarke captained the Australian Under-19 team to fifth place at the 1987 FIBA Under-19 World Championship held in Bormio, Italy.

Marty Clarke then joined the NBL's North Melbourne Giants in 1988, playing 120 games with the club until retiring at the end of the 1992 season. His time at the Giants included winning the 1989 NBL Championship over the Canberra Cannons with a 2–1 series win. The win reversed the Grand Final result of the previous season where the Cannons had defeated the Giants 2–0.

== Coaching career ==
After retiring from playing, Marty Clarke began his coaching career in his native Tasmania, where he coached in the Tasmanian State League from 1993–1997. In 1996, he was appointed as Head Coach at the Tasmanian Intensive Training Centre program, a position he held until 1998.

=== Australian Institute of Sport ===
Clarke then relocated to Australia's capital city Canberra, where from 1998-2002 he was the Assistant Coach at the Australian Institute of Sport. He was then named as head coach of the AIS from 2003–2010. Clarke was also Australian National Junior Team Assistant Coach from 2001–2003, and Head Coach from 2005–2009, coaching such players as current NBA players Andrew Bogut and Patrick Mills along with European-based Aussie Boomers Brad Newley and Joe Ingles.

=== Adelaide 36ers ===
On 29 March 2010, Clarke took up a three-year role with the Adelaide 36ers as head coach starting in the 2010–11 NBL season. Despite his previous coaching experience, it was his first time in charge of a professional team at club level. His first two seasons as 36ers coach were far from successful. The four-time championship winning club was coming off its first ever wooden spoon in 2009–10, and expectations were high for a move back up the competition ladder. However, the 36ers only improved to 8th in 2010–11, and, for the first time the club failed to win at least 10 games in an NBL season, finishing with a 9–19 record. His second season as an NBL coach would also prove to be of little joy as the club slumped to its second ever wooden spoon with an 8–20 record. The 2011–12 NBL season also saw the 36ers endure a club record eight game losing streak

Going into the 2012–13 NBL season, much was expected of the Clarke coached 36ers who had recruited well (helped by the demise of the Gold Coast Blaze) with players such as Adam Gibson, Anthony Petrie and Jason Cadee joining the club and many experts pre-season predictions had Adelaide as top-3 contenders. The team started the season well, with a 5–4 record after two months of the season and a place in the top 4 after Round 8 This included back to back wins over the Perth Wildcats, with the second win seeing Adelaide spoil the Wildcats first game at the new 14,856 seat Perth Arena on 16 November. This would prove to be the 36ers last win for the 2012 calendar year as they embarked on another eight game losing streak and slumped to a 5–11 record by the end of Round 14.

Following the club's record equalling eighth loss in a row (against the Sydney Kings at the Sydney Entertainment Centre) on 5 January, speculation was rife in the Adelaide media that Clarke would be replaced as 36ers head coach, though the club's owners and management remained tight lipped on the situation. Following the loss to Sydney, the 36ers played the Kings at home the following week. The team stopped its slide with an 82–64 win, after which the club released a statement telling Clarke would see out his contract.

On 4 April 2013, Clarke's contract was not renewed with the 36ers, parting ways with the club after 3 seasons having led the team to a second last place finish and two consecutive wooden spoons.

=== Australian Boomers ===
On 8 March 2011, Marty Clarke was named as Assistant Coach of the Australian Boomers. Clarke replaced outgoing assistant Shane Heal who stepped down from the position due to time constraints. Clarke joined then head coach Brett Brown (who resigned as coach following the 2012 London Olympics citing wanting to spend more time with his family and also his job as assistant coach with the NBA's San Antonio Spurs), and fellow assistants Andrej Lemanis (New Zealand Breakers head coach), and technical assistant Mo Dakhil.

=== Saint Mary's ===
After not being re-signed as coach of the Adelaide 36ers, Marty Clarke was hired as an assistant coach for the Saint Mary's Gaels (the former college of Boomers Patty Mills and Matthew Dellavedova) who play in the West Coast Conference of the NCAA.

== Coaching record ==
=== NBL ===
Legend
Regular season	G	Games coached	W	Games won	L	Games lost	W–L %	Win–loss %
Playoffs	PG	Playoff games	PW	Playoff wins	PL	Playoff losses	PW–L %	Playoff win–loss %

Team	Year	G	W	L	W–L%	Finish	PG	PW	PL	PW–L%	Result
Adelaide 36ers	2010–11	28	9	19	.321	8th	—	—	—	—	Missed playoffs
Adelaide 36ers	2011–12	28	8	20	.286	9th	—	—	—	—	Missed playoffs
Adelaide 36ers	2012–13	28	8	20	.286	8th	—	—	—	—	Missed playoffs
Career		84	25	59	.298		—	—	—	—	
