= WNBL =

WNBL may refer to:

- WNBL (FM), a radio station (107.3 FM) licensed to serve South Bristol Township, New York, United States
- Women's National Basketball League, an Australian professional women's basketball league
- Women's National Basketball League (Philippines), a Filipino professional women's basketball league
- WNRJ (AM), a radio station (1200 AM) licensed to serve Huntington, West Virginia, United States, which used the call sign WNBL from 2010 to 2011
