= Bulleen Boomers (Big V) =

- Leagues: Big V
- Founded: 1981
- History: Men: Bulleen Boomers; 1981–1996; 1998–present Women: Bulleen Boomers; 1994–1995; 1998–present
- Arena: Sheahans Reserve Basketball Stadium
- Location: Bulleen, Victoria
- Team colors: Blue & gold
- President: Derek Pangbourne
- Vice-president(s): Roger Jeffrey
- General manager: Ryan Rogers
- Head coach: M: Umberto Fato; W: Mason Rogers
- Championships: Men: ABA (2): 1984; 1990; Women: Big V (2): 2023; 2025
- Conference titles: Men: SEABL (2): 1988; 1989
- Website: bulleenboomers.com.au

Bulleen Boomers is a Big V club based in Melbourne, Victoria. The club fields a team in both the Men's and Women's Big V. The club is a division of Bulleen-Templestowe Basketball Club (BTBC), the major administrative basketball organisation in the City of Manningham. The Boomers play their home games at Sheahans Reserve Basketball Stadium.

== Club history ==
=== Background and WNBL entry ===
Bulleen-Templestowe Basketball Club (BTBC) was established in 1969. The Bulleen Boomers WNBL team entered the Women's National Basketball League (WNBL) in the 1984 season after BTBC obtained a licence.

=== SEABL men's team ===
In 1981, the Boomers were inaugural members of the South East Australian Basketball League (SEABL). In 1983, the Boomers finished second in the SEABL regular season and went on to reach the ABA National grand final, where they were defeated by the Melbourne Tigers. In 1984, the Boomers again finished second in the SEABL regular season and returned to the ABA National grand final, where they won the National championship with a victory over the Chelsea Gulls. In 1985, the Boomers finished third in the SEABL regular season and made their third straight ABA National grand final, where they were defeated by the Kilsyth Cobras.

In 1988, the Boomers won the SEABL East Conference championship and returned to the ABA National grand final, where they lost to the Bendigo Braves. In 1989, the Boomers won their second straight SEABL East Conference championship. In 1990, the Boomers finished second in the SEABL South Conference regular season and went on to reach their fifth ABA National grand final, where they defeated the Ballarat Miners to win their second National championship. In 1992, American import guard Drederick Irving played for the Boomers under coach Brett Brown.

Following the 1996 season, the Boomers withdrew from the SEABL.

=== Big V ===
In 1994, a Bulleen state league women's team emerged in the Country Victorian Invitation Basketball League (CVIBL) Division One. They withdrew from the CVIBL following the 1995 season. In 1998, Bulleen's men's and women's teams joined the Victorian Basketball League's (VBL) second division. In 1999, the men's team was elevated to the VBL's Premier Division while the women's team won the championship in the VBL's second division.

In 2000, the Boomers were members of the inaugural Big V season. In 2001 and 2002, the women's team reached the Big V grand final, where they lost both times to the Ballarat Miners. In 2006, the men's team dropped down from Championship Division to Division One. In 2009, the men's team reached the Division One grand final series, where they lost 2–0 to the Sunbury Jets. They subsequently returned to Championship Division in 2010. In 2013, the men's team finished as minor premiers but lost in the semi-finals. Future NBA player Ben Simmons featured for the Boomers during the 2013 season. In 2017, the men's team was relegated to Division One. That year, the women's team reached the Championship Division grand final series, where they lost 2–0 to the Sunbury Jets.

In 2022, the women's team reached the Big V Championship Division grand final series, where they lost 2–0 to the Wyndham Devils. In 2023, the team won the Big V title with an 84–79 overtime victory over Wyndham in the grand final. The team returned to the grand final in 2024 and faced Wyndham for the third straight year, where they lost 50–48. The Boomers women reached their fourth straight grand final in 2025, where they won their second Big V championship with a 71–55 win over the Bellarine Storm.
