= List of Big V champions =

The champion teams of the Big V are determined annually by a grand final, traditionally a best-of-three championship series hosted by Basketball Victoria.

== Champions ==
=== Results by year ===
Year	Men's Champion	Result	Men's Runner-up	Women's Champion	Result	Women's Runner-up	Ref
2000	Shepparton Gators	110–101	Warrnambool Seahawks	Ballarat Miners	79–67	Warrnambool Mermaids	
2001	Shepparton Gators	93–84	Sandringham Sabres	Ballarat Miners	87–84	Bulleen Boomers	
2002	Sandringham Sabres	2–0 (117–80, 135–129)	Shepparton Gators	Ballarat Miners	2–0 (76–68, 77–64)	Bulleen Boomers	
2003	Shepparton Gators	2–1 (104–102, 99–118, 105–91)	Sandringham Sabres	Melbourne Tigers	2–0 (?–?, 79–73)	Sandringham Sabres	
2004	Hume City Broncos	2–0 (96–90, 86–84)	Sandringham Sabres	Melbourne Tigers	2–1 (84–79, 44–68, 60–55)	Eltham Wildcats	
2005	Sandringham Sabres	2–0 (106–91, 118–85)	Dandenong Rangers	Eltham Wildcats	2–1 (68–79, 69–47, 62–41)	Sandringham Sabres	
2006	Dandenong Rangers	2–0 (103–85, 118–106)	Sandringham Sabres	Sandringham Sabres	2–0 (64–58, 60–47)	Dandenong Rangers	
2007	Dandenong Rangers	2–0 (93–75, 116–88)	Sandringham Sabres	Hume City Broncos	2–1 (75–62, 68–74, 80–66)	Waverley Falcons	
2008	Melbourne Tigers	2–0 (115–101, 125–105)	Sandringham Sabres	Hume City Broncos	2–1 (56–66, 85–75, 88–79)	Waverley Falcons	
2009	Melbourne Tigers	2–0 (120–94, 130–111)	Ringwood Hawks	Hume City Broncos	2–0 (74–46, 75–73)	Waverley Falcons	
2010	Waverley Falcons	2–1 (80–91, 86–58, 76–63)	Ringwood Hawks	Geelong Lady Cats	2–0 (76–69, 86–66)	Hume City Broncos	
2011	Waverley Falcons	2–0 (113–111, 75–73)	Eltham Wildcats	Eltham Wildcats	2–0 (60–56, 74–60)	Melbourne Tigers	
2012	Ringwood Hawks	2–0 (70–61, 86–78)	Eltham Wildcats	Eltham Wildcats	2–0 (66–56, 61–54)	Melbourne Tigers	
2013	Corio Bay Stingrays	2–0 (97–95, 91–86)	Ringwood Hawks	Hume City Broncos	2–1 (57–56, 71–74, 79–68)	Ringwood Hawks	
2014	Ringwood Hawks	2–1 (85–92, 91–83, 93–88)	Corio Bay Stingrays	Hume City Broncos	2–1 (53–67, 68–54, 65–59)	Ringwood Hawks	
2015	Corio Bay Stingrays	2–0 (82–80, 98–82)	McKinnon Cougars	Ringwood Hawks	2–1 (48–58, 65–58, 57–55)	Hume City Broncos	
2016	Ringwood Hawks	2–0 (95–70, 101–93)	Corio Bay Stingrays	Hume City Broncos	2–0 (69–59, 78–71)	Ringwood Hawks	
2017	Ringwood Hawks	2–0 (103–93, 101–99)	Waverley Falcons	Sunbury Jets	2–0 (71–65, 55–54)	Bulleen Boomers	
2018	Ringwood Hawks	2–1 (99–71, 77–96, 106–94)	Eltham Wildcats	Sunbury Jets	2–0 (85–50, 72–69)	Southern Peninsula Sharks	
2019	McKinnon Cougars	2–0 (110–98, 107–94)	Hume City Broncos	Werribee Devils	2–1 (77–64, 75–81, 67–61)	Keilor Thunder	
2020	Season cancelled due to COVID-19 pandemic						
2021	Season abandoned mid-season due to COVID-19 pandemic						
2022	Wyndham Devils	2–0 (106–68, 87–75)	Sunbury Jets	Wyndham Devils	2–0 (63–55, 86–70)	Bulleen Boomers	
2023	McKinnon Cougars	90–74	Hume City Broncos	Bulleen Boomers	84–79	Wyndham Devils	
2024	Wyndham Devils	80–79	McKinnon Cougars	Wyndham Devils	50–48	Bulleen Boomers	
2025	McKinnon Cougars	87–81	Hume City Broncos	Bulleen Boomers	71–55	Bellarine Storm	
2026	McKinnon Cougars	93–80	Hume City Broncos	McKinnon Cougars	113–61	Sherbrooke Suns	

=== Results by teams ===
Men			Women		
Teams		Year(s) won	Teams		Year(s) won
Ringwood Hawks	5	2012, 2014, 2016, 2017, 2018	Hume City Broncos	6	2007, 2008, 2009, 2013, 2014, 2016
McKinnon Cougars	4	2019, 2023, 2025, 2026	Ballarat Miners	3	2000, 2001, 2002
Shepparton Gators	3	2000, 2001, 2003	Eltham Wildcats	3	2005, 2011, 2012
Sandringham Sabres	2	2002, 2005	Werribee/Wyndham Devils	3	2019, 2022, 2024
Dandenong Rangers	2	2006, 2007	Melbourne Tigers	2	2003, 2004
Melbourne Tigers	2	2008, 2009	Sunbury Jets	2	2017, 2018
Waverley Falcons	2	2010, 2011	Bulleen Boomers	2	2023, 2025
Corio Bay Stingrays	2	2013, 2015	Sandringham Sabres	1	2006
Wyndham Devils	2	2022, 2024	Geelong Lady Cats	1	2010
Hume City Broncos	1	2004	Ringwood Hawks	1	2015
			McKinnon Cougars	1	2026
