= Ringwood Hawks =

Basketball team in Victoria, Australia

- Leagues: NBL1 South
- Founded: 1990
- History: Ringwood Hawks; 1990–present
- Arena: The Rings
- Location: Ringwood, Victoria
- Team colors: Green, black and white
- General manager: Ken Harrington
- Head coach: M: Damien Smith; W: Jeremy O'Toole
- Championships: 5 (1999, 2012, 2014, 2016, 2017, 2018) (M); 2 (2015, 2022) (W)
- Website: NBL1.com.au

Ringwood Hawks is a NBL1 South basketball club based in Melbourne, Victoria, Australia. The club fields a team in both the men's and women's NBL1 South. The club is a division of Ringwood Basketball Association (RBA), the major administrative basketball organisation in the Ringwood region. The Hawks play their home games at The Rings.

== Club history ==
Ringwood Basketball Association (RBA) was founded in 1990, with a men's team debuting in the Country Victorian Invitation Basketball League (CVIBL) that year followed by a women's team in 1991. In 1999, the men's team won the VBL Division One championship.

The Hawks were inaugural members of the Big V Championship Men's division in 2000, with the women's team joining Big V Championship Women in 2003. In 2009 and 2010, the men's team finished as Big V runners-up. In 2012, the men's team won their first Big V championship. After a runner-up finish in 2013, the men went on to win titles in 2014, 2016, 2017 and 2018. For the women, they played in four straight grand final series between 2013 and 2016, winning their maiden Big V championship in 2015.

In 2019, the Hawks joined the NBL1 for its inaugural season. The NBL1 South season did not go ahead in 2020 due to the COVID-19 pandemic. In the 2022 NBL1 season, the Hawks women won the NBL1 South championship and reached the grand final of the NBL1 National Finals.
