= List of NBL1 South champions =

The champion teams of the NBL1 South are determined annually by a grand final championship day hosted by Basketball Victoria. The grand final host venue was the State Basketball Centre in Melbourne in 2019, 2022 and 2023. In 2024, the grand final host venue was Dandenong Stadium. The grand final host venue returned to the redeveloped State Basketball Centre in 2025. The State Basketball Centre continued as the host venue in 2026.

== Champions ==
=== Results by year ===
Year	Men's Champion	Result	Men's Runner-up	Women's Champion	Result	Women's Runner-up
2019	Nunawading Spectres	99–90	Bendigo Braves	Kilsyth Cobras	86–76	Geelong Supercats
2020	Season cancelled					
2021	Season abandoned mid-season					
2022	Hobart Chargers	78–62	Mount Gambier Pioneers	Ringwood Hawks	89–73	Bendigo Braves
2023	Knox Raiders	90–86	Sandringham Sabres	Bendigo Braves	83–78	Waverley Falcons
2024	Eltham Wildcats	79–70	Ballarat Miners	Waverley Falcons	87–82	Keilor Thunder
2025	Sandringham Sabres	99–80	Melbourne Tigers	Knox Raiders	84–64	Geelong United
2026	Frankston Blues	78–75	Eltham Wildcats	Knox Raiders	80–54	Waverley Falcons

=== Results by teams ===
Team	Total Titles	Men's		Women's		Notes
Team	Total Titles	Titles	Winning seasons	Titles	Winning seasons	Notes
Knox Raiders	3	1	2023	2	2025, 2026	
Kilsyth Cobras	1	0		1	2019	Won the women's inaugural title in 2019.
Nunawading Spectres	1	1	2019	0		Won the men's inaugural title in 2019.
Ringwood Hawks	1	0		1	2022	
Hobart Chargers	1	1	2022	0		
Bendigo Braves	1	0		1	2023	
Waverley Falcons	1	0		1	2024	
Eltham Wildcats	1	1	2024	0		
Sandringham Sabres	1	1	2025	0		
Frankston Blues	1	1	2026	0		
