= Waverley Falcons =

- Leagues: NBL1 South
- Founded: 1982
- History: Waverley Falcons; 1982–present
- Arena: Waverley Basketball Centre
- Location: Chadstone, Victoria
- Team colors: Yellow, Green
- CEO: Mike Bullock
- President: Mike Bullock
- Vice-president: Greg Dean
- General manager: Elias Palioyiannis
- Head coach: M: Elias Palioyiannis; W: Tom Bandilovski
- Championships: Men: Big V (2): 2010; 2011; Women: CVIBL (1): 1994; NBL1 (1): 2024; NBL1 South (1): 2024
- Website: NBL1.com.au

Waverley Falcons is a NBL1 South club based in Melbourne, Victoria. The club fields a team in both the Men's and Women's NBL1 South. The club is a division of Waverley Basketball Association (WBA), the major administrative basketball organisation in the City of Monash. The Falcons play their home games at Waverley Basketball Centre.

== Club history ==
Waverley Basketball Association was established in 1976. Their representative division, the Waverley Falcons, was formed in 1982.

In 1994, the Falcons women won the Country Victorian Invitational Basketball League (CVIBL) championship. Waverley joined the Big V in 2000. Between 2007 and 2009, the women's team lost three straight Big V grand final series to the Hume City Broncos. In 2010 and 2011, the men's team won back-to-back Big V championships.

Waverley joined the NBL1 for its inaugural season in 2019. They did not play in 2020 after the 2020 NBL1 season was cancelled due to COVID-19 pandemic.

In the 2023 NBL1 season, the Falcons women reached their first NBL1 South Grand Final, where they lost 83–78 to the Bendigo Braves. In the 2024 season, the women's team returned to the NBL1 South Grand Final, where they won the NBL1 South championship with an 87–82 victory over the Keilor Thunder. They went on to win the NBL1 National championship at the 2024 NBL1 National Finals after defeating the Bendigo Braves 97–49 in the grand final. The team returned to the NBL1 National Finals in 2025 as the defending champions, where they lost to the Knox Raiders in the semifinal.

In 2026, the women's team reached the NBL1 South Grand Final, where they lost 80–54 to the Knox Raiders. With Knox already guaranteed a place at the 2026 National Finals as defending champions, the Falcons qualified once again as the other South Conference women's grand finalist. It marked the Falcons' third consecutive National Finals appearance.
