= Sandringham Sabres =

- Leagues: NBL1 South
- Founded: 2000
- History: Sandringham Sabres; 2000–present
- Arena: Southern Basketball Stadium
- Location: Cheltenham, Victoria
- Team colors: Orange & navy
- CEO: Craig Weir
- President: Phil McFarlane
- Head coach: M: David Barlow; W: Cheryl Chambers
- Championships: 3 (2002, 2005, 2025) (M); 1 (2006) (W)
- Website: NBL1.com.au

Sandringham Sabres is a NBL1 South club based in Melbourne, Victoria. The club fields a team in both the Men's and Women's NBL1 South. The club is a division of Southern Basketball Association (SBA), the major administrative basketball organisation in the Sandringham region. The Sabres play their home games at Southern Basketball Stadium.

== Club history ==
Southern Basketball Association (SBA) was founded in 1974 and was located in Waltham Street, Sandringham. The association later moved to Tulip Street, Cheltenham.

In 2000, the SBA entered a men's team and a women's team into the Big V Championship divisions. Between 2001 and 2008, the men made a Big V grand final appearance every year, winning championships in 2002 and 2005. The women on the other hand made grand final appearances in 2003, 2005 and 2006, winning their first championship in 2006.

In 2009, both teams were elevated from the Big V into the South East Australian Basketball League (SEABL).

In 2019, following the demise of the SEABL, the Sabres joined the NBL1 South. The NBL1 South season did not go ahead in 2020 due to the COVID-19 pandemic.

In 2023, the men's team lost in the NBL1 South grand final to the Knox Raiders. In 2025, the men's team returned to the NBL1 South grand final, where they defeated the Melbourne Tigers 99–80 to win the championship.
