= Victorian Basketball League =

Australian semi-pro basketball league

- Formerly: Big V 2000–2026
- Sport: Basketball
- Founded: 2000
- First season: 2000
- No. of teams: Men: 11; Women: 10
- Country: Australia
- Continent: FIBA Oceania (Oceania)
- Most recent champions: Men: McKinnon Cougars (4th title); Women: McKinnon Cougars (1st title)
- Most titles: Men: Ringwood Hawks (5 titles); Women: Hume City Broncos (6 titles)
- Website: BasketballVictoria.com.au

The Victorian Basketball League (VBL), formerly the Big V, is a semi-professional basketball league in Victoria, Australia, comprising both a men's and women's competition.

The VBL's premier divisions are Championship Men and Championship Women. The league also has Division One and Division Two as well as a number of youth divisions.

== History ==
=== Precursor league (1987–1999) ===
In 1987, a precursor league to the Big V was established. A women's competition was introduced first followed by a men's competition in 1989. It was known by many names, including Victorian Women's Conference, Country Victorian Invitation Basketball League (CVIBL), and finally the Victorian Basketball League (VBL) in the late 1990s. Following the establishment of the Big V in 2000, VBL Division One and Division Two transitioned underneath Big V Championship Men and Championship Women.

=== Big V (2000–2026) ===
The Big V was established in 2000 as a new Australian Basketball Association (ABA) conference. The Big V remained a member of the ABA until the conclusion of the 2008 season, when the ABA ceased operations, making the Big V an independent competition for the first time.

The 2020 Big V season was cancelled due to the COVID-19 pandemic. The 2021 season was abandoned mid-season due to the same reason.

=== Victorian Basketball League (2027–) ===
In September 2026, the Big V was rebranded as the Victorian Basketball League for the 2027 season.

== Current teams ==
=== Men ===
| Colours | Club | Location | Stadium |
|---|---|---|---|
| | Bellarine Storm | Drysdale | Bellarine Secondary College Drysdale Campus |
| | Camberwell Dragons | Balwyn North | Boroondara Sports Complex |
| | Gippsland United | Traralgon | Gippsland Regional Indoor Sports Stadium |
| | Hume City Broncos | Broadmeadows | Broadmeadows Basketball Stadium |
| | McKinnon Cougars | Bentleigh East | Glen Eira Sports and Aquatic Centre (GESAC) |
| | Melbourne University | Parkville | Melbourne University Sports Centre |
| | Pakenham Warriors | Pakenham | Cardinia Life |
| | RMIT Redbacks | Bundoora | RMIT Sports Centre |
| | Sunbury Jets | Sunbury | Boardman Stadium |
| | Warrandyte Venom | Warrandyte | Warrandyte Sports Complex |
| | Wyndham Devils | Werribee | Eagle Stadium |

=== Women ===
| Colours | Club | Location | Stadium |
|---|---|---|---|
| | Bellarine Storm | Drysdale | Bellarine Secondary College Drysdale Campus |
| | Bulleen Boomers | Bulleen | Bulleen Templestowe Basketball Stadium |
| | Hume City Broncos | Broadmeadows | Broadmeadows Basketball Stadium |
| | McKinnon Cougars | Bentleigh East | Glen Eira Sports and Aquatic Centre (GESAC) |
| | Pakenham Warriors | Pakenham | Cardinia Life |
| | Sherbrooke Suns | Upwey | Upwey Basketball Stadium |
| | Sunbury Jets | Sunbury | Boardman Stadium |
| | Warrandyte Venom | Warrandyte | Warrandyte Sports Complex |
| | Warrnambool Mermaids | Warrnambool | Warrnambool Stadium |
| | Western Port Steelers | Somerville | Somerville Recreation Centre |

== List of Champions ==
| Men | | | Women | | |
| Teams | | Year(s) won | Teams | | Year(s) won |
|---|---|---|---|---|---|
| Ringwood Hawks | 5 | 2012, 2014, 2016, 2017, 2018 | Hume City Broncos | 6 | 2007, 2008, 2009, 2013, 2014, 2016 |
| McKinnon Cougars | 4 | 2019, 2023, 2025, 2026 | Ballarat Miners | 3 | 2000, 2001, 2002 |
| Shepparton Gators | 3 | 2000, 2001, 2003 | Eltham Wildcats | 3 | 2005, 2011, 2012 |
| Sandringham Sabres | 2 | 2002, 2005 | Werribee/Wyndham Devils | 3 | 2019, 2022, 2024 |
| Dandenong Rangers | 2 | 2006, 2007 | Melbourne Tigers | 2 | 2003, 2004 |
| Melbourne Tigers | 2 | 2008, 2009 | Sunbury Jets | 2 | 2017, 2018 |
| Waverley Falcons | 2 | 2010, 2011 | Bulleen Boomers | 2 | 2023, 2025 |
| Corio Bay Stingrays | 2 | 2013, 2015 | Sandringham Sabres | 1 | 2006 |
| Wyndham Devils | 2 | 2022, 2024 | Geelong Lady Cats | 1 | 2010 |
| Hume City Broncos | 1 | 2004 | Ringwood Hawks | 1 | 2015 |
| | | | McKinnon Cougars | 1 | 2026 |

=== CVIBL/VBL champions (1987–1999) ===
| Year | Division One Men | Division One Women | Ref |
|---|---|---|---|
| 1987 | | Eltham | |
| 1988 | | Coburg | |
| 1989 | Swan Hill | Broadmeadows | |
| 1990 | Mildura | Eltham | |
| 1991 | Horsham | Bendigo | |
| 1992 | Werribee | Bendigo | |
| 1993 | Werribee | Heyfield | |
| 1994 | Shepparton | Waverley | |
| 1995 | Werribee | Ballarat | |
| 1996 | Werribee | Ballarat | |
| 1997 | Warrnambool | Ballarat | |
| 1998 | Warrnambool | Ballarat | |
| 1999 | Ringwood | Ballarat | |
