= List of 2020–21 NBL season transactions =

This is a list of transactions that have taken place during the 2020 NBL off-season and the 2020–21 NBL season.

== Retirements ==
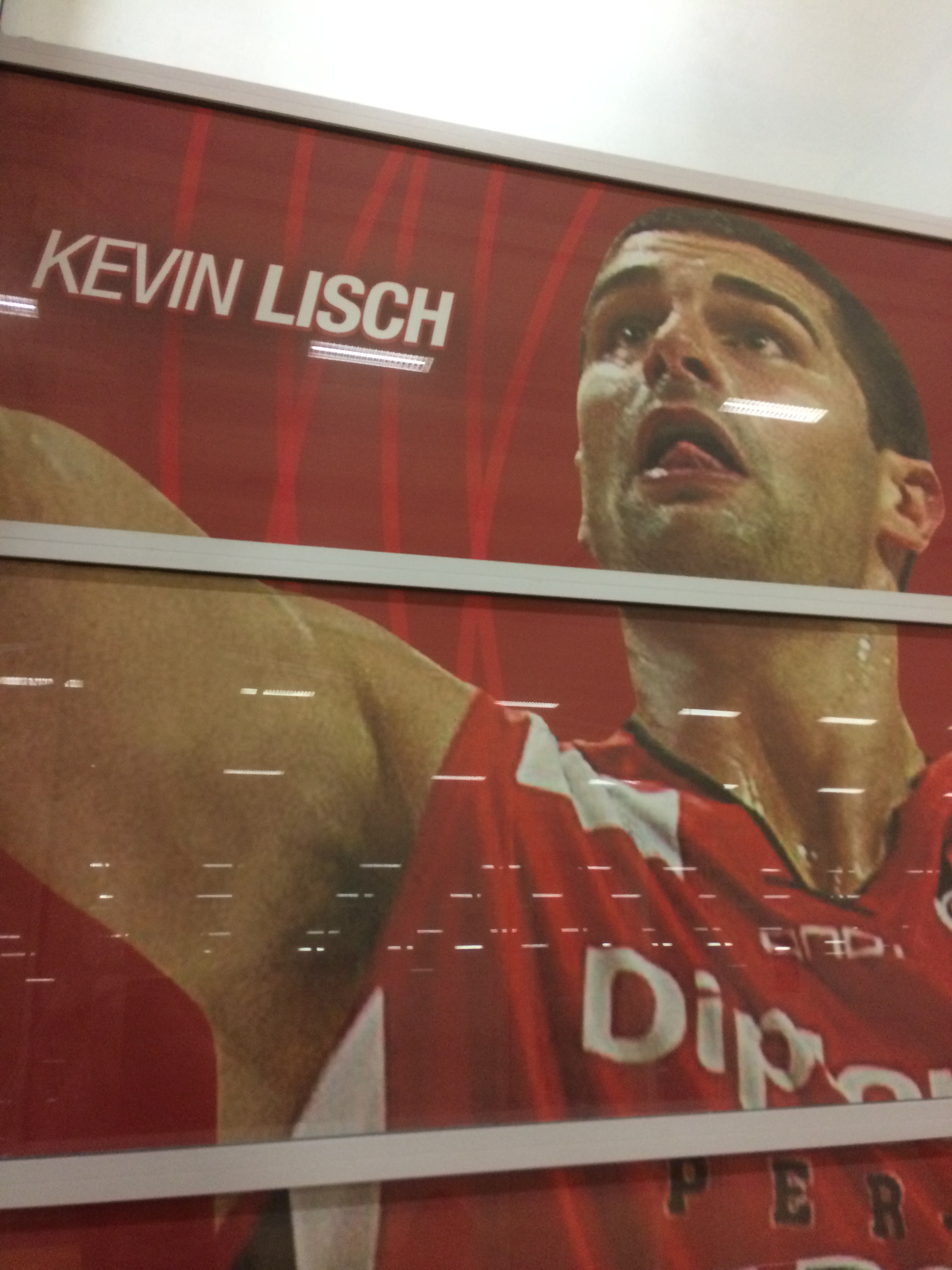
Kevin Lisch with the Perth Wildcats

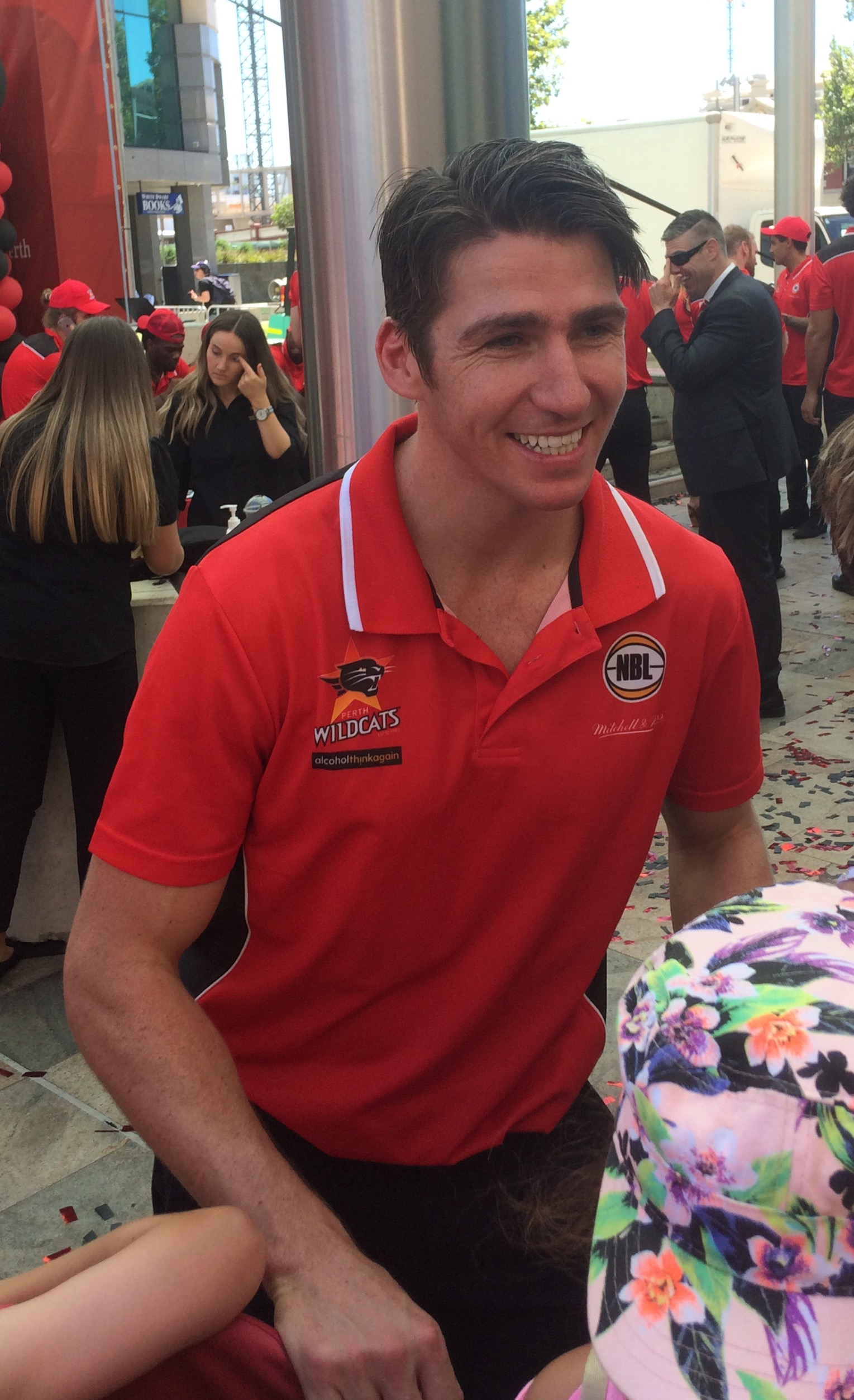
Damian Martin with the Perth Wildcats in 2017

Date	Name	Team(s) played (years)	Age	Notes	Ref.
9 June	Kevin Lisch	Perth Wildcats (2009–2013); Illawarra Hawks (2015–2016); Sydney Kings (2016–2020)	34	NBL champion (2010); NBL Grand Final MVP (2010); 2 x NBL MVP (2012, 2016); NBL Best Defensive Player Award (2016); 3 x All-NBL First Team (2011–2013, 2016); All-NBL Second Team (2017)	
7 July	Tai Wesley	New Zealand Breakers (2014–2016, 2018–2019); Melbourne United (2016–2018); South East Melbourne Phoenix (2019–2020)	34	2 x NBL champion (2015, 2018); All-NBL Second Team (2018)	
13 July	Ben Madgen	Sydney Kings (2010–2015); South East Melbourne Phoenix (2019–2020)	35	All-NBL First Team (2013); NBL Most Improved (2013); NBL scoring champion (2013); NBL Rookie of the Year (2011)	
21 July	Damian Martin	Perth Wildcats (2009–2020)	35	6 x NBL champion (2010, 2014, 2016, 2017, 2019, 2020); NBL Grand Final MVP (2016); 6 x NBL Best Defensive Player (2010–2015, 2018); All-NBL First Team (2011); 2 x All-NBL Second Team (2013, 2014); All-NBL Third Team (2012)	
29 September	Obi Kyei	Adelaide 36ers (2019–2020)	25		
27 November	Tim Coenraad	Wollongong / Illawarra Hawks (2009–2020)	35		
1 December	Andrew Bogut	Sydney Kings (2018–2020)	36	NBL MVP (2019); NBL Best Defensive Player (2019); All-NBL First Team (2019) All-NBL Second Team (2020)	
1 February	Lucas Walker	Melbourne Tigers/United (2010–2015); Adelaide 36ers (2015–16); Perth Wildcats (2016–2018); Cairns Taipans (2018–19); Sydney Kings (2019–20)	36	NBL champion (2017)	

== Front office movements ==
=== Coaching changes ===
Team	Position	Departure date	Outgoing Coach	Reason for Departure	Hire date	Incoming Coach	Last coaching position	Ref.
Adelaide 36ers	Head Coach	26 February	Joey Wright	Mutual agreement	22 April	Conner Henry	Orlando Magic assistant coach (2015–2016)	
Adelaide 36ers	Assistant Coach	Unknown	Kevin Brooks	Unknown	18 August	Jamie Pearlman	Kuala Lumpur Dragons Head Coach (2018–2020)	
Adelaide 36ers	Assistant Coach	Unknown	Darren Golley	Unknown	N/A			
Adelaide 36ers	Assistant Coach	Unknown	Andrew Jantke	Unknown	N/A			
Brisbane Bullets	Assistant Coach	Unknown	Sam Mackinnon	Unknown	Unknown	Greg Vanderjagt	Townsville Crocodiles assistant coach (2015–2016)	
Brisbane Bullets	Assistant Coach	Unknown	Mick Downer	Unknown	N/A			
Illawarra Hawks	Head Coach	Unknown	Matt Flinn	New owners	23 June	Brian Goorjian	Xinjiang Flying Tigers Head Coach (2018–2019)	
Illawarra Hawks	Assistant Coach	Unknown	Ben Bagoly	New owners	3 July	Jacob Jackomas	Shanghai Sharks assistant coach (2016–2017)	
Illawarra Hawks	Assistant Coach	Unknown	Eric Cooks	New owners	Unknown	Shaun Roger	N/A	
Illawarra Hawks	Assistant Coach	Unknown	Tyson Demos	New owners	N/A			
Melbourne United	Assistant Coach	21 August	Ross McMains	Unknown	23 December	Darryl McDonald	Melbourne United Head Coach (2014–2015)	
New Zealand Breakers	Assistant Coach	Unknown	Zico Coronel	Unknown	4 March	Chanel Pompallier	N/A	
New Zealand Breakers	Assistant Coach	N/A			30 November	Jacob Mooallem	Indiana Hoosiers head video manager (2016–2020)	
Perth Wildcats	Assistant Coach	7 January	Scott Roth	New club	27 January	Bob Thornton	Sacramento Kings assistant coach (2016–2019)	
South East Melbourne Phoenix	Assistant Coach	21 March	Ian Stacker	Mutual agreement	N/A			
Sydney Kings	Head Coach	13 November	Will Weaver	Departing league	4 December	Adam Forde	Sydney Kings assistant coach (2019–2020)	
Sydney Kings	Assistant Coach	4 December	Adam Forde	Promotion	22 December	Sam Gruggen	N/A	
Sydney Kings	Assistant Coach	N/A			22 December	Kevin Lisch	N/A	
Sydney Kings	Assistant Coach	N/A			22 December	Lachlan Lonergan	N/A	

== Player movements ==
=== Retained players/Contract extensions ===
Date signed	Player	Team	Contract length	Ref
18 December	Corey Webster	New Zealand Breakers	Two seasons	
16 February	Finn Delany	New Zealand Breakers	Two seasons	
16 February	Robert Loe	New Zealand Breakers	Three seasons	
19 February	Will Magnay	Brisbane Bullets	Two seasons	
5 March	Jarrad Weeks	New Zealand Breakers	One season	
6 May	Daniel Johnson	Adelaide 36ers	Three seasons	
20 May	Matt Hodgson	Brisbane Bullets	One season	
26 May	Bryce Cotton (IP)	Perth Wildcats	Three seasons	
3 June	Craig Moller (PO)	Sydney Kings	One season	
3 June	Majok Majok (PO)	Perth Wildcats	One season	
15 June	Shaun Bruce	Sydney Kings	Two seasons	
18 June	Kendall Stephens	South East Melbourne Phoenix	One season, with one season option	
7 July	Mirko Djeric (TO)	Cairns Taipans	One season	
7 July	Fabijan Krslovic (TO)	Cairns Taipans	One season	
7 July	Kouat Noi (MO)	Cairns Taipans	One season	
7 July	Xavier Cooks	Sydney Kings	One season	
17 July	Chris Goulding	Melbourne United	Three seasons	
22 July	David Barlow	Melbourne United	One season	
3 August	Nathan Jawai	Cairns Taipans	Two seasons	
6 August	Jarrod Kenny	Cairns Taipans	One season	
13 August	Taylor Britt (DP)	Perth Wildcats	One season	
14 August	Sam McDaniel	Melbourne United	One season	
27 August	Casper Ware (IP)	Sydney Kings	One season	
3 September	Daniel Kickert	Sydney Kings	One season	
3 September	George Blagojevic	Cairns Taipans	One season, with one season option	
13 October	Callum Dalton (DP)	Brisbane Bullets	One season	
13 November	Kian Dennis (DP)	Brisbane Bullets	Unknown	
16 November	Cameron Oliver (IP)	Cairns Taipans	Two seasons	
22 November	Scott Machado (IP)	Cairns Taipans	Two seasons	

=== Released players ===
Date released	Player	Team	Remaining contract length	Ref
15 April	Kevin White	Adelaide 36ers	N/A	
17 June	Cameron Gliddon	Brisbane Bullets	One season	
16 August	Yanni Wetzell	South East Melbourne Phoenix	One season (plus player option)	
20 August	Casey Prather	Melbourne United	One season	
29 September	Obi Kyei	Adelaide 36ers	One season	
24 November	Jae'Sean Tate	Sydney Kings	One season	
28 November	Will Magnay	Brisbane Bullets	Two seasons	
7 February	Donald Sloan	Adelaide 36ers	One season	
12 March	Jeremy Kendle	Adelaide 36ers	One season	
16 March	Lamar Patterson	New Zealand Breakers	One season	
17 March	Orlando Johnson	Brisbane Bullets	One season	
19 April	Didi Louzada	Sydney Kings	Two seasons	
1 May	Jarrad Weeks	New Zealand Breakers	One season	
3 May	Deng Adel	Illawarra Hawks	One season	

=== Free agency ===
Free agency negotiations were initially delayed until at least 1 May 2020, after the NBL and the Australian Basketball Players' Association postponed the original start date of 30 March 2020 due to the COVID-19 pandemic. On 1 May 2020 the start of free agency was further delayed to 1 July 2020, and on 26 June 2020 it was delayed again to 15 July 2020.

Date signed	Player	Team	Contract length	Ref
15 July	Tai Webster	New Zealand Breakers	One season	
15 July	Daniel Trist	New Zealand Breakers	One season	
15 July	Kyrin Galloway (DP)	New Zealand Breakers	Three seasons (first as development player)	
15 July	Anthony Drmic	Brisbane Bullets	Two seasons (plus option)	
15 July	Jack White	Melbourne United	Three seasons	
15 July	Emmett Naar	The Hawks	One season	
16 July	Cameron Gliddon	South East Melbourne Phoenix	Two seasons	
16 July	Isaac Humphries	Adelaide 36ers	Two seasons	
16 July	Tanner Krebs	Brisbane Bullets	Two seasons	
16 July	Deng Deng	The Hawks	One season	
17 July	Harry Froling	Brisbane Bullets	One season (plus option)	
17 July	Keanu Pinder	Adelaide 36ers	One season	
17 July	Dejan Vasiljevic	Sydney Kings	Three seasons	
19 July	Yudai Baba (SRP)	Melbourne United	One season	
20 July	Tamuri Wigness	Brisbane Bullets	Two seasons	
20 July	Angus Glover	Sydney Kings	Three seasons	
20 July	Todd Blanchfield	Perth Wildcats	Two seasons	
21 July	Daniel Grida	The Hawks	Two seasons	
22 July	Reuben Te Rangi	South East Melbourne Phoenix	Two seasons	
22 July	Sunday Dech	Adelaide 36ers	Three seasons	
22 July	Sam Froling	The Hawks	Two seasons	
23 July	Deng Adel	The Hawks	One season	
24 July	Mason Peatling (DP)	Melbourne United	Three seasons (first as development player)	
24 July	Isaac White	The Hawks	One season	
28 July	Yanni Wetzell	South East Melbourne Phoenix	One season (plus option)	
28 July	Tyler Harvey (IP)	The Hawks	One season	
4 August	Cameron Bairstow	The Hawks	One season	
4 August	Lamar Patterson (IP)	New Zealand Breakers	One season	
5 August	Max Darling	The Hawks	Three seasons	
6 August	Kevin White	Perth Wildcats	One season	
13 August	Taine Murray (DP)	New Zealand Breakers	One season	
15 August	Justin Simon (IP)	The Hawks	One season	
15 August	John Mooney (IP)	Perth Wildcats	One season	
15 August	Jordan Ngatai	Cairns Taipans	One season (plus option)	
20 August	Donald Sloan (IP)	Adelaide 36ers	One season	
24 August	Andrew Ferguson (DP)	Perth Wildcats	One season	
8 September	Andrew Ogilvy (IR)	The Hawks	One season	
15 September	Colton Iverson (IP)	New Zealand Breakers	One season	
24 September	Izayah Mauriohooho-Le'afa (DP)	South East Melbourne Phoenix	One season	
12 October	Akoldah Gak (DP)	The Hawks	Three seasons (first as development player)	
14 October	Yanni Wetzell	South East Melbourne Phoenix	One season (plus option)	
30 October	Blake Jones (DP)	Brisbane Bullets	One season	
9 November	Ben Moore (IP)	South East Melbourne Phoenix	One season	
16 November	Orlando Johnson (IP)	Brisbane Bullets	One season	
24 November	Corey Shervill (DP)	Perth Wildcats	One season	
30 November	Scotty Hopson (IP)	Melbourne United	One season	
1 December	Tony Crocker (IP)	Adelaide 36ers	One season	
1 December	Tristan Forsyth (DP)	South East Melbourne Phoenix	One season	
2 December	Jarell Martin (IP)	Sydney Kings	One season (plus option)	
4 December	Vic Law (IP)	Brisbane Bullets	One season	
8 December	Keifer Sykes (IP)	South East Melbourne Phoenix	One season	
9 December	Jarred Bairstow (IR)	Perth Wildcats	One season	
10 December	Jock Landale	Melbourne United	One season	
12 December	Isaac Davidson (DP)	New Zealand Breakers	Two seasons plus option	
18 December	Rasmus Bach	New Zealand Breakers	One season (plus option)	
22 December	Jordan Hunt (DP)	Cairns Taipans	One season	
2 January	Tom Vodanovich (IR)	Sydney Kings	One season	
7 January	Owen Hulland (DP)	Adelaide 36ers	One season	
12 January	Lachlan Dent (DP)	The Hawks	One season	
14 January	Tom Jervis	Perth Wildcats	One season	
14 January	Jaylin Galloway (DP)	Sydney Kings	One season	
14 January	Lochlan Hutchison (DP)	Sydney Kings	One season	
14 January	Archie Woodhill (DP)	Sydney Kings	One season	
15 January	Mike Karena (IR)	South East Melbourne Phoenix	One season	
5 February	Dexter Kernich-Drew (IR)	Sydney Kings	One season	
9 February	Dillon Stith (IR)	Melbourne United	One season	
10 February	Jeremy Kendle (IP)	Adelaide 36ers	One season	
15 February	Ryan Broekhoff	South East Melbourne Phoenix	One season	
18 February	Brandon Paul (IP)	Adelaide 36ers	One season	
2 March	Jack Purchase (IR)	Adelaide 36ers	One season	
13 March	Jeremy Kendle (IR)	New Zealand Breakers	One season	
13 March	William McDowell-White (IR)	New Zealand Breakers	One season	
13 March	C. J. Asuncion-Byrd (IR)	Melbourne United	One season	
16 March	Levi Randolph (IP)	New Zealand Breakers	One season (plus option)	
17 March	Lamar Patterson (IP)	Brisbane Bullets	One season	
17 March	Jamaal Robateau (IR)	Brisbane Bullets	One season	
2 April	Hyrum Harris (IR)	Cairns Taipans	One season	
19 April	B. J. Johnson (IP, IR)	Brisbane Bullets	One season	
20 April	Venky Jois	Cairns Taipans	One season	
5 May	Jarrad Weeks (IR)	Sydney Kings	One season	
6 May	Will Magnay (NR)	Perth Wildcats	One season	
8 May	David Andersen (IR)	Melbourne United	One season	
11 May	Tim Coenraad (IR)	Illawarra Hawks	One season	

=== Next Star signings ===
The NBL Next Stars Program is designed to provide young elite overseas players, mainly Americans, with a professional option immediately out of secondary school. Each team receives one additional import roster slot intended to provide a "Next Star" slot.

Date signed	Player	Team	Ref
12 March	Josh Giddey	Adelaide 36ers	
13 March	Mojave King	Cairns Taipans	
28 August	Justinian Jessup	The Hawks	

=== Departing the league ===
==== Players who opted out ====
On 18 April 2020, due to the COVID-19 pandemic the NBL signed an agreement with the Australian Basketball Players' Association which implemented salary cuts designed to protect the league during the pandemic. In this agreement, players were allowed to opt out of their current contracts across a two-week period following the agreement's implementation. However, players were able to opt back into their previous contracts or re-sign with their previous club but couldn't sign with a new NBL club until their contract expired.

Player	Date left	NBL team	NBL contract status	Date signed	New team	New league	Ref
Bryce Cotton	30 April 2020	Perth Wildcats	One season left (opted out)	26 May 2020	Perth Wildcats	NBL	
Xavier Cooks	2 May 2020	Sydney Kings	One season left (opted out)	7 July 2020	Sydney Kings	NBL	
Matt Hodgson	2 May 2020	Brisbane Bullets	One season left (opted out)	20 May 2020	Brisbane Bullets	NBL	
Nick Kay	4 May 2020	Perth Wildcats	One season left (opted out)	5 July 2020	Real Betis Baloncesto	Liga ACB	
Casper Ware	4 May 2020	Sydney Kings	One season option (opted out)	27 August 2020	Sydney Kings	NBL	

==== Other players who left the league ====
*	Denotes international players who returned to their home country

Player	NBL team	Date signed	New team	New league	Ref
Jerome Randle	Adelaide 36ers	3 March 2020	Baloncesto Fuenlabrada	Liga ACB	
Shawn Long	Melbourne United	16 June 2020	Ulsan Mobis Phoebus	KBL	
Melo Trimble	Melbourne United	22 June 2020	Baloncesto Fuenlabrada	Liga ACB	
Sek Henry	New Zealand Breakers	8 July 2020	Karşıyaka Basket	BSL	
Rhys Vague	Perth Wildcats	9 July 2020	Kagawa Five Arrows	B.League	
John Roberson	South East Melbourne Phoenix	14 July 2020	CB Estudiantes	Liga ACB	
Josh Boone	Illawarra Hawks	9 August 2020	Al Riffa	BPL	
Stanton Kidd	Melbourne United	18 August 2020	OGM Ormanspor	BSL	
Ater Majok	New Zealand Breakers	20 August 2020	Al-Arabi	QBL	
D. J. Newbill	Cairns Taipans	22 August 2020	Osaka Evessa	B.League	
Casey Prather	Melbourne United	23 August 2020	Hapoel Eliat	IBPL	
Eric Griffin	Adelaide 36ers	5 September 2020	Hapoel Eliat	IBPL	
Ben Ayre	Adelaide 36ers	6 September 2020	Mažeikiai	NKL	
Taine Murray	New Zealand Breakers	13 September 2020	Virginia Cavaliers	NCAA	
Darington Hobson	Illawarra Hawks	11 October 2020	Peñarol	LNB	
Brandon Ashley*	New Zealand Breakers	12 November 2020	NBA G League Ignite	NBA G League	
LaMelo Ball*	Illawarra Hawks	18 November 2020	Charlotte Hornets	NBA	
Jae'Sean Tate*	Sydney Kings	26 November 2020	Houston Rockets	NBA	
R. J. Hampton*	New Zealand Breakers	1 December 2020	Denver Nuggets	NBA	
Will Magnay	Brisbane Bullets	2 December 2020	New Orleans Pelicans	NBA	
Alex Pledger*	Melbourne United	23 December 2020	Southland Sharks	NZNBL	
Terrico White	Perth Wildcats	9 January 2021	Cariduros de Fajardo	BSN	
Deshon Taylor	Sydney Kings	12 January 2021	Canterbury Rams	NZNBL	
E. J. Singler	Brisbane Bullets	19 January 2021	Canterbury Rams	NZNBL	
Tohi Smith-Milner*	Melbourne United	1 February 2021	Wellington Saints	NZNBL	
Taylor Braun	Brisbane Bullets	20 February 2021	Hapoel Be'er Sheva	IBPL	
Didi Louzada	Sydney Kings	27 April 2021	New Orleans Pelicans	NBA	
Cameron Oliver*	Cairns Taipans	10 May 2021	Houston Rockets	NBA	

== Rosters ==
Note: Flags indicate national team eligibility at FIBA-sanctioned events. Players may hold other non-FIBA nationalities not displayed.

=== Adelaide 36ers ===
2020–21 Adelaide 36ers roster
Players
Coaches

Pos.	No.	Nat.	Name	Ht.	Wt.	Age
G/F	2	(United States)	Crocker, Tony (I)	1.98 m (6 ft 6 in)	98 kg (216 lb)	39 – 17 January 1987
G	3	(United States)	Paul, Brandon (I)	1.93 m (6 ft 4 in)	91 kg (201 lb)	34 – 30 April 1991
G	6	(Australia)	Giddey, Josh (NS & IN)	2.00 m (6 ft 7 in)	87 kg (192 lb)	23 – 10 October 2002
G	7	(Australia)	Teys, Brendan (C)	1.92 m (6 ft 4 in)	82 kg (181 lb)	35 – 22 February 1990
C	8	(Australia)	Humphries, Isaac	2.11 m (6 ft 11 in)	116 kg (256 lb)	28 – 5 January 1998
G	9	(Australia)	McVeigh, Jack	2.03 m (6 ft 8 in)	95 kg (209 lb)	29 – 27 June 1996
G	10	(Australia)	Mudronja, Alex	1.96 m (6 ft 5 in)	88 kg (194 lb)	26 – 3 September 1999
F	11	(Australia)	Purchase, Jack	2.06 m (6 ft 9 in)	95 kg (209 lb)	30 – 26 June 1995
G	12	(Australia)	Dillon, Daniel (C)	1.93 m (6 ft 4 in)	91 kg (201 lb)	39 – 19 March 1986
C	21	(Australia)	Johnson, Daniel (C)	2.12 m (6 ft 11 in)	108 kg (238 lb)	37 – 3 April 1988
F	25	(Australia)	Pinder, Keanu	2.05 m (6 ft 9 in)	100 kg (220 lb)	30 – 28 May 1995
F	32	(Australia)	Hulland, Owen (DP)	2.12 m (6 ft 11 in)	108 kg (238 lb)	26 – 4 October 1999
G	44	(South Sudan)	Dech, Sunday	1.95 m (6 ft 5 in)	93 kg (205 lb)	32 – 1 January 1994

Head coach

- (United States) Conner Henry

Assistant coach(es)

- (Australia) Jamie Pearlman

Legend

- (C) Team captain
- (DP) Development player
- (IN) Inactive
- (I) Import player
- (TP) Training player
- (NS) Next Star player
- Injured

- Roster
Updated: 18 May 2021

=== Brisbane Bullets ===
2020–21 Brisbane Bullets roster
Players
Coaches

Pos.	No.	Nat.	Name	Ht.	Wt.	Age
G	0	(Australia)	Wigness, Tamuri	1.80 m (5 ft 11 in)	84 kg (185 lb)	23 – 26 March 2002
G	1	(Australia)	Jones, Blake (DP)	2.04 m (6 ft 8 in)	86 kg (190 lb)	23 – 28 February 2002
F	2	(Australia)	Dennis, Kian (DP)	1.97 m (6 ft 6 in)	83 kg (183 lb)	24 – 9 April 2001
G/F	3	(Australia)	Drmic, Anthony	1.98 m (6 ft 6 in)	93 kg (205 lb)	33 – 25 February 1992
F	4	(United States)	Law, Vic (injured) (IN)	2.01 m (6 ft 7 in)	91 kg (201 lb)	30 – 19 December 1995
G	5	(Australia)	Cadee, Jason (C)	1.86 m (6 ft 1 in)	80 kg (176 lb)	34 – 15 April 1991
C	6	(Australia)	Hodgson, Matt	2.11 m (6 ft 11 in)	115 kg (254 lb)	34 – 2 August 1991
F/C	9	(Australia)	Dalton, Callum (DP)	2.07 m (6 ft 9 in)	109 kg (240 lb)	25 – 4 May 2000
C	11	(Australia)	Froling, Harry	2.11 m (6 ft 11 in)	120 kg (265 lb)	27 – 20 April 1998
F	12	(United States)	Johnson, B. J. (I)	2.01 m (6 ft 7 in)	97 kg (214 lb)	30 – 21 December 1995
G/F	13	(United States)	Patterson, Lamar (I)	1.96 m (6 ft 5 in)	100 kg (220 lb)	34 – 12 August 1991
G	17	(Australia)	Krebs, Tanner	1.98 m (6 ft 6 in)	91 kg (201 lb)	30 – 4 January 1996
G	18	(Australia)	Robateau, Jamaal	1.96 m (6 ft 5 in)	82 kg (181 lb)	31 – 18 May 1994
G	20	(Australia)	Sobey, Nathan	1.88 m (6 ft 2 in)	86 kg (190 lb)	35 – 14 July 1990
C	24	(New Zealand)	Harrison, Tyrell	2.14 m (7 ft 0 in)	95 kg (209 lb)	26 – 6 July 1999

Head coach

- (Australia) Andrej Lemanis

Assistant coach(es)

- (Australia) C. J. Bruton
- (Australia) Greg Vanderjagt

Legend

- (C) Team captain
- (DP) Development player
- (IN) Inactive
- (I) Import player
- (TP) Training player
- (NS) Next Star player
- Injured

- Roster
Updated: 19 April 2021

=== Cairns Taipans ===
2020–21 Cairns Taipans roster
Players
Coaches

Pos.	No.	Nat.	Name	Ht.	Wt.	Age
F	0	(United States)	Oliver, Cameron (I, IN)	2.03 m (6 ft 8 in)	102 kg (225 lb)	29 – 11 July 1996
G	1	(New Zealand)	King, Mojave (injured) (NS)	1.95 m (6 ft 5 in)	88 kg (194 lb)	23 – 11 June 2002
G	3	(Brazil)	Machado, Scott (I & C)	1.85 m (6 ft 1 in)	82 kg (181 lb)	35 – 8 June 1990
G	4	(Australia)	Dufelmeier, Tad	1.83 m (6 ft 0 in)	79 kg (174 lb)	29 – 9 February 1996
G	5	(Australia)	Đerić, Mirko	1.88 m (6 ft 2 in)	82 kg (181 lb)	30 – 17 April 1995
G	6	(New Zealand)	Kenny, Jarrod	1.88 m (6 ft 2 in)	87 kg (192 lb)	40 – 17 September 1985
F	9	(Australia)	Blagojevic, George	2.03 m (6 ft 8 in)	100 kg (220 lb)	29 – 18 October 1996
C	10	(New Zealand)	Hunt, Jordan (DP)	2.06 m (6 ft 9 in)	108 kg (238 lb)	28 – 12 September 1997
F	11	(New Zealand)	Ngatai, Jordan	1.96 m (6 ft 5 in)	98 kg (216 lb)	32 – 7 March 1993
F	12	(Australia)	Noi, Kouat (injured)	2.01 m (6 ft 7 in)	93 kg (205 lb)	28 – 29 October 1997
F	13	(South Sudan)	Deng, Majok	2.08 m (6 ft 10 in)	84 kg (185 lb)	32 – 1 March 1993
C	15	(Australia)	Jawai, Nathan	2.09 m (6 ft 10 in)	140 kg (309 lb)	39 – 10 October 1986
F	20	(Australia)	Krslovic, Fabijan (injured)	2.03 m (6 ft 8 in)	108 kg (238 lb)	30 – 23 June 1995
F	55	(Australia)	Jois, Venky (IN)	2.03 m (6 ft 8 in)	104 kg (229 lb)	32 – 7 July 1993

Head coach

- (United States) Mike Kelly

Assistant coach(es)

- (Australia) Jamie O'Loughlin
- (Australia) Brad Hill
- (Australia) Lennon Smartt

Team manager

- (Australia) Brett Havercroft

Legend

- (C) Team captain
- (DP) Development player
- (IN) Inactive
- (I) Import player
- (TP) Training player
- (NS) Next Star player
- Injured

- Roster
Updated: 4 May 2021

=== Illawarra Hawks ===
2020–21 Illawarra Hawks roster
Players
Coaches

Pos.	No.	Nat.	Name	Ht.	Wt.	Age
G	0	(United States)	Simon, Justin (I)	1.96 m (6 ft 5 in)	98 kg (216 lb)	29 – 6 May 1996
G	1	(United States)	Harvey, Tyler (I)	1.93 m (6 ft 4 in)	84 kg (185 lb)	32 – 17 July 1993
G	2	(Australia)	White, Isaac	1.88 m (6 ft 2 in)	82 kg (181 lb)	27 – 22 June 1998
G	3	(Australia)	Naar, Emmett	1.85 m (6 ft 1 in)	88 kg (194 lb)	31 – 3 July 1994
C	6	(Australia)	Ogilvy, Andrew (C)	2.11 m (6 ft 11 in)	115 kg (254 lb)	37 – 17 June 1988
F	7	(Australia)	Deng, Deng	2.03 m (6 ft 8 in)	93 kg (205 lb)	34 – 5 January 1992
F/C	8	(New Zealand)	Darling, Max	1.99 m (6 ft 6 in)	100 kg (220 lb)	25 – 30 September 2000
G	10	(United States)	Jessup, Justinian (NS)	2.01 m (6 ft 7 in)	92 kg (203 lb)	27 – 23 May 1998
G/F	11	(Australia)	Grida, Daniel	1.97 m (6 ft 6 in)	93 kg (205 lb)	27 – 26 April 1998
F/C	13	(Australia)	Froling, Sam	2.13 m (7 ft 0 in)	109 kg (240 lb)	25 – 10 February 2000
G	17	(Australia)	Dent, Lachlan (DP)	1.83 m (6 ft 0 in)		25 – 1 February 2000
F/C	41	(Australia)	Bairstow, Cameron	2.06 m (6 ft 9 in)	113 kg (249 lb)	35 – 7 December 1990
F	47	(Australia)	Gak, Akoldah (DP)	2.11 m (6 ft 11 in)	91 kg (201 lb)	23 – 12 July 2002
F	79	(Australia)	Coenraad, Tim	1.99 m (6 ft 6 in)	97 kg (214 lb)	40 – 5 June 1985

Head coach

- (United States) Brian Goorjian

Assistant coach(es)

- (Australia) Jacob Jackomas
- (Australia) Shaun Roger

Legend

- (C) Team captain
- (DP) Development player
- (IN) Inactive
- (I) Import player
- (TP) Training player
- (NS) Next Star player
- Injured

- Roster
Updated: 16 May 2021

=== Melbourne United ===
2020–21 Melbourne United roster
Players
Coaches

Pos.	No.	Nat.	Name	Ht.	Wt.	Age
C	0	(South Sudan)	Lual-Acuil, Jo	2.13 m (7 ft 0 in)	102 kg (225 lb)	31 – 26 April 1994
G	5	(Australia)	Short, Sam (DP)	1.95 m (6 ft 5 in)	78 kg (172 lb)	27 – 11 February 1998
G	10	(Australia)	McCarron, Mitch (C)	1.89 m (6 ft 2 in)	97 kg (214 lb)	33 – 30 June 1992
F/C	13	(Australia)	Andersen, David	2.11 m (6 ft 11 in)	113 kg (249 lb)	45 – 23 June 1980
F	14	(Australia)	White, Jack (injured)	2.01 m (6 ft 7 in)	101 kg (223 lb)	28 – 5 August 1997
G	18	(Japan)	Baba, Yudai (SRP)	1.96 m (6 ft 5 in)	90 kg (198 lb)	30 – 7 November 1995
F	20	(Australia)	Barlow, David	2.05 m (6 ft 9 in)	97 kg (214 lb)	42 – 22 October 1983
F	22	(Australia)	Peatling, Mason (DP)	2.03 m (6 ft 8 in)	100 kg (220 lb)	28 – 31 March 1997
G	30	(Australia)	McDaniel, Sam	1.98 m (6 ft 6 in)	95 kg (209 lb)	30 – 9 December 1995
F	32	(United States)	Hopson, Scotty (I)	2.01 m (6 ft 7 in)	104 kg (229 lb)	36 – 8 August 1989
F	34	(Australia)	Landale, Jock	2.11 m (6 ft 11 in)	116 kg (256 lb)	30 – 25 October 1995
G	43	(Australia)	Goulding, Chris (C)	1.92 m (6 ft 4 in)	92 kg (203 lb)	37 – 24 October 1988
G	51	(New Zealand)	Ili, Shea	1.83 m (6 ft 0 in)	85 kg (187 lb)	33 – 6 October 1992

Head coach

- (Australia) Dean Vickerman

Assistant coach(es)

- (Australia) Rhys Carter
- (Australia) Darryl McDonald
- (Australia) Justin Schueller

Strength & conditioning coach(es)

- (Australia) Nik Popovic

Team manager

- (Australia) Stephan Semerci

Legend

- (C) Team captain
- (DP) Development player
- (IN) Inactive
- (I) Import player
- (SRP) Special restricted player
- (NS) Next Star player
- Injured

- Roster
Updated: 8 May 2021

=== New Zealand Breakers ===
2020–21 New Zealand Breakers roster
Players
Coaches

Pos.	No.	Nat.	Name	Ht.	Wt.	Age
G	0	(New Zealand)	Webster, Tai	1.93 m (6 ft 4 in)	89 kg (196 lb)	30 – 29 May 1995
G	1	(New Zealand)	Murray, Taine (DP)	1.96 m (6 ft 5 in)	89 kg (196 lb)	23 – 19 April 2002
F	3	(New Zealand)	Delany, Finn	1.98 m (6 ft 6 in)	102 kg (225 lb)	30 – 12 August 1995
C	4	(United States)	Iverson, Colton (I)	2.13 m (7 ft 0 in)	116 kg (256 lb)	36 – 29 June 1989
F	6	(Australia)	Galloway, Kyrin (DP)	2.03 m (6 ft 8 in)	97 kg (214 lb)	26 – 7 October 1999
G	7	(Australia)	McDowell-White, Will	1.96 m (6 ft 5 in)	84 kg (185 lb)	27 – 13 April 1998
G	9	(New Zealand)	Webster, Corey	1.88 m (6 ft 2 in)	86 kg (190 lb)	37 – 29 November 1988
G/F	10	(New Zealand)	Abercrombie, Thomas (C)	1.98 m (6 ft 6 in)	90 kg (198 lb)	38 – 5 July 1987
F	12	(New Zealand)	Davidson, Isaac (DP)	2.01 m (6 ft 7 in)	100 kg (220 lb)	28 – 22 June 1997
F/C	15	(New Zealand)	Loe, Robert	2.11 m (6 ft 11 in)	111 kg (245 lb)	34 – 5 August 1991
G	18	(Denmark)	Bach, Rasmus	1.93 m (6 ft 4 in)	84 kg (185 lb)	30 – 22 July 1995
G/F	20	(United States)	Randolph, Levi (I)	1.98 m (6 ft 6 in)	95 kg (209 lb)	33 – 3 October 1992
F	25	(Australia)	Trist, Daniel	2.06 m (6 ft 9 in)	104 kg (229 lb)	33 – 29 August 1992

Head coach

- (Israel) Dan Shamir

Assistant coach(es)

- (Israel) Mody Maor
- (New Zealand) Chanel Pompallier
- (United States) Rashid Al-Kaleem

Strength & conditioning coach(es)

- (New Zealand) Emily Nolan

Legend

- (C) Team captain
- (DP) Development player
- (IN) Inactive
- (I) Import player
- (TP) Training player
- (NS) Next Star player
- Injured

- Roster
Updated: 1 May 2021

=== Perth Wildcats ===
2020–21 Perth Wildcats roster
Players
Coaches

Pos.	No.	Nat.	Name	Ht.	Wt.	Age
F	2	(Australia)	Bairstow, Jarred	2.01 m (6 ft 7 in)	104 kg (229 lb)	33 – 5 November 1992
G	3	(Australia)	White, Kevin	1.87 m (6 ft 2 in)	94 kg (207 lb)	38 – 7 April 1987
G	4	(Australia)	Travers, Luke (DP)	2.01 m (6 ft 7 in)	93 kg (205 lb)	24 – 3 September 2001
G	5	(Australia)	Britt, Taylor (DP)	1.88 m (6 ft 2 in)	79 kg (174 lb)	29 – 22 September 1996
G	8	(Australia)	Norton, Mitch	1.86 m (6 ft 1 in)	91 kg (201 lb)	32 – 1 April 1993
G/F	9	(Australia)	Swaka Lo Buluk, Wani	1.94 m (6 ft 4 in)	87 kg (192 lb)	24 – 9 June 2001
G	11	(United States)	Cotton, Bryce (injured) (I)	1.82 m (6 ft 0 in)	75 kg (165 lb)	33 – 11 August 1992
G/F	12	(Australia)	Blanchfield, Todd	2.00 m (6 ft 7 in)	95 kg (209 lb)	34 – 7 November 1991
C	13	(Australia)	Jervis, Tom	2.11 m (6 ft 11 in)	105 kg (231 lb)	38 – 4 February 1987
F/C	22	(South Sudan)	Majok, Majok (injured)	2.06 m (6 ft 9 in)	111 kg (245 lb)	33 – 10 December 1992
C	23	(Australia)	Magnay, Will	2.08 m (6 ft 10 in)	106 kg (234 lb)	27 – 2 June 1998
F	24	(Australia)	Wagstaff, Jesse (C)	2.03 m (6 ft 8 in)	103 kg (227 lb)	39 – 30 April 1986
F	25	(Australia)	Shervill, Corey (DP)	2.01 m (6 ft 7 in)	100 kg (220 lb)	27 – 19 March 1998
F	33	(United States)	Mooney, John (I)	2.06 m (6 ft 9 in)	111 kg (245 lb)	27 – 20 March 1998
C	34	(Australia)	Ferguson, Andrew (DP)	2.13 m (7 ft 0 in)	104 kg (229 lb)	27 – 17 October 1998
G/F	35	(Australia)	Steindl, Clint	2.00 m (6 ft 7 in)	91 kg (201 lb)	36 – 15 March 1989

Head coach

- (Australia) Trevor Gleeson

Assistant coach(es)

- (United States) Bob Thornton
- (Australia) Jacob Chance
- (Australia) Luke Brennan

Strength & conditioning coach(es)

- (Australia) Josh Cavanagh

Legend

- (C) Team captain
- (DP) Development player
- (IN) Inactive
- (I) Import player
- (TP) Training player
- (NS) Next Star player
- Injured

- Roster
Updated: 6 May 2021

=== South East Melbourne Phoenix ===
2020–21 South East Melbourne Phoenix roster
Players
Coaches

Pos.	No.	Nat.	Name	Ht.	Wt.	Age
G	1	(Australia)	Gibson, Adam (C)	1.88 m (6 ft 2 in)	93 kg (205 lb)	39 – 30 October 1986
G	3	(Australia)	Gliddon, Cameron	1.97 m (6 ft 6 in)	94 kg (207 lb)	36 – 16 August 1989
G	4	(Australia)	Adnam, Kyle (C)	1.86 m (6 ft 1 in)	83 kg (183 lb)	32 – 18 November 1993
G/F	7	(New Zealand)	Te Rangi, Reuben	1.98 m (6 ft 6 in)	105 kg (231 lb)	31 – 14 October 1994
G	8	(New Zealand)	Le'afa, Izayah (DP)	1.88 m (6 ft 2 in)	90 kg (198 lb)	29 – 7 November 1996
F	10	(New Zealand)	Wetzell, Yanni	2.08 m (6 ft 10 in)	109 kg (240 lb)	29 – 8 July 1996
G	21	(Australia)	Stephens, Kendall (injured)	2.01 m (6 ft 7 in)	93 kg (205 lb)	31 – 11 November 1994
C	22	(Australia)	Pineau, Dane (injured)	2.06 m (6 ft 9 in)	102 kg (225 lb)	31 – 2 August 1994
F/C	26	(United States)	Moore, Ben (I)	2.03 m (6 ft 8 in)	100 kg (220 lb)	30 – 13 May 1995
G	28	(United States)	Sykes, Keifer (I)	1.80 m (5 ft 11 in)	80 kg (176 lb)	32 – 30 December 1993
F/C	30	(Australia)	Forsyth, Tristan (DP)	2.08 m (6 ft 10 in)	107 kg (236 lb)	28 – 19 January 1998
G/F	45	(Australia)	Broekhoff, Ryan (injured)	1.98 m (6 ft 6 in)	98 kg (216 lb)	35 – 23 August 1990
C	50	(New Zealand)	Karena, Mike	2.08 m (6 ft 10 in)	122 kg (269 lb)	32 – 24 October 1993
G/F	55	(Australia)	Creek, Mitch	1.96 m (6 ft 5 in)	98 kg (216 lb)	33 – 27 April 1992

Head coach

- (Australia) Simon Mitchell

Assistant coach(es)

- (New Zealand) Judd Flavell
- (Australia) Luke Kendall

Legend

- (C) Team captain
- (DP) Development player
- (IN) Inactive
- (I) Import player
- (TP) Training player
- (NS) Next Star player
- Injured

- Roster
Updated: 12 March 2021

=== Sydney Kings ===
2020–21 Sydney Kings roster
Players
Coaches

Pos.	No.	Nat.	Name	Ht.	Wt.	Age
C	1	(Australia)	Hunter, Jordan	2.08 m (6 ft 10 in)	104 kg (229 lb)	28 – 20 August 1997
G	2	(Australia)	Hutchison, Lochlan (DP)	1.88 m (6 ft 2 in)	85 kg (187 lb)	26 – 29 October 1999
G	3	(Australia)	Vasiljevic, Dejan (injured)	1.91 m (6 ft 3 in)	86 kg (190 lb)	28 – 26 April 1997
G	5	(Australia)	Glover, Angus (injured)	1.93 m (6 ft 4 in)	87 kg (192 lb)	27 – 8 September 1998
G	7	(Australia)	Bruce, Shaun	1.90 m (6 ft 3 in)	82 kg (181 lb)	35 – 13 January 1991
G/F	8	(Australia)	Newley, Brad	1.98 m (6 ft 6 in)	94 kg (207 lb)	40 – 18 February 1985
F	9	(Australia)	Moller, Craig	2.03 m (6 ft 8 in)	93 kg (205 lb)	31 – 22 August 1994
F	10	(Australia)	Cooks, Xavier	2.03 m (6 ft 8 in)	84 kg (185 lb)	30 – 19 September 1995
F	12	(United States)	Martin, Jarell (I)	2.08 m (6 ft 10 in)	108 kg (238 lb)	31 – 24 May 1994
F	13	(New Zealand)	Vodanovich, Tom	2.01 m (6 ft 7 in)	104 kg (229 lb)	31 – 28 July 1994
F/C	14	(Australia)	Kickert, Daniel (C)	2.08 m (6 ft 10 in)	109 kg (240 lb)	42 – 29 May 1983
F/C	15	(Australia)	Woodhill, Archie (DP)	2.06 m (6 ft 9 in)	95 kg (209 lb)	24 – 15 November 2001
G	22	(United States)	Ware, Casper (I & C)	1.78 m (5 ft 10 in)	79 kg (174 lb)	36 – 17 January 1990
F	25	(Australia)	Galloway, Yalin (DP)	2.01 m (6 ft 7 in)	82 kg (181 lb)	23 – 21 December 2002
G	30	(Australia)	Kernich-Drew, Dexter	1.99 m (6 ft 6 in)	83 kg (183 lb)	34 – 16 October 1991
G	97	(Australia)	Weeks, Jarrad	1.83 m (6 ft 0 in)	80 kg (176 lb)	36 – 11 July 1989

Head coach

- (Australia) Adam Forde

Assistant coach(es)

- (Canada) James Duncan
- (Australia) Sam Gruggen
- (United States) Kevin Lisch
- (Australia) Lachlan Lonergan

Legend

- (C) Team captain
- (DP) Development player
- (IN) Inactive
- (I) Import player
- (TP) Training player
- (NS) Next Star player
- Injured

- Roster
Updated: 5 May 2021

== See also ==
- 2020–21 NBL season
- National Basketball League (Australia)
