= Dallas Loughridge =

Australian basketball player (born 2004)

No. 4 – Michigan Wolverines
- Position: Guard
- Conference: Big Ten

Personal information
- Born: 23 January 2004 (age 22) Bena, Victoria, Australia
- Listed height: 5 ft 6 in (1.68 m)

Career information
- College: Michigan (2026–present)
- Playing career: 2022–present

Career history
- 2022–2024: Southside Flyers
- 2022–2024: Dandenong Rangers
- 2025–2026: Adelaide Lightning
- 2026: Casey Cavaiers

Career highlights
- NBL1 South Most Valuable Player (2026); All-NBL1 South First Team (2026); NBL1 South scoring champion (2026); WNBL Breakout Player of the Year Award (2026); NBL1 South Youth Player of the Year (2025)
Medals
Women's basketball
Representing Australia
FIBA Under-19 World Cup
Silver medal – second place	2021 Hungary	Team
Under-18 Asian Championship
Gold medal – first place	2022 India	Team

Dallas Loughridge (born 23 January 2004) is an Australian college basketball player for Michigan Wolverines of the Big Ten Conference. She previously played for the Casey Cavaliers, Southside Flyers and Adelaide Lightning of the Women's National Basketball League (WNBL). She helped the Australian national team win a silver medal at the 2021 FIBA Under-19 World Cup and a gold medal at the 2022 FIBA Under-18 Asian Championship.

== Playing career ==
On 8 September 2022, Loughridge signed with the Southside Flyers of the WNBL for the 2022–23 season. She suffered an ACL injury during the final pre-season game and missed the season. On 3 September 2024, she signed an extension with the Flyers. During the 2024–25 season, she averaged 11.4 points, 2.1 assists and 1.5 rebounds per game for the Flyers.

On 3 January 2024, she joined the Dandenong Rangers of the NBL1 South for the 2024 season. During the 2025 season, she averaged 20.3 points, 4.8 assists and 3.3 rebounds per game for the Rangers and was named the NBL1 South Youth Player of the Year.

On 16 June 2025, she signed with the Adelaide Lightning of the WNBL for the 2025–26 season. She averaged 16.35 points and 3.96 assists per game, finishing 7th in scoring and 10th in assists league wide. She was subsequently named the WNBL Breakout Player of the Year Award.

On 8 February 2026, she joined the Casey Cavaliers for the 2026 season. Through 17 games this season, she averaged 25.5 points, 5.1 assists, and 3.7 rebounds per game. On 20 June 2026, against Diamond Valley, she recorded for 38 points, six rebounds, six assists and four steals and was named the NBL1 South Foot Locker Player of the Week for Round 11. She was named NBL1 South Most Valuable Player and All-NBL1 South First Team for the 2026 season. She was also the league's leading scorer with 25.84 points per game.

On 25 June 2026, she committed to play college basketball at Michigan during the 2026–27 season.

== National team career ==
Poughridge represented Australia at the 2021 FIBA Under-19 Women's Basketball World Cup where she averaged six points, 1.9 rebounds, and 1.3 assists per game, and won a silver medal. She then competed at the 2022 FIBA Under-18 Women's Asian Championship where she averaged 13.8 points, 4.8 assists and 1.4 rebounds per game, and helped Australia win their first FIBA Under-18 Women's Asia Cup championship.

== Personal life ==
Loughridge is of Yorta Yorta heritage stemming from her maternal great grandmother Patricia "Ninny" Murray.
