= Berwick College =

Location
- Berwick, Victoria; Southern Metropolitan
- Coordinates: 38°1′57″S 145°21′51″E

Information
- Motto: Latin: Crescam (I shall grow)
- Opened: 1977
- Principal: Josie Millard
- Years offered: 7–12
- Enrollment: approx. 2300
- Education system: VELS, VCAL, VET and VCE
- Website: www.berwickcollege.vic.edu.au

Berwick College is a co-educational, public school for years 7 to 12 situated in the outer Melbourne metropolitan suburb of Berwick. It was once the largest single campus government secondary college in Victoria.

In 2006 the school started downsizing with the majority of a block of portables removed. The school consists of approximately 1500 students and 200 teachers, principals and aides.

At the state election in 2006, the Victorian Labor Party canvassed plans to build a junior campus of Berwick Secondary in the Timbarra Estate. This school would serve students in years seven to nine. The campus had been proposed, at past state elections, to act as a stand-alone campus. These ideas, however, were later rejected by the Government due to feasibility concerns.

Berwick College has been subject to an act of student violence on school grounds. On 21 August 2019, police were called to Berwick Secondary College about 1.30pm after reports that about 15 to 20 students were involved in a fight resulting in the arrest of three students aged between 14 and 16.

== Notable alumni ==
- Buddy Murphy (2006), professional wrestler
- Jaz Shelley (2019), basketball player
- Tom Scully, AFL player

== Basketball Team Achievements ==
=== Championship Men (Open) ===
- Australian Schools Championships

(gold) Champions: 2024
