= NBL1 South Awards =

The NBL1 South presents eight annual awards to recognise its teams, players, and coaches for their accomplishments. Each award has a male and female awardee.

== Individual awards ==
=== Most Valuable Player ===
Season	Men's			Women's		
Season	Player	Nationality	Team	Player	Nationality	Team
2019	Demarcus Gatlin	United States	Geelong Supercats	Kelly Wilson	Australia	Bendigo Braves
2020	Season cancelled					
2021	Season cancelled					
2022	Shea Ili	New Zealand	Sandringham Sabres	Alicia Froling	Australia	Knox Raiders
2023	Jack Purchase	Australia	Melbourne Tigers	Megan McKay	Australia	Bendigo Braves
2023	Daniel Trist	Australia	Frankston Blues	Megan McKay	Australia	Bendigo Braves
2024	Nick Marshall	Australia	Mount Gambier Pioneers	Isabelle Bourne	Australia	Keilor Thunder
2025	Tom Wilson	Australia	Melbourne Tigers	Jaz Shelley	Australia	Geelong United
2026	Jacob Richards	Australia	Hobart Chargers	Dallas Loughridge	Australia	Casey Cavaliers

=== Grand Final MVP ===
Season	Men's			Women's		
Season	Player	Nationality	Team	Player	Nationality	Team
2019	Dain Swetalla	United States	Nunawading Spectres	Lauren Nicholson	Australia	Kilsyth Cobras
2020	Season cancelled					
2021	Season cancelled					
2022	Sam McDaniel	Australia	Hobart Chargers	Marena Whittle	Australia	Ringwood Hawks
2023	Bailey Nunn	Australia	Knox Raiders	Amy Atwell	Australia	Bendigo Braves
2024	Angus Glover	Australia	Eltham Wildcats	Carley Ernst	Australia	Waverley Falcons
2025	Tom Koppens	Australia	Sandringham Sabres	Paige Bradley	Australia	Knox Raiders
2026	Jeremy Combs	United States	Frankston Blues	Paige Bradley	Australia	Knox Raiders

=== Defensive Player of the Year ===
Season	Men's			Women's		
Season	Player	Nationality	Team	Player	Nationality	Team
2019	Dane Pineau	Australia	Melbourne Tigers	Lauren Nicholson	Australia	Kilsyth Cobras
2020	Season cancelled					
2021	Season cancelled					
2022	Shea Ili	New Zealand	Sandringham Sabres	Digna Strautmane	Latvia	Ringwood Hawks
2023	Sam McDaniel	Australia	Hobart Chargers	Isabella Brancatisano	Australia	Mount Gambier Pioneers
2024	Demarcus Gatlin	United States	Geelong United	Abigail Wehrung	Australia	Ballarat Miners
2025	Sunday Dech	South Sudan	Knox Raiders	Stephanie Reid	Australia	Diamond Valley Eagles
2025	Sunday Dech	South Sudan	Knox Raiders	Gemma Potter	Australia	Geelong United
2026	Demarcus Gatlin	United States	Geelong United	Rebecca Pizzey	New Zealand	Eltham Wildcats

=== Youth Player of the Year ===
Season	Men's			Women's		
Season	Player	Nationality	Team	Player	Nationality	Team
2019	Alex Ducas	Australia	BA Centre of Excellence	Anneli Maley	Australia	Diamond Valley Eagles
2020	Season cancelled					
2021	Season cancelled					
2022	Owen Foxwell	Australia	Eltham Wildcats	Jade Melbourne	Australia	Ballarat Miners
2023	Luke Rosendale	Australia	Bendigo Braves	Nyadiew Puoch	Australia	Dandenong Rangers
2024	Austin Rapp	Australia	Knox Raiders	Shaneice Swain	Australia	Geelong United
2025	Christian D'Angelo	Australia	Nunawading Spectres	Dallas Loughridge	Australia	Dandenong Rangers
2026	Logan Gibson	Australia	Northern Force	Madison Ryan	Australia	Sandringham Sabres

=== Coach of the Year ===
Season	Men's			Women's		
Season	Coach	Nationality	Team	Coach	Nationality	Team
2019	Andrew Harms	Australia	Frankston Blues	Tim Mottin	Australia	Ringwood Hawks
2020	Season cancelled					
2021	Season cancelled					
2022	Peter Godfrey	Australia	Kilsyth Cobras	Matt Sutton	Australia	Mount Gambier Pioneers
2023	Matt Nunn	Australia	Knox Raiders	Mark Alabakov	Australia	Bendigo Braves
2024	Richard Hill	Australia	Mount Gambier Pioneers	Kristi Harrower	Australia	Keilor Thunder
2025	Richard Hill	Australia	Mount Gambier Pioneers	Megan Moody	Australia	Geelong United
2026	Andrew Cutler	Australia	Nunawading Spectres	Matt Bongetti	Australia	Eltham Wildcats

=== Referee of the Year ===
Season	Men's	Women's
2019	Andrew Hollowood	Tayla Flint
2020	Season cancelled	
2021	Season cancelled	
2022	Daniel Battye	Bianca Vernon

Season	Men's Division	Women's Division
2023	Brad Henshaw	Andrew Johnson
2024	Elliot Green	Chloe Erskine
2025	Joshua Durand	
2026	Josh Durand	Bianca Vernon

== Honours ==
=== All-Star Five / All First Team ===
Season	Men's			Women's		
Season	Players	Nationality	Teams	Players	Nationality	Teams
2019	Demarcus Gatlin	United States	Geelong Supercats	Kelly Wilson	Australia	Bendigo Braves
2019	Ray Turner	United States	Bendigo Braves	Lauren Nicholson	Australia	Kilsyth Cobras
2019	Jerry Evans Jr.	United States	Ballarat Miners	Rebecca Cole	Australia	Dandenong Rangers
2019	Dane Pineau	Australia	Melbourne Tigers	Lauren Scherf	Australia	Knox Raiders
2019	Simon Conn	Australia	Nunawading Spectres	Ezi Magbegor	Australia	Geelong Supercats
2020	Season cancelled					
2021	Season cancelled					
2022	Shea Ili	New Zealand	Sandringham Sabres	Alicia Froling	Australia	Knox Raiders
2022	Michael Harris	Australia	Mount Gambier Pioneers	Tess Madgen	Australia	Bendigo Braves
2022	Harry Froling	Australia	Hobart Chargers	Keely Froling	Australia	Launceston Tornadoes
2022	Dejan Vasiljevic	Australia	Diamond Valley Eagles	Alice Kunek	Australia	Nunawading Spectres
2022	Kuany Kuany	South Sudan	Bendigo Braves	Marena Whittle	Australia	Ringwood Hawks
2023	Ben Ayre	Australia	Sandringham Sabres	Chloe Bibby	Australia	Frankston Blues
2023	Daniel Trist	Australia	Frankston Blues	Kelly Wilson	Australia	Bendigo Braves
2023	Gabe Hadley	Australia	Geelong United Supercats	Marena Whittle	Australia	Ringwood Hawks
2023	Jack Purchase	Australia	Melbourne Tigers	Megan McKay	Australia	Bendigo Braves
2023	Tyler Rudolph	United States	Ballarat Miners	Miela Goodchild	Australia	Mount Gambier Pioneers
2024	Akech Aliir	Australia	Mount Gambier Pioneers	Amy Atwell	Australia	Bendigo Braves
2024	Tanner Krebs	Australia	Sandringham Sabres	Chloe Bibby	Australia	Ballarat Miners
2024	Nick Marshall	Australia	Mount Gambier Pioneers	Isabelle Bourne	Australia	Keilor Thunder
2024	Tyler Rudolph	United States	Ballarat Miners	Alicia Froling	Australia	Knox Raiders
2024	Daniel Trist	Australia	Frankston Blues	Stephanie Reid	Australia	Frankston Blues
2025	Akech Aliir	Australia	Mount Gambier Pioneers	Louise Brown	Australia	Frankston Blues
2025	Ben Ayre	Australia	Sandringham Sabres	Alicia Froling	Australia	Knox Raiders
2025	Michael Harris	Australia	Frankston Blues	Hannah Hank	Australia	Geelong United
2025	Keli Leaupepe	Australia	Knox Raiders	Maddison Rocci	Australia	Keilor Thunder
2025	Tom Wilson	Australia	Melbourne Tigers	Jaz Shelley	Australia	Geelong United
2026	Christian D'Angelo	Australia	Nunawading Spectres	Isabelle Bourne	Australia	Keilor Thunder
2026	Harry Froling	Australia	Dandenong Rangers	Lil Dart	Australia	Eltham Wildcats
2026	Jacob Richards	Australia	Hobart Chargers	Abbey Ellis	Australia	Diamond Valley Eagles
2026	Trazarien White	Australia	Knox Raiders	Dallas Loughridge	Australia	Casey Cavaliers
2026	Tom Wilson	Australia	Melbourne Tigers	Stephanie Reid	Australia	Sandringham Sabres

=== Club of the Year ===
Season	Club
2019	Bendigo Braves
2020	Season cancelled
2021	Season cancelled
2022	Knox Raiders
2023	Mount Gambier Pioneers
2024	Ballarat Miners
2025	Melbourne Tigers
2026	Melbourne Tigers
