= Jaz Shelley =

Australian basketball player (born 2000)

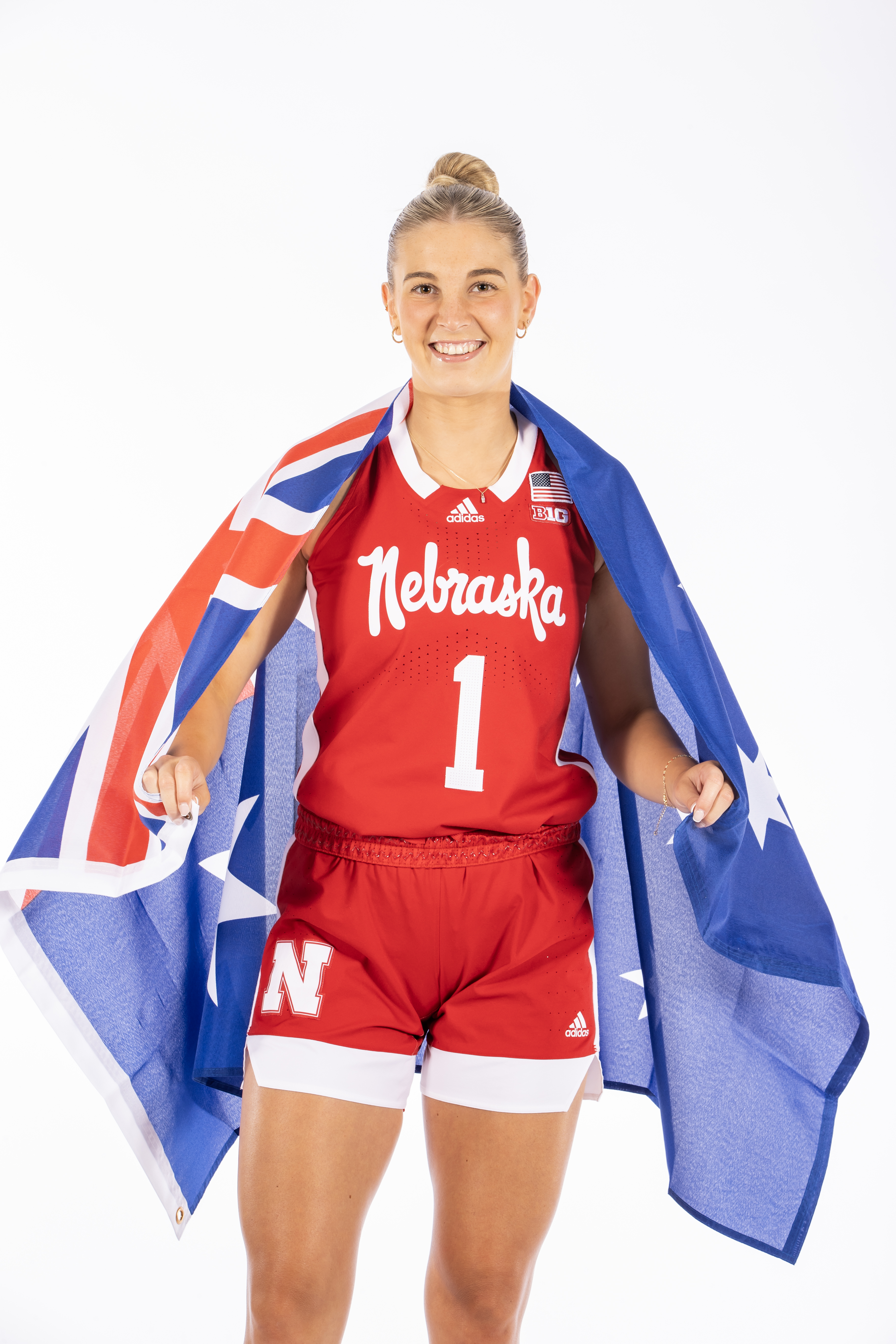
- Shelley with Nebraska in 2023

Sydney Flames
- Position: Point guard
- League: WNBL

Personal information
- Born: 13 May 2000 (age 26) Traralgon, Victoria, Australia
- Listed height: 5 ft 9 in (1.75 m)

Career information
- High school: Berwick College (Berwick, Victoria)
- College: Oregon (2019–2021); Nebraska (2021–2024)
- WNBA draft: 2024: 3rd round, 29th overall pick
- Drafted by: Phoenix Mercury
- Playing career: 2015–present

Career history
- 2015: Southern Peninsula Sharks
- 2016–2017: BA Centre of Excellence
- 2018: Southern Peninsula Sharks
- 2018–2019: Melbourne Boomers
- 2019: Geelong Supercats
- 2024: Ballarat Miners
- 2024–2026: Geelong United/Venom
- 2025: Geelong United NBL1
- 2026: Norths Bears
- 2026–present: Sydney Flames

Career highlights
- NBL1 East Most Valuable Player (2026); NBL1 East All-Star Five (2026); NBL1 South Most Valuable Player (2025); NBL1 South All First Team (2025); NBL1 South Golden Hands Award (2025); WNBL Rookie of the Year (2019); Big V All-Star Five (2018); First-team All-Big Ten – Coaches (2023); 3× Second-team All-Big Ten – Media (2022–2024); 2× Second-team All-Big Ten – Coaches (2022, 2024); Big Ten All-Defensive Team – Media (2022)
- Stats at Basketball Reference
Medals
Women's basketball
Representing Australia
FIBA Asia Cup
Bronze medal – third place	2021 Jordan	Team
FIBA Under-19 World Cup
Silver medal – second place	2019 Thailand	Team
FIBA Under-18 Asian Championship
Bronze medal – third place	2018 India	Team
FIBA Oceania Under-18 Championship
Gold medal – first place	2016 Fiji	Team
FIBA Under-17 World Championship
Gold medal – first place	2016 Spain	Team
FIBA Oceania Under-16 Championship
Gold medal – first place	2015 New Zealand	Team

Jazmin Pamela Shelley (born 13 May 2000) is an Australian professional basketball player for the Sydney Flames of the Women's National Basketball League (WNBL). She was drafted by the Phoenix Mercury in the 2024 WNBA draft. A point guard, she began her college basketball career with the Oregon Ducks before transferring to the Nebraska Cornhuskers after her sophomore season. In her first year with the Cornhuskers, Shelley was a second-team All-Big Ten selection, before making the coaches' first-team in her next season. She returned for a fifth college season and earned second-team All-Big Ten honors. Shelley previously played for the Melbourne Boomers of the WNBL, where she was named WNBL Rookie of the Year in 2019. Between 2024 and 2026, she played for Geelong United/Venom in the WNBL. In 2025, she won the NBL1 South Most Valuable Player as a member of the Geelong United NBL1 team. In 2026, she was named NBL1 East MVP as a member of the Norths Bears.

Shelley plays for the Australian national team and is a three-time gold medalist at the junior level.

== Early life and career ==
Shelley was born on 13 May 2000 to Phil and Carolyn Shelley, in Traralgon, Victoria. She grew up in Moe, Victoria, playing basketball, netball and soccer and competing in the high jump before deciding to focus on basketball. Shelley competed for her state team Victoria Country at the youth level and was named captain of the under-16 team in 2015. In her youth career, she also played for the Moe Meteors of the Country Basketball League, and the Southern Peninsula Sharks. In 2017, Shelley led Victoria Country to its first under-18 national title since 2000, recording 13 points and five rebounds in the final. She attended Berwick Secondary College in Berwick, Victoria, and led its team to two Victorian College Championships in 2018, including one at the 3x3 tournament.

After debuting for the Southern Peninsula Sharks in the Big V in 2015, Shelley moved to Canberra in 2016 to train full-time at the Australian Institute of Sport (AIS). She played for the BA Centre of Excellence in the South East Australian Basketball League (SEABL) in 2016 and 2017. She returned to the Southern Peninsula Sharks for the 2018 Big V season, where she averaged 17.9 points, 5.2 rebounds, 5.0 assists and 3.6 steals per game. She subsequently earned Big V All-Star Five honours.

On 16 March 2018, Shelley signed an amateur contract with the Melbourne Boomers of the Women's National Basketball League (WNBL) for the 2018–19 season. After helping the Boomers reach the semifinals, she was named WNBL Rookie of the Year. She received the Basketball Victoria Junior Female Athlete of the Year award for 2018.

On 4 March 2019, Shelley signed with the Geelong Supercats of the NBL1 for the 2019 season. She averaged 10.5 points, 3.5 rebounds and 2.7 assists per game, helping her team achieve a runner-up finish.

=== Recruiting ===
Shelley was considered a three-star recruit and 28th-best point guard in the 2019 high school class by ESPN. She was encouraged to play college basketball in the United States because her brother, Luke, had enjoyed the experience. In October 2018, Shelley committed to Oregon over offers from Oregon State and Nebraska. She was drawn to Oregon by its facilities and culture, with many international players on the team, and felt that the program would prepare her for a professional career.

== College career ==
=== Oregon ===
As a freshman at Oregon in 2019–20, Shelley was a backup to Sabrina Ionescu and served as a three-point specialist. On 16 December 2019, she made her first career start with Satou Sabally not playing. During the game, Shelley scored a season-high 32 points and set a program single-game record with 10 three-pointers in an 84–41 win over UC Riverside. She helped Oregon win regular season and tournament championships in the Pac-12 Conference. Her team was among the favourites to win the 2020 NCAA tournament, which was canceled due to the COVID-19 pandemic. She played in all 33 games, averaging 6.3 points, 1.5 assists and 1 rebound per game. She was selected to the Pac-12 All-Freshman honorable mention. In May 2020, she was named Basketball Victoria Junior Female Athlete of the Year for her second time.

As a sophomore in 2020–21, Shelley was expected to replace Ionescu as a starting point guard but struggled in her new role, playing fewer minutes despite starting in half of her appearances. On 1 January 2021, Shelley scored a season-high 13 points in a 92–69 victory over USC. She averaged 4 points, 1.9 assists and 1.7 rebounds per game. After the season, Shelley entered the transfer portal. She made the decision because coaches and players with whom she had a close relationship had left the program.

=== Nebraska ===
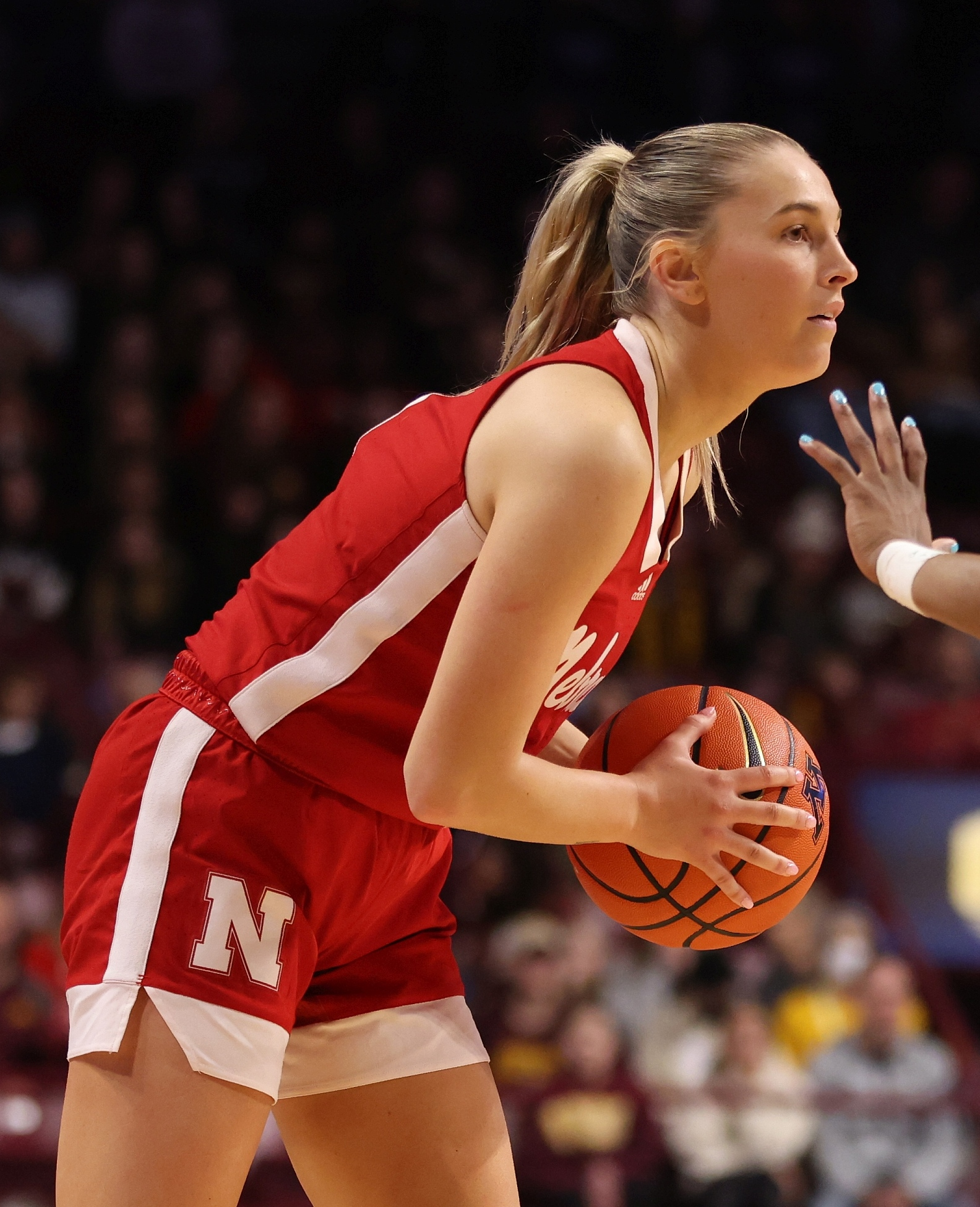
Shelley with the Cornhuskers in 2024

On 13 April 2021, Shelley announced that she would transfer to Nebraska. She had also considered Iowa State and professional options in Australia. Shelley chose Nebraska because of her relationship with the coaching staff and to play alongside her longtime friend, Isabelle Bourne. She immediately assumed a leading role and made an all-around impact. On 20 November, she registered the fourth triple-double in program history, with 14 points, 10 rebounds and 10 assists in 20 minutes, helping her team defeat North Carolina Central, 113–58. In her next game on 26 November, Shelley scored 30 points and shot 8-of-9 from the field in a 65–53 win over Drexel. In the first round of the 2022 Big Ten tournament, she scored 32 points and made a program-record nine three-pointers, tied for most in tournament history, in a 92–74 win over Illinois. Shelley averaged 13.1 points, 6.3 rebounds and 5 assists per game in the 2021–22 season. She was named second-team All-Big Ten and was a media selection for the All-Defensive Team. She led her team in scoring, assists, steals and blocks.

On 15 February 2023, Shelley scored a career-high 37 points, including 17 in the fourth quarter, in a 95–92 loss to Minnesota. She averaged 14.5 points, 6.2 assists and 4.8 rebounds per game as a senior in 2022–23, earning first-team All-Big Ten honors from the league's coaches and second-team honors from the media.

Shelley opted to return for her fifth season of eligibility, which was granted due to the COVID-19 pandemic. On 11 February 2024, she scored 23 points in helping Nebraska upset #2 Iowa. This led to her being named AP National Player of the Week, the first in program history. She averaged 13.4 points, 5.7 assists and 4.3 rebounds and 1.6 steals during the 2023–24 season and earned a spot on the Big Ten All-Tournament Team after setting Huskers' tournament records for points, assists and made 3-pointers. She finished her career fourth in Nebraska history in made 3-pointers and as of 2024, was the only player to have recorded two triple-doubles.

=== College statistics ===
Legend
GP	Games played	GS	Games started	MPG	Minutes per game
FG%	Field goal percentage	3P%	3-point field goal percentage	FT%	Free throw percentage
RPG	Rebounds per game	APG	Assists per game	SPG	Steals per game
BPG	Blocks per game	PPG	Points per game	**Bold**	Career high

Year	Team	GP	Points	FG%	3P%	FT%	RPG	APG	SPG	BPG	PPG
2019–20	Oregon	33	209	**42.5%**	**42.0%**	62.5%	1.0	1.5	0.7	0.1	6.3
2020–21	Oregon	22	87	35.4%	33.3%	37.5%	1.7	1.9	1.0	0.2	4.0
2021–22	Nebraska	33	418	42.5%	40.6%	77.3%	**6.3**	5.0	**1.8**	0.9	13.1
2022–23	Nebraska	33	**478**	38.9%	36.1%	**82.0%**	4.8	**6.2**	1.7	**0.7**	**14.5**
Career		120	1192	40.3%	38.4%	76.1%	3.6	3.8	1.3	0.5	9.9

== Professional career ==
On 15 April 2024, Shelley was selected by the Phoenix Mercury with the 29th overall pick in the 2024 WNBA draft. She was waived by the Mercury on 11 May 2024.

On 24 May 2024, Shelley signed with the Ballarat Miners of the NBL1 South for the rest of the 2024 NBL1 season. In 12 games, she averaged 12.58 points, 5.75 rebounds, 4.67 assists and 1.83 steals per game.

On 5 June 2024, Shelley signed with Geelong United of the Women's National Basketball League (WNBL) for the 2024–25 season.

Shelley joined the Geelong United NBL1 team for the 2025 NBL1 South season. She was named NBL1 South Most Valuable Player and NBL1 South All First Team, and earned the league's Golden Hands Award. She helped the team reach the NBL1 South Grand Final, where they lost 84–64 to the Knox Raiders with Shelley scoring a team-high 19 points.

Shelley re-joined Geelong, now known as the Venom, for the 2025–26 WNBL season. She was named co-captain of the Venom. She led the league in steals (2.57 per game) alongside averaging 12.9 points, 4.1 assists and 3.7 rebounds per game.

On 4 March 2026, Shelley signed with the Norths Bears of the NBL1 East for the 2026 season. On 16 May 2026, she recorded 32 points and 12 steals in a 106–52 win over the Central Coast Crusaders. She was named NBL1 East MVP and earned All-Star Five honours.

On 1 May 2026, Shelley signed a two-year deal with the Sydney Flames.

== National team career ==
=== Junior national team ===
Shelley represented Australia at the 2015 FIBA Under-16 Oceania Championship in New Zealand. She averaged 18.8 points, 3.3 steals and 3 assists per game, leading the tournament in each category, and helped her team win a gold medal. Shelley was named to the Australian team for the 2016 FIBA Oceania Under-18 Championship in Fiji. She averaged 13.8 points, 4 rebounds and 4 steals per game, winning another gold medal and being named to the all-tournament team. At the semifinals of the 2016 FIBA Under-17 World Championship in Spain, she scored 23 points to lead Australia to a 73–63 upset win over the United States, who had previously been undefeated in the tournament's four-year history. Shelley averaged 8.3 points, 3.8 rebounds and 3 assists per game, helping her team win the gold medal. She was a member of the bronze medal-winning Australian team at the 2018 FIBA Under-18 Asian Championship in India, averaging 8.8 points, 7 rebounds and 4.8 assists per game. Shelley averaged 8.6 points, 5.4 rebounds and 3.7 assists per game at the 2019 FIBA Under-19 World Cup in Thailand, where Australia won the silver medal.

=== Senior national team ===
Shelley earned her first selection to the Australian senior national team in July 2020, making the 23-player preliminary roster for the 2020 Summer Olympics. She was not named to the final roster. Shelley played for Australia at the 2021 FIBA Asia Cup in Jordan, where she averaged four points in under 13 minutes per game, as her team won the bronze medal.

== Personal life ==
Shelley's parents, Phil and Carolyn, both played competitive basketball and her father became a shooting coach. She has two brothers, Luke and Austin, and one sister, Sam. Her brothers have both played college basketball: Luke at Kentucky Wesleyan and Austin at West Texas A&M. She graduated from the University of Nebraska–Lincoln with a degree in advertising and public relations.
