= Tom Wilson (basketball) =

Australian rules footballer and basketball player

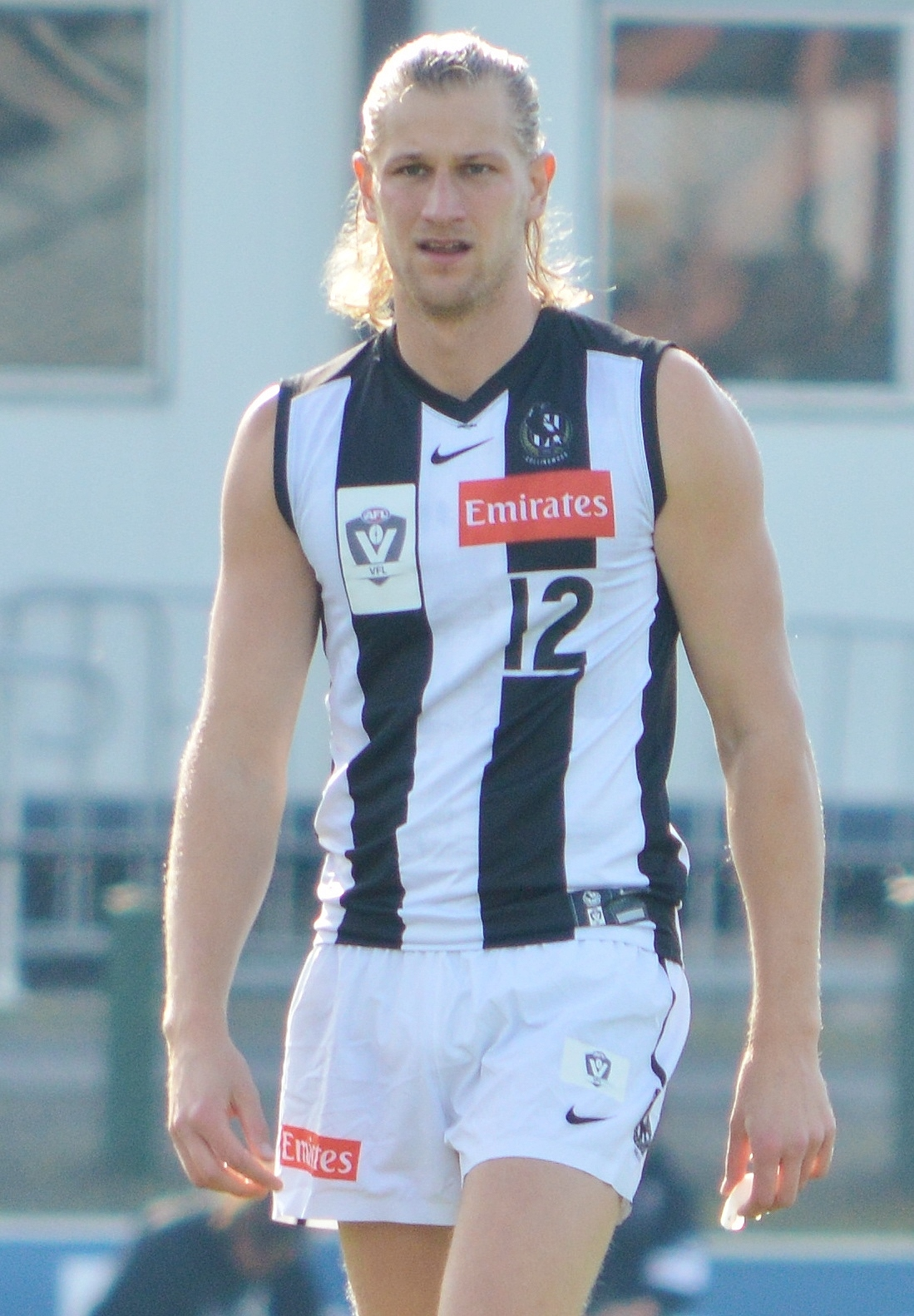
- Wilson playing with Collingwood's VFL side in 2021

No. 12 – Melbourne United
- Position: Point guard
- League: NBL

Personal information
- Born: 24 June 1997 (age 29) Melbourne, Victoria, Australia
- Listed height: 194 cm (6 ft 4 in)
- Listed weight: 82 kg (181 lb)

Career information
- High school: Caulfield Grammar School (Melbourne, Victoria)
- College: SMU (2016–2017)
- Playing career: 2014–2019; 2024–present

Career history
- 2014–2015: BA Centre of Excellence
- 2016: Frankston Blues
- 2017–2018: Melbourne Tigers
- 2018–2019: Sydney Kings
- 2024–2026: Melbourne Tigers
- 2025–present: Melbourne United

Career highlights
- NBL1 South Most Valuable Player (2025); 2× All-NBL1 South First Team (2025, 2026); SEABL Most Valuable Player (2018); All-SEABL First Team (2018); 2× SEABL Youth Player of the Year (2017, 2018)

Thomas Glen Joseph Wilson (born 24 June 1997) is an Australian basketball player and former football player for Melbourne United of the National Basketball League (NBL). After playing basketball competitively between 2014 and 2019, he switched codes and joined the Collingwood Football Club of the Australian Football League (AFL). He returned to basketball in 2024 after playing eight games in five seasons for Collingwood.

Wilson played a season of college basketball in the United States for the SMU Mustangs in 2016–17. In 2018, he was named Most Valuable Player of the South East Australian Basketball League playing for the Melbourne Tigers and went on to play for the Sydney Kings in the NBL in the 2018–19 season. In 2025, he was named NBL1 South Most Valuable Player as member of the Melbourne Tigers.

== Early life ==
Wilson was born in Melbourne, Victoria, in the suburb of St Kilda East. As a junior, Wilson played basketball for the Sandringham Sabres and Melbourne Tigers. He attended Caulfield Grammar School, and in 2012, he was a member of their Australian Schools Championship winning side. He also played Australian rules football as a junior, representing Victoria in the 2013 NAB AFL U16 Championship. Shortly after, Wilson was awarded a NAB AFL Level 1 scholarship.

== Basketball career ==
=== Early years ===
In 2014, Wilson joined Basketball Australia's Centre of Excellence (COE) at the Australian Institute of Sport in Canberra, opting for the COE scholarship over the NAB AFL Level 1 scholarship. He played for the CoE men's team in the South East Australian Basketball League (SEABL) in 2014 and 2015.

There were a number of U.S. colleges looking at Wilson after he played well for Australia's under-17 side at the 2014 FIBA Under-17 World Championship. In November 2015, he signed with SMU and coach Larry Brown.

During the 2015–16 NBL season, Wilson spent time with Melbourne United as a development player. In 2016, he played for the Frankston Blues in the SEABL alongside his brother Jack. In nine games for Frankston, he averaged 11.1 points per game.

=== College ===
Wilson joined the SMU Mustangs for the 2016–17 season, but after just 10 games he decided to transfer in December 2016. He averaged 1.6 points, 1.0 rebounds, and 0.5 assists, in 6.1 minutes per game.

In January 2017, Wilson committed to Boise State University. However, in February, he made the decision to turn professional, due to NCAA rules indicating that Wilson would have to sit out a year before taking the court for the Broncos.

=== Professional ===
In 2017, Wilson played for the Melbourne Tigers in the SEABL. In 17 games, he averaged 19.7 points, 5.6 rebounds and 2.4 assists per game.

On 10 August 2017, Wilson signed a three-year deal with Serbian club Partizan. After a contract dispute forced him out of Partizan, Wilson spent the second half of the 2017–18 NBL season on the Sydney Kings' training roster.

Wilson re-joined the Melbourne Tigers for the 2018 SEABL season. He was named SEABL Player of the Week for round six and seven. He was also named Player of the Month for May. At the season's end, he was named the SEABL MVP alongside All-SEABL First Team and a second consecutive Australian Youth Player of the Year. In 19 games, he averaged 24.9 points, 8.1 rebounds and 4.1 assists per game.

On 19 April 2018, Wilson signed a 'one plus one' deal with the Sydney Kings, with the club holding the option on a second year. He scored 10 points in 12 games during the 2018–19 NBL season. The Kings took up the second-year option on 29 March 2019, but on 8 April 2019, he made the decision to switch codes to Australian rules football.

On 23 February 2024, Wilson signed with the Melbourne Tigers of the NBL1 South for the 2024 season. In 17 games, he averaged 19.06 points, 6.29 rebounds, 5.06 assists and 1.0 steals per game.

On 22 December 2024, Wilson re-signed with the Tigers for the 2025 NBL1 South season. He was named NBL1 South Most Valuable Player and NBL1 South All First Team. He helped the team reach the NBL1 South Grand Final, where they lost 99–80 to the Sandringham Sabres, with Wilson scoring 17 points.

On 14 April 2025, Wilson signed with Melbourne United for the 2025–26 NBL season. He appeared in 27 games for United, scoring a career-best 12 points off the bench in Round 2 against the New Zealand Breakers.

Wilson re-joined the Tigers for the 2026 NBL1 South season. He was named to the All-NBL1 South First Team for the second straight year.

On 30 July 2026, Wilson re-signed with Melbourne United for the 2026–27 NBL season.

=== National team ===
Wilson debuted for Australia at the 2013 FIBA Oceania Under-16 Championship, averaging 5.3 points, 4.3 rebounds and 2.3 assists per game. In 2014, he competed at the FIBA Under-17 World Championship and the FIBA Oceania Under-18 Championship. At the FIBA Under-17 World Championship in Dubai, Wilson helped Australia reach the gold medal game, where they lost to the USA 99–92 despite a 23-point effort from Wilson. For the tournament, Wilson averaged 12.3 points, 6.6 rebounds and 1.7 assists per game. In 2015, at the FIBA Under-19 World Championship, he averaged 6.4 points, 4.4 rebounds and 2.8 assists per game. In March 2019, he made his debut for the Australian Boomers.

In February 2026, Wilson was named in the Boomers squad for two FIBA World Cup Asian qualifiers. In August 2026, he was named in the squad for two more Asian qualifiers. In November 2026, he was named in the squad for two more Asian qualifiers.

== AFL career ==
Tom Wilson

Personal information
- Born: 24 June 1997 (age 29); Melbourne, Victoria
- Debut: Round 9, 2021, Collingwood vs. Sydney, at Sydney Cricket Ground
- Height: 194 cm (6 ft 4 in)
- Weight: 86 kg (190 lb)
- Position: Midfielder / Forward

Playing career^{1}
| Years | Club | Games (Goals) |
| 2019–2023 | Collingwood | 8 (2) |
- ^{1} Playing statistics correct to the end of the 2023 season.

=== Collingwood (2019–2023) ===
On 3 May 2019, it was announced that Wilson had signed with Collingwood of the Australian Football League (AFL) on a three-year category B rookie contract. He impressed in Collingwood's VFL side on the wing and as a rebounding half-back and subsequently made his AFL debut on 15 May 2021 against Sydney. After the 2023 AFL season, Wilson was delisted by the club after playing eight games in five seasons.

=== Statistics ===
Updated to the end of the 2023 season.

Legend
| G | Goals | K | Kicks | D | Disposals | T | Tackles |
| B | Behinds | H | Handballs | M | Marks |

| Season | Team | No. | Games | Totals | | | | | | | Averages (per game) | | | | | | |
| Season | Team | No. | Games | G | B | K | H | D | M | T | G | B | K | H | D | M | T |
|---|---|---|---|---|---|---|---|---|---|---|---|---|---|---|---|---|---|
| 2019 | Collingwood | 48 | 0 | — | — | — | — | — | — | — | — | — | — | — | — | — | — |
| 2020 | Collingwood | 48 | 0 | — | — | — | — | — | — | — | — | — | — | — | — | — | — |
| 2021 | Collingwood | 12 | 4 | 0 | 0 | 25 | 23 | 48 | 7 | 7 | 0.0 | 0.0 | 6.3 | 5.8 | 12.0 | 1.8 | 1.8 |
| 2022 | Collingwood | 12 | 3 | 2 | 0 | 15 | 8 | 23 | 5 | 2 | 0.7 | 0.0 | 5.0 | 2.7 | 7.7 | 1.7 | 0.7 |
| 2023 | Collingwood | 12 | 1 | 0 | 0 | 2 | 3 | 5 | 2 | 1 | 0.0 | 0.0 | 2.0 | 3.0 | 5.0 | 2.0 | 1.0 |
| Career | | | 8 | 2 | 0 | 42 | 34 | 76 | 14 | 10 | 0.3 | 0.0 | 5.3 | 4.3 | 9.5 | 1.8 | 1.3 |
