= NBL Next Generation Award =

The National Basketball League Next Generation Award is an annual National Basketball League (NBL) award given since the 2022–23 NBL season to the best player under the age of 25. As of the 2023–24 season, the head coach, assistant coach and captain of each team vote for the Next Generation Award.

In January 2023, the NBL announced the introduction of the Next Generation Award as a replacement award for Rookie of the Year. All players under the age of 25 at the conclusion of each season are eligible to win the Next Generation Award.

== Winners ==
Year	Player	Nationality	Team	Ref
2022–23	Sam Waardenburg	New Zealand	Cairns Taipans	
2023–24	Sam Froling	Australia	Illawarra Hawks	
2024–25	Alex Toohey	Australia	Sydney Kings	
2025–26	Sam Mennenga	New Zealand	New Zealand Breakers	
