= Isabelle Bourne =

Australian basketball player (born 2000)

- Bourne with the Australian Opals in 2026

No. 34 – Sydney Flames
- Position: Forward
- League: WNBL

Personal information
- Born: 21 November 2000 (age 25)
- Listed height: 188 cm (6 ft 2 in)

Career information
- High school: Daramalan College (Canberra, ACT)
- College: Nebraska (2019–2023)
- WNBA draft: 2023: undrafted
- Playing career: 2016–present

Career history
- 2016: Canberra Capitals Academy
- 2016–2017: Canberra Capitals
- 2017–2018: BA Centre of Excellence
- 2018–2019: Canberra Capitals
- 2019: Geelong Supercats
- 2023: Canberra Nationals
- 2023–2025: Adelaide Lightning
- 2024–2026: Keilor Thunder
- 2025–2026: Southside Flyers
- 2026–present: Sydney Flames

Career highlights
- WNBL champion (2019); NBL1 South Most Valuable Player (2024); 2× NBL1 South All-Star Five / First Team (2024, 2026); NBL1 South All Second Team (2025); NBL1 East All-Star Five (2023)
Medals
Women's basketball
Representing Australia
Asia Cup
Gold medal – first place	2025 China
FIBA Under-19 World Cup
Silver medal – second place	2019 Thailand	Team
FIBA Under-17 Oceania Cup
Gold medal – first place	2017 Guam	Team

Isabelle Bourne (born 21 November 2000) is an Australian professional basketball player for the Sydney Flames of the Women's National Basketball League (WNBL). She began her career in Canberra, debuting for the Canberra Capitals in the WNBL in 2016–17 and playing in the South East Australian Basketball League (SEABL) for the BA Centre of Excellence. She played four years of college basketball in the United States for the Nebraska Cornhuskers between 2019 and 2023 before returning to Australia to start her professional career in the WNBL. She played for the Adelaide Lightning between 2023 and 2025. In 2024, she was named the NBL1 South Most Valuable Player playing for the Keilor Thunder.

== Early life and career ==
Bourne is a product of the Norths Junior Club in Canberra and Basketball ACT high performance programs. She represented ACT at both the U16 and U18 National Junior Championships. She attended Daramalan College in Canberra.

In 2016, Bourne played for the Canberra Capitals Academy in the South East Australian Basketball League (SEABL). In 17 games, she averaged 7.1 points and 4.5 rebounds per game.

Bourne joined the University of Canberra Capitals of the Women's National Basketball League (WNBL) as a development player for the 2016–17 season. She appeared in one game during the season.

Bourne joined the BA Centre of Excellence as a scholarship athlete in 2017. She played for the Centre of Excellence in the SEABL, averaging 6.4 points and 4.0 rebounds in 14 games in 2017, and 11.2 points, 5.4 rebounds and 1.4 assists in 20 games in 2018.

Bourne re-joined the Canberra Capitals for the 2018–19 WNBL season, where she once again appeared in one game. The Capitals won the WNBL championship in 2018–19.

Bourne joined the Geelong Supercats of the NBL1 for the league's inaugural season in 2019. She missed the NBL1 finals due to leaving for the U.S. to start her college career. In 15 games, she averaged 9.0 points, 5.9 rebounds, 1.5 assists and 1.1 steals per game.

== College career ==
In November 2018, Bourne signed a National Letter of Intent to play college basketball for the University of Nebraska–Lincoln. She moved to the United States in 2019 to join the Cornhuskers.

As a freshman in 2019–20, Bourne played all 30 games for the Cornhuskers and averaged 5.9 points and 4.4 rebounds per game. She closed her first season with a season-high 16 points and a career-high five blocks against Michigan in the Big Ten Tournament on 5 March 2020. She added six rebounds, an assist and a steal in a season-high 29 minutes against the Wolverines. The COVID-19 pandemic ended her season prematurely, as she expedited her return to Australia in March 2020 due to border closers. She completed online classes from Australia.

As a sophomore in 2020–21, Bourne played in 22 games with 21 starts, averaging 13.6 points, 7.5 rebounds and 2.5 assists per game. In December 2020, she played against her sister Callie when Nebraska played Idaho State. She missed four games mid-season with an ankle injury. She scored a season-high-tying 22 points against Purdue on 23 December 2020. She had 21 points and a career-high 17 rebounds against Northwestern on 17 February and a season-high-tying 22 points to go with 11 rebounds against Penn State on 21 February. She was subsequently named Big Ten Conference Player of the Week for the first time and went on to earn honorable mention All-Big Ten accolades.

As a junior in 2021–22, Bourne earned honorable mention All-Big Ten accolades for the second time after averaging 11.1 points and 4.5 rebounds in 24 minutes per game as a starter. She scored in double figures 20 times, including a career-high 23 points against Alabama A&M on 14 November 2021. Her best friend, Jaz Shelley, joined Nebraska in 2021–22.

As a senior in 2022–23, Bourne earned honorable mention All-Big Ten accolades for the third time after averaging 12.6 points and 6.7 rebounds per game. She scored double digits in 21 of 30 games, including three 20-point games. She also produced six double-digit rebound contests, including five double-doubles. She had a season-high 21 points in the season opener and matched that with another 21-point game in February 2023.

Bourne chose to forego a potential fifth season of eligibility to return to Australia to start her professional career. She finished her four-year career with 115 games and 82 starts. She finished No. 21 on Nebraska's all-time scoring list 1,221 points and No. 15 on the Husker career rebounding chart with 648 boards. She became one of only 14 players in school history to reach the combined career milestones of 1,200 points and 600 rebounds. She served as the team's co-captain as a sophomore, junior and senior.

== Professional career ==
In May 2023, Bourne joined the Canberra Nationals of the NBL1 East for the rest of the 2023 season. She was named to the NBL1 East All-Star Five. In 10 games, she averaged 19.1 points, 7.6 rebounds, 3.0 assists, 1.4 steals and 1.0 blocks per game.

On 22 June 2023, Bourne signed a two-year deal with the Adelaide Lightning of the WNBL. In 21 games during the 2023–24 season, she averaged 13.4 points, 4.0 rebounds and 1.5 assists per game.

Bourne joined the Keilor Thunder of the NBL1 South for the 2024 season to play under new coach, Kristi Harrower. She helped the Thunder reach the NBL1 South Grand Final, where they lost 87–82 despite 24 points, eight rebounds and five assists from Bourne. She was named the NBL1 South Most Valuable Player and earned NBL1 South All-Star Five honours. In 25 games, she averaged 20.0 points, 9.2 rebounds, 2.6 assists and 1.5 steals per game.

Bourne re-joined the Adelaide Lightning for the 2024–25 WNBL season. She was considered one of the Lightning's standouts throughout preseason. In 21 games, she averaged 13.0 points, 4.0 rebounds and 1.6 assists per game.

Bourne re-joined the Keilor Thunder for the 2025 NBL1 South season. She was named NBL1 South All Second Team. In 14 games, she averaged 22.93 points, 9.43 rebounds, 2.5 assists, 1.07 steals and 1.21 blocks per game.

On 26 June 2025, Bourne signed a two-year deal with the Southside Flyers. She parted ways with the Flyers after one season.

Bourne re-joined the Keilor Thunder for the 2026 NBL1 South season. She was named to the All-NBL1 South First Team.

On 8 May 2026, Bourne signed with the Sydney Flames for the 2026–27 WNBL season.

== National team career ==
Bourne led the Australia under-17 team to gold at the 2017 Oceania Championship in Guam by averaging 19 points, 9.8 rebounds and 2.6 assists to claim a spot on the all-tournament team. She was also the MVP of the 2017 FIBA 3x3 Asia Cup in Mongolia with the Australia 3x3 team, leading her team to another gold medal. Bourne was also named to the Australian Gems squad for the 2018 FIBA Under-18 Asian Championships.

In 2019, Bourne helped the Gems to a silver medal at the FIBA Under-19 Women's World Cup in Thailand. She averaged 8.4 points, 5.1 rebounds and 1.1 assists in 23.1 minutes per game.

In February 2025, Bourne was named in her first Australian Opals squad. The following month, she was named in the Australia 3x3 team for the FIBA 3x3 Champions Cup in Bangkok, Thailand. She helped the team win the 3x3 Champions Cup bronze medal. In May 2025, Bourne was named in the Opals squad for the 2025 FIBA Women's Asia Cup in China. She helped the Opals win gold.

In July 2026, Bourne was named in the final Opals squad for the 2026 FIBA Women's Basketball World Cup.

== Personal life ==
Bourne's father, Trent, played Australian rules football, while her mother, Ann, was a basketball player. Her older sister, Callie, was a five-year contributor at Idaho State, and her oldest sister, Emma, also played for the Canberra Capitals Academy.
