= Alex Toohey =

Australian basketball player (born 2004)

No. 22 – Santa Cruz Warriors
- Position: Small forward
- League: NBA G League

Personal information
- Born: 5 May 2004 (age 22) Canberra, ACT, Australia
- Listed height: 6 ft 8 in (2.03 m)
- Listed weight: 223 lb (101 kg)

Career information
- High school: Marist College Canberra (Canberra, ACT)
- NBA draft: 2025: 2nd round, 52nd overall pick
- Drafted by: Phoenix Suns
- Playing career: 2021–present

Career history
- 2021–2023: BA Centre of Excellence
- 2023–2025: Sydney Kings
- 2025; 2026–present: Santa Cruz Warriors

Career highlights
- NBL Next Generation Award (2025)
- Stats at NBA.com
- Stats at Basketball Reference

Alex Toohey (born 5 May 2004) is an Australian professional basketball player for the Santa Cruz Warriors of the NBA G League. He has played for the Sydney Kings of the National Basketball League (NBL). Toohey was drafted by the Phoenix Suns with the 52nd pick in the second round of the 2025 NBA draft where he was then subsequently traded to the Golden State Warriors.

== Early life and career ==
Toohey was born in Canberra, the capital of Australia. Growing up, he played both basketball and cricket, the latter of which his father had played. He decided to focus solely on basketball after receiving a call-up to the Australian national under-15 team for the Oceania Games. He attended Marist College Canberra and played for their team as well as with the Weston Creek Woden Dodgers.

In 2020, Toohey joined the NBA Academy and the BA Centre of Excellence. He played for the Academy for three seasons and received attention for his performance at the 2022 NBA Academy Games, where he was his team's leading scorer, placed second in steals and fifth in rebounds. In 2021, he played five games for the Centre of Excellence in the Waratah League. He went on to play nine games for the Centre of Excellence in the NBL1 in the 2022 season. In the 2023 NBL1 season, he led the team to the regular season championship in the NBL1 East and averaged 17.9 points, 5.8 rebounds and 2.7 assists per game.

Toohey committed to play college basketball in the U.S. for the Gonzaga Bulldogs in November 2022. However, he later retracted his commitment in June 2023.

== Professional career ==
Instead of playing college basketball, Toohey joined the National Basketball League's Next Stars Program and signed with the Sydney Kings on 24 June 2023. In his first season, he played in 29 games and averaged eight points and four rebounds. He opted to return to the Kings for the 2024–25 NBL season instead of entering the 2024 NBA draft. In 30 games, he averaged 10.5 points, 3.9 rebounds, 1.3 assists, 1.5 steals, and 0.8 blocks per game, on 45.2% from the field and 30.2% on three-pointers. He was named the recipient of the NBL Next Generation Award for the 2024–25 season.

Toohey was selected by the Phoenix Suns with the 52nd overall pick in the 2025 NBA draft. On 6 July 2025, his draft rights were then traded to the Golden State Warriors as part of a seven-team trade, involving Kevin Durant.

On 29 September 2025, he signed a two-way contract with the Warriors. He appeared in two games for the Santa Cruz Warriors in the NBA G League, and recorded no appearances for Golden State. On 8 December, Toohey was waived by the Warriors following a season-ending knee injury.

On 2 July, 2026, Toohey joined the Warriors for the 2026 NBA Summer League. On 10 September, he returned to Golden State, signing an Exhibit 10 contract.

== National team career ==
Toohey debuted for the Australia men's national basketball team in February 2021. He returned to the team for the FIBA World Cup qualification in 2022, scoring 12 points in 17 minutes played.

== Career statistics ==
Legend
| GP | Games played | GS | Games started | MPG | Minutes per game |
| FG% | Field goal percentage | 3P% | 3-point field goal percentage | FT% | Free throw percentage |
| RPG | Rebounds per game | APG | Assists per game | SPG | Steals per game |
| BPG | Blocks per game | PPG | Points per game | **Bold** | Career high |

=== NBL ===
| Year | Team | GP | GS | MPG | FG% | 3P% | FT% | RPG | APG | SPG | BPG | PPG |
|---|---|---|---|---|---|---|---|---|---|---|---|---|
| 2023–24 | Sydney | 29 | 25 | 21.5 | .443 | .254 | .685 | **4.0** | .8 | .5 | .5 | 8.0 |
| 2024–25 | Sydney | **30** | **26** | **22.9** | **.452** | **.302** | **.729** | 3.9 | **1.3** | **1.5** | **.8** | **10.5** |
