= Jack Purchase =

Australian basketball player (born 1995)

Melbourne Tigers
- Position: Forward
- League: NBL1 South

Personal information
- Born: 26 June 1995 (age 31) Melbourne, Victoria, Australia
- Listed height: 203 cm (6 ft 8 in)
- Listed weight: 94 kg (207 lb)

Career information
- High school: Carey Baptist Grammar (Melbourne, Victoria)
- College: Auburn (2014–2015); Hawaii (2016–2019)
- NBA draft: 2019: undrafted
- Playing career: 2012–present

Career history
- 2012–2014, 2019: Melbourne Tigers
- 2019–2020: Melbourne United
- 2021: Adelaide 36ers
- 2021: North Adelaide Rockets
- 2021: Hobart Chargers
- 2021–2022: Perth Wildcats
- 2022: Forestville Eagles
- 2023–present: Melbourne Tigers
- 2025: Hyderabad Falcons
- 2025–2026: Brisbane Bullets

Career highlights
- INBL Most Valuable Player (2025); INBL scoring champion (2025); NBL1 South Most Valuable Player (2023); NBL1 South All-Star Five (2023); 2× All-NBL1 South Second Team (2025, 2026); NBL1 Central All-Star Five (2022); Second-team All-Big West (2019); Big West Best Sixth Player (2018)

Jack Purchase (born 26 June 1995) is an Australian professional basketball player for the Melbourne Tigers of the NBL1 South. He played college basketball for the Auburn Tigers and Hawaii Rainbow Warriors.

== Early life ==
Purchase was born in Melbourne, Victoria, and attended Carey Baptist Grammar School. He played in the Big V for the Melbourne Tigers between 2012 and 2014.

== College career ==
Purchase played college basketball in the United States for the Auburn Tigers during the 2014–15 season but saw limited playing time and transferred to the Hawaii Rainbow Warriors. Purchase became an immediate starter for the Rainbow Warriors during his sophomore season in 2016–17. He was moved to the bench during his junior season and was named the Big West Best Sixth Player in 2018. Purchase returned to the starting line-up for his senior season and earned second-team All-Big West honours in 2019.

== Professional career ==
Purchase returned to Australia in 2019 and signed with the Melbourne Tigers of the NBL1 for the 2019 season. He then joined Melbourne United of the National Basketball League (NBL) as a development player for the 2019–20 season.

On 2 March 2021, Purchase signed with the Adelaide 36ers for the rest of the 2020–21 NBL season as an injury replacement for Isaac Humphries. During the 2021 NBL1 season, he played four games for the North Adelaide Rockets of the NBL1 Central and five games for the Hobart Chargers of the NBL1 South.

On 14 September 2021, Purchase signed a two-year deal with the Perth Wildcats. The final year of his contract was declined by the team.

Purchase joined the Forestville Eagles for the 2022 NBL1 Central season.

Purchase returned to the Melbourne Tigers for the 2023 NBL1 South season. He was named NBL1 South co-Most Valuable Player and earned All-Star Five honours. He re-joined the Tigers for the 2024 NBL1 South season. In 22 games, he averaged 15.95 points, 5.73 rebounds and 4.41 assists per game.

Purchase joined the Hyderabad Falcons of the Indian National Basketball League (INBL) for the 2025 season. His 172 points in the regular season led the league. He was subsequently named league MVP.

Purchase re-joined the Melbourne Tigers for the 2025 NBL1 South season. On 4 May 2025, he set a new NBL1 scoring record with 55 points and 10 3-pointers in an 87–85 loss to the Eltham Wildcats. He was named NBL1 South All Second Team. He helped the team reach the NBL1 South Grand Final, where they lost 99–80 to the Sandringham Sabres, with Purchase scoring 20 points.

On 7 August 2025, Purchase signed with the Brisbane Bullets for the 2025–26 NBL season. He took the number 12 jersey, the same number his father Nigel wore in the last season of his 250-game career in 1993.

Purchase re-joined the Melbourne Tigers for the 2026 NBL1 South season. On 28 June 2026, he recorded a triple-double with 14 points, 11 assists and 10 rebounds in a 99–76 win over the Dandenong Rangers. He was named All-NBL1 South Second Team for the second straight year.

In November 2026, Purchase re-signed with the Tigers for the 2027 NBL1 South season.

== Personal life ==
Purchase's father, Nigel, played in the NBL while his mother, Simone, played in the Women's National Basketball League (WNBL).

His father's sister is married to Australian basketball great, Andrew Gaze.
