= Harry Froling =

Australian basketball player (born 1998)

- Froling with the Illawarra Hawks in 2025

Tachikawa Dice
- Position: Centre
- League: B.League

Personal information
- Born: 20 April 1998 (age 28) Townsville, Queensland, Australia
- Listed height: 210 cm (6 ft 11 in)
- Listed weight: 123 kg (271 lb)

Career information
- High school: Pimlico State (Townsville, Queensland)
- College: SMU (2016–2017); Marquette (2017–2018)
- NBA draft: 2019: undrafted
- Playing career: 2014–present

Career history
- 2014–2015: BA Centre of Excellence
- 2015–2016: Townsville Heat
- 2015–2016: Townsville Crocodiles
- 2018: Townsville Heat
- 2018–2020: Adelaide 36ers
- 2019: Southern Huskies
- 2020: Spójnia Stargard
- 2020: RedCity Roar
- 2020–2021: Brisbane Bullets
- 2021: Mackay Meteors
- 2021–2022: Illawarra Hawks
- 2022: Hobart Chargers
- 2022–2023: Brisbane Bullets
- 2025: Taranaki Airs
- 2025: Melbourne Tigers
- 2025–2026: Illawarra Hawks
- 2026: Dandenong Rangers
- 2026–present: Tachikawa Dice

Career highlights
- NBL Rookie of the Year (2019); NBL1 South champion (2022); 2× QBL / NBL1 North champion (2018, 2021); QBL Finals MVP (2018); 2× NBL1 South All-Star Five / First Team (2022, 2026); NBL1 North All-Star Five (2021)
Medals
Men's basketball
Representing Australia
FIBA World U17 Championship
Silver medal – second place	2014 Dubai

Harrison Michael Froling (born 20 April 1998) is an Australian professional basketball player for the Tachikawa Dice of the Japanese B.League. He had a two-year college basketball career in the United States playing for the SMU Mustangs (2016–17) and the Marquette Golden Eagles (2017–18). In 2018, he joined the Adelaide 36ers of the National Basketball League (NBL) and earned NBL Rookie of the Year honours for the 2018–19 season. Froling's career was halted for two years when he suffered brain injuries after an assault in 2023.

== Early life and career ==
Froling was born in Townsville, Queensland, where he attended Pimlico State High School. In 2014, he moved to Canberra to attend the Australian Institute of Sport and play for the BA Centre of Excellence in the South East Australian Basketball League (SEABL). In 2015, he split his time between the BA Centre of Excellence in the SEABL and the Townsville Heat in the Queensland Basketball League (QBL).

Froling joined the Townsville Crocodiles of the National Basketball League (NBL) for the 2015–16 season, playing nine games as an injury replacement for Luke Schenscher. Following the NBL season, he returned to the Heat for the 2016 QBL season.

== College career ==
Froling moved to the United States to play college basketball for the SMU Mustangs in the 2016–17 season. However, he left the team in December 2016 and transferred to Marquette in January 2017. In 10 games for the Mustangs, he averaged 4.3 points and 3.2 rebounds in 14.6 minutes per game.

In the 2017–18 season, Froling played 20 games for the Marquette Golden Eagles. He was unable to debut until mid-December due to NCAA transfer rules. He averaged 2.8 points and 3.0 rebounds in 12.4 minutes per game.

== Professional career ==
Following the 2017–18 U.S. college season, Froling joined the Townsville Heat for the 2018 QBL season. He helped the Heat win the 2018 QBL championship, with Froling named finals MVP for his 27 points and 18 rebounds in game two. In 22 games, he averaged 19.7 points, 11.8 rebounds and 2.2 assists per game.

In April 2018, Froling signed a two-year deal with the Adelaide 36ers of the NBL. In the 2018–19 season, he won the NBL Rookie of the Year.

In 2019, Froling had a short stint with the Southern Huskies of the New Zealand NBL.

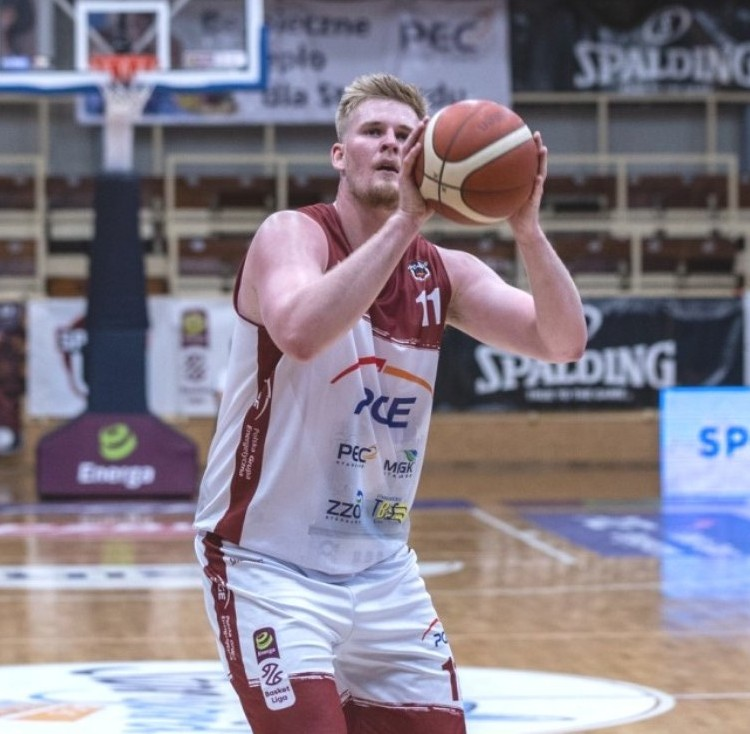
Froling with Spójnia Stargard in 2020

Froling returned to the 36ers for the 2019–20 NBL season. Following the NBL season, he moved to Poland to play for Spójnia Stargard and later played in the 2020 Queensland State League (QSL) for the RedCity Roar.

On 17 July 2020, Froling signed with the Brisbane Bullets for the 2020–21 NBL season. Following the NBL season, he joined the Mackay Meteors of the NBL1 North for the 2021 NBL1 season. Froling made the NBL1 North All-Star Five in the 2021 season, but missed the finals where the Meteors won the NBL1 North championship.

On 23 July 2021, Froling signed with the Illawarra Hawks, teaming up with his brother Sam for the 2021–22 NBL season. On 24 January 2022, he scored a career-high 27 points with eight 3-pointers in a 100–89 win over the 36ers.

Froling joined the Hobart Chargers of the NBL1 South for the 2022 season. He was named to the NBL1 South All-Star Five.

On 28 May 2022, Froling signed with the Brisbane Bullets for the 2022–23 NBL season. On 22 January 2023, he was hospitalised with a serious head injury after getting knocked unconscious during a night out in Wollongong. He discharged himself later that morning before flying back to Brisbane where he was re-admitted to hospital and underwent brain surgery. He was subsequently ruled out for the rest of the season. On 24 January, a 19-year-old man turned himself into police and was charged with reckless grievous bodily harm and affray. On 23 August 2024, the perpetrator was sentenced to two years and seven months in jail.

Froling had been set to join the Ipswich Force for the 2023 NBL1 North season. The Bullets declined the team option on Froling's contract for the 2023–24 season and he subsequently became a free agent. In May 2023, it was revealed that Froling had not been cleared for physical activity and could potentially not play competitive basketball again. In an August 2024 interview, Froling revealed that he continued to experience headaches, insomnia, amnesia and post-traumatic stress disorder because of the assault. He also stated that he wanted to return to playing basketball and was undergoing rehabilitation with the assistance of the Mackay Meteors.

Froling initially signed with the Southern Districts Spartans of the NBL1 North for the 2025 NBL1 season, but on 10 March he signed with the Taranaki Airs for the 2025 New Zealand NBL season. He parted ways with the Airs in mid May to join the Melbourne Tigers of the NBL1 South for the rest of the season. He helped the Tigers reach the NBL1 South Grand Final, where they lost 99–80 to the Sandringham Sabres despite Froling's team-high 21 points.

On 9 July 2025, Froling signed with the Illawarra Hawks for the 2025–26 NBL season as an injury replacement player for his brother Sam, returning to the team for a second stint. Sam returned from injury on Christmas Day, 2025.

Froling joined the Dandenong Rangers for the 2026 NBL1 South season. He was named to the All-NBL1 South First Team.

In August 2026, Froling signed with the Tachikawa Dice of the Japanese B.League.

== National team career ==
Froling played for Australia at the 2013 FIBA Oceania Under-16 Championship, 2014 FIBA Under-17 World Championship, and 2014 FIBA Oceania Under-18 Championship. He debuted for the Boomers in 2017 during the 2019 FIBA World Cup Asian qualifiers.

== Personal life ==
Froling is the son of Shane and Jenny Froling, and has two older twin sisters, Alicia and Keely, and a younger brother Sam.
