= Corey Shervill =

Australian basketball player (born 1998)

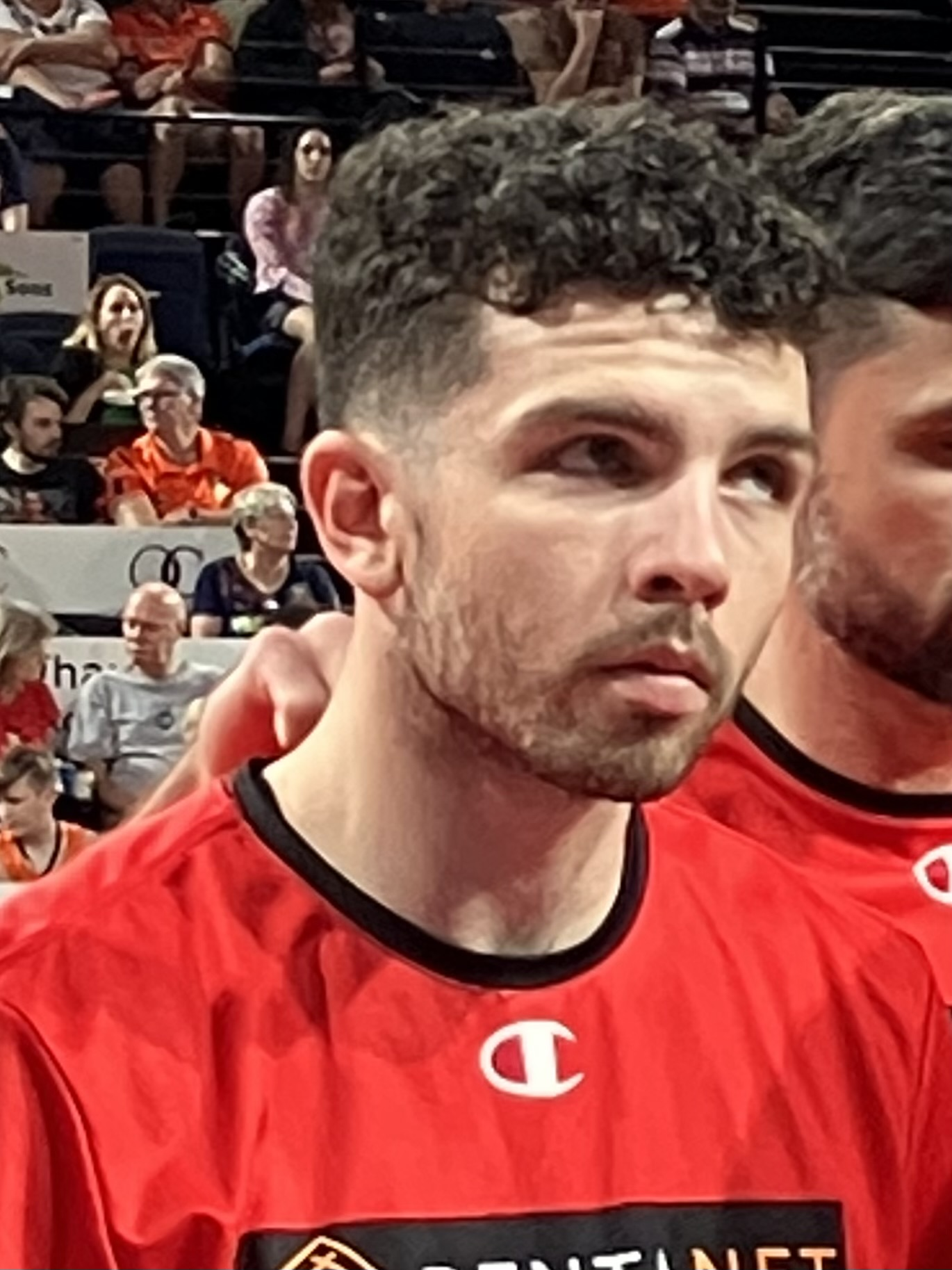
- Shervill with the Perth Wildcats in 2022

No. 9 – Lakeside Lightning
- Position: Forward
- League: NBL1 West

Personal information
- Born: 19 March 1998 (age 27) Perth, Western Australia, Australia
- Listed height: 201 cm (6 ft 7 in)
- Listed weight: 100 kg (220 lb)

Career information
- High school: Aquinas College (Perth, Western Australia)
- College: St. Edward's (2017–2020)
- NBA draft: 2021: undrafted
- Playing career: 2016–present

Career history
- 2016–2018; 2020–2021: Lakeside Lightning
- 2020–2023: Perth Wildcats
- 2023: USC Rip City
- 2024: Southern Districts Spartans
- 2025–present: Lakeside Lightning

Career highlights
- NBL Cup winner (2021); SBL Most Improved Player (2017)

Corey Shervill (born 19 March 1998) is an Australian professional basketball player for the Lakeside Lightning of the NBL1 West. He played three seasons of college basketball in the United States for the St. Edward's Hilltoppers before joining the Perth Wildcats of the National Basketball League (NBL) in 2020, where he spent three seasons. In 2017, he won the SBL Most Improved Player Award while playing for the Lakeside Lightning.

== Early life and career ==
Shervill was born and raised in Perth, Western Australia. He attended Aquinas College, where he earned a bronze medal at the Australian National School Championships. He played basketball as a junior for the Willetton Tigers.

In 2016, Shervill debuted in the State Basketball League (SBL) for the Lakeside Lightning, averaging 5.42 points and 3.85 rebounds in 26 games. In 2017, he averaged 15.65 points, 6.73 rebounds and 1.35 assists in 26 games for the Lightning, subsequently earning SBL Most Improved Player honours. He appeared in eight games for the Lightning in 2018, averaging 12.86 points, 4.0 rebounds and 1.29 assists.

== College career ==
Shervill moved to the United States in 2017 and made his college basketball debut for the St. Edward's Hilltoppers in the NCAA Division II. As a freshman in 2017–18, he averaged 7.4 points and 4.6 rebounds in 28 games.

As a sophomore in 2018–19, Shervill averaged 11.7 points and 4.4 rebounds in 34 games. He scored a career-high 24 points against Paul Quinn College on 31 December 2018.

As a junior in 2019–20, Shervill averaged 11.6 points and 5.1 rebounds in 31 games. He tied his career high of 24 points against Oklahoma Christian University on 2 January 2020. He earned All-LSC Honorable Mention.

== Professional career ==
=== Perth Wildcats (2020–2023) ===
Shervill returned to Perth in 2020 and had a three-game stint with the Lakeside Lightning in the West Coast Classic.

On 24 November 2020, Shervill signed with the Perth Wildcats as a development player for the 2020–21 NBL season. He made his NBL debut in February 2021 and went on to play in 30 games, averaging 2.6 points and 1.4 rebounds per contest and shooting at over 40 per cent from the field. He had a season-high nine points in a win over Melbourne United in his fourth game and entered the Wildcats' starting five for two grand final games. He subsequently joined the Lakeside Lightning for the 2021 NBL1 West season, where he averaged 21.0 points, 4.3 rebounds, 1.9 assists and 1.7 steals in seven games.

On 7 July 2021, Shervill re-signed with the Wildcats on a two-year deal, remaining as a development player for the 2021–22 NBL season. While playing for the Lightning later that month, he suffered a Jones fracture in his foot and immediately had surgery. He was subsequently sidelined until December. He had a screw inserted in his foot and was feeling consistent pain during his return to training, managing just two games before realising that his foot hadn't healed. He was sidelined again in January 2022 and then had a second round of surgery in March.

Shervill re-joined the Wildcats for the 2022–23 NBL season as a fully contracted player, but he struggled for court time. On 2 January 2023, he was released from his contract and demoted to a training player role to make way for the signing of Tai Webster.

=== USC Rip City (2023) ===
On 6 February 2023, Shervill signed with USC Rip City of the NBL1 North for the 2023 season. In 18 games, he averaged 10.06 points, 6.11 rebounds and 2.39 assists per game.

Shervill trained with the Brisbane Bullets during the 2023–24 NBL season.

=== Southern Districts Spartans (2024) ===
On 13 February 2024, Shervill signed with the Southern Districts Spartans for the 2024 NBL1 North season. In 19 games, he averaged 12.11 points, 7.32 rebounds and 1.32 assists per game.

=== Return to Lakeside Lightning (2025–present) ===
In March 2025, Shervill signed with the Lakeside Lightning for the 2025 NBL1 West season. In 22 games, he averaged 18.09 points, 5.82 rebounds, 2.41 assists and 1.27 steals per game.

In December 2025, Shervill re-signed with the Lightning for the 2026 NBL1 West season.
