= Ben Ayre =

Australian basketball player (born 1995)

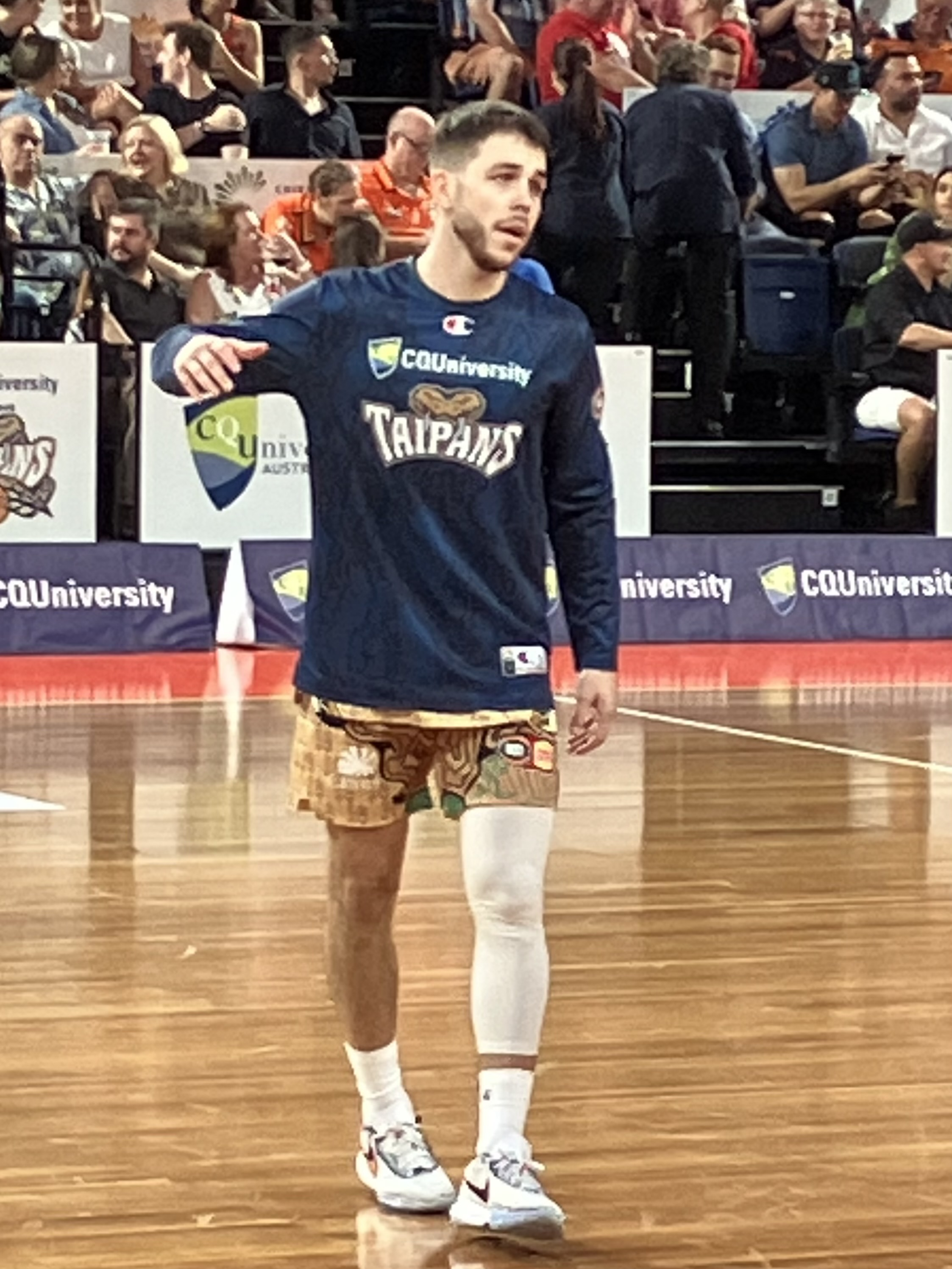
- Ayre with the Cairns Taipans in 2022

No. 10 – Tasmania JackJumpers
- Position: Guard
- League: NBL

Personal information
- Born: 8 December 1995 (age 30) Melbourne, Victoria, Australia
- Listed height: 184 cm (6 ft 0 in)
- Listed weight: 80 kg (176 lb)

Career information
- High school: De La Salle College (Melbourne, Victoria)
- College: Skagit Valley (2015–2017); Newman (2017–2019)
- NBA draft: 2019: undrafted
- Playing career: 2019–present

Career history
- 2019: Nunawading Spectres
- 2019–2020: Adelaide 36ers
- 2020: BC Mažeikiai
- 2021: Knox Raiders
- 2021–2023: Cairns Taipans
- 2022: Cairns Marlins
- 2023: Sandringham Sabres
- 2023–2025: South East Melbourne Phoenix
- 2024: Wellington Saints
- 2025: Baskets Oldenburg
- 2025: Sandringham Sabres
- 2025–present: Tasmania JackJumpers

Career highlights
- 2× NBL1 South champion (2019, 2025); 2× NBL1 South All-Star Five / All First Team (2023, 2025); Second-team All-Heartland Conference (2019); 2× Second-team All-NWAC North Region (2016, 2017)

Benjamin Ayre (born 8 December 1995) is an Australian professional basketball player for the Tasmania JackJumpers of the National Basketball League (NBL). He played college basketball in the United States for Skagit Valley College and Newman University before joining the Adelaide 36ers of the NBL as a development player in 2019. He played briefly in Lithuania for BC Mažeikiai in 2020 and in 2022 had a breakout stint with the Cairns Taipans.

== Early life ==
Ayre was born in Melbourne, Victoria, in the suburb of Clayton. He attended De La Salle College in Melbourne.

== College career ==
Ayre moved to the United States in 2015 to attend Skagit Valley College. He played two seasons of college basketball for the Cardinals, earning second-team All-NWAC North Region in both 2016 and 2017 and averaged 15.2 points, 2.4 rebounds and 3 assists per game.

In 2017, Ayre transferred to Newman University and played the next two seasons for the Jets. He averaged 13.4 points, 2.2 rebounds and 3.9 assists in 27 games in 2017–18, and 12.9 points, 3.1 rebounds and 4.6 assists in 29 games in 2018–19. He was named second-team All-Heartland Conference as a senior.

== Professional career ==
On 21 May 2019, Ayre signed with the Nunawading Spectres of the NBL1 for the rest of the 2019 season. He helped the Spectres reach the grand final, where they won the championship with a 99–90 win over the Bendigo Braves. In 15 games, he averaged 4.8 points, 2.1 rebounds and 2.1 assists per game.

In August 2019, Ayre signed with the Adelaide 36ers of the National Basketball League (NBL) as a development player. He appeared in two games for the 36ers during the 2019–20 NBL season.

On 6 September 2020, Ayre signed with BC Mažeikiai of the Lithuanian Basketball League. Due to family reasons, he left the team and returned to Australia on 22 November 2020. In eight games during the 2020–21 LKL season, he averaged 9.3 points, 2.4 rebounds and 2.6 assists per game.

Ayre joined the Knox Raiders of the NBL1 South for the 2021 season. In 11 games, he averaged 12.0 points, 2.5 rebounds, 3.5 assists and 1.4 steals per game.

For the 2021–22 NBL season, Ayre joined the Cairns Taipans as a training player. He was set to serve as an injury replacement early in the season, but a knee injury suffered at practice sidelined him for two months. He was elevated to the roster for the first time on 1 April 2022. On 18 April 2022, in just his sixth appearance for the Taipans, Ayre scored a team-high 20 points to go with 10 assists, four rebounds, three steals and four 3-pointers in a 92–80 loss to Melbourne United. He became just the third player in 2021–22 to record 20 points and 10 assists in a game alongside Bryce Cotton and Jaylen Adams. In eight games for the Taipans, he averaged 6.63 points, 1.75 rebounds and 3.75 assists per game.

On 23 April 2022, Ayre signed with the Cairns Marlins of the NBL1 North for the 2022 season. In 21 games, he averaged 23.9 points, 3.76 rebounds and 4.05 assists per game.

On 21 July 2022, Ayre signed a two-year deal (second year club option) with the Taipans. He parted ways with the Taipans following the 2022–23 NBL season after the club elected not to take the option on his contract. In 32 games, he averaged 5.8 points, 1.0 rebounds and 1.4 assists per game.

On 14 April 2023, Ayre signed with the Sandringham Sabres for the rest of the 2023 NBL1 South season. He helped the Sabres reach the NBL1 South grand final, where they lost 90–86 to the Knox Raiders despite Ayre's 21 points. He was subsequently named to the NBL1 South All-Star Five. In 19 games, he averaged 24.11 points, 5.26 rebounds, 5.16 assists and 1.11 steals per game.

On 2 May 2023, Ayre signed a two-year deal with the South East Melbourne Phoenix. On 27 January 2024, he recorded 23 points and eight assists in a 103–91 loss to the Perth Wildcats. In 27 games during the 2023–24 NBL season, he averaged 10.7 points and 2.6 assists, while shooting 39.6% from 3-point range.

Ayre joined the Wellington Saints for the 2024 New Zealand NBL season. In 20 games, he averaged 18.9 points and 6.2 assists, while shooting 31.7% from 3-point range.

With the Phoenix in the 2024–25 NBL season, Ayre played 23 games and averaged 4.9 points, 1.2 assists, and 43.1% on 3-pointers.

On 13 March 2025, Ayre signed with Baskets Oldenburg of the German Basketball Bundesliga for the rest of the 2024–25 season. In 13 games, he averaged 3.9 points, 1.2 rebounds and 1.7 assists per game. He then joined the Sandringham Sabres for the 2025 NBL1 South season, where he earned NBL1 South All First Team honours. He helped the Sabres reach the NBL1 South Grand Final, where they defeated the Melbourne Tigers 99–80 to win the championship behind Ayre's 17 points, 11 rebounds, eight assists and two steals.

On 16 April 2025, Ayre signed a two-year deal with the Tasmania JackJumpers. On 2 February 2026, he was ruled out for the rest of the 2025–26 NBL season with a groin injury. He averaged 6.3 points, 2.1 assists and 1.3 rebounds per game.

On 16 April 2026, the JackJumpers activated the option on Ayre's contract for the 2026–27 NBL season. He missed the pre-season Blitz tournament and the start of the regular season due to a hip flexor injury. He made his season debut in early November after recovering from the hip flexor injury.

== National team career ==
In October 2025, Ayre was invited to the Australian Boomers camp ahead of the first window of the FIBA Basketball World Cup 2027 Asian Qualifiers. He was named in the final squad and made his national team the following month.
