= Sam Froling =

Australian basketball player (born 2000)

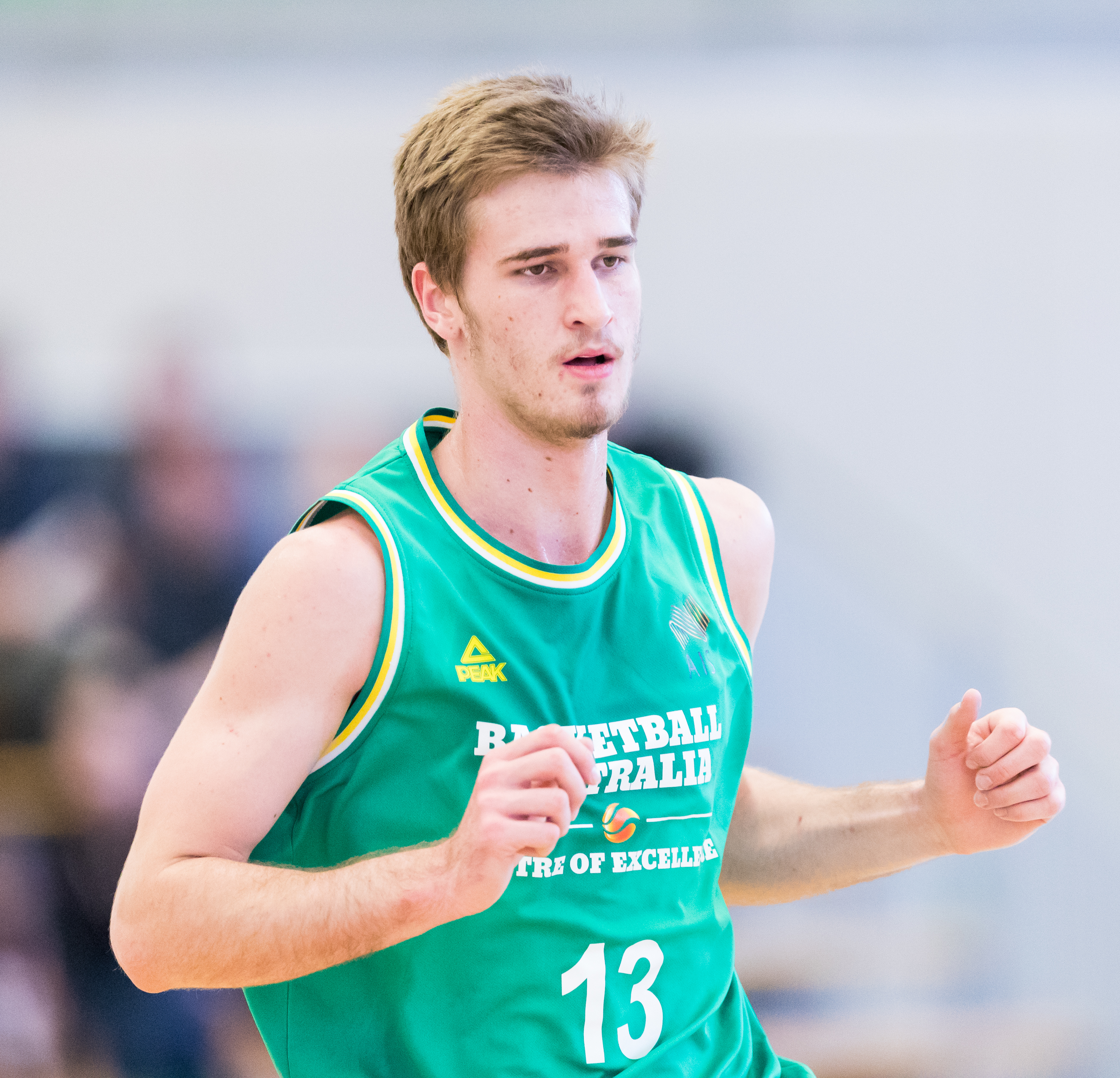
- Froling in 2018

No. 13 – Illawarra Hawks
- Position: Center / power forward
- League: NBL

Personal information
- Born: 10 February 2000 (age 26) Townsville, Queensland, Australia
- Listed height: 213 cm (7 ft 0 in)
- Listed weight: 109 kg (240 lb)

Career information
- College: Creighton (2018–2019)
- NBA draft: 2020: undrafted
- Playing career: 2016–present

Career history
- 2016–2018: BA Centre of Excellence
- 2019: Dandenong Rangers
- 2019–present: Illawarra Hawks
- 2023: Levanga Hokkaido
- 2024: Taranaki Airs

Career highlights
- NBL champion (2025); All-NBL Second Team (2025); NBL Next Generation Award (2024); NBL Most Improved Player (2021)
Medals
Men's basketball
Representing Australia
FIBA Asia Cup
| Gold medal – first place | 2022 Jakarta |

Samson James Froling (born 10 February 2000) is an Australian professional basketball player for the Illawarra Hawks of the National Basketball League (NBL). He played college basketball for the Creighton Bluejays for one season before leaving to play professionally in Australia.

== Early life and career ==
Froling was born in Townsville, Queensland, in the suburb of Hyde Park. Between 2016 and 2018, he played for the BA Centre of Excellence in the South East Australian Basketball League (SEABL).

== College career ==
In January 2018, Froling committed to play college basketball for the Creighton Bluejays after receiving offers from programs including Wichita State, Arizona and Maryland. In 30 games for Creighton during the 2018–19 season, Froling averaged 3.6 points and 1.9 rebounds in 8.9 minutes a game. On 1 April 2019, Froling announced he would be leaving Creighton to pursue professional opportunities in Australia.

== Professional career ==
On the same day as announcing he had left Creighton, Froling was listed on the roster for the Dandenong Rangers of the Australian semi-professional league NBL1. In 16 games for the Rangers during the league's inaugural 2019 season, Froling averaged 16.9 points and 7.6 rebounds a game.

On 6 May 2019, Froling signed a three-year deal with the Illawarra Hawks of the NBL. His remaining contract with Illawarra was voided when the club was liquidated on 18 May 2020.

On 22 July 2020, Froling re-signed with the Hawks on a new two-year deal. He re-signed to a new three-year deal on 25 February 2022.

On 22 February 2023, Froling signed with the Levanga Hokkaido of the Japanese B.League.

With the Hawks in the 2023–24 NBL season, Froling won the NBL Next Generation Award.

Froling joined the Taranaki Airs of the New Zealand National Basketball League (NZNBL) for the 2024 season. In July 2024, he joined the Indiana Pacers for the NBA Summer League.

With the Hawks in the 2024–25 NBL season, Froling helped the team finish on top of the regular-season ladder and earned All-NBL Second Team honours. In the NBL Grand Final series against Melbourne United, Froling suffered an Achilles injury in the second quarter of a game four victory. He was subsequently ruled out until 2026.

On 29 April 2025, Froling re-signed with the Hawks on a three-year deal. He will make his return from injury on Christmas Day, 2025.

== National team career ==
Froling played for the Australian national junior program between 2015 and 2019. He debuted for the Australian Boomers during the FIBA Asia Cup qualifiers in 2020. He played for the Boomers in the FIBA World Cup qualifiers in 2021 and at the 2022 FIBA Asia Cup.

In November 2024, Froling joined the Boomers for the 2025 FIBA Asia Cup qualifiers.

In February 2026, Froling was named in the Boomers squad for two FIBA World Cup Asian qualifiers. In August 2026, he was named in the squad for two more Asian qualifiers. In November 2026, he was named in the squad for two more Asian qualifiers.

== Career statistics ==
Legend
| GP | Games played | GS | Games started | MPG | Minutes per game |
| FG% | Field goal percentage | 3P% | 3-point field goal percentage | FT% | Free throw percentage |
| RPG | Rebounds per game | APG | Assists per game | SPG | Steals per game |
| BPG | Blocks per game | PPG | Points per game | **Bold** | Career high |

=== College ===
| Year | Team | GP | GS | MPG | FG% | 3P% | FT% | RPG | APG | SPG | BPG | PPG |
|---|---|---|---|---|---|---|---|---|---|---|---|---|
| 2018–19 | Creighton | 30 | 0 | 9.2 | .576 | .250 | .385 | 1.9 | .5 | .1 | .4 | 3.6 |

== Personal life ==
Froling is the son of Shane and Jenny Froling and is the youngest of four siblings. His father played in the NBL for twenty years, while his mother was a four-time champion in the Women's National Basketball League (WNBL). His sisters, Alicia and Keely, have played together in the WNBL, while his brother, Harry Froling, plays in the NBL for the Brisbane Bullets.
