= 2022 WNBL Finals =

Women's National Basketball League Finals

Team	Coach	Wins
Melbourne Boomers	Guy Molloy	2
Perth Lynx	Ryan Petrik	1
- Dates: 24 March – 9 April 2022
- MVP: Lindsay Allen (MEL)
- Semifinalists: Melbourne def. Adelaide, 2–0; Perth def. Canberra, 1–0

The 2022 WNBL Finals was the postseason tournament of the WNBL's 2021–22 season. The Southside Flyers were the defending champions, however they failed to qualify for the finals series. The WNBL Finals schedule was announced 10 March 2022. The Melbourne Boomers won their second championship, defeating Perth in the Grand Final series, 2–1.

== Standings ==
#	WNBL Championship ladder				
#	Team	W	L	PCT	GP
1	Melbourne Boomers	12	5	70.5	17
2	Perth Lynx	11	5	68.7	16
3	Canberra Capitals	11	6	64.7	17
4	Adelaide Lightning	10	7	58.8	17
5	Bendigo Spirit	7	9	43.7	16
6	Townsville Fire	7	10	41.1	17
7	Southside Flyers	5	12	29.4	17
8	Sydney Uni Flames	4	13	23.5	17

== Bracket ==
Semi Finals
1	Melbourne Boomers	2
4	Adelaide Lightning	0
3	Canberra Capitals	0
2	Perth Lynx	1

Grand Final
1	Melbourne Boomers	2
2	Perth Lynx	1

== Semi-finals ==
=== (1) Melbourne Boomers vs. (4) Adelaide Lightning ===
24 March 2022
7:00 PM (AEDT)

Box Score

Melbourne Boomers	95–64	Adelaide Lightning
Scoring by quarter: 13–26, 19–21, 30–12, 33–5
Pts: Allen 24; Rebs: George 8 Asts: George 8		Pts: Smith 17; Rebs: Talbot 10; Asts: Talbot 6

Melbourne Sports Centre Parkville, Melbourne, Victoria
Attendance: 1,423
Referees: Madison Crowley-Long, Calia Hanks, Jack Taylor

26 March 2022
4:30 PM (ACDT)

Box Score

Adelaide Lightning	49–61	Melbourne Boomers
Scoring by quarter: 16–12, 9–17, 14–14, 10–18
Pts: Smith 24; Rebs: Talbot 12; Asts: Talbot 8		Pts: Allen 15; Rebs: Magbegor 12; Asts: Madgen 4
Melbourne win series, 2–0

The Lights Community and Sports Centre, Adelaide, South Australia
Attendance: 505
Referees: Haylee Cole, Byron Geddes, Guy Richards

=== (2) Perth Lynx vs. (3) Canberra Capitals ===
24 March 2022
6:30 PM (AWST)

Box Score

Perth Lynx	91–77	Canberra Capitals
Scoring by quarter: 23–23, 29–18, 18–16, 21–20
Pts: Whitcomb 20; Rebs: Whitcomb 11; Asts: Young 5		Pts: Smart 18; Rebs: Griffin 11; Asts: Wilson 6
Perth win series, 1–0^{[a]}

Bendat Basketball Centre, Perth, Western Australia
Attendance: 879
Referees: Craig Copes, Elliot Green, Daniel Troy

Notes

- ^{a} Perth-Canberra semi-final was not able to be played as a best-of-three series due to a COVID-19 outbreak in the Canberra team. After Game 2 in Canberra was cancelled, it was initially postponed to a best-of-two series determined by points spread. However the rescheduled Game 2 in Perth was also cancelled after Canberra were unable to field a team. Perth advanced to the Grand Final with a 1–0 series win.

== Grand Final ==
=== (1) Melbourne Boomers vs. (2) Perth Lynx ===
2 April 2022
5:00 PM (AEDT)

Box Score

Melbourne Boomers	71–98	Perth Lynx
Scoring by quarter: 18–27, 14–33, 18–16, 21–22
Pts: Mitchell 17; Rebs: Madgen 8 Asts: Madgen 5		Pts: Garbin 25; Rebs: Scherf 12; Asts: Whitcomb 6

Melbourne Sports Centre Parkville, Melbourne, Victoria
Attendance: 1,206
Referees: Haylee Cole, Madison Crowley-Long, Tayla Flint

6 April 2022
7:00 PM (AWST)

Box Score

Perth Lynx	75–76	Melbourne Boomers
Scoring by quarter: 28–25, 11–17, 17–17, 19–17
Pts: Mabrey 30; Rebs: Sharp 12; Asts: Young 3		Pts: Allen 29; Rebs: George 12; Asts: Madgen 7

Bendat Basketball Centre, Perth, Western Australia
Attendance: 1,500
Referees: Guy Richards, Travis Stewart, Jack Taylor

9 April 2022
5:00 PM (AEST)

Box Score

Melbourne Boomers	84–66	Perth Lynx
Scoring by quarter: 21–16, 28–17, 20–9, 15–24
Pts: George, Magbegor 17; Rebs: George 12; Asts: Allen 7		Pts: Young 18; Rebs: Whitcomb 6 Asts: Garbin 4

Melbourne Sports Centre Parkville, Melbourne, Victoria
Attendance: 2,523
Referees: Daniel Battye, Elliot Green, James Griguol

=== Rosters ===
2021–22 Melbourne Boomers roster
Players
Coaches

Pos.	No.	Nat.	Name	Ht.
G	6	(Australia)	Brewster, Rachel	1.80 m (5 ft 11 in)
F	7	(Australia)	Brown, Lou	1.87 m (6 ft 2 in)
G	8	(Australia)	Scanlon, Lily	1.75 m (5 ft 9 in)
G	9	(Australia)	Madgen, Tess	1.83 m (6 ft 0 in)
G	10	(Australia)	Wright, Izzy	1.80 m (5 ft 11 in)
F	11	(Australia)	Ernst, Carley	1.96 m (6 ft 5 in)
F	12	(New Zealand)	Davidson, Penina	1.90 m (6 ft 3 in)
F	13	(Australia)	Magbegor, Ezi	1.93 m (6 ft 4 in)
G	15	(United States)	Allen, Lindsay	1.73 m (5 ft 8 in)
F/C	22	(Australia)	George, Cayla (C)	1.92 m (6 ft 4 in)
G	25	(United States)	Mitchell, Tiffany	1.75 m (5 ft 9 in)

Head coach

- (Australia) Guy Molloy

Assistant coach(es)

- (Australia) Larissa Anderson
- (Australia) Paul Flynn

Legend

- (C) Team captain
- (DP) Development player
- (I) Import player
- Injured

- Roster
Updated: 7 April 2022

2021–22 Perth Lynx roster
Players
Coaches

Pos.	No.	Nat.	Name	Ht.
G	0	(United States)	Young, Jackie	1.83 m (6 ft 0 in)
G	3	(United States)	Mabrey, Marina	1.80 m (5 ft 11 in)
F/C	5	(Australia)	Garbin, Darcee (C)	1.88 m (6 ft 2 in)
F	7	(Australia)	Clarke, Emma	1.85 m (6 ft 1 in)
G/F	8	(Australia)	Ciabattoni, Alex	1.83 m (6 ft 0 in)
G	9	(Australia)	Sharp, Alexandra	1.85 m (6 ft 1 in)
C	11	(Australia)	Scherf, Lauren	1.96 m (6 ft 5 in)
F/C	12	(Australia)	Clinch Hoycard, Mackenzie	1.90 m (6 ft 3 in)
F/C	20	(Australia)	Isenbarger, Ashleigh	1.87 m (6 ft 2 in)
G	22	(Australia)	Burrows, Tayah	1.79 m (5 ft 10 in)
G	31	(Australia)	Gandini, Emma	1.72 m (5 ft 8 in)
G	32	(Australia)	Whitcomb, Sami	1.78 m (5 ft 10 in)

Head coach

- (Australia) Ryan Petrik

Assistant coach(es)

- (Australia) Natalie Burton
- (Australia) Brad Robbins

Legend

- (C) Team captain
- (DP) Development player
- (I) Import player
- Injured

- Roster
Updated: 7 April 2022
