= 2021–22 Melbourne Boomers season =

Women's National Basketball season

- Head Coach: Guy Molloy
- Captain: Cayla George
- Venue: Melbourne Sports; Centre Parkville

Results
- Record: 12–5
- Ladder: 1st
- Finals: TBD

Leaders

The 2021–22 Melbourne Boomers season is the 39th season for the franchise in the Women's National Basketball League (WNBL).

== Roster ==
2021–22 Melbourne Boomers roster
Players
Coaches

Pos.	No.	Nat.	Name	Ht.
F	11	(Australia)	Ernst, Carley	1.96 m (6 ft 5 in)
G	6	(Australia)	Brewster, Rachel	1.80 m (5 ft 11 in)
F	7	(Australia)	Brown, Lou	1.87 m (6 ft 2 in)
G	8	(Australia)	Scanlon, Lily	1.75 m (5 ft 9 in)
G	9	(Australia)	Madgen, Tess	1.83 m (6 ft 0 in)
G	10	(Australia)	Wright, Izzy	1.80 m (5 ft 11 in)
F	12	(New Zealand)	Davidson, Penina	1.90 m (6 ft 3 in)
F	13	(Australia)	Magbegor, Ezi	1.93 m (6 ft 4 in)
G	15	(United States)	Allen, Lindsay	1.73 m (5 ft 8 in)
F/C	22	(Australia)	George, Cayla (C)	1.92 m (6 ft 4 in)
G	25	(United States)	Mitchell, Tiffany	1.75 m (5 ft 9 in)
G	17	(Australia)	Dunn, Charlise (DP)	1.84 m (6 ft 0 in)
G	1	(Australia)	Trotto, Jacqui (DP)	1.80 m (5 ft 11 in)
F	5	(Australia)	Burrows, Sophie (DP)	1.84 m (6 ft 0 in)
G	34	(Australia)	Heal, Tess (DP)	1.77 m (5 ft 10 in)
G	3	(Australia)	Niven-Brown, Bella (DP)	1.78 m (5 ft 10 in)
G	2	(New Zealand)	Hippolite, Lauryn (I)	1.74 m (5 ft 9 in)

Head coach

- (Australia) Guy Molloy

Assistant coach(es)

- (Australia) Larissa Anderson
- (Australia) Paul Flynn

Legend

- (C) Team captain
- (DP) Development player
- (I) Import player
- Injured

- Roster
Updated: 29 July 2022

== Standings ==
#	WNBL Championship ladder				
#	Team	W	L	PCT	GP
1	Melbourne Boomers	12	5	70.5	17
2	Perth Lynx	11	5	68.7	16
3	Canberra Capitals	11	6	64.7	17
4	Adelaide Lightning	10	7	58.8	17
5	Bendigo Spirit	7	9	43.7	16
6	Townsville Fire	7	10	41.1	17
7	Southside Flyers	5	12	29.4	17
8	Sydney Uni Flames	4	13	23.5	17

== Results ==
=== Regular season ===
Game	Date	Team	Score	High points	High rebounds	High assists	Location	Record
1	December; 8	@ Bendigo	58–63	George (16)	George (19)	Allen, Madgen, Mitchell (3)	Bendigo Stadium	0–1
2	December; 11	Southside	91–72	Allen, Mitchell (22)	George, Mitchell (9)	George (6)	Melbourne Sports Centre Parkville	1–1
3	December; 18	@ Southside	87–72	George (25)	George (12)	Madgen (5)	Dandenong Stadium	2–1
4	December; 19	@ Bendigo	81–56	Mitchell (25)	Magbegor (16)	Magbegor (9)	Bendigo Stadium	3–1
5	December; 22	@ Sydney	83–77	Magbegor (20)	Madgen (10)	George (6)	Qudos Bank Arena	4–1
6	December; 30	@ Adelaide	53–65	Magbegor (15)	George (10)	George (7)	The Lights Community and Sports Centre	4–2
7	January; 15	Southside	75–72	Mitchell (17)	George (11)	Mitchell (8)	Melbourne Sports Centre Parkville	5–2
8	January; 17	@ Perth	80–77	Mitchell (22)	George (12)	Allen, Magbegor (4)	Selkirk Stadium	6–2
9	January; 22	Townsville	66–68	George (24)	George (14)	Allen (7)	Melbourne Sports Centre Parkville	6–3
10	January; 30	@ Townsville	66–59	Magbegor (20)	George (11)	Mitchell (4)	Townsville Entertainment Centre	7–3
11	February; 6	Perth	71–76 (OT)	Allen (17)	Wright (9)	Wright (4)	Gippsland Regional Indoor Sports Stadium	7–4
12	February; 20	Sydney	85–76	Mitchell (21)	George (10)	Allen (4)	State Basketball Centre	8–4
13	February; 25	Townsville	88–60	Madgen (23)	George (10)	Davidson, Madgen (4)	State Basketball Centre	9–4
14	February; 27	@ Canberra	78–76	Allen (29)	George (16)	Allen (8)	National Convention Centre	10–4
15	March; 6	Bendigo	65–68	Allen (17)	Mitchell (10)	Mitchell (4)	Melbourne Sports Centre Parkville	10–5
16	March; 13	@ Adelaide	72–49	Magbegor (23)	George, Magbegor (13)	George, Mitchell (3)	The Lights Community and Sports Centre	11–5
17	March; 19	Canberra	107–52	George (23)	George, Magbegor (8)	Allen (6)	Melbourne Sports Centre Parkville	12–5

=== Finals ===
==== Semi-finals ====
Game	Date	Team	Score	High points	High rebounds	High assists	Location	Series
1	March; 24	Adelaide	95–64	Allen (24)	George (8)	George (8)	Melbourne Sports Centre Parkville	1–0
2	March; 26	@ Adelaide	61–49	Allen (15)	Magbegor (12)	Madgen (4)	The Lights Community and Sports Centre	2–0

==== Grand Final ====
Game	Date	Team	Score	High points	High rebounds	High assists	Location	Series
1	April; 2	Perth	71-98				Melbourne Sports Centre Parkville	0-1
2	April; 6	@ Perth	75-76				TBD	1-1
3	April; 9	Perth	84-66				Melbourne Sports Centre Parkville	2-1
