= 2021–22 Adelaide Lightning season =

Women's National Basketball season

- Head Coach: Chris Lucas
- Captain: Stephanie Talbot
- Venue: The Lights Community and Sports Centre

Results
- Record: 10–7
- Ladder: 4th
- Finals: Semi-finals (defeated by Melbourne, 0–2)

Leaders

The 2021–22 Adelaide Lightning season is the 30th season for the franchise in the Women's National Basketball League (WNBL).

== Roster ==
2021–22 Adelaide Lightning roster
Players
Coaches

Pos.	No.	Nat.	Name	Ht.
G	3	(Australia)	Basham, Brooke	1.78 m (5 ft 10 in)
G/F	7	(Australia)	Talbot, Stephanie (C)	1.88 m (6 ft 2 in)
F/C	8	(Australia)	Brook, Chelsea	1.88 m (6 ft 2 in)
G	10	(Australia)	Ortlepp, Taylor	1.78 m (5 ft 10 in)
F	11	(Australia)	Smith, Alanna	1.91 m (6 ft 3 in)
G/F	12	(Australia)	Simons, Sam	1.88 m (6 ft 2 in)
G	13	(Australia)	Wehrung, Abigail	1.78 m (5 ft 10 in)
F/C	20	(Australia)	Batish, Ella	1.88 m (6 ft 2 in)
G/F	21	(Australia)	Whittle, Marena	1.80 m (5 ft 11 in)
G	23	(United States)	Williams, Kiana	1.73 m (5 ft 8 in)
C	24	(United States)	Shook, Kylee	1.96 m (6 ft 5 in)
G/F	41	(Australia)	Brazel, Tayla	1.82 m (6 ft 0 in)

Head coach

- (Australia) Chris Lucas

Assistant coach(es)

- (Australia) Natalie Hurst

Legend

- (C) Team captain
- (DP) Development player
- (I) Import player
- Injured

- Roster
Updated: 20 March 2022

== Standings ==
#	WNBL Championship ladder				
#	Team	W	L	PCT	GP
1	Melbourne Boomers	12	5	70.5	17
2	Perth Lynx	11	5	68.7	16
3	Canberra Capitals	11	6	64.7	17
4	Adelaide Lightning	10	7	58.8	17
5	Bendigo Spirit	7	9	43.7	16
6	Townsville Fire	7	10	41.1	17
7	Southside Flyers	5	12	29.4	17
8	Sydney Uni Flames	4	13	23.5	17

== Results ==
=== Regular season ===
Game	Date	Team	Score	High points	High rebounds	High assists	Location	Record
1	December; 11	Townsville	59–70	Talbot (19)	Shook (14)	Shook, Talbot (4)	The Lights Community and Sports Centre	0–1
2	December; 19	@ Canberra	88–62	Whittle, Williams (17)	Talbot (12)	Talbot (6)	National Convention Centre	1–1
3	December; 30	Melbourne	65–53	Smith (21)	Talbot (12)	Talbot (4)	The Lights Community and Sports Centre	2–1
4	January; 2	Perth	88–86	Smith (25)	Smith, Talbot (11)	Smith (8)	The Lights Community and Sports Centre	3–1
5	January; 20	@ Sydney	77–52	Talbot (19)	Talbot (9)	Talbot (7)	Brydens Stadium	4–1
6	January; 28	@ Townsville	73–65 (OT)	Smith (21)	Smith (11)	Talbot (6)	Townsville Entertainment Centre	5–1
7	January; 30	Canberra	67–80	Ortlepp, Smith (12)	Smith (8)	Talbot (8)	The Lights Community and Sports Centre	5–2
8	February; 5	Bendigo	62–74	Brook (16)	Shook (8)	Wehrung (5)	The Lights Community and Sports Centre	5–3
9	February; 19	@ Southside	85–72	Smith (23)	Talbot (11)	Talbot (8)	Dandenong Stadium	6–3
10	February; 24	@ Bendigo	84–77	Talbot (18)	Shook, Talbot (11)	Williams (6)	Bendigo Stadium	7–3
11	February; 26	@ Sydney	73–56	Shook (20)	Shook (9)	Talbot (12)	Hills Basketball Stadium	8–3
12	March; 5	Townsville	78–57	Smith (26)	Smith (11)	Talbot (6)	The Lights Community and Sports Centre	9–3
13	March; 7	@ Perth	79–104	Smith, Williams (17)	Smith (8)	Talbot (5)	Bendat Basketball Centre	9–4
14	March; 9	@ Perth	73–84	Smith (24)	Smith (17)	Talbot, Williams (7)	Bendat Basketball Centre	9–5
15	March; 13	Melbourne	49–72	Williams (12)	Smith (9)	Talbot (3)	The Lights Community and Sports Centre	9–6
16	March; 17	Canberra	81–50	Smith (19)	Shook (11)	Talbot (5)	The Lights Community and Sports Centre	10–6
17	March; 19	Southside	79–87	Smith (28)	Smith (10)	Talbot (8)	The Lights Community and Sports Centre	10–7

=== Finals ===
==== Semi-finals ====
Game	Date	Team	Score	High points	High rebounds	High assists	Location	Series
1	March; 24	@ Melbourne	64–95	Smith (17)	Talbot (10)	Talbot (6)	Melbourne Sports Centre Parkville	0–1
2	March; 26	Melbourne	49–61	Smith (24)	Talbot (12)	Talbot (8)	The Lights Community and Sports Centre	0–2
