= 2021–22 WNBL season =

- League: Women's National Basketball League
- Sport: Basketball
- Duration: 2 December 2021 – 9 April 2022
- Teams: 8
- TV partner(s): ABC; Fox Sports; Kayo

Regular season
- Top seed: Melbourne Boomers
- Season MVP: Anneli Maley (BEN)
- Top scorer: Anneli Maley (BEN)

Finals
- Champions: Melbourne Boomers
- Runners-up: Perth Lynx
- Finals MVP: Lindsay Allen (MEL)

WNBL seasons
- ← 2020 2022–23 →

The 2021–22 WNBL season was the 42nd season of the competition since its establishment in 1981. The Southside Flyers were the defending champions, however they failed to qualify for finals. The Melbourne Boomers won their second championship, defeating Perth in the Grand Final series, 2–1.

After the 2020 season was condensed due to the COVID-19 pandemic, it was confirmed in July 2021 that the upcoming season is set to be closer to the traditional season fixture played over several months across the summer. In October 2021, a new broadcast deal was signed with the ABC, Fox Sports and Kayo, with an 84-game season fixture announced shortly after.

Spalding will again provide equipment including the official game ball, alongside iAthletic supplying team apparel for the fifth consecutive season.

== Standings ==
#	WNBL Championship ladder				
#	Team	W	L	PCT	GP
1	Melbourne Boomers	12	5	70.5	17
2	Perth Lynx	11	5	68.7	16
3	Canberra Capitals	11	6	64.7	17
4	Adelaide Lightning	10	7	58.8	17
5	Bendigo Spirit	7	9	43.7	16
6	Townsville Fire	7	10	41.1	17
7	Southside Flyers	5	12	29.4	17
8	Sydney Uni Flames	4	13	23.5	17

== Finals ==
Semi Finals
1	Melbourne Boomers	2
4	Adelaide Lightning	0
3	Canberra Capitals	0
2	Perth Lynx	1

Grand Final
1	Melbourne Boomers	2
2	Perth Lynx	1

== Statistics ==
=== Individual statistic leaders ===
Category	Player	Statistic
Points per game	Anneli Maley (BEN)	19.8 PPG
Rebounds per game	Anneli Maley (BEN)	15.7 RPG
Assists per game	Stephanie Talbot (ADL)	6.4 APG
Steals per game	Kalani Purcell (SYD)	2.8 SPG
Blocks per game	Ezi Magbegor (MEL)	1.6 BPG

=== Individual game highs ===
Category	Player	Statistic
Points	Anneli Maley (BEN)	38
Rebounds	Anneli Maley (BEN)	24
Assists	Stephanie Talbot (ADL)	12
Steals	Kalani Purcell (SYD)	7
Blocks	Abby Bishop (STH); Ezi Magbegor (MEL)	4

== Awards ==
=== Player of the Week ===
Round #	Player	Ref.
Round 1	Brittney Sykes (CBR)	
Round 2	Lauren Nicholson (TSV)	
Round 3	Ezi Magbegor (MEL)	
Round 4	Anneli Maley (BEN)	
Round 5	Alanna Smith (ADL)	
Round 6		
Round 7	Marina Mabrey (PER)	
Round 8	Lauren Nicholson (TSV) (2)	
Round 9	Mikaela Ruef (CBR)	
Round 10	Anneli Maley (BEN) (2)	
Round 11	Alanna Smith (ADL) (2)	
Round 12	Anneli Maley (BEN) (3)	
Round 13	Keely Froling (SYD)	
Round 14	Jackie Young (PER)	
Round 15	Cayla George (MEL)	

=== Postseason Awards ===
Award	Winner	Position	Team
Most Valuable Player	Anneli Maley	Forward	Bendigo Spirit
Grand Final MVP	Lindsay Allen	Guard	Melbourne Boomers
Defensive Player of the Year	Brittney Sykes	Guard	Canberra Capitals
Sixth Woman of the Year	Kristy Wallace	Guard	Southside Flyers
Youth Player of the Year	Ezi Magbegor	Forward	Melbourne Boomers
Coach of the Year	Ryan Petrik	Coach	Perth Lynx
Leading Scorer Award	Anneli Maley	Forward	Bendigo Spirit
Leading Rebounder Award	Anneli Maley	Forward	Bendigo Spirit
Golden Hands Award	Brittney Sykes	Guard	Canberra Capitals
All-WNBL First Team	Jackie Young	Guard	Perth Lynx
All-WNBL First Team	Brittney Sykes	Guard	Canberra Capitals
All-WNBL First Team	Stephanie Talbot	Guard	Adelaide Lightning
All-WNBL First Team	Anneli Maley	Forward	Bendigo Spirit
All-WNBL First Team	Ezi Magbegor	Forward/Center	Melbourne Boomers
All-WNBL Second Team	Lindsay Allen	Guard	Melbourne Boomers
All-WNBL Second Team	Marina Mabrey	Guard	Perth Lynx
All-WNBL Second Team	Kelsey Griffin	Forward	Canberra Capitals
All-WNBL Second Team	Alanna Smith	Forward	Adelaide Lightning
All-WNBL Second Team	Cayla George	Forward/Center	Melbourne Boomers

== Team captains and coaches ==
Team	Captain	Coach
Adelaide Lightning	Stephanie Talbot	Chris Lucas
Bendigo Spirit	Madeleine Garrick / Tessa Lavey (co)	Tracy York
Canberra Capitals	Kelsey Griffin	Paul Goriss
Melbourne Boomers	Cayla George	Guy Molloy
Perth Lynx	Darcee Garbin	Ryan Petrik
Southside Flyers	Jenna O'Hea	Cheryl Chambers
Sydney Uni Flames	Keely Froling / Lauren Mansfield (co)	Shane Heal
Townsville Fire	Mia Murray / Lauren Nicholson (co)	Shannon Seebohm
