= 2021–22 Perth Lynx season =

Women's National Basketball season

- Head Coach: Ryan Petrik
- Captain: Darcee Garbin
- Venue: Bendat Basketball Centre

Results
- Record: 11–5
- Ladder: 2nd
- Finals: TBD

Leaders

The 2021–22 Perth Lynx season is the 21st season for the franchise in the Women's National Basketball League (WNBL).

== Roster ==
2021–22 Perth Lynx roster
Players
Coaches

Pos.	No.	Nat.	Name	Ht.
G	0	(United States)	Young, Jackie	1.83 m (6 ft 0 in)
G	3	(United States)	Mabrey, Marina	1.80 m (5 ft 11 in)
F/C	5	(Australia)	Garbin, Darcee (C)	1.88 m (6 ft 2 in)
F	7	(Australia)	Clarke, Emma	1.85 m (6 ft 1 in)
G/F	8	(Australia)	Ciabattoni, Alex	1.83 m (6 ft 0 in)
G	9	(Australia)	Sharp, Alexandra	1.85 m (6 ft 1 in)
C	11	(Australia)	Scherf, Lauren	1.96 m (6 ft 5 in)
F/C	12	(Australia)	Clinch Hoycard, Mackenzie	1.90 m (6 ft 3 in)
F/C	20	(Australia)	Isenbarger, Ashleigh	1.87 m (6 ft 2 in)
G	22	(Australia)	Burrows, Tayah	1.79 m (5 ft 10 in)
G	31	(Australia)	Gandini, Emma	1.72 m (5 ft 8 in)
G	32	(Australia)	Whitcomb, Sami	1.78 m (5 ft 10 in)

Head coach

- (Australia) Ryan Petrik

Assistant coach(es)

- (Australia) Natalie Burton
- (Australia) Brad Robbins

Legend

- (C) Team captain
- (DP) Development player
- (I) Import player
- Injured

- Roster
Updated: 21 March 2022

== Standings ==
#	WNBL Championship ladder				
#	Team	W	L	PCT	GP
1	Melbourne Boomers	12	5	70.5	17
2	Perth Lynx	11	5	68.7	16
3	Canberra Capitals	11	6	64.7	17
4	Adelaide Lightning	10	7	58.8	17
5	Bendigo Spirit	7	9	43.7	16
6	Townsville Fire	7	10	41.1	17
7	Southside Flyers	5	12	29.4	17
8	Sydney Uni Flames	4	13	23.5	17

== Results ==
=== Regular season ===
Game	Date	Team	Score	High points	High rebounds	High assists	Location	Record
1	January; 2	@ Adelaide	86–88	Mabrey (30)	Scherf (9)	Whitcomb (7)	The Lights Community and Sports Centre	0–1
2	January; 12	@ Southside	83–79 (OT)	Mabrey, Scherf (23)	Scherf (10)	Mabrey (5)	Selkirk Stadium	1–1
3	January; 14	@ Canberra	88–69	Mabrey (27)	Scherf (12)	Mabrey (4)	National Convention Centre	2–1
4	January; 16	Melbourne	77–80	Garbin, Scherf (18)	Whitcomb (9)	Ciabattoni (5)	Selkirk Stadium	2–2
5	January; 19	Canberra	102–73	Garbin (24)	Scherf (14)	Young (8)	Selkirk Stadium	3–2
6	January; 23	@ Sydney	86–81	Mabrey (34)	Scherf (9)	Mabrey (5)	Qudos Bank Arena	4–2
7	January; 27	@ Southside	85–78	Mabrey (22)	Scherf (11)	Mabrey (6)	Dandenong Stadium	5–2
8	January; 29	Bendigo	90–82	Young (24)	Scherf (16)	Ciabattoni, Whitcomb (4)	Selkirk Stadium	6–2
9	February; 6	@ Melbourne	76–71 (OT)	Young (26)	Scherf (18)	Young (6)	Gippsland Regional Indoor Sports Stadium	7–2
10	March; 5	Sydney	63–66	Young (28)	Garbin (10)	Whitcomb (4)	Bendat Basketball Centre	7–3
11	March; 7	Adelaide	104–79	Young (30)	Young (7)	Ciabattoni (6)	Bendat Basketball Centre	8–3
12	March; 9	Adelaide	84–73	Whitcomb (18)	Garbin (9)	Ciabattoni (7)	Bendat Basketball Centre	9–3
13	March; 12	Canberra	80–96	Young (36)	Scherf (10)	Whitcomb (4)	Bendat Basketball Centre	9–4
14	March; 16	@ Sydney	84–72	Whitcomb (23)	Scherf (11)	Whitcomb (5)	Brydens Stadium	10–4
15	March; 18	@ Townsville	75–68	Mabrey (20)	Scherf (11)	Whitcomb, Young (5)	Townsville Entertainment Centre	11–4
16	March; 20	@ Townsville	69–76	Young (26)	Scherf (9)	Mabrey, Young (2)	Townsville Entertainment Centre	11–5

=== Finals ===
==== Semi-finals ====
Game	Date	Team	Score	High points	High rebounds	High assists	Location	Series
1	March; 24	Canberra					Bendat Basketball Centre	
2	March; 27	@ Canberra					Southern Cross Stadium	
3	March; 31	Canberra					Bendat Basketball Centre	
