= 2019 WNBA draft =

General information
- Sport: Basketball
- Date: April 10, 2019
- Location: Nike NYHQ, New York City
- Networks: ESPN2 (first round); ESPNU (second and third rounds)

Overview
- League: WNBA
- Teams: 12
- First selection: Jackie Young; Las Vegas Aces

The 2019 WNBA draft was the league's draft for the 2019 WNBA season. On March 19, the league announced the draft would be held on April 10 at Nike New York headquarters. The first round was televised on ESPN2, and the second and third rounds were televised on ESPNU.

On August 28, 2018, the league held the draft lottery between the four non-playoff teams – Indiana, New York, Las Vegas, and Chicago. The Aces won the top pick for the third year in a row. For just the second time, all five players of one school's starting lineup was drafted, when Notre Dame's starting five were selected in the first 20 picks.

== Draft lottery ==
The lottery selection to determine the order of the top four picks in the 2019 draft took place on August 28, 2018 during halftime of the 2018 WNBA Playoffs game between the Atlanta Dream and Washington Mystics.

=== Lottery chances ===
All odds out of 1,000 based on percentages. (The 11-12-13-14 combination is ignored.) The lottery odds were based on combined records from the 2017 and 2018 WNBA seasons. The Aces won the Draft Lottery for the third year in a row, previously selecting Kelsey Plum in 2017 and A'ja Wilson in 2018.

Note: Team selected for the No. 1 pick noted in bold text.

Team	Combined 2017–18 record	Lottery chances	Result
Indiana Fever	15–53	44.2%	3rd pick
**Las Vegas Aces**	**22–46**	**27.6%**	**1st pick**
Chicago Sky	25–43	17.8%	4th pick
New York Liberty	29–39	10.4%	2nd pick

== Draft invitees ==
On April 9, 2019, the WNBA released the names of the players invited to be in attendance at the draft.

- Kristine Anigwe, California
- Kalani Brown, Baylor
- Napheesa Collier, UConn
- Sophie Cunningham, Missouri
- Asia Durr, Louisville
- Megan Gustafson, Iowa
- Han Xu, Xinjiang Magic Deer, China
- Teaira McCowan, Mississippi State
- Arike Ogunbowale, Notre Dame
- Katie Lou Samuelson, UConn
- (Australia) Alanna Smith, Stanford
- Jackie Young, Notre Dame

== Draft selections ==
*	Denotes player who has been selected for at least one All-Star Game and All-WNBA Team
^{+}	Denotes player who has been selected for at least one All-Star Game
^{#}	Denotes player who never played in the WNBA regular season or playoffs
**Bold**	Denotes player who won Rookie of the Year

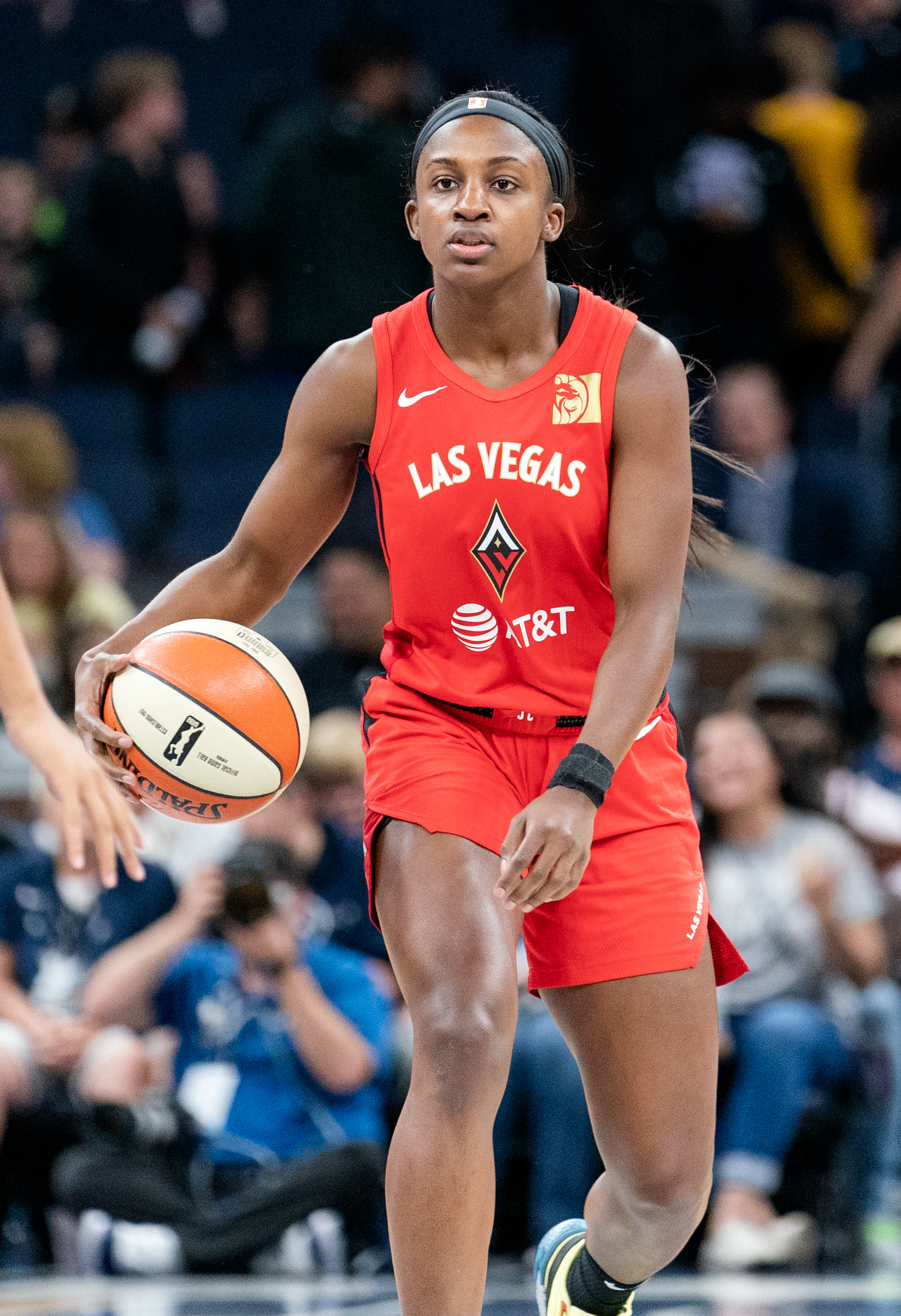
Jackie Young was selected 1st overall by the Las Vegas Aces.

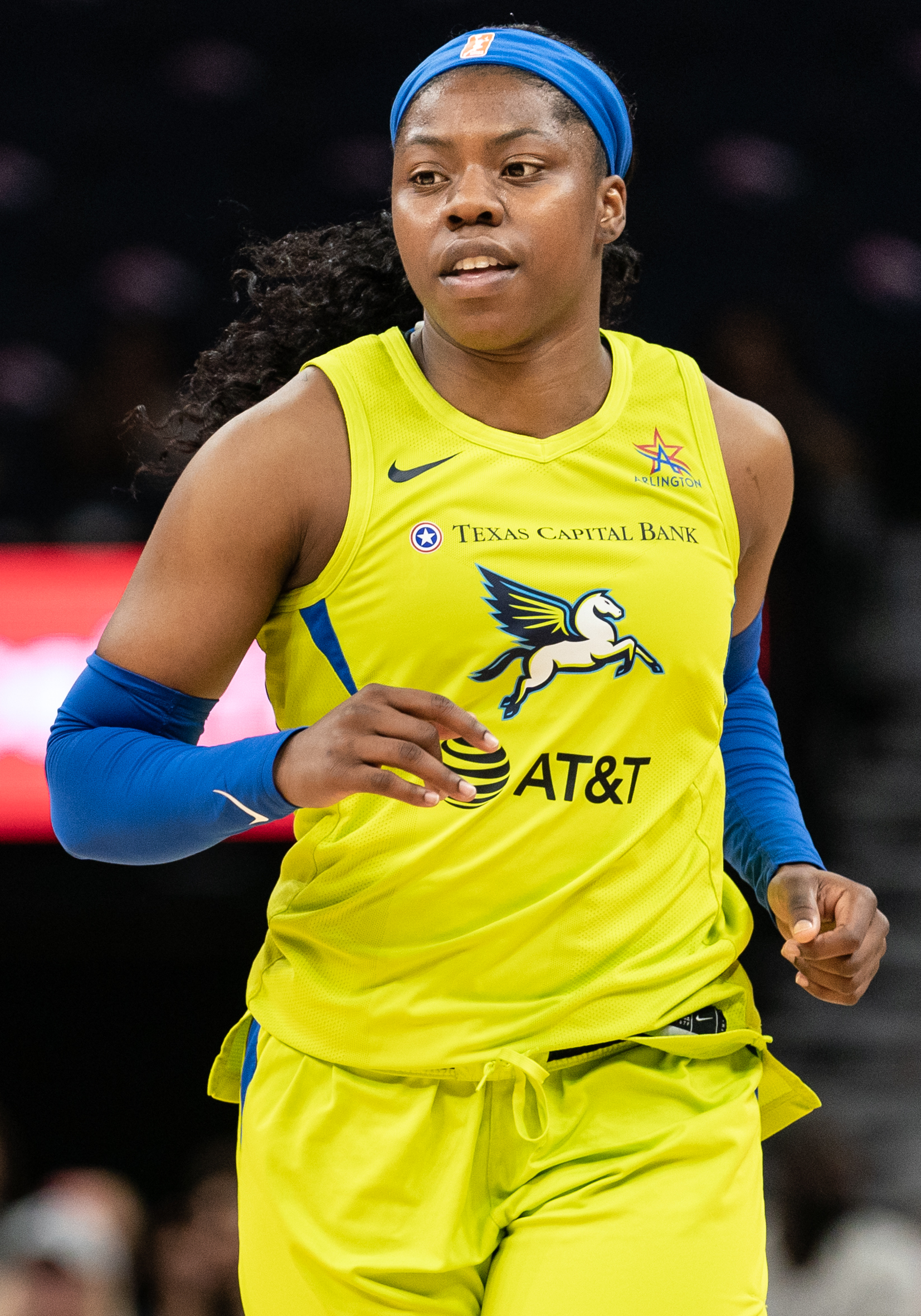
Arike Ogunbowale was selected 5th overall by the Dallas Wings.

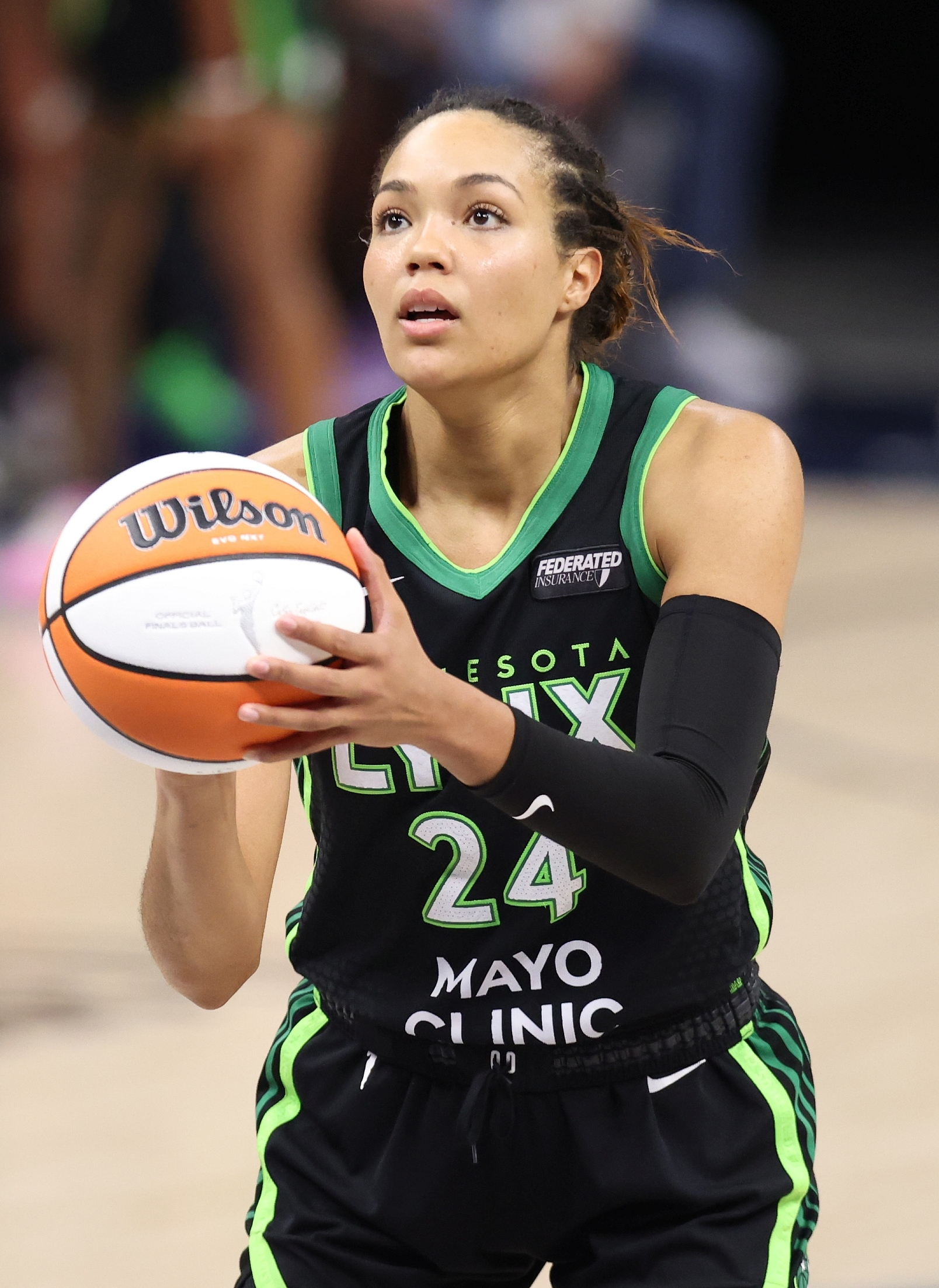
Napheesa Collier was selected 6th overall by the Minnesota Lynx.

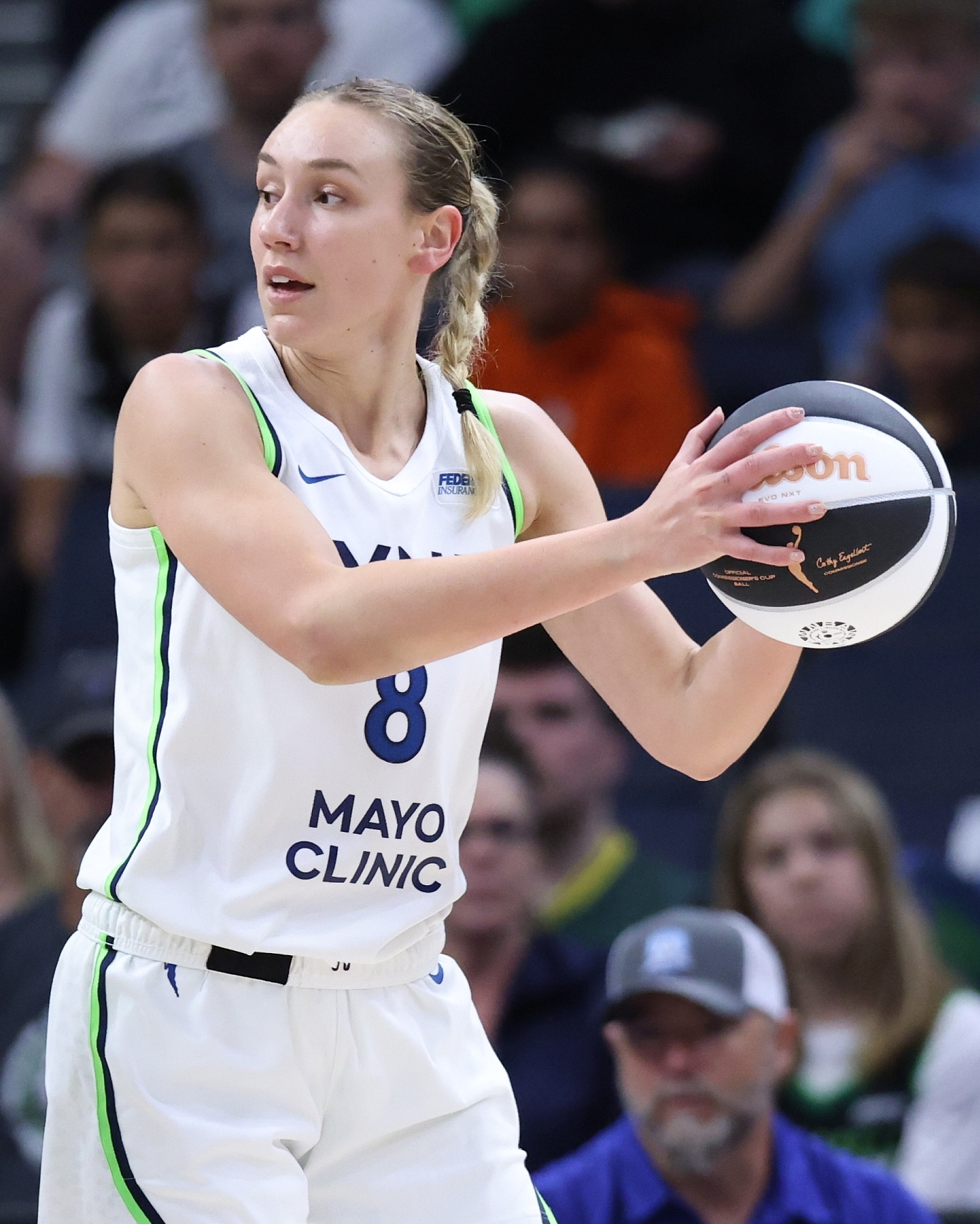
Alanna Smith was selected 8th overall by the Phoenix Mercury.

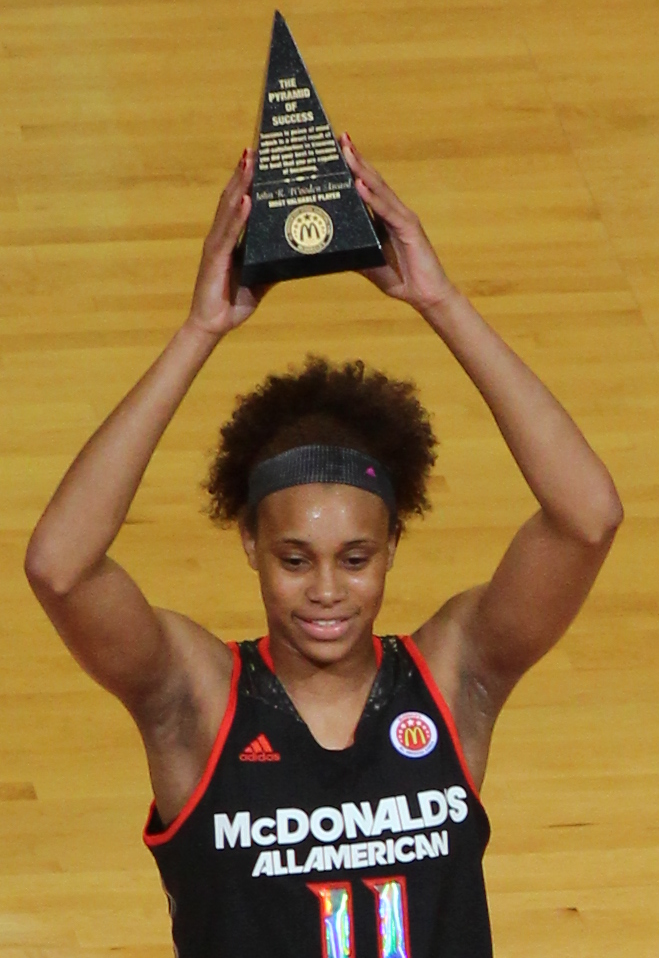
Brianna Turner was selected 11th overall by the Atlanta Dream and sent to the Phoenix Mercury in a draft-day trade.

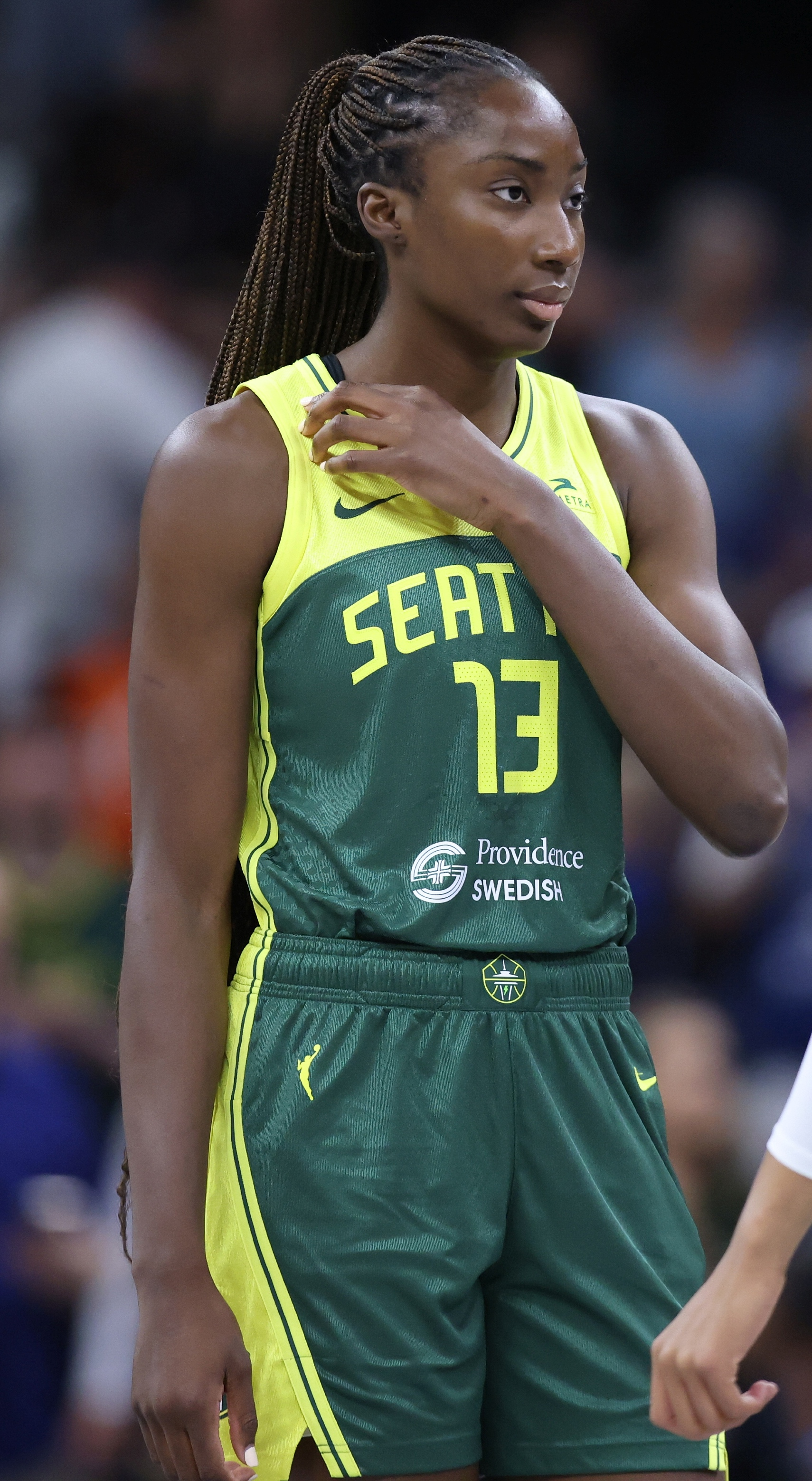
Ezi Magbegor was selected 12th overall by the Seattle Storm.

=== First round ===
Pick	Player	Position	Nationality	Team	School / club team
1	Jackie Young *	G	United States	Las Vegas Aces	Notre Dame
2	Asia Durr	G	United States	New York Liberty	Louisville
3	Teaira McCowan	C	United States	Indiana Fever	Mississippi State
4	Katie Lou Samuelson	G/F	United States	Chicago Sky	Connecticut
5	Arike Ogunbowale *	G	United States	Dallas Wings	Notre Dame
6	**Napheesa Collier** *	F	United States	Minnesota Lynx	Connecticut
7	Kalani Brown	C	United States	Los Angeles Sparks	Baylor
8	Alanna Smith	F	Australia	Phoenix Mercury	Stanford
9	Kristine Anigwe	C/F	United States	Connecticut Sun	California
10	Kiara Leslie	G	United States	Washington Mystics	NC State
11	Brianna Turner	F	United States	Atlanta Dream	Notre Dame
12	Ezi Magbegor ^{+}	F	Australia	Seattle Storm	Melbourne Boomers (Australia)

=== Second round ===
Pick	Player	Position	Nationality	Team	School / club team
13	Sophie Cunningham	G	United States	Phoenix Mercury (from Indiana via Las Vegas) (Note: February 2, 2018: Las Vegas to Phoenix: Phoenix received the 13th pick and a 2018 third-round pick (26th overall); Las Vegas received Kelsey Bone) (Note: February 1, 2018: Indiana to Las Vegas: Indiana received the 28th pick and Kayla Alexander; Las Vegas received the 13th pick)	Missouri
14	Han Xu	C	China	New York Liberty	Xinjiang Magic Deer (China)
15	Chloe Jackson	G	United States	Chicago Sky	Baylor
16	Jessica Shepard ^{+}	F	United States	Minnesota Lynx (from Las Vegas) (Note: April 12, 2018: Las Vegas to Minnesota: Minnesota received the 16th pick and Jill Barta; Las Vegas received Park Ji-su and Kahlia Lawrence)	Notre Dame
17	Megan Gustafson	F/C	United States	Dallas Wings	Iowa
18	Natisha Hiedeman	G	United States	Minnesota Lynx	Marquette
19	Marina Mabrey ^{+}	G	United States	Los Angeles Sparks	Notre Dame
20	Cierra Dillard ^{#}	G	United States	Minnesota Lynx (from Phoenix) (Note: March 6, 2018: Phoenix to Minnesota: Minnesota received the 20th pick and Danielle Robinson; Phoenix received a 2018 first-round pick (12th overall))	Buffalo
21	Bridget Carleton	G	Canada	Connecticut Sun (from Connecticut via Atlanta) (Note: April 12, 2018: Connecticut to Atlanta: Atlanta received the 21st pick and a 2018 second-round pick (15th overall); Connecticut received Bria Holmes) (Note: July 9, 2018: Atlanta to Connecticut: Connecticut re-received the 21st pick and received Layshia Clarendon; Atlanta received Alex Bentley)	Iowa State
22	Kennedy Burke	G	United States	Dallas Wings (from Washington) (Note: July 23, 2018: Washington to Dallas: Dallas received the 22nd pick and Aerial Powers; Washington received Tayler Hill)	UCLA
23	Maite Cazorla	G	Spain	Atlanta Dream	Oregon
24	Anriel Howard	F	United States	Seattle Storm	Mississippi State

=== Third round ===
Pick	Player	Position	Nationality	Team	School / club team
25	Paris Kea	G	United States	Indiana Fever	North Carolina
26	Megan Huff	F	United States	New York Liberty	Utah
27	María Conde	F	Spain	Chicago Sky	Wisła Can-Pack Kraków (Poland)
28	Caliya Robinson^{#}	F	United States	Indiana Fever (from Las Vegas)	Georgia
29	Morgan Bertsch	F	United States	Dallas Wings	UC Davis
30	Kenisha Bell	G	United States	Minnesota Lynx	Minnesota
31	Ángela Salvadores^{#}	G	Spain	Los Angeles Sparks	Ensino (Spain)
32	Arica Carter	G	United States	Phoenix Mercury	Louisville
33	Regan Magarity^{#}	F	Sweden	Connecticut Sun	Virginia Tech
34	Sam Fuehring^{#}	F	United States	Washington Mystics	Louisville
35	Li Yueru	C	China	Atlanta Dream	Guangdong Vermilion Birds (China)
36	Macy Miller^{#}	G	United States	Seattle Storm	South Dakota State

== Draft-day trades ==
Draft-day trades occurred on April 10, 2019, the day of the draft.

- The Atlanta Dream traded Brianna Turner (Notre Dame) for Marie Gülich (from Phoenix Mercury).
- The Minnesota Lynx traded Natisha Hiedeman (Marquette) for Lexie Brown (from Connecticut Sun).

== See also ==
- List of first overall WNBA draft picks
