= Megan Huff =

American basketball player (born 1996)

Personal information
- Born: April 17, 1996 (age 30) Federal Way, Washington
- Listed height: 6 ft 3 in (1.91 m)

Career information
- High school: Todd Beamer (Federal Way, Washington)
- College: Hawaii (2014–2015); Utah (2016–2019)
- WNBA draft: 2019: 3rd round, 26th overall pick
- Drafted by: New York Liberty
- Playing career: 2019–present
- Position: Forward
- Number: 5

Career history
- 2019–2020: TTT Riga
- 2020: Minnesota Lynx
- 2020: Las Vegas Aces

Career highlights
- 2× Big West Sixth Player of the Year (2014, 2015); 2× All-Pac-12 2018, 2019; Big West All-Freshman Team (2015)
- Stats at WNBA.com
- Stats at Basketball Reference

Megan Huff (born April 17, 1996) is an American basketball player. Born in Federal Way, Washington, Huff went to Todd Beamer High School and played collegiately for the University of Hawaii and the University of Utah. She was drafted by the New York Liberty with the 26th overall pick of the 2019 WNBA draft. She played most recently for the Las Vegas Aces.

== College career ==
In 2013, Huff committed to University of Hawaii as a two-sport athlete and the goal "to be a pro volleyball player." In her first year at University of Hawaii, she played on both the volleyball and basketball teams and was named UH's Rookie of the Year for her performance on both teams, as well as Big West's Sixth Player of the Year in the sport of basketball. In her second season of basketball at Hawaii, she led the team in double-doubles (4) and blocks (33) and earned Big West Sixth Player of the Year honors for a second consecutive year. In 2016, Huff announced she was transferring to University of Utah to continue her basketball career. At Utah, Huff became a consistent starter and earned the label "quiet superstar." In two seasons at Utah, she scored over 1,000 points and was named to the All-Pac-12 first team twice.

=== Hawai'i and Utah statistics ===
Legend
GP	Games played	GS	Games started	MPG	Minutes per game
FG%	Field goal percentage	3P%	3-point field goal percentage	FT%	Free throw percentage
RPG	Rebounds per game	APG	Assists per game	SPG	Steals per game
BPG	Blocks per game	PPG	Points per game	**Bold**	Career high

Year	Team	GP	Points	FG%	3P%	FT%	RPG	APG	SPG	BPG	PPG
2014–15	Hawai'i	21	145	46.1%	0.0%	65.0%	4.9	0.3	0.5	**1.2**	6.9
2015–16	Hawai'i	**32**	310	50.2%	**44.4%**	74.3%	6.5	1.1	0.5	1.0	9.7
2016–17	Sat out due to NCAA transfer rules										
2017–18	Utah	30	440	**50.9%**	38.4%	76.8%	7.8	1.4	0.8	0.9	14.7
2018–19	Utah	30	**589**	47.7%	37.0%	**84.3%**	**9.9**	**1.6**	**1.5**	1.1	**19.6**
Career		113	1484	49.0%	37.4%	76.8%	7.4	1.2	0.8	1.0	13.1

== Professional career ==
Huff was drafted by the New York Liberty with the 26th overall pick of the 2019 WNBA draft. She appeared in all four preseason games leading up to the 2019 season, but was waived by the Liberty before the season began. During the 2019–2020 winter season, Huff played in Latvia for TTT Riga. On March 14, 2020, she signed a training camp contract with the Connecticut Sun, however she was waived by the team on May 25. On June 17, Huff signed with the Minnesota Lynx. On July 28, Huff made her WNBA debut, playing three minutes in a loss to Seattle. On August 6, Huff was waived by the Lynx to clear a roster spot for Odyssey Sims, who returned to the team after maternity leave. On August 11, Huff signed with the Las Vegas Aces. On August 17, Las Vegas waived Huff.

== WNBA career statistics ==
Legend
GP	Games played	GS	Games started	MPG	Minutes per game	RPG	Rebounds per game
APG	Assists per game	SPG	Steals per game	BPG	Blocks per game	PPG	Points per game
TO	Turnovers per game	FG%	Field-goal percentage	3P%	3-point field-goal percentage	FT%	Free-throw percentage
**Bold**	Career best	°	League leader

=== Regular season ===
Year	Team	GP	GS	MPG	FG%	3P%	FT%	RPG	APG	SPG	BPG	TO	PPG
2020	Minnesota	3	0	1.7	.000	.000	.000	**1.0**	**0.3**	0.0	0.0	0.0	0.0
2020	Las Vegas	**4**	0	**2.8**	.000	.000	.000	0.3	0.0	0.0	0.0	0.8	0.0
Career	1 year, 2 teams	7	0	2.3	.000	.000	.000	0.6	0.1	0.0	0.0	0.4	0.0
