= 2021–22 Bendigo Spirit season =

Women's National Basketball League season

- Head Coach: Tracy York
- Captain: Tessa Lavey
- Venue: Bendigo Stadium

Results
- Record: 7–9
- Ladder: 5th
- Finals: Did not qualify

Leaders
- Points: Maley (19.8)
- Rebounds: Maley (15.6)
- Assists: Lavey (4.9)

The 2021–22 Bendigo Spirit season is the 15th season for the franchise in the Women's National Basketball League (WNBL).

== Roster ==
2021–22 Bendigo Spirit roster
Players
Coaches

Pos.	No.	Nat.	Name	Ht.
F	2	(New Zealand)	Goulding, Mary	1.83 m (6 ft 0 in)
G	3	(Australia)	Garrick, Madeleine (C)	1.78 m (5 ft 10 in)
G	6	(Australia)	McLean, Cassidy	1.78 m (5 ft 10 in)
F	11	(Australia)	Goodchild, Alana	1.83 m (6 ft 0 in)
F/C	13	(Australia)	Rintala, Jennie	1.88 m (6 ft 2 in)
F	15	(Australia)	Maley, Anneli	1.88 m (6 ft 2 in)
F/C	16	(Australia)	Dunlop, Piper	1.88 m (6 ft 2 in)
G	22	(Australia)	Wilson, Alex	1.80 m (5 ft 11 in)
F	23	(Australia)	Skinner, Demi	1.90 m (6 ft 3 in)
G	24	(Australia)	Lavey, Tessa (C)	1.72 m (5 ft 8 in)
F/C	25	(Australia)	McKay, Megan	1.92 m (6 ft 4 in)
F	40	(Australia)	Boag, Carly	1.88 m (6 ft 2 in)

Head coach

- (Australia) Tracy York

Assistant coach(es)

- (Australia) Mark Alabakov
- (Australia) Mikaela Dombkins
- (Australia) Rebecca Dudic
- (Australia) Carly Stones

Legend

- (C) Team captain
- (DP) Development player
- (I) Import player
- Injured

- Roster
Updated: 20 March 2022

== Standings ==
#	WNBL Championship ladder				
#	Team	W	L	PCT	GP
1	Melbourne Boomers	12	5	70.5	17
2	Perth Lynx	11	5	68.7	16
3	Canberra Capitals	11	6	64.7	17
4	Adelaide Lightning	10	7	58.8	17
5	Bendigo Spirit	7	9	43.7	16
6	Townsville Fire	7	10	41.1	17
7	Southside Flyers	5	12	29.4	17
8	Sydney Uni Flames	4	13	23.5	17

== Results ==
=== Regular season ===
Game	Date	Team	Score	High points	High rebounds	High assists	Location	Record
1	December; 4	@ Southside	83–94	Lavey, Maley (15)	Maley (14)	Mitchell (7)	Dandenong Stadium	0–1
2	December; 8	Melbourne	63–58	Maley (18)	Maley (13)	Lavey (5)	Bendigo Stadium	1–1
3	December; 19	Melbourne	56–81	Garrick (17)	Maley (11)	McKay (3)	Bendigo Stadium	1–2
4	December; 22	@ Canberra	88–100	Maley (38)	Maley (20)	Maley, Mitchell (4)	National Convention Centre	1–3
5	January; 21	Townsville	67–77	Maley (18)	Maley (24)	Wilson (6)	Bendigo Stadium	1–4
6	January; 23	@ Canberra	60–94	Maley (15)	Maley (11)	Wilson (5)	National Convention Centre	1–5
7	January; 25	Sydney	72–83	Maley (20)	Maley (15)	Maley (7)	Bendigo Stadium	1–6
8	January; 29	@ Perth	82–90	Garrick (18)	Maley (10)	Lavey (7)	Selkirk Stadium	1–7
9	February; 5	@ Adelaide	74–62	Maley (26)	Maley (21)	Lavey (5)	The Lights Community and Sports Centre	2–7
10	February; 17	@ Townsville	76–71	Maley (25)	Maley (19)	Lavey (7)	Townsville Entertainment Centre	3–7
11	February; 24	Adelaide	77–84	Maley (21)	Maley (12)	Lavey (5)	Bendigo Stadium	3–8
12	February; 26	@ Southside	96–80	Maley (35)	Maley (18)	Maley (6)	MyState Bank Arena	4–8
13	March; 2	Southside	78–70	Maley (19)	Maley (19)	Lavey (8)	MyState Bank Arena	5–8
14	March; 6	@ Melbourne	68–65	Maley (17)	Maley (15)	Garrick, Maley (4)	Melbourne Sports Centre Parkville	6–8
15	March; 12	Sydney	56–61	Maley (14)	Maley (16)	Lavey (4)	Bendigo Stadium	6–9
16	March; 20	@ Sydney	85–73	Garrick (32)	Maley (13)	Lavey (9)	Brydens Stadium	7–9
