= Marina Mabrey =

American basketball player (born 1996)

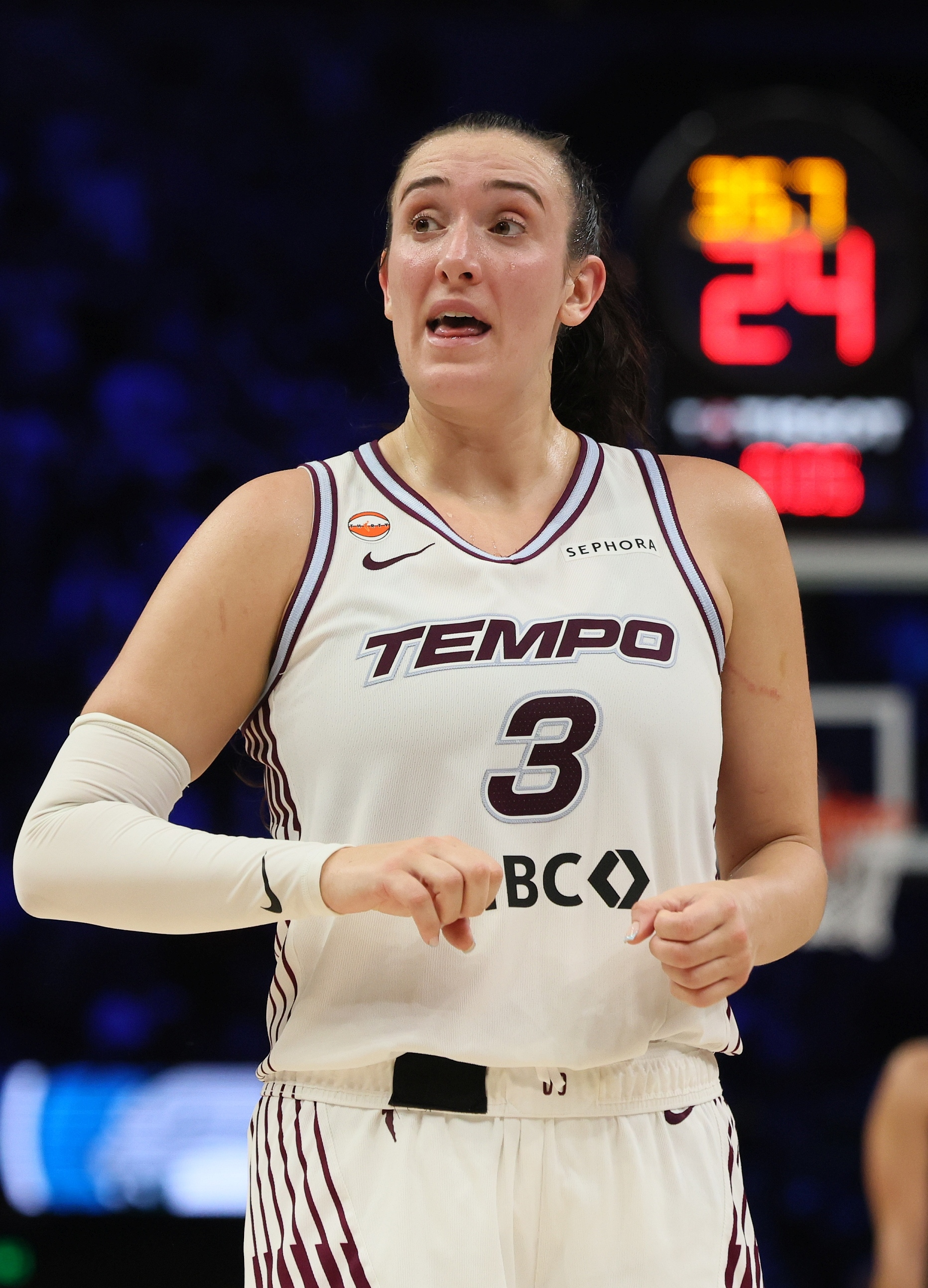
- Mabrey with the Toronto Tempo in 2026

No. 3 – Toronto Tempo
- Position: Shooting guard
- League: WNBA

Personal information
- Born: September 14, 1996 (age 30) Belmar, New Jersey, U.S.
- Listed height: 6 ft 1 in (1.85 m)
- Listed weight: 186 lb (84 kg)

Career information
- High school: Manasquan (Manasquan, New Jersey)
- College: Notre Dame (2015–2019)
- WNBA draft: 2019: 2nd round, 19th overall pick
- Drafted by: Los Angeles Sparks
- Playing career: 2019–present

Career history
- 2019–2020: Los Angeles Sparks
- 2019–2020: TTT Riga
- 2020–2022: Dallas Wings
- 2020–2021: Bnot Hertzeliya
- 2021–2022: Perth Lynx
- 2022–2023: Beretta Famila Schio
- 2023–2024: Chicago Sky
- 2023–2024: Çukurova Basketbol
- 2024–2025: Connecticut Sun
- 2025: Phantom BC
- 2026–present: Lunar Owls BC
- 2026–present: Toronto Tempo

Career highlights
- WNBA All-Star (2026); LBF champion (2023); Italian Cup winner (2023); WBBL champion (2020); All-EuroLeague First Team (2024); All-EuroLeague Second Team (2023); All-WNBL Second Team (2022); NCAA champion (2018); Second-team All-ACC (2018); ACC All-Freshman Team (2016); McDonald's All-American Game Co-MVP (2015)
- Stats at WNBA.com
- Stats at Basketball Reference
Medals
Women's basketball
Representing United States
FIBA Under-18 Americas Championship
Gold medal – first place	2014 United States	Team

Marina Alise Mabrey (born September 14, 1996), nicknamed "Money Mabrey", is an American professional basketball player for the Toronto Tempo of the Women's National Basketball Association (WNBA) and for Lunar Owls of Unrivaled.

Mabrey played college basketball at Notre Dame, where she won a national championship in 2018 and left as the program's all-time leader in three-pointers. She was selected 19th overall by the Los Angeles Sparks in the 2019 WNBA draft. Mabrey later played for the Dallas Wings, Chicago Sky, and Connecticut Sun. In 2026, she joined the Toronto Tempo as the face of the expansion franchise and became the first million-dollar player in WNBA history. In her first season with the Tempo, Mabrey earned her first WNBA All-Star selection, and tied league single-game records in points (53) and three-pointers (9).

In addition to the WNBA, Mabrey has played professionally in Latvia, Israel, Australia, Italy, and Turkey. She led Beretta Famila Schio to the Lega Basket Femminile championship in 2023. Her accolades overseas include one All-WNBL Team and two All-EuroLeague selections. In Unrivaled, Mabrey has competed for Phantom and Lunar Owls, and holds the league's single-game scoring record with 47 points.

== Early life ==
Mabrey was born in Belmar, New Jersey to Patti and Roy Mabrey. She has two brothers, Ryan and Roy, and two sisters Michaela and Dara. It was Roy's and Michaela's love of basketball that first involved Marina in the game. Her mother coached basketball in their area and Marina, Roy and Michaela would go along with their mother and join in the practices. Fierce basketball competition became a part of family life in the Mabrey household with Marina frequently competing with her older brother and sister in their driveway and local park.

Mabrey attended Manasquan High School in Manasquan, New Jersey, where she was part of two teams that won the state Tournament of Champions and shared most valuable player honors in the McDonald's All-American Game in 2015.

Despite her sister Michaela's success as part of the Notre Dame Fighting Irish women's basketball team, Marina doubted whether or not to choose that college when she was considering many offers for a basketball scholarship after high school. She chose to join up with coach Muffet McGraw's squad at Notre Dame in 2015.

== College career ==
Mabrey joined sister Michaela in the 2015–16 Notre Dame Fighting Irish women's basketball team, following a season in which the team were runners-up in the national championship but required some rebuilding. She quickly established herself and won "rookie of the week" in November 2015 after recording a triple-double at Valparaiso. Her 35 appearances as a rookie, 85 three-pointers (which ranks as the second most for a single season in program history) and an impressive 10.7 points per game gained her honors in the ACC All-Freshman Team (Blue Ribbon Panel & Coaches) and ACC All-Academic Team.

The 2016–17 Notre Dame Fighting Irish women's basketball team reached the Elite Eight but fell for the second year running to Stanford Cardinal women's basketball. Mabrey was chosen along with Arike Ogunbowale and Lindsay Allen for the regional all-tournament team.

The Notre Dame team for the following two years saw records fall, two national championship games and one championship victory. Mabrey was a key component of a team that survived a rash of injuries that won the 2018 national championship and commented later that the injuries had given the now smaller team an added mental toughness that "there is no-one else to sub in" and that they had to battle through. The fighting mentality led to comebacks throughout the season with Mabrey moving to a more direct point guard role and taking more leadership with the largest fightback in Notre Dame history coming back against Tennessee from 23 points behind. The team executed the largest comeback in a championship game in NCAA women's basketball history, overcoming a 15-point deficit to achieve a 61–58 victory over fellow No. 1 seed Mississippi State.

She graduated in 2019 as Notre Dame's all-time leader in made three-pointers with 274; 1,896 career points ranks eighth all-time and a career 81.7 percent from the line – ranking sixth for Notre Dame.

== Professional career ==
=== WNBA ===
==== Los Angeles Sparks (2019) ====
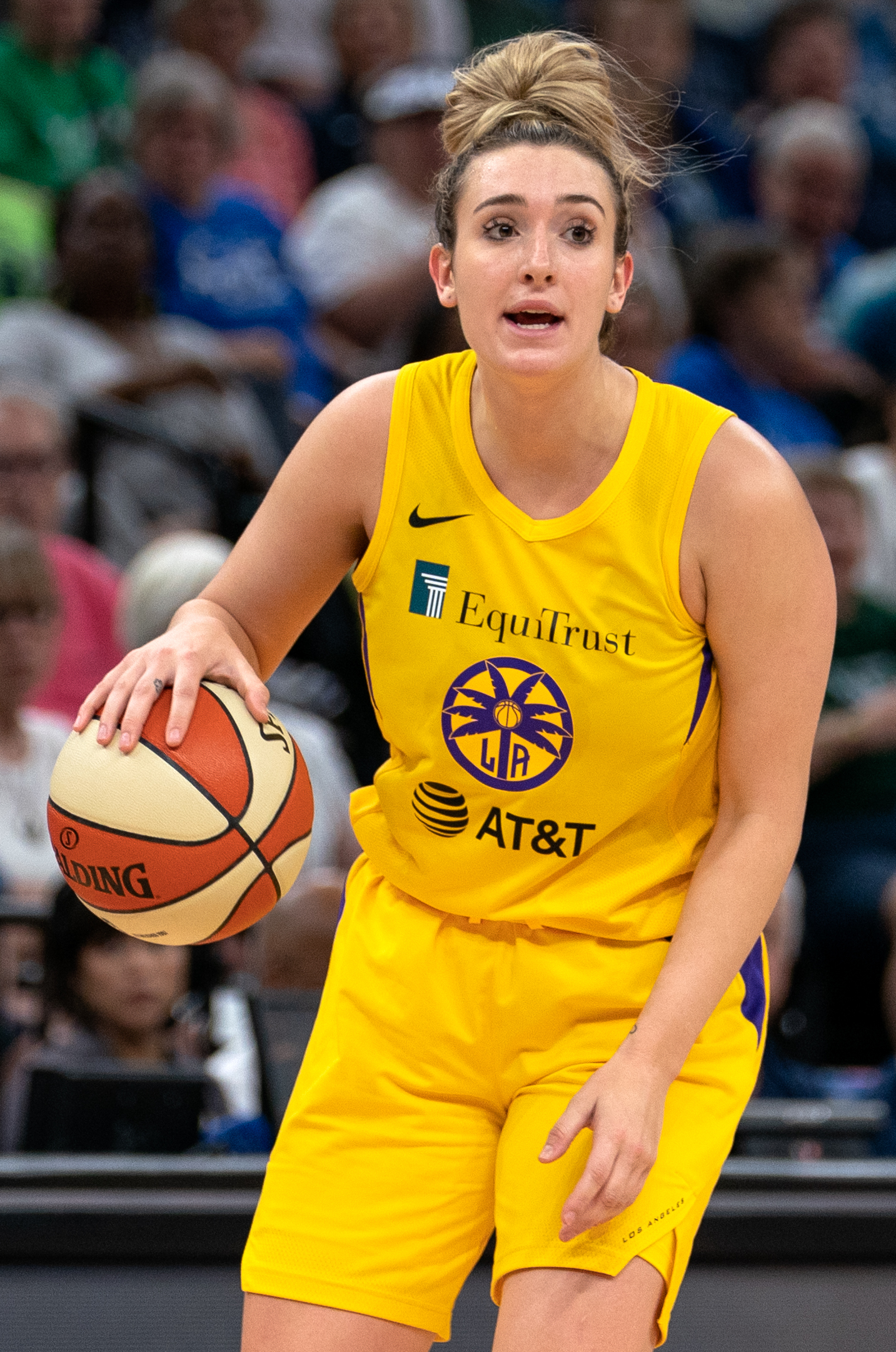
Mabrey with the LA Sparks in 2019.

Mabrey was drafted 19th overall in the 2019 WNBA draft by the Los Angeles Sparks. The Sparks, under new head coach Derek Fisher, reached the play-off semi-finals with a regular season record of 22–12. Mabrey saw limited minutes during the playoffs. She appeared in 31 games with the Sparks during her rookie season and averaged 4.0 points, 1.2 rebounds and 1.0 assists while shooting 34.4% from the field.

==== Dallas Wings (2020–2022) ====
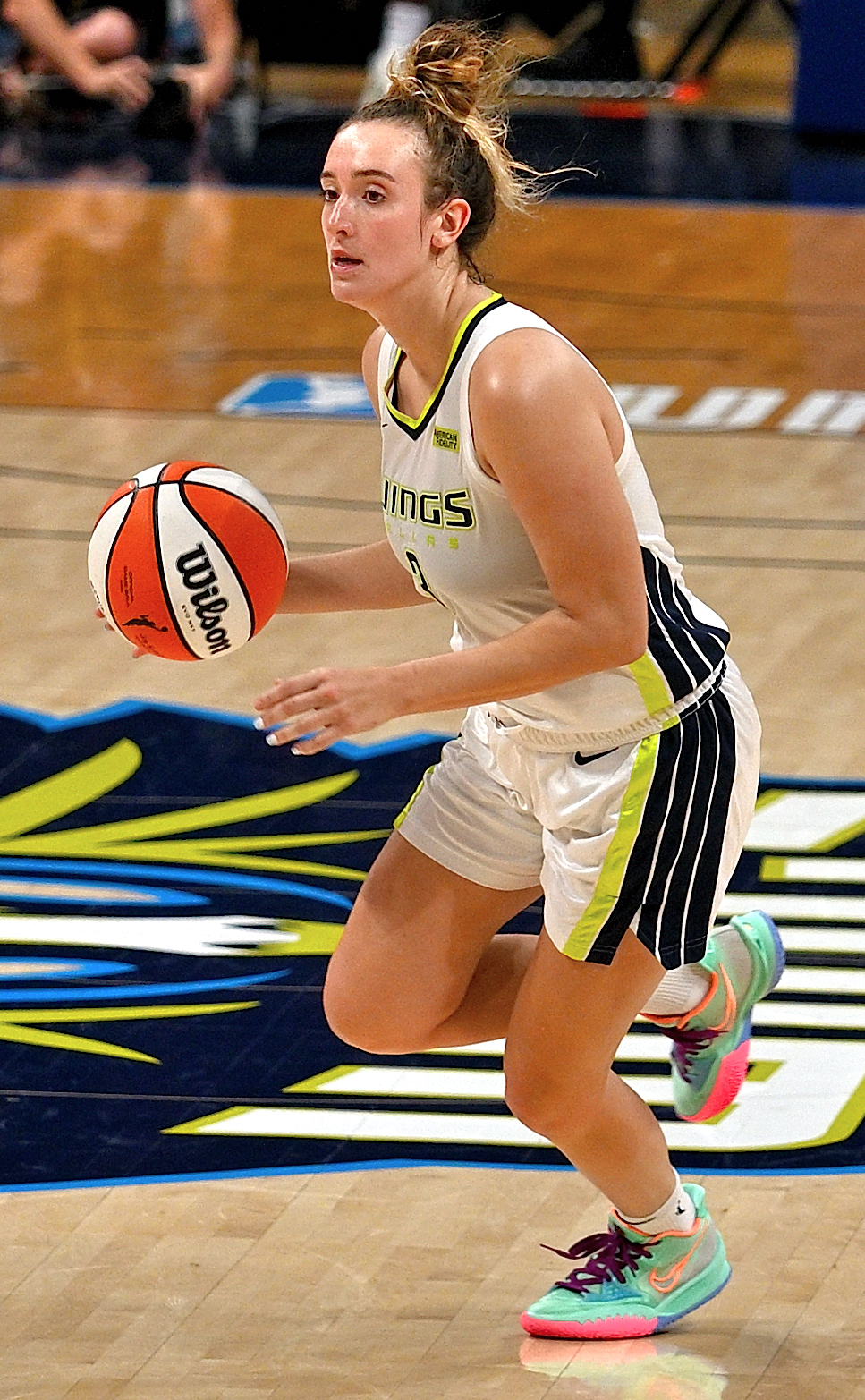
Mabrey with the Dallas Wings in 2021.

Prior to the 2020 WNBA season, Mabrey was traded by the Sparks to the Dallas Wings for a 2021 second round draft choice. Due to the COVID-19 pandemic, the 2020 WNBA season was reduced to a 22-game regular season at IMG Academy, without fans present. In 19 games for the Wings, Mabrey averaged 10.0 points, 3.1 rebounds, 2.3 assists and 1.3 steals per game.

Mabrey returned to the Dallas Wings for the 2021 WNBA season.

==== Chicago Sky (2023–2024) ====
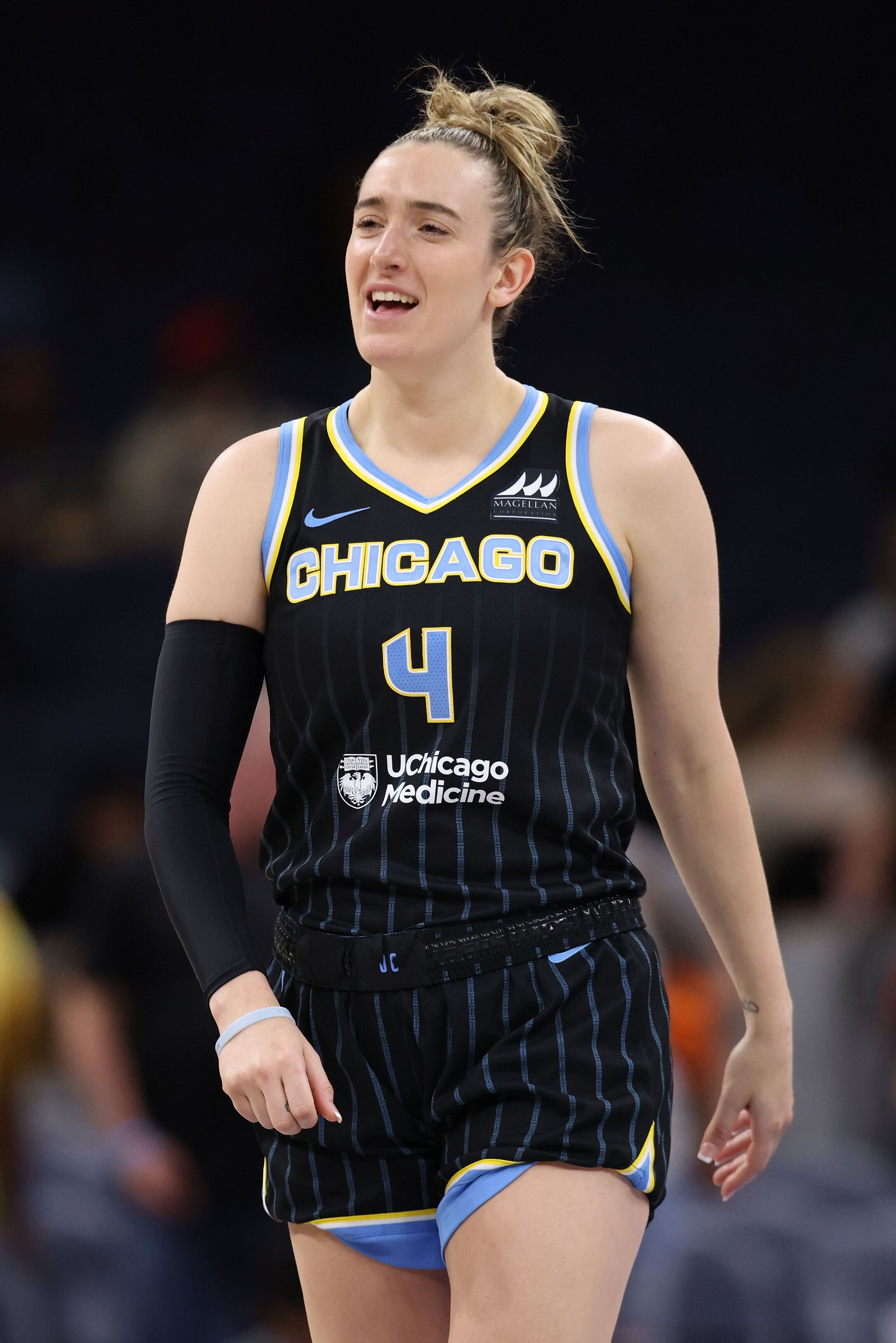
Mabrey with the Chicago Sky in 2024

On February 11, 2023, Mabrey was traded to the Chicago Sky in a four-team trade also involving the New York Liberty, Phoenix Mercury, Dallas Wings.

==== Connecticut Sun (2024–2025) ====
On July 17, 2024, Mabrey was traded to the Connecticut Sun (along with a 2025 2nd round draft pick) from the Chicago Sky, in exchange for guards Rachel Banham and Moriah Jefferson, a 2025 1st round pick, and the rights to swap 2026 first round picks.

==== Toronto Tempo (2026–present) ====
On April 3, 2026, Mabrey was drafted sixth overall by the Toronto Tempo in the 2026 WNBA expansion draft. On June 25, she dropped 53 points against the Los Angeles Sparks, shooting 17/28 from the field and 9/18 from three, tying the records for most points and most three-point field goals in a WNBA game.

=== Overseas ===
For the 2019–20 season, Mabrey moved to Latvia to play for TTT Riga. In her first game she scored 24 points and led her team with eight rebounds to win 89–81 over defending champions UMMC Ekaterinburg which contained WNBA players Brittney Griner, Courtney Vandersloot and Emma Meesseman. Riga won only two of the following nine matches that were played. Mabrey settled in well in a young team and at the suspension of play she was eighth in the league in points per game (15.8). She left Latvia in mid-March after European play was cancelled due to the COVID-19 pandemic.

For the 2020–21 season, Mabrey moved to Israel to play for Bnot Hertzeliya. In 22 games, she averaged 23.2 points, 8.0 rebounds, 6.9 assists and 2.4 steals per game.

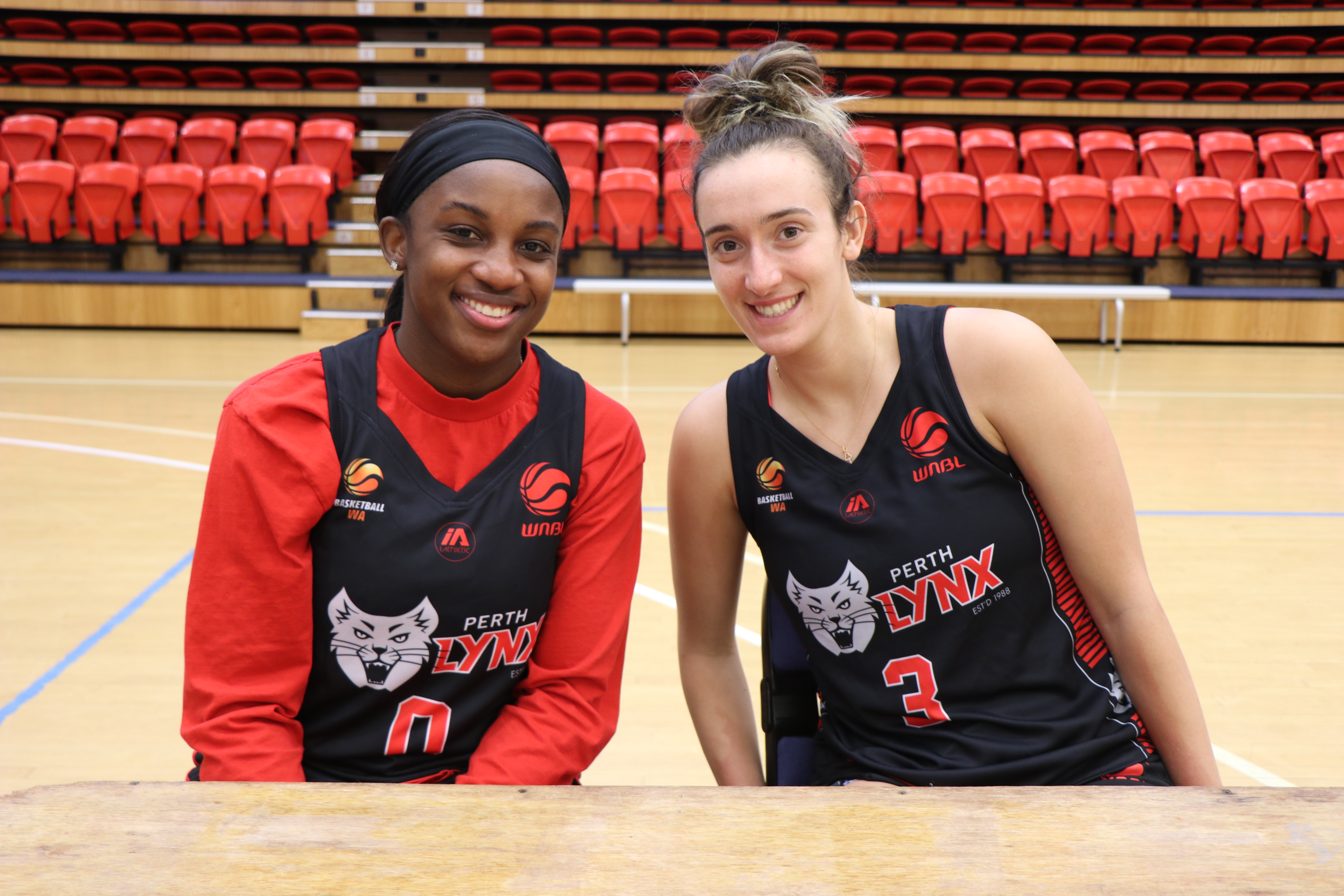
Mabrey and Jackie Young with the Perth Lynx in December 2021

Mabrey signed with the Perth Lynx in Australia for the 2021–22 WNBL season. In her debut for the Lynx on January 2, 2022, she scored a game-high 30 points with seven 3-pointers in an 88–86 loss to the Adelaide Lightning. On January 23, she scored 34 points in an 86–81 win over the Sydney Uni Flames. Following this game, she was unavailable for over a month due to a foot injury but returned to contribute to the Lynx ending the season as runners-up in the WBNL to Melbourne Boomers after losing the final series by two matches to one.

In 2023, she won her first national title since the 2018 NCAA tournament when she and team Famila Schio won the Coppa Italia beating Venezia 73–62 with Mabrey scoring eleven points in the final. Having qualified for the Scudetto playoffs, Mabrey's twenty four points and dominant performance in the third quarter of the quarter final pulled her team from a weak first half against Campobasso to a twenty four point victory. She followed this up two weeks later with seventeen point performance and vital bucket and interception in the last seconds to win a bronze medal with PF Schio for third place in the 2022–23 EuroLeague Women finals in Prague. This was the first medal performance for an Italian team in twenty years and PF Schio's first ever appearance in the finals. Within two weeks she added the gold medal for the Italian championship turning in a thirty seven point performance in the final game including a crucial three pointer in the last seconds as PF Schio beat Virtus Bologna 84–79 in the decisive second match of the play-offs.

=== Unrivaled ===
On August 17, 2024, it was announced that Mabrey would appear and play in the inaugural season of Unrivaled, a new women's 3-on-3 basketball league founded by Napheesa Collier and Breanna Stewart. She was selected for Phantom. In pre-season training, Mabrey sustained a right calf injury requiring a minimum of 2-weeks rest and her missing the start of the 2025 Unrivaled season. Mabrey ended up playing only 3 games during Unrivaled.

On November 5, 2025, it was announced that Mabrey had been drafted by Lunar Owls BC for the 2026 Unrivaled season.

On January 30, 2026 in the game against Rose, Mabrey scored 47 points, breaking the Unrivaled record for most points in a game. She broke the record for most three-point shots made in a game, scoring 10 threes. Her 27 points in the first quarter are the most in any quarter in Unrivaled. Quarters are 7 minutes long.

== Career statistics ==
Legend
GP	Games played	GS	Games started	MPG	Minutes per game	RPG	Rebounds per game
APG	Assists per game	SPG	Steals per game	BPG	Blocks per game	PPG	Points per game
TO	Turnovers per game	FG%	Field-goal percentage	3P%	3-point field-goal percentage	FT%	Free-throw percentage
**Bold**	Career best	°	League leader

*	Denotes season(s) in which Mabrey won an NCAA Championship

=== WNBA ===
==== Regular season ====
WNBA regular season statistics
Year	Team	GP	GS	MPG	FG%	3P%	FT%	RPG	APG	SPG	BPG	TO	PPG
2019	Los Angeles	31	0	11.5	.344	.273	.875	1.2	1.0	.6	.2	**.8**	4.0
2020	Dallas	19	12	21.3	.430	.418	.667	3.1	2.3	**1.3**	.1	1.6	10.0
2021	Dallas	32	8	24.2	.405	.342	**.882**	3.9	2.9	1.0	.3	2.1	13.3
2022	Dallas	34	32	28.0	.420	.351	.681	3.6	3.7	.8	.4	2.4	13.6
2023	Chicago	**39**	**39**	30.0	.411	.390	.836	3.7	3.6	.7	.5	2.2	15.0
2024	Chicago	24	24	**33.2**	.381	.350	.723	**4.9**	**4.5**	**1.3**	.3	2.8	14.0
2024	Connecticut	16	3	27.4	**.467**	**.424**	.682	3.5	3.3	1.0	**.6**	1.7	14.9
2025	Connecticut	35	34	31.5	.367	.270	.870	4.2	4.0	.7	.3	2.8	14.4
2026	Toronto	32	32	29.5	.441	.385	.881	3.3	3.7	.9	.4	3.1	**20.8**
**Career**	8 years, 5 teams	262	184	26.5	.408	.353	.817	3.5	3.3	.9	.3	2.2	13.5

==== Playoffs ====
WNBA playoff statistics
Year	Team	GP	GS	MPG	FG%	3P%	FT%	RPG	APG	SPG	BPG	TO	PPG
2019	Los Angeles	3	0	5.3	.333	**.500**	—	1.0	.7	.0	.0	.3	1.7
2021	Dallas	1	0	17.0	.125	.250	—	3.0	2.0	.0	.0	**.0**	3.0
2022	Dallas	3	3	32.7	**.429**	.455	**1.000**	**4.0**	1.7	**.7**	.7	4.7°	15.0
2023	Chicago	2	2	32.5	.348	.222	**1.000**	3.5	1.5	.0	**1.5**	3.0	9.5
2024	Connecticut	**7**	**4**	**33.0**	.368	.339	.923	3.0	**2.6**	.1	.9	1.9	**15.9**
**Career**	5 years, 4 teams	16	9	26.7	.368	.341	.944	2.9	1.9	.2	.7	2.1	11.4

=== EuroLeague ===
Year	Team	GP	MPG	FG%	3P%	FT%	RPG	APG	SPG	BPG	TO	PPG
2019–20	TTT Riga	9	27.2	.317	.274	.800	4.2	3.9	1.1	.1	5.0	15.8
2022–23	PF Schio	14	28.8	.403	.362	.633	4.1	3.6	1.2	.1	2.4	14.7

=== D1 (Israel) ===
Year	Team	GP	MPG	FG%	3P%	FT%	RPG	APG	SPG	BPG	TO	PPG
2020–21	Bnot Hertzeliya	22	.332	.558	.344	.840	8.0	6.9	2.4	.2	4.6	23.2

=== WNBL (Australia) ===
Year	Team	GP	FG%	3P%	FT%	RPG	APG	SPG	BPG	TO	PPG
2022	Perth Lynx	16	.385	.350	.803	4.8	2.9	1.3	.1	2.6	19.1

=== Italy Seria A ===
Year	Team	GP	MIN	PTS	2PTS	3PTS	FT	RO	RD	RT	AS	PF	BS	STL	TO
2022–23	PF Schio	26	684	486	99-204	76-103	60-74	23	90	113	80	53	6	26	59

=== College ===
NCAA statistics
Year	Team	GP	Points	FG%	3P%	FT%	RPG	APG	SPG	BPG	PPG
2015–16	Notre Dame	35	373	**.514**	**.453**	.817	2.8	2.0	1.5	.3	10.7
2016–17	Notre Dame	37	540	.471	.383	.843	3.0	2.5	1.5	**.5**	**14.6**
2017–18*	Notre Dame	**38**	**549**	.458	.390	**.857**	**4.4**	4.4	**2.1**	.3	14.4
2018–19	Notre Dame	35	434	.466	.408	.694	2.7	**4.9**	1.3	.3	12.4
**Career**		145	1896	.474	.400	.817	3.2	3.4	1.6	.4	13.1

== Personal life ==
In 2019, Mabrey sold shirts bearing the phrase "This Is My Kitchen", a reference to sexism in sports and her 2018 NCAA Women's Basketball Championship win.
