= 2021–22 Canberra Capitals season =

Women's National Basketball season

- Head Coach: Paul Goriss
- Captain: Kelsey Griffin
- Venue: National Convention Centre

Results
- Record: 11–6
- Ladder: 3rd
- Finals: TBD

Leaders

The 2021–22 Canberra Capitals season is the 38th season for the franchise in the Women's National Basketball League (WNBL).

== Roster ==
2021–22 Canberra Capitals roster
Players
Coaches

Pos.	No.	Nat.	Name	Ht.
G	2	(United States)	Smart, Brittany	1.70 m (5 ft 7 in)
F/C	3	(United States)	Ruef, Mikaela	1.91 m (6 ft 3 in)
G	4	(Australia)	Tupaea, Tahlia	1.75 m (5 ft 9 in)
G	5	(Australia)	Melbourne, Jade	1.76 m (5 ft 9 in)
G/F	6	(Australia)	Swain, Shaneice	1.75 m (5 ft 9 in)
G	8	(Australia)	Cubillo, Abby	1.61 m (5 ft 3 in)
F	9	(Australia)	Froling, Alicia	1.90 m (6 ft 3 in)
G	20	(United States)	Sykes, Brittney	1.75 m (5 ft 9 in)
G	22	(Australia)	Wilson, Kelly	1.70 m (5 ft 7 in)
F	23	(Australia)	Griffin, Kelsey (C)	1.88 m (6 ft 2 in)
C	43	(Australia)	Bunton, Alex	1.96 m (6 ft 5 in)

Head coach

- (Australia) Paul Goriss

Assistant coach(es)

- (New Zealand) Kennedy Kereama
- (Australia) Carly Wilson

Legend

- (C) Team captain
- (DP) Development player
- (I) Import player
- Injured

- Roster
Updated: 26 November 2021

== Standings ==
#	WNBL Championship ladder				
#	Team	W	L	PCT	GP
1	Melbourne Boomers	12	5	70.5	17
2	Perth Lynx	11	5	68.7	16
3	Canberra Capitals	11	6	64.7	17
4	Adelaide Lightning	10	7	58.8	17
5	Bendigo Spirit	7	9	43.7	16
6	Townsville Fire	7	10	41.1	17
7	Southside Flyers	5	12	29.4	17
8	Sydney Uni Flames	4	13	23.5	17

== Results ==
=== Regular season ===
Game	Date	Team	Score	High points	High rebounds	High assists	Location	Record
1	December; 5	@ Sydney	58–55	Sykes (16)	Griffin (11)	Wilson (6)	Qudos Bank Arena	1–0
2	December; 19	Adelaide	62–88	Melbourne (18)	Ruef (10)	Sykes (7)	National Convention Centre	1–1
3	December; 22	Bendigo	100–88	Sykes (33)	Bunton (6)	Wilson (9)	National Convention Centre	2–1
4	December; 31	@ Townsville	76–52	Griffin (20)	Griffin, Ruef (9)	Wilson (8)	Townsville Entertainment Centre	3–1
5	January; 14	Perth	69–88	Griffin (15)	Sykes (11)	Sykes (3)	National Convention Centre	3–2
6	January; 19	@ Perth	73–102	Griffin (17)	Ruef (7)	Tupaea, Wilson (4)	Selkirk Stadium	3–3
7	January; 23	Bendigo	94–60	Melbourne (19)	Ruef (13)	Sykes (7)	National Convention Centre	4–3
8	January; 28	Sydney	86–54	Sykes (17)	Ruef (10)	Sykes, Wilson (6)	National Convention Centre	5–3
9	January; 30	@ Adelaide	80–67	Ruef (20)	Griffin, Ruef (10)	Sykes (7)	The Lights Community and Sports Centre	6–3
10	February; 5	Southside	94–69	Bunton (21)	Bunton (13)	Wilson (11)	National Convention Centre	7–3
11	February; 17	Southside	20–0^{[a]}	–	–	–	National Convention Centre	8–3
12	February; 19	Townsville	84–58	Griffin (18)	Griffin (11)	Sykes, Wilson (7)	National Convention Centre	9–3
13	February; 27	Melbourne	76–78	Griffin (20)	Griffin (9)	Wilson (5)	National Convention Centre	9–4
14	March; 5	@ Southside	106–64	Sykes (24)	Griffin (10)	Sykes (8)	Dandenong Stadium	10–4
15	March; 12	@ Perth	96–80	Sykes (32)	Griffin (11)	Sykes (9)	Bendat Basketball Centre	11–4
16	March; 17	@ Adelaide	50–81	Swain (10)	Froling (7)	Wilson (3)	The Lights Community and Sports Centre	11–5
17	March; 19	@ Melbourne	52–107	Sykes (14)	Griffin (5)	Melbourne, Sykes, Wilson (2)	Melbourne Sports Centre Parkville	11–6

=== Finals ===
==== Semi-finals ====
Game	Date	Team	Score	High points	High rebounds	High assists	Location	Series
1	March; 24	@ Perth					Bendat Basketball Centre	
2	March; 27	Perth					Southern Cross Stadium	
3	March; 31	@ Perth					Bendat Basketball Centre	

Notes

- ^{a} Canberra's Round 11 game against the Southside Flyers was a win by forfeit.
