= 2021–22 Townsville Fire season =

Women's National Basketball season

- Head Coach: Shannon Seebohm
- Captain: Mia Murray; Lauren Nicholson (co)
- Venue: Townsville Entertainment Centre

Results
- Record: 7–10
- Ladder: 6th
- Finals: Did not qualify

Leaders
- Points: Billings (15.9)
- Rebounds: Aokuso (7.7)
- Assists: Reid (4.9)

The 2021–22 Townsville Fire season was the 21st season for the franchise in the Women's National Basketball League (WNBL).

James Cook University remained as the Fire's naming rights partner after signing a three-year extension in September 2019. Mia Murray & Lauren Nicholson were named as Co-Captains for the 2021–22 season.

== Roster ==
2021–22 Townsville Fire roster
Players
Coaches

Pos.	No.	Nat.	Name	Ht.
G	0	(United States)	Sutton, Sug	1.73 m (5 ft 8 in)
G	1	(Australia)	Nicholson, Lauren (injured) (C)	1.80 m (5 ft 11 in)
G	3	(Australia)	Reid, Stephanie	1.68 m (5 ft 6 in)
G/F	7	(Australia)	Woods, Courtney	1.83 m (6 ft 0 in)
G	10	(Australia)	Murray, Mia (C)	1.85 m (6 ft 1 in)
F	12	(Australia)	Payne, Nadeen	1.88 m (6 ft 2 in)
F	14	(Australia)	McSpadden, Lara	1.94 m (6 ft 4 in)
C	15	(Australia)	Aokuso, Zitina	1.94 m (6 ft 4 in)
G	23	(Australia)	Fabbro, Aliza	1.72 m (5 ft 8 in)
F	24	(Australia)	Drennan, Carla	1.78 m (5 ft 10 in)
F	25	(United States)	Billings, Monique	1.91 m (6 ft 3 in)
G	32	(New Zealand)	Cocks, Micaela	1.75 m (5 ft 9 in)

Head coach

- (Australia) Shannon Seebohm

Assistant coach(es)

- (Australia) Tania Baxter
- (Australia) Luke Brennan
- (Australia) Mason Rogers

Legend

- (C) Team captain
- (DP) Development player
- (I) Import player
- Injured

- Roster
Updated: 20 March 2022

== Standings ==
#	WNBL Championship ladder				
#	Team	W	L	PCT	GP
1	Melbourne Boomers	12	5	70.5	17
2	Perth Lynx	11	5	68.7	16
3	Canberra Capitals	11	6	64.7	17
4	Adelaide Lightning	10	7	58.8	17
5	Bendigo Spirit	7	9	43.7	16
6	Townsville Fire	7	10	41.1	17
7	Southside Flyers	5	12	29.4	17
8	Sydney Uni Flames	4	13	23.5	17

== Results ==
=== Regular season ===
Game	Date	Team	Score	High points	High rebounds	High assists	Location	Record
1	December; 11	@ Adelaide	70–59	Nicholson (24)	Billings (13)	Reid (7)	The Lights Community and Sports Centre	1–0
2	December; 18	Sydney	75–56	Billings (21)	Billings (9)	Nicholson, Sutton (5)	Townsville Entertainment Centre	2–0
3	December; 23	@ Southside	81–86	Billings (22)	Billings (10)	Sutton (11)	Dandenong Stadium	2–1
4	December; 31	Canberra	52–76	Reid (11)	Sutton (7)	Nicholson, Payne, Reid, Sutton (2)	Townsville Entertainment Centre	2–2
5	January; 21	@ Bendigo	77–67	Aokuso, Nicholson (15)	Payne (9)	Aokuso (4)	Bendigo Stadium	3–2
6	January; 22	@ Melbourne	68–66	Nicholson (22)	Payne (9)	Payne (4)	Melbourne Sports Centre Parkville	4–2
7	January; 28	Adelaide	65–73 (OT)	Billings (27)	Aokuso (12)	Nicholson, Reid (3)	Townsville Entertainment Centre	4–3
8	January; 30	Melbourne	59–66	Billings (14)	Billings (12)	Sutton (4)	Townsville Entertainment Centre	4–4
9	February; 6	@ Sydney	86–66	Billings (25)	Billings (8)	Sutton (5)	Qudos Bank Arena	5–4
10	February; 12	Sydney	84–63	Nicholson (23)	Aokuso (8)	Reid (7)	Townsville Entertainment Centre	6–4
11	February; 17	Bendigo	71–76	Billings (23)	Billings (12)	Reid (10)	Townsville Entertainment Centre	6–5
12	February; 19	@ Canberra	58–84	Reid (13)	Woods (7)	Nicholson (4)	National Convention Centre	6–6
13	February; 25	@ Melbourne	60–88	Woods (18)	Aokuso, Murray (5)	Reid (8)	State Basketball Centre	6–7
14	March; 5	@ Adelaide	57–78	Woods (21)	Aokuso (7)	Reid (7)	The Lights Community and Sports Centre	6–8
15	March; 13	Southside	79–100	Woods (22)	McSpadden (11)	Reid (8)	Townsville Stadium	6–9
16	March; 18	Perth	68–75	Woods (19)	Woods (11)	Reid (9)	Townsville Entertainment Centre	6–10
17	March; 20	Perth	76–69	Reid (23)	Aokuso (15)	Cocks (7)	Townsville Entertainment Centre	7–10
