= Alanna Smith =

Australian basketball player (born 1996)

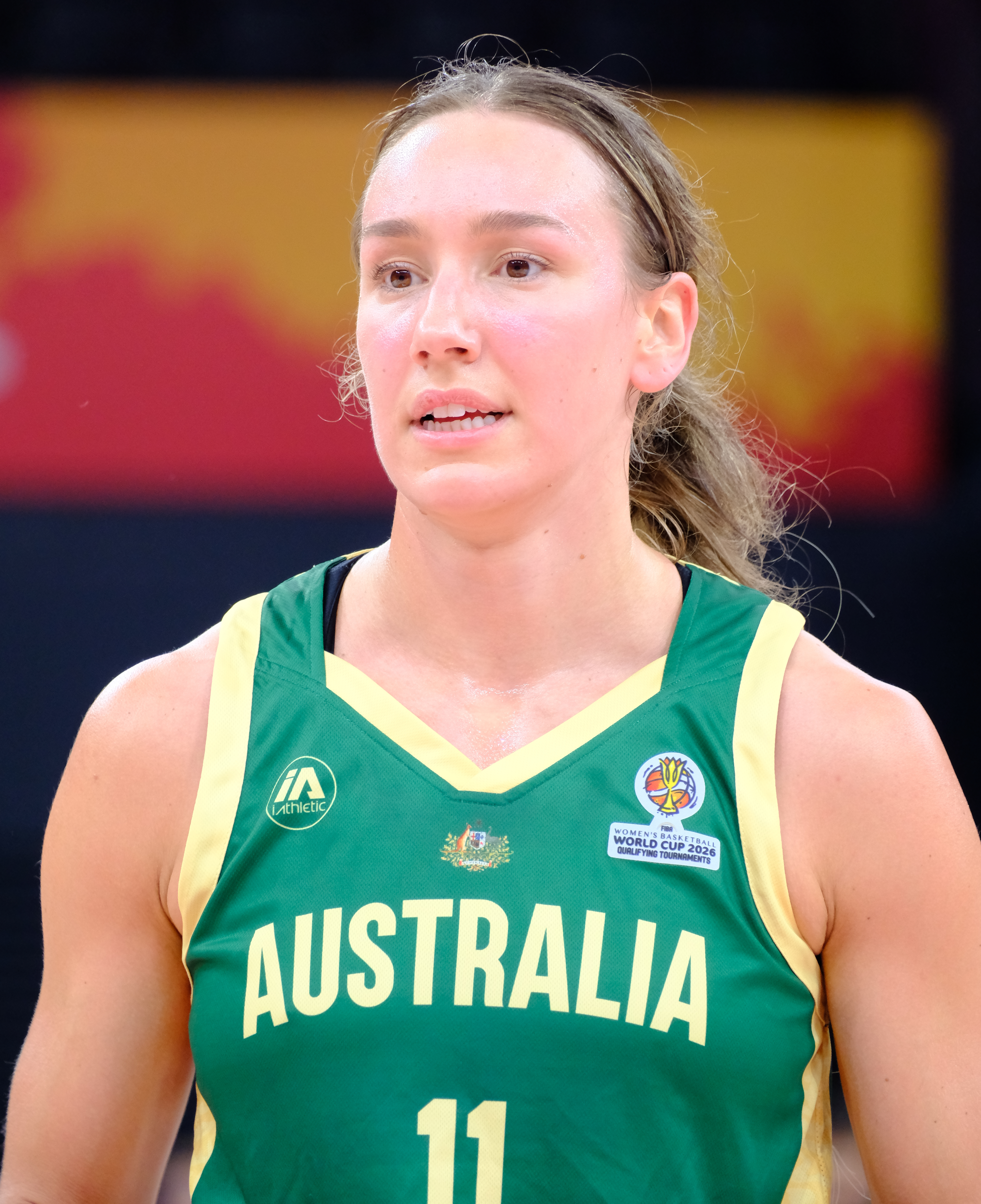
- Smith with Australia in 2026

No. 8 – Dallas Wings
- Position: Center / power forward
- League: WNBA

Personal information
- Born: 10 September 1996 (age 30) Hobart, Tasmania, Australia
- Listed height: 6 ft 4 in (1.93 m)
- Listed weight: 177 lb (80 kg)

Career information
- High school: Wesley College (Melbourne, Victoria)
- College: Stanford (2015–2019)
- WNBA draft: 2019: 1st round, 8th overall pick
- Drafted by: Phoenix Mercury
- Playing career: 2019–present

Career history
- 2019–2021: Phoenix Mercury
- 2019–2020: Incheon S-Birds
- 2021–2022: Adelaide Lightning
- 2022: Indiana Fever
- 2022: Townsville Flames
- 2022–2023: AZS AJP Gorzów Wielkopolski
- 2023: Chicago Sky
- 2023–2024: Emlak Konut
- 2024–2025: Minnesota Lynx
- 2024–2025: Shandong Six Stars
- 2026: Mist BC
- 2026–present: Dallas Wings

Career highlights
- WNBA co-Defensive Player of the Year (2025) (Note: Co-winner with A'ja Wilson); WNBA All-Defensive First Team (2025); WNBA All-Defensive Second Team (2024); WNBA Commissioner's Cup champion (2024); Unrivaled champion (2026); ALL-STAR FIVE of Paris Olympics 2024 Women's Basketball; NBL1 North champion (2022); NBL1 North Finals MVP (2022); All-WNBL Second Team (2022); Second-team All-American – AP (2019); Third-team All-American – USBWA (2019); WBCA Coaches' All-American (2019); Pac-12 Tournament MOP (2019); Pac-12 All-Defensive Team (2019); 2× All Pac-12 (2018, 2019)
- Stats at Basketball Reference
Medals
Women's basketball
Representing Australia
Olympic Games
Bronze medal – third place	2024 Paris	Team
FIBA World Cup
Silver medal – second place	2018 Spain
FIBA Asia Cup
Silver medal – second place	2017 India

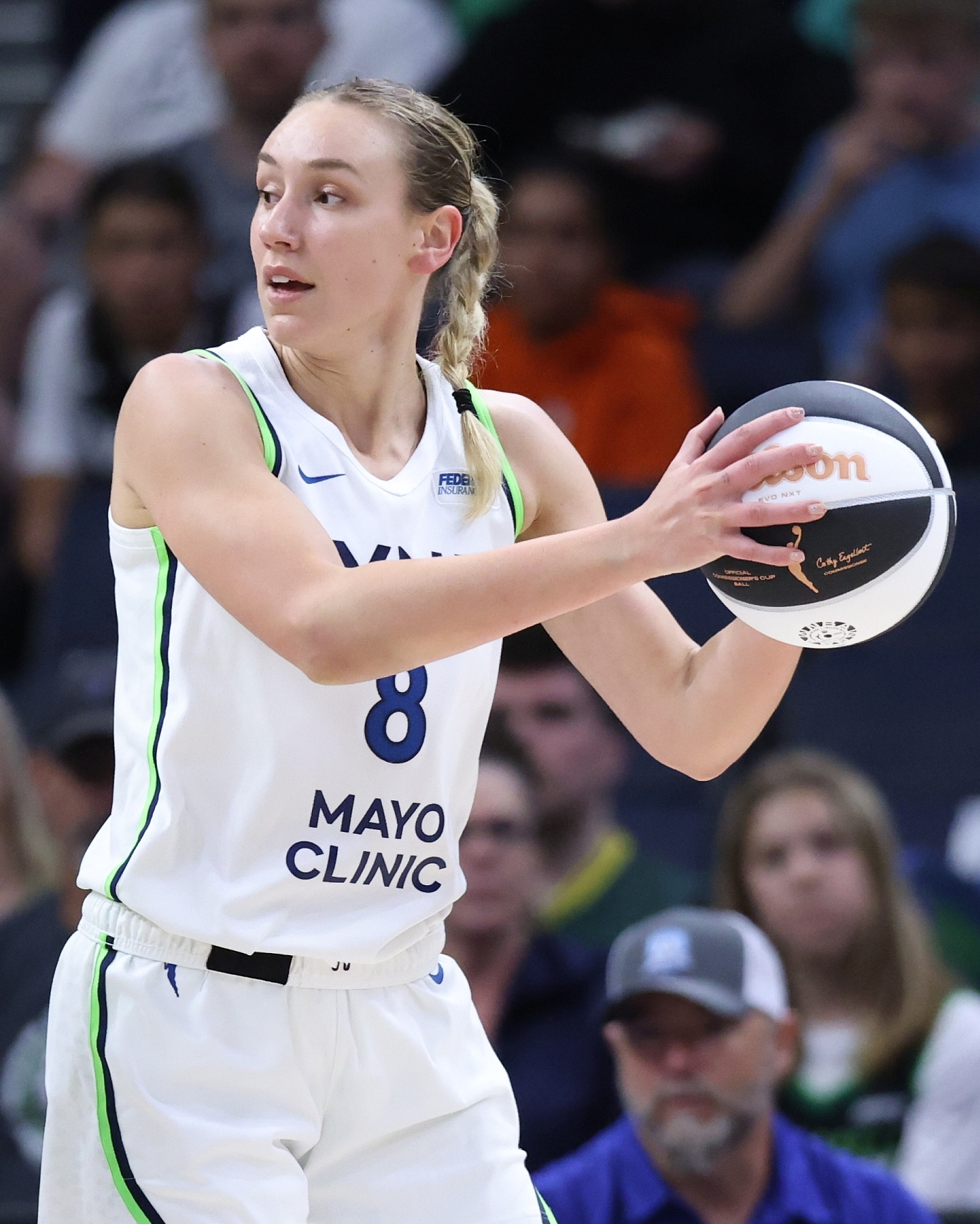
Smith with the Minnesota Lynx in 2024

Alanna Simone Smith (born 10 September 1996) is an Australian professional basketball player for the Dallas Wings of the Women's National Basketball Association (WNBA) and for the Mist of Unrivaled. She played college basketball for the Stanford Cardinal.

Smith was a member of the Australian women's basketball team (Opals) at the 2020 Tokyo Olympics, where the Opals were eliminated after losing to the USA in the quarterfinals. At the 2024 Summer Olympics she earned a bronze medal with the Australian team.

== Early life ==
Smith was born in Hobart, Tasmania. She moved to Victoria when she was young. Smith attended Wesley College in Melbourne.

== College career ==
Smith moved to the US and played four seasons of college basketball at Stanford University for the Cardinal.

=== Statistics ===
Year	Team	GP	GS	MPG	FG%	3P%	FT%	RPG	APG	SPG	BPG	TO	PPG
2015–16	Stanford	34	0	11.8	.432	.333	.659	2.4	0.4	0.1	0.7	1.2	5.3
2016–17	Stanford	38	3	19.3	.465	.317	.689	5.4	0.9	0.6	1.6	1.1	9.1
2017–18	Stanford	35	35	28.4	.474	.302	.531	7.0	1.2	1.2	1.7	2.5	13.5
2018–19	Stanford	36	36	29.2	.515	.397	.730	8.6	1.9	1.0	2.1	2.4	19.4
Career		143	74	22.3	.482	.352	.663	5.9	1.1	0.7	1.5	1.8	11.9

== Professional career ==
=== WNBA ===
==== Phoenix Mercury (2019–2021) ====
Smith was selected as the eighth overall pick of the 2019 WNBA draft by the Phoenix Mercury. After making the final roster with the Mercury, Smith played under head coach Sandy Brondello, who was also her coach in the Australian national team, and alongside the likes of Brittney Griner, DeWanna Bonner and Diana Taurasi. Smith saw limited playing time in her first season with the Mercury, averaging 7.4 minutes per game, and an ankle injury requiring surgery ended her rookie season prematurely. She saw her role slightly increasing in her second season, averaging 15.6 minutes per game. However, her playing time dropped again in her third season, and the Mercury did not re-sign her after her rookie contract expired.

==== Indiana Fever (2022) ====
On 21 February 2022, Smith signed a training camp contract with the Indiana Fever. She made the opening day roster, but played only 9 games for the team before being released.

==== Chicago Sky (2023) ====
Having a successful off-season in Poland, Smith received several offers from WNBA teams before the 2023 WNBA season. She ultimately chose the Chicago Sky after coach James Wade guaranteed her a roster spot. She hadn't been sure she wanted to return to the WNBA until Wade's offer. In her fifth season in the WNBA, Smith had her most productive season to date. She started 35 games, averaged 26.5 minutes per game, and posted career-high averages in all statistical categories. For her performance, Smith received three votes for the 2023 WNBA Most Improved Player Award.

==== Minnesota Lynx (2024–2025) ====
On 1 February 2024, Smith signed with the Minnesota Lynx. Her former Sky teammate Courtney Williams encouraged Smith to sign with the Lynx after Williams had signed on for the 2024 season. In her first season playing for the Minnesota Lynx in 2024, Smith was named to the WNBA All-Defensive Second Team, her first WNBA award. In Game 3 of the Finals, Smith's back was injured, but she continued to play in Game 4.

In the 2025 season, Smith was named WNBA Defensive Player of the Year. For the first time, two players were given the award; Smith was awarded along with A'ja Wilson. The league noted: "Anchoring the league’s top-ranked defense, Smith powered Minnesota to a league-best 97.5 defensive rating. She finished second overall in combined steals and blocks (135), ranked third in both blocks per game (1.9) and total blocks (80), and tied for 10th in total steals (55)."

==== Dallas Wings (2026–present) ====
On April 12, 2026, Smith signed a three-year contract with the Dallas Wings.

=== Unrivaled ===
On November 5, 2025, it was announced that Smith had been drafted by Mist BC for the 2026 Unrivaled season.

=== Overseas ===
In the 2019–2020 season, Smith played for Incheon S-Birds of the Women's Korean Basketball League and was named to in the All-Star team.

Smith returned home to Australia after signing with the Adelaide Lightning for the 2020 WNBL season. However, she ultimately missed the shortened season due to an ankle injury sustained in the 2020 WNBA season. Smith joined the Lightning for the 2021–22 WNBL season and was selected to the All-WNBL Second Team. Following her release by the Indiana Fever during the 2022 WNBA season, Smith returned to Australia once again and signed with the NBL1 team, the Townsville Flames, winning a championship.

In the 2022–2023 season, Smith played for AZS AJP Gorzów Wielkopolski of the Basket Liga Kobiet. Smith was named the MVP of the league.

In the 2023–2024 season, Smith played for Emlak Konut of the Turkish Super League.

Smith played for the Shandong Six Stars in the WCBA during the 2024–2025 season.

== National team career ==
=== Youth level ===
Smith made her international debut for the Sapphires at the 2011 FIBA Oceania Under-16 Championship in Canberra. Smith represented the Sapphires at the Under-17 World Championship in the Netherlands the following year, where they finished in fifth place. Smith then made her debut for the Gems at the 2014 FIBA Oceania Under-18 Championship in Fiji. Smith represented the Gems at the Under-19 World Championship in Russia the following year, where they finished in third place and took home the bronze medal. She also earned a spot on the All-Tournament Team, awarded to the five strongest players of the tournament.

=== Senior level ===
At age 20, Smith was selected to the Opals team that competed in the 2017 FIBA Women's Asia Cup in India. She made an immediate impact, averaging 10.8 points and 5.3 rebounds (2nd and 3rd highest for the team, respectively) in 14.5 minutes per game, helping Australia finish the tournament as runners-up and qualify for the World Cup the following year. Her best game was the quarter-final, in which she amassed 20 points and 9 rebounds in just 15 minutes of court time. In 2018, Smith represented the Opals in her first major international tournament—the 2018 FIBA Women's Basketball World Cup, held in Tenerife, Spain. She averaged 14.4 minutes of court time for 6.3 points and 2.3 rebounds per game, with her best game yielding 10 points and 5 rebounds (vs Argentina). She also scored 10 points in the final vs USA.

==== 2020 Tokyo Olympics ====
Smith, like all the other members of the 2020 Tokyo Olympics Opals women's basketball team, had a difficult tournament. The Opals lost their first two group stage matches. They looked flat against Belgium and then lost to China in heartbreaking circumstances. In their last group match the Opals needed to beat Puerto Rico by 25 or more in their final match to progress. This they did by 27 in a very exciting match. However, they lost to the United States in their quarterfinal 79 to 55.

==== 2024 Paris Olympics ====
Smith was again named to the Opals women's basketball team for the 2024 Paris Olympics. She was named to the FIBA All-Star Five of the games for women's basketball for her role in the team's bronze medal performance. Smith put up a double double in the bronze-winning game against Belgium with 13 points and 12 rebounds. Australia beat Belgium 85-81 to return to the medal podium for the first time since their performance in the 2012 Olympics games in London.

== WNBA career statistics ==
Legend
GP	Games played	GS	Games started	MPG	Minutes per game	RPG	Rebounds per game
APG	Assists per game	SPG	Steals per game	BPG	Blocks per game	PPG	Points per game
TO	Turnovers per game	FG%	Field-goal percentage	3P%	3-point field-goal percentage	FT%	Free-throw percentage
**Bold**	Career best	°	League leader

=== Regular season ===
Stats current through end of 2026 season

WNBA regular season statistics
Year	Team	GP	GS	MPG	FG%	3P%	FT%	RPG	APG	SPG	BPG	TO	PPG
2019	Phoenix	18	0	7.4	.195	.111	.500	1.9	0.2	0.3	0.3	0.4	1.1
2020	Phoenix	19	0	15.6	.422	.233	.690	3.6	1.2	0.3	0.8	1.0	6.1
2021	Phoenix	18	0	6.5	.235	.190	.250	1.3	0.6	0.4	0.3	**0.3**	1.2
2022	Indiana	9	1	12.9	.333	.240	.714	2.7	0.6	0.9	0.7	0.9	4.3
2023	Chicago	38	35	**26.5**	**.498**	.294	.679	**6.6**	1.8	1.3	1.3	1.5	9.2
2024	Minnesota	39	39	**26.5**	.471	**.398**	**.750**	5.6	**3.2**	**1.4**	1.5	1.9	**10.1**
2025	Minnesota	**42**	**42**	**26.5**	.485	.329	.477	5.1	2.9	1.3	**1.9**	1.5	9.6
2026	Dallas	32	18	17.9	.457	.261	.676	3.9	1.0	.7	.5	1.2	6.0
**Career**	8 years, 5 teams	215	135	20.4	.455	.305	.646	4.5	1.8	1.0	1.1	1.3	7.1

=== Playoffs ===
WNBA playoff statistics
Year	Team	GP	GS	MPG	FG%	3P%	FT%	RPG	APG	SPG	BPG	TO	PPG
2020	Phoenix	2	0	8.0	.250	**.500**	**1.000**	1.0	0.0	**0.5**	0.5	1.0	2.5
2021	Phoenix	5	0	5.2	.400	.400	**1.000**	2.0	0.2	0.2	0.2	**0.4**	3.2
2023	Chicago	2	2	18.0	.300	.000	**1.000**	4.5	0.5	0.0	1.0	1.5	4.0
2024	Minnesota	**12**°	**12**°	**28.4**	**.520**	.412	.700	**5.3**	**2.8**	**1.2**	**1.7**	1.8	**8.8**
2025	Minnesota	6	6	23.5	.441	.118	.571	5.2	2.0	1.0	1.5	1.5	6.0
**Career**	5 years, 3 teams	27	20	20.7	.464	.306	.727	4.3	1.8	0.9	1.2	1.4	6.3

== Personal life ==
As of 2024, Smith was studying toward a master's degree in psychology at Monash University.
