= Tess Madgen =

Australian basketball player (born 1990)

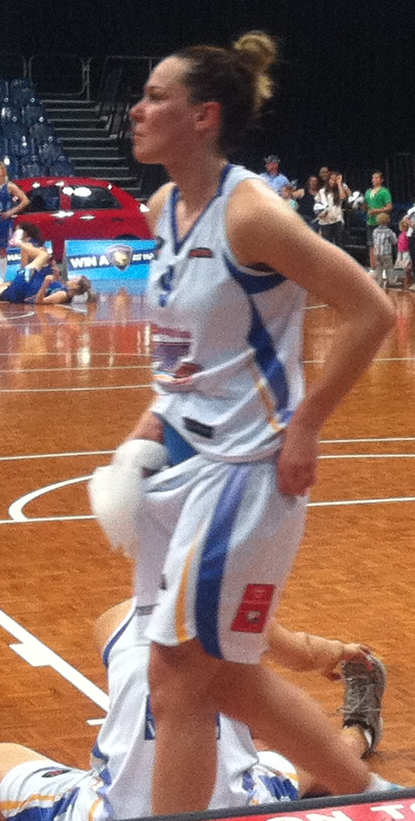
- Madgen playing for the Bendigo Spirit

Personal information
- Born: 12 August 1990 (age 36) Barossa Valley, South Australia, Australia
- Listed height: 5 ft 11 in (1.80 m)
- Listed weight: 160 lb (73 kg)

Career information
- Playing career: 2008–2024
- Position: Guard

Career history
- 2008–2010: Australian Institute of Sport
- 2010–2012: Bendigo Spirit
- 2012–2016: Melbourne Boomers
- 2015: Phoenix Mercury
- 2016–2017: AZS UMCS Lublin
- 2018–2020: Townsville Fire
- 2020–2023: Melbourne Boomers
- 2023: Northern Kāhu
- 2023–2024: Sydney Flames

Career highlights
- TBA champion (2023); All-WNBL First Team (2015); All-WNBL Second Team (2020)
- Stats at Basketball Reference
Medals
Women's basketball
Representing Australia
Olympic Games
Bronze medal – third place	2024 Paris	Team
FIBA World Cup
Silver medal – second place	2018 Spain
Bronze medal – third place	2022 Australia
Asia Cup
Bronze medal – third place	2023 Australia

Tess Madgen (born 12 August 1990) is an Australian former professional basketball player. She played 14 seasons in the Women's National Basketball League (WNBL).

Madgen was a member of the Australian Opals. She played at the 2020 Tokyo Olympics and at the 2024 Summer Olympics, where she won bronze.

== Personal life ==
Madgen was born 12 August 1990 in Barossa Valley, South Australia, where she lived while growing up. Madgen played junior basketball starting in Under 10s for the Barossa Bulldogs in the Barossa Valley Basketball Association. She represented the BAVBA as a development player in the BASA Under 12 Division 3. This team went undefeated in 1999. She then played for Eastern Mavericks. She has been affiliated with the South Australian Institute of Sport. She competed at the 2004 and 2005 Australian U16 Championships, playing for South Australia Country. She competed at the 2006 and 2007 Australian U18 Championships, playing for South Australia Country. In 2007, she played for Barossa Valley. She competed at the 2007 and 2008 Australian U18 Championships, playing for South Australia Country. In 2008, her team finished first, beating Victoria 99–61 for one of the biggest wins ever in the competition's history. As a competitor at the 2009 Australian Under-20 national championships, she won the Bob Staunton Award while her team took home silver.

She is the sister of former South East Melbourne Phoenix and Boomers guard Ben Madgen and Collingwood Magpies player Jack Madgen.

In 2011, she was attending the University of South Australia.

== Professional career ==
Madgen played guard and forward and was an offensive player. Madgen is 180 centimetres (71 in) tall.

In 2008, she was featured as a basketball star on myFiba. She was featured in the WNBL's 2009 league calendar.

=== WNBL ===
Madgen had a scholarship with the Australian Institute of Sport in 2008 and 2009. She played with the AIS team in the 2008/2009 and 2009/2010 WNBL seasons. She was one of three South Australians on the team. In a November 2008 90–62 loss to the Adelaide Lightning, she scored few points. In a November 2009 game against the Adelaide Lightning which her side lost 77–100, she had 15 points and 13 rebounds. In a 101–49 loss for her team to the Sydney Uni Flames, she scored 11 points.

Madgen joined the Bendigo Spirit for the 2010/2011 season where she averaged 16 points a game in the regular season and finished third in the league in this category. She finished fifth in the league for 3-point shooting percentage at 36% in the regular season. She had 125 total rebounds in the season. According to teammate and team General Manager Kirsti Harrower, Madgen learned to become a team player in her first season with the club. Three weeks into the season, she was named the league's player of the week. In the third round in a game against the Australian Institute of Sport at the AIS Basketball and Netball Training Hall, she scored 28 points, with a field goal percentage of 75%. She also had four steals in the game. In a November 2010 game against the Adelaide Lightning, she scored 25 points 7 rebounds in a 91–79 win for the Spirit. She was named the club's most valuable player at the end of the season.

Madgen resigned with the team for the 2011/2012 season in June 2011 and was with Bengido in the 2011/2012 season. She was named the club's Most Valuable Player. In January 2012, she made a clutch shot for her team that helped them beat Canberra. In the Canberra game, she scored 14 points. Spirit coach Bernie Harrower said of efforts to re-sign her: "There's no doubt about that. She's probably on most people's shopping list. She is very unlucky to miss out on the Opals squad this year and she's been able to do that by playing with us. For her to play in Bendigo she's not playing behind anyone else, she's the superstar of our team. If she goes to Bulleen there's certainly people ahead of her there, and she then has to take a step backwards. You do what you can to keep your players and if they're not happy playing with you and want to move on, well there's not much you can do about that. She's certainly a required player for us and someone we desperately want to keep." She did not resign with Bendigo for the 2012/2013 season. Bulleen was believed to have been trying to recruit her to play for them as some of their players had played with Madgen on the Australian Institute of Sport team, including Liz Cambage and Rachel Jarry.

=== TBA ===
In 2023, Madgen helped the Northern Kāhu win the Tauihi Basketball Aotearoa championship.

== National team career ==
Madgen made her international debut in 2008 with the Australian junior team, earning a gold medal with them at the Oceania World Qualification series. That year, she was also part of the junior national team that won a silver medal at the William Jones Cup in Taiwan. In 2009, she was a member of the Australian junior women's team that competed at the World Championships in Thailand. She has also represented Australia at the 2011 Summer Universiade in Shenzhen, China in August, where Australia took home a bronze medal, beating 66–56 in the bronze medal match. The quarter final victory over Canada, she scored 14 points. She also scored eight points in games against Japan and the Czech Republic. She was selected for the team in June 2011.

Madgen was named to the 2011 Opals squad and made her national team debut in 2011 as a member of the team in the lead up to the 2011 FIBA Oceania Championships, playing in the Olympic qualification series against New Zealand women's national basketball team. In the series, she played 22 minutes off the bench in game two, scored nine points and had 5 rebounds. She earned a gold medal in the 2011 FIBA Oceania Championship. She was selected for the squad to compete at the 2011 Chinese hosted Women's 4 Nations Tournament. In late July 2011, she played in a three-game test series against China played in Queensland. She was the youngest player on the squad. She was named to the 2012 Australia women's national basketball team.

Madgen, like all the other members of the 2020 Tokyo Olympics Opals women's basketball team, had a difficult tournament. The Opals lost their first two group stage matches. They looked flat against Belgium and then lost to China in heartbreaking circumstances. In their last group match the Opals needed to beat Puerto Rico by 25 or more in their final match to progress. This they did by 27 in a very exciting match. However, they lost to the United States in their quarterfinal 79 to 55.

== Coaching career ==
In October 2025, Madgen was named head coach of the Bendigo Braves women's team in the NBL1 South on a two-year deal.

== Executive career ==
On 26 March 2026, Madgen was appointed by the Adelaide Lightning as General Manager of Basketball.

== Career statistics ==
Legend
GP	Games played	GS	Games started	MPG	Minutes per game	RPG	Rebounds per game
APG	Assists per game	SPG	Steals per game	BPG	Blocks per game	PPG	Points per game
TO	Turnovers per game	FG%	Field-goal percentage	3P%	3-point field-goal percentage	FT%	Free-throw percentage
**Bold**	Career best	°	League leader

=== WNBA ===
WNBA regular season statistics
Year	Team	GP	GS	MPG	FG%	3P%	FT%	RPG	APG	SPG	BPG	TO	PPG
2015	Phoenix	8	0	7.4	.375	.600	.500	0.8	0.3	0.8	0.3	0.5	1.3
**Career**	1 year, 1 team	8	0	7.4	.375	.600	.500	0.8	0.3	0.8	0.3	0.5	1.3

== See also ==
- List of Australian WNBA players
