= Lindsay Allen =

American basketball player (born 1995)

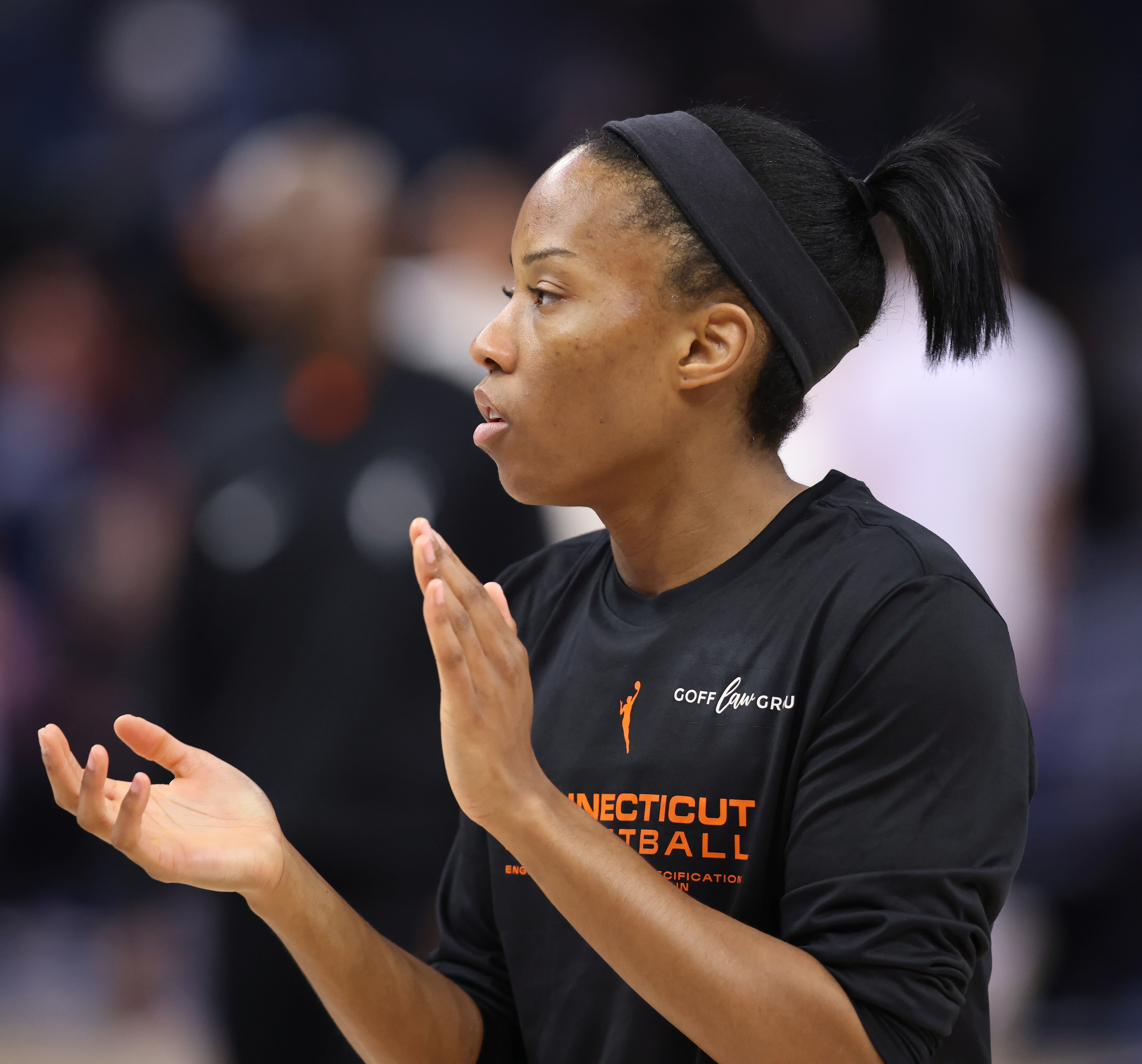
- Allen with the Connecticut Sun in 2025

Personal information
- Born: March 20, 1995 (age 31) Clinton, Maryland, U.S.
- Listed height: 5 ft 8 in (1.73 m)
- Listed weight: 145 lb (66 kg)

Career information
- High school: St. John's College HS (Washington, D.C.)
- College: Notre Dame (2013–2017)
- WNBA draft: 2017: 2nd round, 14th overall pick
- Drafted by: New York Liberty
- Playing career: 2017–present
- Position: Point guard

Career history
- 2017: New York Liberty
- 2018–2020: Las Vegas Aces
- 2018–2020: Melbourne Boomers
- 2021: Indiana Fever
- 2021–2022: Melbourne Boomers
- 2022–2023: Minnesota Lynx
- 2022–2023: AZS AJP Gorzów Wielkopolski
- 2023–2025: Botaş SK
- 2024: Chicago Sky
- 2025: Connecticut Sun
- 2025–2026: Shandong Six Stars
- 2026: Çukurova Basketbol

Career highlights
- As player: EuroCup champion (2026); WNBL champion (2022); WNBL Finals MVP (2022); All-WNBL Second Team (2022); Third-team All-American – AP (2017); ACC Tournament MVP (2017); 2× First-team All-ACC (2016, 2017); McDonald's All-American (2013)
- Stats at WNBA.com
- Stats at Basketball Reference
Medals
Women's basketball
Representing the United States
FIBA Under-17 World Cup
Gold medal – first place	2012 Netherlands	Team

Lindsay Wilson Dozier Allen (born March 20, 1995) is an American professional basketball player. She played college basketball for the Notre Dame Fighting Irish. She was drafted in the second round (14th overall) of the 2017 WNBA draft by the New York Liberty.

== Early life ==
Allen was born on March 20, 1995, in Clinton, Maryland.

Allen ended her collegiate career as the all-time assist leader at Notre Dame and in the ACC, and with the most consecutive starts in Notre Dame history.

== Professional career ==
Allen was drafted early in the second round by the New York Liberty but she was the final cut as the Liberty cut down their roster to the limit. Because she was cut, she was able to finish her final week of college and participate in the graduation ceremonies. Before she could even unpack she got a call from the Liberty asking her to return to the team. Brittany Boyd had sustained an injury and would be out for the season. Bill Laimbeer, the Liberty coach, was surprised that Allen hadn't been claimed by another team so was happy to have her back on the team.

Allen signed to play with Dynamo Moscow for the 2017–18 season.

Allen has also played in the Australian Women's National Basketball League, playing with the Melbourne Boomers for three seasons. She was part of the Boomers' 2022 championship-winning team, winning the Rachael Sporn Medal as most valuable player of the Finals series.

On July 21, 2022, Allen signed a 7-day contract with the Minnesota Lynx. She proceeded to sign two more 7-day contracts with the team.

Allen re-signed with the Lynx for the 2023 season.

On February 1, 2024, Allen signed a two-year contract with the Chicago Sky.

On February 4, 2025, Allen and reserved rights to Nikolina Milić were traded to the Connecticut Sun in exchange for Rebecca Allen.

== Career statistics ==
Legend
GP	Games played	GS	Games started	MPG	Minutes per game	RPG	Rebounds per game
APG	Assists per game	SPG	Steals per game	BPG	Blocks per game	PPG	Points per game
TO	Turnovers per game	FG%	Field-goal percentage	3P%	3-point field-goal percentage	FT%	Free-throw percentage
**Bold**	Career best	°	League leader

=== WNBA ===
==== Regular season ====
Stats current through end of 2025 regular season

WNBA regular season statistics
Year	Team	GP	GS	MPG	FG%	3P%	FT%	RPG	APG	SPG	BPG	TO	PPG
2017	New York	28	0	13.4	.371	.000	.700	1.5	2.2	0.6	0.0	**0.7**	1.9
2018	Las Vegas	24	6	14.9	.384	.063	.708	1.3	2.9	0.6	0.0	0.9	3.1
2019	Did not play due to injury												
2020	Las Vegas	21	21	13.5	.424	.353	.800	1.1	2.4	0.3	0.0	0.8	3.3
2021	Indiana	32	8	17.8	.428	.298	.811	1.5	3.0	0.5	0.1	1.0	5.4
2022	Minnesota	9	0	14.9	**.526**	**.571**	**.923**	1.6	3.4	0.2	0.0	0.8	**6.7**
2023	Minnesota	29	20	**24.1**	.399	.206	.792	**2.4**	**4.5**	0.6	0.1	1.3	6.2
2024	Chicago	**40**	**28**	23.8	.466	.292	.808	2.0	3.9	**0.8**	**0.2**	1.6	6.6
2025	Connecticut	31	9	14.5	.400	.167	.826	1.0	2.0	0.3	**0.2**	1.0	2.4
**Career**	8 years, 6 teams	214	92	17.9	.426	.255	.797	1.6	3.1	0.5	0.1	1.1	4.4

==== Playoffs ====
WNBA playoff statistics
Year	Team	GP	GS	MPG	FG%	3P%	FT%	RPG	APG	SPG	BPG	TO	PPG
2017	New York	1	0	5.0	.000	.000	.000	**1.0**	**3.0**	0.0	0.0	0.0	0.0
2020	Las Vegas	**5**	**1**	**6.4**	**.333**	.000	.000	0.2	0.4	**0.2**	**0.2**	1.2	**1.2**
**Career**	2 years, 2 teams	6	1	6.2	.333	.000	.000	0.3	0.8	0.2	0.2	1.0	1.0

=== College ===
NCAA statistics
Year	Team	GP	GS	MPG	FG%	3P%	FT%	RPG	APG	SPG	BPG	TO	PPG
2013–14	Notre Dame	38	**38**	26.8	.497	.357	.815	2.4	3.9	1.3	**0.2**	1.8	6.2
2014–15	Notre Dame	**39**	**38**	31.1	**.522**	.370	**.854**	3.5	5.3	1.3	0.1	**2.5**	**10.4**
2015–16	Notre Dame	35	35	29.9	.498	.267	.714	3.7	5.8	1.3	0.1	2.3	9.3
2016–17	Notre Dame	37	37	**34.6**	.495	**.381**	.742	**5.3**	**7.6**	**2.2**	0.1	2.1	9.6
**Career**		149	148	30.6	.504	.347	.780	3.7	5.6	1.5	0.1	2.2	8.9
