= 2020 Bendigo Spirit season =

2020–21 Bendigo Spirit season
- Head Coach: Tracy York
- Captain: Tessa Lavey
- Venue: Bendigo Stadium

Results
- Record: 0–13
- Ladder: 8th
- Finals: Did not qualify

Leaders
- Points: Lavey (15.2)
- Rebounds: Ernst (7.5)
- Assists: Lavey (5.9)

The 2020 Bendigo Spirit season is the 14th season for the franchise in the Women's National Basketball League (WNBL).

Ahead of the 2020 season, the Spirit announced that local property development company, Villawood Properties, would serve as naming rights partners after signing a two-year deal in September 2020. Their leadership team for the season was announced with Tessa Lavey as captain, alongside Carley Ernst and Amelia Todhunter as co-vice captains.

Due to the COVID-19 pandemic, a North Queensland hub is set to host the season. The season was originally 2020–21 and would be traditionally played over several months across the summer, however this seasons scheduling has been condensed. The six-week season will see Townsville, Cairns and Mackay host a 56-game regular season fixture, plus a four-game final series (2 x semi-finals, preliminary final and grand final). Each team will contest 14 games starting on 12 November, with the grand final scheduled for 20 December.

== Roster ==
2020 Bendigo Spirit roster
Players
Coaches

| Pos. | No. | Nat. | Name | Ht. |
|---|---|---|---|---|
| F | 2 | (New Zealand) | Goulding, Mary | 1.83 m (6 ft 0 in) |
| G | 4 | (Australia) | Todhunter, Amelia | 1.69 m (5 ft 7 in) |
| G | 5 | (Australia) | Britten, Shelby | 1.63 m (5 ft 4 in) |
| G | 6 | (Australia) | McLean, Cassidy | 1.78 m (5 ft 10 in) |
| F | 9 | (Australia) | Froling, Alicia | 1.90 m (6 ft 3 in) |
| G/F | 15 | (New Zealand) | Paalvast, Chevannah | 1.80 m (5 ft 11 in) |
| F/C | 16 | (Australia) | Dunlop, Piper | 1.88 m (6 ft 2 in) |
| F | 18 | (Australia) | Ernst, Carley | 1.96 m (6 ft 5 in) |
| G | 21 | (Australia) | Price, Paige | 1.88 m (6 ft 2 in) |
| F | 23 | (Australia) | Skinner, Demi | 1.90 m (6 ft 3 in) |
| G | 24 | (Australia) | Lavey, Tessa (C) | 1.72 m (5 ft 8 in) |
| F/C | 31 | (Australia) | Rintala, Jennie | 1.88 m (6 ft 2 in) |

Head coach

- (Australia) Tracy York

Assistant coach(es)

- (Australia) Mark Alabakov

Legend

- (C) Team captain
- (DP) Development player
- (I) Import player
- Injured

- Roster
Updated: 13 November 2020

== Standings ==
| # | WNBL Championship ladder | | | | |
| # | Team | W | L | PCT | GP |
|---|---|---|---|---|---|
| 1 | Southside Flyers | 11 | 2 | 84.6 | 13 |
| 2 | Townsville Fire | 9 | 4 | 69.2 | 13 |
| 3 | Canberra Capitals | 9 | 4 | 69.2 | 13 |
| 4 | Melbourne Boomers | 9 | 4 | 69.2 | 13 |
| 5 | Sydney Uni Flames | 5 | 8 | 38.5 | 13 |
| 6 | Adelaide Lightning | 5 | 8 | 38.5 | 13 |
| 7 | Perth Lynx | 4 | 9 | 30.8 | 13 |
| 8 | Bendigo Spirit | 0 | 13 | 0.0 | 13 |

== Results ==
=== Regular season ===
| Game | Date | Team | Score | High points | High rebounds | High assists | Location | Record |
|---|---|---|---|---|---|---|---|---|
| 1 | November; 12 | Southside | 60–102 | Ernst (16) | Froling (11) | Lavey (3) | Townsville Stadium | 0–1 |
| 2 | November; 14 | Sydney | 63–100 | Lavey (15) | Goulding, Lavey (6) | Lavey (10) | Townsville Stadium | 0–2 |
| 3 | November; 16 | Canberra | 56–76 | Ernst (15) | Ernst (10) | Lavey, Todhunter (3) | Mackay Multisports Stadium | 0–3 |
| 4 | November; 18 | Perth | 65–78 | Ernst (28) | Ernst (10) | Lavey (9) | Mackay Multisports Stadium | 0–4 |
| 5 | November; 21 | Townsville | 81–91 | Goulding, Lavey (19) | Ernst (8) | Lavey (11) | Townsville Stadium | 0–5 |
| 6 | November; 24 | Townsville | 51–99 | Goulding, Rintala (10) | Ernst (6) | Todhunter (4) | Townsville Stadium | 0–6 |
| 7 | November; 25 | Adelaide | 83–89 | Lavey (33) | Ernst (10) | Lavey (6) | Townsville Stadium | 0–7 |
| 8 | November; 28 | Canberra | 51–87 | Lavey (17) | Price (5) | Lavey (4) | Townsville Stadium | 0–8 |
| 9 | December; 1 | Perth | 79–95 | Lavey (23) | Ernst (8) | Ernst, Lavey (5) | Townsville Stadium | 0–9 |
| 10 | December; 5 | Melbourne | 52–84 | Ernst (8) | Ernst (7) | Froling, McLean, Paalvast, Rintala (2) | Cairns Pop-Up Arena | 0–10 |
| 11 | December; 6 | Sydney | 54–62 | Lavey (17) | Ernst (7) | Lavey (6) | Cairns Pop-Up Arena | 0–11 |
| 12 | December; 9 | Adelaide | 59–69 | Ernst (32) | Ernst (15) | Lavey (6) | Cairns Pop-Up Arena | 0–12 |
| 13 | December; 11 | Melbourne | 70–91 | Lavey (16) | Lavey (9) | Lavey (10) | Cairns Pop-Up Arena | 0–13 |
