= List of 2020–21 EuroLeague transactions =

This is a list of all personnel changes for the 2020 EuroLeague off-season and 2020–21 EuroLeague season.

== Retirements ==
The following players who played in the 2019–20 Euroleague, and played more than three EuroLeague seasons, retired.

Date	Name	EuroLeague Team(s) and played (years)	Age	Notes	Ref.

== Managerial changes ==
=== Managerial changes ===
Team	Outgoing manager	Manner of departure	Date of vacancy	Position in table	Replaced with	Date of appointment
(Greece) Panathinaikos	(United States) Rick Pitino	Mutual consent	20 March 2020	Pre-season	(Greece) Georgios Vovoras	17 June 2020
(France) ASVEL	(Montenegro) Zvezdan Mitrović	Sacked	21 May 2020	Pre-season	(France) T. J. Parker	17 June 2020
(Serbia) Crvena zvezda	(Serbia) (Greece) Dragan Šakota	Mutual consent	8 June 2020	Pre-season	(Serbia) Saša Obradović	10 June 2020
(Turkey) Fenerbahçe	(Serbia) Željko Obradović	Mutual consent	23 June 2020	Pre-season	(Serbia) Igor Kokoškov	4 July 2020
(Spain) Barcelona	(Serbia) Svetislav Pešić	Mutual consent	1 July 2020	Pre-season	(Lithuania) Šarūnas Jasikevičius	2 July 2020
(Lithuania) Žalgiris	(Lithuania) Šarūnas Jasikevičius	Signed by Barcelona	2 July 2020	Pre-season	(Austria) Martin Schiller	14 July 2020
(Germany) Bayern Munich	(Serbia) Oliver Kostić	Mutual consent	15 July 2020	Pre-season	(Italy) Andrea Trinchieri	15 July 2020
(Serbia) Crvena zvezda	(Serbia) Saša Obradović	Sacked	24 December 2020	17th (5-11)	(Montenegro) Dejan Radonjić	25 December 2020
(Greece) Panathinaikos	(Greece) Georgios Vovoras	Sacked	4 January 2021	16th (5-11)	(Greece) Kostas Charalampidis (interim)	4 January 2021
(Greece) Panathinaikos	(Greece) Kostas Charalampidis	End of caretaker spell	14 January 2021	15th (6-12)	(Israel) Oded Kattash	14 January 2021
(Russia) Khimki	(Lithuania) Rimas Kurtinaitis	Sacked	15 January 2021	18th (2-18)	(Russia) Andrey Maltsev (interim)	15 January 2021

== Player movements ==
=== Between two EuroLeague teams ===
Date	Player	From	To	Contract years	Ref.
June 2	(Serbia) Nikola Milutinov	(Greece) Olympiacos	(Russia) CSKA Moscow	3	
June 2	(United States) Malcolm Delaney	(Spain) Barcelona	(Italy) AX Olimpia Milan	2	
June 2	(United States) Kyle Hines	(Russia) CSKA Moscow	(Italy) AX Olimpia Milan	2	
June 18	(United States) Kevin Punter	(Serbia) Crvena zvezda	(Italy) AX Olimpia Milan	1	
June 30	(Italy) Luigi Datome	(Turkey) Fenerbahçe	(Italy) AX Olimpia Milan	3	
July 1	(France) Livio Jean-Charles	(France) ASVEL	(Greece) Olympiacos	2	
July 1	(United States) Jordan Loyd	(Spain) Valencia	(Serbia) Crvena zvezda	1	
July 4	(Lithuania) Rokas Giedraitis	(Germany) Alba Berlin	(Spain) Baskonia	3	
July 4	(Slovenia) Klemen Prepelič	(Spain) Real Madrid	(Spain) Valencia	2+1	
July 6	(Serbia) Charles Jenkins	(Serbia) Crvena zvezda	(Greece) Olympiacos	2	
July 6	(Canada) Kevin Pangos	(Spain) Barcelona	(Russia) Zenit	1	
July 8	(United States) Derrick Williams	(Turkey) Fenerbahçe	(Spain) Valencia	1	
July 9	(Greece) Nick Calathes	(Greece) Panathinaikos	(Spain) Barcelona	3	
July 9	(Georgia (country)) Tornike Shengelia	(Spain) Baskonia	(Russia) CSKA Moscow	3	
July 9	(Denmark) Shavon Shields	(Spain) Baskonia	(Italy) AX Olimpia Milan	2	
July 9	(Lithuania) Edgaras Ulanovas	(Lithuania) Žalgiris	(Turkey) Fenerbahçe	2	
July 10	(Lithuania) Artūras Gudaitis	(Italy) AX Olimpia Milan	(Russia) Zenit	2	
July 10	(Iceland) Martin Hermannsson	(Germany) Alba Berlin	(Spain) Valencia	2	
July 10	(United States) Alec Peters	(Turkey) Anadolu Efes	(Spain) Baskonia	2	
July 11	(Nigeria) Tonye Jekiri	(France) ASVEL	(Spain) Baskonia	2	
July 13	(Germany) Danilo Barthel	(Germany) Bayern Munich	(Turkey) Fenerbahçe	2	
July 13	(United States) Zach LeDay	(Lithuania) Žalgiris	(Italy) AX Olimpia Milan	2	
July 13	(Serbia) Nemanja Nedović	(Italy) AX Olimpia Milan	(Greece) Panathinaikos	1	
July 14	(United States) Lorenzo Brown	(Serbia) Crvena zvezda	(Turkey) Fenerbahçe	1	
July 14	(France) Joffrey Lauvergne	(Turkey) Fenerbahçe	(Lithuania) Žalgiris	1	
July 15	(United States) Billy Baron	(Serbia) Crvena zvezda	(Russia) Zenit	2	
July 15	(United States) Augustine Rubit	(Greece) Olympiacos	(Lithuania) Žalgiris	1+1	
July 17	(United States) K.C. Rivers	(Lithuania) Žalgiris	(Russia) Zenit	1	
July 17	(Russia) Evgeny Voronov	(Russia) Zenit	(Russia) Khimki	1+1	
July 18	(Serbia) Nikola Kalinić	(Turkey) Fenerbahçe	(Spain) Valencia	1	
July 21	(Spain) Alberto Abalde	(Spain) Valencia	(Spain) Real Madrid	5	
July 21	(United States) Jordan Mickey	(Spain) Real Madrid	(Russia) Khimki	1	
July 21	(Cuba) Howard Sant-Roos	(Russia) CSKA Moscow	(Greece) Panathinaikos	1+1	
July 22	(Germany) Maodo Lô	(Germany) Bayern Munich	(Germany) Alba Berlin	1	
July 24	(Argentina) Patricio Garino	(Spain) Baskonia	(Lithuania) Žalgiris	1+1	
July 24	(Greece) Kostas Sloukas	(Turkey) Fenerbahçe	(Greece) Olympiacos	3	
July 27	(United States) Wade Baldwin	(Greece) Olympiacos	(Germany) Bayern Munich	1	
July 28	(United States) Malcolm Thomas	(Turkey) Fenerbahçe	(Germany) Bayern Munich	1+1	
July 30	(United States) Greg Monroe	(Germany) Bayern Munich	(Russia) Khimki	1	
July 31	(United States) Jalen Reynolds	(Israel) Maccabi Tel Aviv	(Germany) Bayern Munich	1	
August 2	(Uruguay) Jayson Granger	(Spain) Baskonia	(Germany) Alba Berlin	1	
December 3	(United States) James Gist	(Serbia) Crvena zvezda	(Germany) Bayern Munich	1	
December 17	(Spain) Quino Colom	(Spain) Valencia	(Serbia) Crvena zvezda	2	
January 6	(France) Léo Westermann	(Turkey) Fenerbahçe	(Spain) Barcelona	2	
January 14	(United States) Tarik Black	(Israel) Maccabi Tel Aviv	(Russia) Zenit	1	
February 3	(Russia) Anton Ponkrashov	(Russia) Zenit	(Russia) Khimki	1	
February 20	(Greece) Kostas Koufos	(Russia) CSKA Moscow	(Greece) Olympiacos	1	
February 24	(United States) Jeremy Evans	(Russia) Khimki	(Italy) AX Olimpia Milan	1	

=== To a EuroLeague team ===
Date	Player	From	To	Contract years	Ref.
May 26	(Italy) Davide Moretti	(United States) University of Texas Tech	(Italy) AX Olimpia Milan	5	
May 29	(France) Paul Lacombe	Monaco	(France) ASVEL	4	
June 3	(United States) Norris Cole	Monaco	(France) ASVEL	2	
June 3	(France) Moustapha Fall	(Turkey) Türk Telekom	(France) ASVEL	1	
June 3	(United States) Steve Vasturia	(Germany) Rasta Vechta	(Lithuania) Žalgiris	2+1	
June 5	(Lithuania) Tomas Dimša	(Lithuania) Lietkabelis	(Lithuania) Žalgiris	2	
June 8	(United States) Kevarrius Hayes	(Italy) Cantù	(France) ASVEL	1	
June 13	(United States) Allerik Freeman	(China) Shenzhen Aviators	(France) ASVEL	1	
June 22	(Russia) Denis Zakharov	(Russia) Enisey	(Russia) Zenit	2	
June 29	(Lithuania) Marek Blaževič	(Lithuania) Rytas	(Lithuania) Žalgiris	3	
June 30	(United States) Hassan Martin	(Montenegro) Budućnost	(Greece) Olympiacos	2	
July 2	(United States) Corey Walden	(Serbia) Partizan	(Serbia) Crvena zvezda	2	
July 4	(Greece) Giannoulis Larentzakis	(Spain) Murcia	(Greece) Olympiacos	3	
July 7	(Italy) Simone Fontecchio	(Italy) Reggio Emilia	(Germany) Alba Berlin	3	
July 8	(United States) Aaron Harrison	(Turkey) Galatasaray	(Greece) Olympiacos	2	
July 8	(Canada) Dyshawn Pierre	(Italy) Dinamo Sassari	(Turkey) Fenerbahçe	1+1	
July 9	(United States) Langston Hall	(Greece) Promitheas Patras	(Serbia) Crvena zvezda	2	
July 10	(Trinidad and Tobago) Johnny Hamilton	(Turkey) Darüşşafaka	(Turkey) Fenerbahçe	1+1	
July 10	(United States) Ben Lammers	(Spain) Bilbao	(Germany) Alba Berlin	3	
July 12	(Germany) Louis Olinde	(Germany) Brose Bamberg	(Germany) Alba Berlin	3	
July 13	(United States) Alex Poythress	(Turkey) Galatasaray	(Russia) Zenit	1	
July 13	(Serbia) Marko Simonović	(Slovenia) Cedevita Olimpija	(Serbia) Crvena zvezda	2	
July 14	(United States) Marcus Foster	(Israel) Hapoel Holon	(Greece) Panathinaikos	1+1	
July 15	(Spain) Carlos Alocén	(Spain) Zaragoza	(Spain) Real Madrid		
July 16	(France) William Howard	(United States) Houston Rockets	(France) ASVEL	2	
July 18	(Russia) Vitaly Fridzon	(Russia) Lokomotiv Kuban	(Russia) Zenit	1	
July 20	(United States) Zach Auguste	(Turkey) Galatasaray	(Greece) Panathinaikos	1+1	
July 23	(Greece) Lefteris Bochoridis	(Greece) Aris	(Greece) Panathinaikos	1	
July 27	(United States) Jarell Eddie	(Spain) Murcia	(Turkey) Fenerbahçe	1+1	
July 27	(Spain) Jaime Pradilla	(Spain) Zaragoza	(Spain) Valencia	4	
July 29	(Serbia) Aleksa Radanov	(Serbia) FMP	(Serbia) Crvena zvezda	2	
July 30	(United States) JaJuan Johnson	(Turkey) Bahçeşehir Koleji	(Germany) Bayern Munich	1	
July 30	(Serbia) Aleksa Uskoković	(Serbia) FMP	(Serbia) Crvena zvezda	4	
August 1	(Australia) Duop Reath	(Serbia) FMP	(Serbia) Crvena zvezda	1	
August 3	(United States) Nick Weiler-Babb	(Germany) Ludwigsburg	(Germany) Bayern Munich	2	
August 5	(Turkey) Kenan Sipahi	(Spain) Real Betis	(Turkey) Fenerbahçe	1	
August 6	(Turkey) Erten Gazi	(United States) Fordham University	(Turkey) Anadolu Efes	1+1	
August 6	(United States) Aaron White	(Spain) Tenerife	(Greece) Panathinaikos	1	
August 7	(Greece) Leonidas Kaselakis	(Greece) Promitheas Patras	(Greece) Panathinaikos	1	
August 9	(United States) Pierre Jackson	(United States) South Bay Lakers	(Greece) Panathinaikos	1	
August 11	(Israel) Oz Blayzer	(Israel) Maccabi Rishon LeZion	(Israel) Maccabi Tel Aviv	1	
August 16	(United States) Chris Jones	(Turkey) Bursaspor	(Israel) Maccabi Tel Aviv	1	
August 20	(Israel) Eidan Alber	(Israel) Ironi Nes Ziona	(Israel) Maccabi Tel Aviv	1	
August 25	(Croatia) Ante Žižić	(United States) Cleveland Cavaliers	(Israel) Maccabi Tel Aviv	2	
September 7	(United States) Errick McCollum	(Russia) UNICS Kazan	(Russia) Khimki	1	
September 10	(Greece) Nikos Diplaros	(Georgia (country)) Batumi	(Greece) Panathinaikos	1+1	
September 18	(United States) Emanuel Terry	(Israel) Hapoel Jerusalem	(Serbia) Crvena zvezda	1	
September 22	(United States) Max Heidegger	(United States) UC Santa Barbara	(Israel) Maccabi Tel Aviv	3	
September 27	(Croatia) Dragan Bender	(United States) Golden State Warriors	(Israel) Maccabi Tel Aviv	3 months	
October 20	(United States) Johnny O'Bryant	(Russia) Lokomotiv Kuban	(Serbia) Crvena zvezda	1	
November 21	(Mexico) Alex Pérez	(Turkey) Bahçeşehir Koleji	(Turkey) Fenerbahçe	1	
December 3	(United States) D.J. Seeley	(Spain) Zaragoza	(Germany) Bayern Munich	1	
December 18	(Serbia) Marko Gudurić	(United States) Memphis Grizzlies	(Turkey) Fenerbahçe	3	
December 18	(Greece) Lefteris Mantzoukas	(Greece) Promitheas Patras	(Greece) Panathinaikos	5	
December 18	(United States) Derrick Walton	(United States) Detroit Pistons	(France) ASVEL	1	
January 5	(Israel) Alex Tyus	(Turkey) Galatasaray	(Spain) Real Madrid	1	
January 13	(Bosnia and Herzegovina) Džanan Musa	(United States) Detroit Pistons	(Turkey) Anadolu Efes	3	
January 20	(United States) Kyle O'Quinn	(United States) Philadelphia 76ers	(Turkey) Fenerbahçe	1	
January 24	(United States) T.J. Cline	(Italy) Brescia	(Israel) Maccabi Tel Aviv	1+1	
February 10	(Nigeria) Micheal Eric	(Turkey) Türk Telekom	(Russia) CSKA Moscow	1	
February 15	(Denmark) Gabriel Lundberg	(Poland) Zielona Góra	(Russia) CSKA Moscow	1	
February 22	(Croatia) Mario Hezonja	(United States) Portland Trail Blazers	(Greece) Panathinaikos	1	
February 23	(Spain) Pau Gasol	(United States) Milwaukee Bucks	(Spain) FC Barcelona	1	
February 24	(Germany) David Krämer	(United States) Austin Spurs	(Germany) Bayern Munich	1	
February 25	(Chad) Christ Koumadje	(Russia) Avtodor Saratov	(Germany) Alba Berlin	1	

=== Leaving a EuroLeague team ===
Date	Player	From	To	Ref.
June 2	(France) Charles Galliou	(France) ASVEL	(France) Dijon	
July 1	(Argentina) Luis Scola	(Italy) AX Olimpia Milan	(Italy) Varese	
July 3	(Bosnia and Herzegovina) Alex Renfroe	(Russia) Zenit	(Spain) San Pablo Burgos	
July 4	(Italy) Christian Burns	(Italy) AX Olimpia Milan	(Italy) Brescia	
July 4	(United States) Makai Mason	(Germany) Alba Berlin	(Spain) Manresa	
July 4	(Spain) Pau Ribas	(Spain) Barcelona	(Spain) Joventut Badalona	
July 5	(United States) Drew Crawford	(Italy) AX Olimpia Milan	(Italy) Brescia	
July 6	(Bosnia and Herzegovina) Ajdin Penava	(Spain) Baskonia	(Belgium) Mons-Hainaut	
July 7	(United States) Jordan Taylor	(France) ASVEL	(Japan) Levanga Hokkaido	
July 10	(Serbia) Mario Nakić	(Spain) Real Madrid	(Belgium) Oostende	
July 11	(Germany) İsmet Akpınar	(Germany) Bayern Munich	(Turkey) Bahçeşehir Koleji	
July 11	(Italy) Amedeo Della Valle	(Italy) AX Olimpia Milan	(Spain) Gran Canaria	
July 15	(United States) Tim Abromaitis	(Russia) Zenit	(Spain) Unicaja Málaga	
July 15	(Canada) Aaron Doornekamp	(Spain) Valencia	(Spain) Tenerife	
July 15	(Nigeria) Micheal Eric	(Spain) Baskonia	(Turkey) Türk Telekom	
July 16	(Greece) Ioannis Athinaiou	(Greece) Panathinaikos	(Greece) Peristeri	
July 17	(United States) Tyler Cavanaugh	(Germany) Alba Berlin	(Spain) Tenerife	
July 17	(Germany) Kenneth Ogbe	(Germany) Alba Berlin	(Germany) Brose Bamberg	
July 17	(United States) Jacob Wiley	(Greece) Panathinaikos	(Spain) Gran Canaria	
July 19	(Croatia) Ante Tomić	(Spain) Barcelona	(Spain) Joventut Badalona	
July 20	(Spain) Sergi García	(Spain) Baskonia	Andorra	
July 22	(United States) Semaj Christon	(Spain) Baskonia	(Turkey) Tofaş	
July 25	(France) Andrew Albicy	(Russia) Zenit	(Spain) Gran Canaria	
July 25	(United States) Nate Wolters	(Israel) Maccabi Tel Aviv	(Russia) UNICS Kazan	
July 29	(Israel) Jake Cohen	(Israel) Maccabi Tel Aviv	(Spain) Obradoiro	
July 31	(Russia) Sergey Balashev	(Russia) Zenit	(Russia) Enisey	
August 1	(United States) Deshaun Thomas	(Greece) Panathinaikos	(Japan) Alvark Tokyo	
August 5	(Serbia) Nikola Jovanović	(Serbia) Crvena zvezda	(Bosnia and Herzegovina) Igokea	
August 6	(Turkey) Egehan Arna	(Turkey) Fenerbahçe	(Turkey) Beşiktaş	
August 7	(Serbia) Stefan Peno	(Germany) Alba Berlin	(Germany) Rasta Vechta	
August 9	(United States) Dwight Buycks	(Greece) Olympiacos	(France) Nanterre	
August 10	(Australia) Brock Motum	(Spain) Valencia	(Turkey) Galatasaray	
August 22	(Serbia) Vladimir Štimac	(Serbia) Crvena zvezda	Monaco	
November 30	(Argentina) Facundo Campazzo	(Spain) Real Madrid	(United States) Denver Nuggets	
December 3	(United States) T.J. Bray	(Germany) Bayern Munich	(Spain) Zaragoza	
December 3	(Canada) Nik Stauskas	(Spain) Baskonia	(United States) Milwaukee Bucks	
December 9	(France) Théo Maledon	(France) ASVEL	(United States) Oklahoma City Thunder	
December 9	(Serbia) Aleksej Pokuševski	(Greece) Olympiacos	(United States) Oklahoma City Thunder	
December 18	(Montenegro) Taylor Rochestie	(Serbia) Crvena zvezda	(Israel) Hapoel Haifa	
January 15	(Finland) Petteri Koponen	(Germany) Bayern Munich	(Italy) Reggio Emilia	
January 16	(Greece) Antonis Koniaris	(Greece) Olympiacos	(Spain) Obradoiro	
January 24	(Latvia) Rihards Lomažs	(France) ASVEL	(Germany) Göttingen	
January 25	(Trinidad and Tobago) Johnny Hamilton	(Turkey) Fenerbahçe	(Montenegro) Mornar Bar	
January 30	(United States) Allerik Freeman	(France) ASVEL	(China) Qingdao Eagles	
February 18	(United States) Marcus Foster	(Greece) Panathinaikos	(Turkey) Türk Telekom	
February 21	(United States) Johnny O'Bryant	(Serbia) Crvena zvezda	(Turkey) Türk Telekom	
February 22	(United States) Malcolm Thomas	(Germany) Bayern Munich	(Spain) Unicaja Málaga	
