= MUO (disambiguation) =

MUO stands for the Miss Universe Organization.

MUO or Muo may also refer to the following

- Mountain Home Air Force Base in Idaho (IATA code)
- Mathiang Muo (born 1987), Australian-Sudanese basketball player
- MakeUseOf, a technology website owned by Valnet
- Muzej za umjetnost i obrt, the Croatian name of Museum of Arts and Crafts, Zagreb

== Former institutions ==
- Medical University of Ohio, which merged with University of Toledo in 2006 to become University of Toledo College of Medicine and Life Sciences
