= Agravanis =

Agravanis is a surname. Notable people with the surname include:

- Dimitrios Agravanis (born 1994), Greek basketball player
- Ioannis Agravanis (born 1998), Greek basketball player
