= Jay Bowie =

American basketball player (born 1992)

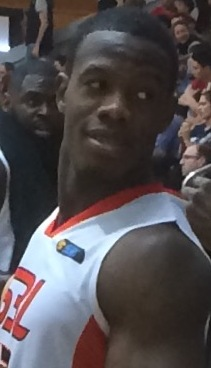
- Bowie in 2017

Free agent
- Position: Shooting guard / small forward

Personal information
- Born: March 25, 1992 (age 34) Tampa, Florida, U.S.
- Listed height: 6 ft 5 in (1.96 m)
- Listed weight: 210 lb (95 kg)

Career information
- High school: Middleton (Tampa, Florida); Tampa Prep (Tampa, Florida)
- College: Marist (2010–2014)
- NBA draft: 2014: undrafted
- Playing career: 2014–present

Career history
- 2014: Delaware 87ers
- 2015: Goldfields Giants
- 2016: Willetton Tigers
- 2016: Surrey Scorchers
- 2017–2018: Willetton Tigers
- 2019: Goldfields Giants
- 2020–2021: Lakeside Lightning
- 2022: Mandurah Magic
- 2023: Bali United
- 2024: Spartans SG
- 2024–2025: La Union Formosa
- 2026: San Antonio Gold

Career highlights
- All-NBL1 West First Team (2021); NBL1 West scoring champion (2021); 3× SBL All-Star (2016–2018)

Julius "Jay" Bowie (born March 25, 1992) is an American professional basketball player who last played for San Antonio Gold of the Liga Basquet Pro in Ecuador. He played college basketball for Marist College before playing professionally in the NBA Development League, Australia, England, Indonesia, Ecuador and Argentina.

== High school career ==
Bowie was born in Tampa, Florida. He attended George S. Middleton High School, where he spent his freshman and sophomore years before transferring to Tampa Preparatory School in 2008. As a junior in 2008–09, he was named Male Athlete of the Year after averaging a double-double with 14.8 points and 10.8 rebounds per game. As a senior in 2009–10, he again averaged a double-double with 16.3 points and 10.4 rebounds per game while leading his team to the Class 2A state final at the power forward position, alongside swingman teammate Jamal Cherry. He was also named to the Academic Honor Roll as a junior and senior.

On April 26, 2010, Bowie signed a National Letter of Intent to play college basketball for Marist College.

== College career ==
As a freshman at Marist in 2010–11, Bowie was the lone Red Fox to start all 33 games. He averaged 6.4 points and 4.2 rebounds per game, and led the team with 24 steals. On December 6, 2010, he was named the MAAC Rookie of the Week after averaging 13.0 points, 9.5 rebounds and 2.0 steals per game and leading the Red Foxes to conference wins over Niagara and Canisius.

As a sophomore in 2011–12, Bowie played in all 32 games and made 31 starts. He led the team in field goal and free-throw percentage with 49.1% and 84.9%, respectively, and was named to the MAAC All-Academic Team. On the season, he averaged 7.3 points and 4.3 rebounds per game. He scored a career-high 23 points on February 4, 2012, against Canisius.

As a junior in 2012–13, Bowie played in 18 games and made 17 starts, all of them at power forward. He missed all of January as he sat out from December 31 to February 3 due to concussion-like symptoms he sustained after taking a hit to the head in practice in mid-December. He finished the season with averages of 9.4 points and 4.9 rebounds, as he earned MAAC All-Academic Team honors for the second straight year.

As team captain his senior year in 2013–14, Bowie started all 31 games while averaging 12.1 points, 5.2 rebounds, 1.2 assists and 1.1 steals per game. He led the Red Foxes in free-throw percentage, three-pointers made and three-point percentage, while leading team in scoring three times and rebounding eight times. He graduated from Marist College with a major in business administration and finished just a dozen points shy of the 1,000-point plateau for his career.

=== College statistics ===
Year	Team	GP	GS	MPG	FG%	3P%	FT%	RPG	APG	SPG	BPG	PPG
2010–11	Marist	33	33	24.9	.399	.379	.727	4.2	.9	.7	.3	6.4
2011–12	Marist	32	31	20.4	.491	.370	.849	4.3	.8	.6	.3	7.3
2012–13	Marist	18	17	26.5	.527	.458	.833	4.9	1.3	.8	.2	9.4
2013–14	Marist	31	31	32.5	.423	.434	.812	5.2	1.2	1.1	.3	12.1
Career		114	112	26.0	.448	.416	.811	4.6	1.0	.8	.3	8.7

== Professional career ==
=== Delaware 87ers (2014) ===
After going undrafted in the 2014 NBA draft, Bowie took part in a pre-draft open tryout with the Delaware 87ers of the NBA Development League. On November 3, he was named in the 87ers' 17-man training camp roster. In his professional debut on November 15 in Delaware's season opener, Bowie played 16 minutes off the bench and had three points, three steals and two rebounds in a 109–106 triple-overtime win over the Canton Charge. After not playing in the 87ers' next game against the Westchester Knicks on November 22, he made his second appearance of the season on November 23 against the Maine Red Claws, recording two points, two rebounds and two assists in 12 minutes off the bench. On November 26, he was waived by the 87ers, with the team signing Nolan Smith in his place.

=== Goldfields Giants (2015) ===
On February 11, 2015, Bowie signed with the Goldfields Giants of the State Basketball League for the 2015 season. He made his debut for the Giants on March 14 in the team's season opener, scoring 18 points in a 114–76 loss to the Willetton Tigers. Following an injury to captain Lordan Franich in week one, Bowie was elevated to interim captain, a position he held for the rest of the season. On April 11, he scored 40 points in a 122–108 loss to the Perth Redbacks. On April 18, he recorded 30 points and 17 rebounds in an 89–85 loss to the Stirling Senators. On June 27, he recorded 34 points, 13 rebounds and seven assists in a 105–91 win over the Geraldton Buccaneers. He was subsequently named Player of the Week for Round 16. On July 4, he recorded 39 points and 16 rebounds in a 104–102 loss to the Perry Lakes Hawks. Despite starting the season with a 0–8 record, the Giants won 14 of their final 18 games to finish seventh with a 14–12 record. The Giants went on to defeat the Buccaneers 2–0 in the quarter-finals, before losing 2–0 to the South West Slammers in the semi-finals. Bowie appeared in all 30 games for the Giants and averaged 24.9 points, 8.4 rebounds, 3.9 assists and 1.2 steals per game.

After being named the Goldfields Giants' most valuable player for the 2015 season, Bowie was keen to return but was non-committal on 2016. The Giants were confident Bowie would remain with the club in 2016, after reportedly giving a verbal indication he intended to return.

=== Willetton Tigers (2016) ===
Highly recruited after his successful season with the Giants, Bowie signed with the Willetton Tigers for the 2016 SBL season in November 2015. The Tigers reportedly "offered him the world". In his debut for the Tigers in their season opener on March 18, Bowie recorded 36 points and 12 rebounds in a 90–82 win over the East Perth Eagles. On March 24, he scored 45 points in a 113–99 win over the Stirling Senators. In his return to Kalgoorlie to face the Giants on April 2, Bowie recorded 29 points, 13 rebounds and five assists in a 100–99 loss. On April 25, he recorded a triple-double with 21 points, 11 rebounds and 10 assists in a 147–66 win over the Kalamunda Eastern Suns. In the Tigers' regular-season finale on July 30, Bowie recorded 34 points and 13 rebounds in a 113–102 win over the Perth Redbacks. The Tigers finished the regular season in third place with an 18–8 record, going on to defeat the Senators 2–0 in the quarter-finals before losing 2–1 to the Joondalup Wolves in the semi-finals. Bowie appeared in all 31 games for the Tigers and averaged 24.7 points, 6.5 rebounds, 2.9 assists and 1.7 steals per game.

=== Surrey Scorchers (2016) ===
On August 19, 2016, Bowie signed with the Surrey Scorchers of the British Basketball League for the 2016–17 season. He was released on December 21, with the team citing the need for "someone bigger in the forward positions". In 11 regular-season games, he averaged 9.7 points, 4.6 rebounds, 1.8 assists and 1.1 steals, with his season high for points (17) coming on October 9 and his season high for rebounds (11) coming on October 22. He also appeared in three BBL Cup games.

=== Return to Willetton (2017–2018) ===
On February 10, 2017, Bowie re-signed with the Willetton Tigers for the 2017 SBL season. In the Tigers' season opener on March 18, Bowie scored 24 points in an 87–73 win over the Mandurah Magic. On March 24, he recorded 32 points and 11 rebounds in an 89–81 loss to the Cockburn Cougars. On May 26, he recorded 26 points and a season-high 14 rebounds and hit the game-winning three-pointer at the buzzer in overtime to lift the Tigers to a 101–100 win over the Perth Redbacks. On July 7, he scored 32 points in a 99–92 win over the South West Slammers. Bowie helped the Tigers finish the regular season as minor premiers with a 20–6 record. After defeating the Perry Lakes Hawks 2–1 in the quarter-finals, the Tigers were defeated 2–0 by the Redbacks in the semi-finals despite a 26-point effort from Bowie in a 101–92 loss in game two. In 30 games for the Tigers, he averaged 20.77 points, 7 rebounds and 3.17 assists per game.

In January 2018, Bowie re-signed with the Tigers for the 2018 season. On March 29, he scored a game-high 30 points in a 91–75 win over the Slammers. On April 8, he recorded 32 points and 13 rebounds in an 80–74 win over the Magic. He missed the entire month of May after sustaining an injury in late April. He subsequently missed the SBL All-Star Game. The Tigers finished the regular season in seventh place with a 13–13 record before being defeated 2–0 by the Joondalup Wolves in the quarter-finals. In 18 games, he averaged 20.44 points, 6 rebounds and 3.28 assists per game.

=== Return to Goldfields (2019) ===
On December 19, 2018, Bowie signed with the Goldfields Giants for the 2019 SBL season, returning to the team for a second stint. On April 6, he scored 36 points in a 120–110 win over the East Perth Eagles. On May 25, he recorded 34 points and 11 rebounds in a 93–88 win over the Mandurah Magic. He was subsequently named Player of the Week for Round 11. On June 2, he recorded 25 points, nine rebounds and nine assists in a 115–87 loss to the Warwick Senators. Due to an Achilles injury to Bowie, the Giants saw a form slump toward the end of the season. The Giants finished the regular season in seventh place with a 14–12 record before being defeated 2–0 by the Lakeside Lightning in the quarter-finals. In 24 games, he averaged 18.46 points, 6.67 rebounds and 5.62 assists per game.

=== Lakeside Lightning (2020–2021) ===
Bowie returned to Perth in 2020 and joined the Lakeside Lightning. In nine games during the West Coast Classic, he averaged 17.44 points, 6.89 rebounds and 3.67 assists per game.

On February 2, 2021, Bowie re-signed with the Lightning for the 2021 NBL1 West season. On June 18, he scored a season-high 31 points against the Warwick Senators. He appeared in just 11 regular season games but helped the Lightning finish second with a 17–5 record. He scored 18 points in the qualifying final against the Willetton Tigers and 23 points in the preliminary final against the Rockingham Flames. For the season, he averaged 23.3 points, 5.69 rebounds, 1.92 assists and 1.0 steals per game. He was the league's scoring leader.

=== Mandurah Magic (2022) ===
On March 8, 2022, Bowie signed with the Mandurah Magic for the 2022 NBL1 West season. In 19 games, he averaged 19.37 points, 6.16 rebounds, 3.16 assists and 1.63 steals per game.

=== Bali United (2023) ===
In December 2022, Bowie joined Bali United of the Indonesian Basketball League (IBL) for the 2023 season. The team finished the regular season in seventh place with a 15–15 record and lost 2–0 in the first round of the playoffs to Satria Muda Pertamina. He averaged a team-high 17.3 points and appeared in all 32 games.

=== Spartans SG (2024) ===
In February 2024, Bowie joined Spartans SG of the Liga Basquet Pro, the second division league in Ecuador. On June 16, 2024, he scored 35 points in 39 minutes in a 108–99 overtime win over Barcelona SC Caballito Zeballos.

=== La Union Formosa (2024–2025) ===
In August 2024, Bowie signed with La Union Formosa of the Liga Nacional de Básquetbol in Argentina. In 31 games in the 2024–25 season, he averaged 10.3 points and 3.5 rebounds per game.

=== San Antonio Gold (2026) ===
In July 2026, Bowie signed with San Antonio Gold, returning to the Liga Basquet Pro for a second stint.
