= Shannon Bogues =

American basketball player

No. 11 – Boulazac Basket Dordogne
- Position: Shooting guard
- League: LNB Élite

Personal information
- Born: February 20, 1997 (age 29) Killeen, Texas, U.S.
- Listed height: 6 ft 3 in (1.91 m)
- Listed weight: 194 lb (88 kg)

Career information
- High school: Ellison (Killeen, Texas)
- College: McLennan CC (2015–2017); Stephen F. Austin (2017–2019)
- NBA draft: 2019: undrafted
- Playing career: 2019–present

Career history
- 2019–2020: Wisconsin Herd
- 2020–2021: GTK Gliwice
- 2021–2022: Capital City Go-Go
- 2022–2022: Apollon Limassol
- 2023–2024: SAM Massagno
- 2024–2025: Alliance Sport Alsace
- 2025–2026: Le Mans Sarthe
- 2026–2026: Vikos Falcons
- 2026–present: Boulazac Basket Dordogne

Career highlights
- 2x Second-team All-Southland (2018, 2019)

Shannon Bogues (born February 20, 1997) is an American professional basketball player for Boulazac Basket Dordogne of the French LNB Élite. He played college basketball for the McLennan Highlanders and the Stephen F. Austin Lumberjacks.

== Early life and high school career ==
Bogues began focusing only on basketball in eighth grade. He attended Ellison High School in Killeen, Texas. As a senior, Bogues was named District 12-6A Offensive Player of the Year. He committed to McLennan Community College.

== College career ==
Bogues averaged 16.1 points, 3.7 rebounds and 2.9 assists per game as a freshman at McLennan. He led the Highlanders to the school's first trip to the NJCAA National Tournament since 1998 and earned the NTJCAC Freshman of the Year award as well as being a first-team all-conference pick. As a sophomore, Bogues averaged 18.8 points, 4.6 rebounds and 3.8 assists per game. He was named Northern Texas Junior College Athletic Conference Player of the Year. Bogues was a NJCAA Region V All-Region selection and an NJCAA Honorable Mention All-American, and earned MVP honors of the NJCAA Men's Basketball Coaches Association All-Star Game after scoring 16 points. He committed to transfer to Stephen F. Austin.

On February 10, 2018, he scored a career-high 35 points in a 97–50 win against Northwestern State. Bogues averaged 15.4 points and 2.4 rebounds per game as a junior and was named to the Second Team All-Southland Conference. He helped Stephen F. Austin reach the NCAA tournament, where they lost to Texas Tech 70–60 despite 14 points from Bogues. As a senior, Bogues averaged 17.9 points, 3.0 rebounds, 3.6 assists, and 1.2 steals per game, earning Second Team All-Southland honors. He finished his career at Stephen F. Austin with 1,075 points.

== Professional career ==
After going undrafted in the 2019 NBA draft, Bogues joined the Phoenix Suns for the NBA Summer League but was cut before the first game. He began his professional career in with the Wisconsin Herd, after they selected him in the second round of the 2019 NBA G League draft. He averaged 10 points, 2.5 rebounds, and 2.0 assists per game.

On July 11, 2020, Bogues signed with Niners Chemnitz of the German ProA. However, he parted ways with the team in the preseason and signed with GTK Gliwice of the Polish Basketball League on November 20, 2020. Bogues averaged 10.6 points per game.

On October 21, 2021, he was acquired by the Capital City Go-Go. Bogues was waived on February 1, 2022. He averaged 3.1 points and 1.4 rebounds per game.

On February 17, 2022, Bogues signed with Apollon Limassol B.C. of the Cyprus Basketball Division A.

On June 1, 2025, he signed with Le Mans Sarthe Basket of the French ProA league. On October 26, 2026, Bogues signed with Boulazac Basket Dordogne of the French LNB Élite.

== Personal life ==
Bogues is the son of Shannon Bogues Sr. His brother Shamir plays basketball at Tarleton State.
