= Vikos Falcons Ioannina B.C. =

- Leagues: GBL; Greek Cup
- Founded: 2022
- History: Vikos Falcons Ioannina B.C. (2022 – present)
- Arena: Ioannina New Indoor Hall
- Capacity: 400
- Location: Ioannina, Greece
- Team colors
- President: Ioannis Mantzios
- Head coach: Thanasis Giaples
- 2025–26 position: 2nd
- Championships: 2 Greek B League South Division (Beta Ethniki) (2023, 2024)
- Website: vikosfalcons.com

Vikos Falcons Ioannina B.C. or Vikos Falcons is a Greek professional basketball club located in Ioannina, Greece. The team's home ground is the Ioannina New Indoor Hall. Founded in 2022, the club has been participating in the Greek A2 Basket League, the second tier of the Greek basketball pyramid, until a strong 2025–26 season, when they were promoted to the Greek Basketball League (GBL). The team's logo, and mascot, depicts a falcon.

== History ==
During the 2021–2022 season, Vikos Falcons (formerly A.O. Spartakos Ioannina) participated in the Greek National League 2, in Group 4. They finished first with 35 points, 17 wins and 1 loss, 1535 points for and 1119 points against, winning the championship and promotion to the Greek National League 1.

During the 2022–2023 and 2023–2024 seasons, Vikos Falcons competed in the Greek National League 1, winning first place in the championship standings in both seasons. In the Playoff stages in both years, they were eliminated by Doxa Lefkadas and Trikala.

In the 2024–2025 season, Vikos Falcons competed in the Greek Elite League after being granted a Wild Card by the Hellenic Basketball Federation.

During the 2025–26 season, the club finished second in the Greek Elite League and gained the promotion to the Greek Basket League for the first time in its history.

== Arena ==
Vikos Falcons currently play at the New Ioannina Indoor Hall, a small arena that originally has a capacity of about 500 spectators.

== Current roster ==
Note: Flags indicate national team eligibility at FIBA-sanctioned events. Players may hold other non-FIBA nationalities not displayed.

Vikos Falcons roster
Players
Coaches

| Pos. | No. | Nat. | Name | Ht. | Wt. | Age |
|---|---|---|---|---|---|---|
| SG | 1 | (United States) | Bogues, Shannon | 1.91 m (6 ft 3 in) | 88 kg (194 lb) | 29 – 20 February 1997 |
| PG | 2 | (United States) | Smith, Adam | 1.85 m (6 ft 1 in) | | 34 – 8 November 1992 |
| PG | 3 | (Greece) | Karakostas, Ioannis | 1.90 m (6 ft 3 in) | | 22 – 4 February 2004 |
| SG | 4 | (Greece) | Georgiou, Dimitris | 1.93 m (6 ft 4 in) | | 27 – 6 July 1999 |
| PF | 5 | (United States) | Almonor, Ansley | 2.01 m (6 ft 7 in) | 111 kg (245 lb) | 23 – 1 May 2003 |
| G | 7 | (Greece) | Chantzis, Kostantinos | 1.91 m (6 ft 3 in) | | 20 – 20 July 2006 |
| SF | 8 | (Greece) | Agravanis, Ioannis | 1.98 m (6 ft 6 in) | 95 kg (209 lb) | 27 – 13 November 1998 |
| F/C | 10 | (Greece) | Sotiriou, Aristotelis | 2.03 m (6 ft 8 in) | 97 kg (214 lb) | 25 – 13 July 2001 |
| G | 11 | (United States) | Floyd, Jordan | 1.88 m (6 ft 2 in) | 77 kg (170 lb) | 29 – 22 May 1997 |
| PF | 12 | (Greece) | Patras, Vasilis | 2.02 m (6 ft 8 in) | | 31 – 22 March 1995 |
| C | 13 | (United States) | McNair Jr., William | 2.11 m (6 ft 11 in) | 120 kg (265 lb) | 26 – 25 May 2000 |
| SF | 14 | (United States) | Justice, Keshawn | 2.01 m (6 ft 7 in) | 102 kg (225 lb) | 27 – 22 October 1999 |
| C | 27 | (Greece) | Gontikas, Costis | 2.06 m (6 ft 9 in) | 112 kg (247 lb) | 32 – 15 March 1994 |
| PF | 41 | (Greece) | Patrikis, Andreas | 2.00 m (6 ft 7 in) | | 19 – 13 November 2006 |
| SG | 85 | (United States) | Freeman, Allerik | 1.91 m (6 ft 3 in) | 91 kg (201 lb) | 32 – 30 October 1994 |
| G/F | 88 | (Australia) (Greece) | Pozoglou, Nic | 1.96 m (6 ft 5 in) | 97 kg (214 lb) | 30 – 11 February 1996 |

Head coach

- (Greece) Thanasis Giaples

Assistant coach(es)

- (Greece) Dionysis Angelou
- (Greece) Vasilis Moysiadis

Legend

- (C) Team captain
- Injured

== Depth Chart ==
| Pos. | Starting 5 | Bench 1 | Bench 2 | Bench 3 |
|---|---|---|---|---|
| C | William McNair Jr. | Costis Gontikas | Aristotelis Sotiriou |
| PF | Ansley Almonor | Andreas Patrikis | Vasilis Patras |
| SF | Keshawn Justice | Ioannis Agravanis | Nic Pozoglou |
| SG | Allerik Freeman | Shannon Bogues | Dimitris Georgiou | Kostantinos Chatzis |
| PG | Jordan Floyd | Ioannis Karakostas |

== Notable players ==
Note: Flags indicate national team eligibility at FIBA-sanctioned events. Players may hold other non-FIBA nationalities not displayed.

Criteria

To appear in this section a player must have either:

- Set a club record or won an individual award while at the club
- Played at least one official international match for their national team at any time
- Played at least one official NBA match at any time.

- Dimitris Cheilaris
- Panagiotis Filippakos
- Dimitris Gravas
- (Greece) (United States) Nick Paulos
- Colin Slater
- Jordan Sibert
