= Jordan Floyd =

American basketball player (born 1997)

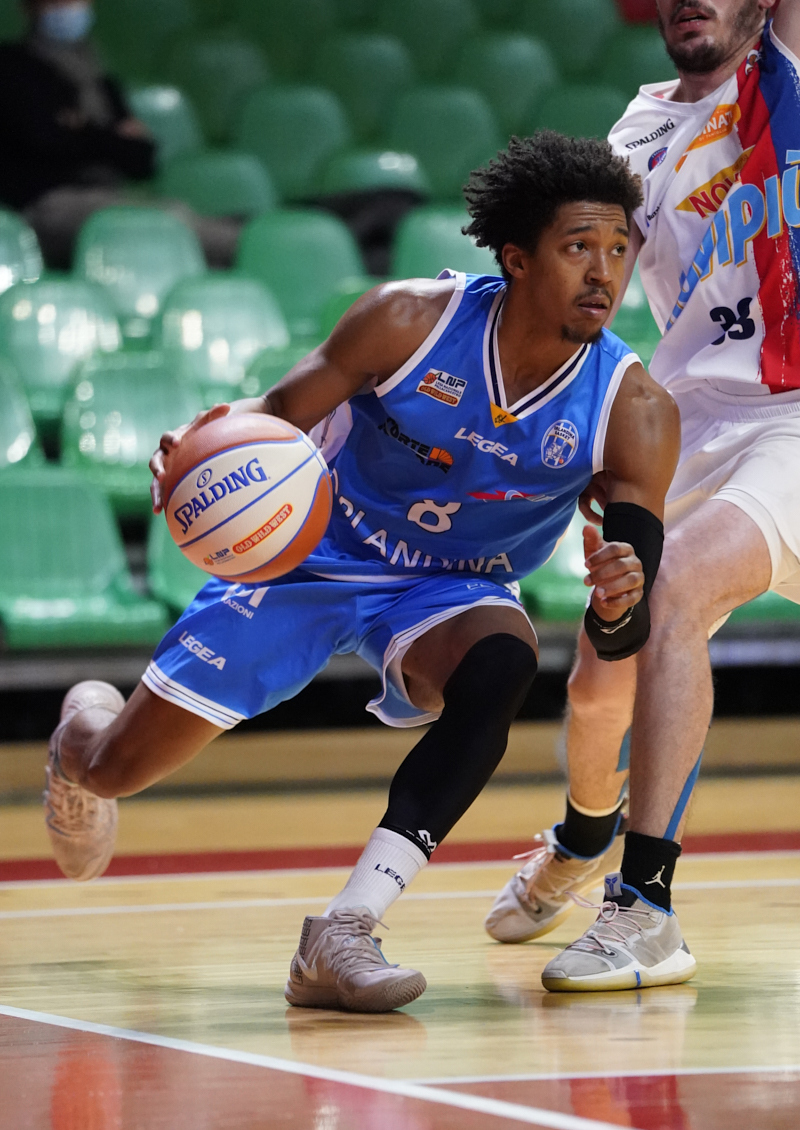
- Floyd with Orlandina in 2021

No. 11 – Vikos Falcons
- Position: Shooting guard / point guard
- League: GBL

Personal information
- Born: May 22, 1997 (age 29) Stone Mountain, Georgia, U.S.
- Listed height: 6 ft 2 in (1.88 m)
- Listed weight: 170 lb (77 kg)

Career information
- High school: Westover (Albany, Georgia)
- College: Albany State (2015–2016); King (2016–2020)
- NBA draft: 2020: undrafted
- Playing career: 2020–present

Career history
- 2020–2021: Orlandina
- 2021–2022: Kolossos Rodou
- 2022–2023: JL Bourg
- 2023–2024: Bursaspor
- 2024: Zhejiang Lions
- 2024–2025: Nanjing Monkey Kings
- 2025: Maroussi
- 2025: Maccabi Ironi Ramat Gan
- 2026: Tofaş
- 2026–present: Vikos Falcons

Career highlights
- Division II All-American – NABC (2020); NCAA Division II Scoring Leader (2020); 2× Conference Carolinas Player of the Year (2018, 2020); 2× First-team All-Conference Carolinas (2018, 2020)

Jordan Mailk Floyd (born May 22, 1997) is an American professional basketball player for Vikos Falcons of the Greek Basketball League (GBL). He played college basketball for the King Tornado and the Albany State Golden Rams.

== High school career ==
Floyd was a four-year varsity basketball starter for Westover Comprehensive High School in Albany, Georgia. He was a first-team all-state and 4A-1 all-region first team selection as a senior. Floyd had expected to play NCAA Division I basketball following high school, but his recruitment slowed down after he broke his wrist in his senior season. On April 30, 2015, he signed his National Letter of Intent to play NCAA Division II basketball for Albany State. Floyd also played baseball in high school.

== College career ==
As a freshman at Albany State, Floyd averaged 9.9 points, 2.5 rebounds and 1.5 assists per game, before transferring to King, another Division II program. In his sophomore season, he averaged 9.3 points and 2.7 assists per game. As a junior, Floyd averaged 21.7 points, 2.3 assists and two rebounds per game and was unanimously selected as Conference Carolinas Player of the Year. He led his team to the regular season conference title. Floyd fractured his left ankle in his only game in the following season and was granted a medical redshirt.

As a senior, Floyd averaged a Division II-high 31.9 points, 4.1 rebounds and 2.7 assists per game for King. Floyd set the school single-game scoring record with 43 points in a win over Mount Olive. He eclipsed his own record by scoring a career-high 47 points in a February 20, 2020, win over Erskine. On March 3, 2020, he became King's all-time leading scorer, surpassing Mark Dockery. Floyd was named Ron Lenz National Player of the Year, as well as Conference Carolinas Player of the Year for his second time. He earned Division II All-American honors from the National Association of Basketball Coaches.

== Professional career ==
On June 21, 2020, Floyd signed a one-year contract with Orlandina of the Serie A2 Basket.

On October 22, 2021, Floyd signed with Kolossos Rodou of the Greek Basket League. In 23 games, he averaged 14.6 points, 2.1 rebounds, 2.5 assists and 0.8 steals, playing around 22 minutes per contest as the team's 6th man.

On June 4, 2022, Floyd signed with JL Bourg of the LNB Pro A.

On July 27, 2023, Floyd signed with Bursaspor of the Turkish Basketbol Süper Ligi (BSL). On March 28, 2024, he signed with Zhejiang Lions of the Chinese Basketball Association.

On November 20, 2024, Floyd signed with Nanjing Monkey Kings. On February 28, 2025, he signed with Maroussi of the Greek Basketball League.

=== Maccabi Ironi Ramat Gan (2025) ===
On September 29, 2025, he has signed with Maccabi Ironi Ramat Gan of the Israeli League Israeli Basketball Premier League (Ligat HaAl).
