= Nick Paulos =

Greek American basketball player

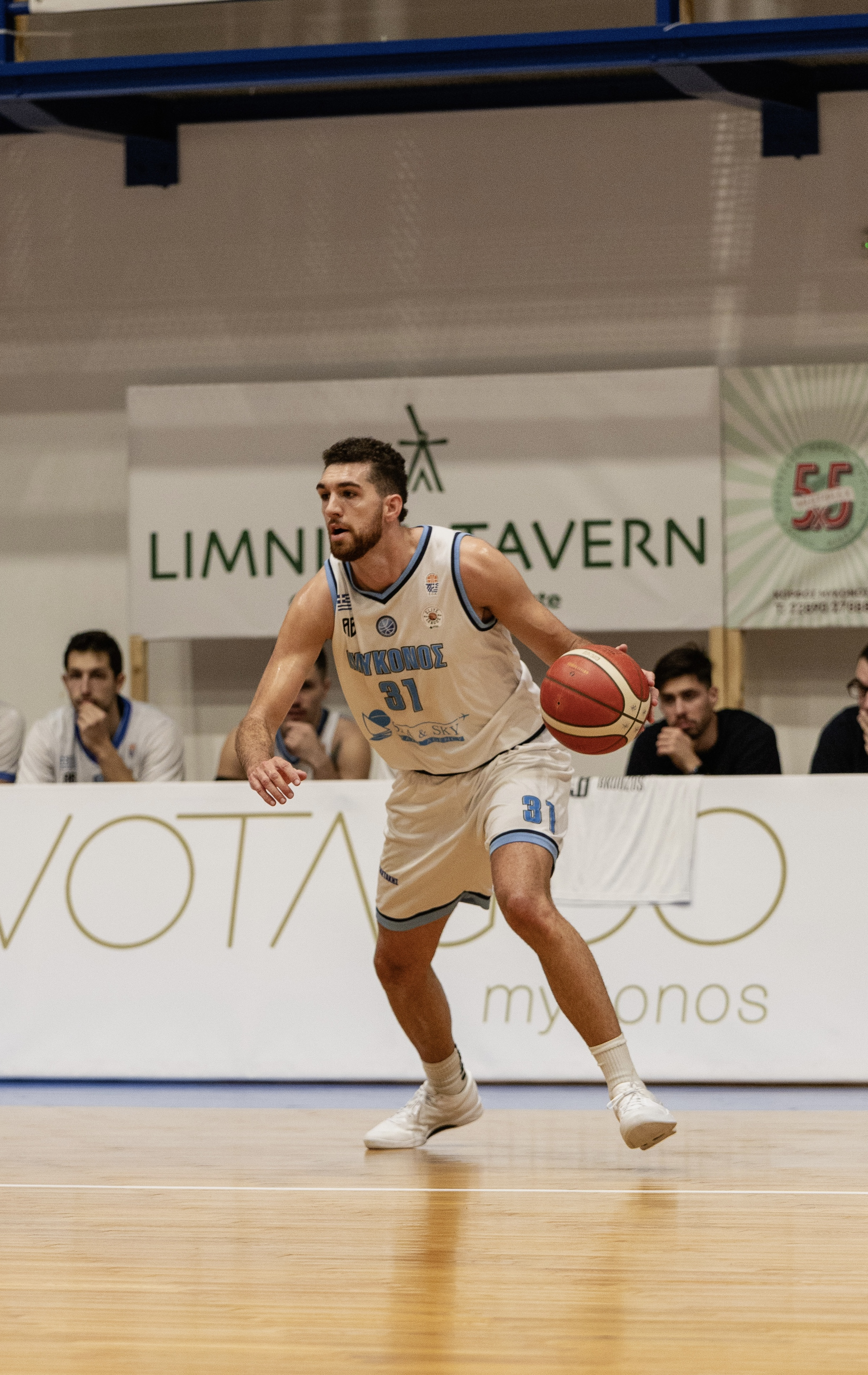
- Paulos playing with Mykonos.

Mykonos
- Position: Small forward / shooting guard
- League: Greek A2 Basket League

Personal information
- Born: February 26, 1992 (age 34) Salt Lake City, Utah, U.S.
- Listed height: 6 ft 7 in (2.01 m)
- Listed weight: 190 lb (86 kg)

Career information
- High school: Olympus (Holladay, Utah); New Hampton School (New Hampton, New Hampshire)
- College: UNC Greensboro (2011–2015)
- NBA draft: 2015: undrafted
- Playing career: 2015–present

Career history
- 2015–2017: AEK Athens
- 2015–2016: →Doukas
- 2016–2017: →Pagrati
- 2017–2018: Psychiko
- 2018–2019: Jämtland
- 2019–2020: Kolossos Rodou
- 2022–2023: Psychiko
- 2023–2024: Mykonos
- 2024–2025: Vikos Falcons

Nicholas Peter Paulos (born February 26, 1992) is a Greek American professional basketball player. Paulos played college basketball at the University of North Carolina at Greensboro (UNCG). He is a 6-foot-7-inch (2.01 m) tall swingman.

== College career ==
Born in Salt Lake City, Utah, Paulos played college basketball at UNC Greensboro. With the Spartans, Paulos became the 21st player in UNCG men's basketball history to reach the 1,000-career point scoring mark, when he hit a second half 3-pointer against Samford. He ranks third all-time with 262 3-pointers made, and second all-time in UNCG history, with 125 games played. He scored a career-high 30 points at Chattanooga, against the Mocs, and he set a UNCG single-game record with 10 three-pointers made off the bench, as he was 10-of-12 (83.3%) from long range, in just 21 minutes of action. He hit his first four three-pointers of the game, before hitting six straight, on consecutive possessions in the second half, for the single-game record.

As a junior, he scored a season-high 27 points against Davidson, and set a UNCG record with a perfect 9-of-9 shooting from long range. As a senior, Paulos led the Southern Conference, and ranked 12th in NCAA Division I, with 1,178 minutes played. His minutes played are the most by a Spartan, in a single season in program history.

== Professional career ==
In July 2015, Paulos began his professional career in the top-tier Greek League club AEK Athens, after signing a two-year contract with them. On 3 November 2015, he was loaned to Doukas of the Greek 2nd Division. With Doukas, he averaged 9.1 points, 4.1 rebounds, and 2.1 assists per game, in 22 games played in the Greek 2nd Division 2015–16 season.

On 5 October 2016, he was loaned to Pagrati of the Greek 2nd Division from AEK Athens. With Pagrati, he averaged 11.7 points, 5.8 rebounds, and 1.8 assists per game, in 18 games played in the Greek 2nd Division 2016–17 season.

He joined the Greek 2nd Division club Psychiko, in 2017. With Psychiko, he averaged 15.2 points, 5.5 rebounds, and 1.5 assists, while shooting 44.5% from the 3 point line.

In July 2018, Paulos signed with Jamtland Basket of the top tier Swedish Basketligan. With Jamtland, he helped lead the club to their first ever semifinal appearance averaging 11.4 points, 5.2 rebounds, 2.1 assists, 1.2 steals, while shooting 54% from the field, 42.1% from the 3 point line, and 89% from the free throw line. It was the most successful team in Jamtland basket history.

On August 5, 2019, Paulos returned to Greece and signed with Kolossos Rodou. Paulos suffered a knee injury in March 2020 that would require season ending surgery at the time that the league was postponed due to the COVID-19 pandemic.

In September 2022, Paulos made his return to active basketball, signing back with Psychiko of the Elite League in Greece. With Psychiko, he averaged 9.5 points, 4.5 rebounds, 1.5 assists, 1.07 steals, while shooting 55.2% from the field, 51.7% from the 3 point line, and 90% from the free throw line. He helped Psychiko win the Elite League regular season championship for the first time in the club's history.

On August 16, 2023, Paulos joined Mykonos of the Greek A2 Basket League. With Mykonos, Paulos led the team into the Greek Elite League for the first time in the clubs history. He averaged, 6.0 points, 4.2 rebounds, 1.8 assists, while shooting 49.5% from the field, 40.7% from the 3 point line, and 86.6% from the free throw line.

On August 24, 2024, Paulos signed with the Vikos Falcons of the Elite League of Greece.

== Personal life ==
Paulos has a Greek passport, due to his familial ethnic Greek heritage. His name in Greek is Νικόλαος "Νίκος" Πέτρος Παύλος (Nikolaos "Nikos" Petros Pavlos).

== College stats ==
Year	Team	GP	GS	MPG	FG%	3P%	FT%	RPG	APG	SPG	BPG	PPG
2011–12	UNC Greensboro	29	0	13.8	.361	.348	1.000	2.1	.3	.4	.2	5.5
2012–13	UNC Greensboro	31	3	20.0	.428	.406	.826	2.7	.5	.7	.2	8.0
2013–14	UNC Greensboro	32	32	29.6	.419	.365	.889	3.5	1.0	.4	.4	8.4
2014–15	UNC Greensboro	32	32	35.7	.453	.434	.741	3.7	1.6	.7	.3	10.7
Career		124	67	25.1	.421	.393	.831	3.0	.8	.5	.3	8.2

== Notes ==
- "Nicholas Paulos Stats, Bio - ESPN". ESPN.
- "Nicholas Paulos Bio - UNCG Athletics". uncgspartans.com.
- "Nicholas Paulos, NC-Greensboro, NCAA Basketball - CBSSports.com". cbssports.com.
- "Nicholas Paulos, Stats ,RealGM.com". basketball.realgm.com.
