= Nic Pozoglou =

Australian basketball player (born 1996)

No. 88 – Vikos Falcons
- Position: Shooting guard / small forward
- League: Greek Basketball League

Personal information
- Born: 11 February 1996 (age 30)
- Listed height: 196 cm (6 ft 5 in)
- Listed weight: 97 kg (214 lb)

Career information
- High school: St Dominic's College (Sydney, New South Wales)
- Playing career: 2014–present

Career history
- 2014–2015: Penrith Panthers
- 2016–2017: Bankstown Bruins
- 2017–2019: Illawarra Hawks
- 2018: Ballarat Miners
- 2019: Melbourne Tigers
- 2019–2020: Perth Wildcats
- 2021: Cockburn Cougars
- 2022–2023: Ballarat Miners
- 2023–2024: Koroivos
- 2024–2025: Mykonos
- 2025–2026: NE Megaridas
- 2026–present: Vikos Falcons

Career highlights
- Greek Elite League champion (2025); NBL champion (2020); Waratah League champion (2016); NBL1 West Most Valuable Player (2021); All-NBL1 West First Team (2021); NBL1 West Defensive Player of the Year (2021)

Nicolas Pozoglou (born 11 February 1996) is an Australian-Greek professional basketball player for Vikos Falcons of the Greek Basketball League (GBL). He played three seasons in the National Basketball League (NBL) as a development player between 2017 and 2020, winning a championship with the Perth Wildcats in 2020. In 2021, he was named NBL1 West Most Valuable Player as a member of the Cockburn Cougars. In 2025, he won the Greek Elite League championship with Mykonos.

== Early life ==
Pozoglou grew up in Sydney, New South Wales, in the suburb of Penrith. He began playing rugby league before switching to basketball in primary school. He attended St Dominic's College in Penrith and represented New South Wales at the 2015 Under 20 National Championships.

== Basketball career ==
In 2014, Pozoglou debuted for the Penrith Panthers in the Waratah League. He subsequently joined the Sydney Kings of the National Basketball League (NBL) as a development player for the 2014–15 season. He did not play for the Kings during the season. In April 2015, he was named in an extended 25-man squad for the Australian Emus under 19 team ahead of the 2015 FIBA Under-19 World Championship.

Pozoglou re-joined the Panthers for the 2015 Waratah League season. During this time, he battled stress fractures in his knees and later broke his foot which ruled him out for eight weeks.

After Penrith withdrew from the league, Pozoglou moved to the Bankstown Bruins in 2016 and helped the team win the Waratah League championship. He played a second season with the Bruins in 2017, averaging 19 points and 10 rebounds per game.

Pozoglou joined the Illawarra Hawks as a development player for the 2017–18 NBL season. He appeared in four games during his first season.

Following the NBL season, Pozoglou joined the Ballarat Miners of the South East Australian Basketball League (SEABL) for the 2018 season. In 20 games, he averaged 11.8 points, 7.3 rebounds, 2.7 assists and 1.3 steals per game.

Pozoglou re-joined the Hawks as a development player for the 2018–19 NBL season, where he appeared in five games.

Following the NBL season, Pozoglou joined the Melbourne Tigers of the newly established NBL1 for the 2019 season. He was ready for a breakout season after an "up and down season" with Ballarat in 2018. In 19 games, he averaged 19.1 points, 9.8 rebounds, 3.3 assists and 1.8 steals per game.

In August 2019, Pozoglou signed with the Perth Wildcats as a development player for the 2019–20 NBL season. He served as an injury replacement for Wani Swaka Lo Buluk early in the season. He was crowned an NBL champion in March 2020. He appeared in 10 games during the season.

Pozoglou was set to re-join the Melbourne Tigers for the 2020 NBL1 season, but the season was cancelled due to the COVID-19 pandemic.

In November 2020, Pozoglou signed with the Cockburn Cougars of the NBL1 West for the 2021 season. He was named NBL1 West Most Valuable Player, All-NBL1 West First Team and NBL1 West Defensive Player of the Year. In 20 games, he averaged 17.1 points, 10.5 rebounds, 3.2 assists, 2.2 steals and 1.3 blocks per game.

In February 2022, Pozoglou signed with the Ballarat Miners of the NBL1 South for the 2022 season, returning to the team for a second stint. In 21 games, he averaged 10.0 points, 7.1 rebounds, 3.1 assists, 2.7 steals and 1.2 blocks per game.

Pozoglou returned to the Miners as captain for the 2023 season and averaged 13.2 points, 7.9 rebounds, 3.3 assists and 2.0 steals in 22 games.

In July 2023, Pozoglou signed with Koroivos of the Greek Elite League for the 2023–24 season. In 29 games, he averaged 7.9 points, 8.2 rebounds, 2.0 assists and 1.6 steals per game.

In June 2024, Pozoglou signed with Mykonos for the 2024–25 Greek Elite League season. He helped the team win the Greek Elite League championship, which earned them promotion to the Greek Basketball League. Pozoglou scored two points in six minutes off the bench against NE Megaridas in the final. In 33 games, he averaged 7.5 points, 6.1 rebounds and 1.4 assists per game.

In September 2025, Pozoglou signed with NE Megaridas for the 2025–26 Greek Elite League season. In 29 games, he averaged 16.1 points, 7.4 rebounds, 3.0 assists and 2.6 steals per game.

In July 2026, Pozoglou signed with Vikos Falcons for the 2026–27 Greek Elite League season.

== Personal life ==
Pozoglou's father is Greek. As of 2021, Pozoglou had applied for a Greek passport.

Pozoglou's partner is fellow basketball player, Molly Mathews.
