= Andreas Patrikis =

Greek basketball player

Vikos Falcons
- Position: Power forward
- League: Greek Basketball League

Personal information
- Born: November 13, 2006 (age 20) Greece
- Listed height: 2.02 m (6 ft 8 in)

Career information
- Playing career: 2024–present

Career history
- 2024–2025: Lavrio
- 2025–2026: Panionios
- 2026–present: Vikos Falcons

Andreas Patrikis (born 13 November 2006) is a Greek professional basketball player who plays as a power forward for Vikos Falcons in the Greek Basket League.

== Professional career ==
Patrikis began his senior career with Lavrio B.C., making his debut in the Greek Basket League during the 2024–25 season. He appeared in 13 games, averaging 1.1 points and 1.0 rebounds per game.

On 6 August 2025, Panionios B.C. announced his signing ahead of the 2025–26 season. He had previously played for DEKA Basketball Academy, where he competed in the National League 1 and helped the team achieve promotion.

In 2026, Patrikis joined Vikos Falcons, continuing his career in the Greek Basket League.

== National team career ==
Patrikis has represented Greece at several youth international competitions. He participated in the FIBA U16 European Championship in 2022, the FIBA U18 EuroBasket in 2024 and the FIBA U20 EuroBasket in 2025 and 2026.

At the 2025 FIBA U20 EuroBasket, he averaged 7.0 points, 3.3 rebounds and 1.3 assists per game.

At the 2026 FIBA U20 EuroBasket, he averaged 12.6 points, 5.6 rebounds and 1.8 assists per game.
