= Keshawn Justice =

American basketball player (born 1999)

No. 14 – Vikos Falcons
- Position: Small forward
- League: Greek Basketball League

Personal information
- Born: October 22, 1999 (age 27) Madison, Wisconsin, U.S.
- Listed height: 6 ft 7 in (2.01 m)
- Listed weight: 225 lb (102 kg)

Career information
- High school: Madison East (Madison, Wisconsin)
- College: Santa Clara (2018–2023)
- NBA draft: 2023: undrafted
- Playing career: 2023–present

Career history
- 2023–2025: Salt Lake City Stars
- 2025–2026: Cholet
- 2026–present: Vikos Falcons

Career highlights
- 2× Second-team All-WCC (2022, 2023)
- Stats at NBA.com
- Stats at Basketball Reference

Keshawn Justice (born October 22, 1999) is an American professional basketball player for Vikos Falcons of the Greek Basketball League (GBL). He played college basketball for the Santa Clara Broncos.

== Early life ==
Justice attended Madison East High School in Madison, Wisconsin where he averaged 20.0 points and 11.0 rebounds as a senior and was named to the 2017–18 first team all-state by the Associated Press.

== College career ==
Justice attended Santa Clara where he played in 144 games, a school record, averaged 11.3 points, 4.4 rebounds, and 2.5 assists in 31.1 minutes across five seasons, earning All-WCC Second Team honors twice. In his last year, he averaged 13.3 points, 4.1 rebounds, and 2.5 assists, posting 21 double-figure scoring games and six 20-point games.

== Professional career ==
After going undrafted in the 2023 NBA Summer League, Justice joined the Utah Jazz for the 2023 NBA Summer League and on October 11, 2023, he signed with the team. However, he was waived six days later and on October 30, he joined the Salt Lake City Stars. In 31 games, he averaged 8.9 points, 3.6 rebounds, 1.3 assists and 0.7 steals in 23.8 minutes.

After joining them for the 2024 NBA Summer League, on September 20, 2024, Justice signed with the Jazz. However, he was waived three days later and on October 28, he rejoined the Stars.

In July 2025, Justice signed with Cholet Basket of the French LNB Pro A. In the 2024–25 season, Cholet reached especially the semi-finals of the FIBA Europe Cup 2024-2025 before securing direct qualification to the Basketball Champions League for the following season.

== Personal life ==
He is the son of Dedric and Michelle Justice and has two sisters and a brother. He majored in sociology.
