= 2021 NBL1 West season =

- League: NBL1 West
- Sport: Basketball
- Duration: 16 April – 14 August (Regular season); 20 August – 4 September (Finals)
- Games: 22 (men); 18 (women)
- Teams: 14 (men); 12 (women)

Regular season
- Minor premiers: M: Perry Lakes Hawks; W: Willetton Tigers
- Season MVP: M: Nic Pozoglou (Cockburn Cougars); W: Alexandra Sharp (Willetton Tigers)
- Top scorer: M: Jay Bowie (Willetton Tigers); W: Samantha Lubcke (Willetton Tigers)

Finals
- Champions: M: Perry Lakes Hawks; W: Willetton Tigers
- Runners-up: M: Rockingham Flames; W: Joondalup Wolves
- Grand Final MVP: M: Andrew Ferguson (Perry Lakes Hawks); W: Alexandra Sharp (Willetton Tigers)

NBL1 West seasons
- ← 2020 2022 →

The 2021 NBL1 West season was the inaugural season of the NBL1 West following the rebrand of the State Basketball League (SBL) under the NBL1 banner. It marked the 32nd season in league history after the 2020 State Basketball League season was cancelled due to the COVID-19 pandemic.

The regular season began on Friday 16 April and ended on Saturday 14 August. The finals began on Friday 20 August and concluded with the women's grand final on Friday 3 September and the men's grand final on Saturday 4 September.

The 2021 NBL1 season was scheduled to include a National Finals in Melbourne featuring the West champions but the event was cancelled due to the uncertainty surrounding border control restrictions across Australia.

== Regular season ==
In October 2020, Basketball Western Australia and the National Basketball League (NBL) announced a new partnership to bring NBL1 to Western Australia in 2021, with NBL1 replacing the SBL. The SBL was officially renamed NBL1 West and became the west conference of NBL1.

Seventeen rounds of competition was scheduled, with the regular season beginning on Friday 16 April. Round 2, Round 3 and Round 12 were not played (with games later rescheduled where possible) due to COVID-19 restrictions in Perth. Themed rounds included Pink Round (4), Mental Health Round (10) and Indigenous Round (13).

=== Standings ===
Men's ladder

Pos	Team	Pld	W	L	PCT	Qualification
1	Perry Lakes Hawks	22	18	4	.818	Finals
2	Lakeside Lightning	22	17	5	.773	Finals
3	Willetton Tigers	21	15	6	.714	Finals
4	Rockingham Flames	21	15	6	.714	Finals
5	Mandurah Magic	22	14	8	.636	Finals
6	Warwick Senators	22	13	9	.591	Finals
7	Perth Redbacks	22	13	9	.591	Finals
8	Cockburn Cougars	22	11	11	.500	Finals
9	Joondalup Wolves	22	10	12	.455	
10	Goldfields Giants	20	6	14	.300	
11	Geraldton Buccaneers	20	6	14	.300	
12	East Perth Eagles	22	5	17	.227	
13	Kalamunda Eastern Suns	21	4	17	.190	
14	South West Slammers	21	3	18	.143	

Source: NBL1
Due to COVID-related cancellations, some men's games were not able to be rescheduled and thus some teams played less games than others. The ladder was subsequently ranked on win percentage.

Women's ladder

Pos	Team	Pld	W	L	Pts	Qualification
1	Willetton Tigers	18	15	3	30	Finals
2	Joondalup Wolves	18	15	3	30	Finals
3	Perth Redbacks	18	11	7	22	Finals
4	East Perth Eagles	18	11	7	22	Finals
5	Warwick Senators	18	10	8	20	Finals
6	Rockingham Flames	18	10	8	20	Finals
7	Cockburn Cougars	18	9	9	18	Finals
8	Mandurah Magic	18	9	9	18	Finals
9	Perry Lakes Hawks	18	8	10	16	
10	Kalamunda Eastern Suns	18	5	13	10	
11	Lakeside Lightning	18	5	13	10	
12	South West Slammers	18	0	18	0	

Source: NBL1

== Finals ==
The finals began on Friday 20 August and consisted of four rounds. The finals concluded with the women's grand final on Friday 3 September and the men's grand final on Saturday 4 September.

=== Men's bracket ===
Qualifying and elimination finals
Aug 21, Bendat Basketball Centre
1	Perry Lakes Hawks	90
4	Rockingham Flames	75
Aug 20, Mandurah ARC
5	Mandurah Magic	63
8	Cockburn Cougars	62
Aug 21, Warwick Stadium
6	Warwick Senators	88
7	Perth Redbacks	111
Aug 20, Lakeside Recreation Centre
2	Lakeside Lightning	95
3	Willetton Tigers	92

Semi-finals
Aug 27, Mike Barnett Sports Complex
Rockingham Flames	99
Mandurah Magic	76
Aug 27, Willetton Basketball Stadium
Willetton Tigers	90
Perth Redbacks	92

Preliminary finals
Aug 28, Bendat Basketball Centre
Perry Lakes Hawks	92
Perth Redbacks	77
Aug 28, Lakeside Recreation Centre
Lakeside Lightning	72
Rockingham Flames	88

Grand final
Sep 4, Bendat Basketball Centre
Perry Lakes Hawks	92
Rockingham Flames	82

==== Grand Final summary ====
Kayo Sports

4 September 2021
7:00 pm

Box score
Report
Highlights

Perry Lakes Hawks 92, Rockingham Flames 82
Scoring by quarter: 29–20, 23–25, 20–23, 20–14
Pts: Andrew Ferguson 18; Rebs: Andrew Ferguson 15; Asts: Clarke, Purser 4 each	Pts: Ryan Godfrey 20; Rebs: Tom Jervis 10; Asts: Ryan Godfrey 4
Perry Lakes wins NBL1 West Championship

Bendat Basketball Centre, Floreat
MVP: Andrew Ferguson (Hawks)

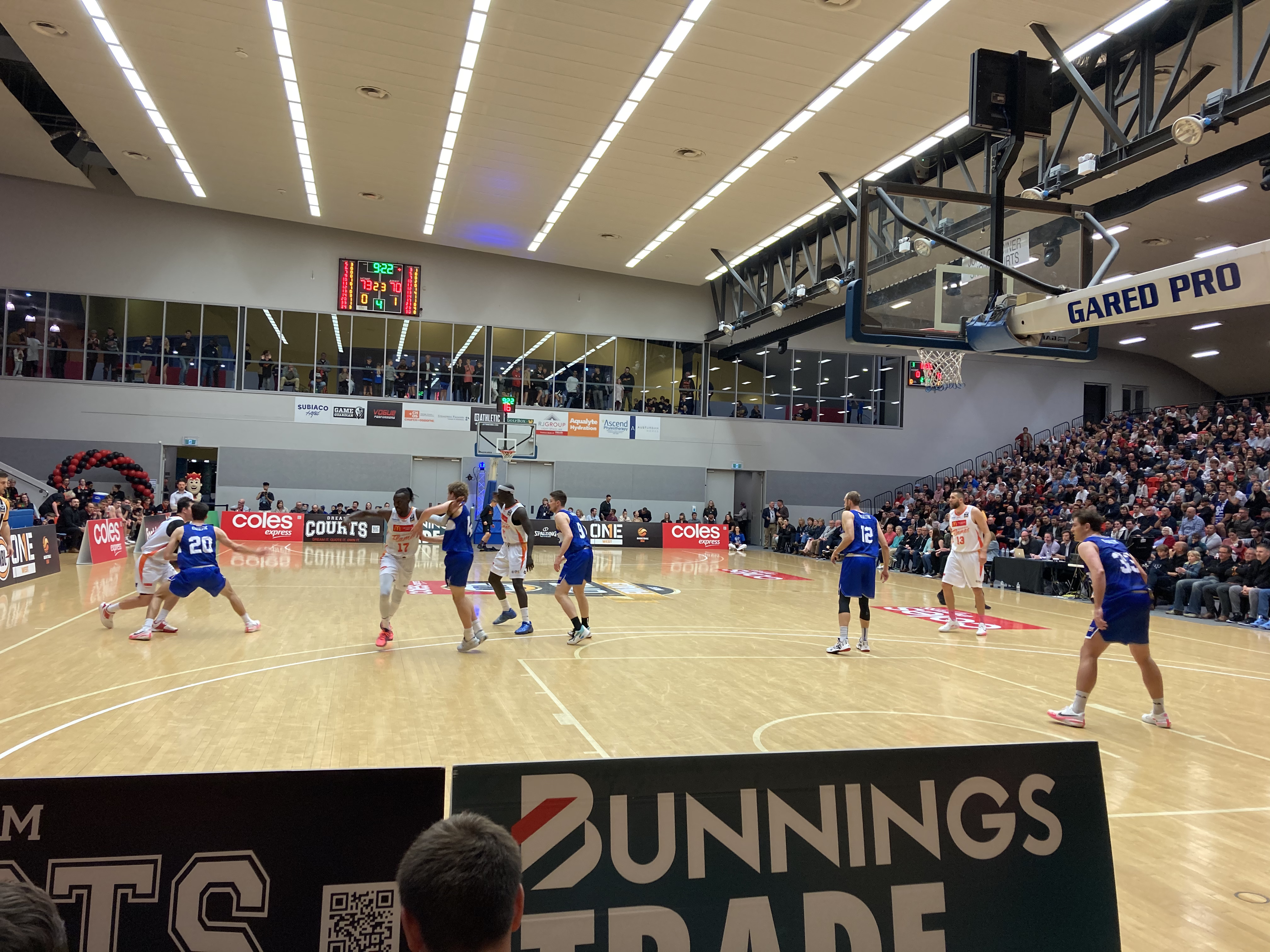
NBL1 West Men's Grand Final

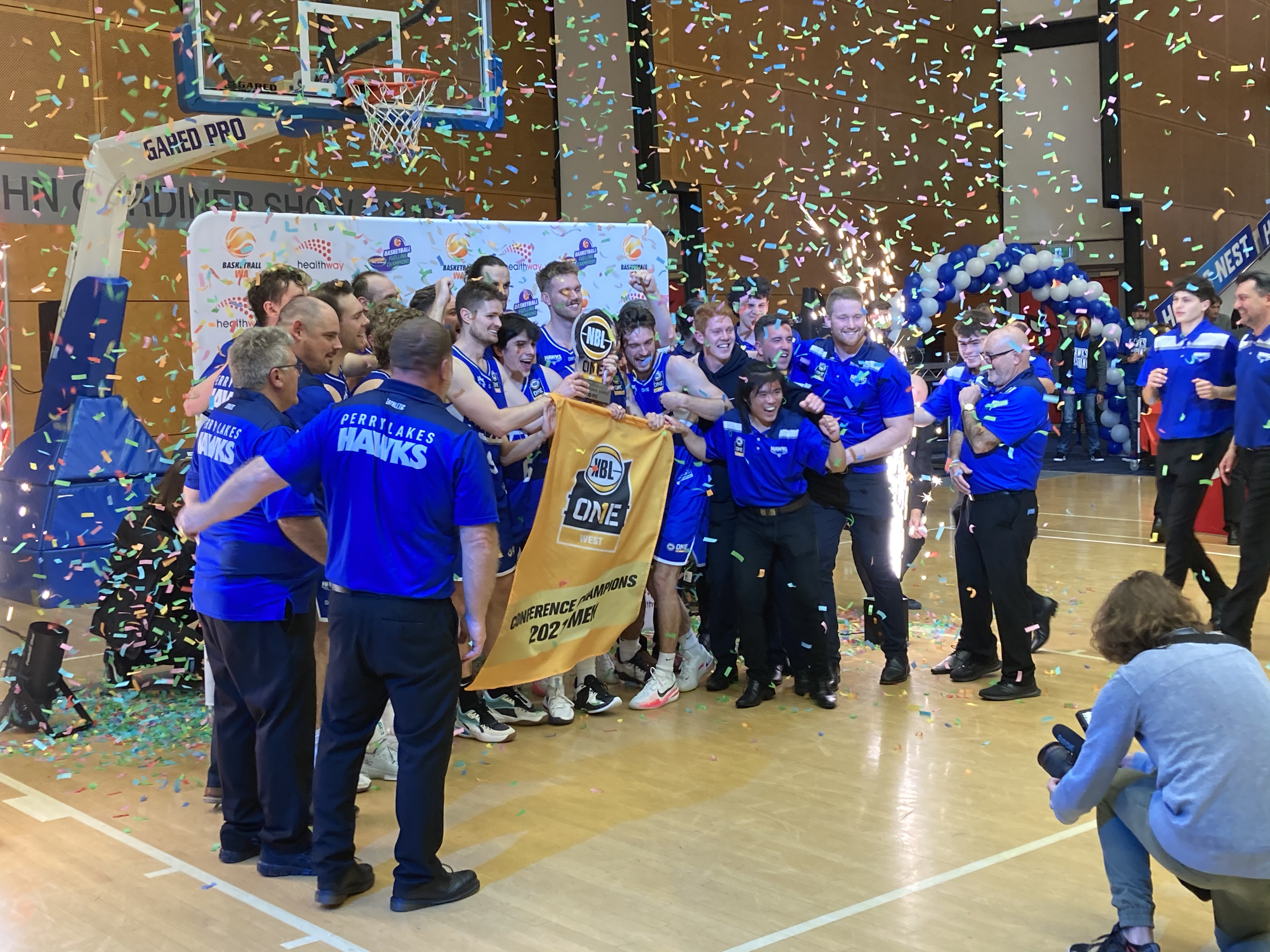
Perry Lakes Hawks 2021 Men's NBL1 West champions

=== Women's bracket ===
Qualifying and elimination finals
Aug 21, Willetton Basketball Stadium
1	Willetton Tigers	77
4	East Perth Eagles	73
Aug 21, Warwick Stadium
5	Warwick Senators	97
8	Mandurah Magic	64
Aug 20, Mike Barnett Sports Complex
6	Rockingham Flames	75
7	Cockburn Cougars	81
Aug 20, HBF Arena
2	Joondalup Wolves	90
3	Perth Redbacks	48

Semi-finals
Aug 27, Herb Graham Recreation Centre
East Perth Eagles	79
Warwick Senators	80
Aug 27, Belmont Oasis Leisure Centre
Perth Redbacks	74
Cockburn Cougars	70

Preliminary finals
Aug 28, Willetton Basketball Stadium
Willetton Tigers	90
Perth Redbacks	65
Aug 28, HBF Arena
Joondalup Wolves	98
Warwick Senators	61

Grand final
Sep 3, Bendat Basketball Centre
Willetton Tigers	65
Joondalup Wolves	54

==== Grand Final summary ====
Kayo Sports

3 September 2021
7:30 pm

Box score
Report
Highlights

Willetton Tigers 65, Joondalup Wolves 54
Scoring by quarter: 15–16, 23–15, 12–18, 15–5
Pts: Desiree Kelley 16; Rebs: Alexandra Sharp 15; Asts: Priestly, Sharp 4 each	Pts: Kayla Steindl 16; Rebs: Kayla Steindl 15; Asts: Parker-Williams, Denehey 3 each
Willetton wins NBL1 West Championship

Bendat Basketball Centre, Floreat
MVP: Alexandra Sharp (Tigers)

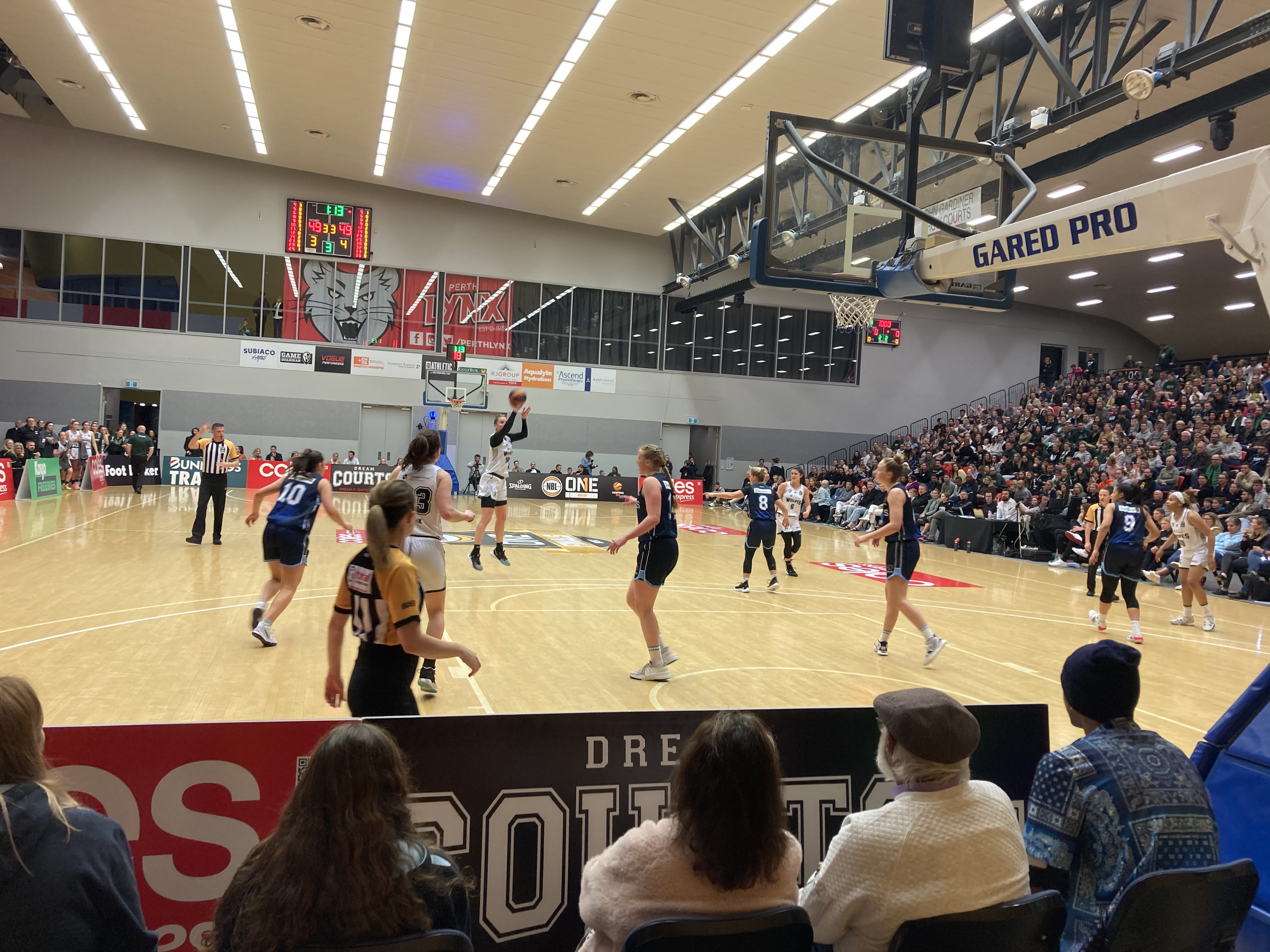
NBL1 West Women's Grand Final

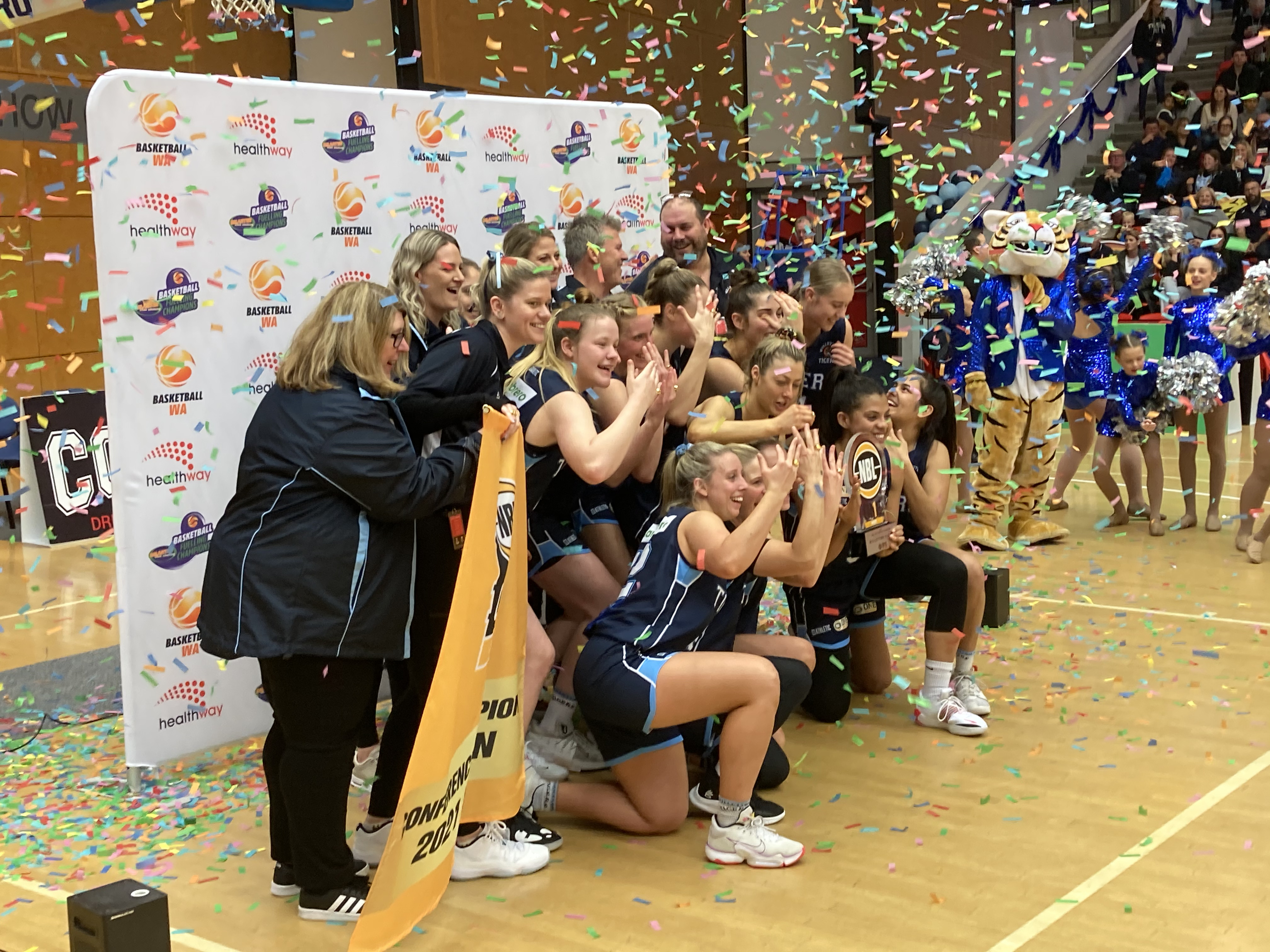
Willetton Tigers 2021 Women's NBL1 West champions

== Awards ==
=== Player of the Week ===
Round	Men's Player	Team	Women's Player	Team	Ref
1	Caleb Davis	Warwick Senators	Makailah Dyer; Emma Klasztorny	Perth Redbacks; Mandurah Magic	
2	Not played due to COVID				
3	Not played due to COVID				
4	Jerami Grace	Mandurah Magic	Kayla Steindl	Joondalup Wolves	
5	Nic Pozoglou	Cockburn Cougars	Samantha Lubcke	Willetton Tigers	
6	Michael Vigor	Willetton Tigers	Carly Boag	Mandurah Magic	
7	Jonathan Wade	Joondalup Wolves	Christina Boag	Rockingham Flames	
8	Mathiang Muo	Geraldton Buccaneers	Jessie Edwards	Cockburn Cougars	
9	Caleb Davis	Warwick Senators	Mary Goulding	East Perth Eagles	
10	Jay Bowie	Lakeside Lightning	Stacey Barr	Warwick Senators	
11	Chris Johnson	Kalamunda Eastern Suns	Samantha Lubcke	Willetton Tigers	
12	Not played due to COVID				
13	Marshall Nelson	Perth Redbacks	Makailah Dyer	Perth Redbacks	
14	Gavin Field	Cockburn Cougars	Mary Goulding	East Perth Eagles	
15	Rowan Mackenzie	Lakeside Lightning	Stacey Barr	Warwick Senators	
16	Joe Cook-Green	Kalamunda Eastern Suns	Alex Ciabattoni	Rockingham Flames	
17	Lochlan Cummings	Joondalup Wolves	Carly Boag	Mandurah Magic	
18	Jack Isenbarger	Lakeside Lightning	Kayla Steindl	Joondalup Wolves	

=== Coach of the Month ===
Month	Men's Coach	Team	Women's Coach	Team	Ref
April/May	Mike Ellis	Warwick Senators	Charles Nix	Joondalup Wolves	
May/June	Adam Nener	Willetton Tigers	Blake Srdarev	East Perth Eagles	
June/July	Aaron Trahair	Mandurah Magic	Simon Parker	Willetton Tigers	
July/August	N/A		N/A		

=== Statistics leaders ===
Stats as of the end of the regular season

Category	Men's Player	Team	Stat	Women's Player	Team	Stat
Points per game	Jay Bowie	Lakeside Lightning	23.82	Samantha Lubcke	Willetton Tigers	23.80
Rebounds per game	Jarrad Prue	Lakeside Lightning	14.85	Mary Goulding	East Perth Eagles	13.35
Assists per game	Scott Machado	Mandurah Magic	7.33	Casey Mihovilovich	Mandurah Magic	5.94
Steals per game	Scott Machado	Mandurah Magic	2.75	Casey Mihovilovich	Mandurah Magic	3.67
Blocks per game	Jarrad Anastasio	East Perth Eagles	1.67	Maddison Allen	Perth Redbacks	2.67
Field goal percentage	Brian Carlwell	Mandurah Magic	59.26%	Jessica Jakens	Perth Redbacks	67.11%
3-pt field goal percentage	Matthew Leary	Perry Lakes Hawks	50%	Mackenzie Clinch Hoycard	Warwick Senators	44.44%
Free throw percentage	Kyle Armour	Lakeside Lightning	88.52%	Alexandra Sharp	Willetton Tigers	88.51%

=== Regular season ===
The 2021 Basketball WA Annual Awards Night was held on Saturday 14 August at the Perth Convention and Exhibition Centre.

- Men's Most Valuable Player: Nic Pozoglou (Cockburn Cougars)
- Women's Most Valuable Player: Alexandra Sharp (Willetton Tigers)
- Men's Coach of the Year: Adam Nener (Willetton Tigers)
- Women's Coach of the Year: Blake Srdarev (East Perth Eagles)
- Men's Defensive Player of the Year: Nic Pozoglou (Cockburn Cougars)
- Women's Defensive Player of the Year: Emma Gandini (Willetton Tigers)
- Men's Youth Player of the Year: Rowan Mackenzie (Lakeside Lightning)
- Women's Youth Player of the Year: Jewel Williams (Kalamunda Eastern Suns)
- Men's Leading Scorer: Jay Bowie (Lakeside Lightning)
- Women's Leading Scorer: Samantha Lubcke (Willetton Tigers)
- Men's Leading Rebounder: Jarrad Prue (Lakeside Lightning)
- Women's Leading Rebounder: Mary Goulding (East Perth Eagles)
- Men's Golden Hands: (Note: Golden Hands Award winner is determined by the following equation: (Total Assists + Total Steals – Total Turnovers) / Games Played = Golden Hands Award Rating.) Scott Machado (Mandurah Magic)
- Women's Golden Hands: Casey Mihovilovich (Mandurah Magic)
- All-NBL1 West Men's 1st Team:
  - Jay Bowie (Lakeside Lightning)
  - Scott Machado (Mandurah Magic)
  - Mathiang Muo (Geraldton Buccaneers)
  - Nic Pozoglou (Cockburn Cougars)
  - Louis Timms (Perth Redbacks)
- All-NBL1 West Women's 1st Team:
  - Stacey Barr (Warwick Senators)
  - Mary Goulding (East Perth Eagles)
  - Samantha Lubcke (Willetton Tigers)
  - Alexandra Sharp (Willetton Tigers)
  - Kayla Steindl (Joondalup Wolves)

=== Finals ===
- Men's Grand Final MVP: Andrew Ferguson (Perry Lakes Hawks)
- Women's Grand Final MVP: Alexandra Sharp (Willetton Tigers)

== See also ==
- 2021 NBL1 season
