= Allerik Freeman =

American basketball player (born 1994)

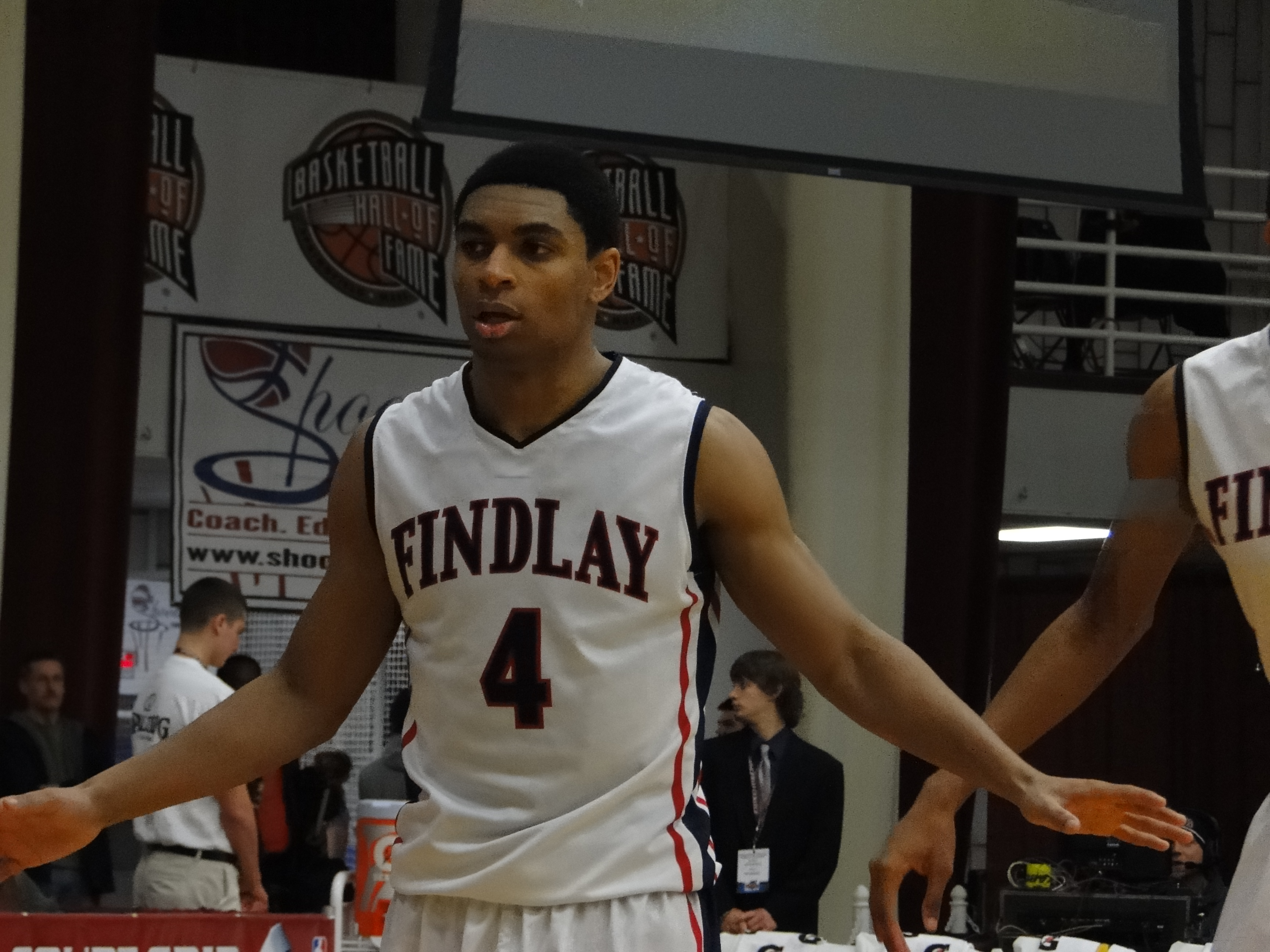
- Freeman playing for Findlay Prep in 2012

No. 85 – Vikos Falcons
- Position: Shooting guard
- League: Greek Basketball League

Personal information
- Born: October 30, 1994 (age 32) Norfolk, Virginia, U.S.
- Listed height: 6 ft 3 in (1.91 m)
- Listed weight: 200 lb (91 kg)

Career information
- High school: Olympic (Charlotte, North Carolina); Findlay Prep (Henderson, Nevada)
- College: Baylor (2014–2017); NC State (2017–2018)
- NBA draft: 2018: undrafted
- Playing career: 2018–present

Career history
- 2018–2019: Alba Fehérvár
- 2019: Bursaspor
- 2020: Shenzhen Aviators
- 2020–2021: ASVEL
- 2021–2022: Bursaspor
- 2022: CSKA Moscow
- 2022–2023: Reyer Venezia
- 2023: Beşiktaş
- 2023–2024: Budućnost VOLI
- 2024: Jiangxi Ganchi
- 2025–2026: Varese
- 2026–present: Vikos Falcons

Allerik Juwan Freeman (born October 30, 1994) is an American professional basketball player for Vikos Falcons of the Greek Basketball League (GBL). He played college basketball for the Baylor Bears and NC State Wolfpack.

== Early life and high school ==
Freeman was born in Norfolk, Virginia and grew up in Charlotte, North Carolina and attended The Renaissance School of Arts and Technology at Olympic. As a junior, Freeman averaged 17.6 points and 5.8 rebounds per game. He transferred to Findlay Prep in Henderson, Nevada before his senior year. Considered to be a top prospect by most recruiting services, Freeman initially committed to play college basketball at UCLA before ultimately de-committed after the team fired head coach Ben Howland. He ultimately decided to play for Baylor.

== College career ==
=== Baylor ===
Freeman played three seasons for the Bears after redshirting his freshman year due to a broken wrist. As a redshirt freshman, Freeman appeared in 34 games (1 start) and averaged 4.8 points per game. Freeman became a starter for Baylor as a redshirt sophomore and averaged 11.3 points per game. He averaged 9.7 points and 2.5 rebounds per game and shot 38.9 percent (44 of 113) from three as a redshirt junior. Freeman also lost his starting spot for the Bears following a four-game suspension from coach Scott Drew due to reported "attitude issues" during the season. Freeman ultimately announced his decision to leave Baylor and chose to play for his final year of NCAA eligibility at North Carolina State University as a graduate transfer.

=== NC State ===
In his only season playing for the Wolfpack Freeman averaged 16.1 points, 4.2 rebounds and 2.6 assists per game. He was named the Atlantic Coast Conference (ACC) Player of the Week twice during the season and was named honorable mention All-ACC at the end of the season. Off the court, Freeman was an Academic All-ACC selection.

== Professional career ==
Freeman worked out for several teams prior to the 2018 NBA draft, but ultimately went unselected. He was added to the Sacramento Kings NBA Summer League roster.

=== Alba Fehérvár ===
Freeman signed with Alba Fehérvár of the Hungarian Nemzeti Bajnokság I/A (NB I/A) on August 23, 2018. In his first professional season, Freeman averaged 14.8 points, 3.8 rebounds, and 3.5 assists in 29 NB I/A games (25 starts) and 17.1 points, 2.9 rebounds, and 3.9 assists in 16 FIBA Europe Cup games and was named honorable mention All-Europe Cup by EuroBasket.com.

=== Bursaspor ===
Freeman signed with Bursaspor Basketbol of the Turkish Basketball Super League on July 31, 2019. Freeman averaged 18.5 points, 4.6 rebounds, 4.1 assists and one steal per game in 14 games before leaving the team at the end of 2019.

=== Shenzhen ===
Freeman left Bursaspor to sign with the Shenzhen Aviators of the Chinese Basketball Association (CBA) on January 4, 2020. Freeman was the only American player in the CBA to stay in China through the coronavirus outbreak in China.

=== ASVEL ===
On June 12, 2020, Freeman signed with ASVEL of the LNB Pro A.

On January 31, 2021, he has signed with Qingdao Eagles of the Chinese Basketball Association (CBA), he didn't play any game.

=== Return to Bursaspor ===
On June 23, 2021, he has signed with his former club Bursaspor Basketbol of the Turkish Basketball Super League again. Freeman averaged 20.5 points, 3.5 assists, 3.1 rebounds, and 1.0 steal per game.

=== CSKA Moscow ===
On February 1, 2022, Freeman signed with CSKA Moscow of the VTB United League and the EuroLeague.

=== Reyer Venezia ===
On July 21, 2022, he has signed with Reyer Venezia Mestre of the Italian Lega Basket Serie A (LBA).

=== Beşiktaş ===
On February 1, 2023, he signed with Beşiktaş Emlakjet of the Basketbol Süper Ligi (BSL).

=== Pallacanestro Varese ===
On September 30, 2025, he signed with Pallacanestro Varese of the Lega Basket Serie A (LBA).
