= Tessa Lavey =

Australian basketball player

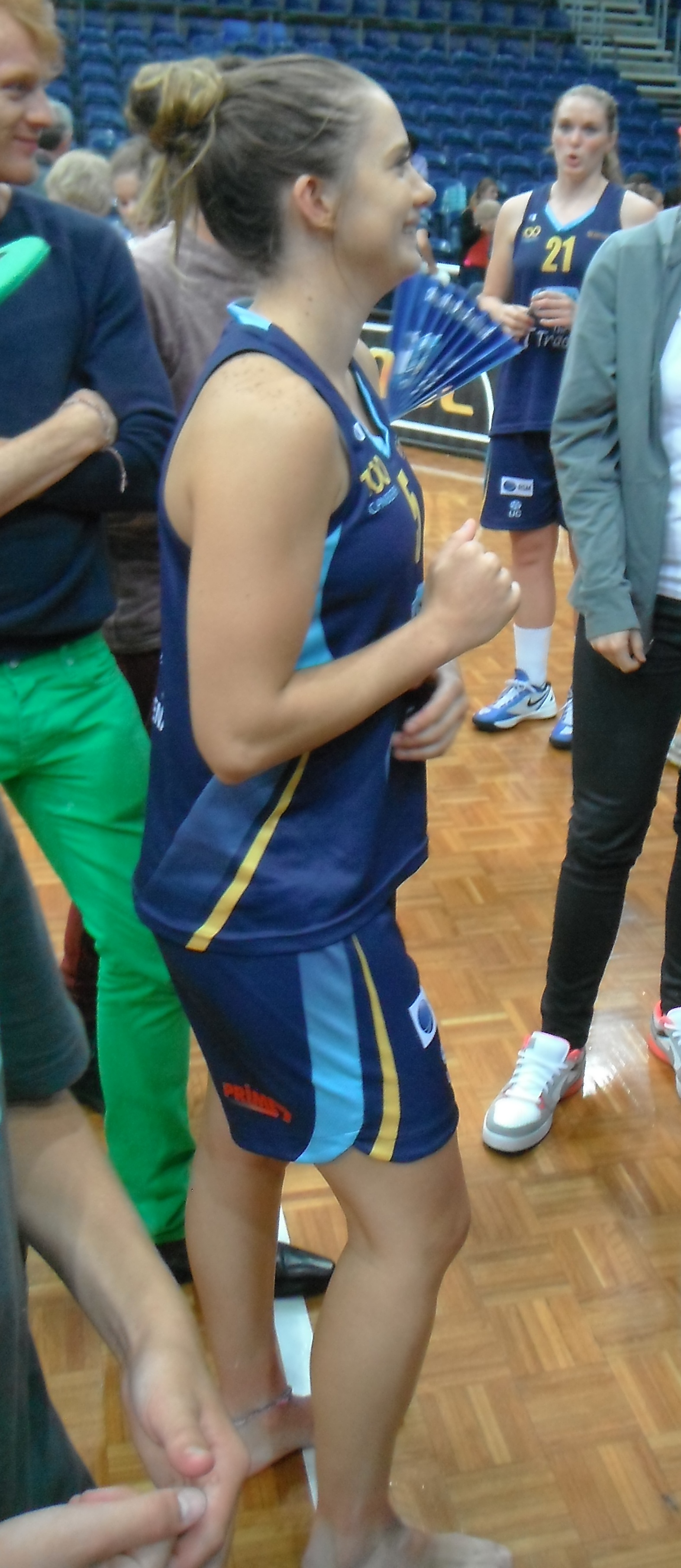

No. 24 – Bendigo Spirit
- Position: Point guard
- League: WNBL

Personal information
- Born: 29 March 1993 (age 33) Swan Hill, Victoria, Australia
- Listed height: 172 cm (5 ft 8 in)
- Listed weight: 64 kg (141 lb)

Career information
- High school: Lake Ginninderra (Canberra, ACT)
- Playing career: 2009–present

Career history
- 2009–2012: Australian Institute of Sport
- 2012–2013: Canberra Capitals
- 2013–2015: Bendigo Spirit
- 2015–2017: Perth Lynx
- 2017–2019: Dandenong Rangers
- 2019-present: Bendigo Spirit

Career highlights
- WNBL champion (2014)

Tessa Rose Lavey (born 29 March 1993) is an Australian professional basketball player for the Bendigo Spirit of the Women's National Basketball League (WNBL) and an Australian rules football player with the Richmond Football Club in the AFL Women's competition (AFLW).

Lavey was a member of the Australian Women's basketball team (Opals) at the 2020 Tokyo Olympics. The Opals were eliminated after losing to the USA in the quarterfinals.

== Early life ==
Born in Swan Hill, Victoria, Lavey attended St. Mary's Primary School before moving to Hamilton to attend Monivae College. She moved to Bendigo in January 2009 where she attended Catholic College Bendigo before moving again later that year to Canberra to attend the Australian Institute of Sport and finish off her schooling at Lake Ginninderra Secondary College.

As a junior, Lavey played for the Swan Hill age divisions, participated in the Bendigo Basketball Association's summer competition, and represented the Eltham Wildcats in the Victorian Junior Basketball League.

== Professional basketball career ==
=== Australian Institute of Sport ===
In December 2009, Lavey was offered a basketball scholarship at the Australian Institute of Sport (AIS) and joined the WNBL team for the rest of the 2009–10 WNBL season. In eight games for the AIS in 2009–10, she averaged 4.0 points and 3.7 rebounds per game. She continued to compete for the AIS in 2010–11 and 2011–12 where she played a total of 25 games over two seasons and averaged 3.9 points per game.

=== Canberra Capitals ===
Following the 2011–12 WNBL season, Lavey joined the Canberra Capitals Academy for the 2012 SEABL season. She subsequently joined the Canberra Capitals senior team for the 2012–13 WNBL season. She played nine games for Canberra in 2012–13 and scored four total points. She re-joined the Canberra Capitals Academy for the 2013 SEABL season.

=== Bendigo Spirit ===
On 8 June 2013, Lavey signed with the Bendigo Spirit. In 41 games for Bendigo over two seasons, she averaged 1.8 points per game. She also played for the BA Centre of Excellence in 2014, and for the Bendigo Lady Braves in 2015.

=== Perth Lynx ===
On 22 June 2015, Lavey signed a two-year deal with the Perth Lynx. She was later named the inaugural captain of the Lynx after impressing both her teammates and coaches with her work ethic and leadership on and off the training court during pre-season. On 9 December, she was named in the WNBL Team of the Week for the first time in 2015–16. She led the Lynx to a second place regular season finish with a 16–8 win–loss record, and went on to score 15 points in the team's semi-final win over the first-seeded Townsville Fire. With the win, the Lynx advanced to the WNBL grand final for the first time since 1999. There they were outclassed by the defending champion Townsville (who made it to the grand final via the preliminary final), losing the best-of-three series 2–0. In 26 games for the Lynx in 2015–16, she averaged 10.2 points, 3.4 rebounds, 3.4 assists and 1.2 steals per game.

On 29 September 2016, Lavey underwent surgery to remove a blood vessel from her ankle and was subsequently ruled out for three to four weeks.

=== Dandenong Rangers ===
On 19 May 2017, Lavey signed a two-year deal with the Dandenong Rangers.

=== Bendigo Spirit ===
Lavey returned to the Spirit where she played during the 2019–20 season.

== National basketball team career ==
In August 2009, Lavey competed for Australia at the inaugural FIBA Oceania under-17 championships against New Zealand. The following year, she competed for Australia at the 2010 FIBA Under-17 World Championship.

In 2014, Lavey represented the Opals for the first time at the 2014 FIBA World Championship, where the team won a bronze medal. Two years later, she made her Olympic debut for the Opals at the 2016 Rio Olympics. In April 2018, Lavey represented the Opals at the 2018 Gold Coast Commonwealth Games, where the team won a gold medal. In June 2021, Lavey represented the Opals at the 2020 Tokyo Olympics. Lavey, like all the other members of the 2020 Tokyo Olympics Opals women's basketball team, had a difficult tournament. The Opals lost their first two group stage matches. They looked flat against Belgium and then lost to China in heartbreaking circumstances. In their last group match the Opals needed to beat Puerto Rico by 25 or more in their final match to progress. This they did by 27 in a very exciting match. However, they lost to the United States in their quarterfinal 79 to 55.

== AFL Women's career ==
After training with the club in the winter of 2020, Lavey was drafted by Richmond with the 43rd pick overall in the 2020 AFL Women's draft.
