= Mary Goulding =

New Zealand basketball player

Personal information
- Born: 24 August 1996 (age 30) Canada
- Listed height: 183 cm (6 ft 0 in)

Career information
- High school: Rangiora (Rangiora, New Zealand)
- College: Gillette (2015–2016); Fordham (2016–2019)
- WNBA draft: 2019: undrafted
- Playing career: 2014–present
- Position: Forward

Career history
- 2014–2015: Canterbury Wildcats
- 2018: Canterbury Wildcats
- 2019: Rockhampton Cyclones
- 2019–2020: IK Eos Lund
- 2020–2022: Bendigo Spirit
- 2021: East Perth Eagles
- 2022: Mainland Pouākai
- 2024: East Perth Eagles
- 2024: Northern Kahu
- 2025: Rockhampton Cyclones

Career highlights
- All-NBL1 West First Team (2021); NBL1 West leading rebounder (2021); Atlantic 10 Tournament MVP (2019); All-Atlantic 10 First Team (2019)

Mary Teresa Goulding (born 24 August 1996) is a New Zealand professional basketball player.

== Early life and career ==
Goulding was born in Canada. She was raised in Rangiora, New Zealand, where she attended Rangiora High School and played both basketball and netball.

Goulding played in the Women's Basketball Championship (WBC) for the Canterbury Wildcats in 2014 and 2015. In 2018, she returned to the Wildcats for a one-game stint.

== College career ==
In 2015, Goulding began her college career for the Gillette Pronghorns in Gillette, Wyoming, participating in the NJCAA. After her first year, Goulding would then go on to play Division I basketball with the Fordham Rams in Bronx, New York. During her senior year, Goulding was named team captain of the Rams and A-10 Championship Most Outstanding Player.

== Professional career ==
In 2019, Goulding played for the Rockhampton Cyclones in the Queensland Basketball League.

For the 2019–20 season, Goulding moved to Sweden to play for IK Eos Lund of the Basketligan dam.

In 2020, Goulding played for the Bendigo Spirit during the WNBL Hub season in Queensland.

In 2021, Goulding played for the East Perth Eagles of the NBL1 West. She was the league's leading rebounder and earned All-NBL1 West First Team honours.

For the 2021–22 WNBL season, Goulding returned to the Bendigo Spirit.

In 2022, Goulding joined the Mainland Pouākai for the inaugural season of the Tauihi Basketball Aotearoa. She tore her achilles tendon during the season.

In February 2024, Goulding signed with the East Perth Eagles for the 2024 NBL1 West season, returning to the team for a second stint. On 28 March 2024, in her return to the court 10 months after her accident, she had 14 points, 12 rebounds and four assists in a 96–81 loss to the Warwick Senators. Later that year, she played for Northern Kahu in the 2024 Tauihi Basketball Aotearoa season.

Goulding joined the Rockhampton Cyclones of the NBL1 North for the 2025 NBL1 season.

== National team career ==
In 2021, Goulding represented the New Zealand Tall Ferns at the FIBA Asia Cup.

== Personal life ==
Goulding is the daughter of Tim and Jennifer. Her mother is American. She has four sisters, Bernadette, Celine, Georgia and Lara, and a brother John Paul. She is Catholic.

On 20 May 2023, Goulding was admitted to Christchurch Hospital's intensive care unit in critical condition following a car crash in her hometown of Rangiora. After twelve days in an induced coma, she was transferred to an Auckland rehab facility. Three months later, on 28 August, she was a passenger in a taxi when she was involved in another similar crash a few blocks from where the first one occurred, and in almost identical circumstances. She emerged unscathed from the second accident.
