= Ioannis Agravanis =

Greek basketball player

No. 8 – Vikos Falcons
- Position: Small forward
- League: GBL

Personal information
- Born: November 13, 1998 (age 28) Maroussi, Athens, Greece
- Listed height: 1.98 m (6 ft 6 in)
- Listed weight: 95 kg (209 lb)

Career information
- Playing career: 2016–present

Career history
- 2016–2017: Doukas
- 2017–2020: AEK Athens
- 2018–2020: → Peristeri
- 2020–2021: Promitheas Patras
- 2020: → Charilaos Trikoupis
- 2021–2022: Iraklis Thessaloniki
- 2022: Promitheas Patras
- 2022–2023: Karditsa
- 2023–2024: USK Praha
- 2024–2025: Tindastóll
- 2025–2026: Stjarnan
- 2026–present: Vikos Falcons

Career highlights
- FIBA Champions League champion (2018); Greek Cup winner (2018); Greek Youth All Star Game Slam Dunk Champion (2019)
Medals
Representing Greece
Men's basketball
FIBA Europe Under-20 Championship
Gold medal – first place	2017 Greece	Under-20

Ioannis "Giannis" Agravanis (Greek: Ιωάννης "Γιάννης" Αγραβάνης; born November 13, 1998) is a Greek professional basketball player for Vikos Falcons of the Greek Basketball League (GBL). At a height of 1.98 m (6 ft 6 in) tall, he plays the small forward position.

== Youth career ==
Agravanis played from a young age with the youth teams of Doukas, before he started his pro career.

== Professional career ==
Agravanis began his pro career in the 2016–17 season, with the Greek 2nd Division club Doukas. On August 9, 2017, Agravanis moved to AEK Athens of the top-tier level Greek League. He signed a three-year contract with AEK, with the option to sign with the club for an additional two years. With AEK, he also won the Greek Cup title, in 2018.

On September 22, 2018, he was loaned from AEK to Peristeri, for the 2018–19 season. His loan was renewed for another season on August 13, 2019. On August 1, 2020, Agravanis was officially released from AEK Athens.

Subsequently, Agravanis signed a three-year contract with Promitheas Patras, which then loaned him to the Greek club Charilaos Trikoupis, for the 2020–21 season.

On July 25, 2021, Agravanis moved to Iraklis Thessaloniki. On February 2, 2022, he mutually parted ways with the club due to disciplinary reasons. In 11 games, he averaged 10.2 points and 5.1 rebounds, playing around 31 minutes per contest. On April 8 of the same year, Agravanis agreed to return to Promitheas for the rest of the season. In 18 league games, he averaged 5.2 points, 2.4 rebounds and 1.3 assists, playing around 16 minutes per contest.

On August 3, 2022, Agravanis signed with the newly promoted Karditsa. In 22 league games, he averaged 6.6 points, 5.6 rebounds, 1.7 assists and 1 steal in 25 minutes per contest.

On September 27, 2023, Agravanis signed with Czech club USK Praha.

In August 2024, Agravanis signed with Tindastóll of the Icelandic Úrvalsdeild karla.

In August 2025, he signed with Stjarnan.

== National team career ==
As a member of the junior national teams of Greece, Agravanis played at the 2016 FIBA Europe Under-18 Championship, and at the 2017 FIBA Europe Under-20 Championship, where he won a gold medal.

== Personal life ==
Agravanis' older brother, Dimitris, is also a professional basketball player.

== Career statistics ==
=== Domestic Leagues ===
==== Regular season ====
Legend
GP	Games played	MPG	Minutes per game	FG%	Field goal percentage
3P%	3-point field goal percentage	FT%	Free throw percentage	RPG	Rebounds per game
APG	Assists per game	SPG	Steals per game	BPG	Blocks per game
PPG	Points per game	**Bold**	Career high		Led the league

Note: Only games in the primary domestic competitions are included. Therefore, games in cup or European competitions are left out.

Year	Team	League	GP	MPG	FG%	3P%	FT%	RPG	APG	SPG	BPG	PPG
2017–18	A.E.K.	GBL	3	2.4	.000	.000	-	0	.3	.3	0	0
2018–19	Peristeri	GBL	25	12.4	.368	.324	.722	2.3	.6	.6	0	2.6

== Awards and accomplishments ==
=== Pro career ===
- FIBA Champions League winner: (2018)
- Greek Cup Winner: (2018)

=== Greek junior national team ===
- 2017 FIBA Europe Under-20 Championship: Gold
