= Mathiang Muo =

Australian-Sudanese basketball player

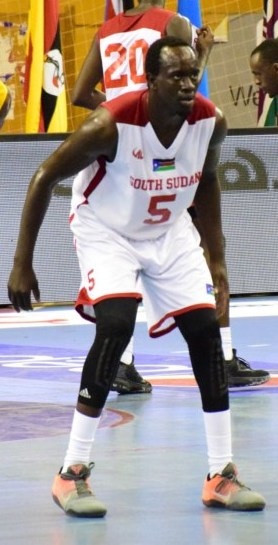
- Muo with South Sudan in 2017

No. 46 – Perth Redbacks
- Position: Shooting guard / small forward
- League: NBL1 West

Personal information
- Born: 4 March 1987 (age 39) Khartoum, Sudan
- Listed height: 6 ft 5 in (1.96 m)
- Listed weight: 210 lb (95 kg)

Career information
- High school: The Winchendon School (Winchendon, Massachusetts); The Patterson School (Lenoir, North Carolina)
- College: Northeastern (2009–2010); Central Florida CC (2010–2011); Charleston Southern (2011–2013)
- NBA draft: 2013: undrafted
- Playing career: 2013–present

Career history
- 2013–2015: Perth Wildcats
- 2014: East Perth Eagles
- 2015: Goldfields Giants
- 2016: Brisbane Spartans
- 2017–2018: Hobart Chargers
- 2019: Hobart Huskies
- 2019: Bendigo Braves
- 2020: South West Metro Pirates
- 2021–2022: Geraldton Buccaneers
- 2023: Joondalup Wolves
- 2024: South West Slammers
- 2025–present: Perth Redbacks

Career highlights
- NBL champion (2014); SBL champion (2014); SEABL champion (2018); SEABL Grand Final MVP (2018); All-SEABL First Team (2017); SEABL scoring champion (2017); All-NBL1 West First Team (2021)

Mathiang Mauot Muo (born 4 March 1987) is an Australian-South Sudanese professional basketball player for the Perth Redbacks of the NBL1 West. He played four seasons of college basketball in the United States between 2009 and 2013 before joining the Perth Wildcats of the National Basketball League (NBL). He was a member of the Wildcats' 2014 championship-winning team but managed just 15 games over two seasons due to injury. Since parting ways with the Wildcats, Muo has had a successful state league career, playing in the SBL, SEABL, NBL1 and Queensland State League (QSL). He won an SBL championship with the East Perth Eagles in 2014 and a SEABL championship with the Hobart Chargers in 2018.

== Early life ==
Muo was born in the Sudanese capital of Khartoum, a city in the heart of the Sudanese civil war in the 1990s. To help himself and his family survive, Muo worked as a domestic cleaner, earning three dollars a day at the age of 10, leaving home for two-month stints before returning to spend a week with his family. In 1998, at the age of 11, Muo, along with six siblings and his mother, Elizabeth, escaped to Egypt as refugees. The family enrolled in a refugee lottery while in Egypt and waited two years to find a new destination. Eventually, Muo's family were given the chance to come to Australia on humanitarian visas, moving to Sydney, where he and his family were able to settle down. Upon arrival in Sydney, Muo began formal education at the age of 13. He spent the first two years in extensive English training and enrolled in high school.

While living in Sydney as a teenager, Muo starting playing basketball for the first time in a local park. As he began to love the sport and realising his natural talent, Muo decided to take the game seriously, partly as a way to keep himself out of trouble. Muo's talents were recognised by a local basketball training centre called Next Level Basketball, where he was introduced to coach Edward Smith. The program began taking trips to the United States and his performances drew attention. In 2005, Muo attempted to finish high school in Florida at Florida Prep but the school went bankrupt before he could graduate. He subsequently moved to The Winchendon School in Boston but left due to differences with the coach. He then moved to The Patterson School in Lenoir, North Carolina, where he finally graduated high school.

== College career ==
Though he received a diploma, Muo did not qualify through the NCAA Clearinghouse and instead attended Quinnipiac University as an international student for one year. He improved his grades enough to qualify and accepted a basketball scholarship worth $60,000 with Northeastern University in 2009, and joined the university's Division 1 college basketball team. As a freshman playing for the Huskies in 2009–10, Muo played 29 games (one start) and averaged 1.8 points and 1.2 rebounds in 8.5 minutes per game.

In 2010, Northeastern University decided Muo did not meet its academic standards and rescinded his scholarship. He subsequently moved to the College of Central Florida, where he played 29 games as a sophomore in 2010–11. In those 29 games, he averaged 13.2 points and 4.0 rebounds per game.

In 2011, Muo once again moved colleges, this time landing at Charleston Southern University and joined the Buccaneers men's basketball team. As a junior in 2011–12, he played 31 games and started all of them, recording averages of 9.8 points, 4.0 rebounds and 1.0 assists in 27.0 minutes per game. As a senior in 2012–13, he became one of the best shooters in school history and the second-best shooter in the Big South Conference, as he shot 41.2% from the three-point line. In 28 games (26 starts), he averaged 11.2 points and 5.1 rebounds in 29.8 minutes per game.

=== College statistics ===
Year	Team	GP	GS	MPG	FG%	3P%	FT%	RPG	APG	SPG	BPG	PPG
2009–10	Northeastern	29	1	8.5	.313	.318	.714	1.2	.2	.3	.1	1.8
2010–11	Central Florida CC	29	–	–	.488	.448	.703	4.0	.9	.7	.2	13.2
2011–12	Charleston Southern	31	31	27.0	.422	.435	.809	4.0	1.0	.7	.3	9.8
2012–13	Charleston Southern	28	26	29.8	.385	.412	.764	5.1	.7	.7	.1	11.2

== Professional career ==
=== Perth Wildcats (2013–2015) ===
==== Injury struck (2013–14) ====
On 7 June 2013, Muo signed a three-year deal with the Perth Wildcats of the National Basketball League. However, on 13 August 2013, he suffered a tear to his left Achilles tendon during the second official training session of the team's pre-season schedule. He was subsequently ruled out for the entire 2013–14 season. He had a strict rehabilitation program that lasted nine months. He attended every training session throughout the 2013–14 season and remained a big part of the Wildcats playing group, and watched on as his team won the NBL championship in April 2014.

==== 2014 off-season ====
On 16 May 2014, Muo joined the East Perth Eagles of the State Basketball League for the rest of the 2014 season. He made his debut for the Eagles the following day in a 97–68 win over the South West Slammers. In 18 minutes of court time, he recorded eight points and four rebounds despite shooting just 3-of-12 from the floor and 2-of-9 from downtown. Muo helped the Eagles finish the regular season in seventh place with a 14–12 record. They went on to advance through to the SBL Grand Final, where they faced the Geraldton Buccaneers. Muo had 12 points in the championship decider, helping the Eagles defeat the Buccaneers 99–83 to claim their first ever SBL championship. In 17 games for the Eagles, he averaged 13.4 points and 4.6 rebounds per game.

On 5 September 2014, Muo took to the court for the first time in a Wildcats singlet, playing in a pre-season game against the SBL All-Stars. He showed signs of being able to make an impact at NBL level, finishing with seven points in 18 minutes of court time in Perth's 98–59 win. Four days later however, the Wildcats opted not to register Muo's contract with the NBL for the 2014–15 season. He continued to train with the team while exploring opportunities elsewhere; the Wollongong Hawks were reportedly on the radar at the time of his release. Later that month, he travelled with the team to Brisbane for the 2014 NBL Pre-season Blitz, and on 18 September 2014, he replaced Earnest Ross in the line-up for the Wildcats' pre-season exhibition match against the Sydney Kings.

==== Injury-replacement player (2014–15) ====
Days after the Wildcats' season-opening home loss to the New Zealand Breakers, back-up forward Greg Hire sustained a calf injury that ruled him out for six weeks. As a result, the Wildcats elevated Muo into the team on a short term injury-replacement contract. He went on to make his long-awaited NBL debut on 17 October 2014 in the Wildcats' 69–59 win over the Wollongong Hawks, recording one turnover in just under two minutes of action. Seven days later, he recorded his first career points in the Wildcats' 84–63 win over the Sydney Kings. He finished the game with 3 points on 1-of-3 shooting. On 9 November 2014, Muo was a spark off the bench for the Wildcats against Melbourne United. Coming on late in the second quarter, he scored 11 points to finish the half and gave the Wildcats a much needed boost, going into half time with a 41–28 lead. The Wildcats held on to the lead in the second half as they won the game 68–59.

On 15 January 2015, Muo's contract was deactivated following Hire's return from injury. He continued to train with the Wildcats for the rest of the season. In 15 games for the Wildcats, Muo averaged 1.9 points per game.

=== Goldfields Giants (2015) ===
On 24 March 2015, Muo signed with the Goldfields Giants for the rest of the 2015 State Basketball League season. Four days later, he made his debut for the Giants, recording 31 points, 17 rebounds, four assists and three steals in a 111–101 loss to the Joondalup Wolves. On 16 May, he scored a season-high 34 points in a 120–92 win over the Mandurah Magic. Despite starting the season losing their first eight games, the Giants surged mid-season to win 14 of their final 18 games, finishing in seventh place with a 14–12 record. The Giants went on to sweep the Geraldton Buccaneers in the quarter-finals, before losing in straight sets to the South West Slammers in the semi-finals. In 26 games for the Giants in 2015, he averaged 21.0 points, 7.5 rebounds, 2.5 assists and 1.7 steals per game.

=== Brisbane Spartans (2016) ===
On 25 February 2016, Muo signed with the Brisbane Spartans for the 2016 SEABL season. He made his debut for the Spartans in the team's season opener on 1 April, recording game highs of 25 points and 11 rebounds in a 73–55 loss to the Geelong Supercats. On 30 April, he scored a season-high 33 points in a 114–71 win over the Sandringham Sabres. He subsequently earned Player of the Week honours for Round 5. On 30 July, he had his second-best scoring performance of the season with 31 points in a 93–81 win over the Albury Wodonga Bandits. He subsequently earned Player of the Week honours for Round 17. The Spartans finished the regular season with a 15–9 record, good for second in the East Conference. Muo helped the Spartans earn a playoff berth for the first time in five years. The Spartans lost their semi-final contest against the first-seeded Bendigo Braves, and then lost their preliminary final match-up with the Nunawading Spectres to bow out of the playoffs with back-to-back losses. In 25 games for the Spartans in 2016, he averaged 18.6 points, 5.7 rebounds and 1.2 assists per game.

On 29 August 2016, Muo suited up for the Brisbane Bullets in their pre-season clash against the UCLA Bruins. The following month, he travelled with the Bullets to New Zealand for pre-season clashes against the New Zealand Breakers. He also competed with the Bullets during the Australian Basketball Challenge, the NBL's official pre-season tournament.

=== Hobart Chargers (2017–2018) ===
In January 2017, Muo signed with the Hobart Chargers for the 2017 season, returning to the SEABL for a second stint. He made his debut for the Chargers in their season opener on 25 March, recording 28 points and 10 rebounds in a 98–41 win over the North-West Tasmania Thunder. On 30 April, he scored 32 points against the Kilsyth Cobras. On 12 May, he scored 35 points against the BA Centre of Excellence. On 19 May, he scored a season-high 38 points in a 117–82 win over the Dandenong Rangers. He subsequently earned Player of the Week honours for Round 8. The Chargers finished the regular season as the second seed in the South Conference with a 16–8 record. On 18 August, the Chargers were knocked out of the playoffs with a 105–98 loss to the Dandenong Rangers in the South Conference Preliminary Final, despite an 18-point effort from Muo. In 25 games for the Chargers in 2017, he averaged 22.1 points, 6.4 rebounds, 1.0 assists and 1.0 steals per game.

On 29 November 2017, Muo re-signed with the Chargers for the 2018 season. He missed a month of action between late May and late June due to a calf injury. On 20 July, he scored a season-high 31 points in a 104–63 win over the North-West Tasmania Thunder. The Chargers finished the regular season in third place with a 15–5 record. They went on to reach the SEABL Grand Final, where they defeated the Nunawading Spectres 72–58 behind Muo's MVP performance of 20 points and 14 rebounds. In 18 games for the Chargers in 2018, he averaged 18.3 points, 5.4 rebounds and 1.0 assists per game.

=== Hobart Huskies and Bendigo Braves (2019) ===
On 19 December 2018, Muo signed with the Southern Huskies for the 2019 New Zealand NBL season. However, he was unable to play for the team due to roster restrictions with imports. After playing briefly with the Southern Huskies' NBL1 affiliate team, the Hobart Huskies, he signed with the Bendigo Braves on 23 April 2019 for the rest of the inaugural NBL1 season. He recorded 25 points and seven rebounds in the preliminary final to help the Braves reach the NBL1 Grand Final. In the grand final, the Braves lost 99–90 to the Nunawading Spectres despite Muo's 23 points. In 19 games for Bendigo, he averaged 20.3 points, 5.2 rebounds and 1.9 assists per game.

=== Geraldton Buccaneers and South West Metro Pirates (2020–2022) ===
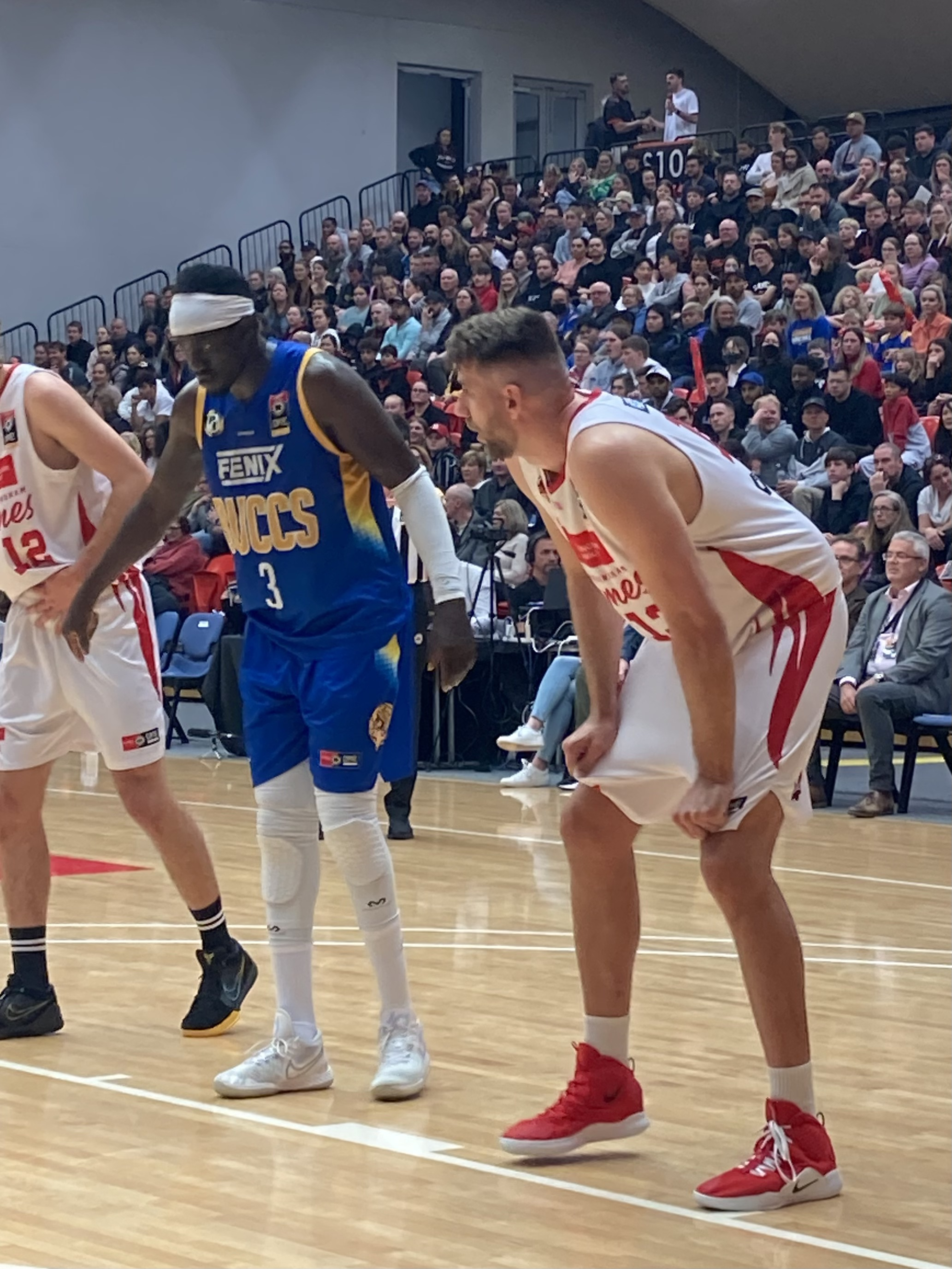
Muo in September 2022 during the NBL1 West Grand Final. Alongside him is his former Perth Wildcats and East Perth Eagles teammate Tom Jervis.

On 6 March 2020, Muo signed with the Geraldton Buccaneers of the State Basketball League for the 2020 season. After the SBL season was cancelled due to the COVID-19 pandemic, Muo played for the South West Metro Pirates in the 2020 Queensland State League (QSL) season. He averaged 12.5 points and 4.17 rebounds with the Pirates.

On 6 February 2021, Muo re-signed with the Geraldton Buccaneers for the 2021 NBL1 West season. In his debut for the Buccaneers on 8 May, he recorded 12 points and 13 rebounds in a 103–69 loss to the Goldfields Giants. On 5 June, he scored 41 points in an 86–71 win over the Mandurah Magic. He scored 37 points the following day in a 94–74 loss to the Kalamunda Eastern Suns. He was subsequently named Player of the Week for round 8. On 27 June, he scored 44 points in a 105–83 loss to the Perth Redbacks. He left the Buccaneers on 5 August 2021 for national team duties with South Sudan. In 17 games, he averaged 23.05 points, 8.29 rebounds, 2.94 assists and 1.47 steals per game.

On 3 February 2022, Muo re-signed with the Buccaneers for the 2022 NBL1 West season. On 21 May, he scored 35 points in a 111–85 win over the Mandurah Magic. He helped the Buccaneers reach the grand final, where they were defeated by the Rockingham Flames 91–79. In 21 games, he averaged 16.52 points, 4.71 rebounds, 2.1 assists and 1.29 blocks per game.

=== Joondalup Wolves (2023) ===
On 24 March 2023, Muo signed with the Joondalup Wolves for the 2023 NBL1 West season. He helped the Wolves reach the grand final, where they were defeated by the Geraldton Buccaneers 86–80. Muo had six points on 2-of-11 shooting off the bench. In 22 games, he averaged 14.5 points, 4.5 rebounds and 1.4 assists per game.

=== South West Slammers (2024) ===
In April 2024, Muo joined the South West Slammers for the 2024 NBL1 West season. In 19 games, he averaged 10.58 points, 5.21 rebounds and 1.47 assists per game.

=== Perth Redbacks (2025–present) ===
In April 2025, Muo joined the Perth Redbacks for the 2025 NBL1 West season.

== National team career ==
In July 2016, Muo was selected to represent South Sudan in the first World Indigenous Basketball Challenge. The 16-team tournament was held in Vancouver, Canada, from 10–13 August. Muo helped South Sudan reach the championship game, where they defeated Lords of the Plains 98–91 to complete a 4–0 run. As a result, Muo was named tournament MVP.

In March 2017, Muo represented South Sudan in their debut at the AfroBasket Zone Five qualifiers in Cairo, Egypt. In their fifth/sixth playoff game against Kenya, Muo scored 34 points.

At the FIBA AfroBasket 2021, Muo averaged 10.8 points, 5.0 rebounds and 1.3 steals in four games for South Sudan.

In August 2023, Muo was named in the South Sudan squad for the 2023 FIBA World Cup.
