= 2020 NBL1 season =

- League: NBL1
- Sport: Basketball
- Duration: Season that was scheduled: 14 March – 30 August (Conference seasons); 4–6 September (NBL1 finals series)
- Teams: 18 (South Conference); 13 (North Conference); 10 (Central Conference)

NBL1 seasons
- ← 2019 2021 →

The 2020 NBL1 season was due to be the second season of the NBL1 and the first to consist of multiple conferences and National participation.

After consisting of one conference in 2019, the 2020 NBL1 season saw South (Victoria and Tasmania) joined by North (Queensland) and Central (South Australia). Due to the COVID-19 pandemic, the season was cancelled before it started.

== Background ==
After a successful first season in 2019, the National Basketball League (NBL) expanded the NBL1 in 2020 by introducing Basketball Victoria's inaugural 2019 league and teams as the new South Conference and partnering with Basketball Queensland and Basketball South Australia to make the Queensland Basketball League (QBL) and South Australian Premier League the new North and Central conferences.

The season was scheduled to begin on 14 March for the Central Conference, 18 April for the South Conference and 24 April for the North Conference. After conference finals in August, it was scheduled that clubs from all three conferences would converge on the State Basketball Centre in Melbourne in the first weekend of September for the NBL1 finals series.

Due to the COVID-19 pandemic, the league announced on 18 March that the start of the season was delayed until mid May. However, six days later, the entire season for all three conferences was cancelled.

== Clubs ==
=== South Conference ===
Club	City	State	Arena
Albury Wodonga Bandits	Albury	New South Wales	Lauren Jackson Sports Centre
Ballarat Rush (Women) Ballarat Miners (Men)	Ballarat	(Victoria (state)) Victoria	MARS Minerdome
Bendigo Braves	Bendigo	(Victoria (state)) Victoria	Bendigo Stadium
Dandenong Rangers	Melbourne	(Victoria (state)) Victoria	Dandenong Stadium
Diamond Valley Eagles	Melbourne	(Victoria (state)) Victoria	Diamond Valley Sports and Fitness Centre
Eltham Wildcats	Melbourne	(Victoria (state)) Victoria	Eltham High School
Frankston Blues	Melbourne	(Victoria (state)) Victoria	Frankston Stadium
Geelong Supercats	Geelong	(Victoria (state)) Victoria	Geelong Arena
Hobart Chargers	Hobart	Tasmania	Kingborough Sports Centre
Kilsyth Cobras	Melbourne	(Victoria (state)) Victoria	Kilsyth Sports Centre
Knox Raiders	Melbourne	(Victoria (state)) Victoria	State Basketball Centre
Launceston Tornadoes (Women)	Launceston	Tasmania	Elphin Sports Centre
Melbourne Tigers	Melbourne	(Victoria (state)) Victoria	Melbourne Sports and Aquatic Centre
Mount Gambier Pioneers	Mount Gambier	South Australia	Bern Bruning Stadium
North-West Tasmania Thunder (Men)	Ulverstone	Tasmania	Ulverstone Sports and Leisure Centre
Nunawading Spectres	Melbourne	(Victoria (state)) Victoria	Nunawading Basketball Centre
Ringwood Hawks	Melbourne	(Victoria (state)) Victoria	The Rings
Sandringham Sabres	Melbourne	(Victoria (state)) Victoria	Nunn Media Basketball Centre
Waverley Falcons	Melbourne	(Victoria (state)) Victoria	Waverley Basketball Centre

=== North Conference ===
Club	City	State	Arena
Brisbane Capitals	Brisbane	Queensland	Auchenflower Stadium
Cairns Dolphins (Women) Cairns Marlins (Men)	Cairns	Queensland	Early Settler Stadium
Gold Coast Rollers	Gold Coast	Queensland	Carrara Indoor Stadium
Ipswich Force	Ipswich	Queensland	Llewellyn Stadium
Logan Thunder	Logan	Queensland	Cornubia Park Sports Stadium
Mackay Meteorettes (Women) Mackay Meteors (Men)	Mackay	Queensland	McDonald's Mackay Stadium
Rockhampton Cyclones (Women) Rockhampton Rockets (Men)	Rockhampton	Queensland	Adani Arena Rockhampton
Southern Districts Spartans	Brisbane	Queensland	Rowland Cowan Stadium
South West Metro Pirates	Brisbane	Queensland	Hibiscus Stadium
Sunshine Coast Phoenix	Sunshine Coast	Queensland	Maroochydore Stadium
Toowoomba Mountaineers	Toowoomba	Queensland	Clive Berghofer Recreation Centre
Townsville Flames (Women) Townsville Heat (Men)	Townsville	Queensland	Townsville StarFM Stadium
USC Rip City	Sunshine Coast	Queensland	USC Sports Stadium

=== Central Conference ===
Club	City	State	Arena
Central Districts Lions	Adelaide	South Australia	STARplex
Eastern Mavericks	Mount Barker	South Australia	St Francis de Sales Community Sports Centre
Forestville Eagles	Adelaide	South Australia	Wayville Sports Centre
North Adelaide Rockets	Adelaide	South Australia	The Lights Community and Sports Centre
Norwood Flames	Adelaide	South Australia	The ARC
South Adelaide Panthers	Adelaide	South Australia	Marion Basketball Centre
Southern Tigers	Adelaide	South Australia	Morphett Vale Stadium
Sturt Sabres	Adelaide	South Australia	Springbank Sports Centre
West Adelaide Bearcats	Adelaide	South Australia	Port Adelaide Recreation Centre
Woodville Warriors	Adelaide	South Australia	St Clair Recreation Centre
