= Australian Basketball Association =

Association of semi-professional basketball leagues in Australia

Australian Basketball Association (ABA)
- Formerly: South Eastern Basketball League; 1981–1987; South East Australian Basketball League; 1988–1991; Continental Basketball Association; 1992–1998; Australian Basketball Association; 1999–2008
- Sport: Basketball
- Founded: 1981
- First season: 1981
- Folded: 2008
- Country: Australia
- Continent: FIBA Oceania (Oceania)
- Level on pyramid: 2
- Related competitions: Big V Central ABL; QBL; SEABL; Waratah League

The Australian Basketball Association (ABA) was a semi-professional basketball competition in Australia. The competition had five leagues under its banner during the 2000s operating as conferences: South East Australian Basketball League (SEABL), Queensland Basketball League (QBL), Central Australian Basketball League (Central ABL), Big V and Waratah League. The ABA's roots can be traced back as far as 1965 and operated under many different names and structures until 2008.

== History ==
In 1965, the South Eastern Conference (SEC) was established. The SEC continued until 1971 when the Australian Club Championships gained pre-eminence. The Australian Club Championships ceased operations after 1980 due to the rise of Australia's first truly national competition, the National Basketball League (NBL).

In 1981, the SEC was reborn as the South Eastern Basketball League (SEBL). The competition was known as SEBL for seven seasons until being officially known as the South East Australian Basketball League (SEABL) from 1988 to 1991. The competition became known as the Continental Basketball Association (CBA), and in 1994 it merged with the Queensland Basketball League (QBL) to grow to three conferences: North, South and East. In 1998, the CBA saw further expansion with the inclusion of a Central Conference from South Australia.

The CBA was restructured as the Australian Basketball Association (ABA) in 1999, and over the next two years, the Big V from Victoria (2000) and the Waratah League from New South Wales (2001) joined the ABA.

Starting in 2002, the champions of each of the six conferences and a number of wildcard entries competed at the annual ABA National Finals. In 2007, Basketball Australia took over as operators of the ABA. A brand change saw the Australian Club Championships (ACC) operate as the national finals series in 2007 and 2008.

The ABA and ACC was abandoned following the 2008 season, resulting in the SEABL, QBL, Central ABL, Big V and Waratah League continuing on as independent leagues.

== List of National champions ==
=== Men ===
Teams	Win	Loss	Total	Year(s) won	Year(s) lost
Ballarat Miners	3	3	6	1989, 1994, 1995	1990, 1991, 1992
Cairns Marlins	3	2	5	1998, 2004, 2007	1994, 1997
Geelong Cats/Supercats	3	0	3	1981, 1999, 2006	—
Bulleen Boomers	2	3	5	1984, 1990	1983, 1985, 1988
Bendigo Braves	2	1	3	1988, 2005	1989
Hobart Chargers	2	1	3	2000, 2002	2008
Frankston Bears/Blues	1	3	4	1982	1981, 1995, 1998
Kilsyth Cobras	1	2	3	1985	1999, 2000
Sydney City Slickers/Sydney City Comets/Sydney Comets	1	2	3	1992	1986, 2005
Melbourne Tigers	1	1	2	1983	1982
Newcastle Hunters	1	1	2	1986	1987
Knox Raiders	1	1	2	1991	1996
North-West Tasmania Originals/Thunder	1	1	2	1996	2004
Adelaide Buffalos	1	0	1	1987	—
North East Melbourne Arrows	1	0	1	1993	—
Suncoast Clippers	1	0	1	1997	—
Mount Gambier Pioneers	1	0	1	2003	—
Rockhampton Rockets	1	0	1	2008	—
Dandenong Rangers	0	2	2	—	2006, 2007
Chelsea Gulls	0	1	1	—	1984
Murray Bridge Bullets	0	1	1	—	1993
Australian Institute of Sport	0	1	1	—	2002

=== Women ===
Teams	Win	Loss	Total	Year(s) won	Year(s) lost
Bayside/Frankston Blues	3	3	6	1993, 1997, 2004	1991, 1992, 1994
Knox Raiders	3	2	5	1992, 1994, 1996	1998, 2005
Bendigo Braves	2	1	3	2000, 2003	2006
Townsville Sunbirds/Flames	2	1	3	2007, 2008	1997
Dandenong Rangers	2	0	2	1990, 1991	—
Kilsyth Cobras	2	0	2	1998, 2002	—
Ballarat Miners	2	0	2	2005, 2006	—
Launceston Tornadoes	1	1	2	1995	1996
Southern Districts Spartans	1	0	1	1999	—
Sturt Sabres	0	2	2	—	1990, 2002
Broadmeadows Broncos	0	1	1	—	1993
Adelaide Opals	0	1	1	—	1995
Norwood Flames	0	1	1	—	1999
Nunawading Spectres	0	1	1	—	2000
Forestville Eagles	0	1	1	—	2003
North Adelaide Rockets	0	1	1	—	2004
Hume City Broncos	0	1	1	—	2007
Sydney Comets	0	1	1	—	2008

== See also ==
- Basketball in Australia
- List of developmental and minor sports leagues
