= Chloe Bibby =

Australian basketball player (born 1998)

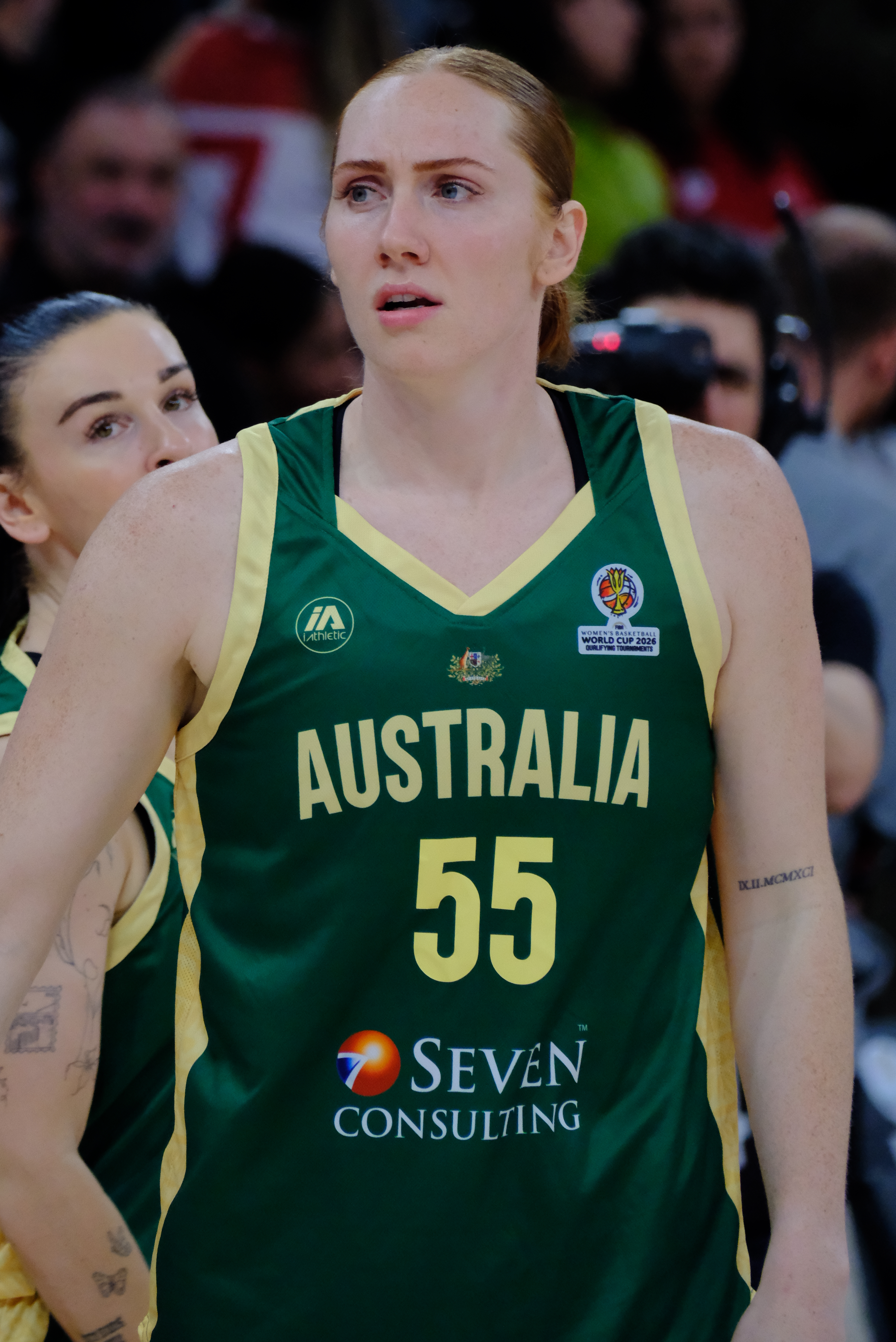
- Bibby with Australia in 2026

No. 55 – Minnesota Lynx
- Position: Forward / Stretch four
- League: WNBA

Personal information
- Born: 15 June 1998 (age 28) Horsham, Victoria, Australia
- Listed height: 188 cm (6 ft 2 in)
- Listed weight: 88 kg (194 lb)

Career information
- High school: Warracknabeal (Warracknabeal, Victoria); Rowville (Melbourne, Victoria)
- College: Mississippi State (2017–2020); Maryland (2020–2022)
- WNBA draft: 2022: undrafted
- Playing career: 2013–present

Career history
- 2013–2017: Dandenong Rangers (WNBL)
- 2015–2016: Dandenong Rangers (SEABL)
- 2017: Bendigo Braves
- 2022: Kilsyth Cobras
- 2022–2023: Perth Lynx
- 2023: Frankston Blues
- 2023–2024: AZS AJP Gorzów Wielkopolski
- 2024: Ballarat Miners
- 2024–present: Uni Girona CB
- 2025: Golden State Valkyries
- 2025: Indiana Fever
- 2026: Chicago Sky
- 2026–present: Minnesota Lynx

Career highlights
- 2× SEABL champion (2015, 2016); Polish League MVP (2024); 2× NBL1 South All-Star Five (2023, 2024); All-SEABL First Team (2017); SEABL Youth Player of the Year (2017); Second-team All-Big Ten (2022)
- Stats at Basketball Reference

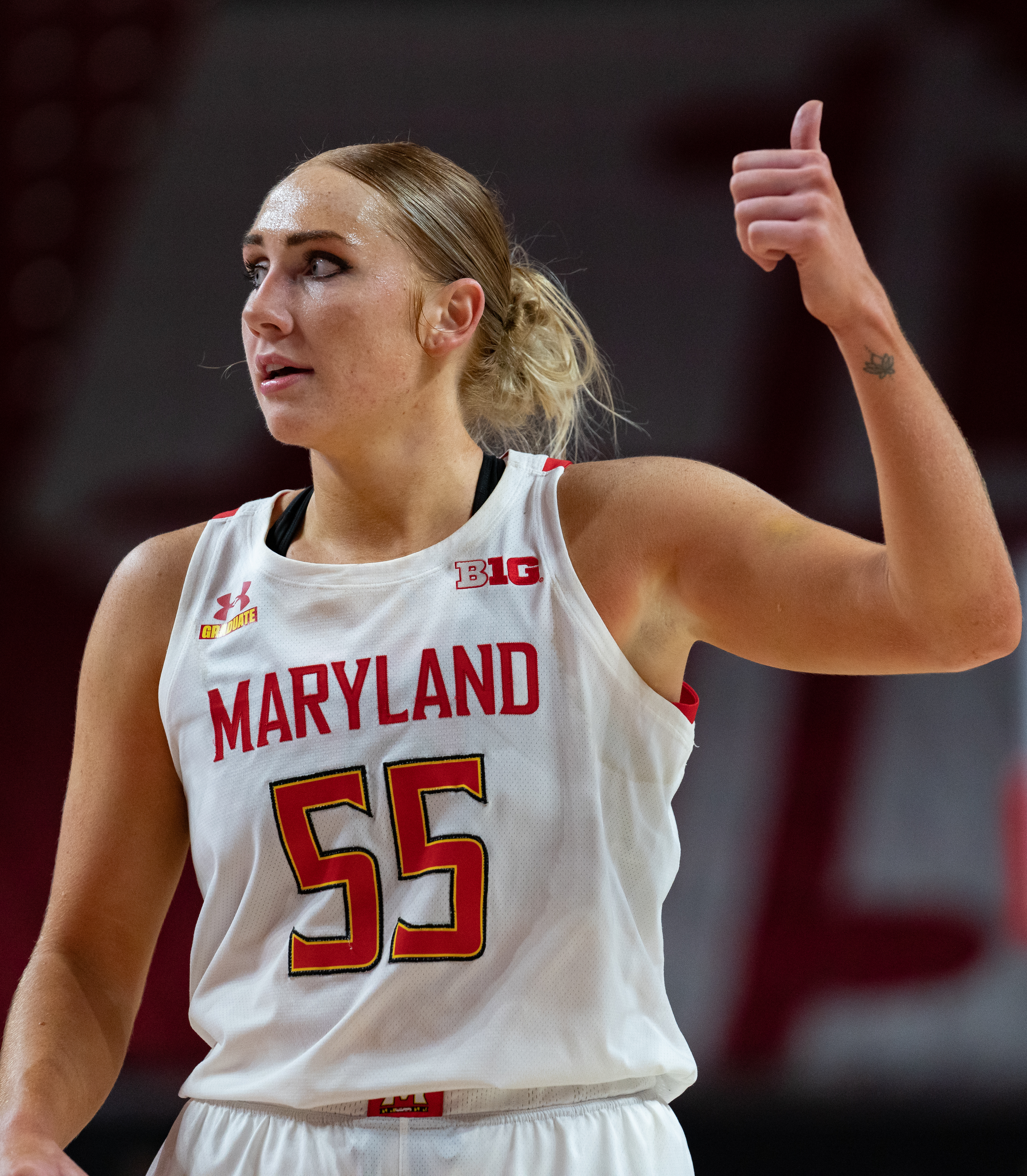
Bibby with Maryland in 2021

Chloe Louise Bibby (born 15 June 1998) is an Australian professional basketball player for the Minnesota Lynx of the Women's National Basketball Association (WNBA) and for Uni Girona CB of the Liga Femenina de Baloncesto. She played college basketball for the Mississippi State Bulldogs and the Maryland Terrapins.

Chloe attended Rowville Secondary College, Melbourne, Australia, as part of the Rowville Sports Academy's Basketball program, graduating at the end of 2016.

== Career ==
=== WNBL ===
Bibby made her WNBL debut with the Dandenong Rangers during the 2013–14 season. She played her fourth and final season with the Rangers in 2016–17.

On 2 August 2022, Bibby signed with the Perth Lynx for the 2022–23 WNBL season.

=== Australian state leagues ===
In 2015 and 2016, Bibby played for the Dandenong Rangers in the SEABL. She helped the Rangers win SEABL championships both years. In 2017, she joined the Bendigo Braves and helped them reach the SEABL grand final.

In 2022, Bibby played for the Kilsyth Cobras of the NBL1 South. She joined the Frankston Blues for the 2023 NBL1 South season and earned NBL1 South All-Star Five honours. With the Ballarat Miners in 2024, she was again named NBL1 South All-Star Five.

=== College ===
In 2017, Bibby moved to the United States to play college basketball for the Mississippi State Bulldogs. In 2020, she transferred to Maryland, where she played two seasons.

=== WNBA ===
Bibby went undrafted in the 2022 WNBA draft, but right after the draft she signed a training camp contract with the Minnesota Lynx. On 2 May, she was waived by the Lynx.

On 5 February 2025, Bibby signed a training camp contract with the Golden State Valkyries. On 14 May, she was waived by the Valkyries. On 15 June, Bibby re-signed with Golden State. She made her debut on 17 June, in an 88–77 victory over the Indiana Fever, scoring 12 points in 24 minutes off the bench. On 30 June, she was waived by the team after appearing in 5 games, averaging 6.4 points and 2.8 rebounds per game.

On 25 July 2025, the Indiana Fever signed Bibby to a seven-day contract. On 1 August, Bibby was signed for the remainder of the season with the Fever. Before the Fever's 22 August game, Bibby was listed as "out" on the injury report for the first time this season with a left knee injury. Bibby would not return to play and was ruled out for the remainder of the season on 4 September. Fever head coach Stephanie White stated that same day to the press that Bibby's knee became swollen with their travel and they had, "not been able to get the swelling reduced...[and she was] definitely not going to be ready by the end of the season."

On April 3, 2026, she was drafted 11th overall by the Portland Fire in the 2026 WNBA expansion draft, acquiring her from the Indiana Fever.

On May 6, 2026, the Phoenix Mercury announced that they had acquired Bibby from the Portland Fire via trade. However, she was waived by the Mercury within 48 hours, making her an unrestricted free agent.

On June 30, 2026, Bibby signed a player development contract with the Chicago Sky, following the team's promotion of Aicha Coulibaly to a full contract.

Bibby received a standard contract offer from the Minnesota Lynx on July 31, 2026. After the Chicago Sky declined to match the offer, she signed a rest-of-season contract with the Lynx the following day.

=== Europe ===
For the 2023–24 season, Bibby joined AZS AJP Gorzów Wielkopolski of the Polish Basket Liga Kobiet. In her only season at the club, she became the league's Most Valuable Player, averaging 20.9 points and 5.9 rebounds domestically, and 22 points, 7.7 rebounds, and 2.2 steals in EuroCup Women.

In June 2024, Bibby signed with Uni Girona CB of the Liga Femenina de Baloncesto for the 2024–25 season. Girona won the regular season, and Bibby was named the league’s MVP, averaging 18.4 points, 4.9 rebounds, and 2.2 assists per game. Since Girona's regular season title secured direct qualification to the 2025–26 EuroLeague Women, Bibby was allowed to leave the team before the playoffs to join a WNBA training camp. Bibby re-signed with Girona for the 2025–26 season. She missed the start of the season due to a knee injury sustained during the 2025 WNBA season.

== National team ==
Bibby made her international debut, representing Australia at the 2014 FIBA Under-17 World Championship in the Czech Republic. Australia finished in fifth place. With the Gems, Bibby won Gold at the 2016 FIBA Oceania Under-18 Championship, qualifying for the 2017 World Championship in Italy.

In May 2025, Bibby was named in the Opals squad for the 2025 FIBA Women's Asia Cup in China.

In July 2026, Bibby was named in the final Opals squad for the 2026 FIBA Women's Basketball World Cup.

== Career statistics ==
Legend
GP	Games played	GS	Games started	MPG	Minutes per game	RPG	Rebounds per game
APG	Assists per game	SPG	Steals per game	BPG	Blocks per game	PPG	Points per game
TO	Turnovers per game	FG%	Field-goal percentage	3P%	3-point field-goal percentage	FT%	Free-throw percentage
**Bold**	Career best	°	League leader

*	Led NCAA Division I

=== WNBA ===
==== Regular season ====
WNBA regular season statistics
Year	Team	GP	GS	MPG	FG%	3P%	FT%	RPG	APG	SPG	BPG	TO	PPG
2025	Golden State	5	0	**13.2**	.407	**.421**	**1.000**	**2.8**	.6	**.6**	.0	**.0**	**6.4**
2025	Indiana	**9**	0	9.8	.357	.391	.857	1.2	.4	.6	.1	.8	3.9
2026	Chicago	4	0	12.8	.400	.333	**1.000**	.5	**1.5**	.5	.3	.5	5.5
2026	Minnesota	5	0	11.2	**.421**	.375	—	1.4	.4	.0	**.4**	1.4	4.4
**Career**	2 years, 4 teams	23	0	11.3	.394	.386	.909	1.5	.7	.4	.2	.7	4.8

==== Playoffs ====
WNBA playoff statistics
Year	Team	GP	GS	MPG	FG%	3P%	FT%	RPG	APG	SPG	BPG	TO	PPG
2025	Indiana	Did not play (injury)											
2026	Minnesota	1	0	2.0	.500	.333	—	.0	.0	.0	.0	.0	5.0
**Career**		1	0	2.0	.500	.333	—	.0	.0	.0	.0	.0	5.0

=== College ===
NCAA statistics
Year	Team	GP	GS	MPG	FG%	3P%	FT%	RPG	APG	SPG	BPG	TO	PPG
2017–18	Mississippi State	**37**	0	13.6	.377	.319	.818	2.1	.4	.4	.1	.9	3.9
2018–19	Mississippi State	19	18	26.1	**.481**	**.450**	.852	3.9	1.5	.8	**.5**	1.5	11.3
2019–20	Mississippi State	33*	31	23.0	.404	.317	.769	5.2	.9	.6	.2	**.7**	7.5
2020–21	Maryland	29	29	29.9	.445	.361	**.868**	**6.0**	**2.1**	1.2	**.5**	.9	**13.2**
2021–22	Maryland	32	**32**	**33.0**	.425	.340	.833	5.4	1.5	**1.4**	.3	1.6	11.9
Career		150	110	24.5	.428	.355	.836	4.5	1.2	.9	.3	1.1	9.2
