= Cameron Rigby =

Australian basketball player

Personal information
- Born: 1 May 1978 (age 47) Melbourne, Victoria, Australia
- Listed height: 201 cm (6 ft 7 in)
- Listed weight: 115 kg (254 lb)

Career information
- College: Bradley (1996–1997); San Diego (1998–2001)
- NBA draft: 2001: undrafted
- Playing career: 1999–2011
- Position: Forward

Career history
- 1999–2000: Ballarat Miners
- 2001: Knox Raiders
- 2001–2003: Canberra Cannons
- 2002: Diamond Valley Eagles
- 2003: Hobart Chargers
- 2003–2004: Hunter Pirates
- 2004: Dandenong Rangers
- 2004–2005: Wollongong Hawks
- 2005: Mildura Mavericks
- 2005–2007: West Sydney Razorbacks
- 2007–2008: Bendigo Braves
- 2007–2008: Wollongong Hawks
- 2009–2011: Knox Raiders

Career highlights
- SEABL East champion (2004); 2× SEABL East Grand Final MVP (2004, 2005); All-SEABL East Team (2008)

Cameron Rigby (born 1 May 1978) is an Australian former professional basketball player.

== Early life ==
Rigby was born in Melbourne, Victoria, and played junior basketball at Diamond Valley Basketball Association.

== College career ==
Rigby played four seasons of college basketball in the United States, first for the Bradley Braves in 1996–97 before sitting out a season and then playing three years for the San Diego Toreros between 1998 and 2001.

== Professional career ==
=== NBL ===
Rigby played seven seasons in the Australian National Basketball League (NBL) between 2001 and 2008. His first stint was with the Canberra Cannons (2001–03), then Hunter Pirates (2003–04), Wollongong Hawks (2004–05), West Sydney Razorbacks (2005–07), and then a final season back at Wollongong in 2007–08. He helped the Hawks reach the 2005 NBL Grand Final series and won the Hawks Most Improved team award that year.

=== SEABL and Big V ===
Rigby played in the South East Australian Basketball League (SEABL) between 1999 and 2011. He also played in the Big V in 2002 for the Diamond Valley Eagles.

In 2004, Rigby helped the Dandenong Rangers win the SEABL Eastern Conference championship, averaging 18.8 points per game and claiming the Grand Final MVP. He claimed SEABL East Grand Final MVP again in 2005 despite his Mildura Mavericks losing to the Geelong Supercats. He was named to the All-SEABL East Conference team in 2008 with the Bendigo Braves.
