= 2019 NBL1 season =

- League: NBL1
- Sport: Basketball
- Duration: 29 March – 21 July (Regular season); 27 July – 17 August (Finals)
- Teams: 18

Regular season
- Minor premiers: M: Ballarat Miners; W: Bendigo Braves
- Season MVP: M: Demarcus Gatlin (Geelong Supercats); W: Kelly Wilson (Bendigo Braves)

Finals
- Champions: M: Nunawading Spectres; W: Kilsyth Cobras
- Runners-up: M: Bendigo Braves; W: Geelong Supercats
- Grand Final MVP: M: Dain Swetalla (Nunawading Spectres); W: Lauren Nicholson (Kilsyth Cobras)

NBL1 seasons
- 2020 →

The 2019 NBL1 season was the inaugural season of the NBL1. The season began on 29 March and concluded on 17 August with grand final day for both the men's and women's seasons.

The NBL1 in 2019 was a single league and consisted of one conference run by Basketball Victoria. The teams, mostly from Victoria and Tasmania, would go on to make up the NBL1 South in 2020 after the inclusion of multiple new conferences.

== Background ==
Basketball Victoria introduced a new senior elite league in 2019 called NBL1 after partnering with the National Basketball League (NBL).

The former teams from the South East Australian Basketball League (SEABL) were part of the inaugural NBL1 season, while Eltham Wildcats, Knox Raiders, Ringwood Hawks and Waverley Falcons joined from the Big V. The 2018 SEABL champions, the Hobart Chargers, chose not to enter the NBL1 in 2019. They were replaced by the Hobart Huskies.

== Clubs ==
Club	City	Arena
Albury Wodonga Bandits	Albury, New South Wales	Lauren Jackson Sports Centre
BA Centre of Excellence	Canberra, Australian Capital Territory	AIS Basketball Centre
Ballarat Rush (Women); Ballarat Miners (Men)	Ballarat, Victoria	MARS Minerdome
Bendigo Braves	Bendigo, Victoria	Bendigo Stadium
Dandenong Rangers	Melbourne, Victoria	Dandenong Stadium
Diamond Valley Eagles	Melbourne, Victoria	Diamond Valley Sports and Fitness Centre
Eltham Wildcats	Melbourne, Victoria	Eltham High School
Frankston Blues	Melbourne, Victoria	Frankston Stadium
Geelong Supercats	Geelong, Victoria	Geelong Arena
Hobart Huskies	Hobart, Tasmania	Kingborough Sports Centre
Kilsyth Cobras	Melbourne, Victoria	Kilsyth Sports Centre
Knox Raiders	Melbourne, Victoria	State Basketball Centre
Launceston Tornadoes (Women)	Launceston, Tasmania	Elphin Sports Centre
Melbourne Tigers	Melbourne, Victoria	Melbourne Sports and Aquatic Centre
North-West Tasmania Thunder (Men)	Ulverstone, Tasmania	Schweppes Arena
Nunawading Spectres	Melbourne, Victoria	Nunawading Basketball Centre
Ringwood Hawks	Melbourne, Victoria	The Rings
Sandringham Sabres	Melbourne, Victoria	Nunn Media Basketball Centre
Waverley Falcons	Melbourne, Victoria	Waverley Basketball Centre

== Regular season ==
=== Standings ===
Men's ladder

Pos
Pos	Team	W	L
1	Ballarat Miners	16	4
2	Frankston Blues	14	6
3	Nunawading Spectres	14	6
4	Kilsyth Cobras	12	8
5	Melbourne Tigers	12	8
6	Geelong Supercats	12	8
7	Dandenong Rangers	11	9
8	Bendigo Braves	11	9
9	Hobart Huskies	10	10
10	Waverley Falcons	10	10
11	Diamond Valley Eagles	9	11
12	Albury Wodonga Bandits	8	12
13	North-West Tasmania Thunder	8	12
14	Knox Raiders	8	12
15	BA Centre of Excellence	8	12
16	Ringwood Hawks	6	14
17	Eltham Wildcats	6	14
18	Sandringham Sabres	5	15

Women's ladder

Pos
Pos	Team	W	L
1	Bendigo Braves	19	1
2	Geelong Supercats	17	3
3	Ringwood Hawks	15	5
4	Kilsyth Cobras	14	6
5	Knox Raiders	14	6
6	Nunawading Spectres	12	8
7	Waverley Falcons	11	9
8	Dandenong Rangers	11	9
9	Eltham Wildcats	10	10
10	Albury Wodonga Bandits	9	11
11	Frankston Blues	9	11
12	Ballarat Rush	8	12
13	Melbourne Tigers	8	12
14	BA Centre of Excellence	6	14
15	Hobart Huskies	6	14
16	Sandringham Sabres	4	16
17	Launceston Tornadoes	4	16
18	Diamond Valley Eagles	3	17

== Finals ==
=== Men's bracket ===
Qualifying and elimination finals
Jul 27, Ballarat Minerdome
1	Ballarat Miners	80
4	Kilsyth Cobras	66
Jul 28, MSAC
5	Melbourne Tigers	76
8	Bendigo Braves	86
Jul 27, Geelong Arena
6	Geelong Supercats	85
7	Dandenong Rangers	79
Jul 27, Frankston Basketball Stadium
2	Frankston Blues	107
3	Nunawading Spectres	97

Semi-finals
Aug 4, Kilsyth Sports Centre
Kilsyth Cobras	104
Bendigo Braves	115
Aug 3, Nunawading Basketball Centre
Nunawading Spectres	82
Geelong Supercats	76

Preliminary finals
Aug 10, Ballarat Minerdome
Ballarat Miners	68
Nunawading Spectres	75
Aug 10, Frankston Basketball Stadium
Frankston Blues	67
Bendigo Braves	85

Grand final
Aug 17, State Basketball Centre
Nunawading Spectres	99
Bendigo Braves	90

=== Women's bracket ===
Qualifying and elimination finals
Aug 2, Bendigo Stadium
1	Bendigo Braves	70
4	Kilsyth Cobras	85
Aug 3, State Basketball Centre
5	Knox Raiders	86
8	Dandenong Rangers	65
Aug 3, Nunawading Basketball Centre
6	Nunawading Spectres	89
7	Waverley Falcons	61
Aug 3, Geelong Arena
2	Geelong Supercats	78
3	Ringwood Hawks	63

Semi-finals
Aug 4, Bendigo Stadium
Bendigo Braves	82
Knox Raiders	65
Aug 4, The Rings
Ringwood Hawks	73
Nunawading Spectres	97

Preliminary finals
Aug 10, Kilsyth Sports Centre
Kilsyth Cobras	82
Nunawading Spectres	59
Aug 11, Geelong Arena
Geelong Supercats	83
Bendigo Braves	80

Grand final
Aug 17, State Basketball Centre
Geelong Supercats	76
Kilsyth Cobras	86

== Awards ==
- Men's Most Valuable Player: Demarcus Gatlin (Geelong Supercats)
- Women's Most Valuable Player: Kelly Wilson (Bendigo Braves)
- Men's Grand Final MVP: Dain Swetalla (Nunawading Spectres)
- Women's Grand Final MVP: Lauren Nicholson (Kilsyth Cobras)
- Men's Defensive Player of the Year: Dane Pineau (Melbourne Tigers)
- Women's Defensive Player of the Year: Lauren Nicholson (Kilsyth Cobras)
- Men's Youth Player of the Year: Alex Ducas (BA Centre of Excellence)
- Women's Youth Player of the Year: Anneli Maley (Diamond Valley Eagles)
- Men's Coach of the Year: Andrew Harms (Frankston Blues)
- Women's Coach of the Year: Tim Mottin (Ringwood Hawks)
- Club of the Year: Bendigo Braves
- Men's Referee of the Year: Andrew Hollowood
- Women's Referee of the Year: Tayla Flint
- Men's All-Star Five:
  - Demarcus Gatlin (Geelong Supercats)
  - Ray Turner (Bendigo Braves)
  - Jerry Evans Jr. (Ballarat Miners)
  - Dane Pineau (Melbourne Tigers)
  - Simon Conn (Nunawading Spectres)
- Women's All-Star Five:
  - Kelly Wilson (Bendigo Braves)
  - Lauren Nicholson (Kilsyth Cobras)
  - Rebecca Cole (Dandenong Rangers)
  - Lauren Scherf (Knox Raiders)
  - Ezi Magbegor (Geelong Supercats)
