= Lauren Scherf =

Australian basketball player (born 1996)

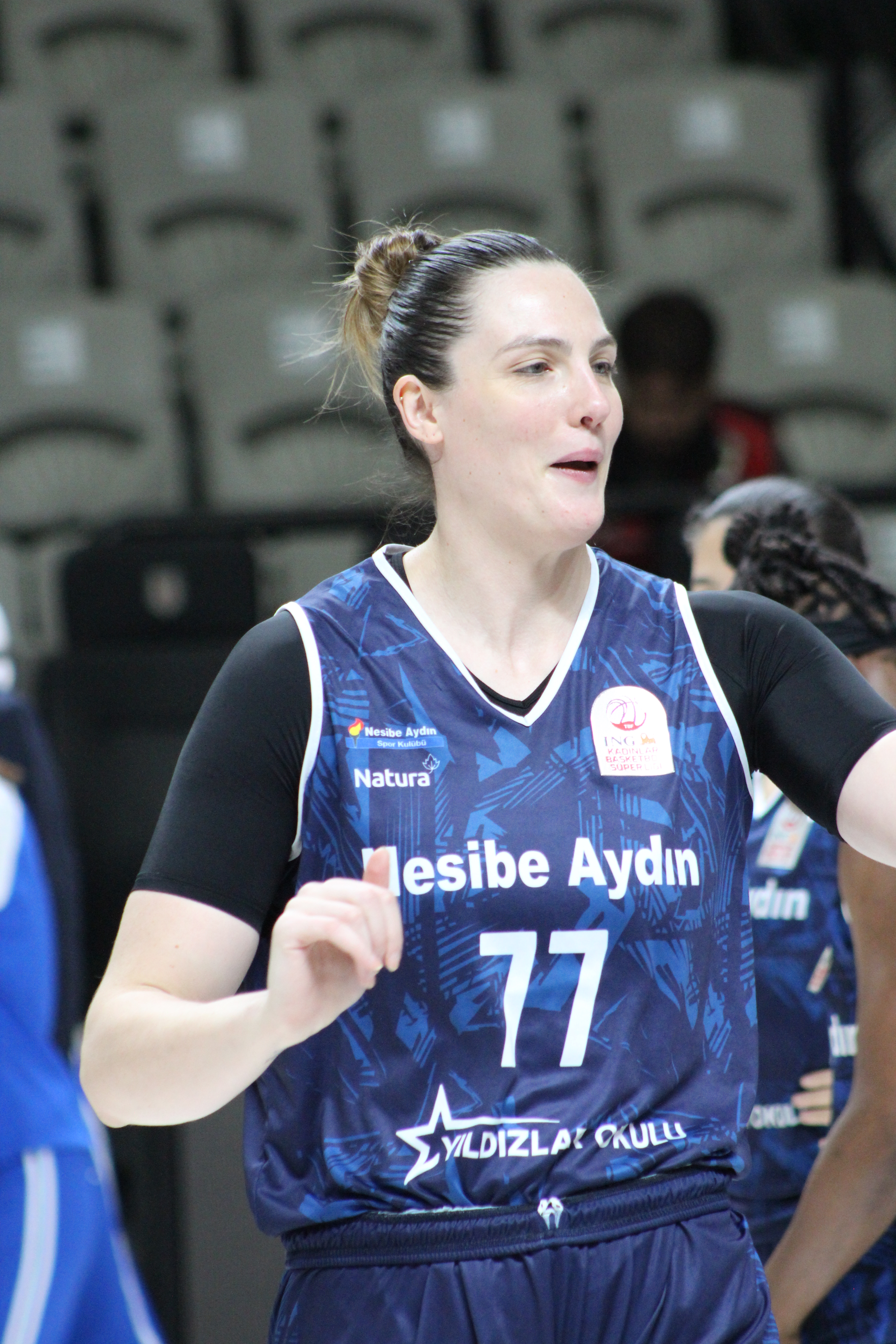
- Scherf with Nesibe Aydın GSK in 2024

No. 11 – Crvena zvezda
- Position: Power forward / Centre
- League: Basketball League of Serbia; EuroLeague Women

Personal information
- Born: 7 March 1996 (age 30) Melbourne, Victoria, Australia
- Listed height: 196 cm (6 ft 5 in)

Career information
- Playing career: 2012–present

Career history
- 2012: Melbourne Tigers
- 2013–2017: Dandenong Rangers (SEABL)
- 2013–2017: Dandenong Rangers (WNBL)
- 2017–2019: Canberra Capitals
- 2018: Diamond Valley Eagles
- 2019: Knox Raiders
- 2019–2020: Sydney Uni Flames
- 2021–2022: Kilsyth Cobras
- 2021–2023: Perth Lynx
- 2023: Campobasso
- 2023: Perth Redbacks
- 2023–2024: Flammes Carolo Basket
- 2024–2025: Frankston Blues
- 2024–2025: Nesibe Aydın GSK
- 2025–2026: Botaş SK
- 2026: Fuerza Regia
- 2026–present: Crvena zvezda

Career highlights
- WNBL champion (2019); All-WNBL Second Team (2023); WNBL Rookie of the Year (2015); 2× SEABL champion (2015, 2016); NBL1 All-Star Five (2019)
Medals
Women's basketball
Representing Australia
FIBA Asia Cup
Bronze medal – third place	2021 Jordan
Bronze medal – third place	2023 Australia
Summer Universiade
Gold medal – first place	2017 Taiwan	Team
Gold medal – first place	2019 Italy	Team
FIBA U19 World Championship
Bronze medal – third place	2013 Lithuania	Team
Bronze medal – third place	2015 Russia	Team
FIBA Oceania Junior Championships
Gold medal – first place	2011 Canberra	U17 Team
Gold medal – first place	2014 Suva	U19 Team
Commonwealth Games
Bronze medal – third place	2022 Birmingham	3x3

Lauren Marie Scherf (born 7 March 1996) is an Australian-Latvian professional basketball player.

== Early life ==
Scherf was born in Melbourne, Victoria, in the suburb of East Melbourne.

== Professional career ==
=== WNBL ===
Scherf debuted in the Women's National Basketball League (WNBL) in the 2013–14 season with the Dandenong Rangers. She played four seasons with the Rangers, where she won the WNBL Rookie of the Year Award in the 2014–15 season.

Between 2017 and 2019, Scherf played for the Canberra Capitals. She then played two seasons with the Sydney Uni Flames in 2019–20 and the 2020 Hub season.

Scherf joined the Perth Lynx for the 2021–22 WNBL season. She returned to the Lynx for the 2022–23 season. On 7 January 2023, she had 33 points and 14 rebounds in a 75–64 win over the Sydney Flames, with 27 of her points coming in the first half. Later that month, she played her 200th WNBL game.

=== State Leagues ===
In 2012, Scherf played for the Melbourne Tigers in the Big V. Between 2013 and 2017, she played for the Dandenong Rangers in the South East Australian Basketball League (SEABL). She won SEABL championships with the Rangers in 2015 and 2016. In 2018, she played for the Diamond Valley Eagles in the SEABL. In 2019, she played for the Knox Raiders in the NBL1 and earned All-Star Five honours. In 2021 and 2022, she played for the Kilsyth Cobras in the NBL1 South. In 2023, she had a four-game stint with the Perth Redbacks in the NBL1 West. In 2024, she played for the Frankston Blues in the NBL1 South. She returned to the Blues for the 2025 NBL1 South season.

=== Italy, France and Turkey ===
In March 2023, Scherf joined Magnolia La Molisana Campobasso of the Italian Lega Basket Femminile.

For the 2023–24 season, Scherf joined Flammes Carolo Basket of the Ligue Féminine.

For the 2024–25 season, Scherf joined Nesibe Aydın GSK of the Turkish Super League.

== National team career ==
Scherf has represented Australia at the 2011 FIBA Oceania Under-16 Championship, 2012 FIBA Under-17 World Championship, 2013 FIBA Under-19 World Championship (winning bronze), 2013 Australian Youth Olympic Festival (winning gold), 2014 FIBA Oceania Under-18 Championship, 2015 FIBA Under-19 World Championship, 2021 FIBA Women's Asia Cup, and the 2023 FIBA Women's Asia Cup.

In April 2025, Scherf was named in the Opals squad for a trans-Tasman series against New Zealand in May.

== Personal life ==
Scherf holds a Latvian passport thanks to her paternal grandmother. She played under her Latvian name, Lorena Marija Serfa, in Turkey during the 2024–25 season.
