= Kyle Adnam =

Australian basketball player (born 1993)

No. 5 – Illawarra Hawks
- Position: Point guard
- League: NBL

Personal information
- Born: 18 November 1993 (age 33) Melbourne, Victoria, Australia
- Listed height: 186 cm (6 ft 1 in)
- Listed weight: 84 kg (185 lb)

Career information
- High school: Mount Lilydale Mercy College (Melbourne, Victoria)
- Playing career: 2013–present

Career history
- 2013–2014: Adelaide 36ers
- 2014–2016: Kilsyth Cobras
- 2014–2015: Wollongong Hawks
- 2015–2018: Melbourne United
- 2017–2018: Nelson Giants
- 2018–2019: Sydney Kings
- 2019–2023: South East Melbourne Phoenix
- 2022: Fraser Valley Bandits
- 2023: Wellington Saints
- 2023: CSU Sibiu
- 2024: Illawarra Hawks
- 2024: Kilsyth Cobras
- 2024–2026: Cairns Taipans
- 2025: Southern Districts Spartans
- 2026: Sandringham Sabres
- 2026: Hawke's Bay Hawks
- 2026–present: Illawarra Hawks

Career highlights
- NBL champion (2018); All-SEABL Team (2015); 2× SEABL Youth Player of the Year (2014, 2015)

Kyle Reginaid Adnam (born 18 November 1993) is an Australian professional basketball player for the Illawarra Hawks of the National Basketball League (NBL). He has played consistently in the NBL since 2013 with the Adelaide 36ers, Illawarra Hawks, Melbourne United, Sydney Kings, South East Melbourne Phoenix and Cairns Taipans.

== Early life ==
Adnam was born and raised in the Melbourne suburb of Lilydale. He attended Mount Lilydale Mercy College and played junior basketball for the Mt. Evelyn Meteors. In 2013, Adnam played in the Victorian Youth Championship (VYC) for the Kilsyth Cobras, a season which culminated in him scoring 37 points in the VYC Grand Final, to lead the Cobras to victory. He subsequently earned VYC All-Star Five honours and was named the league MVP. In 24 games for the Cobras in 2013, he averaged 17.7 points, 5.0 rebounds, 4.1 assists and 1.4 steals per game.

== Professional career ==
=== NBL ===
For the 2013–14 NBL season, Adnam joined the Adelaide 36ers as a development player. He appeared in three games for the 36ers in 2013–14, scoring a total of four points. He continued on as a development player in the 2014–15 NBL season with the Wollongong Hawks. He appeared in six games for the Hawks in 2014–15, scoring a total of eight points.

Adnam was a development player for a third season in 2015–16 with Melbourne United. On 12 February 2016, he scored a team-high 16 points in 28 minutes off the bench in a 100–63 loss to the New Zealand Breakers. He appeared in eight games for United in 2015–16, averaging 2.3 points per game. Adnam re-joined Melbourne United as a development player for the 2016–17 NBL season. On 4 November 2016, he scored a team-high 19 points off the bench in a 98–92 overtime loss to the Breakers. He appeared in 20 games for United in 2016–17, averaging 3.6 points and 1.2 assists per game.

For the 2017–18 NBL season, Adnam was elevated to United's full-time roster. On 14 October 2017, he scored a career-high 23 points with six 3-pointers in a 99–79 win over the Adelaide 36ers. He helped United win the 2018 NBL championship and averaged 3.5 points per game in 30 games.

After attending an NBA mini-camp run by the Dallas Mavericks during the 2018 off-season, Adnam joined the Sydney Kings for the 2018–19 NBL season. The Kings finished the regular season in third place with an 18–10 record before losing 2–0 to Melbourne United in the semi-finals, despite Adnam's equal team-high 13 points off the bench in game two. He appeared in all 30 games for the Kings in 2018–19, averaging 6.7 points, 1.1 rebounds and 1.3 assists per game.

For the 2019–20 NBL season, Adnam joined the inaugural roster of the South East Melbourne Phoenix. He averaged career highs across the board and played every game the season had to offer.

For the 2020–21 NBL season, Adnam was named co-captain of the Phoenix and helped them reach the semi-finals. He set another career-best season averaging 12.6 points and 3.6 assists. In March 2021, he scored a then career-high 28 points.

On 22 June 2021, Adnam re-signed with the Phoenix on a two-year deal.

On 1 October 2022, Adnam scored a career-high 30 points in an 84–79 win over the Tasmania JackJumpers.

On 16 January 2024, Adnam signed with the Illawarra Hawks for the rest of the 2023–24 NBL season as an injury replacement for Dan Grida, returning to the franchise for a second stint.

On 7 August 2024, Adnam signed with the Cairns Taipans for the 2024–25 NBL season. Two weeks later, he dislocated his kneecap at training and was sidelined for four to six weeks. He returned to action in late September and made his Taipans debut. He averaged 5.6 points and 2.5 assists in 24 appearances.

On 31 March 2025, Adnam re-signed with the Taipans for the 2025–26 NBL season. In October 2025, he played his 250th NBL game. On 13 November 2025, he was ruled out for round nine after hyperextending his knee at training.

On 3 August 2026, Adnam signed with the Illawarra Hawks as a Nominated Replacement Player for the 2026–27 NBL season, returning to the club for a third stint.

=== Canada and Romania ===
In May 2022, Adnam joined the Fraser Valley Bandits of the Canadian Elite Basketball League (CEBL).

On 6 July 2023, Adnam signed with CSU Sibiu of the Romanian Liga Națională for the 2023–24 season. He parted ways with the team on 2 December 2023. In six league games, he averaged 11.8 points, 1.3 rebounds and 2.5 assists per game. He also played in three FIBA Europe Cup games.

=== State leagues and New Zealand NBL ===
Adnam played for the Kilsyth Cobras of the South East Australian Basketball League (SEABL) in 2014, 2015 and 2016. He was named SEABL Youth Player of the Year in 2014 and 2015, as well as All-SEABL Team in 2015.

In March 2017, Adnam joined the Nelson Giants of the New Zealand National Basketball League (NZNBL) for the 2017 season. He suffered toe and quad muscle injuries during the season. In 11 games, he averaged 16.6 points, 2.5 rebounds and 4.6 assists per game.

Adnam returned to the Nelson Giants for the 2018 New Zealand NBL season. In 18 games, he averaged 19.2 points, 2.8 rebounds, 5.7 assists and 2.1 steals per game.

On 28 February 2023, Adnam signed with the Wellington Saints for the 2023 New Zealand NBL season. An adductor injury saw him play just 56 seconds in his debut for the Saints. On 7 May, he had 19 points and 18 assists in a 110–98 win over the Southland Sharks.

On 28 March 2024, Adnam signed with the Kilsyth Cobras of the NBL1 South for the 2024 season.

Adnam joined the Southern Districts Spartans of the NBL1 North for the 2025 season.

On 27 March 2026, Adnam signed with the Sandringham Sabres of the NBL1 South. He appeared in two games to begin the 2026 NBL1 season before signing with the Hawke's Bay Hawks on 8 April. After appearing in three games to start the 2026 New Zealand NBL season, he returned to the Sabres. On 17 July 2026, Adnam scored 70 points with 13 3-pointers in the Sabres' 130–80 win over the Northern Force, surpassing Anneli Maley's previous mark of 65 points for the highest individual score in an NBL1 game ever.

== National team career ==
In June 2017, Adnam was selected in the Australian Emerging Boomers squad for the Summer Universiade in Taipei.

Adnam played for the Australia men's national basketball team during the 2022 FIBA Asia Cup qualifiers in 2021 and the 2023 FIBA Basketball World Cup Asian qualifiers.

== Personal life ==
Adnam's younger brother, Jorden, has also played for the Kilsyth Cobras.

While playing for the Sydney Kings, Adnam was studying online for a Bachelor of Business (Sports Management) at Deakin University.
