= List of ABA National Champions =

The champion teams of the Australian Basketball Association (ABA) National Finals were determined by grand final championship games at the conclusion of the finals weekend.

The men's and women's champion from each ABA conference alongside a number of wildcard teams competed at the ABA National Finals every year between 1981 and 2008 except for 2001 when the event was cancelled due to the collapse of Ansett Australia. The ABA National Finals were known as the Australian Club Championships (ACC) in 2007 and 2008. The ABA and ACC was abandoned following the 2008 season.

== Conferences ==
The ABA was established in 1981 and operated under many different names and structures until 2008.

The conferences included:

- South East Australian Basketball League (SEABL), 1981–2008
- Queensland Basketball League (QBL), 1994–2008
- Central Australian Basketball League (Central ABL), 1998–2008
- Big V, 2000–2008
- Waratah League, 2001–2008

== Champions ==
=== Men ===
Year	Venue	Champion	GF result	Runner-up	MVP	Ref
1981	Albert Park	Geelong Cats (SEABL)	97 – 88	Frankston Bears (SEABL)		
1982	Albert Park	Frankston Bears (SEABL)	89 – 87	Melbourne Tigers (SEABL)		
1983	Albert Park	Melbourne Tigers (SEABL)	114 – 102	Bulleen Boomers (SEABL)		
1984	Coburg	Bulleen Boomers (SEABL)	109 – 108	Chelsea Gulls (SEABL)		
1985	Kilsyth	Kilsyth Cobras (SEABL)	98 – 87	Bulleen Boomers (SEABL)		
1986	Bendigo	Newcastle Hunters (SEABL)	124 – 117 (OT)	Sydney City Slickers (SEABL)		
1987	Devonport	Adelaide Buffalos (SEABL)	124 – 102	Newcastle Hunters (SEABL)		
1988	Broadmeadows	Bendigo Braves (SEABL)	121 – 118	Bulleen Boomers (SEABL)		
1989	Kilsyth	Ballarat Miners (SEABL)	125 – 119	Bendigo Braves (SEABL)		
1990	Boronia (Knox)	Bulleen Boomers (SEABL)	128 – 101	Ballarat Miners (SEABL)		
1991	Boronia (Knox)	Knox Raiders (SEABL)	81 – 79	Ballarat Miners (SEABL)		
1992	Boronia (Knox)	Sydney City Comets (SEABL)	117 – 90	Ballarat Miners (SEABL)		
1993	Keilor	North East Melbourne Arrows (SEABL)	124 – 113	Murray Bridge Bullets (SEABL)		
1994	Bendigo	Ballarat Miners (SEABL)	104 – 81	Cairns Marlins (QBL)	Eric Hayes (Ballarat)	
1995	Liverpool	Ballarat Miners (SEABL)	101 – 86	Frankston Blues (SEABL)	Grant Keys (Ballarat)	
1996	Devonport	North-West Tasmania Originals (SEABL)	101 – 88	Knox Raiders (SEABL)	Dave Biwer (NW Tasmania)	
1997	Geelong	Suncoast Clippers (QBL)	80 – 78	Cairns Marlins (QBL)	Billy Ross (Suncoast)	
1998	Gold Coast	Cairns Marlins (QBL)	88 – 74	Frankston Blues (SEABL)	Chris Sneed (Cairns)	
1999	Canberra	Geelong Supercats (SEABL)	98 – 78	Kilsyth Cobras (SEABL)	Rodney Walker (Geelong)	
2000	Bendigo	Hobart Chargers (SEABL)	76 – 75	Kilsyth Cobras (SEABL)	Ben Harvey (Hobart)	
2001	Not held (Note: The 2001 National Finals were scheduled for Bendigo, however it was cancelled due to the collapse of Ansett Australia.)					
2002	Bendigo	Hobart Chargers (SEABL)	98 – 93	Australian Institute of Sport (SEABL)	Andrew Beattie (Hobart)	
2003	Bendigo	Mount Gambier Pioneers (SEABL)	127 – 113	Ballarat Miners (SEABL)	Kurt Russell (Mount Gambier)	
2004	Geelong	Cairns Marlins (QBL)	104 – 100	North-West Tasmania Thunder (SEABL)	Aaron Grabau (Cairns)	
2005	Geelong	Bendigo Braves (SEABL)	102 – 98	Sydney Comets (Waratah League)	Jason Cameron (Bendigo)	
2006	Newcastle	Geelong Supercats (SEABL)	94 – 80	Dandenong Rangers (Big V)	Ash Cannan (Dandenong)	
2007	MSAC	Cairns Marlins (QBL)	110 – 98	Dandenong Rangers (Big V)	Aaron Grabau (Cairns)	
2008	MSAC	Rockhampton Rockets (QBL)	103 – 99	Hobart Chargers (SEABL)	Ryan McDade (Rockhampton)	

==== Results by teams ====
Teams	Win	Loss	Total	Year(s) won	Year(s) lost
Ballarat Miners	3	3	6	1989, 1994, 1995	1990, 1991, 1992
Cairns Marlins	3	2	5	1998, 2004, 2007	1994, 1997
Geelong Cats/Supercats	3	0	3	1981, 1999, 2006	—
Bulleen Boomers	2	3	5	1984, 1990	1983, 1985, 1988
Bendigo Braves	2	1	3	1988, 2005	1989
Hobart Chargers	2	1	3	2000, 2002	2008
Frankston Bears/Blues	1	3	4	1982	1981, 1995, 1998
Kilsyth Cobras	1	2	3	1985	1999, 2000
Sydney City Slickers/Sydney City Comets/Sydney Comets	1	2	3	1992	1986, 2005
Melbourne Tigers	1	1	2	1983	1982
Newcastle Hunters	1	1	2	1986	1987
Knox Raiders	1	1	2	1991	1996
North-West Tasmania Originals/Thunder	1	1	2	1996	2004
Adelaide Buffalos	1	0	1	1987	—
North East Melbourne Arrows	1	0	1	1993	—
Suncoast Clippers	1	0	1	1997	—
Mount Gambier Pioneers	1	0	1	2003	—
Rockhampton Rockets	1	0	1	2008	—
Dandenong Rangers	0	2	2	—	2006, 2007
Chelsea Gulls	0	1	1	—	1984
Murray Bridge Bullets	0	1	1	—	1993
Australian Institute of Sport	0	1	1	—	2002

==== Results by conference ====
Team	Win	Loss	Total	Year(s) won	Year(s) lost
SEABL	22	22	44	1981, 1982, 1983, 1984, 1985, 1986, 1987, 1988, 1989, 1990, 1991, 1992, 1993, 1994, 1995, 1996, 1999, 2000, 2002, 2003, 2005, 2006	1981, 1982, 1983, 1984, 1985, 1986, 1987, 1988, 1989, 1990, 1991, 1992, 1993, 1995, 1996, 1998, 1999, 2000, 2002, 2003, 2004, 2008
QBL	5	2	7	1997, 1998, 2004, 2007, 2008	1994, 1997
Big V	0	2	2		2006, 2007
Waratah League	0	1	1		2005
Central ABL	0	0	0		

=== Women ===
Year	Venue	Champion	GF result	Runner-up	MVP	Ref
1990	Boronia (Knox)	Dandenong Rangers (SEABL)	92 – 56	Sturt Sabres (SEABL)		
1991	Boronia (Knox)	Dandenong Rangers (SEABL)	110 – 64	Bayside Blues (SEABL)		
1992	Boronia (Knox)	Knox Raiders (SEABL)	92 – 69	Bayside Blues (SEABL)		
1993	Keilor	Frankston Blues (SEABL)	100 – 85	Broadmeadows Broncos (SEABL)		
1994	Bendigo	Knox Raiders (SEABL)	99 – 79	Frankston Blues (SEABL)		
1995	Liverpool	Launceston Tornadoes (SEABL)	110 – 96	Adelaide Opals (SEABL)		
1996	Devonport	Knox Raiders (SEABL)	86 – 85	Launceston Tornadoes (SEABL)		
1997	Geelong	Frankston Blues (SEABL)	98 – 69	Townsville Sunbirds (QBL)		
1998	Gold Coast	Kilsyth Cobras (SEABL)	87 – 69	Knox Raiders (SEABL)		
1999	Canberra	Southern Districts Spartans (QBL)	79 – 69	Norwood Flames (Central ABL)		
2000	Bendigo	Bendigo Braves (SEABL)	77 – 56	Nunawading Spectres (SEABL)	Kristi Harrower (Bendigo)	
2001	Not held					
2002	Bendigo	Kilsyth Cobras (SEABL)	103 – 94 (OT)	Sturt Sabres (Central ABL)	Jessica Mahony (Sturt)	
2003	Bendigo	Bendigo Braves (SEABL)	91 – 66	Forestville Eagles (Central ABL)	Larissa Cavanagh (Bendigo)	
2004	Geelong	Frankston Blues (SEABL)	69 – 66	North Adelaide Rockets (Central ABL)	Erin Phillips (North Adelaide)	
2005	Geelong	Ballarat Miners (SEABL)	77 – 53	Knox Raiders (SEABL)	Andrea McMahon (Ballarat)	
2006	Newcastle	Ballarat Miners (SEABL)	69 – 66	Bendigo Braves (SEABL)	Karen Ashby (Ballarat)	
2007	MSAC	Townsville Flames (QBL)	92 – 49	Hume City Broncos (Big V)	Rohanee Cox (Townsville)	
2008	MSAC	Townsville Flames (QBL)	73 – 57	Sydney Comets (Waratah League)	Cherie Smith (Townsville)	

==== Results by teams ====
Teams	Win	Loss	Total	Year(s) won	Year(s) lost
Bayside/Frankston Blues	3	3	6	1993, 1997, 2004	1991, 1992, 1994
Knox Raiders	3	2	5	1992, 1994, 1996	1998, 2005
Bendigo Braves	2	1	3	2000, 2003	2006
Townsville Sunbirds/Flames	2	1	3	2007, 2008	1997
Dandenong Rangers	2	0	2	1990, 1991	—
Kilsyth Cobras	2	0	2	1998, 2002	—
Ballarat Miners	2	0	2	2005, 2006	—
Launceston Tornadoes	1	1	2	1995	1996
Southern Districts Spartans	1	0	1	1999	—
Sturt Sabres	0	2	2	—	1990, 2002
Broadmeadows Broncos	0	1	1	—	1993
Adelaide Opals	0	1	1	—	1995
Norwood Flames	0	1	1	—	1999
Nunawading Spectres	0	1	1	—	2000
Forestville Eagles	0	1	1	—	2003
North Adelaide Rockets	0	1	1	—	2004
Hume City Broncos	0	1	1	—	2007
Sydney Comets	0	1	1	—	2008

==== Results by conference ====
Team	Win	Loss	Total	Year(s) won	Year(s) lost
SEABL	15	11	26	1990, 1991, 1992, 1993, 1994, 1995, 1996, 1997, 1998, 2000, 2002, 2003, 2004, 2005, 2006	1990, 1991, 1992, 1993, 1994, 1995, 1996, 1998, 2000, 2005, 2006
QBL	3	1	4	1999, 2007, 2008	1997
Central ABL	0	4	4		1999, 2002, 2003, 2004
Big V	0	1	1		2007
Waratah League	0	1	1		2008

== Historical records ==
The ABA's roots can be traced back as far as 1965 when the South Eastern Conference (SEC) was established. The SEC continued until 1971 when the Australian Club Championships gained pre-eminence. The Australian Club Championships ceased operations after 1980 due to the rise of Australia's first truly national competition, the National Basketball League (NBL).

Melbourne Church of England, later becoming Melbourne Tigers, won the SEC in each of its six seasons.

Years	Champion	Ref
1965–70	Melbourne Church of England	
1971–80	League abandoned due to annual Australian Club Championships	

== See also ==
- List of SEABL champions
