= Joe Hurst =

American-Australian basketball player

Personal information
- Born: February 4, 1964 (age 62)
- Listed height: 6 ft 6 in (1.98 m)

Career information
- College: Northwest Missouri State (1982–1986)
- NBA draft: 1986: undrafted
- Playing career: 1987–2006
- Position: Forward

Career history
- 1987: Quad City Thunder
- 1988–1989: Hobart Devils
- 1990–1991: Hobart Hornets
- 1992: Devonport
- 1992: Hobart Devils
- 2001: Canberra Cannons
- 2001–2006: Mildura Mavericks

Career highlights
- NBL Most Valuable Player (1988); All-NBL Second Team (1988)

Joe Lewis Hurst (born February 4, 1964) is an American-Australian former professional basketball player. He is a native of East St. Louis, Illinois.

== College career ==
Between 1982 and 1986, Hurst played college basketball at Northwest Missouri State University for the Bearcats. He was first-team All-MIAA in 1984 and 1985. He suffered an ankle injury in his final year. He left Northwest in the top five in both career scoring (1,580 points) and rebounding (777). He also set the all-time mark for blocked shots with 153.

== Professional career ==
Hurst had a brief stint in 1987 with the Quad City Thunder of the Continental Basketball Association.

Hurst debuted in the National Basketball League (NBL) in Australia in 1988 with the Hobart Devils. He was named NBL Most Valuable Player but earned selection to the All-NBL Second Team.

Hurst returned to the Devils in 1989 and then played for the Hobart Hornets in the SEABL in 1990 and 1991. In 1992, he split the year with Devonport in the SEABL and the Devils in NBL.

Throughout the rest of the 1990s, Hurst played in Iceland, Sweden and France, and also played in the Queensland Basketball League (QBL).

In February 2001, Hurst joined the Canberra Cannons in the NBL for a two-game stint.

Between 2001 and 2006, Hurst played in the SEABL for the Mildura Mavericks.

== Personal life ==
Hurst's daughter Ahlise is also a basketball player.

Hurst holds dual American and Australian citizenship.
