= Mel Dalgleish =

Australian basketball player

Personal information
- Born: 24 January 1959 (age 67)
- Listed height: 198 cm (6 ft 6 in)
- Position: Power forward

Career history

Playing
- 1983–1984: Frankston Bears
- 1984–1985: Bendigo Braves
- 1986–1988: Canberra Cannons

Coaching
- 1984–1985: Bendigo Braves
- 1991: Canberra Cannons

Career highlights
- 1988 NBL championship

Mel Dalgleish (born 24 January 1959) is an Australian basketball player who played in the National Basketball League (NBL) for the Frankston Bears and the Canberra Cannons. At international level, he competed in the men's tournament at the 1980 Summer Olympics and the 1984 Summer Olympics.

== Playing career ==
=== Club career ===
Dalgleish played in the Australian National Basketball League (NBL) in two stints. He played for Frankston Bears in 1983 and 1984. In 1984, he moved to South Eastern Basketball League (SEBL) team Bendigo Braves as a player-coach. In 1986, Dalgleish returned to the NBL, signing with Canberra Cannons. In 1987, Dalgleish took on an administrative role with the Cannons, working in promotions.

In 1988, Dalgleish retired after playing in the Cannons' championship-winning team.

=== International career ===
In 1980, Dalgleish played seven matches for Australia at the 1980 Summer Olympics. He returned in 1984, where he played eight times.

== Coaching ==
Dalgleish took over as head coach of the Canberra Cannons for the 1991 NBL season, replacing his 1980 Olympic teammate Steve Breheny. He resigned at the end of the season after the Cannons finished 10th with a 9–17 win-loss record.
