= Kilsyth Cobras =

- Leagues: NBL1 South
- Founded: 1984
- History: Men: Kilsyth Cobras; 1984–present Women: Kilsyth Cobras; 1990–present
- Arena: Kilsyth Sports Centre
- Location: Kilsyth, Victoria
- Team colors: Red, black, white
- CEO: Will van Poppel
- Chairman: Mal Allison (ESD)
- President: Wendy Noyes (K&MDBA)
- Head coach: M: Zach Moult; W: Emilee Whittle-Harmon
- Championships: Men: ABA (1): 1985; Women: ABA (2): 1998; 2002; SEABL (3): 1998; 2002; 2008; NBL1 (1): 2019
- Conference titles: Men: SEABL (1): 1999; Women: SEABL (2): 2015; 2016
- Website: NBL1.com.au

Kilsyth Cobras is a NBL1 South club based in Melbourne, Victoria. The club fields a team in both the Men's and Women's NBL1 South. The club is a division of Kilsyth and Mountain District Basketball Association Inc. (K&MDBA), the major administrative basketball organisation in the Shire of Yarra Ranges. The Cobras play their home games at Kilsyth Sports Centre.

== Club history ==
=== Background ===
Kilsyth and Mountain District Basketball Association Inc. (K&MDBA) was established in 1963. In 1987, Eastern Sports Development Ltd (ESD) was established to serve as the management body of Kilsyth Basketball.

=== SEABL ===
In 1984, the Kilsyth Cobras men's team debuted in the South East Australian Basketball League (SEABL). In 1985, the Cobras finished fourth in the SEABL regular season and went on to reach the ABA National grand final, where they won the National championship with a victory over the Bulleen Boomers.

In 1990, the Cobras were inaugural members of the SEABL women's competition. In 1997, the women's team made their first SEABL grand final and finished runners-up to the Frankston Blues. In 1998, the women's team won the SEABL championship and the ABA National championship. They went on to finish as SEABL runners-up again in 1999.

In 1999, the men's team won the SEABL East Conference championship but went on to lose in the ABA National grand final to the Geelong Supercats. In 2000, the men's team finished second in the South Conference and went on to reach the ABA National grand final, where they lost to the Hobart Chargers.

In 2002, the women's team won the SEABL championship and the ABA National championship. In 2003, the women's team lost in the SEABL grand final to the Bendigo Braves. In 2005 and 2007, the men's team lost in the South Conference grand final to the Braves. In 2008, the women's team won their third SEABL championship.

In 2015 and 2016, the women's team won back-to-back South Conference titles but lost both years in the SEABL grand final to the Dandenong Rangers.

=== NBL1 ===
After the demise of the SEABL following the 2018 season, a new competition known as NBL1 debuted in 2019 with the Cobras playing in the inaugural season. The women's team reached the grand final, where they defeated the Geelong Supercats 86–76 to win the NBL1 championship. Cobras guard Lauren Nicholson was named grand final MVP. The NBL1 South season did not go ahead in 2020 due to the COVID-19 pandemic.
