= NBL1 South =

Australian semi-professional basketball league

- Current season, competition or edition: 2026 NBL1 season
- Sport: Basketball
- Founded: 2019
- First season: 2019
- No. of teams: M: 19; W: 19
- Country: Australia
- Continent: FIBA Oceania (Oceania)
- Most recent champions: M: Frankston Blues (1st title); W: Knox Raiders (2nd title)
- Most titles: M: Multiple (1 title); W: Knox Raiders (2 titles)
- Website: NBL1.com.au/South

NBL1 South is a semi-professional basketball league in Victoria and Tasmania, Australia, comprising both a men's and women's competition. In 2019, Basketball Victoria partnered with the National Basketball League (NBL) to create NBL1. NBL1 South was the lone conference in 2019, with North, Central, West and East joining over the proceeding three years. Due to the COVID-19 pandemic, the NBL1 South did not have a season in 2020 and only half a season in 2021.

== History ==
In October 2018, following the demise of the South East Australian Basketball League (SEABL), Basketball Victoria announced a new senior elite league to take the reins as Australia's pre-eminent semi-professional basketball league. All Victorian-based SEABL teams joined the new league, while Eltham Wildcats, Knox Raiders, Ringwood Hawks and Waverley Falcons also joined the league from the Big V. The North-West Tasmania Thunder men and Launceston Tornadoes women also kept their place, as did the BA Centre of Excellence. In February 2019, the league was named NBL1 after Basketball Victoria partnered with the National Basketball League (NBL).

The NBL1 in 2019 was a single league and consisted of one conference. After a successful first season, the NBL expanded the NBL1 in 2020 by introducing Basketball Victoria's inaugural 2019 league and teams as the new South Conference and partnering with Basketball Queensland and Basketball South Australia to make the Queensland Basketball League (QBL) and South Australian Premier League the new North and Central conferences. However, due to the COVID-19 pandemic, the 2020 season was cancelled for all three conferences.

On 1 September 2021, the 2021 NBL1 South season was cancelled due to the COVID-19 pandemic in Victoria. With a combined 154 men's and women's games that could not be completed, it was decided to abandon the season with no champions and no individual awards.

For the 2026 season, the NBL1 South Finals series expanded from 8 to 10 teams for the first time.

== Current clubs ==
Colours	Club	City	State	Arena	Joined NBL1 South
	Ballarat Miners	Ballarat	(Victoria (state)) Victoria	Ballarat Sports Events Centre	2019
	Bendigo Braves	Bendigo	(Victoria (state)) Victoria	Bendigo Stadium	2019
	Casey Cavaliers	Melbourne	(Victoria (state)) Victoria	Casey Stadium	2022
	Dandenong Rangers	Melbourne	(Victoria (state)) Victoria	Dandenong Stadium	2019
	Diamond Valley Eagles	Melbourne	(Victoria (state)) Victoria	Diamond Valley Sports and Fitness Centre	2019
	Eltham Wildcats	Melbourne	(Victoria (state)) Victoria	Montmorency Secondary College	2019
	Frankston Blues	Melbourne	(Victoria (state)) Victoria	Jubilee Park Stadium	2019
	Geelong United	Geelong	(Victoria (state)) Victoria	Geelong Arena	2019
	Hobart Chargers	Hobart	Tasmania	The Hutchins School	2020
	Keilor Thunder	Melbourne	(Victoria (state)) Victoria	Keilor Basketball Stadium	2022
	Kilsyth Cobras	Melbourne	(Victoria (state)) Victoria	Kilsyth Sports Centre	2019
	Knox Raiders	Melbourne	(Victoria (state)) Victoria	State Basketball Centre	2019
	Melbourne Tigers	Melbourne	(Victoria (state)) Victoria	Melbourne Sports and Aquatic Centre	2019
	Mount Gambier Pioneers	Mount Gambier	South Australia	Wulanda Recreation and Convention Centre	2020
	Northern Force	Launceston/Ulverstone	Tasmania	Elphin Sports Centre; Ulverstone Sports & Leisure Centre	2026
	Nunawading Spectres	Melbourne	(Victoria (state)) Victoria	Nunawading Basketball Centre	2019
	Ringwood Hawks	Melbourne	(Victoria (state)) Victoria	The Rings	2019
	Sandringham Sabres	Melbourne	(Victoria (state)) Victoria	Southern Basketball Stadium	2019
	Waverley Falcons	Melbourne	(Victoria (state)) Victoria	Waverley Basketball Centre	2019

=== Former and defunct clubs ===
- Albury Wodonga Bandits (2019–2021) – moved to NBL1 East in 2022
- BA Centre of Excellence (2019) – NBL1 Wildcard conference (2022), NBL1 East (2023–present)
- Hobart Huskies (2019) – defunct
- Launceston Tornadoes (2019–2025) – merged into Northern Force
- North-West Tasmania Thunder (2019–2025) – merged into Northern Force

== Honours ==
=== League championships ===
Team	Total Titles	Men's		Women's		Notes
Team	Total Titles	Titles	Winning seasons	Titles	Winning seasons	Notes
Knox Raiders	3	1	2023	2	2025, 2026	
Kilsyth Cobras	1	0		1	2019	Won the women's inaugural title in 2019.
Nunawading Spectres	1	1	2019	0		Won the men's inaugural title in 2019.
Ringwood Hawks	1	0		1	2022	
Hobart Chargers	1	1	2022	0		
Bendigo Braves	1	0		1	2023	
Waverley Falcons	1	0		1	2024	
Eltham Wildcats	1	1	2024	0		
Sandringham Sabres	1	1	2025	0		
Frankston Blues	1	1	2026	0		

=== Awards ===
- Most Valuable Player
- Defensive Player of the Year
- Youth Player of the Year
- All-Star Five
- Coach of the Year
- Referee of the Year
- Club of the Year
