= Hobart Chargers =

- Leagues: NBL1 South
- Founded: 1981
- History: Men: Hobart Hornets; 1981–1982; 1990–1996; Hobart Chargers; 1997–2018; 2020– Women: Hobart Hurricanes; 1998–2002; Hobart Chargers; 2010–2018; 2020–
- Arena: The Hutchins School
- Location: Hobart, Tasmania
- Team colors: Sky blue, grey and white
- Chairman: Dean Young
- Head coach: M: Tre Armstrong; W: Jack Fleming
- Championships: Men: ABA (2): 2000; 2002; SEABL (2): 2008; 2018; NBL1 South (1): 2022
- Conference titles: Men: SEABL (5): 1997; 1998; 2000; 2002; 2008; Women: SEABL (1): 2014
- Website: NBL1.com.au

Hobart Chargers is a NBL1 South club based in Hobart, Tasmania. The club fields a team in both the Men's and Women's NBL1 South. The Chargers play their home games at The Hutchins School.

== Club history ==
=== Early years ===
In 1981, the Hobart Hornets entered the South East Australian Basketball League (SEABL) for the league's inaugural season. After two seasons in the SEABL, the team withdrew from the league due to the introduction of the Hobart Devils in the National Basketball League (NBL) in 1983. The Hornets re-entered the SEABL in 1990. Between 1990 and 1996, Hobart had seven straight seasons of missing the playoffs under coaches Denis Hyland (1990–91; 1993–95), Danny Adamson (1992), and Ross Park (1996).

=== Chargers in the SEABL ===
The Chargers name was born in 1997 after the demise of the Hobart Devils. The Chargers immediately saw success as they won back-to-back SEABL South Conference championships in 1997 and 1998. In 2000 and 2002, they not only won their third and fourth South Conference titles, but were successful in claiming the ABA National championship in both years.

The Chargers' inaugural coach, Mark Chivers, ended his 11-year tenure following the 2007 season. In 2008, Dan Krebs took over as coach of the Chargers and guided them to their fifth South Conference title. They went on to win the overall SEABL championship after defeating East Conference champions, the Knox Raiders, in a contest that earned the winning team a semi-finals place in the Australian Club Championships. In the ACC semi-finals, the Chargers defeated the Melbourne Tigers 128–126 to move on to the grand final. There they were defeated 103–99 by the Rockhampton Rockets to finish as national runners-up. Despite his successful season with the Chargers, Krebs was replaced as coach in 2009 with former NBL player Anthony Stewart.

Between 1998 and 2002, a women's team known as the Hobart Hurricanes played in the SEABL but missed the playoffs all five years. In 2010, a Hobart women's program returned to the SEABL, now known as the Lady Chargers. In 2014, the Lady Chargers made their first ever conference final. After winning the South Conference championship, they went on to lose in the 2014 SEABL grand final against the Brisbane Spartans.

In September 2016, former Tasmanian Labor premier, David Bartlett, was appointed president of the Chargers. The club had numerous issues off the court at the time of Bartlett's appointment, including being $120,000 in debt. Financial problems almost resulted in the men's team being booted from the 2016 SEABL playoffs, while questions remained about the financial security of the women's program.

Bartlett had plans for the Chargers to become the lead candidate for Tasmania's return to the NBL. He wanted the club to be "NBL ready" in three years and win at least one SEABL championship over those three years. These plans were gaining momentum in 2017 but in 2018, plans to get the Chargers into the NBL morphed into an overarching Tasmanian bid for a proposed new franchise to be called Southern Huskies. The bid ultimately fell through and the Huskies franchise went on to have a tumultuous one-year stint in the New Zealand NBL in 2019. In 2020, the Tasmania JackJumpers were accepted into the Australian NBL for the 2021–22 season.

Up until the 2016 season, for more than a decade, the Chargers had played at the Hobart Netball and Sports Centre, but were forced to train at New Town High and Warrane Stadium because the centre was not available during the week. Bartlett secured a deal for the 2017 SEABL season that saw the Chargers return to the Derwent Entertainment Centre. The Chargers also introduced a new logo and playing strip for the 2017 season.

In 2018, the Chargers men's team won the SEABL championship with a victory over the Nunawading Spectres in the grand final.

=== NBL1 ===
Following the disbandment of the SEABL, the Chargers opted out of the new NBL1 competition which debuted in 2019 due to a dispute with Basketball Tasmania. The Hobart Huskies subsequently competed in the 2019 NBL1 season, but following their demise after one season, the Chargers applied for entry into the NBL1 South in October 2019. The Chargers were granted entry into the 2020 NBL1 season but ultimately missed the entire year due to the COVID-19 pandemic. They debuted in the NBL1 South in the 2021 season playing at Kingborough Sports Centre.

In 2022, the men's team won their first NBL1 South championship after defeating the Mount Gambier Pioneers in the grand final.

In August 2025, the Chargers informed Basketball Tasmania of their intention to enter recess, citing unsustainable financial pressures and a shortfall of $300,000 needed annually to remain operational. They ultimately remained in the NBL South for the 2026 season and moved into a new home venue, The Hutchins School.

In April 2026, the Chargers played a regular season match against new state rivals the Northern Force at MyState Bank Arena to celebrate 30 years of Chargers basketball.

== Notable players ==
=== Australian players ===
Men:

- Jarred Bairstow (2022-2023)
- Anthony Drmic (2025-2026)
- Tad Dufelmeier (2021)
- Harry Froling (2022)
- Hugh Greenwood (2011)
- Sam McDaniel (2022-2023)
- Craig Moller (2018)
- Mathiang Muo (2017-2018)
- Mark Nash (1994, 1997, 2005, 2007-2012)
- Clint Steindl (2024)
- Anthony Stewart (2005-2011, 2013)
- Jarrad Weeks (2016)
- Kevin White (2015)

Women:

- Alex Ciabattoni (2017)
- Madeleine Garrick (2021)
- Mikaela Ruef (2017)
- Kayla Steindl (2023-2025)
- Klara Wischer (2014-2015)
- Izzy Wright (2013-2016)

=== Overseas players ===
Men:

- (United States) Brandon Polk (2010, 2012-2013)

Women:

- (United States) Amy Kame (2015)
- (United States) Brittany Smart (2018)
