= Elphin Sports Centre =

Sports venue in Launceston, Tasmania

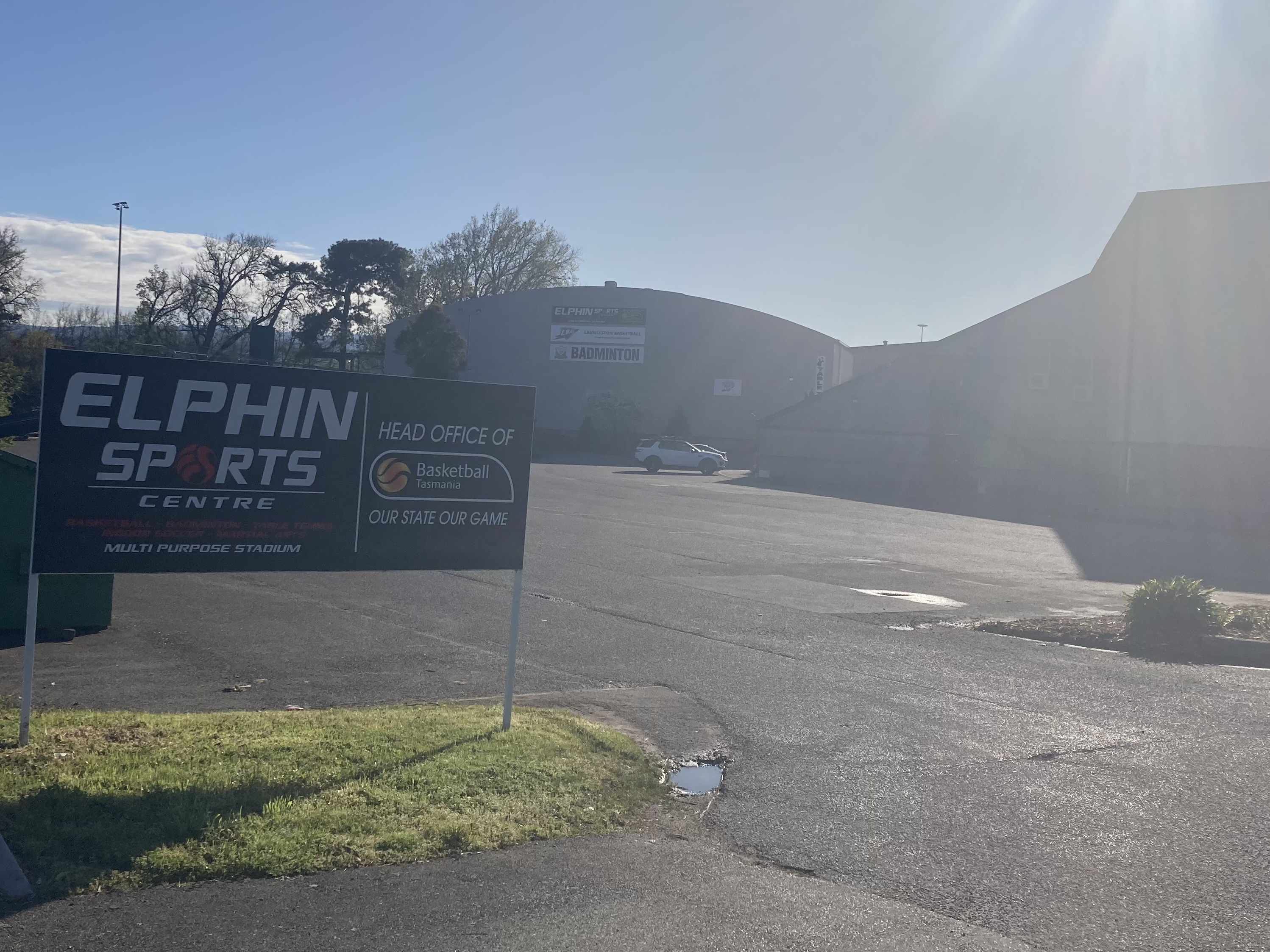
- Interactive map of Elphin Sports Centre
- Former names: Dowling Street Stadium
- Location: Launceston, Tasmania
- Coordinates: 41.431181°S 147.152592°E

Construction
- Groundbreaking: 1964
- Opened: 1965

Tenants
- Launceston Casino City (NBL) (1980–1982); Launceston Tornadoes (SEABL/NBL1 South) (1994–2025); Northern Force (NBL1 South) (2026-present)

The Elphin Sports Centre (formerly known as Dowling Street Stadium) is an indoor sporting venue located in Launceston, Tasmania. Construction commenced at the centre in 1964 and was opened in August the following year.

Launceston Casino City played in the National Basketball League (NBL) between 1980 and 1982. During this time, they played their home games at Dowling Street Stadium. Casino City's 1981 championship banner hung on the wall of the old Dowling St courts for many years until being packed up and forgotten about following renovations. In 2009, a public plea was made to help locate the championship banner. The banner was found in a Hobart shed in 2019 and was later unveiled at the Silverdome by the Tasmania JackJumpers in 2023. As of October 2024, the 1981 championship banner was being restored with the intent to display it at the Elphin Sports Centre.
