= Ballarat Minerdome =

Sports stadium in Ballarat, Victoria

Coordinates: 37°31′41″S 143°50′28″E

The Ballarat Minerdome (also known as MARS Minerdome under a naming rights agreement with Mars Chocolate Australia) is a sports stadium located in Ballarat, Victoria, Australia. It hosts the South East Australian Basketball League teams Ballarat Miners and Ballarat Rush, and can hold up to 2,000 spectators.

On 29 October 2006, the Minerdome hosted its only National Basketball League game when four-time Olympian and former US National Basketball Association player Shane Heal led the Melbourne-based South Dragons to a 96–86 win over the Cairns Taipans in front of a capacity crowd of 2,000 fans.
