= List of SEABL champions =

Below is a list of South East Australian Basketball League (SEABL) champions for both the men's and women's competitions. The men's competition ran from 1981 to 2018, while the women's competition ran from 1990 to 2018.

== Men ==
The champions of the SEABL from 1981 to 1994 were all identical to those who finished on top of the regular-season ladder. From 1995 to 2007, there were conference grand finals that determined the conference champions.

In 2008, a SEABL grand final was held between the South and East conference champions and an overall SEABL champion was crowned for the first time since 1985. The conference system was scrapped by the SEABL in 2018, with a top eight finals structure taking its place.

Year	South champion	East champion	League champion	Ref
1981	–	–	Geelong Cats	
1982	–	–	Frankston Bears	
1983	–	–	Melbourne Tigers	
1984	–	–	Chelsea Gulls	
1985	–	–	Dandenong Rangers	
1986	Newcastle Hunters	Dandenong Rangers	–	
1987	Ballarat Miners	Adelaide Buffalos	–	
1988	Bendigo Braves	Bulleen Boomers	–	
1989	Ballarat Miners	Bulleen Boomers	–	
1990	Ballarat Miners	Bendigo Braves	–	
1991	Knox Raiders	Ballarat Miners	–	
1992	North East Melbourne Arrows	Bayside Blues	–	
1993	Bayside Blues	Sydney City Comets	–	
1994	Broadmeadows Broncos	Knox Raiders	–	
1995	Frankston Blues	Nunawading Spectres	–	
1996	North-West Tasmania Originals	Knox Raiders	–	
1997	Hobart Chargers	Dandenong Rangers	–	
1998	Hobart Chargers	Frankston Blues	–	
1999	Geelong Supercats	Kilsyth Cobras	–	
2000	Hobart Chargers	Frankston Blues	–	
2001	Ballarat Miners	Albury Wodonga Bandits	–	
2002	Hobart Chargers	Australian Institute of Sport	–	
2003	Mount Gambier Pioneers	Canberra Gunners	–	
2004	North-West Tasmania Thunder	Dandenong Rangers	–	
2005	Bendigo Braves	Geelong Supercats	–	
2006	Knox Raiders	Geelong Supercats	–	
2007	Bendigo Braves	Geelong Supercats	–	
2008	Hobart Chargers	Knox Raiders	Hobart Chargers	
2009	Frankston Blues	Knox Raiders	Knox Raiders	
2010	Geelong Supercats	Bendigo Braves	Geelong Supercats	
2011	Nunawading Spectres	Bendigo Braves	Nunawading Spectres	
2012	Albury Wodonga Bandits	Dandenong Rangers	Albury Wodonga Bandits	
2013	Mount Gambier Pioneers	Dandenong Rangers	Dandenong Rangers	
2014	Mount Gambier Pioneers	Nunawading Spectres	Mount Gambier Pioneers	
2015	Mount Gambier Pioneers	Albury Wodonga Bandits	Mount Gambier Pioneers	
2016	Mount Gambier Pioneers	Bendigo Braves	Bendigo Braves	
2017	Dandenong Rangers	Mount Gambier Pioneers	Mount Gambier Pioneers	
2018	–	–	Hobart Chargers	

=== Results by teams ===
Teams	Conference Champions		Teams	League Champions	
Teams		Year(s) won	Teams		Year(s) won
Bendigo	7	1988, 1990, 2005, 2007, 2010, 2011, 2016	Mount Gambier	3	2014, 2015, 2017
Dandenong	6	1986, 1997, 2004, 2012, 2013, 2017	Geelong	2	1981, 2010
Knox	6	1991, 1994, 1996, 2006, 2008, 2009	Dandenong	2	1985, 2013
Frankston/Bayside	6	1992, 1993, 1995, 1998, 2000, 2009	Hobart	2	2008, 2018
Mount Gambier	6	2003, 2013, 2014, 2015, 2016, 2017	Frankston/Bayside	1	1982
Ballarat	5	1987, 1989, 1990, 1991, 2001	Melbourne	1	1983
Hobart	5	1997, 1998, 2000, 2002, 2008	Chelsea	1	1984
Geelong	5	1999, 2005, 2006, 2007, 2010	Knox	1	2009
Nunawading	3	1995, 2011, 2014	Nunawading	1	2011
Albury Wodonga	3	2001, 2012, 2015	Albury Wodonga	1	2012
Bulleen	2	1988, 1989	Bendigo	1	2016
NW Tasmania	2	1996, 2004			
Newcastle	1	1986			
Adelaide	1	1987			
NE Melbourne	1	1992			
Sydney	1	1993			
Broadmeadows	1	1994			
Kilsyth	1	1999			
Australian Institute of Sport	1	2002			
Canberra	1	2003			

== Women ==
The SEABL women's competition was first introduced in 1990. In 2012, the women's competition was divided into two conferences for the first time due to five new women's teams having joined the SEABL since 2006—Brisbane (2007), Sandringham (2009), Hobart (2010), Geelong (2011) and Canberra (2012). Canberra's addition in 2012 expanded the league to 14 teams. The conference system was scrapped by the SEABL in 2018, with a top eight finals structure taking its place.

Year	South champion	East champion	League champion	Ref
1990	–	–	Dandenong Rangers	
1991	–	–	Dandenong Rangers	
1992	–	–	Knox Raiders	
1993	–	–	Frankston Blues	
1994	–	–	Knox Raiders	
1995	–	–	Launceston Tornadoes	
1996	–	–	Knox Raiders	
1997	–	–	Frankston Blues	
1998	–	–	Kilsyth Cobras	
1999	–	–	Bendigo Braves	
2000	–	–	Bendigo Braves	
2001	–	–	Dandenong Rangers	
2002	–	–	Kilsyth Cobras	
2003	–	–	Bendigo Braves	
2004	–	–	Frankston Blues	
2005	–	–	Ballarat Miners	
2006	–	–	Bendigo Braves	
2007	–	–	Bendigo Braves	
2008	–	–	Kilsyth Cobras	
2009	–	–	Brisbane Spartans	
2010	–	–	Dandenong Rangers	
2011	–	–	Dandenong Rangers	
2012	Knox Raiders	Dandenong Rangers	Dandenong Rangers	
2013	Knox Raiders	Bendigo Braves	Knox Raiders	
2014	Hobart Chargers	Brisbane Spartans	Brisbane Spartans	
2015	Kilsyth Cobras	Dandenong Rangers	Dandenong Rangers	
2016	Kilsyth Cobras	Dandenong Rangers	Dandenong Rangers	
2017	Bendigo Braves	Geelong Supercats	Geelong Supercats	
2018	–	–	Bendigo Braves	

=== Results by teams ===
Teams	Conference Champions		Teams	League Champions	
Teams		Year(s) won	Teams		Year(s) won
Dandenong	3	2012, 2015, 2016	Dandenong	8	1990, 1991, 2001, 2010, 2011, 2012, 2015, 2016
Knox	2	2012, 2013	Bendigo	6	1999, 2000, 2003, 2006, 2007, 2018
Bendigo	2	2013, 2017	Knox	4	1992, 1994, 1996, 2013
Kilsyth	2	2015, 2016	Frankston	3	1993, 1997, 2004
Hobart	1	2014	Kilsyth	3	1998, 2002, 2008
Brisbane	1	2014	Brisbane	2	2009, 2014
Geelong	1	2017	Launceston	1	1995
			Ballarat	1	2005
			Geelong	1	2017

== See also ==
- List of ABA National Champions
