= Northern Force (NBL1 South) =

- Leagues: NBL1 South
- Founded: September 2025
- History: Northern Force; 2026–present
- Arena: Elphin Sports Centre; Ulverstone Sports & Leisure Centre
- Location: Launceston, Tasmania; Ulverstone, Tasmania
- Team colors: Purple, white and black
- President: Craig Gibson
- Head coach: M: Jayden Smith; W: Zoë Mesman
- Website: NBL1.com.au

Northern Force is a NBL1 South club based in Launceston and Ulverstone in Tasmania, Australia. The club fields a team in both the Men's and Women's NBL1 South. In 2026, the Force played their home games at Elphin Sports Centre and Ulverstone Sports & Leisure Centre.

== History ==
In 2020, the Launceston Tornadoes and North-West Tasmania Thunder were granted jointly-held licences to compete in the NBL1 South competition. The agreement at the time was that this shared licence would conclude at the end of the 2025 NBL1 season and that a male and female team must be fielded under a single entity from 2026 onwards.

In September 2025, it was announced that a newly established Northern Tasmania Basketball Club (NTBC) would enter the NBL1 South for the 2026 NBL1 season with a men's and women's program, replacing the Tornadoes women and Thunder men. Basketball Tasmania awarded the licence to the Tornadoes-backed NTBC entity, leaving the Thunder's bid unsuccessful. The NTBC's official representative team name was revealed as the Northern Force in February 2026, with purple, white and black colours.

The Force hosted 11 home games in 2026, spread evenly between Launceston and the North West.
