= Bendigo Stadium =

Sports arena in Victoria, Australia

Bendigo Stadium Red Energy Stadium
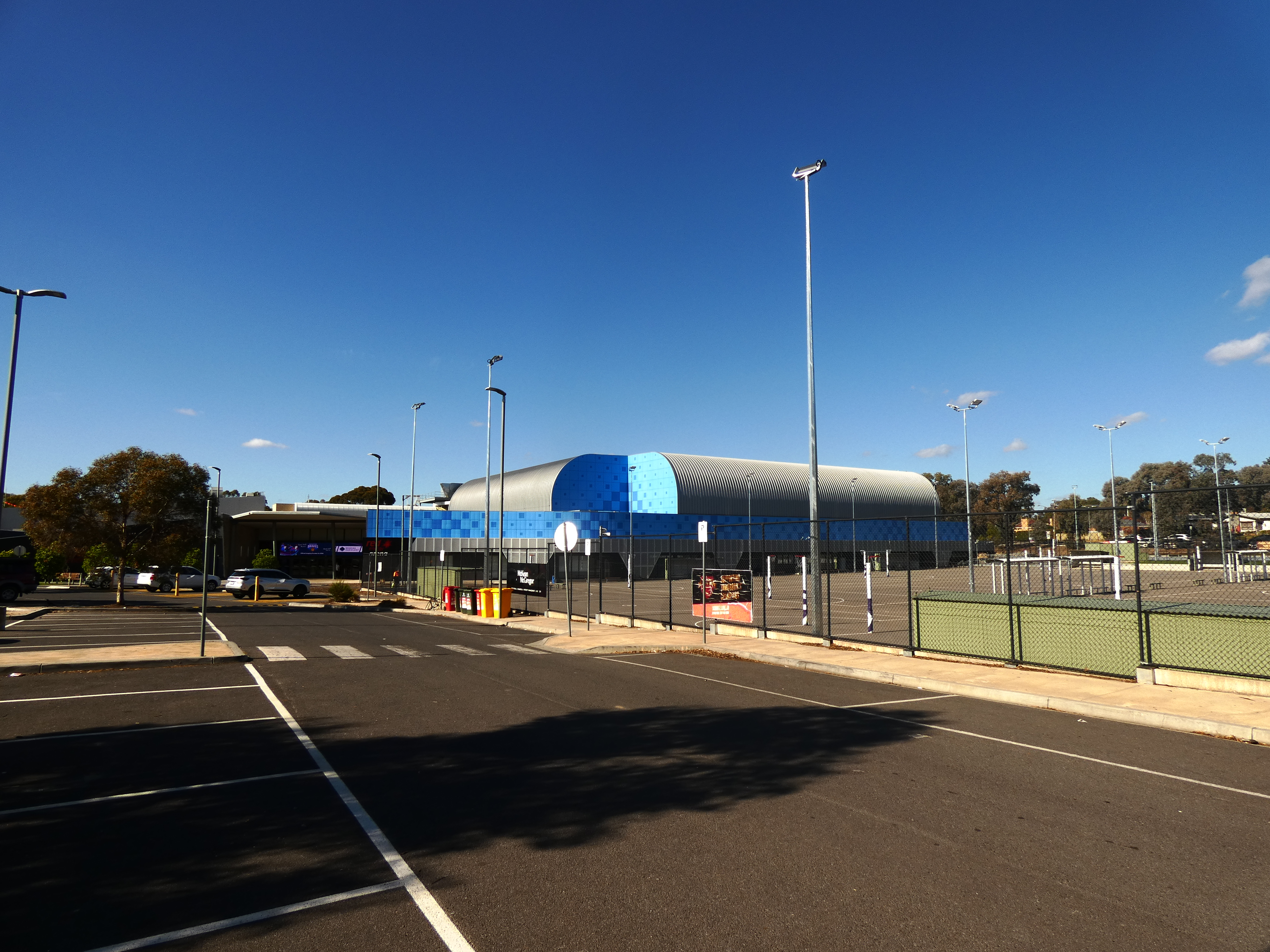
- Bendigo Stadium, May 2026
- Interactive map of Bendigo Stadium; Red Energy Stadium
- Location: 91 Inglis St, West Bendigo, Victoria
- Coordinates: 36°45′30″S 144°14′57″E
- Capacity: 4,000

Tenants
- Bendigo Braves (NBL1); Bendigo Spirit (WNBL); Australian Goldfields Open; Collingwood Magpies (NNL) (2019); Melbourne United (NBL) (2021, 2026-27); New Zealand Breakers (NBL) (2021-2022); Bendigo Volleyball Association (1994 to present); 2006 Commonwealth Games (Basketball)

Bendigo Stadium (known as Red Energy Arena under naming rights) is an Australian sports and entertainment centre in Bendigo, Victoria. The stadium is home to the Bendigo Braves (NBL1) and Bendigo Spirit (WNBL). It held basketball matches during the 2006 Commonwealth Games and would have held netball during the 2026 Commonwealth Games, but Victoria withdrew their hosting rights in 2023.

The stadium's facilities include ten indoor sports courts, major exhibition and function areas, a licensed clubroom and associated administration facilities. The stadium has the flexibility to be used for major sporting, cultural and entertainment events and has held such events as The Young Divas, Vanessa Amorosi, international basketball, netball, snooker and volleyball.

The largest recorded attendance at the venue was on 3 March 2013 when Bendigo Spirit defeated the Townsville Fire 71–57 in the 2012-13 WNBL Grand Final. In May 2018, the venue was re-opened after a $23 million redevelopment was completed which upgraded the facilities and increased the venue's capacity.

== Events ==
The stadium hosted its first Suncorp Super Netball match on 25 May 2019, when Collingwood Magpies played West Coast Fever in a 2019 Suncorp Super Netball Round 5 match. It was part of a double header that also featured Tasmanian Magpies play Western Sting in an Australian Netball League fixture.

The facility co-hosted the 2003 FIBA Oceania Championship where the Australian national basketball team won the gold medal.

Bendigo also hosted Group 3 of The International Volleyball Women's Grand Prix in June 2016 over 3 days of which Australia competed against Cuba Columbia and Croatia

The Arena has also hosted Australian National Basketball League Games for Melbourne United during the 2020–21 NBL season, including Throwdown V against the South East Melbourne Phoenix. It also hosted a Round 11 Match where the New Zealand Breakers played Melbourne United in a Breakers Home Game. On 21 March 2022, it was announced that Bendigo Stadium would also host 2 further New Zealand Breakers Home Games during the 2021-22 NBL season, due to COVID-19 Protocols restricting the Breakers from returning to New Zealand. They played the South East Melbourne Phoenix on 10 April 2022 and the Sydney Kings on 12 April 2022, with the Breakers losing both Games.

On 12 September 2025, it was announced that Melbourne United would return to Bendigo Stadium to play their NBL Ignite Cup Games during the 2025-26 & 2026-27 NBL Seasons, as part of a deal between the club and the Victoria State Government.

== See also ==
- List of indoor arenas in Australia
