= Nunawading Spectres =

Melbourne-based basketball club

- Leagues: NBL1 South
- Founded: 1979
- History: NBL/WNBL: Men: Nunawading Spectres; 1979–1986; Eastside Spectres; 1987–1991; Women: Nunawading Spectres; 1982–1991; SEABL/NBL1; Men: Nunawading Spectres; 1990–present Women: Nunawading Spectres; 1992–present
- Arena: Nunawading Basketball Centre
- Location: Burwood East, Victoria
- Team colors: Royal blue, red, white
- Main sponsor: Quest Burwood East
- CEO: Mark Hallett
- Head coach: M: Andrew Cutler; W: Paul Flynn
- Championships: Men: SEABL (1): 2011; NBL1 (1): 2019; Women: WNBL (6): 1983; 1984; 1986; 1987; 1988; 1989
- Conference titles: Men: SEABL (3): 1995; 2011; 2014
- Website: NBL1.com.au

Nunawading Spectres is a NBL1 South club based in Melbourne, Victoria. The club fields a team in both the Men's and Women's NBL1 South. The club is a division of Melbourne East Basketball Association (MEBA), the major administrative basketball organisation in the City of Whitehorse. The Spectres play their home games at Nunawading Basketball Centre.

== Club history ==
=== NBL/WNBL ===
Eastside Spectres logo (1987–1991)

In 1979, a Nunawading Spectres men's team entered the National Basketball League (NBL), joining nine other teams for the league's inaugural season. In 1987, the team changed their name to Eastside Spectres and spent five years under that moniker before merging with the Southern Melbourne Saints in 1992 to become the South East Melbourne Magic. During their time in the NBL, the Spectres were two-time grand finalists, losing to Launceston in 1981 and Perth in 1991.

Between 1982 and 1991, a Nunawading Spectres women's team played in the Women's National Basketball League (WNBL). The team won six championships in ten seasons under coach Tom Maher and guard Robyn Maher, including four in a row between 1986 and 1989. Following the 1991 season, the team's WNBL license was obtained by the Dandenong Rangers.

=== SEABL/NBL1 ===
In 1990, with the Eastside Spectres still a championship contender in the NBL, a Nunawading Spectres men's team re-emerged in the form of a South East Australian Basketball League (SEABL) franchise. In 1992, a Spectres women's team debuted in the SEABL.

In 1995, the men's team collected their first title as they won the SEABL East Conference championship. The women's team were SEABL runners-up in both 2000 and 2008, while the men were conference runners-up in 1999 and 2004.

In 2011, the men's team won their second conference title and their first SEABL championship after defeating the Bendigo Braves 88–61 in the grand final. Spectres guard Shane McDonald had a game-high 28 points to earn the MVP award.

After finishing as conference runners-up in 2013, the men's team won their third conference title in 2014 behind the likes of Mitch Creek, Tommy Greer, Shane McDonald, Simon Conn and Matt O'Hea. They went on to lose 85–71 in the SEABL grand final to the Mount Gambier Pioneers.

In 2018, the Spectres men finished as SEABL runners-up after losing in the grand final to the Hobart Chargers.

In 2019, following the demise of the SEABL, the Spectres joined the NBL1. The men went on to win the championship with a 99–90 win over the Bendigo Braves in the grand final. The NBL1 South season did not go ahead in 2020 due to the COVID-19 pandemic.

== NBL Season by season ==
NBL champions	League champions	Runners-up	Finals berth

Season	Tier	League	Regular season					Post-season	Head coach
Season	Tier	League	Finish	Played	Wins	Losses	Win %	Post-season	Head coach
Nunawading Spectres
1979	1	NBL	3rd	18	13	5	.722	Did not qualify	Barry Barnes
1980	1	NBL	4th	22	14	8	.636	Lost semifinal (St. Kilda) 77–101	Barry Barnes
1981	1	NBL	4th	22	13	9	.591	Won semifinal (West Adelaide) 74–71; Lost NBL final (Launceston) 54–75	Barry Barnes
1982	1	NBL	3rd	26	19	7	.731	Lost semifinal (Geelong) 59–71	Barry Barnes
1983	1	NBL	3rd	22	15	7	.682	Qualified round robin 2–1; Lost semifinal (West Adelaide) 77–84)	Barry Barnes
1984	1	NBL	4th	23	14	9	.609	Won elimination final (Adelaide) 108–101; Lost qualifying final (Geelong) 91–115	Barry Barnes
1985	1	NBL	3rd	26	19	7	.731	Lost elimination final (Newcastle) 97–103	Barry Barnes
1986	1	NBL	9th	26	12	14	.462	Did not qualify	Barry Barnes
Eastside Spectres
1987	1	NBL	8th	26	13	13	.500	Did not qualify	Barry Barnes
1988	1	NBL	8th	24	11	13	.458	Did not qualify	Brian Goorjian
1989	1	NBL	7th	24	14	10	.583	Did not qualify	Brian Goorjian
1990	1	NBL	2nd	26	18	8	.692	Lost semifinals (Brisbane) 0–2	Brian Goorjian
1991	1	NBL	2nd	26	17	9	.654	Won semifinals (North Melbourne) 2–0; Lost NBL finals (Perth) 1–2	Brian Goorjian
Regular season record				311	192	119	.617	0 regular season champions	
Finals record				18	7	11	.389	0 NBL championships	

As of the end of the 1991 season

*Note: In 1983 and 1984, the NBL was split into Eastern and Western divisions during the regular season.

Source: Eastside Spectres Year by Year

== Honour roll ==
NBL Championships:	None
NBL Finals Appearances:	8 (1980, 1981, 1982, 1983, 1984, 1985, 1990, 1991)
NBL Grand Final Appearances:	1 (1991)
NBL Most Valuable Players:	None
NBL Grand Final MVPs:	None
All-NBL First Team:	Kent Lockhart (1989)
All-NBL Second Team:	Vince Hinchin (1987), Dean Uthoff (1988, 1989), Bruce Bolden (1990), Kent Lockhart (1990)
NBL Coach of the Year:	Barry Barnes (1980)
NBL Rookie of the Year:	Steve Lunardon (1986)
NBL Most Improved Player:	Darren Lucas (1988)
NBL Best Defensive Player:	None
NBL Best Sixth Man:	None
