= Geelong United (NBL1 South) =

Defunct basketball team from Geelong, Australia

- Leagues: NBL1 South
- Founded: 1981
- History: Men: Geelong Cats; 1981–1987; Geelong Supercats; 1988–2021; Geelong United Supercats; 2022–2023; Geelong United; 2024–present Women: Geelong Lady Cats; 1986–2010; Geelong Supercats; 2011–2021; Geelong United Supercats; 2022–2023; Geelong United; 2024–present
- Arena: Geelong Arena
- Capacity: 2,000
- Location: Geelong, Victoria
- Team colors: Navy blue, white
- Main sponsor: Stockland
- CEO: Mark Neeld
- Head coach: Men: Demarcus Gatlin & Brent Reid; Women: Megan Moody
- Championships: Men: ABA (3): 1981; 1999; 2006; SEABL (2): 1981; 2010; Women: Big V (1): 2010; SEABL (1): 2017
- Conference titles: Men: SEABL (5): 1999; 2005; 2006; 2007; 2010; Women: SEABL (1): 2017
- Website: NBL1.com.au

Geelong United is a NBL1 South club based in Geelong, Victoria. Previously known as the Geelong Supercats, the club fields teams in both the Men's and Women's NBL1 South. The club is affiliated with Geelong United Basketball and plays its home games at the Geelong Arena.

== Club history ==
=== Early years ===
The Geelong Basketball Club was established in 1977 with a men's team. The team entered the Victorian Championship and finished sixth in 1978 and fifth in 1979. In 1980, the team signed Cal Bruton, Steven Kelocinski and Ray Shirley. That year, the side won three major tournaments and finished runners-up in the VBA championships.

In 1981, the Geelong Cats debuted in the South East Australian Basketball League (SEABL) and won the inaugural SEABL championship and inaugural ABA National championship. Geelong was subsequently invited to compete in the Converse Super Challenge in Adelaide against Launceston (1981 national league winners), West Adelaide (No. 1 team in South Australia), and St Kilda (Australia's representative in the world championships in Brazil). Geelong emerged victors of the Super Challenge. The club was also the Victorian Summer Championship Premiers with a resounding victory over the national league team Nunawading. With the victory, Geelong was accepted into the National Basketball League (NBL) for the 1982 season.

=== NBL franchise ===
The Cats finished runners-up in the 1982 NBL season. They had 13 straight wins during the season and finished second on the ladder after the home-and-away rounds. They eventually lost in the NBL Grand Final to the West Adelaide Bearcats 80–74 after having trailed by 22 points. Cal Bruton was named NBL Coach of the Year. In 1983 and 1984, the Cats finished on top of the NBL's Western Division both years.

The team suffered at the hands of ownership problems during the latter part of the 1980s to the extent that a mass exodus of players at the end of 1987 contributed to a winless season in 1988, the same year the team changed its name from the Cats to the Supercats. At the end of the 1988 season, a group of local businessmen fought to save the team and as a result were granted a license to ensure Geelong's ongoing participation in the NBL.

After a top-three finish in 1991, another exodus of players resulted in the Supercats finishing last in 1992.

Following the 1996 NBL season, the license was sold back to the league. The team's final NBL match was a 100–94 loss against the Sydney Kings at the Sydney Entertainment Centre in the final round of the 1996 season.

The Supercats finished with 388 NBL games over 15 years.

=== Return to SEABL and introduction of women's team ===
In 1997, the Supercats re-entered the South East Australian Basketball League (SEABL). They missed the finals with a 12–12 record. In 1998, the Supercats had a 23–8 record and finished runners-up to Hobart for the South Conference title. The second-place finish entitled the Supercats to participate in the National finals, where they lost to eventual champions Cairns in the semi-finals.

In 1999, the Supercats finished first in the South Conference with a 22–8 record and defeated Nunawading in the South Conference final. In the National finals, wins against Cairns (94–93) and the AIS (101–92) were followed by a 98–78 win over Kilsyth in the grand final. They subsequently won their second ABA National championship.

In 2000 and 2001, both seasons ended with conference semi-finals losses to Frankston. In 2002, the Supercats reached the conference grand final, where they lost 111–100 to the AIS. In 2003, they finished fourth in the East conference with a 14–12 record before losing in the semi-final to Hume City. In 2004, they finished in fourth in the East conference with a 14–14 record. They went on to lose in the elimination semi-final before earning a wild card entry into the National finals due to Geelong being the host venue. There the Supercats were eliminated by the Sydney Comets in the first round.

In 2005, Geelong finished the regular season as minor premiers with a 15–11 record and went on to defeat Mildura to secure the SEABL East Conference championship. Geelong again played host to the ABA National finals, with the Supercats again losing to the Sydney Comets in the first round.

In 2006, imports Jamal Brown and Shawn Myers guided the Supercats to a second-place finish with a 17–9 record before leading them to a 108–73 win over Canberra in the conference grand final to record their second consecutive SEABL East Conference championship. Travelling to Newcastle the following week for the ABA National finals, the Supercats defeated Southern Districts and Knox to reach the grand final. There Geelong defeated Dandenong 94–80 to claim their third national championship.

The core group of local Geelong talent and both imports Myers and Brown were retained for the 2007 season. The team was undefeated through the first 17 games and went on to record their best-ever season of 22 wins and 4 losses to secure the minor premiership. Geelong met Canberra in the 2007 Conference Grand Final, which saw the rematch go to Geelong; they won an unprecedented third straight SEABL conference title. Geelong hosted the North Adelaide Rockets in the ABA National quarter-finals and defeated them by 29 points but then were defeated by eventual National Champions, the Cairns Marlins, the following weekend in the ABA National semi-finals.

2008 was a rebuilding year for the Supercats, who saw their season end with a conference semi-final loss to Frankston. The Supercats returned to the conference grand final in 2009, where they again lost to Frankston.

The 2010 season saw Jamie O'Loughlin take over as head coach. With import Isma'il Muhammad staying on for another season, the Supercats recruited J'Nathan Bullock to the second import spot. The combination proved ultimately successful, with Geelong winning the South Conference title against Hobart and then defeated Bendigo in the SEABL Championship final.

The women's program of Basketball Geelong, the Geelong Lady Cats, played in the Women's National Basketball League (WNBL) in 1986 and in the Victorian Basketball League (VBL) during the 1990s. The team was an inaugural member of the Big V in 2000. After winning the 2010 Big V championship, the team entered the SEABL for the first time in 2011.

In 2017, the Supercats women won their first SEABL championship with a 76–67 grand final victory over the Bendigo Braves.

=== NBL1 and new Geelong United ownership ===
In 2019, following the demise of the SEABL, the Supercats joined the NBL1 for the new competition's inaugural season. The women's team reached the 2019 NBL1 grand final, where they lost 86–76 to the Kilsyth Cobras. That same year, Basketball Geelong and Corio Bay Basketball Association amalgamated under a new banner, Geelong United Basketball (GUB).

The Supercats did not play in 2020 due to the COVID-19 pandemic.

The teams officially became known as Geelong United Supercats for the 2022 NBL1 season. In April 2024, GUB completed its branding change for the NBL1 teams from 'Supercats' to 'United'.

In 2025, the Geelong United women's team went undefeated in the NBL1 South regular season with a 22–0 record. They went on to reach the NBL1 South Grand Final, where they lost 84–64 to the Knox Raiders.

== NBL Season by season ==
NBL champions	League champions	Runners-up	Finals berth

Season	Tier	League	Regular season					Post-season	Head coach
Season	Tier	League	Finish	Played	Wins	Losses	Win rate	Post-season	Head coach
Geelong Cats
1982	1	NBL	2nd	26	20	6	.769	Won semifinal (Nunawading) 71–59; Lost NBL final (West Adelaide) 74–80	Tim Kaiser; Cal Bruton
1983	1	NBL	1st	22	18	4	.818	Eliminated round robin 1–2	Cal Bruton
1984	1	NBL	1st	23	21	2	.913	Lost preliminary final (Canberra) 81–87; Won qualifying final (Nunawading) 115–91; Lost semifinal (Brisbane) 103–107	Cal Bruton
1985	1	NBL	7th	26	15	11	.577	Did not qualify	Casey Jones; Ken Richardson
1986	1	NBL	7th	26	14	12	.538	Did not qualify	Ken Richardson
1987	1	NBL	9th	26	13	13	.500	Did not qualify	Ken Richardson
Geelong Supercats
1988	1	NBL	13th	24	0	24	.000	Did not qualify	Pete Mathieson
1989	1	NBL	13th	24	5	19	.208	Did not qualify	Barry Barnes; Terry Kealey
1990	1	NBL	10th	26	11	15	.423	Did not qualify	Barry Barnes; Terry Kealey
1991	1	NBL	3rd	26	17	9	.654	Lost elimination finals (North Melbourne) 1–2	Barry Barnes; Terry Kealey
1992	1	NBL	13th	24	2	22	.083	Did not qualify	Steve Breheny
1993	1	NBL	12th	26	7	19	.269	Did not qualify	Steve Breheny; Terry Kealey; Jim Calvin
1994	1	NBL	12th	26	7	19	.269	Did not qualify	Jim Calvin
1995	1	NBL	12th	26	9	17	.346	Did not qualify	Jim Calvin
1996	1	NBL	13th	26	6	20	.231	Did not qualify	Ian Stacker
Regular season record				377	165	212	.438	2 regular season champions	
Finals record				11	4	7	.267	0 NBL championships	

As of the end of the 1996 season

*Note: In 1983 and 1984, the NBL was split into Eastern and Western divisions during the regular season.

== Future ==
In March 2025, NBL owner Larry Kestelman revealed that the Geelong Supercats brand could be revived by the league if the city was to be awarded a new licence in the future.
