= North-West Tasmania Thunder =

- Leagues: NBL1 South
- Founded: 1986
- Folded: 2025
- History: Devonport Warriors; 1986–1993; NW Tasmania Originals/Brewers; 1994–2002; NW Tasmania Thunder; 2003–2025
- Arena: Ulverstone Sports & Leisure Centre
- Capacity: 1,000
- Location: Ulverstone, Tasmania
- Team colors: Black & orange
- Championships: ABA (1): 1996
- Conference titles: SEABL (2): 1996; 2004

The North-West Tasmania Thunder are a defunct Australian basketball team that played in the South East Australian Basketball League (SEABL) and NBL1 South. The team was based in Ulverstone, Tasmania, and played their home games at the Ulverstone Sports and Leisure Centre.

== Team history ==
The franchise began in 1986 from the remnants of the Devonport Warriors National Basketball League team. Devonport debuted in the South East Australian Basketball League (SEABL) in 1986 and missed the playoffs every year under that moniker up until the 1993 season. The North-West Tasmania name debuted in 1994 and the team made the SEABL playoffs for the first time that year under coach Phil Thomas.

In 1996, the North West Boag's Originals won the SEABL South Conference championship after defeating the Ballarat Miners in an overtime victory in the South Conference final. The Originals then went on to win the Australian Basketball Association (ABA) quarter-final against Dandenong, the semi-final against Brisbane and then the championship final against Knox. All four finals were held at the Originals' home court at the Devonport Sports Stadium. The team lost three games early in the season and then went on an unprecedented winning streak, to end the season with a 19–3 record. The make-up of the Originals' 1996 squad included imports Dave Biwer and Jason Pepper as well as naturalised former American Keith Bragg and Australians Marcus Bellchambers, Ben Harvey and Ben Armstrong.

In 2003, the team was renamed the Thunder after being known as the Brewers in 2002. The following year, the Thunder collected the franchise's second SEABL South Conference championship before winning through to the ABA National Final, where they were defeated 104–100 by the Cairns Marlins.

In 2019, following the demise of the SEABL, the Thunder joined the NBL1 South.

In September 2025, the Thunder had its NBL1 South licence submission rejected by Basketball Tasmania, with a newly established Northern Tasmania Basketball Club led by the Launceston Tornadoes replacing the Thunder men and Tornadoes women for the 2026 NBL1 season.
