= Dandenong Rangers (NBL1 South) =

- Leagues: NBL1 South
- Founded: 1981
- History: Men: Dandenong Rangers; 1981–present Women: Dandenong Rangers; 1984–1991; 1994–present
- Arena: Dandenong Stadium
- Location: Dandenong North, Victoria
- Team colors: Green, white, brown
- President: Paul Jones
- Vice-president: Luke McLelland
- General manager: Tamie Harvey
- Head coach: M: Samantha Woosnam; W: Jaysn Harvey
- Championships: Men: SEABL (2): 1985; 2013; Big V (2): 2006; 2007; Women: WBC (1): 1989; ABA (2): 1990; 1991; SEABL (8): 1990; 1991; 2001; 2010; 2011; 2012; 2015; 2016
- Conference titles: Men: SEABL (6): 1986; 1997; 2004; 2012; 2013; 2017; Women: SEABL (3): 2012; 2015; 2016
- Website: NBL1.com.au

Dandenong Rangers is an NBL1 South club based in Melbourne, Victoria. The club fields a team in both the Men's and Women's NBL1 South. The club is a division of Dandenong Basketball Association (DBA), the major administrative basketball organisation in the City of Greater Dandenong. The Rangers play their home games at Dandenong Stadium.

== Club history ==
=== First SEABL stint ===
Dandenong Basketball Association was established in 1959.

In 1981, the Rangers were inaugural members of the South East Australian Basketball League (SEABL). In 1985, they won their first SEABL championship. In 1986, they won the SEABL East Conference championship.

In 1984, a Rangers women's team was an inaugural member of the Women's Basketball Conference (WBC). The Rangers won in 1989 and played in the inaugural SEABL women's competition in 1990 after the WBC was adopted by the SEABL. They went undefeated in 1990 and 1991 and won back-to-back SEABL championships alongside back-to-back ABA National championships. The team withdrew from the SEABL following the 1991 season, which coincided with the Dandenong Rangers WNBL team making their debut in the Women's National Basketball League (WNBL) in the 1992 season. A Rangers SEABL women's team was re-established in 1994.

The Rangers won the men's East Conference championship in 1997, the women's league championship in 2001, and the men's East Conference championship in 2004.

=== Big V ===
Following the 2004 season, the Rangers withdrew from the SEABL and entered the Big V in 2005. The men's team finished runners-up in their first season in the Big V.

In 2006, the men's team won the Big V championship with a 2–0 grand final series victory over the Sandringham Sabres. The women's team finished runners-up in 2006 after losing 2–0 to Sandringham in the grand final. Both teams played in the 2006 ABA National Finals, with the men reaching the grand final, where they lost 94–80 to the Geelong Supercats.

In 2007, the men's team won their second straight Big V championship after again winning 2–0 over the Sandringham Sabres in the grand final series. At the 2007 national finals, the Rangers again finished runners-up after losing 110–98 to the Cairns Marlins in the grand final.

In 2008, the men's team lost in the Big V preliminary final.

=== Second SEABL stint ===
The Rangers returned to the SEABL in 2009.

Between 2010 and 2012, the women's team won three straight SEABL championships, becoming the first SEABL women's team to win the championship three times in a row. The men meanwhile won back-to-back East Conference championships in 2012 and 2013. They lost in the 2012 SEABL grand final to the Albury Wodonga Bandits and won the 2013 SEABL championship with a grand final victory over the Mount Gambier Pioneers.

The women's team won back-to-back SEABL championships in 2015 and 2016. In 2017, the men's team won the South Conference championship and lost in the SEABL grand final to Mount Gambier.

=== NBL1 ===
After the demise of the SEABL following the 2018 season, a new competition known as NBL1 debuted in 2019 with the Rangers playing in the inaugural season. The NBL1 South season did not go ahead in 2020 due to the COVID-19 pandemic.
