= Bendigo Braves =

- Leagues: NBL1 South
- Founded: 1985
- History: Men: Bendigo Braves; 1985–present Women: Bendigo Braves; 1990–present
- Arena: Bendigo Stadium
- Location: Bendigo, Victoria
- Team colors: Blue & yellow
- Main sponsor: Men: McDonald's; Women: Champions IGA
- President: Ben McCauley
- Head coach: Men: Josh Cheney; Women: Tess Madgen
- Championships: Men: ABA (2): 1988; 2005; SEABL (1): 2016; Women: CVIBL (2): 1991; 1992; ABA (2): 2000; 2003; SEABL (6): 1999; 2000; 2003; 2006; 2007; 2018; NBL1 (1): 2023; NBL1 South (1): 2023
- Conference titles: Men: SEABL (7): 1988; 1990; 2005; 2007; 2010; 2011; 2016; Women: SEABL (2): 2013; 2017
- Website: NBL1.com.au

Bendigo Braves is a NBL1 South club based in Bendigo, Victoria, Australia. The club fields a team in both the Men's and Women's NBL1 South. The club is a division of Bendigo Basketball Association, the major administrative basketball organisation in the region. The Braves play their home games at Bendigo Stadium.

== Club history ==
=== Background ===
Bendigo Basketball Association commenced in 1947. In the early 1980s, an official representative club known as "The Braves" was formed. In 1984, behind player-coach Mel Dalgleish, the Braves men's team competed in the first division of the Victoria Basketball Association (VBA).

In 1985, the Braves became the first regional club to enter the South East Australian Basketball League (SEABL).

=== Men's team ===
After missing the playoffs in their inaugural SEABL season under Mel Dalgleish, the Braves appointed Tom Flavin as coach for 1986. Another year of missing the playoffs saw Flavin being replaced by David Flint in 1987. In Flint's second season as coach, the Braves not only won the SEABL South Conference title but also took out the 1988 ABA National Championship. During this time, guard David Johnson averaged 47.8 points per game over 94 contests, including an individual scoring performance of 70 points against the Bulleen Boomers in the 1988 championship game. Two years later, Johnson and Flint led the Braves to another conference title, this time taking out the East Conference championship.

After 1990, the Braves were unable to attain championship success again until 2005, when the likes of Shawn Redhage and Jason Cameron led the Braves to the SEABL South Conference title and the ABA National Championship. Redhage was named MVP of the conference grand final for his 43 points and 13 rebounds, while Cameron was named MVP of the ABA National Finals Grand Final. Two years later, the Braves repeated as South Conference champions after defeating the Kilsyth Cobras 74–63 in the SEABL South Grand Final. Jason Cameron was subsequently named Grand Final MVP.

In 2010 and 2011, the Braves were crowned back-to-back East Conference champions. In 2016, behind the play of import Jeremy Kendle, the Braves won their seventh conference title by taking out the East Conference championship. They went on to win the SEABL Championship after defeating the Mount Gambier Pioneers 79–61 in the final, with Kendle earning the Hugh McMenamin Medal as game MVP after scoring a game-high 34 points.

In 2019, the Braves reached the NBL1 grand final behind the likes of Ray Turner and Mathiang Muo, where they lost 99–90 to the Nunawading Spectres.

=== Women's team ===
The Lady Braves played in the inaugural SEABL women's season in 1990 and then withdrew. They subsequently joined the Country Victorian Invitational Basketball League (CVIBL), where they won back-to-back championships in 1991 and 1992 and finished runners-up in 1993. They returned to the SEABL in 1994 and reached the playoffs for the first time in 1996 when Bernie Harrower took over as head coach. Just two years later, Bendigo began a dynasty that would span ten years and include five SEABL championships and two ABA National championships.

In 1998, Bendigo went 14–6 through the regular season, eventually losing to Kilsyth in the Grand Final. The team was led by Kerryn Henderson and Emily McInerny. In 1999, the Lady Braves went 18–2 and defeated Kilsyth in the Grand Final. The team was led by Deanna Smith. Coach Harrower was awarded Coach of the Year. In 2000, the team won the ABA National Championship, defeating Nunawading in the Final after a 17–3 regular season record. The team was led by Kristi Harrower. Bernie Harrower won his second consecutive Coach of the Year award. The Lady Braves were unable to complete the three-peat the following year, despite an 18–4 regular season record, falling short in the 2001 Grand Final. After another second-place finish in 2002, Bendigo went 19–5 in 2003 and defeated Kilsyth in the Grand Final to go with another ABA National Championship. Bernie Harrower won third Coach of the Year honour.

After missing the playoffs in 2004 and 2005, Bendigo responded with a victory over Ballarat in the 2006 SEABL Grand Final; they went on to lose to Ballarat a week later in the ABA National Grand Final. Coach Harrower received Coach of the Year honours for the fourth time. The final year of their dynasty saw the Lady Braves snare a fifth SEABL Championship in 2007, again beating Ballarat in the final. Over the ten-year period, the Bendigo Lady Braves had a regular season record of 158–61, a playoffs record of 13–3 and an ABA record of 10–4 to finish with a win–loss ratio of 73%.

In 2018, the Lady Braves won their sixth SEABL championship with a 119–96 win over the Launceston Tornadoes in the grand final.

In 2022, the team reached the NBL1 South Grand Final, where they lost to the Ringwood Hawks.

In 2023, the team returned to the NBL1 South grand final where they won the championship with an 83–78 win over the Waverley Falcons behind Amy Atwell, Megan McKay and Kelly Wilson. They went on to win the NBL1 National championship at the NBL1 National Finals, where they defeated the Norths Bears 114–87 in the grand final. The Braves women went on to set a 33-game winning streak before a loss in late April 2024. The Braves missed the 2024 NBL1 South playoffs but returned to the 2024 NBL1 National Finals as defending champions, where they reached the championship game but lost to the Waverley Falcons.
