= Frankston Blues =

Basketball team from Melbourne, Australia

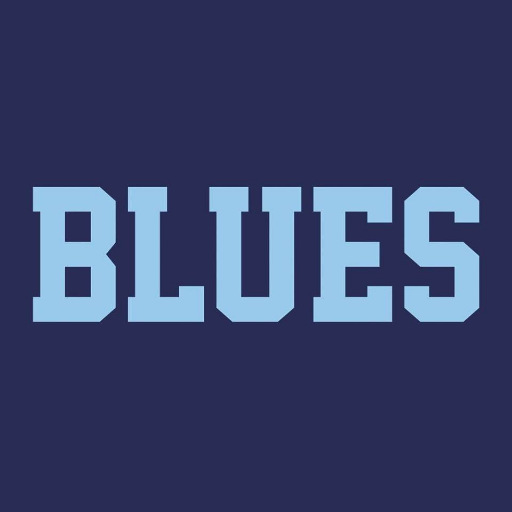
- Leagues: NBL1 South
- Founded: 1981
- History: Men: Frankston Bears; 1981–1984; Bayside Blues; 1986–1993; Frankston Blues; 1994–present Women: Frankston Bears; 1984; Bayside Blues; 1990–1992; Frankston Blues; 1993–present
- Arena: Jubilee Park Stadium
- Location: Frankston, Victoria
- Team colors: Navy blue, light blue and white
- Main sponsor: Frankston RSL; Powerade
- CEO: Wayne Holdsworth
- President: Tim Bower
- Vice-president: Grant Dennis
- Head coach: M: Andrew Harms; W: Jo Wood
- Championships: Men: ABA (1): 1982; SEABL (1): 1982; NBL1 South (1): 2026; Women: ABA (3): 1993; 1997; 2004; SEABL (3): 1993; 1997; 2004
- Conference titles: Men: SEABL (6): 1992; 1993; 1995; 1998; 2000; 2009
- Website: NBL1.com.au

Frankston Blues is a NBL1 South club based in Melbourne, Victoria. The club fields a team in both the Men's and Women's NBL1 South. The club is a division of Frankston & District Basketball Association (FDBA), the major administrative basketball organisation in the City of Frankston. The Blues play their home games at Jubilee Park Stadium.

== Club history ==
=== Background ===
Frankston Basketball was established in 1959. In 1979, the Association moved into the Bardia Avenue stadium. That same year, the Frankston representative program was developed by Jason Placas, with the team competing in the VBA Championships in 1979 and 1980.

=== SEABL and NBL ===
In 1981, the Frankston Bears debuted in the inaugural season of the South East Australian Basketball League (SEABL). The Bears finish second on the SEABL ladder before going on to reach the ABA National grand final, where they lost to the Geelong Cats. The following year, the Bears won the SEABL championship and ABA National championship.

As a result of their success in 1982, the Bears joined the National Basketball League (NBL) for the 1983 season, but following the 1984 season, they left the NBL due to financial pressures becoming too much for the Association to handle. Also in 1984, a Frankston Bears women's team played in the inaugural season of the Women's Basketball Conference.

In 1986, Frankston joined forces with neighbouring Chelsea Association to form the Bayside Blues Basketball Club. This Club represented both Associations from 1986 to 1995, when Chelsea opted out because of financial commitments. During this time, a Bayside Blues team joined the inaugural SEABL women's season in 1990.

In 1991, the Bayside women finished second on the SEABL ladder and reached the ABA National grand final, where they lost to the Dandenong Rangers. In 1992, Bayside finished third on the SEABL ladder and reached ABA National grand final, where they lost to the Knox Raiders. In 1993, the Frankston Blues women finished first on the SEABL ladder to win their maiden SEABL championship. They went on to defeat the Broadmeadows Broncos in the ABA National grand final to win their first ABA championship. In 1994, they finished second on the SEABL ladder and reached their fourth straight ABA National grand final, where they lost to the Knox Raiders. In 1997, they finished first on the SEABL ladder and won their second SEABL championship. They went on to defeat the Townsville Sunbirds in the ABA National grand final to win their second ABA championship.

In 1992 and 1993, the Bayside men back-to-back SEABL conference championships. The team changed names to Frankston in 1994. The Blues men went on to win conference championships in 1995, 1998 and 2000, and were ABA National Runners-up in 1995 and 1998.

In 2004, the women's team won the SEABL championship, while the men's team won the South Conference title in 2009.

=== NBL1 ===
In 2019, following the demise of the SEABL, the Blues joined the NBL1 South. In 2022 at the NBL1 National Finals, the Blues men lost 85–74 in the championship game to the Rockingham Flames.

In July 2025, the Blues played their first NBL1 game at the new Jubilee Park Stadium.

In 2026, the Blues men reached the NBL1 South Grand Final, where they defeated the Eltham Wildcats 78–75 to win the championship. It marked the club's first men's title of any sort since a SEABL conference win in 2009.

== NBL Season by season ==
NBL champions	League champions	Runners-up	Finals berth

Season	Tier	League	Regular season					Post-season	Head coach
Season	Tier	League	Finish	Played	Wins	Losses	Win %	Post-season	Head coach
Frankston Bears
1983	1	NBL	6th	22	6	16	.273	Did not qualify	Tony Gaze
1984	1	NBL	8th	24	10	14	.417	Did not qualify	Tony Gaze
Regular season record				46	16	30	.348	0 regular season champions	
Finals record				0	0	0	.000	0 NBL championships	

As of the end of the 1984 season

*Note: In 1983 and 1984, the NBL was split into Eastern and Western divisions during the regular season.
