= Ballarat Miners =

- Leagues: NBL1 South
- Founded: 1986
- History: Men: Ballarat Miners; 1986–present Women: Ballarat Lady Miners; 1990–2010; Ballarat Rush; 2011–2021; Ballarat Miners; 2022–present
- Arena: Ballarat Sports Events Centre
- Capacity: 3,000
- Location: Ballarat, Victoria
- Team colors: Navy, Gold & White
- Main sponsor: Sixt, Selkirk, City of Ballarat
- CEO: Travis Merlo
- Head coach: M: Ray Borner; W: David Herbert
- Championships: Men: ABA (3): 1989; 1994; 1995; Women: VBL (5): 1995; 1996; 1997; 1998; 1999; Big V (3): 2000; 2001; 2002; ABA (2): 2005; 2006; SEABL (1): 2005
- Conference titles: Men: SEABL (5): 1987; 1989; 1990; 1991; 2001
- Website: NBL1.com.au
Home	Away

Ballarat Miners is a NBL1 South club based in Ballarat, Victoria, Australia. The club fields a team in both the Men's and Women's NBL1 South. The club is a division of Ballarat Basketball Association, the major administrative basketball organisation in the region. The Miners play their home games at Ballarat Sports Events Centre.

== Men's team history ==
=== Background ===
The Ballarat Basketball Association Inc. was incorporated in 1966 and then built its own freehold facility in 1969 on the corner of Grevillea Road and Dowling Street in Wendouree to later become known as the Ballarat Minerdome. Backed by a flourishing local basketball program and facilities at the forefront of regional basketball associations, Ballarat lodged an application in 1985 to join the South East Australian Basketball League (SEABL), with the Miners debuting in the SEABL in 1986.

=== The Dynasty (1987–1996) ===
With Brian Goorjian at the helm, Ballarat won the SEABL South Conference championship in 1987 in just their second season. Goorjian departed at the end of the 1987 season and was replaced by Al Westover, who subsequently took the team to a Conference three-peat from 1989 to 1991, taking the South Conference for the first two years before following it up with the East Conference when moving across conferences in 1991. The Miners also won the ABA National championship in 1989. Westover was honoured with the inaugural Coach of the Year award in 1990. During this time, Eric Cooks won SEABL MVP in 1989 and 1990.

The Miners accomplishments continued after the departure of Westover at the end of 1991, with Eric Lowe taking the side to conference runners-up in 1992 before Brendan Joyce took over in 1993. In Joyce's first season, the Miners went through the regular season with a 20–4 record, eventually losing the Conference Semi-final and finishing second overall. In 1994 and 1995, the team won back-to-back ABA National championships with win–loss ratios of 18–4 and 19–3. Joyce went one better than Westover, collecting consecutive Coach of the Year awards for his leadership over 1994 and 1995. 1996 saw Paul Hotchin take over as head coach and with an array of stars in his line-up, he helped take them to another final, eventually losing to North West Tasmania after a regular season record of 16–6.

During the four-year period with Hotchin and Joyce at the helm, Ballarat went 73–17 for the regular seasons, while also recording a 2–2 win–loss ratio in Conference Finals, and a 7–1 record for National Finals, to finish 82–20 in a period of dominance in the SEABL.

=== New era (2014–present) ===
The Miners returned to the post-season in 2014 after an eight-year hiatus and again in 2015. After missing the post-season in 2016, the Miners reached the SEABL South Conference final in 2017, marking their first conference final appearance in 16 years.

In 2019, following the demise of the SEABL, the Miners joined the NBL1 South. The NBL1 South season did not go ahead in 2020 due to the COVID-19 pandemic. In 2021, the Miners played out of the Ballarat Sports Events Centre.

In 2024, the Miners men reached the NBL1 South Grand Final, where they lost 79–70 to the Eltham Wildcats.

== Women's team history ==
Ballarat's top level women's basketball team was branded the Lady Miners when it entered the Victorian championship in 1984. The team played in the inaugural SEABL women's season in 1990 and then withdrew. They subsequently joined the Victorian Basketball League (VBL) and were later inaugural members of the Big V in 2000. Between 1995 and 2002, the Lady Miners won eight straight championships – five straight in the VBL Division One from 1995 to 1999 and then won the first three Big V championships.

In 2003, the team re-joined the SEABL and amalgamated with the Ballarat Miners in order to be administered under the one Ballarat Basketball Association. The team won the SEABL championship in 2005 and the ABA National championship in 2005 and 2006.

In 2011, the Lady Miners were renamed the Ballarat Rush.

In 2019, following the demise of the SEABL, the Rush joined the NBL1 South. The NBL1 South season did not go ahead in 2020 due to the COVID-19 pandemic.

In November 2021, Basketball Ballarat merged the female and male programs under the same banner, with the Ballarat Rush rebranded as the Ballarat Miners from 2022 onwards.
