= NBL1 =

Semi-professional basketball league in Australia

- Most recent season or competition: 2026 NBL1 season
- Sport: Basketball
- Founded: 2019
- First season: 2019
- General manager: Tyrone Thwaites
- No. of teams: 19 (South Conference); 13 (North Conference); 10 (Central Conference); 14 (West Conference); 15 (East Conference)
- Country: Australia
- Continent: FIBA Oceania (Oceania)
- Most recent champions: M: Gold Coast Rollers (1st title); W: Knox Raiders (2nd title)
- Most titles: M: Knox Raiders (2 titles); W: Knox Raiders (2 titles)
- Sponsor: Mitsubishi
- Level on pyramid: 2
- Related competitions: NBL
- Website: NBL1.com.au

The NBL1 is a semi-professional basketball league in Australia run by the National Basketball League (NBL). The league consists of five conferences: NBL1 South, NBL1 North, NBL1 Central, NBL1 West and NBL1 East, with each consisting of both men's and women's competitions. Each conference is run by their respective state governing body, with the league including 71 clubs from across every state and territory.

The NBL1 in 2019 was a single league and consisted of one conference. That conference would go on to become the South Conference in 2020 after the inclusion of the former Queensland Basketball League (QBL) and South Australian Premier League saw them become the new North and Central conferences. The league grew to four conferences in 2021 with the inclusion of the former WA State Basketball League (SBL) and then five conferences in 2022 with the inclusion of the former NSW Waratah League.

== History ==
In October 2018, following the demise of the South East Australian Basketball League (SEABL), Basketball Victoria announced a new senior elite league to take the reins as Australia's pre-eminent semi-professional basketball league. All Victorian-based SEABL teams joined the new league, while Eltham Wildcats, Knox Raiders, Ringwood Hawks and Waverley Falcons also joined the league from the Big V. The North-West Tasmania Thunder men and Launceston Tornadoes women also kept their place, as did Basketball Australia's Centre of Excellence teams. In February 2019, the league was named NBL1 after Basketball Victoria partnered with the National Basketball League (NBL).

After a successful first season in 2019, the NBL expanded the NBL1 in 2020 by introducing Basketball Victoria's inaugural 2019 league and teams as the new South Conference and partnering with Basketball Queensland and Basketball South Australia to make the Queensland Basketball League (QBL) and South Australian Premier League the new North and Central conferences. However, due to the COVID-19 pandemic, the 2020 season was cancelled for all three conferences.

In 2021, the league expanded to four conferences after partnering with Basketball Western Australia to make the State Basketball League (SBL) the new West Conference. The inaugural NBL1 National Finals was set to take place in 2021, comprising the champions of the four conferences. However, the event was cancelled due to the COVID-19 pandemic. The South Conference later cancelled the remaining weeks of its season due to ongoing complications with the pandemic.

In 2022, the league expanded to five conferences after partnering with Basketball New South Wales to make the Waratah League the new East Conference. Additionally, a club from Darwin, Northern Territory, the Darwin Salties, joined the North Conference in 2022 which saw the NBL1 become the first Australian sport league to have clubs based in and playing out of every state and territory in Australia. The NBL1 National Finals took place for the first time in 2022.

== Conferences ==
=== South Conference ===
Founded in 2019, the South Conference was the only NBL1 conference during its inaugural season and predominantly consisted of teams from the defunct South East Australian Basketball League (SEABL). The South Conference currently has 19 clubs spread across Victoria, Tasmania and South Australia.

=== North Conference ===
In 2020, the North Conference joined the league, becoming the second conference introduced following NBL1's merger with the former Queensland Basketball League (QBL). The North Conference currently consists of 13 clubs, all based in Queensland.

The Darwin Salties from the Northern Territory featured in the North Conference for three seasons before withdrawing following the 2024 season.

=== Central Conference ===
In 2020, the Central Conference joined the league, becoming the third conference introduced following NBL1's merger with the former South Australian Premier League. The Central Conference currently consists of 10 clubs, all of which are based in South Australia.

=== West Conference ===
In 2021, the West Conference joined the league, becoming the fourth conference introduced following NBL1's merger with the former Western Australian State Basketball League (SBL). The West Conference currently consists of 14 clubs, all of which are based in Western Australia.

=== East Conference ===
In 2022, the East Conference joined the league, becoming the fifth conference introduced following NBL1's merger with the former New South Wales Waratah League. The East Conference currently consists of 15 clubs, with 13 based in New South Wales and two based in the Australian Capital Territory.

== Current clubs ==
Spread across the five conferences, a total of 71 clubs compete in the league.

- South Conference: 19 clubs
- North Conference: 13 clubs
- Central Conference: 10 clubs
- West Conference: 14 clubs
- East Conference: 15 clubs

== List of National champions ==
Team	Men's		Women's	
Team	Titles	Winning seasons	Titles	Winning Seasons
Knox Raiders	2	2023, 2024	2	2025, 2026
Rockingham Flames	1	2022	0	
Warwick Senators	0		1	2022
Bendigo Braves	0		1	2023
Waverley Falcons	0		1	2024
Canberra Gunners	1	2025	0	
Gold Coast Rollers	1	2026	0	

== Sponsorship ==
=== Naming rights ===
- 2021 to 2023: Coles Express
- 2023 to present: Mitsubishi Motors Australia
