= Launceston Tornadoes =

- Leagues: NBL1 South
- Founded: 1993
- Folded: 2025
- History: Launceston Tornadoes; 1994–2025
- Arena: Elphin Sports Centre
- Location: Launceston, Tasmania
- Team colors: Red & white
- Championships: ABA (1): 1995; SEABL (1): 1995

The Launceston Tornadoes are a defunct Australian basketball team that played in the South East Australian Basketball League (SEABL) and NBL1 South. The team was based in Launceston, Tasmania, and played their home games at Elphin Sports Centre.

== Team history ==
The Launceston Tornadoes Basketball Club Inc was established in 1993. The Tornadoes women's basketball team debuted in the South East Australian Basketball League (SEABL) in 1994. In their second season, the Tornadoes won the 1995 SEABL championship. They went on to win the 1995 ABA National championship. In 1996, the Tornadoes finished as ABA National runners-up.

In 2010 and 2018, the Tornadoes finished as SEABL runners-up.

In 2019, following the demise of the SEABL, the Tornadoes joined the NBL1 South.

In September 2025, it was announced that a newly established Northern Tasmania Basketball Club would enter the 2026 NBL1 season with a men's and women's program, replacing the Tornadoes women and North-West Tasmania Thunder men.
