= Knox Raiders =

- Leagues: NBL1 South
- Founded: 1982
- History: Knox Raiders; 1982–2014; 2016–present
- Arena: State Basketball Centre
- Location: Wantirna South, Victoria
- Team colors: Blue and yellow
- CEO: Grant Harrison
- Chairman: David Thomas
- Head coach: M: Matt Nunn; W: Craig Simpson
- Championships: Men: ABA (1): 1991; SEABL (1): 2009; NBL1 (2): 2023; 2024; NBL1 South (1): 2023; Women: ABA (3): 1992; 1994; 1996; SEABL (4): 1992; 1994; 1996; 2013; NBL1 (2): 2025; 2026; NBL1 South (2): 2025; 2026
- Conference titles: Men: SEABL (6): 1991; 1994; 1996; 2006; 2008; 2009; Women: SEABL (2): 2012; 2013
- Website: NBL1.com.au

Knox Raiders is a NBL1 South club based in Melbourne, Victoria. The club fields a team in both the Men's and Women's NBL1 South. The club is a division of Knox Basketball Incorporated (KBI), the major administrative basketball organisation in the City of Knox. The Raiders play their home games at the State Basketball Centre.

== Club history ==
=== Early years ===
Knox Basketball was established in 1965 to provide youth from the City of Knox with a sporting and social infrastructure to develop and promote personal, team and social skills in a sporting environment. Founded by Alf Stevens, Alice Jago and Heather Kemp, it began as an after school competition at the Mossfield Avenue Facility, Ferntree Gully in 1974. In 1980, its headquarters moved to the 3 court facility in Park Crescent at Boronia which was later expanded to six courts in 1989.

=== SEABL ===
In 1982, Knox's senior program was established, with a Raiders men's team entering the South East Australian Basketball League (SEABL) that year. A women's team entered the SEABL in 1990 after playing in the Women's Basketball Conference (WBC). Knox were WBC grand finalists in 1987.

In 1991, the Raiders men were SEABL South Conference champions and ABA National champions. The men won five more conference titles in 1994, 1996, 2006, 2008 and 2009. They were ABA National runners-up in 1996 and won the SEABL championship in 2009. The Raiders women claimed the SEABL-ABA championship double in 1992, 1994 and 1996. In 1998 and 2005, the women finished as ABA National runners-up.

In 2012 and 2013, the Raiders women were back-to-back conference champions. They won the SEABL championship in 2013.

In November 2014, Knox Basketball Incorporated withdrew its Knox Raiders SEABL teams from the 2015 season due to its dire financial position. The Raiders requested they remain a financial member of the SEABL with the intention of returning in season 2016. The SEABL retained the club's financial guarantee with the Raiders classified as a non-playing member of the league in 2015.

=== Big V ===
In November 2015, KBI announced that their senior men's and women's teams would be playing in the Big V in 2016 instead of the SEABL.

=== NBL1 ===
In October 2018, KBI's Big V teams were entered into the NBL1 for its inaugural season in 2019. The NBL1 South season did not go ahead in 2020 due to the COVID-19 pandemic.

In 2023, the men's team won the NBL1 South championship and the NBL1 National championship. In 2024, the men's team lost in the NBL1 South elimination final but returned to the NBL1 National Finals as defending champions, where they won back-to-back NBL1 National championships.

In 2025, the women's team reached the NBL1 South Grand Final, where they defeated Geelong United 84–64 to win the championship. The men's team, who lost in the NBL1 South preliminary final and had been set to once again play at the NBL1 National Finals as the reigning champions, withdrew from the 2025 National Finals due to not being able to field a team. At the 2025 NBL1 National Finals, the Raiders women reached the championship game, where they defeated the Cockburn Cougars 93–72 to win the NBL1 National championship.

In 2026, the women's team reached the NBL1 South Grand Final, where they won back-to-back championships with an 80–54 win over the Waverley Falcons. At the 2026 NBL1 National Finals, the Raiders women returned to the championship game, where they defeated the Bankstown Bruins 86–73 to win their second consecutive NBL1 National championship.
