= South East Australian Basketball League =

Basketball league in Australia

- Sport: Basketball
- Founded: 1981
- First season: 1981
- Folded: 2018
- Country: Australia
- Continent: FIBA Oceania (Oceania)
- Most titles: M: Bendigo Braves (7 conference titles); W: Dandenong Rangers (8 titles)

The South East Australian Basketball League (SEABL) was a semi-professional basketball league in Australia comprising both a men's and women's competition. The SEABL began in 1981 and operated for 38 seasons until it was disbanded in 2018. The league was closely linked with the Australian Basketball Association (ABA) and over the years, the SEABL boasted teams from Victoria, New South Wales, Queensland, Tasmania, South Australia and the Australian Capital Territory.

== History ==
The SEABL was established in 1981 as a men's league. Separate South and East conferences were introduced in 1986. In 1990, a women's competition was introduced after the SEABL adopted the Women's Basketball Conference (WBC). The SEABL was closely linked with the Australian Basketball Association (ABA) during the 1980s and 1990s, with the ABA dissolving following the 2008 season. In 2012, the women's competition was divided into two conferences for the first time.

In December 2014, Basketball Australia took over the operations of the SEABL. Less than four years later, in August 2018, Basketball Australia disbanded the SEABL after they withdrew its support of the league and denied the proposal of a club-managed league.

In October 2018, Basketball Victoria created a new senior elite league and later in partnership with the National Basketball League (NBL) produced the NBL1 which debuted in 2019.

== League championships ==
=== Men ===
Teams	Conference Champions		Teams	League Champions	
Teams		Year(s) won	Teams		Year(s) won
Bendigo	7	1988, 1990, 2005, 2007, 2010, 2011, 2016	Mount Gambier	3	2014, 2015, 2017
Dandenong	6	1986, 1997, 2004, 2012, 2013, 2017	Geelong	2	1981, 2010
Knox	6	1991, 1994, 1996, 2006, 2008, 2009	Dandenong	2	1985, 2013
Frankston/Bayside	6	1992, 1993, 1995, 1998, 2000, 2009	Hobart	2	2008, 2018
Mount Gambier	6	2003, 2013, 2014, 2015, 2016, 2017	Frankston/Bayside	1	1982
Ballarat	5	1987, 1989, 1990, 1991, 2001	Melbourne	1	1983
Hobart	5	1997, 1998, 2000, 2002, 2008	Chelsea	1	1984
Geelong	5	1999, 2005, 2006, 2007, 2010	Knox	1	2009
Nunawading	3	1995, 2011, 2014	Nunawading	1	2011
Albury Wodonga	3	2001, 2012, 2015	Albury Wodonga	1	2012
Bulleen	2	1988, 1989	Bendigo	1	2016
NW Tasmania	2	1996, 2004			
Newcastle	1	1986			
Adelaide	1	1987			
NE Melbourne	1	1992			
Sydney	1	1993			
Broadmeadows	1	1994			
Kilsyth	1	1999			
Australian Institute of Sport	1	2002			
Canberra	1	2003			

=== Women ===
Teams	Conference Champions		Teams	League Champions	
Teams		Year(s) won	Teams		Year(s) won
Dandenong	3	2012, 2015, 2016	Dandenong	8	1990, 1991, 2001, 2010, 2011, 2012, 2015, 2016
Knox	2	2012, 2013	Bendigo	6	1999, 2000, 2003, 2006, 2007, 2018
Bendigo	2	2013, 2017	Knox	4	1992, 1994, 1996, 2013
Kilsyth	2	2015, 2016	Frankston	3	1993, 1997, 2004
Hobart	1	2014	Kilsyth	3	1998, 2002, 2008
Brisbane	1	2014	Brisbane	2	2009, 2014
Geelong	1	2017	Launceston	1	1995
			Ballarat	1	2005
			Geelong	1	2017
