= Shannon Seebohm =

Australian basketball coach (born 1988)

Townsville Flames
- Title: Head coach
- League: NBL1 North

Personal information
- Born: 1 February 1988 (age 38) Millicent, South Australia
- Listed height: 190 cm (6 ft 3 in)

Career information
- Playing career: 2006–2009
- Position: Guard
- Coaching career: 2011–present

Career history

Playing
- 2006–2007: Australian Institute of Sport
- 2007–2008: South Dragons
- 2009: Mount Gambier Pioneers

Coaching
- 2011–2014: Sydney Kings (assistant)
- 2014: Hornsby Spiders
- 2014–2016: Sydney Uni Flames
- 2017: Norths Bears
- 2018–2019: Newcastle Hunters
- 2019–present: Townsville Fire
- 2021–2022: Townsville Flames
- 2026–present: Townsville Flames

Career highlights
- 2× WNBL champion (2023, 2026); NBL1 North champion (2022); 2× Waratah League champion (2014, 2019); 5× WNBL Coach of the Year (2015, 2020, 2023–2025); 2× NBL1 North Coach of the Year (2021, 2022)

Shannon James Seebohm (born 1 February 1988) is an Australian basketball coach and former player who currently serves as head coach of the Townsville Flames of the NBL1 North and Townsville Fire of the Women's National Basketball League (WNBL). He had a brief playing career, featuring in the South East Australian Basketball League and National Basketball League. He spent a season with the South Dragons and represented Australia in junior national teams in 2006 and 2007. Transitioning to coaching in 2011, he was appointed head coach of the Sydney Uni Flames in 2014, where he earned WNBL Coach of the Year honours in his debut season. Seebohm joined the Fire in 2019, securing four additional Coach of the Year awards and leading the team to the WNBL championship in 2023. He won his second WNBL championship with the Fire in 2026.

== Early life ==
Seebohm was born in Millicent, South Australia.

== Playing career ==
=== SEABL and NBL ===
Seebohm attended the Australian Institute of Sport (AIS) in Canberra in 2006 and 2007, and he played for the AIS men's team in the South East Australian Basketball League (SEABL).

Seebohm joined the South Dragons of the National Basketball League (NBL) as a development player for the 2007–08 season. In December 2007, while training at the Melbourne Sports and Aquatic Centre, he collapsed and required CPR to be revived. He was rushed to the hospital, placed into an induced coma, and later underwent surgery to stabilise his heartbeat. Although he had appeared in three games with the Dragons, he never returned to play in the NBL after his recovery.

In 2009, Seebohm returned to the SEABL where he played in 20 games for the Mount Gambier Pioneers.

=== National team ===
In 2006, Seebohm played for the Australian Emus at the Albert Schweitzer Tournament in Germany, the William Jones Cup in Taiwan, and the FIBA Oceania Under-19 Championship in Australia.

In 2007, Seebohm played for Australia at the FIBA Under-19 World Championship in Serbia. He averaged 7.1 points and 2.2 rebounds in nine games.

== Coaching career ==
=== NBL and WNBL ===
Seebohm made his coaching debut in 2011 as an assistant coach with the Sydney Kings of the NBL. He spent three seasons in that role under head coach Shane Heal.

In July 2014, Seebohm was appointed head coach of the Sydney Uni Flames of the Women's National Basketball League (WNBL). He led the Flames to the semi-finals in the 2014–15 season and was subsequently named WNBL Coach of the Year. He left the Flames following the 2015–16 season.

In June 2019, Seebohm was appointed head coach of the Townsville Fire of the WNBL on a three-year deal. In the 2019–20 WNBL season, the Fire finished at the bottom of the ladder.

In the 2020 WNBL Hub season in Queensland, Seebohm led the Fire to second position on the ladder and was subsequently named WNBL Coach of the Year for the second time. The Fire reached the grand final, where they lost 99–82 to the Southside Flyers.

In December 2020, Seebohm extended his contract with the Fire for an extra two seasons.

In the 2022–23 WNBL season, Seebohm led the Fire to the WNBL championship behind a 16-game winning streak, as he was named Coach of the Year for the third time.

In August 2023, Seebohm signed a three-year contract extension with the Fire.

In the 2023–24 WNBL season, the Fire finished in first place but lost to the Perth Lynx in the semi-finals. He was named WNBL Coach of the Year for the fourth time.

In the 2024–25 WNBL season, Seebohm secured his fifth Coach of the Year award, surpassing Tom Maher for most Coach of the Year titles in WNBL history. The Fire reached the grand final series, where they lost 2–0 to the Bendigo Spirit.

In the 2025–26 WNBL season, Seebohm led the Fire to the minor premiership with a 19–4 record. The Fire went on to reach another grand final series, where they defeated the Perth Lynx 2–0 to win the WNBL championship.

=== State leagues ===
In 2014, Seebohm coached the Hornsby Spiders women's team of the Waratah League to the championship. He had coached at the club for around three and a half years when in 2015 he was promoted as the head coach of the National Intensive Training Program, which scouts talent for Basketball New South Wales.

In 2017, Seebohm coached the Norths Bears women's team to a runner-up finish in the Waratah League.

Seebohm joined the Newcastle Hunters women's team as head coach in 2018. He also served as Newcastle Basketball's director of coaching. He led the Hunters to the Waratah League championship in 2019.

In December 2020, Seebohm was appointed head coach of the Townsville Flames of the NBL1 North for the 2021 season. He was named the NBL1 North Women's Coach of the Year after leading the Flames to a top-three finish. He was re-appointed Flames coach in November 2021, and went on to win his second straight NBL1 North Women's Coach of the Year in the 2022 season.

In April 2026, Seebohm re-joined the Townsville Flames as head coach for the 2026 NBL1 North season. The Flames made the grand final series, but lost 2–1 to the Mackay Meteorettes.

=== National teams ===
In March 2015, Seebohm was appointed head coach of the Australia women's national under-17 basketball team, the Sapphires. He led the Sapphires to the gold medal at the 2016 FIBA Under-17 World Championship and the bronze medal at the 2018 FIBA Under-17 World Cup.

In 2019, Seebohm served as head coach of the Australian women's team at the World University Games, where he guided the Emerging Opals to victory, defeating the USA in the gold medal match 80–72.

Seebohm served as caretaker coach of the Australian Opals at the 2023 FIBA Women's Asia Cup in the absence of Sandy Brondello, where the team won bronze. He re-joined the Opals as assistant coach for the 2024 FIBA Olympic Qualifiers in Brazil and the 2024 Summer Olympics in Paris.

== Personal life ==
Seebohm's father, Peter, played basketball in South Australia and is well known in the state's south east. His sister Kate also played basketball and was coached by Seebohm at the Norths Bears.

Seebohm's wife Jaimee (née Kennedy) is also a basketball player, with the couple having been a husband-wife, coach-player duo multiple times. They met as 18-year-olds at the Australian Institute of Sport. Jaimee gave birth to the couple's first child in March 2015.
