= Tom Garlepp =

Australian basketball player (born 1986)

Personal information
- Born: 20 April 1986 (age 40) Calgary, Alberta, Canada
- Listed height: 204 cm (6 ft 8 in)
- Listed weight: 106 kg (234 lb)

Career information
- High school: Aquinas College (Perth, Western Australia)
- College: UC Santa Barbara (2005–2007)
- Playing career: 2002–2020
- Position: Forward
- Number: 7, 14
- Coaching career: 2017–present

Career history

Playing
- 2002: East Perth Eagles
- 2003: Perry Lakes Hawks
- 2004: Australian Institute of Sport
- 2005–2009: Perry Lakes Hawks
- 2007–2009: Perth Wildcats
- 2009–2010: Adelaide 36ers
- 2010: Sandringham Sabres
- 2010–2012: Gold Coast Blaze
- 2011: Brisbane Capitals
- 2012–2013: Bendigo Braves
- 2012–2018: Sydney Kings
- 2014: Norths Bears
- 2015: Super City Rangers
- 2016: Illawarra Hawks
- 2016: Rockhampton Rockets
- 2017: Hobart Chargers
- 2018; 2020: Norths Bears

Coaching
- 2017: Norths Bears (assistant)
- 2018–2020: Norths Bears
- 2019–2020: Sydney Uni Flames (assistant)
- 2025–2026: Norths Bears
- 2025–2026: Sydney Flames (assistant)

Career highlights
- As player: Waratah League champion (2014); SBL champion (2003); Waratah League Grand Final MVP (2014); QBL Most Valuable Player (2011); SBL All Star Second Team (2008); As coach: NBL1 East men champion (2026); 2× Waratah League women champion (2018, 2020); Waratah League women Coach of the Year (2018); As assistant coach: Waratah League men champion (2017)

Thomas Michael Alexander Garlepp (born 20 April 1986) is an Australian basketball coach and former player. He played two years of college basketball in the United States for the UC Santa Barbara Gauchos before playing 11 seasons in the National Basketball League (NBL) between 2007 and 2018. He played for the Perth Wildcats, Adelaide 36ers, Gold Coast Blaze and Sydney Kings. He also had an extensive state league career, most notably playing for and coaching with the Norths Bears of the Waratah League / NBL1 East.

Garlepp served as head coach of the Australia women's national under-17 basketball team, the Sapphires, at the 2024 FIBA Under-17 Women's Basketball World Cup after helping them win gold at the 2023 FIBA Under-16 Women's Asian Championship.

== Early life ==
Garlepp was born in Calgary, Alberta, Canada. He grew up in Perth, Western Australia, where he attended Aquinas College. In his senior year at Aquinas, Garlepp averaged 25 points, 12 rebounds, 4 assists and 5 blocked shots per game, leading the team to the State High School Championships and to a bronze medal at the National Championships. He also played Australian rules football as a youth.

== Playing career ==
=== Early years ===
Garlepp debuted in the State Basketball League (SBL) for the East Perth Eagles in 2002, playing three games. In 2003, he played 11 games for the Perry Lakes Hawks, helping them win the SBL championship.

In 2004, Garlepp moved to Canberra to attend the Australian Institute of Sport (AIS) and play for the AIS men's team in the South East Australian Basketball League (SEABL). In 25 games, he averaged 3.0 points, 3.8 rebounds and 1.6 blocks per game. He had a team-high 39 blocked shots for the season and set an AIS record with 10 blocked shots in one game.

Garlepp returned to the Perry Lakes Hawks in 2005 and continued with the team in 2006 and 2007.

=== College ===
Garlepp had a two-year stint in the United States playing college basketball for the UC Santa Barbara Gauchos between 2005 and 2007. The Gauchos played in the Big West Conference of the NCAA Division I. As a freshman in 2005–06, he played 26 games and averaged 2.3 points and 2.1 rebounds in 9.3 minutes per game. As a sophomore in 2006–07, he played 19 games and made seven starts, averaging 3.4 points and 2.4 rebounds in 13.8 minutes per game.

In May 2007, Garlepp transferred to the Westmont Warriors of the NCAA Division II. However, he later departed the program prior to the start of the 2007–08 season.

=== Professional ===
==== NBL ====
Garlepp began his National Basketball League (NBL) career with the Perth Wildcats in the 2007–08 season. In 29 games, he averaged 1.8 points and 1.8 rebounds per game. He was subsequently named the club's Young Player of the Year. He returned to the Wildcats for the 2008–09 NBL season but appeared in just six games.

Garlepp joined the Adelaide 36ers for the 2009–10 NBL season, but sat deep in the rotation. Injury limited him to just four games.

In April 2010, Garlepp signed with the Gold Coast Blaze. In 2010–11, he averaged 5.2 points and 3.4 rebounds in 28 games. In 2011–12, he averaged 3.6 points and 2.4 rebounds in 31 games.

In May 2012, Garlepp signed with the Sydney Kings. In 2012–13, he averaged 6.2 points and 4.2 rebounds in 30 games. In 2013–14, he was promoted to the starting five and averaged 8.8 points, 5.4 rebounds and 1.5 assists in 28 games. He was the winner of the 2013–14 Sydney Kings Coaches' Award.

In March 2014, Garlepp re-signed with the Kings on a two-year deal. In 2014–15, he was named co-captain and averaged 13.6 points, 4.1 rebounds, 2.3 assists and 1.0 blocked shots per game. He scored a season-high 24 points against the New Zealand Breakers on 26 December 2014. He won both the Sydney Kings Most Inspirational Award and the Sydney Kings Members Player of the Year Award. In 2015–16, Garlepp continued as co-captain and was named the Kings' Club MVP after averaging 14 points, four rebounds and two assists per game while playing in every game of the season. He surpassed the 200-game mark during the season.

In April 2016, Garlepp re-signed with the Kings on a two-year deal. In 2016–17, he averaged 5.6 points, 2.6 rebounds and 1.1 assists in 28 games. In 2017–18, he averaged 2.5 points and 1.2 rebounds in 21 games. He was regularly overlooked for playing time during the 2017–18 season by coach Andrew Gaze.

After six seasons with Sydney, Garlepp finished his NBL career with 263 games, 163 of them with the Kings.

==== Australian state leagues and NZNBL ====
Garlepp was originally named on the Southern Districts Spartans roster for the 2008 SEABL season, but instead re-joined the Perry Lakes Hawks for the 2008 State Basketball League season. In 20 games, he averaged 25 points per game. He missed the end of the season due to injury. He was named to the SBL All Star Second Team.

With the Hawks in the 2009 State Basketball League season, Garlepp helped the team reach the SBL Grand Final, where they were defeated 85–77 by the Lakeside Lightning. He scored a team-high 17 points in the grand final. In 29 games, he averaged 26.38 points, 11.03 rebounds and 4.31 assists per game.

Garlepp joined the Sandringham Sabres for the 2010 SEABL season, where he averaged 16.4 points and nine rebounds per game.

Garlepp joined the Brisbane Capitals of the Queensland Basketball League (QBL) for the 2011 season. He was named QBL MVP after averaging 26 points and 10 rebounds, including having 47 points and 20 rebounds in a game midway through the season.

Garlepp joined the Bendigo Braves for the 2012 SEABL season. In 27 games, he averaged 18.7 points, 9.6 rebounds and 1.8 assists per game. He was named the Braves' Club MVP.

Garlepp re-joined the Braves for the 2013 SEABL season, where he averaged 19.5 points, 7.4 rebounds and 2.0 assists in 25 games. He played alongside his brother, Josh, during the 2013 season.

In 2014, Garlepp joined the Norths Bears of the Waratah League. He helped the Bears reach the grand final, where they defeated the Sydney Comets 100–85 to win the Waratah League championship. Garlepp was named grand final MVP. In eight games, he averaged 21.1 points, 8.3 rebounds, 2.4 assists, 1.1 steals and 2.8 blocks per game.

Garlepp joined the Super City Rangers of the New Zealand National Basketball League (NZNBL) for the 2015 season. In 18 games, he averaged 20.4 points, 6.4 rebounds and 2.1 assists per game.

Garlepp started the 2016 Waratah League season with the Illawarra Hawks before joining the Rockhampton Rockets midway through the 2016 QBL season. After five games for the Rockets, he returned to the Hawks. He averaged 23.2 points, 8.2 rebounds and 2.0 assists per game for the Rockets. In eight games for the Hawks, he averaged 29.6 points, 9.1 rebounds, 2.0 assists, 2.3 steals and 1.3 blocks per game.

Garlepp joined the Hobart Chargers for the 2017 SEABL season. He suffered an ankle injury in May that sidelined him for three weeks. He was later absent from the team in July due to the birth of his son. In 15 games, he averaged 19.1 points, 6.7 rebounds and 2.4 assists per game.

In 2018, Garlepp played four games for the Norths Bears in the Waratah League. His final playing stint came in 2020 when he played nine games for the Bears in the Waratah League.

=== National team ===
In 2004, Garlepp played for the Australia men's national under-18 basketball team at the Albert Schweitzer Tournament.

In 2018, Garlepp debuted for the Australia men's national 3x3 team and helped them win the FIBA 3x3 Asia Cup behind his tournament MVP performance.

== Coaching career ==
=== State leagues ===
In 2017, while playing for the Hobart Chargers, Garlepp also served as an assistant coach with the Norths Bears men's team. He was part of the Bears' Waratah League championship when the team won 92–78 in the grand final over the Manly Warringah Sea Eagles.

In 2018, Garlepp served as head coach of the Norths Bears women's team. He was named Waratah League Coach of the Year and guided the Bears to the Waratah League women's championship with a 90–70 grand final win over the Sutherland Sharks.

In 2020, Garlepp won his second Waratah League championship with the Bears women following an 81–71 grand final win over the Central Coast Crusaders.

In October 2024, Garlepp was appointed head coach of the Norths Bears men's team in the NBL1 East for the 2025 NBL1 season. He was reappointed as head coach of the Bears men for the 2026 season. He guided the Bears to the NBL1 East Grand Final, where they won the NBL1 East men championship with a 76–64 victory over the Sutherland Sharks.

=== WNBL ===
In July 2019, Garlepp joined the Sydney Uni Flames of the Women's National Basketball League (WNBL) as an assistant coach for the 2019–20 season.

Garlepp served as an assistant coach for the Sydney Flames during the 2025–26 WNBL season, with his wife Renae Garlepp serving as head coach.

=== National team ===
In May 2023, Garlepp was appointed head coach of the Australia women's national under-17 basketball team, the Sapphires. He guided the team to the gold medal at the 2023 FIBA Under-16 Women's Asian Championship in Jordan. He coached the Sapphires at the 2024 FIBA Under-17 Women's Basketball World Cup in Mexico.

Garlepp coached the Sapphires at the 2026 FIBA Under-17 Women's Basketball World Cup in Czechia, where they reached the bronze medal game.

=== Other ===
In 2021, Garlepp coached the University of Sydney men's team to a minor premiership in the University Basketball League (UBL). In 2022, he guided the team to the UBL championship.

In 2025, Garlepp coached the Basketball New South Wales under 20 women's state team for the seventh straight year.

== Personal life ==
Garlepp is the son of Michael and Robyn Garlepp. His father is a life member of the Perry Lakes Hawks. His younger brother, Josh, is also a former basketball player and worked as a reporter with Fox Sports. He and Josh played 3x3 basketball together.

In May 2014, Garlepp married fellow basketball player, Renae Camino, in Wollongong. The couple have two children.

Garlepp obtained a Master of Coaching and Education degree at the University of Sydney. He worked at Saint Ignatius' College Riverview as the basketball program coordinator and first V coach before becoming the senior program operations director at the Northern Suburbs Basketball Association in May 2023.
