= Wani Swaka Lo Buluk =

Australian basketball player (born 2001)

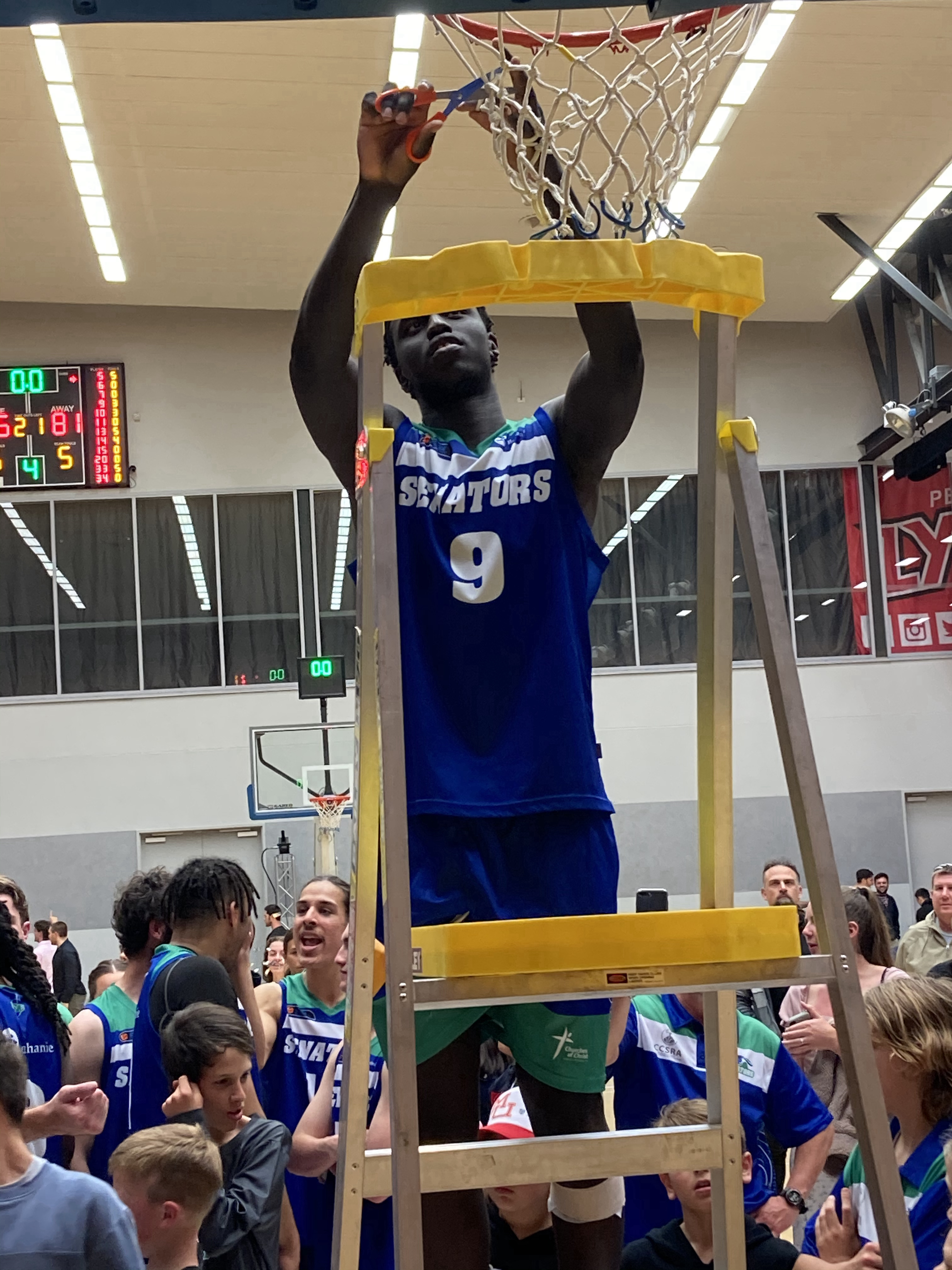
- Swaka Lo Buluk with the Warwick Senators in 2020

No. 9 – Illawarra Hawks
- Position: Shooting guard / small forward
- League: NBL

Personal information
- Born: 9 June 2001 (age 25) Sudan
- Listed height: 198 cm (6 ft 6 in)
- Listed weight: 88 kg (194 lb)

Career information
- High school: La Salle College (Perth, Western Australia); Lake Ginninderra College (Canberra, ACT)
- Playing career: 2017–present

Career history
- 2017–2018: BA Centre of Excellence
- 2018–2021: Perth Wildcats
- 2019–2020: Warwick Senators
- 2021: Albury Wodonga Bandits
- 2021–2022: Sydney Kings
- 2022: USC Rip City
- 2022–present: Illawarra Hawks
- 2023: Sydney Comets
- 2024: Darwin Salties
- 2025: Hawke's Bay Hawks
- 2026: Norths Bears

Career highlights
- 4× NBL champion (2019, 2020, 2022, 2025); NBL Cup winner (2021); NBL1 East champion (2026); WCC champion (2020)
Medals
Men's basketball
Representing Australia
FIBA Asia Cup
Gold medal – first place	2022 Jakarta
FIBA Asia Under-16 Championship
Gold medal – first place	2017 China	Team

Wani Lodu Swaka Lo Buluk (born 9 June 2001) is a Sudanese-Australian professional basketball player for the Illawarra Hawks of the National Basketball League (NBL). Opting to forgo college basketball in the United States to begin his professional career in Australia, he made his debut for the Perth Wildcats in the NBL in 2018. He won two NBL championships with the Wildcats over three years before joining the Sydney Kings in 2021 and winning a third championship in 2022. He won his fourth NBL championship with Illawarra in 2025. He also helped the Warwick Senators win the West Coast Classic in 2020.

== Early life and career ==
Swaka Lo Buluk was born in Sudan and moved to Perth as a four-year-old. He attended La Salle College in Perth and then spent two years at the Australian Institute of Sport's NBA Global Academy in Canberra. He also attended Lake Ginninderra College while at the AIS.

Swaka Lo Buluk played two seasons in the South East Australian Basketball League (SEABL) with the BA Centre of Excellence. He averaged 2.4 points and 1.2 rebounds in 13 games in 2017 and then 1.6 points and 1.6 rebounds in five games in 2018.

At the 2018 Under 18 National Championships, he played a key role in leading Western Australia to its first title since 2001, contributing 16 points in the gold medal game.

== Professional career ==
In the lead-up to the 2018–19 NBL season, Swaka Lo Buluk played for the Perth Wildcats during the pre-season when a large portion of the squad was on international duties. In December 2018, he joined the Wildcats as a development player and became the youngest player to debut for the team at 17 years old. He also became the sixth youngest player in NBL history to score on debut. He played four games during the season and received minutes in Game 3 of the NBL Grand Final series against Melbourne United. He was a member of the Wildcats' championship-winning squad in March 2019. Following the season, he signed a scholarship agreement with California Baptist University.

For the 2019 SBL season, Swaka Lo Buluk joined the Warwick Senators. In 20 games, he averaged 12.1 points, 4.7 rebounds and 3.6 assists per game.

On 15 July 2019, Swaka Lo Buluk signed a three-year contract with the Wildcats, opting to forgo college basketball in the United States to begin his professional career in Australia. However, on 3 September 2019, he was ruled out for three to four months after injuring his right ankle at pre-season practice. He suffered a torn syndesmosis and underwent surgery. He returned from injury to make his 2019–20 season debut on 21 December against Melbourne. On 15 February 2020, in the Wildcats' regular-season finale, he made his first NBL start and recorded eight points and four rebounds in a 94–79 win over the Adelaide 36ers. In March 2020, he was crowned an NBL champion for the second year in a row. He averaged 1.9 points in 13 games during the season.

He re-joined the Warwick Senators in 2020 and helped them win the West Coast Classic. In the grand final, the Senators defeated the Perry Lakes Hawks 96–81, with Swaka Lo Buluk recording nine points and six rebounds. In 13 games, he averaged 10.0 points, 4.3 rebounds and 3.4 assists per game.

Swaka Lo Buluk missed pre-season action leading up to the 2020–21 NBL season due to a groin aggravation. He helped the Wildcats reach the 2021 NBL Grand Final series, where they lost 3–0 to Melbourne United. He averaged 1.3 points in 33 games during the season. The Wildcats decided to not take up the club option on his contract following the season, making him a free agent.

After playing for the Albury Wodonga Bandits of the NBL1 South during the 2021 NBL1 season, Swaka Lo Buluk joined the Sydney Kings for the 2021–22 NBL season, initially as an injury replacement player for Dejan Vasiljevic, before becoming an integral part of the squad. On 13 January 2022, he scored a career-high 17 points in a 97–89 loss to the Illawarra Hawks. He helped the Kings win the 2022 NBL championship.

Swaka Lo Buluk joined the USC Rip City of the NBL1 North for the 2022 season. In 11 games, he averaged 12.55 points, 3.55 rebounds, 1.82 assists and 1.55 steals per game.

On 20 May 2022, Swaka Lo Buluk signed a two-year deal with the Illawarra Hawks. Following the 2022–23 NBL season, he joined the Sydney Comets of the NBL1 East for the 2023 season. Following the 2023–24 NBL season, he joined the Darwin Salties for the 2024 NBL1 North season.

On 24 July 2024, Swaka Lo Buluk re-signed with the Hawks on a three-year deal. He was a standout defender to start the 2024–25 season while proving to be an offensive threat, averaging a career-high 8.3 points per game over the first six games. He helped the Hawks reach the NBL grand final series, where he won his fourth NBL championship after Illawarra defeated Melbourne United 3–2.

He joined the Hawke's Bay Hawks of the New Zealand National Basketball League (NZNBL) for the 2025 season.

In the 2025–26 NBL season, Swaka Lo Buluk started in all 33 games for the Illawarra Hawks and reached the 200-game mark. He was praised by head coach Justin Tatum as a standout perimeter defender, with Tatum noting his displeasure in Swaka Lo Buluk not being included as a Defensive Player of the Year finalist.

On 28 April 2026, Swaka Lo Buluk re-signed with Illawarra on a new two-year deal. In May 2026, he joined the Norths Bears for the rest of the 2026 NBL1 East season. He helped the Bears win the NBL1 East championship with a 76–64 grand final victory over the Sutherland Sharks. Swaka Lo Buluk scored a team-high 18 points.

== National team career ==
In 2018, Swaka Lo Buluk represented Australia at the Under-17 FIBA World Cup in Argentina and won gold at the Under-16 FIBA Asia Championship in China. He was named in the all-tournament team for the U16 Asian Championship. In 2019, he played for Australia at the Under-19 FIBA World Cup in Greece.

In June 2022, Swaka Lo Buluk was named in the Boomers' World Cup Qualifiers team.

In June 2026, Swaka Lo Buluk was named in the Boomers squad for the next window of the FIBA Basketball World Cup 2027 Asian Qualifiers in Perth in July.

== Personal life ==
His brother, Kuron, is also a basketball player. Kuron debuted for the East Perth Eagles in the NBL1 West in 2025.
