= Fabijan Krslovic =

Australian basketball player (born 1995)

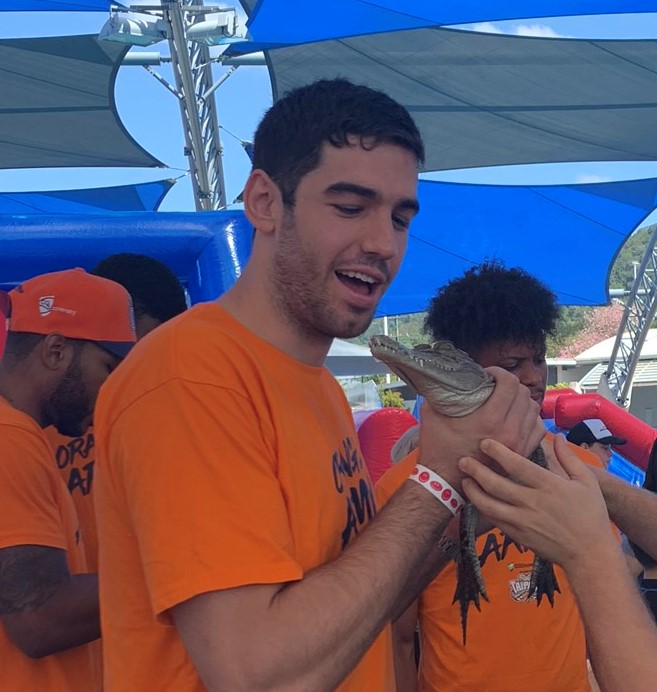
- Krslovic with the Cairns Taipans in 2019

No. 18 – Melbourne United
- Position: Power forward
- League: NBL

Personal information
- Born: 23 June 1995 (age 31) Sydney, New South Wales, Australia
- Listed height: 203 cm (6 ft 8 in)
- Listed weight: 106 kg (234 lb)

Career information
- High school: St Aloysius' College (Sydney, New South Wales)
- College: Montana (2014–2018)
- NBA draft: 2018: undrafted
- Playing career: 2014–present

Career history
- 2014: Norths Bears
- 2018–2019: Cairns Marlins
- 2018–2021: Cairns Taipans
- 2021–2025: Tasmania JackJumpers
- 2022: North-West Tasmania Thunder
- 2023: Southern Districts Spartans
- 2024: West Adelaide Bearcats
- 2025: Phoenix Hagen
- 2025: Sandringham Sabres
- 2025–present: Melbourne United
- 2026: Norths Bears

Career highlights
- NBL champion (2024); NBL1 South champion (2025); 2× Waratah League / NBL1 East champion (2014, 2026); NBL1 East Grand Final MVP (2026)
Medals
Men's basketball
Representing Australia
FIBA U17 World Cup
Silver medal – second place	2012 Lithuania	Team competition

Fabijan Ante Benedikt Krslovic (born 23 June 1995) is an Australian professional basketball player for Melbourne United of the National Basketball League (NBL). He played college basketball for the Montana Grizzlies.

== Early life and career ==
Krslovic was born in Sydney, New South Wales, in the suburb of Liverpool. He is of Croatian heritage. He grew up in Abbotsbury, where there is a large Croatian population. He attended St Aloysius' College in Sydney and was named the team MVP both as a junior and as a senior.

In 2014, Krslovic played for the Norths Bears in the Waratah League. In 14 games, he averaged 9.5 points, 6.1 rebounds and 2.6 blocks per game.

== College career ==
Krslovic joined the Montana Grizzlies basketball team whilst studying at the University of Montana in 2014, and as a freshman he made an immediate impact. In his first season, he was the team's second-leading rebounder and the 19th in the Big Sky Conference for rebounding average, and shot a 52%. He also played in all 33 games the team played, and started in 26 of them.

Across the remainder of his college career, Krslovic regularly was found higher up on the stats leaderboard, particularly for rebounds, shooting percentage, steals and blocks. He also played in all 132 games that the team played in during his time at college, and earned a total of 116 starts. He was also named on the Big Sky Academic All-Conference team for three consecutive years across his final years at college.

== Professional career ==
=== NBL ===
Krslovic joined the Cairns Taipans of the National Basketball League (NBL) as a development player for the 2018–19 season. He appeared in eight games and averaged 1.88 points and 1.25 rebounds per game.

On 13 June 2019, Krslovic was elevated to the roster of the Taipans for the 2019–20 NBL season and signed a one-year deal with a club option. In 30 games, he averaged 2.77 points and 2.37 rebounds per game.

On 7 July 2020, the Taipans took up the club option on Krslovic's contract for the 2020–21 NBL season. In 32 games, he averaged 5.06 points and 3.38 rebounds per game.

On 14 July 2021, Krslovic signed a two-year deal with the Tasmania JackJumpers.

On 14 March 2023, Krslovic re-signed with the JackJumpers on a two-year deal.

Krslovic parted ways with the JackJumpers following the 2024–25 season after 129 games over four seasons.

On 11 April 2025, Krslovic signed a two-year deal with Melbourne United.

=== Off-season stints ===
Krslovic joined the Cairns Marlins of the Queensland Basketball League for the 2018 season. In 17 games, he averaged 12.5 points, 8.2 rebounds, 2.4 assists and 1.1 steals per game. He returned to the Marlins for the 2019 QBL season and averaged 15.8 points, 9.6 rebounds, 3.2 assists, 1.0 steals and 1.2 blocks in 19 games.

Krslovic joined the North-West Tasmania Thunder of the NBL1 South for the 2022 season. In 14 games, he averaged 17.4 points, 12.4 rebounds, 3.6 assists, 2.1 steals and 1.3 blocks per game.

Krslovic joined the Southern Districts Spartans of the NBL1 North for the 2023 season. In 12 games, he averaged 12.4 points, 10.4 rebounds, 5.5 assists, 1.7 steals and 1.2 blocks per game.

Krslovic joined the West Adelaide Bearcats of the NBL1 Central for the 2024 season. In 14 games, he averaged 21.4 points, 14.1 rebounds, 5.7 assists and 1.5 steals per game.

On 15 February 2025, Krslovic signed with Phoenix Hagen of the German ProA for the rest of the 2024–25 season. In June 2025, he joined the Sandringham Sabres for the rest of the 2025 NBL1 South season. He helped the Sabres win the NBL1 South championship.

Krslovic joined the Norths Bears of the NBL1 East for the 2026 season, returning to the team for the first time since 2014. He helped the Bears win the NBL1 East championship with a 76–64 grand final victory over the Sutherland Sharks. Krslovic had eight points, 10 rebounds, four assists, two steals and two blocks in a grand final MVP performance.

== National team career ==
In 2012, Krslovic won a silver medal at the FIBA U17 World Cup whilst playing for the Australia men's national under-17 basketball team. The following year he also represented Australia in the under-19 team, however, he was unable to play at the World Championships in Prague.
