= Rob Beveridge =

Australian basketball coach (born 1970)

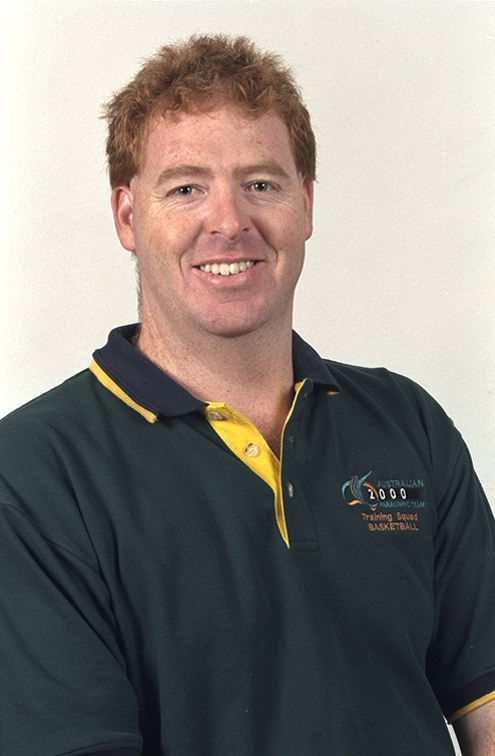
- Beveridge in 2000

Personal information
- Born: 15 January 1970 (age 56) Canberra, ACT, Australia

Career information
- High school: Canberra (Canberra, ACT); Hawker College (Canberra, ACT)
- Coaching career: 1994–present

Career history

Coaching
- 1994: Perth Breakers (assistant)
- 2001–2002: Norths Bears
- 2005: Hills Hornets
- 2007–2009: West Sydney Razorbacks / Sydney Spirit
- 2009–2013: Perth Wildcats
- 2013–2014: Shanghai Sharks
- 2015–2019: Illawarra Hawks
- 2021–2022: Southland Sharks
- 2023: Rockingham Flames (assistant)
- 2024: Pelita Jaya
- 2024–2025: Pelita Jaya (assistant)

Career highlights
- As head coach: NBL champion (2010); As assistant coach: IBL champion (2024)
Medals
Men's basketball
Representing Australia
Universiade
Bronze medal – third place	2019 Italy	Team competition
Commonwealth Games
Gold medal – first place	2006 Melbourne	Team competition
FIBA U19 World Cup
Gold medal – first place	2003 Greece	Team

Rob William Beveridge (born 15 January 1970) is an Australian professional basketball coach. After coaching the under-19 Australian Emus at the 2003 World Championship to a gold medal win, he began his National Basketball League (NBL) coaching career in 2007 with the West Sydney Razorbacks. The club re-branded as the Sydney Spirit and then folded; Beveridge subsequently joined the Perth Wildcats in 2009 and won an NBL championship in 2010. After four years, three grand finals and one championship, he left the Wildcats and joined the Illawarra Hawks in 2015. He led the Hawks to a grand final appearance in 2017 and left after four seasons.

== Early life ==
Beveridge was born in Canberra, ACT, where he attended Canberra High School, Hawker College and the University of Canberra. Growing up, he participated in athletics, soccer and basketball. He played youth representative basketball at national level for seven years and was a fan of the Canberra Cannons in the NBL. He received a Bachelor of Applied Science in Sports Studies in 1992 and a Graduate Diploma in Elite Sports Coaching in 1993 before beginning a career as a coach.

== Coaching career ==
=== Early years ===
==== Non-competition coaching ====
In 1993, Beveridge was a Scholarship Coach with the Australian Institute of Sport (AIS). During this time, he served under mentor Adrian Hurley and good friend Guy Molloy.

In 1997, Beveridge became the inaugural coach of the New South Wales Institute of Sport (NSWIS) basketball program. He served in that role until 2007. He built a reputation as an outstanding nurturer of talent and a developer of young men into professional basketballers.

Between 2005 and 2010, Beveridge coached the World Select Team at the Nike Hoop Summit in the United States. He also served as the Nike Basketball Camp director from 2005 to 2013.

==== WNBL and Waratah League ====
In 1994, Beveridge served as an assistant coach with the Perth Breakers of the Women's National Basketball League (WNBL) under head coach Guy Molloy.

In 2001 and 2002, Beveridge coached the Norths Bears in the Waratah League, guiding them to back-to-back grand final appearances and an ABA National Finals appearance in 2002. He returned to the Waratah League in 2005 to coach the Hills Hornets.

=== Australian NBL and China ===
==== West Sydney Razorbacks / Sydney Spirit (2007–2009) ====
On 14 March 2007, Beveridge was appointed head coach of the West Sydney Razorbacks, marking his first coaching gig in the National Basketball League (NBL). He guided the Razorbacks to 10 wins in 2007–08. Following the Sydney Kings' withdrawal from the NBL, the Razorbacks re-branded as the Sydney Spirit for the 2008–09 season. However, the Spirit quickly fell into financial difficulty and were saved from collapse mid season thanks to a rescue package from the NBL. Beveridge and the players all took significant pay cuts. He went on to lead the Spirit to 11 wins.

==== Perth Wildcats (2009–2013) ====
On 1 May 2009, Beveridge was appointed head coach of the Perth Wildcats for three seasons. He introduced a defence-oriented playing style for the 2009–10 NBL season which helped the Wildcats finish the regular season in first place with a 17–11 record and reach the NBL Grand Final. In the grand final series, the Wildcats defeated the Wollongong Hawks 2–1 to win the championship.

On 12 October 2011, Beveridge signed a two-year contract extension with the Wildcats. After back-to-back grand final defeats to the New Zealand Breakers in 2011–12 and 2012–13, Beveridge parted ways with the Wildcats on 29 May 2013.

==== Shanghai Sharks (2013–2014) ====
In December 2013, Beveridge accepted a short-term role as head coach of Chinese club the Shanghai Sharks. He left the team following the 2013–14 CBA season.

In September 2014, Beveridge moved to the Philippines to oversee the training camp of the Alaska Aces in the lead up to the 2014–15 PBA season.

==== Illawarra Hawks (2015–2019) ====
On 22 June 2015, Beveridge was appointed head coach of the Illawarra Hawks. After leading the Hawks to a semi-final appearance in the 2015–16 NBL season, he re-signed with the club for a further four years in March 2016. In the 2016–17 season, Beveridge guided the Hawks to the NBL Grand Final, where they lost 3–0 to the Perth Wildcats in the best-of-five series. In January 2019, he coached his 300th NBL game. On 20 February 2019, following the conclusion of the 2018–19 NBL season, Beveridge parted ways with the Hawks. It was reportedly an ugly split, with Beveridge describing his final season with the Hawks as the "worst environment" of his life.

During the 2019 off-season, Beveridge narrowly missed out on the Sydney Kings head coach vacancy. He subsequently served as a talent scout for the Washington Wizards in the 2019–20 NBA season.

==== Brisbane Bullets (2025) ====
During the 2025–26 NBL season, Beveridge was brought in by the Brisbane Bullets to aid new head coach Stu Lash. After the Bullets and Lash parted ways in December 2025, Beveridge was touted as Lash's potential replacement.

=== New Zealand NBL and NBL1 West ===
==== Southland Sharks (2021–2022) ====
In October 2019, Beveridge was appointed head coach of the Southland Sharks for the 2020 New Zealand NBL season. However, as a result of the COVID-19 pandemic, the season was initially postponed which was followed by the Sharks withdrawing from the 2020 season.

Beveridge returned to the Sharks for the 2021 New Zealand NBL season and guided the team to a top-four finish despite various injuries and illness setbacks. He returned to the Sharks for the 2022 season but missed five weeks mid season after sustaining a significant injury at his home. He parted ways with the Sharks in November 2022.

==== Rockingham Flames (2023) ====
In December 2022, Beveridge was appointed an assistant coach of the Rockingham Flames women's team for the 2023 NBL1 West season.

=== Indonesia ===
In December 2023, Beveridge was appointed head coach of Pelita Jaya of the Indonesian Basketball League (IBL) for the 2024 season. He guided the team to five wins in six games before the club shifted him to the position of technical director in early March. The team went on to win the IBL championship. He toured with Pelita Jaya in December 2024 when the team played exhibition games against NBL1 South teams in Melbourne.

Beveridge parted ways with Pelita Jaya in April 2025, midway through the 2025 season.

=== National team ===
Beveridge was part of the Australian national team program from 1999 to 2006. He was an assistant coach with the Australia women's national wheelchair basketball team at the 2000 Sydney Paralympics, where the team won silver. He next served as head coach of the Australian Emus at the 2003 FIBA Under-19 World Championship in Greece, guiding the team to a famous gold medal victory while setting world records with the highest ever score and winning margin in a gold medal game in international basketball. He next served as an assistant coach with the Australian Boomers at the 2004 Athens Olympics, 2006 Commonwealth Games in Melbourne, and the 2006 FIBA World Championship in Japan. The team won gold at the 2006 Commonwealth Games.

In April 2013, Beveridge narrowly missed out on the Australian Boomers head coach vacancy.

On 2 March 2018, Beveridge was appointed head coach of the Scotland national team for the 2018 Commonwealth Games on the Gold Coast. He took control of the "fledgling" team just six days before the opening game of the tournament and guided them to the bronze medal game, where they lost to New Zealand.

In July 2019, Beveridge served as head coach of the Australian Emerging Boomers, helping the team win bronze at the World University Games in Italy.

In February 2022, Beveridge served as interim head coach of the Australian Boomers for their World Cup qualifiers in Japan. He took over from Brian Goorjian due to his NBL commitments.

In April 2025, Beveridge joined the Indonesia men's national basketball team structure as head coach of the junior boys team.

== Coaching accolades ==
As of 2007, Beveridge had been head coach at 14 national championships, making it through to 10 grand finals (1990, 1994, 1998, 2000–2003, 2005–2007). He was also a 12-time winner of Coach of the Year awards including the New South Wales (NSW) Sports Federation Coach of the Year Award (2004), Basketball Australia's National Junior Male Coach of the Year (2000, 2004, 2005), NSW Basketball Coach of the Year (2000, 2002, 2003), NSW Basketball U22 Coach of the Year (1992, 1997, 1998), and Penrith Valley Sports Foundation Coach of the Year (2004). He was also a finalist for the Australian Sport Industry Coach of the Year Award in 2004. In 2010, he was named the Western Australia Department of Sport and Recreation High Performance Coach of the Year.

In October 2019, Beveridge was inducted into the Basketball NSW Hall of Fame.

== Personal life ==
Beveridge's paternal family's heritage is Scottish. His father John, originally from Blantyre, moved from Scotland to Australia in 1963. As of 2017, Beveridge's parents as well as his wife's family all lived in Canberra.

Beveridge and his wife Suellen have two sons, Jaydon and Noah, and a daughter Annie.

In late May 2022, Beveridge returned home to New South Wales for his daughter's 21st birthday following a Southland Sharks game. He was scheduled to return to New Zealand a couple of days later but tested positive for Covid-19. While in isolation, he was cleaning gutters at his house on a two-storey roof when he slipped and fell six metres, landing with his hip on a fence. The result was a broken scapula in three places, six broken ribs and a 12-day stay in hospital. Beveridge was informed by medical staff that he was lucky to have survived the fall.

=== Jobs ===
In October 2021, Beveridge was appointed high performance manager of the Rockingham Flames. He worked remotely for the Flames in 2022 while coaching in New Zealand.

In October 2023, Beveridge joined the Mandurah Magic as a coaching consultant.

In July 2026, Beveridge joined Basketball WA as a technical advisor with the Performance and Pathways program.
