= Northern bears (disambiguation) =

Northern Bears may refer to:

- Polar bears, a species of bears native to the Arctic
- North Sydney Bears, an Australian rugby league team based in Cammeray
- Norths Bears, an Australian basketball team based in Crows Nest, New South Wales
