= List of NBL1 East champions =

The champion teams of the NBL1 East, previously known as the Waratah League, are determined annually by a grand final championship day hosted by Basketball New South Wales.

== Champions ==
=== Results by year ===
Year	Men's Champion	Result	Men's Runner-up	Women's Champion	Result	Women's Runner-up	Ref
1991	Goulburn Bears		Wagga Wolves	Manly Warringah Sea Eagles		Parramatta Wildcats	
1992	Sydney Sonics		Bankstown Bruins	Manly Warringah Sea Eagles		Albury Cougars	
1993	Bankstown Bruins		Albury Cougars	Sutherland Sharks		Manly Warringah Sea Eagles	
1994	Parramatta Wildcats		Bankstown Bruins	Wagga Wolves		Bankstown Bruins	
1995	ACT		Parramatta Wildcats	Sutherland Sharks		ACT	
1996	Bankstown Bruins		Wagga Wolves	Parramatta Wildcats		ACT	
1997	Bankstown Bruins		Wagga Heat	Bankstown Bruins		Hills Hornets	
1998	Illawarra Hawks		Bankstown Bruins	Bankstown Bruins		Hills Hornets	
1999	Illawarra Hawks		Bankstown Bruins	Bankstown Bruins		ACT	
2000	Newcastle Hunters		Sutherland Sharks	ACT Academy		Norths Bears	
2001	Illawarra Hawks		Norths Bears	ACT Academy		Norths Bears	
2002	Sydney Comets		Norths Bears	ACT Academy		Norths Bears	
2003	Sydney Comets	102–80	Hills Hornets	Bankstown Bruins	101–75	Illawarra Hawks	
2004	Sydney Comets	101–83	Newcastle Hunters	Bankstown Bruins	69–66	Manly Warringah Sea Eagles	
2005	Sydney Comets		Newcastle Hunters	Bankstown Bruins		Canberra Nationals	
2006	Sutherland Sharks		Parramatta Wildcats	Bankstown Bruins		Sydney Comets	
2007	Sutherland Sharks		Sydney Comets	Hornsby Spiders		Bankstown Bruins	
2008	Sutherland Sharks		Newcastle Hunters	Sydney Comets		Bankstown Bruins	
2009	Parramatta Wildcats	109–104	Manly Warringah Sea Eagles	Hornsby Spiders	90–67	Bankstown Bruins	
2010	Manly Warringah Sea Eagles	65–60	Maitland Mustangs	Bankstown Bruins	74–67	Canberra Nationals	
2011	Illawarra Hawks	81–71	Newcastle Hunters	Canberra Nationals	66–35	Bankstown Bruins	
2012	Norths Bears	77–66	Sydney Comets	Bankstown Bruins	72–57	Manly Warringah Sea Eagles	
2013	Manly Warringah Sea Eagles	78–69	Sydney Comets	Illawarra Hawks	62–54	Hornsby Spiders	
2014	Norths Bears	100–85	Sydney Comets	Hornsby Spiders	94–63	Hills Hornets	
2015	Sydney Comets	69–67	Manly Warringah Sea Eagles	Bankstown Bruins	75–64	Sutherland Sharks	
2016	Bankstown Bruins	79–72	Sydney Comets	Newcastle Hunters	55–50	Illawarra Hawks	
2017	Norths Bears	92–78	Manly Warringah Sea Eagles	Manly Warringah Sea Eagles	58–56	Norths Bears	
2018	Newcastle Hunters	73–67	Norths Bears	Norths Bears	90–70	Sutherland Sharks	
2019	Central Coast Crusaders	74–72	Manly Warringah Sea Eagles	Newcastle Hunters	86–61	Canberra Nationals	
2020	Manly Warringah Sea Eagles	83–73	Sutherland Sharks	Norths Bears	81–71	Central Coast Crusaders	
2021	BA Centre of Excellence; Manly Warringah Sea Eagles	–	–	Sutherland Sharks; Newcastle Hunters	–	–	(Note: Dual winners were announced in 2021 after the season was cancelled due to COVID.)
2022	Canberra Gunners	76–73	Maitland Mustangs	Albury Wodonga Bandits	85–72	Sutherland Sharks	
2023	Sutherland Sharks	83–80	Maitland Mustangs	Norths Bears	71–56	Manly Warringah Sea Eagles	
2024	Maitland Mustangs	86–67	Canberra Gunners	Newcastle Falcons	85–78	Sutherland Sharks	
2025	Canberra Gunners	99–91	Illawarra Hawks	Manly Warringah Sea Eagles	89–61	BA Centre of Excellence	
2026	Norths Bears	76–64	Sutherland Sharks	Bankstown Bruins	90–85	Manly Warringah Sea Eagles	

=== Results by teams ===
Men			Women		
Teams		Year(s) won	Teams		Year(s) won
Sydney Comets	5	2002, 2003, 2004, 2005, 2015	Bankstown Bruins	11	1997, 1998, 1999, 2003, 2004, 2005, 2006, 2010, 2012, 2015, 2026
Bankstown Bruins	4	1993, 1996, 1997, 2016	Manly Warringah Sea Eagles	4	1991, 1992, 2017, 2025
Illawarra Hawks	4	1998, 1999, 2001, 2011	Newcastle Hunters/Falcons	4	2016, 2019, 2021, 2024
Sutherland Sharks	4	2006, 2007, 2008, 2023	Sutherland Sharks	3	1993, 1995, 2021
Manly Warringah Sea Eagles	4	2010, 2013, 2020, 2021	ACT Academy	3	2000, 2001, 2002
Norths Bears	4	2012, 2014, 2017, 2026	Hornsby Spiders	3	2007, 2009, 2014
Parramatta Wildcats	2	1994, 2009	Norths Bears	3	2018, 2020, 2023
Newcastle Hunters	2	2000, 2018	Wagga Wolves	1	1994
Canberra Gunners	2	2022, 2025	Parramatta Wildcats	1	1996
Goulburn Bears	1	1991	Sydney Comets	1	2008
Sydney Sonics	1	1992	Canberra Nationals	1	2011
ACT	1	1995	Illawarra Hawks	1	2013
Central Coast Crusaders	1	2019	Albury Wodonga Bandits	1	2022
BA Centre of Excellence	1	2021			
Maitland Mustangs	1	2024			
