= Wendy Laidlaw =

Australian basketball player

Personal information
- Born: 19 February 1959 (age 67) Sydney, New South Wales

Sport
- Country: Australia
- Sport: Women's Basketball

Wendy Laidlaw (born 19 February 1959) is a former Australian women's basketball player.

== Biography ==
Laidlaw played for the national team between 1981 and 1984, competing at the 1984 Olympic Games in Los Angeles. When Australia was informed they would attend the 1984 Olympics, Laidlaw stated, "I’m so happy. I haven’t been able to sleep since we’ve been home, just hoping Cuba would withdraw...Now we’re in the Games, it is out of this world." Laidlaw also represented Australia at one World Championship; 1983 held in the Brazil.

In the domestic Women's National Basketball League (WNBL) Laidlaw played for Sutherland Sharks and Wollongong Hawks. Laidlaw is the daughter of David Anderson, who participated in the 1952 and 1956 Olympic Games for Australia in the Eights Rowing Crew.
