= Maitland Mustangs =

Basketball team in Maitland, Australia

- Leagues: NBL1 East
- Arena: Maitland Federation Centre
- Location: Maitland, New South Wales
- Team colors: Red and white
- Championships: 1 (2024) (M); 0 (W)
- Website: NBL1.com.au

Maitland Mustangs is a NBL1 East club based in Maitland, New South Wales. The club fields a team in both the Men's and Women's NBL1 East. The Mustangs play their home games at the Maitland Federation Centre.

== Club history ==
Maitland Basketball Association (MBA) was established in 1957. In 1984, the Maitland Mustangs name was adopted. The club moved into the Maitland Federation Centre in 2000.

In 2010, the Mustangs men's team reached the Waratah League grand final, where they lost 65–60 to the Manly Warringah Sea Eagles.

The Mustangs women's team competed in the Waratah League up until 2008. After not competing in the 2009 and 2010 seasons, the Mustangs women returned to the Waratah League in 2011. They dropped out again in 2012, played in 2013 and 2014, and dropped out again in 2015. The Mustangs women continued to not participate between 2016 and 2018, returning in 2019. After dropping out again in 2020, they competed in the 2021 Waratah League season.

In October 2021, the Waratah League was rebranded as NBL1 East after becoming the East conference of NBL1. The Mustangs subsequently entered the 2022 NBL1 season. The men's team reached the NBL1 East grand final in 2022, where they lost 76–73 to the Canberra Gunners. In the 2023 season, the Mustangs men returned to the NBL1 East grand final, where they lost 83–80 to the Sutherland Sharks. In the 2024 season, the Mustangs men reached their third straight grand final, where they defeated the Gunners 86–67 to win their maiden NBL1 East championship.
