= 2023 NBL1 season =

- League: NBL1
- Sport: Basketball
- Duration: 11 March – 12 August (Conference seasons); 18–20 August (NBL1 National Finals)

National Finals
- Champions: M: Knox Raiders; W: Bendigo Braves
- Runners-up: M: Rockingham Flames; W: Norths Bears
- Grand Final MVP: M: Ke'Jhan Feagin (Knox Raiders); W: Megan McKay (Bendigo Braves)

NBL1 seasons
- ← 2022 2024 →

The 2023 NBL1 season was the fourth season of the NBL1. The season consisted of five conferences: South, North, Central, West and East.

The second annual National Finals were held in Perth, with both NBL1 National champions coming from the South Conference in the Bendigo Braves women and the Knox Raiders men.

== Background ==
The NBL1 had expanded in 2022 with the East Conference introduced alongside the South, North, Central and West. No further expansion occurred in 2023.

== Conference seasons ==
The season began on 11 March for the East Conference, 24 March for the North Conference, 25 March for the Central Conference, 31 March for the West Conference and 1 April for the North Conference. All conference finals were concluded by 12 August.

=== South ===
The women's minor premiers were the Bendigo Braves with a 22–0 record while the men's minor premiers were the Knox Raiders with an 18–4 record. Megan McKay of the Bendigo Braves was named women's MVP while Jack Purchase of the Melbourne Tigers and Daniel Trist of the Frankston Blues were named men's co-MVP.

The women's grand final saw the Bendigo Braves defeat the Waverley Falcons 83–78 while the men's grand final saw the Knox Raiders defeat the Sandringham Sabres 90–86. Amy Atwell of the Bendigo Braves was named women's grand final MVP while Bailey Nunn of the Knox Raiders was named men's grand final MVP.

=== North ===
The women's minor premiers were the Northside Wizards with a 16–3 record while the men's minor premiers were the Gold Coast Rollers with a 17–2 record. Courtney Woods of the Northside Wizards was named women's MVP while Jason Cadee of the Gold Coast Rollers was named men's MVP.

The women's grand final series saw the Northside Wizards defeat the Rockhampton Cyclones 2–0, with 87–52 in game one and 70–59 in game two, while the men's grand final series saw the Ipswich Force defeat the Gold Coast Rollers 2–1, with the Rollers winning 100–86 in game one and the Force winning 119–98 in game two and 109–85 in game three. Courtney Woods of the Northside Wizards was named women's grand final MVP while Nathan Sobey of the Ipswich Force was named men's grand final MVP.

=== Central ===
The women's minor premiers were the Sturt Sabres with an 18–0 record while the men's minor premiers were the West Adelaide Bearcats with a 15–3 record. Brooke Basham of the Forestville Eagles was named women's MVP while Jordan Forbes of the Sturt Sabres was named men's MVP.

The women's grand final saw the Norwood Flames defeat the Sturt Sabres 80–65 while the men's grand final saw the West Adelaide Bearcats defeat the Forestville Eagles 106–95. Ally Wilson of the Norwood Flames was named women's grand final MVP while Lachlan Olbrich of the West Adelaide Bearcats was named men's grand final MVP.

=== West ===
The women's minor premiers were the Cockburn Cougars with an 18–2 record while the men's minor premiers were the Rockingham Flames with a 19–3 record. Alexandra Sharp of the Willetton Tigers was named women's MVP while Devondrick Walker of the Rockingham Flames was named men's MVP.

The women's grand final saw the Cockburn Cougars defeat the Willetton Tigers 68–61 while the men's grand final saw the Geraldton Buccaneers defeat the Joondalup Wolves 86–80. Stephanie Gorman of the Cockburn Cougars was named women's grand final MVP while Johny Narkle of the Geraldton Buccaneers was named men's grand final MVP.

=== East ===
The women's minor premiers were the Manly Warringah Sea Eagles with a 20–2 record while the men's minor premiers were the BA Centre of Excellence with a 20–2 record. Nicole Munger of the Newcastle Falcons was named women's MVP while William Cranston-Lown of the Maitland Mustangs was named men's MVP.

The women's grand final saw the Norths Bears defeat the Manly Warringah Sea Eagles 71–56 while the men's grand final saw the Sutherland Sharks defeat the Maitland Mustangs 83–80. Jolene Anderson of the Norths Bears was named women's grand final MVP while Lochlan Hutchison of the Sutherland Sharks was named men's grand final MVP.

=== Champions summary ===
==== Women ====
Conference	Champion	Result	Runner-up
South	Bendigo Braves	83 – 78	Waverley Falcons
North	Northside Wizards	2 – 0 (87–52, 70–59)	Rockhampton Cyclones
Central	Norwood Flames	80 – 65	Sturt Sabres
West	Cockburn Cougars	68 – 61	Willetton Tigers
East	Norths Bears	71 – 56	Manly Warringah Sea Eagles

==== Men ====
Conference	Champion	Result	Runner-up
South	Knox Raiders	90 – 86	Sandringham Sabres
North	Ipswich Force	2 – 1 (86–100, 119–98, 109–85)	Gold Coast Rollers
Central	West Adelaide Bearcats	106 – 95	Forestville Eagles
West	Geraldton Buccaneers	86 – 80	Joondalup Wolves
East	Sutherland Sharks	83 – 80	Maitland Mustangs

== National Finals ==
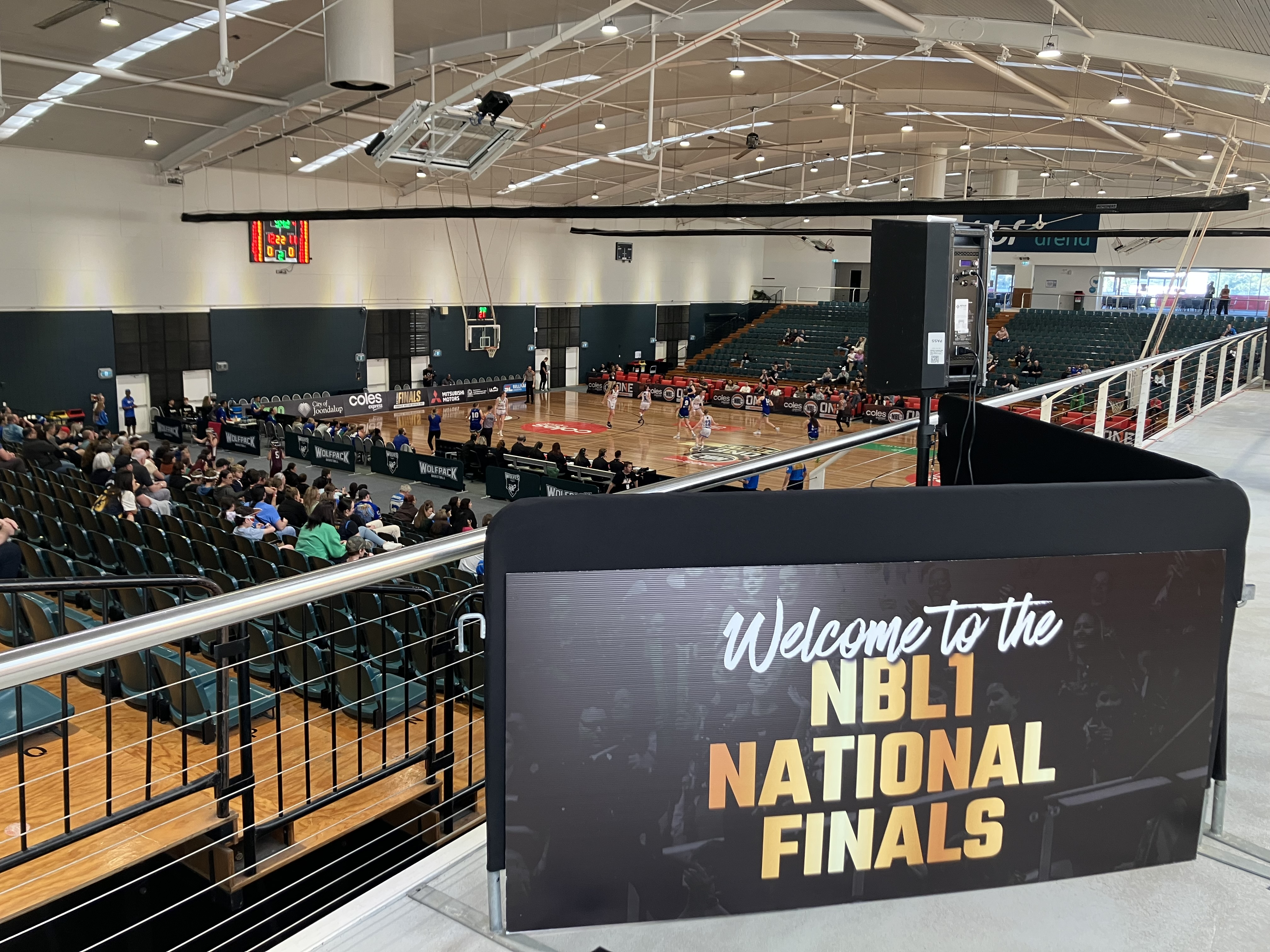
2023 NBL1 National Finals at HBF Arena

The 2023 NBL1 National Finals took place at HBF Arena in Perth between Friday 18 August and Sunday 20 August. It served as the second annual National Finals after the inaugural event took place in 2022.

The 2022 defending champions, the Warwick Senators women and the Rockingham Flames men, earned automatic qualification into the 2023 NBL1 National Finals. Had either team made their respective 2023 conference grand final, their opponents would have been guaranteed a spot in the National Finals. The Senators women finished the 2023 West season in fifth place and lost in the semi finals while the Flames men finished the 2023 West season in first place and lost in the preliminary finals. Joining them in the tournament were the champions from each of the five conferences.

The six women's and men's teams faced off on Friday and Saturday for a spot in the Championship Games on Sunday. Each team played two preliminary games in which they generated ranking points, with the top two ranked women's and men's teams then playing in the Championship Game.

Ranking points over the first two days included three points for a win, one point for each quarter won, and half a point for tied quarters. Zero points were awarded for winning overtime periods. The schedule for Friday was determined by a random draw. On Saturday, the highest point scorer from Friday played fifth place, the second highest played fourth place, and the third highest played sixth place. On Sunday, the top two point scores over Friday and Saturday played in the Championship Game.

Both South Conference teams were victorious in the Championship Games, with the Bendigo Braves women and the Knox Raiders men being crowned NBL1 National champions.

=== Day One – Friday ===
==== Women ====
- East vs North

18 August 2023
4:30 pm

Box score
Report

Norths Bears 104, Northside Wizards 81
Scoring by quarter: 30–20, 31–18, 19–24, 24–19
Pts: Emily Simons 20; Rebs: Jolene Anderson 9 Asts: Kate Seebohm 7	Pts: Amanda Johnson 24; Rebs: Amanda Johnson 14; Asts: Nadeen Payne 5
After Day 1: Norths 2nd (6 pts), Northside 5th (1 pt)

Showcourt 2, HBF Arena, Perth

- West vs South

18 August 2023
6:00 pm

Box score
Report

Cockburn Cougars 57, Bendigo Braves 101
Scoring by quarter: 18–29, 9–19, 12–29, 18–24
Pts: Stephanie Gorman 14; Rebs: Sarah Mortensen 6 Asts: Patricia Brossmann 3	Pts: Megan McKay 25; Rebs: McKay, Wilson 9 each Asts: Kelly Wilson 16
After Day 1: Cockburn 6th (0 pts), Bendigo 1st (7 pts)

Showcourt 1, HBF Arena, Perth

- Defending champion vs Central

18 August 2023
6:30 pm

Box score
Report

Warwick Senators 100, Norwood Flames 87
Scoring by quarter: 27–25, 31–17, 17–25, 25–20
Pts: Karly Murphy 26; Rebs: Barr, Clinch Hoycard, Murphy 14 each Asts: Natalie Burton 11	Pts: Ally Wilson 45; Rebs: Ally Wilson 18; Asts: Jada Rice 4
After Day 1: Warwick 3rd (6 pts), Norwood 4th (1 pt)

Showcourt 2, HBF Arena, Perth

==== Men ====
- South vs Central

18 August 2023
4:00 pm

Box score
Report

Knox Raiders 114, West Adelaide Bearcats 61
Scoring by quarter: 28–18, 26–11, 25–14, 35–18
Pts: Wayne Stewart Jr. 29; Rebs: Wayne Stewart Jr. 10; Asts: Ke'Jhan Feagin 10	Pts: Lachlan Hunter 18; Rebs: Nikolas DeSantis 6 Asts: Roxburgh, Staude 4 each
After Day 1: Knox 1st (7 pts), West Adelaide 6th (0 pts)

Showcourt 1, HBF Arena, Perth

- Defending champion vs North

18 August 2023
8:00 pm

Box score
Report

Rockingham Flames 106, Ipswich Force 88
Scoring by quarter: 30–26, 23–24, 31–20, 22–18
Pts: Marshall Nelson 28; Rebs: Jeremy Combs 14; Asts: Devondrick Walker 7	Pts: Deng Deng 27; Rebs: Deng Deng 12; Asts: Jason Ralph 10
After Day 1: Rockingham 3rd (6 pts), Ipswich 4th (1 pt)

Showcourt 1, HBF Arena, Perth

- West vs East

18 August 2023
8:30 pm

Box score
Report

Geraldton Buccaneers 98, Sutherland Sharks 76
Scoring by quarter: 25–17, 27–18, 22–30, 24–11
Pts: Johny Narkle 27; Rebs: Zac Gattorna 13; Asts: Shaun Stewart 8	Pts: Lochlan Hutchison 17; Rebs: Geoffrey Gerlach 8 Asts: Lochlan Hutchison 5
After Day 1: Geraldton 2nd (6 pts), Sutherland 5th (1 pt)

Showcourt 2, HBF Arena, Perth

=== Day Two – Saturday ===
==== Women ====
- 1st vs 5th

19 August 2023
2:00 pm

Box score
Report

Bendigo Braves 112, Northside Wizards 73
Scoring by quarter: 28–15, 26–29, 29–15, 29–14
Pts: Amy Atwell 44; Rebs: Megan McKay 12; Asts: Kelly Wilson 13	Pts: Lil Dart 20; Rebs: Johnson, Haynes 6 each Asts: Amanda Johnson 5
After Day 2: Bendigo 1st (13 pts), Northside 6th (2 pts)

Showcourt 2, HBF Arena, Perth

- 3rd vs 6th

19 August 2023
2:30 pm

Box score
Report

Warwick Senators 59, Cockburn Cougars 62
Scoring by quarter: 12–11, 18–16, 15–21, 14–14
Pts: Karly Murphy 22; Rebs: Natalie Burton 13; Asts: Natalie Burton 7	Pts: Jessie Edwards 22; Rebs: Edwards, Mortensen 11 each Asts: Stephanie Gorman 7
After Day 2: Warwick 3rd (8.5 pts), Cockburn 4th (4.5 pts)

Showcourt 1, HBF Arena, Perth

- 2nd vs 4th

19 August 2023
4:00 pm

Box score
Report

Norths Bears 110, Norwood Flames 79
Scoring by quarter: 25–25, 33–20, 23–24, 29–10
Pts: Madeleine O'Hehir 32; Rebs: Anderson, Simons 9 each Asts: Carla Pitman 5	Pts: Ally Wilson 47; Rebs: Wilson, Rice 8 Asts: Ally Wilson 5
After Day 2: Norths 2nd (11.5 pts), Norwood 5th (2.5 pts)

Showcourt 2, HBF Arena, Perth

==== Men ====
- 2nd vs 4th

19 August 2023
4:30 pm

Box score
Report

Geraldton Buccaneers 120, Ipswich Force 91
Scoring by quarter: 27–15, 24–27, 43–25, 26–24
Pts: Johny Narkle 30; Rebs: Liam Hunt 14; Asts: Shaun Stewart 9	Pts: Cameron Goldfinch 28; Rebs: Deng Deng 9 Asts: Jason Ralph 5
After Day 2: Geraldton 3rd (12 pts), Ipswich 5th (2 pts)

Showcourt 1, HBF Arena, Perth

- 1st vs 5th

19 August 2023
6:00 pm

Box score
Report

Knox Raiders 124, Sutherland Sharks 113 (OT)
Scoring by quarter: 27–32, 28–24, 28–20, 25–32, Overtime: 16–5
Pts: Wayne Stewart Jr. 28; Rebs: Wayne Stewart Jr. 15; Asts: Ke'Jhan Feagin 10	Pts: Jordan Mitchell 32; Rebs: Beasley, Mitchell 6 each Asts: Hutchison, Mitchell 8 each
After Day 2: Knox 2nd (12 pts), Sutherland 4th (3 pts)

Showcourt 2, HBF Arena, Perth

- 3rd vs 6th

19 August 2023
6:30 pm

Box score
Report

Rockingham Flames 129, West Adelaide Bearcats 96
Scoring by quarter: 32–21, 32–23, 34–30, 31–22
Pts: Jeremy Combs 26; Rebs: Tom Jervis 12; Asts: Marshall Nelson 7	Pts: Nikolas DeSantis 27; Rebs: Nikolas DeSantis 6 Asts: Nikolas DeSantis 5
After Day 2: Rockingham 1st (13 pts), West Adelaide 6th (0 pts)

Showcourt 1, HBF Arena, Perth

=== Day Three – Sunday ===
==== Championship Games ====
===== Women =====
====== Rosters ======
Bendigo Braves – 1st
#	Player
Starters
5	Kasey Burton
6	Cassidy McLean
12	Amy Atwell
22	Kelly Wilson (C)
25	Megan McKay
Reserves
1	Caitlin Richardson
3	Poppy Blanch
4	Meg McCarthy
8	Millicent Wicks
10	Jessie Rennie
14	Madeline Sexton
17	Jessica Mangan
Pos	Coach
HC	Mark Alabakov
AC	Michael Gibbins

Norths Bears – 2nd
#	Player
Starters
3	Jolene Anderson
5	Emily Simons
6	Kate Seebohm (C)
9	Madeleine O'Hehir
15	Sarah Schicher
Reserves
4	Carla Pitman
7	Holly Wills
8	Jessica Bygatee
10	Lauryn Walker
12	Caitlyn Martin
13	Peggy Schell
22	Emma Donnelly
Pos	Coach
HC	Renae Garlepp
AC	Geena Valos

====== Game summary ======
Kayo Sports

20 August 2023
11:00 am

Box score
Report
Highlights

Bendigo Braves 114, Norths Bears 87
Scoring by quarter: 22–21, 29–22, 34–16, 29–28
Pts: Megan McKay 46; Rebs: Megan McKay 15; Asts: Kelly Wilson 18	Pts: Madeleine O'Hehir 23; Rebs: Jolene Anderson 9 Asts: Kate Seebohm 10
Bendigo wins NBL1 National Championship

Showcourt 1, HBF Arena, Perth
MVP: Megan McKay (Braves)

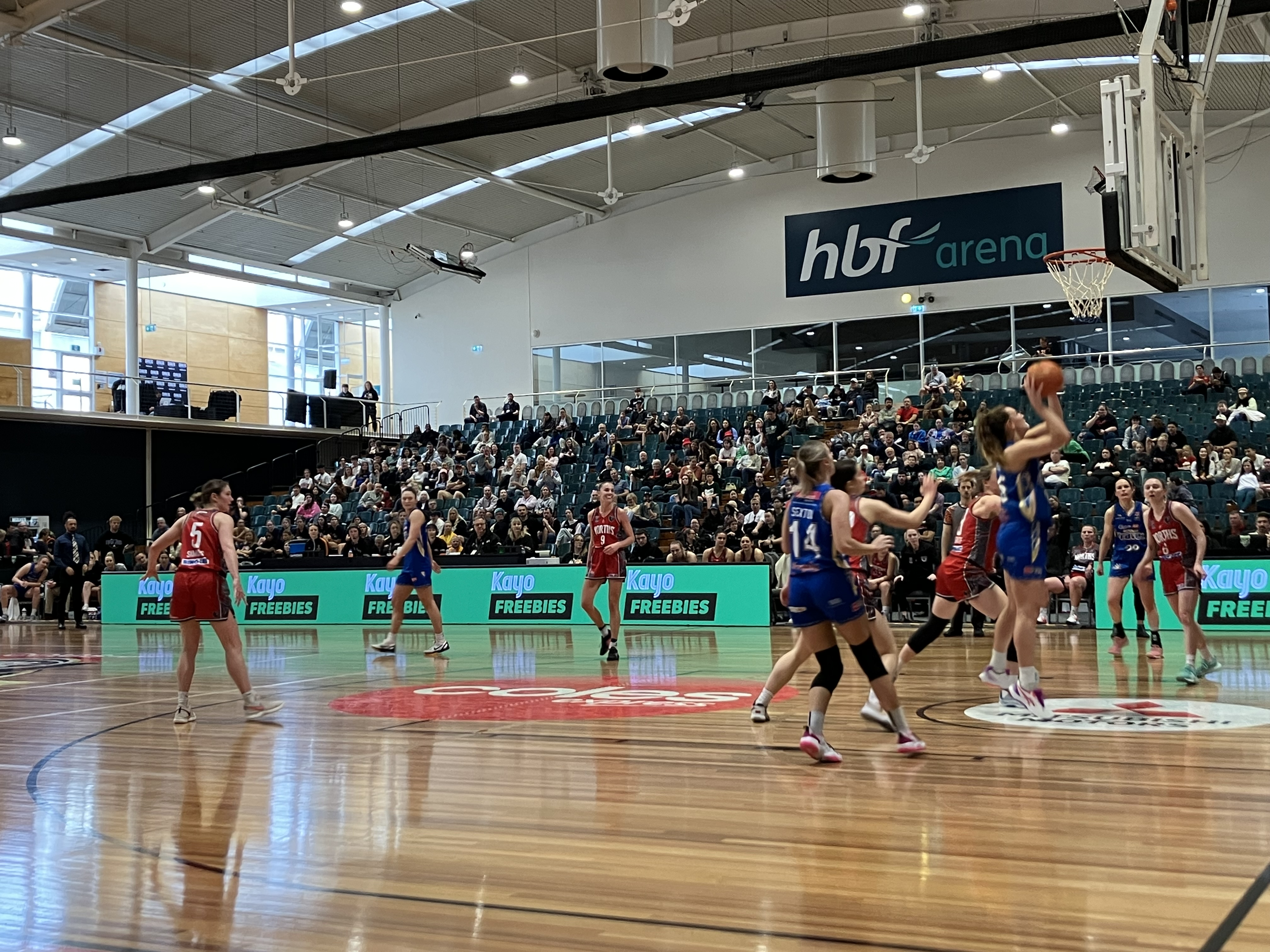
NBL1 Women's National Championship Game

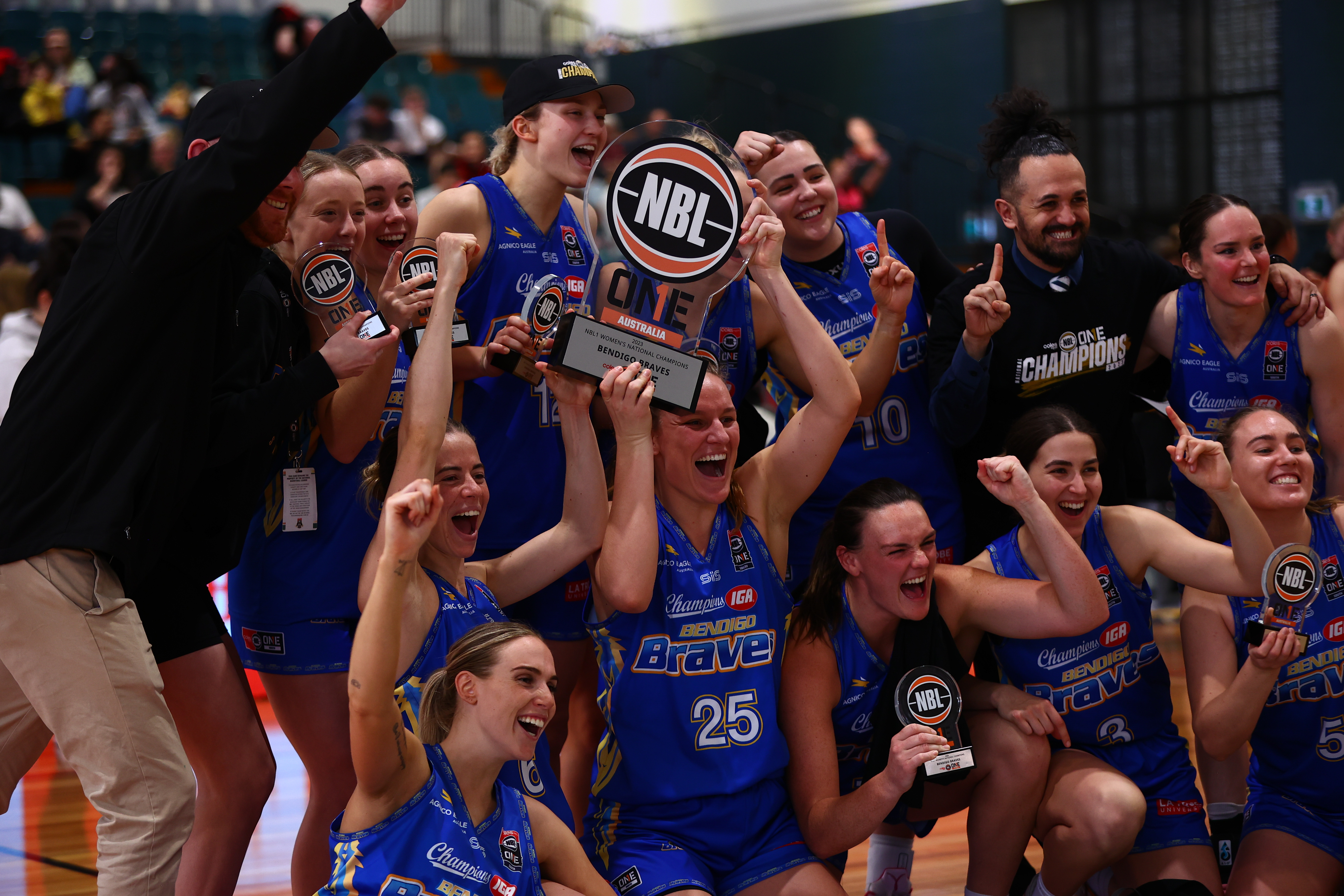
Bendigo Braves 2023 NBL1 National champions

===== Men =====
====== Rosters ======
Rockingham Flames – 1st
#	Player
Starters
1	Devondrick Walker
3	Ryan Godfrey (C)
6	Jeremy Combs
13	Tom Jervis
20	Marshall Nelson
Reserves
5	Jake Amos
7	Cody Hill
10	Justin Beard
12	Travis Durnin
14	Callum Beard
22	Rivar Evans
32	Apanyjwok Abuy
Pos	Coach
HC	Ryan Petrik
AC	Bradley New

Knox Raiders – 2nd
#	Player
Starters
2	Bailey Nunn
5	Madut Akec
10	Ke'Jhan Feagin (C)
15	Wayne Stewart Jr.
23	Austin Rapp
Reserves
8	Jacob Foy
21	Dylan Hare
Pos	Coach
HC	Matthew Nunn
AC	Brenton O'Brien

====== Game summary ======
Kayo Sports

20 August 2023
1:30 pm

Box score
Report
Highlights

Rockingham Flames 85, Knox Raiders 90
Scoring by quarter: 26–16, 19–33, 19–20, 21–21
Pts: Devondrick Walker 37; Rebs: Tom Jervis 12; Asts: Marshall Nelson 7	Pts: Ke'Jhan Feagin 27; Rebs: Austin Rapp 12; Asts: Ke'Jhan Feagin 9
Knox wins NBL1 National Championship

Showcourt 1, HBF Arena, Perth
MVP: Ke'Jhan Feagin (Raiders)

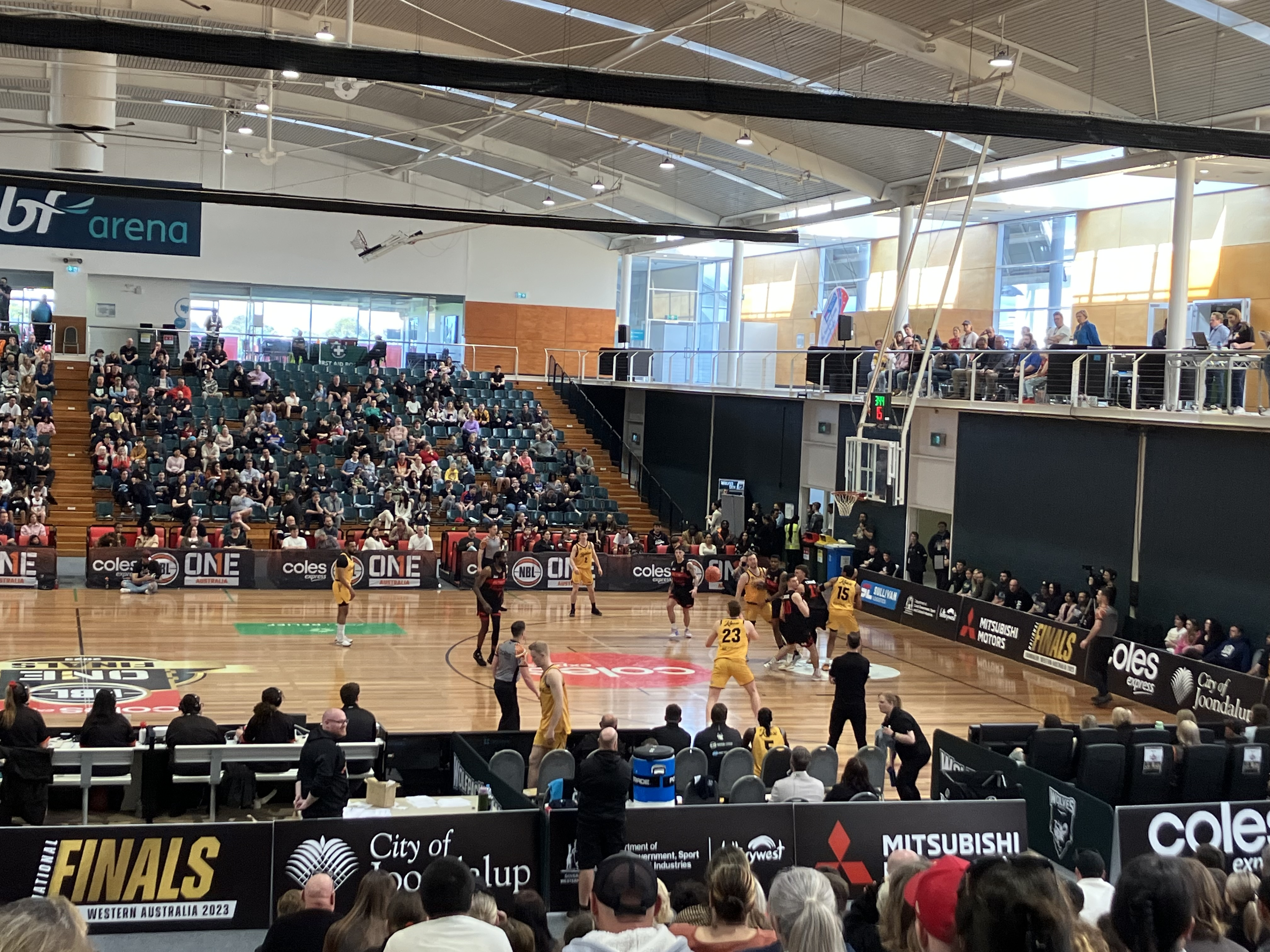
NBL1 Men's National Championship Game

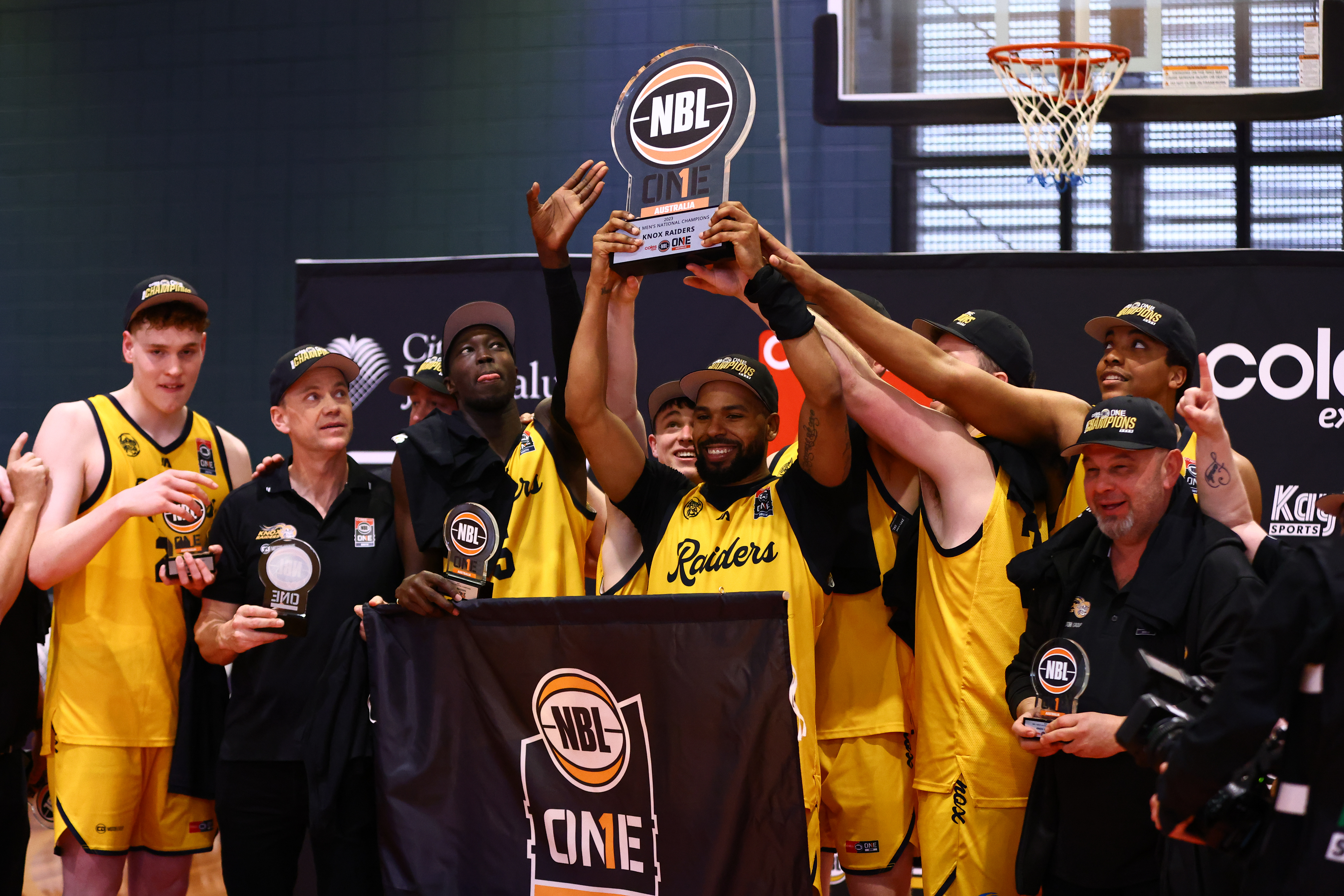
Knox Raiders 2023 NBL1 National champions

=== All-Star Five ===
==== Women ====
- Jolene Anderson (Norths Bears)
- Amy Atwell (Bendigo Braves)
- Megan McKay (Bendigo Braves)
- Karly Murphy (Warwick Senators)
- Ally Wilson (Norwood Flames)

==== Men ====
- Jeremy Combs (Rockingham Flames)
- Ke'Jhan Feagin (Knox Raiders)
- Johny Narkle (Geraldton Buccaneers)
- Marshall Nelson (Rockingham Flames)
- Wayne Stewart Jr. (Knox Raiders)
