= Janet Williams (basketball) =

Australian basketball player

Personal information
- Born: 15 September 1953 (age 72) Sydney, New South Wales
Medal record
Women's Basketball
Representing Australia

Janet Williams (born 15 September 1953) is a retired Australian women's basketball player.

== Biography ==
Williams played for the Australia women's national basketball team during the late 1970s and competed for Australia at the 1979 World Championship held in South Korea. Williams also played for the Opals in a 1978 basketball tour of Europe and China. At 5'8" tall, Williams played as a Shooting guard.

In the domestic Women's National Basketball League (WNBL), Williams played for the Sutherland Sharks (1981–85). In 1980, Williams stated that lack of finance was the single most important reason that Australia was not a force in international basketball.
