= 2026 NBL1 season =

- League: NBL1
- Sport: Basketball
- Duration: 21 March – 16 August (Conference seasons); 21–23 August (NBL1 National Finals)

National Finals
- Champions: M: Gold Coast Rollers; W: Knox Raiders
- Runners-up: M: Forestville Eagles; W: Bankstown Bruins
- Grand Final MVP: M: Ashley McGrath (Gold Coast Rollers); W: Alicia Froling (Knox Raiders)

NBL1 seasons
- ← 2025 2027 →

The 2026 NBL1 season was the seventh season of the NBL1. The season consisted of five conferences: South, North, Central, West and East.

The fifth annual National Finals was held in Adelaide, with the North's Gold Coast Rollers men and South's Knox Raiders women crowned the NBL1 National champions.

== Conference seasons ==
The season began on 21 March for the Central Conference, 26 March for the West Conference, 27 March for the South Conference, 28 March for the East Conference, and 17 April for the North Conference. All conference finals were concluded by 16 August.

=== South ===
The women's minor premiers were the Knox Raiders with an 18–4 record while the men's minor premiers were the Melbourne Tigers with a 17–5 record. Dallas Loughridge of the Casey Cavaliers was named women's MVP while Jacob Richards of the Hobart Chargers was named men's MVP.

On 17 July 2026, Kyle Adnam of the Sandringham Sabres scored 70 points in a 130–80 win over the Northern Force, breaking the all-time NBL1 scoring record.

A new top-ten finals format was introduced, taking place over four rounds across four weekends. The women's grand final saw the Knox Raiders defeat the Waverley Falcons 80–54 while the men's grand final saw the Frankston Blues defeat the Eltham Wildcats 78–75. Paige Bradley of the Knox Raiders was named women's grand final MVP while Jeremy Combs of the Frankston Blues was named men's grand final MVP.

=== North ===
The women's minor premiers were the Logan Thunder with a 14–2 record while the men's minor premiers were the Cairns Marlins with a 16–0 record. Courtney Woods of the Townsville Flames was named women's MVP while Kody Stattmann of the Cairns Marlins was named men's MVP.

The top-six finals took place over three rounds across three weekends. The women's grand final series saw the Mackay Meteorettes defeat the Townsville Flames 2–1, with the Meteorettes winning 107–78 in game one, the Flames winning 82–76 in game two, and the Meteorettes winning 120–87 in game three, while the men's grand final series saw the Gold Coast Rollers defeat the Ipswich Force 2–0, with 118–85 in game one and 120–116 in game two. Cheyenne Bobongie of the Mackay Meteorettes was named women's grand final MVP while Preston Le Gassick of the Gold Coast Rollers was named men's grand final MVP.

=== Central ===
The women's minor premiers were the West Adelaide Bearcats with a 17–1 record while the men's minor premiers were the Forestville Eagles with a 16–2 record. Cali Clark of the Norwood Flames was named women's MVP while Jeremy Smith of the South Adelaide Panthers was named men's MVP.

The top-five finals took place over four rounds across four weekends. The women's grand final saw the Sturt Sabres defeat the West Adelaide Bearcats 76–70 while the men's grand final saw the Forestville Eagles defeat the South Adelaide Panthers 77–58. Nicola Mathews of the Sturt Sabres was named women's grand final MVP while Alex Starling of the Forestville Eagles was named men's grand final MVP.

=== West ===
The women's minor premiers were the Cockburn Cougars with a 17–3 record while the men's minor premiers were the Geraldton Buccaneers with an 18–3 record. Jessie Edwards of the Cockburn Cougars was named women's MVP while Isaac White of the Rockingham Flames was named men's MVP.

The top-eight finals took place over four rounds across three weekends. The women's grand final saw the Warwick Senators defeat the Cockburn Cougars 102–76 while the men's grand final saw the Rockingham Flames defeat the Geraldton Buccaneers 66–62. Chloe Forster of the Warwick Senators was named women's grand final MVP while Isaac White of the Rockingham Flames was named men's grand final MVP.

=== East ===
The women's minor premiers were the Norths Bears with a 20–0 record while the men's minor premiers were the Illawarra Hawks with a 16–4 record. Jaz Shelley of the Norths Bears was named women's MVP while Todd Blanchfield of the Illawarra Hawks was named men's MVP.

The top-eight finals took place over four rounds across four weekends. The women's grand final saw the Bankstown Bruins defeat the Manly Warringah Sea Eagles 90–85 while the men's grand final saw the Norths Bears defeat the Sutherland Sharks 76–64. Shyla Heal of the Bankstown Bruins was named women's grand final MVP while Fabijan Krslovic of the Norths Bears was named men's grand final MVP.

=== Champions summary ===
==== Women ====
Conference	Champion	Result	Runner-up
South	Knox Raiders	80 – 54	Waverley Falcons
North	Mackay Meteorettes	2 – 1 (107–78, 76–82, 120–87)	Townsville Flames
Central	Sturt Sabres	76 – 70	West Adelaide Bearcats
West	Warwick Senators	102 – 76	Cockburn Cougars
East	Bankstown Bruins	90 – 85	Manly Warringah Sea Eagles

==== Men ====
Conference	Champion	Result	Runner-up
South	Frankston Blues	78 – 75	Eltham Wildcats
North	Gold Coast Rollers	2 – 0 (118–85, 120–116)	Ipswich Force
Central	Forestville Eagles	77 – 58	South Adelaide Panthers
West	Rockingham Flames	66 – 62	Geraldton Buccaneers
East	Norths Bears	76 – 64	Sutherland Sharks

== National Finals ==
The 2026 NBL1 National Finals took place at the State Basketball Centre in Adelaide, South Australia, from Friday 21 August to Sunday 23 August.

The 2025 defending champions, the Knox Raiders women and Canberra Gunners men, earned automatic qualification for the 2026 NBL1 National Finals. They were joined by the 2026 champions from each of the five conferences. With the Knox Raiders already guaranteed a place as defending champions, the Waverley Falcons, as the other South Conference women's grand finalist, also qualified for the National Finals.

Following the conclusion of the 10 Conference Grand Finals, the NBL1 confirmed the field and the seedings. In 2026, the NBL1 National Rankings were introduced, combining regular-season performance with conference weighting based on key measures of competition strength. The rankings were used to determine the seedings and first-round matchups for qualified teams at the National Finals.

Men's Field:

- NBL1 East Champions: Norths Bears (#1 seed)
- NBL1 Central Champions: Forestville Eagles (#2 seed)
- NBL1 West Champions: Rockingham Flames (#3 seed)
- NBL1 North Champions: Gold Coast Rollers (#4 seed)
- NBL1 South Champions: Frankston Blues (#5 seed)
- Reigning National Champions: Canberra Gunners (#6 seed)

Women's Field:

- Reigning National Champions / NBL1 South Champions: Knox Raiders (#1 seed)
- NBL1 East Champions: Bankstown Bruins (#2 seed)
- NBL1 South Runners Up: Waverley Falcons (#3 seed)
- NBL1 North Champions: Mackay Meteorettes (#4 seed)
- NBL1 West Champions: Warwick Senators (#5 seed)
- NBL1 Central Champions: Sturt Sabres (#6 seed)

The Friday games were for seeding, followed by semi-finals on Saturday and grand finals on Sunday. The day two fixture announcement saw two semi finals for both men and women, plus one consolation game in each.

In the Championship Games, the North's Gold Coast Rollers men and South's Knox Raiders women crowned the NBL1 National champions.

=== Day One – Friday ===
==== Women ====
- Seed #3 vs Seed #4

21 August 2026
4:30 pm

Box score
Report

Waverley Falcons 86, Mackay Meteorettes 72
Scoring by quarter: 27–19, 18–21, 15–18, 26–14
Pts: Katelyn Shumate 25; Rebs: Georgia Pineau 12; Asts: Millicent McCarthy 7	Pts: Chelsea Brook 30; Rebs: Chelsea Brook 11; Asts: Cheyenne Bobongie 8
After Day 1: Waverley 3rd, Mackay 4th

State Basketball Centre (Wayville)

- Seed #2 vs Seed #5

21 August 2026
6:00 pm

Box score
Report

Bankstown Bruins 72, Warwick Senators 50
Scoring by quarter: 21–16, 16–13, 22–10, 13–11
Pts: Shyla Heal 22; Rebs: Kiahna Davis-White 13; Asts: Shyla Heal 8	Pts: Kyana Weir 18; Rebs: Greta Kampschroeder 12; Asts: Weir, Miotti 2 each
After Day 1: Bankstown 2nd, Warwick 5th

State Basketball Centre (Wayville)

- Seed #1 vs Seed #6

21 August 2026
6:30 pm

Box score
Report

Knox Raiders 82, Sturt Sabres 55
Scoring by quarter: 22–18, 27–11, 14–13, 19–13
Pts: Paige Bradley 22; Rebs: Agnes Emma-Nnopu 14; Asts: Froling, Santomaggio 4 each	Pts: Paige Padroth 23; Rebs: Stamatelopoulos, Williamson 5 each Asts: Nicola Mathews 5
After Day 1: Knox 1st, Sturt 6th

State Basketball Centre (Wayville)

==== Men ====
- Seed #1 vs Seed #5

21 August 2026
4:00 pm

Box score
Report

Norths Bears 79, Frankston Blues 93
Scoring by quarter: 17–22, 19–24, 17–22, 26–25
Pts: Lewis Holey 17; Rebs: Ignatius Mitchell 8 Asts: Lachlan Bofinger 6	Pts: Jack Stanwix 24; Rebs: Jeremy Combs 13; Asts: Walker, Hastings 5 each
After Day 1: Norths 5th, Frankston 2nd

State Basketball Centre (Wayville)

- Seed #3 vs Seed #6

21 August 2026
8:00 pm

Box score
Report

Rockingham Flames 93, Canberra Gunners 110
Scoring by quarter: 20–30, 19–32, 27–21, 27–27
Pts: Blake Jones 45; Rebs: Blake Jones 15; Asts: Emmett Naar 11	Pts: William Mayfield 29; Rebs: Pender, Byatt 7 each Asts: Cameron Pender 8
After Day 1: Rockingham 6th, Canberra 1st

State Basketball Centre (Wayville)

- Seed #2 vs Seed #4

21 August 2026
8:30 pm

Box score
Report

Forestville Eagles 85, Gold Coast Rollers 84
Scoring by quarter: 25–22, 14–21, 21–22, 25–19
Pts: Greg Mays 26; Rebs: Alex Starling 13; Asts: Adam Doyle 8	Pts: Boston Mazlin 19; Rebs: Riley Oberman 10; Asts: Brodie McGregor 10
After Day 1: Forestville 3rd, Gold Coast 4th

State Basketball Centre (Wayville)

=== Day Two – Saturday ===
==== Women ====
- Consolation Game: 5th vs 6th

22 August 2026
2:00 pm

Box score
Report

Warwick Senators 74, Sturt Sabres 97
Scoring by quarter: 23–26, 10–25, 22–18, 19–28
Pts: Kyana Weir 25; Rebs: Mackenzie Clinch Hoycard 10; Asts: Mackenzie Clinch Hoycard 5	Pts: Paige Padroth 30; Rebs: Elizabeth Williamson 10; Asts: Nicola Mathews 7

State Basketball Centre (Wayville)

- Semi Final: 1st vs 4th

22 August 2026
2:30 pm

Box score
Report

Knox Raiders 100, Mackay Meteorettes 80
Scoring by quarter: 23–20, 21–22, 28–12, 28–26
Pts: Agnes Emma-Nnopu 28; Rebs: Agnes Emma-Nnopu 13; Asts: Paige Bradley 6	Pts: River Baldwin 27; Rebs: River Baldwin 13; Asts: Cheyenne Bobongie 10

State Basketball Centre (Wayville)

- Semi Final: 2nd vs 3rd

22 August 2026
4:00 pm

Box score
Report

Bankstown Bruins 89, Waverley Falcons 73
Scoring by quarter: 30–23, 27–18, 20–12, 12–20
Pts: Kiahna Davis-White 22; Rebs: Davida Dale 9 Asts: Shyla Heal 11	Pts: Katelyn Shumate 20; Rebs: Shumate, Kinkela 7 each Asts: Amelia Todhunter 6

State Basketball Centre (Wayville)

==== Men ====
- Semi Final: 2nd vs 3rd

22 August 2026
4:30 pm

Box score
Report

Frankston Blues 75, Forestville Eagles 80
Scoring by quarter: 24–17, 6–22, 16–16, 29–25
Pts: Jeremy Combs 27; Rebs: Jeremy Combs 11; Asts: Lucas Barker 10	Pts: Daniel Johnson 20; Rebs: Daniel Johnson 10; Asts: Adam Doyle 5

State Basketball Centre (Wayville)

- Consolation Game: 5th vs 6th

22 August 2026
6:00 pm

Box score
Report

Norths Bears 96, Rockingham Flames 84
Scoring by quarter: 27–20, 21–17, 27–24, 21–23
Pts: Lachlan Bofinger 23; Rebs: Lewis Holey 10; Asts: Matthew Wacher 7	Pts: Blake Jones 27; Rebs: Travis Durnin 8 Asts: Emmett Naar 14

State Basketball Centre (Wayville)

- Semi Final: 1st vs 4th

22 August 2026
6:30 pm

Box score
Report

Canberra Gunners 90, Gold Coast Rollers 98
Scoring by quarter: 18–30, 18–20, 26–19, 28–29
Pts: Hoskins, Rice 15 each Rebs: Cameron Pender 17; Asts: William Mayfield 7	Pts: Boston Mazlin 29; Rebs: Brodie McGregor 18; Asts: Brodie McGregor 4

State Basketball Centre (Wayville)

=== Day Three – Sunday ===
==== Championship Games ====
===== Women =====
====== Rosters ======
Knox Raiders
#	Player
Starters
1	Agnes Emma-Nnopu
2	Paige Burrows
9	Alicia Froling
11	Leah Santomaggio
22	Paige Bradley (C)
Reserves
3	Rachel Bell
6	Rachael Quirk
8	Tahlee Farrell
25	Erica Cid
33	Haliegh Reinoehl
Pos	Coach
HC	Craig Simpson
AC	Brad Farrell
AC	Kaleb Foster

Bankstown Bruins
#	Player
Starters
2	Davida Dale
4	Kiahna Davis-White (C)
8	Tahlia Tupaea (C)
11	Shyla Heal
45	Margot De Freitas
Reserves
5	Shalome Dunlop
6	Kaila Proctor
9	Sienna Allie
13	Tara Kalivitis
18	Jane Dunlop
24	Jennifer Tachejian
Pos	Coach
HC	Lauryn Curtin
AC	Kristin Baldacchino
AC	Reuben Challis

====== Game summary ======
Kayo Sports

23 August 2026
11:00 am

Box score
Report
Highlights

Knox Raiders 86, Bankstown Bruins 73
Scoring by quarter: 26–27, 16–14, 21–23, 23–9
Pts: Alicia Froling 24; Rebs: Agnes Emma-Nnopu 12; Asts: Paige Bradley 8	Pts: Shyla Heal 30; Rebs: De Freitas, Proctor 7 each Asts: Shyla Heal 7
Knox wins NBL1 National Championship

State Basketball Centre (Wayville)
MVP: Alicia Froling (Raiders)

===== Men =====
====== Rosters ======
Forestville Eagles
#	Player
Starters
15	Greg Mays
19	Adam Doyle (C)
21	Daniel Johnson
25	Fiston Ipassou
32	Alex Starling
Reserves
5	Jordan Wilson
7	Isaac Jurecky
8	Boh Wilcox
11	Tom Vears
13	James Mackenzie
52	Ryan Girardi
80	Stefan Gould
Pos	Coach
HC	Andrew Simons
AC	Jason Dix
AC	Todd Grocke

Gold Coast Rollers
#	Player
Starters
2	Brodie McGregor
6	Boston Mazlin
7	Cooper Urquhart
8	Ashley McGrath
33	Tidjane Diop (C)
Reserves
1	Matthew Mckewin
55	Riley Oberman
Pos	Coach
HC	Anthony Petrie
AC	Pero Cameron
AC	Scott McGregor

====== Game summary ======
Kayo Sports

23 August 2026
1:30 pm

Box score
Report
Highlights

Forestville Eagles 67, Gold Coast Rollers 70 (OT)
Scoring by quarter: 17–18, 22–21, 14–10, 10–14, Overtime: 4–7
Pts: Greg Mays 21; Rebs: Mays, Johnson 12 each Asts: Daniel Johnson 4	Pts: Ashley McGrath 21; Rebs: Brodie McGregor 11; Asts: Boston Mazlin 7
Gold Coast wins NBL1 National Championship

State Basketball Centre (Wayville)
MVP: Ashley McGrath (Rollers)

=== All-Star Five ===
==== Women ====
- Paige Bradley (Knox Raiders)
- Agnes Emma-Nnopu (Knox Raiders)
- Shyla Heal (Bankstown Bruins)
- Haliegh Reinoehl (Knox Raiders)
- Katelyn Shumate (Waverley Falcons)

==== Men ====
- Jeremy Combs (Frankston Blues)
- Daniel Johnson (Forestville Eagles)
- Blake Jones (Rockingham Flames)
- William Mayfield (Canberra Gunners)
- Boston Mazlin (Gold Coast Rollers)
