= Sutherland Sharks (basketball) =

- Leagues: NBL1 East
- Location: Sutherland, Australia
- Team colors: black, blue
- Championships: NBL1 East Men: 4 (2006, 2007, 2008, 2023); NBL1 East Women: 3 (1993, 1995, 2021)
- Website: sutherlandbasketball.com.au

Sutherland Sharks is an Australian basketball club based in Sutherland, Australia. The Sharks play in the NBL1 East conference within the Australian NBL1. The Sutherland Sharks sponsor both a men's and women's team.

== History ==
The Sharks have won four titles in the men's NBL1 East (previously known as the Waratah League) in 2006, 2007, 2008, and 2023. In the women's NBL1 East, the Sharks have three championships in 1993, 1995, and 2021.

In October 2021, the Sharks were unveiled as one of the inaugural 12 teams competing in the NBL1 East league.

On August 12, 2023, the Sharks men's club won the 2023 NBL1 East championship in front of a sold-out crowd at the Sydney Uni Sports & Aquatic Centre in Sydney, Australia. Sutherland would proceed to the 2023 NBL1 National finals where it would represent the East Conference and finish in 4th place in the tournament.

== Current Rosters ==
=== Men's ===
2024-25 Sutherland Sharks roster
Players
Coaches

| Pos. | No. | Nat. | Name | Ht. |
|---|---|---|---|---|
| G/F | 1 | (Australia) | Cabrera, Adrian |
| F/C | 74 | (Australia) | Gerlach, Geoffrey |
| G | 2 | (Australia) | Hutchison, Lochlan (C) |
| F | 22 | (Australia) | Jamieson, Luke |
| G/F | 5 | (Australia) | Lake, Angus | 2.02 m (6 ft 8 in) |
| G | 7 | (Australia) | Macarthur, Bailey | 1.94 m (6 ft 4 in) |
| F | 65 | (Australia) | Mulholland, Ryan |
| G/F | 12 | (Australia) | Noi, Kouat |
| G | 50 | (Australia) | Paravinja, Jovan |
| G | 11 | (Australia) | Raynor, Harrison |
| G | 65 | (Australia) | Spark, Joshua |
| C | 14 | (Australia) | Spurgin, Jason |
| G | 3 | (Australia) | Waban, Aaron |
| F | 98 | (New Zealand) | Woodbridge, Connor |

Head coach

- (Australia) Shaun Roger

Assistant coach(es)

- (Australia) Angus Bourke

Legend

- (C) Team captain
- (DP) Development player
- (I) Import player
- Injured

- Roster
Updated: 19 Apr 2025

=== Women's ===
2024-25 Sutherland Sharks roster
Players
Coaches

| Pos. | No. | Nat. | Name | Ht. |
|---|---|---|---|---|
| G/F | 6 | (Australia) | Andriejunas, Melinda | 1.76 m (5 ft 9 in) |
| C | 22 | (Australia) | Bruce, Mia |
| G | 2 | (Australia) | Dewhurst, Jordyn |
| G | 23 | (Australia) | Fabbro, Aliza |
| G/F | 21 | (Australia) | Garland, Emily |
| F | 3 | (United States) | Hawthorne, Laci (I) |
| G | 4 | (Australia) | Kerry, Madison | 1.77 m (5 ft 10 in) |
| F | 30 | (Australia) | Norris, Madeleine |
| G | 50 | (Australia) | Panousis, Vanessa |
| G | 11 | (Cook Islands) | Pilitati, Dalen | 1.66 m (5 ft 5 in) |
| G | 14 | (Australia) | Waller, Aislinn | 1.77 m (5 ft 10 in) |
| C | 13 | (Australia) | White, Olivia (C) |

Head coach

- (Australia) Jared Wilson

Assistant coach(es)

- (Australia) Emma Palmer
- (Australia) Grace Nicholson

Legend

- (C) Team captain
- (DP) Development player
- (I) Import player
- Injured

- Roster
Updated: 19 Apr 2025

== Notable players ==
- (Australia) Janet Williams
- (United States) Chelsie Schweers
- (Australia) Brandon Bates
- (Australia) Shyla Heal
- (Australia) Wendy Laidlaw
- (Australia) Kelly Wilson
- (Australia) Dominic Gilbert

== Notable personnel ==
- (Australia) Shane Heal (coach)
