= Newcastle Falcons (NBL1 East) =

- Leagues: NBL1 East
- Founded: 1983
- History: Newcastle Hunters; 1983–2021; Newcastle Falcons; 2022–present
- Arena: Newcastle Basketball Stadium
- Capacity: 2,200
- Location: Newcastle, New South Wales
- Team colors: Red, navy blue, white
- President: Jaclyn Mottram
- General manager: Sara Jiear
- Head coach: M: Josh Morgan; W: Bernadette Schmidt
- Ownership: Newcastle Basketball
- Championships: Men: ABA (1): 1986; Waratah League (2): 2000; 2018; Women: Waratah League / NBL1 East (4): 2016; 2019; 2021; 2024
- Conference titles: Men: SEABL (1): 1986
- Website: NBL1.com.au

Newcastle Falcons is a NBL1 East club based in Newcastle, New South Wales. The club fields a team in both the Men's and Women's NBL1 East. The club is a division of Newcastle Basketball, the major administrative basketball organisation in the region. The Falcons play their home games at Newcastle Basketball Stadium.

== Club history ==
Newcastle Basketball was formed in 1946. Games were played in two makeshift stadiums, one being an old aircraft hangar at Tighes Hill, before a purpose built basketball stadium was erected in Wickham. The move to Newcastle Basketball Stadium (Broadmeadow) was made in 1969.

In 1983, Newcastle Basketball began fielding a men's team in the South East Australian Basketball League (SEABL). The Newcastle Hunters were SEABL South champions and ABA National champions in 1986. They were ABA runners-up in 1987.

In 1990, Newcastle Basketball entered a team in the inaugural SEABL women's competition. The women's team was originally known as the Newcastle Scorpions. Both the men's team and women's team left the SEABL following the 1998 season.

In 2000, the Hunters men won the Basketball NSW Premier League. The following year, the Premier Division was renamed the Waratah League, with the league joining the Australian Basketball Association (ABA). The Hunters men were Waratah League runners-up in 2004, 2005, 2008 and 2011.

In 2016, the Hunters women were crowned Waratah League champions for the first time. In 2018, the men won their first championship since 2000. In 2019, the women won their second championship in four seasons. The 2021 women's championship was shared by the Hunters and the Sutherland Sharks after the season was cut short in August due to lockdowns as a result of the COVID-19 pandemic.

In late 2021, following the club's admission to the new NBL1 East competition replacing the Waratah League, Newcastle Basketball surveyed the local community to gauge support for a potential rebranding of the club. The club was subsequently renamed the Newcastle Falcons (after the defunct national league NBL franchise of the same name) after 51% of the survey's respondents voted for the change of name.

In 2024, the Falcons women reached the NBL1 East Grand Final, where they defeated the Sutherland Sharks 85–78 to win the NBL1 East championship led by league MVP Nicole Munger.
