= Hills Hornets =

- Leagues: NBL1 East
- Founded: 1984
- Arena: Hills Sports Stadium
- Location: Castle Hill, Sydney, New South Wales
- Team colors: Green, White & Red
- Website: NBL1.com.au

Hills Hornets is a NBL1 East club based in Sydney, New South Wales. The club fields a team in both the Men's and Women's NBL1 East. The club is a division of Hills Basketball Association (HBA), the major administrative basketball organisation in the Hills District of Sydney. The Hornets play their home games at Hills Basketball Stadium.

== Club history ==
=== Background ===
The Hills Basketball Association was established in 1984 and became incorporated in 1989. In 1995, the association built the Hills Basketball Stadium where the association operates from and acts as the home venue for Hornets games.

=== Representative Competitions ===
The Hills Hornets compete in the various men's and women's competitions operated by Basketball New South Wales including the top-tier NBL1 East, formerly known as the Waratah League. The Hornets were runners-up in 2003's Waratah League Men's tournament as well as runners-up in the 1997 & 1998 Premier Division women's tournaments.

The Hornets were also repeat champions of the Women's National Wheelchair Basketball League from 2003 to 2009.

=== Venue ===
The Hornets and most recreational competitions operated by the association, play games at the Hills Basketball Stadium. The stadium is located in the Fred Caterson Reserve in Castle Hill, New South Wales. The stadium was built in 1995 by the association and featured 4 full sized indoor courts, cafe, player/official facilities and the offices of the association. In 2018, the stadium expanded to add new facilities and an additional two courts.

== Notable players ==
A number of former Hornets representative players have gone on to play professionally in Australia and overseas:

- AJ Ogilvy, a former Hornet who last played with the Illawarra Hawks of the National Basketball League (NBL) before retiring.
- Julian Kazzouh, a Hornets junior product who played professionally, last with the Sydney Kings of the NBL. An injury ended his last active season prematurely.
- Josh Green, who currently plays for the Charlotte Hornets of the NBA. Green played for the Hornets at a young age before joining Penrith Panthers Basketball. He was considered an NBA prospect while playing college basketball for Arizona.
