= Basketball Illawarra =

Illawarra Hawks
- Leagues: NBL1 East
- Founded: 1954
- Arena: Snakepit Stadium
- Capacity: 1,500
- Location: Wollongong, New South Wales
- Team colors: Red, Black & White
- President: Graham Richardson
- Vice-president: Glen Stutchbury
- General manager: Nathan Loveday
- Ownership: Illawarra Basketball Association Ltd.
- Affiliation: Illawarra Hawks (NBL)
- Championships: NBL1 East mens’s: 4 (1998, 1999, 2001, 2011); NBL1 East women’s: 1 (2013)
- Website: NBL1.com.au

Basketball Illawarra is the governing body of basketball in the Illawarra region of New South Wales, Australia and is based in the city of Wollongong. The club fields both men's and women's teams in state representative conceptions including the semi-professional basketball competition the NBL1 East who compete as the 'Illawarra Hawks'.

== Club history ==
=== Background ===
The Illawarra Basketball Association was established in 1954 as a local basketball competition among seven teams who registered to play. Their first venue was the Unanderra Hostel before moving to their current home in 1965, Snakepit Stadium. In 1979, Basketball Illawarra entered into the newly formed National Basketball League for its inaugural season that year. Since then, the NBL side has become largely independent of the Illawarra Basketball Association with separate ownership.

=== Representative Competitions ===
Basketball Illawarra's senior men's and women's representative teams compete in the NBL1 East, formerly known as the Waratah League. Playing as the 'Illawarra Hawks', they were champions of the men's state premier division championship in 1998 and 1999 prior to the formation of the Waratah League. The Hawks men's side were champions of the inaugural Waratah League in 2001 and again in 2011.

The women's side were runners-up in the 2003 Waratah League season.

=== Venue ===
The Hawks, and recreational competitions operated by the association, play games at Snakepit Stadium. The stadium opened in 1965 and is located in the Illawarra suburb of Gwynneville, New South Wales. The stadium previously hosted home games for the professional NBL side of the same name until their move to WIN Entertainment Centre. The NBL side's front office is still based at the stadium and the team use it as a training facility.
