= BA Centre of Excellence =

- Leagues: NBL1 East
- Founded: 1981
- History: Men: Australian Institute of Sport; 1982–2010; BA Centre of Excellence; 2014–present Women: BA Centre of Excellence; 2014–present
- Arena: AIS Basketball and Netball Centre
- Location: Canberra, Australian Capital Territory
- Team colors: Yellow and green
- General manager: Peter Lonergan
- Head coach: M: Michael Czepil; W: Melissa Downer
- Ownership: Basketball Australia
- Championships: Men: Waratah League (1): 2021
- Conference titles: Men: SEABL (1): 2002
- Website: NBL1.com.au

The Basketball Australia Centre of Excellence (BA CoE) is a high-performance training program run by Basketball Australia and based at the Australian Institute of Sport (AIS) in Canberra. The program's purpose is to development future Australian national team players for the Boomers and Opals.

The Centre of Excellence NBL1 club fields a team in both the Men's and Women's NBL1 East and play their home games at the AIS Basketball and Netball Centre.

== History ==
=== AIS men's team in the SEABL (1982–2010) ===
The BA Centre of Excellence originated in 1981 with the formation of the Australian Institute of Sport (AIS). While the AIS women's team entered the Women's National Basketball League (WNBL) for the league's inaugural 1981 season, the AIS men's team debuted in the South East Australian Basketball League (SEABL) in the league's second season in 1982.

The men's team was coached by Patrick Hunt from 1982 to 1992, then Gordie McLeod (1993–97), Frank Arsego (1998–2002), and Marty Clarke (2003–10). While the program saw little success in the SEABL, making the playoffs just six times, a highlight came in 2002 when the AIS won the East Conference championship behind coach Arsego and future NBA player Andrew Bogut. They went on to reach the Australian Basketball Association (ABA) National Final, where they lost 98–93 to the Hobart Chargers.

Following the 2010 season, the program had a change of direction and withdrew from the SEABL.

=== BA Centre of Excellence (2014–present) ===
In 2014, the Basketball Australia Centre of Excellence was established after Basketball Australia assumed responsibility of the AIS basketball program. The CoE men's team subsequently re-entered the SEABL. Following the withdrawal of the AIS women's team from the WNBL in 2012, a CoE women's team was established and debuted in the SEABL in 2014. Both CoE teams were ineligible for the SEABL playoffs from 2014 to 2017, as they did not compete in full seasons. After transitioning to full-season participation in 2018, the club became eligible for the playoffs for the first time.

Following the demise of the SEABL, the club joined the NBL1 for the league's inaugural season in 2019.

In 2020, the club joined the Waratah League. In 2021, the men's team were crowned co-champions of the COVID-affected Waratah League.

In 2022, the club re-entered the NBL1. The 2022 season saw both teams play in the Wildcard conference against the top teams from all five NBL1 State Conferences. For the 2023 NBL1 season, the CoE joined the NBL1 East.

In the 2025 NBL1 season, the women's team reach the NBL1 East Grand Final, where they lost 89–61 to the Manly Warringah Sea Eagles.

== NBA Global Academy ==
In June 2017, the NBA Global Academy was established as a joint initiative between the National Basketball Association (NBA) and Basketball Australia. Based at the Centre of Excellence in Canberra, it was created to as the NBA's global training hub for elite male and female basketball prospects from outside the United States. In November 2024, it was announced that Australia's Global Academy would close in July 2025.

The Global Academy represented the AIS and CoE at the annual NBA Academy Games in the United States.

== Gallery ==
AIS Basketball and Netball Centre, home of the BA Centre of Excellence

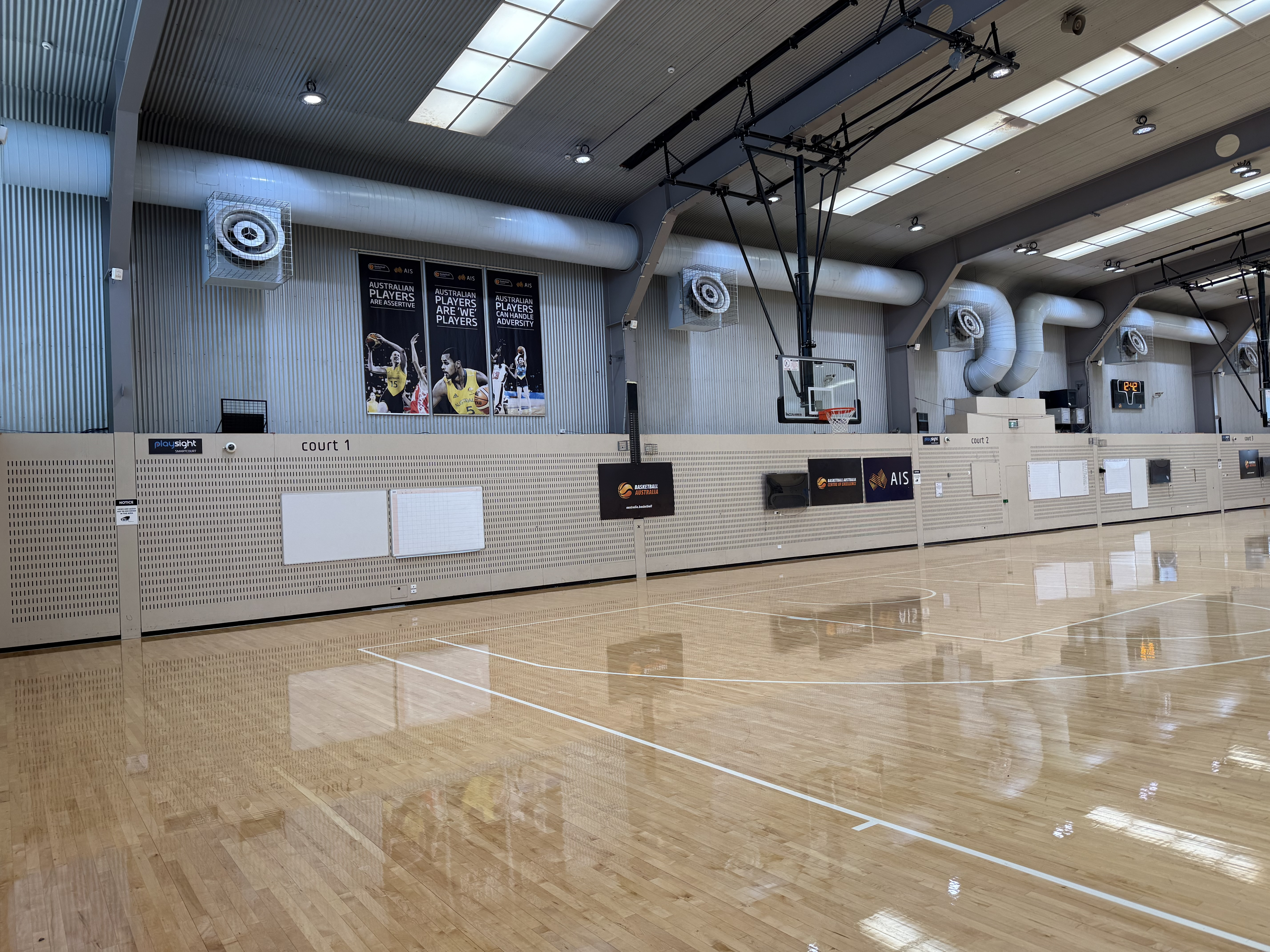
Home court for NBL1 games

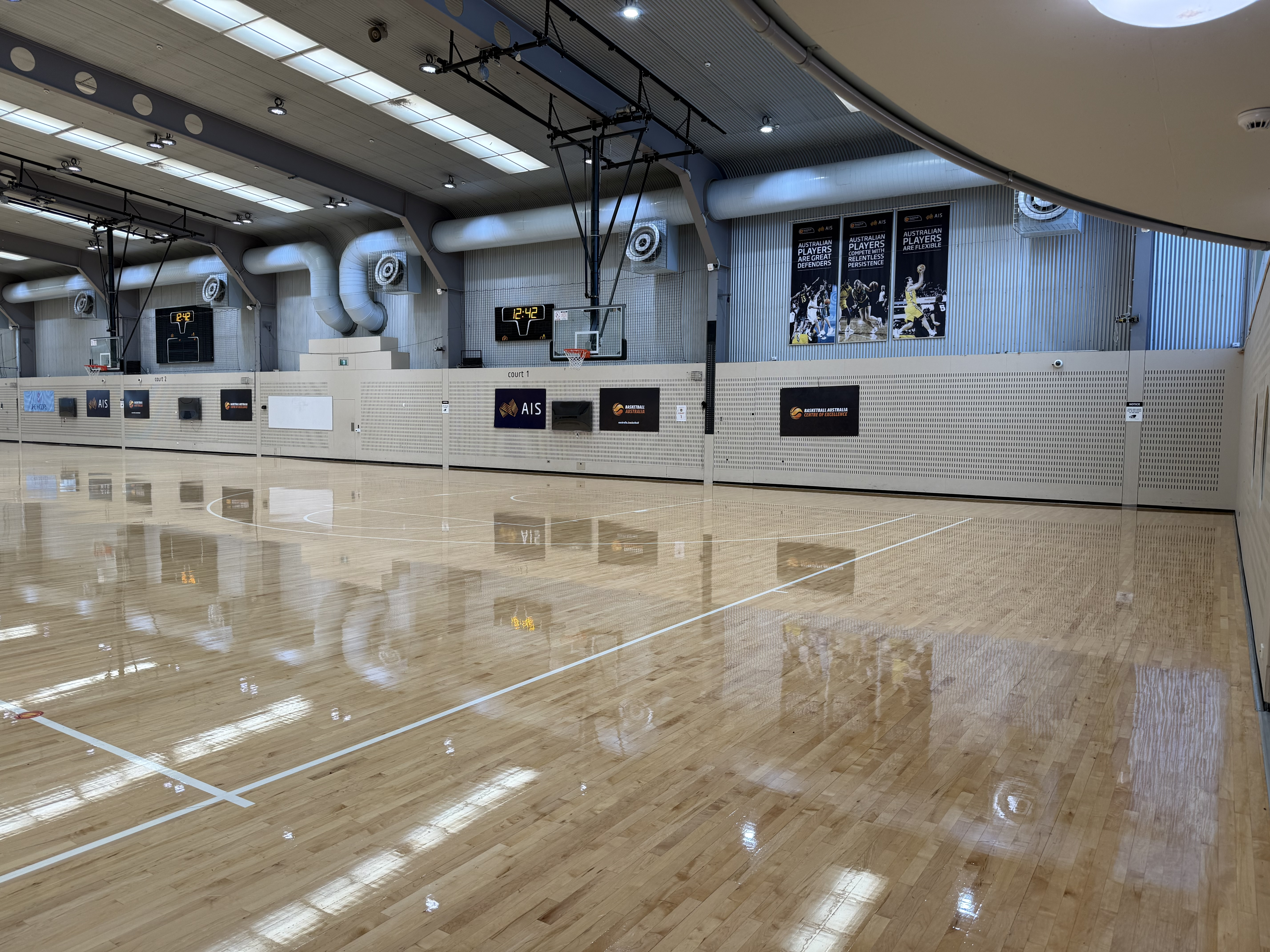
Home court for NBL1 games

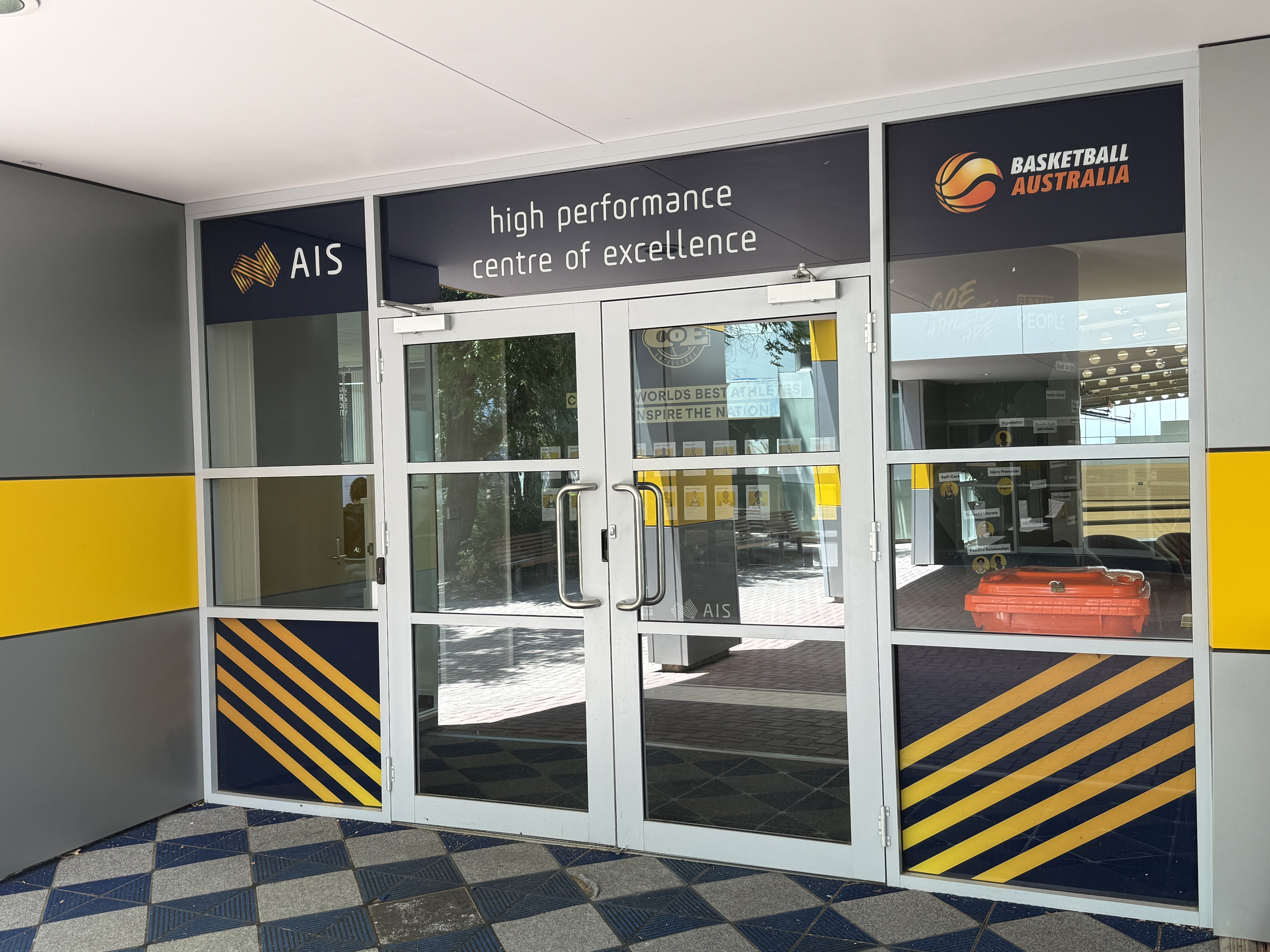
Office entry

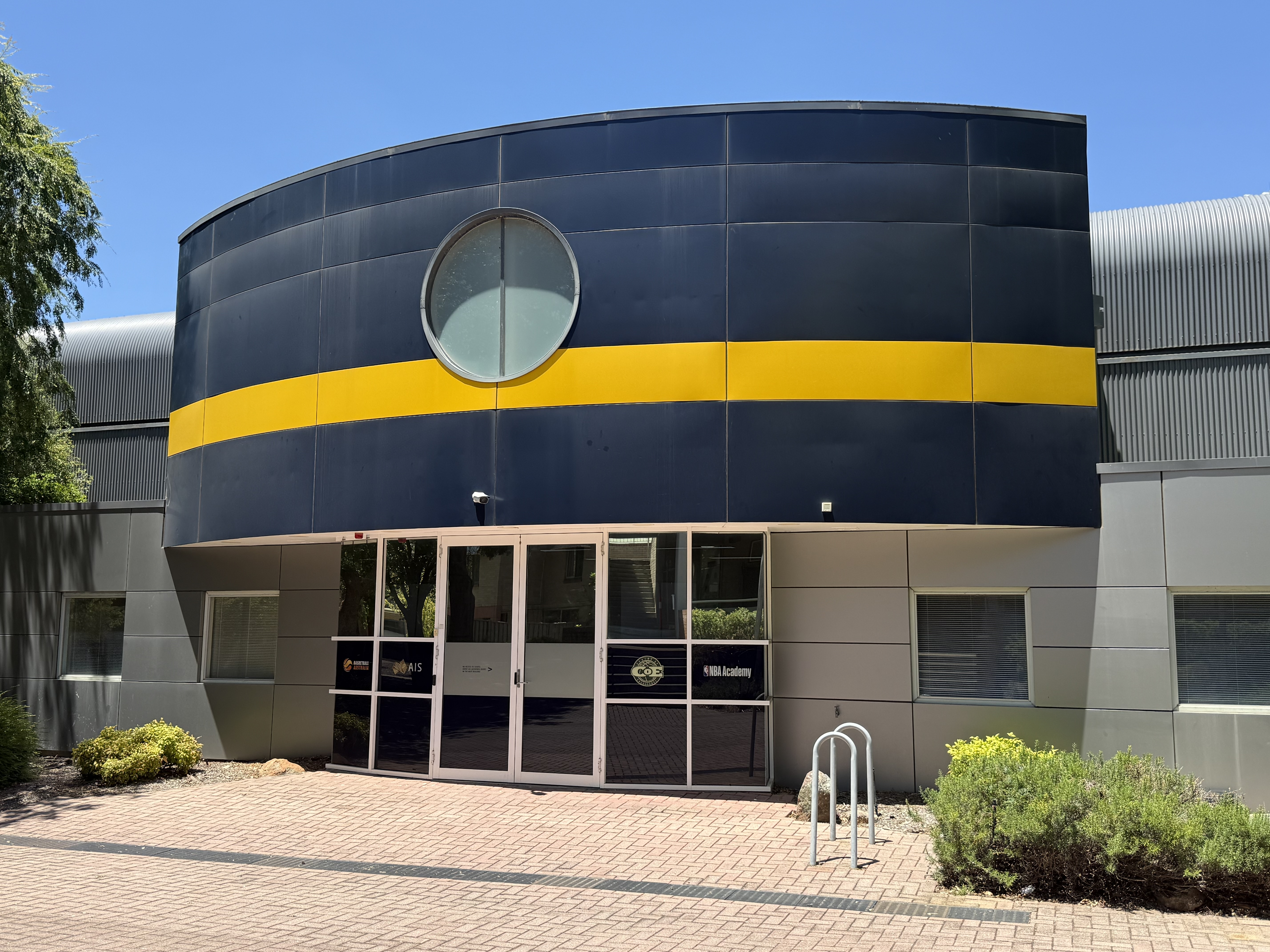
Office entry
