= Manly Warringah Sea Eagles (basketball) =

- Leagues: NBL1 East
- Location: Narrabeen, Australia
- Team colors: maroon, white
- Championships: NBL1 East Men: 4 (2010, 2013, 2020, 2021); NBL1 East Women: 3 (1991, 1992, 2017,2025)

Manly Warringah Sea Eagles is an Australian basketball club based in Narrabeen, Australia. The Sea Eagles play in the NBL1 East conference within the Australian NBL1. The men's team is coached by Tim Hill.

== History ==
The Sea Eagles men's team were NBL1 East (previously the Waratah League) champions in 2010, 2013, 2020, and 2021.

The Sea Eagles women's team were champions in 1991, 1992, and 2017.
