= Norths Bears =

- Leagues: NBL1 East
- Founded: 1991
- History: Norths Bears; 1991–present
- Arena: North Sydney Indoor Sports Centre
- Location: Crows Nest, New South Wales
- Team colors: Red and white
- CEO: Eric Stephens
- President: Vik Kortian
- Vice-president: Craig Kesby
- Championships: 4 (2012, 2014, 2017, 2026) (M); 3 (2018, 2020, 2023) (W)
- Website: NBL1.com.au

Norths Bears is a NBL1 East club based in Sydney, New South Wales. The club fields a team in both the Men's and Women's NBL1 East. The club is a division of Northern Suburbs Basketball Association (NSBA), the major administrative basketball organisation in North Sydney. The Bears play their home games at North Sydney Indoor Sports Centre.

== Club history ==
Northern Suburbs Basketball Association (NSBA) was founded in the early 1980s. The association's representative teams, the Norths Bears, competed in the New South Wales Premier Division, which began in 1991. The women's team were runners-up in 2000, and with the rebrand to Waratah League in 2001, the team went on to claim three straight runners-up finishes with Waratah League grand final appearances in 2001 and 2002. The men's team also had back-to-back grand final appearances in 2001 and 2002 under coach Rob Beveridge.

In 2012, the men's team won their first Waratah League championship. They went on to claim titles in 2014 and 2017. The women's team finished runners-up in 2017. In 2018, the men's team finished runners-up while the women's team claimed their first championship. The women's team won their second championship in 2020.

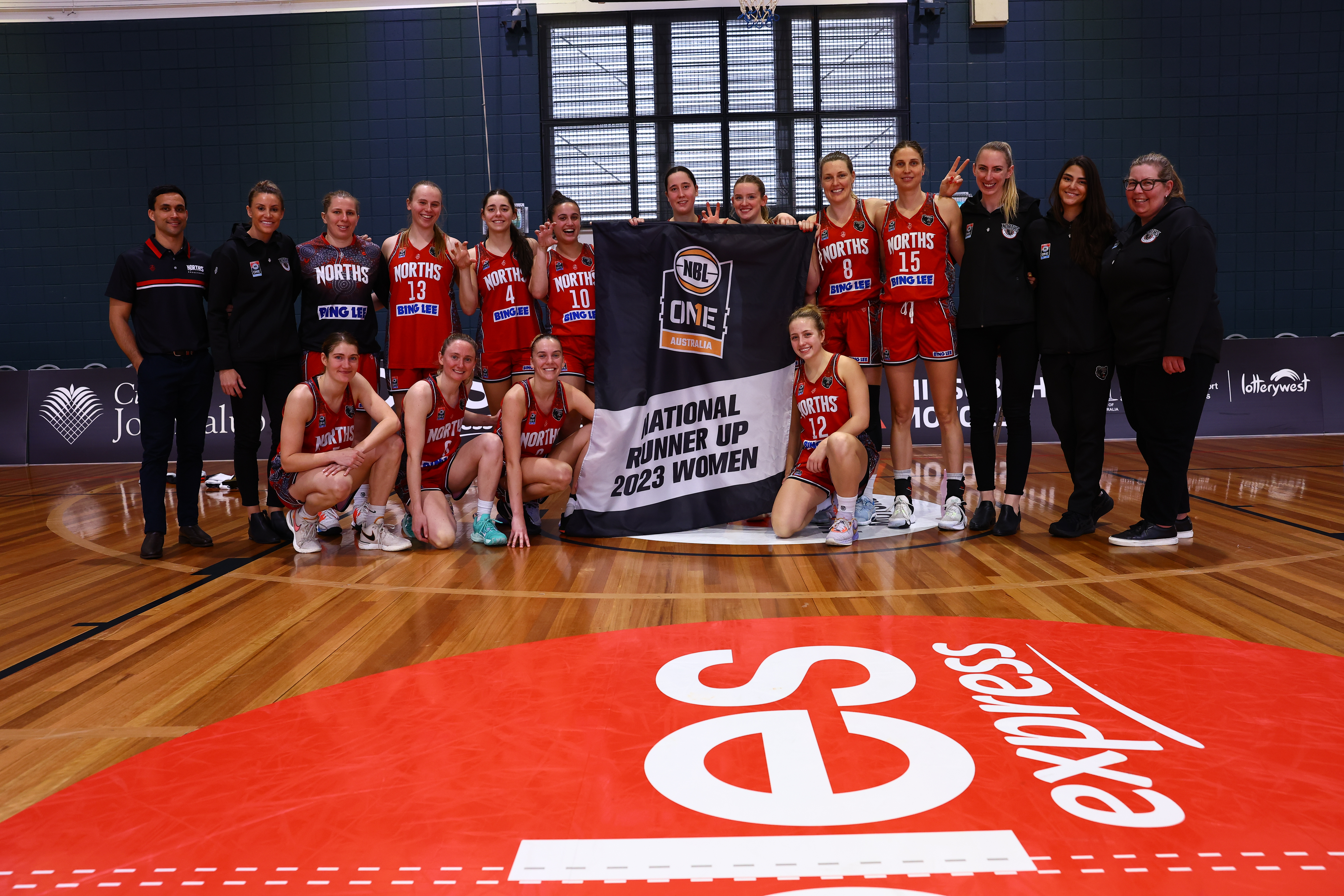
Norths Bears 2023 NBL1 National runners-up

The Waratah League rebranded to NBL1 East in 2022, with the Bears women going on to win the 2023 NBL1 East championship. The team went on to reach the championship game of the 2023 NBL1 National Finals, where they lost to the Bendigo Braves.

In the 2026 NBL1 East season, the Bears women finished the regular season with a 20–0 record. They went on to lose in the preliminary final. Meanwhile, the Bears men reached the 2026 NBL1 East Grand Final, where they won their fourth championship with a 76–64 victory over the Sutherland Sharks.
