= NBL1 East =

Semi-professional basketball league

- Current season, competition or edition: 2026 NBL1 season
- Formerly: Premier Division; 1991–2000; Waratah League; 2001–2021
- Sport: Basketball
- Founded: 1991
- First season: 1991
- No. of teams: M: 15; W: 15
- Country: Australia
- Continent: FIBA Oceania (Oceania)
- Most recent champions: M: Norths Bears (4th title); W: Bankstown Bruins (11th title)
- Most titles: M: Sydney Comets (5 titles); W: Bankstown Bruins (11 titles)
- Website: NBL1.com.au/East

NBL1 East, formerly the Waratah League, is a semi-professional basketball league in New South Wales and the Australian Capital Territory, comprising both a men's and women's competition. In 2021, Basketball New South Wales partnered with the National Basketball League (NBL) to bring NBL1 to New South Wales in 2022. NBL1 replaced the former Waratah League to create more professional pathways and opportunities for men and women playing basketball in New South Wales. As a result, the Waratah League became the east conference of NBL1. The league was previously a member of the Australian Basketball Association (ABA) from 2001 to 2008.

== History ==
In 1991, the New South Wales Premier Division was established. In 2001, the league was rebranded as Waratah League when it entered the Australian Basketball Association (ABA). The ABA was abandoned following the 2008 season, resulting in the Waratah League becoming an independent league again.

In 2021, Basketball New South Wales and the National Basketball League (NBL) announced a new partnership to bring NBL1 to New South Wales in 2022, with NBL1 replacing the Waratah League. The Waratah League was officially renamed NBL1 East and became the east conference of NBL1.

Twelve clubs took part in the NBL1 East's inaugural season in 2022. The competition grew to 16 teams in 2023 with the addition of four new clubs.

== Current clubs ==
Colours	Club	City	State	Arena	Joined NBL1 East
	Albury Wodonga Bandits	Albury	New South Wales	Lauren Jackson Sports Centre	2022
	BA Centre of Excellence	Canberra	Australian Capital Territory	Australian Institute of Sport	2023
	Bankstown Bruins	Sydney	New South Wales	Bankstown Basketball Stadium	2022
	Canberra Basketball (Gunners Men & Nationals Women)	Canberra	Australian Capital Territory	Southern Cross Stadium	2022
	Central Coast Crusaders	Central Coast	New South Wales	Breakers Indoor Sports Stadium	2022
	Hills Hornets	Sydney	New South Wales	Hills Sports Stadium	2022
	Hornsby Ku-ring-gai Spiders	Sydney	New South Wales	Barker College; Thornleigh Brickpit Basketball Sports Stadium	2023
	Illawarra Hawks	Wollongong	New South Wales	Snakepit Stadium	2022
	Inner West Bulls	Sydney	New South Wales	ELS Hall Park	2022
	Maitland Mustangs	Maitland	New South Wales	Maitland Federation Centre	2022
	Manly Warringah Sea Eagles	Sydney	New South Wales	Northern Beaches Indoor Sports Centre	2022
	Newcastle Falcons	Newcastle	New South Wales	Newcastle Basketball Stadium	2022
	Norths Bears	Sydney	New South Wales	North Sydney Indoor Sports Centre	2022
	Sutherland Sharks	Sydney	New South Wales	Sutherland Basketball Stadium	2022
	Sydney Comets	Sydney	New South Wales	Comets Stadium	2023

== List of Champions ==
Men			Women		
Teams		Year(s) won	Teams		Year(s) won
Sydney Comets	5	2002, 2003, 2004, 2005, 2015	Bankstown Bruins	11	1997, 1998, 1999, 2003, 2004, 2005, 2006, 2010, 2012, 2015, 2026
Bankstown Bruins	4	1993, 1996, 1997, 2016	Manly Warringah Sea Eagles	4	1991, 1992, 2017, 2025
Illawarra Hawks	4	1998, 1999, 2001, 2011	Newcastle Hunters/Falcons	4	2016, 2019, 2021, 2024
Sutherland Sharks	4	2006, 2007, 2008, 2023	Sutherland Sharks	3	1993, 1995, 2021
Manly Warringah Sea Eagles	4	2010, 2013, 2020, 2021	ACT Academy	3	2000, 2001, 2002
Norths Bears	4	2012, 2014, 2017, 2026	Hornsby Spiders	3	2007, 2009, 2014
Parramatta Wildcats	2	1994, 2009	Norths Bears	3	2018, 2020, 2023
Newcastle Hunters	2	2000, 2018	Wagga Wolves	1	1994
Canberra Gunners	2	2022, 2025	Parramatta Wildcats	1	1996
Goulburn Bears	1	1991	Sydney Comets	1	2008
Sydney Sonics	1	1992	Canberra Nationals	1	2011
ACT	1	1995	Illawarra Hawks	1	2013
Central Coast Crusaders	1	2019	Albury Wodonga Bandits	1	2022
BA Centre of Excellence	1	2021			
Maitland Mustangs	1	2024			
