= 2026 WNBL Finals =

Women's National Basketball League Finals

Team	Coach	Wins
Townsville Fire	Shannon Seebohm	2
Perth Lynx	Ryan Petrik	0
- Dates: 14 February – 1 March
- Season: 2025–26
- Teams: 4
- MVP: Courtney Woods (TSV)
- Semifinalists: Bendigo Spirit; Southside Melbourne Flyers
- Matches played: 7
- Attendance: 16,588 (2,370 per match)
- All statistics correct as of 1 March 2025.

The 2026 WNBL Finals was the postseason tournament of the WNBL's 2025–26 season. The Bendigo Spirit were the defending champions, but they were defeated by Perth in the Semi Finals. The Townsville Fire went on to win their fifth Championship title after defeating Perth in overtime to sweep the Championship series, 2–0. Townsville Fire Captain, Courtney Woods was awarded the Rachael Sporn Medal for Grand Final MVP. The WNBL Finals schedule was confirmed 8 February 2025, followed by the Championship series schedule announced 22 February 2026.

== Overview ==
=== Finals appearances ===
- The Townsville Fire qualified for Finals for the fourth consecutive season.
- The Perth Lynx qualified for Finals for the fifth consecutive season.
- The Bendigo Spirit qualified for Finals for the second consecutive season.
- The Southside Melbourne Flyers returned to the Finals for the first time since 2024.
- The Canberra Capitals missed Finals for the fourth consecutive season.
- The Geelong Venom missed Finals for the second consecutive season.
- The Adelaide Lightning missed Finals for the fourth consecutive season.
- The Sydney Flames missed Finals for the first time after returning in 2025.

== Standings ==
#	2025–26 WNBL Championship ladder				
#	Team	W	L	PCT	GP
1	Townsville Fire	19	4	118.3	23
2	Perth Lynx	18	5	113.2	23
3	Bendigo Spirit	16	7	106.3	23
4	Southside Melbourne Flyers	11	12	101.2	23
5	Canberra Capitals	9	14	92.4	23
6	Geelong Venom	7	16	94.4	23
7	Adelaide Lightning	6	17	89.9	23
8	Sydney Flames	6	17	88.7	23

== Bracket ==
Semi Finals
1	Townsville Fire	2
4	Southside Melbourne Flyers	1
3	Bendigo Spirit	0
2	Perth Lynx	2

Grand Final
1	Townsville Fire	2
2	Perth Lynx	0

== Semi-Finals ==
=== (1) Townsville Fire vs. (4) Southside Melbourne Flyers ===
15 February 2026
3:00 PM (AEST)

Box Score

Townsville Fire	88–60	Southside Melbourne Flyers
Scoring by quarter: 23–6, 20–13, 21–25, 24–16
Pts: Ellis 20; Rebs: Froling 8 Asts: Olsen 7		Pts: Bourne 14; Rebs: George 10; Asts: Rocci 4

Townsville Entertainment Centre, Townsville, Queensland
Attendance: 3,675
Referees: Madison Crowley-Long, Joshua Durand, Nathan Paff

18 February 2026
7:00 PM (AEDT)

Box Score

Southside Melbourne Flyers	109–89	Townsville Fire
Scoring by quarter: 26–20, 23–23, 33–22, 27–24
Pts: George 32; Rebs: George 11; Asts: Rocci 11		Pts: Sowah 27; Rebs: Froling 7 Asts: Woods 5

State Basketball Centre, Melbourne, Victoria
Attendance: 2,014
Referees: Kyle Easther, Hugh Starkey, Travis Stewart

22 February 2026
3:00 PM (AEST)

Box Score

Townsville Fire	84–74	Southside Melbourne Flyers
Scoring by quarter: 21–25, 32–21, 17–15, 14–13
Pts: Froling 26; Rebs: Fowler, Froling 9 Asts: Olsen 5		Pts: George 25; Rebs: Bourne 8 Asts: Rocci 8
Townsville win series, 2–1

Townsville Entertainment Centre, Townsville, Queensland
Attendance: 3,475
Referees: Daniel Battye, Hugh Starkey, Travis Stewart

Regular season series
Townsville won 2–1 in the regular season series

31 October 2025

Box Score

Southside Melbourne Flyers 89, Townsville Fire 83

State Basketball Centre, Melbourne, Victoria

29 November 2025

Box Score

Townsville Fire 84, Southside Melbourne Flyers 63

Townsville Entertainment Centre, Townsville, Queensland

11 January 2026

Box Score

Southside Melbourne Flyers 84, Townsville Fire 90

Parkville Stadium, Melbourne, Victoria

=== (2) Perth Lynx vs. (3) Bendigo Spirit ===
14 February 2026
1:00 PM (AWST)

Box Score

Perth Lynx	86–76	Bendigo Spirit
Scoring by quarter: 29–22, 19–20, 19–10, 19–24
Pts: Maley, Wilson 24; Rebs: Maley 13; Asts: Maley, Wilson 5		Pts: Borlase 22; Rebs: Borlase 16; Asts: Borlase 7

Perth High Performance Centre, Perth, Western Australia
Attendance: 2,178
Referees: Daniel Battye, Jacqueline Dover, Brad Henshaw

17 February 2026
7:00 PM (AEDT)

Box Score

Bendigo Spirit	75–81	Perth Lynx
Scoring by quarter: 21–20, 17–23, 24–21, 13–17
Pts: Borlase 23; Rebs: Griffin 15; Asts: Borlase 8		Pts: Han 25; Rebs: Han, Maley 14; Asts: Wilson 6
Perth win series, 2–0

Red Energy Arena, Bendigo, Victoria
Attendance: 1,355
Referees: Scott Beker, Shannon Jennings, Bianca Vernon

Regular season series
Perth won 2–1 in the regular season series

16 November 2025

Box Score

Perth Lynx 79, Bendigo Spirit 64

Perth High Performance Centre, Perth, Western Australia

23 November 2025

Box Score

Bendigo Spirit 87, Perth Lynx 58

Gippsland Regional Indoor Sports Stadium, Traralgon, Victoria

1 February 2026

Box Score

Bendigo Spirit 64, Perth Lynx 88

Red Energy Arena, Bendigo, Victoria

== Championship Series ==
=== (1) Townsville Fire vs. (2) Perth Lynx ===
26 February 2026
6:00 PM (AEST)

Box Score

Townsville Fire	88–79	Perth Lynx
Scoring by quarter: 20–22, 22–23, 24–10, 22–24
Pts: Woods 22; Rebs: Ellis, Fowler, Froling 7 Asts: Ellis 6		Pts: Atwell 19; Rebs: Maley 15; Asts: Maley 6

Townsville Entertainment Centre, Townsville, Queensland
Attendance: 3,891
Referees: Daniel Battye, Shannon Jennings, Bianca Vernon

1 March 2026
1:00 PM (AWST)

Box Score

Perth Lynx	105–108 (OT)	Townsville Fire
Scoring by quarter: 26–20, 19–30, 26–24, 21–18, Overtime: 13–16
Pts: Maley 27; Rebs: Maley 19; Asts: Wilson 9		Pts: Woods 28; Rebs: Fowler 9 Asts: Woods 7
Townsville win series, 2–0

Perth High Performance Centre, Perth, Western Australia
Referees: Joshua Durand, Hugh Starkey, Travis Stewart

Regular season series
Townsville won 2–1 in the regular season series

11 November 2025

Box Score

Perth Lynx 70, Townsville Fire 79

Perth High Performance Centre, Perth, Western Australia

12 December 2025

Box Score

Townsville Fire 81, Perth Lynx 97

Townsville Entertainment Centre, Townsville, Queensland

20 January 2026

Box Score

Perth Lynx 76, Townsville Fire 82

Perth High Performance Centre, Perth, Western Australia

=== Rosters ===
2025–26 Townsville Fire roster
Players
Coaches

Pos.	No.	Nat.	Name	Ht.
F	0	(Australia)	Horvat, Chantel (IRP)	1.87 m (6 ft 2 in)
G	1	(Australia)	Sowah, Miela	1.80 m (5 ft 11 in)
G/F	7	(Australia)	Woods, Courtney (C)	1.83 m (6 ft 0 in)
F	9	(Australia)	Froling, Alicia (C)	1.90 m (6 ft 3 in)
G	11	(Australia)	Forster, Chloe	1.78 m (5 ft 10 in)
F	12	(Australia)	Fowler, Alex	1.88 m (6 ft 2 in)
G/F	16	(Australia)	Crichton, Dakota	1.85 m (6 ft 1 in)
G	23	(Australia)	Ellis, Abbey	1.68 m (5 ft 6 in)
F	25	(Australia)	Van Es, Caitlyn (DP)	1.90 m (6 ft 3 in)
C	31	(Australia)	Edwards, Jessie (IRP)	1.94 m (6 ft 4 in)
F	33	(United States)	Olsen, Lucy (I)	1.78 m (5 ft 10 in)

Head coach

- (Australia) Shannon Seebohm

Assistant coach(es)

- (Australia) Miles Bench
- (Australia) Marcus Wong

Legend

- (C) Team captain
- (DP) Development player
- (I) Import player
- (IRP) Injury replacement player
- Injured

- Roster
Updated: 26 February 2026

2025–26 Perth Lynx roster
Players
Coaches

Pos.	No.	Nat.	Name	Ht.
G	2	(Australia)	Gorman, Stephanie	1.83 m (6 ft 0 in)
G	3	(Australia)	Weir, Kyana (DP)	1.70 m (5 ft 7 in)
G	5	(Australia)	Wilson, Alex	1.80 m (5 ft 11 in)
G	7	(Australia)	Scafidi, Jaya (DP)	1.72 m (5 ft 8 in)
G	8	(Australia)	Ciabattoni, Alex	1.80 m (5 ft 11 in)
F	9	(Australia)	Waite, Kiara	1.90 m (6 ft 3 in)
G	10	(New Zealand)	Graham, Tegan	1.77 m (5 ft 10 in)
C	20	(United States)	Morris, Yemiyah (I)	1.98 m (6 ft 6 in)
C	21	(China)	Han Xu (I)	2.11 m (6 ft 11 in)
F	24	(Australia)	Maley, Anneli (C)	1.85 m (6 ft 1 in)
G	25	(Australia)	Atwell, Amy (C)	1.83 m (6 ft 0 in)
G	42	(Australia)	Fotu, Alira	1.68 m (5 ft 6 in)

Head coach

- (Australia) Ryan Petrik

Assistant coach(es)

- (Australia) Andrew Cooper
- (United States) Devondrick Walker

Legend

- (C) Team captain
- (DP) Development player
- (I) Import player
- Injured

- Roster
Updated: 26 February 2026
