= 2025–26 WNBL season =

- League: Women's National Basketball League
- Sport: Basketball
- Duration: 18 October 2025 – 1 March 2026
- Teams: 8
- TV partner(s): 9Now; ESPN; Disney+

Regular season
- Top seed: Townsville Fire
- Season MVP: Isobel Borlase (BEN)
- Top scorer: Isobel Borlase (BEN)

Finals
- Champions: Townsville Fire
- Runners-up: Perth Lynx
- Finals MVP: Courtney Woods (TSV)

WNBL seasons
- ← 2024–25 2026–27 →

The 2025–26 WNBL season is the 46th season of the competition since its establishment in 1981. The Bendigo Spirit were the defending champions, but were defeated in the Semi Finals. The Townsville Fire won their fifth championship title after defeating Perth, 2–0 in the Grand Final series.

This marks the first season since a change in league ownership in April 2025, after Basketball Australia sold the league to a new consortium co-managed by the National Basketball League. The league released a new logo and brand to mark this new era for the league. Several clubs also launched new club logos, including a name change for the newly branded Geelong Venom.

In June 2025, the season schedule was confirmed to feature a 92-game regular season with clubs playing an increased 23 games over 17 rounds. The Finals Series will again feature best-of-three Semi-Finals’ & Championship series. In September 2025, the WNBL signed a two-year broadcast deal which sees all regular season & Finals games live and free on 9Now for the fourth consecutive season, plus majority of games broadcast on ESPN. Every game will also be available for streaming via ESPN on Disney+ This season sees the WNBL's broadcast expand to additional games on 9Go! and ESPN2, with additional paid coverage via Kayo, Foxtel and Fetch.

== Ladder ==
#	2025–26 WNBL Championship ladder				
#	Team	W	L	PCT	GP
1	Townsville Fire	19	4	118.3	23
2	Perth Lynx	18	5	113.2	23
3	Bendigo Spirit	16	7	106.3	23
4	Southside Melbourne Flyers	11	12	101.2	23
5	Canberra Capitals	9	14	92.4	23
6	Geelong Venom	7	16	94.4	23
7	Adelaide Lightning	6	17	89.9	23
8	Sydney Flames	6	17	88.7	23

== Regular season ==
=== Round 1 ===
18 October 2025	Southside Melbourne Flyers	71–80	Canberra Capitals	John Cain Arena, Melbourne
2:00 PM (AEDT)	Scoring by quarter: 16–24, 22–24, 18–18, 15–14
9Now, 9Go!, ESPN	Pts: Reed 22; Rebs: Bourne 9 Asts: Rocci 7	Box Score	Pts: Blicavs 19; Rebs: Blicavs, Morrell 9 Asts: Melbourne 8	Attendance: 4,342

18 October 2025	Geelong Venom	77–85	Sydney Flames	Geelong Arena, Geelong
7:00 PM (AEDT)	Scoring by quarter: 22–26, 8–22, 22–16, 25–21
9Now, ESPN 2	Pts: Holmes 20; Rebs: Holmes 11; Asts: Rotunno 8	Box Score	Pts: Nicholson 27; Rebs: Froling 12; Asts: Cann, Froling 7

19 October 2025	Bendigo Spirit	66–74	Townsville Fire	Bendigo Stadium, Bendigo
12:30 PM (AEDT)	Scoring by quarter: 19–23, 15–21, 19–10, 13–20
9Now, 9Go!	Pts: Borlase 17; Rebs: Borlase, Tolo 8 Asts: Wehrung 5	Box Score	Pts: Ellis 31; Rebs: Ellis, Fowler 10; Asts: Ellis 4	Attendance: 1,269

19 October 2025	Adelaide Lightning	72–75	Perth Lynx	SA State Basketball Centre, Adelaide
6:00 PM (ACDT)	Scoring by quarter: 9–26, 24–18, 18–13, 21–18
9Now, ESPN	Pts: Feagin 16; Rebs: Talbot 10; Asts: Talbot 8	Box Score	Pts: Ciabattoni 23; Rebs: Maley 15; Asts: Turner 6	Attendance: 1,964

=== Round 2 ===
24 October 2025	Sydney Flames	76–81	Southside Melbourne Flyers	State Sports Centre, Sydney
7:00 PM (AEDT)	Scoring by quarter: 28–22, 15–21, 16–19, 17–19
9Now, ESPN	Pts: Nicholson 17; Rebs: Froling, Thompson 9 Asts: Nicholson 4	Box Score	Pts: George 19; Rebs: George 11; Asts: Andrews 7	Attendance: 1,407

25 October 2025	Geelong Venom	110–76	Adelaide Lightning	Geelong Arena, Geelong
3:00 PM (AEDT)	Scoring by quarter: 16–25, 32–13, 32–22, 30–16
9Now, ESPN 2	Pts: Holmes 33; Rebs: Three players 6 Asts: Potter, Shelley 5	Box Score	Pts: Loughridge 18; Rebs: Robati, Talbot 5 Asts: Talbot 6	Attendance: 1,236

25 October 2025	Canberra Capitals	70–105	Townsville Fire	AIS Arena, Canberra
7:00 PM (AEDT)	Scoring by quarter: 21–28, 12–26, 25–21, 12–30
9Now, 9Go!, ESPN 2	Pts: Sissoko 20; Rebs: Sissoko 8 Asts: Melbourne 6	Box Score	Pts: Horvat 20; Rebs: Horvat, Froling 9 Asts: Woods 14	Attendance: 3,166

26 October 2025	Perth Lynx	73–67	Sydney Flames	Perth High Performance Centre, Perth
3:30 PM (AWST)	Scoring by quarter: 16–22, 18–20, 14–16, 25–9
9Now, ESPN	Pts: Atwell 24; Rebs: Maley 17; Asts: Ciabattoni 4	Box Score	Pts: Nicholson 25; Rebs: Thompson 12; Asts: Cann 9	Attendance: 2,115

28 October 2025	Bendigo Spirit	62–55	Geelong Venom	Bendigo Stadium, Bendigo
7:00 PM (AEDT)	Scoring by quarter: 18–18, 22–12, 9–12, 13–13
9Now, ESPN	Pts: Borlase 20; Rebs: Tolo 9 Asts: Borlase 3	Box Score	Pts: Holmes 30; Rebs: Holmes 12; Asts: Shelley 5	Attendance: 1,685

=== Round 3 ===
31 October 2025	Southside Melbourne Flyers	89–83	Townsville Fire	State Basketball Centre, Melbourne
7:00 PM (AEDT)	Scoring by quarter: 19–14, 17–24, 21–14, 32–31
9Now, ESPN	Pts: George 26; Rebs: George 12; Asts: Rocci 5	Box Score	Pts: Woods 23; Rebs: Froling 10; Asts: Woods 9	Attendance: 2,762

1 November 2025	Adelaide Lightning	73–65	Canberra Capitals	SA State Basketball Centre, Adelaide
2:30 PM (ACDT)	Scoring by quarter: 22–21, 19–19, 17–10, 15–15
9Now, ESPN	Pts: Feagin 19; Rebs: Feagin 10; Asts: Talbot 4	Box Score	Pts: Morrell 15; Rebs: Sissoko 9 Asts: Melbourne 9	Attendance: 1,806

1 November 2025	Geelong Venom	76–77	Perth Lynx	Geelong Arena, Geelong
7:00 PM (AEDT)	Scoring by quarter: 15–20, 22–20, 20–18, 19–19
9Now, ESPN 2	Pts: Holmes 22; Rebs: Holmes 16; Asts: Three players 3	Box Score	Pts: Maley 15; Rebs: Turner 16; Asts: Ciabattoni, Atwell 3	Attendance: 1,280

2 November 2025	Bendigo Spirit	88–75	Sydney Flames	Bendigo Stadium, Bendigo
12:30 PM (AEDT)	Scoring by quarter: 23–18, 17–18, 30–21, 18–18
9Now, 9Go!, ESPN	Pts: Borlase 26; Rebs: Griffin 14; Asts: McConnell 6	Box Score	Pts: Nicholson 27; Rebs: Époupa 9 Asts: Cann, Morgan 4	Attendance: 846

4 November 2025	Perth Lynx	70–79	Townsville Fire	Perth High Performance Centre, Perth
6:00 PM (AWST)	Scoring by quarter: 17–26, 26–18, 7–18, 20–17
9Now, ESPN	Pts: Maley 21; Rebs: Maley 14; Asts: Turner 5	Box Score	Pts: Sowah 26; Rebs: Cox 12; Asts: Woods 9	Attendance: 1,621

=== Round 4 ===
6 November 2025	Sydney Flames	73–64	Canberra Capitals	State Sports Centre, Sydney
7:00 PM (AEDT)	Scoring by quarter: 17–14, 14–12, 21–12, 21-26
9Now, ESPN	Pts: Swain, Thompson 19; Rebs: Thompson 9 Asts: Époupa 5	Box Score	Pts: Blicavs 18; Rebs: Morrell 10; Asts: Melbourne 6	Attendance: 1,467

7 November 2025	Geelong Venom	61–86	Townsville Fire	Geelong Arena, Geelong
5:30 PM (AEDT)	Scoring by quarter: 15-25, 12-20, 24–17, 10-24
9Now, ESPN	Pts: Holmes 24; Rebs: Holmes 8 Asts: Shelley 8	Box Score	Pts: Sowah 20; Rebs: Froling 13; Asts: Woods 6	Attendance: 1,110

8 November 2025	Bendigo Spirit	73–71	Canberra Capitals	Bendigo Stadium, Bendigo
7:00 PM (AEDT)	Scoring by quarter: 28–18, 16-19, 11-21, 18–13
9Now, ESPN	Pts: Borlase 25; Rebs: Griffin 16; Asts: Pollerd 4	Box Score	Pts: Sissoko 19; Rebs: Munger 7 Asts: Melbourne 4	Attendance: 1,122

9 November 2025	Adelaide Lightning	88–71	Sydney Flames	SA State Basketball Centre, Adelaide
12:00 PM (ACDT)	Scoring by quarter: 24–14, 22–19, 28–10, 14-28
9Now, ESPN	Pts: Sundell 20; Rebs: Feagin 9 Asts: Loughridge 6	Box Score	Pts: Swain 16; Rebs: Thompson 7 Asts: Three players 3	Attendance: 1,726

9 November 2025	Perth Lynx	79–76	Southside Melbourne Flyers	Perth High Performance Centre, Perth
3:30 PM (AWST)	Scoring by quarter: 18-22, 21–20, 13-24, 27–10
9Now, ESPN	Pts: Maley 22; Rebs: Maley 13; Asts: Wilson 4	Box Score	Pts: Bourne 22; Rebs: George 14; Asts: Rocci 10	Attendance: 1,146

11 November 2025	Geelong Venom	88–69	Perth Lynx	Geelong Arena, Geelong
7:00 PM (AEDT)	Scoring by quarter: 23-25, 15-19, 26–14, 24–11
9Now, ESPN	Pts: Holmes 22; Rebs: Holmes 12; Asts: Rotunno 10	Box Score	Pts: Atwell 22; Rebs: Morris, Turner 7 Asts: Wilson 6	Attendance: 815

=== Round 5 ===
14 November 2025	Geelong Venom	66–54	Southside Melbourne Flyers	Geelong Arena, Geelong
5:30 PM (AEDT)	Scoring by quarter: 20–21, 14–9, 15–17, 17–7
9Now, ESPN 2	Pts: Holmes 20; Rebs: Sharp 11; Asts: Rotunno, Shelley 4	Box Score	Pts: Bourne 21; Rebs: George 16; Asts: Rocci 5	Attendance: 1,264

15 November 2025	Canberra Capitals	96–56	Sydney Flames	AIS Arena, Canberra
3:00 PM (AEDT)	Scoring by quarter: 34–10, 21–16, 25–9, 16–21
9Now, 9Go!, ESPN	Pts: Blicavs 17; Rebs: Morrell 10; Asts: Melbourne 7	Box Score	Pts: Thompson 19; Rebs: Swain 6 Asts: Nicholson, Swain 5	Attendance: 3,168

15 November 2025	Townsville Fire	103–69	Adelaide Lightning	Townsville Entertainment and Convention Centre, Townsville
6:00 PM (AEST)	Scoring by quarter: 26–22, 21–21, 31–15, 25–11
9Now, ESPN 2	Pts: Sowah, Woods 19; Rebs: Froling 8 Asts: Fowler, Woods 6	Box Score	Pts: Loughridge 26; Rebs: Feagin 6 Asts: Loughridge 6	Attendance: 2,971

16 November 2025	Perth Lynx	79–64	Bendigo Spirit	Perth High Performance Centre, Perth
3:30 PM (AWST)	Scoring by quarter: 21–19, 17–16, 28–15, 13–14
9Now, ESPN	Pts: Atwell 21; Rebs: Maley 16; Asts: Wilson 10	Box Score	Pts: Borlase 16; Rebs: Griffin 9 Asts: McConnell, Tolo 3	Attendance: 907

18 November 2025	Adelaide Lightning	74–82	Bendigo Spirit	SA State Basketball Centre, Adelaide
6:30 PM (ACDT)	Scoring by quarter: 19–25, 17–20, 15–22, 23–15
9Now, ESPN	Pts: Feagin 22; Rebs: Robati 6 Asts: Talbot 6	Box Score	Pts: Borlase 24; Rebs: Griffin 12; Asts: Borlase 5	Attendance: 1,326

=== Round 6 ===
21 November 2025	Adelaide Lightning	99–93(OT)	Geelong Venom	SA State Basketball Centre, Adelaide
6:30 PM (ACDT)	Scoring by quarter: 27–24, 25–22, 13–21, 19–17, Overtime: 15–9
9Now, ESPN 2	Pts: Talbot 32; Rebs: Robati, Talbot 9 Asts: Feagin 11	Box Score	Pts: Shelley 24; Rebs: Holmes 9 Asts: Shelley 6	Attendance: 1,656

22 November 2025	Southside Melbourne Flyers	93–76	Sydney Flames	State Basketball Centre, Melbourne
3:00 PM (AEDT)	Scoring by quarter: 28–21, 23–20, 19–16, 23–19
9Now, ESPN	Pts: Bourne 26; Rebs: Peters 8 Asts: George 5	Box Score	Pts: Thompson 22; Rebs: McSpadden 7 Asts: Swain 7	Attendance: 1,867

22 November 2025	Townsville Fire	101–61	Canberra Capitals	Townsville Entertainment and Convention Centre, Townsville
6:00 PM (AEST)	Scoring by quarter: 26–18, 31–13, 23–13, 21–17
9Now, ESPN 2	Pts: Woods 18; Rebs: Cox 10; Asts: Woods 5	Box Score	Pts: Clark 10; Rebs: Sissoko 8 Asts: Brancatisano 4	Attendance: 2,903

23 November 2025	Bendigo Spirit	87–58	Perth Lynx	Gippsland Regional Indoor Sports Stadium, Traralgon
12:30 PM (AEDT)	Scoring by quarter: 16–20, 21–13, 23–10, 27–15
9Now, 9Go!, ESPN	Pts: Borlase 26; Rebs: Griffin 11; Asts: Borlase, McConnell 5	Box Score	Pts: Wilson 16; Rebs: Maley 11; Asts: Wilson 5	Attendance: 559

25 November 2025	Adelaide Lightning	64–90	Townsville Fire	SA State Basketball Centre, Adelaide
7:00 PM (ACDT)	Scoring by quarter: 19–26, 17–21, 9–22, 19–21
9Now, ESPN	Pts: Feagin 18; Rebs: Robati 6 Asts: Talbot 5	Box Score	Pts: Froling 22; Rebs: Froling 11; Asts: Woods 7	Attendance: 1,444

=== Round 7 ===
26 November 2025	Sydney Flames	97–94(OT)	Geelong Venom	State Sports Centre, Sydney
7:00 PM (AEDT)	Scoring by quarter: 15–19, 24–24, 22–19, 20–19, Overtime: 16–13
9Now, ESPN	Pts: Froling 24; Rebs: Thompson 9 Asts: Swain 6	Box Score	Pts: Holmes 28; Rebs: Holmes 10; Asts: Shelley 4	Attendance: 956

28 November 2025	Sydney Flames	64–80	Bendigo Spirit	State Sports Centre, Sydney
7:30 PM (AEDT)	Scoring by quarter: 13–26, 19–16, 24–13, 8–25
9Now, ESPN	Pts: Thompson 14; Rebs: Thompson 10; Asts: Cann 4	Box Score	Pts: Three players 21; Rebs: McConnell 13; Asts: McConnell 6	Attendance: 1,086

29 November 2025	Canberra Capitals	67–91	Perth Lynx	AIS Arena, Canberra
5:00 PM (AEDT)	Scoring by quarter: 17–23, 19–20, 21–27, 10–21
9Now, ESPN	Pts: Munger 12; Rebs: Melbourne 6 Asts: Clark 4	Box Score	Pts: Atwell, Han 22; Rebs: Maley 12; Asts: Maley 4	Attendance: 3,015

29 November 2025	Townsville Fire	84–63	Southside Melbourne Flyers	Townsville Entertainment and Convention Centre, Townsville
6:00 PM (AEST)	Scoring by quarter: 23–18, 16–16, 18–15, 27–14
9Now, ESPN	Pts: Sowah 20; Rebs: Froling 11; Asts: Woods 7	Box Score	Pts: Bourne 28; Rebs: George 13; Asts: Rocci 7	Attendance: 3,217

30 November 2025	Bendigo Spirit	71–65	Adelaide Lightning	Bendigo Stadium, Bendigo
12:30 PM (AEDT)	Scoring by quarter: 19–19, 24–27, 19–11, 9–8
9Now, 9Go!, ESPN	Pts: Borlase 27; Rebs: Griffin 8 Asts: Three players 2	Box Score	Pts: Feagin 26; Rebs: Talbot 11; Asts: Feagin, Loughridge 4	Attendance: 1,241

=== Round 8 ===
5 December 2025	Bendigo Spirit	vs.	Geelong Venom	Ballarat Sports Events Centre, Ballarat
5:30 PM (AEDT)
9Now, ESPN

5 December 2025	Perth Lynx	vs.	Southside Melbourne Flyers	Perth High Performance Centre, Perth
6:30 PM (AWST)
9Now, ESPN

6 December 2025	Townsville Fire	vs.	Sydney Flames	Townsville Entertainment and Convention Centre, Townsville
6:00 PM (AEST)
9Now, ESPN

7 December 2025	Geelong Venom	vs.	Canberra Capitals	Geelong Arena, Geelong
12:30 PM (AEDT)
9Now, 9Go!, ESPN

7 December 2025	Southside Melbourne Flyers	vs.	Bendigo Spirit	State Basketball Centre, Melbourne
6:30 PM (AEDT)
9Now, ESPN

9 December 2025	Canberra Capitals	vs.	Adelaide Lightning	AIS Arena, Canberra
7:30 PM (AEDT)
9Now, ESPN

=== Round 9 ===
12 December 2025	Canberra Capitals	vs.	Southside Melbourne Flyers	AIS Arena, Canberra
7:00 PM (AEDT)
9Now, ESPN

13 December 2025	Geelong Venom	vs.	Bendigo Spirit	Geelong Arena, Geelong
7:00 PM (AEDT)
9Now, ESPN

14 December 2025	Sydney Flames	vs.	Adelaide Lightning	State Sports Centre, Sydney
12:30 PM (AEDT)
9Now, ESPN

14 December 2025	Townsville Fire	vs.	Perth Lynx	Townsville Entertainment and Convention Centre, Townsville
5:30 PM (AEST)
9Now, ESPN

16 December 2025	Southside Melbourne Flyers	vs.	Geelong Venom	State Basketball Centre, Melbourne
7:00 PM (AEDT)
9Now, ESPN

=== Round 10 ===
19 December 2025	Bendigo Spirit	vs.	Adelaide Lightning	Bendigo Stadium, Bendigo
5:30 PM (AEDT)
9Now, ESPN

20 December 2025	Sydney Flames	vs.	Townsville Fire	State Sports Centre, Sydney
3:00 PM (AEDT)
9Now, ESPN

20 December 2025	Canberra Capitals	vs.	Geelong Venom	AIS Arena, Canberra
7:00 PM (AEDT)
9Now, ESPN

21 December 2025	Southside Melbourne Flyers	vs.	Bendigo Spirit	State Basketball Centre, Melbourne
12:30 PM (AEDT)
9Now, ESPN

21 December 2025	Adelaide Lightning	vs.	Perth Lynx	SA State Basketball Centre, Adelaide
6:00 PM (ACDT)
9Now, ESPN

23 December 2025	Townsville Fire	vs.	Sydney Flames	Townsville Entertainment and Convention Centre, Townsville
6:00 PM (AEST)
9Now, ESPN

23 December 2025	Perth Lynx	vs.	Canberra Capitals	Perth High Performance Centre, Perth
6:00 PM (AWST)
9Now, ESPN

=== Round 11 ===
27 December 2025	Canberra Capitals	vs.	Sydney Flames	AIS Arena, Canberra
5:00 PM (AEDT)
9Now, ESPN

28 December 2025	Southside Melbourne Flyers	vs.	Adelaide Lightning	State Basketball Centre, Melbourne
12:30 PM (AEDT)
9Now, 9Go!, ESPN

28 December 2025	Perth Lynx	vs.	Geelong Venom	Perth High Performance Centre, Perth
3:30 PM (AWST)
9Now, ESPN

30 December 2025	Sydney Flames	vs.	Southside Melbourne Flyers	Sydney SuperDome, Sydney
5:00 PM (AEDT)
9Now, ESPN

31 December 2025	Townsville Fire	vs.	Bendigo Spirit	Townsville Entertainment and Convention Centre, Townsville
6:30 PM (AEST)
9Now, ESPN 2

=== Round 12 ===
2 January 2026	Perth Lynx	vs.	Adelaide Lightning	Perth High Performance Centre, Perth
2:30 PM (AWST)
9Now, ESPN 2

3 January 2026	Southside Melbourne Flyers	vs.	Geelong Venom	State Basketball Centre, Melbourne
7:00 PM (AEDT)
9Now, ESPN

4 January 2026	Canberra Capitals	vs.	Perth Lynx	AIS Arena, Canberra
12:30 PM (AEDT)
9Now, 9Go!

4 January 2026	Adelaide Lightning	vs.	Townsville Fire	SA State Basketball Centre, Adelaide
6:00 PM (ACDT)
9Now, ESPN

5 January 2026	Sydney Flames	vs.	Bendigo Spirit	Sydney SuperDome, Sydney
5:00 PM (AEDT)
9Now, ESPN

6 January 2026	Townsville Fire	vs.	Geelong Venom	Townsville Entertainment and Convention Centre, Townsville
6:00 PM (AEST)
9Now, ESPN

=== Round 13 ===
9 January 2026	Geelong Venom	vs.	Townsville Fire	Geelong Arena, Geelong
5:30 PM (AEDT)
9Now, ESPN 2

9 January 2026	Bendigo Spirit	vs.	Southside Melbourne Flyers	Bendigo Stadium, Bendigo
7:30 PM (AEDT)
9Now, ESPN 2

10 January 2026	Sydney Flames	vs.	Canberra Capitals	State Sports Centre, Sydney
3:00 PM (AEDT)
9Now, ESPN 2

10 January 2026	Perth Lynx	vs.	Adelaide Lightning	Perth High Performance Centre, Perth
4:00 PM (AWST)
9Now, ESPN 2

11 January 2026	Southside Melbourne Flyers	vs.	Townsville Fire	Parkville Stadium, Melbourne
12:30 PM (AEDT)
9Now, 9 Go!

13 January 2026	Adelaide Lightning	vs.	Sydney Flames	SA State Basketball Centre, Adelaide
6:30 PM (ACDT)
9Now, ESPN

=== Round 14 ===
15 January 2026	Perth Lynx	vs.	Bendigo Spirit	Perth Arena, Perth
4:00 PM (AWST)
9Now, ESPN

16 January 2026	Geelong Venom	vs.	Sydney Flames	Perth Arena, Perth
4:00 PM (AWST)
9Now, ESPN

17 January 2026	Southside Melbourne Flyers	vs.	Adelaide Lightning	Perth Arena, Perth
1:30 PM (AWST)
9Now, 9Go!, ESPN 2

18 January 2026	Townsville Fire	vs.	Canberra Capitals	Perth Arena, Perth
2:00 PM (AWST)
9Now, ESPN

20 January 2026	Adelaide Lightning	vs.	Canberra Capitals	SA State Basketball Centre, Adelaide
6:30 PM (ACDT)
9Now, ESPN

20 January 2026	Perth Lynx	vs.	Townsville Fire	Perth High Performance Centre, Perth
6:00 PM (AWST)
9Now, ESPN

=== Round 15 ===
23 January 2026	Bendigo Spirit	vs.	Canberra Capitals	Bendigo Stadium, Bendigo
7:30 PM (AEDT)
9Now, ESPN

24 January 2026	Geelong Venom	vs.	Adelaide Lightning	Geelong Arena, Geelong
3:00 PM (AEDT)
9Now, ESPN

24 January 2026	Townsville Fire	vs.	Southside Melbourne Flyers	Townsville Entertainment and Convention Centre, Townsville
6:00 PM (AEST)
9Now, ESPN

25 January 2026	Sydney Flames	vs.	Perth Lynx	Sydney SuperDome, Sydney
12:00 PM (AEDT)
9Now, ESPN

25 January 2026	Canberra Capitals	vs.	Bendigo Spirit	AIS Arena, Canberra
6:30 PM (AEDT)
9Now, ESPN

27 January 2026	Southside Melbourne Flyers	vs.	Perth Lynx	State Basketball Centre, Melbourne
7:00 PM (AEDT)
9Now, ESPN

=== Round 16 ===
30 January 2026	Geelong Venom	vs.	Bendigo Spirit	Geelong Arena, Geelong
5:30 PM (AEDT)
9Now, ESPN 2

31 January 2026	Southside Melbourne Flyers	vs.	Adelaide Lightning	State Basketball Centre, Melbourne
3:00 PM (AEDT)
9Now, ESPN

31 January 2026	Townsville Fire	vs.	Canberra Capitals	Townsville Entertainment and Convention Centre, Townsville
6:00 PM (AEST)
9Now, ESPN

1 February 2026	Sydney Flames	vs.	Geelong Venom	State Sports Centre, Sydney
12:30 PM (AEDT)
9Now, ESPN

1 February 2026	Bendigo Spirit	vs.	Perth Lynx	Bendigo Stadium, Bendigo
6:30 PM (AEDT)
9Now, ESPN

3 February 2026	Canberra Capitals	vs.	Southside Melbourne Flyers	AIS Arena, Canberra
7:00 PM (AEDT)
9Now, ESPN

=== Round 17 ===
7 February 2026	Canberra Capitals	vs.	Geelong Venom	AIS Arena, Canberra
3:00 PM (AEDT)
9Now, ESPN

7 February 2026	Perth Lynx	vs.	Sydney Flames	Perth High Performance Centre, Perth
4:00 PM (AWST)
9Now, ESPN

8 February 2026	Adelaide Lightning	vs.	Southside Melbourne Flyers	SA State Basketball Centre, Adelaide
12:00 PM (ACDT)
9Now, 9Go!, ESPN

8 February 2026	Townsville Fire	vs.	Bendigo Spirit	Townsville Entertainment and Convention Centre, Townsville
5:30 PM (AEST)
9Now, ESPN

== Statistics ==
=== Individual statistic leaders ===
Category	Player	Statistic
Points per game	Isobel Borlase (BEN)	22.8 PPG
Rebounds per game	Anneli Maley (PER)	14.2 RPG
Assists per game	Maddison Rocci (SMF)	6.8 APG
Steals per game	Jaz Shelley (GEE)	2.5 SPG
Blocks per game	Han Xu (PER)	2.0 BPG

=== Individual game highs ===
Category	Player	Statistic
Points	Isobel Borlase (BEN)	42
Rebounds	Anneli Maley (PER)	22
Assists	Courtney Woods (TSV)	14
Steals	Multiple players	6
Blocks	Lauren Cox (TSV)	7

== Awards ==
=== Postseason Awards ===
Award	Winner	Position	Team
Most Valuable Player	Isobel Borlase	Guard	Bendigo Spirit
Grand Final MVP	Courtney Woods	Guard	Townsville Fire
Defensive Player of the Year	Han Xu	Center	Perth Lynx
Sixth Woman of the Year	Lucy Olsen	Forward	Townsville Fire
Breakout Player of the Year	Dallas Loughridge	Guard	Adelaide Lightning
Coach of the Year	Kennedy Kereama	Coach	Bendigo Spirit
Leading Scorer Award	Isobel Borlase	Guard	Bendigo Spirit
Leading Rebounder Award	Anneli Maley	Forward	Perth Lynx
Golden Hands Award	Courtney Woods	Guard	Townsville Fire
Community Award	Nyaduoth Lok	Guard	Southside Melbourne Flyers
Fans MVP Award	Anneli Maley	Forward	Perth Lynx
Referee of the Year	Daniel Battye	Referee	
All-WNBL First Team	Alex Wilson	Guard	Perth Lynx
All-WNBL First Team	Courtney Woods	Guard	Townsville Fire
All-WNBL First Team	Isobel Borlase	Guard	Bendigo Spirit
All-WNBL First Team	Mackenzie Holmes	Forward	Geelong Venom
All-WNBL First Team	Anneli Maley	Forward	Perth Lynx
All-WNBL Second Team	Alex Ciabattoni	Guard	Perth Lynx
All-WNBL Second Team	Miela Sowah	Guard	Townsville Fire
All-WNBL Second Team	Kelsey Griffin	Forward	Bendigo Spirit
All-WNBL Second Team	Cayla George	Forward	Southside Melbourne Flyers
All-WNBL Second Team	Han Xu	Center	Perth Lynx

== Finals ==
Semi Finals
1	Townsville Fire	2
4	Southside Melbourne Flyers	1
3	Bendigo Spirit	0
2	Perth Lynx	2

Grand Final
1	Townsville Fire	2
2	Perth Lynx	0

== Team captains and coaches ==
Team	Captain	Coach
Adelaide Lightning	Stephanie Talbot	Aja Parham-Ammar (Note: Appointed interim Head Coach for 2025–26, after Kerryn Mitchell was dismissed.)
Bendigo Spirit	Kelsey Griffin	Kennedy Kereama
Canberra Capitals	Jade Melbourne	Paul Goriss
Geelong Venom	Alexandra Sharp / Jazmin Shelley (co)	Chris Lucas
Perth Lynx	Amy Atwell / Anneli Maley (co)	Ryan Petrik
Southside Melbourne Flyers	Cayla George / Maddison Rocci (co)	Kristi Harrower
Sydney Flames	Lauren Nicholson	Renae Garlepp (Note: Appointed as interim Head Coach for 2025–26 after Guy Molloy stepped down.)
Townsville Fire	Alicia Froling / Courtney Woods (co)	Shannon Seebohm
