= Courtney Woods =

Australian basketball player

No. 7 – Townsville Fire
- Position: Shooting guard / small forward
- League: WNBL

Personal information
- Born: 24 March 1997 (age 29)
- Listed height: 183 cm (6 ft 0 in)

Career information
- High school: St Margaret's Anglican Girls' School (Brisbane, Queensland)
- College: Northern Illinois (2015–2020)
- WNBA draft: 2020: undrafted
- Playing career: 2015–present

Career history
- 2015: Brisbane Capitals
- 2020–2021: Northside Wizards
- 2020–present: Townsville Fire
- 2022: Townsville Flames
- 2023: Northside Wizards
- 2024: Darwin Salties
- 2025: Northside Wizards
- 2026: Townsville Flames

Career highlights
- 2× WNBL champion (2023, 2026); WNBL Grand Final MVP (2026); 2× All-WNBL First Team (2025, 2026); 2× NBL1 North champion (2022, 2023); NBL1 North Finals MVP (2023); 2× NBL1 North Most Valuable Player (2023, 2026); 2× NBL1 North First Team (2023, 2026); NBL1 North Second Team (2024); 2× First-team All-MAC (2018, 2020)
Medals
Women's basketball
Representing Australia
Asia Cup
Gold medal – first place	2025 China

Courtney Michelle Woods (born 24 March 1997) is an Australian professional basketball player for the Townsville Fire of the Women's National Basketball League (WNBL). She played college basketball for the Northern Illinois Huskies before beginning her professional career in the WNBL in 2020 with the Fire. She won her first WNBL championship with the Fire in 2023. In 2026, she won her second WNBL championship and earned grand final MVP honours.

In the NBL1 North, Woods won back-to-back championships in 2022 and 2023 with the Townsville Flames and Northside Wizards respectively. She is a two-time NBL1 North Most Valuable Player, earning the honour in 2023 and 2026.

== Early life and career ==
Woods grew up in Brisbane, Queensland, where she attended St Margaret's Anglican Girls' School. She played badminton, basketball and field hockey at St. Margaret's. Woods served as basketball captain in 2014, and her team enjoyed two premiership-winning seasons coached by her mother. She played for Queensland's State U20 basketball team.

In 2014, Woods was a member of the Brisbane Spartans senior women's team in the South East Australian Basketball League. She did not appear in a game for the Spartans, and joined the Brisbane Capitals of the Queensland Basketball League for the 2015 season. In 15 games for the Capitals, she averaged 5.9 points, 3.9 rebounds and 1.2 assists per game.

== College career ==
Woods moved to the United States in 2015 to play college basketball for the Northern Illinois Huskies.

As a freshman in 2015–16, Woods played in all 30 games and started the last 11 games of the season. She had three 20-point games during the season and averaged 10.3 points per game. She had 24 points and 10 rebounds against Western Michigan on 24 February 2016.

As a sophomore in 2016–17, Woods played and started in all 33 games for the Huskies. She ranked seventh in the Mid-American Conference (MAC) with 16.6 points per game and set a new NIU single-season record with 105 three-pointers, becoming just the fifth player in MAC history to surpass 100. Additionally, she became only the third underclassman in program history to score 500 points in a season, finishing with 547—one shy of the record set in 1987–88. She recorded nine 20-point games, including 24 points against Chicago State on 22 November 2016. She was named to the MAC All-Tournament Team after scoring 19 points in the semifinal round of the 2017 MAC women's basketball tournament against Western Michigan.

As a junior in 2017–18, Woods started all 30 games for the Huskies and averaged a league-leading 22.1 points a game, ranking third all time in NIU history. She scored a single-season high 664 points, the most by a Huskie junior in school history. She recorded six 30-point games, including a career-high 39 points twice; the first against Western Illinois on 18 November 2017 and the second against Kent State on 3 January 2018. She had a career-best 239 rebounds and averaged eight per game, recording a career-high 15 rebounds against Ball State on 27 January. She earned four player of the week awards and earned first-team All-MAC honours.

In the 2018–19 season, Woods played in the first seven games before suffering a season-ending ACL injury. She had earned two player of the weeks awards and was averaging 20.1 points per game.

As a redshirt senior in 2019–20, Woods again earned first-team All-MAC honours after averaging 18.5 points, 6.0 rebounds and 3.0 assists per game. She scored in double figures in 24 of 30 games, scoring a season-high 36 points against Toledo on 7 March 2020. She finished her career as the NIU all-time leader with 323 three-pointers and 130 games. She also finished second all time at NIU in scoring with 2,216 points.

Woods completed two degrees while at NIU: a Bachelor of Health Science and Masters in Sports Management.

=== College statistics ===
Year	Team	GP	GS	MPG	FG%	3P%	FT%	RPG	APG	SPG	BPG	PPG
2015–16	Northern Illinois	30	11	23.9	.391	.342	.725	4.2	2.0	.7	.5	10.3
2016–17	Northern Illinois	33	33	33.2	.411	.395	.892	5.5	1.9	1.4	.5	16.6
2017–18	Northern Illinois	30	30	34.5	.454	.408	.846	8.0	3.3	1.4	.2	22.1
2018–19	Northern Illinois	7	7	30.9	.413	.333	.795	6.6	2.0	1.9	.1	20.1
2019–20	Northern Illinois	30	30	33.0	.432	.326	.857	6.0	3.0	1.1	.2	18.5
Career		130	111	31.2	.425	.371	.838	5.9	2.5	1.2	.3	17.0

== Professional career ==
Woods joined the Northside Wizards for the 2020 Queensland State League (QSL), where she averaged 24.1 points, 7.0 rebounds, 3.7 assists and 1.9 steals in seven games.

On 2 July 2020, Woods signed a two-year deal with the Townsville Fire of the Women's National Basketball League (WNBL). She joined the Fire for the 2020 WNBL Hub season in Queensland, helping the team reach the grand final, where they lost 99–82 to the Southside Flyers. She averaged 10.1 minutes in the regular season and played just two minutes in the grand final loss. In 14 games, she averaged 6.1 points and 1.6 rebounds per game.

Woods re-joined the Northside Wizards, now in the NBL1 North, for the 2021 season. In 11 games, she averaged 21.6 points, 6.7 rebounds, 2.3 assists and 1.5 steals per game.

With the Fire in the 2021–22 WNBL season, Woods averaged 7.6 points and 3.3 rebounds in 16 games.

Woods joined the Townsville Flames for the 2022 NBL1 North season, helping the team win the NBL1 North championship. In 26 games, she averaged 23.0 points, 6.0 rebounds, 3.5 assists and 1.7 steals per game.

On 29 April 2022, Woods re-signed with the Fire on a two-year deal. In the 2022–23 season, the Fire won the WNBL championship behind a 16-game winning streak. Woods saw limited court time in the grand final series, logging two minutes in game one and none in game two. In 24 games, she averaged 6.7 points, 2.1 rebounds and 2.1 assists per game.

Woods returned to the Northside Wizards for the 2023 NBL1 North season and earned NBL1 North Most Valuable Player honours and was named to the NBL1 North First Team. She went on to lead the Wizards to the NBL1 North championship behind her Finals MVP performance. It marked her third championship in 12 months. In 22 games, she averaged 24.7 points, 7.0 rebounds, 6.6 assists and 2.3 steals per game.

Woods had a breakout year with the Fire in 2023–24, playing big minutes and doubling her points per game average following injuries to Tianna Hawkins and Alice Kunek. The Fire finished on top of the ladder but lost to the Perth Lynx in the semi-finals. In 23 games, she averaged 13.8 points, 4.4 rebounds, 2.5 assists and 1.5 steals per game. On 28 February 2024, she re-signed with the Fire on a two-year deal.

Woods joined the Darwin Salties for the 2024 NBL1 North season. She was named to the NBL1 North Second Team. In 16 games, she averaged 23.7 points, 7.9 rebounds, 6.1 assists and 1.9 steals per game.

Woods entered the 2024–25 WNBL season as one of the Fire's co-captains alongside Alicia Froling and Lauren Mansfield. On 11 February 2025, she signed a further extension with the Fire until the end of the 2026–27 season. For the 2024–25 season, she was named to the All-WNBL First Team. She went on to play her 100th WNBL game in the semi-finals and helped the Fire reach the grand final. In the grand final series, Woods was held to 13 points in game one and 10 points in game two, as the Fire lost 2–0 to the Bendigo Spirit. She earned her first grand-final start during the series and averaged over 30 minutes per game.

Woods returned to the Northside Wizards for the 2025 NBL1 North season. In six games, she averaged 31.0 points, 6.5 rebounds, 5.67 assists and 2.0 steals per game.

Woods returned as co-captain of the Fire alongside Alicia Froling for the 2025–26 WNBL season. She missed time in December 2025 due to a hamstring injury. On 20 January 2026, she recorded 17 points, 13 assists and nine rebounds in an 82–76 win over the Perth Lynx. She was named the recipient of league's Golden Hands Award after averaging 6.6 assists and 1.9 steals per game, while limiting herself to just 3.2 turnovers. She also earned All-WNBL First Team honours for the second straight year. In game one of the grand final series against the Perth Lynx, Woods scored a game-high 22 points in an 88–79 win. In game two, she scored a career-high and game-high 28 points, along with eight rebounds and seven assists, in a 108–105 overtime victory over the Lynx. The win marked her second WNBL championship and was she was subsequently named WNBL Grand Final MVP.

Woods joined the Townsville Flames for the 2026 NBL1 North season, where she averaged a near triple-double and finished the regular season as the league's points and assists leader. She was subsequently named NBL1 North Most Valuable Player for the second time and earned NBL1 North All Star Five First Team honours. She helped the Flames reach the NBL1 North Grand Final series, where the team lost 2–1 to the Mackay Meteorettes. In a game one loss, Woods had a team-high 30 points. In a game two win, she had a game-high 39 points, nine rebounds, nine assists and two steals. Due to a concussion suffered in game two, she was ruled of game three. The Flames subsequently lost the decider and the series to finish as runners-up. In 16 games, she averaged 28.06 points, 8.31 rebounds, 8.69 assists and 2.13 steals per game.

On 3 November 2026, Woods recorded 24 points, eight rebounds and 10 assists in a 99–86 win over the Perth Lynx.

== National team career ==
In February 2025, Woods was named in her first Australian Opals squad. In April 2025, she was named in the Opals squad for a trans-Tasman series against New Zealand in May. She was subsequently selected for the Opals' final squad for the 2025 FIBA Women's Asia Cup in China. She helped the Opals win gold.

== Personal life ==
Woods' mother, Dana (née Fish), played basketball at the University of Idaho in the 1980s. Both her mother and her father played professional basketball. She has an older brother and sister.

Woods holds Australian and American citizenship.

In 2022, Woods spent the off-season gaining work experience as the operations manager for the Townsville Fire and also enrolled in the MBA program at James Cook University. While playing for the Darwin Salties in 2024, Woods started working part time as a project coordinator with club sponsor, Ventia.
