= Mackenzie Holmes =

American basketball player (born 2000)

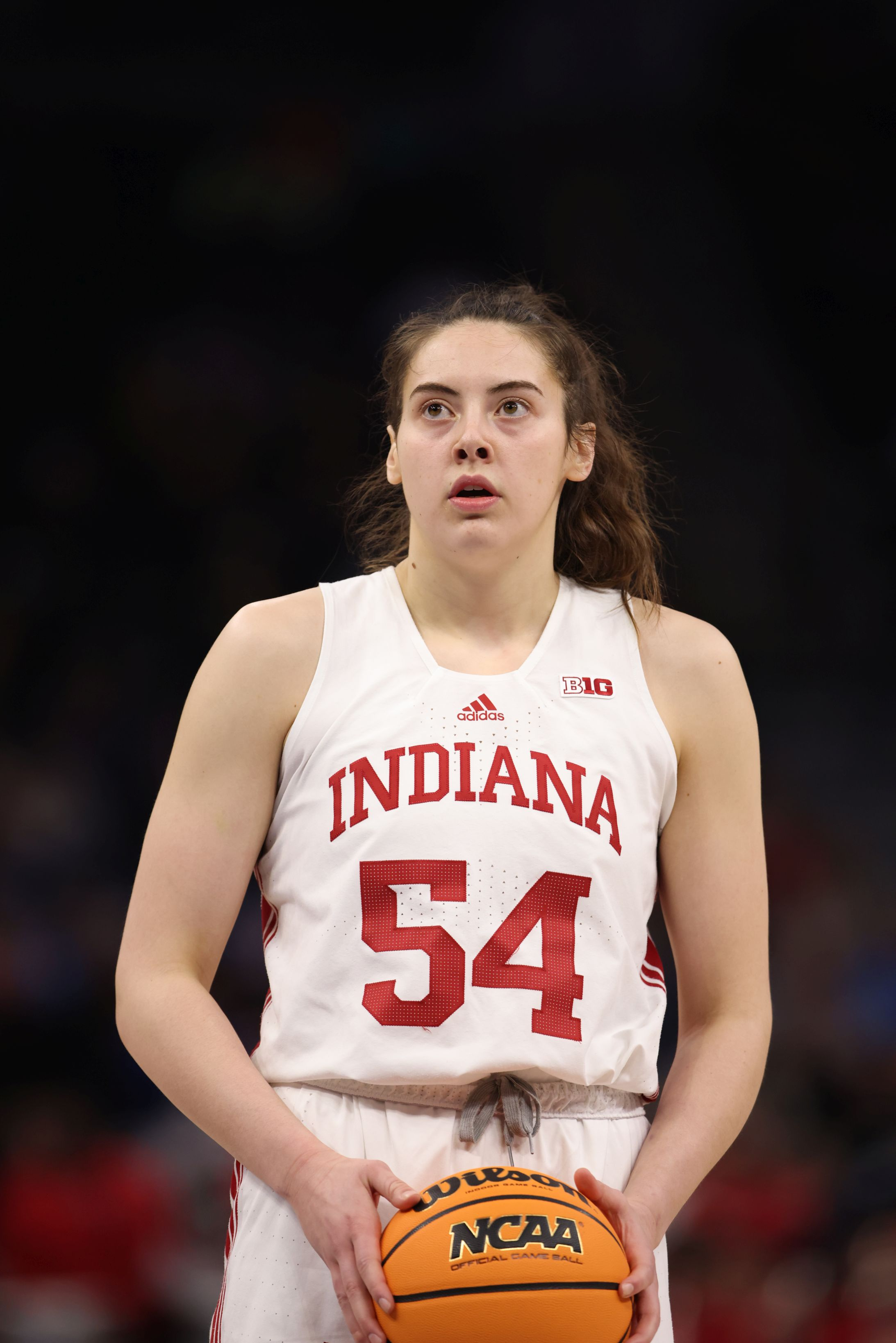
- Holmes with Indiana in 2023

No. 54 – Seattle Storm
- Position: Forward
- League: WNBA

Personal information
- Born: November 1, 2000 (age 26)
- Listed height: 6 ft 3 in (1.91 m)

Career information
- High school: Gorham (Gorham, Maine)
- College: Indiana (2019–2024)
- WNBA draft: 2024: 3rd round, 26th overall pick
- Drafted by: Seattle Storm
- Playing career: 2025–present

Career history
- 2025–present: Seattle Storm
- 2025–2026: Geelong Venom
- 2025–2026: Henan Phoenix

Career highlights
- All-WNBL First Team (2026); Second-team All-American – USBWA (2024); Third-team All-American – AP (2024); Unanimous first-team All-American (2023); First-team All-American – AP, USBWA (2023); WBCA Coaches' All-American (2023); 3× First-team All-Big Ten (2021, 2023, 2024); Second-team All-Big Ten (2022); Big Ten Defensive Player of the Year (2023); 2× Big Ten All-Defensive Team (2023, 2024); 2× Big Ten All-Defensive Team – Media (2021, 2023); Big Ten All-Freshman Team (2020)
- Stats at Basketball Reference

Mackenzie Holmes (born November 1, 2000) is an American professional basketball player for the Seattle Storm of the WNBA. She played college basketball for the Indiana Hoosiers. She was selected 26th overall by the Storm in the 2024 WNBA Draft.

== High school career ==
Holmes played basketball for Gorham High School in Gorham, Maine. She won state titles in each of her first two years. As a senior, Holmes averaged 30.1 points, 16.7 rebounds and 3.9 blocks per game, and was named Maine Gatorade Player of the Year. She was a three-time Southwestern Maine Activities Association Player of the Year. Holmes left as her school's all-time leader in points, rebounds and blocks. Rated a five-star recruit by ESPN, she committed to playing college basketball for Indiana over offers from Iowa State, Boston College, Belmont and James Madison.

== College career ==
As a freshman at Indiana, Holmes averaged 10.8 points and 5.2 rebounds per game, making the Big Ten All-Freshman Team. She set the program record for field goal percentage (63.4). Holmes entered a starting role in her sophomore season. She averaged 17.8 points and 7.6 rebounds while leading the Big Ten with three blocks per game. Holmes was named first-team All-Big Ten, made the media All-Defensive Team and became the first player in program history to earn Associated Press All-American honorable mention. As a junior, she averaged 15.2 points and seven rebounds per game, earning second-team All-Big Ten recognition.

On December 29, 2022, Holmes posted 32 points and 12 rebounds in an 83–78 loss to Michigan State. On February 13, 2023, she recorded a career-high 33 points in an 83–59 win over Ohio State. Holmes led Indiana to the Big Ten regular season title and its most wins in program history. As a senior, she averaged 22.3 points, 7.3 rebounds and 1.9 blocks per game, and set program records in field goal percentage (68.0) and field goals made (281). Holmes was named a unanimous first-team All-American, Big Ten Defensive Player of the Year and first-team All-Big Ten. She opted to return to Indiana for her fifth season of eligibility.

== Professional career ==
On April 15, 2024, Holmes was selected in the 2024 WNBA draft as the 26th overall pick by the Seattle Storm. She underwent knee surgery in May and was unavailable for the 2024 season.

On February 12, 2025, the Storm signed Holmes to a rookie contract. On May 12, she was waived by the Storm. She was re-signed by the Storm on June 16. She made her debut on June 17, in a 98–67 win against the Los Angeles Sparks, playing 5 minutes off the bench.

On September 10, 2025, Holmes signed with the Geelong Venom of the Women's National Basketball League (WNBL) in Australia for the 2025–26 season. She was named to the All-WNBL First Team.

== Career statistics ==
Legend
| GP | Games played | GS | Games started | MPG | Minutes per game | FG% | Field goal percentage |
| 3P% | 3-point field goal percentage | FT% | Free throw percentage | RPG | Rebounds per game | APG | Assists per game |
| SPG | Steals per game | BPG | Blocks per game | TO | Turnovers per game | PPG | Points per game |
| **Bold** | Career high | * | Led Division I | ° | Led the league | ‡ | WNBA record |

=== WNBA ===
==== Regular season ====
Stats current through the 2026 season

WNBA regular season statistics
| Year | Team | GP | GS | MPG | FG% | 3P% | FT% | RPG | APG | SPG | BPG | TO | PPG |
|---|---|---|---|---|---|---|---|---|---|---|---|---|---|
| 2025 | Seattle | 10 | 0 | 5.8 | .714 | .000 | .000 | 0.9 | 0.2 | 0.5 | 0.1 | 0.0 | 1.0 |
| 2026 | Seattle | 29 | 0 | 10.0 | .554 | .462 | .706 | 2.9 | 0.6 | 0.7 | 0.2 | 0.4 | 2.8 |
| **Career** | 2 years, 1 team | 39 | 0 | 8.9 | .571 | .462 | .706 | 2.4 | 0.5 | 0.6 | 0.2 | 0.3 | 2.3 |

==== Playoffs ====
WNBA playoff statistics
| Year | Team | GP | GS | MPG | FG% | 3P% | FT% | RPG | APG | SPG | BPG | TO | PPG |
|---|---|---|---|---|---|---|---|---|---|---|---|---|---|
| 2025 | Seattle | 1 | 0 | 5.0 | .000 | .000 | .000 | 1.0 | 0.0 | 0.0 | 0.0 | 0.0 | 0.0 |
| **Career** | 1 year, 1 team | 1 | 0 | 5.0 | .000 | .000 | .000 | 1.0 | 0.0 | 0.0 | 0.0 | 0.0 | 0.0 |

=== College ===
Legend
| GP | Games played | GS | Games started | MPG | Minutes per game | RPG | Rebounds per game |
| APG | Assists per game | SPG | Steals per game | BPG | Blocks per game | PPG | Points per game |
| TO | Turnovers per game | FG% | Field-goal percentage | 3P% | 3-point field-goal percentage | FT% | Free-throw percentage |
| **Bold** | Career best | ° | League leader |

| Year | Team | GP | GS | MPG | FG% | 3P% | FT% | RPG | APG | SPG | BPG | TO | PPG |
|---|---|---|---|---|---|---|---|---|---|---|---|---|---|
| 2019–20 | Indiana | **32** | 2 | 19.0 | 63.4 | 0.0 | 65.1 | 5.2 | 0.3 | 0.7 | 0.8 | **1.3** | 10.8 |
| 2020–21 | Indiana | 27 | 27 | 30.4 | 60.7 | 0.0 | 78.4 | **7.6** | 0.4 | 0.9 | **3.0** | 1.6 | 17.8 |
| 2021–22 | Indiana | 25 | 25 | 28.5 | 60.0 | **40.0** | **80.8** | 7.0 | 0.6 | 0.5 | 1.7° | 1.6 | 15.2 |
| 2022–23 | Indiana | 31 | **31** | **30.7** | **68.0** | 22.2 | 71.5 | 7.3 | 1.2 | **1.1** | 1.9° | 2.0 | **22.3** |
| 2023–24 | Indiana | **32** | **31** | 28.2 | 65.0° | 16.7 | 71.6 | 6.8 | **1.4** | 0.9 | 1.6° | 2.4 | 19.8 |
| Career | | 147 | 116 | 27.2 | 63.9 | 23.8 | 72.9 | 6.7 | 0.8 | 0.8 | 1.8 | 1.8 | 17.2 |
Statistics retrieved from Sports-Reference.
