= Alex Wilson (basketball) =

Australian basketball player (born 1994)

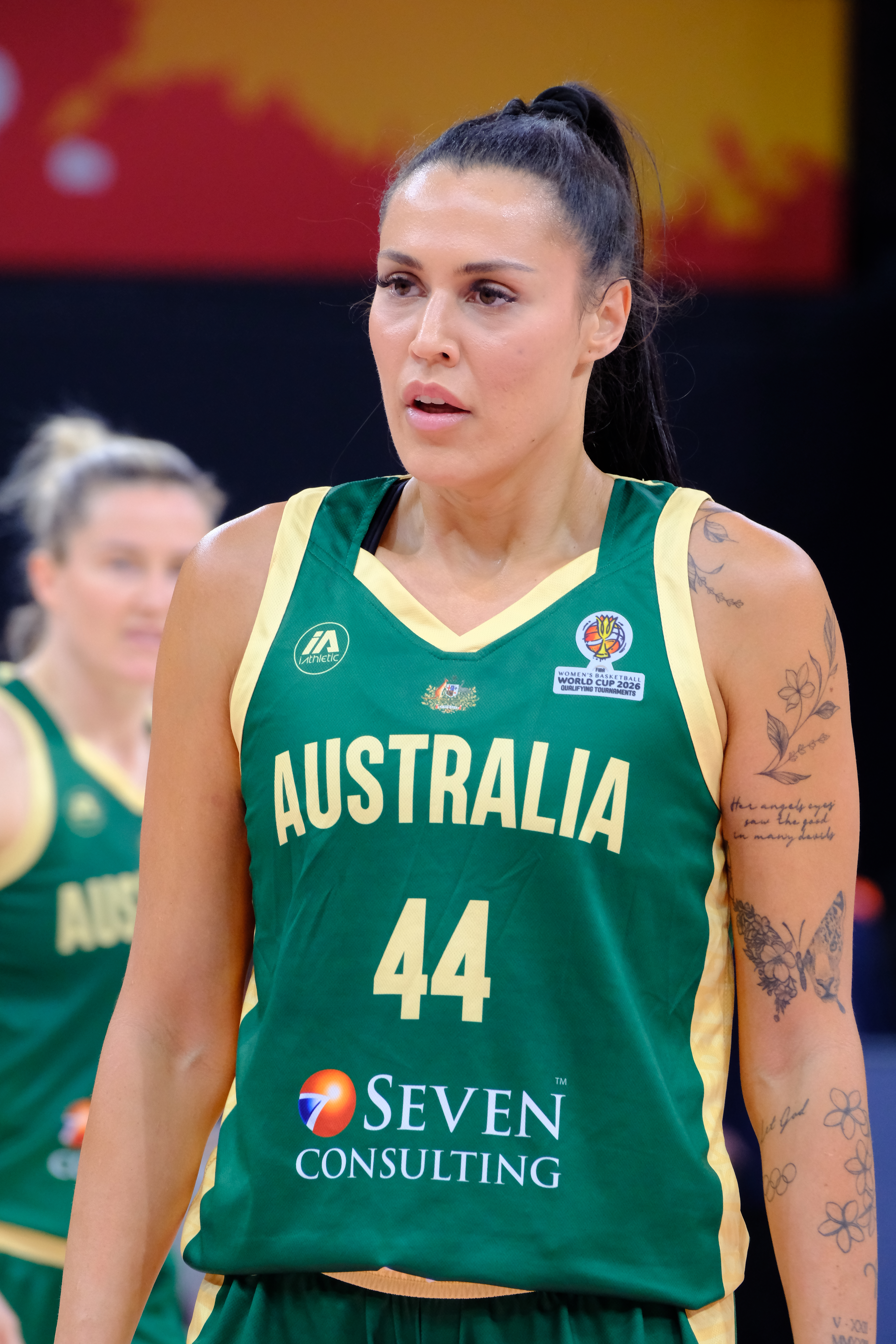
- Wilson in 2026

Sydney Flames
- Position: Guard
- League: WNBL

Personal information
- Born: 21 March 1994 (age 32) Murray Bridge, South Australia, Australia
- Listed height: 175 cm (5 ft 9 in)

Career information
- Playing career: 2010–present

Career history
- 2010–2011: Adelaide Lightning
- 2011–2013: Eastern Mavericks
- 2013–2015: Townsville Fire
- 2014–2016: Launceston Tornadoes
- 2015–2020: Sydney Uni Flames
- 2017: Eastern Mavericks
- 2018: Launceston Tornadoes
- 2019: Diamond Valley Eagles
- 2020: Adelaide Lightning
- 2021–2023: Norwood Flames
- 2021–2024: Bendigo Spirit
- 2024: Bendigo Braves
- 2024–2026: Perth Lynx
- 2025: Mandurah Magic
- 2026: Washington Mystics
- 2026–present: Sydney Flames

Career highlights
- 2× WNBL champion (2015, 2017); 2× All-WNBL First Team (2025, 2026); WNBL Rookie of the Year (2014); NBL1 Central champion (2023); NBL1 Central Grand Final MVP (2023); NBL1 National Finals All-Star Five (2023); Premier League MVP (2017); 4× Premier League / NBL1 Central All-Star Five (2017, 2021–2023); 2× All-SEABL Team (2016, 2018); 2× FIBA 3x3 Asia Cup MVP (2024, 2025)
- Stats at WNBA.com
- Stats at Basketball Reference
Medals
Representing Australia
Women's basketball
Asia Cup
Gold medal – first place	2025 China
Summer Universiade
Gold medal – first place	2017 Taiwan	Team
FIBA U19 World Championship
Bronze medal – third place	2013 Lithuania	Team
Women's 3x3 basketball
FIBA 3x3 World Cup
Bronze medal – third place	2023 Vienna	Team
Commonwealth Games
Bronze medal – third place	2022 Birmingham	3x3
Asia Cup
Gold medal – first place	2024 Singapore	Team
Gold medal – first place	2025 Singapore	Team

Alex Brooke "Ally" Wilson (born 21 March 1994) is an Australian professional basketball player for the Sydney Flames of the Women's National Basketball League (WNBL).

== Early life ==
Wilson was born in Murray Bridge, South Australia. She was introduced to basketball through her father who played professionally.

== Career ==
=== WNBL ===
Wilson debuted in the Women's National Basketball League (WNBL) in the 2010–11 season for the Adelaide Lightning. Her next stint came with the Townsville Fire in 2013–14 and 2014–15, where she won WNBL Rookie of the Year in 2013–14 and a championship in 2014–15.

In 2015, Wilson joined the Sydney Uni Flames. She played five seasons for the Flames and won a championship in 2016–17. She overcame three knee surgeries during the early part of her career.

Wilson joined the Adelaide Lightning for the 2020 WNBL Hub season in Queensland.

For the 2021–22, 2022–23 and 2023–24 seasons, Wilson played for the Bendigo Spirit.

On 11 July 2024, Wilson signed with the Perth Lynx for the 2024–25 WNBL season. She was named to the All-WNBL First Team and earned Lynx Club MVP. In game one of the Lynx's semi-finals series against the Townsville Fire, Wilson scored a career-high 32 points and had nine assists in a 92–87 loss.

On 8 July 2025, Wilson re-signed with the Lynx for the 2025–26 WNBL season. She missed the start of the season after injuring her knee while representing Australia at the Asia Cup and needed surgery. In November 2025, she began wearing a face mask to protect her broken nose. That same month, she played her 250th WNBL game. She was named to the All-WNBL First Team for the second straight year. She helped the Lynx reach the WNBL grand final series, where they lost 2–0 to the Townsville Fire despite her 13 points, nine assists and nine rebounds in game two.

On 4 May 2026, Wilson signed a two-year deal with the Sydney Flames, returning to the franchise for a second stint. After making two appearances to start the 2026–27 season, she was ruled out for a month with a knee injury on 7 November 2026.

=== WNBA ===
On 27 February 2025, Wilson signed a training camp deal with the Chicago Sky of the Women's National Basketball Association (WNBA). On 11 May, she was waived by the Sky.

In April 2026, Wilson joined the Washington Mystics for training camp, going on to earn a full roster spot for the 2026 WNBA season. She was waived on 2 June.

=== State Leagues ===
Between 2011 and 2013, Wilson played in the Central ABL for the Eastern Mavericks. Between 2014 and 2016, she played for the Launceston Tornadoes in the South East Australian Basketball League (SEABL). She returned to the Eastern Mavericks in 2017 and earned Premier League MVP and All-Star Five. She had another season with the Launceston Tornadoes in the SEABL in 2018. She won All-SEABL Team honours in 2016 and 2018. In 2019, she played for the Diamond Valley Eagles in the inaugural NBL1 season.

Between 2021 and 2023, Wilson played for the Norwood Flames in the NBL1 Central. She earned All-Star Five honours all three years. She helped the Flames win the championship in 2023 behind her grand final MVP performance of 23 points, 16 rebounds and six assists in an 80–65 win over the Sturt Sabres. She went on to earn All-Star Five honours at the 2023 NBL1 National Finals.

Wilson joined the Bendigo Braves of the NBL1 South for the 2024 season. She averaged 16 points, 7.2 rebounds and 4.8 assists in 12 games, missing a large part of the season due to the Olympics.

Wilson joined the Mandurah Magic of the NBL1 West for the 2025 season. She played three games for the Magic.

== National team ==
Wilson represented Australia at the 2012 FIBA Oceania Under-18 Championship and 2013 FIBA Under-19 World Championship.

In March 2024, Wilson helped the Australia 3x3 team win gold at the 2024 FIBA 3x3 Asia Cup. She was named tournament MVP. She was subsequently named in Australia's first 3x3 Olympic team for the 2024 Paris Olympics.

In March 2025, Wilson helped Australia win back-to-back gold medals at the 2025 FIBA 3x3 Asia Cup. She was named tournament MVP for the second straight year. In May 2025, Wilson was named in the Opals squad for the 2025 FIBA Women's Asia Cup in China. In June 2025, she was named in the Australia 3x3 team for the 2025 FIBA 3x3 World Cup in Mongolia. She helped the Opals win gold at the Asia Cup in July.

In July 2026, Wilson was named in the final Opals squad for the 2026 FIBA Women's Basketball World Cup.

== Personal life ==
Wilson's father, Bill, is a Ngarrindjeri man.

As of February 2026, Wilson's partner is fellow basketball player and Perth Lynx teammate Amy Atwell.
