= Basketball Northern Territory =

Australian sports governing body

- Sport: Basketball
- Jurisdiction: Northern Territory
- Abbreviation: Basketball NT; BNT
- Founded: 1948; 78 years ago
- Affiliation: Basketball Australia
- Headquarters: Darwin Basketball Stadium, Marrara, Northern Territory
- Chairperson: Jane Bochmann
- CEO: Mitch Duhig

Official website
- nt.basketball

Basketball Northern Territory (BNT) is the governing body of basketball in the Northern Territory, Australia.

BNT was founded as Northern Territory Basketball Association (NTBA) in 1948. Basketball was administered by NTBA until 1963, when its Constitution was amended and the Darwin Amateur Basketball Association (DABA) was formed. The lease on Darwin's main basketball court at Daly Street was transferred from NTBA to DABA in 1974. In the 1980s DABA became known as Darwin Basketball Association (DBA) and in the 1990s NTBA became known as Basketball Northern Territory.

In 2022, the NBL1 North had a club from Darwin – the Darwin Salties – represented for the first time under the joint management of DBA and BNT. It saw the NBL1 become the first Australian sport league to have clubs based in and playing out of every state and territory in Australia. After the demise of the Salties in 2024 following mounting financial losses for DBA, the association was dissolved and absorbed into BNT in December 2025. DBA subsequently became known as the Darwin Basketball League and Ventia Stadium in Marrara transferred from DBA to BNT.

== Major affiliated associations ==
| Association | Home base | Location | Established |
|---|---|---|---|
| Alice Springs Basketball Association | Alice Springs Basketball Stadium | Alice Springs | |
| Darwin Basketball Association | Darwin Basketball Stadium | Darwin | 1963 |
| Palmerston and Regional Basketball Association | Palmerston Recreation Centre | Palmerston | 2014 |

== See also ==
- Sport in the Northern Territory
