= Maddison Rocci =

Australian basketball player (born 1998)

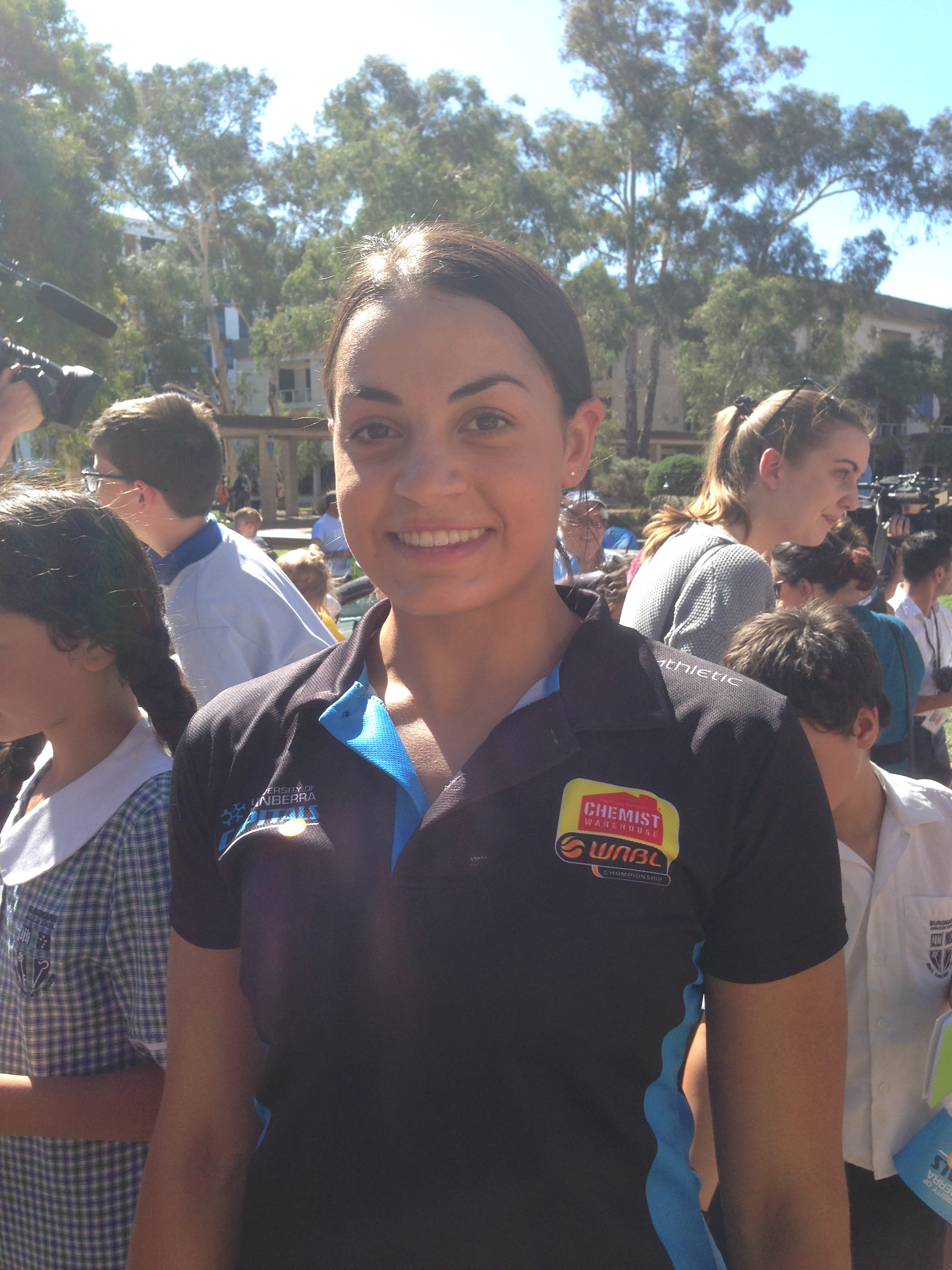
- Rocci with the Canberra Capitals in 2019

No. 5 – Geelong Venom
- Position: Guard
- League: WNBL

Personal information
- Born: 1 June 1998 (age 28) Melbourne, Victoria, Australia
- Listed height: 169 cm (5 ft 7 in)

Career information
- High school: Lake Ginninderra College (Canberra, ACT)
- Playing career: 2015–present

Career history
- 2015: Geelong Supercats
- 2016–2017: BA Centre of Excellence
- 2017–2020: Canberra Capitals
- 2018: Diamond Valley Eagles
- 2019–2020: USC Rip City
- 2021: Southern Districts Spartans
- 2021–2026: Southside Flyers
- 2022: USC Rip City
- 2023: South West Metro Pirates
- 2024–2026: Keilor Thunder
- 2026–present: Geelong Venom

Career highlights
- 3× WNBL champion (2019, 2019–20, 2024); All-WNBL Second Team (2020); QSL Most Valuable Player (2020); NBL1 South All First Team (2025); All-NBL1 South Second Team (2026)
- Stats at WNBA.com
- Stats at Basketball Reference
Medals
Representing Australia
Basketball
Asia Cup
Bronze medal – third place	2023 Australia
FIBA U18 Oceania Championship
Gold medal – first place	2016 Fiji	Team

Maddison Louise Rocci (born 1 June 1998) is an Australian professional basketball player for the Geelong Venom of the Women's National Basketball League (WNBL).

== Early life ==
Rocci was born in Melbourne, Victoria, in the suburb of East Melbourne.

While at the Australian Institute of Sport (AIS) in Canberra, Rocci attended Lake Ginninderra College.

== Professional career ==
=== WNBL ===
Rocci joined the Canberra Capitals of the Women's National Basketball League (WNBL) for the 2017–18 season. She continued with the Capitals in 2018–19 and 2019–20, winning championships both years. She played a fourth season for the Capitals in the 2020 WNBL Hub season in Queensland.

For the 2021–22 WNBL season, Rocci joined the Southside Flyers. She continued with the Flyers in 2022–23, 2023–24, 2024–25 and 2025–26. She parted ways with the Flyers after five seasons.

On 5 May 2026, Rocci signed with the Geelong Venom for the 2026–27 WNBL season.

=== WNBA ===
Rocci had a training camp and pre-season stint with the Toronto Tempo in the lead up to the 2026 WNBA season.

=== State leagues ===
Rocci played in the South East Australian Basketball League (SEABL) for several teams between 2015 and 2018. She began with the Geelong Supercats in 2015, then played for the BA Centre of Excellence in 2016 and 2017, before joining the Diamond Valley Eagles in 2018.

Rocci joined the USC Rip City of the Queensland Basketball League (QBL) for the 2019 season. She continued with the USC Rip City in the 2020 Queensland State League (QSL) season, where she won QSL MVP honours after averaging 32.5 points, 10.3 rebounds and 3.9 assists in 10 games.

Rocci joined the Southern Districts Spartans of the NBL1 North for the 2021 season. She returned to the USC Rip City for the 2022 NBL1 North season. For the 2023 NBL1 North season, she joined the South West Metro Pirates.

Rocci joined the Keilor Thunder of the NBL1 South for the 2024 season. She returned to the Thunder for the 2025 NBL1 South season. On 25 April 2025, she recorded a triple-double with 18 points, 11 rebounds and 10 assists in a 76–50 win over the Hobart Chargers. On 24 May 2025, she recorded a triple-double with 42 points, 12 rebounds and 10 assists in a 92–86 overtime win over the Kilsyth Cobras. She was named NBL1 South All First Team.

Rocci re-joined the Keilor Thunder for the 2026 NBL1 South season. On 28 March 2026, she recorded a triple-double with 37 points, 10 rebounds and 10 assists in a 79–78 win over the Knox Raiders. On 10 May, she recorded 21 points, 10 rebounds and 11 assists in a 97–52 win over the Hobart Chargers. She was named All-NBL1 South Second Team.

== National team career ==
Rocci made her international debut at the 2014 FIBA Under-17 World Championship in the Czech Republic with the Sapphires, where they placed fifth. She then made her debut with the Gems at the 2016 Oceania Championship in Fiji, where Australia took home the gold. Rocci then continued on with the Gems at the 2017 FIBA Under-19 World Championship in Italy, where the Gems placed sixth.

In May 2025, Rocci was named in the Opals squad for the 2025 FIBA Women's Asia Cup in China.
