= Basketball Tasmania =

Governing body of basketball in Tasmania

- Sport: Basketball
- Jurisdiction: Tasmania
- Abbreviation: Basketball TAS; BTAS
- Founded: 1946
- Affiliation: Basketball Australia
- Headquarters: Tasmania, Australia
- Chairperson: Trudy Pearce
- CEO: Ben Smith

Official website
- www.basketballtasmania.com.au

Basketball Tasmania (BTAS) is the governing body for the sport of basketball in the state of Tasmania, Australia. It is responsible for overseeing the development, promotion, and administration of basketball throughout Tasmania. The organisation is affiliated with Basketball Australia and works with regional associations, clubs, and schools to foster basketball participation at all levels, from grassroots to elite competition.

== History ==
Basketball Tasmania was established in 1946 to coordinate and manage the growing interest in basketball across the state. Since its formation, BTAS has played a key role in developing basketball infrastructure, fostering player development, and organising competitions across Tasmania. Over the years, it has expanded its reach to include programs for youth, women, and people with disabilities, ensuring basketball remains accessible to all Tasmanians.

In 1949, Hobart hosted the Australian Basketball Championship for the British Standard Trophy for the first time since its inception in 1946. The event, held from 22 to 26 August at Hobart City Hall, featured teams from Queensland, New South Wales, South Australia, Victoria, and Tasmania. It marked the public's first opportunity to witness top-level men's indoor basketball in Tasmania. The championship was opened by Governor Hugh Binney, with Tasmania's Maurice Jory appointed team captain and Ralph Mollross as vice-captain.

In 2022, Macca's On Your Team partnered with Basketball Tasmania to deliver basketball camps for kids aged 9 to 14 during the school holidays. The camps, held in Hobart, Launceston and Devonport on 27 and 28 April, focused on skill development and were led by Basketball Tasmania's high-performance athletes and staff. This initiative was part of McDonald's ongoing efforts to support grassroots sports and promote physical activity among children.

Basketball Tasmania unveiled its First Nations logo, designed by Guy Grey and Carly Grey, ahead of the 2024 Under 16 National Championships. The logo features nine basketballs representing Tasmania's nine Aboriginal nations and their connection to water.

== Governance ==
Basketball Tasmania operates under a board of directors, with input from various regional basketball associations. The organisation is led by a CEO and has a team dedicated to managing competitions, development programs, and high-performance pathways for players and coaches.

== Competitions ==
Basketball Tasmania organises and oversees several key competitions in the state, including:

- Tasmanian State League (TSL) – The premier senior basketball competition in the state, which features teams from across Tasmania.
- Tasmanian Junior Basketball League (TJBL) – A league for youth teams that provides young players with opportunities to compete and develop their skills.
- School Championships – BTAS also organises school competitions that allow students from across the state to compete in basketball.

Additionally, BTAS supports teams competing in national leagues and tournaments, including junior and senior state representative teams that participate in the Australian Junior Championships and other Basketball Australia-run competitions.

== Development programs ==
Basketball Tasmania is committed to growing the game at all levels. The organisation runs several development programs, including:

- Aussie Hoops – A national introductory program aimed at children aged 5–10, designed to teach basic basketball skills in a fun and inclusive environment.
- High Performance Program (HPP) – BTAS's pathway for identifying and developing talented athletes to compete at the highest levels of the sport, including representing Tasmania in national competitions.
- Coaching and Referee Development – Programs aimed at upskilling coaches and referees throughout the state, ensuring that participants have access to high-quality coaching and officiating.

== Tasmania JackJumpers ==
The Tasmania JackJumpers, established in 2020, are Tasmania's professional basketball team, competing in the National Basketball League (NBL). While the JackJumpers operate independently from BTAS, the two organisations collaborate to support basketball development in Tasmania, with the JackJumpers providing inspiration and opportunities for aspiring players across the state.

The JackJumpers have also played a significant role in promoting basketball at the grassroots level through various community initiatives. In May 2024, following their successful 2023–24 NBL season, the JackJumpers took their Championship Trophy on a tour of northern and north-western Tasmania, engaging with local fans and communities. This initiative brought the excitement of professional basketball to regional areas, with the team visiting schools, basketball clubs, and local events, aiming to inspire the next generation of players. The tour highlighted the connection between Tasmania's regional communities and the state’s professional basketball team.

== Regional associations ==
Basketball Tasmania works with regional associations across Tasmania, including:

- North West Basketball Union
- Southern Basketball Association
- Basketball South Tasmania

These associations are responsible for organising competitions, events, and development programs at a local level, ensuring basketball is accessible across the state.

== Facilities ==
BTAS oversees and supports the development of basketball facilities throughout Tasmania, with major venues including:

- Elphin Sports Centre (Launceston)
- Kingborough Sports Centre (Kingston)
- Hobart Netball and Sports Centre (Hobart)
- Ulverstone Sports and Leisure Centre (Ulverstone)
- Burnie Basketball Stadium (Burnie)

== Community involvement ==
Basketball Tasmania plays a significant role in the community by promoting inclusion and participation through various programs. BTAS focuses on ensuring that basketball is available to people of all ages, genders, and abilities. This includes specific programs for Indigenous Australians and people with disabilities.

== Controversies ==
In December 2018, the Hobart Chargers, just months after winning the SEABL championship, suspended operations following a conflict with Basketball Tasmania over entry conditions into the new Victorian Elite League. Club president and former Tasmanian premier David Bartlett criticised Basketball Tasmania, claiming their demands would strip the Chargers of their independence and control over revenue and junior programs, leading to the team's withdrawal from the 2019 season.
