= Basketball Australia =

Sports governing body

- Sport: Basketball
- Jurisdiction: Australia
- Abbreviation: BA
- Founded: 1939; 87 years ago
- Affiliation: FIBA
- Affiliation date: 1949; 77 years ago
- Regional affiliation: FIBA Oceania
- Headquarters: State Basketball Centre, Wantirna South, Victoria
- Chairman: John Carey
- CEO: Matt Scriven

Official website
- australia.basketball
- (Australia)

Basketball Australia (BA), officially registered as BA Limited, is the governing body for basketball in Australia. Established in 1939, BA is a not-for-profit organisation responsible for overseeing basketball at all levels in Australia.

Basketball Australia is a member of FIBA and organises international competitions for Australian teams. It also manages the Centre of Excellence at the Australian Institute of Sport (AIS) in Canberra.

== History ==
=== Early development ===
Basketball in Australia traces its roots back to the early 20th century. The earliest recorded game happened on 23 February 1897, when a team from the Our Boys Institute would play against a team from the YMCA. It rapidly grew in the following years and became quite popular even for women to play. Victoria was the first state to establish a basketball association in 1931, known as the Victorian Basketball Association (VBA).

=== Formation of a National Body ===
In 1939, the National Federation of Basketball was formed, later becoming the Amateur Basketball Union of Australia. This body established objectives to promote the game, coordinate national championships, and manage Australian representative teams. However, it did not become fully effective until 1946, when the first Australian Championships were held.

In 1949, Australia became the 52nd member of the International Basketball Federation (FIBA). This marked a significant step in aligning Australian basketball with international standards, including adopting uniform rules and establishing player eligibility criteria.

=== Evolution of coaching ===
The development of basketball coaching in Australia was influenced by international figures and techniques. Ivor Burge, who studied physical education in the United States, introduced strategies like the zone defense during the 1930s. The arrival of American servicemen during World War II and European migrants post-war further diversified playing styles, with contributions from figures like Leon Baltrunis and De Lyle Condie.

Prominent Australian coaches such as Ken Watson and Lindsay Gaze were instrumental in advancing the game. Watson's use of the shuffle offence during the 1956 Olympics in Melbourne and Gaze's long-standing Olympic coaching career (1972–1984) exemplified Australia's growing basketball expertise.

=== International influence and growth ===
By the 1960s, exchange programs with U.S. high schools and colleges helped Australian teams adopt advanced techniques. Visits from American and European teams, such as the Maccabi Tel Aviv and the Cibona Club of Zagreb, further elevated competition standards. The inclusion of prominent players like Andrew Gaze and Michelle Timms in international leagues marked Australia's arrival on the global stage.

=== Modern era ===
Basketball in Australia reached its peak popularity during the 1990s when the NBL became a must see sports competition both in person and on television. Junior participation grew alongside the league's boom in popularity. Despite a softening popularity in the 2000s to early 2010's, junior participation remained strong. The NBL returned to main stream popularity by the 2020s.

The transition to the modern era saw the rebranding of the national governing body to Basketball Australia in 1996, aligning with professional standards and expanding its role in managing domestic leagues like the NBL and WNBL.

The Opals national team consistently won medals throughout the 1990s through to now, including their best international finish winning Gold at the 2006 FIBA World Championship for Women.

The Boomers regularly finished high in Mens international tournaments but did not achieve medal success until winning Bronze at the 2020 Tokyo Olympics.

From 2017 onwards, Basketball Australia national teams begun competing in FIBA Asia competitions in attempt to increase the skill level of FIBA Asia and provide a more challenging pathway for world cup qualifying, due to Australia and New Zealand's dominance in FIBA Oceania. The Boomers have won gold in every FIBA Asia Cup since.

== State and Territory members ==
Basketball Australia operates in partnership with its State and Territory associations, which govern and promote basketball at regional and community levels. These members are:

- Basketball ACT
- Basketball New South Wales
- Basketball Northern Territory
- Basketball Queensland
- Basketball South Australia
- Basketball Tasmania
- Basketball Victoria
- Basketball Western Australia

These associations play a central role in nurturing local talent, organising competitions, and implementing Basketball Australia's policies at the grassroots level.

== National Teams ==
Team	Competition	World Cup	Year	Olympics	Year	Commonwealth Games	Year
Boomers	Men	4th	2019	4th	2016	1st	2018
Opals	Women	2nd	2018	5th	2016	1st	2018
Rollers	Wheelchair Men	3rd	2018	6th	2016	N/A	
Gliders	Wheelchair Women	9th	2018	DNP	2016	N/A	
Emus	U-19 Men	9th	2019	DNP	2014 (Note: The 2014 Summer Youth Olympics was the last in which full-court basketball was contested. From 2018 forward, the only form of basketball contested is the half-court 3x3 variant.)	N/A	
Gems	U-19 Women	2nd	2019	DNP	2014	N/A	
Crocs	U-17 Men	6th	2018	N/A			
Sapphires	U-17 Women	3rd	2018	N/A			
Gangurrus Men	3x3 Men	19th	2026	DNP	2024	2nd	2022
Gangurrus Women	3x3 Women	2nd	2026	5th	2024	3rd	2022
Wombats Men	3x3 Wheelchair Men					TBD	2026
Wombats Women	3x3 Wheelchair Women					TBD	2026

Each national team and their performance at the most recent international events are listed above.

== Leagues ==
=== Men ===
Level	Leagues				
1	National Basketball League; 10 teams (1 from New Zealand)				
2	NBL1 Central; 10 teams	NBL1 East; 16 teams	NBL1 North; 16 teams	NBL1 South; 19 teams	NBL1 West; 14 teams
3	Basketball SA State Championships; Division 1	Basketball NSW Waratah Leagues; Multiple Conferences	Basketball QLD State Championships; Multiple Competitions	Big V 8 teams	WABL Championship; 15 teams
4	BSASC; Division 2	Basketball NSW Waratah Leagues; Multiple Conferences	Basketball QLD State Championships; Multiple Competitions	Big V 8 teams	WABL Championship; 15 teams

==== Competition structure ====
- There is no promotion and relegation between the professional National Basketball League (NBL) and semi-professional NBL1 competitions.
- The NBL consists of franchises while NBL1 leagues and the various level 3 competitions consist of community based clubs.
- The NBL runs during the Australian summer sports calendar while NBL1 runs in its off season. Lower skilled players from NBL franchises often play in NBL1 to continue their growth and increase their salary income.
- Some clubs field teams in both their region's NBL1 league and Level 3 competitions, with their players assigned to a league based on skill level. The WABL particularly positions itself as a league for the reserve and bench players of NBL1 West teams.

=== Women ===
Level	Leagues					
1	Women's National Basketball League; 8 teams					
2	Big V 8 teams	NBL1 Central; 10 teams	NBL1 East; 16 teams	NBL1 North; 16 teams	NBL1 South; 19 teams	NBL1 West; 13 teams

=== Interschool ===
Australian Schools Championships

== Partnerships ==
Basketball Australia maintains partnerships with key organisations to enhance the sport's reach and impact. Notable partnerships include:

- A collaboration with the Japan Basketball Association since 2018, focusing on international knowledge exchange.
- A multi-year sponsorship deal with Ford Australia announced in 2023, featuring the Ford logo on national team jerseys.

== See also ==
- Australia men's national basketball team
- Australia women's national basketball team
- List of Australian NBA players
- Women's National Basketball League
- Australian Schools Championships

== Sources ==
- Jack Small - papers concerning Basketball Australia (Australian Basketball Federation Incorporated), 1929-1991, 1929
- Hillman, Robert (2004), Basketball, Echidna, ISBN 978-1-74070-766-4
