= Anneli Maley =

Australian basketball player (born 1998)

- Maley in 2026

No. 24 – Perth Lynx
- Position: Forward
- League: WNBL

Personal information
- Born: 1 September 1998 (age 28) Melbourne, Victoria, Australia
- Listed height: 185 cm (6 ft 1 in)

Career information
- High school: Eltham (Melbourne, Victoria); Box Hill Senior (Melbourne, Victoria)
- College: Oregon (2017–2018); TCU (2018–2019)
- Playing career: 2014–present

Career history
- 2014–2015: BA Centre of Excellence
- 2016–2017: Adelaide Lightning
- 2017: Dandenong Rangers
- 2019: Diamond Valley Eagles
- 2019–2020: Southside Flyers
- 2020: Sydney Uni Flames
- 2021–2023: Eltham Wildcats
- 2021–2023: Bendigo Spirit
- 2022: Chicago Sky
- 2023–present: Perth Lynx
- 2024–2026: Perth Redbacks
- 2026: Hebei Win Power
- 2026: Phoenix Mercury
- 2026: New York Liberty

Career highlights
- WNBA Commissioner's Cup winner (2026); WNBL Most Valuable Player (2022); 2× All-WNBL First Team (2022, 2026); All-WNBL Second Team (2025); 2× All-NBL1 West First Team (2024, 2025); NBL1 West scoring champion (2024); NBL1 Youth Player of the Year (2019)
- Stats at WNBA.com
- Stats at Basketball Reference
Medals
Women's basketball
Representing Australia
FIBA World Cup
Bronze medal – third place	2022 Australia
Asia Cup
Bronze medal – third place	2023 Australia
FIBA Under-19 World Championship
Bronze medal – third place	2015 Australia	U-19 Team
FIBA Oceania Junior Championship
Gold medal – first place	2013 Australia	U-17 Team
Gold medal – first place	2014 Fiji	U-19 Team
Women's 3x3 basketball
FIBA 3x3 World Cup
Bronze medal – third place	2023 Vienna	Team
Asia Cup
Gold medal – first place	2024 Singapore	Team
Gold medal – first place	2025 Singapore	Team

Anneli Maley (born 1 September 1998) is an Australian professional basketball player for the Perth Lynx of the Women's National Basketball League (WNBL). She made her WNBL debut in 2016 and then spent two seasons in the United States playing college basketball for the Oregon Ducks and TCU Horned Frogs. With the Bendigo Spirit in 2022, she was named the WNBL Most Valuable Player.

In 2022, Maley played four games for the Chicago Sky in the Women's National Basketball Association (WNBA). She returned to the WNBA in 2026, playing with the Phoenix Mercury and New York Liberty.

== Early life and career ==
Maley was born in Melbourne, Victoria, in the suburb of East Melbourne. She attended Eltham High School and played both basketball and volleyball as a youth.

In 2014 as a 15-year-old, Maley moved to Canberra to attend the Australian Institute of Sport (AIS) and play for the BA Centre of Excellence in the South East Australian Basketball League (SEABL). After two seasons, she returned to Melbourne and was set to play for the Nunawading Spectres in the 2016 SEABL season. However, due to burnout which led to anxiety and depression, Maley took time away from basketball in 2016 after she was admitted to a hospital psychiatric ward following a panic attack that closely resembled the physical symptoms of cardiac arrest.

Maley returned to basketball later in the year at Box Hill Senior Secondary College, where she led the school to the Australian Schools Championship title.

In December 2016, Maley signed with the Adelaide Lightning for the rest of the 2016–17 WNBL season. In 12 games, she averaged 3.9 points and 4.2 rebounds per game. She then played for the Dandenong Rangers in the 2017 SEABL season.

== College career ==
In April 2017, Maley signed a National Letter of Intent to play college basketball for the University of Oregon. With the Ducks of the Pac-12 Conference in the NCAA Division I, she played in 37 games as a freshman in 2017–18, including all 18 Pac-12 regular season games and all three Pac-12 tournament games as the Ducks won both conference titles. She averaged just under 10 minutes per game and scored a total of 81 points on the season.

In April 2018, Maley transferred to Texas Christian University (TCU). She was initially deemed ineligible to play in the 2018–19 season due to NCAA transfer rules, but she received a waiver to play immediately. She left the TCU Horned Frogs mid-season after playing 10 games between 6 November and 20 December.

== Professional career ==
In February 2019, Maley signed with the Diamond Valley Eagles of the NBL1 for the league's inaugural season. She went on to earn NBL1 Youth Player of the Year honours.

In August 2019, Maley signed with the Southside Flyers for the 2019–20 WNBL season.

Maley joined the Sydney Uni Flames for the 2020 WNBL Hub season in Queensland. She then joined the Eltham Wildcats of the NBL1 South for the 2021 NBL1 season.

In May 2021, Maley signed with the Bendigo Spirit for the 2021–22 WNBL season. In round four, she had 38 points and 20 rebounds against the UC Capitals. She led the league in scoring and rebounding, averaging 19.8 points and 15.7 rebounds in 16 games. She was subsequently named the recipient of the WNBL Most Valuable Player Award and earned All-WNBL First Team honours.

Following the WNBL season, Maley joined the Chicago Sky and had a four-game stint during the 2022 WNBA season. She then returned to the Eltham Wildcats and had an eight-game stint during the 2022 NBL1 South season.

In July 2022, Maley re-signed with the Bendigo Spirit on a three-year deal. In the 2022–23 WNBL season, she averaged 16.2 points, 11 rebounds and 2.1 assists per game.

Following the WNBL season, Maley returned to the Chicago Sky, but was waived one day before the start of the 2023 WNBA season. She later reportedly had signed a WNBA injury replacement deal with Chicago, but withdrew to support her father following his cancer diagnosis. Upon returning to Australia, she parted ways with the Spirit and played nine games with the Eltham Wildcats during the 2023 NBL1 South season.

On 23 June 2023, Maley signed with the Perth Lynx for the 2023–24 WNBL season. She was named team captain. In her debut on 3 November 2023, she had 21 rebounds against the Sydney Flames to break the Lynx's 20-rebound record set by Jenny Crouse in 2002. On 18 February 2024, she had 17 points, 20 rebounds and eight assists in a 94–79 win over the University of Canberra Capitals. She helped the Lynx reach the WNBL grand final, where they lost 2–1 to the Southside Flyers. Maley missed two free throws and a lay-up in the dying stages of game two of the grand final series when scores were tied. The Flyers won on the buzzer and then won the championship in game three.

Maley joined the Perth Redbacks of the NBL1 West for the 2024 season. On 7 June, she had 27 points and 24 rebounds in a 91–90 loss to the Lakeside Lightning. She was named to the All-NBL1 West First Team.

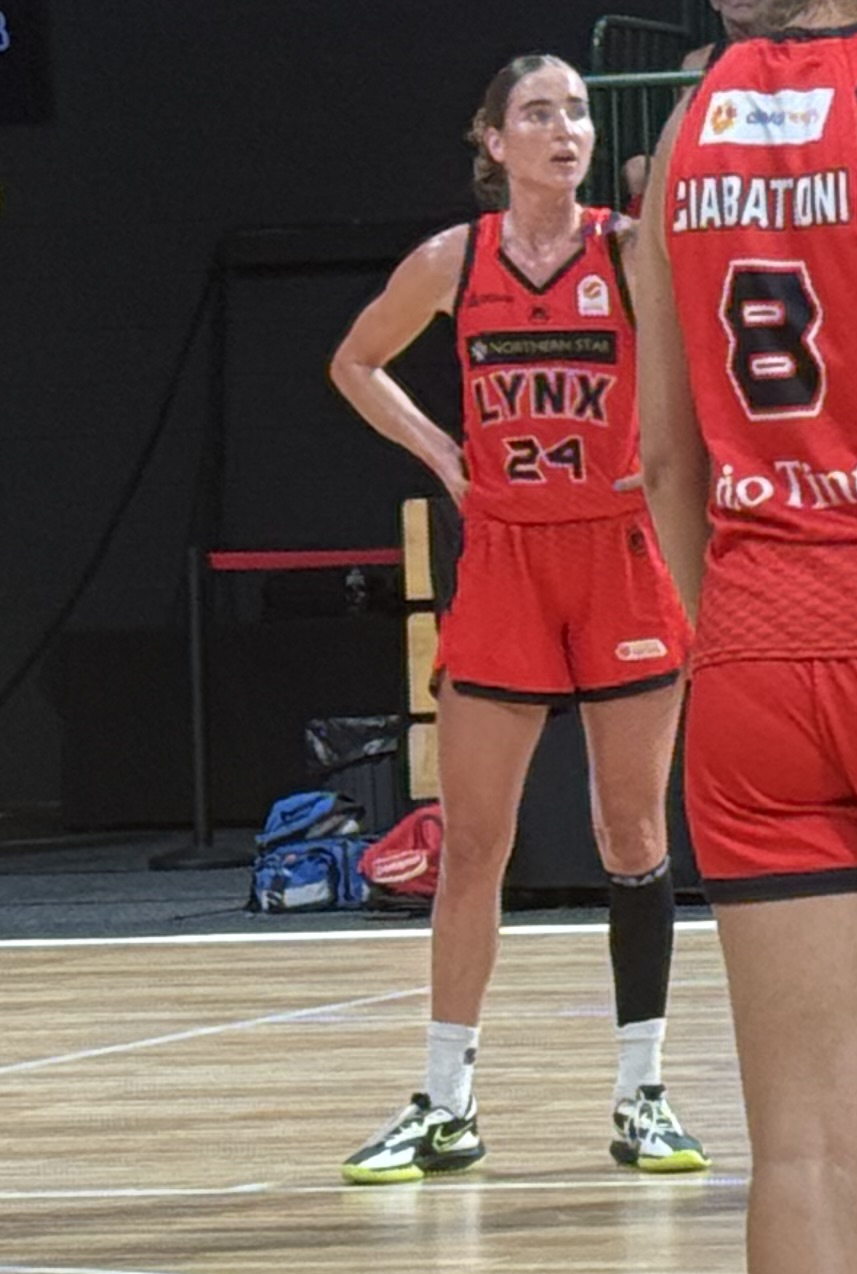
Maley with the Perth Lynx in January 2025

On 5 July 2024, Maley re-signed with the Lynx for the 2024–25 WNBL season. She was named co-captain of the team alongside Amy Atwell. On 18 January 2025, Maley had 22 rebounds in an 86–78 win over the Southside Flyers, breaking the club record for the most rebounds in a game. Following the WNBL season, she joined the Los Angeles Sparks for training camp ahead of the 2025 WNBA season. She was waived by the Sparks prior to the start of the regular season.

Maley re-joined the Perth Redbacks for the 2025 NBL1 West season. On 4 April 2025, she recorded a triple-double with 29 points, 30 rebounds and 10 assists in the Redbacks' 113–89 win over the Joondalup Wolves. On 17 April, she recorded 37 points, 23 rebounds and six steals in a 96–91 win over the Perry Lakes Hawks. She earned All-NBL1 West First Team honours for the second straight year.

On 16 June 2025, Maley re-signed with the Perth Lynx on a two-year deal. She returned as co-captain for the 2025–26 season. On 23 December, she recorded 16 points and 21 rebounds in a 75–49 win over the Canberra Capitals. On 1 February 2026, she tied her club record with 22 rebounds in an 88–64 win over the Bendigo Spirit. Six days later, she had 18 points, 10 rebounds and 10 assists in a 108–93 win over the Sydney Flames, becoming just the fifth player in club history to record a triple-double (after Michele Timms, Tully Bevilaqua, Deanna Smith and Melissa Marsh) and the first since Marsh in 2009. She finished the regular season as the league's leading rebounder with 14.2 per game. For the season, she was named the Lynx Club MVP, the WNBL's Fans MVP, and earned All-WNBL First Team honours. She helped the Lynx advance to their third WNBL Grand Final in five years, recording a seventh straight double-double in game two of the semi-finals. In the grand final series, the Lynx lost 2–0 to the Townsville Fire despite Maley's 27 points and 19 rebounds in the game two overtime loss.

In March 2026, Maley joined Hebei Win Power of the Women's Chinese Basketball Association (WCBA), where she played three games to finish the 2025–26 season.

Maley re-joined the Perth Redbacks for the 2026 NBL1 West season. On 10 April 2026, she scored 65 points to go with 17 rebounds in a 111–102 win over the Willetton Tigers, surpassing Elijah Pepper's 59 points to set a new all-time NBL1 scoring record.

Maley joined the New York Liberty for training camp ahead of the 2026 WNBA season, but was waived prior to the start of the regular season. On 8 May 2026, she was claimed off waivers by the Phoenix Mercury. She was waived by the Mercury on 16 May after appearing in two games. On 23 May, the Liberty signed Maley to a developmental player contract. After appearing in seven games as a developmental player, Maley's contract was converted to a standard WNBA deal on 3 September 2026.

Following the 2026 WNBA playoffs, Maley re-joined the Lynx for the 2026–27 WNBL season. She was again named the team's co-captain, this time alongside Alex Ciabattoni.

== WNBA career statistics ==
Legend
GP	Games played	GS	Games started	MPG	Minutes per game	RPG	Rebounds per game
APG	Assists per game	SPG	Steals per game	BPG	Blocks per game	PPG	Points per game
TO	Turnovers per game	FG%	Field-goal percentage	3P%	3-point field-goal percentage	FT%	Free-throw percentage
**Bold**	Career best	°	League leader

=== Regular season ===
Year	Team	GP	GS	MPG	FG%	3P%	FT%	RPG	APG	SPG	BPG	TO	PPG
2022	Chicago	4	0	**11.0**	**.500**	**.667**	—	**1.8**	**.8**	**.8**	**.3**	.3	**2.0**
2026	Phoenix	2	0	3.0	.000	—	.500	1.0	.0	.0	.0	**.0**	.5
2026	New York	**9**	0	8.4	.077	.167	**1.000**	1.1	.4	.6	.1	.1	.8
Career	2 years, 3 teams	15	0	8.4	.190	.333	.833	1.3	.5	.5	.1	.1	1.1

=== Playoffs ===
WNBA playoff statistics
Year	Team	GP	GS	MPG	FG%	3P%	FT%	RPG	APG	SPG	BPG	TO	PPG
2026	New York	1	0	2.0	—	—	—	1.0	.0	.0	.0	.0	.0
**Career**	1 year, 1 team	1	0	2.0	—	—	—	1.0	.0	.0	.0	.0	.0

== National team career ==
Maley first played for Australia at the 2013 FIBA Oceania Under-16 Championship. She went on to play at the 2014 FIBA Under-17 World Championship, 2014 FIBA Oceania Under-18 Championship, 2015 FIBA Under-19 World Championship, and 2017 FIBA Under-19 World Cup.

In 2022, Maley played for the Australian Opals at the FIBA World Cup.

With the Australian 3x3 team, Maley won silver at the 2022 FIBA 3x3 Asia Cup and bronze at the 2023 FIBA 3x3 World Cup. She helped Australia win gold at the 2024 FIBA 3x3 Asia Cup and helped the team win the 2024 Olympic Qualifying Tournament. She was subsequently named in Australia's first 3x3 Olympic team for the 2024 Paris Olympics. In March 2025, she was named in the Australia 3x3 team for the FIBA 3x3 Champions Cup in Bangkok, Thailand. She helped the team win the 3x3 Champions Cup bronze medal. Later that month, she helped Australia win back-to-back gold medals at the 2025 FIBA 3x3 Asia Cup. In June 2025, she was named in the Australia 3x3 team for the 2025 FIBA 3x3 World Cup in Mongolia.

== Personal life ==
Maley's father, Paul Maley, was born in the United States and later moved to Australia where he played 270 games in the National Basketball League (NBL). She has two brothers. Her brother, Finnbar, was drafted by the North Melbourne Football Club in 2023.

As of 2024, Maley was engaged to fellow professional basketball player, Marena Whittle.
