= Alex Ciabattoni =

Australian basketball player (born 1994)

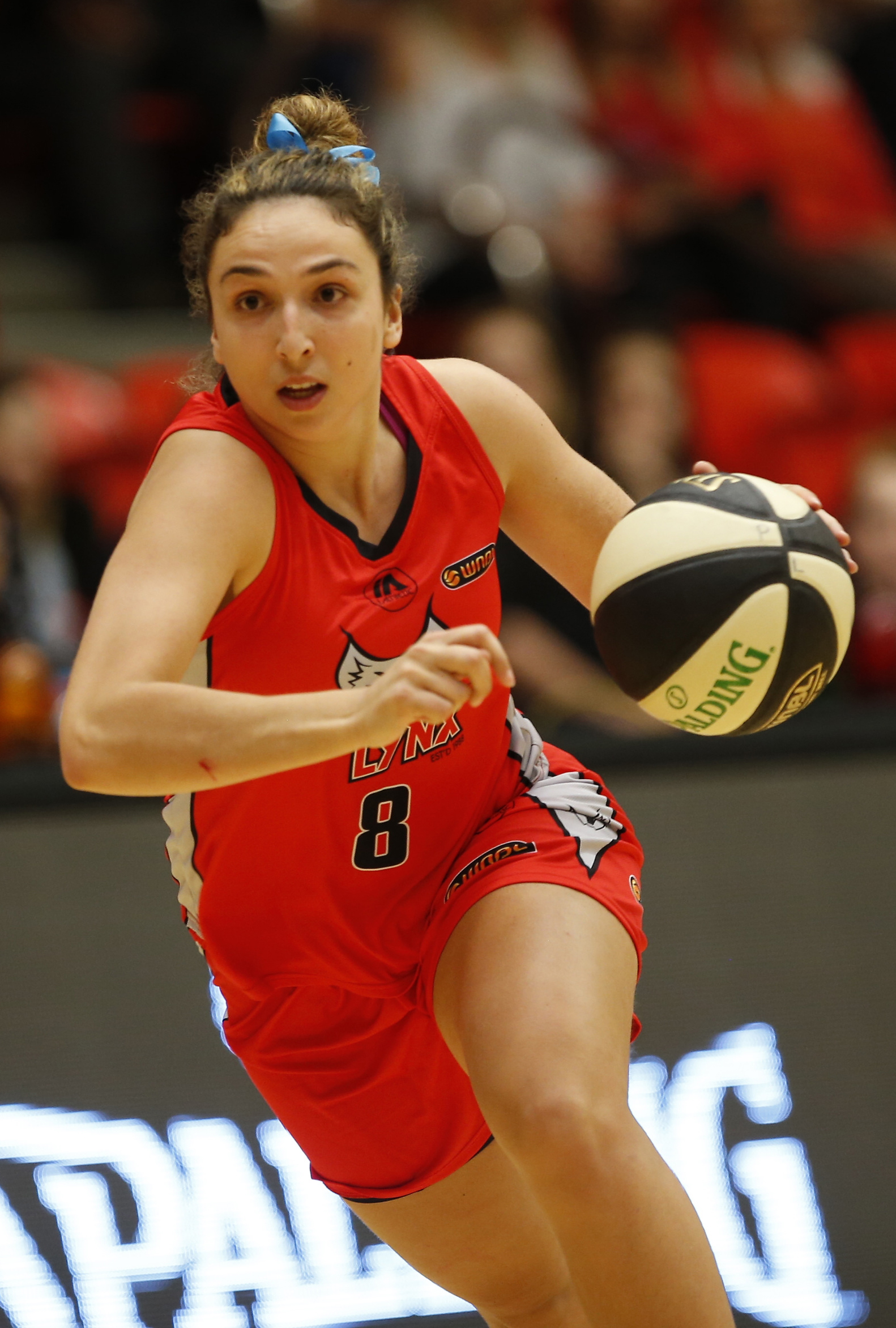
- Ciabattoni with the Perth Lynx in 2017

No. 8 – Perth Lynx
- Position: Guard
- League: WNBL

Personal information
- Born: 1 June 1994 (age 32) Adelaide, South Australia, Australia
- Listed height: 180 cm (5 ft 11 in)

Career information
- High school: Mary MacKillop College (Adelaide, South Australia)
- College: Newman (2012–2014)
- Playing career: 2010–present
- Coaching career: 2023–present

Career history

Playing
- 2010–2012: Southern Tigers
- 2013: South Adelaide Panthers
- 2015–2017: Adelaide Lightning
- 2016: Albury Wodonga Bandits
- 2017: Hobart Chargers
- 2017–2018: Perth Lynx
- 2018: Kalamunda Eastern Suns
- 2018–2019: Reyer Venezia
- 2019: →Ponzano Basket
- 2019: Rockingham Flames
- 2019: Reyer Venezia
- 2019–2020: Treofan Battipaglia
- 2020–2022: Perth Lynx
- 2021: Rockingham Flames
- 2022–2023: South West Slammers
- 2023–present: Perth Lynx
- 2024: Cockburn Cougars
- 2025: Rockingham Flames
- 2026: Cockburn Cougars
- 2026: West Adelaide Bearcats

Coaching
- 2023: South West Slammers

Career highlights
- All-WNBL Second Team (2026); WNBL Rookie of the Year (2016); SBL champion (2019); All-NBL1 West First Team (2024); SBL All-Defensive Five (2018); Heartland Conference Player of the Year (2014); 2× First-team All-Heartland Conference (2013, 2014); Heartland Conference Freshman of the Year (2013)

Alexandra Antonietta Ciabattoni (born 1 June 1994) is an Australian-Italian professional basketball player for the Perth Lynx of the Women's National Basketball League (WNBL). She played college basketball for the Newman Jets before beginning her career in the WNBL in 2015.

== Early life ==
Ciabattoni was born in Adelaide, South Australia, where she attended Mary MacKillop College and played in the Central ABL for the Southern Tigers (2010–12) and South Adelaide Panthers (2013).

== College career ==
In 2012, Ciabattoni moved to the United States to play college basketball for Newman University. As a freshman in 2012–13, she was named to the All-Heartland Conference First Team and received Heartland Conference Freshman of the Year honours. She averaged team highs in points (13.7) and rebounds (7.8) per game.

As a sophomore at Newman in 2013–14, Ciabattoni was named the Heartland Conference Player of the Year and All-Heartland Conference First Team. She averaged a league-best 20.3 points and shot a league-best 59.5 percent (sixth highest total in the NCAA). She was also named to the Heartland Conference All-Tournament Team. On 15 February 2014, she scored a career-high 39 points to lead the Jets to a 80–75 win over Oklahoma Panhandle State.

In June 2014, Ciabattoni left Newman and signed a Grant-in-Aid offer from Stetson. Due to NCAA transfer regulations, she was forced to redshirt the 2014–15 season. While she was unable to play for Stetson, she did earn Atlantic Sun All-Academic Team honors for the 2014–15 season.

== Professional career ==
While back in Adelaide during the 2015 off-season, Ciabattoni decided to try out for the Adelaide Lightning, a team scrambling for players in the wake of the club's near off-season dissolution. As a result, she did not return to Stetson; instead, she signed with the Lightning in August 2015 for the 2015–16 WNBL season and went on to win the WNBL Rookie of the Year Award. Ciabattoni averaged 4.6 points per game at 46 per cent and 2.4 rebounds.

Following her rookie season in the WNBL, Ciabattoni joined the Albury Wodonga Bandits for the 2016 SEABL season. In 22 games for the Bandits, she averaged 12.1 points, 6.0 rebounds and 2.2 assists per game.

In June 2016, Ciabattoni re-signed with the Adelaide Lightning for the 2016–17 WNBL season.

In March 2017, Ciabattoni joined the Hobart Chargers for the 2017 SEABL season. She was rushed into the squad as a replacement for American Cassie Cooke, who was ruled out for the season with a knee injury. After originally signing with the Melbourne Tigers, Ciabattoni felt it wasn't the right fit and ended up landing in Hobart.

On 1 August 2017, Ciabattoni signed with the Perth Lynx for the 2017–18 WNBL season. Following the WNBL season, she joined the Kalamunda Eastern Suns for the 2018 State Basketball League season.

Ciabattoni split the 2018–19 season in Italy, starting with Reyer Venezia before being loaned to Ponzano Basket Veneto in February 2019. She joined the Rockingham Flames in June 2019 for the rest of the SBL season and helped the team win the championship.

For the 2019–20 season, Ciabattoni returned to Reyer Venezia. In November 2019, she left Reyer and joined rival team Treofan Battipaglia for the rest of the season.

Ciabattoni returned to the Perth Lynx for the 2020 WNBL Hub season and then returned to the Rockingham Flames for the 2021 NBL1 West season.

In June 2021, Ciabattoni re-signed with the Lynx for the 2021–22 WNBL season.

In May 2022, Ciabattoni joined the South West Slammers midway through the 2022 NBL1 West season. In nine games, she averaged 16.33 points, 5.22 rebounds and 3.78 assists and 2.11 steals per game. In December 2022, she was appointed head coach of the Slammers women for the 2023 NBL1 West season. Midway through the season, she joined the playing group as player-coach, averaging 4.75 points, 3.88 rebounds and 3.63 assists in eight games.

On 26 June 2023, Ciabattoni signed with the Perth Lynx for the 2023–24 WNBL season, returning to the team for a third stint. Key to her return, according to coach Ryan Petrik, was her "leadership, basketball smarts, and being a quality ball handler and defender."

Ciabattoni joined the Cockburn Cougars for the 2024 NBL1 West season. On 12 July, she had a triple-double with 13 points, 12 rebounds and 12 assists in a 131–78 win over the Kalamunda Eastern Suns. She was named to the All-NBL1 West First Team. She helped the Cougars reach the NBL1 West grand final, where they lost 97–81 to the Rockingham Flames despite Ciabattoni's game-high 30 points.

After mulling over European options, Ciabattoni re-signed with the Lynx late in the off-season as the last player announced by the club for the 2024–25 WNBL season. On 16 February 2025, in the regular season finale, Ciabattoni hit the match winning shot for the first time in her career, helping the Lynx defeat the Townsville Fire in overtime to secure second place.

Ciabattoni joined the Rockingham Flames for the 2025 NBL1 West season.

On 4 July 2025, Ciabattoni re-signed with the Lynx for the 2025–26 WNBL season. On 21 December 2025, she scored a career-high 32 points in a 109–82 win over the Adelaide Lightning. She was named to the All-WNBL Second Team. She helped the Lynx reach the WNBL grand final series, where they lost 2–0 to the Townsville Fire despite her 23 points in game two. For the season, she averaged career highs in points (14.8), three-pointers made (1.2), rebounds (3.2) and blocks (0.6).

Ciabattoni joined the Cockburn Cougars for the 2026 NBL1 West season, returning to the team for a second stint. After six games, she left the Cougars and joined the West Adelaide Bearcats for the rest of the 2026 NBL1 Central season. She helped the Bearcats reach the NBL1 Central grand final, where they lost 76–70 to the Sturt Sabres despite Ciabattoni's 16 points.

On 5 May 2026, Ciabattoni re-signed with the Lynx for the 2026–27 WNBL season. She was named the team's co-captain alongside Anneli Maley.

== Personal life ==
Ciabattoni holds an Italian passport.

Ciabattoni gave birth to her first child in January 2023. She married former basketball player James Goodlad in South Australia in December 2024. She retained her maiden name following marriage.
