= Mikhaela Cann =

Australian basketball player

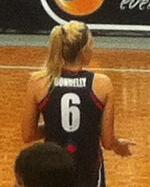

Sydney Flames
- Position: Point guard
- League: WNBL

Personal information
- Born: 30 April 1994 (age 32) Brisbane, Queensland, Australia
- Listed height: 173 cm (5 ft 8 in)

Career information
- High school: John Paul College (Brisbane, Queensland)
- Playing career: 2010–present

Career history
- 2010–2012: Australian Institute of Sport
- 2012–2014: Logan Thunder
- 2017–2019: Townsville Fire
- 2025–present: Sydney Flames
Medals
Representing Australia
Basketball
Youth Olympic Games
Silver medal – second place	2010 Singapore	Team
FIBA U18 Oceania Championship
Gold medal – first place	2012 New Zealand	Team
FIBA U16 Oceania Championship
Gold medal – first place	2009 Australia	Team

Mikhaela Cann (née Donnelly; born 30 April 1994) is an Australian professional basketball player.

== Early life ==
Cann was born in Brisbane, Queensland, in the suburb of Sunnybank. She attended John Paul College in Brisbane.

== Playing career ==
=== WNBL ===
Cann played for the Australian Institute of Sport in the WNBL between 2010 and 2012. After playing with the Logan Thunder between 2012 and 2014, she had a three-year hiatus from the WNBL. She joined the Townsville Fire for the 2017–18 season. She left the Fire following the 2018–19 season.

Cann made her return to the WNBL by signing a one-year deal with the Sydney Flames in June 2025.

=== NBL1 ===
In 2025, Cann helped the Logan Thunder win the NBL1 North championship. In 2026, she was named NBL1 North co-Defensive Player of the Year and earned NBL1 North All Star Five Second Team honours.

=== National team ===
Cann played for Australia at the 2009 FIBA Oceania Under-16 Championship and the 2012 FIBA Oceania Under-18 Championship.

== Personal life ==
Cann and her husband, basketball coach Luke Cann, have three daughters.
