= Lucy Olsen =

American basketball player (born 2003)

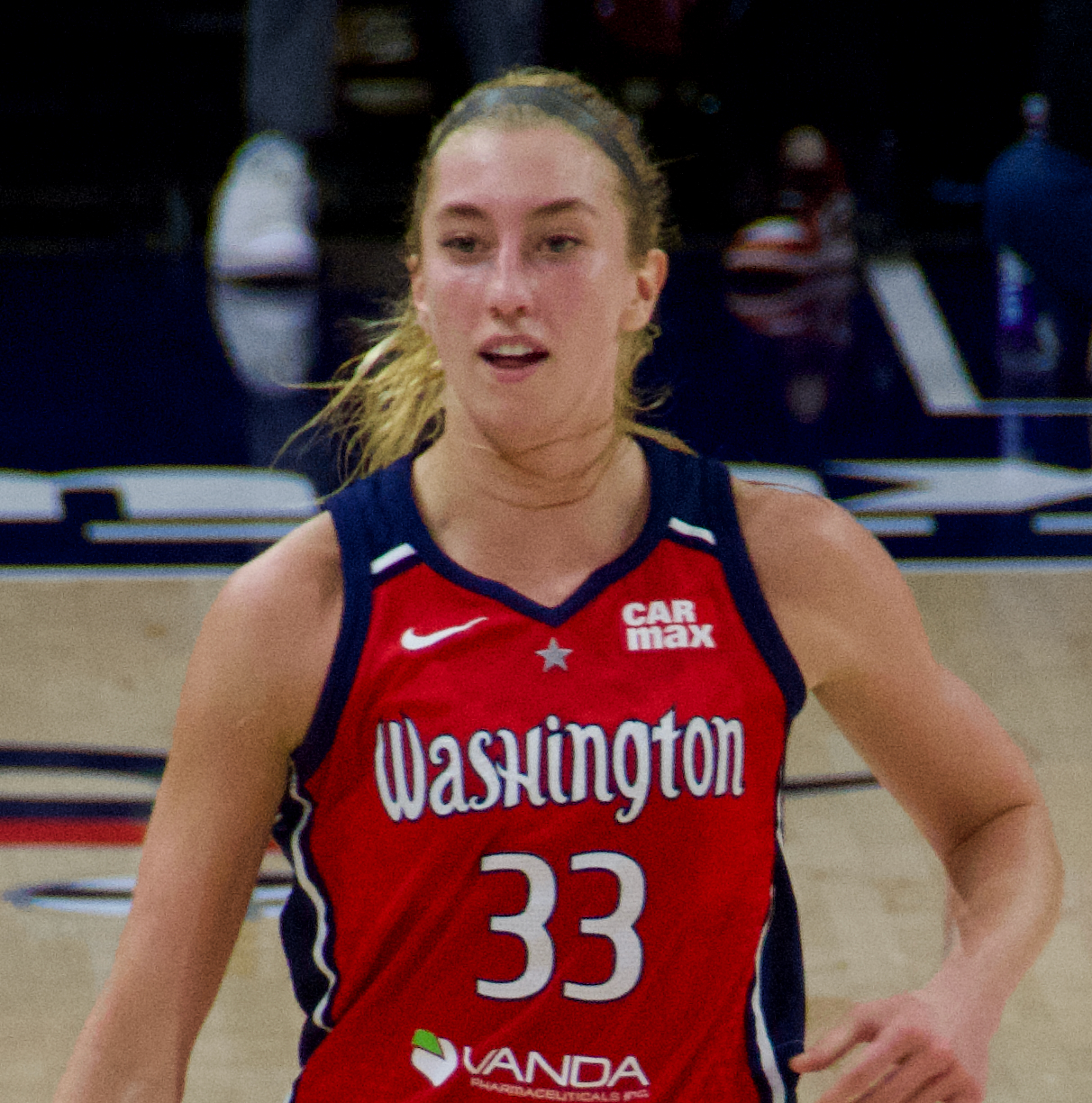
- Olsen with Washington Mystics in 2025

No. 33 – Washington Mystics
- Position: Point guard
- League: WNBA

Personal information
- Born: May 26, 2003 (age 23) Collegeville, Pennsylvania, U.S.
- Listed height: 5 ft 10 in (1.78 m)
- Listed weight: 141 lb (64 kg)

Career information
- High school: Spring-Ford (Montgomery County, Pennsylvania)
- College: Villanova (2021–2024); Iowa (2024–2025)
- WNBA draft: 2025: 2nd round, 23rd overall pick
- Drafted by: Washington Mystics

Career history
- 2025–present: Washington Mystics
- 2025–present: Townsville Fire

Career highlights
- WNBL champion (2026); WNBL Sixth Woman of the Year (2026); First-team All-Big Ten (2025); Big East Most Improved Player (2024); First-team All-Big East (2024); Big East All-Freshman Team (2022); Miss Pennsylvania Basketball (2021)
- Stats at Basketball Reference
Medals
Women's basketball
Representing the United States
FIBA 3x3 U23 Nations League Final
Gold medal – first place	2023 Ulaanbaatar

Lucy Anne Olsen (born May 26, 2003) is an American professional basketball player for the Washington Mystics of the Women's National Basketball Association (WNBA) and the Townsville Fire of the Women's National Basketball League (WNBL). She played college basketball for the Iowa Hawkeyes and previously played for the Villanova Wildcats. Olsen was selected 23rd overall by the Mystics in the 2025 WNBA draft.

== Early life and high school career ==
Olsen played high school basketball for Spring-Ford Area School District in Montgomery County, Pennsylvania, where she set the school record for career points and assists and was named first-team all-state two times. She was named the Miss Pennsylvania Basketball in 2021.

Olsen was also a member of her high school tennis team. She was the PIAA state champion in tennis in the fall of 2020.

== College career ==
=== Villanova ===
Olsen was named to the Big East All-Rookie Team in her freshman season at Villanova. In her sophomore season, she was named to the All-Big East Second Team and earned first team All-Big 5 accolades.

In her junior season, Olsen was ranked third in the country in scoring at 23.3 points per game. She was also named unanimous first team All-Big East selection and voted the Big East Most Improved Player. She was an Honorable Mention All-American honoree by both the WBCA and the Associated Press. She was the 2024 Philadelphia Big 5 Player of the Year.

=== Iowa ===
On April 18, 2024, Olsen transferred to Iowa for the 2024–25 season.

== Professional career ==
=== WNBA ===
==== Washington Mystics (2025–present) ====
On April 14, 2025, Olsen was selected 23rd overall by the Washington Mystics in the 2025 WNBA draft.

=== Overseas ===
In July 2025, Olsen signed with the Townsville Fire of the Women's National Basketball League (WNBL) for the 2025–26 season. She was named the WNBL Sixth Woman of the Year.

== National team career ==
Olsen helped the USA U21 squad to first place at the 2023 FIBA 3x3 U23 Nations League Final in Ulaanbaatar, Mongolia. She won the gold medal with team USA in the 2023 FIBA 3x3 U23 Nations League Final. On July 5, 2024, she was selected to the USA U23 Nations League roster to compete at the 2024 FIBA 3x3 Nations League Americas Conference in Mexico City.

== Career statistics ==
Legend
GP	Games played	GS	Games started	MPG	Minutes per game	RPG	Rebounds per game
APG	Assists per game	SPG	Steals per game	BPG	Blocks per game	PPG	Points per game
TO	Turnovers per game	FG%	Field-goal percentage	3P%	3-point field-goal percentage	FT%	Free-throw percentage
**Bold**	Career best	°	League leader

=== WNBA ===
==== Regular season ====
Stats current through end of 2025 season

WNBA regular season statistics
Year	Team	GP	GS	MPG	FG%	3P%	FT%	RPG	APG	SPG	BPG	TO	PPG
2025	Washington	41	0	12.4	.415	.271	.824	1.2	1.2	0.4	0.1	0.5	4.0
**Career**	1 year, 1 team	41	0	12.4	.415	.271	.824	1.2	1.2	0.4	0.1	0.5	4.0

=== College ===
NCAA Statistics
Year	Team	GP	GS	MPG	FG%	3P%	FT%	RPG	APG	SPG	BPG	TO	PPG
2021–22	Villanova	33	33	29.6	.372	.307	.595	2.7	2.7	1.1	0.5	1.2	7.0
2022–23	Villanova	**37**	**37**	33.1	.411	.356	.763	4.1	4.4	1.4	0.2	1.6	12.4
2023–24	Villanova	35	35	**36.2**	**.438**	.294	**.807**	**4.8**	3.8	**1.9**	**0.6**	2.5	**23.3**
2024–25	Iowa	32	32	34.0	.436	**.360**	.744	3.6	**5.1**	1.3	0.3	**3.1**	17.9
**Career**		137	137	33.2	.423	.329	.759	4	3.8	1.4	0.4	2.1	15.2
