= Darwin Salties =

Basketball team

- Leagues: NBL1 North
- Founded: November 2021
- Dissolved: September 2024
- History: Darwin Salties; 2022–2024
- Arena: Darwin Basketball Stadium
- Location: Darwin, Northern Territory
- Team colors: Blue and orange
- Chairman: Gary Shipway (interim)
- Ownership: Darwin Basketball Association (DBA); Basketball Northern Territory (BNT)
- Championships: 0
- Website: nbl1.com.au

Darwin Salties was a NBL1 North club based in Darwin, Northern Territory, Australia. The club fielded a team in both the Men's and Women's NBL1 North for three seasons and played their home games at Darwin Basketball Stadium. The club was run under the joint management of Darwin Basketball Association (DBA) and Basketball Northern Territory (BNT).

== Club history ==
On 10 November 2021, the NBL1 announced that a club from Darwin under the joint management of Darwin Basketball Association (DBA) and Basketball Northern Territory (BNT) would enter the Queensland-based NBL1 North competition for the 2022 NBL1 season. The club's entry saw the NBL1 become the first Australian sport league to have clubs based in and playing out of every state and territory in Australia.

On 20 December 2021, DBA announced that the club would be called the Darwin Salties. The club colours of blue and orange as well as the logo were also revealed. The Salties made their debut in the NBL1 North on 30 April 2022, with both teams recording wins in their first game.

In September 2024, after three seasons in the NBL1 North, the Salties withdrew from the league due to financial difficulties. The club had been forced to pay for both their own travel, as well as travel for opposition teams, due to their position in a Queensland-based league, while being based in the Northern Territory. High air travel costs were also cited as a reason. The Salties had strong on-court results, with the men finishing second on the ladder in the 2024 season, and boasted the highest home crowd spectator numbers of any club in the NBL1 North.

In November 2024, it was revealed that the Salties had attempted to enter the NBL1 Central but were unable to meet the requirements for the 2025 season. At the time, the club were reportedly concentrating on returning for the 2026 season.

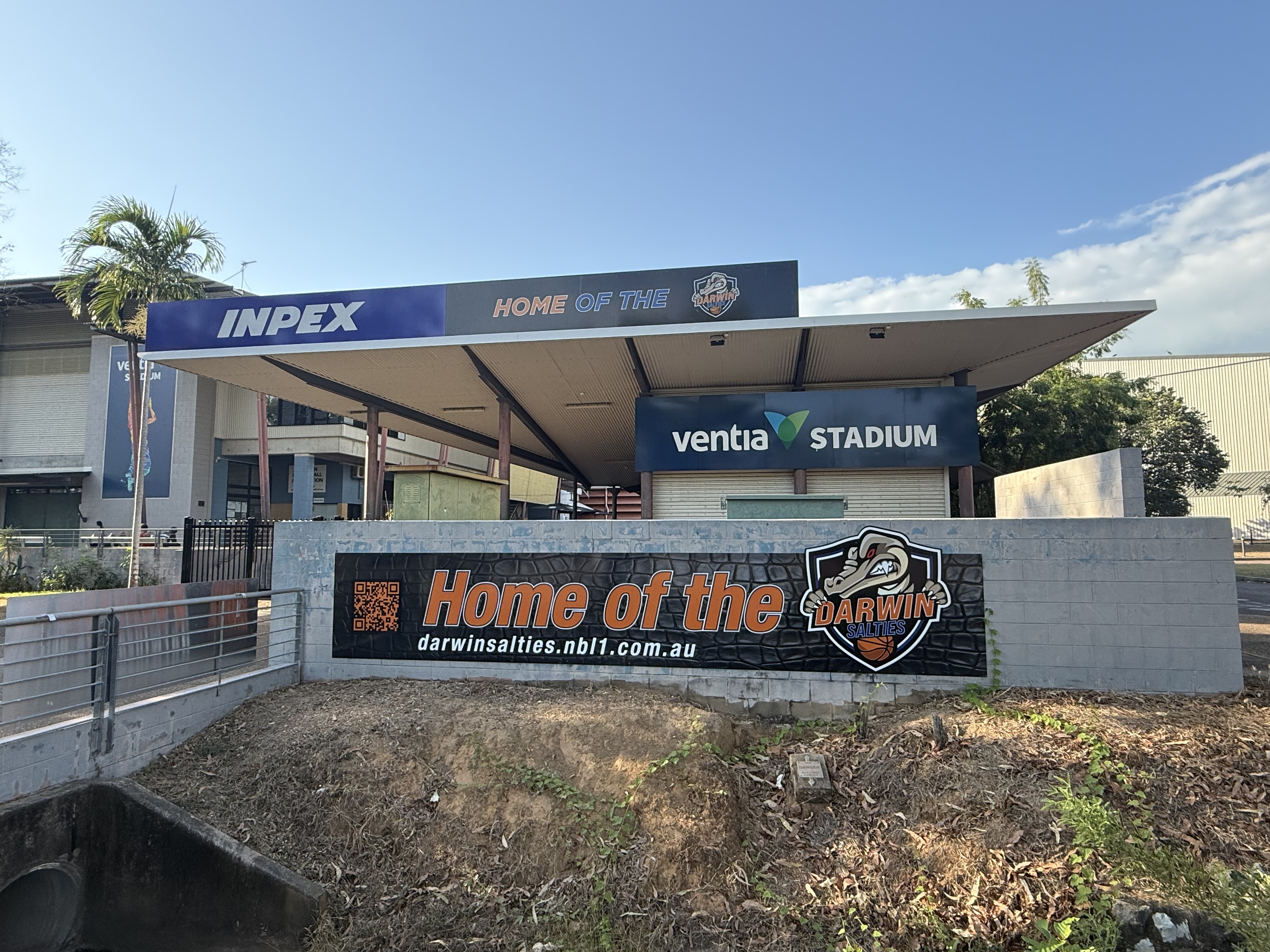
Darwin Basketball Stadium, September 2025
