= Alicia Froling =

Australian basketball player

No. 9 – Townsville Fire
- Position: Forward
- League: WNBL

Personal information
- Born: 31 January 1996 (age 30) Townsville, Queensland, Australia
- Listed height: 6 ft 3 in (1.91 m)

Career information
- High school: Lake Ginninderra College (Canberra, ACT)
- College: SMU (2014–2019)
- WNBA draft: 2019: undrafted
- Playing career: 2011–present

Career history
- 2011–2014: Townsville Fire
- 2020: Bendigo Spirit
- 2021–2022: Canberra Capitals
- 2022–2024: Bendigo Spirit
- 2024–present: Townsville Fire

Career highlights
- WNBL champion (2026)
Medals
Representing Australia
Basketball
FIBA U19 World Championship
Bronze medal – third place	2013 Lithuania	Team
Bronze medal – third place	2015 Russia	Team
FIBA Oceania Junior Championships
Gold medal – first place	2011 Canberra	U17 Team

Alicia Sue Froling (born 31 January 1996) is an Australian professional basketball player.

== Early life and career ==
Froling was born in Townsville, Queensland. She was a member of the Townsville Fire in the Women's National Basketball League (WNBL) between 2011 and 2014, playing limited minutes as a development player.

== College career ==
Froling played college basketball at Southern Methodist University in Dallas, Texas, for the SMU Mustangs between 2014 and 2019. She missed the 2017–18 season due to injury.

== Professional career ==
After finishing college, Froling had signed with the Bendigo Spirit for the 2019–20 WNBL season. However, she missed the season through injury. She re-joined the Spirit for the 2020 WNBL Hub season in Queensland.

For the 2021–22 WNBL season, Froling joined the Canberra Capitals. She then returned to the Spirit for 2022–23 and 2023–24.

For the 2024–25 WNBL season, Froling joined the Townsville Fire. In the 2025–26 season, Froling helped the Fire win the WNBL championship.

=== NBL1 ===
In August 2025, Froling helped the Knox Raiders win the NBL1 South championship and the NBL1 National championship.

In 2026, Froling was named All-NBL1 South Second Team as a member of the Knox Raiders. She helped the Raiders win back-to-back NBL1 South championships. At the 2026 NBL1 National Finals, the Raiders women returned to the championship game, where they defeated the Bankstown Bruins 86–73 to win their second consecutive NBL1 National championship. Froling was named Championship Game MVP after scoring a team-high 24 points.

== National team career ==
Froling first played for Australia at the 2011 FIBA Oceania Under-16 Championship . She then played at the 2012 FIBA Under-17 World Championship, 2013 FIBA Under-19 World Championship and 2015 FIBA Under-19 World Championship.

== Personal life ==
Froling has a twin sister, Keely, who is also a professional basketball player. She also had two younger brothers, Harry and Sam, have are also professional basketball players.

Froling's mother, Jenny, was part of the 1991 Hobart Islanders WNBL championship-winning team.
