= Diamond Valley Eagles =

- Leagues: NBL1 South
- Founded: 1984
- History: Men: Diamond Valley Eagles; 1990–present Women: Diamond Valley Eagles; 1984–present
- Arena: Diamond Valley Sports and Fitness Centre
- Location: Greensborough, Victoria
- Team colors: Red, green, white
- President: Stuart Callaghan
- Vice-president: Sarah Davies
- General manager: Patrick Di Lizio
- Championships: 0
- Website: NBL1.com.au

Diamond Valley Eagles is a NBL1 South club based in Melbourne, Victoria. The club fields a team in both the Men's and Women's NBL1 South. The club is a division of Diamond Valley Basketball Association, the major administrative basketball organisation in the Shire of Diamond Valley. The Eagles play their home games at Diamond Valley Sports and Fitness Centre.

== Club history ==
=== Background ===
Diamond Valley Basketball Association was established in 1974. Two years later, the Diamond Valley Sports and Fitness Centre was built.

=== WBC, CVIBL and Big V ===
In 1984, the Diamond Valley Eagles debuted in the inaugural season of the Women's Basketball Conference (WBC). They went on to play in the league's first three seasons.

In 1987, the Victorian Women's Conference (VWC) was established. In 1989, the VWC was renamed the Country Victorian Invitation Basketball League (CVIBL), with Diamond Valley earning CVIBL runners-up honours that year.

The earliest known appearance of the Diamond Valley men was in 1990, in what was the second year of the men's CVIBL competition. Both the Diamond Valley men and women played in the top division of the CVIBL, which was later renamed the Victorian Basketball League (VBL), every year up until 1999.

In 2000, the Eagles men were inaugural members of the Big V Championship Division. The women's team were demoted to the third division. This setup remained the same until in 2006, the women's team were promoted to the second division. After winning the second division in 2008, the Eagles women joined the men in the Big V Championship Division in 2009. Both teams remained in Championship Division up until 2017.

=== SEABL and NBL1 ===
In October 2017, the Eagles were accepted into the South East Australian Basketball League (SEABL) for the 2018 season, with the club moving its senior men's and women's teams from Big V State Championship into the SEABL.

Following the demised of the SEABL, the Eagles joined the NBL1 for the league's inaugural season in 2019. Both teams missed the finals in their first NBL1 season. The NBL1 South season did not go ahead in 2020 due to the COVID-19 pandemic.
