= Cairns Taipans all-time roster =

The Cairns Taipans are an Australian professional basketball team based in Cairns, Australia, and play in the National Basketball League. The team was established in 1999, and they play all their regular season games at the Cairns Convention Centre.

The following is a list of all the players, both past and current, who have appeared in at least one game for the club. (Updated 16 February 2025)

== 2000s ==
=== Players ===
Player	#	Position	Nationality	1999/2000	2000/01	2001/02	2002/03	2003/04	2004/05	2005/06	2006/07	2007/08	2008/09
Larry Abney	21	PF	American									Player	Player
Ben Arkell	4	G	Australian				Player	Player					
Tim Behrendorff	32	C	Australian						Player				
Steven Black	31	G	Italian/Australian									Player	Player
Gary Boodnikoff	20,29	PF	Australian						Player	Player	Player	Player	Player
Troy Boundy	11	F/G	Australian	Player	Player								
Chris Burgess	34	C	American						MVP	Player			
Martin Cattalini	6	SF	Australian							MVP	MVP	Captain	MVP
Andrew Clarke	11,13	G	Australian			Player	Player						
Brendan Clowry	11	SF	Australian						Player				
Scott Cook	5	PG	Australian									Player	Player
David Cooper	6	C/PF	Australian					Player					
Nathan Crosswell	21	SG	Australian						Player	Player			
Ian Crosswhite	9	C	Australian										Player
Brad Davidson	14,20	PG	Australian				Captain	Captain					
Tim Duggan	4	G	Australian	Player	Player	Player							
Aaron Fearne	14	F	Australian	Player	Player								
Matt Garrison	44	F	American			Player							
Deba George	15	PG	Australian							Player			
Aaron Grabau	8	SG	Australian	Player	Player	Player	Player	Player	Player	Player	Player	Player	Player
Rowan Gray	15,24	F/C	New Zealander/Australian			Player	Player						
Nathan Jawai	15	PF/C	Australian									MVP	
Terry Johnson	31	G	Australian	Captain									
Rashamel Jones	32	F	American	Player									
Ron Kelly	44	C	American				Player						
Ben Knight	33,40	PF	Australian		MVP	Player	MVP						
Grant Kruger	51	F	Australian	Player									
Luke Martin	11	PG	Australian								Player		
Darnell Mee	13	SG/SF	Australian							Player	Captain		Player
Dewey Michaels	40	C	American/Australian			Player							
Nikola Mirich	30	F/C	Australian	Player	Player								
Keiron Mitchelhill	22	G	Australian	Player									
Andre Moore	41	PF	American	Player	Player								
Jared Newson	10	F	American									Player	
Kane Oakley	10,20,21	PF	Australian			Player	Player	Player		Player	Player		
Kevin Owens	15	C	American								Player		
Kenny Payne	22	SF	American		Player								
Jamie Pearlman	21	G	Australian		Player	Player							
Tony Rampton	12,15,24	C	New Zealander			Player	Player	Player	Player				
Brad Robbins	5	SG	Australian						Player				
Ricky Robinson	21	F/C	American	Player									
Robert Rose	21	SG	American								Player		
Rupert Sapwell	9,11	PF/C	Australian				Player	Player					
Matt Smith	50	C	Australian								Player	Player	Player
Anthony Stewart	23	SG	Australian		Captain	Captain	MVP	Player	Captain	Captain			
Dave Thomas	11	SF/SG	Canadian										Player
Melvin Thomas	33	PF/C	American/Australian					Player	Player	Player			
Marcus Timmons	7	SF	American					MVP	Player				
Aaron Trahair	13	SF/SG	Australian		MVP	Player							
Rashard Tucker	11	F	American									Player	
Dwayne Vale	4,5	SF	Australian								Player	Player	Player
Jayson Wells	31,33	PF	American			MVP	Captain						
Michael Wicks	7	G	Australian	Player									
Kerry Williams	1	SG	Australian										Player

=== Coaching staff ===
Coach	1999/2000	2000/01	2001/02	2002/03	2003/04	2004/05	2005/06	2006/07	2007/08	2008/09
Mark Beecroft							Assistant	Assistant	Assistant	Head Coach
Alan Black							Head Coach	Head Coach	Head Coach	Head Coach
John Dorge		Assistant	Assistant	Assistant	Assistant	Assistant				
Aaron Fearne			Assistant	Assistant	Assistant	Assistant	Assistant	Assistant	Assistant	Assistant
Wayne Hayres	Assistant									
Guy Molloy			Head Coach	Head Coach	Head Coach	Head Coach				
Rod Popp	Head Coach	Head Coach								

== 2010s ==
=== Players ===
Player	#	Position	Nationality	2009/2010	2010/11	2011/12	2012/13	2013/14	2014/15	2015/16	2016/17	2017/18	2018/19
Matthew Andronicos	32	C	Australian					Player	Player				
Dean Brebner	32	PF	Australian		Player	Player							
Gary Boodnikoff	20	PF	Australian	Player									
Shaun Bruce	7	PG	Australian					Player	Player	Player			
Matt Burston	22	C	Australian					Player	Player	Player			
Michael Carrera	24	SF	Venezuelan									Player	
Michael Chitham	5	SG	Australian	Player									
James Comino	3	SG/SF	Australian	Player									
Ashley Constable	1	PG	Australian						Player	Player			
Torrey Craig	2	SF	American						Player	Player			
Ian Crosswhite	9,11	C	Australian	Player	Captain	Captain							
Daniel Dillon	12	PG/SG	Australian		Player								
Ron Dorsey	7	SF/SG	American		Player								
Jeffrey Dowdell	10	SF	Australian			Player							
Shane Edwards	0	SF	American				Player						
Fuquan Edwin	23	SF	American								Player		
Nnanna Egwu	21	PF/C	American								Player	Player	
Jerry Evans	60	PF	American									Player	
Anthony Fisher	32	PG	Australian							Player	Player	Player	
Deba George	3,5	PG	Australian		Player	Player							
Cameron Gliddon	3	SG	Australian				Player	MVP	Captain	Captain	Captain	MVP	
Aaron Grabau	8	SG	Australian	Player	Player	Player	Player						
Devon Hall	6	SG	American										Player
Damon Heuir	6	PG	Australian						Player	Player	Player	Player	
Brad Hill	9	SF/SG	Australian			Player	Player						
Tevin Jackson	22	SF	Australian								Player	Player	
Nathan Jawai	15	PF/C	Australian								Player	Player	Player
Phil Jones	13	PF/C	American	Captain	Captain								
Christian Jurlina	10	SF	Australian										Player
Jarrod Kenny	6	PG	New Zealander										Player
Dexter Kernich-Drew	9	SG	Australian										Player
Fabijan Krslovic	20	C	Australian										Player
Kuany Kuany	7	SG	Australian									Player	Player
Robert Loe	14	C	Australian										Player
Alex Loughton	40	PF/C	Australian		Captain	Captain	Captain	Player	Player	Player	Player	Player	Captain
Corey Maynard	1	PG/SG	Australian						Player				
Demetri McCamey	30	PG	American					Player					
Mitchell McCarron	10	SG	Australian								Player	MVP	
Rich Melzer	34	SF/PF	American	Player									
Julien Mills	24	SG	American	Player									
Tony Mitchell	50	SF	American								Player		
D. J. Newbill	25	SG	American										Player
Chris Patton	45	PF/C	Australian									Player	
Tony Rampton	12	C	New Zealander	Player									
Brooke Ruscoe	8	SG	New Zealander					Player					
Dusty Rychart	45	PF/C	Australian	MVP	Player	Player	Player						
Will Sinclair	9	C	Australian							Player			
Scoochie Smith	11	PG	American									Player	
Nathan Sobey	20	PG/SG	Australian						Player				
Markel Starks	5	PG	Australian							Player			
Clint Steindl	10	SF/SG	Australian				Player	Player					
Lindsay Tait	4	PG/SG	New Zealander		Player								
Cameron Tragardh	11	PF	Australian				Player	Captain	Player	Player			
Travis Trice	0	PG	American								MVP		
Melo Trimble	1	SG	American										MVP
Ayinde Ubaka	3	PG/SG	American		MVP								
Dwayne Vale	4	SF	Australian	Player									
Lucas Walker	12	PF	Australian										Player
Andrew Warren	24	SG	American			Player							
Jarrad Weeks	97	PG	Australian								Player	Player	
Stephen Weigh	13	SG/SF	Australian					Player	Player	Player	Player	Player	
Scottie Wilbekin	5	PF	American						MVP	MVP			
Kerry Williams	1	SG	Australian	Player	Player	Player	Player						
Jamar Wilson	5	PG	American			MVP	MVP	Player					
Mark Worthington	33	PF	Australian							Player	Player		
Mitchell Young	3,9	PF	Australian					Player	Player				Player

=== Coaching staff ===
Coach	2009/2010	2010/11	2011/12	2012/13	2013/14	2014/15	2015/16	2016/17	2017/18	2018/19
Mick Downer	Assistant	Assistant	Assistant	Assistant	Assistant	Assistant				
Aaron Fearne	Head Coach	Head Coach	Head Coach	Head Coach	Head Coach	Head Coach	Head Coach	Head Coach	Head Coach	
Brad Hill										Assistant
Mike Kelly										Head Coach
Gordie McLeod							Assistant	Assistant	Assistant	Assistant
Jamie O'Loughlin									Assistant	Assistant
Jamie Pearlman				Assistant	Assistant	Assistant	Assistant	Assistant		

== 2020s ==
=== Players ===
Player	#	Position	Nationality	2019/2020	2020/21	2021/22	2022/23	2023/24	2024/25	2025/26	2026/27	2027/28	2028/29
Jonah Antonio	6	PG	Australian				Signed	Signed	Signed				
George Blagojevic	9	SF	Australian	Player	Player								
Majok Deng	13	PF	South Sudanese/Australian	Player	Player	Player	Signed	Signed					
Mirko Djeric	5	PG	Australian	Player	Player	Signed	Signed	Option					
Tad Dufelmeier	4	PG	Australian	Player	Player								
Anthony Fisher	32	PG	Australian	Player									
Jordan Hunt	13	C	New Zealand		Player								
Hyrum Harris	22	F	New Zealander		Player								
Robbie Heath	45	G	Australian			Player							
Brayden Inger	9	F	New Zealander			Player							
Nathan Jawai	15	PF/C	Australian	Captain	Player	Player							
Venky Jois	45	PF	Australian		Player								
Jarrod Kenny	6	PG	New Zealander	Player	Player	Player							
Mojave King	1	SG	Australian		Player								
Fabijan Krslovic	20	PF/C	Australian	Player	Player								
Bul Kuol	42	F	Australian			Player	Option						
Scott Machado	3	PG	Brazilian	MVP	Captain	Captain							
Nelson Marshall	44	G	Australian			Player							
Tahjere McCall	22	SG	American			Player	Signed	Signed					
D. J. Newbill	25	SG	American	Captain									
Jordan Ngatai	11	SF	New Zealander		Player	Player							
Kouat Noi	12	PF	Australian	Player	Player	Player	Option						
Cameron Oliver	0	C	American	Player	Player								
Keanu Pinder	25	PF/C	Australian			Player	Option						
Sam Waardenburg	21	PF	New Zealander				Signed	Signed					
Tai Wynyard	14	PF/C	New Zealander	Player									
Stephen Zimmerman	33	C	American			Player							

=== Coaching staff ===
Coach	2019/2020	2020/21	2021/22	2022/23	2023/24	2024/25	2025/26	2026/27	2027/28	2028/29
Adam Forde			Head Coach	Head Coach	Head Coach	Head Coach				
Sam Gruggen			Assistant	Assistant	Assistant					
Brad Hill	Assistant	Assistant								
Mike Kelly	Head Coach	Head Coach								
Will Lopez						Assistant				
Jamie O'Loughlin	Assistant	Assistant								
Kerry Williams			Assistant	Assistant	Assistant					
