= 2007 Australian Club Championships =

Tournament details
- Arena: Melbourne Sports and Aquatic Centre; Melbourne, Victoria
- Dates: 17–26 August

Final positions
- Champions: M: Cairns Marlins; W: Townsville Flames
- Runners-up: M: Dandenong Rangers; W: Hume City Broncos

The 2007 Australian Club Championships (ACC) brought together the best men's and women's basketball teams from the Waratah League, South East Australian Basketball League (SEABL), Queensland Australian Basketball League (QABL), Central Australian Basketball League (CABL) and Big V competitions for their shot at national glory, with the event held at the Melbourne Sports and Aquatic Centre.

By the end of the tournament, the Cairns Marlins were crowned as the best male basketball club in Australia and the Townsville Flames were crowned women's champions.

== Tournament overview ==
The Cairns Marlins defeated the Dandenong Rangers 110–98 in the men's Grand Final. Nothing could split the sides in the first half but the Rangers, who finished runners-up for the second year in a row, could not contain the offensive strength of the Marlins, who had five players score 16 points or more. Cairns Taipans National Basketball League stars Aaron Grabau and Gary Boodnikoff netted 24 points and 23 points respectively to lead the Marlins with Grabau going on to be named Grand Final MVP. Future Australian Boomer Nathan Jawai also chipped in with a 21-point, 13-rebound double-double and proved to be the difference in the decisive third quarter.

In the women's final, the Townsville Flames defeated the Hume City Broncos, 92–49. Australian Opal Rohanee Cox was outstanding for Townsville, netting a game-high 30 points while Townsville Fire Women's National Basketball League guard Celeste Heilbronn added 21 points and 9 rebounds in support. The Broncos were missing Opal Sharin Milner and Under 21 World Championship silver medalist Elyse Penaluna through injury and couldn't match the offensive power of the Flames.

== Participants ==
To qualify for the event, teams had to be crowned Champion of their respective Leagues. There were also a number of wildcard entries.

=== League champions ===
League	Men	Women
Big V	Dandenong Rangers	Hume City Broncos
CABL	North Adelaide Rockets	West Adelaide Bearcats
QABL	Cairns Marlins	Townsville Flames
SEABL	Bendigo Braves (South) & Geelong Supercats (East)	Bendigo Braves
Waratah	Sutherland Sharks	Hornsby Spiders

=== Wildcards ===
League	Men	Women
Big V		Waverley Falcons
CABL		Norwood Flames
QABL	Rockhampton Rockets	
SEABL		Ballarat Miners
Waratah	Sydney Comets	

== Results ==
=== Quarter-finals – men ===
17 August
7:30 p.m.

Cairns Marlins	110–95	Sydney Comets
Pts: N. Jawai 24		Pts: S. Whitehead 28

Cairns, Queensland

18 August
6:00 p.m.

Sutherland Sharks	98–87	Rockhampton Rockets
Pts: C. Tovey 22		Pts: P. Bullock 25

Sutherland, New South Wales

18 August
7:30 p.m.

Geelong Supercats	120–91	North Adelaide Rockets
Pts: S. Myers 32		Pts: E. Burdon 21

Geelong, Victoria

18 August
7:30 p.m.

Dandenong Rangers	100–70	Bendigo Braves
Pts: V. Inglima 27		Pts: C. Rigby 19

Dandenong, Victoria

=== Quarter-finals – women ===
18 August
7:00 p.m.

Townsville Flames	95–62	Hornsby Spiders
Pts: R. Cox 30		Pts: M. Musselwhite 35

Hornsby, New South Wales

18 August
7:00 p.m.

Hume City Broncos	83–52	Norwood Flames
Pts: E. Penaluna 28		Pts: N. Romeo 16

Broadmeadows, Victoria

18 August
7:30 p.m.

Ballarat Miners	70–59	West Adelaide Bearcats
Pts: K. Ashby 23		Pts: K. Shierlaw 14

Wayville, South Australia

19 August
2:00 p.m.

Bendigo Braves	82–61	Waverley Falcons
Pts: A. Walsh 20		Pts: C. Egan 24

Bendigo, Victoria

=== Semi-finals – men ===
25 August

Dandenong Rangers	99–84	Sutherland Sharks
Pts: V. Inglima 35		Pts: B. Henricks 25

Melbourne Sports and Aquatic Centre

25 August

Cairns Marlins	123–91	Geelong Supercats
Pts: A. Grabau 24		Pts: J. Medved 27

Melbourne Sports and Aquatic Centre

=== Semi-finals – women ===
25 August

Townsville Flames	77–54	Ballarat Miners
Pts: R. Cox 31		Pts: C. Allgood 14

Melbourne Sports and Aquatic Centre

25 August

Hume City Broncos	78–71	Bendigo Braves
Pts: K. Burbridge 21		Pts: K. Harrower 21

Melbourne Sports and Aquatic Centre

=== Grand Finals ===
26 August

Cairns Marlins	110–98	Dandenong Rangers
Pts: A. Grabau 24		Pts: B. Hobba 20

Melbourne Sports and Aquatic Centre

26 August

Townsville Flames	92–49	Hume City Broncos
Pts: R. Cox 30		Pts: N. Pedro 11

Melbourne Sports and Aquatic Centre

== All-Star Five ==
=== Men ===
Name	Team
Aaron Grabau (Grand Final MVP)	Cairns Marlins
Nathan Jawai	Cairns Marlins
Scott Cook	Cairns Marlins
Ash Cannan	Dandenong Rangers
Brent Hobba	Dandenong Rangers

=== Women ===
Name	Team
Rachael Flanagan	Townsville Flames
Rohanee Cox (Grand Final MVP)	Townsville Flames
Kristi Harrower	Bendigo Braves
Kellie Burbridge	Hume City Broncos
Naomi Pedro	Hume City Broncos

== See also ==
- Australian Basketball Association
