= Jamie O'Loughlin =

Australian basketball coach

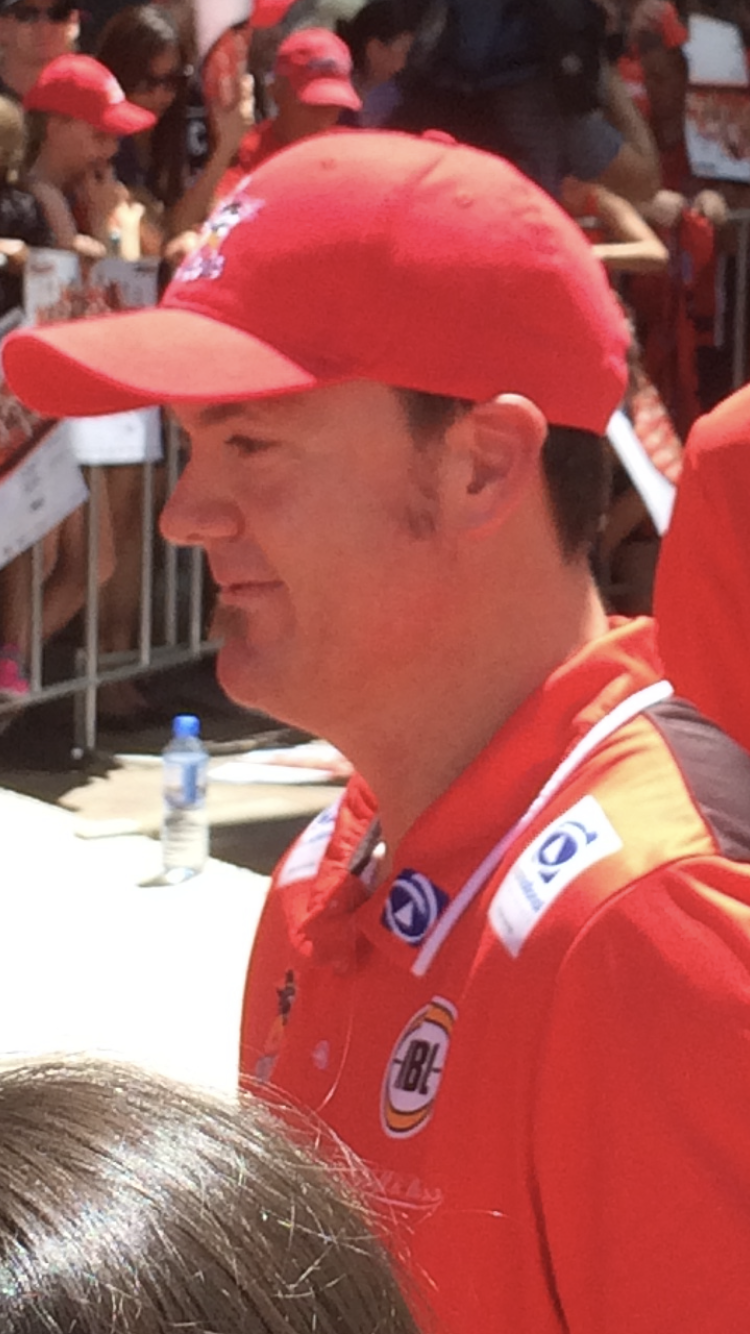
- O'Loughlin with the Perth Wildcats in 2017
- Coaching career: 2006–present

Career history

Coaching
- 2006–2009: Geelong Supercats (asst.)
- 2010–2014: Geelong Supercats
- 2014–2017: Perth Wildcats (asst.)
- 2017–2021: Cairns Taipans (asst.)
- 2018–2021: Cairns Marlins
- 2022: Mandurah Magic

Career highlights
- 2× NBL champion (2016, 2017); SEABL champion (2010); ABA national champion (2006)
Medals
Men's basketball
Representing Australia
FIBA U16 Oceania Championship
Gold medal – first place	2011 Canberra	Team competition
Gold medal – first place	2013 Melbourne	Team competition
FIBA U17 World Cup
Silver medal – second place	2012 Lithuania	Team competition
Silver medal – second place	2014 Dubai	Team competition
Universiade
Bronze medal – third place	2019 Napoli	Team competition

Jamie O'Loughlin is an Australian professional basketball coach.

== Coaching career ==
A native of Geelong, Victoria, O'Loughlin's coaching career started in 1999, when he was the Club Director of Coaching for Geelong's Christian College. He also coached under age teams at Basketball Geelong.

In 2006, O'Loughlin joined the Geelong Supercats of the South East Australian Basketball League (SEABL) as an assistant coach. He became head coach of the Supercats for the 2010 season, where he won the SEABL championships.

Between 2009 and 2011, O'Loughlin ran team camps for the Australia national under-17 basketball team, and in 2011 he coached the under-16 team at the 2011 FIBA Oceania Under-16 Championship. After leading the team to the Gold Medal, he rejoined the under-17 team and traveled to the 2012 FIBA Under-17 World Championship with them, where they reached the Silver Medal. O'Loughlin continued coaching both the under-16 and under-17 teams until 2014, during which he won another Gold Medal (with the under-16 team) and another Silver Medal (with the under-17 team).

O'Loughlin moved to Perth in 2014 and joined the Perth Wildcats of the NBL as an assistant coach. The Wildcats won championship in 2015–16 and 2016–17.

O'Loughlin moved to Cairns in 2017 and joined rival NBL club the Cairns Taipans as the second assistant coach under coach Aaron Fearne. After his first season with the Taipans, O'Loughlin joined the club's QBL feeder team, the Cairns Marlins as the head coach in 2018, and guided the club to the grand final against the Townsville Heat. The Marlins lost both games of the series.

In July 2018, O'Loughlin was promoted to first assistant of the Taipans under new coach Mike Kelly.

O'Loughlin was named as an assistant coach in the UniSport Australia Emerging Boomers squad in 2019, and traveled to Naples, Italy, to compete in the 2019 Summer Universiade. He joined head coach Rob Beveridge and helped the team finish the games with a bronze medal.

In May 2022, O'Loughlin took over as head coach of the Mandurah Magic men's team for the rest of the 2022 NBL1 West season.

In April 2025, O'Loughlin was appointed as the WAIS wheelchair basketball head coach.
