= C. J. Massingale =

American basketball player (born 1982)

Personal information
- Born: 23 September 1982 (age 44) Tacoma, Washington, U.S.
- Listed height: 6 ft 3 in (1.91 m)
- Listed weight: 190 lb (86 kg)

Career information
- High school: Mount Tahoma (Tacoma, Washington)
- College: Washington (2000–2003); Metro State (2003–2004)
- NBA draft: 2004: undrafted
- Playing career: 2005–2022
- Position: Guard

Career history
- 2005–2013: Knox Raiders
- 2012: Adelaide 36ers
- 2014: Brisbane Spartans
- 2015: Northside Wizards
- 2017–2019: Sunshine Coast Phoenix
- 2021: Southern Districts Spartans
- 2022: Northside Wizards

Career highlights
- SEABL champion (2009); SEABL Grand Final MVP (2009); 3× SEABL MVP (2008, 2010, 2012); 6× SEABL Conference All-Star (2006, 2008–2012); 4× SEABL leading scorer (2008–2011); ABA Finals All-Star Five (2006); NCAA Division II champion (2004)

La Charles Rashawn "C. J." Massingale (born September 23, 1982) is an American-Australian former professional basketball player. He played three years of college basketball for Washington and one year for Metro State. He moved to Australia in 2005, where he has since played his entire career. He played nine seasons for the Knox Raiders in the SEABL. He had a short stint with the Adelaide 36ers of the NBL in 2012 before playing in Queensland from 2014 to 2022.

== Early life ==
Massingale was born in Tacoma, Washington, in 1982.

== Career ==
=== 2000–2003: College ===
A native of Tacoma, Washington, Massingale attended the University of Washington in Seattle from 2000 until 2003, after which he transferred to the Metropolitan State University of Denver in 2003 and was a member of the Roadrunners NCAA Division II National Championship winning team in 2004.

=== 2004–2012: Joining SEABL ===
After graduating from college in 2004, Massingale moved to Australia in 2005 and joined the Knox Raiders of the South East Australian Basketball League (SEABL). Between 2005 and 2012, he was a six-time Conference All Star (2006, 2008–2012), three-time SEABL MVP (2008, 2010, 2012), four-time SEABL leading scorer (2008–2011), and was the SEABL grand final MVP in 2009. He was the only active player on the SEABL 30th anniversary All Star Team and was named to the SEABL 2000s Team of the Decade.

=== 2012: NBL ===
On September 9, 2012, Massingale signed with the Adelaide 36ers as an import for the 2012–13 NBL season. He was released by the 36ers on December 5, 2012. In 10 games, he averaged 4.1 points per game.

=== 2013–2014: Return to SEABL ===
Massingale returned to the Knox Raiders for the 2013 SEABL season and averaged 22.2 points, 5.5 rebounds and 2.4 assists in 24 games. He moved to the Brisbane Spartans for the 2014 season.

=== 2015–2022: Queensland ===
In 2015, Massingale joined the Northside Wizards of the Queensland Basketball League (QBL). In 14 games for the Wizards, he averaged 15.4 points, 3.3 rebounds and 1.7 assists per game.

Between 2017 and 2019, Massingale played for the Sunshine Coast Phoenix in the QBL.

Massingale played for the Southern Districts Spartans during the 2021 NBL1 North season. He returned to the Northside Wizards for the 2022 NBL1 North season.

== Personal life ==
Massingale and his wife, Leilani, have a daughter named Cydney and a son named Kingston. In 2014, he became an Australian citizen and now currently works in coaching the next generation of "NC Basketballers".
