= 2006 ABA National Finals =

Tournament details
- Arena: Broadmeadow Basketball Stadium; Newcastle, New South Wales
- Dates: 1–3 September

Final positions
- Champions: M: Geelong Supercats; W: Ballarat Miners
- Runners-up: M: Dandenong Rangers; W: Bendigo Braves

The 2006 ABA National Finals brought together the best men's and women's basketball teams from the Waratah League, South East Australian Basketball League (SEABL), Queensland Australian Basketball League (QABL), Central Australian Basketball League (CABL) and Big V competitions for their shot at national glory, with the event held at the Broadmeadow Basketball Stadium in Newcastle, New South Wales.

Australia's largest basketball competition, the Australian Basketball Association (ABA), commenced in March with 116 teams competing across six states and territories (Victoria, New South Wales, Queensland, South Australia, Tasmania and ACT) culminating in the National Finals in September in Newcastle.

In a weekend of top-level basketball, the Geelong Supercats and Ballarat Miners were triumphant in the men's and women's finals. The 2006 ABA National Finals were hosted by Newcastle Basketball Association and Basketball New South Wales.

== Tournament overview ==
The Geelong Supercats were back on top in 2006 with a comprehensive 94–80 triumph over the Dandenong Rangers in the men's Grand Final. Mark Leader's team played with a purpose, order and discipline that simply left their rivals with few solutions. The men from Dandenong looked in serious trouble down 53–40 at the half. However, the Rangers put their troubled zone defence away to start the second half and their shooters found some touch, in particular Grand Final MVP Ash Cannan (21 points & 19 rebounds). But so did Geelong's, and the teams simply traded baskets in the brightest scoring period of the game. Powerful offensive rebounding allowed Dandenong to hang on by a thread but try as they might the Rangers could not sufficiently upset the Supercats. At the final siren, the game's most controlled side relaxed their guard completely and the scenes of celebration were unrestrained. Jamal Brown top scored for the Supercats with 21 points, closely followed by Jason Reardon with 20 points.

The Ballarat Miners showed superb composure to claim back-to-back ABA National titles in 2006. They patiently whittled away at an 11-point Bendigo lead to grind out a 69–66 win. Ballarat centre Karen Ashby (24 points, 15 rebounds & 7 assists) was awarded the Grand Final MVP, with a measured performance, showing great poise throughout the game as Bendigo constantly double-teamed her. The Miners were sharp in their execution, getting consecutive baskets from a flex offence. Bendigo threw everything at Ballarat in the dying stages but the Miners hung on for the win and the title.

== Participants ==
To qualify for the event, teams had to be crowned Champion of their respective Leagues. There were also a number of wildcard entries.

=== League champions ===
| League | Men | Women |
|---|---|---|
| Big V | Dandenong Rangers | Sandringham Sabres |
| CABL | Forestville Eagles | Sturt Sabres |
| QABL | Southern Districts Spartans | Southern Districts Spartans |
| SEABL | Knox Raiders (South) & Geelong Supercats (East) | Bendigo Braves |
| Waratah | Sutherland Sharks | Bankstown Bruins |

=== Wildcards ===
| League | Men | Women |
|---|---|---|
| Big V | Sandringham Sabres | Dandenong Rangers |
| CABL | | |
| QABL | | |
| SEABL | | Ballarat Miners |
| Waratah | Newcastle Hunters | Sydney Comets |

== Results ==
=== Quarter-finals – men ===
1 September
2:00 p.m.
Court 7

| Dandenong Rangers | 110–98 | Forestville Eagles |
| Pts: L. Strong 27 | | Pts: B. Sullivan 22 |

Broadmeadow Basketball Stadium, Newcastle, New South Wales

1 September
6:00 p.m.
Show Court

| Sandringham Sabres | 93–90 | Sutherland Sharks |
| Pts: N. Crosswell 22 | | Pts: C. Tovey 29 |

Broadmeadow Basketball Stadium, Newcastle, New South Wales

1 September
6:30 p.m.
Court 7

| Geelong Supercats | 100–92 | Southern Districts Spartans |
| Pts: S. Myers 27 | | Pts: B. Thompson 23 |

Broadmeadow Basketball Stadium, Newcastle, New South Wales

1 September
8:15 p.m.
Show Court

| Knox Raiders | 132–80 | Newcastle Hunters |
| Pts: C. Massingale 51 |

Broadmeadow Basketball Stadium, Newcastle, New South Wales

=== Quarter-finals – women ===
1 September
1:30 p.m.
Show Court

| Sandringham Sabres | 52–50 | Southern Districts Spartans |
| Pts: T. Fowler 14 | | Pts: H. Smith 22 |

Broadmeadow Basketball Stadium, Newcastle, New South Wales

1 September
3:45 p.m.
Show Court

| Bankstown Bruins | 71–58 | Sturt Sabres |
| Pts: D. Samuels 27 | | Pts: C. Nixon 25 |

Broadmeadow Basketball Stadium, Newcastle, New South Wales

1 September
4:15 p.m.
Court 7

| Ballarat Miners | 72–69 | Dandenong Rangers |
| Pts: K. Ashby 29 | | Pts: M. Colcott 29 |

Broadmeadow Basketball Stadium, Newcastle, New South Wales

1 September
8:45 p.m.
Court 7

| Bendigo Braves | 79–70 | Sydney Comets |
| Pts: A. Walsh 31 | | Pts: S. Batista De Mello 22 |

Broadmeadow Basketball Stadium, Newcastle, New South Wales

=== Classification Games – men ===
2 September
12:00 p.m.
Court 7

| Forestville Eagles | 108–93 | Sutherland Sharks |
| Pts: B. Sullivan 33 | | Pts: C. Tovey 26 |

Broadmeadow Basketball Stadium, Newcastle, New South Wales

2 September
2:30 p.m.
Show Court

| Southern Districts Spartans | 115–91 | Newcastle Hunters |
| Pts: B. Thompson 28 | | Pts: M. Selwood 16 |

Broadmeadow Basketball Stadium, Newcastle, New South Wales

=== Classification Games – women ===
2 September
12:15 p.m.
Show Court

| Sturt Sabres | 81–45 | Sydney Comets |
| Pts: M. Bowley 17 | | Pts: S. Batista De Mello 13 |

Broadmeadow Basketball Stadium, Newcastle, New South Wales

2 September
2:15 p.m.
Court 7

| Southern Districts Spartans | 77–70 | Dandenong Rangers |
| Pts: K. Dalgleish 19 | | Pts: M. Colcott 24 |

Broadmeadow Basketball Stadium, Newcastle, New South Wales

=== Semi-finals – men ===
2 September
4:30 p.m.
Court 7

| Dandenong Rangers | 103–89 | Sandringham Sabres |
| Pts: S. Conn 20 | | Pts: N. Crosswell 35 |

Broadmeadow Basketball Stadium, Newcastle, New South Wales

2 September
7:00 p.m.
Show Court

| Geelong Supercats | 93–81 | Knox Raiders |
| Pts: J. Brown 23 | | Pts: G. Siegle 20 |

Broadmeadow Basketball Stadium, Newcastle, New South Wales

=== Semi-finals – women ===
2 September
4:45 p.m.
Show Court

| Bendigo Braves | 95–89 | Bankstown Bruins |
| Pts: A. Walsh 34 | | Pts: W. Strong 23 |

Broadmeadow Basketball Stadium, Newcastle, New South Wales

2 September
6:45 p.m.
Court 7

| Ballarat Miners | 76–60 | Sandringham Sabres |
| Pts: R. Sewell 14 | | Pts: T. Fowler 16 |

Broadmeadow Basketball Stadium, Newcastle, New South Wales

=== Grand Finals ===
3 September

| Geelong Supercats | 94–80 | Dandenong Rangers |
| Pts: J. Brown 21 | | Pts: A. Cannan 21 |

Broadmeadow Basketball Stadium, Newcastle, New South Wales

3 September

| Ballarat Miners | 69–66 | Bendigo Braves |
| Pts: K. Ashby 24 | | Pts: K. Lemezs 19 |

Broadmeadow Basketball Stadium, Newcastle, New South Wales

== All-Star Five ==
=== Men ===
- Grand Final MVP: Ash Cannan (Dandenong Rangers)

| Name | Team |
|---|---|
| Cameron Tovey | Sutherland Sharks |
| Lester Strong | Dandenong Rangers |
| C. J. Massingale | Knox Raiders |
| Nathan Crosswell | Sandringham Sabres |
| Jamal Brown | Geelong Supercats |

=== Women ===
| Name | Team |
|---|---|
| Dani Samuels | Bankstown Bruins |
| Monique Bowley | Sturt Sabres |
| Karen Ashby (Grand Final MVP) | Ballarat Miners |
| Rachelle Sewell | Ballarat Miners |
| Andrea Walsh | Bendigo Braves |
