= Nathan Jawai =

Australian basketball player (born 1986)

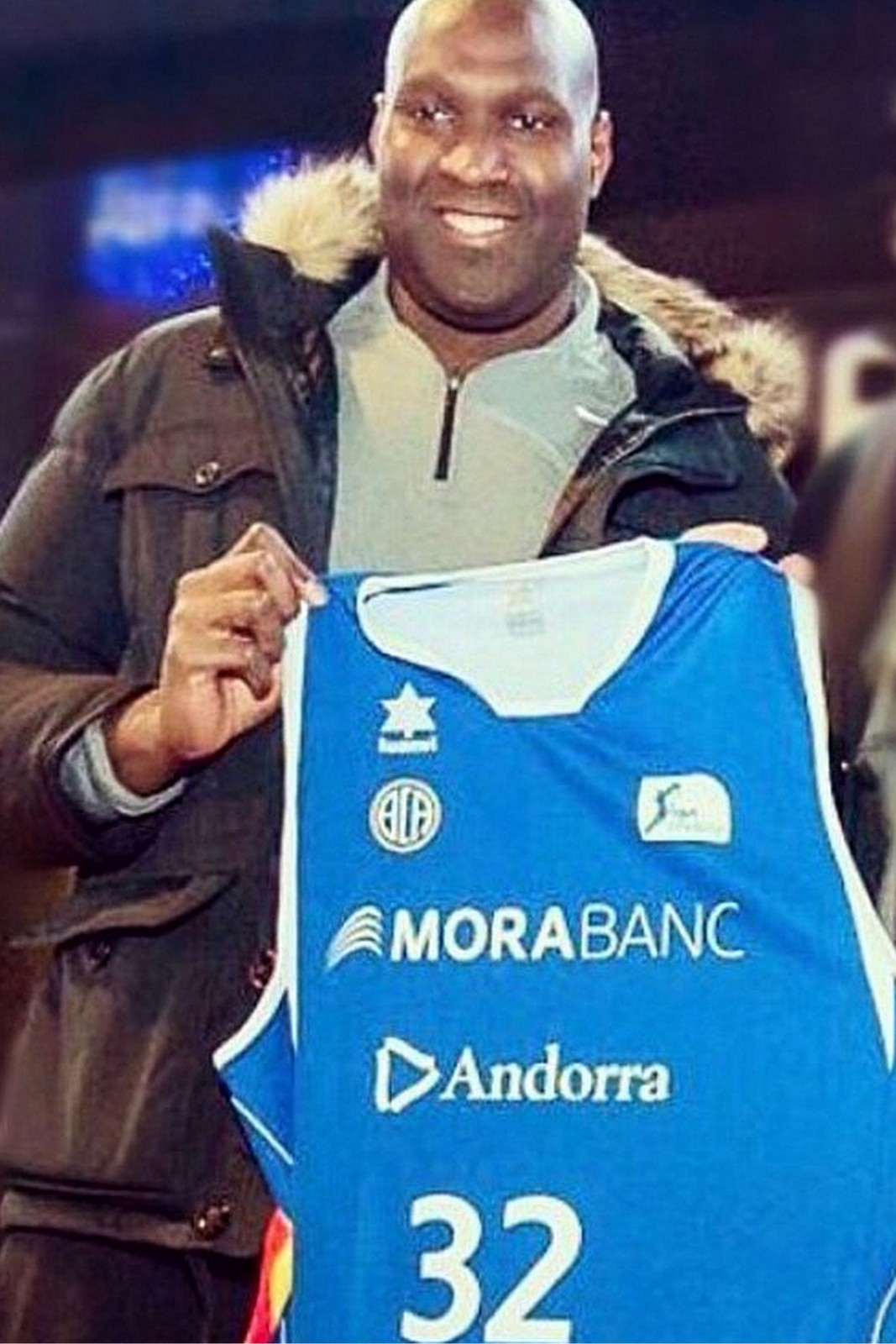
- Jawai in 2014

Personal information
- Born: 10 October 1986 (age 40) Sydney, New South Wales, Australia
- Listed height: 209 cm (6 ft 10 in)
- Listed weight: 130 kg (287 lb)

Career information
- High school: St Augustine's College (Cairns, Queensland)
- College: Midland (2006–2007)
- NBA draft: 2008: 2nd round, 41st overall pick
- Drafted by: Indiana Pacers
- Playing career: 2004–2024
- Position: Power forward / center

Career history
- 2004: Cairns Marlins
- 2005–2006: Australian Institute of Sport
- 2007: Cairns Marlins
- 2007–2008: Cairns Taipans
- 2008–2009: Toronto Raptors
- 2009: →Idaho Stampede
- 2009–2010: Minnesota Timberwolves
- 2010: →Sioux Falls Skyforce
- 2010–2011: Partizan Belgrade
- 2011–2012: UNICS Kazan
- 2012: Cairns Marlins
- 2012–2013: Barcelona
- 2013–2014: Galatasaray Liv Hospital
- 2014–2015: MoraBanc Andorra
- 2015–2016: Perth Wildcats
- 2016–2022: Cairns Taipans
- 2019: Levallois Metropolitans
- 2021: Cairns Marlins
- 2022–2024: Darwin Salties

Career highlights
- NBL champion (2016); Copa del Rey de Baloncesto winner (2013); Serbian League champion (2011); Radivoj Korać Cup winner (2011); Adriatic League champion (2011); ABA League Finals MVP (2011); NBL Rookie of the Year (2008); All-NBL Second Team (2008); NBL All-Star Game MVP (2008); 2× QBL champion (2004, 2007); 2× ABA champion (2004, 2007); ABA All-Star Five (2007)
- Stats at NBA.com
- Stats at Basketball Reference

Nathan Leon Jawai (born 10 October 1986) is an Australian former professional basketball player. Jawai first played for the Cairns Marlins in the Queensland Basketball League in 2004, before heading to Canberra the following year to attend the Australian Institute of Sport. He went on to play for the Cairns Taipans in the National Basketball League before being drafted by the Indiana Pacers in the 2008 NBA draft. Two years later he joined Partizan Belgrade in Serbia, then Barcelona and Turkey, before heading back home to Australia and winning an NBL championship with the Perth Wildcats in 2016. Standing at 209 cm, he played at the power forward and centre positions.

Jawai played for the Australian Boomers at the 2014 FIBA World Cup.

== Early life ==
Jawai was born in Sydney, New South Wales, in the suburb of Paddington, on 10 October 1986, to parents Ron and Lynette. He grew up in Bamaga, 40 km from the tip of Cape York Peninsula. In Bamaga, a small town of about 1000 people, his father was the local police sergeant. He is an Indigenous Australian of Torres Strait Islander descent.

Like most children on Cape York, he played rugby league throughout primary school and early high school. However, living in a remote indigenous community meant Jawai was subject to a lot of bad influences and was often getting in trouble due to the stain of drug and alcohol abuse. Strong parental guidance and the decision to send Jawai to high school at St Augustine's College in Cairns ensured he stayed away from bad influences. At the age of 15, Jawai began playing basketball, and it only took him two years until he began playing competitively for the Cairns Marlins of the Queensland Basketball League in 2004. He then spent 2005 and 2006 at the Australian Institute of Sport in Canberra playing for the AIS men's team in the South East Australian Basketball League (SEABL) before venturing to the United States to play college basketball for Midland College in 2006–07. However, after just one season with Midland, Jawai returned to Australia and had surgery to remove the meniscus in his right knee. With his move back home, he had hopes of joining an NBL club. He subsequently re-joined the Cairns Marlins and helped guide them to a national title in 2007 while earning ACC All-Star Five honours.

== Professional career ==
=== Cairns Taipans ===
Jawai joined the Cairns Taipans for the 2007–08 NBL season. In 31 games for the Taipans, Jawai averaged 17.3 points, 9.4 rebounds and 1.9 assists per game. His season highs for points and rebounds was 28 and 18 respectively.

=== NBA ===
Jawai was drafted 41st overall in the 2008 NBA draft by the Indiana Pacers; however, his rights were traded to the Toronto Raptors in a deal that also brought Jermaine O'Neal to Toronto in exchange for T. J. Ford, Rasho Nesterović, Maceo Baston, and the draft rights to Roy Hibbert. On 11 July 2008, he signed a two-year deal with the Raptors, and the nicknames soon rolled in with "Aussie Shaq", "Outback Shaq" and "Baby Shaq", due to his resemblance to Shaquille O'Neal. He was also nicknamed "Big Nate" by Toronto commentators.

On 17 December 2008, Jawai was cleared to resume training after enduring a worrisome period in which he was not allowed to undergo physical activity. Jawai was required to 'rest', due to a routine pre-season test which revealed a cardiac abnormality. On 21 January 2009, Jawai made his NBA debut against the Detroit Pistons at The Palace of Auburn Hills, becoming the first indigenous Australian to play in the NBA.

On 26 February 2009, Jawai was assigned by the Raptors to the Idaho Stampede of the NBA Development League. In his first start (his second game), he registered 12 points, 5 rebounds and a team-high 3 blocks in Idaho's 104–96 win over the Utah Flash. Jawai was recalled from the D-League on 23 March 2009.

On 9 July 2009, Jawai was traded to the Dallas Mavericks as a part of the four-team trade that also involved the Orlando Magic and Memphis Grizzlies. Later that year, on 20 October 2009, Jawai was traded to the Minnesota Timberwolves in exchange for a conditional second-round pick in the 2012 NBA draft.

On 8 November 2009, Jawai played arguably the best game of his NBA career, scoring a team-high 16 points and grabbing six rebounds in a game against the Portland Trail Blazers.

On 19 February 2010, Jawai was sent to the Sioux Falls Skyforce of the NBA D-League for a short stint. He was recalled on 21 February 2010, and sent back on 31 March 2010.

=== Europe ===
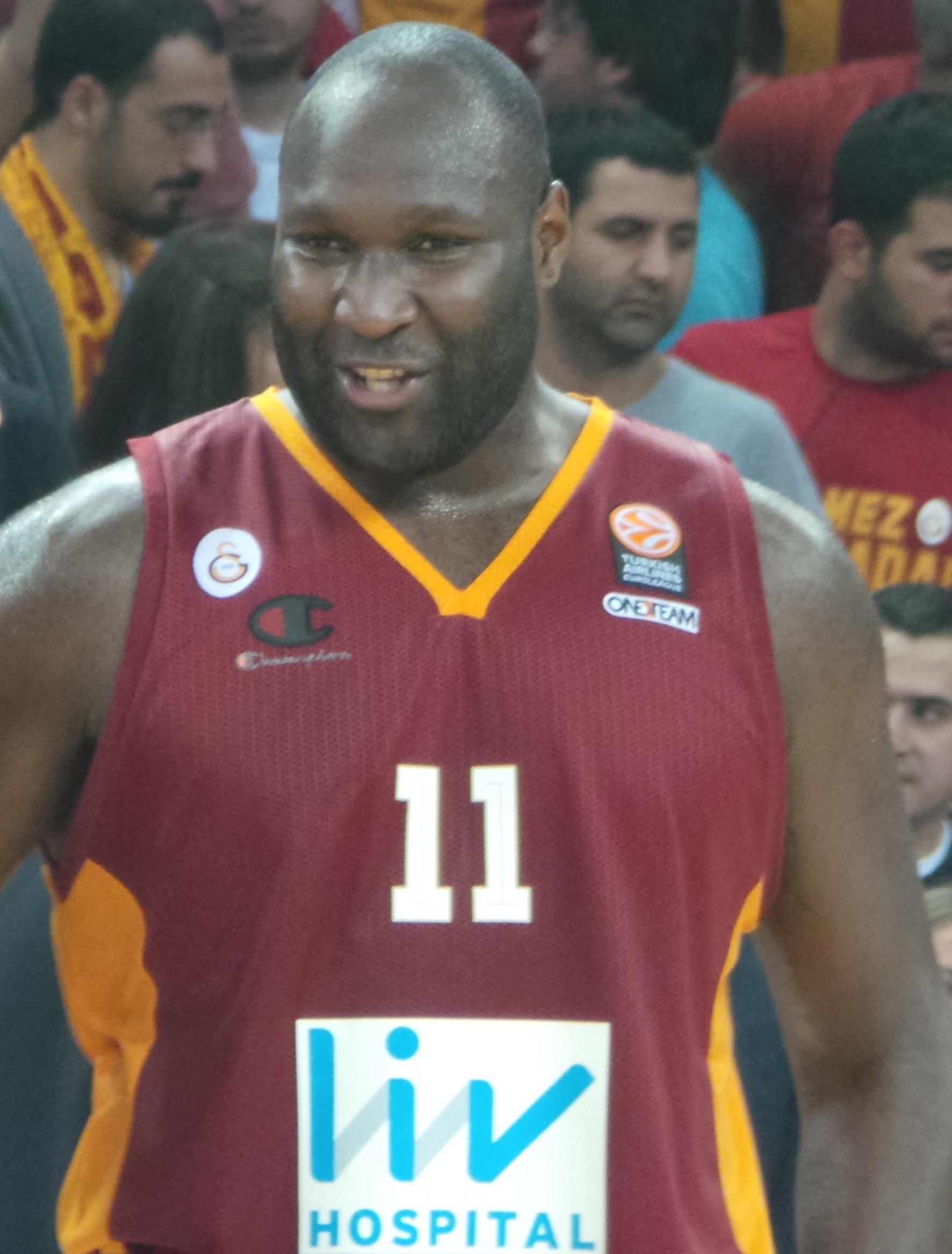
Jawai with Galatasaray Liv Hospital in October 2013

On 18 August 2010, Jawai signed a one-year deal with the Serbian team Partizan Belgrade.

In June 2011, Jawai signed a deal with the Russian team UNICS Kazan. Following the conclusion of Kazan's season, Jawai returned to Cairns and joined the Marlins for a two-game stint.

In July 2012, Jawai signed with Barcelona Regal of the Liga ACB for the 2012–13 season.

In July 2013, Jawai signed with the Turkish team Galatasaray Liv Hospital. In October 2013, he sustained a traumatic neck injury while playing for Galatasaray. He had long-lasting effects because of the incident and temporarily couldn't see from one eye. He subsequently managed just four total games for Galatasaray in 2013–14. Despite the circumstances, Jawai re-signed with the club in September 2014. In December 2014, he left Galatasaray and signed with MoraBanc Andorra for the rest of the season.

=== Perth Wildcats ===
On 28 August 2015, Jawai signed with the Perth Wildcats for the 2015–16 NBL season. On 10 October 2015, Jawai made his debut for the Wildcats in the team's season opener, where he recorded 11 points and six rebounds in 21 minutes in a 79–66 win over the Adelaide 36ers. On 22 November 2015, he scored a season-high 20 points in a 91–90 win over his former team, the Cairns Taipans. On 21 January 2016, he had his best game in two months, scoring 18 points in a 95–72 win over the Illawarra Hawks. The Wildcats finished the regular season in second place with an 18–10 record and reached the NBL Grand Final series, where they defeated the New Zealand Breakers 2–1. Jawai appeared in 32 of the team's 34 games in 2015–16, averaging 10.3 points, 4.1 rebounds and 1.8 assists per game.

=== Second stint with Cairns and return to Europe ===
On 3 June 2016, Jawai signed a three-year deal with the Cairns Taipans, returning to the club he began his career with in 2007. A major factor in his return to Cairns was his long-time mentor and Taipans head coach Aaron Fearne. On 3 August 2016, he was ruled out for the entire NBL pre-season following finger surgery. On 5 February 2017, he scored a season-high 22 points in an 85–77 win over the Perth Wildcats.

On 10 October 2017, Jawai was ruled out for 12 weeks after suffering a partial tear of a ligament in his left foot in the Taipans' 2017–18 season opener four days earlier.

On 3 April 2018, Jawai took up his player option with the Taipans for the 2018–19 season.

On 17 February 2019, Jawai signed with French team Levallois Metropolitans for the rest of the 2018–19 Pro A season. In 14 games, he averaged 5.8 points and 2.3 rebounds per game.

On 4 August 2019, Jawai re-signed with the Taipans for the 2019–20 NBL season.

On 3 August 2020, Jawai re-signed again with the Taipans on a two-year deal.

On 9 June 2021, Jawai joined the Cairns Marlins of the NBL1 North, marking his fourth stint with the team.

Jawai missed most of February of the 2021–22 NBL season after suffering a partial Grade 2 tear of his right adductor. He parted ways with the Taipans following the season.

=== Darwin Salties ===
In May 2022, Jawai joined the Darwin Salties for their inaugural season in the NBL1 North.

In February 2023, Jawai re-signed with the Salties for the 2023 NBL1 North season.

In March 2024, Jawai re-signed with the Salties for the 2024 NBL1 North season.

In June 2025, Jawai was named in an Indigenous Basketball Australia All-Stars team for an exhibition match against Maori Basketball New Zealand. It marked his final competitive basketball game.

== Career statistics ==
Legend
| GP | Games played | GS | Games started | MPG | Minutes per game |
| FG% | Field-goal percentage | 3P% | 3-point field-goal percentage | FT% | Free-throw percentage |
| RPG | Rebounds per game | APG | Assists per game | SPG | Steals per game |
| BPG | Blocks per game | PPG | Points per game | PIR | Performance index rating |
| **Bold** | Career high |

=== NBA ===
==== Regular season ====
| Year | Team | GP | GS | MPG | FG% | 3P% | FT% | RPG | APG | SPG | BPG | PPG |
|---|---|---|---|---|---|---|---|---|---|---|---|---|
| 2008–09 | Toronto | 6 | 0 | 3.2 | .250 | .000 | .000 | .3 | .0 | .0 | .0 | .3 |
| 2009–10 | Minnesota | **39** | **2** | **10.6** | **.441** | .000 | **.684** | **2.7** | **.6** | **.3** | **.2** | **3.2** |
| Career | | 45 | 2 | 9.6 | .435 | .000 | .684 | 2.4 | .5 | .2 | .2 | 2.8 |

=== Euroleague ===
| Year | Team | GP | GS | MPG | FG% | 3P% | FT% | RPG | APG | SPG | BPG | PPG | PIR |
|---|---|---|---|---|---|---|---|---|---|---|---|---|---|
| 2010–11 | Partizan | 16 | 7 | **22.9** | .459 | .000 | **.786** | **5.0** | **.9** | **.6** | .7 | 9.1 | 10.7 |
| 2011–12 | UNICS | 15 | **10** | 14.1 | .547 | .000 | .643 | 4.3 | .3 | .3 | .5 | 7.3 | 5.7 |
| 2012–13 | Barcelona | **30** | 6 | 15.5 | .697 | .000 | .710 | 4.7 | .4 | .3 | **.8** | 7.1 | 9.1 |
| 2013–14 | Galatasaray | 2 | 0 | 14.7 | **.875** | .000 | .727 | 2.5 | .5 | .5 | .5 | **11.0** | **14.0** |
| Career | | 63 | 23 | 17.0 | .582 | .000 | .790 | 4.6 | .5 | .4 | .7 | 7.8 | 8.9 |

== National team career ==
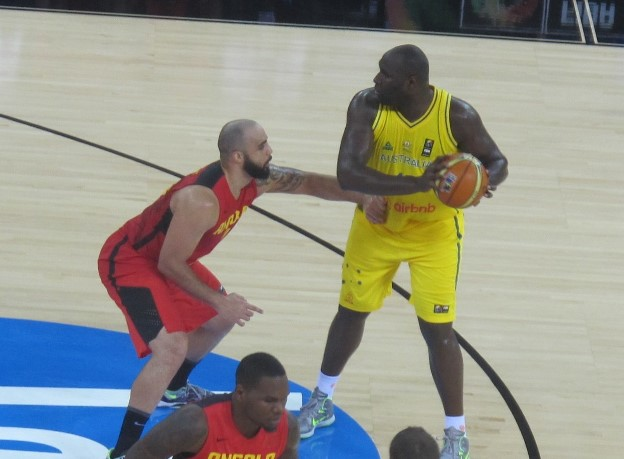
Jawai playing for Australia at the 2014 FIBA World Cup.

Jawai debuted for Australia at the 2005 FIBA Under-21 World Championship. He represented the Australian Boomers at the 2009 FIBA Oceania Championship, 2014 FIBA World Cup, and 2015 FIBA Oceania Championship.

In November 2018, Jawai was called up to the Boomers squad for the team's next window of 2019 FIBA World Cup qualifiers.

== Personal life ==
Jawai is the cousin of NBA basketball player Patty Mills. Jawai's uncle is former Olympian basketballer Danny Morseu. Jawai's great uncle is Indigenous land rights activist Eddie Mabo.

Jawai has two daughters.

== See also ==
- List of foreign basketball players in Serbia
