= Nathan Crosswell =

Retired Australian basketball player

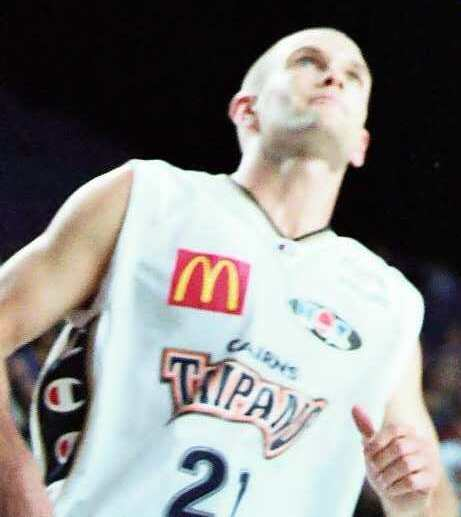
- Crosswell with the Cairns Taipans during the 2004–05 season

Personal information
- Born: 3 August 1979 (age 47) Ballina, New South Wales
- Listed height: 190 cm (6 ft 3 in)
- Listed weight: 89 kg (196 lb)

Career information
- High school: Ballina
- Playing career: 1999–2013
- Position: Guard

Career history
- 1999–2002: Melbourne Tigers
- 2002–2005: Victoria Giants
- 2005–2007: Cairns Taipans
- 2007–2010: Melbourne Tigers
- 2010–2011: Townsville Crocodiles
- 2011–2013: Adelaide 36ers

Career highlights
- NBL champion (2008); ABA Finals All-Star Five (2006)

Nathan Crosswell (born 3 August 1979) is an Australian former professional basketball player who played in the National Basketball League from 1999 to 2013. During his 14-year career in the NBL, Crosswell played for the Melbourne Tigers, Victoria Giants, Cairns Taipans, Townsville Crocodiles and Adelaide 36ers. Crosswell won his only NBL championship with the Tigers in the 2007–08 NBL season.

== Professional career ==
Crosswell started his NBL career with the Melbourne Tigers in 1999. He later played for the Victoria Giants and Cairns Taipans before re-joining the Tigers in 2007 and winning his only NBL championship. He joined the Townsville Crocodiles in 2010 before finishing his career with the Adelaide 36ers. His first season in Adelaide was cut short after suffering an Achilles tendon injury in round 10 against the New Zealand Breakers.

Crosswell announced his retirement from the NBL on 20 March 2013, playing his 350th and last NBL game just three days later on 23 March.

Throughout his NBL career and after his NBL career ended, Crosswell played in the SEABL and Big V.
