= Alex Loughton =

Australian basketball player (born 1983)

Personal information
- Born: 3 May 1983 (age 43) Perth, Western Australia, Australia
- Listed height: 206 cm (6 ft 9 in)
- Listed weight: 106 kg (234 lb)

Career information
- High school: St Stephen's School (Perth, Western Australia)
- College: Old Dominion (2002–2006)
- NBA draft: 2006: undrafted
- Playing career: 2000–2021
- Position: Power forward / center

Career history
- 2000–2002: Wanneroo Wolves
- 2001: Australian Institute of Sport
- 2006–2007: Aguas Gandia
- 2007–2009: Perth Wildcats
- 2008–2009: Wanneroo Wolves
- 2009–2010: Ourense Baloncesto
- 2010–2019: Cairns Taipans
- 2016–2017: Cairns Marlins
- 2017–2018: Perth Redbacks
- 2019, 2021: Cairns Marlins

Career highlights
- All-NBL Third Team (2011); QBL champion (2016); CAA Player of the Year (2005); 2× First-team All-CAA (2004, 2005); Second-team All-CAA (2006); CAA All-Defensive Team (2005); CAA All-Rookie Team (2003)

Alexander Michael Loughton (born 3 May 1983) is an Australian former professional basketball player.

== Junior and college career ==
As a junior, Loughton played basketball with the Wanneroo Basketball Association. He played for the Wolves' SBL team between 2000 and 2002, while also spending a season with the Australian Institute of Sport in the SEABL in 2001. Additionally, with the Australian Under-20 team, he averaged 17.4 points and 10.3 rebounds.

In 2002, Loughton moved to the United States to play college basketball for Old Dominion University. In 124 games over four seasons, he made 120 starts and averaged 13.3 points, 7.7 rebounds, 1.5 assists and 1.3 steals in 28.1 minutes per game. As a junior in 2004–05, he was named CAA Player of the Year. In October 2009, Loughton was named to the CAA's 25th Anniversary Team. Three months later, he was named to the Collegeinsider.com Mid Major All-Decade team.

== Professional career ==
=== Early career (2006–2010) ===
After going undrafted in the 2006 NBA draft, Loughton played for the Orlando Magic during the Pepsi Pro Summer League. He later moved to Spain to begin his professional career, joining Aguas Gandia for the 2006–07 season, where he averaged 15.5 points, 5.7 rebounds and 1.1 assists in 34 games.

In April 2007, Loughton signed a two-year deal with the Perth Wildcats. During his time in Perth, he had short stints with the Wanneroo Wolves in 2008 and 2009.

In September 2009, Loughton returned to Spain, signing with Ourense Baloncesto for the 2009–10 season.

=== Cairns Taipans and Cairns Marlins (2010–present) ===
Loughton joined the Cairns Taipans in 2010, where he remained for the next nine years. In his first season with the Taipans, he helped them reach the 2011 NBL Grand Final, where they lost 2–1 to the New Zealand Breakers. In 2015, he helped the Taipans win their first ever minor premiership and reach their second NBL Grand Final, where they again lost to the Breakers, this time in straight sets.

In 2016, Loughton helped the Cairns Marlins win the QBL championship.

In March 2017, Loughton joined the Perth Redbacks of the State Basketball League, where he had a three-week, four-game stint. He subsequently returned to Cairns and re-joined the Marlins as an injury replacement for Stephen Weigh. Loughton returned to the Redbacks in 2018 for another short stint.

In January 2019, Loughton played his 300th NBL game. On 2 February 2019, he announced he would be retiring from the NBL at the conclusion of the 2018–19 season.

In 2021, Loughton returned to play for the Marlins in the new NBL1 North competition.

== Personal ==
Loughton and his wife Michelle have three children: Liam, Georgia and Ivy.

Loughton has a video and social media production business called Power Forward Media.
