= Brent Hobba =

Australian basketball player

Personal information
- Born: 10 March 1982 (age 44)
- Listed height: 205 cm (6 ft 9 in)
- Listed weight: 108 kg (238 lb)

Career information
- College: Colorado Christian (2001–2005)
- Playing career: 1998–2019
- Position: Power forward / Centre

Career history
- 1998–2000: Goldfields Giants
- 2001: Willetton Tigers
- 2002: Goldfields Giants
- 2005: Goldfields Giants
- 2005–2006: Perth Wildcats
- 2006–2014: Dandenong Rangers
- 2006–2008: South Dragons
- 2015–2019: Casey Cavaliers

Career highlights
- SEABL champion (2013); 2× Big V champion (2006, 2007); ACC All-Star Five (2007)

Brent Hobba (born 10 March 1982) is an Australian former basketball player who played three seasons in the National Basketball League (NBL). He also had a long career in the Australian state leagues.

== NBL and State League career ==
From 1998 to 2000, Hobba played in the State Basketball League (SBL) for the Goldfields Giants. After a lone season with the Willetton Tigers in 2001, he returned to the Giants in 2002. Between 2001 and 2005, he played four years of college basketball in the United States for Colorado Christian University. In his senior year, he played 28 games and averaged 15.7 points, 7.3 rebounds and 1.4 assists, shooting at 52.4% from the field in 28 minutes per game. He had another stint with the Giants in 2005.

Hobba spent the 2005–06 NBL season as a development player with the Perth Wildcats. Between 2006 and 2008, he played two seasons with the South Dragons. He trialed with the New Zealand Breakers in the lead up to the 2008–09 NBL season, but was unsuccessful.

Between 2006 and 2014, Hobba played in the Big V and South East Australian Basketball League (SEABL) for the Dandenong Rangers. Between 2015 and 2019, he played in the Big V for the Casey Cavaliers.

== National team career ==
Hobba was a member of the Australian U18 National Team in 2000 that played at the Albert Schweitzer Junior Championships in Mannheim, Germany. He was also a member of the Australian team at the 2005 World University Games in İzmir, Turkey.

== Personal life ==
As of 2015, Hobba and his wife have two children and live in Ferntree Gully, Victoria. He worked as a teacher at Cranbourne East Secondary College. Hobba then moved to Berwick Secondary College in the summer of 2019.
