= James Mitchell (basketball) =

Australian basketball player (born 1991)

No. 37 – Cairns Marlins
- Position: Shooting guard / small forward
- League: NBL1 North

Personal information
- Born: 15 January 1991 (age 35) Kogarah, New South Wales, Australia
- Listed height: 194 cm (6 ft 4 in)

Career information
- Playing career: 2010–present

Career history
- 2010–2013: Cairns Marlins
- 2010–2013: Cairns Taipans
- 2015–2016: Cairns Marlins
- 2017–2019: Rockhampton Rockets
- 2017–2018: Sheffield Sharks
- 2021–2022; 2025–: Cairns Marlins

Career highlights
- QBL champion (2016)

James Robert Mitchell (born 15 January 1991) is an Australian professional basketball player for the Cairns Marlins of the NBL1 North. Between 2010 and 2016, he was based in his hometown of Cairns playing for the Marlins in the QBL and the Taipans in the NBL. Between 2017 and 2019, he played three seasons for the Rockhampton Rockets in the QBL and spent a season in England with the Sheffield Sharks. In 2021, he re-joined the Marlins.

== Early life ==
Mitchell was born in Kogarah, New South Wales and raised in the Cairns suburb of Redlynch.

When Mitchell was 11 years old, having just finished Year 6 at Redlynch State School, his parents – John and Salli Mitchell – were killed in a head-on collision near Proserpine, four days short of Christmas on 21 December 2002. Salli was a tuckshop convenor at Redlynch State School and the coach of four junior basketball teams at Redlynch Basketball Club. John was a truck driver with Boral in Cairns. They were driving south to Sydney to join James and his then 14-year-old sister Kate – who had flown down to join their grandparents for Christmas – when they lost their lives in a horrific collision, which also killed three people in the other car. A park was dedicated to the memory of Mitchell's parents in Redlynch, the Salli and John Mitchell Memorial Park. Despite an offer to move in with their grandparents in Sydney, James and Kate remained in Cairns and were cared for by older sister Sam.

== Basketball career ==
=== Cairns Marlins and Taipans (2010–2013) ===
After winning a place in the Taipans Academy in 2009, Mitchell played for the Cairns Marlins of the Queensland Basketball League in 2010 and won a development player contract with the Cairns Taipans for the 2010/11 NBL season. By December 2010, he was studying physical education at James Cook University in tandem with his Taipans duties, having made his NBL debut on 13 November 2010 against the Gold Coast Blaze. Mitchell spent three seasons with the Taipans as a development player, playing in five games in 2010/11, four games in 2011/12, and one game in 2012/13. He also continued to play for the Marlins in 2011, 2012 and 2013.

=== Post-Taipans stint (2015–2016) ===
After a knee injury ruled him out of the entire 2014 QBL season, an injury which sidelined him for about 18 months, Mitchell returned to the Cairns Marlins in 2015 and was appointed team captain. In 2016, he captained the Marlins to their first QBL Championship since 2009.

Mitchell was often regarded as the heart of the Marlins program; with Taipans development players coming and going over the years, Mitchell was always a consistent presence. However, when negotiating with the Marlins in March 2017 ahead of the 2017 season, Mitchell sought remuneration, having gone unpaid with the Marlins for his entire career. Following a breakdown between Mitchell and Cairns Basketball boss Mike Scott, Mitchell parted ways with the Marlins.

=== Rockhampton Rockets (2017–2019) ===
On 27 March 2017, Mitchell signed with the Rockhampton Rockets for the 2017 QBL season. Mitchell, who was in the final stages of finishing his teaching degree at the time of signing with the Rockets, flew in and out to Rockhampton in the first part of the season before moving south. After a slow start to the 2017 season, the Rockets charged into the finals with an end-of-season run that saw them eliminate the top seed Brisbane Capitals in the quarter-finals before eventually succumbing to the Mackay Meteors in the semi-finals.

On 17 November 2017, Mitchell re-signed with the Rockets for the 2018 season. He was named player of the week for round one. He appeared in all 19 games for the Rockets in 2018, averaging 14.5 points, 7.0 rebounds, 5.3 assists and 2.4 steals per game.

In November 2018, Mitchell re-signed with the Rockets for the 2019 season. In 19 games, he averaged 10.3 points, 6.2 rebounds, 3.9 assists and 2.3 steals per game.

=== Sheffield Sharks (2017–2018) ===
On 22 November 2017, Mitchell signed with the Sheffield Sharks of the British Basketball League for the rest of the 2017–18 season. In 11 games for Sheffield, he averaged 1.2 points and 1.4 rebounds per game.

=== Return to the Cairns Marlins (2021–2022; 2025–) ===
Mitchell re-joined the Cairns Marlins, now in the NBL1 North, for the 2021 NBL1 season. He helped the Marlins reach the best-of-three grand final series, where they were defeated 2–0 by the Mackay Meteors.

Mitchell re-joined the Marlins for the 2022 NBL1 North season. After not playing in 2023 and 2024, he returned to the Marlins for the 2025 NBL1 North season. He re-signed with the Marlins for the 2026 season.
