= Jeff Hopgood =

Australian rules footballer

Personal information
- Full name: Jeff Hopgood
- Born: 14 January 1948
- Died: 8 November 2006 (aged 58); Gold Coast
- Original team: Bayswater (Victoria)
- Height: 191 cm (6 ft 3 in)
- Weight: 93 kg (205 lb)
- Position: Ruckman

Playing career^{1}
Years	Club	Games (Goals)
1968–1973	North Melbourne	42 (18)
- ^{1} Playing statistics correct to the end of 1973.

Jeff Hopgood (14 January 1948 – 8 November 2006) was an Australian rules footballer who played with North Melbourne in the Victorian Football League (VFL).

Hopgood spent six season at North Melbourne without ever managing to cement his spot, although he did manage 16 games in 1972. After leaving North Melbourne, Hopgood played at Coburg and was a ruckman in their 1974 VFA premiership side.

He later became influential in the Cairns sporting scene, serving as the president of AFL Cairns and the inaugural chairman of the Cairns Taipans basketball team, of which he was a co-founder.

Affectionately known as Hoppy, he was killed in November 2006 when his four-wheel drive crashed into a tree near the Gold Coast.
