= Aaron Grabau =

Australian basketball player (born 1978)

Personal information
- Born: 8 February 1978 (age 48) Melbourne, Victoria, Australia
- Listed height: 196 cm (6 ft 5 in)
- Listed weight: 98 kg (216 lb)

Career information
- Playing career: 1996–2013
- Position: Guard

Career history
- 1996: Geelong Supercats
- 1997: Mackay Meteors
- 1998–2009; 2012: Cairns Marlins
- 1999–2013: Cairns Taipans

Career highlights
- 3× ABA National champion (1998, 2004, 2007); 5× QBL champion (1998, 2001, 2004, 2007, 2009); 2× ABA Grand Final MVP (2004, 2007); 4× QBL All-League Team (2004, 2007, 2009, 2012); QBL Youth Player of the Year (1997); No. 8 retired by Cairns Taipans

Aaron Grabau (born 8 February 1978) is an Australian former professional basketball player. He played 14 seasons for the Cairns Taipans of the National Basketball League (NBL).

== Early life ==
Grabau was born in Melbourne, Victoria, and played as a junior for the Dandenong Rangers.

== Basketball career ==
Grabau made his NBL debut in 1996 with the Geelong Supercats. He joined the inaugural Cairns Taipans team in 1999. He scored a career-high 28 points against the Townsville Crocodiles in January 2005 and in 2008 he finished runner-up for NBL Best Defensive Player. He retired in 2013 after 14 seasons with the team and 418 career NBL games. He finished as the Taipans' all-time leader in games played and second in club history in scoring. His number 8 jersey was retired late in his career while he was still playing and then again in 2019.

At state league level, Grabau played for the Mackay Meteors in 1997 and won the Queensland Basketball League (QBL) Youth Player of the Year. In 1998, he joined the Cairns Marlins and helped the team win the QBL championship and the ABA National championship. He went on to help the Marlins win QBL championships in 2001, 2004, 2007 and 2009, as well as ABA National championships in 2004 and 2007. He was named ABA grand final MVP in both 2004 and 2007. He was named QBL All-League Team in 2004, 2007, 2009 and 2012.

In 2020, Grabau was named the greatest QBL player of all time by The Courier-Mail.

== Personal life ==
As of 2016, Grabau works as a constable with the Queensland Police Service.
