= Shawn Myers =

Personal information
- Born: 26 May 1969 (age 57) Trinidad and Tobago
- Listed height: 6 ft 6 in (1.98 m)
- Listed weight: 216 lb (98 kg)

Career information
- College: St. Petersburg (1987–1989); West Georgia (1989–1991)
- NBA draft: 1991: undrafted
- Playing career: 1997–2013
- Position: Forward

Career history
- 1997–1998: Šilutė
- 1998–1999: Pyrbasket
- 1999–2001: Tindastóll
- 2001–2002: Newcastle Eagles
- 2002: Harbour Heat
- 2002: Hawke's Bay Hawks
- 2002: Chester Jets
- 2002–2003: Scottish Rocks
- 2003–2004: Newcastle Eagles
- 2004–2006: Chester Jets
- 2006–2008: Geelong Supercats
- 2006–2007: Leicester Riders
- 2007–2010: Cheshire Jets
- 2010–2011: Milton Keynes Lions
- 2011–2013: Cheshire Jets/Phoenix

Career highlights
- ABA champion (2006); 2× SEABL East champion (2006, 2007); BBL champion (2005); 3× BBL All-Star Team (2002, 2004, 2006); Icelandic Premier League Defensive Player of the Year (2000); 2× Icelandic All-Star (2000, 2001); 2× Icelandic All-Star Game MVP (2000); Icelandic Cup champion (2000); NKL All-Star (1998)

Shawn Myers (born 26 May 1969) is a Trinidadian-American-British former professional basketball player. After playing college basketball between 1987 and 1991, Myers had an extensive professional career playing in Europe while also having stints in Australia and New Zealand.

Between 1997 and 2001, Myers played in Lithuania, Finland and Iceland before moving to Britain where he began a long-term career in the British Basketball League (BBL). Between 2001 and 2013, he appeared in every BBL season for various teams including the Chester Jets and the Cheshire Jets. After beginning the 2013–14 season with the Cheshire Phoenix, he parted ways with the club by mutual consent on 31 October and subsequently retired from basketball at the age of 44.

In addition to his lucrative European career, Myers played nine games in the New Zealand National Basketball League in 2002 for the Harbour Heat (one game) and the Hawke's Bay Hawks (eight games), and spent three seasons with the Geelong Supercats of the SEABL between 2006 and 2008, playing in 73 games and winning a national title in 2006.
