= Anthony Stewart (basketball player) =

Australian basketball player

Personal information
- Born: 15 April 1970 (age 56) Burnie, Tasmania, Australia
- Listed height: 196 cm (6 ft 5 in)
- Listed weight: 92 kg (203 lb)

Career information
- Playing career: 1989–2013
- Position: Guard
- Coaching career: 2009–present

Career history

Playing
- 1989: Devonport
- 1990–1992: Launceston Ocelots
- 1992–1994: Hobart Devils
- 1995–2000: Perth Wildcats
- 2000–2007: Cairns Taipans
- 2005–2011: Hobart Chargers
- 2007: Townsville Crocodiles
- 2013: Hobart Chargers

Coaching
- 2009–2013: Hobart Chargers
- 2016–2018: Hobart Chargers
- 2019: Southern Huskies
- 2021–2024: Hobart Chargers

Career highlights
- As player: 2× NBL champion (1995, 2000); SEABL champion (2008); Australian Club Championships All-Star Five (2008); As coach: NBL1 South champion (2022); SEABL champion (2018)

Anthony Stewart (born 15 April 1970) is an Australian basketball coach and former player. He played 17 seasons in the National Basketball League (NBL) and won two NBL championships with the Perth Wildcats in 1995 and 2000. He also played eight seasons for the Hobart Chargers in the South East Australian Basketball League (SEABL). He served as head coach of the Chargers in 12 seasons over three stints between 2009 and 2024.

== Early life ==
Stewart was born in Burnie, Tasmania.

== Playing career ==
=== NBL ===
Stewart debuted in the National Basketball League (NBL) in 1992 with the Hobart Devils. He played for the Devils in 1992, 1993 and 1994, before joining the Perth Wildcats in 1995. He played six seasons for the Wildcats, winning NBL championships in 1995 and 2000.

Stewart joined the Cairns Taipans for the 2000–01 NBL season, where he played seven seasons and 223 games. He was released by the Taipans in March 2007. He served as the Taipans' captain in 2004–05, co-captain in 2005–06, and captain again in 2006–07.

Stewart joined the Townsville Crocodiles for the start of the 2007–08 NBL season, where he played four games between 26 September and 11 October as an injury replacement.

=== SEABL ===
Stewart debuted in the South East Australian Basketball League (SEABL) in 1989 for Devonport (later known as NW Tasmania). He played for the Launceston Ocelots in the SEABL in 1990, 1991 and 1992.

Between 2005 and 2011, Stewart played in the SEABL for the Hobart Chargers. He was named to the All SEABL South Conference All-Star team in 2007 and was team captain in 2008 when the Chargers won the SEABL championship. He served as player-coach in 2009, 2010 and 2011; sole coach in 2012; and then player-coach again in 2013. He left the Chargers following the 2013 season.

=== National team ===
Stewart played for the Australian Boomers in 2001.

== Coaching career ==
In November 2015, Stewart returned to the Hobart Chargers as head coach ahead of the 2016 SEABL season, signing on for three seasons. He guided the Chargers to the SEABL championship in 2018. He initially re-signed with the Chargers for another year but the team opted not to enter the 2019 NBL1 season following the demise of the SEABL.

In December 2018, Stewart joined the Southern Huskies as head coach for their inaugural season in the New Zealand NBL. The Huskies endured what was described as "shambolic" away trips across the Tasman during the 2019 New Zealand NBL season which strained relationships between staff and players, only some of whom were being paid on time. At one stage late in the season, players threatened mutiny due to non-payment. Stewart endured a period he described as "the worst six months of his life". The Huskies missed the post-season with a fifth-place finish and a 9–9 record and subsequently withdrew from the New Zealand NBL and folded.

Stewart was set to return to the Hobart Chargers for the 2020 NBL1 season but the team ultimately missed the entire year due to the COVID-19 pandemic. He made his return as Chargers head coach in the NBL1 South in the 2021 season, guiding the team to a third-place finish with an 11–4 record. He re-signed for the 2022 season and led the Chargers to the NBL1 South championship after they defeated the Mount Gambier Pioneers in the grand final. He re-signed for the 2023 season.

In November 2024, Stewart stepped down as head coach of the Chargers and moved into a director of coaching role at the club.
