= Cameron Tovey =

Australian basketball player (born 1985)

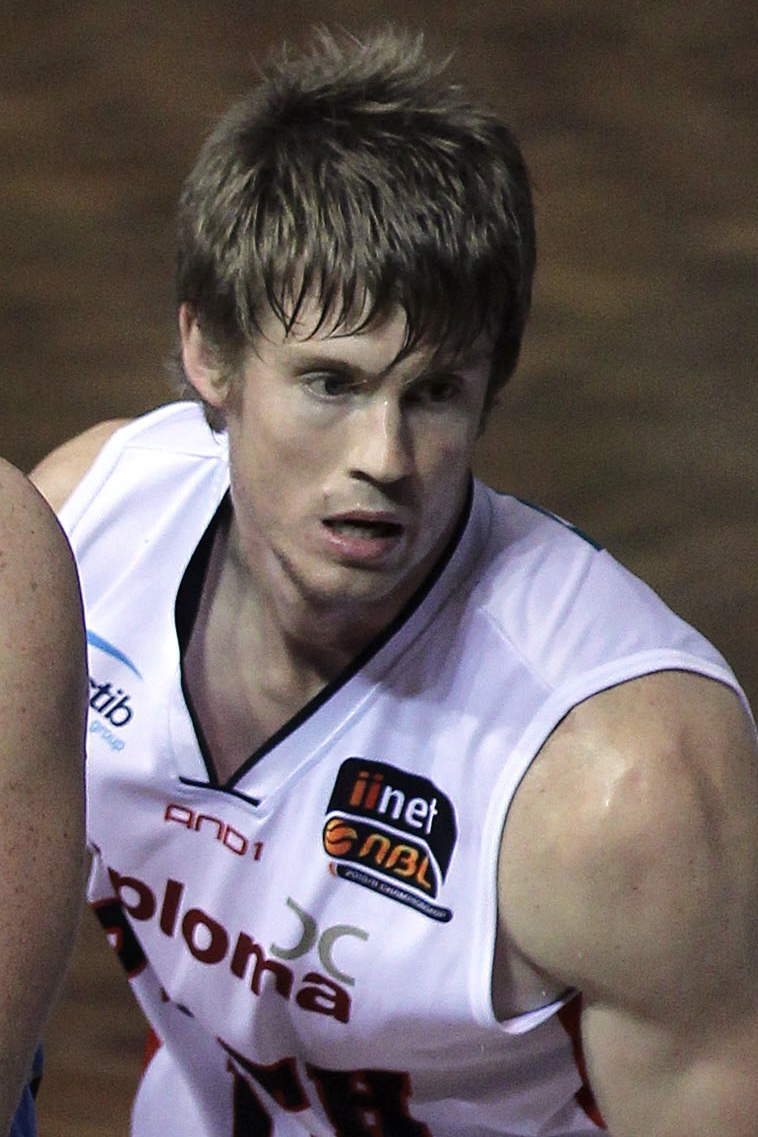
- Tovey with the Perth Wildcats in 2011

Personal information
- Born: 26 June 1985 (age 41) Penang, Malaysia
- Listed height: 202 cm (6 ft 8 in)
- Listed weight: 92 kg (203 lb)

Career information
- High school: Willetton Senior (Perth, Western Australia)
- College: Augusta (2004–2005)
- Playing career: 2003–2013
- Position: Small forward / shooting guard

Career history
- 2003–2006: Willetton Tigers
- 2005–2006: Perth Wildcats
- 2006–2007: Sutherland Sharks
- 2006–2008: Sydney Kings
- 2008: Kalamunda Eastern Suns
- 2008–2010: Townsville Crocodiles
- 2009: Townsville Heat
- 2010–2011: Willetton Tigers
- 2010–2013: Perth Wildcats

Career highlights
- SBL champion (2010); SBL Grand Final MVP (2010); SBL All-Star Five (2010); ABA Finals All-Star Five (2006); SBL Most Improved Player (2004); Peach Belt Freshman of the Year (2005)

Cameron Tovey (born 26 June 1985) is an Australian former professional basketball player. He played a season of college basketball in the United States for the Augusta Jaguars before playing eight seasons in the National Basketball League (NBL) between 2005 and 2013. He also played many years in the State Basketball League (SBL), winning an SBL championship in 2010 with the Willetton Tigers.

== Early life ==
Tovey was born in Penang, Malaysia. He grew up in Perth, Western Australia, and attended Willetton Senior High School, where he was a member of the silver-medal winning team at the 2002 Australian National High School Tournament. He played for the Willetton Tigers of the State Basketball League (SBL) in 2003 and 2004, winning the 2004 SBL Most Improved Player Award.

== College career ==
In 2004, Tovey moved to the United States to play college basketball for Augusta State University. In his one season, he was named the Peach Belt Conference (PBC) Freshman of the Year, becoming the fourth Jaguar to earn the Freshman of the Year award. Tovey was second on the team and 17th in the PBC in scoring with 11.6 points per game and was also ranked 10th in the PBC in assists with 3.2 per contest. He completed his freshman year having started all 30 games for the Jaguars, averaging 12.0 points, a team-high 7.4 rebounds, 3.2 assists and 1.5 steals per game. Following the 2004–05 season, Tovey left the program to begin his professional career in Australia.

== Professional career ==
In June 2005, Tovey signed with the Perth Wildcats of the National Basketball League (NBL). He was limited to 22 games in the 2005–06 season after sustaining a season-ending knee injury against the West Sydney Razorbacks on 10 December 2005. He averaged 4.5 points and 1.9 rebounds per game. He parted ways with the Wildcats in March 2006.

After playing for the Sutherland Sharks of the Waratah League, Tovey joined the Sydney Kings for the 2006–07 NBL season. In 32 games, he averaged 5.0 points and 2.2 rebounds per game. After another stint with the Sutherland Sharks in 2007, Tovey helped the Kings win the minor premiership and reach the NBL Grand Final series in 2007–08. In his second season with the Kings, he averaged 6.0 points, 2.8 rebounds and 1.1 assists in 37 games.

After playing for the Kalamunda Eastern Suns in the 2008 SBL season, Tovey joined the Townsville Crocodiles for the 2008–09 NBL season. He then played for the Townsville Heat in the Queensland Basketball League in 2009 and then returned to the Crocodiles for the 2009–10 NBL season.

After helping the Willetton Tigers win the 2010 SBL championship, Tovey joined the Perth Wildcats for the 2010–11 NBL season. He averaged 8.1 points, 5.0 rebounds and 2.6 assists per game in 2010–11.

After another stint with the Willetton Tigers in 2011, Tovey re-joined the Wildcats for the 2011–12 NBL season. He helped the Wildcats reach the NBL Grand Final series, where they lost 2–1 to the New Zealand Breakers.

With the Wildcats in 2012–13, Tovey helped them return to the NBL Grand Final series, where they lost 2–0 to the Breakers. He retired from the NBL following the season.

== National team ==
Tovey competed with the Australian University National Team at the 2009 Summer Universiade in Serbia.

== Personal life ==
In 2009, Tovey attended Curtin University. He became a professional accountant.

In September 2020, Tovey was elected chairman of Willetton Basketball Association (WBA). He had been finance director on the WBA Board for six years. He moved to the position of vice chair in 2023.
