= Stephen Weigh =

Australian basketball player (born 1987)

Personal information
- Born: 28 February 1987 (age 39) Mount Isa, Australia
- Listed height: 202 cm (6 ft 8 in)
- Listed weight: 102 kg (225 lb)

Career information
- High school: Lake Ginninderra (Canberra, ACT)
- College: Utah (2006–2008)
- NBA draft: 2009: undrafted
- Playing career: 2004–2018
- Position: Forward

Career history
- 2004: Rockhampton Rockets
- 2005–2006: Australian Institute of Sport
- 2008: Rockhampton Rockets
- 2008–2011: Perth Wildcats
- 2009–2010: East Perth Eagles
- 2011: Rockhampton Rockets
- 2011–2013: Adelaide 36ers
- 2013: Rockhampton Rockets
- 2013–2018: Cairns Taipans
- 2017: Cairns Marlins

Career highlights
- NBL champion (2010); 2× QBL champion (2008, 2013); Bob Staunton Medal (2005)

Stephen William Weigh (born 28 February 1987) is an Australian former professional basketball player who spent 10 seasons in the National Basketball League (NBL). He started his NBL career in 2008 after a two-year college stint at Utah. He won his only NBL Championship in 2010 with the Wildcats before joining the Adelaide 36ers in 2011. After two seasons with the 36ers, Weigh returned to his home state of Queensland and played out his final five seasons with the Cairns Taipans.

In addition to his NBL career, Weigh was a consistent presence in the Australian state leagues. He played four seasons with his hometown Rockhampton Rockets and won QBL Championships with them in 2008 and 2013.

== Junior and college career ==
Weigh attended the Australian Institute of Sport (AIS) from 2005 to 2006, where he played for the AIS men's team in the South East Australian Basketball League (SEABL). In 2005, he was named the MVP of both the Australian Under-20 National Tournament and the Adidas Asia Superstar Camp.

On 29 November 2005, Weigh signed a National Letter of Intent to play college basketball for the University of Utah. He went on to average 19 points and five rebounds per game in the 2006 SEABL season. Following the SEABL season, he moved to the United States where he joined the Utah Utes men's basketball team for the 2006–07 season. After a successful freshman season, Weigh was hit with injuries during his sophomore season and decided to return to Australia in January 2008. In 40 games over one and a half seasons for Utah, he averaged 4.8 points and 1.6 rebounds per game.

=== College statistics ===
Year	Team	GP	GS	MPG	FG%	3P%	FT%	RPG	APG	SPG	BPG	PPG
2006–07	Utah	29	11	17.9	.449	.400	.681	1.6	.8	.1	.0	5.0
2007–08	Utah	11	4	14.9	.370	.308	.545	1.4	.5	.4	.1	4.4

== Professional career ==
=== Perth Wildcats ===
On 28 April 2008, Weigh signed with the Brisbane Bullets for the 2008–09 NBL season. However, in June 2008, the Bullets were forced to release all its contracted players and later pulled out of the competition.

On 25 June 2008, Weigh signed a three-year deal with the Perth Wildcats. Weigh became a valuable member of a quality Wildcats team which included players such as Paul Rogers and Shawn Redhage. In just his second season in the NBL, Weigh was part of the Wildcats record fifth championship when they defeated the Wollongong Hawks two games to one in the 2010 Grand Final series.

In 2010–11, the Wildcats could not overcome late season injuries, including losing Redhage to a near-career ending hip injury, and only managed to finish fourth in defense of their title, losing a close fought semi-final series 2–1 to eventual champions, the New Zealand Breakers. Overall, Weigh played 94 games for the Wildcats and in his last season averaged 11.0 points and 5.4 rebounds per game.

=== Adelaide 36ers ===
On 23 May 2011, Weigh signed a two-year deal with the Adelaide 36ers.

During the 2012 All-Star festivals in Adelaide on 22 December 2012, Weigh, in addition to competing for the South All-Stars team, emerged victorious in the Three-Point Shootout, edging out Peter Crawford in the final.

=== Cairns Taipans ===
On 9 July 2013, Weigh signed a three-year deal with the Cairns Taipans. In 2013–14, he played 28 games while averaging 8.8 points, 3.7 rebounds and 1.1 assists per game.

On 21 October 2014, Weigh was named Player of the Week for Round 2 after scoring 15 points against Melbourne on 17 October and 14 points against Wollongong on 19 October.

In May 2015, Weigh declined to take up the third-year player option on his contract, thus making him a free agent. He later re-signed with the Taipans on 23 June 2015 to a three-year deal.

On 29 March 2017, Weigh signed with the Cairns Marlins for the 2017 Queensland Basketball League season. However, on 7 April 2017, Weigh was diagnosed with a minor pre-stress fracture in his foot, ruling him out for six weeks.

On 1 February 2018, Weigh announced his decision to retire at the end of the 2017–18 NBL season, after battling a foot injury all season.

== International career ==
In July 2005, Weigh led the AIS team in scoring at the 2005 William Jones Cup. He averaged 18 points and five rebounds per game. Against Team USA, he scored 26 points, and against Japan, he scored 32 points. The AIS was the only junior age level team in the tournament.

In June 2011, Weigh played for the Australian Boomers in the two-game YouYi Games series against China. On 15 July 2011, it was announced that Weigh had been added to the Boomers training squad competing for a spot on the team in the lead up to the 2012 Olympics in London.

== Personal ==
Weigh grew up in Rockhampton, Queensland and is the son of Ian and Cathie Weigh. His father runs Ian Weigh Toyota in Rockhampton, one of Australia’s most successful car dealerships. Weigh also has two brothers who both play basketball.
