= Aaron Fearne =

Australian basketball player and coach (born 1974)

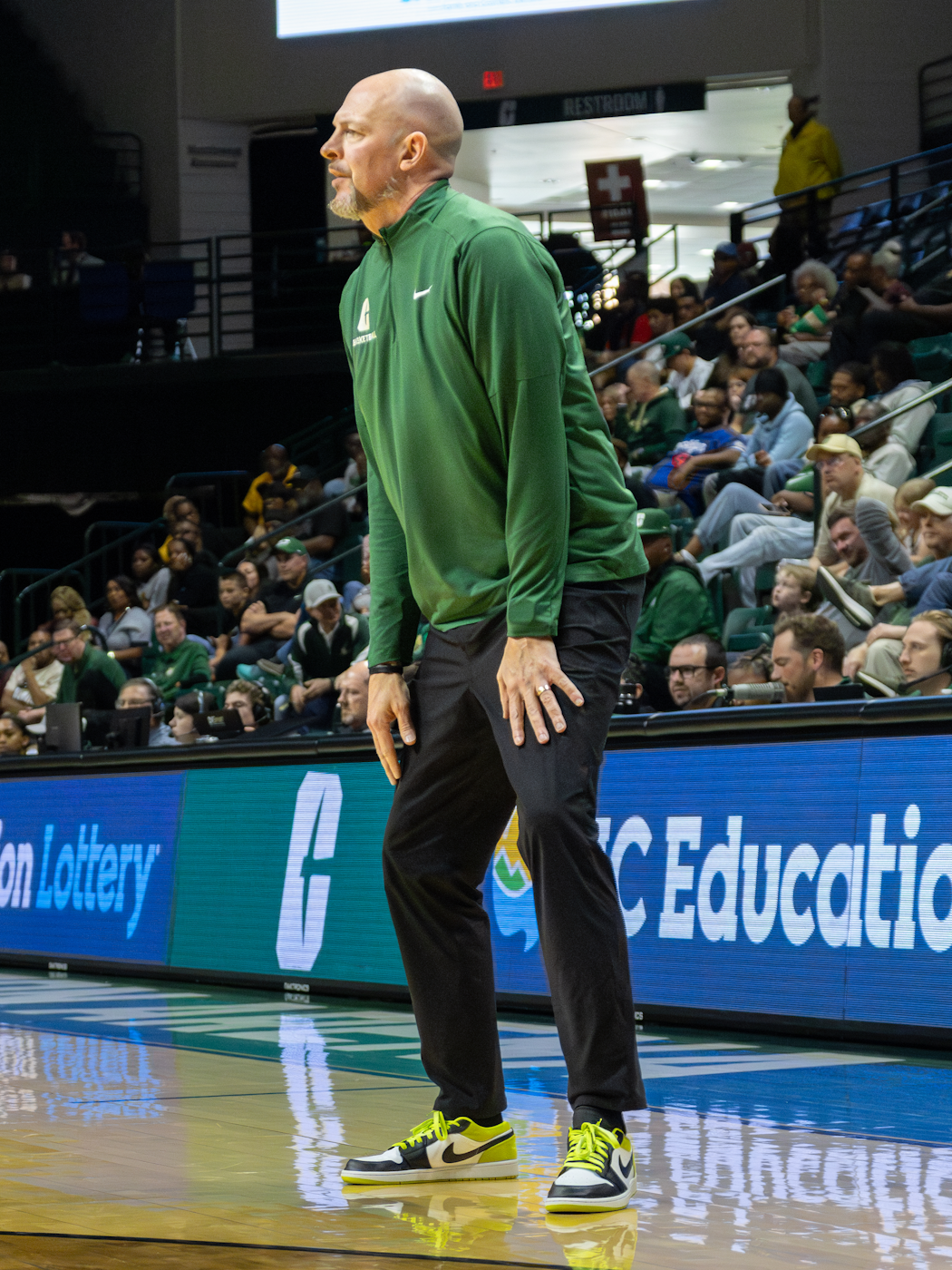
- Fearne with the Charlotte 49ers in 2025

Current position
- Title: Assistant Coach
- Team: Charleston
- Conference: CAA

Biographical details
- Born: May 30, 1974 (age 52); Sydney, New South Wales

Playing career
- 1993–1994: Western Technical
- 1994–1995: Mid-State Technical
- 1995–1997: Mayville State
- 1998–2005: Cairns Marlins
- 1999–2001: Cairns Taipans
- Position: Forward

Coaching career (HC unless noted)
- 2001–2009: Cairns Taipans (assistant)
- 2006–2009: Cairns Marlins
- 2009–2018: Cairns Taipans
- 2018–2023: Charlotte (assistant)
- 2023–2026: Charlotte
- 2026–present: Charleston (assistant)

Head coaching record
- Overall: 47–51 (.480)

Accomplishments and honors

Awards
- NBL Coach of the Year (2015); 2× QBL champion (2007, 2009); 2× QBL Coach of the Year (2006, 2007)

Aaron Craig Fearne (born May 30, 1974) is an Australian basketball coach and former professional player who is currently an assistant coach for the Charleston Cougars of the Coastal Athletic Association. He previously served as the head coach of the Charlotte 49ers of the American Conference and the Cairns Taipans of the Australian National Basketball League (NBL).

== Playing career ==
Fearne played college basketball in the United States. He played for Western Wisconsin Technical College during the 1993–94 season and Mid-State Technical College during the 1994–95 season. Fearne played his final two seasons at Mayville State University from 1995 to 1997. He served as a student coach for the team during the 1997–98 season.

Fearne played for the Cairns Marlins from 1998 to 2005. He played for the Cairns Taipans of the NBL as a forward from 1999 to 2001 where he averaged 3.0 points, 1.7 rebounds and 0.6 assists in 38 games.

== Coaching career ==
Fearne served as an assistant coach for the Taipans from 2001 to 2009. He was the head coach of the Marlins of the Queensland Basketball League (QBL) from 2006 to 2009. He led the team to QBL championships in 2007 and 2009. Fearne was named the QBL Coach of the Year in 2006 and 2007.

Fearne was head coach of the Taipans for nine seasons and led the team to three postseason berths. Fearne was named as the NBL Coach of the Year in 2015. On 3 March 2018, the Taipans announced that Fearne would not return as head coach.

=== Charlotte (2018–2026) ===
On August 1, 2018 Fearne joined the Charlotte 49ers as an assistant coach. When head coach Ron Sanchez left Charlotte in June 2023 to become the top assistant to Tony Bennett at Virginia, Fearne was named interim head coach, with his appointment for the entire 2023–24 season later becoming official.

On February 12, 2024, Charlotte removed the interim tag from Fearne, naming him the program’s permanent head coach after leading the 49ers to a 15-8 start and 9-2 mark in The American.

On March 17, 2026, Charlotte announced that it had parted ways with Fearne.

=== Charleston (2026–present) ===
In April 2026 Fearne became an assistant coach at Charleston.

== Head coaching record ==
Record table
Season	Team	Overall	Conference	Standing	Postseason
Charlotte 49ers (American Athletic Conference) (2023–2026)
2023–24	Charlotte	19–12	13–5	3rd	
2024–25	Charlotte	11–22	3–15	13th	
2025–26	Charlotte	17–17	9–9	T–5th	
Charlotte:		47–51 (.480)	25–29 (.463)		
Total:		47–51 (.480)			
National champion Postseason invitational champion Conference regular season champion Conference regular season and conference tournament champion Division regular season champion Division regular season and conference tournament champion Conference tournament champion

== Personal life ==
Fearne was born in Sydney, New South Wales. He is married and has two children.
