= Cairns Taipans =

National Basketball League team in Cairns, Australia

- 2026–27 Cairns Taipans season
- League: NBL
- Founded: 1999; 27 years ago
- History: Cairns Taipans; 1999–present
- Arena: Cairns Convention Centre
- Capacity: 5,300
- Location: Cairns, Queensland
- Team colors: Orange, navy, white
- Main sponsor: Kenfrost Homes
- CEO: Mark Beecroft
- President: Troy Stone
- Head coach: Adam Forde
- Team captain: Shaun Bruce
- Ownership: Taipans Basketball Incorporated
- Affiliation: Cairns Marlins
- Championships: 0
- Retired numbers: 1 (8)
- Website: Taipans.com
Home	Away

The Cairns Taipans are an Australian professional basketball team based in Cairns, Queensland. The Taipans compete in the National Basketball League (NBL) and play their home games at the Cairns Convention Centre, known colloquially as "The Snakepit".

== History ==
=== Early years (1999–2008) ===
The Taipans were founded in 1999, entering the National Basketball League (NBL) for the 1999–2000 NBL season. Led by head coach Rod Popp, the Taipans' debut season ended with a 2–26 record. The Taipans failed to qualify for the post-season in their first four seasons. In the 2003–04 NBL season, the Taipans defeated the Perth Wildcats 103–96 in an elimination final at the Cairns Convention Centre. In winning their first final, the Taipans moved on to the quarter-finals, where they were defeated 110–88 by the West Sydney Razorbacks. After missing the finals in 2004–05, the Taipans made three straight finals appearances between 2005–06 and 2007–08.

=== Financial difficulties (2008–2009) ===
In December 2008, the Taipans were placed into voluntary administration. As a result, coach Alan Black was sacked and imports Larry Abney and Dave Thomas were let go. The rest of the team had to agree to a blanket 45 per cent pay cut for the rest of the season. Less than 12 months later, the Taipans were again in financial trouble – at the time, the club was almost $350,000 over budget and had only recorded a profit in one of the previous four months. In response, Basketball Australia and Cairns Regional Council vowed to continue supporting the cash-strapped Taipans.

=== NBL Grand Finalists (2011; 2015) ===
Cairns Taipans former logo (1999-2012)

The 2010–11 NBL season saw the Taipans reach their first NBL Grand Final series behind star trio Ron Dorsey, Ayinde Ubaka and Daniel Dillon. They faced the New Zealand Breakers and lost game one 85–67. In game two, they tied the series with an 85–81 double-overtime win. It marked the first time in NBL history a play-off match was decided in double overtime. After Breakers guard C. J. Bruton hit a three-pointer in the dying seconds of regulation to send the match into overtime, Dorsey responded with a three-pointer at the buzzer at the end of the first overtime to force the match into double overtime. With momentum on their side, the Taipans were able to finish out the match on top. The Breakers went on to win 71–53 in game three after import pair Ubaka and Dorsey shot 4-of-26 between them, as the Taipans finished the season as runners-up. Following the season, Dorsey, Ubaka and Dillon all left Cairns to join the Melbourne Tigers, each departing the Taipans after just one season.

The 2014–15 NBL season saw the Taipans clinch their first ever NBL minor premiership. They finished the regular season in first place with a 21–7 record, becoming the first regional team to finish on top of the ladder since the Geelong Supercats in 1984. The Taipans also made history by using the same starting five of Scottie Wilbekin (Point guard), Cameron Gliddon (Shooting guard), Stephen Weigh (Small forward), Alex Loughton (Power forward) and Matt Burston (Centre) all season. They went on to reach their second NBL Grand Final series, where they once again faced the New Zealand Breakers. Despite having home court advantage, the Taipans were defeated 86–71 in game one and 83–81 in game two. Breakers forward Ekene Ibekwe hit a game-winning fade-away shot in game two to clinch the series.

== Honour roll ==
NBL championships:	0
Regular-season champions:	1 (2015)
NBL finals appearances:	9 (2004, 2006, 2007, 2008, 2011, 2015, 2017, 2020, 2023)
NBL Grand Final appearances:	2 (2011, 2015)
All-NBL First Team:	Chris Burgess (2005), Martin Cattalini (2007), Scottie Wilbekin (2015), Scott Machado (2020)
All-NBL Second Team:	Nathan Jawai (2008), Jamar Wilson (2012), Melo Trimble (2019), D. J. Newbill (2020), Cameron Oliver (2020), D. J. Hogg (2023), Keanu Pinder (2023)
All-NBL Third Team:	Ben Knight (2001), Chris Burgess (2006), Martin Cattalini (2006), Darnell Mee (2006), Alex Loughton (2011), Ayinde Ubaka (2011), Jamar Wilson (2013)
NBL Rookie of the Year:	Nathan Jawai (2008), Cameron Gliddon (2013), Bul Kuol (2022)
NBL Most Improved Player:	Gary Boodnikoff (2006), Keanu Pinder (2022, 2023)
NBL Coach of the Year:	Aaron Fearne (2015), Mike Kelly (2020), Adam Forde (2023)
NBL Best Sixth Man:	Cameron Tragardh (2015)
NBL Best Defensive Player:	Darnell Mee (2006), D. J. Newbill (2020)
NBL Next Generation Award:	Sam Waardenburg (2023)

== Season by season ==
NBL champions	League champions	Runners-up	Finals berth

Season	Tier	League	Regular season					Post-season	Head coach	Captain	Club MVP
Season	Tier	League	Finish	Played	Wins	Losses	Win %	Post-season	Head coach	Captain	Club MVP
Cairns Taipans
1999–2000	1	NBL	11th	28	2	26	.071	Did not qualify	Rod Popp	Terry Johnson	not awarded
2000–01	1	NBL	9th	28	6	22	.214	Did not qualify	Rod Popp	Anthony Stewart	Ben Knight; Aaron Trahair
2001–02	1	NBL	11th	30	9	21	.300	Did not qualify	Guy Molloy	Anthony Stewart	Jayson Wells
2002–03	1	NBL	8th	30	13	17	.433	Did not qualify	Guy Molloy	Brad Davidson; Jayson Wells	Ben Knight; Anthony Stewart
2003–04	1	NBL	6th	33	16	17	.485	Won elimination final (Perth) 103–96; Lost quarterfinal (West Sydney) 88–110	Guy Molloy	Brad Davidson	Marcus Timmons
2004–05	1	NBL	10th	32	11	21	.344	Did not qualify	Guy Molloy	Anthony Stewart	Chris Burgess
2005–06	1	NBL	5th	32	18	14	.563	Won elimination final (Hunter) 88–80; Won quarterfinal (Adelaide) 106–103; Lost semifinals (Sydney) 0–2	Alan Black	Anthony Stewart; Darnell Mee	Martin Cattalini
2006–07	1	NBL	6th	33	17	16	.515	Won elimination final (South) 118–97; Won quarterfinal (Perth) 82–78; Lost semifinals (Melbourne) 0–2	Alan Black	Anthony Stewart	Martin Cattalini
2007–08	1	NBL	6th	30	16	14	.533	Lost elimination final (New Zealand) 78–100	Alan Black	Martin Cattalini	Nathan Jawai
2008–09	1	NBL	9th	30	11	19	.367	Did not qualify	Alan Black; Mark Beecroft	Martin Cattalini	Martin Cattalini
2009–10	1	NBL	7th	28	11	17	.393	Did not qualify	Aaron Fearne	Phill Jones	Dusty Rychart
2010–11	1	NBL	3rd	28	16	12	.571	Won semifinals (Townsville) 2–1; Lost NBL finals (New Zealand) 1–2	Aaron Fearne	Phill Jones; Alex Loughton; Ian Crosswhite	Ayinde Ubaka
2011–12	1	NBL	5th	28	15	13	.536	Did not qualify	Aaron Fearne	Alex Loughton; Ian Crosswhite	Jamar Wilson
2012–13	1	NBL	6th	28	11	17	.393	Did not qualify	Aaron Fearne	Alex Loughton	Jamar Wilson
2013–14	1	NBL	6th	28	12	16	.429	Did not qualify	Aaron Fearne	Cameron Tragardh	Cameron Gliddon
2014–15	1	NBL	1st	28	21	7	.750	Won semifinals (Perth) 2–0; Lost NBL finals (New Zealand) 0–2	Aaron Fearne	Cameron Gliddon	Scottie Wilbekin
2015–16	1	NBL	6th	28	12	16	.429	Did not qualify	Aaron Fearne	Cameron Gliddon	Cameron Gliddon
2016–17	1	NBL	2nd	28	15	13	.536	Lost semifinals (Perth) 0–2	Aaron Fearne	Cameron Gliddon	Travis Trice
2017–18	1	NBL	6th	28	11	17	.393	Did not qualify	Aaron Fearne	Cameron Gliddon	Cameron Gliddon; Mitch McCarron
2018–19	1	NBL	8th	28	6	22	.214	Did not qualify	Mike Kelly	Alex Loughton	Melo Trimble
2019–20	1	NBL	3rd	28	16	12	.571	Lost semifinals (Perth) 1–2	Mike Kelly	Nathan Jawai; D. J. Newbill	Scott Machado
2020–21	1	NBL	9th	36	8	28	.222	Did not qualify	Mike Kelly	Scott Machado	Scott Machado
2021–22	1	NBL	9th	28	9	19	.321	Did not qualify	Adam Forde	Scott Machado	Tahjere McCall
2022–23	1	NBL	3rd	28	18	10	.643	Lost seeding qualifier (Tasmania) 79–87; Won play-in game (Perth) 91–78; Lost semifinals (Sydney) 1–2	Adam Forde	Tahjere McCall	D. J. Hogg
2023–24	1	NBL	8th	28	12	16	.429	Did not qualify	Adam Forde	Tahjere McCall	Patrick Miller
2024–25	1	NBL	10th	29	8	21	.276	Did not qualify	Adam Forde	Taran Armstrong	Sam Waardenburg
2025–26	1	NBL	9th	33	9	24	.273	Did not qualify	Adam Forde	Sam Waardenburg	Jack McVeigh
Regular season record				796	329	467	.413	1 regular season champions			
Finals record				31	13	18	.419	0 NBL championships			

As of the end of the 2025–26 season

=== Summary ===
Years	Chairman	CEO	Head coach	Championships	Finals appearances
1999-2001	Jeff Hopgood	?	Rod Popp		
2001-2004	Jeff Hopgood	Brad Tassell	Guy Molloy		2004
2004-2005	Jeff Hopgood	Juanita O'Brien	Guy Molloy		
2005-2006	John O'Brien	Juanita O'Brien	Alan Black		2006
2006-2008	John O'Brien	Denis Keeffe	Alan Black		2007, 2008
2008-2009	Denis Keeffe	Alan Black	Mark Beecroft		
2009-2011	Denis Donaghy	Mark Beecroft	Aaron Fearne		2011
2011-2014	Adrian Garrone	Mark Beecroft	Aaron Fearne		
2014-2018	Troy Stone	Mark Beecroft	Aaron Fearne		2015, 2017
2018–2021	Troy Stone	Mark Beecroft	Mike Kelly		2020
2021–2025	Troy Stone	Mark Beecroft	Adam Forde		2023

== Current roster ==
Note: Flags indicate national team eligibility at FIBA-sanctioned events. Players may hold other non-FIBA nationalities not displayed.

Cairns Taipans roster
Players
Coaches

Pos.	No.	Nat.	Name	Ht.	Wt.
G	1	(Australia)	McVeigh, Lloyd (DP)	1.98 m (6 ft 6 in)	92 kg (203 lb)
G	2	(Australia)	Smith, Reyne	1.88 m (6 ft 2 in)	86 kg (190 lb)
G	3	(United States)	Brown, Jaylon (I)	1.83 m (6 ft 0 in)	84 kg (185 lb)
G	5	(Australia)	Nunn, Brody (DP)	1.85 m (6 ft 1 in)	77 kg (170 lb)
F	6	(Australia)	Galloway, Jaylin (injured)	1.97 m (6 ft 6 in)	92 kg (203 lb)
G	7	(Australia)	Bruce, Shaun (C)	1.92 m (6 ft 4 in)	87 kg (192 lb)
F	9	(Australia)	McVeigh, Jack	2.03 m (6 ft 8 in)	93 kg (205 lb)
G	10	(Australia)	Paul, Luke (NS)	1.98 m (6 ft 6 in)
F	14	(Australia)	Galloway, Kyrin	2.03 m (6 ft 8 in)	98 kg (216 lb)
F/C	19	(Australia)	Yates, Luca (DP)	2.08 m (6 ft 10 in)	102 kg (225 lb)
F	22	(New Zealand)	Brown, Walter (injured)	1.94 m (6 ft 4 in)	89 kg (196 lb)
F	25	(Australia)	Pinder, Keanu	2.10 m (6 ft 11 in)	103 kg (227 lb)
F	33	(Trinidad and Tobago)	Lewis, Malique (I)	2.02 m (6 ft 8 in)	99 kg (218 lb)
F	43	(Australia)	Bolden, Jonah	2.03 m (6 ft 8 in)	106 kg (234 lb)
G	44	(South Sudan)	Dech, Sunday (injured)	1.95 m (6 ft 5 in)	92 kg (203 lb)

Head coach

- (Australia) Adam Forde

Assistant coach(es)

- (Australia) Angus Henskens
- (Australia) Will Lopez
- (Australia) Sinisa Markovic

Legend

- (C) Team captain
- (DP) Development player
- (IN) Inactive
- (I) Import player
- (IRP) Injury replacement player
- (NRP) Nominated replacement player
- Injured

- Roster
Updated: 4 November 2026

=== Retired jerseys ===
Cairns Taipans retired numbers
No.	Nat.	Player	Position	Tenure
8	(Australia)	Aaron Grabau	SG	1999–2013

== Notable past players ==
Note: Flags indicate national team eligibility at FIBA-sanctioned events. Players may hold other non-FIBA nationalities not displayed.

Criteria

To appear in this section a player must have either:

- Set a club record or won an individual award while at the club
- Played at least one official international match for their national team at any time
- Played at least one official NBA match at any time.

- (Australia) Kyle Adnam
- (Australia) Taran Armstrong
- (United States) Pedro Bradshaw
- (Australia) Shaun Bruce
- (Australia) Matt Burston
- (Australia) Martin Cattalini
- (United States) Torrey Craig
- (South Sudan) / (Australia) Majok Deng
- (United States) Rob Edwards
- (Australia) Anthony Fisher
- (Australia) Cameron Gliddon
- (Australia) Aaron Grabau
- (United States) Devon Hall
- (Australia) Nathan Jawai
- (New Zealand) Phill Jones
- (New Zealand) Jarrod Kenny
- (Sweden) Bobi Klintman
- (New Zealand) / (United States) Mojave King
- (South Sudan) / (Australia) Bul Kuol
- (New Zealand) Robert Loe
- (Australia) Alex Loughton
- (Brazil) / (United States) Scott Machado
- (South Sudan) / (Australia) Lat Mayen
- (Australia) Jack McVeigh
- (Australia) Darnell Mee
- (New Zealand) Sam Mennenga
- (Australia) Mitchell McCarron
- (Australia) James Mitchell
- (United States) Tony Mitchell
- (United States) / (Australia) Andre Moore
- (United States) Cameron Oliver
- (United States) Kenny Payne
- (Australia) Keanu Pinder
- (New Zealand) Tony Rampton
- (United States) / (Australia) Robert Rose
- (Australia) Dusty Rychart
- (United States) Admiral Schofield
- (Australia) Reyne Smith
- (Australia) Nathan Sobey
- (Australia) Clint Steindl
- (Australia) Anthony Stewart
- (Australia) Kody Stattmann
- (New Zealand) Lindsay Tait
- (Australia) Marcus Timmons
- (Australia) Cameron Tragardh
- (Australia) Aaron Trahair
- (United States) Travis Trice
- (United States) Melo Trimble
- (United States) Ayinde Ubaka
- (New Zealand) Sam Waardenburg
- (New Zealand) Jarrad Weeks
- (Australia) Stephen Weigh
- (Australia) Jayson Wells
- (Australia) Scottie Wilbekin
- (United States) Jamar Wilson
- (Australia) Mark Worthington
- (Australia) Mitchell Young
